= 2015–16 USM El Harrach season =

USM El Harrach
2015–16 season
- Chairman: Mohamed Laib
- Head coach: Boualem Charef
- Stadium: Stade 1er Novembre 1954
- Ligue 1: 9th
- Algerian Cup: Round of 16
- Top goalscorer: League: Hadj Bouguèche (7); All: Hadj Bouguèche (8)

In the 2015–16 season, USM El Harrach is competing in the Ligue 1 for the 32nd season, as well as the Algerian Cup. They will be competing in Ligue 1, and the Algerian Cup.

== Players ==
As of March 28, 2016:

Note: Flags indicate national team as defined under FIFA eligibility rules; some limited exceptions apply. Players may hold more than one non-FIFA nationality.

No.	Pos.	Nation	Player
1	GK	ALG	Farid Chaâl (on loan from MC Alger)
3	FW	ALG	Hadj Bouguèche
5	DF	ALG	Abderrahim Salem Dekhinet
6	MF	ALG	Hamza Aït Ouamar
7	MF	ALG	Billel Benaldjia
8	MF	ALG	Messaoud Gharbei
9	FW	ALG	Mehdi Meziane
10	MF	GUI	Mohamed Coumbassa
11	FW	ALG	Sofiane Younes
14	FW	ALG	Sofiane Benachour

No.	Pos.	Nation	Player
15	DF	ALG	Hadj Cheikh Boucherit
16	GK	ALG	Moustapha Zeghba
17	MF	ALG	Nasreddine Ourahmane
19	MF	ALG	Fares Brahimi
20	MF	ALG	Farid Boughida
21	DF	ALG	Zine El Abidine Boulekhoua
22	FW	ALG	Hichem Khalfallah
24	DF	ALG	Badis Lebbihi
25	MF	ALG	Abdenour Hattabi
27	FW	ALG	Yasser Gadi
28	DF	ALG	Chamseddine Harrag
29	DF	ALG	Ahmed Boumedienne

== Pre-season ==
15 July 2015 Friendly	USM Blida	2-3	USM El Harrach	USM El Harrach
23:30	Fekih 8'; Bedrane 23'			Stadium: Stade 1er Novembre 1954

== Competitions ==
=== Overview ===
Competition	Record								Started round	Final position / round	First match	Last match
Competition	G	W	D	L	GF	GA	GD	Win %	Started round	Final position / round	First match	Last match
Ligue 1	30	10	11	9	28	27	+1	33.33	—N/a	9th	14 August 2015	27 May 2015
Algerian Cup	3	0	2	1	3	1	+2	0.00	Round of 64	Round of 16	19 December 2015	19 February 2016
Total	33	10	13	10	31	28	+3	30.30				

== League table ==
Pos	Team	Pld	W	D	L	GF	GA	GD	Pts	Qualification or relegation
7	DRB Tadjenanet	30	11	10	9	32	30	+2	43	
8	CS Constantine	30	11	9	10	26	32	−6	42	
9	USM El Harrach	30	10	11	9	28	27	+1	41	
10	MC Oran	30	9	13	8	40	35	+5	40 (Note: MC Oran ahead of NA Hussein Dey on head-to-head record: MCO–NAH 1–0, NAH–MCO 1–0.)	
11	NA Hussein Dey	30	10	10	10	31	35	−4	40	Qualification for the Arab Club Championship group stage

Updated to match(es) played on 27 May 2016. Source: DZFoot
Rules for classification: 1) points; 2) head-to-head points; 3) head-to-head goal difference; 4) goal difference; 5) total goals; 6) fairplay ranking; 7) playoff.

=== Results summary ===
Overall								Home						Away					
Pld	W	D	L	GF	GA	GD	Pts	W	D	L	GF	GA	GD	W	D	L	GF	GA	GD
30	10	11	9	28	27	+1	41	8	5	2	20	8	+12	2	6	7	8	19	−11

Last updated: 31 January 2015.
Source: Competitive matches

=== Results by round ===
Round	1	2	3	4	5	6	7	8	9	10	11	12	13	14	15	16	17	18	19	20	21	22	23	24	25	26	27	28	29	30
Ground	A	H	A	H	A	H	A	H	A	H	A	H	A	H	A	H	A	H	A	H	A	H	A	H	A	H	A	H	A	H
Result	D	W	W	W	D	L	L	W	L	D	W	W	L	D	D	D	W	L	L	D	D	W	L	L	L	W	D	W	D	D
Position	8	4	2	1	2	5	5	4	5	5	4	3	4	4	5	6	5	5	7	7	7	6	6	9	11	9	9	8	8	9

Updated to match(es) played on 31 January 2015. Source: Competitive matches
A = Away; H = Home; W = Win; D = Draw; L = Loss

=== Matches ===
Win Draw Loss

14 August 2015 Round 1	USM El Harrach	1–1	JS Saoura	Belouizdad
17:00	Khalfallah 40'	Report; Live TV: None	74' Djallit	Stadium: Stade 20 Août 1955; Referee: Aouina, Aouina, Benaissa

22 August 2015 Round 2	USM Blida	0–1	USM El Harrach	Blida
18:00		Report; Live TV: None	10' Meziane	Stadium: Stade Mustapha Tchaker; Attendance: 0 (close doors); Referee: Benbraham, Allaoua, Yahi

28 August 2015 Round 3	USM El Harrach	1–0	ASM Oran	El Harrach
17:00	Younès 82'	Report; Live TV: None		Stadium: Stade 1er Novembre 1954; Referee: Zouaoui, Chita, Hamdi

10 September 2015 Round 4	USM El Harrach	2–0	NA Hussein Dey	Algiers
18:00	Meziane 43'; Harrag 90' (pen.)	Report; Live TV: Algérie 3 / Canal Algérie		Stadium: Stade 5 Juillet 1962; Referee: Boukouassa, Brahimi, Rachedi

19 September 2015 Round 5	DRB Tadjenanet	0–0	USM El Harrach	Tadjenanet
16:30		Report; Live TV: None		Stadium: Lahoua Smaïl Stadium; Referee: Ghorbal, Serradj, Cherchar

28 September 2015 Round 6	USM El Harrach	0–1	MC Alger	Algiers
18:00		Report; Live TV: TV Tamazight 4 / beIN Sports / Algérie 3	9' Aouedj	Stadium: Stade 5 Juillet 1962; Referee: Abid Charef, Gourari, Etchaiali

2 October 2015 Round 7	CS Constantine	2–0	USM El Harrach	Constantine
18:00	Djellilahine 36'; Boulemdaïs 63'	Report; Live TV: None		Stadium: Stade Mohamed Hamlaoui; Referee: Benbraham, Alaoua, Yahi

16 October 2015 Round 8	USM El Harrach	3–1	RC Arbaâ	El Harrach
16:00	Bouguèche 40'; Aït Ouamar 43' (pen.); Harrag 77' (pen.)	Report; Live TV: None	69' Guessan	Stadium: Stade 1er Novembre 1954; Referee: Mial, Salaouadji, Idir

24 October 2015 Round 9	JS Kabylie	4–2	USM El Harrach	Tizi Ouzou
16:00	Raiah 47'; Boulaouidet 49', 80'; Diawara 58'	Report; Live TV: None	39', 88' Bouguèche	Stadium: Stade 1er Novembre 1954; Referee: Arab, Biod, Boulfelfel

30 October 2015 Round 10	USM El Harrach	1–1	MC Oran	El Harrach
15:00	Bouguèche 13'	Report; Live TV: None	35' Za'abia	Stadium: Stade 1er Novembre 1954; Referee: Aouina, Benaïssa, Chnaoua

6 November 2015 Round 11	ES Sétif	0–1	USM El Harrach	Sétif
18:00		Report	80' Bouguèche	Stadium: Stade 8 Mai 1945; Referee: Benouza, Omari, Ayad

19 November 2015 Round 12	USM El Harrach	2–0	MO Béjaïa	El Harrach
15:00	Younes 53'; Aït Ouamar 85'	Report; Live TV: None		Stadium: Stade 1er Novembre 1954; Referee: Boukhalfa, Zerhouni, Etchiali

28 November 2015 Round 13	USM Alger	2–1	USM El Harrach	Algiers
16:00	Seguer 13', 42'	Report; Live TV: beIN Sports / Canal Algérie / Al Kass Sports	45+3' Younes	Stadium: Stade 5 Juillet 1962; Referee: Houasnia, Tazghout, Boulagrinet

11 December 2015 Round 14	USM El Harrach	1–1	CR Belouizdad	Algiers
16:00	Younes 45+2'	Report; Live TV: TV Tamazight 4 / beIN Sports	33' Feham	Stadium: Stade 5 Juillet 1962; Referee: Bekouassa, Bounoua, Rachedi

25 December 2015 Round 15	RC Relizane	1–1	USM El Harrach	Relizane
15:00	Tiaïba 22'	Report; Live TV: None	4' Khalfallah	Stadium: Stade Tahar Zoughari; Referee: Brahimi, Chaballah, Idir

15 January 2016 Round 16	JS Saoura	0–0	USM El Harrach	Béchar
18:00		Report; Live TV: None		Stadium: Stade 20 Août 1955; Referee: Saïdi, Abid, Miraoui

23 January 2016 Round 17	USM El Harrach	2–0	USM Blida	El Harrach
15:00	Bouguèche 10' (pen.); Meziane 35'	Report; Live TV: None		Stadium: Stade 1er Novembre 1954; Referee: Benouza, Gourari, Ayad

29 January 2016 Round 18	ASM Oran	1–0	USM El Harrach	Oran
15:00	Djemaouni 2'	Report; Live TV: Canal Algérie		Stadium: Stade Habib Bouakeul; Referee: Benbrahem, Allaoua, Bourouba

6 February 2016 Round 19	NA Hussein Dey	3–0	USM El Harrach	Algiers
16:00	Gasmi 10' (pen.); Ouhadda 22'; Choubani 46'	Report; Live TV: TV Tamazight 4 / Algérie 3		Stadium: Stade 5 Juillet 1962; Referee: Necib, Seradj, Meghloute

13 February 2016 Round 20	USM El Harrach	1–1	DRB Tadjenanet	El Harrach
16:00	Boughidah 21'	Report; Live TV: None	7' Chibane	Stadium: Stade 1er Novembre 1954; Referee: Boudrar, Badji, Messaoudi

26 February 2016 Round 21	MC Alger	0–0	USM El Harrach	Algiers
16:00		Report; Live TV: None		Stadium: Stade 5 Juillet 1962; Attendance: 0 (close doors); Referee: Ghorbal, Etchiali, Hadj Said

5 March 2016 Round 22	USM El Harrach	1–0	CS Constantine	El Harrach
16:00	Younes 22'	Report; Live TV: None		Stadium: Stade 1er Novembre 1954; Referee: Arab, Biod, Maghlout

19 March 2016 Round 23	RC Arbaâ	3–1	USM El Harrach	Larbaâ
16:00	Bouteldja 47'; Mahsas 54'; Meziane 90'	Report; Live TV: None	66' Coumbassa	Stadium: Stade Ismaïl Makhlouf; Referee: Bouzerar, Chablah, Lasoui

2 April 2016 Round 24	USM El Harrach	0–1	JS Kabylie	El Harrach
16:00		Report; Live TV: None	37' (pen.) Rial	Stadium: Stade 1er Novembre 1954; Referee: Necib, Maghlout, Benacer

15 April 2016 Round 25	MC Oran	2–0	USM El Harrach	Oran
18:00	Dahar 77'; Larbi 80'	Report; Live TV: TV Tamazight 4		Stadium: Stade Ahmed Zabana; Referee: Mial, Idir, Semsoum

23 April 2016 Round 26	USM El Harrach	1–0	ES Sétif	El Harrach
16:00	Aït Ouamar 52'	Report; Live TV: None		Stadium: Stade 1er Novembre 1954; Attendance: 0 (close doors); Referee: Boukhalfa, Zerhouni, Benali

30 April 2016 Round 27	MO Béjaïa	0–0	USM El Harrach	Béjaïa
16:00		Report; Live TV: None		Stadium: Stade de l'Unité Maghrébine; Referee: Abid Charef, Boulfelfel, Isaad

13 May 2016 Round 28	USM El Harrach	3–0	USM Alger	Algiers
17:30	Bouguèche 14'; Younes 85'; Mellal 90+3'	Report; Live TV: None		Stadium: Stade 5 Juillet 1962; Referee: Helalechi, Azerine, Doulache

20 May 2016 Round 29	CR Belouizdad	1–1	USM El Harrach	Algiers
17:30	Derrag 8'	Report; Live TV: None	70' Gharbi	Stadium: Stade 5 Juillet 1962; Referee: Bouzerar, Yahi, Lakni

27 May 2016 Round 30	USM El Harrach	1–1	RC Relizane	El Harrach
17:30	Boucherit 12'	Report; Live TV: None	1' Manucho	Stadium: Stade 1er Novembre 1954; Referee: Abid Charef, Boulfelfel, Saadi

== Algerian Cup ==
19 December 2015 Round of 64	USM El Harrach	1–1 (a.e.t.) (4–2 p)	IRB Maghnia	El Harrach
14:15	Younes 52'		Hebiri 55'	Stadium: Stade 1er Novembre 1954; Referee: Gamouh, Benchaâbia et Benhacen

8 January 2016 Round of 32	USM El Harrach	2–0	IRB El Kerma	El Harrach
14:45	Meziane 32'; Bouguèche 79'			Stadium: Stade 1er Novembre 1954; Referee: Bahloul, Amri, Benhamouda

19 February 2016 Round of 16	US Tébessa	1–0	USM El Harrach	Tébessa
15:00	Daoudi 20' (pen.)			Stadium: Stade du 4 Mars; Referee: Achouri, Benhamouda, Amri

== Squad information ==
=== Playing statistics ===
No.	Pos	Nat	Player	Total		Ligue 1		Algerian Cup	
No.	Pos	Nat	Player	Apps	Goals	Apps	Goals	Apps	Goals
Goalkeepers
16	GK	(Algeria) ALG	Moustapha Zeghba	6	0	5	0	1	0
1	GK	(Algeria) ALG	Farid Chaâl	27	0	25	0	2	0
Defenders
24	DF	(Algeria) ALG	Badis Lebbihi	31	0	29	0	2	0
5	DF	(Algeria) ALG	Abderrahim Salem Dekhinet	10	0	9	0	1	0
15	DF	(Algeria) ALG	Hadj Cheikh Boucherit	28	1	25	1	3	0
	DF	(Algeria) ALG	Hocine Chennoufi	3	0	3	0	0	0
7	DF	(Algeria) ALG	Mohamed Billel Benaldjia	21	0	19	0	2	0
21	DF	(Algeria) ALG	Zine el Abidine Boulakhoua	23	0	21	0	2	0
29	DF	(Algeria) ALG	Ahmed Boumediene	1	0	1	0	0	0
Midfielders
8	MF	(Algeria) ALG	Messaoud Gherbi	25	1	23	1	2	0
6	MF	(Algeria) ALG	Hamza Aït Ouamar	29	3	26	3	3	0
28	MF	(Algeria) ALG	Chamseddine Harrag	29	2	26	2	3	0
20	MF	(Algeria) ALG	Farid Boughidah	31	1	28	1	3	0
	MF	(Algeria) ALG	Ibrahim Farhi	1	0	1	0	0	0
19	MF	(Algeria) ALG	Fares Brahimi	11	0	10	0	1	0
	MF	(Algeria) ALG	Si Mohamed Louh	5	0	5	0	0	0
10	MF	(Guinea) GUI	Mohamed Coumbassa	21	1	19	1	2	0
Forwards
22	FW	(Algeria) ALG	Hichem Khalfallah	31	2	28	2	3	0
	FW	(Algeria) ALG	Benamar Mellal	12	1	12	1	0	0
11	FW	(Algeria) ALG	Sofiane Younes	32	7	29	6	3	1
25	FW	(Algeria) ALG	Abdenour Hattabi	14	0	12	0	2	0
3	FW	(Algeria) ALG	Hadj Bouguèche	31	8	28	7	3	1
14	FW	(Algeria) ALG	Ibrahim Benachour	11	0	10	0	1	0
9	FW	(Algeria) ALG	Abdelkader Mehdi Meziane	24	4	21	3	3	1
27	FW	(Algeria) ALG	Yasser Gadi	1	0	1	0	0	0
Players transferred out during the season

Last updated: 11 June 2018

=== Goalscorers ===
Includes all competitive matches. The list is sorted alphabetically by surname when total goals are equal.

No.	Nat.	Player	Pos.	L 1	AC	TOTAL
3	(Algeria)	Hadj Bouguèche	FW	7	1	8
11	(Algeria)	Sofiane Younes	FW	6	1	7
9	(Algeria)	Abdelkader Mehdi Meziane	FW	3	1	4
22	(Algeria)	Hichem Khalfallah	FW	2	0	2
	(Algeria)	Benamar Mellal	FW	1	0	1
6	(Algeria)	Hamza Aït Ouamar	MF	3	0	3
28	(Algeria)	Chamseddine Harrag	MF	2	0	2
10	(Guinea)	Mohamed Coumbassa	MF	1	0	1
8	(Algeria)	Messaoud Gherbi	MF	1	0	1
20	(Algeria)	Farid Boughidah	MF	1	0	1
15	(Algeria)	Hadj Cheikh Boucherit	DF	1	0	1
Own Goals				0	0	0
Totals				28	3	31

== Transfers ==
=== In ===
Date	Pos	Player	From club	Transfer fee	Source
1 July 2015	GK	(Algeria) Moustapha Zeghba	AB Merouana	Free transfer	
1 July 2015	MF	(Algeria) Farid Boughida	(France) Bergerac Périgord	Free transfer	
1 July 2015	MF	(Guinea) Mohamed Coumbassa	(Guinea) Horoya AC	Undisclosed	
11 July 2015	DF	(Algeria) Ahmed Boumediene	IRB El Hadjar	Free transfer	
18 July 2015	DF	(Algeria) Abderrahim Salem Dekhinet	CA Batna	Free transfer	
23 July 2015	DF	(Algeria) Hadj Cheikh Boucherit	AHM Hassi Messaoud	Free transfer	
30 July 2015	FW	(Algeria) Sofiane Younes	ES Sétif	Free transfer	
7 January 2016	DF	(Algeria) Hocine Chennoufi	GC Mascara	Free transfer	

=== Out ===
Date	Pos	Player	To club	Transfer fee	Source
3 July 2015	DF	(Algeria) Ryad Kenniche	ES Sétif	Free transfer	
25 July 2015	MF	(Madagascar) Ibrahim Amada	ES Sétif	Free transfer	
26 July 2015	FW	(Algeria) Lamine Abid	MC Alger	Loan one year	
