= 2014–15 USM El Harrach season =

USM El Harrach
2014–15 season
- Chairman: Mohamed Laib
- Head coach: Boualem Charef
- Stadium: Stade 1er Novembre 1954
- Ligue 1: 4th
- Algerian Cup: Round of 32
- Top goalscorer: League: Lamine Abid (9); All: Lamine Abid (9)

In the 2014–15 season, USM El Harrach is competing in the Ligue 1 for the 31st season, as well as the Algerian Cup. They will be competing in Ligue 1, and the Algerian Cup.

== Squad list ==
Players and squad numbers last updated on 1 September 2014.
Note: Flags indicate national team as has been defined under FIFA eligibility rules. Players may hold more than one non-FIFA nationality.

No.	Nat.	Position	Name	Date of birth (age)	Moving from
Goalkeepers
1	(France) (Algeria)	GK	Aiyoub Belabes	21 June 1993 (aged 21)	(France) US Quevilly
22	(Algeria)	GK	Houssam Limane	18 January 1990 (aged 24)	Youth system
55	(Algeria)	GK	Mohamed Seghir Kara Hacine	19 December 1991 (aged 23)	(Algeria) RC Arbaâ
Defenders
-	(Algeria)	RB	Abdelaziz Ali Guechi	1 November 1990 (aged 24)	(Algeria) RC Arbaâ
28	(Algeria)	RB	Samir Belkheir	9 November 1985 (aged 29)	(Algeria) MC Saïda
31	(Algeria)	RB	Arslane Mazari	6 January 1989 (aged 25)	(Algeria) MC Oran
19	(Algeria)	RB	Ilès Ziane Cherif	7 April 1984 (aged 30)	(Algeria) USM Alger
-	(Algeria)	RB	Mohamed Amine Bekakcha	8 December 1990 (aged 24)	(Algeria)
21	(Algeria)	RB	Zine El Abidine Boulekhoua	15 April 1990 (aged 24)	Youth system
93	(Algeria)	RB	Ryad Kenniche	30 April 1993 (aged 21)	Youth system
Midfielders
6	(Algeria)	CM	Hamza Aït Ouamar	6 December 1986 (aged 28)	(Algeria) CR Belouizdad
15	(Madagascar)	CM	Ibrahim Amada	28 February 1990 (aged 24)	(Algeria) AS Khroub
7	(Algeria)	CM	Billel Benaldjia	23 August 1988 (aged 26)	(Algeria) CR Belouizdad
8	(Algeria)	CM	Messaoud Gharbi	22 September 1983 (aged 31)	(Algeria) MC El Eulma
16	(Algeria)	CM	Chamseddine Harrag	10 August 1992 (aged 22)	Youth system
14	(Algeria)	CM	Ibrahim Abdallah Benachour	5 November 1986 (aged 28)	(Algeria) MC El Eulma
9	(Algeria)	CM	Samy Frioui	7 September 1991 (aged 23)	(Algeria) USM Alger
10	(Algeria)	CM	Yacine Medane	28 February 1993 (aged 21)	Youth system
Forwards
36	(Algeria)	RW	Lamine Abid	4 July 1991 (aged 23)	Youth system
11	(Algeria)	RW	Salim Boumechra	28 April 1983 (aged 31)	(Algeria) MC Oran
17	(Algeria)	RW	Billel Mebarki	10 January 1989 (aged 25)	(Algeria) JSM Béjaïa
34	(Algeria)	RW	Mohamed Tiaiba	26 July 1988 (aged 26)	(Algeria) ES Sétif
-	(Algeria)	RW	Hadj Bouguèche	7 December 1983 (aged 31)	(Algeria) USM Bel-Abbès

== Competitions ==
=== Overview ===
Competition	Record								Started round	Final position / round	First match	Last match
Competition	G	W	D	L	GF	GA	GD	Win %	Started round	Final position / round	First match	Last match
Ligue 1	30	13	4	13	30	32	−2	43.33	—N/a	4th	16 August 2014	29 May 2015
Algerian Cup	2	1	0	1	8	4	+4	50.00	Round of 64	Round of 32	13 December 2014	26 December 2014
Total	32	14	4	14	38	36	+2	43.75				

=== Ligue 1 ===
==== League table ====
Pos	Team	Pld	W	D	L	GF	GA	GD	Pts	Qualification or relegation
2	MO Béjaïa	30	12	11	7	36	23	+13	47	2016 CAF Champions League
3	MC Oran	30	11	11	8	19	19	0	44	2016 CAF Confederation Cup
4	USM El Harrach	30	13	4	13	30	32	−2	43	
5	CS Constantine	30	11	9	10	32	31	+1	42 (Note: CSC 3-1 CRB; CRB 1-1 CSC)	2016 CAF Confederation Cup
6	CR Belouizdad	30	11	9	10	27	34	−7	42	

Updated to match(es) played on 29 May 2015. Source: DZFoot
Rules for classification: 1) points; 2) head-to-head points; 3) head-to-head goal difference; 4) goal difference; 5) total goals; 6) fairplay ranking; 7) playoff

==== Results summary ====
Overall								Home						Away					
Pld	W	D	L	GF	GA	GD	Pts	W	D	L	GF	GA	GD	W	D	L	GF	GA	GD
0	0	0	0	0	0	0	0	0	0	0	0	0	0	0	0	0	0	0	0

Last updated: 29 December 2014.
Source: Competitive matches

==== Results by round ====
Round	1	2	3	4	5	6	7	8	9	10	11	12	13	14	15	16	17	18	19	20	21	22	23	24	25	26	27	28	29	30
Ground	H	H	A	H	A	H	A	H	A	H	A	H	A	H	A	A	A	H	A	H	A	H	A	H	A	H	A	H	A	H
Result	L	W	L	W	W	W	L	L	W	W	L	W	W	D	L	L	L	W	L	D	L	W	L	D	W	W	D	L	L	W
Position	13	8	12	8	4	2	2	5	2	1	4	4	2	1	3	5	6	3	5	7	7	6	9	8	6	2	4	5	6	4

Updated to match(es) played on 29 December 2014. Source: Competitive matches
A = Away; H = Home; W = Win; D = Draw; L = Loss

==== Matches ====
16 August 2014 1	USM El Harrach	0–1	RC Arbaâ	Réghaïa
17:00		Report	12' Darfalou	Stadium: Stade Boualem Bourada; Referee: Houasnia, Badache, Boulekrinet

23 August 2014 2	USM El Harrach	2–1	MC El Eulma	El Harrach
16:00	Abid 70'; Benachour 88'	Report	11' Derrardja	Stadium: Stade 1er Novembre 1954; Referee: Bachir, Etchiali, El Hadj Said

13 September 2014 3	CS Constantine	4–1	USM El Harrach	Constantine
19:00	Boulemdaïs 14', 37', 53'; Hadji 73'	Report	90' Abid	Stadium: Stade Mohamed Hamlaoui; Referee: Benbraham, Chebala, Aloua

19 September 2014 4	USM El Harrach	2–0	MC Oran	Algiers
16:00	Mazari 20'; Abid 66'	Report		Stadium: Stade 1er Novembre 1954; Referee: Bichari, Gourari, Salouandj

27 September 2014 5	USM Alger	0–1	USM El Harrach	Algiers
17:45	Khoualed (yellow card) 20'; Bouchema (yellow card) 30'; Koudri (yellow card) 44'; Belaïli (red card) 80'	Report	57' Aït Ouamar; (yellow card) 36' Mazari; (yellow card) 83' Benachour	Stadium: Stade Omar Hammadi; Referee: Achouri, Amri, Bougherara

2 October 2014 6	USM El Harrach	2–0	USM Bel-Abbès	Algiers
16:00	Abid 4'; Benachour 34'	Report		Stadium: Stade 1er Novembre 1954; Referee: Abid Charef, Boulfelfel, Maghlout

18 October 2014 7	JS Saoura	1–0	USM El Harrach	Béchar
15:00	Sayah 15'	Report		Stadium: Stade 20 Août 1955; Referee: Bouchama, Bourahli, Saadi

25 October 2014 8	USM El Harrach	0–1	ASO Chlef	El Harrach
16:00		Report	28' (o.g.) Ziane Cherif	Stadium: Stade 1er Novembre 1954; Referee: Aouina, Benaissa, Chenaoua

1 November 2014 9	ASM Oran	1–3	USM El Harrach	Oran
16:00	Djemaouni 23'	Report	38' (pen.) Amada; 49' Mebarki; 87' Abid	Stadium: Stade Ahmed Zabana; Referee: Arab, Aïssaoui, Beyoud

8 November 2014 10	USM El Harrach	2–1	MO Bejaia	El Harrach
15:00	Keniche 25'; Abid 49'	Report	45+1' Hamzaoui	Stadium: Stade 1er Novembre 1954; Referee: Bekouassa, Bounoua, Rachedi

22 November 2014 11	ES Sétif	2–0	USM El Harrach	Sétif
17:45	Djahnit 7'; Megateli 30'	Report		Stadium: Stade 8 Mai 1945; Referee: Boukhalfa, Benali, Zerhouni

28 November 2014 12	USM El Harrach	1–0	MC Alger	Algiers
15:00	Abid 72'	Report		Stadium: Stade 1er Novembre 1954; Referee: Amalou, Azrine, Benbachir

19 December 2014 13	NA Hussein Dey	1–2	USM El Harrach	Algiers
16:00	Metref 25' (pen.)	Report	12' Boumechra; 65' (pen.) Abid	Stadium: Stade 20 Août 1955; Referee: Abid Charef, Boulfelfel, Teman

20 December 2014 14	USM El Harrach	0–0	JS Kabylie	Algiers
14:30		Report		Stadium: Stade 1er Novembre 1954; Referee: Mial, Gourari, Salaouadji

30 December 2014 15	CR Belouizdad	1–0	USM El Harrach	Algiers
16:00	Balegh 67'	Report		Stadium: Stade 20 Août 1955; Referee: Bichari, Gourari, Salaouadji

20 January 2015 16	RC Arbaâ	1–0	USM El Harrach	Larbaâ
14:00	Darfalou 76'	Report		Stadium: Stade Ismaïl Makhlouf; Attendance: 0 (close doors); Referee: Necib, Tamen, Maghlout

24 January 2015 17	MC El Eulma	4–1	USM El Harrach	El Eulma
16:00	Bouzama 24'; Derrardja 45'; Hamiti 55'; Kara 90+3'	Report	56' Ziane Cherif	Stadium: Stade Messaoud Zougar; Referee: Benbrahem, Alaoua, Chelaoui

31 January 2015 18	USM El Harrach	1–0	CS Constantine	Algiers
15:00	Abid 74'	Report		Stadium: Stade 1er Novembre 1954; Referee: Boukhalfa, Zerhouni, Ayad

7 February 2015 19	MC Oran	1–0	USM El Harrach	Oran
16:00	Nekkache 45+1'	Report		Stadium: Stade Ahmed Zabana; Referee: Arab, Bazine, Bioud

10 February 2015 20	USM El Harrach	0–0	USM Alger	Algiers
15:00	Keniche (yellow card) 13'; Kara (yellow card) 90+4'	Report	(yellow card) 58' Belaïli; (yellow card) 60' Benkhemassa; (yellow card) 90+2' Chafaï	Stadium: Stade 1er Novembre 1954; Referee: Houasnia, Bounoua, Boulkrinet

27 February 2015 21	USM Bel-Abbès	2–1	USM El Harrach	Sidi Bel Abbès
16:00	Choubani 2'; Mayele 19'	Report	57' Bouguèche	Stadium: Stade 24 Fevrier 1956; Referee: Zouaoui, Aouina, Kechida

7 March 2015 22	USM El Harrach	1–0	JS Saoura	Algiers
15:00	Boumechra 30'	Report		Stadium: Stade 1er Novembre 1954; Referee: Abid Charef, Tamen, Boulfelfel

20 March 2015 23	ASO Chlef	2–1	USM El Harrach	Chlef
17:00	Namani 43', 56'	Report	73' (pen.) Amada	Stadium: Stade Mohamed Boumezrag; Referee: Bahloul, Boulfelfel, Amri

28 March 2015 24	USM El Harrach	3–3	ASM Oran	Algiers
16:00	Kenniche 20'; Mazari 31'; Boumechra 90'	Report	12', 36' Djemaouni; 48' Aouad	Stadium: Stade 1er Novembre 1954; Referee: Aouina, Benaïssa, Chenaoua

17 April 2015 25	MO Béjaïa	0–1	USM El Harrach	Béjaïa
16:00		Report	90+4' Benachour	Stadium: Stade de l'Unité Maghrébine; Referee: Bessiri, Ghermouli, Cherchar

25 April 2015 26	USM El Harrach	1–0	ES Sétif	Algiers
17:00	Bouguèche 55'	Report		Stadium: Stade 1er Novembre 1954; Referee: Boukhalfa, Etchiali, Zerhouni

9 May 2015 27	MC Alger	1–1	USM El Harrach	Algiers
17:00	Aouedj 57'	Report	68' Boulakhoua	Stadium: Stade Omar Hammadi; Referee: Amalou, Bounoua, Azrine

16 May 2015 28	USM El Harrach	1–2	NA Hussein Dey	El Harrach
17:00	Amada 49' (pen.)	Report	25' (pen.) Bendebka; 59' Madi	Stadium: Stade 1er Novembre 1954; Referee: Bichari, Gourari, Salaouadji

23 May 2015 29	JS Kabylie	1–0	USM El Harrach	Tizi Ouzou
17:00	Abdul-Raheem 80'	Report		Stadium: Stade du 1er Novembre 1954; Attendance: 0 Referee: Aouina, Bazine, Benaïssa

29 May 2015 30	USM El Harrach	2–1	CR Belouizdad	Algiers
17:00	Kenniche 42'; Bouguèche 45'	Report	90' Toumi	Stadium: Stade 1er Novembre 1954; Referee: Necib, Meghout, Bennacer

== Algerian Cup ==
13 December 2014 Round of 64	USM El Harrach	8–2	US Tighenif	Algiers
14:00	Laribi 2'; Amada 10' (pen.); Tiaiba 27' (pen.); Boumechra 25', 51', 80'; Harrag 73'; Hattabi 75'	Repport	55' Abderezak; 57' Meziane	Stadium: Stade 1er Novembre 1954; Attendance: 2.000; Referee: Bahloul, Saâdi, Benmira

26 December 2014 Round of 32	USM Alger	2–0	USM El Harrach	Bologhine
16:00	Chafaï 40'; Andria 74'; Khoualed (yellow card) 18'; Bouchema (yellow card) 82'; Koudri (yellow card) 86'	Repport	(yellow card) 31' Mazari; (yellow card) 32' Mebarki; (yellow card) 66' Kara; (yellow card) 83' Boumechra; (yellow card) 86' Harrag; (yellow card) 90+1' Ziane Cherif	Stadium: Stade Omar Hammadi; Attendance: 18.000; Referee: Bekouassa, Bounoua, Rachedi

== Squad information ==
=== Playing statistics ===
No.	Pos	Nat	Player	Total		Ligue 1		Algerian Cup	
No.	Pos	Nat	Player	Apps	Goals	Apps	Goals	Apps	Goals
Goalkeepers
	GK	(Algeria) ALG	[[]]	0	0	0	0	0	0
	GK	(Algeria) ALG	[[]]	0	0	0	0	0	0
Defenders
	DF	(Algeria) ALG	[[]]	0	0	0	0	0	0
	DF	(Algeria) ALG	[[]]	0	0	0	0	0	0
	DF	(Algeria) ALG	[[]]	0	0	0	0	0	0
	DF	(Algeria) ALG	[[]]	0	0	0	0	0	0
Midfielders
	MF	(Algeria) ALG	[[]]	0	0	0	0	0	0
	MF	(Algeria) ALG	[[]]	0	0	0	0	0	0
	MF	(Algeria) ALG	[[]]	0	0	0	0	0	0
	MF	(Algeria) ALG	[[]]	0	0	0	0	0	0
Forwards
	FW	(Algeria) ALG	[[]]	0	0	0	0	0	0
	FW	(Algeria) ALG	[[]]	0	0	0	0	0	0
	FW	(Algeria) ALG	[[]]	0	0	0	0	0	0
	FW	(Algeria) ALG	[[]]	0	0	0	0	0	0
Players transferred out during the season

Last updated: 11 June 2018

=== Goalscorers ===
Includes all competitive matches. The list is sorted alphabetically by surname when total goals are equal.

No.	Nat.	Player	Pos.	L 1	AC	TOTAL
36	(Algeria)	Lamine Abid	FW	9	0	9
11	(Algeria)	Salim Boumechra	FW	3	3	6
15	(Algeria)	Ibrahim Amada	MF	3	1	4
14	(Algeria)	Ibrahim Abdallah Benachour	MF	3	0	3
93	(Algeria)	Ryad Kenniche	DF	3	0	3
31	(Algeria)	Arslane Mazari	DF	2	0	2
6	(Algeria)	Hamza Aït Ouamar	MF	1	0	1
21	(Algeria)	Zine El Abidine Boulekhoua	DF	1	0	1
17	(Algeria)	Billel Mebarki	FW	1	0	1
16	(Algeria)	Chamseddine Harrag	MF	0	1	1
34	(Algeria)	Mohamed Tiaiba	FW	0	1	1
19	(Algeria)	Ilès Ziane Cherif	DF	1	0	1
	(Algeria)	Hocine Laribi	DF	0	1	1
	(Algeria)	Abd El Nour Hattabi	DF	0	1	1
Own Goals				3	0	3
Totals				30	8	38
