= 2017–18 USM El Harrach season =

USM El Harrach
2017–18 season
- Head coach: Younès Ifticen (from 17 July 2017) (until 16 September 2017); Hamadi Dhaou (from 1 October 2017) (until 5 January 2018)
- Stadium: Stade 1er Novembre 1954
- Ligue 1: 15th
- Algerian Cup: Round of 32
- Top goalscorer: League: Hadj Bouguèche (6); All: Hadj Bouguèche (6)

In the 2017–18 season, USM El Harrach is competing in the Ligue 1 for the 34th season, as well as the Algerian Cup.

== Competitions ==
=== Overview ===
Competition	Record								Started round	Final position / round	First match	Last match
Competition	G	W	D	L	GF	GA	GD	Win %	Started round	Final position / round	First match	Last match
Ligue 1	30	7	7	16	27	37	−10	23.33	—N/a	15th	26 August 2017	19 May 2018
Algerian Cup	2	0	1	1	0	1	−1	0.00	Round of 64	Round of 32	30 December 2017	13 January 2018
Total	32	7	8	17	27	38	−11	21.88				

Updated to match played 9 May 2017
Source: Competitions

== League table ==
Pos	Team	Pld	W	D	L	GF	GA	GD	Pts	Qualification or relegation
12	CR Belouizdad	30	7	15	8	24	27	−3	36 (Note: Ranked on head-to-head results.)	
13	Olympique de Médéa	30	8	12	10	23	32	−9	36	
14	US Biskra (R)	30	9	7	14	23	30	−7	34	Relegation to Algerian Ligue Professionnelle 2
15	USM El Harrach (R)	30	7	7	16	27	37	−10	28	Relegation to Algerian Ligue Professionnelle 2
16	USM Blida (R)	30	5	8	17	28	50	−22	23	Relegation to Algerian Ligue Professionnelle 2

Updated to match(es) played on 19 May 2018. Source: DZFoot
Rules for classification: 1) points; 2) head-to-head points; 3) head-to-head goal difference; 4) goal difference; 5) total goals; 6) fairplay ranking; 7) playoff.
(R) Relegated

=== Results summary ===
Overall								Home						Away					
Pld	W	D	L	GF	GA	GD	Pts	W	D	L	GF	GA	GD	W	D	L	GF	GA	GD
30	7	7	16	27	37	−10	28	5	4	6	19	17	+2	2	3	10	8	20	−12

Last updated: 30 January 2016.
Source: Competitive matches

=== Results by round ===
Round	1	2	3	4	5	6	7	8	9	10	11	12	13	14	15	16	17	18	19	20	21	22	23	24	25	26	27	28	29	30
Ground																														
Result	L	L	L	D	L	L	L	W	W	D	D	L	L	L	W	D	W	L	D	D	L	W	L	W	D	L	L	L	W	L
Position	12	13	14	14	16	15	16	15	14	15	14	15	15	15	15	14	14	15	15	15	15	14	14	13	14	15	15	15	15	15

Source: Competitive matches
A = Away; H = Home; W = Win; D = Draw; L = Loss

=== Matches ===
Win Draw Loss

26 August 2017 Round 1	ES Sétif	2–1	USM El Harrach	Sétif
19:00	Nessakh 32'; Mazari 66' (o.g.)	report Live TV: None	8' Kherbache	Stadium: Stade 8 Mai 1945; Attendance: 0 (close doors); Referee: Mohamed Boukhalfa

8 September 2017 Round 2	USM El Harrach	1–2	CR Belouizdad	Bologhine
18:00	Banouh 90+3' (pen.)	Soccerway report Live TV: None	76' Chebira; 82' Aribi	Stadium: Omar Hamadi Stadium; Attendance: 0 (close doors); Referee: Mehdi Abid Charef; Man of the Match: Lakroum

15 September 2017 Round 3	Olympique de Médéa	1–0	USM El Harrach	Médéa
16:00	Benali 59'	Soccerway report Live TV: EPTV Terrestre / Algérie 3		Stadium: Stade Imam Lyes de Médéa; Referee: Mustapha Ghorbal

23 September 2017 Round 4	USM El Harrach	1–1	CS Constantine	Belouizdad
17:00	Mellel 14' (pen.)	Soccerway report Live TV: None	26' Cissé	Stadium: Stade 20 Août 1955; Referee: Said Aouina

24 October 2017 Round 5	USM Alger	2–0	USM El Harrach	Bologhine
17:00	Darfalou 2'; Hammar 87'	Soccerway report Live TV: Canal Algérie		Stadium: Omar Hamadi Stadium; Referee: Nabil Boukhalfa

14 October 2017 Round 6	USM El Harrach	2–3	MC Oran	Belouizdad
16:00	Mellel 52' (pen.); Banouh 57'	Soccerway report Live TV: Canal Algérie / Algérie 3	23' Bentiba; 89' Souibaâh; 90+3' Aouad	Stadium: Stade 20 Août 1955; Referee: Abderrezzak Arab

17 October 2017 Round 7	JS Kabylie	2–1	USM El Harrach	Tizi Ouzou
17:00	Ekedi 30'; Benaldjia 46'	Soccerway report Live TV: None	22' Banouh	Stadium: November 1, 1954 Stadium; Referee: Mustapha Ghorbal

20 October 2017 Round 8	USM El Harrach	2–0	USM Blida	Belouizdad
16:00	Bouguèche 21'; Banouh 30'	Soccerway report Live TV: EPTV Terrestre / Algérie 3		Stadium: Stade 20 Août 1955; Referee: Lahlou Benbraham

27 October 2017 Round 9	Paradou AC	2–3	USM El Harrach	Bologhine
16:00	Bouchina 7'; Naidji 31'	Soccerway report Live TV: EPTV Terrestre	4' Benrokia; 45+1' (pen.), 61' Mellel	Stadium: Omar Hamadi Stadium; Referee: Mustapha Bessiri

4 November 2017 Round 10	USM El Harrach	0–0	NA Hussein Dey	Algiers
15:00		Soccerway report Live TV: None		Stadium: Stade 1er Novembre 1954; Referee: Ahmed Bouzrar

11 November 2017 Round 11	DRB Tadjenanet	1–1	USM El Harrach	Tadjenanet
15:00	Hadded 70'	report Live TV: None	52' Banouh	Stadium: Lahoua Smaïl Stadium; Referee: Abderrezzak Arab

17 November 2017 Round 12	USM El Harrach	1–2	USM Bel-Abbès	Algiers
15:00	Bouguèche 70'	Soccerway report Live TV: None	10', 61' Zouari	Stadium: Stade 1er Novembre 1954; Referee: Farouk Mial

1 December 2017 Round 13	JS Saoura	1–0	USM El Harrach	Béchar
18:00	Djallit 61'	Soccerway report Live TV: None		Stadium: Stade 20 Août 1955; Referee: Amine Hansal

7 December 2017 Round 14	MC Alger	2–0	USM El Harrach	Algiers
17:45	Hachoud 64'; Bendebka 66'	Soccerway report Live TV: TV Tamazight 4		Stadium: July 5, 1962 Stadium; Referee: Nabil Boukhalfa

16 December 2017 Round 15	USM El Harrach	1–0	US Biskra	Algiers
15:00	Benrokia 35'	Soccerway report Live TV: None		Stadium: Stade 1er Novembre 1954; Referee: Lahlou Benbraham

5 January 2018 Round 16	USM El Harrach	0–0	ES Sétif	El Harrach
16:00		Soccerway report Live TV: None		Stadium: November 1, 1954 Stadium; Attendance: 0 (close doors); Referee: Ahmed Bouzrar

19 January 2018 Round 17	CR Belouizdad	0–1	USM El Harrach	Belouizdad
16:00		Soccerway report Live TV: Algérie 3 / TV Tamazight 4	54' Bouguèche	Stadium: Stade 20 Août 1955; Referee: Nabil Boukhalfa

27 January 2018 Round 18	USM El Harrach	2–3	Olympique de Médéa	Algiers
15:00	Benrokia 6'; Mellel 49'	Soccerway report Live TV: None	21' Abdelhafid; 62', 72' Boucherit	Stadium: Stade 1er Novembre 1954; Referee: Mustapha Bessiri

9 February 2018 Round 19	CS Constantine	0–0	USM El Harrach	Constantine
17:45		Soccerway report Live TV: Algérie 3 / Canal Algérie		Stadium: Stade Mohamed Hamlaoui; Referee: Said Aouina

16 February 2018 Round 20	USM El Harrach	0–0	USM Alger	Algiers
16:00		Soccerway report Live TV: None		Stadium: Stade 1er Novembre 1954; Referee: Abderrezzak Arab

23 February 2018 Round 21	MC Oran	1–0	USM El Harrach	Oran
16:00	Chibane 70'	Soccerway report Live TV: EPTV Terrestre / Canal Algérie		Stadium: Ahmed Zabana Stadium; Referee: Ahmed Bouzrar

9 March 2018 Round 22	USM El Harrach	2–0	JS Kabylie	El Harrach
16:00	Bougueroua 11'; Bouguèche 74'	Soccerway report Live TV: None		Stadium: November 1, 1954 Stadium; Referee: Mehdi Abid Charef

16 March 2018 Round 23	USM Blida	2–0	USM El Harrach	Blida
16:00	Frioui 7', 89'	Soccerway report Live TV: None		Stadium: Brakni Brothers Stadium; Referee: Mustapha Ghorbal

31 March 2018 Round 24	USM El Harrach	2–1	Paradou AC	Algiers
16:00	Bouguèche 60' (pen.); Fekih 86'	Soccerway report Live TV: None	42' Naidji	Stadium: Stade 1er Novembre 1954; Referee: Said Aouina

7 April 2018 Round 25	NA Hussein Dey	1–1	USM El Harrach	Belouizdad
16:00	Addadi 29' (pen.)	Soccerway report Live TV: Canal Algérie	43' Bouguèche	Stadium: Stade 20 Août 1955; Referee: Farouk Mial

20 April 2018 Round 26	USM El Harrach	1–2	DRB Tadjenanet	Belouizdad
16:00	Khelili 76'	Soccerway report Live TV: None	55' Belmokhtar; 78' Terbah	Stadium: Stade 20 Août 1955; Referee: Mustapha Bessiri

24 April 2018 Round 27	USM Bel-Abbès	1–0	USM El Harrach	Sidi Bel Abbès
16:00	Zouari 61'	Soccerway report Live TV: None		Stadium: Stade 24 Fevrier 1956; Referee: Lahlou Benbraham

4 May 2018 Round 28	USM El Harrach	2–3	JS Saoura	Algiers
16:00	Belarbi 32'; Mazari 68'	Soccerway report Live TV: None	19' Bekakchi; 24' (pen.) Djallit; 85' (pen.) Bourdim	Stadium: Stade 1er Novembre 1954; Attendance: 0 (close doors); Referee: Said Aouina

11 May 2018 Round 29	USM El Harrach	2–0	MC Alger	Algiers
16:00	Ait Abdelmalek 10'; Nekrouf 83'	Soccerway report Live TV: None		Stadium: Stade 1er Novembre 1954; Attendance: 0 (close doors); Referee: Mohamed Saïdi

19 May 2018 Round 30	US Biskra	2–0	USM El Harrach	Biskra
16:00	Berbache 9', 29'	Soccerway report Live TV: None		Stadium: El Alia Sports Complex; Referee: Ramdane Oukil

== Algerian Cup ==
30 December 2017 Round of 64	NRB Touggourt	0–0 (a.e.t.) (2–4 p)	USM El Harrach	Touggourt
14:00		Report; Live TV: None		Stadium: Mohamed Chabani Stadium; Referee: Bahloul, Saâdi, Benamia

13 January 2018 Round of 32	US Biskra	1–0	USM El Harrach	Biskra
14:00	Yokkoub Anani 40'	Report; Live TV: None		Stadium: El Alia Sports Complex; Referee: Mohamed Saïdi

== Squad information ==
=== Playing statistics ===
No.	Pos	Nat	Player	Total		Ligue 1		Algerian Cup	
No.	Pos	Nat	Player	Apps	Goals	Apps	Goals	Apps	Goals
Goalkeepers
1	GK	(Algeria) ALG	Mohamed El Mehdi Mecheri	1	0	1	0	0	0
16	GK	(Algeria) ALG	Abderaouf Belhani	6	0	6	0	0	0
30	GK	(Algeria) ALG	Sid Ahmed Rafik Mazouzi	15	0	15	0	0	0
Defenders
3	DF	(Algeria) ALG	Abdelmoumen Kherbache	11	1	11	1	0	0
4	DF	(Algeria) ALG	Abdelmalek Djeghbala	12	0	12	0	0	0
5	DF	(Algeria) ALG	Arslane Mazari	23	1	23	1	0	0
7	DF	(Algeria) ALG	Billel Benaldjia	8	0	8	0	0	0
15	DF	(Algeria) ALG	Abderrezak Bitam	12	0	12	0	0	0
19	DF	(Algeria) ALG	Abdelhak Debbari	23	0	23	0	0	0
20	DF	(Algeria) ALG	Sofiane Khelili	24	1	24	1	0	0
22	DF	(Algeria) ALG	Karim Nemdil	23	0	23	0	0	0
27	DF	(Algeria) ALG	Fayçal Hocine Chennoufi	3	0	3	0	0	0
	DF	(Algeria) ALG	Mhamed Riadh Hamida	3	0	3	0	0	0
	DF	(Algeria) ALG	Mohamed Chems Eddine Boutaleb	2	0	2	0	0	0
	DF	(Algeria) ALG	Mohamed Riad Boussafsaf	1	0	1	0	0	0
	DF	(Algeria) ALG	Mohamed Boukerdouh	1	0	1	0	0	0
Midfielders
6	MF	(Algeria) ALG	Zakaria Benhocine	14	0	14	0	0	0
8	MF	(Algeria) ALG	Mourad Delhoum	4	0	4	0	0	0
9	MF	(Algeria) ALG	Mohamed Ismail Kherbache	6	0	6	0	0	0
10	MF	(Algeria) ALG	Karim Baïteche	14	0	14	0	0	0
18	MF	(Algeria) ALG	Djelloul Benrokia	23	3	23	3	0	0
23	MF	(Algeria) ALG	Farid Daoud	21	0	21	0	0	0
24	MF	(Algeria) ALG	Yacine Medane	9	0	9	0	0	0
29	MF	(Algeria) ALG	Sofiane Younes	8	0	8	0	0	0
32	MF	(Algeria) ALG	Kamel Belarbi	21	1	21	1	0	0
	MF	(Algeria) ALG	Assad Lakdja	6	0	6	0	0	0
	MF	(Algeria) ALG	Riad Ait Abdelmalek	11	1	11	1	0	0
	MF	(Algeria) ALG	Mohamed Reda Nekrouf	3	1	3	1	0	0
	MF	(Algeria) ALG	Mohamed Layati	9	0	9	0	0	0
	MF	(Algeria) ALG	Riadh Bouchemit	3	0	3	0	0	0
	MF	(Algeria) ALG	Oussama Herkat	1	0	1	0	0	0
Forwards
9	FW	(Algeria) ALG	Hamza Banouh	14	5	14	5	0	0
11	FW	(Algeria) ALG	Hadj Bouguèche	25	6	25	6	0	0
13	FW	(Algeria) ALG	Mounir Fekih	6	1	6	1	0	0
14	FW	(Algeria) ALG	Abdellatif Moustfaoui	1	0	1	0	0	0
17	FW	(Algeria) ALG	Benamar Mellel	25	5	25	5	0	0
21	FW	(Algeria) ALG	Adel Bougueroua	4	1	4	1	0	0
	FW	(Algeria) ALG	Daoud Boussiala	3	0	3	0	0	0
	FW	(Algeria) ALG	Hichem Fekiri	1	0	1	0	0	0
	FW	(Algeria) ALG	Fares Amrane	1	0	1	0	0	0
Players transferred out during the season
	GK	(Algeria) ALG	Mohamed Seddik Mokrani	8	0	8	0	0	0
	FW	(Algeria) ALG	Billel Mebarki	7	0	7	0	0	0

Last updated: 28 May 2018
Source: fr.soccerway.com

== Squad list ==
As of August 25, 2017. Note: Flags indicate national team as defined under FIFA eligibility rules; some limited exceptions apply. Players may hold more than one non-FIFA nationality.

No.	Pos.	Nation	Player
1	GK	ALG	Mohamed El Mehdi Mecheri
3	DF	ALG	Abdelmoumen Kherbache
4	DF	ALG	Abdelmalek Djeghbala
5	DF	ALG	Arslane Mazari
6	MF	ALG	Zakaria Benhocine
7	MF	ALG	Billel Benaldjia
8	MF	ALG	Mourad Delhoum
9	FW	ALG	Hamza Banouh
10	MF	ALG	Karim Baïteche
11	FW	ALG	Hadj Bouguèche (captain)
15	DF	ALG	Abderrezak Bitam
16	GK	ALG	Mohamed Seddik Mokrani

No.	Pos.	Nation	Player
17	FW	ALG	Benamar Mellel
18	MF	ALG	Djelloul Ben Rokia
19	DF	ALG	Abdelhak Debbari
20	DF	ALG	Sofiane Khelili
21	MF	ALG	Billel Mebarki
22	DF	ALG	Karim Nemdil
23	MF	ALG	Farid Daoud
24	MF	ALG	Yacine Medane
30	GK	ALG	Sid Ahmed Rafik Mazouzi
32	MF	ALG	Kamel Belarbi
-	MF	ALG	Mohamed Gougam
-	MF	ALG	Abdellatif Moustfaoui

== Transfers ==
=== In ===
Date	Pos	Player	From club	Transfer fee	Source
15 July 2017	GK	(Algeria) Sid Ahmed Rafik Mazouzi	CA Batna	Free transfer	
16 July 2017	GK	(Algeria) Abderrezak Bitam	CA Batna	Free transfer	
18 July 2017	MF	(Algeria) Billel Benaldjia	USM Bel-Abbès	Free transfer	
19 July 2017	DF	(Algeria) Sofiane Khelili	JS Kabylie	Free transfer	
20 July 2017	MF	(Algeria) Zakaria Benhocine	NA Hussein Dey	Free transfer	
21 July 2017	MF	(Algeria) Farid Daoud	CA Batna	Free transfer	
23 July 2017	MF	(Algeria) Karim Nemdil	CR Belouizdad	Free transfer	
26 July 2017	FW	(Algeria) Hadj Bouguèche	MC Alger	Free transfer	
30 July 2017	MF	(Algeria) Mourad Delhoum	MC Oran	Free transfer	
30 July 2017	MF	(Algeria) Karim Baïteche	JS Kabylie	Free transfer	
30 July 2017	FW	(Algeria) Hamza Banouh	Olympique de Médéa	Free transfer	
7 January 2018	FW	(Algeria) Sofiane Younes	Olympique de Médéa	Free transfer (Released)	

=== Out ===
Date	Pos	Player	To club	Transfer fee	Source
16 June 2017	MF	(Algeria) Chamseddine Harrag	NA Hussein Dey	Free transfer	
27 June 2017	FW	(Algeria) Sofiane Younes	Olympique de Médéa	Free transfer	
24 December 2017	GK	(Algeria) Mohamed Seddik Mokrani	JS Saoura	Free transfer (Released)	
13 January 2018	MF	(Algeria) Billel Mebarki	USM Bel-Abbès	Free transfer	
