= El Harrach (disambiguation) =

El Harrach is a town and commune in Algeria.

It may also refer to:

== Places ==
- El Harrach District, a district in Algeria.
- Oued El Harrach, a river in Algeria.
- El Harrach Stadium, a stadium in Algeria.

== Transport ==
- El Harrach Centre Station, a metro station in Algeria.
- El Harrach Gare Station, a metro station in Algeria.

== History ==
- Massacre of El Harrach (1832), a massacre during the French conquest of Algeria.

== Sport ==
- USM El Harrach, a football club in Algeria.
