= 2016–17 USM El Harrach season =

USM El Harrach
2016–17 season
- Chairman: Mohamed Laib
- Head coach: Boualem Charef (until 12 May 2017); Nacer Bechouche and Hassan Benomar (from 14 May 2017)
- Stadium: Stade 1er Novembre 1954
- Ligue 1: 13th
- Algerian Cup: Round of 16
- Top goalscorer: League: Merouane Dahar (4); All: Merouane Dahar; Benamar Mellel (4)

In the 2016–17 season, USM El Harrach competed in Ligue 1 for the 33rd season, as well as the Algerian Cup.

== Competitions ==
=== Overview ===
Competition	Record								Started round	Final position / round	First match	Last match
Competition	G	W	D	L	GF	GA	GD	Win %	Started round	Final position / round	First match	Last match
Ligue 1	30	7	15	8	15	21	−6	23.33	—N/a	13th	20 August 2016	14 June 2017
Algerian Cup	3	2	0	1	4	3	+1	66.67	Round of 64	Round of 16	26 November 2016	28 December 2016
Total	33	9	15	9	19	24	−5	27.27				

== League table ==
Pos	Team	Pld	W	D	L	GF	GA	GD	Pts	Qualification or relegation
11	JS Kabylie	30	8	14	8	20	24	−4	38 (Note: JS Kabylie ahead of Olympique de Médéa on head-to-head record: JSK–OMM 0–1, OMM–JSK 1–2.)	
12	Olympique de Médéa	30	10	8	12	32	40	−8	38	
13	USM El Harrach	30	7	15	8	15	21	−6	36 (Note: RC Relizane ahead of USM El Harrach on head-to-head record: RCR–UEH 0–0, UEH–RCR 0–0 however goal difference in the first leg RCR (−8) UEH (−1).)	
14	RC Relizane (Note: RC Relizane were deducted 3 points.) (R)	30	12	6	12	34	32	+2	36	Relegation to Ligue Professionnelle 2
15	CA Batna (R)	30	6	7	17	20	42	−22	25	Relegation to Ligue Professionnelle 2

Updated to match(es) played on 14 June 2017. Source: DZFoot
Rules for classification: 1) points; 2) head-to-head points; 3) head-to-head goal difference; 4) goal difference; 5) total goals; 6) fairplay ranking; 7) playoff.
(R) Relegated

=== Results summary ===
Overall								Home						Away					
Pld	W	D	L	GF	GA	GD	Pts	W	D	L	GF	GA	GD	W	D	L	GF	GA	GD
30	7	15	8	15	21	−6	36	4	9	2	10	9	+1	3	6	6	5	12	−7

Last updated: 30 January 2016.
Source: Competitive matches

=== Results by round ===
Round	1	2	3	4	5	6	7	8	9	10	11	12	13	14	15	16	17	18	19	20	21	22	23	24	25	26	27	28	29	30
Ground																														
Result	D	L	D	L	D	L	W	L	W	W	W	D	D	D	D	L	W	W	D	L	D	L	D	W	D	D	D	L	D	D
Position	9	13	14	15	15	15	13	14	14	13	12	12	12	9	9	10	10	8	9	10	10	10	10	10	10	10	10	11	13	13

Updated to match(es) played on 30 January 2016. Source: Competitive matches
A = Away; H = Home; W = Win; D = Draw; L = Loss

=== Matches ===
Win Draw Loss

20 August 2016 Round 1	USM Bel-Abbès	0–0	USM El Harrach	Sidi Bel Abbès
19:00		Soccerway report Live TV: None		Stadium: Stade 24 Fevrier 1956; Referee: Ahmed Bouzrar

27 August 2016 Round 2	USM El Harrach	1–2	MC Alger	Algiers
19:00	Harrag 28'	Report; Live TV: TV Tamazight 4	22' Boudebouda; 25' Mokdad	Stadium: Stade du 5 Juillet 1962; Referee: Mohamed Benouza

10 September 2016 Round 3	JS Kabylie	0–0	USM El Harrach	Tizi Ouzou
19:00		Report; Live TV: None		Stadium: Stade 1er Novembre 1954; Referee: Rafik Achouri

17 September 2016 Round 4	CA Batna	1–0	USM El Harrach	Batna
16:30	Hadj Aïssa 61'	Report; Live TV: None		Stadium: Stade Seffouhi; Referee: Redouane Necib

22 September 2016 Round 5	USM El Harrach	1–1	NA Hussein Dey	Algiers
17:00	Aichi 60'	Report; Live TV: None	49' (pen.) Gasmi	Stadium: Stade du 5 Juillet 1962; Attendance: 0 (close doors); Referee: Merzak Halalchi

30 September 2016 Round 6	MC Oran	1–0	USM El Harrach	Oran
16:00	Souibaah 6'	Report; Live TV: Algérie 3		Stadium: Stade Ahmed Zabana; Referee: Mehdi Abid Charef

15 October 2016 Round 7	USM El Harrach	1–0	DRB Tadjenanet	El Harrach
16:00	Younès 80'	Report; Live TV: None		Stadium: Stade 1er Novembre 1954; Referee: Abderrezzak Arab

22 October 2016 Round 8	JS Saoura	4–1	USM El Harrach	Béchar
19:00	Hammia 31' (pen.); Bourdim 39', 59'; Zaidi 90+2'	Report; Live TV: None	33' (pen.) Dahar	Stadium: Stade 20 Août 1955; Referee: Mohamed Benouza

5 November 2016 Round 10	USM Alger	0–2	USM El Harrach	Algiers
16:00		Report; Live TV: Algérie 3	38' Mellal; 90+5' Younes	Stadium: Stade 5 Juillet 1962; Referee: Merzak Halalchi

11 November 2016 Round 11	USM El Harrach	1–0	ES Sétif	El Harrach
15:30	Mellal 58'	Report; Live TV: None		Stadium: Stade 1er Novembre 1954; Referee: Mohamed Boukhalfa

19 November 2016 Round 12	CS Constantine	0–0	USM El Harrach	Constantine
16:00		Report; Live TV: Canal Algérie		Stadium: Stade Mohamed Hamlaoui; Referee: Said Aouina

2 December 2016 Round 13	USM El Harrach	1–1	CR Belouizdad	Algiers
16:00	Dahar 24'	Report; Live TV: Algérie 3	28' Lakroum	Stadium: July 5, 1962 Stadium; Referee: Lotfi Bekouassa

9 December 2016 Round 14	RC Relizane	0–0	USM El Harrach	Relizane
15:00		Report; Live TV: Canal Algérie		Stadium: Stade Tahar Zoughari; Referee: Ahmed Bouzrar

13 December 2016 Round 9	USM El Harrach	1–0	MO Béjaïa	El Harrach
15:00; Match rescheduled due to MO Béjaïa competing in the 2016 CAF Confederation Cup	Mellel 80'	Report; Live TV: None		Stadium: Stade 1er Novembre 1954; Referee: Rafik Achouri

23 December 2016 Round 15	USM El Harrach	0–0	Olympique de Médéa	El Harrach
15:00		Report; Live TV: None		Stadium: November 1, 1954 Stadium; Referee: Mohamed Benabdellah

21 January 2017 Round 16	USM El Harrach	0–2	USM Bel-Abbès	El Harrach
15:00		Report; Live TV: None	49' Zouari; 54' Bouguelmouna	Stadium: November 1, 1954 Stadium; Referee: Abderrezzak Arab

28 January 2017 Round 17	MC Alger	0–1	USM El Harrach	Algiers
16:00		Report; Live TV: TV Tamazight 4 / Algérie 3	59' Benamra	Stadium: July 5, 1962 Stadium; Referee: Lahlou Benbraham

2 February 2017 Round 18	USM El Harrach	1–0	JS Kabylie	El Harrach
15:00	Dahar 13' (pen.)	Report; Live TV: None		Stadium: November 1, 1954 Stadium; Referee: Rafik Achouri

11 February 2017 Round 19	USM El Harrach	1–1	CA Batna	El Harrach
15:00	Dahar 19'	Report; Live TV: None	71' Bitam	Stadium: November 1, 1954 Stadium; Attendance: 0 (close doors); Referee: Ahmed Bouzrar

16 February 2017 Round 20	NA Hussein Dey	3–0	USM El Harrach	Algiers
17:00	Gasmi 38' (pen.); Abid 45+2'; El Orfi 90+2'	Report; Live TV: Canal Algérie / TV Tamazight 4		Stadium: July 5, 1962 Stadium; Referee: Merzak Halalchi

23 February 2017 Round 21	USM El Harrach	0–0	MC Oran	El Harrach
15:00		Report; Live TV: None		Stadium: November 1, 1954 Stadium; Referee: Amine Hansal

4 March 2017 Round 22	DRB Tadjenanet	1–0	USM El Harrach	Tadjenanet
15:00	Djahel 3'	Report; Live TV: None		Stadium: Lahoua Smaïl Stadium; Referee: Mustapha Bessiri

11 March 2017 Round 23	USM El Harrach	0–0	JS Saoura	El Harrach
15:00		Report; Live TV: None		Stadium: November 1, 1954 Stadium; Referee: Mohamed Boukhalfa

17 March 2017 Round 24	MO Béjaïa	0–1	USM El Harrach	Béjaïa
16:00		Report; Live TV: None	90+3' Harrag	Stadium: Maghrebi Unity Stadium; Attendance: 0 (close doors); Referee: Abderrezzak Arab

7 May 2017 Round 25	USM El Harrach	1–1	USM Alger	Algiers
17:45	Younes 20'	Report; Live TV: Canal Algérie / Al-Kass Sports	57' Meftah	Stadium: July 5, 1962 Stadium; Referee: Abderrezzak Arab

13 May 2017 Round 26	ES Sétif	0–0	USM El Harrach	Sétif
18:00		Report; Live TV: TV Tamazight 4		Stadium: Stade 8 Mai 1945; Referee: Lahlou Benbraham

26 May 2017 Round 27	USM El Harrach	1–1	CS Constantine	El Harrach
16:00	Aichi 7'	Report; Live TV: None	75' Belkheir	Stadium: November 1, 1954 Stadium; Referee: Mustapha Bessiri

7 June 2017 Round 28	CR Belouizdad	2–0	USM El Harrach	Algiers
17:00	Feham 50' (pen.); Lakroum 90'	Report; Live TV: None		Stadium: July 5, 1962 Stadium; Referee: Mohamed Saïdi

10 June 2017 Round 29	USM El Harrach	0–0	RC Relizane	El Harrach
17:00		Report; Live TV: None		Stadium: November 1, 1954 Stadium; Referee: Ahmed Bouzrar

14 June 2017 Round 30	Olympique de Médéa	0–0	USM El Harrach	Médéa
17:00		Report; Live TV: TV Tamazight 4		Stadium: Stade Imam Lyes de Médéa; Referee: Said Aouina

== Algerian Cup ==
26 November 2016 Round of 64	MCB Oued Sly	1–2	USM El Harrach	Chlef
15:00	Ouadah 80'	Live TV: None	Aïchi 65'; Sayahi 74'	Stadium: Stade Mohamed Boumezrag; Referee: Bounedjmer, Kemam, Zemit

17 December 2016 Round of 32	USM El Harrach	2–1 (a.e.t.)	Olympique de Médéa	Mohamed Belouizdad
16:00	Harrag 44' (pen.); Mellel 111'	Live TV: Algérie 3	Hamia 89' (pen.)	Stadium: August 20, 1955 Stadium; Referee: Abid Charef, Boulfelfel, Benamira

28 December 2016 Round of 16	CA Bordj Bou Arréridj	1–0	USM El Harrach	Bordj Bou Arréridj
16:30	Benachour 39'	Live TV: Algérie 3		Stadium: August 20, 1955 Stadium; Referee: Ghorbal, Etchiali, Hadj Said

== Squad information ==
=== Playing statistics ===
No.	Pos	Nat	Player	Total		Ligue 1		Algerian Cup	
No.	Pos	Nat	Player	Apps	Goals	Apps	Goals	Apps	Goals
Goalkeepers
16	GK	(Algeria) ALG	Mohamed Seddik Mokrani	3	0	2	0	1	0
30	GK	(Algeria) ALG	Moustapha Zeghba	30	0	28	0	2	0
Defenders
12	DF	(Algeria) ALG	Fayçal Abdat	32	0	29	0	3	0
	DF	(Algeria) ALG	Kamel Belarbi	27	0	24	0	3	0
21	DF	(Algeria) ALG	Zine El Abidine Boulekhoua	28	0	25	0	3	0
27	DF	(Algeria) ALG	Fayçal Hocine Chennoufi	13	0	11	0	2	0
19	DF	(Algeria) ALG	Abdelhak Debbari	31	0	28	0	3	0
	DF	(Algeria) ALG	Mohamed Amine Madani	30	0	28	0	2	0
Midfielders
8	MF	(Algeria) ALG	Mounir Aichi	22	3	19	2	3	1
7	MF	(Algeria) ALG	Walid Athmani	11	0	10	0	1	0
18	MF	(Algeria) ALG	Djelloul Ben Rokia	5	0	5	0	0	0
4	MF	(Algeria) ALG	Abdelmalek Djeghbala	11	0	11	0	0	0
	MF	(Algeria) ALG	Zakaria Mustapha Hamidi	15	0	13	0	2	0
28	MF	(Algeria) ALG	Chamseddine Harrag	26	3	24	2	2	1
10	MF	(Algeria) ALG	Karim Hendou	8	0	8	0	0	0
	MF	(Algeria) ALG	Assad Lakdja	4	0	4	0	0	0
	MF	(Algeria) ALG	Mohamed Layati	8	0	6	0	2	0
17	MF	(Algeria) ALG	Benamar Mellel	30	4	27	3	3	1
25	MF	(Algeria) ALG	Mohamed Reda Nekrouf	2	0	2	0	0	0
	MF	(Algeria) ALG	Laid Ouadji	5	0	3	0	2	0
Forwards
29	FW	(Algeria) ALG	Marwane Benamra	11	1	11	1	0	0
	FW	(Algeria) ALG	Merouane Dahar	24	4	23	4	1	0
13	FW	(Algeria) ALG	Mounir Fekih	7	0	7	0	0	0
	FW	(Algeria) ALG	Oussama Gatal	3	0	2	0	1	0
14	FW	(Algeria) ALG	Mohamed Yazid Sayahi	23	1	20	0	3	1
11	FW	(Algeria) ALG	Sofiane Younes	32	3	29	3	3	0
Players transferred out during the season

Last updated: 11 June 2018

=== Goalscorers ===
Includes all competitive matches. The list is sorted alphabetically by surname when total goals are equal.

No.	Nat.	Player	Pos.	L 1	AC	TOTAL
	(Algeria)	Merouane Dahar	FW	4	0	4
17	(Algeria)	Benamar Mellel	MF	3	1	4
11	(Algeria)	Sofiane Younes	FW	3	0	3
28	(Algeria)	Chamseddine Harrag	MF	2	1	3
8	(Algeria)	Mounir Aichi	MF	2	1	3
29	(Algeria)	Marwane Benamra	FW	1	0	1
14	(Algeria)	Mohamed Yazid Sayahi	FW	0	1	1
Own Goals				0	0	0
Totals				15	4	19

== Squad list ==
As of January 15, 2017:

Note: Flags indicate national team as defined under FIFA eligibility rules; some limited exceptions apply. Players may hold more than one non-FIFA nationality.

No.	Pos.	Nation	Player
4	DF	ALG	Abdelmalek Djeghbala
5	DF	ALG	Mohamed Amine Madani
6	MF	ALG	Youcef Bouamrane
7	MF	ALG	Walid Athmani
8	FW	ALG	Mounir Aichi
10	MF	ALG	Karim Hendou
11	FW	ALG	Sofiane Younes
12	DF	ALG	Fayçal ABDAT
13	FW	ALG	Mounir Fekih
14	FW	ALG	Mohamed Yazid Sayahi
16	GK	ALG	Mohamed Seddik Mokrani

No.	Pos.	Nation	Player
17	FW	ALG	Benamar Mellel
18	MF	ALG	Djelloul Ben Rokia
19	MF	ALG	Abdelhak Debbari
21	DF	ALG	Zine El Abidine Boulekhoua
23	FW	ALG	Marouane Dahar
25	MF	ALG	Mohamed Reda Nekrouf
27	FW	ALG	Fayçal Hocine Chennoufi
28	DF	ALG	Chamseddine Harrag
29	DF	ALG	Marwane Benamra
30	GK	ALG	Moustapha Zeghba

== Transfers ==
=== In ===
Date	Pos	Player	From club	Transfer fee	Source
1 July 2016	FW	(Algeria) Lamine Abid	MC Alger	loan return	
1 July 2016	FW	(Algeria) Merouane Dahar	MC Oran	Free transfer	
1 July 2016	FW	(Algeria) Walid Athmani	MC Oran	Free transfer	

=== Out ===
Date	Pos	Player	To club	Transfer fee	Source
1 July 2016	MF	(Algeria) Messaoud Gharbi	CS Constantine	Undisclosed	
1 July 2016	DF	(Algeria) Mohamed Billel Benaldjia	DRB Tadjenanet	Undisclosed	
28 July 2016	FW	(Algeria) Lamine Abid	NA Hussein Dey	Undisclosed	
