= 2013–14 USM El Harrach season =

Football season

USM El Harrach
2013–14 season
- Chairman: Mohamed Laib
- Head coach: Boualem Charef
- Stadium: Stade 1er Novembre 1954
- Ligue 1: 5th
- Algerian Cup: Round of 64
- Top goalscorer: League: Lamine Abid (7); All: Lamine Abid (7)

In the 2013–14 season, USM El Harrach is competing in the Ligue 1 for the 30th season, as well as the Algerian Cup. They will be competing in Ligue 1, and the Algerian Cup.

== Competitions ==
=== Overview ===
Competition	Record								Started round	Final position / round	First match	Last match
Competition	G	W	D	L	GF	GA	GD	Win %	Started round	Final position / round	First match	Last match
Ligue 1	30	13	8	9	34	27	+7	43.33	—N/a	5th	24 August 2013	24 May 2014
Algerian Cup	1	0	0	1	1	2	−1	0.00	Round of 64		6 December 2013	
Total	31	13	8	10	35	29	+6	41.94				

Updated to match played 9 May 2017
Source: Competitions

== League table ==
Pos	Team	Pld	W	D	L	GF	GA	GD	Pts	Qualification or relegation
3	ES Sétif	30	15	8	7	40	27	+13	53	Qualification for the Champions League first round
4	MC El Eulma	30	13	9	8	38	28	+10	48	Qualification for the Champions League preliminary round
5	USM El Harrach (Note: USM El Harrach would have qualified for the CAF Confederation Cup preliminary round by finishing fourth in the 2013–14 Algerian Ligue Professionnelle 1, but due to the penalty imposed on them by CAF after their withdrawal from the 2014 CAF Champions League, they could not participate.)	30	13	8	9	34	27	+7	47	
6	MC Alger	30	13	6	11	26	25	+1	45	Qualification for the Confederation Cup preliminary round
7	RC Arbaâ (Note: RC Arbaâ would have qualified for the CAF Confederation Cup preliminary round by finishing seventh in the 2013–14 Algerian Ligue Professionnelle 1, after the elimination of the USM El Harrach but were unable to participate because they were not adopted by the CAF as a professional team.)	30	12	8	10	33	32	+1	44	

Updated to match(es) played on 22 May 2014. Source: DZFoot
Rules for classification: 1) points; 2) head-to-head points; 3) head-to-head goal difference; 4) goal difference; 5) total goals; 6) fairplay ranking; 7) playoff.

=== Results summary ===
Overall								Home						Away					
Pld	W	D	L	GF	GA	GD	Pts	W	D	L	GF	GA	GD	W	D	L	GF	GA	GD
0	0	0	0	0	0	0	0	0	0	0	0	0	0	0	0	0	0	0	0

Last updated: 29 December 2014.
Source: Competitive matches

=== Results by round ===
Round	1	2	3	4	5	6	7	8	9	10	11	12	13	14	15	16	17	18	19	20	21	22	23	24	25	26	27	28	29	30
Ground	A	H	A	H	A	H	A	H	A	H	A	H	A	H	H	H	A	H	H	H	A	H	A	H	A	H	A	H	A	A
Result	L	L	L	L	D	W	W	W	L	D	W	D	D	L	W	W	D	W	L	D	D	W	W	W	W	W	L	D	W	L
Position																														

Updated to match(es) played on 29 December 2014. Source: Competitive matches
A = Away; H = Home; W = Win; D = Draw; L = Loss

=== Matches ===
24 August 2013 Round 1	JS Saoura	3–1	USM El Harrach	Béchar
17:00	M. Mebarki 15', 45+1'; M. Amri 88'	Report	81' Azzi	Stadium: Stade 20 Août 1955; Referee: Redouane Necib

31 August 2013 Round 2	USM El Harrach	1–2	CS Constantine	Algiers
17:00	Younès 19'	Report	63' (pen.) Boucherit; 77' Boulemdaïs	Stadium: Stade 1er Novembre 1954; Referee: Mohamed Bachir

3 September 2013 Round 3	RC Arbaâ	2–1	USM El Harrach	Blida
17:00	Zeddam 5'; B. Abdelkadous 61'	Report	17' A. El Amali	Stadium: Stade Frères Brakni; Referee: Farouk Houasnia

13 September 2013 Round 4	USM El Harrach	1–2	USM Alger	Algiers
17:00	Hanitser 12'	Report	51' Frioui; 53' Andria	Stadium: Stade 1er Novembre 1954; Referee: Boubekeur Zouaoui

21 September 2013 Round 5	MC El Eulma	0–0	USM El Harrach	El Eulma
18:00		Report		Stadium: Stade Messaoud Zougar; Referee: Mohamed Saïdi

28 September 2013 Round 6	USM El Harrach	2–0	MC Oran	Algiers
16:00	Amada 82' (pen.); I. Sylla 89'	Report		Stadium: Stade 1er Novembre 1954; Referee: Abderrezzak Arab

5 October 2013 Round 7	CRB Aïn Fakroun	0–3	USM El Harrach	Aïn M'lila
16:00		Report		Stadium: Stade des Frères Demane Debbih; Referee: Said Aouina

19 October 2013 Round 8	USM El Harrach	3–0	JSM Béjaïa	Algiers
15:00	I. Sylla 17'; Boumechra 62' (pen.); Belkaroui 72' (pen.)	Report		Stadium: Stade 1er Novembre 1954; Referee: Rafik Achouri

25 October 2013 Round 9	CR Belouizdad	2–1	USM El Harrach	Algiers
17:00	Dahar 3', 44'	Report	36' (pen.) Amada	Stadium: Stade 20 Août 1955; Referee: Mohamed Ghorbal

2 November 2013 Round 10	USM El Harrach	0–0	ASO Chlef	Algiers
15:00		Report		Stadium: Stade 1er Novembre 1954; Referee: Boubekeur Zouaoui

8 November 2013 Round 11	MC Alger	0–1	USM El Harrach	Algiers
16:45		Report	12' I. Sylla	Stadium: Stade Omar Hamadi; Referee: Mohamed Bichari

23 November 2013 Round 12	USM El Harrach	0–0	JS Kabylie	Algiers
15:00		Report		Stadium: Stade 1er Novembre 1954; Referee: Mehdi Abid Charef

30 November 2013 Round 13	CA Bordj Bou Arréridj	0–0	USM El Harrach	Bordj Bou Arréridj
18:00		Report		Stadium: Stade 20 Août 1955; Referee: Youssef Zerrouki

14 December 2013 Round 14	USM El Harrach	0–2	ES Sétif	Algiers
15:00		Report	66' Touahri; 90+5' Djahnit	Stadium: Stade 1er Novembre 1954; Referee: Mustapha Ghorbal

28 December 2013 Round 15	USM El Harrach	2–0	MO Béjaïa	Algiers
15:00	Belkaroui 41'; Abid 71'	Report		Stadium: Stade 1er Novembre 1954; Referee: Abderrezzak Arab

18 January 2014 Round 16	USM El Harrach	1–0	JS Saoura	Algiers
15:00	Abid 17' (pen.)	Report		Stadium: Stade 1er Novembre 1954; Referee: Mehdi Abid Charef

1 February 2014 Round 17	CS Constantine	1–1	USM El Harrach	Constantine
16:00	Benatia 83'	Report	90' Boumechra	Stadium: Stade Mohamed Hamlaoui; Referee: Youssef Zerrouki

8 February 2014 Round 18	USM El Harrach	2–1	RC Arbaâ	Algiers
15:00	Younes 30'; Abid 59'	Report	15' Bougueroua	Stadium: Stade 1er Novembre 1954; Referee: Merzak Halalchi

15 February 2014 Round 19	USM Alger	2–1	USM El Harrach	Algiers
17:45	Chatal 5'; Feham 56' (pen.); Benamara (yellow card) 69'	Report	(yellow card) 35' Boulakhoua; (yellow card) 39' Younès; 45' I. Sylla; (yellow card) 51' Hendou; (yellow card) 55' Doukha; (yellow card) 81' Amada; (yellow card) 90+3' Ziane Cherif	Stadium: Stade Omar Hamadi; Referee: Redouane Necib

22 February 2014 Round 20	USM El Harrach	2–2	MC El Eulma	Algiers
15:00	Abid 11', 26'	Report	56', 68' Derrardja	Stadium: Stade 1er Novembre 1954; Referee: Mehdi Abid Charef

1 March 2014 Round 21	MC Oran	1–1	USM El Harrach	Oran
15:00	Berradja 48'	Report	5' Younès	Stadium: Ahmed Zabana Stadium; Referee: Rafik Achouri

8 March 2014 Round 22	USM El Harrach	1–0	CRB Aïn Fakroun	Algiers
15:00	Boumechra 90+1'	Report		Stadium: Stade 1er Novembre 1954; Referee: Mohamed Sahraoui

25 March 2014 Round 23	JSM Béjaïa	1–2	USM El Harrach	Béjaïa
15:00	Zeghli 90' (pen.)	Report	32' Abid; 39' Younès	Stadium: Stade de l'Unité Maghrébine; Referee: Mohamed Saïdi

22 March 2014 Round 24	USM El Harrach	1–0	CR Belouizdad	Algiers
15:00	Abid 44'	Report		Stadium: Stade 1er Novembre 1954; Referee: Mohamed Bichari

26 April 2014 Round 25	ASO Chlef	0–1	USM El Harrach	Chlef
17:45		Report	41' Boumechra	Stadium: Stade Mohamed Boumezrag; Referee: Abderrezzak Arab

6 May 2014 Round 26	USM El Harrach	1–0	MC Alger	Algiers
17:00	B. Mebarki 51'	Report		Stadium: Stade 1er Novembre 1954; Referee: Farouk Houasnia

10 May 2014 Round 27	JS Kabylie	2–0	USM El Harrach	Tizi Ouzou
17:00	Ebossé Bodjongo 51', 53' (pen.)	Report		Stadium: Stade du 1er Novembre 1954; Attendance: 0 (close doors); Referee: Mohamed Amine Bachir

13 May 2014 Round 28	USM El Harrach	2–2	CA Bordj Bou Arréridj	Algiers
15:00	I. Sylla 19' (pen.); A. Hattabi 65'	Report	11' A. Bendrimia; 90+1' (pen.) M. Mosrati	Stadium: Stade 1er Novembre 1954; Referee: Mohamed Boukhalfa

20 May 2014 Round 29	ES Sétif	0–1	USM El Harrach	Sétif
18:00		Report	50' Mazari	Stadium: Stade 8 Mai 1945; Referee: Mohamed Sahraoui

24 May 2014 Round 30	MO Béjaïa	2–1	USM El Harrach	Béjaïa
17:00	Yettou 30'; F. Rahal 45+5' (pen.)	Report	32' B. Mebarki	Stadium: Stade de l'Unité Maghrébine; Referee: Mohamed Saïdi

== Algerian Cup ==
6 December 2013 Round of 64	USM El Harrach	1–2	RC Arbaâ	Constantine
17:00	Sylla 28'	Repport	Cherfaoui 35'; Belkaroui 116'	Stadium: Stade Mohamed Hamlaoui

== Squad information ==
=== Playing statistics ===
No.	Pos	Nat	Player	Total		Ligue 1		Algerian Cup	
No.	Pos	Nat	Player	Apps	Goals	Apps	Goals	Apps	Goals
Goalkeepers
30	GK	(Algeria) ALG	Azzedine Doukha	23	0	23	0	0	0
1	GK	(Algeria) ALG	Houssam Limane	5	0	5	0	0	0
	GK	(Algeria) ALG	Aiyoub Belabes	2	0	2	0	0	0
Defenders
19	DF	(Algeria) ALG	Iles Ziane Cherif	14	0	14	0	0	0
25	DF	(Algeria) ALG	Samir Belkheir	17	0	17	0	0	0
31	DF	(Algeria) ALG	Arslane Mazari	23	1	23	1	0	0
34	DF	(Algeria) ALG	Hicham Belkaroui	20	2	20	2	0	0
28	DF	(Algeria) ALG	Zine El Abidine Boulekhoua	21	0	21	0	0	0
22	DF	(Algeria) ALG	Ayoub Azzi	26	1	26	1	0	0
	DF	(Algeria) ALG	Ryad Kenniche	1	0	1	0	0	0
	DF	(Algeria) ALG	Sofiane Khadir	6	0	6	0	0	0
	DF	(Algeria) ALG	Djalal Hadjarsi	1	0	1	0	0	0
Midfielders
6	MF	(Algeria) ALG	Hamza Aït Ouamar	28	0	28	0	0	0
8	MF	(Algeria) ALG	Karim Hendou	29	0	29	0	0	0
5	MF	(Algeria) ALG	Sofiane Younes	29	0	29	0	0	0
15	MF	(Madagascar) MAD	Ibrahim Amada	24	0	24	0	0	0
	MF	(Algeria) ALG	Aghiles Fergani	3	0	3	0	0	0
10	MF	(Algeria) ALG	Amine El Amali	9	0	9	0	0	0
16	MF	(Algeria) ALG	Chamseddine Harrag	1	0	1	0	0	0
20	MF	(Algeria) ALG	Mohamed Benaroussi	9	0	9	0	0	0
	MF	(Algeria) ALG	Kamel Allam	4	0	4	0	0	0
99	MF	(Algeria) ALG	El Hadi Guehche	1	0	1	0	0	0
	MF	(Algeria) ALG	Mohamed Ellah Benchikh	1	0	1	0	0	0
Forwards
7	FW	(Algeria) ALG	Ibrahim Bousehaba	3	0	3	0	0	0
11	FW	(Algeria) ALG	Salim Boumechra	26	4	26	4	0	0
14	FW	(Algeria) ALG	Sofiane Hanitser	5	1	5	1	0	0
9	FW	(Guinea) GUI	Ibrahim Khalil Sylla	27	5	27	5	0	0
36	FW	(Algeria) ALG	Lamine Abid	20	7	20	7	0	0
17	FW	(Algeria) ALG	Billel Mebarki	15	2	15	2	0	0
27	FW	(Algeria) ALG	Abdelkader Amer Yahia	5	0	5	0	0	0
	FW	(Algeria) ALG	Sidi Mohamed Benmerah	7	0	7	0	0	0
	FW	(Algeria) ALG	Abdenour Hattabi	3	1	3	1	0	0
Players transferred out during the season

Last updated: 11 October 2017
Source: fr.soccerway.com

== Transfers ==
=== In ===
Date	Pos	Player	From club	Transfer fee	Source
19 June 2013	MF	(Algeria) Kamel Allam	IB Lakhdaria	Undisclosed	
19 June 2013	MF	(Algeria) Mohamed Boukhetala	ES Ben Aknoun	Undisclosed	
21 June 2013	FW	(Algeria) Abdelkader Amer Yahia	ASM Oran	Undisclosed	
26 June 2013	FW	(Algeria) Salim Boumechra	MC Oran	Free transfer	
1 July 2013	DF	(Algeria) Hicham Belkaroui	ASM Oran	7,000,000 DA	
1 July 2013	MF	(Algeria) Chamseddine Harrag	Reserve team	First Professional Contract	
1 July 2013	MF	(Algeria) Yacine Medane	Reserve team	First Professional Contract	
19 July 2013	FW	(Algeria) Ibrahim Bousehaba	WA Tlemcen	Undisclosed	
21 July 2013	DF	(Algeria) Arslane Mazari	MC Oran	Undisclosed	
21 July 2013	FW	(Guinea) Ibrahim Khalil Sylla	Unattached	Free transfer	
31 July 2013	GK	(France) (Algeria) Aiyoub Belabes	(France) US Quevilly	Undisclosed	

=== Out ===
Date	Pos	Player	To club	Transfer fee	Source
14 July 2013	FW	(Algeria) Baghdad Bounedjah	(Tunisia) Étoile du Sahel	€300,000	
1 January 2014	MF	(Algeria) Aghiles Fergani	CA Batna	Undisclosed	
1 January 2014	MF	(Algeria) Kamel Allam	IB Lakhdaria	loan	
10 January 2014	FW	(Algeria) Billel Mebarki	JSM Béjaïa	Undisclosed	
