= 2012–13 USM El Harrach season =

USM El Harrach
2012–13 season
- Chairman: Mohamed Laib
- Head coach: Boualem Charef
- Stadium: Stade 1er Novembre 1954
- Ligue 1: Runners-up
- Algerian Cup: Round of 16
- Top goalscorer: League: Baghdad Bounedjah (10); All: Baghdad Bounedjah (11); Amine El Amalli (11)

In the 2012–13 season, USM El Harrach is competing in the Ligue 1 for the 29th season, as well as the Algerian Cup. They will be competing in Ligue 1, and the Algerian Cup.

== Squad list ==
Players and squad numbers last updated on 18 November 2012.
Note: Flags indicate national team as has been defined under FIFA eligibility rules. Players may hold more than one non-FIFA nationality.

No.	Nat.	Position	Name	Date of birth (age)	Signed from
Goalkeepers
1	(Algeria)	GK	Houssam Limane	18 January 1990 (aged 22)	(Algeria) Youth system
30	(Algeria)	GK	Azzedine Doukha	5 August 1986 (aged 26)	(Algeria) MC Alger
Defenders
19	(Algeria)	CB	Iles Ziane Cherif	7 April 1984 (aged 28)	(Algeria) Olympique de Médéa
17	(Algeria)	CB	Moussa Mekioui	5 February 1982 (aged 30)	(Algeria) CA Bordj Bou Arréridj
5	(Algeria)	RB	Mohamed Yaghni	26 February 1988 (aged 24)	(Algeria) USM Blida
13	(Algeria)	CB	Abdelghani Demmou	29 January 1989 (aged 23)	(Algeria) SA Mohammadia
25	(Algeria)	LB	Samir Belkheir	9 November 1985 (aged 27)	(Algeria) USM Annaba
	(Algeria)	CB	Hicham Belkaroui	24 August 1990 (aged 22)	(Algeria) ASM Oran
28	(Algeria)	RB	Zine El Abidine Boulekhoua	15 April 1990 (aged 22)	(Algeria) USM Aïn Beïda
22	(Algeria)	CB	Ayoub Azzi	14 September 1989 (aged 23)	(Algeria) MC Mekhadma
	(Algeria)	RB	Walid Alati	1 August 1991 (aged 21)	(Algeria) Youth system
Midfielders
6	(Algeria)	DM	Hamza Aït Ouamar	6 December 1986 (aged 26)	(Algeria) CR Belouizdad
	(Algeria)	LM	Abdelmalek Bitam	17 June 1986 (aged 26)	(Algeria) CA Batna
8	(Algeria)	DM	Karim Hendou	27 May 1986 (aged 26)	(Algeria) JS El Biar
5	(Algeria)	LW	Sofiane Younes	25 November 1982 (aged 30)	(Algeria) MC Alger
	(Algeria)	AM	Ismail Tatem	18 July 1991 (aged 21)	(Algeria) USM Alger
99	(Chad)	AM	Yaya Kerim	10 August 1991 (aged 21)	(Algeria) Renaissance
15	(Madagascar)	DM	Ibrahim Amada	28 February 1990 (aged 22)	(Algeria) AS Khroub
	(Algeria)	DM	Abdelhakim Djarbou	21 March 1990 (aged 22)	(Algeria) US Biskra
10	(Algeria)	RW	Amine El Amali	29 April 1988 (aged 24)	(Algeria) ES Mostaganem
	(Algeria)	DM	Chamseddine Harrag	10 August 1992 (aged 20)	(Algeria) Youth system
	(Algeria)	AM	Yacine Medane	28 February 1993 (aged 19)	(Algeria) Youth system
Forwards
14	(Algeria)	CF	Sofiane Hanitser	20 October 1984 (aged 28)	(Algeria) MC Oran
11	(Algeria)	LW	Amine Touahri	12 February 1989 (aged 23)	(Algeria) Youth system
31	(Algeria)	CF	Baghdad Bounedjah	24 November 1991 (aged 21)	(Algeria) RCG Oran
36	(Algeria)	CF	Lamine Abid	4 July 1991 (aged 21)	(Algeria) Youth system

== Competitions ==
=== Overview ===
Competition	Record								Started round	Final position / round	First match	Last match
Competition	G	W	D	L	GF	GA	GD	Win %	Started round	Final position / round	First match	Last match
Ligue 1	30	17	6	7	38	22	+16	56.67	—N/a	Runners-up	15 September 2012	21 May 2013
Algerian Cup	3	2	0	1	5	3	+2	66.67	Round of 64	Round of 16	14 December 2012	5 March 2013
Total	33	19	6	8	43	25	+18	57.58				

Updated to match played 9 May 2017
Source: Competitions

== League table ==
Pos	Team	Pld	W	D	L	GF	GA	GD	Pts	Qualification or relegation
1	ES Sétif (C)	30	18	5	7	55	27	+28	59	Qualification for the Champions League preliminary round
2	USM El Harrach (Note: USM El Harrach, the 2012–13 Algerian Ligue Professionnelle 1 runner-up, withdrew after the draw was held. Sporting Praia Cruz, the 2013 São Tomé and Príncipe Championship champion, were allowed by the CAF to replace them in the draw.)	30	17	6	7	38	22	+16	57	Qualification for the Champions League preliminary round
3	CS Constantine	30	13	13	4	37	20	+17	52	Qualification for the Confederation Cup preliminary round
4	USM Alger (Note: USM Alger, the 2012–13 Algerian Cup winner, withdrew before the start of the competition.)	30	15	6	9	32	15	+17	51	Qualification for the Confederation Cup preliminary round
5	MC Alger (Note: In a match between USM El Harrach and MC Alger the last refused to play in the Stade 1er Novembre 1954, but the LFP refused to change the pitch, Despite the presence of USM El Harrach, the referees and supporters, but the Mouloudia team did not attend. the club will receive a penalty, according to Article 84 of the Disciplinary Code of the Algerian Football Federation (FAF), "a match lost by penalty. Defalcation of three (03) points, One million dinars (1,000,000 dinars) fine for the club. "The offending club will be deprived of its compensation due for television rights.)	30	15	8	7	33	24	+9	50	

Updated to match(es) played on 21 May 2013. Source: DZFoot
Rules for classification: 1) points; 2) head-to-head points; 3) head-to-head goal difference; 4) goal difference; 5) total goals; 6) fairplay ranking; 7) playoff.
(C) Champions

=== Results summary ===
Overall								Home						Away					
Pld	W	D	L	GF	GA	GD	Pts	W	D	L	GF	GA	GD	W	D	L	GF	GA	GD
30	17	6	7	32	23	+9	57	10	4	1	19	6	+13	7	2	6	13	17	−4

Last updated: 29 December 2014.
Source: Competitive matches

=== Results by round ===
Round	1	2	3	4	5	6	7	8	9	10	11	12	13	14	15	16	17	18	19	20	21	22	23	24	25	26	27	28	29	30
Ground	H	A	H	A	H	H	A	H	A	H	A	H	A	H	A	A	H	A	H	A	A	H	A	H	A	H	A	H	A	H
Result	W	W	D	L	W	W	W	D	W	W	L	D	W	W	L	W	W	L	W	W	L	L	D	W	L	D	W	W	D	W
Position	4	3	2	7	2	1	1	2	2	2	2	2	2	2	2	2	2	2	2	2	2	2	2	2	3	3	3	2	2	2

Source: Competitive matches
A = Away; H = Home; W = Win; D = Draw; L = Loss

=== Matches ===
10 September 2012 Round 1	USM El Harrach	1–0	JS Kabylie	Algiers
16:00	El Amali 28'	Report		Stadium: Stade 1er Novembre 1954; Referee: Mehdi Abid Charef

18 September 2012 Round 2	CA Bordj Bou Arréridj	0–1	USM El Harrach	Bordj Bou Arréridj
20:30		Report	39' Kerim	Stadium: Stade 20 Août 1955; Referee: Youssef Zerrouki

22 September 2012 Round 3	USM El Harrach	0–0	ES Sétif	Algiers
16:00		Report		Stadium: Stade 1er Novembre 1954; Referee: Mohamed Bichari

29 September 2012 Round 4	MC El Eulma	2–0	USM El Harrach	El Eulma
18:00	Gharbi 6'; Chenihi 8'	Report		Stadium: Stade Messaoud Zougar; Referee: Mohamed Sahraoui

6 October 2012 Round 5	USM El Harrach	2–0	CA Batna	Algiers
16:00	El Amali 2'; Tatem 14'	Report		Stadium: Stade 1er Novembre 1954; Referee: Mohamed Saïdi

16 October 2012 Round 6	USM El Harrach	2–0	ASO Chlef	Algiers
16:00	Kerim 25'; El Amali 88'	Report		Stadium: Stade 1er Novembre 1954; Referee: Farouk Houasnia

20 October 2012 Round 7	WA Tlemcen	1–2	USM El Harrach	Tlemcen
18:00	Tiouli 7'	Report	19' Bounedjah; 83' El Amali	Stadium: Stade Akid Lotfi; Referee: Boubekeur Zouaoui

23 October 2012 Round 8	USM El Harrach	0–0	USM Alger	Algiers
16:00		Report		Stadium: Stade 1er Novembre 1954; Referee: Sofiane Bousseter

3 November 2012 Round 9	JS Saoura	0–3 (Note: Match was suspended in 67th minute at 1-2 due to riots on the terraces; match awarded 0-3.)	USM El Harrach	Béchar
15:00		Report		Stadium: Stade 20 Août 1955; Referee: Mehdi Abid Charef

10 November 2012 Round 10	USM El Harrach	3–0	MC Oran	Algiers
15:00	Bounedjah 8'; Amada 78'; Lamali 88'	Report		Stadium: Stade 1er Novembre 1954; Referee: Saïd Aouina

17 November 2012 Round 11	JSM Béjaïa	2–0	USM El Harrach	Béjaïa
17:45	Zerara 7'; Niati 59'	Report		Stadium: Stade de l'Unité Maghrébine; Referee: Rafik Achouri

24 November 2012 Round 12	USM El Harrach	1–1	USM Bel-Abbès	Algiers
15:00	Bounedjah 83'	Report	35' Slimane	Stadium: Stade 1er Novembre 1954; Referee: Boubekeur Zouaoui

1 December 2012 Round 13	CR Belouizdad	2–4	USM El Harrach	Blida
15:00	Ammour 90' (pen.), 90+1'	Report	17' Kerim; 18', 88' Bounedjah; 70' El Amali	Stadium: Mustapha Tchaker Stadium; Referee: Farouk Houasnia

8 December 2012 Round 14	USM El Harrach	1–0	CS Constantine	Algiers
15:00	Kerim 23'	Report		Stadium: Stade 1er Novembre 1954; Referee: Mohamed Saïdi

21 December 2012 Round 15	MC Alger	1–0	USM El Harrach	Algiers
16:00	Djallit 52' (pen.)	Report		Stadium: July 5, 1962 Stadium; Referee: Mehdi Abid Charef

15 January 2013 Round 16	JS Kabylie	0–1	USM El Harrach	Tizi Ouzou
15:00		Report	37' Tatem	Stadium: Stade 1er Novembre 1954; Referee: Redouane Necib

19 January 2013 Round 17	USM El Harrach	2–1	CA Bordj Bou Arréridj	Algiers
15:00	Younes 26'; Chebira 68' (o.g.)	Report	90' Mesfar	Stadium: Stade 1er Novembre 1954; Referee: Merzak Halalchi

25 January 2013 Round 18	ES Sétif	1–0	USM El Harrach	Sétif
16:00	Delhoum 90+3'	Report		Stadium: Stade 8 Mai 1945; Referee: Farouk Mial

2 February 2013 Round 19	USM El Harrach	1–0	MC El Eulma	Algiers
15:00	Azzi 88'	Report		Stadium: Stade 1er Novembre 1954; Referee: Said Aouina

9 February 2013 Round 20	CA Batna	2–3	USM El Harrach	Algiers
15:00	El Hadi 26'; Fezzani 43' (pen.)	Report	36', 90+1' Bounedjah; 80' Belkaroui	Stadium: Stade 1er Novembre 1954; Referee: Mohamed Bachir

16 February 2013 Round 21	ASO Chlef	3–0	USM El Harrach	Chlef
18:00	Messaoud 55'; Haddouche 57'; Zaouche 71'	Report		Stadium: Stade Mohamed Boumezrag; Referee: Mehdi Abid Charef

23 February 2013 Round 22	USM El Harrach	1–2	WA Tlemcen	Algiers
15:00	Bounedjah 60' (pen.)	Report	4' Ghazali; 63' Rechrouche	Stadium: Stade 1er Novembre 1954; Referee: Redouane Necib

9 March 2013 Round 23	USM Alger	0–0	USM El Harrach	Algiers
17:45		Report		Stadium: Stade Omar Hamadi; Referee: Mohamed Bichari

19 March 2013 Round 24	USM El Harrach	2–1	JS Saoura	Algiers
18:00	Belkaroui 35'; Belkaroui 65' (pen.)	Report	49' (pen.) Sebie	Stadium: Stade 1er Novembre 1954; Referee: Rafik Achouri

6 April 2013 Round 25	MC Oran	1–0	USM El Harrach	Oran
16:00	Dagoulou 38'	Report		Stadium: Stade Habib Bouakeul; Referee: Mehdi Abid Charef

27 April 2013 Round 26	USM El Harrach	1–1	JSM Béjaïa	Algiers
18:00	Bounedjah 90+3'	Report	45+1' Bangoura	Stadium: Stade 1er Novembre 1954; Referee: Mohamed Bichari

4 May 2013 Round 27	USM Bel-Abbès	1–2	USM El Harrach	Sidi Bel Abbès
17:00	Bounoua 59' (pen.)	Report	12', 82' El Amali	Stadium: Stade 24 Fevrier 1956; Referee: Said Aouina

11 May 2013 Round 28	USM El Harrach	2–0	CR Belouizdad	Algiers
17:00	Amada 25'; Bounedjah 68'	Report		Stadium: Stade 1er Novembre 1954; Referee: Youssef Zerrouki

18 May 2013 Round 29	CS Constantine	0–0	USM El Harrach	Constantine
17:00		Report		Stadium: Stade Mohamed Hamlaoui; Referee: Farouk Mial

21 May 2013 Round 30	USM El Harrach	Match awarded (Note: The matches were not played because MC Alger refused to play in the Stade 1er Novembre 1954, but the LFP refused to change the pitch, Despite the presence of USM El Harrach, the referees and supporters, but the Mouloudia team did not attend. the club will receive a penalty, according to Article 84 of the Disciplinary Code of the Algerian Football Federation (FAF), "a match lost by penalty. Defalcation of three (03) points, One million dinars (1,000,000 dinars) fine for the club. "The offending club will be deprived of its compensation due for television rights.)	MC Alger	Algiers
17:00		Report		Stadium: Stade 1er Novembre 1954; Referee: Mehdi Abid Charef

== Algerian Cup ==
14 December 2012 Round of 64	CRB Bougtob	0–1	USM El Harrach	Saida
15:00		Report	57' (pen.) El Amalli	Stadium: April 13, 1958 Stadium; Referee: Youssef Zerrouki

29 December 2012 Round of 32	USM El Harrach	4–2 (a.e.t.)	MC El Eulma	Algiers
14:00	Bounedjah 2'; Amada 23' (pen.); El Amali 95'; Tatem 118'	Report	6' Chenihi; 90+5' Kadri	Stadium: Stade 1er Novembre 1954; Referee: Mohamed Bichari

5 March 2013 Round of 16	USM El Harrach	0–1	USM Alger	Algiers
16:00		Report	48' Bouchema	Stadium: Stade 5 Juillet 1962; Referee: Mokhtar Amalou

== Squad information ==
=== Playing statistics ===
No.	Pos	Nat	Player	Total		Ligue 1		Algerian Cup	
No.	Pos	Nat	Player	Apps	Goals	Apps	Goals	Apps	Goals
Goalkeepers
30	GK	(Algeria) ALG	Azzedine Doukha	24	0	24	0	0	0
1	GK	(Algeria) ALG	Houssam Limane	5	0	5	0	0	0
Defenders
19	DF	(Algeria) ALG	Iles Ziane Cherif	2	0	2	0	0	0
17	DF	(Algeria) ALG	Moussa Mekioui	22	0	22	0	0	0
5	DF	(Algeria) ALG	Mohamed Yaghni	1	0	1	0	0	0
13	DF	(Algeria) ALG	Abdelghani Demmou	21	0	21	0	0	0
25	DF	(Algeria) ALG	Samir Belkheir	9	0	9	0	0	0
	DF	(Algeria) ALG	Hicham Belkaroui	28	2	28	2	0	0
28	DF	(Algeria) ALG	Zine El Abidine Boulekhoua	23	0	23	0	0	0
22	DF	(Algeria) ALG	Ayoub Azzi	23	1	23	1	0	0
Midfielders
6	MF	(Algeria) ALG	Hamza Aït Ouamar	11	0	11	0	0	0
	MF	(Algeria) ALG	Abdelmalek Bitam	3	0	3	0	0	0
8	MF	(Algeria) ALG	Karim Hendou	22	0	22	0	0	0
5	MF	(Algeria) ALG	Sofiane Younes	25	1	25	1	0	0
	MF	(Algeria) ALG	Ismail Tatem	28	2	28	2	0	0
99	MF	(Chad) CHA	Yaya Kerim	15	4	15	4	0	0
15	MF	(Madagascar) MAD	Ibrahim Amada	24	3	24	3	0	0
	MF	(Algeria) ALG	Abdelhakim Djarbou	9	0	9	0	0	0
10	MF	(Algeria) ALG	Amine El Amali	28	8	28	8	0	0
	MF	(Algeria) ALG	Chamseddine Harrag	3	0	3	0	0	0
	MF	(Algeria) ALG	Yacine Medane	2	0	2	0	0	0
	MF	(Algeria) ALG	Chebahi	1	0	1	0	0	0
	MF	(Algeria) ALG	Walid Alati	1	0	1	0	0	0
Forwards
14	FW	(Algeria) ALG	Sofiane Hanitser	4	0	4	0	0	0
11	FW	(Algeria) ALG	Amine Touahri	19	0	19	0	0	0
31	FW	(Algeria) ALG	Baghdad Bounedjah	28	10	28	10	0	0
36	FW	(Algeria) ALG	Lamine Abid	15	0	15	0	0	0
Players transferred out during the season

Last updated: 29 November 2017
Source: fr.soccerway.com

== Transfers ==
=== In ===
Date	Pos	Player	From club	Transfer fee	Source
1 July 2012	DF	(Algeria) Hicham Belkaroui	ASM Oran	Loan for €70,000	
1 July 2012	DF	(Algeria) Ayoub Azzi	MC Mekhadma	Undisclosed	
1 July 2012	DF	(Algeria) Mohamed Yaghni	USM Blida	Undisclosed	
1 July 2012	FW	(Algeria) Amine El Amali	ES Mostaganem	Undisclosed	
1 July 2012	FW	(Algeria) (France) Fayçal Oudira	CR Belouizdad	Undisclosed	
28 July 2012	MF	(Madagascar) Ibrahim Amada	AS Khroub	Undisclosed	
1 August 2012	MF	(Algeria) Hamza Aït Ouamar	CR Belouizdad	Undisclosed	
1 August 2012	DF	(Algeria) Samir Belkheir	USM Annaba	Undisclosed	
1 August 2012	DF	(Algeria) Moussa Mekioui	CA Bordj Bou Arréridj	Undisclosed	
25 August 2012	MF	(Algeria) Sofiane Younes	MC Alger	Free transfer	
5 January 2013	MF	(Algeria) Abdelmalek Bitam	CA Batna	Undisclosed	
16 January 2013	MF	(Algeria) Billal Sebaihi	CS Constantine	Loan	

=== Out ===
Date	Pos	Player	To club	Transfer fee	Source
3 June 2012	DF	(Algeria) Mohamed Lagraâ	MC Oran	Undisclosed	
1 July 2012	DF	(Algeria) Amar Layati	USM El Harrach	Undisclosed	
1 July 2012	DF	(Algeria) Adel Messaoudi	CR Belouizdad	Undisclosed	
25 July 2012	FW	(Algeria) Mohamed Benyettou	MC Oran	Free transfer	
