= Kamel Belarbi =

Algerian footballer (born 1997)

Personal information
- Full name: Kamel Mohamed Seghir Belarbi
- Date of birth: April 11, 1997 (age 29)
- Place of birth: Algiers, Algeria
- Height: 1.80 m (5 ft 11 in)
- Position: Midfielder

Team information
- Current team: JSM Tiaret
- Number: 18

Youth career
- 2015–2016: USM El Harrach

Senior career*
Years	Team	Apps	(Gls)
2016–2018	USM El Harrach	58	(1)
2018–2022	USM Alger	24	(0)
2022	→ NA Hussein Dey	9	(0)
2022–2024	ASO Chlef	30	(1)
2024–2025	ES Ben Aknoun		
2025–2026	MO Béjaïa	5	(0)
2026–	JSM Tiaret	0	(0)
- * Club domestic league appearances and goals as of 14 September 2026

Kamel Mohamed Seghir Belarbi (Arabic: كمال محمد صغير بلعربي; born April 11, 1997) is an Algerian footballer who plays for JSM Tiaret.

== Club career ==
On 10 September 2017, Belarbi made his senior league debut for USM El Harrach, playing the full 90 minutes against JS Kabylie. On 4 December 2018, he signed for USM Alger.On 30 July 2022, he joined ASO Chlef.In August 2024, he signed for ES Ben Aknoun. On 30 July 2025, he joined MO Béjaïa.

== Career statistics ==
=== Club ===
As of 26 May 2019

Club	Season	League			Cup		Continental		Other		Total	
Club	Season	Division	Apps	Goals	Apps	Goals	Apps	Goals	Apps	Goals	Apps	Goals
USM El Harrach	2016–17	Ligue 1	24	0	3	0	—		—		27	0
USM El Harrach	2017–18	Ligue 1	21	1	0	0	—		—		21	1
USM El Harrach	Total		45	1	3	0	—		—		48	1
USM Alger	2018–19	Ligue 1	8	0	1	0	—		—		9	0
USM Alger	Total		8	0	1	0	—		—		9	0
Career total			0	0	0	0	—		—		0	0

== Honours ==
=== Club ===
USM Alger

- Algerian Ligue Professionnelle 1: 2018–19

ASO Chlef

- Algerian Cup: 2022–23
