= Mohamed Rahem =

Algerian footballer (born 1970)

Personal information
- Date of birth: June 21, 1970 (age 56)
- Place of birth: Algiers, Algeria
- Position: Forward

Youth career
- –: USM El Harrach

Senior career*
Years	Team	Apps	(Gls)
1989–1993	USM El Harrach	–	(–)
1993–1998	Chabab Mohammédia	–	(–)
1998–2001	USM El Harrach	–	(–)
2001–2002	NA Hussein Dey	–	(–)

International career
1989–1993	Algeria	16	(2)
- * Club domestic league appearances and goals

Mohamed Rahem (born June 21, 1970, in Algiers) is an Algerian former international football player who played as a forward. He took part in two Africa Cup of Nations in 1990, when he was champion, and in 1992.

== Honours ==
- Algerian Ligue 1

Runners-up (1) : 1991–92

- Africa Cup of Nations

Champion (1) : 1990
