= Mohamed Coumbassa =

Guinean footballer

Personal information
- Date of birth: 15 March 1995 (age 31)
- Place of birth: Guinea
- Position: Attacking midfielder

Senior career*
Years	Team	Apps	(Gls)
2013–2014	Athlético de Coléah		
2014–2015	Horoya AC		
2015–2017	USM El Harrach	24	(1)
2016–2017	→ NA Hussein Dey (loan)	11	(1)
2017–2018	Al Nasr SC		
2019–2020	Santoba FC		
2021–2024	Horoya AC		
2024–2025	Fursan Hispania		
- * Club domestic league appearances and goals as of 16 April 2018

Mohamed Coumbassa (born 15 March 1995) is a Guinean footballer who plays as a midfielder.
