= Marwane Benamra =

Algerian footballer (born 1995)

Personal information
- Date of birth: 9 April 1995 (age 31)
- Place of birth: Lyon, France
- Height: 1.80 m (5 ft 11 in)
- Position: Forward

Team information
- Current team: Fola Esch
- Number: 11

Youth career
- –2014: Lyon

Senior career*
| Years | Team | Apps | (Gls) |
| 2014–2016 | Évian B | | |
| 2016 | Villefranche | | |
| 2017 | USM El Harrach | 11 | (1) |
| 2017 | CR Belouizdad | | |
| 2017–2018 | Horadada | | |
| 2018–2019 | Mondorf-les-Bains | 19 | (13) |
| 2019–2020 | Virton | 0 | (0) |
| 2020 | → Givry (loan) | | |
| 2020–2022 | Swift Hesperange | 7 | (1) |
| 2022–2024 | Mondorf-les-Bains | 48 | (12) |
| 2025– | Fola Esch | 11 | (1) |
- * Club domestic league appearances and goals as of 26 June 2025

Marwane Benamra (born 9 April 1995) is an Algerian professional footballer who plays for Fola Esch in Luxembourg.
