= Khaled Lounici =

Algerian footballer and manager (born 1967)

Personal information
- Date of birth: 9 July 1967 (age 59)
- Place of birth: Algiers, Algeria
- Position: Forward

Youth career
- 1980–1984: USM El Harrach

Senior career*
Years	Team	Apps	(Gls)
1984–1992	USM El Harrach		
1992–1994	Aydınspor	20	(2)
1994	JS Bordj Ménaïel		
1995	Al-Qadisiyah FC		
1995–1999	USM El Harrach		
1999–2000	USM Alger		
2000–2001	MC Alger		
2001–2003	USM El Harrach		

International career
1991–1999	Algeria	33	(3)

Managerial career
- 2005–2007: USM El Harrach
- 2008–2009: MO Béjaïa
- 2009–2011: Olympique de Médéa
- 2011: USM Annaba
- 2012–?: Paradou AC
- 2015: RC Arbaâ
- 2015: RC Arbaâ
- 2018: MC El Eulma
- 2018: USM Blida
- * Club domestic league appearances and goals

Khaled Lounici (born 9 July 1967) is an Algerian retired professional football player and manager. He spent the majority of his playing career with USM El Harrach.

He represented the Algeria national team in two major tournaments, which were the 1996 African Nations Cup and the 1989 FIFA Futsal World Championship.

In July 2026, Lounici gave an interview in which he discussed the performance of the Algeria national team at the 2026 FIFA World Cup, as well as issues related to the management of the national team and the future of Algerian football. He criticised aspects of the team's preparation and called for improvements in the structure and development of Algerian football.

== Career statistics ==
=== International ===
Appearances and goals by national team and year
National team	Year	Apps	Goals
Algeria	1990	1	0
Algeria	1991	8	1
Algeria	1992	2	0
Algeria	1993	–	
Algeria	1994	3	0
Algeria	1995	4	0
Algeria	1996	8	1
Algeria	1997	6	1
Algeria	1998	–	
Algeria	1999	1	0
Total		33	3

Scores and results list Algeria's goal tally first, score column indicates score after each Lounici goal.

List of international goals scored by Khalid Lounici
No.	Date	Venue	Opponent	Score	Result	Competition
1	3 April 1991	19 May 1956 Stadium, Annaba, Algeria	Morocco	2–0	4–0	Friendly
2	24 January 1996	EPRU Stadium, Port Elizabeth, South Africa	Burkina Faso	1–0	2–1	1996 Africa Cup of Nations
3	12 January 1997	Bourj Hammoud Stadium, Beirut, Lebanon	Lebanon	1–0	2–2	Friendly
