= El Harrach Gare Station =

Station of the Algiers Metro

El Harrach Gare
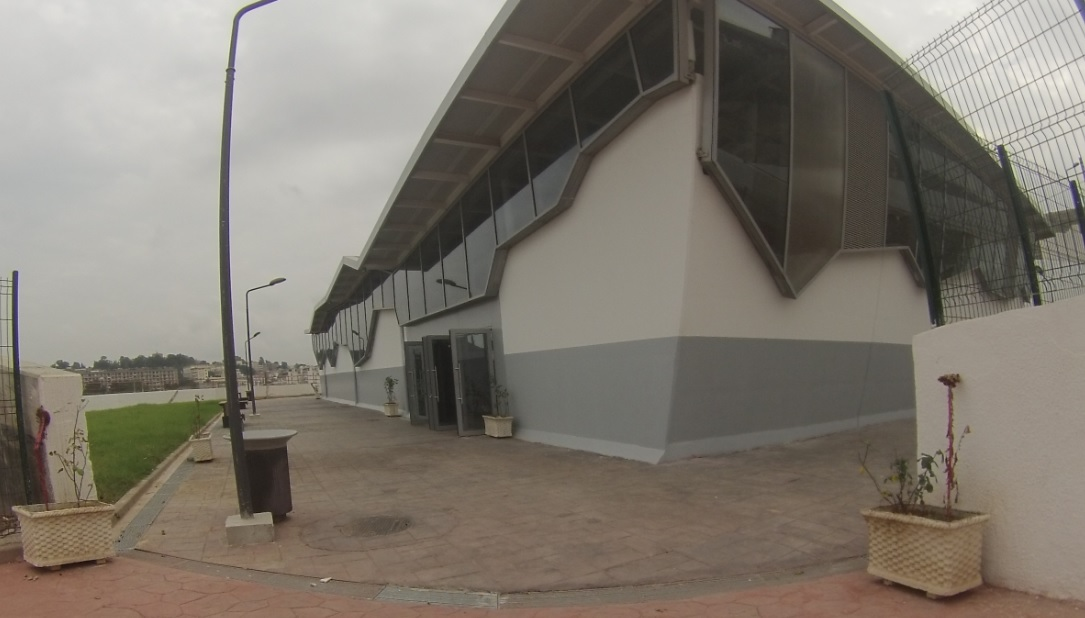

General information
- Location: Bourouba
- Coordinates: 36°43′19″N 3°07′51″E
- Line: Line 1
- Platforms: 2 side platforms at each line
- Tracks: 2 per line
- Connections: Buses, Commuter rail

Construction
- Accessible: yes

History
- Opened: July 5, 2015 (Line 1)

Services
Preceding station	Algiers Metro	Following station
Bachdjarah towards Place des Martyrs	Line 1	El Harrach Centre Terminus
Location

El Harrach Gare is a transfer station serving the Line 1 of the Algiers Metro. It did not open on 4 July 2015 with the rest of the Line 1 extension, and will open in the future.
