= El Harrach District =

Coordinates: 36°42′59″N 3°09′00″E

El Harrach District دائرة الحراش
- District
- Map of Algeria highlighting Algiers Province

- Map of Algiers Province highlighting El Harrach District
- Country: Algeria
- Province: Algiers
- District seat: El Harrach

Population (1998)
  - Total: 237,135
- Time zone: UTC+01 (CET)
- District code: 10
- Municipalities: 4

El Harrach is a district in the northern Algiers Province, Algeria. It was named after its capital, El Harrach.

== Municipalities ==
The district is further divided into 4 municipalities:

- El Harrach
- Oued Smar
- Bourouba
- Bachdjerrah

== See also ==
- Massacre of El Ouffia (6 April 1832)
