= Hafid Derradji =

Algerian sports commentator and former footballer

- حفيظ دراجي
- Born: October 10, 1964 (age 62); Algiers, Algeria
- Education: University of Algiers
- Occupations: sports commentator footballer Journalist and presenter
- Years active: 1989–present
- Known for: Commentator at Télévision Algérienne and beIN SPORTS
- Website: derradjihafid.com

Hafid Derradji (Arabic: حفيظ دراجي; born October 10, 1964) is an Algerian sports commentator and former footballer.

== Biography ==
Derradji studied at the Institute of Information and Communication and graduated in 1988.

He began his career as a journalist on Télévision Algérienne (ENTV GROUP) in 1989 and was for 19 years successively, sports commentator, presenter and producer. During this period, he hosted several shows including La Soirée des rêves and Téléthon. He has won numerous awards and honors in Algeria and abroad, including the 2004 International Olympic Committee Award for Sports and Media and the 2001 award for Best Sports Commentator by the Moroccan newspaper Ahdath. He commented on more than 600 football matches on Télévision Algérienne. He was editor-in-chief of the sports section of ENTV GROUP from 1997 to 2002, Director of Information from 2002 to 2003, and deputy Director General for sports from 2003 to 2006. He was then deputy director from 2006 until he joined Al Jazeera Sports in 2008.

Since 2012, he has worked as a sports commentator at beIN SPORTS in Arabic. He is considered one of the best football commentators in the Arab world.
