= Billel Mebarki =

Algerian footballer (born 1989)

Personal information
- Date of birth: 10 January 1989 (age 37)
- Place of birth: Tissemsilt, Algeria
- Height: 1.74 m (5 ft 9 in)
- Position: Forward

Senior career*
Years	Team	Apps	(Gls)
2010–2012	ASM Oran		
2012–2013	JSM Béjaïa		
2014–2015	USM El Harrach		
2015	MO Béjaïa		
2016–2017	JS Kabylie		
2017–2018	USM El Harrach		
2018	USM Bel Abbes		
2018–2019	ASM Oran		
- * Club domestic league appearances and goals

Billel Mebarki (born 10 January 1989) is a retired Algerian football striker.
