= Billel Benaldjia =

Algerian footballer (born 1988)

Personal information
- Full name: Mohamed Billel Benaldjia
- Date of birth: August 23, 1988 (age 38)
- Place of birth: Algiers, Algeria
- Position: Midfielder

Team information
- Current team: USM Bel-Abbès

Youth career
- –: USM Alger

Senior career*
| Years | Team | Apps | (Gls) |
| 2009–2010 | USM Alger | 19 | (1) |
| 2010–2014 | CR Belouizdad | 72 | (0) |
| 2014–2016 | USM El Harrach | 38 | (0) |
| 2016 | DRB Tadjenanet | 4 | (0) |
| 2017– | USM Bel-Abbès | 1 | (0) |

International career^{‡}
| 2010 | Algeria U23 | 0 | (0) |
- * Club domestic league appearances and goals as of 00:00, 02 April 2017 (UTC) ‡ National team caps and goals as of 05:00, 26 April 2011 (UTC)

Billel Benaldjia (born August 23, 1988) is an Algerian football player who plays as a midfielder for USM Bel-Abbès in the Algerian Ligue Professionnelle 1.
