= Ibrahim Amada =

Malagasy professional footballer

Personal information
- Full name: Ibrahim Samuel Amada
- Date of birth: 28 February 1990 (age 36)
- Place of birth: Antananarivo, Madagascar
- Height: 1.76 m (5 ft 9 in)
- Position: Midfielder

Senior career*
Years	Team	Apps	(Gls)
2005–2011	Academie Ny Antsika		
2011	JS Kabylie	11	(0)
2011–2012	AS Khroub	13	(1)
2012–2015	USM El Harrach	72	(8)
2015–2017	ES Sétif	36	(1)
2017–2019	MC Alger	38	(4)
2019–2020	Al-Khor	22	(3)
2021–2022	Al-Markhiya	0	(0)
2022	Al-Qadsiah	15	(0)
2024	Ratchaburi	8	(0)

International career^{‡}
2008–	Madagascar	47	(4)
- * Club domestic league appearances and goals as of 00:00, 4 May 2024 (EST) ‡ National team caps and goals as of 22:00, 14 November 2024 (UTC)

Ibrahim Samuel Amada (born 28 February 1990) is a Malagasy professional footballer who last played for Ratchaburi and the Madagascar national football team as a midfielder.

== Club career ==
Amada was born in Antananarivo, Madagascar.

On 30 January 2011, Amada went on trial with Algerian club JS Kabylie. A few days later, he signed a one-year contract with the club becoming the first Malagasy player to sign in Algeria. On 4 March 2011, Amada made his official debut for JS Kabylie in a 2010–11 Algerian Cup match against ES Mostaganem playing the entire game as JS Kabylie won 1–0. Amada was released from the club at the end of season, making just 11 league appearances.

On 28 July 2012, Amada signed a three-year contract with USM El Harrach.

On 30 January 2022, Amada joined Saudi Arabian club Al-Qadsiah.

== International career ==
On 11 October 2008, Amada made his debut for the Madagascar national football team in 2010 FIFA World Cup qualifier against Ivory Coast as a substitute in the 74th minute. However, Madagascar went on to lose the game 3–0.

== Career statistics ==
=== International ===
As of matches played on 14 November 2024

Madagascar
Year	Apps	Goals
2008	1	0
2009	2	0
2010	2	0
2017	1	0
2018	6	0
2019	11	1
2020	2	1
2021	8	0
2022	4	1
2023	3	0
2024	7	1
Total	47	4

=== International goals ===
As of matches played 14 November 2024

Scores and results list Madagascar's goal tally first.

No	Date	Venue	Opponent	Score	Result	Competition
1.	7 July 2019	Alexandria Stadium, Alexandria, Egypt	DR Congo	1–0	2–2	2019 Africa Cup of Nations
2.	17 November 2020	Barikadimy Stadium, Toamasina, Madagascar	Ivory Coast	1–1	1–1	2021 Africa Cup of Nations qualification
3.	24 September 2022	Stade El Bachir, Mohammedia, Morocco	Congo	2–2	3–3	Friendly
4.	14 November 2024	Loftus Versfeld Stadium, Pretoria, South Africa	Tunisia	2–2	2–3	2025 Africa Cup of Nations qualification

== Honours ==
Academie Ny Antsika

- THB Champions League: 2008

ES Sétif

- Algerian Ligue Professionnelle 1: 2016–17
- Algerian Super Cup: 2015

JS Kabylie

- Algerian Cup: 2011

MC Alger

- Algerian Ligue Professionnelle 1 Best Foreign Player: 2018–19

Individual

- THB Champions League Best Player: 2008

Award

- Knight Order of Madagascar: 2019
