= USM El Harrach =

Algerian football club

USM El-Harrach
- Full name: Union Sportive de la Médina d'El Harrach
- Nicknames: Bouzenzel, Kawassir
- Founded: February 7, 1935; 91 years ago as (Union Sportive Musulmane Maison Carrée)
- Ground: 1 November 1954 Stadium
- Capacity: 8,000
- Head Coach: Boualem Charef
- League: Ligue 1
- 2025–26: Ligue 2, Group Centre-east, 2nd
Home colours	Away colours	Third colours

Union Sportive de la Médina d'El Harrach (Arabic: الإتحاد الرياضي لمدينة الحراش), known as USM El Harrach or simply USMH for short, is an Algerian football club based in El Harrach, a suburb of Algiers. The club was founded in 1935 as Union Sportive Musulmane Maison-Carréenne and its colours are yellow and black. Their home stadium, 1 November 1954 Stadium, has a capacity of 8,000 spectators. The club is currently playing in the Algerian Ligue 2.

== History ==
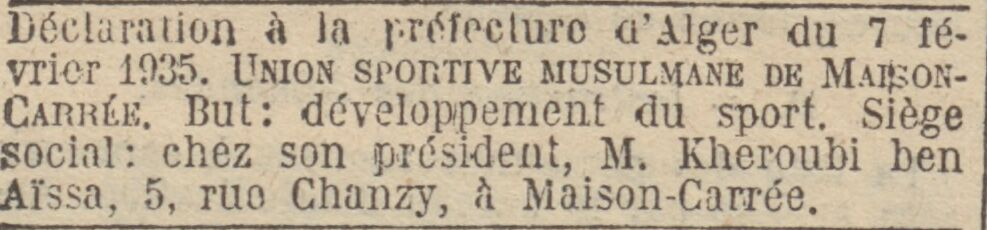
Union sportive musulmane de Maison-Carrée.

In 17th juin 1931, the idea of creating a football club for young Muslims in Maison Carrée was born after what the founder witnessed, it was a bunch of Algerian kids playing football in the street when the French soldiers attacked them with dogs and the incident ended with a serious injuries for the kids. It took the name of Union sportive musulmane de Maison-Carrée (USMMC) and played friendly games until its affiliation on January 23, 1935. Towards the end of 1977, a sports reform took place because it was wanted by the Ministry of Youth and Sports, in order to give elite clubs a good financial basis allowing them to structure themselves professionally (in ASP which means Association sportive de performances). The goal was therefore for them to have total autonomy of management with the creation of their own training center. For this, many clubs had to sacrifice their names and rename them according to the main sponsor. In some club names the letter P of the Sonatrach oil companies sponsoring MC Alger, MC Oran and ES Sétif, renamed MP Alger, MP Oran and EP Sétif. Similarly, Sonelgaz, with the K of Kahraba (gas), sponsored JS Kabylie, which abandoned its name of Jeunesse sportive de Kabylie in Jamiat Sari' Kawkabi, or USM Alger renamed USK Alger. But also the CNAN (Compagnie national algérienne de navigation) with the M of Milaha (meaning navigator) which sponsored the athletic Nasr Hussein Dey which became Milaha Athletic of Hussein Dey and many others. The USMMC will be sponsored by the national mining research and exploitation company (SONAREM) which leads to the change of its name which becomes Union sportive Manadjem El Harrach.

=== Boualem Charef era ===
After seven years in the second division since 2001, USMH is making its return to the elite of Algerian football in controversial conditions, particularly due to the RCK-FAF affair. The club, led since 2007 by the returning Mohamed Laïb, has appointed Boualem Charef as head of its technical bar. After that, the team managed to stay in place while producing beautiful play, notably thanks to the stability of the bench and the team's policy which is based on young players trained or recruited from small Algerian clubs. During this period, the club managed to reach the final of the Algerian Cup in the 2010–11 season, lost to JS Kabylie, and to rank second in the championship for the third time in the 2012–13 season, 2 points behind the winner ES Sétif.

=== New era ===
The Union Sportive de la Médina d’El Harrach is a team that I have always supported, and I am determined to take up this challenge with an ambitious sporting project. I will make my material and moral contribution, and I will spare no effort for the good of the club.

— Sofiane Touahria a statement about his ambitions with the team.

On January 8, 2025, during the inauguration ceremony of the new president of the Union Sportive de la Médina d’El Harrach, several personalities were invited and honored. Among them, sports journalist Hafid Derradji and actor Salah Aougrout, two highly respected figures in their respective fields. Sofiane Touahria was inducted as the new president of the amateur sports club USM El Harrach, this ceremony marked by an important speech by the new president, highlighted the ambitions of the USMH for the coming seasons. For his part, Mustapha Maza, the new sports director, declared that "this day marks the beginning of a new era for the city of El Harrach and its supporters. In a period of transition like this, the ultimate goal is to play for promotion to Ligue 1. In the same context, Maza revealed that the 1 November 1954 Stadium will be completely demolished and rebuilt with a capacity of 25,000 seats to international standards, while a training center will be built on an area of 12,000 square meters.

== Honours ==
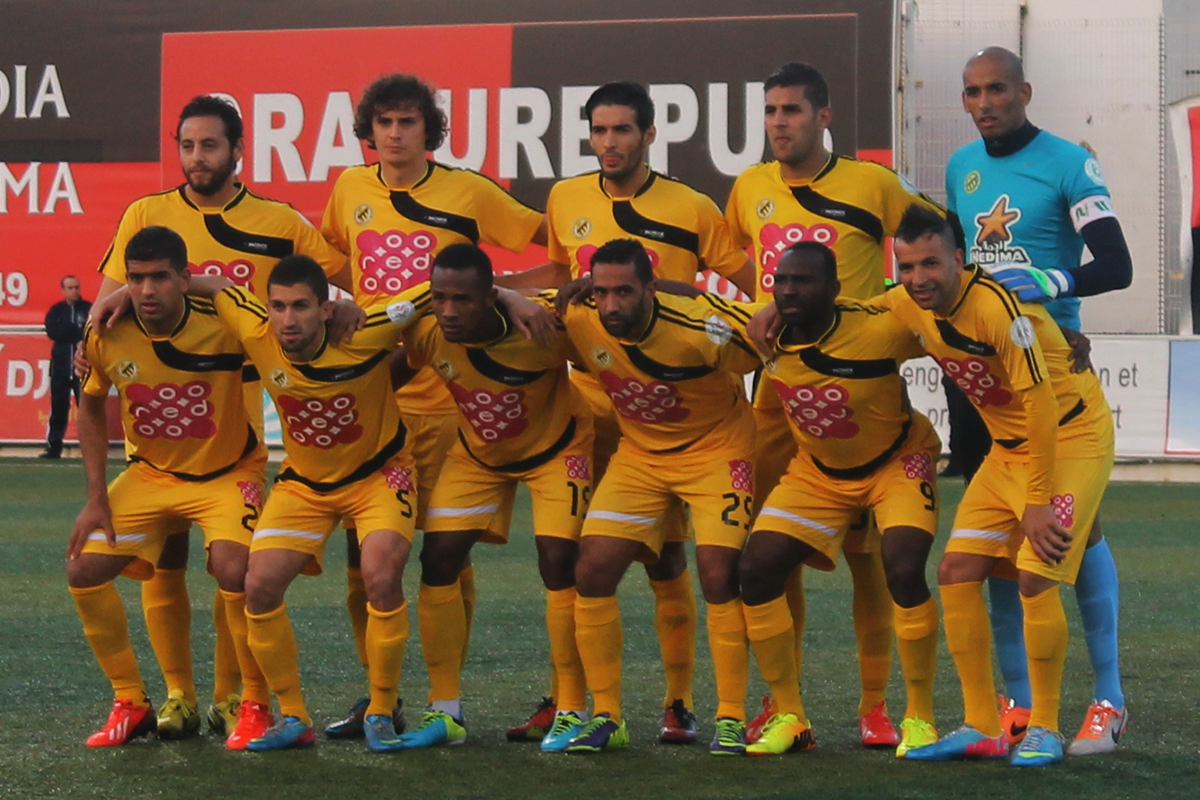
USM El Harrach players lining up before a Ligue 1 match against USM Alger at Omar Hamadi Stadium on February 15, 2014.

=== Domestic competitions ===
- Algerian Ligue Professionnelle 1
  - Champions (1): 1997–98
- Algerian Cup
  - Winners (2): 1973–74, 1986–87

== Managers ==
- (Algeria) Azzedine Aït Djoudi (July 1, 2000 – June 30, 2001)
- (Algeria) Khaled Lounici (2005–07)
- (Algeria) Nacer Bechouche (interim) (Oct 1, 2012 – April 1, 2013)
- (Algeria) Boualem Charef (July 1, 2011 – June 30, 2014)
- (Algeria) Abdelkader Yaïche (July 1, 2014–)

== Notable players ==
Had senior international cap(s) for their respective countries. Players whose name is listed in bold represented their countries while playing for USM El Harrach.

- (Algeria) Lamine Abid
- (Algeria) **Khaled Lounici** ^{6}
- (Algeria) **Merouane Abdouni** ^{7}
- (Madagascar) Ibrahim Amada
- (Algeria) **Azzedine Doukha** ^{8}
- (Algeria) Abdelmoumene Djabou
- (Algeria) Fayçal Badji
- (Algeria) **Hakim Medane** ^{3}
- (Algeria) **Layachi Nouri** ^{2}
- (Algeria) Nacerdine Drid
- (Algeria) **Tarek Ghoul** ^{6}
- (Algeria) **Djamel Jefjef** ^{4}
- (Algeria) Mohamed Benyettou
- (Algeria) Hadj Bouguèche
- (Algeria) Hamid Berguiga
- (Algeria) **Baghdad Bounedjah**
- (Algeria) Salim Boumechra
- (Algeria) Abdelghani Demmou
- (Algeria) Sofiane Hanitser
- (Algeria) Younès Ifticen
- (Algeria) **Karim Hendou**
- (Algeria) Moustapha Zeghba
- (Algeria) Sofiane Younès
- (Algeria) Ali Sami Yachir
- (Algeria) Youcef Saïbi
- (Algeria) Mohamed Tiaïba
- (Algeria) **Mohamed Rahem** ^{1} ^{5}
- (Algeria) Slimane Ould Mata
- (Algeria) **Hicham Belkaroui**
- (Algeria) Farid Chaâl ^{9}

Notes

- Note 1: played at the 1990 African Cup of Nations.
- Note 2: played at the 1988 African Cup of Nations.
- Note 3: played at the 1986 African Cup of Nations.
- Note 4: played at the 1984 African Cup of Nations.
- Note 5: played at the 1992 African Cup of Nations.
- Note 6: played at the 1996 African Cup of Nations.
- Note 7: played at the 2002 African Cup of Nations.
- Note 8: played at the 2013 African Cup of Nations.
- Note 9: played at the 2016 Summer Olympics.

== Statistics ==
=== Recent seasons ===
Season	League									Cup	Other	Africa		Top goalscorer(s) (Note: Goals in all competitions (Algerian Ligue Professionnelle 1, Algerian Cup, League Cup, African and Super Cup) are counted.)		Ref.
Season	Division	Pos	Pts	P	W	D	L	GF	GA	Cup	Other	Africa		Name	Goals	
1962–63	Critérium Honneur	3rd	42	18	10	4	4	48	18	?						
1963–64	Division Honneur	10th	59	30	9	11	10	40	41	R64						
1973–74	National II	2nd								**W**						
1974–75	National II	1st								R16						
1975–76	Nationale I	7th	63	30	12	9	9	39	42	R64						
1976–77	Nationale I	9th	50	26	8	8	10	29	35	R32						
1977–78	Division 1	10th	51	26	9	7	10	23	30	R32						
1978–79	Division 1	5th	53	26	8	11	7	26	25	QF						
1979–80	Division 1	9th	59	30	9	11	10	27	26	R16						
1980–81	Division 1	4th	61	28	13	7	8	33	22	QF						
1981–82	Division 1	4th	62	30	12	8	10	39	20	QF						
1982–83	Division 1	6th	59	30	9	12	9	25	25	SF						
1983–84	Division 1	2nd	65	30	13	9	8	27	25	R32						
1984–85	Division 1	11th	76	38	11	16	11	38	31	R16						
1985–86	Division 1	11th	75	38	14	9	15	43	39	R32				Mohamed El Djazzar	13	
1986–87	Division 1	11th	38	38	12	14	12	41	36	**W**				Mohamed El Djazzar	14	
1987–88	Division 1	5th	35	34	8	19	7	31	25	SF		Cup Winners' Cup	R1	Mohamed El-Djezzar	10	
1988–89	Division 1	9th	29	30	10	9	11	20	28	R16						
1989–90	Division 1	12th	28	30	10	8	12	28	35	NP				Abdennour Baya	6	
1990–91	Division 1	9th	29	30	10	9	11	30	28	R16				Khaled Lounici	13	
1991–92	Division 1	2nd	35	30	12	11	7	29	20	R16	Cnl					
1992–93	Division 1	6th	33	30	12	9	9	29	20	NP				Boutaleb, Rahem	7	
1993–94	Division 1	10th	30	30	9	12	9	23	21	R16						
1994–95	Division 1	12th	29	30	10	9	11	23	33	R32				Nacer Zekri	12	
1995–96	Division 1	7th	43	30	12	7	11	24	26	R64	Grp			Khaled Lounici	7	
1996–97	Division 1	5th	44	30	12	9	9	27	24	R64				Khaled Lounici	10	
1997–98	Division 1	**1st**	25	14	6	7	1	19	9	R16	R16			Dahmani, Benchikha	4	
1998–99	Super Division	9th	33	26	9	6	11	22	25	R64		Champions League	R2	Khaled Lounici	7	
1999–2000	National 1	3rd	47	26	13	8	5	35	22	R32	QF					
2000–01	Super Division	15th	29	30	7	8	15	24	41	R64				Hamid Berguiga	9	
2001–02	Division 1	6th	45	29	13	6	10	39	27	R64						
2002–03	Division 2	3rd	60	28	18	6	4	46	15	R32						
2003–04	Division 2	2nd	65	30	20	5	5	50	18	R64						
2004–05	Division 2	4th	59	34	18	5	11	40	25	R32						
2005–06	Division 2	6th	51	34	14	9	11	47	29	R32						
2006–07	Division 2	10th	43	34	12	7	15	26	32	R4				Rachid Bentaleb	9	
2007–08	Division 2	4th	68	36	19	11	6	49	20	R4						
2008–09	Division 1	11th	40	32	10	10	12	36	40	R64				Youcef Saïbi	9	
2009–10	Division 1	6th	52	34	13	13	8	46	33	R64				Sofiane Hanitser	16	
2010–11	Ligue 1	4th	46	30	12	10	8	36	31	RU				Salim Boumechra	13	
2011–12	Ligue 1	10th	38	30	11	5	14	28	31	SF				Baghdad Bounedjah	7	
2012–13	Ligue 1	2nd	57	30	17	6	7	38	22	R16				Bounedjah, El Amalli	11	
2013–14	Ligue 1	5th	47	30	13	8	9	34	27	R64		Champions League (Note: USM El Harrach, the 2012–13 Algerian Ligue Professionnelle 1 runner-up, withdrew after the draw was held. Sporting Praia Cruz, the 2013 São Tomé and Príncipe Championship champion, were allowed by the CAF to replace them in the draw.)	Withdraw	Lamine Abid	7	
2014–15	Ligue 1	4th	43	30	13	4	13	30	32	R32				Lamine Abid	9	
2015–16	Ligue 1	9th	41	30	10	11	9	28	27	R16				Hadj Bouguèche	8	
2016–17	Ligue 1	13th	36	30	7	15	8	15	21	R16				Dahar, Mellel	4	
2017–18	Ligue 1	15th	28	30	7	7	16	27	37	R32				Hadj Bouguèche	6	
2018–19	Ligue 2	11th	36	30	7	15	8	22	24	R16				Mohamed Reda Boumechra	4	
2019–20	Ligue 2 (Note: On March 15, 2020, the Ministry of Youth and Sports decided to stop the season due to the COVID-19 pandemic in Algeria.)	16th	22	22	5	7	10	20	31	R64				Fayçal Abdat	5	
2020–21	Ligue 2	7th	31	22	8	7	7	19	22	NP						
2021–22	Ligue 2	6th	47	30	14	5	11	34	22	NP						
2022–23	Ligue 2	7th	42	30	11	9	10	37	33	R64						
2023–24	Ligue 2	7th	41	30	12	5	13	35	34	R4						
2024–25	Ligue 2															

Key to league record:

- P = Played
- W = Games won
- D = Games drawn
- L = Games lost
- GF = Goals for
- GA = Goals against
- Pts = Points
- Pos = Final position

Key to divisions:

- 1 = Ligue 1
- 2 = Ligue 2
- 3 = Division 3

Key to rounds:

- DNE = Did not enter
- Cnl = Cancel
- NP = Not played
- PR = Preliminary round
- Grp = Group stage
- R1 = First Round
- R2 = Second Round
- PO = Play-off round
- R64 = Round of 64
- R32 = Round of 32
- R16 = Round of 16
- QF = Quarter-finals
- SF = Semi-finals
- RU = Runners-up
- W = Winners

Champions	Runners-up	Promoted	Relegated

Division shown in bold to indicate a change in division.
Top scorers shown in bold are players who were also top scorers in their division that season.
