= Sofiane Younès =

Algerian footballer (born 1982)

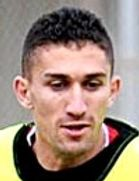

Personal information
- Full name: Sofiane Younès
- Date of birth: November 25, 1982 (age 43)
- Place of birth: El Biar, Algiers, Algeria
- Height: 1.72 m (5 ft 8 in)
- Position: Forward

Senior career*
Years	Team	Apps	(Gls)
2002–2005	USM El Harrach	–	(–)
2005–2009	MC Alger	90	(16)
2009–2010	CR Belouizdad	27	(6)
2010–2011	JS Kabylie	33	(2)
2011–2012	MC Alger	3	(0)
2012–2014	USM El Harrach	56	(7)
2014–2015	ES Sétif	41	(9)
2015–2017	USM El Harrach	45	(8)
2017–2018	Olympique de Médéa	8	(0)
Total		303	(48)

International career^{‡}
2007	Algeria U23	-	(-)
2007–2018	Algeria	2	(0)
- * Club domestic league appearances and goals as of 00:00, 12 December 2011 (UTC) ‡ National team caps and goals as of 00:00, 12 December 2011 (UTC)

Sofiane Younès (Kabyle: Sufyan Yunes; born November 25, 1982) is a former Algerian football player who played as a winger in the Algerian Ligue Professionnelle 1.

== Club career ==
On July 23, 2010, Younès signed a one-year contract with JS Kabylie.

== Honours ==
- Won the Algerian Cup three times:
  - Twice with MC Alger in 2006 and 2007
  - Once with JS Kabylie in 2011
- Won the Algerian Super Cup twice with MC Alger in 2006 and 2007
- Has 2 caps for the Algerian National Team
- Won the CAF Champions League with ES Sétif in 2014.
- Won the CAF Super Cup with ES Sétif in 2015.
- Won the Algerian Ligue Professionnelle 1 with ES Sétif in 2015.
