= 1 November 1954 Stadium (Algiers) =

Football stadium in Algeria

Coordinates: 36°44′04″N 3°07′53″E

1 November Stadium
- Lavigerie
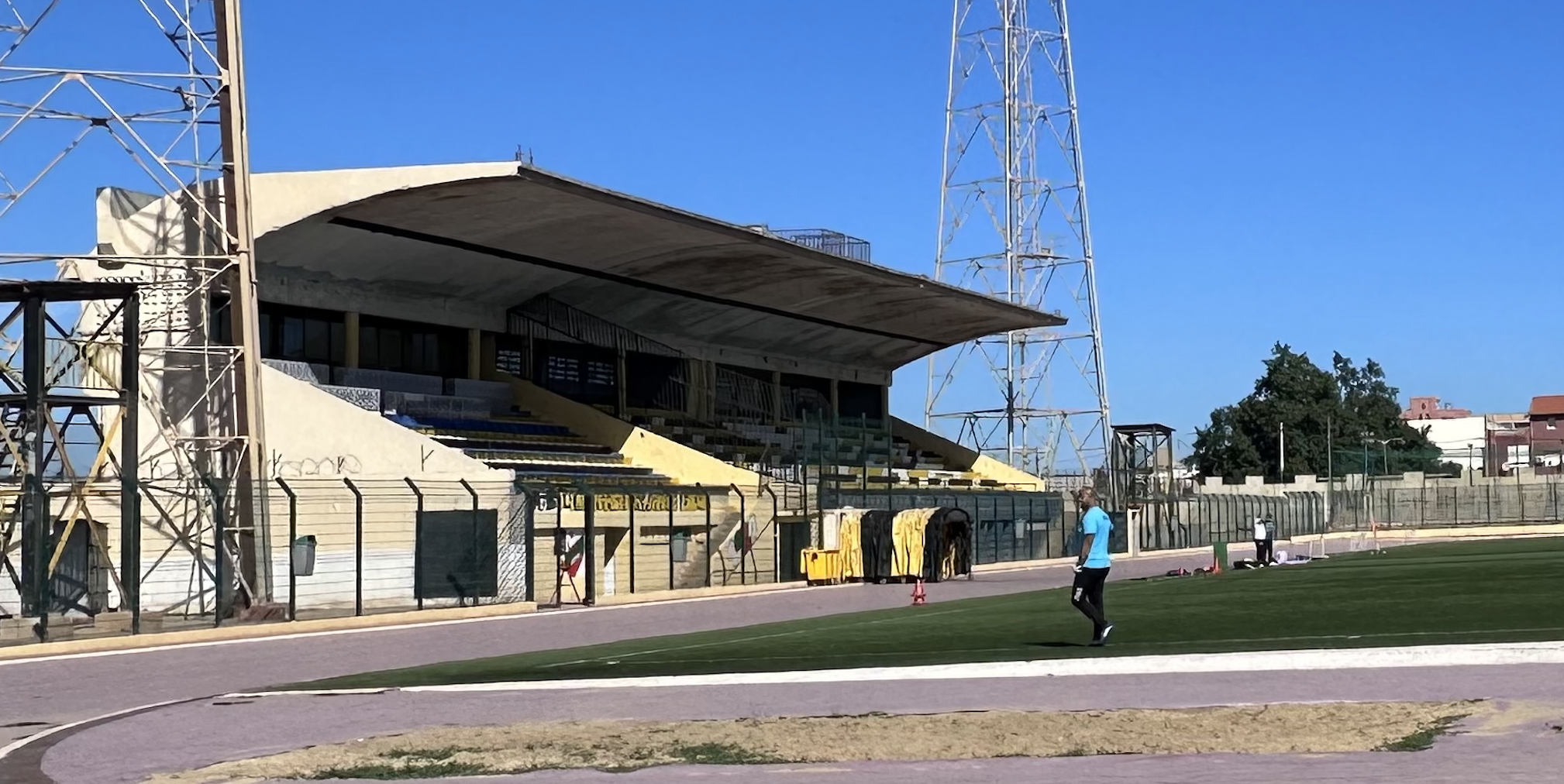
- Interactive map of 1 November Stadium
- Former names: Stade Lavigerie
- Location: Rue Benyoucef Khettab; Algiers, Algeria
- Capacity: 8,000
- Surface: Artificial turf

Tenants
- USM El Harrach

1 November 1954 Stadium (Arabic: ملعب 1 نوفمبر 1954 ; French: Stade du 1er Novembre 1954) is a multi-use stadium in the El Harrach quarter of Algiers, Algeria. It is used mostly for football matches and is the home ground of USM El Harrach. The stadium holds 8,000 people.

The stadium is named for the date of the founding of the National Liberation Front, which obtained independence for Algeria from France.

The stadium was originally known during the French colonial era as Stade Lavigerie, a name that was later replaced after Algerian independence as part of broader efforts to commemorate the start of the Algerian War of Independence on 1 November 1954, a date which is also used in the names of other venues in the country.
