= El Harrach =

El Harrach الـحرّاش ⵍⵃⴻⵔⵔⴰⵛ
- City and Common
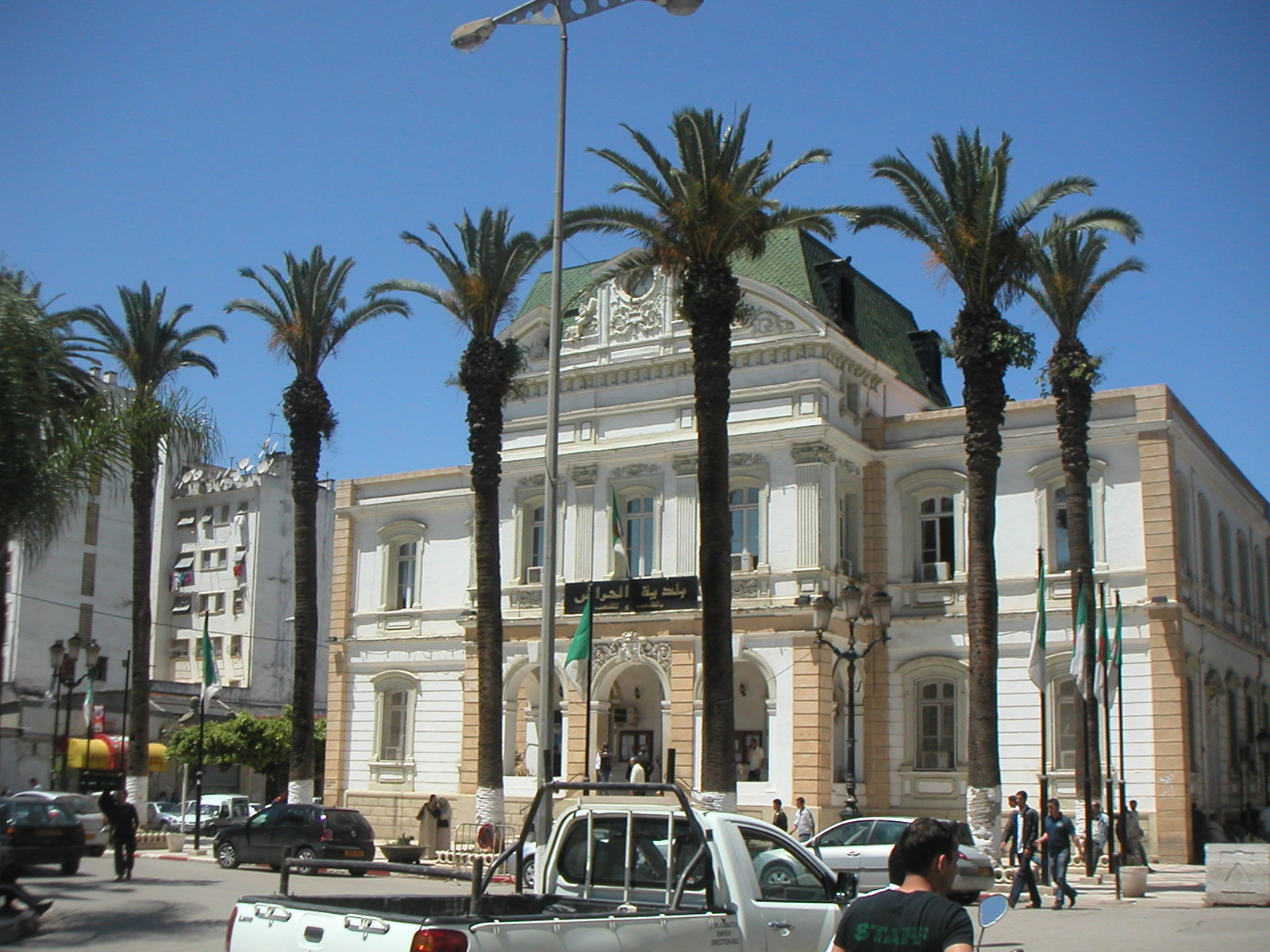
- Town halls of El Harrach
- Motto: "From the people, for the people"
- Location of El Harrach in Algiers Province

- Location of El Harrach in Algeria
- Country: Algeria
- Province: Algiers Province
- District: El Harrach District
- APC: 2012-2017

Government
  - Type: Municipality
  - Mayor: Alik Embarek

Population (2008)
  - Total: 48,869
- Time zone: UTC+1 (CET)
- Postal code: 16200-16131
- ISO 3166 code: CP
- Website: www.apc-elharrach.dz

El Harrach (Berber languages: ⵍⵃⴻⵔⵔⴰⵛ, romanized: Lḥerrac, Arabic: الـحرّاش, romanized: Alḥrrāsh; formerly Maison-Carrée) is a suburb of the Algerian capital Algiers.

The town is home to USM El Harrach football club and the Higher National Veterinary School is located in the area.

== See also ==
- Massacre of El Ouffia (6 April 1832)
