= 2010–11 USM El Harrach season =

USM El Harrach
2010–11 season
- Chairman: Mohamed Laib
- Head coach: Boualem Charef
- Stadium: Stade 1er Novembre 1954
- Ligue 1: 4th
- Algerian Cup: Runners–up
- Top goalscorer: League: Salim Boumechra (11 goal); All: Salim Boumechra (13 goal)

In the 2010–11 season, USM El Harrach is competing in the Ligue 1 for the 27th season, as well as the Algerian Cup. They will be competing in Ligue 1, and the Algerian Cup.

== Squad list ==
Players and squad numbers last updated on 18 November 2010.
Note: Flags indicate national team as has been defined under FIFA eligibility rules. Players may hold more than one non-FIFA nationality.

No.	Nat.	Position	Name	Date of birth (age)	Signed from
Goalkeepers
30	(Algeria)	GK	Azzedine Doukha	5 August 1986 (aged 24)	(Algeria) MC Alger
36	(Algeria)	GK	Miloud Mahfoud	30 November 1985 (aged 25)	(Algeria) MB Sidi Chami
Defenders
28	(Algeria)	CB	Farès Benabderahmane	11 July 1987 (aged 23)	(Algeria) NA Hussein Dey
29	(Algeria)	CB	Adlen Griche	3 March 1979 (aged 31)	(Jordan) Shabab Al-Ordon
22	(Algeria)	CB	Abdelmalek Djeghbala	1 March 1983 (aged 27)	(Algeria) NRB Touggourt
4	(Algeria)	RB	Abdelmalik Aouameur	30 May 1985 (aged 25)	(Algeria) Unknown
13	(Algeria)	LB	Mohamed Zouak	23 October 1981 (aged 29)	(Algeria) RC Arbaâ
26	(Algeria)	LB	Ammar Layati	19 August 1984 (aged 26)	(Algeria) USM Alger
5	(Algeria)	CB	Abdelghani Demmou	29 January 1989 (aged 21)	(Algeria) SA Mohammadia
	(Algeria)	CB	Ishak Guebli	25 April 1987 (aged 23)	(Algeria) JSM Chéraga
	(Algeria)	RM	Braim Ladraâ	21 August 1985 (aged 25)	Unknown
Midfielders
14	(Algeria)		Mohamed Nabil Bellat	29 January 1982 (aged 28)	(Algeria) CR Belouizdad
18	(Algeria)	DM	Messaoud Gharbei	22 September 1983 (aged 27)	Unknown
8	(Algeria)	DM	Karim Hendou	27 May 1986 (aged 24)	(Algeria) JS El Biar
20	(Algeria)		Salim Ryad Kabla	19 November 1989 (aged 21)	(Algeria) Youth system
31	(Algeria)	AM	Mohamed Boualem	28 August 1987 (aged 23)	(Algeria) ASM Oran
23	(Algeria)	AM	Zoheir Benayache	16 December 1990 (aged 20)	(Algeria) Youth system
6	(Algeria)	DM	Mohamed Lagraâ	7 November 1986 (aged 24)	(Algeria) JSM Tiaret
Forwards
7	(Algeria)	RW	Ali Sami Yachir	2 January 1985 (aged 25)	(France) Strasbourg
10	(Algeria)	AM	Salim Boumechra	28 April 1983 (aged 27)	(Algeria) MC Alger
19	(Algeria)	CF	Sofiane Hanitser	20 November 1984 (aged 26)	(Algeria) MC Oran
11	(Algeria)	LW	Amine Touahri	12 February 1989 (aged 21)	(Algeria) Youth system
9	(Algeria)	LW	Mohamed Noureddine Bennai	4 July 1988 (aged 22)	(Algeria) Youth system
17	(Algeria)		Ayoub Latrèche	19 November 1989 (aged 21)	(Algeria) MSP Batna
40	(Algeria)	CF	Sofiane Baouche	5 May 1989 (aged 21)	(Algeria) JSM Tiaret
	(Algeria)		Chawki Chache	15 January 1982 (aged 28)	(Algeria) ASM Oran

== Competitions ==
=== Overview ===
Competition	Record								Started round	Final position / round	First match	Last match
Competition	G	W	D	L	GF	GA	GD	Win %	Started round	Final position / round	First match	Last match
Ligue 1	30	12	10	8	36	31	+5	40.00	—N/a	4th	25 September 2010	8 July 2011
Algerian Cup	6	5	0	1	11	6	+5	83.33	Round of 64	Runners–up	1 January 2011	1 May 2011
Total	36	17	10	9	47	37	+10	47.22				

Updated to match played 9 May 2017
Source: Competitions

== League table ==
Pos	Team	Pld	W	D	L	GF	GA	GD	Pts	Qualification or relegation
2	JSM Béjaïa	30	14	8	8	47	32	+15	50	Qualification for the Champions League preliminary round
3	ES Sétif	30	12	11	7	43	31	+12	47	Qualification for the Confederation Cup preliminary round
4	USM El Harrach	30	12	10	8	36	31	+5	46	
5	CR Belouizdad	30	12	9	9	33	26	+7	45	
6	MC Saïda	30	11	9	10	33	35	−2	42	

Updated to match(es) played on 19 April 2018. Source: DZFoot
Rules for classification: 1) points; 2) head-to-head points; 3) head-to-head goal difference; 4) goal difference; 5) total goals; 6) fairplay ranking; 7) playoff.

=== Results summary ===
Overall								Home						Away					
Pld	W	D	L	GF	GA	GD	Pts	W	D	L	GF	GA	GD	W	D	L	GF	GA	GD
30	12	10	8	34	31	+3	46	9	5	1	24	13	+11	3	5	7	10	18	−8

Last updated: 29 December 2014.
Source: Competitive matches

=== Results by round ===
Round	1	2	3	4	5	6	7	8	9	10	11	12	13	14	15	16	17	18	19	20	21	22	23	24	25	26	27	28	29	30
Ground																														
Result																														
Position																														

Source: Competitive matches
A = Away; H = Home; W = Win; D = Draw; L = Loss

=== Matches ===
Win Draw Loss

25 September 2010 Round 1	USM El Harrach	2–0	CA Bordj Bou Arreridj	Algiers
17:00	Boumechra 21'; Benai 63'	Soccerway report		Stadium: Stade 1er Novembre 1954; Referee: Farouk Mial

1 October 2010 Round 2	ASO Chlef	2–0	USM El Harrach	Chlef
16:00	Soudani 50'; Messaoud 90'	Soccerway report		Stadium: Stade Mohamed Boumezrag; Referee: Mohamed Bouhenni

16 October 2010 Round 3	USM El Harrach	3–0	USM Annaba	Algiers
16:00	Boualem 1'; Benai 57'; Hanitser 90'	Soccerway report		Stadium: Stade 1er Novembre 1954; Referee: Mohamed Benouza

22 October 2010 Round 4	ES Sétif	2–0	USM El Harrach	Sétif
19:00	Djallit 68'; Delhoum 82'	Soccerway report		Stadium: Stade 8 Mai 1945; Referee: Kadda Babrahim

26 October 2010 Round 5	USM El Harrach	0–0	USM Alger	Algiers
16:00		Soccerway report		Stadium: Stade du 1er-Novembre-1954; Referee: Mehdi Abid Charef

29 October 2010 Round 6	WA Tlemcen	2–2	USM El Harrach	Tlemcen
19:00	Boulahia 28'; Belgherri 60' (pen.)	Soccerway report	Hanitser 4'; Boualem 74'	Stadium: Stade Akid Lotfi; Referee: Redouane Necib

6 November 2010 Round 7	USM El Harrach	3–3	JSM Béjaïa	Algiers
14:30	Boumechra 3', 42'; Kabla 85'	Soccerway report	Maroci 22'; N'Djeng 38' (pen.), 63'	Stadium: Stade 1er Novembre 1954; Referee: Farouk Houasnia

13 November 2010 Round 8	USM El Harrach	1–0	JS Kabylie	Algiers
14:30	Boualem 23'	Soccerway report		Stadium: Stade 1er Novembre 1954; Referee: Farid Bahloul

26 November 2010 Round 9	MC Saïda	1–1	USM El Harrach	Saida
15:00	Hendou 44' (o.g.)	Soccerway report	Yachir 62'	Stadium: April 13, 1958 Stadium; Referee: Boubekeur Zouaoui

3 December 2010 Round 10	USM El Harrach	2–0	USM Blida	Algiers
14:00	Boualem 5'; Benabderahmane 75'	Soccerway report		Stadium: Stade 1er Novembre 1954; Referee: Farouk Mial

11 December 2010 Round 11	CR Belouizdad	0–1	USM El Harrach	Belouizdad
14:30		Soccerway report	Boumechra 5' (pen.)	Stadium: Stade 20 Août 1955; Referee: Sofiane Bousseter

15 February 2011 Round 12	USM El Harrach	1–0	MC Alger	Algiers
14:30	Boumechra 70'	Soccerway report		Stadium: Stade 1er Novembre 1954; Referee: Mokhtar Amalou

24 December 2010 Round 13	AS Khroub	1–0	USM El Harrach	El Khroub
15:00	Ngomo 49'	Soccerway report		Stadium: Stade Abed Hamdani; Referee: Mohamed Benouza

19 February 2011 Round 14	USM El Harrach	3–3	MC Oran	Algiers
14:30	Boumechra 13' (pen.); Yachir 67'; Benabderahmane 86'	Soccerway report	Chérif 62'; Berradja 68' (pen.), 90' (pen.)	Stadium: Stade 1er Novembre 1954; Referee: Boubekeur Zouaoui

26 February 2011 Round 15	MC El Eulma	3–0	USM El Harrach	El Eulma
14:30	Boulemdaïs 50', 68', 78' (pen.)	Soccerway report		Stadium: Stade Messaoud Zougar; Referee: Mohamed Benouza

19 March 2011 Round 16	CA Bordj Bou Arreridj	0–3	USM El Harrach	Bordj Bou Arréridj
18:00		Soccerway report	Yachir 10'	Stadium: Stade 20 Août 1955

29 March 2011 Round 17	USM El Harrach	1–3	ASO Chlef	Algiers
15:30	Boualem 53'	Soccerway report	Soudani 20'; Abdeslam 29'; Messaoud 72'	Stadium: Stade 1er Novembre 1954; Referee: Mehdi Abid Charef

2 April 2011 Round 18	USM Annaba	2–1	USM El Harrach	Annaba
15:30	Bouaïcha 85', 90+5'	Soccerway report	Boumechra 56' (pen.)	Stadium: Stade 19 Mai 1956; Referee: Djamel Haimoudi

13 April 2011 Round 19	USM El Harrach	2–1	ES Sétif	Algiers
17:00	Boumechra 52' (pen.); Touahri 74'	Soccerway report	Diss 42'	Stadium: Stade 1er Novembre 1954; Referee: Farouk Houasnia

25 April 2011 Round 20	USM Alger	0–0	USM El Harrach	Bologhine
18:00		Soccerway report		Stadium: Omar Hamadi Stadium; Referee: Mohamed Bouhenni

7 May 2011 Round 21	USM El Harrach	1–0	WA Tlemcen	Algiers
17:00	Yachir 30'	Soccerway report		Stadium: Stade 1er Novembre 1954; Referee: Rafik Achouri

13 May 2011 Round 22	JSM Béjaïa	0–2	USM El Harrach	Béjaïa
20:00		Soccerway report	Boualem 25'; Boumechra 85'	Stadium: Stade de l'Unité Maghrébine; Referee: Sofiane Bousseter

21 May 2011 Round 23	JS Kabylie	1–0	USM El Harrach	Tizi Ouzou
17:00	Hamiti 26'	Soccerway report		Stadium: Stade 1er Novembre 1954; Referee: Mokhtar Amalou

28 May 2011 Round 24	USM El Harrach	2–1	MC Saïda	Algiers
17:00	Bekhtaoui 4' (o.g.); Boumechra 27'	Soccerway report	Benabderahmane 32' (o.g.)	Stadium: Stade 1er Novembre 1954; Referee: Farouk Mial

31 May 2011 Round 25	USM Blida	0–0	USM El Harrach	Blida
16:00		Soccerway report		Stadium: Stade Mustapha Tchaker; Referee: Mohamed Benouza

21 June 2011 Round 26	USM El Harrach	1–0	CR Belouizdad	Algiers
18:00	Boumechra 41' (pen.)	Soccerway report		Stadium: Stade 1er Novembre 1954; Referee: Mohamed Bichari

25 June 2011 Round 27	MC Alger	2–0	USM El Harrach	Bologhine
18:00	Besseghir 10'; Mokdad 70'	Soccerway report		Stadium: Omar Hammadi Stadium; Referee: Djamel Haimoudi

28 June 2011 Round 28	USM El Harrach	1–1	AS Khroub	Algiers
18:00	Griche 90+4'	Soccerway report	Ngomo 1'	Stadium: Stade 1er Novembre 1954; Referee: Youssef Zerrouki

1 July 2011 Round 29	MC Oran	2–2	USM El Harrach	Oran
18:00	Belaïli 8'; Kechamli 90+1'	Soccerway report	Boualem 4', 24' (pen.)	Stadium: Ahmed Zabana Stadium; Referee: Farid Bahloul

8 July 2011 Round 30	USM El Harrach	1–1	MC El Eulma	Algiers
18:00	Layati 45+4'	Soccerway report	Djillali 1'	Stadium: Stade 1er Novembre 1954; Referee: Mohamed Sahraoui

== Algerian Cup ==
1 January 2011 Round of 64	USM El Harrach	4–1	CS Sig	Algiers
14:00	Latreche 16'; Touahri 47'; Boumechra 60'; Kabla 82'	Report	T. Benkada 87'	Stadium: Stade 1er Novembre 1954
Note: Lineup for USM El Harrach - Limane - Djeghbala, Benabderahmane, Griche, Legraa - Gharbi, Bellat, Boualem (Kabla 45’) - Boumechra (Benayache 62’), Touahri (Yachir 70’), Latrèche.

4 March 2011 Round of 32	USM El Harrach	2–1	NARB Réghaïa	Algiers
15:00	Baouche 62'; Lagraâ 94'	Report	Noubli 13'	Stadium: Stade 1er Novembre 1954
Note: Lineup for USM El Harrach - Doukha - Aouameur (Hendou 46’), Benabderahmane, Guebli, Layati (Legraâ 76’) - Bellat, Gharbi, Boualem - Boumechra, Baouche (Chache 67’), Ledraâ.

15 March 2011 Round of 16	MO Béjaïa	0–1	USM El Harrach	Béjaïa
14:30		Report	Boualem 90'	Stadium: Maghrebi Unity Stadium
Note: Lineup for USM El Harrach - Doukha - Djeghbala, Griche, Benabderrahmane, Layati - Gharbi, Legraâ, Boualem - Boumechra, Ledraâ (Touahri 70’), Yachir.

8 April 2011 Quarter-finals	USM El Harrach	1–0	MC Saïda	Algiers
15:30	Bendahmane 90' (o.g.)	Report		Stadium: Stade 1er Novembre 1954; Referee: Bahloul, Bougherara, Zid
Note: Lineup for USM El Harrach - Doukha - Djeghbala, Griche, Benabderahmane, Layati (Legraâ 75’) - Gherbi, Hendou (Bellat 31’), Boualem (Chache 88’) - Boumechra, Ledraâ, Guebli.

18 April 2011 Semi-finals	USM El Harrach	3–2	ES Sétif	Algiers
15:30	Boumechra 26', 70' (pen.); Boualem 87'	Report	Diss 13'; Traoré 43'	Stadium: Stade 1er Novembre; Referee: Mokhtar Amalou
Note: Lineup for USM El Harrach - Doukha - Djeghbala, Demmou, Benabderahmane, Legraâ - Gharbi (Layati 80’), Hendou, Boualem - Boumechra, Ledrâa (Touahri 56’), Yachir (Latrèche 71’).

1 May 2011 Final	USM El Harrach	0–1	JS Kabylie	Algiers
16:00		Report	Hamiti 12'	Stadium: Stade 5 Juillet 1962; Referee: Mehdi Abid Charef
Note: Lineup for USM El Harrach - Doukha - Djeghbala, Demmou, Griche (Benabderahmane 46’), Legraâ - Gherbi, Hendou, Boualem - Yachir (Chache 68’), Ledraâ (Touahri 46’), Boumechra.

== Squad information ==
=== Playing statistics ===
No.	Pos	Nat	Player	Total		Ligue 1		Algerian Cup	
No.	Pos	Nat	Player	Apps	Goals	Apps	Goals	Apps	Goals
Goalkeepers
30	GK	(Algeria) ALG	Azzedine Doukha	28	0	24	0	4	0
36	GK	(Algeria) ALG	Miloud Mahfoud	7	0	6	0	1	0
	GK	(Algeria) ALG	Houssam Limane	1	0	0	0	1	0
Defenders
28	DF	(Algeria) ALG	Farès Benabderahmane	25	2	19	2	6	0
29	DF	(Algeria) ALG	Adlen Griche	21	1	18	1	3	0
22	DF	(Algeria) ALG	Abdelmalek Djeghbala	27	0	22	0	5	0
4	DF	(Algeria) ALG	Abdelmalik Aouameur	14	0	13	0	1	0
13	DF	(Algeria) ALG	Mohamed Zouak	4	0	4	0	0	0
26	DF	(Algeria) ALG	Ammar Layati	18	1	14	1	4	0
5	DF	(Algeria) ALG	Abdelghani Demmou	23	0	20	0	3	0
	DF	(Algeria) ALG	Sid Ali Baâbou	1	0	1	0	0	0
	DF	(Algeria) ALG	Ishak Guebli	3	0	2	0	1	0
	DF	(Algeria) ALG	Braim Ladraâ	14	0	9	0	5	0
Midfielders
14	MF	(Algeria) ALG	Mohamed Nabil Bellat	8	0	6	0	2	0
18	MF	(Algeria) ALG	Messaoud Gharbei	33	0	27	0	6	0
8	MF	(Algeria) ALG	Karim Hendou	34	0	30	0	4	0
20	MF	(Algeria) ALG	Salim Ryad Kabla	17	2	16	1	1	1
31	MF	(Algeria) ALG	Mohamed Boualem	34	10	28	8	6	2
23	MF	(Algeria) ALG	Zoheir Benayache	13	0	12	0	1	0
6	MF	(Algeria) ALG	Mohamed Lagraâ	34	1	28	0	6	1
Forwards
7	FW	(Algeria) ALG	Ali Sami Yachir	30	4	25	4	5	0
10	FW	(Algeria) ALG	Salim Boumechra	33	14	27	11	6	3
19	FW	(Algeria) ALG	Sofiane Hanitser	5	2	5	2	0	0
11	FW	(Algeria) ALG	Amine Touahri	25	2	21	1	4	1
9	FW	(Algeria) ALG	Mohamed Noureddine Bennai	6	2	6	2	0	0
17	FW	(Algeria) ALG	Ayoub Latrèche	12	1	9	0	3	1
40	FW	(Algeria) ALG	Sofiane Baouche	9	1	7	0	2	1
	FW	(Algeria) ALG	Chawki Chache	10	0	8	0	2	0
Players transferred out during the season

Last updated: 29 November 2017

=== Goalscorers ===
Includes all competitive matches. The list is sorted alphabetically by surname when total goals are equal.

No.	Nat.	Player	Pos.	L 1	AC	TOTAL
10	(Algeria)	Salim Boumechra	FW	11	3	14
31	(Algeria)	Mohamed Boualem	MF	8	2	10
7	(Algeria)	Ali Sami Yachir	FW	4	0	4
28	(Algeria)	Farès Benabderahmane	DF	2	0	2
20	(Algeria)	Salim Ryad Kabla	MF	1	1	2
19	(Algeria)	Sofiane Hanitser	FW	2	0	2
11	(Algeria)	Amine Touahri	FW	1	1	2
9	(Algeria)	Mohamed Noureddine Bennai	FW	2	0	2
29	(Algeria)	Adlen Griche	DF	1	0	1
26	(Algeria)	Ammar Layati	DF	1	0	1
6	(Algeria)	Mohamed Lagraâ		0	1	1
17	(Algeria)	Ayoub Latrèche	FW	0	1	1
40	(Algeria)	Sofiane Baouche	FW	0	1	1
Own Goals				0	0	0
Totals				36	11	47

== Transfers ==
=== In ===
Date	Pos	Player	From club	Transfer fee	Source
8 June 2010	MF	(Algeria) Tarek Hammoum	USM Alger	Free transfer	
30 June 2010	DF	(Algeria) Adlen Griche	(Jordan) Shabab Al-Ordon	Loan Return	
1 July 2010	DF	(Algeria) Ishak Guebli	JSM Chéraga	Undisclosed	
1 July 2010	DF	(Algeria) Abdelghani Demmou	SA Mohammadia	Undisclosed	
1 July 2010	MF	(Algeria) Mohamed Lagraâ	JSM Tiaret	Undisclosed	
1 July 2010	FW	(Algeria) Salim Boumechra	MC Alger	Undisclosed	
1 July 2010	FW	(Algeria) Ayoub Latrèche	MSP Batna	Undisclosed	
1 July 2010	FW	(Algeria) Sofiane Baouche	JSM Tiaret	Undisclosed	
1 January 2011	FW	(Algeria) Chawki Chache	ASM Oran	Undisclosed	
1 January 2011	DF	(Algeria) Ammar Layati	USM Alger	Undisclosed	

=== Out ===
Date	Pos	Player	To club	Transfer fee	Source
1 July 2010	DF	(Algeria) Sid Ahmed Fayçal Briki	MC Oran	Free transfer	
1 July 2010	MF	(Algeria) Abbas Aïssaoui	MC Oran	Free transfer	
1 July 2010	MF	(Algeria) Abdelmalek Bitam	USM Blida	Undisclosed	
1 July 2010	DF	(Algeria) Ouissem Mokrane	USM Annaba	Free transfer	
1 July 2010	GK	(Algeria) Abderrahmane Boutrig	MC El Eulma	Free transfer	
11 July 2010	MF	(Algeria) Billel Naïli	JS Kabylie	Free transfer	
1 January 2011	FW	(Algeria) Samir Bentayeb	USM Blida	Undisclosed	
