= 2010–11 ES Sétif season =

ES Sétif
2010–11 season
- President: Abdelhakim Serrar
- Head Coach: Giovanni Solinas (until 22 December 2010); Said Hadj Mansour (from 8 January 2011)
- Stadium: Stade 8 Mai 1945
- Ligue 1: 3rd
- Algerian Cup: Semi-final
- Champions League: Group stage
- Top goalscorer: League: Nabil Hemani (8); All: Nabil Hemani (10)
Home colours	Away colours

The 2010–11 season was ES Sétif's 41st season in the Algerian top flight, newly renamed to the Algerian Ligue Professionnelle 1 as well as the 2010 CAF Champions League and the Algerian Cup.

== Squad list ==
Players and squad numbers last updated on 18 November 2010.
Note: Flags indicate national team as has been defined under FIFA eligibility rules. Players may hold more than one non-FIFA nationality.

No.	Nat.	Position	Name	Date of Birth (Age)	Signed from
Goalkeepers
28	(Algeria)	GK	Mohamed Benhamou	17 December 1979 (aged 31)	Unattached
	(Algeria)	GK	Mohamed Seghir Ferradji	22 August 1975 (aged 35)	(Algeria) OMR El Annasser
1	(Algeria)	GK	Faouzi Chaouchi	5 December 1984 (aged 26)	(Algeria) JS Kabylie
12	(Algeria)		Boualem Benmalek	30 January 1989 (aged 21)	(Algeria) Youth system
Defenders
27	(Algeria)	RB	Abderahmane Hachoud	2 July 1988 (aged 22)	(Algeria) CA Bordj Bou Arreridj
5	(Algeria)	CB	Smaïl Diss	2 December 1976 (aged 34)	(Algeria) USM Blida
3	(Algeria)	LB	Riad Benchadi	7 November 1978 (aged 32)	(Algeria) CA Bordj Bou Arreridj
17	(Algeria)	RB	Slimane Raho	20 October 1975 (aged 35)	(Algeria) JS Kabylie
22	(Algeria)	CB	Mohamed Yekhlef	12 July 1981 (aged 29)	(Algeria) WA Tlemcen
11	(Algeria)	LB	Mokhtar Benmoussa	11 August 1986 (aged 24)	(Algeria) WA Tlemcen
	(Algeria)		Abderrahmane Belkadi	6 June 1992 (aged 18)	(Algeria) Youth system
4	(Algeria)	CB	Abdelkader Laïfaoui	9 July 1981 (aged 29)	(Algeria) CR Belouizdad
2	(Algeria)	CB	Adel Lakhdari	12 August 1989 (aged 21)	(Algeria) US Biskra
	(Algeria)	CB	Said Arroussi	23 July 1991 (aged 19)	(Algeria) Youth system
Midfielders
15	(Algeria)	AM	Bouazza Feham	11 April 1986 (aged 24)	(Algeria) MC Oran
13	(Algeria)	DM	Mourad Delhoum	10 February 1985 (aged 25)	(Algeria) A Bou Saâda
10	(Algeria)	AM	Lazhar Hadj Aïssa	23 March 1984 (aged 26)	(Algeria) MSP Batna
6	(Algeria)	DM	Farouk Belkaid	14 November 1977 (aged 33)	(Algeria) MC Alger
8	(Algeria)	DM	Khaled Lemmouchia	6 December 1981 (aged 29)	(France) Lyon Duchère
30	(Algeria)	RW	Abdelmoumene Djabou	31 January 1987 (aged 23)	(Algeria) USM El Harrach
9	(Algeria)	DM	Antar Boucherit	18 December 1983 (aged 27)	(Algeria) USM Annaba
7	(France)	LM	Sofiene Zaaboub	23 January 1983 (aged 27)	(England) Southend United
23	(Algeria)	DM	Hocine Metref	1 January 1984 (aged 27)	(France) Dijon FCO
24	(Cameroon)	CF	Francis Ambane	8 November 1984 (aged 26)	(Cameroon) Canon Yaoundé
	(Algeria)	AM	Sid Ali Lamri	3 April 1991 (aged 19)	(Algeria) Youth system
	(Algeria)	AM	Akram Djahnit	3 April 1991 (aged 19)	(Algeria) Youth system
	(Algeria)	DM	Mehdi Kacem	8 August 1986 (aged 24)	(France) FC Gueugnon
Forwards
19	(Algeria)	CF	Nabil Hemani	1 September 1979 (aged 31)	(Algeria) JS Kabylie
20	(Algeria)	CF	Hamid Berguiga	25 April 1974 (aged 36)	(Brunei) DPMM FC
	(Algeria)	FW	Abdelmadjid Tahraoui	24 February 1981 (aged 29)	(Libya) Asswehly SC
16	(Algeria)	CF	Moustapha Djallit	21 September 1983 (aged 27)	(Algeria) WA Tlemcen
26	(Algeria)	CF	Youcef Ghazali	24 January 1988 (aged 22)	(Algeria) CR Belouizdad
	(Burkina Faso)	CF	Koh Traoré	29 August 1989 (aged 21)	Unattached
	(Algeria)	LW	Ilyes Kourbia	9 November 1992 (aged 18)	(Algeria) Youth system

== Competitions ==
=== Overview ===
Competition	Record								Started round	Final position / round	First match	Last match
Competition	G	W	D	L	GF	GA	GD	Win %	Started round	Final position / round	First match	Last match
Ligue 1	30	12	11	7	43	31	+12	40.00	—N/a	3rd	25 September 2010	8 July 2011
Algerian Cup	5	4	0	1	9	4	+5	80.00	Round of 64	Semi-final	29 December 2010	18 April 2011
Champions League	6	1	3	2	7	6	+1	16.67	Group stage		16 July 2010	18 September 2010
Total	41	17	14	10	59	41	+18	41.46				

Updated to match played 3 June 2019
Source: Competitions

=== Ligue 1 ===
==== League table ====
Pos	Team	Pld	W	D	L	GF	GA	GD	Pts	Qualification or relegation
1	ASO Chlef (C)	30	19	6	5	51	20	+31	63	Qualification for the Champions League preliminary round
2	JSM Béjaïa	30	14	8	8	47	32	+15	50	Qualification for the Champions League preliminary round
3	ES Sétif	30	12	11	7	43	31	+12	47	Qualification for the Confederation Cup preliminary round
4	USM El Harrach	30	12	10	8	36	31	+5	46	
5	CR Belouizdad	30	12	9	9	33	26	+7	45	

Updated to match(es) played on 19 April 2018. Source: DZFoot
Rules for classification: 1) points; 2) head-to-head points; 3) head-to-head goal difference; 4) goal difference; 5) total goals; 6) fairplay ranking; 7) playoff.
(C) Champions

==== Results summary ====
Overall								Home						Away					
Pld	W	D	L	GF	GA	GD	Pts	W	D	L	GF	GA	GD	W	D	L	GF	GA	GD
30	12	11	7	43	31	+12	47	9	5	1	28	12	+16	3	6	6	15	19	−4

Last updated: 22 April 2018.
Source: Competitive matches

==== Results by round ====
Round	1	2	3	4	5	6	7	8	9	10	11	12	13	14	15	16	17	18	19	20	21	22	23	24	25	26	27	28	29	30
Ground	A	H	A	H	A	H	A	H	A	H	A	H	A	H	A	H	A	H	A	H	A	H	A	H	A	H	A	H	A	H
Result	W	W	L	W	W	W	W	D	D	D	D	W	L	W	D	W	D	L	L	D	D	W	D	D	L	W	L	D	L	W
Position	6	1	6	3	2	1	1	1	1	1	2	1	2	2	2	2	2	2	2	2	2	2	3	3	5	3	3	5	5	3

Source: Competitive matches
A = Away; H = Home; W = Win; D = Draw; L = Loss

==== Matches ====
Win Draw Loss

25 September 2010 Round 1	USM Alger	1–2	ES Sétif	Bologhine
17:00	Daham 4'	Soccerway report	Hemani 44'; Metref 47'	Stadium: Omar Hammadi Stadium; Referee: Djamel Haimoudi

1 October 2010 Round 2	ES Sétif	3–1	WA Tlemcen	Sétif
20:00	Hachoud 27'; Hadj Aïssa 30'; Boucherit 84'	Soccerway report	Berramla 24'	Stadium: Stade 8 Mai 1945; Referee: Mokhtar Amalou

15 October 2010 Round 3	JSM Béjaïa	2–0	ES Sétif	Béjaïa
20:00	Zerdab 2', 46'	Soccerway report		Stadium: Stade de l'Unité Maghrébine; Referee: Mohamed Bichari

22 October 2010 Round 4	ES Sétif	2–0	USM El Harrach	Sétif
19:00	Djallit 68'; Delhoum 82'	Soccerway report	Hanitser (yellow card) 41' (yellow-red card) 55'	Stadium: Stade 8 Mai 1945; Referee: Kadda Babrahim

26 October 2010 Round 5	USM Blida	0–3	ES Sétif	Blida
17:00		Soccerway report	Djallit 18'; Metref 87'; Djabou 89'	Stadium: Stade Mustapha Tchaker; Referee: Mohamed Benouza

29 October 2010 Round 6	ES Sétif	3–1	MC Saïda	Sétif
19:00	Ghazali 5'; Djabou 48'; Hemani 49'	Soccerway report	Akkouche 90'	Stadium: Stade 8 Mai 1945; Referee: Farouk Mial

6 November 2010 Round 7	MC El Eulma	0–1	ES Sétif	El Eulma
14:30		Soccerway report	Hachoud 5'	Stadium: Stade Messaoud Zougar; Referee: Mokhtar Amalou

31 December 2010 Round 8	ES Sétif	2–2	MC Alger	Sétif
18:00	Daoud 67' (o.g.); Laïfaoui 90'	Soccerway report	Mokdad 64'; Babouche 77'	Stadium: Stade 8 Mai 1945; Referee: Djamel Haimoudi

27 November 2010 Round 9	AS Khroub	3–3	ES Sétif	El Khroub
14:30	Zegrour 3'; Si Hadj Mohand 10'; Mesfar 72'	Soccerway report	Ghazali 50'; Feham 86'; Djallit 89'	Stadium: Stade Abed Hamdani; Referee: Farouk Houasnia

3 December 2010 Round 10	ES Sétif	0–0	MC Oran	Sétif
18:00		Soccerway report		Stadium: Stade 8 Mai 1945; Referee: Ali Bouali

4 January 2011 Round 11	JS Kabylie	1–1	ES Sétif	Tizi Ouzou
14:30	Yaâlaoui 69'	Soccerway report	Metref 90'	Stadium: Stade du 1er Novembre 1954; Referee: Mohamed Bichari

17 December 2010 Round 12	ES Sétif	3–0	CA Bordj Bou Arreridj	Sétif
18:00	Metref 26'; Djabou 69'; Benmoussa 88'	Soccerway report		Stadium: Stade 8 Mai 1945; Referee: Mehdi Abid Charef

24 December 2010 Round 13	ASO Chlef	1–0	ES Sétif	Chlef
18:00	Belkaid 77' (o.g.)	Soccerway report		Stadium: Stade Mohamed Boumezrag; Referee: Sofiane Bousseter

8 March 2011 Round 14	ES Sétif	2–1	USM Annaba	Sétif
18:00	Metref 18'; Djabou 19'	Soccerway report	Messaoudi 86'	Stadium: Stade 8 Mai 1945; Referee: Farouk Mial

12 March 2011 Round 15	CR Belouizdad	0–0	ES Sétif	Belouizdad
14:30		Soccerway report		Stadium: Stade 20 Août 1955; Referee: Mokhtar Amalou

30 April 2011 Round 16	ES Sétif	2–0	USM Alger	Sétif
18:00	Hemani 33', 66'	Soccerway report		Stadium: Stade 8 Mai 1945; Referee: Farouk Mial

29 March 2011 Round 17	WA Tlemcen	1–1	ES Sétif	Tlemcen
15:30	Sameur 13'	Soccerway report	Hadj Aïssa 60'	Stadium: Stade Akid Lotfi; Referee: Sofiane Bousseter

17 May 2011 Round 18	ES Sétif	1–2	JSM Béjaïa	Sétif
19:00	Hemani 57' (pen.)	Soccerway report	N'Djeng 4'; Bouraba 90+4'	Stadium: Stade 8 Mai 1945; Referee: Mohamed Benouza

13 April 2011 Round 19	USM El Harrach	2–1	ES Sétif	Algiers
17:00	Boumechra 52' (pen.); Touahri 74'	Soccerway report	Diss 42'	Stadium: Stade 1er Novembre 1954; Referee: Farouk Houasnia

25 April 2011 Round 20	ES Sétif	2–2	USM Blida	Sétif
19:00	Koffi 11'; Metref 89'	Soccerway report	Harizi 36', 40' (pen.)	Stadium: Stade 8 Mai 1945; Referee: Mohamed Sahraoui

24 May 2011 Round 21	MC Saïda	1–1	ES Sétif	Saida
17:00	Madouni 37'	Soccerway report	Djahnit 5'	Stadium: April 13, 1958 Stadium; Referee: Sofiane Bousseter

6 June 2011 Round 22	ES Sétif	1–0	MC El Eulma	Sétif
19:00	Djabou 61'	Soccerway report		Stadium: Stade 8 Mai 1945; Referee: Mohamed Haddada

21 May 2011 Round 23	MC Alger	1–1	ES Sétif	Bologhine
17:00	Derrag 32'	Soccerway report	Hachoud 39'	Stadium: Omar Hammadi Stadium; Referee: Farouk Houasnia

18 June 2011 Round 24	ES Sétif	1–1	AS Khroub	Sétif
20:00	Metref 49'	Soccerway report	Hamedi 24'	Stadium: Stade 8 Mai 1945; Referee: Farouk Mial

31 May 2011 Round 25	MC Oran	1–0	ES Sétif	Oran
17:00	Aïssaoui 38'	Soccerway report		Stadium: Ahmed Zabana Stadium; Referee: Mokhtar Amalou

21 June 2011 Round 26	ES Sétif	2–0	JS Kabylie	Sétif
20:00	Hemani 24', 90+3'	Soccerway report		Stadium: Stade 8 Mai 1945; Referee: Youssef Zerrouki

25 June 2011 Round 27	CA Bordj Bou Arreridj	3–1	ES Sétif	Bordj Bou Arréridj
18:00	Bentayeb 7' (pen.); Djerrar 75'; Bakha 90'	Soccerway report	Djahnit 68'	Stadium: Stade 20 Août 1955; Referee: Sofiane Bousseter

28 June 2011 Round 28	ES Sétif	2–2	ASO Chlef	Sétif
18:00	Hachoud 48'; Hemani 62'	Soccerway report	Abdeslam 38'; Senouci 75'	Stadium: Stade 8 Mai 1945; Referee: Bouaza Chenane

1 July 2011 Round 29	USM Annaba	2–0	ES Sétif	Annaba
18:00	Benabdellah 23'; Bakrar 76'	Soccerway report		Stadium: May 19, 1956 Stadium; Referee: Mohamed Bichari

8 July 2011 Round 30	ES Sétif	2–0	CR Belouizdad	Sétif
18:00	Ghazali 50' (pen.); Hachoud 89'	Soccerway report		Stadium: Stade 8 Mai 1945; Referee: Khaled Saâdi

== Algerian Cup ==
29 December 2010 Round of 64	ES Sétif	2–0	CRB Merine	Sétif
18:00	Delhoum 31'; Hachoud 79'	Report		Stadium: Stade 8 Mai 1945; Referee: Bouchama, Seghiri, Bourahla
Note: Lineup for ES Sétif – Benmalek – Raho, Benchergui, Diss, Benchadi – Boucherit, Delhoum (Djahnit 76'), Feham (Hachoud 66') – Hadj Aïssa, Berguiga (Kourbia 46'), Benmoussa.

4 March 2011 Round of 32	ES Sétif	2–1	NA Hussein Dey	Sétif
18:00	Djabou 14', 46'	Report	El Okbi 89'	Stadium: Stade 8 Mai 1945; Referee: Sahraoui, Miloud, Naïr
Note: Lineup for ES Sétif – Chaouchi – Hachoud (Raho 72), Laïfaoui, Belkaïd, Benchadi – Delhoum, Lemmouchia (Feham 58'), Metref – Djabou (Djallit 58'), Hemani, Hadj Aïssa.

15 March 2011 Round of 16	ES Sétif	2–0	CA Batna	Sétif
18:00	Metref 53'; Djallit 60'	Report		Stadium: Stade 8 Mai 1945; Referee: Mohamed Bichari
Note: Lineup for ES Sétif – Chaouchi – Hachoud, Laïfaoui, Belkaïd, Benchadi (Zaâboub 73') – Feham, Lemmouchia, Metref – Djallit (Ghazali 64), Hemani (Traoré 77'), Hadj Aïssa.

9 April 2011 Quarter-finals	AB Mérouana	0–1	ES Sétif	Merouana
15:00		Report	Traoré 90+2'	Stadium: Stade Abderrahmane Bensaci; Referee: Ali Babou
Note: Lineup for ES Sétif – Chaouchi – Hachoud, Laïfaoui, Belkaïd, Zaâboub – Delhoum, Lemmouchia, Metref – Feham (Djabou 55'), Djallit (Hadj Aïssa 80'), Ambane (Traoré 46').

18 April 2011 Semi-finals	USM El Harrach	3–2	ES Sétif	Algiers
15:30	Boumechra 26', 70' (pen.); Boualem 87'	Report	Diss 13'; Traoré 43'	Stadium: Stade 1er Novembre; Referee: Mokhtar Amalou
Note: Lineup for ES Sétif – Chaouchi – Hachoud, Laïfaoui, Diss, Benchadi – Delhoum, Lemmouchia, Metref – Feham (Ghazali 76'), Traoré, Djabou (Djallit 78').

== Champions League ==
=== Group stage ===
==== Group A ====
Pos	Team	Pld	W	D	L	GF	GA	GD	Pts	Qualification
1	(Tunisia) Espérance ST	6	4	1	1	9	4	+5	13	Advance to knockout stage
2	(Democratic Republic of the Congo) TP Mazembe	6	3	2	1	8	7	+1	11	Advance to knockout stage
3	(Algeria) ES Sétif	6	1	3	2	7	6	+1	6	
4	(Zimbabwe) Dynamos	6	1	0	5	2	9	−7	3	

16 July 2010 1	ES Sétif (Algeria)	0–1	(Tunisia) Espérance ST	Sétif
20:30 UTC+1		Report	Bouazzi 53'	Stadium: Stade 8 Mai 1945; Referee: Daniel Bennett (South Africa)
Note: Lineup for ES Sétif – Farradji – Raho, Laïfaoui, Belkaïd, Benmoussa (Hachoud, 46') – Lemmouchia (c), Metref (Kacem, 64,), Delhoum, Feham (Djallit, 64') – Djabou, Ghazali

1 August 2010 2	TP Mazembe (Democratic Republic of the Congo)	2–2	(Algeria) ES Sétif	Lubumbashi
15:30 UTC+2	Mbenza 18'; Mputu 57' (pen.)	Report	Hemani 39', 50'	Stadium: Stade de la Kenya; Referee: Helder Martins de Carvalho (Angola)
Note: Lineup for ES Sétif – Chaouchi – Raho, Laïfaoui, Belkaïd, Yekhlef (Hachoud 13') – Delhoum, Lemmouchia, Feham – Djabou (Boucherit 82'), Hemani, Hadj Aïssa (Djallit 76').

15 August 2010 3	Dynamos (Zimbabwe)	1–0	(Algeria) ES Sétif	Harare
15:00 UTC+2	Sithole 31'	Report		Stadium: National Sports Stadium; Referee: Eddy Maillet (Seychelles)
Note: Lineup for ES Sétif – Ferradji – Raho, Diss, Belkaïd, Benchadi (Kacem 66') – Hachoud (Feham 41'), Lemmouchia, Boucherit, Djabou – Hadj Aïssa, Ghazali (Djallit 67').

27 August 2010 4	ES Sétif (Algeria)	3–0	(Zimbabwe) Dynamos	Sétif
22:00 UTC+1	Feham 32', 75'; Ghazali 77'	Report		Stadium: Stade 8 Mai 1945; Referee: Abdellah El Achiri (Morocco)
Note: Lineup for ES Sétif – Chaouchi – Hachoud, Laïfaoui, Belkaïd, Delhoum – Djabou (Kacem, 84'), Lemmouchia, Feham, Hadj Aissa (Diss, 89') – Djallit (Ambane, 66'), Ghazali.

11 September 2010 5	Espérance ST (Tunisia)	2–2	(Algeria) ES Sétif	Radès
20:30 UTC+1	O. Darragi 42'; Traouri 59'	Report	Ghazali 6', 85'	Stadium: Stade 7 November; Referee: Badara Diatta (Senegal)
Note: Lineup for ES Sétif – Chaouchi – Raho (Metref), Laïfaoui, Belkaïd, Hachoud – Delhoum (Ambane 46'), Lemmouchia, Feham – Djabou, Ghazali, Hadj Aïssa (Djallit 67').

18 September 2010 6	ES Sétif (Algeria)	0–0	(Democratic Republic of the Congo) TP Mazembe	Sétif
14:00 UTC+1		Report		Stadium: Stade 8 Mai 1945; Referee: Noumandiez Doué (Ivory Coast)
Note: Lineup for ES Sétif – Chaouchi – Hachoud, Laïfaoui, Diss, Metref – Boucherit, Lemmouchia, Hadj Aïssa – Djabou, Ghazali, Benmoussa (Djallit 67').

== Squad information ==
=== Playing statistics ===
No.	Pos	Nat	Player	Total		Ligue 1		Algerian Cup		Champions League	
No.	Pos	Nat	Player	Apps	Goals	Apps	Goals	Apps	Goals	Apps	Goals
Goalkeepers
28	GK	(Algeria) ALG	Mohamed Benhamou	11	0	11	0	0	0	0	0
	GK	(Algeria) ALG	Mohamed Seghir Ferradji	3	0	1	0	0	0	2	0
1	GK	(Algeria) ALG	Faouzi Chaouchi	25	0	17	0	4	0	4	0
12	GK	(Algeria) ALG	Boualem Benmalek	3	0	2	0	1	0	0	0
Defenders
27	DF	(Algeria) ALG	Abderahmane Hachoud	37	6	26	5	5	1	6	0
5	DF	(Algeria) ALG	Smaïl Diss	22	2	17	1	2	1	3	0
3	DF	(Algeria) ALG	Riad Benchadi	13	0	8	0	4	0	1	0
17	DF	(Algeria) ALG	Slimane Raho	19	0	13	0	2	0	4	0
22	DF	(Algeria) ALG	Mohamed Yekhlef	21	0	20	0	0	0	1	0
11	DF	(Algeria) ALG	Mokhtar Benmoussa	27	1	24	1	1	0	2	0
	DF	(Algeria) ALG	Abderrahmane Belkadi	1	0	1	0	0	0	0	0
4	DF	(Algeria) ALG	Abdelkader Laïfaoui	33	1	24	1	4	0	5	0
2	DF	(Algeria) ALG	Adel Lakhdari	9	0	9	0	0	0	0	0
	DF	(Algeria) ALG	Said Arroussi	3	0	3	0	0	0	0	0
Midfielders
15	MF	(Algeria) ALG	Bouazza Feham	32	3	22	1	5	0	5	2
13	MF	(Algeria) ALG	Mourad Delhoum	32	2	24	1	4	1	4	0
10	MF	(Algeria) ALG	Lazhar Hadj Aïssa	19	2	10	2	4	0	5	0
6	MF	(Algeria) ALG	Farouk Belkaid	21	0	13	0	3	0	5	0
8	MF	(Algeria) ALG	Khaled Lemmouchia	29	0	19	0	4	0	6	0
30	MF	(Algeria) ALG	Abdelmoumene Djabou	35	7	26	5	3	2	6	0
9	MF	(Algeria) ALG	Antar Boucherit	9	1	5	1	1	0	3	0
7	MF	(France) FRA	Sofiene Zaaboub	5	0	3	0	2	0	0	0
23	MF	(Algeria) ALG	Hocine Metref	27	8	20	7	4	1	3	0
24	MF	(Cameroon) CMR	Francis Ambane	8	0	5	0	1	0	2	0
	MF	(Algeria) ALG	Sid Ali Lamri	7	0	7	0	0	0	0	0
	MF	(Algeria) ALG	Akram Djahnit	7	1	6	1	1	0	0	0
Forwards
19	FW	(Algeria) ALG	Nabil Hemani	23	10	20	8	2	0	1	2
20	FW	(Algeria) ALG	Hamid Berguiga	6	0	5	0	1	0	0	0
	FW	(Algeria) ALG	Abdelmajid Tahraoui	1	0	1	0	0	0	0	0
16	FW	(Algeria) ALG	Moustapha Djallit	29	5	19	4	4	1	6	0
26	FW	(Algeria) ALG	Youcef Ghazali	21	6	14	3	2	0	5	3
	FW	(Burkina Faso) BFA	Koh Traoré	6	3	3	1	3	2	0	0
	FW	(Algeria) ALG	Ilyes Kourbia	3	0	2	0	1	0	0	0
Players transferred out during the season
	MF	(Algeria) ALG	Mehdi Kacem	3	0	0	0	0	0	3	0

Last updated: 19 November 2017
Source: fr.soccerway.com

== Transfers ==
=== In ===
Date	Pos.	Name	From	Fee
2 June 2010	DF	(Algeria) Abderahmane Hachoud	(Algeria) CA Bordj Bou Arreridj	Free
10 June 2010	FW	(Algeria) Moustapha Djallit	(Algeria) WA Tlemcen	Free
18 June 2010	FW	(Algeria) Youcef Ghazali	(Algeria) WA Tlemcen	20,000,000 DA
1 January 2011	GK	(Algeria) Mohamed Benhamou	Unattached	Free
6 January 2011	DF	(France) Sofiene Zaaboub	(England) Southend United	Free
12 January 2011	DF	(Algeria) Adel Lakhdari	(Algeria) US Biskra	Undisclosed

=== Out ===
Date	Pos.	Name	To	Fee
31 December	GK	(Algeria) Mohamed Seghir Ferradji	(Algeria) CA Bordj Bou Arreridj	3,000,000 DA
31 December	FW	(Algeria) Hamid Berguiga	—	Released

=== Loan out ===
Date from	Date to	Pos.	Name	To
2 July 2010	End of season	RB	(Algeria) Mokhtar Megueni	(Algeria) MC Saïda
