= 2011–12 USM El Harrach season =

USM El Harrach
2011–12 season
- Chairman: Mohamed Laib
- Head coach: Boualem Charef
- Stadium: Stade 1er Novembre 1954, Algiers
- Ligue 1: 10th
- Algerian Cup: Semi-final
- Top goalscorer: League: Baghdad Bounedjah (6); All: Baghdad Bounedjah (7)

In the 2011–12 season, USM El Harrach competed in the Ligue 1 for the 28th season, as well as the Algerian Cup.

== Squad list ==
Players and squad numbers last updated on 18 November 2011.
Note: Flags indicate national team as has been defined under FIFA eligibility rules. Players may hold more than one non-FIFA nationality.

No.	Nat.	Position	Name	Date of birth (age)	Signed from
Goalkeepers
Defenders
Midfielders
Forwards

== Competitions ==
=== Overview ===
Competition	Record								Started round	Final position / round	First match	Last match
Competition	G	W	D	L	GF	GA	GD	Win %	Started round	Final position / round	First match	Last match
Ligue 1	30	11	5	14	28	31	−3	36.67	—N/a	10th	10 September 2011	19 May 2012
Algerian Cup	5	3	1	1	9	4	+5	60.00	Round of 64	Semi-final	30 December 2011	20 April 2012
Total	35	14	6	15	37	35	+2	40.00				

Updated to match played 9 May 2018
Source: Competitions

== League table ==
Pos	Team	Pld	W	D	L	GF	GA	GD	Pts
8	WA Tlemcen	30	12	8	10	39	37	+2	44
9	JS Kabylie	30	10	11	9	29	23	+6	41
10	USM El Harrach	30	11	5	14	28	31	−3	38
11	MC El Eulma	30	10	8	12	38	39	−1	38
12	CS Constantine	30	8	12	10	35	42	−7	36

Updated to match(es) played on 19 April 2018. Source: DZFoot
Rules for classification: 1) points; 2) head-to-head points; 3) head-to-head goal difference; 4) goal difference; 5) total goals; 6) fairplay ranking; 7) playoff.

=== Results summary ===
Overall								Home						Away					
Pld	W	D	L	GF	GA	GD	Pts	W	D	L	GF	GA	GD	W	D	L	GF	GA	GD
30	11	5	14	28	31	−3	38	6	3	6	14	12	+2	5	2	8	14	19	−5

Last updated: 29 December 2014.
Source: Competitive matches

=== Results by round ===
Round	1	2	3	4	5	6	7	8	9	10	11	12	13	14	15	16	17	18	19	20	21	22	23	24	25	26	27	28	29	30
Ground	A	H	A	H	A	H	A	H	A	H	A	A	H	A	H	H	A	H	A	H	A	H	A	H	A	H	H	A	H	A
Result	W	L	W	W	L	W	W	L	L	W	D	L	W	D	L	L	W	W	L	L	L	W	W	L	L	D	D	L	D	L
Position																														

Source: Competitive matches
A = Away; H = Home; W = Win; D = Draw; L = Loss

=== Matches ===
10 September 2011 Round 1	MC Oran	1–2	USM El Harrach	Oran
16:00	Feddal 88'	Report	Touahri 60'; Bounedjah 78'	Stadium: Ahmed Zabana Stadium; Referee: Rafik Achouri

17 September 2011 Round 2	USM El Harrach	0–1	USM Alger	Algiers
20:30		Report	Boualem 6'	Stadium: Stade 5 Juillet 1962; Referee: Djamel Haïmoudi

24 January 2011 Round 3	MC Saïda	0–1	USM El Harrach	Saida
16:00		Report	Djarbou 25'	Stadium: April 13, 1958 Stadium; Referee: Redouane Necib

1 October 2011 Round 4	USM El Harrach	3–2	ES Sétif	Algiers
17:00	Saha 45'; Layati 48'; Aïssaoui 75' (pen.)	Report	Aoudia 55'; Gourmi 66' (pen.)	Stadium: Stade 1er Novembre 1954; Referee: Farouk Mial

15 October 2011 Round 5	CS Constantine	4–1	USM El Harrach	Constantine
16:00	Bouguerra 20'; Griche 25' (pen.); Zmit 31'; Djillali 83'	Report	Griche 5'	Stadium: Stade Mohamed Hamlaoui; Referee: Mohamed Sahraoui

22 October 2011 Round 6	USM El Harrach	1–0	NA Hussein Dey	Algiers
18:00	Yachir 88'	Report		Stadium: Stade 1er Novembre 1954; Referee: Mohamed Benouza

29 October 2011 Round 7	JS Kabylie	0–1	USM El Harrach	Tizi Ouzou
16:00		Report	Aïssaoui 10'	Stadium: Stade du 1er Novembre 1954; Referee: Redouane Necib

4 November 2011 Round 8	USM El Harrach	0–1	ASO Chlef	Algiers
15:00		Report	Messaoud 81'	Stadium: Stade 1er Novembre 1954; Referee: Sofiane Bousseter

19 November 2011 Round 9	MC Alger	2–1	USM El Harrach	Algiers
18:00	Sayah 3'; Babouche 21'	Report	Ziane Cherif 26'	Stadium: Stade 5 Juillet 1962; Referee: Mokhtar Amalou

22 November 2011 Round 10	USM El Harrach	1–0	CA Batna	Algiers
15:00	Benyettou 5'	Report		Stadium: Stade 1er Novembre 1954; Referee: Mohamed Amine Ghorbal

26 November 2011 Round 11	JSM Béjaïa	1–1	USM El Harrach	Béjaïa
15:00	Benchaïra 31'	Report	Bounedjah 34'	Stadium: Stade de l'Unité Maghrébine; Referee: Mohamed Benouza

3 December 2011 Round 12	AS Khroub	1–0	USM El Harrach	El Khroub
15:00	Belaïli 87'	Report		Stadium: Abed Hamdani Stadium; Referee: Mohamed Sahraoui

10 December 2011 Round 13	USM El Harrach	3–1	MC El Eulma	Algiers
15:00	Aïssaoui 41' (pen.); Benyettou 52'; Bounedjah 90+4'	Report	Gharbei 80'	Stadium: Stade 1er Novembre 1954; Referee: Mohamed Babou

17 December 2011 Round 14	CR Belouizdad	1–1	USM El Harrach	Belouizdad
18:00	Ammour 41'	Report	Touahri 81'	Stadium: Stade 20 Août 1955; Referee: Farouk Houasnia

24 December 2011 Round 15	USM El Harrach	0–1	WA Tlemcen	Algiers
15:00		Report	Belgherri 82'	Stadium: Stade 1er Novembre 1954; Referee: Mehdi Abid Charef

21 January 2012 Round 16	USM El Harrach	0–1	MC Oran	Algiers
15:00		Report	El Bahari 30'	Stadium: Stade 1er Novembre 1954; Referee: Farouk Mial

27 January 2012 Round 17	USM Alger	0–1	USM El Harrach	Algiers
15:00		Report	Aïssaoui 40'	Stadium: Stade 5 Juillet 1962; Referee: Mohamed Bichari

31 January 2012 Round 18	USM El Harrach	2–0	MC Saïda	Algiers
15:00	Bounedjah 10'; Bennai 88'	Report		Stadium: Stade 1er Novembre 1954; Referee: Farid Bahloul

4 February 2012 Round 19	ES Sétif	1–0	USM El Harrach	Sétif
17:45	Nadji 81'	Report		Stadium: Stade 8 Mai 1945; Referee: Redouane Necib

18 February 2012 Round 20	USM El Harrach	0–1	CS Constantine	Algiers
15:00		Report	Ziti 3'	Stadium: Stade 1er Novembre 1954; Referee: Mohamed Amine Ghorbal

3 March 2012 Round 21	NA Hussein Dey	2–0	USM El Harrach	Hussein Dey
15:00	Zenou 6'; Boussaïd 65'	Report		Stadium: Zioui Brothers Stadium; Referee: Sofiane Bousseter

17 March 2012 Round 22	USM El Harrach	1–0	JS Kabylie	Algiers
15:00	Bounedjah 4'	Report		Stadium: Stade 1er Novembre 1954; Referee: Mehdi Abid Charef

27 March 2012 Round 23	ASO Chlef	0–2	USM El Harrach	Chlef
17:45		Report	Bounedjah 16', 50'	Stadium: Stade Mohamed Boumezrag; Referee: Boubekeur Zouaoui

7 April 2012 Round 24	USM El Harrach	0–1	MC Alger	Algiers
17:45		Report	Demmou 34' (o.g.)	Stadium: Stade 1er Novembre 1954; Referee: Mohamed Bichari

14 April 2012 Round 25	CA Batna	3–2	USM El Harrach	Batna
15:00	El Hadi 52', 82'; Messadia 55'	Report	Lagraa 37'; Tatem 48'	Stadium: Mustapha Seffouhi Stadium; Referee: Farouk Mial

28 April 2012 Round 26	USM El Harrach	2–2	JSM Béjaïa	Algiers
16:00	Kerim 22'; Touahri 46'	Report	Gasmi 72' (pen.); Derrag 82'	Stadium: Stade 1er Novembre 1954; Referee: Redouane Necib

5 May 2012 Round 27	USM El Harrach	1–1	AS Khroub	Algiers
15:00	Tatem 76'	Report	Mechac 17'	Stadium: Stade 1er Novembre 1954; Referee: Said Aouina

28 May 2012 Round 28	MC El Eulma	1–0	USM El Harrach	El Eulma
15:00	Belakhdar 4'	Report		Stadium: Stade Messaoud Zougar; Referee: Mohamed Saïdi

15 May 2012 Round 29	USM El Harrach	0–0	CR Belouizdad	Algiers
18:00		Report		Stadium: Stade 1er Novembre 1954; Referee: Boubekeur Zouaoui

19 May 2012 Round 30	WA Tlemcen	2–1	USM El Harrach	Tlemcen
17:00	Belkaroui 60' (pen.); Belgherri 82'	Report	Benyettou 77' (pen.)	Stadium: Stade Akid Lotfi; Referee: Farid Bahloul

== Algerian Cup ==
30 December 2011 Round of 64	ES Kouba	0–2	USM El Harrach	Kouba
14:30		Report	Benyettou 26'; Djarbou 79'	Stadium: Omar Benhaddad Stadium; Referee: Farouk Mial

25 February 2012 Round of 32	USM El Harrach	2–0	ES Azeffoun	Algiers
14:00	Bounedjah 29'; Djarbou 51'	Report		Stadium: Stade 1er Novembre 1954; Referee: Rahmine, Seghiri, Bouaziz

9 March 2012 Round of 16	IR Bir Mourad Raïs	1–3 (a.e.t.)	USM El Harrach	Belouizdad
15:00	Ladaoui 88'	Report	Tatem 26'; Abid 95', 115'	Stadium: Stade 20 Août 1955; Referee: Rafik Achouri

10 March 2010 Quarter-finals	USM El Harrach	0–0 (a.e.t.) (4–1 p)	USM Alger	Algiers
20:30		Report		Stadium: Stade 5 Juillet 1962; Referee: Djamel Haimoudi
	Penalties
	Mohamed Lamine Abid (penalty scored); Abbas Aïssaoui (penalty scored); Baghdad Bounedjah (penalty scored); Karim Hendou (penalty scored)		(penalty missed) Farès Hemitti; (penalty missed) Khaled Lemmouchia; (penalty scored) Nacereddine Khoualed

20 April 2012 Semi-finals	ES Sétif	3–2	USM El Harrach	Sétif
20:30	Benmoussa 14' (pen.); Ndaney 49'; Hachoud 69' (pen.)	Report	Ziane Cherif 6', 90+4' (pen.)	Stadium: Stade 8 Mai 1945; Referee: Mohamed Benouza

== Squad information ==
=== Playing statistics ===
No.	Pos	Nat	Player	Total		Ligue 1		Algerian Cup	
No.	Pos	Nat	Player	Apps	Goals	Apps	Goals	Apps	Goals
Goalkeepers
30	GK	(Algeria) ALG	Azzedine Doukha	26	0	26	0	0	0
38	GK	(Algeria) ALG	Khaled Boukacem	1	0	1	0	0	0
1	GK	(Algeria) ALG	Houssam Limane	4	0	4	0	0	0
Defenders
19	DF	(Algeria) ALG	Ilès Ziane Cherif	20	1	20	1	0	0
29	DF	(Algeria) ALG	Adlen Griche	24	1	24	1	0	0
26	DF	(Algeria) ALG	Ammar Layati	17	1	17	1	0	0
13	DF	(Algeria) ALG	Abdelghani Demmou	23	0	23	0	0	0
55	DF	(Algeria) ALG	Adel Messaoudi	24	0	24	0	0	0
4	DF	(Algeria) ALG	Khaled Bosri	2	0	2	0	0	0
28	DF	(Algeria) ALG	Zine El Abidine Boulekhoua	8	0	8	0	0	0
Midfielders
10	MF	(Algeria) ALG	Abbas Aïssaoui	24	4	24	4	0	0
8	MF	(Algeria) ALG	Karim Hendou	27	0	27	0	0	0
	MF	(Algeria) ALG	Ismail Tatem	16	2	16	2	0	0
23	MF	(Algeria) ALG	Zoheir Benayache	1	0	1	0	0	0
	MF	(Chad) CHA	Yaya Kerim	9	1	9	1	0	0
	MF	(Algeria) ALG	Yanis Youssef	3	0	3	0	0	0
6	MF	(Algeria) ALG	Mohamed Lagraa	27	1	27	1	0	0
21	MF	(Algeria) ALG	Abdelhakim Djarbou	24	2	24	2	0	0
22	MF	(Algeria) ALG	Sofiane Saha	11	1	11	1	0	0
20	MF	(Algeria) ALG	Riad Gharrich	4	0	4	0	0	0
15	MF	(Algeria) ALG	Zakaria Kaouadji	14	0	14	0	0	0
Forwards
7	FW	(Algeria) ALG	Ali Sami Yachir	8	1	8	1	0	0
14	FW	(Algeria) ALG	Sofiane Hanitser	5	0	5	0	0	0
11	FW	(Algeria) ALG	Amine Touahri	23	3	23	3	0	0
9	FW	(Algeria) ALG	Mohamed Noureddine Bennai	13	1	13	1	0	0
16	FW	(Algeria) ALG	Youcef Chibane	1	0	1	0	0	0
31	FW	(Algeria) ALG	Baghdad Bounedjah	20	6	20	6	0	0
25	FW	(Algeria) ALG	Mohamed Benyettou	24	3	24	3	0	0
	FW	(Algeria) ALG	Lamine Abid	12	0	12	0	0	0
	FW	(Algeria) ALG	Djaballah Boulemdais	2	0	2	0	0	0
Players transferred out during the season

Last updated: 29 November 2017
Source: fr.soccerway.com

== Transfers ==
=== In ===
Date	Pos	Player	From club	Transfer fee	Source
1 July 2011	GK	(Algeria) Khaled Boukacem	USM Blida	Free transfer	
1 July 2011	DF	(Algeria) Ilès Ziane Cherif	Olympique de Médéa	Free transfer	
1 July 2011	DF	(Algeria) Zine El Abidine Boulekhoua	USM Aïn Beïda	Free transfer	
1 July 2011	MF	(Algeria) Sofiane Saha	US Remchi	Free transfer	
1 July 2011	MF	(Algeria) Abbas Aïssaoui	MC Oran	Free transfer	
1 July 2011	MF	(Algeria) Ismail Tatem	USM Alger	Free transfer	
1 July 2011	MF	(Algeria) Yanis Youssef	MC Alger	Free transfer	
1 July 2011	MF	(Chad) Yaya Kerim	(Chad) Renaissance	Free transfer	
1 July 2011	FW	(Algeria) Baghdad Bounedjah	RCG Oran	Free transfer	
26 July 2011	FW	(Algeria) Mohamed Benyettou	SA Mohammadia	Free transfer	
26 July 2011	MF	(Algeria) Riad Gharrich	SA Mohammadia	Free transfer	
27 July 2011	MF	(Algeria) Abdelhakim Djarbou	US Biskra	Free transfer	
20 August 2011	FW	(Algeria) Youcef Chibane	RC Kouba	Free transfer	
1 January 2012	MF	(Algeria) Zoheir Benayache	CR Belouizdad	Undisclosed	

=== Out ===
Date	Pos	Player	To club	Transfer fee	Source
1 July 2011	MF	(Algeria) Messaoud Gharbei	MC El Eulma	Free transfer	
12 July 2011	DF	(Algeria) Farès Benabderahmane	CR Belouizdad	Undisclosed	
18 July 2011	MF	(Algeria) Mohamed Boualem	USM Alger	Free transfer	
18 July 2011	MF	(Algeria) Salim Boumechra	USM Alger	Free transfer	
9 August 2011	DF	(Algeria) Abdelmalek Djeghbala	MC Alger	Free transfer	
3 January 2012	FW	(Algeria) Ali Sami Yachir	MC Alger	Free transfer	
