= 2011 Algerian Cup final =

- Stade du 5 Juillet hosted the match
- Event: 2010–11 Algerian Cup
USM El Harrach	JS Kabylie
0	1
- Date: 1 May 2011
- Venue: Stade 5 Juillet 1962, Algiers
- Referee: Mehdi Abed Cherif
- Attendance: 60,000

The 2011 Algerian Cup final was the final of the 47th edition of the Algerian Cup. The game was held on May 1, 2011 at the Stade 5 Juillet 1962 in Algiers between USM El Harrach and JS Kabylie. JS Kabylie won the game 1–0 with a goal from Farès Hamiti in the 13th minute of the game. It was JS Kabylie's fifth time winning the Algerian Cup.

== Background ==
Prior to the 2011 final, JS Kabylie had reached the final of the Algerian Cup eight times, winning four of them. The last time the club had reached the final was in 2004, where they lost to USM Alger in penalties. The last time they won the trophy was in 1994, where they beat AS Ain M'lila 1–0 in the final with a goal from Tarek Hadj Adlane. On the other hand, USM El Harrach reached the final of the Algerian Cup just twice prior to the 2011 final, winning on both occasions. The last time they won was in 1987, where they beat JS Bordj Ménaïel 1–0 in the final.

During the season, the two teams had met just once prior to the Algerian Cup final, with USM El Harrach winning the game 1–0 at home with a goal from Mohamed Boualem.

== Route to the final ==
USM El Harrach		Round	JS Kabylie	
CC Sig; H 4–1	Latrèche 16', Touahri 47', Boumechra 60', Kabla 82'	Round of 64	IRB Sedrata; H 2–1 (aet)	Tedjar 20', Berchiche 55'
NARB Réghaïa; H 2–1 (aet)	Baouche 62', Legraâ 94'	Round of 32	ES Mostaganem; A 0–1	Yahia-Chérif 39'
MO Béjaïa; A 1–0	Boualem 90'	Round of 16	MC El Eulma; H 2–1 (aet)	Hamiti 45', 91'
MC Saïda; H 1–0	Bendahmane 90' (o.g.)	Quarter-finals	CR Belouizdad; H 4–2	Hamiti 16', 43', Tedjar 55', Younès 83'
ES Sétif; H 3–2	Boumechra 26', 70', Boualem 87'	Semi-Finals	MC Oran; H 2–1	Khelili 9', Hamiti 82'

== Match details ==
1 May 2011
16:00

USM El Harrach	0–1	JS Kabylie
	Report (in French)	Farès Hamiti 13'

Stade 5 Juillet 1962, Algiers
Referee: Mehdi Abid Charef

USM EL HARRACH	JS KABYLIE

GK	30	(Algeria) Azzedine Doukha
RB	22	(Algeria) Abdelmalek Djeghbala
CB	5	(Algeria) Abdelghani Demmou
CB	29	(Algeria) Adlen Griche (c)	(substituted off) 46'
LB	6	(Algeria) Mohamed Legraâ
RM	7	(France) Ali Sami Yachir	(substituted off) 67'
CM	8	(Algeria) Karim Hendou
CM	18	(Algeria) Messaoud Gharbi
LM	41	(Algeria) Brahim Ledraâ	(substituted off) 46'
CF	10	(Algeria) Salim Boumechra
CF	31	(Algeria) Mohamed Boualem
Substitutes:
GK	36	(Algeria) Miloud Mahfoud
FW	11	(Algeria) Amine Touahri	(substituted in) 46'
CB	28	(Algeria) Farès Benabderahmane	(substituted in) 46'
FW	17	(Algeria) Ayoub Latrèche
FW		(Algeria) Chaouki Mabrouk Chache	(substituted in) 67'
Manager:
(Algeria) Boualem Charef

GK	1	(Algeria) Malik Asselah
RB	26	(Algeria) Belkacem Remache
CB	3	(Algeria) Sofiane Khelili
CB	5	(Algeria) Ali Rial (c)
LB	4	(Algeria) Chemseddine Nessakh	(substituted off) 64'
RM	10	(Algeria) Sofiane Younès
CM	6	(Algeria) Hocine El Orfi
CM	8	(Algeria) Saad Tedjar	(substituted off) 78'
CM	20	(Algeria) Lyès Saïdi
LM	7	(Algeria) Sid Ali Yahia-Chérif	(substituted off) 85'
CF	9	(Algeria) Farès Hamiti
Substitutes:
GK	13	(Algeria) Mourad Berrefane
DF	21	(Algeria) Koceila Berchiche
LB	24	(Algeria) Nassim Oussalah	(substituted in) 64'
MF	18	(Algeria) Lamara Douicher	(substituted in) 85'
MF	23	(Algeria) Mokhtar Lamhene	(substituted in) 78'
MF	29	(Algeria) Nabil Yaâlaoui
FW	25	(Madagascar) Ibrahim Amada
Manager:
(Algeria) Rachid Belhout

MATCH OFFICIALS

- Assistant referees:
  - Abdelhak Etchiali
  - Mohamed Mounir Bitam
- Fourth official:
  - Boulfelfel

== See also ==
- 2010–11 Algerian Cup
- Algerian Cup
