= 2010–11 MC Saïda season =

MC Saïda
2010–11 season
- President: Khaldi Mohamed
- Head Coach: Said Hammouchi
- Stadium: April 13, 1958 Stadium
- Ligue 1: 6th
- Algerian Cup: Quarter-finals
- Top goalscorer: League: Laïd Madouni (7 goals); All: Laïd Madouni (8 goals)
Home colours	Away colours

The 2010–11 season will be MC Saïda's 10th season in the Algerian top flight, newly renamed to the Algerian Ligue Professionnelle 1 due to the professionalization of it. MC Saïda will seek to win their first league title. They will be competing in Ligue 1, and the Algerian Cup.

== Squad list ==
Players and squad numbers last updated on 26 October 2010.
Note: Flags indicate national team as has been defined under FIFA eligibility rules. Players may hold more than one non-FIFA nationality.

No.	Nat.	Position	Name	Date of Birth (Age)	Signed from
Goalkeepers
12	(Algeria)	GK	Merouane Kial	5 March 1972 (aged 38)	(Algeria) CA Bordj Bou Arréridj
1	(Algeria)	GK	Mourad Azzioune	2 January 1981 (aged 29)	(Algeria) AS Khroub
14	(Algeria)	GK	Ali Bencherif	23 September 1988 (aged 22)	(Algeria) Youth system
Defenders
29	(Algeria)	RB	Kada El Hadjari	1 July 1984 (aged 26)	(Algeria) USM Annaba
6	(Algeria)	LB	Anis Bouziane	13 October 1985 (aged 24)	(Germany) SC Freiburg II
15	(Algeria)	CB	Abdeslam Mebarakou	8 August 1980 (aged 30)	(Algeria) USM El Harrach
20	(Algeria)	CB	Mokhtar Megueni	24 July 1989 (aged 21)	(Algeria) ES Sétif
5	(Algeria)	CB	Youcef Nehari	1 June 1984 (aged 26)	(Algeria) NA Hussein Dey
4	(Algeria)	RB	Mohamed Bekhtaoui	23 November 1984 (aged 25)	(Algeria) US Biskra
3	(Algeria)	LB	Chafik Mokdad	4 November 1989 (aged 20)	(Algeria) CR Temouchent
	(Algeria)	CB	Arslane Mazari	6 January 1989 (aged 21)	(Algeria) USM El Harrach
13	(Algeria)		Lounes Laouzai	26 December 1989 (aged 20)	(Slovakia) Topvar Topoľčany
Midfielders
16	(Algeria)	DM	Lounés Bendahmane	3 April 1977 (aged 33)	(Algeria) CR Belouizdad
	(Algeria)	DM	Nourredine Abdellaoui	13 November 1983 (aged 26)	(Algeria) MC El Eulma
21	(Algeria)		Abdelhak Atek	29 April 1987 (aged 23)	(Algeria) USM Bel-Abbès
25	(Algeria)	MF	Mohamed Touaoula	18 January 1984 (aged 26)	(Algeria) ES Mostaganem
22	(Algeria)	DM	Mohamed Saâdi	23 August 1987 (aged 23)	(Algeria) CA Bordj Bou Arreridj
	(Algeria)	MF	Abdelaziz Abidi	13 February 1982 (aged 28)	(Algeria) ASM Oran
18	(Algeria)		Toufik Addadi	7 October 1990 (aged 19)	(Algeria) Youth system
10	(Algeria)	MF	Abdelkader Hani	1 January 1984 (aged 26)	(France) Trélissac FC
23	(Algeria)	DM	Mohamed Zaoui	10 September 1986 (aged 24)	(Algeria) Youth system
8	(Algeria)	DM	Ali Amiri	23 October 1987 (aged 22)	(Algeria) WA Boufarik
Forwards
11	(Algeria)	ST	Hocine Fenier	5 March 1983 (aged 27)	(Algeria) CR Belouizdad
17	(Algeria)	ST	Mohamed Cheraïtia	14 February 1982 (aged 28)	(Algeria) MC El Eulma
9	(Algeria)	ST	Abdenour Hadiouche	30 December 1984 (aged 25)	(Algeria) MC El Eulma
7	(Algeria)	ST	Yassine Akkouche	28 July 1984 (aged 26)	(Algeria) JS Kabylie
24	(Algeria)	ST	Laïd Madouni	23 June 1986 (aged 24)	(Algeria) ES Mostaganem
19	(Algeria)	ST	Ahmed Bousmaha	17 May 1990 (aged 20)	(Algeria) Youth system
	(Guinea)	ST	Ibrahim Khalil Sylla	5 March 1988 (aged 22)	(Libya) Al-Ahly SC
	(Algeria)		Amine Soudani	19 March 1991 (aged 19)	(Algeria) ?

== Competitions ==
=== Overview ===
Competition	Record								Started round	Final position / round	First match	Last match
Competition	G	W	D	L	GF	GA	GD	Win %	Started round	Final position / round	First match	Last match
Ligue 1	30	11	9	10	33	35	−2	36.67	—N/a	6th	25 September 2010	8 July 2011
Algerian Cup	4	2	1	1	2	1	+1	50.00	Round of 64	Quarter-final	29 December 2010	8 April 2011
Total	34	13	10	11	35	36	−1	38.24				

Updated to match played 3 June 2019
Source: Competitions

=== Ligue 1 ===
==== League table ====
Pos	Team	Pld	W	D	L	GF	GA	GD	Pts
4	USM El Harrach	30	12	10	8	36	31	+5	46
5	CR Belouizdad	30	12	9	9	33	26	+7	45
6	MC Saïda	30	11	9	10	33	35	−2	42
7	MC Oran	30	11	8	11	26	27	−1	41
8	AS Khroub	30	10	9	11	30	36	−6	39

Updated to match(es) played on 19 April 2018. Source: DZFoot
Rules for classification: 1) points; 2) head-to-head points; 3) head-to-head goal difference; 4) goal difference; 5) total goals; 6) fairplay ranking; 7) playoff.

==== Results summary ====
Overall								Home						Away					
Pld	W	D	L	GF	GA	GD	Pts	W	D	L	GF	GA	GD	W	D	L	GF	GA	GD
30	11	9	10	33	35	−2	42	10	5	0	24	10	+14	1	4	10	9	25	−16

Last updated: 22 April 2018.
Source: Competitive matches

==== Results by round ====
Round	1	2	3	4	5	6	7	8	9	10	11	12	13	14	15	16	17	18	19	20	21	22	23	24	25	26	27	28	29	30
Ground																														
Result																														
Position																														

Source: Competitive matches
A = Away; H = Home; W = Win; D = Draw; L = Loss

=== League ===
25 September 2010 Round 1	MC Saïda	2–1	CR Belouizdad	Saida
17:00	Touaoula 17'; Fenier 22'	Soccerway report	Slimani 90+2'	Stadium: April 13, 1958 Stadium; Referee: Farid Bahloul

2 October 2010 Round 2	USM Alger	2–2	MC Saïda	Bologhine
17:00	Daham 38'; Ghazi 66' (pen.)	Soccerway report	18' Bekhtaoui; 40' Akkouche	Stadium: Omar Hamadi Stadium; Referee: Sofiane Bousseter

16 October 2010 Round 3	MC Saïda	1–0	CA Bordj Bou Arreridj	Saida
17:00	Bousmaha 82'	Soccerway report		Stadium: April 13, 1958 Stadium; Referee: Abdelkader Karabi

22 October 2010 Round 4	WA Tlemcen	1–2	MC Saïda	Tlemcen
16:00	Boukhiar 53'	Soccerway report	Hadiouche 3', 36'	Stadium: Stade Akid Lotfi; Referee: Djamel Haimoudi

26 October 2010 Round 5	MC Saïda	1–0	USM Annaba	Saida
17:00	Madouni 83'	Soccerway report		Stadium: April 13, 1958 Stadium; Referee: Mokhtar Amalou

29 October 2010 Round 6	ES Sétif	3–1	MC Saïda	Sétif
19:00	Ghazali 5'; Djabou 48'; Hemani 49'	Soccerway report	Akkouche 90'	Stadium: Stade 8 Mai 1945; Referee: Farouk Mial

6 November 2010 Round 7	MC Saïda	1–1	ASO Chlef	Saïda
14:30	Cheraïtia 45'	Soccerway report	Soudani 75'	Stadium: Stade 13 Avril 1958; Referee: Mehdi Abid Charef

30 November 2010 Round 8	JSM Béjaïa	4–0	MC Saïda	Béjaïa
18:00	Maïza 5'; N'Djeng 50', 84'; Gasmi 66'	Soccerway report		Stadium: Stade de l'Unité Maghrébine; Referee: Sofiane Bousseter

26 November 2010 Round 9	MC Saïda	1–1	USM El Harrach	Saida
15:00	Hendou 44' (o.g.)	Soccerway report	Yachir 62'	Stadium: April 13, 1958 Stadium; Referee: Boubekeur Zouaoui

3 December 2010 Round 10	MC Saïda	1–0	JS Kabylie	Saïda
15:00	Hadiouche 54'	Soccerway report		Stadium: Stade 13 Avril 1958; Referee: Redouane Necib

11 December 2010 Round 11	USM Blida	1–0	MC Saïda	Blida
14:30	Mokhtar 39'	Soccerway report		Stadium: Stade Mustapha Tchaker; Referee: Mokhtar Amalou

18 December 2010 Round 12	MC Saïda	1–0	MC El Eulma	Saida
14:30	Madouni 5'	Soccerway report		Stadium: April 13, 1958 Stadium; Referee: Kadda Babrahim

22 February 2011 Round 13	MC Alger	0–0	MC Saïda	Rouiba
14:30		Soccerway report		Stadium: Stade Mabrouki Salem; Referee: Boubekeur Zouaoui

19 February 2011 Round 14	MC Saïda	3–0	AS Khroub	Saida
14:30	Akkouche 25'; Madouni 49'; Saâdi 77'	Soccerway report		Stadium: April 13, 1958 Stadium; Referee: Mohamed Haddada

26 February 2011 Round 15	MC Oran	1–0	MC Saïda	Oran
14:30	El Hadjari 40' (o.g.)	Soccerway report		Stadium: Ahmed Zabana Stadium; Referee: Farouk Houasnia

19 March 2011 Round 16	CR Belouizdad	1–0	MC Saïda	Belouizdad
14:30	Bourakba 62'	Soccerway report		Stadium: Stade 20 Août 1955; Referee: Ali Babou

29 March 2011 Round 17	MC Saïda	1–1	USM Alger	Saïda
14:30	Bendahmane 73'	Soccerway report	84' Boulebda	Stadium: Stade 13 Avril 1958; Referee: Boubekeur Zouaoui

2 April 2011 Round 18	CA Bordj Bou Arreridj	2–0	MC Saïda	Bordj Bou Arréridj
15:30	Benchergui 49'; Bentayeb 58'	Soccerway report		Stadium: Stade 20 Août 1955; Referee: Sofiane Bousseter

15 April 2011 Round 19	MC Saïda	5–2	WA Tlemcen	Saida
17:00	Cheraïtia 4', 40'; Madouni 7', 48', 75'	Soccerway report	Boudjakdji 78' (pen.); Mebarki 81'	Stadium: April 13, 1958 Stadium; Referee: Mohamed Sahraoui

25 April 2011 Round 20	USM Annaba	1–0	MC Saïda	Annaba
17:00	Benchaâbane 82'	Soccerway report		Stadium: May 19, 1956 Stadium; Referee: Rafik Achouri

24 May 2011 Round 21	MC Saïda	1–1	ES Sétif	Saida
17:00	Madouni 37'	Soccerway report	Djahnit 5'	Stadium: April 13, 1958 Stadium; Referee: Sofiane Bousseter

13 May 2011 Round 22	ASO Chlef	0–0	MC Saïda	Chlef
20:00		Soccerway report		Stadium: Stade Mohamed Boumezrag; Referee: Mohamed Haddada

21 May 2011 Round 23	MC Saïda	0–0	JSM Béjaïa	Saida
17:00		Soccerway report		Stadium: April 13, 1958 Stadium; Referee: Boubekeur Zouaoui

28 May 2011 Round 24	USM El Harrach	2–1	MC Saïda	Algiers
17:00	Bekhtaoui 4' (o.g.); Boumechra 27'	Soccerway report	Benabderahmane 32' (o.g.)	Stadium: Stade 1er Novembre 1954; Referee: Farouk Mial

18 June 2011 Round 25	JS Kabylie	0–0	MC Saïda	Tizi Ouzou
20:00		Soccerway report		Stadium: Stade 1er Novembre 1954; Referee: Farouk Houasnia

11 June 2011 Round 26	MC Saïda	3–2	USM Blida	Saida
18:00	Akkouche 43'; Zaoui 48'; Nehari 85'	Soccerway report	Touahri 67'; Harizi 88'	Stadium: April 13, 1958 Stadium; Referee: Rafik Achouri

25 June 2011 Round 27	MC El Eulma	5–2	MC Saïda	El Eulma
18:00	Benamokrane 15'; Hebbaïche 36' (pen.); Deghiche 47', 61'; Boulemdaïs 82' (pen.)	Soccerway report	Cheraïtia 10'; Sylla 63'	Stadium: Stade Messaoud Zougar; Referee: Mokhtar Amalou

28 June 2011 Round 28	MC Saïda	2–1	MC Alger	Saida
18:00	Zaoui 45+2'; Akkouche 90'	Soccerway report	Bouchema 56'	Stadium: April 13, 1958 Stadium; Referee: Mohamed Babou

1 July 2011 Round 29	AS Khroub	2–1	MC Saïda	El Khroub
18:00	Belaïli 37'; Boutnaf 49'	Soccerway report	Cheraïtia 15'	Stadium: Stade Abed Hamdani; Referee: Khaled Saâdi

8 July 2011 Round 30	MC Saïda	1–0	MC Oran	Saida
18:00	Zaoui 85'	Soccerway report		Stadium: April 13, 1958 Stadium; Referee: Youssef Zerrouki

== Algerian Cup ==
31 December 2010 Round of 64	MC Saïda	0–0 (4–2 p)	USM Alger	Saïda
14:15		Report		Stadium: Stade 13 Avril 1958; Referee: Rafik Achouri
Note: Lineup for MC Saïda - Kial - Nehari, Mokdad (Hadiouche 74’), Bendahmane, Megueni - Addadi, Atek (Bekhtaoui 91’), Saâdi - Cheraïtia, Madouni, Akkouche (Touaoula 63’).

4 March 2011 Round of 32	MC Saïda	1–0	USM Bel Abbès	Saïda
15:00	Saâdi 48'	Report		Stadium: Stade 13 Avril 1958; Referee: Sofiane Bousseter
Note: Lineup for MC Saïda - Kial - Megueni, Atek (Bendahmane 46’), Bekhtaoui, Mokdad - Addadi, Abdelaoui, Saâdi, Zaoui (Mezli 85’) - Bousmaha (Hadiouche 54’), Madouni.

15 March 2011 Round of 16	MC Saïda	1–0	ASO Chlef	Saïda
14:30	Madouni 38'	Report		Stadium: Stade des frères Braci; Referee: Mokhtar Amalou
Note: Lineup for MC Saïda - Kial - El Hadjari, Mokdad (Nehari 73’), Bekhtaoui, Meguenni - Zaoui (Adjabi 68’), Bendahmane, Abdelaoui, Saâdi - Cheraïtia, Madouni (Mazri 88’).

8 April 2011 Quarter-finals	USM El Harrach	1–0	MC Saïda	Algiers
15:30	Bendahmane 90' (o.g.)	Report		Stadium: Stade 1er Novembre 1954; Referee: Bahloul, Bougherara, Zid
Note: Lineup for MC Saïda - Kial - El Hadjari, Megueni, Nehari, Bakhtaoui, Mokdad (Bousmaha 59’) - Addadi, Abdellaoui, Mezli (Mebarakou 59’) - Cheraïtia, Madouni.

== Squad information ==
=== Playing statistics ===
No.	Pos	Nat	Player	Total		Ligue 1		Algerian Cup	
No.	Pos	Nat	Player	Apps	Goals	Apps	Goals	Apps	Goals
Goalkeepers
12	GK	(Algeria) ALG	Merouane Kial	24	0	24	0	0	0
1	GK	(Algeria) ALG	Mourad Azzioune	1	0	1	0	0	0
14	GK	(Algeria) ALG	Ali Bencherif	7	0	7	0	0	0
Defenders
29	DF	(Algeria) ALG	Kada El Hadjari	21	0	21	0	0	0
6	DF	(Algeria) ALG	Anis Bouziane	2	0	2	0	0	0
15	DF	(Algeria) ALG	Abdeslam Mebarakou	13	0	13	0	0	0
20	DF	(Algeria) ALG	Mokhtar Megueni	15	0	15	0	0	0
5	DF	(Algeria) ALG	Youcef Nehari	23	1	23	1	0	0
4	DF	(Algeria) ALG	Mohamed Bekhtaoui	24	1	24	1	0	0
	DF	(Algeria) ALG	Arslane Mazari	1	0	1	0	0	0
	DF	(Algeria) ALG	Benatia	1	0	1	0	0	0
	DF	(Algeria) ALG	Mohamed Ziani	1	0	1	0	0	0
Midfielders
16	MF	(Algeria) ALG	Lounés Bendahmane	26	1	26	1	0	0
	MF	(Algeria) ALG	Nourredine Abdellaoui	13	0	13	0	0	0
21	MF	(Algeria) ALG	Abdelhak Atek	19	0	19	0	0	0
25	MF	(Algeria) ALG	Mohamed Touaoula	12	1	12	1	0	0
	MF	(Algeria) ALG	Mohamed Saâdi	26	1	26	1	0	0
	MF	(Algeria) ALG	Abdelaziz Abidi	1	0	1	0	0	0
18	MF	(Algeria) ALG	Toufik Addadi	15	0	15	0	0	0
	MF	(Algeria) ALG	Alah Eddine Souar	3	0	3	0	0	0
	MF	(Algeria) ALG	Djamel Mezli	6	0	6	0	0	0
	MF	(Algeria) ALG	Amine Soudani	2	0	2	0	0	0
	MF	(Algeria) ALG	Abdelkader Hani	4	0	4	0	0	0
Forwards
11	FW	(Algeria) ALG	Hocine Fenier	2	1	2	1	0	0
17	FW	(Algeria) ALG	Mohamed Cheraïtia	27	5	27	5	0	0
9	FW	(Algeria) ALG	Abdenour Hadiouche	11	3	11	3	0	0
7	FW	(Algeria) ALG	Yassine Akkouche	22	5	22	5	0	0
23	FW	(Algeria) ALG	Mohamed Zaoui	14	3	14	3	0	0
24	FW	(Algeria) ALG	Laïd Madouni	24	7	24	7	0	0
19	FW	(Algeria) ALG	Ahmed Bousmaha	12	1	12	1	0	0
	FW	(Algeria) ALG	Bendjiane	1	0	1	0	0	0
3	FW	(Algeria) ALG	Chafik Mokdad	19	0	19	0	0	0
	FW	(Algeria) ALG	Zine El Dine Hamedi	1	0	1	0	0	0
	FW	(Guinea) GUI	Ibrahim Khalil Sylla	6	0	6	0	0	0
Players transferred out during the season

Last updated: 25 November 2017
Source: fr.soccerway.com

== Transfers ==
=== In ===
Date	Pos	Player	from club	Transfer fee	Source
