= 2010–11 Algerian Ligue Professionnelle 1 =

Algerian Ligue Professionnelle 1
- Season: 2010–11
- Dates: 24 September 2010 – 8 July 2011
- Champions: ASO Chlef (1st title)
- Relegated: USM Annaba; CA Bordj Bou Arréridj; USM Blida
- CAF Champions League: ASO Chlef; JSM Béjaïa
- CAF Confederation Cup: ES Sétif
- Matches: 240
- Goals: 514 (2.14 per match)
- Top goalscorer: El Arbi Hillel Soudani (18)
- Biggest home win: CR Belouizdad 7-1 JS Kabylie (22 May 2011)
- Biggest away win: 0-3 (3 occasions)
- Highest scoring: CR Belouizdad 7-1 JS Kabylie (22 May 2011)
- Longest winning run: ES Sétif; CR Belouizdad (4 games)
- Longest unbeaten run: ASO Chlef (8 games)
- Longest losing run: CA Bordj Bou Arréridj (5 games)

The 2010–11 Algerian Ligue Professionnelle 1 was the 49th season of the Algerian Ligue Professionnelle 1 since its establishment in 1962. A total of 16 teams contested the league, with MC Alger as the defending champions. The league started on September 24, 2010. and ended on July 8, 2011.

On June 21, 2011, ASO Chlef were officially crowned champions after second-placed CR Belouizdad lost to USM El Harrach. In doing so, they won their first Algerian league title in the club's history. At the bottom, USM Annaba, CA Bordj Bou Arréridj and USM Blida were relegated to the Algerian Ligue Professionnelle 2.

== Overview ==
At the start of the season, the name of the league was changed to Ligue Professionnelle 1 from Algerian Championnat National to reflect the professionalization of the league.

=== Promotion and relegation ===
Teams promoted from 2009–10 Algerian Championnat National 2

- MC Saïda

Teams relegated to 2010–11 Algerian Ligue Professionnelle 2

- CA Batna
- MSP Batna
- NA Hussein Dey

=== Stadiums ===
Team	Location	Stadium	Stadium capacity
AS Khroub	El Khroub	Stade Abed Hamdani	8,000
ASO Chlef	Chlef	Stade Mohamed Boumezrag	17,000
CA Bordj Bou Arreridj	Bordj Bou Arreridj	Stade 20 Août 1955	18,000
CR Belouizdad	Algiers	Stade 20 Août 1955	21,000
ES Sétif	Sétif	Stade 8 Mai 1945	25,000
JS Kabylie	Tizi Ouzou	Stade 1er Novembre	20,000
JSM Béjaïa	Béjaïa	Stade de l'Unité Maghrébine	24,000
MC Alger	Algiers	Stade 5 Juillet 1962	76,000
MC El Eulma	El Eulma	Stade Messaoud Zougar	25,000
MC Oran	Oran	Stade Ahmed Zabana	45,000
MC Saïda	Saïda	Stade 13 Avril 1958	20,000
USM Alger	Algiers	Stade Omar Hammadi	15,000
USM Annaba	Annaba	Stade 19 Mai 1956	56,000
USM Blida	Blida	Stade Mustapha Tchaker	35,000
USM El Harrach	Algiers	Stade 1er Novembre	8,000
WA Tlemcen	Tlemcen	Stade Akit Lotfi	30,000

=== Personnel and kits ===
Note: Flags indicate national team as has been defined under FIFA eligibility rules. Players and Managers may hold more than one non-FIFA nationality.

Team	Manager	Captain	Kit manufacturer	Shirt sponsor
AS Khroub	(Algeria) Zoheïr Djelloul			
ASO Chlef	(Algeria) Meziane Ighil			
CA Bordj Bou Arreridj	(France) Ladislas Lozano	(Algeria) Sid Ahmed Belouahem	Patrick	Nedjma
CR Belouizdad	(Argentina) Miguel Angel Gamondi		Sarson	Nedjma
ES Sétif	(Italy) Giovanni Dellacasa	(Algeria) Khaled Lemmouchia	KCS	
JS Kabylie	(Algeria) Rachid Belhout	(Algeria) Lamara Douicher	Erreà	Nedjma
JSM Béjaïa	(Algeria) Fouad Bouali	(Algeria) Brahim Zafour	Uhlsport	Nedjma
MC Alger	(Algeria) Noureddine Zekri	(Algeria) Réda Babouche	Joma	Djezzy
MC El Eulma	(Algeria) Abdelkrim Bira			Nedjma
MC Oran	(Algeria) Tahar Cherif El-Ouazzani	(Algeria) Kada Kechamli	Adidas	Nedjma
MC Saïda	(Algeria) Toufik Rouabah			
USM Alger	(France) Hervé Renard			
USM Annaba	(Algeria) Mustapha Biskri			Nedjma
USM Blida	(Algeria) Mokhtar Assas	(Algeria) Lounès Gaouaoui		
USM El Harrach	(Algeria) Boualem Charef		Soca Sport	Boulabe
WA Tlemcen	(Algeria) Mohamed Henkouche			

=== Managerial changes ===
Team	Outgoing manager	Manner of departure	Date of vacancy	Table	Incoming manager	Date of appointment	Table
ES Sétif	(Algeria) Noureddine Zekri	Contract terminated	18 August 2010	Pre-season	(Italy) Giovanni Solinas	?	Pre-season
USM Annaba	(Algeria) Abdelkader Amrani	Resigned	2 November 2010	15th	(Algeria) Mustapha Biskri	2 November 2010	15th
JS Kabylie	(Switzerland) Alain Geiger	Resigned	13 December 2010	8th	(Algeria) Rachid Belhout		
USM Alger	(Algeria) Noureddine Saâdi	Contract terminated	13 December 2010	9th	(France) Hervé Renard	21 February 2011	10th
ES Sétif	(Italy) Gianni Solinas	Resigned	22 December 2010		(Italy) Gianni Dellacasa	13 January 2011	
MC Alger	(France) Alain Michel	Contract terminated	9 March 2011	14th	(Algeria) Noureddine Zekri	11 March 2011	14th

== League table ==
Pos	Team	Pld	W	D	L	GF	GA	GD	Pts	Qualification or relegation
1	ASO Chlef (C)	30	19	6	5	51	20	+31	63	Qualification for the Champions League preliminary round
2	JSM Béjaïa	30	14	8	8	47	32	+15	50	Qualification for the Champions League preliminary round
3	ES Sétif	30	12	11	7	43	31	+12	47	Qualification for the Confederation Cup preliminary round
4	USM El Harrach	30	12	10	8	36	31	+5	46	
5	CR Belouizdad	30	12	9	9	33	26	+7	45	
6	MC Saïda	30	11	9	10	33	35	−2	42	
7	MC Oran	30	11	8	11	26	27	−1	41	
8	AS Khroub	30	10	9	11	30	36	−6	39	
9	USM Alger	30	9	11	10	32	28	+4	38	
10	MC Alger	30	8	13	9	30	28	+2	37	
11	JS Kabylie	30	10	7	13	26	37	−11	37	
12	WA Tlemcen	30	10	7	13	35	36	−1	37	
13	MC El Eulma	30	9	9	12	32	40	−8	36	
14	USM Annaba (R)	30	10	6	14	23	34	−11	36	Relegation to Ligue Professionnelle 2
15	CA Bordj Bou Arreridj (R)	30	8	5	17	21	46	−25	29	Relegation to Ligue Professionnelle 2
16	USM Blida (R)	30	7	8	15	16	30	−14	29	Relegation to Ligue Professionnelle 2

Updated to match(es) played on 19 April 2018. Source: DZFoot
Rules for classification: 1) points; 2) head-to-head points; 3) head-to-head goal difference; 4) goal difference; 5) total goals; 6) fairplay ranking; 7) playoff.
(C) Champions; (R) Relegated

== Results ==
Home \ Away	ASK	ASC	CBA	CRB	ESS	JSK	JBE	MCA	MCEE	MCO	MCS	UAL	USMA	USB	UEH	WAT
AS Khroub		0–3	2–0	0–0	3–3	1–0	4–2	2–3	0–0	1–2	2–1	0–0	3–1	1–0	1–0	2–1
ASO Chlef	2–0		1–0	2–1	1–0	3–0	2–0	1–0	5–0	2–1	0–0	3–2	4–0	2–0	2–0	3–1
CA Bordj Bou Arreridj	0–1	1–0		2–1	3–1	0–2	2–2	1–1	1–1	1–0	2–0	2–1	1–0	0–0	0–3	0–1
CR Belouizdad	1–1	2–1	2–0		0–0	7–1	0–1	2–1	3–1	2–1	1–0	0–0	2–0	1–0	0–1	1–0
ES Sétif	1–1	2–2	3–0	2–0		2–0	1–2	2–2	1–0	0–0	3–1	2–0	2–1	2–2	2–0	3–1
JS Kabylie	3–2	0–0	1–0	1–1	1–1		1–0	0–0	3–2	1–0	0–0	1–0	1–0	0–1	1–0	3–0
JSM Béjaïa	0–0	4–1	3–0	1–1	2–0	4–2		1–1	5–2	1–0	4–0	3–2	1–0	1–0	0–2	0–1
MC Alger	0–0	0–1	3–1	1–1	1–1	1–1	0–0		3–1	0–1	0–0	0–0	2–2	1–0	2–0	1–0
MC El Eulma	2–1	2–4	2–0	0–0	0–1	2–0	0–2	1–0		1–0	5–2	1–1	2–0	1–0	3–0	0–0
MC Oran	1–0	1–0	1–0	1–2	1–0	0–0	2–1	1–1	1–1		1–0	1–0	1–0	1–1	2–2	2–0
MC Saïda	3–0	1–1	1–0	2–1	1–1	1–0	0–0	2–1	1–0	1–0		1–1	1–0	3–2	1–1	5–2
USM Alger	1–0	0–0	2–1	0–0	1–2	3–1	2–3	1–2	2–0	2–0	2–2		3–0	3–1	0–0	0–0
USM Annaba	3–0	0–0	0–0	1–0	2–0	2–1	1–0	2–1	0–0	2–0	1–0	1–0		1–1	2–1	1–1
USM Blida	0–1	0–2	1–2	0–1	0–3	1–0	1–0	1–0	1–1	0–0	1–0	0–1	1–0		0–0	1–0
USM El Harrach	1–1	1–3	2–0	1–0	2–1	1–0	3–3	1–0	1–1	3–3	2–1	0–0	3–0	2–0		1–0
WA Tlemcen	2–0	1–0	5–1	4–0	1–1	2–1	1–1	1–2	2–0	2–1	1–2	0–2	2–0	0–0	2–2	

Updated to match(es) played on 8 July 2011. Source: Algerian Ligue
Legend: Blue = home team win; Yellow = draw; Red = away team win.

== Season statistics ==
=== Top scorers ===
Rank	Scorer	Club	Goals
1	(Algeria) El Arbi Hillel Soudani	ASO Chlef	18
2	(Cameroon) Yannick N'Djeng	JSM Bejaïa	14
3	(Algeria) Hamza Boulemdaïs	MC El Eulma	11
3	(Algeria) Salim Boumechra	USM El Harrach	11
3	(Algeria) Noureddine Daham	USM Alger	11
3	(Algeria) Mohamed Messaoud	ASO Chlef	11
7	(Algeria) Ramzi Bourakba	CR Belouizdad	10
7	(Algeria) Islam Slimani	CR Belouizdad	10
9	(Algeria) Abdelmalek Mokdad	MC Alger	9
10	(Algeria) Seddik Berradja	MC Oran	8
10	(Algeria) Mohamed Boualem	USM El Harrach	8
10	(Algeria) Nabil Hemani	ES Sétif	8
13	(Algeria) Anwar Mohamed Boudjakdji	WA Tlemcen	7
13	(Algeria) Ahmed Gasmi	JSM Bejaïa	7
13	(Algeria) Laïd Madouni	MC Saïda	7
13	(Algeria) Hocine Metref	ES Sétif	7
17	(Algeria) Farès Hamiti	JS Kabylie	6
17	(Algeria) Zahir Zerdab	JSM Béjaïa	6
19	(Algeria) Yassine Akkouche	MC Saïda	5
19	(Algeria) Mohamed Amine Aoudia	JS Kabylie	5
19	(Algeria) Toufik Benamokrane	MC El Eulma	5
19	(Algeria) Mohamed Cheraïtia	MC Saïda	5
19	(Algeria) Abdelmoumene Djabou	ES Sétif	5
19	(Algeria) Lamouri Djediat	ASO Chlef	5
19	(Algeria) Abdelkader Harizi	USM Blida	5
19	(Algeria) Mohamed Rabie Meftah	JSM Béjaïa	5
19	(Algeria) Chemseddine Nessakh	JS Kabylie	5
19	(Algeria) Nouri Ouznadji	USM Alger	5
19	(Algeria) Aboubaker Rebih	CR Belouizdad	5
19	(Algeria) Abdelhak Sameur	WA Tlemcen	5

== See also ==
- 2010–11 Algerian Ligue Professionnelle 2
- 2010–11 Algerian Cup
