= Lyès Saïdi =

Algerian footballer (born 1987)

Personal information
- Full name: Lyès Saïdi
- Date of birth: August 24, 1987 (age 39)
- Place of birth: Sidi Aïch, Algeria
- Position: Defensive midfielder

Team information
- Current team: MC Oran

Youth career
- SS Sidi Aïch

Senior career*
| Years | Team | Apps | (Gls) |
| –2009 | ORB Akbou | - | (-) |
| 2009–2012 | JS Kabylie | 34 | (0) |
| 2012–2013 | ASO Chlef | 3 | (0) |
| 2013–2015 | MC Oran | 27 | (0) |

International career^{‡}
| 2011 | Algeria Military | - | (-) |
Medal record
Representing Algeria
Men's Football
| Gold medal – first place | Rio 2011 | Team competition |
- * Club domestic league appearances and goals as of 00:00, June 21, 2015 (EST) ‡ National team caps and goals as of 00:00, June 21, 2015 (EST)

Lyès Saïdi (born August 24, 1987) is an Algerian footballer who last played for Algerian Ligue Professionnelle 1 club MC Oran.

== Club career ==
In the summer of 2009, Saïdi signed a two-year contract with JS Kabylie, joining them on a free transfer from ORB Akbou.

On May 2, 2011, Saïdi started for JS Kabylie in the 2011 Algerian Cup Final against USM El Harrach. JS Kabylie went on to win the game 1–0 with Saïdi playing the entire game. It was his first title with the club.

== Honours ==
- Won the Algerian Cup once with JS Kabylie in 2011
- Won the World Military Cup once with the Algeria military national football team in 2011
