= Rachid Belhout =

Algerian footballer (1944–2020)

Personal information
- Date of birth: June 14, 1944
- Place of birth: Sétif, Algeria
- Date of death: August 9, 2020 (aged 76)
- Place of death: Nancy, France
- Position: Forward

Team information
- Current team: Al-Ahly Benghazi (Manager)

Youth career
- FC Othe-Montmédy
- ES Longuyonnaise
- Le Havre
- FC Antibes

Senior career*
| Years | Team | Apps | (Gls) |
- Virton

Managerial career
- RJ Arlon
- O Eischen
- FA Red Boys Differdange
- RLC Bastogne
- USB Longwy
- 1998: FC Wiltz
- FC Lorrain Arlon
- Racing FC Luxembourg
- 2005–2006: Virton
- 2006–2007: ES Sétif
- 2007–2008: ASO Chlef
- 2008–2009: MC El Eulma
- 2009–2010: Olympique Béja
- 2010–2011: JS Kabylie
- 2011–2011: US Monastir
- 2012: CS Constantine
- 2012: ASO Chlef
- 2012–2013: MC El Eulma
- 2013: CABBA
- 2014–2015: CS Constantine
- 2019–2020: Al-Ahly Benghazi
- * Club domestic league appearances and goals

Rachid Belhout (Arabic: رشيد بلحوت; June 14, 1944 – August 9, 2020) was an Algerian football manager and player. At the time of his death, he was managing Al-Ahly Benghazi in the Libyan Premier League.

== Early life ==
Belhout was born on June 14, 1944, in Sétif. At age 4, he moved with his family to France.

== Managerial career ==
Belhout received his coaching license from the Royal Belgian Football Association. He began his career by coaching a number of amateur and semi-professional teams in Belgium and Luxembourg. In 2005, he was appointed as coach of Virton, who were then playing in the Belgian Second Division.

In 2007, Belhout led USM Alger to the final of the Algerian Cup, where they lost 1–0 to MC Alger.

On December 22, 2010, Belhout was appointed as manager of JS Kabylie. On May 1, 2011, he won the 2010–11 Algerian Cup by beating USM El Harrach 1–0 in the final. On June 26, 2011, Belhout resigned from his position as manager of the club.

On July 19, 2011, Belhout signed a one-year contract with Tunisian club Union Sportive Monastir.

On February 10, 2012, he signed a one-year contract with Algerian club CS Constantine.

== Death ==
Belhout died August 9, 2020, aged 76, after being involved in a traffic collision in Nancy, France.

== Honours ==
=== Manager ===
Olympique Béja

- Tunisian President Cup: 2010

JS Kabylie

- Algerian Cup: 2011

USM Alger

- Algerian Cup runner-up: 2007
