= Sofiene Zaaboub =

French-Algerian footballer (born 1983)

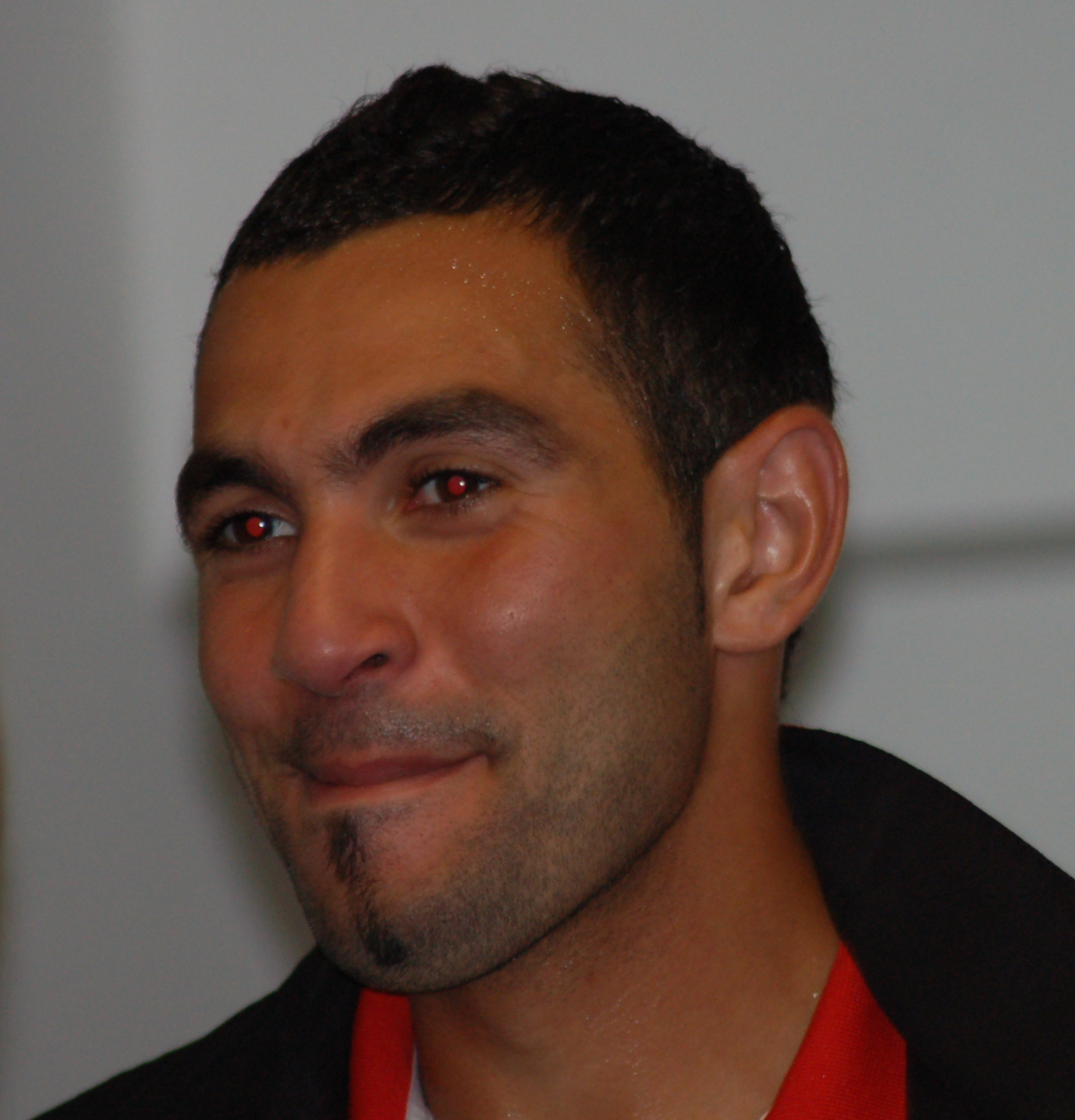

Personal information
- Full name: Sofiene Zaaboub
- Date of birth: 23 January 1983 (age 43)
- Place of birth: Montereau-Fault-Yonne, France
- Height: 1.78 m (5 ft 10 in)
- Position: Left midfielder

Youth career
- 199?–1998: Amicale Montereau
- 1998–2003: Saint-Étienne B

Senior career*
| Years | Team | Apps | (Gls) |
| 2000–2003 | Saint-Étienne B | 20 | |
| 2003–2004 | Modena | 10 | (0) |
| 2003–2004 | → A.S. Sora (loan) | 6 | (0) |
| 2004–2005 | Jaén | 0 | (0) |
| 2005–2006 | FC Brussels | 20 | (1) |
| 2006–2008 | Swindon Town | 56 | (1) |
| 2008–2009 | Walsall | 29 | (0) |
| 2010–2011 | Southend United | 3 | (0) |
| 2011–2012 | ES Sétif | 14 | (0) |
| 2012–2013 | USM Annaba | | |
| Total | | 158+ | (2+) |
- * Club domestic league appearances and goals

Sofiene Zaaboub (born 23 January 1983) is a French-Algerian former football player who has become renowned for wearing gloves regardless of the weather conditions.

== Club career ==
=== Swindon Town ===
Zaaboub was Paul Sturrock's first signing as Town manager and signed on a short-term deal in November 2006 after leaving FC Brussels, just a few days after Sturrock had arrived at the club. Prior to joining Swindon he had many trials at higher-level clubs – including Úbeda CF, Preston North End, Swansea City, Plymouth Argyle, Luton Town, Dundee and FC Metz, but his longest trial was at Sturrock's former club Sheffield Wednesday. He scored his first and what turned out to be only Swindon goal in a 2–1 win over Wrexham on 13 January 2007.

==== End of reign at the County Ground ====
Due to the reinforcement made to the Swindon Town side with the likes of Anthony McNamee running an un-touchable string of games on the left for the Robins, Zaaboub was deemed surplus to the requirements of the club. Unable to break into the first team, the 2006/07 fans' favourite was told in March 2008 his contract would not be renewed and at the end of the season would be forced to find a new club.

=== Walsall ===
Zaaboub completed a move to Walsall in July 2008 and became Walsall's fourth signing of the summer. He suffered injuries to his back and groin in the pre-season and was unable to break into the first team on his return. However, he resolved to keep up his fitness and try his best in training to gain a first team place, he did gain his place back with a number of superb displays down the left wing, he quickly became a favourite with the fans

=== ES Sétif ===
On 6 January 2011, Zaaboub signed an 18-month contract with Algerian club ES Sétif.
