= Mohamed Haniched =

Algerian footballer (born 1968)

Personal information
- Date of birth: 30 April 1968 (age 58)
- Place of birth: Blida, Algeria

Senior career*
Years	Team	Apps	(Gls)
1994–1997	US Chaouia		
1997–2000	USM Blida		
2000–2003	US Chaouia		
2003–2004	USM Blida		
2004–2010	US Chaouia		

International career
1993–1997	Algeria	18	(0)

Managerial career
- 2014–2015: MC Alger (goalkeeper coach)
- 2016–2017: USM El Harrach (goalkeeper coach)
- 2016: USM El Harrach
- 2017–2018: USM Blida (goalkeeper coach)
- * Club domestic league appearances and goals

Mohamed Haniched (born 30 April 1968) is an Algerian footballer. He played in 18 matches for the Algeria national football team from 1993 to 1997. He was also named in Algeria's squad for the 1996 African Cup of Nations tournament.

He has later been a goalkeeper coach and manager.
