= Merouane Kial =

Algerian footballer (born 1972)

Personal information
- Date of birth: March 5, 1972 (age 54)
- Place of birth: Tixter, Algeria
- Height: 1.80 m (5 ft 11 in)
- Position: Goalkeeper

Senior career*
| Years | Team | Apps | (Gls) |
| 1993–2010 | CA Bordj Bou Arréridj | | |
| 2010–2012 | MC Saïda | 48 | (0) |
| 2012–2014 | MO Constantine | | |

Managerial career
- 2018–2019: CA Bordj Bou Arréridj (goalkeeper coach)
- * Club domestic league appearances and goals

Merouane Kial (born March 5, 1972) is an Algerian former football player.

== Club career ==
Kial spent the first 17 seasons of his professional career with CA Bordj Bou Arréridj. On July 26, 2010, he left the club. He signed a two-year contract with MC Saïda, joining them on a free transfer. In 2012, Kial signed a two-year contract with MO Constantine.

After retiring he worked as a coach.

== Honours ==
- Finalist of the Algerian Cup once with CA Bordj Bou Arréridj in 2009
