= Miloud Mahfoud =

Algerian footballer (born 1985)

Personal information
- Full name: Miloud Mahfoud
- Date of birth: November 30, 1985 (age 40)
- Place of birth: Tiaret, Algeria
- Position: Goalkeeper

Senior career*
Years	Team	Apps	(Gls)
–2010	MB Sidi Chami	-	(-)
2010–2011	USM El Harrach	7	(0)
- * Club domestic league appearances and goals as of 00:00, 15 August 2011 (UTC)

Miloud Mahfoud (born November 30, 1985) is an Algerian football player. He is currently unattached, after playing for USM El Harrach in the Algerian Ligue Professionnelle 1.

== Club career ==
In the summer of 2010, Mahfoud joined USM El Harrach from MB Sidi Chami. On February 15, 2011, Mahfoud made his professional debut for USM El Harrach as a starter in a league game against MC Alger. USM El Harrach won the game 1–0.

== Honours ==
- Finalist of the Algerian Cup once with USM El Harrach in 2011
