= Zoheïr Djelloul =

Algerian footballer and manager

Personal information
- Full name: Zoheïr Djelloul

Senior career*
Years	Team	Apps	(Gls)
	CA Kouba	-	(-)
	RC Kouba	-	(-)
	OMR El Annasser	-	(-)

Managerial career
- 2006–2007: ES Sétif (Assistant)
- 2007–2010: Algeria (Assistant)
- 2011–2011: AS Khroub
- 2012: Al-Nasr Salalah
- 2016–2016: USM Blida
- * Club domestic league appearances and goals

Zoheïr Djelloul is an Algerian football manager. He last coached AS Khroub in the Algerian Ligue Professionnelle 1.

== Playing career ==
During his playing career, Djelloul played for three clubs in Algiers: CA Kouba, RC Kouba and OMR El Annasser.

== Coaching career ==
Djelloul was a graduate of the ISTS (Institut des Sciences et Technologie du Sport). He coached briefly at his former club OMR El Annasser and as assistant coach of the Algeria Under-23 national team before moving to Canada to find work. He spent 9 years in Canada coaching various amateur sides, while also working as a taxicab driver.

In 2006, Djelloul returned to Algeria to become assistant coach of ES Sétif, working under Rabah Saâdane. He was a member of the coaching staff when Sétif won their first Arab Champions League in 2006.

In October 2007, Djelloul became assistant coach of the Algerian National Team after Rabah Saâdane was appointed as the head coach. With Algeria, Djelloul participated in the 2010 Africa Cup of Nations and the 2010 FIFA World Cup. On October 21, 2011, Djelloul resigned from his post as assistant coach of the Algerian National Team.

On January 25, 2011, Djelloul was appointed as head coach of Algerian club AS Khroub. However, in April 2011, his contract was terminated after a string of bad results.
