= Abdelghani Demmou =

Algerian football player (born 1989)

Personal information
- Full name: Abdelghani Demmou
- Date of birth: January 29, 1989 (age 37)
- Place of birth: Mohammadia, Algeria
- Height: 1.86 m (6 ft 1 in)
- Position: Defender

Team information
- Current team: MC Alger
- Number: 24

Senior career*
Years	Team	Apps	(Gls)
2007–2010	SA Mohammadia	-	(-)
2010–2013	USM El Harrach	63	(0)
2013–2015	ES Sétif	36	(0)
2015–	MC Alger	24	(0)

International career
2016–	Algeria U23	0	(0)
- * Club domestic league appearances and goals as of August 3, 2016

Abdelghani Demmou (Arabic: عبد الغني دمو; born January 29, 1989) is an Algerian football player who currently plays for MC Alger in the Algerian Ligue Professionnelle 1. He commonly plays as a centre back.

== Club career ==
In the summer of 2009, Demmou was linked with a move to MC Oran. However, his club, SA Mohammadia, refused to sell the player.

In the summer of 2010, Demmou was again linked with a move away from his club, this time to USM El Harrach. SA Mohammadia put a 5 million Algerian dinars price tag on the player. He ended up joining the club in July with the transfer details not disclosed.

On May 1, 2011, Demmou was a starter for USM El Harrach in the 2011 Algerian Cup Final against JS Kabylie. However, they ended up losing the match 1–0. Demmou now plays for MC Alger, where he has won an Algerian Cup. MC Alger won the Final on 2 May 2016 against NA Hussein Dey (1–0).

== International career ==
Demmou was called up to the senior Algeria squad for the 2017 Africa Cup of Nations qualifiers against Seychelles on 2 June 2016.

== Honours ==
- Finalist of the Algerian Cup once with USM El Harrach in 2011

ES Sétif

- CAF Champions League: 2014
- CAF Super Cup: 2015
- Algerian Ligue Professionnelle 1: 2014–15
- Algerian Cup with MC Alger: 2015–16
