= Boualem Charef =

Algerian football manager

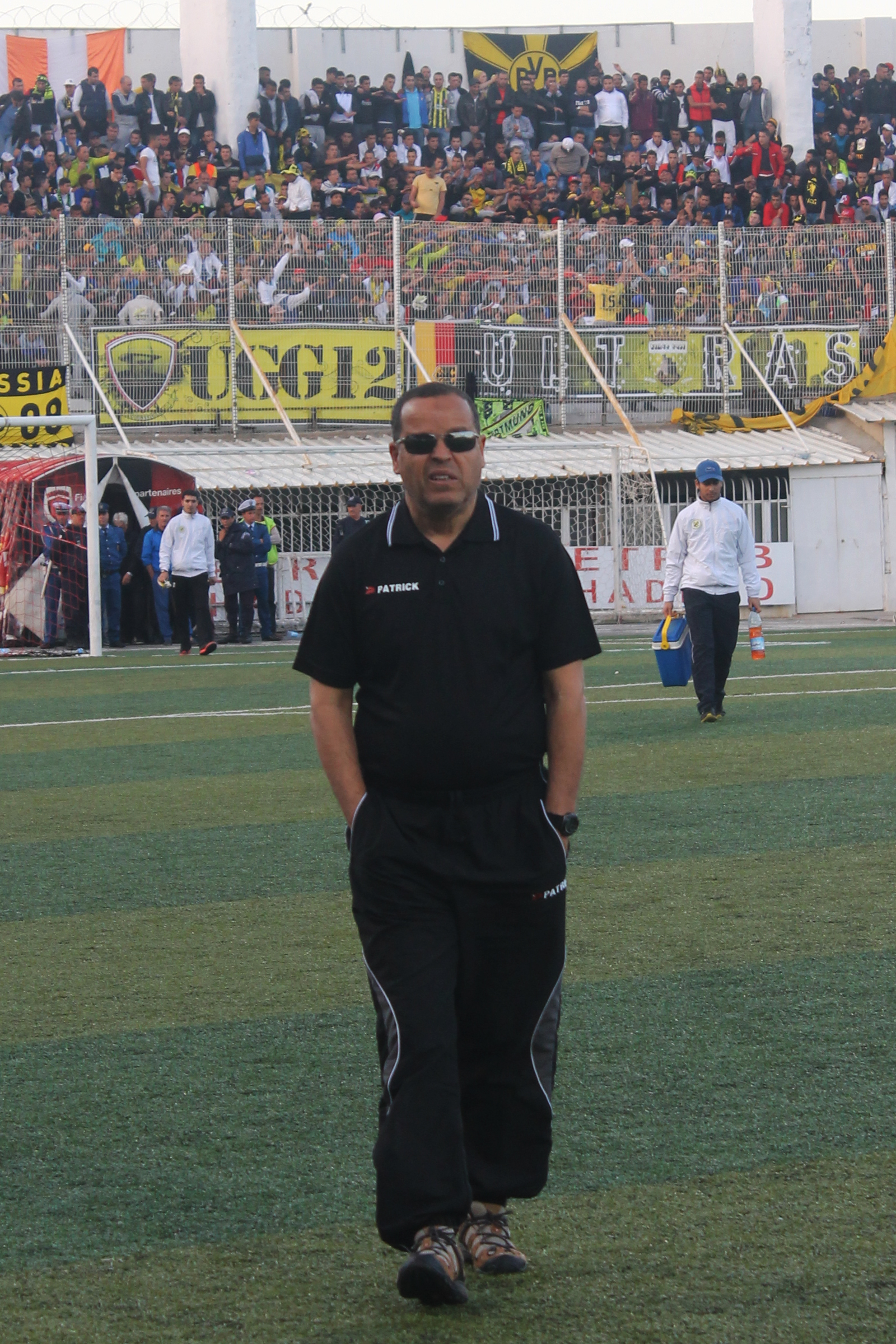

Personal information
- Full name: Boualem Charef
- Date of birth: 17 February 1958 (age 68)

Team information
- Current team: USM El Harrach (head coach)

Managerial career
- Years: Team
- 1999–1999: Algeria
- 2001–2002: WA Tlemcen
- 2002–2002: ES Sétif
- 2003–2004: Algeria (assistant)
- 2004–2005: ASM Oran
- 2005–2005: USM Annaba
- 2006–2006: USM El Harrach
- 2007–2008: ASM Oran
- 2008–2014: USM El Harrach
- 2014: MC Alger
- 2015: USM Bel-Abbès
- 2015–2016: USM El Harrach
- 2016–2017: USM El Harrach
- 2022: USM Alger
- 2023–: USM El Harrach

Boualem Charef (Arabic: بوعلام شارف; is an Algerian football manager and retired professional player.

== Career ==
Boualem Charef was a graduate of the Institut des Sciences et Technologies du Sport in Algiers. During his studies there, he was also the assistant coach to Ali Benfadah. In July 2003, Charef was selected by Algeria national football team manager Rabah Saâdane to be his assistant. In 2008, Boualem Charef signed with the new promoted USM El Harrach and one of his most prominent ambitions is to rely on training, and he was behind the brilliance of several players most notably Baghdad Bounedjah. In 2011 Charef reached the final of the Algerian Cup where they was defeated against JS Kabylie. On 1 October 2012 the technician was pinned by the Disciplinary Committee of the Ligue de Football Professionnel (LFP). A very severe sanction explained through a press release. The LFP Disciplinary Committee imposed a six month suspension on Charef for unsportsmanlike behavior towards officials during the match against MC El Eulma. In the 2012–13 season, Charef competed strongly for the league title until the last round and lost by two points to ES Setif, which is his best result since the beginning of his training career. On 14 September 2013 Boualem Charef resigned after the home defeat against USM Alger the 4th consecutive since the start of the Ligue Professionnelle 1, this departure is the end of five years with yellow and black which is an exception in Algerian football, and tangible tension appeared between him and President Mohamed Laib, especially because of Bounedjah’s transfer.

On 16 December 2013 Charef was again punished with a one month and six month suspension for his assistant Mohamed Haniched. On 4 August 2022 USM Alger contracted with Boualem Charef to be the new coach with his staff Mustapha Amellal (first assistant), Mohamed Haniched (goalkeeping coach) and Moufdi Cherdoud (physical trainer), Charef had previously been in post at CR Belouizdad for three and a half years in charge of training development. Boualem Charef received a lot of criticism from USMA supporters because of the performance, which did not convince them. Charef stated that the players do not have consistency between them and he does not have enough time to gather them all because of the Algeria A' national team that was preparing for the CHAN 2022, Where was the coach Madjid Bougherra summoning 9 players for evry preparatory internship. On 25 December 2022 USM Alger terminated the contract with Charef, with three months compensation.

== Managerial statistics ==
As of match played 25 December 2022

Team	Nat	From	To	Record				
Team	Nat	From	To	P	W	D	L	Win %
USM El Harrach	(Algeria)	1 July 2008	30 June 2014	203	86	53	64	42.36
MC Alger	(Algeria)	27 May 2014	9 November 2014	10	3	3	4	30.00
USM Bel-Abbès	(Algeria)	9 January 2015	15 February 2015	5	1	0	4	20.00
USM El Harrach	(Algeria)	2 March 2015	30 April 2016	38	13	12	13	34.21
USM El Harrach	(Algeria)	1 July 2016	12 May 2017	28	9	11	8	32.14
USM Alger	(Algeria)	4 August 2022	25 December 2022	17	9	5	3	52.94
Career Total				301	121	84	96	40.20

== Honours ==
WA Tlemcen

- Algerian Cup: 2002

MC Alger

- Algerian Super Cup: 2014
