= Adlen Griche =

Algerian footballer (born 1979)

Adlen Griche عدلان قريش
Personal information
- Full name: Adlen Griche
- Date of birth: 3 March 1979 (age 47)
- Place of birth: Constantine, Algeria
- Position: Defender

Team information
- Current team: RC Kouba
- Number: 29

Senior career*
Years	Team	Apps	(Gls)
2006–2007	MO Constantine	-	(-)
2007–2008	CS Constantine	-	(-)
2008–2009	USM El Harrach	-	(-)
2009–2010	Shabab Al-Ordon	-	(-)
2010–2012	USM El Harrach	42	(2)
2012–2013	CS Constantine	0	(0)
2013–2014	CRB Aïn Fakroun	0	(0)
2014–2015	Olympique de Médéa	0	(0)
2015–2017	CA Batna	0	(0)
2018–2019	RC Kouba	0	(0)
- * Club domestic league appearances and goals

Adlen Griche (Arabic: عدلان قريش; born 3 March 1979) is an Algerian former footballer.

== Career ==
On 21 June 2009 Griche signed a contract with Shabab Al-Ordon Al-Qadisiya.

== Honours ==
- Finalist of the Algerian Cup once with USM El Harrach in 2011
