= Abbas Mohamed Djallal Aïssaoui =

Algerian footballer (born 1986)

Personal information
- Full name: Abbas Mohamed Djallal Aïssaoui
- Date of birth: October 5, 1986 (age 40)
- Place of birth: El Bayadh, Algeria
- Position: Midfielder

Team information
- Current team: WA Tlemcen

Senior career*
Years	Team	Apps	(Gls)
2005–2008	ASO Chlef		
2008	CR Belouizdad		
2008–2010	USM El Harrach		
2010–2011	MC Oran	23	(2)
2011–2012	USM El Harrach	24	(4)
2012–2013	USM Bel-Abbès	17	(0)
2013	CRB Aïn Fakroun	5	(0)
2013–2014	ASM Oran		
2014–	WA Tlemcen		

International career^{‡}
2006–2007	Algeria U23	2	(0)
- * Club domestic league appearances and goals as of 00:00, 31 October 2011 (UTC) ‡ National team caps and goals as of 00:00, 31 October 2011 (UTC)

Abbas Mohamed Djallal Aïssaoui (born October 5, 1986, in El Bayadh) is an Algerian football player who is currently playing as a midfielder for WA Tlemcen in the Algerian Ligue Professionnelle 2.

== Club career ==
In July 2007, he was a handed a trial with Belgian club KSC Lokeren.
