= Karim Hendou =

Algerian footballer (born 1986)

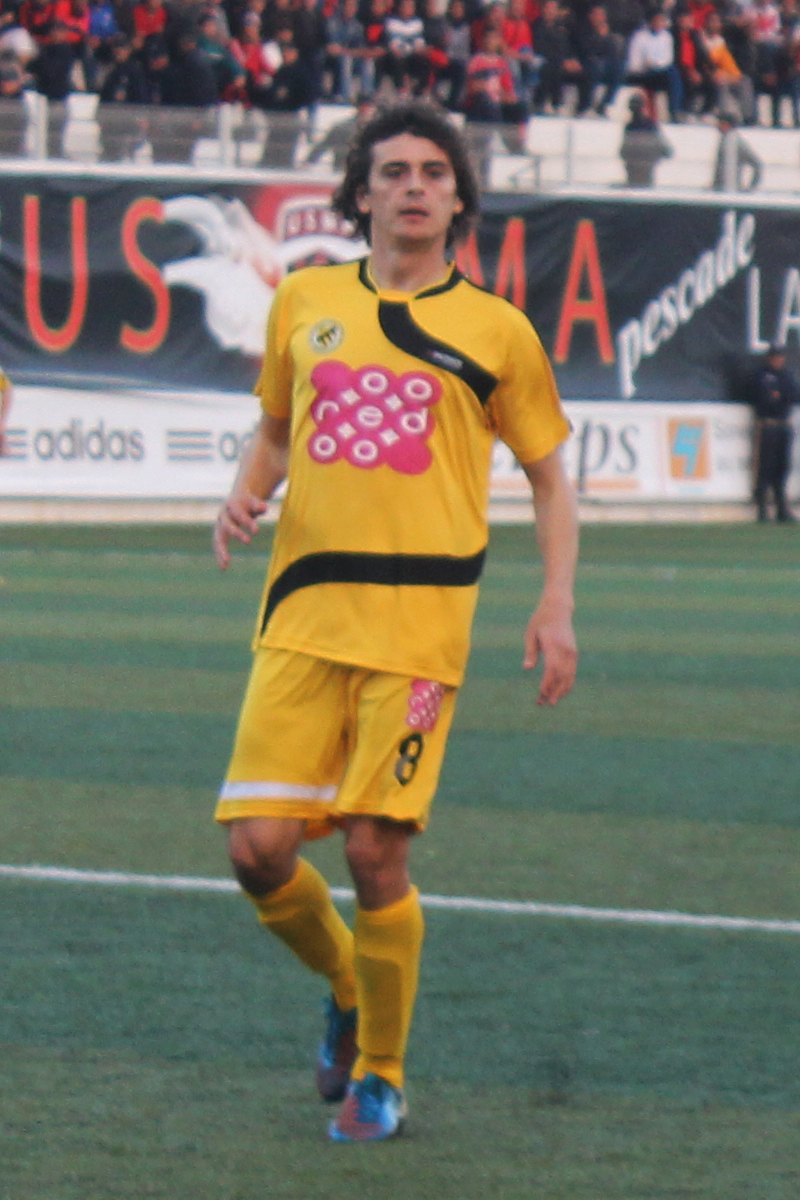
- Hendou with USM El Harrach in 2014

Personal information
- Date of birth: May 27, 1986 (age 40)
- Place of birth: Algiers, Algeria
- Height: 1.80 m (5 ft 11 in)
- Position: Midfielder

Team information
- Current team: JS Kabylie (assistant)

Youth career
- 2001–2003: Shakhtar Donetsk

Senior career*
Years	Team	Apps	(Gls)
2003–2006	Shakhtar Donetsk	0	(0)
2003–2005	→ Shakhtar-3 Donetsk	19	(2)
2004–2006	→ Shakhtar-2 Donetsk	22	(0)
2006–2007	Zorya Luhansk	0	(0)
2007–2008	Nyva Ternopil	1	(0)
2008–2009	JS El Biar	29	(12)
2009–2014	USM El Harrach	145	(3)
2014–2016	MC Alger	27	(0)
2016–2017	USM Bel-Abbès	9	(0)
2017	USM El Harrach	2	(0)
2017–2018	ASM Oran		

International career
2004	Ukraine U18	6	(0)
2009	Algeria A'	2	(0)
- * Club domestic league appearances and goals

Karim Hendou, also known as Karim Khendu, (Arabic: كريم هندو, Ukrainian: Карім Хенду; born May 27, 1986) is an Algerian former professional footballer who played as a midfielder. He is the current assistant coach of JS Kabylie.

== Personal life ==
Hendou was born in Algiers, Algeria to an Algerian father and a Ukrainian mother. His family moved to Ukraine when he was a child, and Hendou lived there for 12 years before moving back to Algeria to play for JS El Biar.

== Career ==
Hendou joined USM El Harrach in 2009.

In 2004, he was capped by Ukraine at the Under-18 level, making six appearances.

In 2009, he was called up to the Algerian A' national team and played in a friendly against JS Kabylie.

== Honours ==
USM El Harrach

- Algerian Cup runner-up: 2011
