= Koh Traoré =

Burkinabé-born Ivorian footballer

Personal information
- Full name: Koh Traoré
- Date of birth: 29 August 1989 (age 37)
- Place of birth: Ouagadougou, Burkina Faso
- Height: 1.83 m (6 ft 0 in)
- Position: Striker

Senior career*
Years	Team	Apps	(Gls)
2009	Étoile Filante		
2011	ES Sétif	3	(1)
2011–2012	WA Tlemcen	9	(1)
2013	Sabah FA	25	(18)
2014	Rail Club du Kadiogo		
2014	EGS Gafsa		
- * Club domestic league appearances and goals as of 00:00, 29 July 2014 (EST)

Koh Traoré (born 29 August 1989 in Ouagadougou) is a Burkinabé-born Ivory Coast football striker who plays for EGS Gafsa in the Tunisian Ligue Professionnelle 1.

== Club career ==
Traoré played for Etoile Filante in the Burkinabé Premier League. for a reported 30,000 Euros fee he moved to the Algerian side ES Setif and later to WA Tlemcen. He mutually agreed to leave WA Tlemcen and joined the Malaysian side Sabah FA for the 2013 Malaysia Premier League.

He scored his first hat-trick when Sabah FA drew 3–3 while on the match against PDRM FA and went on to score three more hat-tricks that season.

Traore finished the 2013 season at Sabah FA with 18 League Goals, which set a new record at the club.

After a half-season with Rail Club du Kadiogo, Traore signed for Tunisian side EGS Gafsa in July 2014.
