= Yassine Akkouche =

Algerian footballer (born 1984)

Personal information
- Full name: Yassine Akkouche
- Date of birth: July 28, 1984 (age 42)
- Place of birth: Akbou, Algeria
- Position: Forward

Team information
- Current team: CA Bordj Bou Arréridj

Senior career*
Years	Team	Apps	(Gls)
2008–2009	Olympique Akbou	30	(25)
2009–2010	JS Kabylie	22	(3)
2010–2011	MC Saïda	22	(5)
2011–	CA Bordj Bou Arréridj	0	(0)
- * Club domestic league appearances and goals as of 00:00, 23 August 2011 (UTC)

Yassine Akkouche, also known as Yacine Akkouche, (born July 28, 1984) is an Algerian footballer. He currently plays as a forward for CA Bordj Bou Arréridj in the Algerian Ligue Professionnelle 2.

== Career ==
In the summer of 2009, Akkouche joined JS Kabylie from ORB Akbou after an impressive season where he finished as the team's top scorer and being chosen as the best player. On August 28, 2009, he made his debut for JS Kabylie in a league game against NA Hussein Dey.
