= Amine Touahri =

Algerian footballer (born 1989)

Personal information
- Full name: Amine Touahri
- Date of birth: 12 February 1989 (age 37)
- Place of birth: Hussein Dey, Algiers Province, Algeria
- Position: Forward

Team information
- Current team: WA Boufarik

Senior career*
Years	Team	Apps	(Gls)
2008–2013	USM El Harrach	82	(7)
2013–2014	ES Sétif	17	(1)
2014–2015	NA Hussein Dey	19	(0)
2015–2016	RC Relizane	12	(0)
2016–2017	Khemis Miliana	?	(?)
2017	A Bou Saâda	?	(?)
2017–2018	US Monastir	2	(0)
2018–2019	RC Kouba	?	(0)
2019–	WA Boufarik	?	(0)

International career
	Algeria U23	14	(1)
- * Club domestic league appearances and goals as of 7 February 2018

Amine "Zenga" Touahri (born 12 February 1989) is an Algerian footballer who is currently playing as a forward for WA Boufarik.

== International career ==
Touahri was called up to participate in the 2010 UNAF U-23 Tournament. On 13 December 2010, he scored the sixth goal against the Cameroonian under 23 side. On November 16, 2011, he was selected as part of Algeria's squad for the 2011 CAF U-23 Championship in Morocco.

== Honours ==
- Finalist of the Algerian Cup once with USM El Harrach in 2011
