= Mohamed Boualem =

Algerian footballer (born 1987)

Personal information
- Full name: Mohamed Boualem
- Date of birth: August 28, 1987 (age 39)
- Place of birth: Oran, Algeria
- Position: Midfielder

Youth career
- –: RCG Oran
- –2007: ASM Oran

Senior career*
| Years | Team | Apps | (Gls) |
| 2007–2011 | ASM Oran | - | (-) |
| 2010–2011 | → USM El Harrach (loan) | 44 | (11) |
| 2011–2012 | USM Alger | 15 | (2) |

International career^{‡}
| 2010 | Algeria A' | 0 | |
- * Club domestic league appearances and goals as of 00:00, March 12, 2012 (UTC) ‡ National team caps and goals as of 00:00, March 12, 2012 (UTC)

Mohamed "Hamia" Boualem (born August 28, 1987) is an Algerian football player the former offensive midfielder of ASM Oran, USM El Harrach and USM Alger, put an end to his career in the inability to recover from an injury contracted in 2012.

== Personal ==
Boualem was born on August 28, 1987, in the city of Oran. He got his nickname, Hamia, from his father.

== Club career ==
Boualem started his career with his hometown club of RCG Oran and after with ASM Oran. In January 2010, he was loaned out to USM El Harrach for six months. In the summer of 2010, he was loaned out again to USM El Harrach, this time for one season. Almost three years after last playing for USM Alger, Mohamed "Hamia" Boualem has just ended his short football career. Boualem had made his last appearance in the Red and Black colors one afternoon in March 2012. It was on the 24th, during the match that had played against CS Constantine. Boualem had been substituted in the 76th minute of play and had not played again. Height of misfortune, with the multiple ailments that he frequently knew, the talented usmist was seriously injured during a training session.

== International career ==
On November 28, 2010, Boualem was called up to the Algeria A' national football team for a three-day training camp in Algiers. He was also preselected by head coach Abdelhak Benchikha in a group of 40 players for the 2011 African Championship of Nations. However, he did not make the final squad for the competition.

== Honours ==
- Finalist of the Algerian Cup once with USM El Harrach in 2011
