= Saïd Amara Stadium =

Sports venue in Saida, Algeria

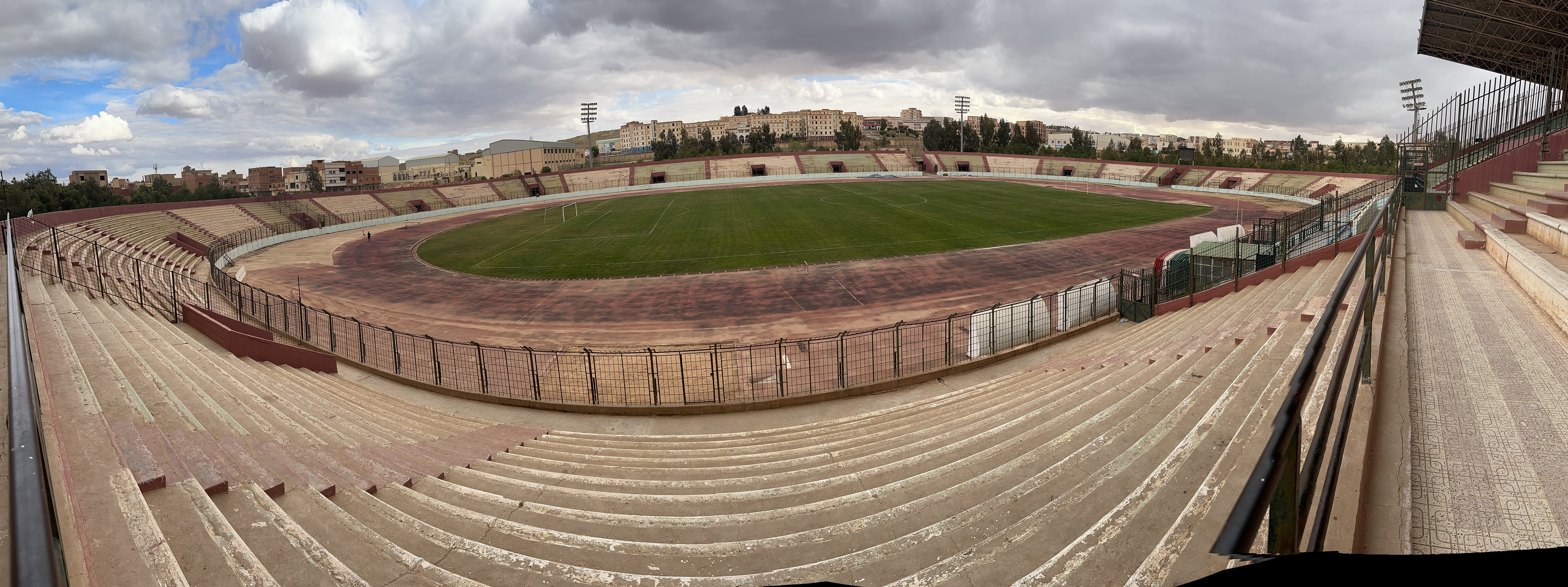
- Interactive map of Saïd Amara Stadium
- Full name: Stade Saïd Amara
- Former names: April 13, 1958 Stadium
- Location: Saida, Algeria
- Coordinates: 34°51′47.2″N 0°9′4.3″E
- Owner: APC of Saida
- Capacity: 25,000
- Surface: Grass

Construction
- Groundbreaking: 1989
- Built: 2005
- Opened: 2005

Tenant
- MC Saida

Saïd Amara Stadium (Arabic: ملعب سعيد عمارة) is a multi-use stadium in Saida, Algeria. It is currently used mostly for football matches. The stadium holds 25,000 people.

== History ==
It was named the 13 April 1958 Stadium, to celebrate the date of the creation of the FLN team. In 2020, when Saïd Amara died, LFP proposed that the stadium bear his name.
