= Salim Boumechra =

Algerian football player (born 1983)

Personal information
- Full name: Salim Boumechra
- Date of birth: 28 April 1983 (age 43)
- Place of birth: Oran, Algeria
- Positions: Midfielder; forward

Team information
- Current team: MC Oran
- Number: 10

Senior career*
Years	Team	Apps	(Gls)
2005–2008	ASM Oran	-	(-)
2008–2010	MC Alger	-	(-)
2010–2011	USM El Harrach	26	(11)
2011–2012	USM Alger	19	(1)
2012–	MC Oran	0	(0)
- * Club domestic league appearances and goals as of 00:00, 25 June 2012 (UTC)

Salim Boumechra (born 28 April 1983) is an Algerian football player who is currently playing for MC Oran in the Algerian Ligue Professionnelle 1.

== Club career ==
In December 2007, he was linked with a move to Ligue 1 clubs SM Caen and RC Lens. However, an injury prevented either deal from going through. Boumechra signed with MC Alger in the summer of 2008, joining them on a free transfer from ASM Oran.

== Honours ==
- Won the Algerian Ligue Professionnelle 1 once with MC Alger in 2010
- Finalist of the Algerian Cup once with USM El Harrach in 2011
