= 2010–11 Algerian Cup =

- Stade du 5 Juillet hosted the final

Tournament details
- Country: Algeria

Final positions
- Champions: JS Kabylie (5th title)
- Runners-up: USM El Harrach

Tournament statistics
- Top goal scorer: Farès Hamiti (6 goals)

The 2010–11 Algerian Cup was the 47th edition of the Algerian Cup. JS Kabylie won the Cup by defeating USM El Harrach 1–0 in the final with a goal from Farès Hamiti in the 13th minute. It was the fifth time in the club's history that JS Kabylie won the Algerian Cup.

On 7 December 2010, the draw for the Round of 64 was held.

== Schedule ==
Round	Date	Number of fixtures	Clubs
Round of 64	28 December – 1 January	32	64 → 32
Round of 32	4–5 March	16	32 → 16
Round of 16	15 March	8	16 → 8
Quarterfinals	8–9 April	4	8 → 4
Semifinals	18 April	2	4 → 2
Final	1 May	1	2 → 1

== Round of 64 ==
Tie no	Home team	Score	Away team
1	ES Sétif	2–0	CRB Merine
2	ASO Chlef	2–0	WA Tlemcen
3	ARB Ghriss	0–0 (p)	CMB Thénia
4	CR Bendaoud	1–2	NA Hussein Dey
5	OMR El Annasser	0–1	NTS Tadamoun Souf
6	Paradou AC	1–0	IRB El Hadjar
7	USB Hassi R’mel	0–1 (a.e.t)	MC Mekhadma
8	USM Bel-Abbès	2–0	Olympique de Médéa
9	AS Khroub	1–3	MO Béjaïa
10	US Biskra	1–0	MB Constantine
11	US Chaouia	2–0	Hamra Annaba
12	US Tébessa	1–0	GC Ain Sefra
13	CS Constantine	1–3	MC Oran
14	USM El Harrach	4–1	CS Sig
15	CRB Sendjas	0–1	CR Belouizdad
16	CA Bordj Bou Arreridj	1–1 (p)	Hydra AC
17	USM Blida	5–0	RUDS Batna
18	JS Kabylie	2–0	IRB Sedrata
19	AB Mérouana	0–0 (p)	USM Annaba
20	ES Mostaganem	2–0	FC Frenda
21	AC Arbaâ	2–1 (a.e.t.)	RC Kouba
22	IRB Robah	4–0	CRB Ain Ouessera
23	Entente de Collo	1–4	ES Berrouaghia
24	MC Saïda	0–0 (p	USM Alger
25	AS Ain M'lila	0–0 (p)	JSM Bejaïa
26	ASM Oran	2–1	CRB Ain Turck
27	NARB Réghaïa	0–0 (p)	JS Saoura
28	MO Constantine	1–2	CRB Hennaya
29	MC Alger	2–1	IRB Tiaret
30	US Doucen	0–2	MC El Eulma
31	USM Aïn Beïda	2–1 (a.e.t.)	USF Bord Bou Arreridj
32	NRB Chréa	0–5	CA Batna

== Round of 32 ==
Tie no	Home team	Score	Away team
1	JSM Béjaïa	2–0	USM Blida
2	MC Mekhadma	0–0 (2–4 p)	MC Alger
3	ES Sétif	2–1	NA Hussein Dey
4	MC Saïda	1–0	USM Bel-Abbès
5	ES Mostaganem	0–1	JS Kabylie
6	ASO Chlef	1–0	CA Bordj Bou Arreridj
7	CRB Hennaya	1–1 (4–2 p)	ES Berrouaghia
8	MC El Eulma	2–0	AC Arbaâ
9	ASM Oran	0–1	MC Oran
10	ARB Ghriss	0–1	NTS Tadamoun Souf
11	CA Batna	0–0 (5–4 p)	Paradou AC
12	MO Béjaïa	1–0	US Tébessa
13	AB Merouana	0–0 (5–4 p)	US Chaouia
14	USM El Harrach	2–1 (a.e.t)	NARB Réghaïa
15	IRB Robah	1–1 (7–8 p)	CR Belouizdad
16	USM Aïn Beïda	0–0 (4–3 p)	US Biskra

== Round of 16 ==
On 8 March 2011, the draw for the third and fourth round of the Algerian Cup were held at a ceremony at the Sheraton in Algiers. The matches of the Round of 16 are scheduled to be played on 15 March 2011.

Tie no	Home team	Score	Away team
1	JSM Béjaïa	0–0 (4–5 p.)	MC Alger
2	AB Mérouana	2–1	CRB Hennaya
3	MC Saïda	1–0	ASO Chlef
4	CR Belouizdad	3–0	NTS Tadamoun Souf
5	ES Sétif	2–0	CA Batna
6	MO Béjaïa	0–1	USM El Harrach
7	JS Kabylie	2–1 (a.e.t)	MC El Eulma
8	USM Aïn Beïda	1–3 (a.e.t)	MC Oran

=== Matches ===
25 March 2011

JSM Béjaïa	0–0 (a.e.t)	MC Alger
Penalties
	4–5

15 March 2011

AB Mérouana	2–1	CRB Hennaya
Mahelaoui 3'; Rahmoune 34'		Khalfa 70'

15 March 2011

MC Saïda	1–0	ASO Chlef
Laïd Madouni 38'

15 March 2011

CR Belouizdad	3–0	NTS Tadamoun Souf
Youcef Saïbi 23', 38'; Amar Ammour 85'

Stade 20 Août 1955, Algiers
Referee: Ghorbal

15 March 2011

ES Sétif	2–0	CA Batna
Hocine Metref 52'; Moustapha Djallit 61'

15 March 2011

MO Béjaïa	0–1	USM El Harrach
		Ayoub Latreche 90'

15 March 2011

JS Kabylie	2–1 (a.e.t)	MC El Eulma
Farès Hamiti 45', 91'		Toufik Benamokrane 34'

Stade 1er Novembre, Tizi Ouzou
Referee: Sahraoui

15 March 2011

USM Aïn Beïda	1–3 (a.e.t)	MC Oran
Emcehn 90+1'		Youcef Belaïli 89', 95'; Sid Ahmed Aouedj 115'

Ali Hamdi Stadium, Aïn Beïda

== Quarter-finals ==
The quarter-finals are scheduled to be played on 8 and 9 April.

Tie no	Home team	Score	Away team
1	AB Mérouana	0–1 (a.e.t)	ES Sétif
2	MC Alger	0–0 (4–5 p.)	MC Oran
3	USM El Harrach	1–0	MC Saïda
4	JS Kabylie	4–2	CR Belouizdad

=== Matches ===
8 April 2011
15:30

USM El Harrach	1–0	MC Saïda
Lounés Bendahmane 90' (o.g.)	Report

Stade 1er Novembre, Algiers
Referee: Bahloul

8 April 2011
17:00

MC Alger	0–0 (a.e.t)	MC Oran
Penalties
	4–5

Rouiba Stadium, Rouiba
Referee: Mial

9 April 2011
15:00

JS Kabylie	4–2	CR Belouizdad
Farès Hamiti 15', 43'; Saad Tedjar 50' (pen.); Sofiane Younès 77'		Youcef Saïbi 40'; Islam Slimani 86'

Stade 1er Novembre (Tizi Ouzou), Tizi Ouzou
Referee: Abid Cherif

9 April 2011
15:00

AB Mérouana	0–1 (a.e.t)	ES Sétif
		Koh Traoré 91'

Stade Abderrahmane Bensaci, Merouana
Referee: Babou

== Semi-finals ==
The draw for the semi-finals was held on 12 April, with the two semi-finals scheduled for 18 April.

Tie no	Home team	Score	Away team
1	USM El Harrach	3–2	ES Sétif
2	JS Kabylie	2–1	MC Oran

=== Matches ===
18 April 2011
15:30

USM El Harrach	3–2	ES Sétif
Salim Boumechra 26', 70' (pen.); Mohamed Boualem 87'		Smaïl Diss 13'; Koh Traoré 43'

Stade 1er Novembre, Algiers
Referee: Mokhtar Amalou

18 April 2011
18:00

JS Kabylie	2–1	MC Oran
Sofiane Khelili 8'; Farès Hamiti 83'		Seddik Berradja 22'

Stade 1er Novembre, Tizi Ouzou
Referee: Mohamed Bichari

== Final ==
Tie no	Home team	Score	Away team
1	USM El Harrach	0–1	JS Kabylie

=== Details ===
1 May 2011

USM El Harrach	0–1	JS Kabylie
		Farès Hamiti 12'

Stade 5 Juillet 1962, Algiers
Attendance: 60,000
Referee: Mehdi Abid Charef

== Top scorers ==
Rank	Scorer	Club	Goals
1	(Algeria) Farès Hamiti	JS Kabylie	6
2	(Algeria) Youcef Belaïli	MC Oran	4
2	(Algeria) Youcef Saïbi	CR Belouizdad	4
