= 2012–13 CA Batna season =

CA Batna
2012–13 season
- Chairman: Farid Nezzar
- Head coach: Abdelkrim Latrèche (until 16 August 2012); Rachid Bouarrata (from 22 August 2012) (until 10 October 2012); Toufik Rouabah (from 10 October 2012) (until 28 December 2012); Ali Fergani (from 5 January 2013)
- Stadium: November 1, 1954 Stadium
- Ligue 1: 14th
- Algerian Cup: Round of 32
- Top goalscorer: League: Adel El Hadi (4); All: Adel El Hadi (4)

In the 2012–13 season, CA Batna is competing in the Ligue 1 for the 22nd season, as well as the Algerian Cup.

== Squad list ==
Players and squad numbers last updated on 18 November 2010.
Note: Flags indicate national team as has been defined under FIFA eligibility rules. Players may hold more than one non-FIFA nationality.

No.	Nat.	Position	Name	Date of birth (age)	Signed from
Goalkeepers
Defenders
Midfielders
Forwards

== Competitions ==
=== Overview ===
Competition	Record								Started round	Final position / round	First match	Last match
Competition	G	W	D	L	GF	GA	GD	Win %	Started round	Final position / round	First match	Last match
Ligue 1	30	6	8	16	20	46	−26	20.00	—N/a	14th	15 September 2012	21 May 2013
Algerian Cup	2	1	0	1	2	1	+1	50.00	Round of 64	Round of 32	15 December 2012	28 December 2012
Total	32	7	8	17	22	47	−25	21.88				

Updated to match played 9 May 2017
Source: Competitions

== League table ==
Pos	Team	Pld	W	D	L	GF	GA	GD	Pts	Qualification or relegation
12	MC Oran	30	8	10	12	33	41	−8	34	
13	CA Bordj Bou Arréridj	30	7	12	11	20	26	−6	33	
14	CA Batna (R)	30	6	8	16	20	46	−26	26	Relegation to Ligue Professionnelle 2
15	WA Tlemcen (R)	30	6	6	18	19	43	−24	24	Relegation to Ligue Professionnelle 2
16	USM Bel-Abbès (R)	30	5	7	18	18	45	−27	22	Relegation to Ligue Professionnelle 2

Updated to match(es) played on 21 May 2013. Source: DZFoot
Rules for classification: 1) points; 2) head-to-head points; 3) head-to-head goal difference; 4) goal difference; 5) total goals; 6) fairplay ranking; 7) playoff.
(R) Relegated

=== Results summary ===
Overall								Home						Away					
Pld	W	D	L	GF	GA	GD	Pts	W	D	L	GF	GA	GD	W	D	L	GF	GA	GD
30	6	8	16	20	46	−26	26	5	4	6	16	22	−6	1	4	10	4	24	−20

Last updated: 29 December 2014.
Source: Competitive matches

=== Results by round ===
Round	1	2	3	4	5	6	7	8	9	10	11	12	13	14	15	16	17	18	19	20	21	22	23	24	25	26	27	28	29	30
Ground	H	A	H	H	A	H	A	H	A	H	A	H	A	H	A	A	H	A	A	H	A	H	A	H	A	H	A	H	A	H
Result	D	L	W	L	L	W	L	D	D	L	L	D	L	L	L	D	L	D	L	L	W	W	L	W	D	W	L	L	L	D
Position	6	12	10	12	14	11	12	12	12	12	13	13	15	15	16	15	16	16	16	16	16	16	16	16	14	14	14	14	14	14

Source: Competitive matches
A = Away; H = Home; W = Win; D = Draw; L = Loss

=== Matches ===
15 September 2012 Round 1	CA Batna	1–1	CA Bordj Bou Arreridj	Batna
18:00	Boulaïnceur 64'	Report	32' Ammour	Stadium: November 1, 1954 Stadium; Referee: Merzak Halalchi

18 September 2012 Round 2	ES Sétif	6–0	CA Batna	Sétif
18:00	Aoudia 20', 57'; Ziti 28'; El Okbi 30'; Gourmi 62'; Tiouli 71'	Report		Stadium: Stade 8 Mai 1945; Referee: Mokhtar Amalou

22 September 2012 Round 3	CA Batna	2–1	MC El Eulma	Batna
18:00	Boulaïnceur 32'; Bensaci 68'	Report	58' (pen.) Tiaïba	Stadium: November 1, 1954 Stadium; Referee: Redouane Necib

29 September 2012 Round 4	CA Batna	0–3	USM Alger	Batna
18:00		Report	Seguer 12'; Gasmi 82'; Feham 90' (pen.)	Stadium: Stade 1er Novembre 1954; Referee: Mohamed Benouza

6 October 2012 Round 5	USM El Harrach	2–0	CA Batna	Algiers
16:00	El Amali 2'; Tatem 14'	Report		Stadium: Stade 1er Novembre 1954; Referee: Mohamed Saïdi

16 October 2012 Round 6	CA Batna	1–0	WA Tlemcen	Batna
18:00	Boulaïnceur 31'	Report		Stadium: Stade 1er Novembre 1954; Referee: Mohamed Bichari

20 October 2012 Round 7	USM Bel-Abbès	1–0	CA Batna	Sidi Bel Abbès
17:45	Hamiche 11' (pen.)	Report		Stadium: Stade 24 Fevrier 1956; Referee: Merzak Halalchi

23 October 2012 Round 8	CA Batna	0–0	JS Saoura	Batna
16:00		Report		Stadium: November 1, 1954 Stadium; Referee: Djamel Haimoudi

2 November 2012 Round 9	ASO Chlef	1–1	CA Batna	Chlef
17:45	Messaoud 66'	Report	15' El Hadi	Stadium: Stade Mohamed Boumezrag; Referee: Amine Sekhraoui

10 November 2012 Round 10	CA Batna	0–2	JSM Béjaïa	Batna
15:00		Report	27' Bahloul; 83' Zerara	Stadium: November 1, 1954 Stadium; Referee: Mohamed Bichari

16 November 2012 Round 11	MC Oran	3–1	CA Batna	Oran
16:00	Dagoulou 27', 79'; Aouedj 82'	Report	85' El Hadi	Stadium: Ahmed Zabana Stadium; Referee: Mokhtar Amalou

23 November 2012 Round 12	CA Batna	2–2	CR Belouizdad	Batna
15:00	Beloufa 21'; Hadjidj 90+2' (pen.)	Report	83' Benaldjia; 90+4' Amroune	Stadium: November 1, 1954 Stadium; Referee: Mohamed Ghorbal

1 December 2012 Round 13	CS Constantine	2–0	CA Batna	Constantine
17:45	Bezzaz 35'; Djilali 39'	Report		Stadium: Stade Mohamed Hamlaoui; Referee: Farouk Mial

8 December 2012 Round 14	CA Batna	0–1	MC Alger	Batna
15:00		Report	35' (pen.) Djallit	Stadium: November 1, 1954 Stadium; Referee: Mohamed Benouza

12 December 2012 Round 15	JS Kabylie	1–0	CA Batna	Tizi Ouzou
15:00	Mokdad 25'	Report		Stadium: Stade du 1er Novembre 1954; Referee: Mohamed Bachir

15 January 2013 Round 16	CA Bordj Bou Arréridj	0–0	CA Batna	Bordj Bou Arréridj
18:00		Report		Stadium: Stade 20 Août 1955; Referee: Mohamed Saïdi

19 January 2013 Round 17	CA Batna	1–2	ES Sétif	Batna
15:00	Merazka 79'	Report	11' Tiouli; 15' Madouni	Stadium: November 1, 1954 Stadium; Referee: Youssef Zerrouki

19 February 2013 Round 18	MC El Eulma	0–0	CA Batna	El Eulma
15:00		Report		Stadium: Stade Messaoud Zougar; Referee: Merzak Halalchi

2 February 2013 Round 19	USM Alger	2–0	CA Batna	Algiers
18:00	Betrouni 66'; Gasmi 90'	Report		Stadium: Stade Omar Hamadi; Referee: Redouane Necib

9 February 2013 Round 20	CA Batna	2–3	USM El Harrach	Algiers
15:00	El Hadi 26'; Fezzani 43' (pen.)	Report	36', 90+1' Bounedjah; 80' Belkaroui	Stadium: Stade 1er Novembre 1954; Referee: Mohamed Bachir

16 February 2013 Round 21	WA Tlemcen	0–1	CA Batna	Tlemcen
15:00		Report	20' Fergani	Stadium: Stade Akid Lotfi; Referee: Mokhtar Amalou

23 February 2013 Round 22	CA Batna	1–0	USM Bel-Abbès	Batna
15:00	Bouraba 38'	Report		Stadium: November 1, 1954 Stadium; Referee: Farouk Houasnia

9 March 2013 Round 23	JS Saoura	2–0	CA Batna	Béchar
15:00	Terbah 10'; Beldjilali 52'	Report		Stadium: Stade 20 Août 1955; Referee: Mohamed Ghorbal

19 March 2013 Round 24	CA Batna	1–0	ASO Chlef	Batna
17:00	El Hadi 82'	Report		Stadium: November 1, 1954 Stadium; Referee: Abderrazek Hallalchi

16 April 2013 Round 25	JSM Béjaïa	1–1	CA Batna	Béjaïa
19:00	Zerara 37' (pen.)	Report	56' Benayada	Stadium: Stade de l'Unité Maghrébine; Referee: Mohamed Benouza

20 April 2013 Round 26	CA Batna	2–1	MC Oran	Batna
15:00	Merazka 65', 83'	Report	85' Benyettou	Stadium: November 1, 1954 Stadium; Referee: Mokhtar Amalou

4 May 2013 Round 27	CR Belouizdad	2–0	CA Batna	Belouizdad
17:00	Kherbache 26'; Benayada 90+4' (o.g.)	Report		Stadium: Stade 20 Août 1955; Referee: Farouk Mial

11 May 2013 Round 28	CA Batna	1–4	CS Constantine	Batna
17:00	Ngomo 22' (o.g.)	Report	15', 41' Hadiouche; 85' Ferhat; 88' Tiaiba	Stadium: November 1, 1954 Stadium; Referee: Mohamed Bichari

18 May 2013 Round 29	MC Alger	1–0	CA Batna	Algiers
17:00	Bouguèche 60'	Report		Stadium: July 5, 1962 Stadium; Referee: Mohamed Saïdi

21 May 2013 Round 30	CA Batna	2–2	JS Kabylie	Batna
16:00	Bitam 75'; Bendoukha 90'	Report	1', 60' Messadia	Stadium: November 1, 1954 Stadium; Referee: Boussadia

== Algerian Cup ==
15 December 2012 Round of 64	WM Tebessa	0–2	CA Batna	Tébessa
14:00		Report	14' Chermat; 88' Benayada	Stadium: March 4, 1956 Stadium; Referee: Hosna

28 December 2012 Round of 32	CA Batna	0–1	MO Béjaïa	Batna
15:00		Report	39' Djabali	Stadium: November 1, 1954 Stadium; Referee: Abderrezzak Arab

== Squad information ==
=== Playing statistics ===
No.	Pos	Nat	Player	Total		Ligue 1		Algerian Cup	
No.	Pos	Nat	Player	Apps	Goals	Apps	Goals	Apps	Goals
Goalkeepers
	GK	(Algeria) ALG	Salah Sahraoui	1	0	1	0	0	0
	GK	(Algeria) ALG	Yacine Babouche	14	0	14	0	0	0
1	GK	(Algeria) ALG	Oussama Methazem	12	0	12	0	0	0
12	GK	(Algeria) ALG	Lyes Aissani	3	0	3	0	0	0
Defenders
15	DF	(Algeria) ALG	Nacerdine Bensaci	9	1	9	1	0	0
19	DF	(Algeria) ALG	Mourad Boudjelida	12	0	12	0	0	0
5	DF	(Algeria) ALG	Abderrezak Bitam	3	1	3	1	0	0
31	DF	(Algeria) ALG	Abdelkader Benayada	23	1	23	1	0	0
	DF	(Algeria) ALG	Amar Boutria	12	0	12	0	0	0
	DF	(Algeria) ALG	Billel Boulediab	9	0	9	0	0	0
	DF	(Algeria) ALG	Hamza Bouhidel	1	0	1	0	0	0
24	DF	(Algeria) ALG	Naoufel Ghassiri	21	0	21	0	0	0
	DF	(Algeria) ALG	Chouaib Debbih	13	0	13	0	0	0
	DF	(Algeria) ALG	Islam Boukmacha	7	0	7	0	0	0
2	DF	(Algeria) ALG	Hamouda Bendoukha	11	1	11	1	0	0
Midfielders
8	MF	(Algeria) ALG	Mohamed Saidi	16	0	16	0	0	0
7	MF	(Algeria) ALG	Ali Daira	20	0	20	0	0	0
18	MF	(Algeria) ALG	Walid Chermat	7	0	7	0	0	0
10	MF	(Togo) TOG	Sapol Mani	20	0	20	0	0	0
	MF	(Algeria) ALG	Hamza Heriat	26	0	26	0	0	0
22	MF	(Algeria) ALG	Amine Elaid Fezzani	17	1	17	1	0	0
	MF	(Algeria) ALG	Imad Bella	16	0	16	0	0	0
	MF	(Algeria) ALG	Aghiles Fergani	8	1	8	1	0	0
	MF	(Algeria) ALG	Messaoudène	2	0	2	0	0	0
Forwards
17	FW	(Algeria) ALG	Djabir Naamoune	6	0	6	0	0	0
	FW	(Algeria) ALG	Adel El Hadi	25	4	25	4	0	0
26	FW	(Algeria) ALG	Mohamed Lokmane Hadjidj	20	1	20	1	0	0
32	FW	(Algeria) ALG	Tahar Bouraba	13	1	13	1	0	0
	FW	(Democratic Republic of the Congo) COD	Lelo Mbele	4	0	4	0	0	0
	FW	(Algeria) ALG	Hichem Merazka	16	3	16	3	0	0
25	FW	(Algeria) ALG	Mohamed Beloufa	7	1	7	1	0	0
	FW	(Algeria) ALG	Haïm	1	0	1	0	0	0
Players transferred out during the season
	MF	(Algeria) ALG	Said Bouchouk	12	0	12	0	0	0
	FW	(Algeria) ALG	Rafik Boulanseur	14	3	14	3	0	0

Last updated: 3 December 2017
Source: fr.soccerway.com

=== Goalscorers ===
Includes all competitive matches. The list is sorted alphabetically by surname when total goals are equal.

No.	Nat.	Player	Pos.	L 1	AC	TOTAL
	(Algeria)	Adel El Hadi	FW	4	0	4
	(Algeria)	Rafik Boulanseur	FW	3	0	3
	(Algeria)	Hichem Merazka	FW	3	0	3
31	(Algeria)	Abdelkader Benayada	DF	1	1	2
26	(Algeria)	Mohamed Lokmane Hadjidj	FW	1	0	1
32	(Algeria)	Tahar Bouraba	FW	1	0	1
25	(Algeria)	Mohamed Beloufa	FW	1	0	1
22	(Algeria)	Amine Elaid Fezzani	MF	1	0	1
	(Algeria)	Aghiles Fergani	MF	1	0	1
18	(Algeria)	Walid Chermat	MF	0	1	1
15	(Algeria)	Nacerdine Bensaci	DF	1	0	1
5	(Algeria)	Abderrezak Bitam	DF	1	0	1
2	(Algeria)	Hamouda Bendoukha	DF	1	0	1
Own Goals				1	0	1
Totals				20	2	22

== Transfers ==
=== In ===
Date	Pos	Player	From club	Transfer fee	Source
13 June 2012	DF	(Algeria) Abderrezak Bitam	JS Kabylie	Undisclosed	
30 June 2012	MF	(Algeria) Said Bouchouk	(Saudi Arabia) Al-Qadisiyah	Return from loan	
1 July 2012	GK	(Algeria) Salah Sahraoui	MC El Eulma	Undisclosed	
1 July 2012	GK	(Algeria) Oussama Methazem	USM Khenchela	Undisclosed	
1 July 2012	GK	(Algeria) Lyes Aissani	MO Béjaïa	Undisclosed	
1 July 2012	DF	(Algeria) Abdelkader Benayada	MO Constantine	Undisclosed	
1 July 2012	DF	(Algeria) Chouaib Debbih	AS Ain M'lila	Undisclosed	
1 July 2012	MF	(Algeria) Walid Chermat	MO Constantine	Undisclosed	
1 July 2012	DF	(Algeria) Naoufel Ghassiri	US Biskra	Undisclosed	
1 July 2012	FW	(Algeria) Djabir Naamoune	USM Annaba	Undisclosed	
1 July 2012	FW	(Algeria) Mohamed Lokmane Hadjidj	MSP Batna	Undisclosed	
1 August 2012	FW	(Algeria) Rafik Boulanseur	JSM Béjaïa	Undisclosed	
1 August 2012	DF	(Algeria) Nacerdine Bensaci	CS Constantine	Undisclosed	
1 January 2013	DF	(Algeria) Islam Boukmacha	MC Saïda	Undisclosed	
1 January 2013	MF	(Algeria) (France) Aghiles Fergani	(France) Bourges 18	Undisclosed	
1 January 2013	DF	(Algeria) Hamouda Bendoukha	ES Mostaganem	Undisclosed	
2 January 2013	FW	(Algeria) Tahar Bouraba	MC Alger	Loan	
2 January 2013	FW	(Democratic Republic of the Congo) Lelo Mbele	MC Alger	Loan	

=== Out ===
Date	Pos	Player	To club	Transfer fee	Source
3 June 2012	DF	(Algeria) Youcef Benamara	USM Alger	Free transfer	
1 July 2012	DF	(Algeria) Nassim Oussalah	MC El Eulma	Undisclosed	
1 January 2013	MF	(Algeria) Said Bouchouk	JS Kabylie	Undisclosed	
5 January 2013	MF	(Algeria) Abdelmalek Bitam	USM El Harrach	Undisclosed	
7 January 2013	FW	(Algeria) Rafik Boulanseur	JS Kabylie	Undisclosed	
