= 2011–12 MC Saïda season =

MC Saïda
2011–12 season
- Chairman: Mohamed Khaldi
- Head coach: Toufik Rouabah (until 28 January 2012); Mustapha Heddane (from 28 January 2012) (until 15 March 2012)
- Stadium: April 13, 1958 Stadium
- Ligue 1: 16th
- Algerian Cup: Round of 16
- Top goalscorer: League: Abdenour Hadiouche (8); All: Abdenour Hadiouche (11)

In the 2011–12 season, MC Saïda is competing in the Ligue 1 for the 5th season, as well as the Algerian Cup. They will be competing in Ligue 1, and the Algerian Cup.

== Squad list ==
Players and squad numbers last updated on 18 November 2011.
Note: Flags indicate national team as has been defined under FIFA eligibility rules. Players may hold more than one non-FIFA nationality.

No.	Nat.	Position	Name	Date of Birth (Age)	Signed from
Goalkeepers
Defenders
Midfielders
Forwards

== Competitions ==
=== Overview ===
Competition	Record								Started round	Final position / round	First match	Last match
Competition	G	W	D	L	GF	GA	GD	Win %	Started round	Final position / round	First match	Last match
Ligue 1	30	6	6	18	28	46	−18	20.00	—N/a	16th	10 September 2011	19 May 2012
Algerian Cup	3	2	1	0	6	1	+5	66.67	Round of 64	Round of 16	30 December 2011	9 March 2012
Total	33	8	7	18	34	47	−13	24.24				

Updated to match played 3 June 2019
Source: Competitions

== League table ==
Pos	Team	Pld	W	D	L	GF	GA	GD	Pts	Qualification or relegation
12	CS Constantine	30	8	12	10	35	42	−7	36	
13	MC Oran	30	9	8	13	38	51	−13	35	
14	AS Khroub (R)	30	7	10	13	23	46	−23	31	Relegation to Ligue Professionnelle 2
15	NA Hussein Dey (R)	30	5	11	14	29	39	−10	26	Relegation to Ligue Professionnelle 2
16	MC Saïda (R)	30	6	6	18	28	46	−18	24	Relegation to Ligue Professionnelle 2

Updated to match(es) played on 19 April 2018. Source: DZFoot
Rules for classification: 1) points; 2) head-to-head points; 3) head-to-head goal difference; 4) goal difference; 5) total goals; 6) fairplay ranking; 7) playoff.
(R) Relegated

=== Results summary ===
Overall								Home						Away					
Pld	W	D	L	GF	GA	GD	Pts	W	D	L	GF	GA	GD	W	D	L	GF	GA	GD
30	6	6	18	28	46	−18	24	6	5	4	20	11	+9	0	1	14	8	35	−27

Last updated: 22 April 2018.
Source: Competitive matches

=== Results by round ===
Round	1	2	3	4	5	6	7	8	9	10	11	12	13	14	15	16	17	18	19	20	21	22	23	24	25	26	27	28	29	30
Ground	H	A	H	A	H	A	H	A	H	A	H	H	A	H	A	A	H	A	H	A	H	A	H	A	H	A	A	H	A	H
Result	W	L	L	L	W	L	D	D	W	L	L	D	L	D	L	L	D	L	W	L	W	L	W	L	D	L	L	L	L	L
Position	1	4	11	13	12	13	12	12	12	13	14	13	14	14	14	14	15	15	15	15	14	14	14	15	15	15	15	15	16	16

Source: Competitive matches
A = Away; H = Home; W = Win; D = Draw; L = Loss

=== Matches ===
Win Draw Loss

10 September 2011 Round 1	MC Saïda	2–0	ASO Chlef	Saida
16:00	Hadiouche 84'; Cheraïtia 90+1'	Report		Stadium: April 13, 1958 Stadium; Referee: Farouk Mial

17 September 2011 Round 2	CA Batna	1–0	MC Saïda	Batna
19:00	Merazka 43'	Report		Stadium: Mustapha Seffouhi Stadium; Referee: Rafik Achouri

24 January 2011 Round 3	MC Saïda	0–1	USM El Harrach	Saida
16:00		Report	Djarbou 25'	Stadium: April 13, 1958 Stadium; Referee: Redouane Necib

1 October 2011 Round 4	AS Khroub	1–0	MC Saïda	El Khroub
18:00	Mesfar 46' (pen.)	Report		Stadium: Abed Hamdani Stadium; Referee: Khaled Saâdi

15 October 2011 Round 5	MC Saïda	1–0	MC El Eulma	Saida
18:00	Madouni 35'	Report		Stadium: April 13, 1958 Stadium; Referee: Merzak Halalchi

22 October 2011 Round 6	CR Belouizdad	3–1	MC Saïda	Belouizdad
19:00	Slimani 7' (pen.); Rebih 34'; Bourakba 55'	Report	Hadiouche 9'	Stadium: Stade 20 Août 1955; Referee: Farouk Mial

29 October 2011 Round 7	MC Saïd	0–0	MC Alger	Saida
18:00		Report		Stadium: April 13, 1958 Stadium; Referee: Boubekeur Zouaoui

4 November 2011 Round 8	WA Tlemcen	2–2	MC Saïda	Tlemcen
17:00	Sameur 18'; Belarbi 36'	Report	Hadiouche 33'; Abdellaoui 45+2'	Stadium: Stade Akid Lotfi; Referee: Farouk Houasnia

19 November 2011 Round 9	MC Saïda	2–0	MC Oran	Saida
18:00	Nehari 67'; Saâdi 90'	Report		Stadium: April 13, 1958 Stadium; Referee: Mohamed Sahraoui

22 November 2011 Round 10	USM Alger	3–2	MC Saïda	Algiers
18:00	Boumechra 49'; Hemitti 59'; Laïfaoui 90'	Report	11', 78' Hadiouche	Stadium: Stade Omar Hammadi; Referee: Rafik Achouri

26 November 2011 Round 11	MC Saïda	1–2	JS Kabylie	Saida
18:00	Saâdi 90+2'	Report	Boulemdaïs 7'; Hanifi 23'	Stadium: April 13, 1958 Stadium; Referee: Habibatni

3 December 2011 Round 12	MC Saïda	1–1	CS Constantine	Saida
15:00	Sayah 36'	Report	Mekkaoui 55'	Stadium: April 13, 1958 Stadium; Referee: Mokhtar Amalou

10 December 2011 Round 13	ES Sétif	3–1	MC Saïda	Sétif
18:00	Aoudia 19'; Megueni 27'; Ghazali 35'	Report	Hadiouche 90+3'	Stadium: Stade 8 Mai 1945; Referee: Farouk Houasnia

17 December 2011 Round 14	MC Saïda	1–1	NA Hussein Dey	Saida
15:00	Saâdi 40'	Report	El Okbi 47'	Stadium: April 13, 1958 Stadium; Referee: Said Aouina

24 December 2011 Round 15	JSM Béjaïa	3–1	MC Saida	Béjaïa
15:00	Yabeun 29'; Gasmi 38', 77'	Report	Hadiouche 47'	Stadium: Stade de l'Unité Maghrébine; Referee: Redouane Necib

21 January 2012 Round 16	ASO Chlef	1–0	MC Saïda	Chlef
17:45	Seguer 70'	Report		Stadium: Stade Mohamed Boumezrag; Referee: Mehdi Abid Charef

28 January 2012 Round 17	MC Saïda	1–1	CA Batna	Saida
15:00	Bagayoko 20'	Report	El Hadi 2'	Stadium: April 13, 1958 Stadium; Referee: Merzak Halalchi

31 January 2012 Round 18	USM El Harrach	2–0	MC Saïda	Algiers
15:00	Bounedjah 10'; Bennai 88'	Report		Stadium: Stade 1er Novembre 1954; Referee: Farid Bahloul

4 February 2012 Round 19	MC Saïda	6–1	AS Khroub	Saida
15:00	Sayah 16'; Madouni 31', 53', 73'; Teguedi 84'; Zaoui 90+3'	Report	Belaïli 58'	Stadium: April 13, 1958 Stadium; Referee: Mohamed Babou

18 February 2012 Round 20	MC El Eulma	1–0	MC Saïda	El Eulma
15:00	Diarra 36'	Report		Stadium: Stade Messaoud Zougar; Referee: Sofiane Bousseter

3 March 2012 Round 21	MC Saïda	2–0	CR Belouizdad	Saida
15:00	Hadiouche 13'; Mebarakou 64'	Report		Stadium: April 13, 1958 Stadium; Referee: Ramzi Habibatni

17 March 2012 Round 22	MC Alger	2–0	MC Saïda	Algiers
17:45	Djallit 43', 46'	Report		Stadium: Stade Omar Hammadi; Referee: Farouk Mial

24 March 2012 Round 23	MC Saïda	1–0	WA Tlemcen	Saida
14:00	Zaoui 15'	Report		Stadium: April 13, 1958 Stadium; Referee: Rafik Achouri

7 April 2012 Round 24	MC Oran	4–0	MC Saïda	Oran
15:30	El Bahari 18'; Aouedj 25'; Boussehaba 50' (pen.); Belaïli 82'	Report		Stadium: Stade Ahmed Zabana; Referee: Farouk Houasnia

14 April 2012 Round 25	MC Saïda	1–1	USM Alger	Saïda
15:00	Madouni 63'	Report	90+6' Ouznadji	Stadium: Stade 13 Avril 1958; Referee: Boubekeur Zouaoui

28 April 2012 Round 26	JS Kabylie	4–0	MC Saïda	Tizi Ouzou
15:00	Hemani 20', 61'; Hanifi 46'; Remache 76'	Report		Stadium: Stade du 1er Novembre 1954; Referee: Farid Bahloul

5 May 2012 Round 27	CS Constantine	2–1	MC Saïda	Constantine
15:00	Eguakun 41'; Bezzaz 49' (pen.)	Report	Saâdi 32'	Stadium: Stade Mohamed Hamlaoui; Referee: Merzak Halalchi

8 May 2012 Round 28	MC Saïda	0–1	ES Sétif	Saida
16:00		Report	Benmoussa 47' (pen.)	Stadium: April 13, 1958 Stadium; Referee: Mohamed Bichari

15 May 2012 Round 29	NA Hussein Dey	3–0	MC Saïda	Hussein Dey
18:00	Derrardja 61', 80'; Boussaïd 81'	Report		Stadium: Zioui Brothers Stadium; Referee: Mokhtar Amalou

19 May 2012 Round 30	MC Saïda	1–2	JSM Béjaïa	Saida
17:00	Zaoui 57'	Report	Gasmi 21'; Bachiri 81'	Stadium: April 13, 1958 Stadium; Attendance: 0 (close doors); Referee: Rafik Achouri

== Algerian Cup ==
31 September 2011 Round of 64	IRB Nezla	0–4	MC Saïda	?
14:00		Report	Hadiouche 18', 69' (pen.); Sayah 51', 61'	Stadium: ? Referee: ?

24 February 2012 Round of 32	MC Saïda	2–1	RC Relizane	Saida
15:00	Hadiouche 53'; Madouni 72'	Report	Daouadji 26'	Stadium: April 13, 1958 Stadium; Referee: Bachir, Benmansour, Abid

9 March 2012 Round of 16	MC Saïda	0–0 (4–5 p)	CR Belouizdad	Saida
15:00		Report		Stadium: April 13, 1958 Stadium; Referee: Necib, Boulekhel, Maghlout

== Squad information ==
=== Playing statistics ===
No.	Pos	Nat	Player	Total		Ligue 1		Algerian Cup	
No.	Pos	Nat	Player	Apps	Goals	Apps	Goals	Apps	Goals
Goalkeepers
1	GK	(Algeria) ALG	Merouane Kial	25	0	24	0	1	0
31	GK	(Algeria) ALG	Seddik Bouhadda	8	0	7	0	1	0
Defenders
	DF	(Algeria) ALG	Abdelaziz Hamedi	9	0	8	0	1	0
29	DF	(Algeria) ALG	Kada El Hadjari	17	0	15	0	2	0
15	DF	(Algeria) ALG	Abdeslam Mebarakou	14	1	12	1	2	0
5	DF	(Algeria) ALG	Youcef Nehari	18	1	16	1	2	0
14	DF	(Algeria) ALG	Samir Belkheir	9	0	9	0	0	0
2	DF	(Algeria) ALG	Abdelkrim Taibi	9	0	9	0	0	0
19	DF	(Algeria) ALG	Mohamed Oukrif	4	0	4	0	0	0
4	DF	(Algeria) ALG	Nabil Bentabet	11	0	11	0	0	0
30	DF	(Mali) MLI	Sekou Bagayoko	27	1	25	1	2	0
	DF	(Algeria) ALG	Sahraoui	1	0	1	0	0	0
	DF	(Algeria) ALG	Mohamed Amine Fellouli	5	0	5	0	0	0
	DF	(Algeria) ALG	Benatallah	1	0	1	0	0	0
Midfielders
26	MF	(Mauritania) MTN	Dahmed Ould Teguedi	12	1	11	1	1	0
10	MF	(Algeria) ALG	Saïd Sayah	15	2	15	2	0	0
	MF	(Algeria) ALG	Tayeb Berramla	9	0	9	0	0	0
6	MF	(Algeria) ALG	Nourredine Abdellaoui	10	1	10	1	0	0
21	MF	(Algeria) ALG	Abdelhak Atek	20	0	19	0	1	0
22	MF	(Algeria) ALG	Mohamed Saadi	24	4	23	4	1	0
18	MF	(Algeria) ALG	Toufik Addadi	26	0	25	0	1	0
28	MF	(Algeria) ALG	Zakaria Sahnoun	1	0	1	0	0	0
8	MF	(Algeria) ALG	Abdelouahab Guenifi	19	0	17	0	2	0
	MF	(Algeria) ALG	Ourahmoune	1	0	1	0	0	0
Forwards
	FW	(Algeria) ALG	Salah Ben Djoudi Benabdellah	1	0	1	0	0	0
17	FW	(Algeria) ALG	Mohamed Cheraïtia	25	1	23	1	2	0
9	FW	(Algeria) ALG	Abdenour Hadiouche	24	9	23	8	1	1
23	FW	(Algeria) ALG	Mohamed Zaoui	22	3	20	3	2	0
24	FW	(Algeria) ALG	Laïd Madouni	24	6	22	5	2	1
	FW	(Algeria) ALG	Tahar Bouraba	11	0	9	0	2	0
3	FW	(Algeria) ALG	Chafik Mokdad	10	0	9	0	1	0
7	FW	(Algeria) ALG	Abdessamad Habbache	7	0	7	0	0	0
20	FW	(Mali) MLI	Mohamed Marko Camara	6	0	6	0	0	0
	FW	(Algeria) ALG	Amine Soudani	5	0	5	0	0	0
	FW	(Algeria) ALG	Abdelhadi Nabet	6	0	6	0	0	0
Players transferred out during the season

Last updated: 25 November 2017
Source: fr.soccerway.com

== Transfers ==
=== In ===
Date	Pos	Player	From club	Transfer fee	Source
1 July 2011	GK	(Algeria) Seddik Bouhadda	MC Alger	Free transfer	
1 July 2011	DF	(Algeria) Nabil Bentabet	MC Oran	Free transfer	
1 July 2011	DF	(Algeria) Mohamed Oukrif	Olympique de Médéa	Free transfer	
1 July 2011	DF	(Mali) Sekou Bagayoko	(Libya) Olympic Zaouia	Free transfer	
1 July 2011	DF	(Algeria) Abdelkrim Taibi	MO Constantine	Free transfer	
1 July 2011	MF	(Algeria) Zakaria Sahnoun	MC Oran	Free transfer	
1 July 2011	MF	(Algeria) Abdessamad Habbache	USM Alger	Free transfer	
1 July 2011	MF	(Algeria) Abdelouahab Guenifi	MO Béjaïa	Free transfer	
1 July 2011	FW	(Guinea) Mohamed Marko Camara	(Guinea) Fello Star	Free transfer	
1 January 2012	MF	(Algeria) Tayeb Berramla	MC Alger	Free transfer	
1 January 2012	FW	(Algeria) Tahar Bouraba	JSM Béjaïa	Free transfer	
1 January 2012	MF	(Mauritania) Dahmed Ould Teguedi	CA Batna	Free transfer	
1 January 2012	DF	(Algeria) Abdelaziz Hamedi	AS Khroub	Free transfer	
