= 2011–12 JSM Béjaïa season =

JSM Béjaïa
2011–12 season
- Chairman: Boualem Tiab
- Head coach: Fouad Bouali (until 2 January 2012); Alain Michel (from 4 January 2012)
- Stadium: Stade de l'Unité Maghrébine
- Ligue 1: Runners-up
- Algerian Cup: Round of 64
- Champions League: First round
- Top goalscorer: League: Ahmed Gasmi (11); All: Ahmed Gasmi (12)
Home colours	Away colours	Third colours

In the 2011–12 season, JSM Béjaïa competed in the Ligue 1 for the 12th season, as well as the Algerian Cup. They competed in Ligue 1, the Algerian Cup and the Champions League.

== Squad list ==
Players and squad numbers last updated on 18 November 2011.
Note: Flags indicate national team as has been defined under FIFA eligibility rules. Players may hold more than one non-FIFA nationality.

No.	Nat.	Position	Name	Date of birth (age)	Signed from
Goalkeepers
Defenders
Midfielders
Forwards

== Competitions ==
=== Overview ===
Competition	Record								Started round	Final position / round	First match	Last match
Competition	G	W	D	L	GF	GA	GD	Win %	Started round	Final position / round	First match	Last match
Ligue 1	30	15	8	7	40	26	+14	50.00	—N/a	Runners-up	10 September 2011	19 May 2012
Algerian Cup	1	0	0	1	1	2	−1	0.00	Round of 64		30 December 2011	
Champions League	4	1	1	2	4	6	−2	25.00	Preliminary round	First round	18 February 2012	10 April 2012
Total	0	0	0	0	0	0	+0	—				

Updated to match played 9 May 2017
Source: Competitions

== League table ==
Pos	Team	Pld	W	D	L	GF	GA	GD	Pts	Qualification or relegation
1	ES Sétif (C)	30	16	5	9	53	40	+13	53	Qualification for the Champions League preliminary round
2	JSM Béjaïa	30	15	8	7	40	26	+14	53	Qualification for the Champions League preliminary round
3	USM Alger	30	15	7	8	37	25	+12	52	Qualification for the Confederation Cup preliminary round
4	CR Belouizdad	30	13	9	8	34	28	+6	48	
5	ASO Chlef	30	14	5	11	41	34	+7	47	

Updated to match(es) played on 19 April 2018. Source: DZFoot
Rules for classification: 1) points; 2) head-to-head points; 3) head-to-head goal difference; 4) goal difference; 5) total goals; 6) fairplay ranking; 7) playoff.
(C) Champions

=== Results summary ===
Overall								Home						Away					
Pld	W	D	L	GF	GA	GD	Pts	W	D	L	GF	GA	GD	W	D	L	GF	GA	GD
30	15	8	7	40	26	+14	53	10	3	2	24	9	+15	5	5	5	16	17	−1

Last updated: 29 December 2014.
Source: Competitive matches

=== Results by round ===
Round	1	2	3	4	5	6	7	8	9	10	11	12	13	14	15	16	17	18	19	20	21	22	23	24	25	26	27	28	29	30
Ground	A	H	A	A	H	A	H	A	H	A	H	A	H	A	H	H	A	H	H	A	H	A	H	A	H	A	H	A	H	A
Result	D	W	W	L	W	D	D	D	D	W	D	L	W	L	W	W	L	L	W	D	W	L	W	W	W	D	L	W	W	W
Position	9	3	3	6	3	4	4	5	5	3	6	8	6	8	5	5	6	7	5	6	4	6	5	4	2	2	3	3	2	2

Source: Competitive matches
A = Away; H = Home; W = Win; D = Draw; L = Loss

=== Matches ===
10 September 2011 Round 1	CS Constantine	0–0	JSM Béjaïa	Constantine
19:00		Report		Stadium: Stade Mohamed Hamlaoui; Referee: Boubekeur Zouaoui

17 September 2011 Round 2	JSM Béjaïa	1–0	NA Hussein Dey	Béjaïa
19:00	Yabeun 69'	Report		Stadium: Stade de l'Unité Maghrébine; Referee: Farid Bahloul

24 September 2011 Round 3	ES Sétif	1–2	JSM Béjaïa	Sétif
21:45	Djabou 89'	Report	Yabeun 32'; Boucherit 60'	Stadium: Stade 8 Mai 1945; Referee: Mehdi Abid Charef

1 October 2011 Round 4	ASO Chlef	2–1	JSM Béjaïa	Chlef
18:00	Seguer 61'; Ali Hadji 88'	Report	Aoures 90'	Stadium: Stade Mohamed Boumezrag; Referee: Mohamed Bichari

15 October 2011 Round 5	JSM Béjaïa	1–0	MC Alger	Béjaïa
18:00	Boulaïnceur 50'	Report		Stadium: Stade de l'Unité Maghrébine; Referee: Rafik Achouri

22 October 2011 Round 6	CA Batna	0–0	JSM Béjaïa	Batna
16:00		Report		Stadium: Mustapha Seffouhi Stadium; Referee: Djamel Haimoudi

29 October 2011 Round 7	JSM Béjaïa	0–0	WA Tlemcen	Béjaïa
18:00		Report		Stadium: Stade de l'Unité Maghrébine; Referee: Habibatni

4 November 2011 Round 8	AS Khroub	0–0	JSM Béjaïa	El Khroub
18:00		Report		Stadium: Abed Hamdani Stadium; Referee: Redouane Necib

19 November 2011 Round 9	JSM Béjaïa	1–1	MC El Eulma	Béjaïa
18:00	Bachiri 21'	Report	Belakhdar 45+1'	Stadium: Stade de l'Unité Maghrébine; Referee: Boubekeur Zouaoui

22 November 2011 Round 10	CR Belouizdad	1–2	JSM Béjaïa	Belouizdad
18:00	Bourakba 90+1' (pen.)	Report	Megateli 74'; Boulaïnceur 78'	Stadium: Stade 20 Août 1955; Referee: Mehdi Abid Charef

26 November 2011 Round 11	JSM Béjaïa	1–1	USM El Harrach	Béjaïa
15:00	Benchaïra 31'	Report	Bounedjah 34'	Stadium: Stade de l'Unité Maghrébine; Referee: Mohamed Benouza

3 December 2011 Round 12	MC Oran	1–0	JSM Béjaïa	Oran
15:00	El Bahari 44'	Report		Stadium: Ahmed Zabana Stadium; Referee: Rafik Achouri

10 December 2011 Round 13	JSM Béjaïa	2–0	USM Alger	Béjaïa
15:00	Djallit 84'; Yabeun 85'	Report		Stadium: Stade de l'Unité Maghrébine; Referee: Sofiane Bousseter

17 December 2011 Round 14	JS Kabylie	1–0	JSM Béjaïa	Tizi Ouzou
15:00	Hanifi 59'	Report		Stadium: Stade du 1er Novembre 1954; Referee: Mokhtar Amalou

24 December 2011 Round 15	JSM Béjaïa	3–1	MC Saida	Béjaïa
15:00	Yabeun 29'; Gasmi 38', 77'	Report	Hadiouche 47'	Stadium: Stade de l'Unité Maghrébine; Referee: Redouane Necib

21 January 2012 Round 16	JSM Béjaïa	3–0	CS Constantine	Béjaïa
15:00	Gasmi 49', 66'; Belakhdar 88'	Report		Stadium: Stade de l'Unité Maghrébine; Referee: Mohamed Bichari

28 January 2012 Round 17	NA Hussein Dey	1–0	JSM Béjaïa	Hussein Dey
15:00	Merbah 75'	Report		Stadium: Zioui Brothers Stadium; Referee: Boubekeur Zouaoui

31 January 2012 Round 18	JSM Béjaïa	2–3	ES Sétif	Béjaïa
15:00	Yélémou 40'; Belakhdar 67'	Report	Djabou 45+2', 55'; Aoudia 90+2'	Stadium: Stade de l'Unité Maghrébine; Referee: Mokhtar Amalou

4 February 2012 Round 19	JSM Béjaïa	1–0	ASO Chlef	Béjaïa
15:00	Gasmi 34'	Report		Stadium: Stade de l'Unité Maghrébine; Referee: Rafik Achouri

11 February 2012 Round 20	MC Alger	1–1	JSM Béjaïa	Algiers
17:45	Sayah 76'	Report	Yélémou 38'	Stadium: Stade Omar Hammadi; Referee: Farouk Houasnia

25 February 2012 Round 21	JSM Béjaïa	1–0	CA Batna	Béjaïa
15:00	Belakhdar 73'	Report		Stadium: Stade de l'Unité Maghrébine; Referee: Bouaza Chenane

17 March 2012 Round 22	WA Tlemcen	2–0	JSM Béjaïa	Tlemcen
15:00	Zouaoui 12'; Andria 90+4'	Report		Stadium: Stade Akid Lotfi; Referee: Rafik Achouri

27 March 2012 Round 23	JSM Béjaïa	2–0	AS Khroub	Béjaïa
16:00	Gasmi 20'; Derrag 70'	Report		Stadium: Stade de l'Unité Maghrébine; Referee: Mohamed Amine Ghorbal

31 March 2012 Round 24	MC El Eulma	1–2	JSM Béjaïa	El Eulma
15:00	Bouaïcha 67' (pen.)	Report	Zerara 56'; Boulaïnceur 88'	Stadium: Stade Messaoud Zougar; Attendance: 0 (close doors); Referee: Merzak Halalchi

14 April 2012 Round 25	JSM Béjaïa	4–0	CR Belouizdad	Béjaïa
16:00	Aït Fergane 9'; Gasmi 12' (pen.); Boulaïnceur 31'; Benchaïra 83'	Report		Stadium: Stade de l'Unité Maghrébine; Referee: Mohamed Benouza

28 April 2012 Round 26	USM El Harrach	2–2	JSM Béjaïa	Algiers
16:00	Kerim 22'; Touahri 46'	Report	Gasmi 72' (pen.); Derrag 82'	Stadium: Stade 1er Novembre 1954; Referee: Redouane Necib

5 May 2012 Round 27	JSM Béjaïa	1–3	MC Oran	Béjaïa
15:00	Ouali 86'	Report	Belaïli 45+2'; Dagoulou 69'; Feddal 82'	Stadium: Stade de l'Unité Maghrébine; Referee: Mehdi Abid Charef

12 May 2012 Round 28	USM Alger	3–4	JSM Béjaïa	Algiers
17:45	Daham 31' (pen.), 42' (pen.), 64' (pen.)	Report	10' Derrag; 20' Bachiri; 45' Gasmi; 86' Megateli	Stadium: Stade Omar Hammadi; Referee: Farouk Houasnia

15 May 2012 Round 29	JSM Béjaïa	1–0	JS Kabylie	Béjaïa
15:00	Gasmi 63' (pen.)	Report		Stadium: Stade de l'Unité Maghrébine; Attendance: 0 (close doors); Referee: Merzak Halalchi

19 May 2012 Round 30	MC Saïda	1–2	JSM Béjaïa	Saida
17:00	Zaoui 57'	Report	Gasmi 21'; Bachiri 81'	Stadium: April 13, 1958 Stadium; Attendance: 0 (close doors); Referee: Rafik Achouri

== Algerian Cup ==
30 December 2011 Round of 64	MB Hassasna	2–1	JSM Béjaïa	Saida
14:30	Kateb 14'; Kaïd 21'	Repport	61' Belekhder	Stadium: April 13, 1958 Stadium; Referee: Mohamed Sahraoui

== Champions League ==
=== Preliminary round ===
18 February 2012	Foullah Edifice (Chad)	0–0	(Algeria) JSM Béjaïa	N'Djamena
15:00 UTC+01:00		Report		Stadium: Stade Omnisports Idriss Mahamat Ouya; Referee: Aurélien Juenkou Wandji (Cameroon)

2 March 2012	JSM Béjaïa (Algeria)	3–1	(Chad) Foullah Edifice	Béjaïa
16:00 UTC+01:00	Yélémou 22', 68'; Boulaïnceur 35'	Report	Aboubakar 80'	Stadium: Stade de l'Unité Maghrébine; Referee: Mohamed Farouk Mahmoud (Egypt)

=== First round ===
23 March 2012	JSM Béjaïa (Algeria)	1–2	(Ivory Coast) AFAD Djékanou	Béjaïa
16:00 UTC+01:00	Gasmi 55'	Report	Kadjo 5'; Allègne 43'	Stadium: Stade de l'Unité Maghrébine; Referee: Bakary Papa Gassama (Gambia)

7 April 2012	AFAD Djékanou (Ivory Coast)	3–0	(Algeria) JSM Béjaïa	Abidjan
15:30 UTC±00:00	Amoro 15' (pen.), 60'; Ahmed 75'	Report		Stadium: Stade Robert Champroux; Referee: Eric Otogo Castane (Gabon)

== Squad information ==
=== Playing statistics ===
No.	Pos	Nat	Player	Total		Ligue 1		Algerian Cup		Champions League	
No.	Pos	Nat	Player	Apps	Goals	Apps	Goals	Apps	Goals	Apps	Goals
Goalkeepers
12	GK	(Algeria) ALG	Yacine Djebarat	7	0	6	0	1	0	0	0
16	GK	(Algeria) ALG	Cédric Si Mohamed	29	0	25	0	0	0	4	0
Defenders
13	DF	(Algeria) ALG	Brahim Zafour	30	0	25	0	1	0	4	0
18	DF	(Algeria) ALG	Amine Megateli	28	2	24	2	1	0	3	0
28	DF	(Algeria) ALG	Amer Belakhdar	28	4	23	3	1	1	4	0
5	DF	(Algeria) ALG	Adel Maïza	25	0	20	0	1	0	4	0
21	DF	(Algeria) ALG	Redouane Bachiri	25	4	24	4	1	0	0	0
29	DF	(Algeria) ALG	Amine Boulahia	14	0	13	0	0	0	1	0
15	DF	(Algeria) ALG	Zidane Mebarakou	8	0	7	0	0	0	1	0
	DF	(Algeria) ALG	Larbi Hammouche	9	0	8	0	0	0	1	0
Midfielders
26	MF	(Algeria) ALG	Toufik Zerara	15	1	14	1	0	0	1	0
14	MF	(Algeria) ALG	Mehdi Kacem	22	0	18	0	1	0	3	0
30	MF	(Algeria) ALG	Azzedine Benchaïra	22	1	18	1	0	0	4	0
9	MF	(Algeria) ALG	Antar Boucherit	26	1	22	1	1	0	3	0
6	MF	(Algeria) ALG	Nassim Hamlaoui	12	0	11	0	1	0	0	0
18	MF	(Algeria) ALG	Tayeb Maroci	28	0	24	0	0	0	4	0
	MF	(Algeria) ALG	Mohamed Nadir Ziane	1	0	1	0	0	0	0	0
7	MF	(Algeria) ALG	Billal Ouali	29	1	24	1	1	0	4	0
38	MF	(Algeria) ALG	Nabil Aït Fergane	7	1	7	1	0	0	0	0
Forwards
10	FW	(Algeria) ALG	Mohamed Derrag	10	3	9	3	0	0	1	0
8	FW	(Algeria) ALG	Ahmed Gasmi	24	12	21	11	0	0	3	1
26	FW	(Algeria) ALG	Moustapha Djallit	14	1	13	1	1	0	0	0
17	FW	(Algeria) ALG	Rafik Boulaïnceur	22	5	19	4	1	0	2	1
23	FW	(Algeria) ALG	Mohamed Lamine Aoures	7	1	5	1	1	0	1	0
22	FW	(Algeria) ALG	Tahar Bouraba	6	0	5	0	1	0	0	0
25	FW	(Cameroon) CMR	William Yabeun	21	4	18	4	0	0	3	0
22	FW	(Burkina Faso) BFA	Ernest Yélémou	10	4	6	2	0	0	4	2
Players transferred out during the season

Last updated: 24 November 2017
Source: fr.soccerway.com

== Transfers ==
=== In ===
Date	Pos	Player	From club	Transfer fee	Source
1 July 2011	DF	(Algeria) Redouane Bachiri	(Algeria) WA Tlemcen	Free transfer	
1 July 2011	DF	(Algeria) Amine Boulahia	(Algeria) WA Tlemcen	Free transfer	
1 July 2011	MF	(Algeria) Azzedine Benchaïra	(Algeria) CA Bordj Bou Arréridj	Free transfer	
1 July 2011	FW	(Cameroon) William Yabeun	(Northern Cyprus) Mağusa TG	Free transfer	
21 July 2011	FW	(Algeria) Moustapha Djallit	(Algeria) ES Sétif	Free transfer	
25 July 2011	FW	(Algeria) Mohamed Derrag	(Algeria) MC Alger	Free transfer	
12 January 2012	MF	(Algeria) Toufik Zerara	(France) SR Colmar	Free transfer	
12 January 2012	FW	(Burkina Faso) Ernest Yélémou	(Burkina Faso) USFA Ouagadougou	Free transfer	

=== Out ===
Date	Pos	Player	To club	Transfer fee	Source
13 July 2011	DF	(Algeria) Mohamed Rabie Meftah	(Algeria) USM Alger	Free transfer	
10 July 2011	FW	(Cameroon) Yannick N'Djeng	(Tunisia) Espérance ST	700,000 €	
