= 2012–13 CS Constantine season =

CS Constantine
2012–13 season
- Owner: Tassili Airlines (from 8 October 2012)
- Chairman: Mohamed Boulhabib
- Head coach: Roger Lemerre (from 14 July 2012)
- Stadium: Stade Mohamed Hamlaoui
- Ligue 1: 3rd
- Algerian Cup: Quarter-final
- Top goalscorer: League: Hamza Boulemdaïs (10); All: Hamza Boulemdaïs (13)

In the 2012–13 season, CS Constantine competed in the Ligue 1 for the 17th season, as well as the Algerian Cup. On July 13, Roger Lemerre signed a one-year coaching contract, with an option for an additional year. According to CS Constantine's investment manager, Mohamed Boulhabib, the former France national team coach is expected to begin his work on the eve of a friendly match against OGC Nice on July 28 in Constantine.

== Squad list ==
Players and squad numbers last updated on 18 November 2010.
Note: Flags indicate national team as has been defined under FIFA eligibility rules. Players may hold more than one non-FIFA nationality.

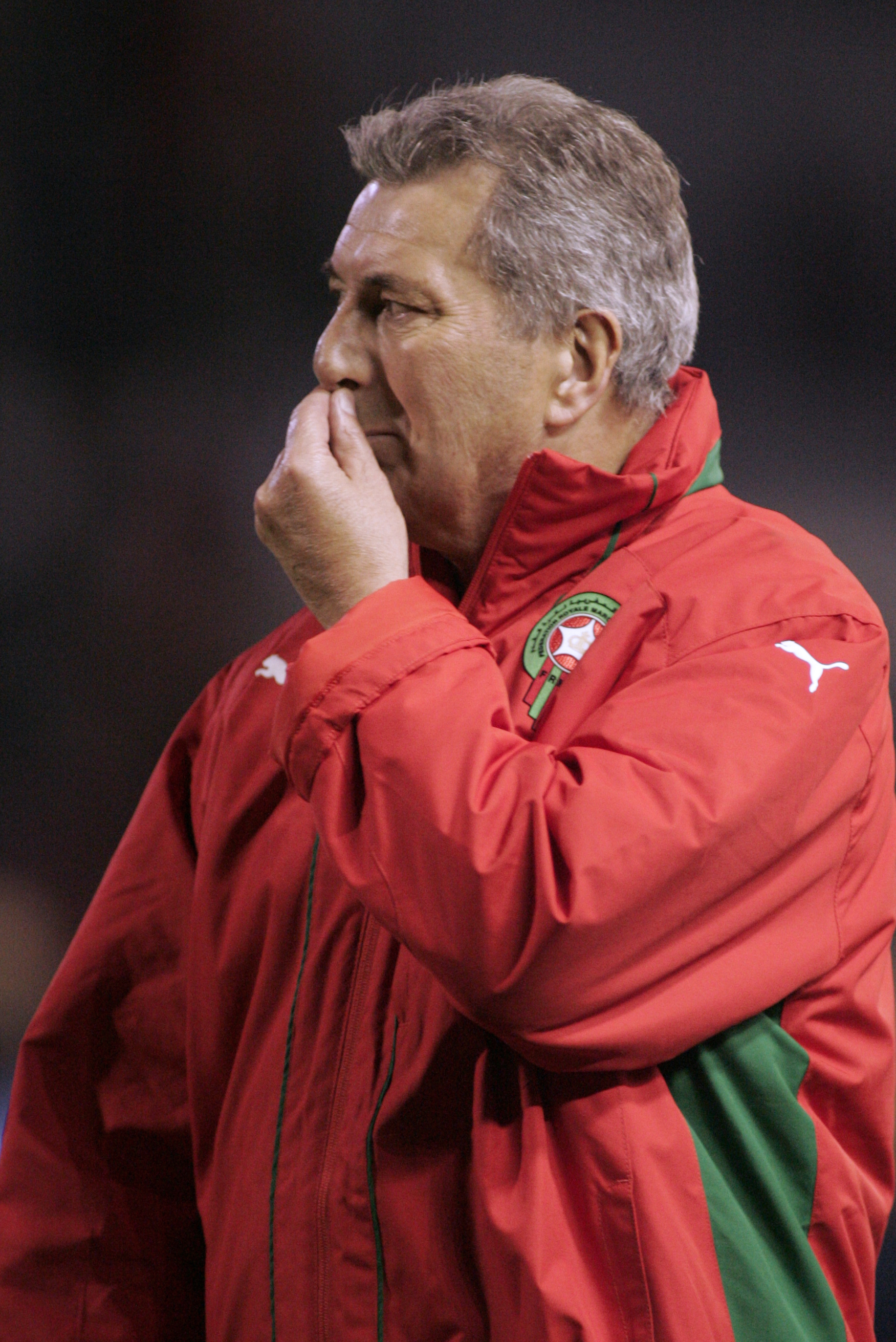
Lemerre team coach this season.

No.	Nat.	Name	Position	Date of birth (age)	Signed from
Goalkeepers
16	(Algeria)	Lounès Gaouaoui	GK	28 September 1977 (aged 34)	(Algeria) AS Khroub
1	(Algeria)	Abderaouf Natèche	GK	16 October 1982 (aged 29)	(Algeria) NA Hussein Dey
92	(France)	Cyrille Boukhit	GK	16 January 1992 (aged 20)	(France) Rodez AF
	(Algeria)	Mohamed Seghir Ferradji	GK	22 August 1975 (aged 37)	(Algeria) CA Bordj Bou Arréridj
Defenders
29	(Algeria)	Abderraouf Zarabi	LB	26 March 1979 (aged 33)	(Algeria) JS Kabylie
5	(Algeria)	Youcef Nehari	CB	1 June 1984 (aged 28)	(Algeria) MC Saida
46	(Algeria)	Abdelkader Messaoudi	CB	15 June 1986 (aged 26)	(Algeria) USM Annaba
21	(Algeria)	Yahia Djilali	CB	14 March 1978 (aged 34)	(Algeria) AS Khroub
2	(Algeria)	Amine Boulahia	RB	3 February 1987 (aged 25)	(Algeria) JSM Béjaïa
28	(Algeria)	Amer Belakhdar	LB	20 January 1980 (aged 32)	(Algeria) JSM Béjaïa
9	(Algeria)	Adlen Griche	CB	3 March 1979 (aged 33)	(Algeria) USM El Harrach
Midfielders
4	(Algeria)	Yazid Mansouri	CM	25 February 1978 (aged 34)	(Qatar) Al-Sailiya SC
6	(Cameroon)	Gilles Ngomo	DM	23 August 1987 (aged 25)	(Algeria) AS Khroub
8	(Algeria)	Karim Nait Yahia	RM	19 December 1980 (aged 31)	(Algeria) AS Khroub
17	(Algeria)	Reda Benhadj Djillali	DM	31 May 1978 (aged 34)	(Saudi Arabia) Najran SC
86	(Algeria)	Bilal Bahloul	LM	28 March 1986 (aged 26)	(Algeria) JSM Béjaïa
20	(Algeria)	Fouad Allag	DM	17 April 1985 (aged 27)	(Algeria) NA Hussein Dey
10	(Algeria)	Karim Benounes	AM	9 February 1984 (aged 28)	(Hungary) Egri FC
15	(Algeria)	Antar Boucherit	DM	18 December 1983 (aged 28)	(Algeria) JSM Béjaïa
77	(Algeria)	Yacine Bezzaz (C.)	LM	10 July 1981 (aged 31)	(Algeria) USM Alger
26	(Algeria)	Aziz Tafer	DM	17 June 1984 (aged 28)	(Romania) Gloria Buzău
Forwards
7	(Algeria)	Ayoub Ferhat	RW	17 July 1987 (aged 25)	(Algeria) MO Constantine
11	(Algeria)	Mohamed Tiaïba	ST	26 July 1988 (aged 24)	(Algeria) MC El Eulma
14	(Algeria)	Hamza Boulemdaïs	ST	22 November 1982 (aged 29)	(Algeria) JS Kabylie
25	(Algeria)	Nabil Hemani	ST	1 September 1979 (aged 33)	(Algeria) JS Kabylie
19	(Algeria)	Abdenour Hadiouche	ST	30 December 1984 (aged 27)	(Algeria) JS Kabylie
14	(Algeria)	Mehdi Kerrouche	ST	11 October 1985 (aged 26)	(England) Swindon Town

== Transfers ==
=== In ===
==== Summer ====
Date	Pos	Player	Moving from	Fee	Source
25 June 2012	DF	(Algeria) Youcef Nehari	MC Saïda	Undisclosed	
25 June 2012	GK	(Algeria) Abderaouf Natèche	NA Hussein Dey	Undisclosed	
25 June 2012	DF	(Algeria) Abdelkader Messaoudi	USM Annaba	Undisclosed	
25 June 2012	MF	(Algeria) Antar Boucherit	JSM Béjaïa	Undisclosed	
26 June 2012	FW	(Algeria) Hamza Boulemdaïs	JS Kabylie	Undisclosed	
29 June 2012	DF	(Algeria) Amine Boulahia	JSM Béjaïa	Undisclosed	
1 July 2012	MF	(Algeria) Reda Benhadj Djillali	(Saudi Arabia) Najran SC	Return from loan	
1 July 2012	DF	(Algeria) Amer Belakhdar	JSM Béjaïa	Undisclosed	
1 July 2012	GK	(Algeria) Mohamed Seghir Ferradji	CA Bordj Bou Arréridj	Undisclosed	
1 July 2012	MF	(Algeria) Fouad Allag	NA Hussein Dey	Undisclosed	
1 July 2012	MF	(Algeria) (France) Karim Benounes	(Hungary) Egri FC	Free transfer	
1 July 2012	FW	(Algeria) (France) Mehdi Kerrouche	(England) Swindon Town	Free transfer	
12 July 2012	FW	(Algeria) Nabil Hemani	JS Kabylie	Undisclosed	
17 July 2012	DF	(Algeria) Adlen Griche	USM El Harrach	Undisclosed	
1 August 2012	MF	(Algeria) Aziz Tafer	(Romania) Gloria Buzău	Undisclosed	

==== Winter ====
Date	Pos	Player	Moving from	Fee	Source
1 January 2013	MF	(Algeria) Bilal Bahloul	JSM Béjaïa	Undisclosed	
6 January 2013	FW	(Algeria) Mohamed Tiaiba	MC El Eulma	Undisclosed	
7 January 2013	FW	(Algeria) Abdenour Hadiouche	JS Kabylie	Free transfer	
10 January 2013	DF	(Algeria) Abderraouf Zarabi	MC Oran	Undisclosed	
15 January 2013	GK	(Algeria) Lounès Gaouaoui	AS Khroub	Free transfer	
16 January 2013	MF	(Algeria) Billal Sebaihi	USM El Harrach	Loan	

=== Out ===
==== Summer ====
Date	Pos	Player	Moving to	Fee	Source
5 June 2012	DF	(Algeria) Mohamed Khoutir Ziti	ES Sétif	Undisclosed	
1 July 2012	DF	(Algeria) Zineddine Mekkaoui	JS Kabylie	Free transfer	
1 July 2012	MF	(Algeria) Bilal Bahloul	JSM Béjaïa	Undisclosed	
3 July 2012	GK	(Algeria) Amara Daïf	USM Alger	Free transfer	

==== Winter ====
Date	Pos	Player	Moving to	Fee	Source
27 April 2013	DF	(Algeria) Abderraouf Zarabi	(Finland) PK-35 Vantaa	Free transfer	
27 April 2013	MF	(Algeria) (France) Karim Benounes	(Finland) PK-35 Vantaa	Free transfer	

== Pre-season and friendlies ==
28 July 2012 Friendly	CS Constantine (Algeria)	1–3	(France) OGC Nice	Constantine
22:00 UTC+1	K. Coulibaly 14' (o.g.)	Report	Traoré 32'; Monzón 73'; K. Coulibaly 80'	Stadium: Stade Mohamed Hamlaoui; Attendance: 55,000; Referee: Boubekeur Zouaoui
Note: Lineup for CS Constantine; First half – Natache, Boulahia, Belakhdar, Djilali, Zarabi, Mansouri (c), Gil, Nait Yahia, Boucherit, Boulemdais, Bezzaz. Second half – Feradji, Haouche, Belakhdar, Djilali (Griche, 62'), Zarabi, Ferhat Ayoub, Gil, Mansouri (Efossa, 67'), Benhadj, Kerrouche, Bezzaz (Bouamria, 67').

== Competitions ==
=== Overview ===
Competition	Record								Started round	Final position / round	First match	Last match
Competition	G	W	D	L	GF	GA	GD	Win %	Started round	Final position / round	First match	Last match
Ligue 1	30	13	13	4	37	20	+17	43.33	—N/a	3rd	15 September 2012	21 May 2013
Algerian Cup	4	3	0	1	11	5	+6	75.00	Round of 64	Quarter-final	14 December 2012	29 March 2013
Total	34	16	13	5	48	25	+23	47.06				

Updated to match played 9 May 2017
Source: Competitions

=== Ligue 1 ===
==== League table ====
Pos	Team	Pld	W	D	L	GF	GA	GD	Pts	Qualification or relegation
1	ES Sétif (C)	30	18	5	7	55	27	+28	59	Qualification for the Champions League preliminary round
2	USM El Harrach (Note: USM El Harrach, the 2012–13 Algerian Ligue Professionnelle 1 runner-up, withdrew after the draw was held. Sporting Praia Cruz, the 2013 São Tomé and Príncipe Championship champion, were allowed by the CAF to replace them in the draw.)	30	17	6	7	38	22	+16	57	Qualification for the Champions League preliminary round
3	CS Constantine	30	13	13	4	37	20	+17	52	Qualification for the Confederation Cup preliminary round
4	USM Alger (Note: USM Alger, the 2012–13 Algerian Cup winner, withdrew before the start of the competition.)	30	15	6	9	32	15	+17	51	Qualification for the Confederation Cup preliminary round
5	MC Alger (Note: In a match between USM El Harrach and MC Alger the last refused to play in the Stade 1er Novembre 1954, but the LFP refused to change the pitch, Despite the presence of USM El Harrach, the referees and supporters, but the Mouloudia team did not attend. the club will receive a penalty, according to Article 84 of the Disciplinary Code of the Algerian Football Federation (FAF), "a match lost by penalty. Defalcation of three (03) points, One million dinars (1,000,000 dinars) fine for the club. "The offending club will be deprived of its compensation due for television rights.)	30	15	8	7	33	24	+9	50	

Updated to match(es) played on 21 May 2013. Source: DZFoot
Rules for classification: 1) points; 2) head-to-head points; 3) head-to-head goal difference; 4) goal difference; 5) total goals; 6) fairplay ranking; 7) playoff.
(C) Champions

==== Results summary ====
Overall								Home						Away					
Pld	W	D	L	GF	GA	GD	Pts	W	D	L	GF	GA	GD	W	D	L	GF	GA	GD
30	13	13	4	37	20	+17	52	10	4	1	22	9	+13	3	9	3	15	11	+4

Last updated: 29 December 2014.
Source: Competitive matches

==== Results by round ====
Round	1	2	3	4	5	6	7	8	9	10	11	12	13	14	15	16	17	18	19	20	21	22	23	24	25	26	27	28	29	30
Ground	A	H	A	H	A	H	A	A	H	A	H	A	H	A	H	H	A	H	A	H	A	H	H	A	H	A	H	A	H	A
Result	D	W	D	D	W	W	D	L	L	D	W	L	W	L	D	W	D	W	D	W	D	W	D	D	W	D	W	W	D	W
Position	6	6	6	8	3	2	3	4	8	8	7	7	7	7	7	6	5	5	5	5	5	5	5	5	5	5	4	4	4	3

Source: Competitive matches
A = Away; H = Home; W = Win; D = Draw; L = Loss

=== Matches ===
15 September 2012 Round 1	USM Alger	1–1	CS Constantine	Algiers
18:00	Daham 26'	Report	27' Boulemdaïs	Stadium: Stade Omar Hamadi; Referee: Mohamed Saïdi

18 September 2012 Round 2	CS Constantine	4–3	MC Oran	Constantine
18:00	Benhadj 4'; Boulemdaïs 31', 62'; Bezzaz 39'	Report	19' Kouriba; 42' Chérif; 82' Aoued	Stadium: Stade Mohamed Hamlaoui; Referee: Mohamed Bichari

22 September 2012 Round 3	ASO Chlef	1–1	CS Constantine	Chlef
18:00	Gharbi 17'	Report	67' Boulemdaïs	Stadium: Stade Mohamed Boumezrag; Referee: Mohamed Ghorbal

29 September 2012 Round 4	CS Constantine	2–2	JSM Béjaïa	Constantine
17:45	Boulemdaïs 70', 88' (pen.)	Report	58' Bahloul; 73' Derrag	Stadium: Stade Mohamed Hamlaoui; Referee: Merzak Halalchi

6 October 2012 Round 5	USM Bel-Abbès	0–2	CS Constantine	Sidi Bel Abbès
18:00		Report	69', 74' Boulemdaïs	Stadium: Stade 24 Fevrier 1956; Referee: Farouk Mial

16 October 2012 Round 6	CS Constantine	1–0	CR Belouizdad	Constantine
16:30	Bezzaz 90+4'	Report		Stadium: Stade Mohamed Hamlaoui; Referee: Boubekeur Zouaoui

20 October 2012 Round 7	JS Saoura	0–0	CS Constantine	Béchar
15:00		Report		Stadium: Stade 20 Août 1955; Referee: Mohamed Saïdi

23 October 2012 Round 8	MC Alger	1–0	CS Constantine	Algiers
18:00	Djallit 12' (pen.)	Report		Stadium: July 5, 1962 Stadium; Referee: Mohamed Benouza

3 November 2012 Round 9	CS Constantine	1–2	JS Kabylie	Constantine
17:45	Boulemdaïs 10'	Report	61' Rial; 84' Messadia	Stadium: Stade Mohamed Hamlaoui; Referee: Mohamed Bichari

10 November 2012 Round 10	CA Bordj Bou Arréridj	1–1	CS Constantine	Bordj Bou Arréridj
18:00	Belkheïr 69'	Report	64' Belakhdar	Stadium: Stade 20 Août 1955; Referee: Merzak Halalchi

17 November 2012 Round 11	CS Constantine	2–0	WA Tlemcen	Constantine
18:00	Bezzaz 42'; Allag 59'	Report		Stadium: Stade Mohamed Hamlaoui; Referee: Amine Sekhraoui

24 November 2012 Round 12	MC El Eulma	1–0	CS Constantine	El Eulma
18:00	Gharbi 89'	Report		Stadium: Stade Messaoud Zougar; Referee: Mokhtar Amalou

1 December 2012 Round 13	CS Constantine	2–0	CA Batna	Constantine
17:45	Bezzaz 35'; Djilali 39'	Report		Stadium: Stade Mohamed Hamlaoui; Referee: Farouk Mial

8 December 2012 Round 14	USM El Harrach	1–0	CS Constantine	Algiers
15:00	Kerim 23'	Report		Stadium: Stade 1er Novembre 1954; Referee: Mohamed Saïdi

21 December 2012 Round 15	CS Constantine	0–0	ES Sétif	Constantine
15:00		Report		Stadium: Stade Mohamed Hamlaoui; Referee: Merzak Halalchi

15 January 2013 Round 16	CS Constantine	1–0	USM Alger	Constantine
15:00	Hadiouche 5'	Report		Stadium: Stade Mohamed Hamlaoui; Referee: Farouk Mial

19 January 2013 Round 17	MC Oran	1–1	CS Constantine	Oran
15:00	Chérif 51'	Report	36' Tiaïba	Stadium: Ahmed Zabana Stadium; Referee: Mokhtar Amalou

26 January 2013 Round 18	CS Constantine	1–0	ASO Chlef	Constantine
15:00	Boulahia 26'	Report		Stadium: Stade Mohamed Hamlaoui; Referee: Mohamed Ghorbal

2 February 2013 Round 19	JSM Béjaïa	0–0	CS Constantine	Béjaïa
17:45		Report		Stadium: Stade de l'Unité Maghrébine; Referee: Mohamed Bachir

9 February 2013 Round 20	CS Constantine	2–1	USM Bel-Abbès	Constantine
15:00	Boulemdaïs 70'; Boucherit 86' (pen.)	Report	13' El Bahari	Stadium: Stade Mohamed Hamlaoui; Referee: Boubekeur Zouaoui

16 February 2013 Round 21	CR Belouizdad	1–1	CS Constantine	Belouizdad
15:00	Khoudi 73'	Report	8' (o.g.) Harkat	Stadium: Stade 20 Août 1955; Referee: Mohamed Saïdi

23 February 2013 Round 22	CS Constantine	2–1	JS Saoura	Constantine
15:00	Tiaiba 45'; Bezzaz 82'	Report	90+5' Daouda	Stadium: Stade Mohamed Hamlaoui; Referee: Merzak Halalchi

9 March 2013 Round 23	CS Constantine	0–0	MC Alger	Constantine
15:00		Report		Stadium: Stade Mohamed Hamlaoui; Referee: Mohamed Benouza

19 March 2013 Round 24	JS Kabylie	1–1	CS Constantine	Tizi Ouzou
15:00	Chalali 26'	Report	59' Boulahia	Stadium: Stade 1er Novembre 1954; Referee: Mohamed Ghorbal

6 April 2013 Round 25	CS Constantine	1–0	CA Bordj Bou Arréridj	Constantine
18:45	Djilali 27'	Report		Stadium: Stade Mohamed Hamlaoui; Referee: Mohamed Bachir

20 April 2013 Round 26	WA Tlemcen	0–0	CS Constantine	Tlemcen
16:00		Report		Stadium: Stade Akid Lotfi; Referee: Boubekeur Zouaoui

4 May 2013 Round 27	CS Constantine	3–0	MC El Eulma	Constantine
17:00	Boulahia 52'; Nait Yahia 62'; Tiaiba 67'	Report		Stadium: Stade Mohamed Hamlaoui; Referee: Merzak Halalchi

11 May 2013 Round 28	CA Batna	1–4	CS Constantine	Batna
17:00	Ngomo 22' (o.g.)	Report	15', 41' Hadiouche; 85' Ferhat; 88' Tiaiba	Stadium: November 1, 1954 Stadium; Referee: Mohamed Bichari

18 May 2013 Round 29	CS Constantine	0–0	USM El Harrach	Constantine
17:00		Report		Stadium: Stade Mohamed Hamlaoui; Referee: Farouk Mial

21 May 2013 Round 30	ES Sétif	1–3	CS Constantine	Sétif
17:00	Aoudia 45+2'	Report	13', 60' Belakhdar; 63' Bezzaz	Stadium: Stade 8 Mai 1945; Referee: Amine Sekhraoui

== Algerian Cup ==
14 December 2012 Round of 64	USM Annaba	0–3	CS Constantine	Annaba
15:00			12' Boulemdaïs; 26' Nehari; 39' Hemani	Stadium: May 19, 1956 Stadium; Referee: Mokhtar Amalou

28 December 2012 Round of 32	CS Constantine	5–1	USM Bel-Abbès	Constantine
15:00	Hemani 2'; Bezzaz 4' (pen.); Boulemdaïs 9', 54'; Nait Yahia 14'		38' El Bahari	Stadium: Stade Mohamed Hamlaoui; Referee: Emrid

2 March 2013 Round of 16	CS Constantine	3–1	USM Blida	Constantine
14:00	Boucherit 15' (pen.); Tiaiba 35'; Hemani 70'		25' Melika	Stadium: Stade Mohamed Hamlaoui; Referee: Farouk Mial

29 March 2013 Quarter-final	MC Alger	3–0	CS Constantine	Algiers
17:00	Bouguèche 42'; Ghazi 45'; Djallit 90+3' (pen.)			Stadium: July 5, 1962 Stadium; Referee: Djamel Haimoudi

== Squad information ==
=== Appearances and goals ===
No.	Pos	Player	Nat	Ligue 1			Algerian Cup			Total		
No.	Pos	Player	Nat	App	St	G	App	St	G	App	St	G
Goalkeepers
1	GK	Abderaouf Natèche	(Algeria)	25	24	-14	4	4	-5	29	28	-19
16	GK	Lounès Gaouaoui	(Algeria)	2	2	-0	0	0	-0	2	2	-0
Defenders
46	DF	Abdelkader Messaoudi	(Algeria)	9	6	0	2	0	0	11	6	0
28	DF	Amer Belakhdar	(Algeria)	23	19	3	4	1	0	27	20	3
9	DF	Adlen Griche	(Algeria)	23	22	0	3	3	0	26	25	0
2	DF	Amine Boulahia	(Algeria)	24	23	3	4	4	0	28	27	0
5	DF	Youcef Nehari	(Algeria)	9	8	0	2	2	1	11	10	1
	DF	Réda Haouche	(Algeria)	3	2	0	0	0	0	3	2	0
21	DF	Yahia Djilali	(Algeria)	21	21	2	4	4	0	25	25	2
Midfielders
4	MF	Yazid Mansouri	(Algeria)	6	6	0	0	0	0	6	6	0
77	MF	Yacine Bezzaz	(Algeria)	23	23	6	3	3	1	26	26	7
20	MF	Fouad Allag	(Algeria)	22	16	1	4	3	0	26	19	1
15	MF	Antar Boucherit	(Algeria)	29	28	1	4	4	1	33	32	2
17	MF	Reda Benhadj Djillali	(Algeria)	11	7	1	0	0	0	11	7	1
6	MF	Gilles Ngomo	(Cameroon)	21	20	0	3	3	0	24	23	0
26	MF	Aziz Tafer	(Algeria)	16	13	0	2	2	0	18	15	0
8	MF	Karim Nait Yahia	(Algeria)	21	17	1	3	3	1	24	20	2
	MF	Charaf Eddine Kassis	(Algeria)	2	0	0	1	0	0	3	0	0
86	MF	Bilal Bahloul	(Algeria)	13	12	0	2	0	0	15	12	0
Forwards
7	FW	Ayoub Ferhat	(Algeria)	20	5	1	1	0	0	21	5	1
11	FW	Mohamed Tiaiba	(Algeria)	12	7	4	2	2	1	14	9	5
25	FW	Nabil Hemani	(Algeria)	18	9	0	4	4	3	22	13	3
19	FW	Abdenour Hadiouche	(Algeria)	14	6	3	0	0	0	14	6	3
14	FW	Hamza Boulemdaïs	(Algeria)	29	27	10	3	2	3	32	29	13
Players transferred out during the season
~~NA~~	GK	Mohamed Seghir Ferradji	(Algeria)	4	4	-6	0	0	-0	4	4	-6
~~29~~	DF	Abderraouf Zarabi	(Algeria)	3	3	0	0	0	0	3	3	0
~~10~~	MF	Karim Benounes	(Algeria)	2	0	0	0	0	0	2	0	0
Total				30		37	4		11	34		48

Last updated: 9 April 2025
Source: soccerway.com

=== Goalscorers ===
Includes all competitive matches.

No.	Nat.	Player	Pos.	L1	AC	TOTAL
14	(Algeria)	Hamza Boulemdaïs	ST	10	3	13
77	(Algeria)	Yacine Bezzaz	LM	6	1	7
11	(Algeria)	Mohamed Tiaiba	ST	4	1	5
19	(Algeria)	Abdenour Hadiouche	ST	3	0	3
28	(Algeria)	Amer Belakhdar	LB	3	0	3
2	(Algeria)	Amine Boulahia	RB	3	0	3
25	(Algeria)	Nabil Hemani	ST	0	3	3
21	(Algeria)	Yahia Djilali	CB	2	0	2
15	(Algeria)	Antar Boucherit	DM	1	1	2
8	(Algeria)	Karim Nait Yahia	RM	1	1	2
20	(Algeria)	Fouad Allag	DM	1	0	1
17	(Algeria)	Reda Benhadj Djillali	DM	1	0	1
7	(Algeria)	Ayoub Ferhat	RW	1	0	1
5	(Algeria)	Youcef Nehari	CB	0	1	1
Own Goals				1	0	1
Totals				37	11	48
