= 2012–13 USM Bel-Abbès season =

USM Bel-Abbès
2012–13 season
- Head coach: Fouad Bouali (until 23 July 2012) (until 30 October 2012); Abdelkader Yaïche (until 14 November 2012)
- Stadium: Stade 24 Fevrier 1956
- Ligue 1: 16th
- Algerian Cup: Round of 32
- Top goalscorer: League: Houari Hamiche (5); All: Nasereddine El Bahari (8)

In the 2012–13 season, USM Bel-Abbès is competing in the Ligue 1 for the 20th season, as well as the Algerian Cup. They will be competing in Ligue 1, and the Algerian Cup.

== Squad list ==
Players and squad numbers last updated on 18 November 2012.
Note: Flags indicate national team as has been defined under FIFA eligibility rules. Players may hold more than one non-FIFA nationality.

No.	Nat.	Position	Name	Date of Birth (Age)	Signed from
Goalkeepers
Defenders
Midfielders
Forwards

== Competitions ==
=== Overview ===
Competition	Record								Started round	Final position / round	First match	Last match
Competition	G	W	D	L	GF	GA	GD	Win %	Started round	Final position / round	First match	Last match
Ligue 1	30	5	7	18	18	45	−27	16.67	—N/a	16th	15 September 2012	21 May 2013
Algerian Cup	2	1	0	1	5	6	−1	50.00	Round of 64	Round of 32	14 December 2012	28 December 2012
Total	32	6	7	19	23	51	−28	18.75				

Updated to match played 9 May 2017
Source: Competitions

== League table ==
Pos	Team	Pld	W	D	L	GF	GA	GD	Pts	Qualification or relegation
12	MC Oran	30	8	10	12	33	41	−8	34	
13	CA Bordj Bou Arréridj	30	7	12	11	20	26	−6	33	
14	CA Batna (R)	30	6	8	16	20	46	−26	26	Relegation to Ligue Professionnelle 2
15	WA Tlemcen (R)	30	6	6	18	19	43	−24	24	Relegation to Ligue Professionnelle 2
16	USM Bel-Abbès (R)	30	5	7	18	18	45	−27	22	Relegation to Ligue Professionnelle 2

Updated to match(es) played on 21 May 2013. Source: DZFoot
Rules for classification: 1) points; 2) head-to-head points; 3) head-to-head goal difference; 4) goal difference; 5) total goals; 6) fairplay ranking; 7) playoff.
(R) Relegated

=== Results summary ===
Overall								Home						Away					
Pld	W	D	L	GF	GA	GD	Pts	W	D	L	GF	GA	GD	W	D	L	GF	GA	GD
30	5	7	18	18	45	−27	22	4	3	8	7	13	−6	1	4	10	11	32	−21

Last updated: 29 December 2014.
Source: Competitive matches

=== Results by round ===
Round	1	2	3	4	5	6	7	8	9	10	11	12	13	14	15	16	17	18	19	20	21	22	23	24	25	26	27	28	29	30
Ground	A	H	A	A	H	A	H	A	H	A	H	A	H	A	H	H	A	H	H	A	H	A	H	A	H	A	H	A	H	A
Result	L	L	D	D	L	L	W	L	L	L	W	D	L	L	D	L	W	W	D	L	W	L	D	L	L	L	L	D	L	L
Position	12	13	14	13	16	16	13	14	15	15	15	14	16	16	15	16	15	15	15	15	14	15	14	15	15	16	16	16	16	16

Source: Competitive matches
A = Away; H = Home; W = Win; D = Draw; L = Loss

=== Matches ===
7 September 2012 Round 1	ASO Chlef	2–1	USM Bel Abbès	Chlef
20:30	Messaoud 8', 90+5'	Report	60' Hamiche	Stadium: Stade Mohamed Boumezrag; Referee: Sofiane Bousseter

18 September 2012 Round 2	USM Bel Abbès	0–1	JSM Béjaïa	Sidi Bel Abbès
18:00		Report	50' Zerara	Stadium: Stade 24 Fevrier 1956; Referee: Mehdi Abid Charef

22 September 2012 Round 3	MC Oran	1–1	USM Bel Abbès	Oran
17:45	Dagoulou 67'	Report	38' Boukhari	Stadium: Ahmed Zabana Stadium; Referee: Boubekeur Zouaoui

28 September 2012 Round 4	CR Belouizdad	0–0	USM Bel Abbès	Belouizdad
16:45		Report		Stadium: Stade 20 Août 1955; Referee: Redouane Necib

6 October 2012 Round 5	USM Bel Abbès	0–2	CS Constantine	Sidi Bel Abbès
18:00		Report	69', 74' Boulemdaïs	Stadium: Stade 24 Fevrier 1956; Referee: Farouk Mial

16 October 2012 Round 6	MC Alger	3–1	USM Bel Abbès	Algiers
18:00	Djallit 18'; Metref 31'; Yachir 53'	Report	82' Hamiche	Stadium: July 5, 1962 Stadium; Referee: Rafik Achouri

20 October 2012 Round 7	USM Bel Abbès	1–0	CA Batna	Sidi Bel Abbès
17:45	Hamiche 11' (pen.)	Report		Stadium: Stade 24 Fevrier 1956; Referee: Merzak Halalchi

23 October 2012 Round 8	CA Bordj Bou Arreridj	2–0	USM Bel Abbès	Bordj Bou Arréridj
18:00	Mesfar 2'; Mosrati 83'	Report		Stadium: Stade 20 Août 1955; Referee: Mohamed Bichari

3 November 2012 Round 9	USM Bel Abbès	0–2	ES Sétif	Sidi Bel Abbès
15:00		Report	68', 84' Chalali	Stadium: Stade 24 Fevrier 1956; Referee: Redouane Necib

10 November 2012 Round 10	MC El Eulma	2–0	USM Bel Abbès	El Eulma
18:00	Derrardja 59'; Chenihi 84'	Report		Stadium: Stade Messaoud Zougar; Referee: Farouk Mial

17 November 2012 Round 11	USM Bel Abbès	1–0	JS Kabylie	Sidi Bel Abbès
15:00	Hamiche 63' (pen.)	Report		Stadium: Stade 24 Fevrier 1956; Referee: Farouk Houasnia

24 November 2012 Round 12	USM El Harrach	1–1	USM Bel Abbès	Algiers
15:00	Bounedjah 83'	Report	35' Slimane	Stadium: Stade 1er Novembre 1954; Referee: Boubekeur Zouaoui

1 December 2012 Round 13	USM Bel Abbès	0–1	WA Tlemcen	Sidi Bel Abbès
15:00		Report	88' Sameur	Stadium: Stade 24 Fevrier 1956; Referee: Mokhtar Amalou

7 December 2012 Round 14	USM Alger	6–0	USM Bel Abbès	Algiers
16:00	Gasmi 35' (pen.); Tedjar 59'; Daham 69', 78'; Bouchema 86'; Djediat 90+2'	Report		Stadium: Stade Omar Hamadi; Referee: Rafik Achouri

22 December 2012 Round 15	USM Bel Abbès	0–0	JS Saoura	Sidi Bel Abbès
15:00		Report		Stadium: Stade 24 Fevrier 1956; Referee: Mohamed Bichari

15 January 2013 Round 16	USM Bel Abbès	0–1	ASO Chlef	Sidi Bel Abbès
15:00		Report	15' Djabout	Stadium: Stade 24 Fevrier 1956; Referee: Merzak Halalchi

19 January 2013 Round 17	JSM Béjaïa	1–3	USM Bel Abbès	Béjaïa
15:00	Zerara 26'	Report	9' El Bahari; 77' (pen.) Belhadi; 86' Belguerfi	Stadium: Stade de l'Unité Maghrébine; Referee: Said Aouina

26 January 2013 Round 18	USM Bel Abbès	1–0	MC Oran	Sidi Bel Abbès
15:00	Belhadi 2'	Report		Stadium: Stade 24 Fevrier 1956; Attendance: 0 (close doors); Referee: Redouane Necib

2 February 2013 Round 19	USM Bel Abbès	0–0	CR Belouizdad	Sidi Bel Abbès
15:00		Report		Stadium: Stade 24 Fevrier 1956; Referee: Mehdi Abid Charef

9 February 2013 Round 20	CS Constantine	2–1	USM Bel Abbès	Constantine
15:00	Boulemdaïs 70'; Boucherit 86' (pen.)	Report	13' El Bahari	Stadium: Stade Mohamed Hamlaoui; Referee: Boubekeur Zouaoui

16 February 2013 Round 21	USM Bel Abbès	2–1	MC Alger	Sidi Bel Abbès
15:00	Khali 54'; Hamiche 77' (pen.)	Report	30' Metref	Stadium: Stade 24 Fevrier 1956; Referee: Farouk Mial

23 February 2013 Round 22	CA Batna	1–0	USM Bel Abbès	Batna
15:00	Bouraba 38'	Report		Stadium: November 1, 1954 Stadium; Referee: Farouk Houasnia

9 March 2013 Round 23	USM Bel Abbès	1–1	CA Bordj Bou Arreridj	Sidi Bel Abbès
15:00	El Bahari 43'	Report	49' Ammour	Stadium: Stade 24 Fevrier 1956; Referee: Mokhtar Amalou

12 March 2013 Round 24	ES Sétif	4–0	USM Bel Abbès	Sétif
18:00	Madouni 31'; Aoudia 35', 45+2'; Nadji 44'	Report		Stadium: Stade 8 Mai 1945; Referee: Mohamed Bichari

6 April 2013 Round 25	USM Bel Abbès	0–1	MC El Eulma	Sidi Bel Abbès
16:00		Report	75' Chenihi	Stadium: Stade 24 Fevrier 1956; Referee: Merzak Halalchi

19 April 2013 Round 26	JS Kabylie	2–1	USM Bel Abbès	Tizi Ouzou
15:00	Maroci 2'; Chalali 52'	Report	89' W. Belguerfi	Stadium: Stade 1er Novembre 1954; Referee: Abderrezzak Arab

4 May 2013 Round 27	USM Bel Abbès	1–2	USM El Harrach	Sidi Bel Abbès
17:00	Bounoua 59' (pen.)	Report	12', 82' El Amali	Stadium: Stade 24 Fevrier 1956; Referee: Said Aouina

11 May 2013 Round 28	WA Tlemcen	2–2	USM Bel Abbès	Tlemcen
17:00	Sameur 4' (pen.); Chaouti 6'	Report	20' Belguerfi; 69' El Bahari	Stadium: Stade Akid Lotfi; Referee: Mehdi Abid Charef

18 May 2013 Round 29	USM Bel Abbès	0–1	USM Alger	Sidi Bel Abbes
17:00		Report	Rabti 90+1'	Stadium: Stade 24 Fevrier 1956; Referee: Hakim Bouchama

21 May 2013 Round 30	JS Saoura	3–0	USM Bel Abbès	Béchar
17:00	Bagayoko 30'; Khali 61' (o.g.); Hamzaoui 80'	Report		Stadium: Stade 20 Août 1955; Referee: Boussaid

== Algerian Cup ==
14 December 2012 Round of 64	USM Bel Abbès	4–1 (a.e.t.)	UC Doucen	Sidi Bel Abbès
15:00	Benyacine 62'; El Bahari 93', 100', 113'	Repport	24' Benchaoui	Stadium: Stade 24 Fevrier 1956; Referee: Nader

28 December 2012 Round of 32	CS Constantine	5–1	USM Bel Abbès	Constantine
15:00	Hemani 2'; Bezzaz 4' (pen.); Boulemdaïs 9', 54'; Nait Yahia 14'	Repport	38' El Bahari	Stadium: Stade Mohamed Hamlaoui; Referee: Emrid

== Squad information ==
=== Playing statistics ===
No.	Pos	Nat	Player	Total		Ligue 1		Algerian Cup	
No.	Pos	Nat	Player	Apps	Goals	Apps	Goals	Apps	Goals
Goalkeepers
	GK	(Algeria) ALG	El Hadi Fayçal Ouadah	11	0	11	0	0	0
16	GK	(Algeria) ALG	Sofiane Benmoussa	13	0	13	0	0	0
	GK	(Algeria) ALG	Lahouari El Ghoul	4	0	4	0	0	0
30	GK	(Algeria) ALG	Abennour Argoub	4	0	4	0	0	0
Defenders
5	DF	(Algeria) ALG	Smaïl Diss	12	0	12	0	0	0
15	DF	(Algeria) ALG	Rabah Ziad	18	0	18	0	0	0
4	DF	(Algeria) ALG	Nadjib Maaziz	21	0	21	0	0	0
28	DF	(Algeria) ALG	Tarik Boughendja	12	0	12	0	0	0
6	DF	(Algeria) ALG	Zakaria Khali	16	1	16	1	0	0
2	DF	(Algeria) ALG	Mohamed Belhadi	12	2	12	2	0	0
	DF	(Algeria) ALG	Djamel Saïm	9	0	9	0	0	0
	DF	(Algeria) ALG	Mohamed Bendjbara	1	0	1	0	0	0
	DF	(Algeria) ALG	Zouaoui Tazi	1	0	1	0	0	0
	DF	(Algeria) ALG	Walid Benali	1	0	1	0	0	0
Midfielders
	MF	(Algeria) ALG	Mohamed Lahmar Abbou	7	0	7	0	0	0
7	MF	(Algeria) ALG	Azzedine Benchaïra	4	0	4	0	0	0
20	MF	(Algeria) ALG	Abbas Aïssaoui	16	0	16	0	0	0
11	MF	(Algeria) ALG	Nassim Zazoua Khames	4	0	4	0	0	0
	MF	(Algeria) ALG	Abdelmadjid Benatia	22	0	22	0	0	0
14	MF	(Algeria) ALG	Abdelhadi Kada Benyacine	19	0	19	0	0	0
8	MF	(Algeria) ALG	Houari Hamiche	22	5	22	5	0	0
13	MF	(Algeria) ALG	Alaeddine Labiod	23	0	23	0	0	0
31	MF	(Algeria) ALG	Abdessamed Bounoua	23	1	23	1	0	0
3	MF	(Algeria) ALG	Mohamed Abdelli	9	0	9	0	0	0
17	MF	(Algeria) ALG	Youssef Slimane	16	1	16	1	0	0
21	MF	(Algeria) ALG	Mohamed Mokdad	10	0	10	0	0	0
	MF	(Algeria) ALG	Brahmi	1	0	1	0	0	0
29	MF	(Algeria) ALG	Abdelmoutaleb Ghodbane	3	0	3	0	0	0
	MF	(Algeria) ALG	Merouane Abdelbasset Guerriche	2	0	2	0	0	0
	MF	(Algeria) ALG	Mounir Berrezouk	1	0	1	0	0	0
	MF	(Algeria) ALG	Rachid Mekaret	1	0	1	0	0	0
	MF	(Algeria) ALG	Ahmed Abbaci	1	0	1	0	0	0
	MF	(Algeria) ALG	Younes Benmouna	1	0	1	0	0	0
	MF	(Algeria) ALG	Hichem Hanifi	1	0	1	0	0	0
Forwards
9	FW	(Algeria) ALG	Yassine Boukhari	22	1	22	1	0	0
22	FW	(Algeria) ALG	Nasereddine El Bahari	27	4	27	4	0	0
27	FW	(Algeria) ALG	Rachid Benharoun	9	0	9	0	0	0
	FW	(Cameroon) CMR	Cyril Ndaney	10	0	10	0	0	0
	FW	(Algeria) ALG	Okacha Hamzaoui	13	0	13	0	0	0
10	FW	(Algeria) ALG	Walid Belguerfi	8	3	8	3	0	0
26	FW	(Algeria) ALG	Mohamed Amine Bousmaha	7	0	7	0	0	0
Players transferred out during the season

Last updated: 4 December 2017
Source: fr.soccerway.com

=== Goalscorers ===
Includes all competitive matches. The list is sorted alphabetically by surname when total goals are equal.

No.	Nat.	Player	Pos.	L 1	AC	TOTAL
22	(Algeria)	Nasereddine El Bahari	FW	4	4	8
8	(Algeria)	Houari Hamiche	MF	5	0	5
10	(Algeria)	Walid Belguerfi	FW	3	0	3
2	(Algeria)	Mohamed Belhadi	DF	2	0	2
9	(Algeria)	Yassine Boukhari	FW	1	0	1
6	(Algeria)	Zakaria Khali	DF	1	0	1
31	(Algeria)	Abdessamed Bounoua	MF	1	0	1
17	(Algeria)	Youssef Slimane	MF	1	0	1
14	(Algeria)	Abdelhadi Kada Benyacine	MF	0	1	1
Own Goals				0	0	0
Totals				18	5	23

== Transfers ==
=== In ===
Date	Pos	Player	From club	Transfer fee	Source
1 July 2012	GK	(Algeria) El Hadi Fayçal Ouadah	USM Annaba	Free transfer	
1 July 2012	DF	(Algeria) Smaïl Diss	CR Belouizdad	Free transfer	
1 July 2012	DF	(Algeria) Nadjib Maaziz	ES Sétif	Free transfer	
1 July 2012	DF	(Algeria) Rabah Ziad	AS Khroub	Free transfer	
1 July 2012	MF	(Algeria) Abdelmadjid Benatia	MC Oran	Free transfer	
1 July 2012	MF	(Algeria) Mohamed Lahmar Abbou	CR Belouizdad	Free transfer	
1 July 2012	MF	(Algeria) Azzedine Benchaïra	JSM Béjaïa	Free transfer	
1 July 2012	MF	(Algeria) Abbas Aïssaoui	USM El Harrach	Free transfer	
1 July 2012	FW	(Cameroon) Cyril Ndaney	ES Sétif	Free transfer	
1 July 2012	FW	(Algeria) Nasereddine El Bahari	MC Oran	Free transfer	
1 January 2013	DF	(Algeria) Mohamed Belhadi	WA Boufarik	Free transfer	
12 January 2013	FW	(Algeria) Okacha Hamzaoui	JS Saoura	Undisclosed	
