= 2011–12 CA Batna season =

CA Batna
2011–12 season
- Head coach: Ameur Djamil (until 20 February 2012)
- Stadium: Mustapha Seffouhi Stadium, Batna
- Ligue 1: 7th
- Algerian Cup: Round of 64
- Top goalscorer: League: Ahmed Messadia (12); All: Ahmed Messadia (12)

In the 2011–12 season, CA Batna is competing in the Ligue 1 for the 21st season, as well as the Algerian Cup.

== Squad list ==
Players and squad numbers last updated on 18 November 2011.
Note: Flags indicate national team as has been defined under FIFA eligibility rules. Players may hold more than one non-FIFA nationality.

No.	Nat.	Position	Name	Date of birth (age)	Signed from
Goalkeepers
Defenders
Midfielders
Forwards

== Competitions ==
=== Overview ===
Competition	Record								Started round	Final position / round	First match	Last match
Competition	G	W	D	L	GF	GA	GD	Win %	Started round	Final position / round	First match	Last match
Ligue 1	30	12	8	10	38	25	+13	40.00	—N/a	7th	10 September 2011	19 May 2012
Algerian Cup	1	0	1	0	1	1	+0	0.00	Round of 64		30 December 2011	
Total	31	12	9	10	39	26	+13	38.71				

Updated to match played 9 May 2017
Source: Competitions

== League table ==
Pos	Team	Pld	W	D	L	GF	GA	GD	Pts
5	ASO Chlef	30	14	5	11	41	34	+7	47
6	MC Alger	30	11	11	8	35	33	+2	44
7	CA Batna	30	12	8	10	38	25	+13	44
8	WA Tlemcen	30	12	8	10	39	37	+2	44
9	JS Kabylie	30	10	11	9	29	23	+6	41

Updated to match(es) played on 19 April 2018. Source: DZFoot
Rules for classification: 1) points; 2) head-to-head points; 3) head-to-head goal difference; 4) goal difference; 5) total goals; 6) fairplay ranking; 7) playoff.

=== Results summary ===
Overall								Home						Away					
Pld	W	D	L	GF	GA	GD	Pts	W	D	L	GF	GA	GD	W	D	L	GF	GA	GD
30	12	8	10	38	25	+13	44	8	5	2	19	8	+11	4	3	8	19	17	+2

Last updated: 29 December 2014.
Source: Competitive matches

=== Results by round ===
Round	1	2	3	4	5	6	7	8	9	10	11	12	13	14	15	16	17	18	19	20	21	22	23	24	25	26	27	28	29	30
Ground	A	H	A	H	A	H	A	H	A	A	H	A	H	A	H	H	A	H	A	H	A	H	A	H	H	A	H	A	H	A
Result	W	W	D	D	W	D	D	W	L	L	L	L	D	L	W	L	D	D	L	D	L	W	L	W	W	W	W	W	W	W
Position																														7

Source: Competitive matches
A = Away; H = Home; W = Win; D = Draw; L = Loss

=== Matches ===
10 September 2011 Round 1	USM Alger	1–0	CA Batna	Algiers
19:00	Djediat 42'	Report		Stadium: Stade Omar Hammadi; Referee: Sofiane Bousseter

17 September 2011 Round 2	CA Batna	1–0	MC Saïda	Batna
19:00	Merazka 43'	Report		Stadium: Mustapha Seffouhi Stadium; Referee: Rafik Achouri

24 September 2011 Round 3	JS Kabylie	1–1	CA Batna	Tizi Ouzou
18:00	Hemani 65' (pen.)	Report	Messadia 80'	Stadium: Stade du 1er Novembre 1954; Attendance: 0 (close doors); Referee: Mohamed Sahraoui

1 October 2011 Round 4	CA Batna	0–0	CS Constantine	Batna
18:00		Report		Stadium: Mustapha Seffouhi Stadium; Referee: Mokhtar Amalou

15 October 2011 Round 5	NA Hussein Dey	1–2	CA Batna	Hussein Dey
18:00	El Okbi 25'	Report	Daira 40'; Messadia 83'	Stadium: Zioui Brothers Stadium; Referee: Mohamed Babou

22 October 2011 Round 6	CA Batna	0–0	JSM Béjaïa	Batna
16:00		Report		Stadium: Mustapha Seffouhi Stadium; Referee: Djamel Haimoudi

29 October 2011 Round 7	ASO Chlef	1–1	CA Batna	Chlef
18:00	Messaoud 59' (pen.)	Report	Merazka 19'	Stadium: Stade Mohamed Boumezrag; Referee: Farouk Mial

4 November 2011 Round 8	CA Batna	3–0	MC Alger	Batna
15:00	Benamara 53', 76'; Bouchouk 72'	Report		Stadium: Mustapha Seffouhi Stadium; Referee: Bouaza Chenane

19 November 2011 Round 9	ES Sétif	2–1	CA Batna	Sétif
18:00	Hachoud 30', 45'	Report	Messadia 20'	Stadium: Stade 8 Mai 1945; Referee: Mehdi Abid Charef

22 November 2011 Round 10	USM El Harrach	1–0	CA Batna	Algiers
15:00	Benyettou 5'	Report		Stadium: Stade 1er Novembre 1954; Referee: Mohamed Amine Ghorbal

26 November 2011 Round 11	CA Batna	0–2	CR Belouizdad	Batna
15:00		Report	Slimani 65'; Rebih 72'	Stadium: Mustapha Seffouhi Stadium; Referee: Mohamed Sahraoui

3 December 2011 Round 12	MC El Eulma	1–0	CA Batna	El Eulma
15:00	Hebbaïche 37'	Report		Stadium: Stade Messaoud Zougar; Referee: Farouk Houasnia

10 December 2011 Round 13	CA Batna	0–0	AS Khroub	Batna
15:00		Report		Stadium: Mustapha Seffouhi Stadium; Referee: Rafik Achouri

17 December 2011 Round 14	WA Tlemcen	2–1	CA Batna	Tlemcen
15:00	Andria 4'; Boudjakdji 87'	Report	Heriat 29'	Stadium: Stade Akid Lotfi; Referee: Farouk Mial

24 December 2011 Round 15	CA Batna	5–1	MC Oran	Batna
15:00	Bouchouk 12'; Amrane 53', 90+2'; Messadia 57', 68'	Report	Dagoulou 25'	Stadium: Mustapha Seffouhi Stadium; Referee: Mokhtar Amalou

21 January 2012 Round 16	CA Batna	0–1	USM Alger	Batna
17:45		Report	Lemmouchia 58'	Stadium: Stade du 1er-Novembre-1954; Referee: Mohamed Sahraoui

28 January 2012 Round 17	MC Saïda	1–1	CA Batna	Saida
15:00	Bagayoko 20'	Report	El Hadi 2'	Stadium: April 13, 1958 Stadium; Referee: Merzak Halalchi

31 January 2012 Round 18	CA Batna	0–0	JS Kabylie	Batna
17:45		Report		Stadium: Mustapha Seffouhi Stadium; Referee: Mohamed Amine Ghorbal

14 February 2012 Round 19	CS Constantine	2–1	CA Batna	Constantine
15:00	Ferhat 46'; Ngomo 49'	Report	Amrane 13'	Stadium: Stade Mohamed Hamlaoui; Referee: Mohamed Saïdi

18 February 2012 Round 20	CA Batna	0–0	NA Hussein Dey	Batna
17:45		Report		Stadium: Mustapha Seffouhi Stadium; Referee: Farouk Mial

25 February 2012 Round 21	JSM Béjaïa	1–0	CA Batna	Béjaïa
15:00	Belakhdar 73'	Report		Stadium: Stade de l'Unité Maghrébine; Referee: Bouaza Chenane

17 March 2012 Round 22	CA Batna	2–1	ASO Chlef	Batna
15:00	Merazka 46'; Maïdi 77'	Report	Messaoud 6'	Stadium: Mustapha Seffouhi Stadium; Referee: Farouk Houasnia

24 March 2012 Round 23	MC Alger	2–1	CA Batna	Algiers
17:45	Djallit 17'; Zeddam 83'	Report	Saïdi 66'	Stadium: Stade 5 Juillet 1962; Referee: Mohamed Saïdi

24 April 2012 Round 24	CA Batna	1–0	ES Sétif	Batna
16:00	Merazka 90+3'	Report		Stadium: Mustapha Seffouhi Stadium; Referee: Sofiane Bousseter

14 April 2012 Round 25	CA Batna	3–2	USM El Harrach	Batna
15:00	El Hadi 52', 82'; Messadia 55'	Report	Lagraa 37'; Tatem 48'	Stadium: Mustapha Seffouhi Stadium; Referee: Farouk Mial

28 April 2012 Round 26	CR Belouizdad	0–2	CA Batna	Belouizdad
16:00		Report	Merazka 50'; Messadia 64'	Stadium: Stade 20 Août 1955; Referee: Youssef Zerrouki

5 May 2012 Round 27	CA Batna	3–1	MC El Eulma	Batna
15:00	Merazka 16'; El Hadi 53', 76'	Report	Bouaïcha 72'	Stadium: Mustapha Seffouhi Stadium; Referee: Mokhtar Amalou

8 May 2012 Round 28	AS Khroub	0–3	CA Batna	El Khroub
15:00		Report	Messadia 8'; Saidi 61'; Mani 74'	Stadium: Abed Hamdani Stadium; Referee: Merzak Halalchi

15 May 2012 Round 29	CA Batna	1–0	WA Tlemcen	Batna
17:00	Messadia 75' (pen.)	Report		Stadium: Mustapha Seffouhi Stadium; Referee: Mohamed Bichari

19 May 2012 Round 30	MC Oran	1–5	CA Batna	Oran
15:00	Sandaogo 22'	Report	Merazka 12'; Messadia 12', 76', 78'; Saidi 85'	Stadium: Stade Ahmed Zabana; Referee: Sofiane Bousseter

== Algerian Cup ==
30 December 2011 Round of 64	CA Batna	1–1 (a.e.t.) (3–4 p)	CS Constantine	Batna
14:30	Lemaici 42' (o.g.)	Report	Ziti 88' (pen.)	Stadium: November 1, 1954 Stadium; Referee: Merzak Halalchi

== Squad information ==
=== Playing statistics ===
No.	Pos	Nat	Player	Total		Ligue 1		Algerian Cup	
No.	Pos	Nat	Player	Apps	Goals	Apps	Goals	Apps	Goals
Goalkeepers
1	GK	(Algeria) ALG	Abderrahmane Boultif	14	0	13	0	1	0
16	GK	(Algeria) ALG	Yacine Babouche	13	0	12	0	1	0
40	GK	(Algeria) ALG	Oussama Methazem	5	0	5	0	0	0
Defenders
	DF	(Algeria) ALG	Rafik Boudiaf	2	0	2	0	0	0
19	DF	(Algeria) ALG	Mourad Boudjelida	18	0	17	0	1	0
12	DF	(Algeria) ALG	Nassim Oussalah	9	0	9	0	0	0
24	DF	(Algeria) ALG	Youcef Benamara	24	2	24	2	0	0
21	DF	(Algeria) ALG	Amar Boutria	15	0	14	0	1	0
3	DF	(Algeria) ALG	Billel Boulediab	15	0	15	0	0	0
11	DF	(Algeria) ALG	Saadeddine Maidi	16	2	15	2	1	0
2	DF	(Algeria) ALG	Brahim Sifour	5	0	5	0	0	0
Midfielders
20	MF	(Algeria) ALG	Abdelmalek Bitam	11	0	10	0	1	0
31	MF	(Mauritania) MTN	Dahmed Ould Teguedi	1	0	1	0	0	0
8	MF	(Algeria) ALG	Mohamed Saidi	22	2	21	2	1	0
7	MF	(Algeria) ALG	Ali Daira	26	1	25	1	1	0
10	MF	(Togo) TOG	Sapol Mani	12	1	12	1	0	0
6	MF	(Algeria) ALG	Hamza Heriat	27	1	26	1	1	0
22	MF	(Algeria) ALG	Amine Elaid Fezzani	26	0	25	0	1	0
4	MF	(Algeria) ALG	Imad Bella	27	0	26	0	1	0
13	MF	(Algeria) ALG	Said Bouchouk	15	2	14	2	1	0
26	MF	(Cameroon) CMR	Koufana Eyengue	18	0	18	0	0	0
23	MF	(Algeria) ALG	Fawzi Medjdoub	1	0	1	0	0	0
Forwards
30	FW	(Algeria) ALG	Adel El Hadi	14	5	14	5	0	0
28	FW	(Algeria) ALG	Hamza Fares Amrane	15	3	14	3	1	0
27	FW	(Algeria) ALG	Abdelmoutaleb Ghodbane	5	0	5	0	0	0
17	FW	(Algeria) ALG	Ahmed Messadia	24	12	23	12	1	0
14	FW	(Algeria) ALG	Hichem Merazka	26	7	26	7	0	0
31	FW	(Algeria) ALG	Nadir Abid Charef	4	0	4	0	0	0
	FW	(Algeria) ALG	Mohamed Zekri	2	0	2	0	0	0
Players transferred out during the season

Last updated: 3 December 2017
Source: fr.soccerway.com

== Transfers ==
=== In ===
Date	Pos	Player	From club	Transfer fee	Source
10 August 2011	MF	(Mauritania) Dahmed Ould Teguedi	(Morocco) Olympic Club de Safi	Free transfer	
10 August 2011	MF	(Algeria) Hamza Heriat	USM Alger	Free transfer	
10 August 2011	MF	(Cameroon) Koufana Eyengue	(Cameroon) Oryx Douala	Free transfer	
3 January 2012	FW	(Algeria) Adel El Hadi	USM Annaba	Free transfer	
7 January 2012	DF	(Algeria) Nassim Oussalah	NA Hussein Dey	Free transfer	
11 January 2012	MF	(Togo) Sapol Mani	(Libya) Al-Ittihad	Free transfer	
