= 2012–13 Algerian Ligue Professionnelle 1 =

Algerian Ligue Professionnelle 1
- Season: 2012–13
- Dates: 7 September 2012 – 21 May 2013
- Champions: ES Sétif (6th title)
- Promoted: CA Bordj Bou Arréridj; JS Saoura; USM Bel-Abbès
- Champions League: ES Sétif
- Matches: 128
- Goals: 233 (1.82 per match)
- Top goalscorer: Moustapha Djallit (14 goals)
- Biggest home win: ES Sétif 6–0 CA Batna (September 18); USM Alger 6-0 USM Bel-Abbès (December 7)
- Biggest away win: WA Tlemcen 0–3 MC Alger (September 15); CA Batna 0–3 USM Alger (September 29)
- Highest scoring: CS Constantine 4–3 MC Oran (September 18)
- Longest winning run: ES Sétif (5); USM Alger (4)
- Longest unbeaten run: MC Alger (8); MC El Eulma(8); USM Alger (6)
- Longest losing run: WA Tlemcen (3); USM Bel-Abbès (3)

The 2012–13 Algerian Ligue Professionnelle 1 was the 51st season of the Algerian Ligue Professionnelle 1 since its establishment in 1962. A total of 16 teams contested the league, with ES Sétif as the defending champions. The league began on September 8, 2012.

== Team summaries ==
=== Promotion and relegation ===
Teams promoted from 2011–12 Algerian Ligue Professionnelle 2

- CA Bordj Bou Arréridj
- USM Bel-Abbès
- JS Saoura

Teams relegated to 2012-13 Algerian Ligue Professionnelle 2

- AS Khroub
- NA Hussein Dey
- MC Saïda

=== Stadiums and locations ===
Location of (qualified) teams in the Ligue Professionnelle 1 2012–13

Team	Location	Stadium	Stadium capacity
ASO Chlef	Chlef	Stade Mohamed Boumezrag	17,000
CA Batna	Batna	Stade Seffouhi	5,000
CA Bordj Bou Arréridj	Bordj Bou Arréridj	Stade 20 Août 1955 (Bordj Bou Arréridj)	20,000
CR Belouizdad	Algiers	Stade 20 Août 1955	21,000
CS Constantine	Constantine	Stade Mohamed Hamlaoui	40,000
ES Sétif	Sétif	Stade 8 Mai 1945	25,000
JS Kabylie	Tizi Ouzou	Stade 1er Novembre	20,000
JSM Béjaïa	Béjaïa	Stade de l'Unité Maghrébine	18,000
JS Saoura	Méridja	Stade 20 Août 1955 (Béchar)	20,000
MC Alger	Algiers	Stade 5 Juillet 1962	76,000
MC El Eulma	El Eulma	Stade Messaoud Zougar	25,000
MC Oran	Oran	Stade Ahmed Zabana	40,000
USM Bel-Abbès	Sidi Bel Abbès	Stade 24 Fevrier 1956	45,000
USM Alger	Algiers	Stade Omar Hamadi	15,000
USM El Harrach	Algiers	Stade 1er Novembre	8,000
WA Tlemcen	Tlemcen	Stade Akid Lotfi	30,000

=== Personnel and kits ===
Note: Flags indicate national team as has been defined under FIFA eligibility rules. Players may hold more than one non-FIFA nationality.

Team	Manager	Captain	Kit manufacturer	Shirt sponsor
ASO Chlef	(Algeria) Rachid Belhout	(Algeria) Samir Zaoui	(Spain) Joma	Nedjma
CA Bordj Bou Arréridj	(Algeria) Toufik Rouabah	(Algeria) Djamel Benchergui	(Italy) Kappa	
CA Batna	(Algeria) Rachid Bouarrata	(Algeria) Mohamed Saïdi	(Spain) Joma	Hodna Lait
CR Belouizdad	(Italy) Guglielmo Arena	(Algeria) Abdelkrim Mameri	(Spain) Joma	Nedjma, CNEP, Le Temps, Wakt El Djazair, Bellat
CS Constantine	(France) Roger Lemerre	(Algeria) Yacine Bezzaz	(Algeria) KCS	Hodna Lait
ES Sétif	(France) Hubert Velud	(Algeria) Mourad Delhoum	(Spain) Joma	Djezzy, Groupe Safcer, Société des ciments de Aïn El Kebira, Echorouk
JS Kabylie	(Italy) Enrico Fabbro	(Algeria) Ali Rial	(Algeria) Altea	Nedjma, Peugeot, Echorouk
JS Saoura	(Algeria) Chérif Hadjar	(Algeria) Kaddour Beldjilali	(Algeria) Baeko	Zerouati
JSM Béjaïa	(France) Alain Michel	(Algeria) Brahim Zafour	(Italy) Kappa	Nedjma, General Emballage, Ramdy, Cevital, ECI Boudiab
MC Alger	(France) Jean-Paul Rabier	(Algeria) Réda Babouche	(Spain) Joma	Djezzy, Opel, Peaudouce, Echorouk TV
MC El Eulma	(Algeria) Abdelkader Yaïche	(Algeria) Abdenour Mahfoudi	(Germany) Adidas	Nedjma, MaproGaz, Trefisoud
MC Oran	(Switzerland) Raoul Savoy	(Algeria) Hichem Mezaïr	(Algeria) Baeko	Nedjma, Ifri, Hodna Lait, Propal Algérie, Aigle Azur, Zerouati
USM Alger	(Argentina) Miguel Angel Gamondi	(Algeria) Noureddine Daham	(Germany) Adidas	Sonelgaz, Djezzy, Le Temps, Wakt El Djazair, ETRHB
USM Bel-Abbès	(Algeria) Fouad Bouali	(Algeria) Smaïl Diss	(Germany) Adidas	ENIE
USM El Harrach	(Algeria) Boualem Charef	(Algeria) Azzedine Doukha	(France) Patrick	Nedjma
WA Tlemcen	(Algeria) Abdelkader Amrani	(Algeria) Anwar Mohamed Boudjakdji	(United States) Sarson	Aigle Azur

=== Managerial changes ===
Managerial changes during the 2012–13 campaign.

==== Pre-season ====
Team	Outgoing manager	Manner of departure	Date of vacancy	Position in table	Incoming manager	Date of appointment
USM Bel-Abbès	(Algeria) Abdelkrim Benyellès	Sacked	21 July 2012	Pre-season	(Algeria) Fouad Bouali	23 July 2012
MC Alger	(France) Patrick Liewig	Sacked	18 August 2012	Pre-season	(France) Jean-Paul Rabier	21 August 2012

==== During the season ====
Team	Outgoing manager	Manner of departure	Date of vacancy	Position in table	Incoming manager	Date of appointment
MC Alger	(France) Jean-Paul Rabier	Sacked	23 September 2012	3rd	(Algeria) Djamel Menad	24 September 2012
CA Bordj Bou Arreridj	(Algeria) Toufik Rouabah	Sacked	1 October 2012	14th	(Algeria) Rachid Bouarrata	12 October 2012
MC Oran	(Switzerland) Raoul Savoy	Demission	8 October 2012	15th	(Algeria) Abdellah Mecheri	10 October 2012
CA Batna	(Algeria) Rachid Bouarrata	Demission	12 October 2012	14th	(Algeria) Toufik Rouabah	12 October 2012
WA Tlemcen	(Algeria) Abdelkader Amrani	Demission	13 October 2012	13th	(Algeria) Kheireddine Kherris	13 October 2012
USM Alger	(Argentina) Miguel Gamondi	Sacked	16 October 2012	10th	(France) Rolland Courbis	24 October 2012
ASO Chlef	(Algeria) Rachid Belhout	Demission	23 October 2012	13th	(Algeria) Nour Benzekri	16 November 2012
CR Belouizdad	(Italy) Guglielmo Arena	Sacked	23 October 2012	9th	(Algeria) Fouad Bouali	7 November 2012
MC El Eulma	(Algeria) Abdelkader Yaïche	Sacked	29 October 2012	5th	(Algeria) Rachid Belhout	3 November 2012
USM Bel-Abbès	(Algeria) Fouad Bouali	Demission	30 October 2012	14th	(Algeria) Abdelkader Yaïche	14 November 2012
MC Oran	(Algeria) Abdellah Mecheri	Sacked	5 November 2012	14th	(Algeria) Djamel Benchadli	5 November 2012
WA Tlemcen	(Algeria) Kheireddine Kherris	Sacked	14 November 2012	16th	(Algeria) Abdelkrim Benyellès	14 November 2012
JS Kabylie	(Italy) Enrico Fabbro	Sacked	17 November 2012	11th	(Algeria) Nacer Sandjak	23 November 2012

== League table ==
Pos	Team	Pld	W	D	L	GF	GA	GD	Pts	Qualification or relegation
1	ES Sétif (C)	30	18	5	7	55	27	+28	59	Qualification for the Champions League preliminary round
2	USM El Harrach (Note: USM El Harrach, the 2012–13 Algerian Ligue Professionnelle 1 runner-up, withdrew after the draw was held. Sporting Praia Cruz, the 2013 São Tomé and Príncipe Championship champion, were allowed by the CAF to replace them in the draw.)	30	17	6	7	38	22	+16	57	Qualification for the Champions League preliminary round
3	CS Constantine	30	13	13	4	37	20	+17	52	Qualification for the Confederation Cup preliminary round
4	USM Alger (Note: USM Alger, the 2012–13 Algerian Cup winner, withdrew before the start of the competition.)	30	15	6	9	32	15	+17	51	Qualification for the Confederation Cup preliminary round
5	MC Alger (Note: In a match between USM El Harrach and MC Alger the last refused to play in the Stade 1er Novembre 1954, but the LFP refused to change the pitch, Despite the presence of USM El Harrach, the referees and supporters, but the Mouloudia team did not attend. the club will receive a penalty, according to Article 84 of the Disciplinary Code of the Algerian Football Federation (FAF), "a match lost by penalty. Defalcation of three (03) points, One million dinars (1,000,000 dinars) fine for the club. "The offending club will be deprived of its compensation due for television rights.)	30	15	8	7	33	24	+9	50	
6	CR Belouizdad	30	11	11	8	32	26	+6	44	
7	JS Kabylie	30	11	8	11	32	31	+1	41	
8	MC El Eulma	30	9	13	8	29	27	+2	40	
9	JS Saoura	30	10	8	12	28	26	+2	38	
10	ASO Chlef	30	10	8	12	26	29	−3	38	
11	JSM Béjaïa	30	9	11	10	28	32	−4	38	
12	MC Oran	30	8	10	12	33	41	−8	34	
13	CA Bordj Bou Arréridj	30	7	12	11	20	26	−6	33	
14	CA Batna (R)	30	6	8	16	20	46	−26	26	Relegation to Ligue Professionnelle 2
15	WA Tlemcen (R)	30	6	6	18	19	43	−24	24	Relegation to Ligue Professionnelle 2
16	USM Bel-Abbès (R)	30	5	7	18	18	45	−27	22	Relegation to Ligue Professionnelle 2

Updated to match(es) played on 21 May 2013. Source: DZFoot
Rules for classification: 1) points; 2) head-to-head points; 3) head-to-head goal difference; 4) goal difference; 5) total goals; 6) fairplay ranking; 7) playoff.
(C) Champions; (R) Relegated

== Season statistics ==
=== Hat-tricks ===
Player	For	Against	Score	Date
(Algeria) Moustapha Djallit	MC Alger	WA Tlemcen	0–3	15 September 2012
(Algeria) Ahmed Gasmi	USM Alger	WA Tlemcen	4–0	3 November 2012

== See also ==
- 2012–13 Algerian Ligue Professionnelle 2
- 2012–13 Algerian Cup
