= Tafer =

Tafer is a surname. Notable people with the surname include:

- Akim Tafer (born 1967), also Hakim Tafer, French boxer of Algerian descent
- Aziz Tafer (born 1984), French-Algerian football player
- Yannis Tafer (born 1991), French football player

== See also ==
- Tafers, municipality in the district of Sense in the canton of Fribourg in Switzerland
