= Abdelhadi Kada Benyacine =

Algerian footballer (born 1990)

Personal information
- Full name: Abdelhadi Kada Benyacine
- Date of birth: August 5, 1990 (age 36)
- Place of birth: Tlemcen, Algeria
- Height: 1.77 m (5 ft 9 1/2 in)
- Position: Defender

Senior career*
Years	Team	Apps	(Gls)
2009–2012	WA Tlemcen	26	(0)
2012–2013	USM Bel-Abbès	19	(0)
2013–2015	WA Tlemcen	-	(-)
2016	GC Mascara	-	(-)
2017-2018	CA Batna	-	(-)

International career^{‡}
2007	Algeria U20	1	(0)
- * Club domestic league appearances and goals as of 00:00, Jan 1, 2016 (EST) ‡ National team caps and goals as of 00:00, Jan 1, 2016 (UTC)

Abdelhadi Kada Benyacine (born August 5, 1990) was an Algerian football player. He retired in 2018.

On May 28, 2010, Kada Benyacine made his senior debut for WA Tlemcen as a 68th-minute substitute in a league match against MC El Eulma.

== International career ==
In 2007, Kada Benyacine was a member of the Algeria national under-20 football team.
