= Ernest Yélémou =

Burkinabé footballer

Personal information
- Full name: Ernest Grégoire Yélémou
- Date of birth: July 13, 1988 (age 38)
- Place of birth: Burkina Faso
- Height: 1.90 m (6 ft 3 in)
- Position: Striker

Youth career
- Santos FC (Ouagadougou)

Senior career*
| Years | Team | Apps | (Gls) |
| | Santos FC (Ouagadougou) | - | (-) |
| | Rail Club du Kadiogo | - | (-) |
| | USFA Ouagadougou | - | (-) |
| 2012–20xx | JSM Béjaïa | 4 | (2) |
- * Club domestic league appearances and goals as of 00:00, February 26, 2012 (UTC)

Ernest Grégoire Yélémou (born July 13, 1988) is a Burkinabé professional footballer who plays as a striker. He made a scoring debut for Bejaia in their 3–2 defeat at home to ES Sétif in the 2011–12 Algerian Ligue Professionnelle 1 on January 31.

== Club career ==
On January 12, 2012, Yélémou signed for Algerian club JSM Bejaia. On January 31, 2012, he made his debut for the club as a starter in a league game against ES Setif, scoring a goal in the 40th minute of the game.

=== Statistics ===
As of 26 February 2012

| Club performance | | | League | | Cup | | Continental | | Total | |
| Season | Club | League | Apps | Goals | Apps | Goals | Apps | Goals | Apps | Goals |
| Algeria | | | League | | Algerian Cup | | Africa | | Total | |
|---|---|---|---|---|---|---|---|---|---|---|
| 2011–12 | JSM Béjaïa | Algerian Ligue Professionnelle 1 | 5 | 2 | 0 | 0 | 2 | 2 | 5 | 2 |
| Total | Algeria | | 5 | 2 | 0 | 0 | 2 | 2 | 5 | 2 |
| Career total | | | 4 | 2 | 0 | 0 | 2 | 2 | 5 | 2 |
