= Saïd Bouchouk =

Algerian footballer (born 1986)

Personal information
- Full name: Saïd Bouchouk
- Date of birth: December 29, 1986 (age 39)
- Place of birth: El Eulma, Algeria
- Height: 1.68 m (5 ft 6 in)
- Position: Forward

Youth career
- FC Bir El Arch

Senior career*
| Years | Team | Apps | (Gls) |
| 2005–2010 | FC Bir El Arch | - | (-) |
| 2010–2013 | CA Batna | 47 | (2) |
| 2012 | → Al-Qadisiyah (loan) | 3 | (1) |
| 2013 | JS Kabylie | 0 | (0) |
| 2014– | RC Arbaâ | | |
- * Club domestic league appearances and goals as of 00:00, May 4, 2012 (UTC)

Saïd Bouchouk (born December 29, 1986) is an Algerian football player.

== Club career ==
Born in El Eulma, Bouchouk began his career in the junior ranks FC Bir El Arch. In 2005, he was promoted to the senior side, where he spent the next five seasons. In 2010, he had a successful trial with Ligue 2 side CA Batna, signing a four-year contract with the club.

On January 29, 2012, Bouchouk was loaned by CA Batna to Saudi Professional League club Al-Qadisiyah FC until the end of the season.

== International career ==
On October 25, 2011, Bouchouk received a surprise call up from Vahid Halilhodžić to the Algerian National Team for a pair of friendlies against Tunisia and Cameroon. He did not play in the first game against Tunisia, remaining on the bench as Algeria won 1–0. The second game against Cameroon was cancelled and replaced with an intra-squad scrimmage. Coming at half-time, Bouchouk scored a goal and had two assists as his Algeria White team won 4–1 against Algeria Green.
