= Dahmed Ould Teguedi =

Mauritanian footballer

Personal information
- Full name: Sid'Aahmed Ould Teguedi
- Date of birth: November 15, 1984 (age 41)
- Place of birth: Nouakchott, Mauritania
- Height: 1.76 m (5 ft 9 in)
- Position: Center back

Senior career*
Years	Team	Apps	(Gls)
2004–2007	ASAC Concorde		
2007–2009	MC Saïda	51	(8)
2009–2011	Olympic Safi	5	
2011–2011	CA Batna	2	(0)
2012–2013	MC Saïda	11	(1)
2013–2017	Nouakchott Kings	1	

International career
2008–2012	Mauritania	12	(3)

Managerial career
- 2017–: Mauritania Under 17
- * Club domestic league appearances and goals

Dahmed Ould Teguedi (born November 15, 1984) is a former Mauritanian professional football player and current coach of the Mauritanian under 17 national team. He played for MC Saïda and CA Batna in Algerian Ligue Professionnelle 1, Olympic Club de Safi in Botola and finally retiring in his hometown club Nouakchott Kings in Ligue 1 Mauritania.
