= Mohamed Marko Camara =

Guinean footballer

Mohamed Camara
Personal information
- Full name: Mohamed Marko Camara
- Date of birth: 5 May 1985 (age 41)
- Place of birth: Conakry, Guinea
- Height: 1.79 m (5 ft 10 in)
- Position: Forward

Senior career*
Years	Team	Apps	(Gls)
- Fello Star
2007–2008	Bizertin	14	(2)
- Fello Star
2011–2012	Saïda	6	(0)
- * Club domestic league appearances and goals

Mohamed Marko Camara (born 5 May 1985) is a Guinean former footballer. He spent one season with Algerian side Saïda.

== Career statistics ==
=== Club ===
Appearances and goals by club, season and competition
Club	Season	League			Cup		Other		Total	
Club	Season	Division	Apps	Goals	Apps	Goals	Apps	Goals	Apps	Goals
Bizertin	2007–08	Tunisian Ligue 1	14	2	0	0	0	0	14	2
Saïda	2011–12	Algerian Ligue 1	6	0	0	0	0	0	6	0
Career total			20	2	0	0	0	0	20	2
