= Rafik Boulaïnceur =

Algerian footballer (born 1991)

Personal information
- Full name: Rafik Boulaïnceur
- Date of birth: 11 December 1991 (age 34)
- Place of birth: Algeria
- Height: 1.80 m (5 ft 11 in)
- Position: Forward

Team information
- Current team: NRB Teleghma
- Number: 27

Youth career
- JSM Béjaïa

Senior career*
| Years | Team | Apps | (Gls) |
| 2009–2012 | JSM Béjaïa | 48 | (9) |
| 2012–2013 | CA Batna | 15 | (3) |
| 2013 | JS Kabylie | 14 | (0) |
| 2013–2014 | MO Béjaïa | 22 | (0) |
| 2014–2015 | CA Batna | ? | (?) |
| 2015–2016 | JSM Skikda | ? | (?) |
| 2016–2018 | MC El Eulma | ? | (?) |
| 2018–2020 | NC Magra | 18 | (1) |
| 2020–2021 | MSP Batna | ? | (?) |
| 2021– | NRB Teleghma | 19 | (7) |

International career^{‡}
| 2010– | Algeria U23 | 5 | (2) |
- * Club domestic league appearances and goals as of 9 April 2022 ‡ National team caps and goals as of 2020

Rafik Boulaïnceur (born 11 December 1991) is an Algerian football player who currently plays for NRB Teleghma in the Algerian Ligue 2.
