= Adel El Hadi =

Algerian footballer (born 1980)

Personal information
- Full name: Adel El Hadi
- Date of birth: 18 January 1980 (age 46)
- Place of birth: Biskra, Algeria
- Height: 1.78 m (5 ft 10 in)
- Position: Forward

Senior career*
| Years | Team | Apps | (Gls) |
| 1998–2000 | US Biskra | | |
| 2000–2001 | USM Annaba | 25 | (6) |
| 2001–2003 | CR Belouizdad | 24 | (1) |
| 2003–2005 | USM Annaba | 52 | (27) |
| 2005 | ES Setif | 10 | (1) |
| 2006 | US Biskra | 11 | (1) |
| 2006–2009 | USM Annaba | 78 | (31) |
| 2009–2010 | JSM Béjaïa | 22 | (4) |
| 2010–2011 | CA Bordj Bou Arreridj | 25 | (2) |
| 2011–2012 | USM Annaba | 9 | (0) |
| 2012–2013 | CA Batna | 11 | (5) |
| 2013–2014 | ES Mostaganem | | |
| 2014–2015 | WA Tlemcen | | |

International career^{‡}
| 2000–2005 | Algeria | 5 | (0) |
- * Club domestic league appearances and goals as of 20:00, May 5, 2012 (UTC) ‡ National team caps and goals as of 20:00, May 5, 2012 (UTC)

Adel El Hadi (born 18 January 1980) is an Algerian former football player.

== National team statistics ==
Algeria national team
| Year | Apps | Goals |
|---|---|---|
| 2000 | 1 | 0 |
| 2001 | 0 | 0 |
| 2002 | 2 | 0 |
| 2003 | 0 | 0 |
| 2004 | 1 | 0 |
| 2005 | 1 | 0 |
| Total | 5 | 0 |

== Honours ==
- Top scorer of the Algerian league in 2003/2004 with 17 goals for USM Annaba
- Top scorer of the Algerian second division in 2006/2007 with 19 goals for USM Annaba
- Has 5 caps for the Algerian National Team
