= Jean-Paul Rabier =

French football manager (born 1955)

Personal information
- Date of birth: 25 January 1955 (age 71)
- Place of birth: Vendôme, France
- Position: Midfielder

Team information
- Current team: MC Alger

Senior career*
Years	Team	Apps	(Gls)
1972–1979	Rennes		
1979–1982	Valenciennes		
1982–1984	Laval	65	(5)
1984–1985	Lens		

Managerial career
- 1988–1989: Guingamp
- 1990–1992: La Roche VF
- 1994–1995: Rouen
- 1995–1997: Besançon
- 1998–2000: AS Vitré
- 2000–2001: Angers (assistant)
- 2002–2004: Burkina Faso
- 2004–2005: MC Alger
- 2006–2008: Alkhor
- 2008: F.C. Ryūkyū
- 2010–2011: Madagascar
- 2012–: MC Alger
- * Club domestic league appearances and goals

Jean-Paul Rabier (born 25 January 1955) is a French football manager and former player.

== Biography ==
In April 1971, while playing for Stade Lannionnais, Jean-Paul Rabier took part in the National Cadets Cup with the Ligue de l'Ouest, in a team whose goalkeeper was Pierrick Hiard. He left Lannion for Rennes in 1972. A defensive midfielder, he won the Gambardella Cup in 1973 with Stade Rennais and played 150 matches with his training club before moving to US Valenciennes-Anzin in 1979.

In 1982, he joined Laval, then coached by Michel Le Milinaire, in Division 1. He was on the field during his team's remarkable achievement in the 1983-84 UEFA Cup season, where they faced the formidable Dynamo Kyiv team, featuring Blokhin and Zavarov. The first leg in the Soviet Union ended in a flattering 0-0 draw, after which the courageous Laval players triumphed in the return leg, thanks to José Souto's only goal of the match, in front of a packed Francis-Le-Basser stadium for the occasion.

== Career ==
Rabier played for Rennes, Valenciennes, Laval and Lens.

He coached Guingamp, La Roche VF, Rouen, Besançon, AS Vitré, Burkina Faso, MC Alger, Alkhor, F.C. Ryūkyū. He was appointed manager of the Madagascar national football team in April 2010.
