= Kheireddine Kherris =

Algerian footballer (born 1973)

Personal information
- Full name: Kheireddine Anouar Kherris
- Date of birth: 8 May 1973 (age 53)
- Place of birth: Tlemcen, Algeria
- Height: 1.76 m (5 ft 9 in)
- Position: Right-back

Team information
- Current team: JSM Skikda (assistant)

Senior career*
Years	Team	Apps	(Gls)
1992–2010	WA Tlemcen	500	(5)

International career
1992–1998	Algeria	18	(1)

Managerial career
- 2007–2012: WA Tlemcen (assistant)
- 2012: WA Tlemcen
- 2012–2017: WA Tlemcen (assistant)
- 2017–2018: WA Tlemcen
- * Club domestic league appearances and goals

Kheireddine Anouar Kherris (born 8 May 1973 in Tlemcen) is an Algerian former footballer.

He has been assistant manager and manager of WA Tlemcen.

== Career statistics ==
Scores and results list Algeria's goal tally first.

No	Date	Venue	Opponent	Score	Result	Competition
1.	13 July 1997	July 5, 1962 Stadium, Algiers, Algeria	Mali	1–0	1–0	1998 Africa Cup of Nations qualification
