= Aziz Tafer =

French-Algerian footballer (born 1984)

Personal information
- Full name: Mohamed Abdelaziz Tafer
- Date of birth: June 17, 1984 (age 42)
- Place of birth: Nice, France
- Height: 1.80 m (5 ft 11 in)
- Position: Midfielder

Youth career
- 2000–2005: AS Monaco

Senior career*
Years	Team	Apps	(Gls)
2005	IFK Norrköping		
2005–2007	SV Elversberg	4	(0)
2007	ES Sétif		
2008	FC Fribourg		
2008–2012	Gloria Buzău	8	(0)
2012–2014	CS Constantine	16	(0)
2014–2015	Grenoble	16	(0)
Total		44	(0)
- * Club domestic league appearances and goals

Aziz Tafer (born June 17, 1984) is a French-Algerian former professional footballer who played as a midfielder.

== Career ==
Tafer played with the squad number 26 for CS Constantine in the Algerian Ligue 1, the manager of the team being Roger Lemerre. In July 2014, he joined the Grenoble in the French fourth division CFA.

== Honours ==
ES Sétif

- Algerian League: 2006–07
- Arab Champions League: 2006–07
