= William Yabeun =

Cameroonian footballer

Personal information
- Full name: William Yabeun
- Date of birth: 15 February 1987 (age 39)
- Place of birth: Yaoundé
- Height: 1.87 m (6 ft 1 1/2 in)
- Position: Forward

Team information
- Current team: Ethiopian Coffee F.C.

Senior career*
Years	Team	Apps	(Gls)
–2009	Canon Yaoundé	-	(-)
2009–2011	Mağusa TG	58	(1)
2011–2012	JSM Béjaïa	18	(4)
2012–2013	WA Tlemcen	12	(0)
2015–	Ethiopian Coffee	0	(0)

International career
	Cameroon U20	-	(-)
	Cameroon U23	-	(-)
- * Club domestic league appearances and goals as of 21:50, 20 September 2011 (UTC)

William Yabeun (born 15 March 1987) is a Cameroon football player who currently plays for Ethiopian Coffee F.C. in the Ethiopian Premier League.

== Club career ==
On 30 June 2011 Yabeun signed a three-year contract with JSM Béjaïa of the Algerian Ligue Professionnelle 1, replacing compatriot Yannick N'Djeng.

== International career ==
Yabeun has represented Cameroon at the Under-20 and Under-23 level.
