= Karim Naït Yahia =

Algerian footballer (born 1980)

Personal information
- Full name: Karim Naït Yahia
- Date of birth: December 19, 1980 (age 45)
- Place of birth: Akbou, Algeria
- Position: Midfielder

Senior career*
| Years | Team | Apps | (Gls) |
| 2005–2007 | JSM Béjaïa | - | (-) |
| 2007–2008 | JSM Chéraga | - | (-) |
| 2008–2009 | MO Béjaïa | - | (-) |
| 2009–2011 | AS Khroub | 53 | (9) |
| 2011–2014 | CS Constantine | 52 | (3) |
| 2014–2015 | ASO Chlef | 16 | (1) |
- * Club domestic league appearances and goals as of 00:00, November 26, 2018 (UTC)

Karim Naït Yahia (Arabic: كريم نايت يحي; born December 19, 1980, in Akbou) is an Algerian football player.

== Club career ==
In July 2011, Naït Yahia joined newly promoted CS Constantine.
