= Rachid Bouarrata =

Algerian football manager

Mourad Karouf
Personal information
- Date of birth: 26 November 1958 (age 67)

Managerial career
- Years: Team
- 2011–2012: CS Constantine
- 2012: CA Batna
- 2015–2016: CA Batna
- 2016: MC El Eulma
- 2017: US Biskra
- 2018: MO Béjaïa
- 2019: AS Khroub

Rachid Bouarrata (Arabic: رشيد بوعراطة, born 26 November 1958) is an Algerian association football manager and former player. He has among others coached CS Constantine in the Algerian Ligue Professionnelle 1.
