= Mustapha Seffouhi Stadium =

Sports stadium in Algeria

- Interactive map of Mustapha Seffouhi Stadium
- Location: Batna, Algeria
- Coordinates: 35°33′28″N 6°10′49″E
- Owner: APC of Batna
- Operator: APC of Batna
- Capacity: 5,000
- Surface: Artificial turf

Tenant
- CA Batna

Mustapha Seffouhi Stadium (Arabic: ملعب مصطفى سفوحي) is a multi-use stadium in Batna, Algeria. It is used mostly for football matches and is the home ground of CA Batna. The stadium holds 5,000 people.

== See also ==
- 1st November Stadium
