= Toufik Rouabah =

Algerian football manager

Personal information
- Date of birth: 6 May 1970 (age 56)

Managerial career
- Years: Team
- 2011–2012: MC Saïda
- 2012: CA Batna
- 2012: CA Bordj Bou Arréridj
- 2012: CA Batna
- 2013–2014: Al-Taawoun FC
- 2014: Ettifaq FC
- 2016: CA Batna
- 2017: Al Raed FC
- 2018–2019: Olympique de Médéa
- 2017: Al-Orobah FC
- 2017–2018: JS Saoura
- 2018–2019: WA Tlemcen
- 2020: NA Hussein Dey
- 2021: JSM Skikda
- 2022: HB Chelghoum Laïd
- 2024–2025: Al-Ain

Toufik Rouabah (Arabic: توفيق روابح; born 6 May 1970) is an Algerian football manager.
