= Nasereddine El Bahari =

Algerian footballer (born 1986)

Personal information
- Full name: Nasereddine El Bahari
- Date of birth: April 11, 1986 (age 40)
- Place of birth: Aïn Témouchent, Algeria
- Position: Forward

Team information
- Current team: OM Arzew
- Number: 21

Senior career*
Years	Team	Apps	(Gls)
2006–2007	NRB Bethioua		(10)
2007–2012	MC Oran	65	(17)
2012–2013	USM Bel Abbès	27	(4)
2014	ASM Oran	11	(1)
2014–2015	WA Tlemcen	22	(2)
2015–2016	ES Mostaganem		
2016–2018	OM Arzew		
2018–2019	GC Mascara		
2019–	OM Arzew		
- * Club domestic league appearances and goals as of 00:00, January 1, 2019 (UTC)

Nasereddine El Bahari (born April 11, 1986, in Aïn Témouchent) is an Algerian footballer. He currently plays for OM Arzew in the Algerian Ligue Professionnelle 1.

== Club career ==
On June 24, 2012, El Bahari signed a three-year contract with USM Bel Abbès.
