= 1 November 1954 Stadium (Batna) =

Multi-use stadium in Batna, Algeria

Coordinates: 35°33′26″N 6°11′16″E

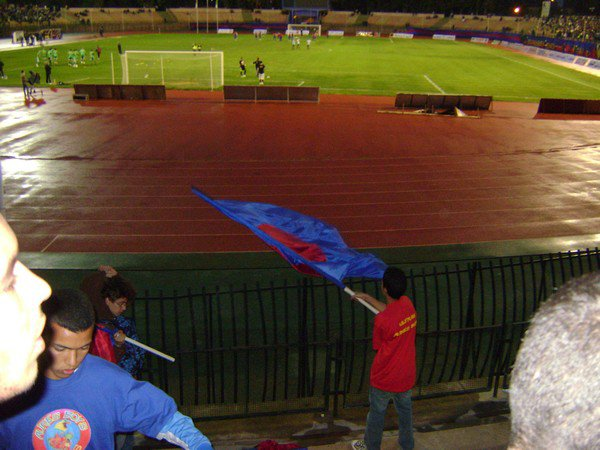
- Interactive map of 1 November 1954 Stadium (Batna)
- Full name: 1 November 1954 Stadium
- Location: Batna, Algeria
- Owner: APC of Batna
- Capacity: 5000
- Surface: Grass

Construction
- Groundbreaking: 1968
- Built: 1979
- Opened: 1983
- Renovated: 1987, 1996, 2004, 2016

Tenants
- CA Batna; MSP Batna

1 November 1954 Stadium (Arabic: ملعب 1 نوفمبر 1954), or officially Stade 1er-novembre-1954, is a multi-use stadium in Batna, Algeria. It is currently used mostly for football matches and is the home ground of MSP Batna of the Algerian Championnat National. The stadium holds 8000 spectators.

The stadium is named for the date of the founding of the National Liberation Front, which obtained independence for Algeria from France.

== Matches ==
The stadium has hosted one game of the Algeria national football team, against East Germany in 1985.

=== Club ===
Event	Date	Time (CET)	Team #1	Result	Team #2	Round	Spectators
1983–84 Algerian Cup	25 May 1984	15:00	MP Oran	2–1 (a.e.t.)	JH Djazaïr	Final	25 000

=== National ===
Event	Date	Time (CET)	Team #1	Result	Team #2	Round	Spectators
Friendly	13 March 1985	-:-	Algeria	1–1	East Germany	One game	30 000

== See also ==
- Mustapha Seffouhi Stadium
