= Abdenour Hadiouche =

Algerian footballer (born 1984)

Personal information
- Full name: Abdenour Hadiouche
- Date of birth: December 30, 1984 (age 41)
- Place of birth: Bouïra, Algeria
- Position: Forward

Senior career*
Years	Team	Apps	(Gls)
2006–2007	OC Azazga	-	(-)
2007–2009	NA Hussein Dey	-	(-)
2009–2010	MC El Eulma	24	(4)
2010–2012	MC Saïda	34	(11)
2012	JS Kabylie	11	(0)
- * Club domestic league appearances and goals

Abdenour Hadiouche (born December 30, 1984) is an Algerian football player.

== Club career ==
On July 2, 2007, Hadiouche signed a two-year contract with NA Hussein Dey. The previous season, he finished as the top scorer of the Regionale II (Division 5) with OC Azazga after scoring 26 goals.
