= CA Bordj Bou Arréridj =

Association football club in Algeria

CABBA
- Full name: Chabab Ahly Bordj Bou Arréridj
- Nickname: The Yellow Locusts
- Founded: 1931; 94 years ago
- Ground: 20 August 1955 Stadium
- Capacity: 15,000
- League: Ligue Régional I
- 2023–24: Ligue Régional I, Batna, 12th
Home colours	Away colours

Chabab Ahly Bordj Bou Arréridj (Arabic: شباب أهلي برج بوعريريج), known as CA Bord Bou Arréridj or simply CABBA for short, is an Algerian football club based in Bordj Bou Arreridj. The club was founded in 1931 and its colours are yellow and black. Their home stadium, 20 August 1955 Stadium, has a capacity of 15,000 spectators. The club is currently playing in the Ligue Régional I.

== Honours ==
=== Domestic competitions ===
- Algerian Ligue Professionnelle 2
  - Champions (3): 1998, 2000–01, 2011–12
- Algerian Cup
  - Runners-up (1): 2008–09

=== Regional competitions ===
- Arab Champions League
  - Quarter-final: 2006–07

== Notable players ==
Below are the notable former players who have represented CA Bordj Bou Arréridj in league and international competition since the club's foundation in 1931. To appear in the section below, a player must have played in at least 100 official matches for the club or represented the national team for which the player is eligible during his stint with CA Bordj Bou Arréridj or following his departure.

For all notable CA Bordj Bou Arréridj players with Wikipedia articles, see Category:CA Bordj Bou Arréridj players.

- (Algeria) Abderahmane Hachoud
- (Algeria) Merouane Kial
- (Angola) Jaime Linares
- (Nigeria) Alhassane Issoufou

== Managers ==
- (Algeria) Azzedine Aït Djoudi (2005)
- (Romania) Petre Gigiu (2005)
- (France) Ladislas Lozano (26 Jan 2011 – 31 Dec 2011)
- (Algeria) Toufik Rouabah (27 June 2012 – 1 Oct 2012)
- (Algeria) Rachid Bouarrata (Oct 2012–1?)
- (Algeria) Abdelaziz Abbès (2 Oct 2012 – 20 Jan 2013)
- (Algeria) Abdelkader Amrani (21 Jan 2013 – 30 June 2013)
- (Algeria) Rachid Belhout (2 July 2013 – 20 Oct 2013)
- (Tunisia) Nabil Kouki (5 Nov 2013 – 16 Dec 2013)
- (Algeria) Mustapha Biskri (18 Dec 2013 – 14 March 2014)

== Rival clubs ==
- (Algeria) ES Setif (Derby)
- (Algeria) MC El Eulma (Rivalry)
- (Algeria) MO Béjaïa (Rivalry)
- (Algeria) AS Aïn M'lila (Rivalry)
