= CA Batna =

Algerian football club

- Full name: Chabab Aurès de Batna
- Nicknames: Chouaya, Les Cabistes
- Founded: 1932; 94 years ago
- Ground: 1 November 1954 Stadium
- Capacity: 20,000
- League: Ligue 2
- 2025–26: Ligue 2, Group Centre-east, 2nd
- Website: ca-batna.com
Home colours	Away colours

Chabab Aurès de Batna (Arabic: شباب أوراس باتنة), known as CA Batna or CAB for short, is an Algerian football club based in Batna, founded in 1932. The club colours are red and blue. Their home stadium, 1 November 1954 Stadium, has a capacity of 20,000 spectators. The club is currently playing the Algerian Ligue 2.

== History ==
In 1932, CA Batna was founded. On 5 August 2020, CA Batna were promoted to the Algerian Ligue 2.

== Players ==
=== Squad information ===
Players and squad numbers last updated on 24 April 2026.

No.	Player	Nat.	Position(s)	Date of birth (age)	Contract ends	Signed from
Goalkeepers
1	Yacine Sidi Salah	(Algeria)	GK	14 August 1996 (age 30)	2026	(Algeria) HB Chelghoum Laïd
16	Masten Becheker	(Algeria)	GK	20 August 1999 (age 27)	2026	(Algeria) AS Khroub
30	Anis Choulah	(Algeria)	GK	24 January 2005 (age 21)	2026	
Defenders
2	Adnene Ladjabi	(Algeria)	DF	11 November 1999 (age 26)	2026	(Algeria) JSM Tiaret
3	Fayssal Mekraz	(Algeria)	DF	5 June 1997 (age 29)	2026	(Algeria) RC Kouba
4	Hicham Lalaouna	(Algeria)	DF	18 May 1995 (age 31)	2026	(Algeria) US Souf
5	Mohamed Islem Ghecham	(Algeria)	DF	23 October 2004 (age 21)	2026	
12	Akram Boulemkhali	(Algeria)	DF	15 April 2002 (age 24)	2026	(Algeria) IB Khémis El Khechna
15	Mostefa Boussif	(Algeria)	DF	14 July 1997 (age 29)	2026	(Algeria) US Chaouia
17	Amir Belaili	(Algeria)	DF	10 February 1991 (age 35)	2026	Free agent
22	Abdennour Kherroubi	(Algeria)	DF	28 January 1999 (age 27)	2026	
Midfielders
6	Kamel Abdoune	(Algeria)	DM	21 October 2000 (age 25)	2026	(Algeria) GC Mascara
7	Hacène Ogbi	(Algeria)	AM	17 August 1989 (age 37)	2026	(Algeria) USM El Harrach
8	Aymene Rahmani	(Algeria)	AM	16 May 2001 (age 25)	2026	(Algeria) IB Khémis El Khechna
10	Adem Chaibi	(Algeria)	AM	11 October 2000 (age 25)	2026	(Algeria) USM Annaba
14	Mounib Benmerzoug	(Algeria)	AM	6 June 1995 (age 31)	2026	(Algeria) NA Hussein Dey
19	Abderraouf Agoune	(Algeria)	AM	3 June 2005 (age 21)	2026	
20	Hatem Dakhia	(Algeria)	AM	28 March 1991 (age 35)	2026	(Algeria) MSP Batna
21	Mohamed Tahar Rafai	(Algeria)	DM	4 September 2005 (age 21)	2026	
23	Abderrahmane Boughachiche	(Algeria)	AM	3 June 1998 (age 28)	2026	
24	Ilyes Toumi	(Algeria)	AM	26 February 2001 (age 25)	2026	(Algeria) ASM Oran
26	Mohamed Khellaf	(Algeria)	DM	12 November 2003 (age 22)	2026	
27	Firaz Saibi	(Algeria)	DM	22 March 2003 (age 23)	2026	(Algeria) CS Constantine
Forwards
9	Antonio Lasheb	(Algeria) (France)	FW	18 April 2003 (age 23)	2026	(Algeria) USM El Harrach
11	Mourad Bourada	(Algeria)	FW	4 April 1998 (age 28)	2026	(Algeria) JS Bordj Ménaïel
13	Karim Belhani	(Algeria)	FW	24 April 1999 (age 27)	2026	
18	Tariq Guettout	(Algeria)	FW	24 July 1994 (age 32)	2026	(Algeria) JS Djijel
25	Adel Belkacem-Bouzida	(Algeria)	FW	28 February 2002 (age 24)	2026	(Algeria) Paradou AC
28	Firas Aoun	(Algeria)	FW	29 April 2004 (age 22)	2026	
29	Mohamed Khalil Benflis	(Algeria)	FW	21 December 2004 (age 21)	2026	

== Honours ==
- Algerian Cup
  - Runners-up (2): 1997, 2010
- Algerian League Cup
  - Runners-up (1): 1998

== Performance in CAF competitions ==
- CAF Confederation Cup: 1 appearance

2011 – Preliminary Round

== Former players ==
For a complete list of former players, see: Category:CA Batna players

== Managers ==
- (Iraq) Ameur Djamil (1 July 2011 – 20 Feb 2012)
- (Algeria) Toufik Rouabah (29 Feb 2012 – 30 June 2012)
- (Algeria) Rachid Bouarrata (1 July 2012 – 10 Oct 2012)
- (Algeria) Toufik Rouabah (12 Oct 2012 – 1 Jan 2013)
- (Algeria) Ali Fergani (5 Jan 2013–)
