= 2012–13 MC Alger season =

MC Alger
2012–13 season
- Owner: Sonatrach
- President: Omar Ghrib
- Head coach: Patrick Liewig (until 18 August 2012); Jean-Paul Rabier (from 21 August 2012) (until 22 September 2012); Djamel Menad (from 24 September 2012)
- Stadium: Stade du 5 Juillet
- Ligue 1: 5th
- Algerian Cup: Runners-up
- Top goalscorer: League: Moustapha Djallit (14); All: Moustapha Djallit (18)
Home colours

In the 2012–13 season, MC Alger competed in the Ligue 1 for the 42nd season, as well as the Algerian Cup. It was their 10th consecutive season in the top flight of Algerian football. On October 4, 2012, a protocol of agreement was signed between Sonatrach and SSPA MCA to purchase 100 percent of the capital of the sports company with shares of MC Alger, The President and General Manager of the Petroleum Company as well as the Executive Financial Director of the company Omar Beja, attended on the Mouloudia side, Chairman of the Board of Directors Abdelkader Bouhraoua who signed the protocol. Regarding the debts recorded in the proceeds, the shareholders of the sports institution with shares pledged to MCA to give up their shares in favor of Sonatrach at the nominal value of the latter.

== Squad list ==
Players and squad numbers last updated on 18 November 2010.
Note: Flags indicate national team as has been defined under FIFA eligibility rules. Players may hold more than one non-FIFA nationality.

No.	Nat.	Position	Name	Date of Birth (Age)	Signed from
Goalkeepers
Defenders
Midfielders
Forwards

== Competitions ==
=== Overview ===
Competition	Record								Started round	Final position / round	First match	Last match
Competition	G	W	D	L	GF	GA	GD	Win %	Started round	Final position / round	First match	Last match
Ligue 1	30	15	8	7	33	24	+9	50.00	—N/a	5th	15 September 2012	21 May 2013
Algerian Cup	6	3	2	1	10	4	+6	50.00	Round of 64	Runners-up	15 December 2012	1 May 2013
Total	36	18	10	8	43	28	+15	50.00				

Updated to match played 9 May 2017
Source: Competitions

== League table ==
Pos	Team	Pld	W	D	L	GF	GA	GD	Pts	Qualification or relegation
3	CS Constantine	30	13	13	4	37	20	+17	52	Qualification for the Confederation Cup preliminary round
4	USM Alger (Note: USM Alger, the 2012–13 Algerian Cup winner, withdrew before the start of the competition.)	30	15	6	9	32	15	+17	51	Qualification for the Confederation Cup preliminary round
5	MC Alger (Note: In a match between USM El Harrach and MC Alger the last refused to play in the Stade 1er Novembre 1954, but the LFP refused to change the pitch, Despite the presence of USM El Harrach, the referees and supporters, but the Mouloudia team did not attend. the club will receive a penalty, according to Article 84 of the Disciplinary Code of the Algerian Football Federation (FAF), "a match lost by penalty. Defalcation of three (03) points, One million dinars (1,000,000 dinars) fine for the club. "The offending club will be deprived of its compensation due for television rights.)	30	15	8	7	33	24	+9	50	
6	CR Belouizdad	30	11	11	8	32	26	+6	44	
7	JS Kabylie	30	11	8	11	32	31	+1	41	

Updated to match(es) played on 21 May 2013. Source: DZFoot
Rules for classification: 1) points; 2) head-to-head points; 3) head-to-head goal difference; 4) goal difference; 5) total goals; 6) fairplay ranking; 7) playoff.

=== Results summary ===
Overall								Home						Away					
Pld	W	D	L	GF	GA	GD	Pts	W	D	L	GF	GA	GD	W	D	L	GF	GA	GD
30	15	8	7	33	21	+12	53	11	3	1	22	8	+14	4	5	6	11	13	−2

Last updated: 29 December 2014.
Source: Competitive matches

=== Results by round ===
Round	1	2	3	4	5	6	7	8	9	10	11	12	13	14	15	16	17	18	19	20	21	22	23	24	25	26	27	28	29	30
Ground	A	H	A	H	A	H	A	H	A	A	H	A	H	A	H	H	A	H	A	H	A	H	A	H	H	A	H	A	H	A
Result	W	W	L	D	D	W	D	W	D	W	D	L	D	W	W	L	L	W	W	W	L	W	D	W	W	D	W	L	W	L
Position	1	1	3	4	6	4	4	3	3	3	5	6	6	4	4	4	4	4	4	3	4	3	3	3	2	2	2	3	3	5

Source: Competitive matches
A = Away; H = Home; W = Win; D = Draw; L = Loss

=== Matches ===
15 September 2012 Round 1	WA Tlemcen	0–3	MC Alger	Tlemcen
16:00		Report	27', 37', 39' Djallit	Stadium: Stade Akid Lotfi; Referee: Djamel Haimoudi

18 September 2012 Round 2	MC Alger	1–0	JS Saoura	Algiers
17:45	Djallit 90+3'	Report		Stadium: Stade 5 Juillet 1962; Referee: Boubekeur Zouaoui

22 September 2012 Round 3	USM Alger	1–0	MC Alger	Algiers
17:45	Gasmi 67'	Report		Stadium: Stade 5 Juillet 1962; Referee: Mokhtar Amalou

29 September 2012 Round 4	MC Alger	0–0	ASO Chlef	Algiers
18:00		Report		Stadium: July 5, 1962 Stadium; Referee: Mehdi Abid Charef

5 October 2012 Round 5	JSM Béjaïa	1–1	MC Alger	Béjaïa
16:45	Boulemdaïs 69' (pen.)	Report	85' Djallit	Stadium: Stade de l'Unité Maghrébine; Referee: Djamel Haimoudi

16 October 2012 Round 6	MC Alger	3–1	USM Bel-Abbès	Algiers
18:00	Djallit 18'; Metref 31'; Yachir 53'	Report	82' Hamiche	Stadium: July 5, 1962 Stadium; Referee: Rafik Achouri

20 October 2012 Round 7	CR Belouizdad	0–0	MC Alger	Algiers
17:45		Report		Stadium: July 5, 1962 Stadium; Referee: Mohamed Ghorbal

23 October 2012 Round 8	MC Alger	1–0	CS Constantine	Algiers
18:00	Djallit 12' (pen.)	Report		Stadium: July 5, 1962 Stadium; Referee: Mohamed Benouza

3 November 2012 Round 9	MC Oran	2–2	MC Alger	Oran
18:00	Bourzama 24'; Sandaogo 90+4'	Report	50' Metref; 85' Yalaoui	Stadium: Ahmed Zabana Stadium; Referee: Farouk Mial

10 November 2012 Round 10	JS Kabylie	0–1	MC Alger	Tizi Ouzou
18:00		Report	6' Yaâlaoui	Stadium: Stade du 1er Novembre 1954; Referee: Mokhtar Amalou

17 November 2012 Round 11	MC Alger	0–0	MC El Eulma	Algiers
18:00		Report		Stadium: Stade Omar Hamadi; Referee: Djamel Haimoudi

24 November 2012 Round 12	ES Sétif	3–1	MC Alger	Sétif
18:00	Djahnit 14'; Aoudia 18'; Ziti 85'	Report	16' Ghazi	Stadium: Stade 8 Mai 1945; Referee: Sofiane Bousseter

1 December 2012 Round 13	MC Alger	1–1	CA Bordj Bou Arréridj	Algiers
15:00	Bachiri 30'	Report	41' Ammour	Stadium: July 5, 1962 Stadium; Referee: Khaled Saâdi

8 December 2012 Round 14	CA Batna	0–1	MC Alger	Batna
15:00		Report	35' (pen.) Djallit	Stadium: November 1, 1954 Stadium; Referee: Mohamed Benouza

21 December 2012 Round 15	MC Alger	1–0	USM El Harrach	Algiers
16:00	Djallit 52' (pen.)	Report		Stadium: July 5, 1962 Stadium; Referee: Mehdi Abid Charef

15 January 2013 Round 16	MC Alger	0–1	WA Tlemcen	Algiers
18:00		Report	13' Bousehaba	Stadium: July 5, 1962 Stadium; Referee: Boubekeur Zouaoui

19 January 2013 Round 17	JS Saoura	2–0	MC Alger	Béchar
15:00	Bouguelmouna 47'; Benmohamed 63'	Report		Stadium: Stade 20 Août 1955; Referee: Mohamed Saïdi

25 January 2013 Round 18	MC Alger	1–0	USM Alger	Algiers
17:45	Djallit 75'	Report		Stadium: July 5, 1962 Stadium; Referee: Merzak Halalchi

2 February 2013 Round 19	ASO Chlef	0–1	MC Alger	Chlef
15:00		Report	44' Bouguèche	Stadium: Stade Mohamed Boumezrag; Referee: Farouk Houasnia

9 February 2013 Round 20	MC Alger	3–1	JSM Béjaïa	Algiers
15:00	Djallit 39' (pen.); Yachir 63', 71'	Report	51' (pen.) Zerara	Stadium: Stade Omar Hamadi; Attendance: 0 (close doors); Referee: Redouane Necib

16 February 2013 Round 21	USM Bel-Abbès	2–1	MC Alger	Sidi Bel Abbès
15:00	Khali 54'; Hamiche 77' (pen.)	Report	30' Metref	Stadium: Stade 24 Fevrier 1956; Referee: Farouk Mial

22 February 2013 Round 22	MC Alger	2–1	CR Belouizdad	Algiers
17:45	Yachir 45+1', 55'	Report	86' Rebih	Stadium: July 5, 1962 Stadium; Referee: Djamel Haimoudi

9 March 2013 Round 23	CS Constantine	0–0	MC Alger	Constantine
15:00		Report		Stadium: Stade Mohamed Hamlaoui; Referee: Mohamed Benouza

19 March 2013 Round 24	MC Alger	2–0	MC Oran	Algiers
15:00	Djallit 18' (pen.); Attafen 88'	Report		Stadium: July 5, 1962 Stadium; Referee: Boubekeur Zouaoui

6 April 2013 Round 25	MC Alger	3–1	JS Kabylie	Algiers
18:00	Djallit 33' (pen.); Yachir 50', 81'	Report	59' (pen.) Rial	Stadium: Stade Omar Hamadi; Referee: Redouane Necib

20 April 2013 Round 26	MC El Eulma	0–0	MC Alger	El Eulma
16:00		Report		Stadium: Stade Messaoud Zougar; Referee: Mohamed Benouza

7 May 2013 Round 27	MC Alger	3–2	ES Sétif	Algiers
17:00	Djallit 1'; Aksas 37'; Bouguèche 80'	Report	31' Delhoum; 43' Mechac	Stadium: July 5, 1962 Stadium; Referee: Farouk Houasnia

11 May 2013 Round 28	CA Bordj Bou Arréridj	2–0	MC Alger	Bordj Bou Arréridj
17:00	Ali Guechi 59'; Saâdi 76'	Report		Stadium: Stade 20 Août 1955; Referee: Mohamed Bachir

18 May 2013 Round 29	MC Alger	1–0	CA Batna	Algiers
17:00	Bouguèche 60'	Report		Stadium: July 5, 1962 Stadium; Referee: Mohamed Saïdi

21 May 2013 Round 30	USM El Harrach	Match awarded (Note: The matches were not played because MC Alger refused to play in the Stade 1er Novembre 1954, but the LFP refused to change the pitch, Despite the presence of USM El Harrach, the referees and supporters, but the Mouloudia team did not attend. the club will receive a penalty, according to Article 84 of the Disciplinary Code of the Algerian Football Federation (FAF), "a match lost by penalty. Defalcation of three (03) points, One million dinars (1,000,000 dinars) fine for the club. "The offending club will be deprived of its compensation due for television rights.)	MC Alger	Algiers
17:00		Report		Stadium: Stade 1er Novembre 1954; Referee: Mehdi Abid Charef

== Algerian Cup ==
15 December 2012 Round of 64	US Chaouia	1–1 (2–4 p)	MC Alger	Oum El Bouaghi
14:00	Belaidi 33'		89' Djallit	Stadium: Stade Zerdani Hassouna; Referee: Boussâadia

28 December 2012 Round of 32	MC Alger	0–0 (a.e.t.) (7-6 p)	JS Kabylie	Algiers
16:00				Stadium: Stade 5 Juillet 1962; Referee: Mokhtar Amalou
	Penalties
	Moustapha Djallit (penalty scored); Mehdi Kacem (penalty scored); Mouaouia Meklouche (penalty scored); Nabil Yaâlaoui (penalty scored); Hocine Metref (penalty missed); Bilal Ouali (penalty scored); Faouzi Chaouchi (penalty scored); Hamza Zeddam (penalty scored)		(penalty scored) Abdelmalek Mokdad; (penalty scored) Belkacem Remache; (penalty scored) Mohamed Walid Bencherifa; (penalty missed) Madani Camara; (penalty scored) Ali Rial; (penalty scored) Zineddine Mekkaoui; (penalty scored) Malik Asselah; (penalty missed) Abdenour Hadiouche

1 March 2013 Round of 16	MC Alger	3–0	USM Aïn Beïda	Algiers
16:00	Yachir 6'; Bachiri 31'; Djallit 75' (pen.)			Stadium: July 5, 1962 Stadium; Referee: Mohammed Bachir

29 March 2013 Quarter-final	MC Alger	3–0	CS Constantine	Algiers
17:00	Bouguèche 42'; Ghazi 45'; Djallit 90+3' (pen.)			Stadium: July 5, 1962 Stadium; Referee: Djamel Haimoudi

12 April 2013 Semi-final	MC Alger	3–2	ES Sétif	Algiers
17:00	Bouguèche 7'; Djallit 21' (pen.); Besseghir 31'		15' Nadji; 76' Djahnit	Stadium: Stade 5 Juillet 1962; Referee: Mehdi Abid Charef

1 May 2013 Final	USM Alger	1–0	MC Alger	Algiers
16:00	Benmoussa 18'			Stadium: Stade 5 Juillet 1962; Referee: Djamel Haimoudi

== Squad information ==
=== Playing statistics ===
No.	Pos	Nat	Player	Total		Ligue 1		Algerian Cup	
No.	Pos	Nat	Player	Apps	Goals	Apps	Goals	Apps	Goals
1	GK	(Algeria) ALG	Fawzi Chaouchi	31	0	25	0	6	0
12	GK	(Algeria) ALG	Houari Djemili	5	0	5	0	0	0
27	DF	(Algeria) ALG	Abderahmane Hachoud	26	0	22	0	4	0
5	DF	(Algeria) ALG	Amine Aksas	12	1	9	1	3	0
11	DF	(Algeria) ALG	Abdelkader Besseghir	23	1	20	0	3	1
15	DF	(Algeria) ALG	Réda Babouche	26	0	21	0	5	0
25	DF	(Algeria) ALG	Hamza Zeddam	10	0	8	0	2	0
16	DF	(Algeria) ALG	Karim Ghazi	32	2	28	1	4	1
30	DF	(Algeria) ALG	Abdelmalek Djeghbala	31	0	27	0	4	0
13	DF	(Algeria) ALG	Redouane Bachiri	31	2	27	1	4	1
8	MF	(Algeria) ALG	Mehdi Kacem	26	0	20	0	6	0
18	MF	(Algeria) ALG	Farid Daoud	6	0	5	0	1	0
7	MF	(Algeria) ALG	Billel Attafen	23	1	17	1	6	0
23	MF	(Algeria) ALG	Hocine Metref	31	3	27	3	4	0
14	MF	(Algeria) ALG	Nabil Yaâlaoui	20	2	18	2	2	0
24	MF	(Algeria) ALG	Bilal Moumen	9	0	9	0	0	0
10	MF	(Algeria) ALG	Billal Ouali	23	0	19	0	4	0
21	FW	(Algeria) ALG	Ali Sami Yachir	29	8	23	7	6	1
99	FW	(Algeria) ALG	Hadj Bouguèche	16	5	12	3	4	2
17	FW	(Algeria) ALG	Moustapha Djallit	35	18	29	14	6	4
19	FW	(Algeria) ALG	Mouaouia Meklouche	12	0	11	0	1	0
31	FW	(Algeria) ALG	Zinedine Bensalem	5	0	5	0	0	0
22	FW	(Algeria) ALG	Réda Sayah	9	0	7	0	2	0
Players transferred out during the season
20	DF	(Cameroon) CMR	Claude Mobitang	2	0	2	0	0	0
	FW	(Algeria) ALG	Tahar Bouraba	1	0	1	0	0	0
9	FW	(Democratic Republic of the Congo) COD	Lelo Mbele	6	0	5	0	1	0

Last updated: 27 November 2017
Source: fr.soccerway.com

== Transfers ==
=== In ===
Date	Pos	Player	From club	Transfer fee	Source
1 July 2012	GK	(Algeria) Houari Djemili	WA Tlemcen	Undisclosed	
1 July 2012	DF	(Algeria) Redouane Bachiri	JSM Béjaïa	Undisclosed	
1 July 2012	MF	(Algeria) Hocine Metref	JS Kabylie	Undisclosed	
1 July 2012	MF	(Algeria) Billal Ouali	Paradou AC	Undisclosed	
1 July 2012	FW	(Algeria) Mouaouia Meklouche	USM Alger	Loan one year	
12 July 2012	MF	(Algeria) Mehdi Kacem	JSM Béjaïa	Undisclosed	
14 July 2012	DF	(Algeria) Abderahmane Hachoud	ES Setif	€150,000	
1 August 2012	FW	(Algeria) Tahar Bouraba	MC Saïda	Undisclosed	
13 August 2012	FW	(Democratic Republic of the Congo) Lelo Mbele	(Malaysia) Selangor FA	Undisclosed	
7 January 2013	FW	(Algeria) Hadj Bouguèche	(Saudi Arabia) Al-Taawoun	Undisclosed	
8 January 2013	MF	(Algeria) Lazhar Hadj Aïssa	(Kuwait) Qadsia SC	Undisclosed	
14 January 2013	DF	(Algeria) Amine Aksas	CR Belouizdad	Undisclosed	

=== Out ===
Date	Pos	Player	To club	Transfer fee	Source
26 May 2012	MF	(Algeria) Hamza Koudri	MC Alger	Free transfer	
21 June 2012	MF	(Algeria) Seddik Berradja	MC Oran	Undisclosed	
21 June 2012	DF	(Algeria) Mohamed Megherbi	MC Alger	Undisclosed	
1 July 2012	FW	(Algeria) Mohamed Amroune	ASO Chlef	Undisclosed	
2 January 2013	FW	(Algeria) Tahar Bouraba	CA Batna	Loan	
2 January 2013	FW	(Democratic Republic of the Congo) Lelo Mbele	CA Batna	Loan	
