= List of MC Alger players =

Below is a list of notable footballers who have played for MC Alger. Generally, this means players that have played 100 or more league matches for the club. However, some players who have played fewer matches are also included; this includes players that have had considerable success either at other clubs or at international level, as well as players who are well remembered by the supporters for particular reasons.

Players are listed in alphabetical order according to the date of their first-team official debut for the club. Appearances and goals are for first-team competitive matches only. Substitute appearances included. Statistics accurate as of 26 May 2019.

== List of MC Alger players ==
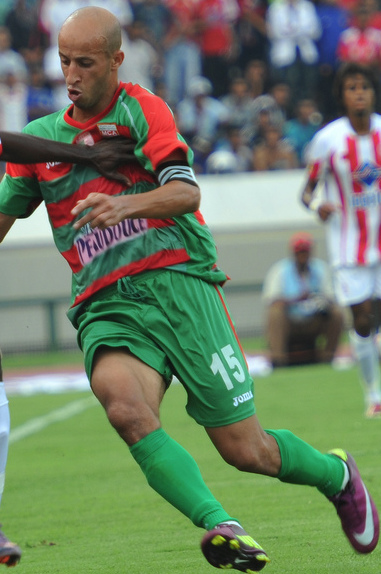
Réda Babouche.

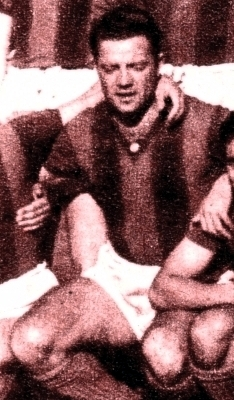
Roberto Aballay.

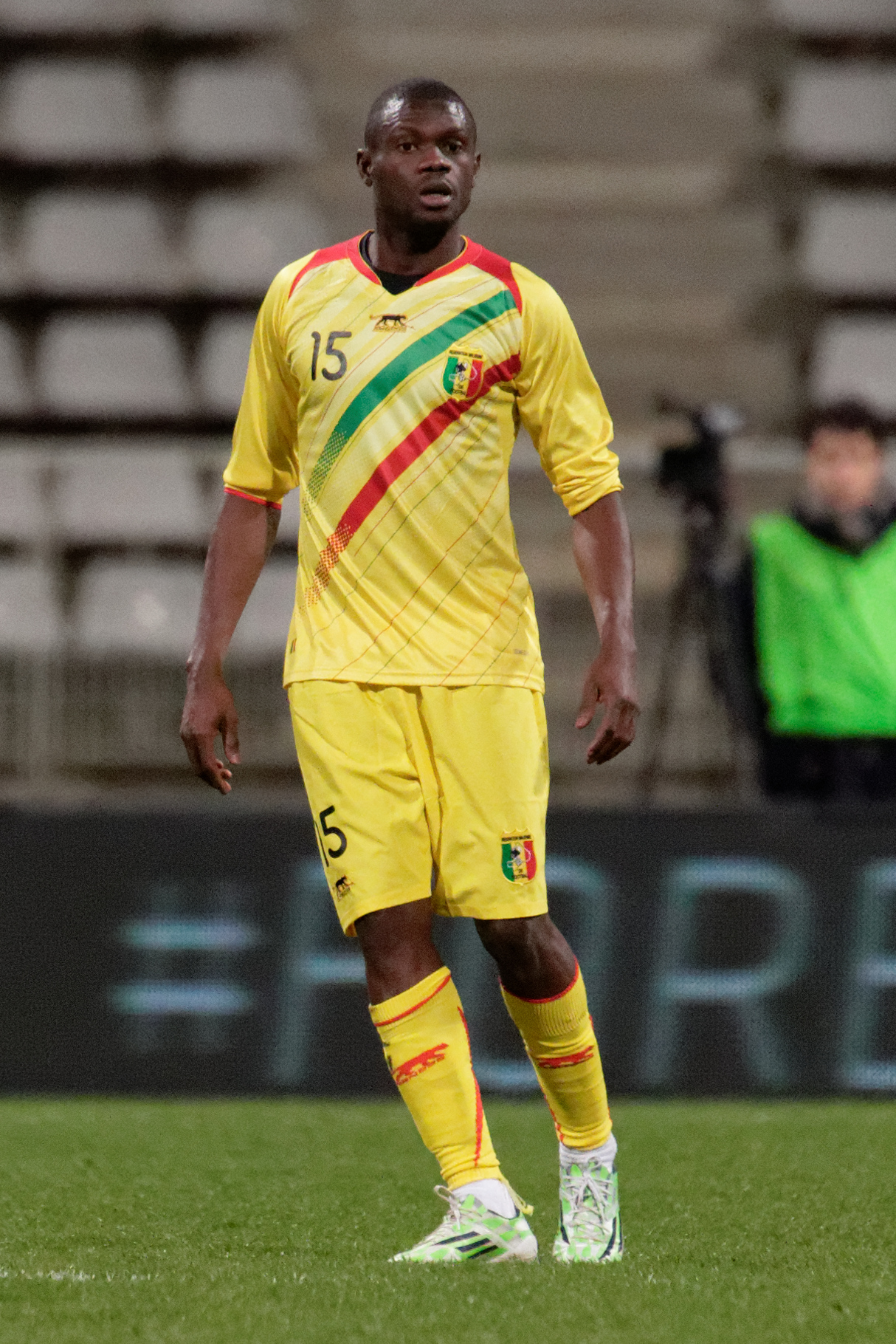
Drissa Diakité.

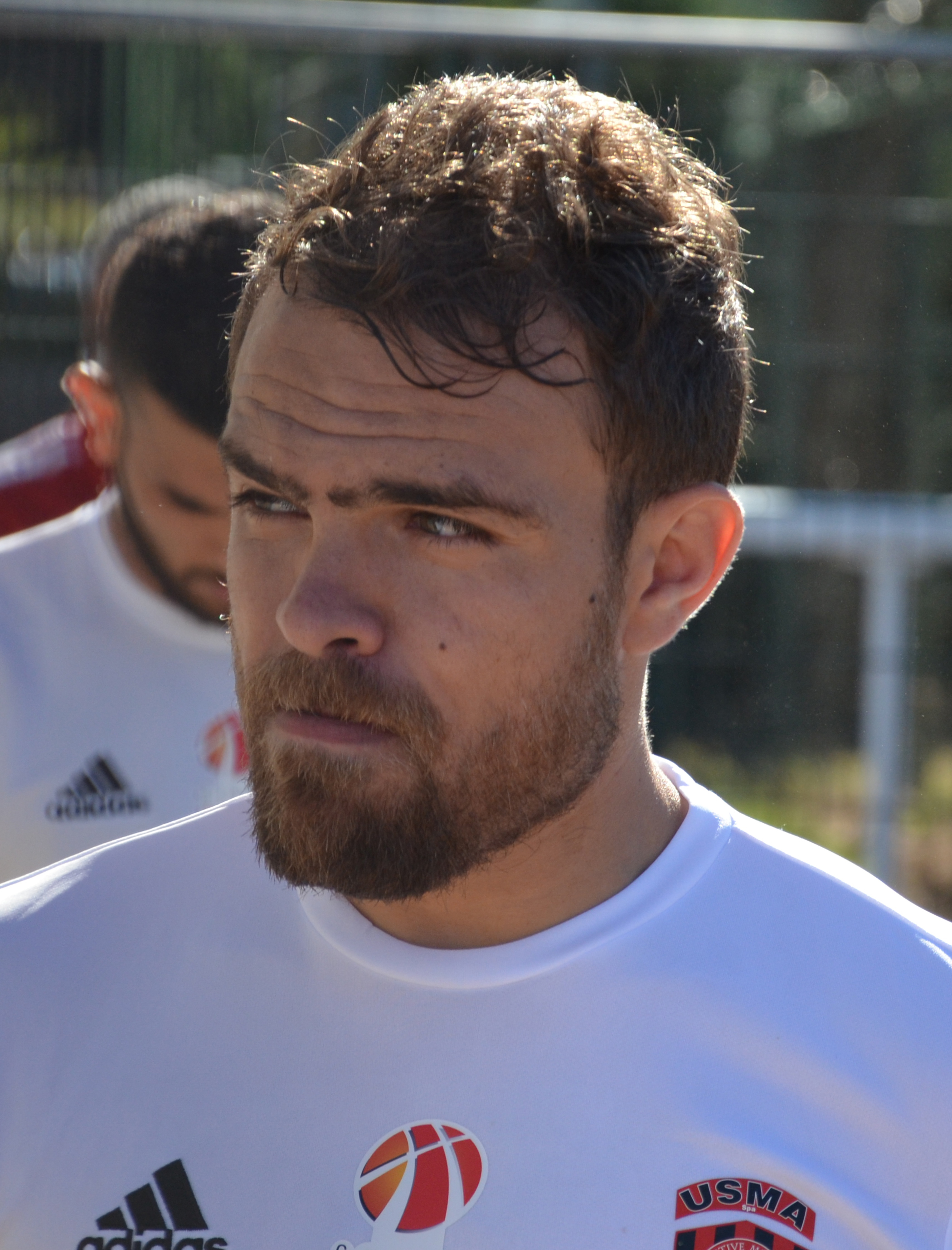
Hamza Koudri.

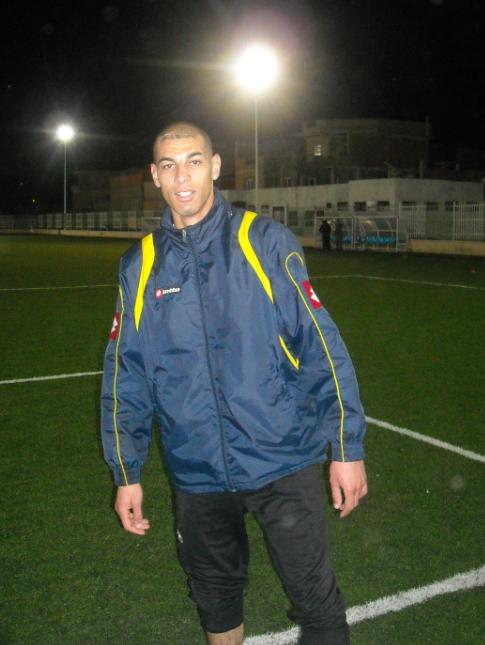
Faouzi Chaouchi.

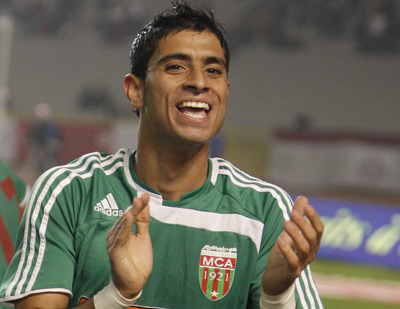
Mohamed Derrag.

Name	Nationality	Position	Inter career	Appearances	Goals	Notes
Amokrane Oualiken	(Algeria)	FW	1951–52, 1962–63	?	?	
Roberto Aballay	(Argentina)	FW	1955–56	22	3	
Anwar Bachta	(Algeria)	MF	1967–80	?	?	
Omar Betrouni	(Algeria)	FW	1967–80	363	94	
Abdenour Kaoua	(Algeria)	GK	1968–79	?	?	
Zoubir Bachi	(Algeria)	MF	1968–79	?	?	
Abdelouahab Zenir	(Algeria)	DF	1968–83	?	?	
Bouzid Mahiouz	(Algeria)	DF	1971–86	345	15	
Abdeslam Bousri	(Algeria)	FW	1971–80, 1981–84, 1985–87	370	164	
Aissa Draoui	(Algeria)	MF	1972–77	?	?	
Ali Bencheikh	(Algeria)	MF	1973–78, 1980–86, 1987–88	289	50	
Mohamed Ait Mouhoub	(Algeria)	GK	1973–86	?	?	
Nasser Bouiche	(Algeria)	FW	1977–87	250	67	
Lakhdar Belloumi	(Algeria)	MF	1979–81	26	11	
Rafik Saïfi	(Algeria)	FW	1996–99	50	20	
Drissa Diakité	(Mali)	DF	2004–06	24	0	
Moussa Coulibaly	(Mali)	DF	2004–10	119	7	
Aliou Dieng	(Mali)	MF	2018–19	51	1	
Amar Ammour	(Algeria)	MF	2010–11	9	0	
Brahim Boudebouda	(Algeria)	DF	2008–11, 2016–18	116	10	
Nassim Bouchema	(Algeria)	MF	2007–11	68	4	
Abdelmalek Mokdad	(Algeria)	MF	2009–11, 2015–17	81	12	
Mohamed Derrag	(Algeria)	FW	2009–11	43	9	
Youssef Sofiane	(France)	FW	2010–11	14	2	
Nacer Ait Mouhoub	(Algeria)	GK	19??–??	?	?	
Abdenour Zemmour	(Algeria)	DF	19??–??	?	?	
Mohamed Azzouz	(Algeria)	DF	19??–??	?	?	
Abedelaziz Djemâa	(Algeria)	DF	19??–??	?	?	
Sadek Amrous	(Algeria)	DF	19??–??	?	?	
Abdelkader Ait Hamouda	(Algeria)	FW	19??–??	?	?	
Abdenour Bellemou	(Algeria)	FW	19??–??	?	?	
Youcef Farhi	(Algeria)	DF	19??–??	?	?	
Nasreddine Laroussi	(Algeria)	DF	19??–??	?	?	
Abdelmajid Oudina	(Algeria)	DF	19??–??	?	?	
Mohamed Ghrib	(Algeria)	MF	19??–??	?	?	
Nasreddine Lâaouada	(Algeria)	MF	19??–??	?	?	
Saïd Meghichi	(Algeria)	MF	19??–??	?	?	
Omar Hahad	(Algeria)	FW	19??–??	?	?	
Ali Azzouz	(Algeria)	FW	19??–??	?	?	
Aziouez Azzef	(Algeria)	FW	19??–??	?	?	
Ahmed Laâgoun	(Algeria)	FW	19??–??	?	?	
Abdeldjalil Dahmoun	(Algeria)	FW	19??–??	?	?	
Nouredine Mazari	(Algeria)	MF	19??–??	?	?	
Hamid Benhamou	(Algeria)	MF	19??–??	?	?	
Houari Djemili	(Algeria)	GK	2012–15	45	0	
Habib Bellaïd	(Algeria)	DF	2013–14	18	0	
Edwin Lavatsa	(Kenya)	MF	2014	6	0	
Stéphane Paul Dibi	(Ivory Coast)	FW	2014	5	0	
Amine Aksas	(Algeria)	DF	2013–15	39	4	
Koceila Berchiche	(Algeria)	DF	2014–15	34	2	
Sabri Gharbi	(Algeria)	MF	2013–15	45	1	
Christopher Mendouga	(Cameroon)	FW	2014–15	14	1	
Samson Mbingui	(Gabon)	MF	2014–15	11	0	
Ibrahim Khalil Sylla	(Guinea)	MF	2014–15	16	3	
Antar Boucherit	(Algeria)	MF	2014, 2016	32	2	
Kheiredine Merzougi	(Algeria)	FW	2015–16	17	7	
Lamine Abid	(Algeria)	FW	2015–16	22	4	
Redouane Bachiri	(Algeria)	DF	2012–16	88	3	
Toufik Zeghdane	(Algeria)	DF	2013–16	84	3	
Sofiane Ben Braham	(Algeria)	DF	2014–16	44	1	
Karim Hendou	(Algeria) (Ukraine)	MF	2014–16	30	0	
Khaled Gourmi	(Algeria)	MF	2014–17	80	16	
Mehdi Kacem	(Algeria)	MF	2012–14, 2015–17	112	4	
Amir Karaoui	(Algeria)	MF	2014–18	129	6	
Zakaria Mansouri	(Algeria)	MF	2016–18	30	3	
Zahir Zerdab	(Algeria)	MF	2016–17	27	6	
Sid Ahmed Aouedj	(Algeria)	MF	2014–17	96	11	
Oussama Chita	(Algeria)	MF	2013–17	46	1	
Fawzi Chaouchi	(Algeria)	GK	2011–18	159	1	
Sofiane Azzedine	(Algeria)	GK	2004–08, 2011–13	17	0	
Abdelkader Besseghir	(Algeria)	DF	2008–14	125	1	
Réda Babouche	(Algeria)	DF	2004–13	188	16	
Hamza Zeddam	(Algeria)	DF	2008–13	88	3	
Karim Ghazi	(Algeria)	MF	2011–14	72	2	
Claude Mobitang	(Cameroon)	DF	2011–13	23	0	
Abdelmalek Djeghbala	(Algeria)	DF	2011–14	60	0	
Mohamed Megherbi	(Algeria)	DF	2010–12	36	2	
Seddik Berradja	(Algeria)	MF	2011–12	10	0	
Hamza Koudri	(Algeria)	MF	2006–12	152	7	
Farid Daoud	(Algeria)	MF	2007–14	80	0	
Billel Attafen	(Algeria)	MF	2009–13	101	6	
Tayeb Berramla	(Algeria)	MF	2011–12	17	0	
Amir Sayoud	(Algeria)	MF	2012	5	1	
Nabil Yaâlaoui	(Algeria)	MF	2011–14	51	5	
El Almi Daoudi	(Algeria)	MF	2010–12	40	2	
Bilal Moumen	(Algeria)	MF	2008–14	0	0	
Sofiane Younes	(Algeria)	MF	2005–09, 2012	94	16	
Abdelhakim Laref	(Algeria)	MF	2011–12	30	7	
Hervé Oussalé	(Burkina Faso)	FW	2011–12	9	1	
Ali Sami Yachir	(Algeria)	FW	2012–15	74	9	
Mohamed Amroune	(Algeria)	FW	2008–12	69	12	
Moustapha Djallit	(Algeria)	FW	2012–15	96	36	
Zinedine Bensalem	(Algeria)	FW	2009–14	42	1	
Réda Sayah	(Algeria)	FW	2011–14	47	9	
Sofiane Harkat	(Algeria)	DF	2010–11	25	0	
Hichem Chérif El-Ouazzani	(Algeria)	MF	2015–19	86	2	
Islam Arous	(Algeria)	DF	2018–19	25	0	
Saladin Said	(Ethiopia)	FW	2015–16	6	0	
Zakaria Haddouche	(Algeria)	FW	2018–19	28	1	
Oussama Tebbi	(Algeria)	MF	2018–19	21	0	
Rachid Bouhenna	(Algeria)	DF	2015–18	80	2	
Mansour Benothmane	(Algeria)	FW	2018–19	10	0	
Mohamed Souibaâh	(Algeria)	FW	2017–19	32	8	
Aliou Dieng	(Mali)	MF	2017–19	54	1	
Ryad Kenniche	(Algeria)	DF	2019	4	0	
Abdelghani Demmou	(Algeria)	DF	2015–19	88	0	
Farès Hachi	(Algeria)	DF	2018–19	15	1	
Ibrahim Amada	(Madagascar)	MF	2017–19	55	6	
Ayoub Azzi	(Algeria)	DF	2014–20	135	6	
Sofiane Bendebka	(Algeria)	MF	2017–20	88	16	
Farid Chaâl	(Algeria)	GK	2014–	96	0	
Hichem Nekkache	(Algeria)	FW	2016–	120	31	
Walid Derrardja	(Algeria)	FW	2015–	148	32	
Abderahmane Hachoud	(Algeria)	DF	2012–	254	46	
Zidane Mebarakou	(Algeria)	DF	2016–18, 2019–	92	4	
Athmane Toual	(Algeria)	GK	2019–	8	0	
Nabil Lamara	(Algeria)	DF	2018–	27	1	
Miloud Rebiai	(Algeria)	DF	2019–	16	0	
Belkacem Brahimi	(Algeria)	DF	2019–	18	1	
Walid Alati	(Algeria)	DF	2019–	10	1	
Mohamed Merouani	(Algeria)	DF	2018–	27	0	
Chamseddine Harrag	(Algeria)	MF	2019–	18	0	
Abderrahmane Bourdim	(Algeria)	MF	2018–	43	6	
Mehdi Benaldjia	(Algeria)	MF	2018–	39	2	
Abdelmoumene Djabou	(Algeria)	MF	2019–	18	0	
Mehdi Ouertani	(Tunisia)	MF	2019–	11	0	
Abdellah El Moudene	(Algeria)	MF	2017–18, 2019–	20	0	
Samy Frioui	(Algeria)	FW	2018–	37	16	
Abdenour Belkheir	(Algeria)	FW	2019–	13	0	
Farouk Chafaï	(Algeria)	DF	2019–	12	1	
Rooney Eva Wankewai	(Cameroon)	FW	2019–	6	0	

Nationalities are indicated by the corresponding FIFA country code.

== List of all-time appearances ==
This list of all-time appearances for MC Alger contains football players who have played for MC Alger and have managed to accrue 100 or more appearances.

Bold Still playing competitive football in MC Alger. (Note: Statistics correct as of game against NC Magra on March 14, 2020)

#	Name	Position	League	Cup	Others^{1}	Africa^{2}	Arab^{3}	TOTAL
1	(Algeria) Abdeslam Bousri	FW	301	40	0	24	5	370
2	(Algeria) Omar Betrouni	FW	294	41	0	0	0	363
3	(Algeria) Bouzid Mahiouz	DF	0	0	0	0	0	345
4	(Algeria) Ali Bencheikh	MF	224	29	0	14	5	271
5	(Algeria) Abderahmane Hachoud	RB	192	30	2	24	11	259
6	(Algeria) Nasser Bouiche	FW	0	0	0	0	0	250
7	(Algeria) Réda Babouche	LB / RB	209	19	2	13	0	243
8	(Algeria) Fawzi Chaouchi	GK	126	22	1	19	0	168
9	(Algeria) Abdelkader Besseghir	RB	136	15	0	11	0	162
10	(Algeria) Walid Derrardja	FW	106	14	0	21	7	148
11	(Algeria) Hamza Zeddam	CB	116	9	0	11	0	136
12	(Algeria) Ayoub Azzi	CB / RB	97	12	2	15	9	135
13	(Algeria) Hichem Nekkache	FW	87	6	0	20	7	120
14	(Algeria) Aïssa Draoui	MF	87	17	0	14	0	118
15	(Algeria) Brahim Boudebouda	LB / CB	94	8	1	13	0	116
16	(Algeria) Mehdi Kacem	DM	83	18	0	11	0	112
17	(Algeria) Sofiane Younès	LW / CF / LM	93	9	0	4	0	106
17	(Algeria) Moustapha Djallit	ST	87	13	1	2	0	104

^{1} ^{Includes the Playoffs, Super Cup and League Cup.} ^{2} ^{Includes the Cup Winners' Cup, CAF Cup, Confederation Cup and Champions League.} ^{3} ^{Includes the Champions League and UAFA Club Cup.}

== Players from MC Alger to Europe ==
Player	Pos	Club	League	Transfer fee	Source
(Algeria) Rafik Saïfi	FW	Troyes	(France) Ligue 1	Undisclosed	
(Mali) Drissa Diakité	DF	Nice	(France) Ligue 1	Undisclosed	
(Algeria) Ismaël Bouzid	DF	Kaiserslautern	(Germany) 2. Bundesliga	Undisclosed	
(Algeria) Noureddine Daham	FW	Kaiserslautern	(Germany) 2. Bundesliga	Undisclosed	
(Algeria) Rachid Bouhenna	DF	Dundee United	(Scotland) Scottish Championship	Free transfer	

== Award winners ==
(Whilst playing for MC Alger)

Top goalscorers in Algerian Ligue 1

- (Algeria) Hassan Tahir (20 goals) – 1971–72
- (Algeria) Abdeslam Bousri (12 goals) – 1972–73
- (Algeria) Omar Betrouni (17 goals) – 1973–74
- (Algeria) Abdeslam Bousri (14 goals) – 1977–78
- (Algeria) Abdeslam Bousri (11 goals) – 1978–79
- (Algeria) Nasser Bouiche (19 goals) – 1979–80
- (Algeria) Abdeslam Bousri (16 goals) – 1981–82
- (Algeria) Abdeslam Bousri (17 goals) – 1982–83
- (Algeria) Hadj Bouguèche (17 goals) – 2009–10
- (Algeria) Moustapha Djallit (14 goals) – 2012–13

Algerian professional football awards Footballer of the Year

- (Algeria) Abderahmane Hachoud – 2013–14

Algerian professional football awards Young Player of the Year

- (Algeria) Hamza Koudri – 2007–08
- (Algeria) Brahim Boudebouda – 2010–11
- (Algeria) Toufik Zeghdane – 2013–14

Algerian professional football awards Goalkeeper of the Year

- (Algeria) Lamine Zemmamouche – 2010–11
- (Algeria) Faouzi Chaouchi – 2015–16
