= 2011–12 MC Alger season =

MC Alger
2011–12 season
- Chairman: Omar Ghrib
- Head coach: Abdelhak Benchikha (from 1 September 2012) (until 5 October 2012); François Bracci (from 23 October 2012) (until 9 February 2012); Kamel Bouhellal (from 10 February 2012) (until 3 May 2012); Abdelkrim Bira (from 4 May 2012) (until 30 June 2012)
- Stadium: Omar Hamadi Stadium
- Ligue 1: 6th
- Algerian Cup: Round of 16
- Champions League: Group stage
- Top goalscorer: League: Moustapha Djallit (9); All: Moustapha Djallit (9)
Home colours

In the 2011–12 season, MC Alger competed in the Ligue 1 for the 41st season, as well as the Champions League, and the Algerian Cup. It was their 9th consecutive season in the top flight of Algerian football.

== Squad list ==
Players and squad numbers last updated on 18 November 2010.
Note: Flags indicate national team as has been defined under FIFA eligibility rules. Players may hold more than one non-FIFA nationality.

No.	Nat.	Position	Name	Date of birth (age)	Signed from
Goalkeepers
Defenders
Midfielders
Forwards

== Competitions ==
=== Overview ===
Competition	Record								Started round	Final position / round	First match	Last match
Competition	G	W	D	L	GF	GA	GD	Win %	Started round	Final position / round	First match	Last match
Ligue 1	30	11	11	8	35	33	+2	36.67	—N/a	13th	6 September 2011	21 May 2012
Algerian Cup	3	1	1	1	3	3	+0	33.33	Round of 64	Round of 16	30 December 2011	10 March 2012
Champions League	6	1	2	3	4	12	−8	16.67	Group stage		16 July 2011	16 September 2011
Total	39	13	14	12	42	48	−6	33.33				

Updated to match played 9 May 2017
Source: Competitions

== League table ==
Pos	Team	Pld	W	D	L	GF	GA	GD	Pts
4	CR Belouizdad	30	13	9	8	34	28	+6	48
5	ASO Chlef	30	14	5	11	41	34	+7	47
6	MC Alger	30	11	11	8	35	33	+2	44
7	CA Batna	30	12	8	10	38	25	+13	44
8	WA Tlemcen	30	12	8	10	39	37	+2	44

Updated to match(es) played on 19 April 2018. Source: DZFoot
Rules for classification: 1) points; 2) head-to-head points; 3) head-to-head goal difference; 4) goal difference; 5) total goals; 6) fairplay ranking; 7) playoff.

=== Results summary ===
Overall								Home						Away					
Pld	W	D	L	GF	GA	GD	Pts	W	D	L	GF	GA	GD	W	D	L	GF	GA	GD
30	11	11	8	35	33	+2	44	8	7	0	22	10	+12	3	4	8	13	23	−10

Last updated: 29 December 2014.
Source: Competitive matches

=== Results by round ===
Round	1	2	3	4	5	6	7	8	9	10	11	12	13	14	15	16	17	18	19	20	21	22	23	24	25	26	27	28	29	30
Ground	A	H	A	H	A	H	A	A	H	A	H	A	H	A	H	H	A	H	A	H	A	H	H	A	H	A	H	A	H	A
Result	L	W	L	D	L	D	D	L	W	L	W	L	W	D	W	D	W	D	D	D	L	W	W	W	W	L	D	W	D	D
Position	13	7	10	12	14	14	13	14	13	14	12	14	12	12	11	10	9	9	9	11	11	10	8	7	6	7	7	6	6	6

Source: Competitive matches
A = Away; H = Home; W = Win; D = Draw; L = Loss

=== Matches ===
6 September 2011 Round 1	JS Kabylie	1–0	MC Alger	Tizi Ouzou
19:00	Boulemdaïs 90+1'	Report		Stadium: Stade du 1er Novembre 1954; Referee: Mohamed Bichari

20 September 2011 Round 2	MC Alger	1–0	ES Sétif	Algiers
20:00	Yaâlaoui 16'	Report		Stadium: Stade 5 Juillet 1962; Referee: Sofiane Bousseter

24 September 2011 Round 3	CS Constantine	1–0	MC Alger	Constantine
18:00	Benhadj Djillali 70'	Report		Stadium: Stade Mohamed Hamlaoui; Referee: Mohamed Benouza

1 October 2011 Round 4	MC Alger	1–1	NA Hussein Dey	Algiers
18:00	Sayah 77'	Report	Souakir 90+5'	Stadium: Stade 5 Juillet 1962; Referee: Farouk Houasnia

15 October 2011 Round 5	JSM Béjaïa	1–0	MC Alger	Béjaïa
18:00	Boulaïnceur 50'	Report		Stadium: Stade de l'Unité Maghrébine; Referee: Rafik Achouri

21 October 2011 Round 6	MC Alger	0–0	ASO Chlef	Algiers
18:00		Report		Stadium: Stade Omar Hammadi; Referee: Mehdi Abid Charef

29 October 2011 Round 7	MC Saïda	0–0	MC Alger	Saida
18:00		Report		Stadium: April 13, 1958 Stadium; Referee: Boubekeur Zouaoui

4 November 2011 Round 8	CA Batna	3–0	MC Alger	Batna
15:00	Benamara 53', 76'; Bouchouk 72'	Report		Stadium: Mustapha Seffouhi Stadium; Referee: Bouaza Chenane

19 November 2011 Round 9	MC Alger	2–1	USM El Harrach	Algiers
18:00	Sayah 3'; Babouche 21'	Report	Ziane Cherif 26'	Stadium: Stade 5 Juillet 1962; Referee: Mokhtar Amalou

22 November 2011 Round 10	AS Khroub	2–1	MC Alger	El Khroub
15:00	Bakha 8' (pen.); Chaïb 18'	Report	Daoudi 30'	Stadium: Abed Hamdani Stadium; Referee: Mohamed Benouza

26 November 2011 Round 11	MC Alger	1–0	USM Alger	Algiers
18:00	Zeddam 72'	Report		Stadium: Stade 5 Juillet 1962; Referee: Farouk Mial

3 December 2011 Round 12	CR Belouizdad	2–0	MC Alger	Belouizdad
18:00	Ammour 48'; Kherbache 87'	Report		Stadium: Stade 20 Août 1955; Referee: Redouane Necib

10 December 2011 Round 13	MC Alger	3–1	WA Tlemcen	Algiers
18:00	Sayah 8'; Besseghir 71'; Yaâlaoui 82'	Report	Sameur 44'	Stadium: Stade 5 Juillet 1962; Referee: Habibatni

17 December 2011 Round 14	MC Oran	0–0	MC Alger	Oran
15:00		Report		Stadium: Ahmed Zabana Stadium; Referee: Mehdi Abid Charef

24 December 2011 Round 15	MC Alger	2–0	MC El Eulma	Algiers
18:00	Sayah 15'; Chaouchi 42' (pen.)	Report		Stadium: Stade 5 Juillet 1962; Referee: Farouk Houasnia

21 January 2012 Round 16	MC Alger	0–0	JS Kabylie	Algiers
17:45		Report		Stadium: Stade 5 Juillet 1962; Referee: Sofiane Bousseter

27 January 2012 Round 17	ES Sétif	0–1	MC Alger	Sétif
17:45		Report	Attafen 90'	Stadium: Stade 8 Mai 1945; Referee: Mehdi Abid Charef

31 January 2012 Round 18	MC Alger	2–2	CS Constantine	Algiers
17:45	Sayah 16', 70'	Report	Eguakun 76'; Lemaici 90+6'	Stadium: Stade 5 Juillet 1962; Referee: Mohamed Sahraoui

28 February 2012 Round 19	NA Hussein Dey	2–2	MC Alger	Algiers
17:45	Derrardja 14'; Allag 23'	Report	Babouche 19'; Sayah 66' (pen.)	Stadium: Stade 5 Juillet 1962; Referee: Mohamed Benouza

11 February 2012 Round 20	MC Alger	1–1	JSM Béjaïa	Algiers
17:45	Sayah 76'	Report	Yélémou 38'	Stadium: Stade Omar Hammadi; Referee: Farouk Houasnia

6 March 2012 Round 21	ASO Chlef	4–2	MC Alger	Chlef
17:45	Oussalé 26'; Messaoud 27', 68'; Seguer 74'	Report	Djallit 45+2', 79'	Stadium: Stade Mohamed Boumezrag; Referee: Redouane Necib

17 March 2012 Round 22	MC Alger	2–0	MC Saïda	Algiers
17:45	Djallit 43', 46'	Report		Stadium: Stade Omar Hammadi; Referee: Farouk Mial

24 March 2012 Round 23	MC Alger	2–1	CA Batna	Algiers
17:45	Djallit 17'; Zeddam 83'	Report	Saïdi 66'	Stadium: Stade 5 Juillet 1962; Referee: Mohamed Saïdi

7 April 2012 Round 24	USM El Harrach	0–1	MC Alger	Algiers
17:45		Report	Demmou 34' (o.g.)	Stadium: Stade 1er Novembre 1954; Referee: Mohamed Bichari

14 April 2012 Round 25	MC Alger	3–1	AS Khroub	Algiers
17:45	Hadji 14'; Ghazi 32'; Sayah 57'	Report	Bounab 49'	Stadium: Stade 5 Juillet 1962; Referee: Youssef Zerrouki

2 May 2012 Round 26	USM Alger	3–1	MC Alger	Algiers
17:45	Feham 25'; Djediat 46', 81' (pen.)	Report	90+2' Yalaoui	Stadium: Stade 5 Juillet 1962; Referee: Mehdi Abid Charef

5 May 2012 Round 27	MC Alger	1–1	CR Belouizdad	Algiers
16:00	Djallit 15'	Report	Slimani 10'	Stadium: Stade 5 Juillet 1962; Referee: Farouk Houasnia

8 May 2012 Round 28	WA Tlemcen	2–3	MC Alger	Tlemcen
16:00	Belarbi 9'; Sameur 14'	Report	Koudri 61'; Djallit 77', 90+1'	Stadium: Stade Akid Lotfi; Referee: Rafik Achouri

15 May 2012 Round 29	MC Alger	1–1	MC Oran	Algiers
18:00	Amroune 48'	Report	Bousehaba 38' (pen.)	Stadium: Stade 5 Juillet 1962; Referee: Redouane Necib

19 May 2012 Round 30	MC El Eulma	2–2	MC Alger	El Eulma
18:00	Diarra 42'; Tiaïba 54'	Report	Djallit 53'; Sayoud 87'	Stadium: Stade Messaoud Zougar; Referee: Mohamed Sahraoui

== Algerian Cup ==
30 December 2011 Round of 64	MO Béjaïa	1–1 (a.e.t.) (3–4 p)	MC Alger	Béjaïa
14:30	Henider 9'		Besseghir 64'	Stadium: Stade de l'Unité Maghrébine; Referee: Mohamed Benouza

24 February 2012 Round of 32	MC Alger	2–1	USM Aïn Beïda	Bologhine
17:00	Sayah 52'; Besseghir 66'		Guerra 90'	Stadium: Omar Hamadi Stadium; Referee: Khaled Saïdi

10 March 2012 Round of 16	WA Tlemcen	1–0	MC Alger	Tlemcen
16:00	Sidhoum 47'			Stadium: Stade Akid Lotfi; Referee: Mehdi Abid Charef

== Champions League ==
=== Group B ===
Pos	Team	Pld	W	D	L	GF	GA	GD	Pts	Qualification
1	(Tunisia) Espérance ST	6	2	4	0	9	4	+5	10	Advance to knockout stage
2	(Morocco) Wydad AC	6	1	4	1	11	9	+2	7 (Note: Wydad AC and Al-Ahly are ranked by their head-to-head records (decided by away goals).)	Advance to knockout stage
3	(Egypt) Al-Ahly	6	1	4	1	7	6	+1	7	
4	(Algeria) MC Alger	6	1	2	3	4	12	−8	5	

Source: CAF

==== Matches ====
16 July 2011 1	MC Alger (Algeria)	1–1	(Tunisia) Espérance ST	Algiers
18:30 UTC+01:00	Mohamed Megherbi 17'	Report	Oussama Darragi 7'	Stadium: Stade 5 Juillet 1962; Referee: Daniel Bennett (South Africa)

30 July 2011 2	Wydad Casablanca (Morocco)	4–0	(Algeria) MC Alger	Casablanca
19:00 UTC+01:00	Fabrice N'Guessi 1'; Ahmed Ajeddou 30' (pen.); Ayoub El Khaliki 74'; Jean Louis Pascal Angan 90'	Report		Stadium: Stade Mohamed V Referee: Khalid Abdul Rahman (Sudan)

12 August 2011 3	Al-Ahly (Egypt)	2–0	(Algeria) MC Alger	Cairo
22:00 UTC+02:00	Emad Moteab 10', 31'	Report		Stadium: Cairo International Stadium; Referee: Rajindraparsad Seechurn (Mauritius)

28 August 2011 4	MC Alger (Algeria)	0–0	(Egypt) Al-Ahly	Algiers
22:00 UTC+01:00		Report		Stadium: Stade 5 Juillet 1962; Referee: Koman Coulibaly (Mali)

10 September 2011 5	Espérance ST (Tunisia)	4–0	(Algeria) MC Alger	Tunis
19:10 UTC+01:00	Mejdi Traoui 8'; Yannick N'Djeng 21', 43', 55'	Report		Stadium: Stade El Menzah; Referee: Solomon Wokoma (Nigeria)

16 September 2011 6	MC Alger (Algeria)	3–1	(Morocco) Wydad Casablanca	Algiers
19:00 UTC+01:00	Réda Babouche 32', 36'; Hervé Oussalé 61'	Report	Ahmed Ajeddou 79' (pen.)	Stadium: Stade 5 Juillet 1962; Referee: Badara Diatta (Senegal)

== Squad information ==
=== Playing statistics ===
No.	Pos	Nat	Player	Total		Ligue 1		Algerian Cup		Champions League	
No.	Pos	Nat	Player	Apps	Goals	Apps	Goals	Apps	Goals	Apps	Goals
1	GK	(Algeria) ALG	Fawzi Chaouchi	20	1	18	1	2	0	0	0
28	GK	(Algeria) ALG	Sofiane Azzedine	17	0	11	0	0	0	6	0
35	GK	(Algeria) ALG	Farid Bouzidi	4	0	3	0	1	0	0	0
5	DF	(Algeria) ALG	Walid Cherfa	5	0	4	0	1	0	0	0
11	DF	(Algeria) ALG	Abdelkader Besseghier	35	3	27	1	3	2	5	0
15	DF	(Algeria) ALG	Réda Babouche	31	4	24	2	2	0	5	2
25	DF	(Algeria) ALG	Hamza Zeddam	31	2	23	2	3	0	5	0
16	DF	(Algeria) ALG	Karim Ghazi	27	1	24	1	3	0	0	0
20	DF	(Cameroon) CMR	Claude Mobitang	27	0	21	0	2	0	4	0
30	DF	(Algeria) ALG	Abdelmalek Djeghbala	19	0	17	0	2	0	0	0
12	DF	(Algeria) ALG	Mohamed Megherbi	17	1	13	0	0	0	4	1
22	DF	(Algeria) ALG	Ahmed Amine Belaïd	5	0	3	0	0	0	2	0
16	MF	(Algeria) ALG	Seddik Berradja	16	0	10	0	3	0	3	0
23	MF	(Algeria) ALG	Hamza Koudri	31	1	22	1	3	0	6	0
18	MF	(Algeria) ALG	Farid Daoud	25	0	18	0	2	0	5	0
7	MF	(Algeria) ALG	Billel Attafen	23	1	17	1	0	0	6	0
8	MF	(Algeria) ALG	Tayeb Berramla	8	0	3	0	0	0	5	0
27	MF	(Algeria) ALG	Amir Sayoud	5	1	5	1	0	0	0	0
14	MF	(Algeria) ALG	Nabil Yaâlaoui	28	3	25	3	3	0	0	0
8	MF	(Algeria) ALG	Abou El Kacem Hadji	13	1	12	1	1	0	0	0
19	MF	(Algeria) ALG	El Almi Daoudi	21	1	14	1	1	0	6	0
24	MF	(Algeria) ALG	Bilal Moumen	8	0	7	0	0	0	1	0
29	MF	(Algeria) ALG	Sofiane Younes	4	0	3	0	1	0	0	0
21	MF	(Algeria) ALG	Abdelhakim Laref	8	0	7	0	1	0	0	0
6	MF	(Algeria) ALG	Yanis Youssef	5	0	4	0	1	0	0	0
3	FW	(Burkina Faso) BFA	Hervé Oussalé	14	1	9	0	0	0	5	1
21	FW	(Algeria) ALG	Ali Sami Yachir	12	0	11	0	1	0	0	0
9	FW	(Algeria) ALG	Mohamed Amroune	19	1	12	1	3	0	4	0
17	FW	(Algeria) ALG	Moustapha Djallit	15	9	14	9	1	0	0	0
31	FW	(Algeria) ALG	Zinedine Bensalem	10	0	4	0	0	0	6	0
22	FW	(Algeria) ALG	Réda Sayah	31	10	29	9	2	1	0	0
Players transferred out during the season
4	DF	(Algeria) ALG	Sofiane Harkat	1	0	0	0	0	0	1	0

Last updated: 27 November 2017
Source: fr.soccerway.com

== Transfers ==
=== In ===
Date	Pos	Player	From club	Transfer fee	Source
1 July 2011	DF	(Algeria) Ahmed Amine Belaïd	USM Bel Abbès	Free transfer	
1 July 2011	DF	(Cameroon) Claude Mobitang	(Belgium) UR Namur	Free transfer	
1 July 2011	MF	(Algeria) Nabil Yaâlaoui	JS Kabylie	Free transfer	
1 July 2011	MF	(Algeria) Seddik Berradja	MC Oran	Free transfer	
1 July 2011	MF	(Algeria) Yanis Youssef	USM Blida	Free transfer	
1 July 2011	FW	(Algeria) Réda Sayah	MC Mekhadma	Free transfer	
6 July 2011	FW	(Burkina Faso) Hervé Oussalé	(Iran) Persepolis	Free transfer	
21 July 2011	GK	(Algeria) Faouzi Chaouchi	ES Sétif	Free transfer	
9 August 2011	DF	(Algeria) Abdelmalek Djeghbala	USM El Harrach	Free transfer	
18 August 2011	DF	(Algeria) Walid Cherfa	(Spain) Albacete Balompié	Free transfer	
25 August 2011	MF	(Algeria) Karim Ghazi	USM Alger	Free transfer	
11 December 2011	FW	(Algeria) Sofiane Younes	JS Kabylie	Free transfer	
3 January 2012	FW	(Algeria) Ali Sami Yachir	USM El Harrach	Free transfer	
6 January 2012	FW	(Algeria) Moustapha Djallit	JSM Béjaïa	Free transfer	
13 January 2012	MF	(Algeria) Amir Sayoud	(Egypt) Al Ahly	Loan six month	

=== Out ===
Date	Pos	Player	To club	Transfer fee	Source
1 January 2012	MF	(Algeria) Youssef Sofiane	ES Sétif	Undisclosed	
