= 2013–14 MC Alger season =

MC Alger
2013–14 season
- Chairman: Boudjemâa Boumella
- Head coach: Alain Geiger (until 10 November 2013); Fouad Bouali (from 18 November 2013)
- Stadium: Stade Omar Hamadi
- Ligue 1: 6th
- Algerian Cup: Winner
- Top goalscorer: League: Abderahmane Hachoud (10); All: Abderahmane Hachoud (11)
Home colours

In the 2013–14 season, MC Alger competed in Ligue 1 for the 43rd season, as well as the Algerian Cup. It was their 11th consecutive season in the top flight of Algerian football. They remained in Ligue 1, and went on to win the Algerian Cup. Because of the events of the Algerian Cup final last season club president Omar Gharib was given a life ban, Faouzi Chaouchi and Réda Babouche two years and coach Djamel Menad one year.

== Squad list ==
Players and squad numbers last updated on 18 November 2010.
Note: Flags indicate national team as has been defined under FIFA eligibility rules. Players may hold more than one non-FIFA nationality.

No.	Nat.	Position	Name	Date of Birth (Age)	Signed from
Goalkeepers
	(Algeria)	GK	Houari Djemili	Missing required parameter 1=month! 19 (aged 1993–1994)	(Algeria)
	(Algeria)	GK	Michaël Fabre	Missing required parameter 1=month! 19 (aged 1993–1994)	(Algeria)
	(Algeria)	GK	Farid Chaâl	Missing required parameter 1=month! 19 (aged 1993–1994)	(Algeria)
Defenders
	(Algeria)		Habib Bellaïd	Missing required parameter 1=month! 19 (aged 1993–1994)	(Algeria)
	(Algeria)		Abderahmane Hachoud	Missing required parameter 1=month! 19 (aged 1993–1994)	(Algeria)
	(Algeria)		Amine Aksas	Missing required parameter 1=month! 19 (aged 1993–1994)	(Algeria)
	(Algeria)		Abdelkader Besseghir	Missing required parameter 1=month! 19 (aged 1993–1994)	(Algeria)
	(Algeria)		Abdelmalek Djeghbala	Missing required parameter 1=month! 19 (aged 1993–1994)	(Algeria)
	(Algeria)		Redouane Bachiri	Missing required parameter 1=month! 19 (aged 1993–1994)	(Algeria)
	(Algeria)		Toufik Zeghdane	Missing required parameter 1=month! 19 (aged 1993–1994)	(Algeria)
Midfielders
	(Algeria)		Karim Ghazi	Missing required parameter 1=month! 19 (aged 1993–1994)	(Algeria)
	(Algeria)		Mehdi Kacem	Missing required parameter 1=month! 19 (aged 1993–1994)	(Algeria)
	(Algeria)		Sabri Gharbi	Missing required parameter 1=month! 19 (aged 1993–1994)	(Algeria)
	(Algeria)		Farid Daoud	Missing required parameter 1=month! 19 (aged 1993–1994)	(Algeria)
	(Algeria)		Antar Boucherit	Missing required parameter 1=month! 19 (aged 1993–1994)	(Algeria)
	(Algeria)		Hocine Metref	Missing required parameter 1=month! 19 (aged 1993–1994)	(Algeria)
	(Algeria)		Nabil Yaâlaoui	Missing required parameter 1=month! 19 (aged 1993–1994)	(Algeria)
	(Algeria)		Bilal Moumen	Missing required parameter 1=month! 19 (aged 1993–1994)	(Algeria)
	(Algeria)		Billal Ouali	Missing required parameter 1=month! 19 (aged 1993–1994)	(Algeria)
	(Kenya)		Edwin Lavatsa	Missing required parameter 1=month! 19 (aged 1993–1994)	(Algeria)
	(Algeria)		Oussama Chita	Missing required parameter 1=month! 19 (aged 1993–1994)	(Algeria)
Forwards
	(Algeria)		Ali Sami Yachir	Missing required parameter 1=month! 19 (aged 1993–1994)	(Algeria)
	(Algeria)		Hadj Bouguèche	Missing required parameter 1=month! 19 (aged 1993–1994)	(Algeria)
	(Algeria)		Sid Ali Yahia-Chérif	Missing required parameter 1=month! 19 (aged 1993–1994)	(Algeria)
	(Algeria)		Moustapha Djallit	Missing required parameter 1=month! 19 (aged 1993–1994)	(Algeria)
	(Algeria)		Zinedine Bensalem	Missing required parameter 1=month! 19 (aged 1993–1994)	(Algeria)
	(Algeria)		Réda Sayah	Missing required parameter 1=month! 19 (aged 1993–1994)	(Algeria)
	(Ivory Coast)		Stéphane Paul Dibi	Missing required parameter 1=month! 19 (aged 1993–1994)	(Algeria)
	(Algeria)		Hamid Djaouchi	Missing required parameter 1=month! 19 (aged 1993–1994)	(Algeria)

== Competitions ==
=== Overview ===
Competition	Record								Started round	Final position / round	First match	Last match
Competition	G	W	D	L	GF	GA	GD	Win %	Started round	Final position / round	First match	Last match
Ligue 1	30	13	6	11	26	25	+1	43.33	—N/a	6th	24 August 2013	22 May 2014
Algerian Cup	6	4	2	0	9	3	+6	66.67	Round of 64	Winner	6 December 2013	1 May 2014
Total	36	17	8	11	35	28	+7	47.22				

Updated to match played 9 May 2017
Source: Competitions

== League table ==
Pos	Team	Pld	W	D	L	GF	GA	GD	Pts	Qualification or relegation
4	MC El Eulma	30	13	9	8	38	28	+10	48	Qualification for the Champions League preliminary round
5	USM El Harrach (Note: USM El Harrach would have qualified for the CAF Confederation Cup preliminary round by finishing fourth in the 2013–14 Algerian Ligue Professionnelle 1, but due to the penalty imposed on them by CAF after their withdrawal from the 2014 CAF Champions League, they could not participate.)	30	13	8	9	34	27	+7	47	
6	MC Alger	30	13	6	11	26	25	+1	45	Qualification for the Confederation Cup preliminary round
7	RC Arbaâ (Note: RC Arbaâ would have qualified for the CAF Confederation Cup preliminary round by finishing seventh in the 2013–14 Algerian Ligue Professionnelle 1, after the elimination of the USM El Harrach but were unable to participate because they were not adopted by the CAF as a professional team.)	30	12	8	10	33	32	+1	44	
8	ASO Chlef	30	11	10	9	29	19	+10	43	Qualification for the Confederation Cup preliminary round

Updated to match(es) played on 22 May 2014. Source: DZFoot
Rules for classification: 1) points; 2) head-to-head points; 3) head-to-head goal difference; 4) goal difference; 5) total goals; 6) fairplay ranking; 7) playoff.

=== Results summary ===
Overall								Home						Away					
Pld	W	D	L	GF	GA	GD	Pts	W	D	L	GF	GA	GD	W	D	L	GF	GA	GD
30	13	6	11	26	25	+1	45	9	4	2	20	11	+9	4	2	9	6	14	−8

Last updated: 29 December 2014.
Source: Competitive matches

=== Results by round ===
Round	1	2	3	4	5	6	7	8	9	10	11	12	13	14	15	16	17	18	19	20	21	22	23	24	25	26	27	28	29	30
Ground	A	H	A	H	A	H	A	H	H	A	H	A	H	A	H	H	A	H	A	H	A	H	A	A	H	A	H	A	H	A
Result	W	W	D	W	L	D	L	W	W	L	L	L	W	W	D	W	L	W	W	L	W	D	D	L	W	L	D	L	W	L
Position	6	1	3	4	5	5	6	4	3	4	7	8	6	5	5	5	6	5	3	4	3	4	4	5	4	6	6	6	6	6

Updated to match(es) played on 29 December 2014. Source: Competitive matches
A = Away; H = Home; W = Win; D = Draw; L = Loss

=== Matches ===
24 August 2013 Round 1	JSM Béjaïa	0–1	MC Alger	Béjaïa
17:45		Report	40' Djallit	Stadium: Stade de l'Unité Maghrébine; Referee: Mohamed Ghorbal

31 August 2013 Round 2	MC Alger	3–2	CRB Aïn Fakroun	Algiers
18:00	Yachir 32', 55'; Hachoud 34'	Report	40' A. Kara; 60' Amroune	Stadium: Stade 5 Juillet 1962; Referee: Mohamed Saïdi

3 September 2013 Round 3	MC Oran	1–1	MC Alger	Oran
18:00	Bouaïcha 63'	Report	55' (pen.) Djallit	Stadium: Stade Ahmed Zabana; Referee: Boubekeur Zouaoui

14 September 2013 Round 4	MC Alger	2–1	CR Belouizdad	Algiers
17:45	Kacem 37'; Hachoud 76'	Report	68' Bourakba	Stadium: Stade 5 Juillet 1962; Referee: Farouk Houasnia

21 September 2013 Round 5	USM Alger	1–0	MC Alger	Algiers
17:45	Gasmi 12' (pen.); Feham (yellow card) 7'; Chafaï (yellow card) 34'; Bouchema (yellow card) 70'	Report		Stadium: Stade 5 Juillet 1962; Referee: Redouane Necib

28 September 2013 Round 6	MC Alger	0–0	ASO Chlef	Algiers
18:00		Report		Stadium: Stade Omar Hamadi; Referee: Mehdi Abid Charef

5 October 2013 Round 7	ES Sétif	2–1	MC Alger	Sétif
17:45	Ziti 3'; Karaoui 20'	Report	34' Hachoud	Stadium: Stade 8 Mai 1945; Referee: Mustapha Ghorbal

19 October 2013 Round 8	MC Alger	2–0	RC Arbaâ	Algiers
18:00	Hachoud 28', 64'	Report		Stadium: Stade Omar Hamadi; Referee: Mohamed Benouza

26 October 2013 Round 9	MC Alger	1–0	JS Kabylie	Algiers
17:45	Yahia-Chérif 25'	Report		Stadium: Stade Omar Hamadi; Referee: Djamel Haimoudi

2 November 2013 Round 10	CA Bordj Bou Arréridj	1–0	MC Alger	Bordj Bou Arréridj
17:00	Bachiri 8' (o.g.)	Report		Stadium: Stade 20 Août 1955; Referee: Abderrezzak Arab

8 November 2013 Round 11	MC Alger	0–1	USM El Harrach	Algiers
16:45		Report	12' I. Sylla	Stadium: Stade Omar Hamadi; Referee: Mohamed Bichari

23 November 2013 Round 12	MO Béjaïa	1–0	MC Alger	Béjaïa
18:00	F. Rahal 84'	Report		Stadium: Stade de l'Unité Maghrébine; Referee: Rafik Achouri

30 November 2013 Round 13	MC Alger	3–0	JS Saoura	Algiers
18:00	Aksas 22', 51'; Hachoud 82'	Report		Stadium: Stade Omar Hamadi; Referee: Redouane Necib

14 December 2013 Round 14	CS Constantine	0–1	MC Alger	Constantine
16:00		Report	74' Bouguèche	Stadium: Stade Mohamed Hamlaoui; Referee: Farouk Mial

28 December 2013 Round 15	MC Alger	0–0	MC El Eulma	Algiers
16:00		Report		Stadium: Stade Omar Hamadi; Referee: Youssef Zerrouki

18 January 2014 Round 16	MC Alger	2–1	JSM Béjaïa	Algiers
16:00	Djallit 72', 90+5' (pen.)	Report	21' Niati	Stadium: Stade Omar Hamadi; Referee: Mohamed Saïdi

1 February 2014 Round 17	CRB Aïn Fakroun	1–0	MC Alger	Aïn M'lila
15:00	Amroune 73'	Report		Stadium: Stade des Frères Demane Debbih; Referee: Mohamed Bachir

8 February 2014 Round 18	MC Alger	2–0	MC Oran	Algiers
16:00	Hachoud 43'; Bouguèche 50'	Report		Stadium: Stade Omar Hamadi; Attendance: 0 (close doors); Referee: Abderrezzak Arab

14 February 2014 Round 19	CR Belouizdad	0–1	MC Alger	Algiers
16:00		Report	90+5' Zeghdane	Stadium: Stade 20 Août 1955; Referee: Mohamed Saïdi

22 February 2014 Round 20	MC Alger	0–3	USM Alger	Blida
16:00		Report	38' (yellow card) 78' Ziaya; 47' Chafaï; 81' (yellow card) 82' Gasmi; (yellow card) 17' Koudri	Stadium: Stade Mustapha Tchaker; Referee: Mohamed Bichari

1 March 2014 Round 21	ASO Chlef	0–1	MC Alger	Chlef
17:45		Report	19' Aksas	Stadium: Stade Mohamed Boumezrag; Referee: Boubekeur Zouaoui

5 March 2014 Round 22	MC Alger	1–1	ES Sétif	Algiers
14:30	Hachoud 90'	Report	27' Tiaïba	Stadium: Stade Omar Hamadi; Referee: Said Aouina

15 March 2014 Round 23	RC Arbaâ	0–0	MC Alger	Blida
15:00		Report		Stadium: Stade Frères Brakni; Referee: Mohamed Benouza

22 March 2014 Round 24	JS Kabylie	3–0	MC Alger	Tizi Ouzou
15:00	Rial 31'; Bencherifa 45'; Ebossé Bodjongo 83' (pen.)	Report		Stadium: Stade du 1er Novembre 1954; Referee: Mohamed Saïdi

25 April 2014 Round 25	MC Alger	1–0	CA Bordj Bou Arréridj	Algiers
17:00	Hachoud 24'	Report		Stadium: Stade Omar Hamadi; Referee: Mohamed Bachir

6 May 2014 Round 26	USM El Harrach	1–0	MC Alger	Algiers
17:00	B. Mebarki 51'	Report		Stadium: Stade 1er Novembre 1954; Referee: Farouk Houasnia

10 May 2014 Round 27	MC Alger	2–2	MO Béjaïa	Algiers
17:00	Boucherit 26' (pen.); Hachoud 90+2'	Report	45' (pen.) F. Rahal; 67' D. Akrour	Stadium: Stade Omar Hamadi; Referee: Redouane Necib

13 May 2014 Round 28	JS Saoura	2–0	MC Alger	Béchar
17:00	Beldjilali 57' (pen.); M. Mebarki 90+4'	Report		Stadium: Stade 20 Août 1955; Referee: Lahlou Benbraham

17 May 2014 Round 29	MC Alger	1–0	CS Constantine	Algiers
17:00	Hachoud 90+1'	Report		Stadium: Stade Omar Hamadi; Attendance: 0 (close doors); Referee: Mohamed Boukhalfa

24 May 2014 Round 30	MC El Eulma	1–0	MC Alger	El Eulma
17:00	Belkhiter 78'	Report		Stadium: Stade Messaoud Zougar; Referee: Mohamed Bachir

== Algerian Cup ==
7 December 2013 Round of 64	MC Alger	2–0	ASO Chlef	Algiers
17:30	Djallit 63'; Hachoud 79'			Stadium: Stade Omar Hamadi

20 December 2013 Round of 32	MC Alger	1–0	CRB Ben Badis	Algiers
16:00	Hachoud 24'			Stadium: Stade Omar Hamadi; Referee: Bouchama, Bourahla, Guessoum

25 January 2014 Round of 16	US Chaouia	2–2 (a.e.t.) (2–4 p)	MC Alger	Oum El Bouaghi
15:00	Goumidi 13'; H. Demane 44'		83' Yahia-Chérif; 90' (pen.) Djallit	Stadium: Stade Hassouna-Zerdani; Attendance: 10.000; Referee: Ghorbal, Serradj, Cherchar

18 February 2014 Quarter-final	USMM Hadjout	0–1	MC Alger	Hadjout
14:30			1' Djallit	Stadium: Stade du 5-Juillet 1962; Attendance: 14.000; Referee: Benouza, Bouhassoune, Omari

29 March 2014 Semi-final	JSM Chéraga	0–2	MC Alger	Algiers
17:45			27' Bouguèche; 36' Gharbi	Stadium: Stade Omar Hamadi; Attendance: 18.000; Referee: Arab, Bazine, Moukar

1 May 2013 Final	JS Kabylie	1–1 (a.e.t.) (4 – 5 p)	MC Alger	Blida
16:00	Rial 88' (pen.)		4' (o.g.) Rial	Stadium: Stade Mustapha Tchaker; Attendance: 35,000; Referee: Mohamed Bichari
	Penalties
	Rial (penalty missed); Remache (penalty scored); Raiah (penalty scored); Ebossé (penalty scored)... (penalty scored)		(penalty scored) Yachir; (penalty scored) ... (penalty scored) Bouguèche; (penalty scored) Djeghbala; (penalty scored) Gharbi

== Squad information ==
=== Playing statistics ===
No.	Pos	Nat	Player	Total		Ligue 1		Algerian Cup	
No.	Pos	Nat	Player	Apps	Goals	Apps	Goals	Apps	Goals
12	GK	(Algeria) ALG	Houari Djemili	36	0	30	0	6	0
2	DF	(Algeria) ALG	Habib Bellaïd	18	0	15	0	3	0
27	DF	(Algeria) ALG	Abderahmane Hachoud	33	12	27	10	6	2
5	DF	(Algeria) ALG	Amine Aksas	24	3	21	3	3	0
11	DF	(Algeria) ALG	Abdelkader Besseghir	15	0	13	0	2	0
16	DF	(Algeria) ALG	Karim Ghazi	26	0	20	0	6	0
30	DF	(Algeria) ALG	Abdelmalek Djeghbala	20	0	16	0	4	0
13	DF	(Algeria) ALG	Redouane Bachiri	22	0	19	0	3	0
3	DF	(Algeria) ALG	Toufik Zeghdane	31	1	25	1	6	0
8	MF	(Algeria) ALG	Mehdi Kacem	26	1	23	1	3	0
26	MF	(Algeria) ALG	Sabri Gharbi	19	1	16	0	3	1
18	MF	(Algeria) ALG	Farid Daoud	15	0	12	0	3	0
20	MF	(Algeria) ALG	Antar Boucherit	16	1	12	1	4	0
23	MF	(Algeria) ALG	Hocine Metref	10	0	9	0	1	0
	MF	(Algeria) ALG	Nabil Yaâlaoui	6	0	5	0	1	0
	MF	(Algeria) ALG	Bilal Moumen	2	0	2	0	0	0
10	MF	(Algeria) ALG	Billal Ouali	18	0	15	0	3	0
34	MF	(Kenya) KEN	Edwin Lavatsa	6	0	4	0	2	0
	MF	(Algeria) ALG	Oussama Chita	9	0	8	0	1	0
21	FW	(Algeria) ALG	Ali Sami Yachir	28	2	24	2	4	0
99	FW	(Algeria) ALG	Hadj Bouguèche	29	3	24	2	5	1
7	FW	(Algeria) ALG	Sid Ali Yahia-Chérif	32	2	26	1	6	1
17	FW	(Algeria) ALG	Moustapha Djallit	28	8	23	5	5	3
31	FW	(Algeria) ALG	Zinedine Bensalem	3	0	3	0	0	0
	FW	(Algeria) ALG	Réda Sayah	12	0	10	0	2	0
36	FW	(Ivory Coast) CIV	Stéphane Paul Dibi	5	0	3	0	2	0
	FW	(Algeria) ALG	Hamid Djaouchi	2	0	2	0	0	0
Players transferred out during the season

Last updated: 9 October 2017
Source: fr.soccerway.com

== Transfers ==
=== In ===
Date	Pos	Player	From club	Transfer fee	Source
19 June 2013	DF	(Algeria) Habib Bellaïd	(France) Sedan	Free transfer	
28 June 2013	FW	(Algeria) Sid Ali Yahia-Chérif	(France) Istres	6,000,000 DA	
30 June 2013	MF	(Algeria) Bilal Moumen	USM Bel-Abbès	Return from loan	
30 June 2013	MF	(Algeria) Nabil Yaâlaoui	WA Tlemcen	Return from loan	
30 June 2013	FW	(Algeria) Réda Sayah	CS Constantine	Return from loan	
1 July 2013	GK	(Algeria) Michaël Fabre	(France) Clermont Foot	Free transfer	
1 July 2013	MF	(Algeria) Sabri Gharbi	ASO Chlef	Free transfer	
19 July 2013	DF	(Algeria) Toufik Zeghdane	(France) Sedan	Undisclosed	
1 December 2013	MF	(Algeria) Oussama Chita	Reserve team	First Professional Contract	
1 December 2013	FW	(Algeria) Hamid Djaouchi	Reserve team	First Professional Contract	
11 January 2014	MF	(Kenya) Edwin Lavatsa	(Kenya) Gor Mahia	Undisclosed	
12 January 2014	MF	(Algeria) Antar Boucherit	CS Constantine	Undisclosed	
13 January 2014	FW	(Ivory Coast) Stéphane Paul Dibi	(Egypt) Tersana SC	Undisclosed	

=== Out ===
Date	Pos	Player	To club	Transfer fee	Source
8 July 2013	MF	(Algeria) Billel Attafen	CR Belouizdad	Free transfer	
10 January 2014	MF	(Algeria) Réda Sayah	CS Constantine	Loan	
