= 2013 Algerian Cup final =

- Stade du 5 Juillet hosted the match
- Event: 2012–13 Algerian Cup
MC Alger	USM Alger
0	1
- Date: May 1, 2013
- Venue: Stade 5 Juillet 1962, Algiers
- Referee: Djamel Haimoudi
- Attendance: 70.000
- Weather: Sunny

The 2013 Algerian Cup final was the 49th final of the Algerian Cup. The final took place on May 1, 2013, at Stade 5 Juillet 1962 in Algiers with kick-off at 16:00. USM Alger beat MC Alger 1-0 to win their eighth Algerian Cup.

Algerian Ligue Professionnelle 1 clubs MC Alger and USM Alger will contest the final, in what will be the 92nd edition of the Algiers derby. The competition winners are awarded a berth in the 2014 CAF Confederation Cup.

== Pre-match ==
MC Alger were appearing in an Algerian Cup final for a seventh time. They had won the cup six times previously (in 1971, 1973, 1976, 1983, 2006, 2007) and had never lost in the final, with four of their six final wins came against USM Alger. USM Alger were appearing in a final a record seventeenth time and had won the cup seven times previously (in 1981, 1988, 1997, 1999, 2001, 2003, 2004).

=== Details ===
May 1, 2013
16:00

MC Alger	0–1	USM Alger
		17' Mokhtar Benmoussa

Stade 5 Juillet 1962, Algiers
Attendance: 70,000
Referee: Djamel Haimoudi

MC Alger	USM Alger

GK	1	(Algeria) Faouzi Chaouchi
RB	11	(Algeria) Abdelkader Besseghir (c)
CB	13	(Algeria) Redouane Bachiri
CB	4	(Algeria) Amine Aksas
LB	15	(Algeria) Réda Babouche		(yellow card) 35'
CM	6	(Algeria) Karim Ghazi
CM	8	(Algeria) Mehdi Kacem	(substituted off) 85'
CM	23	(Algeria) Hocine Metref
RF	17	(Algeria) Moustapha Djallit
CF	21	(Algeria) Ali Sami Yachir	(substituted off) 67'
LF	99	(Algeria) Hadj Bouguèche
Substitutes:
MF	7	(Algeria) Billel Attafen	(substituted on) 67'	(yellow card) 69'
MF	10	(Algeria) Billal Ouali	(substituted on) 85'
GK	12	(Algeria) Houari Djemili
MF	14	(Algeria) Nabil Yaâlaoui
FW	24	(Algeria) Bilal Moumen
DF	27	(Algeria) Abderahmane Hachoud
DF	30	(Algeria) Abdelmalek Djeghbala
Manager:
(Algeria) Djamel Menad

GK	1	(Algeria) Lamine Zemmamouche		(yellow card) 90'
RB	47	(Algeria) Zinedine Ferhat		(yellow card) 62'
CB	20	(Algeria) Nacereddine Khoualed (c)		(yellow card) 60'
CB	6	(Algeria) Farouk Chafaï
LB	26	(Algeria) Brahim Bedbouda
CM	13	(Algeria) Nassim Bouchema		(yellow card) 82'
CM	23	(Algeria) Hamza Koudri
RW	8	(Algeria) Ahmed Gasmi	(substituted off) 90+4'	(yellow card) 20'
AM	14	(Algeria) Lamouri Djediat	(substituted off) 74'	(yellow card) 44'
LW	25	(Algeria) Mokhtar Benmoussa		(yellow card) 35'
CF	9	(Algeria) Noureddine Daham	(substituted off) 56'
Substitutes:
DF	4	(Algeria) Abdelkader Laïfaoui
MF	11	(Algeria) Hocine El Orfi
FW	12	(Madagascar) Carolus Andriamatsinoro	(substituted on) 74'
MF	15	(Algeria) Bouazza Feham	(substituted on) 56'
GK	16	(Algeria) Ismaïl Mansouri
DF	24	(Algeria) Youcef Benamara	(substituted on) 90+4'
FW	99	(Algeria) Abdelmalek Ziaya
Manager:
(France) Rolland Courbis

|}

MATCH OFFICIALS

- Assistant referees:
  - Mokrane Gourari
  - Choukri Bechirène
- Fourth official:
  - Farouk Mial
