= 2010–11 WA Tlemcen season =

WA Tlemcen
2010–11 season
- Head coach: Abdelkader Amrani
- Stadium: Stade Akid Lotfi
- Ligue 1: 12th
- Algerian Cup: Round of 64
- Top goalscorer: League: Anwar Mohamed Boudjakdji (7); All: Anwar Mohamed Boudjakdji (7)

In the 2010–11 season, WA Tlemcen is competing in the Ligue 1 for the 26th season, as well as the Algerian Cup. It is their 2nd consecutive season in the top flight of Algerian football. They will be competing in Ligue 1, and the Algerian Cup.

== Squad list ==
Players and squad numbers last updated on 18 November 2010.
Note: Flags indicate national team as has been defined under FIFA eligibility rules. Players may hold more than one non-FIFA nationality.

No.	Nat.	Position	Name	Date of birth (age)	Signed from
Goalkeepers
19	(Algeria)	GK	Samir Hadjaoui	16 February 1979 (aged 31)	(Algeria) JS Kabylie
12	(Algeria)	GK	Houari Djemili	15 May 1987 (aged 23)	(Algeria) Youth system
22	(Algeria)	GK	Zakaria Bereksi Reguig	14 March 1989 (aged 21)	(Algeria) Youth system
Defenders
18	(Algeria)	CB	Kamel Habri	5 March 1976 (aged 34)	(Algeria) JSM Bejaïa
5	(Algeria)	CB	Anwar Boudjakdji	1 September 1976 (aged 34)	(Algeria) MC Oran
11	(Algeria)	LB	Rachid Benharoun	14 January 1990 (aged 20)	(Algeria) Youth system
13	(Algeria)	CB	Redouane Bachiri	27 October 1982 (aged 28)	(Algeria) MC Oran
27	(Algeria)	LB	Kheireddine Boukhiar	28 August 1987 (aged 23)	(Algeria) Youth system
23	(Algeria)	RB	Amine Boulahia	3 February 1987 (aged 23)	(Algeria) A Bou Saâda
16	(Algeria)		Karim Seggar	7 September 1989 (aged 21)	Unknown
4	(Algeria)		Soufyane Saidi	3 March 1989 (aged 21)	Unknown
	(Algeria)	RB	Soufyane Mebarki	13 May 1986 (aged 24)	(Algeria) CR Belouizdad
15	(Algeria)		Bilal Abdessamad Bennaceur	19 June 1990 (aged 20)	(Algeria) Youth system
	(Algeria)		Takfarinas Ait Hamlat	16 October 1980 (aged 30)	(Algeria) WR Bentalha
2	(Algeria)	RB	Abdelhadi Kada Benyacine	5 August 1990 (aged 20)	(Algeria) Youth system
Midfielders
8	(Algeria)	AM	Tayeb Berramla	6 January 1985 (aged 25)	(Algeria) MC Oran
6	(Algeria)	LM	Nassim Zazoua Khames	31 March 1986 (aged 24)	Unknown
21	(Algeria)		Cherif Rabta	12 November 1984 (aged 26)	Unattached
24	(Algeria)	DM	Ilyes Sidhoum	10 August 1989 (aged 21)	(Algeria) Youth system
7	(Algeria)	LM	Sofiane Chaïb	21 May 1981 (aged 29)	Unknown
20	(Algeria)	DM	Rabie Belgherri	7 October 1977 (aged 33)	(Algeria) IRB Maghnia
28	(Algeria)	RW	Abou El Kacem Hadji	22 August 1990 (aged 20)	(Algeria) Youth system
21	(Algeria)	CF	Bahi Lazaref	12 November 1984 (aged 26)	(Algeria) WR Bentalha
17	(Algeria)		Larbi Mekchiche	23 January 1982 (aged 28)	Unknown
	(Algeria)	AM	Abdelhakim Sameur	12 November 1990 (aged 20)	(Algeria) USM Khenchela
Forwards
14	(Algeria)	CF	Yassine Boukhari	9 June 1986 (aged 24)	(Algeria) ASO Chlef
	(Algeria)	CF	Ibrahim Bousehaba	2 December 1985 (aged 25)	(Algeria) CR Belouizdad
9	(Algeria)		Abdelkhalek Guedider	8 October 1990 (aged 20)	(Algeria) Youth system
	(Madagascar)	RW	Carolus Andriamatsinoro	6 July 1989 (aged 21)	(Algeria) Paradou AC
	(Algeria)		Abderrahmane Aini	11 May 1993 (aged 17)	Unknown
	(Algeria)		Abdelkader Benabdelmoumene	5 March 1991 (aged 19)	Unknown

== Competitions ==
=== Overview ===
Competition	Record								Started round	Final position / round	First match	Last match
Competition	G	W	D	L	GF	GA	GD	Win %	Started round	Final position / round	First match	Last match
Ligue 1	30	10	7	13	35	36	−1	33.33	—N/a	12th	25 September 2010	8 July 2011
Algerian Cup	1	0	0	1	0	2	−2	0.00	Round of 64		1 January 2011	
Total	31	10	7	14	35	38	−3	32.26				

Updated to match played 9 May 2017
Source: Competitions

== League table ==
Pos	Team	Pld	W	D	L	GF	GA	GD	Pts	Qualification or relegation
10	MC Alger	30	8	13	9	30	28	+2	37	
11	JS Kabylie	30	10	7	13	26	37	−11	37	
12	WA Tlemcen	30	10	7	13	35	36	−1	37	
13	MC El Eulma	30	9	9	12	32	40	−8	36	
14	USM Annaba (R)	30	10	6	14	23	34	−11	36	Relegation to Ligue Professionnelle 2

Updated to match(es) played on 19 April 2018. Source: DZFoot
Rules for classification: 1) points; 2) head-to-head points; 3) head-to-head goal difference; 4) goal difference; 5) total goals; 6) fairplay ranking; 7) playoff.
(R) Relegated

=== Results summary ===
Overall								Home						Away					
Pld	W	D	L	GF	GA	GD	Pts	W	D	L	GF	GA	GD	W	D	L	GF	GA	GD
30	10	7	13	35	36	−1	37	8	4	3	27	13	+14	2	3	10	8	23	−15

Last updated: 29 December 2014.
Source: Competitive matches

=== Results by round ===
Round	1	2	3	4	5	6	7	8	9	10	11	12	13	14	15	16	17	18	19	20	21	22	23	24	25	26	27	28	29	30
Ground																														
Result																														
Position																														

Source: Competitive matches
A = Away; H = Home; W = Win; D = Draw; L = Loss

=== Matches ===
Win Draw Loss

25 September 2010 Round 1	WA Tlemcen	2–0	USM Annaba	Tlemcen
16:00	Belgherri 40' (pen.); Boukhari 64'	Soccerway report		Stadium: Stade Akid Lotfi; Referee: Mohamed Bichari

1 October 2010 Round 2	ES Sétif	3–1	WA Tlemcen	Sétif
20:00	Hachoud 27'; Hadj Aïssa 30'; Boucherit 84'	Soccerway report	Berramla 24'	Stadium: Stade 8 Mai 1945; Referee: Mokhtar Amalou

15 October 2010 Round 3	WA Tlemcen	1–2	USM Alger	Tlemcen
19:00	Boudjakdji 72'	Soccerway report	65' Achiou; 68' Daham	Stadium: Stade Akid Lotfi; Referee: Farid Bahloul

22 October 2010 Round 4	WA Tlemcen	1–2	MC Saïda	Tlemcen
16:00	Boukhiar 53'	Soccerway report	Hadiouche 3', 36'	Stadium: Stade Akid Lotfi; Referee: Djamel Haimoudi

26 October 2010 Round 5	JSM Béjaïa	0–1	WA Tlemcen	Béjaïa
16:00		Soccerway report	Hadji 69'	Stadium: Stade de l'Unité Maghrébine; Referee: Rafik Achouri

29 October 2010 Round 6	WA Tlemcen	2–2	USM El Harrach	Tlemcen
19:00	Boulahia 28'; Belgherri 60' (pen.)	Soccerway report	Hanitser 4'; Boualem 74'	Stadium: Stade Akid Lotfi; Referee: Redouane Necib

6 November 2010 Round 7	AS Khroub	2–1	WA Tlemcen	El Khroub
14:30	Leghzal 18' (pen.); Chekatti 88'	Soccerway report	Belgherri 45' (pen.)	Stadium: Stade Abed Hamdani; Referee: Farouk Mial

12 November 2010 Round 8	WA Tlemcen	0–0	USM Blida	Tlemcen
17:00		Soccerway report		Stadium: Stade Akid Lotfi; Referee: Mehdi Abid Charef

27 November 2010 Round 9	JS Kabylie	3–0	WA Tlemcen	Tizi Ouzou
14:30	Tedjar 27'; Aoudia 52', 57' (pen.)	Soccerway report		Stadium: Stade 1er Novembre 1954; Referee: Mohamed Haddada

3 December 2010 Round 10	WA Tlemcen	1–2	MC Alger	Tlemcen
15:00	Lazaref 90+3'	Soccerway report	Mokdad 20'; Amroune 54' (pen.)	Stadium: Stade Akid Lotfi; Referee: Farid Bahloul

11 December 2010 Round 11	MC El Eulma	0–0	WA Tlemcen	El Eulma
14:30		Soccerway report		Stadium: Stade Messaoud Zougar; Referee: Farouk Mial

17 December 2010 Round 12	WA Tlemcen	2–1	MC Oran	Tlemcen
14:30	Lazaref 36'; Bachiri 81'	Soccerway report	Berradja 90'	Stadium: Stade Akid Lotfi; Referee: Sofiane Bousseter

24 December 2010 Round 13	CR Belouizdad	1–0	WA Tlemcen	Belouizdad
15:00	Herida 38'	Soccerway report		Stadium: Stade 20 Août 1955; Referee: Redouane Necib

19 February 2011 Round 14	WA Tlemcen	5–1	CA Bordj Bou Arreridj	Tlemcen
14:30	Chaïb 12', 40'; Boudjakdji 67', 89'; Rabta 85'	Soccerway report	Abed Bahtsou 8'	Stadium: Stade Akid Lotfi; Referee: Mokhtar Amalou

11 March 2011 Round 15	ASO Chlef	3–1	WA Tlemcen	Chlef
18:00	Soudani 18'; Messaoud 50'; Mongolo 89'	Soccerway report	Boulahia 24'	Stadium: Stade Mohamed Boumezrag; Referee: Mohamed Bichari

19 March 2011 Round 16	USM Annaba	1–1	WA Tlemcen	Annaba
14:00	Herbache 44'	Soccerway report	Andria 90+2'	Stadium: Stade 19 Mai 1956; Referee: Merzak Halalchi

29 March 2011 Round 17	WA Tlemcen	1–1	ES Sétif	Tlemcen
15:30	Sameur 13'	Soccerway report	Hadj Aïssa 60'	Stadium: Stade Akid Lotfi; Referee: Sofiane Bousseter

1 April 2011 Round 18	USM Alger	0–0	WA Tlemcen	Bologhine
18:00		Soccerway report		Stadium: Omar Hamadi Stadium; Referee: Farouk Mial

15 April 2011 Round 19	MC Saïda	5–2	WA Tlemcen	Saida
17:00	Cheraïtia 4', 40'; Madouni 7', 48', 75'	Soccerway report	Boudjakdji 78' (pen.); Mebarki 81'	Stadium: April 13, 1958 Stadium; Referee: Mohamed Sahraoui

25 April 2011 Round 20	WA Tlemcen	1–1	JSM Béjaïa	Tlemcen
17:00	Sameur 21'	Soccerway report	Megateli 41'	Stadium: Stade Akid Lotfi; Referee: Mehdi Abid Charef

7 May 2011 Round 21	USM El Harrach	1–0	WA Tlemcen	Algiers
17:00	Yachir 30'	Soccerway report		Stadium: Stade 1er Novembre 1954; Referee: Rafik Achouri

14 May 2011 Round 22	WA Tlemcen	2–0	AS Khroub	Tlemcen
17:00	Bachiri 28'; Mebarki 42'	Soccerway report		Stadium: Stade Akid Lotfi; Referee: Merzak Halalchi

21 May 2011 Round 23	USM Blida	1–0	WA Tlemcen	Blida
16:00	Belkheir 50'	Soccerway report		Stadium: Stade Mustapha Tchaker; Referee: Mohamed Haddada

14 June 2011 Round 24	WA Tlemcen	2–1	JS Kabylie	Tlemcen
18:00	Mebarki 3'; Andria 76'	Soccerway report	Nessakh 50'	Stadium: Stade Akid Lotfi; Referee: Boubekeur Zouaoui

18 June 2011 Round 25	MC Alger	1–0	WA Tlemcen	Bologhine
20:00	Bensalem 59'	Soccerway report		Stadium: Omar Hammadi Stadium; Referee: Mehdi Abid Charef

11 June 2011 Round 26	WA Tlemcen	2–0	MC El Eulma	Tlemcen
18:00	Sameur 18'; Belgherri 23' (pen.)	Soccerway report		Stadium: Stade Akid Lotfi; Referee: Mohamed Bichari

25 June 2011 Round 27	MC Oran	2–0	WA Tlemcen	Oran
18:00	Belaïli 50'; Berradja 79'	Soccerway report		Stadium: Ahmed Zabana Stadium; Referee: Farouk Mial

28 June 2011 Round 28	WA Tlemcen	4–0	CR Belouizdad	Tlemcen
18:00	Sameur 40', 84'; Boudjakdji 58', 73'	Soccerway report		Stadium: Stade Akid Lotfi; Referee: Rafik Achouri

1 July 2011 Round 29	CA Bordj Bou Arreridj	0–1	WA Tlemcen	Bordj Bou Arréridj
18:00		Soccerway report	Boudjakdji 40'	Stadium: Stade 20 Août 1955; Referee: Farouk Houasnia

8 July 2011 Round 30	WA Tlemcen	1–0	ASO Chlef	Tlemcen
18:00	Bousehaba 53'	Soccerway report		Stadium: Stade Akid Lotfi; Referee: Boubekeur Zouaoui

== Algerian Cup ==
1 January 2011 Round of 64	ASO Chlef	2–0	WA Tlemcen	Chlef
14:30	Messaoud 13', 52'	Report		Stadium: Stade Mohamed Boumezrag; Referee: Boubekeur Zouaoui
Note: Lineup for WA Tlemcen - Djemili - Bennacer (Kada 57’), Bachiri, Habri, Boukhiar - S. Chaïb, Sidhoum, Rabta, Berramla - Boudjakdji (Benharoune 75’), Lazaref (Benabdelmoumen 66’).

== Squad information ==
=== Playing statistics ===
No.	Pos	Nat	Player	Total		Ligue 1		Algerian Cup	
No.	Pos	Nat	Player	Apps	Goals	Apps	Goals	Apps	Goals
Goalkeepers
19	GK	(Algeria) ALG	Samir Hadjaoui	9	0	9	0	0	0
12	GK	(Algeria) ALG	Houari Djemili	20	0	19	0	1	0
22	GK	(Algeria) ALG	Zakaria Bereksi Reguig	2	0	2	0	0	0
Defenders
18	DF	(Algeria) ALG	Kamel Habri	20	0	19	0	1	0
5	DF	(Algeria) ALG	Anwar Boudjakdji	26	7	25	7	1	0
13	DF	(Algeria) ALG	Redouane Bachiri	28	2	27	2	1	0
27	DF	(Algeria) ALG	Kheireddine Boukhiar	21	1	20	1	1	0
23	DF	(Algeria) ALG	Amine Boulahia	21	2	21	2	0	0
16	DF	(Algeria) ALG	Karim Seggar	2	0	2	0	0	0
4	DF	(Algeria) ALG	Soufyane Saidi	1	0	1	0	0	0
	DF	(Algeria) ALG	Soufyane Mebarki	13	3	13	3	0	0
15	DF	(Algeria) ALG	Bilal Abdessamad Bennaceur	11	0	10	0	1	0
	DF	(Algeria) ALG	Takfarinas Ait Hamlat	8	0	8	0	0	0
Midfielders
8	MF	(Algeria) ALG	Tayeb Berramla	14	1	13	1	1	0
6	MF	(Algeria) ALG	Nassim Zazoua Khames	2	0	2	0	0	0
21	MF	(Algeria) ALG	Cherif Rabta	15	1	14	1	1	0
24	MF	(Algeria) ALG	Ilyes Sidhoum	29	0	28	0	1	0
7	MF	(Algeria) ALG	Sofiane Chaïb	26	2	25	2	1	0
20	MF	(Algeria) ALG	Rabie Belgherri	23	4	23	4	0	0
28	MF	(Algeria) ALG	Abou El Kacem Hadji	18	1	18	1	0	0
2	MF	(Algeria) ALG	Abdelhadi Kada Benyacine	15	0	14	0	1	0
21	MF	(Algeria) ALG	Bahi Lazaref	21	2	20	2	1	0
17	MF	(Algeria) ALG	Larbi Mekchiche	1	0	1	0	0	0
	MF	(Algeria) ALG	Abdelhakim Sameur	13	5	13	5	0	0
Forwards
14	FW	(Algeria) ALG	Yassine Boukhari	14	1	14	1	0	0
	FW	(Algeria) ALG	Ibrahim Bousehaba	11	1	11	1	0	0
11	FW	(Algeria) ALG	Rachid Benharoun	6	0	5	0	1	0
9	FW	(Algeria) ALG	Abdelkhalek Guedider	3	0	3	0	0	0
	FW	(Madagascar) MAD	Carolus Andriamatsinoro	10	2	10	2	0	0
	FW	(Algeria) ALG	Abderrahmane Aini	1	0	1	0	0	0
	FW	(Algeria) ALG	Abdelkader Benabdelmoumene	3	0	2	0	1	0
Players transferred out during the season

Last updated: 27 November 2017
Source: fr.soccerway.com

== Transfers ==
=== In ===
Date	Pos	Player	From club	Transfer fee	Source
4 June 2010	GK	(Algeria) Samir Hadjaoui	JS Kabylie	Free transfer	
1 July 2010	MF	(Algeria) (Sweden) Nadir Benchenaa	(Sweden) Dalkurd FF	Free transfer	
1 July 2010	MF	(Algeria) Abdelhakim Sameur	USM Khenchela	Free transfer	
1 July 2010	MF	(Algeria) Tayeb Berramla	MC Oran	Free transfer	
1 July 2010	FW	(Algeria) Yassine Boukhari	ASO Chlef	Free transfer	
27 December 2010	FW	(Algeria) Ibrahim Bousehaba	CR Belouizdad	Loan for one & a half year	
31 January 2011	FW	(Madagascar) Carolus Andriamatsinoro	Paradou AC	Loan for one & a half year	

=== Out ===
Date	Pos	Player	To club	Transfer fee	Source
6 June 2010	MF	(Algeria) Nabil Yaâlaoui	JS Kabylie	Free transfer	
10 June 2010	FW	(Algeria) Moustapha Djallit	ES Sétif	Free transfer	
18 June 2010	FW	(Algeria) Youcef Ghazali	ES Sétif	20,000,000 DA	
1 July 2010	MF	(Algeria) Nourredine Abdellaoui	MC El Eulma	Free transfer	
