= Belaid =

Belaid or typically Belaïd (Arabic: بلعيد) is both an Arabic surname and masculine given name. Notable people with the name include:

== Surname ==
- Amine Belaïd (born 1988), Algerian football player
- Aymen Belaïd (born 1989), French-Tunisian football player, brother of Tijani
- Chokri Belaïd (1964–2013), Tunisian lawyer and politician
- Khaled Belaïd (born 1973), Tunisian volleyball player
- Tijani Belaïd (born 1987), French-Tunisian football player
- Zineddine Belaïd (born 1999), Algerian football player

== Given name ==
- Belaid Abdessalam (1928–2020), Algerian politician
- Belaïd Abrika (born 1969), Algerian economist and academic
- Khaled Belaid Abumdas (born 1987), Libyan snooker player
- Belaïd Lacarne (1940–2024), Algerian football referee

== See also ==
- Alice Belaïdi (born 1987), French actress
