= Algerian professional football awards =

The Algerian professional football awards is a collection of football awards given at the end of each season since 2008. Back then, the only award was the Manager of the Year. There are now 3 awards: Footballer, Goalkeeper and Manager. The previous fourth award, the Young Footballer of the Year Award, has no longer been handed out since 2008. The voters are all the players from the Algerian Ligue Professionnelle 1 as well as the Algerian footballers playing abroad at the highest level. The ceremony is organized together by the paper Maracana Foot and the Algerian Football Federation.

== Palmares ==
=== Professional Footballer of the Year ===
| Season | Winner | Club | Country |
|---|---|---|---|
| 2007–08 | Farid Cheklam | ASO Chlef | Algeria |
| 2008–09 | Mohamed Rabie Meftah | JS Kabylie | Algeria |
not awarded in 2009–10
| 2010–11 | El Arbi Hillel Soudani | ASO Chlef | Algeria |
| 2011–12 | Abdelmoumene Djabou | USM El Harrach | Algeria |
| 2012–13 | Mourad Delhoum | ES Sétif | Algeria |
| 2013–14 | Abderahmane Hachoud | MC Alger | Algeria |
| 2014–15 | Toufik Zerara | ES Sétif | Algeria |
| 2015–16 | Amir Sayoud | DRB Tadjenanet | Algeria |
not awarded in 2016–17

=== Young Professional Footballer of the Year ===
| Season | Winner | Club | Country |
|---|---|---|---|
| 2007–08 | Hamza Koudri | MC Alger | Algeria |
| 2008–09 | Islam Adel Aït Ali Yahia | USM Alger | Algeria |
not awarded in 2009–10
| 2010–11 | Brahim Boudebouda | MC Alger | Algeria |
| 2011–12 | Farouk Chafaï | USM Alger | Algeria |
| 2012–13 | Zinedine Ferhat | USM Alger | Algeria |
| 2013–14 | Toufik Zeghdane | MC Alger | Algeria |
| 2014–15 | Oussama Darfalou | RC Arbaâ | Algeria |
| 2015–16 | Mohammed Benkhemassa | USM Alger | Algeria |
not awarded in 2016–17

=== Professional Goalkeeper of the Year ===
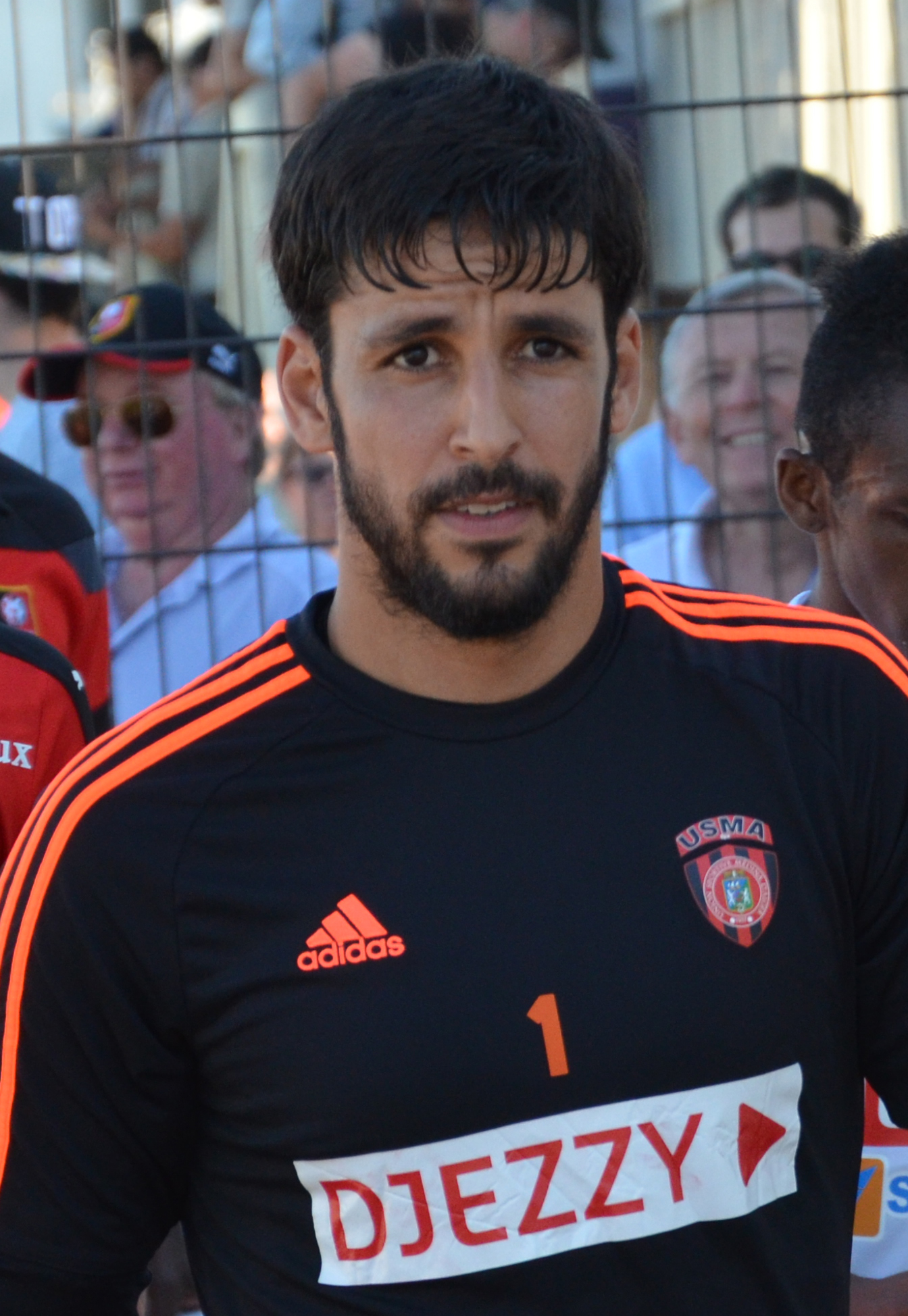
Lamine Zemmamouche won more than three awards for the best goalkeeper in 2011, 2013 and 2014.

| Season | Winner | Club | Country |
|---|---|---|---|
| 2007–08 | Lounès Gaouaoui | WA Tlemcen | Algeria |
| 2008–09 | Faouzi Chaouchi | JS Kabylie | Algeria |
not awarded in 2009–10
| 2010–11 | Lamine Zemmamouche | MC Alger | Algeria |
| 2011–12 | Mohamed Ousserir | CR Belouizdad | Algeria |
| 2012–13 | Lamine Zemmamouche | USM Alger | Algeria |
| 2013–14 | Lamine Zemmamouche | USM Alger | Algeria |
| 2014–15 | Sofiane Khedairia | ES Sétif | Algeria |
| 2015–16 | Faouzi Chaouchi | MC Alger | Algeria |
not awarded in 2016–17

=== Professional Manager of the Year ===
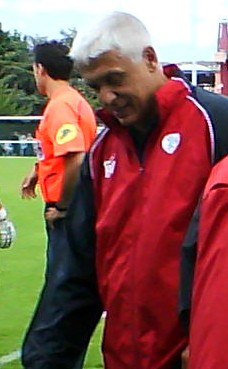
Hubert Velud the only foreigner who has won the best Manager award twice in 2013 and 2014.

| Season | Winner | Club | Country |
|---|---|---|---|
| 2007–08 | Rachid Belhout | ASO Chlef | Algeria |
| 2008–09 | Azzedine Aït Djoudi | ES Sétif | Algeria |
not awarded in 2009–10
| 2010–11 | Meziane Ighil | ASO Chlef | Algeria |
| 2011–12 | Noureddine Saâdi | ASO Chlef | Algeria |
| 2012–13 | Hubert Velud | ES Sétif | France |
| 2013–14 | Hubert Velud | USM Alger | France |
| 2014–15 | Kheïreddine Madoui | ES Sétif | Algeria |
| 2015–16 | Youcef Bouzidi | NA Hussein Dey | Algeria |
not awarded in 2016–17
