= Roberto Aballay =

Argentine footballer (born 1922)

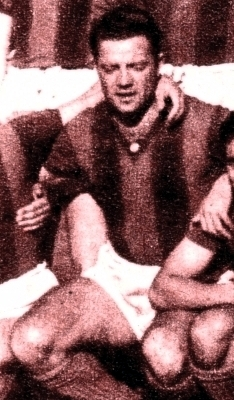

Personal information
- Full name: Roberto José Aballay
- Date of birth: 22 November 1922
- Place of birth: Buenos Aires, Argentina
- Date of death: 25 March 1983
- Place of death: Bogotá, Colombia
- Position: Forward

Senior career*
Years	Team	Apps	(Gls)
1940–1941	River Plate	2	(0)
1942	Argentinos Juniors	1	(1)
1943	Banfield	13	(8)
1944–1945	Asturias F.C.	24	(40)
1946–1948	San Lorenzo	9	(7)
1949	Genoa	29	(3)
1950–1952	FC Nancy	53	(16)
1952–1955	Metz	22	(3)
1955–1956	MC Alger	?	(?)
- * Club domestic league appearances and goals as of May 2007

Roberto José Aballay (22 November 1922 – 25 March 1983) was an Argentine football player who played as a striker.

== Career ==
Aballay started his career in 1940 with River Plate, Banfield and San Lorenzo de Almagro. He played also in Mexico for Asturias winning the championship title in the 1943-44 season, he was also the league's top goalscorer with 40 goals in 24 games. He was awarded the 1945 CONCACAF player of the year award for 1945

In Italy for Genoa in season 1949-50 (played 29 matches and scored 3 goals) and in France where closed career in 1950s with FC Nancy, Metz and MC Alger in Algeria.

== Death ==
Aballay died in Colombia during the early 1980s.
