= Michaël Fabre =

Footballer (born 1984)

Personal information
- Full name: Michaël Belkacem Fabre
- Date of birth: 15 July 1984 (age 42)
- Place of birth: Draguignan, France
- Height: 1.81 m (5 ft 11 in)
- Position: Goalkeeper

Youth career
- 1999–2000: Nantes

Senior career*
| Years | Team | Apps | (Gls) |
| 2000–2002 | Bologna | 0 | (0) |
| 2002–2003 | Fiorentina | 0 | (0) |
| 2003–2006 | Sedan | 5 | (0) |
| 2006–2013 | Clermont | 181 | (0) |
| 2011–2012 | → Lens (loan) | 23 | (0) |
| 2011–2012 | → Lens II (loan) | 2 | (0) |
| 2013–2014 | MC Alger | 0 | (0) |
| 2015 | Consolat Marseille | 13 | (0) |
| 2015–2017 | Boulogne | 51 | (0) |
| 2015 | Boulogne II | 2 | (0) |
| 2017–2018 | Étoile Fréjus Saint-Raphaël | 28 | (0) |
| Total | | 305 | (0) |

International career
| 1999–2000 | France U15 | 4 | (0) |
| 2000–2001 | France U16 | 20 | (0) |
| 2001–2002 | France U17 | 10 | (0) |
| 2002–2003 | France U18 | 12 | (0) |
| 2003–2004 | France U21 | 5 | (0) |
- * Club domestic league appearances and goals

Michaël Belkacem Fabre (born 15 July 1984) is an Algerian former professional footballer who played as a goalkeeper.

== Early life ==
Fabre was born on 15 July 1984 in Draguignan, France, to Mohamed Belkacem and Veronique Fabre, a father of Algerian origin and a French mother. His father is a native of Oran.

== International career ==
=== France ===
Fabre represented France in international competition at the junior level and was part of the France U17 national team that won the 2001 FIFA U-17 World Championship in Trinidad and Tobago. He was also a member of the French U21 that won the 2004 edition of the Toulon Tournament.

=== Algeria ===
Being of Algerian descent, Fabre was also eligible to represent Algeria and expressed his desire to do so. On 18 July 2011, newly appointed Algeria manager, Vahid Halilhodžić, called up Fabre to the Algeria national team for a five-day training camp in Marcoussis, France. On 10 August 2011, he made his unofficial debut for the team, participating in an intra-squad match by replacing Raïs M'Bolhi at halftime.
