= Yassine Boukhari =

Algerian football player (born 1986)

Personal information
- Full name: Yassine Boukhari
- Date of birth: 9 June 1986 (age 40)
- Place of birth: Berrouaghia, Algeria
- Height: 1.84 m (6 ft 0 in)
- Position: Forward

Team information
- Current team: USM Bel-Abbès

Senior career*
Years	Team	Apps	(Gls)
2005–2008	ASO Chlef	21	(7)
2008–2009	KAC Kenitra	11	(3)
2009–2010	ASO Chlef	18	(2)
2010–2011	WA Tlemcen	14	(1)
2011–	USM Bel-Abbès	2	(3)

International career^{‡}
2006–2007	Algeria U23	5	(1)
- * Club domestic league appearances and goals as of 00:00, 20 September 2011 (UTC) ‡ National team caps and goals as of 00:00, 27 April 2012 (UTC)

Yassine Boukhari (born 9 June 1986) is an Algerian football player who is currently playing for USM Bel-Abbès in the Algerian Ligue Professionnelle 2. He has been capped by Algeria at the under-23 level.
