= Karim Ghazi =

Algerian footballer (born 1979)

Personal information
- Date of birth: January 6, 1979 (age 47)
- Place of birth: Algiers, Algeria
- Height: 1.74 m (5 ft 9 in)
- Position: Defensive midfielder

Youth career
- 1993–1995: CR Belouizdad

Senior career*
| Years | Team | Apps | (Gls) |
| 1995–2004 | USM Alger | 104 | (5) |
| 2004–2005 | Espérance | 10 | (0) |
| 2005–2011 | USM Alger | 148 | (13) |
| 2011–2014 | MC Alger | 72 | (2) |
| 2014 | USM Blida | 0 | (0) |
| 2014–2017 | NA Hussein Dey | 43 | (0) |
| Total | | 367 | (20) |

International career
| 2002–2005 | Algeria | 16 | (0) |
- * Club domestic league appearances and goals

Karim Ghazi (born January 6, 1979; Arabic: كريم غازي) is an Algerian former professional footballer who played as a defensive midfielder. From 2002 to 2005, Ghazi made 16 appearances for the Algeria national team.

== Club career ==
On January 12, 2004, Ghazi joined Tunisian team Espérance de Tunis on loan until the end of the season, after an agreement between Saïd Allik and Slim Chiboub president of Esperance. After USM Alger guaranteed survival and preparation for the new season, the club leaders did not agree to renew Karim Ghazi's contract. On July 24, 2011, Ghazi signed a two-year contract with MC Alger, joining them on a free transfer from USM Alger.

== International career ==
On May 14, 2002, Ghazi made his debut for the Algeria national team, in a 0–0 draw in a friendly against Belgium.

== Career statistics ==
=== Club ===
Appearances and goals by club, season and competition
| Club | Season | League | | | Cup | | Continental | | Other | | Total | |
| Club | Season | Division | Apps | Goals | Apps | Goals | Apps | Goals | Apps | Goals | Apps | Goals |
|---|---|---|---|---|---|---|---|---|---|---|---|---|
| USM Alger | 1999–2000 | Super Division | 0 | 0 | 0 | 0 | — | | — | | 0 | 0 |
| USM Alger | 2000–01 | Super Division | 23 | 1 | 6 | 0 | — | | — | | 29 | 1 |
| USM Alger | 2001–02 | Super Division | 25 | 3 | 1 | 0 | 3 (Note: Appearance(s) in African Cup Winners' Cup) | 0 | — | | 0 | 0 |
| USM Alger | 2002–03 | Division 1 | 28 | 1 | 3 | 0 | 6 (Note: Four appearances in CAF Champions League, two appearances in African Cup Winners' Cup) | 2 | — | | 37 | 3 |
| USM Alger | 2003–04 | Division 1 | 15 | 1 | — | | 6 (Note: Appearance(s) in Champions League) | 0 | — | | 21 | 1 |
| USM Alger | 2004–05 | Division 1 | 12 | 2 | — | | 5 (Note: Four appearances in CAF Champions League, one appearance in CAF Confederation Cup) | 0 | — | | 17 | 2 |
| USM Alger | 2005–06 | Division 1 | 12 | 2 | 4 | 0 | 2 | 0 | — | | 18 | 2 |
| USM Alger | 2006–07 | Division 1 | 25 | 1 | 5 | 1 | 2 | 0 | — | | 32 | 2 |
| USM Alger | 2007–08 | Division 1 | 24 | 2 | 3 | 0 | — | | 9 (Note: Appearance(s) in Arab Champions League) | 0 | 36 | 2 |
| USM Alger | 2008–09 | Division 1 | 19 | 0 | 1 | 0 | — | | 3 | 0 | 23 | 0 |
| USM Alger | 2009–10 | Division 1 | 26 | 1 | 1 | 1 | — | | — | | 27 | 2 |
| USM Alger | 2010–11 | Ligue 1 | 29 | 2 | 1 | 0 | — | | — | | 30 | 2 |
| USM Alger | Total | | 238 | 16 | 25 | 2 | 24 | 2 | 12 | 0 | 299 | 20 |
| MC Alger | 2011–12 | Ligue 1 | 24 | 1 | 3 | 0 | — | | — | | 27 | 1 |
| MC Alger | 2012–13 | Ligue 1 | 28 | 1 | 4 | 1 | — | | — | | 32 | 2 |
| MC Alger | 2013–14 | Ligue 1 | 20 | 0 | 5 | 0 | — | | — | | 25 | 0 |
| MC Alger | Total | | 72 | 2 | 12 | 1 | — | | — | | 84 | 3 |
| NA Hussein Dey | 2014–15 | Ligue 1 | 11 | 0 | 2 | 0 | — | | — | | 13 | 0 |
| NA Hussein Dey | 2015–16 | Ligue 1 | 21 | 0 | 5 | 0 | — | | — | | 26 | 0 |
| NA Hussein Dey | 2016–17 | Ligue 1 | 11 | 0 | 1 | 0 | — | | — | | 12 | 0 |
| NA Hussein Dey | Total | | 32 | 0 | 8 | 0 | — | | — | | 51 | 0 |
| Career total | | | 342 | 18 | 45 | 3 | 24 | 2 | 12 | 0 | 423 | 23 |

=== International ===
Appearances and goals by national team and year
| National team | Year | Apps | Goals |
|---|---|---|---|
| Algeria | 2002 | 3 | 0 |
| Algeria | 2003 | 8 | 0 |
| Algeria | 2004 | 4 | 0 |
| Algeria | 2005 | 1 | 0 |
| Total | | 16 | 0 |

== Honours ==
USM Alger

- Algerian Ligue Professionnelle 1: 2001–02, 2002–03, 2004–05
- Algerian Cup: 2001, 2003

ES Tunis

- Tunisian Ligue Professionnelle 1: 2003–04

MC Alger

- Algerian Cup: 2014
