= Amine Belaïd =

Algerian footballer (born 1988)

Personal information
- Full name: Amine Belaïd
- Date of birth: April 5, 1988 (age 38)
- Position: Defender

Team information
- Current team: MC Alger
- Number: 22

Senior career*
Years	Team	Apps	(Gls)
2008–2011	USM Bel-Abbès	-	(-)
2011–	MC Alger	1	(0)
- * Club domestic league appearances and goals as of 00:00, 8 November 2011 (UTC)

Amine Belaïd (born April 5, 1988) is an Algerian football player. He plays for MC Alger in the Algerian Ligue Professionnelle 1.

== Club career ==
On July 17, 2011, Belaïd signed a two-year contract with MC Alger. On August 12, 2011, Belaïd made his MC Alger debut as a starter in a 2011 CAF Champions League group stage match against Al-Ahly. He played the entire match as MC Alger went on to lose 2–0.
