= Abou El Kacem Hadji =

Algerian footballer (born 1990)

Personal information
- Full name: Abou El Kacem Hadji
- Date of birth: August 22, 1990 (age 36)
- Place of birth: Oujda, Morocco
- Height: 1.81 m (5 ft 11 1/2 in)
- Position: Midfielder

Team information
- Current team: A Bou Saâda

Senior career*
Years	Team	Apps	(Gls)
2009–2012	WA Tlemcen	48	(1)
2012	→ MC Alger (loan)	12	(1)
2012– 2013	JSM Béjaïa	15	(0)
2013–2014	RC Arbaâ	20	(0)
2014–2015	CS Constantine	18	(2)
2015	MO Béjaïa	4	(0)
2016	USM Bel Abbès		
2016–2017	CRB Aïn Fakroun		
2018–2019	WA Tlemcen		
2020	RC Relizane		
2020–	A Bou Saâda	0	(0)
- * Club domestic league appearances and goals as of 2020

Abou El Kacem Hadji (born August 22, 1990) is an Algerian football player who plays for Algerian Ligue Professionnelle 2 club A Bou Saâda.

== Club career ==
On January 4, 2012, Hadji was loaned out by WA Tlemcen to MC Alger until the end of the season.
