= Hervé Oussalé =

Burkinabé footballer

Personal information
- Full name: Hervé Oussalé
- Date of birth: 16 June 1988 (age 38)
- Place of birth: Tyialo, Burkina Faso
- Height: 1.81 m (5 ft 11 in)
- Position: Striker

Youth career
- Les Etalons Juniors
- –2006: Etoile Filante Ouagadougou
- 2006–2008: FC Brussels
- 2008: FC Red Bull Salzburg

Senior career*
Years	Team	Apps	(Gls)
2008	Etoile Filante de Ouagadougou		
2009	Alemannia Aachen	21	(6)
2010	RAEC Mons	16	(9)
2010	Persepolis	0	(0)
2011–2012	MC Alger	14	(1)
2012	ASO Chlef	12	(4)
2013	CF Mounana	0	(0)
2014–2015	Wolfsberger AC	6	(0)
2016–2017	Tala'ea El Gaish		

International career
2005	Burkina Faso U-17		
- * Club domestic league appearances and goals as of 00:00, 14 June 2012 (UTC)

Hervé Oussalé (born 16 June 1988 in Tyialo) is a Burkinabé football player who is currently unattached.

== Career ==
Oussalé began his career with Les Etalons Juniors, then joined the juniors from Etoile Filante Ouagadougou where he played until July 2006. In July 2006, he moved to FC Brussels in Belgium where he played for the juniors for 18 months and was scouted by FC Red Bull Salzburg where he played in the reserve team. He left after six months and returned to Burkina Faso, signing a contract with Etoile Filante de Ouagadougou.

On 30 January 2009, he left Etoile Filante de Ouagadougou in the Burkinabé Premier League to join Alemannia Aachen in the 2. Bundesliga. Oussalé gave his debut on 6 February 2009 against FC Hansa Rostock. After one year, he left Alemannia Aachen and returned to Belgium, signing on for RAEC Mons on 8 January 2010.

He was invited to have a trial with Persepolis in the summer of 2010 and scored two goals in a friendly match. He joined Persepolis in July 2010.

On 6 July 2011, Oussalé signed an 18-month contract with Algerian club MC Alger. He made his debut for the club on 16 July 2011, as a starter in a 2011 CAF Champions League group stage match against Tunisian side Espérance.

== International career ==
Oussalé has played with the U-17 from Burkina Faso in the qualifications for the Coupe d’Afrique des Nations Cadets 2005 in Gambia and was promoted in 2006 to the Senior National Team.
