= Abdelhakim Laref =

Algerian footballer (born 1985)

Personal information
- Full name: Abdelhakim Laref
- Date of birth: 12 January 1985 (age 41)
- Place of birth: Relizane, Algeria
- Height: 1.88 m (6 ft 2 in)
- Position: Forward

Youth career
- Standard Liège

Senior career*
Years	Team	Apps	(Gls)
2005–2006	Roeselare	5	
2006–2008	Sint-Niklaas	70	(25)
2008–2009	La Louvière	14	(6)
2009	Sint-Niklaas	25	(-)
2009–2010	Deinze	10	(1)
2010	Eendracht Zele	11	(2)
2010–2011	JSM Béjaïa	18	(8)
2011–2012	MC Alger	30	(7)
2012–2016	Sint-Niklaas	75	(7)
2016–2017	FC Lebbeke		
2017–2019	Sint-Niklaas	43	(8)
2019	KSV Bornem		
2019–2020	Knokke	17	(3)
2020–2022	Sint-Niklaas	17	(4)

International career
	Belgium U18	0	(0)
- * Club domestic league appearances and goals

Abdelhakim Laref (born 12 January 1985) is a retired Belgian footballer of Algerian origin.

== Club career ==
Laref came up through the junior ranks of Standard Liège. He played for K.S.V. Roeselare in the Belgian First Division, as well as various other Belgian clubs, including FCN Sint-Niklaas, Germinal Beerschot, R.A.A. Louviéroise, K.F.C. Eendracht Zele, K.M.S.K. Deinze and K.A.A. Gent .

=== JSM Béjaïa ===
On 2 June 2010, Laref signed a contract with the Algerian Championnat National side JSM Béjaïa. He scored his first goal on 9 November 2010 at ORB Akbou with JSM Bejaia. On 25 January 2011, he was released from the club after making only two appearances, totaling nine minutes, without scoring any goals.
