= Hamza Zeddam =

Algerian footballer (born 1984)

Personal information
- Date of birth: 8 April 1984 (age 42)
- Place of birth: Constantine, Algeria
- Height: 1.82 m (6 ft 0 in)
- Position: Defender

Team information
- Current team: DRB Tadjenanet
- Number: 5

Senior career*
Years	Team	Apps	(Gls)
2004–2007	CS Constantine		
2007–2008	ES Sétif	9	(0)
2008–2013	MC Alger	88	(3)
2013–2015	RC Arbaâ	56	(2)
2015–2017	NA Hussein Dey	41	(0)
2017–2018	USM Blida	6	(0)
2018–	DRB Tadjenanet	2	(0)
- * Club domestic league appearances and goals as of 12 April 2018

Hamza Zeddam (born 8 April 1984) is an Algerian footballer. He currently plays for DRB Tadjenanet in the Algerian Ligue Professionnelle 1.

== Club career ==
On 16 July 2008 Zeddam signed a two-year contract with MC Alger.

On 26 November 2011 Zeddam scored MC Algiers' only goal in the Algiers derby win against city rivals USM Alger.

== Honours ==
- Won the Arab Champions League once with ES Sétif in 2007
- Won the Algerian Championnat National once with MC Alger in 2010
