= Claude Mobitang =

Cameroonian footballer

Personal information
- Full name: Claude Mobitang Eboa II
- Date of birth: October 10, 1987 (age 39)
- Position: Defender

Team information
- Current team: Namur
- Number: 20

Youth career
- –2006: Canon Yaoundé
- 2006–2007: Tours FC

Senior career*
Years	Team	Apps	(Gls)
2007–2008	US Changé		
2008–2011	Namur	29	(0)
2011–2013	MC Alger	23	(0)
2013–2015	Darnes SC		
2015–	Namur		
- * Club domestic league appearances and goals as of 29 December 2015

Claude Mobitang Eboa II (born October 10, 1987) is a Cameroonian football player. He currently plays for Namur.

== Club career ==
On July 6, 2011, Mobitang signed an 18-month contract with Algerian club MC Alger. On August 12, 2011, Mobitang made his MC Alger debut as a starter in a 2011 CAF Champions League group stage match against Al-Ahly. Mobitang played the entire match as MC Alger went on to lose 2-0.
