= Farid Daoud =

Algerian football player (born 1989)

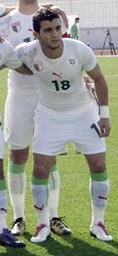

Personal information
- Full name: Farid Daoud
- Date of birth: August 25, 1989 (age 37)
- Place of birth: Tizi Ouzou, Algeria
- Position: Midfielder

Youth career
- JS Kabylie
- MC Alger

Senior career*
Years	Team	Apps	(Gls)
2007–2014	MC Alger	80	(0)
2014–2015	RC Arbaâ	45	(1)
2016	DRB Tadjenanet	13	(0)
2016–2017	CA Batna	22	(0)
2017–2018	USM El Harrach		
2018–202?	USM Annaba		

International career
2008	Algeria U20	4	(0)
2009–2011	Algeria U23	8	(0)
- * Club domestic league appearances and goals

Farid Daoud (born August 25, 1989) is an Algerian football player.

== Club career ==
Daoud began his career in the junior ranks of his hometown club of JS Kabylie. He left the club briefly to pursue his studies at the USTO before returning to continue his playing career. In 2007, he left JSK to join MC Alger.

On December 12, 2007, Daoud made his professional debut for MC Alger in a league game against WA Tlemcen. Daoud came on as a substitute in the 70th minute with the game ending 0–0.

== International career ==
On September 14, 2009, Daoud was called up by coach Abdelhak Benchikha to the Algerian Under-23 National Team for a ten-day training camp in France. In December 2010, he was a member of the Under-23 team that won the 2010 UNAF U-23 Tournament in Morocco. On November 16, 2011, he was selected as part of Algeria's squad for the 2011 CAF U-23 Championship in Morocco.

== Statistics ==
=== Statistics ===
As of 29 March 2011

Club performance			League		Cup		Continental		Total	
Season	Club	League	Apps	Goals	Apps	Goals	Apps	Goals	Apps	Goals
Algeria			League		Algerian Cup		Africa		Total	
2007–08	MC Alger	Algerian Ligue Professionnelle 1	3	0	0	0	0	0	2	0
2008–09	MC Alger	Algerian Ligue Professionnelle 1	14	0	2	0	0	0	16	0
2009–10	MC Alger	Algerian Ligue Professionnelle 1	2	0	0	0	0	0	2	0
2010–11	MC Alger	Algerian Ligue Professionnelle 1	8	0	2	0	2	0	12	0
Total	Algeria	Algerian Ligue Professionnelle 1	27	0	4	0	2	0	33	0
Career total			27	0	4	0	0	0	33	0
