= Réda Sayah =

Algerian footballer (born 1989)

Personal information
- Full name: Réda Bensaïd Sayah
- Date of birth: June 19, 1989 (age 37)
- Place of birth: Ouargla, Algeria
- Position: Forward

Team information
- Current team: MC Alger
- Number: 22

Senior career*
Years	Team	Apps	(Gls)
2010–2011	MC Mekhadma	-	(-)
2011–	MC Alger	29	(9)
- * Club domestic league appearances and goals as of 00:00, May 21, 2012 (UTC)

Réda Bensaïd Sayah (born June 19, 1989) is an Algerian football player. He currently plays for MC Alger in the Algerian Ligue Professionnelle 1.

== Club career ==
In July 2011, Sayah signed a two-year contract with MC Alger. He was originally spotted by the club when they faced his previous club, MC Mekhadma, in the second round of the 2010–11 Algerian Cup. On September 20, 2011, he made his professional debut for the club as an 87th-minute substitute in a league match against ES Sétif.
