= Amine Aksas =

Algerian football player (born 1983)

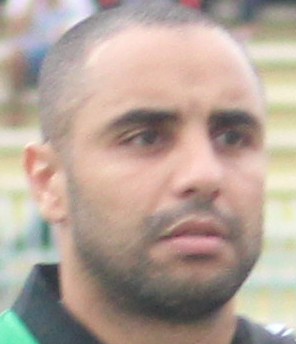
- Askas in 2019

Personal information
- Full name: Mohamed Amine Aksas
- Date of birth: 5 March 1983 (age 43)
- Place of birth: Algiers, Algeria
- Height: 1.80 m (5 ft 11 in)
- Position: Defender

Team information
- Current team: SC Aïn Defla (head coach)

Senior career*
| Years | Team | Apps | (Gls) |
| 2004–2007 | OMR El Annasser | - | (-) |
| 2007–2008 | CR Belouizdad | - | (-) |
| 2008–2010 | ES Sétif | - | (-) |
| 2010–2013 | CR Belouizdad | 56 | (3) |
| 2013–2015 | MC Alger | 44 | (5) |
| 2015–2016 | CS Constantine | 17 | (2) |
| 2016–2017 | RC Arbaâ | 0 | (0) |

International career^{‡}
| 2002 | Algeria U20 | 1 | (0) |
| 2003 | Algeria U23 | 2 | (0) |

Managerial career
- 2018–2019: OMR El Annasser
- 2019–: SC Aïn Defla
- * Club domestic league appearances and goals as of 00:00, 22 June 2015 (EST) ‡ National team caps and goals as of 00:00, 22 June 2015 (EST)

Mohamed Amine Aksas (born 5 March 1983, in Algiers) is an Algerian former football, and the current coach of SC Aïn Defla.

== Club career ==
On 18 June 2008 Aksas joined ES Sétif. In his first season with the club, he helped ES Sétif win the league title.

On 16 June 2011 Aksas, along with his CR Belouizdad teammate Ahmed Mekehout, agreed to join Saudi Arabian club Al-Qadisiyah FC on a one-year contract.

== Honours ==
- Won the Algerian Championnat National once with ES Sétif in 2009

Algerian cup with MC Alger in 2014
