= Seddik Berradja =

Algerian football player (born 1983)

Personal information
- Full name: Seddik Berradja
- Date of birth: September 20, 1983 (age 43)
- Place of birth: Oran, Algeria
- Position: Midfielder

Team information
- Current team: MC Oran
- Number: 12

Senior career*
Years	Team	Apps	(Gls)
2002–2008	MC Oran	-	(-)
2008–2010	CR Belouizdad	-	(-)
2010–2011	MC Oran	25	(8)
2011–2012	MC Alger	10	(0)
2012–	MC Oran	0	(0)
- * Club domestic league appearances and goals as of 23:25, 23 June 2012 (UTC)

Seddik Berradja (born September 9, 1983) is an Algerian football player. He currently plays for MC Oran in the Algerian Ligue Professionnelle 1.

== Honours ==
- Won the Algerian Cup once with CR Belouizdad in 2009
