= Mehdi Kacem =

Algerian footballer (born 1986)

Personal information
- Full name: Mehdi Kacem
- Date of birth: 8 August 1986 (age 40)
- Place of birth: Mantes-la-Jolie, France
- Height: 1.80 m (5 ft 11 in)
- Position: Midfielder

Team information
- Current team: USM Blida
- Number: 8

Youth career
- –2004: Amiens SC

Senior career*
Years	Team	Apps	(Gls)
2004–2007	Amiens SC	17	(0)
2007–2008	Real Murcia Imperial	-	(0)
2008–2009	FC Gueugnon	5	(0)
2009–2010	ES Sétif	17	(1)
2010– 2012	JSM Béjaïa	40	(1)
2012– 2017	MC Alger	83	(4)
2014– 2015	→ RC Arbaâ (loan)	13	(0)
2018–	USM Blida	50	(0)
Total		225	(3)

International career
2005	Algeria U20		
- * Club domestic league appearances and goals as of 00:5, 32 May 2020 (UTC)

Mehdi Kacem (born 8 August 1986), also known as Medhi Kacem, is a footballer who plays as a midfielder for USM Blida in the Algerian Ligue Professionnelle 2. Born in France, he represented Algeria at youth level.
