= Abdelkader Besseghir =

Algerian footballer (born 1978)

Personal information
- Full name: Abdelkader Besseghir
- Date of birth: May 3, 1978 (age 48)
- Place of birth: Mascara, Algeria
- Position: Defender

Senior career*
Years	Team	Apps	(Gls)
2003–2004	GC Mascara	?	(?)
2004–2008	USM Alger	47	(1)
2008	RC Kouba	-	(-)
2008–2014	MC Alger	125	(1)
2014-2015	NA Hussein Dey	9	(0)
Total		181	(2)
- * Club domestic league appearances and goals

Abdelkader Besseghir (born May 3, 1978) is an Algerian former footballer and manager. He played for MC Alger for many years as a defender (right-back). In 2014, he was hired by NA Hussein Dey. As of 2021, he was the coach for GC Mascara.
