= Abdelmalek Djeghbala =

Algerian football player (born 1983)

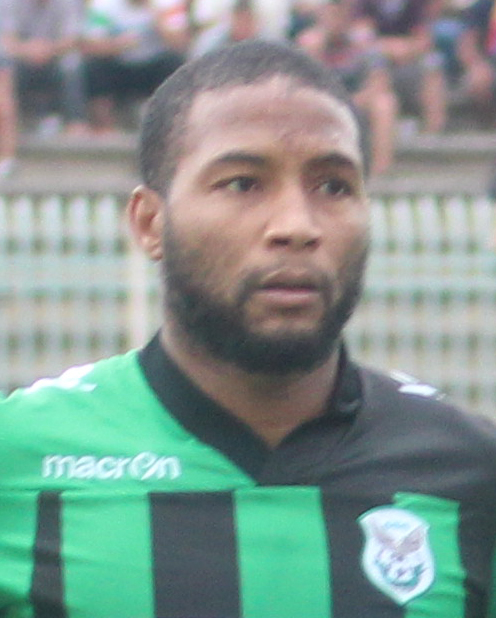

Personal information
- Full name: Abdelmalek Djeghbala
- Date of birth: March 1, 1983 (age 43)
- Place of birth: Touggourt, Algeria
- Height: 1.78 m (5 ft 10 in)
- Positions: Full back; midfielder

Team information
- Current team: RC Arbaâ

Senior career*
| Years | Team | Apps | (Gls) |
| –2008 | NRB Touggourt | - | (-) |
| 2008–2011 | USM El Harrach | 71 | (0) |
| 2011–2014 | MC Alger | 60 | (0) |
| 2014–2016 | CS Constantine | 25 | (0) |
| 2016– | RC Arbaâ | 0 | (0) |
- * Club domestic league appearances and goals as of 17 January 2016

Abdelmalek Djeghbala (born March 1, 1983) is an Algerian football player. He currently plays for RC Arbaâ in the Algerian Ligue Professionnelle 1.

== Club career ==
In 2008, Djeghbala joined USM El Harrach from NRB Touggourt. On May 1, 2011, Djeghbala started for USM El Harrach in the 2011 Algerian Cup Final against JS Kabylie. However, El Harrach lost 1–0.

== Honours ==
- Finalist of the Algerian Cup once with USM El Harrach in 2011
