= Billel Attafen =

Algerian football player (born 1985)

Personal information
- Full name: Billel Attafen
- Date of birth: July 3, 1985 (age 41)
- Place of birth: Tipaza, Algeria
- Position: Midfielder

Team information
- Current team: MC Alger
- Number: 8

Senior career*
Years	Team	Apps	(Gls)
2005–2009	NA Hussein Dey	-	(-)
2009–	MC Alger	38	(4)

International career
2007	Algeria U23	-	(-)
- * Club domestic league appearances and goals as of 00:00, 29 March 2011 (UTC)

Billel Attafen (born July 3, 1985) is an Algerian football player. He currently plays for MC Alger in the Algerian Ligue Professionnelle 1.

== Club career ==
In the summer of 2009, Attafen joined MC Alger, after spending four seasons with NA Hussein Dey.

== International career ==
On April 27, 2007, Attafen was called up by coach Abdelhafid Tasfaout to the Algerian Under-23 National Team for a training camp in Algiers to prepare for the 2007 All-Africa Games. In November, he was called up again to the team, this time for the 2007 UNAF Under-23 tournament in Tunis which Algeria won 4–2 on penalties in the final against Tunisia.
