= Redouane Bachiri =

Algerian footballer (born 1982)

Personal information
- Full name: Redouane Bachiri
- Date of birth: October 27, 1982 (age 44)
- Place of birth: Maghnia, Algeria
- Position: Defender

Senior career*
Years	Team	Apps	(Gls)
2004–2005	IRB Maghnia	-	(-)
2005–2006	USM Blida	-	(-)
2006–2007	ASM Oran	-	(-)
2007–2008	MC Oran	-	(-)
2008–2011	WA Tlemcen	-	(-)
2011–2012	JSM Béjaïa	24	(4)
2012–2016	MC Alger	75	(2)
2016–2017	USM Bel-Abbès	21	(0)
2017	Olympique Médéa	1	(0)
- * Club domestic league appearances and goals as of 6 March 2018

Redouane Bachiri (born October 27, 1982, in Maghnia) is an Algerian football player. He most recently played for Olympique Médéa.
