= Houari Djemili =

Algerian footballer (born 1987)

Personal information
- Date of birth: 15 May 1987 (age 39)
- Place of birth: Oran, Algeria
- Position: Goalkeeper

Team information
- Current team: RC Kouba
- Number: 16

Senior career*
Years	Team	Apps	(Gls)
2009–2012	WA Tlemcen	55	(0)
2012–2015	MC Alger	38	(0)
2015–2018	JS Saoura	42	(0)
2019–	RC Kouba		
- * Club domestic league appearances and goals as of 15 January 2019

Houari Djemili (born 15 May 1987) is an Algerian footballer as a goalkeeper for RC Kouba in the Algerian Ligue Professionnelle 2.
