= Ali Sami Yachir =

Algerian footballer (born 1985)

Personal information
- Full name: Ali Sami Yachir
- Date of birth: January 2, 1985 (age 41)
- Place of birth: Tizi Ouzou, Algeria
- Height: 1.80 m (5 ft 11 in)
- Position: Forward

Team information
- Current team: ASO Chlef

Youth career
- 1998–2000: Caen
- 2000–2004: Montpellier

Senior career*
Years	Team	Apps	(Gls)
2004–2006	Montpellier	51	(0)
2006–2008	Strasbourg	3	(0)
2007–2008	→ Reims (loan)	1	(0)
2010–2012	USM El Harrach	31	(5)
2012–2015	MC Alger	74	(9)
2015–	ASO Chlef	0	(0)
- * Club domestic league appearances and goals as of 00:00, July 13, 2015 (EST)

Ali Sami Yachir (born January 2, 1985) is an Algerian football player who plays for ASO Chlef in the Algerian Ligue Professionnelle 2.

== Early life ==
Yachir was born in Tizi Ouzou, Algeria. His father Djafar was born in Ouadhia and his mother Zahia in Hussein-Dey, French Algeria.

The family settled in France, in the Seine-Maritime department, around 1990. Yachir acquired French nationality on 14 May 1996, through the collective effect connected to the reinstatement of his parents in French nationality.

== Club career ==
In September 2013, a video of a miss by Yachir in a league match against CR Belouizdad went viral. The striker failed to score into an empty net after the goalkeeper had tripped over the ball.

== Honours ==
MC Alger

- Algerian Cup: 2014
- Algerian Super Cup: 2014
