= Nabil Yaâlaoui =

Algerian footballer (born 1987)

Personal information
- Full name: Nabil Yaâlaoui
- Date of birth: May 1, 1987 (age 39)
- Place of birth: Maghnia, Algeria
- Position: Midfielder

Team information
- Current team: USM Annaba

Senior career*
Years	Team	Apps	(Gls)
2006–2007	IRB Maghnia	-	(-)
2007–2010	WA Tlemcen	-	(-)
2010–2011	JS Kabylie	20	(3)
2011–2014	MC Alger	51	(5)
2014	WA Tlemcen	7	(0)
2014–2015	CRB Aïn Fakroun	-	(-)
2015–2015	RC Relizane	-	(-)
2016	MC Oran	-	(-)
2016–2018	CA Bordj Bou Arreridj	-	(-)
2018–2019	A Bou Saâda	-	(-)
2019–	USM Annaba	-	(-)
- * Club domestic league appearances and goals as of 18 July 2019 (UTC)

Nabil Yaâlaoui (born May 1, 1987) is an Algerian footballer who is currently playing for USM Annaba in the Algerian Ligue Professionnelle 2.

== Club career ==
=== JS Kabylie ===
On June 6, 2010, Yaâlaoui signed a one-year contract with JS Kabylie. On September 19, 2010, Yaâlaoui scored a goal against Nigerian club Heartland in the group stage of the 2010 CAF Champions League. A week later, in his first league game for the club, on September 25, 2010, he scored a goal in a 3–2 win over AS Khroub.

=== MC Alger ===
On July 28, 2011, Yaâlaoui signed a one-year contract with MC Alger.

== Honours ==
- Won the Algerian Championnat National 2 once with WA Tlemcen in 2009
- Won the Algerian Cup once with JS Kabylie in 2011
