= Moustapha Djallit =

Algerian footballer (born 1983)

Personal information
- Date of birth: September 21, 1983 (age 43)
- Place of birth: Béchar, Algeria
- Height: 1.76 m (5 ft 9 1/2 in)
- Position: Striker

Senior career*
Years	Team	Apps	(Gls)
2003–2006	IR Mecheria		
2006–2010	WA Tlemcen	108	(28)
2010–2011	ES Sétif	19	(4)
2011–2012	JSM Béjaïa	13	(1)
2012–2015	MC Alger	87	(31)
2015–2019	JS Saoura	39	(13)

International career
2010–?	Algeria A'	12	(1)
2012	Algeria	1	(0)

Managerial career
- 2019: JS Saoura
- 2019–2021: JS Saoura (assistant)
- 2021: JS Saoura
- * Club domestic league appearances and goals

Moustapha Djallit (Arabic: مصطفى جليط; born September 21, 1983, in Béchar) is an Algerian former footballer.

== Club career ==
He previously played for IR Mecheria before joining WA Tlemcen.

On January 4, 2012, Djallit joined MC Alger on a free transfer from JSM Béjaïa. On March 6, Djallit scored his first goals for MC Alger, netting a brace against ASO Chlef. However, MC Alger lost the game 4–2. He repeated the performance the following game with another two goals against MC Saïda, with MC Alger winning 2–0 this time. He finished his first season with MC Alger with 9 goals in 14 games.

Djallit started the 2012–13 season with a first half hat-trick against WA Tlemcen as MC Alger went on to win 3–0. He followed up that performance with an injury time winner against JS Saoura in the next game.

== International career ==
On March 3, 2010, Djallit made his debut for the Algeria A' National Team in a 4–0 friendly win against Liechtenstein.

== Honours ==
- Won the Algerian Second Division once with WA Tlemcen in 2009
- Won the North African Super Cup once with ES Sétif in 2010
- Won the North African Cup Winners Cup once with ES Sétif in 2010
