= 2014–15 CR Belouizdad season =

CR Belouizdad
2014–15 season
- Chairman: Réda Malek
- Head coach: Alain Michel (from 29 October 2014)
- Stadium: Stade 20 Août 1955
- Ligue 1: 6th
- Algerian Cup: Round of 32
- Top goalscorer: League: Aboubaker Rebih (4); Adel Bougueroua (4); All: Adel Bougueroua (6)

In the 2014–15 season, CR Belouizdad competed in the Ligue 1 for the 49th season, as well as the Algerian Cup.

== Squad list ==
Players and squad numbers last updated on 18 November 2014.
Note: Flags indicate national team as has been defined under FIFA eligibility rules. Players may hold more than one non-FIFA nationality.

No.	Nat.	Position	Name	Date of Birth (Age)	Signed from
Goalkeepers
1	(Algeria)	GK	Malik Asselah	8 July 1986 (aged 27)	(Algeria) JS Kabylie
38	(Algeria)	GK	Khaled Boukacem	24 April 1985 (aged 28)	(Algeria) USMM Hadjout
45	(Algeria)	GK	Mohamed Ramzy Abassi	22 June 1992 (aged 21)	(Algeria) Youth system
Defenders
3	(Algeria)		Zakaria Bencherifa	8 September 1991 (aged 22)	(Algeria) Youth system
27	(Algeria)		Abdellah Chebira	12 July 1986 (aged 27)	(Algeria) CA Bordj Bou Arréridj
20	(Algeria)		Sofiane Khelili	9 December 1989 (aged 24)	(Algeria) JS Kabylie
	(Algeria)		Khalid Kolli	25 April 1984 (aged 29)	(Algeria) ?
22	(Algeria)		Abdelkrim Nemdil	3 October 1989 (aged 24)	(Algeria) RC Arbaâ
	(Algeria)		Zakaria Boufriche		(Algeria) Youth system
19	(Algeria)		Tarek Cheurfaoui	28 June 1986 (aged 27)	(Algeria) RC Arbaâ
23	(Algeria)		Hakim Khoudi	16 July 1989 (aged 24)	(Algeria) Youth system
83	(Algeria)		Ilyes Sidhoum	10 August 1989 (aged 24)	(Algeria) WA Tlemcen
	(Algeria)		Fetheddine Mechti	18 August 1992 (aged 21)	(Algeria) ?
Midfielders
17	(Algeria)		Ali Amiri	23 October 1987 (aged 26)	(Algeria) RC Arbaâ
10	(Algeria)		Lamouri Djediat	20 December 1982 (aged 31)	(Algeria) USM Alger
6	(Cameroon)		Gilles Ngomo	23 August 1987 (aged 26)	(Algeria) CS Constantine
	(Algeria)		Bilal Tarikat	12 June 1991 (aged 22)	(Algeria) ?
7	(Algeria)		Abousoufiane Balegh	17 August 1988 (aged 25)	(Algeria) ?
31	(Algeria)		Zakaria Draoui		(Algeria) Youth system
	(Algeria)		Ahmed Tafat	7 May 1991 (aged 22)	(Algeria) Youth system
Forwards
11	(Algeria)		Adel Bougueroua	14 June 1987 (aged 26)	(Algeria) RC Arbaâ
99	(Serbia) (Bosnia and Herzegovina)		Miloš Galin	22 April 1990 (aged 23)	(Greece) Kalamata
18	(Algeria)		Aboubaker Rebih	18 December 1983 (aged 30)	(Algeria) USM Annaba
8	(Algeria)		Mohamed Derrag	3 April 1985 (aged 28)	(Algeria) RC Arbaâ
	(Algeria)		Ali Sellami	11 January 1991 (aged 22)	(Algeria) ?
	(Algeria)		Zakaria Khaldi		(Algeria) Youth system
4	(Algeria)		Ahmed Toumi		(Algeria) Youth system

== Competitions ==
=== Overview ===
Competition	Record								Started round	Final position / round	First match	Last match
Competition	G	W	D	L	GF	GA	GD	Win %	Started round	Final position / round	First match	Last match
Ligue 1	30	11	9	10	27	34	−7	36.67	—N/a	6th	16 August 2014	29 May 2015
Algerian Cup	2	1	1	0	3	2	+1	50.00	Round of 64	Round of 32	13 December 2014	26 December 2014
Total	32	12	10	10	30	36	−6	37.50				

=== Ligue 1 ===
The Ligue 1 2014-2015 is the fifty-first edition of Algerian Ligue Professionnelle 1 and the fifth under the name Ligue 1. Division opposes sixteen clubs in a series of thirty meetings. The best in the league qualify for the African cups that are the Champions League (the podium) and Confederation Cup (the third and the winner national cup).

The relegated the previous season, JSM Bejaia on CA Bordj Bou Arreridj and CRB Ain Fakroun are replaced by USM Bel-Abbès, Ligue 2 in 2013-2014 after a year's absence, the ASM Oran, 7 years after his last appearance at the highest national level, and NA Hussein Dey relegated to Ligue 2 during the 2010–2011 season.

==== League table ====
Pos	Team	Pld	W	D	L	GF	GA	GD	Pts	Qualification or relegation
4	USM El Harrach	30	13	4	13	30	32	−2	43	
5	CS Constantine	30	11	9	10	32	31	+1	42 (Note: CSC 3-1 CRB; CRB 1-1 CSC)	2016 CAF Confederation Cup
6	CR Belouizdad	30	11	9	10	27	34	−7	42	
7	ASM Oran	30	11	8	11	33	37	−4	41 (Note: USMA 1-2 ASMO; ASMO 1-0 USMA)	
8	USM Alger	30	10	11	9	35	27	+8	41	

Updated to match(es) played on 29 May 2015. Source: DZFoot
Rules for classification: 1) points; 2) head-to-head points; 3) head-to-head goal difference; 4) goal difference; 5) total goals; 6) fairplay ranking; 7) playoff

==== Results summary ====
Overall								Home						Away					
Pld	W	D	L	GF	GA	GD	Pts	W	D	L	GF	GA	GD	W	D	L	GF	GA	GD
30	11	9	10	27	34	−7	42	8	6	1	18	11	+7	3	3	9	9	23	−14

Last updated: 29 December 2014.
Source: Competitive matches

==== Results by round ====
Round	1	2	3	4	5	6	7	8	9	10	11	12	13	14	15	16	17	18	19	20	21	22	23	24	25	26	27	28	29	30
Ground	A	H	A	H	A	H	A	H	A	H	A	H	A	A	H	H	A	H	A	H	A	H	A	H	A	H	A	H	H	A
Result	L	W	L	D	L	W	L	L	W	W	D	W	L	L	W	D	D	W	W	W	L	D	D	D	L	W	W	D	D	L
Position	14	10	13	12	15	13	15	15	14	11	11	9	10	13	11	11	10	9	6	4	6	8	6	7	8	5	5	3	3	6

Updated to match(es) played on 29 December 2014. Source: Competitive matches
A = Away; H = Home; W = Win; D = Draw; L = Loss

==== Matches ====
16 August 2014 1	CS Constantine	3–1	CR Belouizdad	Constantine
19:00	Boulemdaïs 28', 55'; Sameur 44'	Report	66' Cherfaoui	Stadium: Stade Mohamed Hamlaoui; Referee: Mohamed Benouza

22 August 2014 2	CR Belouizdad	1–0	MC Oran	Algiers
17:45	Djediat 45'	Report		Stadium: Stade 20 Août 1955; Referee: Redouane Necib

13 September 2014 3	USM Alger	2–0	CR Belouizdad	Algiers
17:45	Meftah 50' (pen.); Nadji 75'; Koudri (yellow card) 57'; Boudebouda (yellow card) 66'; Khoualed (yellow card) 87'	Report	(yellow card) 25' Djediat; (yellow card) 45' Sidhoum; (yellow card) 47' Cheurfaoui	Stadium: Stade Omar Hammadi; Referee: Abderrezzak Arab

20 September 2014 4	CR Belouizdad	1–1	USM Bel-Abbès	Algiers
19:00	Obélé 14'	Report	62' Niati	Stadium: Stade 20 Août 1955; Referee: Farouk Mial

27 September 2014 5	MC El Eulma	4–1	CR Belouizdad	El Eulma
18:00	Hamiti 10' (pen.); Derrardja 54', 89'; Abbès 80'	Report	45' (pen.) Bougueroua	Stadium: Stade Messaoud Zougar; Attendance: 0 (close doors); Referee: Mohamed Boukhalfa

2 October 2014 6	CR Belouizdad	3–2	ASO Chlef	Algiers
16:00	Rebih 37', 66'; Bougueroua 45+1'	Report	56' Lakhdari; 89' Tedjar	Stadium: Stade 20 Août 1955; Referee: Mohamed Bachir

17 October 2014 7	NA Hussein Dey	1–0	CR Belouizdad	Algiers
18:00	Ouznadji 77'	Report		Stadium: Stade Omar Hammadi; Referee: Farouk Houasnia

25 October 2014 8	CR Belouizdad	0–2	MO Béjaïa	Algiers
16:00		Report	4' Hamzaoui; 90' (o.g.) Cheurfaoui	Stadium: Stade 20 Août 1955; Referee: Mohamed Saïdi

1 November 2014 9	JS Saoura	2–1	CR Belouizdad	Béchar
15:00	Sebie 67' (pen.)	Report	70' Djediat; 90+1' Rebih	Stadium: Stade 20 Août 1955; Referee: Said Aouina

8 November 2014 10	CR Belouizdad	2–0	MC Alger	Algiers
18:00	Khellili 17'; Rebih 74'	Report		Stadium: Stade 20 Août 1955; Referee: Mohamed Bichari

22 November 2014 11	ASM Oran	0–0	CR Belouizdad	Oran
18:00		Report		Stadium: Stade Ahmed Zabana; Referee: Redouane Necib

29 November 2014 12	CR Belouizdad	2–1	JS Kabylie	Algiers
16:00	Bougueroua 27', 67'	Report	71' Rial	Stadium: Stade 20 Août 1955; Referee: Boubekeur Zouaoui

6 December 2014 13	ES Sétif	1–0	CR Belouizdad	Sétif
17:45	Benyettou 86' (pen.)	Report		Stadium: Stade 8 Mai 1945; Referee: Lahlou Benbraham

20 December 2014 14	RC Arbaâ	2–0	CR Belouizdad	Larbaâ
14:30	Yettou 11'; Darfalou 48'	Report		Stadium: Stade Ismaïl Makhlouf; Referee: Mohamed Ghorbal

30 December 2014 15	CR Belouizdad	1–0	USM El Harrach	Algiers
16:00	Balegh 67'	Report		Stadium: Stade 20 Août 1955; Referee: Mohamed Bichari

20 January 2015 16	CR Belouizdad	1–1	CS Constantine	Algiers
17:00	Chebira 55'	Report	17' Sameur	Stadium: Stade 20 Août 1955; Referee: Mohamed Saïdi

24 January 2015 17	MC Oran	0–0	CR Belouizdad	Oran
16:00		Report		Stadium: Stade Ahmed Zabana; Referee: Redouane Necib

30 January 2015 18	CR Belouizdad	2–1	USM Alger	Algiers
16:00	Cheurfaoui 21'; Djediat 67'; Derrag (yellow card) 15'; Chebira (yellow card) 37' (yellow-red card) 56'; Nemdil (yellow card) 52'	Report	87' Belaïli; (yellow card) 22' Boudebouda; (yellow card) 70' Bouchema; (yellow card) 74' Berrefane; (yellow card) 77' Ferhat	Stadium: Stade 20 Août 1955

7 February 2015 19	USM Bel Abbès	0–1	CR Belouizdad	Sidi Bel Abbès
16:00		Report	2' Galin	Stadium: Stade 24 Fevrier 1956; Referee: Farouk Mial

10 February 2015 20	CR Belouizdad	1–0	MC El Eulma	Algiers
16:00	Draoui 37'	Report		Stadium: Stade 20 Août 1955; Referee: Mohamed Benouza

28 February 2015 21	ASO Chlef	2–0	CR Belouizdad	Chlef
16:00	Semahi 21', 51'	Report		Stadium: Stade Mohamed Boumezrag; Referee: Hakim Bouchama

6 March 2015 22	CR Belouizdad	0–0	NA Hussein Dey	Algiers
16:00		Report		Stadium: Stade 20 Août 1955; Referee: Mohamed Bichari

21 March 2015 23	MO Béjaïa	2–2	CR Belouizdad	Béjaïa
16:00	Rahal 3' (pen.); Zerdab 38'	Report	43' Cheurfaoui; 78' Derrag	Stadium: Stade de l'Unité Maghrébine; Referee: Redouane Necib

28 March 2015 24	CR Belouizdad	1–1	JS Saoura	Algiers
16:00	Rebih 45'	Report	54' Aoudou	Stadium: Stade 20 Août 1955; Referee: Farouk Mial

17 April 2015 25	MC Alger	3–0	CR Belouizdad	Algiers
16:00	Gourmi 60'; Bachiri 72'; Aouedj 76'	Report		Stadium: Stade Omar Hammadi; Attendance: 0 (close doors); Referee: Mohamed Boukhalfa

25 April 2015 26	CR Belouizdad	2–1	ASM Oran	Algiers
17:00	Amiri 23'; Ngomo 90'	Report	40' (pen.) Herbache	Stadium: Stade 20 Août 1955; Referee: Said Aouina

9 May 2015 27	JS Kabylie	0–1	CR Belouizdad	Tizi Ouzou
17:00		Report	44' Khelili	Stadium: Stade du 1er Novembre 1954; Referee: Mohamed Bichari

16 May 2015 28	CR Belouizdad	0–0	ES Sétif	Algiers
17:00		Report		Stadium: Stade 20 Août 1955; Attendance: 0 (close doors); Referee: Lahlou Benbraham

23 May 2015 29	CR Belouizdad	1–1	RC Arbaâ	Algiers
17:00	Draoui 73'	Report	90' Darfalou	Stadium: Stade 20 Août 1955; Referee: Mokhtar Amalou

29 May 2015 30	USM El Harrach	2–1	CR Belouizdad	Algiers
17:00	Kenniche 42'; Bouguèche 45'	Report	90' Toumi	Stadium: Stade 1er Novembre 1954; Referee: Redouane Necib

== Algerian Cup ==
15 December 2014 Round of 64	USM Blida	1–2	CR Belouizdad	Chlef
16:00	Badarane 83' (pen.)		Bougueroua 60' (pen.), 79'	Stadium: Stade Mohamed Boumezrag; Referee: Bouhassoun, Bounoua, Rachedi

26 December 2014 Round of 32	DRB Tadjenanet	1–1 (a.e.t.) (7–6 p)	CR Belouizdad	Tadjenanet
14:30	Boutebba 42'		Khelili 90+2'	Stadium: Lahoua Smaïl Stadium; Referee: Saïdi, Lebchirene, Rezguene

== Squad information ==
=== Playing statistics ===
No.	Pos	Nat	Player	Total		Ligue 1		Algerian Cup	
No.	Pos	Nat	Player	Apps	Goals	Apps	Goals	Apps	Goals
Goalkeepers
1	GK	(Algeria) ALG	Malik Asselah	27	0	25	0	2	0
38	GK	(Algeria) ALG	Khaled Boukacem	5	0	5	0	0	0
45	GK	(Algeria) ALG	Mohamed Ramzy Abassi	0	0	0	0	0	0
Defenders
3	DF	(Algeria) ALG	Zakaria Bencherifa	20	0	20	0	0	0
27	DF	(Algeria) ALG	Abdellah Chebira	19	1	17	1	2	0
20	DF	(Algeria) ALG	Sofiane Khelili	27	4	25	3	2	1
	DF	(Algeria) ALG	Khalid Kolli	0	0	0	0	0	0
22	DF	(Algeria) ALG	Abdelkrim Nemdil	27	0	25	0	2	0
	DF	(Algeria) ALG	Zakaria Boufriche	0	0	0	0	0	0
19	DF	(Algeria) ALG	Tarek Cheurfaoui	26	3	25	3	1	0
23	DF	(Algeria) ALG	Hakim Khoudi	18	0	17	0	1	0
	DF	(Algeria) ALG	Fetheddine Mechti	0	0	0	0	0	0
Midfielders
83	DF	(Algeria) ALG	Ilyes Sidhoum	15	0	13	0	2	0
17	MF	(Algeria) ALG	Ali Amiri	27	1	25	1	2	0
10	MF	(Algeria) ALG	Lamouri Djediat	21	3	19	3	2	0
6	MF	(Cameroon) CMR	Gilles Ngomo	29	1	27	1	2	0
	MF	(Algeria) ALG	Bilal Tarikat	18	0	16	0	2	0
7	MF	(Algeria) ALG	Abou Sofiane Balegh	19	1	18	1	1	0
31	MF	(Algeria) ALG	Zakaria Draoui	28	2	26	2	2	0
	MF	(Algeria) ALG	Ahmed Tafat	2	0	2	0	0	0
Forwards
11	FW	(Algeria) ALG	Adel Bougueroua	32	6	30	4	2	2
99	FW	(Bosnia and Herzegovina) BIH	Miloš Galin	6	1	6	1	0	0
18	FW	(Algeria) ALG	Aboubaker Rebih	28	4	26	4	2	0
8	FW	(Algeria) ALG	Mohamed Derrag	15	1	15	1	0	0
	FW	(Algeria) ALG	Ali Sellami	6	0	6	0	0	0
	FW	(Algeria) ALG	Zakaria Khaldi	0	0	0	0	0	0
	FW	(Cameroon) CMR	François Obele Mvondo	8	1	8	1	0	0
4	FW	(Algeria) ALG	Ahmed Toumi	2	1	2	1	0	0
Players transferred out during the season

Last updated: 9 October 2017
Source: fr.soccerway.com

=== Goalscorers ===
Includes all competitive matches. The list is sorted alphabetically by surname when total goals are equal.

No.	Nat.	Player	Pos.	Ligue 1	Cup	TOTAL
11	(Algeria)	Adel Bougueroua	FW	4	2	6
18	(Algeria)	Aboubaker Rebih	FW	4	0	4
20	(Algeria)	Sofiane Khelili	DF	3	1	4
19	(Algeria)	Tarek Cheurfaoui	DF	3	0	3
10	(Algeria)	Lamouri Djediat	MF	3	0	3
-	(Algeria)	Zakaria Draoui	MF	2	0	2
17	(Algeria)	Ali Amiri	MF	1	0	1
7	(Algeria)	Abousoufiane Balegh	MF	1	0	1
27	(Algeria)	Abdellah Chebira	DF	1	0	1
99	(Bosnia and Herzegovina)	Miloš Galin	FW	1	0	1
6	(Cameroon)	Gilles Ngomo	MF	1	0	1
-	(Cameroon)	François Obele Mvondo	FW	1	0	1
4	(Algeria)	Ahmed Toumi	FW	1	0	1
Own Goals				1	0	1
Totals				27	3	30

== Transfers ==
=== In ===
Date	Pos	Player	From club	Transfer fee	Source
4 June 2014	GK	(Algeria) Malik Asselah	JS Kabylie	Undisclosed	
4 June 2014	MF	(Algeria) Ilyes Sidhoum	WA Tlemcen	Undisclosed	
4 June 2014	FW	(Algeria) Adel Bougueroua	RC Arbaâ	Undisclosed	
1 July 2014	GK	(Algeria) Khaled Boukacem	USMM Hadjout	Undisclosed	
1 July 2014	DF	(Algeria) Tarek Cheurfaoui	RC Arbaâ	Undisclosed	
1 July 2014	DF	(Algeria) Abdellah Chebira	CA Bordj Bou Arréridj	Undisclosed	
1 July 2014	DF	(Algeria) Abdelkrim Nemdil	RC Arbaâ	Undisclosed	
1 July 2014	MF	(Cameroon) Gilles Ngomo	CS Constantine	Free transfer	
1 July 2014	MF	(Algeria) Ali Amiri	RC Arbaâ	Undisclosed	
30 July 2014	MF	(Algeria) Lamouri Djediat	USM Alger	Free transfer	
14 January 2015	FW	(Bosnia and Herzegovina) Miloš Galin	(Bosnia and Herzegovina) FK Sloboda Tuzla	Free transfer	
17 January 2015	FW	(Algeria) Mohamed Derrag	RC Arbaâ	Undisclosed	
