= 2016–17 CR Belouizdad season =

CR Belouizdad
2016–17 season
- Chairman: Réda Malek (until 24 December 2016); Mohamed Bouhafs (from 24 December 2016)
- Head coach: Fouad Bouali (until 28 August 2016); Alain Michel (from 19 September 2016) (until 22 October 2016); Badou Zaki (from 5 November 2016)
- Stadium: Stade 20 Août 1955
- Ligue 1: 6th
- Algerian Cup: Winners
- Top goalscorer: League: Mohamed Amine Hamia (7); All: Mohamed Amine Hamia (8)

In the 2016–17 season, CR Belouizdad competed in the Ligue 1 for the 51st season, as well as the Algerian Cup.

== Squad list ==
Players and squad numbers last updated on 18 November 2018.
Note: Flags indicate national team as has been defined under FIFA eligibility rules. Players may hold more than one non-FIFA nationality.

No.	Nat.	Position	Name	Date of birth (age)	Signed from
Goalkeepers
Defenders
Midfielders
Forwards

== Competitions ==
=== Overview ===
Competition	Record								Started round	Final position / round	First match	Last match
Competition	G	W	D	L	GF	GA	GD	Win %	Started round	Final position / round	First match	Last match
Ligue 1	30	12	7	11	30	25	+5	40.00	—N/a	6th	20 August 2016	14 June 2017
Algerian Cup	6	4	2	0	7	3	+4	66.67	Round of 64	Winners	25 November 2016	5 July 2017
Total	36	16	9	11	37	28	+9	44.44				

=== Ligue 1 ===
==== League table ====
Pos	Team	Pld	W	D	L	GF	GA	GD	Pts	Qualification or relegation
4	USM Bel-Abbès	30	14	6	10	37	33	+4	48	
5	JS Saoura	30	12	9	9	34	30	+4	45	
6	CR Belouizdad	30	12	7	11	30	25	+5	43	Qualification for the 2018 CAF Confederation Cup
7	MC Oran	30	9	13	8	24	25	−1	40 (Note: MC Oran ahead of NA Hussein Dey on head-to-head record: MCO–NAH 1–0, NAH–MCO 1–0 however goal difference in the first leg MCO (+7) NAH (+2).)	
8	NA Hussein Dey	30	11	7	12	38	37	+1	40	Qualification for 2017 Arab Club Championship

Updated to match(es) played on 14 June 2017. Source: DZFoot
Rules for classification: 1) points; 2) head-to-head points; 3) head-to-head goal difference; 4) goal difference; 5) total goals; 6) fairplay ranking; 7) playoff.

==== Results summary ====
Overall								Home						Away					
Pld	W	D	L	GF	GA	GD	Pts	W	D	L	GF	GA	GD	W	D	L	GF	GA	GD
30	12	7	11	30	25	+5	43	9	3	3	18	9	+9	3	4	8	12	16	−4

Last updated: 30 January 2016.
Source: Competitive matches

==== Results by round ====
Round	1	2	3	4	5	6	7	8	9	10	11	12	13	14	15	16	17	18	19	20	21	22	23	24	25	26	27	28	29	30
Ground																														
Result	D	L	W	L	L	W	L	L	L	D	D	W	D	W	L	W	W	D	W	L	W	L	D	W	L	W	L	W	W	D
Position	7	11	8	10	13	10	12	13	13	14	14	14	13	11	11	9	9	10	8	9	9	9	9	8	9	9	9	6	6	6

Updated to match(es) played on 30 January 2016. Source: Competitive matches
A = Away; H = Home; W = Win; D = Draw; L = Loss

=== Matches ===
Win Draw Loss

20 August 2016 Round 1	CR Belouizdad	1–1	MC Oran	Belouizdad
19:00	Rebih 4'	Soccerway report Live TV: None	32' Nessakh	Stadium: Stade du 20 Août 1955; Referee: Redouane Necib

27 August 2016 Round 2	ES Sétif	2–1	CR Belouizdad	Sétif
19:00	Bakir 34'; Nadji 59'	Report; Live TV: None	70' Naamani	Stadium: Stade 8 Mai 1945; Attendance: 0 (close doors); Referee: Mehdi Abid Charef

8 September 2016 Round 3	CR Belouizdad	1–0	JS Saoura	Belouizdad
19:00	Aoudou 85'	Report; Live TV: None		Stadium: Stade du 20 Août 1955; Referee: Abderrezzak Arab

8 October 2016 Round 4	MO Béjaïa	1–0	CR Belouizdad	Béjaïa
17:00	Betorangal 17'	Report; Live TV: Algérie 3		Stadium: Stade de l'Unité Maghrébine; Referee: Said Aouina

24 September 2016 Round 5	CR Belouizdad	0–1	USM Alger	Algiers
17:45		Report; Live TV: Algérie 3	12' Meziane	Stadium: Stade du 5 Juillet; Referee: Lotfi Bekouassa

30 September 2016 Round 6	DRB Tadjenanet	1–2	CR Belouizdad	Tadjenanet
16:00	Nazouani 73'	Report; Live TV: EPTV Terrestre / Canal Algérie	36' Rebih; 65' Bouchema	Stadium: Lahoua Smaïl Stadium; Referee: Mustapha Bessiri

14 October 2016 Round 7	CR Belouizdad	1–2	CS Constantine	Belouizdad
16:00	Draoui 26'	Report; Live TV: Algérie 3 / TV Tamazight 4	53' Meghni; 90+6' Zerara	Stadium: Stade du 20 Août 1955; Referee: Redouane Necib

21 October 2016 Round 8	CR Belouizdad	0–1	USM Bel-Abbès	Belouizdad
16:00		Report; Live TV: Algérie 3 / TV Tamazight 4	87' Tabti	Stadium: Stade du 20 Août 1955; Referee: Ahmed Bouzrar

28 October 2016 Round 9	RC Relizane	1–0	CR Belouizdad	Relizane
16:00	Tebbi 45'	Report; Live TV: EPTV Terrestre / TV Tamazight 4		Stadium: Stade Tahar Zoughari; Referee: Boubekeur Zouaoui

5 November 2016 Round 10	CR Belouizdad	1–1	Olympique de Médéa	Belouizdad
16:00	Yahia-Chérif 42'	Report; Live TV: None	5' Lamhene	Stadium: Stade du 20 Août 1955; Referee: Mohamed Benouza

11 November 2016 Round 11	NA Hussein Dey	1–1	CR Belouizdad	Algiers
16:00	Ardji 58'	Report; Live TV: EPTV Terrestre / Canal Algérie	69' Bougueroua	Stadium: Stade du 5 Juillet; Referee: Merzak Halalchi

19 November 2016 Round 12	CR Belouizdad	1–0	MC Alger	Algiers
16:00	Lakroum 42'	Report; Live TV: Algérie 3		Stadium: Stade du 5 Juillet; Referee: Mustapha Ghorbal

2 December 2016 Round 13	USM El Harrach	1–1	CR Belouizdad	Algiers
16:00	Dahar 24'	Report; Live TV: Algérie 3	28' Lakroum	Stadium: Stade du 5 Juillet; Referee: Lotfi Bekouassa

9 December 2016 Round 14	CR Belouizdad	1–0	CA Batna	Belouizdad
16:00	Draoui 77'	Report; Live TV: None		Stadium: Stade du 20 Août 1955; Attendance: 0 (close doors); Referee: Mohamed Benouza

24 December 2016 Round 15	JS Kabylie	1–0	CR Belouizdad	Tizi Ouzou
16:00	Boulaouidet 43'	Report; Live TV: Algérie 3		Stadium: November 1, 1954 Stadium; Referee: Ahmed Bouzrar

14 February 2017 Round 16	MC Oran	0–2	CR Belouizdad	Oran
16:00; Match rescheduled due to share some of their players in the African Cup and World Cup military		Report; Live TV: Canal Algérie	13', 79' Hamia	Stadium: Ahmed Zabana Stadium; Referee: Farouk Mial

25 March 2017 Round 17	CR Belouizdad	1–0	ES Sétif	Belouizdad
15:00; Match rescheduled due to share some of their players in the African Cup and World Cup military	Hamia 88' (pen.)	Report; Live TV: None		Stadium: Stade du 20 Août 1955; Referee: Mustapha Ghorbal

2 February 2017 Round 18	JS Saoura	1–1	CR Belouizdad	Béchar
18:00	Djallit 5'	Report; Live TV: None	30' (o.g.) Toubal	Stadium: August 20, 1955 Stadium; Referee: Mohamed Benabdellah

9 February 2017 Round 19	CR Belouizdad	3–0	MO Béjaïa	Belouizdad
16:00	Hamia 55', 68' (pen.); Lakroum 90+1'	Report; Live TV: EPTV Terrestre / TV Tamazight 4		Stadium: Stade du 20 Août 1955; Referee: Oukil

20 February 2017 Round 20	USM Alger	2–1	CR Belouizdad	Algiers
18:00	Benguit 14'; Meziane 72'	Report; Live TV: Canal Algérie / TV Tamazight 4	90+1' Lamhene	Stadium: Stade du 5 Juillet; Referee: Lahlou Benbraham

25 February 2017 Round 21	CR Belouizdad	1–0	DRB Tadjenanet	Belouizdad
16:00	Feham 90+5' (pen.)	Report; Live TV: Canal Algérie		Stadium: Stade du 20 Août 1955; Referee: Abderrezzak Arab

4 March 2017 Round 22	CS Constantine	2–1	CR Belouizdad	Constantine
16:00	Belameiri 15', 22'	Report; Live TV: Canal Algérie	89' Hamia	Stadium: Mohamed Hamlaoui Stadium; Referee: Mohamed Boukhalfa

11 March 2017 Round 23	USM Bel-Abbès	0–0	CR Belouizdad	Sidi Bel Abbès
16:00		Report; Live TV: TV Tamazight 4 / Algérie 3		Stadium: Stade 24 Fevrier 1956; Referee: Rafik Achouri

18 March 2017 Round 24	CR Belouizdad	1–0	RC Relizane	Belouizdad
15:00	Draoui 34'	Report; Live TV: None		Stadium: Stade du 20 Août 1955; Referee: Yazid Ibrir

6 May 2017 Round 25	Olympique de Médéa	2–1	CR Belouizdad	Médéa
16:00	Addadi 9', 90'	Report; Live TV: None	56' Lamhene	Stadium: Stade Imam Lyes de Médéa; Referee: Lahlou Benbraham

13 May 2017 Round 26	CR Belouizdad	3–2	NA Hussein Dey	Algiers
16:00	Feham 2', 74'; Namani 89'	Report; Live TV: Canal Algérie	43' (pen.) Gasmi; 90+3' Bendebka	Stadium: Stade du 5 Juillet; Referee: Abderrezzak Arab

27 May 2017 Round 27	MC Alger	1–0	CR Belouizdad	Algiers
22:30	Hachoud 45+2'	Report; Live TV: Canal Algérie / TV Tamazight 4 / Al-Kass Sports		Stadium: Stade du 5 Juillet; Referee: Lotfi Bekouassa

7 June 2017 Round 28	CR Belouizdad	2–0	USM El Harrach	Algiers
17:00	Feham 50' (pen.); Lakroum 90'	Report; Live TV: None		Stadium: Stade du 5 Juillet; Referee: Mohamed Saïdi

10 June 2017 Round 29	CA Batna	0–1	CR Belouizdad	Batna
17:00		Report; Live TV: None	45+1' (pen.) Hamia	Stadium: Mustapha Seffouhi Stadium; Referee: Redouane Necib

14 June 2017 Round 30	CR Belouizdad	1–1	JS Kabylie	Belouizdad
17:00	Bellaili 77'	Report; Live TV: None	7' Benaldjia	Stadium: Stade du 20 Août 1955; Referee: Farid Bahloul

== Algerian Cup ==
25 November 2016 Round of 64	AS Bordj Ghedir	0–1	CR Belouizdad	Bordj Bou Arréridj
16:00			Feham 66'	Stadium: August 20, 1955 Stadium; Referee: Baâtouche, Mokrane, Benchaâbia

14 December 2016 Round of 32	CR Belouizdad	2–1	US Chaouia	Belouizdad
17:30	Yahia-Chérif 50'; Feham 81' (pen.)	Live TV: TV Tamazight 4	S. Sahbi 39'	Stadium: August 20, 1955 Stadium; Referee: Oukil, Serradj, Arfa

28 December 2016 Round of 16	MC Saïda	1–1 (a.e.t.) (4–5 p)	CR Belouizdad	Saïda
14:30	Zahzouh 50'	Live TV: Canal Algérie	Niati 20'	Stadium: Stade 13 Avril 1958; Referee: Achouri, Tamen, Benhamouda

31 March 2017 Quarter-finals	CR Belouizdad	2–1	CA Bordj Bou Arreridj	Belouizdad
16:00	Hamia 2'; Yahia-Chérif 27'	Live TV: Algérie 3 / TV Tamazight 4	Madouni 32'	Stadium: August 20, 1955 Stadium; Referee: Boukhalfa, Seradj, Ayad

20 June 2017 Semi-finals	CR Belouizdad	0–0 (a.e.t.) (6–5 p)	USM Bel-Abbès	Belouizdad
22:30		Live TV: Canal Algérie / TV Tamazight 4 / Al-Kass Sports		Stadium: August 20, 1955 Stadium; Referee: Said Aouina
	Penalties
	Feham (penalty scored); Aribi (penalty scored); Lakroum (penalty scored); Lamhene (penalty scored); Namani (penalty scored); Bellaili (penalty missed); Heriat (penalty scored)		(penalty scored) Benabderahmane; (penalty scored) Labani; (penalty scored) Tabti; (penalty scored) Lamali; (penalty scored) Zouari; (penalty missed) ? (penalty missed) ?

5 July 2017 Final	CR Belouizdad	1–0 (a.e.t.)	ES Sétif	Algiers
16:45	Yahia-Chérif 117'	Report; Live TV: beIN Sports / Canal Algérie / Al Kass Sports one		Stadium: Stade 5 Juillet 1962; Referee: Mustapha Ghorbal

== Squad information ==
=== Playing statistics ===
No.	Pos	Nat	Player	Total		Ligue 1		Algerian Cup	
No.	Pos	Nat	Player	Apps	Goals	Apps	Goals	Apps	Goals
Goalkeepers
1	GK	(Algeria) ALG	Khaled Boukacem	14	0	13	0	1	0
30	GK	(Algeria) ALG	Abdelkader Salhi	20	0	16	0	4	0
16	GK	(Algeria) ALG	Kamel Soufi	2	0	1	0	1	0
Defenders
15	DF	(Algeria) ALG	Rabah Aich	10	0	7	0	3	0
17	DF	(Algeria) ALG	Amir Bellaili	32	1	27	1	5	0
35	DF	(Algeria) ALG	Réda Betouche	13	0	10	0	3	0
27	DF	(Algeria) ALG	Abdellah Chebira	11	0	7	0	4	0
19	DF	(Algeria) ALG	Tarek Cheurfaoui	27	0	24	0	3	0
23	DF	(Algeria) ALG	Hakim Khoudi	18	0	14	0	4	0
4	DF	(Algeria) ALG	Mohamed Namani	27	2	24	2	3	0
22	DF	(Algeria) ALG	Abdelkrim Nemdil	24	0	20	0	4	0
Midfielders
14	MF	(Algeria) ALG	Zakaria Draoui	34	3	28	3	6	0
10	MF	(Algeria) ALG	Bouazza Feham	31	6	25	4	6	2
6	MF	(Algeria) ALG	Mohamed Heriat	17	0	14	0	3	0
	MF	(Algeria) ALG	Mohamed Adem Izghouti	18	0	15	0	3	0
20	MF	(Algeria) ALG	Mokhtar Lamhene	14	2	12	2	2	0
	MF	(Algeria) ALG	Belqassim Niati	15	1	12	0	3	1
	MF	(Algeria) ALG	Abdelhak Sailaa	2	0	1	0	1	0
24	MF	(Algeria) ALG	Bilal Tarikat	14	0	13	0	1	0
Forwards
12	FW	(Algeria) ALG	Karim Aribi	16	1	13	1	3	0
9	FW	(Algeria) ALG	Mohamed Amine Hamia	14	8	12	7	2	1
28	FW	(Algeria) ALG	Sid Ali Lakroum	26	4	20	4	6	0
25	FW	(Algeria) ALG	Sid Ali Yahia-Chérif	33	4	27	1	6	3
Players transferred out during the season
	FW	(Algeria) ALG	Kamel Zeghli	7	0	7	0	0	0
	FW	(Algeria) ALG	Adel Bougueroua	11	1	11	1	0	0
	FW	(Algeria) ALG	Aboubaker Rebih	15	2	13	2	2	0
	MF	(Algeria) ALG	Nassim Bouchema	9	1	7	1	2	0
	FW	(Benin) BEN	Mohamed Aoudou	8	1	8	1	0	0
	FW	(Algeria) ALG	Mohamed Derrag	15	0	12	0	3	0

Last updated: 1 June 2018
Source: fr.soccerway.com

=== Goalscorers ===
Includes all competitive matches. The list is sorted alphabetically by surname when total goals are equal.

No.	Nat.	Player	Pos.	L 1	AC	TOTAL
9	(Algeria)	Mohamed Amine Hamia	FW	7	1	8
10	(Algeria)	Bouazza Feham	MF	4	2	6
28	(Algeria)	Sid Ali Lakroum	FW	4	0	4
25	(Algeria)	Sid Ali Yahia-Chérif	FW	1	3	4
14	(Algeria)	Zakaria Draoui	MF	3	0	3
20	(Algeria)	Mokhtar Lamhene	MF	2	0	2
4	(Algeria)	Mohamed Namani	DF	2	0	2
	(Algeria)	Aboubaker Rebih	FW	2	0	2
12	(Algeria)	Karim Aribi	FW	1	0	1
	(Algeria)	Adel Bougueroua	FW	1	0	1
	(Benin)	Mohamed Aoudou	FW	1	0	1
	(Algeria)	Nassim Bouchema	MF	1	0	1
17	(Algeria)	Amir Bellaili	DF	1	0	1
	(Algeria)	Belqassim Niati	MF	0	1	1
Own Goals				0	0	0
Totals				30	7	37

== Squad list ==
As of 15 January 2017.

Note: Flags indicate national team as defined under FIFA eligibility rules; some limited exceptions apply. Players may hold more than one non-FIFA nationality.

No.	Pos.	Nation	Player
1	GK	ALG	Khaled Boukacem
4	DF	ALG	Mohamed Namani
6	MF	ALG	Mohamed Heriat
7	MF	ALG	Kamel Zeghli
9	FW	ALG	Mohamed Amine Hamia
10	MF	ALG	Bouazza Feham
12	FW	ALG	Karim Aribi
14	MF	ALG	Zakaria Draoui
15	DF	ALG	Rabah Aich
16	GK	ALG	Kamel Soufi
17	DF	ALG	Amir Bellaili
19	DF	ALG	Tarek Cheurfaoui (captain)

No.	Pos.	Nation	Player
20	MF	ALG	Lamhene Amir Mokhtar
21	MF	ALG	Belkacem Niati
22	DF	ALG	Karim Nemdil
23	DF	ALG	Hakim Khoudi
24	MF	ALG	Bilal Tarikat
25	FW	ALG	Sid Ali Yahia-Chérif
26	FW	ALG	Islam Bouloudene
27	DF	ALG	Abdellah Chebira
28	FW	ALG	Sid Ali Lakroum
30	GK	ALG	Abdelkader Salhi
35	MF	ALG	Réda Betouche

== Transfers ==
=== In ===
No.	Pos.	Nation	Player
—	DF	ALG	Rabah Aïch (from (Algeria) MC Oran)
—	MF	ALG	Nassim Bouchema (from (Algeria) USM Alger)
4	DF	ALG	Mohamed Naamani (from (Algeria) ASO Chlef)
30	GK	ALG	Abdelkader Salhi ( (Algeria) ASO Chlef)
20	DF	ALG	Sofiane Khelili (from (Saudi Arabia) Ettifaq)

=== Out ===
No.	Pos.	Nation	Player
30	GK	ALG	Malik Asselah (to (Algeria) JS Kabylie)
9	FW	ALG	Hichem Nekkache (to (Algeria) MC Alger)
17	DF	ALG	Zakaria Bencherifa (to (Algeria) MO Béjaïa)
14	DF	CMR	Gilles Ngomo (to (Iraq) Al-Quwa Al-Jawiya)
—	DF	ALG	Sofiane Khelili (to (Saudi Arabia) Ettifaq)
—	FW	ALG	Kamel Zeghli (to (Algeria) MC Oran)
—	FW	ALG	Adel Bougueroua (to (Algeria) ES Sétif)
—	FW	ALG	Aboubaker Rebih (to (Algeria) CS Constantine)
—	MF	ALG	Nassim Bouchema (to (Algeria) MO Béjaïa)
—	FW	BEN	Mohamed Aoudou (to (Iraq) Al-Shorta)
—	FW	ALG	Mohamed Derrag (to (Algeria) RC Relizane)
