= 2015–16 CR Belouizdad season =

CR Belouizdad
2015–16 season
- Chairman: Réda Malek
- Head coach: Alain Michel
- Stadium: Stade 20 Août 1955
- Ligue 1: 4th
- Algerian Cup: Round of 32
- Top goalscorer: League: Bouazza Feham (10); All: Bouazza Feham (10)

In the 2015–16 season, CR Belouizdad competed in the Ligue 1 for the 50th season, as well as the Algerian Cup.

== Squad list ==
Players and squad numbers last updated on 18 November 2015.
Note: Flags indicate national team as has been defined under FIFA eligibility rules. Players may hold more than one non-FIFA nationality.

No.	Nat.	Position	Name	Date of birth (age)	Signed from
Goalkeepers
30	(Algeria)	GK	Malik Asselah	8 July 1986 (aged 29)	(Algeria) JS Kabylie
1	(Algeria)	GK	Khaled Boukacem	24 April 1985 (aged 30)	(Algeria) USMM Hadjout
45	(Algeria)	GK	Mohamed Ramzy Abassi	22 June 1992 (aged 23)	(Algeria) Youth system
Defenders
3	(Algeria)		Zakaria Bencherifa	8 September 1991 (aged 24)	(Algeria) Youth system
27	(Algeria)		Abdellah Chebira	12 July 1986 (aged 29)	(Algeria) CA Bordj Bou Arréridj
20	(Algeria)		Sofiane Khelili	9 December 1989 (aged 26)	(Algeria) JS Kabylie
17	(Algeria)		Amir Belaïli	10 February 1991 (aged 24)	(Algeria) CRB Aïn Fakroun
22	(Algeria)		Abdelkrim Nemdil	3 October 1989 (aged 26)	(Algeria) RC Arbaâ
19	(Algeria)		Tarek Cheurfaoui	28 June 1986 (aged 29)	(Algeria) RC Arbaâ
23	(Algeria)		Hakim Khoudi	16 July 1989 (aged 26)	(Algeria) Youth system
	(Algeria)		Maâmar Youcef	3 October 1989 (aged 26)	(Algeria) MO Béjaïa
Midfielders
10	(Algeria)		Bouazza Feham	11 April 1986 (aged 29)	(Algeria) USM Alger
6	(Cameroon)		Gilles Ngomo	23 August 1987 (aged 28)	(Algeria) CS Constantine
24	(Algeria)		Bilal Tarikat	12 June 1991 (aged 24)	(Algeria) Youth system
14	(Algeria)		Zakaria Draoui	20 February 1994 (aged 21)	(Algeria) Youth system
21	(Algeria)		Belkacem Niati	8 February 1988 (aged 27)	(Algeria) USM Bel-Abbès
Forwards
11	(Algeria)		Adel Bougueroua	14 June 1987 (aged 28)	(Algeria) RC Arbaâ
18	(Algeria)		Aboubaker Rebih	18 December 1983 (aged 32)	(Algeria) USM Annaba
8	(Algeria)		Mohamed Derrag	3 April 1985 (aged 30)	(Algeria) RC Arbaâ
15	(Algeria)		Hichem Nekkache	7 March 1991 (aged 24)	(Algeria) MC Oran
25	(Algeria)		Sid Ali Yahia-Chérif	4 January 1985 (aged 30)	(Algeria) JSM Béjaïa
29	(Benin)		Mohamed Aoudou	30 November 1989 (aged 26)	(Algeria) JS Saoura
7	(Algeria)		Sief Zine Mohamed Toumi	7 September 1994 (aged 21)	(Algeria) Youth system

== Competitions ==
=== Overview ===
Competition	Record								Started round	Final position / round	First match	Last match
Competition	G	W	D	L	GF	GA	GD	Win %	Started round	Final position / round	First match	Last match
Ligue 1	30	11	12	7	40	29	+11	36.67	—N/a	4th	15 August 2015	27 May 2015
Algerian Cup	2	1	0	1	5	3	+2	50.00	Round of 64	Round of 32	18 December 2015	9 January 2016
Total	32	12	12	8	45	32	+13	37.50				

== League table ==
Pos	Team	Pld	W	D	L	GF	GA	GD	Pts	Qualification or relegation
2	JS Saoura	30	12	12	6	39	25	+14	48	Qualification for the Champions League preliminary round
3	JS Kabylie	30	12	9	9	27	27	0	45 (Note: JS Kabylie ahead of CR Belouizdad on head-to-head record: JSK–CRB 1–0, CRB–JSK 1–1.)	Qualification for the Confederation Cup preliminary round
4	CR Belouizdad	30	11	12	7	40	29	+11	45	
5	ES Sétif	30	11	11	8	31	19	+12	44 (Note: ES Sétif ahead of MO Béjaïa on head-to-head record: ESS–MOB 0–0, MOB–ESS 0–0.)	
6	MO Béjaïa	30	11	11	8	33	23	+10	44	

Updated to match(es) played on 27 May 2016. Source: DZFoot
Rules for classification: 1) points; 2) head-to-head points; 3) head-to-head goal difference; 4) goal difference; 5) total goals; 6) fairplay ranking; 7) playoff.

=== Results summary ===
Overall								Home						Away					
Pld	W	D	L	GF	GA	GD	Pts	W	D	L	GF	GA	GD	W	D	L	GF	GA	GD
30	11	12	7	40	29	+11	45	7	6	2	26	16	+10	4	6	5	14	13	+1

Last updated: 31 January 2015.
Source: Competitive matches

=== Results by round ===
Round	1	2	3	4	5	6	7	8	9	10	11	12	13	14	15	16	17	18	19	20	21	22	23	24	25	26	27	28	29	30
Ground	A	H	A	H	A	H	A	H	A	H	A	H	A	H	A	H	A	H	A	H	A	H	A	H	A	H	A	H	A	H
Result	D	W	W	D	D	W	L	L	L	W	W	D	W	D	W	W	D	D	L	D	L	L	L	W	D	W	D	D	D	W
Position	11	2	1	4	4	1	2	5	8	3	3	4	2	2	2	2	2	2	2	2	2	5	5	5	5	4	4	5	7	4

Updated to match(es) played on 31 January 2015. Source: Competitive matches
A = Away; H = Home; W = Win; D = Draw; L = Loss

=== Matches ===
Win Draw Loss

13 August 2015 Round 1	MC Alger	0–0	CR Belouizdad	Bologhine
18:00		Report; Live TV: TV Tamazight 4 / Algérie 3		Stadium: Stade Omar Hamadi; Referee: Necib, Etchali, Brahim

22 August 2015 Round 2	CR Belouizdad	3–1	RC Arbaâ	Belouizdad
18:00	Feham 23'; Derrag 25'; Ngomo 65'	Report; Live TV: None	40' Meziane	Stadium: Stade 20 Août 1955; Attendance: 0 (close doors); Referee: Benouza, Omari, Brahim

27 August 2015 Round 3	NA Hussein Dey	0–3	CR Belouizdad	Blida
18:00		Report; Live TV: Algérie 3 / TV Tamazight 4	35', 64' Derrag; 45+3' Nekkache	Stadium: Stade Mustapha Tchaker; Referee: Abid Charef, Tamen, Boulfelfel

12 September 2015 Round 4	CR Belouizdad	1–1	JS Kabylie	Belouizdad
18:00	Bencherifa 90'	Report; Live TV: None	14' Diawara	Stadium: Stade 20 Août 1955; Referee: Arab, Bayoud, Boulefelfel

19 September 2015 Round 5	MC Oran	3–3	CR Belouizdad	Oran
17:00	Moussi 11', 74'; Za'abia 81'	Report; Live TV: TV Tamazight 4 / Canal Algérie	58' (pen.) Yahia-Chérif; 72' Niati; 90+4' Aoudou	Stadium: Stade Ahmed Zabana; Referee: Aouina S., Bensaïd, Aouina F.

28 September 2015 Round 6	CR Belouizdad	2–0	CS Constantine	Belouizdad
18:00	Yahia-Chérif 35'; Feham 88'	Report; Live TV: None		Stadium: Stade 20 Août 1955; Referee: Benouza, Mekkaoui, Omari

2 October 2015 Round 7	MO Béjaïa	1–0	CR Belouizdad	Béjaïa
17:00	Belkacemi 11'	Report; Live TV: TV Tamazight 4 / Canal Algérie		Stadium: Stade de l'Unité Maghrébine; Referee: Boukhalfa, Zerhouni, Benali

17 October 2015 Round 8	CR Belouizdad	1–2	USM Alger	Algiers
16:00	Feham 18' (pen.)	Report; Live TV: Algérie 3	45' Seguer; 47' Nadji	Stadium: Stade 5 Juillet 1962; Referee: Zouaoui, Kechida, Aouina

23 October 2015 Round 9	ES Sétif	1–0	CR Belouizdad	Sétif
17:00	Baouz 63'	Report; Live TV: beIN Sports / Canal Algérie		Stadium: Stade 8 Mai 1945; Referee: Necib, Meghlout, Benacer

30 October 2015 Round 10	RC Relizane	0–1	CR Belouizdad	Relizane
15:00		Report; Live TV: None	23' Feham	Stadium: Stade Tahar Zoughari; Attendance: 0 (close doors); Referee: Achouri, Maâmri, Boulfelfel

6 November 2015 Round 11	CR Belouizdad	3–1	ASM Oran	Belouizdad
16:00	Bougueroua 12', 83'; Nekkache 60'	Report; Live TV: None	66' Elghomari	Stadium: Stade 20 Août 1955; Referee: Aouina, Benaïssa, Chenaoua

21 November 2015 Round 12	USM Blida	1–1	CR Belouizdad	Blida
15:00	Sylla 90+2'	Report; Live TV: None	47' Nekkache	Stadium: Stade Frères Brakni; Referee: Benbraham, Gourari, Benali

28 November 2015 Round 13	CR Belouizdad	2–0	JS Saoura	Belouizdad
16:00	Nekkache 25'; Feham 90+2'	Report; Live TV: None		Stadium: Stade 20 Août 1955; Referee: Bouzerrar, Yahi, Messaoudi

11 December 2015 Round 14	USM El Harrach	1–1	CR Belouizdad	Algiers
16:00	Younes 45+2'	Report; Live TV: TV Tamazight 4 / beIN Sports	33' Feham	Stadium: Stade 5 Juillet 1962; Referee: Bekouassa, Bounoua, Rachedi

26 December 2015 Round 15	CR Belouizdad	3–0	DRB Tadjenanet	Belouizdad
16:00	Yahia-Chérif 49', 58'; Nekkache 51'	Report; Live TV: None		Stadium: Stade 20 Août 1955; Referee: Boukhalfa, Benali, Zerhouni

16 January 2016 Round 16	CR Belouizdad	1–0	MC Alger	Belouizdad
15:00	Derrag 88'	Report; Live TV: / Al Kass Sports / Algérie 3		Stadium: Stade 20 Août 1955; Referee: Boukouassa, Bachiri, Bounoua

23 January 2016 Round 17	RC Arbaâ	0–0	CR Belouizdad	Larbaâ
15:00		Report; Live TV: None		Stadium: Stade Ismaïl Makhlouf; Referee: Achouri, Tamen, Boulflefel

30 January 2016 Round 18	CR Belouizdad	1–1	NA Hussein Dey	Algiers
16:00	Feham 73'	Report; Live TV: Algérie 3	90+1' Gasmi	Stadium: Stade 5 Juillet 1962; Referee: Mial, Itchiali, Béchirène

5 February 2016 Round 19	JS Kabylie	1–0	CR Belouizdad	Tizi Ouzou
15:00	Diawara 18'	Report; Live TV: TV Tamazight 4		Stadium: Stade 1er Novembre 1954; Referee: Abid, Tamen, Boulfelfel

12 February 2016 Round 20	CR Belouizdad	2–2	MC Oran	Belouizdad
16:00	Nekkache 54'; Rebih 90+1' (pen.)	Report; Live TV: TV Tamazight 4	Larbi 23'; Dahar 40'	Stadium: Stade 20 Août 1955; Referee: Arab, Bioud, Hamlaoui

27 February 2016 Round 21	CS Constantine	2–1	CR Belouizdad	Constantine
16:00	Bencherifa 18'; Bezzaz 40' (pen.)	Report; Live TV: None	72' Yahia-Chérif	Stadium: Stade Mohamed Hamlaoui; Attendance: 0 (close doors); Referee: S. Aouina, F. Aouina F, Bennaïssa

5 March 2016 Round 22	CR Belouizdad	1–3	MO Béjaïa	Belouizdad
16:00	Youcef 4'	Report; Live TV: None	54' Hamzaoui; 70' Belkacemi; 87' (pen.) Zerdab	Stadium: Stade 20 Août 1955; Referee: Achouri, Benhamouda, Idir

18 March 2016 Round 23	USM Alger	2–0	CR Belouizdad	Algiers
18:00	Seguer 40'; Meftah 90+2'	Soccerway Report; Live TV: TV Tamazight 4		Stadium: Stade 5 Juillet 1962; Referee: Houasnia, Semsoum, Tarerourth

2 April 2016 Round 24	CR Belouizdad	1–0	ES Sétif	Belouizdad
16:00	Feham 9'	Report; Live TV: Algérie 3		Stadium: Stade 20 Août 1955; Referee: Brahimi, Chiballah, Idir

9 April 2016 Round 25	CR Belouizdad	3–3	RC Relizane	Belouizdad
16:00	Yahia-Chérif 44'; Feham 55' (pen.); Rebih 57'	Report; Live TV: Canal Algérie	42' Zidane; 66' Manucho; 83' Tiaïba	Stadium: Stade 20 Août 1955; Referee: S. Aouina, F. Aouina, Benaissa

23 April 2016 Round 26	ASM Oran	1–3	CR Belouizdad	Oran
16:00	Barka 34'	Report; Live TV: None	27' (pen.) Feham; 62', 66' Nekkache	Stadium: Stade Habib Bouakeul; Referee: Benbaka, Zaghdoud, Nehira

29 April 2016 Round 27	CR Belouizdad	1–1	USM Blida	Belouizdad
17:00	Ngomo 62'	Report; Live TV: TV Tamazight 4	44' Bedrane	Stadium: Stade 20 Août 1955; Referee: Boukhalfa, Zerhouni, Bourrechou

16 May 2016 Round 28	JS Saoura	0–0	CR Belouizdad	Béchar
18:00		Report; Live TV: None		Stadium: Stade 20 Août 1955; Referee: Benouza, Zerhouni, Ayad

20 May 2016 Round 29	CR Belouizdad	1–1	USM El Harrach	Algiers
17:30	Derrag 8'	Report; Live TV: None	70' Gharbi	Stadium: Stade 5 Juillet 1962; Referee: Bouzerar, Yahi, Lakni

27 May 2016 Round 30	DRB Tadjenanet	0–1	CR Belouizdad	Tadjenanet
17:30		Report; Live TV: beIN Sports / Al Kass Sports / Algérie 3	52' Derrag	Stadium: Lahoua Smaïl Stadium; Referee: Saidi, Hadji Said, Abid

== Algerian Cup ==
18 December 2015 Round of 64	CR Belouizdad	4–1	ASO Chlef	Belouizdad
16:00	Derrag 22', 46' (pen.), 53'; Bougueroua 90+1'	Report	Elaïd 77'	Stadium: Stade 20 Août 1955; Referee: Abid Charef, Tamen, Boulfelfel

9 January 2016 Round of 32	ES Sétif	2–1 (a.e.t.)	CR Belouizdad	Sétif
16:00	Ziaya 7' (pen.); Dagoulou 92'	Report	43' Bougueroua	Stadium: Stade 8 Mai 1945; Referee: Benouza, Oumari, Ayad

== Squad information ==
=== Playing statistics ===
No.	Pos	Nat	Player	Total		Ligue 1		Algerian Cup	
No.	Pos	Nat	Player	Apps	Goals	Apps	Goals	Apps	Goals
Goalkeepers
30	GK	(Algeria) ALG	Malik Asselah	26	0	25	0	1	0
1	GK	(Algeria) ALG	Khaled Boukacem	6	0	5	0	1	0
45	GK	(Algeria) ALG	Mohamed Ramzy Abassi	0	0	0	0	0	0
Defenders
3	DF	(Algeria) ALG	Zakaria Bencherifa	13	1	12	1	1	0
27	DF	(Algeria) ALG	Abdellah Chebira	7	0	7	0	0	0
20	DF	(Algeria) ALG	Sofiane Khelili	28	0	26	0	2	0
17	DF	(Algeria) ALG	Amir Belaïli	24	0	22	0	2	0
22	DF	(Algeria) ALG	Abdelkrim Nemdil	21	0	19	0	2	0
19	DF	(Algeria) ALG	Tarek Cheurfaoui	23	0	22	0	1	0
23	DF	(Algeria) ALG	Hakim Khoudi	13	0	12	0	1	0
	DF	(Algeria) ALG	Maâmar Youcef	1	1	1	1	0	0
Midfielders
10	MF	(Algeria) ALG	Bouazza Feham	32	10	30	10	2	0
6	MF	(Cameroon) CMR	Gilles Ngomo	31	2	29	2	2	0
24	MF	(Algeria) ALG	Bilal Tarikat	9	0	8	0	1	0
14	MF	(Algeria) ALG	Zakaria Draoui	29	0	28	0	1	0
21	MF	(Algeria) ALG	Belkacem Niati	27	1	25	1	2	0
	MF	(Algeria) ALG	Adem Izghouti	1	0	1	0	0	0
Forwards
11	FW	(Algeria) ALG	Adel Bougueroua	27	4	25	2	2	2
18	FW	(Algeria) ALG	Aboubaker Rebih	19	2	17	2	2	0
8	FW	(Algeria) ALG	Mohamed Derrag	27	9	25	6	2	3
15	FW	(Algeria) ALG	Hichem Nekkache	31	8	29	8	2	0
25	FW	(Algeria) ALG	Sid Ali Yahia-Chérif	30	6	29	6	1	0
29	FW	(Benin) BEN	Mohamed Aoudou	19	1	19	1	0	0
	FW	(Algeria) ALG	Islam Bouloudene	1	0	1	0	0	0
Players transferred out during the season

Source: Competitions

== Transfers ==
=== In ===
Date	Position	Player	From club	Transfer fee	Source
1 June 2015	FW	(Algeria) Sid Ali Yahia-Chérif	JSM Béjaïa	Free transfer	
10 June 2015	MF	(Algeria) Bouazza Feham	USM Alger	Free transfer	
22 June 2015	DF	(Algeria) Amir Belaïli	CRB Aïn Fakroun	Free transfer	
1 July 2015	FW	(Algeria) Hichem Nekkache	MC Oran	Free transfer	
15 July 2015	FW	(Benin) Mohamed Aoudou	JS Saoura	Free transfer	
20 July 2015	MF	(Algeria) Belkacem Niati	USM Bel-Abbès	Free transfer	
17 December 2015	DF	(Algeria) Maâmar Youcef	MO Béjaïa	Free transfer	
