= 2017 Algerian Cup final =

- Stade du 5 Juillet hosted the match
- Event: 2016–17 Algerian Cup
CR Belouizdad	ES Sétif
1	0
- Date: July 5, 2017
- Venue: Stade 5 Juillet 1962, Algiers
- Referee: Mustapha Ghorbal
- Attendance: 50,000
- Weather: Very hot 33°C

The 2017 Algerian Cup final was the 53rd final of the Algerian Cup. The final took place on July 5, 2017, at Stade 5 Juillet 1962 in Algiers with kick-off at 16:30.

== Route to the final ==
CR Belouizdad

Round of 64	AS Bordj Ghedir	0–1	CR Belouizdad
Round of 32	CR Belouizdad	2–1	US Chaouia
Round of 16	MC Saïda	1–1; 4 – 5 (pen.)	CR Belouizdad
Quarter-finals	CR Belouizdad	2–1	CA Bordj Bou Arreridj
Semifinals	CR Belouizdad	0–0; 6 – 5 (pen.)	USM Bel-Abbès

ES Sétif

Round of 64	ES Sétif	2–0	SCM Oran
Round of 32	DRB Staouéli	0–5	ES Sétif
Round of 16	ES Sétif	2–2; 7 – 6 (pen.)	JS Saoura
Quarter-finals	ES Sétif	4–0	US Tébessa
Semifinals	MC Alger	2–3 (a.e.t.)	ES Sétif

== Pre-match ==
=== Details ===
July 5, 2017
16:45

CR Belouizdad	1–0 (a.e.t.)	ES Sétif
Yahia-Chérif 117'	Report

Stade 5 Juillet 1962, Algiers
Attendance: 50,000
Referee: Mustapha Ghorbal

GK	30	(Algeria) Abdelkader Salhi
CB	19	(Algeria) Tarek Cheurfaoui (c)	(yellow card) 78'	(substituted off) 79'
CB	4	(Algeria) Mohamed Namani
RB	17	(Algeria) Amir Bellaili
CB	23	(Algeria) Hakim Khoudi
LB	27	(Algeria) Abdellah Chebira		(substituted off) 112'
DM	20	(Algeria) Lamhene Amir Mokhtar
DM	14	(Algeria) Zakaria Draoui	(yellow card) 33'
AM	10	(Algeria) Bouazza Feham
DM	6	(Algeria) Mohamed Heriat
CF	28	(Algeria) Sid Ali Lakroum		(substituted off) 89'
Substitutes :
RW	25	(Algeria) Sid Ali Yahia-Chérif		(substituted on) 79'
CF	12	(Algeria) Karim Aribi		(substituted on) 89'
RM	31	(Algeria) Adem Izghouti		(substituted on) 112'
Manager :
(Morocco) Badou Zaki

GK	1	(Algeria) Sofiane Khedairia
LB	13	(Algeria) Sid Ali Lamri	(yellow card) 65'
CB	2	(Algeria) Sofiane Bouchar		(substituted off) 71'
RB	25	(Algeria) Miloud Rebiai
CB	20	(Algeria) Ryad Kenniche
CB	15	(Algeria) Abdelkader Bedrane	(yellow card) 75'
AM	7	(Algeria) Akram Djahnit
DM	8	(Algeria) Hamza Aït Ouamar
RW	10	(Algeria) Abdelmoumene Djabou (c)
LW	27	(Algeria) Zakaria Haddouche		(substituted off) 95'
CF	11	(Algeria) Adel Bougueroua
Substitutes :
CF	12	(Algeria) Abdelhakim Amokrane		(substituted on) 71'
LB	22	(Algeria) Sofiane Boutebba		(substituted on) 95'
Manager :
(Algeria) Kheïreddine Madoui

MATCH OFFICIALS

- Assistant referees:
  - Abdelhak Etchiali
  - Bouabdellah Omari
- Fourth official:

== Media coverage ==
2017 Algerian Cup Final Media Coverage
Country	Television Channel
Algeria	EPTV Channels
Qatar	beIN Sports
Qatar	Al-Kass Sports
United Arab Emirates	AD Sports
United Arab Emirates	Dubai Sports
Jordan	Jordan Sports
