= 2013–14 RC Arbaâ season =

RC Arbaâ
2013–14 season
- President: Djamel Amani (from 3 July 2013)
- Head coach: Tahar Chérif El-Ouazzani (from 7 July 2013) (until 30 June 2014)
- Stadium: Brakni Brothers Stadium, Blida
- Ligue 1: 7th
- Algerian Cup: Round of 32
- Top goalscorer: League: Adel Bougueroua (13); All: Adel Bougueroua (13)

In the 2013–14 season, RC Arbaâ is competing in the Ligue 1 for the 1st season, as well as the Algerian Cup. They will be competing in Ligue 1, and the Algerian Cup.

== Competitions ==
=== Overview ===
Competition	Record								Started round	Final position / round	First match	Last match
Competition	G	W	D	L	GF	GA	GD	Win %	Started round	Final position / round	First match	Last match
Ligue 1	30	12	8	10	33	32	+1	40.00	—N/a	7th	24 August 2013	22 May 2014
Algerian Cup	2	1	1	0	2	1	+1	50.00	Round of 64	Round of 32	6 December 2013	20 December 2013
Total	32	13	9	10	35	33	+2	40.63				

Updated to match played 9 May 2017
Source: Competitions

== League table ==
Pos	Team	Pld	W	D	L	GF	GA	GD	Pts	Qualification or relegation
5	USM El Harrach (Note: USM El Harrach would have qualified for the CAF Confederation Cup preliminary round by finishing fourth in the 2013–14 Algerian Ligue Professionnelle 1, but due to the penalty imposed on them by CAF after their withdrawal from the 2014 CAF Champions League, they could not participate.)	30	13	8	9	34	27	+7	47	
6	MC Alger	30	13	6	11	26	25	+1	45	Qualification for the Confederation Cup preliminary round
7	RC Arbaâ (Note: RC Arbaâ would have qualified for the CAF Confederation Cup preliminary round by finishing seventh in the 2013–14 Algerian Ligue Professionnelle 1, after the elimination of the USM El Harrach but were unable to participate because they were not adopted by the CAF as a professional team.)	30	12	8	10	33	32	+1	44	
8	ASO Chlef	30	11	10	9	29	19	+10	43	Qualification for the Confederation Cup preliminary round
9	JS Saoura	30	12	7	11	38	36	+2	43	

Updated to match(es) played on 22 May 2014. Source: DZFoot
Rules for classification: 1) points; 2) head-to-head points; 3) head-to-head goal difference; 4) goal difference; 5) total goals; 6) fairplay ranking; 7) playoff.

=== Results summary ===
Overall								Home						Away					
Pld	W	D	L	GF	GA	GD	Pts	W	D	L	GF	GA	GD	W	D	L	GF	GA	GD
0	0	0	0	0	0	0	0	0	0	0	0	0	0	0	0	0	0	0	0

Last updated: 29 December 2014.
Source: Competitive matches

=== Results by round ===
Round	1	2	3	4	5	6	7	8	9	10	11	12	13	14	15	16	17	18	19	20	21	22	23	24	25	26	27	28	29	30
Ground	A	H	H	A	H	A	H	A	H	A	H	A	H	A	H	H	A	A	H	A	H	A	H	A	H	A	H	A	H	A
Result	L	D	W	L	W	W	W	L	W	L	W	L	L	L	D	W	W	L	D	L	W	W	D	D	L	D	D	L	W	D
Position																														7

Updated to match(es) played on 29 December 2014. Source: Competitive matches
A = Away; H = Home; W = Win; D = Draw; L = Loss

=== Matches ===
24 August 2013 Round 1	CR Belouizdad	1 - 0	RC Arbaâ	Algiers
18:00	Bourakba 83'	Report		Stadium: Stade 20 Août 1955; Referee: Djamel Haimoudi

31 August 2013 Round 2	RC Arbaâ	1 - 1	JSM Béjaïa	Blida
17:00	M'Changama 47'	Report	57' A. Belgherbi	Stadium: Stade Frères Brakni; Referee: Mohamed Bichari

3 September 2013 Round 3	RC Arbaâ	2 - 1	USM El Harrach	Blida
17:00	Zeddam 5'; B. Abdelkadous 61'	Report	17' A. El Amali	Stadium: Stade Frères Brakni; Referee: Farouk Houasnia

14 September 2013 Round 4	ASO Chlef	2 - 0	RC Arbaâ	Chlef
18:00	Daham 16'; Haddouche 90+2'	Report		Stadium: Stade Mohamed Boumezrag; Referee: Mohamed Saïdi

21 September 2013 Round 5	RC Arbaâ	1 - 0	MO Béjaïa	Blida
16:00	Cheurfaoui 47'	Report		Stadium: Stade Frères Brakni; Referee: Mokhtar Amalou

28 September 2013 Round 6	ES Sétif	0 - 1	RC Arbaâ	Sétif
18:00		Report	50' Harrouche	Stadium: Stade 8 Mai 1945; Referee: Mohamed Sahraoui

5 October 2013 Round 7	RC Arbaâ	2 - 0	CA Bordj Bou Arréridj	Blida
16:00	Zeddam 39'; Abbes 67'	Report		Stadium: Stade Frères Brakni; Referee: Mohamed Bichari

19 October 2013 Round 8	MC Alger	2 - 0	RC Arbaâ	Algiers
18:00	Hachoud 28', 64'	Report		Stadium: Stade Omar Hamadi; Referee: Mohamed Benouza

26 October 2013 Round 9	RC Arbaâ	2 - 1	JS Saoura	Blida
15:00	Amiri 30' (pen.), 57'	Report	11' Beldjilali	Stadium: Stade Frères Brakni; Referee: Said Aouina

2 November 2013 Round 10	JS Kabylie	1 - 0	RC Arbaâ	Tizi Ouzou
17:00	Chibane 43'	Report		Stadium: Stade du 1er Novembre 1954; Referee: Rafik Achouri

9 November 2013 Round 11	RC Arbaâ	1 - 0	CS Constantine	Blida
15:00	Amiri 89'	Report		Stadium: Stade Frères Brakni; Referee: Mohamed Ghorbal

23 November 2013 Round 12	MC El Eulma	2 - 1	RC Arbaâ	El Eulma
18:00	Chenihi 32'; Hamiti 83' (pen.)	Report	42' Raït	Stadium: Stade Messaoud Zougar; Referee: Merzak Halalchi

30 November 2013 Round 13	RC Arbaâ	0 - 1	USM Alger	Blida
15:00		Report	47' (pen.) Gasmi	Stadium: Stade Frères Brakni; Referee: Mehdi Abid Charef

13 December 2013 Round 14	CRB Aïn Fakroun	1 - 0	RC Arbaâ	Aïn M'lila
15:00	Ziad 61'	Report		Stadium: Stade des Frères Demane Debbih; Referee: Mohamed Benouza

28 December 2013 Round 15	RC Arbaâ	1 - 1	MC Oran	Blida
15:00	Bougueroua 49' (pen.)	Report	42' (pen.) F. Amrane	Stadium: Stade Frères Brakni; Referee: Redouane Necib

18 January 2014 Round 16	RC Arbaâ	3 - 2	CR Belouizdad	Blida
15:00	Bougueroua 39' (pen.), 78', 82' (pen.)	Report	14', 50' Rebih	Stadium: Stade Frères Brakni; Referee: Boubekeur Zouaoui

1 February 2014 Round 17	JSM Béjaïa	0 - 1	RC Arbaâ	Béjaïa
15:00		Report	68' Bougueroua	Stadium: Stade de l'Unité Maghrébine; Referee: Rafik Achouri

8 February 2014 Round 18	USM El Harrach	2 - 1	RC Arbaâ	Algiers
15:00	Younes 30'; Abid 59'	Report	15' Bougueroua	Stadium: Stade 1er Novembre 1954; Referee: Merzak Halalchi

15 February 2014 Round 19	RC Arbaâ	0 - 0	ASO Chlef	Blida
15:00		Report		Stadium: Stade Frères Brakni; Referee: Said Aouina

22 February 2014 Round 20	MO Béjaïa	2 - 0	RC Arbaâ	Béjaïa
18:00	Dehouche 76'; Yettou 90+1'	Report		Stadium: Stade de l'Unité Maghrébine; Referee: Djamel Haimoudi

27 February 2014 Round 21	RC Arbaâ	1 - 0	ES Sétif	Blida
15:00	Amiri 28' (pen.)	Report		Stadium: Stade Frères Brakni; Referee: Farouk Houasnia

8 March 2014 Round 22	CA Bordj Bou Arréridj	1 - 3	RC Arbaâ	Bordj Bou Arréridj
15:00	Chebira 87'	Report	35' Bougueroua; 45+1' Abdelkadous; 83' (pen.) Dramé	Stadium: Stade 20 Août 1955; Referee: Mohamed Ghorbal

15 March 2014 Round 23	RC Arbaâ	0 - 0	MC Alger	Blida
15:00		Report		Stadium: Stade Frères Brakni; Referee: Mohamed Benouza

22 March 2014 Round 24	JS Saoura	1 - 1	RC Arbaâ	Béchar
15:00	A. Benmohamed 85'	Report	15' (pen.) Amiri	Stadium: Stade 20 Août 1955; Referee: Mehdi Abid Charef

25 April 2014 Round 25	RC Arbaâ	4 - 3	JS Kabylie	Larbaâ
15:00	Amiri 4'; Mokdad 16'; Bougueroua 24'; E. Lazaref 72'	Report	60', 90+1' Ebossé Bodjongo; 66' Mekkaoui	Stadium: Stade Ismaïl Makhlouf; Referee: Boubekeur Zouaoui

3 May 2014 Round 26	CS Constantine	1 - 1	RC Arbaâ	Constantine
16:00	Boulemdaïs 38'	Report	5' Bougueroua	Stadium: Stade Mohamed Hamlaoui; Referee: Mohamed Saïdi

10 May 2014 Round 27	RC Arbaâ	1 - 1	MC El Eulma	Larbaâ
17:00	Bougueroua 75'	Report	6' Derrardja	Stadium: Stade Ismaïl Makhlouf; Referee: Mohamed Sahraoui

13 May 2014 Round 28	USM Alger	2 - 1	RC Arbaâ	Algiers
17:00	Khoualed 16'; Feham 50'	Report	70' Bougueroua	Stadium: Stade Omar Hamadi; Referee: Ahmed Bouzrar

17 May 2014 Round 29	RC Arbaâ	2 - 1	CRB Aïn Fakroun	Larbaâ
17:00	Amiri 80'; Bougueroua 90'	Report	49' Sahbi	Stadium: Stade Ismaïl Makhlouf; Referee: Lyés Bekouassa

24 May 2014 Round 30	MC Oran	2 - 2	RC Arbaâ	Oran
17:00	Benyettou 35', 69' (pen.)	Report	5' Bougueroua; 40' M. Dramé	Stadium: Ahmed Zabana Stadium; Referee: Abderrezzak Arab

=== Algerian Cup ===
6 December 2013 Round of 64	USM El Harrach	1 – 2	RC Arbaâ	Constantine
17:00	Sylla 28'	Repport	Cherfaoui 35'; Belkaroui 116'	Stadium: Stade Mohamed Hamlaoui

20 December 2013 Round of 32	CRB Aïn Fakroun	0 – 0 (4 – 3 p)	RC Arbaâ	Aïn M'lila
14:30		Repport		Stadium: Stade des Frères Demane Debbih; Referee: Saïdi, Bechirene, Rezguane

== Squad information ==
=== Playing statistics ===
No.	Pos	Nat	Player	Total		Ligue 1		Algerian Cup	
No.	Pos	Nat	Player	Apps	Goals	Apps	Goals	Apps	Goals
Goalkeepers
31	GK	(Algeria) ALG	Ahmed Fellah	16	0	16	0	0	0
	GK	(Algeria) ALG	Mohamed Seghir Kara	13	0	13	0	0	0
	GK	(Algeria) ALG	Sofiane Alouachiche	1	0	1	0	0	0
Defenders
25	DF	(Algeria) ALG	Hamza Zeddam	29	2	29	2	0	0
5	DF	(Algeria) ALG	Smail Chaoui	14	0	14	0	0	0
3	DF	(Algeria) ALG	Kheireddine Boukhiar	5	0	5	0	0	0
30	DF	(Algeria) ALG	Hussein Boukatouh	8	0	8	0	0	0
4	DF	(Algeria) ALG	Tarek Cheurfaoui	24	1	24	1	0	0
24	DF	(Algeria) ALG	El Hadi Belaid	25	0	25	0	0	0
	DF	(Algeria) ALG	Karim Nemdil	25	0	25	0	0	0
Midfielders
18	MF	(Algeria) ALG	Abdelmalek Mokdad	13	1	13	1	0	0
10	MF	(Algeria) ALG	Abou El Kacem Hadji	20	0	20	0	0	0
14	MF	(Algeria) ALG	Hocine Harrouche	24	1	24	1	0	0
	MF	(Algeria) ALG	Oussama Zouak	3	0	3	0	0	0
9	MF	(Algeria) ALG	Billel Abdelkadous	22	2	22	2	0	0
	MF	(Comoros) COM	Youssouf M'Changama	15	1	15	1	0	0
21	MF	(Algeria) ALG	Bahi Lazaref	13	1	13	1	0	0
	MF	(Algeria) ALG	Ali Amiri	29	7	29	7	0	0
7	MF	(Algeria) ALG	Samir Abbes	11	1	11	1	0	0
27	MF	(Algeria) ALG	Said Bouchouk	5	0	5	0	0	0
	MF	(Cameroon) CMR	Bertrand Owundi	1	0	1	0	0	0
16	MF	(Algeria) ALG	Mohamed Billal Rait	26	1	26	1	0	0
	MF	(Algeria) ALG	Abderahim Kobbi	2	0	2	0	0	0
	MF	(Algeria) ALG	Mohamed Sebati	1	0	1	0	0	0
Forwards
	FW	(Algeria) ALG	Mouaouia Meklouche	10	0	10	0	0	0
11	FW	(Algeria) ALG	Adel Bougueroua	23	13	23	13	0	0
	FW	(Algeria) ALG	Fethi Noubli	11	0	11	0	0	0
	FW	(Cameroon) CMR	Vincent Georges	1	0	1	0	0	0
29	FW	(Senegal) SEN	Mouhamadou Dramé	13	2	13	2	0	0
	FW	(Algeria) ALG	Adel Benachour	1	0	1	0	0	0
Players transferred out during the season

Last updated: 8 June 2019
Source: fr.soccerway.com

== Transfers ==
=== In ===
Date	Pos	Player	From club	Transfer fee	Source
1 July 2013	DF	(Algeria) Hussein Boukatouh	USM Alger Reserve team	Free transfer	
1 July 2013	MF	(Algeria) Mohamed Billal Rait	Olympique de Médéa	Free transfer	
1 July 2013	MF	(Algeria) (France) Samir Abbes	(France) ES Pennoise	Undisclosed	
1 July 2013	FW	(Algeria) Bahi Lazaref	Paradou AC	Undisclosed	
1 July 2013	GK	(Algeria) Mohamed Seghir Kara	USM Alger Reserve team	Loan one year	
10 July 2013	DF	(Algeria) Hamza Zeddam	MC Alger	Free transfer	
10 July 2013	FW	(Algeria) Mouaouia Meklouche	MC Alger	Undisclosed	
10 July 2013	GK	(Algeria) Ahmed Fellah	CA Bordj Bou Arréridj	Free transfer	
10 July 2013	DF	(Algeria) Kheireddine Boukhiar	AS Khroub	Undisclosed	
12 July 2013	MF	(Algeria) (Morocco) Abou El Kacem Hadji	JSM Béjaïa	Undisclosed	
23 July 2013	DF	(Algeria) Karim Nemdil	ES Sétif	Loan one year	
15 July 2013	MF	(Comoros) (France) Youssouf M'Changama	Unattached	Free transfer	
25 July 2013	FW	(Cameroon) Vincent Georges	(Indonesia) Persik Kediri	Undisclosed	
31 July 2013	MF	(Algeria) (France) Billel Abdelkadous	(Belgium) Royal Excelsior Virton	Undisclosed	
31 July 2013	MF	(Algeria) Said Bouchouk	JS Kabylie	Free transfer	
11 December 2013	MF	(Algeria) (France) Abdelmalek Mokdad	Unattached	Free transfer	
9 January 2014	MF	(Senegal) (France) Mouhamadou Dramé	(France) AS Béziers	Undisclosed	
15 January 2014	DF	(Algeria) Oussama Zouak	WA Tlemcen	Free transfer	
15 January 2014	MF	(Cameroon) Bertrand Owundi	(Cameroon) Coton Sport	Free transfer	

=== Out ===
Date	Pos	Player	To club	Transfer fee	Source
22 October 2013	MF	(Algeria) Said Bouchouk	CA Batna	Free transfer	
28 December 2013	FW	(Algeria) Fethi Noubli	USM Blida	Free transfer	
31 December 2013	FW	(Algeria) Mouaouia Meklouche	USM Blida	Free transfer	
