= 2021–22 Olympique de Médéa season =

Olympique de Médéa
2021–22 season
- President: Mahfoud Boukalkal (until 27 September 2021); Kamel Damadji (from 27 September 2021)
- Head coach: Lotfi Sellimi (from 5 October 2021) (until 25 January 2022); Karim Zaoui (from 14 February 2022)
- Stadium: Stade Imam Lyes
- Ligue 1: 15th (relegated)
- Top goalscorer: League: Mohamed El Siddik Baali (10 goals); All: Mohamed El Siddik Baali (10 goals)

In the 2021–22 season, Olympique de Médéa competed in the Ligue 1 for the 5th season. It was their 2nd consecutive season in the top flight of Algerian football. On August 30, 2021 Hassan Hammar the former president of ES Sétif signed to be the sporting director after the agreement with Mahfoud Boukalkal.

== Squad list ==
Players and squad numbers last updated on 20 October 2021.
Note: Flags indicate national team as has been defined under FIFA eligibility rules. Players may hold more than one non-FIFA nationality.

No.	Nat.	Position	Name	Date of birth (age)	Signed from
Goalkeepers
1	(Algeria)	GK	Wassim Mimoune	30 August 1999 (aged 22)	(Algeria) NA Hussein Dey
16	(Algeria)	GK	Mohamed Lotfi Anis Osmani	27 June 1996 (aged 25)	(Algeria) CS Constantine
20	(Algeria)	GK	Said Daas	15 May 1999 (aged 22)	(Algeria) ES Sétif
Defenders
2	(Algeria)	CB	Rabah Aït Kaci	2 September 1997 (aged 24)	(Algeria) CRB Dar Beida
3	(Algeria)	CB	Abderrahmane Nehari	9 April 1994 (aged 27)	(Algeria) ASO Chlef
4	(Algeria)	CB	Adnene Ladjabi	11 November 1999 (aged 22)	(Algeria) Youth system
7	(Algeria)	RB	Mohamed Nâas Araba	14 April 1991 (aged 30)	(Algeria) MO Béjaïa
12	(Algeria)	LB	Oussama Kaddour	12 May 1997 (aged 24)	(Algeria) JS Saoura
14	(Algeria)	CB	Mehdi Messaoudène	1 February 1993 (aged 28)	(Algeria) OM Arzew
21	(Algeria)	RB	Amir Laidouni	20 September 1999 (aged 22)	(Algeria) ES Sétif
26	(Algeria)	CB	Mohamed Benahmed	4 December 1995 (aged 26)	(Algeria) SC Aïn Defla
Midfielders
5	(Algeria)	MF	Omar Boudoumi	22 April 1990 (aged 31)	(Algeria) MC El Eulma
6	(Algeria)	MF	Mohamed Djahli	10 November 1998 (aged 23)	(Algeria) ES Sétif
8	(Algeria)	MF	Ilyes Sidhoum	10 August 1989 (aged 32)	(Algeria) NA Hussein Dey
10	(Algeria)	MF	Khalil Semahi	20 January 1995 (aged 26)	(Algeria) USM Bel Abbès
11	(Algeria)	MF	Tarek Belouchat	16 April 1997 (aged 24)	(Algeria) ES Ben Aknoun
13	(Algeria)	MF	Houssameddine Bouras	15 March 1998 (aged 23)	(Algeria) ASM Oran
17	(Algeria)	MF	Ibrahim Benallal	6 March 1995 (aged 26)	(Algeria) A Bou Saâda
18	(Algeria)	MF	Riad Gharrich	17 November 1990 (aged 31)	(Algeria) MC Saïda
19	(Algeria)	MF	Ahmed Gagaa	15 January 1994 (aged 27)	(Algeria) CS Constantine
25	(Algeria)	MF	Youcef Bechou	1 March 1997 (aged 24)	(Algeria) CR Belouizdad
Forwards
9	(Algeria)	FW	Mohamed El Siddik Baâli	22 January 1995 (aged 26)	(Algeria) A Bou Saâda
15	(Algeria)	FW	Khier-Anes Belaid	24 June 1999 (aged 22)	(Algeria) ES Sétif
22	(Algeria)	FW	Lounes Mokrani	14 July 1998 (aged 23)	(Algeria) RC Kouba
23	(Algeria)	FW	Sid Ali Lakroum	6 October 1987 (aged 34)	(Saudi Arabia) Al-Qaisumah
24	(Algeria)	FW	Yasser Berbache	8 February 1996 (aged 25)	(Algeria) ES Sétif
27	(Algeria)	FW	Walid Lakroum	19 September 1994 (aged 27)	(Algeria) Youth system

== Competitions ==
=== Overview ===
Competition	Record								Started round	Final position / round	First match	Last match
Competition	G	W	D	L	GF	GA	GD	Win %	Started round	Final position / round	First match	Last match
Ligue 1	34	10	6	18	33	53	−20	29.41	—N/a	15th	29 October 2021	10 June 2022
Total	34	10	6	18	33	53	−20	29.41				

Updated to match played 10 June 2022
Source: Competitions

== League table ==
Pos	Team	Pld	W	D	L	GF	GA	GD	Pts	Qualification or relegation
13	NC Magra	34	13	6	15	31	36	−5	45	
14	RC Arbaâ	34	10	13	11	40	45	−5	43	
15	Olympique de Médéa (R)	34	10	6	18	32	53	−21	36	Relegation to Algerian Ligue 2
16	NA Hussein Dey (R)	34	5	7	22	33	66	−33	22	Relegation to Algerian Ligue 2
17	RC Relizane (R)	34	4	8	22	31	87	−56	20	Relegation to Algerian Ligue 2

Updated to match(es) played on 17 June 2022. Source: the-sports.org
Rules for classification: 1) points; 2) head-to-head points; 3) head-to-head goal difference; 4) goal difference; 5) total goals; 6) fairplay ranking; 7) playoff.
(R) Relegated

=== Results summary ===
Overall								Home						Away					
Pld	W	D	L	GF	GA	GD	Pts	W	D	L	GF	GA	GD	W	D	L	GF	GA	GD
34	10	6	18	33	53	−20	36	6	5	6	21	24	−3	4	1	12	12	29	−17

Last updated: 10 June 2022.
Source: Competitive matches

=== Results by round ===
Round	1	2	3	4	5	6	7	8	9	10	11	12	13	14	15	16	17	18	19	20	21	22	23	24	25	26	27	28	29	30	31	32	33	34
Ground	H	A	H	A	H	A	H	A	H	A	A	H	A	H	A	H	A	A	H	A	H	A	H	A	H	A	H	H	A	H	A	H	A	H
Result	D	W	W	L	W	W	D	L	L	L	L	L	L	L	L	L	L	L	L	W	D	L	W	D	W	L	W	L	W	W	L	D	L	D
Position	11	5	3	8	6	2	3	7	8	8	10	10	10	11	14	15	16	16	16	16	15	16	15	15	15	15	15	15	15	15	15	15	15	15

Updated to match(es) played on 10 June 2022. Source: Competitive matches
A = Away; H = Home; W = Win; D = Draw; L = Loss

=== Matches ===
The league fixtures were announced on 7 October 2021.

2 November 2021 Round 1	Olympique de Médéa	0–0	JS Kabylie	Médéa
15:00		Report		Stadium: Stade Imam Lyes; Referee: Abdelmoumen Touabti

29 October 2021 Round 2	ASO Chlef	0–1	Olympique de Médéa	Chlef
15:00		Report	Nehari 44'	Stadium: Stade Mohamed Boumezrag; Referee: Abderrezzak Arab

7 November 2021 Round 3	Olympique de Médéa	1–0	MC Oran	Médéa
15:00	Nehari 45'	Report		Stadium: Stade Imam Lyes; Referee: Akram Mechairia

20 November 2021 Round 4	CR Belouizdad	2–1	Olympique de Médéa	Belouizdad
14:30	Bouchar 17'; Bakir 21' (pen.)	Report	Berbache 83' (pen.)	Stadium: Stade 20 Août 1955; Referee: Houssam Benyahia

25 November 2021 Round 5	Olympique de Médéa	3–1	NC Magra	Médéa
14:30	Baâli 62'; Lakroum 69', 85'	Report	Meghazi 47'	Stadium: Stade Imam Lyes; Referee: Lahlou Benbraham

3 December 2021 Round 6	WA Tlemcen	0–2	Olympique de Médéa	Tlemcen
15:00		Report	Baâli 34'; Lakroum 37' (pen.)	Stadium: Stade Akid Lotfi; Referee: Nadjib Meziani

11 December 2021 Round 7	Olympique de Médéa	0–0	MC Alger	Médéa
14:30		Report		Stadium: Stade Imam Lyes; Referee: Abderrezzak Arab

18 December 2021 Round 8	CS Constantine	1–0	Olympique de Médéa	Constantine
13:30	Debbih 28'	Report		Stadium: Stade Ramdane Benabdelmalek; Referee: Mohamed Saïdi

24 December 2021 Round 9	Olympique de Médéa	0–1	Paradou AC	Médéa
15:00		Report	Bouzok 81'	Stadium: Stade Imam Lyes; Referee: Ali Nader

28 December 2021 Round 10	RC Relizane	2–1	Olympique de Médéa	Relizane
14:30	Balegh 21' (pen.), 50'	Report	Baâli 60'	Stadium: Tahar Zoughari Stadium; Referee: Said Aouina

2 January 2022 Round 11	ES Sétif	3–0	Olympique de Médéa	Sétif
18:00	Benayad 53'; Djabou 76'; Debbari 89'	Report		Stadium: Stade 8 Mai 1945; Attendance: 0 (close doors); Referee: Abdelali Ibrir

8 January 2022 Round 12	Olympique de Médéa	1–2	NA Hussein Dey	Médéa
14:30	Baâli 77'	Report	Banouh 44'; Chouiter 49'	Stadium: Stade Imam Lyes; Referee: Akram Mechairia

14 January 2022 Round 13	RC Arbaâ	4–2	Olympique de Médéa	Larbaâ
15:00	Deghmani 7'; Berkoun 17'; Toumi Sief 85'; Boubakour 88'	Report	Messaoudène 26'; Baâli 82'	Stadium: Stade Ismaïl Makhlouf; Referee: Lotfi Bekouassa

21 January 2022 Round 14	Olympique de Médéa	0–3	JS Saoura	Médéa
15:00	Hamidi 30', 49'; Bellatreche 72'	Report		Stadium: Stade Imam Lyes; Referee: Abdellah Benchehida

25 January 2022 Round 15	US Biskra	2–1	Olympique de Médéa	Biskra
14:30	Ounnas 48'; Mokhtar 55'	Report	Belbey 90'	Stadium: Stade du 18 Février; Referee: Hadj Aissa semache

29 January 2022 Round 16	Olympique de Médéa	1–3	USM Alger	Médéa
14:30	Nehari 12'	Report	Mahious 10', 63'; Benhammouda 82'	Stadium: Imam Lyes Stadium; Referee: Nabil Boukhalfa

5 February 2022 Round 17	HB Chelghoum Laïd	2–0	Olympique de Médéa	Chelghoum Laïd
14:30	Hadji 45+2'; Kemoukh 57'	Report		Stadium: 11 December 1961 Stadium; Referee: Malek Ait Ameur

25 February 2022 Round 18	JS Kabylie	1–0	Olympique de Médéa	Tizi Ouzou
15:00	Mouaki 7'	Report		Stadium: Stade 1er Novembre 1954; Referee: Ali Nader

1 March 2022 Round 19	Olympique de Médéa	1–2	ASO Chlef	Médéa
15:00	Bellaouel 67'	Report	Dahmani 64'; Litt 89'	Stadium: Stade Imam Lyes; Referee: Amine Sekhraoui

5 March 2022 Round 20	MC Oran	0–1	Olympique de Médéa	Oran
13:30		Report	Gagaa 21' (pen.)	Stadium: Ahmed Zabana Stadium; Referee: Hamza Boucetta

7 April 2022 Round 21	Olympique de Médéa	0–0	CR Belouizdad	Médéa
16:45		Report		Stadium: Stade Imam Lyes; Referee: Abdelmoumen Touabti

19 March 2022 Round 22	NC Magra	2–0	Olympique de Médéa	Magra
15:00	Demane 48'; Kibboua 54'	Report		Stadium: Boucheligue Brothers Stadium; Referee: Akram Mechairia

26 March 2022 Round 23	Olympique de Médéa	1–0	WA Tlemcen	Médéa
15:00	Bouras 15'	Report		Stadium: Stade Imam Lyes; Referee: Youcef Gamouh

1 April 2022 Round 24	MC Alger	0–0	Olympique de Médéa	Algiers
16:30		Report		Stadium: Stade du 5 Juillet; Attendance: 0 (close doors); Referee: Abdelali Ibrir

12 April 2022 Round 25	Olympique de Médéa	2–1	CS Constantine	Médéa
16:45	Gagaa 49'; Baâli 66'	Report	Mebarakou 88' (pen.)	Stadium: Stade Imam Lyes; Referee: Lyés Bekouassa

16 April 2022 Round 26	Paradou AC	2–1	Olympique de Médéa	Bologhine
22:30	Nehari 31' (o.g.); Boulbina 90+1'	Report	Bellaouel 11'	Stadium: Omar Hamadi Stadium; Attendance: 0 (close doors); Referee: Abdellah Benchehida

22 April 2022 Round 27	Olympique de Médéa	2–0	RC Relizane	Médéa
15:45	Baâli 44'; Gagaa 87'	Report		Stadium: Stade Imam Lyes; Referee: Riadh Ammar Khodja

29 April 2022 Round 28	Olympique de Médéa	1–4	ES Sétif	Médéa
16:45	Mokrani 46'	Report	Bakrar 15'; Motrani 28', 67'; Benayad 80' (pen.)	Stadium: Stade Imam Lyes; Referee: Mohamed Saïdi

7 May 2022 Round 29	NA Hussein Dey	0–1	Olympique de Médéa	Belouizdad
17:00		Report	Bellaouel 88'	Stadium: Stade 20 Août 1955; Attendance: 0 (close doors); Referee: Bilal Bendjahene

14 May 2022 Round 30	Olympique de Médéa	4–3	RC Arbaâ	Médéa
17:00	Gagaa 31' (pen.); Baâli 39', 90+2'; Belouchat 88'	Report	Bouziane 50'; Boubakour 52'; Toumi Sief 79'	Stadium: Stade Imam Lyes; Referee: Lahlou Benbraham

21 May 2022 Round 31	JS Saoura	4–1	Olympique de Médéa	Béchar
19:00	Mellal 33'; Saâdi 52'; Omar Adrar 81', 86'	Report	Gagaâ 78' (pen.)	Stadium: Stade 20 Août 1955; Referee: Houssam Benyahia

27 May 2022 Round 32	Olympique de Médéa	1–1	US Biskra	Médéa
17:45	Baâli 55'	Report	Ounnas 13'	Stadium: Stade Imam Lyes; Referee: Zakaria Antar

3 June 2022 Round 33	USM Alger	4–0	Olympique de Médéa	Bologhine
16:45	Belkacemi 21'; Othmani 45'; Merbah 55'; Alilet 73'	Report		Stadium: Omar Hamadi Stadium; Attendance: 0 (close doors); Referee: Lamia Athmane

10 June 2022 Round 34	Olympique de Médéa	3–3	HB Chelghoum Laïd	Médéa
17:45	Laidouni 13'; Bouras 51'; Attallah 53'	Report	Demane 29', 90+1'; Harrari 87'	Stadium: Stade Imam Lyes; Referee: Hamlaoui Brahim

== Squad information ==
=== Playing statistics ===
No.	Pos	Nat	Player	Total		Ligue 1	
No.	Pos	Nat	Player	Apps	Goals	Apps	Goals
1	GK	(Algeria) ALG	Wassim Mimoune	2	0	2	0
16	GK	(Algeria) ALG	Mohamed Lotfi Anis Osmani	9	0	9	0
20	GK	(Algeria) ALG	Said Daas	20	0	20	0
	GK	(Algeria) ALG	Sid Ahmed Hammou	3	0	3	0
2	DF	(Algeria) ALG	Rabah Aït Kaci	2	0	2	0
3	DF	(Algeria) ALG	Abderrahmane Nehari	24	3	24	3
4	DF	(Algeria) ALG	Adnene Ladjabi	19	0	19	0
7	DF	(Algeria) ALG	Mohamed Nâas Araba	16	0	16	0
12	DF	(Algeria) ALG	Oussama Kaddour	19	0	19	0
14	DF	(Algeria) ALG	Mehdi Messaoudène	24	1	24	1
21	DF	(Algeria) ALG	Amir Laidouni	23	1	23	1
26	DF	(Algeria) ALG	Mohamed Benahmed	10	0	10	0
	DF	(Algeria) ALG	Moncef Marouani	9	0	9	0
5	MF	(Algeria) ALG	Omar Boudoumi	0	0	0	0
6	MF	(Algeria) ALG	Mohamed Djahli	0	0	0	0
8	MF	(Algeria) ALG	Ilyes Sidhoum	25	0	25	0
11	MF	(Algeria) ALG	Tarek Belouchat	27	1	27	1
13	MF	(Algeria) ALG	Houssameddine Bouras	16	2	16	2
17	MF	(Algeria) ALG	Ibrahim Benallal	0	0	0	0
18	MF	(Algeria) ALG	Riad Gharrich	28	0	28	0
19	MF	(Algeria) ALG	Ahmed Gagaa	29	5	29	5
22	MF	(Algeria) ALG	Louanes Mokrani	12	1	12	1
25	MF	(Algeria) ALG	Youcef Bechou	0	0	0	0
	MF	(Algeria) ALG	Laïd Chahine Bellaouel	20	3	20	3
9	FW	(Algeria) ALG	Mohamed El Siddik Baâli	30	10	30	10
10	FW	(Algeria) ALG	Khalil Semahi	19	0	19	0
15	FW	(Algeria) ALG	Khier-Anes Belaid	8	0	8	0
23	FW	(Algeria) ALG	Sid Ali Lakroum	10	3	10	3
24	FW	(Algeria) ALG	Yasser Berbache	14	1	14	1
27	FW	(Algeria) ALG	Walid Lakroum	5	0	5	0
	FW	(Algeria) ALG	Mohamed Sahmadi	13	0	13	0
Players transferred out during the season

Last updated: 10 June 2022
Source: fr.soccerway.com

=== Goalscorers ===
Includes all competitive matches. The list is sorted alphabetically by surname when total goals are equal.

No.	Nat.	Player	Pos.	L 1	TOTAL
9	(Algeria)	Mohamed El Siddik Baâli	FW	10	10
3	(Algeria)	Abderrahmane Nehari	DF	3	3
19	(Algeria)	Ahmed Gagaa	MF	5	5
	(Algeria)	Laïd Chahine Bellaouel	MF	3	3
23	(Algeria)	Sid Ali Lakroum	FW	3	3
13	(Algeria)	Houssameddine Bouras	MF	2	2
14	(Algeria)	Mehdi Messaoudène	DF	1	1
21	(Algeria)	Amir Laidouni	DF	1	1
11	(Algeria)	Tarek Belouchat	MF	1	1
22	(Algeria)	Louanes Mokrani	MF	1	1
24	(Algeria)	Yasser Berbache	FW	1	1
Own Goals				0	0
Totals				33	33

== Transfers ==
=== In ===
Date	Pos	Player	From club	Transfer fee	Source
14 September 2021	LB	(Algeria) Moncef Merouani	ES Sétif	Free transfer	
14 September 2021	FW	(Algeria) Aymen Belbey	ES Sétif	Free transfer	
14 September 2021	CB	(Algeria) Chahine Belloul	ES Sétif	Free transfer	
14 September 2021	MF	(Algeria) Mohamed Djahli	ES Sétif	Free transfer	
16 September 2021	FW	(Algeria) Yasser Berbache	ES Sétif	Free transfer	
16 September 2021	GK	(Algeria) Said Daas	ES Sétif	Free transfer	
16 September 2021	FW	(Algeria) Sid Ali Lakroum	(Qatar) Al-Markhiya	Free transfer	
20 September 2021	GK	(Algeria) Mohamed Lotfi Anis Osmani	CS Constantine	Free transfer	
20 September 2021	LB	(Algeria) Oussama Kaddour	JS Saoura	Free transfer	
20 September 2021	MF	(Algeria) Ilyes Sidhoum	NA Hussein Dey	Free transfer	
20 September 2021	CB	(Algeria) Mourad Bendjelloul	ASM Oran	Free transfer	
20 September 2021	FW	(Algeria) Houssam Bouras	ASM Oran	Free transfer	
21 September 2021	MF	(Algeria) Ahmed Gagaâ	CA Bordj Bou Arréridj	Free transfer	
21 September 2021	CB	(Algeria) Rabah Aït Kaci	CRB Dar Beida	Free transfer	
22 September 2021	MF	(Algeria) Khalil Semahi	USM Bel Abbès	Free transfer	
23 September 2021	RB	(Algeria) Amir Laidouni	ES Sétif	Free transfer	
24 September 2021	CB	(Algeria) Abderrahmane Nehari	ASO Chlef	Free transfer	
24 September 2021	GK	(Algeria) Wassim Mimoune	NA Hussein Dey	Free transfer	
28 September 2021	MF	(Algeria) Youcef Bechou	CR Belouizdad	One-year loan	
5 October 2021	FW	(Algeria) Khier-Anes Belaïd	ES Sétif	Free transfer	

=== Out ===
Date	Pos	Player	To club	Transfer fee	Source
9 September 2021	GK	(Algeria) Abderrahmane Medjadel	Paradou AC	Undisclosed	
15 September 2021	LB	(Algeria) Abdelhak Belkacemi	HB Chelghoum Laïd	Free transfer	
15 September 2021	GK	(Algeria) Fetheddine Alaoui	HB Chelghoum Laïd	Free transfer	
27 September 2021	FW	(Algeria) Tawfiq Elghomari	USM Annaba	Free transfer	
29 September 2021	RB	(Algeria) Hamza Rebai	CS Constantine	Free transfer	
7 October 2021	MF	(Algeria) Zakaria Kemoukh	HB Chelghoum Laïd	Free transfer	
13 October 2021	CB	(Algeria) Tarek Cheurfaoui	HB Chelghoum Laïd	Free transfer	
20 October 2021	FW	(Algeria) Bouzid Dadache	Olympique de Médéa	Free transfer	
6 January 2022	FW	(Algeria) Sid Ali Lakroum	(Saudi Arabia) Al-Qaisumah	Free transfer	
