= 2019–20 ES Sétif season =

ES Sétif
2019–20 season
- Chairman: Fahd Halfaya (from 8 September 2019)
- Head coach: Kheirredine Madoui (from 22 July 2019) (until 12 October 2019); Nabil Kouki (from 26 October 2019)
- Stadium: Stade 8 Mai 1945
- Ligue 1: Pre-season
- Algerian Cup: Quarter-finals
- Top goalscorer: League: Houssam Ghacha (7 goals); All: Houssam Ghacha (8 goals)
Home colours	Away colours

In the 2019–20 season, ES Sétif icompeted in Ligue 1 for the 50th season. It was their 24th consecutive season in the top flight of Algerian football. On March 15, 2020, the Ligue de Football Professionnel (LFP) decided to halt the season due to the COVID-19 pandemic in Algeria. On July 29, 2020, the LFP declared that season is over and CR Belouizdad to be the champion, the promotion of four teams from the League 2, and scraping the relegation for the current season.

== Squad list ==
Players and squad numbers last updated on 18 November 2010.
Note: Flags indicate national team as has been defined under FIFA eligibility rules. Players may hold more than one non-FIFA nationality.

No.	Nat.	Position	Name	Date of birth (age)	Signed from
Goalkeepers
Defenders
Midfielders
Forwards

== Mid-season ==
17 January 2020 Friendly	ES Sétif (Algeria)	0–2	(Ecuador) Emelec	La Nucia, Spain
12:00 CET (UTC+1)		Report	Rojas 7' (pen.); Godoy 78'	Stadium: Stade Olímpico Camilo Cano
Note: Lineup for ES Sétif - Khedairia, Debbari, Laouafi, Bekakchi, Laaribi, Kendoussi, Karaoui, Draoui, Djahnit, Touré, Ghacha

24 January 2020 Friendly	ES Sétif (Algeria)	1–0	(Romania) CFR Cluj	Oliva, Spain
16:00 CET (UTC+1)	Kendoussi 72'	Report		Stadium: Oliva Nova Golf & Beach Resort
Note: Lineup for ES Sétif - Khedairia, Debbari, Laouafi, Bekakchi, Laaribi, Kendoussi, Karaoui, Draoui, Djahnit, Ghacha, Saïdi

== Competitions ==
=== Overview ===
Competition	Record								Started round	Final position / round	First match	Last match
Competition	G	W	D	L	GF	GA	GD	Win %	Started round	Final position / round	First match	Last match
Ligue 1	22	11	4	7	34	19	+15	50.00	—N/a	3rd	15 August 2019	15 March 2020
Algerian Cup	4	2	2	0	10	5	+5	50.00	Round of 64	Canceled	26 December 2019	10 March 2020
Total	26	13	6	7	44	24	+20	50.00				

Updated to match played 3 June 2019
Source: Competitions

== League table ==
Pos	Team	Pld	W	D	L	GF	GA	GD	Pts	PPG	Qualification or relegation
1	CR Belouizdad (C)	21	11	7	3	30	16	+14	40	1.90	Qualification for Champions League
2	MC Alger	21	11	4	6	31	25	+6	37	1.76	Qualification for Champions League
3	ES Sétif	22	11	4	7	34	19	+15	37	1.68	Qualification for Confederation Cup
4	JS Kabylie	22	10	6	6	27	18	+9	36	1.64	Qualification for Confederation Cup
5	CS Constantine	22	9	7	6	32	23	+9	34	1.55	

Updated to match(es) played on 15 March 2020. Source: dzfoot.com
Rules for classification: 1) points; 2) head-to-head points; 3) head-to-head goal difference; 4) goal difference; 5) total goals; 6) fairplay ranking; 7) playoff.
(C) Champions

=== Results summary ===
Overall								Home						Away					
Pld	W	D	L	GF	GA	GD	Pts	W	D	L	GF	GA	GD	W	D	L	GF	GA	GD
0	0	0	0	0	0	0	0	0	0	0	0	0	0	0	0	0	0	0	0

Last updated: 22 April 2018.
Source: Competitive matches

=== Results by round ===
Round	1	2	3	4	5	6	7	8	9	10	11	12	13	14	15	16	17	18	19	20	21	22	23	24	25	26	27	28	29	30
Ground	A	H	A	H	A	H	A	H	A	H	A	A	H	A	H	H	A	H	A	H	A	H	A	H	A	H	H	A	H	A
Result	L	D	L	W	L	W	L	L	L	W	D	L	W	W	W	W	D	W	W	W	W	D								
Position	12	12	12	10	13	8	13	13	16	11	13	15	11	11	7	5	5	4	4	3										

Updated to match(es) played on 22 April 2019. Source: Competitive matches
A = Away; H = Home; W = Win; D = Draw; L = Loss

=== Matches ===
Win Draw Loss

15 August 2019 Round 1	USM Alger	2–1	ES Sétif	Bologhine
20:00	Meftah 45+3'; Khemaissia 90+4'	Soccerway report	Bouguelmouna 34'	Stadium: Omar Hamadi Stadium; Attendance: 0 (close doors); Referee: Mustapha Ghorbal

24 August 2019 Round 2	ES Sétif	1–1	MC Oran	Sétif
21:00	Radouani 70' (pen.)	Soccerway report	Motrani 48'	Stadium: Stade 8 Mai 1945; Referee: Lotfi Bekouassa

31 August 2019 Round 3	CA Bordj Bou Arreridj	1–0	ES Sétif	Bordj Bou Arréridj
20:30	Guessan 78'	Soccerway report		Stadium: August 20, 1955 Stadium; Referee: Redouane Necib

12 September 2019 Round 4	ES Sétif	3–0	NC Magra	Sétif
19:00	Deghmoum 26'; Djahnit 45+1'; Ghacha 76'	Soccerway report		Stadium: Stade 8 Mai 1945; Referee: Ahmed Bouzrar

23 September 2019 Round 5	NA Hussein Dey	4–3	ES Sétif	Bologhine (Note: NA Hussein Dey played their home match against ES Sétif at Omar Hamadi Stadium, Bologhine, instead of their regular stadium Stade 20 Août 1955, Belouizdad, due to renovation.)
17:00	Zerdoum 4', 20', 65'; Boutmene 18'	Soccerway report	Souibaâh 46', 53'; Laribi 48'	Stadium: Omar Hamadi Stadium; Referee: Bilal Bendjahene

28 September 2019 Round 6	ES Sétif	2–0	US Biskra	Sétif
18:45	Souibaâh 2'; Saïdi 46'	Soccerway report		Stadium: Stade 8 Mai 1945; Referee: Yazid Ibrir

6 October 2019 Round 7	JS Kabylie	1–0	ES Sétif	Bologhine (Note: JS Kabylie played two matches instead of their regular stadium Stade 1er Novembre 1954, Tizi Ouzou, due to sanctions.)
17:45	Oukaci 80'	Soccerway report		Stadium: Omar Hamadi Stadium; Attendance: 0 (close doors); Referee: Mustapha Ghorbal

23 October 2019 Round 8	ES Sétif	0–1	ASO Chlef	Sétif
18:00		Soccerway report	Tahar 16'	Stadium: Stade 8 Mai 1945; Referee: Houssam Benyahia

30 October 2019 Round 9	CR Belouizdad	1–0	ES Sétif	Belouizdad
16:00	Bekakchi 90+6' (o.g.)	Soccerway report		Stadium: Stade 20 Août 1955; Referee: Nabil Boukhalfa

9 November 2019 Round 10	ES Sétif	2–1	USM Bel Abbès	Sétif
18:00	Bouguelmouna 69'; Ghacha 89'	Soccerway report	Bouguettaya 90'	Stadium: Stade 8 Mai 1945; Referee: Hamza Bouslimani

23 November 2019 Round 11	Paradou AC	1–1	ES Sétif	Bologhine
18:45	Messiad 84'	Soccerway report	Radouani 14' (pen.)	Stadium: Omar Hamadi Stadium; Referee: Mustapha Bessiri

30 November 2019 Round 12	CS Constantine	3–1	ES Sétif	Constantine
18:45	Abid 37' (pen.), 58'; Amokrane 48'	Soccerway report	Belaïd 56'	Stadium: Stade Mohamed Hamlaoui; Referee: Mustapha Ghorbal

7 December 2019 Round 13	ES Sétif	4–0	AS Aïn M'lila	Sétif
15:00	Touré 23', 32'; Djahnit 45'; Ghacha 85'	Soccerway report		Stadium: Stade 8 Mai 1945; Attendance: 0 (close doors); Referee: Malek Ait Ameur

21 December 2019 Round 15	ES Sétif	2–0	JS Saoura	Sétif
16:00	Ghacha 38'; Touré 42'	Soccerway report		Stadium: Stade 8 Mai 1945; Referee: Lyés Bekouassa

9 January 2020 Round 14	MC Alger	1–2	ES Sétif	Bologhine
17:00	Frioui 31'	Soccerway report	Kendoussi 40'; Boussouf 50'	Stadium: Omar Hamadi Stadium; Referee: Ahmed Bouzrar

4 February 2020 Round 16	ES Sétif	3–1	USM Alger	Sétif
17:00	Laribi 45+1'; Ghacha 56'; Kendoussi 58'	Soccerway report	Zouari 90+4'	Stadium: Stade 8 Mai 1945; Referee: Nabil Boukhalfa

8 February 2020 Round 17	MC Oran	1–1	ES Sétif	Oran
17:45	Boutiche 64'	Soccerway report	Djahnit 50' (pen.)	Stadium: Ahmed Zabana Stadium; Referee: Hamza Bouslimani

17 February 2020 Round 18	ES Sétif	3–0	CA Bordj Bou Arreridj	Sétif
16:00	Saïdi 9'; Draoui 44'; Amoura 90+2'	Soccerway report		Stadium: Stade 8 Mai 1945; Referee: Mehdi Abid Charef

22 February 2020 Round 19	NC Magra	0–1	ES Sétif	Ras El Oued
15:00		Soccerway report	Bekakchi 38'	Stadium: Stade Martyr Al Taher Qidum; Referee: Lahlou Benbraham

29 February 2020 Round 20	ES Sétif	2–0	NA Hussein Dey	Sétif
17:00	Laouafi 55'; Berbache 76'	Soccerway report		Stadium: Stade 8 Mai 1945; Referee: Mohamed Saïdi

5 March 2020 Round 21	US Biskra	0–2	ES Sétif	Biskra
15:00		Soccerway report	Karaoui 45+2'; Ghacha 73'	Stadium: Stade du 18 Février; Referee: Said Aouina

15 March 2020 Round 22	ES Sétif	0–0	JS Kabylie	Sétif
17:00		Soccerway report		Stadium: Stade 8 Mai 1945; Attendance: 0 (close doors); Referee: Hamza Bouslimani
Note: due to coronavirus outbreak, Ministry of Health, Population and Hospital Reform decided to be all matches played behind closed doors.

Round 23	ASO Chlef	Cancelled	ES Sétif	Chlef
				Stadium: Stade Mohamed Boumezrag

Round 24	ES Sétif	Cancelled	CR Belouizdad	Sétif
				Stadium: Stade 8 Mai 1945

Round 25	USM Bel Abbès	Cancelled	ES Sétif	Sidi Bel Abbès
				Stadium: Stade 24 Fevrier 1956

Round 26	ES Sétif	Cancelled	Paradou AC	Sétif
				Stadium: Stade 8 Mai 1945

Round 27	ES Sétif	Cancelled	CS Constantine	Sétif
				Stadium: Stade 8 Mai 1945

Round 28	AS Aïn M'lila	Cancelled	ES Sétif	Aïn M'lila
				Stadium: Touhami Zoubir Khelifi Stadium

Round 29	ES Sétif	Cancelled	MC Alger	Sétif
				Stadium: Stade 8 Mai 1945

Round 30	JS Saoura	Cancelled	ES Sétif	Béchar
				Stadium: Stade 20 Août 1955

== Algerian Cup ==
26 December 2019 Round of 64	JSM Béjaïa	2–2 (a.e.t.) (7–8 p)	ES Sétif	Béjaïa
18:45	Youcef 38'; Khedairia 42' (o.g.)	Report	Kendoussi 32'; Touré 60'	Stadium: Maghrebi Unity Stadium; Referee: Houssam Benyahia
Note: Lineup for ES Sétif - Khedairia, Radouani, Bekakchi, Laouafi, Laribi, Karaoui, Djahnit, Ghacha, Kendoussi, Draoui (Berbache 109’), Touré (Saïdi 60’)

4 January 2020 Round of 32	AB Chelghoum Laïd	1–5	ES Sétif	Chelghoum Laïd
14:00	Benmarzoug 90+1' (pen.)		Kendoussi 26'; Touré 42', 72'; Ghacha 53'; Djahnit 62' (pen.)	Stadium: Stade 11 Décembre 1961; Referee: Bahloul, Saadi, Guessoum
Note: Lineup for ES Sétif - Daas, Radouani (Debbari 61’), Laribi, Laouafi, Bekakchi, Draoui, Kendoussi, Karaoui (Saïdi 65’), Djahnit, Ghacha, Touré (Boussouf 73’)

13 February 2020 Round of 16	ES Sétif	2–1	CS Constantine	Sétif
18:45	Touré 47'; Boussouf 83'	Report	Benayada 40'	Stadium: Stade 8 Mai 1945; Referee: Lyés Bekouassa
Note: Lineup for ES Sétif - Khedairia, Debbari, Bekakchi, Laouafi, Laribi, Karaoui, Djahnit, Touré (Nemdil 84’), Kendoussi, Ghacha (Biaz 90’), Boussouf (Draoui 88’)

10 March 2020 QF 1st leg	CA Bordj Bou Arreridj	1–1	ES Sétif	Bordj Bou Arreridj
16:00	Yousif 90+5'	Soccerway report	Touré 66'	Stadium: August 20, 1955 Stadium; Referee: Mohamed Boutaraa

21 March 2020 QF 2nd leg	ES Sétif	Cancelled	CA Bordj Bou Arreridj	Sétif
TBD		Soccerway report		Stadium: Stade 8 Mai 1945

== Squad information ==
=== Playing statistics ===
No.	Pos	Nat	Player	Total		Ligue 1		Algerian Cup	
No.	Pos	Nat	Player	Apps	Goals	Apps	Goals	Apps	Goals
Goalkeepers
1	GK	(Algeria) ALG	Sofiane Khedairia	21	0	18	0	3	0
30	GK	(Algeria) ALG	Oussama Filali	1	0	1	0	0	0
50	GK	(Algeria) ALG	Said Daas	4	0	3	0	1	0
Defenders
8	DF	(Algeria) ALG	Houari Ferhani	1	0	1	0	0	0
13	DF	(Algeria) ALG	Abdelkrim Nemdil	18	0	16	0	2	0
18	DF	(Algeria) ALG	Hocine Laribi	24	2	20	2	4	0
19	DF	(Algeria) ALG	Saâdi Radouani	19	2	16	2	3	0
20	DF	(Algeria) ALG	Abdelhak Debbari	14	0	11	0	3	0
22	DF	(Algeria) ALG	Ibrahim Bekakchi	26	1	22	1	4	0
29	DF	(Algeria) ALG	Youcef Laouafi	16	1	12	1	4	0
	DF	(Algeria) ALG	Mohamed Benyahia	0	0	0	0	0	0
	FW	(Algeria) ALG	Amine Biaz	4	0	3	0	1	0
Midfielders
7	MF	(Algeria) ALG	Akram Djahnit	22	4	18	3	4	1
11	MF	(Algeria) ALG	Zakaria Draoui	25	1	21	1	4	0
12	MF	(Algeria) ALG	Hadil Cherama	0	0	0	0	0	0
14	MF	(Algeria) ALG	Amir Karaoui	20	1	16	1	4	0
15	MF	(Algeria) ALG	Abderrahim Deghmoum	16	1	16	1	0	0
21	MF	(Algeria) ALG	Mohamed Djahli	0	0	0	0	0	0
28	MF	(Algeria) ALG	Wail Harikeche	0	0	0	0	0	0
43	MF	(Algeria) ALG	Ahmed Kendoussi	17	4	13	2	4	2
Forwards
9	FW	(Algeria) ALG	Habib Bouguelmouna	7	2	7	2	0	0
10	FW	(Mali) MLI	Malick Touré	22	8	18	3	4	5
23	FW	(Algeria) ALG	Salaheddine Rahba	0	0	0	0	0	0
24	FW	(Algeria) ALG	Ismaïl Saïdi	20	2	18	2	2	0
26	FW	(Algeria) ALG	Yasser Berbache	8	1	6	1	2	0
27	FW	(Algeria) ALG	Houssam Ghacha	22	8	18	7	4	1
	FW	(Algeria) ALG	Ishak Talal Boussouf	10	2	8	1	2	1
Players transferred out during the season
6	MF	(Algeria) ALG	Ilyes Sidhoum	2	0	2	0	0	0
16	MF	(Algeria) ALG	Oussama Tebbi	6	0	6	0	0	0
25	FW	(Algeria) ALG	Mohamed Souibaâh	9	3	9	3	0	0

Last updated: 11 June 2018
Source: fr.soccerway.com

=== Goalscorers ===
Includes all competitive matches. The list is sorted alphabetically by surname when total goals are equal.

No.	Nat.	Player	Pos.	L 1	AC	TOTAL
27	(Algeria)	Houssam Ghacha	FW	7	1	8
10	(Mali)	Malick Touré	FW	3	5	8
7	(Algeria)	Akram Djahnit	MF	3	1	4
43	(Algeria)	Ahmed Kendoussi	MF	2	2	4
25	(Algeria)	Mohamed Souibaâh	FW	3	0	3
9	(Algeria)	Habib Bouguelmouna	FW	2	0	2
24	(Algeria)	Ismaïl Saïdi	FW	2	0	2
	(Algeria)	Ishak Talal Boussouf	FW	1	1	2
18	(Algeria)	Hocine Laribi	DF	2	0	2
19	(Algeria)	Saâdi Radouani	DF	2	0	2
26	(Algeria)	Yasser Berbache	FW	1	0	1
11	(Algeria)	Zakaria Draoui	MF	1	0	1
14	(Algeria)	Amir Karaoui	MF	1	0	1
15	(Algeria)	Abderrahim Deghmoum	MF	1	0	1
22	(Algeria)	Ibrahim Bekakchi	DF	1	0	1
29	(Algeria)	Youcef Laouafi	DF	1	0	1
Own Goals				0	0	0
Totals				34	10	44

== Squad list ==
As of 15 August 2019. Note: Flags indicate national team as defined under FIFA eligibility rules; some limited exceptions apply. Players may hold more than one non-FIFA nationality.

No.	Pos.	Nation	Player
1	GK	ALG	Sofiane Khedairia
6	MF	ALG	Ilyes Sidhoum
7	MF	ALG	Akram Djahnit (captain)
8	DF	ALG	Houari Ferhani
9	FW	ALG	Habib Bouguelmouna
10	FW	MLI	Malick Touré
11	MF	ALG	Zakaria Draoui
12	MF	ALG	Hadil Cherama
13	DF	ALG	Abdelkrim Nemdil
14	MF	ALG	Amir Karaoui
15	MF	ALG	Abderrahim Deghmoum
17	MF	ALG	Oussama Tebbi
18	DF	ALG	Hocine Laribi

No.	Pos.	Nation	Player
19	DF	ALG	Saâdi Radouani
20	DF	ALG	Abdelhak Debbari
21	MF	ALG	Mohamed Djahli
22	DF	ALG	Ibrahim Bekakchi
23	FW	ALG	Salaheddine Rahba
24	FW	ALG	Ismaïl Saïdi
25	FW	ALG	Mohamed Souibaâh
26	FW	ALG	Yasser Berbache
27	FW	ALG	Houssam Ghacha
28	MF	ALG	Wail Harikeche
29	DF	ALG	Youcef Laouafi
30	GK	ALG	Oussama Filali
50	GK	ALG	Said Daas

== Transfers ==
=== In ===
Date	Pos	Player	from club	Transfer fee	Source
20 June 2019	FW	(Algeria) Oussama Tebbi	MC Alger	Free transfer	
20 June 2019	FW	(Algeria) Mohamed Souibaâh	MC Alger	Free transfer	
20 June 2019	DF	(Algeria) Abdelghani Khiat	NA Hussein Dey	Free transfer	
10 July 2019	MF	(Algeria) Hocine Laribi	NA Hussein Dey	Free transfer	
10 July 2019	DF	(Algeria) Abdelhak Debbari	MO Béjaïa	Free transfer	
16 July 2019	MF	(Mali) Malick Touré	MO Béjaïa	Free transfer	
25 July 2019	GK	(Algeria) Sofiane Khedairia	USM Bel Abbès	Free transfer	
26 July 2019	DF	(Algeria) Ibrahim Bekakchi	JS Saoura	Free transfer	
26 December 2019	DF	(Algeria) Mohamed Benyahia	Unattached	Free transfer	

=== Out ===
Date	Pos	Player	To club	Transfer fee	Source
7 June 2019	FW	(Algeria) Hamza Banouh	JS Kabylie	Free transfer	
15 June 2019	MF	(Algeria) Abdelmoumene Djabou	MC Alger	Free transfer	
24 June 2019	MF	(Algeria) Samir Aiboud	CR Belouizdad	Free transfer	
4 July 2019	GK	(Algeria) Moustapha Zeghba	(Saudi Arabia) Al-Wehda	Free transfer	
29 June 2019	DF	(Algeria) Abdelkader Bedrane	(Tunisia) Espérance ST	Free transfer	
2 July 2019	MF	(Algeria) Mohamed Islam Bakir	(Tunisia) CS Sfaxien	Free transfer	
9 July 2019	DF	(Algeria) Aïssa Boudechicha	(France) Girondins de Bordeaux	€50,000	
22 July 2019	DF	(Algeria) Miloud Rebiai	MC Alger	40,000,000 DA	
6 January 2020	FW	(Algeria) Mohamed Souibaâh	CR Belouizdad	Free transfer (Released)	
17 January 2020	MF	(Algeria) Ilyes Sidhoum	NA Hussein Dey	Free transfer	
21 January 2020	FW	(Algeria) Oussama Tebbi	AS Ain M'lila	Free transfer (Released)	
