= Billel Abdelkadous =

French footballer (born 1990)

Personal information
- Date of birth: 22 May 1990 (age 36)
- Place of birth: Metz, France
- Height: 1.92 m (6 ft 4 in)
- Positions: Midfielder; winger

Team information
- Current team: Mondorf
- Number: 22

Senior career*
Years	Team	Apps	(Gls)
- Amnéville
- Reims B
2010–2011	Amnéville	22	(3)
2011–2012	BX Brussels	27	(5)
2012–2013	Virton	34	(5)
2013–2014	RC Arbaâ	22	(2)
2014	Vereya	2	(0)
- Amnéville
2016–2017	Shabab Urdun		
2017–2018	Amnéville	22	(15)
2018–2019	Épinal	27	(5)
2019–2021	Amnéville	23	(8)
2021–	Mondorf	108	(27)
- * Club domestic league appearances and goals as of 20 October 2025

Billel Abdelkadous (born 22 May 1990) is a French footballer who plays as a midfielder or winger for Mondorf.

== Career ==
Abdelkadous started his career with French side Amnéville. In 2011, he signed for BX Brussels in Belgium. In 2013, Abdelkadous signed for Algerian club RC Arbaâ, where he made 22 league appearances and scored 2 goals. On 24 August 2013, he debuted for RCA during a 1–0 loss to CRB. On 3 September 2013, Abdelkadous scored his first goal for RCA during a 2–1 win over USMH.

In 2014, he signed for Vereya in Bulgaria. In 2016, Abdelkadous signed for Jordanian team Shabab Urdun. In 2017, he returned to Amnéville in the French fifth division. In 2018, he signed for French fourth division outfit Épinal. In 2019, Abdelkadous returned to Amnéville in the French fifth division. In 2021, he signed for Luxembourgish side Mondorf.
