= Samir Abbès =

French footballer (born 1990)

Personal information
- Date of birth: 6 March 1990 (age 36)
- Place of birth: France
- Positions: Midfielder; winger

Senior career*
Years	Team	Apps	(Gls)
2009–2011	OM B	43	(4)
2011–2012	Martigues	1	(0)
2012–2013	ES Pennoise	15	(3)
2013	RC Arbaâ	11	(0)

International career
- Provence
- * Club domestic league appearances and goals

Samir Abbès (born 6 March 1990) is a French former footballer who last played as a midfielder or winger for RC Arbaâ.

== Early life ==
As a youth player, Abbès joined the youth academy of French Ligue 1 side OM, helping the youth team win the league.

== Club career ==
Abbès started his career with French Ligue 1 side OM but was regarded to not have been in the plans of the club's manager Didier Deschamps. In 2011, he signed for French side Martigues. In 2013, he signed for Algerian side RC Arbaâ, where he was initially regarded as a consistent fixture in the club's starting lineup.

== International career ==
Abbès played for the Provence football team.

== Style of play ==
Abbes mainly operated as a midfielder or winger and was regarded as a playmaker. He is known for his explosive dribbling.

== Personal life ==
Abbès is of Algerian descent.
