= Miloš Galin =

Bosnian Herzegovina footballer

Personal information
- Date of birth: 22 April 1990 (age 36)
- Place of birth: Bihać, SFR Yugoslavia
- Height: 1.98 m (6 ft 6 in)
- Position: Striker

Senior career*
Years	Team	Apps	(Gls)
2007–2008	Jedinstvo Bihać		
2009–2011	Rad		
2009	→ OFK Mladenovac (loan)		
2010	→ Donji Srem (loan)		
2011	→ Drina Zvornik (loan)	3	(0)
2011	Jedinstvo Bihać		
2012	Bratstvo Gračanica		
2013	Kalamata	9	(0)
2013	Sloboda Tuzla		
2015	CR Belouizdad	6	(1)
2016	Nara United	10	(6)
2016	Udon Thani	4	(0)
2016–2017	Sliema Wanderers	10	(0)
2017	Jedinstvo Bihać		
2018	Shabab Sahel		
2018–2019	Jedinstvo Bihać		
2019	Lichtenauer FV	3	(7)
2019–2020	CSC 03 Kassel	7	(3)
2020	Jedinstvo Bihać		
2020	Sloboda Novi Grad		
- * Club domestic league appearances and goals as of 12 December 2016

Miloš Galin (born 22 April 1990) is a Bosnia Herzegovina professional footballer who plays as a striker.

== Career ==
In January 2015, Galin signed a two-year contract with Algerian Ligue Professionnelle 1 club CR Belouizdad. On 30 January, he made his debut for the club as a starter in a league match against USM Alger.

He later played for German lower league sides Lichtenauer FV and CSC 03 Kassel.
