= Zakaria Draoui =

Algerian footballer (born 1994)

Personal information
- Full name: Zakaria Draoui
- Date of birth: 20 February 1994 (age 32)
- Place of birth: Hussein Dey, Algeria
- Height: 1.65 m (5 ft 5 in)
- Position: Midfielder

Team information
- Current team: USM Alger
- Number: 6

Senior career*
| Years | Team | Apps | (Gls) |
| 2013–2014 | RC Kouba | | |
| 2014–2018 | CR Belouizdad | 108 | (9) |
| 2018–2020 | ES Sétif | 49 | (2) |
| 2020–2023 | CR Belouizdad | 77 | (3) |
| 2023–2024 | Wydad AC | 20 | (2) |
| 2024–2025 | MC Alger | 15 | (1) |
| 2025– | USM Alger | 24 | (4) |

International career^{‡}
| 2014–2016 | Algeria U23 | 10 | (1) |
| 2021–2025 | Algeria A' | 18 | (0) |
| 2021– | Algeria | 21 | (0) |
Medal record
Men's football
Representing Algeria
FIFA Arab Cup
| Winner | 2021 Qatar |
- * Club domestic league appearances and goals as of 6 June 2026 ‡ National team caps and goals as of 18:00, December 1, 2021 (EST)

Zakaria Draoui (born February 20, 1994) is an Algerian professional footballer who plays as a midfielder for USM Alger.

== Career ==
On September 27, 2014, Draoui made his debut with CR Belouizdad as a starter in a league match against MC El Eulma.

In May 2018, Draoui joined ES Sétif. In August 2020, he returned to CR Belouizdad.

In July 2023, Draoui joined Wydad AC.

=== USM Alger ===
On 31 July 2025, USM Alger officially announced the signing of Zakaria Draoui on a two-year contract, the midfielder joined the club after spending the 2024–25 season with MC Alger. He had mutually terminated his contract with the club on 30 July 2025. Draoui completed his transfer on the eve of his departure for Kampala, Uganda, where he was due to join the Algeria A' national team for the 2024 African Nations Championship (CHAN). On 4 October 2025, Draoui scored his first goal since joining the club, opening the scoring in a 1–1 away draw against CS Constantine in the Ligue 1.

Draoui played a part in USM Alger's two title triumphs in 2025–26 season. Draoui won his first trophy with the club in the Algerian Cup final against his former side, CR Belouizdad, where he featured in the starting line-up as USM Alger claimed the title. Just two weeks later, he secured the first continental trophy of his career, as USM Alger defeated Zamalek in a penalty shoot-out (8–7) to win the CAF Confederation Cup, following a 1–1 draw on aggregate.

At the end of the season, several clubs expressed interest in signing Zakaria Draoui, including his former club CR Belouizdad, which sought to bring him back through a proposed swap deal involving former USM Alger player Abderaouf Benguit. However, On 23 August 2026, USM Alger extended Draoui's contract for three additional seasons as part of the club's efforts to retain key players and maintain squad stability, keeping him at the club until 2030. Draoui played a decisive role in the 2026 CAF Super Cup against Mamelodi Sundowns, held on 8 November 2026 in Pretoria. He opened the scoring for USM Alger, helping his side secure a 3–1 victory and claim the title. The triumph marked Draoui's second continental trophy with the club.

== International career ==
Zakaria Draoui was selected by national team coach Pierre-André Schürmann for Algeria’s squad for the 2016 Summer Olympics, held in Rio de Janeiro, Brazil. He was among the 18 players named for the football tournament, joining a squad that included three over-age players. Draoui made only one appearance in the tournament, coming on against Portugal in Algeria’s final group-stage match, which ended in a 1–1 draw. Algeria were subsequently eliminated in the group stage of the competition.

On 20 November 2021, Zakaria Draoui was called up by Madjid Bougherra to participate in the 2021 FIFA Arab Cup, held in Qatar. Draoui was among the five players from the Algerian league included in the final 23-man squad. The CR Belouizdad midfielder was one of the players regularly featured by Bougherra in the Algeria A' national team, alongside his club teammate Houssem Mrezigue. His selection reflected his consistent performances for the Algiers-based club and his importance in the national team's midfield. During the tournament, Draoui featured in all of Algeria's matches, although he started most of them on the bench. Nevertheless, he helped the national team win its first-ever FIFA Arab Cup title, following a 2–0 victory over Tunisia in the final.

On 2 January 2023, Zakaria Draoui was selected by Madjid Bougherra for Algeria A’s 28-man squad for the 2022 African Nations Championship (CHAN), held in Algeria. Draoui was one of nine CR Belouizdad players called up. Draoui featured in all of Algeria A's matches at the (CHAN), starting every game. He helped the team reach the final, where Algeria lost to Senegal on penalties after a goalless draw.

On 19 July 2025, Draoui was included in Madjid Bougherra's final 28-man squad for the 2024 African Nations Championship (CHAN), which was held in Kenya, Tanzania and Uganda. It marked his second participation in the competition, having previously represented Algeria in the 2022 edition. Once again, Draoui featured in all of Algeria's matches during the tournament. However, the Algerian A' national team suffered a shock quarter-final elimination after losing to Sudan in a penalty shootout.

== Career statistics ==
=== Club ===
As of 6 June 2026

| Club | Season | League | | | Cup | | Continental | | Other | | Total | |
| Club | Season | Division | Apps | Goals | Apps | Goals | Apps | Goals | Apps | Goals | Apps | Goals |
|---|---|---|---|---|---|---|---|---|---|---|---|---|
| CR Belouizdad | 2014–15 | Ligue 1 | 26 | 2 | 2 | 0 | — | | — | | 28 | 2 |
| CR Belouizdad | 2015–16 | Ligue 1 | 28 | 0 | 1 | 0 | — | | — | | 29 | 0 |
| CR Belouizdad | 2016–17 | Ligue 1 | 28 | 3 | 6 | 0 | — | | — | | 34 | 3 |
| CR Belouizdad | 2017–18 | Ligue 1 | 26 | 4 | 3 | 1 | 5 (Note: All appearance(s) in CAF Confederation Cup) | 1 | 1 (Note: All appearances in Algerian Super Cup) | 0 | 35 | 2 |
| CR Belouizdad | Total | | 108 | 9 | 12 | 1 | 5 | 1 | 1 | 0 | 126 | 5 |
| ES Sétif | 2018–19 | Ligue 1 | 28 | 1 | 7 | 0 | — | | — | | 35 | 1 |
| ES Sétif | 2019–20 | Ligue 1 | 21 | 1 | 4 | 0 | — | | — | | 25 | 1 |
| ES Sétif | Total | | 49 | 2 | 11 | 0 | — | | — | | 60 | 2 |
| CR Belouizdad | 2020–21 | Ligue 1 | 34 | 3 | — | | 11 (Note: All appearance(s) in Champions League) | 1 | 2 (Note: 1 appearance in Algerian League Cup, 1 appearance in Algerian Super Cup) | 0 | 0 | 0 |
| CR Belouizdad | 2021–22 | Ligue 1 | 21 | 0 | — | | 11 | 0 | — | | 32 | 0 |
| CR Belouizdad | 2022–23 | Ligue 1 | 22 | 0 | 1 | 0 | 11 | 1 | — | | 34 | 1 |
| CR Belouizdad | Total | | 77 | 3 | 1 | 0 | 33 | 2 | 2 | 0 | 113 | 5 |
| Wydad AC | 2023–24 | Botola | 28 | 2 | 1 | 0 | 14 (Note: 8 appearance and 1 goal in CAF Champions League, 6 appearances in African Football League) | 1 | 3 (Note: All appearances in Arab Club Champions Cup) | 0 | 46 | 3 |
| MC Alger | 2024–25 | Ligue 1 | 15 | 1 | 1 | 0 | 10 | 1 | 0 | 0 | 26 | 2 |
| USM Alger | 2025–26 | Ligue 1 | 24 | 4 | 3 | 0 | 14 | 2 | 1 | 0 | 42 | 6 |
| USM Alger | 2026–27 | Ligue 1 | 0 | 0 | 0 | 0 | 0 | 0 | 0 | 0 | 0 | 0 |
| USM Alger | Total | | 24 | 4 | 3 | 0 | 14 | 2 | 1 | 0 | 42 | 6 |
| Career total | | | 301 | 20 | 29 | 1 | 76 | 7 | 7 | 0 | 413 | 28 |

== Honours ==
Wydad AC

- African Football League runner-up: 2023

CR Belouizdad

- Algerian Ligue Professionnelle 1: 2020–21, 2021–22, 2022–23
- Algerian Cup: 2016–17
- Algerian Super Cup: 2019

MC Alger

- Algerian Ligue Professionnelle 1: 2024–25
- Algerian Super Cup: 2024

USM Alger

- Algerian Cup: 2025–26
- CAF Confederation Cup: 2025–26
- CAF Super Cup: 2026

Algeria

- FIFA Arab Cup: 2021
- African Nations Championship runner-up: 2023
