= Oussama Tebbi =

Algerian footballer (b. 1991)

Personal information
- Full name: Oussama Tebbi
- Date of birth: September 23, 1991 (age 35)
- Place of birth: Algiers, Algeria
- Position: Forward

Senior career*
Years	Team	Apps	(Gls)
–2016	JSM Skikda	23	(0)
2016–2018	RC Relizane	15	(3)
2018–2019	MC Alger	26	(0)
2019	ES Sétif	6	(0)
2020–2021	AS Aïn M'lila	9	(0)
2021–2022	JSM Skikda		
2022–2023	RC Kouba		
- * Club domestic league appearances and goals as of 27 August 2023

Oussama Tebbi (Arabic: أسامة تبي; born September 23, 1991) is an Algerian footballer.

== Career ==
In 2018, Tebbi joined MC Alger. In July 2019, he signed a contract with ES Sétif on a free transfer. In 2020, he joined AS Aïn M'lila.
