= Gilles Ngomo =

Cameroonian footballer

Gilles Ngomo Michée
Personal information
- Date of birth: 23 August 1987 (age 39)
- Place of birth: Yaoundé, Cameroon
- Height: 1.84 m (6 ft 0 in)
- Position: Midfielder

Youth career
- FS d'Akonolinga

Senior career*
Years	Team	Apps	(Gls)
2002–2008	Canon Yaoundé		
2008–2011	AS Khroub	87	(8)
2011–2014	CS Constantine	68	(2)
2014–2016	CR Belouizdad	56	(3)
2017	Al-Quwa Al-Jawiya	5	(0)
2017–2018	Alki Oroklini	22	(0)
2018–2019	Abha	26	(3)

International career^{‡}
2012	Cameroon	1	(0)
- * Club domestic league appearances and goals as of 10:36, 8 July 2018 (UTC) ‡ National team caps and goals as of 00:00, 31 December 2017

Gilles Ngomo Michée (born 23 August 1987) is a Cameroonian professional football who plays as a midfielder.

== Club career ==
Gil was born in Yaoundé, Cameroon.

=== AS Khroub ===
In June 2008 Gil joined AS Khroub.

=== CS Constantine ===
On 8 August 2011, Gil signed a two-year contract with Algerian club CS Constantine. On 10 September 2011, Gil made his debut for CS Constantine as a starter in a league match against JSM Bejaia. He played the entire match as CS Constantine won 0-0.

=== CR Belouizdad ===
In June 2014 Gil joined signed a two-year contract with Algerian club CR Belouizdad.
