= Sid Ali Lakroum =

Algerian footballer (born 1987)

Personal information
- Date of birth: 6 October 1987 (age 39)
- Height: 1.77 m (5 ft 10 in)
- Position: Forward

Team information
- Current team: ESM Koléa
- Number: 10

Senior career*
Years	Team	Apps	(Gls)
2014–2016	WA Boufarik		
2016–2018	CR Belouizdad	49	(8)
2018–2019	ES Sétif	12	(3)
2019	→ Al-Qaisumah (loan)		
2019–2021	Olympique de Médéa	26	(9)
2021	Al-Markhiya		
2021–2022	Olympique de Médéa	15	(3)
2022	Al-Qaisumah		
2022–2023	Al-Nahda		
2023–2024	NC Magra	8	(0)
2024	Al-Nairyah		
2024–2025	ESM Koléa		
2025	ES Ben Aknoun		
2025–	ESM Koléa	9	(0)

International career
2018	Algeria	1	(0)
- * Club domestic league appearances and goals as of 12:00, 23 November 2025 (UTC)

Sid Ali Lakroum (Arabic: سيد علي لعكروم; born 6 October 1987) is an Algerian professional footballer who plays as a forward for ESM Koléa. He made one appearance for the Algeria national team in 2018.

== Club career ==
Lakroum has played club football for WA Boufarik, CR Belouizdad, ES Sétif and Al-Qaisumah. In 2019 he signed for Olympique de Médéa. On 19 February 2021, he signed for Al-Markhiya. On 19 February 2021 he signed for Olympique de Médéa. He signed for Al-Qaisumah in January 2022. On 25 August 2022, Lakroum joined Saudi club Al-Nahda. In August 2023, he joined NC Magra. On 9 February 2024, Lakroum joined Saudi Second Division side Al-Nairyah.

In February 2025, he signed for ES Ben Aknoun. In August 2025, he returned to ESM Koléa.

== International career ==
Lakroum made one appearance for the Algeria national team in 2018.
