= Sofiane Khelili =

Algerian footballer (born 1989)

Personal information
- Full name: Sofiane Khelili
- Date of birth: December 9, 1989 (age 36)
- Place of birth: El Harrach, Algeria
- Height: 1.88 m (6 ft 2 in)
- Position: Centre back

Team information
- Current team: MO Constantine
- Number: 5

Youth career
- –2009: NA Hussein Dey

Senior career*
Years	Team	Apps	(Gls)
2009–2010	NA Hussein Dey	19	(0)
2010–2013	JS Kabylie	27	(0)
2013–2016	CR Belouizdad	77	(3)
2016	Al-Ettifaq	0	(0)
2017	JS Kabylie	3	(0)
2017–2018	USM El Harrach	24	(1)
2018–2019	JSM Skikda	8	(1)
2019–2020	US Ben Guerdane	2	(0)
2020–2021	NC Magra	23	(1)
2021–2022	Ohod	29	(0)
2022–2023	Al-Nasr		
2023	Al-Sharq		
2023–2024	Al-Qous		
2024–2025	Munief		
2025–	MO Constantine	13	(1)

International career
2010–	Algeria U23	7	(0)
2011	Algeria Military	?	(?)
Medal record
Representing Algeria
Men's Football
Gold medal – first place	Rio 2011	Team competition
- * Club domestic league appearances and goals as of 5 February 2026

Sofiane Khelili (born December 9, 1989) is an Algerian footballer who plays as a centre back for MO Constantine.

== Club career ==
On January 22, 2011, Khelili signed a three-year contract with JS Kabylie, joining them on a transfer from NA Hussein Dey. JS Kabylie paid a transfer fee of 6,000,000 Algerian dinars. On March 4, 2011, Khelili made his official debut for JS Kabylie in a 2010–11 Algerian Cup match against ES Mostaganem. Khelili came on as a substitute in the 89th minute as JS Kabylie won 1–0.

On 12 August 2021, Khelili joined Ohod.

On 11 January 2023, Khelili joined Al-Sharq.

On 31 July 2023, Khelili joined Al-Qous.

== International career ==
On October 1, 2008, Khelili was called up to the Algerian Under-23 National Team for the first time for a 5-day training camp in Algiers. He was a member of the Under-23 team that won the 2010 UNAF U-23 Tournament in Morocco. On November 16, 2011, he was selected as part of Algeria's squad for the 2011 CAF U-23 Championship in Morocco.

== Honours ==
- Won the Algerian Cup once with JS Kabylie in 2011
- Won the World Military Cup once with the Algerian National Military Team in 2011
