= Mohamed Derrag =

Algerian footballer (born 1985)

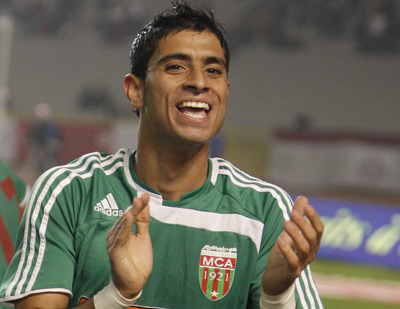

Personal information
- Full name: Mohamed Derrag
- Date of birth: 3 April 1985 (age 41)
- Place of birth: Algiers, Algeria
- Height: 1.80 m (5 ft 11 in)
- Position: Striker

Team information
- Current team: USM El Harrach
- Number: 11

Senior career*
Years	Team	Apps	(Gls)
2005–2007	OM Ruisseau	7	(1)
2007–2009	JS Kabylie	46	(6)
2009–2011	MC Alger	43	(9)
2011–2013	JSM Béjaïa	33	(4)
2013–2014	CS Constantine		
2014	RC Arbaâ		
2015–2017	CR Belouizdad		
2017–2020	RC Relizane		
2020–	USM El Harrach		

International career^{‡}
2010–	Algeria A'	4	(0)
- * Club domestic league appearances and goals as of 00:00, 26 May 2013 (UTC) ‡ National team caps and goals as of 00:00, 26 May 2013 (UTC)

Mohamed Derrag (born 3 April 1985) is an Algerian football player who plays as a forward for USM El Harrach in the Algerian Ligue 2. His main position is centre forward, and he can also play as a second striker or left winger.

== Honours ==
- Won the Algerian League twice:
  - Once with JS Kabylie in 2008
  - Once with MC Alger in 2010
