= Ilyes Sidhoum =

Algerian footballer (born 1989)

Personal information
- Full name: Ilyes Sidhoum
- Date of birth: August 10, 1989 (age 37)
- Place of birth: Nedroma, Tlemcen
- Height: 1.79 m (5 ft 10 1/2 in)
- Position: Midfielder

Team information
- Current team: Olympique de Médéa
- Number: 8

Youth career
- –2008: ASB Nedroma
- 2008–2009: WA Tlemcen

Senior career*
Years	Team	Apps	(Gls)
2009–2014	WA Tlemcen	96	(1)
2014–2015	CR Belouizdad	13	(0)
2015–2017	USM Bel-Abbès	–	(–)
2017–2020	ES Setif	–	(–)
2020–2021	NA Hussein Dey	–	(–)
2021–	Olympique de Médéa	0	(0)

International career^{‡}
2009–2011	Algeria U23	1	(0)
2011	Algeria Military	–	(–)
Medal record
Representing Algeria
Men's Football
Gold medal – first place	Rio 2011	Team competition
- * Club domestic league appearances and goals as of 23:30, April 01, 2017 (UTC) ‡ National team caps and goals as of 00:00, March 20, 2012 (UTC)

Ilyes Sidhoum (born August 10, 1989) is an Algerian football player who plays as a midfielder for Olympique de Médéa in the Algerian Ligue Professionnelle 1.

== Club career ==
In 2020, he signed a contract with NA Hussein Dey.

== International career ==
On December 22, 2009, Sidhoum was called up by Abdelhak Benchikha to the Algerian Under-23 National Team for a week-long training camp in Algiers. In May 2010, he was called up again for a training camp in Italy.

== Honours ==
- Won the World Military Cup once with the Algerian National Military Team in 2011
