= Hakim Khoudi =

Algerian footballer (born 1989)

Personal information
- Date of birth: 16 July 1989 (age 37)
- Position: Centre back

Team information
- Current team: USM El Harrach
- Number: 3

Senior career*
Years	Team	Apps	(Gls)
2010–2012	IB Lakhdaria		
2012–2018	CR Belouizdad	94	(4)
2018–2019	AS Aïn M'lila	13	(0)
2019–2020	JSM Skikda	10	(2)
2020–	USM El Harrach	0	(0)
- * Club domestic league appearances and goals as of 27 October 2020 (UTC)

Hakim Khoudi (born 16 July 1989) is an Algerian footballer who plays for USM El Harrach in the Algerian Ligue 2 as a defender.
