= Abdelkrim Nemdil =

Algerian footballer (born 1989)

Personal information
- Date of birth: 3 October 1989 (age 37)
- Place of birth: Sétif, Algeria
- Position: Right-back

Team information
- Current team: NC Magra
- Number: 22

Youth career
- Stade Africain Sétifien
- USM Sétif

Senior career*
Years	Team	Apps	(Gls)
–2013	USMM Hadjout		
2013–2014	ES Sétif	0	(0)
2013–2014	→ RC Arbaâ (loan)	25	(0)
2014–2017	CR Belouizdad	64	(0)
2017–2018	USM El Harrach	23	(0)
2018–2022	ES Sétif	103	(1)
2022–2023	Muaither		
2023–2024	Al-Zulfi		
2024–2025	USM Annaba		
2025–	NC Magra	9	(0)
- * Club domestic league appearances and goals as of 25 August 2022

Abdelkrim Nemdil (born 3 October 1989) is an Algerian footballer who plays as a right back for NC Magra.

== Career ==
In June 2014, Nemdil joined CR Belouizdad. In July 2017, he signed for USM El Harrach. In June 2018, he joined ES Sétif. In August 2022, he signed for Qatari club Muaither. On 19 July 2023, Nemdil joined Saudi club Al-Zulfi. In In February 2024, he signed for USM Annaba. In September 2025, he joined NC Magra.
