= Aboubaker Rebih =

Algerian footballer (born 1983)

Personal information
- Full name: Aboubaker Rebih
- Date of birth: December 18, 1983 (age 42)
- Place of birth: Koléa, Algeria
- Height: 1.74 m (5 ft 9 in)
- Position: Forward

Team information
- Current team: USM Annaba
- Number: 18

Youth career
- 1998–2003: USM Blida

Senior career*
Years	Team	Apps	(Gls)
2003–2008	USM Blida	106	(6)
2008–2010	USM Annaba	47	(8)
2010–2016	CR Belouizdad	167	(25)
2016–2017	CS Constantine	31	(4)
2017–2018	USM Annaba	10	(0)
Total		361	(43)

International career
2013	Algeria A'	1	(0)
- * Club domestic league appearances and goals as of 17:48, June 30, 2020 (UTC)

Aboubaker Rebih (born December 18, 1983, in Koléa) is an Algerian footballer. He currently plays for USM Annaba in the Algerian Ligue Professionnelle 2.

== Club career ==
In July 2010, Rebih signed a one-year contract with CR Belouizdad.
