= Abdellah Chebira =

Algerian professional footballer (born 1986)

Personal information
- Full name: Abdellah Chebira
- Date of birth: July 12, 1986 (age 40)
- Place of birth: Blida, Algeria
- Height: 1.78 m (5 ft 10 in)
- Position: Left-back

Team information
- Current team: USM Annaba
- Number: 27

Senior career*
Years	Team	Apps	(Gls)
2006–2011	USM Blida	130	(5)
2011–2012	USM Annaba	20	(2)
2012–2014	CA Bordj Bou Arreridj	48	(3)
2014–2018	CR Belouizdad	37	(2)
2018–	USM Annaba	0	(0)

International career^{‡}
2006–2008	Algeria U23	-	(-)
2008–	Algeria A'	0	(0)
- * Club domestic league appearances and goals as of 2018 ‡ National team caps and goals as of 10:46, 27 December 2010 (UTC)

Abdellah Chebira (born July 12, 1986) is an Algerian professional footballer. He is currently playing as a left-back for USM Annaba in the Algerian Ligue Professionnelle 2.

== International career ==
In 2006, Chebira was called up to the Algerian Under-23 National Team for a training camp in Algiers. In 2007, he was a member of the Under-23 National Team at the 2007 All-Africa Games. He came in a substitute in two group games against Zambia and Guinea.

On April 16, 2008, Chebira was called up to the Algerian A' National Team for a 2009 African Nations Championship qualifier against Morocco.
