= Adel Bougueroua =

Algerian footballer (born 1987)

Personal information
- Date of birth: 14 June 1987 (age 39)
- Position: Forward

Team information
- Current team: WA Boufarik

Senior career*
Years	Team	Apps	(Gls)
2013–2014	RC Arbaâ	23	(13)
2014–2017	CR Belouizdad	65	(7)
2017	ES Sétif	?	(?)
2017	CA Bordj Bou Arreridj	?	(?)
2018	USM El Harrach	?	(?)
2018–2019	RC Kouba	?	(2)
2019–	WA Boufarik	?	
- * Club domestic league appearances and goals as of 11 December 2016

Adel Bougueroua (born 14 June 1987) is an Algerian footballer who is currently playing as forward for WA Boufarik.
