= Tarek Cheurfaoui =

Algerian footballer (born 1986)

Personal information
- Date of birth: 28 June 1986 (age 40)
- Place of birth: Sétif, Algeria
- Position: Defender

Senior career*
Years	Team	Apps	(Gls)
2013–2014	RC Arbaâ	24	(1)
2014–2017	CR Belouizdad	71	(3)
2017–2019	NA Hussein Dey	18	(1)
2019–2021	O Médéa	23	(1)
2021–2023	HB Chelghoum Laïd	33	(1)
2023	NC Magra	5	(0)
- * Club domestic league appearances and goals as of 5 February 2023

Tarek Cheurfaoui (Arabic: طارق شرفاوي; born 28 June 1986) is an Algerian former footballer who played as a defender.
