= 2014–15 MO Béjaïa season =

MO Béjaïa
2014–15 season
- Chairman: Ikhlef Boubekeur
- Head coach: Abdelkader Amrani
- Stadium: Stade de l'Unité Maghrébine
- Ligue 1: Runner-up
- Algerian Cup: Winner
- Top goalscorer: League: Zahir Zerdab (8); All: Zahir Zerdab; Okacha Hamzaoui (9)

In the 2014–15 season, MO Béjaïa is competing in the Ligue 1 for the 2nd season, as well as the Algerian Cup. They will be competing in Ligue 1, and the Algerian Cup.

== Squad list ==
Players and squad numbers last updated on 18 November 2014.
Note: Flags indicate national team as has been defined under FIFA eligibility rules. Players may hold more than one non-FIFA nationality.

| No. | Nat. | Position | Name | Date of birth (age) | Signed from |
Goalkeepers
| 1 | (Algeria) | GK | Ismaïl Mansouri | 7 January 1988 (aged 26) | (Algeria) USM Alger |
| 25 | (Algeria) | GK | Chamseddine Rahmani | 15 September 1990 (aged 24) | (Algeria) USM Annaba |
| | (Algeria) | GK | Yacine Sidi Salah | 14 August 1996 (aged 18) | Youth system |
Defenders
| 2 | (Algeria) | RB | Amir Aguid | 26 September 1992 (aged 22) | (Algeria) WA Tlemcen |
| 31 | (Algeria) | RB | Salim Benali | 10 April 1992 (aged 22) | Youth system |
| 19 | (Algeria) | RB | Mounir Guedjali | 14 June 1987 (aged 27) | (Algeria) ESM Koléa |
| 15 | (Algeria) | RB | Zidane Mebarakou | 3 January 1989 (aged 25) | (Algeria) JSM Béjaïa |
| 28 | (Algeria) | RB | Yacine Salhi | 19 December 1992 (aged 22) | Youth system |
| 23 | (Algeria) | RB | Sofiane Baouali | 7 January 1987 (aged 27) | (Algeria) |
| 6 | (France) (Algeria) | RB | Jugurtha Domrane | 13 July 1989 (aged 25) | (Algeria) USM Bel-Abbès |
| 46 | (Algeria) | RB | Abdelkader Messaoudi | 26 May 1987 (aged 27) | (Algeria) CS Constantine |
Midfielders
| | (Algeria) | CM | Rédha Abdelmalek Betrouni | 19 August 1991 (aged 23) | (Algeria) USM Alger |
| 99 | (Algeria) | CM | Nassim Dehouche | 12 August 1982 (aged 32) | (Algeria) MC El Eulma |
| 10 | (Algeria) | CM | Okacha Hamzaoui | 12 November 1990 (aged 24) | (Algeria) JS Saoura |
| 18 | (Algeria) | CM | Faouzi Rahal | 23 July 1985 (aged 29) | (Algeria) |
| 32 | (Algeria) | CM | Zahir Zerdab | 9 January 1982 (aged 32) | (Algeria) CS Constantine |
| | (Algeria) | CM | Djamel Eddine Chatal | 23 May 1992 (aged 22) | (Algeria) USM Alger |
| 70 | (Mauritania) | CM | Oumar N'Diaye | 9 December 1988 (aged 26) | (France) Limoges FC |
| | (Mali) | CM | Soumaila Sidibe | 5 June 1992 (aged 22) | Youth system |
| 8 | (Algeria) | CM | Malek Ferhat | 7 March 1989 (aged 25) | (Algeria) |
Forwards
| 11 | (Algeria) | RW | Hamza Banouh | 15 June 1990 (aged 24) | (Algeria) RC Kouba |
| | (Algeria) | RW | Réda Bensaid Sayah | 19 June 1989 (aged 25) | (Algeria) CS Constantine |
| | (Algeria) | RW | Messipsa Rachedi | 21 October 1994 (aged 20) | Youth system |
| 9 | (Algeria) | RW | Yazid Yaya | 21 September 1989 (aged 25) | Youth system |

== Competitions ==
=== Overview ===
| Competition | Record | | | | | | | | Started round | Final position / round | First match | Last match |
| Competition | G | W | D | L | GF | GA | GD | Win % | Started round | Final position / round | First match | Last match |
|---|---|---|---|---|---|---|---|---|---|---|---|---|
| Ligue 1 | 30 | 12 | 11 | 7 | 36 | 23 | +13 | 40.00 | —N/a | Runner-up | 16 August 2014 | 29 May 2015 |
| Algerian Cup | 6 | 2 | 4 | 0 | 6 | 4 | +2 | 33.33 | Round of 64 | Winners | 13 December 2014 | 2 May 2015 |
| Total | 36 | 14 | 15 | 7 | 42 | 27 | +15 | 38.89 | | | | |

=== Ligue 1 ===
==== League table ====
| Pos | Team | Pld | W | D | L | GF | GA | GD | Pts | Qualification or relegation |
|---|---|---|---|---|---|---|---|---|---|---|
| 1 | ES Sétif (C) | 30 | 13 | 9 | 8 | 37 | 28 | +9 | 48 | 2016 CAF Champions League |
| 2 | MO Béjaïa | 30 | 12 | 11 | 7 | 36 | 23 | +13 | 47 | 2016 CAF Champions League |
| 3 | MC Oran | 30 | 11 | 11 | 8 | 19 | 19 | 0 | 44 | 2016 CAF Confederation Cup |
| 4 | USM El Harrach | 30 | 13 | 4 | 13 | 30 | 32 | −2 | 43 | |
| 5 | CS Constantine | 30 | 11 | 9 | 10 | 32 | 31 | +1 | 42 (Note: CSC 3-1 CRB; CRB 1-1 CSC) | 2016 CAF Confederation Cup |

Updated to match(es) played on 29 May 2015. Source: DZFoot
Rules for classification: 1) points; 2) head-to-head points; 3) head-to-head goal difference; 4) goal difference; 5) total goals; 6) fairplay ranking; 7) playoff
(C) Champions

==== Results summary ====
| Overall | | | | | | | | Home | | | | | | Away | | | | | |
| Pld | W | D | L | GF | GA | GD | Pts | W | D | L | GF | GA | GD | W | D | L | GF | GA | GD |
|---|---|---|---|---|---|---|---|---|---|---|---|---|---|---|---|---|---|---|---|
| 30 | 12 | 11 | 7 | 36 | 23 | +13 | 47 | 7 | 6 | 2 | 20 | 10 | +10 | 5 | 5 | 5 | 16 | 13 | +3 |

Last updated: 29 December 2014.
Source: Competitive matches

==== Results by round ====
| Round | 1 | 2 | 3 | 4 | 5 | 6 | 7 | 8 | 9 | 10 | 11 | 12 | 13 | 14 | 15 | 16 | 17 | 18 | 19 | 20 | 21 | 22 | 23 | 24 | 25 | 26 | 27 | 28 | 29 | 30 |
|---|---|---|---|---|---|---|---|---|---|---|---|---|---|---|---|---|---|---|---|---|---|---|---|---|---|---|---|---|---|---|
| Ground | A | H | A | A | H | A | H | A | H | A | H | A | H | A | H | H | A | H | H | A | H | A | H | A | H | A | H | A | H | A |
| Result | W | D | D | D | D | D | W | W | W | L | W | D | L | W | W | D | W | D | W | L | W | L | D | L | L | L | D | D | W | W |
| Position | 2 | 2 | 5 | 5 | 7 | 8 | 3 | 1 | 1 | 2 | 1 | 1 | 4 | 2 | 1 | 1 | 1 | 1 | 1 | 1 | 1 | 1 | 1 | 1 | 2 | 2 | 2 | 2 | 2 | 2 |

Updated to match(es) played on 29 December 2014. Source: Competitive matches
A = Away; H = Home; W = Win; D = Draw; L = Loss

==== Matches ====
| 16 August 2014 1 | NA Hussein Dey | 0–2 | MO Béjaïa | Algiers |
| 17:00 | | Report | 23', 33' Ballo | Stadium: Stade Omar Hammadi; Referee: Mohamed Bichari |

| 23 August 2014 2 | MO Béjaïa | 1–1 | JS Saoura | Béjaïa |
| 19:00 | Zerdab 62' | Report | 42' Djousse | Stadium: Stade de l'Unité Maghrébine; Referee: Merzak Halalchi |

| 13 September 2014 3 | ASO Chlef | 0–0 | MO Béjaïa | Chlef |
| 19:00 | | Report | | Stadium: Stade Mohamed Boumezrag; Referee: Mohamed Boukhalfa |

| 20 September 2014 4 | ASM Oran | 1–1 | MO Béjaïa | Oran |
| 17:45 | Djemaouni 80' | Report | 24' (o.g.) Zidane | Stadium: Stade Ahmed Zabana; Referee: Farouk Houasnia |

| 27 September 2014 5 | MO Béjaïa | 2–2 | MC Alger | Béjaïa |
| 19:00 | Ferhat 57'; Ballo 74' | Report | 27' Berchiche; 65' Gourmi | Stadium: Stade de l'Unité Maghrébine; Referee: Bachi, Etchiali, Hadj Saïd |

| 2 October 2014 6 | ES Sétif | 1–1 | MO Béjaïa | Sétif |
| 20:00 | Younès 88' | Report | 37' Rahal | Stadium: Stade 8 Mai 1945; Referee: Hamza Bouslimani |

| 18 October 2014 7 | MO Béjaïa | 2–0 | CS Constantine | Béjaïa |
| 18:00 | Rahal 45' (pen.); Dehouche 87' | Report | | Stadium: Stade de l'Unité Maghrébine; Referee: Mustapha Bessiri |

| 25 October 2014 8 | CR Belouizdad | 0–2 | MO Béjaïa | Algiers |
| 16:00 | | Report | 4' Hamzaoui; 90' (o.g.) Cheurfaoui | Stadium: Stade 20 Août 1955; Referee: Mohamed Saïdi |

| 1 November 2014 9 | MO Béjaïa | 2–0 | RC Arbaâ | Béjaïa |
| 18:00 | Rahal 12' (pen.); Yaya 82' | Report | | Stadium: Stade de l'Unité Maghrébine; Referee: Redouane Necib |

| 8 November 2014 10 | USM El Harrach | 2–1 | MO Béjaïa | El Harrach |
| 15:00 | Keniche 25'; Abid 49' | Report | 45+1' Hamzaoui | Stadium: Stade 1er Novembre 1954; Referee: Bekouassa, Bounoua, Rachedi |

| 21 November 2014 11 | MO Béjaïa | 3–1 | JS Kabylie | Béjaïa |
| 16:00 | Messaoudi 9'; Yaya 23'; Hamzaoui 70' | Report | 4' Youcef Khodja | Stadium: Stade de l'Unité Maghrébine; Referee: Mohamed Bichari |

| 29 November 2014 12 | MC Oran | 1–1 | MO Béjaïa | Oran |
| 18:00 | Za'abia 47' | Report | 25' Zerdab | Stadium: Stade Ahmed Zabana; Attendance: 0 (close doors); Referee: Said Aouina |

| 6 December 2014 13 | MO Béjaïa | 0–1 | USM Alger | Béjaïa |
| 16:00 | Benali (yellow card) 37'; Sidibé (yellow card) 76'; Rahal (yellow card) 73'; Dehouche (yellow card) 79' | Report | 35' Meftah; (yellow card) 6' Benkhemassa; (yellow card) 17' Laïfaoui; (yellow card) 33' Belaïli; (yellow card) 88' Chafaï | Stadium: Stade de l'Unité Maghrébine; Referee: Abderrezzak Arab |

| 20 December 2014 14 | MC El Eulma | 1–2 | MO Béjaïa | El Eulma |
| 18:00 | Hamiti 72' | Report | 76' Banouh; 90+4' Chatal | Stadium: Stade Messaoud Zougar; Referee: Farouk Houasnia |

| 30 December 2014 15 | MO Béjaïa | 1–0 | USM Bel-Abbès | Béjaïa |
| 18:00 | Sidibe 4' | Report | | Stadium: Stade de l'Unité Maghrébine; Referee: Boubekeur Zouaoui |

| 20 January 2015 16 | MO Béjaïa | 0–0 | NA Hussein Dey | Béjaïa |
| 17:00 | | Report | | Stadium: Stade de l'Unité Maghrébine; Referee: Mohamed Boukhalfa |

| 24 January 2015 17 | JS Saoura | 0–1 | MO Béjaïa | Béchar |
| 15:00 | | Report | 90+4' Chatal | Stadium: Stade 20 Août 1955; Referee: Mohamed Benouza |

| 31 January 2015 18 | MO Béjaïa | 0–0 | ASO Chlef | Béjaïa |
| 16:00 | | Report | | Stadium: Stade de l'Unité Maghrébine; Referee: Hamza Bouslimani |

| 6 February 2015 19 | MO Béjaïa | 1–0 | ASM Oran | Béjaïa |
| 18:00 | Hamzaoui 11' | Report | | Stadium: Stade de l'Unité Maghrébine; Referee: Said Aouina |

| 10 February 2015 20 | MC Alger | 1–0 | MO Béjaïa | Algiers |
| 16:00 | Gourmi 29' | Report | | Stadium: Stade Omar Hammadi; Referee: Mohamed Bichari |

| 28 February 2015 21 | MO Béjaïa | 3–0 | ES Sétif | Béjaïa |
| 16:00 | Hamzaoui 8'; Zerdab 31', 65' | Report | | Stadium: Stade de l'Unité Maghrébine; Referee: Mohamed Benouza |

| 7 March 2015 22 | CS Constantine | 1–0 | MO Béjaïa | Constantine |
| 16:00 | Voavy 10' | Report | | Stadium: Stade Mohamed Hamlaoui; Referee: Mohamed Ghorbal |

| 21 March 2015 23 | MO Béjaïa | 2–2 | CR Belouizdad | Béjaïa |
| 16:00 | Rahal 3' (pen.); Zerdab 38' | Report | 43' Cheurfaoui; 78' Derrag | Stadium: Stade de l'Unité Maghrébine; Referee: Redouane Necib |

| 28 March 2015 24 | RC Arbaâ | 1–0 | MO Béjaïa | Larbaâ |
| 16:00 | El Mouden 90' | Report | | Stadium: Stade Ismaïl Makhlouf; Referee: Mokhtar Amalou |

| 17 April 2015 25 | MO Béjaïa | 0–1 | USM El Harrach | Béjaïa |
| 16:00 | | Report | 90+4' Benachour | Stadium: Stade de l'Unité Maghrébine; Referee: Mustapha Bessiri |

| 25 April 2015 26 | JS Kabylie | 2–1 | MO Béjaïa | Tizi Ouzou |
| 17:00 | Rial 63', 75' | Report | 35' N’Diaye | Stadium: Stade du 1er Novembre 1954; Referee: Mehdi Abid Charef |

| 9 May 2015 27 | MO Béjaïa | 0–0 | MC Oran | Béjaïa |
| 17:00 | | Report | | Stadium: Stade de l'Unité Maghrébine; Referee: Abderrezzak Arab |

| 16 May 2015 28 | USM Alger | 1–1 | MO Béjaïa | Algiers |
| 17:00 | Beldjilali 28'; Meftah (yellow card) 31' | Report; Live TV: Canal Algérie / beIN Sports / Al Kass Sports | 71' Zerdab; (yellow card) 50' Mebarakou; (yellow card) 80' Yaya (yellow card) 85' Rahmani | Stadium: Stade Omar Hammadi; Referee: Mokhtar Amalou |

| 23 May 2015 29 | MO Béjaïa | 3–2 | MC El Eulma | Béjaïa |
| 17:00 | Hamzaoui 2', 31'; Zerdab 65' (pen.) | Report | 40' Maïza; 45' (pen.) Abbès | Stadium: Stade de l'Unité Maghrébine; Referee: Mehdi Abid Charef |

| 29 May 2015 30 | USM Bel-Abbès | 1–3 | MO Béjaïa | Sidi Bel Abbès |
| 17:00 | Abdat 26' (pen.) | Report | 19' Yaya; 74' Salhi; 76' Zerdab | Stadium: Stade 24 Fevrier 1956; Referee: Boukouassa, Azerine, Bourouba |

== Algerian Cup ==
| 12 December 2014 Round of 64 | MO Béjaïa | 1–1 (a.e.t.) (4–3 p) | JS Saoura | Béjaïa |
| 16:00 | Okacha Hamzaoui 90' | Repport | 33' Jean Bapidi | Stadium: Stade de l'Unité Maghrébine; Attendance: 0 (close doors); Referee: Ghorbal, Serradj, Charchar |

| 27 December 2014 Round of 32 | CA Batna | 0 – 1 | MO Béjaïa | Batna |
| 14:00 | | Repport | 57' Yaya | Stadium: Stade 1er Novembre 1954; Referee: Mehdi Abid Charef |

| 21 February 2015 Round of 16 | MC Oran | 0–0 (a.e.t.) (1–4 p) | MO Béjaïa | Oran |
| 14:00 | | Repport | | Stadium: Stade Ahmed Zabana; Referee: Mehdi Abid Charef |

| 14 March 2015 Quarter-finals | ASM Oran | 2–2 (5–6 p) | MO Béjaïa | Oran |
| 16:00 | Sidibe 5' (o.g.); Messaoudi 119' (o.g.) | Repport | 14' Dehouche; 104' Hamzaoui | Stadium: Stade Ahmed Zabana; Referee: Bekouassa, Bounoua, Rachedi |

| 10 April 2015 Semi-finals | ES Sétif | 1–1 (a.e.t.) (5–6 p) | MO Béjaïa | Sétif |
| 16:00 | Mellouli 1' | Repport | Mebarakou 9' | Stadium: Stade 8 Mai 1945; Referee: Mohamed Benouza |
| | Penalties |
| | Younès (penalty scored); Delhoum (penalty scored); Zerara (penalty scored); Lagraâ (penalty scored); Belameiri (penalty missed); Ziaya (penalty scored); Raït (penalty missed) | | (penalty missed) Rahal; (penalty scored) Chatal; (penalty scored) N'Diaye; (penalty scored) ?; (penalty scored) Mebarakou; (penalty scored) Benali; (penalty scored) Sidibe |

| 2 May 2015 Final | MO Béjaïa | 1–0 | RC Arbaâ | Blida |
| 16:00 | Zahir Zerdab 43' | Report | | Stadium: Stade Mustapha Tchaker; Attendance: 35.000; Referee: Mohamed Bichari |

== Squad information ==
=== Playing statistics ===
| No. | Pos | Nat | Player | Total | | Ligue 1 | | Algerian Cup | |
| No. | Pos | Nat | Player | Apps | Goals | Apps | Goals | Apps | Goals |
Goalkeepers
| 1 | GK | (Algeria) ALG | Ismaïl Mansouri | 16 | 0 | 16 | 0 | 0 | 0 |
| | GK | (Algeria) ALG | Mustapha Zaidi | 3 | 0 | 3 | 0 | 0 | 0 |
| 25 | GK | (Algeria) ALG | Chamseddine Rahmani | 11 | 0 | 11 | 0 | 0 | 0 |
Defenders
| 46 | DF | (Algeria) ALG | Abdelkader Messaoudi | 21 | 1 | 21 | 1 | 0 | 0 |
| 6 | DF | (Algeria) ALG | Jugurtha Domrane | 6 | 0 | 6 | 0 | 0 | 0 |
| 15 | DF | (Algeria) ALG | Zidane Mebarakou | 28 | 0 | 28 | 0 | 0 | 0 |
| 2 | DF | (Algeria) ALG | Amir Aguid | 28 | 0 | 28 | 0 | 0 | 0 |
| 23 | DF | (Algeria) ALG | Sofiane Baouali | 8 | 0 | 8 | 0 | 0 | 0 |
| | DF | (Algeria) ALG | Ali Bouamria | 4 | 0 | 4 | 0 | 0 | 0 |
| 28 | DF | (Algeria) ALG | Yacine Salhi | 10 | 1 | 10 | 1 | 0 | 0 |
| 31 | DF | (Algeria) ALG | Salim Benali | 28 | 0 | 28 | 0 | 0 | 0 |
| | DF | (Algeria) ALG | Anis Mouhli | 4 | 0 | 4 | 0 | 0 | 0 |
Midfielders
| 70 | MF | (Mauritania) MTN | Oumar N'Diaye | 11 | 1 | 11 | 1 | 0 | 0 |
| 99 | MF | (Algeria) ALG | Nassim Dehouche | 26 | 1 | 26 | 1 | 0 | 0 |
| 32 | MF | (Algeria) ALG | Zahir Zerdab | 28 | 8 | 28 | 8 | 0 | 0 |
| | MF | (Algeria) ALG | Rédha Abdelmalek Betrouni | 1 | 0 | 1 | 0 | 0 | 0 |
| | MF | (Mali) MLI | Soumaila Sidibe | 28 | 1 | 28 | 1 | 0 | 0 |
| 9 | MF | (Algeria) ALG | Faouzi Yaya | 29 | 3 | 29 | 3 | 0 | 0 |
| | MF | (Algeria) ALG | Djamel Eddine Chatal | 21 | 2 | 21 | 2 | 0 | 0 |
| 8 | MF | (Algeria) ALG | Malek Ferhat | 18 | 1 | 18 | 1 | 0 | 0 |
| 18 | MF | (Algeria) ALG | Faouzi Rahal | 27 | 4 | 27 | 4 | 0 | 0 |
| | MF | (Algeria) ALG | Mohamed Aissa Atamna | 1 | 0 | 1 | 0 | 0 | 0 |
| | MF | (Algeria) ALG | Mohamed Yacine Athmani | 1 | 0 | 1 | 0 | 0 | 0 |
Forwards
| | FW | (Algeria) ALG | Réda Bensaid Sayah | 6 | 0 | 6 | 0 | 0 | 0 |
| | FW | (Mali) MLI | Salif Ballo | 14 | 3 | 14 | 3 | 0 | 0 |
| 10 | FW | (Algeria) ALG | Okacha Hamzaoui | 23 | 7 | 23 | 7 | 0 | 0 |
| | FW | (Algeria) ALG | Imad Brahmia | 1 | 0 | 1 | 0 | 0 | 0 |
| 11 | FW | (Algeria) ALG | Hamza Banouh | 12 | 1 | 12 | 1 | 0 | 0 |
| | FW | (Algeria) ALG | Messipsa Rachedi | 1 | 0 | 1 | 0 | 0 | 0 |
Players transferred out during the season

Last updated: 11 June 2018
Source: fr.soccerway.com

=== Goalscorers ===
Includes all competitive matches. The list is sorted alphabetically by surname when total goals are equal.

| No. | Nat. | Player | Pos. | L 1 | AC | TOTAL |
|---|---|---|---|---|---|---|
| 32 | (Algeria) | Zahir Zerdab | MF | 8 | 1 | 9 |
| 10 | (Algeria) | Okacha Hamzaoui | MF | 7 | 2 | 9 |
| 18 | (Algeria) | Faouzi Rahal | MF | 4 | 0 | 4 |
| 9 | (Algeria) | Yazid Yaya | FW | 3 | 1 | 4 |
| 10 | (Mali) | Salif Ballo | FW | 3 | 0 | 3 |
| | (Algeria) | Djamel Eddine Chatal | MF | 2 | 0 | 2 |
| 99 | (Algeria) | Nassim Dehouche | MF | 1 | 1 | 2 |
| 11 | (Algeria) | Hamza Banouh | FW | 1 | 0 | 1 |
| 8 | (Algeria) | Malek Ferhat | MF | 1 | 0 | 1 |
| 15 | (Algeria) | Zidane Mebarakou | DF | 0 | 1 | 1 |
| 46 | (Algeria) | Abdelkader Messaoudi | DF | 1 | 0 | 1 |
| 70 | (Mauritania) | Oumar N'Diaye | MF | 1 | 0 | 1 |
| 28 | (Algeria) | Yacine Salhi | DF | 1 | 0 | 1 |
| | (Mali) | Soumaila Sidibe | MF | 1 | 0 | 1 |
| Own Goals | | | | 0 | 0 | 0 |
| Totals | | | | 36 | 6 | 22 |

== Transfers ==
=== In ===
| Date | Pos | Player | From club | Transfer fee | Source |
|---|---|---|---|---|---|
| 14 June 2014 | DF | (Algeria) Zidane Mebarakou | JSM Béjaïa | Undisclosed | |
| 1 July 2014 | GK | (Algeria) Ismaïl Mansouri | USM Alger | Loan for one year | |
| 1 July 2014 | GK | (Algeria) Chamseddine Rahmani | USM Annaba | Undisclosed | |
| 1 July 2014 | DF | (Algeria) Abdelkader Messaoudi | WA Tlemcen | Undisclosed | |
| 1 July 2014 | DF | (Algeria) Amir Aguid | WA Tlemcen | Undisclosed | |
| 1 July 2014 | DF | (Algeria) Salim Benali | ESM Koléa | Undisclosed | |
| 1 July 2014 | MF | (Algeria) Rédha Abdelmalek Betrouni | USM Alger | Free transfer | |
| 1 July 2014 | FW | (Algeria) Okacha Hamzaoui | JS Saoura | Undisclosed | |
| 10 July 2014 | MF | (Algeria) Zahir Zerdab | CS Constantine | Undisclosed | |
| 10 July 2014 | FW | (Algeria) Réda Bensaid Sayah | MC Alger | Undisclosed | |
| 12 July 2014 | MF | (Algeria) Djamel Eddine Chatal | USM Alger | Loan for one year | |
| 27 July 2014 | FW | (Mali) Salif Ballo | (Azerbaijan) Simurq PFC | Undisclosed | |
| 9 January 2015 | DF | (Algeria) Jugurtha Domrane | USM Bel Abbès | Undisclosed | |
| 14 January 2015 | MF | (Mauritania) Oumar N'Diaye | Unattached | Free transfer | |
