= 2015 Algerian Cup final =

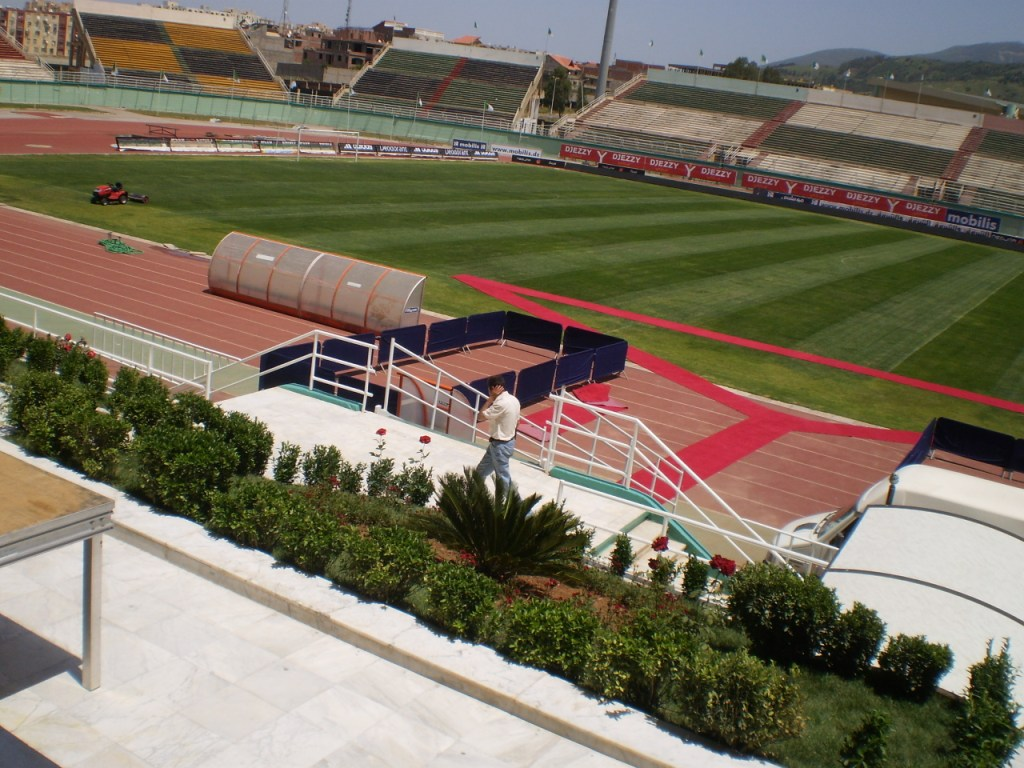
- Mustapha Tchaker Stadium hosted the match
- Event: 2014–15 Algerian Cup
MO Béjaïa	RC Arbaâ
1	0
- Date: May 1, 2015
- Venue: Stade Mustapha Tchaker, Blida
- Man of the Match: Zahir Zerdab
- Referee: Mohamed Bichari
- Attendance: 35.000

The 2015 Algerian Cup final was the 51st final of the Algerian Cup. The final took place on May 2, 2015, at Stade Mustapha Tchaker in Blida with kick-off at 16:00.

== Route to the final ==
MO Béjaïa

Round of 64	MO Béjaïa	1 – 1; 4 – 3 (pen.)	JS Saoura
Round of 32	CA Batna	0 – 1	MO Béjaïa
Round of 16	MC Oran	0 – 0; 1 – 4 (pen.)	MO Béjaïa
Quarter-finals	ASM Oran	2 – 2; 5 – 6 (pen.)	MO Béjaïa
Semifinals	ES Sétif	1 – 1; 5 – 6 (pen.)	MO Béjaïa

RC Arbaâ

Round of 64	MSP Batna	0 – 1	RC Arbaâ
Round of 32	AHM Hassi Messaoud	1 – 3	RC Arbaâ
Round of 16	CRB Aïn Fakroun	0 – 1 (a.e.t.)	RC Arbaâ
Quarter-finals	NA Hussein Dey	1 – 1; 1 – 3 (pen.)	RC Arbaâ
Semifinals	RC Arbaâ	0 – 0; 3 – 0 (pen.)	ASO Chlef

== Pre-match ==
=== Details ===
May 2, 2015
16:00

MO Béjaïa	1–0	RC Arbaâ
Zahir Zerdab 43'	Report

Stade Mustapha Tchaker, Blida
Attendance: 35.000
Referee: Mohamed Bichari

MO Béjaïa	RC Arbaâ

GK	1	(Algeria) Ismaïl Mansouri
DF	46	(Algeria) Abdelkader Messaoudi	(yellow card) 85'
DF	5	(Algeria) Zidane Mebarakou
DF	31	(Algeria) Salim Benali
DF	2	(Algeria) Amir Aguid
MF	99	(Algeria) Nassim Dehouche (c)		(substituted off) 90'
MF	15	(Mali) Soumaila Sidibé
FW	32	(Algeria) Zahir Zerdab
FW	10	(Algeria) Faouzi Yaya		(substituted off) 82'
MF	18	(Algeria) Faouzi Rahal
FW	9	(Algeria) Okacha Hamzaoui		(substituted off) 63'
Substitutes:
DF	28	(Algeria) Yassine Salhi		(substituted on) 63'
MF	70	(Mauritania) Oumar N'Diaye		(substituted on) 82'
MF	7	(Algeria) Djamel Eddine Chatal		(substituted on) 90'
Manager:
(Algeria) Abdelkader Amrani

GK	31	(Algeria) Ahmed Fellah
DF	64	(Algeria) Houari Ferhani
DF	25	(Algeria) Hamza Zeddam (c)	(yellow card) 90+2'
DF	5	(France) Mohamed Reda Maarif		(substituted off) 63'
DF	24	(Algeria) Nasreddine Zaâlani
MF	18	(Algeria) Farid Daoud		(substituted off) 46'
MF	8	(Algeria) Abdelmalek Mokdad
MF	88	(Algeria) Elyes Seddiki	(yellow card) 75'
FW	55	(Algeria) Mohamed Nassim Yettou
FW	13	(Algeria) Oussama Derfalou
MF	21	(Algeria) Djamel Bouaicha		(substituted off) 54'
Substitutes:
FW	78	(Algeria) Mehdi Kacem		(substituted on) 45'
FW	9	(Chad) Morgan Bitorgal		(substituted on) 54'
MF	27	(Algeria) Abdellah El Mouaden		(substituted on) 63'
Manager:
(Algeria) Mohamed Mihoubi

MATCH OFFICIALS

- Assistant referees:
  - Brahim El Hamlaoui
  - Mohamed Serradj
- Fourth official:
  - Redouane Necib
