= 2015–16 MO Béjaïa season =

MO Béjaïa
2015–16 season
- Chairman: Nacer Maouche
- Head coach: Alain Geiger (until 13 September 2015); Abdelkader Amrani (from 16 September 2015)
- Stadium: Stade de l'Unité Maghrébine
- Ligue 1: 6th
- Algerian Cup: Round of 16
- Super Cup: Runners–up
- Champions League: Second round
- Confederation Cup: Play-off round
- Top goalscorer: League: Mohamed Waliou Ndoye (9); All: Mohamed Waliou Ndoye (13)

In the 2015–16 season, MO Béjaïa is competing in the Ligue 1 for the 3rd season, as well as the Algerian Cup. They will be competing in Ligue 1, and the Algerian Cup.

== Squad list ==
Players and squad numbers last updated on 15 August 2015.
Note: Flags indicate national team as has been defined under FIFA eligibility rules. Players may hold more than one non-FIFA nationality.

No.	Nat.	Position	Name	Date of Birth (Age)	Signed from
Goalkeepers
Defenders
Midfielders
Forwards

== Competitions ==
=== Overview ===
Competition	Record								Started round	Final position / round	First match	Last match
Competition	G	W	D	L	GF	GA	GD	Win %	Started round	Final position / round	First match	Last match
Ligue 1	30	11	11	8	33	23	+10	36.67	—N/a	6th	15 August 2015	27 May 2015
Algerian Cup	3	1	1	1	4	4	+0	33.33	Round of 64	Round of 16	19 December 2015	20 February 2016
CAF Champions League	6	2	1	3	6	6	+0	33.33	Preliminary round	Second round	14 February 2016	19 April 2016
CAF Confederation Cup	4	1	3	0	2	1	+1	25.00	Play-off round	Group stage	7 May 2016	17 May 2016
Algerian Super Cup	1	0	0	1	0	1	−1	0.00	Final	Runners–up	1 November 2015	
Total	44	15	16	13	45	35	+10	34.09				

== League table ==
Pos	Team	Pld	W	D	L	GF	GA	GD	Pts
4	CR Belouizdad	30	11	12	7	40	29	+11	45 (Note: JS Kabylie ahead of CR Belouizdad on head-to-head record: JSK–CRB 1–0, CRB–JSK 1–1.)
5	ES Sétif	30	11	11	8	31	19	+12	44 (Note: ES Sétif ahead of MO Béjaïa on head-to-head record: ESS–MOB 0–0, MOB–ESS 0–0.)
6	MO Béjaïa	30	11	11	8	33	23	+10	44
7	DRB Tadjenanet	30	11	10	9	32	30	+2	43
8	CS Constantine	30	11	9	10	26	32	−6	42

Updated to match(es) played on 27 May 2016. Source: DZFoot
Rules for classification: 1) points; 2) head-to-head points; 3) head-to-head goal difference; 4) goal difference; 5) total goals; 6) fairplay ranking; 7) playoff.

=== Results summary ===
Overall								Home						Away					
Pld	W	D	L	GF	GA	GD	Pts	W	D	L	GF	GA	GD	W	D	L	GF	GA	GD
30	11	11	8	33	23	+10	44	8	6	1	17	7	+10	3	5	7	16	16	0

Last updated: 31 January 2015.
Source: Competitive matches

=== Results by round ===
Round	1	2	3	4	5	6	7	8	9	10	11	12	13	14	15	16	17	18	19	20	21	22	23	24	25	26	27	28	29	30
Ground	A	H	A	H	A	H	A	H	A	H	A	H	A	H	A	H	A	H	A	H	A	H	A	H	A	H	A	H	A	H
Result	W	D	D	D	D	L	W	L	W	D	W	L	W	L	W	W	D	W	L	D	L	W	D	W	D	L	D	L	W	D
Position	1	6	8	6	6	8	6	8	6	6	5	6	5	6	4	3	3	3	3	3	4	2	2	2	2	5	5	7	5	6

Updated to match(es) played on 31 January 2015. Source: Competitive matches
A = Away; H = Home; W = Win; D = Draw; L = Loss

=== Matches ===
Win Draw Loss

15 August 2015 Round 1	RC Arbaâ	0–2	MO Béjaïa	Blida
17:00		Report; Live TV: Algérie 3 / Canal Algérie	14' Zerdab; 83' Mebarki	Stadium: Stade Mustapha Tchaker; Referee: Arab, Beyoud, Hamraoui

22 August 2015 Round 2	MO Béjaïa	0–0	JS Kabylie	Béjaïa
18:00		Report; Live TV: None		Stadium: Stade de l'Unité Maghrébine; Attendance: 0 (close doors); Referee: Boukhalfa, Etchiali, Zerhouni

29 August 2015 Round 3	MC Oran	3–3	MO Béjaïa	Oran
18:00	Moussi 12', 24'; Larbi 61'	Report; Live TV: None	17' Boukria; 58' Ndoye; 73' Youcef	Stadium: Stade Ahmed Zabana; Referee: Necib, Benacer, Maghlout

12 September 2015 Round 4	MO Béjaïa	0–0	CS Constantine	Béjaïa
17:00		Report; Live TV: TV Tamazight 4 / Canal Algérie		Stadium: Stade de l'Unité Maghrébine; Referee: Amalou, Azrine, Arab

19 September 2015 Round 5	ES Sétif	0–0	MO Béjaïa	Sétif
18:00		Report; Live TV: None		Stadium: Stade 8 Mai 1945; Referee: Abid Charef, Itchiali, Gourari

2 October 2015 Round 7	MO Béjaïa	1–0	CR Belouizdad	Béjaïa
17:00	Belkacemi 11'	Report; Live TV: TV Tamazight 4 / Canal Algérie		Stadium: Stade de l'Unité Maghrébine; Referee: Boukhalfa, Zerhouni, Benali

13 October 2015 Round 6	USM Alger	3–2	MO Béjaïa	Bologhine
18:00	Nadji 48'; Seguer 53'; Meftah 67' (pen.)	Report; Live TV: None	38' Salhi; 59' Ndoye	Stadium: Stade Omar Hamadi; Referee: Arab, Boulfelfel, Dioud

17 October 2015 Round 8	RC Relizane	1–0	MO Béjaïa	Relizane
16:00	Tiaiba 21'	Report; Live TV: Canal Algérie		Stadium: Stade Tahar Zoughari; Referee: Aouina, Benaissa, Chenoua

23 October 2015 Round 9	MO Béjaïa	2–0	ASM Oran	Béjaïa
18:00	Hamzaoui 50'; Ndoye 70'	Report; Live TV: None		Stadium: Stade de l'Unité Maghrébine; Referee: Bouslimani, Brahmi, Rimouche

27 October 2015 Round 10	USM Blida	0–0	MO Béjaïa	Blida
15:00		Report; Live TV: None		Stadium: Stade Frères Brakni; Referee: Benouza, Omari, Ayad

6 November 2015 Round 11	MO Béjaïa	2–1	JS Saoura	Béjaïa
18:00	Yaya 25'; Lakhdari 73'	Report	77' Mbondi	Stadium: Stade de l'Unité Maghrébine; Referee: Houasnia, Badache, Tazrout

19 November 2015 Round 12	USM El Harrach	2–0	MO Béjaïa	El Harrach
15:00	Younes 53'; Aït Ouamar 85'	Report; Live TV: None		Stadium: Stade 1er Novembre 1954; Referee: Boukhalfa, Zerhouni, Etchiali

27 November 2015 Round 13	MO Béjaïa	2–1	DRB Tadjenanet	Béjaïa
16:00	Salhi 42'; Hamzaoui 85' (pen.)	Report; Live TV: TV Tamazight 4	75' Hadded	Stadium: Stade de l'Unité Maghrébine; Referee: Ghorbal, Hadj Saïd, Benali

12 December 2015 Round 14	MC Alger	1–0	MO Béjaïa	Bologhine
16:00	Hachoud 77' (pen.)	Report; Live TV: None		Stadium: Stade Omar Hamadi; Referee: Abid Charef, Tamen, Boulfelfel

25 December 2015 Round 15	MO Béjaïa	3–1	NA Hussein Dey	Béjaïa
16:00	Lakhdari 12', 56'; Ndoye 72' (pen.)	Report; Live TV: TV Tamazight 4 / Algérie 3	10' Herida	Stadium: Stade de l'Unité Maghrébine; Referee: Arab, Bioud, Hamlaoui

16 January 2016 Round 16	MO Béjaïa	2–1	RC Arbaâ	Béjaïa
16:00	Ndoye 12'; Zerdab 28' (pen.)	Report; Live TV: None	33' Mahsas	Stadium: Stade de l'Unité Maghrébine; Referee: Boukhalfa, Benali, Zerhouni

23 January 2016 Round 17	JS Kabylie	1–1	MO Béjaïa	Tizi Ouzou
16:00	Diawara 39'	Report; Live TV: Algérie 3	69' Ndoye	Stadium: Stade 1er Novembre 1954; Referee: Boukouassa, Brahim, Bounoua

30 January 2016 Round 18	MO Béjaïa	1–0	MC Oran	Béjaïa
16:00	Belkacemi 16'	Report; Live TV: None		Stadium: Stade de l'Unité Maghrébine; Referee: Achouri, Boulfelfel, Benhamouda

5 February 2016 Round 19	CS Constantine	1–0	MO Béjaïa	Constantine
16:00	Bezzaz 48' (pen.)	Report; Live TV: Canal Algérie		Stadium: Stade Mohamed Hamlaoui; Referee: Ghorbal, Itchiali, Hadj Said

9 February 2016 Round 20	MO Béjaïa	0–0	ES Sétif	Béjaïa
16:00		Report; Live TV: None		Stadium: Stade de l'Unité Maghrébine; Referee: Abid Charef, Tamen, Boulfelfel

23 February 2016 Round 21	MO Béjaïa	0–1	USM Alger	Béjaïa
16:00		Report; Live TV: None	83' (pen.) Meftah	Stadium: Stade de l'Unité Maghrébine; Attendance: 0 (close doors); Referee: Benouza, Serradj, Zerhouni

5 March 2016 Round 22	CR Belouizdad	1–3	MO Béjaïa	Belouizdad
16:00	Youcef 4'	Report; Live TV: None	54' Hamzaoui; 70' Belkacemi; 87' (pen.) Zerdab	Stadium: Stade 20 Août 1955; Referee: Achouri, Benhamouda, Idir

26 March 2016 Round 23	MO Béjaïa	1–1	RC Relizane	Béjaïa
18:00	Zerdab 31' (pen.)	Report; Live TV: None	27' Kherbache	Stadium: Stade de l'Unité Maghrébine; Attendance: 0 (close doors); Referee: Necib, Labioud, Maghlout

2 April 2016 Round 24	ASM Oran	1–5	MO Béjaïa	Oran
16:00	El Ghomari 21'	Report; Live TV: None	32', 36', 51' Ndoye; 50' Zerdab; 88' Khadir	Stadium: Stade Habib Bouakeul; Referee: S. Aouina, Benaissa, T. Aouina

15 April 2016 Round 25	MO Béjaïa	1–1	USM Blida	Béjaïa
18:00	Lakhdari 90'	Report; Live TV: None	67' Bedrane	Stadium: Stade de l'Unité Maghrébine; Referee: Houasnia, Salaouadji, Tazrout

23 April 2016 Round 26	JS Saoura	1–0	MO Béjaïa	Béchar
18:00	Maaziz 37'	Report; Live TV: None		Stadium: Stade 20 Août 1955; Referee: Achouri, Benhamouda, Amri

30 April 2016 Round 27	MO Béjaïa	0–0	USM El Harrach	Béjaïa
16:00		Report; Live TV: None		Stadium: Stade de l'Unité Maghrébine; Referee: Abid Charef, Boulfelfel, Isaad

13 May 2016 Round 28	DRB Tadjenanet	1–0	MO Béjaïa	Tadjenanet
17:30	Guitoune 73'	Report; Live TV: TV Tamazight 4		Stadium: Lahoua Smaïl Stadium; Referee: Boukhalfa, Zerhouni, Benali

20 May 2016 Round 29	MO Béjaïa	2–0	MC Alger	Béjaïa
17:30	Zerdab 50', 67'	Report; Live TV: None		Stadium: Stade de l'Unité Maghrébine; Referee: Zouaoui, Kechida, Halitim

27 May 2016 Round 30	NA Hussein Dey	0–0	MO Béjaïa	Belouizdad
17:30		Report; Live TV: None		Stadium: Stade 20 Août 1955; Referee: Benouza, Omari, Ayad

== Algerian Cup ==
19 December 2015 Round of 64	MC Oran	1–2	MO Béjaïa	Oran
16:00	Larbi 77' (pen.)		Yaya 14', 90'	Stadium: Stade Ahmed Zabana; Referee: Boukouassa, Rachedi, Bounoua

9 January 2016 Round of 32	MO Béjaïa	1–1 (a.e.t.) (3–1 p)	JS Djijel	Béjaïa
16:00	Ndoye 104'		118' Zine Mehdi	Stadium: Stade de l'Unité Maghrébine; Referee: Houasnia, Azrine, Tazrout

20 February 2016 Round of 16	MO Béjaïa	1–2 (a.e.t.)	NA Hussein Dey	Béjaïa
16:00	Ndoye 58'		16', 91' Benaldjia	Stadium: Stade de l'Unité Maghrébine; Referee: Boukouassa, Brahim, Rachedi

== Algerian Super Cup ==
1 November 2015	ES Sétif	1–0	MO Béjaïa	Constantine
16:00	Belameiri 84'	Report		Stadium: Stade Mohamed Hamlaoui; Attendance: 15.000; Referee: Mokhtar Amalou

== CAF Champions League ==
=== Preliminary round ===
14 February 2016 first leg	Ashanti Gold (Ghana)	1–0	(Algeria) MO Béjaïa	Obuasi
15:00 UTC±0	Tijani 61'			Stadium: Len Clay Stadium; Referee: Jean Ouattara (Burkina Faso)

28 February 2016 Second leg	MO Béjaïa (Algeria)	3–1	(Ghana) Ashanti Gold	Béjaïa
18:00 UTC+1	Yakubu 10' (o.g.); Khadir 58'; Hamzaoui 61'		Osei 40'	Stadium: Stade de l'Unité Maghrébine; Referee: Sabri Mohamed Fadul (Sudan)

=== First round ===
12 March 2016 first leg	Club Africain (Tunisia)	1–0	(Algeria) MO Béjaïa	Radès
17:00 UTC+1	Chenihi 17'			Stadium: Stade Olympique de Radès; Referee: Louis Hakizimana (Rwanda)

20 March 2016 Second leg	MO Béjaïa (Algeria)	2–0	(Tunisia) Club Africain	Béjaïa
18:00 UTC+1	Ndoye 59' (pen.); Betorangal 64'			Stadium: Stade de l'Unité Maghrébine; Attendance: 18,000; Referee: Rédouane Jiyed (Morocco)

=== Second round ===
9 April 2016 first leg	Zamalek (Egypt)	2–0	(Algeria) MO Béjaïa	Cairo
20:00 UTC+2	Kahraba 58'; Hamoudi 81'			Stadium: Petro Sport Stadium; Referee: Davies Omweno (Kenya)

19 April 2016 Second leg	MO Béjaïa (Algeria)	1–1	(Egypt) Zamalek	Béjaïa
18:00 UTC+1	Yaya 56'		Hamoudi 88'	Stadium: Stade de l'Unité Maghrébine; Referee: Youssef Essrayri (Tunisia)

== CAF Confederation Cup ==
=== Play-off round ===
7 May 2016 first leg	MO Béjaïa (Algeria)	0–0	(Tunisia) Espérance de Tunis	Béjaïa
18:00 UTC+1		Report		Stadium: Stade de l'Unité Maghrébine; Referee: Malang Diedhiou (Senegal)

17 May 2016 Second leg	Espérance de Tunis (Tunisia)	1–1	(Algeria) MO Béjaïa	Radès
18:00 UTC+1	Chaalali 29'	Report	Ndoye 33'	Stadium: Stade Olympique de Radès; Referee: Gehad Grisha (Egypt)

=== group stage ===
Pos	Team	Pld	W	D	L	GF	GA	GD	Pts	Qualification	TPM	MOB	MED	YAN
1	(Democratic Republic of the Congo) TP Mazembe	6	4	1	1	10	5	+5	13	Knockout stage	—	1–0	3–1	3–1
2	(Algeria) MO Béjaïa	6	2	2	2	2	2	0	8	Knockout stage	0–0	—	1–0	1–0
3	(Ghana) Medeama	6	2	2	2	8	8	0	8		3–2	0–0	—	3–1
4	(Tanzania) Young Africans	6	1	1	4	4	9	−5	4		0–1	1–0	1–1	—

Source: CAF
Rules for classification: Group stage tiebreakers

19 June 2016 Matchday 1	MO Béjaïa (Algeria)	1–0	(Tanzania) Young Africans	Béjaïa
22:15 UTC+1	Salhi 20'			Stadium: Stade de l'Unité Maghrébine; Referee: Bouchaïb El Ahrach (Morocco)

29 June 2016 Matchday 2	Medeama (Ghana)	0–0	(Algeria) MO Béjaïa	Sekondi-Takoradi
15:00 UTC+0				Stadium: Sekondi-Takoradi Stadium; Referee: Daniel Bennett (South Africa)

== Squad information ==
=== Playing statistics ===
No.	Pos	Nat	Player	Total		Ligue 1		Algerian Cup		Super Cup		Champions League		Confederation Cup	
No.	Pos	Nat	Player	Apps	Goals	Apps	Goals	Apps	Goals	Apps	Goals	Apps	Goals	Apps	Goals
Goalkeepers
1	GK	(Algeria) ALG	Amara Daïf	3	0	2	0	0	0	0	0	1	0	0	0
16	GK	(Algeria) ALG	Chamseddine Rahmani	44	0	30	0	3	0	1	0	6	0	4	0
Defenders
3	DF	(Algeria) ALG	Abdelkader Messaoudi	30	0	20	0	2	0	1	0	4	0	3	0
29	DF	(Algeria) ALG	Maamar Youcef	11	1	10	1	0	0	1	0	0	0	0	0
24	DF	(Algeria) ALG	Lyes Boukria	19	1	11	1	2	0	0	0	6	0	0	0
5	DF	(Algeria) ALG	Zidane Mebarakou	21	0	12	0	1	0	0	0	6	0	2	0
21	DF	(Algeria) ALG	Adel Lakhdari	32	4	22	4	3	0	0	0	3	0	4	0
2	DF	(Algeria) ALG	Amir Aguid	11	0	8	0	1	0	0	0	2	0	0	0
23	DF	(Algeria) ALG	Sofiane Baouali	25	0	18	0	0	0	0	0	5	0	2	0
14	DF	(Algeria) ALG	Sofiane Khadir	26	2	16	1	2	0	1	0	4	1	3	0
28	DF	(Algeria) ALG	Yacine Salhi	38	3	27	2	3	0	1	0	3	0	4	1
26	DF	(Algeria) ALG	Salim Benali	30	0	23	0	2	0	1	0	0	0	4	0
64	DF	(Algeria) ALG	Yanis Mouhli	4	0	2	0	0	0	0	0	0	0	2	0
Midfielders
22	MF	(Algeria) ALG	Zahir Zerdab	39	7	28	7	3	0	1	0	5	0	2	0
20	MF	(Chad) CHA	Morgan Betorangal	17	1	9	0	1	0	0	0	5	1	2	0
27	MF	(Algeria) ALG	Karim Meliani	3	0	3	0	0	0	0	0	0	0	0	0
8	MF	(Algeria) ALG	Abou El Kacem Hadji	4	0	4	0	0	0	0	0	0	0	0	0
4	MF	(Algeria) ALG	Ismail Bentayeb	13	0	7	0	1	0	0	0	2	0	3	0
20	MF	(Algeria) ALG	Saad Tedjar	12	0	11	0	0	0	1	0	0	0	0	0
15	MF	(Mali) MLI	Soumaila Sidibe	35	0	24	0	3	0	1	0	4	0	3	0
7	MF	(Algeria) ALG	Djamel Chettal	8	0	7	0	0	0	1	0	0	0	0	0
6	MF	(Algeria) ALG	Malek Ferhat	16	0	9	0	0	0	0	0	5	0	2	0
	MF	(Algeria) ALG	Mohamed Athmani	22	0	12	0	2	0	0	0	4	0	4	0
	MF	(Algeria) ALG	Samir Hebbache	1	0	1	0	0	0	0	0	0	0	0	0
	MF	(Algeria) ALG	Mohand Bekouche	1	0	1	0	0	0	0	0	0	0	0	0
Forwards
9	FW	(Algeria) ALG	Okacha Hamzaoui	25	1	16	0	3	0	1	0	5	1	0	0
17	FW	(Algeria) ALG	Billel Mebarki	11	3	11	3	0	0	0	0	0	0	0	0
10	FW	(Algeria) ALG	Faouzi Yaya	32	4	22	1	3	2	1	0	4	1	2	0
11	FW	(Algeria) ALG	Ismail Belkacemi	29	1	22	1	2	0	1	0	1	0	3	0
67	FW	(Algeria) ALG	Benaouda Bendjelloul	6	0	5	0	0	0	0	0	0	0	1	0
19	FW	(Senegal) SEN	Mohamed Waliou Ndoye	36	13	24	9	3	2	1	0	6	1	2	1
Players transferred out during the season

Last updated: 26 November 2017

=== Goalscorers ===
Includes all competitive matches. The list is sorted alphabetically by surname when total goals are equal.

No.	Nat.	Player	Pos.	L 1	AC	SC	CL 1	CC 3	TOTAL
19	(Senegal)	Mohamed Waliou Ndoye	FW	9	2	0	1	1	13
22	(Algeria)	Zahir Zerdab	MF	7	0	0	0	0	7
10	(Algeria)	Faouzi Yaya	FW	1	2	0	1	0	4
21	(Algeria)	Adel Lakhdari	DF	4	0	0	0	0	4
17	(Algeria)	Billel Mebarki	FW	3	0	0	0	0	3
28	(Algeria)	Yacine Salhi	DF	2	0	0	0	1	3
14	(Algeria)	Sofiane Khadir	DF	1	0	0	1	0	2
9	(Algeria)	Okacha Hamzaoui	FW	0	0	0	1	0	1
11	(Algeria)	Ismail Belkacemi	FW	1	0	0	0	0	1
20	(Chad)	Morgan Betorangal	MF	0	0	0	1	0	1
29	(Algeria)	Maamar Youcef	DF	1	0	0	0	0	1
24	(Algeria)	Lyes Boukria	DF	1	0	0	0	0	1
Own Goals				0	0	0	1	0	1
Totals				33	4	0	6	2	45

== Players ==
Note: Flags indicate national team as defined under FIFA eligibility rules; some limited exceptions apply. Players may hold more than one non-FIFA nationality.

No.	Pos.	Nation	Player
1	GK	ALG	Amara Daïf
2	DF	ALG	Amir Aguid
3	DF	ALG	Abdelkader Messaoudi
5	DF	ALG	Zidane Mebarakou
6	MF	ALG	Malek Ferhat
7	FW	ALG	Djamel Eddine Chettal
8	MF	ALG	Abou El Kacem Hadji
9	MF	ALG	Okacha Hamzaoui
10	FW	ALG	Faouzi Yaya
11	FW	ALG	Ismail Belkacemi
13	MF	SEN	Fallou Gallas
14	MF	ALG	Sofiane Khadir
15	MF	MLI	Soumaila Sidibe
16	GK	ALG	Chamseddine Rahmani
17	FW	ALG	Billel Mebarki
19	FW	SEN	Mohamed Waliou Ndoye

No.	Pos.	Nation	Player
20	MF	ALG	Saad Tedjar
21	DF	ALG	Adel Lakhdari
22	MF	ALG	Zahir Zerdab
23	DF	ALG	Sofiane Baouali
24	DF	ALG	Lyes Boukria
26	DF	ALG	Salim Benali
27	MF	ALG	Karim Meliani
28	DF	ALG	Yacine Salhi
29	DF	ALG	Maamar Youcef
64	MF	ALG	Yanis Mouhli
67	MF	ALG	Benaouda Bendjelloul
74	GK	ALG	Yacine Sidi-Salah
80	DF	ALG	Farès Betraoui
90	FW	ALG	Messipsa Rachedi

== Transfers ==
=== In ===
Date	Pos	Player	From club	Transfer fee	Source
11 June 2015	FW	(Algeria) Billel Mebarki	USM El Harrach	Undisclosed	
14 June 2015	MF	(Algeria) Abou El Kacem Hadji	CS Constantine	Undisclosed	
15 June 2015	GK	(Algeria) Amara Daïf	ASO Chlef	Free transfer	
16 June 2015	MF	(Algeria) Saad Tedjar	ASO Chlef	Undisclosed	
18 June 2015	DF	(Algeria) Maamar Youcef	RC Relizane	Undisclosed	
20 June 2015	DF	(Algeria) Adel Lakhdari	ASO Chlef	Free transfer	
22 June 2015	DF	(Algeria) Sofiane Khadir	MC Alger	Free transfer	
22 June 2015	MF	(Algeria) Benaouda Bendjelloul	ASM Oran	Undisclosed	
1 July 2015	DF	(Algeria) Yanis Mouhli	Reserve team	First Professional Contract	
6 July 2015	DF	(Algeria) Lyes Boukria	ES Sétif	Free transfer	
13 July 2015	MF	(Algeria) (France) Karim Meliani	ASO Chlef	Free transfer	
1 July 2015	FW	(Algeria) Ismail Belkacemi	USMM Hadjout	€20,000	
1 July 2015	FW	(Senegal) Mohamed Waliou Ndoye	(Senegal) Stade de Mbour	Undisclosed	
20 December 2015	MF	(Chad) (France) Morgan Betorangal	Unattached	Free transfer	
2 January 2016	MF	(Algeria) Mohamed Yacine Athmani	USM Khenchela	Free transfer	
3 January 2016	MF	(Algeria) Ismail Bentayeb	MC El Eulma	Undisclosed	

=== Out ===
Date	Pos	Player	To club	Transfer fee	Source
26 December 2015	MF	(Algeria) Saad Tedjar	ASO Chlef	Free transfer	
