= List of Algerian football transfers summer 2016 =

This is a list of Algerian football transfers in the 2016 summer transfer window by club. clubs in the 2016–17 Algerian Ligue Professionnelle 1 are included.

== Ligue Professionnelle 1 ==
=== CA Batna ===
In:

No.	Pos.	Nation	Player
—	MF	ALG	Farid Daoud (from (Algeria) DRB Tadjenanet)
—	DF	ALG	Mohamed Amrane (from (Algeria) DRB Tadjenanet)

Out:

No.	Pos.	Nation	Player

=== CR Belouizdad ===
In:

No.	Pos.	Nation	Player
—	DF	ALG	Rabah Aïch (from (Algeria) MC Oran)
—	MF	ALG	Nassim Bouchema (from (Algeria) USM Alger)
4	DF	ALG	Mohamed Naamani (from (Algeria) ASO Chlef)
30	GK	ALG	Abdelkader Salhi (on loan from (Algeria) ASO Chlef)
20	DF	ALG	Sofiane Khelili (from (Saudi Arabia) Ettifaq)

Out:

No.	Pos.	Nation	Player
30	GK	ALG	Malik Asselah (to (Algeria) JS Kabylie)
9	FW	ALG	Hichem Nekkache (to (Algeria) MC Alger)
17	DF	ALG	Zakaria Bencherifa (to (Algeria) MO Béjaïa)
—	DF	CMR	Gilles Ngomo (Unattached)
—	DF	ALG	Sofiane Khelili (to (Saudi Arabia) Ettifaq)

=== CS Constantine ===
In:

No.	Pos.	Nation	Player
—	MF	ALG	Mohamed Taïb (from (Algeria) USM Alger)
—	MF	ALG	Karim Baïteche (from (Algeria) USM Alger)
—	DF	ALG	Houcine Benayada (from (Algeria) USM Alger)
—	FW	CIV	Manucho (on loan from (Algeria) USM Alger)
9	FW	ALG	Mohamed Amine Aoudia (from (Algeria) USM Alger)
—	MF	ALG	Toufik Zerara (from (Algeria) ES Sétif)
—	MF	ALG	El Hedi Belameiri (from (Algeria) ES Sétif)
—	DF	ALG	Sofiane Benbraham (from (Algeria) MC Alger)
—	FW	ALG	Abdenour Belkheir (from (Algeria) JS Saoura)
—	MF	ALG	Messaoud Gharbi (from (Algeria) USM El Harrach)

Out:

No.	Pos.	Nation	Player
—	DF	ALG	Ahmed Messadia (to (Algeria) MO Béjaïa)
—	MF	MAD	Paulin Voavy (to (Egypt) Misr Lel-Makkasa)
—	FW	CIV	Koro Issa Ahmed Koné (Unattached)
—	FW	ALG	Hamza Boulemdaïs (to (Algeria) ES Sétif)
—	DF	ALG	Farid Cheklam (to (Algeria) MO Béjaïa)
—	DF	ALG	Zineddine Mekkaoui (to (Algeria) RC Relizane)
—	FW	MTN	Cheikh Moulaye Ahmed (to (Lebanon) Al-Ansar)
—	MF	ALG	Sabri Gharbi (to (Algeria) Olympique de Médéa)
—	MF	ALG	Belkacem Remache (to (Algeria) RC Relizane)

=== DRB Tadjenanet ===
In:

No.	Pos.	Nation	Player
—	DF	ALG	Arslane Mazari (from (Algeria) USM Alger)
—	MF	ALG	Djamel Chettal (from (Algeria) USM Alger)
—	MF	ALG	Ibrahim Si Ammar (from (Algeria) MC El Eulma)
—	GK	ALG	Oussama Litim (from (Algeria) USM Blida)
—	MF	ALG	Tayeb Maroci (from (Algeria) USM Blida)
—	GK	ALG	Jonathan Matijas (from (Algeria) MC Alger)
—	DF	ALG	Mohamed Billel Benaldjia (from (Algeria) USM El Harrach)
—	DF	ALG	Djilali Terbah (from (Algeria) JS Saoura)
—	FW	ALG	Abdelouahab Djahel (from (Algeria) AS Khroub)
—	FW	ALG	Farès Cheniguer (from (Algeria) JSM Skikda)
—	DF	ALG	Ishak Bouda (from (Algeria) RC Relizane)
—	DF	ALG	Fourloul Senoussi (from (Algeria) MC Saïda)

Out:

No.	Pos.	Nation	Player
10	MF	ALG	Amir Sayoud (to (Algeria) USM Alger)
—	MF	CMR	Azougha Tembeng (loan return to (Algeria) MC El Eulma)
—	FW	CGO	Lorry Nkolo (Unattached)
—	MF	ALG	Farid Daoud (to (Algeria) CA Batna)
—	FW	ALG	Abdellah Daouadji (loan return to (Algeria) Paradou AC)
—	DF	ALG	Antara Khedidja (retired)
—	MF	ALG	Abdelmalik Hadef (to (Algeria) JSM Bejaia)
—	DF	ALG	Mohamed Amrane (to (Algeria) CA Batna)
—	GK	ALG	Khairi Barki (to (Algeria) ES Sétif)

=== ES Sétif ===
In:

No.	Pos.	Nation	Player
—	FW	ALG	Rachid Nadji (from (Algeria) USM Alger)
24	FW	ALG	Mohamed Khoutir Ziti (from (Algeria) JS Kabylie)
15	DF	ALG	Abdelkader Bedrane (from (Algeria) USM Blida)
—	FW	ALG	Hamza Boulemdaïs (from (Algeria) CS Constantine)
—	MF	ALG	Mohamed Islam Bakir (from (Algeria) RC Arbaâ)
—	MF	CMR	Azougha Tembeng (on loan from (Algeria) MC El Eulma)
—	GK	ALG	Khairi Barki (from (Algeria) DRB Tadjenanet)
—	FW	ALG	Abdellah Daouadji (on loan from (Algeria) Paradou AC)

Out:

No.	Pos.	Nation	Player
5	MF	ALG	Mourad Delhoum (to (Algeria) MC Oran)
26	FW	ALG	Abdelmalek Ziaya (to (Algeria) JS Kabylie)
19	FW	CTA	Eudes Dagoulou (to (Saudi Arabia) Al-Wehda)
5	DF	ALG	Djamel Benlamri (to (Saudi Arabia) Al-Shabab FC)
—	MF	ALG	Toufik Zerara (to (Algeria) CS Constantine)
—	MF	ALG	El Hedi Belameiri (to (Algeria) CS Constantine)

=== JS Kabylie ===
In:

No.	Pos.	Nation	Player
2	DF	ALG	Saadi Redouani (from (Algeria) USM Alger)
30	GK	ALG	Malik Asselah (from (Algeria) CR Belouizdad)
26	FW	ALG	Abdelmalek Ziaya (from (Algeria) ES Sétif)
29	DF	ALG	Touhami Sebie (from (Algeria) JS Saoura)

Out:

No.	Pos.	Nation	Player
25	MF	ALG	Rachid Ferrahi (to (Algeria) MC Oran)
30	GK	ALG	Azzedine Doukha (to (Algeria) NA Hussein Dey)
7	FW	ALG	Saïd Ferguène (to (Algeria) NA Hussein Dey)
14	MF	ALG	Hocine Harrouche (to (Algeria) NA Hussein Dey)
24	FW	ALG	Mohamed Khoutir Ziti (to (Algeria) ES Sétif)
29	MF	ALG	Kamel Yesli (to (Algeria) MO Béjaïa)
8	MF	ALG	Faouzi Rahal (to (Algeria) MO Béjaïa)

=== JS Saoura ===
In:

No.	Pos.	Nation	Player
—	MF	ALG	Abderrahmane Bourdim (from (Algeria) USM Alger)

Out:

No.	Pos.	Nation	Player
15	MF	ALG	Ziri Hammar (to (Algeria) USM Alger)
29	DF	ALG	Touhami Sebie (to (Algeria) JS Kabylie)
—	FW	ALG	Abdenour Belkheir (to (Algeria) CS Constantine)
—	DF	ALG	Djilali Terbah (to (Algeria) DRB Tadjenanet)

=== MC Alger ===
In:

No.	Pos.	Nation	Player
6	DF	ALG	Brahim Boudebouda (from (Algeria) USM Alger)
18	FW	ALG	Mohamed Seguer (from (Algeria) USM Alger)
16	GK	ALG	Kheireddine Boussouf (from (Algeria) NA Hussein Dey)
21	FW	ALG	Zahir Zerdab (from (Algeria) MO Béjaïa)
19	FW	ALG	Hadj Bouguèche (from (Algeria) USM El Harrach)
11	FW	ALG	Anter Djamaouni (from (Algeria) ASM Oran)
9	FW	ALG	Hichem Nekkache (from (Algeria) CR Belouizdad)

Out:

No.	Pos.	Nation	Player
21	DF	FRA	Toufik Zeghdane (to (Algeria) USM Alger)
—	FW	ALG	Lamine Abid (loan return to (Algeria) USM El Harrach)
—	GK	ALG	Jonathan Matijas (to (Algeria) DRB Tadjenanet)

=== MC Oran ===
In:

No.	Pos.	Nation	Player
20	DF	ALG	Amir Aguid (from (Algeria) MO Béjaïa)
25	DF	ALG	Salim Benali (from (Algeria) MO Béjaïa)
6	DF	ALG	Adel Gafaiti (from (England) Norwich City)
15	DF	ALG	Zine El Abidine Sebbah (from (Algeria) ASM Oran)
10	MF	ALG	Mohamed El Amine Aouad (from (Algeria) ASM Oran)
8	MF	ALG	Mohamed Bentiba (from (Algeria) ASM Oran)
21	MF	ALG	Omar Boudoumi (from (Algeria) ASM Oran)
5	MF	ALG	Mourad Delhoum (from (Algeria) ES Sétif)
25	MF	ALG	Rachid Ferrahi (from (Algeria) JS Kabylie)
24	MF	ALG	Hamza Heriat (from (Algeria) USM Blida)
23	FW	ALG	Hicham Chérif (from (Algeria) USM Blida)
9	FW	ALG	Mohamed Souibaâh (from (Algeria) Paradou AC)

Out:

No.	Pos.	Nation	Player
—	DF	ALG	Rabah Aïch (to (Algeria) CR Belouizdad)
—	DF	ALG	Hassouna Benchaïb (Unattached)
—	DF	ALG	Mohamed Benyahia (to (Algeria) USM Alger)
—	DF	ALG	Nabil Yaâlaoui (to (Algeria) CA Bordj Bou Arreridj)
—	MF	ALG	Sofiane Chlaoua (to (Algeria) ASM Oran)
—	MF	ALG	Hacène El Okbi (to (Egypt) Al Ittihad Alexandria)
—	MF	ALG	Walid Hellal (to (Algeria) RC Relizane)
—	MF	ALG	Khaled Lemmouchia (retired)
—	FW	ALG	Merouane Dahar (to (Algeria) USM El Harrach)
—	DF	ALG	Chafik Bourzama (to (Algeria) Unattached)
—	DF	ALG	Hamza Hamdadou (to (Algeria) MC El Eulma)
—	DF	ALG	Abdelmalek Merbah (to (Algeria) JSM Béjaïa)
—	MF	ALG	Seddik Berradja (to (Algeria) ASM Oran)
—	MF	ALG	Kamel Larbi (Unattached)
—	FW	ALG	Walid Athmani (to (Algeria) USM El Harrach)
—	FW	LBY	Mohamed Zubya (to (Tunisia) ES Tunis)

=== MO Béjaïa ===
In:

No.	Pos.	Nation	Player
29	MF	ALG	Kamel Yesli (from (Algeria) JS Kabylie)
—	DF	ALG	Ahmed Messadia (from (Algeria) CS Constantine)
—	DF	FRA	Youcef Touati (from (France) FC Chambly)
17	DF	ALG	Zakaria Bencherifa (from (Algeria) CR Belouizdad)
8	MF	ALG	Faouzi Rahal (from (Algeria) JS Kabylie)
—	DF	ALG	Farid Cheklam (from (Algeria) CS Constantine)

Out:

No.	Pos.	Nation	Player
20	DF	ALG	Amir Aguid (to (Algeria) MC Oran)
25	DF	ALG	Salim Benali (to (Algeria) MC Oran)
21	FW	ALG	Zahir Zerdab (to (Algeria) MC Alger)
—	FW	SEN	Mohamed Waliou Ndoye (to (Tunisia) CS Sfaxien)

=== NA Hussein Dey ===
In:

No.	Pos.	Nation	Player
26	MF	ALG	Walid Ardji (from (Algeria) USM Alger)
6	MF	ALG	Hocine El Orfi (from (Algeria) USM Alger)
24	DF	ALG	Youcef Benamara (from (Algeria) USM Blida)
7	FW	ALG	Saïd Ferguène (from (Algeria) JS Kabylie)
14	MF	ALG	Hocine Harrouche (from (Algeria) JS Kabylie)
13	FW	ALG	Lamine Abid (from (Algeria) USM El Harrach)

Out:

No.	Pos.	Nation	Player
16	GK	ALG	Kheireddine Boussouf (to (Algeria) MC Alger)

=== Olympique de Médéa ===
In:

No.	Pos.	Nation	Player
—	MF	ALG	Sabri Gharbi (from (Algeria) CS Constantine)

Out:

No.	Pos.	Nation	Player

=== RC Relizane ===
In:

No.	Pos.	Nation	Player
—	MF	ALG	Walid Hellal (from (Algeria) MC Oran)
—	DF	ALG	Zineddine Mekkaoui (from (Algeria) CS Constantine)
—	MF	ALG	Belkacem Remache (from (Algeria) CS Constantine)

Out:

No.	Pos.	Nation	Player
—	MF	ALG	Abderrahmane Bourdim (loan return to (Algeria) USM Alger)
—	DF	ALG	Ishak Bouda (to (Algeria) DRB Tadjenanet)

=== USM Alger ===
In:

No.	Pos.	Nation	Player
10	MF	ALG	Amir Sayoud (from (Algeria) DRB Tadjenanet)
31	DF	ALG	Raouf Benguit (on loan from (Algeria) Paradou AC)
26	MF	FRA	Reda Bellahcene (from (France) FC Saint-Louis Neuweg)
29	FW	CIV	Ghislain Guessan (on loan from (Algeria) RC Arbaâ)
11	FW	ALG	Abderrahmane Meziane (loan return from (Algeria) RC Arbaâ)
—	FW	CIV	Manucho (loan return from (Algeria) RC Relizane)
—	DF	ALG	Nazim Aklil (loan return from (Algeria) JSM Skikda)
—	MF	ALG	Abderrahmane Bourdim (loan return from (Algeria) RC Relizane)
—	MF	ALG	Mohamed Taïb (loan return from (Algeria) RC Arbaâ)
—	DF	ALG	Ibrahim Bekakchi (loan return from (Algeria) CA Bordj Bou Arréridj)
19	MF	FRA	Abel Khaled (from (Algeria) RC Arbaâ)
7	MF	FRA	Rafik Bouderbal (from (France) AS Lyon-Duchère)
15	MF	ALG	Ziri Hammar (from (Algeria) JS Saoura)
5	DF	ALG	Mohamed Benyahia (from (Algeria) MC Oran)
21	DF	FRA	Toufik Zeghdane (from (Algeria) MC Alger)

Out:

No.	Pos.	Nation	Player
—	DF	ALG	Saadi Redouani (to (Algeria) JS Kabylie)
—	DF	ALG	Arslane Mazari (to (Algeria) DRB Tadjenanet)
—	MF	ALG	Djamel Chettal (to (Algeria) DRB Tadjenanet)
—	MF	ALG	Mohamed Taïb (to (Algeria) CS Constantine)
—	MF	ALG	Karim Baïteche (to (Algeria) CS Constantine)
—	DF	ALG	Houcine Benayada (to (Algeria) CS Constantine)
—	FW	CIV	Manucho (on loan to (Algeria) CS Constantine)
—	MF	ALG	Nassim Bouchema (to (Algeria) CR Belouizdad)
—	FW	ALG	Rachid Nadji (to (Algeria) ES Sétif)
—	DF	ALG	Brahim Boudebouda (to (Algeria) MC Alger)
—	FW	ALG	Mohamed Amine Aoudia (to (Algeria) CS Constantine)
—	MF	ALG	Zinedine Ferhat (to (France) Le Havre AC)
—	MF	ALG	Hocine El Orfi (to (Algeria) NA Hussein Dey)
—	FW	ALG	Mohamed Seguer (to (Algeria) MC Alger)
—	MF	ALG	Abderrahmane Bourdim (on loan to (Algeria) JS Saoura)
—	MF	ALG	Oualid Ardji (on loan to (Algeria) NA Hussein Dey)

=== USM Bel-Abbès ===
In:

No.	Pos.	Nation	Player

Out:

No.	Pos.	Nation	Player

=== USM El Harrach ===
In:

No.	Pos.	Nation	Player
—	FW	ALG	Lamine Abid (loan return from (Algeria) MC Alger)
—	FW	ALG	Merouane Dahar (from (Algeria) MC Oran)
—	FW	ALG	Walid Athmani (from (Algeria) MC Oran)

Out:

No.	Pos.	Nation	Player
13	FW	ALG	Lamine Abid (to (Algeria) NA Hussein Dey)
—	MF	ALG	Messaoud Gharbi (to (Algeria) CS Constantine)
—	DF	ALG	Mohamed Billel Benaldjia (to (Algeria) DRB Tadjenanet)
