= 2015 Algerian Super Cup =

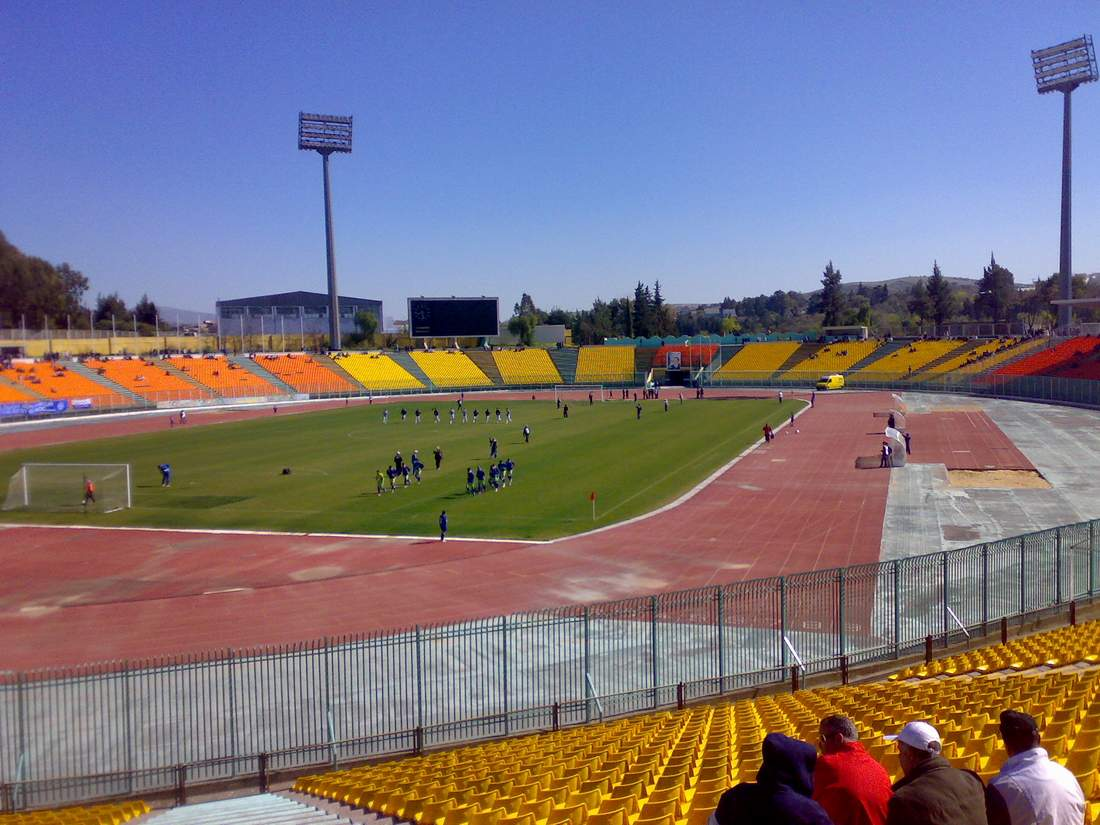
- Chahid Hamlaoui Stadium hosted the match
ES Sétif	MO Béjaïa
Ligue 1	Algerian Cup
1	0
- Date: 1 November 2015
- Venue: Chahid Hamlaoui Stadium, Constantine
- Referee: Mokhtar Amalou
- Attendance: 15,000

The 2015 Algerian Super Cup was the 9th edition of Algerian Super Cup, a football match contested by the winners of the 2014–15 Algerian Ligue Professionnelle 1 and 2014–15 Algerian Cup competitions. The match was played on November 1, 2015 at Chahid Hamlaoui Stadium in Constantine. Ligue 1 winners ES Sétif won the match 1–0 against Algerian Cup winners MO Béjaïa. The lone goal was in the 84th minute by El Hedi Belameiri.

== Match details ==
1 November 2015
16:00

ES Sétif	1–0	MO Béjaïa
Belameiri 84'	Report

Chahid Hamlaoui Stadium, Constantine
Attendance: 15,000
Referee: Mokhtar Amalou

GK	1	(Algeria) Sofiane Khedairia
DF	2	(Algeria) Sofiane Bouchar
FW	20	(Algeria) Ryad Kenniche
DF	17	(Algeria) Djamel Benlamri	(yellow card) 48'
DF	12	(Algeria) Fares Hachi
MF	21	(Algeria) Issam Baouz
MF	6	(Madagascar) Ibrahim Amada	(yellow card) 63'
MF	19	(Central African Republic) Eudes Dagoulou		(substituted off) 60'
FW	13	(Algeria) Sid Ali Lamri
MF	27	(Algeria) Zakaria Haddouche		(substituted off) 77'
FW	11	(Algeria) Mohamed Benyettou		(substituted off) 90+2'
Substitutes :
MF	57	(Algeria) El Hedi Belameiri		(substituted on) 60'
FW	9	(Algeria) Abdelmalek Ziaya		(substituted on) 77'
MF	14	(Algeria) Mourad Delhoum		(substituted on) 90+2'
Manager :
(Algeria) Kheïreddine Madoui

GK	16	(Algeria) Chamseddine Rahmani
MF	14	(Algeria) Sofiane Khadir	(yellow card) 61'
DF	3	(Algeria) Abdelkader Messaoudi	(yellow card) 86'
DF	26	(Algeria) Salim Benali	(yellow card) 36'
DF	29	(Algeria) Maamar Youcef
DF	28	(Algeria) Yassine Salhi		(substituted off) 87'
MF	15	(Mali) Soumaila Sidibe
FW	11	(Algeria) Ismaïl Belkacemi		(substituted off) 68'
FW	10	(Algeria) Faouzi Yaya
MF	22	(Algeria) Zahir Zerdab		(substituted off) 87'
MF	9	(Algeria) Okacha Hamzaoui
Substitutes :
MF	20	(Algeria) Saad Tedjar		(substituted on) 87'
FW	7	(Algeria) Djamel Chettal		(substituted on) 87'
FW	19	(Senegal) Waliou Ndoye		(substituted on) 68'
Manager :
(Algeria) Abdelkader Amrani
