= 2014–15 Algerian Cup =

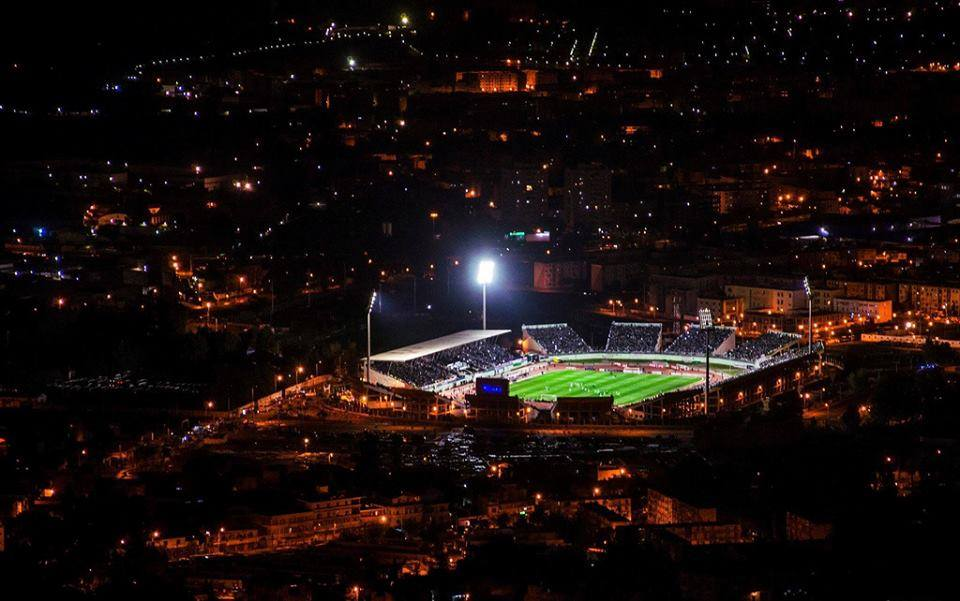
- Mustapha Tchaker Stadium hosted the final

Tournament details
- Country: Algeria
- Dates: 12 December 2014 – 1 May 2015
- Teams: 64 (as of first national round)

Final positions
- Champions: MO Béjaïa
- Runners-up: RC Arbaâ

Tournament statistics
- Matches played: 48
- Goals scored: 128 (2.67 per match)
- Top goal scorer(s): Sid Ali Yahia Cherif (3 goals); Salim Boumechra (3 goals) Kamel Zeghli (3 goals); Khalil Bouzit (3 goals)

The 2014–15 Algerian Cup was the 51st edition of the Algerian Cup. The winners were MO Béjaïa who qualified to the 2016 CAF Confederation Cup.

== Round of 64 ==
The round of 64 was held on 12 and 13 December 2014.

December 13, 2014	US Boukhadara	0 – 0 (a.e.t) (5 – 4 p)	US Oued Amizour	Stade Colonel Chabou Abdelkader, Annaba
14 h 00		Repport		Referee: Boulahbib, Benhamza, Kirani

December 13, 2014	AHM Hassi Messaoud	1 – 0	RC Relizane	Olympic Ouargla Stadium, Ouargla
14 h 00	Berrabah 45+3'	Repport		Attendance: 600; Referee: Tiouri, Dif, Saâdoune

December 12, 2014	NRB El Achir	1 – 0	OM Arzew	Stade 20 Août 1955, Bordj Bou Arréridj
14 h 30	Amer 31'	Repport		Referee: Hansal, Ikhlef, Kadem

December 13, 2014	MC El Eulma	3 – 2 (a.e.t)	A Bou Saada	Stade Messaoud Zougar, El Eulma
14 h 00	Kara 86'; Derrardja 90+4' (pen.); Kadri 105'	Repport	8' Mesbah; 65' Laâraf	Referee: Necib, Mekhlouf, Benaceur

December 12, 2014	MO Béjaïa	1 – 1 (a.e.t) (4 – 3 p)	JS Saoura	Stade de l'Unité Maghrébine, Béjaïa
16 h 00	Okacha Hamzaoui 90'	Repport	33' Jean Bapidi	Attendance: 0 Referee: Ghorbal, Serradj, Charchar

December 23, 2014	MO Constantine	1 – 3	ES Sétif	Stade Mohamed Hamlaoui, Constantine
16 h 00	Korichi 82'	Repport	20' (pen.) Benyettou; 28', 34' Younès	Attendance: Gherbal, Cherchar, Siradj

December 13, 2014	CRB Ouled Abdelkader	1 – 4	USM Alger	Stade Mohamed Boumezrag, Chlef
14 h 00	Roudouane 89'; Roudouane (yellow card) 85'	Repport	11' Boudebouda; 49' Andria; 74', 84' Nadji; (yellow card) 90+2' Seguer	Attendance: 2.000; Referee: Sekhraoui, Hammou, Saïdani

December 13, 2014	CR Zoubiria	0 – 1	ASO Chlef	Stade Imam Lyes de Médéa, Médéa
14 h 00		Repport	19' (pen.) Tedjar	Referee: Bouslimani, Touil, Remouche

December 12, 2014	MSP Batna	0 – 1	RC Arbaâ	Stade 1er Novembre 1954, Batna
14 h 30		Repport	89' Darfalou	Referee: Benouza, Omari, Ayad

December 13, 2014	JS Kabylie	3 – 1	CRB Dar El Beida	Stade 20 Août 1955, Algiers
16 h 00	Yadroudj 34', 46'; Si Ammar 89'	Repport	80' Zerrouk	Attendance: 0 Referee: Abid Charef, Atrous, Boulefelfel

December 12, 2014	NA Hussein Dey	2 – 1	AS Marsa	Stade 20 Août 1955, Algiers
16 h 00	Mourad Benayad 57', 75'	Repport	46' Tchamba	Referee: Rahmine, Benaissa, Kechida

December 15, 2014	USM Blida	1 – 2	CR Belouizdad	Stade Mohamed Boumezrag, Chlef
16 h 00	Badarane 83' (pen.)	Repport	60' (pen.), 79' Bougueroua	Attendance: 15.000; Referee: Bouhassoun, Bounoua, Rachedi

December 12, 2014	CRB Aïn Fakroun	1 – 0	O Tizi Rached	Stade Hassouna Zerdani, Oum El Bouaghi
14 h 30	Daira 73'	Repport		Referee: Ghoul, Siaffa, Boughaba

December 13, 2014	CS Constantine	2 – 1 (a.e.t)	MC Alger	Stade Mohamed Hamlaoui, Constantine
16 h 00	Boulemdaïs 23' (pen.); Guerabis 98'	Repport	9' (o.g.) Bouba	Attendance: 30.000; Referee: Mial, Semsoum, Idir

December 13, 2014	ASM Oran	2 – 1	NRB Touggourt	Stade Ahmed Zabana, Oran
14 h 00	Djemaouni 19', 32'	Repport	Bendakiche	Attendance: 300; Referee: Bouzerar, Yahi, Messaoudi

December 12, 2014	CA Kouba	2 – 1	AB Merouana	Stade Omar Benhaddad, Kouba
14 h 30	Kacem 75'; Chikh Adléne 98'	Repport	33' Bekhti	Referee: Nader, Messali, Belhocine

December 13, 2014	AS Khroub	1 – 2	MC Oran	Stade Abed Hamdani, El Khroub
14 h 00	Bouhekkak 69'	Repport	3' Hicham Chérif; 52' Nekkache	Referee: Helalchi, Boulekrinet, Doulèche

December 13, 2014	NSB Bouda	0 – 2	MB Hassasna	Adrar Olympic Stadium, Adrar
14 h 00		Repport	2' Fekira; 73' Brahimi	Referee: Daâlache, Ghazal, Ziani

December 12, 2014	USM Oran	1 – 0	ES Mostaganem	Stade Ahmed Zabana, Oran
16 h 00	Hmaida 8'	Repport		Attendance: 500; Referee: Bachir, Hadj Saïd, Abid

December 12, 2014	Hamra Annaba	0 – 2	USM Chéraga	Stade Colonel Chabou Abdelkader, Annaba
14 h 30		Repport	39' Hadj Kaci; 55' Khemmouche	Referee: Guitoum, Halitim, Djerrad

December 13, 2014	US Chaouia	2 – 1 (a.e.t)	MB Hassi Messaoud	Stade Hassouna Zerdani, Oum El Bouaghi
14 h 00	Demene 57'; Lamhene 115'	Repport	34' Rouighi	Referee: Aït Ameur, Rahmoune, Azzouz

December 12, 2014	O Médéa	3 – 0	JS Emir Abdelkader	Stade Imam Lyes de Médéa, Médéa
14 h 30	Drifel 47', 59'; Belekhdar 89' (o.g.)	Repport		Referee: Brahim, Aidaoui, Hamraoui

December 13, 2014	USM El Harrach	8 – 2	US Tighenif	Stade 1er Novembre 1954, Algiers
14 h 00	Laribi 2'; Amada 10' (pen.); Tiaiba 27' (pen.); Boumechra 25', 51', 80'; Harrag 73'; Hattabi 75'	Repport	55' Abderezak; 57' Meziane	Attendance: 2.000; Referee: Bahloul, Saâdi, Benmira

December 12, 2014	ES Guelma	1 – 1 (a.e.t) (5 – 4 p)	ERB Ouled Moussa	Stade Souidani Boujemaa, Guelma
14 h 30	Idou 42'	Repport	56' Bouhsane	Attendance: 10.000; Referee: Ibrir, Dilmi, Mezaache

December 13, 2014	NB El Kala	1 – 2	MC Saida	Stade El Hadjar, El Hadjar
14 h 00	Benyounes 88'	Repport	60' Soudani; 77' Motrani	Referee: Bouchouyou, Behat, Mehamel

December 13, 2014	USM Bel-Abbès	3 – 1	ES Araba	Stade 24 Fevrier 1956, Sidi Bel Abbes
14 h 00	Ogbi 17' (pen.); Choubani 32', 38'	Repport	59' Benhamou	Referee: Brahim, Rouag, Belbachir

December 12, 2014	ESM Koléa	3 – 0	CRB Tircine	Stade Mohamed Mouaza, Koléa
14 h 30	Brinis 2'; Kaboul 17' (pen.); Abdou 44'	Repport		Referee: Yahia, Amrane, Benadda

December 13, 2014	JSM Béjaïa	5 – 4 (a.e.t)	CA Bordj Bou Arreridj	Stade de l'Unité Maghrébine, Béjaïa
14 h 00	Yahia-Chérif 17', 32', 102'; Zeghli 48', 52'	Repport	52' Attafen; 56' (pen.) Zerguine; 67' Zerrouki; 75' Hamadache	Referee: Aouina, Benaissati, Chenaoua

December 13, 2014	CA Batna	2 – 0	ES Souk Ahras	Stade 1er Novembre 1954, Batna
14 h 00	Fezzani 39', 44'	Repport		Referee: Zouaoui, Rouina, Benrouane

December 12, 2014	DRB Tadjenanet	2 – 1	HB Chelghoum Laïd	Stade Municipal de Tadjenanet, Tadjenanet
14 h 30	Omrani 54'; Boulainine 64'	Repport	88' (pen.) Oultache	Attendance: 0 Referee: Bouchama, Bezah, Benhamouda

December 13, 2014	ES Bechar Djedid	0 – 3	USM Sétif	Stade 20 Août 1955, Béchar
14 h 00		Repport	17' Touaoula; 52', 78' Bouzit	Referee: Rezgane, Hallam, Benali

December 12, 2014	NT Souf	0 – 0 (a.e.t) (4 – 2 p)	US Beni Douala	Stade 1er Novembre 1954, El Oued
14 h 30		Repport		Referee: Kheddara, Chelli, Baba

== Round of 32 ==
December 27, 2014	NRB El Achir	3 – 0	NT Souf	Stade 20 Août 1955, Bordj Bou Arréridj
14 h 00	Herizi 60'; Adjaz 75', 85'	Repport		Referee: Brahim, Rouag, Yamani

December 27, 2014	AHM Hassi Messaoud	1 – 3	RC Arbaâ	Olympic Ouargla Stadium, Ouargla
14 h 00	Tahra 32'	Repport	20' Ferhani; 47' Bouaicha; 77' Darfalou	Referee: Zouaoui, Aouina, Benrouane

December 27, 2014	NA Hussein Dey	2 – 0	USM Cheraga	Stade 20 Août 1955, Algiers
14 h 00	Madi 20'; Ouhadda 90+4'	Repport		Referee: Hallalchi, Douleche, Tazrout

December 27, 2014	ES Sétif	3 – 2	O Médéa	Stade 8 Mai 1945, Sétif
16 h 00	Benhamla 22'; Gasmi 51'; Lamri 78'	Repport	50', 69' Boulaouidet	Referee: Bouslimani, Rimouche, Belbachir

December 26, 2014	ES Guelma	0 – 1	US Chaouia	Stade Souidani Boujemaa, Guelma
14 h 30		Repport	87' Demane	Referee: Bessiri, Serradj, Bourechou

December 27, 2014	MC Oran	3 – 0	USM Oran	Stade Ahmed Zabana, Oran
16 h 00	Bezzaz 59' (pen.); Nessakh 73'; Nekkache 90+2'	Repport		Referee: Arab, Bazine, Beyoud

December 26, 2014	ESM Koléa	1 – 0 (a.e.t)	US Boukhadara	Stade Mohamed Mouaza, Koléa
14 h 30	Ladraâ 108'	Repport		Attendance: 4.000; Referee: Bousaid, Amrane, Benadda

December 26, 2014	DRB Tadjenanet	1 – 1 (a.e.t) (7 – 6 p)	CR Belouizdad	Stade Municipal de Tadjenanet, Tadjenanet
14 h 30	Boutebba 42'	Repport	90+2' Khelili	Attendance: 10.000; Referee: Saïdi, Lebchirene, Rezguene

December 27, 2014	CA Kouba	0 – 0 (a.e.t) (5 – 4 p)	MB Hessasna	Stade Omar Benhaddad, Kouba
14 h 00		Repport		Referee: Bouhou, Bourehla, saàdi

December 26, 2014	MC Saida	0 – 1 (a.e.t)	CRB Aïn Fakroun	Stade 13 Avril 1958, Saïda
14 h 30		Repport	119' Mancer	Referee: Mial, Semsoum, Idir

December 27, 2014	CA Batna	0 – 1	MO Béjaïa	Stade 1er Novembre 1954, Batna
14 h 00		Repport	57' Yaya	Referee: Abid Charef, Etchialy, Tamen

December 26, 2014	USM Alger	2 – 0	USM El Harrach	Stade Omar Hammadi, Bologhine
16 h 00	Chafaï 40'; Andria 74'; Khoualed (yellow card) 18'; Bouchema (yellow card) 82'; Koudri (yellow card) 86'	Repport	(yellow card) 31' Mazari; (yellow card) 32' Mebarki; (yellow card) 66' Kara; (yellow card) 83' Boumechra; (yellow card) 86' Harrag; (yellow card) 90+1' Ziane Cherif	Attendance: 18.000; Referee: Bekouassa, Bounoua, Rachedi

December 26, 2014	CS Constantine	1 – 0 (a.e.t)	USM Bel-Abbès	Stade Mohamed Hamlaoui, Constantine
16 h 00	Voavy 114'	Repport		Attendance: 15.000; Referee: Benbraham, Alaoua, Cheballa

January 5, 2015 Replay	CS Constantine	1 – 0	USM Bel-Abbès	Stade Mustapha Tchaker, Blida
16 h 00	Sameur 35'	Repport		Attendance: 20.000

December 27, 2014	MC El Eulma	2 – 2 (a.e.t) (1 – 4 p)	JS Kabylie	Stade Messaoud Zougar, El Eulma
16 h 00	Bouzama 10'; Hamiti 70' (pen.)	Repport	6' Khodja; 26' Aiboud	Referee: Boukhalfa, Benali, Zerhouni
	Penalties
	Derrardja (penalty scored); Hamiti (penalty missed); Maïza (penalty missed)		(penalty scored) Abdul-Raheem; (penalty scored) Mekehout; (penalty scored) Ziti (penalty scored)

December 26, 2014	JSM Bejaia	1 – 1 (a.e.t) (8 – 9 p)	ASO Chlef	Stade de l'Unité Maghrébine, Béjaïa
16 h 00	Zeghli 28'	Repport	19' Smahi	Referee: Houasnia, Badache, Boulekrinet

December 26, 2014	ASM Oran	2 – 1	USM Sétif	Stade Ahmed Zabana, Oran
16 h 00	Benchaâbane 8'Laroui 67' (o.g.)	Repport	31' Bouzit	Referee: Aouina, Benaissa, Chenaoua

== Round of 16 ==
February 20, 2015	CRB Aïn Fakroun	0 – 1 (a.e.t.)	RC Arbaâ	Stade Hassouna Zerdani, Oum El Bouaghi
15 h 00		Repport	109' Mokdad	Referee: Bichari, Guourari, Salaouandji

February 20, 2015	JS Kabylie	1 – 0	CS Constantine	Stade Omar Hammadi, Bologhine
16 h 00	Ihadjadène 9'	Repport		Attendance: 16.000; Referee: Necib, Maghlout, Benacer

February 21, 2015	NA Hussein Dey	2 – 1 (a.e.t.)	DRB Tadjenanet	Stade 20 Août 1955, Algiers
15 h 00	Guebli 13' (pen.); Ndouasel 109'	Repport	41' Benaldjia	Referee: Benbrahem, Allaoua, Yahi

February 20, 2015	ASM Oran	1 – 1 (a.e.t.) (4 – 2 p)	US Chaouia	Stade Ahmed Zabana, Oran
16 h 00	Aouad 52'	Repport	14' Moussi	Referee: Amalou, Azrine, Bourouba

February 10, 2015	ES Sétif	1 – 0	ESM Koléa	Stade 8 Mai 1945, Sétif
17 h 00	Ziaya 82'	Repport		Referee: Oukil, Serradj, Cherchar

March 10, 2015	USM Alger	1 – 1 (a.e.t.) (4 – 5 p)	ASO Chlef	Stade Omar Hammadi, Bologhine
14 h 30	Boudebouda 32'	Repport	60' Djediat

February 21, 2015	MC Oran	0 – 0 (a.e.t.) (1 – 4 p)	MO Bejaia	Stade Ahmed Zabana, Oran
14 h 00		Repport		Referee: Abid-Charef, Tamen, Boulfelfel

February 20, 2015	NRB El Achir	0 – 0 (a.e.t.) (4 – 3 p)	CA Kouba	Stade 20 Août 1955, Bordj Bou Arréridj
15 h 00		Repport		Referee: Bouchama, Bourahla, Saâdi

== Quarter-finals ==
14 March 2015	ASM Oran	2 – 2 (5 – 6 p)	MO Bejaia	Stade Ahmed Zabana, Oran
		Repport		Referee: Bekouassa, Bounoua, Rachedi

24 March 2015	NRB El Achir	0 – 3	ASO Chlef	Stade 20 Août 1955, Bordj Bou Arréridj
		Repport

13 March 2015	NA Hussein Dey	1 – 1 (a.e.t.) (1 – 3 p)	RC Arbaâ	Stade 20 Août 1955, Algiers
16 h 00	Ndouassel 81'	Repport	Zeddam 90+4'	Referee: Redouane Necib, Tamen, Meghlout
	Penalties
	Metref (penalty scored); Boukhenchouche (penalty missed); Bendebka (penalty missed)		(penalty scored) Mokdad; (penalty scored) Seddiki; (penalty missed) Darfalou; (penalty scored) El Moudene

10 March 2015	ES Sétif	2 – 1	JS Kabylie	Stade 8 Mai 1945, Sétif
17:00	Gasmi 41'; Dahar 46'	Repport	Ziti 8'	Referee: Bichari, Brahim, Salaouadji

== Semi-finals ==
10 April 2015	ES Sétif	1 – 1 (5 – 6 p)	MO Béjaïa	Stade 8 Mai 1945, Sétif
	Mellouli 1'	[ Repport]	Mebarakou 9'	Attendance: 25,000

11 April 2015	RC Arbaâ	0 – 0 (3 – 0 p)	ASO Chlef
		[ Repport]		Attendance: 15.000

== Final ==
2 May 2015
16:00

MO Béjaïa	1 – 0	RC Arbaâ
Zerdab 43'

Mustapha Tchaker Stadium, Blida
Attendance: 35,000
Referee: Mohamed Bichari

MO Béjaïa	RC Arbaâ

1	(Algeria) Smaïl Mansouri
46	(Algeria) Abdelkader Messaoudi	(yellow card) 85'
5	(Algeria) Zidane Mebarakou
31	(Algeria) Salim Benali
2	(Algeria) Amir Aguid
99	(Algeria) Nassim Dehouche (c)		(substituted off) 90'
15	(Mali) Soumaila Sidibé
32	(Algeria) Zahir Zerdab
10	(Algeria) Faouzi Yaya		(substituted off) 82'
18	(Algeria) Faouzi Rahal
9	(Algeria) Okacha Hamzaoui		(substituted off) 63'
Substitutes:
28	(Algeria) Yassine Salhi		(substituted on) 63'
70	(Mauritania) Oumar N'Diaye		(substituted on) 82'
7	(Algeria) Djamel Eddine Chatal		(substituted on) 90'
Coach:
	(Algeria) Abdelkader Amrani

31	(Algeria) Ahmed Fellah
64	(Algeria) Houari Ferhani
25	(Algeria) Hamza Zeddam (c)	(yellow card) 90+2'
5	(Algeria) Mohamed Reda Maarif		(substituted off) 63'
24	(Algeria) Nasreddine Zaâlani
18	(Algeria) Farid Daoud		(substituted off) 46'
8	(Algeria) Abdelmalek Mokdad
88	(Algeria) Elyes Seddiki	(yellow card) 75'
55	(Algeria) Nassim Yettou
13	(Algeria) Oussama Darfalou
21	(Algeria) Djamel Bouaicha		(substituted off) 54'
Substitutes:
78	(Algeria) Mehdi Kacem		(substituted on) 45'
9	(Chad) Morgan Bitorgal		(substituted on) 54'
27	(Algeria) Abdellah El Mouaden		(substituted on) 63'
Coach:
	(Algeria) Mohamed Mihoubi
