= List of Algerian football transfers winter 2016–17 =

This is a list of Algerian football transfers in the 2016–17 winter transfer window by club. clubs in the 2016–17 Algerian Ligue Professionnelle 1 are included.

== Ligue Professionnelle 1 ==
=== CA Batna ===
In:

No.	Pos.	Nation	Player

Out:

No.	Pos.	Nation	Player

=== CR Belouizdad ===
In:

No.	Pos.	Nation	Player

Out:

No.	Pos.	Nation	Player
—	FW	ALG	Kamel Zeghli (to (Algeria) MC Oran)
—	FW	ALG	Adel Bougueroua (to (Algeria) ES Sétif)
—	FW	ALG	Aboubaker Rebih (to (Algeria) CS Constantine)
—	MF	ALG	Nassim Bouchema (to (Algeria) MO Béjaïa)
—	FW	BEN	Mohamed Aoudou (to (Iraq) Al-Shorta)
—	FW	ALG	Mohamed Derrag (to (Algeria) RC Relizane)

=== CS Constantine ===
In:

No.	Pos.	Nation	Player

Out:

No.	Pos.	Nation	Player

=== DRB Tadjenanet ===
In:

No.	Pos.	Nation	Player

Out:

No.	Pos.	Nation	Player
—	DF	ALG	Arslane Mazari (to (Algeria) CS Constantine)
—	MF	ALG	Djamel Chettal (to (Algeria) USM Bel-Abbès)
—	DF	ALG	Mohamed Billel Benaldjia (to (Algeria) USM Bel-Abbès)
—	DF	ALG	Sofiane Boutebba (to (Algeria) ES Sétif)
—	FW	ALG	Farès Cheniguer (to (Algeria) JSM Skikda)

=== ES Sétif ===
In:

No.	Pos.	Nation	Player
11	FW	ALG	Adel Bougueroua (from (Algeria) CR Belouizdad)
—	DF	ALG	Sofiane Boutebba (from (Algeria) DRB Tadjenanet)
19	DF	ALG	Farid Mellouli (from (Algeria) CS Constantine)

Out:

No.	Pos.	Nation	Player
—	FW	ALG	Abdellah Daouadji (to (Algeria) NA Hussein Dey)
—	FW	ALG	Hamza Boulemdaïs (to (Algeria) MO Béjaïa)

=== JS Kabylie ===
In:

No.	Pos.	Nation	Player
—	DF	ALG	Sofiane Khelili (from (Algeria) CR Belouizdad)
—	MF	ALG	Karim Baiteche (from (Algeria) CS Constantine)
—	FW	ALG	Nasereddine El Bahari (from (Algeria) OM Arzew)
—	FW	ALG	Mehdi Benaldjia (from (Algeria) JS Saoura)
—	FW	ALG	Youcef Zerguine (from (Algeria) USM Blida)
—	FW	ALG	Thomas Izerghouf (Unattached)

Out:

No.	Pos.	Nation	Player

=== JS Saoura ===
In:

No.	Pos.	Nation	Player
15	DF	ALG	Fateh Talah (from (Algeria) CA Batna)
22	MF	ALG	Djamel Belalem (from (Algeria) ASM Oran)
27	FW	ALG	Youcef Ghazali (from (Algeria) USM Bel-Abbès)
7	MF	ALG	Abdeldjalil Taki Eddine Saâd (from (Algeria) MC Saida)

Out:

No.	Pos.	Nation	Player
—	DF	ALG	Farès Aggoune (to (Algeria) RC Relizane)
—	MF	ALG	Mehdi Benaldjia (to (Algeria) JS Kabylie)

=== MC Alger ===
In:

No.	Pos.	Nation	Player

Out:

No.	Pos.	Nation	Player

=== MC Oran ===
In:

No.	Pos.	Nation	Player
—	FW	ALG	Mohamed Noureddine Benai (to (Algeria) MC Oran)

Out:

No.	Pos.	Nation	Player
—	DF	ALG	Salim Benali (to (Algeria) MO Béjaïa)

=== MO Béjaïa ===
In:

No.	Pos.	Nation	Player

Out:

No.	Pos.	Nation	Player

=== NA Hussein Dey ===
In:

No.	Pos.	Nation	Player

Out:

No.	Pos.	Nation	Player

=== Olympique de Médéa ===
In:

No.	Pos.	Nation	Player

Out:

No.	Pos.	Nation	Player

=== RC Relizane ===
In:

No.	Pos.	Nation	Player

Out:

No.	Pos.	Nation	Player

=== USM Alger ===
In:

No.	Pos.	Nation	Player
14	MF	ALG	Faouzi Bourenane (from (Czech Republic) Příbram)
17	FW	ALG	Mohamed Benkablia (from (Algeria) JS Kabylie)

Out:

No.	Pos.	Nation	Player

=== USM Bel-Abbès ===
In:

No.	Pos.	Nation	Player

Out:

No.	Pos.	Nation	Player

=== USM El Harrach ===
In:

No.	Pos.	Nation	Player

Out:

No.	Pos.	Nation	Player
