= Football at the 2015 Military World Games – Men's tournament =

2015 Men's Military Football Tournament
Tournament details
- Host country: South Korea
- City: Mungyeong
- Dates: 30 September – 10 October
- Teams: 10 (from 6 confederations)
- Venues: 5 (in 4 host cities)

Final positions
- Champions: Algeria (2nd title)
- Runners-up: Oman
- Third place: South Korea
- Fourth place: Egypt

Tournament statistics
- Matches played: 25
- Goals scored: 95 (3.8 per match)

The men's football tournament at the 2015 Military World Games was held in Mungyeong in South Korea from 30 September to 10 October.

== Group stage ==
Key to colours in pool tables
Qualified for the final
Qualified for the third place match

=== Group A ===
Team	Pld	W	D	L	GF	GA	GD	Pts
Algeria	4	4	0	0	11	3	+8	12
South Korea	4	3	0	1	11	3	+8	9
Qatar	4	2	0	2	7	7	0	6
France	4	0	1	3	1	4	−3	1
United States	4	0	1	3	2	18	−16	1

Source: CISM
30 September 2015
11:00

South Korea	7–0	United States
Jo Dong-kun 3', 50'; Lee Seung-gi 19', 65'; Kim Sung-hwan 40'; Kim Oh-kyu 42'; Park Gi-dong 82'	Report

Mungyeong Civic Stadium, Mungyeong
Referee: Nicolas Rainville (France)
30 September 2015
15:00

Algeria	2–1	Qatar
Youcef 78'; Abid 88'	Report	Diallo 13'

Mungyeong Civic Stadium, Mungyeong
Referee: Christian Palavicino (Canada)

2 October 2015
11:00

Qatar	1–0	France
Ali 48'	Report

Andong Citizen Ground, Andong
Referee: Marcelo de Lima Henrique (Brazil)
2 October 2015
15:00

United States	0–5	Algeria
	Report	Youcef 17', 62'; Belhadi 44'; Yaya 80'; Hamzaoui 90+2'

Andong Citizen Ground, Andong
Referee: Mahmoud Ashour (Egypt)

4 October 2015
11:00

France	0–1	South Korea
	Report	Jo Dong-kun 37'

Andong Citizen Ground, Andong
Referee: Patrick Schult (Germany)
4 October 2015
15:00

Qatar	5–1	United States
Ebanda 3'; Odoi 40', 68'; Ali 63', 65'	Report	Baker 45'

Andong Citizen Ground, Andong
Referee: Leandro de Lima e Silva (Brazil)

6 October 2015
11:00

France	0–1	Algeria
	Report	Abid 64'

Yeongju Civic Stadium, Yeongju
Referee: Mark Geiger (United States)
6 October 2015
15:00

South Korea	1–0	Qatar
Lee Chang-hoon 89'	Report

Yeongju Civic Stadium, Yeongju
Referee: Marcelo de Lima Henrique (Brazil)

8 October 2015
11:00

United States	1–1	France
Krueger 12'	Report	Magnier 3'

Sangju Civic Stadium, Sangju
Referee: Mokhtar Amalou (Algeria)
8 October 2015
15:00

Algeria	3–2	South Korea
Abid 10'; Benkablia 42'; Hamzaoui 89'	Report	Lee Yong 54'; Park Jin-po 74' (pen.)

Sangju Civic Stadium, Sangju
Referee: Patrick Schult (Germany)

=== Group B ===
Team	Pld	W	D	L	GF	GA	GD	Pts
Oman	4	3	0	1	18	3	+15	9
Egypt	4	3	0	1	14	4	+10	9
Brazil	4	3	0	1	6	3	+3	9
Guinea	4	1	0	3	4	14	−10	3
Canada	4	0	0	4	1	19	−18	0

Source: CISM
30 September 2015
11:00

Canada	0–3	Brazil
	Report	Santos de Almeida 30', 48'; Costa da Silva 53'

Andong Citizen Ground, Andong
Referee: Khamis Al-Kuwari (Qatar)
30 September 2015
15:30

Oman	6–1	Guinea
Al-Muqbali 19', 49', 59', 62'; Al-Abdul Salam 25'; Al Abd Al Nofli 45+1'	Report	Fernandez 55'

Andong Citizen Ground, Andong
Referee: Mark Geiger (United States)

2 October 2015
11:00

Guinea	1–6	Egypt
Sylla 33'	Report	Aly 6'; Temsah 12'; Salama 16', 28', 52'; Mohamed 90'

Mungyeong Civic Stadium, Mungyeong
Referee: Badr Nlamkaddem (Netherlands)
2 October 2015
15:00

Brazil	0–2	Oman
	Report	Al-Abdul Salam 58'; Al-Dhabouni 90+3'

Mungyeong Civic Stadium, Mungyeong
Referee: Mokhtar Amalou (Algeria)

4 October 2015
11:00

Egypt	5–0	Canada
Aly 21', 75'; El-Sayed 23'; Salah 84', 90+1'	Report

Mungyeong Civic Stadium, Mungyeong
Referee: Nicolas Rainville (France)
2 October 2015
15:00

Guinea	0–1	Brazil
	Report	Fidelis de Paula 72'

Mungyeong Civic Stadium, Mungyeong
Referee: Christian Palavicino (Canada)

6 October 2015
11:00

Egypt	2–1	Oman
Salam 41'; Al-Yahmadi 62' (o.g.)	Report	Al-Muqbali 52'

Sangju Civic Stadium, Sangju
Referee: Badr Nlamkaddem (Netherlands)
6 October 2015
15:00

Canada	1–2	Guinea
Chambers 36'	Report	Fernandez 16'; Camara 46'

Sangju Civic Stadium, Sangju
Referee: Mohammed Al-Hakim (Sweden)

8 October 2015
11:00

Brazil	2–1	Egypt
Rosendo Patriota 38', 57'	Report	Shadid 2'

Yeongju Civic Stadium, Yeongju
Referee: Mohammed Al-Hakim (Sweden)
8 October 2015
15:00

Oman	9–0	Canada
Al-Mukhaini 8', 17'; Khamis 35'; Al-Ajmi 43', 64'; Al-Rawahi 47'; Al-Dhabouni 53'; Yaruk 55' (o.g.); Al-Muqbali 78'	Report

Yeongju Civic Stadium, Yeongju
Referee: Mahmoud Ashour (Egypt)

== Knockout stage ==
=== Classification 7–8 ===
10 October 2015
11:00

Guinea	1–2	France
Camara 67'	Report	Oggad 19'; Dumontant 36'

Yeongju Civic Stadium, Yeongju
Referee: Khamis Al-Kuwari Qatar

=== Third place match ===
10 October 2015
11:00

South Korea	3–2	Egypt
Kim Do-yup 64', 88'; Lee Chang-hoon 72'	Report	Mohamed 33'; Temsah 37'

Sangju Civic Stadium, Sangju
Referee: Leandro de Lima e Silva Brazil

=== Classification 9–10 ===
10 October 2015
15:00

Canada	2–3 (a.e.t.)	United States
Copoc 9'; Brown 34' (o.g.)	Report	Brown 45', 111'; Schinelli 83'

Yeongju Civic Stadium, Yeongju
Referee: Ousmane Jacob Camara Guinea

=== Classification 5–6 ===
10 October 2015
15:00

Qatar	3–2	Brazil
Abdallah 35'; Odoi 43'; Ali 90+1'	Report	Gusma do Nascimento 42', 84'

Sangju Civic Stadium, Sangju
Referee: Nicolas Rainville France

=== Final ===
10 October 2015
15:00

Algeria	2–0 (a.e.t.)	Oman
Darfalou 105+1', 112'	Report

KAFAC Sports Complex, Mungyeong
Referee: Mark Geiger United States

== Final ranking ==
Pos	Team	Pld	W	D	L	GF	GA	GD	Pts
1	Algeria	5	5	0	0	13	3	+10	15
2	Oman	5	3	0	2	18	5	+13	9
3	South Korea	5	4	0	1	14	5	+9	12
4	Egypt	5	3	0	2	16	7	+9	9
5	Brazil	4	3	0	1	6	3	+3	9
6	Qatar	4	2	0	2	7	7	0	6
7	Guinea	4	1	0	3	4	14	−10	3
8	France	4	0	1	3	1	4	−3	1
9	United States	4	0	1	3	2	18	−16	1
10	Canada	4	0	0	4	1	19	−18	0

Source: CISM

== Best scorers ==
5 goals

- (Oman) Abdulaziz Al-Muqbali

4 goals

- (Egypt) Hossam Salama
- (Qatar) Omar Ali

3 goals

- (Algeria) Lamine Abid
- (Algeria) Maâmar Youcef
- (Egypt) Alaa-Eddine Aly
- (South Korea) Jo Dong-kun
- (Qatar) Justice Odoi

2 goals

- (Algeria) Oussama Darfalou
- (Algeria) Okacha Hamzaoui
- (Brazil) Claude Gusma do Nascimento
- (Brazil) Endson Rosendo Patriota
- (Brazil) Richardson Santos de Almeida
- (Egypt) Maged Mohamed
- (Egypt) Ibrahim Salah
- (Egypt) Ahmed Temsah
- (Guinea) Jean-Charles Fernandez
- (South Korea) Kim Do-yup
- (South Korea) Lee Seung-gi
- (South Korea) Lee Chang-hoon
- (South Korea) Park Jin-po
- (Oman) Said Al-Abdul Salam
- (Oman) Ismail Al-Ajmi
- (Oman) Said Al-Dhabouni
- (Oman) Ahmed Al-Mukhaini
- (United States) Trent Brown

1 goal

- (Algeria) Mohamed Belhadi
- (Algeria) Mohamed Benkablia
- (Algeria) Faouzi Yaya
- (Brazil) Heider de Paula dos Santos
- (Brazil) Ronaldo Costa da Silva
- (Canada) Liam Michael Chambers
- (Canada) Jeffrey Copoc
- (Egypt) Arafa El-Sayed
- (Egypt) Ahmed Shadid
- (France) Kevin Dumontant
- (France) Romain Magnier
- (France) Yann Oggad
- (Guinea) Ibrahima Kassory Camara
- (Guinea) Sékou Camara
- (Guinea) Aly Sylla
- (South Korea) Kim Oh-kyu
- (South Korea) Kim Sung-hwan
- (South Korea) Yong Lee
- (South Korea) Park Jin-po
- (South Korea) Park Gi-dong
- (Oman) Al Abd Al Nofli
- (Oman) Basel Al-Rawahi
- (Oman) Khamis Daiq
- (Qatar) Saud Abdallah
- (Qatar) Mamadou Diallo
- (Qatar) Etienne Ebanda
- (United States) Kyle Portiea Baker
- (United States) Christopher Krueger
- (United States) Ian Schinelli

Own goal

- (Canada) Ivan Yaruk (playing against Oman)
- (Oman) Asaad Al-Yahmadi (playing against Egypt)
