= Ahmed Fellah =

Algerian football player (born 1982)

Personal information
- Full name: Ahmed Fellah
- Date of birth: November 14, 1982 (age 43)
- Place of birth: Si Abdelghani, Algeria
- Position: Goalkeeper

Team information
- Current team: ASM Oran
- Number: 30

Senior career*
Years	Team	Apps	(Gls)
2005–2007	NARB Réghaïa	–	(–)
2007–2010	CR Belouizdad	12	(1)
2010–2012	MC Oran	38	(0)
2012–2013	CA Bordj Bou Arréridj	14	(0)
2013–2015	RC Arbaâ	39	(0)
2015–	ASM Oran	6	(0)
- * Club domestic league appearances and goals as of 22:00, 25 October 2012 (UTC)

Ahmed Fellah (born November 14, 1982) is an Algerian football player who plays for ASM Oran in the Algerian Ligue Professionnelle 1. Fellah has spent his entire career in Algeria, he has had spells at NARB Réghaïa, CR Belouizdad, MC Oran, CA Bordj Bou Arréridj, RC Arbaâ and currently with ASM Oran. He won the 2008–09 Algerian Cup with Belouizdad. He scored his first professional goal in 2009 when he scored the winner against AS Khroub.

== Club career ==
=== Early career ===
Fellah started his career in Reghaïa with NARB Réghaïa in Algerian Ligue Professionnelle 2, he stayed in Reghaïa until 2007 when he completed a move to top-flight Algerian Ligue Professionnelle 1 club CR Belouizdad. Fellah had three years with Belouizdad where he won the Algerian Cup in 2008–09 and scored a goal. His only career goal to date came on 14 May 2015 when he scored a penalty to win the match for Belouizdad. He left the club in 2010.

=== MC Oran ===
After leaving Belouizdad, Fellah joined MC Oran. He made his league debut against USM Blida on 25 September 2010 in a 0–0 away draw. He received his first career red card on 3 December when he was sent off in Oran's 0–0 draw with ES Sétif. In total, he made seventeen appearances in his debut season for Oran. In the following season, Fellah started twenty-one of the club's thirty Ligue 1 fixtures. Exactly one year after Fellah was red carded against Sétif on 3 December 2010, he was again given his marching orders on 3 December 2011 when referee Rafik Achouri gave him his second yellow card in the 84th minute but Oran managed to hold on for a 1–0 win against JSM Béjaïa. His final appearance for Oran was a 1–5 home defeat to CA Batna. He left at the end of the season.

=== CA Bordj Bou Arréridj ===
Fellah joined the third club of his career for the 2012–13 Algerian Ligue Professionnelle 1 season when he signed for newly promoted CA Bordj Bou Arréridj. He made his debut for Bordj Bou Arréridj against the team that his last MC Oran appearance came against – CA Batna. He had a better afternoon against Batna this time as he and his team drew 1–1 with the Batna based club. Overall, Fellah played just under half of Bordj Bou Arréridj's Ligue 1 matches and he subsequently left at the end of that campaign.

=== RC Arbaâ ===
Next came a move to RC Arbaâ, another newly promoted team. His first Arbaâ appearance came against his former club Belouizdad, the match against Belouizdad was the start of sixteen matches in his first year (2013–14) at Arbaâ. In 2014–15, Fellah played the most matches in a season in his career as he started twenty-three of the thirty league fixtures for Arbaâ. He completed the 90 minutes in all but one match for the club, he left the match on 20 September 2014 against USM Alger early due to him picking up his third career red card in the 95th minute. He played the full match in the 2014–15 Algerian Cup final, a game that Arbaâ lost 1–0 at the Stade Mustapha Tchaker to MO Béjaïa.

=== ASM Oran ===
On 1 July 2015, Fellah joined ASM Oran. He made his debut on 15 August versus USM Blida.

== Career statistics ==
As of match played 16 October 2015.

Appearances and goals by club, season and competition
Club	Season	League			National Cup		Continental		Total	
Club	Season	Division	Apps	Goals	Apps	Goals	Apps	Goals	Apps	Goals
CR Belouizdad	2007–08	Ligue 1	–	–	–	–	—		–	–
CR Belouizdad	2008–09	Ligue 1	–	1	–	–	—		–	1
CR Belouizdad	2009–10	Ligue 1	12	0	–	–	–	–	12	0
Total			12	1	–	–	–	–	12	1
MC Oran	2010–11	Ligue 1	17	0	–	–	—		17	0
MC Oran	2011–12	Ligue 1	21	0	–	–	—		21	0
Total			38	0	–	–	—		38	0
CA Bordj Bou Arréridj	2012–13	Ligue 1	14	0	–	–	—		14	0
Total			14	0	–	–	—		14	0
RC Arbaâ	2013–14	Ligue 1	16	0	–	–	—		16	0
RC Arbaâ	2014–15	Ligue 1	23	0	4	0	—		27	0
Total			39	0	4	0	—		43	0
ASM Oran	2015–16	Ligue 1	6	0	0	0	—		6	0
Total			6	0	0	0	0	0	6	0
Career total			109	1	4	0	0	0	113	1

== Honours ==
Fellah won the 2008–09 Algerian Cup, which is the sole honour in his career so far.

CR Belouizdad

- Algerian Cup: 2008–09
