= Jugurtha Domrane =

French footballer (born 1989)

Personal information
- Date of birth: 13 July 1989 (age 36)
- Place of birth: France
- Position: Defender

Senior career*
Years	Team	Apps	(Gls)
2009	Le Mans FC	0	(0)
2009–2011	Pacy Ménilles RC	46	(0)
2011–2012	Lille OSC	0	(0)
2012–2013	Royal Excel Mouscron	17	(2)
2013–2014	R.W.S. Bruxelles	12	(0)
2014/2015	USM Bel-Abbès	12	(0)
2014/2015	MO Béjaïa	6	(0)
2015/2016	R.W.S. Bruxelles	4	(0)
2018/2019	AS Saint-Ouen-l'Aumône		
2019/2020	Saint-Brice FC		
- * Club domestic league appearances and goals

Jugurtha Domrane (Arabic: يوغرطة دومران; born 13 July 1989) is a French retired footballer.

== Career ==
After failing to make an appearance for French Ligue 1 clubs Le Mans and Lille OSC, Domrane signed for Royal Excel Mouscron in the Belgian second division, due to Lille OSC owning the team. Later, he regretted leaving Lille OSC, saying that he "should have waited for my chance".

For the second half of 2014/15, Domrane signed for MO Béjaïa, helping them win that season's Algerian Cup.

In 2015, he returned to Belgium with R.W.S. Bruxelles amid offers from Tunisia and France.

During 2018/19, at the age of 29, he played for French sixth division side AS Saint-Ouen-l'Aumône before leaving for Saint-Brice in the same league because of financial disagreements.
