= Zidane Mebarakou =

Algerian footballer (born 1989)

Zidane Mebarakou ⵣⵉⴷⴰⵏ ⵎⴻⴱⴰⵔⴰⴽⵓ
Personal information
- Full name: Zidane Mebarakou
- Date of birth: 3 January 1989 (age 37)
- Place of birth: Barbacha, Algeria
- Height: 1.88 m (6 ft 2 in)
- Position: Centre-back

Team information
- Current team: MO Béjaïa
- Number: 5

Youth career
- –2009: JSM Béjaïa

Senior career*
| Years | Team | Apps | (Gls) |
| 2009–2014 | JSM Béjaïa | 82 | (0) |
| 2014–2016 | MO Béjaïa | 40 | (0) |
| 2016–2019 | MC Alger | 54 | (1) |
| 2019 | Al-Wehda | 11 | (1) |
| 2019–2020 | MC Alger | 16 | (0) |
| 2020–2022 | CS Constantine | 62 | (2) |
| 2023–2025 | Olympique Akbou | 45 | (8) |
| 2025– | MO Béjaïa | 9 | (0) |
- * Club domestic league appearances and goals as of 12 November 2025

Zidane Mebarakou (Arabic: زيدان مباراكو; Tamazight: ⵣⵉⴷⴰⵏ ⵎⴻⴱⴰⵔⴰⴽⵓ; born 3 January 1989) is an Algerian professional footballer who plays as a centre-back for MO Béjaïa.

== Personal life ==
Mebarakou is from Barbacha, 40 km south of the city of Béjaïa in Kabylia.

== Career ==
He made his professional debut with local club JSM Béjaïa. He moved to MO Béjaïa in summer 2014. At his new club, he won the Algerian Cup, scoring in the semi-final against ES Sétif. At the end of his first year at the club, he was voted player of the season in an online survey.

In 2016, he joined MC Alger alongside teammate Zahir Zerdab on a two-year deal. After 2 years and a half in the Algerian capital, he joined Saudi Pro League side Al-Wehda in January 2019. He returned to MC Alger during the following transfer window after Saudi club owners did not wish to keep him.

In 2020, he joined CS Constantine, where he would play for two years.

Having spent 6 months without a club, Mebarakou signed with third-tier promotion contender Olympique Akbou in January 2023. On April 28, 2023, he scored the 2nd goal in a 3–0 win against USM Khenchela in the Algerian Cup round of 16, earning them a historic qualification to the quarterfinals.

== International career ==
His performances at MO Béjaïa attracted the eyes of coach Christian Gourcuff. Nonetheless, he never played for the national team.

== Honours ==
MO Béjaïa

- Algerian Cup: 2014–15
- Algerian Super Cup runner-up: 2015

MC Alger

- Algerian Super Cup runner-up: 2016

Olympique Akbou

- Algerian Ligue 2: 2023–24 (Center-East Group)
- Algerian Ligue 3: 2022–23 (Center-East Group)
