= Soumaila Sidibe =

Malian footballer

Personal information
- Full name: Soumaila Sidibe
- Date of birth: 15 June 1992 (age 34)
- Place of birth: Bamako, Mali
- Height: 1.78 m (5 ft 10 in)
- Position: Defensive midfielder

Team information
- Current team: RS Berkane
- Number: 5

Youth career
- CO Bamako

Senior career*
Years	Team	Apps	(Gls)
- CO Bamako
2014–2017	MO Béjaïa	84	(1)
2017–2018	USM Alger	5	(0)
2018	CR Belouizdad	22	(0)
2019–2021	AS Police		

International career^{‡}
2011	Mali U20	3	(0)
2014–	Mali	1	(0)
- * Club domestic league appearances and goals as of 01:30, 8 March 2020 (UTC) ‡ National team caps and goals as of 00:00, 29 June 2017 (EST)

Soumaila Sidibe (born 15 June 1992 in Bamako) is a Malian footballer who plays for AS Police. He plays primarily as a defensive midfielder.

== Club career ==
In January 2015, Sidibe signed a three-and-a-half-year contract with Algerian Ligue Professionnelle 1 club MO Béjaïa, becoming the first ever foreign player in the history of the club.

== International career ==
Sidibe was a member of the Mali national under-20 football team at the 2011 FIFA U-20 World Cup in Colombia, where he started all three all of Mali's matches.

== Honours ==
MO Béjaïa

- Algerian Cup: 2015
