= Maâmar Youcef =

Algerian footballer (born 1989)

Personal information
- Full name: Maâmar Youcef
- Date of birth: October 3, 1989 (age 37)
- Position: Defender

Team information
- Current team: JSM Béjaïa
- Number: 19

Senior career*
| Years | Team | Apps | (Gls) |
| 2009–2013 | ASO Chlef | 22 | (0) |
| 2014 | MC Saida | ? | (?) |
| 2015 | RC Relizane | ? | (?) |
| 2015 | MO Béjaïa | ? | (?) |
| 2016 | CR Belouizdad | ? | (?) |
| 2016–2017 | ASO Chlef | ? | (?) |
| 2017–2018 | MO Béjaïa | ? | (?) |
| 2018 | WA Tlemcen | ? | (?) |
| 2019– | JSM Béjaïa | ? | (?) |

International career^{‡}
| 2011 | Algeria Military | ? | (?) |
Medal record
Representing Algeria
Men's Football
| Gold medal – first place | Rio 2011 | Team competition |
- * Club domestic league appearances and goals as of 2019 ‡ National team caps and goals as of 00:00, April 24, 2012 (UTC)

Maâmar Youcef (born October 3, 1989) is an Algerian football player who plays for JSM Béjaïa in the Algerian Ligue Professionnelle 2.

== Club career ==
On August 6, 2009, Youcef made his professional debut for ASO Chlef as a starter in a league game against USM El Harrach.

== International career ==
In July 2011, Youcef was a member of the Algeria National Military Team that won the World Military Cup in Rio de Janeiro. He started in the final against Egypt, which Algeria won 1–0.

== Honours ==
=== Club ===
- ASO Chlef
  - Algerian Ligue Professionnelle 1
    - Winner: 2010–11

=== Country ===
- Algeria
  - World Military Cup
    - Winner: 2011
