= Nassim Dehouche =

Algerian footballer (born 1982)

Personal information
- Date of birth: August 12, 1982 (age 44)
- Place of birth: Béjaïa, Algeria
- Height: 1.76 m (5 ft 9 in)
- Position: Midfielder

Team information
- Current team: MC El Eulma

Senior career*
Years	Team	Apps	(Gls)
1999–2007	JSM Bejaïa	64	(1)
2007–2010	JS Kabylie	50	(0)
2010	JSM Bejaïa	8	(0)
2010–2011	CA Bordj Bou Arreridj	13	(1)
2011–2012	MO Béjaïa	-	(-)
2012–2013	MC El Eulma	12	(0)
2013–2015	MO Béjaïa	66	(3)
2015–	MC El Eulma	0	(0)

International career^{‡}
2008	Algeria A'	1	(1)
- * Club domestic league appearances and goals as of 00:00, July 7, 2015 (EST) ‡ National team caps and goals as of 00:00, July 7, 2015 (EST)

Nassim Dehouche (born August 12, 1982) is an Algerian footballer who plays as a midfielder for MC El Eulma in the Algerian Ligue Professionnelle 2.

== Honours ==
- Won the Algerian League once with JS Kabylie in 2008
