= Oumar N'Diaye (footballer, born 1988) =

Mauritanian footballer

Personal information
- Full name: Oumar Ibrahima N'Diaye
- Date of birth: December 9, 1988 (age 37)
- Place of birth: Nouakchott, Mauritania
- Height: 1.83 m (6 ft 0 in)
- Position: Midfielder

Team information
- Current team: Blagnac

Youth career
- 2007–2009: Toulouse

Senior career*
Years	Team	Apps	(Gls)
2009–2010	Toulouse	0	(0)
2011–2012	Metz	2	(0)
2013–2014	Luzenac	17	(0)
2014–2015	Limoges FC	6	(0)
2015–2016	MO Béjaïa	11	(1)
2016–	Blagnac		

International career^{‡}
2013–	Mauritania	3	(0)
- * Club domestic league appearances and goals as of 1 July 2016 ‡ National team caps and goals as of 00:00, May 2, 2015 (EST)

Oumar N'Diaye (born December 9, 1988) is a Mauritanian professional footballer who for Blagnac FC.
