= Okacha Hamzaoui =

Algerian footballer (born 1990)

Personal information
- Date of birth: 29 November 1990 (age 35)
- Place of birth: Aïn Kermes, Algeria
- Height: 1.85 m (6 ft 1 in)
- Position: Forward

Youth career
- WAB Aïn Kermès

Senior career*
Years	Team	Apps	(Gls)
2008–2009	WAB Aïn Kermès		
2009–2010	IRB Sougueur		
2010–2013	USM Bel-Abbès	65	(16)
2013–2014	JS Saoura	37	(7)
2014–2016	MO Béjaïa	39	(10)
2016–2019	Nacional	41	(7)
2017–2018	→ USM Alger (loan)	9	(1)
2019	USM Bel Abbès	2	(0)
2020–2021	Tractor	17	(1)
2021–2022	CS Constantine	22	(3)
2022–2024	Fujairah	38	(22)
2024	Al-Batin	15	(10)
2024–2025	Al-Hazem	27	(9)
2025–2026	Dibba Al-Hisn		

International career
2015	Algerian Military		
2017–2019	Algeria A'	2	(0)
Medal record
Representing Algeria
Men's Football
Military World Games
Gold medal – first place	2015 South Korea	Algeria military national team
- * Club domestic league appearances and goals as of 11 June 2022

Okacha Hamzaoui (born 29 November 1990) is an Algerian professional footballer who plays as a forward.

== Club career ==
On 17 June 2016, Hamzaoui signed a two-year contract with C.D. Nacional. In 2019, Hamzaoui signed a contract with USM Bel Abbès. In 2021, he joined CS Constantine. In 2022, he joined Fujairah FC. On 2 February 2024, Hamzaoui joined Saudi club Al-Batin.

On 2 July 2025, Hamzaoui joined UAE club Dibba Al-Hisn.

== International career ==
In June 2011, Hamzaoui was called up for the first time to the Algeria national under-23 football team by Azzedine Aït Djoudi for a two-week training camp in preparation for the 2011 CAF U-23 Championship. However, he did not make the final squad.

In 2015, Hamzaoui was a member of the Algeria military national football team that won the gold medal at the 2015 Military World Games.

== Career statistics ==
=== Club ===
As of 27 January 2017

Club	Season	League			Cup (Note: Includes Algerian Cup and Taça de Portugal)		League Cup (Note: Includes Taça da Liga)		Other		Continental (Note: Includes CAF Champions League and CAF Confederation Cup)		Total	
Club	Season	Division	Apps	Goals	Apps	Goals	Apps	Goals	Apps	Goals	Apps	Goals	Apps	Goals
Club		League			Cup		League Cup		Other		Africa		Total	
USM Bel-Abbès	2012–13	Ligue 1	13	0	0	0	—		—		—		0	0
USM Bel-Abbès	Total		13	0	0	0	—		—		—		0	0
JS Saoura	2012–13	Ligue 1	13	3	0	0	—		—		—		13	3
JS Saoura	2013–14	Ligue 1	24	4	0	0	—		—		—		24	4
JS Saoura	Total		37	7	0	0	—		—		—		37	7
MO Béjaïa	2014–15	Ligue 1	22	7	5	2	—		—		—		22	7
MO Béjaïa	2015–16	Ligue 1	16	3	3	0	—		—		—		20	4
MO Béjaïa	Total		38	10	8	2	—		—		—		46	12
Club		League			Cup		League Cup		Other		Europe		Total	
Nacional	2016–17	Primeira Liga	12	4	1	0	1	0	—		—		14	4
Nacional	Total		12	4	1	0	1	0	—		—		14	4
Career total			100	21	9	2	1	0	0	0	0	0	110	23

== Honours ==
Tractor

- Hazfi Cup: 2019–20

Algeria

- Military World Games gold medal: 2015
