= Mohamed Mihoubi =

Algerian football manager

Managerial career
- Years: Team
- 2014: CA Bordj Bou Arréridj
- 2014–2015: RC Arbaâ
- 2015–2016: MSP Batna

Mohamed Mihoubi is an Algerian football manager.
