= Maghrebi Unity Stadium =

Building in Algeria

Coordinates: 36°44′58″N 5°02′48″E

Maghrebi Unity Stadium ⵎⴰⴳⵀⵔⴻⴱⵉ ⵓⵏⵉⵜⵢ ⵙⵜⴰⴷⵉⵓⵎ
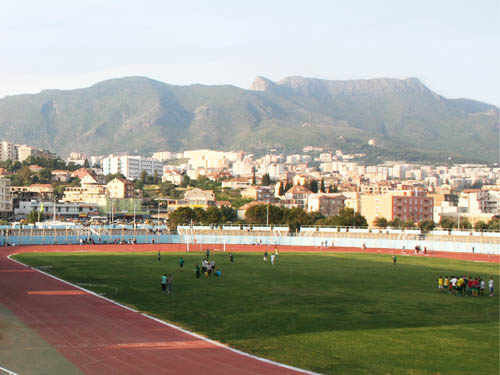
- Interactive map of Maghrebi Unity Stadium ⵎⴰⴳⵀⵔⴻⴱⵉ ⵓⵏⵉⵜⵢ ⵙⵜⴰⴷⵉⵓⵎ
- Full name: Maghrebi Unity Stadium
- Location: Béjaïa, Algeria
- Owner: APC of Béjaïa
- Capacity: 17,500
- Surface: Artificial turf

Construction
- Opened: 1987
- Renovated: 2009

Tenants
- JSM Béjaïa; MO Béjaïa

Maghrebi Unity Stadium (Arabic: ملعب الإتحــاد المغــاربـي, Tamazight: ⵎⴰⴳⵀⵔⴻⴱⵉ ⵓⵏⵉⵜⵢ ⵙⵜⴰⴷⵉⵓⵎ) is a multi-use stadium in Béjaïa, Kabylia, Algeria. It is currently used mostly for football matches and is the home ground of JSM Béjaïa and MO Béjaïa. The stadium holds 17,500 people.

== Algeria national football team matches ==
The Maghrebi Unity Stadium has hosted one game of the Algeria national football team, against Morocco in 1989.

22 March 1989
00:00 UTC+1

Algeria	1–1	Morocco
Benabou 44'	Report	Haidamou 24'

Maghrebi Unity Stadium, Béjaïa
Attendance: 15,000
Referee: Rachid Medjiba (Algeria)
