= Amir Aguid =

Algerian footballer (born 1992)

Personal information
- Date of birth: 26 September 1992 (age 34)
- Position: Right back

Team information
- Current team: CR Témouchent

Senior career*
Years	Team	Apps	(Gls)
2012–2013	WA Tlemcen	5	(0)
2014–2016	MO Béjaïa	35	(0)
2016–2017	MC Oran	10	(0)
2017–2018	JSM Skikda	21	(0)
2018–2019	ASM Oran	11	(0)
2019	ES Mostaganem	9	(1)
2019–2020	WA Tlemcen		
2020–2021	JSM Tiaret		
2021–2022	USM Khenchela		
2022–	CR Témouchent	0	(0)
- * Club domestic league appearances and goals as of 25 August 2022

Amir Aguid (born 26 September 1992) is an Algerian footballer who plays for CR Témouchent as a defender.
