= Zahir Zerdab =

Algerian footballer (born 1982)

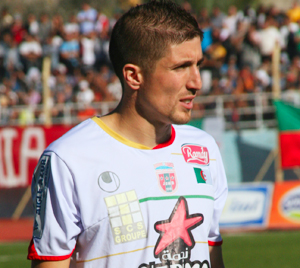
- Zahir Zerdab in 2016.

Personal information
- Date of birth: 9 January 1982 (age 44)
- Place of birth: Amiens, France
- Height: 1.80 m (5 ft 11 in)
- Position: Midfielder

Team information
- Current team: US Camon

Senior career*
Years	Team	Apps	(Gls)
2003–2004	US Camon		
2004–2006	Roye	35	(2)
2006–2007	Beauvais	10	(1)
2007–2008	Reims	7	(0)
2008–2009	Zulte Waregem	1	(0)
2009–2011	JSM Béjaïa	74	(15)
2011–2013	Rouen	48	(9)
2013–2014	CS Constantine	22	(2)
2014–2016	MO Béjaïa	56	(15)
2016–2017	MC Alger	18	(4)
2018–2022	US Camon		
2022–2023	AC Amiens	23	(8)
2023–	US Camon		

International career
2010	Algeria A'	3	(0)
2010	Algeria	1	(0)
- * Club domestic league appearances and goals as of 16:29, 22 December 2023 (UTC)

Zahir Zerdab (Arabic: زهير زرداب; born 9 January 1982) is a former professional footballer who now plays as an amateur midfielder for US Camon. Born in France, he played for Algeria national team.

== Club career ==
Zerdab started his career with ASM Rivery, moving to US Camon at the age of nine, where he would spend the next ten years. He gradually progressed from the regional leagues to the professional level, moving to US Roye-Noyon and AS Beauvais Oise before signing a professional contract with Stade de Reims in Ligue 2 and then for S.V. Zulte Waregem in the Belgian Pro League. In 2009 he had an offer from Algeria and joined JSM Béjaïa.

On 16 June 2011, Zerdab announced that he would be leaving JSM Béjaïa and joining Championnat National side FC Rouen at the end of the 2010–11 Algerian Ligue Professionnelle 1 season. With Rouen promoted on the field in toe Ligue 2, but demoted administratively, Zerdab returned to Algeria with first CS Constantine and then MO Béjaïa, where he was runner up in the 2014–15 Algerian Ligue Professionnelle 1 and scored the only goal in the 2015 Algerian Cup final. Success with MO Béjaïa secured a move to MC Alger for the 2016–17 season.

After finishing his professional career in Algeria, Zerdab moved back to France where he re-joined US Camon for four seasons in the regional divisions, before spending a season in Championnat National 3 with AC Amiens. He returned to US Camon in the summer of 2023 at the age of 41, scoring the only goal as the club beat Championnat National 2 opposition in the fifth round of the 2023–24 Coupe de France.

== International career ==
On 8 October 2010, Zerdab made his debut for the Algerian A' National Team in a friendly against Mali. He started the game and was subbed off by Moustapha Djallit.
