= Faouzi Yaya =

Algerian footballer (born 1989)

Personal information
- Full name: Faouzi Yaya
- Date of birth: September 21, 1989 (age 37)
- Place of birth: Timezrit, Algeria
- Height: 1.74 m (5 ft 9 in)
- Position: Midfielder

Team information
- Current team: MO Béjaïa
- Number: 10

Senior career*
Years	Team	Apps	(Gls)
2009–2010	ES Timezrit	20	(6)
2010–2012	MO Béjaïa	26	(11)
2012–2013	ES Sétif	38	(10)
2013	→ NA Hussein Dey	12	(3)
2013–2017	MO Béjaïa	90	(5)
2017–2018	USM Alger	29	(6)
2019–2023	NA Hussein Dey		
2023–	MO Béjaïa		

International career
- Algeria
- * Club domestic league appearances and goals as of 20:00, January 14, 2023 (EST)

Faouzi Yaya (Arabic: فوزي يايا; born September 21, 1989) is an Algerian footballer who plays for MO Béjaïa.

== Club career ==
Yaya starred for Algerian side MO Béjaïa in two spells (from 2010 to 2012 and again from 2013 to 2017), helping the club reach the final of the 2016 CAF Confederation Cup. In 2012, he joined rivals ES Sétif, where he would play for manager Hubert Velud. Yaya captained MO Béjaïa during his second spell at the club, a key member of the team that narrowly missed out on the 2014–15 Algerian Ligue Professionnelle 1 title. In the 2016 CAF Confederation Cup final, MO Béjaïa faced TP Mazembe, then managed by Velud. Yaya scored MO Béjaïa's only goal in the first leg, while TP Mazembe secured a 4–1 victory in the second leg to win the tie. In 2017, he decided to join USMA.
