= Djamel Chettal =

Algerian footballer (born 1992)

Personal information
- Full name: Djamel Eddine Chettal
- Date of birth: May 23, 1992 (age 34)
- Place of birth: Algiers, Algeria
- Height: 1.70 m (5 ft 7 in)
- Position: Winger

Senior career*
Years	Team	Apps	(Gls)
2012–2016	USM Alger	21	(1)
2014–2015	→ MO Béjaïa (loan)	28	(2)
2016	DRB Tadjenanet	12	(2)
2016–2018	USM Bel-Abbès	15	(1)
2018–2019	CR Belouizdad	19	(2)
2019–2021	CA Bizertin	51	(2)
2021–2022	Kazma		
2022–2023	Abu Salem		
2023	Al Urooba		
- * Club domestic league appearances and goals as of 19:56, 1 December 2019 (UTC)

Djamel Eddine Chettal (born May 23, 1992) is an Algerian footballer, who primarily plays as a winger.

== Club career ==
In July 2014, Chettal signed a two-year contract with MO Béjaïa (MOB), joining the club on loan from USM Alger.

== Honours ==
=== Club ===
USM Alger

- Algerian Ligue Professionnelle 1 (2): 2013-14, 2015-16
- Algerian Cup (1): 2013
- Algerian Super Cup (1): 2013
- UAFA Club Cup (1): 2013

MO Béjaïa

- Algerian Cup: 2015
