= Salim Benali =

Algerian footballer (born 1986)

Personal information
- Date of birth: 3 December 1986 (age 39)
- Place of birth: Oran, Algeria
- Position: Defender

Team information
- Current team: MC El Eulma
- Number: 26

Senior career*
Years	Team	Apps	(Gls)
–2013	ES Mostaganem	–	(–)
2013–2014	ESM Koléa	–	(–)
2014–2016	MO Béjaïa	50	(0)
2016	MC Oran	5	(0)
2017–2018	MO Béjaïa	0	(0)
2018–	MC El Eulma	0	(0)
- * Club domestic league appearances and goals as of 2018

Salim Benali is an Algerian footballer, born 3 December 1986 in Oran. He plays as a defender for MC El Eulma in the Algerian Ligue Professionnelle 2.
