= RC Arbaâ =

Algerian football club

- Full name: Raed Club Arbaâ
- Nicknames: RCA, Blues
- Founded: February 27, 1941; 85 years ago as Raed Club Arbéen
- Ground: Ismaïl Makhlouf Stadium
- Capacity: 5,000
- League: Ligue 2
- 2025–26: Ligue 2, Group Centre-west, 13th of 16
Home colours	Away colours

Raed Club Arbaâ (Arabic: أمل الأربعاء), known as RC Arbaâ or simply RCA for short, is an Algerian football club located in Larbaâ. The club was founded in 1941 and its colours are blue and white. Their home stadium, the Ismaïl Makhlouf Stadium, has a capacity of some 5,000 spectators. The club is currently playing in the Algerian Ligue Professionnelle 1.

== History ==
In 2012, RC Arba finished first in the Groupe Centre of the 2011–12 Ligue Nationale du Football Amateur to win promotion to the Algerian Ligue Professionnelle 2, marking their return to the second division after a twelve-year absence. The following season, they finished second in the 2012-13 Algerian Ligue Professionnelle 2 to win promotion to the Algerian Ligue Professionnelle 1 for the first time.

On July 18, 2021, RC Arbaâ were promoted to the Algerian Ligue Professionnelle 1.

== Managers ==
- (Algeria) Samir Boudjaarane
- (Algeria) Tahar Chérif El-Ouazzani (2013–2014)
- (Algeria) Mohamed Mekhazni (2014–2014)
- (Serbia) Darko Janackovic (2014–2014)
- (Algeria) Mohamed Mihoubi (2014–2015)
- (Algeria) Billel Dziri (2015–2015)
- (Serbia) Darko Janackovic (2015–)
