= MO Béjaïa =

Algerian football team

MO Béjaïa Muludya Ulampik n Vgayet ⵎⵓⵍⵓⴷⵢⴰ ⵓⵍⴰⵎⴱⵉⴽ ⵏ ⴱⴳⴰⵢⴻⵜ
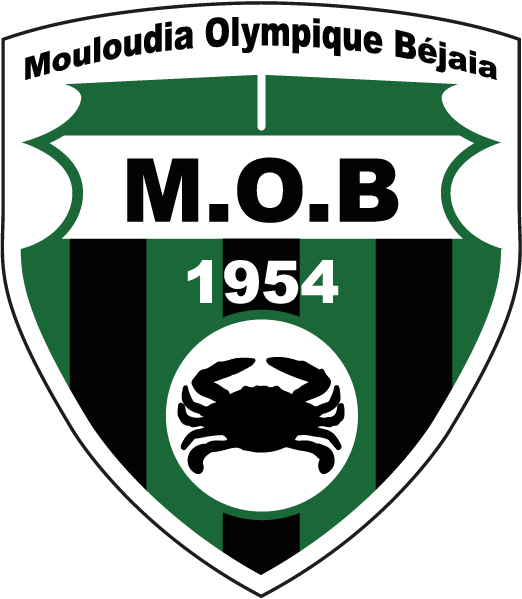
- Full name: Mouloudia Olympique de Béjaïa; Muludya Ulampik n Vgayet ⵎⵓⵍⵓⴷⵢⴰ ⵓⵍⴰⵎⴱⵉⴽ ⵏ ⴱⴳⴰⵢⴻⵜ
- Nickname: The Crabs
- Founded: 1954
- Ground: Maghrebi Unity Stadium
- Capacity: 17,500
- League: Ligue 2
- 2025–26: Ligue 2, Group Centre-east, 4th of 16
Home colours	Away colours

Mouloudia Olympique de Béjaïa (Arabic: مولودية بجاية; Kabyle: Muludya Ulampik n Vgayet; Tamazight: ⵎⵓⵍⵓⴷⵢⴰ ⵓⵍⴰⵎⴱⵉⴽ ⵏ ⴱⴳⴰⵢⴻⵜ), referred to commonly as MO Béjaïa or MOB for short, is a professional Algerian football club based in Béjaïa, Kabylia, Algeria. The club was founded in 1954 and its colours are green and black. Their home stadium, Maghrebi Unity Stadium, has a capacity of 17,500 spectators. The club is currently playing in the Algerian Ligue 2.

== History ==
In May 2015, MO Béjaïa won the Algerian Cup, its first national title, after beating RC Arbaâ 1–0 in the 2015 final. In the 2016–17 Algerian top division, MOB drew an average home attendance of 11,000. Only MC Alger (13,000) and MC Oran (12,000) had a higher average home attendance in that season. On 10 May 2025 MO Béjaïa returned to the Ligue 2 after three years of absence.

== Honours ==
=== Domestic competitions ===
- Algerian Ligue Professionnelle 1
  - Runners-up (1): 2014–15
- Algerian Cup
  - Winners (1): 2015
- Algerian Super Cup
  - Runners-up (1): 2015

=== International competitions ===
- CAF Confederation Cup
  - Runners-up (1): 2016

== Managers ==
- (Algeria) Djaâfar Harouni (September 2003 – December 2003)
- (Algeria) Abdelhamid Azeroual (December 2003 – March 2004)
- (Algeria) Noureddine Saâdi (July 2005 – June 2006)
- (Romania) Dan Anghelescu (July 2007 – December 2007)
- (Algeria) Hamid Rahmouni (July 1, 2011 – Sept 21, 2013)
- (Algeria) Fawzi Moussouni (interim) (Sept 22, 2013 – Sept 27, 2013)
- (Algeria) Abdelkader Amrani (September 2013 – June 2015)
- (Switzerland) Alain Geiger (June 2015 – September 2015)
- (Algeria) Abdelkader Amrani (September 2015 – May 2016)
- (Algeria) Nacer Sandjak (June 2016–)

== Rival clubs ==
- (Algeria) JSM Béjaïa (Derby)
- (Algeria) USM Alger (Rivalry)
- (Algeria) CS Constantine (Rivalry)
- (Algeria) MC Oran (Rivalry)
- (Algeria) CRB Aïn Fakroun (Rivalry)
- (Algeria) MC El Eulma (Rivalry)
- (Algeria) CA Bordj Bou Arreridj (Rivalry)
