= 2012–13 JSM Béjaïa season =

JSM Béjaïa
2012–13 season
- Chairman: Boualem Tiab
- Head coach: Alain Michel (until 21 January 2013); Giovanni Solinas (from 24 January 2013)
- Stadium: Stade de l'Unité Maghrébine
- Ligue 1: 11th
- Algerian Cup: Round of 32
- Champions League: Second round
- Confederation Cup: Play-off round
- Top goalscorer: League: Toufik Zerara (9); All: Toufik Zerara (10)

In the 2012–13 season, JSM Béjaïa competed in the Ligue 1 for the 13th season, as well as the Algerian Cup. They competed in Ligue 1, the Algerian Cup the Champions League and the Confederation Cup.

== Squad list ==
Players and squad numbers last updated on 18 November 2010.
Note: Flags indicate national team as has been defined under FIFA eligibility rules. Players may hold more than one non-FIFA nationality.

No.	Nat.	Position	Name	Date of birth (age)	Signed from
Goalkeepers
Defenders
Midfielders
Forwards

== Competitions ==
=== Overview ===
Competition	Record								Started round	Final position / round	First match	Last match
Competition	G	W	D	L	GF	GA	GD	Win %	Started round	Final position / round	First match	Last match
Ligue 1	30	9	11	10	28	32	−4	30.00	—N/a	11th	15 September 2012	21 May 2013
Algerian Cup	2	1	0	1	2	2	+0	50.00	Round of 64	Round of 32	15 December 2012	29 December 2012
Champions League	6	1	4	1	4	2	+2	16.67	Preliminary round	Second round	6 December 2012	18 February 2013
Confederation Cup	2	0	1	1	3	4	−1	0.00	Play-off round		18 May 2013	2 June 2013
Total	40	11	16	13	37	40	−3	27.50				

Updated to match played 9 May 2017
Source: Competitions

== League table ==
Pos	Team	Pld	W	D	L	GF	GA	GD	Pts
9	JS Saoura	30	10	8	12	28	26	+2	38
10	ASO Chlef	30	10	8	12	26	29	−3	38
11	JSM Béjaïa	30	9	11	10	28	32	−4	38
12	MC Oran	30	8	10	12	33	41	−8	34
13	CA Bordj Bou Arréridj	30	7	12	11	20	26	−6	33

Updated to match(es) played on 21 May 2013. Source: DZFoot
Rules for classification: 1) points; 2) head-to-head points; 3) head-to-head goal difference; 4) goal difference; 5) total goals; 6) fairplay ranking; 7) playoff.

=== Results summary ===
Overall								Home						Away					
Pld	W	D	L	GF	GA	GD	Pts	W	D	L	GF	GA	GD	W	D	L	GF	GA	GD
30	9	11	10	28	32	−4	38	6	7	2	17	12	+5	3	4	8	11	20	−9

Last updated: 29 December 2014.
Source: Competitive matches

=== Results by round ===
Round	1	2	3	4	5	6	7	8	9	10	11	12	13	14	15	16	17	18	19	20	21	22	23	24	25	26	27	28	29	30
Ground	A	A	H	A	H	A	H	A	H	A	H	A	H	A	H	H	H	A	H	A	H	A	H	A	H	A	H	A	H	A
Result	W	W	W	D	D	L	D	L	W	W	W	L	W	L	D	L	L	L	D	L	D	D	W	D	D	D	W	L	D	L
Position																														11

Source: Competitive matches
A = Away; H = Home; W = Win; D = Draw; L = Loss

=== Matches ===
15 September 2012 Round 1	MC Oran	0–2	JSM Béjaïa	Oran
18:00		Report	50' Boussaha; 87' Zerara	Stadium: Ahmed Zabana Stadium; Referee: Rafik Achouri

18 September 2012 Round 2	USM Bel-Abbès	0–1	JSM Béjaïa	Sidi Bel Abbès
18:00		Report	50' Zerara	Stadium: Stade 24 Fevrier 1956; Referee: Mehdi Abid Charef

22 September 2012 Round 3	JSM Béjaïa	1–0	CR Belouizdad	Béjaïa
18:00	Bourakba 32'	Report		Stadium: Stade de l'Unité Maghrébine; Referee: Mohamed Benouza

29 September 2012 Round 4	CS Constantine	2–2	JSM Béjaïa	Constantine
17:45	Boulemdaïs 70', 88' (pen.)	Report	58' Bahloul; 73' Derrag	Stadium: Stade Mohamed Hamlaoui; Referee: Merzak Halalchi

5 October 2012 Round 5	JSM Béjaïa	1–1	MC Alger	Béjaïa
16:45	Boulemdaïs 69' (pen.)	Report	85' Djallit	Stadium: Stade de l'Unité Maghrébine; Referee: Djamel Haimoudi

16 October 2012 Round 6	JS Kabylie	2–1	JSM Béjaïa	Tizi Ouzou
17:45	Rial 38'; Messadia 45+1'	Report	90+4' Mebarki	Stadium: Stade du 1er Novembre 1954; Referee: Mohamed Saïdi

20 October 2012 Round 7	JSM Béjaïa	1–1	MC El Eulma	Béjaïa
18:00	Mebarki 38'	Report	9' Gharbi	Stadium: Stade de l'Unité Maghrébine; Referee: Mohamed Bachir

23 October 2012 Round 8	ES Sétif	1–0	JSM Béjaïa	Sétif
17:45	Aoudia 86'	Report		Stadium: Stade 8 Mai 1945; Referee: Mokhtar Amalou

3 November 2012 Round 9	JSM Béjaïa	1–0	CA Bordj Bou Arreridj	Béjaïa
18:00	Mebarki 18'	Report		Stadium: Stade de l'Unité Maghrébine; Referee: Mohamed Ghorbal

10 November 2012 Round 10	CA Batna	0–2	JSM Béjaïa	Batna
15:00		Report	27' Bahloul; 83' Zerara	Stadium: November 1, 1954 Stadium; Referee: Mohamed Bichari

17 November 2012 Round 11	JSM Béjaïa	2–0	USM El Harrach	Béjaïa
17:45	Zerara 7'; Niati 59'	Report		Stadium: Stade de l'Unité Maghrébine; Referee: Rafik Achouri

24 November 2012 Round 12	WA Tlemcen	1–0	JSM Béjaïa	Tlemcen
15:00	Belgherri 83' (pen.)	Report		Stadium: Stade Akid Lotfi; Referee: Merzak Halalchi

1 December 2012 Round 13	JSM Béjaïa	2–0	USM Alger	Béjaïa
18:00	Megatli 43'; Zerara 90' (pen.)	Report		Stadium: Stade de l'Unité Maghrébine; Referee: Mohamed Benouza

8 December 2012 Round 14	JS Saoura	3–0	JSM Béjaïa	Béchar
15:00	Metrani 4'; Beldjilali 46', 90+2'	Report		Stadium: Stade 20 Août 1955; Referee: Mokhtar Amalou

22 December 2012 Round 15	JSM Béjaïa	1–1	ASO Chlef	Béjaïa
18:00	Mebarakou 73'	Report	34' Nessakh	Stadium: Stade de l'Unité Maghrébine; Referee: Redouane Necib

15 January 2013 Round 16	JSM Béjaïa	0–1	MC Oran	Béjaïa
18:00		Report	85' Berradja	Stadium: Stade de l'Unité Maghrébine; Referee: Mehdi Abid Charef

19 January 2013 Round 17	JSM Béjaïa	1–3	USM Bel-Abbès	Béjaïa
15:00	Zerara 26'	Report	9' El Bahari; 77' (pen.) Belhadi; 86' Belguerfi	Stadium: Stade de l'Unité Maghrébine; Referee: Said Aouina

26 January 2013 Round 18	CR Belouizdad	4–1	JSM Béjaïa	Belouizdad
15:00	Benaldjia 10' (pen.), 58'; Anane 71'; Dahar 87'	Report	56' (pen.) Zerara	Stadium: Stade 20 Août 1955; Referee: Mohamed Bichari

2 February 2013 Round 19	JSM Béjaïa	0–0	CS Constantine	Béjaïa
17:45		Report		Stadium: Stade de l'Unité Maghrébine; Referee: Mohamed Bachir

9 February 2013 Round 20	MC Alger	3–1	JSM Béjaïa	Algiers
15:00	Djallit 39' (pen.); Yachir 63', 71'	Report	51' (pen.) Zerara	Stadium: Stade Omar Hamadi; Attendance: 0 (close doors); Referee: Redouane Necib

19 February 2013 Round 21	JSM Béjaïa	2–2	JS Kabylie	Béjaïa
15:00	Mebarki 32'; Zeghli 48'	Report	41' Belkalem; 45' Messadia	Stadium: Stade de l'Unité Maghrébine; Attendance: 0 (close doors); Referee: Mohamed Ghorbal

23 February 2013 Round 22	MC El Eulma	0–0	JSM Béjaïa	El Eulma
18:00		Report		Stadium: Stade Messaoud Zougar; Referee: Abderrezzak Arab

8 March 2013 Round 23	JSM Béjaïa	2–1	ES Sétif	Béjaïa
17:45	Mebarki 21', 71'	Report	59' Nadji	Stadium: Stade de l'Unité Maghrébine; Referee: Merzak Halalchi

19 March 2013 Round 24	CA Bordj Bou Arreridj	0–0	JSM Béjaïa	Bordj Bou Arréridj
18:00		Report		Stadium: Stade 20 Août 1955; Referee: Mohamed Saïdi

16 April 2013 Round 25	JSM Béjaïa	1–1	CA Batna	Béjaïa
19:00	Zerara 37' (pen.)	Report	56' Benayada	Stadium: Stade de l'Unité Maghrébine; Referee: Mohamed Benouza

27 April 2013 Round 26	USM El Harrach	1–1	JSM Béjaïa	Algiers
18:00	Bounedjah 90+3'	Report	45+1' Bangoura	Stadium: Stade 1er Novembre 1954; Referee: Mohamed Bichari

7 May 2013 Round 27	JSM Béjaïa	1–0	WA Tlemcen	Béjaïa
17:00	Coulibaly 62'	Report		Stadium: Stade de l'Unité Maghrébine; Referee: Abderrezzak Arab

11 May 2013 Round 28	USM Alger	1–0	JSM Béjaïa	Algiers
17:00	Seguer 65'	Report		Stadium: Stade Omar Hamadi; Referee: Mohamed Ghorbal

14 May 2013 Round 29	JSM Béjaïa	1–1	JS Saoura	Béjaïa
17:00	Bangoura 56'	Report	55' Hamzaoui	Stadium: Stade de l'Unité Maghrébine; Referee: Mokhtar Amalou

21 May 2013 Round 30	ASO Chlef	2–0	JSM Béjaïa	Chlef
17:00	Ali Hadji 36'; Merzougi 89'	Report		Stadium: Stade Mohamed Boumezrag; Referee: Bouaza Chenane

== Algerian Cup ==
15 December 2012 Round of 64	JSM Béjaïa	2–1	ASM Oran	Béjaïa
15:00	Zerara 15'; Dembri 71'	Repport	27' Yahia	Stadium: Stade de l'Unité Maghrébine; Referee: El Merid

29 December 2012 Round of 32	CR Belouizdad	1–0	JSM Béjaïa	Belouizdad
14:00	Angan 50'	Repport		Stadium: Stade 20 Août 1955; Referee: Boubekeur Zouaoui

== Champions League ==
=== Preliminary round ===
15 February 2013	JSM Béjaïa (Algeria)	3–0	(Niger) Olympic Niamey	Béjaïa
17:00 UTC+1	Megateli 8'; Mebarki 48'; Derrag 78'	Report		Stadium: Stade de l'Unité Maghrébine; Referee: Yakhouba Keita (Guinea)

1 March 2013	Olympic Niamey (Niger)	0–0	(Algeria) JSM Béjaïa	Niamey
15:00 UTC+1		Report		Stadium: Stade Général Seyni Kountché; Referee: Maguette N'Diaye (Senegal)

=== First round ===
15 March 2013	JSM Béjaïa (Algeria)	0–0	(Ghana) Asante Kotoko	Béjaïa
19:00 UTC+1		Report		Stadium: Stade de l'Unité Maghrébine; Referee: Ousmane Fall (Senegal)

7 April 2013	Asante Kotoko (Ghana)	1–1	(Algeria) JSM Béjaïa	Kumasi
14:00 UTC±0	Akuffu 45'	Report	Derrag 72'	Stadium: Baba Yara Stadium; Referee: Bakary Gassama (Gambia)

=== Second round ===
20 April 2013	JSM Béjaïa (Algeria)	0–0	(Tunisia) Espérance de Tunis	Béjaïa
18:00 UTC+1		Report		Stadium: Stade de l'Unité Maghrébine; Referee: Koman Coulibaly (Mali)

4 May 2013	Espérance de Tunis (Tunisia)	1–0	(Algeria) JSM Béjaïa	Radès
16:00 UTC+1	Chammam 77' (pen.)	Report		Stadium: Stade Olympique de Radès; Referee: Yakhouba Keita (Guinea)

== Confederation Cup ==
=== Play-off round ===
18 May 2013	JSM Béjaïa (Algeria)	2–2	(Tunisia) Étoile du Sahel	Béjaïa
19:00 UTC+1	Derrag 26'; Ferguène 59'	Report	Belaïd 36'; Dramé 86'	Stadium: Stade de l'Unité Maghrébine; Referee: Rédouane Jiyed (Morocco)

2 June 2013	Étoile du Sahel (Tunisia)	2–1	(Algeria) JSM Béjaïa	Sousse
17:00 UTC+1	Sassi 47' (pen.); Asante 77'	Report	Derrag 43'	Stadium: Stade Olympique de Sousse; Referee: Ousmane Fall (Senegal)

== Squad information ==
=== Playing statistics ===
No.	Pos	Nat	Player	Total		Ligue 1		Algerian Cup		Champions League		Confederation Cup	
No.	Pos	Nat	Player	Apps	Goals	Apps	Goals	Apps	Goals	Apps	Goals	Apps	Goals
Goalkeepers
12	GK	(Algeria) ALG	Yacine Djebarat	10	0	9	0	1	0	0	0	0	0
16	GK	(Algeria) ALG	Cédric Si Mohamed	21	0	20	0	1	0	0	0	0	0
22	GK	(Algeria) ALG	Yaâkoub Sameur	2	0	2	0	0	0	0	0	0	0
Defenders
13	DF	(Algeria) ALG	Brahim Zafour	23	0	22	0	1	0	0	0	0	0
18	DF	(Algeria) ALG	Amine Megateli	21	1	19	1	2	0	0	0	0	0
27	DF	(Algeria) ALG	Nassim Boukemacha	22	0	20	0	2	0	0	0	0	0
3	DF	(Algeria) ALG	Rachid Mekheldi	20	0	20	0	0	0	0	0	0	0
20	DF	(Algeria) ALG	Mokhtar Megueni	4	0	3	0	1	0	0	0	0	0
15	DF	(Algeria) ALG	Zidane Mebarakou	28	1	26	1	2	0	0	0	0	0
31	DF	(Algeria) ALG	Ahmed Cheheima	18	0	18	0	0	0	0	0	0	0
4	DF	(Mali) MLI	Moussa Coulibaly	8	1	8	1	0	0	0	0	0	0
21	DF	(Algeria) ALG	Larbi Hammouche	8	0	8	0	0	0	0	0	0	0
30	DF	(Algeria) ALG	Hocine Laribi	22	0	21	0	1	0	0	0	0	0
	DF	(Algeria) ALG	Tarek Bouabta	1	0	1	0	0	0	0	0	0	0
Midfielders
26	MF	(Algeria) ALG	Toufik Zerara	29	10	27	9	2	1	0	0	0	0
7	MF	(Algeria) ALG	Saïd Mehamha	9	0	8	0	1	0	0	0	0	0
9	MF	(Algeria) ALG	Belkacem Niati	26	1	25	1	1	0	0	0	0	0
8	MF	(Algeria) ALG	Abou El Kacem Hadji	17	0	15	0	2	0	0	0	0	0
	MF	(Algeria) ALG	Mohamed Nadir Ziane	2	0	2	0	0	0	0	0	0	0
11	MF	(Algeria) ALG	Bilal Bahloul	10	2	10	2	0	0	0	0	0	0
14	MF	(Algeria) ALG	Emmanuel Hannachi	2	0	1	0	1	0	0	0	0	0
	MF	(Algeria) ALG	Samir Bensayah	4	0	4	0	0	0	0	0	0	0
	MF	(Algeria) ALG	Sofiane Kraouche	2	0	2	0	0	0	0	0	0	0
Forwards
	FW	(Algeria) ALG	Lahlouh	2	0	0	0	2	0	0	0	0	0
	FW	(Algeria) ALG	Arezki Hamza Dambri	2	1	1	0	1	1	0	0	0	0
10	FW	(Algeria) ALG	Mohamed Derrag	26	1	24	1	2	0	0	0	0	0
19	FW	(Algeria) ALG	Ramzi Bourakba	6	1	6	1	0	0	0	0	0	0
28	FW	(Algeria) ALG	Lakdar Boussaha	17	2	17	2	0	0	0	0	0	0
23	FW	(Algeria) ALG	Mohamed Lamine Aoures	7	0	6	0	1	0	0	0	0	0
38	FW	(Algeria) ALG	Nabil Aït Fergane	23	0	22	0	1	0	0	0	0	0
11	FW	(Mali) MLI	Boubacar Bangoura	8	2	8	2	0	0	0	0	0	0
17	FW	(Algeria) ALG	Billel Mebarki	24	6	23	6	1	0	0	0	0	0
5	FW	(Algeria) ALG	Kamel Zeghli	10	1	9	1	1	0	0	0	0	0
20	FW	(Algeria) ALG	Mohamed Debeka	3	0	3	0	0	0	0	0	0	0
Players transferred out during the season

Last updated: 24 November 2017
Source: fr.soccerway.com

=== Goalscorers ===
Includes all competitive matches. The list is sorted alphabetically by surname when total goals are equal.

No.	Nat.	Player	Pos.	L 1	AC	CL 1	C 3	TOTAL
26	(Algeria)	Toufik Zerara	MF	10	1	0	0	11
17	(Algeria)	Billel Mebarki	FW	6	0	1	0	7
10	(Algeria)	Mohamed Derrag	FW	1	0	2	2	5
18	(Algeria)	Amine Megateli	DF	1	0	2	0	3
11	(Algeria)	Bilal Bahloul	MF	2	0	0	0	2
28	(Algeria)	Lakdar Boussaha	FW	2	0	0	0	2
?	(Algeria)	Arezki Hamza Dambri	FW	1	1	0	0	2
11	(Mali)	Boubacar Bangoura	FW	2	0	0	0	2
15	(Algeria)	Zidane Mebarakou	DF	1	0	0	0	1
4	(Mali)	Moussa Coulibaly	DF	1	0	0	0	1
9	(Algeria)	Belkacem Niati	MF	1	0	0	0	1
19	(Algeria)	Ramzi Bourakba	FW	1	0	0	0	1
5	(Algeria)	Kamel Zeghli	FW	1	0	0	0	1
38	(Algeria)	Nabil Aït Fergane	FW	0	0	0	1	1
Own Goals				0	0	0	0	0
Totals				28	2	4	3	37

== Transfers ==
=== In ===
Date	Pos	Player	From club	Transfer fee	Source
15 June 2012	FW	(Algeria) Ramzi Bourakba	(Saudi Arabia) Najran SC	Free transfer	
25 June 2012	DF	(Algeria) Mokhtar Megueni	MC Saïda	Undisclosed	
30 June 2012	DF	(Algeria) Nassim Boukemacha	MC Oran	Loan Return	
1 July 2012	FW	(Algeria) Arezki Hamza Dambri	AS Aïn M'lila	Free transfer	
1 July 2012	DF	(Algeria) Rachid Mekheldi	Unattached	Free transfer	
1 July 2012	DF	(Algeria) Larbi Hammouche	Reserve team	First Professional Contract	
1 July 2012	DF	(Algeria) Ahmed Cheheima	USM Alger Reserve team	Undisclosed	
1 July 2012	MF	(Algeria) Bilal Bahloul	CS Constantine	Undisclosed	
1 July 2012	MF	(Algeria) Belkacem Niati	Olympique de Médéa	Undisclosed	
1 July 2012	FW	(Algeria) Billel Mebarki	ASM Oran	Undisclosed	
1 July 2012	MF	(Algeria) Abou El Kacem Hadji	WA Tlemcen	Free transfer	
2 July 2012	DF	(Algeria) (France) Omar Benzerga	(France) FC Nantes	Free transfer	
13 July 2012	MF	(Algeria) (France) Saïd Mehamha	(France) Olympique Lyonnais B	Free transfer	
30 July 2012	MF	(Algeria) (France) Emmanuel Hannachi	(France) USC Corte	Undisclosed	
7 August 2012	FW	(Algeria) (France) Lakdar Boussaha	(France) Racing Besançon	Free transfer	
4 December 2012	DF	(Mali) Moussa Coulibaly	(Mali) Stade Malien	Undisclosed	
4 December 2012	FW	(Mali) Boubacar Bangoura	(Mali) Djoliba AC	Undisclosed	
1 January 2013	FW	(Algeria) Kamel Zeghli	Reserve team	First Professional Contract	
11 January 2013	MF	(Algeria) (France) Samir Bensayah	(Cyprus) Akritas Chlorakas	Undisclosed	

=== Out ===
Date	Pos	Player	To club	Transfer fee	Source
2012	MF	(Algeria) Tayeb Maroci	JS Kabylie	Free transfer	
28 May 2012	DF	(Algeria) Adel Maïza	USM Alger	Free transfer	
1 August 2012	DF	(Algeria) Lyès Saïdi	ASO Chlef	Undisclosed	
1 January 2013	DF	(Algeria) Mokhtar Megueni	MC Saïda	Loan	
1 January 2013	FW	(Algeria) Arezki Hamza Dambri	RC Arbaâ	Loan	
1 January 2013	MF	(Algeria) Bilal Bahloul	CS Constantine	Undisclosed	
