= 2014–15 RC Arbaâ season =

RC Arbaâ
2014–15 season
- President: Djamel Amani
- Head coach: Mohamed Mekhazni (from 8 June 2014) (until 24 September 2014); Mohamed Kherbache (C); Darko Janacković (from 16 October 2014) (until 17 November 2014); Mohamed Mihoubi (from 18 November 2014)
- Stadium: Stade Ismaïl Makhlouf
- Ligue 1: 10th
- Algerian Cup: Runners–up
- Top goalscorer: League: Oussama Darfalou (12); All: Oussama Darfalou (14)

In the 2014–15 season, RC Arbaâ is competing in the Ligue 1 for the 2nd season, as well as the Algerian Cup. They will be competing in Ligue 1, and the Algerian Cup.

== Squad list ==
Players and squad numbers last updated on 16 August 2014.
Note: Flags indicate national team as has been defined under FIFA eligibility rules. Players may hold more than one non-FIFA nationality.

No.	Nat.	Position	Name	Date of birth (age)	Signed from
Goalkeepers
31	(Algeria)	GK	Mohamed Fellah	14 November 1982 (aged 32)	(Algeria) CA Bordj Bou Arreridj
22	(Algeria)	GK	Sid Ahmed Rafik Mazouzi	1 February 1989 (aged 25)	(Algeria) USM Alger
	(Algeria)	GK	Mohamed Alaouchiche	11 April 1993 (aged 21)	Youth system
Defenders
4	(Algeria)	CB	Abdelaziz Ali Guechi	7 September 1990 (aged 24)	(Algeria) CA Bordj Bou Arreridj
5	(France) (Algeria)	RB	Mohamed Reda Maarif	28 March 1990 (aged 24)	(France) FC Bourg-Péronnas
24	(Algeria)	CB	Nasreddine Zaâlani	26 July 1992 (aged 22)	(Algeria) Youth system
25	(Algeria)	CB	Hamza Zeddam	8 April 1984 (aged 30)	(Algeria) MC Alger
30	(Algeria)	RB	Hussein Boukatouh	29 January 1991 (aged 23)	Youth system
35	(Algeria)	RB	Ahmed Cheheima	8 April 1992 (aged 22)	(Algeria) JSM Béjaïa
46	(Algeria)	CB	Messaoud Derouaoui	21 September 1994 (aged 20)	(Algeria) Youth system
64	(Algeria)	LB	Houari Ferhani	11 February 1993 (aged 21)	(Algeria) USM Alger
	(Algeria)	CB	Saber Chebana	17 March 1983 (aged 31)	(Algeria) MO Béjaïa
	(Algeria)	CB	Oussama Zouak	10 December 1986 (aged 28)	(Algeria) WA Tlemcen
Midfielders
	(Algeria)		El Bahi Lazaref	3 March 1980 (aged 34)	(Algeria)
18	(Algeria)	DM	Farid Daoud	25 August 1989 (aged 25)	(Algeria) MC Alger
	(Cameroon)		Bertrand Owoundi	19 March 1987 (aged 27)	(Cameroon) Coton Sport FC de Garoua
10	(Algeria)	AM	Hocine Harrouche	9 December 1987 (aged 27)	(Algeria) NA Hussein Dey
78	(Algeria)	DM	Mehdi Kacem	8 August 1986 (aged 28)	(Algeria) MC Alger
8	(Algeria)	AM	Abdelmalek Mokdad	5 May 1986 (aged 28)	(Algeria) JS Kabylie
16	(Algeria)	DM	Bilal Moumen	16 February 1990 (aged 24)	(Algeria) MC Alger
55	(Algeria)	DM	Nassim Yettou	11 February 1994 (aged 20)	(Algeria) MO Béjaïa
27	(Algeria)	AM	Abdellah El Moudene	27 March 1992 (aged 22)	(Algeria) MO Béjaïa
98	(Algeria)	DM	Elyes Seddiki	27 September 1988 (aged 26)	(Portugal) S.C. Beira-Mar
Forwards
6	(Algeria)	RW	Zineddine Bensalem	25 May 1990 (aged 24)	(Algeria) MC Alger
9	(Chad)	LW	Morgan Betorangal	25 August 1988 (aged 26)	(Luxembourg) F91 Dudelange
21	(Algeria)	ST	Djamel Bouaïcha	19 June 1982 (aged 32)	(Algeria) MC Oran
	(Algeria)		Ramzi Bourakba	20 December 1984 (aged 30)	(Algeria) CR Belouizdad
13	(Algeria)	ST	Oussama Darfalou	29 September 1993 (aged 21)	(Algeria) USM Alger
92	(Ivory Coast)	ST	Ghislain Guessan	15 September 1992 (aged 22)	(France) Tours FC
20	(France) (Algeria)	RW	Rafik Bouderbal	19 September 1987 (aged 27)	(France) FC Bourg-Péronnas
66	(Algeria)	LW	Sofiane Nedjar	9 May 1989 (aged 25)	(Algeria) Paradou AC

== Competitions ==
=== Overview ===
Competition	Record								Started round	Final position / round	First match	Last match
Competition	G	W	D	L	GF	GA	GD	Win %	Started round	Final position / round	First match	Last match
Ligue 1	30	12	4	14	28	35	−7	40.00	—N/a	10th	16 August 2014	29 May 2015
Algerian Cup	6	3	2	1	6	3	+3	50.00	Round of 64	Runners–up	13 December 2014	2 May 2015
Total	36	15	6	15	34	38	−4	41.67				

=== Ligue 1 ===
==== League table ====
Pos	Team	Pld	W	D	L	GF	GA	GD	Pts
8	USM Alger	30	10	11	9	35	27	+8	41 (Note: USMA 1-2 ASMO; ASMO 1-0 USMA)
9	NA Hussein Dey	30	10	10	10	23	22	+1	40 (Note: NAHD 3-0 RCA; RCA 0-1 NAHD)
10	RC Arbaâ	30	12	4	14	28	35	−7	40
11	JS Saoura	30	10	9	11	26	29	−3	39 (Note: JSS: 9 points; MCA: 6 points; JSK: 3 points)
12	MC Alger	30	10	9	11	33	31	+2	39

Updated to match(es) played on 29 May 2015. Source: DZFoot
Rules for classification: 1) points; 2) head-to-head points; 3) head-to-head goal difference; 4) goal difference; 5) total goals; 6) fairplay ranking; 7) playoff

==== Results summary ====
Overall								Home						Away					
Pld	W	D	L	GF	GA	GD	Pts	W	D	L	GF	GA	GD	W	D	L	GF	GA	GD
30	12	4	14	28	35	−7	40	10	3	2	18	6	+12	2	1	12	10	29	−19

Last updated: 29 December 2014.
Source: Competitive matches

==== Results by round ====
Round	1	2	3	4	5	6	7	8	9	10	11	12	13	14	15	16	17	18	19	20	21	22	23	24	25	26	27	28	29	30
Ground	A	H	A	H	A	H	A	H	A	H	A	H	A	H	A	H	A	H	A	H	A	H	A	H	A	H	A	H	A	H
Result	W	L	L	W	L	D	L	W	L	W	L	D	L	W	W	W	L	W	L	W	L	W	L	W	L	L	L	D	D	W
Position	5	9	11	7	11	12	14	12	13	10	13	12	14	12	10	8	8	8	9	8	8	7	7	5	7	10	12	13	13	10

Updated to match(es) played on 29 December 2014. Source: Competitive matches
A = Away; H = Home; W = Win; D = Draw; L = Loss

==== Matches ====
16 August 2014 1	USM El Harrach	0–1	RC Arbaâ	Réghaïa
17:00		Report	12' Darfalou	Stadium: Stade Boualem Bourada; Referee: Houasnia, Badache, Boulekrinet

23 August 2014 2	RC Arbaâ	0–1	CS Constantine	Larbaâ
17:00		Report	32' Rouabah	Stadium: Stade Ismaïl Makhlouf; Referee: Bekouassa, Bounoua, Bourouba

16 September 2014 3	MC Oran	2–0	RC Arbaâ	Oran
19:00	Nekkache 33'; Ali Guechi 77' (o.g.)	Report		Stadium: Stade Ahmed Zabana; Referee: Aouina, Benaissa, Chenoua

20 September 2014 4	RC Arbaâ	2–0	USM Alger	Larbaâ
16:00	Mokdad 5' (pen.); Darfalou (yellow card) 44' (goal) 90+3'; Ali Guechi (yellow card) 13'; Ferhani (yellow card) 19'; Yettou (yellow card) 34'; Zeddam (yellow card) 60'; Fellah (yellow card) 66' (yellow-red card) 90+5'	Report	(yellow card) 3' Meftah; (yellow card) 34' Khoualed; (yellow card) 55' Bouchema	Stadium: Stade Ismaïl Makhlouf; Attendance: 10.000; Referee: Benbrahem, Djabellah, Allaoua

27 September 2014 5	USM Bel-Abbès	1–0	RC Arbaâ	Sidi Bel Abbès
17:45	Achiou 42'	Report		Stadium: Stade 24 Fevrier 1956; Referee: Bouchama, Aouina, Kéchida

2 October 2014 6	RC Arbaâ	0–0	MC El Eulma	Larbaâ
16:00		Report		Stadium: Stade Ismaïl-Makhlouf; Referee: Amalou, Azrine, Rachedi

18 October 2014 7	ASO Chlef	2–0	RC Arbaâ	Chlef
16:00	Haddouche 13'; Tedjar 45+1' (pen.)	Report		Stadium: Stade Mohamed Boumezrag; Referee: Saidi, Cherina, Rezguène

25 October 2014 8	RC Arbaâ	2–1	JS Saoura	Larbaâ
15:00	Darfalou 12'; Guessan 87'	Report	11' Aoudou	Stadium: Stade Ismaïl Makhlouf; Referee: Nader, Messali, Belhocine

1 November 2014 9	MO Béjaïa	2–0	RC Arbaâ	Béjaïa
18:00	Rahal 12' (pen.); Yaya 82'	Report		Stadium: Stade de l'Unité Maghrébine; Referee: Necib, Meghlout, Benacer

8 November 2014 10	RC Arbaâ	1–0	ASM Oran	Larbaâ
15:00	Mokdad 55' (pen.)	Report		Stadium: Stade Ismaïl Makhlouf; Referee: Achouri, Amri, Bougherara

22 November 2014 11	NA Hussein Dey	3–0	RC Arbaâ	Algiers
16:00	Ahmed Benyahia 3'; Benayad 69'; Ouznadji 89'	Report		Stadium: Stade du 20 Août 1955; Referee: Arab, Bazine, Bayoud

29 November 2014 12	RC Arbaâ	1–1	ES Sétif	Larbaâ
15:00	Bouaïcha 75'	Report	82' Zerara	Stadium: Stade Ismaïl Makhlouf; Referee: Bassiri, Hallem, Berrachou

5 December 2014 13	JS Kabylie	2–1	RC Arbaâ	Algiers
17:30	Rial 35' (pen.); Si Ammar 68'	Report	38' Darfalou	Stadium: Stade Omar Hammadi; Attendance: 0 (close doors); Referee: Bachir, Abid, El-Hadj Saïd

20 December 2014 14	RC Arbaâ	2–0	CR Belouizdad	Larbaâ
14:30	Yettou 11'; Darfalou 48'	Report		Stadium: Stade Ismaïl Makhlouf; Referee: Gherbal, Serradj, Cherchar

30 December 2014 15	MC Alger	0–2	RC Arbaâ	Algiers
16:00		Report	27' Ferhani; 31' Darfalou	Stadium: Stade Omar Hammadi; Referee: Saïdi, Bechirene, Rezgane

20 January 2015 16	RC Arbaâ	1–0	USM El Harrach	Larbaâ
14:00	Darfalou 76'	Report		Stadium: Stade Ismaïl Makhlouf; Attendance: 0 (close doors); Referee: Necib, Tamen, Maghlout

24 January 2015 17	CS Constantine	2–0	RC Arbaâ	Constantine
16:00	Boulemdaïs 52', 61' (pen.)	Report		Stadium: Stade Mohamed Hamlaoui; Referee: Mial, Idir, Semsoum

31 January 2015 18	RC Arbaâ	1–0	MC Oran	Larbaâ
16:00	Mokdad 75'	Report		Stadium: Stade Ismaïl Makhlouf

6 February 2015 19	USM Alger	5–1	RC Arbaâ	Algiers
16:00	Belaïli 3'; Meftah 23' (pen.); Ferhat 77' (pen.); Benkhemassa 84'; Manucho 90+1'	Report	51' Harrouche	Stadium: Stade Omar Hammadi; Referee: Zouaoui, Aouina, Kechidi

14 February 2015 20	RC Arbaâ	2–0	USM Bel-Abbès	Larbaâ
15:00	Bouaïcha 21'; Mokdad 85'	Report		Stadium: Stade Ismaïl Makhlouf; Referee: Benbraham, Chaballah, Allaoua

24 February 2015 21	MC El Eulma	2–0	RC Arbaâ	El Eulma
16:00	Abbès 27'; Derrardja 31'	Report		Stadium: Stade Messaoud Zougar; Referee: Boukhalfa, Atachali, Zerhouni

6 March 2015 22	RC Arbaâ	3–1	ASO Chlef	Larbaâ
15:00	Semahi 1' (o.g.); Darfalou 81'; Harrouche 90'	Report	90' Sakombou	Stadium: Stade Ismaïl Makhlouf; Referee: Boukouassa, Bounoua, Rachedi

21 March 2015 23	JS Saoura	2–1	RC Arbaâ	Béchar
15:00	Sayah 18' (pen.); Terbah 68'	Report	62' Darfalou	Stadium: Stade 20 Août 1955; Referee: Nadher, Serradj, Rezgane

28 March 2015 24	RC Arbaâ	1–0	MO Béjaïa	Larbaâ
16:00	El Mouden 90'	Report		Stadium: Stade Ismaïl Makhlouf; Referee: Amalou, Brahim, Azrine

18 April 2015 25	ASM Oran	3–2	RC Arbaâ	Oran
16:00	Benayada 5'; Belalem 21'; Djemaouni 80'	Report	45' Daoud; 90' (o.g.) Benayada	Stadium: Stade Ahmed Zabana; Referee: Brahimi, Azouz, Merzoug

25 April 2015 26	RC Arbaâ	0–1	NA Hussein Dey	Larbaâ
17:00		Report	29' Benayad	Stadium: Stade Ismaïl Makhlouf; Attendance: 0 (close doors); Referee: Boukoussa, Mokrani, Bourouba

9 May 2015 27	ES Sétif	2–1	RC Arbaâ	Sétif
17:00	Benyettou 51'; Belameiri 80'	Report	69' Darfalou	Stadium: Stade 8 Mai 1945; Referee: Hlalchi, Brahim, Doulache

16 May 2015 28	RC Arbaâ	0–0	JS Kabylie	Larbaâ
17:00		Report		Stadium: Stade Ismaïl Makhlouf; Referee: Necib, Meghlout, Bennacer

23 May 2015 29	CR Belouizdad	1–1	RC Arbaâ	Algiers
17:00	Draoui 73'	Report	90' Darfalou	Stadium: Stade 20 Août 1955; Referee: Amalou, Benbachir, Remouche

29 May 2015 30	RC Arbaâ	2–1	MC Alger	Larbaâ
17:00	Darfalou 48'; Yettou 69'	Report	90+1' Khiter	Stadium: Stade Ismaïl Makhlouf; Referee: Housnia, Seradj, Etchiali

== Algerian Cup ==
12 December 2014 Round of 64	MSP Batna	0–1	RC Arbaâ	Batna
14:30			Darfalou 89'	Stadium: Stade 1er Novembre 1954; Referee: Mohamed Benouza

27 December 2014 Round of 32	AHM Hassi Messaoud	1–3	RC Arbaâ	Ouargla
14:00	Tahra 32'		Ferhani 20'; Bouaicha 47'; Darfalou 77'	Stadium: Olympic Ouargla Stadium; Referee: Zouaoui, Aouina, Benrouane

20 February 2015 Round of 16	CRB Aïn Fakroun	0–1 (a.e.t.)	RC Arbaâ	Aïn M'lila
15:00			Mokdad 109'	Stadium: Stade des Frères Demane Debih; Referee: Mohamed Bichari

13 March 2015 Quarter-finals	NA Hussein Dey	1–1 (a.e.t.) (1–3 p)	RC Arbaâ	Algiers
16:00	Ndouassel 81'		Zeddam 90+4'	Stadium: Stade 20 Août 1955; Referee: Redouane Necib
	Penalties
	Metref (penalty scored); Boukhenchouche (penalty missed); Bendebka (penalty missed)		(penalty scored) Mokdad; (penalty scored) Seddiki; (penalty missed) Darfalou; (penalty scored) El Moudene

11 April 2015 Semi-finals	RC Arbaâ	0–0 (a.e.t.) (3–0 p)	ASO Chlef	Bologhine
15:00				Stadium: Stade Omar Hammadi; Referee: Mehdi Abid Charef

2 May 2015 Final	MO Béjaïa	1–0	RC Arbaâ	Blida
16:00	Zahir Zerdab 43'	Report		Stadium: Stade Mustapha Tchaker; Referee: Mohamed Bichari

== Squad information ==
=== Playing statistics ===
No.	Pos	Nat	Player	Total		Ligue 1		Algerian Cup	
No.	Pos	Nat	Player	Apps	Goals	Apps	Goals	Apps	Goals
Goalkeepers
	GK	(Algeria) ALG	[Mohamed Fellah	0	0	0	0	0	0
	GK	(Algeria) ALG	Sid Ahmed Rafik Mazouzi	0	0	0	0	0	0
	GK	(Algeria) ALG	Mohamed Alaouchiche	0	0	0	0	0	0
Defenders
	DF	(Algeria) ALG	Zineddine Bensalem	0	0	0	0	0	0
	DF	(Algeria) ALG	Hussein Boukatouh	0	0	0	0	0	0
	DF	(Algeria) ALG	Saber Chebana	0	0	0	0	0	0
	DF	(Algeria) ALG	Ahmed Cheheima	0	0	0	0	0	0
	DF	(Algeria) ALG	Houari Ferhani	0	0	0	0	0	0
	DF	(Algeria) ALG	Nasreddine Zaâlani	0	0	0	0	0	0
	DF	(Algeria) ALG	Hamza Zeddam	0	0	0	0	0	0
	DF	(Algeria) ALG	Mohamed Reda Maarif	0	0	0	0	0	0
Midfielders
	MF	(Algeria) ALG	El Bahi Lazaref	0	0	0	0	0	0
	MF	(Algeria) ALG	Rafik Bouderbal	0	0	0	0	0	0
	MF	(Algeria) ALG	Farid Daoud	0	0	0	0	0	0
	MF	(Cameroon) CMR	Bertrand Owoundi	0	0	0	0	0	0
	MF	(Algeria) ALG	Hocine Harrouche	0	0	0	0	0	0
	MF	(Algeria) ALG	Mehdi Kacem	0	0	0	0	0	0
	MF	(Algeria) ALG	Abdelmalek Mokdad	0	0	0	0	0	0
	MF	(Algeria) ALG	Bilal Moumen	0	0	0	0	0	0
	MF	(Algeria) ALG	Mohamed Nassim Yettou	0	0	0	0	0	0
	MF	(Algeria) ALG	Abdellah El Moudene	0	0	0	0	0	0
	MF	(Algeria) ALG	Elyes Seddiki	0	0	0	0	0	0
	MF	(Chad) CHA	Morgan Betorangal	0	0	0	0	0	0
Forwards
	FW	(Algeria) ALG	Djamel Bouaïcha	0	0	0	0	0	0
	FW	(Algeria) ALG	Ramzi Bourakba	0	0	0	0	0	0
	FW	(Algeria) ALG	Oussama Darfalou	0	0	0	0	0	0
	FW	(Ivory Coast) CIV	Ghislain Guessan	0	0	0	0	0	0
	FW	(Algeria) ALG	Sofiane Nedjar	0	0	0	0	0	0
Players transferred out during the season

Last updated: 8 June 2019
Source: fr.soccerway.com

=== Goalscorers ===
Includes all competitive matches. The list is sorted alphabetically by surname when total goals are equal.

No.	Nat.	Player	Pos.	Ligue 1	Cup	TOTAL
13	(Algeria)	Oussama Darfalou	FW	12	2	14
4	(Algeria)	Abdelmalek Mokdad	MF	4	1	5
21	(Algeria)	Djamel Bouaïcha	FW	2	1	3
10	(Algeria)	Hocine Harrouche	MF	2	0	2
55	(Algeria)	Mohamed Nassim Yettou	MF	2	0	2
34	(Algeria)	Houari Ferhani	DF	1	1	2
18	(Algeria)	Farid Daoud	MF	1	0	1
-	(Algeria)	Abdellah El Moudene	MF	1	0	1
-	(Ivory Coast)	Ghislain Guessan	FW	1	0	1
25	(Algeria)	Hamza Zeddam	DF	0	1	1
Own Goals				2	0	2
Totals				28	6	34

== Transfers ==
=== In ===
Date	Pos	Player	From club	Transfer fee	Source
1 July 2014	CB	(Algeria) Nasreddine Zaâlani	AS Khroub	Free transfer	
1 July 2014	CB	(Algeria) Abdelaziz Ali Guechi	CA Bordj Bou Arreridj	Free transfer	
1 July 2014	RB	(Algeria) Ahmed Cheheima	JSM Béjaïa	Free transfer	
1 July 2014	DM	(Algeria) Farid Daoud	MC Alger	Free transfer	
1 July 2014	LW	(Algeria) Sofiane Nedjar	Paradou AC	Free transfer	
1 July 2014	RW	(Algeria) Rafik Bouderbal	(France) FC Bourg-Péronnas	Free transfer	
1 July 2014	RW	(Algeria) Zineddine Bensalem	MC Alger	Free transfer	
1 July 2014	FW	(Algeria) Mohamed Derrag	CS Constantine	Free transfer	
1 July 2014	ST	(Ivory Coast) Ghislain Guessan	Unattached	Free transfer	
5 July 2014	GK	(Algeria) Sid Ahmed Rafik Mazouzi	USM Alger	Free transfer	
5 July 2014	DM	(Algeria) Bilal Moumen	MC Alger	Free transfer	
14 July 2014	CB	(Algeria) Saber Chebana	MO Béjaïa	Free transfer	
14 July 2014	ST	(Algeria) Djamel Bouaïcha	MC Oran	Free transfer	
17 July 2014	FW	(Algeria) Ramzi Bourakba	CR Belouizdad	Free transfer	
22 July 2014	LB	(Algeria) Houari Ferhani	USM Alger	Free transfer	
29 July 2014	AM	(Algeria) Hocine Harrouche	JS Kabylie	Free transfer	
1 January 2015	LW	(Chad) Morgan Betorangal	(Luxembourg) F91 Dudelange	Free transfer	
14 January 2015	RB	(Algeria) Mohamed Reda Maarif	(France) FC Bourg-Péronnas	Free transfer	
15 January 2015	DM	(Algeria) Elyes Seddiki	(Portugal) Beira-Mar	Free transfer	
1 August 2014	ST	(Algeria) Oussama Darfalou	USM Alger	Free transfer	
