= 2013–14 JSM Béjaïa season =

JSM Béjaïa
2013–14 season
- Chairman: Boualem Tiab
- Head coach: Noureddine Saâdi (until 26 September 2013); Kamel Djabour (from 7 October 2013) (until March 2013); Hassan Hammouche (from March 2013)
- Stadium: Stade de l'Unité Maghrébine
- Ligue 1: 14th
- Algerian Cup: Round of 32
- Top goalscorer: League: Sofiane Meddahi (5); All: Sofiane Meddahi (5)

In the 2013–14 season, JSM Béjaïa competed in the Ligue 1 for the 14th season, as well as the Algerian Cup. They competed in Ligue 1, and the Algerian Cup.

== Competitions ==
=== Overview ===
Competition	Record								Started round	Final position / round	First match	Last match
Competition	G	W	D	L	GF	GA	GD	Win %	Started round	Final position / round	First match	Last match
Ligue 1	30	7	7	16	24	44	−20	23.33	—N/a	14th	24 August 2013	24 May 2014
Algerian Cup	2	1	0	1	4	3	+1	50.00	Round of 64	Round of 32	6 December 2013	20 December 2013
Total	32	8	7	17	28	47	−19	25.00				

Updated to match played 9 May 2017
Source: Competitions

== League table ==
Pos	Team	Pld	W	D	L	GF	GA	GD	Pts	Qualification or relegation
12	MC Oran	30	9	8	13	33	40	−7	35	
13	CR Belouizdad	30	9	5	16	26	33	−7	32	
14	JSM Béjaïa (R)	30	7	7	16	24	44	−20	28	Relegation to Ligue Professionnelle 2
15	CA Bordj Bou Arréridj (R)	30	4	9	17	23	47	−24	21	Relegation to Ligue Professionnelle 2
16	CRB Aïn Fakroun (R)	30	5	5	20	16	39	−23	20	Relegation to Ligue Professionnelle 2

Updated to match(es) played on 22 May 2014. Source: DZFoot
Rules for classification: 1) points; 2) head-to-head points; 3) head-to-head goal difference; 4) goal difference; 5) total goals; 6) fairplay ranking; 7) playoff.
(R) Relegated

=== Results summary ===
Overall								Home						Away					
Pld	W	D	L	GF	GA	GD	Pts	W	D	L	GF	GA	GD	W	D	L	GF	GA	GD
30	7	7	16	24	44	−20	28	4	5	6	14	18	−4	3	2	10	10	26	−16

Last updated: 29 December 2014.
Source: Competitive matches

=== Results by round ===
Round	1	2	3	4	5	6	7	8	9	10	11	12	13	14	15	16	17	18	19	20	21	22	23	24	25	26	27	28	29	30
Ground	H	A	H	A	H	A	H	A	H	A	H	A	H	A	H	A	H	A	H	A	H	A	H	A	H	A	H	A	H	A
Result	L	D	D	L	D	L	D	L	D	L	D	D	W	L	W	L	L	L	L	L	W	L	L	W	L	W	W	L	L	W
Position																														

Updated to match(es) played on 29 December 2014. Source: Competitive matches
A = Away; H = Home; W = Win; D = Draw; L = Loss

=== Matches ===
24 August 2013 Round 1	JSM Béjaïa	0–1	MC Alger	Béjaïa
17:45		Report	40' Djallit	Stadium: Stade de l'Unité Maghrébine; Referee: Mohamed Ghorbal

31 August 2013 Round 2	RC Arbaâ	1–1	JSM Béjaïa	Blida
17:00	M'Changama 47'	Report	57' A. Belgherbi	Stadium: Stade Frères Brakni; Referee: Mohamed Bichari

3 September 2013 Round 3	JSM Béjaïa	1–1	ASO Chlef	Béjaïa
18:00	Coulibaly 7' (pen.)	Report	25' Daham	Stadium: Stade de l'Unité Maghrébine; Referee: Sofiane Bousseter

24 September 2013 Round 4	ES Sétif	5–0	JSM Béjaïa	Sétif
18:00	El Okbi 18'; Karaoui 19', 90+3'; Gourmi 45+1', 61'	Report		Stadium: Stade 8 Mai 1945; Referee: Mohamed Chokri Bechirène

21 September 2013 Round 5	JSM Béjaïa	1–1	CA Bordj Bou Arréridj	Béjaïa
18:00	Coulibaly 32' (pen.)	Report	86' H. Hamiche	Stadium: Stade de l'Unité Maghrébine; Referee: Djamel Haimoudi

28 September 2013 Round 6	JS Kabylie	1–0	JSM Béjaïa	Tizi Ouzou
16:45	Ebossé Bodjongo 33'	Report		Stadium: Stade 1er Novembre 1954; Referee: Mustapha Ghorbal

5 October 2013 Round 7	JSM Béjaïa	1–1	MC El Eulma	Béjaïa
18:00	Coulibaly 35'	Report	39' (pen.) Hamiti	Stadium: Stade de l'Unité Maghrébine; Referee: Mohamed Bachir

19 October 2013 Round 8	USM El Harrach	3–0	JSM Béjaïa	Algiers
15:00	I. Sylla 17'; Boumechra 62' (pen.); Belkaroui 72' (pen.)	Report		Stadium: Stade 1er Novembre 1954; Referee: Rafik Achouri

25 October 2013 Round 9	JSM Béjaïa	0–0	MO Béjaïa	Béjaïa
16:45		Report		Stadium: Stade de l'Unité Maghrébine; Referee: Mohamed Benouza

2 November 2013 Round 10	JS Saoura	2–0	JSM Béjaïa	Béchar
15:00	Aoudou 10', 64'	Report		Stadium: Stade 20 Août 1955; Referee: Merzak Halalchi

9 November 2013 Round 11	JSM Béjaïa	1–1	CRB Aïn Fakroun	Béjaïa
18:00	Bangoura 74' (pen.)	Report	66' H. Sahbi	Stadium: Stade de l'Unité Maghrébine; Referee: Mokhtar Amalou

23 November 2013 Round 12	CS Constantine	1–1	JSM Béjaïa	Constantine
16:00	Maïza 62'	Report	85' A. Belgherbi	Stadium: Stade Mohamed Hamlaoui; Referee: Mohamed Saïdi

30 November 2013 Round 13	JSM Béjaïa	1–0	MC Oran	Béjaïa
18:00	L. Hammouche 6'	Report		Stadium: Stade de l'Unité Maghrébine; Referee: Amine Sekhraoui

14 December 2013 Round 14	USM Alger	1–0	JSM Béjaïa	Algiers
18:00	Ziaya 71'	Report		Stadium: Stade Omar Hamadi; Referee: Youssef Zerrouki

28 December 2013 Round 15	JSM Béjaïa	1–0	CR Belouizdad	Béjaïa
15:00	O. Meddahi 70'	Report		Stadium: Stade de l'Unité Maghrébine; Referee: Mohamed Ghorbal

18 January 2014 Round 16	MC Alger	2–1	JSM Béjaïa	Algiers
16:00	Djallit 72', 90+5' (pen.)	Report	21' Niati	Stadium: Stade Omar Hamadi; Referee: Mohamed Saïdi

1 February 2014 Round 17	JSM Béjaïa	0–1	RC Arbaâ	Béjaïa
15:00		Report	68' Bougueroua	Stadium: Stade de l'Unité Maghrébine; Referee: Rafik Achouri

8 February 2014 Round 18	ASO Chlef	2–1	JSM Béjaïa	Chlef
18:00	A. Farhi 15'; Messaoud 56'	Report	77' (pen.) O. Meddahi	Stadium: Stade Mohamed Boumezrag; Referee: Mohamed Bachir

15 February 2014 Round 19	JSM Béjaïa	0–2	ES Sétif	Béjaïa
15:00		Report	77' Karaoui; 90+2' Nadji	Stadium: Stade de l'Unité Maghrébine; Referee: Sofiane Bousseter

22 February 2014 Round 20	CA Bordj Bou Arréridj	3–1	JSM Béjaïa	Bordj Bou Arréridj
15:00	Kerim 13', 48', 73'	Report	75' (pen.) O. Meddahi	Stadium: Stade 20 Août 1955; Referee: Mohamed Ghorbal

1 March 2014 Round 21	JSM Béjaïa	2–1	JS Kabylie	Béjaïa
17:00	Niati 24'; Chalali 90+3'	Report	38' Aouedj	Stadium: Stade de l'Unité Maghrébine; Referee: Redouane Necib

8 March 2014 Round 22	MC El Eulma	2–1	JSM Béjaïa	El Eulma
15:00	Hamiti 7' (pen.), 24'	Report	81' Zeghli	Stadium: Stade Messaoud Zougar; Referee: Youssef Zerrouki

25 March 2014 Round 23	JSM Béjaïa	1–2	USM El Harrach	Béjaïa
15:00	Zeghli 90' (pen.)	Report	32' Abid; 39' Younès	Stadium: Stade de l'Unité Maghrébine; Referee: Mohamed Saïdi

22 March 2014 Round 24	MO Béjaïa	0–1	JSM Béjaïa	Béjaïa
18:00		Report	77' I. Tatem	Stadium: Stade de l'Unité Maghrébine; Referee: Mokhtar Amalou

26 April 2014 Round 25	JSM Béjaïa	1–4	JS Saoura	Béjaïa
15:00	O. Meddahi 37' (pen.)	Report	16' Aoudou; 24', 46' Belkheir; 49' M. Amri	Stadium: Stade de l'Unité Maghrébine; Referee: Lyés Bekouassa

3 May 2014 Round 26	CRB Aïn Fakroun	0–1	JSM Béjaïa	Aïn M'lila
16:00		Report	90+1' I. Tatem	Stadium: Stade des Frères Demane Debbih; Attendance: 0 (close doors); Referee: Boubekeur Zouaoui

10 May 2014 Round 27	JSM Béjaïa	3–1	CS Constantine	Béjaïa
17:00	F. Benmansour 24'; T. Bouabta 58'; I. Tatem 88'	Report	29' Boulemdaïs	Stadium: Stade de l'Unité Maghrébine; Referee: Mustapha Bessiri

13 May 2014 Round 28	MC Oran	3–1	JSM Béjaïa	Oran
17:00	Berradja 2'; Benyettou 60'; Dagoulou 70'	Report	50' B. Bensaha	Stadium: Ahmed Zabana Stadium; Referee: Merzak Halalchi

17 May 2014 Round 29	JSM Béjaïa	1–2	USM Alger	Béjaïa
17:00	B. Mellel 90+1'	Report	5' Gasmi; 73' Nsombo	Stadium: Stade de l'Unité Maghrébine; Attendance: 0 (close doors); Referee: Abderrezzak Arab

24 May 2014 Round 30	CR Belouizdad	0–1	JSM Béjaïa	Algiers
17:00		Report	86' N. Aït Fergane	Stadium: Stade 20 Août 1955; Referee: Mohamed Boukhalfa

== Algerian Cup ==
20 December 2013 Round of 32	MC Oran	2–1 (a.e.t.)	JSM Béjaïa	Oran
17:00	Kouriba 70'; Amrane 111'	Repport	90' (pen.) Coulibaly	Stadium: Stade Ahmed Zabana; Referee: Arab, Bazine, Chenaoua

== Squad information ==
=== Playing statistics ===
No.	Pos	Nat	Player	Total		Ligue 1		Algerian Cup	
No.	Pos	Nat	Player	Apps	Goals	Apps	Goals	Apps	Goals
Goalkeepers
16	GK	(Algeria) ALG	Laurent Messara	4	0	4	0	0	0
	GK	(Algeria) ALG	Yacine Djebarat	8	0	8	0	0	0
1	GK	(Algeria) ALG	Yaâkoub Samer	1	0	1	0	0	0
22	GK	(Algeria) ALG	Sofiane Kacem	17	0	17	0	0	0
Defenders
13	DF	(Algeria) ALG	Brahim Zafour	17	0	17	0	0	0
18	DF	(Algeria) ALG	Amine Megateli	5	0	5	0	0	0
27	DF	(Algeria) ALG	Nassim Boukemacha	22	0	22	0	0	0
15	DF	(Algeria) ALG	Zidane Mebarakou	29	0	29	0	0	0
31	DF	(Algeria) ALG	Ahmed Cheheima	17	0	17	0	0	0
4	DF	(Mali) MLI	Moussa Coulibaly	23	3	23	3	0	0
21	DF	(Algeria) ALG	Larbi Hammouche	23	1	23	1	0	0
30	DF	(Algeria) ALG	Hocine Laribi	13	0	13	0	0	0
33	DF	(Algeria) ALG	Hocine Laribi	18	1	18	1	0	0
14	DF	(Algeria) ALG	Oussama Meddahi	27	4	27	4	0	0
6	DF	(Algeria) ALG	Farès Aggoune	16	0	16	0	0	0
	DF	(Algeria) ALG	Farouk Benmansour	7	1	7	1	0	0
Midfielders
9	MF	(Algeria) ALG	Belkacem Niati	19	2	19	2	0	0
	MF	(Republic of the Congo) CGO	David Louhoungou	3	0	3	0	0	0
24	MF	(Algeria) ALG	Salem Mezriche	1	0	1	0	0	0
8	MF	(Algeria) ALG	Ismail Tatem	20	3	20	3	0	0
	MF	(Algeria) ALG	Benamar Mellal	2	1	2	1	0	0
20	MF	(Algeria) ALG	Abdelouahid Belgherbi	12	2	12	2	0	0
	MF	(Algeria) ALG	Hicham Bouyousfi	4	0	4	0	0	0
31	MF	(Algeria) ALG	Karim Aroul	3	0	3	0	0	0
37	MF	(Algeria) ALG	Abderrahmane Saighi	13	0	13	0	0	0
	MF	(Algeria) ALG	Billel Bensaha	4	1	4	1	0	0
Forwards
10	FW	(Algeria) ALG	Mohamed Chalali	16	0	16	0	0	0
	FW	(Algeria) ALG	Mohamed Lamine Aoures	3	0	3	0	0	0
38	FW	(Algeria) ALG	Nabil Aït Fergane	18	0	18	0	0	0
	FW	(Mali) MLI	Boubacar Bangoura	10	0	10	0	0	0
	FW	(Algeria) ALG	Billel Mebarki	9	0	9	0	0	0
5	FW	(Algeria) ALG	Kamel Zeghli	11	0	11	0	0	0
	FW	(Algeria) ALG	Rafik Lahlou	4	0	4	0	0	0
	FW	(Algeria) ALG	Mohamed Debeka	1	0	1	0	0	0
7	FW	(Algeria) ALG	Khaled Bouziani	12	0	12	0	0	0
	FW	(Algeria) ALG	Karim Aribi	3	0	3	0	0	0
	FW	(Algeria) ALG	Ahmed Ait Mohand	1	0	1	0	0	0
Players transferred out during the season

Last updated: 13 October 2017
Source: fr.soccerway.com

== Transfers ==
=== In ===
Date	Pos	Player	From club	Transfer fee	Source
1 July 2013	GK	(Algeria) Yaâkoub Sameur	Reserve team	First Professional Contract	
1 July 2013	DF	(Algeria) Tarek Bouabta	Reserve team	First Professional Contract	
1 July 2013	DF	(Algeria) Farès Aggoune	Paradou AC	Undisclosed	
1 July 2013	MF	(Algeria) Oussama Meddahi	Paradou AC	Undisclosed	
1 July 2013	MF	(Algeria) Ismail Tatem	USM El Harrach	Free transfer	
1 July 2013	MF	(Algeria) Mohamed Nadir Ziane	Reserve team	First Professional Contract	
1 July 2013	FW	(Algeria) Abdelouahid Belgherbi	ES Mostaganem	Undisclosed	
1 July 2013	MF	(Algeria) Khaled Bouziani	ES Mostaganem	Undisclosed	
8 July 2013	GK	(France) (Algeria) Laurent Messara	(France) US Fleury Foot	Free transfer	
8 July 2013	MF	(France) (Algeria) Salem Mezriche	(France) SR Colmar	Free transfer	
10 July 2013	MF	(Algeria) Abderrahmane Saighi	ES Sétif Reserve team	First Professional Contract	
11 July 2013	GK	(Algeria) Sofiane Kacem	Academie FAF	Undisclosed	
16 July 2013	FW	(Algeria) Mohamed Chalali	ES Sétif	Undisclosed	
20 November 2013	GK	(Algeria) Yacine Djebarat	?	Free transfer	
1 December 2013	MF	(Algeria) Farouk Benmansour	Reserve team	First Professional Contract	
5 January 2014	MF	(Republic of the Congo) David Louhoungou	(France) AS Beauvais	Undisclosed	
