= 2015–16 RC Arbaâ season =

RC Arbaâ
2015–16 season
- President: Djamel Amani
- Head coach: Billel Dziri (until 10 September 2015); Darko Janacković (from 12 September 2015) (until 20 October 2015); Khaled Lounici (from 29 January 2016) (until 20 February 2016)
- Stadium: Stade Ismaïl Makhlouf
- Ligue 1: 15th
- Algerian Cup: Round of 16
- Top goalscorer: League: Ghislain Guessan (9); All: Ghislain Guessan (10)

In the 2015–16 season, RC Arbaâ is competing in the Ligue 1 for the 3rd season, as well as the Algerian Cup. They will be competing in Ligue 1, and the Algerian Cup.

== Competitions ==
=== Overview ===
Competition	Record								Started round	Final position / round	First match	Last match
Competition	G	W	D	L	GF	GA	GD	Win %	Started round	Final position / round	First match	Last match
Ligue 1	30	4	7	19	31	55	−24	13.33	—N/a	15th	15 August 2015	27 May 2015
Algerian Cup	3	2	0	1	4	3	+1	66.67	Round of 64	Round of 16	19 December 2015	20 February 2016
Total	33	6	7	20	35	58	−23	18.18				

== League table ==
Pos	Team	Pld	W	D	L	GF	GA	GD	Pts	Qualification or relegation
12	MC Alger	30	8	14	8	28	26	+2	38	Qualification for the Confederation Cup preliminary round
13	RC Relizane	30	8	12	10	36	35	+1	36 (Note: RC Relizane ahead of USM Blida on head-to-head record: RCR–USB 5–2, USB–RCR 1–0.)	
14	USM Blida (R)	30	7	15	8	20	29	−9	36	Relegation to Ligue Professionnelle 2
15	RC Arbaâ (R)	30	4	7	19	31	55	−24	19	Relegation to Ligue Professionnelle 2
16	ASM Oran (R)	30	5	3	22	21	54	−33	18	Relegation to Ligue Professionnelle 2

Updated to match(es) played on 27 May 2016. Source: DZFoot
Rules for classification: 1) points; 2) head-to-head points; 3) head-to-head goal difference; 4) goal difference; 5) total goals; 6) fairplay ranking; 7) playoff.
(R) Relegated

=== Results summary ===
Overall								Home						Away					
Pld	W	D	L	GF	GA	GD	Pts	W	D	L	GF	GA	GD	W	D	L	GF	GA	GD
30	4	7	19	31	55	−24	19	4	4	7	19	22	−3	0	3	12	12	33	−21

Last updated: 31 January 2015.
Source: Competitive matches

=== Results by round ===
Round	1	2	3	4	5	6	7	8	9	10	11	12	13	14	15	16	17	18	19	20	21	22	23	24	25	26	27	28	29	30
Ground	A	H	A	H	A	H	A	H	A	H	A	H	A	H	A	H	A	H	A	H	A	H	A	H	A	H	A	H	A	H
Result	L	L	L	D	D	L	L	L	D	D	W	D	L	L	L	L	D	L	L	D	W	L	W	L	W	L	L	L	L	L
Position	16	16	16	16	16	16	16	16	16	16	16	16	16	16	16	16	16	16	16	16	16	16	16	16	15	15	15	15	15	15

Updated to match(es) played on 31 January 2015. Source: Competitive matches
A = Away; H = Home; W = Win; D = Draw; L = Loss

=== Matches ===
Win Draw Loss

15 August 2015 Round 1	RC Arbaâ	0–2	MO Béjaïa	Blida
17:00		Report; Live TV: Algérie 3 / Canal Algérie	14' Zerdab; 83' Mebarki	Stadium: Stade Mustapha Tchaker; Referee: Arab, Beyoud, Hamraoui

22 August 2015 Round 2	CR Belouizdad	3–1	RC Arbaâ	Belouizdad
18:00	Feham 23'; Derrag 25'; Ngomo 65'	Report; Live TV: None	40' Meziane	Stadium: Stade 20 Août 1955; Attendance: 0 (close doors); Referee: Benouza, Omari, Brahim

29 August 2015 Round 3	RC Arbaâ	0–1	RC Relizane	Larbaâ
17:00		Report; Live TV: None	27' Bourdim	Stadium: Stade Ismaïl Makhlouf; Referee: Bouslimani, Belbachir, Rimouche

12 September 2015 Round 4	JS Saoura	1–1	RC Arbaâ	Béchar
19:00	Zaïdi 28'	Report; Live TV: None	40' Guessan	Stadium: Stade 20 Août 1955; Referee: Zouaoui, Kechida, Haltim

18 September 2015 Round 5	RC Arbaâ	1–1	USM Blida	Blida
17:00	Guessan 53'	Report; Live TV: TV Tamazight 4 / beIN Sports	62' Bedrane	Stadium: Stade Mustapha Tchaker; Referee: Benouza, Omari, Ayad

28 September 2015 Round 6	ASM Oran	2–0	RC Arbaâ	Oran
16:30	Djemaouni 75' (pen.); Bentiba 90'	Report; Live TV: None		Stadium: Stade Ahmed Zabana; Referee: Necib, Maghlout, Benaceur

16 October 2015 Round 8	USM El Harrach	3–1	RC Arbaâ	El Harrach
16:00	Bouguèche 40'; Aït Ouamar 43' (pen.); Harrag 77' (pen.)	Report; Live TV: None	69' Guessan	Stadium: Stade 1er Novembre 1954; Referee: Mial, Salaouadji, Idir

20 October 2015 Round 7	RC Arbaâ	1–2	USM Alger	Larbaâ
16:00	Guessan 30'	Report; Live TV: None	8' Andria; 89' Boudebouda	Stadium: Stade Ismaïl Makhlouf; Referee: Brahmia, Chaballah, Femssoum

24 October 2015 Round 9	RC Arbaâ	2–2	DRB Tadjenanet	Blida
16:00	Zaâlani 32'; Harrouche 87'	Report; Live TV: None	41', 83' Sayoud	Stadium: Stade Frères Brakni; Attendance: 0 (close doors); Referee: Benouza, Ammari, Ayed

29 October 2015 Round 10	MC Alger	3–3	RC Arbaâ	Algiers
18:00	Abid 21'; Karaoui 56'; Hachoud 66'	Report; Live TV: None	73' Yettou; 82' Guessan; 90' Mahsas	Stadium: Stade 5 Juillet 1962; Referee: Bouzrar, Semsoum, Idir

6 November 2015 Round 11	RC Arbaâ	3–1	NA Hussein Dey	Larbaâ
15:00	Khaled 4'; Guessan 56'; Mahsas 59'	Report; Live TV: None	90' Bendebka	Stadium: Stade Ismaïl Makhlouf; Referee: Benbraham, Goumari, Allaoua

20 November 2015 Round 12	RC Arbaâ	1–1	JS Kabylie	Larbaâ
15:00	Guessan 6' (pen.)	Report; Live TV: None	72' (pen.) Boulaouidet	Stadium: Stade Ismaïl Makhlouf; Referee: Aouina, Benaicha, Benhamoud

27 November 2015 Round 13	ES Sétif	1–0	RC Arbaâ	Sétif
16:00	Benyettou 14'	Report; Live TV: Canal Algérie		Stadium: Stade 8 Mai 1945; Referee: Boukouassa, Bounoua et Rachedi

12 December 2015 Round 14	RC Arbaâ	2–3	MC Oran	Larbaâ
15:00	Yettou 7'; Guessan 60'	Report; Live TV: None	23', 73' Benyahia; 46' Berradja	Stadium: Stade Ismaïl Makhlouf; Referee: Necib, Benacer, Meghenout

26 December 2015 Round 15	CS Constantine	1–0	RC Arbaâ	Constantine
16:00	Bezzaz 20' (pen.)	Report; Live TV: None		Stadium: Stade Mohamed Hamlaoui; Referee: Amalou

16 January 2016 Round 16	MO Béjaïa	2–1	RC Arbaâ	Béjaïa
16:00	Ndoye 12'; Zerdab 28' (pen.)	Report; Live TV: None	33' Mahsas	Stadium: Stade de l'Unité Maghrébine; Referee: Boukhalfa, Benali, Zerhouni

23 January 2016 Round 17	RC Arbaâ	0–0	CR Belouizdad	Larbaâ
15:00		Report; Live TV: None		Stadium: Stade Ismaïl Makhlouf; Referee: Achouri, Tamen, Boulflefel

30 January 2016 Round 18	RC Relizane	3–1	RC Arbaâ	Relizane
15:00	Tiaïba 18'; Bourdim 20'; Manucho 72'	Report; Live TV: None	32' Yettou	Stadium: Stade Tahar Zoughari; Referee: Bouzerar, Yahia, Messaoud

6 February 2016 Round 19	RC Arbaâ	0–1	JS Saoura	Larbaâ
15:00		Report; Live TV: None	47' Hammar	Stadium: Stade Ismaïl Makhlouf; Referee: Zouaoui, Chita, Hitem

13 February 2016 Round 20	USM Blida	1–1	RC Arbaâ	Blida
15:00	Abed 25'	Report	10' Taib	Stadium: Stade Mustapha Tchaker; Referee: Zouaoui, Kechida, Haliti

27 February 2016 Round 21	RC Arbaâ	2–1	ASM Oran	Larbaâ
16:00	Yettou 63'; Yachir 72'	Report; Live TV: None	76' Aouad	Stadium: Stade Ismaïl Makhlouf; Referee: Bouzerar, Yahi, Messaoudi

12 March 2016 Round 22	USM Alger	4–0	RC Arbaâ	Bologhine
18:00	Darfalou 29'; Seguer 42'; Nadji 76'; Benmoussa 86'	Report; Live TV: TV Tamazight 4		Stadium: Stade Omar Hammadi; Referee: Bachir, Serradj, Abid

19 March 2016 Round 23	RC Arbaâ	3–1	USM El Harrach	Larbaâ
16:00	Bouteldja 47'; Mahsas 54'; Meziane 90'	Report; Live TV: None	66' Coumbassa	Stadium: Stade Ismaïl Makhlouf; Referee: Bouzerar, Chablah, Lasoui

1 April 2016 Round 24	DRB Tadjenanet	2–1	RC Arbaâ	Tadjenanet
15:00	Chibane 11' (pen.), 21'	Report; Live TV: TV Tamazight 4	61' (o.g.) Amrane	Stadium: Lahoua Smaïl Stadium; Referee: Oukil, Serradj, Benali

9 April 2016 Round 25	RC Arbaâ	3–1	MC Alger	Larbaâ
16:00	Taib 5'; Yettou 7'; Guessan 63'	Report; Live TV: None	14' Gourmi	Stadium: Stade Ismaïl Makhlouf; Referee: Zouaoui, Kechida, Hakim

22 April 2016 Round 26	NA Hussein Dey	3–0	RC Arbaâ	Belouizdad
16:00	Gasmi 9', 76'; Drifel 77'	Report; Live TV: None		Stadium: Stade 20 Août 1955; Referee: Brahim, Boulekrinet, Badache

30 April 2016 Round 27	JS Kabylie	2–1	RC Arbaâ	Tizi Ouzou
16:00	Diawara 33'; Mebarki 55'	Report; Live TV: None	85' Kadri	Stadium: Stade 1er Novembre 1954; Referee: Benabdellah, Oudan, Benadda

13 May 2016 Round 28	RC Arbaâ	0–3	ES Sétif	Larbaâ
17:30		Report; Live TV: None	28', 89' Amokrane; 33' Kourbiaa	Stadium: Stade Ismaïl Makhlouf; Referee: Bendebiza, Messali, Belhocine

20 May 2016 Round 29	MC Oran	2–1	RC Arbaâ	Oran
17:30	Zubya 44', 49'	Report; Live TV: None	17' Bakir	Stadium: Stade Ahmed Zabana; Referee: Maâzi, Saâdi, Amri

27 May 2016 Round 30	RC Arbaâ	1–2	CS Constantine	Larbaâ
17:30	Bakir 6'	Report; Live TV: None	89' Meghni; 90' Voavy	Stadium: Stade Ismaïl Makhlouf; Referee: Guettoum, Benaissa, Aouina

== Algerian Cup ==
19 December 2015 Round of 64	RC Arbaâ	2–1	ORBG Bousbaa	Larbaâ
14:15	Bousaïd 84'; Amara 90'	Report	29' Daseri	Stadium: Stade Ismaïl Makhlouf; Referee: Benchehida, Oukil, Larbaoui

9 January 2016 Round of 32	RC Arbaâ	1–0	USB Tissemsilt	Larbaâ
14:30	Guessan 60'	Report		Stadium: Stade Ismaïl Makhlouf; Referee: Bouzerar, Yahi et Messaoudi

20 February 2016 Round of 16	ES Sétif	2–1	RC Arbaâ	Sétif
16:00	Dagoulou 60'; Djahnit 65'	Report	28' Yachir	Stadium: Stade 8 Mai 1945; Referee: Houasnia, Gourari, Tazourt

== Squad information ==
=== Playing statistics ===
No.	Pos	Nat	Player	Total		Ligue 1		Algerian Cup	
No.	Pos	Nat	Player	Apps	Goals	Apps	Goals	Apps	Goals
Goalkeepers
	GK	(Algeria) ALG	Ahmed Walid Chouih	8	0	7	0	1	0
	GK	(Algeria) ALG	Abdennour Merzouki	9	0	9	0	0	0
	GK	(Algeria) ALG	Oussama Methazem	4	0	4	0	0	0
	GK	(Algeria) ALG	Gaya Merbah	13	0	11	0	2	0
Defenders
	DF	(Algeria) ALG	Mohammed Ilyas Cherchar	23	0	22	0	1	0
	DF	(Algeria) ALG	Yannis Takerboucht	6	0	6	0	0	0
	DF	(Algeria) ALG	Nasreddine Zaâlani	23	1	22	1	1	0
	DF	(Algeria) ALG	Hamza Nouikes	17	0	15	0	2	0
	DF	(Algeria) ALG	Merouan Gheroui	8	0	7	0	1	0
	DF	(Algeria) ALG	Slimane Bouteldja	10	1	9	1	1	0
	DF	(Algeria) ALG	Ibrahim Zerrouki	2	0	1	0	1	0
Midfielders
	MF	(Algeria) ALG	Hocine Achiou	12	0	11	0	1	0
	MF	(Algeria) ALG	Abdelmalek Djeghbala	13	0	12	0	1	0
	MF	(Algeria) ALG	Rafik Boussaïd	5	1	4	0	1	1
	MF	(Algeria) ALG	Bilal Moumen	9	0	9	0	0	0
	MF	(Algeria) ALG	Abel Khaled	20	1	19	1	1	0
	MF	(Algeria) ALG	Salim Mahsas	24	4	21	4	3	0
	MF	(Algeria) ALG	Nassim Yettou	26	5	25	5	1	0
	MF	(Algeria) ALG	Hichem Bouyoucefi	10	0	8	0	2	0
	MF	(Algeria) ALG	Mohamed Islam Bakir	26	2	23	2	3	0
	MF	(Algeria) ALG	Atmane Amara	4	1	2	0	2	1
	MF	(Algeria) ALG	Amine Touil	2	0	2	0	0	0
Forwards
	FW	(Algeria) ALG	Ali Sami Yachir	12	2	11	1	1	1
	FW	(Algeria) ALG	Zinedine Bensalem	12	0	9	0	3	0
	FW	(Algeria) ALG	Jessim Mahaya	11	0	10	0	1	0
	FW	(Algeria) ALG	Mohamed Boussaïd	2	0	2	0	0	0
	FW	(Algeria) ALG	Abderrahmane Meziane	28	2	25	2	3	0
	FW	(Ivory Coast) CIV	Ghislain Guessan	24	10	22	9	2	1
	FW	(Algeria) ALG	Mohamed Taib	27	2	24	2	3	0
	FW	(Algeria) ALG	Omar Radjah	3	0	3	0	0	0
	FW	(Algeria) ALG	Mehdi Kadri	8	1	8	1	0	0
	FW	(Algeria) ALG	Karim Rebahi	6	0	4	0	2	0
	FW	(Algeria) ALG	Imad Eddine Belaziz	2	0	2	0	0	0
	FW	(Algeria) ALG	Younes Ismail	1	0	1	0	0	0
Players transferred out during the season
	DF	(Central African Republic) CAF	Salif Kéïta	4	0	3	0	1	0
	DF	(Algeria) ALG	Houari Ferhani	11	0	11	0	0	0
	MF	(Algeria) ALG	Farid Daoud	12	0	12	0	0	0
	MF	(Algeria) ALG	Hocine Harrouche	14	1	14	1	0	0

Last updated: 8 June 2019
Source: fr.soccerway.com
