= Larbaa =

Larbaa may refer to:

- Larbaa, Blida – a commune or municipality of Blida Province, Algeria
- Larbaâ District – a district in the Blida Province, Algeria
- Larbaa, Batna – a commune or municipality of Batna Province, Algeria
- Larbaa, Tissemsilt – a commune or municipality of Tissemsilt Province, Algeria
- Larbaâ Nath Irathen – a commune or municipality of Tizi Ouzou Province, Algeria
- Larbaâ Nath Irathen District – a district in the Tizi Ouzou Province, Algeria
