= 2022–23 RC Arbaâ season =

RC Arbaâ
2022–23 season
- President: Ahmed Boukhalfa
- Head coach: Faiçal Kebbiche
- Stadium: Ismaïl Makhlouf Stadium
- Ligue 1: 15th (relegated)
- Algerian Cup: Round of 32
- Top goalscorer: League: Mohamed Toumi Sief (13 goals); All: Mohamed Toumi Sief (14 goals)
- Biggest win: RC Arbaâ 5–1 USM Khenchela; RC Arbaâ 5–1 NC Magra
- Biggest defeat: JS Kabylie 4–0 RC Arbaâ; RC Arbaâ 0–4 CR Belouizdad

The 2022–23 season was RC Arbaâ's 5th season and the club's 2nd consecutive season in the top flight of Algerian football. In addition to the domestic league, RC Arbaâ participated in the Algerian Cup.

== Squad list ==
Players and squad numbers last updated on 5 February 2023.
Note: Flags indicate national team as has been defined under FIFA eligibility rules. Players may hold more than one non-FIFA nationality.

No.	Nat.	Position	Name	Date of birth (age)	Signed from
Goalkeepers
1	(Algeria)	GK	Ahmed Wahid Chouih	10 February 1982 (aged 40)	(Algeria) RC Kouba
16	(Algeria)	GK	Abdelmoumen Sifour	3 March 1998 (aged 24)	(Algeria) USM Alger
Defenders
2	(Algeria)	RB	Aymen Chaaraoui	26 July 1997 (aged 25)	(Algeria) Youth system
5	(Algeria)	CB	Ibrahim Saidani	9 March 1993 (aged 29)	(Algeria) MSP Batna
13	(Algeria)	CB	Haroune Benmenni	24 January 2000 (aged 22)	(Algeria) CR Belouizdad
17	(Algeria)	LB	Salaheddine Benlaribi	30 April 1995 (aged 27)	(Algeria) JS Djijel
19	(Algeria)	LB	Salim Brahmi	20 April 1994 (aged 28)	(Algeria) USM Blida
25	(Algeria)	RB	Islam Adel Aït Ali Yahia	13 April 1987 (aged 35)	(Algeria) RC Kouba
Midfielders
6	(Algeria)	MF	Abdelbasset Dahou	30 July 1995 (aged 27)	(Algeria) Youth system
7	(Algeria)	MF	Abderrezak Kibboua	2 December 1999 (aged 23)	(Algeria) Paradou AC
8	(Algeria)	MF	Mohamed Billal Rait	16 May 1986 (aged 36)	(Algeria) WA Boufarik
10	(Algeria)	MF	Aboubakr Kessili	26 December 1996 (aged 26)	(Algeria) RCB Oued Rhiou
12	(Algeria)	MF	Abderrazak Remili	8 May 2000 (aged 22)	(Algeria) Youth system
14	(Algeria)	MF	Zineddine Benboulaid	12 November 1997 (aged 25)	(Algeria) JS Tixeraine
15	(Algeria)	MF	Chams-Eddine Haddad	13 April 1994 (aged 28)	(Algeria) US Biskra
18	(Algeria)	MF	Mehdi Boubakour	26 June 1995 (aged 27)	(Algeria) SCM Oran
20	(Algeria)	MF	Kheireddine Toual	4 August 2001 (aged 21)	(Algeria) Youth system
23	(Algeria)	MF	Yacine Deghmani	29 July 1991 (aged 31)	(Algeria) US Beni Douala
27	(Algeria)	MF	Mohamed Taib	20 April 1994 (aged 28)	(Algeria) HB Chelghoum Laïd
Forwards
9	(Algeria)	FW	Aymen Amoura	4 January 1999 (aged 23)	(Algeria) WA Tlemcen
11	(Algeria)	FW	Ahmed Zaouche	27 May 1999 (aged 23)	(Algeria) MC El Eulma
21	(Algeria)	FW	Salah Eddine Akachat	9 February 2000 (aged 22)	(Algeria) USM Blida
22	(Algeria)	FW	Mohamed Toumi Sief	7 September 1994 (aged 28)	(Algeria) US Biskra
26	(Algeria)	FW	Lyes Draoui	28 September 1997 (aged 25)	(Algeria) NRB Beni Ouelbane
47	(Algeria)	FW	Islam Ansal	10 January 2001 (aged 21)	(Algeria) CA Bordj Bou Arréridj

== Transfers ==
=== In ===
==== Summer ====
Date	Pos	Player	From club	Transfer fee	Source
14 July 2022	FW	(Algeria) Ahmed Zaouche	MC El Eulma	Free transfer	
20 July 2022	FW	(Algeria) Islam Ansal	CA Bordj Bou Arréridj	Free transfer	
30 July 2022	MF	(Algeria) Abderrezak Kibboua	Paradou AC	Free transfer	
22 August 2022	FW	(Algeria) Aymen Amoura	WA Tlemcen	Free transfer	

=== Out ===
==== Summer ====
Date	Pos	Player	To club	Transfer fee	Source
16 June 2022	FW	(Algeria) Abdelmalek Oukil	MC Alger	Free transfer	
20 August 2022	CB	(Algeria) Idir Mokeddem	JS Saoura	Free transfer	
20 August 2022	FW	(Algeria) Mohamed Amine Bouziane	(Tunisia) US Monastir	Free transfer	

== Competitions ==
=== Overview ===
Competition	Record								Started round	Final position / round	First match	Last match
Competition	G	W	D	L	GF	GA	GD	Win %	Started round	Final position / round	First match	Last match
Ligue 1	30	10	6	14	39	43	−4	33.33	—N/a	15th	26 August 2022	15 July 2023
Algerian Cup	2	1	0	1	5	2	+3	50.00	Round of 64	Round of 32	25 November 2022	17 December 2022
Total	32	11	6	15	44	45	−1	34.38				

Updated to match played 15 July 2023
Source: Competitions

=== Ligue 1 ===
==== League table ====
Pos	Team	Pld	W	D	L	GF	GA	GD	Pts	Qualification or relegation
12	US Biskra	30	10	10	10	30	29	+1	40	
13	NC Magra	30	11	7	12	35	36	−1	40	
14	JS Kabylie	30	10	9	11	35	26	+9	39	
15	RC Arbaâ (R)	30	10	6	14	39	43	−4	36	Relegation to Ligue 2
16	HB Chelghoum Laïd (R)	30	0	4	26	11	76	−65	4	Relegation to Ligue 2

Updated to match(es) played on 15 July 2023. Source: the-sports.org
Rules for classification: 1) points; 2) head-to-head points; 3) head-to-head goal difference; 4) goal difference; 5) total goals; 6) fairplay ranking; 7) playoff.
(R) Relegated

==== Results summary ====
Overall								Home						Away					
Pld	W	D	L	GF	GA	GD	Pts	W	D	L	GF	GA	GD	W	D	L	GF	GA	GD
30	10	6	14	39	43	−4	36	9	2	4	31	20	+11	1	4	10	8	23	−15

Last updated: 15 July 2023.
Source: Competitive matches

==== Results by round ====
Round	1	2	3	4	5	6	7	8	9	10	11	12	13	14	15	16	17	18	19	20	21	22	23	24	25	26	27	28	29	30
Ground	H	A	H	A	H	H	A	H	A	H	A	H	A	H	A	A	H	A	H	A	A	H	A	H	A	H	A	H	A	H
Result	W	L	D	L	W	W	D	L	D	L	L	W	L	W	D	L	W	L	W	L	L	W	D	L	L	W	L	D	W	L
Position	3	6	7	10	6	4	6	8	8	11	13	9	11	10	12	12	10	13	9	11	13	10	11	12	14	14	15	15	15	15

Updated to match(es) played on 15 July 2023. Source: Competitive matches
A = Away; H = Home; W = Win; D = Draw; L = Loss

==== Matches ====
The league fixtures were announced on 19 July 2022.

26 August 2022 Round 1	RC Arbaâ	3–1	MC Oran	Larbaâ
17:00	Kessili 45+2'; Taib 62'; Toumi 84'	Report	Belaribi 18'	Stadium: Ismaïl Makhlouf Stadium; Referee: Anes Azrine

3 September 2022 Round 2	ES Sétif	1–0	RC Arbaâ	Sétif
20:00	Zamoum 43'	Report		Stadium: 8 May 1945 Stadium; Referee: Abdellah Benchehida

9 September 2022 Round 3	RC Arbaâ	0–0	MC Alger	Larbaâ
16:30		Report		Stadium: Ismaïl Makhlouf Stadium; Referee: Mehdi Abid Charef

16 September 2022 Round 4	JS Saoura	1–0	RC Arbaâ	Béchar
20:00	Mellal 90+1' (pen.)	Report		Stadium: 20 August 1955 Stadium; Referee: Abdemoumene Touabti

24 September 2022 Round 5	RC Arbaâ	2–0	US Biskra	Larbaâ
16:00	Taib 8'; Zaouche 10'	Report		Stadium: Ismaïl Makhlouf Stadium; Referee: Houssem Benyahia

30 September 2022 Round 6	RC Arbaâ	3–1	MC El Bayadh	Larbaâ
16:00	Saidani 12'; Taib 45+1'; Boubakour 55'	Report	Hitala 60'	Stadium: Ismaïl Makhlouf Stadium; Referee: Zine Abedine Dakhane

7 October 2022 Round 7	NC Magra	0–0	RC Arbaâ	Magra
15:30		Report		Stadium: Boucheligue Brothers Stadium; Referee: Abderrahmane Mohamed Belkbir

21 October 2022 Round 9	ASO Chlef	1–1	RC Arbaâ	Relizane
15:00	Aliane 53'	Report	Toumi 56'	Stadium: Tahar Zoughari Stadium; Referee: Najib Meziani

5 November 2022 Round 10	RC Arbaâ	1–2	CS Constantine	Larbaâ
15:00	Toumi 26'	Report	Koukpo 17'; Abdelhafid 31'	Stadium: Ismaïl Makhlouf Stadium; Referee: Mohamed Cherif Bouteraa

29 November 2022 Round 12	RC Arbaâ	5–1	USM Khenchela	Larbaâ
15:00	Brahmi 5'; Taib 18'; Toumi 46'; Saidani 64'; Deghmani 87'	Report	Berkani 65'	Stadium: Ismaïl Makhlouf Stadium; Referee: Ali Nader

7 December 2022 Round 13	JS Kabylie	4–0	RC Arbaâ	Tizi Ouzou
16:00	Guenina 16' (pen.), 43' (pen.); Boukhanchouche 58'; Nait Salem 90+4'	Report		Stadium: 1 November 1954 Stadium; Referee: Nadjib Meziani

11 December 2022 Round 14	RC Arbaâ	3–1	HB Chelghoum Laïd	Larbaâ
15:00	Taib 3', 25'; Amoura 44'	Report	Betrouni 36' (pen.)	Stadium: Ismaïl Makhlouf Stadium; Referee: Lamia Athmane

24 December 2022 Round 15	Paradou AC	1–1	RC Arbaâ	Belouizdad
14:30	Zerrouki 24' (pen.)	Report	Zaouche 84'	Stadium: 20 August 1955 Stadium; Referee: Radouane Alou

28 December 2022 Round 8	RC Arbaâ	0–4	CR Belouizdad	Larbaâ
14:30		Report	Wamba 8'; Selmi 17'; Bakir 22'; Bourdim 82'	Stadium: Ismaïl Makhlouf Stadium; Referee: Mehdi Abid Charef

8 February 2023 Round 11	USM Alger	3–0	RC Arbaâ	Dar El Beïda
15:00	Alilet 27'; Merili 54'; Mahious 66' (pen.)	Report		Stadium: Omar Benrabah Stadium; Referee: Abdelali Ibrir

12 February 2023 Round 16	MC Oran	2–1	RC Arbaâ	Oran
18:00	Ezzemani 19' (pen.); Dahar 64'	Report	Toumi 31'	Stadium: Ahmed Zabana Stadium; Referee: Rafik Aouina

19 February 2023 Round 17	RC Arbaâ	3–1	ES Sétif	Larbaâ
15:00	Zaouche 1'; Toumi 68'; Serradj 75'	Report	Chaabi 90+2'	Stadium: Ismaïl Makhlouf Stadium; Referee: Hamza Bouslimani

25 February 2023 Round 18	MC Alger	2–0	RC Arbaâ	Dar El Beïda
15:00	Haroune 56', 86'	Report		Stadium: Omar Benrabah Stadium; Referee: Youcef Gamouh

10 March 2023 Round 19	RC Arbaâ	2–0	JS Saoura	Larbaâ
15:00	Kessili 7', 73'	Report		Stadium: Ismaïl Makhlouf Stadium; Referee: Akram Mecharia

17 March 2023 Round 20	US Biskra	1–0	RC Arbaâ	Biskra
15:00	Boussalem 13'	Report		Stadium: 18 February Stadium; Referee: Mohamed Bouteraa

31 March 2023 Round 21	MC El Bayadh	3–1	RC Arbaâ	El Bayadh
15:45	Hitala 7'; Ghennam 61'; Belalem 90+4'	Report	Toumi 14' (pen.)	Stadium: Zakaria Medjdoub Stadium; Referee: Abdelali Ibrir

7 April 2023 Round 22	RC Arbaâ	5–1	NC Magra	Larbaâ
15:45	Toumi 23', 57' (pen.); Deghmani 30'; Benboulaid 52'; Aït Ali 79'	Report	Amrane 19'	Stadium: Ismaïl Makhlouf Stadium; Referee: Lotfi Bekouassa

17 May 2023 Round 23	CR Belouizdad	0–0	RC Arbaâ	Belouizdad
16:00		Report		Stadium: 20 August 1955 Stadium; Referee: Abdelmoumen Touabti

31 May 2023 Round 24	RC Arbaâ	0–3	ASO Chlef	Larbaâ
16:00		Report	Belarbi 52'; Addadi 62', 87'	Stadium: Ismaïl Makhlouf Stadium; Referee: Ali Nader

6 June 2023 Round 25	CS Constantine	2–0	RC Arbaâ	Constantine
16:30	Maâmeri 11', 28'	Report		Stadium: Ramadane Ben Abdelmalek Stadium; Referee: Nabil Boukhalfa

1 July 2023 Round 26	RC Arbaâ	2–1	USM Alger	Larbaâ
17:00	Toumi 45+3', 69' (pen.)	Report	Belaïd 66'	Stadium: Ismaïl Makhlouf Stadium; Referee: Abdelali Ibrir

4 July 2023 Round 27	USM Khenchela	2–1	RC Arbaâ	Khenchela
17:00	Baakoh 5'; Lamri 82'	Report	Toual 13'	Stadium: Amar Hamam Stadium; Referee: Akram Mechairia

7 July 2023 Round 28	RC Arbaâ	1–1	JS Kabylie	Larbaâ
17:15	Kessili 26'	Report	Mouaki 90+4' (pen.)	Stadium: Ismaïl Makhlouf Stadium; Referee: Lotfi Bekouassa

10 July 2023 Round 29	HB Chelghoum Laïd	0–3	RC Arbaâ	Chelghoum Laïd
17:15		Report	Benmenni 11'; Kessili 18'; Serradj 73'	Stadium: 11 December 1961 Stadium; Referee: Redouane Alou

15 July 2023 Round 30	RC Arbaâ	1–3	Paradou AC	Larbaâ
17:15	Toumi 19' (pen.)	Report	Zerrouki 61'; Soukkou 82'; Titraoui 90+1'	Stadium: Ismaïl Makhlouf Stadium; Referee: Houssam Benyahia

=== Algerian Cup ===
25 November 2022 Round of 64	RC Arbaâ	4–0	GC Aïn Sefra	Larbaâ
14:00	Ansal; Deghmani; Amoura; Zaouche	Report		Stadium: Ismaïl Makhlouf Stadium; Referee: Abdelghani Arbaoui
Note: Lineups for RC Arbaâ - Sifour, Chaaraoui, Benlaribi, Brahmi, Benmenni, Serradj, Kessili, Deghmani, Toual, Amoura, Ansal. (Haddad, '), (Zaouche, '), (Draoui, '), (Benboulaid, ')

17 December 2022 Round of 32	RC Arbaâ	1–2	ASO Chlef	Larbaâ
14:00	Toumi 51'	Report	Souibaâh 9' (pen.), 28'	Stadium: Ismaïl Makhlouf Stadium; Referee: Lyes Bekouassa
Note: Lineups for RC Arbaâ - Chouih, Chaaraoui, Benlaribi, Saidani, Benmenni, Rait, Taib, Deghmani, Zaouche, Amoura, Toumi.

== Squad information ==
=== Playing statistics ===
No.	Pos	Nat	Player	Total		Ligue 1		Algerian Cup	
No.	Pos	Nat	Player	Apps	Goals	Apps	Goals	Apps	Goals
Goalkeepers
1	GK	(Algeria) ALG	Ahmed Wahid Chouih	7	0	6	0	1	0
16	GK	(Algeria) ALG	Abdelmoumen Sifour	25	0	24	0	1	0
Defenders
2	DF	(Algeria) ALG	Aymen Chaaraoui	24	0	22	0	2	0
5	DF	(Algeria) ALG	Ibrahim Saidani	27	2	26	2	1	0
13	DF	(Algeria) ALG	Haroune Benmenni	20	1	18	1	2	0
17	DF	(Algeria) ALG	Salaheddine Benlaribi	19	0	17	0	2	0
19	DF	(Algeria) ALG	Salim Brahimi	26	1	25	1	1	0
25	DF	(Algeria) ALG	Islam Adel Aït Ali Yahia	26	1	26	1	0	0
Midfielders
6	MF	(Algeria) ALG	Abdelbasset Dahou	2	0	2	0	0	0
7	MF	(Algeria) ALG	Abderrezak Kibboua	8	0	8	0	0	0
8	MF	(Algeria) ALG	Mohamed Billal Rait	25	0	24	0	1	0
10	MF	(Algeria) ALG	Aboubakr Kessili	25	5	24	5	1	0
12	MF	(Algeria) ALG	Abderrazak Remili	0	0	0	0	0	0
14	MF	(Algeria) ALG	Zineddine Benboulaid	10	1	9	1	1	0
15	MF	(Algeria) ALG	Chams-Eddine Haddad	5	0	4	0	1	0
18	MF	(Algeria) ALG	Mehdi Boubakour	8	0	7	0	1	0
20	MF	(Algeria) ALG	Kheireddine Toual	19	1	18	1	1	0
23	MF	(Algeria) ALG	Yacine Deghmani	29	3	27	2	2	1
27	MF	(Algeria) ALG	Mohamed Taib	26	6	25	6	1	0
85	MF	(Algeria) ALG	Fouad Serradj	17	2	16	2	1	0
Forwards
9	FW	(Algeria) ALG	Aymen Amoura	16	2	14	1	2	1
11	FW	(Algeria) ALG	Ahmed Zaouche	28	4	26	3	2	1
21	FW	(Algeria) ALG	Salah Eddine Akachat	0	0	0	0	0	0
22	FW	(Algeria) ALG	Mohamed Toumi Sief	30	14	29	13	1	1
26	FW	(Algeria) ALG	Lyes Draoui	7	0	6	0	1	0
47	FW	(Algeria) ALG	Islam Ansal	6	1	5	0	1	1
Players transferred out during the season

Last updated: 15 July 2023
Source: soccerway.com

=== Goalscorers ===
As of 15 July 2023

Includes all competitive matches. The list is sorted alphabetically by surname when total goals are equal.

No.	Nat.	Player	Pos.	L 1	AC	TOTAL
22	(Algeria)	Mohamed Toumi Sief	FW	13	1	14
27	(Algeria)	Mohamed Taib	MF	5	0	5
10	(Algeria)	Aboubakr Kessili	MF	5	0	5
11	(Algeria)	Ahmed Zaouche	FW	3	1	4
23	(Algeria)	Yacine Deghmani	MF	2	1	3
5	(Algeria)	Ibrahim Saidani	DF	2	0	2
9	(Algeria)	Aymen Amoura	FW	1	1	2
85	(Algeria)	Fouad Serradj	MF	2	0	2
18	(Algeria)	Mehdi Boubakour	MF	1	0	1
47	(Algeria)	Islam Ansal	FW	0	1	1
19	(Algeria)	Salim Brahmi	DF	1	0	1
14	(Algeria)	Zineddine Benboulaid	MF	1	0	1
25	(Algeria)	Islam Adel Aït Ali Yahia	MF	1	0	1
20	(Algeria)	Kheireddine Toual	MF	1	0	1
19	(Algeria)	Haroune Benmenni	DF	1	0	1
Own Goals				0	0	0
Totals				39	5	44
