= 2021–22 RC Arbaâ season =

RC Arbaâ
2021–22 season
- Head coach: Abdelghani Boufennara (until 4 January 2022); Faiçal Kebbiche (c) (from 4 January 2022)
- Stadium: Ismaïl Makhlouf Stadium
- Ligue 1: 14th
- Top goalscorer: League: Mehdi Boubakour (10 goals); All: Mehdi Boubakour (10 goals)

In the 2021–22 season, RC Arbaâ competed in the Ligue 1 for the 4th season and the Algerian Cup, On July 18, 2021, RC Arbaâ was promoted to the Algerian Ligue Professionnelle 1 after five seasons of absence.

== Squad list ==
Players and squad numbers last updated on 20 October 2021.
Note: Flags indicate national team as has been defined under FIFA eligibility rules. Players may hold more than one non-FIFA nationality.

No.	Nat.	Position	Name	Date of birth (age)	Signed from
Goalkeepers
1	(Algeria)	GK	Ahmed Walid Chouih	10 February 1982 (aged 39)	(Algeria) RC Kouba
16	(Algeria)	GK	Zinedine Abassi	28 February 1999 (aged 22)	(Algeria) USM Alger
27	(Algeria)	GK	Abdelmoumen Sifour	3 March 1998 (aged 23)	(Algeria) USM Alger
Defenders
2	(Algeria)	RB	Aymen Chaaraoui	26 July 1997 (aged 24)	(Algeria) Youth system
4	(Algeria)	CB	Idir Mokeddem	5 June 1994 (aged 27)	(Algeria) CS Constantine
5	(Algeria)	CB	Ibrahim Saidani	9 March 1993 (aged 28)	(Algeria) MSP Batna
17	(Algeria)	LB	Salaheddine Benlaribi	30 April 1995 (aged 25)	(Algeria) JS Djijel
19	(Algeria)	LB	Salim Brahmi	20 April 1994 (aged 26)	(Algeria) USM Blida
21	(Algeria)	CB	Messaoud Doumi	8 February 1985 (aged 35)	(Algeria) WA Boufarik
Midfielders
6	(Algeria)	MF	Abdelbasset Dahou	30 July 1995 (aged 26)	(Algeria) Youth system
8	(Algeria)	MF	Mohamed Billal Rait	16 May 1986 (aged 35)	(Algeria) WA Boufarik
10	(Algeria)	MF	Aboubakr Kessili	26 December 1996 (aged 25)	(Algeria) RCB Oued Rhiou
12	(Algeria)	MF	Abderrazak Remili	8 May 2000 (aged 21)	(Algeria) Youth system
14	(Algeria)	MF	Abdallah Mostfaoui	11 August 1999 (aged 22)	(Algeria) Youth system
15	(Algeria)	MF	Chams-Eddine Haddad	13 April 1994 (aged 27)	(Algeria) US Biskra
18	(Algeria)	MF	Mehdi Boubakour	26 June 1995 (aged 26)	(Algeria) SCM Oran
20	(Algeria)	MF	Mohamed Akram Belmessous	16 November 1999 (aged 22)	(Algeria) Youth system
23	(Algeria)	MF	Yacine Deghmani	29 July 1991 (aged 30)	(Algeria) US Beni Douala
25	(Algeria)	MF	Islam Adel Aït Ali Yahia	13 April 1987 (aged 34)	(Algeria) RC Kouba
Forwards
7	(Algeria)	FW	Sid Ali Kabri	16 December 1998 (aged 23)	(Algeria) NC Magra
9	(Algeria)	FW	Oussama Kismoun	19 February 1996 (aged 25)	(Algeria) Paradou AC
11	(Algeria)	FW	Abdelmalek Oukil	7 July 1996 (aged 25)	(Algeria) WA Tlemcen
13	(Algeria)	FW	Boumediene Freifer	November 15, 1998 (aged 23)	(Algeria) MC Oran
22	(Algeria)	FW	Mohamed Toumi Sief	7 September 1994 (aged 27)	(Algeria) US Biskra
24	(Algeria)	FW	Mohamed Amine Bouziane	5 February 1996 (aged 25)	(Algeria) NA Hussein Dey
26	(Algeria)	FW	Hocine Diafi	19 June 1995 (aged 26)	(Algeria) A Bou Saâda

== Competitions ==
=== Overview ===
Competition	Record								Started round	Final position / round	First match	Last match
Competition	G	W	D	L	GF	GA	GD	Win %	Started round	Final position / round	First match	Last match
Ligue 1	34	10	13	11	40	45	−5	29.41	—N/a	12th	23 October 2021	11 June 2022
Total	34	10	13	11	40	45	−5	29.41				

Updated to match played 11 June 2022
Source: Competitions

== League table ==
Pos	Team	Pld	W	D	L	GF	GA	GD	Pts	Qualification or relegation
12	HB Chelghoum Laïd	34	11	12	11	40	41	−1	45	
13	NC Magra	34	13	6	15	31	36	−5	45	
14	RC Arbaâ	34	10	13	11	40	45	−5	43	
15	Olympique de Médéa (R)	34	10	6	18	32	53	−21	36	Relegation to Algerian Ligue 2
16	NA Hussein Dey (R)	34	5	7	22	33	66	−33	22	Relegation to Algerian Ligue 2

Updated to match(es) played on 17 June 2022. Source: the-sports.org
Rules for classification: 1) points; 2) head-to-head points; 3) head-to-head goal difference; 4) goal difference; 5) total goals; 6) fairplay ranking; 7) playoff.
(R) Relegated

=== Results summary ===
Overall								Home						Away					
Pld	W	D	L	GF	GA	GD	Pts	W	D	L	GF	GA	GD	W	D	L	GF	GA	GD
34	10	13	11	40	45	−5	43	7	6	4	22	18	+4	3	7	7	18	27	−9

Last updated: 11 June 2022.
Source: Competitive matches

=== Results by round ===
Round	1	2	3	4	5	6	7	8	9	10	11	12	13	14	15	16	17	18	19	20	21	22	23	24	25	26	27	28	29	30	31	32	33	34
Ground	H	A	H	A	H	A	H	A	H	A	H	A	H	A	H	H	A	A	H	A	H	A	H	A	H	A	H	A	H	A	H	A	A	H
Result	L	L	D	D	D	D	L	W	D	L	L	W	W	L	W	W	D	L	W	D	D	L	D	D	D	L	W	D	W	L	W	W	D	L
Position	17	18	18	17	16	15	17	13	12	16	16	14	12	12	10	10	10	13	11	10	11	12	13	13	13	13	13	13	13	14	13	12	13	14

Updated to match(es) played on 11 June 2022. Source: Competitive matches
A = Away; H = Home; W = Win; D = Draw; L = Loss

=== Matches ===
The league fixtures were announced on 7 October 2021.

23 October 2021 Round 1	RC Arbaâ	0–5	US Biskra	Kouba
16:00		Report	Khoualed 2', 34'; Mokhtar 50', 76' (pen.); Djahnit 55'	Stadium: Stade Omar Benhaddad; Attendance: 0 (Note: The match was played behind closed doors due to the COVID-19 pandemic in Algeria.); Referee: Youcef Taieb Bouderbal

30 October 2021 Round 2	USM Alger	4–0	RC Arbaâ	Bologhine
15:00	Belkacemi 14'; Mahious 30' (pen.); Zouari 35'; Belaïd 42'	Report	Brahimi (yellow card) 29'; Yacoub (yellow card) 74'	Stadium: Omar Hamadi Stadium; Attendance: 0 Referee: Nadjib Meziani

7 November 2021 Round 3	RC Arbaâ	0–0	HB Chelghoum Laïd	Boufarik
15:00		Report		Stadium: Stade Mohamed Reggaz; Referee: Mahdi Dehina

19 November 2021 Round 4	JS Kabylie	1–1	RC Arbaâ	Tizi Ouzou
17:00	Doumbia 30'	Report	Kessili 81'	Stadium: Stade 1er Novembre 1954; Referee: Abdellah Benchehida

25 November 2021 Round 5	RC Arbaâ	0–0	ASO Chlef	Boufarik
14:30		Report		Stadium: Stade Mohamed Reggaz; Referee: Amine Hansal

4 December 2021 Round 6	MC Oran	1–1	RC Arbaâ	Oran
17:00	Djabout 83'	Report	Kismoun 79'	Stadium: Ahmed Zabana Stadium; Referee: Abdelali Ibrir

10 December 2021 Round 7	RC Arbaâ	1–2	CR Belouizdad	Boufarik
15:00	Kessili 15'	Report	Belkhiter 6'; Merzougui 90+5'	Stadium: Stade Mohamed Reggaz; Referee: Abdelmoumen Touabti

17 December 2021 Round 8	NC Magra	1–2	RC Arbaâ	Magra
15:00	Neche 29'	Report	Kismoun 64'; Haddad 77'	Stadium: Boucheligue Brothers Stadium; Referee: Mohamad Salah Dafri

24 December 2021 Round 9	RC Arbaâ	0–0	WA Tlemcen	Boufarik
15:00		Report		Stadium: Stade Mohamed Reggaz; Referee: Akram Mechairia

28 December 2021 Round 10	MC Alger	1–0	RC Arbaâ	Algiers
16:00	Frioui 32'	Report		Stadium: Stade du 5 Juillet; Attendance: 0 (close doors); Referee: Hadj Aissa Semache

2 January 2022 Round 11	RC Arbaâ	0–1	CS Constantine	Boufarik
14:00		Report	Benchaira 83'	Stadium: Stade Mohamed Reggaz; Referee: Ali Nader

7 January 2022 Round 12	Paradou AC	1–2	RC Arbaâ	Dar El Beïda
15:00	Benbouali 1'	Report	Frifer 56'; Kessili 90+3'	Stadium: Omar Benrabah Stadium; Attendance: 0 (close doors); Referee: Ahmed Benhamou

14 January 2022 Round 13	RC Arbaâ	4–2	Olympique de Médéa	Larbaâ
15:00	Deghmani 7'; Berkoun 17'; Toumi 85'; Boubakour 88'	Report	Messaoudène 26'; Baâli 82'	Stadium: Stade Ismaïl Makhlouf; Referee: Lotfi Bekouassa

21 January 2022 Round 14	ES Sétif	3–1	RC Arbaâ	Sétif
15:00	Ziti 24'; Bakrar 45+2'; Kendouci 70'	Report	Boubakour 49'	Stadium: Stade 8 Mai 1945; Attendance: 0 (close doors); Referee: Nadjib Meziani

25 January 2022 Round 15	RC Arbaâ	3–1	NA Hussein Dey	Larbaâ
14:00	Boubakour 18'; Oukil 21', 73' (pen.)	Report	Bouloudene 84'	Stadium: Ismaïl Makhlouf Stadium; Attendance: 0 (close doors); Referee: Riadh Ammar Khodja

29 January 2022 Round 16	RC Arbaâ	2–1	RC Relizane	Larbaâ
14:30	Saidani 45+5'; Oukil 66'	Report	Belalia 88'	Stadium: Ismaïl Makhlouf Stadium; Referee: Amine Hansal

5 February 2022 Round 17	JS Saoura	0–0	RC Arbaâ	Béchar
17:00		Report		Stadium: Stade 20 Août 1955; Referee: Ali Nader

25 February 2022 Round 18	US Biskra	1–0	RC Arbaâ	Biskra
14:30	Mokhtar 12'	Report		Stadium: 18 February Stadium; Referee: Mohamed Saidi

1 March 2022 Round 19	RC Arbaâ	2–0	USM Alger	Larbaâ
15:00	Oukil 42'; Benlaribi 50'	Report		Stadium: Ismaïl Makhlouf Stadium; Attendance: 0 (close doors); Referee: Houssam Benyahia

5 March 2022 Round 20	HB Chelghoum Laïd	1–1	RC Arbaâ	Chelghoum Laïd
14:30	Khaldi 57'	Report	Boubakour 67'	Stadium: 11 December 1961 Stadium; Referee: Bilal Bendjahene

12 March 2022 Round 21	RC Arbaâ	0–0	JS Kabylie	Larbaâ
14:30		Report		Stadium: Ismaïl Makhlouf Stadium; Referee: Lotfi Bekouassa

19 March 2022 Round 22	ASO Chlef	2–0	RC Arbaâ	Chlef
15:00	Alili 39' (pen.); Dahmani 63' (pen.)	Report		Stadium: Stade Mohamed Boumezrag; Referee: Youcef Taieb Bouderbal

26 March 2022 Round 23	RC Arbaâ	1–1	MC Oran	Larbaâ
14:00	Boubakour 52'	Report	Djabout 30' (pen.)	Stadium: Ismaïl Makhlouf Stadium; Referee: Nadjib Meziani

12 April 2022 Round 25	RC Arbaâ	1–1	NC Magra	Larbaâ
15:45	Deghmani 16' (pen.)	Report	Demane 84' (pen.)	Stadium: Ismaïl Makhlouf Stadium; Referee: Mohamed Ali Nader

16 April 2022 Round 26	WA Tlemcen	2–1	RC Arbaâ	Tlemcen
15:45	Bounoua 65', 70'	Report	Toumi 70'	Stadium: Colonel Lotfi Stadium; Referee: Abdelmoumen Touabti

23 April 2022 Round 27	RC Arbaâ	1–0	MC Alger	Larbaâ
15:45	Deghmani 90+2'	Report		Stadium: Ismaïl Makhlouf Stadium; Referee: Bilal Bendjahene

29 April 2022 Round 28	CS Constantine	1–1	RC Arbaâ	Constantine
16:45	Dib 42'	Report	Toumi Sief 2'	Stadium: Stade Ramdane Benabdelmalek; Referee: Mustapha Ghorbal

6 May 2022 Round 29	RC Arbaâ	3–1	Paradou AC	Larbaâ
16:00	Oukil 10', 73', 79'	Report	Bouzok 25' (pen.)	Stadium: Ismaïl Makhlouf Stadium; Referee: Malek Aït Ameur

10 May 2022 Round 24	CR Belouizdad	1–1	RC Arbaâ	Belouizdad
17:00	Bourdim 70'	Report	Saidani 50'	Stadium: Stade 20 Août 1955; Attendance: 0 (close doors); Referee: Abderrezzak Arab

14 May 2022 Round 30	Olympique de Médéa	4–3	RC Arbaâ	Médéa
17:00	Gagaa 31' (pen.); Baâli 39', 90+2'; Belouchat 88'	Report	Bouziane 50'; Boubakour 52'; Toumi Sief 79'	Stadium: Stade Imam Lyes; Referee: Lahlou Benbraham

22 May 2022 Round 31	RC Arbaâ	3–1	ES Sétif	Larbaâ
16:00	Bouziane 23'; Oukil 45+1'; Boubakour 90+4'	Report	Kendouci 67'	Stadium: Ismaïl Makhlouf Stadium; Referee: Youcef Taieb Bouderbal

27 May 2022 Round 32	NA Hussein Dey	0–1	RC Arbaâ	Belouizdad
17:45	Boubakour 56'	Report		Stadium: Stade 20 Août 1955; Attendance: 0 (close doors); Referee: Abdellah Benchehida

3 June 2022 Round 33	RC Relizane	3–3	RC Arbaâ	Relizane
16:45	Harrats 8'; Belalia 64', 82'	Report	Boubakour 24', 52'; Deghmani 45+3'	Stadium: Tahar Zoughari Stadium; Referee: Mohamed Salah Dafri

11 June 2022 Round 34	RC Arbaâ	1–2	JS Saoura	Larbaâ
17:45	Toumi Sief 63'	Report	Lahmeri 51'; Hamidi 68' (pen.)	Stadium: Ismaïl Makhlouf Stadium; Referee: Abdelmoumen Touabti

== Squad information ==
=== Playing statistics ===
No.	Pos	Nat	Player	Total		Ligue 1	
No.	Pos	Nat	Player	Apps	Goals	Apps	Goals
Goalkeepers
1	GK	(Algeria) ALG	Ahmed Walid Chouih	26	0	26	0
16	GK	(Algeria) ALG	Zinedine Abassi	1	0	1	0
27	GK	(Algeria) ALG	Abdelmoumen Sifour	7	0	7	0
	GK	(Algeria) ALG	Mohamed Attallah	2	0	2	0
Defenders
2	DF	(Algeria) ALG	Aymen Chaaraoui	13	0	13	0
4	DF	(Algeria) ALG	Idir Mokeddem	28	0	28	0
5	DF	(Algeria) ALG	Ibrahim Saidani	18	2	18	2
17	DF	(Algeria) ALG	Salaheddine Benlaribi	28	1	28	1
19	DF	(Algeria) ALG	Salim Brahimi	4	0	4	0
21	DF	(Algeria) ALG	Messaoud Doumi	2	0	2	0
25	DF	(Algeria) ALG	Islam Adel Aït Ali Yahia	30	0	30	0
	DF	(Algeria) ALG	Walid Amiar	2	0	2	0
	DF	(Algeria) ALG	Abdelatif Taoualit	2	0	2	0
	DF	(Algeria) ALG	Hamza Yacoub	2	0	2	0
Midfielders
6	MF	(Algeria) ALG	Abdelbasset Dahou	0	0	0	0
8	MF	(Algeria) ALG	Mohamed Billal Rait	24	0	24	0
10	MF	(Algeria) ALG	Aboubakr Kessili	19	3	19	3
12	MF	(Algeria) ALG	Abderrazak Remili	0	0	0	0
14	MF	(Algeria) ALG	Abdallah Mostfaoui	1	0	1	0
15	MF	(Algeria) ALG	Chams-Eddine Haddad	14	1	14	1
18	MF	(Algeria) ALG	Mehdi Boubakour	26	10	26	10
19	DF	(Algeria) ALG	Salim Brahmi	23	0	23	0
20	MF	(Algeria) ALG	Mohamed Akram Belmessous	1	0	1	0
23	MF	(Algeria) ALG	Yacine Deghmani	26	4	26	4
	MF	(Algeria) ALG	Abderrahmane Berkoun	28	1	28	1
	MF	(Algeria) ALG	Ahmed Ouail Hamed	2	0	2	0
	MF	(Algeria) ALG	Malik Belkacem Hanine	2	0	2	0
	MF	(Algeria) ALG	Mohamed Yahya	1	0	1	0
	MF	(Algeria) ALG	Ameur Remita	2	0	2	0
	MF	(Algeria) ALG	Fouad Serradj	16	0	16	0
Forwards
7	FW	(Algeria) ALG	Sid Ali Kabri	7	0	7	0
9	FW	(Algeria) ALG	Oussama Kismoun	14	2	14	2
11	FW	(Algeria) ALG	Abdelmalek Oukil	30	8	30	8
22	FW	(Algeria) ALG	Mohamed Toumi Sief	24	5	24	5
24	FW	(Algeria) ALG	Mohamed Amine Bouziane	30	2	30	2
26	FW	(Algeria) ALG	Hocine Diafi	7	0	7	0
Players transferred out during the season
13	FW	(Algeria) ALG	Boumediene Freifer	8	1	8	1

Last updated: 11 June 2022
Source: soccerway.com

=== Goalscorers ===
As of 11 June 2022

Includes all competitive matches. The list is sorted alphabetically by surname when total goals are equal.

No.	Nat.	Player	Pos.	L 1	TOTAL
18	(Algeria)	Mehdi Boubakour	MF	10	10
11	(Algeria)	Abdelmalek Oukil	FW	8	8
22	(Algeria)	Mohamed Toumi Sief	FW	5	5
23	(Algeria)	Yacine Deghmani	MF	4	4
10	(Algeria)	Aboubakr Kessili	MF	3	3
24	(Algeria)	Mohamed Amine Bouziane	FW	2	2
9	(Algeria)	Oussama Kismoun	FW	2	2
5	(Algeria)	Ibrahim Saidani	DF	2	2
17	(Algeria)	Salaheddine Benlaribi	DF	1	1
15	(Algeria)	Chams-Eddine Haddad	MF	1	1
49	(Algeria)	Abderrahmane Berkoune	MF	1	1
13	(Algeria)	Boumediene Freifer	FW	1	1
Own Goals				0	0
Totals				40	40

== Transfers ==
=== In ===
Date	Pos	Player	From club	Transfer fee	Source
3 October 2021	FW	(Algeria) Abdelmalek Oukil	JS Kabylie	Free transfer	
11 October 2021	MF	(Algeria) Chams-Eddine Haddad	US Biskra	Free transfer	
20 October 2021	MF	(Algeria) Mohamed Amine Bouziane	NA Hussein Dey	Free transfer	
20 October 2021	FW	(Algeria) Oussama Kismoun	Paradou AC	Free transfer	
20 October 2021	FW	(Algeria) Seif Zine Toumi	US Biskra	Free transfer	

=== Out ===
Date	Pos	Player	To club	Transfer fee	Source
13 August 2021	LB	(Algeria) Younes Ouasiaa	ES Sétif	Free transfer	
15 August 2021	FW	(Algeria) Abdelmalek Oukil	JS Kabylie	Free transfer	
