= 2011–12 Algerian U21 Cup =

The 2011–12 Algerian U21 Cup was the first edition of the Algerian U21 Cup. JSM Béjaïa won the competition by beating ASO Chlef 2-0 in the final.

== Semi-finals ==
Tie no	Team 1	Score	Team 2
1	ASO Chlef	2–1	USM Blida
2	JSM Béjaïa	2-1	USM Alger

=== Matches ===
April 10, 2012

JSM Béjaïa	2 – 1	USM Alger
Ziane (?); Boulaïnceur 62'	Report	Yettou 27'

Stade Zéralda, Tizi Ouzou

April 10, 2012

ASO Chlef	2 – 1	USM Blida
	Report

Aïn Defla

== Final ==
Team 1	Score	Team 2
JSM Béjaïa	2–0	ASO Chlef

=== Match details ===
April 24, 2012
16:00

JSM Béjaïa	2 – 0	ASO Chlef
Aït Fergane 52'; Zeghli 88'	Report

Stade Zéralda, Zéralda
