= Ghislain Guessan =

Ivorian professional footballer (born 1992)

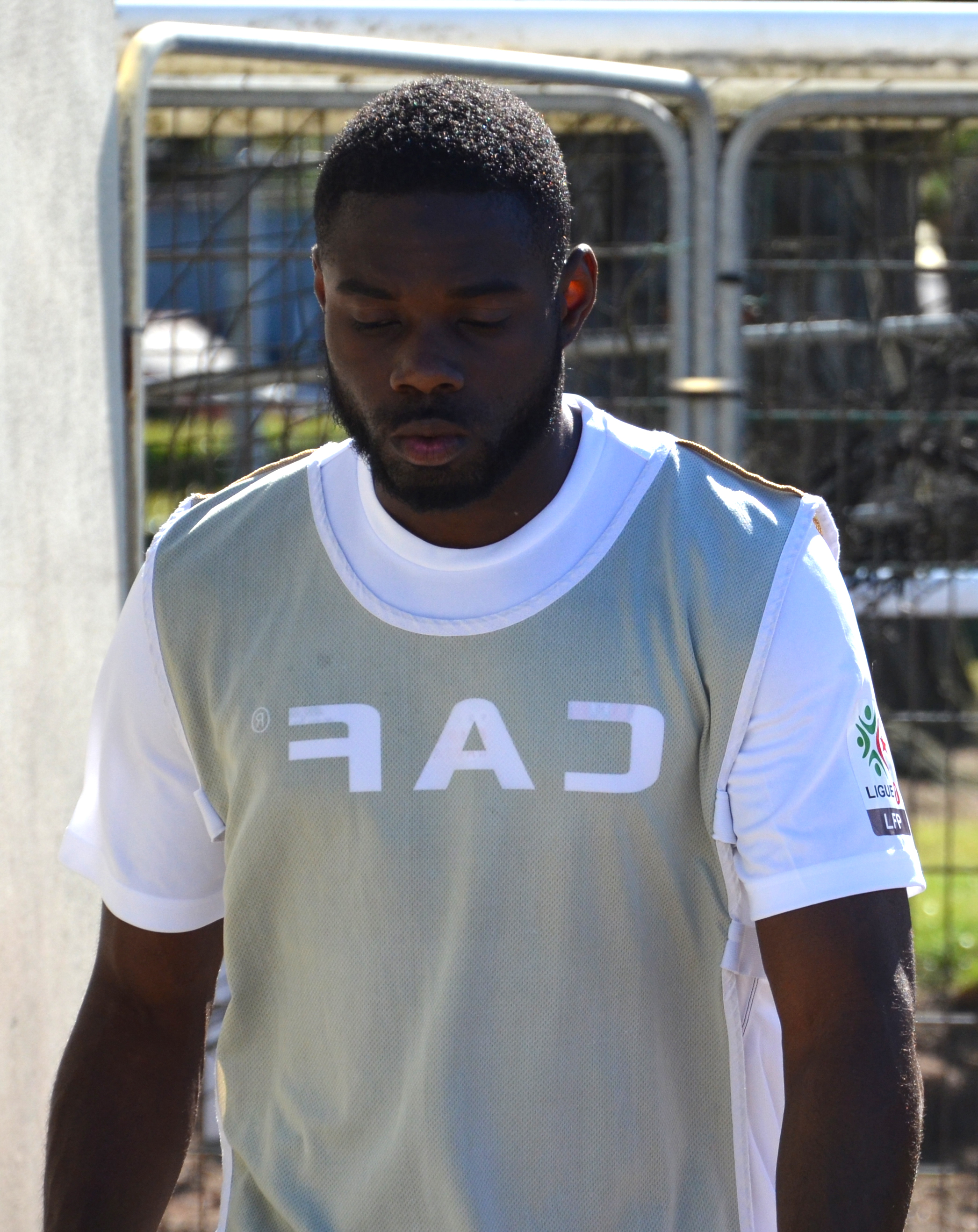

Personal information
- Date of birth: 15 September 1992 (age 34)
- Place of birth: Paris, France
- Height: 1.88 m (6 ft 2 in)
- Position: Forward

Team information
- Current team: Al-Minaa

Youth career
- 2010–2011: Nantes
- 2011–2012: Padova
- 2012–2013: Tours

Senior career*
Years	Team	Apps	(Gls)
2014–2017	RC Arbaâ	34	(10)
2016–2017	→ USM Alger (loan)	23	(5)
2017	Viking	3	(1)
2018–2019	Concordia Chiajna	23	(3)
2019	CA Bordj Bou Arréridj	5	(1)
2021	Perak FC	2	(0)
2023	Al-Minaa	0	(0)

International career
2011	Ivory Coast U20	1	(0)
- * Club domestic league appearances and goals as of February 6, 2023

Ghislain Guessan (born 15 September 1992) is an Ivorian professional footballer who plays as a forward for Al-Minaa in Iraqi First Division League.

== Club career ==
=== RC Arbaâ ===
Guessan joined RC Arbaâ in 2014 on a three-year contract. In his first season he played 12 games and scored a single goal against JS Saoura in a 2–1 win and reached the cup final but did not participate. The following season he played 24 matches and scored 10 goals. His first goal of the season was in a draw against JS Saoura and the last goal in a 3–1 win against MC Alger. Guessan left the club despite having a year left on his contract because of the club's relegation to the second division which forbids to bring in foreign players.

=== USM Alger ===
After two seasons with RC Arbaâ, Guessan joined to USM Alger, on a one-year contract. He joined on loan. His first goal with his new team was against the RC Relizane in a 6–0 win. after the piece won the first title in its history by winning the Super Cup against rivals MC Alger where he participated for 86 minutes. He then scored in the Algiers Derby against the same team, but USM Alger was defeated 2–1. The following week against JS Kabylie he scored another goal, after that missed scoring for three consecutive games until the derby against NA Hussein Dey where he scored two. He helped the team advance to the next round of the Algerian Cup scoring his sixth goal of the season against NT Souf. In the second half of the season, Guessan was unable to score a goal in 10 league games and in three Champions League matches. He officially left the club with 29 matches and 6 goals.

=== Viking ===
Guessan had a short stint with Norwegian club Viking in 2017. He went on trial with Scottish Premiership club Hearts in February 2018, but was not offered a contract.

In July 2019, Guessan joined Algerian Ligue Professionnelle 1 club CA Bordj Bou Arréridj.

== International career ==
Guessan represented the Ivory Coast U20s at the 2011 Toulon Tournament.

== Career statistics ==
=== Club ===
As of 30 September 2018

Club	Season	League			Cup		Continental		Other		Total	
Club	Season	Division	Apps	Goals	Apps	Goals	Apps	Goals	Apps	Goals	Apps	Goals
RC Arbaâ	2014–15	Ligue Professionnelle 1	12	1	0	0	—		—		12	1
RC Arbaâ	2015–16	Ligue Professionnelle 1	22	9	2	1	—		—		24	10
RC Arbaâ	Total		34	10	2	1	—		—		36	11
USM Alger (loan)	2016–17	Ligue Professionnelle 1	23	5	2	1	3 (Note: All appearance(s) in CAF Champions League)	0	1 (Note: Appearance in Algerian Super Cup)	0	29	6
Viking	2017	Eliteserien	3	1	0	0	—		—		3	1
Concordia Chiajna	2018–19	Liga I	8	2	0	0	—		—		8	2
Career total			68	18	4	2	3	0	1	0	76	20

== Honours ==
USM Alger

- Algerian Super Cup: 2016
