= Algerian U21 Cup =

Algerian football competition

- Founded: 2011
- Region: Algeria
- Teams: 32
- Current champions: USM El Harrach (1st title)
- Most championships: MC Oran; USM El Harrach (2 titles each)
- 2020–21 Algerian U21 Cup

The Algerian U21 Cup is an Algerian football competition run by Algerian Football Federation for under-21 sides. The competition was launched in 2011 and is open exclusively to clubs playing in the top two divisions of Algerian football.

JSM Béjaïa won the inaugural edition of the competition by beating ASO Chlef 2–0 in the 2012 final.

== Results ==
Year	Winners	Score	Runners–up	Venue	Attendance
2012	JSM Béjaïa	2–0	ASO Chlef	Zéralda Stadium, Zéralda	
2013	USM El Harrach	2–2 (4–2 p)	ASO Chlef	20 August Stadium, Algiers	
2014	NA Hussein Dey	1–0	MC Oran	Dar El Beïda Stadium, Dar El Beïda, Algiers	
2015	MC Oran	1–0	USM El Harrach	Djilali Bounaâma Stadium, Boumerdès	
2016	JS Saoura	4–0	A Bou Saâda	Mustapha Tchaker Stadium, Blida	
2017	MC Oran	3–0	ASM Oran	Ahmed Zabana Stadium, Oran	
2018	USM Alger	1–1 (4–3 p)	Paradou AC	19 May Stadium, Annaba	
2019	USM El Harrach	0–0 (8–7 p)	RC Relizane	Mustapha Tchaker Stadium, Blida	

== Winners table ==
Club	Winners	Runners-up	Winning years	Runners-up years
MC Oran	2	1	2015, 2017	2014
USM El Harrach	2	1	2013, 2018	2015
JSM Béjaïa	1	0	2012	
NA Hussein Dey	1	0	2014	
JS Saoura	1	0	2016	
USM Alger	1	0		2018
