= Uriah Asante =

Ghanaian footballer (1992–2016)

Personal information
- Date of birth: 6 March 1992
- Place of birth: Accra, Ghana
- Date of death: 13 June 2016 (aged 24)
- Place of death: Accra, Ghana
- Height: 1.76 m (5 ft 9 1/2 in)
- Position: Attacking midfielder

Senior career*
Years	Team	Apps	(Gls)
- Pure Joy FC
- → Hearts of Oak (loan)
2011–2013	Étoile du Sahel	12	(2)
2013–2014	Astra Giurgiu	0	(0)
2014–2015	EGS Gafsa	20	(5)
- * Club domestic league appearances and goals

Uriah Asante (6 March 1992 – 13 June 2016) was a Ghanaian footballer who played as a midfielder.
