= Darko Janacković =

Serbian footballer and manager (born 1967)

Personal information
- Full name: Daniel Darko Janacković
- Date of birth: 11 May 1967 (age 59)
- Place of birth: Pirot, Yugoslavia
- Height: 1.86 m (6 ft 1 in)
- Position: Midfielder

Team information
- Current team: Real Sapphire (manager)

Youth career
- 1978–1980: Partizan
- 1980–1986: Dieppe

Senior career*
Years	Team	Apps	(Gls)
1986–1987	Radnički Pirot		
1987–1988	OFK Beograd		
1988–1990	Moreirense		
1990–1992	Beira-Mar		

Managerial career
- 2000–2001: Partizan U-19 (assistant)
- 2001–2002: OFK Beograd (U-18)
- 2002–2003: Radnički Pirot
- 2004–2005: Avion
- 2006–2007: Hajduk Kula
- 2007: Metz (scout)
- 2008: Sétif
- 2008: CS Constantine
- 2009: MO Constantine
- 2010–2011: Persib Bandung
- 2011–2012: East Riffa
- 2012–2013: Pelita Bandung Raya
- 2014–2015: RC Arbaâ
- 2016–2018: Sohar
- 2018-2019: Aïn M'lila
- 2021: Ljungskile
- 2022–2023: Znojmo
- 2024–2025: Real Sapphire
- 2025: Olympic Charleroi
- * Club domestic league appearances and goals

Daniel Darko Janacković (born 11 May 1967), commonly known as Darko Janacković, is a Serbian football manager and a former footballer.

== Playing career ==
Born and raised in Pirot, Yugoslavia, he began his footballing career in 1978 with Belgrade-based FK Partizan. In 1980, he moved to France and more accurately to Dieppe where he began playing for FC Dieppe.

=== Yugoslavia ===
He began his professional footballing career in the year 1986 with Yugoslav Premier League and his hometown based side FK Radnički Pirot. In 1987, he moved to Belgrade where he signed a one-year contract with another Yugoslav Premier League side OFK Beograd.

=== Portugal ===
He first moved out of Yugoslavia in 1988 to Portugal where he signed a two-year contract with Segunda Liga side Moreirense F.C. In 1990, he moved to the city of Aveiro where he had a two-year stint with Primeira Liga side S.C. Beira-Mar, thus ending his professional footballing career as the Serbian met with a car accident later.

== Managerial career ==
Darko holds the UEFA A Licence, the second highest football coaching qualification. He received the UEFA A Licence in 2009 from the Football Association of Serbia.

=== Yugoslavia ===
He began his managerial career in 2000 with the U-19 team of his former club, FK Partizan where he worked as an assistant to Serbian football manager, Zvonko Živković, helping his side clinch the trophy of the U-19 championship of Yugoslavia.

In 2001, he moved to Belgrade where he was appointed as the head coach of the U-18 team of his former club, OFK Beograd. He helped his side secure third position in the 2001–02 U-18 championship of Yugoslavia.

Later in 2002, he moved back to his hometown, Pirot, where he was appointed as the head coach of his former club and Yugoslav Second League side, FK Radnički Pirot. He helped his club qualify for the Quarter-finals stage of the Yugoslav Cup in 2002.

=== France ===
He first moved out of Yugoslavia as a football manager in 2004 to France and more accurately to Avion where he was appointed as the head coach of Championnat de France Amateur side, CS Avion.

=== Serbia ===
In 2006, he moved to Serbia where he signed a one-year contract to be appointed as the head coach of Meridian Prva Liga (now known as Serbian SuperLiga) side, FK Hajduk Kula.

=== Back to France ===
He moved back to France in 2007 and began working as a scout for Ligue 1 side, FC Metz.

=== Algeria ===
In 2008, he again moved out of Serbia and this time to North Africa and more accurately to Algeria where he was appointed as the head coach of Algerian club ES Sétif.

Later in 2008, he moved to Constantine where he was appointed as the head coach of Algeria's oldest football club, CS Constantine.

In January 2009, he began coaching another Constantine-based side, MO Constantine and helped them secure the 5th position in the championship.

He was also awarded the Best Manager of the Season award at the end of the 2008–09 season.

=== Indonesia ===
In 2010, he again moved out of Serbia and this time to Indonesia where he was appointed as the head coach of Indonesia Super League side, Persib Bandung on a one-year deal which was believed to be the most expensive deal of the season in Indonesia football.

=== Bahrain ===
He moved to the Middle East and more accurately to Bahrain in July 2011, where he was appointed as the head coach of Bahraini Premier League side, East Riffa Club he finished his contrat in June 2012.

=== Back to Indonesia ===
In July 2012, he moved back to Indonesia where he was appointed as the Technical director-and-manager of Indonesia Super League side, Persipasi Bandung Raya.

=== Back to Algeria ===
In 2014–2015, he moved back to Algeria and more accurately to Larbaâ where he began coaching Algerian Ligue Professionnelle 1 side, RC Arbaâ.

=== Oman ===
In January 2016, he again made a move to the Middle East and this time to Oman where on 23 January, he was appointed as the head coach of Sohar-based Oman Professional League side, Sohar SC for the remaining of the 2015–16 Oman Professional League season. In his successful start at the Sohar-based side, he helped them finish at the fourth position in the 2015–16 season and also helped them secure the runners-up position in the 2015–16 Oman Professional League Cup, which are the club's best ever performances in both the competitions, respectively. He finished his contract in June 2018 with success and satisfaction of his work during two years and half in Oman.

== Coaching courses ==
He has had the opportunity of participating in various coaching courses under top European managers like Arsène Wenger at Arsenal F.C. in August 2002, Raynald Denoueix at Real Sociedad in January 2003 and Vicente del Bosque at Real Madrid C.F. in February 2003.

== Achievements as manager ==
=== Honors ===
Partizan U-19 (Assistant manager)

- Yugoslav Championship U-19: 2000–01.
- Graduated Football Coach First Level,
- Best in the Promotion in 2002.
- 10 UEFA Cups games in 2006-2007.
- Best success in the history ever of the Hajduk fc.
- Winner of the Arabic Cup 2008 Entente de Setif.
- Best Coach in Algeria 2008-2009.
- First in the half saison 2008-2009.
- The most expensive Coach in the History of Indonesian Football 2010.
- Best Coach in Bahreïn 2011-2012.
- Final Cup in Algeria 2014–2015
- Sohar fc Oman Professional League Cup runners-up 2015-16
- Best Coach in Oman 2016.
