= Larbaâ District =

Coordinates: 36°38′03″N 5°09′36″E

Larbaâ District دائرة الأربعاء
- District
- Map of Algeria highlighting Blida Province
- Country: Algeria
- Province: Blida
- District seat: Larbaâ (Blida Province)

Population (1998)
  - Total: 60,583
- Time zone: UTC+01 (CET)
- Municipalities: 2

Larbaâ is a district in Blida Province, Algeria. It was named after its capital, Larbaâ.

== Municipalities ==
The district is further divided into 2 municipalities. One of them Souhane, is the least populated one in the country:

- Larbaâ
- Souhane
