= Moussa Coulibaly (footballer, born 1993) =

Malian footballer

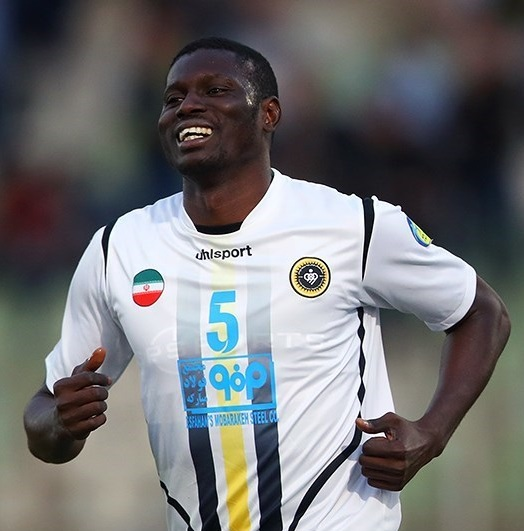
- Coulibaly with Sepahan in 2016

Personal information
- Full name: Moussa Coulbaly
- Date of birth: March 10, 1993 (age 33)
- Place of birth: Bamako, Mali
- Height: 1.90 m (6 ft 3 in)
- Position: Centre back

Team information
- Current team: Al-Khaldiya
- Number: 15

Youth career
- 2008–2010: Stade Malien

Senior career*
Years	Team	Apps	(Gls)
2009–2012	Stade Malien		
2012–2013	Djoliba	19	(2)
2013–2016	Esteghlal Khuzestan	67	(4)
2016–2017	Sepahan	28	(2)
2017–2018	Esteghlal Khuzestan	21	(1)
2018–2019	Naft Masjed Soleyman	25	(1)
2019–2025	Foolad	112	(13)
2025–	Al-Khaldiya	2	(0)

International career
2011	Mali U20	6	(0)
- * Club domestic league appearances and goals as of 10 July 2021

Moussa Coulibaly is a Malian football defender who currently plays for Bahraini football club Al-Khaldiya in the Bahraini Premier League.

== Club career ==
=== Stade Malien ===
Moussa Coulibaly joined the senior team in 2009. He played in 2011 CAF Champions League.

=== Djoliba ===
Moussa Coulibaly transferred to Djoliba in 2012. He played in 2013 CAF Champions League, scoring against Casa Sports. Moussa Coulibaly also played in the full season and scored two goals against CS Duguwolofila.

=== Esteghlal Khuzestan ===
Coulibaly joined Esteghlal Khuzestan in summer 2013 after being spotted by head coach Abdollah Veisi. He became a regular in the 2014–15 season, starting 23 games and scoring a goal. In the 2015–16 season he became one of Esteghlal Khuzestan's key players and was recognized as one of the best defenders in the league. In that season he helped the club to a historic first Persian Gulf Pro League championship. Due to his good performances throughout the season, Coulibaly was named in the Persian Gulf Pro League 2015–16 team of the season.

=== Sepahan ===
In May 2016 after his coach at Esteghlal Khuzestan, Abdollah Veisi, became coach of Sepahan, Coulibaly signed a two-year contract with the club. Coulibaly scored his first goal with Sepahan on 27 October 2016 in a 1–1 draw against Saipa. One month later on 24 November, he scored again in a 1–1 draw against Foolad.

=== Esteghlal Khuzestan ===
In May 2017 he returned to his previous club for a two-year contract.

== International career ==
Moussa Coulibaly played for Mali Under-20 at 2 competitions. He started his debut for Mali under-20 in 2011 FIFA U-20 World Cup against Colombia Under-20, the game ended as a 2–0 defeat for Mali. Moussa Coulibaly also played in 2011 African Youth Championship, Coulibaly played 4 games in that competition and Mali finished fourth.

== Club career statistics ==
As of 4 December 2020

Club	Division	Season	League		Hazfi Cup		Asia		Other		Total	
Club	Division	Season	Apps	Goals	Apps	Goals	Apps	Goals	Apps	Goals	Apps	Goals
Esteghlal; Khuzestan	Pro League	2013–14	16	2	1	0	–	–	0	0	17	2
Esteghlal; Khuzestan	Pro League	2014–15	23	1	2	0	–	–	0	0	25	1
Esteghlal; Khuzestan	Pro League	2015–16	28	1	2	0	–	–	0	0	30	1
Esteghlal; Khuzestan	Total		67	4	5	0	0	0	0	0	67	4
Sepahan	Persian Gulf Pro League	2016-17	28	2	1	0	–	–	0	0	29	2
Esteghlal Khuzestan	Persian Gulf Pro League	2017-18	21	1	2	0	–	–	0	0	23	1
Naft MS	Persian Gulf Pro League	2018-19	25	1	2	0	–	–	0	0	27	1
Foolad	Persian Gulf Pro League	2019-20	22	2	0	0	–	–	0	0	22	2
Foolad	Persian Gulf Pro League	2020-21	26	4	5	0	2	0	0	0	33	4
Foolad	Persian Gulf Pro League	2021-22	21	0	1	0	5	1	1	1	28	2
Foolad	Persian Gulf Pro League	2022-23	13	3	0	0	0	0	0	0	13	3
Foolad	Persian Gulf Pro League	2023-24	20	2	1	0	0	0	0	0	21	2
Foolad	Total		102	11	7	0	7	1	1	1	117	13
Career totals			243	19	17	0	7	1	1	1	268	21

== Honours ==
Stade Malien

- Malian Première Division: 2011–12 (Runners Up)
- CAF Confederation Cup: 2012 (Runners Up)

Esteghlal Khuzestan

- Persian Gulf Pro League: 2015–16

Foolad

- Hazfi Cup: 2020–21
- Iranian Super Cup: 2021

Individual

- Persian Gulf Pro League Team of the Year: 2015–16
