= Kamel Zeghli =

Algerian footballer (born 1993)

Personal information
- Full name: Kamel Zeghli
- Date of birth: 20 August 1993 (age 33)
- Place of birth: Béjaïa, Algeria
- Positions: Defender; forward

Team information
- Current team: JSM Béjaïa

Youth career
- –2012: JSM Béjaïa

Senior career*
| Years | Team | Apps | (Gls) |
| 2012–2013 | JSM Béjaïa | 9 | (1) |
| 2013–2014 | CS Constantine | – | (–) |
| 2014 | → JSM Béjaïa (loan) | 11 | (2) |
| 2014–2016 | JSM Béjaïa | – | (–) |
| 2016 | CR Belouizdad | 7 | (0) |
| 2017 | MC Oran | 1 | (0) |
| 2017–2019 | CA Batna | ? | (?) |
| 2019–2020 | ES Mostaganem | ? | (?) |
| 2020– | JSM Béjaïa | 0 | (0) |

International career
| 2012 | Algeria U20 | 9 | (1) |
- * Club domestic league appearances and goals as of 27 October 2020

Kamel Zeghli (born 20 August 1993) is an Algerian football player who plays for JSM Béjaïa.

== Club career ==
In the 2011–2012 season, Kamel was a member of JSM Béjaïa's Under-21 team that won the league-cup double, scoring a goal in the final of the 2011–12 Algerian U21 Cup against ASO Chlef.

On 22 December 2012, Zeghli made his senior debut for Béjaïa, coming as a half-time substitute in a league game against ASO Chlef.
