= Boubacar Bangoura =

Malian football player

Personal information
- Full name: Boubacar Bangoura
- Date of birth: 5 September 1990 (age 36)
- Place of birth: Bamako, Mali
- Height: 1.85 m (6 ft 1 in)
- Position: Forward

Team information
- Current team: Stade Malien

Youth career
- 2000–2008: Djoliba AC

Senior career*
Years	Team	Apps	(Gls)
2008–2012	Djoliba AC	-	(-)
2012–2014	JSM Béjaïa	18	(3)
2014–	Stade Malien		

International career^{‡}
2012–	Mali	1	(0)
- * Club domestic league appearances and goals as of 16:37, 17 January 2013 (UTC) ‡ National team caps and goals as of 25 November 2012

Boubacar Bangoura (born 5 September 1990 in Bamako, Mali) is a Malian football player who currently plays for Stade Malien. He formerly played for Algerian side JSM Béjaïa.

== Club career ==
Bangoura began his career at the age of 10 in the junior ranks of Djoliba AC.

=== JSM Béjaïa ===
On 4 December 2012, it was announced that Coulibaly would join JSM Béjaïa on a 3-year contract.
