= Ismaïl Makhlouf Stadium =

Football stadium in Larbaâ, Algeria

Coordinates: 36.5668°N 3.1490°E

- Interactive map of Ismaïl Makhlouf Stadium
- Full name: Ismaïl Makhlouf Stadium
- Location: Larbaâ, Algeria
- Owner: DJS Larbaâ
- Operator: RC Arbaâ
- Capacity: 5,000
- Surface: Artificial turf

Construction
- Renovated: 2013

Tenant
- RC Arbaâ

Ismaïl Makhlouf Stadium (Arabic: ملعب إسماعيل مخلوف) is a multi-use stadium in Larbaâ, Algeria. It is currently used mostly for football matches stadium is the home ground of RC Arbaâ. The stadium holds 7,000 spectators.

It bears the name of an Algerian revolutionary Ismail Makhlouf, former goalkeeper of the RCA and member of the FLN. In a match of his team at the Larbaâ, it was hunted and killed by the colonial army between halftime, he died by wearing the shirt of his club. Well and honor him, the main stadium of the city of Larbaâ bore his name since independence of Algeria.
