= Ahmed Cheheima =

Algerian footballer (born 1992)

Personal information
- Full name: Ahmed Cheheima
- Date of birth: April 8, 1992 (age 34)
- Place of birth: Sour El-Ghozlane, Algeria
- Position: Defender

Team information
- Current team: NRB Teleghma
- Number: 15

Youth career
- 2008–2011: Algerian FA Academy
- 2011–2012: USM Alger

Senior career*
Years	Team	Apps	(Gls)
2012–2014	JSM Béjaïa	35	(0)
2014–2015	RC Arbaâ	5	(0)
2015–2016	JSM Béjaïa	21	(0)
2016–2020	MC Saïda	70	(4)
2020–2021	USM Khenchela		
2021–2023	USM Annaba		
2023–	NRB Teleghma		

International career
2008–2009	Algeria U17	11	(2)
2010	Algeria U20	2	(1)
- * Club domestic league appearances and goals

Ahmed Cheheima (Arabic: أحمد شحيمة; born April 8, 1992) is an Algerian footballer who last played for NRB Teleghma.

Cheheima was part of the Algeria national under-17 football team that finished as runner-ups at the 2009 African U-17 Championship.
