= Larbaâ, Blida =

Larbaâ الأربعاء
- Commune and town
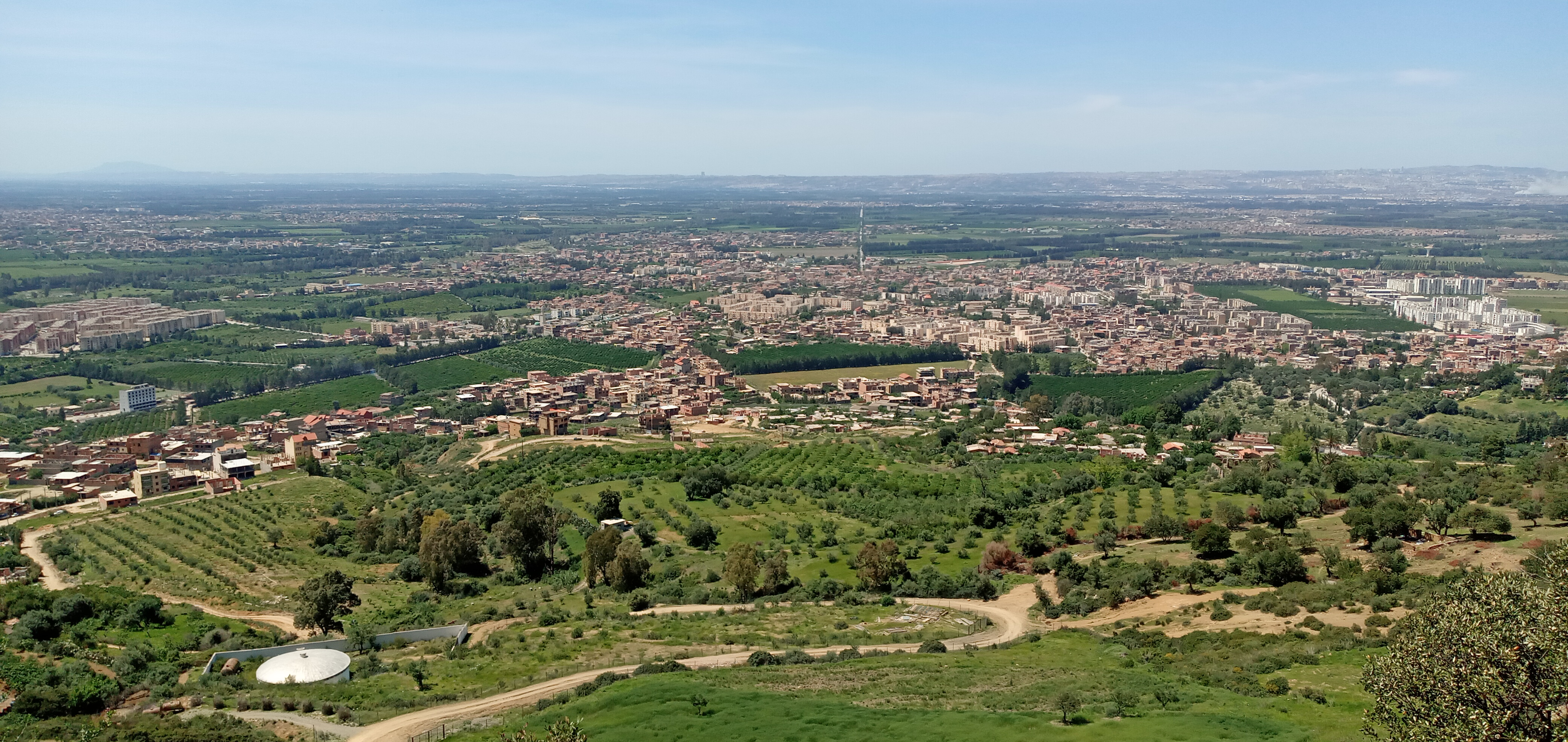
- Larbaâ

- Location within Algeria
- Coordinates: 36°33′55″N 3°9′14″E
- Country: Algeria
- Province: Blida Province
- District: Larbaâ District

Area
  - Total: 32.92 sq mi (85.25 km^{2})

Population (2008)
  - Total: 83,819
- Time zone: UTC+1 (CET)

Larbaâ (Arabic: الأربعاء al-Larbaʾāʾ) is a town in commune in Blida Province, Algeria. According to the 1998 census it has a population of 60,482.
