= List of Algerian football transfers summer 2018 =

This is a list of Algerian football transfers in the 2018 summer transfer window by club. Clubs in the 2018–19 Algerian Ligue Professionnelle 1 are included.

== Ligue Professionnelle 1 ==
=== AS Ain M'lila ===
Manager: (Algeria) Cherif Hadjar

In: Note: Flags indicate national team as defined under FIFA eligibility rules; some limited exceptions apply. Players may hold more than one non-FIFA nationality.

| No. | Pos. | Nation | Player |
|---|---|---|---|
| — | MF | ALG | Mokhtar Amir Lamhene (from (Algeria) CR Belouizdad) |
| — | DF | ALG | Abderrezak Bitam (from (Algeria) USM El Harrach) |
| — | GK | ALG | Billel Boufeneche (from (Algeria) DRB Tadjenanet) |
| — | MF | ALG | Mohamed Benchaira (from (Algeria) JSM Béjaïa) |
| — | MF | ALG | Brahim Si Ammar (from (Algeria) USM Blida) |
| — | DF | ALG | Djamel Ibouzidène (from (Algeria) ES Sétif) |
| — | DF | ALG | Hakim Khoudi (from (Algeria) CR Belouizdad) |
| — | MF | ALG | Houd Ahmed Taha Djoghma (from (Algeria) US Biskra) |

Out: Note: Flags indicate national team as defined under FIFA eligibility rules; some limited exceptions apply. Players may hold more than one non-FIFA nationality.

| No. | Pos. | Nation | Player |
|---|---|---|---|
| — | MF | ALG | Chouaib Debbih (to (Algeria) ES Sétif) |
| — | GK | ALG | Oussama Benbot (to (Algeria) JS Kabylie) |

=== CA Bordj Bou Arreridj ===
Manager: (Spain) Josep María Nogués

In: Note: Flags indicate national team as defined under FIFA eligibility rules; some limited exceptions apply. Players may hold more than one non-FIFA nationality.

| No. | Pos. | Nation | Player |
|---|---|---|---|
| — | DF | ALG | Ali Guitoune (from (Algeria) JS Kabylie) |
| — | MF | ALG | Abdelmalek Meftahi (from (Algeria) WA Boufarik) |
| — | MF | ALG | Mellel Benamar (from (Algeria) USM El Harrach) |
| — | MF | ALG | Mehdi Droueche (from (Algeria) Paradou AC) |
| — | DF | ALG | Mohamed Khoutir Ziti (from (Algeria) ES Sétif) |
| — | MF | ALG | Toufik Zerara (from (Algeria) CS Constantine) |
| — | DF | ALG | Faycal Kherifi (from (Algeria) US Biskra) |
| — | GK | ALG | Faouzi Chaouchi (from (Algeria) CR Belouizdad) |
| — | FW | MLI | Ismaila Diarra (from (Rwanda) Rayon Sports) |

Out: Note: Flags indicate national team as defined under FIFA eligibility rules; some limited exceptions apply. Players may hold more than one non-FIFA nationality.

| No. | Pos. | Nation | Player |
|---|---|---|---|
| — | MF | ALG | Djamel Rabti (to (Algeria) CR Belouizdad) |

=== CR Belouizdad ===
Manager: (Algeria) Tahar Chérif El-Ouazzani

In: Note: Flags indicate national team as defined under FIFA eligibility rules; some limited exceptions apply. Players may hold more than one non-FIFA nationality.

| No. | Pos. | Nation | Player |
|---|---|---|---|
| — | DF | ALG | Ryad Kenniche (from (Algeria) USM Alger) |
| — | MF | ALG | Nadir Chelbab (from (France) SA Thiers) |
| — | MF | ALG | Djamel Rabti (from (Algeria) CA Bordj Bou Arreridj) |
| — | MF | ALG | Adel Djerrar (from (Algeria) JS Kabylie) |
| — | DF | ALG | Chouaib Keddad (from (Algeria) ASO Chlef) |
| — | FW | ALG | Djamel Chettal (from (Algeria) USM Bel Abbès) |
| — | DF | ALG | Zine El Abidine Boulekhoua (from (Algeria) MC Alger) |
| — | FW | ALG | Abou Sofiane Balegh (from (Algeria) MC Alger) |
| — | GK | ALG | Faouzi Chaouchi (from (Algeria) MC Alger) |
| — | GK | ALG | Cédric Si Mohamed (from (Algeria) US Biskra) |
| — | MF | GUI | Mohamed Thiam (from (Algeria) JS Kabylie) |
| — | MF | ALG | Abdelaziz Kebbal (from (Algeria) CS Constantine) |

Out: Note: Flags indicate national team as defined under FIFA eligibility rules; some limited exceptions apply. Players may hold more than one non-FIFA nationality.

| No. | Pos. | Nation | Player |
|---|---|---|---|
| — | MF | ALG | Zakaria Draoui (to (Algeria) ES Sétif) |
| — | FW | ALG | Sid Ali Lakroum (to (Algeria) ES Sétif) |
| — | GK | ALG | Abdelkader Salhi (to (Algeria) JS Kabylie) |
| — | DF | ALG | Amir Belaïli (to (Algeria) JS Kabylie) |
| — | MF | ALG | Mokhtar Amir Lamhene (from (Algeria) AS Ain M'lila) |
| — | DF | ALG | Sofiane Bouchar (to (Algeria) MC Oran) |
| — | DF | ALG | Mohamed Namani (to (Saudi Arabia) Al-Fateh) |
| — | MF | ALG | Mohamed Adem Izghouti (to (Algeria) DRB Tadjenanet) |
| — | GK | ALG | Faouzi Chaouchi (to (Algeria) CA Bordj Bou Arreridj) |
| — | DF | ALG | Hakim Khoudi (to (Algeria) AS Ain M'lila) |

=== CS Constantine ===
Manager: (Algeria) Abdelkader Amrani

In: Note: Flags indicate national team as defined under FIFA eligibility rules; some limited exceptions apply. Players may hold more than one non-FIFA nationality.

| No. | Pos. | Nation | Player |
|---|---|---|---|
| — | DF | ALG | islam Chahrour (from (Algeria) Paradou AC) |
| — | MF | ALG | Kaddour Beldjilali (from (Algeria) USM Alger) |
| — | MF | ALG | Yacine Salhi (from (Algeria) MO Béjaïa) |
| — | FW | ALG | Mohamed Amine Belmokhtar (from (Algeria) DRB Tadjenanet) |
| — | FW | ALG | Adil Djabout (from (Algeria) JS Kabylie) |

Out: Note: Flags indicate national team as defined under FIFA eligibility rules; some limited exceptions apply. Players may hold more than one non-FIFA nationality.

| No. | Pos. | Nation | Player |
|---|---|---|---|
| — | MF | ALG | Merouane Dahar (to (Algeria) MO Béjaïa) |
| — | MF | ALG | Toufik Zerara (to (Algeria) CA Bordj Bou Arreridj) |
| — | FW | ALG | Karim Rachedi (to (Algeria) USM El Harrach) |
| — | MF | ALG | Yacine Bezzaz (to (Algeria) MC El Eulma) |
| — | FW | MLI | Moctar Cissé (to (Algeria) NA Hussein Dey) |
| — | MF | ALG | Abdelaziz Kebbal (to (Algeria) CR Belouizdad) |
| — | MF | ALG | El Hedi Belameiri (to (Cyprus) Alki Oroklini) |

=== DRB Tadjenanet ===
Manager:

In: Note: Flags indicate national team as defined under FIFA eligibility rules; some limited exceptions apply. Players may hold more than one non-FIFA nationality.

| No. | Pos. | Nation | Player |
|---|---|---|---|
| — | MF | ALG | Abdelaziz Amachi (from (Algeria) MC Alger) |
| — | MF | ALG | Mohamed Adem Izghouti (from (Algeria) CR Belouizdad) |
| — | DF | ALG | Mohamed Herida (from (Algeria) NA Hussein Dey) |
| — | MF | ALG | Oussama Aggar (from (Algeria) MO Béjaïa) |
| — | MF | NIG | Youssouf Aliou Oumarou (from (Morocco) MC Oujda) |

Out: Note: Flags indicate national team as defined under FIFA eligibility rules; some limited exceptions apply. Players may hold more than one non-FIFA nationality.

| No. | Pos. | Nation | Player |
|---|---|---|---|
| — | DF | ALG | Abderrahim Hamra (Loan return to (Algeria) USM Alger) |
| — | FW | ALG | Kaddour Cherif (Loan return to (Algeria) USM Alger) |
| — | FW | ALG | Mohamed Amine Belmokhtar (to (Algeria) CS Constantine) |
| — | FW | MLI | Dousse Kodjo (to (Algeria) MC Oran) |
| — | GK | ALG | Billel Boufeneche (to (Algeria) AS Ain M'lila) |
| — | MF | ALG | Abdellah Daouadji (to (Algeria) JSM Béjaïa) |

=== ES Sétif ===
Manager: (Morocco) Rachid Taoussi

In: Note: Flags indicate national team as defined under FIFA eligibility rules; some limited exceptions apply. Players may hold more than one non-FIFA nationality.

| No. | Pos. | Nation | Player |
|---|---|---|---|
| — | DF | ALG | Houari Ferhani (from (Algeria) JS Kabylie) |
| — | MF | ALG | Zakaria Draoui (from (Algeria) CR Belouizdad) |
| — | FW | ALG | Sid Ali Lakroum (from (Algeria) CR Belouizdad) |
| — | DF | ALG | Saâdi Radouani (from (Algeria) JS Kabylie) |
| — | MF | ALG | Chouaib Debbih (from (Algeria) AS Ain M'lila) |
| — | DF | ALG | Houssemeddine Guecha (from (Algeria) USM Blida) |
| — | FW | ALG | Habib Bouguelmouna (from (Algeria) USM Bel Abbès) |
| — | MF | ALG | Benamar Mellel (from (Algeria) USM El Harrach) |
| — | MF | ALG | Sabri Boumaiza (from (Algeria) RC Kouba) |
| — | GK | ALG | Abderrahmane Boultif (from (Algeria) JS Kabylie) |
| — | MF | ALG | Amir Karaoui (from (Algeria) MC Alger) |
| — | DF | CIV | Isla Daoudi Diomandé (from (France) SO Cholet) |
| — | FW | ALG | Youssef Laoufi (from (Algeria) MC El Eulma) |

Out: Note: Flags indicate national team as defined under FIFA eligibility rules; some limited exceptions apply. Players may hold more than one non-FIFA nationality.

| No. | Pos. | Nation | Player |
|---|---|---|---|
| — | MF | ALG | Zakaria Haddouche (to (Algeria) MC Alger) |
| — | MF | ALG | Hamza Aït Ouamar (to (Algeria) MC Oran) |
| — | MF | ALG | Sid Ahmed Aouedj (to (Algeria) JS Saoura) |
| — | FW | ALG | Abdelhakim Amokrane (to (Algeria) MO Béjaïa) |
| — | FW | ALG | Mourad Benayad (to (Algeria) USM Bel Abbès) |
| — | DF | ALG | Mohamed Khoutir Ziti (to (Algeria) CA Bordj Bou Arreridj) |
| — | DF | ALG | Djamel Ibouzidène (to (Algeria) AS Ain M'lila) |

=== JS Kabylie ===
Manager: (France) Franck Dumas

In: Note: Flags indicate national team as defined under FIFA eligibility rules; some limited exceptions apply. Players may hold more than one non-FIFA nationality.

| No. | Pos. | Nation | Player |
|---|---|---|---|
| — | MF | ALG | Tahar Benkhelifa (from (Algeria) Paradou AC) |
| — | DF | ALG | Badreddine Souyad (from (Algeria) RC Arbaâ) |
| — | GK | ALG | Abdelkader Salhi (from (Algeria) CR Belouizdad) |
| — | DF | ALG | Samy Slama (from (Norway) Drøbak-Frogn IL) |
| — | FW | ALG | Kacem Amaouche (from (France) Besançon Football) |
| — | GK | ALG | Oussama Benbot (from (Algeria) AS Ain M'lila) |
| — | DF | ALG | Amir Belaïli (from (Algeria) CR Belouizdad) |
| — | MF | ALG | Rezki Hamroune (from (France) AS Apollinaire) |
| — | MF | GUI | Mohamed Thiam (from (Guinea) AS Kaloum Star) |
| — | FW | NGA | Uche Nwofor (Unattached) |
| — | MF | ALG | Abdellah El Moudene (from (Algeria) MC Alger) |
| — | FW | BDI | Abdul Razak Fiston (from (Iraq) Al-Zawra'a SC) |

Out: Note: Flags indicate national team as defined under FIFA eligibility rules; some limited exceptions apply. Players may hold more than one non-FIFA nationality.

| No. | Pos. | Nation | Player |
|---|---|---|---|
| — | MF | ALG | Ziri Hammar (Loan return to (Algeria) USM Alger) |
| — | DF | ALG | Houari Ferhani (to (Algeria) ES Sétif) |
| — | DF | ALG | Saâdi Radouani (to (Algeria) ES Sétif) |
| — | MF | ALG | Malik Raiah (to (Algeria) NA Hussein Dey) |
| — | GK | ALG | Abderrahmane Boultif (to (Algeria) ES Sétif) |
| — | MF | ALG | Nassim Yettou (to (Algeria) MC Oran) |
| — | FW | ALG | Adil Djabout (to (Algeria) CS Constantine) |
| — | GK | ALG | Malik Asselah (to (Saudi Arabia) Al-Hazem) |
| — | FW | CMR | Steve Ekedi (Unattached) |
| — | DF | ALG | Ali Guitoune (to (Algeria) CA Bordj Bou Arreridj) |
| — | MF | ALG | Adel Djerrar (to (Algeria) CR Belouizdad) |
| — | MF | GUI | Mohamed Thiam (from (Algeria) CR Belouizdad) |
| — | FW | ALG | Nazim Si Salem (Unattached) |
| — | DF | ALG | Ramdane Ferguene (Unattached) |
| — | DF | ALG | Smail Meziane (Unattached) |
| — | DF | ALG | Makhlouf Naït Rabah (Unattached) |
| — | MF | ALG | Mohamed Amine Ouguenoune (Unattached) |
| — | FW | ALG | Ahmed Mesbahi (Unattached) |
| — | DF | ALG | Youcef Dahlal (Unattached) |

=== JS Saoura ===
Manager: (Algeria) Nabil Neghiz

In: Note: Flags indicate national team as defined under FIFA eligibility rules; some limited exceptions apply. Players may hold more than one non-FIFA nationality.

| No. | Pos. | Nation | Player |
|---|---|---|---|
| — | GK | ALG | Abderaouf Natèche (from (Algeria) MC Oran) |
| — | MF | ALG | Sid Ahmed Aouedj (from (Algeria) ES Sétif) |
| — | MF | ALG | Adel Bouchiba (from (Algeria) Olympique de Médéa) |
| — | FW | ALG | Mohamed Boulaouidet (from (Saudi Arabia) Ohod Club) |
| — | MF | ALG | Younes Koulkheir (from (Algeria) Olympique de Médéa) |
| — | MF | GUI | Seydouba Bissiri Camara (from (Guinea) AS Kaloum Star) |

Out: Note: Flags indicate national team as defined under FIFA eligibility rules; some limited exceptions apply. Players may hold more than one non-FIFA nationality.

| No. | Pos. | Nation | Player |
|---|---|---|---|
| — | MF | ALG | Abderrahmane Bourdim (to (Algeria) MC Alger) |

=== MC Alger ===
Manager: (France) Bernard Casoni

In: Note: Flags indicate national team as defined under FIFA eligibility rules; some limited exceptions apply. Players may hold more than one non-FIFA nationality.

| No. | Pos. | Nation | Player |
|---|---|---|---|
| — | MF | ALG | Zakaria Haddouche (from (Algeria) ES Sétif) |
| — | DF | ALG | Islam Arous (from (Algeria) Paradou AC) |
| — | FW | ALG | Mansour Benothmane (from (Tunisia) Club Africain) |
| — | MF | ALG | Abderrahmane Bourdim (from (Algeria) JS Saoura) |
| — | DF | ALG | Farès Hachi (from (South Africa) Mamelodi Sundowns) |
| — | MF | ALG | Oualid Mamoun (from (France) Angers) |

Out: Note: Flags indicate national team as defined under FIFA eligibility rules; some limited exceptions apply. Players may hold more than one non-FIFA nationality.

| No. | Pos. | Nation | Player |
|---|---|---|---|
| — | MF | ALG | Abdelaziz Amachi (to (Algeria) DRB Tadjenanet) |
| — | FW | ALG | Abou Sofiane Balegh (to (Algeria) CR Belouizdad) |
| — | GK | ALG | Faouzi Chaouchi (to (Algeria) CR Belouizdad) |
| — | MF | ALG | Abdellah El Moudene (to (Algeria) JS Kabylie) |
| — | DF | ALG | Zine El Abidine Boulekhoua (to (Algeria) CR Belouizdad) |
| — | MF | ALG | Amir Karaoui (to (Algeria) ES Sétif) |
| — | DF | ALG | Rachid Bouhenna (to (Scotland) Dundee United) |

=== MC Oran ===
Manager: (Morocco) Badou Zaki

In: Note: Flags indicate national team as defined under FIFA eligibility rules; some limited exceptions apply. Players may hold more than one non-FIFA nationality.

| No. | Pos. | Nation | Player |
|---|---|---|---|
| — | MF | ALG | Hamza Aït Ouamar (from (Algeria) ES Sétif) |
| — | DF | ALG | Brahim Boudebouda (from (Algeria) MC Alger) |
| — | GK | ALG | Sid Ahmed Rafik Mazouzi (from (Algeria) USM El Harrach) |
| — | MF | ALG | Bouazza Feham (from (Saudi Arabia) Al-Wehda) |
| — | DF | ALG | Mohamed Kennache (from (Algeria) JSM Skikda) |
| — | MF | ALG | Nassim Yettou (from (Algeria) JS Kabylie) |
| — | MF | ALG | Ziri Hammar (from (Algeria) USM Alger) |
| — | FW | MLI | Dousse Kodjo (loan from (Algeria) DRB Tadjenanet) |
| — | DF | ALG | Sofiane Bouchar (to (Algeria) CR Belouizdad) |

Out: Note: Flags indicate national team as defined under FIFA eligibility rules; some limited exceptions apply. Players may hold more than one non-FIFA nationality.

| No. | Pos. | Nation | Player |
|---|---|---|---|
| — | GK | ALG | Abderaouf Natèche (to (Algeria) JS Saoura) |
| — | MF | ALG | Omar Boudoumi (to (Algeria) MO Béjaïa) |
| — | FW | ALG | Mohamed Bentiba (to (Algeria) USM Alger) |
| — | MF | ALG | Mohamed El Amine Aouad (to (Algeria) USM El Harrach) |
| — | DF | ALG | Slimane Allali (to (Algeria) JSM Béjaïa) |

=== MO Béjaïa ===
Manager: (France) Alain Michel

In: Note: Flags indicate national team as defined under FIFA eligibility rules; some limited exceptions apply. Players may hold more than one non-FIFA nationality.

| No. | Pos. | Nation | Player |
|---|---|---|---|
| — | MF | ALG | Omar Boudoumi (from (Algeria) MC Oran) |
| — | FW | ALG | Abdelhakim Amokrane (from (Algeria) ES Sétif) |
| — | MF | ALG | Sofiane Aibout (from (Algeria) MC Saida) |
| — | MF | ALG | Merouane Dahar (from (Algeria) CS Constantine) |
| — | DF | ALG | Ilyes Bouheniche (from (Algeria) USM Blida) |
| — | FW | MLI | Malick Touré (from (Algeria) US Biskra) |
| — | MF | ALG | Reda Bellahcene (from (Algeria) USM Alger) |
| — | DF | ALG | Arslane Mazari (from (Algeria) USM El Harrach) |
| — | DF | ALG | Abdelhak Debbari (from (Algeria) USM El Harrach) |
| — | FW | ALG | Kamel Soltani (from (Algeria) ASO Chlef) |
| — | FW | MLI | Moussa Camara (from (Egypt) Ismaily SC) |
| — | GK | ALG | Athmane Toual (from (Algeria) USM Bel Abbès) |
| — | FW | ALG | Lounes Messaoudi (from (Algeria) SRB Tazmalt) |

Out: Note: Flags indicate national team as defined under FIFA eligibility rules; some limited exceptions apply. Players may hold more than one non-FIFA nationality.

| No. | Pos. | Nation | Player |
|---|---|---|---|
| — | MF | ALG | Yacine Salhi (to (Algeria) CS Constantine) |
| — | MF | ALG | Oussama Aggar (to (Algeria) DRB Tadjenanet) |

=== NA Hussein Dey ===
Manager: (Algeria) Billel Dziri

In: Note: Flags indicate national team as defined under FIFA eligibility rules; some limited exceptions apply. Players may hold more than one non-FIFA nationality.

| No. | Pos. | Nation | Player |
|---|---|---|---|
| — | MF | ALG | Mohamed Amine Tougaï (First Professional Contract U20) |
| — | DF | ALG | Zinedine Belaid (First Professional Contract U20) |
| — | MF | ALG | Malik Raiah (from (Algeria) JS Kabylie) |
| — | FW | ALG | Mohamed Baali (from (Algeria) A Bou Saâda) |
| — | FW | MLI | Moctar Cissé (to (Algeria) CS Constantine) |

Out: Note: Flags indicate national team as defined under FIFA eligibility rules; some limited exceptions apply. Players may hold more than one non-FIFA nationality.

| No. | Pos. | Nation | Player |
|---|---|---|---|
| — | DF | ALG | Mohamed Herida (to (Algeria) DRB Tadjenanet) |
| — | FW | ALG | Riad Aït-Abdelmalek (to (Algeria) Olympique de Médéa) |
| — | MF | ALG | Amine Lamali (to (Algeria) USM El Harrach) |

=== Paradou AC ===
Manager: (Portugal) Francisco Chaló

In: Note: Flags indicate national team as defined under FIFA eligibility rules; some limited exceptions apply. Players may hold more than one non-FIFA nationality.

| No. | Pos. | Nation | Player |
|---|---|---|---|
| — | MF | ALG | Raouf Benguit (Loan return from (Algeria) USM Alger) |
| — | DF | ALG | Youcef Attal (Loan return from (Belgium) KV Kortrijk) |

Out: Note: Flags indicate national team as defined under FIFA eligibility rules; some limited exceptions apply. Players may hold more than one non-FIFA nationality.

| No. | Pos. | Nation | Player |
|---|---|---|---|
| — | DF | ALG | Youcef Attal (to (Belgium) KV Kortrijk) |
| — | DF | ALG | Islam Arous (to (Algeria) MC Alger) |
| — | DF | ALG | islam Chahrour (to (Algeria) CS Constantine) |
| 27 | MF | ALG | Raouf Benguit (Loan to (Algeria) USM Alger) |
| — | MF | ALG | Mehdi Droueche (to (Algeria) CA Bordj Bou Arreridj) |
| 34 | FW | ALG | Farid El Mellali (to (France) Angers SCO) |

=== Olympique de Médéa ===
Manager: (Algeria)

In: Note: Flags indicate national team as defined under FIFA eligibility rules; some limited exceptions apply. Players may hold more than one non-FIFA nationality.

| No. | Pos. | Nation | Player |
|---|---|---|---|
| — | FW | ALG | Riad Aït-Abdelmalek (from (Algeria) NA Hussein Dey) |
| — | MF | MLI | Massire Dembele (from (Morocco) Ittihad Khemisset) |
| — | FW | MLI | Lamine Traoré (from (Tunisia) CO Médenine) |

Out: Note: Flags indicate national team as defined under FIFA eligibility rules; some limited exceptions apply. Players may hold more than one non-FIFA nationality.

| No. | Pos. | Nation | Player |
|---|---|---|---|
| — | MF | ALG | Adel Bouchiba (to (Algeria) JS Saoura) |
| — | MF | ALG | Younes Koulkheir (to (Algeria) JS Saoura) |
| — | FW | ALG | El-Bahi Badreddine (to (Algeria) JSM Béjaïa) |

=== USM Alger ===
Manager: (France) Thierry Froger

In: Note: Flags indicate national team as defined under FIFA eligibility rules; some limited exceptions apply. Players may hold more than one non-FIFA nationality.

| No. | Pos. | Nation | Player |
|---|---|---|---|
| — | DF | ALG | Ryad Kenniche (from (Saudi Arabia) Al-Qadsiah) |
| — | FW | ALG | Zakaria Benchaâ (Unattached) |
| — | MF | ALG | Ziri Hammar (Loan return from (Algeria) JS Kabylie) |
| — | DF | ALG | Abderrahim Hamra (Loan return from (Algeria) DRB Tadjenanet) |
| — | FW | ALG | Kaddour Cherif (Loan return from (Algeria) DRB Tadjenanet) |
| — | MF | ALG | Mustapha Bengrina (Loan return from (Algeria) US Biskra) |
| — | MF | ALG | Ibrahim Farhi (Loan return from (Algeria) US Biskra) |
| — | FW | ALG | Aymen Mahious (from (Algeria) CA Batna) |
| — | DF | ALG | Mohamed Mezghrani (from (Netherlands) RKC Waalwijk) |
| — | DF | RWA | Emery Bayisenge (from (Morocco) JS Massira) |
| — | MF | ALG | Raouf Benguit (Loan from (Algeria) Paradou AC) |
| — | FW | ALG | Mohamed Bentiba (from (Algeria) MC Oran) |
| — | FW | ZIM | Charlton Mashumba (from (South Africa) Highlands Park) |
| — | DF | ALG | Mohamed Amine Madani (from (Algeria) JS Saoura) |
| — | FW | CGO | Prince Ibara (from (Qatar) Al-Wakrah) |
| — | DF | CMR | Mexes (from (Republic of the Congo) AS Otôho) |

Out: Note: Flags indicate national team as defined under FIFA eligibility rules; some limited exceptions apply. Players may hold more than one non-FIFA nationality.

| No. | Pos. | Nation | Player |
|---|---|---|---|
| — | DF | ALG | Ayoub Abdellaoui (to (Switzerland) FC Sion) |
| — | DF | ALG | Ryad Kenniche (to (Algeria) CR Belouizdad) |
| — | FW | ALG | Okacha Hamzaoui (Loan return to (Portugal) Nacional) |
| — | MF | ALG | Raouf Benguit (Loan return to (Algeria) Paradou AC) |
| — | MF | ALG | Kaddour Beldjilali (to (Algeria) CS Constantine) |
| — | FW | ALG | Oussama Darfalou (to (Netherlands) Vitesse) |
| — | MF | ALG | Reda Bellahcene (to (Algeria) MO Béjaïa) |
| — | MF | ALG | Ibrahim Farhi (to (Algeria) JS Saoura) |
| — | DF | ALG | Mohamed Amine Madani (to (Algeria) MC El Eulma) |
| — | DF | RWA | Emery Bayisenge (Unattached) |
| — | FW | ZIM | Charlton Mashumba (Unattached) |
| — | FW | ALG | Mohamed Bentiba (to (Algeria) ASM Oran) |
| — | FW | MAR | Reda Hajhouj (to (Morocco) Olympique Khouribga) |
| — | MF | ALG | Ziri Hammar (to (Algeria) MC Oran) |

=== USM Bel Abbès ===
Manager: (Tunisia) Moez Bouakaz

In: Note: Flags indicate national team as defined under FIFA eligibility rules; some limited exceptions apply. Players may hold more than one non-FIFA nationality.

| No. | Pos. | Nation | Player |
|---|---|---|---|
| — | DF | ALG | Boualem Masmoudi (from (Algeria) ASM Oran) |
| — | DF | ALG | Fateh Achour (from (Algeria) GC Mascara) |
| — | GK | ALG | Sofiane Khedairia (from (Algeria) JSM Béjaïa) |
| — | FW | ALG | Mourad Benayad (from (Algeria) ES Sétif) |

Out: Note: Flags indicate national team as defined under FIFA eligibility rules; some limited exceptions apply. Players may hold more than one non-FIFA nationality.

| No. | Pos. | Nation | Player |
|---|---|---|---|
| — | FW | ALG | Habib Bouguelmouna (to (Algeria) ES Sétif) |
| — | FW | ALG | Djamel Chettal (to (Algeria) CR Belouizdad) |
| — | GK | ALG | Athmane Toual (to (Algeria) MO Béjaïa) |

== Ligue Professionnelle 2 ==
=== USM Blida ===
Manager:

In: Note: Flags indicate national team as defined under FIFA eligibility rules; some limited exceptions apply. Players may hold more than one non-FIFA nationality.

| No. | Pos. | Nation | Player |

Out: Note: Flags indicate national team as defined under FIFA eligibility rules; some limited exceptions apply. Players may hold more than one non-FIFA nationality.

| No. | Pos. | Nation | Player |
|---|---|---|---|
| — | FW | ALG | Samy Frioui (to (Greece) AEL Larissa) |
| — | MF | ALG | Brahim Si Ammar (to (Algeria) AS Ain M'lila) |
