= 2015–16 JS Kabylie season =

JS Kabylie
2015–16 season
- Chairman: Mohand Chérif Hannachi
- Head coach: Mourad Karouf (until 16 August 2015); Dominique Bijotat (from 25 August 2015) (until 12 March 2016); Kamel Mouassa (from 14 March 2016)
- Stadium: Stade du 1er Novembre 1954
- Ligue 1: 3rd
- Algerian Cup: Round of 64
- Top goalscorer: League: Banou Diawara (11); All: Banou Diawara (11)

In the 2015–16 season, JS Kabylie competed in the Ligue 1 for the 45th season, as well as the Algerian Cup.

== Players ==
As of 9 October, 2015

Note: Flags indicate national team as defined under FIFA eligibility rules; some limited exceptions apply. Players may hold more than one non-FIFA nationality.

| No. | Pos. | Nation | Player |
|---|---|---|---|
| 3 | DF | ALG | Lamine Medjkane |
| 4 | DF | ALG | Koceila Berchiche |
| 5 | DF | ALG | Ali Rial |
| 6 | DF | ALG | Elyes Seddiki |
| 7 | MF | ALG | Faouzi Rahal |
| 8 | FW | ALG | Salim Boumechra |
| 10 | MF | ALG | Samir Aiboud |
| 11 | FW | ALG | Mohamed Boulaouidet |
| 12 | GK | ALG | Massinissa Messaoudi |
| 15 | FW | ALG | Saïd Ferguène |
| 16 | FW | ALG | Rachid Ferrahi |

| No. | Pos. | Nation | Player |
|---|---|---|---|
| 18 | MF | ALG | Kamel Yesli |
| 19 | MF | ALG | Walid Dourari |
| 20 | FW | BFA | Banou Diawara |
| 21 | MF | ALG | Malek Raiah |
| 22 | MF | ALG | Mohamed Guemroud |
| 27 | FW | ALG | Malek Ihadjadene |
| 28 | DF | BFA | Patrick Malo |
| 30 | GK | ALG | Azzedine Doukha |
| 31 | GK | ALG | Nabil Mazari |
| 33 | DF | ALG | Mohamed Khoutir Ziti |
| 94 | MF | ALG | Ahmed Gagaâ (on loan from Paradou) |

== Competitions ==
=== Overview ===
| Competition | Record | | | | | | | | Started round | Final position / round | First match | Last match |
| Competition | G | W | D | L | GF | GA | GD | Win % | Started round | Final position / round | First match | Last match |
|---|---|---|---|---|---|---|---|---|---|---|---|---|
| Ligue 1 | 30 | 12 | 9 | 9 | 27 | 27 | +0 | 40.00 | —N/a | 3rd | 15 August 2015 | 27 May 2015 |
| Algerian Cup | 1 | 0 | 0 | 1 | 0 | 1 | −1 | 0.00 | Round of 64 | | 19 December 2015 | |
| Total | 31 | 12 | 9 | 10 | 27 | 28 | −1 | 38.71 | | | | |

== League table ==
| Pos | Team | Pld | W | D | L | GF | GA | GD | Pts | Qualification or relegation |
|---|---|---|---|---|---|---|---|---|---|---|
| 1 | USM Alger (C) | 30 | 17 | 7 | 6 | 49 | 31 | +18 | 58 | Qualification for the Champions League first round |
| 2 | JS Saoura | 30 | 12 | 12 | 6 | 39 | 25 | +14 | 48 | Qualification for the Champions League preliminary round |
| 3 | JS Kabylie | 30 | 12 | 9 | 9 | 27 | 27 | 0 | 45 (Note: JS Kabylie ahead of CR Belouizdad on head-to-head record: JSK–CRB 1–0, CRB–JSK 1–1.) | Qualification for the Confederation Cup preliminary round |
| 4 | CR Belouizdad | 30 | 11 | 12 | 7 | 40 | 29 | +11 | 45 | |
| 5 | ES Sétif | 30 | 11 | 11 | 8 | 31 | 19 | +12 | 44 (Note: ES Sétif ahead of MO Béjaïa on head-to-head record: ESS–MOB 0–0, MOB–ESS 0–0.) | |

Updated to match(es) played on 27 May 2016. Source: DZFoot
Rules for classification: 1) points; 2) head-to-head points; 3) head-to-head goal difference; 4) goal difference; 5) total goals; 6) fairplay ranking; 7) playoff.
(C) Champions

=== Results summary ===
| Overall | | | | | | | | Home | | | | | | Away | | | | | |
| Pld | W | D | L | GF | GA | GD | Pts | W | D | L | GF | GA | GD | W | D | L | GF | GA | GD |
|---|---|---|---|---|---|---|---|---|---|---|---|---|---|---|---|---|---|---|---|
| 30 | 12 | 9 | 9 | 27 | 27 | 0 | 45 | 8 | 5 | 2 | 17 | 9 | +8 | 4 | 4 | 7 | 10 | 18 | −8 |

Last updated: 31 January 2015.
Source: Competitive matches

=== Results by round ===
| Round | 1 | 2 | 3 | 4 | 5 | 6 | 7 | 8 | 9 | 10 | 11 | 12 | 13 | 14 | 15 | 16 | 17 | 18 | 19 | 20 | 21 | 22 | 23 | 24 | 25 | 26 | 27 | 28 | 29 | 30 |
|---|---|---|---|---|---|---|---|---|---|---|---|---|---|---|---|---|---|---|---|---|---|---|---|---|---|---|---|---|---|---|
| Ground | A | H | A | H | A | H | A | H | A | H | A | H | A | H | A | H | A | H | A | H | A | H | A | H | A | H | A | H | A | H |
| Result | L | D | L | D | W | D | W | L | W | L | D | D | W | D | L | W | D | L | W | L | D | L | W | W | W | W | W | W | L | D |
| Position | 15 | 13 | 15 | 15 | 11 | 12 | 8 | 11 | 7 | 11 | 9 | 11 | 8 | 9 | 11 | 9 | 9 | 10 | 9 | 10 | 12 | 12 | 11 | 10 | 7 | 6 | 3 | 2 | 3 | 3 |

Updated to match(es) played on 31 January 2015. Source: Competitive matches
A = Away; H = Home; W = Win; D = Draw; L = Loss

=== Matches ===
Win Draw Loss

| 15 August 2015 Round 1 | JS Kabylie | 0–1 | CS Constantine | Tizi Ouzou |
| 18:00 | | Report; Live TV: None | 72' Voavy | Stadium: Stade 1er Novembre 1954; Referee: Ghorbal, Seradj, Charchar |

| 22 August 2015 Round 2 | MO Béjaïa | 0–0 | JS Kabylie | Béjaïa |
| 18:00 | | Report; Live TV: None | | Stadium: Stade de l'Unité Maghrébine; Attendance: 0 (close doors); Referee: Boukhalfa, Etchiali, Zerhouni |

| 29 August 2015 Round 3 | JS Kabylie | 0–1 | USM Alger | Tizi Ouzou |
| 18:00 | Malo (yellow card) 49' | Report; Live TV: None | (yellow card) 35' Mazari; (yellow card) 37' Meftah; 82' Belaïli | Stadium: Stade 1er Novembre 1954; Referee: Benbraham, Bounoua, Allaoua |

| 12 September 2015 Round 4 | CR Belouizdad | 1–1 | JS Kabylie | Belouizdad |
| 18:00 | Bencherifa 90' | Report; Live TV: None | 14' Diawara | Stadium: Stade 20 Août 1955; Referee: Arab, Bayoud, Boulefelfel |

| 19 September 2015 Round 5 | JS Kabylie | 1–0 | RC Relizane | Tizi Ouzou |
| 18:00 | Boulaouidet 11' | Report; Live TV: None | | Stadium: Stade 1er Novembre 1954; Referee: Necib, Maghlout, Benacer |

| 28 September 2015 Round 6 | DRB Tadjenanet | 1–1 | JS Kabylie | Tadjenanet |
| 16:30 | Tembeng 71' | Report; Live TV: None | 52' Boulaouidet | Stadium: Lahoua Smaïl Stadium; Referee: Mial, Selaoudji, Bourouba |

| 2 October 2015 Round 7 | JS Kabylie | 2–1 | JS Saoura | Tizi Ouzou |
| 18:00 | Diawara 5', 34' | Report; Live TV: None | 75' (pen.) Djallit | Stadium: Stade 1er Novembre 1954; Referee: Aouina, Maâmeri, Benhamouda |

| 16 October 2015 Round 8 | MC Alger | 3–1 | JS Kabylie | Bologhine |
| 17:00 | Merzougi 65' (pen.); Gourmi 79'; Karaoui 88' | Report; Live TV: beIN Sports / Al Kass Sports | 33' Diawara | Stadium: Stade Omar Hamadi; Referee: Boukouassa, Hamlaoui, Tazrout |

| 24 October 2015 Round 9 | JS Kabylie | 4–2 | USM El Harrach | Tizi Ouzou |
| 16:00 | Raiah 47'; Boulaouidet 49', 80'; Diawara 58' | Report; Live TV: None | 39', 88' Bouguèche | Stadium: Stade 1er Novembre 1954; Referee: Arab, Biod, Boulfelfel |

| 30 October 2015 Round 10 | NA Hussein Dey | 2–1 | JS Kabylie | Belouizdad |
| 15:00 | Gasmi 38'; Benayad 80' | Report; Live TV: None | 65' Boulaouidet | Stadium: Stade 20 Août 1955; Referee: Necib, Meghlout, Benaceur |

| 6 November 2015 Round 11 | JS Kabylie | 0–0 | USM Blida | Tizi Ouzou |
| 16:00 | | Report; Live TV: beIN Sports / TV Tamazight 4 | | Stadium: Stade 1er Novembre 1954; Referee: Achouri, Boulfelfel, Tamene |

| 20 November 2015 Round 12 | RC Arbaâ | 1–1 | JS Kabylie | Larbaâ |
| 15:00 | Guessan 6' (pen.) | Report; Live TV: None | 72' (pen.) Boulaouidet | Stadium: Stade Ismaïl Makhlouf; Referee: Aouina, Benaicha, Benhamoud |

| 28 November 2015 Round 13 | JS Kabylie | 2–0 | ASM Oran | Tizi Ouzou |
| 16:00 | Diawara 28', 40' | Report; Live TV: None | | Stadium: Stade 1er Novembre 1954; Referee: Benbraham, Gourari, Allaoua |

| 12 December 2015 Round 14 | JS Kabylie | 0–0 | ES Sétif | Tizi Ouzou |
| 16:00 | | Report; Live TV: Algérie 3 | | Stadium: Stade 1er Novembre 1954; Referee: Arab, Beyoum, Hamlaoui |

| 26 December 2015 Round 15 | MC Oran | 2–0 | JS Kabylie | Oran |
| 16:00 | Za'abia 62'; Nessakh 75' | Report; Live TV: Canal Algérie | | Stadium: Stade Ahmed Zabana; Referee: Abid Charef, Boulfelfel, Tamen |

| 16 January 2016 Round 16 | CS Constantine | 0–1 | JS Kabylie | Constantine |
| 16:00 | | Report; Live TV: Canal Algérie | 60' Ferhani | Stadium: Stade Mohamed Hamlaoui; Referee: Aouina, Benaïssa, Kechida |

| 23 January 2016 Round 17 | JS Kabylie | 1–1 | MO Béjaïa | Tizi Ouzou |
| 16:00 | Diawara 39' | Report; Live TV: Algérie 3 | 69' Ndoye | Stadium: Stade 1er Novembre 1954; Referee: Boukouassa, Brahim, Bounoua |

| 30 January 2016 Round 18 | USM Alger | 2–0 | JS Kabylie | Bologhine |
| 16:00 | Nadji 75'; Boudebouda 90' | Report; Live TV: Canal Algérie / Al Kass Sports | | Stadium: Stade Omar Hamadi; Referee: Boukhalfa, Ghoumari, Zerhouni |

| 5 February 2016 Round 19 | JS Kabylie | 1–0 | CR Belouizdad | Tizi Ouzou |
| 15:00 | Diawara 18' | Report; Live TV: TV Tamazight 4 | | Stadium: Stade 1er Novembre 1954; Referee: Abid, Tamen, Boulfelfel |

| 13 February 2016 Round 20 | RC Relizane | 1–0 | JS Kabylie | Relizane |
| 16:00 | Tiaïba 27' (pen.) | Report; Live TV: None | | Stadium: Stade Tahar Zoughari; Referee: Halalchi, Goulache, Azrine |

| 27 February 2016 Round 21 | JS Kabylie | 1–1 | DRB Tadjenanet | Tizi Ouzou |
| 16:00 | Boulaouidet 39' | Report; Live TV: Canal Algérie / Algérie 3 | 89' (o.g.) Berchiche | Stadium: Stade 1er Novembre 1954; Referee: Arab, Brahimi, Biyoud |

| 12 March 2016 Round 22 | JS Saoura | 3–0 | JS Kabylie | Béchar |
| 18:00 | Bapidi 48'; Hammar 57'; Djallit 86' | Report | | Stadium: Stade 20 Août 1955; Referee: Achouri, Tamen, Benhamouda |

| 19 March 2016 Round 23 | JS Kabylie | 2–1 | MC Alger | Tizi Ouzou |
| 16:00 | Diawara 35' (pen.); Mebarki 78' | Report; Live TV: Algérie 3 | 24' (pen.) Abid | Stadium: Stade 1er Novembre 1954; Referee: Abid-Charef, Gourari, Boulfelfel |

| 2 April 2016 Round 24 | USM El Harrach | 0–1 | JS Kabylie | El Harrach |
| 16:00 | | Report; Live TV: None | 37' (pen.) Rial | Stadium: Stade 1er Novembre 1954; Referee: Necib, Maghlout, Benacer |

| 9 April 2016 Round 25 | JS Kabylie | 1–0 | NA Hussein Dey | Tizi Ouzou |
| 16:00 | Boulaouidet 22' | Report; Live TV: Algérie 3 | | Stadium: Stade 1er Novembre 1954; Referee: Achouri, Gourari, Benhammouda |

| 23 April 2016 Round 26 | USM Blida | 0–2 | JS Kabylie | Blida |
| 16:00 | | Report; Live TV: None | 85' Boulaouidet; 86' Medjkane | Stadium: Stade Frères Brakni; Referee: Abid Charef, Gourari, Boulfelfel |

| 30 April 2016 Round 27 | JS Kabylie | 2–1 | RC Arbaâ | Tizi Ouzou |
| 16:00 | Diawara 33'; Mebarki 55' | Report; Live TV: None | 85' Kadri | Stadium: Stade 1er Novembre 1954; Referee: Benabdellah, Oudan, Benadda |

| 13 May 2016 Round 28 | ASM Oran | 0–1 | JS Kabylie | Oran |
| 17:30 | | Report; Live TV: None | 89' Boulaouidet | Stadium: Stade Habib Bouakeul; Referee: M. Mial |

| 20 May 2016 Round 29 | ES Sétif | 2–0 | JS Kabylie | Sétif |
| 17:30 | Delhoum 36'; Kourbiaa 59' | Report; Live TV: Algérie 3 | | Stadium: Stade 8 Mai 1945; Referee: Arab, Hamlaoui, Biodh |

| 27 May 2016 Round 30 | JS Kabylie | 0–0 | MC Oran | Tizi Ouzou |
| 17:30 | | Report; Live TV: beIN Sports, TV Tamazight 4 | | Stadium: Stade 1er Novembre 1954; Referee: Ibrir, Baâziz, Chellali |

== Algerian Cup ==
| 19 December 2015 Round of 64 | RC Relizane | 1–0 | JS Kabylie | Relizane |
| 14:15 | Kouadio 68' | Report | | Stadium: Stade Tahar Zoughari; Referee: Necib, Meghlout, Benacer |

== Squad information ==
=== Playing statistics ===
| No. | Pos | Nat | Player | Total | | Ligue 1 | | Algerian Cup | |
| No. | Pos | Nat | Player | Apps | Goals | Apps | Goals | Apps | Goals |
|---|---|---|---|---|---|---|---|---|---|
| 12 | GK | (Algeria) ALG | Massinissa Messaoudi | 4 | 0 | 4 | 0 | 0 | 0 |
| 30 | GK | (Algeria) ALG | Azzedine Doukha | 26 | 0 | 25 | 0 | 1 | 0 |
| 31 | GK | (Algeria) ALG | Nabil Mazari | 0 | 0 | 0 | 0 | 0 | 0 |
| | GK | (Algeria) ALG | Abderrahmane Boultif | 4 | 0 | 4 | 0 | 0 | 0 |
| 3 | DF | (Algeria) ALG | Lamine Medjkane | 19 | 1 | 18 | 1 | 1 | 0 |
| 4 | DF | (Algeria) ALG | Koceila Berchiche | 30 | 0 | 29 | 0 | 1 | 0 |
| 5 | DF | (Algeria) ALG | Ali Rial | 26 | 1 | 26 | 1 | 0 | 0 |
| 28 | DF | (Burkina Faso) BFA | Patrick Malo | 24 | 1 | 23 | 1 | 1 | 0 |
| 33 | DF | (Algeria) ALG | Mohamed Khoutir Ziti | 25 | 0 | 25 | 0 | 0 | 0 |
| | DF | (Algeria) ALG | Houari Ferhani | 14 | 1 | 14 | 1 | 0 | 0 |
| 7 | MF | (Algeria) ALG | Faouzi Rahal | 24 | 0 | 24 | 0 | 0 | 0 |
| 10 | MF | (Algeria) ALG | Samir Aiboud | 18 | 0 | 17 | 0 | 1 | 0 |
| 21 | MF | (Algeria) ALG | Malik Raiah | 27 | 1 | 26 | 1 | 1 | 0 |
| 22 | MF | (Algeria) ALG | Mohamed Guemroud | 6 | 0 | 5 | 0 | 1 | 0 |
| 94 | MF | (Algeria) ALG | Ahmed Gagaâ | 7 | 0 | 7 | 0 | 0 | 0 |
| | MF | (Algeria) ALG | Hocine Harrouche | 12 | 0 | 12 | 0 | 0 | 0 |
| 8 | FW | (Algeria) ALG | Salim Boumechra | 15 | 0 | 14 | 0 | 1 | 0 |
| 11 | FW | (Algeria) ALG | Mohamed Boulaouidet | 29 | 9 | 28 | 9 | 1 | 0 |
| 15 | FW | (Algeria) ALG | Saïd Ferguène | 9 | 0 | 8 | 0 | 1 | 0 |
| 16 | FW | (Algeria) ALG | Rachid Ferrahi | 21 | 0 | 20 | 0 | 1 | 0 |
| 20 | FW | (Burkina Faso) BFA | Banou Diawara | 25 | 11 | 25 | 11 | 0 | 0 |
| 27 | FW | (Algeria) ALG | Malek Ihadjadene | 7 | 0 | 6 | 0 | 1 | 0 |
| | FW | (Algeria) ALG | Billel Mebarki | 15 | 2 | 15 | 2 | 0 | 0 |
| | FW | (Algeria) ALG | Mohand Hantat | 5 | 0 | 5 | 0 | 0 | 0 |
| | FW | (Algeria) ALG | Massinissa Tafni | 5 | 0 | 4 | 0 | 1 | 0 |
| | FW | (Algeria) ALG | Anis Renaï | 2 | 0 | 2 | 0 | 0 | 0 |
Players transferred out during the season
| 6 | DF | (Algeria) ALG | Elyes Seddiki | 13 | 0 | 13 | 0 | 0 | 0 |
| 18 | MF | (Algeria) ALG | Kamel Yesli | 6 | 0 | 6 | 0 | 0 | 0 |

Last updated: 11 June 2016
Source: fr.soccerway.com

=== Goalscorers ===
Includes all competitive matches. The list is sorted alphabetically by surname when total goals are equal.

| No. | Nat. | Player | Pos. | L 1 | AC | TOTAL |
|---|---|---|---|---|---|---|
| 20 | (Burkina Faso) | Banou Diawara | FW | 11 | 0 | 11 |
| 11 | (Algeria) | Mohamed Boulaouidet | FW | 9 | 0 | 9 |
| | (Algeria) | Billel Mebarki | FW | 2 | 0 | 2 |
| 3 | (Algeria) | Lamine Medjkane | DF | 1 | 0 | 1 |
| 5 | (Algeria) | Ali Rial | DF | 1 | 0 | 1 |
| | (Algeria) | Houari Ferhani | DF | 1 | 0 | 1 |
| 28 | (Burkina Faso) | Patrick Malo | DF | 1 | 0 | 1 |
| 21 | (Algeria) | Malik Raiah | MF | 1 | 0 | 1 |
| Own Goals | | | | 0 | 0 | 0 |
| Totals | | | | 27 | 0 | 27 |

== Transfers ==
=== In ===
| Date | Pos | Player | From club | Transfer fee | Source |
|---|---|---|---|---|---|
| 9 June 2015 | MF | (Algeria) Salim Boumechra | USM El Harrach | Free transfer | |
| 10 June 2015 | DF | (Algeria) Elyes Seddiki | RC Arbaâ | Free transfer | |
| 13 June 2015 | DF | (Algeria) Koceila Berchiche | MC Alger | Free transfer | |
| 13 June 2015 | MF | (Algeria) Faouzi Rahal | MO Béjaïa | Free transfer | |
| 1 July 2015 | DF | (Algeria) Lamine Medjkane | (France) FC Dieppe | Free transfer | |
| 1 July 2015 | FW | (Algeria) Mohamed Boulaouidet | Olympique de Médéa | Free transfer | |
| 10 July 2015 | FW | (Burkina Faso) Banou Diawara | (Burkina Faso) Bobo Dioulasso | Free transfer | |
| 19 July 2015 | DF | (Burkina Faso) Patrick Malo | (Burkina Faso) SOA | Free transfer | |

=== Out ===
| Date | Pos | Player | To club | Transfer fee | Source |
|---|---|---|---|---|---|
| 21 June 2015 | DF | (Algeria) Zineddine Mekkaoui | CS Constantine | Free transfer | |
| 1 July 2015 | FW | (Algeria) Mourad Ilyes Youcef Khoudja | ASO Chlef | Free transfer | |
| 1 July 2015 | DF | (Algeria) Youcef Benamara | USM Blida | Free transfer | |
| 1 July 2015 | MF | (Algeria) Abdelghani Khiat | DRB Tadjenanet | Free transfer | |
| 1 July 2015 | FW | (Cameroon) Rafael Kooh Sohna | (Malta) Gżira United | Free transfer | |
| 1 July 2015 | DF | (Algeria) Hamza Yadroudj | ASO Chlef | Free transfer | |
| 1 July 2015 | FW | (Algeria) Ibrahim Si Ammar | MC El Eulma | Free transfer | |
| 1 July 2015 | GK | (Algeria) Nadir Benoufella | US Beni Douala | Free transfer | |
| 4 July 2015 | DF | (Algeria) Djamel Benlamri | ES Sétif | Free transfer | |
| 15 July 2015 | MF | (Algeria) Ahmed Mekehout | USM Bel Abbès | Free transfer | |
