= 2017–18 JS Kabylie season =

JS Kabylie
2017–18 season
- Chairman: Mohand Chérif Hannachi (until 7 August 2017); Abdelhamid Sadmi (from 7 September 2017)
- Head coach: Mourad Rahmouni & Fawzi Moussouni (until 28 September 2017); Jean-Yves Chay (from 10 October 2017) (until October 2017); Azzedine Aït Djoudi (from 2 November 2017)
- Stadium: Stade du 1er Novembre 1954
- Ligue 1: 11th
- Algerian Cup: Runners-up
- Top goalscorer: League: Mehdi Benaldjia (10); All: Mehdi Benaldjia (12)

In the 2017–18 season, JS Kabylie competed in the Ligue 1 for the 47th season, as well as the Algerian Cup.

== Competitions ==
=== Overview ===
Competition	Record								Started round	Final position / round	First match	Last match
Competition	G	W	D	L	GF	GA	GD	Win %	Started round	Final position / round	First match	Last match
Ligue 1	30	8	12	10	34	39	−5	26.67	—N/a	11th	26 August 2017	19 May 2018
Algerian Cup	6	4	1	1	7	3	+4	66.67	Round of 64	Runners-up	28 December 2017	1 May 2018
Total	36	12	13	11	41	42	−1	33.33				

Updated to match played 19 May 2018
Source: Competitions

== League table ==
Pos	Team	Pld	W	D	L	GF	GA	GD	Pts	Qualification or relegation
9	DRB Tadjenanet	30	10	7	13	33	41	−8	37 (Note: Ranked on head-to-head results.)	
10	USM Bel Abbès (Note: USM Bel Abbès were deducted 6 points. FIFA's decision was taken at its meeting on 9 June 2017, ordering the club to pay the amount due to the player Jessy Mayele as well as a fine of CHF 15,000 (15,000 Swiss francs).)	30	12	7	11	32	31	+1	37	Qualification for the 2018–19 Confederation Cup
11	JS Kabylie	30	8	12	10	34	39	−5	36 (Note: Ranked on head-to-head results.)	
12	CR Belouizdad	30	7	15	8	24	27	−3	36	
13	Olympique de Médéa	30	8	12	10	23	32	−9	36	

Updated to match(es) played on 19 May 2018. Source: DZFoot
Rules for classification: 1) points; 2) head-to-head points; 3) head-to-head goal difference; 4) goal difference; 5) total goals; 6) fairplay ranking; 7) playoff.

=== Results summary ===
Overall								Home						Away					
Pld	W	D	L	GF	GA	GD	Pts	W	D	L	GF	GA	GD	W	D	L	GF	GA	GD
30	8	12	10	34	39	−5	36	7	7	1	25	16	+9	1	5	9	9	23	−14

Last updated: 30 January 2016.
Source: Competitive matches

=== Results by round ===
Round	1	2	3	4	5	6	7	8	9	10	11	12	13	14	15	16	17	18	19	20	21	22	23	24	25	26	27	28	29	30
Ground	H	A	H	A	H	A	H	A	H	A	H	A	H	A	H	A	H	A	H	A	H	A	H	A	H	A	H	A	H	A
Result	D	W	D	L	W	L	W	L	D	D	D	D	L	D	D	L	D	L	D	L	W	L	W	D	W	D	W	L	W	L
Position	7	3	5	8	6	10	9	9	10	10	9	10	11	12	12	13	11	14	12	14	13	13	11	12	11	12	9	11	11	11

Source: Competitive matches
A = Away; H = Home; W = Win; D = Draw; L = Loss

=== Matches ===
Win Draw Loss

26 August 2017 Round 1	JS Kabylie	1–1	JS Saoura	Tizi Ouzou
19:00	Djabout 36' (pen.)	Soccerway report Live TV: None	22' Yahia-Chérif	Stadium: November 1, 1954 Stadium; Referee: Lahlou Benbraham

9 September 2017 Round 2	USM Blida	2–3	JS Kabylie	Blida
17:00	Frioui 39' (pen.), 67'	Soccerway report Live TV: None	31' Djabout; 54' Oukaci; 71' Yettou	Stadium: Brakni Brothers Stadium; Referee: Merzak Halalchi

15 September 2017 Round 3	JS Kabylie	1–1	Paradou AC	Tizi Ouzou
17:00	Boukhenchouche 10'	Soccerway report Live TV: None	39' Bouchina	Stadium: November 1, 1954 Stadium; Attendance: 0 (close doors); Referee: Mohamed Saïdi

22 September 2017 Round 4	NA Hussein Dey	2–1	JS Kabylie	Belouizdad
17:00	Gasmi 35' (pen.); Cheurfaoui 73'	Soccerway report Live TV: EPTV Terrestre	24' Benaldjia	Stadium: Stade 20 Août 1955; Referee: Mehdi Abid Charef; Man of the Match: Benaldjia

30 September 2017 Round 5	JS Kabylie	1–0	DRB Tadjenanet	Tizi Ouzou
17:00	Tafni 77'	Soccerway report Live TV: Canal Algérie		Stadium: November 1, 1954 Stadium; Referee: Mustapha Bessiri

12 October 2017 Round 6	USM Bel-Abbès	4–1	JS Kabylie	Sidi Bel Abbès
17:45	Belhocini 22', 26'; Belahouel 71'; Kherbache 90'	Soccerway report Live TV: TV Tamazight 4	47' (pen.) Boukhenchouche	Stadium: Stade 24 Fevrier 1956; Referee: Boubekeur Zouaoui

17 October 2017 Round 7	JS Kabylie	2–1	USM El Harrach	Tizi Ouzou
17:00	Ekedi 30'; Benaldjia 46'	Soccerway report Live TV: None	22' Banouh	Stadium: November 1, 1954 Stadium; Referee: Mustapha Ghorbal

21 October 2017 Round 8	MC Alger	2–0	JS Kabylie	Bologhine
17:45	Derrardja 19', 63'	Soccerway report Live TV: TV Tamazight 4		Stadium: Omar Hamadi Stadium; Referee: Said Aouina

27 October 2017 Round 9	JS Kabylie	0–0	US Biskra	Tizi Ouzou
16:00		Soccerway report Live TV: None		Stadium: November 1, 1954 Stadium; Referee: Mohamed Saïdi

7 November 2017 Round 10	ES Sétif	0–0	JS Kabylie	Sétif
17:00		Soccerway report Live TV: EPTV Terrestre		Stadium: Stade 8 Mai 1945; Referee: Said Aouina

11 November 2017 Round 11	JS Kabylie	2–2	CR Belouizdad	Tizi Ouzou
16:00	Yettou 4'; Benaldjia 46'	Soccerway report Live TV: Canal Algérie	22' Bellaili; 38' Lakroum	Stadium: November 1, 1954 Stadium; Referee: Rafik Achouri

17 November 2017 Round 12	Olympique de Médéa	0–0	JS Kabylie	Médéa
15:00		Soccerway report Live TV: None		Stadium: Stade Imam Lyes de Médéa; Referee: Lotfi Bekouassa

1 December 2017 Round 13	JS Kabylie	1–2	CS Constantine	Tizi Ouzou
16:00	Saadou 28'	Soccerway report Live TV: EPTV Terrestre / TV Tamazight 4	67', 84' Abid	Stadium: November 1, 1954 Stadium; Referee: Nabil Boukhalfa

8 December 2017 Round 14	USM Alger	0–0	JS Kabylie	Bologhine
17:00		Soccerway report Live TV: TV Tamazight 4		Stadium: Omar Hamadi Stadium; Referee: Mohamed Saïdi

15 December 2017 Round 15	JS Kabylie	3–3	MC Oran	Tizi Ouzou
16:00	Djabout 65', 70', 87'	Soccerway report Live TV: Algérie 3 / Canal Algérie	9' Gharbi; 18' Tiaïba; 60' Frifer	Stadium: November 1, 1954 Stadium; Referee: Merzak Halalchi

5 January 2018 Round 16	JS Saoura	2–0	JS Kabylie	Béchar
18:00	Djallit 61', 81'	Soccerway report Live TV: None		Stadium: Stade 20 Août 1955; Referee: Abderrezzak Arab

19 January 2018 Round 17	JS Kabylie	1–1	USM Blida	Tizi Ouzou
16:00	Bouhaniche 36' (o.g.)	Soccerway report Live TV: None	73' (pen.) Frioui	Stadium: November 1, 1954 Stadium; Referee: Lotfi Bekouassa

26 January 2018 Round 18	Paradou AC	2–0	JS Kabylie	Bologhine
16:00	Naidji 40' (pen.), 50'	Soccerway report Live TV: TV Tamazight 4		Stadium: Omar Hamadi Stadium; Referee: Said Aouina

10 February 2018 Round 19	JS Kabylie	1–1	NA Hussein Dey	Tizi Ouzou
16:00	Benaldjia 78'	Soccerway report Live TV: None	47' Brahimi	Stadium: November 1, 1954 Stadium; Referee: Mohamed Saïdi

16 February 2018 Round 20	DRB Tadjenanet	1–0	JS Kabylie	Tadjenanet
16:00	Hadded 52'	Soccerway report Live TV: EPTV Terrestre		Stadium: Lahoua Smaïl Stadium; Referee: Nabil Boukhalfa

23 February 2018 Round 21	JS Kabylie	2–1	USM Bel-Abbès	Tizi Ouzou
16:00	Hammar 15' (pen.); Benaldjia 56'	Soccerway report Live TV: Algérie 3 / TV Tamazight 4	72' Seguer	Stadium: November 1, 1954 Stadium; Referee: Hamza Bouslimani

9 March 2018 Round 22	USM El Harrach	2–0	JS Kabylie	El Harrach
16:00	Bougueroua 11'; Bouguèche 74'	Soccerway report Live TV: None		Stadium: November 1, 1954 Stadium; Referee: Mehdi Abid Charef

30 March 2018 Round 24	US Biskra	1–1	JS Kabylie	Biskra
16:00	El Okbi 51' (pen.)	Soccerway report Live TV: None	68' Benaldjia	Stadium: El Alia Sports Complex; Referee: Mustapha Bessiri

3 April 2018 Round 23	JS Kabylie	3–1	MC Alger	Tizi Ouzou
17:00	Djabout 8'; Hammar 32'; Benaldjia 75'	Soccerway report Live TV: Al-Kass Sports / EPTV Terrestre / TV Tamazight 4	20' (pen.) Derrardja	Stadium: November 1, 1954 Stadium; Referee: Mustapha Ghorbal

7 April 2018 Round 25	JS Kabylie	1–0	ES Sétif	Tizi Ouzou
16:00	Benyoucef 77'	Soccerway report Live TV: Al-Kass Sports / Algérie 3		Stadium: November 1, 1954 Stadium; Referee: Missoum Benabdellah

20 April 2018 Round 26	CR Belouizdad	1–1	JS Kabylie	Belouizdad
16:00	Bourenane 55' (pen.)	Soccerway report Live TV: TV Tamazight 4	74' Yettou	Stadium: Stade 20 Août 1955; Referee: Mohamed Saïdi

24 April 2018 Round 27	JS Kabylie	3–0	Olympique de Médéa	Tizi Ouzou
16:00	Yettou 36', 58'; Benaldjia 53'	Soccerway report Live TV: None		Stadium: November 1, 1954 Stadium; Referee: Redouane Necib

4 May 2018 Round 28	CS Constantine	2–1	JS Kabylie	Constantine
16:00	Lamri 39'; Abid 65'	Soccerway report Live TV: Algérie 3 / TV Tamazight 4	41' Yettou	Stadium: Stade Mohamed Hamlaoui; Referee: Merzak Halalchi

11 May 2018 Round 29	JS Kabylie	3–2	USM Alger	Tizi Ouzou
16:00	Yettou 20'; Benyahia 64' (o.g.); Radouani 73'	Soccerway report Live TV: None	80', 89' Darfalou	Stadium: November 1, 1954 Stadium; Attendance: 0 (close doors); Referee: Farouk Mial

19 May 2018 Round 30	MC Oran	2–1	JS Kabylie	Aïn Témouchent (Note: MC Oran play away from home and behind closed doors because of the violence in a meeting in the Ligue Professionnelle 1 against CR Belouizdad.)
16:00	Mekkaoui 21'; Benamara 61'	Soccerway report Live TV: None	72' Mesbahi	Stadium: Omar Oucief Stadium; Attendance: 0 (close doors); Referee: Ibrir

== Algerian Cup ==
28 December 2017 Round of 64	JS Kabylie	1–0	ES Ben Aknoun	Tizi Ouzou
17:00	Benaldjia 8'	Live TV: TV Tamazight 4		Stadium: November 1, 1954 Stadium; Referee: Nader, Oumari, Sarradj

13 January 2018 Round of 32	JS Kabylie	2–0	RCB Oued Rhiou	Tizi Ouzou
16:00	Benyoucef 6'; Benaldjia 42'	Live TV: None		Stadium: November 1, 1954 Stadium; Referee: Brahimi A., Tamen, Boulfelfel

2 February 2018 Round of 16	CRB Dar El Beïda	0–1	JS Kabylie	Dar El Beïda
14:30		Live TV: Algérie 3	48' Yettou	Stadium: Stade Omar Benrabah; Referee: Redouane Necib

24 March 2018 Quarter-finals	JS Kabylie	2–1	USM Blida	Algiers
16:00	Benyoucef 71'; Radouani 82'	Report; Live TV: Canal Algérie / Algérie 3	90+4' Herbache	Stadium: July 5, 1962 Stadium; Referee: Abderrezzak Arab

13 April 2018 Semi-final	JS Kabylie	0–0 (a.e.t.) (5–4 p)	MC Alger	Constantine
16:00		Report; Live TV: TV Tamazight 4 / EPTV Terrestre / Al-Kass Sports		Stadium: Stade Mohamed Hamlaoui; Attendance: 45,000; Referee: Said Aouina
	Penalties
	Boukhenchouche (penalty scored); Benyoucef (penalty scored); Raiah (penalty scored); Saâdou (penalty missed); Djabout (penalty scored); Benaldjia (penalty scored)		(penalty scored) Derrardja; (penalty missed) Hachoud; (penalty scored) Bendebka; (penalty scored) Azzi; (penalty scored) Souibaâh; (penalty missed) Ammachi

1 May 2017 Final	JS Kabylie	1–2	USM Bel Abbès	Algiers
16:00	Djerrar 56'	Report	Belahouel 2', 49'	Stadium: Stade 5 Juillet 1962; Attendance: 55,000; Referee: Mehdi Abid Charef

== Squad information ==
=== Playing statistics ===
No.	Pos	Nat	Player	Total		Ligue 1		Algerian Cup	
No.	Pos	Nat	Player	Apps	Goals	Apps	Goals	Apps	Goals
30	GK	(Algeria) ALG	Malik Asselah	19	0	15	0	4	0
16	GK	(Algeria) ALG	Abderrahmane Boultif	18	0	15	0	3	0
4	DF	(Algeria) ALG	Essaid Belkalem	11	0	9	0	2	0
15	DF	(Algeria) ALG	Ilyes Chetti	17	0	14	0	3	0
8	DF	(Algeria) ALG	Houari Ferhani	23	0	20	0	3	0
29	DF	(Algeria) ALG	Ali Guitoune	14	0	12	0	2	0
27	DF	(Algeria) ALG	Juba Oukaci	23	1	19	1	4	0
2	DF	(Algeria) ALG	Saâdi Radouani	30	2	25	1	5	1
5	DF	(Algeria) ALG	Nabil Saâdou	30	1	24	1	6	0
45	DF	(Algeria) ALG	Bilal Tizi Bouali	5	0	3	0	2	0
7	MF	(Algeria) ALG	Mehdi Benaldjia	33	11	28	9	5	2
6	MF	(Algeria) ALG	Lyes Benyoucef	18	3	13	1	5	2
17	MF	(Algeria) ALG	Salim Boukhenchouche	25	2	21	2	4	0
19	MF	(Algeria) ALG	Adel Djerrar	25	1	21	0	4	1
22	MF	(Algeria) ALG	Mohamed Guemroud	17	0	14	0	3	0
11	MF	(Algeria) ALG	Ziri Hammar	16	2	13	2	3	0
	MF	(Algeria) ALG	Mohamed Amine Ouguenoune	1	0	1	0	0	0
21	MF	(Algeria) ALG	Malik Raiah	32	0	26	0	6	0
9	MF	(Algeria) ALG	Nazim Si Salem	12	0	10	0	2	0
23	MF	(Algeria) ALG	Nassim Yettou	35	7	29	6	6	1
10	FW	(Algeria) ALG	Adil Djabout	30	6	25	6	5	0
18	FW	(Cameroon) CMR	Steve Ekedi	8	1	8	1	0	0
	FW	(Algeria) ALG	Ahmed Mesbahi	10	1	9	1	1	0
	FW	(Algeria) ALG	Anis Renaï	6	0	5	0	1	0
20	FW	(Algeria) ALG	Massinissa Tafni	20	1	17	1	3	0
Players transferred out during the season
45	DF	(Algeria) ALG	Fayçal Abdat	12	0	12	0	0	0

Last updated: 11 June 2018
Source: fr.soccerway.com

=== Goalscorers ===
Includes all competitive matches. The list is sorted alphabetically by surname when total goals are equal.

No.	Nat.	Player	Pos.	L 1	AC	TOTAL
7	(Algeria)	Mehdi Benaldjia	MF	10	2	12
23	(Algeria)	Nassim Yettou	MF	6	1	7
10	(Algeria)	Adil Djabout	FW	6	0	6
6	(Algeria)	Lyes Benyoucef	MF	1	2	3
2	(Algeria)	Saâdi Radouani	DF	1	1	2
17	(Algeria)	Salim Boukhenchouche	MF	2	0	2
11	(Algeria)	Ziri Hammar	MF	2	0	2
27	(Algeria)	Juba Oukaci	DF	1	0	1
5	(Algeria)	Nabil Saâdou	DF	1	0	1
19	(Algeria)	Adel Djerrar	MF	0	1	1
18	(Cameroon)	Steve Ekedi	FW	1	0	1
	(Algeria)	Ahmed Mesbahi	FW	1	0	1
20	(Algeria)	Massinissa Tafni	FW	1	0	1
Own Goals				2	0	2
Totals				35	7	42

== Squad list ==
As of August 25, 2017. Note: Flags indicate national team as defined under FIFA eligibility rules; some limited exceptions apply. Players may hold more than one non-FIFA nationality.

No.	Pos.	Nation	Player
2	DF	ALG	Saâdi Radouani
4	DF	ALG	Fayçal Abdat
5	DF	ALG	Nabil Saâdou
7	MF	ALG	Mehdi Benaldjia
8	DF	ALG	Houari Ferhani
9	FW	ALG	Nazim Si Salem
10	FW	ALG	Adil Djabout
15	MF	ALG	Ilyes Chetti
16	GK	ALG	Abderrahmane Boultif
17	MF	ALG	Salim Boukhenchouche
18	FW	CMR	Steve Ekedi
19	MF	ALG	Adel Djerrar
20	FW	ALG	Massinissa Tafni
21	MF	ALG	Malik Raiah (captain)

No.	Pos.	Nation	Player
22	MF	ALG	Mohamed Guemroud
23	MF	ALG	Nassim Yettou
27	MF	ALG	Juba Oukaci
30	GK	ALG	Malik Asselah
38	DF	ALG	Makhlouf Naït Rabah
45	DF	ALG	Bilal Tizi Bouali
50	GK	ALG	Anouar Saidoun
-	MF	ALG	Mohamed Amine Ouguenoune
-	DF	ALG	Yanis Haroun
-	FW	ALG	Nasreddine Benabou
-	FW	ALG	Thomas Izerghouf
-	DF	ALG	Smail Meziane
-	DF	ALG	Youcef Dahlal
-	DF	ALG	Ramdane Ferguene

== Transfers ==
=== In ===
Date	Pos	Player	From club	Transfer fee	Source
27 June 2017	DF	(Algeria) Nabil Saâdou	Olympique de Médéa	325,000 €	
1 July 2017	DF	(Algeria) Ilyes Chetti	US Chaouia	Free transfer	
1 July 2017	MF	(Algeria) Salim Boukhenchouche	Olympique de Médéa	250,000 €	
3 July 2017	FW	(Algeria) Adil Djabout	US Biskra	275,000 €	
20 July 2017	CB	(Algeria) Anis Haroun	US Beni Douala	Free transfer	
20 July 2017	DF	(Algeria) Fayçal Abdat	USM El Harrach	250,000 €	
23 July 2017	FW	(Algeria) Nazim Si Salem	Olympique de Médéa	Free transfer	
29 July 2017	FW	(Cameroon) Steve Ekedi	(Portugal) Desportivo das Aves	Free transfer	
27 December 2017	MF	(Algeria) Lyes Benyoucef	Paradou AC	Loan for 18 months	
28 December 2017	AM	(Algeria) Ziri Hammar	USM Alger	Loan for six months	
15 January 2018	DF	(Algeria) Essaid Belkalem	Unattached	Free transfer	
15 January 2018	DF	(Algeria) Ali Guitoune	DRB Tadjenanet	Free transfer (Released)	

=== Out ===
Date	Pos	Player	To club	Transfer fee	Source
1 July 2017	DF	(Algeria) Touhami Sebie	CA Bordj Bou Arreridj	Free transfer	
15 July 2017	MF	(Algeria) Samir Aiboud	ES Sétif	Free transfer	
17 July 2017	DF	(Algeria) Mohamed Boulaouidet	NA Hussein Dey	Free transfer	
19 July 2017	DF	(Algeria) Sofiane Khelili	USM El Harrach	Free transfer	
23 July 2017	MF	(Algeria) Lamine Medjkane	JSM Skikda	Free transfer	
30 July 2017	MF	(Algeria) Karim Baïteche	USM El Harrach	Free transfer	
27 December 2017	FW	(Algeria) Nasreddine Benabbou	MC Saïda	Free transfer	
