= 2016–17 JS Kabylie season =

JS Kabylie
2016–17 season
- Chairman: Mohand Chérif Hannachi
- Head coach: Kamel Mouassa (until 17 October 2016); Sofiene Hidoussi (from 27 October 2016) (until 4 February 2017); Mourad Rahmouni & Fawzi Moussouni (from 14 February 2017)
- Stadium: Stade du 1er Novembre 1954
- Ligue 1: 11th
- Algerian Cup: Quarter-finals
- Confederation Cup: Play-off round
- Top goalscorer: League: Mohamed Boulaouidet (7); All: Mohamed Boulaouidet (15)

In the 2016–17 season, JS Kabylie competed in the Ligue 1 for the 46th season, as well as the Algerian Cup. It was their 46th consecutive season in the top flight of Algerian football. They also competed in the Confederation Cup.

== Non-competitive ==
=== Pre-season ===
27 July 2016 Friendly	Club Africain (Tunisia)	0-0	(Algeria) JS Kabylie
16:00 UTC+1

== Competitions ==
=== Overview ===
Competition	Record								Started round	Final position / round	First match	Last match
Competition	G	W	D	L	GF	GA	GD	Win %	Started round	Final position / round	First match	Last match
Ligue 1	30	8	14	8	20	24	−4	26.67	—N/a	11th	20 August 2016	14 June 2017
Algerian Cup	4	3	1	0	8	1	+7	75.00	Round of 64	Quarter-finals	25 November 2016	1 April 2017
Confederation Cup	6	2	2	2	5	5	+0	33.33	First round	Play-off round	10 February 2017	16 April 2017
Total	0	0	0	0	0	0	+0	—				

== League table ==
Pos	Team	Pld	W	D	L	GF	GA	GD	Pts
9	CS Constantine	30	10	9	11	34	33	+1	39 (Note: DRB Tadjenanet ahead of CS Constantine on head-to-head record: CSC–DRB 4–2, DRB–CSC 1–0.)
10	DRB Tadjenanet	30	10	9	11	33	32	+1	39
11	JS Kabylie	30	8	14	8	20	24	−4	38 (Note: JS Kabylie ahead of Olympique de Médéa on head-to-head record: JSK–OMM 0–1, OMM–JSK 1–2.)
12	Olympique de Médéa	30	10	8	12	32	40	−8	38
13	USM El Harrach	30	7	15	8	15	21	−6	36 (Note: RC Relizane ahead of USM El Harrach on head-to-head record: RCR–UEH 0–0, UEH–RCR 0–0 however goal difference in the first leg RCR (−8) UEH (−1).)

Updated to match(es) played on 14 June 2017. Source: DZFoot
Rules for classification: 1) points; 2) head-to-head points; 3) head-to-head goal difference; 4) goal difference; 5) total goals; 6) fairplay ranking; 7) playoff.

=== Results summary ===
Overall								Home						Away					
Pld	W	D	L	GF	GA	GD	Pts	W	D	L	GF	GA	GD	W	D	L	GF	GA	GD
30	8	14	8	20	24	−4	38	4	10	1	11	8	+3	4	4	7	9	16	−7

Last updated: 30 January 2016.
Source: Competitive matches

=== Results by round ===
Round	1	2	3	4	5	6	7	8	9	10	11	12	13	14	15	16	17	18	19	20	21	22	23	24	25	26	27	28	29	30
Ground	H	A	H	A	H	A	H	A	H	A	H	A	H	A	H	A	H	A	H	A	H	A	H	A	H	A	H	A	H	A
Result	D	W	D	D	D	L	D	L	D	W	D	L	L	L	W	D	W	L	D	W	D	L	D	D	D	L	W	W	W	D
Position	9	6	6	7	8	9	8	11	12	8	9	11	14	14	12	12	11	11	12	11	11	11	12	11	11	14	12	12	9	11

Updated to match(es) played on 30 January 2016. Source: Competitive matches
A = Away; H = Home; W = Win; D = Draw; L = Loss

=== Matches ===
Win Draw Loss

20 August 2016 Round 1	JS Kabylie	0–0	MC Alger	Tizi Ouzou
19:00		Soccerway report Live TV: TV Tamazight 4		Stadium: Stade 1er Novembre 1954; Referee: Abderrezzak Arab

26 August 2016 Round 2	NA Hussein Dey	0–1	JS Kabylie	Mohamed Belouizdad
17:45		Report; Live TV: EPTV Terrestre / TV Tamazight 4	22' Mebarki	Stadium: Stade 20 Août 1955; Referee: Mustapha Ghorbal

10 September 2016 Round 3	JS Kabylie	0–0	USM El Harrach	Tizi Ouzou
19:00		Report; Live TV: None		Stadium: Stade 1er Novembre 1954; Referee: Rafik Achouri

17 September 2016 Round 4	ES Sétif	0–0	JS Kabylie	Sétif
17:45		Report; Live TV: Algérie 3 / Canal Algérie		Stadium: Stade 8 Mai 1945; Referee: Farouk Mial

24 September 2016 Round 5	JS Kabylie	1–1	CA Batna	Tizi Ouzou
17:45	Aiboud 30'	Report; Live TV: TV Tamazight 4	26' Aribi	Stadium: Stade 1er Novembre 1954; Referee: Mustapha Bessiri

1 October 2016 Round 6	JS Saoura	1–0	JS Kabylie	Béchar
19:00	Zaidi 60'	Report; Live TV: None		Stadium: Stade 20 Août 1955; Referee: Mohamed Amine Bachir

15 October 2016 Round 7	JS Kabylie	1–1	MO Béjaïa	Tizi Ouzou
17:00	Aiboud 20'	Report; Live TV: Algérie 3 / TV Tamazight 4	60' Rahal	Stadium: Stade 1er Novembre 1954; Referee: Mehdi Abid Charef

22 October 2016 Round 8	USM Alger	2–1	JS Kabylie	Bologhine
17:00	Guessan 31'; Meftah 81' (pen.)	Report; Live TV: Algérie 3 / TV Tamazight 4	90+3' Rial	Stadium: Stade Omar Hamadi; Referee: Redouane Necib

29 October 2016 Round 9	JS Kabylie	1–1	MC Oran	Tizi Ouzou
17:00	Ferhani 90'	Report; Live TV: None	23' Souibaah	Stadium: Stade 1er Novembre 1954; Referee: Rafik Achouri

4 November 2016 Round 10	CS Constantine	0–1	JS Kabylie	Constantine
16:00		Report; Live TV: TV Tamazight 4 / Algérie 3	90+3' Boulaouidet	Stadium: Stade Mohamed Hamlaoui; Referee: Lotfi Bekouassa

10 November 2016 Round 11	JS Kabylie	1–1	DRB Tadjenanet	Tizi Ouzou
17:00	Mebarki 90+4'	Report; Live TV: TV Tamazight 4 / Canal Algérie	40' Chibane	Stadium: Stade 1er Novembre 1954; Referee: Mustapha Ghorbal

19 November 2016 Round 12	RC Relizane	3–1	JS Kabylie	Relizane
15:00	Tebbi 31'; Benayad 41'; Remache 65'	Report; Live TV: TV Tamazight 4	57' Boulaouidet	Stadium: Stade Tahar Zoughari; Referee: Lotfi Bekouassa

3 December 2016 Round 13	JS Kabylie	0–1	Olympique de Médéa	Tizi Ouzou
16:00		Report; Live TV: Canal Algérie	23' Gharbi	Stadium: November 1, 1954 Stadium; Referee: Said Aouina

10 December 2016 Round 14	USM Bel-Abbès	2–0	JS Kabylie	Sidi Bel Abbès
16:00	Benabderahmane 60'; Balegh 78'	Report; Live TV: TV Tamazight 4		Stadium: Stade 24 Fevrier 1956; Referee: Lotfi Bekouassa

24 December 2016 Round 15	JS Kabylie	1–0	CR Belouizdad	Tizi Ouzou
16:00	Boulaouidet 43'	Report; Live TV: Algérie 3		Stadium: November 1, 1954 Stadium; Referee: Ahmed Bouzrar

25 March 2017 Round 16	MC Alger	1–1	JS Kabylie	Algiers
16:00; Match rescheduled due to share some of their players in the African Cup and World Cup military	Derrardja 77'	Report; Live TV: Algérie 3 / Al-Kass Sports	83' Boulaouidet	Stadium: July 5, 1962 Stadium; Referee: Said Aouina

5 April 2017 Round 17	JS Kabylie	2–1	NA Hussein Dey	Tizi Ouzou
16:00; Match rescheduled due to share some of their players in the African Cup and World Cup military	Rial 37'; Baïteche 54'	Report; Live TV: None	16' Ardji	Stadium: November 1, 1954 Stadium; Attendance: 0 (close doors); Referee: Mohamed Saïdi

2 February 2017 Round 18	USM El Harrach	1–0	JS Kabylie	El Harrach
15:00	Dahar 13' (pen.)	Report; Live TV: None		Stadium: November 1, 1954 Stadium; Referee: Rafik Achouri

7 February 2017 Round 19	JS Kabylie	1–1	ES Sétif	Tizi Ouzou
16:00	Boulaouidet 10' (pen.)	Report; Live TV: EPTV Terrestre / TV Tamazight 4	45' Ziti	Stadium: November 1, 1954 Stadium; Referee: Lotfi Bekouassa

21 April 2017 Round 20	CA Batna	0–1	JS Kabylie	Batna
16:00; Match rescheduled due to JS Kabylie competing in the 2017 CAF Confederation Cup		Report; Live TV: None	50' Guemroud	Stadium: Mustapha Seffouhi Stadium; Referee: Abderrezzak Arab

25 February 2017 Round 21	JS Kabylie	0–0	JS Saoura	Tizi Ouzou
16:00		Report; Live TV: Algérie 3		Stadium: November 1, 1954 Stadium; Referee: Lahlou Benbraham

3 March 2017 Round 22	MO Béjaïa	3–0	JS Kabylie	Béjaïa
16:00	Belkacemi 56'; Benmelouka 67'; Berchiche 87' (o.g.)	Report; Live TV: None		Stadium: Maghrebi Unity Stadium; Attendance: 0 (close doors); Referee: Lotfi Bekouassa

25 April 2017 Round 23	JS Kabylie	1–1	USM Alger	Tizi Ouzou
18:00	Zerguine 35'	Report; Live TV: Al-Kass Sports / TV Tamazight 4	43' Benyahia	Stadium: November 1, 1954 Stadium; Referee: Mehdi Abid Charef

29 April 2017 Round 24	MC Oran	0–0	JS Kabylie	Oran
17:00		Report; Live TV: None		Stadium: Ahmed Zabana Stadium; Attendance: 0 (close doors); Referee: Lotfi Bekouassa

6 May 2017 Round 25	JS Kabylie	0–0	CS Constantine	Tizi Ouzou
16:00		Report; Live TV: Algérie 3		Stadium: November 1, 1954 Stadium; Referee: Said Aouina

13 May 2017 Round 26	DRB Tadjenanet	1–0	JS Kabylie	Tadjenanet
16:00	Terbah 61'	Report; Live TV: None		Stadium: Lahoua Smaïl Stadium; Referee: Mohamed Saïdi

20 May 2017 Round 27	JS Kabylie	1–0	RC Relizane	Tizi Ouzou
18:00	Boulaouidet 11'	Report; Live TV: None		Stadium: November 1, 1954 Stadium; Referee: Rafik Achouri

7 June 2017 Round 28	Olympique de Médéa	1–2	JS Kabylie	Médéa
17:00	Rachedi 54'	Report; Live TV: None	3' Boulaouidet; 56' (pen.) Guemroud	Stadium: Stade Imam Lyes de Médéa; Referee: Mustapha Ghorbal

10 June 2017 Round 29	JS Kabylie	1–0	USM Bel-Abbès	Tizi Ouzou
17:00	Mesbahi 36'	Report; Live TV: TV Tamazight 4		Stadium: November 1, 1954 Stadium; Referee: Lotfi Bekouassa

14 June 2017 Round 30	CR Belouizdad	1–1	JS Kabylie	Mohamed Belouizdad
17:00	Bellaili 77'	Report; Live TV: None	7' Benaldjia	Stadium: August 20, 1955 Stadium; Referee: Farid Bahloul

== Algerian Cup ==
25 November 2016 Round of 64	WAN Tissemsilt	0–5	JS Kabylie	Tissemsilt
15:00		Live TV: None	Herbache 6' (pen.); Radouani 24'; Boulaouidet 43', 55', 80' (pen.)	Stadium: Stade Djillali Bounaâma; Referee: Benabdellah, Miraoui, Belhadj

16 December 2016 Round of 32	MB Rouissat	1–2 (a.e.t.)	JS Kabylie	Ouargla
14:45	Tahra 85'	Live TV: None	Redouani 77'; Boulaouidet 100'	Stadium: Olympic Ouargla Stadium; Referee: Achouri, Tamen, Benhamouda

27 December 2016 Round of 16	JS Kabylie	1–0	Nasr El-Fedjoudj	Tizi Ouzou
17:00	Boulaouidet 84'	Live TV: None		Stadium: November 1, 1954 Stadium; Referee: Boukouassa, Tazerout, Slimani

1 April 2017 Quarter-finals	MC Alger	0–0 (a.e.t.) (3–1 p)	JS Kabylie	Algiers
16:00		Live TV: Canal Algérie		Stadium: July 5, 1962 Stadium; Referee: Ghorbal, Zerhouni, Benali

== Confederation Cup ==
=== Preliminary round ===
10 February 2017 first leg	Monrovia Club Breweries (Liberia)	3–0	(Algeria) JS Kabylie	Monrovia
16:00 UTC+0	Mulbah 58'; Sarkoh 79'; Andrews 90+1'	Report		Stadium: Antoinette Tubman Stadium; Referee: Baba Leno (Guinea)

19 February 2017 Second leg	JS Kabylie (Algeria)	4–0	(Liberia) Monrovia Club Breweries	Tizi Ouzou
18:00 UTC+1	Boulaouidet 23' (pen.), 62'; Berchiche 27'; Mebarki 73'	Report		Stadium: Stade du 1er Novembre 1954; Referee: Nasrallah Jaouadi (Tunisia)

=== First round ===
11 March 2017 first leg	Étoile du Congo (Republic of the Congo)	0–0	(Algeria) JS Kabylie	Brazzaville
15:30 UTC+1		Report		Stadium: Stade Alphonse Massemba-Débat; Referee: Jean Marc Ganamandji (Central African Republic)

18 March 2017 Second leg	JS Kabylie (Algeria)	1–0	(Republic of the Congo) Étoile du Congo	Tizi Ouzou
18:00 UTC+1	Boulaouidet 90'	Report		Stadium: Stade du 1er Novembre 1954; Referee: Mohamed El Hanafy (Egypt)

=== Play-off round ===
9 April 2017 first leg	TP Mazembe (Democratic Republic of the Congo)	2–0	(Algeria) JS Kabylie	Lubumbashi
15:30 UTC+2	Sinkala 11'; Coulibaly 90'	Report		Stadium: Stade TP Mazembe; Referee: Thierry Nkurunziza (Burundi)

16 April 2017 Second leg	JS Kabylie (Algeria)	0–0	(Democratic Republic of the Congo) TP Mazembe	Tizi Ouzou
18:00 UTC+1		Report		Stadium: Stade du 1er Novembre 1954; Referee: Ali Lemghaifry (Mauritania)

== Squad information ==
=== Playing statistics ===
No.	Pos	Nat	Player	Total		Ligue 1		Algerian Cup		Confederation Cup	
No.	Pos	Nat	Player	Apps	Goals	Apps	Goals	Apps	Goals	Apps	Goals
30	GK	(Algeria) ALG	Malik Asselah	36	0	28	0	3	0	5	0
16	GK	(Algeria) ALG	Abderrahmane Boultif	4	0	2	0	1	0	1	0
4	DF	(Algeria) ALG	Koceila Berchiche	35	1	28	0	2	0	5	1
8	DF	(Algeria) ALG	Houari Ferhani	35	1	27	1	4	0	4	0
25	DF	(Algeria) ALG	Sofiane Khelili	4	0	3	0	0	0	1	0
3	DF	(Algeria) ALG	Lamine Medjkane	15	0	10	0	2	0	3	0
38	DF	(Algeria) ALG	Makhlouf Naït Rabah	1	0	1	0	0	0	0	0
35	DF	(Algeria) ALG	Juba Oukaci	3	0	3	0	0	0	0	0
2	DF	(Algeria) ALG	Saâdi Radouani	39	2	29	0	4	2	6	0
5	DF	(Algeria) ALG	Ali Rial	35	2	27	2	3	0	5	0
29	DF	(Algeria) ALG	Touhami Sebie	5	0	2	0	3	0	0	0
24	DF	(Algeria) ALG	Bilal Tizi Bouali	8	0	4	0	1	0	3	0
10	MF	(Algeria) ALG	Samir Aiboud	25	2	19	2	2	0	4	0
15	MF	(Algeria) ALG	Karim Baïteche	13	1	8	1	0	0	5	0
7	MF	(Algeria) ALG	Mehdi Benaldjia	22	1	15	1	1	0	6	0
19	MF	(Algeria) ALG	Adel Djerrar	23	0	15	0	3	0	5	0
22	MF	(Algeria) ALG	Mohamed Guemroud	20	2	13	2	2	0	5	0
21	MF	(Algeria) ALG	Malik Raiah	31	0	27	0	1	0	3	0
23	MF	(Algeria) ALG	Nassim Yettou	37	0	27	0	4	0	6	0
36	FW	(Algeria) ALG	Nasr-Eddine Benabbou	9	0	5	0	3	0	1	0
11	FW	(Algeria) ALG	Mohamed Boulaouidet	36	15	27	7	4	5	5	3
9	FW	(Algeria) ALG	Thomas Izerghouf	13	0	8	0	1	0	4	0
18	FW	(Algeria) ALG	Billel Mebarki	26	3	21	2	3	0	2	1
52	FW	(Algeria) ALG	Ahmed Mesbahi	3	1	3	1	0	0	0	0
44	FW	(Algeria) ALG	Anis Renaï	16	0	13	0	3	0	0	0
20	FW	(Algeria) ALG	Massinissa Tafni	4	0	3	0	1	0	0	0
6	FW	(Algeria) ALG	Youcef Zergune	15	1	11	1	0	0	4	0
Players transferred out during the season
	DF	(Algeria) ALG	Nour El Islam Salah	2	0	1	0	1	0	0	0
	FW	(Algeria) ALG	Abdelmalek Ziaya	12	0	12	0	0	0	0	0
	MF	(Algeria) ALG	Mohamed Benkablia	12	0	12	0	0	0	0	0
	MF	(Algeria) ALG	Bilel Herbache	9	1	8	0	1	1	0	0
	MF	(Algeria) ALG	Nazim Si Salem	4	0	3	0	1	0	0	0

Last updated: 11 June 2017
Source: fr.soccerway.com

=== Goalscorers ===
Includes all competitive matches. The list is sorted alphabetically by surname when total goals are equal.

No.	Nat.	Player	Pos.	L 1	AC	CC 3	TOTAL
11	(Algeria)	Mohamed Boulaouidet	FW	7	5	3	15
18	(Algeria)	Billel Mebarki	FW	2	0	1	3
2	(Algeria)	Saâdi Radouani	DF	0	2	0	2
5	(Algeria)	Ali Rial	DF	2	0	0	2
10	(Algeria)	Samir Aiboud	MF	2	0	0	2
22	(Algeria)	Mohamed Guemroud	MF	2	0	0	2
4	(Algeria)	Koceila Berchiche	DF	0	0	1	1
8	(Algeria)	Houari Ferhani	DF	1	0	0	1
15	(Algeria)	Karim Baïteche	MF	1	0	0	1
7	(Algeria)	Mehdi Benaldjia	MF	1	0	0	1
	(Algeria)	Bilel Herbache	MF	0	1	0	1
52	(Algeria)	Ahmed Mesbahi	FW	1	0	0	1
6	(Algeria)	Youcef Zergune	FW	1	0	0	1
Own Goals				0	0	0	0
Totals				20	8	5	33

== Squad list ==
As of 15 January 2017

Note: Flags indicate national team as defined under FIFA eligibility rules; some limited exceptions apply. Players may hold more than one non-FIFA nationality.

No.	Pos.	Nation	Player
1	GK	ALG	Massinissa Messaoudi
2	DF	ALG	Saâdi Radouani
3	DF	ALG	Lamine Medjkane
4	DF	ALG	Koceila Berchiche
5	DF	ALG	Ali Rial (captain)
6	MF	ALG	Youcef Zergune
7	MF	ALG	Mehdi Benaldjia
8	DF	ALG	Houari Ferhani
9	FW	ALG	Thomas Izerghouf
10	MF	ALG	Samir Aiboud
11	FW	ALG	Mohamed Boulaouidet

No.	Pos.	Nation	Player
15	MF	ALG	Karim Baïteche
16	GK	ALG	Abderrahmane Boultif
18	MF	ALG	Billel Mebarki
19	MF	ALG	Adel Djerrar
20	MF	ALG	Massinissa Tafni
21	MF	ALG	Malik Raiah
22	MF	ALG	Mohamed Guemroud
23	MF	ALG	Nassim Yettou
25	DF	ALG	Sofiane Khelili
29	DF	ALG	Touhami Sebie
30	GK	ALG	Malik Asselah

== Transfers ==
=== In ===
No.	Pos.	Nation	Player
2	DF	ALG	Saadi Redouani (from (Algeria) USM Alger)
30	GK	ALG	Malik Asselah (from (Algeria) CR Belouizdad)
26	FW	ALG	Abdelmalek Ziaya (from (Algeria) ES Sétif)
29	DF	ALG	Touhami Sebie (from (Algeria) JS Saoura)
—	MF	ALG	Nassim Yettou (from (Algeria) RC Arbaâ)
—	MF	ALG	Adel Djerrar (from (Algeria) RC Relizane)
—	MF	ALG	Bilel Herbache (from (Algeria) ASM Oran)
—	MF	ALG	Mohamed Benkablia (from (Algeria) ASM Oran)
—	DF	ALG	Islam Salah (from (Algeria) ASO Chlef)
—	DF	ALG	Sofiane Khelili (from (Algeria) CR Belouizdad)

No.	Pos.	Nation	Player
—	MF	ALG	Karim Baiteche (from (Algeria) CS Constantine)
—	FW	ALG	Nasereddine El Bahari (from (Algeria) OM Arzew)
—	FW	ALG	Mehdi Benaldjia (from (Algeria) JS Saoura)
—	FW	ALG	Youcef Zerguine (from (Algeria) USM Blida)
—	FW	ALG	Thomas Izerghouf (Unattached)

=== Out ===
No.	Pos.	Nation	Player
25	MF	ALG	Rachid Ferrahi (to (Algeria) MC Oran)
30	GK	ALG	Azzedine Doukha (to (Algeria) NA Hussein Dey)
7	FW	ALG	Saïd Ferguène (to (Algeria) NA Hussein Dey)
14	MF	ALG	Hocine Harrouche (to (Algeria) NA Hussein Dey)
24	DF	ALG	Mohamed Khoutir Ziti (to (Algeria) ES Sétif)

No.	Pos.	Nation	Player
29	MF	ALG	Kamel Yesli (to (Algeria) MO Béjaïa)
8	MF	ALG	Faouzi Rahal (to (Algeria) MO Béjaïa)
20	FW	BFA	Banou Diawara (to (Egypt) Smouha SC)
28	DF	BFA	Patrick Malo (to (Egypt) Smouha SC)
