= 2018–19 ES Sétif season =

ES Sétif
2018–19 season
- Chairman: Hassan Hammar
- Head coach: Rachid Taoussi (from 1 June 2018) (until 23 November 2018); Noureddine Zekri (from 24 November 2018) (from 5 February 2019); Nabil Neghiz (from 7 February 2019)
- Stadium: Stade 8 Mai 1945
- Ligue 1: 5th
- Algerian Cup: Semi-final
- Champions League: Semi-finals
- Club Championship: Second round
- Top goalscorer: League: Habib Bouguelmouna (9); All: Habib Bouguelmouna (14)
Home colours	Away colours

In the 2018–19 season, ES Sétif competed in Ligue 1 for the 49th season. It was their 23rd consecutive season in the top flight of Algerian football. They also competed in the Champions League, Club Championship and the Algerian Cup.

== Squad list ==
Players and squad numbers last updated on 18 November 2010.
Note: Flags indicate national team as has been defined under FIFA eligibility rules. Players may hold more than one non-FIFA nationality.

No.	Nat.	Position	Name	Date of Birth (Age)	Signed from
Goalkeepers
Defenders
Midfielders
Forwards

== Competitions ==
=== Overview ===
Competition	Record								Started round	Final position / round	First match	Last match
Competition	G	W	D	L	GF	GA	GD	Win %	Started round	Final position / round	First match	Last match
Ligue 1	30	13	6	11	34	24	+10	43.33	—N/a	5th	11 August 2018	26 May 2019
Algerian Cup	7	5	0	2	11	5	+6	71.43	Round of 64	Semi-final	19 December 2018	25 April 2019
Champions League	8	4	3	1	10	12	−2	50.00	Group stage	Semi-final	17 July 2018	23 October 2018
Club Championship	4	1	1	2	3	4	−1	25.00	First round	Second round	31 July 2018	4 December 2018
Total	49	23	10	16	58	45	+13	46.94				

Updated to match played 26 May 2019
Source: Competitions

== League table ==
Pos	Team	Pld	W	D	L	GF	GA	GD	Pts	Qualification or relegation
3	Paradou AC	30	14	6	10	38	24	+14	48	Qualification for Confederation Cup
4	JS Saoura	30	13	8	9	33	22	+11	47	Qualification for Arab Club Champions Cup
5	ES Sétif	30	13	6	11	34	24	+10	45	
6	MC Alger	30	11	10	9	35	36	−1	43	Qualification for Arab Club Champions Cup
7	CS Constantine	30	10	10	10	30	24	+6	40	Qualification for Arab Club Champions Cup

Source: DZFoot
Rules for classification: 1) points; 2) head-to-head points; 3) head-to-head goal difference; 4) goal difference; 5) total goals; 6) fairplay ranking; 7) playoff.

=== Results summary ===
Overall								Home						Away					
Pld	W	D	L	GF	GA	GD	Pts	W	D	L	GF	GA	GD	W	D	L	GF	GA	GD
30	13	6	11	34	24	+10	45	9	3	3	25	9	+16	4	3	8	9	15	−6

Last updated: 28 May 2019.
Source: Competitive matches

=== Results by round ===
Round	1	2	3	4	5	6	7	8	9	10	11	12	13	14	15	16	17	18	19	20	21	22	23	24	25	26	27	28	29	30
Ground	H	A	H	A	H	H	A	H	A	H	A	H	A	H	A	A	H	A	H	A	A	H	A	H	A	H	A	H	A	H
Result	W	L	D	W	W	D	D	L	W	W	W	L	W	L	L	L	W	L	W	L	L	W	L	W	D	D	D	W	L	W
Position	1	6	7	5	2	3	4	5	4	3	3	3	2	3	3	3	3	5	3	7	7	6	7	5	6	5	5	4	5	5

Updated to match(es) played on 16 May 2019. Source: Competitive matches
A = Away; H = Home; W = Win; D = Draw; L = Loss

=== Matches ===
Win Draw Loss

11 August 2018 Round 1	ES Sétif	3–0	USM Bel Abbès	Sétif
20:00	Rebiai 29'; Ghacha 48'; Djabou 57'	Soccerway report		Stadium: Stade 8 Mai 1945; Referee: Redouane Necib

25 August 2018 Round 2	AS Ain M'lila	1–0	ES Sétif	Batna
17:00	Benchaira 44'	Soccerway report		Stadium: November 1, 1954 Stadium; Attendance: 0 (close doors); Referee: Missoum Benabdellah

1 September 2018 Round 4	MC Alger	0–1	ES Sétif	Algiers
21:00		Soccerway report	Djahnit 51'	Stadium: July 5, 1962 Stadium; Referee: Mustapha Bessiri

4 September 2018 Round 3	ES Sétif	1–1	Paradou AC	Sétif
21:00	Bouguelmouna 88' (pen.)	Soccerway report	Naidji 60'	Stadium: Stade 8 Mai 1945; Referee: Said Aouina

10 September 2018 Round 5	ES Sétif	3–2	CR Belouizdad	Sétif
19:00	Lakroum 10' (pen.); Bouguelmouna 84' (pen.), 90+6'	Soccerway report	Bourenane 28', 43'	Stadium: Stade 8 Mai 1945; Referee: Ahmed Bouzrar

17 September 2018 Round 6	ES Sétif	1–1	DRB Tadjenanet	Sétif
19:00	Bakir 68'	Soccerway report	Hammouche 74'	Stadium: Stade 8 Mai 1945; Referee: Hamza Bouslimani

27 September 2018 Round 8	ES Sétif	0–1	JS Kabylie	Sétif
19:00		Soccerway report	Benyoucef 76'	Stadium: Stade 8 Mai 1945; Referee: Mehdi Abid Charef

7 October 2018 Round 9	MC Oran	0–1	ES Sétif	Oran
17:00		Soccerway report	Chibane 84' (o.g.)	Stadium: Ahmed Zabana Stadium; Referee: Lyés Bekouassa

11 October 2018 Round 10	ES Sétif	2–0	CS Constantine	Sétif
17:45	Rebiai 48', 61'	Soccerway report		Stadium: Stade 8 Mai 1945; Attendance: 0 (close doors); Referee: Mustapha Bessiri

15 October 2018 Round 7	Olympique de Médéa	2–2	ES Sétif	Médéa
15:00	Sameur 22'; Khaldi 88'	Soccerway report	Aiboud 28' (pen.); Lakroum 70'	Stadium: Stade Imam Lyes de Médéa; Referee: Mohamed Saïdi

5 November 2018 Round 13	CA Bordj Bou Arreridj	1–2	ES Sétif	Bordj Bou Arréridj
16:00	Athmani 41'	Soccerway report	Djahnit 74' (pen.); Lakroum 88'	Stadium: Stade 20 Août 1955; Attendance: 0 (close doors); Referee: Lyés Bekouassa

10 November 2018 Round 14	ES Sétif	0–1	JS Saoura	Sétif
17:00		Soccerway report	Hammia 32'	Stadium: Stade 8 Mai 1945; Referee: Ahmed Bouzrar

16 November 2018 Round 12	ES Sétif	0–1	NA Hussein Dey	Sétif
18:00		Soccerway report	Alati 15'	Stadium: Stade 8 Mai 1945; Referee: Redouane Necib

22 November 2018 Round 15	MO Béjaïa	1–0	ES Sétif	Béjaïa
18:00	Aibout 62'	Soccerway report		Stadium: Stade de l'Unité Maghrébine; Referee: Hamza Bouslimani

29 November 2018 Round 11	USM Alger	0–1	ES Sétif	Bologhine
17:45		Soccerway report	Bedrane 15'	Stadium: Omar Hamadi Stadium; Referee: Mustapha Bessiri

4 January 2019 Round 16	USM Bel Abbès	2–0	ES Sétif	Sidi Bel Abbès
16:00	Benayad 22', 45'	Soccerway report		Stadium: Stade 24 Fevrier 1956; Referee: Farouk Mial

11 January 2019 (Note: The match was originally to be played on 11 January 2019, 16:00, but it was postponed due to heavy snowfall.) Round 17	ES Sétif	–	AS Ain M'lila	Sétif
16:00		Soccerway report		Stadium: Stade 8 Mai 1945; Referee: Mustapha Bessiri

18 January 2019 Round 18	Paradou AC	1–1	ES Sétif	Bologhine
17:45	Naidji 77'	Soccerway report		Stadium: Omar Hamadi Stadium; Referee: Mustapha Bessiri

26 January 2019 (Note: The match was originally to be played on 26 January 2019, 16:00, but it was postponed due to heavy snowfall.) Round 19	ES Sétif	–	MC Alger	Sétif
16:00		Soccerway report		Stadium: Stade 8 Mai 1945; Referee: Farouk Mial

30 January 2019 Round 17	ES Sétif	4–0	AS Ain M'lila	Sétif
16:00	Djabou 17', 33', 84'; Bouguelmouna 81'	Soccerway report		Stadium: Stade 8 Mai 1945; Referee: Merzoug Brahimi

5 February 2019 Round 20	CR Belouizdad	1–0	ES Sétif	Belouizdad
15:00	Bouchar 43'	Soccerway report		Stadium: Stade 20 Août 1955; Referee: Abderrezzak Arab

9 February 2019 Round 21	DRB Tadjenanet	2–0	ES Sétif	Tadjenanet
17:45	Bensaha 26'; Ounnas 30'	Soccerway report		Stadium: Lahoua Smaïl Stadium; Referee: Lyés Bekouassa

13 February 2019 Round 22	ES Sétif	1–0	Olympique de Médéa	Sétif
17:00	Bouguelmouna 9'	Soccerway report		Stadium: Stade 8 Mai 1945; Referee: Ali Nader

2 March 2019 Round 23	JS Kabylie	1–0	ES Sétif	Tizi Ouzou
17:45	Abdul Razak 59'	Soccerway report		Stadium: November 1, 1954 Stadium; Referee: Said Aouina

9 March 2019 Round 19	ES Sétif	2–0	MC Alger	Sétif
17:45	Bouguelmouna 30' (pen.), 83'	Soccerway report		Stadium: Stade 8 Mai 1945; Referee: Farouk Mial

17 March 2019 Round 24	ES Sétif	4–1	MC Oran	Sétif
17:45	Djahnit 28'; Bouguelmouna 42', 59'; Radouani 79'	Soccerway report	Mahammedi 48'	Stadium: Stade 8 Mai 1945; Attendance: 0 (close doors); Referee: Hamza Bouslimani

2 April 2019 Round 25	CS Constantine	1–1	ES Sétif	Constantine
17:00	Djabout 64'	Soccerway report	Bakir 80'	Stadium: Stade Mohamed Hamlaoui; Referee: Mustapha Bessiri

21 April 2019 Round 26	ES Sétif	1–1	USM Alger	Sétif
16:00	Radouani 74'	Soccerway report Live TV: Canal Algérie	Ellafi 42'	Stadium: Stade 8 Mai 1945; Referee: Mohamed Saïdi

11 May 2019 Round 27	NA Hussein Dey	0–0	ES Sétif	Belouizdad
16:00		Soccerway report		Stadium: Stade 20 Août 1955; Referee: Nabil Boukhalfa

16 May 2019 Round 28	ES Sétif	1–0	CA Bordj Bou Arreridj	Sétif
22:30	Deghmoum 83'	Soccerway report		Stadium: Stade 8 Mai 1945; Referee: Missoum Benabdellah

21 May 2019 Round 29	JS Saoura	2–1	ES Sétif	Béchar
22:30	Zaidi 15'; Hammia 45+2'	Soccerway report	Bakir 45+1' (pen.)	Stadium: Stade 20 Août 1955; Referee: Lyés Bekouassa

26 May 2019 Round 30	ES Sétif	2–0	MO Béjaïa	Sétif
22:30	Aiboud 55'; Draoui 82'	Soccerway report		Stadium: Stade 8 Mai 1945; Referee: Lotfi Bekouassa

== Algerian Cup ==
19 December 2018 Round of 64	ES Sétif	1–0	Olympique de Médéa	Sétif
18:00	Banouh 10'			Stadium: Stade 8 Mai 1945; Referee: Lyés Bekouassa

15 January 2019 Round of 32	A Bou Saâda	0–1	ES Sétif	Bou Saâda
14:00			Bedrane 7'	Stadium: Mokhtar Abdellatif Stadium; Referee: Abderrezzak Arab

22 January 2019 Round of 16	ES Sétif	3–1	USM Alger	Sétif
17:00	Bedrane 3'; Ferhani 51'; Djabou 79'	Live TV: EPTV Terrestre	Cherifi 48' (pen.)	Stadium: Stade 8 Mai 1945; Referee: Redouane Necib

19 February 2019 QF 1st leg	USM Annaba	2–0	ES Sétif	Annaba
15:00	Sahbi 18'; Rebiai 58' (pen.)			Stadium: May 19, 1956 Stadium; Referee: Mohamed Saidi

27 February 2019 QF 2nd leg	ES Sétif	4–0	USM Annaba	Sétif
17:00	Bouguelmouna 30', 71'; Bakir 73'; Ghacha 90+3'			Stadium: 8 May 1945 Stadium; Referee: Nabil Boukhalfa

16 April 2019 SF 1st leg	ES Sétif	1–2	JSM Béjaïa	Sétif
17:00	Djahnit 60'		Niati 70'; Baiteche 89'	Stadium: 8 May 1945 Stadium; Referee: Lotfi Bekouassa

25 April 2019 SF 2nd leg	JSM Béjaïa	0–1	ES Sétif	Béjaïa
17:00			Samir Aiboud 14'	Stadium: Stade de l'Unité Maghrébine; Attendance: 18,000; Referee: Hamza Bouslimani

== Champions League ==
=== Group stage ===
==== Group B ====
Pos	Team	Pld	W	D	L	GF	GA	GD	Pts	Qualification	TPM	ESS	DHJ	MCA
1	(Democratic Republic of the Congo) TP Mazembe	6	3	3	0	10	4	+6	12	Quarter-finals	—	4–1	1–1	1–0
2	(Algeria) ES Sétif	6	2	2	2	7	9	−2	8	Quarter-finals	1–1	—	2–1	0–1
3	(Morocco) Difaâ El Jadidi	6	1	3	2	6	7	−1	6		0–2	1–1	—	2–0
4	(Algeria) MC Alger	6	1	2	3	4	7	−3	5		1–1	1–2	1–1	—

Source: CAF

17 July 2018 3	ES Sétif (Algeria)	2–1	(Morocco) Difaâ El Jadidi	Sétif
20:00 UTC+1	Bouguelmouna 21'; Ghacha 89'	Report	Bamaamar 4'	Stadium: Stade du 8-Mai-1945; Referee: Bakary Gassama (Gambia)

27 July 2018 4	Difaâ El Jadidi (Morocco)	1–1	(Algeria) ES Sétif	El Jadida
20:00 UTC+1	Msuva 23'	Report	Bouguelmouna 32' (pen.)	Stadium: Stade El Abdi; Referee: Ali Lemghaifry (Mauritania)

17 August 2018 5	ES Sétif (Algeria)	1–1	(Democratic Republic of the Congo) TP Mazembe	Sétif
20:00 UTC+1	Bakir 59'	Report	Chongo 76'	Stadium: Stade du 8-Mai-1945; Referee: Maguette N'Diaye (Senegal)

28 August 2018 6	MC Alger (Algeria)	1–2	(Algeria) ES Sétif	Algiers
14:00 UTC+1	Derrardja 41'	Report	Djahnit 5'; Bouguelmouna 27'	Stadium: Stade du 5-Juillet-1962; Referee: Bamlak Tessema Weyesa (Ethiopia)

=== Knockout stage ===
==== Quarter-finals ====
14 September 2018 First leg	ES Sétif (Algeria)	1–0	(Morocco) Wydad Casablanca	Sétif
20:00 UTC+1	Diomande 16'	Report		Stadium: Stade du 8-Mai-1945; Attendance: 23,000; Referee: Eric Otogo-Castane (Gabon)

21 September 2018 Second leg	Wydad Casablanca (Morocco)	0–0	(Algeria) ES Sétif	Casablanca
20:00 UTC+1		Report		Stadium: Stade Mohammed V Referee: Bernard Camille (Seychelles)

==== Semi-finals ====
2 October 2018 First leg	Al-Ahly (Egypt)	2–0	(Algeria) ES Sétif	Cairo
21:00 UTC+2	Soliman 23'; Mohareb 41'	Report		Stadium: Al Salam Stadium; Referee: Bamlak Tessema Weyesa (Ethiopia)

23 October 2018 Second leg	ES Sétif (Algeria)	2–1	(Egypt) Al-Ahly	Sétif
20:00 UTC+1	Bakir 67'; Ghacha 72'	Report	Soliman 61'	Stadium: Stade du 8-Mai-1945; Referee: Victor Gomes (South Africa)

== Club Championship Cup ==
=== First round ===
31 July 2018 First leg	Al-Ain (United Arab Emirates)	1–2	(Algeria) ES Sétif	Zagreb
17:00 CEST	Diaky 21' (pen.)	Report	Djabou 40', 81'	Stadium: Stadion Maksimir; Referee: Turki Al-Khudair (Saudi Arabia)

4 August 2018 Second leg	ES Sétif (Algeria)	0–1	(United Arab Emirates) Al-Ain	Zagreb
19:00 CEST			Diaky 45'	Stadium: Stadion Maksimir; Referee: Redouane Jiyed (Morocco)

=== Second round ===
28 October 2018 First leg	ES Sétif (Algeria)	0–1	(Saudi Arabia) Al-Ahli Jeddah	Sétif
20:00 UTC+2		DZfoot report Live TV: Abu Dhabi Sports	Ghareeb 56'	Stadium: Stade 8 Mai 1945; Referee: Noureddine El Jaafari (Morocco)

4 December 2018 Second leg	Al-Ahli Jeddah (Saudi Arabia)	1–1	(Algeria) ES Sétif	Jeddah
19:30 UTC+3	Al-Mowalad 49'	DZfoot report Live TV: Abu Dhabi Sports	Banouh 17'	Stadium: King Abdullah Sports City; Attendance: 6,130; Referee: Gehad Grisha (Egypt)

== Squad information ==
=== Playing statistics ===
No.	Pos	Nat	Player	Total		Ligue 1		Algerian Cup		Champions League		Club Championship	
No.	Pos	Nat	Player	Apps	Goals	Apps	Goals	Apps	Goals	Apps	Goals	Apps	Goals
Goalkeepers
1	GK	(Algeria) ALG	Moustapha Zeghba	36	0	20	0	5	0	7	0	4	0
30	GK	(Algeria) ALG	Abderrahmane Boultif	13	0	10	0	2	0	1	0	0	0
	GK	(Algeria) ALG	Salem Herrada	1	0	1	0	0	0	0	0	0	0
Defenders
4	DF	(Algeria) ALG	Anes Saâd	11	0	5	0	1	0	5	0	0	0
25	DF	(Algeria) ALG	Miloud Rebiai	42	3	23	3	7	0	8	0	4	0
8	DF	(Algeria) ALG	Houari Ferhani	44	1	26	0	6	1	8	0	4	0
13	DF	(Algeria) ALG	Abdelkrim Nemdil	28	0	22	0	5	0	0	0	1	0
15	DF	(Algeria) ALG	Abdelkader Bedrane	37	4	20	2	5	2	8	0	4	0
17	DF	(Algeria) ALG	Saâdi Radouani	41	2	24	2	5	0	8	0	4	0
	DF	(Algeria) ALG	Abbés Aïchoune	2	0	1	0	1	0	0	0	0	0
	DF	(Algeria) ALG	Abderraouf Seddik Boussoualim	1	0	1	0	0	0	0	0	0	0
Midfielders
10	MF	(Algeria) ALG	Abdelmoumene Djabou	34	7	16	4	7	1	8	0	3	2
6	MF	(Algeria) ALG	Ilyes Sidhoum	24	0	12	0	3	0	8	0	1	0
7	MF	(Algeria) ALG	Akram Djahnit	40	5	25	3	4	1	7	1	4	0
11	MF	(Algeria) ALG	Mohamed Islam Bakir	45	6	29	3	6	1	7	2	3	0
24	MF	(Algeria) ALG	Amir Karaoui	25	0	19	0	3	0	0	0	3	0
17	MF	(Algeria) ALG	Zakaria Draoui	39	1	28	1	7	0	0	0	4	0
21	MF	(Algeria) ALG	Samir Aiboud	41	3	23	2	6	1	8	0	4	0
26	MF	(Algeria) ALG	Mustapha Boussif	7	0	2	0	0	0	4	0	1	0
29	DF	(Algeria) ALG	Youcef Laouafi	21	0	18	0	2	0	0	0	1	0
	MF	(Algeria) ALG	Ahmed Kendouci	5	0	5	0	0	0	0	0	0	0
	MF	(Algeria) ALG	Ibrahim Hachoud	2	0	2	0	0	0	0	0	0	0
Forwards
9	FW	(Algeria) ALG	Habib Bouguelmouna	25	14	12	9	4	2	8	3	1	0
29	FW	(Algeria) ALG	Houssam Ghacha	40	4	26	1	7	1	6	2	1	0
18	FW	(Algeria) ALG	Hamza Banouh	32	2	17	0	6	1	6	0	3	1
20	FW	(Algeria) ALG	Chouaib Debbih	10	0	6	0	4	0	0	0	0	0
	FW	(Algeria) ALG	Khier-Anes Belaïd	1	0	1	0	0	0	0	0	0	0
	FW	(Algeria) ALG	Abderrahim Deghmoum	9	1	8	1	1	0	0	0	0	0
	FW	(Algeria) ALG	Abdallah Salaheddine Rahba	1	0	1	0	0	0	0	0	0	0
Players transferred out during the season
20	MF	(Senegal) SEN	Isla Daoudi Diomande	11	0	4	0	0	0	5	0	2	0
23	FW	(Algeria) ALG	Sid Ali Lakroum	14	3	12	3	0	0	0	0	2	0

Last updated: 11 June 2018
Source: fr.soccerway.com

== Squad list ==
As of August 11, 2018. Note: Flags indicate national team as defined under FIFA eligibility rules; some limited exceptions apply. Players may hold more than one non-FIFA nationality.

No.	Pos.	Nation	Player
1	GK	ALG	Moustapha Zeghba
5	MF	GAB	Franck Obambou
6	MF	ALG	Ilyes Sidhoum
7	MF	ALG	Akram Djahnit
8	DF	ALG	Houari Ferhani
9	FW	ALG	Habib Bouguelmouna
10	FW	ALG	Abdelmoumene Djabou
11	MF	ALG	Mohamed Islam Bakir
13	DF	ALG	Abdelkrim Nemdil
14	MF	ALG	Amir Karaoui
15	DF	ALG	Abdelkader Bedrane
16	GK	ALG	Hocine Nasri
17	MF	ALG	Zakaria Draoui

No.	Pos.	Nation	Player
18	FW	ALG	Hamza Banouh
19	DF	ALG	Saâdi Radouani
20	FW	ALG	Chouaib Debbih
21	MF	ALG	Samir Aiboud
23	FW	ALG	Ali Lakroum
24	DF	ALG	Anes Saad
25	DF	ALG	Miloud Rebiai
26	MF	ALG	Mustapha Boussif
27	FW	ALG	Houssam Ghacha
28	MF	CIV	Isla Daoudi Diomande
29	DF	ALG	Youcef Laouafi
30	GK	ALG	Abderrahmane Boultif

== Transfers ==
=== In ===
Date	Pos	Player	From club	Transfer fee	Source
27 May 2018	DF	(Algeria) Houari Ferhani	JS Kabylie	Free transfer	
27 May 2018	MF	(Algeria) Zakaria Draoui	CR Belouizdad	Free transfer	
28 May 2018	FW	(Algeria) Sid Ali Lakroum	CR Belouizdad	Free transfer	
29 May 2018	DF	(Algeria) Saâdi Radouani	JS Kabylie	Free transfer	
2 June 2018	MF	(Algeria) Chouaib Debbih	AS Ain M'lila	Free transfer	
3 June 2018	DF	(Algeria) Houssemeddine Guecha	USM Blida	Free transfer	
4 June 2018	FW	(Algeria) Habib Bouguelmouna	USM Bel Abbès	Free transfer	
4 June 2018	MF	(Algeria) Benamar Mellel	USM El Harrach	Free transfer	
4 June 2018	GK	(Algeria) Abderrahmane Boultif	JS Kabylie	Free transfer	
5 June 2018	MF	(Algeria) Sabri Boumaiza	RC Kouba	Free transfer	
5 July 2018	MF	(Algeria) Amir Karaoui	MC Alger	Free transfer	
10 July 2018	DF	(Ivory Coast) Isla Daoudi Diomandé	(France) SO Cholet	Free transfer	
7 August 2018	FW	(Algeria) Youssef Laoufi	MC El Eulma	Free transfer	
14 January 2019	FW	(Nigeria) Ifeanyi Ifeanyi	(Nigeria) Akwa United	Free transfer	

=== Out ===
Date	Pos	Player	To club	Transfer fee	Source
25 May 2018	MF	(Algeria) Zakaria Haddouche	MC Alger	Free transfer	
6 June 2018	MF	(Algeria) Hamza Aït Ouamar	MC Oran	Free transfer	
8 June 2018	FW	(Algeria) Abdelhakim Amokrane	MO Béjaïa	Free transfer (Released)	
9 June 2018	MF	(Algeria) Sid Ahmed Aouedj	JS Saoura	Free transfer (Released)	
19 June 2018	FW	(Algeria) Mourad Benayad	USM Bel Abbès	Free transfer (Released)	
19 June 2018	FW	(Algeria) Rachid Nadji	MC Oran	Free transfer	
2 July 2018	DF	(Algeria) Mohamed Khoutir Ziti	CA Bordj Bou Arreridj	Free transfer	
9 July 2018	DF	(Algeria) Djamel Ibouzidène	AS Ain M'lila	Free transfer	
18 December 2018	MF	(Ivory Coast) Isla Daoudi Diomandé	CA Bordj Bou Arreridj	Free transfer	
15 January 2019	FW	(Algeria) Ali Lakroum	(Saudi Arabia) Al-Qaisumah	Free transfer	
