= Nadir Benoufella =

Algerian footballer (born 1987)

Nadir Benoufella (in kabyle: Nadir Bennufella), born on April 3, 1987, in Algeria. He is a football player currently playing as a goalkeeper for JS Kabylie in the Algerian league.

In October 2007, he was called up to the Algerian national military team.

== Club career ==
- 2007-pres. JS Kabylie

== Honours ==
- Won the Algerian League once with JS Kabylie in 2008
