= Saâdi Radouani =

Algerian footballer (born 1995)

Personal information
- Full name: Saâdi Radouani
- Date of birth: 18 March 1995 (age 31)
- Place of birth: Sétif, Algeria
- Height: 1.82 m (6 ft 0 in)
- Position: Right-back

Team information
- Current team: USM Alger
- Number: 19

Youth career
- USM Sétif
- ES Sétif
- 2010–2015: USM Alger

Senior career*
Years	Team	Apps	(Gls)
2015–2016	USM Alger	3	(0)
2016–2018	JS Kabylie	54	(1)
2018–2020	ES Sétif	40	(4)
2020–	USM Alger	135	(4)

International career^{‡}
2016–2017	Algeria U23	8	(0)
2022–	Algeria A'	7	(0)
2024–	Algeria	3	(0)
- * Club domestic league appearances and goals as of 6 June 2026 ‡ National team caps and goals as of 29 September 2026

Saâdi Radouani (Arabic: سَعْدِيّ رِضْوَانِيّ; born 18 March 1995) is an Algerian footballer who plays for USM Alger in the Algerian Ligue Professionnelle 1 and the Algeria national team. He plays primarily as a right-back.

== Career ==
Saâdi Radouani started his career with the youth of Stade africain sétifien then moved to USM Sétif where did he play as a striker, after which he moved to the neighbor ES Sétif. In 2010, Radouani joined the youth of USM Alger where did he win four consecutive championships with them. In the 2015–16 season, Radouani signed his first professional contract and his first match was against USM Blida. At the end of the season, Radouani won the first title in his football career by winning the Ligue 1 title.

=== JS Kabylie ===
Saâdi Radouani started the search phase for a club that would give him the chance to play more especially since he was at the end of his contract, where he receive several offers including a call from the President of CA Batna, The manager of ES Setif and CR Belouizdad also contacted him, and with the departure of Mohamed Khoutir Ziti from JS Kabylie, Radouani was presented to Mohand Chérif Hannachi by someone who gave him guarantees, to decide to sign with him for two seasons.

In the first match of the season against JS Saoura there was talk of the disappearance of Radouani's license, He said that the matter does not concern him as he is just a player and he said that the administration is responsible for that if there is a problem. Despite the departure of Hannachi, Radouani continued to shine where Azzedine Aït Djoudi put confidence in him and reached the Algerian Cup final with his team where they were defeated.

At the end of his contract, Radouani was expected to renew his contract and with the arrival of a new president Chérif Mellal, he asked Radouani to wait for his return, but after learned that he had negotiated with a player in the same position, Radouani decided not to renew his contract.

=== ES Sétif ===
Saâdi Radouani started negotiations to join MC Alger especially since Bernard Casoni requested him to agree on everything with Kamel Kaci-Saïd. However, Hassan Hammar president of ES Sétif went to his family home where he met his father and in order to be close to his family and fulfill his dream of playing in the heart team Radouani signed a contract for two seasons, then he called Kaci-Saïd to apologize.

In the first season Radouani was a key player in the team, despite not winning any title and ES Sétif settled for the semi-finals in the Algerian Cup and the Champions League. In the second season his problems began with injury and stated that he was playing with injections, although he did not receive eleven months’ salaries, and after the Ligue 1 stopped due to the COVID-19 pandemic in Algeria, Radouani received a call from the administration who asked him to give up six months of his salary before talking about renewing the contract, then decides to search for a new club.

=== USM Alger ===
==== Return to USM Alger, continental success and domestic cup triumphs ====
On August 17, 2020, Saâdi Radouani signed a two-year contract with USM Alger, returning to his former club after five years. In the second league match against JS Saoura away from home Radouani scored his first goal with USMA in a match that ended in a 2–2 draw. On June 30, 2022, Radouani were invited to negotiate a new contract, officials quickly reached an agreement with him in question to extend their contract for another two seasons. On June 3, 2023, Radouani won the first international title in his football career by winning the 2022–23 CAF Confederation Cup after defeating Young Africans of Tanzania. On August 16, 2023, Radouani renewed his contract for two seasons until 2026 along with nine other players. On 15 September 2023, Radouani won the CAF Super Cup title after winning against Al Ahly, it is the second African title with USM Alger in three months. After winning the CAF Confederation Cup, Radouani renewed his contract on 16 August 2023 for two additional seasons, keeping him at the club until 2026.

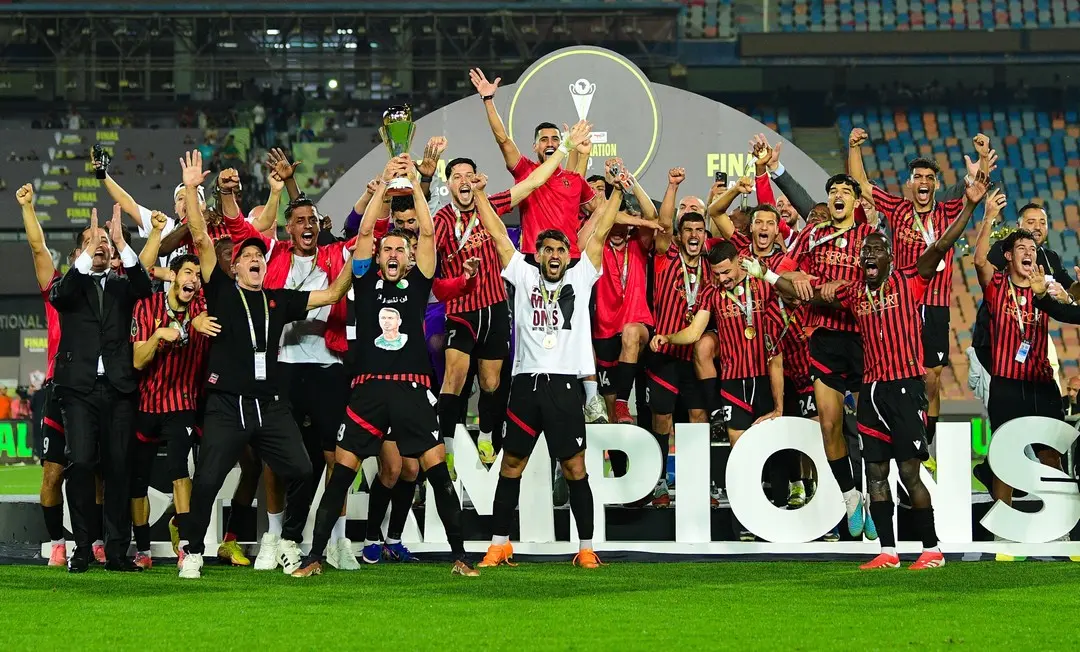
Saâdi Radouani, the captain, holding the 2025–26 CAF Confederation Cup for the second time.

Saâdi Radouani was part of USM Alger's squad during their successful 2024–25 Algerian Cup campaign, where the team won the title after defeating CR Belouizdad 2–0 in the final. However, his involvement during this first cup triumph was limited, as he was not a regular starter throughout the competition. In the following season, Radouani played a much more significant role in the team's journey, contributing more consistently across competitions, including the 2025–26 CAF Confederation Cup run where USM Alger reached the final. Domestically, he featured prominently in the 2025–26 Algerian Cup campaign and captained the team in the final against the same opponent, leading USM Alger to a 2–1 victory and their tenth title in the competition.

==== Contract extension and 2026 CAF Super Cup triumph ====
On 23 August 2026, USM Alger extended Saâdi Radouani's contract for three additional seasons as part of the club's efforts to retain key players and maintain squad stability, keeping him at the club until 2030. On 8 November 2026, during the 2026 CAF Super Cup against Mamelodi Sundowns, Radouani scored USM Alger's second goal, putting his team back in the lead before half-time. Following a corner delivered by Boulaya and a header by Azzi that struck the crossbar, Radouani headed the rebound into the net. USM Alger eventually won the match 3–1 to claim the continental title. Following the victory, Radouani expressed his satisfaction with the result and highlighted the squad's pride in representing both the club and Algeria. He stated: "We are all proud to have represented our colours and our country, Algeria, in the best possible way. This victory is for everyone who supported us, those who travelled all the way to Pretoria, as well as those who stayed at home and supported us in their own way." He also addressed USM Alger's rivals, saying: "We have proved that when we are in good form, it is difficult to stop us."

== International career ==
On January 2, 2023, Radouani was selected for the 28-man squad to participate in the 2022 African Nations Championship.

== Career statistics ==
=== Club ===
As of 18 September 2026

Club	Season	League			Cup		Continental		Other		Total	
Club	Season	Division	Apps	Goals	Apps	Goals	Apps	Goals	Apps	Goals	Apps	Goals
USM Alger	2015–16	Ligue 1	3	0	—		—		—		3	0
JS Kabylie	2016–17	Ligue 1	29	0	4	2	6 (Note: All appearance(s) in CAF Confederation Cup)	0	—		39	2
JS Kabylie	2017–18	Ligue 1	25	1	5	1	—		—		30	2
JS Kabylie	Total		54	1	9	3	6	0	—		69	4
ES Sétif	2018–19	Ligue 1	24	2	5	0	8 (Note: All appearance(s) in Champions League)	0	4 (Note: All appearance(s) in Arab Club Champions Cup)	0	41	2
ES Sétif	2019–20	Ligue 1	16	2	3	0	—		—		19	2
ES Sétif	Total		40	4	8	0	8	0	4	0	60	4
USM Alger	2020–21	Ligue 1	17	1	—		—		2 (Note: All appearance(s) in Algerian League Cup)	0	19	1
USM Alger	2021–22	Ligue 1	25	0	—		—		—		25	0
USM Alger	2022–23	Ligue 1	24	2	—		12	2	—		36	4
USM Alger	2023–24	Ligue 1	28	1	4	0	11 (Note: 1 appearance in CAF Super Cup, 10 appearances and 1 goal in CAF Confederation Cup)	1	—		43	2
USM Alger	2024–25	Ligue 1	21	0	3	0	8	2	—		32	2
USM Alger	2025–26	Ligue 1	20	0	6	1	11	1	1 (Note: All appearances in Algerian Super Cup)	0	38	2
USM Alger	2026–27	Ligue 1	3	0	0	0	0	0	0	0	3	0
USM Alger	Total		138	4	13	1	42	6	3	0	196	11
Career total			235	9	30	4	56	6	7	0	328	19

== Honours ==
USM Alger

- Algerian Ligue Professionnelle 1: 2015-16
- Algerian Cup: 2024–25, 2025–26
- CAF Confederation Cup: 2022–23,2025–26
- CAF Super Cup: 2023,2026
