= Steve Ekedi =

Cameroonian footballer (born 1991)

Personal information
- Full name: Steve Thibaut Ekedi Soppo
- Date of birth: 24 May 1991 (age 35)
- Place of birth: Douala, Cameroon
- Height: 1.88 m (6 ft 2 in)
- Position: Forward

Senior career*
Years	Team	Apps	(Gls)
2009–2011	Elche Ilicitano		
2011–2012	Racing Ferrol		
2012	Somozas	14	(4)
2013	Bergantiños	15	(1)
2013–2014	Barco	21	(18)
2014	Torrevieja	14	(3)
2015	Bergantiños	15	(10)
2015–2017	Desportivo das Aves	3	(1)
2015–2016	→ Académico de Viseu (loan)	10	(2)
2016	→ 1º Dezembro (loan)	9	(1)
2017	→ Freamunde (loan)	11	(2)
2017–2018	JS Kabylie	8	(1)
2018–2019	Bergantiños	34	(0)
2019–2020	Lealtad	25	(13)
2020–2021	Olímpic de Xàtiva	21	(12)
2021–2022	Torrent	33	(9)
2022–2023	Atzeneta	9	(0)
2023–2024	Jove Español	34	(8)
- * Club domestic league appearances and goals as of 22 June 2024

Steve Thibaut Ekedi Soppo (born 24 May 1991), known as Steve Ekedi, is a Cameroonian footballer who plays as a forward.

== Career ==
Ekedi made his professional debut in the Segunda Liga for Desportivo das Aves on 8 November 2015 in a game against Famalicão and scored on his debut.
