= Saïd Ferguène =

Algerian football player (born 1992)

Personal information
- Full name: Saïd Ferguène
- Date of birth: June 16, 1992 (age 34)
- Place of birth: Tizi Ouzou, Algeria
- Height: 1.83 m (6 ft 0 in)
- Position: Forward

Youth career
- –2011: JS Kabylie

Senior career*
Years	Team	Apps	(Gls)
2011–2016	JS Kabylie	34	(1)

International career^{‡}
2009	Algeria U17	25	(2)
- * Club domestic league appearances and goals as of 00:00, 30 October 2011 (UTC) ‡ National team caps and goals as of 00:00, 30 October 2011 (UTC)

Saïd Ferguène (born June 16, 1992) is an Algerian football player.

== Club career ==
Ferguène began his career in the youth ranks of his hometown club of JS Kabylie. On June 8, 2011, Ferguène made his professional debut for JS Kabylie as a starter in a league match against MC Alger.

== International career ==
Ferguène was a member of the Algerian Under-17 National Team at the 2009 FIFA U-17 World Cup in Nigeria. An unused substitute in the opener against Italy, he sprained his ankle prior to the second game against Uruguay and was forced to miss the rest of the competition.
