= Ziri Hammar =

Algerian footballer (born 1992)

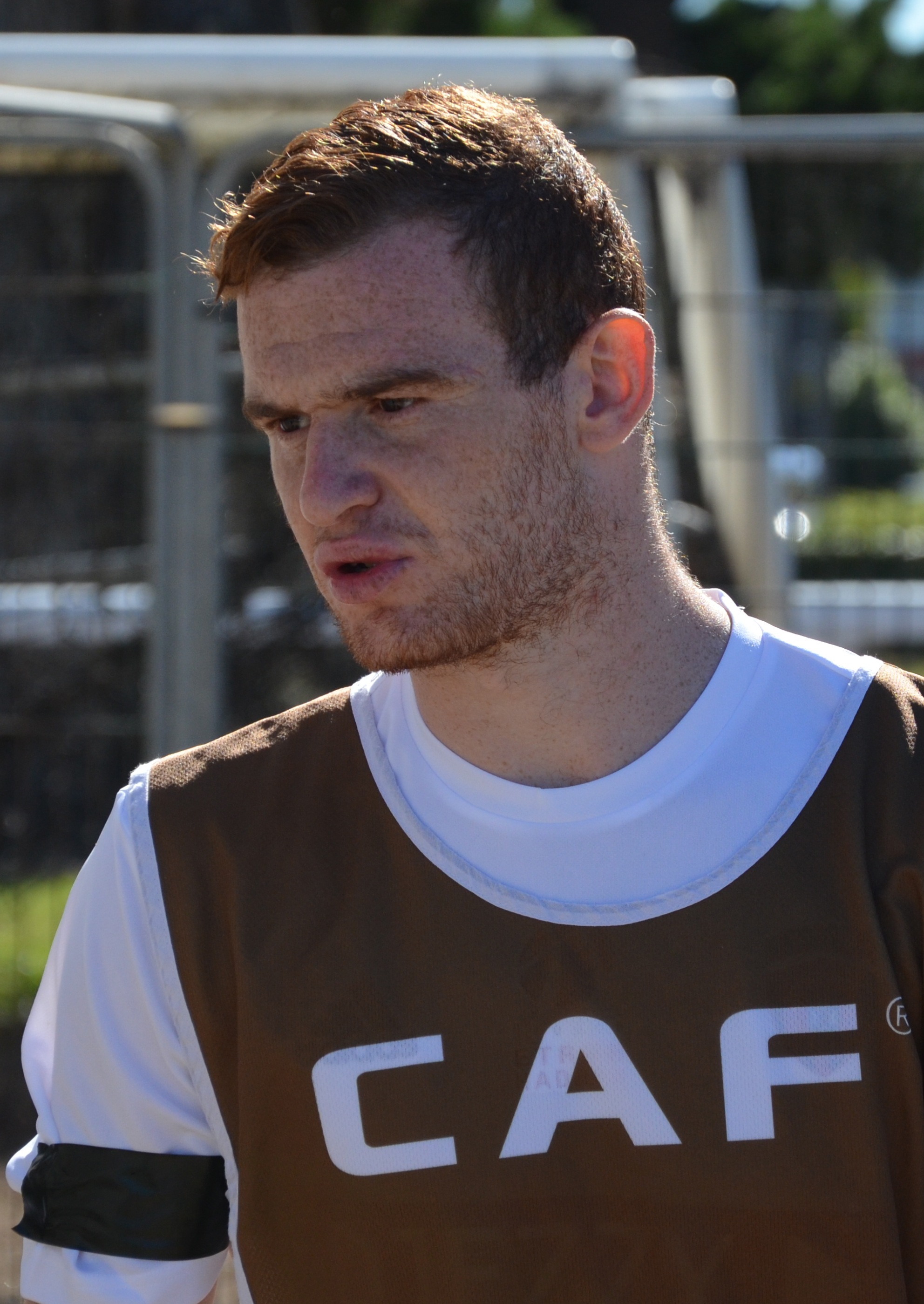

Personal information
- Full name: Ziri Hammar
- Date of birth: July 25, 1992 (age 34)
- Place of birth: Akbou, Algeria
- Height: 1.82 m (6 ft 0 in)
- Position: Attacking midfielder

Team information
- Current team: Al-Salt
- Number: 8

Youth career
- JSM Béjaïa
- 2008–2011: Nancy

Senior career*
Years	Team	Apps	(Gls)
2011–2013	Nancy	10	(0)
2013–2014	Kayseri Erciyesspor	1	(0)
2014–2015	Arles-Avignon	9	(1)
2015–2016	JS Saoura	16	(3)
2016–2018	USM Alger	16	(2)
2017–2018	→ JS Kabylie (loan)	13	(2)
2018	→ MC Oran (loan)	7	(2)
2019–2020	JS Saoura	0	(0)
2020–2021	US Biskra	0	(0)
2021–2022	Olympique Akbou	0	(0)
2022–2023	Al-Nasr Zliten	0	(0)
2024–	Al-Salt	0	(0)

International career
2009	Algeria U17		
- * Club domestic league appearances and goals as of 24 December 2018

Ziri Hammar (Arabic: زيري حمّار; born July 25, 1992) is an Algerian football player. He currently players for Al-Salt in the Jordanian Pro League. He plays as an attacking midfielder and can play on both sides of the field.

== Club career ==
On February 12, 2011, Hammar made his professional debut for AS Nancy in a Ligue 1 game against AJ Auxerre. Hammar started the game on the bench and came on as a substitute in the 89th minute in place of Alexandre Cuvillier, as Nancy went on to win 3–1.

Before the 2013-2014 Süper Lig season, Hammar moved to Kayseri Erciyesspor. He played his first match for his new team in a Turkish Cup meeting against Edirnespor.

On 30 July 2024, Al-Salt announced the signing of both Hammar and Algerian compatriot Mounir Ait L'Hadi to the club.

== International career ==
Hammar was a member of the Algerian Under-17 National Team at the 2009 FIFA U-17 World Cup in Nigeria. He played in all three of Algeria's group stage games at the World Cup, coming on as a substitute in the first two and starting the final one against South Korea. However, Algeria lost all three games and failed to progress to the second round.

On March 24, 2010, Hammar was called up to the Algerian Under-20 National Team for the 2010 UNAF U-20 Tournament in Algeria.

== Honours ==
=== Club ===
USM Alger

- Algerian Super Cup (1): 2016
