= Nassim Yattou =

Algerian footballer (born 1992)

Personal information
- Full name: Mohamed Nassim Yattou
- Date of birth: 27 March 1992 (age 34)
- Place of birth: El Biar, Algeria
- Position: Midfielder

Team information
- Current team: USM El Harrach
- Number: 23

Youth career
- MC Alger
- USM Alger

Senior career*
Years	Team	Apps	(Gls)
2011–2013	USM Alger	6	(0)
2013–2014	→ MO Béjaïa (loan)	28	(7)
2014–2016	RC Arbaâ	51	(7)
2016–2018	JS Kabylie	56	(6)
2018	MC Oran	14	(0)
2019–2021	CS Constantine	60	(7)
2022–2023	ES Sétif	32	(1)
2024–2025	Paradou AC	25	(2)
2025–2026	ES Ben Aknoun	21	(0)
2026–	USM El Harrach	0	(0)
- * Club domestic league appearances and goals as of 3 August 2026

Mohamed Nassim Yattou (Arabic: محمد نسيم يطو; born 27 March 1992) is an Algerian footballer who plays as a midfielder for USM El Harrach.

== Career ==
On 2 August 2026, he joined USM El Harrach.
