= Mohamed Boulaouidet =

Algerian footballer (born 1990)

Personal information
- Full name: Mohamed El Hadi Boulaouidet
- Date of birth: May 2, 1990 (age 36)
- Place of birth: Constantine, Algeria
- Height: 1.89 m (6 ft 2 1/2 in)
- Position: Striker

Youth career
- –2009: CS Constantine

Senior career*
Years	Team	Apps	(Gls)
2009–2011	CS Constantine		
2011	→ AB Mérouana (loan)		
2011–2013	AB Mérouana		
2013–2014	US Chaouia	27	(1)
2014–2015	Olympique de Médéa	24	(8)
2015–2017	JS Kabylie	55	(16)
2017	NA Hussein Dey	6	(2)
2018	Ohod	6	(0)
2018–2019	JS Saoura	12	(3)
2019	Al-Hilal Club		
2020–2021	ASO Chlef	22	(4)
2021–2022	AS Aïn M'lila		
2022–2023	CA Batna		
2023–2024	Olympique Akbou	12	(7)
2024	Olympique Akbou	0	(0)

International career^{‡}
2017	Algeria A'	1	(0)
- * Club domestic league appearances and goals as of 1 February 2024 ‡ National team caps and goals as of 12 August 2017

Mohamed El Hadi Boulaouidet (Arabic: محمد الهادي بولعويدات; born May 2, 1990) is an Algerian professional footballer. He plays as a striker.

== Club career ==
In June 2015, Boulaouidet joined JS Kabylie, signing a two-year contract with the club. On 1 February 2024, he joined RC Kouba.
