= Abderrahmane Boultif =

Algerian footballer (born 1987)

Personal information
- Date of birth: 28 February 1987 (age 39)
- Place of birth: Batna, Algeria
- Position: Goalkeeper

Team information
- Current team: AS Khroub
- Number: 1

Senior career*
Years	Team	Apps	(Gls)
2009–2010	CA Bordj Bou Arréridj	3	(0)
2011–2012	CA Batna	13	(0)
2013–2014	CRB Aïn Fakroun	7	(0)
2015–2018	JS Kabylie	21	(0)
2018–2019	ES Setif	10	(0)
2019–2021	AS Aïn M'lila	42	(0)
2021–2023	CA Batna		
2023–	AS Khroub	0	(0)
- * Club domestic league appearances and goals as of 27 October 2023

Abderrahmane Boultif (Arabic: عبد الرحمان بولطيف; born 28 February 1987) is an Algerian footballer who plays as a goalkeeper for AS Khroub in the Algerian Ligue 2.
