= Houari Ferhani =

Algerian footballer (born 1993)

Personal information
- Full name: Houari Ferhani
- Date of birth: February 11, 1993 (age 33)
- Place of birth: Koléa, Algeria
- Height: 1.68 m (5 ft 6 in)
- Position: Left-back

Team information
- Current team: Olympic Safi

Youth career
- 2006–2013: USM Blida
- 2013–2014: USM Alger

Senior career*
Years	Team	Apps	(Gls)
2014–2016	RC Arbaâ	36	(1)
2016–2018	JS Kabylie	61	(2)
2018–2022	ES Sétif	60	(1)
2022–2023	MC Alger	17	(0)
2023–2024	Olympic Safi	21	(1)
2024–2025	ES Sétif	36	(0)
2026–	Olympic Safi	14	(0)

International career^{‡}
2014–2016	Algeria U23	19	(0)
2017	Algeria	2	(0)
- * Club domestic league appearances and goals as of 14 August 2026 ‡ National team caps and goals as of 14 November 2017

Houari Ferhani (Arabic: هواري فرحاني; born February 11, 1993) is an Algerian footballer who plays as Left-back for Olympic Safi.

== Career ==
In October 2015, Ferhani was selected as part of the Algeria's under-23 national team for the 2015 U-23 Africa Cup of Nations in Senegal.

Ferhani got his first call up to the senior Algeria side for a 2018 FIFA World Cup qualifier against Cameroon in October 2016.

On 20 June 2022, he joined MC Alger. On 21 August 2023, he joined Olympic Safi.

On 12 September 2024, he returned to ES Setif.

On 16 January 2026, he returned to Olympic Safi.
