= 2017–18 ES Sétif season =

ES Sétif
2017–18 season
- Chairman: Hassan Hammar
- Head coach: Kheïreddine Madoui (until 17 December 2017); Malik Zorgane (interim) (from 17 December 2017) (until 29 December 2017); Abdelhak Benchikha (from 30 December 2017) (until 25 April 2018); Malik Zorgane (interim) (from 25 April 2018)
- Stadium: Stade 8 Mai 1945
- Ligue 1: 8th
- Algerian Cup: Round of 32
- Super Cup: Winners
- Champions League: Group stage
- Top goalscorer: League: Mourad Benayad (7); All: Zakaria Haddouche (9)
Home colours	Away colours

In the 2017–18 season, ES Sétif competed in Ligue 1 for the 48th season, as well as the Algerian Cup.

== Squad list ==
Players and squad numbers last updated on 18 November 2010.
Note: Flags indicate national team as has been defined under FIFA eligibility rules. Players may hold more than one non-FIFA nationality.

No.	Nat.	Position	Name	Date of birth (age)	Signed from
Goalkeepers
Defenders
Midfielders
Forwards

== Competitions ==
=== Overview ===
Competition	Record								Started round	Final position / round	First match	Last match
Competition	G	W	D	L	GF	GA	GD	Win %	Started round	Final position / round	First match	Last match
Ligue 1	30	10	10	10	35	30	+5	33.33	—N/a	8th	26 August 2017	19 May 2018
Algerian Cup	2	1	0	1	2	1	+1	50.00	Round of 64	Round of 32	29 December 2017	15 January 2018
Super Cup	1	0	1	0	0	0	+0	0.00	Final	Winners	1 November 2017	
Champions League	6	2	1	3	11	6	+5	33.33	First round	Group stage	11 February 2018	15 May 2018
Total	0	0	0	0	0	0	+0	—				

Updated to match played 9 May 2017
Source: Competitions

== League table ==
Pos	Team	Pld	W	D	L	GF	GA	GD	Pts	Qualification or relegation
6	USM Alger	30	11	9	10	43	35	+8	42 (Note: Ranked on head-to-head results.)	Qualification for 2018–19 Arab Club Champions Cup
7	Paradou AC	30	12	6	12	35	30	+5	42	
8	ES Sétif	30	10	10	10	35	30	+5	40	Qualification for 2018–19 Arab Club Champions Cup
9	DRB Tadjenanet	30	10	7	13	33	41	−8	37 (Note: Ranked on head-to-head results.)	
10	USM Bel Abbès (Note: USM Bel Abbès were deducted 6 points. FIFA's decision was taken at its meeting on 9 June 2017, ordering the club to pay the amount due to the player Jessy Mayele as well as a fine of CHF 15,000 (15,000 Swiss francs).)	30	12	7	11	32	31	+1	37	Qualification for the 2018–19 Confederation Cup

Updated to match(es) played on 19 May 2018. Source: DZFoot
Rules for classification: 1) points; 2) head-to-head points; 3) head-to-head goal difference; 4) goal difference; 5) total goals; 6) fairplay ranking; 7) playoff.

=== Results summary ===
Overall								Home						Away					
Pld	W	D	L	GF	GA	GD	Pts	W	D	L	GF	GA	GD	W	D	L	GF	GA	GD
30	10	10	10	35	30	+5	40	9	3	3	24	12	+12	1	7	7	11	18	−7

Last updated: 30 January 2016.
Source: Competitive matches

=== Results by round ===
Round	1	2	3	4	5	6	7	8	9	10	11	12	13	14	15	16	17	18	19	20	21	22	23	24	25	26	27	28	29	30
Ground	H	A	H	H	A	H	A	H	A	H	A	H	A	H	A	A	H	A	A	H	A	H	A	H	A	H	A	H	A	H
Result	W	D	W	W	D	D	L	L	W	D	D	W	D	W	L	D	L	L	D	W	D	W	L	W	L	W	L	L	L	D
Position	4	4	3	2	2	3	6	7	4	4	5	4	4	3	4	6	7	7	8	8	8	6	8	6	7	7	7	7	8	8

Updated to match(es) played on 11 June 2018. Source: Competitive matches
A = Away; H = Home; W = Win; D = Draw; L = Loss

=== Matches ===
Win Draw Loss

26 August 2017 Round 1	ES Sétif	2–1	USM El Harrach	Sétif
19:00	Nessakh 32'; Mazari 66' (o.g.)	report Live TV: None	8' Kherbache	Stadium: Stade 8 Mai 1945; Attendance: 0 (close doors); Referee: Mohamed Boukhalfa

9 September 2017 Round 2	MC Alger	1–1	ES Sétif	Bologhine
17:45	Azzi 25'	Soccerway report Live TV: None	65' Bedrane	Stadium: Omar Hamadi Stadium; Attendance: 0 (close doors); Referee: Mustapha Bessiri

16 September 2017 Round 3	ES Sétif	1–0	US Biskra	Sétif
17:45	Djabou 23' (pen.)	Soccerway report Live TV: Algérie 3		Stadium: Stade 8 Mai 1945; Referee: Abderrezzak Arab; Man of the Match: Saad

23 September 2017 Round 4	ES Sétif	2–0	JS Saoura	Sétif
17:00	Djabou 28'; Amokrane 44'	Soccerway report Live TV: Algérie 3 / Canal Algérie		Stadium: Stade 8 Mai 1945; Referee: Mohamed Saïdi

30 September 2017 Round 5	CR Belouizdad	0–0	ES Sétif	Belouizdad
17:00		report Live TV: Algérie 3		Stadium: Stade 20 Août 1955; Referee: Mohamed Boukhalfa

13 October 2017 Round 6	ES Sétif	0–0	Olympique de Médéa	Sétif
17:00		Soccerway report Live TV: TV Tamazight 4		Stadium: Stade 8 Mai 1945; Referee: Lyés Bekouassa

17 October 2017 Round 7	CS Constantine	2–1	ES Sétif	Constantine
17:45	Abid 88'; Arroussi 90'	Soccerway report Live TV: Algérie 3	52' (o.g.) Benayada	Stadium: Stade Mohamed Hamlaoui; Referee: Merzak Halalchi

27 October 2017 Round 9	MC Oran	1–2	ES Sétif	Oran
16:00	Toumi 62'	Soccerway report Live TV: Canal Algérie / Algérie 3	1', 84' Haddouche	Stadium: Ahmed Zabana Stadium; Referee: Merzoug Brahimi

7 November 2017 Round 10	ES Sétif	0–0	JS Kabylie	Sétif
17:00		Soccerway report Live TV: EPTV Terrestre		Stadium: Stade 8 Mai 1945; Referee: Said Aouina

11 November 2017 Round 11	USM Blida	0–0	ES Sétif	Blida
15:00		Soccerway report Live TV: None		Stadium: Brakni Brothers Stadium; Referee: Farouk Mial

18 November 2017 Round 12	ES Sétif	2–1	Paradou AC	Sétif
17:00	Amokrane 45+3'; Benayad 75'	Soccerway report Live TV: Algérie 3	64' Benayad	Stadium: Stade 8 Mai 1945; Referee: Abderrezzak Arab

2 December 2017 Round 13	NA Hussein Dey	0–0	ES Sétif	Belouizdad
16:00		Soccerway report Live TV: Canal Algérie		Stadium: Stade 20 Août 1955; Referee: Mustapha Bessiri

8 December 2017 Round 14	ES Sétif	2–0	DRB Tadjenanet	Sétif
17:00	Benayad 5'; Rebiai 37'	Soccerway report Live TV: None		Stadium: Stade 8 Mai 1945; Referee: Merzak Halalchi

12 December 2017 Round 8	ES Sétif	1–2	USM Alger	Sétif
17:00	Benayad 54'	Soccerway report Live TV: Canal Algérie / TV Tamazight 4	5' Darfalou; 75' Chafaï	Stadium: Stade 8 Mai 1945; Referee: Mehdi Abid Charef

16 December 2017 Round 15	USM Bel-Abbès	2–1	ES Sétif	Sidi Bel Abbès
16:00	Belhocini 44'; Bouguelmouna 47'	Soccerway report Live TV: Algérie 3	17' Nadji	Stadium: Stade 24 Fevrier 1956; Referee: Lyés Bekouassa

5 January 2018 Round 16	USM El Harrach	0–0	ES Sétif	El Harrach
16:00		Soccerway report Live TV: None		Stadium: November 1, 1954 Stadium; Attendance: 0 (close doors); Referee: Ahmed Bouzrar

20 January 2018 Round 17	ES Sétif	1–2	MC Alger	Sétif
19:00	Nadji 1'	Soccerway report Live TV: TV Tamazight 4	12' Souibaâh; 80' Nekkache	Stadium: Stade 8 Mai 1945; Referee: Mohamed Saïdi

25 January 2018 Round 18	US Biskra	1–0	ES Sétif	Biskra
16:00	El Okbi 57' (pen.)	Soccerway report Live TV: Canal Algérie		Stadium: El Alia Sports Complex; Referee: Merzak Halalchi

6 February 2018 Round 19	JS Saoura	0–0	ES Sétif	Béchar
17:00		Soccerway report Live TV: None		Stadium: Stade 20 Août 1955; Referee: Mustapha Bessiri

15 February 2018 Round 20	ES Sétif	2–1	CR Belouizdad	Sétif
17:00	Benayad 59'; Haddouche 87'	Soccerway report Live TV: None	7' Namani	Stadium: Stade 8 Mai 1945; Referee: Mehdi Abid Charef

24 February 2018 Round 21	Olympique de Médéa	0–0	ES Sétif	Médéa
15:00		Soccerway report Live TV: None		Stadium: Stade Imam Lyes de Médéa; Referee: Missoum Benabdellah

2 March 2018 Round 22	ES Sétif	1–0	CS Constantine	Sétif
18:00	Haddouche 33'	Soccerway report Live TV: Algérie 3		Stadium: Stade 8 Mai 1945; Referee: Ahmed Bouzrar

13 March 2018 Round 23	USM Alger	3–2	ES Sétif	Bologhine
17:00	Darfalou 8' (pen.); Koudri 50'; Chafaï 82'	Soccerway report Live TV: EPTV Terrestre / Canal Algérie	83', 90+2' Banouh	Stadium: Omar Hamadi Stadium; Referee: Mehdi Abid Charef

31 March 2018 Round 24	ES Sétif	4–1	MC Oran	Sétif
17:00	Rebiai 5'; Haddouche 24' (pen.); Aït Ouamar 35'; Banouh 84'	Soccerway report Live TV: Algérie 3 / Canal Algérie	40' Tiaïba	Stadium: Stade 8 Mai 1945; Referee: Lotfi Bekouassa

7 April 2018 Round 25	JS Kabylie	1–0	ES Sétif	Tizi Ouzou
16:00	Benyoucef 77'	Soccerway report Live TV: Al-Kass Sports / Algérie 3		Stadium: November 1, 1954 Stadium; Referee: Missoum Benabdellah

20 April 2018 Round 26	ES Sétif	5–2	USM Blida	Sétif
16:00	Benayad 3', 37', 73'; Haddouche 9'; Aït Ouamar 82'	Soccerway report Live TV: None	19' Frioui; 87' Aliouat	Stadium: Stade 8 Mai 1945; Referee: Ramdane Oukil

24 April 2018 Round 27	Paradou AC	4–2	ES Sétif	Bologhine
16:00	Bouzok 25', 62'; Benayad 64'; Loucif 65'	Soccerway report Live TV: None	11' Aiboud; 76' Obambou	Stadium: Omar Hamadi Stadium; Referee: Mustapha Bessiri

27 April 2018 Round 28	ES Sétif	1–2	NA Hussein Dey	Sétif
16:00	Banouh 88'	Soccerway report Live TV: Algérie 3	35' Gasmi; 55' Chouiter	Stadium: Stade 8 Mai 1945; Referee: Mohamed Saïdi

12 May 2018 Round 29	DRB Tadjenanet	3–2	ES Sétif	Tadjenanet
16:00	Dousse 37' (pen.), 45'; Daouadji 61'	Soccerway report Live TV: Algérie 3	59' (pen.) Aouedj; 74' (pen.) Bakir	Stadium: Lahoua Smaïl Stadium; Referee: Hamza Bouslimani

19 May 2018 Round 30	ES Sétif	0–0	USM Bel-Abbès	Sétif
16:00		Soccerway report Live TV: None		Stadium: Stade 8 Mai 1945; Referee: Hamza Boucetta

== Algerian Cup ==
29 December 2017 Round of 64	ES Sétif	2–0	MB Hassi Messaoud	Sétif
15:00	Nessakh 33'; Chibane 81'	Report; Live TV: None		Stadium: Stade 8 Mai 1945; Referee: Bouteraa, Hallal, Halam

15 January 2018 Round of 32	JS Saoura	1–0	ES Sétif	Béchar
17:00	Bourdim 90+1' (pen.)	Report; Live TV: None		Stadium: Stade 20 Août 1955; Referee: Lahlou Benbraham

== Algerian Super Cup ==
1 November 2017	ES Sétif	0–0 (4–2 p)	CR Belouizdad	Constantine
17:00		Report; Live TV: Algérie 3 / Canal Algérie / Al-Kass Sports		Stadium: Stade Mohamed Hamlaoui; Attendance: 25,000; Referee: Abderrezzak Arab
	Penalties
	Nadji (penalty scored); Djabou (penalty missed); Djahnit (penalty scored); Haddouche (penalty scored); Aït Ouamar (penalty scored)		(penalty missed) Namani; (penalty scored) Aichi; (penalty scored) Bellaili; (penalty missed) Hamia

== Champions League ==
=== Preliminary round ===
11 February 2018 first leg	ES Sétif (Algeria)	6–0	(Central African Republic) Olympic Real de Bangui	Sétif
18:00 UTC+1	Haddouche 13' (pen.), 58', 76'; Djahnit 60', 89'; Rebiai 79'	CAF report		Stadium: Stade 8 Mai 1945; Attendance: 0 (close doors); Referee: Daouda Guèye (Senegal)

20 February 2018 Second leg	Olympic Real de Bangui (Central African Republic)	0–0	(Algeria) ES Sétif	Bangui
15:00 UTC+1		CAF Report		Stadium: Barthélemy Boganda Stadium; Referee: David Ndong Esono Mokuy (Equatorial Guinea)

=== First round ===
7 March 2018 first leg	Aduana Stars (Ghana)	1–0	(Algeria) ES Sétif	Dormaa Ahenkro
15:00 UTC+0	Adams 73' (pen.)	Report		Stadium: Agyeman Badu Stadium; Referee: Denis Dembélé (Ivory Coast)

18 March 2018 Second leg	ES Sétif (Algeria)	4–0	(Ghana) Aduana Stars	Sétif
19:00 UTC+1	Benayad 27'; Ziti 43'; Bedrane 61'; Amokrane 89'	Report		Stadium: Stade 8 Mai 1945; Referee: Juste Ephrem Zio (Burkina Faso)

=== Group stage ===
==== Group B ====
Pos	Team	Pld	W	D	L	GF	GA	GD	Pts	Qualification	TPM	ESS	DHJ	MCA
1	(Democratic Republic of the Congo) TP Mazembe	6	3	3	0	10	4	+6	12	Quarter-finals	—	4–1	1–1	1–0
2	(Algeria) ES Sétif	6	2	2	2	7	9	−2	8	Quarter-finals	1–1	—	2–1	0–1
3	(Morocco) Difaâ El Jadidi	6	1	3	2	6	7	−1	6		0–2	1–1	—	2–0
4	(Algeria) MC Alger	6	1	2	3	4	7	−3	5		1–1	1–2	1–1	—

Source: CAF

5 May 2018 1	TP Mazembe (Democratic Republic of the Congo)	4–1	(Algeria) ES Sétif	Lubumbashi
15:00 UTC+2	Malango 10', 23' (pen.); Meschak 63'; Sinkala 82' (pen.)	Report	Nessakh 12'	Stadium: Stade TP Mazembe; Attendance: 17,000; Referee: Hamada Nampiandraza (Madagascar)

15 May 2018 2	ES Sétif (Algeria)	0–1	(Algeria) MC Alger	Sétif
20:00 UTC+1		Report	Karaoui 89'	Stadium: Stade du 8-Mai-1945; Attendance: 20,000; Referee: Gehad Grisha (Egypt)

== Squad information ==
=== Playing statistics ===
No.	Pos	Nat	Player	Total		Ligue 1		Algerian Cup		Super Cup		Champions League	
No.	Pos	Nat	Player	Apps	Goals	Apps	Goals	Apps	Goals	Apps	Goals	Apps	Goals
Goalkeepers
1	GK	(Algeria) ALG	Moustapha Zeghba	31	0	24	0	1	0	1	0	5	0
30	GK	(Algeria) ALG	Khairi Barki	6	0	4	0	1	0	0	0	1	0
	GK	(Algeria) ALG	Salem Herrada	1	0	1	0	0	0	0	0	0	0
16	GK	(Algeria) ALG	Hocine Nasri	2	0	2	0	0	0	0	0	0	0
Defenders
24	DF	(Algeria) ALG	Mohamed Khoutir Ziti	29	0	21	0	1	0	1	0	6	0
5	DF	(Gabon) GAB	Franck Obambou	23	1	16	1	1	0	0	0	6	0
15	DF	(Algeria) ALG	Abdelkader Bedrane	28	2	20	1	2	0	1	0	5	1
3	DF	(Algeria) ALG	Chemseddine Nessakh	27	3	19	1	2	1	1	0	5	1
25	DF	(Algeria) ALG	Miloud Rebiai	34	3	25	2	2	0	1	0	6	1
4	DF	(Algeria) ALG	Anes Saad	31	0	26	0	1	0	1	0	3	0
34	DF	(Algeria) ALG	Aymen Attou	2	0	2	0	0	0	0	0	0	0
17	DF	(Algeria) ALG	Djamel Ibouzidène	5	0	5	0	0	0	0	0	0	0
	DF	(Algeria) ALG	Fayçal Benguerra	2	0	2	0	0	0	0	0	0	0
	DF	(Algeria) ALG	Mohamed Yasser Bouguessa	1	0	1	0	0	0	0	0	0	0
	DF	(Algeria) ALG	Abderrahim Deghmoum	3	0	3	0	0	0	0	0	0	0
	DF	(Algeria) ALG	Redha Hafri	2	0	2	0	0	0	0	0	0	0
	DF	(Algeria) ALG	Abdallah Salaheddine Rahba	2	0	2	0	0	0	0	0	0	0
Midfielders
8	DM	(Algeria) ALG	Hamza Aït Ouamar	32	2	25	2	2	0	1	0	4	0
6	DM	(Algeria) ALG	Ilyes Sidhoum	31	0	25	0	1	0	0	0	5	0
7	DM	(Algeria) ALG	Akram Djahnit	32	2	24	0	2	0	1	0	5	2
26	DM	(Algeria) ALG	Mustapha Boussif	10	0	7	0	1	0	0	0	2	0
27	DM	(Algeria) ALG	Zakaria Haddouche	33	9	25	6	2	0	1	0	5	3
21	MF	(Algeria) ALG	Samir Aiboud	18	1	16	1	0	0	0	0	2	0
	MF	(Algeria) ALG	Fouad Bourdim	1	0	1	0	0	0	0	0	0	0
	MF	(Algeria) ALG	Nedjm Eddine Charama	1	0	1	0	0	0	0	0	0	0
	MF	(Algeria) ALG	Wail Harikeche	1	0	1	0	0	0	0	0	0	0
Forwards
12	FW	(Algeria) ALG	Abdelhakim Amokrane	20	3	15	2	1	0	1	0	3	1
23	FW	(Algeria) ALG	Rachid Nadji	20	2	14	2	2	0	1	0	3	0
19	FW	(Algeria) ALG	Mourad Benayad	30	9	22	7	2	0	1	0	5	2
11	DF	(Algeria) ALG	Mohamed Islam Bakir	25	1	20	1	2	0	1	0	2	0
33	FW	(Algeria) ALG	Ismaïl Saïdi	5	0	4	0	0	0	0	0	1	0
26	FW	(Algeria) ALG	Sid Ahmed Aouedj	10	1	9	1	0	0	0	0	1	0
18	FW	(Algeria) ALG	Hamza Banouh	11	4	9	4	0	0	0	0	2	0
	FW	(Algeria) ALG	Youcef Chibane	8	1	7	0	1	1	0	0	0	0
Players transferred out during the season
10	DM	(Algeria) ALG	Abdelmoumene Djabou	19	2	17	2	1	0	1	0	0	0

Last updated: 11 June 2018
Source: fr.soccerway.com

== Squad list ==
As of August 25, 2017. Note: Flags indicate national team as defined under FIFA eligibility rules; some limited exceptions apply. Players may hold more than one non-FIFA nationality.

No.	Pos.	Nation	Player
1	GK	ALG	Moustapha Zeghba
3	DF	ALG	Chemseddine Nessakh
4	DF	ALG	Anes Saad
6	MF	ALG	Ilyes Sidhoum
7	MF	ALG	Akram Djahnit
8	MF	ALG	Hamza Aït Ouamar
9	FW	ALG	Youcef Chibane
10	MF	ALG	Abdelmoumene Djabou (captain)
11	MF	ALG	Mohamed Islam Bakir
12	FW	ALG	Abdelhakim Amokrane
15	DF	ALG	Abdelkader Bedrane
17	DF	ALG	Djamel Ibouzidène
19	MF	ALG	Mourad Benayad

No.	Pos.	Nation	Player
21	MF	ALG	Samir Aiboud
23	FW	ALG	Rachid Nadji
24	DF	ALG	Mohamed Khoutir Ziti
25	DF	ALG	Miloud Rebiai
27	MF	ALG	Zakaria Haddouche
30	GK	ALG	Khairi Barki
50	GK	ALG	Hocine Nasri
62	DF	ALG	Aymen Attou
-	DF	ALG	Ismaïl Saïdi
-	DF	ALG	Zied Chibout
-	MF	ALG	Mustapha Boussif
-	FW	ALG	Ali Bounader
-	MF	GAB	Franck Perrin Obambou

== Transfers ==
=== In ===
Date	Pos	Player	From club	Transfer fee	Source
8 July 2017	MF	(Algeria) Ilyes Sidhoum	USM Bel-Abbès	Free transfer	
9 July 2017	FW	(Algeria) Youcef Chibane	DRB Tadjenanet	Free transfer	
10 July 2017	DF	(Algeria) Chemseddine Nessakh	MC Oran	Free transfer	
15 July 2017	GK	(Algeria) Moustapha Zeghba	USM El Harrach	Free transfer	
15 July 2017	MF	(Algeria) Samir Aiboud	JS Kabylie	Free transfer	
25 July 2017	CB	(Gabon) Franck Obambou	(Gabon) AS Stade Mandji	Free transfer	
26 July 2017	FW	(Algeria) Mourad Benayad	RC Relizane	Free transfer	
26 July 2017	FW	(Algeria) Ali Bounadir		Free transfer	
31 December 2017	FW	(Algeria) Sid Ahmed Aouedj	MC Alger	Free transfer (Released)	

=== Out ===
First Team
Date	Pos	Player	From club	Transfer fee	Source
10 July 2017	DF	(Algeria) Sofiane Boutebba	NA Hussein Dey	Free transfer (Released)	
16 July 2017	GK	(Algeria) Abderraouf Belhani	JSM Bejaia	Free transfer	
16 July 2017	DF	(Algeria) Sofiane Bouchar	CR Belouizdad	Free transfer (Released)	
31 July 2017	MF	(Madagascar) Ibrahim Amada	MC Alger	Free transfer	
7 January 2018	FW	(Algeria) Youcef Chibane	MC Oran	Loan	
31 January 2018	MF	(Algeria) Abdelmoumene Djabou	(Saudi Arabia) Al-Nassr	Loan	
