= 2016–17 ES Sétif season =

ES Sétif
2016–17 season
- Chairman: Hassan Hammar
- Head coach: Abdelkader Amrani (until 14 December 2016); Kheïreddine Madoui (from 24 December 2016)
- Stadium: Stade 8 Mai 1945
- Ligue 1: Winners
- Algerian Cup: Runners-up
- Top goalscorer: League: Rachid Nadji; Akram Djahnit (8 goals); All: Akram Djahnit (9 goals)

In the 2016–17 season, ES Sétif competed in the Ligue 1 for the 47th season, as well as the Algerian Cup.

== Squad list ==
Players and squad numbers last updated on 18 November 2010.
Note: Flags indicate national team as has been defined under FIFA eligibility rules. Players may hold more than one non-FIFA nationality.

| No. | Nat. | Position | Name | Date of Birth (Age) | Signed from |
Goalkeepers
| 16 | (Algeria) | GK | Khairi Barki | 12 December 1990 (aged 25) | (Algeria) DRB Tadjenanet |
| 30 | (Algeria) | GK | Abderaouf Belhani | 26 November 1986 (aged 29) | (Algeria) NA Hussein Dey |
| 1 | (Algeria) | GK | Sofiane Khedairia | 1 April 1989 (aged 27) | (France) Le Mans FC |
| 40 | (Algeria) | GK | Mohamed Lotfi Osmani | 27 June 1996 (aged 20) | (Algeria) Reserve team |
Defenders
| 15 | (Algeria) | CB | Abdelkader Bedrane | 2 April 1992 (aged 24) | (Algeria) USM Blida |
| 20 | (Algeria) | CB | Ryad Kenniche | 30 April 1993 (aged 23) | (Algeria) USM El Harrach |
| 2 | (Algeria) | CB | Sofiane Bouchar | 21 May 1994 (aged 22) | (Algeria) Reserve team |
| 19 | (Algeria) | CB | Farid Mellouli | 7 July 1984 (aged 32) | (Algeria) ASO Chlef |
| 4 | (Algeria) | CB | Said Arroussi | 7 April 1990 (aged 26) | (Algeria) Reserve team |
| 3 | (Algeria) | LB | Farès Hachi | 5 November 1989 (aged 26) | (France) Grenoble Foot 38 |
| 22 | (Algeria) | LB | Sofiane Boutebba | 17 February 1989 (aged 27) | (Algeria) DRB Tadjenanet |
| 17 | (Algeria) | LB | Djamel Ibouzidène | 20 January 1994 (aged 22) | (France) Olympique Noisy-le-Sec |
| 24 | (Algeria) | RB | Mohamed Khoutir Ziti | 19 April 1990 (aged 26) | (Algeria) JS Kabylie |
| 62 | (Algeria) | RB | Aymen Attou | 8 October 1997 (aged 18) | (Algeria) Reserve team |
Midfielders
| 8 | (Algeria) | DM | Hamza Aït Ouamar | 6 December 1986 (aged 29) | (Algeria) USM El Harrach |
| 5 | (Cameroon) | DM | Azongha Tembeng | 13 September 1991 (aged 24) | (Algeria) MC El Eulma (loan) |
| 6 | (Madagascar) | DM | Ibrahim Amada | 28 February 1990 (aged 26) | (Algeria) USM El Harrach |
| 25 | (Algeria) | DM | Miloud Rebiai | 12 December 1993 (aged 22) | (Algeria) WA Tlemcen |
| 21 | (Algeria) | DM | Issam Baouz | 30 November 1990 (aged 25) | (France) Villemomble Sports |
| 13 | (Algeria) | CM | Sid Ali Lamri | 3 February 1991 (aged 25) | (Algeria) Reserve team |
| 31 | (Algeria) | DM | Mohamed Islam Bakir | 13 July 1996 (aged 20) | (Algeria) RC Arbaâ |
| 7 | (Algeria) | DM | Akram Djahnit | 3 April 1991 (aged 25) | (Algeria) Reserve team |
Forwards
| 12 | (Algeria) | ST | Abdelhakim Amokrane | 10 May 1994 (aged 22) | (Algeria) Reserve team |
| 11 | (Algeria) | ST | Adel Bougueroua | 14 June 1987 (aged 29) | (Algeria) CR Belouizdad |
| 10 | (Algeria) | RW | Abdelmoumene Djabou | 31 January 1987 (aged 29) | (Tunisia) Club Africain |
| 27 | (Algeria) | LW | Zakaria Haddouche | 19 August 1993 (aged 23) | (Algeria) ASO Chlef |
| 23 | (Algeria) | ST | Rachid Nadji | 15 April 1988 (aged 28) | (Algeria) USM Alger |
| 33 | (Algeria) | LW | Ismaïl Saïdi | 4 April 1997 (aged 19) | (Algeria) Reserve team |
| 14 | (Algeria) | ST | Hamza Boulemdaïs | 22 November 1982 (aged 33) | (Algeria) CS Constantine |
| 37 | (Algeria) | ST | Yasser Berbache | 8 February 1996 (aged 20) | (Algeria) Reserve team |

== Transfers ==
=== In ===
| Date | Pos | Player | From club | Transfer fee | Source |
|---|---|---|---|---|---|
| 9 June 2016 | DF | (Algeria) Mohamed Khoutir Ziti | JS Kabylie | Free transfer | |
| 9 June 2016 | GK | (Algeria) Khairi Barki | DRB Tadjenanet | Free transfer | |
| 13 June 2016 | FW | (Algeria) Rachid Nadji | USM Alger | Free transfer | |
| 14 June 2016 | DF | (Algeria) Abdelkader Bedrane | USM Blida | Free transfer | |
| 1 July 2016 | MF | (Algeria) Mohamed Islam Bakir | RC Arbaâ | Undisclosed | |
| 1 July 2016 | MF | (Cameroon) Azongha Tembeng | MC El Eulma | Loan | |
| 1 July 2016 | FW | (Algeria) Abdellah Daouadji | Paradou AC | Loan | |
| 1 July 2016 | FW | (Algeria) Adel Bougueroua | CR Belouizdad | Undisclosed | |
| 1 July 2016 | DF | (Algeria) Sofiane Boutebba | DRB Tadjenanet | Undisclosed | |
| 1 July 2016 | DF | (Algeria) Farid Mellouli | CS Constantine | Undisclosed | |
| 13 July 2016 | FW | (Algeria) Hamza Boulemdaïs | CS Constantine | Undisclosed | |

=== Out ===
| Date | Pos | Player | To club | Transfer fee | Source |
|---|---|---|---|---|---|
| 10 June 2016 | DF | (Algeria) Djamel Benlamri | (Saudi Arabia) Al Shabab | Undisclosed | |
| 22 June 2016 | MF | (Algeria) El Hedi Belameiri | CS Constantine | Free transfer | |
| 1 July 2016 | MF | (Central African Republic) Eudes Dagoulou | (Saudi Arabia) Al Wehda | Undisclosed | |
| 4 July 2016 | FW | (Algeria) Abdelmalek Ziaya | JS Kabylie | Undisclosed | |
| 24 July 2016 | MF | (Algeria) Mourad Delhoum | MC Oran | Free transfer | |
| 7 September 2016 | MF | (Algeria) Toufik Zerara | CS Constantine | Free transfer | |
| 12 January 2017 | FW | (Algeria) Abdellah Daouadji | NA Hussein Dey | Undisclosed | |
| 13 January 2017 | FW | (Algeria) Hamza Boulemdaïs | MO Béjaïa | Free transfer | |

== Competitions ==
=== Overview ===
| Competition | Record | | | | | | | | Started round | Final position / round | First match | Last match |
| Competition | G | W | D | L | GF | GA | GD | Win % | Started round | Final position / round | First match | Last match |
|---|---|---|---|---|---|---|---|---|---|---|---|---|
| Ligue 1 | 30 | 17 | 6 | 7 | 42 | 23 | +19 | 56.67 | —N/a | Winners | 20 August 2016 | 14 June 2017 |
| Algerian Cup | 6 | 4 | 1 | 1 | 16 | 5 | +11 | 66.67 | Round of 64 | Runners-up | 25 November 2016 | 5 July 2017 |
| Total | 36 | 21 | 7 | 8 | 58 | 28 | +30 | 58.33 | | | | |

== League table ==
| Pos | Team | Pld | W | D | L | GF | GA | GD | Pts | Qualification or relegation |
|---|---|---|---|---|---|---|---|---|---|---|
| 1 | ES Sétif (C) | 30 | 17 | 6 | 7 | 42 | 23 | +19 | 57 | Qualification for the 2018 CAF Champions League |
| 2 | MC Alger | 30 | 14 | 8 | 8 | 38 | 27 | +11 | 50 (Note: MC Alger ahead of USM Alger on head-to-head record: MCA–UAL 2–1, UAL–MCA 2–2.) | Qualification for the 2018 CAF Champions League |
| 3 | USM Alger | 30 | 14 | 8 | 8 | 50 | 31 | +19 | 50 | Qualification for the 2018 CAF Confederation Cup |
| 4 | USM Bel-Abbès | 30 | 14 | 6 | 10 | 37 | 33 | +4 | 48 | |
| 5 | JS Saoura | 30 | 12 | 9 | 9 | 34 | 30 | +4 | 45 | |

Updated to match(es) played on 14 June 2017. Source: DZFoot
Rules for classification: 1) points; 2) head-to-head points; 3) head-to-head goal difference; 4) goal difference; 5) total goals; 6) fairplay ranking; 7) playoff.
(C) Champions

=== Results summary ===
| Overall | | | | | | | | Home | | | | | | Away | | | | | |
| Pld | W | D | L | GF | GA | GD | Pts | W | D | L | GF | GA | GD | W | D | L | GF | GA | GD |
|---|---|---|---|---|---|---|---|---|---|---|---|---|---|---|---|---|---|---|---|
| 30 | 17 | 6 | 7 | 42 | 23 | +19 | 57 | 12 | 3 | 0 | 24 | 7 | +17 | 5 | 3 | 7 | 18 | 16 | +2 |

Last updated: 30 January 2016.
Source: Competitive matches

=== Results by round ===
| Round | 1 | 2 | 3 | 4 | 5 | 6 | 7 | 8 | 9 | 10 | 11 | 12 | 13 | 14 | 15 | 16 | 17 | 18 | 19 | 20 | 21 | 22 | 23 | 24 | 25 | 26 | 27 | 28 | 29 | 30 |
|---|---|---|---|---|---|---|---|---|---|---|---|---|---|---|---|---|---|---|---|---|---|---|---|---|---|---|---|---|---|---|
| Ground | A | H | A | H | A | H | A | H | A | H | A | A | H | A | H | H | A | H | A | H | A | H | A | H | A | H | H | A | H | A |
| Result | D | W | W | D | L | W | D | W | W | D | L | L | W | L | W | W | L | W | D | W | W | W | W | W | L | D | W | W | W | L |
| Position | 5 | 3 | 2 | 3 | 5 | 4 | 4 | 4 | 2 | 3 | 4 | 5 | 5 | 5 | 4 | 2 | 2 | 2 | 3 | 2 | 1 | 1 | 1 | 1 | 1 | 1 | 1 | 1 | 1 | 1 |

Updated to match(es) played on 30 January 2016. Source: Competitive matches
A = Away; H = Home; W = Win; D = Draw; L = Loss

=== Matches ===
Win Draw Loss

| 20 August 2016 Round 1 | CS Constantine | 2–2 | ES Sétif | Constantine |
| 21:00 | Meghni 23', 45' | Soccerway report Live TV: EPTV Terrestre | 40' (pen.) Nadji; 75' Djahnit | Stadium: Stade Mohamed Hamlaoui; Referee: Lahlou Benbraham |

| 27 August 2016 Round 2 | ES Sétif | 2–1 | CR Belouizdad | Sétif |
| 19:00 | Bakir 34'; Nadji 59' | Report; Live TV: None | 70' Naamani | Stadium: Stade 8 Mai 1945; Attendance: 0 (close doors); Referee: Mehdi Abid Charef |

| 10 September 2016 Round 3 | Olympique de Médéa | 1–3 | ES Sétif | Médéa |
| 17:00 | Addadi 82' | Report; Live TV: Algérie 3 | 1' (pen.) Nadji; 24' Aït Ouamar; 30' (pen.) Djabou | Stadium: Stade Imam Lyes de Médéa; Referee: Farouk Houasnia |

| 17 September 2016 Round 4 | ES Sétif | 0–0 | JS Kabylie | Sétif |
| 17:45 | | Report; Live TV: Algérie 3 / Canal Algérie | | Stadium: Stade 8 Mai 1945; Referee: Farouk Mial |

| 24 September 2016 Round 5 | USM Bel-Abbès | 2–1 | ES Sétif | Sidi Bel Abbès |
| 19:00 | Khali 56'; Balegh 58' | Report; Live TV: None | 69' Djahnit | Stadium: Stade 24 Fevrier 1956; Referee: Hamza Bouslimani |

| 1 October 2016 Round 6 | ES Sétif | 2–0 | MC Alger | Sétif |
| 17:00 | Haddouche 3'; Nadji 19' (pen.) | Report; Live TV: Algérie 3 / TV Tamazight 4 | | Stadium: Stade 8 Mai 1945; Referee: Mohamed Benouza |

| 14 October 2016 Round 7 | RC Relizane | 0–0 | ES Sétif | Relizane |
| 16:00 | | Report; Live TV: EPTV Terrestre / Canal Algérie | | Stadium: Stade Tahar Zoughari; Referee: Said Aouina |

| 22 October 2016 Round 8 | ES Sétif | 2–0 | CA Batna | Sétif |
| 17:00 | Djahnit 10'; Amokrane 86' | Report; Live TV: Canal Algérie | | Stadium: Stade 8 Mai 1945; Referee: Abderrezzak Arab |

| 29 October 2016 Round 9 | NA Hussein Dey | 0–2 | ES Sétif | Mohamed Belouizdad |
| 16:00 | | Report; Live TV: TV Tamazight 4 | 44' Amokrane; 82' Nadji | Stadium: Stade 20 Août 1955; Referee: Ahmed Bouzrar |

| 3 November 2016 Round 10 | ES Sétif | 0–0 | MC Oran | Sétif |
| 17:00 | | Report; Live TV: TV Tamazight 4 / Canal Algérie | | Stadium: Stade 8 Mai 1945; Referee: Lahlou Benbraham |

| 11 November 2016 Round 11 | USM El Harrach | 1–0 | ES Sétif | El Harrach |
| 15:30 | Mellal 58' | Report; Live TV: None | | Stadium: Stade 1er Novembre 1954; Referee: Mohamed Boukhalfa |

| 19 November 2016 Round 12 | JS Saoura | 2–1 | ES Sétif | Béchar |
| 19:00 | Djallit 41' (pen.); Zaidi 90+3' | Report; Live TV: None | 71' Bedrane | Stadium: Stade 20 Août 1955; Referee: Merzak Halalchi |

| 2 December 2016 Round 13 | ES Sétif | 4–2 | MO Béjaïa | Sétif |
| 16:00 | Haddouche 5', 24'; Djabou 48' (pen.); Amokrane 66' | Report; Live TV: TV Tamazight 4 / Canal Algérie | 80', 90+3' Messadia | Stadium: Stade 8 Mai 1945; Referee: Mehdi Abid Charef |

| 9 December 2016 Round 14 | USM Alger | 3–1 | ES Sétif | Bologhine |
| 16:00 | Chafaï 12'; Meftah 25'; Meziane 78' | Report; Live TV: EPTV Terrestre / TV Tamazight 4 / Algérie 3 | 57' (pen.) Amada | Stadium: Omar Hamadi Stadium; Referee: Mohamed Boukhalfa |

| 23 December 2016 Round 15 | ES Sétif | 1–0 | DRB Tadjenanet | Sétif |
| 16:00 | Djahnit 23' | Report; Live TV: TV Tamazight 4 / Algérie 3 | | Stadium: Stade 8 Mai 1945; Referee: Mohamed Benouza |

| 21 January 2017 Round 16 | ES Sétif | 1–0 | CS Constantine | Sétif |
| 15:00 | Kenniche 77' | Report; Live TV: None | | Stadium: Stade 8 Mai 1945; Attendance: 0 (close doors); Referee: Lahlou Benbraham |

| 25 March 2017 Round 17 | CR Belouizdad | 1–0 | ES Sétif | Mohamed Belouizdad |
| 15:00; Match rescheduled due to share some of their players in the African Cup and World Cup military | Hamia 88' (pen.) | Report; Live TV: None | | Stadium: August 20, 1955 Stadium; Referee: Mustapha Ghorbal |

| 3 February 2017 Round 18 | ES Sétif | 1–0 | Olympique de Médéa | Sétif |
| 16:00 | Djahnit 20' | Report; Live TV: Algérie 3 | | Stadium: Stade 8 Mai 1945; Referee: Hamza Bouslimani |

| 7 February 2017 Round 19 | JS Kabylie | 1–1 | ES Sétif | Tizi Ouzou |
| 16:00 | Boulaouidet 10' (pen.) | Report; Live TV: EPTV Terrestre / TV Tamazight 4 | 45' Ziti | Stadium: November 1, 1954 Stadium; Referee: Lotfi Bekouassa |

| 18 February 2017 Round 20 | ES Sétif | 1–0 | USM Bel-Abbès | Sétif |
| 16:00 | Nadji 69' | Report; Live TV: Algérie 3 / Canal Algérie | | Stadium: Stade 8 Mai 1945; Referee: Said Aouina |

| 24 February 2017 Round 21 | MC Alger | 1–2 | ES Sétif | Algiers |
| 17:45 | Mansouri 23' | Report; Live TV: Canal Algérie / TV Tamazight 4 / beIN Sports | 48' (pen.) Nadji; 78' Tembeng | Stadium: July 5, 1962 Stadium; Referee: Mehdi Abid Charef |

| 3 March 2017 Round 22 | ES Sétif | 3–1 | RC Relizane | Sétif |
| 16:00 | Ziti 49'; Tembeng 61'; Aït Ouamar 65' | Report; Live TV: TV Tamazight 4 / Algérie 3 | 10' Zidane | Stadium: Stade 8 Mai 1945; Referee: Abderrezzak Arab |

| 10 March 2017 Round 23 | CA Batna | 0–2 | ES Sétif | Batna |
| 15:00 | | Report; Live TV: None | 65' Aït Ouamar; 90+4' Amokrane | Stadium: Mustapha Seffouhi Stadium; Attendance: 0 (close doors); Referee: Farouk Mial |

| 17 March 2017 Round 24 | ES Sétif | 4–2 | NA Hussein Dey | Sétif |
| 18:00 | Nadji 11'; Bougueroua 29'; Aït Ouamar 51'; Djahnit 72' | Report; Live TV: None | 45' Bendebka; 90+4' Daouadji | Stadium: Stade 8 Mai 1945; Referee: Mohamed Boukhalfa |

| 6 May 2017 Round 25 | MC Oran | 1–0 | ES Sétif | Oran |
| 16:00 | Chérif 77' | Report; Live TV: None | | Stadium: Ahmed Zabana Stadium; Attendance: 0 (close doors); Referee: Hamza Bouslimani |

| 13 May 2017 Round 26 | ES Sétif | 0–0 | USM El Harrach | Sétif |
| 18:00 | | Report; Live TV: TV Tamazight 4 | | Stadium: Stade 8 Mai 1945; Referee: Lahlou Benbraham |

| 20 May 2017 Round 27 | ES Sétif | 1–0 | JS Saoura | Sétif |
| 16:00 | Djahnit 85' | Report; Live TV: None | | Stadium: Stade 8 Mai 1945; Referee: Abderrezzak Arab |

| 7 June 2017 Round 28 | MO Béjaïa | 0–3 | ES Sétif | Béjaïa |
| 17:00 | | Report; Live TV: None | 35' Amokrane; 69' Rebiai; 85' Ziti | Stadium: Maghrebi Unity Stadium; Referee: Mohamed Benabdellah |

| 10 June 2017 Round 29 | ES Sétif | 2–1 | USM Alger | Sétif |
| 22:30 | Djahnit 5'; Djabou 52' | Report; Live TV: TV Tamazight 4 / beIN Sports / Al-Kass Sports | 75' Sayoud | Stadium: Stade 8 Mai 1945; Referee: Mohamed Saïdi |

| 14 June 2017 Round 30 | DRB Tadjenanet | 1–0 | ES Sétif | Tadjenanet |
| 17:00 | Noubli 43' | Report; Live TV: None | | Stadium: Lahoua Smaïl Stadium; Referee: Merzoug Brahimi |

=== Algerian Cup ===
| 25 November 2016 Round of 64 | ES Sétif | 2–0 | SCM Oran | Sétif |
| 16:00 | Bouchar 52'; Amada 55' (pen.) | Report; Live TV: None | | Stadium: Stade 8 Mai 1945; Referee: Dafri, Kachi, Benhamouda |

| 15 December 2016 Round of 32 | DRB Staouéli | 0–5 | ES Sétif | Bologhine |
| 16:30 | | Report; Live TV: TV Tamazight 4 / Canal Algérie | Amokrane 32', 46'; Djahnit 34'; Aït Ouamar 61'; Bekir 84' | Stadium: Omar Hamadi Stadium; Referee: Ouali, Mezaach, Dilmi |

| 27 December 2016 Round of 16 | ES Sétif | 2–2 (a.e.t.) (7–6 p) | JS Saoura | Sétif |
| 17:00 | Aït Ouamar 11'; Djabou 76' (pen.) | Report; Live TV: Algérie 3 / Canal Algérie | Hamia 60'; Djallit 65' | Stadium: Stade 8 Mai 1945; Referee: Abid Charef, Hamlaoui, Gourari |
| | Penalties |
| | Aït Ouamar (penalty scored); Lamri (penalty missed); Ziti (penalty scored); Bouchar (penalty scored); Djabou (penalty scored); Tembeng (penalty scored); Bekir (penalty scored); Rebiai (penalty scored) | | (penalty missed) Djallit; (penalty scored) Bourdim; (penalty scored) Hamia; (penalty scored) Bousmaha; (penalty scored) Bapidi Fils; (penalty scored) Merbah; (penalty scored) Maaziz; (penalty missed) Toubal |

| 31 March 2017 Quarter-finals | ES Sétif | 4–0 | US Tébessa | Sétif |
| 16:00 | Kenniche 4', 38'; Bedrane 47'; Haddouche 81' | Report; Live TV: EPTV Terrestre / Canal Algérie | | Stadium: Stade 8 Mai 1945; Referee: Helalachi, Bounoua, Azrine |

| 24 June 2017 Semi-finals | MC Alger | 2–3 (a.e.t.) | ES Sétif | Bologhine |
| 22:30 | Aouedj 30'; Boudebouda 116' | Report; Live TV: Canal Algérie / TV Tamazight 4 / Al-Kass Sports | 28' Ziti; 99' Bedrane; 115' Djabou | Stadium: Stade Omar Hamadi; Referee: Abderrezzak Arab |

| 5 July 2017 Final | CR Belouizdad | 1–0 (a.e.t.) | ES Sétif | Algiers |
| 16:45 | Yahia-Chérif 117' | Report; Live TV: beIN Sports / Canal Algérie / Al Kass Sports one / Algérie 3 / Jordan Sports / Abu Dhabi Sports 1 / Dubai Sports 1 / Tamazight 4 | | Stadium: Stade 5 Juillet 1962; Attendance: 50,000; Referee: Mustapha Ghorbal |

== Squad information ==
=== Playing statistics ===
| No. | Pos | Nat | Player | Total | | Ligue 1 | | Algerian Cup | |
| No. | Pos | Nat | Player | Apps | Goals | Apps | Goals | Apps | Goals |
Goalkeepers
| 30 | GK | (Algeria) ALG | Khairi Barki | 13 | 0 | 10 | 0 | 3 | 0 |
| 16 | GK | (Algeria) ALG | Abderaouf Belhani | 1 | 0 | 1 | 0 | 0 | 0 |
| 1 | GK | (Algeria) ALG | Sofiane Khedairia | 23 | 0 | 20 | 0 | 3 | 0 |
| 40 | GK | (Algeria) ALG | Mohamed Lotfi Osmani | 1 | 0 | 1 | 0 | 0 | 0 |
Defenders
| 4 | DF | (Algeria) ALG | Said Arroussi | 6 | 0 | 5 | 0 | 1 | 0 |
| 62 | DF | (Algeria) ALG | Aymen Attou | 1 | 0 | 1 | 0 | 0 | 0 |
| 15 | DF | (Algeria) ALG | Abdelkader Bedrane | 31 | 3 | 26 | 1 | 5 | 2 |
| 2 | DF | (Algeria) ALG | Sofiane Bouchar | 15 | 1 | 9 | 0 | 6 | 1 |
| 22 | DF | (Algeria) ALG | Sofiane Boutebba | 9 | 0 | 7 | 0 | 2 | 0 |
| 17 | DF | (Algeria) ALG | Djamel Ibouzidène | 7 | 0 | 6 | 0 | 1 | 0 |
| 20 | DF | (Algeria) ALG | Ryad Kenniche | 25 | 2 | 22 | 0 | 3 | 2 |
| 19 | DF | (Algeria) ALG | Farid Mellouli | 3 | 0 | 3 | 0 | 0 | 0 |
| 25 | DF | (Algeria) ALG | Miloud Rebiai | 24 | 1 | 18 | 1 | 6 | 0 |
| 24 | DF | (Algeria) ALG | Mohamed Khoutir Ziti | 28 | 4 | 25 | 3 | 3 | 1 |
Midfielders
| 8 | MF | (Algeria) ALG | Hamza Aït Ouamar | 32 | 6 | 27 | 4 | 5 | 2 |
| 6 | MF | (Madagascar) MAD | Ibrahim Amada | 17 | 2 | 14 | 1 | 3 | 1 |
| | MF | (Algeria) ALG | Issam Baouz | 1 | 0 | 1 | 0 | 0 | 0 |
| | MF | (Algeria) ALG | Achraf Boudrama | 1 | 0 | 1 | 0 | 0 | 0 |
| | MF | (Algeria) ALG | Mustapha Boussif | 1 | 0 | 1 | 0 | 0 | 0 |
| 10 | MF | (Algeria) ALG | Abdelmoumene Djabou | 32 | 5 | 27 | 3 | 5 | 2 |
| 7 | MF | (Algeria) ALG | Akram Djahnit | 32 | 9 | 27 | 8 | 5 | 1 |
| 13 | MF | (Algeria) ALG | Sid Ali Lamri | 27 | 0 | 22 | 0 | 5 | 0 |
| | MF | (Algeria) ALG | Ramzi Messaoud Salem | 1 | 0 | 1 | 0 | 0 | 0 |
| 5 | MF | (Cameroon) CMR | Azongha Tembeng Abenego | 24 | 2 | 20 | 2 | 4 | 0 |
| | MF | (Algeria) ALG | Khaled Yagoubi | 2 | 0 | 1 | 0 | 1 | 0 |
Forwards
| 12 | FW | (Algeria) ALG | Abdelhakim Amokrane | 26 | 8 | 20 | 6 | 6 | 2 |
| 31 | FW | (Algeria) ALG | Mohamed Islam Bakir | 29 | 2 | 24 | 1 | 5 | 1 |
| 11 | FW | (Algeria) ALG | Adel Bougueroua | 13 | 1 | 10 | 1 | 3 | 0 |
| | FW | (Algeria) ALG | Zied Chibout | 1 | 0 | 1 | 0 | 0 | 0 |
| 27 | FW | (Algeria) ALG | Zakaria Haddouche | 27 | 4 | 22 | 3 | 5 | 1 |
| 23 | FW | (Algeria) ALG | Rachid Nadji | 17 | 8 | 17 | 8 | 0 | 0 |
| 33 | FW | (Algeria) ALG | Ismaïl Saïdi | 6 | 0 | 4 | 0 | 2 | 0 |
Players transferred out during the season
| | FW | (Algeria) ALG | Hamza Boulemdaïs | 12 | 0 | 10 | 0 | 2 | 0 |

Last updated: 11 June 2018
Source: fr.soccerway.com
