= 2017 Algerian Super Cup =

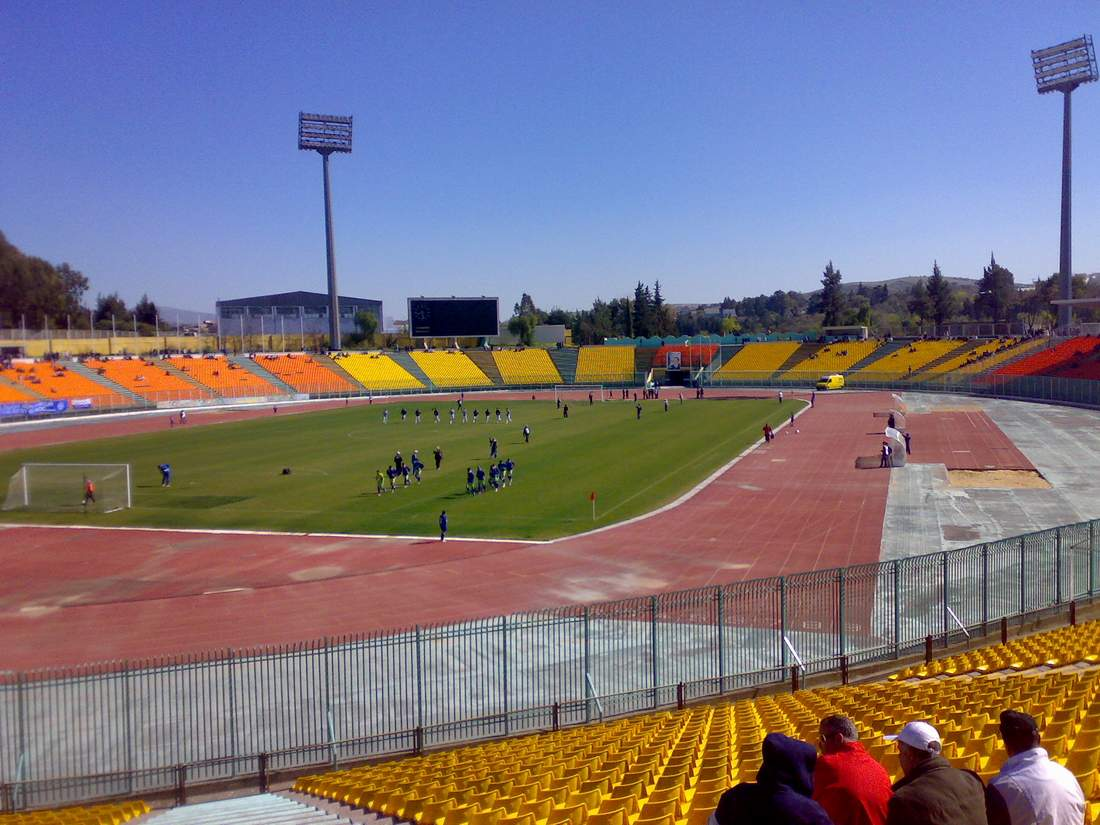
- Chahid Hamlaoui Stadium hosted the match
ES Sétif	CR Belouizdad
Ligue 1	Algerian Cup
0	0
- ES Sétif won 4–2 on penalties
- Date: 1 November 2017
- Venue: Chahid Hamlaoui Stadium, Constantine
- Man of the Match: Zakaria Draoui
- Referee: Abderrezzak Arab
- Attendance: 25,000
- Weather: Cloudy; 18 °C (64 °F); 57% humidity

The 2017 Algerian Super Cup was the 11th edition of the Algerian Super Cup, a football match contested by the winners of the 2016–17 Algerian Ligue Professionnelle 1 and 2016–17 Algerian Cup competitions. It is known as the Mobilis Supercoupe d'Algérie 2017 due to the start of a sponsorship deal with Mobilis ATM. The match was played on November 1, 2017, at Chahid Hamlaoui Stadium in Constantine. It was between Ligue 1 winners ES Sétif and Algerian Cup winners CR Belouizdad.

== Match ==
=== Pre-match ===
The match between the two teams are the first of its kind in the Super Cup. ES Sétif looking for the second in the fourth final and the CR Belouizdad for the first in the second final after 22 years, as a whole season play on November 1, the date of the outbreak of the Algerian revolution was chosen Stadium of the East Capital Stade Mohamed Hamlaoui theater of this confrontation second after 2015. The two teams met in the final of the Algerian Cup last season and won with Al Shabab getting a single goal. But this season the coach changed from Moroccan Badou Zaki to Serbian Ivica Todorov. Also ES Sétif was looking for a rehabilitation after they were deprived of the league and cup Doubles last season.

=== Summary ===
With a draw 0-0 the two teams go straight into a penalty shootout. In the first shot of the CR Belouizdad, they were lost by defender Namani and in the next throw, ES Sétif captain Abdelmoumene Djabou lost the second shot, after which the two teams scored all their kicks until the fourth shot, where the CR Belouizdad striker Mohamed Amine Hamia lost to give Hamza Aït Ouamar a chance to score the winning kick for the title. And after the end of the matches CR Belouizdad player Zakaria Draoui won the best player award from the organizing committee. Then the Minister of Youth and Sports El Hadi Ould Ali gave the Super Cup to the captain Djabou. And in the presence of the President of the Ligue de Football Professionnel Mahfoud Kerbadj and the President of the FAF Kheiredine Zetchi, both teams received 100 million dinars equivalent to $86,000 from the official sponsor of the competition Mobilis ATM. Coach Kheïreddine Madoui became the winner of the Super Cup for the second time in its history after the first in 2015.

== Match details ==
1 November 2017
17:00

ES Sétif	0–0	CR Belouizdad
	Report
Penalties
Nadji (penalty scored); Djabou (penalty missed); Djahnit (penalty scored); Haddouche (penalty scored); Aït Ouamar (penalty scored)	4–2	(penalty missed) Namani; (penalty scored) Aichi; (penalty scored) Bellaili; (penalty missed) Hamia

Chahid Hamlaoui Stadium, Constantine
Attendance: 25,000
Referee: Abderrezzak Arab

GK	1	(Algeria) Moustapha Zeghba
DF	24	(Algeria) Mohamed Khoutir Ziti
DF	3	(Algeria) Chemseddine Nessakh	(substituted off) 70'
DF	4	(Algeria) Anes Saad
DF	15	(Algeria) Abdelkader Bedrane
DF	25	(Algeria) Miloud Rebiai
MF	27	(Algeria) Zakaria Haddouche
MF	8	(Algeria) Hamza Aït Ouamar
MF	10	(Algeria) Abdelmoumene Djabou (c)
MF	11	(Algeria) Mohamed Islam Bakir	(substituted off) 80'
FW	19	(Algeria) Mourad Benayad	(substituted off) 59'
Substitutes :
MF	7	(Algeria) Akram Djahnit	(substituted on) 70'
MF	5	(Gabon) Franck Obambou
MF	21	(Algeria) Samir Aiboud
FW	23	(Algeria) Rachid Nadji	(substituted on) 80'
MF	6	(Algeria) Ilyes Sidhoum
FW	12	(Algeria) Abdelhakim Amokrane	(substituted on) 59'
GK	30	(Algeria) Khairi Barki
Manager :
(Algeria) Kheïreddine Madoui

GK	30	(Algeria) Abdelkader Salhi
DF	2	(Algeria) Sofiane Bouchar
DF	4	(Algeria) Mohamed Namani
DF	17	(Algeria) Amir Bellaili
MF	6	(Algeria) Mohamed Heriat
MF	14	(Algeria) Zakaria Draoui
DF	13	(Algeria) Hamida Zenasni
FW	9	(Algeria) Mohamed Amine Hamia
FW	10	(Algeria) Sid Ali Lakroum	(substituted off) 82'
FW	11	(Algeria) Mounir Aichi
MF	18	(Algeria) Abdelhak Sameur	(substituted off) 90+5'
Substitutes :
DF	23	(Algeria) Hakim Khoudi	(substituted on) 90+5'
FW	28	(Algeria) Mohamed Adam Izghouti
FW	56	(Algeria) Youcef Bechou
MF	7	(Algeria) Said Sayah
MF	15	(Algeria) Réda Batouche	(substituted on) 82'
DF	3	(Algeria) Hmida Salah
GK	1	(Algeria) Sofiane Kacem
Manager :
(Serbia) Ivica Todorov

Man of the Match:
Zakaria Draoui (CR Belouizdad)

Assistant referees:
Akrem Zerhouni
Samir Bioud
Fourth official:
Hamza Bouslimani

Match rules

- 90 minutes.
- Penalty shoot-out if scores level.
- Seven named substitutes, of which up to three may be used.

== See also ==
- 2016–17 Algerian Ligue Professionnelle 1
- 2016–17 Algerian Cup
