= 2017–18 CR Belouizdad season =

CR Belouizdad
2017–18 season
- Chairman: Mohamed Bouhafs
- Head coach: Ivica Todorov (from 25 July 2017) (until 27 December 2017); Rachid Taoussi (from 27 December 2017)
- Stadium: Stade 20 Août 1955
- Ligue 1: 12th
- Algerian Cup: Round of 16
- Super Cup: Runners–up
- CAF Confederation Cup: Play-off round
- Top goalscorer: League: Zakaria Draoui; Sid Ali Lakroum (4); All: Zakaria Draoui; Sid Ali Lakroum (5)

In the 2017–18 season, CR Belouizdad competed in Ligue 1 for the 52nd season, as well as the Algerian Cup.

== Squad list ==
Players and squad numbers last updated on 18 November 2018.
Note: Flags indicate national team as has been defined under FIFA eligibility rules. Players may hold more than one non-FIFA nationality.

No.	Nat.	Position	Name	Date of birth (age)	Signed from
Goalkeepers
Defenders
Midfielders
Forwards

== Competitions ==
=== Overview ===
Competition	Record								Started round	Final position / round	First match	Last match
Competition	G	W	D	L	GF	GA	GD	Win %	Started round	Final position / round	First match	Last match
Ligue 1	30	7	15	8	24	27	−3	23.33	—N/a	12th	26 August 2017	19 May 2018
Algerian Cup	3	2	0	1	6	2	+4	66.67	Round of 64	Round of 16	30 December 2017	1 February 2018
Super Cup	1	0	1	0	0	0	+0	0.00	Final	Runners–up	1 November 2017	
Confederation Cup	6	2	2	2	6	3	+3	33.33	First round	Play-off round	9 February 2018	17 April 2018
Total	40	11	18	11	36	32	+4	27.50				

Updated to match played 19 May 2018
Source: Competitions

== League table ==
Pos	Team	Pld	W	D	L	GF	GA	GD	Pts	Qualification or relegation
10	USM Bel Abbès (Note: USM Bel Abbès were deducted 6 points. FIFA's decision was taken at its meeting on 9 June 2017, ordering the club to pay the amount due to the player Jessy Mayele as well as a fine of CHF 15,000 (15,000 Swiss francs).)	30	12	7	11	32	31	+1	37 (Note: Ranked on head-to-head results.)	Qualification for the 2018–19 Confederation Cup
11	JS Kabylie	30	8	12	10	34	39	−5	36 (Note: Ranked on head-to-head results.)	
12	CR Belouizdad	30	7	15	8	24	27	−3	36	
13	Olympique de Médéa	30	8	12	10	23	32	−9	36	
14	US Biskra (R)	30	9	7	14	23	30	−7	34	Relegation to Algerian Ligue Professionnelle 2

Updated to match(es) played on 19 May 2018. Source: DZFoot
Rules for classification: 1) points; 2) head-to-head points; 3) head-to-head goal difference; 4) goal difference; 5) total goals; 6) fairplay ranking; 7) playoff.
(R) Relegated

=== Results summary ===
Overall								Home						Away					
Pld	W	D	L	GF	GA	GD	Pts	W	D	L	GF	GA	GD	W	D	L	GF	GA	GD
30	7	15	8	21	27	−6	36	5	7	3	12	9	+3	2	8	5	9	18	−9

Last updated: 30 January 2016.
Source: Competitive matches

=== Results by round ===
Round	1	2	3	4	5	6	7	8	9	10	11	12	13	14	15	16	17	18	19	20	21	22	23	24	25	26	27	28	29	30
Ground	H	A	H	A	H	H	A	H	A	H	A	H	A	H	A	A	H	A	H	A	A	H	A	H	A	H	A	H	A	H
Result	W	W	W	D	D	D	D	D	L	D	D	D	D	L	L	L	L	D	W	L	D	D	L	W	W	D	D	W	D	L
Position	3	1	1	1	1	2	4	3	5	5	7	7	7	8	10	11	12	11	11	12	11	11	12	10	9	9	11	10	10	11

Source: Competitive matches
A = Away; H = Home; W = Win; D = Draw; L = Loss

=== Matches ===
Win Draw Loss

25 August 2017 Round 1	CR Belouizdad	2–0	USM Bel-Abbès	Belouizdad
17:00	Lakroum 58'; Hamia 69'	Soccerway report Live TV: EPTV Terrestre / Algérie 3		Stadium: Stade 20 Août 1955; Referee: Abderrezzak Arab

8 September 2017 Round 2	USM El Harrach	1–2	CR Belouizdad	Bologhine
18:00	Banouh 90+3' (pen.)	Soccerway report Live TV: None	76' Chebira; 82' Aribi	Stadium: Omar Hamadi Stadium; Attendance: 0 (close doors); Referee: Mehdi Abid Charef; Man of the Match: Lakroum

12 September 2017 Round 3	CR Belouizdad	2–0	MC Alger	Belouizdad
17:00	Hamia 45+2'; Aribi 90+3'	Soccerway report Live TV: Canal Algérie		Stadium: August 20, 1955 Stadium; Referee: Lotfi Bekouassa; Man of the Match: Draoui

23 September 2017 Round 4	US Biskra	0–0	CR Belouizdad	Biskra
17:00		Soccerway report Live TV: None		Stadium: El Alia Sports Complex; Referee: Mustapha Ghorbal

30 September 2017 Round 5	CR Belouizdad	0–0	ES Sétif	Belouizdad
17:00		report Live TV: Algérie 3		Stadium: Stade 20 Août 1955; Referee: Mohamed Boukhalfa

13 October 2017 Round 6	CR Belouizdad	1–1	JS Saoura	Belouizdad
16:00	Aichi 18'	Soccerway report Live TV: EPTV Terrestre / Algérie 3	22' Djallit	Stadium: Stade 20 Août 1955; Referee: Said Aouina

17 October 2017 Round 7	Olympique de Médéa	1–1	CR Belouizdad	Médéa
16:00	Mesfar 60'	Soccerway report Live TV: Canal Algérie	3' Aribi	Stadium: Stade Imam Lyes de Médéa; Referee: Lahlou Benbraham

21 October 2017 Round 8	CR Belouizdad	0–0	CS Constantine	Belouizdad
16:00		Soccerway report Live TV: Algérie 3		Stadium: Stade 20 Août 1955; Referee: Mustapha Ghorbal

28 October 2017 Round 9	USM Alger	4–0	CR Belouizdad	Bologhine
17:00	Benmoussa 7'; Hammar 13' (pen.); Darfalou 23' (pen.), 40'	Soccerway report Live TV: Canal Algérie / TV Tamazight 4		Stadium: Omar Hamadi Stadium; Referee: Lotfi Bekouassa

7 November 2017 Round 10	CR Belouizdad	0–0	MC Oran	Belouizdad
16:00		Soccerway report Live TV: None		Stadium: Stade 20 Août 1955; Attendance: 0 (close doors); Referee: Mehdi Abid Charef

11 November 2017 Round 11	JS Kabylie	2–2	CR Belouizdad	Tizi Ouzou
16:00	Yettou 4'; Benaldjia 46'	Soccerway report Live TV: Canal Algérie	22' Bellaili; 38' Lakroum	Stadium: November 1, 1954 Stadium; Referee: Rafik Achouri

18 November 2017 Round 12	CR Belouizdad	1–1	USM Blida	Belouizdad
16:00	Namani 4'	Soccerway report Live TV: Canal Algérie	37' Ghacha	Stadium: Stade 20 Août 1955; Referee: Mohamed Saïdi

2 December 2017 Round 13	Paradou AC	0–0	CR Belouizdad	Bologhine
17:00		Soccerway report Live TV: None		Stadium: Omar Hamadi Stadium; Referee: Ahmed Bouzrar

9 December 2017 Round 14	CR Belouizdad	0–2	NA Hussein Dey	Belouizdad
16:00		Soccerway report Live TV: Canal Algérie / Algérie 3	54' Brahimi; 69' Khacef	Stadium: Stade 20 Août 1955; Referee: Lotfi Bekouassa

15 December 2017 Round 15	DRB Tadjenanet	3–0	CR Belouizdad	Tadjenanet
15:00	Khaled 10'; Dousse 79'; Belmokhtar 89'	Soccerway report Live TV: EPTV Terrestre / TV Tamazight 4		Stadium: Lahoua Smaïl Stadium; Referee: Mustapha Ghorbal

6 January 2018 Round 16	USM Bel-Abbès	1–0	CR Belouizdad	Sidi Bel Abbès
16:00	Belhocini 4'	Soccerway report Live TV: Canal Algérie		Stadium: Stade 24 Fevrier 1956; Referee: Merzoug Brahimi

19 January 2018 Round 17	CR Belouizdad	0–1	USM El Harrach	Belouizdad
16:00		Soccerway report Live TV: Algérie 3 / TV Tamazight 4	54' Bouguèche	Stadium: Stade 20 Août 1955; Referee: Nabil Boukhalfa

27 January 2018 Round 18	MC Alger	0–0	CR Belouizdad	Algiers
17:00		Soccerway report Live TV: Canal Algérie		Stadium: July 5, 1962 Stadium; Referee: Ahmed Bouzrar

6 February 2018 Round 19	CR Belouizdad	1–0	US Biskra	Belouizdad
18:00	Bellaili 90+2'	Soccerway report Live TV: None		Stadium: Stade 20 Août 1955; Referee: Missoum Benabdellah

15 February 2018 Round 20	ES Sétif	2–1	CR Belouizdad	Sétif
17:00	Benayad 59'; Haddouche 87'	Soccerway report Live TV: None	7' Namani	Stadium: Stade 8 Mai 1945; Referee: Mehdi Abid Charef

24 February 2018 Round 21	JS Saoura	1–1	CR Belouizdad	Béchar
16:00	Hammia 25'	Soccerway report Live TV: None	37' Draoui	Stadium: Stade 20 Août 1955; Referee: Oukil

1 March 2018 Round 22	CR Belouizdad	0–0	Olympique de Médéa	Belouizdad
17:00		Soccerway report Live TV: EPTV Terrestre / Canal Algérie		Stadium: Stade 20 Août 1955; Referee: Mustapha Ghorbal

10 March 2018 Round 23	CS Constantine	1–0	CR Belouizdad	Constantine
16:00	Zerara 6'	Soccerway report Live TV: None		Stadium: Stade Mohamed Hamlaoui; Referee: Nabil Boukhalfa

30 March 2018 Round 24	CR Belouizdad	1–0	USM Alger	Belouizdad
15:00	Bellaili 35' (pen.)	Soccerway report Live TV: Algérie 3		Stadium: Stade 20 Août 1955; Referee: Farouk Mial

13 April 2018 Round 25	MC Oran	0–3	CR Belouizdad	Oran
16:00		Soccerway report Live TV: Canal Algérie / Algérie 3	35', 78' Draoui	Stadium: Ahmed Zabana Stadium; Referee: Boubekeur Zouaoui
Note: The game was suspended in the 81st minute, it was decided to give lost match to MC Oran (who had lost 0-2 anyway), with a score of 0-3 for CR Belouizdad, more than 200.000 DA of fine as well as the privation of the share due due to the rights of television for the match in question.

20 April 2018 Round 26	CR Belouizdad	1–1	JS Kabylie	Belouizdad
16:00	Bourenane 55' (pen.)	Soccerway report Live TV: TV Tamazight 4	74' Yettou	Stadium: Stade 20 Août 1955; Referee: Mohamed Saïdi

24 April 2018 Round 27	USM Blida	2–2	CR Belouizdad	Blida
16:00	Herbache 8'; Frioui 82'	Soccerway report Live TV: None	4' (pen.) Bellaili; 12' Draoui	Stadium: Brakni Brothers Stadium; Referee: Ali Nader

4 May 2018 Round 28	CR Belouizdad	2–1	Paradou AC	Belouizdad
16:00	Lakroum 12'; Bourenane 79' (pen.)	Soccerway report Live TV: Canal Algérie	81' Yahi	Stadium: Stade 20 Août 1955; Referee: Ramdane Oukil

12 May 2018 Round 29	NA Hussein Dey	0–0	CR Belouizdad	Algiers
16:00		Soccerway report Live TV: Canal Algérie		Stadium: July 5, 1962 Stadium; Referee: Mehdi Abid Charef

19 May 2018 Round 30	CR Belouizdad	1–2	DRB Tadjenanet	Belouizdad
16:00	Lakroum 58'	Soccerway report Live TV: None	3' Hammouche; 39' Belmokhtar	Stadium: Stade 20 Août 1955; Referee: Ahmed Bouzrar

== Algerian Cup ==
30 December 2017 Round of 64	CR Belouizdad	3–0	ARB Ghriss	Belouizdad
15:00	Lakroum 20'; Lamhene 53'; Aribi 63'	Report; Live TV: None		Stadium: August 20, 1955 Stadium; Referee: Ibrir, Tamen, Benhamouda

12 January 2018 Round of 32	CR Belouizdad	2 – 0	CSSW Illizi	Belouizdad
15:00	Draoui 28'; Khoudi 57'	Report; Live TV: Algérie 3		Stadium: Stade 20 Août 1955; Referee: Benhamou A., Arrafa, Benhamou M.

1 February 2018 Round of 16	MC Alger	2–1 (a.e.t.)	CR Belouizdad	Algiers
17:00	Derrardja 40', 98' (pen.)	Report; Live TV: Canal Algérie	20' Sidibe	Stadium: July 5, 1962 Stadium; Referee: Said Aouina

== Algerian Super Cup ==
The 2017 Algerian Super Cup is the 11th edition of the Algerian Super Cup, a competition with only one match, organized by the Professional Football League (LFP) and the Algerian Football Federation (FAF) since 2013. The Algerian Ligue Professionnelle 1 champion competes against the winner of the Algerian Cup.

Therefore, ES Sétif, the 2016-2017 champion of Algeria, played against CR Belouizdad, winner of the 2016–17 Algerian Cup. The rules of the game are: the duration of the game is 90 minutes and in case of a tie, a session of penalties is performed to separate the teams. Three substitutions are allowed for each team.

1 November 2017	ES Sétif	0–0 (4–2 p)	CR Belouizdad	Constantine
17:00		Report; Live TV: Algérie 3 / Canal Algérie / Al-Kass Sports		Stadium: Stade Mohamed Hamlaoui; Attendance: 25,000; Referee: Abderrezzak Arab
	Penalties
	Nadji (penalty scored); Djabou (penalty missed); Djahnit (penalty scored); Haddouche (penalty scored); Aït Ouamar (penalty scored)		(penalty missed) Namani; (penalty scored) Aichi; (penalty scored) Bellaili; (penalty missed) Hamia

== Confederation Cup ==
=== Preliminary round ===
9 February 2018 first leg	Onze Créateurs (Mali)	1–1	(Algeria) CR Belouizdad	Bamako
16:30 UTC+0	Samaké 45' (pen.)	CAF report	62' Bechou	Stadium: Stade Modibo Kéïta; Referee: Mohamed Ali Moussa (Niger)

20 February 2018 Second leg	CR Belouizdad (Algeria)	2–0	(Mali) Onze Créateurs	Belouizdad
17:00 UTC+1	Bouchar 30'; Lakroum 69'	CAF Report		Stadium: Stade du 20-Août-1955; Referee: Adil Zourak (Morocco)

=== First round ===
6 March 2018 first leg	CR Belouizdad (Algeria)	3–0	(Zambia) Nkana	Algiers
17:00 UTC+1	Benkablia 46'; Lamhene 59'; Draoui 71'	Report		Stadium: Stade du 20-Août-1955; Referee: Sadok Selmi (Tunisia)

17 March 2018 Second leg	Nkana (Zambia)	1–0	(Algeria) CR Belouizdad	Kitwe
15:00 UTC+2	Apanene 47' (pen.)	Report		Stadium: Nkana Stadium; Referee: Thulani Sibandze (Swaziland)

=== Play-off round ===
8 April 2018 first leg	ASEC Mimosas (Ivory Coast)	1–0	(Algeria) CR Belouizdad	Abidjan
15:00 UTC+0	Agbégniadan 50'	Report		Stadium: Stade Félix Houphouët-Boigny; Referee: Janny Sikazwe (Zambia)

17 April 2018 Second leg	CR Belouizdad (Algeria)	0–0	(Ivory Coast) ASEC Mimosas	Algiers
17:00 UTC+1		Report		Stadium: Stade du 20-Août-1955; Referee: Sékou Ahmed Touré (Guinea)

== Squad information ==
=== Playing statistics ===
No.	Pos	Nat	Player	Total		Ligue 1		Algerian Cup		Super Cup		Confederation Cup	
No.	Pos	Nat	Player	Apps	Goals	Apps	Goals	Apps	Goals	Apps	Goals	Apps	Goals
Goalkeepers
1	GK	(Algeria) ALG	Sofiane Kacem	1	0	1	0	0	0	0	0	0	0
30	GK	(Algeria) ALG	Abdelkader Salhi	36	0	29	0	0	0	1	0	6	0
16	GK	(Algeria) ALG	Kamel Soufi	1	0	1	0	0	0	0	0	0	0
Defenders
17	DF	(Algeria) ALG	Amir Bellaili	29	3	26	3	0	0	1	0	2	0
15	DF	(Algeria) ALG	Réda Batouche	15	0	12	0	0	0	1	0	2	0
2	DF	(Algeria) ALG	Sofiane Bouchar	33	2	27	1	0	0	1	0	5	1
27	DF	(Algeria) ALG	Abdellah Chebira	8	1	6	1	0	0	0	0	2	0
23	DF	(Algeria) ALG	Hakim Khoudi	16	0	13	0	0	0	1	0	2	0
41	DF	(Algeria) ALG	Ahmed Mammeri	1	0	1	0	0	0	0	0	0	0
4	DF	(Algeria) ALG	Mohamed Namani	32	2	26	2	0	0	1	0	5	0
Midfielders
21	MF	(Algeria) ALG	Faouzi Bourenane	12	2	9	2	0	0	0	0	3	0
14	MF	(Algeria) ALG	Zakaria Draoui	32	5	26	4	0	0	1	0	5	1
6	MF	(Algeria) ALG	Mohamed Heriat	34	0	29	0	0	0	1	0	4	0
28	MF	(Algeria) ALG	Mohamed Adam Izghouti	20	0	14	0	0	0	0	0	6	0
20	MF	(Algeria) ALG	Mokhtar Lamhene	11	1	6	0	0	0	0	0	5	1
7	MF	(Algeria) ALG	Said Sayah	4	0	4	0	0	0	0	0	0	0
8	MF	(Algeria) ALG	Hocine Selmi	26	0	20	0	0	0	0	0	6	0
11	MF	(Mali) MLI	Soumaila Sidibe	13	0	10	0	0	0	0	0	3	0
24	MF	(Algeria) ALG	Bilal Tarikat	20	0	17	0	0	0	0	0	3	0
13	MF	(Algeria) ALG	Hamida Zenasni	34	0	27	0	0	0	1	0	6	0
Forwards
12	FW	(Algeria) ALG	Karim Aribi	24	3	19	3	0	0	0	0	5	0
56	FW	(Algeria) ALG	Youcef Bechou	24	1	19	0	0	0	0	0	5	1
9	FW	(Algeria) ALG	Mohamed Benkablia	6	1	5	0	0	0	0	0	1	1
26	FW	(Algeria) ALG	Yassine Benouadah	5	0	5	0	0	0	0	0	0	0
	FW	(Algeria) ALG	Sid Ali Boukabous	1	0	1	0	0	0	0	0	0	0
10	FW	(Algeria) ALG	Sid Ali Lakroum	36	5	29	4	0	0	1	0	6	1
Players transferred out during the season
	FW	(Algeria) ALG	Mohamed Amine Hamia	12	2	11	2	0	0	1	0	0	0
	MF	(Algeria) ALG	Abdelhak Sameur	9	0	8	0	0	0	1	0	0	0
	FW	(Algeria) ALG	Mounir Aichi	11	1	10	1	0	0	1	0	0	0

Last updated: 1 June 2018
Source: fr.soccerway.com

=== Goalscorers ===
Includes all competitive matches. The list is sorted alphabetically by surname when total goals are equal.

No.	Nat.	Player	Pos.	L 1	AC	SC	CC 3	TOTAL
10	(Algeria)	Sid Ali Lakroum	FW	4	1	0	1	6
14	(Algeria)	Zakaria Draoui	MF	4	1	0	1	6
12	(Algeria)	Karim Aribi	FW	3	1	0	0	4
17	(Algeria)	Amir Bellaili	DF	3	0	0	0	3
2	(Algeria)	Sofiane Bouchar	DF	1	0	0	1	2
4	(Algeria)	Mohamed Namani	DF	2	0	0	0	2
21	(Algeria)	Faouzi Bourenane	MF	2	0	0	0	2
	(Algeria)	Mohamed Amine Hamia	FW	2	0	0	0	2
20	(Algeria)	Mokhtar Lamhene	MF	0	1	0	1	2
27	(Algeria)	Abdellah Chebira	DF	1	0	0	0	1
	(Algeria)	Mounir Aichi	FW	1	0	0	0	1
23	(Algeria)	Hakim Khoudi	DF	0	1	0	0	1
11	(Mali)	Soumaila Sidibe	MF	0	1	0	0	1
56	(Algeria)	Youcef Bechou	FW	0	0	0	1	1
9	(Algeria)	Mohamed Benkablia	FW	0	0	0	1	1
Own Goals				0	0	0	0	0
Totals				24	6	0	6	36

== Squad list ==
As of August 25, 2017. Note: Flags indicate national team as defined under FIFA eligibility rules; some limited exceptions apply. Players may hold more than one non-FIFA nationality.

No.	Pos.	Nation	Player
1	GK	ALG	Sofiane Kacem
2	DF	ALG	Sofiane Bouchar
3	DF	ALG	Hmida Salah
4	DF	ALG	Mohamed Namani
6	MF	ALG	Mohamed Heriat
7	MF	ALG	Said Sayah
8	MF	ALG	Hocine Selmi
9	FW	ALG	Mohamed Amine Hamia
10	FW	ALG	Sid Ali Lakroum
11	FW	ALG	Mounir Aichi
12	FW	ALG	Karim Aribi
13	DF	ALG	Hamida Zenasni
14	MF	ALG	Zakaria Draoui
15	MF	ALG	Réda Batouche

No.	Pos.	Nation	Player
16	GK	ALG	Kamel Soufi
17	DF	ALG	Amir Bellaili
18	MF	ALG	Abdelhak Sameur
19	DF	ALG	Mohamed Amine Aouamri
20	MF	ALG	Mokhtar Lamhene
23	DF	ALG	Hakim Khoudi
24	MF	ALG	Bilal Tarikat
27	DF	ALG	Abdellah Chebira (captain)
28	FW	ALG	Mohamed Adam Izghouti
30	GK	ALG	Abdelkader Salhi
56	FW	ALG	Youcef Bechou
-	DF	ALG	Youcef Bouamrane
-	FW	ALG	Nazim Harchaoui

== Transfers ==
=== In ===
Date	Pos	Player	From club	Transfer fee	Source
13 July 2017	RB	(Algeria) Ahmida Zenasni	USM Bel-Abbès	Free transfer	
13 July 2017	MF	(Algeria) Yahia Labani	USM Bel-Abbès	Free transfer	
13 July 2017	DF	(Algeria) Walid Bouraoui	(Spain) Torrevieja	Free transfer	
13 July 2017	MF	(Algeria) Housseyn Selmi	CA Batna	Free transfer	
13 July 2017	MF	(Algeria) Marwane Benarma	(France) Villefranche CFA	Free transfer	
16 July 2017	DF	(Algeria) Sofiane Bouchar	ES Sétif	Free transfer (Released)	
18 July 2017	GK	(Algeria) Sofiane Kacem	JSM Bejaia	Free transfer	
21 July 2017	MF	(Algeria) Said Sayah	JS Saoura	Free transfer	
28 July 2017	MF	(Algeria) Abdelhak Sameur	CS Constantine	Free transfer	
8 January 2018	AM	(Algeria) Mohamed Benkablia	USM Alger	Undisclosed	
11 January 2018	AM	(Algeria) Faouzi Bourenane	USM Alger	Free transfer (Released)	
15 January 2018	AM/DM	(Mali) Soumaila Sidibe	USM Alger	Loan for six months	

=== Out ===
Date	Pos	Player	To club	Transfer fee	Source
9 July 2017	AM	(Algeria) Bouazza Feham	(Saudi Arabia) Al-Wehda	Free transfer	
20 July 2017	DF	(Algeria) Tarek Cheurfaoui	NA Hussein Dey	Free transfer	
23 July 2017	MF	(Algeria) Karim Nemdil	USM El Harrach	Free transfer	
26 July 2017	FW	(Algeria) Sid Ali Yahia-Chérif	JS Saoura	Free transfer	
