= 2016–17 Olympique de Médéa season =

Olympique de Médéa
2016–17 season
- Chairman: Mahfoud Boukhelkhal
- Head coach: Sid Ahmed Slimani
- Stadium: Stade Imam Lyes de Médéa
- Ligue 1: 12th
- Algerian Cup: Round of 32
- Top goalscorer: League: Mohamed Amine Hamia (6); All: Mohamed Amine Hamia (7)

In the 2016–17 season, Olympique de Médéa is competing in the Ligue 1 for the 1st season, as well as the Algerian Cup.

== Competitions ==
=== Overview ===
Competition	Record								Started round	Final position / round	First match	Last match
Competition	G	W	D	L	GF	GA	GD	Win %	Started round	Final position / round	First match	Last match
Ligue 1	30	10	8	12	32	40	−8	33.33	—N/a	12th	20 August 2016	14 June 2017
Algerian Cup	2	1	0	1	3	2	+1	50.00	Round of 64	Round of 16	26 November 2016	17 December 2016
Total	32	11	8	13	35	42	−7	34.38				

== League table ==
Pos	Team	Pld	W	D	L	GF	GA	GD	Pts	Qualification or relegation
10	DRB Tadjenanet	30	10	9	11	33	32	+1	39 (Note: DRB Tadjenanet ahead of CS Constantine on head-to-head record: CSC–DRB 4–2, DRB–CSC 1–0.)	
11	JS Kabylie	30	8	14	8	20	24	−4	38 (Note: JS Kabylie ahead of Olympique de Médéa on head-to-head record: JSK–OMM 0–1, OMM–JSK 1–2.)	
12	Olympique de Médéa	30	10	8	12	32	40	−8	38	
13	USM El Harrach	30	7	15	8	15	21	−6	36 (Note: RC Relizane ahead of USM El Harrach on head-to-head record: RCR–UEH 0–0, UEH–RCR 0–0 however goal difference in the first leg RCR (−8) UEH (−1).)	
14	RC Relizane (Note: RC Relizane were deducted 3 points.) (R)	30	12	6	12	34	32	+2	36	Relegation to Ligue Professionnelle 2

Updated to match(es) played on 14 June 2017. Source: DZFoot
Rules for classification: 1) points; 2) head-to-head points; 3) head-to-head goal difference; 4) goal difference; 5) total goals; 6) fairplay ranking; 7) playoff.
(R) Relegated

=== Results summary ===
Overall								Home						Away					
Pld	W	D	L	GF	GA	GD	Pts	W	D	L	GF	GA	GD	W	D	L	GF	GA	GD
30	10	8	12	32	40	−8	38	8	4	3	22	16	+6	2	4	9	10	24	−14

Last updated: 30 January 2016.
Source: Competitive matches

=== Results by round ===
Round	1	2	3	4	5	6	7	8	9	10	11	12	13	14	15	16	17	18	19	20	21	22	23	24	25	26	27	28	29	30
Ground																														
Result	W	L	L	D	W	L	W	L	W	D	W	W	W	D	D	L	W	L	D	W	L	L	D	D	W	L	L	L	L	D
Position	4	8	10	11	7	8	7	9	5	6	5	4	4	4	5	5	4	6	4	4	5	8	7	7	6	7	8	9	10	12

Updated to match(es) played on 30 January 2016. Source: Competitive matches
A = Away; H = Home; W = Win; D = Draw; L = Loss

=== Matches ===
Win Draw Loss

20 August 2016 Round 1	Olympique de Médéa	1–0	CA Batna	Médéa
17:30	Hamia 44' (pen.)	Soccerway report Live TV: None		Stadium: Stade Imam Lyes de Médéa; Referee: Mustapha Ghorbal

27 August 2016 Round 2	MC Oran	2–1	Olympique de Médéa	Oran
17:45	Chérif 36'; Ferahi 55'	Report; Live TV: Algérie 3 / Canal Algérie	49' Rachedi	Stadium: Stade Ahmed Zabana; Referee: Rafik Achouri

10 September 2016 Round 3	Olympique de Médéa	1–3	ES Sétif	Médéa
17:00	Addadi 82'	Report; Live TV: Algérie 3	1' (pen.) Nadji; 24' Aït Ouamar; 30' (pen.) Djabou	Stadium: Stade Imam Lyes de Médéa; Referee: Farouk Houasnia

17 September 2016 Round 4	JS Saoura	1–1	Olympique de Médéa	Béchar
19:00	Djallit 69'	Report; Live TV: None	73' Hamia	Stadium: Stade 20 Août 1955; Referee: Mohamed Benouza

22 November 2016 Round 5	Olympique de Médéa	4–0	MO Béjaïa	Médéa
15:00	Lamara 8'; Banouh 19'; Addadi 29'; Boukhenchouche 54'	Report; Live TV: None		Stadium: Stade Imam Lyes de Médéa; Referee: Mustapha Ghorbal

1 October 2016 Round 6	USM Alger	3–2	Olympique de Médéa	Bologhine
17:00	Meziane 5'; Chafaï 9'; Meftah 41' (pen.)	Report; Live TV: Canal Algérie	46' Banouh; 58' Gharbi	Stadium: Stade Omar Hamadi; Referee: Farouk Mial

13 October 2016 Round 7	Olympique de Médéa	2–1	NA Hussein Dey	Médéa
16:00	Addadi 46'; Gharbi 87'	Report; Live TV: Canal Algérie / TV Tamazight 4	73' Khiat	Stadium: Stade Imam Lyes de Médéa; Referee: Mustapha Ghorbal

22 October 2016 Round 8	DRB Tadjenanet	1–0	Olympique de Médéa	Tadjenanet
15:00	Cheniguer 1'	Report; Live TV: None		Stadium: Lahoua Smaïl Stadium; Referee: Mehdi Abid Charef

28 October 2016 Round 9	Olympique de Médéa	3–2	CS Constantine	Médéa
15:30	Banouh 45'; Hamia 52' (pen.), 80'	Report; Live TV: None	25' (pen.) Aoudia; 28' (pen.) Zerara	Stadium: Stade Imam Lyes de Médéa; Referee: Lahlou Benbraham

5 November 2016 Round 10	CR Belouizdad	1–1	Olympique de Médéa	Belouizdad
16:00	Yahia-Chérif 42'	Report; Live TV: None	5' Lamhene	Stadium: Stade 20 Août 1955; Referee: Mohamed Benouza

11 November 2016 Round 11	Olympique de Médéa	2–1	RC Relizane	Médéa
15:30	Hamia 48', 88'	Report; Live TV: None	72' Remache	Stadium: Stade Imam Lyes de Médéa; Referee: Lotfi Bekouassa

19 November 2016 Round 12	Olympique de Médéa	1–0	USM Bel-Abbès	Médéa
15:00	Bouchiba 34'	Report; Live TV: None		Stadium: Stade Imam Lyes de Médéa; Referee: Abderrezzak Arab

3 December 2016 Round 13	JS Kabylie	0–1	Olympique de Médéa	Tizi Ouzou
16:00		Report; Live TV: Canal Algérie	23' Gharbi	Stadium: November 1, 1954 Stadium; Referee: Said Aouina

10 December 2016 Round 14	Olympique de Médéa	1–1	MC Alger	Médéa
15:00	Demmou 10' (o.g.)	Report; Live TV: Algérie 3	38' (pen.) Hachoud	Stadium: Stade Imam Lyes de Médéa; Referee: Lahlou Benbraham

23 December 2016 Round 15	USM El Harrach	0–0	Olympique de Médéa	El Harrach
15:00		Report; Live TV: None		Stadium: November 1, 1954 Stadium; Referee: Mohamed Benabdellah

21 January 2017 Round 16	CA Batna	3–0	Olympique de Médéa	Batna
14:30	Benmansour 30'; Behloul 33'; Mesfar 68'	Report; Live TV: None		Stadium: Mustapha Seffouhi Stadium; Referee: Lotfi Bekouassa

27 January 2017 Round 17	Olympique de Médéa	1–0	MC Oran	Médéa
15:00	Sbia 77'	Report; Live TV: TV Tamazight 4 / Canal Algérie		Stadium: Stade Imam Lyes de Médéa; Referee: Abderrezzak Arab

3 February 2017 Round 18	ES Sétif	1–0	Olympique de Médéa	Sétif
16:00	Djahnit 20'	Report; Live TV: Algérie 3		Stadium: Stade 8 Mai 1945; Referee: Hamza Bouslimani

7 February 2017 Round 19	Olympique de Médéa	1–1	JS Saoura	Médéa
15:00	Rachedi 49'	Report; Live TV: None	15' Saâd	Stadium: Stade Imam Lyes de Médéa; Referee: Mustapha Ghorbal

31 March 2017 Round 20	MO Béjaïa	1–2	Olympique de Médéa	Béjaïa
16:00	Cheklam 67'	Report; Live TV: None	33' Boukhenchouche; 83' Saadou	Stadium: Maghrebi Unity Stadium; Attendance: 0 (close doors); Referee: Rafik Achouri

25 February 2017 Round 21	Olympique de Médéa	1–3	USM Alger	Médéa
15:00	Banouh 44'	Report; Live TV: None	28' (pen.) Meftah; 64' Andria; 72' Chafaï	Stadium: Stade Imam Lyes de Médéa; Referee: Farouk Mial

4 March 2017 Round 22	NA Hussein Dey	2–1	Olympique de Médéa	Mohamed Belouizdad
17:00	Gasmi 33', 87'	Report; Live TV: TV Tamazight 4	76' Gharbi	Stadium: August 20, 1955 Stadium; Referee: Ahmed Bouzrar

10 March 2017 Round 23	Olympique de Médéa	1–1	DRB Tadjenanet	Médéa
16:00	Boukhenchouche 39'	Report; Live TV: None	89' Meftahi	Stadium: Stade Imam Lyes de Médéa; Referee: Lotfi Bekouassa

18 March 2017 Round 24	CS Constantine	1–1	Olympique de Médéa	Constantine
16:00	Aoudia 11'	Report; Live TV: None	69' Saadou	Stadium: Stade Mohamed Hamlaoui; Referee: Said Aouina

6 May 2017 Round 25	Olympique de Médéa	2–1	CR Belouizdad	Médéa
16:00	Addadi 9', 90'	Report; Live TV: None	56' Lamhene	Stadium: Stade Imam Lyes de Médéa; Referee: Lahlou Benbraham

13 May 2017 Round 26	RC Relizane	1–0	Olympique de Médéa	Relizane
16:00	Guebli 69'	Report; Live TV: Algérie 3		Stadium: Stade Tahar Zoughari; Referee: Marzouk Brahimi

20 May 2017 Round 27	USM Bel-Abbès	3–0	Olympique de Médéa	Sidi Bel Abbès
17:30	Bouguelmouna 58'; Chettal 71'; Zouari 90+3'	Report; Live TV: None		Stadium: Stade 24 Fevrier 1956; Referee: Lotfi Bekouassa

7 June 2017 Round 28	Olympique de Médéa	1–2	JS Kabylie	Médéa
17:00	Rachedi 54'	Report; Live TV: None	3' Boulaouidet; 56' (pen.) Guemroud	Stadium: Stade Imam Lyes de Médéa; Referee: Mustapha Ghorbal

10 June 2017 Round 29	MC Alger	4–0	Olympique de Médéa	Bologhine
22:30	Hachoud 18'; Derrardja 48'; Nekkache 58', 63'	Report; Live TV: None		Stadium: Omar Hamadi Stadium; Attendance: 0 (close doors); Referee: Amine Hansal

14 June 2017 Round 30	Olympique de Médéa	0–0	USM El Harrach	Médéa
17:00		Report; Live TV: TV Tamazight 4		Stadium: Stade Imam Lyes de Médéa; Referee: Said Aouina

== Algerian Cup ==
26 November 2016 Round of 64	CRB Aïn Fakroun	0–2	Olympique de Médéa	Aïn Fakroun
14:45		Live TV: None	Zeroual 70'; Rachedi 84'	Stadium: Mohamed Alleg Stadium; Referee: Maascri, Tazoul, Abbane

17 December 2016 Round of 32	USM El Harrach	2–1 (a.e.t.)	Olympique de Médéa	Belouizdad
16:00	Harrag 44' (pen.); Mellel 111'	Live TV: Algérie 3	Hamia 89' (pen.)	Stadium: Stade du 20 Août 1955; Referee: Abid Charef, Boulfelfel, Benamira

== Squad information ==
=== Playing statistics ===
No.	Pos	Nat	Player	Total		Ligue 1		Algerian Cup	
No.	Pos	Nat	Player	Apps	Goals	Apps	Goals	Apps	Goals
Goalkeepers
60	GK	(Algeria) ALG	Youcef Chiker	4	0	4	0	0	0
16	GK	(Algeria) ALG	Tahir Lamraoui	17	0	15	0	2	0
1	GK	(Algeria) ALG	Mohamed Ousserir	9	0	9	0	0	0
40	GK	(Algeria) ALG	Zakaria Saidi	3	0	3	0	0	0
Defenders
26	DF	(Algeria) ALG	Mohamed Benaissa	9	0	9	0	0	0
3	DF	(Algeria) ALG	Sofiane Ben Braham	4	0	4	0	0	0
4	DF	(Algeria) ALG	Imadeddine Boubekeur	32	0	30	0	2	0
31	DF	(Algeria) ALG	Chouaib Boucherit	1	0	1	0	0	0
24	DF	(Algeria) ALG	Adel Bouchiba	27	0	27	0	0	0
30	DF	(Algeria) ALG	Nassim Bourekba	3	0	3	0	0	0
20	DF	(Algeria) ALG	Sabri Gharbi	25	4	24	4	1	0
15	DF	(Algeria) ALG	Nabil Lamara	23	1	21	1	2	0
12	DF	(Algeria) ALG	Nabil Saâdou	31	2	29	2	2	0
27	DF	(Algeria) ALG	Meziane Zéroual	22	1	20	0	2	1
19	DF	(Algeria) ALG	Iles Ziane Cherif	3	0	3	0	0	0
13	DF	(Algeria) ALG	Yacine Roudine	1	0	0	0	1	0
	DF	(Algeria) ALG	Benyamina	1	0	0	0	1	0
Midfielders
18	MF	(Algeria) ALG	Toufik Addadi	29	0	27	0	2	0
	MF	(Algeria) ALG	Mohamed Ousalem Benhocine	1	0	1	0	0	0
48	MF	(Algeria) ALG	Islam Boubekeur	3	0	3	0	0	0
8	MF	(Algeria) ALG	Said Bouchouk	5	0	5	0	0	0
17	MF	(Algeria) ALG	Salim Boukhenchouche	28	4	26	4	2	0
22	MF	(Algeria) ALG	Abderrazek Ghellab	12	0	11	0	1	0
99	MF	(Algeria) ALG	Daïaeddine Goudjil	1	0	1	0	0	0
48	MF	(Algeria) ALG	Anouar Hafiane	2	0	2	0	0	0
21	MF	(Algeria) ALG	Youcef Islam Herida	11	0	11	0	0	0
7	MF	(Algeria) ALG	Takfarinas Ouchène	26	0	25	0	1	0
23	MF	(Algeria) ALG	Nazim Si Salem	3	0	3	0	0	0
	MF	(Algeria) ALG	Mohamed Zenagui	2	0	2	0	0	0
Forwards
9	FW	(Algeria) ALG	Hamza Banouh	25	4	23	4	2	0
	FW	(Algeria) ALG	Houssem Harriche	2	0	2	0	0	0
97	FW	(Algeria) ALG	Reda Mansouri	1	0	1	0	0	0
10	FW	(Algeria) ALG	Abdelali Ouadah	5	0	5	0	0	0
11	FW	(Algeria) ALG	Karim Rachedi	25	4	23	3	2	1
19	FW	(Algeria) ALG	Walid Sbia	7	1	7	1	0	0
Players transferred out during the season
23	FW	(Algeria) ALG	Mohamed Amine Hamia	15	7	14	6	1	1
6	MF	(Algeria) ALG	Mohamed Heriat	2	0	0	0	2	0
10	MF	(Algeria) ALG	Mokhtar Amir Lemhene	13	1	11	1	2	0

Source: Competitions

== Squad list ==
As of January 15, 2017 Note: Flags indicate national team as defined under FIFA eligibility rules; some limited exceptions apply. Players may hold more than one non-FIFA nationality.

No.	Pos.	Nation	Player
1	GK	ALG	Mohamed Ousserir
3	DF	ALG	Sofiane Ben Braham
4	DF	ALG	Imadeddine Boubekeur
5	DF	ALG	Nabil Saâdou
6	MF	ALG	Mohamed Heriat
7	DF	ALG	Takfarinas Ouchène
8	MF	ALG	Said Bouchouk
9	FW	ALG	Hamza Banouh
10	FW	ALG	Abdelali Ouadah
11	FW	ALG	Karim Rachedi
13	DF	ALG	Yacine Roudine
15	DF	ALG	Nabil Lamara

No.	Pos.	Nation	Player
16	GK	ALG	Tahir Lamraoui
17	MF	ALG	Salim Boukhenchouche
18	MF	ALG	Toufik Addadi
19	DF	ALG	Walid Sbia
20	DF	ALG	Sabri Gharbi
21	DF	ALG	Youcef Islam Herida
22	MF	ALG	Abderrazek Ghellab
23	MF	ALG	Nazim Si Salem
24	MF	ALG	Adel Bouchiba
26	DF	ALG	Mohamed Benaissa
27	MF	ALG	Meziane Zéroual
30	GK	ALG	Nassim Bourekba
