= Mounir Madoui =

Algerian footballer (born 1979)

Personal information
- Full name: Mounir Madoui
- Date of birth: August 18, 1979 (age 47)
- Place of birth: Sétif, Algeria
- Height: 1.78 m (5 ft 10 in)
- Position: Defender

Senior career*
Years	Team	Apps	(Gls)
1999–2005	ES Sétif	-	(-)
2005–2006	CS Constantine	-	(-)
- * Club domestic league appearances and goals

Mounir Madoui (born August 18, 1979) is an Algerian footballer who played for ES Sétif and CS Constantine. Madoui is the younger brother of Kheïreddine Madoui, who also played for ES Sétif.
