= Mokhtar Lamhene =

Algerian footballer (born 1990)

Personal information
- Full name: Mokhtar Amir Lamhene
- Date of birth: January 18, 1990 (age 36)
- Place of birth: Tizi Ouzou, Algeria
- Position: Midfielder

Team information
- Current team: JSM Skikda
- Number: 11

Youth career
- –2010: JS Kabylie

Senior career*
Years	Team	Apps	(Gls)
2010–2014	JS Kabylie	32	(4)
2013	→ USM Annaba (loan)	3	(0)
2014	WRB M'Sila		
2014–2015	US Chaouia		
2015–2017	Olympique de Médéa		
2017–2018	CR Belouizdad		
2018	AS Aïn M'lila		
2019–	JSM Skikda		

International career^{‡}
2006	Algeria U17	-	(-)
2007–2008	Algeria U20	1	(0)
- * Club domestic league appearances and goals as of 00:00, 15 January 2019 (UTC) ‡ National team caps and goals as of 00:00, 5 August 2011 (UTC)

Mokhtar Amir Lamhene (born January 18, 1990) is an Algerian football player. He currently plays for JSM Skikda in the Algerian Ligue Professionnelle 2.
