= Franck Obambou =

Gabonese footballer

Personal information
- Full name: Franck Perrin Obambou
- Date of birth: 24 June 1995 (age 31)
- Place of birth: Libreville, Gabon
- Height: 1.86 m (6 ft 1 in)
- Position: Centre back

Senior career*
| Years | Team | Apps | (Gls) |
| 2013–2014 | Tucanes de Amazonas | 22 | (0) |
| 2015–2016 | Akanda | | |
| 2016–2017 | Stade Mandji | | |
| 2017–2018 | ES Sétif | 16 | (1) |
| 2018–2019 | Al-Ittihad | | |
| 2020 | Al-Yarmouk | | |

International career^{‡}
| 2015–2018 | Gabon | 10 | (1) |
- * Club domestic league appearances and goals as of 23 November 2017 ‡ National team caps and goals as of 2 August 2023

Franck Obambou (born 26 June 1995) is a Gabonese professional footballer.

== Career ==
In 2020, Obambou joined Al-Yarmouk in Kuwait. His contract was terminated in May 2020.

== International career ==
=== International goals ===
Scores and results list Gabon's goal tally first.

| No | Date | Venue | Opponent | Score | Result | Competition |
|---|---|---|---|---|---|---|
| 1. | 24 January 2016 | Stade Huye, Butare, Rwanda | Ivory Coast | 1–1 | 1–4 | 2016 African Nations Championship |
