= Kheïreddine Madoui =

Algerian footballer and manager (born 1977)

Personal information
- Date of birth: March 27, 1977 (age 49)
- Place of birth: Sétif, Algeria
- Position: Midfielder

Senior career*
Years	Team	Apps	(Gls)
1997–2000	ES Sétif	80	(10)
2000–2002	CR Belouizdad	40	(5)
2002–2005	ES Sétif	45	(3)

International career
1997–1998	Algeria U23	3	(0)
2000–2001	Algeria	12	(3)

Managerial career
- 2011: WR M'Sila
- 2013–2015: ES Sétif
- 2015–2016: Al-Wehda
- 2016–2017: ES Sétif
- 2017–2018: Étoile du Sahel
- 2018: Ismaily SC
- 2018–2019: MO Béjaïa
- 2019: ES Sétif
- 2020: Al-Khaleej
- 2020: Al-Shoulla
- 2021: MC Oran
- 2021–2022: Qadsia
- 2022–2023: CS Constantine
- 2023-24: MC Oran
- 2024-: CS Constantine
- * Club domestic league appearances and goals

Kheïreddine Madoui (Arabic: خير الدين مضوي; born March 27, 1977) is an Algerian football former player and a current manager.

== Career ==
Madoui was born in Sétif. As a player, he spent his entire career between his hometown club ES Sétif and CR Belouizdad. He also had 12 caps and 3 goals for the Algeria national team.

In 2005, he had to end up his active career due to a severe leg injury with only 28 years of age.

Five years later, in summer 2010 he became assistant coach of his hometown club ES Sétif, until he was designated as head coach of the team in December 2013.

In 2014, Madoui became the youngest ever coach to lead his team to the final of an African continental competition after guiding ES Sétif to the 2014 CAF Champions League final.

On 3 May 2015, Madoui announced he is stepping down as coach of ES Setif at the end of the current season.

On 24 May 2018, Egyptian club Ismaily SC announced Madoui as the new manager, only a day after former manager Pedro Barny was announced to have left the club.

On 11 January 2020, Saudi Arabian club Al-Khaleej announced Madoui as the new manager. On 6 October 2020, Saudi Arabian club Al-Shoulla announced Madoui as the new manager.

On 13 February 2021, MC Oran announced Madoui as new manager.

== Honours ==
=== Manager ===
ES Sétif

- CAF Champions League: 2014
- Algerian Ligue Professionnelle 1: 2014–15, 2016–17
- CAF Super Cup: 2015
- Algerian Super Cup: 2015, 2017
