= Aymen Attou =

Algerian footballer (born 1997)

Personal information
- Full name: Aymen Attou
- Date of birth: October 8, 1997 (age 29)
- Place of birth: Algeria
- Position: Right-back

Team information
- Current team: WA Tlemcen
- Number: 22

Youth career
- –2016: ES Sétif

Senior career*
Years	Team	Apps	(Gls)
2016–2018	ES Sétif	3	(0)
2018–2021	WA Tlemcen	44	(0)
2021–2022	MC Alger	19	(0)
2022–2023	USM Khenchela	16	(0)
2023–2025	NC Magra	26	(0)
2025–	WA Tlemcen	7	(0)

International career^{‡}
2017–	Algeria U23	2	(0)
- * Club domestic league appearances and goals as of 14 June 2024 ‡ National team caps and goals as of 15 June 15 2017

Aymen Attou (Arabic: أيمن عطو; born October 8, 1997) is an Algerian footballer who plays for WA Tlemcen.

== Club career ==
On June 14, 2017, Attou made his senior debut as a starter in a league match against DRB Tadjenanet.

In 2018, Attou signed a contract with WA Tlemcen.

In 2021, Attou signed a contract with MC Alger.
