= Anes Saad =

Algerian footballer (born 1996)

Personal information
- Full name: Anes Saad
- Date of birth: January 19, 1996 (age 30)
- Place of birth: Sidi Bel Abbès, Algeria
- Height: 1.82 m (6 ft 0 in)
- Position: Centre back

Team information
- Current team: ICS Tlemcen

Youth career
- –2017: ES Sétif

Senior career*
Years	Team	Apps	(Gls)
2017–2019	ES Sétif	31	(0)
2019–2020	USM Bel Abbès	4	(0)
2020–2021	CR Belouizdad	0	(0)
2022–2023	CRB Ben Badis		
2023	USM Khenchela	3	(0)
2025–	ICS Tlemcen		
- * Club domestic league appearances and goals as of 15 July 2023

Anes Saad (Arabic: أنس سعد; born January 19, 1996) is an Algerian footballer who plays for ICS Tlemcen.

== Career ==
In 2019, he joined USM Bel Abbès. In 2020 he signed a four-year contract with CR Belouizdad.He was released after seven months due to lack of seriousness.In 2023, he joined USM Khenchela.In 2025, he joined ICS Tlemcen.
