= Miloud Rebiaï =

Algerian footballer (born 1993)

Personal information
- Date of birth: 12 December 1993 (age 32)
- Place of birth: Tlemcen, Algeria
- Height: 1.82 m (6 ft 0 in)
- Positions: Defensive midfielder; defender

Team information
- Current team: CS Constantine
- Number: 25

Senior career*
Years	Team	Apps	(Gls)
2011–2015	WA Tlemcen		
2015–2019	ES Sétif	78	(6)
2019–2022	MC Alger	61	(2)
2022–2023	CR Belouizdad	14	(0)
2023-	CS Constantine	57	(8)

International career^{‡}
2012	Algeria U20	5	(0)
2015–	Algeria U23	4	(0)
- * Club domestic league appearances and goals as of 5 June 2026 ‡ National team caps and goals as of 24 July 2016

Miloud Rebiaï (Arabic: ميلود ربيعي; born 12 December 1993) is an Algerian professional footballer who plays for CS Constantine.

== Career ==
On 24 March 2012, Rebiaï made his professional debut for WA Tlemcen, coming on a substitute in a league match against MC Saïda.

In 2019, he signed a contract with MC Alger.

In 2022, he joined CR Belouizdad. In 2023, he joined CS Constantine.
