= Khairi Barki =

Algerian footballer

Personal information
- Full name: Khairi Barki
- Date of birth: 12 December 1990 (age 35)
- Place of birth: Ouenza, Algeria
- Height: 1.82 m (6 ft 0 in)
- Position: Goalkeeper

Youth career
- –2009: USM Annaba

Senior career*
Years	Team	Apps	(Gls)
2009–2013	USM Annaba	2	(0)
2013–2014	CRB Aïn Fakroun	23	(0)
2014–2015	JS Saoura	1	(0)
2015–2016	DRB Tadjenanet	13	(0)
2016–2018	ES Sétif	23	(0)
2016–2018	WA Tlemcen	14	(0)
2019–2020	CR Belouizdad	7	(0)
2020–2021	ES Sétif	4	(0)
2021–2022	AS Aïn M'lila		(0)
2022–2023	US Souf		(0)
- * Club domestic league appearances and goals as of 27 August 2023

Khairi Barki (Arabic: خيري باركي; born 10 October 1995) is an Algerian footballer.

== Career ==
In 2019, Khairi Barki signed a contract with CR Belouizdad.

In 2020, He signed a two-year contract with ES Sétif.

In 2021, He joined AS Aïn M'lila.
