= Mohamed Khoutir Ziti =

Algerian footballer (born 1990)

Personal information
- Date of birth: April 19, 1990 (age 36)
- Place of birth: Sétif, Algeria
- Height: 1.83 m (6 ft 0 in)
- Position: Right-back

Youth career
- 2005–2009: ES Sétif

Senior career*
Years	Team	Apps	(Gls)
2009–2011	JS Kabylie	23	(1)
2011–2012	CS Constantine	20	(2)
2012–2014	ES Sétif	52	(4)
2014–2016	JS Kabylie	52	(2)
2016–2018	ES Sétif	46	(3)
2018–2019	CA Bordj Bou Arréridj	22	(0)
2019–2020	CR Belouizdad	9	(0)
2020–2021	Al-Nasr SC		
2021–2024	ES Sétif	44	(1)

International career^{‡}
2010–2011	Algeria U23	17	(2)
2015–	Algeria	3	(0)
- * Club domestic league appearances and goals as of 14 June 2024 ‡ National team caps and goals as of 8 June 2017

Mohamed Khoutir Ziti (Arabic: محمد خثير زيتي; born April 19, 1990) is an Algerian professional football player who plays as a right-back.

== Club career ==
Ziti was born in Sétif. In July 2009, he joined JS Kabylie on a free transfer from, signing a two-year contract with the club. In the 2009–10 season, the first with the club, he made 11 appearances, scoring one goal.

In August 2010, Ziti scored JS Kabylie's only goal in a 1–0 win over Egyptian club Al-Ahly in the group stage of the 2010 CAF Champions League.

== International career ==
In May 2010, Ziti was called up to the Algerian Under-23 National Team for a training camp in Italy. In November 2011, he was selected as part of Algeria's squad for the 2011 CAF U-23 Championship in Morocco.
