= Mohamed Islam Bakir =

Algerian footballer (born 1996)

Personal information
- Full name: Mohamed Islam Bakir
- Date of birth: July 13, 1996 (age 30)
- Place of birth: Larbaâ, Algeria
- Position: Winger

Team information
- Current team: CS Constantine
- Number: 11

Youth career
- RC Arbaâ

Senior career*
Years	Team	Apps	(Gls)
2015–2016	RC Arbaâ	23	(3)
2016–2019	ES Sétif	73	(5)
2019–2020	CS Sfaxien	20	(1)
2020–2024	CR Belouizdad	76	(4)
2024-2026	USM Khenchela	51	(8)
2026-	CS Constantine	0	(0)

International career^{‡}
2016–	Algeria U23	1	(0)
- * Club domestic league appearances and goals as of 7 July 2026 ‡ National team caps and goals as of 12 February 2017

Mohamed Islam Bakir (Arabic: محمد إسلام بكير; born July 13, 1996) is an Algerian footballer who plays for CS Constantine in the Algerian Ligue Professionnelle 1.

== Club career ==
In June 2016, Bakir signed a three-year contract with ES Sétif.

On 7 July 2026, he joined CS Constantine.
