= Hamza Banouh =

Association football player (b. 1990)

Personal information
- Full name: Hamza Banouh
- Date of birth: May 7, 1990 (age 36)
- Place of birth: Algiers, Algeria
- Height: 1.83 m (6 ft 0 in)
- Position: Forward

Team information
- Current team: MSP Batna
- Number: 13

Youth career
- RC Kouba

Senior career*
Years	Team	Apps	(Gls)
2011–2014	RC Kouba		
2014–2015	MO Béjaïa	12	(1)
2015–2017	O Médéa	51	(9)
2017–2018	USM El Harrach	14	(5)
2018–2019	ES Sétif	26	(4)
2019–2020	JS Kabylie	13	(4)
2020	CA Bordj Bou Arréridj	0	(12)
2021–2022	NA Hussein Dey	41	(7)
2022–2023	NC Magra	19	(3)
2023–2024	Al-Watani		
2024–2025	Al-Qotah		
2025–2026	US Chaouia		
2026–	MSP Batna		
- * Club domestic league appearances and goals as of 16 August 2026

Hamza Banouh (Arabic: حمزة بانوح; born May 7, 1990) is an Algerian footballer plays as a forward for MSP Batna.

== Career ==
In 2014, he signed for MO Béjaïa. In 2017, he joined USM El Harrach. In 2018, he signed for ES Sétif. In 2019, he joined JS Kabylie. In 2020, he signed for CA Bordj Bou Arréridj. On 16 August 2026, he joined MSP Batna.
