= Abdelhakim Amokrane =

Algerian footballer (born 1994)

Personal information
- Full name: Abdelhakim Amokrane
- Date of birth: May 10, 1994 (age 32)
- Place of birth: Aïn Beïda, Algeria
- Position: Forward

Team information
- Current team: MB Rouissat
- Number: 24

Youth career
- –2014: ES Sétif

Senior career*
Years	Team	Apps	(Gls)
2011–2018	ES Sétif	51	(10)
2015	→ ESM Koléa (loan)	-	(-)
2015	→ DRB Tadjenanet (loan)	8	(0)
2018–2019	MO Béjaïa	23	(6)
2019–2021	CS Constantine	47	(11)
2021–2023	US Monastir	30	(3)
2023–2024	Al-Ansar		
2024–2025	Bisha		
2025–2026	MC El Bayadh	19	(1)
2026–	MB Rouissat	0	(0)

International career^{‡}
2015–2016	Algeria U23	9	(2)
- * Club domestic league appearances and goals as of 5 August 2026 ‡ National team caps and goals as of 14:00, November 18, 2017 (EST)

Abdelhakim Amokrane (born May 10, 1994) is an Algerian footballer who plays for MB Rouissat.

== Career ==
On 11 July 2024, Amokrane joined Saudi Second Division side Bisha. On 5 August 2026, he joined MB Rouissat.

== International career ==
In July 2015, Amokrane scored a brace for the Algeria under-23 national team in a 2–0 win over Sierra Leone in the first leg of their third round match-up in the 2015 CAF U-23 Championship qualifiers.

== Honours ==
ES Sétif

- CAF Champions League: 2014
