= Amine Hamia =

Algerian professional football player (born 1989)

Personal information
- Full name: Mohamed Amine Hamia
- Date of birth: October 5, 1989 (age 37)
- Place of birth: Bourouba, Algeria
- Position: Forward

Team information
- Current team: US Souf
- Number: 8

Senior career*
Years	Team	Apps	(Gls)
2012–2013	ES Ben Aknoun		
2014–2015	CRB Dar El Beïda		
2015–2016	JSM Skikda	12	(3)
2016–2017	Olympique de Médéa	26	(16)
2017–2018	CR Belouizdad	23	(9)
2018–2019	USM Alger	13	(3)
2019	MC Oran	6	(0)
2020	CS Chebba	8	(1)
2020–2021	AS Aïn M'lila	21	(8)
2021	Al-Diwaniya FC		
2021–2022	CS Chebba		
2023–2024	Al-Sharq		
2024–	US Souf	4	(0)
- * Club domestic league appearances and goals as of 14 June 2024

Mohamed Amine Hamia (born October 6, 1989) is an Algerian professional footballer who plays as a forward for US Souf.

== Career ==
On January 15, Hamia joined to USM Alger for three seasons, coming from the neighbor CR Belouizdad. He made his debut for the team in the Ligue 1 during a win against DRB Tadjenanet. and later played only four games until the end of the season, At the beginning of the new season he was expected to leave the team but leaving a large number of players, most notably striker Oussama Darfalou, considered by the administration to be his replacement and in his first game of the season. Against Rayon Sports he participated as a substitute and scored the equalizer, his first since joining. After the match Hamia was injured and with sparkling colleague Prince Ibara, he is no longer involved only when he is injured or absent On 30 October 2018, in his debut as a starter in the Ligue 1 against his former team Olympique de Médéa and scored a brace for The Reds and Blacks. then he participated in several games as a basic until the game of Al-Merrikh, where he was the worst player in the games and was criticized by the supporters Which demanded his release after the game and on his Facebook page Hamia apologized for his performance, saying he was not in his day.

== Career statistics ==
As of 26 May 2019

Appearances and goals by club, season and competition
Club	Season	League			Cup		Continental		Other		Total	
Club	Season	Division	Apps	Goals	Apps	Goals	Apps	Goals	Apps	Goals	Apps	Goals
JSM Skikda	2015–16	Ligue Professionnelle 2	12	3	0	0	—		—		12	3
JSM Skikda	Total		12	3	0	0	—		—		12	3
Olympique de Médéa	2015–16	Ligue Professionnelle 2	12	10	0	0	—		—		12	10
Olympique de Médéa	2016–17	Ligue Professionnelle 1	14	6	1	1	—		—		15	7
Olympique de Médéa	Total		26	16	1	1	—		—		27	17
CR Belouizdad	2016–17	Ligue Professionnelle 1	12	7	2	1	—		—		14	8
CR Belouizdad	2017–18	Ligue Professionnelle 1	11	2	0	0	—		—		11	2
CR Belouizdad	Total		23	9	2	1	—		—		25	10
USM Alger	2017–18	Ligue Professionnelle 1	3	0	1	0	1 (Note: Appearance(s) in CAF Confederation Cup)	0	—		5	0
USM Alger	2018–19	Ligue Professionnelle 1	10	3	3	1	1	1	3 (Note: Appearance(s) in Arab Club Champions Cup)	1	17	6
USM Alger	Total		13	3	4	1	2	1	3	1	22	6
Career total			74	31	7	3	2	1	3	1	86	36

== Honours ==
CR Belouizdad

- Algerian Cup: 2017

Olympique de Médéa

- Algerian Ligue Professionnelle 2: 2015–16

USM Alger

- Algerian Ligue Professionnelle 1: 2018–19

Individual

- Algerian Ligue Professionnelle 2 top scorer: 2015–16
