= Abdelmoumene Djabou =

Algerian footballer (born 1987)

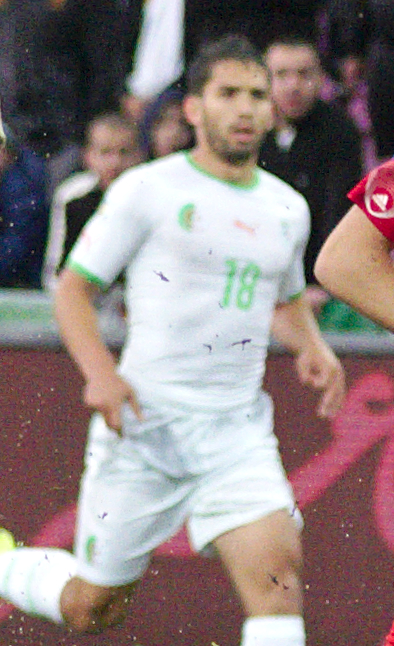
- Djabou with Algeria in 2014

Personal information
- Full name: Abdelmoumene Djabou
- Date of birth: 31 January 1987 (age 39)
- Place of birth: Sétif, Algeria
- Height: 1.65 m (5 ft 5 in)
- Position: Attacking midfielder

Youth career
- USM Sétif
- ES Sétif

Senior career*
Years	Team	Apps	(Gls)
2005–2012	ES Sétif	101	(22)
2006–2007	→ MC El Eulma (loan)	23	(6)
2009–2010	→ USM El Harrach (loan)	43	(7)
2012–2015	Club Africain	68	(19)
2016–2019	ES Sétif	49	(3)
2018	→ Al-Nassr (loan)	7	(1)
2019–2021	MC Alger	18	(0)
2021–2023	ES Sétif	42	(5)

International career^{‡}
2005–2006	Algeria U20	1	(0)
2010–2018	Algeria A'	12	(3)
2010–2017	Algeria	13	(3)
- * Club domestic league appearances and goals as of 19 August 2019 ‡ National team caps and goals as of 00:00, 31 January 2018 (EST)

Abdelmoumene Djabou (born 31 January 1987) is an Algerian former professional footballer who plays as an attacking midfielder.

An Algerian international since 2010, Djabou was a member of the Algerian teams at the 2014 FIFA World Cup in Brazil and the 2015 Africa Cup of Nations in Equatorial Guinea. As of January 2018, he has won 13 international caps and scored three goals.

Djabou is Algeria's all-time top scorer at the FIFA World Cup with two goals, a record he shares with Salah Assad and Islam Slimani.

== Club career ==
Djabou came through the junior ranks of his hometown club ES Sétif with the exception of one season with USM Sétif. He made his senior debut during the 2004–05 season, making two league appearances. The following season, he made another two appearances. He spent the 2006–07 season on loan to MC El Eulma.

On 30 September 2008, Djabou was loaned out to Swiss club FC Sion. However, after a month with the club, his paperwork had still not cleared and Djabou returned to ES Sétif.

In January 2009, Djabou was loaned out to USM El Harrach. Djabou made his début for USM El Harrach on 19 February 2009, against NA Hussein Dey coming on as a substitute in the 60th minute for Gharbi. He scored his first goal for the club against his former club MC El Eulma in the 17th minute, with the result being 2–2. He scored his second goal against RC Kouba in the first minute, with the final result ending at 5–1. He appeared in 12 games and scored two goals during his first loan spell at USM El Harrach. He also spent the 2009–10 season on loan with the club, scoring five goals in 31 appearances. On 9 June 2010, he returned to ES Sétif.

On 13 June 2012, Djabou signed a two-year contract with Tunisian side Club Africain.

On 15 June 2019, he joined MC Alger.

== International career ==
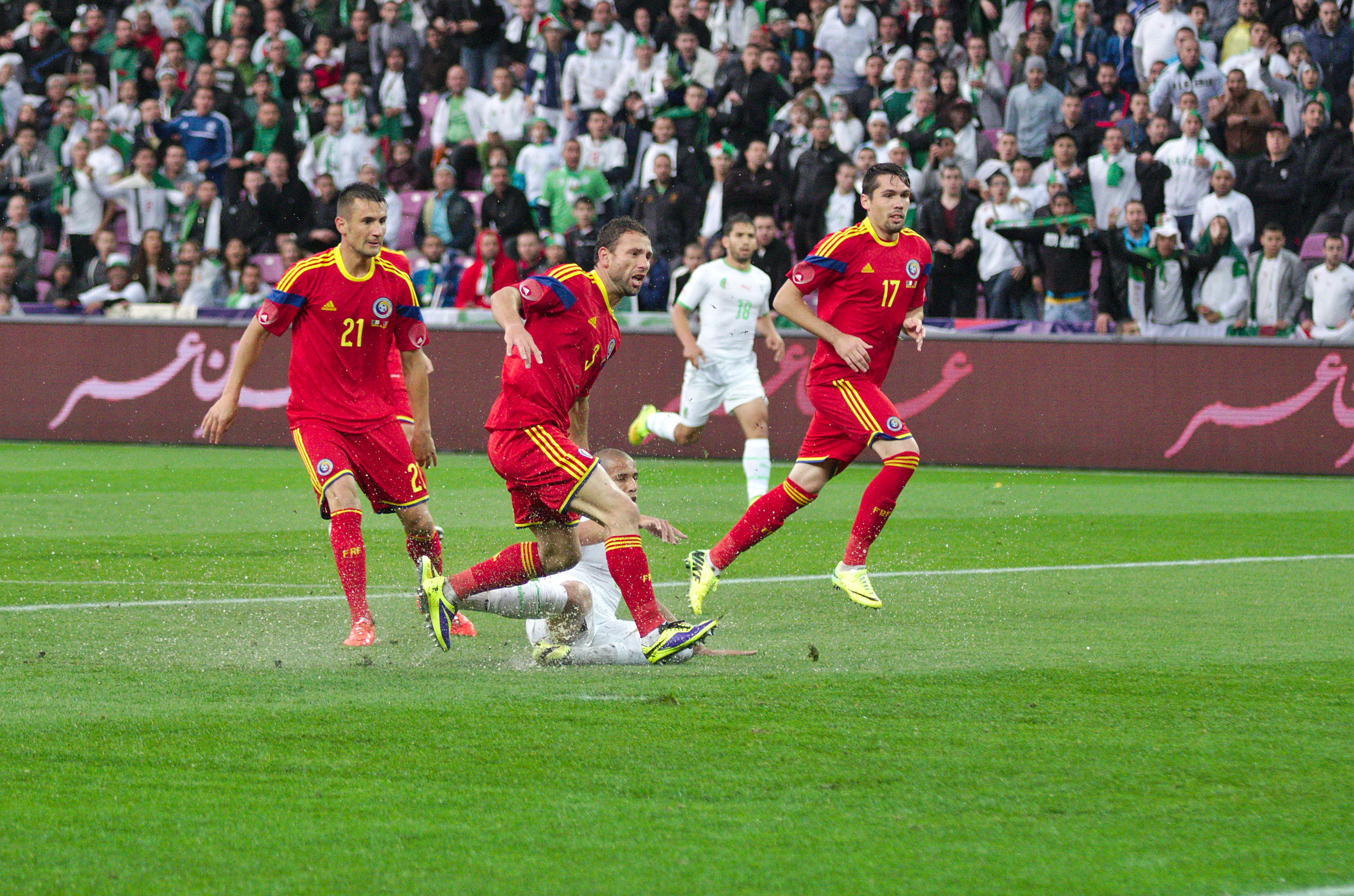
Abdelmoumene Djabou (in white) in a friendly match with Romania

On 18 September 2010, Djabou was called up to the Algeria national team by new coach Abdelhak Benchikha for a qualifier against the Central African Republic.

Djabou competed for Algeria at the 2011 African Nations Championship in Sudan, helping the Desert Foxes reach the semi-finals.

He appeared twice during the 2014 FIFA World Cup qualification campaign, and was selected for Algeria's squad for the 2014 FIFA World Cup finals on 2 June 2014. On 22 June, Djabou scored the third goal for Les Fennecs in a 4–2 World Cup group match win against South Korea. He also scored the team's consolation goal in the 121st minute of a 2–1 extra time defeat by Germany in the round of 16.

== International goals ==
Scores and results list Algeria's goal tally first, score column indicates score after each Djabou goal.

List of international goals scored by Abdelmoumene Djabou
No.	Date	Venue	Opponent	Score	Result	Competition
1	14 August 2013	Stade Mustapha Tchaker, Blida, Algeria	Guinea	2–0	2–2	Friendly
2	22 June 2014	Estádio Beira-Rio, Porto Alegre, Brazil	South Korea	3–0	4–2	2014 FIFA World Cup
3	30 June 2014	Estádio Beira-Rio, Porto Alegre, Brazil	Germany	1–2	1–2	2014 FIFA World Cup

== Honours ==
ES Sétif

- Algerian Ligue Professionnelle 1: 2008–09, 2011–12, 2016–17
- Algerian Cup: 2011–12
- Arab Champions League: 2007–08
- North African Cup Winners Cup: 2010
- North African Super Cup: 2010

Club Africain

- Tunisian Ligue Professionnelle 1: 2014–15
