= Mohamed Naâmani =

Algerian footballer (born 1990)

Personal information
- Full name: Mohamed Naâmani
- Date of birth: 21 May 1990 (age 36)
- Place of birth: Algiers, Algeria
- Height: 1.98 m (6 ft 6 in)
- Position: Defender

Team information
- Current team: NA Hussein Dey
- Number: 4

Senior career*
Years	Team	Apps	(Gls)
2010–2014	USM Blida	88	(5)
2014–2016	ASO Chlef	53	(6)
2016–2018	CR Belouizdad	56	(4)
2018–2019	Al-Fateh	17	(0)
2020–2024	MC Oran	78	(7)
2020–	NA Hussein Dey	0	(0)

International career^{‡}
2018	Algeria	1	(0)
- * Club domestic league appearances and goals as of 14 November 2025 ‡ National team caps and goals as of 12 October 2018

Mohamed Naâmani (Arabic: محمد نعماني; born 21 May 1990) is an Algerian professional footballer who currently plays as a defender with NA Hussein Dey.

== Professional career ==
Naâmani began his career with various Algerian clubs before moving to Al-Fateh SC on 25 June 2018. Naâmani made his professional debut with Al-Fateh in a 0-0 Saudi Professional League tie with Al-Qadsiah FC on 31 August 2018.

== International career ==
Naâmani made his senior debut with the Algeria national football team in a friendly 2–0 loss to Saudi Arabia on 9 May 2018.
