= Zakaria Haddouche =

Algerian footballer (born 1993)

Personal information
- Full name: Zakaria Haddouche
- Date of birth: 19 August 1993 (age 33)
- Place of birth: Maghnia, Algeria
- Height: 1.70 m (5 ft 7 in)
- Position: Winger

Youth career
- ASO Chlef

Senior career*
Years	Team	Apps	(Gls)
2011–2015	ASO Chlef	60	(5)
2015–2018	ES Sétif	66	(11)
2018–2019	MC Alger	20	(1)
2019–2020	USM Alger	6	(0)
2020	Al-Khaleej		
2021	CS Constantine	13	(1)
2022-2024	ASO Chlef	19	(0)

International career^{‡}
2009–2010	Algeria U17	3	(1)
2011–2013	Algeria U20	8	(1)
2014–	Algeria U23	5	(1)
- * Club domestic league appearances and goals as of 14 June 2024 ‡ National team caps and goals as of 00:00, 12 July 2015 (EST)

Zakaria Haddouche (Arabic: زكرياء حدوش; born 19 August 1993) is an Algerian football player.

== Club career ==
On 12 December 2011 Haddouche made his professional debut for ASO Chlef in round 14 of the 2011–12 Algerian Ligue Professionnelle 1 against USM Alger. He came on as a 45th-minute substitute for Kheireddine Selama. On 2 March 2012 Haddouche scored his first goal for ASO Chlef in the qualifying round of the 2012 CAF Champions League against ASFA Yennenga of Burkina Faso. Coming as a 57th-minute substitute, he scored a goal in the 74th minute as ASO Chlef won the game 4–1 to qualifying to the next round. On 10 March he scored again, this time in the Round of 16 of the 2011–12 Algerian Cup against CRB Aïn Djasser.

In 2019, Haddouche signed a two-year contract with USM Alger. In 2021, he signed a contract with CS Constantine.

== Honours ==
ASO Chlef

- Algerian Cup: 2022–23
