= Hamza Aït Ouamar =

Algerian footballer (born 1986)

Personal information
- Date of birth: 6 December 1986 (age 39)
- Place of birth: Algiers, Algeria
- Height: 1.80 m (5 ft 11 in)
- Position: Midfielder

Youth career
- 1995–2003: USM Alger
- 2003–2005: FC Rouen
- 2005: Terrassa FC

Senior career*
Years	Team	Apps	(Gls)
2005–2008	CR Belouizdad	52	(4)
2008	TPS	0	(0)
2008–2009	CR Belouizdad	24	(1)
2009–2011	USM Alger	48	(0)
2011–2012	CR Belouizdad	7	(0)
2012–2016	USM El Harrach	90	(5)
2016–2018	ES Sétif	52	(6)
2018	MC Oran	9	(0)
2019	Al-Washm	9	(0)
2019–2020	Al-Ansar	34	(9)
2020–2021	Jeddah	30	(2)

International career
2007	Algeria U23		
- * Club domestic league appearances and goals as of 26 January 2019

Hamza Aït Ouamar (Kabyle: Ḥamza At Weɛmer; born 6 December 1986) is an Algerian football midfielder who last played for Jeddah.

== Biography ==
In 2007, he was voted for the most promising young player in Algerian football along with Tayeb Berramla and Fulham's Hamer Bouazza. He played for Algeria in All Africa Games in 2007.

In 2008, he joined Finnish side Turun Palloseura, but as his old club CR Belouizdad was refusing to let him play for another team, he didn't get any league match appearances in TPS. Even though the transfer was finally accepted by FIFA.

On August 8, 2011, Aït Ouamar signed a one-year contract with CR Belouizdad, joining them on a free transfer from USM Alger. It will be his third stint with the club.

== Honours ==
- Won the Algerian Cup once with CR Belouizdad in 2009
