= 2016–17 Algerian Ligue Professionnelle 1 =

Algerian Ligue Professionnelle 1
- Season: 2016–17
- Dates: 19 August 2016 – 14 June 2017
- Champions: ES Sétif; 4th Ligue 1 title 8th Algerian title
- Relegated: MO Béjaïa; CA Batna; RC Relizane
- Champions League: ES Sétif; MC Alger
- Confederation Cup: USM Alger
- Matches: 240
- Goals: 472 (1.97 per match)
- Top goalscorer: Ahmed Gasmi (14 goals)
- Biggest home win: USM Alger 6-0 RC Relizane (27 August 2016)
- Biggest away win: RC Relizane 0-3 NA Hussein Dey
- Highest scoring: USM Alger 6-2 USM Bel-Abbès (7 June 2017)
- Longest winning run: 5 matches ES Sétif
- Longest unbeaten run: 10 matches MC Oran
- Longest winless run: 10 matches MO Béjaïa
- Longest losing run: 4 matches RC Relizane
- All statistics correct as of 14 June 2017.

The 2016–17 Algerian Ligue Professionnelle 1was the 55th season of the Algerian Ligue Professionnelle 1 since its establishment in 1962. A total of 16 teams contested the league.

== Teams ==
Locations of teams for the 2016–17 Algerian Ligue Professionnelle 1

=== Stadiums ===
Team	Stadium	Capacity
CA Batna	Mustapha Seffouhi Stadium	5,000
CR Belouizdad	20 August 1955 Stadium	15,000
CS Constantine	Chahid Hamlaoui Stadium	35,000
DRB Tadjenanet	Smaïl Lahoua Stadium	9,000
ES Sétif	8 May 1945 Stadium	25,000
JS Kabylie	1 November 1954 Stadium	25,000
JS Saoura	20 August 1955 Stadium	20,000
MC Alger	Omar Hamadi Stadium	17,000
MC Oran	Ahmed Zabana Stadium	40,000
MO Béjaïa	Maghrebi Unity Stadium	25,000
NA Hussein Dey	20 August 1955 Stadium	15,000
Olympique de Médéa	Lyes Imam Stadium	12,000
RC Relizane	Tahar Zoughari Stadium	30,000
USM Alger	Omar Hamadi Stadium	17,000
USM Bel-Abbès	24 February 1956 Stadium	45,000
USM El Harrach	1 November 1954 Stadium	8,000

== Personnel and kits ==
=== Managerial changes ===
Managerial changes during the 2016-17 campaign.

=== Foreign players ===
Club	Player 1	Player 2	Player 3
CS Constantine	(Ivory Coast) Manucho		
ES Sétif	(Cameroon) Azongha Tembeng Abenego	(Madagascar) Ibrahim Amada	
JS Saoura	(Cameroon) Jean Jules Bapidi		
MO Béjaïa	(Chad) Morgan Betorangal	(Mali) Soumaila Sidibe	
USM Alger	(Madagascar) Carolus Andriamatsinoro	(Ivory Coast) Ghislain Guessan	
NA Hussein Dey	(Guinea) Mohamed Coumbassa	(Tunisia) Mehdi Ouertani	
USM El Harrach	~~(Guinea) Mohamed Coumbassa~~		

== Results ==
=== League table ===
Pos	Team	Pld	W	D	L	GF	GA	GD	Pts	Qualification or relegation
1	ES Sétif (C)	30	17	6	7	42	23	+19	57	Qualification for the 2018 CAF Champions League
2	MC Alger	30	14	8	8	38	27	+11	50 (Note: MC Alger ahead of USM Alger on head-to-head record: MCA–UAL 2–1, UAL–MCA 2–2.)	Qualification for the 2018 CAF Champions League
3	USM Alger	30	14	8	8	50	31	+19	50	Qualification for the 2018 CAF Confederation Cup
4	USM Bel-Abbès	30	14	6	10	37	33	+4	48	
5	JS Saoura	30	12	9	9	34	30	+4	45	
6	CR Belouizdad	30	12	7	11	30	25	+5	43	Qualification for the 2018 CAF Confederation Cup
7	MC Oran	30	9	13	8	24	25	−1	40 (Note: MC Oran ahead of NA Hussein Dey on head-to-head record: MCO–NAH 1–0, NAH–MCO 1–0 however goal difference in the first leg MCO (+7) NAH (+2).)	
8	NA Hussein Dey	30	11	7	12	38	37	+1	40	Qualification for 2017 Arab Club Championship
9	CS Constantine	30	10	9	11	34	33	+1	39 (Note: DRB Tadjenanet ahead of CS Constantine on head-to-head record: CSC–DRB 4–2, DRB–CSC 1–0.)	
10	DRB Tadjenanet	30	10	9	11	33	32	+1	39	
11	JS Kabylie	30	8	14	8	20	24	−4	38 (Note: JS Kabylie ahead of Olympique de Médéa on head-to-head record: JSK–OMM 0–1, OMM–JSK 1–2.)	
12	Olympique de Médéa	30	10	8	12	32	40	−8	38	
13	USM El Harrach	30	7	15	8	15	21	−6	36 (Note: RC Relizane ahead of USM El Harrach on head-to-head record: RCR–UEH 0–0, UEH–RCR 0–0 however goal difference in the first leg RCR (−8) UEH (−1).)	
14	RC Relizane (Note: RC Relizane were deducted 3 points.) (R)	30	12	6	12	34	32	+2	36	Relegation to Ligue Professionnelle 2
15	CA Batna (R)	30	6	7	17	20	42	−22	25	Relegation to Ligue Professionnelle 2
16	MO Béjaïa (Note: MO Béjaïa recorded a match lost by penalty against JS Saoura because they were reduced to less than 7 players (Art. 84 Regulation of the Ligue Professionnelle 1 / Art 89 Disciplinary Code). In addition, the Bejaia club was deprived of their share of the television rights for this match. It was also punished by a deduction of 1 point and a fine of 100,000 DA.) (R)	30	3	10	17	23	49	−26	18	Relegation to Ligue Professionnelle 2

Updated to match(es) played on 14 June 2017. Source: DZFoot
Rules for classification: 1) points; 2) head-to-head points; 3) head-to-head goal difference; 4) goal difference; 5) total goals; 6) fairplay ranking; 7) playoff.
(C) Champions; (R) Relegated

=== Result table ===
Home \ Away	CAB	CRB	CSC	DRBT	ESS	JSK	JSSR	MCA	MCO	MOB	NAH	OM	UAL	USMB	UEH	RCR
CA Batna		0–1	0–0	0–2	0–2	0–1	1–0	1–2	2–2	2–0	0–0	3–0	2–0	1–0	1–0	1–1
CR Belouizdad	1–0		1–2	1–0	1–0	1–1	1–0	1–0	1–1	3–0	3–2	1–1	0–1	0–1	2–0	1–0
CS Constantine	3–1	2–1		4–2	2–2	0–1	1–0	2–0	1–0	2–2	1–2	1–1	1–0	3–1	0–0	0–0
DRB Tadjenanet	4–1	1–2	1–0		1–0	1–0	2–0	0–1	1–1	1–1	2–0	1–0	0–0	0–0	1–0	2–1
ES Sétif	2–0	2–1	1–0	1–0		0–0	1–0	2–0	0–0	4–2	4–2	1–0	2–1	1–0	0–0	3–1
JS Kabylie	1–1	1–0	0–0	1–1	1–1		0–0	0–0	1–1	1–1	2–1	0–1	1–1	1–0	0–0	1–0
JS Saoura	2–1	1–1	1–0	2–1	2–1	1–0		0–0	2–0	3–0	2–1	1–1	1–0	3–0	4–1	1–0
MC Alger	1–0	1–0	2–1	2–1	1–2	1–1	0–0		1–0	4–1	1–1	4–0	2–1	3–1	0–1	2–0
MC Oran	0–0	0–2	2–1	2–2	1–0	0–0	3–1	0–0		2–1	1–0	2–1	0–0	1–0	1–0	2–2
MO Béjaïa	2–1	1–0	2–2	2–2	0–3	3–0	1–1	0–1	0–0		1–1	1–2	0–0	1–1	0–1	0–1
NA Hussein Dey	2–0	1–1	1–2	2–1	0–2	0–1	3–2	1–0	1–0	1–0		2–1	1–1	1–2	3–0	1–0
Olympique de Médéa	1–0	2–1	3–2	1–1	1–3	1–2	1–1	1–1	1–0	4–0	2–1		1–3	1–0	0–0	2–1
USM Alger	3–0	2–1	1–0	0–0	3–1	2–1	5–2	2–2	2–1	2–0	2–1	3–2		6–2	0–2	6–0
USM Bel Abbès	2–0	0–0	1–0	3–1	2–1	2–0	1–1	3–2	2–0	2–1	2–2	3–0	2–1		0–0	2–0
USM El Harrach	1–1	1–1	1–1	1–0	1–0	1–0	0–0	1–2	0–0	1–0	1–1	0–0	1–1	0–2		0–0
RC Relizane	5–0	1–0	3–0	3–1	0–0	3–1	3–0	3–2	0–1	1–0	0–3	1–0	2–0	2–0	0–0	

Updated to match(es) played on 23 April 2016. Source: DZFoot
Legend: Blue = home team win; Yellow = draw; Red = away team win.

== Positions by round ==
Team ╲ Round	1	2	3	4	5	6	7	8	9	10	11	12	13	14	15	16	17	18	19	20	21	22	23	24	25	26	27	28	29	30
ES Sétif	5	3	2	3	5	4	4	4	2	3	4	5	5	5	4	2	2	2	3	2	1	1	1	1	1	1	1	1	1	1
MC Alger	9	5	4	6	3	5	3	3	4	1	1	2	1	1	1	1	1	1	1	1	3	2	2	2	2	2	2	2	2	2
USM Alger	2	1	1	1	1	1	1	1	1	2	2	1	3	2	3	4	5	5	6	5	4	4	4	3	4	3	4	3	3	3
USM Bel Abbès	9	14	13	14	11	13	14	10	7	9	6	8	6	6	8	8	6	3	2	3	2	3	3	4	3	4	3	4	5	4
JS Saoura	14	10	11	12	14	12	11	8	8	5	7	6	7	7	6	6	7	7	7	7	7	5	6	5	7	5	6	5	4	5
CR Belouizdad	7	11	8	10	13	10	12	13	13	14	14	14	13	11	11	9	9	10	8	9	9	9	9	8	9	9	9	6	6	6
MC Oran	7	4	3	2	2	2	2	2	3	4	3	3	2	3	2	3	3	4	5	6	6	7	8	9	8	8	7	8	7	7
NA Hussein Dey	1	7	7	5	4	3	5	6	9	10	11	13	8	8	7	7	8	9	10	8	8	6	5	6	5	6	5	7	8	8
CS Constantine	5	12	12	13	10	6	6	5	6	7	10	10	11	13	14	14	13	13	11	12	13	12	14	14	14	11	13	13	11	9
DRB Tadjenanet	2	2	5	4	6	7	9	7	10	11	13	7	9	10	10	13	14	14	15	13	14	13	13	13	13	13	11	10	12	10
JS Kabylie	9	6	6	7	8	9	8	11	12	8	9	11	14	14	12	12	11	11	12	11	11	11	12	11	11	14	12	12	9	11
Olympique de Médéa	4	8	10	11	7	8	7	9	5	6	5	4	4	4	5	5	4	6	4	4	5	8	7	7	6	7	8	9	10	12
USM El Harrach	9	13	14	15	15	15	13	14	14	13	12	12	12	9	9	10	10	8	9	10	10	10	10	10	10	10	10	11	13	13
RC Relizane	16	16	16	16	16	16	16	16	16	15	15	15	15	15	15	15	15	15	13	14	12	14	11	12	12	12	14	14	14	14
CA Batna	13	9	9	8	9	11	10	12	11	12	8	9	10	12	13	11	12	12	14	15	15	15	15	15	15	15	15	15	15	15
MO Béjaïa	14	15	15	9	12	14	15	15	15	16	16	16	16	16	16	16	16	16	16	16	16	16	16	16	16	16	16	16	16	16

Leader
2018 CAF Champions League or 2018 CAF Confederation Cup
Relegation to Ligue Professionnelle 2 2017-18

Updated to match(es) played on 27 February 2016. Source: DZfoot.com (in French)

== Clubs season-progress ==
Team ╲ Round	1	2	3	4	5	6	7	8	9	10	11	12	13	14	15	16	17	18	19	20	21	22	23	24	25	26	27	28	29	30
CA Batna	L	W	L	W	D	L	D	L	W	L	W	L	D	L	D	W	L	L	D	L	D	D	L	L	W	L	L	L	L	L
CR Belouizdad	D	L	W	L	L	W	L	L	L	D	D	W	D	W	L	W	W	D	W	L	W	L	D	W	L	W	L	W	W	D
CS Constantine	D	L	D	L	W	W	W	D	L	L	L	D	D	L	L	L	W	D	W	L	L	W	L	D	D	W	D	W	W	W
DRB Tadjenanet	W	D	D	W	L	L	L	W	L	L	D	W	L	D	L	L	D	D	L	W	L	W	D	D	L	W	W	W	D	W
ES Sétif	D	W	W	D	L	W	D	W	W	D	L	L	W	L	W	W	L	W	D	W	W	W	W	W	L	D	W	W	W	L
JS Kabylie	D	W	D	D	D	L	D	L	D	W	D	L	L	L	W	D	W	L	D	W	D	L	D	D	D	L	W	W	W	D
JS Saoura	L	W	L	D	L	W	D	W	D	W	L	W	L	D	W	W	L	D	D	W	D	W	D	D	L	W	L	W	W	L
MC Alger	D	W	W	L	W	L	W	W	D	W	W	L	W	D	W	D	L	W	D	D	L	D	W	D	W	L	W	L	W	L
MC Oran	D	W	W	W	L	W	D	W	D	D	D	D	W	D	W	L	L	D	L	D	D	D	L	D	W	L	W	L	D	L
MO Béjaïa	L	D	D	W	L	L	D	D	L	W	L	D	L	D	L	D	D	D	L	L	L	W	L	L	L	D	L	L	L	D
NA Hussein Dey	W	L	D	W	D	W	L	L	L	D	D	L	W	W	W	W	L	L	D	W	D	W	W	L	W	L	D	L	L	D
Olympique de Médéa	W	L	L	D	W	L	W	L	W	D	W	W	W	D	D	L	W	L	D	W	L	L	D	D	W	L	L	L	L	D
RC Relizane	L	L	L	L	W	W	D	D	W	W	L	W	L	D	D	L	W	D	W	L	W	L	W	L	L	W	L	W	D	W
USM Alger	W	W	D	W	W	W	L	W	L	L	D	W	L	W	L	D	L	D	L	W	W	D	D	W	D	W	D	W	L	W
USM Bel-Abbès	D	L	D	L	W	L	D	W	W	L	W	L	W	W	L	W	W	W	W	L	W	L	D	D	W	D	W	L	L	W
USM El Harrach	D	L	D	L	D	L	W	L	W	W	W	D	D	D	D	L	W	W	D	L	D	L	D	W	D	D	D	L	D	D

Updated to match(es) played on 22 February 2017. Source: Clubs Season-Progress
W = Win; D = Draw; L = Lose

== Season statistics ==
=== Top scorers ===
R.	Goalscorer	Team	Goals
1	(Algeria) Ahmed Gasmi	NA Hussein Dey	14
2	(Algeria) Mohamed Amine Hamia	Olympique de Médéa & CR Belouizdad	13
3	(Algeria) Mourad Benayad	RC Relizane	11
4	(Algeria) Abousoufiane Balegh	USM Bel-Abbès	10
5	(Algeria) Ahmed Messadia	MO Béjaïa	9
5	(Algeria) Moustapha Djallit	JS Saoura	9
5	(Algeria) Mohamed Meftah	USM Alger	9
7	(Algeria) Abderrahmane Meziane	USM Alger	8
7	(Algeria) Rachid Nadji	ES Sétif	8
7	(Algeria) Akram Djahnit	ES Sétif	8
7	(Algeria) Habib Bouguelmouna	USM Bel-Abbès	8
7	(Algeria) Oussama Darfalou	USM Alger	8

Updated to games played on 14 June 2017
Source: soccerway.com

=== Hat-tricks ===
Player	For	Against	Result	Date	Ref
(Algeria) Oussama Darfalou	USM Alger	JS Saoura	5–2	14 June 2017	

=== Clean sheets ===
R.	Player	Club	Matches	Clean sheets
1	(Algeria) Moustapha Zeghba	USM El Harrach	28	16
2	(Algeria) Abderaouf Natèche	MC Oran	30	12
3	(Algeria) Hamza Bousseder	RC Relizane	22	11
3	(Algeria) Malik Asselah	JS Kabylie	28	11
5	(Algeria) Nadjib Ghoul	USM Bel-Abbès	18	9
5	(Algeria) Houari Djemili	JS Saoura	27	9

^{*} Only goalkeepers who played all 90 minutes of a match are taken into consideration. Updated to games played on 23 June 2017

=== Statistics referees ===
R.	Name	Matches	Yellow card	Yellow card Red card	Red card	First match	Last match
1	Lyés Bekouassa	27	105	1	1	20 August 2016	10 June 2017
2	Abderrezzak Arab	19	84	3	2	20 August 2016	20 May 2017
3	Lahlou Benbraham	18	70	1	1	20 August 2016	13 May 2017
4	Rafik Achouri	17	55	1	3	27 August 2016	7 June 2017
5	Mohamed Boukhalfa	14	29	0	0	27 August 2016	6 May 2017
6	Said Aouina	13	42	5	2	27 August 2016	14 June 2017
7	Mustapha Ghorbal	13	49	2	0	20 August 2016	10 June 2017
8	Mehdi Abid Charef	12	51	1	1	27 August 2016	14 June 2017
=	Ahmed Bouzrar	12	41	3	1	20 August 2016	14 June 2017
=	Merzak Halalchi	12	14	0	1	27 August 2016	7 June 2017

== Media coverage ==
Algerian Ligue Professionnelle 1 Media Coverage
Country	Television Channel	Matches
Algeria	Algerian TV (local); Canal Algérie; Algeria 3 Algeria 4	5 Matches per round
Qatar	beIN Sports Arabia	1 Match per round
Qatar	Al-Kass Sports Channel	Derbies Only

== See also ==
- 2016–17 Algerian Ligue Professionnelle 2
- 2016–17 Algerian Cup

== Notes ==
- On 20 August 2016 Indeed, the match RC Relizane - NA Hussein Dey has officially been deprogrammed. Neither the visiting team nor the officials could not reach the chamber of Stade Tahar Zoughari Relizane. "Cheer" premises have prevented access to teams and officials and protesting the non-qualification of new recruits to the West country club by the Football League.
