= 2015–16 NA Hussein Dey season =

NA Hussein Dey
2015–16 season
- Chairman: Mahfoud Ould Zmirli
- Head coach: Abdelkader Yaiche (until 12 September 2015); Youcef Bouzidi (from 12 September 2015)
- Stadium: Stade du 20 Août 1955
- Ligue 1: 11th
- Algerian Cup: Runners–up
- Top goalscorer: League: Ahmed Gasmi (12); All: Ahmed Gasmi (13)

In the 2015–16 season, NA Hussein Dey competed in the Ligue 1 for the 40th season, as well as the Algerian Cup.

== Squad list ==
Players and squad numbers last updated on 1 September 2015.
Note: Flags indicate national team as has been defined under FIFA eligibility rules. Players may hold more than one non-FIFA nationality.

No.	Nat.	Position	Name	Date of birth (age)	Signed from
Goalkeepers
1	(Algeria)	GK	Chemseddine Slimani	19 January 1989 (aged 26)	(Algeria) JSM Skikda
16	(Algeria)	GK	Kheireddine Boussouf	7 December 1987 (aged 27)	(Algeria) Olympique de Médéa
30	(Algeria)	GK	Abdelhamid Brahimi	27 May 1992 (aged 23)	(Algeria) Youth system
Defenders
4	(Algeria)		Mohamed Herida	28 March 1988 (aged 27)	(Algeria) USM Blida
5	(Algeria)		Hamza Zeddam	8 April 1984 (aged 31)	(Algeria) RC Arbaâ
17	(Algeria)		Ishak Guebli	25 April 1987 (aged 28)	(Algeria) CR Belouizdad
18	(Algeria)		Oussama Khellaf	15 March 1988 (aged 27)	(Algeria) ?
25	(Algeria)		Zinedine Benyahia	20 February 1990 (aged 25)	(Algeria) DRB Tadjenanet
28	(Algeria)		Kheireddine Benamrane	8 July 1994 (aged 21)	(Algeria) Paradou AC
31	(Algeria)		Slimani Allali	5 August 1991 (aged 24)	(Algeria) ?
	(Algeria)		Nassim Chadi	20 May 1994 (aged 21)	(Algeria) Youth system
	(Algeria)		Ibrahim Ferhat	7 March 1995 (aged 20)	(Algeria) Youth system
Midfielders
6	(Algeria)		Salim Boukhenchouche	6 October 1991 (aged 23)	(Algeria) AB Mérouana
7	(Algeria)		Sofiane Choubani	29 March 1990 (aged 25)	(Algeria) USM Bel-Abbès
8	(Algeria)		Sofiane Bendebka	9 August 1992 (aged 23)	(Algeria) Youth system
9	(Algeria)		Aymen Madi	26 December 1988 (aged 26)	(Algeria) RC Kouba
15	(Algeria)		Karim Ghazi	6 January 1979 (aged 36)	(Algeria) USM Blida
19	(Algeria)		Mehdi Benaldjia	14 May 1991 (aged 24)	(Algeria) DRB Tadjenanet
20	(Algeria)		Fouad Allag	17 April 1985 (aged 30)	(Algeria) CS Constantine
22	(Algeria)		Billal Ouali	15 May 1987 (aged 28)	(Algeria) MC Alger
	(Algeria)		Mohamed Lamine Chabi	3 July 1995 (aged 20)	(Algeria) Youth system
	(Algeria)		Kamel Hayi	27 June 1997 (aged 18)	(Algeria) Youth system
	(Algeria)		Elyes Seddiki	27 September 1988 (aged 26)	(Algeria) JS Kabylie
29	(Gabon)		Samson Mbingui	9 February 1992 (aged 23)	(Algeria) MC El Eulma
23	(Algeria)		Hocine Metref	1 January 1984 (aged 31)	(Algeria) RC Kouba
Forwards
10	(Algeria)		Ahmed Gasmi	22 November 1984 (aged 30)	(Algeria) ES Sétif
11	(Algeria)		Mourad Benayad	25 September 1990 (aged 24)	(Algeria) WRB M'Sila
14	(Algeria)		Lakhdar Drifel	18 August 1990 (aged 24)	(Algeria) Olympique de Médéa
24	(Algeria)		Ashraf Abdelamine Attia	3 March 1993 (aged 22)	(Algeria) USM Alger U21
27	(Algeria)		Zakaria Ouhadda	23 February 1986 (aged 29)	(Algeria) AS Khroub
	(Algeria)		Hichem Mokhtari	24 October 1991 (aged 23)	(Algeria) RC Relizane
	(Algeria)		Riad Ait Abdelmalek	19 June 1997 (aged 18)	(Algeria) Youth system

== Competitions ==
=== Overview ===
Competition	Record								Started round	Final position / round	First match	Last match
Competition	G	W	D	L	GF	GA	GD	Win %	Started round	Final position / round	First match	Last match
Ligue 1	30	10	10	10	31	35	−4	33.33	—N/a	11th	15 August 2015	27 May 2015
Algerian Cup	6	4	1	1	10	2	+8	66.67	Round of 64	Runners–up	19 December 2015	1 May 2016
Total	36	14	11	11	41	37	+4	38.89				

== League table ==
Pos	Team	Pld	W	D	L	GF	GA	GD	Pts	Qualification or relegation
9	USM El Harrach	30	10	11	9	28	27	+1	41	
10	MC Oran	30	9	13	8	40	35	+5	40 (Note: MC Oran ahead of NA Hussein Dey on head-to-head record: MCO–NAH 1–0, NAH–MCO 1–0.)	
11	NA Hussein Dey	30	10	10	10	31	35	−4	40	Qualification for the Arab Club Championship group stage
12	MC Alger	30	8	14	8	28	26	+2	38	Qualification for the Confederation Cup preliminary round
13	RC Relizane	30	8	12	10	36	35	+1	36 (Note: RC Relizane ahead of USM Blida on head-to-head record: RCR–USB 5–2, USB–RCR 1–0.)	

Updated to match(es) played on 27 May 2016. Source: DZFoot
Rules for classification: 1) points; 2) head-to-head points; 3) head-to-head goal difference; 4) goal difference; 5) total goals; 6) fairplay ranking; 7) playoff.

=== Results summary ===
Overall								Home						Away					
Pld	W	D	L	GF	GA	GD	Pts	W	D	L	GF	GA	GD	W	D	L	GF	GA	GD
30	10	10	10	31	35	−4	40	9	5	1	22	11	+11	1	5	9	9	24	−15

Last updated: 31 January 2015.
Source: Competitive matches

=== Results by round ===
Round	1	2	3	4	5	6	7	8	9	10	11	12	13	14	15	16	17	18	19	20	21	22	23	24	25	26	27	28	29	30
Ground	A	H	A	H	A	H	A	H	A	H	A	H	A	H	A	H	A	H	A	H	A	H	A	H	A	H	A	H	A	H
Result	W	L	L	L	D	D	D	D	W	W	L	W	L	W	L	D	D	D	W	L	W	W	D	D	L	W	L	W	L	D
Position	3	8	12	13	14	14	15	15	13	8	10	7	10	7	10	12	11	11	10	11	9	8	7	6	8	7	10	9	10	11

Updated to match(es) played on 31 January 2015. Source: Competitive matches
A = Away; H = Home; W = Win; D = Draw; L = Loss

=== Matches ===
Win Draw Loss

15 August 2015 Round 1	NA Hussein Dey	2–1	USM Alger	Belouizdad
17:00	Gasmi 32' (pen.); Benaldjia (yellow card) 33'; Bendebka 67'; Boussouf (yellow card) 35' (yellow-red card) 90'	Report; Live TV: None	48' Seguer; (red card) 90' Chafaï	Stadium: Stade 20 Août 1955; Referee: Benouza, Omari, Gourari

22 August 2015 Round 2	ASM Oran	2–1	NA Hussein Dey	Oran
17:30	Sebbah 67'; Herbache 81'	Report; Live TV: None	52' Gasmi	Stadium: Stade Habib Bouakeul; Referee: Arab, Biodh, Hamlaoui

27 August 2015 Round 3	NA Hussein Dey	0–3	CR Belouizdad	Blida
18:00		Report; Live TV: Algérie 3 / TV Tamazight 4	35', 64' Derrag; 45+3' Nekkache	Stadium: Stade Mustapha Tchaker; Referee: Abid Charef, Tamen, Boulfelfel

10 September 2015 Round 4	USM El Harrach	2–0	NA Hussein Dey	Algiers
18:00	Meziane 43'; Harrag 90' (pen.)	Report; Live TV: Algérie 3 / Canal Algérie		Stadium: Stade 5 Juillet 1962; Referee: Boukouassa, Brahimi, Rachedi

19 September 2015 Round 5	NA Hussein Dey	2–2	JS Saoura	Belouizdad
18:00	Guebli 25'; Gasmi 58' (pen.)	Report; Live TV: None	20' Bapidi Fils; 44' Zaïdi	Stadium: Stade 20 Août 1955; Referee: Bachir, Zerhouni, Hadj Said

28 September 2015 Round 6	USM Blida	0–0	NA Hussein Dey	Blida
18:00		Report; Live TV: None		Stadium: Stade Mustapha Tchaker; Referee: Saïdi, Miraoui, Abid

2 October 2015 Round 7	NA Hussein Dey	0–0	RC Relizane	Belouizdad
18:00		Report; Live TV: None		Stadium: Stade 20 Août 1955; Referee: Arab, Bioud, Hamlaoui

17 October 2015 Round 8	DRB Tadjenanet	1–1	NA Hussein Dey	Tadjenanet
16:00	Daouadji 52'	Report; Live TV: None	32' Ouhadda	Stadium: Lahoua Smaïl Stadium; Attendance: 0 (close doors); Referee: Boukhalfa, Itchiali, Zerhouni

24 October 2015 Round 9	NA Hussein Dey	2–1	MC Alger	Algiers
16:00	Allali 41'; Ouhadda 45'	Report; Live TV: Algérie 3 / Canal Algérie	69' Merzougi	Stadium: Stade 5 Juillet 1962; Referee: Houasnia, Salaouandji, Bourouba

30 October 2015 Round 10	NA Hussein Dey	2–1	JS Kabylie	Belouizdad
15:00	Gasmi 38'; Benayad 80'	Report; Live TV: None	65' Boulaouidet	Stadium: Stade 20 Août 1955; Referee: Necib, Meghlout, Benaceur

6 November 2015 Round 11	RC Arbaâ	3–1	NA Hussein Dey	Larbaâ
15:00	Khaled 4'; Guessan 56'; Mahsas 59'	Report; Live TV: None	90' Bendebka	Stadium: Stade Ismaïl Makhlouf; Referee: Benbraham, Goumari, Allaoua

20 November 2015 Round 12	NA Hussein Dey	1–0	ES Sétif	Belouizdad
17:00	Benaldjia 4'	Report; Live TV: None		Stadium: Stade 20 Août 1955; Referee: Ghorbane, Benali, Abid

28 November 2015 Round 13	MC Oran	1–0	NA Hussein Dey	Oran
16:00	Larbi 63'	Report; Live TV: None		Stadium: Stade Ahmed Zabana; Referee: Zouaoui, Kechida, Hamiti

10 December 2015 Round 14	NA Hussein Dey	1–0	CS Constantine	Belouizdad
17:00	Gasmi 49'	Report; Live TV: None		Stadium: Stade 20 Août 1955; Referee: Boukhalfa, Zerhouni, Benali

25 December 2015 Round 15	MO Béjaïa	3–1	NA Hussein Dey	Béjaïa
16:00	Lakhdari 12', 56'; Ndoye 72' (pen.)	Report; Live TV: TV Tamazight 4 / Algérie 3	10' Herida	Stadium: Stade de l'Unité Maghrébine; Referee: Arab, Bioud, Hamlaoui

14 January 2016 Round 16	USM Alger	1–1	NA Hussein Dey	Algiers
18:00	Nadji 16'	Report; Live TV: TV Tamazight 4 / beIN Sports / Canal Algérie	15' (pen.) Gasmi	Stadium: Stade 5 Juillet 1962; Referee: Ghorbal, Omari, Hadj Said

23 January 2016 Round 17	NA Hussein Dey	1–1	ASM Oran	Belouizdad
16:00	Choubani 90+1'	Report; Live TV: None	84' Djemaouni	Stadium: Stade 20 Août 1955; Referee: Bouzerar, Idir, Messaoudi

30 January 2016 Round 18	CR Belouizdad	1–1	NA Hussein Dey	Algiers
16:00	Feham 73'	Report; Live TV: Algérie 3	90+1' Gasmi	Stadium: Stade 5 Juillet 1962; Referee: Mial, Itchiali, Béchirène

6 February 2016 Round 19	NA Hussein Dey	3–0	USM El Harrach	Algiers
16:00	Gasmi 10' (pen.); Ouhadda 22'; Choubani 46'	Report; Live TV: TV Tamazight 4 / Algérie 3		Stadium: Stade 5 Juillet 1962; Referee: Necib, Seradj, Meghloute

12 February 2016 Round 20	JS Saoura	4–0	NA Hussein Dey	Béchar
18:00	Djallit 20' (pen.), 31', 90+2'; Zaidi 40'	Report; Live TV: None		Stadium: Stade 20 Août 1955; Referee: Benouza, Ayad, Zerhouni

27 February 2016 Round 21	NA Hussein Dey	2–0	USM Blida	Belouizdad
16:00	Choubani 8'; Gasmi 45+3'	Report; Live TV: None		Stadium: Stade 20 Août 1955; Referee: Benbraham, Gourari, Alaoua

12 March 2016 Round 22	RC Relizane	1–3	NA Hussein Dey	Relizane
16:00	Bourdim 66' (pen.)	Report	23', 52' Mokhtari; 88' Drifel	Stadium: Stade Tahar Zoughari; Attendance: 0 (close doors); Referee: Zouaoui, Halitim, Zemit

19 March 2016 Round 23	NA Hussein Dey	2–2	DRB Tadjenanet	Belouizdad
16:00	Herida 28'; Gasmi 70' (pen.)	Report; Live TV: None	77' El Moudene; 90' (pen.) Sayoud	Stadium: Stade 20 Août 1955; Referee: Boukhalfa, Etchiali, Zermombouni

1 April 2016 Round 24	MC Alger	0–0	NA Hussein Dey	Algiers
17:00		Report; Live TV: Canal Algérie		Stadium: Stade 5 Juillet 1962; Referee: Arab, Bioud, Hamlaoui

9 April 2016 Round 25	JS Kabylie	1–0	NA Hussein Dey	Tizi Ouzou
16:00	Boulaouidet 22'	Report; Live TV: Algérie 3		Stadium: Stade 1er Novembre 1954; Referee: Achouri, Gourari, Benhammouda

22 April 2016 Round 26	NA Hussein Dey	3–0	RC Arbaâ	Belouizdad
16:00	Gasmi 9', 76'; Drifel 77'	Report; Live TV: None		Stadium: Stade 20 Août 1955; Referee: Brahim, Boulekrinet, Badache

26 April 2016 Round 27	ES Sétif	3–0	NA Hussein Dey	Sétif
17:00	Ziaya 5' (pen.), 34', 60'	Report; Live TV: None		Stadium: Stade 8 Mai 1945; Referee: Bouzrar, Yahi, Lassami

13 May 2016 Round 28	NA Hussein Dey	1–0	MC Oran	Belouizdad
17:30	Ait Abdelmalek 74'	Report; Live TV: None		Stadium: Stade 20 Août 1955; Referee: Abid-Charef, Boufelfel, Saâdi

20 May 2016 Round 29	CS Constantine	1–0	NA Hussein Dey	Constantine
17:30	Ahmed 28'	Report; Live TV: None		Stadium: Stade Mohamed Hamlaoui; Referee: Boukhalfa, Zerhouni, Benali

27 May 2016 Round 30	NA Hussein Dey	0–0	MO Béjaïa	Belouizdad
17:30		Report; Live TV: None		Stadium: Stade 20 Août 1955; Referee: Benouza, Omari, Ayad

== Algerian Cup ==
19 December 2015 Round of 64	NA Hussein Dey	5–0	NRB Bouchegouf	Belouizdad
16:00	Herida 73', 81'; Drifel 83', 88'; Ouhadda 86'			Stadium: Stade 20 Août 1955; Referee: Hakim Boussaid

9 January 2016 Round of 32	NA Hussein Dey	0–0 (a.e.t.) (4–3 p)	JS Saoura	Belouizdad
16:00				Stadium: Stade 20 Août 1955; Referee: Boubekeur Zouaoui
	Penalties
	Ouhadda (penalty scored); Zeddam (penalty scored); Allali (penalty scored); Ghazi (penalty missed); Ouali (penalty scored)		(penalty scored) Djallit; (penalty scored) Bapidi Fils; (penalty missed) Tiouli; (penalty scored) Belkheir; (penalty missed) Lagraa

20 February 2016 Round of 16	MO Béjaïa	1–2 (a.e.t.)	NA Hussein Dey	Béjaïa
16:00	Ndoye 58'		Benaldjia 16', 91'	Stadium: Stade de l'Unité Maghrébine; Referee: Liés Bekouassa

4 March 2016 Quarter-finals	NA Hussein Dey	2–0	Paradou AC	Belouizdad
16:00	M’bingui 10'; Gasmi 45'	Live TV: TV Tamazight 4		Stadium: Stade 20 Août 1955; Referee: Mehdi Abid Charef

14 April 2016 Semi-finals	NA Hussein Dey	1–0	USM Bel-Abbès	Algiers
17:00	Mbingui 90'	Live TV: Algérie 3 / Al Kass Sports		Stadium: Stade 5 Juillet 1962; Referee: Redouane Necib

1 May 2016 Final	MC Alger	1-0	NA Hussein Dey	Algiers
16:30	Hachoud 81'	Report; Live TV: beIN Sports / Canal Algérie / Al Kass Sports / Algérie 3		Stadium: Stade 5 Juillet 1962; Referee: Mohamed Benouza

== Squad information ==
=== Playing statistics ===
No.	Pos	Nat	Player	Total		Ligue 1		Algerian Cup	
No.	Pos	Nat	Player	Apps	Goals	Apps	Goals	Apps	Goals
Goalkeepers
1	GK	(Algeria) ALG	Chemseddine Slimani	4	0	4	0	0	0
16	GK	(Algeria) ALG	Kheireddine Boussouf	28	0	28	0	0	0
30	GK	(Algeria) ALG	Abdelhamid Brahimi	0	0	0	0	0	0
Defenders
4	DF	(Algeria) ALG	Mohamed Herida	19	2	19	2	0	0
5	DF	(Algeria) ALG	Hamza Zeddam	20	0	20	0	0	0
17	DF	(Algeria) ALG	Ishak Guebli	20	1	20	1	0	0
18	DF	(Algeria) ALG	Oussama Khellaf	20	0	20	0	0	0
25	DF	(Algeria) ALG	Zinedine Benyahia	1	0	1	0	0	0
28	DF	(Algeria) ALG	Kheireddine Benamrane	0	0	0	0	0	0
31	DF	(Algeria) ALG	Slimani Allali	22	1	22	1	0	0
	DF	(Algeria) ALG	Mohamed Chadi	2	0	2	0	0	0
	DF	(Algeria) ALG	Ibrahim Ferhat	2	0	2	0	0	0
Midfielders
6	MF	(Algeria) ALG	Salim Boukhenchouche	8	0	8	0	0	0
7	MF	(Algeria) ALG	Sofiane Choubani	16	3	16	3	0	0
8	MF	(Algeria) ALG	Sofiane Bendebka	26	2	26	2	0	0
9	MF	(Algeria) ALG	Aymen Madi	3	0	3	0	0	0
15	MF	(Algeria) ALG	Karim Ghazi	21	0	21	0	0	0
19	MF	(Algeria) ALG	Mehdi Benaldjia	19	1	19	1	0	0
20	MF	(Algeria) ALG	Fouad Allag	8	0	8	0	0	0
22	MF	(Algeria) ALG	Billal Ouali	23	0	23	0	0	0
	MF	(Algeria) ALG	Lamine Chabi	6	0	6	0	0	0
	MF	(Algeria) ALG	Kamel Hayi	1	0	1	0	0	0
	MF	(Algeria) ALG	Elyes Seddiki	10	1	10	1	0	0
29	MF	(Gabon) GAB	Samson Mbingui	18	0	18	0	0	0
Forwards
10	FW	(Algeria) ALG	Ahmed Gasmi	29	12	29	12	0	0
11	FW	(Algeria) ALG	Mourad Benayad	22	1	22	1	0	0
14	FW	(Algeria) ALG	Lakhdar Drifel	16	1	16	1	0	0
24	FW	(Algeria) ALG	Ashraf Attia	9	0	9	0	0	0
27	FW	(Algeria) ALG	Zakaria Ouhadda	26	3	26	3	0	0
	FW	(Algeria) ALG	Hichem Mokhtari	10	2	10	2	0	0
	FW	(Algeria) ALG	Riad Ait Abdelmalek	5	0	5	0	0	0
Players transferred out during the season
23	MF	(Algeria) ALG	Hocine Metref	11	0	11	0	0	0

Last updated: 19 November 2017

=== Goalscorers ===
Includes all competitive matches. The list is sorted alphabetically by surname when total goals are equal.

No.	Nat.	Player	Pos.	L 1	AC	TOTAL
10	(Algeria)	Ahmed Gasmi	FW	12	1	13
27	(Algeria)	Zakaria Ouhadda	FW	3	1	4
4	(Algeria)	Mohamed Herida	DF	2	2	4
7	(Algeria)	Sofiane Choubani	MF	3	0	3
19	(Algeria)	Mehdi Benaldjia	MF	1	2	3
14	(Algeria)	Lakhdar Drifel	FW	1	2	3
	(Algeria)	Hichem Mokhtari	FW	2	0	2
8	(Algeria)	Sofiane Bendebka	MF	2	0	2
29	(Gabon)	Samson Mbingui	MF	0	2	2
17	(Algeria)	Ishak Guebli	DF	1	0	1
31	(Algeria)	Slimani Allali	DF	1	0	1
	(Algeria)	Elyes Seddiki	MF	1	0	1
11	(Algeria)	Mourad Benayad	FW	1	0	1
Own Goals				1	0	1
Totals				31	10	41

== Transfers ==
=== In ===
Date	Pos	Player	From club	Transfer fee	Source
29 June 2015	DF	(Algeria) Hamza Zeddam	RC Arbaâ	Free transfer	
1 July 2015	GK	(Algeria) Kheireddine Boussouf	Olympique de Médéa	Undisclosed	
1 July 2015	GK	(Algeria) Chemseddine Slimani	JSM Skikda	Undisclosed	
1 July 2015	DF	(Algeria) Zinedine Benyahia	DRB Tadjenanet	Undisclosed	
1 July 2015	MF	(Algeria) Fouad Allag	CS Constantine	Free transfer	
1 July 2015	MF	(Algeria) Mehdi Benaldjia	DRB Tadjenanet	Undisclosed	
1 July 2015	FW	(Algeria) Lakhdar Drifel	Olympique de Médéa	Free transfer	
17 July 2015	MF	(Algeria) Billal Ouali	MC Alger	Free transfer	
17 July 2015	FW	(Algeria) Ahmed Gasmi	ES Sétif	Undisclosed	
20 July 2015	MF	(Algeria) Sofiane Choubani	USM Bel-Abbès	Free transfer	
30 July 2015	MF	(Gabon) Samson Mbingui	MC El Eulma	Free transfer	
31 July 2015	DF	(Algeria) Kheireddine Benamrane	Paradou AC U21	Undisclosed	
1 January 2016	MF	(Algeria) Hichem Mokhtari	RC Relizane	Undisclosed	
5 January 2016	MF	(Algeria) Elyes Seddiki	JS Kabylie	Undisclosed	

=== Out ===
Date	Pos	Player	To club	Transfer fee	Source
3 July 2015	FW	(Algeria) Amine Touahri	RC Relizane	Free transfer	
