= 2016–17 NA Hussein Dey season =

NA Hussein Dey
2016–17 season
- Chairman: Mahfoud Ould Zmirli
- Head coach: Youcef Bouzidi (until 22 October 2016); Alain Michel (from 24 October 2016)
- Stadium: Stade du 20 Août 1955
- Ligue 1: 8th
- Algerian Cup: Quarter-finals
- Top goalscorer: League: Ahmed Gasmi (14); All: Ahmed Gasmi (15)

In the 2016–17 season, NA Hussein Dey competed in the Ligue 1 for the 41st season, as well as the Algerian Cup.

== Mid-season ==
=== Overview ===
Competition	Record								Started round	Final position / round	First match	Last match
Competition	G	W	D	L	GF	GA	GD	Win %	Started round	Final position / round	First match	Last match
Ligue 1	30	11	7	12	38	37	+1	36.67	—N/a	8th	20 August 2016	14 June 2017
Algerian Cup	4	2	1	1	3	4	−1	50.00	Round of 64	Quarter-finals	26 November 2016	1 April 2017
Total	34	13	8	13	41	41	+0	38.24				

== League table ==
Pos	Team	Pld	W	D	L	GF	GA	GD	Pts	Qualification or relegation
6	CR Belouizdad	30	12	7	11	30	25	+5	43	Qualification for the 2018 CAF Confederation Cup
7	MC Oran	30	9	13	8	24	25	−1	40 (Note: MC Oran ahead of NA Hussein Dey on head-to-head record: MCO–NAH 1–0, NAH–MCO 1–0 however goal difference in the first leg MCO (+7) NAH (+2).)	
8	NA Hussein Dey	30	11	7	12	38	37	+1	40	Qualification for 2017 Arab Club Championship
9	CS Constantine	30	10	9	11	34	33	+1	39 (Note: DRB Tadjenanet ahead of CS Constantine on head-to-head record: CSC–DRB 4–2, DRB–CSC 1–0.)	
10	DRB Tadjenanet	30	10	9	11	33	32	+1	39	

Updated to match(es) played on 14 June 2017. Source: DZFoot
Rules for classification: 1) points; 2) head-to-head points; 3) head-to-head goal difference; 4) goal difference; 5) total goals; 6) fairplay ranking; 7) playoff.

=== Results summary ===
Overall								Home						Away					
Pld	W	D	L	GF	GA	GD	Pts	W	D	L	GF	GA	GD	W	D	L	GF	GA	GD
29	11	7	11	38	37	+1	40	9	2	3	20	13	+7	2	5	8	18	24	−6

Last updated: 30 January 2016.
Source: Competitive matches

=== Results by round ===
Round	1	2	3	4	5	6	7	8	9	10	11	12	13	14	15	16	17	18	19	20	21	22	23	24	25	26	27	28	29	30
Ground	A	H	A	H	A	H	A	A	H	A	H	A	H	A	H	H	A	H	A	H	A	H	H	A	H	A	H	A	H	A
Result	W	L	D	W	D	W	L	L	L	D	D	L	W	W	W	W	L	L	D	W	D	W	W	L	W	L	D	L	L	D
Position	1	7	7	5	4	3	5	6	9	10	11	13	8	8	7	7	8	9	10	8	8	6	5	6	5	6	5	7	8	8

Updated to match(es) played on 30 January 2016. Source: Competitive matches
A = Away; H = Home; W = Win; D = Draw; L = Loss

=== Matches ===
Win Draw Loss

20 August 2016 Round 1	RC Relizane	0–3 (Note: On 20 August 2016 Indeed, the match RC Relizane - NA Hussein Dey has officially been deprogrammed. Neither the visiting team nor the officials could not reach the chamber of Stade Tahar Zoughari Relizane. "Cheer" premises have prevented access to teams and officials and protesting the non-qualification of new recruits to the West country club by the Football League.)	NA Hussein Dey	Relizane
17:30		Soccerway report Live TV: None		Stadium: Stade Tahar Zoughari

26 August 2016 Round 2	NA Hussein Dey	0–1	JS Kabylie	Belouizdad
17:45		Report; Live TV: EPTV Terrestre / TV Tamazight 4	22' Mebarki	Stadium: Stade 20 Août 1955; Referee: Mustapha Ghorbal

10 September 2016 Round 3	USM Bel-Abbès	2–2	NA Hussein Dey	Sidi Bel Abbès
19:00	Ali Amiri 20'; Balegh 79'	Report; Live TV: None	40' (pen.) Bendebka; 53' Mokhtari	Stadium: Stade 24 Fevrier 1956; Referee: Mehdi Abid Charef

16 September 2016 Round 4	NA Hussein Dey	1–0	MC Alger	Algiers
17:45	Bendebka 29'	Report; Live TV: EPTV Terrestre / TV Tamazight 4		Stadium: Stade du 5 Juillet 1962; Referee: Lahlou Benbraham

22 September 2016 Round 5	USM El Harrach	1–1	NA Hussein Dey	Algiers
17:00	Aichi 60'	Report; Live TV: None	49' (pen.) Gasmi	Stadium: Stade du 5 Juillet 1962; Attendance: 0 (close doors); Referee: Merzak Halalchi

30 September 2016 Round 6	NA Hussein Dey	2–0	CA Batna	Belouizdad
16:00	Gasmi 8'; Harrouche 87'	Report; Live TV: TV Tamazight 4		Stadium: Stade 20 Août 1955; Referee: Boubekeur Zouaoui

13 October 2016 Round 7	Olympique de Médéa	2–1	NA Hussein Dey	Médéa
16:00	Addadi 46'; Gharbi 87'	Report; Live TV: Canal Algérie / TV Tamazight 4	73' Khiat	Stadium: Stade Imam Lyes de Médéa; Referee: Mustapha Ghorbal

21 October 2016 Round 8	MC Oran	1–0	NA Hussein Dey	Oran
16:00	Bentiba 34'	Report; Live TV: Canal Algérie / EPTV Terrestre		Stadium: Stade Ahmed Zabana; Referee: Said Aouina

29 October 2016 Round 9	NA Hussein Dey	0–2	ES Sétif	Belouizdad
16:00		Report; Live TV: TV Tamazight 4	44' Amokrane; 82' Nadji	Stadium: Stade 20 Août 1955; Referee: Ahmed Bouzrar

4 November 2016 Round 10	JS Saoura	2–1	NA Hussein Dey	Béchar
19:00	Djallit 40'; Hammia 41'	Report; Live TV: None	90' Hérida	Stadium: Stade 20 Août 1955; Referee: Mohamed Benabdellah

11 November 2016 Round 11	NA Hussein Dey	1–1	CR Belouizdad	Algiers
16:00	Ardji 58'	Report; Live TV: EPTV Terrestre / Canal Algérie	69' Bougueroua	Stadium: Stade du 5 Juillet 1962; Referee: Merzak Halalchi

17 November 2016 Round 12	USM Alger	2–1	NA Hussein Dey	Algiers
17:00	Guessan 54', 70'	Report; Live TV: TV Tamazight 4 / Canal Algérie / beIN Sports	58' Ardji	Stadium: Stade 5 Juillet 1962; Referee: Lahlou Benbraham

3 December 2016 Round 13	NA Hussein Dey	2–1	DRB Tadjenanet	Belouizdad
16:00	Gasmi 14'; Khiat 66'	Report; Live TV: Canal Algérie	52' (pen.) Chibane	Stadium: August 20, 1955 Stadium; Referee: Abderrezzak Arab

10 December 2016 Round 14	CS Constantine	1–2	NA Hussein Dey	Constantine
16:00	Manucho 47'	Report; Live TV: Canal Algérie	8' Abid; 12' Gasmi	Stadium: Stade Mohamed Hamlaoui; Referee: Mustapha Ghorbal

24 December 2016 Round 15	NA Hussein Dey	1–0	MO Béjaïa	Belouizdad
16:00	Khiat 11'	Report; Live TV: TV Tamazight 4		Stadium: August 20, 1955 Stadium; Referee: Mustapha Bessiri

21 January 2017 Round 16	NA Hussein Dey	1–0	RC Relizane	Belouizdad
16:00	Laribi 60'	Report; Live TV: None		Stadium: August 20, 1955 Stadium; Referee: Amine Hansal

5 April 2017 Round 17	JS Kabylie	2–1	NA Hussein Dey	Tizi Ouzou
16:00; Match rescheduled due to share some of their players in the African Cup and World Cup military	Rial 37'; Baïteche 54'	Report; Live TV: None	16' Ardji	Stadium: November 1, 1954 Stadium; Attendance: 0 (close doors); Referee: Mohamed Saïdi

3 February 2017 Round 18	NA Hussein Dey	1–2	USM Bel-Abbès	Belouizdad
16:00	Gasmi 24' (pen.)	Report; Live TV: EPTV Terrestre / Canal Algérie	5' Balegh; 41' Benabderahmane	Stadium: August 20, 1955 Stadium; Referee: Lahlou Benbraham

7 February 2017 Round 19	MC Alger	1–1	NA Hussein Dey	Algiers
18:00	Seguer 87'	Report; Live TV: Canal Algérie	84' (pen.) Gasmi	Stadium: July 5, 1962 Stadium; Referee: Elias Bekouassa

16 February 2017 Round 20	NA Hussein Dey	3–0	USM El Harrach	Algiers
17:00	Gasmi 38' (pen.); Abid 45+2'; El Orfi 90+2'	Report; Live TV: Canal Algérie / TV Tamazight 4		Stadium: July 5, 1962 Stadium; Referee: Merzak Halalchi

24 February 2017 Round 21	CA Batna	0–0	NA Hussein Dey	Batna
15:00		Report; Live TV: None		Stadium: Mustapha Seffouhi Stadium; Referee: Mohamed Boukhalfa

4 March 2017 Round 22	NA Hussein Dey	2–1	Olympique de Médéa	Belouizdad
17:00	Gasmi 33', 87'	Report; Live TV: TV Tamazight 4	76' Gharbi	Stadium: August 20, 1955 Stadium; Referee: Ahmed Bouzrar

11 March 2017 Round 23	NA Hussein Dey	1–0	MC Oran	Belouizdad
15:00	Bendebka 26' (pen.)	Report; Live TV: Canal Algérie		Stadium: August 20, 1955 Stadium; Referee: Amine Hansal

17 March 2017 Round 24	ES Sétif	4–2	NA Hussein Dey	Sétif
18:00	Nadji 11'; Bougueroua 29'; Aït Ouamar 51'; Djahnit 72'	Report; Live TV: None	45' Bendebka; 90+4' Daouadji	Stadium: Stade 8 Mai 1945; Referee: Mohamed Boukhalfa

7 May 2017 Round 25	NA Hussein Dey	3–2	JS Saoura	Belouizdad
16:00	Gasmi 10', 90+3' (pen.); Herida 52'	Report; Live TV: Algérie 3	31' Hammia; 37' Merbah	Stadium: August 20, 1955 Stadium; Referee: Rafik Achouri

13 May 2017 Round 26	CR Belouizdad	3–2	NA Hussein Dey	Algiers
16:00	Feham 2', 74'; Namani 89'	Report; Live TV: Canal Algérie	43' (pen.) Gasmi; 90+3' Bendebka	Stadium: July 5, 1962 Stadium; Referee: Abderrezzak Arab

29 May 2017 Round 27	NA Hussein Dey	1–1	USM Alger	Algiers
22:30	Coumbassa 5'	Report; Live TV: TV Tamazight 4 / Al-Kass Sports	7' Meziane	Stadium: July 5, 1962 Stadium; Referee: Ahmed Bouzerar

7 June 2017 Round 28	DRB Tadjenanet	2–0	NA Hussein Dey	Tadjenanet
17:00	El Moudene 58' (pen.); Demane 62'	Report; Live TV: None		Stadium: Lahoua Smaïl Stadium; Referee: Mustapha Bessiri

10 June 2017 Round 29	NA Hussein Dey	1–2	CS Constantine	Belouizdad
17:00	Gasmi 20' (pen.)	Report; Live TV: None	10' Rebih; 24' Bezzaz	Stadium: August 20, 1955 Stadium; Referee: Mustapha Ghorbal

14 June 2017 Round 30	MO Béjaïa	1–1	NA Hussein Dey	Béjaïa
22:30	Touati 84'	Report; Live TV: None	71' Gasmi	Stadium: Maghrebi Unity Stadium; Referee: Ramdane Oukil

== Algerian Cup ==
26 November 2016 Round of 64	MO Béjaïa	0–1	NA Hussein Dey	Sétif
14:45		Report; Live TV: None	Gasmi 51'	Stadium: Stade 8 Mai 1945; Attendance: 0 (close doors); Referee: Boukhalfa, Zerhouni, Benali

17 December 2016 Round of 32	IS Tighennif	0–2	NA Hussein Dey	Mascara
15:00		Report; Live TV: None	Abid 11' (pen.); El Orfi 56' (pen.)	Stadium: Stade de l'Unité Africaine; Referee: Taroudi, Boudima, Saâdi

28 December 2016 Round of 16	Paradou AC	0–0 (a.e.t.) (5–6 p)	NA Hussein Dey	Dar El Beïda
14:30		Report; Live TV: TV Tamazight 4		Stadium: Stade Omar Benrabah; Referee: Benouza, Hemar, Ayed
	Penalties
	Benouadah (penalty scored); Benyoucef (penalty scored); Messibah (penalty scored); Bouabta (penalty scored); Mansouri (penalty scored); Benkhelifa (penalty missed)		(penalty scored) Abid; (penalty scored) Ardji; (penalty scored) Zeddam; (penalty scored) Bendebka; (penalty scored) Khiat; (penalty scored) Ouali

1 April 2017 Quarter-finals	USM Bel-Abbès	4–0	NA Hussein Dey	Sidi Bel Abbès
16:00	Balegh 72'; Zouari 76'; Bouguelmouna 79', 84'	Report; Live TV: Algérie 3		Stadium: Stade 24 Fevrier 1956; Referee: S. Aouina, Kechida, F. Aouina

== Squad information ==
=== Playing statistics ===
No.	Pos	Nat	Player	Total		Ligue 1		Algerian Cup	
No.	Pos	Nat	Player	Apps	Goals	Apps	Goals	Apps	Goals
Goalkeepers
30	GK	(Algeria) ALG	Azzedine Doukha	23	0	23	0	0	0
16	GK	(Algeria) ALG	Gaya Merbah	6	0	6	0	0	0
Defenders
24	DF	(Algeria) ALG	Youcef Benamara	14	0	14	0	0	0
35	DF	(Algeria) ALG	Abdelghani Bouzidi	6	0	6	0	0	0
	DF	(Algeria) ALG	Ismaïl Idris Chekhmam	1	0	1	0	0	0
15	DF	(Algeria) ALG	Karim Ghazi	11	0	11	0	0	0
4	DF	(Algeria) ALG	Mohamed Herida	18	2	18	2	0	0
39	DF	(Algeria) ALG	Naoufel Khacef	14	0	14	0	0	0
23	DF	(Algeria) ALG	Abdelghani Khiat	20	3	20	3	0	0
25	DF	(Algeria) ALG	Hocine Laribi	12	1	12	1	0	0
20	DF	(Algeria) ALG	Mourad Satli	12	0	12	0	0	0
5	DF	(Algeria) ALG	Hamza Zeddam	21	0	21	0	0	0
	DF	(Algeria) ALG	Ramzi Zemiti	3	0	3	0	0	0
Midfielders
	MF	(Algeria) ALG	Riad Ait Abdelmalek	5	0	5	0	0	0
26	MF	(Algeria) ALG	Oualid Ardji	26	2	26	2	0	0
8	MF	(Algeria) ALG	Sofiane Bendebka	25	5	25	5	0	0
19	MF	(Algeria) ALG	Zakaria Benhocine	9	0	9	0	0	0
29	MF	(Guinea) GUI	Mohamed Coumbassa	11	1	11	1	0	0
6	MF	(Algeria) ALG	Hocine El Orfi	18	1	18	1	0	0
22	MF	(Algeria) ALG	Billal Ouali	22	0	22	0	0	0
17	MF	(Tunisia) TUN	Mehdi Ouertani	13	0	13	0	0	0
Forwards
13	FW	(Algeria) ALG	Lamine Abid	17	2	17	2	0	0
11	FW	(Algeria) ALG	Abdellah Djelloul Daouadji	9	2	9	2	0	0
7	FW	(Algeria) ALG	Saïd Ferguène	2	0	2	0	0	0
10	FW	(Algeria) ALG	Ahmed Gasmi	26	14	26	14	0	0
	FW	(Algeria) ALG	Ali Haroun	2	0	2	0	0	0
9	FW	(Algeria) ALG	Hichem Mokhtari	21	1	21	1	0	0
27	FW	(Algeria) ALG	Zakaria Ouhadda	14	0	14	0	0	0
	FW	(Algeria) ALG	Benamar Rahmoune	1	0	1	0	0	0
Players transferred out during the season
	FW	(Algeria) ALG	Mohamed Noureddine Benai	7	0	7	0	0	0

Last updated: 12 June 2018
Source: fr.soccerway.com

== Squad list ==
As of 15 January 2017:

Note: Flags indicate national team as defined under FIFA eligibility rules; some limited exceptions apply. Players may hold more than one non-FIFA nationality.

No.	Pos.	Nation	Player
1	GK	ALG	Nassim Chadi
4	DF	ALG	Mohamed Herida
5	DF	ALG	Hamza Zeddam
6	MF	ALG	Hocine El Orfi
7	FW	ALG	Saïd Ferguène
8	MF	ALG	Sofiane Bendebka (captain)
9	FW	ALG	Hichem Mokhtar
10	FW	ALG	Ahmed Gasmi
11	FW	ALG	Abdellah Djelloul Daouadji
13	FW	ALG	Lamine Abid
15	MF	ALG	Karim Ghazi
16	GK	ALG	Gaya Merbah
17	DF	TUN	Mehdi Ouertani

No.	Pos.	Nation	Player
19	MF	ALG	Zakaria Benhocine
20	MF	ALG	Mourad Satli
22	MF	ALG	Billal Ouali
23	MF	ALG	Abdelghani Khiat
24	FW	ALG	Youcef Benamara
25	MF	ALG	Hocine Laribi
26	FW	ALG	Oualid Ardji
27	MF	ALG	Zakaria Ouhadda
28	FW	ALG	Ashraf Abdelamine Attia
29	MF	GUI	Mohamed Coumbassa
30	GK	ALG	Azzedine Doukha
35	DF	ALG	Abdelghani Bouzidi
39	DF	ALG	Naoufel Khacef

== Transfers ==
=== In ===
No.	Pos.	Nation	Player
30	GK	ALG	Azzedine Doukha (to (Algeria) NA Hussein Dey)
26	MF	ALG	Oualid Ardji (from (Algeria) USM Alger)
6	MF	ALG	Hocine El Orfi (from (Algeria) USM Alger)
24	DF	ALG	Youcef Benamara (from (Algeria) USM Blida)
7	FW	ALG	Saïd Ferguène (from (Algeria) JS Kabylie)
14	MF	ALG	Hocine Harrouche (from (Algeria) JS Kabylie)

No.	Pos.	Nation	Player
13	FW	ALG	Lamine Abid (from (Algeria) USM El Harrach)
—	FW	ALG	Mohamed Noureddine Benai (from (Algeria) USM Bel-Abbès)
23	MF	ALG	Abdelghani Khiat (from (Algeria) DRB Tadjenanet)
19	MF	ALG	Zakaria Benhocine (from (Algeria) ASO Chlef)
25	MF	ALG	Hocine Laribi (from (Algeria) MC Saïda)
16	GK	ALG	Gaya Merbah (from (Algeria) RC Arbaâ)
—	FW	ALG	Mohamed Noureddine Benai (to (Algeria) MC Oran)

=== Out ===
No.	Pos.	Nation	Player
16	GK	ALG	Kheireddine Boussouf (to (Algeria) MC Alger)
—	FW	GAB	Samson Mbingui (to (Morocco) Raja Casablanca)
—	DF	ALG	Ishak Guebli (to (Algeria) RC Relizane)
—	FW	ALG	Mourad Benayad (to (Algeria) RC Relizane)
—	MF	ALG	Aymen Madi (to (Algeria) )
