= 2014–15 NA Hussein Dey season =

NA Hussein Dey
2014–15 season
- Chairman: Mahfoud Ould Zmirli
- Head coach: Meziane Ighil
- Stadium: Stade du 20 Août 1955
- Ligue 1: 9th
- Algerian Cup: Quarter-finals
- Top goalscorer: League: Nouri Ouznadji (7); All: Nouri Ouznadji (7)

In the 2014–15 season, NA Hussein Dey competed in the Ligue 1 for the 39th season, as well as the Algerian Cup.

== Squad list ==
Players and squad numbers last updated on 18 November 2014.
Note: Flags indicate national team as has been defined under FIFA eligibility rules. Players may hold more than one non-FIFA nationality.

Squad No.	Nationality	Position	Name	Date Of Birth (Age)	Moving from
Goalkeepers
1	(Algeria)	GK	Abdelhamid Brahimi	27 May 1992 (aged 21)	Youth system
16	(Algeria)	GK	Mohamed Ghalem	17 October 1977 (aged 36)	(Algeria) ASO Chlef
29	(Algeria)	GK	Mohamed Seddik Mokrani	10 February 1990 (aged 23)	Youth system
Defenders
31	(Algeria)	RB	Slimani Allali	5 August 1991 (aged 22)	Youth system
2	(Algeria)	RB	Abdelkader Besseghir	5 March 1978 (aged 35)	(Algeria) MC Alger
4	(Algeria)	RB	Mohamed Hérida	28 March 1988 (aged 25)	(Algeria) CR Belouizdad
20	(Algeria)	RB	Samir Khiter	5 June 1987 (aged 26)	(Algeria)
14	(Algeria)	RB	Yazid Bessaha	22 February 1991 (aged 22)	Youth system
17	(Algeria)	RB	Ishak Guebli	25 April 1987 (aged 26)	(Algeria) CR Belouizdad
18	(Algeria)	RB	Oussama Khellaf	15 March 1988 (aged 25)	(Algeria)
Midfielders
8	(Algeria)	CM	Chérif Abdeslam	1 September 1978 (aged 35)	(Algeria) ASO Chlef
34	(Algeria)	CM	Sofiane Bendebka	9 August 1992 (aged 21)	Youth system
6	(Algeria)	CM	Rafik Boussaïd	9 March 1988 (aged 25)	(Algeria) ASO Chlef
9	(Algeria)	CM	Aymen Madi	26 December 1988 (aged 25)	(Algeria) JS Kabylie
19	(Algeria)	CM	Hamza Aliouane	30 June 1985 (aged 28)	(Algeria) USM Blida
22	(Algeria)	CM	Salim Boukhenchouche	6 October 1991 (aged 22)	Youth system
15	(Algeria)	CM	Karim Ghazi	6 January 1979 (aged 34)	(Algeria) MC Alger
23	(Algeria)	CM	Hocine Metref	1 January 1984 (aged 30)	(Algeria) MC Alger
Forwards
40	(Algeria)	RW	Zakaria Ahmed Benyahia	13 November 1990 (aged 23)	Youth system
77	(Chad)	RW	Ezechiel Ndouasel	22 April 1988 (aged 25)	(Tunisia) Club Africain
7	(Algeria)	RW	Nouri Ouznadji	30 December 1984 (aged 29)	(Algeria) USM Bel-Abbès
11	(Algeria)	RW	Mourad Benayad	25 September 1990 (aged 23)	(Algeria) JS Saoura
27	(Algeria)	RW	Zakaria Ouhadda	23 February 1986 (aged 27)	(Algeria)
24	(Algeria)	RW	Amine Touahri	12 December 1989 (aged 24)	(Algeria) ES Sétif

== Competitions ==
=== Overview ===
Competition	Record								Started round	Final position / round	First match	Last match
Competition	G	W	D	L	GF	GA	GD	Win %	Started round	Final position / round	First match	Last match
Ligue 1	30	10	10	10	23	22	+1	33.33	—N/a	9th	16 August 2014	29 May 2015
Algerian Cup	4	3	1	0	7	3	+4	75.00	Round of 64	Quarter-finals	13 December 2014	13 March 2015
Total	34	13	11	10	30	25	+5	38.24				

=== Ligue 1 ===
The Ligue 1 2014-2015 is the fifty-first edition of Algerian Ligue Professionnelle 1 and the fifth under the name Ligue 1. Division opposes sixteen clubs in a series of thirty meetings. The best in the league qualify for the African cups that are the Champions League (the podium) and Confederation Cup (the third and the winner national cup).

The relegated the previous season, JSM Bejaia on CA Bordj Bou Arreridj and CRB Ain Fakroun are replaced by USM Bel-Abbès, Ligue 2 in 2013-2014 after a year's absence, the ASM Oran, 7 years after his last appearance at the highest national level, and NA Hussein Dey relegated to Ligue 2 during the 2010–2011 season.

==== League table ====
Pos	Team	Pld	W	D	L	GF	GA	GD	Pts
7	ASM Oran	30	11	8	11	33	37	−4	41 (Note: USMA 1-2 ASMO; ASMO 1-0 USMA)
8	USM Alger	30	10	11	9	35	27	+8	41
9	NA Hussein Dey	30	10	10	10	23	22	+1	40 (Note: NAHD 3-0 RCA; RCA 0-1 NAHD)
10	RC Arbaâ	30	12	4	14	28	35	−7	40
11	JS Saoura	30	10	9	11	26	29	−3	39 (Note: JSS: 9 points; MCA: 6 points; JSK: 3 points)

Updated to match(es) played on 29 May 2015. Source: DZFoot
Rules for classification: 1) points; 2) head-to-head points; 3) head-to-head goal difference; 4) goal difference; 5) total goals; 6) fairplay ranking; 7) playoff

==== Results summary ====
Overall								Home						Away					
Pld	W	D	L	GF	GA	GD	Pts	W	D	L	GF	GA	GD	W	D	L	GF	GA	GD
30	10	10	10	23	22	+1	40	8	3	4	16	10	+6	2	7	6	7	12	−5

Last updated: 29 December 2014.
Source: Competitive matches

==== Results by round ====
Round	1	2	3	4	5	6	7	8	9	10	11	12	13	14	15	16	17	18	19	20	21	22	23	24	25	26	27	28	29	30
Ground	H	A	H	A	H	A	H	A	H	A	H	A	H	H	A	A	H	A	H	A	H	A	H	A	H	A	H	A	A	H
Result	L	L	D	D	L	L	W	D	W	L	W	D	L	W	L	D	W	L	D	L	W	D	D	D	L	W	W	W	D	W
Position	15	15	16	16	16	16	16	16	16	16	14	13	15	14	14	13	13	14	14	15	14	13	15	16	16	16	15	12	12	9

Updated to match(es) played on 29 December 2014. Source: Competitive matches
A = Away; H = Home; W = Win; D = Draw; L = Loss

==== Matches ====
16 August 2014 1	NA Hussein Dey	0–2	MO Béjaïa	Algiers
17:00		Report	23', 33' Ballo	Stadium: Stade Omar Hammadi; Referee: Mohamed Bichari

23 August 2014 2	ASM Oran	2–1	NA Hussein Dey	Oran
19:00	Bentiba 6'; Aouad 38'	Report	90+4' (pen.) Ahmed Benyahia	Stadium: Stade Ahmed Zabana; Referee: Abderrezzak Arab

12 September 2014 3	NA Hussein Dey	1–1	MC Alger	Belouizdad
17:45	Ouznadji 81'	Report	5' (pen.) Gourmi	Stadium: Stade 20 Août 1955; Referee: Lyés Bekouassa

16 September 2014 4	ES Sétif	1–1	NA Hussein Dey	Sétif
20:00	Benyettou 55'	Report	63' (pen.) Ouznadji	Stadium: Stade 8 Mai 1945; Referee: Mohamed Ghorbal

26 September 2014 5	NA Hussein Dey	1–2	JS Kabylie	Belouizdad
17:45	Deugoué 90+3'	Report	60' Aiboud; 76' Ferrahi	Stadium: Stade 20 Août 1955; Referee: Said Aouina

11 October 2014 6	MC Oran	1–0	NA Hussein Dey	Oran
19:00	Za'abia 73'	Report		Stadium: Stade Ahmed Zabana; Referee: Hakim Bouchama

17 October 2014 7	NA Hussein Dey	1–0	CR Belouizdad	Algiers
18:00	Ouznadji 77'	Report		Stadium: Stade Omar Hammadi; Referee: Farouk Houasnia

24 October 2014 8	USM Alger	0–0	NA Hussein Dey	Algiers
17:00		Report		Stadium: Stade Omar Hammadi; Referee: Mustapha Bessiri

31 October 2014 9	NA Hussein Dey	2–0	CS Constantine	Belouizdad
16:00	Ouznadji 54', 83'	Report		Stadium: Stade 20 Août 1955; Referee: Mohamed Boukhalfa

8 November 2014 10	MC El Eulma	2–0	NA Hussein Dey	El Eulma
18:00	Derrardja 40'; Chenihi 59'	Report		Stadium: Stade Messaoud Zougar; Referee: Chebana, Allaoua, Benbraham

22 November 2014 11	NA Hussein Dey	3–0	RC Arbaâ	Belouizdad
16:00	Ahmed Benyahia 3'; Benayad 69'; Ouznadji 89'	Report		Stadium: Stade 20 Août 1955; Referee: Abderrezzak Arab

29 November 2014 12	USM Bel-Abbès	0–0	NA Hussein Dey	Sidi Bel Abbès
16:00		Report		Stadium: Stade 24 Fevrier 1956; Referee: Redouane Necib

19 December 2014 13	NA Hussein Dey	1–2	USM El Harrach	Belouizdad
16:00	Metref 25' (pen.)	Report	12' Boumechra; 65' (pen.) Abid	Stadium: Stade 20 Août 1955; Referee: Mehdi Abid Charef

19 December 2014 14	NA Hussein Dey	1–0	ASO Chlef	Belouizdad
16:00	Metref 90+2'	Report		Stadium: Stade 20 Août 1955; Referee: Bachit, Hadj Said, Abid

30 December 2014 15	JS Saoura	1–0	NA Hussein Dey	Béchar
14:30	Sayah 58' (pen.)	Report		Stadium: Stade 20 Août 1955; Referee: Said Aouina

20 January 2015 16	MO Béjaïa	0–0	NA Hussein Dey	Béjaïa
17:00		Report		Stadium: Stade de l'Unité Maghrébine; Referee: Mohamed Boukhalfa

24 January 2015 17	NA Hussein Dey	2–1	ASM Oran	Belouizdad
16:00	Ahmed Benyahia 13'; Benayad 53'	Report	82' Djemaouni	Stadium: Stade 20 Août 1955; Referee: Boubekeur Zouaoui

31 January 2015 18	MC Alger	1–0	NA Hussein Dey	Algiers
16:00	Hachoud 41'	Report		Stadium: Stade Omar Hammadi; Referee: Farouk Houasnia

6 February 2015 19	NA Hussein Dey	0–0	ES Setif	Belouizdad
16:00		Report		Stadium: Stade 20 Août 1955; Referee: Mustapha Bessiri

13 February 2015 20	JS Kabylie	1–0	NA Hussein Dey	Sétif
16:00	Ziti 49'	Report		Stadium: Stade 8 Mai 1945; Attendance: 0 (close doors); Referee: Mehdi Abid Charef

28 February 2015 21	NA Hussein Dey	1–0	MC Oran	Belouizdad
16:00	Ouhadda 44'	Report		Stadium: Stade 20 Août 1955; Referee: Lahlou Benbraham

6 March 2015 22	CR Belouizdad	0–0	NA Hussein Dey	Belouizdad
16:00		Report		Stadium: Stade 20 Août 1955; Referee: Mohamed Bichari

21 March 2015 23	NA Hussein Dey	0–0	USM Alger	Belouizdad
16:00		Report		Stadium: Stade 20 Août 1955; Referee: Mohamed Benouza

10 April 2015 24	CS Constantine	2–2	NA Hussein Dey	Constantine
16:00	Boucherit 30'; Messadia 40'	Report	11' Ouhadda; 88' Ndouasel	Stadium: Stade Mohamed Hamlaoui; Referee: Mohamed Boukhalfa

14 April 2015 25	NA Hussein Dey	1–2	MC El Eulma	Belouizdad
17:00	Benayad 86'	Report	37' Hammami; 75' Kara	Stadium: Stade 20 Août 1955; Referee: Mehdi Abid Charef

25 April 2015 26	RC Arbaâ	0–1	NA Hussein Dey	Larbaâ
17:00		Report	29' Benayad	Stadium: Stade Ismaïl Makhlouf; Attendance: 0 (close doors); Referee: Lyés Bekouassa

9 May 2015 27	NA Hussein Dey	1–0	USM Bel-Abbès	Belouizdad
17:00	Boukhenchouche 72' (pen.)	Report		Stadium: Stade 20 Août 1955; Referee: Said Aouina

16 May 2015 28	USM El Harrach	1–2	NA Hussein Dey	El Harrach
17:00	Amada 49' (pen.)	Report	25' (pen.) Bendebka; 59' Madi	Stadium: Stade 1er Novembre 1954; Referee: Mohamed Bichari

23 May 2015 29	ASO Chlef	0–0	NA Hussein Dey	Chlef
17:00		Report		Stadium: Stade Mohamed Boumezrag; Referee: Abderrezzak Arab

29 May 2015 30	NA Hussein Dey	1–0	JS Saoura	Belouizdad
17:00	Khellaf 60'	Report		Stadium: Stade 20 Août 1955; Referee: Mehdi Abid Charef

== Algerian Cup ==
12 December 2014 Round of 64	NA Hussein Dey	2–1	AS Marsa	Belouizdad
16:00	Mourad Benayad 57', 75'	Repport	46' Tchamba	Stadium: Stade 20 Août 1955; Referee: Rahmine, Benaissa, Kechida

27 December 2014 Round of 32	NA Hussein Dey	2–0	USM Cheraga	Belouizdad
14:00	Madi 20'; Ouhadda 90+4'	Repport		Stadium: Stade 20 Août 1955; Referee: Merzak Halalchi

21 February 2015 Round of 16	NA Hussein Dey	2–1 (a.e.t.)	DRB Tadjenanet	Belouizdad
15:00	Guebli 13' (pen.); Ndouasel 109'	Repport	41' Benaldjia	Stadium: Stade 20 Août 1955; Referee: Lahlou Benbraham

13 March 2015 Quarter-finals	NA Hussein Dey	1–1 (a.e.t.) (1–3 p)	RC Arbaâ	Belouizdad
16:00	Ndouassel 81'	Repport	Zeddam 90+4'	Stadium: Stade 20 Août 1955; Referee: Redouane Necib
	Penalties
	Metref (penalty scored); Boukhenchouche (penalty missed); Bendebka (penalty missed)		(penalty scored) Mokdad; (penalty scored) Seddiki; (penalty missed) Darfalou; (penalty scored) El Moudene

== Squad information ==
=== Goalscorers ===
Includes all competitive matches. The list is sorted alphabetically by surname when total goals are equal.

No.	Nat.	Player	Pos.	Ligue 1	Cup	TOTAL
7	(Algeria)	Nouri Ouznadji	FW	7	0	7
11	(Algeria)	Mourad Benayad	FW	3	2	5
40	(Algeria)	Zakaria Ahmed Benyahia	FW	3	0	3
27	(Algeria)	Zakaria Ouhadda	FW	2	1	3
77	(Chad)	Ezechiel Ndouasel	FW	1	2	3
23	(Algeria)	Hocine Metref	MF	2	0	2
9	(Algeria)	Aymen Madi	MF	1	1	2
34	(Algeria)	Sofiane Bendebka	MF	1	0	1
22	(Algeria)	Salim Boukhenchouche	MF	1	0	1
17	(Algeria)	Ishak Guebli	DF	0	1	1
-	(Cameroon)	Christian Deugoué	FW	1	0	1
18	(Algeria)	Oussama Khellaf	DF	1	0	1
Own Goals				0	0	0
Totals				23	7	30
