= 2011–12 NA Hussein Dey season =

NA Hussein Dey
2011–12 season
- Chairman: Mahfoud Ould Zmirli
- Head coach: Saïd Hamouche (until 1 January 2012); Chaâbane Merzekane (from 15 January 2012)
- Stadium: Stade du 20 Août 1955
- Ligue 1: 15th
- Algerian Cup: Round of 64
- Top goalscorer: League: Walid Derrardja (7); All: Walid Derrardja (7)

In the 2011–12 season, NA Hussein Dey is competing in the Ligue 1 for the 38th season, as well as the Algerian Cup. They will be competing in Ligue 1, and the Algerian Cup.

== Squad list ==
Players and squad numbers last updated on 18 November 2011.
Note: Flags indicate national team as has been defined under FIFA eligibility rules. Players may hold more than one non-FIFA nationality.

No.	Nat.	Position	Name	Date of birth (age)	Signed from
Goalkeepers
Defenders
Midfielders
Forwards

== Competitions ==
=== Overview ===
Competition	Record								Started round	Final position / round	First match	Last match
Competition	G	W	D	L	GF	GA	GD	Win %	Started round	Final position / round	First match	Last match
Ligue 1	30	5	11	14	29	39	−10	16.67	—N/a	15th	10 September 2011	19 May 2012
Algerian Cup	1	0	0	1	0	1	−1	0.00	Round of 64		30 December 2011	
Total	31	5	11	15	29	40	−11	16.13				

Updated to match played 3 June 2019
Source: Competitions

== League table ==
Pos	Team	Pld	W	D	L	GF	GA	GD	Pts	Qualification or relegation
12	CS Constantine	30	8	12	10	35	42	−7	36	
13	MC Oran	30	9	8	13	38	51	−13	35	
14	AS Khroub (R)	30	7	10	13	23	46	−23	31	Relegation to Ligue Professionnelle 2
15	NA Hussein Dey (R)	30	5	11	14	29	39	−10	26	Relegation to Ligue Professionnelle 2
16	MC Saïda (R)	30	6	6	18	28	46	−18	24	Relegation to Ligue Professionnelle 2

Updated to match(es) played on 19 April 2018. Source: DZFoot
Rules for classification: 1) points; 2) head-to-head points; 3) head-to-head goal difference; 4) goal difference; 5) total goals; 6) fairplay ranking; 7) playoff.
(R) Relegated

=== Results summary ===
Overall								Home						Away					
Pld	W	D	L	GF	GA	GD	Pts	W	D	L	GF	GA	GD	W	D	L	GF	GA	GD
30	5	11	14	29	39	−10	26	5	6	4	19	14	+5	0	5	10	10	25	−15

Last updated: 22 April 2018.
Source: Competitive matches

=== Results by round ===
Round	1	2	3	4	5	6	7	8	9	10	11	12	13	14	15	16	17	18	19	20	21	22	23	24	25	26	27	28	29	30
Ground																														
Result																														
Position																														

Source: Competitive matches
A = Away; H = Home; W = Win; D = Draw; L = Loss

=== Matches ===
Win Draw Loss

10 September 2011 Round 1	ES Sétif	3–2	NA Hussein Dey	Sétif
20:00	Hachoud 12', 90'; Aoudia 59'	Report	Saïbi 49'; Derrardja 80'	Stadium: Stade 8 Mai 1945; Referee: Mohamed Amine Ghorbal

17 September 2011 Round 2	JSM Béjaïa	1–0	NA Hussein Dey	Béjaïa
19:00	Yabeun 69'	Report		Stadium: Stade de l'Unité Maghrébine; Referee: Farid Bahloul

24 September 2011 Round 3	NA Hussein Dey	1–1	ASO Chlef	Belouizdad
18:00	Souakir 45'	Report	Messaoud 35' (pen.)	Stadium: Stade 20 Août 1955; Referee: Mokhtar Amalou

1 October 2011 Round 4	MC Alger	1–1	NA Hussein Dey	Algiers
18:00	Sayah 77'	Report	Souakir 90+5'	Stadium: Stade 5 Juillet 1962; Referee: Farouk Houasnia

15 October 2011 Round 5	NA Hussein Dey	1–2	CA Batna	Hussein Dey
18:00	El Okbi 25'	Report	Daira 40'; Messadia 83'	Stadium: Zioui Brothers Stadium; Referee: Mohamed Babou

22 October 2011 Round 6	USM El Harrach	1–0	NA Hussein Dey	Algiers
18:00	Yachir 88'	Report		Stadium: Stade 1er Novembre 1954; Referee: Mohamed Benouza

29 October 2011 Round 7	NA Hussein Dey	1–2	CR Belouizdad	Algiers
19:00	Saïbi 64'	Report	Rebih 15'; Slimani 57'	Stadium: Stade 5 Juillet 1962; Referee: Djamel Haimoudi

4 November 2011 Round 8	MC El Eulma	4–0	NA Hussein Dey	El Eulma
15:00	Belakhdar 9'; Bouaïcha 45+1', 66', 73'	Report		Stadium: Stade Messaoud Zougar; Referee: Mohamed Sahraoui

19 November 2011 Round 9	NA Hussein Dey	1–1	AS Khroub	Hussein Dey
18:00	El Okbi 70'	Report	Benamokrane 29'	Stadium: Zioui Brothers Stadium; Referee: Bouaza Chenane

22 November 2011 Round 10	WA Tlemcen	0–0	NA Hussein Dey	Tlemcen
17:00		Report		Stadium: Stade Akid Lotfi; Referee: Boubekeur Zouaoui

26 November 2011 Round 11	NA Hussein Dey	0–0	MC Oran	Hussein Dey
15:00		Report		Stadium: Zioui Brothers Stadium; Referee: Redouane Necib

3 December 2011 Round 12	USM Alger	2–0	NA Hussein Dey	Algiers
14:30	Daham 73', 83' (pen.)	Report		Stadium: Stade 5 Juillet 1962; Referee: Mohamed Benouza

10 December 2011 Round 13	NA Hussein Dey	0–0	JS Kabylie	Hussein Dey
15:00		Report		Stadium: Zioui Brothers Stadium; Referee: Mehdi Abid Charef

17 December 2011 Round 14	MC Saïda	1–1	NA Hussein Dey	Saida
15:00	Saâdi 40'	Report	El Okbi 47'	Stadium: April 13, 1958 Stadium; Referee: Said Aouina

24 December 2011 Round 15	NA Hussein Dey	0–0	CS Constantine	Hussein Dey
15:00		Report		Stadium: Zioui Brothers Stadium; Referee: Mohamed Sahraoui

21 January 2012 Round 16	NA Hussein Dey	1–2	ES Sétif	Hussein Dey
15:00	Khedis 90' (pen.)	Report	Aoudia 4', 8'	Stadium: Zioui Brothers Stadium; Referee: Farouk Houasnia

28 January 2012 Round 17	NA Hussein Dey	1–0	JSM Béjaïa	Hussein Dey
15:00	Merbah 75'	Report		Stadium: Zioui Brothers Stadium; Referee: Boubekeur Zouaoui

31 January 2012 Round 18	ASO Chlef	2–1	NA Hussein Dey	Chlef
17:45	Gharbi 45+2'; Seguer 49'	Report	Zenou 68'	Stadium: Stade Mohamed Boumezrag; Referee: Redouane Necib

28 February 2012 Round 19	NA Hussein Dey	2–2	MC Alger	Algiers
17:45	Derrardja 14'; Allag 23'	Report	Babouche 19'; Sayah 66' (pen.)	Stadium: Stade 5 Juillet 1962; Referee: Mohamed Benouza

18 February 2012 Round 20	CA Batna	0–0	NA Hussein Dey	Batna
17:45		Report		Stadium: Mustapha Seffouhi Stadium; Referee: Farouk Mial

3 March 2012 Round 21	NA Hussein Dey	2–0	USM El Harrach	Hussein Dey
15:00	Zenou 6'; Boussaïd 65'	Report		Stadium: Zioui Brothers Stadium; Referee: Sofiane Bousseter

17 March 2012 Round 22	CR Belouizdad	1–0	NA Hussein Dey	Algiers
17:45	Slimani 30'	Report		Stadium: Stade 5 Juillet 1962; Referee: Mohamed Bachir

24 March 2012 Round 23	NA Hussein Dey	3–1	MC El Eulma	Hussein Dey
15:00	Ouhadda 43'; Zenou 61'; Derrardja 72'	Report	Belakhdar 19'	Stadium: Zioui Brothers Stadium; Referee: Youssef Zerrouki

7 April 2012 Round 24	AS Khroub	2–1	NA Hussein Dey	El Khroub
16:00	Boukhiar 35'; Benamokrane 86'	Report	Ouhadda 29'	Stadium: Abed Hamdani Stadium; Referee: Mohamed Saïdi

14 April 2012 Round 25	NA Hussein Dey	2–1	WA Tlemcen	Hussein Dey
15:00	Allag 6'; Bendebka 38'	Report	Bourahli 44'	Stadium: Zioui Brothers Stadium; Referee: Farid Bahloul

28 April 2012 Round 26	MC Oran	1–0	NA Hussein Dey	Oran
15:00	Sandaogo 85'	Report		Stadium: Stade Ahmed Zabana; Referee: Rafik Achouri

8 May 2012 Round 27	NA Hussein Dey	1–2	USM Alger	Algiers
16:00	Derrardja 11'	Report	38' Djediat; 90+5' Bouchema	Stadium: Stade 5 Juillet 1962; Referee: Redouane Necib

12 May 2012 Round 28	JS Kabylie	3–1	NA Hussein Dey	Tizi Ouzou
17:00	Hemani 18'; Hanifi 63'; Boulemdaïs 83'	Report	Zenou 44'	Stadium: Stade du 1er Novembre 1954; Referee: Boubekeur Zouaoui

15 May 2012 Round 29	NA Hussein Dey	3–0	MC Saïda	Hussein Dey
18:00	Derrardja 61', 80'; Boussaïd 81'	Report		Stadium: Zioui Brothers Stadium; Referee: Mokhtar Amalou

19 May 2012 Round 30	CS Constantine	3–3	NA Hussein Dey	Constantine
15:00	Bouguerra 34', 44'; Eguakun 77'	Report	Derrardja 9'; Lahlou 13'; Ouhadda 31'	Stadium: Stade Mohamed Hamlaoui; Referee: Mohamed Saïdi

== Algerian Cup ==
30 December 2011 Round of 64	AS Khroub	1–0	NA Hussein Dey	El Khroub
14:30	Mesfar 41'	Report		Stadium: Abed Hamdani Stadium; Referee: Ghorbal, Meknous, Cherchar

== Squad information ==
=== Playing statistics ===
No.	Pos	Nat	Player	Total		Ligue 1		Algerian Cup	
No.	Pos	Nat	Player	Apps	Goals	Apps	Goals	Apps	Goals
Goalkeepers
1	GK	(Algeria) ALG	Abderaouf Natèche	14	0	13	0	1	0
28	GK	(Algeria) ALG	Nadjib Ghoul	14	0	14	0	0	0
30	GK	(Algeria) ALG	Abderaouf Belhani	3	0	3	0	0	0
Defenders
19	DF	(Algeria) ALG	Imad Eddine Mellouli	22	0	21	0	1	0
5	DF	(Algeria) ALG	Sid Ahmed Khedis	15	1	15	1	0	0
18	DF	(Algeria) ALG	Sofiane Abbès	25	0	24	0	1	0
	DF	(Algeria) ALG	Lamine Zemmouri	1	0	1	0	0	0
	DF	(Algeria) ALG	Nassim Oussalah	2	0	2	0	0	0
22	DF	(Algeria) ALG	Djamel Benlamri	18	0	18	0	0	0
20	DF	(Algeria) ALG	Samir Khiter	20	0	19	0	1	0
4	DF	(Algeria) ALG	Abdelmalek Merbah	20	1	19	1	1	0
33	DF	(Algeria) ALG	Yazid Bessaha	10	0	9	0	1	0
	DF	(Algeria) ALG	Mehdi Mahloul	1	0	1	0	0	0
	DF	(Algeria) ALG	Zakaria Kedideh	1	0	1	0	0	0
Midfielders
15	MF	(Algeria) ALG	Fouad Allag	25	2	24	2	1	0
2	MF	(Niger) NIG	Jimmy Bulus	3	0	3	0	0	0
7	MF	(Algeria) ALG	Aymen Madi	17	0	16	0	1	0
6	MF	(Algeria) ALG	Rafik Boussaïd	2	0	1	0	1	0
8	MF	(Algeria) ALG	Hocine Harrouche	10	0	10	0	0	0
46	MF	(Mali) MLI	Amadou Diamouténé	3	0	3	0	0	0
10	MF	(Algeria) ALG	Hacène El Okbi	15	3	15	3	0	0
26	MF	(Algeria) ALG	Abdelhakim Touati	13	0	13	0	0	0
32	MF	(Algeria) ALG	Hichem Yahiaoui	3	0	3	0	0	0
37	MF	(Algeria) ALG	Sofiane Bendebka	11	1	10	1	1	0
	MF	(Algeria) ALG	Amine Fettal	1	0	1	0	0	0
	MF	(Algeria) ALG	Mourad Zerrouki	2	0	2	0	0	0
Forwards
45	FW	(Cameroon) CMR	Paul Emile Biyaga	9	0	9	0	0	0
17	FW	(Algeria) ALG	Walid Derrardja	27	7	27	7	0	0
9	FW	(Algeria) ALG	Rabah Hafid	5	0	5	0	0	0
23	FW	(Algeria) ALG	Youcef Saïbi	7	2	7	2	0	0
31	FW	(Algeria) ALG	Adlène Bensaïd	4	0	4	0	0	0
27	FW	(Algeria) ALG	Hichem Souakir	11	2	11	2	0	0
40	FW	(Algeria) ALG	Zakaria Ahmed Benyahia	19	0	18	0	1	0
	FW	(Algeria) ALG	Ghilas Aït Ali	5	0	5	0	0	0
	FW	(Algeria) ALG	Merouane Abbes Benmoulay	3	0	2	0	1	0
43	FW	(Algeria) ALG	Samir Zenou	14	4	14	4	0	0
44	FW	(Algeria) ALG	Zakaria Ouhadda	9	3	9	3	0	0
	FW	(Algeria) ALG	Zemiti	1	0	1	0	0	0
Players transferred out during the season

Last updated: 25 November 2017
Source: fr.soccerway.com

== Transfers ==
=== In ===
Date	Pos	Player	from club	Transfer fee	Source
1 July 2011	DF	(Algeria) Abdelmalek Merbah	USM Alger	Free transfer	
1 July 2011	DF	(Algeria) Sid Ahmed Khedis	RC Kouba	Free transfer	
1 July 2011	DF	(Algeria) Sofiane Abbès	RC Kouba	Free transfer	
1 July 2011	MF	(Niger) Jimmy Bulus	(Burkina Faso) ASFA Yennenga	Free transfer	
1 July 2011	MF	(Algeria) Sofiane Bendebka	NA Hussein Dey U21	First Professional Contract	
15 July 2011	MF	(Algeria) Hocine Harrouche	Paradou AC	Free transfer	
15 July 2011	FW	(Algeria) Zakaria Ahmed Benyahia	RC Kouba	Free transfer	
15 July 2011	FW	(Algeria) Hichem Souakir	AS Khroub	Free transfer	
26 July 2011	MF	(Algeria) Aymen Madi	RC Kouba	Free transfer	
7 August 2011	GK	(Algeria) Nadjib Ghoul	CR Belouizdad	Free transfer	
12 August 2011	FW	(Algeria) Youcef Saïbi	CR Belouizdad	Free transfer	
13 August 2011	FW	(Algeria) Adlène Bensaïd	CA Bordj Bou Arreridj	Free transfer	
1 January 2012	FW	(Cameroon) Paul Emile Biyaga	ASO Chlef	Free transfer	
1 January 2012	MF	(Mali) Amadou Diamouténé	USM Alger	Leon	
7 January 2012	DF	(Algeria) Nassim Oussalah	CA Batna	Free transfer	
31 January 2011	GK	(Algeria) Abderaouf Belhani	RC Kouba	Free transfer	

=== Out ===
Date	Pos	Player	To club	Transfer fee	Source
24 July 2011	MF	(Algeria) Kaci Sedkaoui	JS Kabylie	Free transfer	
