= List of NA Hussein Dey seasons =

Nasr Athlétique de Hussein Dey is an Algerian professional football club based in Algiers, Algiers Province. The club was formed in the Léveilley district (El Magharia currently) in the Café de Ali Kaddour, at number 45 in 1947 as Nasr Athlétique de Hussein Dey .

== Seasons ==
Season	League									Cup	Other	Africa		Top goalscorer(s) (Note: Goals in all competitions (Algerian Ligue Professionnelle 1, Algerian Cup, League Cup, African and Super Cup) are counted.)		Ref.
Season	Division	Pos	Pts	P	W	D	L	GF	GA	Cup	Other	Africa		Name	Goals	Ref.
1962–63	Critérium Honneur	1st	50	18	16	0	2	60	15	R32						
1963–64	Division Honneur	1st	75	30	19	7	4	72	29	R16				Hocine Saâdi	39	
1964–65	National	4th	64	30	13	8	9	38	33	QF				Hocine Saâdi	25	
1965–66	National	8th	59	30	10	9	11	46	40	R32						
1966–67	National	1st	51	22	12	5	5	34	21	QF						
1967–68	National	4th	47	22	9	7	6	37	28	RU				Aouar	12	
1968–69	National	9th	42	22	7	6	9	28	36	SF						
1969–70	National I	8th	41	22	6	7	9	23	26	R32						
1970–71	National I	4th	46	22	9	6	7	24	20	R32						
1971–72	National I	8th	59	30	11	7	12	31	20	SF				Salhi	9	
1972–73	National I	2nd	68	30	12	14	4	36	25	QF						
1973–74	National I	3rd	66	30	14	8	8	45	31	SF						
1974–75	National I	4th	63	30	12	10	8	42	29	QF						
1975–76	National I	2nd	72	30	18	6	6	43	20	QF						
1976–77	National I	3rd	62	26	16	5	5	60	26	RU						
1977–78	Division 1	4th	56	26	9	12	5	35	31	QF		Cup Winners' Cup	RU			
1978–79	Division 1	9th	50	26	7	10	9	29	27	W						
1979–80	Division 1	3rd	64	30	12	10	8	45	27	QF		Cup Winners' Cup	SF			
1980–81	Division 1	6th	58	29	12	6	11	36	35	R16						
1981–82	Division 1	2nd	69	30	15	9	6	41	21	RU						
1982–83	Division 1	10th	58	30	11	8	11	32	31	R64						
1983–84	Division 1	15th	57	30	8	11	11	32	27	R32						
1984–85	Division 1	4th	82	38	17	10	11	43	35	R64						
1985–86	Division 1	18th	72	38	12	10	16	28	26	R64						
1986–87	Division 2	7th	32	31	11	10	10	44	26	RT						
1987–88	Division 2	8th	39	34	14	11	9	43	30	R64						
1988–89	Régional									R64						
1989–90	Régional	1st	45	30	17	11	2	40	14	NP						
1990–91	Division 2	1st	39	30	15	9	6	29	13	R64						
1991–92	Division 1	4th	35	30	12	11	7	25	17	SF						
1992–93	Division 1	2nd	37	30	13	11	6	34	21	NP						
1993–94	Division 1	12th	29	30	11	7	12	23	24	R32		Cup Winners' Cup	Second round			
1994–95	Division 1	15th	25	30	8	9	13	33	48	R32						
1995–96	Division 2	1st	61	30	18	7	5	40	18	R64						
1996–97	Division 1	15th	33	30	9	7	14	38	44							
1997–98	Division 2	1st	61	30	18	7	5	46	15							
1998–99	Division 1	10th	33	26	9	6	11	19	23							
1999–00	Division 2	12th	30	26	9	3	14	28	36							
2000–01	Division 2	3rd	52	30	15	7	8	49	33							
2001–02	Division 2	1st	65	30	19	8	1	42	15							
2002–03	Division 1	3rd	51	30	13	12	5	32	24							
2003–04	Division 1	3rd	49	30	13	10	7	31	19							
2004–05	Division 1	4th	43	30	11	10	9	29	19							
2005–06	Division 1	11th	38	30	10	8	12	27	35	QF		Confederation Cup	Play-off round			
2006–07	Division 1	7th	41	30	11	8	11	27	33	R32				Ibrahima Camara	6	
2007–08	Division 1	11th	38	30	10	8	12	35	38	SF				Nouri Ouznadji	8	
2008–09	Division 1	13th	39	32	10	9	13	28	35	R64						
2009–10	Division 1	18th	19	34	3	10	21	22	49	R32						
2010–11	Ligue 2	2nd	52	30	14	10	6	37	19	R32						
2011–12	Ligue 1	15th	26	30	5	11	14	29	39	R64				Walid Derrardja	7	
2012–13	Ligue 2	7th	43	30	11	10	9	38	21	QF						
2013–14	Ligue 2	2nd	53	30	14	11	5	29	18	R64				Nabil Hemani	7	
2014–15	Ligue 1	9th	40	30	10	10	10	23	22	QF				Nouri Ouznadji	7	
2015–16	Ligue 1	11th	40	30	10	10	10	31	35	RU				Ahmed Gasmi	13	
2016–17	Ligue 1	8th	40	30	11	7	12	38	37	QF				Ahmed Gasmi	15	
2017–18	Ligue 1	3rd	49	30	11	16	3	36	24	R64				Ahmed Gasmi	6	
2018–19	Ligue 1	11th	36	30	9	9	12	22	29	QF		Confederation Cup	Group stage	Ahmed Gasmi	8	
2019–20	Ligue 1 (Note: On March 15, 2020, the Ligue de Football Professionnel (LFP) decided to halt the season due to the COVID-19 pandemic in Algeria. On July 29, 2020, the LFP declared that season is over and CR Belouizdad to be the champion, the promotion of four teams from the League 2, and scrapping the relegation for the current season.)	15th	19	22	4	7	11	14	27	R32				Redouane Zerdoum	5	
2020–21	Ligue 1	12nd	47	38	11	14	13	46	45	NP	R16			Nadji, Meftah	16	
2021–22	Ligue 1	16th	22	34	5	7	22	33	66							
2022–23	Ligue 2	9th	36	30	8	12	10	40	37							
2023–24	Ligue 2	9th	38	30	11	6	13	24	30							
2024–25	Ligue 2															

== Key ==
Key to league record:

- P = Played
- W = Games won
- D = Games drawn
- L = Games lost
- GF = Goals for
- GA = Goals against
- Pts = Points
- Pos = Final position

Key to divisions:

- 1 = Ligue 1
- 2 = Ligue 2

Key to rounds:

- DNE = Did not enter
- Grp = Group stage
- R1 = First Round
- R2 = Second Round
- R32 = R32
- R16 = R16
- QF = QF
- SF = SF
- RU = Runners-up
- W = Winners

Champions	Runners-up	Promoted	Relegated

Division shown in bold to indicate a change in division.
Top scorers shown in bold are players who were also top scorers in their division that season.
