= 2020–21 NA Hussein Dey season =

NA Hussein Dey
2020–21 season
- President: Mahfoud Ould Zmirli
- Head coach: Nabil Leknaoui (from 25 August 2020) (until 1 January 2021); Billel Dziri (from 18 January 2021) (until 18 May 2021)
- Stadium: Stade 20 Août 1955
- Ligue 1: Pre-season
- League Cup: Round of 16
- Highest home attendance: 0 (Note: no one can attend games due to the COVID-19 pandemic)
- Lowest home attendance: 0 (Note: no one can attend games due to the COVID-19 pandemic)
- Average home league attendance: 0 (Note: no one can attend games due to the COVID-19 pandemic)

In the 2020–21 season, NA Hussein Dey is competing in the Ligue 1 for the 45th season, as well as the Algerian Cup. It is their 7th consecutive season in the top flight of Algerian football. They competing in Ligue 1.

== Squad list ==
Players and squad numbers last updated on 15 November 2020.
Note: Flags indicate national team as has been defined under FIFA eligibility rules. Players may hold more than one non-FIFA nationality.

| No. | Nat. | Position | Name | Date of Birth (Age) | Signed from |
Goalkeepers
| 1 | (Algeria) | GK | Wassim Mimoune | 30 August 1999 (aged 21) | (Algeria) Youth system |
| 16 | (Algeria) | GK | Imad Benchlef | 12 October 1993 (aged 27) | (Algeria) Unknown |
| 27 | (Algeria) | GK | Mohamed Seddik Mokrani | 10 February 1990 (aged 30) | (Algeria) DRB Tadjenanet |
Defenders
| 3 | (Algeria) | LB | Mehdi Ferrahi | 22 January 1997 (aged 23) | (Algeria) RC Kouba |
| 4 | (Algeria) | CB | Imadeddine Azzi | 21 June 1998 (aged 22) | (Algeria) MC Alger U21 |
| 13 | (Algeria) | LB | Farès Aggoun | 7 May 1990 (aged 30) | (Algeria) CA Bordj Bou Arreridj |
| 15 | (Algeria) | CB | Zine El-Abidine Sebbah | 22 March 1987 (aged 33) | (Algeria) MC Oran |
| 17 | (Algeria) | CB | Aymen Boucheriha | 30 July 1998 (aged 22) | (Algeria) CS Constantine |
| 21 | (Algeria) | CB | Kousseila Temericht | 24 June 1998 (aged 22) | (Algeria) MO Béjaïa |
| 22 | (Algeria) | RB | Mohamed Rabie Meftah | 5 May 1985 (aged 35) | (Algeria) USM Alger |
| 24 | (Algeria) | CB | Ishak Guebli | 25 April 1987 (aged 33) | (Algeria) US Biskra |
| 26 | (Algeria) | RB | Merouane Boussalem | 11 February 1996 (aged 24) | (Algeria) MO Béjaïa |
Midfielders
| 5 | (Algeria) | AM | Ibrahim Si Ammar | 29 November 1987 (aged 33) | (Algeria) AS Ain M'lila |
| 6 | (Algeria) | DM | Hocine El Orfi | 27 January 1987 (aged 33) | (Saudi Arabia) Al-Mujazzal |
| 8 | (Algeria) | DM | Ilyes Sidhoum | 10 August 1989 (aged 31) | (Algeria) ES Setif |
| 10 | (Algeria) | AM | Faouzi Yaya | 21 September 1989 (aged 31) | (Algeria) USM Alger |
| 12 | (Algeria) | | Abdallah Nacef | 17 October 1999 (aged 21) | (Algeria) Youth system |
| 18 | (Algeria) | DM | Salim Bennai | 25 March 1997 (aged 23) | (Algeria) US Biskra |
| 20 | (Algeria) | DM | Laid Ouaji | 17 April 1998 (aged 22) | (Algeria) USM El Harrach |
| 23 | (Algeria) | CM | Mounir Ait El Hadi | 18 August 1994 (aged 26) | (Algeria) JS Hai El Djabel |
| 25 | (Algeria) | | Islam Bouloudène | 31 May 1995 (aged 25) | (Algeria) A Bou Saâda |
Forwards
| 7 | (Algeria) | | Mohamed Reda Betrouni | 19 August 1991 (aged 29) | (Algeria) JSM Skikda |
| 9 | (Algeria) | CF | Rachid Nadji | 15 April 1988 (aged 32) | (Algeria) MC Oran |
| 11 | (Algeria) | LW | Abderaouf Chouiter | 8 June 1991 (aged 29) | (Algeria) MC Oran |
| 14 | (Algeria) | CF | Mourad Benayad | 25 September 1990 (aged 30) | (Algeria) CA Bordj Bou Arreridj |
| 19 | (Algeria) | LW | Mohamed Amine Bouziane | 5 February 1996 (aged 24) | (Algeria) RC Arbaâ |
| 28 | (Algeria) | RW | Oualid Ardji | 7 September 1995 (aged 25) | (Algeria) Unattached |
| 29 | (Algeria) | CF | Hamza Banouh | 7 May 1990 (aged 30) | (Algeria) CA Bordj Bou Arréridj |

== Pre-season ==
| 5 November 2020 Tournoi Smaïl Khabatou | JS Kabylie | 1–2 | NA Hussein Dey | Hydra |
| 15:45 | | Report | | Stadium: Stade Ahmed Falek |

== Competitions ==
=== Overview ===
| Competition | Record | | | | | | | | Started round | Final position / round | First match | Last match |
| Competition | G | W | D | L | GF | GA | GD | Win % | Started round | Final position / round | First match | Last match |
|---|---|---|---|---|---|---|---|---|---|---|---|---|
| Ligue 1 | 0 | 0 | 0 | 0 | 0 | 0 | +0 | — | —N/a | To be confirmed | In Progress | In Progress |
| League Cup | 0 | 0 | 0 | 0 | 0 | 0 | +0 | — | Round of 16 | To be confirmed | In Progress | In Progress |
| Total | 0 | 0 | 0 | 0 | 0 | 0 | +0 | — | | | | |

Updated to match played 7 March 2020
Source: Competitions

== League table ==
| Pos | Team | Pld | W | D | L | GF | GA | GD | Pts |
|---|---|---|---|---|---|---|---|---|---|
| 10 | Olympique de Médéa | 38 | 13 | 12 | 13 | 40 | 43 | −3 | 51 |
| 11 | Paradou AC | 38 | 13 | 11 | 14 | 53 | 53 | 0 | 50 |
| 12 | NA Hussein Dey | 38 | 11 | 14 | 13 | 46 | 45 | +1 | 47 |
| 13 | RC Relizane | 38 | 13 | 12 | 13 | 35 | 49 | −14 | 47 (Note: On May 16, 2021 after the participation of a penalized player Younes Koulkheir with RC Relizane against ES Sétif. RC Relizane Lost the match 3–0 and deducted 4 points.) |
| 14 | US Biskra | 38 | 11 | 13 | 14 | 32 | 46 | −14 | 46 |

Updated to match(es) played on 28 August 2021. Source: dzfoot.com
Rules for classification: 1) points; 2) head-to-head points; 3) head-to-head goal difference; 4) goal difference; 5) total goals; 6) fairplay ranking; 7) playoff.

=== Results summary ===
| Overall | | | | | | | | Home | | | | | | Away | | | | | |
| Pld | W | D | L | GF | GA | GD | Pts | W | D | L | GF | GA | GD | W | D | L | GF | GA | GD |
|---|---|---|---|---|---|---|---|---|---|---|---|---|---|---|---|---|---|---|---|
| 0 | 0 | 0 | 0 | 0 | 0 | 0 | 0 | 0 | 0 | 0 | 0 | 0 | 0 | 0 | 0 | 0 | 0 | 0 | 0 |

Last updated: 7 March 2020.
Source: Competitive matches

=== Results by round ===
| Round | 1 | 2 | 3 | 4 | 5 | 6 | 7 | 8 | 9 | 10 | 11 | 12 | 13 | 14 | 15 | 16 | 17 | 18 | 19 | 20 | 21 | 22 | 23 | 24 | 25 | 26 | 27 | 28 | 29 | 30 | 31 | 32 | 33 | 34 | 35 | 36 | 37 | 38 |
|---|---|---|---|---|---|---|---|---|---|---|---|---|---|---|---|---|---|---|---|---|---|---|---|---|---|---|---|---|---|---|---|---|---|---|---|---|---|---|
| Ground | | | | | | | | | | | | | | | | | | | | | | | | | | | | | | | | | | | | | | |
| Result | D | D | D | L | L | L | W | L | D | W | W | L | L | D | W | L | L | D | D | L | D | L | D | L | W | D | D | L | W | W | D | W | L | D | W | W | W | D |
| Position | 7 | 13 | 13 | 15 | 16 | 18 | 16 | 17 | 18 | 14 | 12 | 14 | 14 | 15 | 13 | 14 | 14 | 15 | 15 | 15 | 16 | 17 | 16 | 16 | 15 | 16 | 16 | 16 | 16 | 15 | 16 | 15 | 16 | 17 | 14 | 13 | 13 | 12 |

Updated to match(es) played on 24 August 2021. Source: Competitive matches
A = Away; H = Home; W = Win; D = Draw; L = Loss

=== Matches ===
On 22 October 2020, the Algerian Ligue Professionnelle 1 fixtures were announced.

| 27 November 2020 Round 1 | NA Hussein Dey | 1–1 | MC Oran | Belouizdad |
| 14:30 | Si Ammar 46' | Soccerway report | Boutiche 44' (pen.) | Stadium: Stade 20 Août 1955; Attendance: 0 (close doors); Referee: Abdelali Ibrir |

| 5 December 2020 Round 2 | US Biskra | 0–0 | NA Hussein Dey | Biskra |
| 14:00 | | Soccerway report | | Stadium: Stade du 18 Février; Attendance: 0 (close doors); Referee: Mohamed Boutaraa |

| 11 December 2020 Round 3 | NA Hussein Dey | 1–1 | AS Ain M'lila | Belouizdad |
| 14:30 | Meftah 11' (pen.) | Soccerway report | Djabout 68' (pen.) | Stadium: Stade 20 Août 1955; Attendance: 0 (close doors); Referee: Bilal Bendjahene |

| 19 December 2020 Round 4 | CR Belouizdad | 2–0 | NA Hussein Dey | Belouizdad |
| 14:30 | Belahouel 45+2' (pen.); Souibaâh 88' (pen.) | Soccerway report | | Stadium: Stade 20 Août 1955; Attendance: 0 (close doors); Referee: Youcef Gamouh |

| 27 December 2020 Round 6 | USM Alger | 3–0 | NA Hussein Dey | Bologhine |
| 15:00 | Koudri 44', 75'; Mahious 49' | Soccerway report | | Stadium: Omar Hamadi Stadium; Attendance: 0 (close doors); Referee: Mustapha Bessiri |

| 1 January 2021 Round 5 | NA Hussein Dey | 0–1 | ES Sétif | Belouizdad |
| 14:30 | | Soccerway report | Amoura 66' | Stadium: Stade 20 Août 1955; Attendance: 0 (close doors); Referee: Ahmed Bouzrar |

| 8 January 2021 Round 7 | NA Hussein Dey | 1–0 | ASO Chlef | Belouizdad |
| 14:30 | Si Ammar 85' | Soccerway report | | Stadium: Stade 20 Août 1955; Attendance: 0 (close doors); Referee: Mustapha Ghorbal |

| 15 January 2021 Round 8 | JS Saoura | 2–1 | NA Hussein Dey | Béchar |
| 14:30 | Hamidi 64' (pen.), 80' (pen.) | Soccerway report | Meftah 58' (pen.) | Stadium: Stade 20 Août 1955; Attendance: 0 (close doors); Referee: Malek Ait Ameur |

| 22 January 2021 Round 9 | NA Hussein Dey | 1–1 | NC Magra | Belouizdad |
| 14:30 | Betrouni 71' | Soccerway report | Hainikoye 46' | Stadium: Stade 20 Août 1955; Attendance: 0 (close doors); Referee: Mohamed Boutaraa |

| 26 January 2021 Round 10 | JSM Skikda | 0–1 | NA Hussein Dey | Skikda |
| 14:30 | | Soccerway report | Ait L'Hadi 37' | Stadium: Stade 20 Août 1955; Attendance: 0 (close doors); Referee: Ali Nader |

| 30 January 2021 Round 11 | CA Bordj Bou Arreridj | 1–2 | NA Hussein Dey | Bordj Bou Arréridj |
| 15:00 | Maddour 55' (pen.) | Soccerway report | Bennai 39'; Meftah 90+2' | Stadium: Stade 20 Août 1955; Attendance: 0 (close doors); Referee: Redouane Necib |

| 6 February 2021 Round 12 | NA Hussein Dey | 0–2 | JS Kabylie | Belouizdad |
| 14:30 | | Soccerway report | Benchaira 15'; Bensayah 90' | Stadium: Stade 20 Août 1955; Attendance: 0 (close doors); Referee: Mehdi Abid Charef |

| 13 February 2021 Round 13 | Olympique de Médéa | 2–1 | NA Hussein Dey | Médéa |
| 14:30 | Khalfallah 16', 27' | Soccerway report | Nadji 36' | Stadium: Stade Imam Lyes; Attendance: 0 (close doors); Referee: Mohamed Saïdi |

| 19 February 2021 Round 14 | NA Hussein Dey | 1–1 | USM Bel Abbès | Belouizdad |
| 14:30 | Nadji 12' (pen.) | Soccerway report | Haroun 69' (pen.) | Stadium: Stade 20 Août 1955; Attendance: 0 (close doors); Referee: Abdelali Ibrir |

| 26 February 2021 Round 15 | NA Hussein Dey | 3–0 | RC Relizane | Belouizdad |
| 15:00 | Nadji 16'; Meftah 25'; Banouh 90+3' | Soccerway report | | Stadium: Stade 20 Août 1955; Attendance: 0 (close doors); Referee: Houssam Benyahia |

| 5 March 2021 Round 16 | CS Constantine | 2–1 | NA Hussein Dey | Constantine |
| 15:00 | Yettou 33'; Amokrane 67' | Soccerway report | Meftah 54' | Stadium: Stade Ramdane Benabdelmalek; Attendance: 0 (close doors); Referee: Nabil Boukhalfa |

| 13 March 2021 Round 17 | NA Hussein Dey | 1–2 | Paradou AC | Belouizdad |
| 15:00 | Nadji 76' | Soccerway report | Benbouali 59'; Boucif 73' | Stadium: Stade 20 Août 1955; Attendance: 0 (close doors); Referee: Mehdi Abid Charef |

| 17 March 2021 Round 18 | WA Tlemcen | 1–1 | NA Hussein Dey | Tlemcen |
| 15:00 | Ibouzidène 57' | Soccerway report | Boussalem 45+1' | Stadium: Stade Akid Lotfi; Attendance: 0 (close doors); Referee: Abdelmoumen Touabti |

| 21 March 2021 Round 19 | NA Hussein Dey | 0–0 | MC Alger | Belouizdad |
| 15:00 | | Soccerway report | | Stadium: Stade 20 Août 1955; Attendance: 0 (close doors); Referee: Ahmed Bouzrar |

| 4 May 2021 Round 20 | MC Oran | 3–2 | NA Hussein Dey | Oran |
| 22:30 | Motrani 3'; Mellel 24' (pen.); Guenina 38' | Soccerway report | Sebbah 19'; Banouh 53' | Stadium: Ahmed Zabana Stadium; Attendance: 0 (close doors); Referee: Houssam Benyahia |

| 16 May 2021 Round 21 | NA Hussein Dey | 1–1 | US Biskra | Belouizdad |
| 17:00 | Meftah 17' | Soccerway report | Athmani 47' | Stadium: Stade 20 Août 1955; Attendance: 0 (close doors); Referee: Ali Nader |

| 22 May 2021 Round 22 | AS Ain M'lila | 1–0 | NA Hussein Dey | Aïn M'lila |
| 17:00 | Djabout 76' | Soccerway report | | Stadium: Touhami Zoubir Khelifi Stadium; Attendance: 0 (close doors); Referee: Mustapha Bessiri |

| 26 May 2021 Round 23 | NA Hussein Dey | 2–2 | CR Belouizdad | Belouizdad |
| 17:00 | Boussalem 30'; Banouh 67' | Soccerway report | Sayoud 84', 90+3' | Stadium: Stade 20 Août 1955; Attendance: 0 (close doors); Referee: Nabil Boukhalfa |

| 30 May 2021 Round 24 | ES Sétif | 3–2 | NA Hussein Dey | Sétif |
| 17:00 | Kendouci 8'; Amoura 42'; Debbari 86' | Soccerway report | Chouiter 78', 90+3' | Stadium: Stade 8 Mai 1945; Attendance: 0 (close doors); Referee: Walid Lahrache |

| 18 June 2021 Round 26 | ASO Chlef | 1–1 | NA Hussein Dey | Chlef |
| 17:45 | Bouguettaya 8' | Soccerway report | Sebbah 90+6' | Stadium: Stade Mohamed Boumezrag; Attendance: 0 (close doors); Referee: Mohamed Boutaraa |

| 23 June 2021 Round 25 | NA Hussein Dey | 2–1 | USM Alger | Belouizdad |
| 17:00 | Meftah 54' (pen.); Nadji 83' | Soccerway report | Soula 81' | Stadium: Stade 20 Août 1955; Attendance: 0 (close doors); Referee: Lyés Bekouassa |

| 27 June 2021 Round 27 | NA Hussein Dey | 1–1 | JS Saoura | Belouizdad |
| 17:00 | Nadji 40' | Soccerway report | Lahmeri 45' | Stadium: Stade 20 Août 1955; Attendance: 0 (close doors); Referee: Said Aouina |

| 1 July 2021 Round 28 | NC Magra | 1–0 | NA Hussein Dey | Magra |
| 17:00 | Aïb 57' | Soccerway report | | Stadium: Boucheligue Brothers Stadium; Attendance: 0 (close doors); Referee: Mehdi Abid Charef |

| 4 July 2021 Round 29 | NA Hussein Dey | 2–0 | JSM Skikda | Belouizdad |
| 17:30 | Nadji 23'; Yaya 27' (pen.) | Soccerway report | | Stadium: Stade 20 Août 1955; Attendance: 0 (close doors); Referee: Abdelkader Belhabib |

| 8 July 2021 Round 30 | NA Hussein Dey | 3–0 | CA Bordj Bou Arreridj | Belouizdad |
| 18:00 | Benayad 62', 81' (pen.); Yaya 85' | Soccerway report | | Stadium: Stade 20 Août 1955; Attendance: 0 (close doors); Referee: Mahdi Dehina |

| 14 July 2021 Round 31 | JS Kabylie | 1–1 | NA Hussein Dey | Tizi Ouzou |
| 21:00 | Bencherifa 74' | Soccerway report | Boussalem 49' | Stadium: Stade 1er Novembre 1954; Attendance: 0 (close doors); Referee: Mohamed Saïdi |

| 18 July 2021 Round 32 | NA Hussein Dey | 3–0 | Olympique de Médéa | Belouizdad |
| 18:00 | Benayad 2', 59'; Bouziane 51' | Soccerway report | | Stadium: Stade 20 Août 1955; Attendance: 0 (close doors); Referee: Bilal Bendjahene |

| 23 July 2021 Round 33 | USM Bel Abbès | 1–0 | NA Hussein Dey | Sidi Bel Abbès |
| 20:30 | Ounnas 75' (pen.) | Soccerway report | | Stadium: Stade 24 Fevrier 1956; Attendance: 0 (close doors); Referee: Houssam Benyahia |

| 27 July 2021 Round 34 | RC Relizane | 0–0 | NA Hussein Dey | Relizane |
| 18:00 | | Soccerway report | | Stadium: Stade Tahar Zoughari; Attendance: 0 (close doors); Referee: Youcef Gamouh |

| 9 August 2021 Round 35 | NA Hussein Dey | 2–1 | CS Constantine | Belouizdad |
| 17:30 | Nadji 47'; Benayad 49' | Soccerway report | Dib 54' | Stadium: Stade 20 Août 1955; Attendance: 0 (close doors); Referee: Said Aouina |

| 16 August 2021 Round 36 | Paradou AC | 2–3 | NA Hussein Dey | Dar El Beïda |
| 17:30 | Zerrouki 57'; Titraoui 87' | Soccerway report | Ardji 5'; Nadji 30'; Meftah 90+3' | Stadium: Omar Benrabah Stadium; Attendance: 0 (close doors); Referee: Mohamed Boutaraa |

| 21 August 2021 Round 37 | NA Hussein Dey | 1–0 | WA Tlemcen | Belouizdad |
| 17:30 | Meftah 42' | Soccerway report | | Stadium: Stade 20 Août 1955; Attendance: 0 (close doors); Referee: Abdelali Ibrir |

| 24 August 2021 Round 38 | MC Alger | 4–4 | NA Hussein Dey | Bologhine |
| 17:30 | Bouzekri 3'; Esso 6', 21' (pen.), 71' | Soccerway report | Boussalem 1'; Yaya 40', 45'; Betrouni 69' | Stadium: Omar Hamadi Stadium; Attendance: 0 (close doors); Referee: Nadjib Meziani |

== Algerian League Cup ==
| 20 April 2021 Preliminary round | NA Hussein Dey | 4–0 | AS Aïn M'lila | Belouizdad |
| 15:30 | Boussalem 3', 52'; Banouh 30', 65' | Report | | Stadium: Stade 20 Août 1955; Attendance: 0 (close doors); Referee: Mustapha Bessiri |
Note: Lineup for NA Hussein Dey - Benchlef (Mimoune, 85'), Meftah, Aggoun, Azzi, Sebbah, Sidhoum, El Orfi, Bouloudène, Chouiter, Boussalem, Banouh.

| 8 May 2021 Round of 16 | JS Kabylie | 2–0 | NA Hussein Dey | Tizi Ouzou |
| 22:30 | Kerroum 67'; Boualia 84' | | | Stadium: Stade 1er Novembre 1954; Attendance: 0 (close doors); Referee: Mehdi Abid Charef |
Note: Lineup for NA Hussein Dey - Benchlef, Meftah, Aggoun, Azzi, Sebbah, Sidhoum (Nadji, 77'), El Orfi, Ouaji (Bouloudène, 64'), Boussalem (Ardji, 64'), Banouh, Chouiter.

== Squad information ==
=== Playing statistics ===
| No. | Pos | Nat | Player | Total | | Ligue 1 | | League Cup | |
| No. | Pos | Nat | Player | Apps | Goals | Apps | Goals | Apps | Goals |
Goalkeepers
| 27 | GK | (Algeria) ALG | Mohamed Seddik Mokrani | 0 | 0 | 0 | 0 | 0 | 0 |
| | GK | (Algeria) ALG | Chaher Eddine Chaouch | 0 | 0 | 0 | 0 | 0 | 0 |
| 16 | GK | (Algeria) ALG | Imad Benchlef | 0 | 0 | 0 | 0 | 0 | 0 |
Defenders
| 4 | DF | (Algeria) ALG | Imad Eddine Azzi | 0 | 0 | 0 | 0 | 0 | 0 |
| 23 | DF | (Algeria) ALG | Mounir Ait L'Hadi | 0 | 0 | 0 | 0 | 0 | 0 |
| 3 | DF | (Algeria) ALG | Mehdi Ferrahi | 0 | 0 | 0 | 0 | 0 | 0 |
| 13 | DF | (Algeria) ALG | Farès Aggoun | 0 | 0 | 0 | 0 | 0 | 0 |
| 15 | DF | (Algeria) ALG | Zine El-Abidine Sebbah | 0 | 0 | 0 | 0 | 0 | 0 |
| 17 | DF | (Algeria) ALG | Aymen Boucheriha | 0 | 0 | 0 | 0 | 0 | 0 |
| 21 | DF | (Algeria) ALG | Kousseila Temericht | 0 | 0 | 0 | 0 | 0 | 0 |
| 22 | DF | (Algeria) ALG | Mohamed Rabie Meftah | 0 | 0 | 0 | 0 | 0 | 0 |
| 24 | DF | (Algeria) ALG | Ishak Guebli | 0 | 0 | 0 | 0 | 0 | 0 |
| 26 | DF | (Algeria) ALG | Merouane Boussalem | 0 | 0 | 0 | 0 | 0 | 0 |
Midfielders
| 6 | MF | (Algeria) ALG | Hocine El Orfi | 0 | 0 | 0 | 0 | 0 | 0 |
| 8 | MF | (Algeria) ALG | Ilyes Sidhoum | 0 | 0 | 0 | 0 | 0 | 0 |
| 12 | MF | (Algeria) ALG | Abdallah Nacef | 0 | 0 | 0 | 0 | 0 | 0 |
| 10 | MF | (Algeria) ALG | Faouzi Yaya | 0 | 0 | 0 | 0 | 0 | 0 |
| 11 | MF | (Algeria) ALG | Raouf Chouiter | 0 | 0 | 0 | 0 | 0 | 0 |
| 18 | MF | (Algeria) ALG | Salim Bennai | 0 | 0 | 0 | 0 | 0 | 0 |
| 19 | MF | (Algeria) ALG | Mohamed Amine Bouziane | 0 | 0 | 0 | 0 | 0 | 0 |
| 20 | MF | (Algeria) ALG | Laid Ouaji | 0 | 0 | 0 | 0 | 0 | 0 |
| 25 | MF | (Algeria) ALG | Islam Bouloudène | 0 | 0 | 0 | 0 | 0 | 0 |
Forwards
| 7 | FW | (Algeria) ALG | Mohamed Reda Betrouni | 0 | 0 | 0 | 0 | 0 | 0 |
| 9 | FW | (Algeria) ALG | Rachid Nadji | 0 | 0 | 0 | 0 | 0 | 0 |
| 14 | FW | (Algeria) ALG | Mourad Benayad | 0 | 0 | 0 | 0 | 0 | 0 |
Players transferred out during the season

Last updated: 27 November 2020

=== Goalscorers ===
Includes all competitive matches. The list is sorted alphabetically by surname when total goals are equal.

== Transfers ==
=== In ===
| Date | Pos | Player | From club | Transfer fee | Source |
|---|---|---|---|---|---|
| 22 August 2020 | MF | (Algeria) Hocine El Orfi | (Saudi Arabia) Al-Mujazzal | Free transfer | |
| 24 August 2020 | FW | (Algeria) Réda Betrouni | JSM Skikda | Free transfer | |
| 26 August 2020 | MF | (Algeria) Mohamed Sabri Benbrahim | (Tunisia) US Tataouine | Free transfer | |
| 26 August 2020 | FW | (Algeria) Younès Islam | RC Boumerdes | Free transfer | |
| 7 September 2020 | DF | (Algeria) Mohamed Rabie Meftah | USM Alger | Free transfer | |
| 7 September 2020 | DF | (Algeria) Zine El-Abidine Sebbah | MC Oran | Free transfer | |
| 9 September 2020 | MF | (Algeria) Abderraouf Chouiter | MC Oran | Free transfer | |
| 10 September 2020 | FW | (Algeria) Rachid Nadji | MC Oran | Free transfer | |
| 27 January 2021 | LW / LB | (Algeria) Oualid Ardji | Unattached | Free transfer | |

=== Out ===
| Date | Pos | Player | To club | Transfer fee | Source |
|---|---|---|---|---|---|
| 11 October 2020 | CB | (Algeria) Zineddine Belaïd | USM Alger | Undisclosed | |
| 13 October 2020 | RW | (Algeria) Zinedine Boutmène | (Tunisia) Club Africain | 200,000 € | |
