= 2021–22 NA Hussein Dey season =

NA Hussein Dey
2021–22 season
- President: Mahfoud Ould Zmirli (until 13 September 2021)
- Head coach: Karim Zaoui (from 28 September 2021) (until 23 December 2021); Chérif Abdeslam (from 23 December 2021) (until 5 February 2022); Mohamed Mekhazni (from 6 March 2022) (until 15 March 2022); Lyamine Bougherara (from 15 March 2022)
- Stadium: Stade 20 Août 1955
- Ligue 1: 16th (relegated)
- Top goalscorer: League: Mourad Benayad (8 goals); All: Mourad Benayad (8 goals)

In the 2021–22 season, NA Hussein Dey is competing in the Ligue 1 for the 46th season. It is their 8th consecutive season in the top flight of Algerian football. They competing in Ligue 1. On September 13, after nearly 11 years as Chairman of the Board of Directors of SSPA NA Hussein Dey, Mahfoud Ould Zmirli has confirmed his departure. However, he will retain his shareholder status.

== Squad list ==
Players and squad numbers last updated on 20 October 2021.
Note: Flags indicate national team as has been defined under FIFA eligibility rules. Players may hold more than one non-FIFA nationality.

No.	Nat.	Position	Name	Date of birth (age)	Signed from
Goalkeepers
1	(Algeria)	GK	Imad Benchlef	12 October 1993 (aged 28)	(Algeria) US Draa Ben Khedda
16	(Algeria)	GK	Ahmed Boutagga	18 December 1997 (aged 24)	(Algeria) MC Alger
22	(Algeria)	GK	Yaakoub Rouag	6 July 1993 (aged 28)	(Algeria) ESM Koléa
Defenders
3	(Algeria)	LB	Mehdi Ferrahi	22 January 1997 (aged 24)	(Algeria) RC Kouba
4	(Algeria)	CB	Rayan Senhadji	13 June 1997 (aged 24)	(Algeria) Unattached
12	(Algeria)	RB	Kheir Eddine Ali Haïmoud	12 June 1999 (aged 22)	(Algeria) Paradou AC
13	(Algeria)	LB	Farès Aggoun	7 May 1990 (aged 31)	(Algeria) CA Bordj Bou Arreridj
15	(Algeria)	CB	Zine El-Abidine Sebbah	22 March 1987 (aged 34)	(Algeria) MC Oran
19	(Algeria)	CB	Mustapha Kheiraoui	7 October 1995 (aged 26)	(Algeria) USM Bel Abbès
21	(Algeria)	CB	Kousseila Temericht	24 June 1998 (aged 23)	(Algeria) MO Béjaïa
24	(Algeria)	CB	Ishak Guebli	25 April 1987 (aged 34)	(Algeria) US Biskra
26	(Algeria)	RB	Merouane Boussalem	11 February 1996 (aged 25)	(Algeria) MO Béjaïa
Midfielders
2	(Algeria)	MF	Moncef Chakib Taguemount	28 January 1999 (aged 22)	(Algeria) Youth System
5	(Algeria)	MF	Mohand Bekkouche	24 January 1995 (aged 26)	(Algeria) US Chaouia
6	(Algeria)	MF	Hocine El Orfi	27 January 1987 (aged 34)	(Saudi Arabia) Al-Mujazzal
10	(Algeria)	MF	Faouzi Yaya	21 September 1989 (aged 32)	(Algeria) USM Alger
18	(Algeria)	MF	Salim Bennai	25 March 1997 (aged 24)	(Algeria) US Biskra
20	(Algeria)	MF	Houssem Bayoud	21 October 1998 (aged 23)	(Algeria) USM El Harrach
23	(Algeria)	MF	Mounir Ait El Hadi	18 August 1994 (aged 27)	(Algeria) JS Hai El Djabel
25	(Algeria)	MF	Islam Bouloudène	31 May 1995 (aged 26)	(Algeria) A Bou Saâda
27	(Algeria)	MF	Zohir Hamdaoui	26 July 1997 (aged 24)	(Algeria) JS Bordj Ménaïel
Forwards
7	(Algeria)	FW	Mohamed Reda Betrouni	19 August 1991 (aged 30)	(Algeria) JSM Skikda
8	(Algeria)	FW	Oualid Ardji	7 September 1995 (aged 26)	(Algeria) Unattached
9	(Algeria)	FW	Rachid Nadji	15 April 1988 (aged 33)	(Algeria) MC Oran
11	(Algeria)	FW	Abderaouf Chouiter	8 June 1991 (aged 30)	(Algeria) MC Oran
14	(Algeria)	FW	Mourad Benayad	25 September 1990 (aged 31)	(Algeria) CA Bordj Bou Arreridj
17	(Algeria)	FW	Hamza Banouh	7 May 1990 (aged 31)	(Algeria) CA Bordj Bou Arréridj

== Competitions ==
=== Overview ===
Competition	Record								Started round	Final position / round	First match	Last match
Competition	G	W	D	L	GF	GA	GD	Win %	Started round	Final position / round	First match	Last match
Ligue 1	34	5	7	22	33	66	−33	14.71	—N/a	16th	23 October 2021	10 June 2022
Total	34	5	7	22	33	66	−33	14.71				

Updated to match played 10 June 2022
Source: Competitions

== League table ==
Pos	Team	Pld	W	D	L	GF	GA	GD	Pts	Qualification or relegation
14	RC Arbaâ	34	10	13	11	40	45	−5	43	
15	Olympique de Médéa (R)	34	10	6	18	32	53	−21	36	Relegation to Algerian Ligue 2
16	NA Hussein Dey (R)	34	5	7	22	33	66	−33	22	Relegation to Algerian Ligue 2
17	RC Relizane (R)	34	4	8	22	31	87	−56	20	Relegation to Algerian Ligue 2
18	WA Tlemcen (R)	34	3	4	27	13	72	−59	13	Relegation to Algerian Ligue 2

Updated to match(es) played on 17 June 2022. Source: the-sports.org
Rules for classification: 1) points; 2) head-to-head points; 3) head-to-head goal difference; 4) goal difference; 5) total goals; 6) fairplay ranking; 7) playoff.
(R) Relegated

=== Results summary ===
Overall								Home						Away					
Pld	W	D	L	GF	GA	GD	Pts	W	D	L	GF	GA	GD	W	D	L	GF	GA	GD
34	5	7	22	33	66	−33	22	3	3	11	20	35	−15	2	4	11	13	31	−18

Last updated: 10 June 2022.
Source: Competitive matches

=== Results by round ===
Round	1	2	3	4	5	6	7	8	9	10	11	12	13	14	15	16	17	18	19	20	21	22	23	24	25	26	27	28	29	30	31	32	33	34
Ground	H	A	H	A	H	A	H	A	H	A	H	A	H	A	A	H	A	A	H	A	H	A	H	A	H	A	H	A	H	A	H	H	A	H
Result	D	W	D	D	W	L	L	D	L	L	L	W	D	L	L	L	L	L	W	L	L	D	L	L	W	L	L	D	L	L	L	L	L	L
Position	9	4	6	9	7	10	10	10	11	11	12	11	11	10	13	14	15	15	15	15	16	15	16	16	16	16	16	16	16	16	16	16	16	16

Updated to match(es) played on 10 June 2022. Source: Competitive matches
A = Away; H = Home; W = Win; D = Draw; L = Loss

=== Matches ===
The league fixtures were announced on 7 October 2021.

23 October 2021 Round 1	NA Hussein Dey	1–1	USM Alger	Belouizdad
16:00	Banouh 70'	LFP report	Hamra 42'	Stadium: Stade 20 Août 1955; Attendance: 0 (Note: The match was played behind closed doors due to the COVID-19 pandemic in Algeria.); Referee: Abdelali Ibrir

29 October 2021 Round 2	HB Chelghoum Laïd	0–1	NA Hussein Dey	Chelghoum Laïd
15:00		Report	Nadji 67'	Stadium: 11 December 1961 Stadium; Referee: Ali Nader

7 November 2021 Round 3	NA Hussein Dey	2–2	JS Kabylie	Belouizdad
15:00	Banouh 6'; Nadji 37'	Report	Mouaki 87'; Bensayah 89'	Stadium: Stade 20 Août 1955; Attendance: 0 (closed doors); Referee: Mohamed Boutaraa

20 November 2021 Round 4	ASO Chlef	0–0	NA Hussein Dey	Chlef
15:00		Report		Stadium: Stade Mohamed Boumezrag; Referee: Bilal Bendjahene

25 November 2021 Round 5	NA Hussein Dey	2–1	MC Oran	Belouizdad
14:30	Nadji 27', 47'	Report	Guenina 39' (pen.)	Stadium: Stade 20 Août 1955; Attendance: 0 (close doors); Referee: Said Aouina

4 December 2021 Round 6	CR Belouizdad	1–0	NA Hussein Dey	Belouizdad
14:30	Nessakh 62'	Report		Stadium: Stade 20 Août 1955; Attendance: 0 (close doors); Referee: Lahlou Benbraham

11 December 2021 Round 7	NA Hussein Dey	0–1	NC Magra	Belouizdad
14:30		Report	Amiri 40' (pen.)	Stadium: Stade 20 Août 1955; Attendance: 0 (close doors); Referee: Youcef Taieb Bouderbal

18 December 2021 Round 8	WA Tlemcen	2–2	NA Hussein Dey	Tlemcen
13:30	Belgherbi 73' (pen.); Gali Zerargua 90+5'	Report	Benseghir 60'; Derardja 82'	Stadium: Stade Akid Lotfi; Referee: Youcef Gamouh

24 December 2021 Round 9	NA Hussein Dey	1–4	MC Alger	Belouizdad
15:00	Boussalem 64' (pen.)	Report	Belkheir 25'; Frioui 32'; Morsli 82'; Abdelhafid 90+5'	Stadium: Stade 20 Août 1955; Attendance: 0 (close doors); Referee: Nabil Boukhalfa

28 December 2021 Round 10	CS Constantine	2–1	NA Hussein Dey	Constantine
14:30	Koukpo 76', 89'	Report	Banouh 73'	Stadium: Stade Ramdane Benabdelmalek; Referee: Bilal Bendjahene

2 January 2022 Round 11	NA Hussein Dey	0–2	Paradou AC	Belouizdad
14:00		Report	Benbouali 90'; Boucif 90+6'	Stadium: Stade 20 Août 1955; Attendance: 0 (close doors); Referee: Abdelmoumen Touabti

8 January 2022 Round 12	Olympique de Médéa	1–2	NA Hussein Dey	Médéa
14:30	Baâli 77'	Report	Banouh 44'; Chouiter 49'	Stadium: Stade Imam Lyes; Referee: Akram Mechairia

15 January 2022 Round 13	NA Hussein Dey	0–0	ES Sétif	Belouizdad
15:00		Report		Stadium: Stade 20 Août 1955; Attendance: 0 (close doors); Referee: Ali Nader

21 January 2022 Round 14	RC Relizane	2–1	NA Hussein Dey	Relizane
14:00	Si Ammar 35'; Balegh 90+4'	Report	Hamdaoui 12'	Stadium: Stade Tahar Zoughari; Referee: Abderrezzak Arab

25 January 2022 Round 15	RC Arbaâ	3–1	NA Hussein Dey	Larbaâ
14:00	Boubakour 18'; Oukil 21', 73' (pen.)	Report	Bouloudene 84'	Stadium: Ismaïl Makhlouf Stadium; Attendance: 0 (close doors); Referee: Riadh Ammar Khodja

29 January 2022 Round 16	NA Hussein Dey	1–2	JS Saoura	Belouizdad
14:30	Ardji 5'	Report	Mellal 77', 90+2'	Stadium: Stade 20 Août 1955; Attendance: 0 (close doors); Referee: Youcef Gamouh

5 February 2022 Round 17	US Biskra	2–1	NA Hussein Dey	Biskra
13:30	Boukarroum 65'; Lakhdari 85'	Report	Bouloudene 33'	Stadium: Stade du 18 Février; Referee: Mohamad Salah Dafri

25 February 2022 Round 18	USM Alger	1–0	NA Hussein Dey	Bologhine
18:00	Mahious 25' (pen.); Meziane (yellow card) 33'; Benzaza (yellow card) 69'; Belkacemi (yellow card) 90+1'	Report	Bouloudène (yellow card) 39'; Benayad (yellow card) 76'; Aggoun (yellow card) 90+3'	Stadium: Omar Hamadi Stadium; Attendance: 0 (close doors); Referee: Hamza Bouslimani

1 March 2022 Round 19	NA Hussein Dey	2–1	HB Chelghoum Laïd	Belouizdad
14:00	Aggoun 33'; Benayad 64'	Report	Demane 47'	Stadium: Stade 20 Août 1955; Attendance: 0 (close doors); Referee: Abdellah Benchehida

6 March 2022 Round 20	JS Kabylie	3–2	NA Hussein Dey	Tizi Ouzou
14:30	Ouattara 18'; Mouaki 43'; Boukhanchouche 57' (pen.)	Report	Benayad 38' (pen.), 90+4' (pen.)	Stadium: Stade 1er Novembre 1954; Referee: Nabil Boukhalfa

12 March 2022 Round 21	NA Hussein Dey	0–2	ASO Chlef	Belouizdad
14:30		Report	Aliane 38', 57'	Stadium: Stade 20 Août 1955; Attendance: 0 (close doors); Referee: Youcef Gamouh

18 March 2022 Round 22	MC Oran	0–0	NA Hussein Dey	Oran
14:00		Report		Stadium: Ahmed Zabana Stadium; Referee: Abderrezzak Arab

27 March 2022 Round 23	NA Hussein Dey	3–5	CR Belouizdad	Belouizdad
16:00	Bekkouche 15'; Benayad 45+2', 90'	Report	Merzougui 40'; Bousseliou 64'; Aribi 77', 85', 88'	Stadium: Stade 20 Août 1955; Attendance: 0 (close doors); Referee: Mehdi Abid Charef

1 April 2022 Round 24	NC Magra	1–0	NA Hussein Dey	Magra
15:30	Bourahla 29'	Report		Stadium: Boucheligue Brothers Stadium; Referee: Mohamed Saïdi

12 April 2022 Round 25	NA Hussein Dey	3–1	WA Tlemcen	Belouizdad
15:45	Meddahi 22' (pen.); Boussalem 45+1'; Yaya 77'	Report	Ouassini 50'	Stadium: Stade 20 Août 1955; Attendance: 0 (close doors); Referee: Mohamad Salah Dafri

17 April 2022 Round 26	MC Alger	2–0	NA Hussein Dey	Algiers
22:30	Frioui 31', 45+1'	Report		Stadium: Stade du 5 Juillet; Attendance: 0 (close doors); Referee: Lotfi Bekouassa

22 April 2022 Round 27	NA Hussein Dey	1–4	CS Constantine	Belouizdad
23:30	Benayad 37' (pen.)	Report	Dib 34', 44' (pen.); Aiboud 58'; Koukpo 70'	Stadium: Stade 20 Août 1955; Attendance: 0 (close doors); Referee: Mohamed Boutaraa

29 April 2022 Round 28	Paradou AC	1–1	NA Hussein Dey	Bologhine
22:30	Benbouali 73'	Report	Akziz 90'	Stadium: Omar Hamadi Stadium; Attendance: 0 (close doors); Referee: Massinissa Merakchi

7 May 2022 Round 29	NA Hussein Dey	0–1	Olympique de Médéa	Belouizdad
17:00		Report	Bellaouel 88'	Stadium: Stade 20 Août 1955; Attendance: 0 (close doors); Referee: Bilal Bendjahene

14 June 2022 Round 30	ES Sétif	5–1	NA Hussein Dey	Sétif
19:45	Bakrar 5', 58'; Nemdil 51' (pen.); Kendouci 53'; Darfalou 63'	Report	Akziz 78'	Stadium: 8 May 1945 Stadium; Referee: Said Aouina

21 May 2022 Round 31	NA Hussein Dey	3–5	RC Relizane	Belouizdad
17:00	Benayad 38', 45+1'; Bekkouche 43'	Report	Balegh 10', 34', 82', 90'; Gharbi 69'	Stadium: Stade 20 Août 1955; Attendance: 0 (close doors); Referee: Ahmed Daas

27 May 2022 Round 32	NA Hussein Dey	0–1	RC Arbaâ	Belouizdad
17:45	Boubakour 56'	Report		Stadium: Stade 20 Août 1955; Attendance: 0 (close doors); Referee: Abdellah Benchehida

5 June 2022 Round 33	JS Saoura	5–0	NA Hussein Dey	Béchar
20:00	Hamidi 9' (pen.); Mellal 20'; Saâd 28', 80'; Hammia 58'	Report		Stadium: Stade 20 Août 1955; Referee: Oussama Boumesdjed

10 June 2022 Round 34	NA Hussein Dey	1–2	US Biskra	Belouizdad
17:45	Benseghir 48'	Report	Fenniri 4'; Thamer 7'	Stadium: Stade 20 Août 1955; Attendance: 0 (close doors); Referee: Lamia Athmane

== Squad information ==
=== Playing statistics ===
No.	Pos	Nat	Player	Total		Ligue 1	
No.	Pos	Nat	Player	Apps	Goals	Apps	Goals
Goalkeepers
1	GK	(Algeria) ALG	Imad Benchlef	13	0	13	0
16	GK	(Algeria) ALG	Ahmed Boutagga	14	0	14	0
22	GK	(Algeria) ALG	Yaakoub Rouag	4	0	4	0
Defenders
3	DF	(Algeria) ALG	Mehdi Ferrahi	23	0	23	0
4	DF	(Algeria) ALG	Rayan Senhadji	0	0	0	0
12	DF	(Algeria) ALG	Kheir Eddine Ali Haïmoud	11	0	11	0
13	DF	(Algeria) ALG	Farès Aggoun	20	1	20	1
15	DF	(Algeria) ALG	Zine El-Abidine Sebbah	0	0	0	0
19	DF	(Algeria) ALG	Mustapha Kheiraoui	13	0	13	0
21	DF	(Algeria) ALG	Kousseila Temericht	24	0	24	0
24	DF	(Algeria) ALG	Ishak Guebli	12	0	12	0
Midfielders
2	MF	(Algeria) ALG	Moncef Chakib Taguemount	2	0	2	0
5	MF	(Algeria) ALG	Mohand Bekkouche	24	2	24	2
6	MF	(Algeria) ALG	Hocine El Orfi	1	0	1	0
10	MF	(Algeria) ALG	Faouzi Yaya	9	1	9	1
18	MF	(Algeria) ALG	Salim Bennai	27	0	27	0
20	MF	(Algeria) ALG	Houssem Bayoud	22	0	22	0
23	MF	(Algeria) ALG	Mounir Ait El Hadi	14	0	14	0
25	MF	(Algeria) ALG	Islam Bouloudène	23	2	23	2
27	MF	(Algeria) ALG	Zohir Hamdaoui	18	1	18	1
	MF	(Algeria) ALG	Kamel Belarbi	9	0	9	0
	MF	(Algeria) ALG	Mohamed Amine Derardja	19	1	19	1
	MF	(Algeria) ALG	Adlane Messaoudi	19	0	19	0
Forwards
7	FW	(Algeria) ALG	Mohamed Reda Betrouni	2	0	2	0
11	FW	(Algeria) ALG	Abderaouf Chouiter	15	1	15	1
14	FW	(Algeria) ALG	Mourad Benayad	17	8	17	8
17	FW	(Algeria) ALG	Hamza Banouh	19	4	19	4
	FW	(Algeria) ALG	Hamza Benseghir	19	2	19	2
26	FW	(Algeria) ALG	Merouane Boussalem	23	2	23	2
	FW	(Algeria) ALG	Mohamed Aimen Akziz	4	2	4	2
Players transferred out during the season
8	FW	(Algeria) ALG	Oualid Ardji	10	1	10	1
9	FW	(Algeria) ALG	Rachid Nadji	7	4	7	4

Last updated: 10 June 2022
Source: fr.soccerway.com

=== Goalscorers ===
Includes all competitive matches. The list is sorted alphabetically by surname when total goals are equal.

No.	Nat.	Player	Pos.	L 1	TOTAL
14	(Algeria)	Mourad Benayad	FW	8	8
17	(Algeria)	Hamza Banouh	FW	4	4
9	(Algeria)	Rachid Nadji	FW	4	4
25	(Algeria)	Islam Bouloudène	FW	2	2
	(Algeria)	Hamza Benseghir	FW	2	2
	(Algeria)	Mohamed Aimen Akziz	FW	2	2
26	(Algeria)	Merouane Boussalem	FW	2	2
5	(Algeria)	Mohand Bekkouche	MF	2	2
13	(Algeria)	Farès Aggoun	DF	1	1
10	(Algeria)	Faouzi Yaya	MF	1	1
27	(Algeria)	Zohir Hamdaoui	MF	1	1
	(Algeria)	Mohamed Amine Derardja	MF	1	1
11	(Algeria)	Abderaouf Chouiter	FW	1	1
8	(Algeria)	Oualid Ardji	FW	1	1
Own Goals				0	0
Totals				33	33

== Transfers ==
=== In ===
Date	Pos	Player	From club	Transfer fee	Source
28 September 2021	MF	(Algeria) Zohir Hamdaoui	JS Bordj Ménaïel	Free transfer	
29 September 2021	MF	(Algeria) Mohamed Bekkouche	US Chaouia	Free transfer	
29 September 2021	GK	(Algeria) Yaakoub Rouag	ESM Koléa	Free transfer	
29 September 2021	MF	(Algeria) Houssem Bayoud	USM El Harrach	Free transfer	
15 October 2021	RB	(Algeria) Kheir Eddine Ali Haïmoud	Paradou AC	Loan	
17 October 2021	CB	(Algeria) Mustapha Kheiraoui	USM Bel Abbès	Free transfer	
20 October 2021	GK	(Algeria) Ahmed Boutagga	MC Alger	Free transfer	

=== Out ===
Date	Pos	Player	To club	Transfer fee	Source
1 September 2021	DM	(Algeria) Laid Ouaji	JS Kabylie	Free transfer	
20 September 2021	MF	(Algeria) Ilyes Sidhoum	Olympique de Médéa	Free transfer	
24 September 2021	GK	(Algeria) Wassim Mimoune	Olympique de Médéa	Free transfer	
8 October 2021	RB	(Algeria) Mohamed Rabie Meftah	AS Aïn M'lila	Free transfer	
8 October 2021	CB	(Algeria) Aymen Boucheriha	AS Aïn M'lila	Free transfer	
20 October 2021	MF	(Algeria) Ibrahim Si Ammar	RC Relizane	Free transfer	
20 October 2021	MF	(Algeria) Mohamed Amine Bouziane	RC Arbaâ	Free transfer	
12 February 2022	FW	(Algeria) Rachid Nadji	(Saudi Arabia) Al-Nahda	Free transfer	
22 February 2022	FW	(Algeria) Oualid Ardji	CS Constantine	Free transfer	
