= Fouad Allag =

Algerian footballer (born 1985)

Personal information
- Date of birth: 17 April 1985 (age 41)
- Position: Midfielder

Team information
- Current team: RC Relizane
- Number: 20

Senior career*
Years	Team	Apps	(Gls)
2011–2012	NA Hussein Dey	24	(2)
2012–2015	CS Constantine	68	(1)
2015–2016	NA Hussein Dey	8	(1)
2016–	RC Relizane	9	(0)
- * Club domestic league appearances and goals as of 11 December 2016

Fouad Allag (born 17 April 1985) is an Algerian footballer who played primarily as a defensive midfielder for RC Relizane in the Algerian Ligue Professionnelle 2 which he is reported to have left on 1 September 2021.

He has 2 caps for representing Algeria in its under-23 squad in November 2007.
