= Ahmed Gasmi =

Algerian footballer (born 1984)

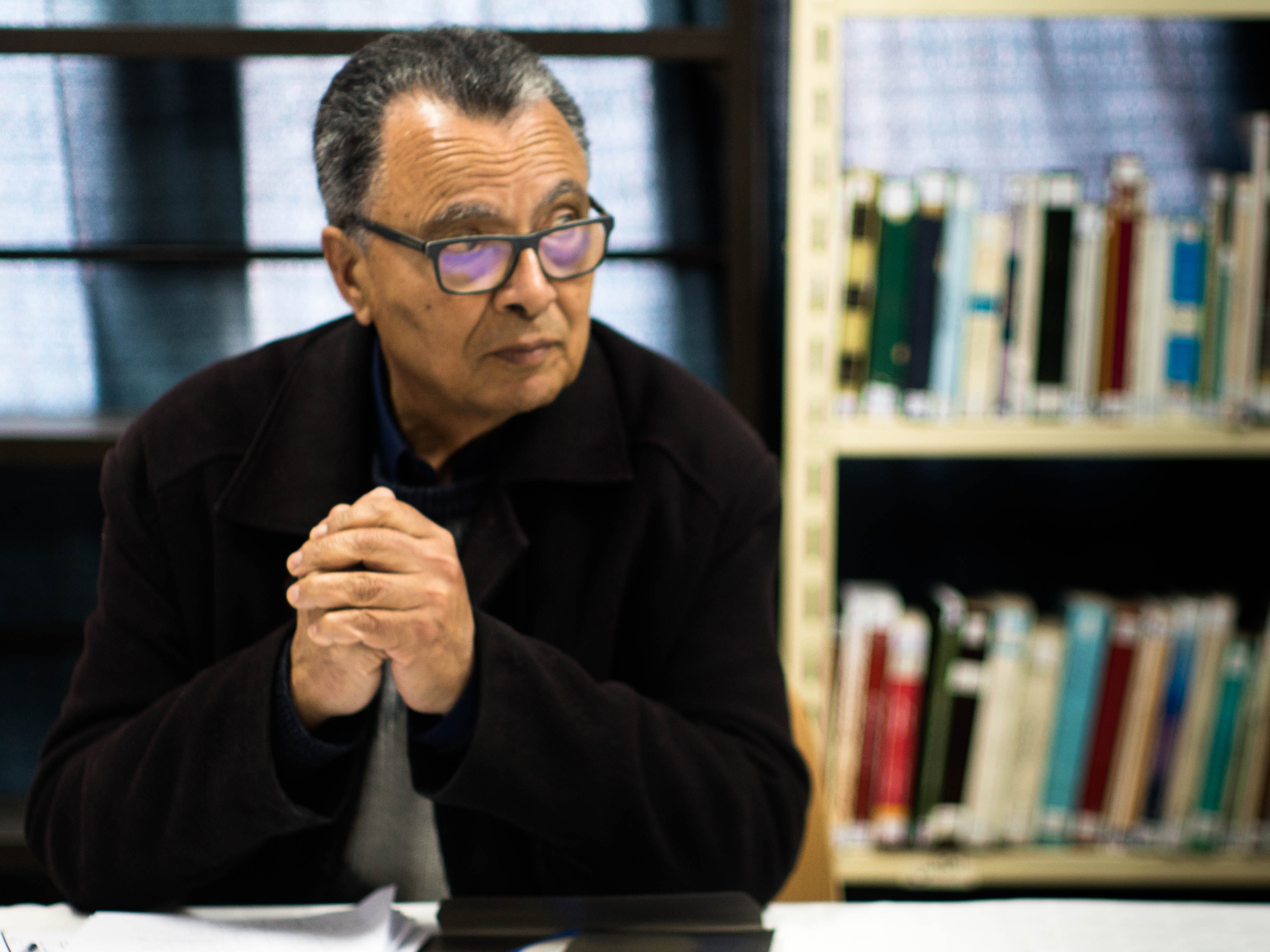

Personal information
- Full name: Ahmed Gasmi
- Date of birth: 22 November 1984 (age 41)
- Place of birth: Skikda, Algeria
- Height: 1.87 m (6 ft 2 in)
- Position: Striker

Team information
- Current team: RC Kouba
- Number: 17

Senior career*
Years	Team	Apps	(Gls)
2008–2009	MC El Eulma	29	(6)
2009–2010	USM Annaba	29	(10)
2010–2012	JSM Béjaïa	49	(19)
2012–2014	USM Alger	40	(14)
2014–2015	ES Sétif	16	(2)
2015–2019	NA Hussein Dey	55	(26)
2019–2021	CR Belouizdad	15	(1)
2021-	RC Kouba		(0)

International career^{‡}
2009–	Algeria A'	9	(0)
2012–	Algeria	1	(0)
- * Club domestic league appearances and goals as of 00:00, April 10, 2021 (EST) ‡ National team caps and goals as of 00:00, April 10, 2021 (EST)

Ahmed Gasmi (born 22 November 1984) is an Algerian footballer who plays for RC Kouba in the Algerian Ligue 2.

== Club career ==
On 27 June 2010 Gasmi signed a one-year contract with JSM Béjaïa, joining them on a free transfer from USM Annaba.

== International career ==
On 29 October 2009 Gasmi was called up to the Algeria A' National Team by head coach Abdelhak Benchikha for the first time for a week-long training camp. On 3 March 2010 Gasmi made his official debut for the team starting in a 4–0 win over Lichtenstein.

== Honours ==
- USM Alger
  - Algerian Cup: 2012–13
  - UAFA Club Cup: 2012–13
  - Algerian Super Cup: 2013
  - Ligue 1: 2013-14
