= Aymen Madi =

Algerian footballer (born 1988)

Personal information
- Full name: Aymen Madi
- Date of birth: December 26, 1988 (age 37)
- Position: Midfielder

Senior career*
Years	Team	Apps	(Gls)
2008–2011	RC Kouba	-	(-)
2011–2013	NA Hussein Dey	-	(-)
2013–2014	JS Kabylie	16	(1)
2014–2015	NA Hussein Dey	18	(1)
- * Club domestic league appearances and goals as of 1 January 2016

Aymen Madi (born December 26, 1988) is an Algerian former footballer who played in the Algerian Ligue Professionnelle 1.

== Club career ==
Born in Kouba, Madi began his playing career with local side RC Kouba. In the summer of 2011, Madi was linked with a number of clubs including JS Kabylie, USM Alger and JSM Béjaïa. However, on July 13, 2011, Madi signed a two-year contract with newly promoted NA Hussein Dey. On September 10, 2011, Madi his official debut for the club as a starter in a league match against ES Sétif. Madi played sparingly during his first season with NA Hussein Dey under manager Chaâbane Merzekane, and asked to be released from his contract in April 2012.
