= Sofiane Bendebka =

Algerian footballer (born 1992)

Personal information
- Full name: Sofiane Bendebka
- Date of birth: 9 August 1992 (age 34)
- Place of birth: El Magharia, Algeria
- Height: 1.80 m (5 ft 11 in)
- Position: Midfielder

Team information
- Current team: Al-Hazem
- Number: 28

Youth career
- 2001–2011: NA Hussein Dey

Senior career*
Years	Team	Apps	(Gls)
2011–2017	NA Hussein Dey	128	(12)
2017–2020	MC Alger	62	(15)
2020–2026	Al-Fateh	181	(47)
2026–	Al-Hazem	11	(3)

International career^{‡}
2016	Algeria Olympic	7	(3)
2021–	Algeria A'	10	(1)
2016–2022	Algeria	18	(1)
Medal record
Men's football
Representing Algeria
FIFA Arab Cup
Winner	2021 Qatar
- * Club domestic league appearances and goals as of 22:35, 29 October 2026 (UTC) ‡ National team caps and goals as of 12 December 2025 (UTC)

Sofiane Bendebka (Arabic: سفيان بن دبكة; born 9 August 1992) is an Algerian footballer who plays as a midfielder.

== International career ==
On 2 June 2016, Bendebka made his senior international debut for Algeria in a 2017 Africa Cup of Nations qualifier against Seychelles, coming on as a 90th-minute substitute.

== Career statistics ==
=== International goals ===
Scores and results list Algeria's goal tally first.

No.	Date	Venue	Opponent	Score	Result	Competition
1.	18 August 2017	Stade Taïeb Mhiri, Sfax, Tunisia	Libya	1–0	1–1	2018 African Nations Championship qualification
2.	20 January 2022	Japoma Stadium, Douala, Cameroon	Ivory Coast	1–3	1–3	2021 Africa Cup of Nations

== Honours ==
Algeria

- FIFA Arab Cup: 2021
