= Belouizdad, Algiers =

Belouizdad بلوزداد ⴱⴻⵍⵡⴻⵣⴷⴰⴷ
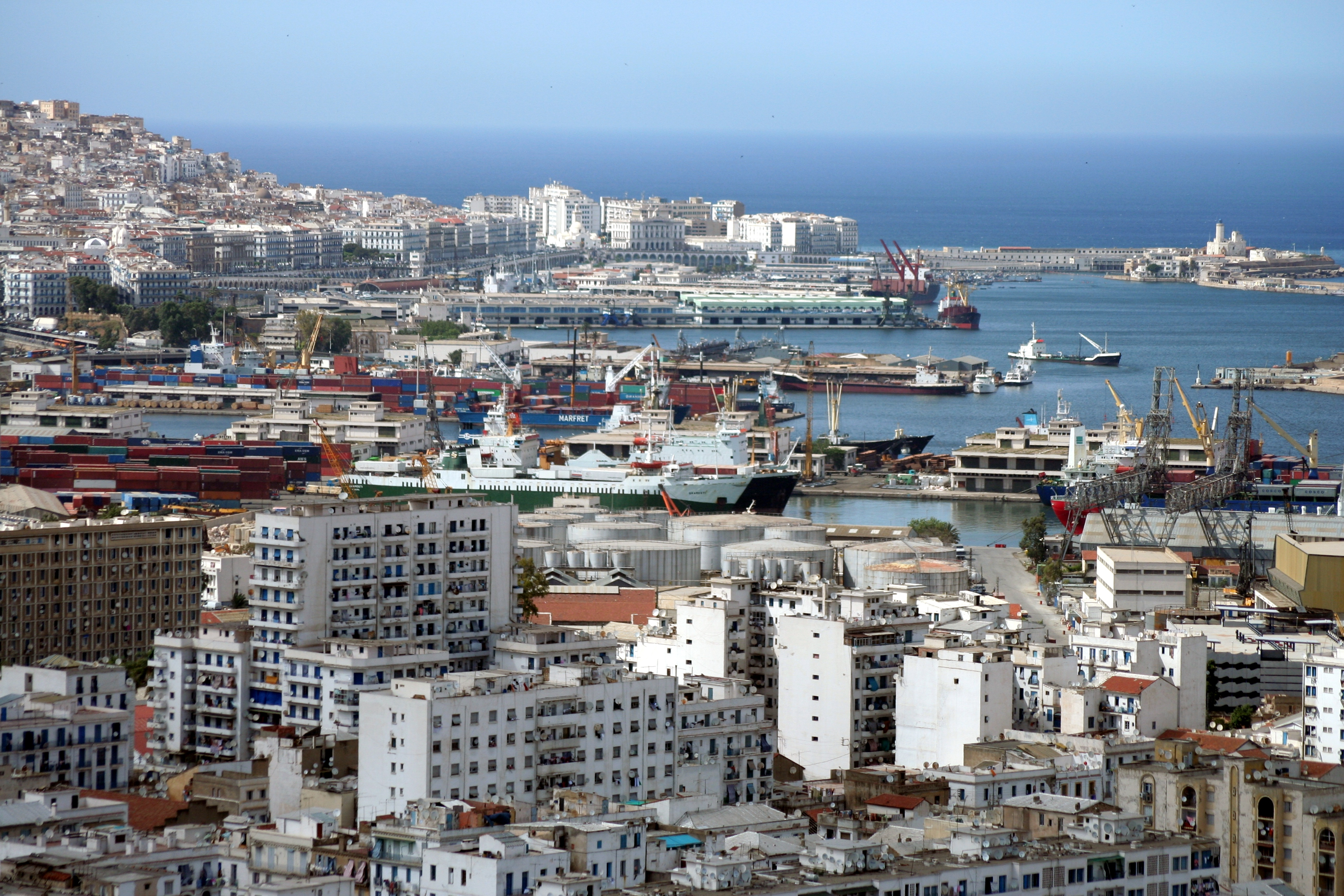

- Location within Algeria
- Coordinates: 36.753542°N 3.062278°E
- Country: Algeria
- Province: Algiers

Population (2008)
  - Total: 44,050
- Time zone: UTC+1 (West Africa Time)

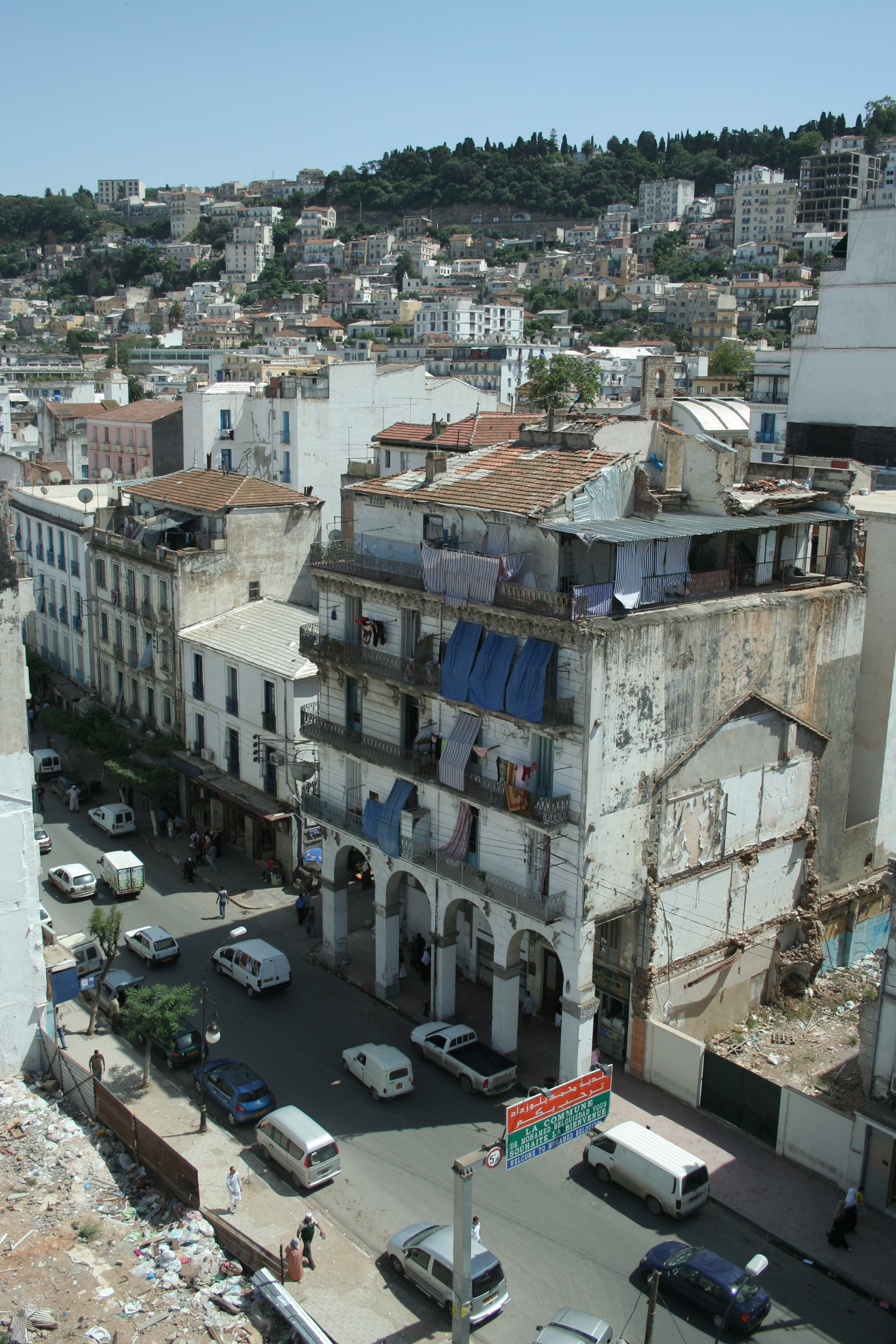
Belouizdad street, main hub of Belouizdad, Algiers

Mohamed Belouizdad (Arabic: بلوزداد) is a district of Algiers, Algeria in Algiers Province. The district was formerly known as Belcourt during the French colonisation period. It was renamed as Hamma-El Annasser (Arabic: الحامة-العناصر) after Algerian independence, before the present name Belouizdad was adopted in 1992 in honour of the Algerian militant and nationalist Mohamed Belouizdad who lived in the district.

Mohamed Belouizdad Street and Hassiba Ben Bouali Street are the two main arteries for the district that also has a seashore stretch on the Mediterranean coast. Important places in Belouizdad include the National Library of Algeria, the Botanical Garden Hamma (Arabic: حديقة التجارب, lit. 'The Test Garden', pronounced Hadiqat at Tajareb, or Jardin d'essai in French), the Hamoud Boualem soft drinks factory and headquarters, the August 20, 1955 Stadium (in French Stade 20 août 1955), as well as the Sofitel Algiers Hamma Garden hotel. The district also has a famous cave known as Cave Cervantes where the Spanish writer Miguel de Cervantes hid from the Turkish authorities but was recaptured when he famously attempted to flee back to Spain.

Belouizdad is served by 4 stations of the Algiers Metro, namely Jardin d'essai Station, Hamma Station in Belouizdad itself and Aïssat Idir Station and 1er Mai Station in the nearby Sidi M'Hamed municipality. The area is also served by two aerial tramway systems, the Téléphérique d'El Madania, inaugurated in 1956, and Téléphérique du Mémorial inaugurated in 1987 linking it to the Botanical Garden and the Martyrs' Memorial in Algiers that oversees the district. The intermodal Les Fusillés Station at the eastern border of Belouizdad connects to all points east on the Algiers tramway.

The district is also home to two football clubs, CR Belouizdad (Chabab Riadhi Belouizdad or just Belouizdad) and OMR El Annasser (Olympic Mostakbel Ruisseau El Annasser)

== Notable people ==
Known personalities from the area include:

- Sidi M'hamed Bou Qobrine, theologian and Sufi
- Mohamed Aïchaoui, journalist, militant activist, politician
- Mohamed Belouizdad, militant activist, politician
- Hocine Yahi, football player
- Biyouna, comedian
- Albert Camus, writer
- Boualem Sansal, writer
