= Rachid Nadji =

Algerian footballer (born 1988)

Personal information
- Full name: Rachid Nadji
- Date of birth: 15 April 1988 (age 38)
- Place of birth: Dellys, Algeria
- Height: 1.85 m (6 ft 1 in)
- Position: Striker

Team information
- Current team: MO Béjaïa
- Number: 26

Senior career*
Years	Team	Apps	(Gls)
2010–2011	NARB Réghaïa	-	(-)
2011–2014	ES Sétif	46	(19)
2014–2016	USM Alger	39	(10)
2016–2018	ES Sétif	31	(10)
2018–2020	MC Oran	16	(5)
2020–2022	NA Hussein Dey	36	(14)
2022	Al-Nahda	13	(5)
2022–2023	HB Chelghoum Laïd	5	(0)
2023–2025	CA Batna	0	(0)
2025–	MO Béjaïa	8	(3)
- * Club domestic league appearances and goals as of 8 September 2023

Rachid Nadji (Arabic: رشيد ناجي; born 15 April 1988) is an Algerian footballer who plays as a striker for MO Béjaïa.

== Career ==
In 2014, Nadji joined USM Alger. In 2016, he returned to ES Sétif. In 2018, Nadji signes a two-year contract with MC Oran. In 2020, he joined NA Hussein Dey. On 16 February 2022, Nadji joined Saudi Arabian club Al-Nahda. In September 2023, Nadji CA Batna.

== Honours ==
=== Club ===
ES Sétif

- Algerian Ligue Professionnelle 1 (3): 2011-12, 2012-13, 2016-17
- Algerian Cup (1): 2012

USM Alger

- Algerian Ligue Professionnelle 1 (1): 2015-16
