= 2017–18 Algerian Cup =

- Stade du 5 Juillet hosted the final

Tournament details
- Country: Algeria
- Dates: 28 December 2017 – 1 May 2018
- Teams: 64 (as of first national round)

Final positions
- Champions: USM Bel Abbès (2nd title)
- Runners-up: JS Kabylie

Tournament statistics
- Matches played: 63
- Goals scored: 125 (1.98 per match)
- Top goal scorer: Hadj Sadok (CR Zaouia) (5 goals)

The 2017–18 Algerian Cup (Arabic: كأس الجزائر 18-2017) was the 54th edition of the Algerian Cup. The winner qualified for the 2018–19 CAF Confederation Cup, The final was played in the July 5, 1962 Stadium. USM Bel Abbès were the eventual winners.

== Teams ==
Round	Clubs remaining	Clubs involved	Winners from previous round	New entries this round	Leagues entering at this round
Regional rounds
First round	-	-	-	-	Ligue de Football de la Wilaya; Ligue Régional II; Ligue Régional I Inter-Régions Division
Second round	-	-	-	-	none
Third round	192	-	-	-	Ligue Nationale du Football Amateur; Algerian Ligue Professionnelle 2
Fourth round	96	-	-	-	none
National rounds
Round of 64	64	64	48	16	Algerian Ligue Professionnelle 1
Round of 32	32	32	32	none	none
Round of 16	16	16	16	none	none
Quarter-finals	8	8	8	none	none
Semi-finals	4	4	4	none	none
Final	2	2	2	none	none

== Regional rounds ==
These are the results of the last regional rounds played on 25 November 2017.

=== Fourth regional round ===
==== Ligue Régionale de Football d'Alger ====
LRF Alger (Algiers) - Fourth regional round

25 November 2017	IB Lakhdaria (DNA)	1–0 (a.e.t.)	US Oued Amizour (DNA)	Azazga

25 November 2017	DRB Staoueli (Régional II)	1–1 (a.e.t.) (– p)	JS Hai Djebel (DNA)	Hydra

25 November 2017	AGS Belvedere (Régional II)	1–0	NARB Réghaïa (DNA)	Rouiba

25 November 2017	RC Kouba (Ligue 2)	1–0	USMD Ben Khedda (Régional I)	Réghaïa

25 November 2017	OS El Kseur (Régional II)	2–5	MO Béjaïa (Ligue 2)	Amizour

25 November 2017	Hydra AC (Inter-Régions)	0–2	E Sour El Ghozlane (Régional I)	Lakhdaria

25 November 2017	JS Azazga (Inter-Régions)	1–3	ES Ben Aknoun (DNA)	Bouira

25 November 2017	JSM Chéraga (Inter-Régions)	0–1	CRB Dar El Beïda (DNA)	Bourouba

==== Ligue Régionale de Football d'Oran ====
LRF Oran - Fourth regional round

25 November 2017	IRB Maghnia (DNA)	0–1	WA Tlemcen (Ligue 2)	Remchi

25 November 2017	RCB Oued Rhiou (DNA)	3–0	WR Sebdou (Régional II)	Oran
				Stadium: Lahouari Benahmed Stadium

25 November 2017	ASM Oran (Ligue 2)	1–0	OM Arzew (DNA)	Sidi Chami

25 November 2017	RC Relizane (Ligue 2)	3–2 (a.e.t.)	ES Mostaganem (DNA)	Oran
				Stadium: Ahmed Zabana Stadium

25 November 2017	WB Ouled Mimoun (Régional I)	2–0	CR Bendaoud (Régional I)	Sidi Brahim

25 November 2017	CRB Ouarizane (Régional II)	0–1	CRB El Amria (Régional I)	Arzew

25 November 2017	CR Témouchent (Inter-Régions)	3–1	C Ouled Boudjemaa (Régional II)	El Amria

==== Ligue Régionale de Football de Saïda ====
LRF Saïda - Fourth regional round

25 November 2017	MC Saïda (Ligue 2)	2–1	FCB Ouled Brahim (Régional I)	Saïda

25 November 2017	JSM Tiaret (Inter-Régions)	1–1 (a.e.t.) (– p)	SA Mohammadia (DNA)	Tighenif

25 November 2017	MCE Bayadh (Régional I)	2–1	GC Mascara (Ligue 2)	Sougueur

25 November 2017	MB Hassasna (DNA)	2–0	IRB Larjam (Régional I)	Frenda

25 November 2017	ARB Ghriss (Inter-Régions)	2–1	CC Sig (Inter-Régions)	Mascara

==== Ligue Régionale de Football de Ouargla ====
LRF Ouargla - Fourth regional round

25 November 2017	NRT Mermad (Régional II)	0–2	CSSW Illizi (Régional I)	Ghardaïa

25 November 2017	NRN Boughoufala (Régional II)	2–2 (a.e.t.) (– p)	MB Hassi Messaoud (Inter-Régions)	Aïn Beïda

25 November 2017	NRB Touggourt (DNA)	3–0	IRB Robbah (Inter-Régions)	Touggourt

25 November 2017	US Souf (Inter-Régions)	2–1	IRB Aflou (Inter-Régions)	Tikesbet

==== Ligue Régionale de Football de Blida ====
LRF Blida - Fourth regional round

25 November 2017	CR Zaouia (Régional I)	6–3	RA Aïn Defla (Inter-Régions)	Boumedfaâ

25 November 2017	SKAF El-Khemis (DNA)	1–3	ES Firm (Wilaya)	Rouina

25 November 2017	ESM Koléa (DNA)	2–0	CRB Aïn Oussera (DNA)	Beni Slimane

25 November 2017	CRB Sendjas (DNA)	4–4 (– p)	USMM Hadjout (DNA)	Aïn Defla

25 November 2017	ASO Chlef (Ligue 2)	2–2 (– p)	MCB Oued Sly (Inter-Régions)	Chlef

==== Ligue Régionale de Football d'Annaba ====
LRF Annaba - Fourth regional round

25 November 2017	ESB Besbès (Inter-Régions)	0–0 (a.e.t.) (– p)	ORB Boumahra Ahmed (Inter-Régions)	El Hadjar

25 November 2017	US Tébessa (DNA)	1–2	MB Berrahal (Régional I)	Oued Zenati

25 November 2017	IRB El Hadjar (Inter-Régions)	1–1 (a.e.t.) (– p)	ESF Bir El Ater (Régional II)	Sedrata

25 November 2017	USM Annaba (DNA)	2–1	CRB Heliopolis (Régional I)	Souk Ahras

25 November 2017	Hamra Annaba (DNA)	1–1 (a.e.t.) (– p)	IRB Belkheir (Régional I)	Dréan

==== Ligue Régionale de Football de Constantine ====
LRF Constantine - Fourth regional round

25 November 2017	JS Djijel (DNA)	0–0 (a.e.t.) (– p)	CR Village Moussa (DNA)	Jijel

25 November 2017	MC El Eulma (Ligue 2)	3–1	IRB Aïn Lahdjar (Inter-Régions)	Sétif

25 November 2017	JSM Skikda (Ligue 2)	0–0 (a.e.t.) (– p)	USM Sétif (Inter-Régions)	Mila

25 November 2017	AB Chelghoum Laïd (DNA)	0–2	AS Aïn M'lila (Ligue 2)	Smara

25 November 2017	CRB Aïn Fakroun (Ligue 2)	0–1	NRB Teleghma (Inter-Régions)	Aïn M'lila

25 November 2017	HB Chelghoum Laïd (DNA)	4–3	USE Milia (Régional I)	Grarem

25 November 2017	USM Aïn Beïda (DNA)	1–3	SA Sétif (Inter-Régions)	Didouche Mourad

==== Ligue Régionale de Football de Batna ====
LRF Batna - Fourth regional round

25 November 2017	CA Bordj Bou Arréridj (Ligue 2)	4–0	CR Bordj Ghedir (Inter-Régions)	Ras El Oued

25 November 2017	NRC Boudjelbana (Inter-Régions)	1–0	CRB Ouled Djellal (Inter-Régions)	Merouana

25 November 2017	USM Khenchela (DNA)	2–1	CA Batna (Ligue 2)	Chemora

25 November 2017	A Bou Saâda (Ligue 2)	3–2	IRB Khelil (Régional II)	M’Sila

25 November 2017	MB Barika (Régional II)	1–2	NC Magra (DNA)	Ras El Oued

25 November 2017	CRB Kaïs (DNA)	bye

==== Region of Béchar ====
Region of Béchar - Fourth regional round

25 November 2017	CRB Adrar (Inter-Régions)	0–1	CG Aïn Séfra (Régional)	Béchar

== National rounds ==
=== Round of 64 ===
The Round of 64 draw took place on 5 December and was broadcast live on Algérie 3 at 18:00 local time. All 32 Round of 64 ties are due to be played on the weekend of 29 December. 48 teams from the qualifying competition join the 16 teams from Ligue Professionnelle 1 to compete in this round. The round includes one team from Level 7 still in the competition, US Firme, who are the lowest-ranked team in this round from the city of Chlef and his second participation in this round after the first season 1996–97. Twenty-one years later, US Firme will meet against USM Alger one more time, This round will see one match between two teams from Ligue Professionnelle 1, CS Constantine against NA Hussein Dey.

28 December 2017	MC Oran	1–0	MCB Oued Sly	Oran
17:00	Tiaïba 63'	Report; Live TV: Canal Algérie / EPTV Terrestre		Stadium: Ahmed Zabana Stadium; Referee: Malik Aït Ameur

28 December 2017	JS Kabylie	1–0	ES Ben Aknoun	Tizi Ouzou
17:00	Benaldjia 8'	Report; Live TV: TV Tamazight 4		Stadium: November 1, 1954 Stadium; Referee: Nader, Oumari, Sarradj

29 December 2017	CR Témouchent	0–0 (a.e.t.) (4–5 p)	USM Blida	Aïn Témouchent
14:30		Report; Live TV: None		Stadium: Omar Oucief Stadium; Referee: Fassih, Omri, Sifoune
	Penalties
	? (penalty scored) ? (penalty scored) ? (penalty scored) ? (penalty scored); Brahim (penalty missed)		(penalty scored) Samy Frioui; (penalty scored) Youcef El-Houari; (penalty scored) Billel Herbache; (penalty scored) Abdou Taieb-Solimane; (penalty scored) El Hadi Belaïd

29 December 2017	AS Aïn M'lila	1–0	CA Bordj Bou Arréridj	El Khroub
14:30	Attia 60'	Report; Live TV: None		Stadium: Abed Hamdani Stadium; Referee: Lyés Bekouassa

29 December 2017	ESB Besbès	1–1 (a.e.t.) (4–3 p)	US Souf	Annaba
14:30	Belami 107'	Report; Live TV: None	115' Hadj Said	Stadium: Colonel Chabou Abdelkader Stadium; Attendance: Medium; Referee: Bouchama, Bourahla, Chahoud

29 December 2017	DRB Tadjenanet	3–0	CRB El Amria	Tadjenanet
14:30	Dousse 4'; Hoggas 87'; Cherif 90+1'	Report; Live TV: None		Stadium: Lahoua Smaïl Stadium; Referee: Dokhani, Dilmi, Etchellali

29 December 2017	MC El Eulma	0–3	Paradou AC	El Eulma
14:30		Report; Live TV: None	17' Benayad; 57' Naïdji; 76' Bouzouk	Stadium: Stade Messaoud Zougar; Referee: Nabil Boukhalfa

29 December 2017	ESM Koléa	1–3	MO Béjaïa	Blida
14:30	Karouchen 87'	Report; Live TV: None	6' Mohli; 73' Herida; 90+3' Belkacemi	Stadium: Brakni Brothers Stadium; Referee: Bendjehane, Bensnouci, Ouera

29 December 2017	NRC Boudjelbana	1–2 (a.e.t.)	CRB Dar El Beïda	Tébessa
14:30	Boufana 50'	Report; Live TV: None	42'Chettab; 120' Benallal	Stadium: March 4, 1956 Stadium; Referee: Batouche, Guessoum, Boudebouz

29 December 2017	ES Sétif	2–0	MB Hassi Messaoud	Sétif
15:00	Nessakh 33'; Chibane 81'	Report; Live TV: None		Stadium: Stade 8 Mai 1945; Referee: Bouteraa, Hallal, Halam

29 December 2017	USM Bel Abbès	0–0 (a.e.t.) (3–1 p)	HB Chelghoum Laïd	Sidi Bel Abbès
15:00		Report; Live TV: None		Stadium: Stade 24 Fevrier 1956; Referee: Hamza Bouslimani

29 December 2017	DRB Staoueli	0–2	Olympique de Médéa	Belouizdad
15:00		Report; Live TV: EPTV Terrestre / Algérie 3	26' Boubekeur Islam; 74' Boucherit	Stadium: August 20, 1955 Stadium; Referee: Boucetta, Asklou, Flidja

29 December 2017	USM Alger	1–0	US Firme	Bologhine
16:00	Meftah 45+2'	Report; Live TV: None		Stadium: Omar Hamadi Stadium; Referee: Ahmed Bouzrar

29 December 2017	CS Constantine	2–1	NA Hussein Dey	Constantine
16:00	Belkheir 79' (pen.); Zerara 85' (pen.)	Report; Live TV: Canal Algérie / TV Tamazight 4	9' Khiat	Stadium: Stade Mohamed Hamlaoui; Referee: Mustapha Ghorbal

30 December 2017	IRB Belkheir	2–0	WB Ouled Mimoun	Guelma
14:00	Brahmia 42'; Boubaker Yousefi 42'; Benabda (red card) 57'	Report; Live TV: None		Stadium: Stade Souidani Boujemaa; Attendance: Medium; Referee: Messagier, Bouzid, Zemit

30 December 2017	MC Saïda	4–0	RC Kouba	Saïda
14:00	Amara 7'; Amour 75'; Ahmed Kadous 81', 88'	Report; Live TV: Canal Algérie		Stadium: April 13, 1958 Stadium; Referee: Lahlou Benbraham

30 December 2017	CSSW Illizi	2–1	ESF Bir El Ater	Illizi
14:00	Benomar 33'; Houa 49'	[ Report] Live TV: None	28' Saidi; Azizi (red card) 50'	Stadium: Complexe olympique d'Illizi; Referee: Benatia, Bazine, Mougar

30 December 2017	US Biskra	3–0	JSM Skikda	Biskra
14:00	El Okbi 2'; Farhi 40'; Berbache 57'	Report; Live TV: None		Stadium: El Alia Sports Complex; Referee: Boubekeur Zouaoui

30 December 2017	RC Relizane	2–2 (a.e.t.) (7–8 p)	NRB Teleghma	Relizane
14:00	Bilel Bouzid 46'; Rabah Aich 59' (pen.)	Report; Live TV: None	10' Kermichi; 22' (pen.) Dakhmouche	Stadium: Stade Tahar Zoughari; Attendance: Medium; Referee: Oudina, Sadok, Laribi

30 December 2017	NRB Touggourt	0–0 (a.e.t.) (2–4 p)	USM El Harrach	Touggourt
14:00		Report; Live TV: None		Stadium: Mohamed Chabani Stadium; Referee: Bahloul, Saâdi, Benamia

30 December 2017	MCE Bayadh	1–0	USM Annaba	El Bayadh
14:00	Guendouzi 61'	Report; Live TV: None		Stadium: Madjdoub-Zakaria Stadium; Attendance: record Referee: Yahia, Benaâda, Saber

30 December 2017	NC Magra	1–0	USM Khenchela	M'Sila
14:00	Harizi 39'	Report; Live TV: None		Stadium: Chahid Ouartal El Bachir Stadium; Attendance: record Referee: Maâskri, Zerrouki, Hadji

30 December 2017	IB Lakhdaria	1–0	AGS Belvedere	Boumerdès
14:00	Abdelghani Boumriche 60'	Report; Live TV: None	Bouteraâ (red card) 71'	Stadium: Stade olympique Bounaama de Boumerdès; Referee: Meziani, Tamrabet, Benhacen

30 December 2017	CRB Kaïs	2–1	CR Village Moussa	Tébessa
14:00	Chamseddine Makhloula 42'; Sahnoune 64'; Makhloula (red card) 64'	Report; Live TV: None	27' Imed Gasmi	Stadium: March 4, 1956 Stadium; Referee: Ladraa, Rouag, Rih

30 December 2017	SA Mohammadia	1–2	JS Saoura	Sidi Bel Abbès
14:00	Yachdir Faycal 88' (pen.)	Report; Live TV: None	42' Bourdim; 66' Zaidi	Stadium: Stade 24 Fevrier 1956; Referee: Abderrazek Hallalchi

30 December 2017	CR Zaouia	1–1 (a.e.t.) (5–4 p)	E Sour El Ghozlane	Blida
14:00	Hadj Sadouk 28'	Report; Live TV: None	3' Ziani	Stadium: Brakni Brothers Stadium; Referee: Choubini, Maghlout, Bahloul

30 December 2017	CG Aïn Séfra	0–1	A Bou Saâda	Aïn Séfra
14:00		Report; Live TV: None	47' Mohamed El Siddik Baali	Stadium: Mohamed Arfaoui Stadium; Attendance: record Referee: Missoum Benabdellah, Berchou, Mesbah

30 December 2017	CR Belouizdad	3–0	ARB Ghriss	Belouizdad
15:00	Lakroum 20'; Lamhene 53'; Aribi 63'	Report; Live TV: None		Stadium: August 20, 1955 Stadium; Referee: Ibrir, Tamen, Benhamouda

30 December 2017	SA Sétif	0–2	ASM Oran	Sétif
15:00		Report; Live TV: TV Tamazight 4	13' Hicham Khalfallah; 42' Fayçal Hadji	Stadium: Stade 8 Mai 1945; Referee: Benyahia, Hamlaoui, Himri

30 December 2017	MC Alger	4–0	WA Tlemcen	Algiers
16:00	Souibaâh 18'; Nekkache 35', 90+3'; Balegh 45+1'	Report; Live TV: Algérie 3		Stadium: July 5, 1962 Stadium; Referee: Abderrezzak Arab

1 January 2017	USMM Hadjout	1–2 (a.e.t.)	RCB Oued Rhiou	Blida
14:00	Meddah Kaddour 17'	Report; Live TV: None	90+3' Amine Guecioueur; 119' Abdelmalek Haloui	Stadium: Brakni Brothers Stadium; Referee: Meghizi, Hamza, Irem

2 January 2017	MB Hassasna	3 - 0	MB Berrahal	Saïda
14:00	Smail Labidine 28'; Chouikhi Mourad 71'; Aibout Djilali 90+4'	Report; Live TV: None		Stadium: April 13, 1958 Stadium; Referee: Kasmi, Badache.K, Tizizoua

=== Round of 32 ===
11 January 2018	CRB Dar El Beïda	1 – 0	ESB Besbès	Dar El Beïda
14:30	Chettab 88'	Report; Live TV: Canal Algérie		Stadium: Stade Omar Benrabah

12 January 2018	DRB Tadjenanet	2 – 1	MC Saïda	Tadjenanet
14:45	Hoggas 10'; Aïb 83'	Report; Live TV: EPTV Terrestre / Canal Algérie	40' Yacine Guenina	Stadium: Lahoua Smaïl Stadium; Referee: Brahim, Boulkrinat, Badache

12 January 2018	IRB Belkheir	0 – 0 (a.e.t.) (7 – 6 p)	Olympique de Médéa	Guelma
14:45		Report; Live TV: None		Stadium: Stade Souidani Boujemaa
	Penalties
	(penalty scored) (penalty scored); Benabda (penalty scored); Brahmia (penalty scored) (penalty scored) (penalty scored) (penalty scored)		(penalty scored) Koulkhir; (penalty scored) Izmani; (penalty scored) Bouchrit (penalty scored); (penalty scored) Bouchiba; (penalty scored) Belkhir; (penalty missed) Benamar

12 January 2018	AS Aïn M'lila	0 – 0 (a.e.t.) (3 – 0 p)	IB Lakhdaria	El Khroub
14:45		Report; Live TV: None		Stadium: Abed Hamdani Stadium; Referee: Saouadji, Bourouchou, Mesbah
	Penalties
	Penalty scored		Penalty missed

12 January 2018	MB Hassasna	1 – 2 (a.e.t.)	MO Béjaïa	Saida
14:45	Mourad Chouikhi 81'; Mourad Chouikhi (penalty missed) 90'	Report; Live TV: None	16' Mohamed Cherif; 103' Amir Soltane	Stadium: April 13, 1958 Stadium; Referee: Gamouh, Benchabia, Mokrane

12 January 2018	MC El Bayadh	1 – 1 (a.e.t.) (4 – 2 p)	Paradou AC	El Bayadh
14:45	Touar 120'	Report; Live TV: None	112' Benayad	Stadium: Madjdoub Zakaria Stadium
	Penalties
	? (penalty scored); Bousmaha (penalty scored); Amine Antar (penalty scored) (penalty scored)		(penalty missed); (penalty scored) Bouchina; (penalty scored) Benayad (penalty missed)

12 January 2018	CR Zaouia	1 – 0	NC Magra	Blida
14:45	Hadj Sadouk 57'	Report; Live TV: None		Stadium: Brakni Brothers Stadium; Attendance: 2500; Referee: Azaz, Guaci, Boukeul

12 January 2018	CR Belouizdad	2 – 0	CSSW Illizi	Belouizdad
15:00	Draoui 28'; Khoudi 57'	Report; Live TV: Algérie 3		Stadium: Stade 20 Août 1955; Referee: Benhamou A., Arrafa, Benhamou M.

13 January 2018	CRB Kaïs	0 – 2	USM Bel Abbès	El Khroub
14:00		Report; Live TV: None	14' Zouari; 41' Bouguelmouna	Stadium: Abed Hamdani Stadium; Referee: Boubekeur Zouaoui

13 January 2018	A Bou Saâda	0 – 1	MC Alger	Bou Saâda
14:00		Report; Live TV: None	71' Nekkache	Stadium: Stade Mokhtar Abdelatif; Referee: Merzoug Brahimi

13 January 2018	USM Blida	2 – 0	ASM Oran	Blida
14:00	Frioui 75'; Belhadj 90+3'	Report; Live TV: None		Stadium: Brakni Brothers Stadium; Referee: Abderrezzak Arab, Baiod, Benacer

13 January 2018	US Biskra	1 – 0	USM El Harrach	Biskra
14:00	Yokkoub Anani 40'	Report; Live TV: None		Stadium: El Alia Sports Complex; Referee: Mohamed Saïdi

13 January 2018	NRB Teleghma	0 – 1	MC Oran	Mila
14:00		Report; Live TV: None	73' Toumi	Stadium: Belkacem Belaïd Stadium; Referee: Ibrir, Chelali, Benaceur

13 January 2018	JS Kabylie	2 – 0	RCB Oued Rhiou	Tizi Ouzou
16:00	Benyoucef 6'; Benaldjia 42'	Report; Live TV: None		Stadium: November 1, 1954 Stadium; Referee: Brahimi A., Tamen, Boulfelfel

15 January 2018	JS Saoura	1 – 0	ES Sétif	Béchar
17:00	Bourdim 90+1' (pen.)	Report; Live TV: None		Stadium: Stade 20 Août 1955; Referee: Lahlou Benbraham

16 January 2018	USM Alger	1 – 0	CS Constantine	Bologhine
16:00	Sayoud 60'	Report; Live TV: EPTV Terrestre / Canal Algérie		Stadium: Omar Hamadi Stadium; Referee: Farouk Mial

=== Round of 16 ===
1 February 2018	MC Alger	2–1 (a.e.t.)	CR Belouizdad	Algiers
17:00	Derrardja 40', 98' (pen.)	Report; Live TV: Canal Algérie	20' Sidibe	Stadium: July 5, 1962 Stadium; Referee: Said Aouina

2 February 2018	CRB Dar El Beïda	0–1	JS Kabylie	Dar El Beïda
14:30		Report; Live TV: Algérie 3	48' Yettou	Stadium: Stade Omar Benrabah; Referee: Redouane Necib

2 February 2018	JS Saoura	1–0	USM Alger	Béchar
17:00	Yahia-Chérif 81'	Report; Live TV: EPTV Terrestre / TV Tamazight 4		Stadium: Stade 20 Août 1955; Referee: Farouk Mial

3 February 2018	AS Aïn M'lila	1–0	MC El Bayadh	El Khroub
14:30	Chouaib Dhebih 85' (pen.)	[ Report] Live TV: None		Stadium: Abed Hamdani Stadium; Referee: Benchehida

3 February 2018	IRB Belkheir	0–3	CR Zaouia	Guelma
14:30		[ Report] Live TV: Algérie 3	Arif Djebbar 24'; Hadj Sadouk 25', 74'	Stadium: Stade Souidani Boujemaa; Referee: Oukil

3 February 2018	USM Blida	5–0	DRB Tadjenanet	Blida
14:30	Billal Herbache 4'; Ibrahim Si-Amar 25', 54', 64'; Samy Frioui 46' (pen.)	[ Report] Live TV: None		Stadium: Brakni Brothers Stadium; Referee: Mustapha Bessiri

3 February 2018	MO Béjaïa	1–0	MC Oran	Béjaïa
16:00	Yacine Salhi 81'	[ Report] Live TV: TV Tamazight 4		Stadium: Maghrebi Unity Stadium; Referee: Lotfi Bekouassa

3 February 2018	USM Bel Abbès	2–1	US Biskra	Sidi Bel Abbès
16:00	Zakaria Khali 7'; Fares Benabderahmane 71'	[ Report] Live TV: EPTV Terrestre	47' Dadi El Hocine Mouaki	Stadium: Stade 24 Fevrier 1956; Referee: Farid Bahloul

=== Quarter-finals ===
2 March 2018	MC Alger	2 – 0	MO Béjaïa	Algiers
17:00	Azzi 22'; Mebarakou 76'	Report; Live TV: TV Tamazight 4 / Canal Algérie		Stadium: July 5, 1962 Stadium; Referee: Mehdi Abid Charef

2 March 2018	CR Zaouia	2 – 1	AS Aïn M'lila	Blida
16:00	Arfa 45+3'; Hadj Sadok 92'	Report; Live TV: EPTV Terrestre	45' (pen.) Benaroussi	Stadium: Mustapha Tchaker Stadium; Referee: Farouk Mial

3 March 2018	USM Bel Abbès	2 – 1	JS Saoura	Sidi Bel Abbès
16:00	Seguer 61'; Belahouel 86'	Report; Live TV: Algérie 3	28' Yahia-Chérif	Stadium: February 24, 1956 Stadium; Referee: Said Aouina

24 March 2018	JS Kabylie	2 – 1	USM Blida	Algiers
16:00	Benyoucef 71'; Radouani 82'	Report; Live TV: Canal Algérie / Algérie 3	90+4' Herbache	Stadium: July 5, 1962 Stadium; Referee: Abderrezzak Arab

=== Semi-finals ===
13 April 2018	JS Kabylie	0–0 (a.e.t.) (6–5 p)	MC Alger	Constantine
16:00		Report; Live TV: Algerian TV / Algeria 4 / Al-Kass One		Stadium: Stade Mohamed Hamlaoui; Attendance: 45,000; Referee: Said Aouina
	Penalties
	Boukhenchouche (penalty scored); Benyoucef (penalty scored); Raiah (penalty scored); Saâdou (penalty missed); Djabout (penalty scored); Benaldjia (penalty scored)		(penalty scored) Derrardja; (penalty missed) Hachoud; (penalty scored) Bendebka; (penalty scored) Azzi; (penalty scored) Souibaâh; (penalty missed) Ammachi

14 April 2018	USM Bel Abbès	1–0	CR Zaouia	Sidi Bel Abbès
16:00	Tabti 90+3'	Report; Live TV: Canal Algérie / Algérie 3		Stadium: 24 February Stadium; Attendance: 35,000; Referee: Redouane Necib

=== Final ===
May 1, 2018
16:00

JS Kabylie	1 - 2	USM Bel Abbès
Djerrar 56'	Report	Belahouel 2', 49'

Stade 5 Juillet 1962, Algiers
Attendance: 55,000
Referee: Mehdi Abid Charef
