= 2017–18 DRB Tadjenanet season =

DRB Tadjenanet
2017–18 season
- Chairman: Tahar Garaich
- Head coach: François Bracci (from August 2017) (until 29 August 2017); Kamel Mouassa (from 4 September 2017) (until 27 October 2017); Omar Belatoui (from 5 November 2017) (until 27 January 2018); Hammadi Daou (from 1 February 2018)
- Stadium: Lahoua Smaïl Stadium, Tadjenanet
- Ligue 1: 9th
- Algerian Cup: Round of 16
- Top goalscorer: League: Mohamed El Amine Belmokhtar (7); All: Mohamed El Amine Belmokhtar (7); Kodjo Dousse (7)

In the 2017–18 season, DRB Tadjenanet is competing in the Ligue 1 for the 3rd season, as well as the Algerian Cup.

== Non-competitive ==
=== Overview ===
Competition	Record								Started round	Final position / round	First match	Last match
Competition	G	W	D	L	GF	GA	GD	Win %	Started round	Final position / round	First match	Last match
Ligue 1	30	10	7	13	33	41	−8	33.33	—N/a	9th	26 August 2017	19 May 2018
Algerian Cup	3	2	0	1	5	6	−1	66.67	Round of 64	Round of 16	29 December 2017	3 February 2018
Total	33	12	7	14	38	47	−9	36.36				

Updated to match played 19 May 2018
Source: Competitions

== League table ==
Pos	Team	Pld	W	D	L	GF	GA	GD	Pts	Qualification or relegation
7	Paradou AC	30	12	6	12	35	30	+5	42 (Note: Ranked on head-to-head results.)	
8	ES Sétif	30	10	10	10	35	30	+5	40	Qualification for 2018–19 Arab Club Champions Cup
9	DRB Tadjenanet	30	10	7	13	33	41	−8	37 (Note: Ranked on head-to-head results.)	
10	USM Bel Abbès (Note: USM Bel Abbès were deducted 6 points. FIFA's decision was taken at its meeting on 9 June 2017, ordering the club to pay the amount due to the player Jessy Mayele as well as a fine of CHF 15,000 (15,000 Swiss francs).)	30	12	7	11	32	31	+1	37	Qualification for the 2018–19 Confederation Cup
11	JS Kabylie	30	8	12	10	34	39	−5	36 (Note: Ranked on head-to-head results.)	

Updated to match(es) played on 19 May 2018. Source: DZFoot
Rules for classification: 1) points; 2) head-to-head points; 3) head-to-head goal difference; 4) goal difference; 5) total goals; 6) fairplay ranking; 7) playoff.

=== Results summary ===
Overall								Home						Away					
Pld	W	D	L	GF	GA	GD	Pts	W	D	L	GF	GA	GD	W	D	L	GF	GA	GD
30	10	7	13	33	41	−8	37	8	4	3	20	13	+7	2	3	10	13	28	−15

Last updated: 15 June 2018.
Source: Competitive matches

=== Results by round ===
Round	1	2	3	4	5	6	7	8	9	10	11	12	13	14	15	16	17	18	19	20	21	22	23	24	25	26	27	28	29	30
Ground	A	H	A	H	A	H	A	H	A	A	H	A	H	A	H	H	A	H	A	H	A	H	A	H	H	A	H	A	H	A
Result	D	W	D	L	L	W	L	D	L	D	D	L	W	L	W	D	L	L	L	W	L	L	L	W	W	W	D	L	W	W
Position	7	4	6	9	11	8	10	11	13	13	13	13	12	13	11	10	10	13	14	13	14	15	15	14	13	11	12	13	12	9

Updated to match(es) played on 15 June 2018. Source: Competitive matches
A = Away; H = Home; W = Win; D = Draw; L = Loss

=== Matches ===
Win Draw Loss

25 August 2017 Round 1	Olympique de Médéa	1–1	DRB Tadjenanet	Médéa
17:00	Bahi 38'	Soccerway report Live TV: None	50' Attouche	Stadium: Stade Imam Lyes de Médéa; Referee: Merzak Halalchi

8 September 2017 Round 2	DRB Tadjenanet	2–1	CS Constantine	Tadjenanet
17:00	Attouche 31'; Belmokhtar 34'	Soccerway report Live TV: EPTV Terrestre / TV Tamazight 4	41' Sylla	Stadium: Lahoua Smaïl Stadium; Referee: Mustapha Ghorbal

11 September 2017 Round 3	USM Alger	1–1	DRB Tadjenanet	Bologhine
17:45	Darfalou 79'	Soccerway report Live TV: TV Tamazight 4	17' Attouche	Stadium: Omar Hamadi Stadium; Referee: Lahlou Benbraham

22 September 2017 Round 4	DRB Tadjenanet	0–1	MC Oran	Tadjenanet
16:00		Soccerway report Live TV: Canal Algérie	90+1' Frifer	Stadium: Lahoua Smaïl Stadium; Referee: Lyés Bekouassa

30 September 2017 Round 5	JS Kabylie	1–0	DRB Tadjenanet	Tizi Ouzou
17:00	Tafni 77'	Soccerway report Live TV: Canal Algérie		Stadium: November 1, 1954 Stadium; Referee: Mustapha Bessiri

12 October 2017 Round 6	DRB Tadjenanet	1–0	USM Blida	Tadjenanet
16:00	Hadded 43'	Soccerway report Live TV: None		Stadium: Lahoua Smaïl Stadium; Referee: Amine Hansal

16 October 2017 Round 7	Paradou AC	1–0	DRB Tadjenanet	Bologhine
17:00	Naidji 60'	Soccerway report Live TV: TV Tamazight 4		Stadium: Omar Hamadi Stadium; Referee: Mohamed Saïdi

21 October 2017 Round 8	DRB Tadjenanet	1–1	NA Hussein Dey	Tadjenanet
15:00	Belmokhtar 90+5'	Soccerway report Live TV: None	58' Chouiter	Stadium: Lahoua Smaïl Stadium; Referee: Missoum Benabdellah

28 October 2017 Round 9	JS Saoura	4–2	DRB Tadjenanet	Béchar
18:00	Djallit 8' (pen.), 28' (pen.), 51'; Bourdim 84'	Soccerway report Live TV: None	3' Demane; 90' (o.g.) Madani	Stadium: Stade 20 Août 1955; Referee: Mustapha Ghorbal

3 November 2017 Round 10	USM Bel-Abbès	1–1	DRB Tadjenanet	Sidi Bel Abbès
15:00	Bouguelmouna 10'	Soccerway report Live TV: EPTV Terrestre / Canal Algérie	31' Attouche	Stadium: Stade 24 Fevrier 1956; Referee: Lyés Bekouassa

11 November 2017 Round 11	DRB Tadjenanet	1–1	USM El Harrach	Tadjenanet
15:00	Hadded 70'	report Live TV: None	52' Banouh	Stadium: Lahoua Smaïl Stadium; Referee: Abderrezzak Arab

17 November 2017 Round 12	MC Alger	2–1	DRB Tadjenanet	Bologhine
17:00	Hachoud 11' (pen.); Boudebouda 64'	Soccerway report Live TV: TV Tamazight 4	49' Dousse	Stadium: Omar Hamadi Stadium; Referee: Lahlou Benbraham

1 December 2017 Round 13	DRB Tadjenanet	3–1	US Biskra	Tadjenanet
16:00	Demane 36', 61'; Khaled 45+1'	Soccerway report Live TV: None	30' Rachedi	Stadium: Lahoua Smaïl Stadium; Referee: Hamza Bouslimani

8 December 2017 Round 14	ES Sétif	2–0	DRB Tadjenanet	Sétif
17:00	Benayad 5'; Rebiai 37'	Soccerway report Live TV: None		Stadium: Stade 8 Mai 1945; Referee: Merzak Halalchi

15 December 2017 Round 15	DRB Tadjenanet	3–0	CR Belouizdad	Tadjenanet
15:00	Khaled 10'; Dousse 79'; Belmokhtar 89'	Soccerway report Live TV: EPTV Terrestre / TV Tamazight 4		Stadium: Lahoua Smaïl Stadium; Referee: Mustapha Ghorbal

5 January 2018 Round 16	DRB Tadjenanet	0–0	Olympique de Médéa	Tadjenanet
15:00		Soccerway report Live TV: Algérie 3		Stadium: Lahoua Smaïl Stadium; Referee: Missoum Benabdellah

20 January 2018 Round 17	CS Constantine	2–1	DRB Tadjenanet	Constantine
16:00	Abid 20'; Zerara 88'	Soccerway report Live TV: EPTV Terrestre	72' (pen.) Dousse	Stadium: Stade Mohamed Hamlaoui; Referee: Abderrazek Hallalchi

27 January 2018 Round 18	DRB Tadjenanet	0–3	USM Alger	Tadjenanet
15:00		Soccerway report Live TV: Algérie 3	23', 38' Yaya; 26' Darfalou	Stadium: Lahoua Smaïl Stadium; Referee: Mohamed Saïdi

10 February 2018 Round 19	MC Oran	3–2	DRB Tadjenanet	Oran
16:00	Chibane 38', 61'; Gharbi 83'	Soccerway report Live TV: Algérie 3 / Canal Algérie	42' (pen.) Maroci; 80' Belmokhtar	Stadium: Ahmed Zabana Stadium; Referee: Amine Hansal

16 February 2018 Round 20	DRB Tadjenanet	1–0	JS Kabylie	Tadjenanet
16:00	Hadded 52'	Soccerway report Live TV: EPTV Terrestre		Stadium: Lahoua Smaïl Stadium; Referee: Nabil Boukhalfa

24 February 2018 Round 21	USM Blida	1–0	DRB Tadjenanet	Blida
16:00	Frioui 3'	Soccerway report Live TV: None		Stadium: Brakni Brothers Stadium; Referee: Said Aouina

10 March 2018 Round 22	DRB Tadjenanet	1–2	Paradou AC	Tadjenanet
16:00	Aïb 90+5'	Soccerway report Live TV: None	33' El Mellali; 88' Naidji	Stadium: Lahoua Smaïl Stadium; Referee: Farouk Mial

16 March 2018 Round 23	NA Hussein Dey	3–0	DRB Tadjenanet	Belouizdad
16:00	Zeghnoun 36'; Alati 89'; Chouiter 90+3'	Soccerway report Live TV: EPTV Terrestre / TV Tamazight 4		Stadium: Stade 20 Août 1955; Referee: Lahlou Benbraham

30 March 2018 Round 24	DRB Tadjenanet	2–0	JS Saoura	Tadjenanet
16:00	Dousse 26'; Demane 90+1'	Soccerway report Live TV: None		Stadium: Lahoua Smaïl Stadium; Referee: Abderrazek Hallalchi

7 April 2018 Round 25	DRB Tadjenanet	1–0	USM Bel-Abbès	Tadjenanet
16:00	Fourloul 21'	Soccerway report Live TV: TV Tamazight 4		Stadium: Lahoua Smaïl Stadium; Referee: Abderrezzak Arab

20 April 2018 Round 26	USM El Harrach	1–2	DRB Tadjenanet	Belouizdad
16:00	Khelili 76'	Soccerway report Live TV: None	55' Belmokhtar; 78' Terbah	Stadium: Stade 20 Août 1955; Referee: Mustapha Bessiri

24 April 2018 Round 27	DRB Tadjenanet	1–1	MC Alger	Tadjenanet
16:00	Meddahi 22'	Soccerway report Live TV: Canal Algérie	90+6' Derrardja	Stadium: Lahoua Smaïl Stadium; Referee: Nabil Boukhalfa

4 May 2018 Round 28	US Biskra	4–0	DRB Tadjenanet	Biskra
16:00	Mouaki Dadi 13'; Berbache 37'; Kangou 75'; Touré 87'	Soccerway report Live TV: None		Stadium: El Alia Sports Complex; Attendance: 0 (close doors); Referee: Mustapha Ghorbal

12 May 2018 Round 29	DRB Tadjenanet	3–2	ES Sétif	Tadjenanet
16:00	Dousse 37' (pen.), 45'; Daouadji 61'	Soccerway report Live TV: Algérie 3	59' (pen.) Aouedj; 74' (pen.) Bakir	Stadium: Lahoua Smaïl Stadium; Referee: Hamza Bouslimani

19 May 2018 Round 30	CR Belouizdad	1–2	DRB Tadjenanet	Belouizdad
16:00	Lakroum 58'	Soccerway report Live TV: None	3' Hammouche; 39' Belmokhtar	Stadium: Stade 20 Août 1955; Referee: Ahmed Bouzrar

== Algerian Cup ==
29 December 2017 Round of 64	DRB Tadjenanet	3–0	CRB El Amria	Tadjenanet
14:30	Dousse 4'; Hoggas 87'; Cherif 90+1'	Report; Live TV: None		Stadium: Lahoua Smaïl Stadium; Referee: Dokhani, Dilmi, Etchellali

12 January 2018 Round of 32	DRB Tadjenanet	2–1	MC Saïda	Tadjenanet
14:45	Hoggas 10'; Aïb 83'	Report; Live TV: EPTV Terrestre / Canal Algérie	40' Yacine Guenina	Stadium: Lahoua Smaïl Stadium; Referee: Brahim, Boulkrinat, Badache

3 February 2018 Round of 16	USM Blida	5–0	DRB Tadjenanet	Blida
14:30	Herbache 4'; Si Ammar 25', 54', 64'; Frioui 46' (pen.)	[ Report] Live TV: None		Stadium: Brakni Brothers Stadium; Referee: Mustapha Bessiri

== Squad information ==
=== Playing statistics ===
No.	Pos	Nat	Player	Total		Ligue 1		Algerian Cup	
No.	Pos	Nat	Player	Apps	Goals	Apps	Goals	Apps	Goals
Goalkeepers
1	GK	(Algeria) ALG	Billel Boufeneche	8	0	8	0	0	0
30	GK	(Algeria) ALG	Oussama Litim	24	0	24	0	0	0
Defenders
28	DF	(Algeria) ALG	Achref Aïb	27	0	27	0	0	0
	DF	(Algeria) ALG	Senoussi Fourloul	16	1	16	1	0	0
	DF	(Algeria) ALG	Mohamed Hammouche	12	1	12	1	0	0
	DF	(Algeria) ALG	Abderrahime Hamra	14	0	14	0	0	0
15	DF	(Algeria) ALG	Abdelhafid Hoggas	16	0	16	0	0	0
12	DF	(Algeria) ALG	Oussama Meddahi	29	1	29	1	0	0
14	DF	(Algeria) ALG	Djilali Terbah	25	1	25	1	0	0
	DF	(Algeria) ALG	Hamza Zeddam	2	0	2	0	0	0
Midfielders
22	MF	(Algeria) ALG	Mohamed Darfalou	6	0	6	0	0	0
25	MF	(Algeria) ALG	Toufik Guerabis	19	0	19	0	0	0
13	MF	(Algeria) ALG	Foued Hadded	20	2	20	2	0	0
18	MF	(Algeria) ALG	Abel Khaled	14	2	14	2	0	0
21	MF	(Algeria) ALG	Tayeb Maroci	27	1	27	1	0	0
	MF	(Algeria) ALG	Mohamed Taib	11	0	11	0	0	0
Forwards
9	FW	(Algeria) ALG	Mohamed Hichem Attouche	16	4	16	4	0	0
	FW	(Algeria) ALG	Mohamed El Amine Belmokhtar	28	7	28	7	0	0
20	FW	(Algeria) ALG	Hamza Demane	25	4	25	4	0	0
24	FW	(Algeria) ALG	Abdelouahab Djahel	18	0	18	0	0	0
	FW	(Algeria) ALG	Abdellah Djelloul Daouadji	7	1	7	1	0	0
27	FW	(Mali) MLI	Kodjo Dousse	26	6	26	6	0	0
	FW	(Algeria) ALG	Chaker Chérif	4	0	4	0	0	0
	FW	(Algeria) ALG	Walid Sbia	4	1	4	1	0	0
Players transferred out during the season

Last updated: 15 June 2018
Source: fr.soccerway.com

== Squad list ==
As of August 25, 2017. Note: Flags indicate national team as defined under FIFA eligibility rules; some limited exceptions apply. Players may hold more than one non-FIFA nationality.

No.	Pos.	Nation	Player
1	GK	ALG	Billel Boufeneche
2	DF	ALG	Ali Guitoune (Captain)
6	DF	ALG	Fourloul Senoussi
8	MF	ALG	Mohammed Yassine
9	FW	ALG	Mohamed Hichem Attouche
12	DF	ALG	Oussama Meddahi
13	MF	ALG	Foued Hadded
14	DF	ALG	Djilali Terbah
15	DF	ALG	Abdelhafid Hoggas
16	GK	ALG	Saddam Merriche
18	FW	ALG	Abel Khaled
20	FW	ALG	Hamza Demane
21	MF	ALG	Tayeb Maroci

No.	Pos.	Nation	Player
22	MF	ALG	Mohamed Darfalou
24	FW	ALG	Abdelouahab Djahel
25	FW	ALG	Toufik Guerabis
27	FW	MLI	Kodjo Dousse
28	MF	ALG	Achref Aïb
30	GK	ALG	Oussama Litim
-	FW	ALG	Kheireddine Khedidja
-	FW	ALG	Mohamed El Amine Belmokhtar
-	DF	ALG	Mohamed El Amine Hammouche
-	MF	ALG	Rached Anis Benrabah
-	MF	ALG	Abdelhakim Bezzaz
-	FW	ALG	Walid Ben Messaoud

== Transfers ==
=== In ===
Date	Pos	Player	From club	Transfer fee	Source
26 June 2017	FW	(Algeria) Walid Benmessaoud	WR M’sila	Free transfer	
8 January 2018	FW	(Algeria) Abdellah Djelloul Daouadji	Paradou AC	Loan	

=== Out ===
Date	Pos	Player	To club	Transfer fee	Source
9 July 2017	FW	(Algeria) Youcef Chibane	ES Sétif	Free transfer	
9 July 2017	FW	(Algeria) Fethi Noubli	MO Béjaïa	Free transfer	
