= 2016–17 Algerian Cup =

- Stade du 5 Juillet hosted the final

Tournament details
- Country: Algeria
- Dates: 24 November 2016 – 5 July 2017
- Teams: 64 (as of first national round)

Final positions
- Champions: CR Belouizdad
- Runners-up: ES Setif

Tournament statistics
- Matches played: 56
- Goals scored: 139 (2.48 per match)
- Top goal scorer: Mohamed Boulaouidet (5 goals)

The 2016–17 Algerian Cup was the 53rd edition of the Algerian Cup. The eventual winners were CR Belouizdad who qualified for the 2018 CAF Confederation Cup.

== Teams ==
Round	Clubs remaining	Clubs involved	Winners from previous round	New entries this round	Leagues entering at this round
First Round	-	-	-	-	Inter-Régions Division; Ligue Régional I Ligue Régional II; Ligue de Football de la Wilaya
Second Round	-	-	-	-	none
Third Round	192	-	-	-	Ligue Nationale du Football Amateur; Algerian Ligue Professionnelle 2
Fourth Round	96	-	-	-	none
Round of 64	64	64	48	16	Algerian Ligue Professionnelle 1
Round of 32	32	32	32	none	none
Round of 16	16	16	16	none	none
Quarter-finals	8	8	8	none	none
Semi-finals	4	4	4	none	none
Final	2	2	2	none	none

== Round of 64 ==
The Round of 64 draw took place on 13 November and was broadcast live on Algérie 3. All 32 Round of 64 ties are due to be played on the weekend of 24 November. 48 teams from the qualifying competition join the 16 teams from Ligue Professionnelle 1 to compete in this round. The round includes one team from Level 6 still in the competition, IRB Béchar Djedid, who are the lowest-ranked team in this round.

24 November 2016	MC Oran (1)	2–0	MC El Eulma (2)	Oran
14:45	Bentiba 43', 81' (pen.)	Report; Live TV: None		Stadium: Stade Ahmed Zabana; Attendance: 0 (close doors); Referee: Bekkouassa, Rimouch, Asclou

24 November 2016	USM Alger (1)	2–0	NT Souf (4)	Bologhine
17:00	Sayoud 43'; Guessan 78'	Report; Live TV: TV Tamazight 4		Stadium: Stade Omar Hamadi; Referee: Azzaz, Benaceur, Djafi

24 November 2016	CA Bordj Bou Arréridj (2)	1–0	DRB Tadjenanet (1)	Bordj Bou Arréridj
17:00	Daouadi 40' (pen.)	Report; Live TV: Canal Algérie		Stadium: August 20, 1955 Stadium; Referee: Saïdi, Mesbah, Oudene

25 November 2016	IRB Oued Rhiou (3)	1–0	ES Bouakeul (4)	Relizane
14:45	Kasiour 4' (pen.)	Report; Live TV: None		Stadium: Stade Tahar Zoughari; Referee: Kacemi, Belbechir, Alloune

25 November 2016	CAM Skikda (5)	2–1 (a.e.t.)	ES Guelma (3)	Skikda
14:45	Kahlouche 102', 104'	Report; Live TV: None	Yahia 117'	Stadium: Stade 20 Août 1955; Referee: Hansal, Mabrouk, Djaballah

25 November 2016	US Chaouia (3)	2–1	IRB Aïn Lahdjar (4)	Oum El Bouaghi
14:45	Dakhmouche 65'; Saighi 75' (pen.)	Report; Live TV: None	Bendjedi 62'	Stadium: Stade Hassouna Zerdani; Referee: Missoum, Boudejkdji, Sadji

25 November 2016	JSB Sidi Bouaziz (5)	0–6	ASO Chlef (2)	Touggourt
14:45		Report; Live TV: None	Melika 15'; Soltani 28'; Attafen 32'; Mebarki 55'; Khellou 62' (o.g.); Messaoud 70'	Stadium: Mohamed Chabani Stadium; Referee: Bousneb, Badache, Felidja

25 November 2016	NC Magra (3)	0–0 (a.e.t.) (5–6 p)	JS Saoura (1)	M'Sila
14:45		Report; Live TV: None		Stadium: Chahid Ouartal El Bachir Stadium; Referee: Benzahra, Tizazoua, Athmane

25 November 2016	N El Fedjoudj (4)	1–0	IRB Aïn Hadjar (4)	Guelma
14:45	Hmisi 87'	Report; Live TV: None		Stadium: Stade Souidani Boujemaa; Referee: Mehkouk, Bourouba, Slimani

25 November 2016	DRB Staouéli (5)	1–1 (a.e.t.) (5–4 p)	IRB El Kerma (4)	Zéralda
15:00	Mokrani 74'	Report; Live TV: None	Dahou 85'	Stadium: Zéralda Stadium

25 November 2016	ORB Oued Fodda (4)	1–3	Paradou AC (2)	Chlef
15:00	Chorfi 78'	Report; Live TV: None	Benayad 45'; Meziani 47', 52'	Stadium: Stade Mohamed Boumezrag; Attendance: 0 (close doors); Referee: Benyahia, Filali, Mehiri

25 November 2016	FCB Frenda (4)	1–0 (a.e.t.)	HB Chelghoum Laïd (3)	Tiaret
15:00		Report; Live TV: None		Stadium: Stade Ait Abderrahim Ahmed

25 November 2016	WAN Tissemsilt (4)	0–5	JS Kabylie (1)	Tissemsilt
15:00		Report; Live TV: None	Herbache 6' (pen.); Radouani 24'; Boulaouidet 43', 55', 80' (pen.)	Stadium: Stade Djillali Bounaâma; Referee: Benabdellah, Miraoui, Belhadj

25 November 2016	IS Tighennif (4)	1–0 (a.e.t.)	E Sour El Ghozlane (5)	Mascara
15:00	Riahi 120'	Report; Live TV: None		Stadium: Stade Meftah Aouad; Referee: Bahloul, Amri, Saadi

25 November 2016	CA Batna (1)	2–1	JS Azazga (4)	Batna
15:00	Babouche 71' (pen.); Rebouh 75'	Report; Live TV: None	Khenab 55' (o.g.)	Stadium: Stade Seffouhi; Referee: Fesih, Belamri, Belagha

25 November 2016	JSM Bejaïa (2)	1–1 (a.e.t.) (1–2 p)	USM Blida (2)	Béjaïa
16:00	Ouanas 48' (pen.)	Report	Zerguine 32' (pen.)	Stadium: Stade de l'Unité Maghrébine; Attendance: 15,000; Referee: Arab, Bioud, Hamlaoui

25 November 2016	AS Bordj Ghedir (4)	0–1	CR Belouizdad (1)	Bordj Bou Arréridj
16:00		Report; Live TV: None	Feham 66'	Stadium: August 20, 1955 Stadium; Referee: Baâtouche, Mokrane, Benchaâbia

25 November 2016	ES Sétif (1)	2–0	SCM Oran (3)	Sétif
16:00	Bouchar 52'; Amada 55' (pen.)	Report; Live TV: None		Stadium: Stade 8 Mai 1945; Referee: Dafri, Kachi, Benhamouda

25 November 2016	CS Constantine (1)	2–1	ASM Oran (2)	Constantine
16:00	Belameiri 79', 86'	Report; Live TV: None	Masmoudi 89'	Stadium: Stade Mohamed Hamlaoui; Referee: Sekhraoui, Salaouadji, Hadji

25 November 2016	RC Kouba (3)	1–2 (a.e.t.)	USM Bel-Abbès (1)	Belouizdad
16:00	Kedjour 58'	Report; Live TV: EPTV Terrestre / TV Tamazight 4	Balegh 41', 116'	Stadium: Stade 20 Août 1955; Referee: Abid Charef, Benamara, Motrane

26 November 2016	US Beni Douala (3)	2–0	NRB Bouchegouf (5)	Tizi Ouzou
15:00	Chouiter 5'; Hani 15'	Report; Live TV: None		Stadium: Stade 1er Novembre 1954; Referee: Choul, Bazine, Mokar

26 November 2016	CRB Aïn Fakroun (2)	0–2	Olympique de Médéa (1)	Aïn Fakroun
14:45		Report; Live TV: None	Zeroual 70'; Rachedi 84'	Stadium: Mohamed Alleg Stadium; Referee: Maascri, Tazoul, Abbane

26 November 2016	RC Relizane (1)	2–1	ES Mostaganem (3)	Relizane
15:00	Tebbi 20'; Nemdil 50'	Report; Live TV: Canal Algérie	Belahouel 59'	Stadium: Stade Tahar Zoughari; Referee: Benouza, Amari, Zitri

26 November 2016	A Sidi Mahdi (5)	0–1	MC Saïda (2)	Touggourt
14:45		Report; Live TV: None	Hamidi 71'	Stadium: Mohamed Chabani Stadium; Referee: Meziani, Tamrabet, Bendeaâs

26 November 2016	CRB Hennaya (4)	2–0	IRB Béchar Djedid (6)	Maghnia
15:00	Benouis 60'; Lahbiri 85'	Report; Live TV: None		Stadium: Stade Frères Nouali; Referee: Aït Amer, Rachedi, Rahmoune

26 November 2016	USM Annaba (3)	2–1	US Biskra (2)	Annaba
15:00	Maïza 20'; Benadssou 25'	Report; Live TV: Algérie 3	Djaabout 39'	Stadium: May 19, 1956 Stadium; Referee: Benbraham, Allaoua, Henni

26 November 2016	MO Béjaïa (1)	0–1	NA Hussein Dey (1)	Sétif
14:45		Report; Live TV: None	Gasmi 51'	Stadium: Stade 8 Mai 1945 (Note: MO Béjaïa play away from home and behind closed doors because of the violence in a meeting the Ligue Professionnelle 1 against MC Oran.); Attendance: 0 (close doors); Referee: Boukhalfa, Zerhouni, Benali

26 November 2016	MC Alger (1)	3–2	OM Arzew (3)	Bologhine
15:00	Djemaouni 32'; Seguer 77'; Cherif Ouazzani 85' (pen.)	Report; Live TV: None	Bahari 76'; Mebarki 90'	Stadium: Stade Omar Hamadi; Attendance: 0 (close doors); Referee: Hafirassou, Gourari, Boulfelfel

26 November 2016	USM Khenchela (3)	1–0	EC Oued Smar (5)	Khenchela
14:45	Frahtia 23'	Report; Live TV: None		Stadium: Stade Hamem Amar; Referee: Bounab, Bourechou, Bettahar

26 November 2016	MCB Oued Sly (4)	1–2	USM El Harrach (1)	Chlef
15:00	Ouadah 80'	Report; Live TV: None	Aïchi 65'; Sayahi 74'	Stadium: Stade Mohamed Boumezrag; Referee: Bounedjmer, Kemam, Zemit

26 November 2016	ES Berrouaghia (4)	1–2	US Tébessa (3)	Médéa
14:45	Khettab 30'	Report; Live TV: None	Ben Djedda 18'; Zouni 62'	Stadium: Stade Imam Lyes de Médéa; Attendance: 0 (close doors); Referee: Brahimi, Ghidir, Kadem

26 November 2016	CRB El Milia (5)	1–2	MB Rouissat (3)	El Milia
14:45	Boussif 67'	Report; Live TV: None	Bensaci 32', 72'	Stadium: Saidouni Bachir Stadium; Referee: Boucham, Bourahla, Sifouni

== Round of 32 ==
14 December 2016	CR Belouizdad (1)	2–1	US Chaouia (3)	Mohamed Belouizdad
17:30	Yahia-Chérif 50'; Feham 81' (pen.)	Report; Live TV: TV Tamazight 4	S. Sahbi 39'	Stadium: August 20, 1955 Stadium; Referee: Oukil, Serradj, Arfa

15 December 2016	DRB Staouéli (5)	0–5	ES Sétif (1)	Bologhine
16:30		Report; Live TV: TV Tamazight 4 / Canal Algérie	Amokrane 32', 46'; Djahnit 34'; Aït Ouamar 61'; Bekir 84'	Stadium: Omar Hamadi Stadium; Referee: Ouali, Mezaach, Dilmi

16 December 2016	FCB Frenda (4)	0–1	MC Alger (1)	Tiaret
14:45		Report; Live TV: None	Derrardja 84'	Stadium: Stade Ahmed Kaïd; Referee: Arbaoui, Necib, Mesbah

16 December 2016	CRB Hennaya (4)	2–3 (a.e.t.)	CA Bordj Bou Arréridj (2)	Tlemcen
14:45	Lahdiri 79' (pen.); Mogdad 92'	Report; Live TV: None	Madouni 39'; Yalaoui 45'; Bouflih 100' (pen.)	Stadium: Stade des 3 Frères-Zerga; Referee: Khedar, Bouzid, Bouteghan

16 December 2016	MB Rouissat (3)	1–2 (a.e.t.)	JS Kabylie (1)	Ouargla
14:45	Tahra 85'	Report; Live TV: None	Redouani 77'; Boulaouidet 100'	Stadium: Olympic Ouargla Stadium; Referee: Achouri, Tamen, Benhamouda

16 December 2016	MC Saïda (2)	2–0	USM Blida (2)	Saïda
14:45	Bekhtaoui 27'; Zouaoui 44'	Report; Live TV: None		Stadium: Stade 13 Avril 1958; Referee: Bouzar, Lassini, Rahmoune

16 December 2016	USM Alger (1)	1–0	CA Batna (1)	Bologhine
16:00	Meftah 83'	Report; Live TV: EPTV Terrestre / Canal Algérie		Stadium: Omar Hamadi Stadium; Referee: Ghorbal, Itchiali, Hadj Said

16 December 2016	ASO Chlef (2)	2–1	MC Oran (1)	Chlef
16:00	Boutiba 78'; Meddahi 87'	Report; Live TV: TV Tamazight 4 / Algérie 3	Delhoum 9'	Stadium: Mohamed Boumezrag Stadium; Referee: Bekouassa, Hamlaoui, Benoua

17 December 2016	Nasr El-Fedjoudj (4)	0–0 (a.e.t.) (4–3 p)	USM Annaba (3)	Guelma
14:30		Report; Live TV: None		Stadium: Stade Souidani Boujemaa; Referee: Brahimi, Chamchoum, Chebala

17 December 2016	US Tébessa (3)	2–1	IRB Oued Rhiou (3)	Tébessa
14:30	Bendjeda 40'; Khoualed 78'	Report; Live TV: None	Kasiour 57' (pen.)	Stadium: Stade du 4 Mars; Referee: Baâtouche, Amri, Atrous

17 December 2016	USM Khenchela (3)	2–2 (a.e.t.) (3–4 p)	Paradou AC (2)	Khenchela
14:30	Chekhrite 9'; El Aïdani 75'	Report; Live TV: TV Tamazight 4	Benouadah 15'; Mansouri 35' (pen.)	Stadium: Stade Hamem Amar; Referee: Bendjehane, Bourchou, Bouhessoune

17 December 2016	CAM Skikda (5)	0–4	US Beni Douala (3)	Skikda
14:30		Report; Live TV: None	Bensayah 51', 65', Nora 55' (pen.), 89' (pen.)	Stadium: Stade 20 Août 1955; Referee: Ibrir, Chalali, Hafiras

17 December 2016	IS Tighennif (4)	0–2	NA Hussein Dey (1)	Mascara
15:00		Report; Live TV: None	Abid 11' (pen.); El Orfi 56' (pen.)	Stadium: Stade de l'Unité Africaine; Referee: Taroudi, Boudima, Saâdi

17 December 2016	USM Bel-Abbès (1)	2–0	RC Relizane (1)	Sidi Bel Abbès
16:00	Balegh 42'; Lamali 76'	Report; Live TV: Canal Algérie		Stadium: Stade 24 Fevrier 1956; Referee: Benbrahem, Gourari, Allaoua

17 December 2016	USM El Harrach (1)	2–1 (a.e.t.)	Olympique de Médéa (1)	Mohamed Belouizdad
16:00	Harrag 44' (pen.); Mellel 111'	Report; Live TV: Algérie 3	Hamia 89' (pen.)	Stadium: August 20, 1955 Stadium; Referee: Abid Charef, Boulfelfel, Benamira

17 December 2016	JS Saoura (1)	1–0	CS Constantine (1)	Béchar
17:00	Bencharif 22'	Report; Live TV: None		Stadium: August 20, 1955 Stadium; Referee: Benoura, Omari, Ayad

== Round of 16 ==
27 December 2016	JS Kabylie (1)	1–0	Nasr El-Fedjoudj (4)	Tizi Ouzou
17:00	Boulaouidet 84'	Report; Live TV: None		Stadium: November 1, 1954 Stadium; Referee: Boukouassa, Tazerout, Slimani

27 December 2016	USM Bel-Abbès (1)	0–0 (a.e.t.) (5–4 p)	USM Alger (1)	Sidi Bel Abbès
17:00		Report; Live TV: EPTV Terrestre		Stadium: Stade 24 Fevrier 1956; Referee: Brahimi, Semsoum, Chaballah
	Penalties
	Sidhoum (penalty missed); Benabderahmane (penalty scored); Belhocini (penalty missed); Cherifi (penalty scored); Balegh (penalty scored); Kourbia (penalty scored); Bounoua (penalty scored)		(penalty scored) Benyahia; (penalty missed) Sayoud; (penalty missed) Benguit; (penalty scored) Benmoussa; (penalty scored) Meziane; (penalty scored) Abdellaoui; (penalty missed) Beldjilali

27 December 2016	ES Sétif (1)	2–2 (a.e.t.) (7–6 p)	JS Saoura (1)	Sétif
17:00	Aït Ouamar 11'; Djabou 76' (pen.)	Report; Live TV: Algérie 3 / Canal Algérie	Hamia 60'; Djallit 65'	Stadium: Stade 8 Mai 1945; Referee: Abid Charef, Hamlaoui, Gourari
	Penalties
	Aït Ouamar (penalty scored); Lamri (penalty missed); Ziti (penalty scored); Bouchar (penalty scored); Djabou (penalty scored); Tembeng (penalty scored); Bekir (penalty scored); Rebiai (penalty scored)		(penalty missed) Djallit; (penalty scored) Bourdim; (penalty scored) Hamia; (penalty scored) Bousmaha; (penalty scored) Bapidi Fils; (penalty scored) Merbah; (penalty scored) Maaziz; (penalty missed) Toubal

27 December 2016	MC Alger (1)	7–1	US Beni Douala (3)	Bologhine
18:00	Bouguèche 2', 22'; Zerdab 31'; Djemaouni 46'; Boudebouda 60'; Azzi 79' (pen.); Kacem 89'	Report; Live TV: TV Tamazight 4	Zeghnoun 66'	Stadium: Omar Hamadi Stadium; Referee: Boukhalfa, Zerhouni, Benali

28 December 2016	MC Saïda (2)	1–1 (a.e.t.) (4–5 p)	CR Belouizdad (1)	Saïda
14:30	Zahzouh 50'	Report; Live TV: Canal Algérie	20' Niati	Stadium: Stade 13 Avril 1958; Referee: Achouri, Tamen, Benhamouda

28 December 2016	Paradou AC (2)	0–0 (a.e.t.) (5–6 p)	NA Hussein Dey (1)	Dar El Beïda
14:30		Report; Live TV: TV Tamazight 4		Stadium: Stade Omar Benrabah; Referee: Benouza, Hemar, Ayed
	Penalties
	Benouadah (penalty scored); Benyoucef (penalty scored); Messibah (penalty scored); Bouabta (penalty scored); Mansouri (penalty scored); Benkhelifa (penalty missed)		(penalty scored) Abid; (penalty scored) Ardji; (penalty scored) Zeddam; (penalty scored) Bendebka; (penalty scored) Khiat; (penalty scored) Ouali

28 December 2016	ASO Chlef (2)	2–4 (a.e.t.)	US Tébessa (3)	Chlef
14:30	Attafen 45'; Messaoud 105'	Report; Live TV: None	Ghazi 11'; Benjedda 107' (pen.); Aoulmi 111'; Hebbal 120+1'	Stadium: Mohamed Boumezrag Stadium; Attendance: 0 (close doors); Referee: Aouina S., Aouina F., Benaïssa

28 December 2016	CA Bordj Bou Arréridj (2)	1–0	USM El Harrach (1)	Bordj Bou Arréridj
16:30	Benachour 39'	Report; Live TV: Algérie 3		Stadium: August 20, 1955 Stadium; Referee: Ghorbal, Etchiali, Hadj Said

== Quarter-finals ==
31 March 2017	CR Belouizdad (1)	2–1	CA Bordj Bou Arreridj (2)	Mohamed Belouizdad
16:00	Hamia 2'; Yahia-Chérif 27'	Report; Live TV: Algérie 3 / TV Tamazight 4	32' Madouni	Stadium: August 20, 1955 Stadium; Referee: Boukhalfa, Seradj, Ayad

31 March 2017	ES Sétif (1)	4–0	US Tébessa (3)	Sétif
16:00	Kenniche 4', 38'; Bedrane 47'; Haddouche 81'	Report; Live TV: EPTV Terrestre / Canal Algérie		Stadium: Stade 8 Mai 1945; Referee: Helalachi, Bounoua, Azrine

1 April 2017	USM Bel-Abbès (1)	4–0	NA Hussein Dey (1)	Sidi Bel Abbès
16:00	Balegh 72'; Zouari 76'; Bouguelmouna 79', 84'	Report; Live TV: Algérie 3		Stadium: Stade 24 Fevrier 1956; Referee: S. Aouina, Kechida, F. Aouina

1 April 2017	MC Alger (1)	0–0 (a.e.t.) (3–1 p)	JS Kabylie (1)	Algiers
16:00		Report; Live TV: Canal Algérie		Stadium: July 5, 1962 Stadium; Referee: Ghorbal, Zerhouni, Benali

== Semi-finals ==
20 June 2017	CR Belouizdad (1)	0–0 (a.e.t.) (6–5 p)	USM Bel-Abbès (1)	Mohamed Belouizdad
22:30		Report; Live TV: Canal Algérie / TV Tamazight 4 / Al-Kass Sports		Stadium: August 20, 1955 Stadium; Referee: Said Aouina

24 June 2017	MC Alger (1)	2–3 (a.e.t.)	ES Sétif (1)	Bologhine
22:30	Aouedj 30'; Boudebouda 116'	Report; Live TV: Canal Algérie / TV Tamazight 4 / Al-Kass Sports	28' Ziti; 99' Bedrane; 115' Djabou	Stadium: Stade Omar Hamadi; Referee: Abderrezzak Arab

== Final ==
5 July 2017
16:45

CR Belouizdad	1 - 0	ES Sétif
Yahia-Chérif 117'	Report

July 5, 1962 Stadium, Algiers
Attendance: 50,000
Referee: Mustapha Ghorbal
