= 2017–18 Olympique de Médéa season =

Olympique de Médéa
2017–18 season
- Head coach: Sid Ahmed Slimani
- Stadium: Stade Imam Lyes de Médéa, Médéa
- Ligue 1: 13th
- Algerian Cup: Round of 32
- Top goalscorer: League: Badreddine Bahi (4); All: Badreddine Bahi (4)

In the 2017–18 season, Olympique de Médéa is competing in the Ligue 1 for the 2nd season, as well as the Algerian Cup.

== Non-competitive ==
=== Overview ===
Competition	Record								Started round	Final position / round	First match	Last match
Competition	G	W	D	L	GF	GA	GD	Win %	Started round	Final position / round	First match	Last match
Ligue 1	30	8	12	10	23	32	−9	26.67	—N/a	13th	25 August 2017	19 May 2018
Algerian Cup	2	1	1	0	2	0	+2	50.00	Round of 64	Round of 32	29 December 2017	12 January 2018
Total	32	9	13	10	25	32	−7	28.13				

Updated to match played 9 May 2017
Source: Competitions

== League table ==
Pos	Team	Pld	W	D	L	GF	GA	GD	Pts	Qualification or relegation
11	JS Kabylie	30	8	12	10	34	39	−5	36 (Note: Ranked on head-to-head results.)	
12	CR Belouizdad	30	7	15	8	24	27	−3	36	
13	Olympique de Médéa	30	8	12	10	23	32	−9	36	
14	US Biskra (R)	30	9	7	14	23	30	−7	34	Relegation to Algerian Ligue Professionnelle 2
15	USM El Harrach (R)	30	7	7	16	27	37	−10	28	Relegation to Algerian Ligue Professionnelle 2

Updated to match(es) played on 19 May 2018. Source: DZFoot
Rules for classification: 1) points; 2) head-to-head points; 3) head-to-head goal difference; 4) goal difference; 5) total goals; 6) fairplay ranking; 7) playoff.
(R) Relegated

=== Results summary ===
Overall								Home						Away					
Pld	W	D	L	GF	GA	GD	Pts	W	D	L	GF	GA	GD	W	D	L	GF	GA	GD
30	8	12	10	23	32	−9	36	7	6	2	16	8	+8	1	6	8	7	24	−17

Last updated: 30 January 2016.
Source: Competitive matches

=== Results by round ===
Round	1	2	3	4	5	6	7	8	9	10	11	12	13	14	15	16	17	18	19	20	21	22	23	24	25	26	27	28	29	30
Ground																														
Result	D	L	W	D	L	D	D	W	D	D	L	D	L	W	L	D	L	W	W	L	D	D	L	D	D	W	L	W	L	W
Position	7	12	9	10	12	12	11	10	11	11	12	12	13	11	13	12	13	10	10	10	9	10	10	11	12	10	13	12	13	13

Source: Competitive matches
A = Away; H = Home; W = Win; D = Draw; L = Loss

=== Matches ===
Win Draw Loss

25 August 2017 Round 1	Olympique de Médéa	1–1	DRB Tadjenanet	Médéa
17:00	Bahi 38'	Soccerway report Live TV: None	50' Attouche	Stadium: Stade Imam Lyes de Médéa; Referee: Merzak Halalchi

9 September 2017 Round 2	USM Bel-Abbès	2–1	Olympique de Médéa	Sidi Bel Abbès
17:00	Bounoua 35' (pen.); Bouguelmouna 76'	Soccerway report Live TV: None	49' Koulkheir	Stadium: Stade 24 Fevrier 1956; Referee: Rafik Achouri

15 September 2017 Round 3	Olympique de Médéa	1–0	USM El Harrach	Médéa
16:00	Benali 59'	Soccerway report Live TV: EPTV Terrestre / Algérie 3		Stadium: Stade Imam Lyes de Médéa; Referee: Mustapha Ghorbal

3 October 2017 Round 4	MC Alger	0–0	Olympique de Médéa	Bologhine
18:00		Soccerway report Live TV: Algérie 3 / TV Tamazight 4		Stadium: Omar Hamadi Stadium; Referee: Mohamed Boukhalfa

29 September 2017 Round 5	Olympique de Médéa	1–2	US Biskra	Médéa
16:00	Bahi 49'	Soccerway report Live TV: Algérie 3	24' (pen.) Rachedi; 73' El Okbi	Stadium: Stade Imam Lyes de Médéa; Referee: Hamza Bouslimani

13 October 2017 Round 6	ES Sétif	0–0	Olympique de Médéa	Sétif
17:00		Soccerway report Live TV: TV Tamazight 4		Stadium: Stade 8 Mai 1945; Referee: Lyés Bekouassa

17 October 2017 Round 7	Olympique de Médéa	1–1	CR Belouizdad	Médéa
16:00	Mesfar 60'	Soccerway report Live TV: Canal Algérie	3' Aribi	Stadium: Stade Imam Lyes de Médéa; Referee: Lahlou Benbraham

21 October 2017 Round 8	Olympique de Médéa	2–0	JS Saoura	Médéa
16:00	Bahi 36', 54'	Soccerway report Live TV: None		Stadium: Stade Imam Lyes de Médéa; Referee: Abderrezzak Arab

27 October 2017 Round 9	CS Constantine	1–1	Olympique de Médéa	Constantine
16:00	Abid 51'	Soccerway report Live TV: None	4' Boucherit	Stadium: Stade Mohamed Hamlaoui; Referee: Amine Sekhraoui

3 November 2017 Round 10	Olympique de Médéa	1–1	USM Alger	Médéa
15:00	Baouche 55'	Soccerway report Live TV: None	89' Darfalou	Stadium: Stade Imam Lyes de Médéa; Referee: Mohamed Saïdi

11 November 2017 Round 11	MC Oran	2–0	Olympique de Médéa	Oran
17:00	Boubekeur 56' (o.g.); Toumi 67'	Soccerway report Live TV: TV Tamazight 4		Stadium: Ahmed Zabana Stadium; Referee: Amine Hansal

17 November 2017 Round 12	Olympique de Médéa	0–0	JS Kabylie	Médéa
15:00		Soccerway report Live TV: None		Stadium: Stade Imam Lyes de Médéa; Referee: Lotfi Bekouassa

2 December 2017 Round 13	USM Blida	2–1	Olympique de Médéa	Blida
15:00	Frioui 24'; Rabti 90+5' (pen.)	Soccerway report Live TV: None	90' Bouabdallah	Stadium: Brakni Brothers Stadium; Referee: Lyés Bekouassa

8 December 2017 Round 14	Olympique de Médéa	1–0	Paradou AC	Médéa
15:00	Bouabdallah 71'	Soccerway report Live TV: None		Stadium: Stade Imam Lyes de Médéa; Referee: Mustapha Ghorbal

16 December 2017 Round 15	NA Hussein Dey	2–0	Olympique de Médéa	Belouizdad
16:00	Gasmi 52'; Chekhrit 84'	Soccerway report Live TV: None		Stadium: Stade 20 Août 1955; Referee: Farouk Mial

5 January 2018 Round 16	DRB Tadjenanet	0–0	Olympique de Médéa	Tadjenanet
15:00		Soccerway report Live TV: Algérie 3		Stadium: Lahoua Smaïl Stadium; Referee: Missoum Benabdellah

20 January 2018 Round 17	Olympique de Médéa	0–1	USM Bel-Abbès	Médéa
15:00		Soccerway report Live TV: None	85' Bellahouel	Stadium: Stade Imam Lyes de Médéa; Referee: Amine Sekhraoui

27 January 2018 Round 18	USM El Harrach	2–3	Olympique de Médéa	Algiers
15:00	Benrokia 6'; Mellel 49'	Soccerway report Live TV: None	21' Abdelhafid; 62', 72' Boucherit	Stadium: Stade 1er Novembre 1954; Referee: Mustapha Bessiri

6 February 2018 Round 19	Olympique de Médéa	1–0	MC Alger	Médéa
15:00	Koulkheir 23'	Soccerway report Live TV: None		Stadium: Stade Imam Lyes de Médéa; Referee: Nabil Boukhalfa

15 February 2018 Round 20	US Biskra	2–0	Olympique de Médéa	Biskra
16:00	Maanser 19'; Berbache 29'	Soccerway report Live TV: Canal Algérie		Stadium: El Alia Sports Complex; Referee: Lotfi Bekouassa

24 February 2018 Round 21	Olympique de Médéa	0–0	ES Sétif	Médéa
15:00		Soccerway report Live TV: None		Stadium: Stade Imam Lyes de Médéa; Referee: Missoum Benabdellah

1 March 2018 Round 22	CR Belouizdad	0–0	Olympique de Médéa	Belouizdad
17:00		Soccerway report Live TV: EPTV Terrestre / Canal Algérie		Stadium: Stade 20 Août 1955; Referee: Mustapha Ghorbal

17 March 2018 Round 23	JS Saoura	2–0	Olympique de Médéa	Béchar
17:00	Yahia-Chérif 24'; Djallit 32' (pen.)	Soccerway report Live TV: None		Stadium: Stade 20 Août 1955; Referee: Redouane Necib

31 March 2018 Round 24	Olympique de Médéa	0–0	CS Constantine	Médéa
16:00		Soccerway report Live TV: None		Stadium: Stade Imam Lyes de Médéa; Referee: Lahlou Benbraham

13 April 2018 Round 25	USM Alger	1–1	Olympique de Médéa	Bologhine
16:00	Abdellaoui 38'	Soccerway report Live TV: None	12' Benamar	Stadium: Omar Hamadi Stadium; Attendance: 0 (close doors); Referee: Missoum Benabdellah

20 April 2018 Round 26	Olympique de Médéa	2–0	MC Oran	Médéa
16:00	Bouchiba 77' (pen.); Hamidi 90+2'	Soccerway report Live TV: None		Stadium: Stade Imam Lyes de Médéa; Referee: Lotfi Bekouassa

24 April 2018 Round 27	JS Kabylie	3–0	Olympique de Médéa	Tizi Ouzou
16:00	Yettou 36', 58'; Benaldjia 53'	Soccerway report Live TV: None		Stadium: November 1, 1954 Stadium; Referee: Redouane Necib

4 May 2018 Round 28	Olympique de Médéa	2–1	USM Blida	Médéa
16:00	Abdelhafid 76'; Motrani 85'	Soccerway report Live TV: None	31' El Imam	Stadium: Stade Imam Lyes de Médéa; Referee: Abderrezzak Arab

12 May 2018 Round 29	Paradou AC	5–0	Olympique de Médéa	Bologhine
16:00	Benayad 19' (pen.), 23'; Messibah 58'; Bouzok 68'; Loucif 72'	Soccerway report Live TV: None		Stadium: Omar Hamadi Stadium; Referee: Mustapha Ghorbal

19 May 2018 Round 30	Olympique de Médéa	3–1	NA Hussein Dey	Médéa
16:00	Abdelhafid 57'; Sameur 65' (pen.); Baouche 77'	Soccerway report Live TV: None	55' Chekhrit	Stadium: Stade Imam Lyes de Médéa; Referee: Mohamed Saïdi

== Algerian Cup ==
29 December 2017 Round of 64	DRB Staoueli	0–2	Olympique de Médéa	Belouizdad
15:00		Report; Live TV: EPTV Terrestre / Algérie 3	26' Boubekeur Islam; 74' Boucherit	Stadium: August 20, 1955 Stadium; Referee: Boucetta, Asklou, Flidja
Note: Lineup for Olympique de Médéa -

12 January 2018 Round of 32	IRB Belkheir	0–0 (a.e.t.) (7–6 p)	Olympique de Médéa	Guelma
14:45		Report; Live TV: None		Stadium: Stade Souidani Boujemaa; Referee: Kebbab, Bendaas, Haouasi
	Penalties
	(penalty scored) (penalty scored); Benabda (penalty scored); Brahmia (penalty scored) (penalty scored) (penalty scored) (penalty scored)		(penalty scored) Koulkhir; (penalty scored) Izmani; (penalty scored) Bouchrit (penalty scored); (penalty scored) Bouchiba; (penalty scored) Belkhir; (penalty missed) Benamar
Note: Lineup for Olympique de Médéa - Morcely, Hadj Chikh Boucherit, Benamar (Islam Boubekeur 80'), Koulkheir, Nammouchi (Ezzamani 100'), Zalami, Boussalem, Bouabdallah, Abdelhafid, Bahi (Merchla 58'), Bouchiba

== Squad information ==
=== Playing statistics ===
No.	Pos	Nat	Player	Total		Ligue 1		Algerian Cup	
No.	Pos	Nat	Player	Apps	Goals	Apps	Goals	Apps	Goals
Goalkeepers
30	GK	(Algeria) ALG	Zakaria Saidi	1	0	1	0	0	0
1	GK	(Algeria) ALG	Youcef Chikher	11	0	11	0	0	0
	GK	(Algeria) ALG	Abdelkader Morcely	18	0	18	0	0	0
Defenders
13	DF	(Algeria) ALG	Redouane Bachiri	1	0	1	0	0	0
	DF	(Algeria) ALG	Ishak Bouda	7	0	7	0	0	0
	DF	(Algeria) ALG	Hadj Chikh Boucherit	27	3	27	3	0	0
11	DF	(Algeria) ALG	Houari Baouche	27	2	27	2	0	0
3	DF	(Algeria) ALG	Ismail Idriss Chakhmam	4	0	4	0	0	0
25	DF	(Algeria) ALG	Chouaib Boucherit	1	0	1	0	0	0
4	DF	(Algeria) ALG	Imadeddine Boubekeur	24	0	24	0	0	0
	DF	(Algeria) ALG	Kamel Hamidi	6	1	6	1	0	0
27	DF	(Algeria) ALG	Merouane Boussalem	29	0	29	0	0	0
2	DF	(Algeria) ALG	Benali Benamar	29	3	29	3	0	0
12	DF	(Algeria) ALG	Mohamed Amine Ezzamani	16	0	16	0	0	0
Midfielders
	MF	(Algeria) ALG	Abdelhakim Sameur	12	1	12	1	0	0
24	MF	(Algeria) ALG	Adel Bouchiba	27	1	27	1	0	0
18	MF	(Algeria) ALG	Islam Boubekeur	8	0	8	0	0	0
	MF	(Algeria) ALG	Mohamed Zenagui	1	0	1	0	0	0
6	MF	(Algeria) ALG	Younes Koulkheir	29	2	29	2	0	0
	MF	(Algeria) ALG	Chems Eddine Merchla	9	0	9	0	0	0
5	MF	(Algeria) ALG	Chouaib Zalami	22	0	22	0	0	0
22	MF	(Algeria) ALG	Messaoud Midoune	8	0	8	0	0	0
Forwards
7	FW	(Algeria) ALG	Oussama Mesfar	4	1	4	1	0	0
29	FW	(Algeria) ALG	Ahmed Messadia	7	0	7	0	0	0
	FW	(Algeria) ALG	Redha Mansouri	1	0	1	0	0	0
	FW	(Algeria) ALG	Mohamed Houssam Herriche	1	0	1	0	0	0
9	FW	(Algeria) ALG	Zoubir Motrani	24	1	24	1	0	0
21	FW	(Algeria) ALG	Badreddine Bahi	21	4	21	4	0	0
77	FW	(Algeria) ALG	Zakaria Khaldi	8	0	8	0	0	0
14	FW	(Algeria) ALG	Yasser Anis Bouabdallah	10	1	10	1	0	0
	FW	(Algeria) ALG	Abdelhak Abdelhafid	15	3	15	3	0	0
Players transferred out during the season
10	MF	(Algeria) ALG	Sofiane Younes	7	0	7	0	0	0

Last updated: 11 June 2018
Source: fr.soccerway.com

== Squad list ==
As of August 25, 2017. Note: Flags indicate national team as defined under FIFA eligibility rules; some limited exceptions apply. Players may hold more than one non-FIFA nationality.

No.	Pos.	Nation	Player
1	GK	ALG	Youcef Chikher
2	DF	ALG	Benali Benamar
3	DF	ALG	Ismail Idriss Chakham
4	DF	ALG	Imadeddine Boubekeur (captain)
5	MF	ALG	Chouaib Zalami
6	MF	ALG	Younes Koulkheir
7	FW	ALG	Oussama Mesfar
9	FW	ALG	Zoubir Motrani
10	FW	ALG	Sofiane Younes
11	FW	ALG	Houari Baouche
12	MF	ALG	Mohamed Amine Ezzamani
13	DF	ALG	Redouane Bachiri
14	MF	ALG	Yasser Anis Bouabdallah
16	GK	ALG	Tahir Lamraoui

No.	Pos.	Nation	Player
18	MF	ALG	Islam Boubekeur
21	FW	ALG	Badreddine Bahi
22	MF	ALG	Messaoud Midoune
23	FW	ALG	Chems Eddine Merchla
24	MF	ALG	Adel Bouchiba
25	DF	ALG	Chouaib Boucherit
27	FW	ALG	Merouane Boussalem
29	FW	ALG	Ahmed Messadia
30	GK	ALG	Zakaria Saidi
77	MF	ALG	Zakaria Khaldi
-	DF	ALG	Abdelkader Morcely
-	MF	ALG	Mohamed Lamine Omrani
-	DF	ALG	Hadj Chikh Boucherit

== Transfers ==
=== In ===
Date	Pos	Player	To club	Transfer fee	Source
27 June 2017	FW	(Algeria) Sofiane Younes	USM El Harrach	Free transfer	

=== Out ===
Date	Pos	Player	To club	Transfer fee	Source
1 July 2017	MF	(Algeria) Toufik Addadi	NA Hussein Dey	Free transfer	
23 July 2017	FW	(Algeria) Nazim Si Salem	JS Kabylie	Free transfer	
30 July 2017	FW	(Algeria) Hamza Banouh	USM El Harrach	Free transfer	
7 January 2018	FW	(Algeria) Sofiane Younes	USM El Harrach	Free transfer (Released)	
