= El Badra =

- Genre: Drama
- Written by: Mohamed Hazourli
- Starring: Mohammed Adjaimi; Fatiha Berber; Morad Shaaban; Asma Djermoune; Nidhal Doja
- Country of origin: Algeria
- Original language: Arabic
- No. of seasons: 2
- No. of episodes: 60

Production
- Producer: Télévision Algérienne
- Running time: 35 min
- Production company: EPTV GROUP

Original release
- Network: Télévision Algérienne
- Release: 29 September 2005 – 7 October 2006

El Badra (Arabic: البذرة, transl. The seed) is an Algerian television series, produced and broadcast by Télévision Algérienne, directed by Mohamed Hazourli. It premiere from 2008 to 2010 on Télévision Algérienne, A3 and Canal Algérie.

It stars Mohammed Adjaimi, Fatiha Berber, Nidhal Doja and Asma Djermoune in the main role.

== Series overview ==
Country	Title	Language	Channel	Originally aired	
Country	Title	Language	Channel	First aired	Last aired
Algeria	البذرة (El Badra)	Algerian Arabic	Télévision Algérienne	2008	2010
Algeria	البذرة (El Badra)	Algerian Arabic	A3	2008	2010
Algeria	البذرة (El Badra)	Algerian Arabic	Canal Algérie	2008	2010
