= Television in Algeria =

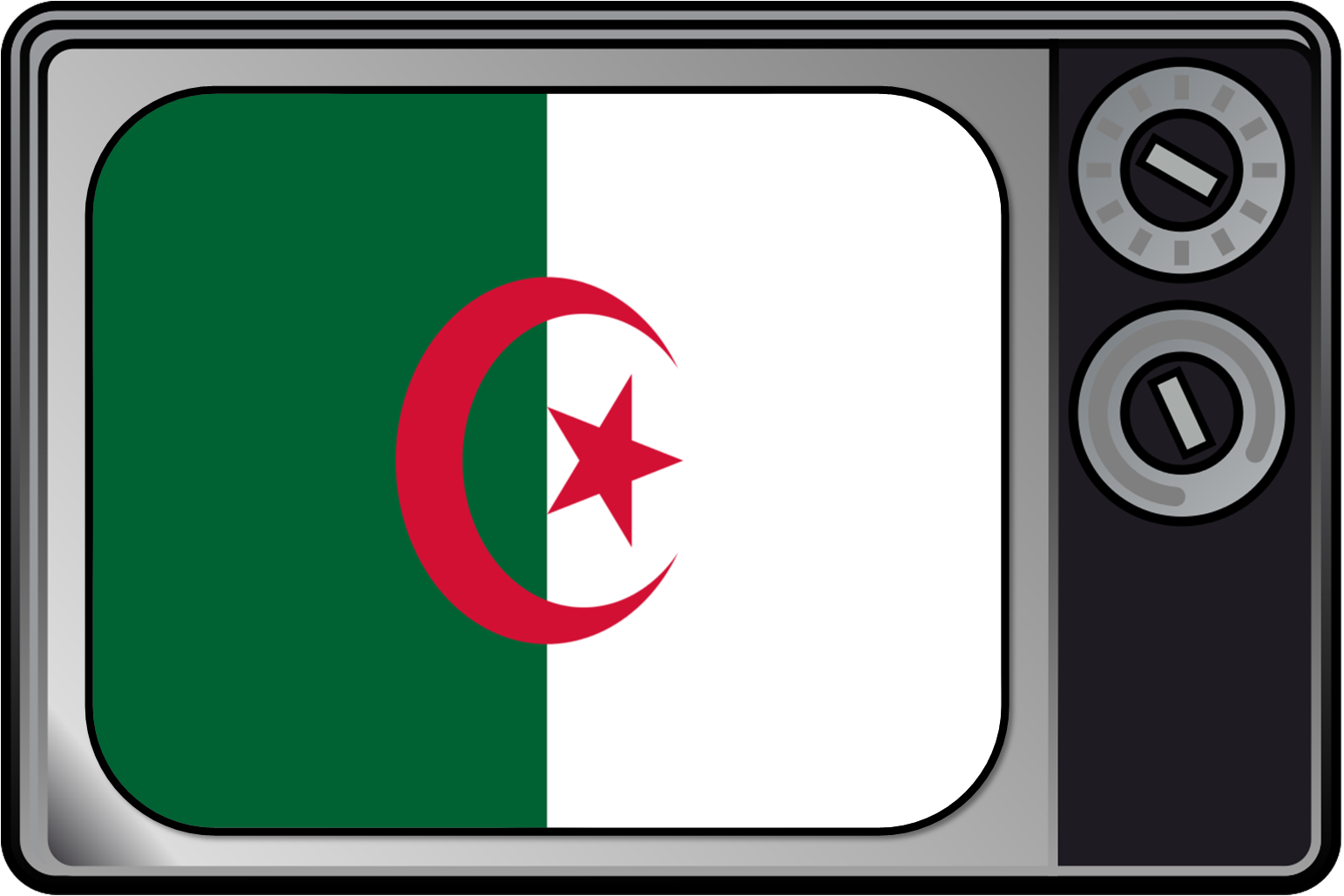
Television set with Algerian flag

Television services in the North African nation of Algeria commenced in 1956 (70 years ago), when the country was a department of France, under French broadcaster RTF. Shortly after independence, both television and radio were taken over by Algerian Radio and Television (Radiodiffusion-Télévision Algérienne; RTA). Since then, television began to expand throughout Algeria, with more than 53,000 television sets in use in the country as of 1963, a year after independence. Algeria is one of the first countries in Africa to publicly introduce television.

The country was served with only one television channel, Télévision Algérienne, until 1994, the year when the French-language Canal Algérie was launched, also serving Algerian audiences residing in Europe and North America. This was followed by the launch of Algérie 3 in 2001, also serving Algerians in other Arab-majority nations. On 18 March 2009, the Tamazight TV and Al Quran Al Kareem channels were launched.

== Most-viewed channels ==
| Position | Channel | Group | Share of total viewing (%) |
|---|---|---|---|
| 1 | TV1 (Algerian TV channel) | Public Establishment of Television | 26.5% |
| 2 | TV2 (Algerian TV channel) | Public Establishment of Television | 25.8% |
| 3 | TV3 (Algerian TV channel) | Public Establishment of Television | 25.5% |
| 4 | Ennahar TV | Groupe Ennahar | 13.3% |
| 5 | Echourouk TV | | 13.1% |
| 6 | Nessma TV | Karoui & Karoui World | 10.2% |

== See also ==
- Media of Algeria
- List of newspapers in Algeria
- List of radio stations in Africa: Algeria
- Internet in Algeria
