= List of French-language television channels =

The List of French-language television channels includes the following channels:

== Algeria ==
- TV1
- TV2
- TV6
- Berbère Télévision
- Berbère Music
- Berbére Jeunesse
- Beur TV
- Dzaïr TV

== See also ==
- Lists of television channels
- List of French television series
- List of Quebec television series
