= DZ Comedy Show =

- Promotional poster for DZ Comedy Show
- Also known as: Arabic: ديزاد كوميدي شو
- Slogan: Make me laugh, if you can! (Arabic: ضحكني، إلى قدرت !)
- Genre: Talent show; Comedy
- Directed by: Abdelkader Djeriou
- Presented by: Redouane Bila Houdoud; Mounia ben Feghoul
- Judges: Mohamed Khassani; Nassim Hadouche; Kamel Abdet; Abdelkader Jeriou
- Country of origin: Algeria
- Original language: Arabic
- No. of seasons: 1
- No. of episodes: 20 (qualifications); 2 (primes)

Production
- Production locations: Algiers, Algeria
- Camera setup: Multiple
- Production company: Not Found Prod

Original release
- Network: Télévision Algérienne; A3
- Release: March 12, 2017 – present

Related
- Qahwet El Gusto; Amine Comedy Bled

DZ Comedy Show (Arabic: ديزاد كوميدي شو, Dīzād Kūmīdī Shū) is an Algerian reality television talent show directed by Abdelkader Djeriou. Originally designed for Echorouk TV, the series were acquired by EPTV and air starting 12 March 2017 on Télévision Algérienne and A3. The goal of the program is to select a comedian from an initially large group of hopefuls. It is described as the "biggest comedy talent show of Algeria".

== Format ==
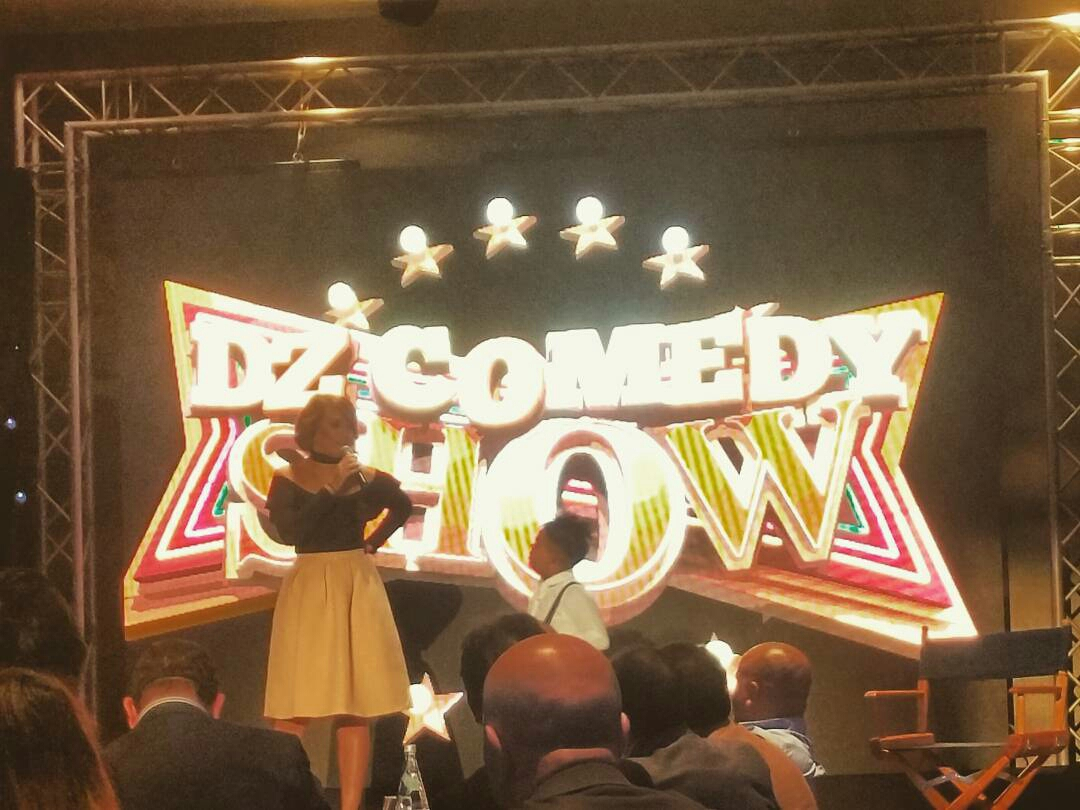
Presentation of the show in a gala organized by Not Found Prod in October 2016

DZ Comedy Show is widely similar in its format to NBC's Last Comic Standing. Télévision Algérienne talent scouts Mohamed Khassani, Nassim Hadouche, Kamel Abdet and Abdelkader Jeriou hold open casting calls in seven wilayas around Algeria: Algiers, Constantine, Annaba, Oran, Sétif, Béjaïa and Ouargla.

selections then was from a group of 400 candidates, only 24 comics aged between 16 and 60 years from the callbacks, who will be invited to participate in a semifinal qualifying round in Algiers, where they will perform and compete against each other. During this round, the 14 finalists will be selected and would move forward to the final or live performances round. In this round, the comics would participate in some type of comedic challenge each television week. Challenges could include performing stand-up, participating in a roast or performing comedy on a specific subject. One comic will be eliminated each week from the competition, until there will be only the "Algeria's Comedy Star of the Year".

== Casting dates ==
These were the casting dates for the first season of DZ Comedy Show:

Date	Wilaya	Location
December 14 & 15, 2016	Constantine	Regional theater
December 17 & 18, 2016	Ouargla	Ijdagh Tour Touristic Complex
December 20 & 21, 2016	Annaba	Azzedine Medjoubi Regional Theater
December 22, 2016	Sétif	Municipal theater
December 23, 2016	Béjaïa	Wilaya's theater
December 24 & 25, 2016	Algiers	Moufdi Zakaria Palace of Culture
December 26 & 27, 2016	Oran	Hotel Le Méridien

== See also ==
- Télévision Algérienne
- A3
- Public Establishment of Television
- Television in Algeria
