= Familetna =

Algerian television game show

- Original logotype of Familetna
- Genre: Game show
- Created by: Mark Goodson
- Based on: Family Feud
- Presented by: Mehdi Adjaout
- Country of origin: Algeria
- Original language: Arabic

Production
- Production locations: Algiers, Algeria
- Camera setup: Multiple

Original release
- Network: Télévision Algérienne; Echorouk TV
- Release: 2014

Familetna (Arabic: فاملتنا, our family) is an Algerian television game shows hosted by Mehdi Adjaout and ran from 2014 to 2018 on Télévision Algérienne, A3 and Canal Algérie, and since 2021 on Echorouk TV.

Familetna is the Algerian version of the French program Une Famille en or, adapted from the original American version Family Feud.

Depends on the competition between two different families, each consisting of five members over the age of 18 years. The program presents different questions from everyday life on both families, it includes four phases in addition to the final stage.

== Terms of the program ==
- The team includes 5 members of the same family.
- The age of each rider is 18 years.

== Gameplay ==
All the questions raised in the program are collected by people from public roads and sidewalks located in the most important cities in Algeria. Namely Algiers, Oran, Biskra and Constantine.

Each question has several answers and each answer carries different points, when asking the questioner to ask, each team leader who knows the answer must press the button to calculate the answer as correct, if the answer has the largest number of points, the answer is counted and the remaining family members are taken to identify the remaining answers, and if the answer of the leader of the team who pressed the button carries the largest number of points, it is given another chance for the leader of the competing family to give the answer, if the latter knows the answer with the highest number of points, it will be easy to pass on to the rest of his family in order to identify the rest of the answers. If the answer is less than the answer of the leader who pressed the button for the first time, in order to complete all the solutions to the question.

When you pass on to a family member whose leader is able to know a particular answer if they give three wrong answers, you will be given a chance to the competing family to give another answer to the question. If a correct answer is found, the family that has identified the answer from the first time loses all its points.

== Stages of the program ==
The program consists of four stages, after which the team that collects the largest number of points will be determined, and then the final stage, which will have five questions to be answered in 20 seconds.

=== The first stage ===
The challenge at this stage is between the leader of each family. The stage contains one question that includes seven answers. Each answer has a different number of points.

=== The second stage ===
The same first stage, however, the challenge is between the first individual of each family and not among the leaders.

=== The third stage ===
The challenge is between the second individual of each family. This stage contains one question that contains six answers and each answer is worth double values.

=== The fourth stage ===
The challenge is between the third individual of each family. This stage contains one question that contains five answers and each answer is worth triple-points.

=== The final ===
After the fourth stage, the family that collected the largest number of points of the birds passed. That family earned 100 dinars for each point. At this stage, the family chooses two of its members. A person is isolated with black glasses and headphones. The other person is left to answer the five questions in 20 seconds. Each question contains different answers but one question contains the largest number of points. "Top answer", when completing the first person answer the five questions are going to the other person who will answer the same questions. The two persons must have a total score of more than or equal to 200 points in addition to their "Top answers".

- 200 points + Top one answer = 100,000 DZD.
- 200 points + 2 Top answers = 200,000 DZD.
- 200 points + 3 Top Answers = 300,000 DZD.
- 200 points + 4 Top Answers = 400,000 DZD.
- 200 points + 5 Top answers = 1,000,000 DZD.
