= Le Bastion 18 : au-delà de la souffrance physique =

2017 Algerian documentary film

- Release dates: 2017
- Country: Algeria

Le Bastion 18 : au-delà de la souffrance physique (in English The Bastion 18: Beyond Physical Suffering) is a 35-minute Algerian historical documentary, directed by journalist Zoheir Bendimerad in 2017, and broadcast on Canal Algérie. The documentary explores the French DOPs (Operational Protection Device), torture centers established in Algeria during the war.

== Synopsis ==
The documentary focuses on the DOPs that were created by the French army after the Battle of Algiers. These torture centers were scattered throughout Algeria, and Le Bastion 18 was one of them, located in the city of Tlemcen in the western part of the country.

At the heart of this documentary is the poignant testimony of Abdesslam Tabet Aoul, who survived the torture inflicted by French soldiers in 1959. With great emotion, he recounts the torture he endured as well as that inflicted upon his fellow cellmates.
