= Hob Fi Kafas El Itiham =

Algerian television soap opera

- Also known as: Love in the dock
- حب في قفص الاتهام
- Genre: Soap opera
- Written by: Ben Sufyan; Zarah laajaimi
- Story by: Soufiane Ben Zarara
- Directed by: Bachir Sellami
- Starring: Sara Lalama; Bahia Rachedi; Amel Himer; Mohammed Adjaimi
- Country of origin: Algeria
- Original language: Arabic
- No. of seasons: 1
- No. of episodes: 30

Production
- Production location: Algeria
- Running time: 45 minutes
- Production company: EPTV GROUP

Original release
- Network: Télévision Algérienne
- Release: 18 June – 16 July 2015

Love in the dock (Arabic: حب في قفص الاتهام; Hob Fi Kafas El Itiham) is an Algerian television soap opera directed by Bachir Sellami. Broadcast from 18 June to 16 July 2015, the show aired on the channel A3 on Télévision Algérienne. The show aired during Ramadan, the month of fasting and religious observance in Islam.

== Premise ==
The series follows Yasmine, a young woman from a respectable, conservative Algerian family. Yasmine travels to the United States to complete her education, but ends up marrying a member of the Algerian American community and becomes pregnant. She returns to Algeria, hiding her marriage and pregnancy from her family.

== Cast ==
- Sara Lalama as Yasmine, (2015)
- Bahia Rachedi
- Amel Himer as Zainab, Yasmine's mother (2015)
- Mohamed Adjaimi as Hussein, Yasmine's father (2015)
- Ammar ?
- Sikritir Mimouni as Tariq
- Mustapha Laribi
- Abdel Nour Ba'omar as Riad
- Louisa Arpag
- Vezah Tokorta
- Nawal Fayza
- Noureddine Boussouf
- Jamal Awan
- Zakaria bin Mohammed
- Amal Hanifa
- Suha Oolhy

== Release ==
The show was released on 18 June 2015 on the channel A3.
