= Hamoudi Messaoudene =

Algerian inventor

Hamoudi Messaoudene is an Algerian inventor from Aures, wilaya of Batna in Algeria, which has to his credit several patents for inventions at the national and international level. His latest invention is a machine that revolutionized the field of agriculture. The latter U-shaped, that when placed around the shaft clears the weeds. Operation known under the term mechanical weeding or hoeing. This invention won him the first prize for the best invention in 2013. He was a guest on several television channels Algerian, including Canal Algerie, where he explains the use of the machine in terms of efficiency and profitability for growers.
