= TV9 (Algerian TV channel) =

Algerian public television channel

- Country: Algeria
- Broadcast area: Worldwide

Programming
- Language: Arabic
- Picture format: 576i SDTV

Ownership
- Owner: EPTV
- Sister channels: TV1; TV2; TV3; TV4; TV5; TV6; TV7; TV8

History
- Launched: 26 May 2021

Links
- Website: www.entv.dz

Availability

Terrestrial
- Digital terrestrial television (Algeria): Channel 9 (SD)

TV9 (in Arabic: الجزائرية التاسعة), also known as El-Barlamaniya TV, is the ninth Algerian national public television channel. It is part of the state-owned EPTV group, along with TV1, TV2, TV3, TV4, TV5, TV6, TV7 and TV8. It is an Arab language channel. TV9 is specialized in covering the Algerian parliament and was inspired by the French channel La Chaîne parlementaire.

== History ==
The project was announced in 2021 and was made final in January 2022, by which time, preparations for its development were in an advanced stage. There were plans to launch it on specific national days, such as 19 March (Victory Day) or 5 July (Independence Day). The project was created to strengthen Algeria's institutional structure, as well asassuring right to information, bringing citizens closer to their legislative institution and strengthen trust between voters and the elected.

TV9 started broadcasting on 26 May 2022, during a ceremony attended by Salah Goudjil, Ibrahim Boughali and Aïmene Benabderrahmane. Although ENTV is responsible for the channel, both legislative chambers supply equipment and programming. Its facilities were inherited from the former Dzaïr TV, which was owned by Ali Haddad.
