= TV7 (Algerian TV channel) =

Algerian public television channel

- Country: Algeria
- Broadcast area: Worldwide

Programming
- Language: Arabic
- Picture format: 576i SDTV

Ownership
- Owner: EPTV
- Sister channels: TV1; TV2; TV3; TV4; TV5; TV6; TV8; TV9

History
- Launched: 19 May 2020; 6 years ago

Links
- Website: www.entv.dz

Availability

Terrestrial
- Digital terrestrial television (Algeria): Channel 7 (SD)

TV7 (in Arabic: الجزائرية السابعة), also known as El maarifa TV (in Arabic: المعرفة), is the seventh Algerian public national television channel. It is part of the state-owned EPTV group, along with TV1, TV2, TV3, TV4, TV5, TV6, TV8 and TV9. It is an Arab language channel. TV7 is specialized in "distance education".

== History ==
TV7 was launched on 19 May 2020, it broadcasts each day from 8 am to midnight.
