= TV8 (Algerian TV channel) =

Algerian public television channel

- Country: Algeria
- Broadcast area: Worldwide

Programming
- Language: Arabic
- Picture format: 576i SDTV

Ownership
- Owner: EPTV
- Sister channels: TV1; TV2; TV3; TV4; TV5; TV6; TV7; TV9

History
- Launched: 12 October 2020

Links
- Website: www.entv.dz

Availability

Terrestrial
- Digital terrestrial television (Algeria): Channel 8 (SD)

TV8 (in Arabic: الجزائرية الثامنة), also known as El-Dhakira TV (in Arabic: الذاكرة), is the eighth Algerian public national television channel. It is part of the state-owned EPTV group, along with TV1, TV2, TV3, TV4, TV5, TV6, TV7 and TV9. It is an Arab language channel. TV8 is specialized in Algerian history.

== History ==
TV8 was launched on 12 October 2020, It broadcasts programs related to the history of Algeria, such as documentaries and historical films.
