= Hadj Sadok Bouziane =

Algerian footballer (born 1987)

Personal information
- Full name: Redouane Bouziane Hadj Sadok
- Date of birth: 4 October 1987 (age 39)
- Place of birth: Sidi Lakhdar, Algeria
- Position: Attacking midfielder

Youth career
- ASO Chlef

Senior career*
| Years | Team | Apps | (Gls) |
| 2007–2009 | ASO Chlef | 10 | (1) |
| 2008–2009 | → USMM Hadjout (loan) | | |
| 2009–2011 | USMM Hadjout | | |
| 2013–2014 | JSM Chéraga | | |
| 2014–2017 | US Boukhadra | | |
| 2017–2020 | CR Zaouia | | |
- * Club domestic league appearances and goals

Hadj Sadok Bouziane (also known as El Hadj Seddouk Bouziane) (born October 4, 1987) is an Algerian football player.

== Career ==
In 2005, he won a television sports reality show called "SoccaStars" (hosted by FutureTV) and was awarded with a one-year contract at the Newcastle United academy. He was chosen as the top player on the show out of 6,000 contestants from all Arab countries, and also won a Toyota SUV. Prior to the competition, he worked as a shepherd and had played football at youth levels. At age 10, he began playing for a local club before eventually joining ASO Chlef's youth setup.

However, visa issues delayed his departure by months. Moreover, whilst waiting for a visa, he sustained a hand injury that necessitated surgery. Yet, the latter was only found to be unsuccessful once he managed to travel to Newcastle. His hand needing two further surgeries to be healed, he did not manage to be fit by the time his contract expired.

In 2007, he signed with the senior team of ASO Chlef. Having only played a handful of games with his team, he signed for third-tier side USMM Hadjout on loan in December 2008.

In 2018, after years spent in the lower leagues, he attracted national attention once again after leading his fifth tier team, CR Zaouia, to the Algerian Cup semi-finals, scoring 5 goals in the process and becoming the competition's top scorer.

== Honours ==
USMM Hadjout:

- Inter-Régions Division: 2008−09 - Centre group
