= TV6 (Algerian TV channel) =

Algerian public television channel

- Country: Algeria
- Broadcast area: Worldwide

Programming
- Languages: Arabic; French
- Picture format: 1080i HDTV (downscaled to 16:9 576i for the SDTV feed)

Ownership
- Owner: EPTV
- Sister channels: TV1; TV2; TV3; TV4; TV5; TV7; TV8; TV9

History
- Launched: 26 March 2020; 6 years ago
- Replaced: TV3 (news programs only)

Links
- Website: www.entv.dz

Availability

Terrestrial
- Digital terrestrial television (Algeria): Channel 6 (SD)

TV6 (in Arabic: الجزائرية السادسة) is the sixth Algerian public national television channel, also called Youth channel (in Arabic: الشبابية). It is part of the state-owned EPTV group, along with TV1, TV2, TV3, TV4, TV5, TV7, TV8 and TV9. It is an Arab language channel and directed to the youth population.

== History ==
TV6 was launched on 26 March 2020 as a variety channel, absorbing most of the programs from TV3's former format. On 31 July 2021, it is changed to be a youth channel dedicated to youth entertainment shows.
