= Berbère Télévision =

- Country: Algeria; France
- Broadcast area: Europe, Americas, Africa, Canada,..
- Headquarters: 1, ter rue du Marais; 93100 Montreuil; France

Programming
- Languages: Berber and French
- Picture format: 4:3 (576i, SDTV)

Ownership
- Owner: BRTV Group
- Sister channels: Berbère Music; Berbère Jeunesse

History
- Launched: May 2012

Links
- Website: Berbère Télévision (french)

Berbère Télévision is a TV channel broadcasting in Tamazight language from Montreuil. Berbère Télévision was set up by BRTV Group.

== History ==
Berbere Television started in January 2000 under the name BRTV (Berber Radio Television). This channel is devoted to the discovery of the Berber world and openness to the world of culture. The channel broadcasts 24 hours a day since spring 2004. The channel has co-produced the film The forgotten hill which is now its property. With the arrival of Berber bouquet on November 25, 2008, Berber TV gave rise to two new TV channels: Berber Music and Berber Youth.

== Programming ==
- Top 10 : Compilation of 10 hit music videos.
