= TV5 (Algerian TV channel) =

Algerian public television channel

- Country: Algeria
- Broadcast area: Worldwide

Programming
- Language: Arabic
- Picture format: 1080i HDTV (downscaled to 16:9 576i for the SDTV feed)

Ownership
- Owner: EPTV
- Sister channels: TV1; TV2; TV3; TV4; TV6; TV7; TV8; TV9

History
- Launched: 18 March 2009

Links
- Website: www.entv.dz

Availability

Terrestrial
- Digital terrestrial television (Algeria): Channel 5 (SD)

Streaming media
- EPTV Live: Watch live

TV5 (in Arabic: الجزائرية الخامسة), also known as Coran TV (in Arabic: قناة القرآن الكريم), is the fifth Algerian public national television channel. It is part of the state-owned Public Establishment of Television, along with TV1, TV2, TV3, TV4, TV6, TV7, TV8 and TV9. It is dedicated to religious programs and Quran.

== History ==
TV5 was launched on 18 March 2009, it has started to broadcast its programmes on the same day. It initially broadcast for eight hours, from 4pm to midnight.
