= 4 March 1956 Stadium =

Multi-use stadium in Tébessa, Algeria

Coordinates: 35.4053°N 8.1163°E

- Interactive map of 4 March 1956 Stadium
- Full name: 4 March 1956 Stadium
- Location: Tébessa, Algeria
- Owner: APC Tébessa
- Operator: US Tébessa
- Capacity: 11,000
- Surface: Artificial turf

Construction
- Opened: 1992
- Renovated: 2012

Tenant
- US Tébessa

4 March 1956 Stadium (Arabic: ملعب 4 مارس 1956), or officially Stade du 4-mars-1956, is a multi-use stadium in Tébessa, Algeria.It is currently used mostly for football matches and athletics stadium is the home ground of US Tébessa. The stadium holds 11,000 spectators.
