= Mohamed Belouizdad =

Algerian politician (1924–1952)

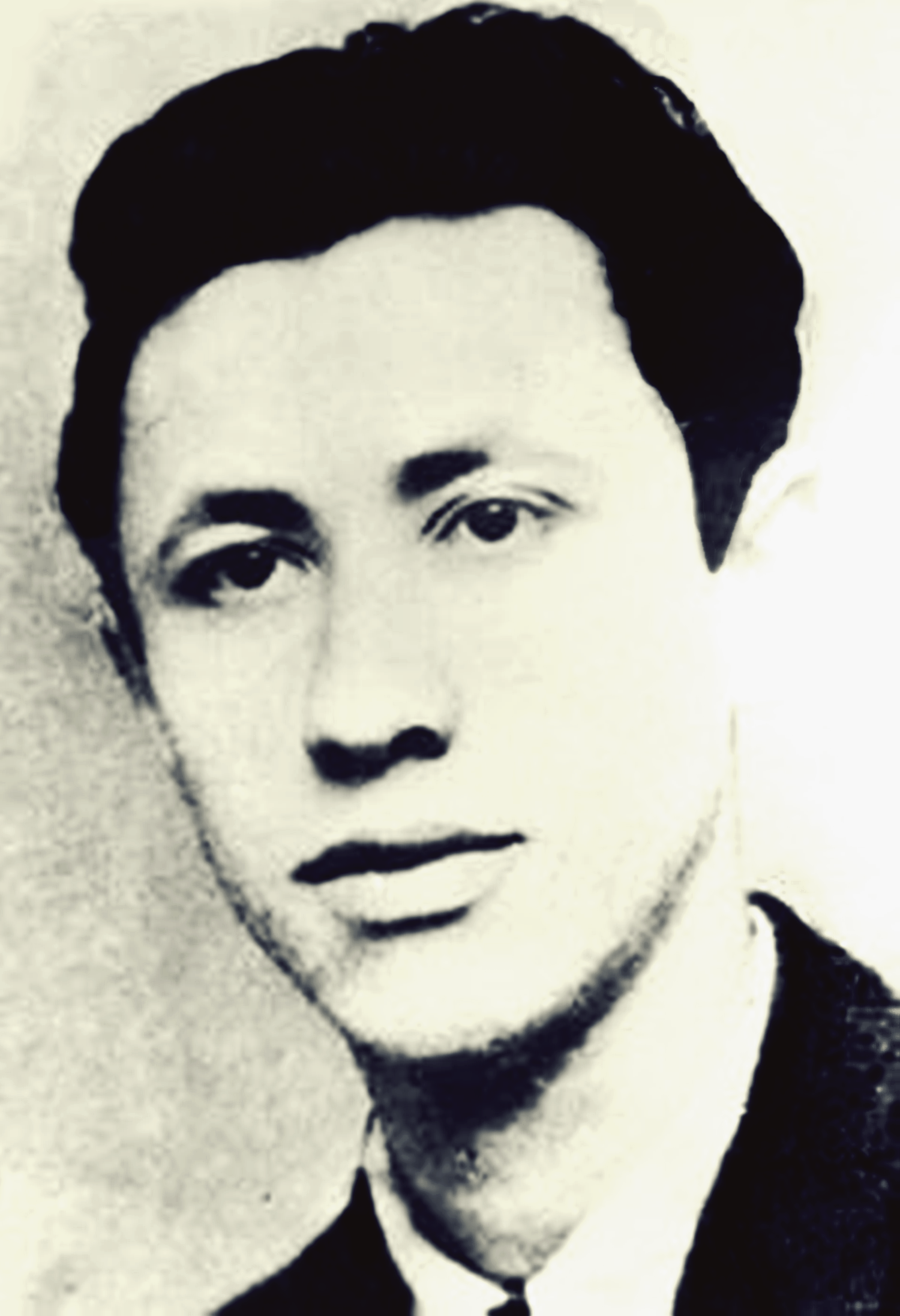
Mohamed Belouizdad

Mohamed Belouizdad (Arabic: محمد بلوزداد; 3 November 1924, in Algiers – 14 January 1952, in Paris), was an Algerian militant and chief "responsible" (manager) of Special Organisation (OS), the military branch of the Algerian People's Party (in French, Parti du Peuple Algerien) (PPA).

He was born in Belcourt, a quarter of Algiers to a family of five brothers and two sisters. Among his siblings were Dr. Mustapha Belouizdad, and Othmane Belouizdad, a member of CRUA and Sahnoun Belouizdad, a militant who died in prison of El Harrach succumbing to torture.

After his studies, in 1944 he worked as a militant of the "Jeune de Belcourt" (CJB) and in the Comité central jeune du Grand Alger (CCJGA), the youth organisation of the Algerian People's Party that saw massive arrests after the great demonstrations of 8 May 1945. In 1947, he was one of the founders of the Special Organisation in opposition to the French occupation of Algeria. Suffering from tuberculosis for many years, he died on 14 January 1952 while in France. His body was returned to Algeria and was buried in Belcourt, in Algiers.

The Algerian government changed the name of the quarter to Mohamed Belouizdad in his honour.

== See also ==
- Declaration of 1 November 1954

== Sources ==
- Yves Courrière, La guerre d'Algérie, Fayard, 2001
