= TV4 (Algerian TV channel) =

Algerian public television channel

- Country: Algeria
- Broadcast area: Worldwide

Programming
- Language: Berber
- Picture format: 1080i HDTV (downscaled to 16:9 576i for the SDTV feed)

Ownership
- Owner: EPTV
- Sister channels: TV1; TV2; TV3; TV5; TV6; TV7; TV8; TV9

History
- Launched: 18 March 2009; 17 years ago

Links
- Website: www.entv.dz

Availability

Terrestrial
- Digital terrestrial television (Algeria): Channel 4 (SD)

Streaming media
- Play TV: Watch live

Alternative Arabic logo of the channel.

TV4 (in Berber languages: ⵜⵉⵍⵉⴱⵉⵣⵢⵓⵏ ⵡⵉⵙ 4, in Arabic: الجزائرية الرابعة), also known as Tamazight TV (in Berber languages: ⵜⴰⵎⴰⵣⵉⵖⵜ, in Arabic: الأمازيغية), is the fourth Algerian public national television channel. It is part of the state-owned EPTV group, along with TV1, TV2, TV3, TV5 and TV6, TV7, TV8 and TV9. It is a channel using the five Berber languages of Algeria which are, by number of speakers, Kabyle, Shawiya, Algerian Tuareg, Shenwa and Mozabite.

== History ==
TV4 was launched on 18 March 2009 and started to broadcast its programs on the same day. At launch, it broadcast for only six hours from 5pm to 11pm.

== Programming ==
=== Sports competitions ===
- Algerian Cup
- Algerian League

=== News programs ===
- ⵉⵙⴰⵍⴻⵏ 18h (Issalen 18h) | Journal 18h en Tamazight (Six O'clock News in Tamazight)
