= TV2 (Algerian TV channel) =

Algerian public television channel

- Country: Algeria
- Broadcast area: Worldwide (including Arab world)

Programming
- Languages: Arabic; French; Tamazight
- Picture format: 1080i HDTV (downscaled to 16:9 576i for the SDTV feed)

Ownership
- Owner: EPTV
- Sister channels: TV1; TV3; TV4; TV5; TV6; TV7; TV8; TV9

History
- Launched: August 1994; 32 years ago

Links
- Website: www.entv.dz

Availability

Terrestrial
- Digital terrestrial television (Algeria): Channel 2 (SD)

Streaming media
- Play TV: Watch live

TV2 (in Arabic: الجزائرية الثانية), formerly Canal Algérie (French pronunciation: [ka.nal' al.ʒe.ʁi]), English for the Algerian channel, is the second Algerian general public national television channel. The channel is part of the EPTV Group which also includes TV1, TV3, TV4, TV5, TV6, TV7, TV8 and TV9. The channel broadcasts its programs 24/7 via different platforms and all over the world.

== Programming ==
=== Programming blocs ===
- Enfants (Children)
- Documentaire (Documentaries)
- Sport (Sports)
- Cinéma (Movies)
- Musiques (Music)

=== News ===
- 12h Journal (Midday News in French)
- ⵉⵙⴰⵍⴻⵏ 18h (Issalen 18h) | 18h Journal (Six o'clock news in Tamazight)
- 19h Journal (Seven o'clock news in French)
- Akhbar Al thamina | أخبار الثامنة (Eight o'clock news in Arabic)
- English News Edition (This newsflash airs late at night)
- Météo (Weather bulletin)

=== Television shows ===
- Afrique Hebdo
- Canal Foot
- Bonjour d'Algérie
- Bonjour week-end
- 52' Chrono
- Sur le fil
- Questions d'actu
- Point culturel
- Twahacht Bladi
- Trésors d'Algérie
- C'est son show !
- Les étoiles de minuit
- Expression livre
- Culture club
- Il était mille fois
- En haut de l'affiche
- Séquences d'archive
- Matière grise
- Le ramadan et le rire
- Avis religieux
- Images d'Algérie
- Paroles de femme
- Culin'Art
- Diasporama
- La semaine éco
- Santé Mag
- Sad Love Story (City Art Production dub)
- Martyrs de la guillotine
- Le sport en questions
- C'est pas sorcier
- Les maximes juridiques
- Algé'rire
- Adventure Time (Image Production House dub)
- The Amazing World of Gumball
- Just for Laughs Gags
- Clang Invasion
- Dora the Explorer
- Looney Tunes
- Garfield and Friends
- Fréquence Musique
- Télérama
- Kappa Mikey (Image Production House dub)
- Tom and Jerry
- Tom and Jerry Tales
- My Life as a Teenage Robot
- Qaada
- Ruby Gloom (Image Production House dub)
- The Simpsons
- SpongeBob SquarePants
- Thomas & Friends (seasons 8-9 dubbed by Super M Productions and seasons 13-15 dubded by Image Production House)
- Xiaqiao Street
- Éscales DZ
- Les nuits sacrées du ramadan
- Dans le sens de l'islam
- Sport week-end
- Familetna

=== Series & soap operas ===
- ‘Imārat al-Hāj Lekhdher
- A‘ṣāb wa Awtār
- Adh-Dhikrá al-Akhīrá
- Aḥlām Mu’ajjalah
- Al-Bedhrah
- Al-Ḥarīq
- Al-Imtiḥān aṣ-Ṣa‘b
- Al-Lā‘ib
- Aṣ-Ṣāḥah
- Axxam n Dda Mezian
- Bin'o Bine
- Bint Walad
- Bibiche w Bibicha
- Chahra
- Caméra Café
- Dhākirat al-Jassad
- Djemai Family
- Dumū‘ al-Qalb
- Hob Fi Kafas El Itiham
- Koul Chi Aâdi
- Kouloub Fi Siraa
- Le Joueur
- Nass Mlah City
- Nūr al-Fajr
- Qahwet Mīmūn
- Qulūb fī Sirā‘
- Qulūb Taḥt ar-Ramād
- Rendez-vous avec le destin
- Saad El-Gat
- Samt El Abriyaa
- sihr el mordjane
- Shitā’ Bārid
- Sūq al-Hāj Lekhdher
- Taht El Moura9aba
- Qoloub Tahta Ramad
- Boudhou (Algeria)
- Switchers (Algeria)
- Shafiqa
- Al michwar

=== Animes ===
- Adventures of the Little Koala
- Go for Speed
- Zoids: Genesis
- Kabutoborg
- Mega Man Star Force
- Chaechaepong Kimchi Pong
- Pikachin Kit
- Pokémon
- Seer
- Animal Detective Kiruminzoo

=== Indian Movies ===
- Sasural
- Khamoshi
- Nagin
- Coolie
- Mard
- Woh 7 Din
- Allah Rakha
- Bekaraar
- Jhutha Sach
- Mashal
- Doosra Aadmi
- Mohabbat Zindagi Hai

=== Documentaries ===
- The Gurus Explore

=== Sports competitions ===
- Algerian Football Cup
- Algerian Ligue Professionnelle 1
- Algerian Ligue 2
- Algerian Basketball Cup

== On air staff ==
- Radia Boulmaali

== Logos ==
1999-2009

2009-2019

== See also ==
- Public Establishment of Television
- Television in Algeria
- List of French language television channels
