= TV1 (Algerian TV channel) =

Algerian public television channel

- Country: Algeria
- Broadcast area: Nationwide
- Headquarters: Algiers

Programming
- Languages: Arabic; Berber; French
- Picture format: 1080i HDTV (downscaled to 16:9 576i for the SDTV feed)

Ownership
- Owner: EPTV
- Sister channels: TV2; TV3; TV4; TV5; TV6; TV7; TV8; TV9

History
- Launched: 24 December 1956; 69 years ago
- Former names: RTF Television Algiers (1956–1962); Algerian Television (1962–2001); The Terrestrial Channel (2001–2020)

Links
- Website: entv.dz

Availability

Terrestrial
- Digital terrestrial television (Algeria): Channel 1 (HD)

TV1 (in Arabic: الجزائرية الأولى, romanized: al-Jazā’iriyyah al-’Ūlā), formerly Algerian Television (in Arabic: التلفزيون الجزائري) then The Terrestrial Channel (in Arabic: القناة الأرضية), is the first Algerian general public network of Établissement public de télévision (EPTV) formerly Établissement national de télévision (ENTV), along with TV2, TV3, TV4, TV5, TV6, TV7, TV8 and TV9.

It began broadcasting on 24 December 1956, during the French colonial period in Algeria. It is one of the most important television channels in Algeria, and produces entertainment and variety programs in addition to several Algerian series and films. Its main headquarters are in Algiers.

== History ==
=== RTF ===
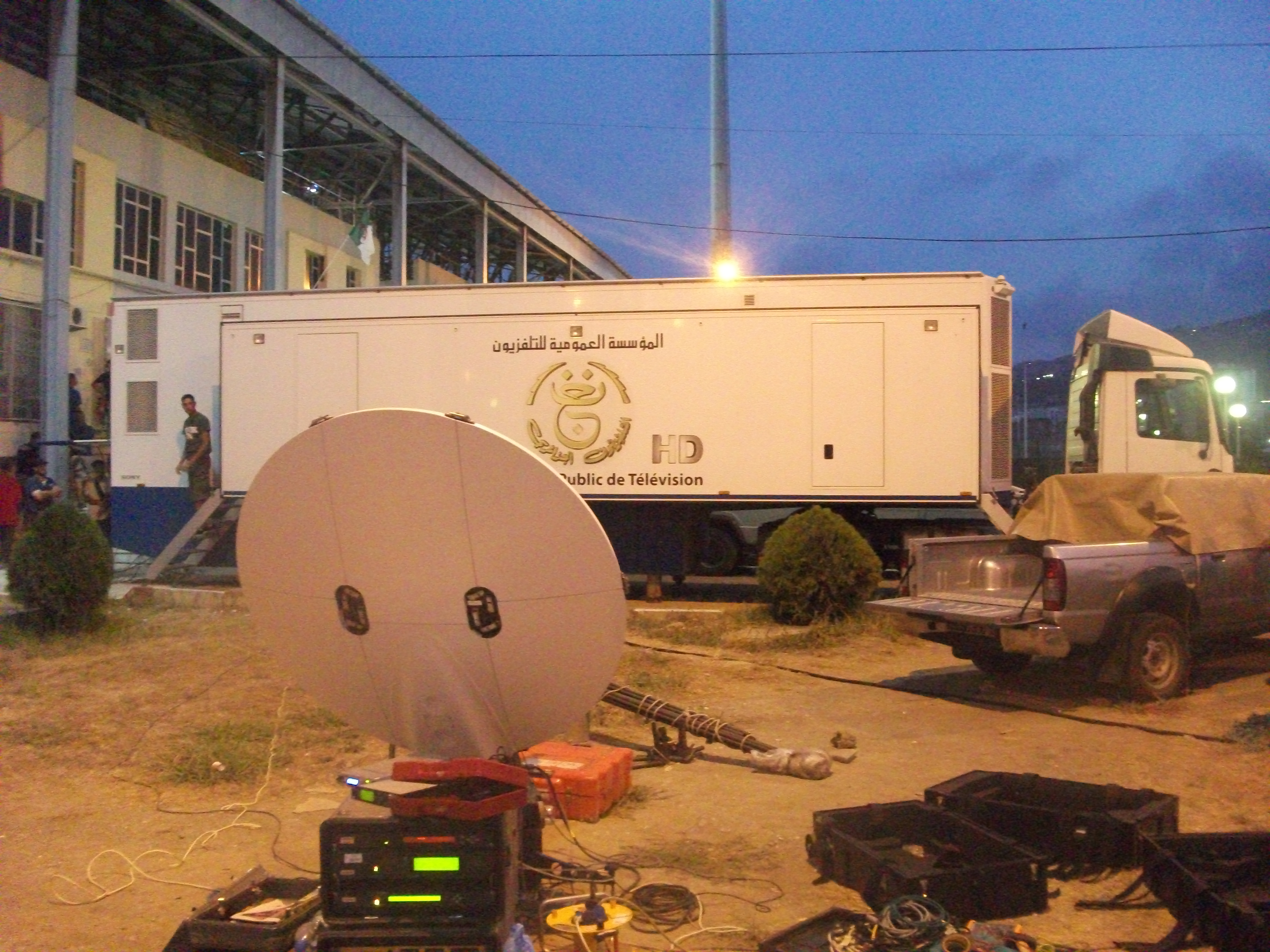
EPTV GROUP mobile unit, capable of broadcasting in high definition

A television station for French Algeria was set up on 1 December 1954. It became the second television station in Africa to be established, after the ill-fated TELMA which existed from 1954 to 1955. The set-up began when a single Cameflex camera, used for reporting current events for newsreels, was used for the purpose of making short films what would air on the future Algerian television station. The upcoming station would provide programs for both target groups, the French (with programs coming in from metropolitan France) and the local Muslim population, the latter consisting mostly of local artists such as Rouiched, Reda Falaki, Mustapha Badi and Boualem Rais, coming mainly from the Mahieddine troop. These artists already had scripts ready for sketch segments. A substantial number of short films from directors such as Mustapha Gribi and Mohamed Touri were filmed in 1955 and 1956, using them to stock for the launch of the station.

The Radiodiffusion-Télévision Française began the broadcasting of Télévision Algérienne on 24 December 1956 in the French departments of Algeria by inaugurating its first 819-line VHF television transmitter installed at Cap Matifou, costing 1,2 billion francs, in front of Algiers, that is retired of fifteen kilometers of distance. The initial output of the Matifou transmitter was of 3 kW, later increased to 29 kW in May 1957. RTF Télévision's Algerian station becomes the first bilingual (French and Arabic) television station. The French-speaking and Arabic-speaking announcers took turns sharing the presentation of the programs, some appearing live on screen while others only did voice-over translation, and in the opposite languages the next day. Launch day featured a special presentation directed by Mustapha Gribi. Programs are entirely produced on location, initially with no relay being possible with the French mainland. Thirty-one hours of programs were broadcast each week in 1957, consisting of films, theater, music and lyrical works, variety shows, news, sports magazines and reports and children's programs. Metropolitan television provided 11 out of those 31 weekly hours of programs, mainly theater, variety and lyrical works. The television news was broadcast at 8pm and repeated at 10:30pm and was presented by Jean Luc, Jean Lanzi, Jean-Claude Narcy and Jean-Pierre Elkabbach. It is produced entirely on site using tapes sent by United Press and France Video to which are two or three locally filmed reports were added each day, with commentary in French and Arabic for simultaneous broadcast on the two sound channels. Numerous programs (musical, folkloric, children's broadcasts, concerts and theater) and short films are specially created to feed the schedule of Arabic-speaking broadcasts placed under the direction of Fathallah Benhassine, already responsible for broadcasts in Arabic and Kabyle on RTF radio, France V.

A second transmitter was installed under the guidance of RTF Director-General Gebriel Delaunay on 22 February 1958, to cover Alger better. A direct link was established from the French mainland to Algeria on 14 July 1960 (Bastille Day) and its regular broadcasts started by year-end 1960. Regarding its financing, it was up to metropolitan France to do so, and the royalties from Algerians was only a small fraction of the operating costs.

=== After independence ===
Établissement national de télévision, the owner of Télévision Algérienne, is the most important media organ in Algeria. It is a public information and communication institution that carries out the main tasks determined by a book of conditions whereby it monitors the official activities of state institutions by reporting and broadcasting as required by the public interest of the country. The sovereignty of the Establishment was restored from the French colonization on 28 October 1962, after the independence of Algeria on 5 July 1962. A post-independence protocol between ENTV and its French counterpart was signed on 23 January 1963, eyeing technical cooperation between the two sides. That same year, ENTV opened itself to advertising, following the passage of a decree in August that year.

In 1973, RTA withdraws the French 819-line television standard and converts itself to the European 625-line standard, in anticipation for color television.

Télévision Algérienne was the only national television channel in Algeria until 1994 when Canal Algérie (now TV2), a French version of its main channel, using the Hot Bird and Astra satellites, was launched for Algerian immigrants who wanted news of the bled (homeland). On 5 July 2001, a third channel A3, joined the ensemble, followed on 18 March 2009 by two new channels: Channel 4 and Coran TV.

== Evolution of network names ==
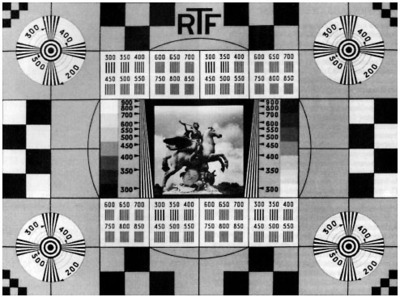
Former 819-line "Marly Horses" test card used during French colonial era

- 1956–1962: R.T.F. Télévision Alger (means: R.T.F. Algiers Television)
- 1962–1986: الإذاعة والتلفزيون الجزائري (DIN 31635: āl-idaā wā ātilifizyoun al-Jazā’iri (means: Algerian Radio and Television)
- 1986–present: التلفزيون الجزائري (DIN 31635: ātilifizyoun al-Jazā’iri, means: Algerian Television)

== Programming ==
Télévision Algérienne programs consist of informing, educating and distracting by broadcasting all reports, programs and programs relating to national, regional, local and international life, as well as current issues and problems.

=== Foreign TV series ===
- 100 Deeds for Eddie McDowd
- Adventure Time (Image Production House dub)
- The Amazing World of Gumball
- Blazing Teens
- Clang Invasion
- Dora the Explorer
- Garfield and Friends
- Kappa Mikey (Image Production House dub)
- Looney Tunes
- My Life as a Teenage Robot
- Ruby Gloom (Image Production House dub)
- SpongeBob SquarePants
- Thomas & Friends (seasons 8-9 dubbed by Super M Productions and seasons 13-15 dubded by Image Production House)
- Tom and Jerry

=== Animes ===
- Chibi Maruko-chan

=== Sport ===
==== Multi-sport event ====
- Olympic Games
- Mediterranean Games
- Diamond League

==== Football ====
- Ligue 1 Mobilis
- Algerian Cup
- Algeria national football team matches
- FIFA World Cup
- FIFA Arab Cup
- Africa Cup of Nations
- CAF Champions League
- CAF Confederation Cup

==== Handball ====
- Algerian Handball Championship
- Algerian Handball Cup
- Algeria men's national handball team matches
- African Men's Handball Championship

==== Basketball ====
- Algerian Basketball Cup
