= Public Establishment of Television =

Algerian public service television broadcaster

Coordinates: 36°44′53″N 3°03′04″E

Public Establishment of Television (EPTV)
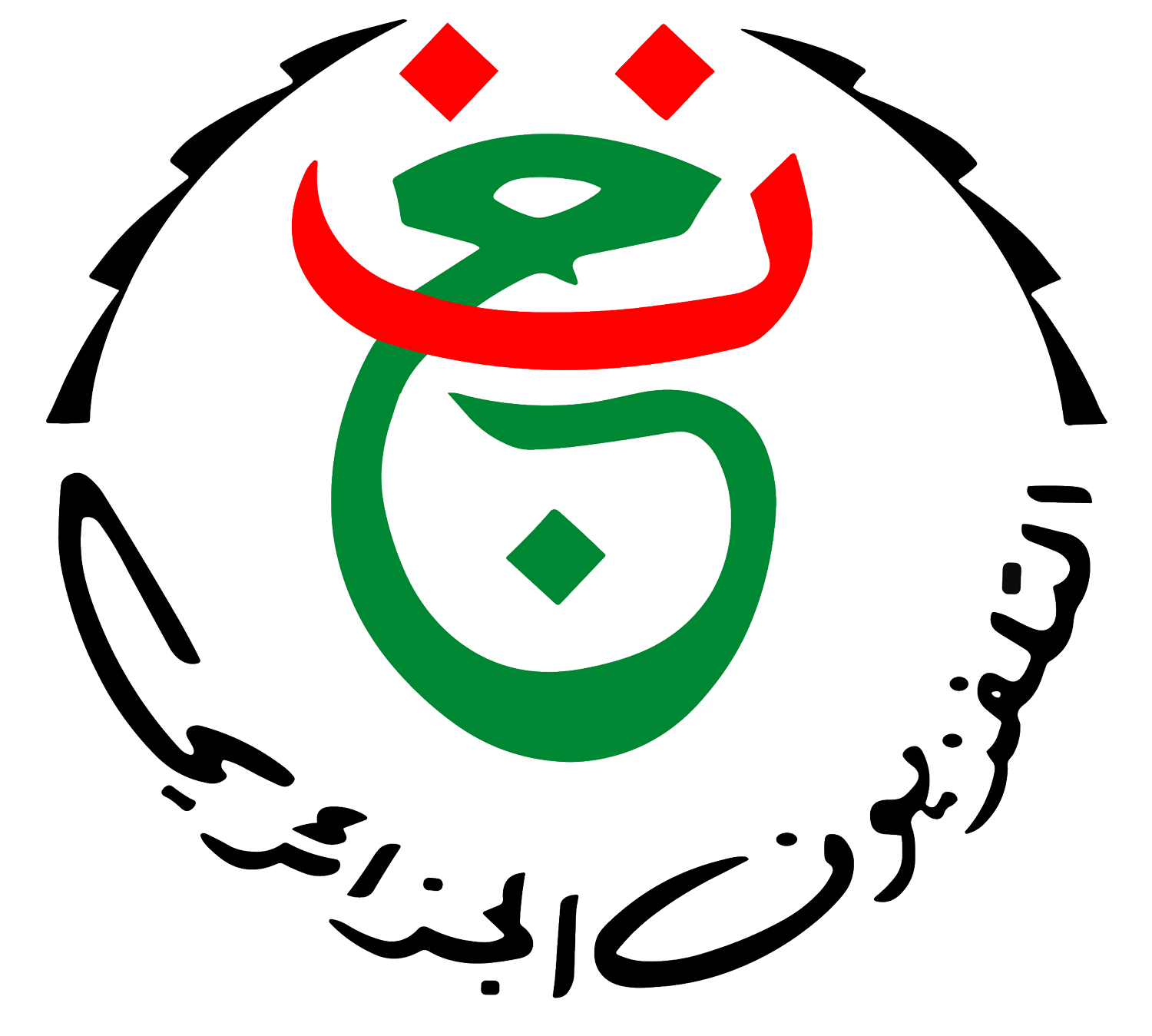
- Formerly: 1962–1986: Algerian Radio and Television Broadcasting (RTA); 1986–1991: National Establishment of Television (ENTV)
- Type: Établissement public à caractère industriel et commercial (EPIC)
- Industry: Television
- Predecessor: Algerian Radio and Television Broadcasting (RTA, 1962–1986)
- Founded: 24 December 1956; 69 years ago (as RTF Télévision Alger); 28 October 1962; 63 years ago (as RTA); 1 July 1986; 40 years ago (as ENTV); 24 April 1991; 35 years ago (as EPTV)
- Headquarters: 21 Martyrs Boulevard, PB 148 El Mouradia, Algiers, Algeria
- Areas served: North Africa; Middle East; Europe; North America
- Key people: Directors-general: Abdou Benziane (1990–1992, 1993–1994); Habib Chawki Hamraoui (1998–2008); Abdelkader Leulmi (2008–2012); Tewfik Khelladi (2012–2019); Lotfi Cheriet (2019–2019); Salim Rebbahi (2019–2020); Ahmed Bensebbane (2020–2021); Chaabane Lounakel (2021–present)
- Services: TV network, stations and channels; TV programmes; website
- Owner: Government of Algeria
- Parent: Radiodiffusion-Télévision Française (1956–1962)
- Subsidiaries: TV1; TV2; TV3; TV4; TV5; TV6; TV7; TV8; TV9

Standard Arabic
- Abjad: المُؤٙسّٙسٙة العُمُومِيّٙة لِلتِّلِفِزْيُون
- Romanization: Al-Mu’assasa al-‘Umūmiyya li-t-Tilivizyūn

Tamazight
- Tifinagh: ⵜⴻⵕⵎⵉⵙⵜ ⵜⴰⵏⴰⴳⴷⵓⴷⵜ ⵏ ⵜⵍⵉⵥⵔⵉ
- Latin: Teṛmist tanagdudt n Tliẓri
- Abjad: ثڕميسث ثاناڨذوذث ن ثليژري

French
- French: Établissement public de télévision
- Audio
- Acronym: EPTV
- Website: www.entv.dz

Public Establishment of Television (Arabic: المؤسّسة العمومية للتلفزيون, French: Établissement public de télévision French pronunciation), abbreviated as EPTV, is a state-owned company that manages the activity of television in Algeria, going from production to broadcasting.

It is the oldest broadcasting service in the country. It currently operates an eponymous television network TV1, eight television channels – TV2, TV3, TV4 Tamazight, Coran TV5, TV6, TV7, TV8, TV9.

EPTV is an active member of the European Broadcasting Union (EBU) and Arab States Broadcasting Union (ASBU). It is also a shareholder in Euronews SA.

== Network and programming ==
=== TV1 ===
TV1 is the first Algerian general public network of Public Establishment of Television group (EPTV in French), has started to broadcast its programs on 24 December 1956 during the French colonial period in Algeria. It is one of the most important television channels in Algeria. It produces entertainment and variety programs, in addition to several Algerian series and films.

=== TV2 ===
EPTV was the only television channel until 1994, when French-speaking Canal Algérie (now TV2) was created.

TV2 is available in Europe on Eutelsat satellite service (Hotbird and Astra).

It is also available on French Numericable, Monaco MC Cable cable television services, Orange TV and Freebox.

=== TV3 ===
On 5 July 2001, EPTV launched a new Arabic language channel for the Arab world to give an institutional image of Algeria. On 28 October 2015, the channel started broadcasting its programs in HD.

=== TV4 ===
On 18 March 2009, EPTV launched a new Berber language channel called TV4, also referred to as Tamazight TV. The channel offers programs in Kabyle, Chaoui, Tumzabt, Chenoui and Tuareg.

=== TV5 ===
On 18 March 2009, EPTV launched a new Religious channel called TV5, also referred to as Coran TV.

=== TV6 ===
On 26 March 2020, EPTV launched a new channel called TV6. The channel is aimed primarily at families and absorbed the content that was formerly carried by TV3 before becoming a predominantly news channel.

=== TV7 ===
On 19 May 2020, EPTV launched an educational channel called TV7. Before then, educational programming was carried on TV6.

=== TV8 ===
On 12 October 2020, EPTV launched a new channel called TV8.

=== TV9 ===
On 26 May 2022, EPTV launched a new channel called TV9. The channel covers proceedings from the Algerian parliament.

=== TV10 (planned) ===
EPTV plans to create a tenth channel, a sports channel, during 2025, under the control of the Ministry of Sports. If approved, most of the sporting events will move from TV6 to the new channel.

== Programming ==
Télévision Algérienne programs consist of informing, educating and distracting by broadcasting all reports, programs and programs relating to national, regional, local and international life, as well as current issues and problems.

== See also ==
- Television in Algeria
