= TV3 (Algerian TV channel) =

Algerian public television channel

- Country: Algeria
- Broadcast area: Worldwide

Programming
- Language: Arabic
- Picture format: 720p/1080i HDTV (downscaled to 16:9 576i for the SDTV feed)

Ownership
- Owner: EPTV
- Sister channels: TV1; TV2; TV4; TV5; TV6; TV7; TV8; TV9

History
- Launched: 5 July 2001; 25 years ago
- Replaced by: TV6 (entertainment programs only)
- Former names: Algeria 3 (2001–2020)

Links
- Website: www.entv.dz

Availability

Terrestrial
- Digital terrestrial television (Algeria): Channel 3 (SD)

Streaming media
- EPTV Live: Watch live

TV3 (in Arabic: الجزائرية الثالثة), also known as El Ikhbariya (in Arabic: الجزائرية الإخبارية) and formerly Algeria 3 (or simply A3), is the third Algerian public national television news channel. It is part of the state-owned EPTV group, along with TV1, TV2, TV4, TV5, TV6, TV7, TV8 and TV9. It is an Arab language channel dedicated for news.

== History ==
Former logo (2007-2019)

TV3 was launched on 5 July 2001, and it initially consisted of children's programming. On 28 October 2015, the channel has started broadcasting its programs in HD.

On 26 March 2020, TV3 became a news channel, with the rest of the programming being moved to a newly-created network around the same time.

== Programming ==
=== Lifestyle and variety shows ===
- ALG DZ Comedy Show (ديزاد كوميدي شو; 2017)
- ALG Our Family (فاملتنا; 2016)
- ALG Medical Advices (إرشادات طبية)

=== Anime ===
- A-Jang.Com (Both Arabic Ehden Studio And Korean Dubs)
- Animal Detective Kiruminzoo (Both Arabic Super M Productions And Japanese Dubs)
- Allison & Lillia (Neo Productions Dubs)
- Armor Hero (Both Arabic Super M Productions And Chinese Dubs)
- Slam Dunk
- B-Daman Crossfire (City Art Production dub)
- Blazing Teens (Both Arabic Super M Productions Dub Chinese)
- Chaechaepong Kimchi Pong (Both Arabic Near East Artistic Production And Korean dub)
- Clamp School Detectives (City Art Production Dub)
- Dragon Warrior (Both Arabic Super M Productions And Chinese Dubs)
- Gad Guard (City Art For Artistic Production And Distribution dub)
- Galaxy Race (Both Arabic Super M Productions And Dubs Chinese)
- Go for Speed (Both Arabic City Art For Artistic Production And Distribution And Media International Picture dub Chinese)
- Higurashi When They Cry
- Jang Geum's Dream (Both Arabic Mash Production Dub Korean)
- Jewelpet (Both Arabic Super M Productions And Japanese Dubs)
- Artificial Insect Kabutoborg VxV (Both Arabic Video 2000 And English Dub)
- King of Taekwondo Kang Tae Poong (Ehden Studio Dub)
- Koongya Restaurant (Both Arabic Ehden Studio And Korean Dubs)
- Masked Rider Ryuki (Both Arabic Video 2000 And Japanese Dubs)
- Mega Man Star Force (Both Arabic City Art For Artistic Production And Distribution And Dubs Japanese)
- Monsuno (Union Media dub)
- Mujin Wakusei Survive (City Art For Artistic Production And Distribution Dub)
- Nana Moon (Both Arabic Super M Productions And Chinese Dubs)
- Net Ghost PiPoPa (Super M Productions Dub)
- RAGNAROK THE AMINATION
- Zoids: Genesis (Both Arabic Video 2000 And Dubs Japanese)
- Tanken Driland (Super M Productions Dub)

=== Cartoons ===
- Adventure Time (Image Production House dub)
- The Amazing World of Gumball
- Bernard
- Ben 10
- Bazing Team (Both Arabic Union Media And English Dubs)
- Bumper King Zapper (Both Arabic Super M Productions And Korean Dubs)
- CatDog (Image Production House dub)
- Caty's
- Chowder
- Clang Invasion
- Courage the Cowardly Dog
- Dexter's Laboratory (Image Production House dub)
- Dora the Explorer
- Dragon Ball
- Dude That's My Ghost
- Fireman Sam (Image Production House dub)
- Fruity Robo (both Arabic Neo Productions And Chinese dub)
- Garfield and Friends
- Hey Arnold!
- The Jetsons
- Kappa Mikey (Image Production House dub)
- Looney Tunes
- Maëlys Mystères (Both Arabic Union Media And Dubs French)
- Mickey Mouse Cartoon (Video 2000 dub)
- My Life as a Teenage Robot
- Oggy and the Cockroaches
- Oscar's Oasis
- The Powerpuff Girls (Image Production House dub)
- Robotboy
- Ruby Gloom (Image Production House dub)
- Seer (Both Arabic Union Media and Dubs Chinese)
- Speed King Bungai
- SpongeBob SquarePants
- Talking Tom Heroes (Union Media Dub)
- Thomas & Friends (seasons 8-9 dubbed by Super M Productions and seasons 13-15 dubded by Image Production House)
- Tom and Jerry
- Tom and Jerry Tales
- Uncle Grandpa
- Vilddyr (Both Arabic Green Caption And Danish dubs)
- What's New, Scooby-Doo?
- Xiaqiao Street (Both Arabic Union Media and Dubs Chinese)
- Zig and Sharko

=== Soap operas ===
- ALG An Accused Love (حب في قفص الاتهام; 2015)
- JOR Al Mergāb (المرقاب; 2017)
- TUR Beni Affet (سامحيني; 2014–2015)
- ALG Cold Winter (شتاء بارد)
- ALG Hearts Under Ash (قلوب تحت الرماد; 2016)
- PRC The Legend of Bruce Lee (أسطورة بروس لي; 2016)
- ALG Switchers (سويتشرز)

=== Others ===
- ALG A Book on A3 (كتاب على الثالثة; 2016)

=== Sports competitions ===
- Algerian Cup
- Algerian Ligue Professionnelle 1
- Algerian Ligue Professionnelle 2
