= 2016–17 DRB Tadjenanet season =

DRB Tadjenanet
2016–17 season
- Head coach: Liamine Bougherara (until 31 March 2017); Meziane Ighil (from 3 April 2017)
- Stadium: Lahoua Smaïl Stadium, Tadjenanet
- Ligue 1: 10th
- Algerian Cup: Round of 64
- Top goalscorer: League: Youcef Chibane (7 goals); All: Youcef Chibane (7 goals)

In the 2016–17 season, DRB Tadjenanet is competing in the Ligue 1 for the 2nd season, as well as the Algerian Cup.

== Non-competitive ==
=== Overview ===
Competition	Record							
Competition	G	W	D	L	GF	GA	GD	Win %
Ligue 1	30	10	9	11	33	32	+1	33.33
Algerian Cup	1	0	0	1	0	1	−1	0.00
Total	31	10	9	12	33	33	+0	32.26

Competition	Start round	Final position/round	First match	Last match
Ligue 1	—N/a	10th	20 August 2016	14 June 2017
Algerian Cup	Round of 64		24 November 2016	

== League table ==
Pos	Team	Pld	W	D	L	GF	GA	GD	Pts	Qualification or relegation
8	NA Hussein Dey	30	11	7	12	38	37	+1	40 (Note: MC Oran ahead of NA Hussein Dey on head-to-head record: MCO–NAH 1–0, NAH–MCO 1–0 however goal difference in the first leg MCO (+7) NAH (+2).)	Qualification for 2017 Arab Club Championship
9	CS Constantine	30	10	9	11	34	33	+1	39 (Note: DRB Tadjenanet ahead of CS Constantine on head-to-head record: CSC–DRB 4–2, DRB–CSC 1–0.)	
10	DRB Tadjenanet	30	10	9	11	33	32	+1	39	
11	JS Kabylie	30	8	14	8	20	24	−4	38 (Note: JS Kabylie ahead of Olympique de Médéa on head-to-head record: JSK–OMM 0–1, OMM–JSK 1–2.)	
12	Olympique de Médéa	30	10	8	12	32	40	−8	38	

Updated to match(es) played on 14 June 2017. Source: DZFoot
Rules for classification: 1) points; 2) head-to-head points; 3) head-to-head goal difference; 4) goal difference; 5) total goals; 6) fairplay ranking; 7) playoff.

=== Results summary ===
Overall								Home						Away					
Pld	W	D	L	GF	GA	GD	Pts	W	D	L	GF	GA	GD	W	D	L	GF	GA	GD
30	10	9	11	33	32	+1	39	9	4	2	18	7	+11	1	5	9	15	25	−10

Last updated: 30 January 2016.
Source: Competitive matches

=== Results by round ===
Round	1	2	3	4	5	6	7	8	9	10	11	12	13	14	15	16	17	18	19	20	21	22	23	24	25	26	27	28	29	30
Ground	H	A	H	H	A	H	A	H	A	H	A	H	A	H	A	A	H	A	A	H	A	H	A	H	A	H	A	H	A	H
Result	W	D	D	W	L	L	L	W	L	L	D	W	L	D	L	L	D	D	L	W	L	W	D	D	L	W	W	W	D	W
Position	2	2	5	4	6	7	9	7	10	11	13	7	9	10	10	13	14	14	15	13	14	13	13	13	13	13	11	10	12	10

Updated to match(es) played on 30 January 2016. Source: Competitive matches
A = Away; H = Home; W = Win; D = Draw; L = Loss

=== Matches ===
Win Draw Loss

20 August 2016 Round 1	DRB Tadjenanet	2 – 0	JS Saoura	Tadjenanet
17:30	Aib 77'; Chettal 87'	Soccerway report Live TV: None		Stadium: Lahoua Smaïl Stadium; Referee: Lotfi Bekouassa

27 August 2016 Round 2	MO Béjaïa	2 – 2	DRB Tadjenanet	Béjaïa
19:00	Bencherifa 44'; Messaâdia 79'	Report; Live TV: None	1' Chettal; 90' Chibane	Stadium: Stade de l'Unité Maghrébine; Referee: Mohamed Boukhalfa

9 September 2016 Round 3	DRB Tadjenanet	0 – 0	USM Alger	Tadjenanet
17:00		Report; Live TV: EPTV Terrestre / TV Tamazight 4		Stadium: Lahoua Smaïl Stadium; Referee: Lahlou Benbraham

17 September 2016 Round 4	DRB Tadjenanet	2 – 1	RC Relizane	Tadjenanet
16:30	Djahel 39', 49'	Report; Live TV: None	71' Benayad	Stadium: Lahoua Smaïl Stadium; Referee: Merzak Halalchi

23 September 2016 Round 5	CS Constantine	4 – 2	DRB Tadjenanet	Constantine
17:00	Sameur 20'; Meghni 53' (pen.); Aoudia 65'; Belameiri 90'	Report; Live TV: EPTV Terrestre / TV Tamazight 4	16' Chettal; 42' Chibane	Stadium: Stade Mohamed Hamlaoui; Referee: Mustapha Ghorbal

30 September 2016 Round 6	DRB Tadjenanet	1 – 2	CR Belouizdad	Tadjenanet
16:00	Nazouani 73'	Report; Live TV: EPTV Terrestre / Canal Algérie	36' Rebih; 65' Bouchema	Stadium: Lahoua Smaïl Stadium; Referee: Mustapha Bessiri

15 October 2016 Round 7	USM El Harrach	1 – 0	DRB Tadjenanet	El Harrach
16:00	Younès 80'	Report; Live TV: None		Stadium: Stade 1er Novembre 1954; Referee: Abderrezzak Arab

22 October 2016 Round 8	DRB Tadjenanet	1 – 0	Olympique de Médéa	Tadjenanet
15:00	Cheniguer 1'	Report; Live TV: None		Stadium: Lahoua Smaïl Stadium; Referee: Mehdi Abid Charef

29 October 2016 Round 9	USM Bel-Abbès	3 – 1	DRB Tadjenanet	Sidi Bel Abbès
16:00	Balegh 34', 45'; El Amali 47'	Report; Live TV: Algérie 3	31' (pen.) El Moudene	Stadium: Stade 24 Fevrier 1956; Referee: Lotfi Bekouassa

5 November 2016 Round 10	DRB Tadjenanet	0 – 1	MC Alger	Tadjenanet
15:30		Report; Live TV: TV Tamazight 4	35' Nekkache	Stadium: Lahoua Smaïl Stadium; Referee: Boubekeur Zouaoui

10 November 2016 Round 11	JS Kabylie	1 – 1	DRB Tadjenanet	Tizi Ouzou
17:00	Mebarki 90+4'	Report; Live TV: TV Tamazight 4 / Canal Algérie	40' Chibane	Stadium: Stade 1er Novembre 1954; Referee: Mustapha Ghorbal

19 November 2016 Round 12	DRB Tadjenanet	4 – 1	CA Batna	Tadjenanet
15:00	Chibane 20'; Nazouani 44'; Aib 73'; El Moudene 75'	Report; Live TV: None	40' Hadj Aïssa	Stadium: Lahoua Smaïl Stadium; Referee: Mohamed Benouza

3 December 2016 Round 13	NA Hussein Dey	2 – 1	DRB Tadjenanet	Mohamed Belouizdad
16:00	Gasmi 14'; Khiat 66'	Report; Live TV: Canal Algérie	52' (pen.) Chibane	Stadium: August 20, 1955 Stadium; Referee: Abderrezzak Arab

10 December 2016 Round 14	DRB Tadjenanet	1 – 1	MC Oran	Tadjenanet
15:00	Chibane 24' (pen.)	Report; Live TV: None	43' Souibaâh	Stadium: Lahoua Smaïl Stadium; Referee: Merzak Halalchi

23 December 2016 Round 15	ES Sétif	1 – 0	DRB Tadjenanet	Sétif
16:00	Djahnit 23'	Report; Live TV: TV Tamazight 4 / Algérie 3		Stadium: Stade 8 Mai 1945; Referee: Mohamed Benouza

21 January 2017 Round 16	JS Saoura	2 – 1	DRB Tadjenanet	Béchar
18:00	Djallit 50' (pen.), 85'	Report; Live TV: None	90' Djahel	Stadium: August 20, 1955 Stadium; Referee: Mohamed Gritli

24 March 2017 Round 17	DRB Tadjenanet	1 – 1	MO Béjaïa	Tadjenanet
16:00; Match rescheduled due to share some of their players in the African Cup and World Cup military	Chibane 19' (pen.)	Report; Live TV: EPTV Terrestre / TV Tamazight 4	29' Messadia	Stadium: Lahoua Smaïl Stadium; Referee: Hamza Bouslimani

3 February 2017 Round 18	USM Alger	0 – 0	DRB Tadjenanet	Bologhine
16:00		Report; Live TV: TV Tamazight 4		Stadium: Omar Hamadi Stadium; Referee: Mohamed Boukhalfa

11 February 2017 Round 19	RC Relizane	3 – 1	DRB Tadjenanet	Relizane
15:00	Belmokhtar 18'; Derrag 38'; Meziane 90'	Report; Live TV: Algérie 3	65' Guerabis	Stadium: Stade Tahar Zoughari; Referee: Lahlou Benbraham

17 February 2017 Round 20	DRB Tadjenanet	1 – 0	CS Constantine	Tadjenanet
15:00	Demane 76'	Report; Live TV: EPTV Terrestre / TV Tamazight 4		Stadium: Lahoua Smaïl Stadium; Referee: Marzouk Brahimi

25 February 2017 Round 21	CR Belouizdad	1 – 0	DRB Tadjenanet	Mohamed Belouizdad
16:00	Feham 90+5' (pen.)	Report; Live TV: Canal Algérie		Stadium: August 20, 1955 Stadium; Referee: Abderrezzak Arab

4 March 2017 Round 22	DRB Tadjenanet	1 – 0	USM El Harrach	Tadjenanet
15:00	Djahel 3'	Report; Live TV: None		Stadium: Lahoua Smaïl Stadium; Referee: Mustapha Bessiri

10 March 2017 Round 23	Olympique de Médéa	1 – 1	DRB Tadjenanet	Médéa
16:00	Boukhenchouche 39'	Report; Live TV: None	89' Meftahi	Stadium: Stade Imam Lyes de Médéa; Referee: Lotfi Bekouassa

18 March 2017 Round 24	DRB Tadjenanet	0 – 0	USM Bel-Abbès	Tadjenanet
16:00		Report; Live TV: None		Stadium: Lahoua Smaïl Stadium; Referee: Ahmed Bouzrar

6 May 2017 Round 25	MC Alger	2 – 1	DRB Tadjenanet	Algiers
16:00	Zerdab 13'; Derrardja 78'	Report; Live TV: TV Tamazight 4	63' Terbah	Stadium: July 5, 1962 Stadium; Referee: Mohamed Boukhalfa

13 May 2017 Round 26	DRB Tadjenanet	1 – 0	JS Kabylie	Tadjenanet
16:00	Terbah 61'	Report; Live TV: None		Stadium: Lahoua Smaïl Stadium; Referee: Mohamed Saïdi

20 May 2017 Round 27	CA Batna	0 – 2	DRB Tadjenanet	Batna
16:00		Report; Live TV: None	75' Noubli; 90+5' Demane	Stadium: Mustapha Seffouhi Stadium; Attendance: 0 (close doors); Referee: Lyés Boukouassa

7 June 2017 Round 28	DRB Tadjenanet	2 – 0	NA Hussein Dey	Tadjenanet
17:00	El Moudene 58' (pen.); Demane 62'	Report; Live TV: None		Stadium: Lahoua Smaïl Stadium; Referee: Mustapha Bessiri

10 June 2017 Round 29	MC Oran	2 – 2	DRB Tadjenanet	Oran
17:00	Souibaâh 8'; Bentiba 29'	Report; Live TV: None	55' Noubli; 62' Aib	Stadium: Ahmed Zabana Stadium; Referee: Hamza Bouslimani

14 June 2017 Round 30	DRB Tadjenanet	1 – 0	ES Sétif	Tadjenanet
17:00	Noubli 43'	Report; Live TV: None		Stadium: Lahoua Smaïl Stadium; Referee: Merzoug Brahimi

=== Algerian Cup ===
Win Draw Loss

24 November 2016 Round of 64	CA Bordj Bou Arréridj	1–0	DRB Tadjenanet	Bordj Bou Arréridj
17:00	Daouadi 40' (pen.)	Report; Live TV: Canal Algérie		Stadium: August 20, 1955 Stadium; Referee: Saïdi, Mesbah, Oudene

== Squad information ==
=== Playing statistics ===
No.	Pos	Nat	Player	Total		Ligue 1		Algerian Cup	
No.	Pos	Nat	Player	Apps	Goals	Apps	Goals	Apps	Goals
Goalkeepers
16	GK	(Algeria) ALG	Oussama Benbout	1	0	1	0	0	0
30	GK	(Algeria) ALG	Oussama Litim	22	0	21	0	1	0
1	GK	(Algeria) ALG	Jonathan Matijas	8	0	8	0	0	0
Defenders
28	DF	(Algeria) ALG	Achref Aïb	28	3	27	3	1	0
19	DF	(Algeria) ALG	Ishak Bouda	12	0	12	0	0	0
6	DF	(Algeria) ALG	Senoussi Fourloul	27	0	26	0	1	0
2	DF	(Algeria) ALG	Ali Guitoune	28	0	27	0	1	0
14	DF	(Algeria) ALG	Djilali Terbah	19	2	18	2	1	0
Midfielders
27	MF	(Algeria) ALG	Rachid Mouaden	31	3	30	3	1	0
8	MF	(Algeria) ALG	Hakim Goumidi	10	0	9	0	1	0
25	MF	(Algeria) ALG	Toufik Guerabis	14	1	14	1	0	0
13	MF	(Algeria) ALG	Foued Hadded	25	0	25	0	0	0
29	MF	(Algeria) ALG	Salim Mahsas	2	0	2	0	0	0
21	MF	(Algeria) ALG	Tayeb Maroci	26	0	25	0	1	0
26	MF	(Algeria) ALG	Abdelmalek Meftahi	9	1	9	1	0	0
18	MF	(Algeria) ALG	Abdelhalim Nezouani	23	3	22	3	1	0
17	MF	(Algeria) ALG	Ibrahim Si Ammar	20	0	20	0	0	0
Forwards
10	FW	(Algeria) ALG	Youcef Chibane	24	7	23	7	1	0
20	FW	(Algeria) ALG	Hamza Demane	21	3	20	3	1	0
24	FW	(Algeria) ALG	Abdelouahab Djahel	19	4	19	4	0	0
23	FW	(Algeria) ALG	Fethi Noubli	14	3	14	3	0	0
Players transferred out during the season
5	DF	(Algeria) ALG	Arslane Mazari	10	0	9	0	1	0
11	MF	(Algeria) ALG	Djamel Chettal	13	2	12	2	1	0
7	DF	(Algeria) ALG	Mohamed Billel Benaldjia	4	0	4	0	0	0
22	DF	(Algeria) ALG	Sofiane Boutebba	12	0	12	0	0	0
9	FW	(Algeria) ALG	Farès Cheniguer	7	0	7	0	0	0

Source: Competitions

== Squad list ==
As of January 15, 2017:

Note: Flags indicate national team as defined under FIFA eligibility rules; some limited exceptions apply. Players may hold more than one non-FIFA nationality.

No.	Pos.	Nation	Player
1	GK	ALG	Oussama Benbout
2	DF	ALG	Ali Guitoune (Captain)
6	DF	ALG	Fourloul Senoussi
8	DF	ALG	Hakim Goumidi
10	FW	ALG	Youcef Chibane
13	MF	ALG	Foued Hadded
14	DF	ALG	Djilali Terbah
16	GK	ALG	Mustpaha Boudebza
17	MF	ALG	Ibrahim Si Ammar
18	FW	ALG	Abdelhalim Nezouani
19	MF	ALG	Ishak Bouda

No.	Pos.	Nation	Player
20	FW	ALG	Hamza Demane
21	MF	ALG	Tayeb Maroci
23	DF	ALG	Fethi Noubli
24	FW	ALG	Abdelouahab Djahel
25	FW	ALG	Toufik Guerabis
26	DF	ALG	Abdelmalek Meftahi
27	MF	ALG	Rachid Mouaden (on loan from Paradou)
28	MF	ALG	Achref Aïb
29	DF	ALG	Salim Mahsas
30	GK	ALG	Oussama Litim

== Transfers ==
=== In ===
==== Summer ====
No.	Pos.	Nation	Player
—	DF	ALG	Arslane Mazari (from (Algeria) USM Alger)
—	MF	ALG	Djamel Chettal (from (Algeria) USM Alger)
—	MF	ALG	Ibrahim Si Ammar (from (Algeria) MC El Eulma)
—	GK	ALG	Oussama Litim (from (Algeria) USM Blida)
—	MF	ALG	Tayeb Maroci (from (Algeria) USM Blida)
—	GK	ALG	Jonathan Matijas (from (Algeria) MC Alger)

No.	Pos.	Nation	Player
—	DF	ALG	Mohamed Billel Benaldjia (from (Algeria) USM El Harrach)
—	DF	ALG	Djilali Terbah (from (Algeria) JS Saoura)
—	FW	ALG	Abdelouahab Djahel (from (Algeria) AS Khroub)
—	FW	ALG	Farès Cheniguer (from (Algeria) JSM Skikda)
—	DF	ALG	Ishak Bouda (from (Algeria) RC Relizane)
—	DF	ALG	Fourloul Senoussi (from (Algeria) MC Saïda)

=== Out ===
==== Summer ====
No.	Pos.	Nation	Player
10	MF	ALG	Amir Sayoud (to (Algeria) USM Alger)
—	MF	CMR	Azongha Tembeng Abenego (loan return to (Algeria) MC El Eulma)
—	FW	CGO	Lorry Nkolo (Unattached)
—	MF	ALG	Farid Daoud (to (Algeria) CA Batna)
—	FW	ALG	Abdellah Daouadji (loan return to (Algeria) Paradou AC)

No.	Pos.	Nation	Player
—	DF	ALG	Antara Khedidja (retired)
—	MF	ALG	Abdelmalik Hadef (to (Algeria) JSM Bejaia)
—	DF	ALG	Mohamed Amrane (to (Algeria) CA Batna)
—	GK	ALG	Khairi Barki (to (Algeria) ES Sétif)

==== Winter ====
No.	Pos.	Nation	Player
—	DF	ALG	Arslane Mazari (to (Algeria) CS Constantine)
—	MF	ALG	Djamel Chettal (to (Algeria) USM Bel-Abbès)
—	DF	ALG	Mohamed Billel Benaldjia (to (Algeria) USM Bel-Abbès)

No.	Pos.	Nation	Player
—	DF	ALG	Sofiane Boutebba (to (Algeria) ES Sétif)
—	FW	ALG	Farès Cheniguer (to (Algeria) JSM Skikda)
