= 2018–19 CA Bordj Bou Arreridj season =

Algerian football club season

CA Bordj Bou Arreridj
2018–19 2 season
- Chairman: Anis Benhamadi
- Head coach: Josep María Nogués (from 20 June 2018) (until 4 November 2018); Billel Dziri (from 6 November 2018)
- Stadium: Stade 20 Août 1955
- Ligue 1: 9th
- Algerian Cup: Round of 32
- Top goalscorer: League: Abdelmalek Meftahi (3); Benamar Mellel (3); All: Abdelmalek Meftahi (4)

In the 2018–19 season, CA Bordj Bou Arreridj competed in the Ligue 1 for the 14th season, as well as the Algerian Cup.

== Mid-season ==
=== Overview ===
Competition	Record								Started round	Final position / round	First match	Last match
Competition	G	W	D	L	GF	GA	GD	Win %	Started round	Final position / round	First match	Last match
Ligue 1	30	9	10	11	22	24	−2	30.00	—N/a	9th	11 August 2018	26 May 2019
Algerian Cup	2	1	1	0	1	0	+1	50.00	Round of 64	Round of 32	18 December 2018	28 December 2018
Total	32	10	11	11	23	24	−1	31.25				

Updated to match played 28 May 2018
Source: Competitions

== League table ==
Pos	Team	Pld	W	D	L	GF	GA	GD	Pts	Qualification or relegation
7	CS Constantine	30	10	10	10	30	24	+6	40	Qualification for Arab Club Champions Cup
8	CR Belouizdad	30	10	11	9	28	27	+1	38 (Note: CR Belouizdad were deducted 3 points.)	Qualification for Confederation Cup (Note: CR Belouizdad are Algerian Cup winners.)
9	CA Bordj Bou Arreridj	30	9	10	11	22	24	−2	37	
10	MC Oran	30	8	12	10	33	38	−5	36 (Note: Head-to-head: MC Oran 7 points; NA Hussein Dey 5 points; AS Aïn M'lila 3 points.)	
11	NA Hussein Dey	30	9	9	12	22	29	−7	36	

Source: DZFoot
Rules for classification: 1) points; 2) head-to-head points; 3) head-to-head goal difference; 4) goal difference; 5) total goals; 6) fairplay ranking; 7) playoff.

=== Results summary ===
Overall								Home						Away					
Pld	W	D	L	GF	GA	GD	Pts	W	D	L	GF	GA	GD	W	D	L	GF	GA	GD
27	8	10	9	21	21	0	34	7	5	2	16	7	+9	1	5	7	5	14	−9

Last updated: 28 May 2018.
Source: Competitive matches

=== Results by round ===
Round	1	2	3	4	5	6	7	8	9	10	11	12	13	14	15	16	17	18	19	20	21	22	23	24	25	26	27	28	29	30
Ground	A	H	A	H	A	A	H	A	H	A	H	A	H	A	H	H	A	H	A	H	H	A	H	A	H	A	H	A	H	A
Result	D	D	L	D	L	W	D	D	W	L	D	D	L	L	W	W	L	D	L	W	W	D	W	L	W	D	D	L	W	L
Position	8	11	12	12	14	12	14	14	9	11	13	12	13	13	13	10	12	11	12	10	9	9	9	9	9	10	10	10	8	9

Updated to match(es) played on 28 May 2018. Source: Competitive matches
A = Away; H = Home; W = Win; D = Draw; L = Loss

=== Matches ===
Win Draw Loss

11 August 2018 Round 1	MC Oran	1–1	CA Bordj Bou Arreridj	Oran
21:00	Nadji 59' (pen.)	Soccerway report	Meftahi 1'	Stadium: Ahmed Zabana Stadium; Referee: Abderrezzak Arab

17 August 2018 Round 2	CA Bordj Bou Arreridj	0–0	CS Constantine	Bordj Bou Arréridj
21:00		Soccerway report		Stadium: Stade 20 Août 1955; Referee: Mustapha Ghorbal

1 September 2018 Round 4	CA Bordj Bou Arreridj	0–0	NA Hussein Dey	Bordj Bou Arréridj
20:00		Soccerway report		Stadium: Stade 20 Août 1955; Referee: Mohamed Saïdi

4 September 2018 Round 3	USM Alger	3–1	CA Bordj Bou Arreridj	Bologhine
20:45	Bouderbal 8'; Meftah 33'; Ibara 52'	Soccerway report	Meftahi 9'	Stadium: Omar Hamadi Stadium; Referee: Nabil Boukhalfa

11 September 2018 Round 5	DRB Tadjenanet	3–1	CA Bordj Bou Arreridj	Tadjenanet
17:00	Bensaha 24' (pen.); Aribi 32', 90+3' (pen.)	Soccerway report	Amrane 25'	Stadium: Lahoua Smaïl Stadium; Referee: Lyés Bekouassa

15 September 2018 Round 6	JS Saoura	0–1	CA Bordj Bou Arreridj	Béchar
20:00		Soccerway report	El Moudene 90+4'	Stadium: Stade 20 Août 1955; Referee: Merzoug Brahimi

21 September 2018 Round 7	CA Bordj Bou Arreridj	1–1	MO Béjaïa	Bordj Bou Arréridj
17:45	Meftahi 2'	Soccerway report	Amokrane 7'	Stadium: Stade 20 Août 1955; Referee: Hamza Bouslimani

29 September 2018 Round 8	USM Bel Abbès	0–0	CA Bordj Bou Arreridj	Sidi Bel Abbès
17:45		Soccerway report		Stadium: Stade 24 Fevrier 1956; Referee: Amine Hansal

5 October 2018 Round 9	CA Bordj Bou Arreridj	2–0	AS Ain M'lila	Bordj Bou Arréridj
17:45	Diarra 87'; Mellel 89'	Soccerway report		Stadium: Stade 20 Août 1955; Referee: Ahmed Bouzrar

20 October 2018 Round 11	CA Bordj Bou Arreridj	0–1	MC Alger	Bordj Bou Arréridj
17:45		Soccerway report	Azzi 71'	Stadium: Stade 20 Août 1955; Referee: Lahlou Benbraham

30 October 2018 Round 12	CR Belouizdad	1–1	CA Bordj Bou Arreridj	Belouizdad
15:00	Bechou 80'	Soccerway report	Mellel 79' (pen.)	Stadium: Stade 20 Août 1955; Attendance: 0 (close doors); Referee: Abderrezzak Arab

5 November 2018 Round 13	CA Bordj Bou Arreridj	1–2	ES Sétif	Bordj Bou Arréridj
16:00	Athmani 41'	Soccerway report	Djahnit 74' (pen.); Lakroum 88'	Stadium: Stade 20 Août 1955; Attendance: 0 (close doors); Referee: Lyés Bekouassa

9 November 2018 Round 14	Olympique de Médéa	1–0	CA Bordj Bou Arreridj	Médéa
15:00	Addadi 53'	Soccerway report		Stadium: Stade Imam Lyes de Médéa; Referee: Farouk Mial

16 November 2018 Round 10	Paradou AC	2–0	CA Bordj Bou Arreridj	Bologhine
16:00	Benayad 24'; Naidji 43'	Soccerway report		Stadium: Omar Hamadi Stadium; Referee: Mohamed Saïdi

23 November 2018 Round 15	CA Bordj Bou Arreridj	1–0	JS Kabylie	Bordj Bou Arréridj
16:00	Mellel 8' (pen.)	Soccerway report		Stadium: Stade 20 Août 1955; Attendance: 0 (close doors); Referee: Mustapha Bessiri

4 January 2019 Round 16	CA Bordj Bou Arreridj	3–1	MC Oran	Magra (Note: CA Bordj Bou Arreridj played their home match against MC Oran at Boucheligue Brothers Stadium, Magra, instead of their regular stadium Stade 20 Août 1955, Bordj Bou Arréridj.)
15:00	Ziad 22'; Zerara 72' (pen.); Droueche 89'	Soccerway report	Chibane 42'	Stadium: Boucheligue Brothers Stadium; Attendance: 0 (close doors); Referee: Lotfi Bekouassa

15 January 2019 Round 17	CS Constantine	1–0	CA Bordj Bou Arreridj	Constantine
17:45	Bencherifa 58'	Soccerway report		Stadium: Stade Mohamed Hamlaoui; Referee: Ahmed Bouzrar

18 January 2019 Round 18	CA Bordj Bou Arreridj	1–1	USM Alger	Magra (Note: CA Bordj Bou Arreridj played their home match against USM Alger at Boucheligue Brothers Stadium, Magra, instead of their regular stadium Stade 20 Août 1955, Bordj Bou Arréridj.)
15:00	Ziad 4'	Soccerway report	Ellafi 75'	Stadium: Boucheligue Brothers Stadium; Attendance: 0 (close doors); Referee: Mohamed Saïdi

27 January 2019 Round 19	NA Hussein Dey	1–0	CA Bordj Bou Arreridj	Belouizdad
15:00	Yaya 49'	Soccerway report		Stadium: Stade 20 Août 1955; Referee: Merzoug Brahimi

5 February 2019 Round 20	CA Bordj Bou Arreridj	1–0	DRB Tadjenanet	Bordj Bou Arréridj
17:00	Bidimbou 14'	Soccerway report		Stadium: Stade 20 Août 1955; Referee: Mustapha Bessiri

12 February 2019 Round 22	MO Béjaïa	0–0	CA Bordj Bou Arreridj	Béjaïa
17:00		Soccerway report		Stadium: Stade de l'Unité Maghrébine; Referee: Missoum Benabdellah

22 February 2019 Round 21	CA Bordj Bou Arreridj	2–0	JS Saoura	Bordj Bou Arréridj
18:00	Djahnit 35', 36'	Soccerway report		Stadium: Stade 20 Août 1955; Referee: Ali Nader

2 March 2019 Round 23	CA Bordj Bou Arreridj	3–1	USM Bel Abbès	Bordj Bou Arréridj
18:00	Sebie 29'; Aggoun 35'; Athmani 47'	Soccerway report	Seguer 38'	Stadium: Stade 20 Août 1955; Referee: Merzoug Brahimi

17 March 2019 Round 24	AS Ain M'lila	1–0	CA Bordj Bou Arreridj	Aïn M'lila
15:00	Si Ammar 5'	Soccerway report		Stadium: Stade Khelifi Touhami Zoubir; Referee: Mustapha Bessiri

4 April 2019 Round 25	CA Bordj Bou Arreridj	1–0	Paradou AC	Bordj Bou Arréridj
18:00	Amrane 59'	Soccerway report		Stadium: Stade 20 Août 1955; Referee: Ahmed Bouzrar

21 April 2019 Round 26	MC Alger	0–0	CA Bordj Bou Arreridj	Algiers
16:00		Soccerway report		Stadium: July 5, 1962 Stadium; Referee: Lahlou Benbraham

11 May 2019 Round 27	CA Bordj Bou Arreridj	0–0	CR Belouizdad	Bordj Bou Arréridj
22:30		Soccerway report		Stadium: Stade 20 Août 1955; Referee: Mustapha Bessiri

16 May 2019 Round 28	ES Sétif	1–0	CA Bordj Bou Arreridj	Sétif
22:30	Deghmoum 83'	Soccerway report		Stadium: Stade 8 Mai 1945; Referee: Missoum Benabdellah

21 May 2019 Round 29	CA Bordj Bou Arreridj	1–0	Olympique de Médéa	Bordj Bou Arréridj
22:30	Athmani 36'	Soccerway report		Stadium: Stade 20 Août 1955; Referee: Ali Nader

26 May 2019 Round 30	JS Kabylie	2–0	CA Bordj Bou Arreridj	Tizi Ouzou
22:30	Hamroune 38' (pen.); Belgherbi 54'	Soccerway report		Stadium: November 1, 1954 Stadium; Referee: Rafik Achouri

== Algerian Cup ==
18 December 2018 Round of 64	GC Mascara	0–1	CA Bordj Bou Arréridj	Mascara
15:00			90' Meftahi	Stadium: Stade de l'Unité Africaine; Referee: Hamza Bouslimani

28 December 2018 Round of 32	CA Bordj Bou Arréridj	0–0 (a.e.t.) (6–5 p)	WA Tlemcen	Bordj Bou Arréridj
16:00				Stadium: 20 August 1955 Stadium; Referee: Farouk Mial

21 January 2019 Round of 16	USM Annaba	3–1	CA Bordj Bou Arréridj	Annaba
16:00	Elghomari 9', 24'; Ammour 71'		Droueche 52'	Stadium: May 19, 1956 Stadium; Referee: Lyés Bekouassa

== Squad information ==
=== Playing statistics ===
No.	Pos	Nat	Player	Total		Ligue 1		Algerian Cup	
No.	Pos	Nat	Player	Apps	Goals	Apps	Goals	Apps	Goals
Goalkeepers
1	GK	(Algeria) ALG	Faouzi Chaouchi	28	0	25	0	3	0
16	GK	(Algeria) ALG	Mohamed Réda Younes	5	0	5	0	0	0
Defenders
13	DF	(Algeria) ALG	Farès Aggoun	31	1	28	1	3	0
26	DF	(Algeria) ALG	Amine Aissa El Bey	4	0	4	0	0	0
17	DF	(Algeria) ALG	Mohamed Amrane	29	2	26	2	3	0
4	DF	(Algeria) ALG	Khaled Bouhakake	22	1	20	1	2	0
14	DF	(Senegal) SEN	Isla Daoudi Diomandé	16	0	15	0	1	0
3	DF	(Algeria) ALG	Ali Guitoune	4	0	4	0	0	0
20	DF	(Algeria) ALG	Fayçal Kherifi	10	0	9	0	1	0
28	DF	(Algeria) ALG	Touhami Sebie	20	1	19	1	1	0
15	DF	(Algeria) ALG	Mohamed Khoutir Ziti	25	0	22	0	3	0
Midfielders
11	MF	(Algeria) ALG	Walid Athmani	32	2	29	2	3	0
5	MF	(Algeria) ALG	Islam Mohamed Bouflih	3	0	3	0	0	0
7	MF	(Algeria) ALG	Mehdi Droueche	31	1	28	1	3	0
23	MF	(Algeria) ALG	Messaoud Gherbi	27	0	24	0	3	0
19	MF	(Algeria) ALG	Abdelmalek Meftahi	23	4	20	3	3	1
21	MF	(Algeria) ALG	Nour El Islam Melikchi	5	0	4	0	1	0
21	MF	(Algeria) ALG	Zahir Nemdil	7	0	7	0	0	0
24	MF	(Algeria) ALG	Toufik Zerara	30	1	27	1	3	0
6	MF	(Algeria) ALG	Hamza Ziad	25	2	22	2	3	0
Forwards
11	FW	(Republic of the Congo) CGO	Kader Bidimbou	7	1	6	1	1	0
8	FW	(Algeria) ALG	Bassam Chaouti	13	0	11	0	2	0
9	FW	(Algeria) ALG	Youcef Djahnit	15	2	14	2	1	0
	FW	(Algeria) ALG	Sofiane Fouad Lachahab	5	0	5	0	0	0
	FW	(Algeria) ALG	Noufel Lalaoui	1	0	1	0	0	0
29	FW	(Algeria) ALG	Benamar Mellel	16	3	14	3	2	0
Players transferred out during the season
14	FW	(Mali) MLI	Ismaïla Diarra	12	1	12	1	0	0
	MF	(Algeria) ALG	Abdellah El Moudene	13	1	12	1	1	0

Last updated: 11 June 2018
Source: fr.soccerway.com

== Squad list ==
As of August 11, 2018. Note: Flags indicate national team as defined under FIFA eligibility rules; some limited exceptions apply. Players may hold more than one non-FIFA nationality.

No.	Pos.	Nation	Player
1	GK	ALG	Faouzi Chaouchi
2	DF	ALG	Zineddine Tabbi
3	DF	ALG	Ali Guitoune
4	DF	ALG	Khaled Bouhakake
5	MF	ALG	Islam Mohamed Bouflih
6	MF	ALG	Hamza Ziad
7	FW	ALG	Mehdi Droueche
8	MF	ALG	Bassam Chaouti
9	FW	ALG	Youcef Djahnit
10	MF	ALG	Mohamed Yacine Athmani
11	FW	ALG	Walid Athmani
13	DF	ALG	Farès Aggoun
14	FW	MLI	Ismaïla Diarra
15	DF	ALG	Mohamed Khoutir Ziti

No.	Pos.	Nation	Player
16	GK	ALG	Mohamed Réda Younes
17	DF	ALG	Mohamed Amrane
19	FW	ALG	Abdelmalek Meftahi
20	DF	ALG	Fayçal Kherifi
21	FW	ALG	Zahir Nemdil
22	MF	ALG	Hacham Meftahi
23	MF	ALG	Messaoud Gherbi
24	MF	ALG	Toufik Zerara
26	DF	ALG	Mohamed Ramzi Amraoui
27	FW	ALG	Abdellah El Moudenel
28	DF	ALG	Touhami Sebie
29	DF	ALG	Benamar Mellel
30	GK	ALG	Abdelkrim Maiza

== Transfers ==
=== In ===
Date	Pos	Player	From club	Transfer fee	Source
24 June 2018	DF	(Algeria) Ali Guitoune	JS Kabylie	Free transfer	
24 June 2018	MF	(Algeria) Abdelmalek Meftahi	WA Boufarik	Free transfer	
24 June 2018	DF	(Algeria) Mellel Benamar	USM El Harrach	Free transfer	
25 June 2018	MF	(Algeria) Mehdi Droueche	Paradou AC	Free transfer	
2 July 2018	DF	(Algeria) Mohamed Khoutir Ziti	ES Sétif	Free transfer	
4 July 2018	MF	(Algeria) Toufik Zerara	CS Constantine	Free transfer	
5 July 2018	DF	(Algeria) Faycal Kherifi	US Biskra	Free transfer	
7 July 2018	GK	(Algeria) Faouzi Chaouchi	CR Belouizdad	Free transfer	
2 August 2018	FW	(Mali) Ismaila Diarra	(Rwanda) Rayon Sports	Free transfer	
18 December 2018	MF	(Ivory Coast) Isla Daoudi Diomandé	ES Sétif	Free transfer	
25 December 2018	FW	(Republic of the Congo) Kader Bidimbou	(Republic of the Congo) Diables Noirs	Free transfer	

=== Out ===
Date	Pos	Player	To club	Transfer fee	Source
28 June 2018	MF	(Algeria) Djamel Rabti	CR Belouizdad	Free transfer	
