= 2018–19 DRB Tadjenanet season =

DRB Tadjenanet
2018–19 season
- Chairman: Tahar Garaich
- Head coach: Hammadi Daou (until 1 September 2018)
- Stadium: Lahoua Smaïl Stadium, Tadjenanet
- Ligue 1: 15th
- Algerian Cup: Round of 64
- Top goalscorer: League: Karim Aribi (10); All: Karim Aribi (10)

In the 2018–19 season, DRB Tadjenanet is competing in Ligue 1 for the 4th season, as well as for the Algerian Cup.

== Mid-season ==
=== Overview ===
| Competition | Record | | | | | | | | Started round | Final position / round | First match | Last match |
| Competition | G | W | D | L | GF | GA | GD | Win % | Started round | Final position / round | First match | Last match |
|---|---|---|---|---|---|---|---|---|---|---|---|---|
| Ligue 1 | 30 | 7 | 10 | 13 | 26 | 38 | −12 | 23.33 | —N/a | 15th | 11 August 2018 | 26 May 2019 |
| Algerian Cup | 1 | 0 | 0 | 1 | 0 | 2 | −2 | 0.00 | Round of 64 | | 27 December 2018 | |
| Total | 31 | 7 | 10 | 14 | 26 | 40 | −14 | 22.58 | | | | |

Updated to match played 28 May 2018
Source: Competitions

== League table ==
| Pos | Team | Pld | W | D | L | GF | GA | GD | Pts | Qualification or relegation |
|---|---|---|---|---|---|---|---|---|---|---|
| 12 | AS Aïn M'lila | 30 | 7 | 15 | 8 | 20 | 30 | −10 | 36 (Note: Head-to-head: MC Oran 7 points; NA Hussein Dey 5 points; AS Aïn M'lila 3 points.) | |
| 13 | USM Bel Abbès | 30 | 9 | 8 | 13 | 24 | 39 | −15 | 35 | |
| 14 | MO Béjaïa (R) | 30 | 7 | 12 | 11 | 23 | 36 | −13 | 33 | Relegation to Ligue 2 |
| 15 | DRB Tadjenanet (R) | 30 | 7 | 10 | 13 | 26 | 38 | −12 | 31 (Note: Head-to-head: DRB Tadjenanet 4 points; Olympique de Médéa 1 point.) | Relegation to Ligue 2 |
| 16 | Olympique de Médéa (R) | 30 | 7 | 10 | 13 | 21 | 31 | −10 | 31 | Relegation to Ligue 2 |

Source: DZFoot
Rules for classification: 1) points; 2) head-to-head points; 3) head-to-head goal difference; 4) goal difference; 5) total goals; 6) fairplay ranking; 7) playoff.
(R) Relegated

=== Results summary ===
| Overall | | | | | | | | Home | | | | | | Away | | | | | |
| Pld | W | D | L | GF | GA | GD | Pts | W | D | L | GF | GA | GD | W | D | L | GF | GA | GD |
|---|---|---|---|---|---|---|---|---|---|---|---|---|---|---|---|---|---|---|---|
| 0 | 0 | 0 | 0 | 0 | 0 | 0 | 0 | 0 | 0 | 0 | 0 | 0 | 0 | 0 | 0 | 0 | 0 | 0 | 0 |

Last updated: 28 May 2018.
Source: Competitive matches

=== Results by round ===
| Round | 1 | 2 | 3 | 4 | 5 | 6 | 7 | 8 | 9 | 10 | 11 | 12 | 13 | 14 | 15 | 16 | 17 | 18 | 19 | 20 | 21 | 22 | 23 | 24 | 25 | 26 | 27 | 28 | 29 | 30 |
|---|---|---|---|---|---|---|---|---|---|---|---|---|---|---|---|---|---|---|---|---|---|---|---|---|---|---|---|---|---|---|
| Ground | A | H | H | A | H | A | H | A | H | A | H | A | H | A | H | H | A | A | H | A | H | A | H | A | H | A | H | A | H | A |
| Result | L | L | L | L | W | D | W | D | L | L | D | L | D | D | W | W | L | D | D | L | W | L | W | D | W | L | D | L | D | L |
| Position | 14 | 14 | 14 | 16 | 13 | 14 | 13 | 13 | 14 | 14 | 14 | 14 | 14 | 15 | 15 | 15 | 15 | 14 | 13 | 14 | 11 | 14 | 11 | 12 | 11 | 12 | 11 | 15 | 15 | 15 |

Updated to match(es) played on 28 May 2018. Source: Competitive matches
A = Away; H = Home; W = Win; D = Draw; L = Loss

=== Matches ===
Win Draw Loss

| 14 August 2018 Round 1 | USM Alger | 3–1 | DRB Tadjenanet | Bologhine |
| 21:00 | Meziane 48'; Ibara 71'; Benchaâ 83' | Soccerway report | Demane 9' | Stadium: Omar Hamadi Stadium; Referee: Merzoug Brahimi |

| 25 August 2018 Round 2 | DRB Tadjenanet | 0–1 | MC Alger | Tadjenanet |
| 17:00 | | Soccerway report | Nekkache 7' | Stadium: Lahoua Smaïl Stadium; Referee: Mohamed Saïdi |

| 28 August 2018 Round 3 | DRB Tadjenanet | 1–2 | NA Hussein Dey | Tadjenanet |
| 17:00 | Aribi 64' | Soccerway report | Yaiche 47'; Khacef 90' | Stadium: Lahoua Smaïl Stadium; Referee: Redouane Necib |

| 1 September 2018 Round 4 | CR Belouizdad | 2–1 | DRB Tadjenanet | Belouizdad |
| 17:00 | Hérida 30'; Kenniche 75' | Soccerway report | Bensaha 68' | Stadium: Stade 20 Août 1955; Referee: Lahlou Benbraham |

| 11 September 2018 Round 5 | DRB Tadjenanet | 3–1 | CA Bordj Bou Arreridj | Tadjenanet |
| 17:00 | Bensaha 24' (pen.); Aribi 32', 90+3' (pen.) | Soccerway report | Amrane 25' | Stadium: Lahoua Smaïl Stadium; Referee: Lyés Bekouassa |

| 17 September 2018 Round 6 | ES Sétif | 1–1 | DRB Tadjenanet | Sétif |
| 19:00 | Bakir 68' | Soccerway report | Hammouche 74' | Stadium: Stade 8 Mai 1945; Referee: Hamza Bouslimani |

| 22 September 2018 Round 7 | DRB Tadjenanet | 1–0 | JS Saoura | Tadjenanet |
| 16:00 | Aribi 54' (pen.) | Soccerway report | | Stadium: Lahoua Smaïl Stadium; Referee: Lotfi Bekouassa |

| 28 September 2018 Round 8 | Olympique de Médéa | 1–1 | DRB Tadjenanet | Médéa |
| 16:00 | Motrani 40' | Soccerway report | Bensaha 45+3' | Stadium: Stade Imam Lyes de Médéa; Referee: Merzoug Brahimi |

| 5 October 2018 Round 9 | DRB Tadjenanet | 1–2 | MO Béjaïa | Tadjenanet |
| 16:00 | Aribi 45' (pen.) | Soccerway report | Dahar 49' (pen.); Amokrane 55' | Stadium: Lahoua Smaïl Stadium; Referee: Mustapha Ghorbal |

| 9 October 2018 Round 10 | JS Kabylie | 3–2 | DRB Tadjenanet | Tizi Ouzou |
| 17:45 | Tafni 10', 37'; Hamroune 85' | Soccerway report | Aribi 16'; Attouche 88' | Stadium: November 1, 1954 Stadium; Referee: Hamza Bouslimani |

| 23 October 2018 Round 11 | DRB Tadjenanet | 0–0 | USM Bel Abbès | Tadjenanet |
| 17:30 | | Soccerway report | | Stadium: Lahoua Smaïl Stadium; Referee: Amine Sekhraoui |

| 30 October 2018 Round 12 | MC Oran | 3–1 | DRB Tadjenanet | Oran |
| 17:00 | Bouchar 50'; Nadji 56'; Chibane 72' | Soccerway report | Aribi 44' | Stadium: Ahmed Zabana Stadium; Referee: Amine Hansal |

| 6 November 2018 Round 13 | DRB Tadjenanet | 0–0 | AS Ain M'lila | Tadjenanet |
| 17:00 | | Soccerway report | | Stadium: Lahoua Smaïl Stadium; Referee: Redouane Necib |

| 10 November 2018 Round 14 | CS Constantine | 3–3 | DRB Tadjenanet | Constantine |
| 17:00 | Abid 8'; Aichi 19'; Chahrour 83' | Soccerway report | Aribi 11', 89'; Bensaha 18' | Stadium: Stade Mohamed Hamlaoui; Referee: Lyés Bekouassa |

| 22 November 2018 Round 15 | DRB Tadjenanet | 1–0 | Paradou AC | Tadjenanet |
| 18:00 | Terbah 70' | Soccerway report | | Stadium: Lahoua Smaïl Stadium; Referee: Mustapha Ghorbal |

| 4 January 2019 Round 16 | DRB Tadjenanet | 1–0 | USM Alger | Tadjenanet |
| 18:00 | Aib 24' | Soccerway report | | Stadium: Lahoua Smaïl Stadium; Referee: Nabil Boukhalfa |

| 11 January 2019 Round 17 | MC Alger | 4–1 | DRB Tadjenanet | Algiers |
| 18:00 | Souibaâh 27', 88'; Haddouche 60'; Bourdim 69' | Soccerway report | Sai | Stadium: July 5, 1962 Stadium; Referee: Lahlou Benbraham |

| 25 January 2019 (Note: The match was originally to be played on 25 January 2019, 17:45, but it was postponed due to heavy snowfall.) Round 19 | DRB Tadjenanet | – | CR Belouizdad | Tadjenanet |
| 17:45 | | Soccerway report | | Stadium: Lahoua Smaïl Stadium; Referee: Redouane Necib |

| 31 January 2019 Round 18 | NA Hussein Dey | 0–0 | DRB Tadjenanet | Belouizdad |
| 15:00 | | Soccerway report | | Stadium: Stade 20 Août 1955; Referee: Ahmed Bouzrar |

| 5 February 2019 Round 20 | CA Bordj Bou Arreridj | 1–0 | DRB Tadjenanet | Bordj Bou Arréridj |
| 17:00 | Bidimbou 14' | Soccerway report | | Stadium: Stade 20 Août 1955; Referee: Mustapha Bessiri |

| 9 February 2019 Round 21 | DRB Tadjenanet | 2–0 | ES Sétif | Tadjenanet |
| 17:45 | Bensaha 26'; Ounnas 30' | Soccerway report | | Stadium: Lahoua Smaïl Stadium; Referee: Lyés Bekouassa |

| 13 February 2019 Round 22 | JS Saoura | 2–0 | DRB Tadjenanet | Béchar |
| 18:00 | Ulimwengu 82'; Boukbouka 90+2' | Soccerway report | | Stadium: Stade 20 Août 1955; Referee: Amine Sekhraoui |

| 2 March 2019 Round 23 | DRB Tadjenanet | 1–0 | Olympique de Médéa | Tadjenanet |
| 18:00 | Bensaha 36' | Soccerway report | | Stadium: Lahoua Smaïl Stadium; Referee: Lotfi Bekouassa |

| 14 March 2019 Round 24 | MO Béjaïa | 2–2 | DRB Tadjenanet | Béjaïa |
| 17:00 | Bessan 7'; Touré 35' | Soccerway report | Bensaha 11'; Dellahi 73' | Stadium: Stade de l'Unité Maghrébine; Attendance: 0 (close doors); Referee: Nabil Boukhalfa |

| 1 April 2019 Round 25 | DRB Tadjenanet | 2–1 | JS Kabylie | Tadjenanet |
| 18:00 | Taib 27'; Bensaha 72' (pen.) | Soccerway report | Hamroune 76' | Stadium: Lahoua Smaïl Stadium; Referee: Mohamed Saïdi |

| 9 April 2019 Round 19 | DRB Tadjenanet | 0–0 | CR Belouizdad | Tadjenanet |
| 18:00 | | Soccerway report | | Stadium: Lahoua Smaïl Stadium; Referee: Said Aouina |

| 21 April 2019 Round 26 | USM Bel Abbès | 1–0 | DRB Tadjenanet | Sidi Bel Abbès |
| 16:00 | Seguer 19' | Soccerway report | | Stadium: Stade 24 Fevrier 1956; Referee: Lyés Bekouassa |

| 11 May 2019 Round 27 | DRB Tadjenanet | 0–0 | MC Oran | Tadjenanet |
| 22:30 | | Soccerway report | | Stadium: Lahoua Smaïl Stadium; Referee: Lotfi Bekouassa |

| 16 May 2019 Round 28 | AS Ain M'lila | 2–0 | DRB Tadjenanet | Aïn M'lila |
| 16:00 | Mahious 45+2' (pen.); Tiaïba 57' | Soccerway report | | Stadium: Stade Khelifi Touhami Zoubir; Referee: Hamza Bouslimani |

| 21 May 2019 Round 29 | DRB Tadjenanet | 0–0 | CS Constantine | Tadjenanet |
| 22:30 | | Soccerway report | | Stadium: Lahoua Smaïl Stadium; Attendance: 0 (close doors); Referee: Missoum Benabdellah |

| 26 May 2019 Round 30 | Paradou AC | 3–0 | DRB Tadjenanet | Bologhine |
| 22:30 | Benayad 16', 65'; Naidji 18' | Soccerway report | | Stadium: Omar Hamadi Stadium; Referee: Mustapha Bessiri |

== Algerian Cup ==
| 18 December 2018 Round of 64 | DRB Tadjenanet | 0–2 | CR Belouizdad | Tadjenanet |
| 17:00 | | | 28' Balegh; 53' Bechou | Stadium: Lahoua Smaïl Stadium; Referee: Mohamed Saïdi |

== Squad information ==
=== Playing statistics ===
| No. | Pos | Nat | Player | Total | | Ligue 1 | | Algerian Cup | |
| No. | Pos | Nat | Player | Apps | Goals | Apps | Goals | Apps | Goals |
Goalkeepers
| 30 | GK | (Algeria) ALG | Fares Belkerrouche | 10 | 0 | 10 | 0 | 0 | 0 |
| 16 | GK | (Algeria) ALG | Mustapha Boudebza | 1 | 0 | 1 | 0 | 0 | 0 |
| 1 | GK | (Algeria) ALG | Mohamed Seddik Mokrani | 22 | 0 | 21 | 0 | 1 | 0 |
Defenders
| 28 | DF | (Algeria) ALG | Achref Aïb | 30 | 1 | 29 | 1 | 1 | 0 |
| 4 | DF | (Algeria) ALG | Sofiane Boutebba | 10 | 0 | 9 | 0 | 1 | 0 |
| | DF | (Algeria) ALG | Sid Ahmed Chaibeddour | 7 | 0 | 7 | 0 | 0 | 0 |
| 23 | DF | (Algeria) ALG | Amar Djabou | 19 | 0 | 18 | 0 | 1 | 0 |
| 6 | DF | (Algeria) ALG | Senoussi Fourloul | 24 | 0 | 24 | 0 | 0 | 0 |
| 26 | DF | (Algeria) ALG | Tawfiq Ghomrani | 1 | 0 | 1 | 0 | 0 | 0 |
| 15 | DF | (Algeria) ALG | Abdelhafid Hoggas | 14 | 0 | 14 | 0 | 0 | 0 |
| 12 | DF | (Algeria) ALG | Oussama Meddahi | 27 | 0 | 26 | 0 | 1 | 0 |
| 14 | DF | (Algeria) ALG | Djilali Terbah | 15 | 1 | 15 | 1 | 0 | 0 |
Midfielders
| 29 | MF | (Algeria) ALG | Oussama Aggar | 9 | 0 | 8 | 0 | 1 | 0 |
| 22 | MF | (Algeria) ALG | Mohamed Ali Chihati | 7 | 0 | 7 | 0 | 0 | 0 |
| | MF | (Mauritania) MTN | Mohamed Dellahi Yali | 12 | 1 | 12 | 1 | 0 | 0 |
| 5 | MF | (Algeria) ALG | Adem Izghouti | 16 | 0 | 15 | 0 | 1 | 0 |
| 21 | MF | (Algeria) ALG | Tayeb Maroci | 17 | 0 | 16 | 0 | 1 | 0 |
| | MF | (Algeria) ALG | Rabah Merah | 2 | 0 | 2 | 0 | 0 | 0 |
| | MF | (Algeria) ALG | Hamza Ounnas | 25 | 2 | 24 | 2 | 1 | 0 |
| 11 | MF | (Algeria) ALG | Mohamed Taib | 27 | 1 | 26 | 1 | 1 | 0 |
Forwards
| 8 | FW | (Algeria) ALG | Abdelaziz Ammachi | 22 | 0 | 21 | 0 | 1 | 0 |
| 9 | FW | (Algeria) ALG | Mohamed Hichem Attouche | 15 | 1 | 15 | 1 | 0 | 0 |
| 7 | FW | (Algeria) ALG | Billel Bensaha | 28 | 7 | 28 | 7 | 0 | 0 |
| | FW | (Algeria) ALG | Anis Boutouili | 1 | 0 | 1 | 0 | 0 | 0 |
| | FW | (Algeria) ALG | Mohamed Chergui | 4 | 0 | 4 | 0 | 0 | 0 |
| 20 | FW | (Algeria) ALG | Hamza Demane | 23 | 1 | 22 | 1 | 1 | 0 |
| | FW | (Algeria) ALG | Anouar Sai | 2 | 1 | 2 | 1 | 0 | 0 |
| | FW | (Mauritania) MTN | Mohamed Abdellahi Soudani | 2 | 0 | 2 | 0 | 0 | 0 |
Players transferred out during the season
| 13 | FW | (Algeria) ALG | Karim Aribi | 15 | 10 | 14 | 10 | 1 | 0 |
| 27 | FW | (Algeria) ALG | Hichem Mokhtar | 7 | 0 | 6 | 0 | 1 | 0 |

Last updated: 5 July 2018
Source: fr.soccerway.com

== Squad list ==
As of August 11, 2018. Note: Flags indicate national team as defined under FIFA eligibility rules; some limited exceptions apply. Players may hold more than one non-FIFA nationality.

| No. | Pos. | Nation | Player |
|---|---|---|---|
| 1 | GK | ALG | Mohamed Seddik Mokrani |
| 4 | DF | ALG | Sofiane Boutebba |
| 5 | MF | ALG | Adem Izghouti |
| 6 | DF | ALG | Senoussi Fourloul |
| 7 | FW | ALG | Billel Bensaha |
| 8 | MF | ALG | Abdelaziz Ammachi |
| 9 | FW | ALG | Mohamed Hichem Attouche |
| 11 | MF | ALG | Mohamed Taib |
| 12 | DF | ALG | Oussama Meddahi |
| 13 | MF | ALG | Karim Aribi |
| 14 | DF | ALG | Djilali Terbah |
| 15 | DF | ALG | Abdelhafid Hoggas |

| No. | Pos. | Nation | Player |
|---|---|---|---|
| 16 | GK | ALG | Mustapha Boudebza |
| 17 | DF | ALG | Mohamed Hammouche |
| 20 | FW | ALG | Hamza Demane |
| 21 | MF | ALG | Tayeb Maroci |
| 22 | MF | ALG | Mohamed Ali Chihati |
| 23 | DF | ALG | Amar Djabou |
| 25 | FW | ALG | Toufik Guerabis |
| 26 | DF | ALG | Tawfiq Ghomrani |
| 27 | FW | ALG | Hichem Mokhtari |
| 29 | FW | ALG | Oussama Aggar |
| 28 | MF | ALG | Achref Aïb |
| 30 | GK | ALG | Fares Belkerrouche |

== Transfers ==
=== In ===
| Date | Pos | Player | From club | Transfer fee | Source |
|---|---|---|---|---|---|
| 19 June 2018 | MF | (Algeria) Abdelaziz Amachi | MC Alger | Undisclosed | |
| 5 July 2018 | MF | (Algeria) Mohamed Adem Izghouti | CR Belouizdad | Free transfer | |
| 5 July 2018 | MF | (Algeria) Oussama Aggar | MO Béjaïa | Free transfer | |
| 5 July 2018 | DF | (Algeria) Mohamed Herida | NA Hussein Dey | Free transfer | |
| 10 July 2018 | MF | (Niger) Youssouf Oumarou Alio | (Morocco) MC Oujda | Free transfer | |

=== Out ===
| Date | Pos | Player | To club | Transfer fee | Source |
|---|---|---|---|---|---|
| 12 June 2018 | FW | (Algeria) Mohamed Amine Belmokhtar | CS Constantine | Free transfer | |
| 12 June 2018 | FW | (Mali) Dousse Kodjo | MC Oran | Free transfer | |
| 29 June 2018 | GK | (Algeria) Billel Boufeneche | AS Ain M'lila | Free transfer | |
| 30 June 2018 | DF | (Algeria) Abderrahim Hamra | (Algeria) USM Alger | Loan Return | |
| 30 June 2018 | FW | (Algeria) Kaddour Cherif | (Algeria) USM Alger | Loan Return | |
| 10 August 2018 | MF | (Algeria) Abdellah Daouadji | JSM Béjaïa | Free transfer | |
