= 2015–16 DRB Tadjenanet season =

DRB Tadjenanet
2015–16 season
- Head coach: Liamine Bougherara
- Stadium: Lahoua Smaïl Stadium
- Ligue 1: 7th
- Algerian Cup: Round of 16
- Top goalscorer: League: Youcef Chibane (8); All: Youcef Chibane (10)

In the 2015–16 season, DRB Tadjenanet is competing in the Ligue 1 for the 1st season, as well as the Algerian Cup. They will be competing in Ligue 1, and the Algerian Cup.

== Squad list ==
Players and squad numbers last updated on 15 August 2015.
Note: Flags indicate national team as has been defined under FIFA eligibility rules. Players may hold more than one non-FIFA nationality.

No.	Nat.	Position	Name	Date of Birth (Age)	Signed from
Goalkeepers
1	(Algeria)	GK	Khairi Barki	12 December 1990 (aged 24)	(Algeria) [[]]
16	(Algeria)	GK	Farès Belalem	29 December 1986 (aged 28)	(Algeria) [[]]
30	(Algeria)	GK	Mohamed Madaci	12 October 1992 (aged 22)	(Algeria) [[]]
Defenders
2	(Algeria)	CB	Ali Guitoune	15 February 1987 (aged 28)	(Algeria) [[]]
6	(Algeria)	LB	Antara Khedidja	27 June 1982 (aged 33)	(Algeria) [[]]
8	(Algeria)	CB	Hakim Goumidi	12 April 1991 (aged 24)	(Algeria) [[]]
17	(Algeria)	CB	Mohamed Amrane	27 January 1994 (aged 21)	(Algeria) [[]]
22	(Algeria)	LB	Sofiane Boutebba	17 February 1989 (aged 26)	(Algeria) [[]]
25	(Algeria)	RB	Tawfiq Ghomrani (C.)	4 May 1985 (aged 30)	(Algeria) [[]]
28	(Algeria)	CB	Mohamed Achref Aib	24 May 1990 (aged 25)	(Algeria) [[]]
29	(Algeria)	CB	Abdelghani Khiat	30 January 1989 (aged 26)	(Algeria) [[]]
Midfielders
12	(Cameroon)		Azongha Tembeng	13 September 1991 (aged 23)	(Algeria) [[]]
13	(Algeria)		Foued Hadded	1 November 1990 (aged 24)	(Algeria) [[]]
19	(Ivory Coast)		Brahima Touré	9 September 1989 (aged 25)	(Algeria) [[]]
20	(Algeria)		Walid Chermat	25 March 1990 (aged 25)	(Algeria) [[]]
23	(Algeria)		Oualid Abdenouri	21 January 1991 (aged 24)	(Algeria) [[]]
27	(Algeria)		Abdellah El Moudene	11 February 1994 (aged 21)	(Algeria) [[]]
4	(Algeria)		Zakaria Benhocine	19 May 1986 (aged 29)	(Algeria) [[]]
11	(Algeria)		Amir Sayoud	30 September 1990 (aged 24)	(Algeria) [[]]
Forwards
7	(Algeria)		Abdelmalik Hadef	13 May 1991 (aged 24)	(Algeria) [[]]
9	(Republic of the Congo)		Lorry Nkolo	22 June 1991 (aged 24)	(Algeria) [[]]
10	(Algeria)		Youcef Chibane	23 September 1988 (aged 26)	(Algeria) [[]]
18	(Algeria)		Abdelhalim Nezouani	25 January 1985 (aged 30)	(Algeria) [[]]
21	(Algeria)		Mohamed Lamine Amrani	3 March 1991 (aged 24)	(Algeria) [[]]
24	(Algeria)		Abdelhakim Amokrane	10 May 1994 (aged 21)	(Algeria) [[]]
31	(Algeria)		Abdellah Daouadji	9 July 1995 (aged 20)	(Algeria) [[]]
	(Algeria)		Hamza Demane	23 February 1989 (aged 26)	(Algeria) [[]]
	(Algeria)		Oussama Abdeldjelil	23 June 1993 (aged 22)	(Algeria) [[]]

== Competitions ==
=== Overview ===
Competition	Record								Started round	Final position / round	First match	Last match
Competition	G	W	D	L	GF	GA	GD	Win %	Started round	Final position / round	First match	Last match
Ligue 1	30	11	10	9	32	30	+2	36.67	—N/a	7th	15 August 2015	27 May 2015
Algerian Cup	3	1	1	1	5	2	+3	33.33	Round of 64	Round of 16	19 December 2015	20 February 2016
Total	33	12	11	10	37	32	+5	36.36				

== League table ==
Pos	Team	Pld	W	D	L	GF	GA	GD	Pts
5	ES Sétif	30	11	11	8	31	19	+12	44 (Note: ES Sétif ahead of MO Béjaïa on head-to-head record: ESS–MOB 0–0, MOB–ESS 0–0.)
6	MO Béjaïa	30	11	11	8	33	23	+10	44
7	DRB Tadjenanet	30	11	10	9	32	30	+2	43
8	CS Constantine	30	11	9	10	26	32	−6	42
9	USM El Harrach	30	10	11	9	28	27	+1	41

Updated to match(es) played on 27 May 2016. Source: DZFoot
Rules for classification: 1) points; 2) head-to-head points; 3) head-to-head goal difference; 4) goal difference; 5) total goals; 6) fairplay ranking; 7) playoff.

=== Results summary ===
Overall								Home						Away					
Pld	W	D	L	GF	GA	GD	Pts	W	D	L	GF	GA	GD	W	D	L	GF	GA	GD
30	11	10	9	32	30	+2	43	8	5	2	16	9	+7	3	5	7	16	21	−5

Last updated: 31 January 2015.
Source: Competitive matches

=== Results by round ===
Round	1	2	3	4	5	6	7	8	9	10	11	12	13	14	15	16	17	18	19	20	21	22	23	24	25	26	27	28	29	30
Ground	A	H	A	H	A	H	A	H	A	H	A	H	A	H	A	H	A	H	A	H	A	H	A	H	A	H	A	H	A	H
Result	W	L	W	W	D	D	W	D	D	W	L	W	L	L	L	W	D	D	W	D	D	D	D	W	L	W	L	W	L	L
Position	4	9	3	3	3	4	1	2	2	2	2	2	3	5	6	4	6	6	4	4	3	4	4	3	4	3	6	3	6	7

Updated to match(es) played on 31 January 2015. Source: Competitive matches
A = Away; H = Home; W = Win; D = Draw; L = Loss

=== Matches ===
Win Draw Loss

15 August 2015 Round 1	DRB Tadjenanet	2–1	RC Relizane	Tadjenanet
17:00	Nkolo 45+3'; Sayoud 85' (pen.)	Report; Live TV: None	15' Berramla	Stadium: Lahoua Smaïl Stadium; Referee: Houasnia, Hamou, Bourouba

22 August 2015 Round 2	JS Saoura	1–0	DRB Tadjenanet	Béchar
19:00	Djallit 60'	Report; Live TV: None		Stadium: Stade 20 Août 1955; Referee: Halalchi, Doulache, Abane

29 August 2015 Round 3	DRB Tadjenanet	2–1	USM Blida	Tadjenanet
17:00	Boutebba 11'; Hadef 53'	Report; Live TV: None	20' Melika	Stadium: Lahoua Smaïl Stadium; Referee: Arab, Bayoudh, Hamlaoui

12 September 2015 Round 4	ASM Oran	0–1	DRB Tadjenanet	Oran
17:00		Report; Live TV: Algérie 3	69' (o.g.) Belaid	Stadium: Stade Ahmed Zabana; Referee: Benbrahem, Yahi, Bahloul

19 September 2015 Round 5	DRB Tadjenanet	0–0	USM El Harrach	Tadjenanet
16:30		Report; Live TV: None		Stadium: Lahoua Smaïl Stadium; Referee: Ghorbal, Serradj, Cherchar

28 September 2015 Round 6	DRB Tadjenanet	1–1	JS Kabylie	Tadjenanet
16:30	Tembeng 71'	Report; Live TV: None	52' Boulaouidet	Stadium: Lahoua Smaïl Stadium; Referee: Mial, Selaoudji, Bourouba

4 October 2015 Round 7	MC Alger	2–3	DRB Tadjenanet	Bologhine
18:00	Merzougui 16'; Bouhenna 53'	Report; Live TV: None	37' Guitoune; 69', 86' Chibane	Stadium: Stade Omar Hamadi; Referee: Bachir, Abed, Brahem

17 October 2015 Round 8	DRB Tadjenanet	1–1	NA Hussein Dey	Tadjenanet
16:00	Daouadji 52'	Report; Live TV: None	32' Ouhadda	Stadium: Lahoua Smaïl Stadium; Attendance: 0 (close doors); Referee: Boukhalfa, Itchiali, Zerhouni

24 October 2015 Round 9	RC Arbaâ	2–2	DRB Tadjenanet	Blida
16:00	Zaâlani 32'; Harrouche 87'	Report; Live TV: None	41', 83' Sayoud	Stadium: Stade Frères Brakni; Attendance: 0 (close doors); Referee: Benouza, Ammari, Ayed

27 October 2015 Round 10	DRB Tadjenanet	1–0	ES Sétif	Tadjenanet
15:00	Daouadji 7'	Report; Live TV: None		Stadium: Lahoua Smaïl Stadium; Attendance: 0 (close doors); Referee: Arab, Tamen, Beioud

6 November 2015 Round 11	MC Oran	2–0	DRB Tadjenanet	Oran
16:00	Za'abia 6'; Benyahia 60' (pen.)	Report; Live TV: Canal Algérie		Stadium: Stade Ahmed Zabana; Referee: Bouslimani, El Bachir, Rimouche

21 November 2015 Round 12	DRB Tadjenanet	1–0	CS Constantine	Tadjenanet
15:00	Hadef 28'	Report; Live TV: Algérie 3		Stadium: Lahoua Smaïl Stadium; Referee: Benouza, Oumari, Ayad

27 November 2015 Round 13	MO Béjaïa	2–1	DRB Tadjenanet	Béjaïa
16:00	Salhi 42'; Hamzaoui 85' (pen.)	Report; Live TV: TV Tamazight 4	75' Hadded	Stadium: Stade de l'Unité Maghrébine; Referee: Ghorbal, Hadj Saïd, Benali

12 December 2015 Round 14	DRB Tadjenanet	1–2	USM Alger	Tadjenanet
15:00	Sayoud 44' (pen.)	Report; Live TV: Canal Algérie	9' Chafaï; 79' (pen.) Meftah	Stadium: Lahoua Smaïl Stadium; Referee: Benbrahem, Gourari, Allaoua

26 December 2015 Round 15	CR Belouizdad	3–0	DRB Tadjenanet	Belouizdad
16:00	Yahia-Chérif 49', 58'; Nekkache 51'	Report; Live TV: None		Stadium: Stade 20 Août 1955; Referee: Boukhalfa, Benali, Zerhouni

15 January 2016 Round 16	RC Relizane	0–3	DRB Tadjenanet	Relizane
15:00		Report; Live TV: None	49' Nezouani; 75' Sayoud; 90+1' Chibane	Stadium: Stade Tahar Zoughari; Referee: Miel, Selaouadji, Rachedi

22 January 2016 Round 17	DRB Tadjenanet	0–0	JS Saoura	Tadjenanet
15:00		Report; Live TV: TV Tamazight 4		Stadium: Lahoua Smaïl Stadium; Referee: Houasnia, Boulekrinet, Badache

30 January 2016 Round 18	USM Blida	1–1	DRB Tadjenanet	Blida
15:00	Chérif 1'	Report; Live TV: None	88' (pen.) Sayoud	Stadium: Stade Frères Brakni; Referee: Necib, Tamene, Maghlout

6 February 2016 Round 19	DRB Tadjenanet	2–1	ASM Oran	Tadjenanet
15:00	Khiat 26'; Guitoune 83'	Report; Live TV: None	9' Bentiba	Stadium: Lahoua Smaïl Stadium; Referee: Brahimi, Semsoum, Idir

13 February 2016 Round 20	USM El Harrach	1–1	DRB Tadjenanet	El Harrach
16:00	Boughidah 21'	Report; Live TV: None	7' Chibane	Stadium: Stade 1er Novembre 1954; Referee: Boudrar, Badji, Messaoudi

27 February 2016 Round 21	JS Kabylie	1–1	DRB Tadjenanet	Tizi Ouzou
16:00	Boulaouidet 39'	Report; Live TV: Canal Algérie / Algérie 3	89' (o.g.) Berchiche	Stadium: Stade 1er Novembre 1954; Referee: Arab, Brahimi, Biyoud

12 March 2016 Round 22	DRB Tadjenanet	0–0	MC Alger	Tadjenanet
15:00		Report; Live TV: Algérie 3		Stadium: Lahoua Smaïl Stadium; Referee: Benouza, Benali, Ayed

19 March 2016 Round 23	NA Hussein Dey	2–2	DRB Tadjenanet	Belouizdad
16:00	Herida 28'; Gasmi 70' (pen.)	Report; Live TV: None	77' El Moudene; 90' (pen.) Sayoud	Stadium: Stade 20 Août 1955; Referee: Boukhalfa, Etchiali, Zermombouni

1 April 2016 Round 24	DRB Tadjenanet	2–1	RC Arbaâ	Tadjenanet
15:00	Chibane 11' (pen.), 21'	Report; Live TV: TV Tamazight 4	61' (o.g.) Amrane	Stadium: Lahoua Smaïl Stadium; Referee: Oukil, Serradj, Benali

15 April 2016 Round 25	ES Sétif	1–0	DRB Tadjenanet	Sétif
18:00	Dagoulou 45'	Report; Live TV: Canal Algérie		Stadium: Stade 8 Mai 1945; Referee: Benouza, Omari, Ayad

23 April 2016 Round 26	DRB Tadjenanet	2–0	MC Oran	Tadjenanet
16:00	Demane 6'; Chibane 18' (pen.)	Report; Live TV: Algérie 3		Stadium: Lahoua Smaïl Stadium; Referee: Houasnia, Brahim, Abbane

30 April 2016 Round 27	CS Constantine	1–0	DRB Tadjenanet	Constantine
16:00	Aksas 55'	Report; Live TV: TV Tamazight 4 / Algérie 3		Stadium: Stade Mohamed Hamlaoui; Referee: Brahimi, Bounoua, Bourouba

13 May 2016 Round 28	DRB Tadjenanet	1–0	MO Béjaïa	Tadjenanet
17:30	Guitoune 73'	Report; Live TV: TV Tamazight 4		Stadium: Lahoua Smaïl Stadium; Referee: Boukhalfa, Zerhouni, Benali

20 May 2016 Round 29	USM Alger	2–1	DRB Tadjenanet	Bologhine
17:30	Aradji 64'; Darfalou 83'	Report; Live TV: beIN Sports / TV Tamazight 4	90+1' Chibane	Stadium: Stade Omar Hammadi; Referee: Benouza, Ayad, Benmansour

27 May 2016 Round 30	DRB Tadjenanet	0–1	CR Belouizdad	Tadjenanet
17:30		Report; Live TV: beIN Sports / Al Kass Sports / Algérie 3	52' Derrag	Stadium: Lahoua Smaïl Stadium; Referee: Saidi, Hadji Said, Abid

== Algerian Cup ==
19 December 2015 Round of 64	DRB Tadjenanet	4–0	MB Hassi Messaoud	Tadjenanet
14:15	Chibane 45' (pen.), 79'; Mouaden 53', 75'	[ Report]		Stadium: Lahoua Smaïl Stadium; Referee: Ledraâ, Didou, Flidja

9 January 2016 Round of 32	EC Oued Smar	1–1 (a.e.t.) (1–2 p)	DRB Tadjenanet	El Harrach
14:30	Djahmoune 90'	[ Report]	27' El Mouden	Stadium: Stade 1er Novembre 1954

20 February 2016 Round of 16	USM Bel-Abbès	1–0	DRB Tadjenanet	Sidi Bel Abbès
15:00	Bennai 73'	[ Report]		Stadium: Stade 24 Fevrier 1956; Referee: Mial, Bounoua, Selaouadji

== Squad information ==
=== Playing statistics ===
No.	Pos	Nat	Player	Total		Ligue 1		Algerian Cup	
No.	Pos	Nat	Player	Apps	Goals	Apps	Goals	Apps	Goals
Goalkeepers
1	GK	(Algeria) ALG	Khairi Barki	15	0	13	0	2	0
16	GK	(Algeria) ALG	Farès Belalem	18	0	17	0	1	0
30	GK	(Algeria) ALG	Mohamed Madaci	0	0	0	0	0	0
Defenders
22	DF	(Algeria) ALG	Sofiane Boutebba	30	1	28	1	2	0
29	DF	(Algeria) ALG	Abdelghani Khiat	10	1	10	1	0	0
28	DF	(Algeria) ALG	Mohamed Aib Achref	30	1	28	1	2	0
17	DF	(Algeria) ALG	Mohamed Amrane	26	0	24	0	2	0
	DF	(Algeria) ALG	Antara Khedidja	4	0	3	0	1	0
2	DF	(Algeria) ALG	Ali Guitoune	30	3	28	3	2	0
25	DF	(Algeria) ALG	Tawfiq Ghomrani	8	0	6	0	2	0
Midfielders
11	MF	(Algeria) ALG	Amir Sayoud	31	7	29	7	2	0
	MF	(Algeria) ALG	Abdellah El Moudene	24	4	21	1	3	3
4	MF	(Algeria) ALG	Zakaria Benhocine	2	0	2	0	0	0
12	MF	(Cameroon) CMR	Azongha Tembeng	27	1	24	1	3	0
8	MF	(Algeria) ALG	Hakim Goumidi	12	0	11	0	1	0
13	MF	(Algeria) ALG	Foued Hadded	29	1	26	1	3	0
7	MF	(Algeria) ALG	Abdelmalik Hadef	12	1	11	1	1	0
18	MF	(Algeria) ALG	Abdelhalim Nezouani	25	1	24	1	1	0
21	MF	(Algeria) ALG	Mohamed Lamine Amrani	16	0	15	0	1	0
	MF	(Algeria) ALG	Farid Daoud	13	0	12	0	1	0
Forwards
10	FW	(Algeria) ALG	Youcef Chibane	31	10	29	8	2	2
9	FW	(Republic of the Congo) CGO	Lorry Nkolo	13	1	12	1	1	0
	FW	(Algeria) ALG	Oussama Abdeldjelil	4	0	3	0	1	0
31	FW	(Algeria) ALG	Abdellah Daouadji	22	2	20	2	2	0
	FW	(Algeria) ALG	Hamza Demane	17	1	15	1	2	0
Players transferred out during the season
24	FW	(Algeria) ALG	Abdelhakim Amokrane	8	0	8	0	0	0

Source: Competitions

=== Goalscorers ===
Includes all competitive matches. The list is sorted alphabetically by surname when total goals are equal.

No.	Nat.	Player	Pos.	L 1	AC	TOTAL
10	(Algeria)	Youcef Chibane	FW	8	2	10
11	(Algeria)	Amir Sayoud	MF	7	0	7
	(Algeria)	Abdellah El Moudene	MF	1	3	4
	(Algeria)	Ali Guitoune	DF	3	0	3
31	(Algeria)	Abdellah Daouadji	FW	2	0	2
22	(Algeria)	Sofiane Boutebba	DF	1	0	1
29	(Algeria)	Abdelghani Khiat	DF	1	0	1
28	(Algeria)	Mohamed Aib Achref	DF	1	0	1
12	(Cameroon)	Azongha Tembeng	MF	1	0	1
13	(Algeria)	Foued Hadded	MF	1	0	1
7	(Algeria)	Abdelmalik Hadef	MF	1	0	1
18	(Algeria)	Abdelhalim Nezouani	MF	1	0	1
9	(Republic of the Congo)	Lorry Nkolo	FW	1	0	1
	(Algeria)	Hamza Demane	FW	1	0	1
Own Goals				0	0	0
Totals				32	5	37
