= 2016–17 CA Batna season =

CA Batna
2016–17 season
- Chairman: Farid Nezzar
- Head coach: Toufik Rouabah (until 25 December 2016); Ali Mechiche (from 1 January 2017) (until 1 April 2017); Halim Bouarrara (from 3 April 2017)
- Stadium: Mustapha Seffouhi Stadium, Batna
- Ligue 1: 15th
- Algerian Cup: Round of 32
- Top goalscorer: League: Karim Aribi (4); All: Karim Aribi (4)

In the 2016–17 season, CA Batna is competing in the Ligue 1 for the 23rd season, as well as the Algerian Cup.

== Squad list ==
Players and squad numbers last updated on 18 November 2011.
Note: Flags indicate national team as has been defined under FIFA eligibility rules. Players may hold more than one non-FIFA nationality.

No.	Nat.	Position	Name	Date of Birth (Age)	Signed from
Goalkeepers
Defenders
Midfielders
Forwards

== Non-competitive ==
=== Overview ===
Competition	Record							
Competition	G	W	D	L	GF	GA	GD	Win %
Ligue 1	30	6	7	17	20	42	−22	20.00
Algerian Cup	2	1	0	1	2	2	+0	50.00
Total	32	7	7	18	22	44	−22	21.88

Competition	Start round	Final position/round	First match	Last match
Ligue 1	—N/a	15th	20 August 2016	14 June 2017
Algerian Cup	Round of 64	Round of 32	25 November 2016	16 December 2016

== League table ==
Pos	Team	Pld	W	D	L	GF	GA	GD	Pts	Qualification or relegation
12	Olympique de Médéa	30	10	8	12	32	40	−8	38 (Note: JS Kabylie ahead of Olympique de Médéa on head-to-head record: JSK–OMM 0–1, OMM–JSK 1–2.)	
13	USM El Harrach	30	7	15	8	15	21	−6	36 (Note: RC Relizane ahead of USM El Harrach on head-to-head record: RCR–UEH 0–0, UEH–RCR 0–0 however goal difference in the first leg RCR (−8) UEH (−1).)	
14	RC Relizane (Note: RC Relizane were deducted 3 points.) (R)	30	12	6	12	34	32	+2	36	Relegation to Ligue Professionnelle 2
15	CA Batna (R)	30	6	7	17	20	42	−22	25	Relegation to Ligue Professionnelle 2
16	MO Béjaïa (Note: MO Béjaïa recorded a match lost by penalty against JS Saoura because they were reduced to less than 7 players (Art. 84 Regulation of the Ligue Professionnelle 1 / Art 89 Disciplinary Code). In addition, the Bejaia club was deprived of their share of the television rights for this match. It was also punished by a deduction of 1 point and a fine of 100,000 DA.) (R)	30	3	10	17	23	49	−26	18	Relegation to Ligue Professionnelle 2

Updated to match(es) played on 14 June 2017. Source: DZFoot
Rules for classification: 1) points; 2) head-to-head points; 3) head-to-head goal difference; 4) goal difference; 5) total goals; 6) fairplay ranking; 7) playoff.
(R) Relegated

=== Results summary ===
Overall								Home						Away					
Pld	W	D	L	GF	GA	GD	Pts	W	D	L	GF	GA	GD	W	D	L	GF	GA	GD
30	6	7	17	20	42	−22	25	6	4	5	14	12	+2	0	3	12	6	30	−24

Last updated: 30 January 2016.
Source: Competitive matches

=== Results by round ===
Round	1	2	3	4	5	6	7	8	9	10	11	12	13	14	15	16	17	18	19	20	21	22	23	24	25	26	27	28	29	30
Ground	A	H	A	H	A	A	H	A	H	A	H	A	H	A	H	H	A	H	A	H	H	A	H	A	H	A	H	A	H	A
Result	L	W	L	W	D	L	D	L	W	L	W	L	D	L	D	W	L	L	D	L	D	D	L	L	W	L	L	L	L	L
Position	13	9	9	8	9	11	10	12	11	12	8	9	10	12	13	11	12	12	14	15	15	15	15	15	15	15	15	15	15	15

Updated to match(es) played on 30 January 2016. Source: Competitive matches
A = Away; H = Home; W = Win; D = Draw; L = Loss

=== Matches ===
Win Draw Loss

20 August 2016 Round 1	Olympique de Médéa	1 – 0	CA Batna	Médéa
17:30	Hamia 44' (pen.)	Soccerway report Live TV: None		Stadium: Stade Imam Lyes de Médéa; Referee: Mustapha Ghorbal

27 August 2016 Round 2	CA Batna	1 – 0	USM Bel-Abbès	Batna
17:00	Attouche 90+1'	Report; Live TV: None		Stadium: Stade Seffouhi; Referee: Merzak Halalchi

10 September 2016 Round 3	MC Alger	1 – 0	CA Batna	Bologhine
19:00	Bouguèche 7'	Report; Live TV: None		Stadium: Stade Omar Hamadi; Attendance: 0 (close doors); Referee: Mohamed Boukhalfa

17 September 2016 Round 4	CA Batna	1 – 0	USM El Harrach	Batna
16:30	Hadj Aïssa 61'	Report; Live TV: None		Stadium: Stade Seffouhi; Referee: Redouane Necib

24 September 2016 Round 5	JS Kabylie	1 – 1	CA Batna	Tizi Ouzou
17:45	Aiboud 30'	Report; Live TV: TV Tamazight 4	26' Aribi	Stadium: Stade 1er Novembre 1954; Referee: Mustapha Bessiri

30 September 2016 Round 6	NA Hussein Dey	2 – 0	CA Batna	Mohamed Belouizdad
16:00	Gasmi 8'; Harrouche 87'	Report; Live TV: TV Tamazight 4		Stadium: Stade 20 Août 1955; Referee: Boubekeur Zouaoui

14 October 2016 Round 7	CA Batna	2 – 2	MC Oran	Batna
15:00	Aribi 20'; Griche 32'	Report; Live TV: None	28' Chérif; 88' Bencheikh	Stadium: Stade Seffouhi; Referee: Farouk Mial

22 October 2016 Round 8	ES Sétif	2 – 0	CA Batna	Sétif
17:00	Djahnit 10'; Amokrane 86'	Report; Live TV: Canal Algérie		Stadium: Stade 8 Mai 1945; Referee: Abderrezzak Arab

27 October 2016 Round 9	CA Batna	2 – 1	USM Alger	Batna
15:00	Meftah 20' (o.g.); Hadj Aïssa 62'	Report; Live TV: None	90' Benyahia	Stadium: Stade Mustapha Sefouhi; Referee: Mehdi Abid Charef

27 December 2016 Round 10	MO Béjaïa	2 – 1	CA Batna	Béjaïa
17:00; Match rescheduled due to MO Béjaïa competing in the 2016 CAF Confederation Cup	Messadia 10'; Khadir 90'	Report; Live TV: None	65' Aribi	Stadium: Stade de l'Unité Maghrébine; Referee: Amine Sekhraoui

11 November 2016 Round 11	CA Batna	1 – 0	JS Saoura	Batna
15:00	Aribi 43'	Report; Live TV: None		Stadium: Stade Mustapha Sefouhi; Referee: Lahlou Benbraham

19 November 2016 Round 12	DRB Tadjenanet	4 – 1	CA Batna	Tadjenanet
15:00	Chibane 20'; Nazouani 44'; Aib 73'; El Moudene 75'	Report; Live TV: None	40' Hadj Aïssa	Stadium: Lahoua Smaïl Stadium; Referee: Mohamed Benouza

3 December 2016 Round 13	CA Batna	0 – 0	CS Constantine	Batna
15:00		Report; Live TV: None		Stadium: Mustapha Seffouhi Stadium; Referee: Merzak Halalchi

9 December 2016 Round 14	CR Belouizdad	1 – 0	CA Batna	Mohamed Belouizdad
16:00	Draoui 77'	Report; Live TV: None		Stadium: August 20, 1955 Stadium; Attendance: 0 (close doors); Referee: Mohamed Benouza

24 December 2016 Round 15	CA Batna	1 – 1	RC Relizane	Batna
14:30	Attouche 55'	Report; Live TV: None	79' Benayad	Stadium: Mustapha Seffouhi Stadium; Referee: Marzouk Brahimi

21 January 2017 Round 16	CA Batna	3 – 0	Olympique de Médéa	Batna
14:30	Benmansour 30'; Behloul 33'; Mesfar 68'	Report; Live TV: None		Stadium: Mustapha Seffouhi Stadium; Referee: Lotfi Bekouassa

28 January 2017 Round 17	USM Bel-Abbès	2 – 0	CA Batna	Sidi Bel Abbès
16:00	Bouguelmouna 10', 35'	Report; Live TV: Canal Algérie		Stadium: Stade 24 Fevrier 1956; Referee: Lotfi Bekouassa

3 February 2017 Round 18	CA Batna	1 – 2	MC Alger	Batna
15:00	Benmansour 47'	Report; Live TV: None	17' Seguer; 45+1' Nekkache	Stadium: Mustapha Seffouhi Stadium; Referee: Abderrezzak Arab

11 February 2017 Round 19	USM El Harrach	1 – 1	CA Batna	El Harrach
15:00	Dahar 19'	Report; Live TV: None	71' Bitam	Stadium: November 1, 1954 Stadium; Attendance: 0 (close doors); Referee: Ahmed Bouzrar

21 April 2017 Round 20	CA Batna	0 – 1	JS Kabylie	Batna
16:00; Match rescheduled due to JS Kabylie competing in the 2017 CAF Confederation Cup		Report; Live TV: None	50' Guemroud	Stadium: Mustapha Seffouhi Stadium; Referee: Abderrezzak Arab

24 February 2017 Round 21	CA Batna	0 – 0	NA Hussein Dey	Batna
15:00		Report; Live TV: None		Stadium: Mustapha Seffouhi Stadium; Referee: Mohamed Boukhalfa

3 March 2017 Round 22	MC Oran	0 – 0	CA Batna	Oran
16:00		Report; Live TV: Canal Algérie / EPTV Terrestre		Stadium: Ahmed Zabana Stadium; Referee: Lahlou Benbraham

10 March 2017 Round 23	CA Batna	0 – 2	ES Sétif	Batna
15:00		Report; Live TV: None	65' Aït Ouamar; 90+4' Amokrane	Stadium: Mustapha Seffouhi Stadium; Attendance: 0 (close doors); Referee: Farouk Mial

29 April 2017 Round 24	USM Alger	3 – 0	CA Batna	Bologhine
17:00	Bitam 60'; Darfalou 72', 87'	Report; Live TV: Al-Kass Sports / TV Tamazight 4		Stadium: Omar Hamadi Stadium; Attendance: 5.000; Referee: Mohamed Saïdi

6 May 2017 Round 25	CA Batna	2 – 0	MO Béjaïa	Batna
16:00	Kherbache 11'; Behloul 72'	Report; Live TV: None		Stadium: Mustapha Seffouhi Stadium; Attendance: 0 (close doors); Referee: Lotfi Bekouassa

13 May 2017 Round 26	JS Saoura	2 – 1	CA Batna	Béchar
19:00	Bourdim 25' (pen.); Zaidi 40'	Report; Live TV: None	90+2' Dif	Stadium: August 20, 1955 Stadium; Referee: Amine Sekhraoui

20 May 2017 Round 27	CA Batna	0 – 2	DRB Tadjenanet	Batna
16:00		Report; Live TV: None	75' Noubli; 90+5' Demane	Stadium: Mustapha Seffouhi Stadium; Attendance: 0 (close doors); Referee: Lyés Boukouassa

7 June 2017 Round 28	CS Constantine	3 – 1	CA Batna	Constantine
17:00	Manucho 10'; Bezzaz 12'; Zerara 22'	Report; Live TV: None	13' (pen.) Djarbou	Stadium: Ramadan Ben-Abdelmalek Stadium; Referee: Merzak Halalchi

10 June 2017 Round 29	CA Batna	0 – 1	CR Belouizdad	Batna
17:00		Report; Live TV: None	45+1' (pen.) Hamia	Stadium: Mustapha Seffouhi Stadium; Referee: Redouane Necib

14 June 2017 Round 30	RC Relizane	5 – 0	CA Batna	Relizane
17:00	Tebbi 31'; Derrag 37'; Belmokhtar 70'; Mazouni 71'; Benayad 85'	Report; Live TV: None		Stadium: Stade Tahar Zoughari; Attendance: 0 (close doors); Referee: Amine Sekhraoui

== Algerian Cup ==
25 November 2016 Round of 64	CA Batna	2–1	JS Azazga	Batna
15:00	Babouche 71' (pen.); Rebouh 75'	Report; Live TV: None	Khenab 55' (o.g.)	Stadium: Stade Seffouhi; Referee: Fesih, Belamri, Belagha

16 December 2016 Round of 32	USM Alger	1–0	CA Batna	Bologhine
16:00	Meftah 83'	Report; Live TV: EPTV Terrestre / Canal Algérie		Stadium: Omar Hamadi Stadium; Referee: Ghorbal, Itchiali, Hadj Said

== Squad information ==
=== Playing statistics ===
No.	Pos	Nat	Player	Total		Ligue 1		Algerian Cup	
No.	Pos	Nat	Player	Apps	Goals	Apps	Goals	Apps	Goals
Goalkeepers
	GK	(Algeria) ALG	Mouloud Abdelaziz	1	0	1	0	0	0
1	GK	(Algeria) ALG	Abdelhamid Abdesselam	2	0	2	0	0	0
30	GK	(Algeria) ALG	Fares Belkerrouche	15	0	15	0	0	0
16	GK	(Algeria) ALG	Sid Ahmed Rafik Mazouzi	14	0	14	0	0	0
	GK	(Algeria) ALG	Hamdan Mahboubi	1	0	1	0	0	0
Defenders
22	DF	(Algeria) ALG	Mohamed Amrane	18	0	18	0	0	0
15	DF	(Algeria) ALG	Réda Babouche	26	0	26	0	0	0
13	DF	(Algeria) ALG	Khalfallah Belhaoua	10	0	10	0	0	0
48	DF	(Algeria) ALG	Abdelhak Bellaoui	3	0	3	0	0	0
4	DF	(Algeria) ALG	Abderrezak Bitam	14	1	14	1	0	0
12	DF	(Algeria) ALG	Slimane Bouteldja	4	0	4	0	0	0
29	DF	(Algeria) ALG	Adlen Griche	17	1	17	1	0	0
18	DF	(Algeria) ALG	Khalil Khennab	19	0	19	0	0	0
	DF	(Algeria) ALG	Oussama Rasghezal	2	0	2	0	0	0
	DF	(Algeria) ALG	Saïdi	1	0	1	0	0	0
3	DF	(Algeria) ALG	Ayache Ziouache	8	0	8	0	0	0
Midfielders
	MF	(Algeria) ALG	Maher Azzouz	3	0	3	0	0	0
14	MF	(Algeria) ALG	Bilal Behloul	25	2	25	2	0	0
5	MF	(Algeria) ALG	Mohamed Zinelabidine Benmansour	10	2	10	2	0	0
26	MF	(Algeria) ALG	Farid Daoud	20	0	20	0	0	0
10	MF	(Algeria) ALG	Lotfi Dif	13	1	13	1	0	0
21	MF	(Algeria) ALG	Abdelhakim Djerbou	11	1	11	1	0	0
8	MF	(Algeria) ALG	Houd Ahmed Taha Djoghma	22	0	22	0	0	0
	MF	(Algeria) ALG	Amine Ghodbane	5	0	5	0	0	0
37	MF	(Algeria) ALG	Ayache Gueraïche	1	0	1	0	0	0
6	MF	(Algeria) ALG	Lazhar Hadj Aïssa	12	3	12	3	0	0
17	MF	(Algeria) ALG	Housseyn Selmi	25	0	25	0	0	0
Forwards
52	FW	(Algeria) ALG	Mohamed Hichem Attouche	23	2	23	2	0	0
41	FW	(Algeria) ALG	Achraf Bouzidi	2	0	2	0	0	0
34	FW	(Algeria) ALG	Okba Brahimi	1	0	1	0	0	0
19	FW	(Algeria) ALG	Imad Brahmia	6	0	6	0	0	0
38	FW	(Algeria) ALG	Mehdi Hendi	2	0	2	0	0	0
11	FW	(Algeria) ALG	Mohamed Ismail Kherbache	19	1	19	1	0	0
20	FW	(Algeria) ALG	Oussama Mesfar	23	1	23	1	0	0
25	FW	(Algeria) ALG	Yanis Nicolas Roumadi	9	0	9	0	0	0
46	FW	(Algeria) ALG	Abdelmoumene Yousfi	1	0	1	0	0	0
Players transferred out during the season
9	FW	(Algeria) ALG	Karim Aribi	14	4	14	4	0	0
2	DF	(Algeria) ALG	Fateh Talah	7	0	7	0	0	0

Source: Competitions

== Squad list ==
As of January 15, 2017 Note: Flags indicate national team as defined under FIFA eligibility rules; some limited exceptions apply. Players may hold more than one non-FIFA nationality.

No.	Pos.	Nation	Player
1	GK	ALG	Abdelhamid Abdesselam
4	DF	ALG	Abderrezak Bitam
5	DF	ALG	Mohamed Zinelabidine Benmansour
6	MF	ALG	Lazhar Hadj Aïssa
8	MF	ALG	Houd Ahmed Taha Djoghma
10	FW	ALG	Lotfi Dif
11	FW	ALG	Mohamed Ismail Kherbache
12	MF	ALG	Slimane Bouteldja
14	MF	ALG	Bilal Behloul
15	DF	ALG	Réda Babouche (captain)
16	GK	ALG	Sid Ahmed Rafik Mazouzi

No.	Pos.	Nation	Player
17	DF	ALG	Housseyn Selmi
18	MF	ALG	Khalil Khennab
19	FW	ALG	Imad Brahmia
20	FW	ALG	Oussama Mesfar
21	FW	ALG	Abdelhakim Djerbou
22	DF	ALG	Mohamed Amrane
23	DF	ALG	Khalfallah Belhaoua
25	FW	ALG	Yanis Nicolas Roumadi
26	MF	ALG	Farid Daoud
29	DF	ALG	Adlen Griche
30	GK	ALG	Fares Belkerrouche
