= Salim Mahsas =

Algerian footballer (born 1991)

Personal information
- Date of birth: 18 June 1991 (age 35)
- Place of birth: Paris 13e, France
- Position: Midfielder

Team information
- Current team: US Ivry

Youth career
- Paris FC

Senior career*
Years	Team	Apps	(Gls)
2012–2014	US Ivry	70	(8)
2014	USM Bel-Abbès	?	(?)
2015–2017	RC Arbaâ	21	(4)
2017	DRB Tadjenanet	2	(0)
2017–	US Ivry	10	(2)
- * Club domestic league appearances and goals as of 3 January 2018

Salim Mahsas (born 18 June 1991) is an Algerian footballer who plays for US Ivry as a midfielder.
