= Karim Aribi =

Algerian football player (born 1994)

Personal information
- Date of birth: 24 June 1994 (age 32)
- Place of birth: Réghaïa, Algeria
- Height: 1.92 m (6 ft 4 in)
- Position: Forward

Team information
- Current team: JS El Biar
- Number: 14

Youth career
- NARB Réghaïa

Senior career*
Years	Team	Apps	(Gls)
–2013	NARB Réghaïa		
2013–2016	JSM Béjaïa		
2016	CA Batna	14	(4)
2017–2018	CR Belouizdad	32	(4)
2018	DRB Tadjenanet	14	(10)
2019–2020	Étoile Sahel	28	(6)
2020–2022	Nîmes	21	(0)
2022–2023	CR Belouizdad	25	(7)
2023	Al-Qadsiah	15	(8)
2023–2024	Ohod	26	(5)
2024–2025	MC Oran	25	(1)
2025–2026	Al-Talaba	22	(3)
2026–	JS El Biar	1	(0)

International career^{‡}
2022–	Algeria A'	9	(1)
2020–	Algeria	1	(0)
- * Club domestic league appearances and goals as of 3 September 2026 ‡ National team caps and goals as of 17 July 2024

Karim Aribi (born 24 June 1994) is an Algerian professional footballer who plays as forward for JS El Biar and the Algeria national team.

== Club career ==
=== Étoile Sahel ===
On 2 January 2019, Aribi joined to Étoile Sahel for four seasons, coming from DRB Tadjenanet. He made his debut for the team in the Ligue Professionnelle 1 during a win against Club Africain, later Aribi scored his first goal with the club against CS Hammam-Lif in 2–1 victory. On 18 April, in the Arab Club Champions Cup final against Al-Hilal, Aribi scored the first goal to lead Étoile Sahel to win the title, which is the first with his club. On 11 August, He made his debut in the CAF Champions League and in the same match scored his first goal against Hafia. two week later against the same club scored a super hat-trick. After the CAF Champions League ended Karim Aribi won the top scorer title with 11 goals.

=== Nîmes ===
On 2 October 2020, Aribi signed for Ligue 1 side Nîmes Olympique on a three-year contract.

=== Al-Qadsiah ===
On 30 January 2023, Aribi joined Saudi Arabian club Al-Qadsiah.

=== Ohod ===
On 31 July 2023, Aribi joined Saudi First Division side Ohod.

=== MC Oran ===
On 16 July 2024, Aribi joined MC Oran.

=== Al-Talaba SC ===
On 31 July 2025, Aribi joined Iraqi club Al-Talaba SC.

=== JS El Biar ===
On 7 August 2026, he joined JS El Biar.

== Career statistics ==
=== Club ===
As of 1 August 2020

Appearances and goals by club, season and competition
Club	Season	League			Cup (Note: Includes the Algerian Cup and Tunisian Cup)		Continental		Other		Total	
Club	Season	Division	Apps	Goals	Apps	Goals	Apps	Goals	Apps	Goals	Apps	Goals
CA Batna	2016–17	Algerian Ligue 1	14	4	0	0	—		—		14	4
CR Belouizdad	2016–17	Algerian Ligue 1	13	1	3	0	—		—		16	1
CR Belouizdad	2017–18	Algerian Ligue 1	19	3	2	1	5 (Note: All appearance(s) in Confederation Cup)	0	—		26	4
CR Belouizdad	Total		32	4	5	1	5	0	—		42	5
DRB Tadjenanet	2018–19	Algerian Ligue 1	14	10	1	0	—		—		15	10
Étoile Sahel	2018–19	Tunisian Ligue 1	10	3	0	0	7	1	4 (Note: All appearance(s) in Arab Club Champions Cup)	1	21	5
Étoile Sahel	2019–20	Tunisian Ligue 1	18	3	0	0	8 (Note: All appearance(s) in Champions League)	11	0	0	26	14
Étoile Sahel	Total		28	6	0	0	15	12	4	1	47	19
Career total			88	24	6	1	20	12	4	1	118	39

== Honours ==
=== Club ===
CR Belouizdad

- Algerian Cup: 2017

Étoile Sahel

- Arab Club Champions Cup: 2018–19
