= Smaïl Lahoua Stadium =

Multi-use stadium in Tadjenanet, Algeria

Coordinates: 36.116667°N 6°E

- Interactive map of Smaïl Lahoua Stadium
- Full name: Smaïl Lahoua Stadium
- Location: Baladiat Tadjenanet, 43220, Tadjenanet, Algeria
- Owner: DJS Tadjenanet
- Operator: DRB Tadjenanet
- Capacity: 9,000
- Surface: Artificial turf

Tenant
- DRB Tadjenanet

Smaïl Lahoua Stadium (Arabic: ملعب إسماعيل لهوة), is a multi-use stadium in Tadjenanet, Algeria. It is currently used mostly for football matches stadium is the home ground of DRB Tadjenanet. The stadium holds 9,000 spectators.
