= Tadjenanet =

Coordinates: 36°07′N 5°59′E

Tadjenanet تاجنانت Saint-Donat
- Commune and town
- Country: Algeria
- Province: Mila Province

Government
  - President of commune: Gueriche Iskander

Population (2008)
  - Total: 41,833
- Time zone: UTC+1 (CET)
- Postal code: 43007
- Area code: 213

Tadjenanet (Arabic: تاجنانت, Tamazight: ⵜⴰⴵⵏⴰⵏⵜ), formerly called Saint-Donat, is a town and commune in Mila Province, Algeria.

At the 2008 census it had a population of 53,536.

== Geography ==
Tadjenanet is located 75 km south-west of Mila and 18 km from Chelghoum Laïd on the RN 5 connecting Algiers to Constantine. At an altitude of 850 m, it is crossed from West to East by the Oued Rhumel. 10 km to the south is the Ouled Abdennour forest, backed by the Djebel Rokbet ank Djmal. It is located 75 km from Constantine, 96 km from Batna, 56 km from Sétif and finally 23 km from the town of El Eulma, known for its wholesale market which generates significant trade flows. 20 km to the south is the wilaya of Batna.

== History ==
The colonial village of Saint-Donat, known as Tadjenanet today, was established in 1872 on the lands of the municipality of Oued Athmania, on the edge of the Tadjnit Valley. It is located on the road from Algiers to Constantine. The origin of the name is not as commonly believed among the city's residents, who tell stories that it was either a "Garden of Olives" (Jnan Zaytoun) or that there was a "Crown for a Roman Queen named Nanet." Instead, it is derived from "Taqqennant" or "Tayennant," meaning a flat land, as it sits on an expanse of entirely level terrain.

== Demography ==
The city and its surroundings are home to various populations from different ethnicities, including the most important which is that of the Chaoui, after the independence of Algeria, several Berber tribes from the south including the province of Batna settled in the city and contributed to its development. Indeed, the vast majority of the inhabitants of Tadjenanet call themselves "Arabized" chaouis and consider that the city is in a sense an integral part of the Aurès, in particular in relation to the proximity of the wilaya of Batna. Its culture is similar to that found in the Aurès, especially with folklore, gastronomy and clothing style.

Historical population

| Year | Pop. | ±% |
|---|---|---|
| 1884 | 181 colons | — |
| 1892 | 251 colons | — |
| 1897 | 688 colons | — |
| 1902 | 517 colons | — |

| Year | Pop. | ±% |
|---|---|---|
| 1987 | 30,237 | — |
| 1998 | 43,151 | +42.7% |
| 2008 | 53,536 | +24.1% |

Source: recensement

== Economy ==
The city is known especially by its weekly market of imported products, considered to be the first in eastern Algeria and which is the main cause of economic and social development of the city.

The weekly wholesale clothing market in Tadjenanet is a major shopping destination.

== Administration ==
List of presidents of the city
| Period | | President | Party |
|---|---|---|---|
| 1967 | 1971 | Sedik BAGHDOUCH | |
| 2002 | 2007 | Abderrahmane Nekaâ | |
| 2007 | 2010 | Abdelhakim CHETTIH | FLN |
| 2010 | 2012 | Wehab MERZOUGUI | FLN |
| 2012 | 2017 | Djamel GUERICH | FLN |
| 2018 | 2019 | Abdelmalek BENYAHIA | RND |
| 2019 | 2021 | Adel BOUGUERN | RND |
| 2021 | NOW | Iskander GUERICHE | |

== Sports ==
The city of Tadjenanet, located in Algeria, is home to the DRB Tadjenanet football team. Founded in 1971, the club achieved a significant milestone in its history in 2015 when it secured a spot in the National Division 1, marking its debut in the elite football league of Algeria. However, the club faced administrative conflicts and financial crises in 2021, leading to its unfortunate dissolution. Despite the challenges it encountered, DRB Tadjenanet's presence in National Division 1 was a testament to the city's passion for football and its aspirations to compete at the highest levels of Algerian football.

ES Tadjenanet is a prominent volleyball club based in Tadjenanet, Algeria, founded in 2003.
