= DRB Tadjenanet =

Algerian football club

- Full name: Difaa Riadhi Baladiat Tadjenanet, DRBT
- Founded: 1971 (as Difaa Riadhi Baladiat Tadjenanet)
- Dissolved: November 13, 2021; 4 years ago
- Ground: Smaïl Lahoua Stadium
- Capacity: 9,000
Home colours	Away colours

Difaa Riadhi Baladiat Tadjenanet (Arabic: الدفاع الرياضي لبلدية تاجنانت), more commonly known as DRB Tadjenanet, was a football club based in Tadjenanet, Algeria. The club was founded in 1971 and its colours were blue and white. Their home stadium, Smaïl Lahoua Stadium, has a capacity of some 9,000 spectators.

== History ==
The club was founded in 1971.

In 2021, after the relegation to Division d'Honneur, the club was dissolved.

== Honours ==
=== Domestic competitions ===
- Algerian Ligue Professionnelle 2

Runner-up (1): 2014–15

== Managers ==
- (Algeria) Liamine Bougherara (July 1, 2013–)
