= 2014–15 MC Alger season =

MC Alger
2014–15 season
- Chairman: Abdelkrim Raissi
- Head coach: Boualem Charef (from 27 May 2014) (until 10 November 2014); Artur Jorge (from 3 January 2015)
- Stadium: Stade Omar Hamadi
- Ligue 1: 12th
- Algerian Cup: Round of 64
- CAF Champions League: Preliminary round
- Top goalscorer: League: Kaled Gourmi (10); All: Kaled Gourmi (10)
Home colours

In the 2014–15 season, MC Alger competed in the Ligue 1 for the 44th season, as well as the Algerian Cup. It is their 12th consecutive season in the top flight of Algerian football.

== Squad list ==
Players and squad numbers last updated on 18 November 2014.
Note: Flags indicate national team as has been defined under FIFA eligibility rules. Players may hold more than one non-FIFA nationality.

No.	Nat.	Position	Name	Date of Birth (Age)	Signed from
Goalkeepers
1	(Algeria)	GK	Faouzi Chaouchi	5 December 1984 (aged 30)	(Algeria) ES Sétif
12	(Algeria)	GK	Houari Djemili	15 May 1987 (aged 27)	(Algeria) WA Tlemcen
-	(Algeria)	GK	Farid Chaâl	3 July 1994 (aged 20)	Youth system
Defenders
3	(Cameroon)	RB	Patrick Ngoula	1 January 1993 (aged 22)	(Cameroon)
4	(Algeria)	RB	Koceila Berchiche	5 August 1985 (aged 29)	(Algeria) MC El Eulma
5	(Algeria)	RB	Amine Aksas	5 March 1983 (aged 31)	(Algeria) CR Belouizdad
27	(Algeria)	RB	Abderahmane Hachoud	2 July 1988 (aged 26)	(Algeria) ES Setif
13	(Algeria)	RB	Redouane Bachiri	27 October 1982 (aged 32)	(Algeria) JSM Béjaïa
22	(Algeria)	RB	Ayoub Azzi	14 September 1989 (aged 25)	(Algeria) USM El Harrach
42	(France)	RB	Sofiane Ben Braham	1 February 1990 (aged 24)	(France) AC Amiens
26	(Algeria)	RB	Sabri Gharbi	26 May 1987 (aged 27)	(Algeria) ASO Chlef
-	(Algeria)	RB	Mohamed El Hadi Bendoukha		(Algeria) CA Batna
-	(Algeria)	RB	Mohamed Hikem	12 April 1992 (aged 22)	(Algeria) JS Kabylie
	(Algeria)	RB	Mohamed Amine Madani		Youth system
-	(Algeria)	RB	Toufik Zeghdane	17 September 1992 (aged 22)	(France) CS Sedan
Midfielders
11	(Algeria)	CM	Sid Ahmed Aouedj	2 July 1991 (aged 23)	(Algeria) JS Kabylie
7	(Algeria)	CM	Kaled Gourmi	16 April 1986 (aged 28)	(Algeria) ES Sétif
14	(Algeria)	CM	Amir Karaoui	3 August 1987 (aged 27)	(Algeria) ES Sétif
10	(Algeria)	CM	Billal Ouali	15 May 1987 (aged 27)	(Algeria) Paradou AC
24	(Algeria)	CM	Oussama Chita	31 October 1996 (aged 18)	Youth system
-	(Algeria)	CM	Karim Hendou	27 May 1986 (aged 28)	(Algeria) USM El Harrach
-	(Algeria)	CM	Sofiane Khadir		(Algeria) USM El Harrach
	(Algeria)	CM	Yahya Khiter		Youth system
Forwards
9	(Cameroon)	RW	Christopher Mendouga	12 April 1992 (aged 22)	(Cameroon)
17	(Algeria)	RW	Moustapha Djallit	21 September 1983 (aged 31)	(Algeria) JSM Béjaïa
77	(Algeria)	RW	Ali Sami Yachir	2 January 1985 (aged 29)	(Algeria) USM El Harrach
-	(Brazil)	RW	Roberson de Arruda Alves	29 June 1989 (aged 25)	(Brazil) Esporte Clube Juventude

== Competitions ==
=== Overview ===
Competition	Record								Started round	Final position / round	First match	Last match
Competition	G	W	D	L	GF	GA	GD	Win %	Started round	Final position / round	First match	Last match
Ligue 1	30	10	9	11	33	31	+2	33.33	—N/a	12th	16 August 2014	29 May 2015
Algerian Cup	1	0	0	1	1	2	−1	0.00	Round of 64		13 December 2014	
Algerian Super Cup	1	1	0	0	1	0	+1	100.00	Final	winners	9 August 2014	
CAF Confederation	2	0	1	1	0	2	−2	0.00	Preliminary round		14 February 2015	28 February 2015
Total	34	11	10	13	35	35	+0	32.35				

== Algerian Super Cup ==
The 2014 Algerian Super Cup is the 8th edition of Algerian Super Cup, competition with only one match organized by the professional Football League (LFP) and the Algerian Football Federation (FAF) since 2013, which opposes Algerian Ligue Professionnelle 1 the winner of the Algerian Cup. the competition takes place this season Stade Mustapha Tchaker to Blida For the second time.

The meeting therefore opposed USM Alger 2013-2014 champion of Algeria, the MC Alger, winner of the 2013–14 Algerian Cup. The rules of the game are: the duration of the game is 90 minutes and in case of a tie, a session penalties is performed to separate the teams. Three substitutions are allowed for each team.

9 August 2014	USM Alger	0-1	MC Alger	Blida
17:30 UTC+1	(yellow card) 90' Koudri	Report	Aouedj 81'; Azzi (yellow card) 69'; Karaoui (yellow card) 87'	Stadium: Stade Mustapha Tchaker; Attendance: 7.000; Referee: Mehdi Abid Charef

=== Ligue 1 ===
The Ligue 1 2014-2015 is the fifty-first edition of Algerian Ligue Professionnelle 1 and the fifth under the name Ligue 1. Division opposes sixteen clubs in a series of thirty meetings. The best in the league qualify for the African cups that are the Champions League (the podium) and Confederation Cup (the third and the winner national cup).

The relegated the previous season, JSM Bejaia on CA Bordj Bou Arreridj and CRB Ain Fakroun are replaced by USM Bel-Abbès, Ligue 2 in 2013-2014 after a year's absence, the ASM Oran, 7 years after his last appearance at the highest national level, and NA Hussein Dey relegated to Ligue 2 during the 2010–2011 season.

==== League table ====
Pos	Team	Pld	W	D	L	GF	GA	GD	Pts	Qualification or relegation
10	RC Arbaâ	30	12	4	14	28	35	−7	40 (Note: NAHD 3-0 RCA; RCA 0-1 NAHD)	
11	JS Saoura	30	10	9	11	26	29	−3	39 (Note: JSS: 9 points; MCA: 6 points; JSK: 3 points)	
12	MC Alger	30	10	9	11	33	31	+2	39	
13	JS Kabylie	30	11	6	13	35	35	0	39	
14	MC El Eulma (R)	30	11	5	14	40	36	+4	38	2014–15 Algerian Ligue Professionnelle 2

Updated to match(es) played on 29 May 2015. Source: DZFoot
Rules for classification: 1) points; 2) head-to-head points; 3) head-to-head goal difference; 4) goal difference; 5) total goals; 6) fairplay ranking; 7) playoff
(R) Relegated

==== Results summary ====
Overall								Home						Away					
Pld	W	D	L	GF	GA	GD	Pts	W	D	L	GF	GA	GD	W	D	L	GF	GA	GD
30	10	9	11	33	31	+2	39	9	3	3	20	10	+10	1	6	8	13	21	−8

Last updated: 29 December 2014.
Source: Competitive matches

==== Results by round ====
Round	1	2	3	4	5	6	7	8	9	10	11	12	13	14	15	16	17	18	19	20	21	22	23	24	25	26	27	28	29	30
Ground	H	A	H	A	H	A	H	A	H	A	H	A	H	A	H	A	H	A	H	A	H	A	H	A	H	A	H	A	H	A
Result	L	W	D	W	D	D	L	L	L	L	L	L	D	D	L	W	D	W	L	W	L	W	W	W	W	D	D	D	W	L
Position	12	5	7	3	5	5	10	13	15	15	16	16	16	16	16	16	16	15	16	14	16	15	13	12	9	11	9	11	8	12

Updated to match(es) played on 29 December 2014. Source: Competitive matches
A = Away; H = Home; W = Win; D = Draw; L = Loss

==== Matches ====
16 August 2014 1	MC El Eulma	2–1	MC Alger	El Eulma
18:00	Derrardja 13', 17'	Report	90+2' Hachoud	Stadium: Stade Messaoud Zougar; Referee: Benbraham, Bouchebah, Allaoua

23 August 2014 2	MC Alger	3–1	ASO Chlef	Algiers
17:45	Hachoud 40'; Aouedj 63'; Sylla 82'	Report	42' Tedjar	Stadium: Stade Omar Hamadi; Referee: Bichari, Gourari, Salaouadji

12 September 2014 3	NA Hussein Dey	1–1	MC Alger	Algiers
17:45	Ouznadji 81'	Report	5' (pen.) Gourmi	Stadium: Stade 20 Août 1955; Referee: Bouakassa, Bounoua, Bourouba

20 September 2014 4	MC Alger	2–1	JS Saoura	Algiers
17:45	Sylla 43'; Aksas 82'	Report	42' El Amali	Stadium: Stade Omar Hammadi; Referee: Achouri, Amri, Bouguerara

27 September 2014 5	MO Bejaia	2–2	MC Alger	Bejaia
19:00	Ferhat 57'; Ballo 74'	Report	27' Berchiche; 65' Gourmi	Stadium: Stade de l'Unité Maghrébine; Referee: Bachi, Etchiali, Hadj Saïd

2 October 2014 6	MC Alger	0–0	ASM Oran	Algiers
19:00		Report		Stadium: Stade Omar Hammadi; Referee: Aouina, Benaissa, Chenaoua

18 October 2014 7	USM Bel-Abbès	2–1	MC Alger	Sidi Bel Abbès
18:00	Bouguèche 48'; Abdat 90'	Report	54' Sylla	Stadium: Stade 24 Fevrier 1956; Referee: Arab, Mehira, Bioud

30 October 2014 9	MC Alger	2–4	JS Kabylie	Algiers
18:00	Berchiche 13'; Hachoud 22'	Report	23' (pen.) Rial; 27' Yesli; 44' Ferguene; 79' Khodja	Stadium: Stade Omar Hammadi; Referee: Abid-Charef, Tamen, Boulfelfel

8 November 2014 10	CR Belouizdad	2–0	MC Alger	Algiers
18:00	Khellili 17'; Rebih 74'	Report		Stadium: Stade 20 Août 1955; Referee: Bichari, Gourari, Salaouadji

22 November 2014 11	MC Alger	0–1	USM Alger	Algiers
18:00		Report	47' Baïteche	Stadium: Stade Omar Hammadi; Attendance: 0 (close doors); Referee: Benouza, Omari, Ayad

25 November 2014 8	ES Sétif	2–1	MC Alger	Sétif
18:00	Benyettou 14'; Megateli 67'	Report	68' Zeghdane	Stadium: Stade 8 Mai 1945; Referee: Ghorbal, Serradj, Hadj Saïd

28 November 2014 12	USM El Harrach	1–0	MC Alger	Algiers
15:00	Abid 72'	Report		Stadium: Stade 1er Novembre 1954; Referee: Amalou, Azrine, Benbachir

6 December 2014 13	MC Alger	0–0	CS Constantine	Algiers
16:00		Report		Stadium: Stade Omar Hammadi; Referee: Necib, Maghlout, Benacer

20 December 2014 14	MC Oran	1–1	MC Alger	Oran
16:00	Larbi 22'	Report	90' (pen.) Gourmi	Stadium: Stade Ahmed Zabana; Referee: Achouri, Amri, Bougherara

30 December 2014 15	MC Alger	0–2	RC Arbaâ	Algiers
16:00		Report	27' Ferhani; 31' Darfalou	Stadium: Stade Omar Hammadi; Referee: Saïdi, Bechirene, Rezgane

January 2015 16	MC Alger	4–0	MC El Eulma	Algiers
17:00	Djallit 29' (pen.); Mendouga 52'; Gourmi 79', 85'	Report		Stadium: Stade Omar Hammadi; Referee: Aouina, Benaissa, Chenaoua

24 January 2015 17	ASO Chlef	0–0	MC Alger	Chlef
16:00		Report		Stadium: Stade Mohamed Boumezrag; Referee: Ghorbal, Cherchar, Serradj

31 January 2015 18	MC Alger	1–0	NA Hussein Dey	Algiers
16:00	Hachoud 41'	Report		Stadium: Stade Omar Hammadi; Referee: Houasnia, Gourari, Boulekrinet

6 February 2015 19	JS Saoura	2–1	MC Alger	Béchar
15:00	Tiouli 8'; Aoudou 55'	Report	81' Aouedj	Stadium: Stade 20 Août 1955; Referee: Boukhalfa, Zerhouni, Ayad

10 February 2015 20	MC Alger	1–0	MO Béjaïa	Algiers
16:00	Gourmi 29'	Report		Stadium: Stade Omar Hammadi; Referee: Bichari, Gourari, Salaouadji

24 February 2015 21	ASM Oran	2–1	MC Alger	Oran
15:00	Djemaouni 4'; Bentiba 12'	Report	52' Djallit	Stadium: Stade Ahmed Zabana; Referee: Abid Charef, Tamen, Boulfelfel

7 March 2015 22	MC Alger	1–0	USM Bel-Abbès	Algiers
16:00	Gourmi 63'	Report		Stadium: Stade Omar Hammadi; Attendance: 0 (close doors); Referee: Bahloul, Amri, Bougherara

21 March 2015 23	MC Alger	1–0	ES Sétif	Algiers
16:00	Aouadj 48'	Report		Stadium: Stade Omar Hammadi; Referee: Mial, Semsoum, Idir

28 March 2015 24	JS Kabylie	1–2	MC Alger	Tizi Ouzou
16:00	Ziti 8'	Report	26' Ben Braham; 36' Djallit	Stadium: Stade du 1er Novembre 1954; Referee: Abid-Charef, Tamen, Boufelfel

17 April 2015 25	MC Alger	3–0	CR Belouizdad	Algiers
16:00	Gourmi 60'; Bachiri 72'; Aouedj 76'	Report		Stadium: Stade Omar Hammadi; Attendance: 0 (close doors); Referee: Boukhalfa, Etchiali, Tamen

25 April 2015 26	USM Alger	0–0	MC Alger	Algiers
17:00		Report; Live TV: None		Stadium: Stade Omar Hammadi; Attendance: 0 (close doors); Referee: Mial, Idir, Semsoum

9 May 2015 27	MC Alger	1–1	USM El Harrach	Algiers
17:00	Aouedj 57'	Report	68' Boulakhoua	Stadium: Stade Omar Hammadi; Referee: Amalou, Bounoua, Azrine

16 May 2015 28	CS Constantine	1–1	MC Alger	Constantine
17:00	Boulemdaïs 52'	Report	79' Hachoud	Stadium: Stade Mohamed Hamlaoui; Referee: Arab, Bezine, Hamlaoui

23 May 2015 29	MC Alger	1–0	MC Oran	Algiers
17:00	Gourmi 48' (pen.)	Report		Stadium: Stade Omar Hammadi; Referee: Mial, Idir, Semsoum

29 May 2015 30	RC Arbaâ	2–1	MC Alger	Larbaâ
17:00	Darfalou 48'; Yettou 69'	Report	90+1' Khiter	Stadium: Stade Ismaïl Makhlouf; Referee: Housnia, Seradj, Etchiali

== Algerian Cup ==
13 December 2014 Round of 64	CS Constantine	2–1 (a.e.t.)	MC Alger	Constantine
16:00	Boulemdaïs 23' (pen.); Guerabis 98'		9' (o.g.) Bouba	Stadium: Stade Mohamed Hamlaoui; Referee: Mial, Semsoum, Idir

== CAF Confederation Cup ==
=== Preliminary round ===
14 February 2015 first leg	MC Alger (Algeria)	0–0	(Niger) Sahel SC	Algiers
16:00 UTC+1				Stadium: Stade Omar Hamadi; Referee: Mohamed Abd Elmenem El Hanafy (Egypt)

27 February 2015 Second leg	Sahel SC (Niger)	2–0	(Algeria) MC Alger	Niamey
16:00 UTC+1	Garba 16'; Ibrahim 52'			Stadium: Stade Municipal; Referee: Daniel Nii Ayi Laryea (Ghana)

== Squad information ==
=== Playing statistics ===
No.	Pos	Nat	Player	Total		Ligue 1		Algerian Cup		Confederation Cup		Super Cup	
No.	Pos	Nat	Player	Apps	Goals	Apps	Goals	Apps	Goals	Apps	Goals	Apps	Goals
1	GK	(Algeria) ALG	Faouzi Chaouchi	29	0	26	0	1	0	1	0	1	0
12	GK	(Algeria) ALG	Houari Djemili	4	0	3	0	0	0	1	0	0	0
	GK	(Algeria) ALG	Farid Chaâl	1	0	1	0	0	0	0	0	0	0
3	DF	(Cameroon) CMR	Patrick Ngoula	4	0	3	0	0	0	1	0	0	0
4	DF	(Algeria) ALG	Koceila Berchiche	34	2	30	2	1	0	2	0	1	0
5	DF	(Algeria) ALG	Amine Aksas	15	1	14	1	1	0	0	0	0	0
27	DF	(Algeria) ALG	Abderahmane Hachoud	29	5	25	5	1	0	2	0	1	0
13	DF	(Algeria) ALG	Redouane Bachiri	17	1	15	1	0	0	2	0	0	0
22	DF	(Algeria) ALG	Ayoub Azzi	18	0	16	0	1	0	0	0	1	0
42	DF	(Algeria) ALG	Sofiane Ben Braham	23	1	21	1	0	0	2	0	0	0
	DF	(Algeria) ALG	Mohamed El Hadi Bendoukha	0	0	0	0	0	0	0	0	0	0
	DF	(Algeria) ALG	Mohamed Hikem	0	0	0	0	0	0	0	0	0	0
	DF	(Algeria) ALG	Mohamed Amine Madani	0	0	0	0	0	0	0	0	0	0
	DF	(Algeria) ALG	Toufik Zeghdane	28	1	26	1	1	0	0	0	1	0
26	MF	(Algeria) ALG	Sabri Gharbi	26	0	23	0	1	0	1	0	1	0
11	MF	(Algeria) ALG	Sid Ahmed Aouedj	30	6	26	5	1	0	2	0	1	1
7	MF	(Algeria) ALG	Kaled Gourmi	28	10	25	10	1	0	1	0	1	0
14	MF	(Algeria) ALG	Amir Karaoui	28	0	24	0	1	0	2	0	1	0
10	MF	(Algeria) ALG	Billal Ouali	17	0	16	0	0	0	1	0	0	0
24	MF	(Algeria) ALG	Oussama Chita	15	0	13	0	0	0	2	0	0	0
	MF	(Algeria) ALG	Karim Hendou	23	0	21	0	0	0	1	0	1	0
	MF	(Algeria) ALG	Sofiane Khadir	1	0	1	0	0	0	0	0	0	0
	MF	(Algeria) ALG	Yahya Khiter	9	0	9	0	0	0	0	0	0	0
9	FW	(Cameroon) CMR	Christopher Mendouga	14	1	12	1	0	0	2	0	0	0
17	FW	(Algeria) ALG	Moustapha Djallit	25	3	21	3	1	0	2	0	1	0
77	FW	(Algeria) ALG	Ali Sami Yachir	19	0	16	0	1	0	2	0	0	0
	FW	(Brazil) BRA	Roberson de Arruda Alves	0	0	0	0	0	0	0	0	0	0
Players transferred out during the season
	MF	(Gabon) GAB	Samson Mbingui	11	0	9	0	1	0	0	0	1	0
	MF	(Guinea) GUI	Ibrahim Khalil Sylla	16	3	14	3	1	0	0	0	1	0

Last updated: 28 May 2018
Source: fr.soccerway.com

=== Goalscorers ===
Includes all competitive matches. The list is sorted alphabetically by surname when total goals are equal.

No.	Nat.	Player	Pos.	Ligue 1	Cup	Super Cup	Confederation Cup	TOTAL
7	(Algeria)	Kaled Gourmi	MF	10	0	0	0	10
11	(Algeria)	Sid Ahmed Aouedj	MF	5	0	1	0	6
27	(Algeria)	Abderahmane Hachoud	DF	5	0	0	0	5
-	(Guinea)	Ibrahim Khalil Sylla	FW	3	0	0	0	3
17	(Algeria)	Moustapha Djallit	FW	3	0	0	0	3
4	(Algeria)	Koceila Berchiche	DF	2	0	0	0	2
5	(Algeria)	Amine Aksas	DF	1	0	0	0	1
13	(Algeria)	Redouane Bachiri	DF	1	0	0	0	1
42	(Algeria)	Sofiane Ben Braham	DF	1	0	0	0	1
9	(Cameroon)	Christopher Mendouga	FW	1	0	0	0	1
-	(Algeria)	Toufik Zeghdane	DF	1	0	0	0	1
Own Goals				0	1	0	0	4
Totals				33	1	1	0	35

== Transfers ==
=== In ===
Date	Pos	Player	From club	Transfer fee	Source
4 June 2014	MF	(Algeria) Khaled Gourmi	ES Sétif	Free transfer	radioalgerie.dz
8 June 2014	MF	(Algeria) Karim Hendou	USM El Harrach	Free transfer	lequipedz.com
11 July 2014	MF	(Algeria) Amir Karaoui	ES Sétif	Free transfer	radioalgerie.dz
1 August 2014	MF	(Algeria) Samson Mbingui	(Gabon) Mangasport	Free transfer	linaf.net
2 August 2014	FW	(Guinea) Ibrahim Khalil Sylla	USM El Harrach	Free transfer	djazairess.com
1 January 2015	FW	(Cameroon) Christopher Mendouga	(Cameroon)	Free transfer	lebuteur.com
15 January 2015	FW	(Brazil) Roberson de Arruda Alves	(Brazil) Juventude	20,000 €	2022mag.com

=== Out ===
Date	Pos	Player	To club	Transfer fee	Source
29 December 2014	MF	(Gabon) Samson Mbingui	MC El Eulma	Free transfer	LPDB Officiel
1 January 2015	FW	(Guinea) Ibrahim Khalil Sylla	Unattached	Free transfer	
