= 2015–16 MC Alger season =

MC Alger
2015–16 season
- Chairman: Abdelkrim Raissi
- Head coach: Artur Jorge (until 8 October 2015); Meziane Ighil (from 13 October 2015) (until 6 February 2016); Kamel Amrouche (C) (from 6 February 2016)
- Stadium: Stade Omar Hamadi
- Ligue 1: 12th
- Algerian Cup: Winners
- Top goalscorer: League: Abderahmane Hachoud (6); Kheiredine Merzougi (6); All: Abderahmane Hachoud (8)

In the 2015–16 season, MC Alger competed in the Ligue 1 for the 45th season, as well as the Algerian Cup.

== Squad list ==
Players and squad numbers last updated on 6 August 2009.
Note: Flags indicate national team as has been defined under FIFA eligibility rules. Players may hold more than one non-FIFA nationality.

No.	Name	Nat.	Position	Date of birth (age)	Signed from
Goalkeepers
Defenders
Midfielders
Forwards

== Competitions ==
=== Overview ===
Competition	Record								Started round	Final position / round	First match	Last match
Competition	G	W	D	L	GF	GA	GD	Win %	Started round	Final position / round	First match	Last match
Ligue 1	30	8	14	8	28	26	+2	26.67	—N/a	12th	13 August 2015	27 May 2015
Algerian Cup	6	6	0	0	8	1	+7	100.00	Round of 64	Winners	19 December 2015	1 May 2016
Total	36	14	14	8	36	27	+9	38.89				

== League table ==
Pos	Team	Pld	W	D	L	GF	GA	GD	Pts	Qualification or relegation
10	MC Oran	30	9	13	8	40	35	+5	40 (Note: MC Oran ahead of NA Hussein Dey on head-to-head record: MCO–NAH 1–0, NAH–MCO 1–0.)	
11	NA Hussein Dey	30	10	10	10	31	35	−4	40	Qualification for the Arab Club Championship group stage
12	MC Alger	30	8	14	8	28	26	+2	38	Qualification for the Confederation Cup preliminary round
13	RC Relizane	30	8	12	10	36	35	+1	36 (Note: RC Relizane ahead of USM Blida on head-to-head record: RCR–USB 5–2, USB–RCR 1–0.)	
14	USM Blida (R)	30	7	15	8	20	29	−9	36	Relegation to Ligue Professionnelle 2

Updated to match(es) played on 27 May 2016. Source: DZFoot
Rules for classification: 1) points; 2) head-to-head points; 3) head-to-head goal difference; 4) goal difference; 5) total goals; 6) fairplay ranking; 7) playoff.
(R) Relegated

=== Results summary ===
Overall								Home						Away					
Pld	W	D	L	GF	GA	GD	Pts	W	D	L	GF	GA	GD	W	D	L	GF	GA	GD
30	8	14	8	28	26	+2	38	6	8	1	20	11	+9	2	6	7	8	15	−7

Last updated: 31 January 2015.
Source: Competitive matches

=== Results by round ===
Round	1	2	3	4	5	6	7	8	9	10	11	12	13	14	15	16	17	18	19	20	21	22	23	24	25	26	27	28	29	30
Ground	A	H	A	H	A	H	A	H	A	H	A	H	A	H	A	H	A	H	A	H	A	H	A	H	A	H	A	H	A	H
Result	D	W	D	L	W	W	L	W	L	D	D	W	D	W	D	L	W	L	D	D	D	D	L	D	L	D	D	W	L	D
Position	12	5	7	9	5	3	4	3	3	4	6	5	6	3	3	5	4	4	5	6	6	7	10	8	10	11	12	10	12	12

Updated to match(es) played on 31 January 2015. Source: Competitive matches
A = Away; H = Home; W = Win; D = Draw; L = Loss

=== Matches ===
Win Draw Loss

13 August 2015 Round 1	MC Alger	0–0	CR Belouizdad	Bologhine
18:00		Report; Live TV: TV Tamazight 4 / Algérie 3		Stadium: Stade Omar Hamadi; Referee: Necib, Etchali, Brahim

22 August 2015 Round 2	RC Relizane	1–2	MC Alger	Relizane
18:00	Manucho 75'	Report; Live TV: Algérie 3 / Canal Algérie	6' Gourmi; 64' Hachoud	Stadium: Stade Tahar Zoughari; Referee: Mial, Semsoum, Idir

29 August 2015 Round 3	MC Alger	0–0	JS Saoura	Bologhine
18:00		Report; Live TV: None		Stadium: Stade Omar Hamadi; Attendance: 0 (close doors); Referee: Benouza, Ghomari, Abad

12 September 2015 Round 4	USM Blida	1–0	MC Alger	Blida
18:00	Noubli 62'	Report; Live TV: None		Stadium: Stade Mustapha Tchaker; Attendance: 0 (close doors); Referee: Houasnia, Bouakrinet, Tazrout

17 September 2015 Round 5	MC Alger	2–0	ASM Oran	Bologhine
18:00	Merzougi 32', 71'	Report; Live TV: TV Tamazight 4 / Canal Algérie		Stadium: Stade Omar Hamadi; Referee: Zouaoui, Tamen, Boulfelfel

28 September 2015 Round 6	USM El Harrach	0–1	MC Alger	Algiers
18:00		Report; Live TV: TV Tamazight 4 / beIN Sports / Algérie 3	9' Aouedj	Stadium: Stade 5 Juillet 1962; Referee: Abid Charef, Gourari, Etchaiali

4 October 2015 Round 7	MC Alger	2–3	DRB Tadjenanet	Bologhine
18:00	Merzougui 16'; Bouhenna 53'	Report; Live TV: None	37' Guitoune; 69', 86' Chibane	Stadium: Stade Omar Hamadi; Referee: Bachir, Abed, Brahem

16 October 2015 Round 8	MC Alger	3–1	JS Kabylie	Bologhine
17:00	Merzougi 65' (pen.); Gourmi 79'; Karaoui 88'	Report; Live TV: beIN Sports / Al Kass Sports	33' Diawara	Stadium: Stade Omar Hamadi; Referee: Boukouassa, Hamlaoui, Tazrout

24 October 2015 Round 9	NA Hussein Dey	2–1	MC Alger	Algiers
16:00	Allali 41'; Ouhadda 45'	Report; Live TV: Algérie 3 / Canal Algérie	69' Merzougi	Stadium: Stade 5 Juillet 1962; Referee: Houasnia, Salaouandji, Bourouba

29 October 2015 Round 10	MC Alger	3–3	RC Arbaâ	Algiers
18:00	Abid 21'; Karaoui 56'; Hachoud 66'	Report; Live TV: None	73' Yettou; 82' Guessan; 90' Mahsas	Stadium: Stade 5 Juillet 1962; Referee: Bouzrar, Semsoum, Idir

21 November 2015 Round 12	MC Alger	1–0	MC Oran	Bologhine
16:00	Merzougi 35'	Report; Live TV: Canal Algérie / Al Kass Sports		Stadium: Stade Omar Hamadi; Referee: Arab, Beyout, Hamlaoui

28 November 2015 Round 13	CS Constantine	1–1	MC Alger	Constantine
16:00	Bezzaz 50'	Report; Live TV: Algérie 3	76' Karaoui	Stadium: Stade Mohamed Hamlaoui; Referee: Saïdi, Etchiali, Miraoui

12 December 2015 Round 14	MC Alger	1–0	MO Béjaïa	Bologhine
16:00	Hachoud 77' (pen.)	Report; Live TV: None		Stadium: Stade Omar Hamadi; Referee: Abid Charef, Tamen, Boulfelfel

22 December 2015 Round 11	USM Alger	0–0	MC Alger	Algiers
18:00		Report; Live TV: beIN Sports / Canal Algérie / Al Kass Sports		Stadium: Stade 5 Juillet 1962; Referee: Benouza, Gourari, Omari

26 December 2015 Round 15	ES Sétif	0–0	MC Alger	Sétif
16:00		Report; Live TV: Algérie 3		Stadium: Stade 8 Mai 1945; Referee: Ben Brahem, Brahim, Alaoua

16 January 2016 Round 16	CR Belouizdad	1–0	MC Alger	Belouizdad
15:00	Derrag 88'	Report; Live TV: / Al Kass Sports / Algérie 3		Stadium: Stade 20 Août 1955; Referee: Boukouassa, Bachiri, Bounoua

23 January 2016 Round 17	MC Alger	1–0	RC Relizane	Bologhine
16:00	Abid 32'	Report; Live TV: None		Stadium: Stade Omar Hamadi; Referee: Boukhalfa, Zerhouni, Allaoua

30 January 2016 Round 18	JS Saoura	2–1	MC Alger	Béchar
18:00	Bapidi 24'; Maâziz 52'	Report; Live TV: None	55' Chita	Stadium: Stade 20 Août 1955; Attendance: 0 (close doors); Referee: Bassiri, Hadj Said, Bourchiou

5 February 2016 Round 19	MC Alger	0–0	USM Blida	Bologhine
16:00		Report; Live TV: None		Stadium: Stade Omar Hamadi; Attendance: 0 (close doors); Referee: Bahloul, Bounoua, Saïdi

12 February 2016 Round 20	ASM Oran	0–0	MC Alger	Oran
15:00		Report; Live TV: Canal Algérie		Stadium: Stade Habib Bouakeul; Referee: Achouri, Benhamou, Hamidi

26 February 2016 Round 21	MC Alger	0–0	USM El Harrach	Algiers
16:00		Report; Live TV: None		Stadium: Stade 5 Juillet 1962; Attendance: 0 (close doors); Referee: Ghorbal, Etchiali, Hadj Said

12 March 2016 Round 22	DRB Tadjenanet	0–0	MC Alger	Tadjenanet
15:00		Report; Live TV: Algérie 3		Stadium: Lahoua Smaïl Stadium; Referee: Benouza, Benali, Ayed

19 March 2016 Round 23	JS Kabylie	2–1	MC Alger	Tizi Ouzou
16:00	Diawara 35' (pen.); Mebarki 78'	Report; Live TV: Algérie 3	24' (pen.) Abid	Stadium: Stade 1er Novembre 1954; Referee: Abid-Charef, Gourari, Boulfelfel

1 April 2016 Round 24	MC Alger	0–0	NA Hussein Dey	Algiers
17:00		Report; Live TV: Canal Algérie		Stadium: Stade 5 Juillet 1962; Referee: Arab, Bioud, Hamlaoui

9 April 2016 Round 25	RC Arbaâ	3–1	MC Alger	Larbaâ
16:00	Taib 5'; Yettou 7'; Guessan 63'	Report; Live TV: None	14' Gourmi	Stadium: Stade Ismaïl Makhlouf; Referee: Zouaoui, Kechida, Hakim

22 April 2016 Round 26	MC Alger	2–2	USM Alger	Algiers
17:00	Hachoud 79', 87'	Report; Live TV: beIN Sports / Canal Algérie / Al Kass Sports	26' Nadji; 67' Darfalou	Stadium: Stade 5 Juillet 1962; Referee: Mial, Semsoum, Alaoua

26 April 2016 Round 27	MC Oran	0–0	MC Alger	Oran
17:00		Report; Live TV: beIN Sports / TV Tamazight 4 / Canal Algérie		Stadium: Stade Ahmed Zabana; Referee: Arab, Bioud, Meghlout

13 May 2016 Round 28	MC Alger	3–0	CS Constantine	Bologhine
17:30	Derrardja 21'; Gourmi 44'; Boucherit 90+4'	Report; Live TV: beIN Sports / Al Kass Sports / Algérie 3		Stadium: Stade Omar Hammadi; Referee: Ghorbal, Etchali, Hadj Saïd

20 May 2016 Round 29	MO Béjaïa	2–0	MC Alger	Béjaïa
17:30	Zerdab 50', 67'	Report; Live TV: None		Stadium: Stade de l'Unité Maghrébine; Referee: Zouaoui, Kechida, Halitim

27 May 2016 Round 30	MC Alger	2–2	ES Sétif	Bologhine
17:30	Derrardja 18'; Hachoud 32'	Report; Live TV: None	52' (pen.) Nemdil; 90+1' Mekdache	Stadium: Stade Omar Hammadi; Referee: Mial, Semsoum, Idir

== Algerian Cup ==
17 December 2015 Round of 64	MC Alger	2–0	USM Oran	Belouizdad
17:00	Derrardja 32', 46'	Report		Stadium: Stade 20 Août 1955; Referee: Arab, Bioud, Hamlaoui

8 January 2016 Round of 32	MC Alger	1–0	US Biskra	Bologhine
16:00	Merzougui 40'	Report		Stadium: Stade Omar Hamadi; Attendance: 0 (close doors); Referee: Ghorbal, Zerhouni, Benali

20 February 2016 Round of 16	RC Relizane	1–2	MC Alger	Relizane
15:00	Djerrar 88' (pen.)	Report	Aouedj 18'; Gourmi 78'	Stadium: Stade Tahar Zoughari; Referee: Abid Charef, Boulfelfel, Itchiali

5 March 2016 Quarter-finals	ARB Ghriss	0–2	MC Alger	Mascara
16:00		Report; Live TV: Algérie 3	13' Gourmi; 70' (o.g.) Baghdad	Stadium: Stade de l'Unité Africaine; Referee: Necib, Benaceur, Hamlaoui

16 April 2016 Semi-finals	MC Alger	3–0	US Tébessa	Algiers
16:00	Zeghdane 4'; Abid 25' (pen.); Hachoud 64'	Report; Live TV: Algérie 3 / Al Kass Sports		Stadium: Stade 5 Juillet 1962; Referee: Ghorbal, Itchiali, Hadj Said

1 May 2016 Final	MC Alger	1–0	NA Hussein Dey	Algiers
16:30	Hachoud 81'	Report; Live TV: beIN Sports / Canal Algérie / Al Kass Sports / Algérie 3		Stadium: Stade 5 Juillet 1962; Attendance: 60.000; Referee: Mohamed Benouza

== Squad information ==
=== Playing statistics ===
No.	Pos	Nat	Player	Total		Ligue 1		Algerian Cup	
No.	Pos	Nat	Player	Apps	Goals	Apps	Goals	Apps	Goals
1	GK	(Algeria) ALG	Faouzi Chaouchi	35	0	29	0	6	0
30	GK	(Algeria) ALG	Jonathan Matijas	1	0	1	0	0	0
13	DF	(Algeria) ALG	Redouane Bachiri	18	0	14	0	4	0
16	DF	(Algeria) ALG	Abdelghani Demmou	26	0	24	0	2	0
21	DF	(Algeria) ALG	Toufik Zeghdane	25	1	19	0	6	1
27	DF	(Algeria) ALG	Abderahmane Hachoud	32	8	27	6	5	2
29	DF	(Algeria) ALG	Rachid Bouhenna	25	1	21	1	4	0
42	DF	(Algeria) ALG	Sofiane Ben Braham	21	0	18	0	3	0
46	DF	(Algeria) ALG	Youssef Oudina	4	0	3	0	1	0
22	DF	(Algeria) ALG	Ayoub Azzi	23	0	18	0	5	0
5	MF	(Algeria) ALG	Abdelmalek Mokdad	25	0	20	0	5	0
6	MF	(Algeria) ALG	Mehdi Kacem	25	0	19	0	6	0
8	MF	(Algeria) ALG	Karim Hendou	7	0	6	0	1	0
11	MF	(Algeria) ALG	Yahia Khiter	12	0	11	0	1	0
14	MF	(Algeria) ALG	Amir Karaoui	26	3	21	3	5	0
44	MF	(Algeria) ALG	Oussama Chita	14	1	11	1	3	0
45	MF	(Algeria) ALG	Samir Chaouchi	1	0	1	0	0	0
86	MF	(Algeria) ALG	Mouhamed Amine Bramki	0	0	0	0	0	0
7	MF	(Algeria) ALG	Khaled Gourmi	35	6	29	4	6	2
	MF	(Algeria) ALG	Antar Boucherit	16	1	12	1	4	0
	MF	(Algeria) ALG	Hichem Chérif El Ouazzani	9	0	9	0	0	0
11	FW	(Algeria) ALG	Sid Ahmed Aouedj	34	2	28	1	6	1
17	FW	(Algeria) ALG	Walid Derrardja	26	4	22	2	4	2
18	FW	(Algeria) ALG	Kheiredine Merzougi	17	7	16	6	1	1
91	FW	(Algeria) ALG	Lamine Abid	22	4	19	3	3	1
96	FW	(Algeria) ALG	Koceila Kasdi	0	0	0	0	0	0
	FW	(Algeria) ALG	Mohamed Amachi	1	0	1	0	0	0
Players transferred out during the season
15	DF	(Cameroon) CMR	Patrick Ngoula	3	0	3	0	0	0
25	MF	(Brazil) BRA	Roberson de Arruda Alves	4	0	4	0	0	0
9	FW	(Ethiopia) ETH	Saladin Said	6	0	5	0	1	0

Source: Competitions

== Players ==
As of August 15, 2015

Note: Flags indicate national team as defined under FIFA eligibility rules; some limited exceptions apply. Players may hold more than one non-FIFA nationality.

No.	Pos.	Nation	Player
1	GK	ALG	Faouzi Chaouchi
5	MF	ALG	Abdelmalek Mokdad
6	MF	ALG	Mehdi Kacem
7	FW	ALG	Khaled Gourmi
8	MF	ALG	Karim Hendou
9	FW	ETH	Saladin Said
11	MF	ALG	Yahia Khiter
11	FW	ALG	Sid Ahmed Aouedj
13	DF	ALG	Redouane Bachiri
14	MF	ALG	Amir Karaoui
15	DF	CMR	Patrick Ngoula
16	DF	ALG	Abdelghani Demmou
17	FW	ALG	Walid Derrardja
18	FW	ALG	Kheiredine Merzougi

No.	Pos.	Nation	Player
21	DF	ALG	Toufik Zeghdane
22	MF	ALG	Ayoub Azzi
25	MF	BRA	Roberson (on loan from Juventude)
27	DF	ALG	Abderahmane Hachoud
29	DF	ALG	Rachid Bouhenna
30	GK	ALG	Jonathan Matijas
42	DF	ALG	Sofiane Ben Braham
44	MF	ALG	Oussama Chita
45	MF	ALG	Samir Chaouchi
46	DF	ALG	Youssef Oudina
86	MF	ALG	Mouhamed Amine Bramki
91	FW	ALG	Lamine Abid (on loan from USM El Harrach)
96	FW	ALG	Koceila Kasdi

== Transfers ==
=== In ===
Date	Pos	Player	From club	Transfer fee	Source
2 June 2015	DF	(Algeria) Rachid Bouhenna	CS Constantine	Free transfer	
2 June 2015	MF	(Algeria) Abdelmalek Mokdad	RC Arbaâ	Undisclosed	
8 June 2015	GK	(Algeria) (France) Jonathan Matijas	USM Bel-Abbès	€40,000	
11 June 2015	FW	(Algeria) Kheiredine Merzougi	RC Relizane	Undisclosed	
18 June 2015	DF	(Algeria) Abdelghani Demmou	ES Sétif	Undisclosed	
30 June 2015	MF	(Algeria) Mehdi Kacem	RC Arbaâ	Return from loan	
15 July 2015	FW	(Ethiopia) Saladin Said	(Egypt) Al Ahly SC	Free transfer	
26 July 2015	FW	(Algeria) Lamine Abid	USM El Harrach	Loan one year	
28 July 2015	FW	(Algeria) Walid Derrardja	MC El Eulma	€250,000	
