= 2016 Algerian Cup final =

- Stade du 5 Juillet hosted the match
- Event: 2015–16 Algerian Cup
MC Alger	NA Hussein Dey
1	0
- Date: May 1, 2016
- Venue: Stade 5 Juillet 1962, Algiers
- Man of the Match: Abderahmane Hachoud
- Referee: Mohamed Benouza
- Attendance: 60.000

The 2016 Algerian Cup final was the 52nd final of the Algerian Cup. The final took place on May 1, 2016, at Stade 5 Juillet 1962 in Algiers with kick-off at 16:00.

== Route to the final ==
MC Alger

Round of 64	MC Alger	2 – 0	USM Oran
Round of 32	MC Alger	1 – 0	US Biskra
Round of 16	RC Relizane	1 – 2	MC Alger
Quarter-finals	ARB Ghriss	0 – 1	MC Alger
Semifinals	MC Alger	1 – 0	US Tébessa

NA Hussein Dey

Round of 64	NA Hussein Dey	5 – 0	NRB Bouchegouf
Round of 32	NA Hussein Dey	0 – 0; 4 – 3 (pen.)	JS Saoura
Round of 16	MO Béjaïa	1 – 2 (a.e.t.)	NA Hussein Dey
Quarter-finals	NA Hussein Dey	2 – 0	Paradou AC
Semifinals	NA Hussein Dey	1 – 0	USM Bel-Abbès

== Pre-match ==
=== Details ===
May 1, 2016
16:30

MC Alger	1–0	NA Hussein Dey
Hachoud 81'	Report; Live TV: beIN Sports / Canal Algérie / Al Kass Sports / Algérie 3

Stade 5 Juillet 1962, Algiers
Attendance: 60.000
Referee: Mohamed Benouza

MC Alger	NA Hussein Dey

GK	1	(Algeria) Faouzi Chaouchi
DF	27	(Algeria) Abderahmane Hachoud (c)	(yellow card) 78'
DF	21	(Algeria) Toufik Zeghdane
DF	16	(Algeria) Abdelghani Demmou
DF	13	(Algeria) Redouane Bachiri		(substituted off) 90'
MF	14	(Algeria) Amir Karaoui
MF	6	(Algeria) Mehdi Kacem	(yellow card) 34'
MF	5	(Algeria) Abdelmalek Mokdad
MF	7	(Algeria) Khaled Gourmi
MF	10	(Algeria) Sid Ahmed Aouedj		(substituted off) 86'
FW	17	(Algeria) Walid Derrardja
Substitutes :
MF	23	(Algeria) Antar Boucherit		(substituted on) 86'
DF	29	(Algeria) Rachid Bouhenna		(substituted on) 90'
Manager :
(Algeria) Kamel Amrouche

GK	16	(Algeria) Kheireddine Boussouf
MF	15	(Algeria) Karim Ghazi
MF	22	(Algeria) Billal Ouali
DF	5	(Algeria) Hamza Zeddam
DF	4	(Algeria) Mohamed Herida
MF	8	(Algeria) Sofiane Bendebka (c)
MF	26	(Algeria) Lyès Seddiki	(yellow card) 52'
MF	7	(Algeria) Sofiane Choubani
MF	19	(Algeria) Mehdi Benaldjia		(substituted off) 80'
MF	27	(Algeria) Zakaria Ouhadda
FW	10	(Algeria) Ahmed Gasmi
Substitutes :
MF	29	(Gabon) Samson Mbingui		(substituted on) 80'
Manager :
(Algeria) Youcef Bouzidi

MATCH OFFICIALS

- Assistant referees:
  - Abdelhak Etchiali
  - Mokrane Gourari
- Fourth official:
  - Farouk Houasnia
