= 2017–18 USM Alger season =

USM Alger
2017–18 season
- Owner: Ali Haddad
- Chairman: Rabouh Haddad (until 28 February 2018); Abdelhakim Serrar (from 28 February 2018)
- Head coach: Paul Put (until 11 November 2017); Miloud Hamdi (from 12 November 2017)
- Stadium: Omar Hamadi Stadium; Stade du 5 Juillet
- Ligue 1: 6th
- Algerian Cup: Round of 16
- Champions League: Semi-finals
- Confederation Cup: Group stage
- Top goalscorer: League: Oussama Darfalou (18 goals); All: Oussama Darfalou (26 goals)

In the 2017–18 season, USM Alger competed in the Ligue 1 for the 40th season, as well as the CAF Champions League, and the Algerian Cup. It was their 23rd consecutive season in the top flight of Algerian football.

With the start of the season, the team failed to achieve their biggest goal of winning the CAF Champions League after defeating against Morocco's Wydad. On 11 November 2017 the coach Paul Put announced his resignation following a 2-1 defeat to CS Constantine. A day after Put's departure, the club hired Franco Algerien coach Miloud Hamdi until the end of the season.

== Season summary ==
In preparation for this season, which will start at the end of August 2017, the management of the USMA, in consultation with the technical staff, is planning the summer training course from 04 to 16 August 2017 in Turkey the Usmists will be in Istanbul at 2 pm, a bus will wait for the Algerian delegation to transport it to the station Kartepe in Izmit and will play five friendly matches. three against local clubs, two against Saudi clubs and one against a Qatari club. USM Alger is transported without six players: Ayoub Abdellaoui, Abderrahmane Meziane, Oussama Darfalou, Okacha Hamzaoui and Raouf Benguit Who joined the Algeria A' national team in preparation for the African Nations Championship qualification against the Libyan national team, as for Soumaila Sidibe did not move with the team because of the visa. the first friendly against Mersin İdmanyurdu and ended with a 5–1 victory and only Ziri Hammar played 90 minutes, and he was the author of three assists, in the same context the games it was delayed for a day due to heavy fog. The second match was against Al Kharaitiyat Qatar and ended 4–1 in favor of the Union and saw the match with the young striker Boumechra, who scored two goals The third game against Sultanbeyli Belediyespor canceled because of the fog and to avoid these problems the decision of the management of the USM Alger played the rest of the friendly games in another place to avoid being postponed, then in the fourth game against Al-Hazm Saudi Club won the Union winning two goals to zero, on the final day of training, the team played two friendly matches in the morning against Ataşehir Çamolukspor and ended in favor of USM Alger with a 2–0 victory. In the evening against Al-Orobah from Saudi Arabia, they ended with a 2–2 draw. after a 13-day internship in Turkey in the heights of Izmit, the Red and Black are back home. The plane from Istanbul arrived at the Algiers airport at 18:30.

== Squad list ==
Players and squad numbers last updated on 19 May 2018.
Note: Flags indicate national team as has been defined under FIFA eligibility rules. Players may hold more than one non-FIFA nationality.

No.	Name	Nat.	Position	Date of birth (age)	Signed from	Apps.	Goals	Signed in	Contract ends
Goalkeepers
1	Lamine Zemmamouche (C.)	(Algeria)	GK	19 March 1985 (aged 32)	(Algeria) MC Alger	334	1	2012	2020
16	Ismaïl Mansouri	(Algeria)	GK	7 January 1988 (aged 29)	(Algeria) MO Béjaïa	53	0	2008	2019
30	Mourad Berrefane	(Algeria)	GK	18 March 1986 (aged 31)	(Algeria) MO Béjaïa	23	0	2014	2018
Defenders
3	Ayoub Abdellaoui	(Algeria)	LB / CB	16 February 1993 (aged 24)	(Algeria) Reserve team	94	3	2011	2016
5	Mohamed Benyahia	(Algeria)	CB / DM	30 June 1992 (aged 25)	(Algeria) MC Oran	50	5	2016	2019
6	Farouk Chafaï	(Algeria)	CB	23 June 1990 (aged 27)	(Algeria) Reserve team	227	22	2010	2019
20	Nacereddine Khoualed	(Algeria)	CB	16 April 1986 (aged 31)	(Algeria) US Biskra	289	10	2006	2018
25	Mokhtar Benmoussa	(Algeria)	LB / LM / LW	1 August 1986 (aged 31)	(Algeria) ES Sétif	208	14	2012	2019
22	Mohamed Rabie Meftah (V.C.)	(Algeria)	RB	5 May 1985 (aged 32)	(Algeria) JSM Béjaïa	206	38	2011	2020
21	Mehdi Benchikhoune	(Algeria)	RB	3 April 1996 (aged 21)	(Algeria) Reserve team	6	0	2017	2022
19	Redouane Cherifi	(Algeria)	DF	22 February 1993 (aged 24)	(Algeria) USM Bel-Abbès	21	0	2017	2021
27	Raouf Benguit	(Algeria)	CB / DM	5 April 1996 (aged 20)	(Algeria) Paradou AC	62	1	2016	2018
Midfielders
15	Oualid Ardji	(Algeria)	MF	7 September 1995 (aged 21)	(Algeria) NA Hussein Dey	13	1	2016	2021
20	Rafik Bouderbal	(Algeria)	AM / FW	19 September 1987 (aged 29)	(France) AS Lyon-Duchère	24	1	2016	2018
4	Soumaila Sidibe	(Mali)	AM / DM	15 June 1992 (aged 25)	(Algeria) MO Béjaïa	8	0	2017	2020
8	Kaddour Beldjilali	(Algeria)	AM / CM	28 November 1988 (aged 29)	(Tunisia) Étoile du Sahel	82	6	2014	2017
18	Amir Sayoud	(Algeria)	AM	30 September 1990 (aged 27)	(Algeria) DRB Tadjenanet	45	5	2016	2020
10	Ziri Hammar	(Algeria)	AM	25 July 1992 (aged 25)	(Algeria) JS Saoura	24	3	2016	2020
14	Faouzi Bourenane	(Algeria)	AM	24 August 1994 (aged 23)	(Czech Republic) Příbram	15	1	2016	2020
17	Mohamed Benkablia	(Algeria)	AM	2 February 1993 (aged 24)	(Algeria) JS Kabylie	17	0	2016	2019
23	Hamza Koudri	(Algeria)	DM	15 December 1987 (aged 30)	(Algeria) MC Alger	184	5	2012	2020
24	Mohammed Benkhemassa	(Algeria)	AM / DM	28 June 1993 (aged 24)	(Algeria) Reserve team	104	4	2011	2018
26	Reda Bellahcene	(Algeria)	DM	21 January 1993 (aged 24)	(France) FC Saint-Louis Neuweg	23	1	2016	2019
31	Ilyes Yaiche	(Algeria)	AM / LM	27 October 1997 (aged 20)	(Algeria) Reserve team	16	0	2016	2020
7	Faouzi Yaya	(Algeria)	MF	21 September 1989 (aged 28)	(Algeria) MO Béjaïa	27	4	2017	2020
2	Oussama Chita	(Algeria)	MF	31 October 1996 (aged 21)	(Algeria) MC Alger	22	0	2017	2021
Forwards
11	Abderrahmane Meziane	(Algeria)	ST	7 March 1994 (aged 23)	(Algeria) RC Arbaâ	74	13	2014	2021
13	Oussama Darfalou	(Algeria)	ST / FW	29 September 1993 (aged 24)	(Algeria) RC Arbaâ	79	40	2015	2018
9	Okacha Hamzaoui	(Algeria)	FW	12 November 1990 (aged 27)	(Portugal) Nacional	16	2	2017	2018
10	Reda Hajhouj	(Morocco)	FW	2 July 1994 (aged 23)	(Morocco) Wydad Casablanca	10	2	2018	2019
17	Mohamed Amine Hamia	(Algeria)	FW	5 October 1989 (aged 28)	(Algeria) CR Belouizdad	5	0	2018	2021

== Transfers ==
=== In ===
Date	Pos	Player	From club	Transfer fee	Source
21 May 2017	CF	(Algeria) Okacha Hamzaoui	(Portugal) Nacional	Loan one year	
21 June 2017	AM	(Algeria) Faouzi Yaya	(Algeria) MO Béjaïa	Free transfer	
22 June 2017	DF	(Algeria) Redouane Cherifi	(Algeria) USM Bel-Abbès	Free transfer	
30 June 2017	FW	(Ivory Coast) Manucho	(Algeria) CS Constantine	Loan Return	
30 June 2017	CB	(Algeria) Mohamed Amine Madani	(Algeria) USM El Harrach	Loan Return	
4 July 2017	MF	(Algeria) Oussama Chita	(Algeria) MC Alger	Free transfer	
4 July 2017	CB / DM	(Algeria) Raouf Benguit	(Algeria) Paradou AC	Loan one year	
11 July 2017	DF	(Algeria) Mehdi Benchikhoune	Reserve team	First Professional Contract	
31 July 2017	MF	(Mali) Soumaila Sidibe	(Algeria) MO Béjaïa	7,000,000 DA	
23 December 2017	MF	(Algeria) Oualid Ardji	(Algeria) NA Hussein Dey	Loan Return	
23 December 2017	MF	(Algeria) (France) Rafik Bouderbal	N/A	Return to complete his contract	
14 January 2018	FW	(Morocco) Reda Hajhouj	(Morocco) Wydad Casablanca	Free transfer	
15 January 2018	FW	(Algeria) Mohamed Amine Hamia	(Algeria) CR Belouizdad	Free transfer (Released)	

=== Out ===
Date	Pos	Player	To club	Transfer fee	Source
29 June 2017	RB	(Algeria) Toufik Zeghdane	(France) Sedan Ardennes	Free transfer (Released)	
30 June 2017	CB	(Algeria) Raouf Benguit	(Algeria) Paradou AC	Return from loan	
30 June 2017	AM / FW	(France) (Algeria) Rafik Bouderbal	Unattached	Undisclosed	
30 June 2017	FW	(France) (Ivory Coast) Ghislain Guessan	(Algeria) RC Arbaâ	End of his contract	
30 June 2017	FW	(Ivory Coast) Manucho	(Egypt) Al Ittihad Alexandria	End of contract	
30 June 2017	CF	(Madagascar) Carolus Andriamatsinoro	(Saudi Arabia) Ohod Club	End of contract	
14 July 2017	AM	(France) (Algeria) Abel Khaled	(Algeria) DRB Tadjenanet	Free transfer (Released)	
16 July 2017	DF	(Algeria) Abderrahim Hamra	(Algeria) DRB Tadjenanet	Loan	
16 July 2017	FW	(Algeria) Kaddour Cherif	(Algeria) DRB Tadjenanet	Loan	
28 July 2017	MF	(Algeria) Mustapha Bengrina	(Algeria) US Biskra	Loan	
28 July 2017	MF	(Algeria) Ibrahim Farhi	(Algeria) US Biskra	Loan	
30 July 2017	CB	(Algeria) Mohamed Amine Madani	(Algeria) JS Saoura	20,000,000 DA	
11 December 2017	CB	(Algeria) Nacereddine Khoualed	(Saudi Arabia) Ohod Club	Free transfer (Released)	(Note: Nacereddine Khoualed joined Ohod Club following his release.)
28 December 2017	AM	(Algeria) Ziri Hammar	(Algeria) JS Kabylie	Loan for six months	
8 January 2018	AM	(Algeria) Mohamed Benkablia	(Algeria) CR Belouizdad	Undisclosed	
11 January 2018	AM	(Algeria) Faouzi Bourenane	(Algeria) CR Belouizdad	Free transfer (Released)	
15 January 2018	AM/DM	(Mali) Soumaila Sidibe	(Algeria) CR Belouizdad	Loan for six months	

== Pre-season and friendlies ==
8 August 2017 (Note: The match was abandoned due to heavy fog after 10 minutes from the start of the match, and was resumed on 9 August 2017, 11:00, from the point of abandonment.) Friendly	Mersin İdmanyurdu (Turkey)	1-5	(Algeria) USM Alger	Izmit
16:00 UTC+3		Report	(?) Benkablia (?) Ben Hamouda (?) Cherifi (?) Boumechra (?) Bourenane	Stadium: ? Attendance: 0 Referee: ?

11 August 2017 Friendly	Al Kharaitiyat (Qatar)	1-4	(Algeria) USM Alger	Izmit
16:30 UTC+3		Report	(?) Chafaï (?) Boumechra (?) Benyahia	Stadium: ? Attendance: 0 Referee: ?

14 August 2017 Friendly	Sultanbeyli Belediyespor (Turkey)	Canceled	(Algeria) USM Alger	Izmit
16:00 UTC+3		[ Report]		Stadium: ?

15 August 2017 Friendly	USM Alger (Algeria)	2-0	(Saudi Arabia) Al-Hazm	Izmit
00:00 UTC+3	Sayoud (?); Yaya (?)	Report		Stadium: ? Attendance: 0 Referee: ?

16 August 2017 Friendly	Ataşehir Çamolukspor (Turkey)	0-2	(Algeria) USM Alger	Izmit
10:00 UTC+3		Report	(?) Boukhena (?) Benmoussa	Stadium: ? Attendance: 0 Referee: ?

16 August 2017 Friendly	USM Alger (Algeria)	2-2	(Saudi Arabia) Al-Orobah	Izmit
15:30 UTC+3	Benyahia (?); Benkablia (?)	Report		Stadium: ? Attendance: 0 Referee: ?

20 August 2017 Friendly	USM Alger	3-2	Olympique de Médéa	Bologhine
18:00	Meftah (?); Meziane (?)	Report		Stadium: Omar Hamadi Stadium; Attendance: 3,000; Referee: ?

30 August 2017 Friendly	USM Alger	3-0	RC Kouba	Bologhine
10:00	Hamzaoui (?); Hammar (?)	Report		Stadium: Omar Hamadi Stadium; Attendance: 100; Referee: ?

23 March 2018 Friendly	USM Alger	4-3	Paradou AC	Bologhine
18:00	Yaya 27', 32'; Hamzaoui 40'; Hamia 76'	[ Report] Live TV: Dzaïr TV	13', 37' Loucif; 55' ?	Stadium: Omar Hamadi Stadium; Referee: ?

== Competitions ==
=== Overview ===
Competition	Record								Started round	Final position / round	First match	Last match
Competition	G	W	D	L	GF	GA	GD	Win %	Started round	Final position / round	First match	Last match
Ligue 1	30	11	9	10	43	32	+11	36.67	—N/a	6th	26 August 2017	19 May 2018
Algerian Cup	3	2	0	1	2	1	+1	66.67	Round of 64	Round of 16	29 December 2017	2 February 2018
Champions League	5	1	3	1	6	5	+1	20.00	Group stage	Semi-finals	9 July 2017	21 October 2017
Confederation Cup	6	2	3	1	12	5	+7	33.33	First round	Group stage (Note: The competition will be completed in the new season 2018–19 starting from the third round.)	7 March 2018	16 May 2018
Total	44	16	15	13	63	43	+20	36.36				

Updated to match played 19 May 2018
Source: Competitions

=== Ligue 1 ===
==== League table ====
Pos	Team	Pld	W	D	L	GF	GA	GD	Pts	Qualification or relegation
4	MC Oran	30	12	9	9	40	37	+3	45	
5	MC Alger	30	12	8	10	41	32	+9	44	Qualification for 2018–19 Arab Club Champions Cup
6	USM Alger	30	11	9	10	43	35	+8	42 (Note: Ranked on head-to-head results.)	Qualification for 2018–19 Arab Club Champions Cup
7	Paradou AC	30	12	6	12	35	30	+5	42	
8	ES Sétif	30	10	10	10	35	30	+5	40	Qualification for 2018–19 Arab Club Champions Cup

Updated to match(es) played on 19 May 2018. Source: DZFoot
Rules for classification: 1) points; 2) head-to-head points; 3) head-to-head goal difference; 4) goal difference; 5) total goals; 6) fairplay ranking; 7) playoff.

==== Results summary ====
Overall								Home						Away					
Pld	W	D	L	GF	GA	GD	Pts	W	D	L	GF	GA	GD	W	D	L	GF	GA	GD
30	13	9	8	43	35	+8	48	6	4	5	24	18	+6	7	5	3	19	17	+2

Last updated: 19 May 2018.
Source: Competitive matches

==== Results by round ====
Round	1	2	3	4	5	6	7	8	9	10	11	12	13	14	15	16	17	18	19	20	21	22	23	24	25	26	27	28	29	30
Ground	H	A	H	A	H	A	H	A	H	A	H	H	A	H	A	A	H	A	H	A	H	A	H	A	H	A	A	H	A	H
Result	W	D	D	L	W	W	W	W	W	D	L	L	D	D	W	D	L	W	L	D	D	W	W	L	D	L	L	W	L	L
Position	4	4	6	12	7	6	2	1	1	1	2	3	3	4	3	3	5	2	4	4	4	4	3	5	5	6	6	5	5	6

Source: Competitive matches
A = Away; H = Home; W = Win; D = Draw; L = Loss

==== Matches ====
Win Draw Loss

26 August 2017 Round 1	USM Alger	2–1	Paradou AC	Bologhine
19:00	Hamzaoui 46'; Meftah 80' (pen.)	Soccerway report LFP report Live TV: None	28' Naidji; (yellow card) 79' Moussaoui	Stadium: Omar Hamadi Stadium; Referee: Mustapha Ghorbal; Man of the Match: Meftah

7 September 2017 Round 2	NA Hussein Dey	1–1	USM Alger	Belouizdad
17:00	Laribi (yellow card) 17'; Gasmi 49' (pen.) (yellow card) 90+4'; Khacef (yellow card) 71'	Soccerway report LFP report Live TV: Canal Algérie	(yellow card) 47' Zemmamouche; 74' Meziane	Stadium: August 20, 1955 Stadium; Referee: Abderrezzak Arab; Man of the Match: Harrag

11 September 2017 Round 3	USM Alger	1–1	DRB Tadjenanet	Bologhine
17:45	Darfalou 79'; Benkhemassa (yellow card) 90+2'	Soccerway report LFP report Live TV: TV Tamazight 4	17' Attouche; (yellow card) 20' Demane; (yellow card) 42' Maroci; (yellow card) 63' Boufeneche; (yellow card) 84' Hadded	Stadium: Omar Hamadi Stadium; Referee: Lahlou Benbraham

3 October 2017 Round 4	USM Bel-Abbès	2–0	USM Alger	Sidi Bel Abbès
17:00	Bounoua 21'; Lamara (yellow card) 31'; Belhocini (yellow card) 35' (goal) 45+1'; Toual (yellow card) 45'	Soccerway report LFP report Live TV: EPTV Terrestre / Canal Algérie	(yellow card) 10' Benkhemassa	Stadium: Stade 24 Fevrier 1956; Attendance: 30,000; Referee: Said Aouina

24 October 2017 Round 5	USM Alger	2–0	USM El Harrach	Bologhine
17:00	Darfalou 2'; Benkhemassa (yellow card) 70'; Hammar 87'	Soccerway report LFP report Live TV: Canal Algérie	(yellow card) 49' Delhoum; (yellow card) 53' Mebarki; (yellow card) 67' Khelili	Stadium: Omar Hamadi Stadium; Referee: Nabil Boukhalfa

28 October 2017 Round 9	USM Alger	4–0	CR Belouizdad	Bologhine
17:00	Benmoussa 7'; Hammar 13' (pen.) (yellow card) 34'; Darfalou 23' (pen.), 40'; Abdellaoui (yellow card) 55'; Benkhemassa (yellow card) 61'; Chafaï (yellow card) 76'	Soccerway report LFP report Live TV: Canal Algérie / TV Tamazight 4	(yellow card) 31' Khoudi; (yellow card) 37' Namani	Stadium: Omar Hamadi Stadium; Referee: Lotfi Bekouassa

3 November 2017 Round 10	Olympique de Médéa	1–1	USM Alger	Médéa
15:00	Bouchiba (yellow card) 34'; Baouche 55' (yellow card) 83'	Soccerway report LFP report Live TV: None	(yellow card) 80' Koudri; 89' Darfalou	Stadium: Stade Imam Lyes de Médéa; Referee: Mohamed Saïdi

11 November 2017 Round 11	USM Alger	1–2	CS Constantine	Bologhine
17:00	Yaya 11'; Benyahia (yellow card) 26'	Soccerway report LFP report Live TV: Algérie 3	57' Abid; 74' Dahar; (yellow card) 90' Belkheir	Stadium: Omar Hamadi Stadium; Referee: Mustapha Ghorbal

16 November 2017 Round 12	USM Alger	0–2	JS Saoura	Bologhine
17:00	Meziane (yellow card) 79'; Meftah (yellow card) 90'	Soccerway report LFP report Live TV: None	(yellow card) 6' Merbah; (yellow card) 39' Djallit; 45' Bekakchi; (yellow card) 64' Bousmaha; (yellow card) 77' Boukacem; (yellow card) 79' Benkouider; 90+3' Yahia-Chérif; (yellow card) 90+3' Bourdim	Stadium: Omar Hamadi Stadium; Attendance: 0 (close doors); Referee: Said Aouina

28 November 2017 Round 6	MC Alger	0–2	USM Alger	Algiers
17:45	Karaoui (yellow card) 50'; Boudebouda (yellow card) 81'; El Moudene (yellow card) 90+3'	Soccerway report LFP report Live TV: Al-Kass Sports / Algérie 3 / TV Tamazight 4	(yellow card) 40' Koudri; 56' (pen.) Benmoussa; (yellow card) 58' Benguit; (yellow card) 71' Benkhemassa; (yellow card) 81' Beldjilali; 84' Darfalou	Stadium: Stade du 5 Juillet; Referee: Lotfi Bekouassa; Man of the Match: Benguit

2 December 2017 Round 13	MC Oran	1–1	USM Alger	Oran
16:00	Ferrahi (yellow card) 48'; Toumi 80'	Soccerway report LFP report Live TV: None	(yellow card) 51' Benkhemassa; (yellow card) 71' Sidibe; 75' Darfalou	Stadium: Ahmed Zabana Stadium; Referee: Abderrezzak Arab

5 December 2017 Round 7	USM Alger	2–0	US Biskra	Bologhine
17:00	Cherifi (yellow card) 12'; Darfalou 16'; Khoualed (yellow card) 58'; Boumechra 74'	Soccerway report LFP report Live TV: None		Stadium: Omar Hamadi Stadium; Attendance: 0 (close doors); Referee: Farouk Mial

8 December 2017 Round 14	USM Alger	0–0	JS Kabylie	Bologhine
17:00	Benkhemassa (yellow card) 28'; Meftah (yellow card) 47'; Benguit (yellow card) 64' (yellow-red card) 80'	Soccerway report LFP report Live TV: TV Tamazight 4	(yellow card) 68' Yettou; (yellow card) 84' (yellow-red card) 90+3' Ferhani; (yellow card) 88' Asselah	Stadium: Omar Hamadi Stadium; Referee: Mohamed Saïdi

12 December 2017 Round 8	ES Sétif	1–2	USM Alger	Sétif
17:00	Obambou (yellow card) 27'; Benayad 54'	Soccerway report LFP report Live TV: Canal Algérie / TV Tamazight 4	5' Darfalou; (yellow card) 9' Benkhemassa; (yellow card) 15' (yellow-red card) 43' Abdellaoui; 75' Chafaï	Stadium: Stade 8 Mai 1945; Referee: Mehdi Abid Charef

16 December 2017 Round 15	USM Blida	2–3	USM Alger	Blida
15:00	Guattal 47'; Ghacha (yellow card) 53'; Frioui 55'	Soccerway report LFP report Live TV: None	10' Meziane; 58' Darfalou; 78' Chafaï	Stadium: Brakni Brothers Stadium; Referee: Boubekeur Zouaoui

6 January 2018 Round 16	Paradou AC	0–0	USM Alger	Bologhine
17:00	Chahrour (yellow card) 31'; Cheraitia (yellow card) 47'; Naidji (yellow card) 53'	Soccerway report LFP report Live TV: TV Tamazight 4	(yellow card) 1' Zemmamouche; (yellow card) 17' Abdellaoui; (yellow card) 44' Benguit; (yellow card) 90+3' Meftah	Stadium: Omar Hamadi Stadium; Referee: Lotfi Bekouassa

20 January 2018 Round 17	USM Alger	1–2	NA Hussein Dey	Algiers
16:00	Benkhemassa (yellow card) 33'; Abdellaoui (yellow card) 47'; Chafaï (yellow card) 77'; Benyahia 90+3' (pen.)	Soccerway report LFP report Live TV: Canal Algérie	10' Addadi; (yellow card) 81' Laribi; (yellow card) 85' Khiat; 89' Ouadji	Stadium: Stade du 5 Juillet; Referee: Abderrezzak Arab

27 January 2018 Round 18	DRB Tadjenanet	0–3	USM Alger	Tadjenanet
15:00	Fourloul (yellow card) 80'	Soccerway report LFP report Live TV: Algérie 3	23', 38' Yaya; 26' Darfalou; (yellow card) 36' Meftah	Stadium: Lahoua Smaïl Stadium; Referee: Mohamed Saïdi

9 February 2018 Round 19	USM Alger	1–2	USM Bel-Abbès	Algiers
17:00	Hajhouj 14'; Zemmamouche (yellow card) 47'; Chafaï (yellow card) 72'; Benkhemassa (yellow card) 89'	Soccerway report LFP report Live TV: EPTV Terrestre / TV Tamazight 4	(yellow card) 28' Salah; (yellow card) 47' Lagraâ; (yellow card) 71' Lamara; 75' Seguer; 85' Tabti	Stadium: Stade du 5 Juillet; Referee: Boubekeur Zouaoui

16 February 2018 Round 20	USM El Harrach	0–0	USM Alger	Algiers
16:00	Daoud (yellow card) 42' (yellow-red card) 60'	Soccerway report Live TV: None	(yellow card) 42' Koudri	Stadium: Stade 1er Novembre 1954; Referee: Abderrezzak Arab

24 February 2018 Round 21	USM Alger	2–2	MC Alger	Algiers
17:00	Darfalou 1' (yellow card) 43'; Abdellaoui (yellow card) 17'; Bouderbal 19'; Benmoussa (yellow card) 22'; Chafaï (yellow card) 68'; Bellahcene (yellow card) 79'; Meftah (yellow card) 82'; Zemmamouche (yellow card) 90+2'	Soccerway report LFP report Live TV: Al-Kass Sports / Algérie 3 / Canal Algérie	(yellow card) 12' Nekkache; 56' Bendebka; 71' Hachoud	Stadium: Stade du 5 Juillet; Referee: Lotfi Bekouassa

2 March 2018 Round 22	US Biskra	0–1	USM Alger	Biskra
16:00	Maanser (yellow card) 37'	Soccerway report LFP report Live TV: None	64' Benkhemassa	Stadium: El Alia Sports Complex; Referee: Mohamed Saïdi

13 March 2018 Round 23	USM Alger	3–2	ES Sétif	Bologhine
17:00	Darfalou 8' (pen.); Benguit (yellow card) 49' (yellow-red card) 56'; Koudri 50' (yellow card) 53'; Chafaï 82'	Soccerway report LFP report Live TV: EPTV Terrestre / Canal Algérie	(yellow card) 49' Sidhoum; 83', 90+2' Banouh	Stadium: Omar Hamadi Stadium; Referee: Mehdi Abid Charef

30 March 2018 Round 24	CR Belouizdad	1–0	USM Alger	Belouizdad
15:00	Salhi (yellow card) 26'; Bellaili 35' (pen.); Draoui (yellow card) 72'; Lakroum (yellow card) 89'	Soccerway report LFP report Live TV: Algérie 3	(yellow card) 80' Chafaï; (yellow card) 89' Benkhemassa	Stadium: Stade 20 Août 1955; Referee: Farouk Mial

13 April 2018 Round 25	USM Alger	1–1	Olympique de Médéa	Bologhine
16:00	Abdellaoui 38'	Soccerway report LFP report Live TV: None	12' Benamar; (yellow card) 60' Boucherit; (yellow card) 83' Morcely	Stadium: Omar Hamadi Stadium; Attendance: 0 (close doors); Referee: Missoum Benabdellah

20 April 2018 Round 26	CS Constantine	2–1	USM Alger	Constantine
16:00	Arroussi (yellow card) 38'; Cherifi 53' (o.g.); Belameiri (yellow card) 18' (goal) 90+4'	Soccerway report LFP report Live TV: Algérie 3	(red card) 40' Abdellaoui; (yellow card) 38' Chafaï; (yellow card) 45+2' Benkhemassa; 51' Darfalou; (yellow card) 74' Meftah; (red card) 88' Benguit; (yellow card) 90+5' Zemmamouche	Stadium: Stade Mohamed Hamlaoui; Referee: Ahmed Bouzrar

24 April 2018 Round 27	JS Saoura	3–2	USM Alger	Béchar
16:00	Bourdim 21', 81' (pen.); Cherifi 53' (o.g.)	Soccerway report LFP report Live TV: None	58' (o.g.) Konaté; 90+1' (pen.) Benmoussa	Stadium: Stade 20 Août 1955; Attendance: 0 (close doors); Referee: Mohamed Saïdi

28 April 2018 Round 28	USM Alger	3–1	MC Oran	Bologhine
16:00	Darfalou 65' (pen.), 69' (pen.); Benyahia 83'	Soccerway report LFP report Live TV: Canal Algérie	6' Chibane; (yellow card) 38' Mekkaoui; (yellow card) 63' Abdat	Stadium: Omar Hamadi Stadium; Referee: Lahlou Benbraham

11 May 2018 Round 29	JS Kabylie	3–2	USM Alger	Tizi Ouzou
16:00	Yettou 20'; Benyahia 64' (o.g.); Radouani 73'	Soccerway report Live TV: None	80', 89' Darfalou	Stadium: November 1, 1954 Stadium; Attendance: 0 (close doors); Referee: Farouk Mial

19 May 2018 Round 30	USM Alger	1–2	USM Blida	Bologhine
16:00	Hajhouj 64'	Soccerway report Live TV: None	53' Dadsi; 83' Frioui	Stadium: Omar Hamadi Stadium; Referee: Ali Nader

=== Algerian Cup ===
29 December 2017 Round of 64	USM Alger	1–0	US Firme	Bologhine
16:00	Meftah 45+2'; Sidibe (yellow card) 77'	USM Alger report Live TV: None		Stadium: Omar Hamadi Stadium; Referee: Ahmed Bouzrar
Note: Lineup for USM Alger - Zemmamouche, Benyahia (Bourenane 84’), Cherifi, Meftah, Sidibe, Chita, Sayoud, Koudri, Bellahcene, Yaya (Yaiche 46’), Meziane

16 January 2018 Round of 32	USM Alger	1–0	CS Constantine	Bologhine
16:00	Benguit (yellow card) 32'; Sayoud 60'; Mansouri (red card) 90+2'	dzFoot report Live TV: EPTV Terrestre / Canal Algérie		Stadium: Omar Hamadi Stadium; Referee: Farouk Mial
Note: Lineup for USM Alger - Mansouri, Benyahia, Chafai, Abdellaoui, Benmoussa, Koudri, Benkhemassa, Benguit, Sayoud (Chita 70’), Darfalou (Berrefane 90+2’), Yaya (Ardji 76’)

2 February 2018 Round of 16	JS Saoura	1–0	USM Alger	Béchar
17:00	Madani (yellow card) 79'; Yahia-Chérif 81' (yellow card) 82'; Boukacem (yellow card) 90'	Report; Live TV: EPTV Terrestre / TV Tamazight 4	(yellow card) 59' Meftah; (yellow card) 67' Benguit; (yellow card) 75' Yaya	Stadium: Stade 20 Août 1955; Referee: Farouk Mial
Note: Lineup for USM Alger - Zemmamouche, Meftah, Chafai, Abdellaoui, Benmoussa (Hamia 88'), Chita, Benguit (Sayoud 86'), Benkhemassa, Hajhouj (Meziane 80'), Derfalou, Yaya

=== Champions League ===
==== knockout stage ====
===== Quarter-finals =====
16 September 2017 First leg	Ferroviário Beira (Mozambique)	1–1	(Algeria) USM Alger	Beira
15:00 UTC+2	Agy (yellow card) 19'; Kanda 89'	Report	(yellow card) 4' Abdellaoui; 63' Darfalou; (yellow card) 84' Zemmamouche	Stadium: Estádio do Chiveve; Attendance: 6,000; Referee: Hamada Nampiandraza (Madagascar)

23 September 2017 Second leg	USM Alger (Algeria)	0–0 (1 (a) –1 agg.)	(Mozambique) Ferroviário Beira	Algiers
18:30 UTC+1		Report	(yellow card) 29' Nyirenda; (yellow card) 81' Maninho	Stadium: Stade du 5 Juillet; Attendance: 35,000; Referee: Bakary Gassama (Gambia)

===== Semi-finals =====
29 September 2017 First leg	USM Alger (Algeria)	0–0	(Morocco) Wydad Casablanca	Algiers
18:00 UTC+1	Meftah (yellow card) 38'; Benmoussa (yellow card) 47'; Chafaï (yellow card) 89'	Report	(yellow card) 14' Gaddarine; (yellow card) 89' Khadrouf	Stadium: Stade du 5 Juillet; Attendance: 65,000; Referee: Sidi Alioum (Cameroon)

21 October 2017 Second leg	Wydad Casablanca (Morocco)	3–1 (3–1 agg.)	(Algeria) USM Alger	Casablanca
20:00 UTC+1	El Karti 26'; Bencharki 54', 90+3'; Nekkach (yellow card) 57'; Atouchi (yellow card) 47' (yellow-red card) 56'	Report	(yellow card) 53' (goal) 67' Abdellaoui; (yellow card) 58' Darfalou	Stadium: Stade Mohammed V Attendance: 60,000; Referee: Malang Diedhiou (Senegal)

=== Confederation Cup ===
==== Qualifying rounds ====
===== First round =====
7 March 2018 first leg	AS Maniema Union (Democratic Republic of the Congo)	2–2	(Algeria) USM Alger	Kindu
14:00 UTC+2	Mbuka 45'; Mozinzi 51'	Report	18' Ardji; 29' Darfalou	Stadium: Stade Joseph Kabila; Attendance: 5,000; Referee: Sabri Mohamed Fadul (Sudan)
Note: Lineup for USM Alger - Zemmamouche - Abdellaoui, Chafaï, Cherifi, Benchikhoun (Benkhemassa 78’) - Benguit, Koudri, Bellahcene (Beldjilali 62’) - Benmoussa, Ardji (Hajhouj 60’), Darfalou

18 March 2018 Second leg	USM Alger (Algeria)	1–1 (3 (a) –3 agg.)	(Democratic Republic of the Congo) AS Maniema Union	Algiers
18:00 UTC+1	Abdellaoui (yellow card) 59'; Darfalou (yellow card) 36' (goal) 82'	Report	(yellow card) 39' Mbuka; 89' Manzoki	Stadium: Omar Hamadi Stadium; Attendance: 7,500; Referee: Jerry Yekeh (Liberia)
Note: Lineup for USM Alger - Zemmamouche - Abdellaoui, Chafaï, Cherifi, Meftah - Benguit (Sayoud 65’), Koudri, Benkhemassa - Benmoussa, Ardji, Darfalou

===== Play-off round =====
7 April 2018 first leg	Plateau United (Nigeria)	2–1	(Algeria) USM Alger	Lagos
16:00 UTC+1	Osanga 20'; James 76'	Report	(yellow card) 12' Benguit; 56' Yaya; (yellow card) 75' Benyahia; (yellow card) 89' Chafaï	Stadium: Agege Stadium; Attendance: 1,000; Referee: Victor Gomes (South Africa)
Note: Lineup for USM Alger - Zemmamouche - Abdellaoui, Chafaï, Benyahia, Meftah - Benguit, Koudri, Benkhemassa (Hamia 33’), Benmoussa - Yaya, Darfalou

17 April 2018 Second leg	USM Alger (Algeria)	4–0 (5–2 agg.)	(Nigeria) Plateau United	Algiers
18:00 UTC+1	Darfalou 29', 49'; Beldjilali 44'; Benkhemassa 82'	Report	(yellow card) 2' Ambrose; (yellow card) 8' Saleh	Stadium: July 5, 1962 Stadium; Attendance: 10,000; Referee: Maguette N'Diaye (Senegal)
Note: Lineup for USM Alger - Zemmamouche - Abdellaoui, Chafaï, Benmoussa, Meftah - Benguit, Koudri (Chita 77’), Beldjilali (Benkhemassa 64’) - Meziane (Ardji 70’), Yaya, Darfalou

==== Group stage ====
Pos	Team	Pld	W	D	L	GF	GA	GD	Pts	Qualification	USM	RAY	GOR	YAN
1	(Algeria) USM Alger	6	3	2	1	10	5	+5	11	Quarter-finals	—	1–1	2–1	4–0
2	(Rwanda) Rayon Sports	6	2	3	1	6	5	+1	9	Quarter-finals	1–2	—	1–1	1–0
3	(Kenya) Gor Mahia	6	2	2	2	10	7	+3	8		0–0	1–2	—	4–0
4	(Tanzania) Young Africans	6	1	1	4	4	13	−9	4		2–1	0–0	2–3	—

Source: CAF

6 May 2018 Matchday 1	USM Alger (Algeria)	4–0	(Tanzania) Young Africans	Algiers
20:00 UTC+1	Darfalou 4' (yellow card) 70'; Chafaï 32'; Meziane 53'; Zemmamouche 90+2' (pen.)	Report	Mahadhi (yellow card) 64'; Juma Ali (yellow card) 83'	Stadium: Stade du 5 Juillet; Referee: Daniel Laryea (Ghana)

16 May 2018 Matchday 2	Gor Mahia (Kenya)	0–0	(Algeria) USM Alger	Nairobi
19:00 UTC+3	Mahadhi (yellow card) 33' (yellow-red card) 55'	Report	Bouderbal (yellow card) 44'	Stadium: Moi International Sports Centre; Referee: Mahamadou Keita (Mali)

== Squad information ==
=== Appearances and goals ===
No.	Pos	Player	Nat	Ligue 1			Algerian Cup			Champions League			Confederation Cup			Total		
No.	Pos	Player	Nat	App	St	G	App	St	G	App	St	G	App	St	G	App	St	G
Goalkeepers
1	GK	Lamine Zemmamouche	(Algeria)	25	25	0	2	2	0	5	5	0	6	6	1	38	38	1
16	GK	Ismaïl Mansouri	(Algeria)	2	2	0	1	1	0	0	0	0	0	0	0	3	3	0
30	GK	Mourad Berrefane	(Algeria)	2	2	0	1	0	0	0	0	0	0	0	0	3	2	0
	GK	Abdelmoumen Sifour (Note: Player from USM Alger Reserve)	(Algeria)	1	1	0	0	0	0	0	0	0	0	0	0	1	1	0
Defenders
3	DF	Ayoub Abdellaoui	(Algeria)	23	23	1	2	2	0	5	5	1	6	6	0	36	36	2
5	DF	Mohamed Benyahia	(Algeria)	14	12	2	2	2	0	0	0	0	3	3	0	19	17	2
6	DF	Farouk Chafaï	(Algeria)	24	24	3	2	2	0	5	5	0	6	6	1	37	37	4
19	DF	Redouane Cherifi	(Algeria)	17	16	0	1	1	0	1	0	0	2	2	0	21	19	0
~~20~~	DF	Nacereddine Khoualed (Note: Player transferred out during the season)	(Algeria)	3	2	0	0	0	0	1	0	0	0	0	0	4	2	0
21	DF	Mehdi Benchikhoune	(Algeria)	5	5	0	0	0	0	0	0	0	1	1	0	6	6	0
22	DF	Mohamed Rabie Meftah	(Algeria)	19	19	1	2	2	1	5	5	0	5	5	0	31	31	2
25	DF	Mokhtar Benmoussa	(Algeria)	24	20	3	2	2	0	5	5	0	5	4	0	36	31	3
27	DF	Raouf Benguit	(Algeria)	15	14	0	2	2	0	4	4	0	6	6	0	27	26	0
42	DF	Abdeldjalil Semmane	(Algeria)	2	2	0	0	0	0	0	0	0	0	0	0	2	2	0
Midfielders
2	MF	Oussama Chita	(Algeria)	18	13	0	3	2	0	0	0	0	1	0	0	22	15	0
~~4~~	MF	Soumaila Sidibe	(Mali)	5	1	0	1	1	0	2	0	0	0	0	0	8	2	0
7	MF	Faouzi Yaya	(Algeria)	19	16	3	1	1	0	2	0	0	0	0	0	22	17	3
8	MF	Kaddour Beldjilali	(Algeria)	18	12	0	0	0	0	2	1	0	2	1	1	22	14	1
~~10~~	MF	Ziri Hammar	(Algeria)	10	5	2	0	0	0	4	2	1	0	0	0	14	7	3
~~14~~	MF	Faouzi Bourenane	(Algeria)	2	0	0	1	0	0	0	0	0	0	0	0	3	0	0
~~17~~	MF	Mohamed Benkablia	(Algeria)	3	1	0	0	0	0	2	0	0	0	0	0	5	1	0
18	MF	Amir Sayoud	(Algeria)	13	7	0	3	2	1	2	1	0	2	0	0	20	10	1
23	MF	Hamza Koudri	(Algeria)	18	14	1	2	2	0	4	4	0	6	5	0	30	25	1
24	MF	Mohammed Benkhemassa	(Algeria)	22	22	1	2	2	0	5	4	0	6	4	1	35	32	2
26	MF	Reda Bellahcene	(Algeria)	10	6	0	1	1	0	0	0	0	1	1	0	12	8	0
20	MF	Rafik Bouderbal	(Algeria)	8	1	1	0	0	0	0	0	0	2	2	0	10	3	1
15	MF	Oualid Ardji	(Algeria)	8	7	0	1	0	0	0	0	0	4	2	1	13	9	1
31	MF	Ilyes Yaiche	(Algeria)	7	3	0	1	0	0	0	0	0	1	0	0	9	3	0
84	MF	Mohamed Reda Boumechra	(Algeria)	7	3	1	0	0	0	0	0	0	0	0	0	7	3	1
54	MF	Billel Benhammouda	(Algeria)	6	0	0	0	0	0	0	0	0	0	0	0	6	0	0
	MF	Zinedine Asli	(Algeria)	1	0	0	0	0	0	0	0	0	0	0	0	1	0	0
Forwards
9	FW	Okacha Hamzaoui	(Algeria)	9	5	1	0	0	0	5	3	1	0	0	0	14	8	2
11	FW	Abderrahmane Meziane	(Algeria)	18	15	2	2	1	0	5	5	1	3	3	1	28	24	4
13	FW	Oussama Darfalou	(Algeria)	27	26	18	2	2	0	5	5	3	5	5	5	39	38	26
10	FW	Reda Hajhouj	(Morocco)	8	5	2	1	1	0	0	0	0	1	0	0	10	6	2
17	FW	Mohamed Amine Hamia	(Algeria)	3	1	0	1	0	0	0	0	0	1	0	0	5	1	0
Total				30		43	3		2	5		6	6		12	44		63

Last updated: 17 June 2022
Source: soccerway.com

=== Disciplinary record ===
No.	Pos.	Player	Ligue 1			Algerian Cup			Champions League			Confederation Cup			Total		
No.	Pos.	Player	Yellow card	(yellow card) (yellow-red card)	Red card	Yellow card	(yellow card) (yellow-red card)	Red card	Yellow card	(yellow card) (yellow-red card)	Red card	Yellow card	(yellow card) (yellow-red card)	Red card	Yellow card	(yellow card) (yellow-red card)	Red card
1	GK	(Algeria) Lamine Zemmamouche	5	0	0	0	0	0	1	0	0	0	0	0	6	0	0
16	GK	(Algeria) Ismaïl Mansouri	0	0	0	0	0	1	0	0	0	0	0	0	0	0	1
3	DF	(Algeria) Ayoub Abdellaoui	5	1	1	0	0	0	2	0	0	1	0	0	8	1	1
5	DF	(Algeria) Mohamed Benyahia	1	0	0	0	0	0	0	0	0	1	0	0	2	0	0
6	DF	(Algeria) Farouk Chafaï	6	0	0	0	0	0	1	0	0	1	0	0	8	0	0
19	DF	(Algeria) Redouane Cherifi	1	0	0	0	0	0	0	0	0	0	0	0	1	0	0
~~20~~	DF	(Algeria) Nacereddine Khoualed	1	0	0	0	0	0	0	0	0	0	0	0	1	0	0
22	DF	(Algeria) Mohamed Rabie Meftah	6	0	0	1	0	0	1	0	0	0	0	0	8	0	0
25	DF	(Algeria) Mokhtar Benmoussa	1	0	0	0	0	0	1	0	0	0	0	0	2	0	0
27	DF	(Algeria) Raouf Benguit	4	1	2	2	0	0	0	0	0	1	0	0	7	1	2
~~4~~	MF	(Mali) Soumaila Sidibe	1	0	0	1	0	0	0	0	0	0	0	0	2	0	0
7	MF	(Algeria) Faouzi Yaya	0	0	0	1	0	0	0	0	0	0	0	0	1	0	0
8	MF	(Algeria) Kaddour Beldjilali	1	0	0	0	0	0	0	0	0	0	0	0	1	0	0
~~10~~	MF	(Algeria) Ziri Hammar	1	0	0	0	0	0	0	0	0	0	0	0	1	0	0
23	MF	(Algeria) Hamza Koudri	4	0	0	0	0	0	0	0	0	0	0	0	4	0	0
24	MF	(Algeria) Mohammed Benkhemassa	11	0	0	0	0	0	0	0	0	0	0	0	11	0	0
26	MF	(Algeria) Reda Bellahcene	1	0	0	0	0	0	0	0	0	0	0	0	1	0	0
20	MF	(Algeria) Rafik Bouderbal	0	0	0	0	0	0	0	0	0	1	0	0	1	0	0
11	FW	(Algeria) Abderrahmane Meziane	1	0	0	0	0	0	0	0	0	0	0	0	1	0	0
13	FW	(Algeria) Oussama Darfalou	1	0	0	0	0	0	1	0	0	2	0	0	4	0	0
Total			51	2	3	5	0	1	7	0	0	7	0	0	70	2	4

==== Suspensions ====
Date Incurred	Nation	Name	Games Missed	Reason
21 June 2017	(Algeria)	Amir Sayoud	3	(red card) (vs. Zamalek)
28 October 2017	(Algeria)	Mohammed Benkhemassa	1	Yellow card
16 November 2017	(Algeria)	Mohamed Rabie Meftah	1	(yellow card) (Note: A penalty of one match by the Disciplinary Committee.)
28 November 2017	(Algeria)	Raouf Benguit	1	(yellow card) (Note: A penalty of one match by the Disciplinary Committee because of the protest.)
5 December 2017	(Algeria)	Nacereddine Khoualed	1	(yellow card)
8 December 2017	(Algeria)	Raouf Benguit	1	(red card) (vs. JS Kabylie)
12 December 2017	(Algeria)	Ayoub Abdellaoui	2	(red card) (vs. ES Sétif)
12 December 2017	(Algeria)	Mohammed Benkhemassa	1	Yellow card
6 January 2018	(Algeria)	Mohamed Lamine Zemmamouche	1	(yellow card) (yellow card) (Note: A penalty of one match by the Disciplinary Committee.)
6 January 2018	(Algeria)	Mohamed Rabie Meftah	1	(yellow card) (yellow card)
16 January 2018	(Algeria)	Ismaïl Mansouri	?	(red card) (vs. CS Constantine)
20 January 2018	(Algeria)	Mohammed Benkhemassa	1	Yellow card
9 February 2018	(Algeria)	Mohammed Benkhemassa	1	(yellow card)
13 March 2018	(Algeria)	Raouf Benguit	1	(red card) (vs. ES Sétif)
30 March 2018	(Algeria)	Farouk Chafaï	1	Yellow card
20 April 2018	(Algeria)	Raouf Benguit	4	(red card) (vs. CS Constantine)
20 April 2018	(Algeria)	Ayoub Abdellaoui	3	(red card) (vs. CS Constantine)
20 April 2018	(Algeria)	Mohamed Meftah	1	
20 April 2018	(Algeria)	Hamza Koudri	8	
6 May 2018	(Algeria)	Oussama Darfalou	1	Yellow card

=== Goalscorers ===
Includes all competitive matches. The list is sorted alphabetically by surname when total goals are equal.

No.	Nat.	Player	Pos.	L1	AC	CL1	CC3	TOTAL
13	(Algeria)	Oussama Darfalou	FW	18	0	3	5	26
6	(Algeria)	Farouk Chafaï	DF	3	0	1	1	5
7	(Algeria)	Faouzi Yaya	MF	3	0	0	1	4
11	(Algeria)	Abderrahmane Meziane	FW	2	0	1	1	4
25	(Algeria)	Mokhtar Benmoussa	DF	3	0	0	0	3
15	(Algeria)	Ziri Hammar	MF	2	0	1	0	3
5	(Algeria)	Mohamed Benyahia	DF	2	0	0	0	2
9	(Algeria)	Okacha Hamzaoui	FW	1	0	1	0	2
10	(Morocco)	Reda Hajhouj	FW	2	0	0	0	2
22	(Algeria)	Mohamed Meftah	DF	1	1	0	0	2
3	(Algeria)	Ayoub Abdellaoui	DF	1	0	1	0	2
24	(Algeria)	Mohammed Benkhemassa	MF	1	0	0	1	2
84	(Algeria)	Mohamed Reda Boumechra	MF	1	0	0	0	1
26	(Algeria)	Reda Bellahcene	MF	0	0	1	0	1
18	(Algeria)	Amir Sayoud	MF	0	1	0	0	1
20	(Algeria)	Rafik Bouderbal	MF	1	0	0	0	1
15	(Algeria)	Oualid Ardji	MF	0	0	0	1	1
23	(Algeria)	Hamza Koudri	MF	1	0	0	0	1
8	(Algeria)	Kaddour Beldjilali	MF	0	0	0	1	1
1	(Algeria)	Mohamed Lamine Zemmamouche	GK	0	0	0	1	1
Own Goals				1	0	0	0	1
Totals				43	2	9	12	66

=== Clean sheets ===
Includes all competitive matches.

No.	Nat	Name	L 1	AC	CL 1	CL 3	Total
1	(Algeria)	Lamine Zemmamouche	9	1	3	3	16
16	(Algeria)	Ismaïl Mansouri	–	–	–	–	–
30	(Algeria)	Mourad Berrefane	–	–	–	–	–
		TOTALS	9	1	3	3	16

== Kit ==
Supplier: Joma, the beginning of the year 2017. Sponsor: Djezzy

Home	Away	Third
