= 2014 Algerian Super Cup =

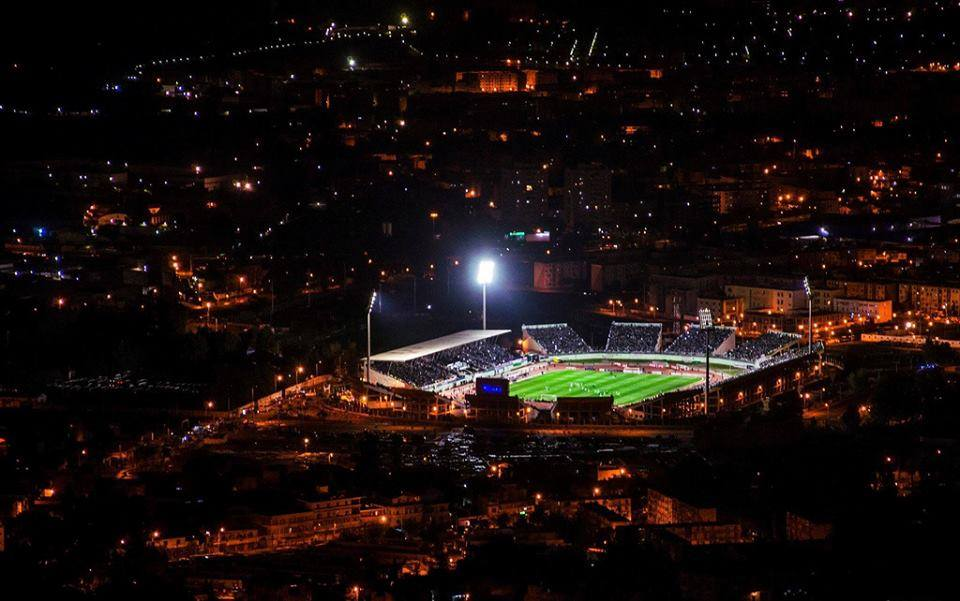
- Mustapha Tchaker Stadium hosted the match
USM Alger	MC Alger
Ligue 1	Algerian Cup
0	1
- Date: 9 August 2014
- Venue: Mustapha Tchaker Stadium, Blida
- Referee: Mehdi Abid Charef
- Attendance: 7,000
- Weather: Sunny

The 2014 Algerian Super Cup is the 8th edition of Algerian Super Cup, a football match contested by the winners of the Ligue 1 and 2013–14 Algerian Cup competitions. The match was played on 9 August 2014 at Mustapha Tchaker Stadium in Blida. Algerian Cup winners MC Alger defeated Ligue 1 winners USM Alger with a score of 1-0.

== Match details ==
9 August 2014
17:30

USM Alger	0–1	MC Alger
	Report	Aouedj 81'

Mustapha Tchaker Stadium, Blida
Attendance: 7.000
Referee: Mehdi Abid Charef

1	(Algeria) Mohamed Zemmamouche
30	(Algeria) Mohamed Rabie Meftah	(substituted off) 86'
26	(Algeria) Brahim Boudebouda
20	(Algeria) Nacereddine Khoualed (c)
6	(Algeria) Farouk Chafaï
13	(Algeria) Nassim Bouchema
23	(Algeria) Hamza Koudri	(substituted off) 79'	(yellow card) 90'
15	(Algeria) Bouazza Feham
7	(Algeria) Zinedine Ferhat	(substituted off) 74'
14	(Algeria) Rachid Nadji
9	(Madagascar) Carolus Andriamatsinoro
Substitutes :
8	(Algeria) Akim Orinel	(substituted on) 79'
25	(Algeria) Mokhtar Benmoussa	(substituted on) 86'
19	(Cameroon) Ernest Nsombo	(substituted on) 74'
Manager :
(France) Hubert Velud

1	(Algeria) Faouzi Chaouchi
27	(Algeria) Abderahmane Hachoud
3	(Algeria) Toufik Zeghdane
5	(Algeria) Koceila Berchiche
22	(Algeria) Ayoub Azzi		(yellow card) 69'
14	(Algeria) Amir Karaoui		(yellow card) 87'
8	(Algeria) Karim Hendou
18	(Gabon) Samson Mbingui
7	(Algeria) Kaled Gourmi
17	(Algeria) Moustapha Djallit	(substituted off) 66'
11	(Algeria) Sid Ahmed Aouedj	(substituted off) 84'
Substitutes :
9	(Guinea) Ibrahima Kalil Sylla	(substituted on) 66'
26	(Algeria) Sabri Gharbi	(substituted on) 84'
Manager :
(Algeria) Boualem Charef
