= 2015–16 Algerian Cup =

- Stade du 5 Juillet hosted the final

Tournament details
- Country: Algeria
- Dates: 17 December 2015 – 1 May 2016
- Teams: 64 (as of first national round)

Final positions
- Champions: MC Alger
- Runners-up: NA Hussein Dey

Tournament statistics
- Matches played: 32
- Goals scored: 92 (2.88 per match)
- Top goal scorer(s): Mohamed Derrag (3 goals); El Almi Daoudi (3 goals); Mohamed Herida (3 goals); Eudes Dagoulou (3 goals); Abdellah El Mouden (3 goals); Chouaib Houadef (3 goals); Abdelkader Bouzar (3 goals)

The 2015–16 Algerian Cup is the 52nd edition of the Algerian Cup. The winners were MC Alger who qualified to the 2017 CAF Confederation Cup. MO Béjaïa were the defending champions, having beaten RC Arbaâ 1–0 in the previous season's final.

== Round of 64 ==
17 December 2015	USM Alger	1–3	Paradou AC	Bologhine
17:00	Aradji 37'	Report	23' Kherifi; 68' Attal; 81' Mansouri	Stadium: Stade Omar Hamadi; Referee: Helalchi, Brahim, Doulache

17 December 2015	MC Alger	2–0	USM Oran	Belouizdad
17:00	Derrardja 32', 46'	Report		Stadium: Stade 20 Août 1955; Referee: Arab, Bioud, Hamlaoui

18 December 2015	SCM Oran	8–0	NSD Bouda	Oran
14:15	Atti 14'; Haddou 31'; Sahraoui 44'; Benathmane 45' (o.g.); Benmaâziz 61'; Ameur 67', 75'; Kdider 87'	Report		Stadium: Stade Habib Bouakeul; Referee: Bekouassa, Slimani, Aouza

18 December 2015	RA Ain Defla	2–1	JSM Tiaret	Ain Defla
14:45	Houadef 12'; Bekbouka 62'	Report	63' (pen.) Badache	Stadium: Stade Khelal Abdelkader; Referee: Sahouadj, Mesbah, Bencherifa

18 December 2015	IRB El Kerma	0–0 (a.e.t.) (8–7 p)	ES Guelma	El Kerma
14:45		Report		Stadium: Stade Bahi Amar; Referee: Achouri, Bou-rahla, Amari

18 December 2015	JSM Bejaïa	0–2	EC Oued Smar	Béjaïa
16:00		Report	Sellam 7'; Djahmoum 78'	Stadium: Stade de l'Unité Maghrébine; Referee: Boucetta, Touil, Yamani

18 December 2015	MC Debdaba	1–2	CRB Ouled Djellal	Béchar
16:00	Meskouri 26' (pen.)	Report	Fassi 3'; Chatil 5'	Stadium: Stade 20 Août 1955

18 December 2015	CR Belouizdad	4–1	ASO Chlef	Belouizdad
16:00	Derrag 22', 46' (pen.), 53'; Bougueroua 90+1'	Report	Elaïd 77'	Stadium: Stade 20 Août 1955; Referee: Abid Charef, Tamen, Boulfelfel

18 December 2015	MC El Eulma	1–0 (a.e.t.)	CS Constantine	El Eulma
16:00	Madani 116'	Report		Stadium: Stade Messaoud Zougar; Referee: Mial, Salaouadji et Bourouba

19 December 2015	CR Béni Thour	3–2 (a.e.t.)	NRB Ogla	Ouargla
14:15	Chenine 13'; Belbarka 64'; Ouerdi 113' (pen.)	Report	23' Rebie; 81' Mimouni	Stadium: Olympic Ouargla Stadium; Referee: Boudjrada, Badache, Tizimene

19 December 2015	JS Azzaba	1–1 (a.e.t.) (3–4 p)	USM Bel-Abbès	Skikda
14:15	Cheniguer 43'	Report	Balegh 23'	Stadium: Stade 20 Août 1955; Referee: Hansal, Chila, Rahmouni

19 December 2015	ASM Oran	5–1	NR Dely Brahim	Oran
14:15	Djemaouni 11', 26'; Benkablia 43'; Aouad 54'; Tahar 74'	Report	Salem 42'	Stadium: Stade Habib Bouakeul; Referee: Zouaoui, Kechida, Halitime

19 December 2015	DRB Tadjenanet	4–0	MB Hassi Messaoud	Tadjenanet
14:15	Chibane 45' (pen.), 79'; Mouaden 53', 75'	Report		Stadium: Lahoua Smaïl Stadium; Referee: Ledraâ, Didou, Flidja

19 December 2015	E Collo	1–0	IRB Ouled Yaich	Collo
14:15	Kherif 86' (o.g.)	Report		Stadium: Stade Amar Bendjemâa; Referee: Meghni, Bouyemma, Yahia Cherif

19 December 2015	ESB Dahmouni	2–1	RC Kouba	Tiaret
14:15		Report		Stadium: Stade Abderrahim; Referee: Benabdellah, Bouzegueri, Arbadji

19 December 2015	HB Chelghoum Laïd	1–0	AB Barika	Mila
14:15	Ghazi 80'	Report		Stadium: Stade OPOW 11 Décembre 1960; Referee: Mahkouk, Othmane, Madour

19 December 2015	USB Tissemsilt	1–0	IB Lakhdaria	Tissemsilt
14:15	Hirèche 57'	Report		Stadium: Stade Djillali Bounaâma

19 December 2015	CRB Aïn Fakroun	2–0	NRB Touggourt	Aïn Fakroun
14:15	Bellalem 21'; Oukrif 67'	Report		Stadium: Stade Said Allag; Referee: Amraoui, Allaoui, Yahiaoui

19 December 2015	ES Azzefoun	2–2 (a.e.t.) (5–6 p)	US Biskra	Azeffoun
14:15	Amerkane 2' (pen.); Si Ali 97' (pen.)	Report	18', 91' (pen.) Louz	Stadium: Stade Aït Amar Djaffar; Referee: Choul, Bazine, Mogar

19 December 2015	USM El Harrach	1–1 (a.e.t.) (4–2 p)	IRB Maghnia	El Harrach
14:15	Younes 52'	Report	Hebiri 55'	Stadium: Stade 1er Novembre 1954; Referee: Gamouh, Benchaâbia et Benhacen

19 December 2015	CRB Kais	2–2 (a.e.t.) (2–3 p)	JS Djijel	Khenchla
14:15	Barki 78'; Mekloula 118'	Report	33' Khetout; 91' Mahrouk	Stadium: Stade Hamam Ammar; Referee: Safri, Guachi, Hafdi

19 December 2015	ES Sétif	3–1	WR M'Sila	Sétif
14:15	Dagoulou 50'; Kouriba 53'; Saidi 86'	Report	Khelifi 90'	Stadium: Stade 8 Mai 1945; Referee: Bouabdallah, Bouhassoun, Bourchou

19 December 2015	US Tebessa	1–0	ES Bouakel	Tébessa
14:15	Rachededdine 19'	Report		Stadium: Stade du 4 Mars; Referee: Kasmi, Alouane, Badache

19 December 2015	USM Blida	3–2 (a.e.t.)	OM Arzew	Blida
14:15	Benayada 40'; Sylla 70'; Bendiaf 104'	Report	Aissaoui 54' (pen.); Baouch 84'	Stadium: Stade Frères Brakni; Referee: Hamza Bouslimani, Rimouch, Belbachir

19 December 2015	SC Ain Defla	0–1	ASB Maghnia	Ain Defla
14:15		Report	Bouzar 89' (pen.)	Stadium: Stade Khelal Abdelkader; Referee: Boussaadia, Guessoum, Boudebouz

19 December 2015	AS Aïn M'lila	0–0 (a.e.t.) (6–5 p)	USM Chéraga	Aïn M'lila
14:15		[ Report]		Stadium: Stade des frères Demane Debbih; Referee: Taroudi, Benamira, Dihat

19 December 2015	JS Saoura	3–0	IRB Bou Medfaa	Béchar
14:15	Zaidi 4', 69'; Sayah 49'	Report		Stadium: Stade 20 Août 1955

19 December 2015	ARB Ghriss	3–1	NT Souf	Mascara
14:15	Gasmi 20'; Moukhtar 51'; Ouazar 85' (pen.)	Report	Lifa 26'	Stadium: Stade Meftah Aouad; Referee: Bendjehane, Ayed, Belguerfi

19 December 2015	RC Relizane	1–0	JS Kabylie	Relizane
14:15	Kouadio 68'	Report		Stadium: Stade Tahar Zoughari; Referee: Necib, Meghlout, Benacer

19 December 2015	RC Arbaâ	2–1	ORBG Bousbaa	Larbaâ
14:15	Bousaïd 84'; Amara 90'	Report	29' Daseri	Stadium: Stade Ismaïl Makhlouf; Referee: Benchehida, Oukil, Larbaoui

19 December 2015	MC Oran	1–2	MO Béjaïa	Oran
16:00	Larbi 77' (pen.)	Report	Yaya 14', 90'	Stadium: Stade Ahmed Zabana; Referee: Boukouassa, Rachedi, Bounoua

19 December 2015	NA Hussein Dey	5–0	NRB Bouchegouf	Belouizdad
16:00	Herida 73', 81'; Drifel 83', 88'; Ouhadda 86'	Report		Stadium: Stade 20 Août 1955; Referee: Boussaïd, Amrane, Benada

== Round of 32 ==
8 January 2016	USM El Harrach	2–0	IRB El Kerma	El Harrach
14:45	Meziane 32'; Bouguèche 79'	Report		Stadium: Stade 1er Novembre 1954; Referee: Bahloul, Amri, Benhamouda

8 January 2016	SCM Oran	0–1	USM Bel-Abbès	Oran
16:00		Report	90' Bennai	Stadium: Stade Ahmed Zabana; Referee: Saïdi, Hadj Saïd, Miraoui

8 January 2016	MC El Eulma	1–1 (a.e.t.) (2–4 p)	CRB Aïn Fakroun	El Eulma
16:00	Noubli 42'	Report	45' Boukhari	Stadium: Stade Messaoud Zougar; Referee: Halalchi, Bounoua, Doulache

8 January 2016	MC Alger	1–0	US Biskra	Bologhine
16:00	Merzougui 40'	Report		Stadium: Stade Omar Hamadi; Attendance: 0 (close doors); Referee: Ghorbal, Zerhouni, Benali

9 January 2016	HB Chelghoum Laïd	1–0	E Collo	Mila
14:00	Nait Slimane 30'	Report		Stadium: Stade OPOW 11 Décembre 1960; Referee: Oukil, Serradj, Abid

9 January 2016	RA Aïn Defla	4–2 (a.e.t.)	CRB Ouled Djellal	Ain Defla
14:30	Houadef 95', 102'; Melloudi 96'; Fekir 115' (pen.)	Report	80' Fassi; 117' Chakir	Stadium: Stade Khelal Abdelkader; Referee: Chenoune, Bazine, Mougar

9 January 2016	RC Arbaâ	1–0	USB Tissemsilt	Larbaâ
14:30	Guessan 60'	Report		Stadium: Stade Ismaïl Makhlouf; Referee: Bouzerar, Yahi et Messaoudi

9 January 2016	CR Béni Thour	0–3	Paradou AC	Ouargla
14:30		Report	20' Bouabta; 37' Meziani; 90' Choukri	Stadium: Olympic Ouargla Stadium; Referee: Aouina, Benaissa, Chnaoua

9 January 2016	US Tébessa	1–1 (a.e.t.) (7–6 p)	USM Blida	Tébessa
14:30	Eulmi 18'	Report	19' Laïfaoui	Stadium: Stade du 4 Mars

9 January 2016	EC Oued Smar	1–1 (a.e.t.) (1–2 p)	DRB Tadjenanet	El Harrach
14:30	Djahmoune 90'	Report	27' El Mouden	Stadium: Stade 1er Novembre 1954

9 January 2016	AS Aïn M'lila	0–1	ASB Maghnia	Aïn M'lila
14:30		Report	28' (pen.) Bouzar	Stadium: Stade des frères Demane Debbih

9 January 2016	ASM Oran	0–0 (a.e.t.) (2–4 p)	ARB Ghriss	Oran
14:30		Report		Stadium: Stade Habib Bouakeul; Referee: Bassiri, Azzaoui, Arraf

9 January 2016	ESB Dahmouni	0–1	RC Relizane	Tiaret
14:30		Report	1' (pen.) Tiaïba	Stadium: Stade Abderrahim; Referee: Kdem, Atrouss, Benaïssa

9 January 2016	MO Béjaïa	1–1 (a.e.t.) (3–1 p)	JS Djijel	Béjaïa
16:00	Ndoye 104'	Report	118' Zine Mehdi	Stadium: Stade de l'Unité Maghrébine; Referee: Houasnia, Azrine, Tazrout

9 January 2016	ES Sétif	2–1 (a.e.t.)	CR Belouizdad	Sétif
16:00	Ziaya 7' (pen.); Dagoulou 92'	Report	43' Bougueroua	Stadium: Stade 8 Mai 1945; Referee: Benouza, Oumari, Ayad

9 January 2016	NA Hussein Dey	0–0 (a.e.t.) (4–3 p)	JS Saoura	Belouizdad
16:00		Report		Stadium: Stade 20 Août 1955; Referee: Zouaoui, Boulfelfel, Tamen

== Round of 16 ==
19 February 2016	US Tébessa	1–0	USM El Harrach	Tébessa
15:00	Daoudi 20' (pen.)	Report		Stadium: Stade du 4 Mars; Referee: Achouri, Benhamouda, Amri

19 February 2016	ARB Ghriss	1–0 (a.e.t.)	CRB Aïn Fakroun	Mascara
15:00	Laroussi 120'	Report		Stadium: Stade Meftah Aouad; Referee: Bouslimani, Belbachir, Rimouche

20 February 2016	RC Relizane	1–2	MC Alger	Relizane
15:00	Djerrar 88' (pen.)	Report	Aouedj 18'; Gourmi 78'	Stadium: Stade Tahar Zoughari; Referee: Abid Charef, Boulfelfel, Itchiali

20 February 2016	USM Bel-Abbès	1–0	DRB Tadjenanet	Sidi Bel Abbès
15:00	Bennai 73'	Report		Stadium: Stade 24 Fevrier 1956; Referee: Mial, Bounoua, Selaouadji

20 February 2016	ES Sétif	2–1	RC Arbaâ	Sétif
16:00	Dagoulou 60'; Djahnit 65'	Report	28' Yachir	Stadium: Stade 8 Mai 1945; Referee: Houasnia, Gourari, Tazourt

20 February 2016	ASB Maghnia	1–0	HB Chelghoum Laid	Maghnia
15:00	Bouzar 58'	Report		Stadium: Stade Frères Nouali; Referee: Ibrahim, Bourouba, Badache

20 February 2016	Paradou AC	1–0	RA Aïn Defla	Bologhine
15:00	Benouadah 60'	Report		Stadium: Stade Omar Hamadi; Referee: Oukil, Zerhouni, Benali

20 February 2016	MO Béjaïa	1–2 (a.e.t.)	NA Hussein Dey	Béjaïa
16:00	Ndoye 58'	Report	16', 91' Benaldjia	Stadium: Stade de l'Unité Maghrébine; Referee: Boukouassa, Brahim, Rachedi

== Quarter-finals ==
4 March 2016	ES Sétif	1–3	USM Bel-Abbès	Sétif
16:00	Ziaya 48' (pen.)	Report; Live TV: Algérie 3	78' (pen.), 88' Meguehout; 85' Ghezzali	Stadium: Stade 8 Mai 1945; Referee: Boukouassa, Ibrahim, Rachedi

4 March 2016	NA Hussein Dey	2–0	Paradou AC	Belouizdad
16:00	Mbingui 10'; Gasmi 45'	Report; Live TV: TV Tamazight 4		Stadium: Stade 20 Août 1955; Referee: Abid Charef, Boulfelfel, Samen

5 March 2016	ARB Ghriss	0–2	MC Alger	Mascara
16:00		Report; Live TV: Algérie 3	13' Gourmi; 70' (o.g.) Baghdad	Stadium: Stade de l'Unité Africaine; Referee: Necib, Benaceur, Hamlaoui

5 March 2016	US Tébessa	1–0	ASB Maghnia	Tébessa
15:00	Douadi 35' (pen.)	Report; Live TV: Canal Algérie		Stadium: Stade du 4 Mars; Referee: Benbrahem, Gourari, Alloua

== Semi-finals ==
14 April 2016	NA Hussein Dey	1–0	USM Bel-Abbès	Algiers
17:00	Mbingui 90'	Report; Live TV: Algérie 3 / Al Kass Sports		Stadium: Stade 5 Juillet 1962; Referee: Necib, Tamen, Meghlout

16 April 2016	MC Alger	3–0	US Tébessa	Algiers
16:00	Zeghdane 4'; Abid 25' (pen.); Hachoud 64'	Report; Live TV: Algérie 3 / Al Kass Sports		Stadium: Stade 5 Juillet 1962; Referee: Ghorbal, Itchiali, Hadj Said

== Final ==
May 1, 2016	MC Alger	1-0	NA Hussein Dey	Algiers
16:30	Hachoud 81'	Report; Live TV: beIN Sports / Canal Algérie / Al Kass Sports / Algérie 3		Stadium: Stade 5 Juillet 1962; Attendance: 60.000
