= Oussama Chita =

Algerian footballer (born 1996)

Personal information
- Full name: Oussama Chita
- Date of birth: 31 October 1996 (age 30)
- Place of birth: Khemis Miliana, Algeria
- Height: 1.85 m (6 ft 1 in)
- Position: Defensive midfielder

Team information
- Current team: JS El Biar
- Number: 8

Youth career
- SKAF Khemis Miliana
- 2012–2013: MC Alger

Senior career*
Years	Team	Apps	(Gls)
2013–2017	MC Alger	38	(1)
2017–2025	USM Alger	136	(2)
2025–2026	MC El Bayadh	11	(0)
2026–	JS El Biar	13	(1)

International career^{‡}
2014–15	Algeria U23	15	(0)
2018–	Algeria	2	(0)
- * Club domestic league appearances and goals as of 17 July 2026 ‡ National team caps and goals as of 18 November 2018

Oussama Chita (Arabic: أسامة شيتة; born 31 October 1996) is an Algerian footballer who plays as a central midfielder for JS El Biar.

== Career ==
=== MC Alger ===
In 2012, Oussama Chita joined the youth team of MC Alger coming from SKAF Khemis Miliana, in December 2013 Chita signed his first professional contract. On 1 March 2014, Chita played his first professional match against ASO Chlef as a substitute, Despite playing only one match in the Algerian Cup, Chita won the first title in his football career after winning against JS Kabylie.

On 30 January 2016, Chita scored the first goal in his football career against JS Saoura in a match that ended in a 1–2 loss. On 12 March, in the match against DRB Tadjenanet, Oussama Chita suffered a serious injury which required him to be taken out on a stretcher. MRI results revealed a cruciate ligament tear of the left knee requiring an average of more than six months of recovery. As a result, the young international midfielder will not play again this season.

=== USM Alger ===
On 4 July 2017, Oussama Chita joined USM Alger from neighboring MC Alger on a four-year contract, Chita explains that he left the club "because of certain people", with the feeling of not having been "considered" enough. On 3 November 2017, Chita played his first match with his new club in the Ligue 1 against Olympique de Médéa where he participated as a substitute. A week later, Chita participated in the first match as a starter against CS Constantine. In his second season, Chita scored his first goal against USM Bel-Abbès away from home in a match that ended in a 2–2 draw. On 2 March 2019, Chita left the match in the Ligue 1 against Paradou AC due to injury and after undergoing an MRI scan, it was found that he had a cut in the cruciate ligament. However at the end of the season, Chita achieved the first league title in its history, after winning the last round match against CS Constantine.

Every beginning has an end and today, I stand here to announce that I have reached the end of my journey with USM Alger. I spent 8 wonderful and unforgettable years with the team. It all started with my first title in 2019, then we carried the dream and soared to achieve the ultimate goal, lifting the club’s colors through two African titles. The journey ended in the best way possible by having the honor of raising the club’s ninth Algerian Cup after a 12-year absence from the trophy cabinet.
Alhamdulillah, this amazing experience was crowned with four titles that will forever remain etched in my football career. He who does not thank people, does not thank Allah. From this platform, I want to express my gratitude to all my teammates, the technical and administrative staff I’ve worked with throughout my time at the club, and to the loyal USMA fans who never abandoned us since the day I set foot in the Red Fortress. And to everyone who supported me and believed in me thank you.

— A message of thanks and farewell from Oussama Chita on Instagram.

On 22 October 2019, Oussama Chita resumed training with his teammates after a long absence due to a serious injury contracted last season at the knee. On 5 November 2020, Chita renewed his contract for three seasons until 2023, Victim of a serious knee injury, Chita had to wait many months before returning to competition at the start of the year. On 3 June 2023, Chita won the first international title in his football career by winning the 2022–23 CAF Confederation Cup after defeating Young Africans of Tanzania.

With the end of his contract Chita started talking about his new destination abroad. The Swiss club FC Lugano became interested in including him, especially the current situation of the player that encourages club leaders to sign him. However, on 16 August 2023, Oussama Chita renewed his contract for two seasons until 2026 along with nine other players. On 15 September 2023, Chita won the CAF Super Cup title after winning against Al Ahly, it is the second African title with USM Alger in three months.

On 8 July 2025, USM Alger announced the departure of Oussama Chita after eight years at the club. Chita played 197 matches and won four titles. The club praised his discipline, fighting spirit, and loyalty. Chita was among the few players to remain at the club for several consecutive seasons. His farewell comes just days after winning the Algerian Cup with USMA.

=== MC El Bayadh ===
On 30 August 2025, Chitta signed for MC El Bayadh.

=== JS El Biar ===
On 19 January 2026, he joined JS El Biar.

== International ==
In 2015, Pierre-André Schürmann the Algeria national under-23 football team coach called up Oussama Chita to participate in the Africa Cup of Nations that qualifies for the Summer Olympic Games. And in the first match against Egypt, Chita scored the equalizing goal and participated in all the matches and they were defeated in the final against Nigeria. Despite this, the Algerian team qualified for the Olympic Games for the first time in 36 years. However a few months before the start of the tournament, Chita suffered a serious injury which was a cut in the cruciate ligament, will keep him out of action for at least six months, which means his official absence from the Olympic Games. On 18 November 2018, Oussama Chita was called up by Djamel Belmadi for the first time to the Algeria national football team for the African Cup qualifiers match against Togo.

On 2 January 2023, Chita was selected for the 28-man squad to participate in the 2022 African Nations Championship. Where he played only one match in the group stage and reached the final, where they lost the title against Senegal. On 30 May 2023, the FAF publish the list of Djamel Belmadi for the two matches of the month of June, Where was Oussama Chita summoned for the first time in four years. This time due to a possible injury to Victor Lekhal, Chita has already come a long way. He had been on the very first lists of Belmadi at the end of 2018, Belmadi stated that he admires his player profile and that had it not been for the serious knee injury, he would have been present at the 2019 Africa Cup of Nations.

== Career statistics ==
=== Club ===
As of 5 July 2025

Club	Season	League			Cup		Continental		Other		Total	
Club	Season	Division	Apps	Goals	Apps	Goals	Apps	Goals	Apps	Goals	Apps	Goals
MC Alger	2013–14	Ligue 1	8	0	—		—		—		8	0
MC Alger	2014–15	Ligue 1	13	0	—		2 (Note: All appearance(s) in CAF Confederation Cup)	0	—		15	0
MC Alger	2015–16	Ligue 1	11	1	3	0	—		—		14	1
MC Alger	2016–17	Ligue 1	6	0	—		3	0	—		9	0
MC Alger	Total		38	1	3	0	5	0	—		46	1
USM Alger	2017–18	Ligue 1	18	0	3	0	1	0	—		22	0
USM Alger	2018–19	Ligue 1	21	1	3	0	5	0	3 (Note: All appearance(s) in Arab Club Champions Cup)	1	32	2
USM Alger	2019–20	Ligue 1	6	0	2	0	2 (Note: All appearance(s) in Champions League)	0	—		10	0
USM Alger	2020–21	Ligue 1	18	0	—		—		3 (Note: one appearance in Algerian Super Cup, two appearances in Algerian League Cup)	0	21	0
USM Alger	2021–22	Ligue 1	14	0	—		—		—		14	0
USM Alger	2022–23	Ligue 1	22	1	1	0	16	0	—		39	1
USM Alger	2023–24	Ligue 1	22	0	1	0	8 (Note: 1 appearance in CAF Super Cup, 7 appearances and 1 goal in CAF Confederation Cup)	1	—		31	1
USM Alger	2024–25	Ligue 1	17	0	5	0	6	0	—		13	0
USM Alger	Total		138	2	15	0	38	0	6	1	197	4
Career total			176	3	18	0	43	0	6	1	243	5

== Honours ==
=== Club ===
MC Alger

- Algerian Cup: 2013–14, 2015–16
- Algerian Super Cup: 2014

USM Alger

- Algerian Ligue Professionnelle 1: 2018–19
- Algerian Cup: 2024–25
- CAF Confederation Cup: 2022–23
- CAF Super Cup: 2023
