= Berchiche =

Berchiche is a surname. Notable people with the surname include:

- Koceila Berchiche (born 1985), Algerian footballer
- Yuri Berchiche (born 1990), Spanish footballer
