= Koceila =

Koceila is a masculine given name. Notable people with the name include:

- Koceila Berchiche (born 1985), Algerian footballer
- Koceila Mammeri (born 1999), Algerian badminton player
