= Khalid Jassem =

Qatari TV host (born 1977)

- خالد جاسم
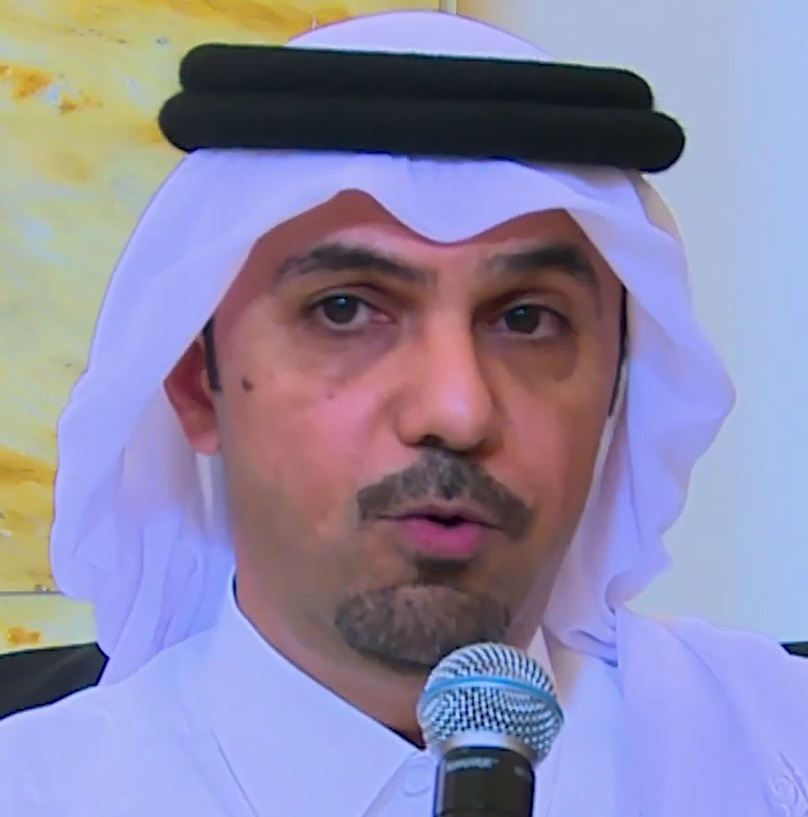
- Born: 27 August 1974 (age 51); Doha ، Qatar
- Occupations: TV host & writer
- Years active: 1993–present
- Known for: Al Kass Sports Channels

Khalid Jassem (Arabic: خالد جاسم) (born 27 August 1974) is a Qatari television presenter, television host, interviewer, and writer on Al Kass Sports Channels since 1993.

== Bio ==
Jassem born in Doha. He joined Qatar Television at the end of 1993 and moved to Al Jazeera in 1996. He has been a member of Al Jazeera and has served as Editor, Archivist, Correspondent and Head of Correspondents for the Sports Department worldwide. Until 2003, and then signed another contract for Al Jazeera Sports Channel, and in 2005 came out of AlJazeera Sports as a manager of the channel league and cup until May 2011, and then submitted his resignation from AlJazeera Sports.

== See also ==
- List of television presenters
- Jamal Rayyan
