= Sofiane Choubani =

French footballer (born 1990)

Personal information
- Date of birth: 29 March 1990 (age 36)
- Place of birth: Argenteuil, France
- Height: 1.79 m (5 ft 10 in)
- Position: Attacking midfielder

Team information
- Current team: La Roche
- Number: 23

Youth career
- 1996–1998: Bezons Omnisports
- 1998–2000: Cormeilles AS
- 2000–2004: Racing Club
- 2004–2010: FC Nantes

Senior career*
Years	Team	Apps	(Gls)
2010	FC Nantes	4	(0)
2010–2011	Angers	0	(0)
2011–2012	Drancy	11	(2)
2012–2013	Rodez	16	(1)
2013–2014	Ivry	26	(4)
2014–2015	USM Bel-Abbès	19	(2)
2015–2016	NA Hussein Dey	16	(3)
2016	UJA Maccabi Paris	9	(3)
2017	Sabah FA	7	(2)
2017	JSM Skikda		
2018–2019	Saint-Nazaire AF	25	(13)
2019–2020	Stade Poitevin	14	(4)
2020–2022	Le Poiré sur Vie	27	(8)
2022–2025	Challans	68	(16)
2025–	La Roche	0	(0)

International career
2010–2011	France U-20	13	(5)
- * Club domestic league appearances and goals as of 4 December 2025

Sofiane Choubani (born 29 March 1990) is a French footballer who plays for Ligue 3 club La Roche.

He played in the 2016 Algerian Cup Final for NA Hussein Dey.
