= Sofiane Ben Braham =

French footballer (born 1990)

Sofiane Ben Bruham
Personal information
- Date of birth: 1 February 1990 (age 36)
- Place of birth: Montfermeil, France
- Height: 1.83 m (6 ft 0 in)
- Position: Defender

Youth career
- Amiens SC

Senior career*
| Years | Team | Apps | (Gls) |
| 2010–2011 | AC Amiens | 16 | (0) |
| 2011–2013 | Red Star | 11 | (0) |
| 2013–2014 | AC Amiens | 23 | (0) |
| 2014–2016 | MC Alger | 39 | (1) |
| 2016–2017 | CS Constantine | 1 | (0) |
| 2017 | l'OM Médéa | 4 | (0) |
| 2017–? | ASM Oran | | |
| 2018–2019 | Racing Club de France Football | 3 | (0) |
| 2019 | Paris 13 Atletico | 1 | (0) |
- * Club domestic league appearances and goals

Sofiane Ben Braham (born 1 February 1990) is a French former professional footballer who played as a defender. Prior to moving to Algeria in 2014, Ben Braham had spent his playing career in the French lower leagues with AC Amiens and Red Star Saint-Ouen.

== Personal life ==
Sofiane Ben Braham was born in Montfermeil, in the eastern suburbs of Paris. He holds both French and Algerian nationalities.

== Honours ==
AC Amiens

- CFA2 Group A: 2010–11

MC Alger

- Algerian Super Cup: 2014
