= Mohamed Hikem =

Algerian footballer (born 1992)

Personal information
- Full name: Mohamed Hikem
- Date of birth: April 12, 1992 (age 34)
- Place of birth: Draâ Ben Khedda, Algeria
- Positions: Central defender; midfielder

Team information
- Current team: MC Alger

Youth career
- –2011: JS Kabylie

Senior career*
Years	Team	Apps	(Gls)
2011–2014	JS Kabylie	6	(0)
2014–	MC Alger	0	(0)
- * Club domestic league appearances and goals as of 00:00, 9 December 2011 (UTC)

Mohamed Hikem (born April 12, 1992, in Draâ Ben Khedda) is an Algerian football player. He currently plays for MC Alger in the Algerian Ligue Professionnelle 1.

== Club career ==
On October 15, 2011, Hikem made his professional debut for JS Kabylie as a 90th-minute substitute in a league match against AS Khroub. Two weeks later, he made his second appearance for the club, this time as a 73rd-minute substitute against USM El Harrach.
