= Roberson (footballer) =

Brazilian footballer

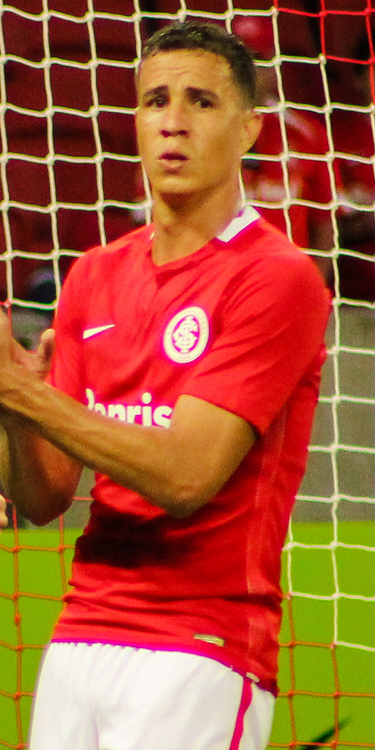

Personal information
- Full name: Roberson de Arruda Alves
- Date of birth: April 2, 1989 (age 37)
- Place of birth: Campo Grande, Brazil
- Height: 1.80 m (5 ft 11 in)
- Position: Second striker

Youth career
- 2003–2006: Camboriuense
- 2006–2008: Grêmio

Senior career*
Years	Team	Apps	(Gls)
2009–2014	Grêmio	29	(2)
2010	→ Juventude (loan)	6	(0)
2011–2012	→ Sport Recife (loan)	18	(6)
2013	→ Avaí (loan)	17	(3)
2014	→ Náutico (loan)	9	(0)
2014	Juventude	5	(0)
2015–2016	MC Alger	4	(0)
2016	Juventude	24	(10)
2017–2018	Internacional	23	(3)
2018	Jeju United	6	(1)
2019	Red Bull Brasil	13	(3)
2019	Red Bull Bragantino	15	(1)
2020	Cruzeiro	11	(1)
2020–2021	Atlético Goianiense	25	(9)
2021	Juventude	14	(1)
2022	Mirassol	8	(1)
2023	Joinville	8	(3)
2023	Confiança	3	(1)
2024	São José	8	(0)

International career
2008	Brazil U19	4	(0)
- * Club domestic league appearances and goals as of 18 December 2023 (UTC)

Roberson de Arruda Alves (born 2 April 1989), simply known as Roberson, is a Brazilian professional footballer who plays as a forward.

== Honours ==
Red Bull Bragantino

- Campeonato Brasileiro Série B: 2019

Atlético Goianiense

- Campeonato Goiano: 2020
