= Ayoub Azzi =

Algerian footballer (born 1989)

Personal information
- Full name: Ayoub Azzi
- Date of birth: 14 September 1989 (age 37)
- Place of birth: Ouargla, Algeria
- Height: 1.83 m (6 ft 0 in)
- Positions: Centre-back; right-back

Youth career
- MC Mekhadma

Senior career*
Years	Team	Apps	(Gls)
2009–2011	MB Hassi Messaoud	-	(-)
2011–2012	MC Mekhadma	-	(-)
2012–2014	USM El Harrach	49	(2)
2014–2020	MC Alger	97	(3)
2020	Umm Salal	13	(2)
2020–2021	Al-Arabi	13	(0)
2021–2023	Al-Markhiya	31	(0)
2023–2024	Al-Najma	5	(0)

International career
2018–	Algeria	1	(0)
- * Club domestic league appearances and goals as of 00:00, 16 July 2015 (EST)

Ayoub Azzi (Arabic: أيوب عزي; born 14 September 1989 in Ouargla) is an Algerian footballer. He plays primarily as a centre-back but has also been used as a right-back.

== Club career ==
In the summer of 2014, Azzi joined MC Alger on a two-year contract.

On 31 July 2023, Azzi joined Saudi Arabian club Al-Najma.

== International career ==
Azzi made his senior debut with the Algeria national football team in a friendly 2–0 loss to Saudi Arabia on 9 May 2018.

== Honours ==
MC Alger

- Algerian Super Cup: 2014
