= Koceila Berchiche =

Algerian footballer (born 1985)

Personal information
- Full name: Koceila Berchiche
- Date of birth: Beni Douala, Algeria
- Place of birth: 5 August 1985 (age 41)
- Position: Midfielder

Team information
- Current team: JSM Béjaïa
- Number: 5

Youth career
- JS Kabylie
- MO Béjaïa
- USM Alger

Senior career*
Years	Team	Apps	(Gls)
2006–2008	WA Rouiba	-	(-)
2008–2011	JS Kabylie	41	(0)
2011–2014	MC El Eulma	86	(4)
2014–2015	MC Alger	30	(2)
2015–2017	JS Kabylie	35	(0)
2017–2018	CA Bordj Bou Arreridj	?	(0)
2018–	JSM Béjaïa	?	(0)

International career^{‡}
2011	Algeria Military	?	(?)
Medal record
Representing Algeria
Men's Football
Gold medal – first place	Rio 2011	Team competition
- * Club domestic league appearances and goals as of 00:00, 14 March 2012 (UTC) ‡ National team caps and goals as of 00:00, 14 March 2012 (UTC)

Koceila Berchiche (born 5 August 1985 in Beni Douala) is an Algerian football player who is currently playing for JSM Béjaïa in the Algerian Ligue Professionnelle 2.

== Club career ==
Berchiche started his career in the junior ranks for JS Kabylie but left to join MO Béjaïa and then USM Alger. His first senior side was WA Rouiba where he played for 2 seasons before joining JS Kabylie in the summer of 2008 on a free transfer.

== International career ==
Berchiche is a member of the Algerian Primary Team.

== Honours ==
- Won the World Military Cup once with the Algerian National Military Team in 2011
