= Samson Mbingui =

Gabonese footballer

Personal information
- Full name: Samson Mbingui
- Date of birth: 9 February 1992 (age 34)
- Place of birth: Moanda, Gabon
- Position: Midfielder

Senior career*
Years	Team	Apps	(Gls)
2011–2014	Mangasport		
2014	MC Alger	9	(0)
2015	MC El Eulma	8	(0)
2015–2017	NA Hussein Dey	18	(0)
2016	Raja Casablanca	8	(2)
2017–2019	Tours	13	(1)

International career^{‡}
2011–2013	Gabon Olympic		
2012–	Gabon	32	(3)
- * Club domestic league appearances and goals as of 1 July 2019 ‡ National team caps and goals as of 10:31, 2 May 2020 (UTC)

Samson Mbingui (born 9 February 1992) is a Gabonese professional footballer who plays for the Gabon national football team.

Mbingui was a member of the Gabon national under-23 football team at the 2011 CAF U-23 Championship and the 2012 Summer Olympics.
