= Alkass Sports Channels =

Qatari sports television network

- Alkass logo
- Country: Qatar
- Headquarters: Doha, Qatar

Programming
- Languages: Arabic, English
- Picture format: 1080p MPEG-4 HDTV

Ownership
- Owner: Government of Qatar

History
- Launched: 6 June 2006; 19 years ago
- Founder: Ali Al Hitmi; Khalid Jassem

Links
- Website: www.alkass.net

Availability

Streaming media
- Alkass Live: Alkass One; Alkass Two; Alkass Four; Alkass Five; Alkass Online

Alkass Sports Channels (Arabic: قنوات الكأس الرياضية) is a group of eleven sports channels that are broadcast 24/7 from Qatar. Its official name is Al Dawri wal Kass (Arabic: الدوري والكأس, lit. 'the league and the cup'), since it was initially launched to broadcast domestic football in Qatar. The eleven channels of Alkass are numbered from one to eleven.

Starting from 2013, five of its ten channels (Al-Kass 6/7/8/9/10) are encrypted with Qatari pay-tv network beIN Channels Network, which are specified to broadcasting matches of AFC Champions League and AFC Cup. Since January 2023, beIN Channels Network introduced 2 new encrypted channels (9/10).

== History ==
Alkass Sports Channels was launched in June 2006 as the second sports channel from Qatar after Al Jazeera Sports. In its first year, the channel won many viewers with its unmatched coverage of domestic sports, especially football. It also broadcast the 2006 Asian Games held in Doha. It now also covers matches involving the Arabian Gulf countries, notably FIFA World Cup qualifying matches, the AFC Asian Cup and the Arabian Gulf Cup. It has emerged as one of the most popular sport channels in Arabia.

Al-Kass has now 11 sports channel, 5 of them are FTA and the other 6 channels are encrypted with the Qatari pay-tv beIN Channels Network.

== Programming ==
=== Football ===
In September 2012, Alkass held the rights to broadcast the Qatar Stars League in English.

==== Football broadcasters ====
Show name	Anchors	Note
Al Majlis	Khalid Jassem	Flagship talk show involving former national players and coaches; previews every match involving Qatar and Qatari clubs.
Fadh Fadh	Jamal Hosni	Fans interaction show where the channel's reporters mingle among the crowd during matches.
QSL Review	Rhodri Williams	Analysts and reviews of Qatar Stars League matches
World Football	Ronald de Boer	Analysts of world football matches.
Jarayed	Huda Mohammed	Fans interaction show where the channel's reporters mingle among the crowd during matches.

== Events ==
Besides broadcasting, the channel has held certain sporting events in its history. A notable event is the Alkass International Cup. It is an under-17 tournament in which the best teams in the world send their youth teams to Qatar to participate in the tournament. Both, Qatar's Aspire International, and Aspire Qatar participated. The main purpose of the tournament is to help develop youth systems worldwide. There are cash prizes for the winners.

== Awards ==
The channel won the Best Persian Gulf Sports Channel award in 2007. Khalid Jassim, the host of the Majlis (The Council) program won the Best Host award.

The channel also won two awards at the PromaxBDA Awards held at New York in June 2008.
