= Toufik Zeghdane =

French footballer (born 1992)

Personal information
- Full name: Toufik Zeghdane
- Date of birth: September 17, 1992 (age 34)
- Place of birth: Revin, France
- Position: Left-back

Team information
- Current team: Atert Bissen
- Number: 39

Youth career
- 2000–2003: Revin Orzy
- 2003–2010: CS Sedan Ardennes

Senior career*
Years	Team	Apps	(Gls)
2012–2013	Sedan	1	(0)
2013–2016	MC Alger	70	(2)
2016–2017	USM Alger	?	(?)
2017–2019	Sedan	8	(0)
2019–2020	JS Kabylie	19	(0)
2020–2021	CA Bordj Bou Arréridj	25	(1)
2022–2024	Swift Hesperange	27	(1)
2024–2025	Olympic Charleroi	29	(3)
2025–	Atert Bissen	22	(1)
- * Club domestic league appearances and goals as of 13 June 2026

Toufik Zeghdane (born September 17, 1992) is a French footballer who plays as a left-back for Atert Bissen.

== Honours ==
=== Club ===
MC Alger

- Algerian Cup (2): 2014, 2016
- Algerian Super Cup (1): 2014

USM Alger

- Algerian Super Cup (1): 2016
