= Sid Ahmed Aouadj =

Algerian footballer (born 1991)

Personal information
- Full name: Sid Ahmed Aouadj
- Date of birth: July 2, 1991 (age 35)
- Place of birth: Oran, Algeria
- Height: 1.75 m (5 ft 9 in)
- Position: Left midfielder

Team information
- Current team: CR Témouchent
- Number: 10

Youth career
- 2005–2009: MC Oran

Senior career*
Years	Team	Apps	(Gls)
2009–2013	MC Oran	67	(13)
2013–2014	JS Kabylie	27	(2)
2014–2017	MC Alger	76	(6)
2018	ES Sétif	11	(1)
2018	JS Saoura	8	(0)
2019	MC Oran	0	(0)
2019–2020	CS Constantine	10	(0)
2020–2021	Dibba Al-Hisn SC		
2021–2022	Al-Kholood	19	(7)
2022	→ Bisha (loan)	16	(3)
2022–2023	Al-Ansar		
2023	Al-Zulfi		
2023–2024	Al-Diriyah	28	(9)
2024–2025	Al-Hada		
2025–	CR Témouchent	7	(2)

International career
2010–2011	Algeria U23	20	(4)
2011	Algeria Military	5	(3)
Medal record
Representing Algeria
World Military Games
Gold medal – first place	2011 Rio
- * Club domestic league appearances and goals as of 14 November 2025

Sid Ahmed Aouadj (Arabic: سيد احمد عواج; born July 2, 1991) is an Algerian footballer who plays as a midfielder for CR Témouchent.

== Club career ==
On May 13, 2010, Aouadj made his professional debut for MC Oran in a league game against WA Tlemcen. He started the game before being subbed off in the 64th minute.

On 5 August 2021, Aouadj joined Saudi Arabian club Al-Kholood.

On 6 July 2023, Aouadj joined Al-Diriyah.

On 8 August 2024, Aouadj joined Al-Hada.

== International career ==
On November 2, 2010, Aouadj was called up to the Algerian Under-23 National Team for a pair of friendlies against Tunisia.

In July 2011, Aouedj was selected as part of Algeria's squad for the 2011 Military World Games in Rio de Janeiro, Brazil. On July 24, 2011, in the final against Egypt, Aouedj scored the only goal of the game in the 16th minute to help Algeria win its first World Military Cup.

On November 16, 2011, he was selected as part of Algeria's squad for the 2011 CAF U-23 Championship in Morocco.

== Honours ==
Algeria Military

- World Military Cup: 2011
