= Amir Karaoui =

Algerian footballer (born 1987)

Personal information
- Date of birth: 3 August 1987 (age 39)
- Place of birth: Amnéville, France
- Height: 1.78 m (5 ft 10 in)
- Position: Midfielder

Team information
- Current team: FC Schifflange 95
- Number: 5

Youth career
- 2000–2005: UL Rombas

Senior career*
Years	Team	Apps	(Gls)
2005–2006	RS Margny		
2007–2008	UL Rombas		
2008	USB Longwy		
2009–2011	MC El Eulma	59	(9)
2011–2014	ES Sétif	70	(7)
2014–2018	MC Alger	95	(4)
2018–2022	ES Sétif	96	(2)
2022–2023	HB Chelghoum Laïd	10	(1)
2023–2023	Al-Washm	0	(0)
2024–	FC Schifflange 95	6	(0)

International career^{‡}
2013	Algeria	1	(0)
- * Club domestic league appearances and goals as of 1 August 2024 ‡ National team caps and goals as of 00:00, 20 June 2015 (EST)

Amir Karaoui (Arabic: أمير القروي; born 3 August 1987) is a professional footballer who plays for Al-Washm. He plays primarily as a defensive midfielder. Born in France, he played for Algeria national team at international level.

== Honours ==
- Algerian Ligue Professionnelle 1: 2011–12, 2012–13
- Algerian Cup: 2011–12
