= Kaled Gourmi =

Algerian footballer (born 1986)

Khaled Gourmi
Personal information
- Full name: Khaled Gourmi
- Date of birth: April 16, 1986 (age 40)
- Place of birth: Paris, France
- Height: 1.74 m (5 ft 8 1/2 in)
- Position: Midfielder

Team information
- Current team: Conflans FC

Youth career
- L'Entente SSG
- Charleroi

Senior career*
| Years | Team | Apps | (Gls) |
| 2006–2007 | Nuorese | | |
| 2007–2008 | Baulmes | 28 | (7) |
| 2008–2011 | Yverdon-Sport | 68 | (15) |
| 2009–2010 | → Young Boys (loan) | 2 | (0) |
| 2011–2014 | ES Sétif | 67 | (10) |
| 2014–2016 | MC Alger | 54 | (14) |
| 2016–2017 | Al-Shahania | 13 | (2) |
| 2017 | MC Alger | 10 | (0) |
| 2017–2018 | Yverdon-Sport | 5 | (0) |
| 2018 | Conflans FC | | |
| 2019 | FC Saint-Leu 95 | 11 | (2) |
| 2020– | Conflans FC | | |

International career
| 2013 | Algeria A' | 1 | (0) |
- * Club domestic league appearances and goals as of 00:00, February 2, 2017 (EST)

Kaled Gourmi, first name sometimes spelt as Khaled, (born April 16, 1986) is an Algerian football player who plays for Régional 2 club Conflans FC.

== Career ==
=== Club career ===
In September 2009, Gourmi was loaned out by FC Baulmes to BSC Young Boys. However, injuries limited him to just two appearances for Young Boys before his loan deal was terminated in February.

On August 19, 2011, Gourmi signed a two-year contract with ES Sétif. He made his debut for the club on September 10, 2011, coming on as a second-half substitute in a league game against NA Hussein Dey. A few weeks later, on October 1, he scored his first goal for Sétif, converting from the penalty spot in a 3–2 loss to USM El Harrach.

After a short spell with FC Saint-Leu 95 in the Championnat National 3, 33-year old Gourmi returned to Régional 2 club Conflans FC in January 2020, the club he also played for in 2018.

== Honours ==
- Won the Algerian Cup once with ES Sétif in 2012
