= Abderahmane Hachoud =

Algerian footballer (born 1988)

Personal information
- Full name: Abderahmane Hachoud
- Date of birth: 2 July 1988 (age 38)
- Place of birth: El Attaf, Algeria
- Height: 1.74 m (5 ft 8 1/2 in)
- Position: Defender

Team information
- Current team: ES Ben Aknoun
- Number: 27

Youth career
- MC Alger

Senior career*
Years	Team	Apps	(Gls)
2006–2007	MC Alger	2	(0)
2007–2010	CA Bordj Bou Arreridj	81	(17)
2010–2012	ES Setif	45	(13)
2012–2022	MC Alger	236	(42)
2022–	ES Ben Aknoun	+120	(20)

International career^{‡}
2010–2011	Algeria A'	6	(0)
2011–2015	Algeria	4	(0)
- * Club domestic league appearances and goals as of 12 October 2026 ‡ National team caps and goals as of 9 October 2015

Abderahmane Hachoud (Arabic: عبد الرحمان حشود; born 2 July 1988) is an Algerian professional football player who plays for ES Ben Aknoun.

== Club career ==
Hachoud began his career as a forward in the junior ranks of MC Alger, and was promoted to the first team ahead of the 2006–07 season.

In 2009, Hachoud was chosen as the Best Young Player of the Algerian League by DZFoot.

=== ES Sétif ===
On 2 June 2010 Hachoud signed a two-year contract with ES Sétif, joining them on a free transfer. On 16 July 2010 he made his official debut for the club as a second-half substitute in a group stage game of the 2010 CAF Champions League against Tunisian side Espérance ST. He went on to play in all 6 of ES Sétif's games in the group stage, starting in 4 of them.

On 13 July 2012 Hachoud joined MC Alger on a free transfer, signing a two-year contract with the club.

== Career statistics ==
=== Club ===
As of match played 7 October 2026

Appearances and goals by club, season and competition
Club	Season	League			National cup		Super Cup		Continental		Other		Total	
Club	Season	Division	Apps	Goals	Apps	Goals	Apps	Goals	Apps	Goals	Apps	Goals	Apps	Goals
MC Alger	2006–07	First Division	2	0	-	-	-	-	—		—		2	0
MC Alger	Total		2	0	0	0	0	0	—		—		2	0
CA Bordj Bou Arreridj	2007–08	First Division	26	7	2	0	-	-	—		—		28	7
CA Bordj Bou Arreridj	2008–09	First Division	28	6	6	3	-	-	—		—		34	8
CA Bordj Bou Arreridj	2009–10	First Division	27	4	3	3	-	-	—		—		30	7
CA Bordj Bou Arreridj	Total		81	17	11	6	0	0	—		—		92	23
ES Sétif	2010–11	Ligue 1	26	5	5	1	-	-	11	2	5	2	47	10
ES Sétif	2011–12	Ligue 1	19	8	5	2	-	-	2	0	—		26	10
ES Sétif	Total		45	13	10	3	0	0	13	2	5	2	73	20
MC Alger	2012–13	Ligue 1	22	0	4	0	-	-	—		—		26	0
MC Alger	2013–14	Ligue 1	27	10	6	2	-	-	—		—		33	12
MC Alger	2014–15	Ligue 1	25	5	1	0	1	0	2	0	—		29	5
MC Alger	2015–16	Ligue 1	27	6	5	2	-	-	—		—		32	8
MC Alger	2016–17	Ligue 1	28	7	4	0	1	0	12	4	—		45	11
MC Alger	2017–18	Ligue 1	27	7	1	0	-	-	9	1	—		37	8
MC Alger	2018–19	Ligue 1	20	1	3	0	-	-	—		6	0	29	1
MC Alger	2019–20	Ligue 1	16	1	2	0	-	-	—		4	0	22	1
MC Alger	2020–21	Ligue 1	28	4	-	-	-	-	11	0	—		39	4
MC Alger	2021–22	Ligue 1	16	1	-	-	-	-	—		—		16	1
MC Alger	Total		236	42	26	4	2	0	34	5	10	0	308	51
ES Ben Aknoun	2022–23	Ligue 2	30	3	1	1	-	-	—		—		31	4
ES Ben Aknoun	2023–24	Ligue 1	30	7	4	1	-	-	—		—		34	8
ES Ben Aknoun	2024–25	Ligue 2	30	4	3	0	-	-	—		—		33	4
ES Ben Aknoun	2025–26	Ligue 1	27	6	3	0	-	-	—		—		30	6
ES Ben Aknoun	2026–27	Ligue 1	3	0	-	-	-	-	—		—		3	0
ES Ben Aknoun	Total		120	20	11	2	0	0	—		—		131	22
Career total			484	92	58	15	2	0	47	7	15	2	606	116

== Honours ==
ES Sétif

- Algerian Cup: 2011–12
- Algerian Ligue Professionnelle 1: 2011–12
