= 2017 CAF Confederation Cup final =

- Event: 2017 CAF Confederation Cup
TP Mazembe	SuperSport United
(Democratic Republic of the Congo)	(South Africa)
2	1
- on aggregate

First leg
TP Mazembe	SuperSport United
2	1
- Date: 19 November 2017
- Venue: Stade TP Mazembe, Lubumbashi
- Referee: Mehdi Abid Charef (Algeria)
- Attendance: 19,000

Second leg
SuperSport United	TP Mazembe
0	0
- Date: 25 November 2017
- Venue: Lucas Masterpieces Moripe Stadium, Pretoria
- Referee: Malang Diedhiou (Senegal)
- Attendance: 15,000

The 2017 CAF Confederation Cup final was the final of the 2017 CAF Confederation Cup, the 14th edition of the CAF Confederation Cup, Africa's secondary club football competition organized by the Confederation of African Football (CAF).

The final was contested in two-legged home-and-away format between TP Mazembe of the Democratic Republic of the Congo and SuperSport United of South Africa. The first leg was hosted by TP Mazembe at the Stade TP Mazembe in Lubumbashi on 19 November 2017, while the second leg was hosted by SuperSport United at the Lucas Masterpieces Moripe Stadium in Pretoria on 25 November 2017. The winner earned the right to play in the 2018 CAF Super Cup against the winner of the 2017 CAF Champions League.

TP Mazembe defeated SuperSport United 2–1 in the first leg, and with the second leg ending in a 0–0 draw, won 2–1 on aggregate to be crowned CAF Confederation Cup champions for the second consecutive year.

== Teams ==
Team	Zone	Previous finals appearances (bold indicates winners)
(Democratic Republic of the Congo) TP Mazembe	UNIFFAC (Central Africa)	2 (2013, **2016**)
(South Africa) SuperSport United	COSAFA (Southern Africa)	None

== Venues ==
Stade TP Mazembe in Lubumbashi, Democratic Republic of the Congo, hosted the first leg, while Lucas Masterpieces Moripe Stadium in Pretoria, South Africa, hosted the second leg.

== Road to the final ==
Note: In all results below, the score of the finalist is given first (H: home; A: away).

(Democratic Republic of the Congo) TP Mazembe				Round	(South Africa) SuperSport United			
Champions League				Qualifying rounds (CL/CC)	Confederation Cup			
Opponent	Agg.	1st leg	2nd leg	Qualifying rounds (CL/CC)	Opponent	Agg.	1st leg	2nd leg
Bye				Preliminary round	(Madagascar) ASSM Elgeco Plus	2–1	0–0 (A)	2–1 (H)
(Zimbabwe) CAPS United	1–1 (a)	1–1 (H)	0–0 (A)	First round	(Sudan) Al-Ahly Shendi	6–3	2–3 (A)	4–0 (H)
Confederation Cup
(Algeria) JS Kabylie	2–0	2–0 (H)	0–0 (A)	Play-off round	(Liberia) Barrack Young Controllers	6–1	1–1 (A)	5–0 (H)
Opponent	Result			Group stage	Opponent	Result		
(Gabon) CF Mounana	2–0 (H)			Matchday 1	(Guinea) Horoya	2–2 (H)		
(Guinea) Horoya	1–1 (A)			Matchday 2	(Gabon) CF Mounana	5–3 (A)		
(South Africa) SuperSport United	2–2 (H)			Matchday 3	(Democratic Republic of the Congo) TP Mazembe	2–2 (A)		
(South Africa) SuperSport United	0–0 (A)			Matchday 4	(Democratic Republic of the Congo) TP Mazembe	0–0 (H)		
(Gabon) CF Mounana	1–0 (A)			Matchday 5	(Guinea) Horoya	0–0 (A)		
(Guinea) Horoya	2–1 (H)			Matchday 6	(Gabon) CF Mounana	4–1 (H)		
**Group D winner**: Pos / Team / Pld / Pts; **1** / (Democratic Republic of the Congo) TP Mazembe / **6** / **12**; 2 / (South Africa) SuperSport United / 6 / **10**; 3 / (Guinea) Horoya / 6 / **9**; 4 / (Gabon) CF Mounana / 6 / **0**; Source: CAF				Final standings	**Group D runner-up**: Pos / Team / Pld / Pts; 1 / (Democratic Republic of the Congo) TP Mazembe / 6 / **12**; **2** / (South Africa) SuperSport United / **6** / **10**; 3 / (Guinea) Horoya / 6 / **9**; 4 / (Gabon) CF Mounana / 6 / **0**; Source: CAF			
Opponent	Agg.	1st leg	2nd leg	Knockout stage	Opponent	Agg.	1st leg	2nd leg
(Sudan) Al-Hilal Al-Ubayyid	7–1	2–1 (A)	5–0 (H)	Quarter-finals	(Zambia) ZESCO United	2–2 (a)	0–0 (H)	2–2 (A)
(Morocco) FUS Rabat	1–0	1–0 (H)	0–0 (A)	Semi-finals	(Tunisia) Club Africain	4–2	1–1 (H)	3–1 (A)

== Format ==
The final was played on a home-and-away two-legged basis, with the order of legs decided by an additional draw held after the group stage draw, which was held on 26 April 2017. If the aggregate score was tied after the second leg, the away goals rule would be applied, and if still tied, extra time would not be played, and the penalty shoot-out would be used to determine the winner (Regulations III. 26 & 27).

== Matches ==
=== First leg ===
19 November 2017
15:30 UTC+2

TP Mazembe (Democratic Republic of the Congo)	2–1	(South Africa) SuperSport United
Traoré 19'; Adjei 67'	Report	Mbule 48'

Stade TP Mazembe, Lubumbashi
Attendance: 19,000
Referee: Mehdi Abid Charef (Algeria)

**TP Mazembe**	**SuperSport United**

GK	21	(Democratic Republic of the Congo) Ley Matampi
RB	5	(Democratic Republic of the Congo) Issama Mpeko
CB	2	(Democratic Republic of the Congo) Joël Kimwaki	(yellow card) 75'
CB	14	(Zambia) Kabaso Chongo
LB	3	(Democratic Republic of the Congo) Jean Kasusula
CM	19	(Ghana) Daniel Nii Adjei		(substituted off) 82'
CM	13	(Zambia) Nathan Sinkala
RW	30	(Republic of the Congo) Chico Ushindi		(substituted off) 61'
AM	18	(Zambia) Rainford Kalaba (c)		(substituted off) 58'
LW	11	(Mali) Adama Traoré
CF	28	(Democratic Republic of the Congo) Ben Malango
Substitutes:
GK	22	(Ivory Coast) Sylvain Gbohouo
DF	4	(Democratic Republic of the Congo) Arsène Zola
DF	15	(Democratic Republic of the Congo) Kévin Mondeko
MF	16	(Ivory Coast) Christian Koffi
MF	20	(Ghana) Solomon Asante		(substituted on) 61'
FW	8	(Democratic Republic of the Congo) Trésor Mputu		(substituted on) 82'
FW	23	(Democratic Republic of the Congo) Elia Meschak		(substituted on) 58'
Manager:
(Democratic Republic of the Congo) Mihayo Kazembe

GK	30	(South Africa) Ronwen Williams
RB	15	(South Africa) Siyabonga Nhlapo
CB	4	(South Africa) Clayton Daniels
CB	2	(South Africa) Tefu Mashamaite
LB	16	(South Africa) Aubrey Modiba
DM	8	(South Africa) Dean Furman (c)
RM	13	(South Africa) Thuso Phala
CM	26	(South Africa) Sipho Mbule
CM	9	(Togo) Dové Womé	(substituted off) 81'
LM	7	(South Africa) Bradley Grobler	(substituted off) 85'
CF	11	(New Zealand) Jeremy Brockie	(substituted off) 73'
Substitutes:
GK	1	(South Africa) Reyaad Pieterse
DF	20	(South Africa) Grant Kekana	(substituted on) 81'
DF	25	(South Africa) Denwin Farmer	(substituted on) 85'
FW	10	(Zimbabwe) Kingston Nkhatha
FW	17	(Zimbabwe) Prince Dube
FW	19	(South Africa) Fagrie Lakay	(substituted on) 73'
Manager:
(South Africa) Eric Tinkler

Assistant referees:
Abdelhak Etchiali (Algeria)
Aboubacar Doumbouya (Guinea)
Fourth official:
Mustapha Ghorbal (Algeria)

=== Second leg ===
25 November 2017
20:15 UTC+2

SuperSport United (South Africa)	0–0	(Democratic Republic of the Congo) TP Mazembe
	Report

Lucas Masterpieces Moripe Stadium, Pretoria
Attendance: 15,000
Referee: Malang Diedhiou (Senegal)

**SuperSport United**	**TP Mazembe**

GK	30	(South Africa) Ronwen Williams
RB	15	(South Africa) Siyabonga Nhlapo		(substituted off) 46'
CB	4	(South Africa) Clayton Daniels
CB	2	(South Africa) Tefu Mashamaite	(yellow card) 71'
LB	16	(South Africa) Aubrey Modiba
RM	26	(South Africa) Sipho Mbule		(substituted off) 81'
CM	8	(South Africa) Dean Furman (c)	(yellow card) 90+1'
CM	6	(South Africa) Reneilwe Letsholonyane
LM	7	(South Africa) Bradley Grobler
CF	11	(New Zealand) Jeremy Brockie		(substituted off) 66'
CF	13	(South Africa) Thuso Phala	(red card) 90'
Substitutes:
GK	1	(South Africa) Reyaad Pieterse
DF	20	(South Africa) Grant Kekana		(substituted on) 46'
DF	25	(South Africa) Denwin Farmer
MF	9	(Togo) Dové Womé		(substituted on) 66'
MF	12	(South Africa) Cole Alexander
FW	10	(Zimbabwe) Kingston Nkhatha		(substituted on) 81'
FW	19	(South Africa) Fagrie Lakay
Manager:
(South Africa) Eric Tinkler

GK	22	(Ivory Coast) Sylvain Gbohouo
RB	5	(Democratic Republic of the Congo) Issama Mpeko	(yellow card) 76'
CB	2	(Democratic Republic of the Congo) Joël Kimwaki
CB	14	(Zambia) Kabaso Chongo	(yellow card) 76' (yellow-red card) 82'
LB	4	(Democratic Republic of the Congo) Arsène Zola
CM	16	(Ivory Coast) Christian Koffi
CM	13	(Zambia) Nathan Sinkala
RW	11	(Mali) Adama Traoré		(substituted off) 74'
AM	19	(Ghana) Daniel Nii Adjei		(substituted off) 64'
LW	18	(Zambia) Rainford Kalaba (c)	(yellow card) 42'	(substituted off) 60'
CF	28	(Democratic Republic of the Congo) Ben Malango
Substitutes:
GK	21	(Democratic Republic of the Congo) Ley Matampi
DF	3	(Democratic Republic of the Congo) Jean Kasusula
DF	15	(Democratic Republic of the Congo) Kévin Mondeko
MF	20	(Ghana) Solomon Asante		(substituted on) 74'
MF	27	(Democratic Republic of the Congo) Miché Mika		(substituted on) 64'
FW	23	(Democratic Republic of the Congo) Elia Meschak		(substituted on) 60'
FW	30	(Republic of the Congo) Chico Ushindi
Manager:
(Democratic Republic of the Congo) Mihayo Kazembe

Assistant referees:
Djibril Camara (Senegal)
El Hadji Malick Samba (Senegal)
Fourth official:
Maguette Ndiaye (Senegal)

== See also ==
- 2017 CAF Champions League Final
- 2018 CAF Super Cup
