= 2017 CAF Confederation Cup group stage =

- Dates: 12 May – 9 July 2017

Tournament statistics
- Matches played: 48
- Goals scored: 122 (2.54 per match)

The 2017 CAF Confederation Cup group stage was played from 12 May to 9 July 2017. A total of 16 teams competed in the group stage to decide the eight places in the knockout stage of the 2017 CAF Confederation Cup.

== Draw ==
The draw for the group stage was held on 26 April 2017, 14:00 EET (UTC+2), at the CAF Headquarters in Cairo, Egypt. The 16 teams, all winners of the play-off round of qualifying, were drawn into four groups of four. The teams were seeded by their performances in the CAF competitions for the previous five seasons (CAF 5-year ranking points shown in parentheses).

Pot	Pot 1	Pot 2
Teams	(Democratic Republic of the Congo) TP Mazembe (58 pts); (Tunisia) CS Sfaxien (21 pts); (Zambia) ZESCO United (15 pts); (Morocco) FUS Rabat (12 pts)	(Egypt) Smouha (4 pts); (Angola) Recreativo do Libolo (2 pts); (Algeria) MC Alger; (Gabon) CF Mounana; (Guinea) Horoya; (Nigeria) Rivers United; (South Africa) Platinum Stars; (South Africa) SuperSport United; (Sudan) El-Hilal El-Obeid; (Eswatini) Mbabane Swallows; (Tunisia) Club Africain; (Uganda) KCCA

== Format ==
In the group stage, each group was played on a home-and-away round-robin basis. The winners and runners-up of each group advanced to the quarter-finals of the knockout stage.

=== Tiebreakers ===
The teams were ranked according to points (3 points for a win, 1 point for a draw, 0 points for a loss). If tied on points, tiebreakers were applied in the following order (Regulations III. 20 & 21):

1. Points in head-to-head matches among tied teams;
2. Goal difference in head-to-head matches among tied teams;
3. Goals scored in head-to-head matches among tied teams;
4. Away goals scored in head-to-head matches among tied teams;
5. If more than two teams are tied, and after applying all head-to-head criteria above, a subset of teams are still tied, all head-to-head criteria above are reapplied exclusively to this subset of teams;
6. Goal difference in all group matches;
7. Goals scored in all group matches;
8. Away goals scored in all group matches;
9. Drawing of lots.

== Schedule ==
The schedule of each matchday was as follows (matches scheduled in midweek in italics).

Matchday	Dates	Matches
Matchday 1	12–14 May 2017	Team 1 vs. Team 4, Team 2 vs. Team 3
Matchday 2	23–24 May 2017	Team 3 vs. Team 1, Team 4 vs. Team 2
Matchday 3	2–4 June 2017	Team 4 vs. Team 3, Team 1 vs. Team 2
Matchday 4	20–21 June 2017	Team 3 vs. Team 4, Team 2 vs. Team 1
Matchday 5	30 June – 2 July 2017	Team 4 vs. Team 1, Team 3 vs. Team 2
Matchday 6	7–9 July 2017	Team 1 vs. Team 3, Team 2 vs. Team 4

== Groups ==
=== Group A ===
Pos	Team	Pld	W	D	L	GF	GA	GD	Pts	Qualification	CAF	FUS	KCC	RIV
1	(Tunisia) Club Africain	6	4	0	2	13	6	+7	12	Quarter-finals	—	2–1	4–0	3–1
2	(Morocco) FUS Rabat	6	3	0	3	9	8	+1	9 (Note: Head-to-head results: FUS Rabat 3–0 KCCA, KCCA 3–1 FUS Rabat.)	Quarter-finals	2–1	—	3–0	2–1
3	(Uganda) KCCA	6	3	0	3	8	12	−4	9		2–1	3–1	—	2–1
4	(Nigeria) Rivers United	6	2	0	4	6	10	−4	6		0–2	1–0	2–1	—

Source: CAF
Rules for classification: Group stage tiebreakers
Notes:
13 May 2017
22:00 UTC+1

FUS Rabat (Morocco)	3–0	(Uganda) KCCA
El Bahri 7'; Njie 42'; Benarif 76'	Report

Stade de FUS, Rabat
Referee: Bienvenu Sinko (Ivory Coast)
14 May 2017
18:00 UTC+1

Club Africain (Tunisia)	3–1	(Nigeria) Rivers United
Ifa 22'; Darragi 45' (pen.); Douhadji 71' (o.g.)	Report	Odumegwu 53'

Stade Olympique de Radès, Tunis
Referee: Sékou Ahmed Touré (Guinea)

23 May 2017
16:00 UTC+3

KCCA (Uganda)	2–1	(Tunisia) Club Africain
Nsibambi 45+1'; Masiko 63'	Report	Belkhiter 19'

Phillip Omondi Stadium, Kampala
Referee: Ahmad Imtehaz Heeralall (Mauritius)
24 May 2017
16:00 UTC+1

Rivers United (Nigeria)	1–0	(Morocco) FUS Rabat
Atuloma 71'	Report

Yakubu Gowon Stadium, Port Harcourt
Referee: Jean Claude Ishimwe (Rwanda)

2 June 2017
22:00 UTC+0

FUS Rabat (Morocco)	2–1	(Tunisia) Club Africain
Fouzair 53' (pen.); Skouma 90'	Report	Chenihi 19'

Stade de FUS, Rabat
Referee: Mahmoud Bassiouny (Egypt)
3 June 2017
16:00 UTC+3

KCCA (Uganda)	2–1	(Nigeria) Rivers United
Nsibambi 16', 71'	Report	Sakin 33'

Phillip Omondi Stadium, Kampala
Referee: Hassan Mohamed Hagi (Somalia)

20 June 2017
16:00 UTC+1

Rivers United (Nigeria)	2–1	(Uganda) KCCA
Ovoke 1'; Obomate 14'	Report	Sserunkuma 44'

Yakubu Gowon Stadium, Port Harcourt
Referee: Juste Ephrem Zio (Burkina Faso)
20 June 2017
22:00 UTC+1

Club Africain (Tunisia)	2–1	(Morocco) FUS Rabat
Abdi 69'; Meniaoui 90+4'	Report	Fouzair 33' (pen.)

Stade Olympique de Radès, Tunis
Referee: Mustapha Ghorbal (Algeria)

2 July 2017
16:00 UTC+3

KCCA (Uganda)	3–1	(Morocco) FUS Rabat
Sserunkuma 42' (pen.); Saddam 53'; Muleme 62'	Report	Diakité 85'

Phillip Omondi Stadium, Kampala
Referee: Norman Matemera (Zimbabwe)
2 July 2017
16:00 UTC+1

Rivers United (Nigeria)	0–2	(Tunisia) Club Africain
	Report	Haddad 64'; Festus 88' (o.g.)

Yakubu Gowon Stadium, Port Harcourt
Referee: Pacifique Ndabihawenimana (Burundi)

7 July 2017
21:00 UTC+1

FUS Rabat (Morocco)	2–1	(Nigeria) Rivers United
El Gnaoui 52'; Fouzair 89' (pen.)	Report	Sakin 43'

Stade de FUS, Rabat
Referee: Jackson Pavaza (Namibia)
7 July 2017
21:00 UTC+1

Club Africain (Tunisia)	4–0	(Uganda) KCCA
Khalifa 11'; Haddad 24', 89'; Zemzemi 41'	Report

Stade Olympique de Radès, Tunis
Referee: Wellington Kaoma (Zambia)

=== Group B ===
Pos	Team	Pld	W	D	L	GF	GA	GD	Pts	Qualification	CSS	MCA	MBS	PST
1	(Tunisia) CS Sfaxien	6	4	1	1	13	4	+9	13	Quarter-finals	—	4–0	1–0	3–0
2	(Algeria) MC Alger	6	3	2	1	7	7	0	11	Quarter-finals	2–1	—	2–1	2–0
3	(Eswatini) Mbabane Swallows	6	1	2	3	8	10	−2	5		1–3	0–0	—	4–2
4	(South Africa) Platinum Stars	6	0	3	3	6	13	−7	3		1–1	1–1	2–2	—

Source: CAF
Rules for classification: Group stage tiebreakers
13 May 2017
20:00 UTC+1

CS Sfaxien (Tunisia)	1–0	(Eswatini) Mbabane Swallows
Marzouki 30'	Report

Stade Taïeb Mhiri, Sfax
Referee: Issa Sy (Senegal)
14 May 2017
17:00 UTC+2

Platinum Stars (South Africa)	1–1	(Algeria) MC Alger
Khunou 43'	Report	Boudebouda 6'

Royal Bafokeng Stadium, Rustenburg
Referee: Peter Waweru (Kenya)

23 May 2017
15:00 UTC+2

Mbabane Swallows (Eswatini)	4–2	(South Africa) Platinum Stars
Ndzinisa 4', 7', 63', 77'	Report	Shilongo 21' (pen.), 90' (pen.)

Somhlolo National Stadium, Lobamba
Referee: Norman Matemera (Zimbabwe)
23 May 2017
21:00 UTC+1

MC Alger (Algeria)	2–1	(Tunisia) CS Sfaxien
Nekkache 26'; Hachoud 66'	Report	Aouadhi 41'

Stade du 5 Juillet, Algiers
Referee: Mahmoud El Banna (Egypt)

2 June 2017
15:00 UTC+2

Mbabane Swallows (Eswatini)	0–0	(Algeria) MC Alger
	Report

Somhlolo National Stadium, Lobamba
Referee: Israel Mujuni (Tanzania)
4 June 2017
22:00 UTC+1

CS Sfaxien (Tunisia)	3–0	(South Africa) Platinum Stars
Sokari 12'; Aouadhi 27' (pen.); Hannachi 53'	Report

Stade Taïeb Mhiri, Sfax
Referee: Mahmood Ali Mahmood Ismail (Sudan)

20 June 2017
23:00 UTC+1

MC Alger (Algeria)	2–1	(Eswatini) Mbabane Swallows
Nekkache 4', 28'	Report	Ndlovu 73'

Stade du 5 Juillet, Algiers
Referee: Mahamadou Keita (Mali)
21 June 2017
19:00 UTC+2

Platinum Stars (South Africa)	1–1	(Tunisia) CS Sfaxien
Ntuli 58'	Report	Hannachi 76'

Royal Bafokeng Stadium, Rustenburg
Referee: Antoine Effa (Cameroon)

30 June 2017
21:00 UTC+1

MC Alger (Algeria)	2–0	(South Africa) Platinum Stars
Hachoud 12' (pen.); Nekkache 89'	Report

Stade du 5 Juillet, Algiers
Referee: Juste Ephrem Zio (Burkina Faso)
2 July 2017
15:00 UTC+2

Mbabane Swallows (Eswatini)	1–3	(Tunisia) CS Sfaxien
Tshishimbi 44'	Report	Ben Ali 21'; Chaouat 29'; Karoui 88'

Somhlolo National Stadium, Lobamba
Referee: Parmendra Nunkoo (Mauritius)

8 July 2017
18:00 UTC+1

CS Sfaxien (Tunisia)	4–0	(Algeria) MC Alger
Chaouat 2', 88'; Amdouni 90+4'; Marzouki 90+5'	Report

Stade Taïeb Mhiri, Sfax
Referee: Denis Batte (Uganda)
8 July 2017
19:00 UTC+2

Platinum Stars (South Africa)	2–2	(Eswatini) Mbabane Swallows
Ng'ambi 79', 85'	Report	Nhleko 20'; Ndzinisa 69'

Moruleng Stadium, Saulspoort
Referee: Mahmood Ali Mahmood Ismail (Sudan)

=== Group C ===
Pos	Team	Pld	W	D	L	GF	GA	GD	Pts	Qualification	ZES	HLU	RLB	SMO
1	(Zambia) ZESCO United	6	3	1	2	6	5	+1	10 (Note: Head-to-head results: Al-Hilal Al-Ubayyid 1–0 ZESCO United, ZESCO United 3–0 Al-Hilal Al-Ubayyid.)	Quarter-finals	—	3–0 (awd.) (Note: FIFA suspended the Sudan Football Association on 7 July 2017. As a result, Al-Hilal Al-Ubayyid could not play their final group match against ZESCO United, and the match was awarded as a 3–0 win to their opponents. Initially, Al-Hilal Al-Ubayyid were disqualified from the CAF Confederation Cup, but following the lifting of the suspension on 13 July, they were reinstated to the competition, and advanced to the knockout stage instead of Recreativo do Libolo.)	1–0	1–0
2	(Sudan) Al-Hilal Al-Ubayyid	6	3	1	2	6	6	0	10	Quarter-finals	1–0	—	2–0	2–1
3	(Angola) Recreativo do Libolo	6	2	1	3	4	5	−1	7		3–0	1–0	—	0–0
4	(Egypt) Smouha	6	1	3	2	5	5	0	6		1–1	1–1	2–0	—

Source: CAF
Rules for classification: Group stage tiebreakers
Notes:
13 May 2017
15:30 UTC+2

ZESCO United (Zambia)	1–0	(Egypt) Smouha
Were 73' (pen.)	Report

Levy Mwanawasa Stadium, Ndola
Referee: Cecil Fleischer (Ghana)
14 May 2017
15:00 UTC+1

Recreativo do Libolo (Angola)	1–0	(Sudan) El-Hilal El-Obeid
Diawara 90'	Report

Estádio Municipal de Calulo, Calulo
Referee: Aurélien Juenkou (Cameroon)

24 May 2017
18:00 UTC+2

Smouha (Egypt)	2–0	(Angola) Recreativo do Libolo
Raouf 11'; Mohareb 90'	Report

Borg El Arab Stadium, Alexandria
Referee: Mahamadou Keita (Mali)
24 May 2017
21:00 UTC+3

El-Hilal El-Obeid (Sudan)	1–0	(Zambia) ZESCO United
Moukoro 86'	Report

El-Obeid Stadium, El-Obeid
Referee: Sadok Selmi (Tunisia)

3 June 2017
23:00 UTC+2

Smouha (Egypt)	1–1	(Sudan) El-Hilal El-Obeid
Mekky 38' (pen.)	Report	Ezzat 67' (o.g.)

Borg El Arab Stadium, Alexandria
Referee: Rédouane Jiyed (Morocco)
4 June 2017
15:00 UTC+2

ZESCO United (Zambia)	1–0	(Angola) Recreativo do Libolo
Mbombo 27'	Report

Levy Mwanawasa Stadium, Ndola
Referee: Jackson Pavaza (Namibia)

20 June 2017
15:00 UTC+1

Recreativo do Libolo (Angola)	3–0	(Zambia) ZESCO United
Boukama-Kaya 9', 77'; Fabrício 80' (pen.)	Report

Estádio Municipal de Calulo, Calulo
Referee: Jean-Jacques Ndala Ngambo (DR Congo)
20 June 2017
23:00 UTC+3

El-Hilal El-Obeid (Sudan)	2–1	(Egypt) Smouha
Girfa 72'; Ladzagla 90+3'	Report	Mohareb 84'

El-Obeid Stadium, El-Obeid
Referee: Abou Coulibaly (Ivory Coast)

30 June 2017
18:00 UTC+2

Smouha (Egypt)	1–1	(Zambia) ZESCO United
Diawara 89' (pen.)	Report	Ibrahim 84' (o.g.)

Borg El Arab Stadium, Alexandria
Referee: Louis Hakizimana (Rwanda)
1 July 2017
21:00 UTC+3

El-Hilal El-Obeid (Sudan)	2–0	(Angola) Recreativo do Libolo
El Tahir 21' (pen.); Moukoro 50' (pen.)	Report

El-Obeid Stadium, El-Obeid
Referee: Lotfi Bekouassa (Algeria)

9 July 2017
16:00 UTC+2

ZESCO United (Zambia)	3–0 Awarded	(Sudan) El-Hilal El-Obeid
	Report

Levy Mwanawasa Stadium, Ndola
Referee: Djamal Aden (Djibouti)
9 July 2017
15:00 UTC+1

Recreativo do Libolo (Angola)	0–0	(Egypt) Smouha
	Report

Estádio Municipal de Calulo, Calulo
Referee: William Agbovi (Ghana)

=== Group D ===
Pos	Team	Pld	W	D	L	GF	GA	GD	Pts	Qualification	TPM	SSU	HOR	MOU
1	(Democratic Republic of the Congo) TP Mazembe	6	3	3	0	8	4	+4	12	Quarter-finals	—	2–2	2–1	2–0
2	(South Africa) SuperSport United	6	2	4	0	13	8	+5	10	Quarter-finals	0–0	—	2–2	4–1
3	(Guinea) Horoya	6	2	3	1	6	5	+1	9		1–1	0–0	—	1–0
4	(Gabon) CF Mounana	6	0	0	6	4	14	−10	0		0–1	3–5	0–1	—

Source: CAF
Rules for classification: Group stage tiebreakers
12 May 2017
19:40 UTC+2

SuperSport United (South Africa)	2–2	(Guinea) Horoya
Ritchie 38'; Phala 82'	Report	Dipita 33'; Kyei 51'

Lucas Masterpieces Moripe Stadium, Pretoria
Referee: Denis Batte (Uganda)
14 May 2017
15:30 UTC+2

TP Mazembe (Democratic Republic of the Congo)	2–0	(Gabon) CF Mounana
Mputu 17'; Kalaba 49'	Report

Stade TP Mazembe, Lubumbashi
Referee: Jackson Pavaza (Namibia)

23 May 2017
16:00 UTC+1

CF Mounana (Gabon)	3–5	(South Africa) SuperSport United
Atchabao 26'; Sinayoko 79'; Autchanga 90'	Report	Kekana 4'; Mnyamane 34', 41'; Brockie 64', 90'

Stade de l'Amitié Sino-Gabonaise, Libreville
Referee: Abubakar Ago (Nigeria)
24 May 2017
16:00 UTC+0

Horoya (Guinea)	1–1	(Democratic Republic of the Congo) TP Mazembe
Dipita 33'	Report	Malango 80'

Stade du 28 Septembre, Conakry
Referee: Lahlou Benbraham (Algeria)

3 June 2017
15:30 UTC+1

CF Mounana (Gabon)	0–1	(Guinea) Horoya
	Report	Camara 72'

Stade de l'Amitié Sino-Gabonaise, Libreville
Referee: Djamal Aden (Djibouti)
4 June 2017
15:30 UTC+2

TP Mazembe (Democratic Republic of the Congo)	2–2	(South Africa) SuperSport United
Malango 21'; Kalaba 25'	Report	Modiba 26'; Mokoena 65'

Stade TP Mazembe, Lubumbashi
Referee: Ferdinand Udoh (Nigeria)

20 June 2017
16:00 UTC+0

Horoya (Guinea)	1–0	(Gabon) CF Mounana
Camara 82'	Report

Stade du 28 Septembre, Conakry
Referee: Daniel Laryea (Ghana)
20 June 2017
19:00 UTC+2

SuperSport United (South Africa)	0–0	(Democratic Republic of the Congo) TP Mazembe
	Report

Lucas Masterpieces Moripe Stadium, Pretoria
Referee: Wisdom Chewe (Zambia)

1 July 2017
15:00 UTC+0

Horoya (Guinea)	0–0	(South Africa) SuperSport United
	Report

Stade du 28 Septembre, Conakry
Referee: Mahmoud Bassiouny (Egypt)
2 July 2017
16:00 UTC+1

CF Mounana (Gabon)	0–1	(Democratic Republic of the Congo) TP Mazembe
	Report	Mpeko 78'

Stade de l'Amitié Sino-Gabonaise, Libreville
Referee: Rédouane Jiyed (Morocco)

8 July 2017
15:30 UTC+2

TP Mazembe (Democratic Republic of the Congo)	2–1	(Guinea) Horoya
Kanda 14'; Sinkala 82'	Report	Dipita 37'

Stade TP Mazembe, Lubumbashi
Referee: Sadok Selmi (Tunisia)
8 July 2017
15:30 UTC+2

SuperSport United (South Africa)	4–1	(Gabon) CF Mounana
Grobler 14'; Mnyamane 27'; Brockie 34', 44' (pen.)	Report	Mensah 56'

Lucas Masterpieces Moripe Stadium, Pretoria
Referee: Hassan Mohamed Hagi (Somalia)
