= 2017 CAF Confederation Cup knockout stage =

The 2017 CAF Confederation Cup knockout stage was played from 8 September to 25 November 2017. A total of eight teams competed in the knockout stage to decide the champions of the 2017 CAF Confederation Cup.

== Qualified teams ==
The winners and runners-up of each of the four groups in the group stage advanced to the quarter-finals.

| Group | Winners | Runners-up |
|---|---|---|
| A | (Tunisia) Club Africain | (Morocco) FUS Rabat |
| B | (Tunisia) CS Sfaxien | (Algeria) MC Alger |
| C | (Zambia) ZESCO United | (Sudan) Al-Hilal Al-Ubayyid |
| D | (Democratic Republic of the Congo) TP Mazembe | (South Africa) SuperSport United |

== Format ==
In the knockout stage, the eight teams played a single-elimination tournament. Each tie was played on a home-and-away two-legged basis. If the aggregate score was tied after the second leg, the away goals rule would be applied, and if still tied, extra time would not be played, and the penalty shoot-out would be used to determine the winner (Regulations III. 26 & 27).

== Schedule ==
The schedule of each round was as follows.

| Round | First leg | Second leg |
|---|---|---|
| Quarter-finals | 15–17 September 2017 | 22–24 September 2017 |
| Semi-finals | 29 September – 1 October 2017 | 20–22 October 2017 |
| Final | 17–19 November 2017 | 24–26 November 2017 |

The calendar was amended from the original one for the following dates:

- Quarter-finals first leg: moved from 8–10 September to 15–17 September
- Quarter-finals second leg: moved from 15–17 September to 22–24 September
- Semi-finals second leg: moved from 13–15 October to 20–22 October

== Bracket ==
The bracket of the knockout stage was determined as follows:

| Round | Matchups |
|---|---|
| Quarter-finals | (Group winners host second leg): QF1: Runner-up Group B vs. Winner Group A; QF2: Runner-up Group D vs. Winner Group C; QF3: Runner-up Group A vs. Winner Group B; QF4: Runner-up Group C vs. Winner Group D |
| Semi-finals | (Order of legs decided by draw): SF1: Winner QF1 vs. Winner QF2; SF2: Winner QF3 vs. Winner QF4 |
| Final | (Order of legs decided by draw): Winner SF1 vs. Winner SF2 |

The order of legs for the semi-finals and final was decided by an additional draw held after the group stage draw on 26 April 2017, 14:00 EET (UTC+2), at the CAF Headquarters in Cairo, Egypt.

Quarter-finals
(Sudan) Al-Hilal Al-Ubayyid | 1 | 0 | 1
(Democratic Republic of the Congo) TP Mazembe | 2 | 5 | 7
(Morocco) FUS Rabat | 1 | 0 | 1 (5 p)
(Tunisia) CS Sfaxien | 0 | 1 | 1 (4 p)
(South Africa) SuperSport United | 0 | 2 | 2 (a)
(Zambia) ZESCO United | 0 | 2 | 2
(Algeria) MC Alger | 1 | 0 | 1
(Tunisia) Club Africain | 0 | 2 | 2

Semi-finals
(Democratic Republic of the Congo) TP Mazembe | 1 | 0 | 1
(Morocco) FUS Rabat | 0 | 0 | 0
(South Africa) SuperSport United | 1 | 3 | 4
(Tunisia) Club Africain | 1 | 1 | 2

Final
(Democratic Republic of the Congo) TP Mazembe | 2 | 0 | 2
(South Africa) SuperSport United | 1 | 0 | 1

== Quarter-finals ==
In the quarter-finals, the winners of one group played the runners-up of another group, with the group winners hosting the second leg.

| Team 1 | Agg. | Team 2 | 1st leg | 2nd leg |
|---|---|---|---|---|
| MC Alger (Algeria) | 1–2 | (Tunisia) Club Africain | 1−0 | 0–2 |
| SuperSport United (South Africa) | 2–2 (a) | (Zambia) ZESCO United | 0−0 | 2–2 |
| FUS Rabat (Morocco) | 1–1 (5–4 p) | (Tunisia) CS Sfaxien | 1−0 | 0−1 |
| Al-Hilal Al-Ubayyid (Sudan) | 1–7 | (Democratic Republic of the Congo) TP Mazembe | 1−2 | 0–5 |

16 September 2017
20:45 UTC+1

| MC Alger (Algeria) | 1−0 | (Tunisia) Club Africain |
|---|---|---|
| Nekkache 9' | Report |

Stade du 5 Juillet, Algiers
Referee: Noureddine El Jaafari (Morocco)
24 September 2017
19:00 UTC+1

| Club Africain (Tunisia) | 2–0 | (Algeria) MC Alger |
|---|---|---|
| Zemzemi 21' (pen.); Khalifa 82' | Report |

Stade Olympique de Radès, Tunis
Referee: Thierry Nkurunziza (Burundi)

Club Africain won 2–1 on aggregate.

15 September 2017
19:00 UTC+2

| SuperSport United (South Africa) | 0−0 | (Zambia) ZESCO United |
|---|---|---|
| | Report |

Lucas Masterpieces Moripe Stadium, Pretoria
Referee: Eric Otogo-Castane (Gabon)
23 September 2017
15:00 UTC+2

| ZESCO United (Zambia) | 2–2 | (South Africa) SuperSport United |
|---|---|---|
| Ching'andu 4'; Owino 51' | Report | Phala 34', 90' |

Levy Mwanawasa Stadium, Ndola
Referee: Denis Dembélé (Ivory Coast)

2–2 on aggregate. SuperSport United won on away goals.

16 September 2017
20:30 UTC+1

| FUS Rabat (Morocco) | 1−0 | (Tunisia) CS Sfaxien |
|---|---|---|
| Benarif 19' (pen.) | Report |

Stade de FUS, Rabat
Referee: Daniel Bennett (South Africa)
22 September 2017
19:00 UTC+1

| CS Sfaxien (Tunisia) | 1−0 | (Morocco) FUS Rabat |
|---|---|---|
| Aouadhi 22' (pen.) | Report |
Penalties
| Aouadhi (penalty missed); Meriah (penalty scored); Mathlouthi (penalty scored); Marzouki (penalty scored); Amdouni (penalty scored) | 4–5 | (penalty scored) Boulahroud; (penalty scored) Diakité; (penalty scored) El Bassil; (penalty scored) Belmaachi; (penalty scored) Saoud |

Stade Taïeb Mhiri, Sfax
Referee: Davies Omweno (Kenya)

1–1 on aggregate. FUS Rabat won 5–4 on penalties.

16 September 2017
20:00 UTC+3

| Al-Hilal Al-Ubayyid (Sudan) | 1−2 | (Democratic Republic of the Congo) TP Mazembe |
|---|---|---|
| Mondeko 22' (o.g.) | Report | Malango 29', 82' (pen.) |

Al-Ubayyid Stadium, Al-Ubayyid
Referee: Victor Gomes (South Africa)
24 September 2017
15:30 UTC+2

| TP Mazembe (Democratic Republic of the Congo) | 5–0 | (Sudan) Al-Hilal Al-Ubayyid |
|---|---|---|
| Kasusula 39'; Traoré 48'; Malango 54'; Meschak 83'; Mpeko 90+3' | Report |

Stade TP Mazembe, Lubumbashi
Referee: Gehad Grisha (Egypt)

TP Mazembe won 7–1 on aggregate.

== Semi-finals ==
In the semi-finals, the four quarter-final winners played in two ties, with the order of legs decided by an additional draw held after the group stage draw.

| Team 1 | Agg. | Team 2 | 1st leg | 2nd leg |
|---|---|---|---|---|
| SuperSport United (South Africa) | 4−2 | (Tunisia) Club Africain | 1−1 | 3−1 |
| TP Mazembe (Democratic Republic of the Congo) | 1−0 | (Morocco) FUS Rabat | 1−0 | 0−0 |

1 October 2017 (Note: The kickoff of SuperSport United v Club Africain match was delayed by 24 hours from 30 September to 1 October due to travel issues of Club Africain.)
15:00 UTC+2

| SuperSport United (South Africa) | 1−1 | (Tunisia) Club Africain |
|---|---|---|
| Mnyamane 88' | Report | Khalifa 21' (pen.) |

Lucas Masterpieces Moripe Stadium, Pretoria
Referee: Bernard Camille (Seychelles)
22 October 2017
19:00 UTC+1

| Club Africain (Tunisia) | 1−3 | (South Africa) SuperSport United |
|---|---|---|
| Khalifa 56' (pen.) | Report | Grobler 16', 64'; Brockie 53' |

Stade Olympique de Radès, Tunis
Referee: Gehad Grisha (Egypt)

SuperSport United won 4–2 on aggregate.

1 October 2017
15:30 UTC+2

| TP Mazembe (Democratic Republic of the Congo) | 1−0 | (Morocco) FUS Rabat |
|---|---|---|
| Malango 14' | Report |

Stade TP Mazembe, Lubumbashi
Referee: Bakary Gassama (Gambia)
21 October 2017
21:30 UTC+1

| FUS Rabat (Morocco) | 0−0 | (Democratic Republic of the Congo) TP Mazembe |
|---|---|---|
| | Report |

Stade de FUS, Rabat
Referee: Janny Sikazwe (Zambia)

TP Mazembe won 1–0 on aggregate.

== Final ==
In the final, the two semi-final winners played each other, with the order of legs decided by an additional draw held after the group stage draw.

19 November 2017
15:30 UTC+2

| TP Mazembe (Democratic Republic of the Congo) | 2–1 | (South Africa) SuperSport United |
|---|---|---|
| Traoré 19'; Adjei 67' | Report | Mbule 48' |

Stade TP Mazembe, Lubumbashi
Attendance: 19,000
Referee: Mehdi Abid Charef (Algeria)
25 November 2017
20:15 UTC+2

| SuperSport United (South Africa) | 0–0 | (Democratic Republic of the Congo) TP Mazembe |
|---|---|---|
| | Report |

Lucas Masterpieces Moripe Stadium, Pretoria
Attendance: 15,000
Referee: Malang Diedhiou (Senegal)

TP Mazembe won 2–1 on aggregate.
