= 2016–17 MC Alger season =

MC Alger
2016–17 season
- Chairman: Omar Gharib
- Head coach: Djamel Menad (until 1 November 2016); Kamel Mouassa (from 2 November 2016)
- Stadium: Stade Omar Hamadi, Algiers
- Ligue 1: Runners–up
- Algerian Cup: Semi-finals
- Confederation Cup: Group stage
- Super Cup: Runners–up
- Top goalscorer: League: Abderahmane Hachoud (7); Hichem Nekkache (7); All: Hichem Nekkache (10)

In the 2016–17 season, MC Alger competed in the Ligue 1 for the 46th season, as well as the Algerian Cup, Super Cup and the Confederation Cup.

== Squad list ==
Players and squad numbers last updated on 6 August 2009.
Note: Flags indicate national team as has been defined under FIFA eligibility rules. Players may hold more than one non-FIFA nationality.

No.	Name	Nat.	Position	Date of Birth (Age)	Signed from
Goalkeepers
Defenders
Midfielders
Forwards

== Pre-season ==
12 July 2016 Friendly match	MC Alger (Algeria)	0–1	(Ukraine) Karpaty Lviv	Wisła, Poland
16:00 CEST (UTC+2)		Report	Verbnyi 65'

14 July 2016 Friendly match	MC Alger (Algeria)	–	(Poland) Górnik Łęczna	Wisła, Poland
00:00 CEST (UTC+2)

16 July 2016 Friendly match	MC Alger (Algeria)	1–0	(Poland) Stal Mielec	Wisła, Poland
00:00 CEST (UTC+2)	38' (o.g.)	Report

19 July 2016 Friendly match	MC Alger (Algeria)	1–0	(Poland) GKS Katowice	Wisła, Poland
00:00 CEST (UTC+2)	Seguer 88'	Report

25 July 2016 Friendly match	MC Alger (Algeria)	3–0	(Poland) Piast Gliwice	Wisła, Poland
00:00 CEST (UTC+2)	Zerdab 55'; Bouguèche 70'; Hachoud 77'

== Competitions ==
=== Overview ===
Competition	Record								Started round	Final position / round	First match	Last match
Competition	G	W	D	L	GF	GA	GD	Win %	Started round	Final position / round	First match	Last match
Ligue 1	30	14	8	8	38	27	+11	46.67	—N/a	Runners–up	20 August 2016	14 June 2017
Algerian Cup	5	3	1	1	13	6	+7	60.00	Round of 64	Semi-finals	26 November 2016	24 June 2017
Algerian Super Cup	1	0	0	1	0	2	−2	0.00	Final	Runners–up	1 November 2016	
Confederation Cup	10	5	2	3	17	9	+8	50.00	Preliminary round	Group stage	12 February 2017	20 June 2017
Total	46	22	11	13	68	44	+24	47.83				

== League table ==
Pos	Team	Pld	W	D	L	GF	GA	GD	Pts	Qualification or relegation
1	ES Sétif (C)	30	17	6	7	42	23	+19	57	Qualification for the 2018 CAF Champions League
2	MC Alger	30	14	8	8	38	27	+11	50 (Note: MC Alger ahead of USM Alger on head-to-head record: MCA–UAL 2–1, UAL–MCA 2–2.)	Qualification for the 2018 CAF Champions League
3	USM Alger	30	14	8	8	50	31	+19	50	Qualification for the 2018 CAF Confederation Cup
4	USM Bel-Abbès	30	14	6	10	37	33	+4	48	
5	JS Saoura	30	12	9	9	34	30	+4	45	

Updated to match(es) played on 14 June 2017. Source: DZFoot
Rules for classification: 1) points; 2) head-to-head points; 3) head-to-head goal difference; 4) goal difference; 5) total goals; 6) fairplay ranking; 7) playoff.
(C) Champions

=== Results summary ===
Overall								Home						Away					
Pld	W	D	L	GF	GA	GD	Pts	W	D	L	GF	GA	GD	W	D	L	GF	GA	GD
30	14	8	8	38	27	+11	50	10	3	2	25	10	+15	4	5	6	13	17	−4

Last updated: 22 December 2016.
Source: Competitive matches

=== Results by round ===
Round	1	2	3	4	5	6	7	8	9	10	11	12	13	14	15	16	17	18	19	20	21	22	23	24	25	26	27	28	29	30
Ground	A	A	H	A	H	A	H	H	A	H	A	H	A	A	H	H	H	A	H	A	H	A	H	A	A	H	A	H	A	H
Result	D	W	W	L	W	L	W	D	W	W	L	W	W	D	W	D	L	W	D	D	L	D	W	D	W	L	W	L	W	L
Position	9	4	5	6	3	5	3	3	4	1	1	2	1	1	1	1	1	1	1	1	3	2	2	2	2	2	2	2	2	2

Updated to match(es) played on 22 December 2016. Source: Competitive matches
A = Away; H = Home; W = Win; D = Draw; L = Loss

=== Matches ===
Win Draw Loss

20 August 2016 Round 1	JS Kabylie	0–0	MC Alger	Tizi Ouzou
19:00		Soccerway report Live TV: TV Tamazight 4		Stadium: Stade 1er Novembre 1954; Referee: Abderrezzak Arab

27 August 2016 Round 2	USM El Harrach	1–2	MC Alger	Algiers
19:00	Harrag 28'	Report; Live TV: TV Tamazight 4	22' Boudebouda; 25' Mokdad	Stadium: Stade du 5 Juillet; Referee: Mohamed Benouza

10 September 2016 Round 3	MC Alger	1–0	CA Batna	Bologhine
19:00	Bouguèche 7'	Report; Live TV: None		Stadium: Stade Omar Hamadi; Attendance: 0 (close doors); Referee: Mohamed Boukhalfa

16 September 2016 Round 4	NA Hussein Dey	1–0	MC Alger	Algiers
17:45	Bendebka 29'	Report; Live TV: EPTV Terrestre / TV Tamazight 4		Stadium: Stade du 5 Juillet; Referee: Lahlou Benbraham

23 September 2016 Round 5	MC Alger	1–0	MC Oran	Bologhine
19:00	Seguer 82'	Report; Live TV: None		Stadium: Stade Omar Hamadi; Attendance: 0 (close doors); Referee: Rafik Achouri

1 October 2016 Round 6	ES Sétif	2–0	MC Alger	Sétif
17:00	Haddouche 3'; Nadji 19' (pen.)	Report; Live TV: Algérie 3 / TV Tamazight 4		Stadium: Stade 8 Mai 1945; Referee: Mohamed Benouza

13 October 2016 Round 7	MC Alger	2–1	USM Alger	Blida
19:00	Zerdab 38', 77' (pen.)	Report; Live TV: None	87' Guessan	Stadium: Stade Mustapha Tchaker; Attendance: 0 (close doors); Referee: Mohamed Boukhalfa

27 October 2016 Round 9	MC Alger	0–0	JS Saoura	Bologhine
17:00		Report; Live TV: beIN Sports / TV Tamazight 4		Stadium: Stade Omar Hamadi; Referee: Farouk Mial

5 November 2016 Round 10	DRB Tadjenanet	0–1	MC Alger	Tadjenanet
15:30		Report; Live TV: TV Tamazight 4	35' Nekkache	Stadium: Lahoua Smaïl Stadium; Referee: Boubekeur Zouaoui

13 November 2016 Round 11	MC Alger	2–1	CS Constantine	Algiers
18:00	Karaoui 45'; Boudebouda 55'	Report; Live TV: None	34' Manucho	Stadium: Stade du 5 Juillet; Referee: Mustapha Bessiri

2 December 2016 Round 13	MC Alger	2–0	RC Relizane	Bologhine
17:00	Hachoud 57', 87' (pen.)	Report; Live TV: None		Stadium: Omar Hamadi Stadium; Attendance: 0 (close doors); Referee: Rafik Achouri

6 December 2016 Round 8	MO Béjaïa	0–1	MC Alger	Sétif
16:00		Report; Live TV: None	22' Nekkache	Stadium: Stade 8 Mai 1945; Attendance: 0 (close doors)

19 November 2016 Round 12	CR Belouizdad	1–0	MC Alger	Algiers
16:00	Lakroum 42'	Report; Live TV: Algérie 3		Stadium: Stade du 5 Juillet; Referee: Mustapha Ghorbal

10 December 2016 Round 14	Olympique de Médéa	1–1	MC Alger	Médéa
15:00	Demmou 10' (o.g.)	Report; Live TV: Algérie 3	38' (pen.) Hachoud	Stadium: Stade Imam Lyes de Médéa; Referee: Lahlou Benbraham

22 December 2016 Round 15	MC Alger	3–1	USM Bel-Abbès	Bologhine
17:00	Hachoud 28'; Nekkache 33'; Bouguèche 50'	Report; Live TV: TV Tamazight 4 / Canal Algérie	84' Bouguelmouna	Stadium: Omar Hamadi Stadium; Referee: Mehdi Abid Charef

28 January 2017 Round 17	MC Alger	0–1	USM El Harrach	Algiers
16:00		Report; Live TV: TV Tamazight 4 / Algérie 3	59' Benamra	Stadium: Stade du 5 Juillet; Referee: Lahlou Benbraham

3 February 2017 Round 18	CA Batna	1–2	MC Alger	Batna
15:00	Benmansour 47'	Report; Live TV: None	17' Seguer; 45+1' Nekkache	Stadium: Mustapha Seffouhi Stadium; Referee: Abderrezzak Arab

7 February 2017 Round 19	MC Alger	1–1	NA Hussein Dey	Algiers
18:00	Seguer 87'	Report; Live TV: Canal Algérie	84' (pen.) Gasmi	Stadium: Stade du 5 Juillet; Referee: Elias Bekouassa

24 February 2017 Round 21	MC Alger	1–2	ES Sétif	Algiers
17:45	Mansouri 23'	Report; Live TV: Canal Algérie / TV Tamazight 4 / beIN Sports	48' (pen.) Nadji; 78' Tembeng	Stadium: Stade du 5 Juillet; Referee: Mehdi Abid Charef

4 March 2017 Round 22	USM Alger	2–2	MC Alger	Algiers
17:45	Meftah 21'; Benyahia 25'	Report; Live TV: Algérie 3 / Al-Kass Sports	4' Seguer; 10' Bouguèche	Stadium: Stade du 5 Juillet; Referee: Rafik Achouri

25 March 2017 Round 16	MC Alger	1–1	JS Kabylie	Algiers
16:00; Match rescheduled due to share some of their players in the African Cup and World Cup military	Derrardja 77'	Report; Live TV: Algérie 3 / Al-Kass Sports	83' Boulaouidet	Stadium: Stade du 5 Juillet; Referee: Said Aouina

21 April 2017 Round 20	MC Oran	0–0	MC Alger	Oran
17:00; Match rescheduled due to MC Alger competing in the 2017 CAF Confederation Cup		Report; Live TV: TV Tamazight 4		Stadium: Ahmed Zabana Stadium; Referee: Lahlou Benbraham

25 April 2017 Round 23	MC Alger	4–1	MO Béjaïa	Algiers
18:00	Hachoud 34'; Zerdab 63'; Mansouri 80'; Chérif El-Ouazzani 87'	Report; Live TV: None	36' Bouchema	Stadium: Stade du 5 Juillet; Referee: Rafik Achouri

29 April 2017 Round 24	JS Saoura	0–0	MC Alger	Béchar
19:00		Report; Live TV: None		Stadium: August 20, 1955 Stadium; Referee: Mustapha Ghorbal

6 May 2017 Round 25	MC Alger	2–1	DRB Tadjenanet	Algiers
16:00	Zerdab 13'; Derrardja 78'	Report; Live TV: TV Tamazight 4	63' Terbah	Stadium: Stade du 5 Juillet; Referee: Mohamed Boukhalfa

20 May 2017 Round 26	CS Constantine	2–0	MC Alger	Constantine
16:00	Manucho 22' (pen.); Rebih 76'	Report; Live TV: None		Stadium: Ramadan Ben-Abdelmalek Stadium; Referee: Mohamed Saïdi

27 May 2017 Round 27	MC Alger	1–0	CR Belouizdad	Algiers
22:30	Hachoud 45+2'	Report; Live TV: Canal Algérie / TV Tamazight 4 / Al-Kass Sports		Stadium: Stade du 5 Juillet; Referee: Lotfi Bekouassa

7 June 2017 Round 28	RC Relizane	3–2	MC Alger	Relizane
17:00	Belmokhtar 32', 40'; Guebli 87'	Report; Live TV: EPTV Terrestre	48' Kacem; 54' Amachi	Stadium: Stade Tahar Zoughari; Referee: Farouk Mial

10 June 2017 Round 29	MC Alger	4–0	Olympique de Médéa	Bologhine
22:30	Hachoud 18'; Derrardja 48'; Nekkache 58', 63'	Report; Live TV: None		Stadium: Omar Hamadi Stadium; Attendance: 0 (close doors); Referee: Amine Hansal

14 June 2017 Round 30	USM Bel-Abbès	3–2	MC Alger	Sidi Bel Abbès
22:30	Tabti 11'; Balegh 14'; Bouguelmouna 15'	Report; Live TV: None	35' Nekkache; 77' Derrardja	Stadium: Stade 24 Fevrier 1956; Referee: Ahmed Bouzrar

== Algerian Super Cup ==
1 November 2016	USM Alger	2–0	MC Alger	Blida
17:45	Benkhemassa (yellow card) 38'; Abdellaoui (yellow card) 43'; Chafaï 61'; Meftah 77' (pen.)	Report; Live TV: Algérie 3 / beIN Sports / Al-Kass Sports	(yellow card) 39' Mebarakou; (yellow card) 43' (yellow-red card) 65' Boudebouda; (yellow card) 76' Chaâl; (yellow card) 79' Hachoud	Stadium: Stade Mustapha Tchaker; Attendance: 18.000; Referee: Mohamed Benouza

== Algerian Cup ==
26 November 2016 Round of 64	MC Alger	3–2	OM Arzew	Bologhine
15:00	Djemaouni 32'; Seguer 77'; Cherif Ouazzani 85' (pen.)	Report; Live TV: None	Bahari 76'; Mebarki 90'	Stadium: Stade Omar Hamadi; Attendance: 0 (close doors); Referee: Hafirassou, Gourari, Boulfelfel

16 December 2016 Round of 32	FCB Frenda	0–1	MC Alger	Tiaret
14:45		Report; Live TV: None	Derrardja 84'	Stadium: Stade Ahmed Kaïd; Referee: Arbaoui, Necib, Mesbah

27 December 2016 Round of 16	MC Alger	7–1	US Beni Douala	Bologhine
18:00	Bouguèche 2', 22'; Zerdab 31'; Djemaouni 46'; Boudebouda 60'; Azzi 79' (pen.); Kacem 89'	Report; Live TV: TV Tamazight 4	Zeghnoun 66'	Stadium: Omar Hamadi Stadium; Referee: Boukhalfa, Zerhouni, Benali

1 April 2017 Quarter-finals	MC Alger	0–0 (a.e.t.) (3–1 p)	JS Kabylie	Algiers
16:00		Report; Live TV: Canal Algérie		Stadium: July 5, 1962 Stadium; Referee: Ghorbal, Zerhouni, Benali

24 June 2017 Semi-finals	MC Alger	2–3 (a.e.t.)	ES Sétif	Bologhine
22:30	Aouedj 30'; Boudebouda 116'	Report; Live TV: Canal Algérie / TV Tamazight 4 / Al-Kass Sports	28' Ziti; 99' Bedrane; 115' Djabou	Stadium: Stade Omar Hamadi; Referee: Abderrezzak Arab

== CAF Confederation Cup ==
=== Preliminary round ===
12 February 2017 first leg	Bechem United (Ghana)	2–1	(Algeria) MC Alger	Accra
15:00 UTC+0	Touré 47' (pen.); Bonsu 75'	Report	Seguer 64'	Stadium: Accra Sports Stadium; Referee: Boureima Sanogo (Burkina Faso)
Note: Lineup for MC Alger - Chaouchi, Hachoud, Mebarakou, Azzi, Bouhenna, Karaoui, Kacem, Derrardja (Mansouri, 46'), Bouguèche, Seguer (Cherif El Ouazzani, 85'), Mokdad (Aouedj, 60').

18 February 2017 Second leg	MC Alger (Algeria)	4–1	(Ghana) Bechem United	Algiers
20:30 UTC+1	Seguer 1'; Hachoud 39', 84' (pen.); Mansouri 87' (pen.)	Report	Acheampong 59'	Stadium: Stade du 5 Juillet 1962; Referee: Adil Zourak (Morocco)
Note: Lineup for MC Alger - Chaouchi, Hachoud, Mebarakou, Bouhenna, Chita (Zerdab, 78'), Seguer, Karaoui, Kacem, Mansouri, Bouguèche (Cherif El Ouazzani, 90'), Nekkache (Derrardja, 62').

=== First round ===
10 March 2017 first leg	MC Alger (Algeria)	2–0	(Democratic Republic of the Congo) Renaissance du Congo	Algiers
20:45 UTC+1	Aouedj 56'; Bouhenna 81'	Report		Stadium: Stade du 5 Juillet 1962; Referee: Isaac Montgomery (Liberia)
Note: Lineup for MC Alger - Chaouchi, Hachoud, Boudebouda, Bouhenna, Mebarakou, Kacem, Karaoui, Mansouri, Aouedj, Nekkache (Djemaouni, 85'), Zerdab (Derrardja, 62').

17 March 2017 Second leg	Renaissance du Congo (Democratic Republic of the Congo)	2–1	(Algeria) MC Alger	Kinshasa
15:30 UTC+1	Asumani 7'; Ducapel 79'	Report	Kacem 50'	Stadium: Stade des Martyrs; Referee: Idris Mehammed Osman (Eritrea)
Note: Lineup for MC Alger - Chaouchi, Hachoud, Boudebouda, Bouhenna, Mebarakou, Kacem, Karaoui, Chita (Cherif El Ouazzani, 46'), Derrardja (Mansouri, 69'), Aouedj (Zerdab, 83'), Nekkache.

=== Play-off round ===
8 April 2017 first leg	Young Africans (Tanzania)	1–0	(Algeria) MC Alger	Dar es Salaam
16:00 UTC+3	Kamusoko 60'	Report		Stadium: National Stadium; Referee: Louis Hakizimana (Rwanda)
Note: Lineup for MC Alger - Chaouchi, Hachoud, Karaoui, Mebarakou, Bouhenna, Kacem, Cherif El Ouazzani, Derrardja, Bouguèche (Zerdab, 81'), Gourmi (Seguer, 73'), Nekkache (Aouedj, 75').

15 April 2017 Second leg	MC Alger (Algeria)	4–0	(Tanzania) Young Africans	Algiers
18:00 UTC+1	Aouedj 14', 90+1'; Derrardja 39'; Zerdab 65'	Report		Stadium: Stade du 5 Juillet 1962; Referee: Yakhouba Keita (Guinea)
Note: Lineup for MC Alger - Chaouchi, Hachoud, Karaoui, Mebarakou, Bouhenna, Cherif El Ouazzani, Kacem, Derardja (Chita, 84'), Aouedj, Zerdab (Mansouri, 80'), Bougueche (Seguer, 72').

=== group stage ===
Pos	Team	Pld	W	D	L	GF	GA	GD	Pts	Qualification	CSS	MCA	MBS	PST
1	(Tunisia) CS Sfaxien	6	4	1	1	13	4	+9	13	Quarter-finals	—	4–0	1–0	3–0
2	(Algeria) MC Alger	6	3	2	1	7	7	0	11	Quarter-finals	2–1	—	2–1	2–0
3	(Eswatini) Mbabane Swallows	6	1	2	3	8	10	−2	5		1–3	0–0	—	4–2
4	(South Africa) Platinum Stars	6	0	3	3	6	13	−7	3		1–1	1–1	2–2	—

Source: CAF
Rules for classification: Group stage tiebreakers

14 May 2017 Matchday 1	Platinum Stars (South Africa)	1–1	(Algeria) MC Alger	Rustenburg
17:00 UTC+2	Khunou 43'	Report	Boudebouda 6'	Stadium: Royal Bafokeng Stadium; Referee: Peter Waweru (Kenya)

23 May 2017 Matchday 2	MC Alger (Algeria)	2–1	(Tunisia) CS Sfaxien	Algiers
21:00 UTC+1	Nekkache 26'; Hachoud 66'	Report	Aouadhi 41'	Stadium: July 5, 1962 Stadium; Referee: Mahmoud Zakaria El Banna (Egypt)

2 June 2017 Matchday 3	Mbabane Swallows (Eswatini)	0–0	(Algeria) MC Alger	Lobamba
15:00 UTC+2		Report		Stadium: Somhlolo National Stadium; Referee: Israel Mujuni (Tanzania)

20 June 2017 Matchday 4	MC Alger (Algeria)	2–1	(Eswatini) Mbabane Swallows	Algiers
23:00 UTC+1	Nekkache 4', 28'	Report	Ndlovu 73'	Stadium: July 5, 1962 Stadium; Referee: Mahamadou Keita (Mali)

30 June 2017 Matchday 5	MC Alger (Algeria)	2-0	(South Africa) Platinum Stars	Algiers
21:00 UTC+1	Hachoud 12' (pen.); Nekkache 90+2'	Report		Stadium: July 5, 1962 Stadium; Referee: Juste Ephrem Zio (Burkina Faso)

8 July 2017 Matchday 6	CS Sfaxien (Tunisia)	4-0	(Algeria) MC Alger	Sfax
19:00 UTC+1	Chaouat 2', 88'; Amdouni 90+4'; Marzouki 90+6'	Report		Stadium: Stade Taïeb Mhiri; Referee: Denis Batte (Uganda)

== Squad information ==
=== Playing statistics ===
No.	Pos	Nat	Player	Total		Ligue 1		Algerian Cup		Confederation Cup		Super Cup	
No.	Pos	Nat	Player	Apps	Goals	Apps	Goals	Apps	Goals	Apps	Goals	Apps	Goals
16	GK	(Algeria) ALG	Kheireddine Boussouf	5	0	5	0	0	0	0	0	0	0
30	GK	(Algeria) ALG	Farid Chaâl	15	0	12	0	2	0	0	0	1	0
1	GK	(Algeria) ALG	Faouzi Chaouchi	29	0	15	0	2	0	12	0	0	0
22	DF	(Algeria) ALG	Ayoub Azzi	29	1	23	0	2	1	3	0	1	0
6	DF	(Algeria) ALG	Brahim Boudebouda	31	4	22	2	1	1	7	1	1	0
29	DF	(Algeria) ALG	Rachid Bouhenna	29	1	15	0	3	0	11	1	0	0
24	DF	(Algeria) ALG	Abdelghani Demmou	25	0	19	0	0	0	5	0	1	0
27	DF	(Algeria) ALG	Abderahmane Hachoud	44	11	28	7	3	0	12	4	1	0
15	DF	(Algeria) ALG	Zidane Mebarakou	27	0	15	0	4	0	7	0	1	0
10	MF	(Algeria) ALG	Sid Ahmed Aouedj	32	3	17	0	3	0	11	3	1	0
41	MF	(Algeria) ALG	Hichem Cherif El Ouazzani	30	2	16	1	4	1	10	0	0	0
44	MF	(Algeria) ALG	Oussama Chita	9	0	6	0	0	0	3	0	0	0
7	MF	(Algeria) ALG	Khaled Gourmi	17	0	10	0	1	0	6	0	0	0
8	MF	(Algeria) ALG	Mehdi Kacem	35	3	21	1	3	1	11	1	0	0
14	MF	(Algeria) ALG	Amir Karaoui	42	1	27	1	3	0	11	0	1	0
20	MF	(Algeria) ALG	Zakaria Mansouri	24	3	13	2	0	0	11	1	0	0
5	MF	(Algeria) ALG	Abdelmalek Mokdad	21	1	17	1	2	0	1	0	1	0
21	MF	(Algeria) ALG	Zahir Zerdab	27	6	18	4	3	1	5	1	1	0
	FW	(Algeria) ALG	Abdelaziz Ammachi	4	1	4	1	0	0	0	0	0	0
19	FW	(Algeria) ALG	Hadj Bouguèche	34	5	23	3	4	2	6	0	1	0
17	FW	(Algeria) ALG	Walid Derrardja	40	6	24	4	4	1	12	1	0	0
11	FW	(Algeria) ALG	Antar Djemaouni	16	2	11	0	3	2	2	0	0	0
9	FW	(Algeria) ALG	Hichem Nekkache	36	11	23	7	3	0	10	4	0	0
18	FW	(Algeria) ALG	Mohamed Seguer	27	7	19	4	2	1	5	2	1	0
Players transferred out during the season
23	MF	(Algeria) ALG	Antar Boucherit	8	0	6	0	1	0	0	0	1	0
	MF	(Algeria) ALG	Elyes Seddiki	7	0	6	0	1	0	0	0	0	0

Last updated: 28 May 2018
Source: fr.soccerway.com

== Squad list ==
As of January 15, 2017

Note: Flags indicate national team as defined under FIFA eligibility rules; some limited exceptions apply. Players may hold more than one non-FIFA nationality.

No.	Pos.	Nation	Player
1	GK	ALG	Faouzi Chaouchi
2	DF	ALG	Youcef Oudina
5	MF	ALG	Abdelmalek Mokdad
6	DF	ALG	Brahim Boudebouda
8	MF	ALG	Mehdi Kacem
7	FW	ALG	Khaled Gourmi
9	FW	ALG	Hichem Nekkache
10	FW	ALG	Sid Ahmed Aouedj
11	FW	ALG	Antar Djemaouni
12	MF	ALG	Yahia Khiter
14	MF	ALG	Amir Karaoui
15	DF	ALG	Zidane Mebarakou
16	GK	ALG	Kheireddine Boussouf

No.	Pos.	Nation	Player
17	FW	ALG	Walid Derrardja
18	FW	ALG	Mohamed Seguer
19	FW	ALG	Hadj Bouguèche
20	FW	ALG	Zakaria Mansouri
21	MF	ALG	Zahir Zerdab
22	MF	ALG	Ayoub Azzi
24	DF	ALG	Abdelghani Demmou
27	DF	ALG	Abderahmane Hachoud (captain)
29	DF	ALG	Rachid Bouhenna
30	GK	ALG	Farid Chaâl
41	MF	ALG	Hichem Cherif El Ouazzani
44	MF	ALG	Oussama Chita

== Transfers ==
=== In ===
Date	Pos	Player	From club	Transfer fee	Source
4 June 2016	FW	(Algeria) Zahir Zerdab	MO Béjaïa	Undisclosed	
8 June 2016	DF	(Algeria) Brahim Boudebouda	USM Alger	Undisclosed	
11 June 2016	FW	(Algeria) Hadj Bouguèche	USM El Harrach	Undisclosed	
11 June 2016	FW	(Algeria) Zakaria Mansouri	Paradou AC	Undisclosed	
23 June 2016	FW	(Algeria) Hichem Nekkache	CR Belouizdad	Undisclosed	
23 June 2016	DF	(Algeria) Zidane Mebarakou	MO Béjaïa	Undisclosed	
27 June 2016	FW	(Algeria) Mohamed Seguer	USM Alger	Undisclosed	
1 July 2016	GK	(Algeria) Kheireddine Boussouf	NA Hussein Dey	Undisclosed	
1 July 2016	FW	(Algeria) Antar Djemaouni	ASM Oran	Undisclosed	

=== Out ===
No.	Pos.	Nation	Player
21	DF	FRA	Toufik Zeghdane (to (Algeria) USM Alger)
—	FW	ALG	Lamine Abid (loan return to (Algeria) USM El Harrach)
16	GK	ALG	Jonathan Matijas (to (Algeria) DRB Tadjenanet)
