= Phala (disambiguation) =

Phala is a Sanskrit term that means "fruit" of one's actions in Hinduism and Buddhism.

Phala or Phalaphala can also refer to:

== People ==
- Bordin Phala (Thai: บดินทร์ ผาลา; 1994–), a Thai professional footballer
- Mahwidi John "Mokgomana" Phala (1924–2009), a South African politician and former anti-apartheid activist from Limpopo
- Katlego Suzan Phala (c. 1992 – ), a South African politician serving as a Member of the Limpopo Provincial Legislature for the Democratic Alliance
- Madi Phala (1955–2007), a South African artist
- Phala O. Phala, the creator of Kafka's Ape, a 2015 stage adaptation of Franz Kafka's short story "A Report to an Academy"
- Kgolane Alfred "Rudolph" Phala, a South African politician who has represented the African National Congress (ANC) in the Limpopo Provincial Legislature since 2004
- Thuso Phala (1986–), a retired South African football midfielder

== Arts and media ==
- Karma Phala, a 2010 album by American singer-songwriter and multi-instrumentalist Sarah Fimm
- Mahadeshwara Pooja Phala, a 1974 or 1975 Indian Kannada-language film, directed by Sangram Singh and produced by S. V. Rajendra Singh
- Phalaphala FM, a South African radio station operating through SABC
- Samshaya Phala, a 1971 Indian Kannada-language romantic drama film by A. M. Sameullah

== Linguistics ==
- Phala language (autonym: pʰa³¹la³³, loconym: χa³³lə⁵⁵mi³³; ISO 639-3: ypa, Glottolog: phal1256), a language, alongside Phola, in the Upriver clade of the Riverine Phula macro-clade of the Southeastern Loloish/Ngwi branch of the Sino-Tibetan family
- Ra phala/kar (AKA Ro pholo), a conjunct involving the consonant র/ৰ in Bengali/Assamese and Odia
- Va phala (AKA vo pholo, Ba Phala, Wa Phala), a conjunct involving the consonant ব in Bengali and Odia
- Ya phala (AKA Jô-fôla), a conjunct involving the consonant য in Bangla and Odia

== Other uses ==
- Bhumi Phala Stadium, a football venue in Temanggung, Indonesia
- Phala Phala, South African President Cyril Ramaphosa's private game farm near Bela-Bela, Limpopo, the subject of a 2020 robbery known as the Cyril Ramaphosa Farm Burglary or Farmgate Scandal

== See also ==
- Phola (disambiguation)
- Pholo (disambiguation)
