= 2017–18 MC Alger season =

MC Alger
2017–18 season
- Owner: Sonatrach
- Chairman: Kamel Kaci-Saïd
- Head coach: Bernard Casoni
- Stadium: Stade Omar Hamadi; Stade du 5 Juillet
- Ligue 1: 5th
- Algerian Cup: Round of 64
- Confederation Cup: Quarter-finals
- Champions League: Group stage
- Top goalscorer: League: Walid Derrardja (10 goals); All: Walid Derrardja (14 goals); Hichem Nekkache (14 goals)
Home colours	Away colours

In the 2017–18 season, MC Alger competed in the Ligue 1 for the 47th season, as well as the Algerian Cup.

== Squad list ==
Players and squad numbers last updated on 6 August 2009.
Note: Flags indicate national team as has been defined under FIFA eligibility rules. Players may hold more than one non-FIFA nationality.

No.	Name	Nat.	Position	Date of birth (age)	Signed from
Goalkeepers
Defenders
Midfielders
Forwards

== Competitions ==
=== Overview ===
Competition	Record								Started round	Final position / round	First match	Last match
Competition	G	W	D	L	GF	GA	GD	Win %	Started round	Final position / round	First match	Last match
Ligue 1	30	12	8	10	41	32	+9	40.00	—N/a	5th	26 August 2017	19 May 2018
Algerian Cup	5	4	1	0	9	1	+8	80.00	Round of 64	Semi-final	29 December 2017	13 April 2018
Champions League	6	3	1	2	18	5	+13	50.00	Preliminary round	Group stage	11 February 2018	15 May 2018
Confederation Cup	2	1	0	1	1	2	−1	50.00	Group stage	Quarter-final	8 July 2017	24 September 2017
Total	43	20	10	13	69	40	+29	46.51				

Updated to match played 28 May 2018
Source: Competitions

== League table ==
Pos	Team	Pld	W	D	L	GF	GA	GD	Pts	Qualification or relegation
3	NA Hussein Dey	30	11	16	3	36	24	+12	49	Qualification for the 2018–19 Confederation Cup
4	MC Oran	30	12	9	9	40	37	+3	45	
5	MC Alger	30	12	8	10	41	32	+9	44	Qualification for 2018–19 Arab Club Champions Cup
6	USM Alger	30	11	9	10	43	35	+8	42 (Note: Ranked on head-to-head results.)	Qualification for 2018–19 Arab Club Champions Cup
7	Paradou AC	30	12	6	12	35	30	+5	42	

Updated to match(es) played on 19 May 2018. Source: DZFoot
Rules for classification: 1) points; 2) head-to-head points; 3) head-to-head goal difference; 4) goal difference; 5) total goals; 6) fairplay ranking; 7) playoff.

=== Results summary ===
Overall								Home						Away					
Pld	W	D	L	GF	GA	GD	Pts	W	D	L	GF	GA	GD	W	D	L	GF	GA	GD
30	12	8	10	41	32	+9	44	8	3	4	25	14	+11	4	5	6	16	18	−2

Last updated: 30 January 2016.
Source: Competitive matches

=== Results by round ===
Round	1	2	3	4	5	6	7	8	9	10	11	12	13	14	15	16	17	18	19	20	21	22	23	24	25	26	27	28	29	30
Ground	A	H	A	H	A	H	A	H	A	H	A	H	A	H	A	H	A	H	A	H	A	H	A	H	A	H	A	H	A	H
Result	W	D	L	D	L	L	D	W	W	W	L	W	D	W	D	W	W	D	L	W	D	W	L	W	W	L	D	L	L	L
Position	6	7	11	13	13	13	13	12	9	6	8	5	6	5	5	4	3	4	5	3	3	3	4	3	2	2	4	4	4	5

Source: Competitive matches
A = Away; H = Home; W = Win; D = Draw; L = Loss

=== Matches ===
Win Draw Loss

25 August 2017 Round 1	US Biskra	0–1	MC Alger	Biskra
17:00		Soccerway report Live TV: Canal Algérie / TV Tamazight 4	25' Nekkache	Stadium: El Alia Sports Complex; Referee: Mohamed Saïdi

9 September 2017 Round 2	MC Alger	1–1	ES Sétif	Bologhine
17:45	Azzi 25'	Soccerway report Live TV: None	65' Bedrane	Stadium: Omar Hamadi Stadium; Attendance: 0 (close doors); Referee: Mustapha Bessiri

12 September 2017 Round 3	CR Belouizdad	2–0	MC Alger	Belouizdad
17:00	Hamia 45+2'; Aribi 90+3'	Soccerway report Live TV: Canal Algérie		Stadium: August 20, 1955 Stadium; Referee: Lotfi Bekouassa; Man of the Match: Draoui

29 September 2017 Round 5	CS Constantine	1–0	MC Alger	Constantine
17:00	Abid 71'	Soccerway report Live TV: Canal Algérie		Stadium: Stade Mohamed Hamlaoui; Referee: Mohamed Saïdi

3 October 2017 Round 4	MC Alger	0–0	Olympique de Médéa	Bologhine
18:00		Soccerway report Live TV: Algérie 3 / TV Tamazight 4		Stadium: Omar Hamadi Stadium; Referee: Mohamed Boukhalfa

17 October 2017 Round 7	MC Oran	0–0	MC Alger	Oran
17:00		Soccerway report Live TV: EPTV Terrestre / TV Tamazight 4		Stadium: Ahmed Zabana Stadium; Referee: Boubekeur Zouaoui

21 October 2017 Round 8	MC Alger	2–0	JS Kabylie	Bologhine
17:45	Derrardja 19', 63'	Soccerway report Live TV: TV Tamazight 4		Stadium: Omar Hamadi Stadium; Referee: Said Aouina

28 October 2017 Round 9	USM Blida	1–2	MC Alger	Blida
16:00	El Imam 58'	Soccerway report Live TV: None	8' Nekkache; 87' Hachoud	Stadium: Brakni Brothers Stadium; Referee: Mohamed Boukhalfa

3 November 2017 Round 10	MC Alger	2–1	Paradou AC	Bologhine
16:00	Balegh 23'; Derrardja 53'	Soccerway report Live TV: Algérie 3 / TV Tamazight 4	78' Cheraitia	Stadium: Omar Hamadi Stadium; Referee: Mustapha Ghorbal

9 November 2017 Round 11	NA Hussein Dey	1–0	MC Alger	Belouizdad
16:00	Boulaouidet 90'	Soccerway report Live TV: Canal Algérie		Stadium: August 20, 1955 Stadium; Referee: Mehdi Abid Charef

17 November 2017 Round 12	MC Alger	2–1	DRB Tadjenanet	Bologhine
17:00	Hachoud 11' (pen.); Boudebouda 64'	Soccerway report Live TV: TV Tamazight 4	49' Dousse	Stadium: Omar Hamadi Stadium; Referee: Lahlou Benbraham

28 November 2017 Round 6	MC Alger	0–2	USM Alger	Algiers
17:45		Soccerway report Live TV: Al-Kass Sports / Algérie 3 / TV Tamazight 4	56' (pen.) Benmoussa; 84' Darfalou	Stadium: Stade du 5 Juillet; Referee: Lotfi Bekouassa; Man of the Match: Benguit

2 December 2017 Round 13	USM Bel-Abbès	1–1	MC Alger	Sidi Bel Abbès
16:00	Khali 67'	Soccerway report Live TV: Algérie 3	37' (pen.) Hachoud	Stadium: Stade 24 Fevrier 1956; Referee: Said Aouina

7 December 2017 Round 14	MC Alger	2–0	USM El Harrach	Algiers
17:45	Hachoud 64'; Bendebka 66'	Soccerway report Live TV: TV Tamazight 4		Stadium: Stade du 5 Juillet; Referee: Nabil Boukhalfa

15 December 2017 Round 15	JS Saoura	1–1	MC Alger	Béchar
18:00	Hammia 14'	Soccerway report Live TV: None	64' El Moudene	Stadium: Stade 20 Août 1955; Referee: Rafik Achouri

6 January 2018 Round 16	MC Alger	2–0	US Biskra	Algiers
16:00	Bendebka 19'; Hachoud 79'	Soccerway report Live TV: None		Stadium: Stade du 5 Juillet; Referee: Boubekeur Zouaoui

20 January 2018 Round 17	ES Sétif	1–2	MC Alger	Sétif
19:00	Nadji 1'	Soccerway report Live TV: TV Tamazight 4	12' Souibaâh; 80' Nekkache	Stadium: Stade 8 Mai 1945; Referee: Mohamed Saïdi

27 January 2018 Round 18	MC Alger	0–0	CR Belouizdad	Algiers
17:00		Soccerway report Live TV: Canal Algérie		Stadium: Stade du 5 Juillet; Referee: Ahmed Bouzrar

6 February 2018 Round 19	Olympique de Médéa	1–0	MC Alger	Médéa
15:00	Koulkheir 23'	Soccerway report Live TV: None		Stadium: Stade Imam Lyes de Médéa; Referee: Nabil Boukhalfa

16 February 2018 Round 20	MC Alger	3–0	CS Constantine	Algiers
17:00	Souibaâh 6'; Bendebka 28'; Amada 79' (pen.)	Soccerway report Live TV: Algérie 3 / Canal Algérie / beIN Sports		Stadium: Stade du 5 Juillet; Referee: Lahlou Benbraham

24 February 2018 Round 21	USM Alger	2–2	MC Alger	Algiers
17:00	Darfalou 1'; Bouderbal 19'	Soccerway report Live TV: Al-Kass Sports / Algérie 3 / Canal Algérie	56' Bendebka; 71' Hachoud	Stadium: Stade du 5 Juillet; Referee: Lotfi Bekouassa

12 March 2018 Round 22	MC Alger	4–0	MC Oran	Algiers
18:00	Nekkache 4'; Bendebka 19'; Souibaâh 46'; Balegh 90'	Soccerway report Live TV: Al-Kass Sports / EPTV Terrestre		Stadium: Stade du 5 Juillet; Referee: Said Aouina

30 March 2018 Round 24	MC Alger	4–1	USM Blida	Algiers
17:00	Hachoud 11'; Derrardja 60', 68'; Souibaâh 73'	Soccerway report Live TV: None	21' Aissa El Bey	Stadium: Stade du 5 Juillet; Referee: Mohamed Saïdi

3 April 2018 Round 23	JS Kabylie	3–1	MC Alger	Tizi Ouzou
17:00	Djabout 8'; Hammar 32'; Benaldjia 75'	Soccerway report Live TV: Al-Kass Sports / EPTV Terrestre / TV Tamazight 4	20' (pen.) Derrardja	Stadium: November 1, 1954 Stadium; Referee: Mustapha Ghorbal

7 April 2018 Round 25	Paradou AC	1–5	MC Alger	Bologhine
15:00	Naidji 24' (pen.)	Soccerway report Live TV: None	7' Souibaâh; 14', 38' Derrardja; 71' Bendebka; 90+2' Balegh	Stadium: Omar Hamadi Stadium; Referee: Ahmed Bouzrar

20 April 2018 Round 26	MC Alger	1–2	NA Hussein Dey	Algiers
16:00	Bendebka 72'	Soccerway report Live TV: Al-Kass Sports / Canal Algérie	45+2' Alati; 53' Ouertani	Stadium: Stade du 5 Juillet; Referee: Boubekeur Zouaoui

24 April 2018 Round 27	DRB Tadjenanet	1–1	MC Alger	Tadjenanet
16:00	Meddahi 22'	Soccerway report Live TV: Canal Algérie	90+6' Derrardja	Stadium: Lahoua Smaïl Stadium; Referee: Nabil Boukhalfa

27 April 2018 Round 28	MC Alger	1–2	USM Bel-Abbès	Bologhine
16:00	Derrardja 57'	Soccerway report Live TV: None	19' Metref; 59' Bouguettaya	Stadium: Omar Hamadi Stadium; Attendance: 0 (close doors); Referee: Ahmed Bouzrar

11 May 2018 Round 29	USM El Harrach	2–0	MC Alger	Algiers
16:00	Ait Abdelmalek 10'; Nekrouf 83'	Soccerway report Live TV: None		Stadium: Stade 1er Novembre 1954; Attendance: 0 (close doors); Referee: Mohamed Saïdi

19 May 2018 Round 30	MC Alger	1–4	JS Saoura	Algiers
16:00	Bendebka 24'	Soccerway report Live TV: None	26', 61', 83' Yahia-Chérif; 64' Bourdim	Stadium: Stade du 5 Juillet; Attendance: 0 (close doors); Referee: Merzoug Brahimi

== Algerian Cup ==
30 December 2017 Round of 64	MC Alger	4–0	WA Tlemcen	Algiers
16:00	Souibaâh 18'; Nekkache 35', 90+3'; Balegh 45+1'	Report; Live TV: Algérie 3		Stadium: July 5, 1962 Stadium; Referee: Abderrezzak Arab

13 January 2018 Round of 32	A Bou Saâda	0–1	MC Alger	Bou Saâda
14:00		Report; Live TV: None	71' Nekkache	Stadium: Stade Mokhtar Abdelatif; Referee: Merzoug Brahimi

1 February 2018 Round of 16	MC Alger	2–1 (a.e.t.)	CR Belouizdad	Algiers
17:00	Derrardja 40', 98' (pen.)	Report; Live TV: Canal Algérie	20' Sidibe	Stadium: July 5, 1962 Stadium; Referee: Said Aouina

2 March 2018 Quarter-finals	MC Alger	2–0	MO Béjaïa	Algiers
17:00	Azzi 22'; Mebarakou 76'	Report; Live TV: TV Tamazight 4 / Canal Algérie		Stadium: July 5, 1962 Stadium; Referee: Mehdi Abid Charef

13 April 2018 Semi-final	JS Kabylie	0–0 (a.e.t.) (5–4 p)	MC Alger	Constantine
16:00		Report; Live TV: TV Tamazight 4 / EPTV Terrestre / Al-Kass Sports		Stadium: Stade Mohamed Hamlaoui; Attendance: 45,000; Referee: Said Aouina
	Penalties
	Boukhenchouche (penalty scored); Benyoucef (penalty scored); Raiah (penalty scored); Saâdou (penalty missed); Djabout (penalty scored); Benaldjia (penalty scored)		(penalty scored) Derrardja; (penalty missed) Hachoud; (penalty scored) Bendebka; (penalty scored) Azzi; (penalty scored) Souibaâh; (penalty missed) Ammachi

== CAF Confederation Cup ==
=== Quarter-finals ===
16 September 2017 First Leg	MC Alger (Algeria)	1−0	(Tunisia) Club Africain	Algiers
20:45 UTC+1	Nekkache 9'	Report		Stadium: Stade du 5 Juillet; Referee: Noureddine El Jaafari (Morocco)

24 September 2017 Second Leg	Club Africain (Tunisia)	2–0	(Algeria) MC Alger	Radès
19:00 UTC+1	Zemzemi 21' (pen.); Khalifa 82'	Report		Stadium: Stade Olympique de Radès; Referee: Thierry Nkurunziza (Burundi)

== Champions League ==
=== Preliminary round ===
11 February 2018 first leg	AS Otôho (Republic of the Congo)	2–0	(Algeria) MC Alger	Owando
15:30 UTC+1	Cissé 57'; Ngatsongo 74'	CAF report		Stadium: Stade Omnisport Marien Ngouabi d'Owando; Referee: Blaise Yuven Ngwa (Cameroon)

21 February 2018 Second leg	MC Alger (Algeria)	9–0	(Republic of the Congo) AS Otôho	Algiers
19:00 UTC+1	Derrardja 5' (pen.); Nekkache 23', 61', 66', 80'; Souibaâh 33'; Amada 46'; Hachoud 70'; Balegh 76'	CAF Report		Stadium: July 5, 1962 Stadium; Referee: Haythem Guirat (Tunisia)

=== First round ===
7 March 2018 first leg	Mountain FM (Nigeria)	2–1	(Algeria) MC Alger	Lagos
16:00 UTC+1	Akuneto 36' (pen.); Bashiru 83'	CAF report	55' Ammachi	Stadium: Agege Stadium; Referee: Malang Diedhiou (Senegal)

17 March 2018 Second leg	MC Alger (Algeria)	6–0	(Nigeria) Mountain FM	Algiers
19:00 UTC+1	Bendebka 2'; Derrardja 10'; Nekkache 20', 54'; Karaoui 30'; Amada 90+2'	CAF Report		Stadium: July 5, 1962 Stadium; Referee: Youssef Essrayri (Tunisia)

=== Group stage ===
==== Group B ====
Pos	Team	Pld	W	D	L	GF	GA	GD	Pts	Qualification	TPM	ESS	DHJ	MCA
1	(Democratic Republic of the Congo) TP Mazembe	6	3	3	0	10	4	+6	12	Quarter-finals	—	4–1	1–1	1–0
2	(Algeria) ES Sétif	6	2	2	2	7	9	−2	8	Quarter-finals	1–1	—	2–1	0–1
3	(Morocco) Difaâ El Jadidi	6	1	3	2	6	7	−1	6		0–2	1–1	—	2–0
4	(Algeria) MC Alger	6	1	2	3	4	7	−3	5		1–1	1–2	1–1	—

Source: CAF

4 May 2018 1	MC Alger (Algeria)	1–1	(Morocco) Difaâ El Jadidi	Algiers
20:00 UTC+1	Karaoui 82'	Report	Ahaddad 77'	Stadium: Stade du 5-Juillet-1962; Referee: Sadok Selmi (Tunisia)

15 May 2018 2	ES Sétif (Algeria)	0–1	(Algeria) MC Alger	Sétif
20:00 UTC+1		Report	Karaoui 89'	Stadium: Stade du 8-Mai-1945; Referee: Gehad Grisha (Egypt)

== Squad information ==
=== Playing statistics ===
No.	Pos	Nat	Player	Total		Ligue 1		Algerian Cup		CC2		CL1	
No.	Pos	Nat	Player	Apps	Goals	Apps	Goals	Apps	Goals	Apps	Goals	Apps	Goals
1	GK	(Algeria) ALG	Faouzi Chaouchi	21	0	13	0	2	0	2	0	4	0
30	GK	(Algeria) ALG	Farid Chaâl	21	0	18	0	1	0	0	0	2	0
26	DF	(Algeria) ALG	Zine El Abidine Boulekhoua	16	0	12	0	0	0	2	0	2	0
22	DF	(Algeria) ALG	Ayoub Azzi	27	2	16	1	3	1	2	0	6	0
24	DF	(Algeria) ALG	Abdelghani Demmou	16	0	10	0	0	0	2	0	4	0
29	DF	(Algeria) ALG	Rachid Bouhenna	21	0	16	0	0	0	2	0	3	0
6	DF	(Algeria) ALG	Brahim Boudebouda	16	1	13	1	1	0	1	0	1	0
27	DF	(Algeria) ALG	Abderahmane Hachoud	37	8	27	7	3	0	1	0	6	1
15	DF	(Algeria) ALG	Zidane Mebarakou	32	1	24	0	3	1	0	0	5	0
14	MF	(Algeria) ALG	Amir Karaoui	33	2	23	0	2	0	2	0	6	2
13	MF	(Algeria) ALG	Hichem Chérif El-Ouazzani	31	0	22	0	3	0	2	0	4	0
3	MF	(Madagascar) MAD	Ibrahim Amada	27	3	20	1	1	0	2	0	4	2
25	MF	(Algeria) ALG	Sofiane Bendebka	33	9	26	8	2	0	1	0	4	1
23	FW	(Algeria) ALG	Abdellah El Moudene	32	1	25	1	3	0	0	0	4	0
18	MF	(Mali) MLI	Aliou Dieng	16	0	10	0	3	0	0	0	3	0
11	MF	(Algeria) ALG	Oussama Tebbi	11	0	9	0	1	0	0	0	1	0
	MF	(Algeria) ALG	Tarik Arezki	1	0	1	0	0	0	0	0	0	0
	MF	(Algeria) ALG	Abdelkrim Benarous	1	0	1	0	0	0	0	0	0	0
	MF	(Algeria) ALG	Koceila Kasdi	1	0	1	0	0	0	0	0	0	0
12	FW	(Algeria) ALG	Abou Sofiane Balegh	33	4	24	3	2	0	2	0	5	1
9	FW	(Algeria) ALG	Hichem Nekkache	37	11	28	4	2	0	2	1	5	6
28	FW	(Algeria) ALG	Abdelaziz Ammachi	15	1	11	0	2	0	1	0	1	1
17	FW	(Algeria) ALG	Walid Derrardja	32	14	24	10	3	2	0	0	5	2
19	FW	(Algeria) ALG	Mohamed Souibaâh	22	6	14	5	3	0	0	0	5	1
Players transferred out during the season
2	FW	(Nigeria) NGR	Barnabas Imenger Jr.	9	0	9	0	0	0	0	0	0	0
20	FW	(Algeria) ALG	Zakaria Mansouri	6	0	6	0	0	0	0	0	0	0
18	FW	(Algeria) ALG	Mohamed Seguer	7	0	5	0	0	0	2	0	0	0
10	FW	(Algeria) ALG	Sid Ahmed Aouedj	7	0	5	0	0	0	2	0	0	0

Last updated: 28 May 2018
Source: fr.soccerway.com

=== Goalscorers ===
Includes all competitive matches. The list is sorted alphabetically by surname when total goals are equal.

No.	Nat.	Player	Pos.	L 1	AC	CL 1	C 3	TOTAL
17	(Algeria)	Walid Derrardja	FW	10	2	2	0	14
9	(Algeria)	Hichem Nekkache	FW	4	3	6	1	14
25	(Algeria)	Sofiane Bendebka	MF	8	0	1	0	9
27	(Algeria)	Abderahmane Hachoud	DF	7	0	1	0	8
19	(Algeria)	Mohamed Souibaâh	FW	5	1	1	0	7
12	(Algeria)	Abou Sofiane Balegh	FW	3	1	1	0	5
3	(Madagascar)	Ibrahim Amada	MF	1	0	2	0	3
22	(Algeria)	Ayoub Azzi	DF	1	1	0	0	2
14	(Algeria)	Amir Karaoui	MF	0	0	2	0	2
23	(Algeria)	Abdellah El Moudene	MF	1	0	0	0	1
6	(Algeria)	Brahim Boudebouda	DF	1	0	0	0	1
28	(Algeria)	Abdelaziz Ammachi	FW	0	0	1	0	1
15	(Algeria)	Zidane Mebarakou	DF	0	1	0	0	1
Own Goals				0	0	0	0	0
Totals				41	9	18	1	69

== Squad list ==
As of August 25, 2017. Note: Flags indicate national team as defined under FIFA eligibility rules; some limited exceptions apply. Players may hold more than one non-FIFA nationality.

No.	Pos.	Nation	Player
1	GK	ALG	Faouzi Chaouchi
2	FW	NGR	Barnabas Imenger Jr.
3	MF	MAD	Ibrahim Amada
6	DF	ALG	Brahim Boudebouda
7	FW	ALG	Kaled Gourmi
9	FW	ALG	Hichem Nekkache
10	FW	ALG	Sid Ahmed Aouedj
12	FW	ALG	Abou Sofiane Balegh
13	MF	ALG	Hichem Chérif El-Ouazzani
14	MF	ALG	Amir Karaoui
15	DF	ALG	Zidane Mebarakou
17	FW	ALG	Walid Derrardja
18	FW	ALG	Mohamed Seguer

No.	Pos.	Nation	Player
20	FW	ALG	Zakaria Mansouri (on loan from Paradou AC)
22	MF	ALG	Ayoub Azzi
23	MF	ALG	Abdellah El Moudene (on loan from Paradou AC)
24	DF	ALG	Abdelghani Demmou
25	MF	ALG	Sofiane Bendebka
27	DF	ALG	Abderahmane Hachoud (captain)
26	DF	ALG	Zine El Abidine Boulekhoua
28	MF	ALG	Abdelaziz Ammachi
29	DF	ALG	Rachid Bouhenna
30	GK	ALG	Farid Chaâl
40	GK	ALG	Anis Yaici
-	FW	ALG	Koceila Kasdi

== Transfers ==
=== In ===
Date	Pos	Player	From club	Transfer fee	Source
13 July 2017	FW	(Algeria) Abou Sofiane Balegh	USM Bel-Abbès	Free transfer	
17 July 2017	DF	(Algeria) Zine El Abidine Boulekhoua	USM El Harrach	Free transfer	
22 July 2017	FW	(Algeria) Zakaria Mansouri	Paradou AC	Loan one year	
22 July 2017	MF	(Algeria) Abdellah El Mouden	Paradou AC	Loan one year + DA13,000,000	
23 July 2017	MF	(Algeria) Sofiane Bendebka	NA Hussein Dey	Free transfer	
30 July 2017	FW	(Nigeria) Barnabas Imenger	(Nigeria) Kano Pillars FC	Undisclosed	
31 July 2017	MF	(Madagascar) Ibrahim Amada	ES Sétif	Free transfer	
21 December 2017	FW	(Algeria) Mohamed Souibaâh	MC Oran	Free transfer (Released)	
29 December 2017	FW	(Algeria) Oussama Tebbi	RC Relizane	Free transfer (Released)	
15 January 2018	MF	(Mali) Aliou Dieng	(Mali) Djoliba AC	Free transfer	

=== Out ===
Date	Pos	Player	To club	Transfer fee	Source
3 July 2017	GK	(Algeria) Kheireddine Boussouf	NA Hussein Dey	Free transfer	
4 July 2017	MF	(Algeria) Oussama Chita	USM Alger	Free transfer	
1 July 2017	MF	(Algeria) Mehdi Kacem	Unattached	Free transfer	
1 July 2017	MF	(Algeria) Abdelmalek Mokdad	Unattached	Free transfer	
1 July 2017	FW	(Algeria) Zahir Zerdab	Unattached	Free transfer	
26 July 2017	FW	(Algeria) Hadj Bouguèche	USM El Harrach	Free transfer	
1 July 2017	MF	(Algeria) Elyes Seddiki	Unattached	Free transfer	
19 December 2017	FW	(Nigeria) Barnabas Imenger Jr.	Unattached	Free transfer (Released)	
31 December 2017	FW	(Algeria) Sid Ahmed Aouedj	ES Sétif	Free transfer (Released)	
13 January 2018	FW	(Algeria) Mohamed Seguer	USM Bel-Abbès	Free transfer (Released)	
19 December 2017	FW	(Algeria) Zakaria Mansouri	Paradou AC	Free transfer (Released)	
