= 2017 CAF Confederation Cup =

International football competition in Africa

2017 Total CAF Confederation Cup

Tournament details
- Dates: 10 February – 25 November 2017
- Teams: 52+16 (from 40 associations)

Final positions
- Champions: (Democratic Republic of the Congo) TP Mazembe (2nd title)
- Runners-up: (South Africa) Supersport United

Tournament statistics
- Matches played: 162
- Goals scored: 369 (2.28 per match)
- Top scorer: (Democratic Republic of the Congo) Ben Malango (6 goals)

The 2017 CAF Confederation Cup (officially the 2017 Total CAF Confederation Cup for sponsorship reasons) was the 14th edition of the CAF Confederation Cup, Africa's secondary club football competition organized by the Confederation of African Football (CAF).

Starting from this season, the group stage was expanded from eight to 16 teams, divided into four groups of four, and the knockout stage expanded from 4 to 8 teams.

Defending champions TP Mazembe, which entered the Confederation Cup after losing in the 2017 CAF Champions League first round, defeated Supersport United in the final, and earned the right to play against the winners of the 2017 CAF Champions League in the 2018 CAF Super Cup.

== Association team allocation ==
All 56 CAF member associations may enter the CAF Confederation Cup, with the 12 highest ranked associations according to their CAF 5-year ranking eligible to enter two teams in the competition. As a result, theoretically a maximum of 68 teams could enter the tournament (plus 16 teams eliminated from the CAF Champions League which enter the play-off round) – although this level has never been reached.

For the 2017 CAF Confederation Cup, the CAF uses the 2011–2015 CAF 5-year ranking, which calculates points for each entrant association based on their clubs' performance over those 5 years in the CAF Champions League and CAF Confederation Cup. The criteria for points are the following:

	CAF Champions League	CAF Confederation Cup
Winners	5 points	4 points
Runners-up	4 points	3 points
Losing semi-finalists	3 points	2 points
3rd place in groups	2 points	1 point
4th place in groups	1 point	1 point

The points are multiplied by a coefficient according to the year as follows:

- 2015 – 5
- 2014 – 4
- 2013 – 3
- 2012 – 2
- 2011 – 1

== Teams ==
The following 52 teams from 40 associations entered the competition.

- Teams in **bold** received a bye to the first round.
- The other teams entered the preliminary round.

Associations are shown according to their 2011–2015 CAF 5-year ranking – those with a ranking score have their rank and score indicated.

Association	Team	Qualifying method
Associations eligible to enter two teams (Ranked 1–12)
Tunisia (1st – 100 pts)	**CS Sfaxien**	2015–16 Tunisian Ligue Professionnelle 1 third place
Tunisia (1st – 100 pts)	**Club Africain**	2015–16 Tunisian Cup runners-up
Egypt (2nd – 80 pts)	**Smouha**	2015–16 Egyptian Premier League third place
Egypt (2nd – 80 pts)	Al-Masry	2015–16 Egyptian Premier League fourth place
(Democratic Republic of the Congo) DR Congo (3rd – 69 pts)	**SM Sanga Balende**	2015–16 Linafoot third place
(Democratic Republic of the Congo) DR Congo (3rd – 69 pts)	Renaissance du Congo	2016 Coupe du Congo DR winners
Algeria (4th – 64 pts)	JS Kabylie	2015–16 Algerian Ligue Professionnelle 1 third place
Algeria (4th – 64 pts)	MC Alger	2015–16 Algerian Cup winners
Sudan (5th – 51 pts)	**Al-Ahly Shendi**	2016 Sudan Premier League third place
Sudan (5th – 51 pts)	El-Hilal El-Obeid	2016 Sudan Cup runners-up
(South Africa) South Africa (6th – 27 pts)	Platinum Stars	2015–16 South African Premier Division third place
(South Africa) South Africa (6th – 27 pts)	SuperSport United	2015–16 Nedbank Cup winners
(Republic of the Congo) Congo (T-7th – 24 pts)	Étoile du Congo	2016 Congo Ligue 1 third place
(Republic of the Congo) Congo (T-7th – 24 pts)	CARA Brazzaville	2016 Coupe du Congo runners-up
Morocco (T-7th – 24 pts)	IR Tanger	2015–16 Botola third place
Morocco (T-7th – 24 pts)	MAS Fez	2016 Coupe du Trône winners
(Ivory Coast) Ivory Coast (T-9th – 23 pts)	SC Gagnoa	2015–16 Côte d'Ivoire Ligue 1 third place
(Ivory Coast) Ivory Coast (T-9th – 23 pts)	**ASEC Mimosas**	2016 Coupe de Côte d'Ivoire runners-up
Mali (T-9th – 23 pts)	**Djoliba**	2016 Malian Première Division third place
Mali (T-9th – 23 pts)	**Onze Créateurs**	2016 Malian Cup winners
Cameroon (11th – 19 pts)	Yong Sports Academy	2016 Elite One third place
Cameroon (11th – 19 pts)	APEJES Academy	2016 Cameroonian Cup winners
Nigeria (12th – 12 pts)	Wikki Tourists	2016 Nigeria Professional Football League third place
Nigeria (12th – 12 pts)	Ifeanyi Ubah	2016 Nigerian FA Cup winners
Associations eligible to enter one team
Angola (13th – 7 pts)	**Recreativo do Libolo**	2016 Taça de Angola winners
Ghana (T-14th – 4 pts)	Bechem United	2016 Ghanaian FA Cup winners
Libya (T-14th – 4 pts)	Al-Hilal Benghazi	2016 Libyan Cup runners-up
Zambia (T-14th – 4 pts)	**ZESCO United**	2016 Zambia Super League runners-up
Ethiopia (17th – 3 pts)	Defence Force	2016 Ethiopian Cup runners-up
Botswana	Orapa United	2015–16 Mascom Top 8 Cup winners
(Burkina Faso) Burkina Faso	AS SONABEL	2016 Coupe du Faso runners-up
Burundi	Le Messager Ngozi	2016 Burundian Cup winners
Comoros	Volcan Club	2016 Comoros Cup winners
(Equatorial Guinea) Equatorial Guinea	Racing de Micomeseng	2016 Equatoguinean Cup winners
Gabon	Akanda	2016 Coupe du Gabon Interclubs runners-up
Guinea	**AS Kaloum**	2016 Guinée Coupe Nationale runners-up
Kenya	Ulinzi Stars	2016 FKF President's Cup runners-up
Liberia	Monrovia Club Breweries	2016 Liberian Cup winners
Madagascar	ASSM Elgeco Plus	2016 Coupe de Madagascar runners-up
Mauritius	Pamplemousses	2016 Mauritian Cup winners
Mozambique	UD Songo	2016 Taça de Moçambique winners
Niger	AS Douanes Niamey	2016 Niger Cup winners
Rwanda	Rayon Sports	2016 Rwandan Cup winners
Senegal	ASC Niarry Tally	2016 Senegal FA Cup winners
Seychelles	St Michel United	2016 Seychelles FA Cup winners
(Sierra Leone) Sierra Leone	RSLAF	2016 Sierra Leonean FA Cup runners-up
(South Sudan) South Sudan	Wau Salaam	2016 South Sudan National Cup winners
(Eswatini) Swaziland	Mbabane Swallows	2016 Swazi Cup winners
Tanzania	**Azam**	2015–16 Tanzania FA Cup runners-up
Uganda	Vipers	2016 Ugandan Cup winners
Zanzibar	KVZ	2015–16 Zanzibar Premier League runners-up
Zimbabwe	Ngezi Platinum	2016 Cup of Zimbabwe winners

A further 16 teams eliminated from the 2017 CAF Champions League enter the play-off round.

Losers of the 2017 CAF Champions League first round
(Burkina Faso) Rail Club du Kadiogo	(Nigeria) Rivers United	(Ivory Coast) AS Tanda	(Guinea) Horoya
(Morocco) FUS Rabat	(Uganda) KCCA	(Gabon) CF Mounana	(Tanzania) Young Africans
(Liberia) Barrack Young Controllers	(Nigeria) Enugu Rangers	(The Gambia) Gambia Ports Authority	(Madagascar) CNaPS Sport
(South Africa) Bidvest Wits	(Democratic Republic of the Congo) TP Mazembe	(Republic of the Congo) AC Léopards	(Mauritius) AS Port-Louis 2000

Associations which did not enter a team

- Benin
- (Cape Verde) Cape Verde
- (Central African Republic) Central African Republic
- Chad
- Djibouti
- Eritrea
- (The Gambia) Gambia
- Guinea-Bissau
- Lesotho
- Malawi
- Mauritania
- Namibia
- Réunion
- (São Tomé and Príncipe) São Tomé and Príncipe
- Somalia
- Togo

Notably one team takes part in the competition that does not currently play in their national top-division. They are MAS Fez (2nd tier).

Location of teams of the 2017 CAF Confederation Cup.
Italics: Teams transferred from the 2017 CAF Champions League
Red: Preliminary round; Green: First Round; Purple: Play-off Round;
Brown: Group A; Orange: Group B; Yellow: Group C; Blue: Group D.

== Schedule ==
The schedule of the competition was as follows (matches scheduled in midweek in italics).

Phase	Round	Draw date	First leg	Second leg
Qualifying	Preliminary round	21 December 2016 (Cairo, Egypt)	10–12 February 2017	17–19 February 2017
Qualifying	First round	21 December 2016 (Cairo, Egypt)	10–12 March 2017	17–19 March 2017
Qualifying	Play-off round	21 March 2017 (Cairo, Egypt)	7–9 April 2017	14–16 April 2017
Group stage	Matchday 1	26 April 2017 (Cairo, Egypt)	12–14 May 2017	
Group stage	Matchday 2	26 April 2017 (Cairo, Egypt)	23–24 May 2017	
Group stage	Matchday 3	26 April 2017 (Cairo, Egypt)	2–4 June 2017	
Group stage	Matchday 4	26 April 2017 (Cairo, Egypt)	20–21 June 2017	
Group stage	Matchday 5	26 April 2017 (Cairo, Egypt)	30 June – 2 July 2017	
Group stage	Matchday 6	26 April 2017 (Cairo, Egypt)	7–9 July 2017	
Knockout stage	Quarter-finals	26 April 2017 (Cairo, Egypt)	15–17 September 2017	22–24 September 2017
Knockout stage	Semi-finals	26 April 2017 (Cairo, Egypt)	29 September – 1 October 2017	20–22 October 2017
Knockout stage	Final	26 April 2017 (Cairo, Egypt)	17–19 November 2017	24–26 November 2017

The calendar was amended from the original one for the following dates:

- Quarter-finals first leg: moved from 8–10 September to 15–17 September
- Quarter-finals second leg: moved from 15–17 September to 22–24 September
- Semi-finals second leg: moved from 13–15 October to 20–22 October

== Qualifying rounds ==
The draw for the preliminary round and first round was held on 21 December 2016 at the CAF headquarters in Cairo, Egypt. In the qualifying rounds, each tie was played on a home-and-away two-legged basis. If the aggregate score was tied after the second leg, the away goals rule would be applied, and if still tied, extra time would not be played, and the penalty shoot-out would be used to determine the winner (Regulations III. 13 & 14).

=== Preliminary round ===
Team 1	Agg.	Team 2	1st leg	2nd leg
Monrovia Club Breweries (Liberia)	3–4	(Algeria) JS Kabylie	3–0	0–4
Étoile du Congo (Republic of the Congo)	3–0	(Equatorial Guinea) Racing de Micomeseng	2–0	1–0
Ifeanyi Ubah (Nigeria)	1–1 (0–3 p)	(Egypt) Al-Masry	1–0	0–1
Defence Force (Ethiopia)	1–2	(Cameroon) Yong Sports Academy	1–0	0–2
AS Douanes Niamey (Niger)	1–3	(Morocco) IR Tanger	1–2	0–1
ASSM Elgeco Plus (Madagascar)	1–2	(South Africa) SuperSport United	0–0	1–2
Akanda (Gabon)	0–1	(Democratic Republic of the Congo) Renaissance du Congo	0–0	0–1
Bechem United (Ghana)	3–5	(Algeria) MC Alger	2–1	1–4
RSLAF (Sierra Leone)	2–1	(Nigeria) Wikki Tourists	2–0	0–1
Platinum Stars (South Africa)	2–0	(Mozambique) UD Songo	1–0	1–0
Vipers (Uganda)	1–1 (a)	(Comoros) Volcan Club	0–0	1–1
Orapa United (Botswana)	2–4	(Eswatini) Mbabane Swallows	0–1	2–3
KVZ (Zanzibar)	2–4	(Burundi) Le Messager Ngozi	2–1	0–3
APEJES Academy (Cameroon)	2–2 (a)	(Senegal) ASC Niarry Tally	1–0	1–2
Wau Salaam (South Sudan)	0–6	(Rwanda) Rayon Sports	0–4	0–2
AS SONABEL (Burkina Faso)	0–3	(Ivory Coast) SC Gagnoa	0–0	0–3
MAS Fez (Morocco)	3–2	(Republic of the Congo) CARA Brazzaville	3–0	0–2
Pamplemousses (Mauritius)	1–2	(Zimbabwe) Ngezi Platinum	1–1	0–1
Al-Hilal Al-Ubayyid (Sudan)	3–0	(Seychelles) St Michel United	2–0	1–0
Al-Hilal Benghazi (Libya)	1–1 (4–5 p)	(Kenya) Ulinzi Stars	1–0	0–1

=== First round ===
The 16 winners of the first round advanced to the play-off round, where they were joined by the 16 losers of the Champions League first round.

Team 1	Agg.	Team 2	1st leg	2nd leg
Étoile du Congo (Republic of the Congo)	0–1	(Algeria) JS Kabylie	0–0	0–1
Djoliba (Mali)	w/o (Note: FIFA suspended the Malian Football Federation on 17 March 2017. As a result, both Djoliba and Onze Créateurs could not play the second leg, and their opponents Al-Masry and Rayon Sports won on walkover.)	(Egypt) Al-Masry	2–0	—
CS Sfaxien (Tunisia)	6–1	(Cameroon) Yong Sports Academy	5–0	1–1
AS Kaloum (Guinea)	1–3	(Morocco) IR Tanger	1–0	0–3
Al-Ahly Shendi (Sudan)	3–6	(South Africa) SuperSport United	3–2	0–4
MC Alger (Algeria)	3–2	(Democratic Republic of the Congo) Renaissance du Congo	2–0	1–2
Club Africain (Tunisia)	w/o (Note: Club Africain won on walkover after RSLAF withdrew prior to the second leg.)	(Sierra Leone) RSLAF	9–1	—
Vipers (Uganda)	2–3	(South Africa) Platinum Stars	1–0	1–3
Azam (Tanzania)	1–3	(Eswatini) Mbabane Swallows	1–0	0–3
ZESCO United (Zambia)	4–2	(Burundi) Le Messager Ngozi	2–0	2–2
ASEC Mimosas (Ivory Coast)	2–1	(Cameroon) APEJES Academy	2–0	0–1
Onze Créateurs (Mali)	w/o	(Rwanda) Rayon Sports	1–0	—
MAS Fez (Morocco)	3–2	(Ivory Coast) SC Gagnoa	3–1	0–1
Recreativo do Libolo (Angola)	2–1	(Zimbabwe) Ngezi Platinum	2–1	0–0
SM Sanga Balende (Democratic Republic of the Congo)	1–1 (3–5 p)	(Sudan) Al-Hilal Al-Ubayyid	1–0	0–1
Smouha (Egypt)	4–3	(Kenya) Ulinzi Stars	4–0	0–3

=== Play-off round ===
The draw for the play-off round was held on 21 March 2017, 11:00 EET (UTC+2), at the CAF Headquarters in Cairo, Egypt. The winners of the Confederation Cup first round were drawn against the losers of the Champions League first round, with the teams from the Confederation Cup hosting the second leg.

The 16 winners of the play-off round advanced to the group stage.

Team 1	Agg.	Team 2	1st leg	2nd leg
Young Africans (Tanzania)	1–4	(Algeria) MC Alger	1–0	0–4
TP Mazembe (Democratic Republic of the Congo)	2–0	(Algeria) JS Kabylie	2–0	0–0
AC Léopards (Republic of the Congo)	3–4	(Eswatini) Mbabane Swallows	1–0	2–4
FUS Rabat (Morocco)	3–2	(Morocco) MAS Fez	2–1	1–1
Enugu Rangers (Nigeria)	2–5	(Zambia) ZESCO United	2–2	0–3
CF Mounana (Gabon)	2–1	(Ivory Coast) ASEC Mimosas	2–1	0–0
Rail Club du Kadiogo (Burkina Faso)	1–4	(Tunisia) CS Sfaxien	1–2	0–2
Bidvest Wits (South Africa)	0–1	(Egypt) Smouha	0–0	0–1
CNaPS Sport (Madagascar)	1–1 (a)	(Angola) Recreativo do Libolo	1–1	0–0
KCCA (Uganda)	1–1 (4–3 p)	(Egypt) Al-Masry	1–0	0–1
Gambia Ports Authority (The Gambia)	1–4	(Sudan) Al-Hilal Al-Ubayyid	1–1	0–3
AS Port-Louis 2000 (Mauritius)	3–6	(Tunisia) Club Africain	1–2	2–4
Rivers United (Nigeria)	2–0	(Rwanda) Rayon Sports	2–0	0–0
Barrack Young Controllers (Liberia)	1–6	(South Africa) SuperSport United	1–1	0–5
AS Tanda (Ivory Coast)	2–2 (4–5 p)	(South Africa) Platinum Stars	2–0	0–2
Horoya (Guinea)	4–3	(Morocco) IR Tanger	2–0	2–3

== Group stage ==
The draw for the group stage was held on 26 April 2017, 14:00 EET (UTC+2), at the CAF Headquarters in Cairo, Egypt. The 16 teams, all winners of the play-off round of qualifying, were drawn into four groups of four. The teams were seeded by their performances in the CAF competitions for the previous five seasons (CAF 5-year ranking points shown in parentheses).

Pot	Pot 1	Pot 2
Teams	(Democratic Republic of the Congo) TP Mazembe (58 pts); (Tunisia) CS Sfaxien (21 pts); (Zambia) ZESCO United (15 pts); (Morocco) FUS Rabat (12 pts)	(Egypt) Smouha (4 pts); (Angola) Recreativo do Libolo (2 pts); (Algeria) MC Alger; (Gabon) CF Mounana; (Guinea) Horoya; (Nigeria) Rivers United; (South Africa) Platinum Stars; (South Africa) SuperSport United; (Sudan) El-Hilal El-Obeid; (Eswatini) Mbabane Swallows; (Tunisia) Club Africain; (Uganda) KCCA

In the group stage, each group was played on a home-and-away round-robin basis. The winners and runners-up of each group advanced to the quarter-finals of the knockout stage.

Tiebreakers

The teams were ranked according to points (3 points for a win, 1 point for a draw, 0 points for a loss). If tied on points, tiebreakers were applied in the following order (Regulations III. 20 & 21):

1. Points in head-to-head matches among tied teams;
2. Goal difference in head-to-head matches among tied teams;
3. Goals scored in head-to-head matches among tied teams;
4. Away goals scored in head-to-head matches among tied teams;
5. If more than two teams are tied, and after applying all head-to-head criteria above, a subset of teams are still tied, all head-to-head criteria above are reapplied exclusively to this subset of teams;
6. Goal difference in all group matches;
7. Goals scored in all group matches;
8. Away goals scored in all group matches;
9. Drawing of lots.

=== Group A ===
Pos	Team	Pld	W	D	L	GF	GA	GD	Pts	Qualification	CAF	FUS	KCC	RIV
1	(Tunisia) Club Africain	6	4	0	2	13	6	+7	12	Quarter-finals	—	2–1	4–0	3–1
2	(Morocco) FUS Rabat	6	3	0	3	9	8	+1	9 (Note: Head-to-head results: FUS Rabat 3–0 KCCA, KCCA 3–1 FUS Rabat.)	Quarter-finals	2–1	—	3–0	2–1
3	(Uganda) KCCA	6	3	0	3	8	12	−4	9		2–1	3–1	—	2–1
4	(Nigeria) Rivers United	6	2	0	4	6	10	−4	6		0–2	1–0	2–1	—

Source: CAF

=== Group B ===
Pos	Team	Pld	W	D	L	GF	GA	GD	Pts	Qualification	CSS	MCA	MBS	PST
1	(Tunisia) CS Sfaxien	6	4	1	1	13	4	+9	13	Quarter-finals	—	4–0	1–0	3–0
2	(Algeria) MC Alger	6	3	2	1	7	7	0	11	Quarter-finals	2–1	—	2–1	2–0
3	(Eswatini) Mbabane Swallows	6	1	2	3	8	10	−2	5		1–3	0–0	—	4–2
4	(South Africa) Platinum Stars	6	0	3	3	6	13	−7	3		1–1	1–1	2–2	—

Source: CAF

=== Group C ===
Pos	Team	Pld	W	D	L	GF	GA	GD	Pts	Qualification	ZES	HLU	RLB	SMO
1	(Zambia) ZESCO United	6	3	1	2	6	5	+1	10 (Note: Head-to-head results: Al-Hilal Al-Ubayyid 1–0 ZESCO United, ZESCO United 3–0 Al-Hilal Al-Ubayyid.)	Quarter-finals	—	3–0 (awd.) (Note: FIFA suspended the Sudan Football Association on 7 July 2017. As a result, Al-Hilal Al-Ubayyid could not play their final group match against ZESCO United, and the match was awarded as a 3–0 win to their opponents. Initially, Al-Hilal Al-Ubayyid were disqualified from the CAF Confederation Cup, but following the lifting of the suspension on 13 July, they were reinstated to the competition, and advanced to the knockout stage instead of Recreativo do Libolo.)	1–0	1–0
2	(Sudan) Al-Hilal Al-Ubayyid	6	3	1	2	6	6	0	10	Quarter-finals	1–0	—	2–0	2–1
3	(Angola) Recreativo do Libolo	6	2	1	3	4	5	−1	7		3–0	1–0	—	0–0
4	(Egypt) Smouha	6	1	3	2	5	5	0	6		1–1	1–1	2–0	—

Source: CAF

=== Group D ===
Pos	Team	Pld	W	D	L	GF	GA	GD	Pts	Qualification	TPM	SSU	HOR	MOU
1	(Democratic Republic of the Congo) TP Mazembe	6	3	3	0	8	4	+4	12	Quarter-finals	—	2–2	2–1	2–0
2	(South Africa) SuperSport United	6	2	4	0	13	8	+5	10	Quarter-finals	0–0	—	2–2	4–1
3	(Guinea) Horoya	6	2	3	1	6	5	+1	9		1–1	0–0	—	1–0
4	(Gabon) CF Mounana	6	0	0	6	4	14	−10	0		0–1	3–5	0–1	—

Source: CAF

== Knockout stage ==
In the knockout stage, the eight teams played a single-elimination tournament. Each tie was played on a home-and-away two-legged basis. If the aggregate score was tied after the second leg, the away goals rule would be applied, and if still tied, extra time would not be played, and the penalty shoot-out would be used to determine the winner (Regulations III. 26 & 27).

=== Bracket ===
Quarter-finals
(Sudan) Al-Hilal Al-Ubayyid	1	0	1
(Democratic Republic of the Congo) TP Mazembe	2	5	7
(Morocco) FUS Rabat	1	0	1 (5 p)
(Tunisia) CS Sfaxien	0	1	1 (4 p)
(South Africa) SuperSport United	0	2	2 (a)
(Zambia) ZESCO United	0	2	2
(Algeria) MC Alger	1	0	1
(Tunisia) Club Africain	0	2	2

Semi-finals
(Democratic Republic of the Congo) TP Mazembe	1	0	1
(Morocco) FUS Rabat	0	0	0
(South Africa) SuperSport United	1	3	4
(Tunisia) Club Africain	1	1	2

Final
(Democratic Republic of the Congo) TP Mazembe	2	0	2
(South Africa) SuperSport United	1	0	1

=== Quarter-finals ===
In the quarter-finals, the winners of one group played the runners-up of another group, with the group winners hosting the second leg.

Team 1	Agg.	Team 2	1st leg	2nd leg
MC Alger (Algeria)	1–2	(Tunisia) Club Africain	1−0	0–2
SuperSport United (South Africa)	2–2 (a)	(Zambia) ZESCO United	0−0	2–2
FUS Rabat (Morocco)	1–1 (5–4 p)	(Tunisia) CS Sfaxien	1−0	0−1
Al-Hilal Al-Ubayyid (Sudan)	1–7	(Democratic Republic of the Congo) TP Mazembe	1−2	0–5

=== Semi-finals ===
In the semi-finals, the four quarter-final winners played in two ties, with the order of legs decided by an additional draw held after the group stage draw.

Team 1	Agg.	Team 2	1st leg	2nd leg
SuperSport United (South Africa)	4−2	(Tunisia) Club Africain	1−1	3−1
TP Mazembe (Democratic Republic of the Congo)	1−0	(Morocco) FUS Rabat	1−0	0−0

=== Final ===
In the final, the two semi-final winners played each other, with the order of legs decided by an additional draw held after the group stage draw.

19 November 2017
15:30 UTC+2

TP Mazembe (Democratic Republic of the Congo)	2–1	(South Africa) SuperSport United
Traoré 19'; Adjei 67'	Report	Mbule 48'

Stade TP Mazembe, Lubumbashi
Attendance: 19,000
Referee: Mehdi Abid Charef (Algeria)
25 November 2017
20:15 UTC+2

SuperSport United (South Africa)	0–0	(Democratic Republic of the Congo) TP Mazembe
	Report

Lucas Masterpieces Moripe Stadium, Pretoria
Attendance: 15,000
Referee: Malang Diedhiou (Senegal)

TP Mazembe won 2–1 on aggregate.

== Top goalscorers ==
Team eliminated / inactive for this round.

Rank	Player	Team	MD1	MD2	MD3	MD4	MD5	MD6	QF1	QF2	SF1	SF2	F1	F2	Total
1	(Democratic Republic of the Congo) Ben Malango	(Democratic Republic of the Congo) TP Mazembe		1	1				1	1	1				6
2	(New Zealand) Jeremy Brockie	(South Africa) SuperSport United		2				2				1			5
2	(Eswatini) Sabelo Ndzinisa	(Eswatini) Mbabane Swallows		4				1							5
2	(Algeria) Hichem Nekkache	(Algeria) MC Alger		1		2	1		1						5
5	(Tunisia) Saber Khalifa	(Tunisia) Club Africain						1		1	1	1			4
5	(South Africa) Thabo Mnyamane	(South Africa) SuperSport United		2				1			1				4
7	(Tunisia) Karim Aouadhi	(Tunisia) CS Sfaxien		1	1					1					3
7	(Tunisia) Firas Chaouat	(Tunisia) CS Sfaxien					1	2							3
7	(Cameroon) Jean Francis Ebélé Dipita	(Guinea) Horoya	1	1				1							3
7	(Morocco) Mohamed Fouzair	(Morocco) FUS Rabat			1	1		1							3
7	(South Africa) Bradley Grobler	(South Africa) SuperSport United						1				2			3
7	(Tunisia) Manoubi Haddad	(Tunisia) Club Africain					1	2							3
7	(Uganda) Derrick Nsibambi	(Uganda) KCCA		1	2										3
7	(South Africa) Thuso Phala	(South Africa) SuperSport United	1							2					3

== See also ==
- 2017 CAF Champions League
- 2018 CAF Super Cup
