= Morne Nel =

South African footballer

Personal information
- Full name: Morne Peter Nel
- Date of birth: 23 May 1996 (age 30)
- Place of birth: Cape Town, South Africa
- Height: 1.84 m (6 ft 0 in)
- Position: Midfielder

Team information
- Current team: Ajax Cape Town
- Number: 6

Youth career
- –2013: Old Mutual Academy

Senior career*
Years	Team	Apps	(Gls)
2013–	SuperSport United	31	(0)
2017–	→ Ajax Cape Town	0	(0)

International career
2012	South Africa U-17	1	(1)
2012–2015	South Africa U-20	4	(0)
2015	South Africa U-23	1	(0)
- * Club domestic league appearances and goals as of 11 December 2017

Morne Peter Nel (born 23 May 1996) is a South African footballer who plays as a midfielder for Ajax Cape Town on loan from SuperSport United in the Premier Soccer League.

== Club career ==
=== Old Mutual Academy ===
Nel played his youth football at Old Mutual Academy in Cape Town, and captained the team.

=== SuperSport United ===
Nel joined SuperSport United in May 2013, after attracting interest also from Ajax Cape Town and Mamelodi Sundowns. He impressed and assisted the second goal in SuperSport United's 2–0 win in a pre-season friendly against Manchester City.

In September 2013, along with Denwin Farmer, Zama Rambuwane and Kabelo Seriba, Nel trained in England with Tottenham Hotspur Youth. He impressed in training and was selected to play for Tottenham Hotspur in a friendly against Ipswich Town.

In November 2013, Nel made his league debut in a match against Lamontville Golden Arrows.

In January 2015, there were negotiations regarding Nel transferring to Tottenham Hotspur after impressing at another trial, but in the end he stayed with SuperSport.

In June 2015, SuperSport United signed Nel on a two-year extension.

At the end of November 2015, Nel trialled with Portuguese club Vitória de Guimarães.

==== Loan to Ajax Cape Town ====
In August 2017, Nel joined Ajax Cape Town on a one-year loan, with an option for a permanent move.

== International career ==
Nel played for the South Africa U17 squad in the 2013 African U-17 Championship qualifiers scoring a goal in the first leg against Ghana.

In November 2012, Nel was called up to the South Africa U20 squad for the 2012 Zone VI Games. After a year, when he was unavailable due to club commitments, Nel re-joined the South Africa U20 squad for the 2015 African Youth Championship qualifiers in August 2014 and played in both legs against Cameroon. He was called up as part of the final 21-man squad for the tournament in March 2015, but was not released by his club to take part in the training camp. In the group stage he played two matches against Ghana and Mali and was an unused substitute against Zambia.

In September 2015, Nel was called up to the South Africa U23s ahead of a double-header against Tunisia, playing in the second match.

Nel was selected in the senior team preliminary squad for the 2016 CHAN qualifier against Angola on 17 October 2015, but was not picked for the match-day squad.
