= Thuso =

Thuso is an Sesotho name meaning help. Notable people with the name include:

- Thuso Mbedu, South African actress
- Thuso Mpuang, South African sprinter
- Thuso Phala, South African soccer player
