= Phola =

Phola may refer to:

- Ogies, South Africa
- Phola, Mpumalanga, South Africa
- Phola (Aetolia), Greece
- Phola language, a dialect cluster of the Loloish languages spoken by the Phula people of China
- Phola (album), an album by Hugh Masekela
- Phola (beetle), a genus of leaf beetles
