= Kafka's Ape =

Kafka's Ape is a 2015 stage adaptation by Phala O. Phala of Franz Kafka's short story "A Report to an Academy". The play with solo actor Tony Bonani Miyambo was featured at the 2015 South Africa National Arts Festival where it won the Silver Ovation Award. The play has since won more awards and critical acclaim, including the Humanities and Social Sciences 2018 Awards for Best Public Performance.

== Social significance ==
Kafka's Ape stands out from other adaptations of "A Report to an Academy" in that Tony Miyambo is only the second black actor to play the role of the Ape, Red Peter, a trait that on its own can conjure uncomfortable and important historical and political connotations. These connotations coupled with the current and historical context of South Africa's history of Apartheid and active xenophobia have led the significance to extend beyond Kafka's original allegories of Jewish diaspora into one about the differences between us all, the struggle to fit in, and the concept of freedom. Miyambo describes his analysis of the play's importance in an interview with POWER 98.7 by saying,

"This ape speaks about xenophobia, about homophobia, how one is uncomfortable in their own skin. He is a performing ape, but he is not performing because he wants to, he speaks about this as a way out. He wonders what true freedom is, we are all fighting for our freedom....There is only one other black man who has played this role, Sello Maake ka-Ncube. It is an uncomfortable thought for many people – a black man playing an ape. But this is about just that – the play is an allegorical observation of South African society through the eyes of others. Kafka’s Ape presents a conflicting point of view in which traditional boundaries, categories and norms are questioned, in which beauty, harmony and symmetry are usurped by cruelty, dissonance and abnormality. It highlights the complexities of identity in post-apartheid South Africa and the human race in general."

== Staging ==
Original design has been accredited to Liesel Retief who uses a minimalist set and prop list allowing the focus to be on the acting and aiming to leave the audience with a sense of the emptiness communicated in the play.

== Tours ==
Since its debut in 2015, Kafka's Ape has toured across South Africa and went to Chicago in February 2018. In 2019 it will be going on tour internationally including Europe and the States.

A reviewer for WeekendSpecial said, "This performance deserves full houses and long runs wherever it goes".
