= Phola (Aetolia) =

Phola (Ancient Greek: Φόλα) was a town and polis (city-state) of ancient Aetolia. It is known only through epigraphic testimony among which we can highlight two funerary inscriptions of the classical period and other inscriptions of the Hellenistic period reference a strategos and a scribe (grammateos) from Phola. From this evidence it is deduced that Phola had the status of a polis.

Its exact location is unknown.
