= Bolaji Sakin =

Association football player (born 1993)

Personal information
- Full name: Bolaji Simeon Sakin
- Date of birth: February 24, 1993 (age 33)
- Place of birth: Abidjan, Ivory Coast
- Height: 1.84 m (6 ft 0 in)
- Position: Forward

Team information
- Current team: Chabab SC Ghazieh
- Number: 12

Youth career
- 2010-2011: Ijayapi Rock FC

Senior career*
Years	Team	Apps	(Gls)
2011-2012	Kwara United F.C.	21	(8)
2012-2013	Wikki Tourists	29	(9)
2013-2014	Dolphins F.C.	29	(11)
2015-2017	Abia Warriors FC	42	(21)
2017	Rivers United FC	29	(9)
2017-	Horoya AC	35	(14)
2026-	Chabab SC Ghazieh	-	(-)
- * Club domestic league appearances and goals

Bolaji Simeon Sakin (born February 24, 1993) is a Nigerian football player currently with Ghazieh، Lebanon side Chabab SC Ghazieh

== Career ==
=== Youth ===
Sakin was born in Abidjan, Ivory Coast. At an early age, he arrived in Nigeria where he joined youth club Ijayapi Rock FC in Abuja.

=== Kwara United FC ===
Sakin began his professional career with Kwara United F.C. during the 2011/2012 season.

=== Wikki Tourists ===
Simeon then joined Wikki Tourists during the 2012/2013 season and joined Dolphins F.C. after a season.

=== Abia Warriors FC ===
Simeon joined Abia Warriors FC in January 2015 where he was instrumental at the club and attracted interest from rivals Rivers United FC.

=== Rivers United FC ===
On 1 January 2017, Sakin signed for Nigeria Professional Football League side Rivers United FC for an undisclosed fee, agreeing a two-year contract with the club.

While at Rivers United he appeared in the 2017 CAF Confederations Cup, scoring goals against Uganda's KCCA and Morocco's FUS Rabat in otherwise losing efforts.

=== Horoya AC ===
On 12 November 2017, it was announced that Sakin had signed a 4-year contract at Guinean club Horoya AC.

He scored his first goal in CAF Champions League on August 17, 2018 against AS Togo-Port in 2018 CAF Champions League group stage.

== Honours ==
- Ligue 1 Nimba Mining : 2018
- Guinée Coupe Nationale : 2018
- Guinée Super Cup : 2018
