= Siyabonga Nhlapo =

South African soccer player

Personal information
- Date of birth: 23 December 1988 (age 37)
- Place of birth: Soweto, South Africa
- Height: 1.80 m (5 ft 11 in)
- Positions: Midfielder; right back

Team information
- Current team: Marumo Gallants
- Number: 50

Youth career
- Vutech FC

Senior career*
| Years | Team | Apps | (Gls) |
| 2010–2013 | Jomo Cosmos | | |
| 2013–2017 | Bidvest Wits | 75 | (0) |
| 2017 | → Highlands Park (loan) | 14 | (0) |
| 2017–2023 | Supersport United | 118 | (1) |
| 2023–2024 | Chippa United | 10 | (0) |
| 2024– | Marumo Gallants | 26 | (0) |

International career^{‡}
| 2014–2015 | South Africa | 11 | (0) |
- * Club domestic league appearances and goals as of 4 January 2026 ‡ National team caps and goals as of 1 April 2024

Siyabonga Nhlapo (born 23 December 1988) is a South African professional soccer player who plays as a midfielder for Marumo Gallants in the Premier Soccer League.
