= Thabo Mnyamane =

South African soccer player

Personal information
- Date of birth: 17 August 1992 (age 34)
- Position: Forward

Senior career*
Years	Team	Apps	(Gls)
2013–2015	University of Pretoria	70	(16)
2015–2020	SuperSport United	47	(10)
2020–2022	TTM/Marumo Gallants	36	(2)

International career^{‡}
2015–2017	South Africa	3	(1)
- * Club domestic league appearances and goals as of 16 August 2024 ‡ National team caps and goals as of 16 August 2024

Thabo Mnyamane (born 17 August 1992) is a South African soccer player who played as a forward in the South African Premier Division. He was also capped for South Africa.

Mnyamane hails from Sebokeng. He attended the North-West University at Mahikeng and trained with the North-West University Soccer Institute. In 2013, he was discovered in the Varsity Football tournament and signed by the University of Pretoria, completing his studies in 2013 and joining the "Tuks" in 2014. His degree was in sports management. Making his first-tier debut in the 2013-14 South African Premier Division, he quickly made his mark at the Tuks, among others scoring the only goal of the match against Platinum Stars in February 2014.

In the spring of 2015, Mnyamane was selected for Bafana Bafana. He scored on his debut against Eswatini. He was called up again in 2017, to the squad that played two friendlies against Guinea-Bissau and Angola. He played the one against Guinea-Bissau.

After the University of Pretoria were relegated to the second tier in 2016, Mnyamane moved on to SuperSport United. He scored a handful of goals in the 2016–17 season, as well as in the CAF Confederation Cup, but thought he could do better.

In 2017–18 his goalscoring count dropped in the league, as SuperSport United as a whole struggled to find the net, but he did score twice against Petro de Luanda to put SuperSport United through from the 2018 CAF Confederation Cup qualifying rounds. His career then came to a halt in the 2018–19 and 2019–20 seasons. After playing just 3 league games in 2019, Mnyamane was released in the summer of 2020. During his time at SuperSport United, they won the 2016–17 Nedbank Cup, the 2017 MTN 8 and the 2019 MTN 8.

After two years with Marumo Gallants (changing its identity from Tshakhuma Tsha Madzivhandila) he was released from that club in 2022. In autumn 2023, he trained with the University of Pretoria, and also became an analyst for the University of Pretoria Women's F.C.
