= Hichem Nekkache =

Algerian footballer (born 1991)

Personal information
- Full name: Mohamed Hichem Nekkache
- Date of birth: March 7, 1991 (age 35)
- Place of birth: Algiers, Algeria
- Height: 1.79 m (5 ft 10 in)
- Position: Forward

Senior career*
Years	Team	Apps	(Gls)
2011–2014	Paradou AC	–	(–)
2014–2015	MC Oran	25	(4)
2015–2016	CR Belouizdad	30	(8)
2016–2020	MC Alger	101	(21)
2020–2021	MC Oran	52	(10)
2021–2022	CS Sfaxien	22	(1)
2022–	Al-Muharraq SC	–	(−)
- * Club domestic league appearances and goals

Mohamed Hichem Nekkache (born March 7, 1991) is an Algerian professional footballer who plays as a forward.

== Career statistics ==
As of 22 September 2018

Club	Season	League			Cup		Other		Continental		Total	
Club	Season	Division	Apps	Goals	Apps	Goals	Apps	Goals	Apps	Goals	Apps	Goals
Club		League			Cup (Note: Includes the Algerian Cup)		Other (Note: Includes the Super Cup)		Africa (Note: Includes the CAF Champions League and CAF Confederation Cup)		Total	
MC Oran	2014–15	Ligue 1	25	4	3	2	—		—		28	6
CR Belouizdad	2015–16	Ligue 1	29	8	2	0	—		—		31	8
MC Alger	2016–17	Ligue 1	23	7	4	0	—		10 (Note: All appearance(s) in CAF Confederation Cup)	4	37	10
MC Alger	2017–18	Ligue 1	28	4	3	3	—		4 (Note: Two appearances and one goal in 2017 CAF Confederation Cup, Two appearances and four goal in 2018 CAF Champions League)	5	35	12
MC Alger	2018–19	Ligue 1	5	3	0	0	—		5 (Note: All appearance(s) in CAF Champions League)	0	10	3
MC Alger	Total		56	13	7	3	—		19	9	82	25
Career total			110	26	12	5	—		19	9	141	40
