= Denwin Farmer =

South African soccer player

Personal information
- Full name: Denwin Aldrige Keith Farmer
- Date of birth: 19 September 1996 (age 30)
- Place of birth: Port Elizabeth, South Africa
- Height: 1.82 m (6 ft 0 in)
- Positions: Centre-back; left-back

Team information
- Current team: Cape Town Spurs
- Number: 44

Youth career
- –2015: SuperSport United

Senior career*
Years	Team	Apps	(Gls)
2015–2018	SuperSport United	21	(1)
2018–2019	Maritzburg United	2	(0)
2019–2022	Baroka	50	(3)
2022–2023	Sekhukhune United	3	(0)
2024–	Cape Town Spurs	2	(0)

International career^{‡}
2015	South Africa U23	1	(0)
2021	South Africa	1	(0)
- * Club domestic league appearances and goals as of 23 April 2024 ‡ National team caps and goals as of 23 April 2024

Denwin Aldrige Keith Farmer (born 19 September 1996) is a South African soccer player who plays as a centre-back or as a left-back for Cape Town Spurs in the Premier Soccer League.

He started his senior career in SuperSport United. He was born in Port Elizabeth.

== International career ==
He has played for the South Africa national under-23 team at the 2015 Africa U-23 Cup of Nations.

He made his debut for South Africa national soccer team on 10 June 2021 in a friendly against Uganda.
