= Manoubi Haddad =

French association football player (born 1996)

Personal information
- Date of birth: 23 August 1996 (age 30)
- Place of birth: Clamart, France
- Height: 1.68 m (5 ft 6 in)
- Position: Attacking midfielder

Team information
- Current team: Soliman

Youth career
- –2014: Le Havre

Senior career*
Years	Team	Apps	(Gls)
2014	Le Havre B	1	(0)
2014–2015	Amiens	0	(0)
2016–2017	Olympique Béja	10	(3)
2017–2020	Club Africain	51	(3)
2020–2022	Quevilly-Rouen	50	(6)
2022	Quevilly-Rouen B	1	(0)
2022	Paris 13 Atletico	2	(0)
2024–	Soliman	48	(3)
- * Club domestic league appearances and goals as of 08:45, 4 August 2026 (UTC)

Manoubi Haddad (Arabic: منوبي الحداد; born 23 August 1996) is a French professional footballer who plays as an attacking midfielder for Soliman.

== Career ==
Haddad started his career with Le Havre, making one appearance for their B side in the Championnat National 3 in May 2014. After a spell at Amiens, Haddad joined Tunisian Ligue Professionnelle 1 side Olympique Béja, making his professional debut in September 2016 in a 2–0 loss to ES Tunis. In January 2017, he joined Club Africain on a four-and-a-half-year deal. In January 2020, Haddad left Club Africain and went on trial with Dundee United the following month. On 28 July 2020, Haddad signed for Championnat National side Quevilly-Rouen.

== Personal life ==
Born in France, Haddad is of Tunisian descent.
