= Daniel Nii Adjei =

Ghanaian footballer (born 1988)

Personal information
- Full name: Daniel Nii Adjei
- Date of birth: 17 June 1988 (age 38)
- Place of birth: Kumasi, Ghana
- Height: 1.75 m (5 ft 9 in)
- Position: Midfielder

Team information
- Current team: Elmina Sharks
- Number: 6

Senior career*
Years	Team	Apps	(Gls)
2006–2007	Norchip Sepe	–	(–)
2007–2012	Asante Kotoko	–	(–)
2012–2017	TP Mazembe	165	(25)
2018	Wydad AC	1	(0)
2018–2019	Asante Kotoko	0	(0)
2020	King Faisal	7	(0)
2020–	Elmina Sharks	17	(0)

International career
2012–2015	Ghana	2	(0)
- * Club domestic league appearances and goals

Daniel Nii Adjei (born 17 June 1988) is a Ghanaian professional footballer who plays as a midfielder for Elmina Sharks FC. He is a former player of TP Mazembe, Wydad Athletic Club and Asante Kotoko S.C. and Kumasi King Faisal.

== Club career ==
=== Asante Kotoko ===
Between 2007 and 2012, Adjei played for Kumasi-based club Asante Kotoko. He rose become the captain of the side before departing in November 2012.

=== TP Mazembe ===
Adjei played for TP Mazembe from November 2012 to 2017. He was a member of the team that participated in the 2015 FIFA Club World Cup after TP Mazembe had been crowned champions of Africa after winning the CAF Champions League in 2015. During this competition organized in Japan, he played in the match against Club América which ended in a 2–1 win. After playing for the Kinshasa club for 5 seasons, he left the club in December 2017, after his contract with the club expired.

=== Elmina Sharks ===
In October 2020, Adjei signed for Ghana premier league team Elmina Sharks for a one-year contract ahead of the 2020–21 season.

== International career ==
Adjei has received two caps for the Ghana national football team, the Black Stars.

He played his first match on 13 October 2012, against Malawi, during the CAN 2013 qualifiers which ended in a 0–1 victory for Ghana. He played his second match on 1 September 2015 in a friendly match against Congo which also ended in a 2–1 victory.

== Honours ==
Asante Kotoko

- Ghana Premier League: 2008, 2011–12, 2012–13
- Ghana Super Cup: 2012
- GFA Normalization Competition: 2019

TP Mazembe

- DR Congo Championship : 2013, 2013–14, 2015–16, 2016–17
- DR Congo Super Cup : 2013, 2014, 2016
- CAF Champions League : 2015
- Confederation Cup : 2016, 2017, runner up:2013
- CAF Super Cup : 2016, runner up : 2017

Wydad Athletic Club

- CAF Super Cup : 2018

Individual

- Ghana Premier League Player of the season: 2011–12
