= Sipho Mbule =

South African soccer player

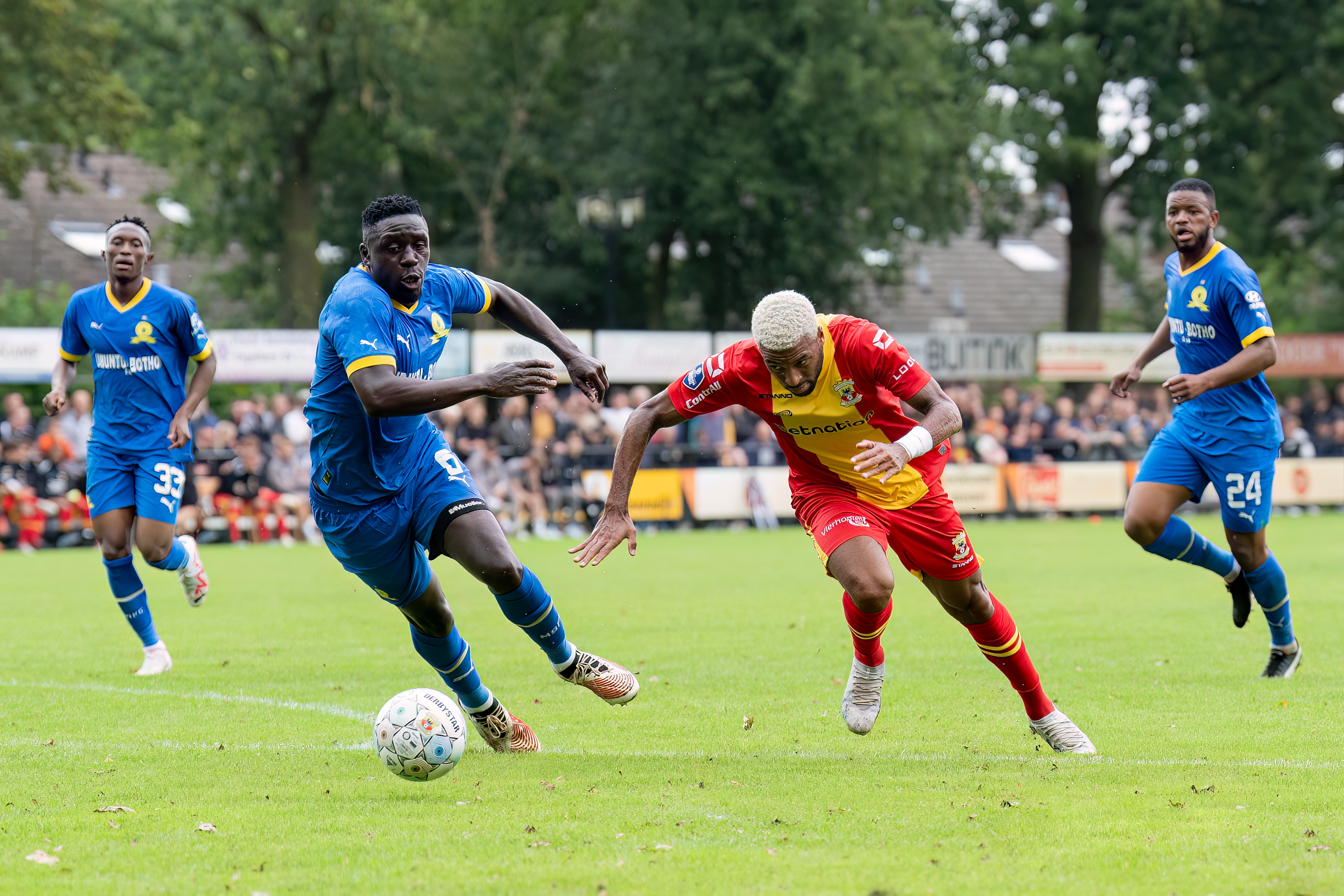

Personal information
- Full name: Sipho Percevale Mbule
- Date of birth: 22 March 1998 (age 28)
- Place of birth: Bethlehem, South Africa
- Height: 1.77 m (5 ft 9 1/2 in)
- Position: Central midfielder

Team information
- Current team: Zakho
- Number: 23

Youth career
- Harmony Sports Academy
- –2017: SuperSport United

Senior career*
Years	Team	Apps	(Gls)
2017–2022	SuperSport United	84	(9)
2022–2025	Mamelodi Sundowns	36	(2)
2024–2025	→ Sekhukhune United (loan)	15	(2)
2025–2026	Orlando Pirates	7	(0)
2026–	Zakho	11	(1)

International career^{‡}
2017	South Africa U20	5	(0)
2019	South Africa U23	3	(0)
2017–	South Africa	4	(0)
- * Club domestic league appearances and goals as of 8 November 2026 ‡ National team caps and goals as of 05 September 2025

Sipho Percevale Mbule also known as The Master Chef (born 22 March 1998) is a South African professional soccer player who plays as a central midfielder for Iraqi Football side Zakho.

== Career ==
Mbule was born in Bethlehem in the province of Free State. He started his youth career at Harmony Sports Academy in 2013, alongside Teboho Mokoena, before joining SuperSport United's academy. He made his senior debut for SuperSport United in August 2017.

Mbule has trained with the South Africa national under-17 team, and has represented the South Africa under-20, under-23 and senior international teams.

== International career ==
On 1 December 2025, Mbule was called up to the South Africa squad for the 2025 Africa Cup of Nations.
