= Issama Mpeko =

Congolese footballer (born 1986)

Personal information
- Full name: Djo Issama Mpeko
- Date of birth: 3 March 1986 (age 40)
- Place of birth: Mbandaka, Zaire
- Height: 1.73 m (5 ft 8 in)
- Position: Right-back

Team information
- Current team: FC Saint-Éloi Lupopo
- Number: 32

Senior career*
Years	Team	Apps	(Gls)
2006–2009	FC Lumière		
2009–2011	Motema Pembe		
2011–2014	AS Vita		
2014–2015	Kabuscorp S.C.P	24	(1)
2015–2023	TP Mazembe	250	(15)
2023–2024	AS Vita Club	4	(0)
2024–	FC Saint-Éloi Lupopo		

International career^{‡}
2011–	DR Congo	81	(2)
- * Club domestic league appearances and goals ‡ National team caps and goals as of 18 February 2026

Djo Issama Mpeko (born 3 March 1986) is a Congolese professional footballer who plays as a right-back for Linafoot club FC Saint-Éloi Lupopo and the DR Congo national team.

He played for Democratic Republic of the Congo in the 2011 African Nations Championship. During the 2013 Africa Cup of Nations qualification he scored one goal, and went forward to Casablanca in 2013.

== Honors ==
DR Congo

- Africa Cup of Nations bronze: 2015
