= Thuso Phala =

South African soccer player

Personal information
- Date of birth: 27 May 1986 (age 40)
- Place of birth: Soweto, South Africa
- Height: 1.70 m (5 ft 7 in)
- Position: Right winger

Youth career
- Wits University
- Silver Stars

Senior career*
Years	Team	Apps	(Gls)
2006–2007	Silver Stars	17	(0)
2007–2009	Kaizer Chiefs	32	(1)
2009–2010	Mamelodi Sundowns	5	(0)
2010–2013	Platinum Stars	81	(12)
2013–2019	SuperSport United	141	(20)
2019–2020	Black Leopards	12	(0)

International career
2012–2016	South Africa	22	(2)
- * Club domestic league appearances and goals

Thuso Phala (born 27 May 1986) is a retired South African football midfielder.

== International career ==
Since making his debut for the South Africa national football team in 2010, Phala appeared at the 2013 and 2015 Africa Cup of Nations. He scored Bafana Bafana's opening goal of the 2015 tournament in a 3–1 loss to Algeria.

=== International goals ===
#	Date	Venue	Opponent	Score	Result	Competition
1	4 January 2015	Orlando Stadium, South Africa	Zambia	1–0	1–0	International Friendly
2	19 January 2015	Estadio de Mongomo, Equatorial Guinea	Algeria	1–0	1–3	2015 African Cup of Nations
