= 2010–11 CR Belouizdad season =

CR Belouizdad
2010–11 season
- Chairman: Mahfoud Kerbadj
- Head coach: Miguel Angel Gamondi (until 7 July 2010)
- Stadium: Stade 20 Août 1955
- Ligue 1: 5th
- Algerian Cup: Quarter-finals
- Top goalscorer: League: Ramzi Bourakba (10); Islam Slimani (10); All: Islam Slimani (11)

In the 2010–11 season, CR Belouizdad competed in the Ligue 1 for the 45th season, as well as the Algerian Cup.

== Squad list ==
Players and squad numbers last updated on 18 November 2010.
Note: Flags indicate national team as has been defined under FIFA eligibility rules. Players may hold more than one non-FIFA nationality.

No.	Nat.	Position	Name	Date of birth (age)	Signed from
Goalkeepers
1	(Algeria)	GK	Mohamed Ousserir	5 February 1978 (aged 32)	(Algeria) NA Hussein Dey
25	(Algeria)	GK	Nadjib Ghoul	12 September 1985 (aged 25)	(Algeria) USM Alger
16	(Algeria)	GK	Hamza Dahmane	22 September 1990 (aged 20)	(Algeria) Youth system
Defenders
	(Algeria)		Omar Selimi	21 October 1987 (aged 23)	(Algeria) ASO Chlef
4	(Algeria)		Abdelkrim Mammeri	12 January 1981 (aged 29)	(Algeria) WA Boufarik
24	(Algeria)		Khalil Boukedjane	27 January 1981 (aged 29)	(Algeria) RC Kouba
20	(Algeria)		Amine Aksas	5 March 1983 (aged 27)	(Algeria) ES Sétif
2	(Algeria)		Fayçal Abdat	20 October 1986 (aged 24)	(Algeria) USM El Harrach
21	(Algeria)		Mohamed Herida	28 March 1988 (aged 22)	(Algeria) Youth system
26	(Algeria)		Nadjib Maaziz	4 May 1989 (aged 21)	(Algeria) Youth system
8	(Algeria)		Billel Benaldjia	23 August 1988 (aged 22)	(Algeria) USM Alger
22	(Algeria)		Lyes Boukria	9 September 1981 (aged 29)	(Algeria) JS Kabylie
5	(Algeria)		Soufyane Mebarki	13 May 1986 (aged 24)	(Algeria) IRB Maghnia
Midfielders
29	(Algeria)		Mohamed Lahmar Abbou	18 August 1986 (aged 24)	(Algeria) RC Rélizane
17	(Algeria)		Mohamed El Amine Aouad	20 September 1984 (aged 26)	(Algeria) ASM Oran
28	(Algeria)		Amar Ammour	10 September 1976 (aged 34)	(Algeria) MC Alger
6	(Algeria)		Ahmed Mekehout	4 April 1983 (aged 27)	(Algeria) USM Annaba
10	(Algeria)		Hocine Harrouche	9 December 1987 (aged 23)	(Algeria) Paradou AC
13	(Algeria)		Merouane Anane	31 May 1990 (aged 20)	(Algeria) Youth system
14	(Algeria)		Djafer Khellaf	18 November 1984 (aged 26)	(Algeria) CS Constantine
12	(Algeria)		Mohamed Ismail Kherbache	1 July 1990 (aged 20)	(Algeria) Youth system
	(Algeria)		Nassim Baâ	25 March 1990 (aged 20)	(Algeria) Youth system
Forwards
7	(Algeria)		Ibrahim Bousehaba	2 December 1985 (aged 25)	(Algeria) US Remchi
18	(Algeria)		Aboubaker Rebih	18 December 1983 (aged 27)	(Algeria) USM Annaba
23	(Algeria)		Youcef Saïbi	22 August 1982 (aged 28)	(Algeria) USM El Harrach
19	(Algeria)		Ramzi Bourakba	20 December 1984 (aged 26)	(Algeria) USM El Harrach
	(Algeria)		Fouad Lahouamed	1 July 1990 (aged 20)	(Algeria) ?
9	(Algeria)		Islam Slimani	18 June 1988 (aged 22)	(Algeria) JSM Chéraga
	(Algeria)		Imad Bendif	24 December 1991 (aged 19)	(Algeria) Youth system

== Competitions ==
=== Overview ===
Competition	Record								Started round	Final position / round	First match	Last match
Competition	G	W	D	L	GF	GA	GD	Win %	Started round	Final position / round	First match	Last match
Ligue 1	30	12	9	9	33	26	+7	40.00	—N/a	5th	25 September 2010	8 July 2011
Algerian Cup	4	2	1	1	7	5	+2	50.00	Round of 64	Quarter-final	29 December 2010	8 April 2011
Total	34	14	10	10	40	31	+9	41.18				

Updated to match played 3 June 2019
Source: Competitions

=== Ligue 1 ===
==== League table ====
Pos	Team	Pld	W	D	L	GF	GA	GD	Pts	Qualification or relegation
3	ES Sétif	30	12	11	7	43	31	+12	47	Qualification for the Confederation Cup preliminary round
4	USM El Harrach	30	12	10	8	36	31	+5	46	
5	CR Belouizdad	30	12	9	9	33	26	+7	45	
6	MC Saïda	30	11	9	10	33	35	−2	42	
7	MC Oran	30	11	8	11	26	27	−1	41	

Updated to match(es) played on 19 April 2018. Source: DZFoot
Rules for classification: 1) points; 2) head-to-head points; 3) head-to-head goal difference; 4) goal difference; 5) total goals; 6) fairplay ranking; 7) playoff.

==== Results summary ====
Overall								Home						Away					
Pld	W	D	L	GF	GA	GD	Pts	W	D	L	GF	GA	GD	W	D	L	GF	GA	GD
30	12	9	9	33	26	+7	45	10	3	2	24	8	+16	2	6	7	9	18	−9

Last updated: 22 April 2018.
Source: Competitive matches

==== Results by round ====
Round	1	2	3	4	5	6	7	8	9	10	11	12	13	14	15	16	17	18	19	20	21	22	23	24	25	26	27	28	29	30
Ground	A	H	A	H	A	H	A	A	H	A	H	A	H	A	H	H	A	H	A	H	A	H	H	A	H	A	H	A	H	A
Result	L	W	D	W	D	W	W	L	W	L	L	D	W	D	D	W	D	W	D	D	W	W	W	L	W	L	D	L	L	L
Position	11	5	9	7	7	5	3	4	3	5	7	6	6	7	7	3	3	3	4	4	3	3	2	2	2	2	2	2	3	5

Source: Competitive matches
A = Away; H = Home; W = Win; D = Draw; L = Loss

=== Matches ===
Win Draw Loss

25 September 2010 Round 1	MC Saïda	2–1	CR Belouizdad	Saida
17:00	Touaoula 17'; Fenier 22'	Soccerway report	Slimani 90+2'	Stadium: April 13, 1958 Stadium; Referee: Farid Bahloul

2 October 2010 Round 2	CR Belouizdad	3–1	MC El Eulma	Belouizdad
17:00	Rebih 14'; Bourakba 73', 87'	Soccerway report	Aksas 54' (o.g.)	Stadium: Stade 20 Août 1955; Referee: Mohamed Benouza

23 November 2010 Round 3	JS Kabylie	1–1	CR Belouizdad	Tizi Ouzou
14:30	Aoudia 47'	Soccerway report	Bourakba 72'	Stadium: Stade 1er Novembre 1954; Referee: Mehdi Abid Charef

23 October 2010 Round 4	CR Belouizdad	2–1	MC Alger	Belouizdad
16:00	Bourakba 16', 60'	Soccerway report	Younès 52'	Stadium: Stade 20 Août 1955; Referee: Sofiane Bousseter

26 October 2010 Round 5	AS Khroub	0–0	CR Belouizdad	El Khroub
17:00		Soccerway report		Stadium: Stade Abed Hamdani; Referee: Mohamed Bouhenni

30 October 2010 Round 6	CR Belouizdad	2–1	MC Oran	Belouizdad
17:00	Bourakba 9', 54'	Soccerway report	Berradja 3'	Stadium: Stade 20 Août 1955; Referee: Rafik Achouri

6 November 2010 Round 7	USM Blida	0–1	CR Belouizdad	Blida
14:30		Soccerway report	Rebih 42'	Stadium: Stade Mustapha Tchaker; Referee: Farid Bahloul

12 November 2010 Round 8	CA Bordj Bou Arreridj	2–1	CR Belouizdad	Bordj Bou Arréridj
19:30	Bensaïd 27'; Bakha 71' (pen.)	Soccerway report	Slimani 14'	Stadium: Stade 20 Août 1955; Referee: Mohamed Benouza

27 November 2010 Round 9	CR Belouizdad	2–1	ASO Chlef	Belouizdad
14:30	Slimani 31'; Bourakba 37'	Soccerway report	Zaoui 68'	Stadium: Stade 20 Août 1955; Referee: Mokhtar Amalou

3 December 2010 Round 10	USM Annaba	1–0	CR Belouizdad	Annaba
15:00	Boukhari 48'	Soccerway report		Stadium: May 19, 1956 Stadium; Referee: Boubekeur Zouaoui

11 December 2010 Round 11	CR Belouizdad	0–1	USM El Harrach	Belouizdad
14:30		Soccerway report	Boumechra 5' (pen.)	Stadium: Stade 20 Août 1955; Referee: Sofiane Bousseter

4 January 2011 Round 12	USM Alger	0–0	CR Belouizdad	Bologhine
18:00		Soccerway report		Stadium: Omar Hamadi Stadium; Referee: Farouk Mial

24 December 2010 Round 13	CR Belouizdad	1–0	WA Tlemcen	Belouizdad
15:00	Herida 38'	Soccerway report		Stadium: Stade 20 Août 1955; Referee: Redouane Necib

8 March 2011 Round 14	JSM Béjaïa	1–1	CR Belouizdad	Béjaïa
14:30	Meftah 86' (pen.)	Soccerway report	Mammeri 87'	Stadium: Stade de l'Unité Maghrébine; Referee: Mohamed Benouza

12 March 2011 Round 15	CR Belouizdad	0–0	ES Sétif	Belouizdad
14:30		Soccerway report		Stadium: Stade 20 Août 1955; Referee: Mokhtar Amalou

19 March 2011 Round 16	CR Belouizdad	1–0	MC Saïda	Belouizdad
14:30	Bourakba 62'	Soccerway report		Stadium: Stade 20 Août 1955; Referee: Ali Babou

29 March 2011 Round 17	MC El Eulma	0–0	CR Belouizdad	El Eulma
15:30		Soccerway report		Stadium: Stade Messaoud Zougar; Referee: Farouk Mial

17 May 2011 Round 18	CR Belouizdad	7–1	JS Kabylie	Belouizdad
17:00	Abdat 3'; Slimani 20', 24', 49', 69'; Rebih 40' (pen.); Saïbi 90+2' (pen.)	Soccerway report	Tedjar 34' (pen.)	Stadium: Stade 20 Août 1955; Referee: Mohamed Haddada

13 April 2011 Round 19	MC Alger	1–1	CR Belouizdad	Algiers
17:00	Mokdad 21'	Soccerway report	Saïbi 14'	Stadium: Stade Omar Hammadi; Referee: Mohamed Bichari

25 April 2011 Round 20	CR Belouizdad	1–1	AS Khroub	Belouizdad
17:00	Bourakba 38' (pen.)	Soccerway report	Ziad 19'	Stadium: Stade 20 Août 1955; Referee: Bouaza Chenane

7 May 2011 Round 21	MC Oran	1–2	CR Belouizdad	Oran
17:00	Aouadj 85'	Soccerway report	Slimani 3'; Kherbache 45'	Stadium: Ahmed Zabana Stadium; Referee: Boubekeur Zouaoui

13 May 2011 Round 22	CR Belouizdad	1–0	USM Blida	Belouizdad
17:00	Rebih 66'	Soccerway report		Stadium: Stade 20 Août 1955; Referee: Rafik Achouri

21 May 2011 Round 23	CR Belouizdad	2–0	CA Bordj Bou Arreridj	Belouizdad
17:00	Slimani 36'; Rebih 65'	Soccerway report		Stadium: Stade 20 Août 1955; Referee: Mohamed Sahraoui

27 May 2011 Round 24	ASO Chlef	2–1	CR Belouizdad	Chlef
17:00	Mellouli 81'; Ali Hadji 90+5' (pen.)	Soccerway report	Rebih 87'	Stadium: Stade Mohamed Boumezrag; Referee: Sofiane Bousseter

31 May 2011 Round 25	CR Belouizdad	2–0	USM Annaba	Belouizdad
17:00	Ammour 68'; Slimani 86' (pen.)	Soccerway report		Stadium: Stade 20 Août 1955; Referee: Ali Babou

21 June 2011 Round 26	USM El Harrach	1–0	CR Belouizdad	Algiers
18:00	Boumechra 41' (pen.)	Soccerway report		Stadium: Stade 1er Novembre 1954; Referee: Mohamed Bichari

25 June 2011 Round 27	CR Belouizdad	0–0	USM Alger	Belouizdad
18:00		Soccerway report		Stadium: Stade 20 Août 1955; Referee: Mohamed Benouza

28 June 2011 Round 28	WA Tlemcen	4–0	CR Belouizdad	Tlemcen
18:00	Sameur 40', 84'; Boudjakdji 58', 73'	Soccerway report		Stadium: Stade Akid Lotfi; Referee: Rafik Achouri

1 July 2011 Round 29	CR Belouizdad	0–1	JSM Béjaïa	Belouizdad
18:00		Soccerway report	Zerdab 26'	Stadium: Stade 20 Août 1955; Referee: Mehdi Abid Charef

8 July 2011 Round 30	ES Sétif	2–0	CR Belouizdad	Sétif
18:00	Ghazali 50' (pen.); Hachoud 89'	Soccerway report		Stadium: Stade 8 Mai 1945; Referee: Khaled Saâdi

== Algerian Cup ==
31 December 2010 Round of 64	CRB Sendjas	0–1	CR Belouizdad	Chlef
14:15		Report	Saïbi 44'	Stadium: Stade Mohamed Boumezrag; Referee: Gherbal, Bouhassoune, Belkheir
Note: Lineup for CR Belouizdad - Ghoul, Herida, Maâziz, Mammeri, Boukedjane, Anane (B. Benadjia, 83’), Khellaf, Aouad (Kherbache, 80’), Harrouche, Saïbi, Slimani (Bey, 74’).

4 March 2011 Round of 32	IRB Robah	1–1 (a.e.t.) (7–8 p)	CR Belouizdad	Oued Souf
15:00	Chelalga 15' (pen.)	Report	Rebih 60'	Referee: Necib, Bahloul, Hadjadj
Note: Lineup for CR Belouizdad - Ghoul, Maâziz (Slimani, 46’), Aksas, Slimi, Boukria (Herida, 91’), Kherbache, Anane, Harrouche (Lahmar, 65’), Ammour, Rebih, Saïbi.

15 March 2011 Round of 16	CR Belouizdad	3–0	NTS Tadamoun Souf	Belouizdad
14:30	Saïbi 23', 38'; Ammour 85'	Report		Stadium: Stade 20 Août 1955; Referee: Ghorbal, Bouhassoun, Ferradj
Note: Lineup for CR Belouizdad - Ghoul, Maâziz, Slimi, Benaldjia (Anane, 68’), Abdat, Harrouche (Herida, 60’), Lahmar, Mekehout, Ammour, Kherbache, Saïbi (Bourekba, 60’).

9 April 2011 Quarter-finals	JS Kabylie	4–2	CR Belouizdad	Tizi Ouzou
15:00	Hamiti 15', 43'; Tedjar 50' (pen.); Younès 77'	Report	Saïbi 40'; Slimani 86'	Stadium: Stade 1er Novembre 1954; Referee: Mehdi Abid Charef
Note: Lineup for CR Belouizdad - Ghoul, Mammeri, Aksas, Abdat, Boukedjane, Lahmar (Kherbache, 57’), Mekehout, Harrouche (Benaldjia, 80’), Ammour, Bourakba (Slimani, 57’), Saïbi.

== Squad information ==
=== Playing statistics ===
No.	Pos	Nat	Player	Total		Ligue 1		Algerian Cup	
No.	Pos	Nat	Player	Apps	Goals	Apps	Goals	Apps	Goals
Goalkeepers
1	GK	(Algeria) ALG	Mohamed Ousserir	25	0	25	0	0	0
25	GK	(Algeria) ALG	Nadjib Ghoul	6	0	2	0	4	0
16	GK	(Algeria) ALG	Hamza Dahmane	3	0	3	0	0	0
Defenders
	DF	(Algeria) ALG	Omar Selimi	3	0	1	0	2	0
4	DF	(Algeria) ALG	Abdelkrim Mammeri	28	1	26	1	2	0
24	DF	(Algeria) ALG	Khalil Boukedjane	22	0	20	0	2	0
20	DF	(Algeria) ALG	Amine Aksas	24	0	22	0	2	0
2	DF	(Algeria) ALG	Fayçal Abdat	28	1	26	1	2	0
21	DF	(Algeria) ALG	Mohamed Herida	11	1	8	1	3	0
26	DF	(Algeria) ALG	Nadjib Maaziz	10	0	7	0	3	0
8	DF	(Algeria) ALG	Billel Benaldjia	21	0	18	0	3	0
22	DF	(Algeria) ALG	Lyes Boukria	22	0	21	0	1	0
5	DF	(Algeria) ALG	Soufyane Mebarki	2	0	2	0	0	0
Midfielders
29	MF	(Algeria) ALG	Mohamed Lahmar Abbou	22	0	19	0	3	0
17	MF	(Algeria) ALG	Mohamed El Amine Aouad	16	0	15	0	1	0
28	MF	(Algeria) ALG	Amar Ammour	16	2	13	1	3	1
6	MF	(Algeria) ALG	Ahmed Mekehout	24	0	22	0	2	0
10	MF	(Algeria) ALG	Hocine Harrouche	25	0	21	0	4	0
13	MF	(Algeria) ALG	Merouane Anane	20	0	17	0	3	0
14	MF	(Algeria) ALG	Djafer Khellaf	3	0	2	0	1	0
12	MF	(Algeria) ALG	Mohamed Ismail Kherbache	20	1	16	1	4	0
	MF	(Algeria) ALG	Nassim Baâ	1	0	1	0	0	0
Forwards
7	FW	(Algeria) ALG	Ibrahim Bousehaba	3	0	3	0	0	0
18	FW	(Algeria) ALG	Aboubaker Rebih	30	7	29	6	1	1
23	FW	(Algeria) ALG	Youcef Saïbi	23	6	19	2	4	4
19	FW	(Algeria) ALG	Ramzi Bourakba	19	10	17	10	2	0
	FW	(Algeria) ALG	Fouad Lahouamed	4	0	4	0	0	0
9	FW	(Algeria) ALG	Islam Slimani	29	11	26	10	3	1
	FW	(Algeria) ALG	Imad Bendif	1	0	1	0	0	0
Players transferred out during the season

Last updated: 28 November 2017
Source: fr.soccerway.com

=== Goalscorers ===
Includes all competitive matches. The list is sorted alphabetically by surname when total goals are equal.

No.	Nat.	Player	Pos.	L 1	AC	TOTAL
9	(Algeria)	Islam Slimani	FW	10	1	11
19	(Algeria)	Ramzi Bourakba	FW	10	0	10
18	(Algeria)	Aboubaker Rebih	FW	6	1	7
23	(Algeria)	Youcef Saïbi	FW	2	4	6
28	(Algeria)	Amar Ammour	MF	1	1	2
12	(Algeria)	Mohamed Ismail Kherbache	MF	1	0	1
4	(Algeria)	Abdelkrim Mammeri	DF	1	0	1
2	(Algeria)	Fayçal Abdat	DF	1	0	1
21	(Algeria)	Mohamed Herida	DF	1	0	1
Own Goals				0	0	0
Totals				33	7	40

== Transfers ==
=== In ===
Date	Pos	Player	From club	Transfer fee	Source
2 July 2010	FW	(Algeria) Aboubaker Rebih	USM Annaba	Undisclosed	
28 January 2011	DF	(Algeria) Omar Selimi	ASO Chlef	Undisclosed	
30 January 2011	MF	(Algeria) Amar Ammour	MC Alger	Free transfer	

=== Out ===
Date	Pos	Player	To club	Transfer fee	Source
27 December 2010	FW	(Algeria) Ibrahim Bousehaba	WA Tlemcen	Loan for one & a half year	
