= 2009–10 CR Belouizdad season =

CR Belouizdad
2009–10 season
- Chairman: Mahfoud Kerbadj
- Head coach: Mohamed Henkouche (until 3 October 2009); Karim Bouhila (c) (from 4 October 2009) (until 24 December 2009); Mohamed Henkouche (from 25 December 2009)
- Stadium: Stade 20 Août 1955
- National 1: 9th
- Algerian Cup: Round of 16
- Confederation Cup: Play-off round
- Top goalscorer: League: Islam Slimani (9); All: Islam Slimani (11)

In the 2009–10 season, CR Belouizdad competed in the National 1 for the 44th season, as well as the Algerian Cup and the CAF Confederation Cup.

== Squad list ==
Players and squad numbers last updated on 18 November 2009.
Note: Flags indicate national team as has been defined under FIFA eligibility rules. Players may hold more than one non-FIFA nationality.

No.	Nat.	Position	Name	Date of birth (age)	Signed from
Goalkeepers
1	(Algeria)	GK	Mohamed Ousserir	5 February 1978 (aged 31)	(Algeria) NA Hussein Dey
16	(Algeria)	GK	Hamza Dahmane	22 September 1990 (aged 19)	(Algeria) Youth system
Defenders
4	(Algeria)		Abdelkrim Mammeri	12 January 1981 (aged 28)	(Algeria) WA Boufarik
24	(Algeria)		Khalil Boukedjane	27 January 1981 (aged 28)	(Algeria) RC Kouba
	(Algeria)		Amine Aksas	5 March 1983 (aged 26)	(Algeria) ES Sétif
21	(Algeria)		Mohamed Herida	28 March 1988 (aged 21)	(Algeria) Youth system
3	(Algeria)		Nadjib Maaziz	4 May 1989 (aged 20)	(Algeria) Youth system
	(Algeria)		Lyes Boukria	9 September 1981 (aged 28)	(Algeria) JS Kabylie
5	(Algeria)		Soufyane Mebarki	13 May 1986 (aged 23)	(Algeria) IRB Maghnia
Midfielders
19	(Algeria)		Mohamed Lahmar Abbou	18 August 1986 (aged 23)	(Algeria) RC Relizane
17	(Algeria)		Mohamed El Amine Aouad	20 September 1984 (aged 25)	(Algeria) ASM Oran
6	(Algeria)		Ahmed Mekehout	4 April 1983 (aged 26)	(Algeria) USM Annaba
	(Algeria)		Merouane Anane	31 May 1990 (aged 19)	(Algeria) Youth system
	(Algeria)		Mohamed Ismail Kherbache	1 July 1990 (aged 19)	(Algeria) Youth system
12	(Ivory Coast)		Alex Somian	6 June 1986 (aged 23)	(Algeria) ES Setif
14	(Algeria)		Abdelkader Harizi	14 July 1987 (aged 22)	(Algeria) Youth system
Forwards
	(Algeria)		Ibrahim Bousehaba	2 December 1985 (aged 24)	(Algeria) US Remchi
23	(Algeria)		Youcef Saïbi	22 August 1982 (aged 27)	(Algeria) USM El Harrach
	(Algeria)		Fouad Lahouamed	1 July 1990 (aged 19)	(Algeria) ?
9	(Algeria)		Islam Slimani	18 June 1988 (aged 21)	(Algeria) JSM Chéraga
18	(Algeria)		Hocine Fenier	5 March 1983 (aged 26)	(Algeria) USM Annaba
10	(Algeria)		Sofiane Younes	25 November 1982 (aged 27)	(Algeria) MC Alger

== Competitions ==
=== Overview ===
Competition	Record								Started round	Final position / round	First match	Last match
Competition	G	W	D	L	GF	GA	GD	Win %	Started round	Final position / round	First match	Last match
National 1	34	12	10	12	37	38	−1	35.29	—N/a	9th	6 August 2009	31 May 2010
Algerian Cup	3	2	0	1	4	3	+1	66.67	Round of 64	Round of 16	26 December 2009	16 March 2010
CAF Confederation Cup	8	3	4	1	8	5	+3	37.50	Preliminary round	Play-off round	12 February 2010	31 July 2010
Total	45	17	14	14	49	46	+3	37.78				

Updated to match played 3 June 2019
Source: Competitions

=== National ===
==== League table ====
Pos	Team	Pld	W	D	L	GF	GA	GD	Pts
7	USM Annaba	34	12	13	9	40	35	+5	49
8	WA Tlemcen	34	12	10	12	43	43	0	46
9	CR Belouizdad	34	12	10	12	37	38	−1	46
10	CA Bordj Bou Arreridj	34	13	10	11	41	45	−4	46 (Note: CA Bordj Bou Arreridj were docked three points.)
11	AS Khroub	34	12	9	13	37	45	−8	45

Source: Soccerways FIFA.com
Rules for classification: 1) points; 2) goal difference; 3) number of goals scored.

==== Results summary ====
Overall								Home						Away					
Pld	W	D	L	GF	GA	GD	Pts	W	D	L	GF	GA	GD	W	D	L	GF	GA	GD
34	12	10	12	37	38	−1	46	10	4	3	23	8	+15	2	6	9	14	30	−16

Last updated: 22 April 2018.
Source: Competitive matches

==== Results by round ====
Round	1	2	3	4	5	6	7	8	9	10	11	12	13	14	15	16	17	18	19	20	21	22	23	24	25	26	27	28	29	30	31	32	33	34
Ground																																		
Result																																		
Position																																		

Source: Competitive matches
A = Away; H = Home; W = Win; D = Draw; L = Loss

=== Matches ===
Win Draw Loss

6 August 2009 Round 1	MC Oran	4–1	CR Belouizdad	Oran
19:00	El Bahari 63'; Kechamli 65'; Daoud 72', 90'	Soccerway report	Saïbi 61'	Stadium: Stade Ahmed Zabana; Referee: Mohamed Bouhenni

15 August 2009 Round 2	CR Belouizdad	1–0	JSM Béjaïa	Belouizdad
17:30	Bey 32' (pen.)	Soccerway report		Stadium: Stade 20 Août 1955; Referee: Mohamed Benouza

22 August 2009 Round 3	ES Sétif	1–1	CR Belouizdad	Sétif
22:00	Kaddour 62'	Soccerway report	Saïbi 17'	Stadium: Stade 8 Mai 1945; Referee: Redouane Necib

28 August 2009 Round 4	CR Belouizdad	1–0	AS Khroub	Belouizdad
23:00	Bey 60'	Soccerway report		Stadium: Stade 20 Août 1955; Referee: Farouk Mial

12 September 2009 Round 5	MC El Eulma	2–1	CR Belouizdad	El Eulma
17:00	Belhamel 30'; Bakrar 45'	Soccerway report	Slimani 67'	Stadium: Stade Messaoud Zougar; Referee: Mohamed Belbaka

18 September 2009 Round 6	MSP Batna	1–1	CR Belouizdad	Batna
23:00	Amaouche 45'	Soccerway report	Slimani 6'	Stadium: Stade 1er Novembre 1954; Referee: Belkacem Boumaza

26 September 2009 Round 7	CR Belouizdad	2–2	USM Alger	Algiers
16:00	Saïbi 2', 90+2'	Soccerway report	Dziri 22', 88'	Stadium: Stade 5 Juillet 1962; Referee: Mokhtar Amalou

2 October 2009 Round 8	USM Annaba	3–0	CR Belouizdad	Annaba
20:00	Rebih 8'; Boudar 28'; Bensaid 68'	Soccerway report		Stadium: Stade 19 Mai 1956; Referee: Boubekeur Zouaoui

16 October 2009 Round 9	CR Belouizdad	1–0	USM Blida	Belouizdad
20:00	Younès 39' (pen.)	Soccerway report		Stadium: Stade 20 Août 1955; Referee: Mohamed Bouali

23 October 2009 Round 10	ASO Chlef	5–0	CR Belouizdad	Chlef
20:00	Messaoud 33', 41', 48', 87'; Mekioui 79'	Soccerway report		Stadium: Stade Mohamed Boumezrag; Referee: Redouane Necib

30 October 2009 Round 11	CR Belouizdad	1–0	JS Kabylie	Belouizdad
18:00	Saïbi 11'	Soccerway report		Stadium: Stade 20 Août 1955; Referee: Mohamed Bichari

6 November 2009 Round 12	CA Bordj Bou Arreridj	1–0	CR Belouizdad	Bordj Bou Arréridj
18:00	Ouichaoui 85'	Soccerway report		Stadium: August 20, 1955 Stadium; Attendance: 0 (close doors); Referee: Rafik Achouri

22 December 2009 Round 13	CR Belouizdad	1–1	USM El Harrach	Belouizdad
14:00	Mammeri 70'	Soccerway report	Hanitser 19'	Stadium: Stade 20 Août 1955; Attendance: 0 (close doors); Referee: Rafik Achouri

13 November 2009 Round 14	NA Hussein Dey	1–2	CR Belouizdad	Algiers
18:00	Mekkaoui 13'	Soccerway report	Saïbi 8'; Slimani 90'	Stadium: Stade Frères Zioui; Referee: Djamel Haimoudi

4 December 2009 Round 15	CR Belouizdad	0–1	CA Batna	Belouizdad
18:00		Soccerway report	Kab 38'	Stadium: Stade 20 Août 1955; Referee: Mohamed Hediaf

11 December 2009 Round 16	MC Alger	4–2	CR Belouizdad	Algiers
18:00	Babouche 21', 51' (pen.); Attafen 66'; Bouguèche 88'	Soccerway report	Saïbi 3'; Berradja 71'	Stadium: Stade 5 Juillet 1962; Referee: Mohamed Haddada

15 December 2009 Round 17	CR Belouizdad	1–0	WA Tlemcen	Belouizdad
14:00	Fenier 45'	Soccerway report		Stadium: Stade 20 Août 1955; Attendance: 0 (close doors); Referee: Mustapha Ferradi

16 January 2010 Round 18	CR Belouizdad	2–0	MC Oran	Belouizdad
14:30	Slimani 28'; Aouad 54'	Soccerway report		Stadium: Stade 20 Août 1955; Referee: Boubekeur Zouaoui

23 January 2010 Round 19	JSM Béjaïa	1–1	CR Belouizdad	Béjaïa
14:30	Zerdab 74'	Soccerway report	Younes 69'	Stadium: Stade de l'Unité Maghrébine; Referee: Okba Benbaka

29 March 2010 Round 20	CR Belouizdad	0–1	ES Sétif	Belouizdad
18:00		Soccerway report	Metref 51' (pen.)	Stadium: Stade 20 Août 1955; Referee: Djamel Haimoudi

6 February 2010 Round 21	AS Khroub	1–1	CR Belouizdad	El Khroub
14:30	Zerrouki 25' (pen.)	Soccerway report	Alex Somian 40'	Stadium: Abed Hamdani Stadium; Referee: Rafik Achouri

16 February 2010 Round 22	CR Belouizdad	3–0	MC El Eulma	Belouizdad
14:00	Saïbi 7'; Bousehaba 36'; Slimani 86'	Soccerway report		Stadium: Stade 20 Août 1955; Referee: Djamel Haimoudi

23 February 2010 Round 23	CR Belouizdad	4–0	MSP Batna	Belouizdad
14:00	Slimani 27'; Bousehaba 29'; Gharbi 64'; Younes 79'	Soccerway report		Stadium: Stade 20 Août 1955; Referee: Farouk Mial

5 March 2010 Round 24	USM Alger	1–0	CR Belouizdad	Rouïba
14:30	Daham 65'	Soccerway report		Stadium: Stade Mabrouki Salem; Referee: Mohamed Bouali

26 March 2010 Round 25	CR Belouizdad	0–0	USM Annaba	Belouizdad
14:30		Soccerway report		Stadium: Stade 20 Août 1955; Referee: Mohamed Bouhenni

23 March 2010 Round 26	USM Blida	0–0	CR Belouizdad	Blida
14:30		Soccerway report		Stadium: Stade Mustapha Tchaker; Referee: Boubekeur Zouaoui

6 April 2010 Round 27	CR Belouizdad	2–0	ASO Chlef	Belouizdad
15:00	Benettayeb 41' (o.g.); Bousehaba 61'	Soccerway report		Stadium: Stade 20 Août 1955; Referee: Said Douala

30 April 2010 Round 28	JS Kabylie	2–1	CR Belouizdad	Tizi Ouzou
17:00	Coulibaly 20'; Yahia-Chérif 47'	Soccerway report	Younes 44' (pen.)	Stadium: Stade 1er Novembre 1954; Referee: Boubekeur Zouaoui

4 May 2010 Round 29	CR Belouizdad	1–2	CA Bordj Bou Arreridj	Belouizdad
17:00	Younes 75'	Soccerway report	Hachoud 40'; Linares 90+1'	Stadium: Stade 20 Août 1955; Referee: Sofiane Bousseter

14 May 2010 Round 30	USM El Harrach	0–0	CR Belouizdad	El Harrach
17:00		Soccerway report		Stadium: November 1, 1954 Stadium; Referee: Mehdi Abid Charef

22 May 2010 Round 31	CR Belouizdad	3–1	NA Hussein Dey	Belouizdad
17:00	Slimani 19'; Bousehaba 28' (pen.); Younes 59'	Soccerway report	Harrouche 62' (pen.)	Stadium: Stade 20 Août 1955; Referee: Lahlou Benbraham

25 May 2010 Round 32	CA Batna	1–0	CR Belouizdad	Batna
17:00	Kebia 21'	Soccerway report		Stadium: Stade 1er Novembre 1954; Referee: Farouk Mial

28 May 2010 Round 33	CR Belouizdad	0–0	MC Alger	Algiers
17:00		Soccerway report		Stadium: Stade 5 Juillet 1962; Referee: Mohamed Bichari

31 May 2010 Round 34	WA Tlemcen	2–3	CR Belouizdad	Tlemcen
17:00	Djallit 21', 82'	Soccerway report	Berradja 32'; Slimani 70', 90+2'	Stadium: Stade Akid Lotfi; Referee: Bouaza Chenane

== Algerian Cup ==
26 December 2009 Round of 64	SC Aïn Defla	1–2	CR Belouizdad	Chlef
14:30	Abdelali Soumeur 70'		Slimani 64'; Bousehaba 83'	Stadium: Mohamed Boumezrag Stadium

20 February 2010 Round of 32	JS Djijel	1–2 (a.e.t.)	CR Belouizdad	Jijel
14:30	Bourada 65'		Younès 12', 107'	Stadium: Rouibah Hocine Stadium; Referee: A. Aouina, F. Aouina, Chnaoua

15 March 2010 Round of 16	CR Belouizdad	0–1	JS Kabylie	Algiers
14:00			Aoudia 30'	Stadium: Stade 20 Août 1955; Referee: Amalou, Benarous and Azrine

== Confederation Cup ==
=== Preliminary round ===
12 February 2010 first leg	Tersanah (Libya)	1–1	(Algeria) CR Belouizdad	Tripoli
			Saïbi 41'	Stadium: 11 June Stadium; Referee: Makrem Legguem (Tunisia)

27 February 2010 Second leg	CR Belouizdad (Algeria)	2–1	(Libya) Tersanah	Belouizdad
	Younes 35'; Bousehaba 49'			Stadium: Stade 20 Août 1955; Referee: Ali Ould Lemghaifry (Mauritania)

=== First round ===
10 March 2010 first leg	CR Belouizdad (Algeria)	1–0	(Morocco) FAR Rabat	Belouizdad
	Saïbi 37'			Stadium: Stade 20 Août 1955; Referee: Badara Diatta (Senegal)

3 April 2010 Second leg	FAR Rabat (Morocco)	1–1	(Algeria) CR Belouizdad	Rabat
	Ouaddouch 45'		Aouad 43'	Stadium: Prince Moulay Abdellah Stadium; Referee: Mohamed Meddeb (Tunisia)

=== Second round ===
23 April 2010 first leg	Al-Amal SC (Sudan)	1–0	(Algeria) CR Belouizdad	Atbarah
	El Tahir Hamad 51'			Stadium: Stade Al-Amal Atbara; Referee: Fredrick Kayindi-Ngobi (Uganda)

7 May 2010 Second leg	CR Belouizdad (Algeria)	2–0	(Sudan) Al-Amal SC	Belouizdad
	Mebarki 12'; Berradja 75'			Stadium: Stade 20 Août 1955; Referee: Abdellah El Achiri (Morocco)

=== Play-off round ===
17 July 2010 first leg	Djoliba (Mali)	0–0	(Algeria) CR Belouizdad	Bamako
				Stadium: Stade Modibo Kéïta; Referee: Ali Ould Lemghaifry (Mauritania)

31 July 2010 Second leg	CR Belouizdad (Algeria)	1–1	(Mali) Djoliba	Belouizdad
	Slimani 2'		Coulibaly 33'	Stadium: Stade 20 Août 1955; Referee: Bakary Gassama (Gambia)

== Squad information ==
=== Playing statistics ===
No.	Pos	Nat	Player	Total		National 1		Algerian Cup		Confederation Cup	
No.	Pos	Nat	Player	Apps	Goals	Apps	Goals	Apps	Goals	Apps	Goals
Goalkeepers
1	GK	(Algeria) ALG	Mohamed Ousserir	29	0	21	0	2	0	6	0
16	GK	(Algeria) ALG	Ahmed Fellah	15	0	12	0	1	0	2	0
	GK	(Algeria) ALG	Hamza Dahmane	1	0	1	0	0	0	0	0
Defenders
	DF	(Algeria) ALG	Amine Aksas	17	0	10	0	1	0	6	0
3	DF	(Algeria) ALG	Nadjib Maaziz	20	0	15	0	1	0	4	0
21	DF	(Algeria) ALG	Mohamed Herida	18	0	14	0	0	0	4	0
5	DF	(Algeria) ALG	Soufyane Mebarki	22	1	18	0	0	0	4	1
2	DF	(Algeria) ALG	Redouane Akniouene	16	0	11	0	2	0	3	0
4	DF	(Algeria) ALG	Abdelkrim Mammeri	39	1	28	1	3	0	8	0
	DF	(Algeria) ALG	Lyès Boukria	16	0	9	0	1	0	6	0
24	DF	(Algeria) ALG	Khalil Boukedjane	29	0	23	0	2	0	4	0
Midfielders
8	MF	(Algeria) ALG	Lounés Bendahmane	22	0	19	0	2	0	1	0
12	MF	(Ivory Coast) CIV	Alex Somian	34	1	27	1	2	0	5	0
19	MF	(Algeria) ALG	Mohamed Lahmar Abbou	28	0	21	0	3	0	4	0
6	MF	(Algeria) ALG	Ahmed Mekehout	26	0	20	0	1	0	5	0
	MF	(Algeria) ALG	Merouane Anane	2	0	2	0	0	0	0	0
20	MF	(Algeria) ALG	Seddik Berradja	31	3	24	2	3	0	4	1
22	MF	(Algeria) ALG	Mohamed Nabil Bellat	6	0	6	0	0	0	0	0
17	MF	(Algeria) ALG	Mohamed El Amine Aouad	39	2	29	1	3	0	7	1
	MF	(Algeria) ALG	Mohamed Ismail Kherbache	4	0	3	0	1	0	0	0
Forwards
18	FW	(Algeria) ALG	Hocine Fenier	12	1	12	1	0	0	0	0
10	FW	(Algeria) ALG	Sofiane Younes	37	9	27	6	3	2	7	1
11	FW	(Algeria) ALG	Mahmoud Bey	25	2	20	2	1	0	4	0
23	FW	(Algeria) ALG	Youcef Saïbi	32	9	25	7	1	0	6	2
	FW	(Algeria) ALG	Ibrahim Bousehaba	29	7	20	5	3	1	6	1
13	FW	(Algeria) ALG	Sabri Gharbi	16	1	11	1	1	0	4	0
	FW	(Algeria) ALG	Fouad Lahouamed	1	0	1	0	0	0	0	0
9	FW	(Algeria) ALG	Islam Slimani	40	11	29	9	3	1	8	1
Players transferred out during the season
14	MF	(Algeria) ALG	Abdelkader Harizi	7	0	7	0	0	0	0	0

Last updated: 28 November 2017

=== Goalscorers ===
Includes all competitive matches. The list is sorted alphabetically by surname when total goals are equal.

No.	Nat.	Player	Pos.	N 1	AC	CC 3	TOTAL
9	(Algeria)	Islam Slimani	FW	9	1	1	11
23	(Algeria)	Youcef Saïbi	FW	7	0	2	9
10	(Algeria)	Sofiane Younes	FW	6	2	1	9
	(Algeria)	Ibrahim Bousehaba	FW	5	1	1	7
20	(Algeria)	Seddik Berradja	MF	2	0	1	3
17	(Algeria)	Mohamed El Amine Aouad	MF	1	0	1	2
11	(Algeria)	Mahmoud Bey	FW	2	0	0	2
12	(Ivory Coast)	Alex Somian	MF	1	0	0	1
5	(Algeria)	Soufyane Mebarki	DF	0	0	1	1
4	(Algeria)	Abdelkrim Mammeri	DF	1	0	0	1
18	(Algeria)	Hocine Fenier	FW	1	0	0	1
13	(Algeria)	Sabri Gharbi	FW	1	0	0	1
Own Goals				1	0	0	1
Totals				37	4	8	49

== Transfers ==
=== In ===
Date	Pos	Player	From club	Transfer fee	Source
18 May 2009	FW	(Algeria) Islam Slimani	JSM Chéraga	Free transfer	
15 June 2009	FW	(Algeria) Youcef Saïbi	USM El Harrach	Free transfer	
30 June 2009	MF	(Algeria) Mohamed El Amine Aouad	ASM Oran	Free transfer	
1 July 2009	DF	(Algeria) Amine Aksas	ES Sétif	Free transfer	
1 January 2010	DF	(Algeria) Lyès Boukria	JS Kabylie	Free transfer	

=== Out ===
Date	Pos	Player	To club	Transfer fee	Source
26 June 2009	MF	(Algeria) Hamza Aït Ouamar	USM Alger	Free transfer	
25 July 2009	FW	(Burkina Faso) Alain Nebie	USM Alger	Free transfer	
1 January 2010	MF	(Algeria) Abdelkader Harizi	USM Blida	Free transfer	
