= 2012–13 CR Belouizdad season =

CR Belouizdad
2012–13 season
- Chairman: Réda Malek
- Head coach: Guglielmo Arena (until 23 October 2012); Fouad Bouali (from 7 November 2012)
- Stadium: Stade 20 Août 1955
- Ligue 1: 6th
- Algerian Cup: Quarter-final
- UAFA Club Cup: Quarter-final
- Top goalscorer: League: Mehdi Benaldjia (5); Aboubaker Rebih (5); All: Islam Slimani (10)

In the 2012–13 season, CR Belouizdad competed in the Ligue 1 for the 47th season, as well as the Algerian Cup.

== Squad list ==
Players and squad numbers last updated on 18 November 2010.
Note: Flags indicate national team as has been defined under FIFA eligibility rules. Players may hold more than one non-FIFA nationality.

No.	Nat.	Position	Name	Date of birth (age)	Signed from
Goalkeepers
Defenders
Midfielders
Forwards

== Competitions ==
=== Overview ===
Competition	Record								Started round	Final position / round	First match	Last match
Competition	G	W	D	L	GF	GA	GD	Win %	Started round	Final position / round	First match	Last match
Ligue 1	30	11	11	8	32	26	+6	36.67	—N/a	6th	15 September 2012	21 May 2013
Algerian Cup	4	3	0	1	8	2	+6	75.00	Round of 64	Quarter-final	15 December 2012	30 March 2013
UAFA Club Cup	4	1	2	1	7	5	+2	25.00	Second Round	Quarter-final	20 October 2012	27 February 2013
Total	38	15	13	10	47	33	+14	39.47				

Updated to match played 9 May 2017
Source: Competitions

=== Ligue 1 ===
==== League table ====
Pos	Team	Pld	W	D	L	GF	GA	GD	Pts	Qualification or relegation
4	USM Alger (Note: USM Alger, the 2012–13 Algerian Cup winner, withdrew before the start of the competition.)	30	15	6	9	32	15	+17	51	Qualification for the Confederation Cup preliminary round
5	MC Alger (Note: In a match between USM El Harrach and MC Alger the last refused to play in the Stade 1er Novembre 1954, but the LFP refused to change the pitch, Despite the presence of USM El Harrach, the referees and supporters, but the Mouloudia team did not attend. the club will receive a penalty, according to Article 84 of the Disciplinary Code of the Algerian Football Federation (FAF), "a match lost by penalty. Defalcation of three (03) points, One million dinars (1,000,000 dinars) fine for the club. "The offending club will be deprived of its compensation due for television rights.)	30	15	8	7	33	24	+9	50	
6	CR Belouizdad	30	11	11	8	32	26	+6	44	
7	JS Kabylie	30	11	8	11	32	31	+1	41	
8	MC El Eulma	30	9	13	8	29	27	+2	40	

Updated to match(es) played on 21 May 2013. Source: DZFoot
Rules for classification: 1) points; 2) head-to-head points; 3) head-to-head goal difference; 4) goal difference; 5) total goals; 6) fairplay ranking; 7) playoff.

==== Results summary ====
Overall								Home						Away					
Pld	W	D	L	GF	GA	GD	Pts	W	D	L	GF	GA	GD	W	D	L	GF	GA	GD
30	11	11	8	32	26	+6	44	8	6	1	22	11	+11	3	5	7	10	15	−5

Last updated: 29 December 2014.
Source: Competitive matches

==== Results by round ====
Round	1	2	3	4	5	6	7	8	9	10	11	12	13	14	15	16	17	18	19	20	21	22	23	24	25	26	27	28	29	30
Ground	A	H	A	H	A	A	H	A	H	A	H	A	H	A	H	H	A	H	A	H	H	A	H	A	H	A	H	A	H	A
Result	W	W	L	D	D	L	D	W	D	L	W	D	L	D	D	W	W	W	D	W	D	L	D	D	W	L	W	L	W	L
Position																														

Source: Competitive matches
A = Away; H = Home; W = Win; D = Draw; L = Loss

=== Matches ===
15 September 2012 Round 1	JS Saoura	0–1	CR Belouizdad	Béchar
16:00		Report	87' Slimani	Stadium: Stade 20 Août 1955; Referee: Mohamed Bachir

18 September 2012 Round 2	CR Belouizdad	1–0	ASO Chlef	Belouizdad
18:00	Aksas 72'	Report		Stadium: Stade 20 Août 1955; Referee: Farouk Mial

22 September 2012 Round 3	JSM Béjaïa	1–0	CR Belouizdad	Béjaïa
18:00	Bourakba 32'	Report		Stadium: Stade de l'Unité Maghrébine; Referee: Mohamed Benouza

28 September 2012 Round 4	CR Belouizdad	0–0	USM Bel-Abbès	Belouizdad
16:45		Report		Stadium: Stade 20 Août 1955; Referee: Redouane Necib

6 October 2012 Round 5	MC Oran	1–1	CR Belouizdad	Oran
18:00	Dagoulou 49'	Report	42' Slimani	Stadium: Ahmed Zabana Stadium; Referee: Rafik Achouri

16 October 2012 Round 6	CS Constantine	1–0	CR Belouizdad	Constantine
16:30	Bezzaz 90+4'	Report		Stadium: Stade Mohamed Hamlaoui; Referee: Boubekeur Zouaoui

20 October 2012 Round 7	CR Belouizdad	0–0	MC Alger	Algiers
17:45		Report		Stadium: July 5, 1962 Stadium; Referee: Mohamed Ghorbal

23 October 2012 Round 8	JS Kabylie	0–1	CR Belouizdad	Tizi Ouzou
18:00		Report	90+4' Sodje	Stadium: Stade du 1er Novembre 1954; Referee: Mehdi Abid Charef

3 November 2012 Round 9	CR Belouizdad	1–1	MC El Eulma	Belouizdad
18:00	Hamiti 42'	Report	71' Akkouche	Stadium: Stade 20 Août 1955; Referee: Mohamed Saïdi

10 November 2012 Round 10	ES Sétif	1–0	CR Belouizdad	Sétif
17:45	Djahnit 53'	Report		Stadium: Stade 8 Mai 1945; Referee: Djamel Haimoudi

17 November 2012 Round 11	CR Belouizdad	2–1	CA Bordj Bou Arréridj	Belouizdad
15:00	Rebih 12', 15'	Report	60' Essifi	Stadium: Stade 20 Août 1955; Referee: Mohamed Bachir

23 November 2012 Round 12	CA Batna	2–2	CR Belouizdad	Batna
15:00	Beloufa 21'; Hadjidj 90+2' (pen.)	Report	83' Benaldjia; 90+4' Amroune	Stadium: November 1, 1954 Stadium; Referee: Mohamed Ghorbal

1 December 2012 Round 13	CR Belouizdad	2–4	USM El Harrach	Blida
15:00	Ammour 90' (pen.), 90+1'	Report	17' Kerim; 18', 88' Bounedjah; 70' El Amali	Stadium: Mustapha Tchaker Stadium; Referee: Farouk Houasnia

11 December 2012 Round 14	WA Tlemcen	1–1	CR Belouizdad	Tlemcen
15:00	Belgherri 49' (pen.)	Report	68' Khoudi	Stadium: Stade Akid Lotfi; Referee: Farouk Mial

22 December 2012 Round 15	CR Belouizdad	0–0	USM Alger	Belouizdad
15:00		Report		Stadium: Stade 20 Août 1955; Referee: Mokhtar Amalou

15 January 2013 Round 16	CR Belouizdad	2–1	JS Saoura	Belouizdad
15:00	Benaldjia 12'; Amroune 56'	Report	19' Tebbal	Stadium: Stade 20 Août 1955; Referee: Mohamed Ghorbal

19 January 2013 Round 17	ASO Chlef	1–2	CR Belouizdad	Chlef
15:00	Nasseri 37'	Report	3' Amroune; 20' Ammour	Stadium: Stade Mohamed Boumezrag; Referee: Mohamed Bachir

26 January 2013 Round 18	CR Belouizdad	4–1	JSM Béjaïa	Belouizdad
15:00	Benaldjia 10' (pen.), 58'; Anane 71'; Dahar 87'	Report	56' (pen.) Zerara	Stadium: Stade 20 Août 1955; Referee: Mohamed Bichari

2 February 2013 Round 19	USM Bel-Abbès	0–0	CR Belouizdad	Sidi Bel Abbès
15:00		Report		Stadium: Stade 24 Fevrier 1956; Referee: Mehdi Abid Charef

8 February 2013 Round 20	CR Belouizdad	1–0	MC Oran	Belouizdad
15:00	Slimani 35'	Report		Stadium: Stade 20 Août 1955; Referee: Farouk Mial

16 February 2013 Round 21	CR Belouizdad	1–1	CS Constantine	Belouizdad
15:00	Khoudi 73'	Report	8' (o.g.) Harkat	Stadium: Stade 20 Août 1955; Referee: Mohamed Saïdi

22 February 2013 Round 22	MC Alger	2–1	CR Belouizdad	Algiers
17:45	Yachir 45+1', 55'	Report	86' Rebih	Stadium: July 5, 1962 Stadium; Referee: Djamel Haimoudi

9 March 2013 Round 23	CR Belouizdad	1–1	JS Kabylie	Belouizdad
15:00	Benaldjia 29'	Report	38' Mokdad	Stadium: Stade 20 Août 1955; Referee: Farouk Houasnia

19 March 2013 Round 24	MC El Eulma	1–1	CR Belouizdad	El Eulma
18:00	Coulibaly 26'	Report	45+1' Slimani	Stadium: Stade Messaoud Zougar; Referee: Mohamed Bachir

16 April 2013 Round 25	CR Belouizdad	4–1	ES Sétif	Belouizdad
18:00	Benchadi 18' (o.g.); Rebih 43', 55'; Dahar 90+4'	Report	28' (pen.) El Okbi	Stadium: Stade 20 Août 1955; Referee: Mohamed Ghorbal

20 April 2013 Round 26	CA Bordj Bou Arréridj	1–0	CR Belouizdad	Bordj Bou Arréridj
16:00	Chebira 33'	Report		Stadium: Stade 20 Août 1955; Referee: Djamel Haimoudi

4 May 2013 Round 27	CR Belouizdad	2–0	CA Batna	Belouizdad
17:00	Kherbache 26'; Benayada 90+4' (o.g.)	Report		Stadium: Stade 20 Août 1955; Referee: Farouk Mial

11 May 2013 Round 28	USM El Harrach	2–0	CR Belouizdad	Algiers
17:00	Amada 25'; Bounedjah 68'	Report		Stadium: Stade 1er Novembre 1954; Referee: Youssef Zerrouki

18 May 2013 Round 29	CR Belouizdad	1–0	WA Tlemcen	Belouizdad
17:00	Tafat 24'	Report		Stadium: Stade 20 Août 1955; Referee: Rafik Achouri

21 May 2013 Round 30	USM Alger	1–0	CR Belouizdad	Algiers
17:00	Daham 40'	Report		Stadium: Stade Omar Hamadi; Referee: Abderrezzak Arab

== Algerian Cup ==
15 December 2012 Round of 64	CR Belouizdad	5–0	MC Debdaba	Belouizdad
14:00	Benaldjia 2'; Ammour 24'; Guilti 69' (o.g.); Slimani 79', 85'			Stadium: Stade 20 Août 1955; Referee: Mohamed Sahraoui

29 December 2012 Round of 32	CR Belouizdad	1–0	JSM Béjaïa	Belouizdad
14:00	Angan 50'			Stadium: Stade 20 Août 1955; Referee: Boubekeur Zouaoui

5 March 2013 Round of 16	CRB Aïn Fakroun	0–1	CR Belouizdad	Aïn M'lila
14:00			Slimani 50'	Stadium: Stade des Frères Demane Debbih; Referee: Mohamed Ghorbal

30 March 2013 Quarter-final	ES Sétif	2–1	CR Belouizdad	Sétif
17:45	Aoudia 40'; Madouni 80'		Slimani 63'	Stadium: Stade 8 Mai 1945; Referee: Redouane Necib

== UAFA Club Cup ==
=== Second round ===
20 October 2012	Steal Nouvel FC (Comoros)	3–0; Awarded (Note: CR Belouizdad did not play the first leg and the result was awarded 3–0 to Steal Nouvel FC.)	(Algeria) CR Belouizdad	Moroni
15:00				Stadium: Stade Said Mohamed Cheikh; Referee: Adam Ahmed Hashem (Sudan)

7 December 2012	CR Belouizdad (Algeria)	5–1	(Comoros) Steal Nouvel FC	Algiers
18:00	Angan 7'; Benaldjia 40'; Ammour 50'; Harkat 76'; Sodje 85'		Souleiman 75'	Stadium: Stade 20 Août 1955; Referee: Mohamed Ben Hassana (Tunisia)

=== Quarter-finals ===
12 February 2013	CR Belouizdad (Algeria)	1–1	(Egypt) Ismaily SC	Algiers
15:00	Slimani 56'		53' Gamal	Stadium: Stade 20 Août 1955; Attendance: 15,000; Referee: Khalid Ennouni (Morocco)

27 February 2013	Ismaily SC (Egypt)	1–1 (a.e.t.) (4–1 p)	(Algeria) CR Belouizdad	Cairo
16:00	Al-Sulaya 18'		Slimani 43'	Stadium: 30 June Stadium; Referee: Abdullah Al-Hilali (Oman)
	Penalties
	Khairy (penalty scored); Al-Sulaya (penalty scored); Abdelfadil (penalty scored); Antwi (penalty scored)		(penalty scored) Slimani; (penalty missed) Ammour; (penalty missed) Rebih

== Squad information ==
=== Playing statistics ===
No.	Pos	Nat	Player	Total		Ligue 1		Algerian Cup		UAFA Club Cup	
No.	Pos	Nat	Player	Apps	Goals	Apps	Goals	Apps	Goals	Apps	Goals
Goalkeepers
1	GK	(Algeria) ALG	Mohamed Ousserir	17	0	15	0	2	0	0	0
22	GK	(Algeria) ALG	Ahmed Walid Chouih	18	0	16	0	2	0	0	0
Defenders
24	DF	(Algeria) ALG	Khalil Boukedjane	16	0	14	0	2	0	0	0
2	DF	(Algeria) ALG	Fayçal Abdat	23	0	21	0	2	0	0	0
8	DF	(Algeria) ALG	Billel Benaldjia	22	2	18	0	4	2	0	0
5	DF	(Algeria) ALG	Sofiane Harkat	22	0	20	0	2	0	0	0
30	DF	(Algeria) ALG	Lyes Boukria	28	0	25	0	3	0	0	0
56	DF	(Algeria) ALG	Adel Messaoudi	20	0	16	0	4	0	0	0
83	DF	(Algeria) ALG	Anis Kerrar	7	0	7	0	0	0	0	0
23	DF	(Algeria) ALG	Hakim Khoudi	24	2	20	2	4	0	0	0
	DF	(Algeria) ALG	Yacine Roudine	1	0	1	0	0	0	0	0
Midfielders
82	MF	(Algeria) ALG	Fodil Hadjadj	5	0	5	0	0	0	0	0
10	MF	(Algeria) ALG	Amar Ammour	30	4	26	3	4	1	0	0
6	MF	(Algeria) ALG	Ahmed Mekehout	8	0	8	0	0	0	0	0
14	MF	(Algeria) ALG	Billal Naïli	8	0	7	0	1	0	0	0
27	MF	(Benin) BEN	Pascal Angan	20	1	18	0	2	1	0	0
11	MF	(Algeria) ALG	Mehdi Benaldjia	23	5	21	5	2	0	0	0
13	MF	(Algeria) ALG	Merouane Anane	25	1	22	1	3	0	0	0
12	MF	(Algeria) ALG	Mohamed Ismail Kherbache	11	1	11	1	0	0	0	0
	MF	(Algeria) ALG	Ahmed Tafat	10	1	9	1	1	0	0	0
	MF	(Algeria) ALG	Bilal Tarikat	3	0	3	0	0	0	0	0
Forwards
29	FW	(Nigeria) NGR	Onome Sodje	15	1	13	1	2	0	0	0
18	FW	(Algeria) ALG	Aboubaker Rebih	32	5	28	5	4	0	0	0
9	FW	(Algeria) ALG	Islam Slimani	18	8	15	4	3	4	0	0
21	FW	(Algeria) ALG	Mohamed Amroune	15	3	12	3	3	0	0	0
34	FW	(Algeria) ALG	Merouane Dahar	12	2	11	2	1	0	0	0
Players transferred out during the season
19	MF	(Algeria) ALG	Saad Sahraoui	3	0	3	0	0	0	0	0
4	DF	(Algeria) ALG	Abdelkrim Mammeri	8	0	8	0	0	0	0	0
	DF	(Tunisia) TUN	Mehdi Hamzaoui	1	0	0	0	1	0	0	0
20	DF	(Algeria) ALG	Amine Aksas	9	1	9	1	0	0	0	0
7	FW	(Algeria) ALG	Farès Hamiti	7	1	7	1	0	0	0	0

Last updated: 28 November 2017
Source: fr.soccerway.com

=== Goalscorers ===
Includes all competitive matches. The list is sorted alphabetically by surname when total goals are equal.

No.	Nat.	Player	Pos.	L 1	AC	UCC	TOTAL
9	(Algeria)	Islam Slimani	FW	4	4	2	10
11	(Algeria)	Mehdi Benaldjia	MF	5	1	1	7
18	(Algeria)	Aboubaker Rebih	FW	5	0	0	5
10	(Algeria)	Amar Ammour	MF	3	1	1	5
21	(Algeria)	Mohamed Amroune	FW	3	0	0	3
34	(Algeria)	Merouane Dahar	FW	2	0	0	2
23	(Algeria)	Hakim Khoudi	DF	2	0	0	2
27	(Benin)	Pascal Angan	MF	0	1	1	2
29	(Nigeria)	Onome Sodje	FW	1	0	1	2
7	(Algeria)	Farès Hamiti	FW	1	0	0	1
13	(Algeria)	Merouane Anane	MF	1	0	0	1
12	(Algeria)	Mohamed Ismail Kherbache	MF	1	0	0	1
5	(Algeria)	Sofiane Harkat	DF	0	0	1	1
	(Algeria)	Ahmed Tafat	MF	1	0	0	1
20	(Algeria)	Amine Aksas	DF	1	0	0	1
Own Goals				0	1	0	1
Totals				32	8	7	47

== Transfers ==
=== In ===
Date	Pos	Player	From club	Transfer fee	Source
June 2012	MF	(Algeria) Saad Sahraoui	Olympique de Médéa	Undisclosed	
19 June 2012	DF	(Algeria) Sofiane Harkat	MC Alger	Undisclosed	
27 June 2012	MF	(Algeria) Mehdi Benaldjia	USM Alger	Loan	
28 June 2012	FW	(Algeria) Farès Hamiti	USM Alger	Free transfer (Released)	
1 July 2012	GK	(Algeria) Ahmed Walid Chouih	MO Constantine	Undisclosed	
1 July 2012	DF	(Algeria) Hakim Khoudi	IRB Lakhdaria	Free transfer	
1 July 2012	DF	(Algeria) Adel Messaoudi	USM El Harrach	Undisclosed	
6 July 2012	MF	(Benin) Pascal Angan	(Morocco) Wydad Casablanca	Free transfer	
7 July 2012	FW	(Nigeria) Onome Sodje	(Malta) Floriana	Free transfer	
1 January 2013	MF	(Algeria) Fodil Hadjadj	ASO Chlef	Free transfer	
14 January 2013	DF	(Algeria) Amine Aksas	MC Alger	Undisclosed	
15 January 2013	FW	(Algeria) (Tunisia) Merouane Dahar	(Tunisia) ES Sahel U23	Undisclosed	

=== Out ===
Date	Pos	Player	To club	Transfer fee	Source
26 June 2012	DF	(Algeria) Farès Benabderahmane	ES Sétif	Undisclosed	
4 July 2012	MF	(Algeria) Mohamed El Amine Aouad	MC Oran	Undisclosed	
1 August 2012	GK	(Algeria) Hamza Dahmane	MC Oran	Undisclosed	
6 January 2013	DF	(Algeria) Abdelkrim Mammeri	ES Sétif	Undisclosed	
