= 2014–15 CS Constantine season =

CS Constantine
2014–15 season
- Owner: Tassili Airlines
- Chairman: Omar Bentobal
- Head coach: Diego Garzitto (from 7 July 2014); Rachid Belhout
- Stadium: Stade Mohamed Hamlaoui
- Ligue 1: 5th
- Algerian Cup: Round of 16
- Top goalscorer: League: Hamza Boulemdaïs (14); All: Hamza Boulemdaïs (15)
Home colours	Away colours

In the 2014–15 season, CS Constantine competed in the Ligue 1 for the 19th season, as well as the Algerian Cup.

== Squad list ==
Players and squad numbers last updated on 18 November 2014.
Note: Flags indicate national team as has been defined under FIFA eligibility rules. Players may hold more than one non-FIFA nationality.

No.	Nat.	Position	Name	Date of Birth (Age)	Signed from
Goalkeepers
1	(Algeria)	GK	Hamza Dahmane	22 September 1990 (aged 24)	(Algeria) MC Oran
18	(Algeria)	GK	Nadjib Ghoul	12 September 1985 (aged 29)	(Algeria) ES Sétif
71	(Algeria)	GK	Cédric Si Mohamed	9 January 1985 (aged 29)	(Algeria) JSM Béjaïa
Defenders
7	(Algeria)	RB	Hamid Bahri	13 October 1989 (aged 25)	(Algeria) MO Béjaïa
	(Algeria)	RB	Samir Belfodil	7 November 1994 (aged 20)	Youth system
4	(Mali)	RB	Ousmane Berthé	5 February 1987 (aged 27)	(South Africa) Jomo Cosmos
88	(Algeria)	RB	Belkacem Remache	12 October 1985 (aged 29)	(Algeria) JS Kabylie
28	(Algeria)	RB	Amer Belakhdar	20 January 1980 (aged 34)	(Algeria) JSM Béjaïa
22	(Algeria)	RB	Mohamed Walid Bencherifa	6 November 1988 (aged 26)	(Algeria) JS Kabylie
29	(France) (Algeria)	RB	Rachid Bouhenna	29 June 1991 (aged 23)	(France) AFC Compiègne
17	(France) (Algeria)	RB	Lucas Rouabah	9 May 1990 (aged 24)	(France) AS Cannes
Midfielders
20	(Algeria)	CM	Fouad Allag	17 April 1985 (aged 29)	(Algeria) NA Hussein Dey
15	(Algeria)	CM	Antar Boucherit	18 December 1983 (aged 31)	(Algeria) JS Saoura
10	(Algeria)	CM	Abou El Kacem Hadji	22 August 1990 (aged 24)	(Algeria) JSM Béjaïa
13	(Algeria)	CM	Abdelhak Sameur	12 November 1990 (aged 24)	(Algeria) WA Tlemcen
16	(Algeria)	CM	Merouane Anane	31 May 1990 (aged 24)	(Algeria) CR Belouizdad
21	(France) (Algeria)	CM	Elias M'Baye	27 July 1989 (aged 25)	(France) AS Yzeure
8	(France) (Algeria)	CM	Ahmed Rani	20 August 1987 (aged 27)	(Luxembourg) CS Fola Esch
30	(Algeria)	CM	Abdelmalek Djeghbala	1 March 1983 (aged 31)	(Algeria) MC Alger
	(France) (Algeria)	CM	Otman Djellilahine	12 February 1987 (aged 27)	(Thailand) BEC Tero Sasana
	(Algeria)	CM	Youssef Laouafi		Youth system
Forwards
14	(Algeria)	RW	Hamza Boulemdaïs	22 November 1982 (aged 32)	(Algeria) JS Kabylie
99	(Algeria)	RW	Ahmed Messadia	15 June 1986 (aged 28)	(Algeria) JS Kabylie
11	(Madagascar)	RW	Paulin Voavy	10 November 1987 (aged 27)	(France) AS Cannes
24	(France) (Algeria)	RW	Toufik Guerabis	31 July 1991 (aged 23)	(France)
39	(Algeria)	RW	Belkacem Zobiri	23 October 1983 (aged 31)	(Algeria) AS Cannes
	(Mauritania)	RW	Cheikh Moulaye Ahmed	5 December 1987 (aged 27)	(Algeria) JS Kabylie

== Pre-season and friendlies ==
25 July 2014 Friendly	CS Constantine (Algeria)	1–0	(Spain) Celta de Vigo	Constantine
23:00 UTC+1	Boulemdaïs 60' (pen.)	Report		Stadium: Stade Mohamed Hamlaoui

== Competitions ==
=== Overview ===
Competition	Record								Started round	Final position / round	First match	Last match
Competition	G	W	D	L	GF	GA	GD	Win %	Started round	Final position / round	First match	Last match
Ligue 1	30	11	9	10	32	31	+1	36.67	—N/a	5th	16 August 2014	29 May 2015
Algerian Cup	3	2	0	1	3	2	+1	66.67	Round of 64	Round of 16	13 December 2014	20 February 2015
Total	33	13	9	11	35	33	+2	39.39				

=== Ligue 1 ===
The Ligue 1 2014-2015 is the fifty-first edition of Algerian Ligue Professionnelle 1 and the fifth under the name Ligue 1. Division opposes sixteen clubs in a series of thirty meetings. The best in the league qualify for the African cups that are the Champions League (the podium) and Confederation Cup (the third and the winner national cup).

The relegated the previous season, JSM Bejaia on CA Bordj Bou Arreridj and CRB Ain Fakroun are replaced by USM Bel-Abbès, Ligue 2 in 2013-2014 after a year's absence, the ASM Oran, 7 years after his last appearance at the highest national level, and NA Hussein Dey relegated to Ligue 2 during the 2010–2011 season.

==== League table ====
Pos	Team	Pld	W	D	L	GF	GA	GD	Pts	Qualification or relegation
3	MC Oran	30	11	11	8	19	19	0	44	2016 CAF Confederation Cup
4	USM El Harrach	30	13	4	13	30	32	−2	43	
5	CS Constantine	30	11	9	10	32	31	+1	42 (Note: CSC 3-1 CRB; CRB 1-1 CSC)	2016 CAF Confederation Cup
6	CR Belouizdad	30	11	9	10	27	34	−7	42	
7	ASM Oran	30	11	8	11	33	37	−4	41 (Note: USMA 1-2 ASMO; ASMO 1-0 USMA)	

Updated to match(es) played on 29 May 2015. Source: DZFoot
Rules for classification: 1) points; 2) head-to-head points; 3) head-to-head goal difference; 4) goal difference; 5) total goals; 6) fairplay ranking; 7) playoff

==== Results summary ====
Overall								Home						Away					
Pld	W	D	L	GF	GA	GD	Pts	W	D	L	GF	GA	GD	W	D	L	GF	GA	GD
30	11	9	10	32	31	+1	42	8	6	1	23	11	+12	3	3	9	9	20	−11

Last updated: 29 December 2014.
Source: Competitive matches

==== Results by round ====
Round	1	2	3	4	5	6	7	8	9	10	11	12	13	14	15	16	17	18	19	20	21	22	23	24	25	26	27	28	29	30
Ground	H	A	H	H	A	H	A	H	A	H	A	H	A	H	A	A	H	A	A	H	A	H	A	H	A	H	A	H	A	H
Result	W	W	W	D	L	W	L	D	L	D	W	W	D	L	L	D	W	L	L	D	L	W	L	D	D	W	W	D	L	W
Position	1	1	1	1	1	1	1	2	3	4	2	2	3	5	5	7	4	6	8	9	10	9	10	10	11	9	6	6	10	5

Updated to match(es) played on 29 December 2014. Source: Competitive matches
A = Away; H = Home; W = Win; D = Draw; L = Loss

==== Matches ====
16 August 2014 1	CS Constantine	3–1	CR Belouizdad	Constantine
19:00	Boulemdaïs 28', 55'; Sameur 44'	Report	66' Cherfaoui	Stadium: Stade Mohamed Hamlaoui; Referee: Benouza, Bouhassoun, Omari

23 August 2014 2	RC Arbaâ	0–1	CS Constantine	Larbaâ
17:00		Report	32' Rouabah	Stadium: Stade Ismaïl Makhlouf; Referee: Bekouassa, Bounoua, Bourouba

13 September 2014 3	CS Constantine	4–1	USM El Harrach	Constantine
19:00	Boulemdaïs 14', 37', 53'; Hadji 73'	Report	90' Abid	Stadium: Stade Mohamed Hamlaoui; Referee: Benbraham, Chebala, Aloua

19 September 2014 4	CS Constantine	2–2	MC El Eulma	Constantine
17:45	Boulemdaïs 26' (pen.); Sameur 43'	Report	37', 57' Chenihi	Stadium: Stade Mohamed Hamlaoui; Referee: Halalchi, Bachir, Doulache

27 September 2014 5	MC Oran	2–1	CS Constantine	Oran
19:00	Za'abia 8'; Nekkache 41'	Report	75' Voavy	Stadium: Stade Ahmed Zabana; Referee: Mial, Semsoum, Idir

2 October 2014 6	CS Constantine	2–1	USM Alger	Constantine
19:00	Allag 13'; Remache 79'	Report	90+5' Seguer	Stadium: Stade Mohamed Hamlaoui; Referee: Ghorbal, Cherchar, Seradj

18 October 2014 7	MO Béjaïa	2–0	CS Constantine	Béjaïa
18:00	Rahal 45' (pen.); Dehouche 87'	Report		Stadium: Stade de l'Unité Maghrébine; Referee: Bassiri, Halem, Bourchou

25 October 2014 8	CS Constantine	0–0	USM Bel-Abbès	Constantine
17:45		Report		Stadium: Stade Mohamed Hamlaoui; Referee: Bichari, Gourari, Salaouadji

31 October 2014 9	NA Hussein Dey	2–0	CS Constantine	Algiers
16:00	Ouznadji 54', 83'	Report		Stadium: Stade 20 Août 1955; Referee: Boukhalfa, Benali, Zerhouni

8 November 2014 10	CS Constantine	0–0	JS Saoura	Constantine
18:00		Report		Stadium: Stade Mohamed Hamlaoui; Referee: Bouslimani, Rimouche, Belbachir

22 November 2014 11	ASO Chlef	0–3	CS Constantine	Chlef
16:00		Report	18' Hadji; 63' Voavy; 73' Messadia	Stadium: Stade Mohamed Boumezrag; Referee: Amalou, Azerine, Bourouba

29 November 2014 12	CS Constantine	1–0	ASM Oran	Constantine
16:00	Boulemdaïs 10'	Report		Stadium: Stade Mohamed Hamlaoui; Referee: Bekouassa, Bounoua, Rachedi

6 December 2014 13	MC Alger	0–0	CS Constantine	Algiers
16:00		Report		Stadium: Stade Omar Hammadi; Referee: Necib, Maghlout, Benacer

21 December 2014 14	CS Constantine	1–2	ES Sétif	Constantine
17:00	Boulemdaïs 39'	Report	19' Djahnit; 79' (pen.) Gasmi	Stadium: Stade Mohamed Hamlaoui; Attendance: 20.000; Referee: Benouza, Ghomari, Hallam

31 December 2014 15	JS Kabylie	2–1	CS Constantine	Algiers
15:00	Ihadjadene 19'; Abdul-Raheem 84'	Report	37' Boulemdaïs	Stadium: Stade 20 Août 1955; Attendance: 0 (close doors); Referee: Ghorbal, Serradj, Cherchar

20 January 2015 16	CR Belouizdad	1–1	CS Constantine	Algiers
17:00	Chebira 55'	Report	17' Sameur	Stadium: Stade 20 Août 1955; Referee: Saidi, Bechirène, Rezgane

24 January 2015 17	CS Constantine	2–0	RC Arbaâ	Constantine
16:00	Boulemdaïs 52', 61' (pen.)	Report		Stadium: Stade Mohamed Hamlaoui; Referee: Mial, Idir, Semsoum

31 January 2015 18	USM El Harrach	1–0	CS Constantine	Algiers
15:00	Abid 74'	Report		Stadium: Stade 1er Novembre 1954; Referee: Boukhalfa, Zerhouni, Ayad

6 February 2015 19	MC El Eulma	3–0	CS Constantine	El Eulma
16:00	Maïza 55'; Hemitti 62'; Derrardja 74'	Report		Stadium: Stade Messaoud Zougar; Referee: Bichari, Gourari, Belbachir

14 February 2015 20	CS Constantine	0–0	MC Oran	Constantine
16:00		Report		Stadium: Stade Mohamed Hamlaoui; Referee: Amalou, Azrine, Bourouba

24 February 2015 21	USM Alger	2–0	CS Constantine	Algiers
18:00	Benmoussa 30'; Belaïli 32'	Report		Stadium: Stade Omar Hammadi; Referee: Lahlou Benbraham

7 March 2015 22	CS Constantine	1–0	MO Béjaïa	Constantine
16:00	Voavy 10'	Report		Stadium: Stade Mohamed Hamlaoui; Referee: Ghorbal, Serradj, Cherchar

20 March 2015 23	USM Bel-Abbès	2–0	CS Constantine	Sidi Bel Abbès
16:00	Khali 15', 67'	Report		Stadium: Stade 24 Fevrier 1956; Referee: Bichari, Salouadji, Baioud

10 April 2015 24	CS Constantine	2–2	NA Hussein Dey	Constantine
16:00	Boucherit 30'; Messadia 40'	Report	11' Ouhadda; 88' Ndouasel	Stadium: Stade Mohamed Hamlaoui; Referee: Boukhalfa, Allaoua, Yahia

17 April 2015 25	JS Saoura	1–1	CS Constantine	Béchar
16:00	Tiouli 45'	Report	43' (pen.) Boucherit	Stadium: Stade 20 Août 1955; Referee: Bekouassa, Bourouba, Rachedi

25 April 2015 26	CS Constantine	1–0	ASO Chlef	Constantine
17:00	Boucherit 33' (pen.)	Report		Stadium: Stade Mohamed Hamlaoui; Referee: Ghorbal, Serradj, Cherchar

9 May 2015 27	ASM Oran	0–1	CS Constantine	Oran
17:00		Report	15' Moulaye Ahmed	Stadium: Stade Ahmed Zabana; Referee: Benbraham, Allaoua, Yahi

16 May 2015 28	CS Constantine	1–1	MC Alger	Constantine
17:00	Boulemdaïs 52'	Report	79' Hachoud	Stadium: Stade Mohamed Hamlaoui; Referee: Arab, Bezine, Hamlaoui

23 May 2015 29	ES Sétif	2–0	CS Constantine	Sétif
17:00	Benyettou 32'; Dagoulou 44'	Report		Stadium: Stade 8 Mai 1945; Referee: Bekouassa, Hamlaoui, Bounoua

29 May 2015 30	CS Constantine	3–1	JS Kabylie	Constantine
17:00	Boulemdaïs 9', 90'; Sameur 14'	Report	21' (pen.) Rial	Stadium: Stade Mohamed Hamlaoui; Referee: Mial, Allaoua, Yahi

== Algerian Cup ==
13 December 2014 Round of 64	CS Constantine	2–1 (a.e.t.)	MC Alger	Constantine
16:00	Boulemdaïs 23' (pen.); Guerabis 98'	Repport	9' (o.g.) Bouba	Stadium: Stade Mohamed Hamlaoui; Attendance: 30.000; Referee: Mial, Semsoum, Idir

26 December 2014 Round of 32	CS Constantine	1–0 (a.e.t.)	USM Bel-Abbès	Constantine
16:00	Voavy 114'	Report		Stadium: Stade Mohamed Hamlaoui; Referee: Benbraham, Alaoua, Cheballa

5 January 2015 Replay	CS Constantine	1–0	USM Bel-Abbès	Blida
16:00	Sameur 35'	Repport		Stadium: Stade Mustapha Tchaker

February 20, 2015 Round of 16	JS Kabylie	1–0	CS Constantine	Bologhine
16:00	Ihadjadène 9'	Repport		Stadium: Stade Omar Hammadi; Referee: Necib, Maghlout, Benacer

== Squad information ==
=== Playing statistics ===
No.	Pos	Nat	Player	Total		Ligue 1		Algerian Cup	
No.	Pos	Nat	Player	Apps	Goals	Apps	Goals	Apps	Goals
Goalkeepers
1	GK	(Algeria) ALG	Hamza Dahmane	2	0	2	0	0	0
18	GK	(Algeria) ALG	Nadjib Ghoul	2	0	2	0	0	0
71	GK	(Algeria) ALG	Cédric Si Mohamed	26	0	26	0	0	0
Defenders
7	DF	(Algeria) ALG	Hamid Bahri	11	0	11	0	0	0
	DF	(Algeria) ALG	Samir Belfodil	0	0	0	0	0	0
4	DF	(Mali) MLI	Ousmane Berthé	16	0	16	0	0	0
88	DF	(Algeria) ALG	Belkacem Remache	28	1	28	1	0	0
28	DF	(Algeria) ALG	Amer Belakhdar	7	0	7	0	0	0
22	DF	(Algeria) ALG	Mohamed Walid Bencherifa	29	0	29	0	0	0
29	DF	(Algeria) ALG	Rachid Bouhenna	19	0	19	0	0	0
17	DF	(Algeria) ALG	Lucas Rouabah	8	2	8	2	0	0
30	DF	(Algeria) ALG	Abdelmalek Djeghbala	16	0	16	0	0	0
Midfielders
20	MF	(Algeria) ALG	Fouad Allag	21	0	21	0	0	0
15	MF	(Algeria) ALG	Antar Boucherit	14	3	14	3	0	0
10	MF	(Algeria) ALG	Abou El Kacem Hadji	17	2	17	2	0	0
13	MF	(Algeria) ALG	Abdelhak Sameur	27	4	27	4	0	0
16	MF	(Algeria) ALG	Merouane Anane	9	0	9	0	0	0
21	MF	(Algeria) ALG	Elias M'Baye	8	0	8	0	0	0
8	MF	(Algeria) ALG	Ahmed Rani	12	0	12	0	0	0
	MF	(Algeria) ALG	Otman Djellilahine	10	0	10	0	0	0
	MF	(Algeria) ALG	Youssef Laouafi	0	0	0	0	0	0
Forwards
14	FW	(Algeria) ALG	Hamza Boulemdaïs	23	14	23	14	0	0
99	FW	(Algeria) ALG	Ahmed Messadia	21	2	21	2	0	0
11	FW	(Madagascar) MAD	Paulin Voavy	26	3	26	3	0	0
24	FW	(Algeria) ALG	Toufik Guerabis	27	0	27	0	0	0
39	FW	(Algeria) ALG	Belkacem Zobiri	5	0	5	0	0	0
	FW	(Mauritania) MTN	Cheikh Moulaye Ahmed	11	1	11	1	0	0
Players transferred out during the season
	DF	(Cameroon) CMR	Bouba Aminou	11	0	11	0	0	0

Last updated: 11 June 2018
Source: fr.soccerway.com

=== Goalscorers ===
Includes all competitive matches. The list is sorted alphabetically by surname when total goals are equal.

No.	Nat.	Player	Pos.	Ligue 1	Cup	TOTAL
14	(Algeria)	Hamza Boulemdaïs	FW	14	1	15
13	(Algeria)	Abdelhak Sameur	MF	4	1	5
15	(Algeria)	Antar Boucherit	MF	4	0	4
11	(Madagascar)	Paulin Voavy	FW	3	0	3
10	(Algeria)	Abou El Kacem Hadji	MF	2	0	2
99	(Algeria)	Ahmed Messadia	FW	2	0	2
17	(Algeria)	Lucas Rouabah	DF	2	0	2
24	(Algeria)	Toufik Guerabis	FW	0	1	1
88	(Algeria)	Belkacem Remache	FW	1	0	1
Own Goals				0	0	0
Totals				32	3	35

== Transfers ==
=== In ===
Date	Pos	Player	From club	Transfer fee	Source
1 July 2014	GK	(Algeria) Hamza Dahmane	MC Oran	Free transfer	
1 July 2014	MF	(Algeria) Abou El Kacem Hadji	RC Arbaâ	Free transfer	
1 July 2014	DF	(Algeria) Mohamed Walid Bencherifa	JS Kabylie	Free transfer	
1 July 2014	DF	(Algeria) Lucas Rouabah	(France) AS Cannes	Free transfer	
1 July 2014	DF	(Algeria) Belkacem Remache	JS Kabylie	Free transfer	
1 July 2014	DF	(Algeria) Hamid Bahri	MO Béjaïa	Free transfer	
1 July 2014	MF	(Algeria) Merouane Anane	CR Belouizdad	Free transfer	
1 July 2014	FW	(Algeria) Toufik Guerabis	(France) CSO Amneville	Free transfer	
1 July 2014	FW	(Algeria) Belkacem Zobiri	(France) AS Cannes	Free transfer	
5 July 2014	FW	(Algeria) Ahmed Messadia	JS Kabylie	Free transfer	
5 July 2014	MF	(Senegal) Elias M'Baye	(France) AS Yzeure	Free transfer	
9 July 2014	FW	(Madagascar) Paulin Voavy	(France) AS Cannes	Free transfer	
21 July 2014	DF	(Algeria) Abdelmalek Djeghbala	MC Alger	Free transfer	
13 July 2014	GK	(Algeria) Nadjib Ghoul	ES Sétif	Free transfer	
20 July 2014	MF	(Algeria) Ahmed Rani	(Luxembourg) CS Fola Esch	Free transfer	
24 July 2014	DF	(Cameroon) Bouba Aminou	(Tunisia) Espérance de Tunis	Loan for six months	
11 November 2014	DF	(Algeria) Antar Boucherit	JS Saoura	Free transfer	
13 January 2015	FW	(Mauritania) Cheikh Moulaye Ahmed	JS Kabylie	Free transfer	
15 January 2015	MF	(Algeria) Otman Djellilahine	(Thailand) BEC Tero Sasana	Free transfer	
