= Mourad Abdelouahab =

Algerian football manager

Personal information
- Date of death: August 2008
- Place of death: France

Managerial career
- Years: Team
- USM Alger
- 1995–1996: Algeria

Mourad Abdelouahab (died August 2008) was an Algerian football manager.

== Career ==
Abdelouahab managed the Algerian national team, as well as club side USM Alger.
