= Nadjib Maâziz =

Algerian footballer (born 1989)

Personal information
- Full name: Nadjib Maâziz
- Date of birth: 4 May 1989 (age 37)
- Place of birth: Beni Messous, Algeria
- Position: Defender

Team information
- Current team: MCB Oued Sly
- Number: 4

Senior career*
Years	Team	Apps	(Gls)
2009–2012	CR Belouizdad	19	(0)
2012–2013	USM Bel Abbès	0	(0)
2013–2015	Olympique de Médéa	0	(0)
2015–2017	JS Saoura	0	(0)
2017–2018	NA Hussein Dey	0	(0)
2019	USM Blida		
2019–2020	NC Magra		
2020–	MCB Oued Sly		

International career^{‡}
2007–2008	Algeria U20	5	(0)
2010–	Algeria U23	0	(0)
- * Club domestic league appearances and goals as of 10:00, 15 January 2019 (UTC) ‡ National team caps and goals as of 10:00, 23 February 2011 (UTC)

Nadjib Maâziz (born 4 May 1989) is an Algerian football player who plays for MCB Oued Sly in the Algerian Ligue Professionnelle 2.
