= Miguel Ángel Gamondi =

Argentine footballer and manager

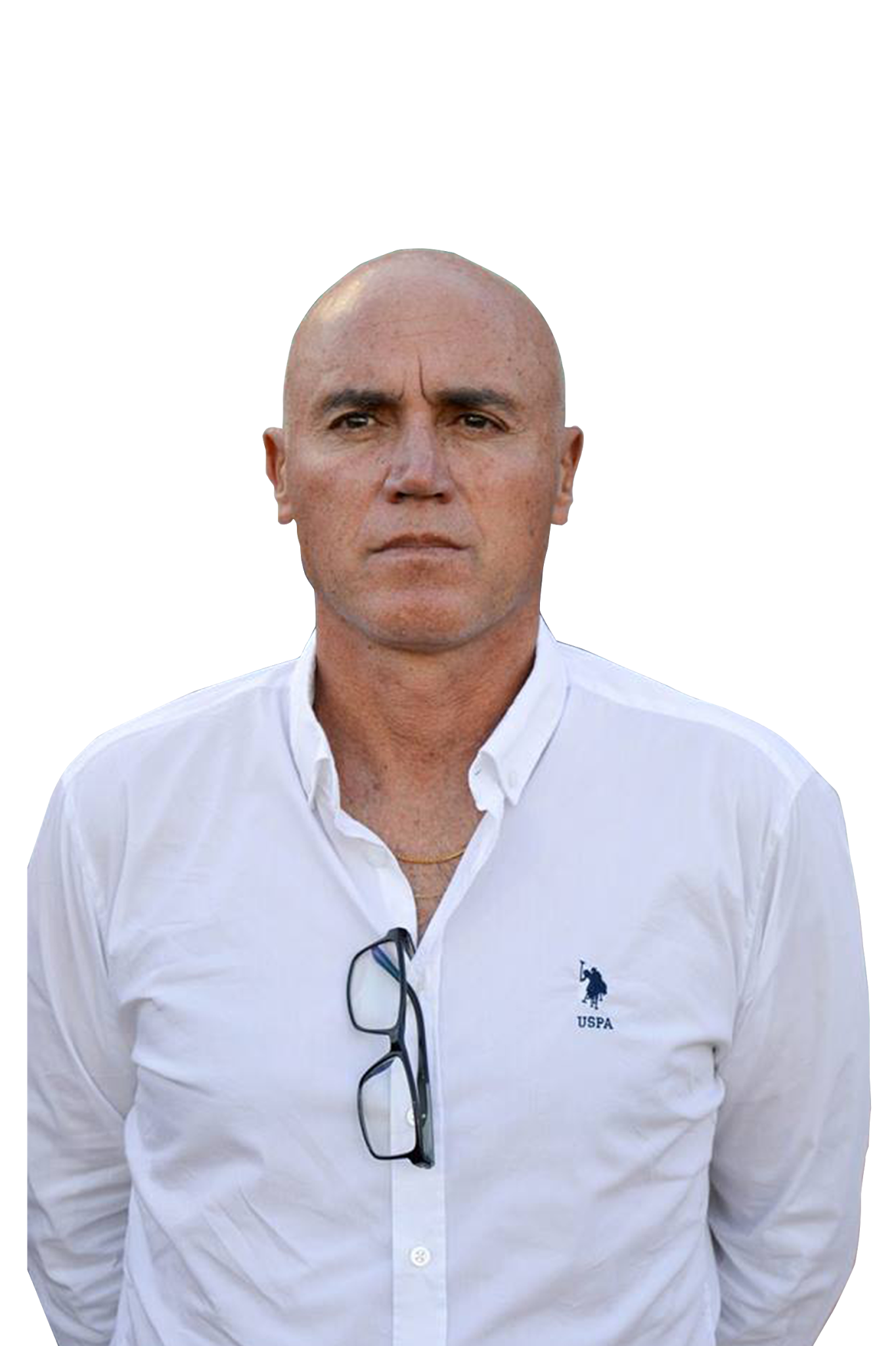

Personal information
- Full name: Miguel Ángel Gamondi
- Date of birth: 30 November 1966 (age 59)
- Place of birth: Olavarría, Argentina
- Height: 1.85 m (6 ft 1 in)

Senior career*
Years	Team	Apps	(Gls)
–1987	Ferrocarril Sud		

Managerial career
- 1998–1999: Racing Club (assistant)
- 2000: Al-Ahly (Tripoli) (assistant)
- 2001–2002: Burkina Faso (assistant)
- 2002–2003: Wydad AC (assistant)
- 2004: Espérance Sportive de Tunis (assistant)
- 2005–2006: Mamelodi Sundowns
- 2007: Hassania Agadir
- 2007–2009: Platinum Stars
- 2010–2011: CR Belouizdad
- 2011–2012: Ittihad Kalba
- 2012: USM Alger
- 2013–2014: CR Belouizdad
- 2014: Al Urooba
- 2015–2017: Hassania Agadir (technical director)
- 2017–2019: Hassania Agadir
- 2020: Wydad AC
- 2021–2022: IR Tanger
- 2023–2024: Young Africans
- 2025: Al Nasr
- 2025: Singida Black Stars
- 2025–: Tanzania
- * Club domestic league appearances and goals

Miguel Ángel Gamondi (born 30 November 1966) is an Argentine football manager and former player.

== Career ==
Born in Olavarría, Gamondi played football for local side Club Ferrocarril Sud.

After he retired from playing, Gamondi managed several clubs in Argentina, including Ferro Carril Sud, Racing, El Fortín, San Martín de Tucumán and Racing Club de Avellaneda.

In 2000, Gamondi moved to Africa to join Oscar Fulloné as an assistant coach to the Libyan side Al-Ahly. He also became an assistant coach to Fulloné at the Burkina Faso national football team in December 2001, and would later become an assistant coach at ASEC Mimosas, Wydad Casablanca, Espérance Sportive de Tunis and Étoile du Sahel.

He was appointed assistant manager to Ángel Cappa at South African side Mamelodi Sundowns in 2005. He was appointed manager of Platinum Stars in December 2007, and led Stars into the final 16 of the 2008 CAF Confederation Cup, its first foray into continental competition.

Later he managed CR Belouizdad and USM Alger in Algeria, Ittihad Kalba and Al Urooba in the United Arab Emirates, then Hassania Agadir, Wydad AC and Ittihad Tanger in Morocco.

In February 2025, he was appointed manager of Al Nasr of Libya but was terminated from his position after five matches.

In February 2026, Tanzania's Ministry of Sports extended Gamondi's contract to coach national football team.

== Honours ==
=== Singida Black Stars ===
- CECAFA Club Championship
  - Winners (1): 2025 Kagame Interclub Cup
