= Hocine Fenier =

Algerian footballer (born 1983)

Personal information
- Full name: Hocine Fenier
- Date of birth: March 5, 1983 (age 43)
- Place of birth: Taher, Algeria
- Height: 1.76 m (5 ft 9 in)
- Position: Forward

Senior career*
Years	Team	Apps	(Gls)
2002–2003	FC Taher		
2003–2006	CS Constantine	47	(12)
2006–2008	USM Annaba	37	(6)
2008–2010	CR Belouizdad	26	(4)
2010–2011	MC Saïda	2	(1)
2011–2012	MO Béjaïa		
2012–2013	CRB Aïn Fakroun		

International career^{‡}
2005	Algeria	1	(0)
- * Club domestic league appearances and goals as of 27 October 2010 ‡ National team caps and goals as of 27 October 2010

Hocine Fenier (Arabic: حسين فنر; born 5 March 1983) is an Algerian footballer who plays for MC Saïda in the Algerian Ligue Professionnelle 1.
