= Alex Somian =

Ivorian footballer (born 1986)

Personal information
- Full name: Mouhoubé Alex Somian
- Date of birth: 6 June 1986 (age 40)
- Place of birth: Abidjan, Ivory Coast
- Height: 1.80 m (5 ft 11 in)
- Position: Defensive midfielder

Senior career*
Years	Team	Apps	(Gls)
2004–2006	Stella Club d'Adjamé		
2006–2007	Jeunesse Club d'Abidjan		
2007–2008	ES Setif		
2008–2010	CR Belouizdad		
2010–2011	FC Shinnik Yaroslavl	7	(0)
2012–2014	Kazma	18	(0)
2014–2015	Stade Tunisien		
- * Club domestic league appearances and goals as of 14:03, 23 November 2010 (UTC)

Mouhoubé Alex Somian (born 6 June 1986 in Abidjan) is an Ivorian footballer.

== Club career ==
Somian played for Jeunesse Club d'Abidjan and Stella Club d'Adjamé in the Ivory Coast Premier Soccer League, before being bought by ES Setif of Algeria in 2007. Somian showed good performances in his first year in the Algerian League and was quickly bought by CR Belouizdad from ES Setif. Somian was named the most valuable player in Algerian League in 2008.

On 2 January, Somian signed for Kuwaiti Premier League side Kazma.

He currently plays for Stade Tunisien in the Tunisian Ligue 1.
