= Youcef Saïbi =

Algerian footballer (born 1982)

Personal information
- Full name: Youcef Saïbi
- Date of birth: 22 August 1982 (age 44)
- Place of birth: Algiers, Algeria
- Height: 1.85 m (6 ft 1 in)
- Position: Forward

Team information
- Current team: NA Hussein Dey
- Number: 23

Senior career*
Years	Team	Apps	(Gls)
2005–2006	WR Bentalha	-	(-)
2006–2008	JS Kabylie	-	(-)
2008–2009	USM El Harrach	14	(9)
2009	→ Al-Ahli Jeddah (loan)	7	(3)
2009–2011	CR Belouizdad	43	(11)
2011–	NA Hussein Dey	2	(1)
- * Club domestic league appearances and goals as of 00:00, 20 September 2011 (UTC)

Youcef Saïbi (born 22 August 1982) is an Algerian football player who is currently playing as a forward for NA Hussein Dey in the Algerian Ligue Professionnelle 1.

== Career ==
=== NA Hussein Dey ===
On 12 August 2011 Saïbi signed a two-year contract with newly promoted NA Hussein Dey. On 10 September 2011 he made his official debut for the club as a starter in a league match against ES Sétif, scoring two goals in a 3–2 loss.

== Honours ==
- Won the Algerian League once with JS Kabylie in 2008
