= Khalil Boukedjane =

Algerian footballer (born 1981)

Personal information
- Full name: Khalil Boukedjane
- Date of birth: January 27, 1981 (age 45)
- Place of birth: El Biar, Algiers, Algeria
- Height: 1.80 m (5 ft 11 in)
- Position: Defender

Youth career
- 1995–1999: RC Boumerdés

Senior career*
| Years | Team | Apps | (Gls) |
| 1999–2002 | ESM Boudouaou | - | (-) |
| 2002–2005 | RC Kouba | - | (-) |
| 2005–2014 | CR Belouizdad | 85 | (1) |
- * Club domestic league appearances and goals

Khalil Boukedjane (born January 27, 1981, in El Biar) is a former Algerian footballer.

== Club career ==
In June 2005, Boukedjane joined CR Belouizdad.

== Honours ==
- Won the Algerian Cup once with CR Belouizdad in 2009
