= Ahmed Mekehout =

Algerian footballer (born 1983)

Personal information
- Full name: Ahmed Mekehout
- Date of birth: April 4, 1983 (age 43)
- Place of birth: Taher, Algeria
- Position: Midfielder

Team information
- Current team: JS Kabylie

Senior career*
Years	Team	Apps	(Gls)
2005–2007	MO Constantine	-	(-)
2007–2008	CR Belouizdad	-	(-)
2008–2009	USM Annaba	-	(-)
2009–2014	CR Belouizdad	79	(0)
2014–	JS Kabylie	0	(0)
- * Club domestic league appearances and goals as of 00:00, 17 June 2011 (UTC)

Ahmed Mekehout (born April 4, 1983) is an Algerian football player. He currently plays for JS Kabylie in the Algerian Ligue Professionnelle 1.

== Club career ==
On July 6, 2009, Mekehout returned to CR Belouizdad after spending a season with USM Annaba.

On June 16, 2011, Mekehout, along with his CR Belouizdad teammate Amine Aksas, agreed to join Saudi Arabian club Al-Qadisiyah FC on a one-year contract.

== International career ==
In April 2008, Mekehout was called up to the Algerian A' National Team for 2009 African Nations Championship qualifier against Morocco.
