= Hamza Dahmane =

Algerian footballer (born 1990)

Personal information
- Full name: Hamza Dahmane
- Date of birth: September 22, 1990 (age 36)
- Place of birth: Bourouba, Algeria
- Position: Goalkeeper

Team information
- Current team: US Gieres

Youth career
- –2009: CR Belouizdad

Senior career*
Years	Team	Apps	(Gls)
2009–2012	CR Belouizdad	9	(0)
2012–2014	MC Oran	29	(0)
2014–2016	CS Constantine	2	(0)
2016–2017	ASM Oran	23	(0)
2017–2019	FC Échirolles		
2019–	US Gieres		

International career
2010	Algeria U23	3	(0)
- * Club domestic league appearances and goals as of 7 January 2018

Hamza Dahmane (born September 22, 1990) is an Algerian football player who plays as a goalkeeper for French club US Gieres.

He been capped for Algeria at the under-23 level.

== Club career ==
On March 29, 2010, Dahmane made his senior debut for CR Belouizdad as a starter in a league match against ES Sétif.

In August 2017, Dahmane joined FC Échirolles. Two years later, he joined US Gieres.

== International career ==
In May 2010, after making his senior debut for CR Belouizdad, Dahmane was called up by Algeria's Under-23 coach, Abdelhak Benchikha, for a 10-day training camp in Italy's Coverciano training complex. On November 16, 2011, he was selected as part of Algeria's squad for the 2011 CAF U-23 Championship in Morocco.
