= Merouane Anane =

Algerian footballer (born 1990)

Personal information
- Full name: Merouane Anane
- Date of birth: May 31, 1990 (age 36)
- Place of birth: Algiers, Algeria
- Position: Midfielder

Team information
- Current team: USM El Harrach

Youth career
- –2010: CR Belouizdad

Senior career*
Years	Team	Apps	(Gls)
2010–2014	CR Belouizdad	42	(1)
2014–2016	CS Constantine	?	(?)
2016–2020	RC Relizane	?	(?)
2020–	USM El Harrach	?	(?)

International career^{‡}
2010–	Algeria U23	5	(0)
- * Club domestic league appearances and goals as of 00:00, February 13, 2013 (UTC) ‡ National team caps and goals as of 00:00, February 13, 2013 (UTC)

Merouane Anane (born May 31, 1990) is an Algerian footballer. He currently plays for USM El Harrach in the Algerian Ligue 2.

== Club career ==
On September 25, 2010, Anane made his professional debut for CR Belouizdad as a starter against MC Saïda in the first week of the 2010–11 Algerian Ligue Professionnelle 1. Anane was substituted off in the 60th minute as CR Belouizdad went on to lose 2–1.

== International career ==
On November 30, 2011, Anane was called up to the Algerian Under-23 National Team by manager Azzedine Aït Djoudi for a five-day training camp in Algiers. On November 16, 2011, he was selected as part of Algeria's squad for the 2011 CAF U-23 Championship in Morocco.
