= Mohamed Ousserir =

Algerian footballer (born 1978)

Personal information
- Full name: Mohamed Nassim Ousserir
- Date of birth: 5 February 1978 (age 48)
- Place of birth: Boufarik, Algeria
- Height: 1.83 m (6 ft 0 in)
- Position: Goalkeeper

Youth career
- 1993–1995: USM Blida
- 1995–1999: RC Kouba

Senior career*
Years	Team	Apps	(Gls)
1999–2004	RC Kouba	134	(0)
2004–2007	NA Hussein Dey	70	(0)
2007	→ CR Belouizdad (loan)	7	(0)
2007–2013	CR Belouizdad	128	(0)
2013–2015	MC El Eulma	40	(0)
2015–2017	Olympique Médéa	25	(0)
Total		404	(0)

International career^{‡}
2003–2008	Algeria	5	(0)
- * Club domestic league appearances and goals as of 00:00, 18 June 2017 (EST) ‡ National team caps and goals as of 00:00, 18 June 2017 (EST)

Mohamed Nassim Ousserir (born 5 February 1978 in Boufarik, Blida) is a retired Algerian footballer who played as a goalkeeper. Ousserir had 5 caps for the Algeria national football team and was part of Algeria's squad at the 2010 Africa Cup of Nations.

== International career ==
Ousserir received his first cap for the Algerian National Team on 24 April 2003, in a 3–1 friendly win against Madagascar in Amiens, France.

He was a member of the team which finished fourth at the 2010 African Cup of Nations in Angola, but did not participate in any games.

Ousserir has 5 caps for the Algeria National Team and still receives regular call-ups.

== National team statistics ==
Algeria national team
Year	Apps	Goals
2003	4	0
2004	0	0
2005	0	0
2006	0	0
2007	0	0
2008	1	0
Total	5	0
