= Abdelkrim Mameri =

Algerian footballer (born 1981)

Personal information
- Full name: Abdelkrim Mameri
- Date of birth: January 12, 1981 (age 45)
- Place of birth: Boufarik, Algeria
- Position: Defender

Team information
- Current team: ES Sétif

Senior career*
Years	Team	Apps	(Gls)
2006–2007	WA Boufarik	-	(-)
2007–2013	CR Belouizdad	142	(2)
2013–	ES Sétif	0	(0)
- * Club domestic league appearances and goals

Abdelkrim Mameri (born January 12, 1981, in Boufarik) is an Algerian football player who is currently playing as a defender for ES Sétif in the Algerian Ligue Professionnelle 1.

Mameri captained CRB to its sixth Algerian Cup title in 2009.
