= CR Belouizdad =

Algerian association football club

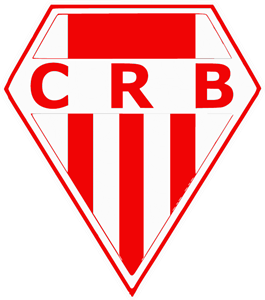
- Full name: Chabab Riadhi Belouizdad
- Nicknames: The Chababists, The Reds, The Belouizdadis, The Belcourtois
- Founded: 15 July 1962; 64 years ago (as Chabab Riadhi de Belcourt)
- Ground: Nelson Mandela Stadium, 20 August 1955 Stadium
- Capacity: 40,784, 15,000
- Owner: MADAR Holding
- President: Mohamed Arar
- Manager: Nabil Maâloul
- League: Ligue 1
- 2025–26: Ligue 1, 3rd of 16
- Website: crb.dz
Home colours	Away colours	Third colours

Chabab Riadhi Belouizdad (Arabic: الشباب الرياضي لبلوزداد); known as CR Belouizdad or simply CRB for short, is an Algerian professional football club based in Algiers, Algeria, that plays in the Ligue Professionnelle 1, the top flight of Algerian football. The club has competed in the top division for a record 55 seasons.

CRB was founded on 15 July 1962, ten days after the independence of Algeria, as Chabab Riadhi de Belcourt, by the merger of two clubs from the same district, the Widad Riadhi de Belcourt and the Club Athéltique de Belcourt, and has played at its current home ground, 20 August 1955 Stadium, ever since. Belouizdad also use the Nelson Mandela Stadium for home games. CRB has traditionally worn a white home kit with the red trademark "V" on the front since its inception.

Belouizdad has produced several notable players and established itself as a major force in both Algerian and Maghrebin football during the 1960s and 1970s, winning 10 major trophies in 8 seasons. CRB is one of the most successful clubs in Algeria (and has the most trophies in the capital city), having won the domestic league title ten times, the Algerian Cup a record 9 times, one Algerian League Cup, two Algerian Super Cups and the Maghreb Champions Cup a record three times.

In 2010, CRB obtained professional status following a reform of the league to professionalize the Algerian football. They won their first title of champion of Algeria at the end of the 1964–1965 season, three years after their creation.

Madar Holding Group is, since 15 October 2018, the majority shareholder of the sports company by shares CRB "Athletic", after acquiring 67% of the 75% of the shares held by the amateur sports Club (CSA), chaired by Karim Chettouf. The board of directors is, since 22 September 2021, chaired by Mohamed Belhadj, replacing Mohamed Abrouk (who held this post after Charaf-Eddine Amara was elected President of the Algerian Football Federation on 16 April 2021), and will have a purely administrative mission, since it was agreed that everything related to the sport component will be managed by the new director general, Hocine Yahi, who agreed to hold this position on 30 March 2021, replacing Toufik Korichi. The first team is managed by Marcos Paquetá since 23 September 2021, replacing Zoran Manojlović.

Belouizdad is still and has long been one of the most popular football teams in Algeria, and has local rivalries with neighbors MC Algiers, NA Hussein Dey and USM Algiers.

== History ==
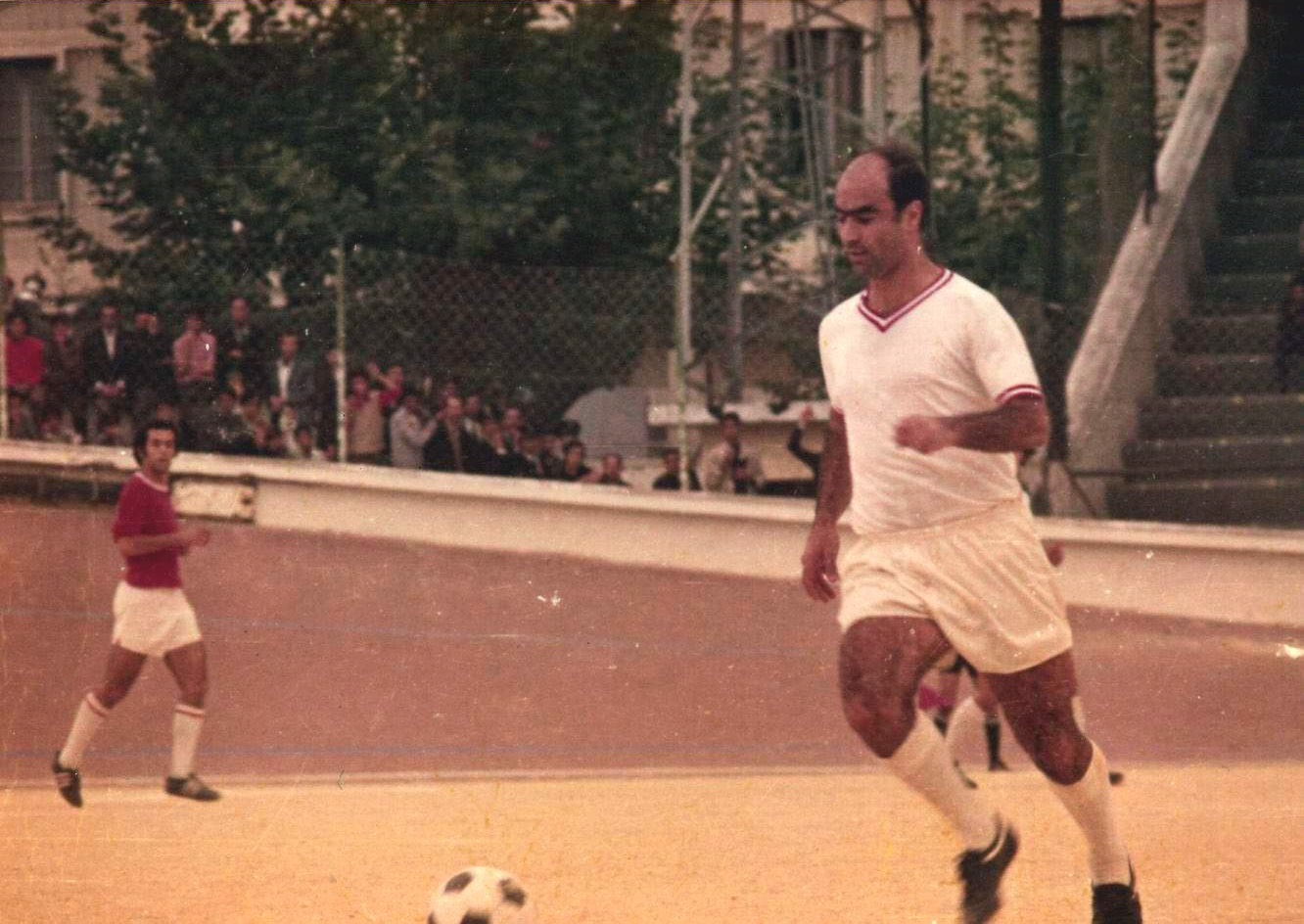
The footballer Hacène Lalmas that made the heyday of CR Belouizdad between seasons 1962–1963 and 1972–1973

The club was founded in 1962 (following the independence of Algeria). It was born out of a merger of two former clubs from the same district; 'Widad Riadhi Belcourt' (former club of the rue de Lyon) and the 'Athletic Club de Belcourt' . These two former clubs were known for playing football competitions in the French colonial era, and both were affiliated to the 'FFFA' (French Football Federation) and the 'FLOT' '(Algiers Ligue de Football Association).

=== 1963–1972: The great Chabab ===
CRB is a club that has done well in Algerian football since its establishment, particularly during the period between 1963 and 1972. This period saw Chabab break records so far unparalleled, beginning with winning 10 titles during 8 seasons. Players wore the famous red and white colours which were worn by the best players in Algeria and also constituted the pillars of the national team of Algeria. Among the players were Lalmas (who was chosen as the best Algerian player of all time after a survey conducted by the Echibek sports weekly in 1993 including votes from more than 350 technical people from Algerian coaches to players), Kalem, Achour and Selmi to name a few.

With Boukida Djeloul as chairman, and under the leadership of Yahia Saâdi as coach, the goal of the first season in the championship (1962–63) was the adaptation of the team and group cohesion. In this season, the CRB was in the group of Bologhine and Bousmail and was content to win a place allowing it to participate in the center of the championship.

=== Second period ===
During this period, CRB drew significant attention and support from the residents of Belcourt and surrounding neighborhoods, leading to widespread community participation in fundraising efforts. Major traders at that time, including Boukida, Bouhelal, and Khemissa, contributed substantial funds to support the club's administrative and operational goals.

=== Third Period ===
After collecting the necessary funds, club leaders began the recruitment process. Targeted recruitment and quality resulting in the arrival of experienced and promising players such as (Zitouni, Paris Club), (Madani and Djemaâ USM Alger), (Zerar Hamam El-Enf, Tunisia), (Nassou and Amar Ain Beniane), (Koussim ES Setif), (Achour and Lalmas OM Ruisseau) and (Kalem IR Hussein-Dey). At first, the results of the team were just average, with defeats against MC Oran (3–2), Batna (1–0), Constantine (1–0), Sidon (2–1) and MCA (2–1). The following season, in 1965–1966, CRB woke up and crushed everyone in its path. They made a spectacular comeback, moving from last place to first, after a good series of 9 consecutive victories starting with a victory against ASM Oran (0–1) during the 14th day and overwhelming wins (8–1), (8–0) and (4–1) respectively against MO Constantine on 20 August (halftime 0–1 for Constantine), Annaba and ES Mostaganem.

=== 1965–1966: The phenomenal season CRB ===
Lined with Prime Algeria, Chabab collected victories this season (16 wins) with big scores (0–4) in Blida and Oran to the MCO and 5–2 before the NAHD with a percussive attack that also called the Machine Gun Attack and had, to their credit, 63 goals this season: (Lalmas 18 goals, Chanane 14, Kalem 13 and Achour 8), making 53 goals amongst themselves. The CRB also won their first cup of Algeria against RC Kouba (final score 3–1).

The 1966–1967 season was just average for Chabab and the 67–68 season was not any better than the last, despite the recruitment of Selmi Djilali. This small decline was due to unfortunate circumstances as 9 Chabab players participated with the national team who took part in the CAN 1968 tournament in Ethiopia. This saw the return of a team completely decimated and tired after a very long journey but also many injured players for CRB. Mistakes followed against ES Guelma in a late championship match. In two seasons CRB had nothing to put in their trophy cabinet.

Following the appointment of Ahmed Aaran as player-coach, Chabab started regaining form and began to win. In 1968–1969 season they obtained big key wins against NAHD (7–1 and 5–2).

=== 1969–1970: The Triple ===
The CRB made their first hat-trick in the history of Algerian football and obtained their fourth championship. This was largely in range because it was the best season for CRB who had lost only one match; against MC Oran Oran (3–1) so the championship was won in rather special circumstances. Victories followed in the Algerian Cup final against USM Alger (4–1) and in the Maghreb Club Champions Cup against Sfax (Tunisia). Chabab had passed on entering the African Cup of Champions Clubs after threats of reprisal from Senegalese team Joan of Arc against the CRB following a memorable victory in the first leg at Chabab (5–3) in the Stade El-Annasser.

=== 1970–1971 ===
After four games in the championship with a draw and a win against MC Alger and a defeat against MC Oran and Algerian Cup defeat against CS Constantine on penalties (this ended 48–47 and is the official record Algeria, another one!), the CRB had to win the North African Cup to save their season. This resulted in a win against Tunisia (EST) 3–2 after a great final after crushing and Morocco's FAR in the previous round with a stinging 3–0.

This victory was reported in the French sports newspaper the Team and the paper devoted a large space in one of their editions to Chabab Riadhi Belcourt.

=== 1971–1972 ===
It was the beginning of the end of a cycle, and after having started the championship with three great victories against WA Tlemcen (7–0) and JSM Tiaret (8–3) and USM Bel-Abbès (4–1) the team had no more breath and let go, at least on the national scene, as it was still successful in the Cup with a 3rd consecutive win for the Maghreb.

=== Renewal ===
The Shabab failed to win titles between 1978 and 1995 despite the good results that made that the team after all the earlier years, ranking each time 2nd, 3rd or 4th until 1988 where the Chabab experienced the worst season in its history characterized by relegation to D2 and an Algerian Cup final loss against USMA on penalties. This was despite the rich who provided a workforce for CRB, and this team was regarded as the best championship team on paper with the Yahi, Amani, Badache, Laamouri, Khoudja, Kabrane, Abdesamia, Kouhil, Demdoum, etc. On the ground though, things were otherwise. However, the ordeal lasted only a single season, as the club returned to the D1 the following year, in 1989.

But the event of relegation did not go without leaving deep scars in the heart of the CRB because Chabab flost its fame to occupy a role in successive championships, even avoiding relegation repeatedly until 1994. In fact, during this year, the Shabab, led by Mourad Abdelouahab was classed as 4th in the championship with the main aim of qualification for the Arabic Cup in Saudi Arabia. It was therefore the following year (1995) that the CRB took part in this competition, where they recorded a respectable run to the semi-final where they were defeated against Espérance de Tunis 0–1.

In 1995, the CRB won the Algerian Cup for the fifth time in its history against the O Medea 2–1.

This period marked a significant era for the club, characterized by the emergence of a new generation of players. Following changes in club leadership and coaching staff, including the departure of Lefkir Selmi and the return of Mourad replacing Abdelouahab Bacha-Adjaout, a reorganized squad was assembled featuring players such as Bekhti, Badji, Settara, Talis, Bounekdja, Selmi, Yacine Chedba, Ali Moussa, and Boutaleb, among others. The club pursued an attacking style of play, with management regularly recruiting new players to fulfill the tactical requirements of the coaching staff and meet sporting objectives. Among those who joined the club during this period were Mezouar and Boukessassa.

Players arrived during the 1999–2000 season, which saw Chabab win the title of Champion of Algeria for the 5th time in its history. This also included a victory in the league cup on 19 March 2000, against MC Oran (3–0).

The following season, and its momentum, Chabab not only confirms but does better with a title 2 row from 2000 to 2001 by capping JSK and USMA 7 days of the end of the championship. For the record, the Shabab had won 10 consecutive games with Nour Benzekri happened in the middle of the season.

=== The dark years ===
After this season, a sharp drop in the club's performance was observed, often attributed to the club's new policy. Despite this, the CRB still managed to reach the finals of the 2003 Algerian Cup Final, which resulted in a loss due to a decision considered by fans of the club scandalous in nature and in favour of USM Alger by the referee of the meeting (Berber). As a testament to the club's policy, 17 players from champions Algeria were released in 18 months. Given all this, fans of the club had lost hope about Chabab. Thus Chabab had their two most catastrophic seasons (after 1988), when the club narrowly escaped relegation to D2 twice; in (2003–2004 and 2004–2005). The 2005–2006 season was an average season, despite being backed by 16 players.

=== 2020–present: Consecutive Championships ===
CR Belouizdad were declared champions of the unfinished 2019–20 season which was halted in March 2020, due to the COVID-19 pandemic in Algeria. Later on, CR Belouizdad managed to win the following 2020–21 and 2021–22 and 2022-2023 to make record of 4 times champion in a row to become the first Algerian team to achieve it. In the CAF Champions League, CR Belouizdad reached the quarter-finals in the 2020–21 and 2021–22 and also in the 2022-2023 season but got knocked out from the group stages in 2023–2024 edition.

== Club identity ==
=== Colours ===
Since the establishment of the club, its colours have been white and red.

=== Crest ===
Historical evolution of the club's crest.

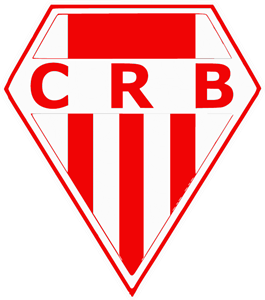
First badge of the club

== Honours ==
=== Domestic competitions ===
- Algerian Ligue Professionnelle 1
  - Winners (10): 1964–65, 1965–66, 1968–69, 1969–70, 1999–2000, 2000–01, 2019–20, 2020–21, 2021–22, 2022–23
  - Runners-up (4): 1971–72, 1976–77, 1979–80, 2023–24
- Algerian Cup
  - Winners (9): 1965–66, 1968–69, 1969–70, 1977–78, 1994–95, 2008–09, 2016–17, 2018–19, 2023–24
  - Runners-up (6): 1987–88, 2002–03, 2011–12, 2022–23, 2024–25, 2025–26
- Algerian League Cup
  - Winners (1): 1999–2000
- Algerian Super Cup
  - Winners (2): 1995, 2019

=== Regional competitions ===
- Maghreb Champions Cup
  - Winners (3): 1970, 1971, 1972
  - Runners-up: 1973

== Performance in CAF competitions ==
CR Belouizdad whose team has regularly taken part in Confederation of African Football (CAF) competitions. Qualification for Algerian clubs is determined by a team's performance in its domestic league and cup competitions, CR Belouizdad have regularly qualified for the primary African competition, the African Cup, by winning the Ligue Professionnelle 1. CR Belouizdad have also achieved African qualification via the Algerian Cup and have played in the former African Cup Winners' Cup. the first match was against ASC Jeanne d'Arc and ended in victory for CR Belouizdad 5–3 but in the second leg, CR Belouizdad did not move to Senegal for unknown reasons. As for the biggest win result was in 1996 against Horoya AC 5–2, and biggest loss was in 2001 against ASEC Mimosas 7–0, The best participation was in 1996 in the African Cup Winners' Cup, when the team reached the semi-finals and was eliminated against AC Sodigraf.

== Players ==
Algerian teams are limited to four foreign players. The squad list includes only the principal nationality of each player;

=== Current squad ===
As of 8 October 2026 Note: Flags indicate national team as defined under FIFA eligibility rules; some limited exceptions apply. Players may hold more than one non-FIFA nationality.

No.	Pos.	Nation	Player
1	GK	ALG	Tarek Bousseder
2	DF	ALG	Chouaib Keddad
3	DF	ALG	Houcine Benayada
4	DF	ALG	Riyane Akacem
5	MF	ALG	Abdelmalek Kelaleche
6	MF	ALG	Mehdi Boudjemaa
7	FW	CMR	Franck Etouga
8	MF	TUN	Houssem Tka
9	FW	ALG	Lofti Boussouar
10	FW	ALG	Farid El Melali
11	FW	ALG	Abderrahmane Meziane
12	FW	ALG	Kouceila Boualia
13	DF	ALG	Haithem Elkouacheur
14	MF	CGO	Julio Bandessi

No.	Pos.	Nation	Player
15	DF	ALG	Benahmed Bendahmane
16	GK	ALG	Anes Mokhtar
17	DF	ALG	Yasser Chelfaoui
18	MF	ALG	Salim Boukhanchouche
19	MF	ALG	Abdelaziz Kahia
20	FW	TUN	Mohamed Ali Ben Hammouda
21	DF	ALG	Youcef Laouafi
22	DF	ALG	Fouad Kermiche
23	DF	ALG	Sofiane Bouchar (captain)
26	FW	ALG	Yousri Bouzok
27	MF	ALG	Djaber Kaassis
29	MF	ALG	Bilal Boukerchaoui
30	GK	ALG	Farid Chaâl

== Personnel ==
=== Current technical staff ===
Position	Staff
Head coach	(Tunisia) Nabil Maâloul
Assistant coach	(Tunisia) Mohamed Ayari
Goalkeeping coach	(Algeria) Hakim Sebaa
Fitness coach	(Tunisia) Talel Bouaben

=== Management ===
Position	Staff
President	Mohamed Arar
General Director	
Sporting Director	Djabir Naâmoune
General Secretary	
Financial Director	

=== Club presidents ===
No	Name	From	To
1	(Algeria) Djelloul Boukida	1962	1967
2	(Algeria) Mohamed Kazza	1967	1972
3	(Algeria) Mohamed Bousmaha	1972	1977
4	(Algeria) Rachid Haraigue	1977	1992
5	(Algeria) Hamid Aït Igrine	1992	1994
6	(Algeria) Mohamed Lefkir	1994	1996
7	(Algeria) Djilali Selmi	1996	2000
8	(Algeria) Mohamed Lefkir	2000	2005
9	(Algeria) Yahia Hassani	2005	2006
10	(Algeria) Mokhtar Kalem	2006	2008
11	(Algeria) Mahfoud Kerbadj	2008	2010
12	(Algeria) Azzedine Gana	2010	2013
13	(Algeria) Réda Malek	2013	2016
14	(Algeria) Mohamed Bouhafs	2016	2018
15	(Algeria) Riad Boucetta	2018	2018
16	(Algeria) Charaf-Eddine Amara	2018	2021
17	(Algeria) Mohamed Abrouk	2021	2021
18	(Algeria) Mohamed Belhadj	2021	2023
19	(Algeria) Mehdi Rabehi	2023	2025
20	(Algeria) Badreddine Bahloul	2025	2026
21	(Algeria) Mohamed Arar	2026	Present

=== Notable players ===
Below are the notable former players who have represented CR Belouizdad in league and international competition since the club's foundation in 1962. To appear in the section below, a player must have played in at least 100 official matches for the club or represented the national team for which the player is eligible during his stint with CR Belouizdad or following his departure.

For a complete list of CR Belouizdad players, see Category:CR Belouizdad players

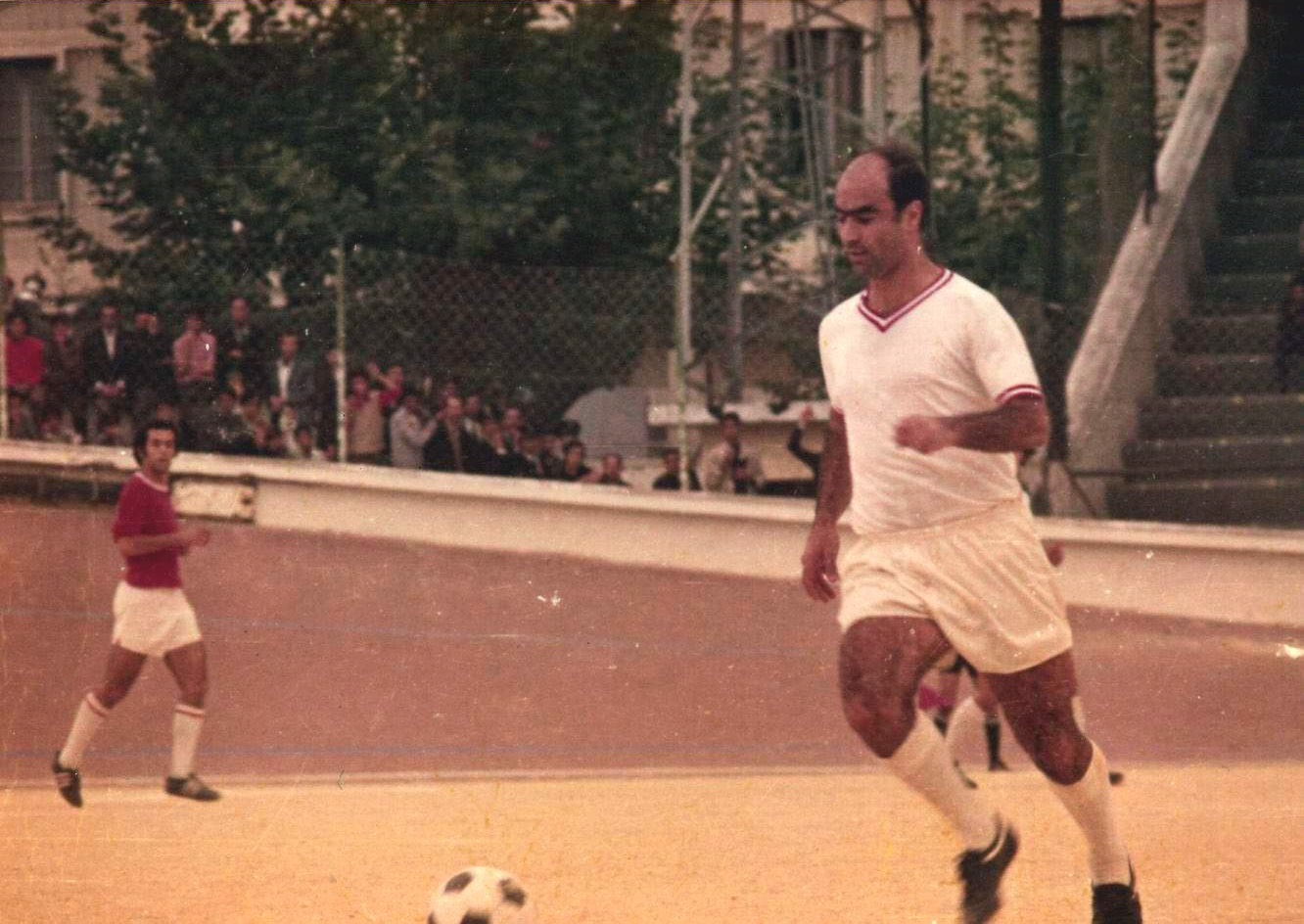
Hacène Lalmas

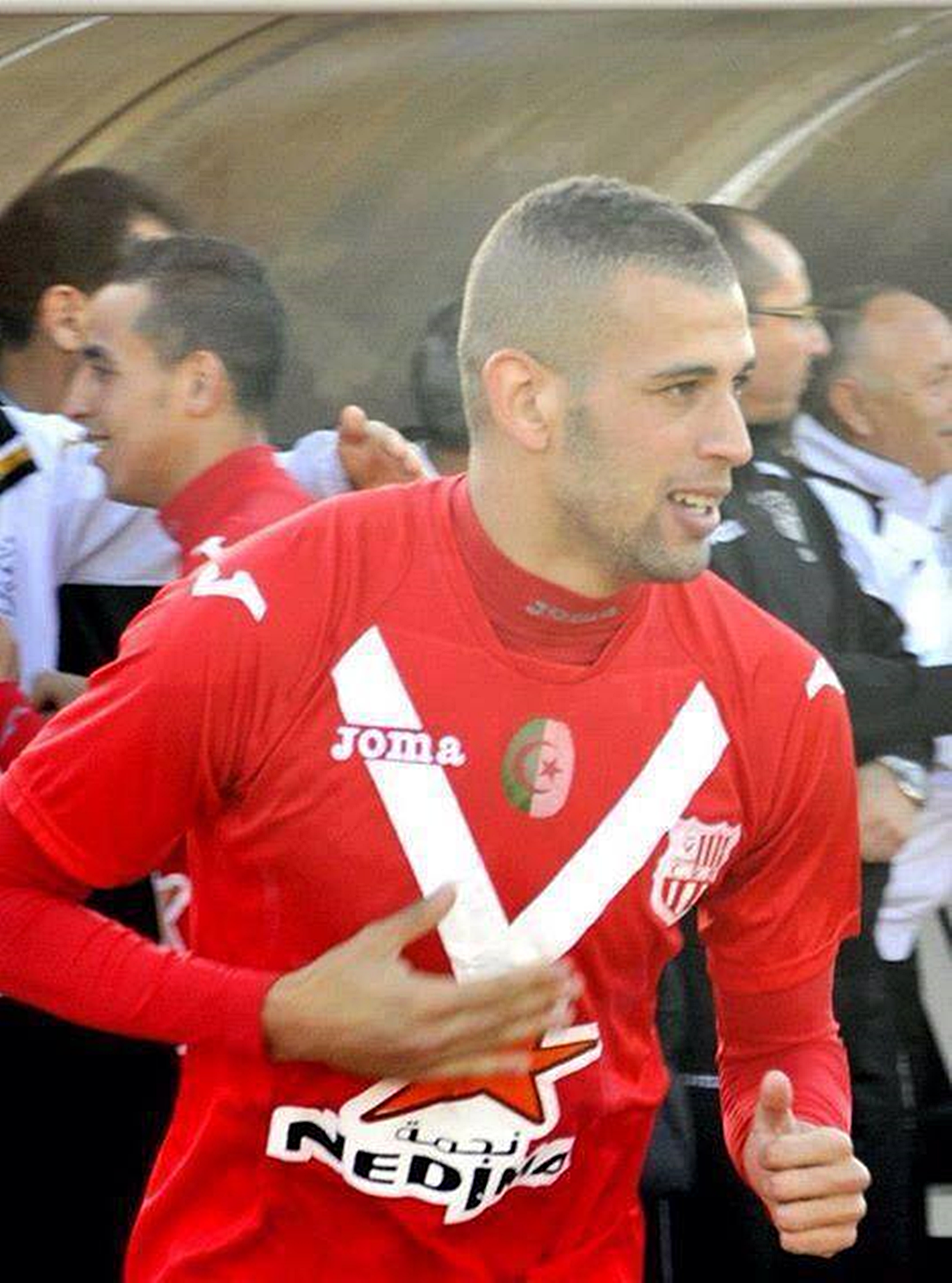
Islam Slimani

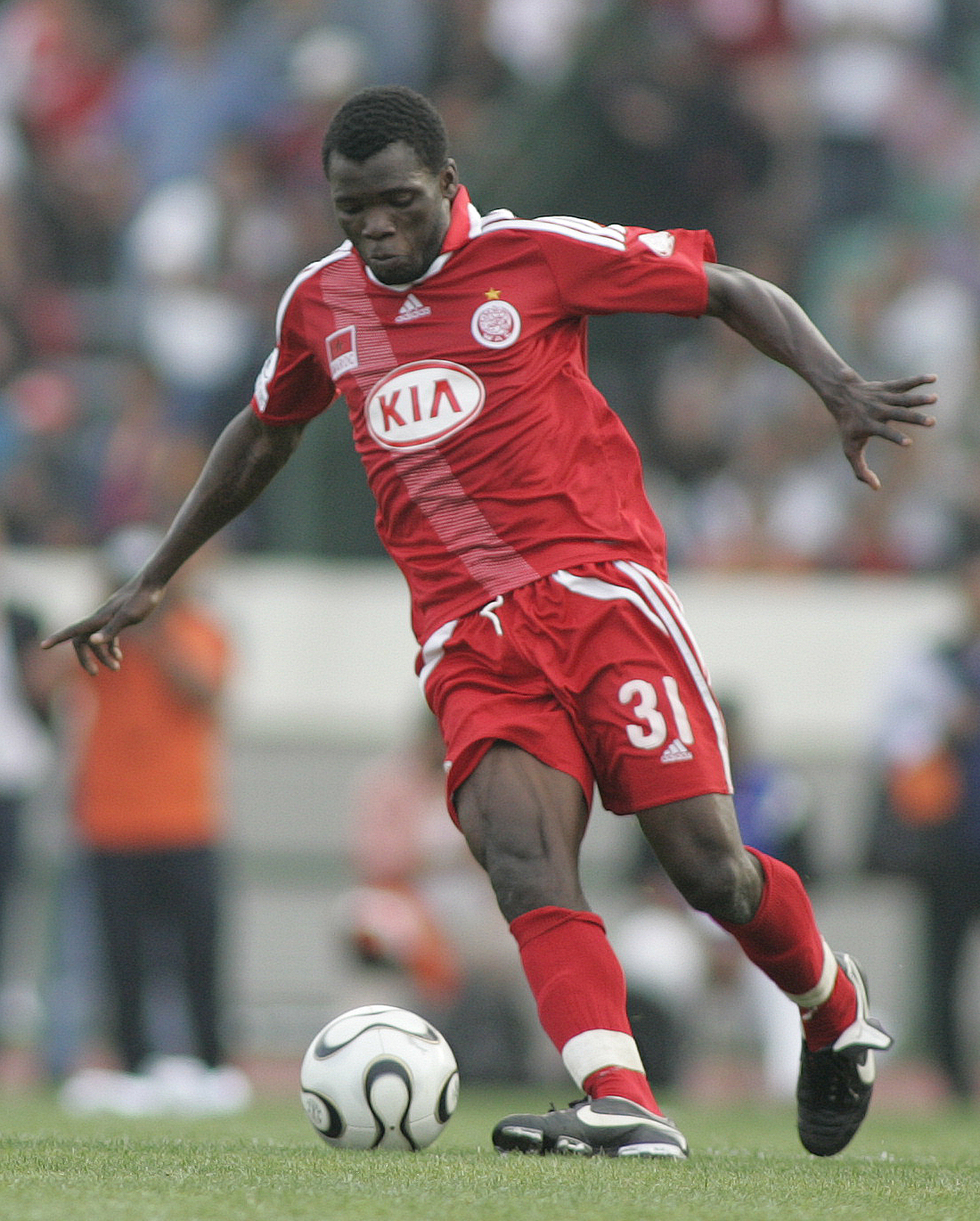
Pascal Angan

Algeria

- (Algeria) Mohamed Abrouk
- (Algeria) Ishak Ali Moussa
- (Algeria) Fayçal Badji
- (Algeria) Hocine Benmiloudi
- (Algeria) Nassim Bounekdja
- (Algeria) Mustapha Dahleb
- (Algeria) Bouazza Feham
- (Algeria) Samir Hadjaoui
- (Algeria) Salem Harcheche
- (Algeria) Mokhtar Khalem
- (Algeria) Mustapha Kouici
- (Algeria) Abdelkader Laïfaoui

Algeria

- (Algeria) Hacène Lalmas
- (Algeria) Kheïreddine Madoui
- (Algeria) Abdelkrim Mameri
- (Algeria) Djamel Menad
- (Algeria) Brahim Arafat Mezouar
- (Algeria) Noureddine Neggazi
- (Algeria) Mohamed Ousserir
- (Tunisia) Djilali Selmi
- (Algeria) Islam Slimani
- (Algeria) Mohamed Talis
- (Algeria) Djamel Tlemçani
- (Algeria) Hocine Yahi

Africa

- (Cameroon) Bruno Hameni Njeukam
- (Burkina Faso) Alain Nebié
- (Ivory Coast) Mouhoubé Alex Somian
- (Benin) Jean Louis Pascal Angan
- (Benin) Mohamed Aoudou Golanne
- (Cameroon) Gilles Ngomo Michée
- (Cameroon) François Obélé
- (Ghana) Sheriff Deen
- (Nigeria) Onome Sympson Sodje
- (Egypt) Bogy
- (Mali) Soumaila Sidibe
- (Guinea) Mohamed Thiam
- (Niger) Boubacar Soumana Hainikoye

Europe

- (Bosnia and Herzegovina) Miloš Galin

=== Managers list ===
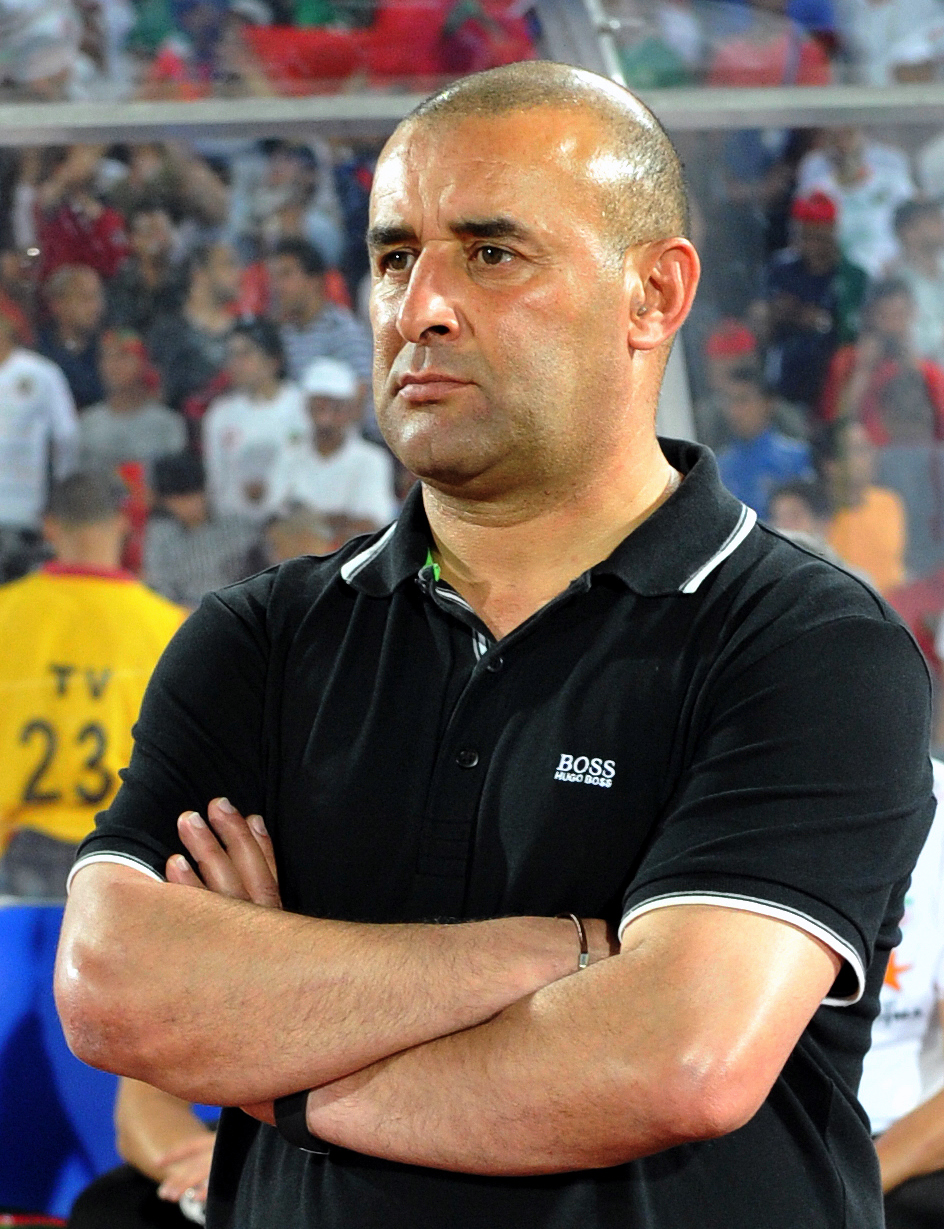
Abdelhak Benchikha

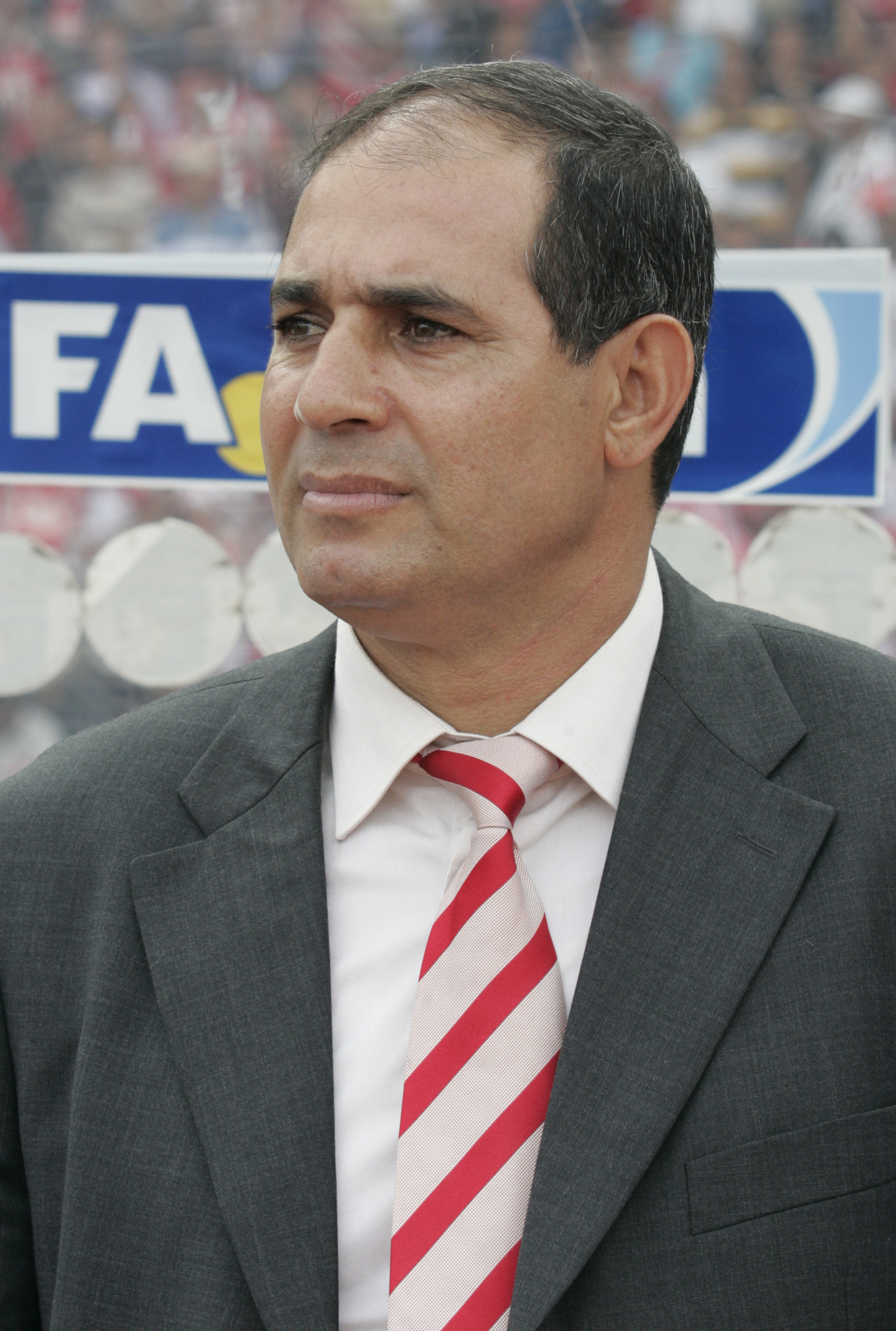
Badou Zaki

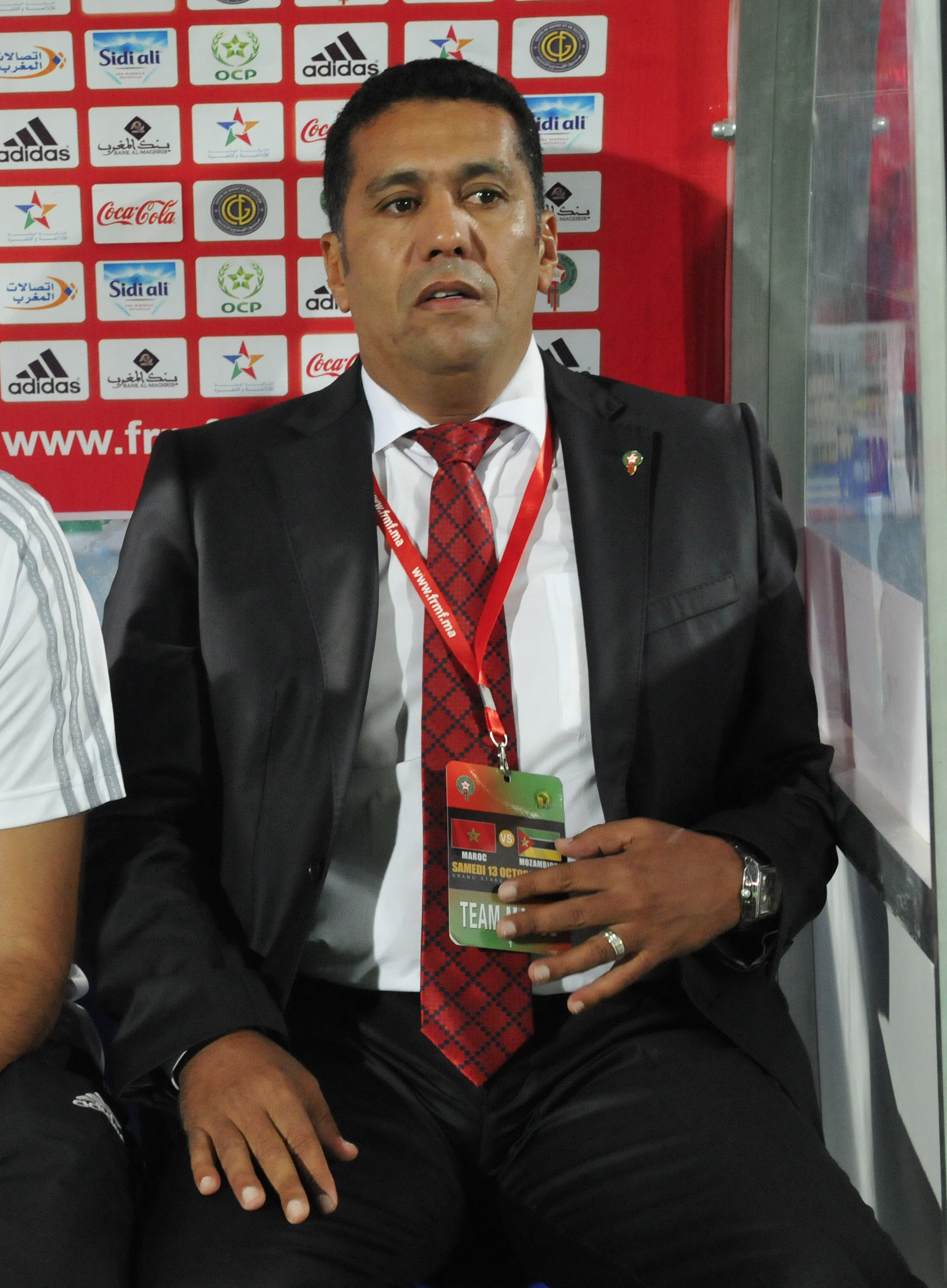
Rachid Taoussi

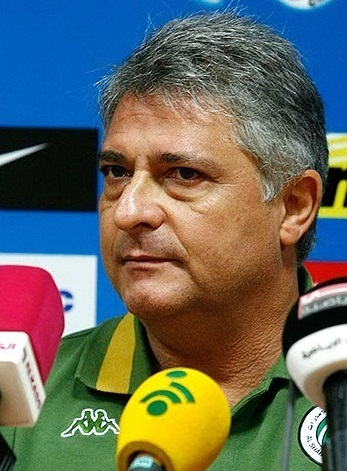
Marcos Paquetá

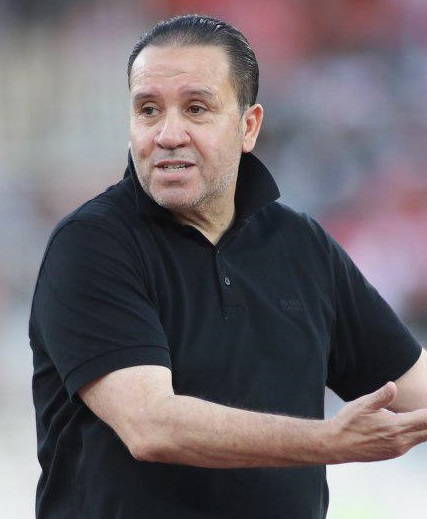
Nabil Maâloul

- (Algeria) Yahia Saadi (? – ?)
- (Algeria) Ahmed Zitoun (1 July 1964 – 30 June 1966)
- (Algeria) Ahmed Arab (1 July 1967 – 30 June 1969)
- (Algeria) Hacène Lalmas (1 July 1969 – 30 June 1970)
- (Algeria) Ali Benfadah (1 July 1973 – 30 June 1974)
- (Czechoslovakia) Dušan Uhrin (1 July 1977 – 30 June 1978)
- (Algeria) Ahmed Arab (1 July 1977 – 30 June 1978)
- ???
- (Algeria) Abdelhamid Bacha (? – ?)
- (Algeria) Mustapha Heddane (? – ?)
- (Algeria) Chérif Adjaout (? – ?)
- (Algeria) Mourad Abdelouahab (? – ?)
- (Algeria) Nour Benzekri (? – ?)
- (Algeria) Kamel Mouassa (1 July 2002 – 28 January 2003)
- (Algeria) Abdelhamid Bacha (29 January 2003 – 3 September 2003)
- (Algeria) Noureddine Neggazi (interim) (4 September 2003 – 18 September 2003)
- (Algeria) Abdelkader Soltani (19 September 2003 – 10 February 2004)
- (Algeria) Noureddine Neggazi (interim) (11 February 2004 – 3 March 2004)
- (Montenegro) Milisav Bogdanovic (4 March 2004 – 9 March 2004)
- (Algeria) Noureddine Neggazi (interim) (10 March 2004 – 18 May 2004)
- (Algeria) Djamel Amani (interim) (19 May 2004 – 30 June 2004)
- (Algeria) Mourad Abdelouahab (1 July 2004 – 23 October 2004)
- (Algeria) Djamel Amani (interim) (23 February 2005 – 3 March 2005)
- (Algeria) Azzedine Aït Djoudi (4 March 2005 – 31 May 2005)
- (Algeria) Abdelhak Benchikha (1 June 2005 – 30 June 2006)
- ???
- (Algeria) Mohamed Henkouche (1 July 2008 – 3 October 2009)
- (Algeria) Karim Bouhila (interim) (4 October 2009 – 24 December 2009)
- (Algeria) Mohamed Henkouche (25 December 2009 – 30 June 2010)
- (Argentina) Miguel Angel Gamondi (4 July 2010 – 30 June 2011)
- (Italy) Giovanni Solinas (1 July 2011 – 22 November 2011)
- (Algeria) Djamel Menad (23 November 2011 – 30 June 2012)
- (Italy) Guglielmo Arena (1 July 2012 – 23 October 2012)
- (Algeria) Fouad Bouali (3 November 2012 – 15 June 2013)
- (Argentina) Miguel Angel Gamondi (20 June 2013 – 1 January 2014)
- (Algeria) Abdelkader Yaïche (6 January 2014 – 23 February 2014)
- (Algeria) Mohamed Henkouche (24 February 2014 – 30 June 2014)
- (France) Victor Zvunka (1 July 2014 – 20 October 2014)
- (France) Alain Michel (29 October 2014 – 30 June 2016)
- (Algeria) Fouad Bouali (1 July 2016 – 29 August 2016)
- (France) Alain Michel (19 September 2016 – 24 October 2016)
- (Morocco) Ezzaki Badou (13 November 2016 – 7 July 2017)
- (Serbia) Ivica Todorov (21 July 2017 – 25 December 2017)
- (Morocco) Rachid Taoussi (28 December 2017 – 30 May 2018)
- (Algeria) Tahar Chérif El-Ouazzani (26 July 2018 – 7 October 2018)
- (Algeria) Lotfi Amrouche (interim) (8 October 2018 – 2 December 2018)
- (Algeria) Abdelkader Amrani (3 December 2018 – 28 December 2019)
- (France) Franck Dumas (13 January 2020 – 30 March 2021)
- (Serbia) Zoran Manojlović (20 April 2021 – 31 August 2021)
- (Brazil) Marcos Paquetá (23 September 2021 –26 June 2022)
- (Tunisia) Nabil Kouki (4 July 2022 –15 July 2023)
- (Belgium) Sven Vandenbroeck (19 July 2023 –8 October 2023)
- (Brazil) Marcos Paquetá (15 October 2023 –5 July 2024)
- (France) Corentin Martins (16 July 2024 –16 October 2024)
- (Algeria) Abdelkader Amrani (16 October 2024 –24 January 2025)
- (Germany) Sead Ramović (5 February 2025 –20 April 2026)
- (Tunisia) Nabil Maâloul (2 July 2026 –)
