= 2010–11 JS Kabylie season =

JS Kabylie
2010–11 season
- President: Mohand Chérif Hannachi
- Head Coach: Alain Geiger (until 14 December 2010); Rachid Belhout (from 23 December 2010) (until 26 June 2011); Moussa Saïb (from 27 June 2011)
- Stadium: Stade du 1^{er} Novembre 1954
- Ligue 1: 11th
- Algerian Cup: Winners
- Champions League: Semi-finals
- Confederation Cup: Play-off round
- Top goalscorer: League: Farès Hamiti (6 goals); All: Farès Hamiti (13 goals)
Home colours	Away colours

The 2010–11 season was JS Kabylie's 41st season in the Algerian Ligue Professionnelle 1. They competed in Ligue 1, the 2010 CAF Champions League and the Algerian Cup.

== Squad list ==
Players and squad numbers last updated on 18 November 2010.
Note: Flags indicate national team as has been defined under FIFA eligibility rules. Players may hold more than one non-FIFA nationality.

No.	Nat.	Position	Name	Date of Birth (Age)	Signed from
Goalkeepers
12	(Algeria)	GK	Nabil Mazari	18 February 1984 (aged 26)	(Algeria) Youth system
13	(Algeria)	GK	Mourad Berrefane	18 March 1986 (aged 24)	(Algeria) Youth system
1	(Algeria)	GK	Malik Asselah	8 July 1986 (aged 24)	(Algeria) NA Hussein Dey
Defenders
2	(Algeria)	RB	Belkacem Remache	12 October 1985 (aged 25)	(Algeria) USM Annaba
4	(Algeria)	LB	Chemseddine Nessakh	4 January 1988 (aged 22)	(Algeria) ASM Oran
5	(Algeria)	CB	Ali Rial	26 March 1980 (aged 30)	(Algeria) USM Alger
16	(Algeria)	RB	Jugurtha Meftah	28 July 1990 (aged 20)	(Algeria) Youth system
21	(Algeria)	CB	Koceila Berchiche	5 August 1985 (aged 25)	(Algeria) RC Kouba
24	(Algeria)	LB	Nassim Oussalah	8 October 1981 (aged 29)	(Algeria) MO Béjaïa
31	(Mali)	CB	Idrissa Coulibaly	19 December 1987 (aged 23)	(Mali) Centre Salif Keita
33	(Algeria)	RB	Mohamed Khoutir Ziti	19 April 1989 (aged 21)	(Algeria) ES Setif
36	(Algeria)	CB	Essaïd Belkalem	1 January 1989 (aged 22)	(Algeria) Youth system
Midfielders
6	(Algeria)	DM	Hocine El Orfi	27 January 1987 (aged 23)	(Algeria) Paradou AC
8	(Algeria)	RM	Saad Tedjar	14 January 1986 (aged 24)	(Algeria) Paradou AC
14	(Algeria)	MF	Abdennour Chérif El-Ouazzani	18 March 1986 (aged 24)	(Algeria) MC Oran
18	(Algeria)	DM	Lamara Douicher	10 March 1980 (aged 30)	(Algeria) Youth system
20	(Algeria)	DM	Lyès Saïdi	24 August 1987 (aged 23)	(Algeria) ORB Akbou
26	(Algeria)	AM	Billel Naïli	15 June 1986 (aged 24)	(Algeria) USM El Harrach
23	(Algeria)	DM	Mokhtar Lamhene	18 January 1990 (aged 20)	(Algeria) Youth system
30	(Algeria)	LM	Nabil Yaâlaoui	1 May 1987 (aged 23)	(Algeria) WA Tlemcen
Forwards
7	(Algeria)	RW	Sid Ali Yahia-Chérif	4 January 1985 (aged 25)	(Algeria) RC Kouba
9	(Algeria)	FW	Farès Hamiti	26 June 1987 (aged 23)	(Algeria) USM Blida
10	(Algeria)	FW	Sofiane Younes	22 May 1985 (aged 25)	(Algeria) CR Belouizdad
15	(Algeria)	FW	Mohamed Amine Aoudia	6 June 1987 (aged 23)	(Algeria) USM Annaba
35	(Nigeria)	FW	Izu Azuka	24 May 1989 (aged 21)	(Nigeria) Sharks

== Manager ==
Swiss manager Alain Geiger began the season as the manager, continuing in his position from the previous season, after leading the team to an impressive record over the summer in the group stage of the 2010 CAF Champions League with 4 wins and 2 draws. However, after losing in the semi-finals of the Champions League to TP Mazembe of DR Congo and a string of bad results in the league, he resigned from his position on December 13, 2010, with JS Kabylie sitting in 8th position in the standings. On December 22, 2010, Rachid Belhout was appointed manager of the team.

=== Managerial changes ===
Outgoing manager	Manner of departure	Date of vacancy	Table	Incoming manager	Date of appointment	Table
(Switzerland) Alain Geiger	Resigned	13 December 2010	8th	(Algeria) Rachid Belhout	22 December 2010	
(Algeria) Rachid Belhout	Resigned	26 June 2011		(Algeria) Moussa Saïb	27 June 2011	

== Pre-season and friendlies ==
23 July 2010	GS Consolat (France)	0–2	JS Kabylie	Aix-en-Provence
			Yahia-Chérif 39'; Saidi 53'	Stadium: CREPS

24 July 2010	FC Istres (France)	2–0	JS Kabylie	Istres
19:00 UTC+2				Stadium: Stade Parsemain

21 August 2010	Olympique de Médéa	0–1	JS Kabylie	Médéa
22:00		Report	Younès 33'	Stadium: Stade OPOW de Médéa

23 August 2010	JS Kabylie	5–0	NARB Réghaïa	Tizi Ouzou
22:00	El Orfi 2'; Azuka 15'; Tedjar 29'; Younès 72' (pen.); Khoutir-Ziti 84'	Report		Stadium: Stade du 1 Novembre 1954

4 September 2010	JS Kabylie	3–0	Olympique de Médéa	Tizi Ouzou
	Belkalem; Yaâlaoui,			Stadium: Stade du 1 Novembre 1954; Attendance: 9,000

== Competitions ==
=== Overview ===
Competition	Record								Started round	Final position / round	First match	Last match
Competition	G	W	D	L	GF	GA	GD	Win %	Started round	Final position / round	First match	Last match
Ligue 1	30	10	7	13	26	37	−11	33.33	—N/a	11th	25 September 2010	8 July 2011
Algerian Cup	6	6	0	0	12	4	+8	100.00	Round of 64	Winner	29 December 2010	1 May 2011
Champions League	8	4	3	1	7	5	+2	50.00	Group stage	Semi-finals	18 July 2010	17 October 2010
Confederation Cup	6	4	1	1	9	5	+4	66.67	First round	Play-off round	20 March 2011	10 June 2011
Total	50	24	11	15	54	51	+3	48.00				

Updated to match played 3 June 2019
Source: Competitions

=== Ligue 1 ===
==== League table ====
Pos	Team	Pld	W	D	L	GF	GA	GD	Pts
9	USM Alger	30	9	11	10	32	28	+4	38
10	MC Alger	30	8	13	9	30	28	+2	37
11	JS Kabylie	30	10	7	13	26	37	−11	37
12	WA Tlemcen	30	10	7	13	35	36	−1	37
13	MC El Eulma	30	9	9	12	32	40	−8	36

Updated to match(es) played on 19 April 2018. Source: DZFoot
Rules for classification: 1) points; 2) head-to-head points; 3) head-to-head goal difference; 4) goal difference; 5) total goals; 6) fairplay ranking; 7) playoff.

==== Results summary ====
Overall								Home						Away					
Pld	W	D	L	GF	GA	GD	Pts	W	D	L	GF	GA	GD	W	D	L	GF	GA	GD
30	10	7	13	26	37	−11	37	9	5	1	17	7	+10	1	2	12	9	30	−21

Last updated: 22 April 2018.
Source: Competitive matches

==== Results by round ====
Round	1	2	3	4	5	6	7	8	9	10	11	12	13	14	15	16	17	18	19	20	21	22	23	24	25	26	27	28	29	30
Ground	H	A	H	A	H	A	H	A	H	A	H	A	H	H	A	A	H	A	H	A	H	A	H	A	H	A	H	A	A	H
Result	W	D	D	W	D	L	W	L	W	L	D	L	W	W	D	L	W	L	W	L	W	L	W	L	D	L	L	L	L	D
Position																														11

Source: Competitive matches
A = Away; H = Home; W = Win; D = Draw; L = Loss

=== Matches ===
Win Draw Loss

25 September 2010 Round 1	JS Kabylie	3–2	AS Khroub	Tizi Ouzou
17:00	Aoudia 17'; Yaâlaoui 41' (pen.); Nessakh 84'	Soccerway report	Ngomo 39'; Boutnaf 83'	Stadium: Stade 1er Novembre 1954; Referee: Abdelkader Karabi

2 November 2010 Round 2	MC Oran	0–0	JS Kabylie	Oran
14:30		Soccerway report		Stadium: Ahmed Zabana Stadium; Referee: Redouane Necib

23 November 2010 Round 3	JS Kabylie	1–1	CR Belouizdad	Tizi Ouzou
14:30	Aoudia 47'	Soccerway report	Bourakba 72'	Stadium: Stade 1er Novembre 1954; Referee: Mehdi Abid Charef

22 October 2010 Round 4	CA Bordj Bou Arreridj	0–2	JS Kabylie	Bordj Bou Arréridj
20:00		Soccerway report	Younès 72' (pen.); Tedjar 80'	Stadium: Stade 20 Août 1955; Referee: Mohamed Bouhenni

26 October 2010 Round 5	JS Kabylie	0–0	ASO Chlef	Tizi Ouzou
17:00		Soccerway report		Stadium: Stade 1er Novembre 1954; Referee: Sofiane Bousseter

29 October 2010 Round 6	JSM Béjaïa	4–2	JS Kabylie	Béjaïa
16:00	Meftah 34'; Rial 45' (o.g.); Bouraba 62'; Maïza 82'	Soccerway report	Hamiti 40' (pen.), 58'	Stadium: Stade de l'Unité Maghrébine; Referee: Djamel Haimoudi

6 November 2010 Round 7	JS Kabylie	1–0	USM Annaba	Tizi Ouzou
14:30	Aoudia 15' (pen.)	Soccerway report		Stadium: Stade 1er Novembre 1954; Referee: Kadda Babrahim

13 November 2010 Round 8	USM El Harrach	1–0	JS Kabylie	Algiers
14:30	Boualem 23'	Soccerway report		Stadium: Stade 1er Novembre 1954; Referee: Farid Bahloul

27 November 2010 Round 9	JS Kabylie	3–0	WA Tlemcen	Tizi Ouzou
14:30	Tedjar 27'; Aoudia 52', 57' (pen.)	Soccerway report		Stadium: Stade 1er Novembre 1954; Referee: Mohamed Haddada

3 December 2010 Round 10	MC Saïda	1–0	JS Kabylie	Saïda
15:00	Hadiouche 54'	Soccerway report		Stadium: Stade 13 Avril 1958; Referee: Redouane Necib

4 January 2011 Round 11	JS Kabylie	1–1	ES Sétif	Tizi Ouzou
14:30	Yaâlaoui 69'	Soccerway report	Metref 90'	Stadium: Stade 1er Novembre 1954; Referee: Mohamed Bichari

18 December 2010 Round 12	USM Blida	1–0	JS Kabylie	Blida
14:30	Mokhtar 6'	Soccerway report		Stadium: Mustapha Tchaker Stadium; Referee: Mohamed Bouhenni

25 December 2010 Round 13	JS Kabylie	1–0	USM Alger	Tizi Ouzou
14:30	Rial 5'	Soccerway report		Stadium: Stade 1er Novembre 1954; Referee: Kadda Babrahim

19 February 2011 Round 14	JS Kabylie	3–2	MC El Eulma	Tizi Ouzou
14:30	Hamiti 9'; Rial 52'; Younès 73'	Soccerway report	Benamokrane 51'; Boulemdaïs 56'	Stadium: Stade 1er Novembre 1954; Referee: Redouane Necib

26 February 2011 Round 15	MC Alger	1–1	JS Kabylie	Rouïba
14:30	Boudebouda 1'	Soccerway report	Hamiti 77'	Stadium: Stade Mabrouki Salem; Referee: Sofiane Bousseter

10 May 2011 Round 16	AS Khroub	1–0	JS Kabylie	El Khroub
17:00	Ngomo 56'	Soccerway report		Stadium: Stade Abed Hamdani; Referee: Farouk Houasnia

29 March 2011 Round 17	JS Kabylie	1–0	MC Oran	Tizi Ouzou
15:30	Hamiti 51'	Soccerway report		Stadium: Stade 1er Novembre 1954; Referee: Mohamed Babou

17 May 2011 Round 18	CR Belouizdad	7–1	JS Kabylie	Belouizdad
17:00	Abdat 3'; Slimani 20', 24', 49', 69'; Rebih 40' (pen.); Saïbi 90+2' (pen.)	Soccerway report	Tedjar 34' (pen.)	Stadium: Stade 20 Août 1955; Referee: Mohamed Haddada

13 April 2011 Round 19	JS Kabylie	1–0	CA Bordj Bou Arreridj	Tizi Ouzou
17:00	Nessakh 82'	Soccerway report		Stadium: Stade 1er Novembre 1954; Referee: Mokhtar Amalou

24 May 2011 Round 20	ASO Chlef	3–0	JS Kabylie	Chlef
20:00	Ali Hadji 31' (pen.); Seguer 42'; Biyaga 54'	Soccerway report		Stadium: Stade Mohamed Boumezrag; Referee: Rafik Achouri

6 June 2011 Round 21	JS Kabylie	1–0	JSM Béjaïa	Tizi Ouzou
19:00	Nessakh 43'	Soccerway report		Stadium: Stade 1er Novembre 1954; Attendance: 0 (close doors); Referee: Mohamed Babou

14 May 2011 Round 22	USM Annaba	2–1	JS Kabylie	Annaba
17:00	Ammari 51'; Boukhlouf 58'	Soccerway report	Nessakh 69'	Stadium: Stade 19 Mai 1956; Referee: Mohamed Sahraoui

21 May 2011 Round 23	JS Kabylie	1–0	USM El Harrach	Tizi Ouzou
17:00	Hamiti 26'	Soccerway report		Stadium: Stade 1er Novembre 1954; Referee: Mokhtar Amalou

14 June 2011 Round 24	WA Tlemcen	2–1	JS Kabylie	Tlemcen
18:00	Mebarki 3'; Andria 76'	Soccerway report	Nessakh 50'	Stadium: Stade Akid Lotfi; Referee: Boubekeur Zouaoui

18 June 2011 Round 25	JS Kabylie	0–0	MC Saïda	Tizi Ouzou
20:00		Soccerway report		Stadium: Stade 1er Novembre 1954; Referee: Farouk Houasnia

21 June 2011 Round 26	ES Sétif	2–0	JS Kabylie	Sétif
20:00	Hemani 24', 90+3'	Soccerway report		Stadium: Stade 8 Mai 1945; Referee: Youssef Zerrouki

25 June 2011 Round 27	JS Kabylie	0–1	USM Blida	Tizi Ouzou
18:00		Soccerway report	Belkheir 69'	Stadium: Stade 1er Novembre 1954; Referee: Mehdi Abid Charef

28 June 2011 Round 28	USM Alger	3–1	JS Kabylie	Bologhine
17:00	Ouznadji 11', 12'; Meklouche 84'	Soccerway report	10' Yalaoui	Stadium: Omar Hamadi Stadium; Referee: Farid Bahloul

1 July 2011 Round 29	MC El Eulma	2–0	JS Kabylie	El Eulma
18:00	Boulemdaïs 17', 45+2'	Soccerway report		Stadium: Stade Messaoud Zougar; Referee: Bouaza Chenane

8 July 2011 Round 30	JS Kabylie	0–0	MC Alger	Tizi Ouzou
18:00		Soccerway report		Stadium: Stade 1er Novembre 1954; Referee: Rafik Achouri

== Algerian Cup ==
31 December 2010 Round of 64	JS Kabylie	2–0	IRB Sedrata	Tizi Ouzou
14:15	Tedjar 20'; Berchiche 55'	Report		Stadium: Stade 1er Novembre 1954; Referee: Hamrani, Kastali, Gourine

4 March 2011 Round of 32	ES Mostaganem	0–1	JS Kabylie	Mostaganem
15:00		Report	Yahia-Chérif 39'	Stadium: Stade Mohamed Bensaïd; Referee: Babou, Schamby, Bouzaghou

15 March 2011 Round of 16	JS Kabylie	2–1 (a.e.t.)	MC El Eulma	Tizi Ouzou
14:30	Hamiti 45', 91'	Report	Benamokrane 34'	Stadium: Stade 1er Novembre 1954; Referee: Mohamed Sahraoui

9 April 2011 Quarter-finals	JS Kabylie	4–2	CR Belouizdad	Tizi Ouzou
15:00	Hamiti 15', 43'; Tedjar 50' (pen.); Younès 77'	Report	Saïbi 40'; Slimani 86'	Stadium: Stade 1er Novembre 1954; Referee: Mehdi Abid Charef

18 April 2011 Semi-finals	JS Kabylie	2–1	MC Oran	Tizi Ouzou
18:00	Khelili 8'; Hamiti 83'	Report	Berradja 22'	Stadium: Stade 1er Novembre 1954; Referee: Mohamed Bichari

1 May 2011 Final	USM El Harrach	0–1	JS Kabylie	Algiers
16:00		Report	Hamiti 12'	Stadium: Stade 5 Juillet 1962; Attendance: 60,000; Referee: Mehdi Abid Charef

== Champions League ==
=== Group stage ===
==== Group B ====
Pos	Team	Pld	W	D	L	GF	GA	GD	Pts	Qualification
1	(Algeria) JS Kabylie	6	4	2	0	6	2	+4	14	Advance to knockout stage
2	(Egypt) Al Ahly	6	2	2	2	8	9	−1	8	Advance to knockout stage
3	(Egypt) Ismaily	6	2	0	4	7	8	−1	6	
4	(Nigeria) Heartland	6	1	2	3	5	7	−2	5	

18 July 2010 Matchday 1	Ismaily (Egypt)	0–1	(Algeria) JS Kabylie	Ismailia
20:00 UTC+3		Report	Belkalem 75'	Stadium: Ismailia Stadium; Referee: Noumandiez Doue (Ivory Coast)

31 July 2010 Matchday 2	JS Kabylie (Algeria)	1–0	(Nigeria) Heartland	Tizi Ouzou
21:00 UTC+1	Hamiti 55'	Report		Stadium: Stade 1er Novembre; Referee: Muhmed Ssegonga (Uganda)

15 August 2010 Matchday 3	JS Kabylie (Algeria)	1–0	(Egypt) Al-Ahly	Tizi Ouzou
22:00 UTC+1	Khoutir-Ziti 25'	Report		Stadium: Stade 1er Novembre; Referee: Kokou Djaoupe (Togo)

29 August 2010 Matchday 4	Al-Ahly (Egypt)	1–1	(Algeria) JS Kabylie	Cairo
21:30 UTC+2	Nagy 22'	Report	Tedjar 29'	Stadium: Cairo Stadium; Referee: Kaoma Wellington (Zambia)

10 September 2010 Matchday 5	JS Kabylie (Algeria)	1–0	(Egypt) Ismaily	Tizi Ouzou
22:00 UTC+1	Azuka 87'	Report		Stadium: Stade 1er Novembre; Referee: Adel El Raay (Libya)

19 September 2010 Matchday 6	Heartland (Nigeria)	1–1	(Algeria) JS Kabylie	Owerri
16:00 UTC+1	Nwanna 32'		Yaâlaoui 50'	Stadium: Dan Anyiam Stadium; Referee: Daniel Bennett (South Africa)

==== Semi-finals ====
3 October 2010	TP Mazembe (Democratic Republic of the Congo)	3–1	(Algeria) JS Kabylie	Lubumbashi
15:30 UTC+2	Kaluyituka 6', 89'; Kasongo 85'		Yaâlaoui 69'	Stadium: Stade de la Kenya

17 October 2010	JS Kabylie (Algeria)	0–0	(Democratic Republic of the Congo) TP Mazembe	Tizi Ouzou
				Stadium: Stade 1er Novembre

== CAF Confederation Cup ==
=== First round ===
20 March 2011	JS Kabylie (Algeria)	1–0	(Mauritania) ASC Tevragh-Zeïna	Tizi Ouzou
16:00 UTC+1	Nessakh 26'	Report		Stadium: Stade 1er Novembre

2 April 2011	ASC Tevragh-Zeïna (Mauritania)	1–2	(Algeria) JS Kabylie	Nouakchott
16:00 UTC+0	Ould Mokhtar 65' (pen.)	Report	Nessakh 33', 58'	Stadium: Stade Olympique

=== Second round ===
23 April 3011	Missile FC (Gabon)	3–0	(Algeria) JS Kabylie	Libreville
15:00 UTC+1	Essono 47'; Mintsa 60'; Dany-Karl 81'	Report		Stadium: Stade Augustin Monédan de Sibang

6 May 2011	JS Kabylie (Algeria)	3–0	(Gabon) Missile FC	Tizi Ouzou
18:00 UTC+0	Tedjar 16' (pen.), 35'; Yahia-Chérif 65'	Report		Stadium: Stade 1er Novembre

=== Play-off for group stage ===
28 May 2011	ASC Diaraf (Senegal)	1–1	(Algeria) JS Kabylie	Dakar
17:00 UTC+0	Ndiour 57'	Report	Yaâlaoui 52'	Stadium: Stade Demba Diop

10 June 2011	JS Kabylie (Algeria)	2–0	(Senegal) ASC Diaraf	Tizi Ouzou
18:00 UTC+1	Nessakh 81'; Tedjar 90+4'	Report		Stadium: Stade 1er Novembre

== Squad information ==
=== Playing statistics ===
No.	Pos	Nat	Player	Total		Ligue 1		Algerian Cup		Champions League		Confederation Cup	
No.	Pos	Nat	Player	Apps	Goals	Apps	Goals	Apps	Goals	Apps	Goals	Apps	Goals
13	GK	(Algeria) ALG	Mourad Berrefane	25	0	19	0	4	0	2	0	0	0
1	GK	(Algeria) ALG	Malik Asselah	22	0	9	0	1	0	6	0	6	0
12	GK	(Algeria) ALG	Nabil Mazari	3	0	2	0	1	0	0	0	0	0
5	DF	(Algeria) ALG	Ali Rial	43	5	24	2	6	0	7	0	6	3
4	DF	(Algeria) ALG	Chemseddine Nessakh	44	8	25	5	6	0	8	0	5	3
33	DF	(Algeria) ALG	Mohamed Khoutir-Ziti	23	1	12	0	2	0	5	1	4	0
21	DF	(Algeria) ALG	Koceila Berchiche	26	1	16	0	3	1	3	0	4	0
24	DF	(Algeria) ALG	Nassim Oussalah	39	0	24	0	4	0	7	0	4	0
27	DF	(Algeria) ALG	Essaïd Belkalem	19	1	12	0	0	0	7	1	0	0
28	DF	(Algeria) ALG	Belkacem Remache	42	0	25	0	5	0	6	0	6	0
20	DF	(Algeria) ALG	Lyès Saïdi	18	0	10	0	4	0	0	0	4	0
	DF	(Algeria) ALG	Sofiane Khelili	15	1	10	0	5	1	0	0	0	0
	DF	(Algeria) ALG	Rabah Yassa	2	0	2	0	0	0	0	0	0	0
2	MF	(Algeria) ALG	Billel Naïli	34	0	22	0	2	0	7	0	3	0
8	MF	(Algeria) ALG	Saad Tedjar	40	7	22	3	6	2	7	1	5	1
18	MF	(Algeria) ALG	Lamara Douicher	37	0	19	0	6	0	7	0	5	0
26	MF	(Algeria) ALG	Hocine El Orfi	34	0	21	0	4	0	4	0	5	0
29	MF	(Algeria) ALG	Nabil Yaâlaoui	32	6	20	3	1	0	5	2	6	1
25	MF	(Madagascar) MAD	Ibrahim Amada	14	0	11	0	3	0	0	0	0	0
16	MF	(Algeria) ALG	Jugurtha Meftah	2	0	2	0	0	0	0	0	0	0
29	MF	(Algeria) ALG	Chaâbane Meftah	3	0	3	0	0	0	0	0	0	0
7	FW	(Algeria) ALG	Sid Ali Yahia-Chérif	30	2	14	0	5	1	6	0	5	1
9	FW	(Algeria) ALG	Farès Hamiti	33	13	25	6	5	6	3	1	0	0
10	FW	(Algeria) ALG	Sofiane Younès	35	3	23	2	6	1	0	0	6	0
23	FW	(Algeria) ALG	Mokhtar Lamhene	25	0	17	0	3	0	0	0	5	0
28	MF	(Algeria) ALG	Saïd Ferguène	1	0	1	0	0	0	0	0	0	0
Players transferred out during the season
17	DF	(Mali) MLI	Idrissa Coulibaly	12	0	4	0	0	0	8	0	0	0
14	MF	(Algeria) ALG	Abdennour Cherif El Ouazzani	4	0	0	0	1	0	3	0	0	0
	FW	(Nigeria) NGR	Izu Azuka	8	1	4	0	0	0	4	1	0	0
15	FW	(Algeria) ALG	Mohamed Amine Aoudia	15	5	8	5	0	0	7	0	0	0

Last updated: 19 November 2017
Source: fr.soccerway.com

=== Goalscorers ===
Includes all competitive matches. The list is sorted alphabetically by surname when total goals are equal.

No.	Nat.	Player	Pos.	L 1	AC	CL 1	CC 3	TOTAL
9	(Algeria)	Farès Hamiti	FW	6	6	1	0	13
4	(Algeria)	Chemseddine Nessakh	DF	5	0	0	3	8
8	(Algeria)	Saad Tedjar	MF	3	2	1	1	7
29	(Algeria)	Nabil Yaâlaoui	MF	3	0	2	1	6
5	(Algeria)	Ali Rial	DF	2	0	0	3	5
15	(Algeria)	Mohamed Amine Aoudia	FW	5	0	0	0	5
10	(Algeria)	Sofiane Younès	FW	2	1	0	0	3
7	(Algeria)	Sid Ali Yahia-Chérif	FW	0	1	0	1	2
	(Nigeria)	Izu Azuka	FW	0	0	1	0	1
33	(Algeria)	Mohamed Khoutir-Ziti	DF	0	0	1	0	1
21	(Algeria)	Koceila Berchiche	DF	0	1	0	0	1
27	(Algeria)	Essaïd Belkalem	DF	0	0	1	0	1
	(Algeria)	Sofiane Khelili	DF	0	1	0	0	1
Own Goals				0	0	0	0	0
Totals				26	12	7	9	54

== Transfers ==
=== In ===
Date	Pos	Player	from club	Transfer fee	Source
3 June 2010	GK	(Algeria) Malik Asselah	NA Hussein Dey	Free transfer	
4 June 2010	MF	(Algeria) Hocine El Orfi	Paradou AC	Season loan	
6 June 2010	MF	(Algeria) Nabil Yaâlaoui	WA Tlemcen	Free transfer	
13 June 2010	DF	(Algeria) (France) Yamin Amiri	(France) SO Cassis Carnoux	Free transfer	
15 June 2010	MF	(Algeria) (France) Djaïd Kasri	Unattached	Free transfer	
17 June 2010	DF	(Algeria) Ali Rial	USM Alger	Free transfer	
11 July 2010	MF	(Algeria) Billel Naïli	USM El Harrach	Free transfer	
12 July 2010	DF	(Algeria) Belkacem Remache	USM Annaba	Free transfer	
23 July 2010	FW	(Algeria) Sofiane Younès	CR Belouizdad	Free transfer	
22 January 2011	DF	(Algeria) Sofiane Khelili	NA Hussein Dey	DA6 million	
30 January 2011	MF	(Algeria) Choukri Ouaïl	JSM Chéraga	DA1 million	
1 February 2011	FW	(Madagascar) Ibrahim Amada	(Madagascar) Academie Ny Antsika	Free transfer	

=== Out ===
Date	Pos	Player	to club	Transfer fee	Source
4 June 2010	GK	(Algeria) Samir Hadjaoui	WA Tlemcen	Free transfer	
20 June 2010	DF	(Algeria) Mohamed Rabie Meftah	JSM Béjaïa	Free transfer	
24 June 2010	MF	(Algeria) Tayeb Maroci	JSM Béjaïa	Free transfer	
30 June 2010	DF	(Algeria) Mohamed Ouslam Benhocine	NARB Réghaïa	Free transfer	
30 June 2010	MF	(Algeria) Abdennour Cherif El Ouazzani	Unattached	Free transfer (Released)	
11 July 2010	DF	(Algeria) (France) Yamin Amiri	Unattached	Free transfer (Released)	
11 July 2010	MF	(Algeria) (France) Djaïd Kasri	Unattached	Free transfer (Released)	
22 December 2010	DF	(Mali) Idrissa Coulibaly	(Libya) Ahly Tripoli	Free transfer	
29 December 2010	FW	(Algeria) Mohamed Amine Aoudia	(Egypt) Zamalek SC	DA14.5 million	
2 January 2011	FW	(Nigeria) Izu Azuka	(Libya) Al-Ittihad Tripoli	Free transfer	
