= 2011–12 CR Belouizdad season =

CR Belouizdad
2011–12 season
- Chairman: Réda Malek
- Head coach: Giovanni Solinas (until 22 November 2011); Djamel Menad (from 23 November 2011)
- Stadium: Stade 20 Août 1955
- Ligue 1: 4th
- Algerian Cup: Runners–up
- Top goalscorer: League: Islam Slimani (10); All: Islam Slimani (12)

In the 2011–12 season, CR Belouizdad competed in the Ligue 1 for the 46th season, as well as the Algerian Cup. CRB finished fourth in Ligue 1, and were Algerian Cup runners up after losing the final against ES Setif 2–1.

== Squad list ==
Players and squad numbers last updated on 18 November 2011.
Note: Flags indicate national team as has been defined under FIFA eligibility rules. Players may hold more than one non-FIFA nationality.

No.	Nat.	Position	Name	Date of birth (age)	Signed from
Goalkeepers
Defenders
Midfielders
Forwards

== Competitions ==
=== Overview ===
Competition	Record								Started round	Final position / round	First match	Last match
Competition	G	W	D	L	GF	GA	GD	Win %	Started round	Final position / round	First match	Last match
Ligue 1	30	13	9	8	34	28	+6	43.33	—N/a	4th	10 September 2011	19 May 2012
Algerian Cup	6	4	1	1	10	2	+8	66.67	Round of 64	Runners–up	30 December 2011	1 May 2012
Total	36	17	10	9	44	30	+14	47.22				

Updated to match played 9 May 2017
Source: Competitions

== League table ==
Pos	Team	Pld	W	D	L	GF	GA	GD	Pts	Qualification or relegation
2	JSM Béjaïa	30	15	8	7	40	26	+14	53	Qualification for the Champions League preliminary round
3	USM Alger	30	15	7	8	37	25	+12	52	Qualification for the Confederation Cup preliminary round
4	CR Belouizdad	30	13	9	8	34	28	+6	48	
5	ASO Chlef	30	14	5	11	41	34	+7	47	
6	MC Alger	30	11	11	8	35	33	+2	44	

Updated to match(es) played on 19 April 2018. Source: DZFoot
Rules for classification: 1) points; 2) head-to-head points; 3) head-to-head goal difference; 4) goal difference; 5) total goals; 6) fairplay ranking; 7) playoff.

=== Results summary ===
Overall								Home						Away					
Pld	W	D	L	GF	GA	GD	Pts	W	D	L	GF	GA	GD	W	D	L	GF	GA	GD
30	13	9	8	34	28	+6	48	8	4	3	22	12	+10	5	5	5	12	16	−4

Last updated: 29 December 2014.
Source: Competitive matches

=== Results by round ===
Round	1	2	3	4	5	6	7	8	9	10	11	12	13	14	15	16	17	18	19	20	21	22	23	24	25	26	27	28	29	30
Ground	H	A	H	H	A	H	A	H	A	H	A	H	A	H	A	A	H	A	A	H	A	H	A	H	A	H	A	H	A	H
Result	W	D	W	W	L	W	W	L	L	L	W	W	D	D	D	W	D	W	L	D	L	W	L	W	L	L	D	D	D	W
Position	2	1	2	1	2	2	2	2	2	6	5	2	3	3	4	4	2	3	4	4	5	4	3	3	4	4	5	5	5	4

Source: Competitive matches
A = Away; H = Home; W = Win; D = Draw; L = Loss

=== Matches ===
10 September 2011 Round 1	CR Belouizdad	2–0	MC El Eulma	Belouizdad
20:00	Kherbache 67'; Slimani 75'	Report		Stadium: Stade 20 Août 1955; Referee: Mohamed Sahraoui

24 September 2011 Round 2	WA Tlemcen	1–1	CR Belouizdad	Tlemcen
19:00	Boudjakdji 68'	Report	Bourakba 83'	Stadium: Stade Akid Lotfi; Referee: Boubekeur Zouaoui

27 September 2011 Round 3	CR Belouizdad	1–0	JS Kabylie	Belouizdad
19:00	Slimani 90+3'	Report		Stadium: Stade 20 Août 1955; Referee: Oulbsir

1 October 2011 Round 4	CR Belouizdad	4–1	MC Oran	Belouizdad
19:00	Abdat 20'; Aksas 33'; Slimani 81'; Bourakba 90+2'	Report	Belaïli 51'	Stadium: Stade 20 Août 1955; Referee: Ramzi Habibatni

15 October 2011 Round 5	USM Alger	2–0	CR Belouizdad	Algiers
18:00	Djediat 43'; Daham 64'	Report		Stadium: Stade 5 Juillet 1962; Referee: Mehdi Abid Charef

22 October 2011 Round 6	CR Belouizdad	3–1	MC Saïda	Belouizdad
19:00	Slimani 7' (pen.); Rebih 34'; Bourakba 55'	Report	Hadiouche 9'	Stadium: Stade 20 Août 1955; Referee: Farouk Mial

29 October 2011 Round 7	NA Hussein Dey	1–2	CR Belouizdad	Algiers
19:00	Saïbi 64'	Report	Rebih 15'; Slimani 57'	Stadium: Stade 5 Juillet 1962; Referee: Djamel Haimoudi

4 November 2011 Round 8	CR Belouizdad	1–3	ES Sétif	Belouizdad
18:00	Abdat 45'	Report	Aoudia 68'; Djahnit 72'; Hachoud 90+2' (pen.)	Stadium: Stade 20 Août 1955; Referee: Mohamed Benouza

19 November 2011 Round 9	ASO Chlef	3–1	CR Belouizdad	Chlef
18:00	Messaoud 18', 23' (pen.); Seguer 61'	Report	Mekehout 67'	Stadium: Stade Mohamed Boumezrag; Referee: Mohamed Amine Ghorbal

22 November 2011 Round 10	CR Belouizdad	1–2	JSM Béjaïa	Belouizdad
18:00	Bourakba 90+1' (pen.)	Report	Megateli 74'; Boulaïnceur 78'	Stadium: Stade 20 Août 1955; Referee: Mehdi Abid Charef

26 November 2011 Round 11	CA Batna	0–2	CR Belouizdad	Batna
15:00		Report	Slimani 65'; Rebih 72'	Stadium: Mustapha Seffouhi Stadium; Referee: Mohamed Sahraoui

3 December 2011 Round 12	CR Belouizdad	2–0	MC Alger	Belouizdad
18:00	Ammour 48'; Kherbache 87'	Report		Stadium: Stade 20 Août 1955; Referee: Redouane Necib

10 December 2011 Round 13	CS Constantine	0–0	CR Belouizdad	Constantine
15:00		Report		Stadium: Stade Mohamed Hamlaoui; Referee: Mohamed Benouza

17 December 2011 Round 14	CR Belouizdad	1–1	USM El Harrach	Belouizdad
18:00	Ammour 41'	Report	Touahri 81'	Stadium: Stade 20 Août 1955; Referee: Farouk Houasnia

24 December 2011 Round 15	AS Khroub	0–0	CR Belouizdad	El Khroub
15:00		Report		Stadium: Abed Hamdani Stadium; Referee: Farouk Mial

21 January 2012 Round 16	MC El Eulma	1–2	CR Belouizdad	El Eulma
15:00	Diarra 23'	Report	Benabderahmane 59'; Oudira 82'	Stadium: Stade Messaoud Zougar; Referee: Mohamed Amine Ghorbal

31 January 2012 Round 17	CR Belouizdad	0–0	WA Tlemcen	Belouizdad
15:00		Report		Stadium: Stade 20 Août 1955; Referee: Rafik Achouri

28 January 2012 Round 18	JS Kabylie	0–1	CR Belouizdad	Tizi Ouzou
15:00		Report	Slimani 69'	Stadium: Stade du 1er Novembre 1954; Referee: Redouane Necib

4 February 2012 Round 19	MC Oran	1–0	CR Belouizdad	Oran
15:00	El Bahari 6'	Report		Stadium: Ahmed Zabana Stadium; Referee: Mehdi Abid Charef

18 February 2012 Round 20	CR Belouizdad	0–0	USM Alger	Algiers
15:00		Report		Stadium: Stade 5 Juillet 1962; Referee: Mokhtar Amalou

3 March 2012 Round 21	MC Saïda	2–0	CR Belouizdad	Saida
15:00	Hadiouche 13'; Mebarakou 64'	Report		Stadium: April 13, 1958 Stadium; Referee: Ramzi Habibatni

17 March 2012 Round 22	CR Belouizdad	1–0	NA Hussein Dey	Algiers
17:45	Slimani 30'	Report		Stadium: Stade 5 Juillet 1962; Referee: Mohamed Bachir

10 April 2012 Round 23	ES Sétif	0–2	CR Belouizdad	Sétif
18:45		Report	Kherbache 26'; Mekehout 90+1'	Stadium: Stade 8 Mai 1945; Referee: Farouk Mial

24 April 2012 Round 24	CR Belouizdad	2–1	ASO Chlef	Belouizdad
16:00	Aksas 54'; Slimani 75'	Report	Oussalé 30'	Stadium: Stade 20 Août 1955; Referee: Ramzi Habibatni

14 April 2012 Round 25	JSM Béjaïa	4–0	CR Belouizdad	Béjaïa
16:00	Aït Fergane 9'; Gasmi 12' (pen.); Boulaïnceur 31'; Benchaïra 83'	Report		Stadium: Stade de l'Unité Maghrébine; Referee: Mohamed Benouza

28 April 2012 Round 26	CR Belouizdad	0–2	CA Batna	Belouizdad
16:00		Report	Merazka 50'; Messadia 64'	Stadium: Stade 20 Août 1955; Referee: Youssef Zerrouki

5 May 2012 Round 27	MC Alger	1–1	CR Belouizdad	Algiers
16:00	Djallit 15'	Report	Slimani 10'	Stadium: Stade 5 Juillet 1962; Referee: Farouk Houasnia

8 May 2012 Round 28	CR Belouizdad	0–0	CS Constantine	Belouizdad
16:00		Report		Stadium: Stade 20 Août 1955; Referee: Mohamed Sahraoui

15 May 2012 Round 29	USM El Harrach	0–0	CR Belouizdad	Algiers
18:00		Report		Stadium: Stade 1er Novembre 1954; Referee: Boubekeur Zouaoui

19 May 2012 Round 30	CR Belouizdad	4–1	AS Khroub	Belouizdad
18:00	Amroune 32'; Oudira 50'; Hamzaoui 52'; Tafat 82'	Report	Bouras 11'	Stadium: Stade 20 Août 1955; Referee: Farouk Mial

== Algerian Cup ==
30 December 2011 Round of 64	CR Belouizdad	2–0	ES Mostaganem	Algiers
14:30	Slimani 38'; Kherbache 81'			Stadium: Stade 20 Août 1955; Referee: Achouri, Dib, Amri

24 February 2012 Round of 32	CR Belouizdad	5–0	JSM Sidi Salem	Algiers
15:00	Rebih 30'; Oudira 33'; Guebli 42'; Aoued 70'; Kherbache 90'			Stadium: Stade 20 Août 1955; Referee: Melles Ayouni

9 March 2012 Round of 16	MC Saïda	0–0 (a.e.t.) (4–5 p)	CR Belouizdad	Saïda
15:00				Stadium: Stade 13 Avril 1958; Referee: Redouane Necib

31 March 2012 Quarter-finals	CR Belouizdad	1–0	ASO Chlef	Algiers
15:00	Slimani 57' (pen.)			Stadium: Stade 20 Août 1955; Referee: Mehdi Abid Charef

20 April 2012 Semi-finals	CR Belouizdad	1–0	CS Constantine	Algiers
16:00	Rebih 58'			Stadium: Stade 20 Août 1955; Referee: Mustapha Ghorbal

1 May 2012 Final	CR Belouizdad	1–2 (a.e.t.)	ES Sétif	Algiers
16:30	Ammour 82'		Hachoud 22'; Benmoussa 96'	Stadium: Stade 5 Juillet 1962; Referee: Mokhtar Amalou

== Squad information ==
=== Playing statistics ===
No.	Pos	Nat	Player	Total		Ligue 1		Algerian Cup	
No.	Pos	Nat	Player	Apps	Goals	Apps	Goals	Apps	Goals
Goalkeepers
1	GK	(Algeria) ALG	Mohamed Ousserir	29	0	25	0	4	0
16	GK	(Algeria) ALG	Hamza Dahmane	7	0	5	0	2	0
Defenders
4	DF	(Algeria) ALG	Abdelkrim Mameri	23	0	17	0	6	0
24	DF	(Algeria) ALG	Khalil Boukedjane	24	0	21	0	3	0
20	DF	(Algeria) ALG	Amine Aksas	20	2	15	2	5	0
2	DF	(Algeria) ALG	Fayçal Abdat	30	2	25	2	5	0
27	DF	(Algeria) ALG	Farès Benabderahmane	24	1	22	1	2	0
21	DF	(Algeria) ALG	Mohamed Herida	3	0	2	0	1	0
15	DF	(Algeria) ALG	Abdelmalik Aouameur	7	0	6	0	1	0
8	DF	(Algeria) ALG	Mohamed Billel Benaldjia	22	0	18	0	4	0
30	DF	(Algeria) ALG	Lyes Boukria	26	0	22	0	4	0
3	DF	(Algeria) ALG	Ishak Guebli	7	1	5	0	2	1
	DF	(Algeria) ALG	Anis Kerrar	5	0	3	0	2	0
	DF	(Tunisia) TUN	Mehdi Hamzaoui	1	1	1	1	0	0
	DF	(Algeria) ALG	Zakaria Boufriche	1	0	1	0	0	0
Midfielders
11	MF	(Algeria) ALG	Hamza Aït Ouamar	7	0	7	0	0	0
29	MF	(Algeria) ALG	Mohamed Lahmar Abbou	9	0	7	0	2	0
10	MF	(Algeria) ALG	Mohamed El Amine Aouad	22	1	16	0	6	1
28	MF	(Algeria) ALG	Amar Ammour	32	3	26	2	6	1
6	MF	(Algeria) ALG	Ahmed Mekehout	30	2	26	2	4	0
14	MF	(Algeria) ALG	Billel Naïli	24	0	20	0	4	0
13	MF	(Algeria) ALG	Merouane Anane	12	0	10	0	2	0
12	MF	(Algeria) ALG	Mohamed Kherbache	29	5	23	3	6	2
	MF	(Ghana) GHA	Deen Sheriff Mohammed	5	0	5	0	0	0
	MF	(Algeria) ALG	Ahmed Tafat	1	1	1	1	0	0
Forwards
18	FW	(Algeria) ALG	Aboubaker Rebih	31	5	26	3	5	2
9	FW	(Algeria) ALG	Islam Slimani	31	12	26	10	5	2
	FW	(Algeria) ALG	Mohamed Amroune	6	1	5	1	1	0
	FW	(Algeria) ALG	Fayçal Oudira	10	3	8	2	2	1
	FW	(Algeria) ALG	Zoheir Benayache	1	0	1	0	0	0
	FW	(Algeria) ALG	Mustapha Zeghnoun	2	0	2	0	0	0
Players transferred out during the season
19	FW	(Algeria) ALG	Ramzi Bourakba	13	4	13	4	0	0

Last updated: 28 November 2017
Source: fr.soccerway.com

=== Goalscorers ===
Includes all competitive matches. The list is sorted alphabetically by surname when total goals are equal.

No.	Nat.	Player	Pos.	L 1	AC	TOTAL
9	(Algeria)	Islam Slimani	FW	10	2	12
18	(Algeria)	Aboubaker Rebih	FW	3	2	5
12	(Algeria)	Mohamed Kherbache	MF	3	2	5
19	(Algeria)	Ramzi Bourakba	FW	4	0	4
	(Algeria)	Fayçal Oudira	FW	2	1	3
28	(Algeria)	Amar Ammour	MF	2	1	3
6	(Algeria)	Ahmed Mekehout	MF	2	0	2
20	(Algeria)	Amine Aksas	DF	2	0	2
2	(Algeria)	Fayçal Abdat	DF	2	0	2
	(Algeria)	Mohamed Amroune	FW	1	0	1
	(Algeria)	Ahmed Tafat	MF	1	0	1
27	(Algeria)	Farès Benabderahmane	DF	1	0	1
	(Tunisia)	Mehdi Hamzaoui	DF	1	0	1
10	(Algeria)	Mohamed El Amine Aouad	MF	0	1	1
3	(Algeria)	Ishak Guebli	DF	0	1	1
Own Goals				0	0	0
Totals				34	10	44

== Transfers ==
=== In ===
Date	Pos	Player	From club	Transfer fee	Source
1 July 2011	DF	(Algeria) Ishak Guebli	JSM Chéraga	Undisclosed	
1 July 2011	MF	(Algeria) Billel Naïli	JS Kabylie	Undisclosed	
1 July 2011	FW	(Algeria) Mohamed Amroune	MO Constantine	Undisclosed	
12 July 2011	DF	(Algeria) Farès Benabderahmane	USM El Harrach	Undisclosed	
10 August 2011	MF	(Algeria) Hamza Aït Ouamar	USM Alger	Undisclosed	
18 August 2011	DF	(Algeria) Abdelmalik Aouameur	USM El Harrach	Undisclosed	
24 August 2011	MF	(Ghana) Deen Sheriff Mohammed	(Bangladesh) Dhaka Abahani	Undisclosed	
1 January 2012	MF	(Algeria) Zoheir Benayache	USM El Harrach	Undisclosed	
1 January 2012	FW	(Algeria) Fayçal Oudira	CS Constantine	Undisclosed	

=== Out ===
Date	Pos	Player	To club	Transfer fee	Source
7 August 2011	GK	(Algeria) Nadjib Ghoul	NA Hussein Dey	Free transfer	
12 August 2011	FW	(Algeria) Youcef Saïbi	NA Hussein Dey	Free transfer	
2 January 2012	FW	(Algeria) Ramzi Bourakba	(Saudi Arabia) Najran SC	Free transfer	
