= 2013–14 CR Belouizdad season =

CR Belouizdad
2013–14 season
- Chairman: Réda Malek
- Head coach: Mohamed Henkouche
- Stadium: Stade 20 Août 1955
- Ligue 1: 13th
- Algerian Cup: Round of 64
- Top goalscorer: League: Ramzi Bourakba (7); All: Ramzi Bourekba (7)

In the 2013–14 season, CR Belouizdad competed in Ligue 1 for the 48th season, as well as the Algerian Cup.

== Squad list ==
Players and squad numbers last updated on 18 November 2018.
Note: Flags indicate national team as has been defined under FIFA eligibility rules. Players may hold more than one non-FIFA nationality.

No.	Nat.	Position	Name	Date of birth (age)	Signed from
Goalkeepers
Defenders
Midfielders
Forwards

== Competitions ==
=== Overview ===
Competition	Record								Started round	Final position / round	First match	Last match
Competition	G	W	D	L	GF	GA	GD	Win %	Started round	Final position / round	First match	Last match
Ligue 1	30	9	5	16	26	33	−7	30.00	—N/a	13th	24 August 2013	24 May 2014
Algerian Cup	1	0	0	1	0	1	−1	0.00	Round of 64		7 December 2013	
Total	31	9	5	17	26	34	−8	29.03				

Updated to match played 9 May 2017
Source: Competitions

== League table ==
Pos	Team	Pld	W	D	L	GF	GA	GD	Pts	Qualification or relegation
11	MO Béjaïa	30	10	6	14	29	35	−6	36	
12	MC Oran	30	9	8	13	33	40	−7	35	
13	CR Belouizdad	30	9	5	16	26	33	−7	32	
14	JSM Béjaïa (R)	30	7	7	16	24	44	−20	28	Relegation to Ligue Professionnelle 2
15	CA Bordj Bou Arréridj (R)	30	4	9	17	23	47	−24	21	Relegation to Ligue Professionnelle 2

Updated to match(es) played on 22 May 2014. Source: DZFoot
Rules for classification: 1) points; 2) head-to-head points; 3) head-to-head goal difference; 4) goal difference; 5) total goals; 6) fairplay ranking; 7) playoff.
(R) Relegated

=== Results summary ===
Overall								Home						Away					
Pld	W	D	L	GF	GA	GD	Pts	W	D	L	GF	GA	GD	W	D	L	GF	GA	GD
30	9	5	16	26	33	−7	32	8	4	3	18	12	+6	1	1	13	8	21	−13

Last updated: 29 December 2014.
Source: Competitive matches

=== Results by round ===
Round	1	2	3	4	5	6	7	8	9	10	11	12	13	14	15	16	17	18	19	20	21	22	23	24	25	26	27	28	29	30
Ground	H	A	H	A	H	A	H	A	H	A	H	A	H	A	A	A	H	A	H	A	H	A	H	A	H	A	H	A	H	H
Result	W	L	L	L	W	D	W	L	W	L	D	L	D	L	L	L	W	L	L	L	W	L	W	L	L	L	D	W	D	L
Position																														

Updated to match(es) played on 29 December 2014. Source: Competitive matches
A = Away; H = Home; W = Win; D = Draw; L = Loss

=== Matches ===
24 August 2013 Round 1	CR Belouizdad	1–0	RC Arbaâ	Algiers
18:00	Bourakba 83'	Report		Stadium: Stade 20 Août 1955; Referee: Djamel Haimoudi

31 August 2013 Round 2	ASO Chlef	2–1	CR Belouizdad	Chlef
18:00	Daham 8'; Haddouche 41'	Report	55' (pen.) Hanifi	Stadium: Stade Mohamed Boumezrag; Referee: Rafik Achouri

3 September 2013 Round 3	CR Belouizdad	1–2	ES Sétif	Algiers
18:00	Dahar 61'	Report	51' Ziti; 79' Zerara	Stadium: Stade 20 Août 1955; Referee: Mustapha Ghorbal

14 September 2013 Round 4	MC Alger	2–1	CR Belouizdad	Algiers
17:45	Kacem 37'; Hachoud 76'	Report	68' Bourakba	Stadium: Stade 5 Juillet 1962; Referee: Farouk Houasnia

20 September 2013 Round 5	CR Belouizdad	1–0	JS Kabylie	Algiers
16:45	Hanifi 23'	Report		Stadium: Stade 20 Août 1955; Referee: Mohamed Bichari

28 September 2013 Round 6	CA Bordj Bou Arréridj	1–1	CR Belouizdad	Bordj Bou Arréridj
18:00	Bendahmane 21'	Report	68' Hanifi	Stadium: Stade 20 Août 1955; Referee: Mohamed Saïdi

5 October 2013 Round 7	CR Belouizdad	2–1	JS Saoura	Algiers
17:00	Bourakba 29'; Hanifi 47' (pen.)	Report	57' (pen.) M. Mebarki	Stadium: Stade 20 Août 1955; Attendance: 0 (close doors); Referee: Abderrezzak Arab

19 October 2013 Round 8	MO Béjaïa	1–0	CR Belouizdad	Béjaïa
18:00	F. Rahal 78'	Report		Stadium: Stade de l'Unité Maghrébine; Referee: Mehdi Abid Charef

25 October 2013 Round 9	CR Belouizdad	2–1	USM El Harrach	Algiers
17:00	Dahar 3', 44'	Report	36' (pen.) Amada	Stadium: Stade 20 Août 1955; Referee: Mohamed Ghorbal

2 November 2013 Round 10	CS Constantine	1–0	CR Belouizdad	Constantine
15:00	Bezzaz 39' (pen.)	Report		Stadium: Stade Mohamed Hamlaoui; Referee: Said Aouina

9 November 2013 Round 11	CR Belouizdad	1–1	MC El Eulma	Algiers
15:00	Hanifi 23' (pen.)	Report	57' Hamiti	Stadium: Stade 20 Août 1955; Referee: Mohamed Benouza

22 November 2013 Round 12	USM Alger	2–0	CR Belouizdad	Algiers
17:45	Djediat 6'; Gasmi 22'	Report		Stadium: Stade Omar Hamadi; Referee: Mokhtar Amalou

30 November 2013 Round 13	CR Belouizdad	0–0	CRB Aïn Fakroun	Algiers
16:00		Report		Stadium: Stade 20 Août 1955; Referee: Mohamed Sahraoui

14 December 2013 Round 14	MC Oran	1–0	CR Belouizdad	Oran
17:45	Chérif 58'	Report		Stadium: Ahmed Zabana Stadium; Referee: Rafik Achouri

28 December 2013 Round 15	JSM Béjaïa	1–0	CR Belouizdad	Béjaïa
15:00	O. Meddahi 70'	Report		Stadium: Stade de l'Unité Maghrébine; Referee: Mohamed Ghorbal

18 January 2014 Round 16	RC Arbaâ	3–2	CR Belouizdad	Blida
15:00	Bougueroua 39' (pen.), 78', 82' (pen.)	Report	14', 50' Rebih	Stadium: Stade Frères Brakni; Referee: Boubekeur Zouaoui

1 February 2014 Round 17	CR Belouizdad	1–0	ASO Chlef	Algiers
15:00	Khoudi 26'	Report		Stadium: Stade 20 Août 1955; Referee: Mehdi Abid Charef

7 February 2014 Round 18	ES Sétif	1–0	CR Belouizdad	Sétif
16:00	Boukria 25'	Report		Stadium: Stade 8 Mai 1945; Referee: Youssef Zerrouki

14 February 2014 Round 19	CR Belouizdad	0–1	MC Alger	Algiers
16:00		Report	90+5' Zeghdane	Stadium: Stade 20 Août 1955; Referee: Mohamed Saïdi

22 February 2014 Round 20	JS Kabylie	3–1	CR Belouizdad	Tizi Ouzou
15:00	Ebossé Bodjongo 15'; Benlamri 38', 55'	Report	53' Dahmane	Stadium: Stade du 1er Novembre 1954; Referee: Mohamed Benouza

1 March 2014 Round 21	CR Belouizdad	2–0	CA Bordj Bou Arréridj	Algiers
15:00	Dahmane 47'; Khoudi 58'	Report		Stadium: Stade 20 Août 1955; Referee: Sofiane Bousseter

8 March 2014 Round 22	JS Saoura	1–0	CR Belouizdad	Béchar
15:00	Bagayoko 90+3'	Report		Stadium: Stade 20 Août 1955; Referee: Rafik Achouri

15 March 2014 Round 23	CR Belouizdad	1–0	MO Béjaïa	Algiers
15:00	Ahmed Fathi Mohamed 69'	Report		Stadium: Stade 20 Août 1955; Referee: Mohamed Sahraoui

22 March 2014 Round 24	USM El Harrach	1–0	CR Belouizdad	Algiers
15:00	Abid 44'	Report		Stadium: Stade 1er Novembre 1954; Referee: Mohamed Bichari

26 April 2014 Round 25	CR Belouizdad	2–1	CS Constantine	Algiers
15:00	Bencherifa 30'; Bourakba 67'	Report	85' Boulemdaïs	Stadium: Stade 20 Août 1955; Referee: Djamel Haimoudi

3 May 2014 Round 26	MC El Eulma	1–0	CR Belouizdad	El Eulma
18:00	Chenihi 56'	Report		Stadium: Stade Messaoud Zougar; Referee: Redouane Necib

10 May 2014 Round 27	CR Belouizdad	2–2	USM Alger	Algiers
17:00	Bencherifa 42'; Benaldjia 90+1' (pen.)	Report	52', 65' Chafaï	Stadium: Stade 20 Août 1955; Referee: Lahlou Benbraham

13 May 2014 Round 28	CRB Aïn Fakroun	0–2	CR Belouizdad	Aïn M'lila
17:00		Report	2' Rebih; 28' Bourakba	Stadium: Stade des Frères Demane Debbih; Referee: Mohamed Saïdi

17 May 2014 Round 29	CR Belouizdad	2–2	MC Oran	Algiers
17:00	Bourakba 4', 65' (pen.)	Report	41' Bouaïcha; 90' O. Belatoui	Stadium: Stade 20 Août 1955; Referee: Mehdi Abid Charef

24 May 2014 Round 30	CR Belouizdad	0–1	JSM Béjaïa	Algiers
17:00		Report	86' N. Aït Fergane	Stadium: Stade 20 Août 1955; Referee: Mohamed Boukhalfa

== Algerian Cup ==
7 December 2013 Round of 64	MO Béjaïa	1–0	CR Belouizdad	Béjaïa
16:00	Yettou 17'			Stadium: Stade de l'Unité Maghrébine

== Squad information ==
=== Playing statistics ===
No.	Pos	Nat	Player	Total		Ligue 1		Algerian Cup	
No.	Pos	Nat	Player	Apps	Goals	Apps	Goals	Apps	Goals
Goalkeepers
21	GK	(Algeria) ALG	El Hadi Ouadah	16	0	15	0	1	0
22	GK	(Algeria) ALG	Ahmed Walid Chouih	15	0	15	0	0	0
45	GK	(Algeria) ALG	Mohamed Ramzy Abbassi	1	0	1	0	0	0
Defenders
24	DF	(Algeria) ALG	Khalil Boukedjane	7	0	7	0	0	0
17	DF	(Algeria) ALG	Fayçal Abdat	22	0	22	0	0	0
8	DF	(Algeria) ALG	Mohamed Billel Benaldjia	19	0	18	0	1	0
5	DF	(Algeria) ALG	Sofiane Harkat	7	0	6	0	1	0
20	DF	(Algeria) ALG	Sofiane Khelili	27	0	26	0	1	0
28	DF	(Algeria) ALG	Amine Tiza	17	0	16	0	1	0
56	DF	(Algeria) ALG	Adel Messaoudi	13	0	13	0	0	0
4	DF	(Algeria) ALG	Anis Kerrar	7	0	6	0	1	0
23	DF	(Algeria) ALG	Hakim Khoudi	18	2	18	2	0	0
	DF	(Algeria) ALG	Zakaria Bencherifa	8	2	8	2	0	0
Midfielders
83	MF	(Algeria) ALG	Fodil Hadjadj	18	0	18	0	0	0
11	MF	(Algeria) ALG	Billel Attafen	16	0	15	0	1	0
10	MF	(Algeria) ALG	Amar Ammour	20	0	19	0	1	0
6	MF	(Algeria) ALG	Ahmed Mekehout	20	0	19	0	1	0
14	MF	(Algeria) ALG	Billel Naïli	5	0	5	0	0	0
	MF	(Algeria) ALG	Mehdi Benaldjia	12	1	12	1	0	0
13	MF	(Algeria) ALG	Merouane Anane	20	0	19	0	1	0
12	MF	(Algeria) ALG	Mohamed Smain Kherbache	19	0	19	0	0	0
29	MF	(Algeria) ALG	Zakaria Mansour	6	0	6	0	0	0
	MF	(Algeria) ALG	Alane	1	0	1	0	0	0
	MF	(Algeria) ALG	Mesfar	1	0	1	0	0	0
Forwards
	FW	(Algeria) ALG	Mohamed Dahmane	7	2	7	2	0	0
18	FW	(Algeria) ALG	Aboubaker Rebih	30	3	29	3	1	0
62	FW	(Algeria) ALG	Ramzi Bourakba	25	7	24	7	1	0
19	FW	(Algeria) ALG	Salim Hanifi	12	5	11	5	1	0
	FW	(Egypt) EGY	Ahmed Fathi Mohamed	12	1	12	1	0	0
34	FW	(Algeria) ALG	Merouane Dahar	26	3	25	3	1	0
	FW	(Algeria) ALG	Zakaria Khaldi	1	0	1	0	0	0
Players transferred out during the season

Last updated: 9 October 2017
Source: fr.soccerway.com

=== Goalscorers ===
Includes all competitive matches. The list is sorted alphabetically by surname when total goals are equal.

No.	Nat.	Player	Pos.	L 1	AC	TOTAL
62	(Algeria)	Ramzi Bourakba	FW	7	0	7
19	(Algeria)	Salim Hanifi	FW	5	0	5
18	(Algeria)	Aboubaker Rebih	FW	3	0	3
34	(Algeria)	Merouane Dahar	FW	3	0	3
	(Algeria)	Mohamed Dahmane	FW	2	0	2
23	(Algeria)	Hakim Khoudi	DF	2	0	2
	(Algeria)	Zakaria Bencherifa	DF	2	0	2
	(Egypt)	Ahmed Fathi Mohamed	FW	1	0	1
	(Algeria)	Mehdi Benaldjia	MF	1	0	1
Own Goals				0	0	0
Totals				26	0	26

== Transfers ==
=== In ===
Date	Pos	Player	From club	Transfer fee	Source
1 July 2013	DF	(Algeria) Sofiane Khelili	JS Kabylie	Undisclosed	
1 July 2013	DF	(Algeria) Amine Tiza	WA Tlemcen	Free transfer	
1 July 2013	DF	(Algeria) Zakaria Bencherifa	Reserve team	First Professional Contract	
1 July 2013	DF	(Algeria) Anis Kerrar	Reserve team	First Professional Contract	
8 July 2013	MF	(Algeria) Billel Attafen	MC Alger	Free transfer	
9 July 2013	GK	(Algeria) El Hadi Ouadah	Unattached	Free transfer	
15 July 2013	FW	(Algeria) Salim Hanifi	USM Alger	Free transfer	
30 July 2013	FW	(Algeria) Ramzi Bourakba	MC El Eulma	Free transfer	
6 December 2013	FW	(Algeria) Mohamed Dahmane	CS Constantine	Free transfer	
25 December 2013	MF	(Algeria) Mehdi Benaldjia	USM Alger	Loan one year and a half	
3 January 2014	FW	(Egypt) Ahmed Fathi Mohamed	(Iraq) EL Talaba	Undisclosed	

=== Out ===
Date	Pos	Player	To club	Transfer fee	Source
15 June 2013	MF	(Algeria) Lyes Boukria	ES Sétif	Free transfer	
30 June 2013	MF	(Algeria) Mehdi Benaldjia	USM Alger	Return from loan	
6 August 2013	FW	(Algeria) Islam Slimani	(Portugal) Sporting CP	Undisclosed	
