= 2016–17 RC Relizane season =

RC Relizane
2016–17 season
- Chairman: Mohamed Hamri
- Head coach: Moez Bouakaz (from 14 July 2016)
- Ligue 1: 14th
- Algerian Cup: Round of 32
- Top goalscorer: League: Mourad Benayad (11); All: Mourad Benayad (11)

In the 2016–17 season, RC Relizane is competing in the Ligue 1 for the 7th season, as well as the Algerian Cup.

== Competitions ==
=== Overview ===
Competition	Record								Started round	Final position / round	First match	Last match
Competition	G	W	D	L	GF	GA	GD	Win %	Started round	Final position / round	First match	Last match
Ligue 1	30	12	6	12	34	32	+2	40.00	—N/a	14th	20 August 2016	14 June 2017
Algerian Cup	2	1	0	1	2	3	−1	50.00	Round of 64	Round of 32	26 November 2016	17 December 2016
Total	32	13	6	13	36	35	+1	40.63				

== League table ==
Pos	Team	Pld	W	D	L	GF	GA	GD	Pts	Qualification or relegation
12	Olympique de Médéa	30	10	8	12	32	40	−8	38 (Note: JS Kabylie ahead of Olympique de Médéa on head-to-head record: JSK–OMM 0–1, OMM–JSK 1–2.)	
13	USM El Harrach	30	7	15	8	15	21	−6	36 (Note: RC Relizane ahead of USM El Harrach on head-to-head record: RCR–UEH 0–0, UEH–RCR 0–0 however goal difference in the first leg RCR (−8) UEH (−1).)	
14	RC Relizane (Note: RC Relizane were deducted 3 points.) (R)	30	12	6	12	34	32	+2	36	Relegation to Ligue Professionnelle 2
15	CA Batna (R)	30	6	7	17	20	42	−22	25	Relegation to Ligue Professionnelle 2
16	MO Béjaïa (Note: MO Béjaïa recorded a match lost by penalty against JS Saoura because they were reduced to less than 7 players (Art. 84 Regulation of the Ligue Professionnelle 1 / Art 89 Disciplinary Code). In addition, the Bejaia club was deprived of their share of the television rights for this match. It was also punished by a deduction of 1 point and a fine of 100,000 DA.) (R)	30	3	10	17	23	49	−26	18	Relegation to Ligue Professionnelle 2

Updated to match(es) played on 14 June 2017. Source: DZFoot
Rules for classification: 1) points; 2) head-to-head points; 3) head-to-head goal difference; 4) goal difference; 5) total goals; 6) fairplay ranking; 7) playoff.
(R) Relegated

=== Results summary ===
Overall								Home						Away					
Pld	W	D	L	GF	GA	GD	Pts	W	D	L	GF	GA	GD	W	D	L	GF	GA	GD
30	12	6	12	34	32	+2	42	11	2	2	27	8	+19	1	4	10	7	24	−17

Last updated: 30 January 2016.
Source: Competitive matches

=== Results by round ===
Round	1	2	3	4	5	6	7	8	9	10	11	12	13	14	15	16	17	18	19	20	21	22	23	24	25	26	27	28	29	30
Ground	H	A	H	A	H	A	H	A	H	H	A	H	A	H	A	A	H	A	H	A	H	A	H	A	A	H	A	H	A	H
Result	L	L	L	L	W	W	D	D	W	W	L	W	L	D	D	L	W	D	W	L	W	L	W	L	L	W	L	W	D	W
Position	16	16	16	16	16	16	16	16	16	15	15	15	15	15	15	15	15	15	13	14	12	14	11	12	12	12	14	14	14	14

Updated to match(es) played on 30 January 2016. Source: Competitive matches
A = Away; H = Home; W = Win; D = Draw; L = Loss

=== Matches ===
Win Draw Loss

20 August 2016 Round 1	RC Relizane	0–3 (Note: On 20 August 2016 Indeed, the match RC Relizane - NA Hussein Dey has officially been deprogrammed. Neither the visiting team nor the officials could not reach the chamber of Stade Tahar Zoughari Relizane. "Cheer" premises have prevented access to teams and officials and protesting the non-qualification of new recruits to the West country club by the Football League.)	NA Hussein Dey	Relizane
17:30		Soccerway report Live TV: None		Stadium: Stade Tahar Zoughari

27 August 2016 Round 2	USM Alger	6–0	RC Relizane	Bologhine
19:00	Bentoucha 6' (o.g.); Meftah 24' (pen.); Guessan 41'; Benkhemassa 45'; Andria 71'; Darfalou 88'	Report; Live TV: None		Stadium: Stade Omar Hamadi; Attendance: 0 (close doors); Referee: Said Aouina

10 September 2016 Round 3	RC Relizane	0–1	MC Oran	Relizane
17:00		Report; Live TV: beIN Sports / Canal Algérie	83' Nessakh	Stadium: Stade Tahar Zoughari; Referee: Lotfi Bekouassa

17 September 2016 Round 4	DRB Tadjenanet	2–1	RC Relizane	Tadjenanet
16:30	Djahel 39', 49'	Report; Live TV: None	71' Benayad	Stadium: Lahoua Smaïl Stadium; Referee: Merzak Halalchi

24 September 2016 Round 5	RC Relizane	3–0	JS Saoura	Relizane
16:30	Benayad 2', 60'; Anane 22'	Report; Live TV: Canal Algérie		Stadium: Stade Tahar Zoughari; Referee: Sekhraoui Sekhraoui

4 October 2016 Round 6	MO Béjaïa	0–1	RC Relizane	Béjaïa
19:00		Report; Live TV: None	80' Benayad	Stadium: Stade de l'Unité Maghrébine; Referee: Rafik Achouri

14 October 2016 Round 7	RC Relizane	0–0	ES Sétif	Relizane
16:00		Report; Live TV: EPTV Terrestre / Canal Algérie		Stadium: Stade Tahar Zoughari; Referee: Said Aouina

20 October 2016 Round 8	CS Constantine	0–0	RC Relizane	Constantine
17:00		Report; Live TV: Canal Algérie / TV Tamazight 4		Stadium: Stade Mohamed Hamlaoui; Referee: Farouk Mial

28 October 2016 Round 9	RC Relizane	1–0	CR Belouizdad	Relizane
16:00	Tebbi 45'	Report; Live TV: EPTV Terrestre / TV Tamazight 4		Stadium: Stade Tahar Zoughari; Referee: Boubekeur Zouaoui

4 November 2016 Round 10	RC Relizane	2–0	USM Bel-Abbès	Relizane
16:00	Tebbi 45'; Belmokhtar 80'	Report; Live TV: EPTV Terrestre / Canal Algérie		Stadium: Stade Tahar Zoughari; Referee: Mohamed Boukhalfa

11 November 2016 Round 11	Olympique de Médéa	2–1	RC Relizane	Médéa
15:30	Hamia 48', 88'	Report; Live TV: None	72' Remache	Stadium: Stade Imam Lyes de Médéa; Referee: Lotfi Bekouassa

19 November 2016 Round 12	RC Relizane	3–1	JS Kabylie	Relizane
15:00	Tebbi 31'; Benayad 41'; Remache 65'	Report; Live TV: TV Tamazight 4	57' Boulaouidet	Stadium: Stade Tahar Zoughari; Referee: Lotfi Bekouassa

2 December 2016 Round 13	MC Alger	2–0	RC Relizane	Bologhine
17:00	Hachoud 57', 87' (pen.)	Report; Live TV: None		Stadium: Omar Hamadi Stadium; Attendance: 0 (close doors); Referee: Rafik Achouri

9 December 2016 Round 14	RC Relizane	0–0	USM El Harrach	Relizane
15:00		Report; Live TV: Canal Algérie		Stadium: Stade Tahar Zoughari; Referee: Ahmed Bouzrar

24 December 2016 Round 15	CA Batna	1–1	RC Relizane	Batna
14:30	Attouche 55'	Report; Live TV: None	79' Benayad	Stadium: Mustapha Seffouhi Stadium; Referee: Marzouk Brahimi

21 January 2017 Round 16	NA Hussein Dey	1–0	RC Relizane	Mohamed Belouizdad
16:00	Laribi 60'	Report; Live TV: None		Stadium: August 20, 1955 Stadium; Referee: Amine Hansal

25 March 2017 Round 17	RC Relizane	2–0	USM Alger	Relizane
16:00; Match rescheduled due to share some of their players in the African Cup and World Cup military	Guebli 24'; Benayad 33'	Report; Live TV: Canal Algérie		Stadium: Stade Tahar Zoughari; Referee: Merzoug Brahimi

4 February 2017 Round 18	MC Oran	2–2	RC Relizane	Oran
16:00	Benayad 68' (o.g.); Chérif 79'	Report; Live TV: Algérie 3 / Canal Algérie	28' Benayad; 45+2' Guebli	Stadium: Ahmed Zabana Stadium; Referee: Lotfi Bekouassa

11 February 2017 Round 19	RC Relizane	3–1	DRB Tadjenanet	Relizane
15:00	Belmokhtar 18'; Derrag 38'; Meziane 90'	Report; Live TV: Algérie 3	65' Guerabis	Stadium: Stade Tahar Zoughari; Referee: Lahlou Benbraham

31 March 2017 Round 20	JS Saoura	1–0	RC Relizane	Béchar
18:00; Match rescheduled due to JS Saoura competing in the 2017 CAF Champions League	Bellatreche 89'	Report; Live TV: None		Stadium: August 20, 1955 Stadium; Referee: Amine Hansal

23 February 2017 Round 21	RC Relizane	1–0	MO Béjaïa	Relizane
16:00	Zidane 36' (pen.)	Report; Live TV: Canal Algérie / TV Tamazight 4		Stadium: Stade Tahar Zoughari; Referee: Said Aouina

3 March 2017 Round 22	ES Sétif	3–1	RC Relizane	Sétif
16:00	Ziti 49'; Tembeng 61'; Aït Ouamar 65'	Report; Live TV: TV Tamazight 4 / Algérie 3	10' Zidane	Stadium: Stade 8 Mai 1945; Referee: Abderrezzak Arab

10 March 2017 Round 23	RC Relizane	3–0	CS Constantine	Relizane
16:00	Derrag 26'; Benayad 49' (pen.); Mekkaoui 90+2'	Report; Live TV: Canal Algérie / EPTV Terrestre		Stadium: Stade Tahar Zoughari; Referee: Amine Sekhraoui

18 March 2017 Round 24	CR Belouizdad	1–0	RC Relizane	Mohamed Belouizdad
15:00	Draoui 34'	Report; Live TV: None		Stadium: August 20, 1955 Stadium; Referee: Yazid Ibrir

6 May 2017 Round 25	USM Bel Abbès	2–0	RC Relizane	Sidi Bel Abbès
16:00	Balegh 22' (pen.); Tabti 74'	Report; Live TV: None		Stadium: Stade 24 Fevrier 1956; Referee: Lyés Boukouassa

13 May 2017 Round 26	RC Relizane	1–0	Olympique de Médéa	Relizane
16:00	Guebli 69'	Report; Live TV: Algérie 3		Stadium: Stade Tahar Zoughari; Referee: Marzouk Brahimi

20 May 2017 Round 27	JS Kabylie	1–0	RC Relizane	Tizi Ouzou
18:00	Boulaouidet 11'	Report; Live TV: None		Stadium: November 1, 1954 Stadium; Referee: Rafik Achouri

7 June 2017 Round 28	RC Relizane	3–2	MC Alger	Relizane
17:00	Belmokhtar 32', 40'; Guebli 87'	Report; Live TV: EPTV Terrestre	48' Kacem; 54' Amachi	Stadium: Stade Tahar Zoughari; Referee: Farouk Mial

10 June 2017 Round 29	USM El Harrach	0–0	RC Relizane	El Harrach
17:00		Report; Live TV: None		Stadium: November 1, 1954 Stadium; Referee: Ahmed Bouzrar

14 June 2017 Round 30	RC Relizane	5–0	CA Batna	Relizane
17:00	Tebbi 31'; Derrag 37'; Belmokhtar 70'; Mazouni 71'; Benayad 85'	Report; Live TV: None		Stadium: Stade Tahar Zoughari; Attendance: 0 (close doors); Referee: Amine Sekhraoui

== Algerian Cup ==
26 November 2016 Round of 64	RC Relizane	2–1	ES Mostaganem	Relizane
15:00	Tebbi 20'; Nemdil 50'	Live TV: Canal Algérie	Belahouel 59'	Stadium: Stade Tahar Zoughari; Referee: Benouza, Amari, Zitri

17 December 2016 Round of 32	USM Bel Abbès	2–0	RC Relizane	Sidi Bel Abbès
16:00	Balegh 42'; Lamali 76'	Live TV: Canal Algérie		Stadium: Stade 24 Fevrier 1956; Referee: Benbrahem, Gourari, Allaoua

== Squad information ==
=== Playing statistics ===
No.	Pos	Nat	Player	Total		Ligue 1		Algerian Cup	
No.	Pos	Nat	Player	Apps	Goals	Apps	Goals	Apps	Goals
Goalkeepers
30	GK	(Algeria) ALG	Islam Batchali	1	0	1	0	0	0
1	GK	(Algeria) ALG	Mustapha Zaidi	24	0	22	0	2	0
16	GK	(Algeria) ALG	Hamza Bousseder	6	0	6	0	0	0
Defenders
29	DF	(Algeria) ALG	Farès Aggoune	4	0	4	0	0	0
	DF	(Algeria) ALG	Hichem Djelloul Benelhadj	1	0	1	0	0	0
	DF	(Algeria) ALG	Abderezak Bentoucha	2	0	2	0	0	0
	DF	(Algeria) ALG	Habib Benyamina	1	0	1	0	0	0
18	DF	(Algeria) ALG	Ishak Guebli	27	0	25	0	2	0
14	DF	(Algeria) ALG	Zineddine Mekkaoui	25	0	24	0	1	0
3	DF	(Algeria) ALG	Abdelkader Messaoudi	15	0	14	0	1	0
	DF	(Algeria) ALG	Mehdi Meziane	1	0	1	0	0	0
27	DF	(Algeria) ALG	Belkacem Remache	25	0	24	0	1	0
17	DF	(Algeria) ALG	Oussama Tebbi	17	1	15	0	2	1
21	DF	(Algeria) ALG	Fouad Yagoub	1	0	1	0	0	0
23	DF	(Algeria) ALG	Mohamed Amine Zidane	28	0	27	0	1	0
Midfielders
20	MF	(Algeria) ALG	Fouad Allag	19	0	18	0	1	0
13	MF	(Algeria) ALG	Merouane Anane	26	0	24	0	2	0
	MF	(Algeria) ALG	Hamou Boughoubaï	1	0	1	0	0	0
	MF	(Algeria) ALG	Chérif Said Bourenane	1	0	1	0	0	0
	MF	(Algeria) ALG	Billel Bouzid	1	0	1	0	0	0
	MF	(Algeria) ALG	El Hadj El Habib Chahloul	1	0	1	0	0	0
	MF	(Algeria) ALG	Bilel Hadj Ali	1	0	1	0	0	0
4	MF	(Algeria) ALG	Hocine Harrouche	11	0	11	0	0	0
5	MF	(Algeria) ALG	Walid Hellal	15	0	14	0	1	0
10	MF	(Algeria) ALG	Houcine Riad Eddine Mazouni	7	0	5	0	2	0
11	MF	(Algeria) ALG	Karim Meddahi	21	0	19	0	2	0
26	MF	(Algeria) ALG	Fayçal Moundji	6	0	6	0	0	0
	MF	(Algeria) ALG	Zahir Nemdil	17	1	15	0	2	1
Forwards
6	FW	(Algeria) ALG	Nabil Aït Fergane	23	0	21	0	2	0
7	FW	(Algeria) ALG	Mohamed El Amine Belmokhtar	23	5	22	5	1	0
8	FW	(Algeria) ALG	Mourad Benayad	25	11	24	11	1	0
	FW	(Algeria) ALG	Adel Benyettou	1	0	1	0	0	0
25	FW	(Algeria) ALG	Mohamed Derrag	15	2	15	2	0	0
	FW	(Algeria) ALG	Hasni Gharbi	1	0	1	0	0	0
9	FW	(Algeria) ALG	Abdelkader Meziane	19	1	17	1	2	0
15	FW	(Algeria) ALG	Féth-Allah Tahar	17	1	15	1	2	0
Players transferred out during the season

Last updated: 11 June 2018

=== Goalscorers ===
Includes all competitive matches. The list is sorted alphabetically by surname when total goals are equal.

No.	Nat.	Player	Pos.	L 1	AC	TOTAL
8	(Algeria)	Mourad Benayad	FW	12	0	12
7	(Algeria)	Mohamed El Amine Belmokhtar	FW	5	0	5
17	(Algeria)	Oussama Tebbi	DF	3	1	4
18	(Algeria)	Ishak Guebli	DF	3	0	3
27	(Algeria)	Belkacem Remache	DF	2	0	2
25	(Algeria)	Mohamed Derrag	FW	2	0	2
23	(Algeria)	Mohamed Amine Zidane	MF	2	0	2
	(Algeria)	Zahir Nemdil	MF	0	1	1
13	(Algeria)	Merouane Anane	MF	1	0	1
14	(Algeria)	Zineddine Mekkaoui	DF	1	0	1
15	(Algeria)	Féth-Allah Tahar	FW	1	0	1
10	(Algeria)	Houcine Riad Mazouni	MF	1	0	1
9	(Algeria)	Abdelkader Meziane	FW	1	0	1
Own Goals				0	0	0
Totals				34	2	36

== Squad list ==
As of 15 January 2017:

Note: Flags indicate national team as defined under FIFA eligibility rules; some limited exceptions apply. Players may hold more than one non-FIFA nationality.

No.	Pos.	Nation	Player
1	GK	ALG	Mustapha Zaidi
3	DF	ALG	Abdelkader Messaoudi
4	FW	ALG	Hocine Harrouche
5	FW	ALG	Walid Hellal
6	MF	ALG	Nabil Aït Fergane
7	FW	ALG	Mohamed El Amine Belmokhtar
8	MF	ALG	Mourad Benayad
9	FW	ALG	Abdelkader Meziane
10	MF	ALG	Houcine Riad Eddine Mazouni
11	DF	ALG	Karim Meddahi
12	FW	ALG	Hocine Benhaida
13	MF	ALG	Merouane Anane
14	DF	ALG	Zineddine Mekkaoui

No.	Pos.	Nation	Player
15	FW	ALG	Féth-Allah Tahar
16	GK	ALG	Hamza Bousseder
17	FW	ALG	Oussama Tebbi
18	DF	ALG	Ishak Guebli
20	MF	ALG	Fouad Allag
21	DF	ALG	Fouad Yagoub
23	DF	ALG	Mohamed Amine Zidane (captain)
25	FW	ALG	Mohamed Derrag
26	MF	ALG	Fayçal Moundji
27	DF	ALG	Belkacem Remache
29	FW	ALG	Fares Aggoun
30	GK	ALG	Islam Batchali

== Transfers ==
=== In ===
Date	Pos	Player	From club	Transfer fee	Source
1 July 2016	MF	(Algeria) Merouane Anane	CS Constantine	Undisclosed	
1 July 2016	MF	(Algeria) Fouad Allag	NA Hussein Dey	Undisclosed	
1 July 2016	FW	(Algeria) Walid Hellal	MC Oran	Undisclosed	
3 July 2016	FW	(Algeria) Mourad Benayad	NA Hussein Dey	Free transfer	
3 July 2016	DF	(Algeria) Ishak Guebli	NA Hussein Dey	Undisclosed	
4 July 2016	FW	(Algeria) Nabil Aït Fergane	JSM Béjaïa	Undisclosed	
5 July 2016	DF	(Algeria) Zineddine Mekkaoui	CS Constantine	Free transfer	
16 July 2016	MF	(Algeria) Zahir Nemdil	ES Sétif	Free transfer	
25 July 2016	DF	(Algeria) Belkacem Remache	CS Constantine	Free transfer	
30 July 2016	GK	(Algeria) Hamza Bousseder	Paradou AC	Undisclosed	
31 July 2016	DF	(Algeria) Abdelkader Messaoudi	MO Béjaïa	Free transfer	
5 January 2017	MF	(Algeria) Fayçal Moundji	JS Saoura	Undisclosed	
14 January 2017	MF	(Algeria) Hocine Harrouche	NA Hussein Dey	Undisclosed	
