= 2015–16 CS Constantine season =

CS Constantine
2015–16 season
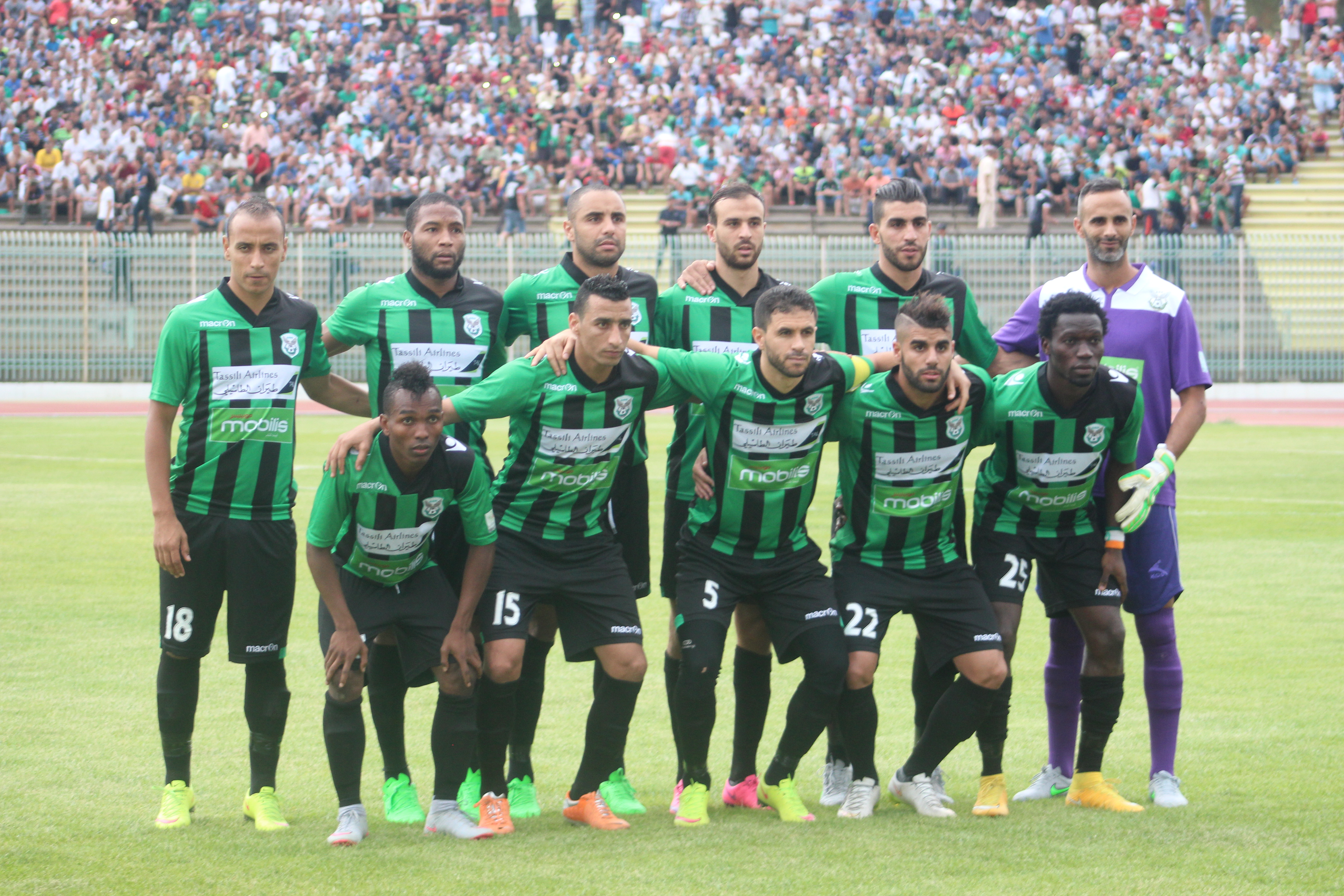
- CS Constantine 2015–16 with From Left to Right: Stand Up : Remache - Djeghbala - Aksas - Bencherifa - Boulemdaïs - Si Mohamed. Sitting Voavy - Boucherit - Bezzaz (C) - Djellilahine - Koné.
- Owner: ENTP (from 4 April 2016)
- Chairman: Mohamed Haddad
- Head coach: Hubert Velud (until 18 October 2015); Didier Gomes Da Rosa (from 5 November 2015)
- Stadium: Stade Mohamed Hamlaoui
- Ligue 1: 8th
- Algerian Cup: Round of 64
- Confederation Cup: Second round
- Top goalscorer: League: Yacine Bezzaz (7); All: Yacine Bezzaz (7)
Home colours	Away colours

In the 2015–16 season, CS Constantine competed in the Ligue 1 for the 20th season, as well as the Algerian Cup. The National Well Works Company (ENTP), regional leader in drilling whose head office is in Hassi Messaoud, also part of the giant oil group Sonatrach, will officially take over from Tassili Airlines. This change is motivated by the financial problems encountered by Tassili Airlines and ENTP with share capital of 14,800,000,000 DA, bought the majority of the shares of the SSPA/CS Constantine.

== Squad list ==
Players and squad numbers last updated on 18 November 2014.
Note: Flags indicate national team as has been defined under FIFA eligibility rules. Players may hold more than one non-FIFA nationality.

No.	Nat.	Name	Position	Date of Birth (Age)	Signed from
Goalkeepers
1	(Algeria)	Hamza Dahmane	GK	22 September 1990 (aged 24)	(Algeria) MC Oran
18	(Algeria)	Nadjib Ghoul	GK	12 September 1985 (aged 29)	(Algeria) ES Sétif
16	(Algeria)	Cédric Si Mohamed	GK	9 January 1985 (aged 30)	(Algeria) JSM Béjaïa
Defenders
7	(Algeria)	Hamid Bahri	RB	13 October 1989 (aged 25)	(Algeria) MO Béjaïa
20	(Algeria)	Farid Cheklam	CB	21 September 1984 (aged 30)	(Saudi Arabia) Najran SC
4	(Algeria)	Amine Aksas	CB	5 March 1983 (aged 32)	(Algeria) MC Alger
88	(Algeria)	Belkacem Remache	RB	12 October 1985 (aged 29)	(Algeria) JS Kabylie
28	(Algeria)	Amer Belakhdar	LB	20 January 1980 (aged 35)	(Algeria) JSM Béjaïa
17	(Algeria)	Mohamed Walid Bencherifa	LB	6 November 1988 (aged 26)	(Algeria) JS Kabylie
19	(Algeria)	Farid Mellouli	CB	7 July 1984 (aged 31)	(Saudi Arabia) Al-Qadisiyah FC
27	(Algeria)	Zineddine Mekkaoui	LB	10 January 1987 (aged 28)	(Algeria) JS Kabylie
15	(Algeria)	Sofyane Cherfa	CB	13 August 1984 (aged 31)	(Greece) Panthrakikos
Midfielders
26	(Algeria)	Sabri Gharbi	DM	26 May 1987 (aged 28)	(Algeria) MC Alger
10	(Algeria)	Mourad Meghni	AM	16 April 1984 (aged 31)	Unattached
13	(Algeria)	Abdelhak Sameur	DM	12 November 1990 (aged 24)	(Algeria) WA Tlemcen
29	(Algeria)	Merouane Anane	DM	31 May 1990 (aged 25)	(Algeria) CR Belouizdad
22	(Algeria)	Otman Djellilahine	AM	12 February 1987 (aged 28)	(Thailand) BEC Tero Sasana
24	(Algeria)	Toufik Guerabis	DM	31 July 1991 (aged 24)	(France) CSO Amnéville
15	(Algeria)	Antar Boucherit	DM	18 December 1983 (aged 31)	(Algeria) JS Saoura
10	(Algeria)	Mourad Meghni	AM	16 April 198 (aged 1817)	Unattached
Forwards
5	(Algeria)	Yacine Bezzaz	LM / RW / LW	10 July 1981 (aged 34)	(Algeria) MC Oran
14	(Algeria)	Hamza Boulemdaïs	ST	22 November 1982 (aged 32)	(Algeria) JS Kabylie
9	(Algeria)	Ahmed Messadia	ST	15 June 1986 (aged 29)	(Algeria) JS Kabylie
11	(Madagascar)	Paulin Voavy	LW	10 November 1987 (aged 27)	(France) AS Cannes
25	(Niger)	Koro Koné	ST	5 July 1989 (aged 26)	(France) Arles-Avignon
8	(Mauritania)	Bessam		5 December 1987 (aged 27)	(Algeria) JS Kabylie

== Competitions ==
=== Overview ===
Competition	Record								Started round	Final position / round	First match	Last match
Competition	G	W	D	L	GF	GA	GD	Win %	Started round	Final position / round	First match	Last match
Ligue 1	30	11	9	10	26	34	−8	36.67	—N/a	8th	15 August 2015	27 May 2015
Algerian Cup	1	0	0	1	0	1	−1	0.00	Round of 64		18 December 2015	
CAF Confederation Cup	4	2	0	2	6	5	+1	50.00	First round	Second round	13 March 2016	20 April 2016
Total	35	13	9	13	32	40	−8	37.14				

== League table ==
Pos	Team	Pld	W	D	L	GF	GA	GD	Pts
6	MO Béjaïa	30	11	11	8	33	23	+10	44 (Note: ES Sétif ahead of MO Béjaïa on head-to-head record: ESS–MOB 0–0, MOB–ESS 0–0.)
7	DRB Tadjenanet	30	11	10	9	32	30	+2	43
8	CS Constantine	30	11	9	10	26	32	−6	42
9	USM El Harrach	30	10	11	9	28	27	+1	41
10	MC Oran	30	9	13	8	40	35	+5	40 (Note: MC Oran ahead of NA Hussein Dey on head-to-head record: MCO–NAH 1–0, NAH–MCO 1–0.)

Updated to match(es) played on 27 May 2016. Source: DZFoot
Rules for classification: 1) points; 2) head-to-head points; 3) head-to-head goal difference; 4) goal difference; 5) total goals; 6) fairplay ranking; 7) playoff.

=== Results summary ===
Overall								Home						Away					
Pld	W	D	L	GF	GA	GD	Pts	W	D	L	GF	GA	GD	W	D	L	GF	GA	GD
30	11	9	10	26	32	−6	42	9	4	2	17	9	+8	2	5	8	9	23	−14

Last updated: 31 January 2015.
Source: Competitive matches

=== Results by round ===
Round	1	2	3	4	5	6	7	8	9	10	11	12	13	14	15	16	17	18	19	20	21	22	23	24	25	26	27	28	29	30
Ground	A	H	A	H	A	H	A	H	A	H	A	H	A	H	A	H	A	H	A	H	A	H	A	H	A	H	A	H	A	H
Result	W	W	L	D	L	L	W	L	D	L	D	L	D	L	W	L	D	W	W	D	W	L	D	D	W	D	W	L	W	W
Position	2	1	4	5	7	9	7	9	11	12	13	12	14	15	13	13	13	13	12	12	11	11	12	12	12	12	11	12	11	8

Updated to match(es) played on 31 January 2015. Source: Competitive matches
A = Away; H = Home; W = Win; D = Draw; L = Loss

=== Matches ===
Win Draw Loss

15 August 2015 Round 1	JS Kabylie	0–1	CS Constantine	Tizi Ouzou
18:00		Report; Live TV: None	72' Voavy	Stadium: Stade 1er Novembre 1954; Referee: Ghorbal, Seradj, Charchar

22 August 2015 Round 2	CS Constantine	2–1	MC Oran	Constantine
18:00	Aksas 25'; Bezzaz 57'	Report	39' Za'abia	Stadium: Stade Mohamed Hamlaoui; Referee: Bekouassa, Bounoua, Rachedi

29 August 2015 Round 3	ES Sétif	2–1	CS Constantine	Sétif
17:40	Korbiaa 37'; Benyettou 60'	Report; Live TV: Algérie 3	19' Koné	Stadium: Stade 8 Mai 1945; Referee: Boukhalfa, Itchiali, Zerhouni

12 September 2015 Round 4	MO Béjaïa	0–0	CS Constantine	Béjaïa
17:00		Report; Live TV: TV Tamazight 4 / Canal Algérie		Stadium: Stade de l'Unité Maghrébine; Referee: Amalou, Azrine, Arab

19 September 2015 Round 5	CS Constantine	0–2	USM Alger	Constantine
17:00		Report; Live TV: Algérie 3	60' Andria; 80' (pen.) Aoudia	Stadium: Stade Mohamed Hamlaoui, Referee: Mial, Semsoum, Idir

28 September 2015 Round 6	CR Belouizdad	2–0	CS Constantine	Belouizdad
18:00	Yahia-Chérif 35'; Feham 88'	Report; Live TV: None		Stadium: Stade 20 Août 1955; Referee: Benouza, Mekkaoui, Omari

2 October 2015 Round 7	CS Constantine	2–0	USM El Harrach	Constantine
18:00	Djellilahine 36'; Boulemdaïs 63'	Report; Live TV: None		Stadium: Stade Mohamed Hamlaoui; Referee: Benbraham, Alaoua, Yahi

17 October 2015 Round 8	JS Saoura	4–1	CS Constantine	Béchar
18:00	Merbah 21'; Belkheir 41'; Djallit 55'; Hamia 67'	Report; Live TV: None	88' Sameur	Stadium: Stade 20 Août 1955; Referee: Bachir, Bouali, Hadj Saïd

23 October 2015 Round 9	CS Constantine	1–1	USM Blida	Constantine
18:00	Moulaye 6'	Report; Live TV: TV Tamazight 4	54' (pen.) Noubli	Stadium: Stade Mohamed Hamlaoui; Referee: Amalou, Azrine, Bounoua

30 October 2015 Round 10	ASM Oran	4–0	CS Constantine	Oran
15:00	Elghoumari 20', 53', 56'; Bentiba 90+3' (pen.)	Report; Live TV: beIN Sports / TV Tamazight 4		Stadium: Stade Habib Bouakeul; Referee: Arab, Bioud, Brahim

6 November 2015 Round 11	CS Constantine	1–1	RC Relizane	Constantine
16:00	Bezzaz 85' (pen.)	Report; Live TV: None	31' Tiaïba	Stadium: Stade Mohamed Hamlaoui; Referee: Boukoussa, Rachedi, Naam

21 November 2015 Round 12	DRB Tadjenanet	1–0	CS Constantine	Tadjenanet
15:00	Hadef 28'	Report; Live TV: Algérie 3		Stadium: Lahoua Smaïl Stadium; Referee: Benouza, Oumari, Ayad

28 November 2015 Round 13	CS Constantine	1–1	MC Alger	Constantine
16:00	Bezzaz 50'	Report; Live TV: Algérie 3	76' Karaoui	Stadium: Stade Mohamed Hamlaoui; Referee: Saïdi, Etchiali, Miraoui

10 December 2015 Round 14	NA Hussein Dey	1–0	CS Constantine	Belouizdad
17:00	Gasmi 49'	Report; Live TV: None		Stadium: Stade 20 Août 1955; Referee: Boukhalfa, Zerhouni, Benali

26 December 2015 Round 15	CS Constantine	1–0	RC Arbaâ	Constantine
16:00	Bezzaz 20' (pen.)	Report; Live TV: None		Stadium: Stade Mohamed Hamlaoui; Referee: Amalou

16 January 2016 Round 16	CS Constantine	0–1	JS Kabylie	Constantine
16:00		Report; Live TV: Canal Algérie	60' Ferhani	Stadium: Stade Mohamed Hamlaoui; Referee: Aouina, Benaïssa, Kechida

22 January 2016 Round 17	MC Oran	1–1	CS Constantine	Oran
16:00	Berramla 11'	Report; Live TV: Canal Algérie	56' Boulemdaïs	Stadium: Stade Ahmed Zabana; Referee: Helalchi, Azrine, Doulache

29 January 2016 Round 18	CS Constantine	1–0	ES Sétif	Constantine
16:00	Sameur 46'	Report; Live TV: TV Tamazight 4		Stadium: Stade Mohamed Hamlaoui; Referee: Boukouassa, Bounouioua, Rachedi

5 February 2016 Round 19	CS Constantine	1–0	MO Béjaïa	Constantine
16:00	Bezzaz 48' (pen.)	Report; Live TV: Canal Algérie		Stadium: Stade Mohamed Hamlaoui; Referee: Ghorbal, Itchiali, Hadj Said

12 February 2016 Round 20	USM Alger	1–1	CS Constantine	Bologhine
18:00	Boudebouda 82'	Report; Live TV: None	48' Voavy	Stadium: Stade Omar Hammadi; Referee: Brahimi, Semsoum, Idir

27 February 2016 Round 21	CS Constantine	2–1	CR Belouizdad	Constantine
16:00	Bencherifa 18'; Bezzaz 40' (pen.)	Report; Live TV: None	72' Yahia-Chérif	Stadium: Stade Mohamed Hamlaoui; Attendance: 0 (close doors); Referee: S. Aouina, F. Aouina F, Bennaïssa

5 March 2016 Round 22	USM El Harrach	1–0	CS Constantine	El Harrach
16:00	Younes 22'	Report; Live TV: None		Stadium: Stade 1er Novembre 1954; Referee: Arab, Biod, Maghlout

25 March 2016 Round 23	CS Constantine	1–1	JS Saoura	Constantine
18:00	Gharbi 23'	Report; Live TV: None	90+5'	Stadium: Stade Mohamed Hamlaoui; Referee: Mial, Allaoua, Yahi

2 April 2016 Round 24	USM Blida	0–0	CS Constantine	Blida
16:00		Report; Live TV: None		Stadium: Stade Frères Brakni; Referee: Boukhalfa, Zerhouni, Bourrechou

15 April 2016 Round 25	CS Constantine	2–0	ASM Oran	Constantine
16:00	Voavy 10'; Boulemdaïs 86'	Report; Live TV: None		Stadium: Stade Mohamed Hamlaoui; Referee: Ibrahim, Boulekrinet, Boulekrinet

23 April 2016 Round 26	RC Relizane	2–2	CS Constantine	Relizane
16:00	Kherbache 40'; Rabhi 51'	Report; Live TV: None	34' Bencherifa; 38' (pen.) Bezzaz	Stadium: Stade Tahar Zoughari; Referee: Halalchi, Azrine, Doulache

30 April 2016 Round 27	CS Constantine	1–0	DRB Tadjenanet	Constantine
16:00	Aksas 55'	Report; Live TV: TV Tamazight 4 / Algérie 3		Stadium: Stade Mohamed Hamlaoui; Referee: Brahimi, Bounoua, Bourouba

13 May 2016 Round 28	MC Alger	3–0	CS Constantine	Bologhine
17:30	Derrardja 21'; Gourmi 44'; Boucherit 90+4'	Report; Live TV: beIN Sports / Al Kass Sports / Algérie 3		Stadium: Stade Omar Hammadi; Referee: Ghorbal, Etchali, Hadj Saïd

20 May 2016 Round 29	CS Constantine	1–0	NA Hussein Dey	Constantine
17:30	Ahmed 28'	Report; Live TV: None		Stadium: Stade Mohamed Hamlaoui; Referee: Boukhalfa, Zerhouni, Benali

27 May 2016 Round 30	RC Arbaâ	1–2	CS Constantine	Larbaâ
17:30	Bakir 6'	Report; Live TV: None	89' Meghni; 90' Voavy	Stadium: Stade Ismaïl Makhlouf; Referee: Guettoum, Benaissa, Aouina

== Algerian Cup ==
18 December 2015 Round of 64	MC El Eulma	1–0 (a.e.t.)	CS Constantine	El Eulma
16:00	Madani 116'	Report		Stadium: Stade Messaoud Zougar; Referee: Mial, Salaouadji et Bourouba

== Confederation Cup ==
=== First round ===
13 March 2016 first leg	Nasarawa United (Nigeria)	1–0	(Algeria) CS Constantine	Abuja
14:00 UTC+1	Azango 84'	Report		Stadium: National Stadium; Referee: Jerry Yekeh (Liberia)

19 March 2016 Second leg	CS Constantine (Algeria)	4–1	(Nigeria) Nasarawa United	Constantine
18:00 UTC+1	Bezzaz 45+1' (pen.); Messadia 76'; Meghni 78'; Voavy 83'	Report	67' Bature	Stadium: Stade Mohamed Hamlaoui; Attendance: 30,000; Referee: Yakhouba Keita (Guinea)

=== Second round ===
9 April 2016 first leg	CS Constantine (Algeria)	1–0	(Egypt) Misr Lel Makkasa	Constantine
18:00 UTC+1	Meghni 85'	Report		Stadium: Stade Mohamed Hamlaoui; Attendance: 35,000; Referee: Mohamed Ragab Omar (Libya)

20 April 2016 Second leg	Misr Lel Makkasa (Egypt)	3–1	(Algeria) CS Constantine	Faiyum
18:00 UTC+2	Poku 13'; Gaber 50', 83'	Report	Voavy 76'	Stadium: Faiyum Stadium; Referee: Bouchaïb El Ahrach (Morocco)

== Squad information ==
=== Playing statistics ===
No.	Pos	Nat	Player	Total		Ligue 1		Algerian Cup		Confederation Cup	
No.	Pos	Nat	Player	Apps	Goals	Apps	Goals	Apps	Goals	Apps	Goals
Goalkeepers
1	GK	(Algeria) ALG	Hamza Dahmane	0	0	0	0	0	0	0	0
18	GK	(Algeria) ALG	Nadjib Ghoul	6	0	4	0	0	0	2	0
16	GK	(Algeria) ALG	Cédric Si Mohamed	29	0	26	0	1	0	2	0
Defenders
7	DF	(Algeria) ALG	Hamid Bahri	20	1	16	1	0	0	4	0
20	DF	(Algeria) ALG	Farid Cheklam	17	0	12	0	1	0	4	0
4	DF	(Algeria) ALG	Amine Aksas	17	2	15	2	0	0	2	0
88	DF	(Algeria) ALG	Belkacem Remache	21	0	19	0	1	0	1	0
28	DF	(Algeria) ALG	Amer Belakhdar	6	0	6	0	0	0	0	0
17	DF	(Algeria) ALG	Mohamed Walid Bencherifa	31	2	26	2	1	0	4	0
19	DF	(Algeria) ALG	Farid Mellouli	11	0	11	0	0	0	0	0
27	DF	(Algeria) ALG	Zineddine Mekkaoui	14	0	12	0	1	0	1	0
26	DF	(Algeria) ALG	Sabri Gharbi	21	1	16	1	1	0	4	0
15	DF	(Algeria) ALG	Sofyane Cherfa	14	0	14	0	0	0	0	0
Midfielders
10	MF	(Algeria) ALG	Mourad Meghni	14	3	11	1	0	0	3	2
13	MF	(Algeria) ALG	Abdelhak Sameur	29	2	25	2	1	0	3	0
29	MF	(Algeria) ALG	Merouane Anane	14	0	12	0	0	0	2	0
22	MF	(Algeria) ALG	Otman Djellilahine	23	1	20	1	1	0	2	0
5	MF	(Algeria) ALG	Yacine Bezzaz	32	8	27	7	1	0	4	1
Forwards
14	FW	(Algeria) ALG	Hamza Boulemdaïs	30	3	28	3	0	0	2	0
9	FW	(Algeria) ALG	Ahmed Messadia	23	1	19	0	1	0	3	1
11	FW	(Madagascar) MAD	Paulin Voavy	28	5	24	3	0	0	4	2
25	FW	(Niger) NIG	Koro Issa Ahmed Koné	14	1	10	1	1	0	3	0
24	FW	(Algeria) ALG	Toufik Guerabis	30	0	25	0	1	0	4	0
8	FW	(Mauritania) MTN	Cheikh Moulaye Ahmed	21	2	18	2	1	0	2	0
Players transferred out during the season
	MF	(Algeria) ALG	Antar Boucherit	10	0	10	0	0	0	0	0
	DF	(Algeria) ALG	Abdelmalek Djeghbala	9	0	9	0	0	0	0	0

Source: Competitions

== Transfers ==
=== In ===
Date	Pos	Player	From club	Transfer fee	Source
21 June 2015	DF	(Algeria) Amine Aksas	MC Alger	Free transfer	
21 June 2015	DF	(Algeria) Farid Cheklam	(Saudi Arabia) Najran SC	Free transfer	
21 June 2015	DF	(Algeria) Zineddine Mekkaoui	JS Kabylie	Free transfer	
21 June 2015	DF	(Algeria) Sabri Gharbi	MC Alger	Free transfer	
25 June 2015	MF	(Algeria) Yacine Bezzaz	MC Oran	Free transfer	
15 July 2015	FW	(Ivory Coast) Koro Issa Ahmed Koné	(France) Dijon FCO	Free transfer	
11 January 2016	DF	(Algeria) Sofyane Cherfa	(Greece) Panthrakikos	Free transfer	
13 January 2016	DF	(Algeria) Farid Mellouli	(Saudi Arabia) Al-Qadisiyah FC	Free transfer	
