= Yasa (disambiguation) =

Yasa, Yassa, or variants thereof, may refer to:

- Yasa, a Buddhist bhikkhu
- Yasa language, a Bantu language
- Cyclone Yasa (2020), tropical weather system
- YASA Limited, a British manufacturer of electric motors and generators
- Yassa, a legal code created by Genghis Khan
- Yassa (food), a spicy dish popular in Western Africa

== People with the surname ==
- Rabah Yassa, Algerian footballer
- Ramzi Yassa (born 1948), Egyptian pianist

== See also ==
- Yasak, a fur tax used in Imperial Russia
- Yasa'ur, the great-great-grandson of Chagatai Khan
