= Kasri =

Kasri is a surname. Notable people with the surname include:

- Djaïd Kasri (born 1987), French-Algerian footballer
- Melissa Kasri (born 1998), Algerian volleyball player
- Skander Kasri (born 1958), Tunisian football manager
- Hamid El Kasri (born 1961), Moroccan musician

== See also ==
- Kasri Orifon (village), village in Uzbekistan
