= Aley =

City in central Lebanon

Aley عاليه
- City
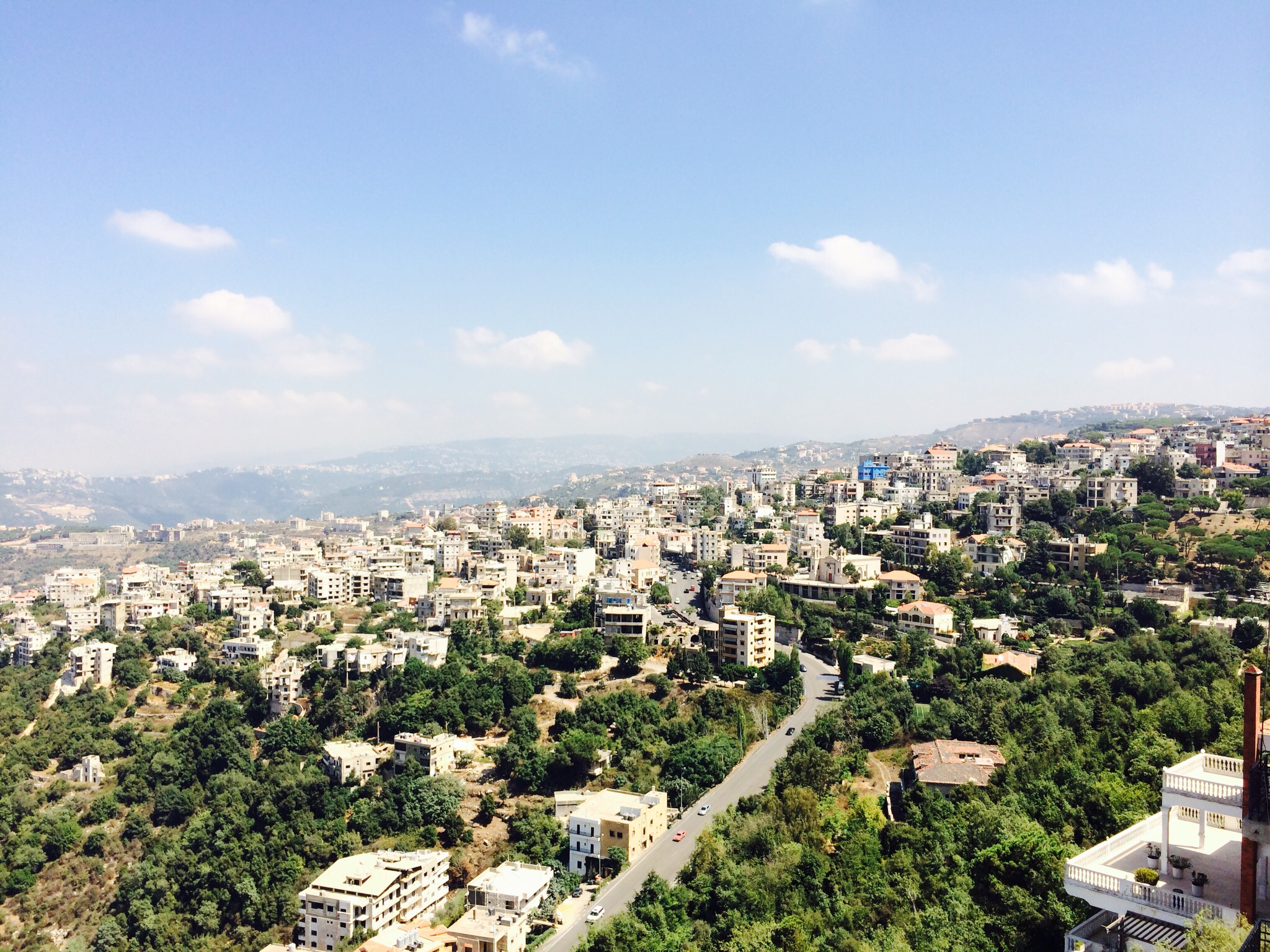
- Souk Aley

- Location in Lebanon
- Coordinates: 33°48′29″N 35°36′45″E
- Country: Lebanon
- Governorate: Mount Lebanon Governorate
- District: Aley District

Government
  - Mayor: Wajdi Mrad
  - Deputy Mayor: Samir Khoury

Area
  - City: 9.54 km^{2} (3.68 sq mi)
  - Metro: 33 km^{2} (13 sq mi)
- Elevation: 600–950 m (1,970–3,120 ft)
- Highest elevation: 950 m (3,120 ft)
- Lowest elevation: 600 m (2,000 ft)

Population
  - City: 75,000
  - Density: 7,900/km^{2} (20,000/sq mi)
- Time zone: UTC+2 (EET)
  - Summer (DST): +3

Aley (Arabic: عاليه) is a major city in central Lebanon. It is the capital of the Aley District and fourth largest city in Lebanon.

The city is located on Mount Lebanon, 15km uphill from Beirut on the freeway to Damascus. Aley has the nickname "Bride of the Summer resorts" (Note: عروس المصايف) due to its cooler climate during the summer touristic season. Other nicknames include "Capital of the Mountain: (Note: عاصمة الجبل) and the "Lebanese City of Fog" (Note: مدينة الضباب), due to its mountain foggy weather.

== History ==
Aley gained prominence upon the completion of the Beirut–Damascus Railway in the mid-1890s. The railroad provided the residents of Beirut easy means of transportation to the mountains, and this made Aley a popular destination to spend the summer months and enjoy its pleasant climate. It was the site of a serious accident on 12 April 1904, when part of the locomotive exploded and the train fell backwards down the 7% grade, killing 8 and seriously injuring another 21.

The city was for a while the summer capital of the Ottoman governors of Mount Lebanon. Kamil Pasha made Aley his capital and organized a Diwan, later used by Djemal Pasha where he executed a large number of Lebanese and Syrian Arab nationalists who sought independence from the Ottomans. Also, a Jewish community once frequented this multi-cultural city, and they maintained a synagogue in Souk Aley, but it has since been abandoned. In 2001, the municipality of Aley began renovating the downtown area, especially its historic souk, and the city quickly revived its role in Lebanon's tourism.

=== Etymology ===
The word "Aley" means "high place" in Arabic and in Aramaic, referring to the city's high altitude above sea level (from 600m up to 950m).

== Tourism ==
Aley is a major tourist destination in Lebanon and the Middle East. Its location and climate made it a favorable venue for shopping and dining, especially for wealthy Arabs from Persian Gulf states. This resort city with its increasing number of tourists and visitors has become the most flourishing resort in Mount Lebanon, and thus has garnered its historical name as "The Bride of Summers". The "Souk Aley" is a relatively long historical boulevard lined with palm trees; there are numerous redroofed stone houses erected on the east side of the street while several street cafes, outdoor restaurants, and nightlife pubs occupy its western side. In addition to these, there are tens of antique shops and retail boutiques along the street, which forms the heart of Aley. Aley also hosts a well-known casino and many public swimming pools like the Piscine Aley, Country Club and Heritage. There's also many hotels like the Highland, Regent Palace and the Golden Tulip. There's also malls in Aley like the Aley Center and Aley Mall and many Lebanese and international restaurants.

Moreover, the Balakin street (terras) is a observatory spot to overview a large part of the city all the way down to a triangular shape of Beirut and the Mediterranean Sea going up left to the 2600 meters high summit of Sanin Mountain. A panoramic view that can rarely be seen anywhere in the world.

The city also hosts 3 artistic symposiums in Piscine and Ras el Jabal neighborhoods. These symposiums contain artistic sculptures performed in the beginning of the century by a big number of Lebanese and international artists that added a cultural charm to the beauty of Aley.

In 1910 Aley received the founders of the American University of Beirut (AUB), they built castles and lived there for several years. During the 1960s several artists performed in the hotels and the casinos of Aley such as Umm Kulthum, Mohammed Abdel Wahab and Farid Al Atrash.

Aley is the capital of the Aley District and it has 18 municipality members. In 2009 the municipality joined the Yasa in a safety program to reduce the rate of accidents.

== Climate ==
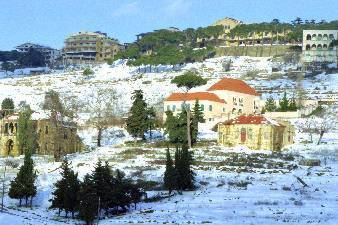
Aley in the winter.

Aley has a hot-summer Mediterranean climate, with warm and rain less summers, mild autumns and springs, and cool rainy winters. Snow can occasionally fall in colder years. The city is known in Lebanon for its often foggy weather.

Climate data for Aley
Month	Jan	Feb	Mar	Apr	May	Jun	Jul	Aug	Sep	Oct	Nov	Dec	Year
Mean daily maximum °C (°F)	14.8 (58.6)	15.7 (60.3)	17.7 (63.9)	20.1 (68.2)	23.2 (73.8)	25.9 (78.6)	27.8 (82.0)	28.5 (83.3)	27.2 (81.0)	25.2 (77.4)	21.1 (70.0)	17.0 (62.6)	22.0 (71.6)
Daily mean °C (°F)	12.9 (55.2)	14.0 (57.2)	15.6 (60.1)	17.4 (63.3)	20.7 (69.3)	23.5 (74.3)	25.4 (77.7)	26.2 (79.2)	24.9 (76.8)	23.2 (73.8)	19.0 (66.2)	15.2 (59.4)	19.8 (67.6)
Mean daily minimum °C (°F)	11.5 (52.7)	10.7 (51.3)	12.4 (54.3)	15.0 (59.0)	18.3 (64.9)	21.3 (70.3)	23.3 (73.9)	24.3 (75.7)	23.0 (73.4)	21.0 (69.8)	17.2 (63.0)	13.6 (56.5)	17.6 (63.7)
Average precipitation mm (inches)	156.0 (6.14)	143.0 (5.63)	135.2 (5.32)	87.1 (3.43)	41.6 (1.64)	0.4 (0.02)	0.3 (0.01)	0.4 (0.02)	2.3 (0.09)	46.8 (1.84)	65.0 (2.56)	128.7 (5.07)	806.8 (31.76)
Average precipitation days (≥ 0.1 mm)	12	11	11	7	4	1	0	0	1	4	5	10	66
Source: worldweatheronline

== Demographics ==
Religion in Aley (2014)
1. Druze (67.3%)
2. Greek Orthodox (12.0%)
3. Other Christians, mostly Melkite Catholic and Maronite Catholic (16.6%)
4. Other Religions mostly Islam with a minority of Jews (4.09%)

In 2014, Druze made up 67.26% and Christians made up 28.65% of registered voters in Aley. 12.04% of registered voters were Greek Orthodox.

Aley is characterized by having a very wide variety of residents, representing all the Lebanese inclusively. There are estimated to be 75,000 people living in the city of Aley.

The permanent residents of Aley are predominantly Druze people. It can be claimed to be the city with the largest Druze population in the World. While the metropolitan city of Aley is mostly made up of Druze with a large minority of Christians (~30%), the greater Aley area is predominantly Christian with towns like Kahale, Bsous, Bhamdoun and Souk El Gharb being mostly Christian.

The city has also seen a massive influx of Syrian refugees since 2011.

== Culture and education ==
The city contains 15 schools, 5 public and 10 private. The largest, oldest, and most important of these schools is The Universal College in Aley (UCA) which is considered one of the best schools in the country. It was built in 1907 by Mr. Shebl Khoury.

There are also 2 universities in the city: the Lebanese University-Faculty of Economic Science and Business Administrations, and the Modern University of Business and Science (MUBS). There's also the University of Balamand located in Souk Al Gharb in the suburbia of Aley as well as the American University of Science and Technology (AUST) located in the nearby town of Bhamdoun.

Aley has four hospitals: The National Hospital of Aley (30 beds), Al Iman Hospital (52 beds), Al Chehayeb Hospital (20 beds) and Al Ouyoun Hospital, which specializes in ophthalmology.

== Sport ==
Akhaa Ahli Aley FC, a football club playing in the Lebanese Premier League, is based in Aley.

== See also ==
- Druze in Lebanon
