= The Universal College in Aley =

Universal College - Aley
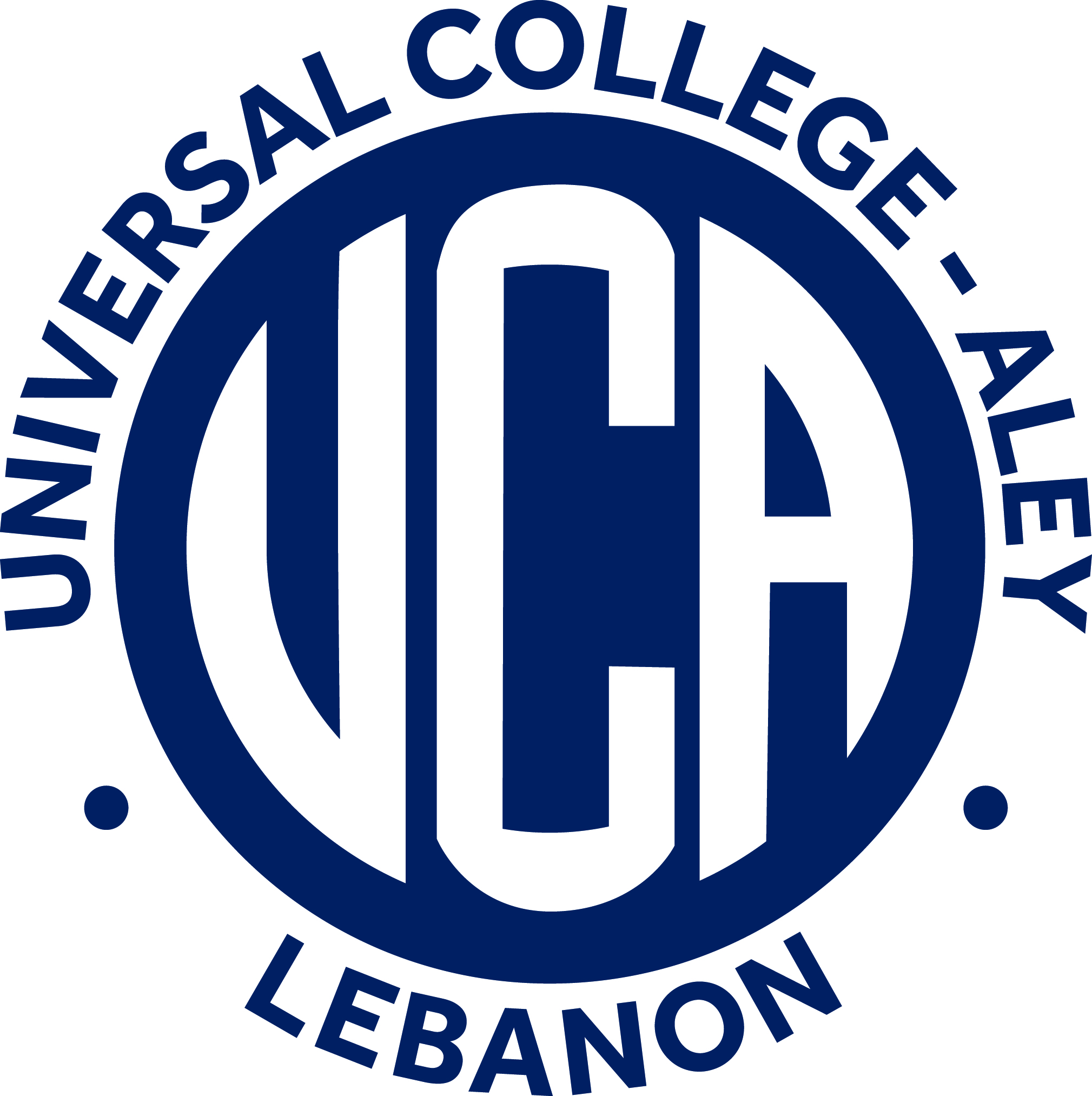
- Aley, Lebanon

Information
- Type: Private
- Established: 1907
- Director: Rola Malaeb
- Grades: K–12
- Website: www.universalcollege.edu.lb
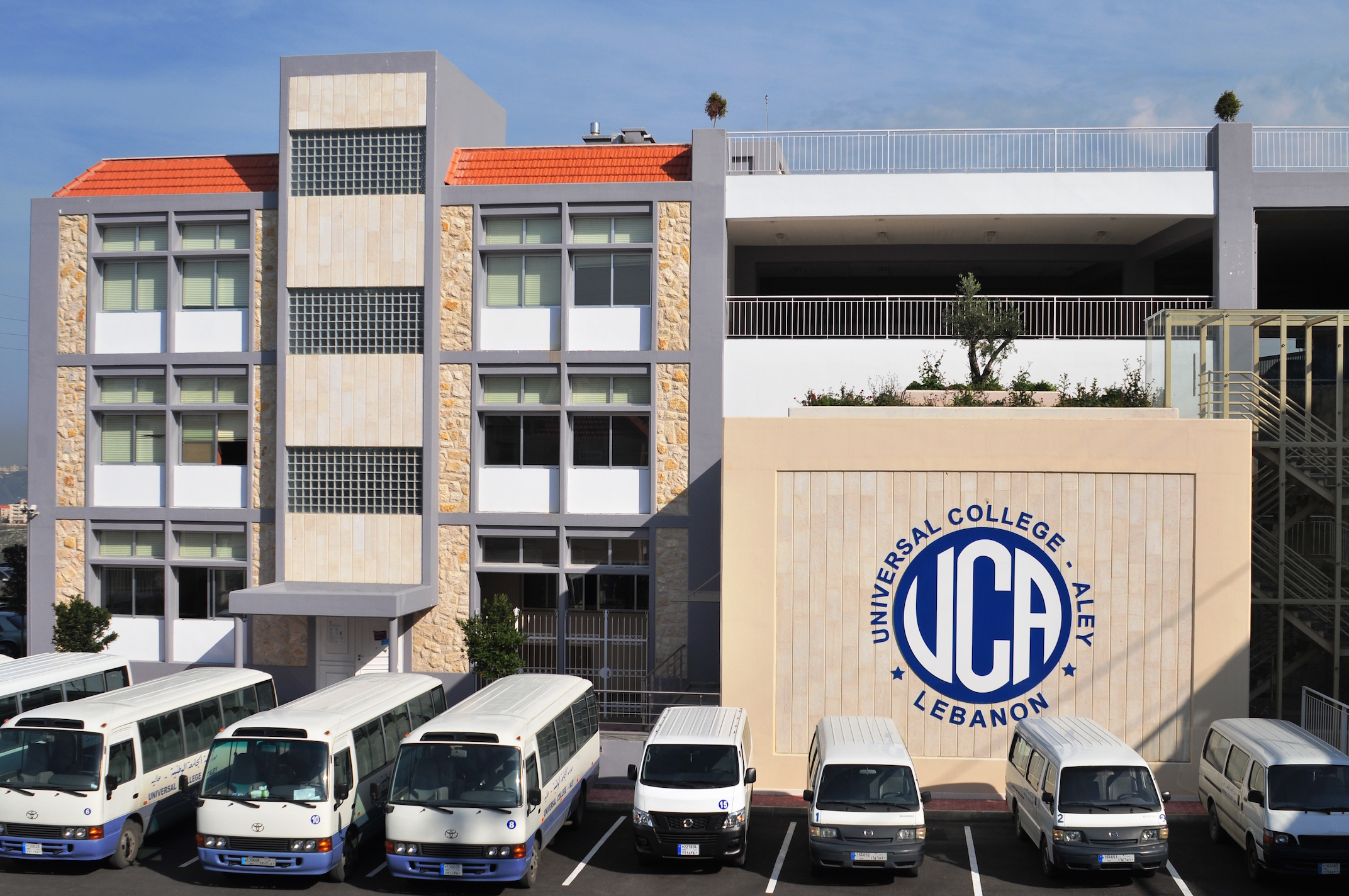
- Universal College - Aley

The Universal College - Aley (UCA; Al - Jamiaa Al Wataniya) was founded in 1907 and operated as a K–12 institution for many decades as an independent college preparatory school.

In 1983, UCA was forced to close its doors to students due to the impact of many years of political unrest in Lebanon and the resulting war damage to the campus and the surrounding areas. But after things stabilized, a new Universal College in Aley opened its doors to students for the first time since 1983 on October 4, 2001 as a member of the Esol Education.

== Accreditation ==
The school is privately owned and approved to operate by the Lebanese Ministry of Education.

== Curriculum ==
UCA is an independent college preparatory school that offers two distinct academic tracks, leading to either the Lebanese Baccalaureate or the American Diploma. Instruction, with the exception of Arabic, French, and Arabic Social Studies, is in English. American textbooks are used in all core academic programs, and academic support is provided to students in the form of tutoring services and second language instruction.

== Languages Offered ==
- English
- Arabic

== Memberships ==
- European Council of International Schools (ECIS)
- National Honor Society (NHS)
- Mediterranean Association of International Schools (MAIS)
- Near-east South Asia Association of International Schools (NESA)
- Central Eastern European Schools Association (CEESA)
