= Bogy (footballer) =

Egyptian footballer (born 1989)

Personal information
- Full name: Ahmed Fathi Mohamed; Mahmoud Mohamed
- Date of birth: January 28, 1989 (age 37)
- Place of birth: Ismailia, Egypt
- Height: 1.87 m (6 ft 2 in)
- Position: Striker

Youth career
- El Qanah

Senior career*
Years	Team	Apps	(Gls)
2008–2009	El Qanah		
2009–2011	Zamalek	3	(0)
2011	→ Misr Lel Makkasa (loan)	16	(5)
2012–2013	El Qanah	25	(10)
2013–2013	Al-Talaba	18	(5)
2014	CR Belouizdad	12	(1)
2014–2015	Tersana	16	(9)
2015–2017	El Qanah	29	(17)
2017–2018	Al Fanar		
2018–2019	Dinamo Vranje	0	(0)

International career
2009	Egypt U-20	4	(2)
- * Club domestic league appearances and goals as of 00:00, August 1, 2014 (EST)

Ahmed Fathi Mohamed Mahmoud Mohamed, more commonly known as Bogy, (born January 30, 1989, in Ismailia, Egypt) is an Egyptian Former footballer who played as a striker. He shares a nickname with Egyptian wrestler Mohamed Abdelfatah.

An Egyptian youth international, Bogy was a member of the Egypt national under-20 football team at the 2009 FIFA U-20 World Cup, which Egypt hosted.

== Club career ==
In January 2014, Bogy signed an 18-month contract with Algerian club CR Belouizdad. On January 18, he made his debut for CRB, coming on as a second-half substitute in a league match against RC Arbaâ. At the end of the season, he was released by the club.

== International career ==
Bogy currently plays for the Egyptian U-23 national youth team. He took part in all Egypt's matches the 2009 FIFA U-20 World Cup that was hosted by Egypt from September 25 to October 16.

Bogy's highlight in the 2009 FIFA U-20 World Cup was scoring a double versus Italy after coming off the bench in the second-half.
