= Otman Djellilahine =

Algerian footballer (born 1987)

Personal information
- Date of birth: 12 February 1987 (age 39)
- Place of birth: Carcassonne, France
- Height: 1.72 m (5 ft 8 in)
- Position: Midfielder

Team information
- Current team: Gobelins

Senior career*
Years	Team	Apps	(Gls)
2006–2010	Nîmes Olympique	23	(1)
2008–2009	→ Martigues (loan)	32	(2)
2010–2014	Créteil	129	(12)
2014	BEC Tero Sasana	14	(2)
2015–2016	CS Constantine	30	(1)
2019–	Gobelins	7	(1)

International career
2004	Algeria U20	8	(2)
- * Club domestic league appearances and goals as of 18:18, 24 October 2019 (UTC)

Otman Djellilahine (born 12 February 1987 in Carcassonne, France) is a footballer who plays for Championnat National 1 side FC Gobelins.

== International career ==
In 2004, France-born Djellilahine was called up by the Algerian Under-20 National Team for a week-long training camp capped off with a match against amateur side Le Grau du Roi.
