= Choukri Ouaïl =

Algerian footballer

Personal information
- Full name: Choukri Ouaïl
- Position: Midfielder

Senior career*
Years	Team	Apps	(Gls)
–2011	JSM Chéraga	-	(-)
2011	JS Kabylie	9	(0)
- * Club domestic league appearances and goals as of 00:00, 9 July 2011 (UTC)

Choukri Ouaïl is an Algerian footballer. He is currently unattached, after last playing for JS Kabylie in the Algerian Ligue Professionnelle 1.

== Club career ==
On January 30, 2011, Ouaïl signed a two-year contract with JS Kabylie, joining them on a transfer from JSM Chéraga. The transfer fee was 1 million Algerian dinars. On May 10, 2011, Ouaïl made his debut for the club in a league match against AS Khroub, replacing Nassim Oussalah in the 71st minute. He was released by the club at the end of the season.
