= Deen Sheriff Mohammed =

Ghanaian international football player

Sheriff Deen
Personal information
- Full name: Sheriff Deen
- Date of birth: March 6, 1991 (age 35)
- Place of birth: Accra, Ghana
- Height: 1.90 m (6 ft 3 in)
- Position: Striker

Youth career
- FC Maamobi Midjtylland

Senior career*
Years	Team	Apps	(Gls)
2007–2008	Accra Hearts of Oak	14	(5)
2008–2009	Great Olympics	18	(10)
2009–2010	Midjtylland FC - Denmark	14	(5)
2010–2011	Dhaka Abahani	24	(17)
2011–2012	CR Belouizdad	5	(0)
2012–2013	Heart of Lions		
2013–2014	International Allies		
2015–2016	Dashen Beer	17	(9)
2017–2018	Lusaka Dynamo	17	(7)

International career
2009–2011	Ghana U-23		
2012	Ghana	1	(0)
- * Club domestic league appearances and goals

Sheriff Deen (often erroneously reported as Sheriff Mohammed Deen) is a Ghanaian international football player.

== Career ==
Sheriff played for Accra Hearts of Oak from 2007 to 2008. Sheriff Deen played 17 matches and scored 8 goals for CR Belouizda (Algeria) in 2011, and in 2014 was on loan to a Ghanaian club called Inter Allies FC and currently in top form. He has been a dynamic player and was on top form for Lusaka Dynamo in Zambia 2017-2018 football season.

== International ==
He was 2009 member of the Ghana national under-23 football team until 2011. On 17. November 2012 was first time called for the Black Stars (Ghana national football team).
