= Rabah Yassa =

Algerian footballer

Personal information
- Full name: Rabah Yassa
- Place of birth: Algeria
- Position: Midfielder

Team information
- Current team: JS Kabylie

Youth career
- –2006: USM Draâ Ben Khedda
- 2006–2011: JS Kabylie

Senior career*
Years	Team	Apps	(Gls)
2011–	JS Kabylie	2	(0)

International career
2010	Algeria U20	-	(-)
- * Club domestic league appearances and goals as of 00:00, 9 July 2011 (UTC)

Rabah Yassa is an Algerian football player. He is currently playing for JS Kabylie in the Algerian Ligue Professionnelle 1.

== Club career ==
Yassa began his career in the junior ranks of USM Draâ Ben Khedda. In 2006, he joined JS Kabylie. On July 1, 2011, Yassa made his professional debut for JS Kabylie as an 89th-minute substitute in a league match against MC El Eulma.

== International career ==
In February 2010, Yassa was called up to the Algerian Under-20 National Team for a tournament in Dubai.
