= Yasa =

Disciple of Gautama Buddha

Venerable Yasa

Personal life
- Born: 6th century BCE Varanasi, India
- Occupation: bhikkhu

Religious life
- Religion: Buddhism

Senior posting
- Teacher: Gautama Buddha

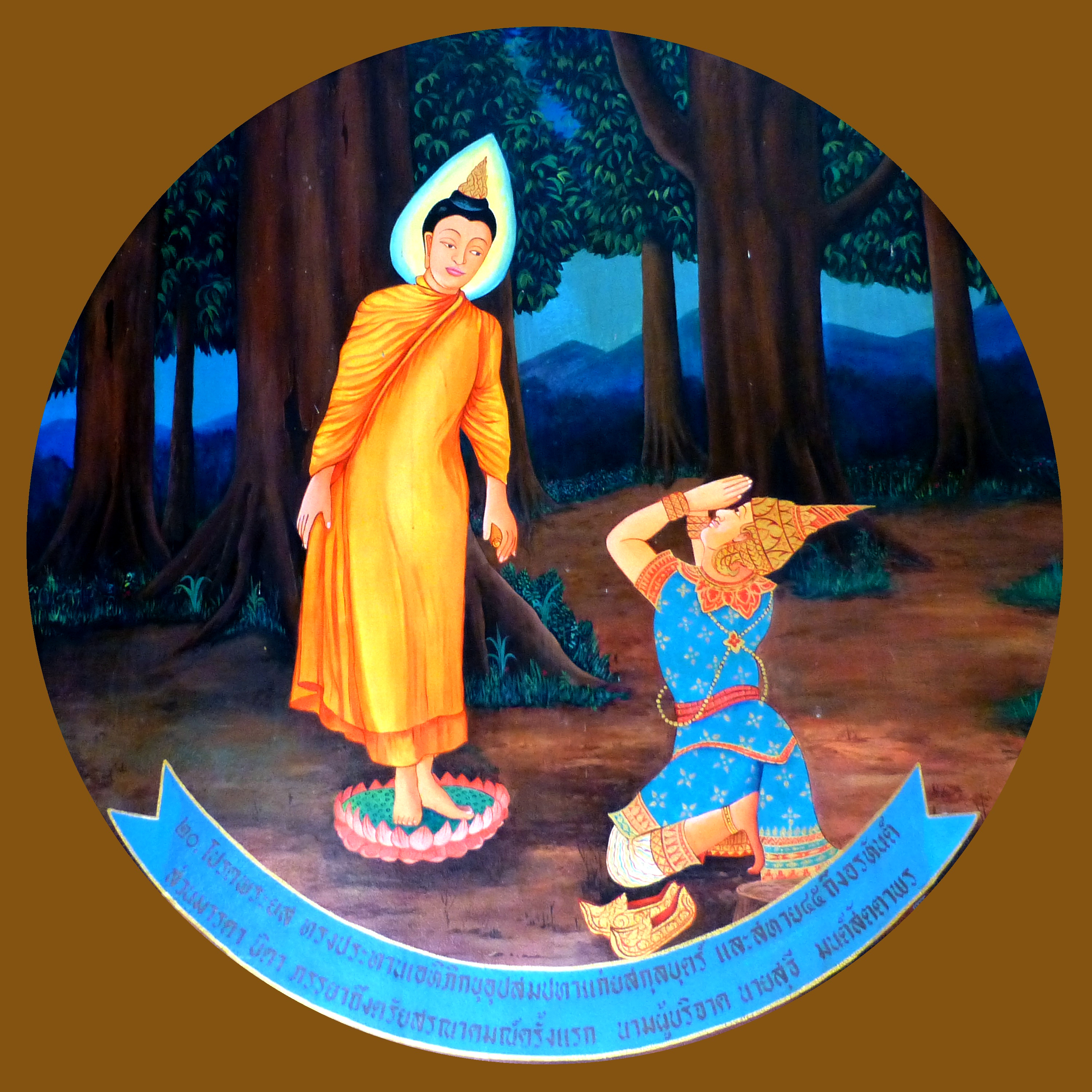
Conversion of Yasa; a modern depiction in a Thai temple

Yasa was the sixth bhikkhu in the Buddha's sangha and was the sixth to achieve arahanthood. The account of his going forth is found in the Vinaya of the Pali canon, in the Khandhaka's seventh chapter (Kd 1.7).

Yasa lived in the 6th century BCE in what is now Uttar Pradesh and Bihar in northern India. Yasa was raised in Varanasi in a life of luxury. His father was a wealthy merchant. As a young man, Yasa would spend the rainy season in one of the family's mansions, attended to by a group of female musicians. One morning he awoke to find the women and their instruments strewn in disarray across the floor. It reminded Yasa of a charnel ground (Pali: susānaṁ). Here, he saw the inevitable danger (Pali: ādīnavo) of a life steeped in sensual pleasure, and became disillusioned (Pali: nibbidāya). Yasa exclaimed, "Oh the oppression! Oh the affliction!" (Pali: upaddutaṁ vata bho, upassaṭṭhaṁ vata bho.) He left the mansion and wandered towards the deer park at Isipatana.

At that time, the Buddha was residing in the deer park where, just five days earlier, his first five bhikkhus had all attained arahantship. The Buddha was pacing up and down in an open space near where Yasa was muttering "Distressed am I, oppressed am I", and called Yasa over to him, inviting him to sit down. Yasa took off his golden sandals, saluted and sat down. The Buddha gave a dharma discourse, and Yasa achieved the first stage of arahanthood, sotapanna.

At first, the Buddha spoke about generosity (Dana), morality (sila), celestial states (sagga), the evils of sensual pleasure (kamadinava), blessing of renunciation (nekkhammanisamsa), before teaching the Four Noble Truths. Yasa's mother had noticed her son's absence, and notified her husband, who sent horsemen in four directions to search for Yasa. Yasa's father headed in the direction of Isipatana, following the trail left by the golden slippers. When Yasa's father saw the Buddha and asked him if he had seen Yasa, the Buddha asked him to sit down, and then delivered a dharma talk. After this Yasa's father became the first to take refuge in the Triple Gems, the Buddha, Dharma and Sangha. Yasa, who was in the vicinity and had heard the talk given to his father, became an arahant. After father and son were reunited, the father invited the Buddha and the Sangha to his home for alms on the following day. The Buddha then ordained Yasa.

The Buddha and his six arahants visited the home of Yasa the following day. Yasa's mother and his former wife thus became the first two female lay disciples. Upon hearing of Yasa's ordination, four of his closest friends, Vimala, Subahu, Punnaji and Gavampati followed him into the sangha and they too became arahants. Within two months, a further fifty of Yasa's friends had joined the Sangha and attained arahantship, bringing the total number of arahants to sixty.

== Sources ==
- Bhikkhu Brahmali (trans., English & Pali) (2021). The account of the going forth / Pabbajjākathā (Kd 1.7). Retrieved November 16, 2025 from "Sutta Central" at https://suttacentral.net/pli-tv-kd1/en/brahmali#pli-tv-kd1:7.1.0.
- I.B. Horner (trans., English) (1951). On the going forth of Yasa (Kd 1.7). Retrieved November 16, 2025 from "Sutta Central" at https://suttacentral.net/pli-tv-kd1/en/horner.
- Narada (2010) [1988]. "Chapter VII. The Teaching of the Dhamma". The Buddha and his teachings (PDF) (3rd ed.). Buddhist Publication Society.
- Nhất Hạnh, Thich (1987). "Chapter 23. Dharma Nector". Old Path White Clouds: Walking in the Footsteps of the Buddha.
