= Ishak Guebli =

Algerian footballer (born 1987)

Personal information
- Date of birth: 25 April 1987 (age 39)
- Place of birth: Bordj El Kiffan, Algeria
- Position: Centre back

Team information
- Current team: NA Hussein Dey
- Number: 24

Senior career*
Years	Team	Apps	(Gls)
2010–2011	USM El Harrach	3	(0)
2011–2012	CR Belouizdad	5	(0)
2014–2016	NA Hussein Dey	39	(1)
2016–2018	RC Relizane	25	(4)
2018–2019	USM Bel Abbès	13	(1)
2019–2020	US Biskra	9	(1)
2020–	NA Hussein Dey	0	(0)
- * Club domestic league appearances and goals as of 20:06, 7 December 2019 (UTC)

Ishak Guebli (born 25 April 1987) is an Algerian footballer who plays for NA Hussein Dey in the Algerian Ligue Professionnelle 1 as a centre back.
