= Djaïd Kasri =

French-Algerian footballer (born 1987)

Personal information
- Date of birth: 27 February 1987 (age 39)
- Place of birth: Villeneuve-Saint-Georges, France
- Height: 1.80 m (5 ft 11 in)
- Position: Midfielder

Team information
- Current team: Tournai
- Number: 30

Youth career
- 1999–2006: Nantes

Senior career*
Years	Team	Apps	(Gls)
2006–2007	Nantes	1	(0)
2007–2009	Zaragoza	0	(0)
2010	JS Kabylie	0	(0)
2010–2011	UJA Alfortville	6	(0)
2011–2014	Eupen	16	(0)
2014–2015	Virton	32	(2)
2015–2017	Antwerp	3	(0)
2017–2018	Lierse		
2018–2019	La Louvière	5	(1)
2019	UR Namur	8	(0)
2021–2025	La Louvière Centre	39	(0)
2025–	Tournai	0	(0)
- * Club domestic league appearances and goals as of 12:05, 21 January 2026 (UTC)

Djaïd Kasri (born 27 February 1987) is a French-Algerian professional footballer who plays as a midfielder for Tournai.

== Personal ==
Kasri was born in Villeneuve-Saint-Georges, France, to Algerian parents originally from the village of Tansaout in the Béjaïa Province. He grew up in Valenton, a southeastern suburb of Paris.

== Club career ==
At age 12, Kasri joined the FC Nantes Academy. On 26 May 2007 he made his debut for the first team as a 78th-minute substitute in a Ligue 1 game against Lyon, the final game of the 2006–07 season. However, he left the club shortly after, signing a contract with Spanish club Real Zaragoza. After spending two seasons and half, he ended his contract with the club.

In July 2009, Kasri was linked with a move to English Premier League club Tottenham FC, with German club TSV 1860 München also interested in his services. In January 2010, Kasri went on trial with Belgian club Standard Liège. In May 2010, he went on trial with French Ligue 2 side Tours FC.

=== JS Kabylie ===
On 16 June 2010 Kasri signed a one-year contract with Algerian club JS Kabylie. However, on 11 July 2010, less than one month after signing, he was released from the club after failing to impress manager Alain Geiger during a pre-season camp in Morocco.

=== Later career ===
After having played for Lierse S.K. and later La Louvière Centre, he joined Union Namur Fosses-La-Ville in September 2019.
