= Ramzi Bourakba =

Algerian footballer (born 1984)

Personal information
- Full name: Ramzi Bourakba
- Date of birth: 20 December 1984 (age 41)
- Place of birth: Bordj Bou Arréridj, Algeria
- Height: 1.88 m (6 ft 2 in)

Senior career*
Years	Team	Apps	(Gls)
2005–2006	NR Zéralda	-	(-)
2006–2008	JS Kabylie	1	(2)
2008–2010	USM El Harrach	42	(16)
2010–2012	CR Belouizdad	30	(14)
2012	Najran	11	(2)
2012–2013	JSM Béjaïa	0	(0)
2013	MC El Eulma	-	(-)
2013-2014	CR Belouizdad	9	(1)
2014-2015	RC Arbaâ	-	(-)
2015-2017	JSM Béjaïa	-	(1)
Total		93	(36)

International career
2010	Algeria A'	1	(0)
- * Club domestic league appearances and goals

Ramzi Bourakba (born 20 December 1984) previously played for several clubs in the Algerian Ligue Professionnelle 1 including JS Kabylie, CR Belouizdad and JSM Béjaïa, as well as a brief stint with Saudi Arabian club Najran S.FC

== Club career ==
On 3 January 2012 Bourakba joined Saudi Arabian club Najran SC until the end of the season.
