= Belkacem Remache =

Algerian footballer (born 1985)

Personal information
- Full name: Belkacem Remache
- Date of birth: October 12, 1985 (age 41)
- Place of birth: Constantine, Algeria
- Height: 1.77 m (5 ft 9 1/2 in)
- Position: Defender

Team information
- Current team: AS Khroub
- Number: 15

Senior career*
Years	Team	Apps	(Gls)
2006–2008	AS Khroub	-	(-)
2008–2010	USM Annaba	-	(-)
2010–2014	JS Kabylie	60	(1)
2014–2016	CS Constantine	0	(0)
2016–2019	RC Relizane	0	(0)
2019–	AS Khroub	0	(0)

International career^{‡}
2005–2007	Algeria U23	4	(0)
- * Club domestic league appearances and goals as of 21 July 2019 (UTC) ‡ National team caps and goals as of 00:00, May 26, 2012 (UTC)

Belkacem Remache (born October 12, 1985) is an Algerian football player who is currently playing as a defender for AS Khroub in the Algerian Ligue Professionnelle 2.

== Club career ==
On July 12, 2010, Remache signed a one-year contract with JS Kabylie.

== International career ==
On April 5, 2008, Remache was called up by the Algerian A' National Team for a game against USM Blida on April 11. He has also been capped at the Under-23 level.

On May 25, 2012, Remache was called up by Vahid Halilhodžić to the Algeria National Team for the first time, after a number of injuries to the players in camp.

== Honours ==
- Won the Algerian Cup once with JS Kabylie in 2010–11 Algerian Cup
