= Billel Naïli =

Algerian footballer (born 1986)

Personal information
- Full name: Billel Naïli
- Date of birth: June 15, 1986 (age 40)
- Place of birth: El Harrach, Algiers, Algeria
- Position: Midfielder

Team information
- Current team: USM El Harrach

Senior career*
Years	Team	Apps	(Gls)
2006–2010	USM El Harrach	28	(0)
2010–2011	JS Kabylie	22	(0)
2011–2014	CR Belouizdad	30	(0)
2014–2015	CRB Aïn Fakroun	?	(?)
2015–2017	JSM Skikda	?	(?)
2017–2018	GC Mascara	?	(?)
2018–	USM El Harrach	?	(?)
- * Club domestic league appearances and goals as of 2018

Billel Naïli (born June 15, 1986) is an Algerian footballer who is currently playing for USM El Harrach in the Algerian Ligue Professionnelle 2.

== Club career ==
=== JS Kabylie ===
On July 10, 2010, Naïli signed a one-year contract with JS Kabylie, joining them on a free transfer from USM El Harrach. On July 16, 2010, he made his official debut for the club, in a 2010 CAF Champions League group stage game against Egyptian club Ismaily SC. Naïli came on as a substitute in the 65th minute as JSK went on to win the game 1–0.

=== CR Belouizdad ===
On July 21, 2011, Naïli joined CR Belouizdad.

=== Suspension ===
In February 2019, Billal Naïli was suspended on a provisional basis after a doping charge, while playing for USM El Harrach. Naïli dropped a bombshell in his first reaction and claimed to have never been the subject of doping control. The test was positive for cocaine.

== Honours ==
- Won the Algerian Cup once with JS Kabylie in 2011
