= 2014–15 ES Sétif season =

ES Sétif
2014–15 season
- Chairman: Hassan Hammar
- Head coach: Kheïreddine Madoui
- Stadium: Stade 8 Mai 1945, Sétif
- Ligue 1: Champions
- Algerian Cup: Semi-finals
- CAF Champions League: Winners
- CAF Super Cup: Winners
- FIFA Club World Cup: fifth place
- CAF Champions League: Group stage
- Top goalscorer: League: Abdelmalek Ziaya (7); All: Abdelmalek Ziaya (12)
Home colours	Away colours	Third colours

In the 2014–15 season, ES Sétif competed in the Ligue 1 for the 45th season, as well as the Algerian Cup. It was their 17th consecutive season in the top flight of Algerian football. They also competed in the CAF Champions League, the Algerian Cup the CAF Super Cup and the FIFA Club World Cup.

== Squad list ==
Players and squad numbers last updated on 16 August 2014.
Note: Flags indicate national team as has been defined under FIFA eligibility rules. Players may hold more than one non-FIFA nationality.

No.	Nat.	Position	Name	Date of birth (age)	Moving from
Goalkeepers
1	(Algeria)	GK	Sofiane Khedairia	1 April 1989 (aged 25)	(France) Le Mans FC
22	(Algeria)	GK	Abderaouf Belhani	26 November 1986 (aged 27)	(Algeria) NA Hussein Dey
24	(Algeria)	GK	Amar Saadoune	12 December 1992 (aged 21)	Youth system
Defenders
2	(Algeria)	RB	Hichem Aoulmi	10 March 1993 (aged 21)	Youth system
5	(Algeria)	CB	Kheireddine Arroussi	23 July 1991 (aged 23)	Youth system
33	(Algeria)	CB	Sofiane Bouchar	21 May 1994 (aged 20)	Youth system
18	(Algeria)	LB	Lyes Boukria	9 September 1981 (aged 32)	(Algeria) CR Belouizdad
15	(Algeria)	CB	Abdelghani Demmou	29 January 1989 (aged 25)	(Algeria) USM El Harrach
6	(Algeria)	RB	Amine Megateli	4 May 1987 (aged 27)	(Algeria) JSM Béjaïa
12	(Algeria)	CB	Farid Mellouli	7 July 1984 (aged 30)	(Algeria) ASO Chlef
17	(Gabon)	LB	Benjamin Zé Ondo	18 June 1987 (aged 27)	(Gabon) US Bitam
Midfielders
	(France) (Algeria)	DM	Issam Baouz	30 November 1990 (aged 23)	(France) Villemomble Sports
26	(Algeria)	DM	Mohamed Lagraâ	7 November 1986 (aged 27)	(Algeria) USM El Harrach
25	(Algeria)	AM	El Hedi Belameiri	24 April 1991 (aged 23)	(France) CSO Amnéville
	(Central African Republic)	AM	Eudes Dagoulou	9 February 1990 (aged 24)	(Algeria) MC Oran
	(Algeria)	AM	Lazhar Hadj Aïssa	23 March 1984 (aged 30)	(Algeria) MC Alger
13	(Algeria)	CM	Sid Ali Lamri	3 February 1991 (aged 23)	(Algeria) MSP Batna
	(Algeria)	DM	Mohamed Billel Raït	16 May 1986 (aged 28)	(Algeria) RC Arbaâ
27	(Algeria)	DM	Toufik Zerara	3 February 1986 (aged 28)	(Algeria) JSM Béjaïa
	(Algeria)	DM	Mourad Delhoum	2 October 1985 (aged 28)	(Algeria) JS Kabylie
30	(Algeria)	AM	Akram Djahnit	3 April 1991 (aged 23)	Youth system
Forwards
8	(Algeria)	ST	Ahmed Gasmi	22 November 1984 (aged 29)	(Algeria) USM Alger
19	(Algeria)	ST	Abdelmalek Ziaya	23 January 1984 (aged 30)	(Algeria) USM Alger
	(Algeria)	ST	Mohamed Benyettou	1 November 1989 (aged 24)	(Algeria) MC Oran
	(Algeria)	ST	Abdelhakim Amokrane	10 May 1994 (aged 20)	Youth system
7	(Algeria)	LW	Sofiane Younès	25 November 1982 (aged 31)	(Algeria) USM El Harrach
	(Algeria)	LW	Ilyes Korbiaa	9 November 1991 (aged 22)	(Algeria) MC Oran
	(Algeria)	RW	Zahir Nemdil	3 March 1987 (aged 27)	(Algeria) MO Béjaïa

== Competitions ==
=== Overview ===
Competition	Record								Started round	Final position / round	First match	Last match
Competition	G	W	D	L	GF	GA	GD	Win %	Started round	Final position / round	First match	Last match
Ligue 1	30	13	9	8	37	28	+9	43.33	—N/a	Champions	16 August 2014	29 May 2015
Algerian Cup	5	4	1	0	10	5	+5	80.00	Round of 64	Semi-finals	23 December 2014	10 April 2015
2014 Champions League	10	3	6	1	16	13	+3	30.00	Preliminary round	Winners	2 March 2014	21 February 2015
2015 Champions League	4	1	3	0	7	5	+2	25.00	First round	Group stage	14 March 2015	1 May 2015
CAF Super Cup	1	0	1	0	1	1	+0	0.00	Final	Winners	14 February 2015	
FIFA Club World Cup	2	0	1	1	2	3	−1	0.00	Quarter-finals	fifth place	13 December 2014	17 December 2014
Total	52	21	21	10	73	55	+18	40.38				

=== Ligue 1 ===
==== League table ====
Pos	Team	Pld	W	D	L	GF	GA	GD	Pts	Qualification or relegation
1	ES Sétif (C)	30	13	9	8	37	28	+9	48	2016 CAF Champions League
2	MO Béjaïa	30	12	11	7	36	23	+13	47	2016 CAF Champions League
3	MC Oran	30	11	11	8	19	19	0	44	2016 CAF Confederation Cup
4	USM El Harrach	30	13	4	13	30	32	−2	43	
5	CS Constantine	30	11	9	10	32	31	+1	42 (Note: CSC 3-1 CRB; CRB 1-1 CSC)	2016 CAF Confederation Cup

Updated to match(es) played on 29 May 2015. Source: DZFoot
Rules for classification: 1) points; 2) head-to-head points; 3) head-to-head goal difference; 4) goal difference; 5) total goals; 6) fairplay ranking; 7) playoff
(C) Champions

==== Results summary ====
Overall								Home						Away					
Pld	W	D	L	GF	GA	GD	Pts	W	D	L	GF	GA	GD	W	D	L	GF	GA	GD
14	5	6	3	16	11	+5	21	3	3	0	7	3	+4	2	3	3	9	8	+1

Last updated: 21 December 2014.
Source: Competitive matches

==== Results by round ====
Round	1	2	3	4	5	6	7	8	9	10	11	12	13	14	15	16	17	18	19	20	21	22	23	24	25	26	27	28	29	30
Ground	A	H	A	H	A	H	A	H	A	A	H	A	H	A	H	H	A	H	A	H	A	H	A	H	H	A	H	A	H	A
Result	D	D	W	D	W	D	L	W	L	D	W	D	W	W	L	W	W	D	D	W	L	W	L	L	W	L	W	D	W	L
Position	8	12	6	6	3	4	7	4	6	8	5	5	5	4	4	2	2	2	2	2	2	2	2	2	1	1	1	1	1	1

Updated to match(es) played on 12 December 2014. Source: Competitive matches
A = Away; H = Home; W = Win; D = Draw; L = Loss

==== Matches ====
16 August 2014 1	USM Alger	1–1	ES Sétif	Algiers
19:00	Meftah 47' (pen.)	Report	15' (pen.) Djahnit	Stadium: Stade Omar Hammadi; Attendance: 7.000; Referee: Saïdi, Bechirene, Rezgane

6 September 2014 2	ES Sétif	0–0	USM Bel-Abbès	Sétif
20:00		Report		Stadium: Stade 8 Mai 1945; Referee: Amalou, Azrine, Haci

13 September 2014 3	MC El Eulma	0–1	ES Sétif	El Eulma
20:00		Report	64' Ziaya	Stadium: Stade Messaoud Zougar; Referee: Bichari, Salouadji, Rachdi

16 September 2014 4	ES Sétif	1–1	NA Hussein Dey	Sétif
20:00	Benyettou 55'	Report	63' (pen.) Ouznadji	Stadium: Stade 8 Mai 1945; Referee: Ghorbal, Serradj, Cherchar

2 October 2014 6	ES Sétif	1–1	MO Béjaïa	Sétif
20:00	Younès 88'	Report	37' Rahal	Stadium: Stade 8 Mai 1945; Referee: Bouslimani, Rimouche, Belbachir

17 October 2014 7	ASM Oran	1–0	ES Sétif	Oran
19:00	Benkablia 29'	Report		Stadium: Stade Habib Bouakeul; Referee: Helalchi, Brahim, Doulache

7 November 2014 10	JS Kabylie	1–1	ES Sétif	Algiers
17:00	Youcef Khodja 25'	Report	85' Dagoulou	Stadium: Stade 20 Août 1955; Attendance: 0 (close doors); Referee: Bassiri, Hellam, Zerhouni

14 November 2014 5	JS Saoura	1–2	ES Sétif	Béchar
15:00	Djousse 48'	Report	33' Gasmi; 71' Younès	Stadium: Stade 20 Août 1955; Referee: Mial, Idir, Semsoum

22 November 2014 11	ES Sétif	2–0	USM El Harrach	Sétif
17:45	Djahnit 7'; Megateli 30'	Report		Stadium: Stade 8 Mai 1945; Attendance: 20.000; Referee: Boukhalfa, Benali, Zerhouni

25 November 2014 8	ES Sétif	2–1	MC Alger	Sétif
18:00	Benyettou 14'; Megateli 67'	Report	68' Zeghdane	Stadium: Stade 8 Mai 1945; Attendance: 22.000; Referee: Ghorbal, Serradj, Hadj Saïd

29 November 2014 12	RC Arbaâ	1–1	ES Sétif	Larbaâ
15:00	Bouaïcha 75'	Report	82' Zerara	Stadium: Stade Ismaïl Makhlouf; Referee: Bassiri, Hallem, Berrachou

2 December 2014 9	ASO Chlef	2–1	ES Sétif	Chlef
16:00	Nait Yahia 28'; Zazou 45'	Report	52' Zerara	Stadium: Stade Mohamed Boumezrag; Referee: Boukouassa, Bounoua, Rachedi

6 December 2014 13	ES Sétif	1–0	CR Belouizdad	Sétif
17:45	Benyettou 86' (pen.)	Report		Stadium: Stade 8 Mai 1945; Attendance: 15.000; Referee: Ben Brahem, Allaoua, Cheballah

21 December 2014 14	CS Constantine	1–2	ES Sétif	Constantine
17:00	Boulemdaïs 39'	Report	19' Djahnit; 79' (pen.) Gasmi	Stadium: Stade Mohamed Hamlaoui; Attendance: 20.000; Referee: Benouza, Ghomari, Hallam

16 January 2014 15	ES Sétif	1–2	MC Oran	Sétif
16:00	Ziaya 90'	Report	56' Chérif; 74' Larbi	Stadium: Stade 8 Mai 1945

20 January 2015 16	ES Sétif	3–2	USM Alger	Sétif
18:00	Dagoulou 26', 52'; Ziaya 64'	Report	43' Boudebouda; 81' Nadji	Stadium: Stade 8 Mai 1945; Attendance: 12.000; Referee: Gherbal, Serradj, Cherchar

24 January 2015 17	USM Bel-Abbès	1–2	ES Sétif	Sidi Bel Abbès
16:00	Ogbi Benhadouche 69'	Report	51', 55' Delhoum	Stadium: Stade 24 Fevrier 1956; Referee: Bekouassa, Bounoua, Rachedi

31 January 2015 18	ES Sétif	1–1	MC El Eulma	Sétif
15:00	Belameiri 13'	Report	43' Derrardja	Stadium: Stade 8 Mai 1945; Referee: Halalchi, Brahim, Doulache

6 February 2015 19	NA Hussein Dey	0–0	ES Setif	Algiers
16:00		Report		Stadium: Stade 20 Août 1955; Referee: Bessiri, Rezgane, Hellam

14 February 2015 20	ES Setif	3–0	JS Saoura	Sétif
15:00	Ziaya 25' (pen.), 61', 86'	Report		Stadium: Stade 8 Mai 1945; Referee: Aouina, Benaïssa, Chenaoua

28 February 2015 21	MO Béjaïa	3–0	ES Sétif	Béjaïa
16:00	Hamzaoui 8'; Zerdab 31', 65'	Report		Stadium: Stade de l'Unité Maghrébine; Attendance: 25.000; Referee: Benouza, Brahim, Bechirene

6 March 2015 22	ES Setif	5–2	ASM Oran	Sétif
18:00	Younès 27', 60', 68'; Dahar 87'; Korbiaa 90'	Report	24' Aouad; 82' Benkabila	Stadium: Stade 8 Mai 1945; Referee: Arab, Bazzine, Bioud

21 March 2015 23	MC Alger	1–0	ES Sétif	Algiers
16:00	Aouadj 48'	Report		Stadium: Stade Omar Hammadi; Attendance: 18.000; Referee: Mial, Semsoum, Idir

28 March 2015 24	ES Sétif	0–1	ASO Chlef	Sétif
18:00		Report	76' Namani	Stadium: Stade 8 Mai 1945; Attendance: 0 (close doors); Referee: Houasnia, Badache, Boulekrinet

14 April 2015 25	ES Sétif	1–0	JS Kabylie	Sétif
17:00	Benyettou 66'	Report		Stadium: Stade 8 Mai 1945; Referee: Ghorbal, Seradj, Cherchar

25 April 2015 26	USM El Harrach	1–0	ES Sétif	Algiers
17:00	Bouguèche 55'	Report		Stadium: Stade 1er Novembre 1954; Referee: Boukhalfa, Etchiali, Zerhouni

9 May 2015 27	ES Sétif	2–1	RC Arbaâ	Sétif
17:00	Benyettou 51'; Belameiri 80'	Report	69' Darfalou	Stadium: Stade 8 Mai 1945; Referee: Hlalchi, Brahim, Doulache

16 May 2015 28	CR Belouizdad	0–0	ES Sétif	Algiers
17:00		Report		Stadium: Stade 20 Août 1955; Attendance: 0 (close doors); Referee: Benbraham, Allouache, Yahi

23 May 2015 29	ES Sétif	2–0	CS Constantine	Sétif
17:00	Benyettou 32'; Dagoulou 44'	Report		Stadium: Stade 8 Mai 1945; Referee: Bekouassa, Hamlaoui, Bounoua

29 May 2015 30	MC Oran	2–1	ES Sétif	Oran
17:00	Bezzaz 10' (pen.); Benchaâ 29'	Report	32' (pen.) Nemdil	Stadium: Stade Ahmed Zabana; Referee: Brahimi, Semsoum, Chaballah

== Algerian Cup ==
23 December 2014 Round of 64	MO Constantine	1–3	ES Sétif	Constantine
16:00	Korichi 82'		20' (pen.) Benyettou; 28', 34' Younès	Stadium: Stade Mohamed Hamlaoui; Referee: Gherbal, Cherchar, Siradj

27 December 2014 Round of 32	ES Sétif	3–2	Olympique de Médéa	Sétif
16:00	Benhamla 22' (o.g.); Gasmi 51'; Lamri 78'		50', 69' Boulaouidet	Stadium: Stade 8 Mai 1945; Referee: Bouslimani, Rimouche, Belbachir

10 February 2015 Round of 16	ES Sétif	1–0	ESM Koléa	Sétif
17:00	Ziaya 82'			Stadium: Stade 8 Mai 1945; Referee: Oukil, Serradj, Cherchar

10 March 2015 Quarter-finals	ES Sétif	2–1	JS Kabylie	Sétif
17:00	Gasmi 41'; Dahar 46'		Ziti 8'	Stadium: Stade 8 Mai 1945; Referee: Bichari, Brahim, Salaouadji

10 April 2015 Semi-finals	ES Sétif	1–1 (a.e.t.) (5–6 p)	MO Béjaïa	Sétif
17:00	Mellouli 1'		9' Mebarakou	Stadium: Stade 8 Mai 1945; Referee: Benouza, Etchiali, Omari
	Penalties
	Younès (penalty scored); Delhoum (penalty scored); Zerara (penalty scored); Lagraâ (penalty scored); Belameiri (penalty missed); Ziaya (penalty scored); Raït (penalty missed)		(penalty missed) Rahal; (penalty scored) Chatal; (penalty scored) N'Diaye; (penalty scored) ? (penalty scored) Mebarakou; (penalty scored) Benali; (penalty scored) Sidibe

== 2014 Champions League ==
=== Group stage ===
Pos	Team	Pld	W	D	L	GF	GA	GD	Pts	
1	(Tunisia) CS Sfaxien	6	3	2	1	8	5	+3	11	Advance to knockout stage
2	(Algeria) ES Sétif	6	2	4	0	9	6	+3	10	Advance to knockout stage
3	(Tunisia) Espérance de Tunis	6	2	1	3	8	9	−1	7	
4	(Libya) Al-Ahly Benghazi	6	1	1	4	5	10	−5	4	

Source: CAF

25 July 2014	Al-Ahly Benghazi (Libya)	0–2	(Algeria) ES Sétif	Tunis (Tunisia)
22:00 UTC+1		Report	Belameiri 18'; Younès 90+3'	Stadium: Stade Chedli Zouiten; Referee: Bakary Gassama (Gambia)

9 August 2014	ES Sétif (Algeria)	2–2	(Tunisia) Espérance de Tunis	Sétif
20:30 UTC+1	Djahnit 29' (pen.), 50'	Report	Akaïchi 7', 72'	Stadium: Stade 8 Mai 1945; Referee: Noumandiez Doué (Ivory Coast)

23 August 2014	CS Sfaxien (Tunisia)	1–1	(Algeria) ES Sétif	Sfax
18:00 UTC+1	Maâloul 87'	Report	Zé Ondo 64'	Stadium: Stade Taïeb Mhiri; Referee: Eric Otogo-Castane (Gabon)

=== Semi-finals ===
20 September 2014	ES Sétif (Algeria)	2–1	(Democratic Republic of the Congo) TP Mazembe	Sétif
20:00 UTC+1	Younès 55'; Ziaya 89'	Report	Arroussi 52' (o.g.)	Stadium: Stade 8 Mai 1945; Referee: Néant Alioum (Cameroon)

28 September 2014	TP Mazembe (Democratic Republic of the Congo)	3–2	(Algeria) ES Sétif	Lubumbashi
15:00 UTC+2	Adjei 21'; Coulibaly 38'; Bolingi 53'	Report	Ziaya 9'; Younès 75'	Stadium: Stade TP Mazembe; Referee: Gehad Grisha (Egypt)

=== Final ===
26 October 2014	AS Vita Club (Democratic Republic of the Congo)	2–2	(Algeria) ES Sétif	Kinshasa
15:30 UTC+1	Mabidi 45+3' (pen.), 77'	Report	Mubele 17' (o.g.); Djahnit 57'	Stadium: Stade Tata Raphaël; Referee: Janny Sikazwe (Zambia)

1 November 2014	ES Sétif (Algeria)	1–1	(Democratic Republic of the Congo) AS Vita Club	Blida
19:15 UTC+1	Younès 50'	Report	Mabidi 54'	Stadium: Stade Mustapha Tchaker; Referee: Bakary Gassama (Gambia)

== 2015 Champions League ==
=== First round ===
14 March 2015 First leg	Real Banjul (The Gambia)	1–1	(Algeria) ES Sétif	Brikama
16:30 UTC±0	Jallow 54'	Report	Bouchar 74'	Stadium: Box Bar Mini-Stadium; Referee: Ali Lemghaifry (Mauritania)

3 April 2015 Second leg	ES Sétif (Algeria)	2–0	(The Gambia) Real Banjul	Sétif
18:00 UTC+1	Zerara 20'; Mellouli 48'	Report		Stadium: Stade 8 Mai 1945; Referee: Denis Dembele (Ivory Coast)

=== Second round ===
19 April 2015 First leg	Raja Casablanca (Morocco)	2–2	(Algeria) ES Sétif	Casablanca
18:30 UTC+1	Salhi 50'; Karrouchi 74'	Report	Benyettou 45', 66'	Stadium: Stade Mohamed V Referee: Joseph Odartei Lamptey (Ghana)

1 May 2015 Second leg	ES Sétif (Algeria)	2–2 (4–1 p)	(Morocco) Raja Casablanca	Sétif
18:00 UTC+1	Belameiri 7'; Delhoum 49'	Report	Hafidi 58'; Karrouchi 90' (pen.)	Stadium: Stade 8 Mai 1945; Referee: Mohamed Said Kordi (Tunisia)
	Penalties
	Delhoum (penalty scored); Benyettou (penalty scored); Zerara (penalty scored); Lamri (penalty scored)		(penalty missed) Guehi; (penalty missed) Hafidi; (penalty scored) Salhi

== FIFA Club World Cup ==
13 December 2014 Quarter-finals	ES Sétif (Algeria)	0–1	(New Zealand) Auckland City	Rabat
16:00		Report	Irving 52'	Stadium: Prince Moulay Abdellah Stadium; Attendance: 22,153; Referee: Pedro Proença (Portugal)

17 December 2014 Match for fifth place	ES Sétif (Algeria)	2–2 (5–4 p)	(Australia) Western Sydney Wanderers	Marrakesh
16:30	Mullen 50' (o.g.); Ziaya 57'	Report	Castelen 5'; Saba 89'	Stadium: Stade de Marrakech; Attendance: 18.458; Referee: Norbert Hauata (Tahiti)
	Penalties
	Djahnit (penalty missed); Gasmi (penalty scored); Belameiri (penalty scored); Ziaya (penalty missed); Mellouli (penalty scored); Arroussi (penalty missed); Megateli (penalty scored); Zerara (penalty scored)		(penalty scored) Saba; (penalty missed) Haliti; (penalty scored) Trifiro; (penalty scored) Juric; (penalty missed) Bouzanis; (penalty missed) Mullen; (penalty scored) Fofanah; (penalty missed) Adeleke

== CAF Super Cup ==
21 February 2015	ES Sétif (Algeria)	1–1 (6–5 p)	(Egypt) Al-Ahly	Blida
16:00 UTC+1	Ziaya 68'	Report	Moteab 90+4'	Stadium: Stade Mustapha Tchaker; Attendance: 15.000; Referee: Noumandiez Doué (Ivory Coast)
	Penalties
	Delhoum (penalty scored); Mellouli (penalty scored); Benyettou (penalty scored); Dagoulou (penalty scored); Belameiri (penalty scored); Lamri (penalty scored)		(penalty scored) Zakaria; (penalty scored) Said; (penalty scored) Moteab; (penalty scored) Samir; (penalty scored) Trezeguet; (penalty missed) Ali

== Squad information ==
=== Playing statistics ===
No.	Pos	Nat	Player	Total		Ligue 1		Algerian Cup		Champions League		Other (Note: Includes the CAF Super Cup and FIFA Club World Cup)	
No.	Pos	Nat	Player	Apps	Goals	Apps	Goals	Apps	Goals	Apps	Goals	Apps	Goals
Goalkeepers
1	GK	(Algeria) ALG	Sofiane Khedairia	37	0	24	0	5	0	5	0	3	0
22	GK	(Algeria) ALG	Abderaouf Belhani	7	0	5	0	0	0	2	0	0	0
24	GK	(Algeria) ALG	Amar Saadoune	1	0	1	0	0	0	0	0	0	0
Defenders
2	DF	(Algeria) ALG	Hichem Aoulmi	0	0	0	0	0	0	0	0	0	0
5	DF	(Algeria) ALG	Said Arroussi	32	0	22	0	3	0	4	0	3	0
33	DF	(Algeria) ALG	Sofiane Bouchar	13	0	10	0	3	0	0	0	0	0
18	DF	(Algeria) ALG	Lyes Boukria	24	0	18	0	1	0	4	0	1	0
15	DF	(Algeria) ALG	Abdelghani Demmou	21	0	15	0	1	0	5	0	0	0
26	DF	(Algeria) ALG	Mohamed Lagraâ	27	0	16	0	3	0	6	0	2	0
6	DF	(Algeria) ALG	Amine Megateli	36	2	23	2	3	0	7	0	3	0
12	DF	(Algeria) ALG	Farid Mellouli	28	1	15	0	4	1	6	0	3	0
	DF	(Algeria) ALG	Ayache Ziouache	6	0	5	0	1	0	0	0	0	0
Midfielders
21	MF	(Algeria) ALG	Issam Baouz	4	0	3	0	1	0	0	0	0	0
25	MF	(Algeria) ALG	El Hedi Belameiri	33	3	21	2	2	0	7	1	3	0
30	MF	(Central African Republic) CAF	Eudes Dagoulou	27	4	22	4	3	0	0	0	2	0
	MF	(Algeria) ALG	Lazhar Hadj Aïssa	1	0	1	0	0	0	0	0	0	0
13	MF	(Algeria) ALG	Sid Ali Lamri	40	1	28	0	4	1	6	0	2	0
	MF	(Algeria) ALG	Mohamed Billel Raït	20	0	11	0	3	0	6	0	0	0
17	MF	(Gabon) GAB	Benjamin Zé Ondo	16	1	7	0	2	0	5	1	2	0
27	MF	(Algeria) ALG	Toufik Zerara	35	2	23	2	4	0	5	0	3	0
	MF	(Algeria) ALG	Mourad Delhoum	15	2	11	2	3	0	0	0	1	0
Forwards
30	FW	(Algeria) ALG	Akram Djahnit	37	6	23	3	4	0	7	3	3	0
8	FW	(Algeria) ALG	Ahmed Gasmi	22	4	16	2	3	2	0	0	3	0
19	FW	(Algeria) ALG	Abdelmalek Ziaya	30	11	17	6	3	1	7	2	3	2
9	FW	(Algeria) ALG	Mohamed Benyettou	38	7	27	6	2	1	7	0	2	0
	FW	(Algeria) ALG	Abdelhakim Amokrane	1	0	0	0	0	0	1	0	0	0
34	FW	(Algeria) ALG	Merouane Dahar	11	2	9	1	2	1	0	0	0	0
7	FW	(Algeria) ALG	Sofiane Younès	39	11	25	5	5	2	7	4	2	0
91	FW	(Algeria) ALG	Ilyes Korbiaa	12	1	11	1	1	0	0	0	0	0
23	FW	(Algeria) ALG	Zahir Nemdil	8	1	7	1	1	0	0	0	0	0
Players transferred out during the season

Last updated: 19 November 2017
Source: fr.soccerway.com

=== Goalscorers ===
Includes all competitive matches. The list is sorted alphabetically by surname when total goals are equal.

No.	Nat.	Player	Pos.	L 1	AC	CL 1	CWC	CSC	TOTAL
19	(Algeria)	Abdelmalek Ziaya	FW	7	1	2	1	1	12
5	(Algeria)	Sofiane Younès	FW	5	1	4	0	0	10
9	(Algeria)	Mohamed Benyettou	FW	6	2	2	0	0	10
30	(Algeria)	Akram Djahnit	FW	3	0	3	0	0	6
25	(Algeria)	El Hedi Belameiri	MF	2	0	4	0	0	6
8	(Algeria)	Ahmed Gasmi	FW	2	2	0	0	0	4
-	(Central African Republic)	Eudes Dagoulou	MF	4	0	0	0	0	4
27	(Algeria)	Toufik Zerara	MF	2	0	1	0	0	3
7	(Algeria)	Mourad Delhoum	MF	2	0	1	0	0	3
6	(Algeria)	Amine Megateli	DF	2	0	0	0	0	2
-	(Algeria)	Rachid Nadji	FW	0	0	2	0	0	2
34	(Algeria)	Merouane Dahar	FW	1	1	0	0	0	2
12	(Algeria)	Farid Mellouli	DF	0	1	1	0	0	2
13	(Algeria)	Sid Ali Lamri	MF	0	1	0	0	0	1
17	(Gabon)	Benjamin Zé Ondo	MF	0	0	1	0	0	1
-	(Algeria)	Ilyes Korbiaa	FW	1	0	0	0	0	1
-	(Algeria)	Zahir Nemdil	FW	1	0	0	0	0	1
33	(Algeria)	Mohamed Sofiane Bouchar	DF	0	0	1	0	0	1
Own Goals				0	1	0	1	0	1
Totals				37	10	22	2	1	62

== Transfers ==
=== In ===
Date	Pos	Player	From club	Transfer fee	Source
10 June 2014	FW	(Algeria) Sofiane Younès	USM El Harrach	Undisclosed	
1 July 2014	DF	(Algeria) Amine Megateli	JSM Béjaïa	Undisclosed	
1 July 2014	MF	(Algeria) Issam Baouz	(France) Villemomble Sports	Undisclosed	
1 July 2014	MF	(Central African Republic) Eudes Dagoulou	MC Oran	Undisclosed	
1 July 2014	FW	(Algeria) Mohamed Benyettou	MC Oran	Undisclosed	
13 July 2014	FW	(Algeria) Abdelmalek Ziaya	USM Alger	Undisclosed	
13 July 2014	FW	(Algeria) Ahmed Gasmi	USM Alger	Undisclosed	
8 January 2015	MF	(Algeria) Mourad Delhoum	JS Kabylie	Undisclosed	
