= 2014 FIFA Club World Cup squads =

Each team in the 2014 FIFA Club World Cup had to name a 23-man squad (three of whom must be goalkeepers) by the FIFA deadline of 28 November 2014. Injury replacements were allowed until 24 hours before the team's first match.

== Auckland City ==
Manager: (Spain) Ramon Tribulietx

Note: Flags indicate national team as defined under FIFA eligibility rules; some limited exceptions apply. Players may hold more than one non-FIFA nationality.

No.	Pos.	Nation	Player
1	GK	(New Zealand) NZL	Tamati Williams
2	DF	(New Zealand) NZL	Simon Arms
3	DF	(Japan) JPN	Takuya Iwata
4	MF	(Croatia) CRO	Mario Bilen
5	DF	(Spain) ESP	Ángel Berlanga
6	DF	(England) ENG	John Irving
7	DF	(New Zealand) NZL	James Pritchett
8	MF	(New Zealand) NZL	Tim Payne
9	FW	(England) ENG	Darren White
10	FW	(New Zealand) NZL	Ryan De Vries
11	MF	(New Zealand) NZL	Cameron Lindsay
13	FW	(Portugal) POR	João Moreira

No.	Pos.	Nation	Player
14	FW	(Nigeria) NGA	Sanni Issa
15	DF	(New Zealand) NZL	Ivan Vicelich (captain)
16	MF	(South Korea) KOR	Kim Dae-Wook
17	DF	(Serbia) SRB	Marko Đorđević
18	GK	(England) ENG	Louis Caunter
19	FW	(Papua New Guinea) PNG	David Browne
20	FW	(Argentina) ARG	Emiliano Tade
22	DF	(New Zealand) NZL	Andrew Milne
23	MF	(England) ENG	Sam Burfoot
24	GK	(New Zealand) NZL	Jacob Spoonley
25	FW	(Mexico) MEX	Fabrizio Tavano

== Cruz Azul ==
Manager: (Mexico) Luis Fernando Tena

Note: Flags indicate national team as defined under FIFA eligibility rules; some limited exceptions apply. Players may hold more than one non-FIFA nationality.

No.	Pos.	Nation	Player
1	GK	(Mexico) MEX	Jesús Corona
2	DF	(Mexico) MEX	Fausto Pinto
3	DF	(Mexico) MEX	Francisco Rodríguez
4	DF	(Mexico) MEX	Julio César Domínguez
5	MF	(Mexico) MEX	Alejandro Castro
6	MF	(Mexico) MEX	Gerardo Torrado (captain)
7	MF	(Mexico) MEX	Pablo Barrera
8	MF	(Mexico) MEX	Marco Fabián
9	FW	(Argentina) ARG	Mariano Pavone
10	MF	(Mexico) MEX	Christian Giménez
11	MF	(Ecuador) ECU	Joao Rojas
12	GK	(Mexico) MEX	Guillermo Allison

No.	Pos.	Nation	Player
15	DF	(Mexico) MEX	Gerardo Flores
16	DF	(Mexico) MEX	Rogelio Chávez
17	DF	(Argentina) ARG	Emanuel Loeschbor
18	FW	(Mexico) MEX	Ismael Valadéz
19	MF	(Mexico) MEX	Alejandro Vela
20	FW	(Argentina) ARG	Pablo Gabriel Torres
21	MF	(Mexico) MEX	Xavier Báez
23	FW	(Mexico) MEX	Aníbal Zurdo
25	GK	(Mexico) MEX	Yosgart Gutiérrez
27	MF	(Argentina) ARG	Hernán Bernardello
33	MF	(Argentina) ARG	Mauro Formica

== ES Sétif ==
Manager: (Algeria) Kheïreddine Madoui

Note: Flags indicate national team as defined under FIFA eligibility rules; some limited exceptions apply. Players may hold more than one non-FIFA nationality.

No.	Pos.	Nation	Player
1	GK	(Algeria) ALG	Sofiane Khedairia
3	FW	(Algeria) ALG	Sofiane Younès
4	DF	(Algeria) ALG	Said Arroussi
6	DF	(Algeria) ALG	Amine Megateli
8	FW	(Algeria) ALG	Ahmed Gasmi
9	FW	(Algeria) ALG	Mohamed Benyettou
10	FW	(Algeria) ALG	Akram Djahnit
13	FW	(Algeria) ALG	Sid Ali Lamri
16	MF	(Algeria) ALG	Mohamed Rait
17	MF	(Gabon) GAB	Benjamin Zé Ondo
18	DF	(Algeria) ALG	Lyes Boukria
19	MF	(Algeria) ALG	Abdelmalek Ziaya

No.	Pos.	Nation	Player
20	DF	(Algeria) ALG	Farid Mellouli
21	MF	(Algeria) ALG	Issam Baouz
22	GK	(Algeria) ALG	Omar Saadoune
23	FW	(Algeria) ALG	Zahir Nemdil
24	GK	(Algeria) ALG	Abderaouf Belhani
25	DF	(Algeria) ALG	El Hedi Belameiri
26	DF	(Algeria) ALG	Mohamed Lagraâ
29	MF	(Algeria) ALG	Toufik Zerara
30	MF	(Central African Republic) CTA	Eudes Dagoulou
35	DF	(Algeria) ALG	Sofiane Bouchar
91	FW	(Algeria) ALG	Ilyes Korbiaa

== Moghreb Tétouan ==
Manager: (Morocco) Aziz El Amri

Note: Flags indicate national team as defined under FIFA eligibility rules; some limited exceptions apply. Players may hold more than one non-FIFA nationality.

No.	Pos.	Nation	Player
3	DF	(Morocco) MAR	Mohamed Abarhoun (captain)
5	DF	(Senegal) SEN	Mourtada Fall
6	DF	(Morocco) MAR	Mehdi Khallati
7	DF	(Morocco) MAR	Youssef Bouchtah
8	MF	(Morocco) MAR	Noussair El Maimouni
9	FW	(Morocco) MAR	Mouhcine Iajour
10	MF	(Morocco) MAR	Zaid Krouch
11	MF	(Morocco) MAR	Mehdi Azim
12	GK	(Morocco) MAR	Mohamed El Youssfi
14	DF	(Morocco) MAR	Anas Lamrabat
16	DF	(Morocco) MAR	Bilal Zriouh
17	FW	(Morocco) MAR	Faouzi Abdelghani

No.	Pos.	Nation	Player
19	FW	(Morocco) MAR	Naim Zouhir
20	MF	(Morocco) MAR	Ahmed Jahouh
21	FW	(Morocco) MAR	Abdessamad Rafik
22	GK	(Morocco) MAR	Adnane El Assimi
23	MF	(Morocco) MAR	Said Grada
24	MF	(Morocco) MAR	Abdelmoula El Hardoumi
25	FW	(Netherlands) NED	Anouar Hadouir
26	MF	(Morocco) MAR	Abdeladim Khadrouf
30	DF	(Morocco) MAR	Hamza El Moussaoui
31	GK	(France) FRA	Foued Baba Alla
87	FW	(Morocco) MAR	Salman Ouald Elhaj

== Real Madrid ==
Manager: (Italy) Carlo Ancelotti

Note: Flags indicate national team as defined under FIFA eligibility rules; some limited exceptions apply. Players may hold more than one non-FIFA nationality.

No.	Pos.	Nation	Player
1	GK	(Spain) ESP	Iker Casillas (captain)
2	DF	(France) FRA	Raphaël Varane
3	DF	(Portugal) POR	Pepe
4	DF	(Spain) ESP	Sergio Ramos
5	DF	(Portugal) POR	Fábio Coentrão
6	MF	(Germany) GER	Sami Khedira
7	FW	(Portugal) POR	Cristiano Ronaldo
8	MF	(Germany) GER	Toni Kroos
9	FW	(France) FRA	Karim Benzema
10	MF	(Colombia) COL	James Rodríguez
11	MF	(Wales) WAL	Gareth Bale

No.	Pos.	Nation	Player
12	DF	(Brazil) BRA	Marcelo
13	GK	(Costa Rica) CRC	Keylor Navas
14	FW	(Mexico) MEX	Javier Hernández
15	DF	(Spain) ESP	Dani Carvajal
17	DF	(Spain) ESP	Álvaro Arbeloa
18	DF	(Spain) ESP	Nacho
20	FW	(Spain) ESP	Jesé
23	MF	(Spain) ESP	Isco
24	MF	(Spain) ESP	Asier Illarramendi
25	GK	(Spain) ESP	Fernando Pacheco
26	MF	(Spain) ESP	Álvaro Medrán

== San Lorenzo ==
Manager: (Argentina) Edgardo Bauza

Note: Flags indicate national team as defined under FIFA eligibility rules; some limited exceptions apply. Players may hold more than one non-FIFA nationality.

No.	Pos.	Nation	Player
1	GK	(Argentina) ARG	Leo Franco
2	DF	(Argentina) ARG	Mauro Cetto
3	DF	(Colombia) COL	Mario Yepes
5	MF	(Argentina) ARG	Juan Mercier
7	MF	(Argentina) ARG	Julio Buffarini
8	MF	(Argentina) ARG	Enzo Kalinski
9	FW	(Uruguay) URU	Martín Cauteruccio
10	MF	(Argentina) ARG	Leandro Romagnoli
11	MF	(Argentina) ARG	Pablo Barrientos
12	GK	(Argentina) ARG	Sebastián Torrico
13	DF	(Argentina) ARG	Ramiro Arias
14	DF	(Argentina) ARG	Walter Kannemann

No.	Pos.	Nation	Player
15	FW	(Argentina) ARG	Héctor Villalba
20	MF	(Paraguay) PAR	Néstor Ortigoza
21	DF	(Argentina) ARG	Emmanuel Más
22	FW	(Argentina) ARG	Nicolás Blandi
24	MF	(Argentina) ARG	Juan Cavallaro
26	FW	(Argentina) ARG	Mauro Matos
27	DF	(Argentina) ARG	Matías Catalán
29	DF	(Argentina) ARG	Fabricio Fontanini
30	FW	(Argentina) ARG	Gonzalo Verón
31	MF	(Argentina) ARG	Facundo Quignon
33	GK	(Argentina) ARG	José Devecchi

== Western Sydney Wanderers ==
Manager: (Australia) Tony Popovic

Note: Flags indicate national team as defined under FIFA eligibility rules; some limited exceptions apply. Players may hold more than one non-FIFA nationality.

No.	Pos.	Nation	Player
1	GK	(Australia) AUS	Ante Covic
2	DF	(Australia) AUS	Shannon Cole
3	DF	(Australia) AUS	Daniel Mullen
4	DF	(Australia) AUS	Nikolai Topor-Stanley (captain)
5	DF	(Australia) AUS	Brendan Hamill
6	DF	(Australia) AUS	Antony Golec
7	FW	(Australia) AUS	Labinot Haliti
8	MF	(Croatia) CRO	Mateo Poljak
9	FW	(Australia) AUS	Tomi Juric
10	MF	(Brazil) BRA	Vítor Saba
12	FW	(Australia) AUS	Nikita Rukavytsya
13	DF	(Australia) AUS	Matthew Spiranovic

No.	Pos.	Nation	Player
16	FW	(Australia) AUS	Jaushua Sotirio
17	FW	(Netherlands) NED	Romeo Castelen
18	MF	(Italy) ITA	Iacopo La Rocca
19	FW	(Australia) AUS	Mark Bridge
20	GK	(Australia) AUS	Dean Bouzanis
22	DF	(Nigeria) NGA	Seyi Adeleke
23	MF	(Australia) AUS	Jason Trifiro
31	MF	(Australia) AUS	Alusine Fofanah
32	DF	(Australia) AUS	Daniel Alessi
35	MF	(Australia) AUS	Kearyn Baccus
40	GK	(Australia) AUS	Tom Heward-Belle
