= 2013–14 ES Sétif season =

ES Sétif
2013–14 season
- Chairman: Hassan Hammar
- Head coach: Hubert Velud (until 7 September 2013); Kheirredine Madoui (interim) (from 8 September 2013) (until 26 September 2013); Jean-Christian Lang (from 27 September 2013) (until 7 December 2013); Rabah Saâdane (from 8 December 2013) (until 5 July 2014)
- Stadium: Stade 8 Mai 1945
- Ligue 1: 3rd
- Algerian Cup: Round of 16
- Algerian Super Cup: Runners-up
- CAF Confederation Cup: Group stage
- CAF Champions League: Group stage
- Top goalscorer: League: Khaled Gourmi; Rachid Nadji (7); All: Rachid Nadji (11)
Home colours	Away colours	Third colours

In the 2013–14 season, ES Sétif competed in the Ligue 1 for the 44th season, as well as the Algerian Cup. It was their 16th consecutive season in the top flight of Algerian football.

== Competitions ==
=== Overview ===
Competition	Record								Started round	Final position / round	First match	Last match
Competition	G	W	D	L	GF	GA	GD	Win %	Started round	Final position / round	First match	Last match
Ligue 1	30	15	8	7	40	27	+13	50.00	—N/a	3rd	24 August 2013	22 May 2014
Algerian Cup	3	2	1	0	6	1	+5	66.67	Round of 64	Round of 16	7 December 2013	24 January 2014
Super Cup	1	0	0	1	0	2	−2	0.00	Final	Winners	11 January 2014	
CAF Confederation Cup	6	1	3	2	5	7	−2	16.67	Group stage		19 July 2013	21 September 2013
Champions League	7	4	3	0	16	6	+10	57.14	First round	Group stage (Note: The competition will be completed in the new season 2014–15 starting from the fourth round.)	2 March 2014	7 June 2014
Total	47	22	15	10	67	43	+24	46.81				

Updated to match played 9 May 2017
Source: Competitions

=== Ligue 1 ===
==== League table ====
Pos	Team	Pld	W	D	L	GF	GA	GD	Pts	Qualification or relegation
1	USM Alger (C)	30	20	8	2	49	21	+28	68	Qualification for the Champions League preliminary round
2	JS Kabylie (Note: JS Kabylie, the 2013–14 Algerian Ligue Professionnelle 1 runner-up, was suspended by the CAF for two years due to the death of Albert Ebossé during their league home match against USM Alger. On 11 February 2015, the CAS overturned the suspension. However, their replacement MC El Eulma continued to represent Algeria in the 2015 CAF Champions League.)	30	15	9	6	39	21	+18	54	
3	ES Sétif	30	15	8	7	40	27	+13	53	Qualification for the Champions League first round
4	MC El Eulma	30	13	9	8	38	28	+10	48	Qualification for the Champions League preliminary round
5	USM El Harrach (Note: USM El Harrach would have qualified for the CAF Confederation Cup preliminary round by finishing fourth in the 2013–14 Algerian Ligue Professionnelle 1, but due to the penalty imposed on them by CAF after their withdrawal from the 2014 CAF Champions League, they could not participate.)	30	13	8	9	34	27	+7	47	

Updated to match(es) played on 22 May 2014. Source: DZFoot
Rules for classification: 1) points; 2) head-to-head points; 3) head-to-head goal difference; 4) goal difference; 5) total goals; 6) fairplay ranking; 7) playoff.
(C) Champions

==== Results summary ====
Overall								Home						Away					
Pld	W	D	L	GF	GA	GD	Pts	W	D	L	GF	GA	GD	W	D	L	GF	GA	GD
30	20	8	2	47	21	+26	68	12	2	1	30	14	+16	8	6	1	17	7	+10

Last updated: 21 December 2014.
Source: Competitive matches

==== Results by round ====
Round	1	2	3	4	5	6	7	8	9	10	11	12	13	14	15	16	17	18	19	20	21	22	23	24	25	26	27	28	29	30
Ground	A	H	A	H	A	H	H	A	H	A	H	A	H	A	H	H	A	H	A	H	A	A	H	A	H	A	H	A	H	A
Result	W	D	W	W	W	L	W	D	D	L	W	D	D	W	D	W	W	W	W	W	L	D	L	L	W	W	W	L	L	D
Position	7	7	5	1	1	1	1	1	1	2	1	1	3	2	2	2	2	1	1	1	2	2	2	2	2	2	2	2	3	3

Updated to match(es) played on 12 December 2014. Source: Competitive matches
A = Away; H = Home; W = Win; D = Draw; L = Loss

==== Matches ====
24 August 2013 Round 1	CRB Aïn Fakroun	0–1	ES Sétif	Aïn M'lila
17:00		Report	55' Gourmi	Stadium: Stade des Frères Demane Debbih; Referee: Farouk Houasnia

6 September 2013 Round 2	ES Sétif	1–1	MC Oran	Sétif
18:00	Gourmi 43'	Report	35' Benyettou	Stadium: Stade 8 Mai 1945; Referee: Mokhtar Amalou

3 September 2013 Round 3	CR Belouizdad	1–2	ES Sétif	Algiers
18:00	Dahar 61'	Report	51' Ziti; 79' Zerara	Stadium: Stade 20 Août 1955; Referee: Mustapha Ghorbal

24 September 2013 Round 4	ES Sétif	5–0	JSM Béjaïa	Sétif
18:00	El Okbi 18'; Karaoui 19', 90+3'; Gourmi 45+1', 61'	Report		Stadium: Stade 8 Mai 1945; Referee: Mohamed Chokri Bechirène

1 October 2013 Round 5	ASO Chlef	0–1	ES Sétif	Chlef
18:00		Report	77' Delhoum	Stadium: Stade Mohamed Boumezrag; Referee: Mohamed Bichari

28 September 2013 Round 6	ES Sétif	0–1	RC Arbaâ	Sétif
18:00		Report	50' Harrouche	Stadium: Stade 8 Mai 1945; Referee: Mohamed Sahraoui

5 October 2013 Round 7	ES Sétif	2–1	MC Alger	Sétif
17:45	Ziti 3'; Karaoui 20'	Report	34' Hachoud	Stadium: Stade 8 Mai 1945; Referee: Mustapha Ghorbal

19 October 2013 Round 8	JS Kabylie	1–1	ES Sétif	Tizi Ouzou
17:45	Ebossé Bodjongo 90'	Report	74' (o.g.) Remache	Stadium: Stade du 1er Novembre 1954; Referee: Farouk Houasnia

26 October 2013 Round 9	ES Sétif	1–1	CS Constantine	Sétif
17:45	Djahnit 25'	Report	39' Naït Yahia	Stadium: Stade 8 Mai 1945; Referee: Redouane Necib

2 November 2013 Round 10	MO Béjaïa	2–0	ES Sétif	Béjaïa
17:00	Yaya 32'; W. Semani 66'	Report		Stadium: Stade de l'Unité Maghrébine; Referee: Mohamed Bichari

9 November 2013 Round 11	ES Sétif	1–0	JS Saoura	Sétif
17:00	Lamri 87'	Report		Stadium: Stade 8 Mai 1945; Referee: Sofiane Bousseter

23 November 2013 Round 12	CA Bordj Bou Arréridj	1–1	ES Sétif	Bordj Bou Arréridj
16:45	H. Hamdadou 25'	Report	70' (pen.) Gourmi	Stadium: Stade 20 Août 1955; Referee: Djamel Haimoudi

29 November 2013 Round 13	ES Sétif	0–0	MC El Eulma	Sétif
16:45		Report		Stadium: Stade 8 Mai 1945; Referee: Mokhtar Amalou

14 December 2013 Round 14	USM El Harrach	0–2	ES Sétif	Algiers
15:00		Report	66' Touahri; 90+5' Djahnit	Stadium: Stade 1er Novembre 1954; Referee: Mustapha Ghorbal

28 December 2013 Round 15	ES Sétif	1–1	USM Alger	Sétif
17:45	Madouni 90+4'	Report	64' Feham	Stadium: Stade 8 Mai 1945; Referee: Mohamed Saïdi

18 January 2014 Round 16	ES Sétif	1–0	CRB Aïn Fakroun	Sétif
18:00	Tiaïba 80'	Report		Stadium: Stade 8 Mai 1945; Referee: Sofiane Bousseter

1 February 2014 Round 17	MC Oran	0–1	ES Sétif	Oran
15:00		Report	11' Nadji	Stadium: Ahmed Zabana Stadium; Referee: Amine Sekhraoui

7 February 2014 Round 18	ES Sétif	1–0	CR Belouizdad	Sétif
16:00	Boukria 25'	Report		Stadium: Stade 8 Mai 1945; Referee: Youssef Zerrouki

15 February 2014 Round 19	JSM Béjaïa	0–2	ES Sétif	Béjaïa
15:00		Report	77' Karaoui; 90+2' Nadji	Stadium: Stade de l'Unité Maghrébine; Referee: Sofiane Bousseter

22 February 2014 Round 20	ES Sétif	1–0	ASO Chlef	Sétif
17:45	K. Selama 14' (o.g.)	Report		Stadium: Stade 8 Mai 1945; Referee: Farouk Mial

27 February 2014 Round 21	RC Arbaâ	1–0	ES Sétif	Blida
15:00	Amiri 28' (pen.)	Report		Stadium: Stade Frères Brakni; Referee: Farouk Houasnia

5 March 2014 Round 22	MC Alger	1–1	ES Sétif	Algiers
14:30	Hachoud 90'	Report	27' Tiaïba	Stadium: Stade Omar Hamadi; Referee: Said Aouina

15 March 2014 Round 23	ES Sétif	0–2	JS Kabylie	Sétif
17:45		Report	10' Ebossé Bodjongo; 77' Raiah	Stadium: Stade 8 Mai 1945; Referee: Mohamed Bichari

18 March 2014 Round 24	CS Constantine	2–1	ES Sétif	Constantine
17:30	Zerdab 24'; E. Henaini 90'	Report	78' (pen.) Gourmi	Stadium: Stade Mohamed Hamlaoui; Referee: Mohamed Amine Bachir

26 April 2014 Round 25	ES Sétif	3–2	MO Béjaïa	Sétif
19:00	Belameiri 53'; Nadji 72', 84'	Report	43' Y. Nehari; 79' N. YattouYettou	Stadium: Stade 8 Mai 1945; Referee: Mehdi Abid Charef

3 May 2014 Round 26	JS Saoura	0–3	ES Sétif	Béchar
17:00		Report	47' Lagraâ; 67' Karaoui; 86' Nadji	Stadium: Stade 20 Août 1955; Referee: Ahmed Bouzrar

10 May 2014 Round 27	ES Sétif	4–3	CA Bordj Bou Arréridj	Sétif
18:00	Gourmi 55' (pen.); El Okbi 70'; Nadji 73'; Lamri 85'	Report	6' I. Bouflih; 21' A. Mansour; 52' A. Djarrar	Stadium: Stade 8 Mai 1945; Referee: Mohamed Benouza

13 May 2014 Round 28	MC El Eulma	2–1	ES Sétif	El Eulma
18:00	Hamiti 11'; Derrardja 85'	Report	66' Nadji	Stadium: Stade Messaoud Zougar; Referee: Abderrezzak Arab

20 May 2014 Round 29	ES Sétif	0–1	USM El Harrach	Sétif
18:00		Report	50' Mazari	Stadium: Stade 8 Mai 1945; Referee: Mohamed Sahraoui

22 May 2014 Round 30	USM Alger	2–2	ES Sétif	Algiers
19:15	Seguer 8'; Ferhat 76'	Report	20' Djahnit; 88' Nadji	Stadium: Stade Omar Hamadi; Referee: Redouane Necib

== Algerian Cup ==
7 December 2013 Round of 64	ES Sétif	2–0	NT Souf	Sétif
16:00	Djahnit 9'; Mellouli 40'	Repport		Stadium: Stade 8 Mai 1945

21 December 2013 Round of 32	ES Sétif	3–0	US Remchi	Sétif
16:00	Madouni 76'; Djahnit 79'; Gourmi 90'	Repport		Stadium: Stade 8 Mai 1945; Referee: Boukouassa, Salaouati, Saïdi

24 January 2014 Round of 16	ES Sétif	1–1 (0–3 p)	CS Constantine	Sétif
16:30	Demmou 76'	Repport	42' Boulemdaïs	Stadium: Stade 8 Mai 1945; Referee: Haïmoudi, Etchiali, Omari

== Algerian Super Cup ==
11 January 2014	USM Alger	2–0	ES Sétif	Blida
16:00	Ziaya 8'; Andria 40'	Report		Stadium: Stade Mustapha Tchaker; Attendance: 14.312; Referee: Mohamed Bichari

== CAF Confederation Cup ==
=== Group stage ===
Team	Pld	W	D	L	GF	GA	GD	Pts	TPM	CAB	FUS	ESS
(Democratic Republic of the Congo) TP Mazembe	6	3	1	2	9	6	+3	10		1–0	3–0	4–2
(Tunisia) CA Bizertin	6	2	2	2	3	3	0	8 (Note: Tiebreakers: CA Bizertin are ranked ahead of FUS Rabat on head-to-head record.)	1–0		1–0	0–0
(Morocco) FUS Rabat	6	2	2	2	5	6	−1	8	2–0	1–1		1–0
(Algeria) ES Sétif	6	1	3	2	5	7	−2	6	1–1	1–0	1–1	

Legend: Blue = home team win; Yellow = draw; Red = away team win.
Notes:

19 July 2013	ES Sétif (Algeria)	1–1	(Democratic Republic of the Congo) TP Mazembe	Sétif
22:00 UTC+1	Delhoum 82'	Report	Samatta 81'	Stadium: Stade 8 Mai 1945; Referee: Bakary Gassama (Gambia)

4 August 2013	CA Bizertin (Tunisia)	0–0	(Algeria) ES Sétif	Tunis
22:00 UTC+1		Report		Stadium: Stade Chedli Zouiten; Referee: Ali Lemghaifry (Mauritania)

18 August 2013	FUS Rabat (Morocco)	1–0	(Algeria) ES Sétif	Rabat
19:00 UTC+1	Batna 34'	Report		Stadium: Prince Moulay Abdellah Stadium; Referee: Hudu Munyemana (Rwanda)

30 August 2013	ES Sétif (Algeria)	1–1	(Morocco) FUS Rabat	Sétif
20:30 UTC+1	Gourmi 14' (pen.)	Report	El Bahri 77'	Stadium: Stade 8 Mai 1945; Referee: Néant Alioum (Cameroon)

14 September 2013	TP Mazembe (Democratic Republic of the Congo)	4–2	(Algeria) ES Sétif	Lubumbashi
15:30 UTC+2	Ulimwengu 4', 27'; Mputu 16'; Samatta 63'	Report	Ziti 5'; Gourmi 72'	Stadium: Stade TP Mazembe; Referee: Gehad Grisha (Egypt)

21 September 2013	ES Sétif (Algeria)	1–0	(Tunisia) CA Bizertin	Sétif
19:00 UTC+1	Boukria 85'	Report		Stadium: Stade 8 Mai 1945; Referee: Khalid Abdel Rahman (Sudan)

== Champions League ==
=== First round ===
2 March 2014 first leg	ES Sétif (Algeria)	5–0	(Burkina Faso) ASFA Yennenga	Sétif
17:45 UTC+1	Belameiri 18'; Benhadouche 37', 42'; Nadji 69'; Djahnit 90+4'	Report		Stadium: Stade 8 Mai 1945; Referee: Slim Jedidi (Tunisia)
Note: Lineup for ES Sétif - Khedaïria, Eulmi, Arroussi, Benabderrahamane, Boukria, Zerara, Ferrahi, Ogbi (Djahnit 46’) Belameiri, Nadji (Lamri 81’) Gourmi (Touahri 66’)

8 March 2014 Second leg	ASFA Yennenga (Burkina Faso)	0–0	(Algeria) ES Sétif	Ouagadougou
16:00 UTC±0		Report		Stadium: Stade du 4-Août; Referee: Sékou Ahmed Touré (Guinea)
Note: Lineup for ES Sétif - Khedaïria, Eulmi, Ziti, Aroussi, Boukria, Ferrahi, Legraa, Zerara, Belameiri (Ogbi 78’) Nadji (Amokrane 80’) Lamri (Touahri 69’)

=== Second round ===
23 March 2014 first leg	ES Sétif (Algeria)	1–0	(Cameroon) Coton Sport	Sétif
19:15 UTC+1	Belameiri 45+2'	Report		Stadium: Stade 8 Mai 1945; Referee: Hagi Wiish (Somalia)
Note: Lineup for ES Sétif - Khedaïria, Oulmi, Aroussi, Ziti, Boukria, Zerara (Djahnit 60’) Ferrahi, Karaoui, Belameiri, Nadji (Tiaiba 62’) Gourmi (Lamri 79’)

30 March 2014 Second leg	Coton Sport (Cameroon)	0–1	(Algeria) ES Sétif	Garoua
15:00 UTC+1		Report	11' Belameiri	Stadium: Roumdé Adjia Stadium; Referee: Rajindraparsad Seechurn (Mauritius)
Note: Lineup for ES Sétif - Khedaïria, Ziti, Mellouli, Aroussi, Legraa, Zerara, Ferahi, Karaoui, Belameiri (Touahri 75’) Nadji (Ogbi 90’) Lamri (Boukria 87’)

=== Group stage ===
Pos	Team	Pld	W	D	L	GF	GA	GD	Pts	
1	(Tunisia) CS Sfaxien	6	3	2	1	8	5	+3	11	Advance to knockout stage
2	(Algeria) ES Sétif	6	2	4	0	9	6	+3	10	Advance to knockout stage
3	(Tunisia) Espérance de Tunis	6	2	1	3	8	9	−1	7	
4	(Libya) Al-Ahly Benghazi	6	1	1	4	5	10	−5	4	

Source: CAF

17 May 2014	Espérance de Tunis (Tunisia)	1–2	(Algeria) ES Sétif	Radès
20:00 UTC+1	Mhirsi 54'	Report	Nadji 24'; Belameiri 48'	Stadium: Stade Olympique de Radès; Referee: Aboubacar Mario Bangoura (Guinea)

25 May 2014	ES Sétif (Algeria)	1–1	(Tunisia) CS Sfaxien	Sétif
20:30 UTC+1	Belameiri 12'	Report	Maâloul 45+1'	Stadium: Stade 8 Mai 1945; Referee: Badara Diatta (Senegal)

7 June 2014	ES Sétif (Algeria)	1–1	(Libya) Al-Ahly Benghazi	Sétif
21:00 UTC+1	Nadji 44'	Report	Fetori 90+1' (pen.)	Stadium: Stade 8 Mai 1945; Referee: Ali Lemghaifry (Mauritania)

== Squad information ==
=== Playing statistics ===
No.	Pos	Nat	Player	Total		Ligue 1		Algerian Cup		Super Cup		Confederation Cup		Champions League	
No.	Pos	Nat	Player	Apps	Goals	Apps	Goals	Apps	Goals	Apps	Goals	Apps	Goals	Apps	Goals
Goalkeepers
	GK	(Algeria) ALG	Nadjib Ghoul	5	0	4	0	0	0	0	0	1	0	0	0
	GK	(Algeria) ALG	Sofiane Khedairia	38	0	23	0	2	0	1	0	5	0	7	0
	GK	(Algeria) ALG	Abderaouf Belhani	5	0	5	0	0	0	0	0	0	0	0	0
Defenders
	DF	(Algeria) ALG	Riad Benchadi	8	0	5	0	0	0	1	0	2	0	0	0
	DF	(Algeria) ALG	Farid Mellouli	29	0	18	0	2	0	0	0	5	0	4	0
	DF	(Algeria) ALG	Farès Benabderahmane	23	0	16	0	1	0	1	0	4	0	1	0
	DF	(Algeria) ALG	Lyes Boukria	26	1	16	1	1	0	1	0	2	0	6	0
	DF	(Algeria) ALG	Mohamed Khoutir Ziti	35	3	24	2	1	0	0	0	4	1	6	0
	DF	(Algeria) ALG	Abdelghani Demmou	27	1	21	0	1	1	1	0	3	0	1	0
	DF	(Algeria) ALG	Said Arroussi	20	0	9	0	1	0	1	0	2	0	7	0
	DF	(Gabon) GAB	Benjamin Zé Ondo	10	0	7	0	0	0	1	0	0	0	2	0
	DF	(Algeria) ALG	Hichem Aoulmi	6	0	3	0	0	0	0	0	0	0	3	0
	DF	(Algeria) ALG	Sofiane Bouchar	4	0	4	0	0	0	0	0	0	0	0	0
Midfielders
	MF	(Algeria) ALG	Toufik Zerara	32	1	24	1	1	0	1	0	0	0	6	0
	MF	(Algeria) ALG	Kaled Gourmi	36	10	24	7	2	1	1	0	6	2	3	0
	MF	(Algeria) ALG	Mourad Delhoum	18	2	14	1	1	0	0	0	3	1	0	0
	MF	(Algeria) ALG	Amir Karaoui	36	5	23	5	2	0	1	0	5	0	5	0
	MF	(Algeria) ALG	Hacène El Okbi	25	4	16	2	1	0	0	0	3	0	5	2
	MF	(Algeria) ALG	Sid Ali Lamri	36	2	23	2	1	0	0	0	5	0	7	0
	MF	(Algeria) ALG	Mohamed Lagraâ	27	1	16	1	1	0	0	0	5	0	5	0
	MF	(Algeria) ALG	El Hedi Belameiri	30	6	21	1	1	0	1	0	0	0	7	5
	MF	(Algeria) ALG	Akram Djahnit	26	5	14	3	2	1	1	0	5	0	4	1
	MF	(Algeria) ALG	Rachid Ferahi	37	0	23	0	2	0	1	0	5	0	6	0
Forwards
	FW	(Algeria) ALG	Hameur Bouazza	5	0	4	0	0	0	1	0	0	0	0	0
	FW	(France) FRA	Franck-Olivier Madou	5	0	2	0	0	0	0	0	3	0	0	0
	FW	(Algeria) ALG	Mohamed Tiaïba	9	2	7	2	1	0	0	0	0	0	1	0
	FW	(Algeria) ALG	Amine Touahri	27	1	17	1	1	0	0	0	6	0	3	0
	FW	(Algeria) ALG	Laïd Madouni	23	2	18	1	2	1	0	0	3	0	0	0
	FW	(Algeria) ALG	Rachid Nadji	24	11	13	8	1	0	0	0	3	0	7	3
	FW	(Algeria) ALG	Abdelhakim Amokrane	4	0	3	0	0	0	0	0	0	0	1	0
Players transferred out during the season

Last updated: 9 October 2017
Source: fr.soccerway.com

== Transfers ==
=== In ===
Date	Pos	Player	From club	Transfer fee	Source
6 June 2013	DF	(Algeria) Abdelghani Demmou	USM El Harrach	Free transfer	
6 June 2013	MF	(Algeria) Amine Touahri	USM El Harrach	Free transfer	
15 June 2013	MF	(Algeria) Lyes Boukria	CR Belouizdad	Free transfer	
27 June 2013	DF	(Algeria) Farid Mellouli	ASO Chlef	Undisclosed	
30 June 2013	MF	(Gabon) Benjamin Zé Ondo	(Gabon) US Bitam	Undisclosed	
1 July 2013	GK	(Algeria) Abderaouf Belhani	NA Hussein Dey	Free transfer	
1 July 2013	GK	(Algeria) Omar Saadoune	Reserve team	First Professional Contract	
1 July 2013	DF	(Algeria) Sofiane Bouchar	Reserve team	First Professional Contract	
1 July 2013	MF	(Algeria) Hichem Aoulmi	USM Alger Reserve team	Undisclosed	
1 July 2013	MF	(Algeria) Sid Ali Lamri	MSP Batna	Loan Return	
10 July 2013	MF	(Algeria) Toufik Zerara	JSM Béjaïa	Undisclosed	
15 July 2013	MF	(France) (Algeria) El Hedi Belameiri	(France) Amnéville	Free transfer	
24 July 2013	MF	(Algeria) Karim Nemdil	USMM Hadjout	Free transfer	
1 August 2013	FW	(France) (Ivory Coast) Franck Madou	(Bulgaria) PFC Minyor Pernik	Undisclosed	
2 October 2013	MF	(Algeria) Hameur Bouazza	Unattached	Free transfer	
15 January 2014	FW	(Algeria) Mohamed Tiaiba	CA Bordj Bou Arréridj	2,300,000 DA	

=== Out ===
Date	Pos	Player	To club	Transfer fee	Source
17 July 2013	FW	(Algeria) Mohamed Chalali	JSM Béjaïa	Undisclosed	
