= 2015–16 ES Sétif season =

ES Sétif
2015–16 season
- Chairman: Hassan Hammar
- Head coach: Kheirredine Madoui (until 7 November 2015); Alain Geiger (from 14 November 2015)
- Stadium: Stade 8 Mai 1945
- Ligue 1: 5th
- Algerian Cup: Quarter-finals
- Super Cup: winners
- Champions League: 2015: Group stage 2016: Second round
- Top goalscorer: League: Mohamed Benyettou (7); All: Eudes Dagoulou (9)

In the 2015–16 season, ES Sétif competed in the Ligue 1 for the 46th season, as well as the Algerian Cup.

== Squad list ==
Players and squad numbers last updated on 15 August 2015.
Note: Flags indicate national team as has been defined under FIFA eligibility rules. Players may hold more than one non-FIFA nationality.

No.	Nat.	Position	Name	Date Of Birth (Age)	Moving from
Goalkeepers
1	(Algeria)	GK	Sofiane Khedairia	1 April 1989 (aged 26)	(France) Le Mans FC
30	(Algeria)	GK	Abderaouf Belhani	26 November 1986 (aged 28)	(Algeria) NA Hussein Dey
16	(Algeria)	GK	Amar Saadoune	12 December 1992 (aged 22)	(Algeria) Youth system
Defenders
4	(Algeria)	CB	Said Arroussi	23 July 1991 (aged 24)	(Algeria) Youth system
2	(Algeria)	CB	Sofiane Bouchar	21 May 1994 (aged 21)	(Algeria) Youth system
20	(Algeria)	CB	Ryad Kenniche	20 April 1993 (aged 22)	(Algeria) USM El Harrach
12	(Algeria)	LB	Farès Hachi	5 November 1989 (aged 25)	(France) Grenoble Foot 38
17	(Algeria)	CB	Djamel Benlamri	25 December 1989 (aged 25)	(Algeria) JS Kabylie
18	(Algeria)	RB	Amine Megateli	4 May 1987 (aged 28)	(Algeria) JSM Béjaïa
36	(Algeria)	RB	Ayeche Ziouache	20 January 1995 (aged 20)	(Algeria) Youth system
Midfielders
7	(Algeria)	AM	Akram Djahnit	3 April 1991 (aged 24)	(Kuwait) Al-Arabi SC
21	(Algeria)	DM	Issam Baouz	30 November 1990 (aged 24)	(France) Villemomble Sports
25	(Algeria)	DM	Miloud Rebiai	12 December 1993 (aged 21)	(Algeria) WA Tlemcen
26	(Algeria)	AM	El Hedi Belameiri	24 April 1991 (aged 24)	(France) CSO Amnéville
19	(Central African Republic)	AM	Eudes Dagoulou	9 February 1990 (aged 25)	(Algeria) MC Oran
13	(Algeria)	CM	Sid Ali Lamri	3 February 1991 (aged 24)	(Algeria) MSP Batna
24	(Algeria)	DM	Mohamed Billal Rait	16 May 1986 (aged 29)	(Algeria) RC Arbaâ
29	(Algeria)	DM	Toufik Zerara	3 February 1986 (aged 29)	(Algeria) JSM Béjaïa
14	(Algeria)	DM	Mourad Delhoum	2 October 1985 (aged 29)	(Algeria) JS Kabylie
6	(Madagascar)	DM	Ibrahim Amada	28 February 1990 (aged 25)	(Algeria) USM El Harrach
NA	(Algeria)	MF	Mohamed Mekdache	23 January 1995 (aged 20)	(Algeria) Youth system
Forwards
9	(Algeria)	ST	Abdelmalek Ziaya	23 January 1984 (aged 31)	(Algeria) USM Alger
10	(Algeria)	RW	Abdelmoumene Djabou	31 January 1987 (aged 28)	(Tunisia) Club Africain
11	(Algeria)	ST	Mohamed Benyettou	1 November 1989 (aged 25)	(Algeria) MC Oran
12	(Algeria)	ST	Abdelhakim Amokrane	10 May 1994 (aged 21)	(Algeria) DRB Tadjenanet
23	(Algeria)	RW	Zahir Nemdil	3 March 1987 (aged 28)	(Algeria) MO Béjaïa
27	(Algeria)	LW	Zakaria Haddouche	19 August 1993 (aged 21)	(Algeria) ASO Chlef
28	(Algeria)	LW	Ilyes Kourbia	9 November 1992 (aged 22)	(Algeria) MC Oran
37	(Algeria)	ST	Yasser Berbache	8 February 1996 (aged 19)	(Algeria) Youth system
	(Algeria)	LW	Ismaïl Saïdi	4 April 1997 (aged 18)	(Algeria) Youth system

== Transfers ==
=== In ===
Date	Pos	Player	From club	Transfer fee	Source
8 June 2015	MF	(Algeria) (France) Walid Chenine	(France) US Colomiers	Undisclosed	
8 June 2015	FW	(Algeria) (France) Adam Tobbal	(England) Fulham U21	Undisclosed	
10 June 2015	DF	(Algeria) (France) Farès Hachi	(France) Grenoble Foot 38	Undisclosed	
18 June 2015	DF	(Algeria) Miloud Rebiai	WA Tlemcen	€15,000	
2 July 2015	DF	(Algeria) Djamel Benlamri	JS Kabylie	€50,000	
3 July 2015	DF	(Algeria) Ryad Kenniche	USM El Harrach	Free transfer	
12 July 2015	MF	(Algeria) Zakaria Haddouche	ASO Chlef	€40,000	
25 July 2015	MF	(Madagascar) Ibrahim Amada	USM El Harrach	Free transfer	
30 December 2015	MF	(Algeria) Abdelhakim Amokrane	DRB Tadjenanet	Return from loan	
7 January 2016	MF	(Algeria) Abdelmoumene Djabou	(Tunisia) Club Africain	Free transfer	
14 January 2016	MF	(Algeria) Akram Djahnit	(Kuwait) Al-Arabi SC	Undisclosed	

=== Out ===
Date	Pos	Player	To club	Transfer fee	Source
18 June 2015	DF	(Algeria) Abdelghani Demmou	MC Alger	Undisclosed	
29 June 2015	DF	(Algeria) Farid Mellouli	(Saudi Arabia) Al-Qadsiah FC	Undisclosed	
1 July 2015	DF	(Algeria) Mohamed Lagraâ	JS Saoura	Undisclosed	
2 July 2015	MF	(Algeria) Akram Djahnit	(Kuwait) Al-Arabi SC	Undisclosed	
1 January 2016	FW	(Algeria) Merouane Dahar	MC Oran	Free transfer	
10 January 2016	FW	(Algeria) Mohamed Benyettou	(Saudi Arabia) Al Shabab	700,000 $	
11 January 2016	MF	(Algeria) (France) Walid Chenine	RC Relizane	Free transfer	

== Competitions ==
=== Overview ===
Competition	Record								Started round	Final position / round	First match	Last match
Competition	G	W	D	L	GF	GA	GD	Win %	Started round	Final position / round	First match	Last match
Ligue 1	30	11	11	8	31	19	+12	36.67	—N/a	5th	15 August 2015	27 May 2015
Algerian Cup	4	3	0	1	8	6	+2	75.00	Round of 64	Quarter-finals	19 December 2015	4 March 2016
2015 CL1	6	1	2	3	5	10	−5	16.67	Group stage		27 June 2015	11 September 2015
2016 CL1	4	1	3	0	7	5	+2	25.00	Preliminary round	Second round	13 March 2016	19 April 2016
Algerian Super Cup	1	1	0	0	1	0	+1	100.00	Final	winners	1 November 2015	
Total	45	17	16	12	52	40	+12	37.78				

== League table ==
Pos	Team	Pld	W	D	L	GF	GA	GD	Pts	Qualification or relegation
3	JS Kabylie	30	12	9	9	27	27	0	45 (Note: JS Kabylie ahead of CR Belouizdad on head-to-head record: JSK–CRB 1–0, CRB–JSK 1–1.)	Qualification for the Confederation Cup preliminary round
4	CR Belouizdad	30	11	12	7	40	29	+11	45	
5	ES Sétif	30	11	11	8	31	19	+12	44 (Note: ES Sétif ahead of MO Béjaïa on head-to-head record: ESS–MOB 0–0, MOB–ESS 0–0.)	
6	MO Béjaïa	30	11	11	8	33	23	+10	44	
7	DRB Tadjenanet	30	11	10	9	32	30	+2	43	

Updated to match(es) played on 27 May 2016. Source: DZFoot
Rules for classification: 1) points; 2) head-to-head points; 3) head-to-head goal difference; 4) goal difference; 5) total goals; 6) fairplay ranking; 7) playoff.

=== Results summary ===
Overall								Home						Away					
Pld	W	D	L	GF	GA	GD	Pts	W	D	L	GF	GA	GD	W	D	L	GF	GA	GD
30	11	11	8	31	19	+12	44	8	6	1	18	5	+13	3	5	7	13	14	−1

Last updated: 31 January 2015.
Source: Competitive matches

=== Results by round ===
Round	1	2	3	4	5	6	7	8	9	10	11	12	13	14	15	16	17	18	19	20	21	22	23	24	25	26	27	28	29	30
Ground	A	H	A	H	A	H	A	H	A	H	A	H	A	H	A	H	A	H	A	H	A	H	A	H	A	H	A	H	A	H
Result	D	L	W	D	D	D	D	W	W	L	L	L	W	D	D	W	D	L	D	D	W	L	W	L	W	L	W	W	W	D
Position	6	11	9	8	9	7	10	7	4	7	7	9	7	8	9	7	7	8	11	9	8	10	9	11	9	10	7	6	4	5

Updated to match(es) played on 31 January 2015. Source: Competitive matches
A = Away; H = Home; W = Win; D = Draw; L = Loss

=== Matches ===
Win Draw Loss

15 August 2015 Round 1	ES Sétif	1–1	MC Oran	Sétif
17:00	Benyettou 80'	Report; Live TV: None	36' Za'abia	Stadium: Stade 8 Mai 1945; Referee: Amalou, Azrine, Salaouandji

25 August 2015 Round 2	USM Alger	2–1	ES Sétif	Bologhine
18:00	Khoualed 26'; Belaïli 39'	Report; Live TV: Algérie 3 / TV Tamazight 4	90+4' (pen.) Benyettou	Stadium: Stade Omar Hamadi; Referee: Ghorbal, Etchiali, Brahim

29 August 2015 Round 3	ES Sétif	2–1	CS Constantine	Sétif
17:40	Korbiaa 37'; Benyettou 60'	Report; Live TV: Algérie 3	19' Koné	Stadium: Stade 8 Mai 1945; Referee: Boukhalfa, Itchiali, Zerhouni

12 September 2015 Round 4	RC Relizane	1–1	ES Sétif	Relizane
16:30	Manucho 30'	Report; Live TV: None	64' (pen.) Benyettou	Stadium: Stade Tahar Zoughari; Referee: Aouina, Benaïssa, Aouina

19 September 2015 Round 5	ES Sétif	0–0	MO Béjaïa	Sétif
18:00		Report; Live TV: None		Stadium: Stade 8 Mai 1945; Referee: Abid Charef, Itchiali, Gourari

28 September 2015 Round 6	JS Saoura	1–1	ES Sétif]	Béchar
18:00	Zaïdi 28'	Report; Live TV: None	87' (pen.) Benyettou	Stadium: Stade 20 Août 1955; Referee: Ghorbal, Serradj, Cherchar

2 October 2015 Round 7	ES Sétif	0–0	USM Blida	Sétif
18:00		Report; Live TV: None		Stadium: Stade 8 Mai 1945; Referee: Semsoum, Mial, Idir

16 October 2015 Round 8	ASM Oran	0–2	ES Sétif	Oran
16:00		Report; Live TV: TV Tamazight 4 / beIN Sports	40' Benyettou; 76' Nemdil	Stadium: Stade Habib Bouakeul; Referee: Hellalchi, Azrine, Doulache

23 October 2015 Round 9	ES Sétif	1–0	CR Belouizdad	Sétif
17:00	Baouz 63'	Report; Live TV: beIN Sports / Canal Algérie		Stadium: Stade 8 Mai 1945; Referee: Necib, Meghlout, Benacer

27 October 2015 Round 10	DRB Tadjenanet	1–0	ES Sétif	Tadjenanet
15:00	Daouadji 7'	Report; Live TV: None		Stadium: Lahoua Smaïl Stadium; Attendance: 0 (close doors); Referee: Arab, Tamen, Beioud

6 November 2015 Round 11	ES Sétif	0–1	USM El Harrach	Sétif
18:00		Report	80' Bouguèche	Stadium: Stade 8 Mai 1945; Referee: Benouza, Omari, Ayad

20 November 2015 Round 12	NA Hussein Dey	1–0	ES Sétif	Belouizdad
17:00	Benaldjia 4'	Report; Live TV: None		Stadium: Stade 20 Août 1955; Referee: Ghorbane, Benali, Abid

27 November 2015 Round 13	ES Sétif	1–0	RC Arbaâ	Sétif
16:00	Benyettou 14'	Report; Live TV: Canal Algérie		Stadium: Stade 8 Mai 1945; Referee: Boukouassa, Bounoua et Rachedi

12 December 2015 Round 14	JS Kabylie	0–0	ES Sétif	Tizi Ouzou
16:00		Report; Live TV: Algérie 3		Stadium: Stade 1er Novembre 1954; Referee: Arab, Beyoum, Hamlaoui

26 December 2015 Round 15	ES Sétif	0–0	MC Alger	Sétif
16:00		Report; Live TV: Algérie 3		Stadium: Stade 8 Mai 1945; Referee: Ben Brahem, Brahim, Alaoua

15 January 2016 Round 16	MC Oran	1–2	ES Sétif	Oran
16:00	Zubya 26' (pen.)	Report; Live TV: TV Tamazight 4	15' (pen.) Arroussi	Stadium: Stade Ahmed Zabana; Referee: Houasnia, Etchiali, Tazourt

23 January 2016 Round 17	ES Sétif	1–1	USM Alger	Sétif
16:00	Arroussi 43'	Report; Live TV: Canal Algérie / Al Kass Sports	26' Chafaï	Stadium: Stade 8 Mai 1945; Referee: Mial, Itchiali, Serradj

29 January 2016 Round 18	CS Constantine	1–0	ES Sétif	Constantine
16:00	Sameur 46'	Report; Live TV: TV Tamazight 4		Stadium: Stade Mohamed Hamlaoui; Referee: Boukouassa, Bounouioua, Rachedi

5 February 2016 Round 19	ES Sétif	0–0	RC Relizane	Sétif
16:00		Report; Live TV: None		Stadium: Stade 8 Mai 1945; Attendance: 0 (close doors); Referee: Bouslimani, Brahim, Rimous

9 February 2016 Round 20	MO Béjaïa	0–0	ES Sétif	Béjaïa
16:00		Report; Live TV: None		Stadium: Stade de l'Unité Maghrébine; Referee: Abid Charef, Tamen, Boulfelfel

26 February 2016 Round 21	ES Sétif	3–0	JS Saoura	Sétif
16:00	Haddouche 42', 90+2'; Delhoum 63'	Report; Live TV: TV Tamazight 4 / beIN Sports		Stadium: Stade 8 Mai 1945; Referee: Halalchi, Azerine, Doulache

8 March 2016 Round 22	USM Blida	2–1	ES Sétif	Blida
16:00	Chérif 9'; Ounnas 72' (pen.)	Report; Live TV: None	19' Delhoum	Stadium: Stade Frères Brakni; Referee: Aouina Saïd, Djemaï, Aouina Fawzi

26 March 2016 Round 23	ES Sétif	3–1	ASM Oran	Sétif
18:00	Barbach 5', 44'; Belameiri 86'	Report; Live TV: None	77' Ghomari	Stadium: Stade 8 Mai 1945; Referee: Benbraham, Azerin, Brahim

2 April 2016 Round 24	CR Belouizdad	1–0	ES Sétif	Belouizdad
16:00	Feham 9'	Report; Live TV: Algérie 3		Stadium: Stade 20 Août 1955; Referee: Brahimi, Chiballah, Idir

15 April 2016 Round 25	ES Sétif	1–0	DRB Tadjenanet	Sétif
18:00	Dagoulou 45'	Report; Live TV: Canal Algérie		Stadium: Stade 8 Mai 1945; Referee: Benouza, Omari, Ayad

23 April 2016 Round 26	USM El Harrach	1–0	ES Sétif	El Harrach
16:00	Aït Ouamar 52'	Report; Live TV: None		Stadium: Stade 1er Novembre 1954; Attendance: 0 (close doors); Referee: Boukhalfa, Zerhouni, Benali

26 April 2016 Round 27	ES Sétif	3–0	NA Hussein Dey	Sétif
17:00	Ziaya 5' (pen.), 34', 60'	Report; Live TV: None		Stadium: Stade 8 Mai 1945; Referee: Bouzrar, Yahi, Lassami

13 May 2016 Round 28	RC Arbaâ	0–3	ES Sétif	Larbaâ
17:30		Report; Live TV: None	28', 89' Amokrane; 33' Kourbiaa	Stadium: Stade Ismaïl Makhlouf; Referee: Bendebiza, Messali, Belhocine

20 May 2016 Round 29	ES Sétif	2–0	JS Kabylie	Sétif
17:30	Delhoum 36'; Kourbiaa 59'	Report; Live TV: Algérie 3		Stadium: Stade 8 Mai 1945; Referee: Arab, Hamlaoui, Biodh

27 May 2016 Round 30	MC Alger	2–2	ES Sétif	Bologhine
17:30	Derrardja 18'; Hachoud 32'	Report; Live TV: None	52' (pen.) Nemdil; 90+1' Mekdache	Stadium: Stade Omar Hammadi; Referee: Mial, Semsoum, Idir

=== Algerian Cup ===
19 December 2015 Round of 64	ES Sétif	3–1	WR M'Sila	Sétif
14:15	Dagoulou 50'; Kouriba 53'; Saidi 86'		Khelifi 90'	Stadium: Stade 8 Mai 1945; Referee: Bouabdallah, Bouhassoun, Bourchou

9 January 2016 Round of 32	ES Sétif	2–1 (a.e.t.)	CR Belouizdad	Sétif
16:00	Ziaya 7' (pen.); Dagoulou 92'		43' Bougueroua	Stadium: Stade 8 Mai 1945; Referee: Benouza, Oumari, Ayad

20 February 2016 Round of 16	ES Sétif	2–1	RC Arbaâ	Sétif
16:00	Dagoulou 60'; Djahnit 65'		28' Yachir	Stadium: Stade 8 Mai 1945; Referee: Houasnia, Gourari, Tazourt

4 March 2016 Quarter-finals	ES Sétif	1–3	USM Bel-Abbès	Sétif
16:00	Ziaya 48' (pen.)	Live TV: Algérie 3	78' (pen.), 88' Meguehout; 85' Ghezzali	Stadium: Stade 8 Mai 1945; Referee: Boukouassa, Ibrahim, Rachedi

=== Algerian Super Cup ===
1 November 2015	ES Sétif	1–0	MO Béjaïa	Constantine
16:00	Belameiri 84'	Report		Stadium: Stade Mohamed Hamlaoui; Attendance: 15.000; Referee: Mokhtar Amalou

=== 2015 Champions League ===
==== Group stage ====
Pos	Team	Pld	W	D	L	GF	GA	GD	Pts	Qualification	USM	MER	ESS	MCE
1	(Algeria) USM Alger	6	5	0	1	9	3	+6	15	Advance to knockout stage	—	1–0	3–0	2–1
2	(Sudan) Al-Merrikh	6	4	1	1	9	4	+5	13	Advance to knockout stage	1–0	—	2–0	2–0
3	(Algeria) ES Sétif	6	1	2	3	5	10	−5	5		1–2	1–1	—	2–2
4	(Algeria) MC El Eulma	6	0	1	5	5	11	−6	1		0–1	2–3	0–1	—

Source: CAF
Rules for classification: Group stage tiebreakers

11 July 2015 2	MC El Eulma (Algeria)	0–1	(Algeria) ES Sétif	El Eulma
22:30 UTC+1		Report	Mahsas 90' (o.g.)	Stadium: Stade Messaoud Zougar; Referee: Gehad Grisha (Egypt)

25 July 2015 3	ES Sétif (Algeria)	1–1	(Sudan) Al-Merrikh	Sétif
21:30 UTC+1	Ziaya 17'	Report	Jabason 23'	Stadium: Stade 8 Mai 1945; Referee: Daniel Bennett (South Africa)

9 August 2015 4	Al-Merrikh (Sudan)	2–0	(Algeria) ES Sétif	Omdurman
22:00 UTC+3	Yousif 41' (pen.); Okrah 90'	Report		Stadium: Al-Merrikh Stadium; Referee: Joseph Lamptey (Ghana)

21 August 2015 5	USM Alger (Algeria)	3–0	(Algeria) ES Sétif	Algiers
20:30 UTC+1	Belaïli 33'; Beldjilali 37'; Aoudia 74'	Report		Stadium: Stade Omar Hamadi; Referee: Malang Diedhiou (Senegal)

11 September 2015 6	ES Sétif (Algeria)	2–2	(Algeria) MC El Eulma	Sétif
20:30 UTC+1	Belkhiter 61' (o.g.); Dagoulou 78'	Report	Korichi 11'; Abbès 89'	Stadium: Stade 8 Mai 1945; Referee: Joshua Bondo (Botswana)

=== 2016 Champions League ===
==== First round ====
13 March 2016 first leg	Étoile du Congo (Republic of the Congo)	1–1	(Algeria) ES Sétif	Brazzaville
15:30 UTC+1	Kalonji 86' (pen.)		62' Djahnit	Stadium: Stade Alphonse Massemba-Débat; Referee: Denis Batte (Uganda)

20 March 2016 Second leg	ES Sétif (Algeria)	4–2	(Republic of the Congo) Étoile du Congo	Sétif
18:00 UTC+1	Dagoulou 3', 49', 65'; Amokrane 31'		33' Matondo; 34' Issambet	Stadium: Stade 8 Mai 1945; Attendance: 8,000; Referee: Sadok Selmi (Tunisia)

==== Second round ====
9 April 2016 first leg	Al-Merrikh (Sudan)	2–2	(Algeria) ES Sétif	Omdurman
20:00 UTC+3	Abdel-Aati 34', 54'		15' Dagoulou; 37' Djabou	Stadium: Al-Merrikh Stadium; Referee: Joshua Bondo (Botswana)

19 April 2016 Second leg	ES Sétif (Algeria)	0–0	(Sudan) Al-Merrikh	Sétif
19:00 UTC+1				Stadium: Stade 8 Mai 1945; Referee: Bakary Gassama (Gambia)

== Squad information ==
=== Appearances and goals ===
No.	Pos	Player	Nat	Ligue 1			Algerian Cup			2015 CL1			2016 CL1			Super Cup			Total		
No.	Pos	Player	Nat	App	St	G	App	St	G	App	St	G	App	St	G	App	St	G	App	St	G
Goalkeepers
1	GK	Sofiane Khedairia	(Algeria)	22	22	0	3	3	0	3	3	0	3	3	0	1	1	0	32	32	0
16	GK	Amar Saadoune	(Algeria)	0	0	0	1	0	0	0	0	0	0	0	0	0	0	0	1	0	0
30	GK	Abderaouf Belhani	(Algeria)	8	8	0	1	1	0	2	2	0	1	1	0	0	0	0	12	12	0
Defenders
5	DF	Said Arroussi	(Algeria)	16	15	3	4	4	0	5	4	0	2	2	0	0	0	0	27	25	3
2	DF	Sofiane Bouchar	(Algeria)	21	19	0	4	3	0	4	4	0	4	3	0	1	1	0	34	30	0
20	DF	Ryad Kenniche	(Algeria)	13	13	0	1	1	0	1	1	0	2	2	0	1	1	0	18	18	0
12	DF	Farès Hachi	(Algeria)	23	23	0	3	3	0	4	3	0	4	4	0	1	1	0	35	34	0
17	DF	Djamel Benlamri	(Algeria)	17	15	0	1	1	0	0	0	0	4	4	0	1	1	0	23	21	0
18	DF	Amine Megateli	(Algeria)	18	14	0	4	4	0	3	3	0	0	0	0	0	0	0	25	21	0
36	DF	Ayeche Ziouache	(Algeria)	4	2	0	1	0	0	1	1	0	1	0	0	0	0	0	7	3	0
Midfielders
6	MF	Ibrahim Amada	(Madagascar)	22	20	0	4	4	0	0	0	0	4	4	0	1	1	0	31	29	0
7	MF	Akram Djahnit	(Algeria)	12	12	0	2	2	1	0	0	0	4	4	1	0	0	0	18	18	2
13	MF	Sid Ali Lamri	(Algeria)	24	15	0	2	2	0	5	5	0	1	0	0	1	1	0	33	23	0
14	MF	Mourad Delhoum	(Algeria)	18	18	3	2	2	0	3	3	0	0	0	0	1	0	0	24	23	3
19	MF	Eudes Dagoulou	(Central African Republic)	18	10	1	4	3	3	3	2	1	4	4	4	1	1	0	30	20	9
21	MF	Issam Baouz	(Algeria)	9	9	1	0	0	0	3	3	0	3	0	0	1	1	0	16	13	1
23	MF	Zahir Nemdil	(Algeria)	14	6	2	1	0	0	5	3	0	0	0	0	0	0	0	20	9	2
24	MF	Mohamed Billal Rait	(Algeria)	8	5	0	3	1	0	2	1	0	0	0	0	0	0	0	13	7	0
25	MF	Miloud Rebiai	(Algeria)	12	12	0	0	0	0	0	0	0	3	3	0	0	0	0	15	15	0
26	MF	El Hedi Belameiri	(Algeria)	17	10	1	1	1	0	3	2	0	0	0	0	1	0	1	22	13	2
29	MF	Toufik Zerara	(Algeria)	24	20	0	2	2	0	2	1	0	4	4	0	0	0	0	32	27	0
NA	MF	Mohamed Mekdache	(Algeria)	3	1	1	0	0	0	0	0	0	0	0	0	0	0	0	3	1	1
NA	MF	Yanis Rafik Bessam	(Algeria)	1	0	0	0	0	0	0	0	0	0	0	0	0	0	0	1	0	0
NA	MF	Mehdi Boubakour	(Algeria)	2	0	0	0	0	0	0	0	0	0	0	0	0	0	0	2	0	0
Forwards
9	FW	Abdelmalek Ziaya	(Algeria)	12	8	3	3	3	2	4	2	1	2	0	0	1	0	0	22	13	6
10	FW	Abdelmoumene Djabou	(Algeria)	5	3	0	2	0	0	0	0	0	3	2	1	0	0	0	10	5	1
12	FW	Abdelhakim Amokrane	(Algeria)	11	9	2	1	0	0	0	0	0	2	1	1	0	0	0	14	10	3
27	FW	Zakaria Haddouche	(Algeria)	19	16	2	3	2	0	0	0	0	3	3	0	1	1	0	26	22	2
28	FW	Ilyes Korbiaa	(Algeria)	15	6	3	1	1	1	3	2	0	0	0	0	0	0	0	19	9	4
37	FW	Yasser Berbache	(Algeria)	5	3	2	0	0	0	0	0	0	0	0	0	0	0	0	5	3	2
22	FW	Ismaïl Saïdi	(Algeria)	2	1	0	1	0	1	0	0	0	1	0	0	0	0	0	4	1	1
NA	FW	Mansour Benothmane	(Algeria)	0	0	0	0	0	0	0	0	0	1	0	0	0	0	0	1	0	0
Players transferred out during the season
~~7~~	MF	Walid Chenine	(Algeria)	4	1	0	0	0	0	4	3	0	–	–	–	0	0	0	8	4	0
~~15~~	MF	Merouane Dahar	(Algeria)	4	1	0	0	0	0	3	2	0	–	–	–	0	0	0	7	3	0
~~11~~	FW	Mohamed Benyettou	(Algeria)	14	13	7	1	1	0	5	3	0	–	–	–	1	1	0	21	18	7
~~12~~	CB	Farid Mellouli	(Algeria)	–	–	–	–	–	–	1	1	0	–	–	–	–	–	–	1	1	0
~~5~~	CF	Sofiane Younes	(Algeria)	–	–	–	–	–	–	1	1	0	–	–	–	–	–	–	1	1	0
Total				30		31	4		8	6		5	4		7	1		1	45		52

Last updated: 27 May 2016
Source: soccerway.com

=== Goalscorers ===
Includes all competitive matches.

No.	Nat.	Player	Pos.	L1	AC	SC	CL1	TOTAL
19	(Central African Republic)	Eudes Dagoulou	MF	1	3	0	5	9
11	(Algeria)	Mohamed Benyettou	FW	7	0	0	0	7
9	(Algeria)	Abdelmalek Ziaya	FW	3	2	0	1	6
28	(Algeria)	Ilyes Korbiaa	FW	3	1	0	0	4
12	(Algeria)	Abdelhakim Amokrane	FW	2	0	0	1	3
14	(Algeria)	Mourad Delhoum	MF	3	0	0	0	3
5	(Algeria)	Said Arroussi	DF	3	0	0	0	3
27	(Algeria)	Zakaria Haddouche	FW	2	0	0	0	2
37	(Algeria)	Yasser Berbache	FW	2	0	0	0	2
7	(Algeria)	Akram Djahnit	MF	0	1	0	1	2
23	(Algeria)	Zahir Nemdil	MF	2	0	0	0	2
26	(Algeria)	El Hedi Belameiri	MF	1	0	0	0	1
10	(Algeria)	Abdelmoumene Djabou	FW	0	0	0	1	1
22	(Algeria)	Ismaïl Saïdi	FW	0	1	0	0	1
21	(Algeria)	Issam Baouz	MF	1	0	0	0	1
NA	(Algeria)	Mohamed Mekdache	MF	1	0	0	0	1
Own Goals				0	0	0	2	2
Totals				31	8	1	11	51
