= 2015 CAF Super Cup =

2015 Orange CAF Super Cup
ES Sétif	Al-Ahly
(Algeria)	(Egypt)
1	1
- ES Sétif won 6–5 on penalties
- Date: 21 February 2015
- Venue: Stade Mustapha Tchaker, Blida
- Referee: Noumandiez Doué (Ivory Coast)
- Attendance: 15,000
- Weather: Cloudy; 8 °C (46 °F); 71% humidity

The 2015 CAF Super Cup (officially the 2015 Orange CAF Super Cup for sponsorship reasons) was the 23rd CAF Super Cup, an annual football match in Africa organized by the Confederation of African Football (CAF), between the winners of the previous season's two CAF club competitions, the CAF Champions League and the CAF Confederation Cup.

The match was played between ES Sétif of Algeria, the 2014 CAF Champions League winner, and Al-Ahly of Egypt, the 2014 CAF Confederation Cup winner. It was hosted by ES Sétif at the Stade Mustapha Tchaker in Blida on 21 February 2015.

After a 1–1 draw, ES Sétif won 6–5 on penalties to become the first Algerian team to win the CAF Super Cup since the creation of the competition in 1993.

== Teams ==
Team	Qualification	Previous participation (bold indicates winners)
(Algeria) ES Sétif	2014 CAF Champions League winner	None
(Egypt) Al-Ahly	2014 CAF Confederation Cup winner	1994, **2002**, **2006**, **2007**, **2009**, **2013**, **2014**

== Rules ==
The CAF Super Cup was played as a single match, with the CAF Champions League winner hosting the match. If the score was tied at the end of regulation, the penalty shoot-out would be used to determine the winner (no extra time would be played).

== Match ==
21 February 2015
16:00 UTC+1

Entente Setifienne (Algeria)	1–1	(Egypt) Al-Ahly
Abdel Malek Ziaya 71'	Report	Emad Moteab 90'+5'
Penalties
Delhoum (penalty scored); Mellouli (penalty scored); Benyettou (penalty scored); Dagoulou (penalty scored); Belameiri (penalty scored); Lamri (penalty scored)	6–5	(penalty scored) M.Zakaria; (penalty scored) A. Said; (penalty scored) Moteab; (penalty scored) Samir; (penalty scored) Trezeguet; (penalty missed) Ali

Stade Mustapha Tchaker, Blida
Attendance: 15,000
Referee: Noumandiez Doué (Ivory Coast)

**ES Sétif**	**Al-Ahly**

GK	1	(Algeria) Sofiane Khedairia
DF	4	(Algeria) Said Arroussi
DF	17	(Gabon) Benjamin Zé Ondo
DF	24	(Algeria) Amine Megateli
DF	3	(Algeria) Farid Mellouli (c)
MF	29	(Algeria) Toufik Zerara
MF	10	(Algeria) Akram Djahnit
MF	7	(Algeria) Mourad Delhoum		(substituted off) 67'
MF	25	(Algeria) El Hedi Belameiri
FW	8	(Algeria) Ahmed Gasmi		(substituted off) 53'
FW	9	(Algeria) Abdelmalek Ziaya	(yellow card) 41'	(substituted off) 90'
Substitutes:
GK	30	(Algeria) Abderaouf Belhani
DF	26	(Algeria) Mohamed Sofiane Bouchar
DF	19	(Central African Republic) Eudes Dagoulou		(substituted on) 67'
MF	16	(Algeria) Billel Raït
MF	5	(Algeria) Sofiane Younès
FW	13	(Algeria) Sid Ali Lamri		(substituted on) 90'
FW	11	(Algeria) Mohamed Benyettou		(substituted on) 53'
Manager:
(Algeria) Kheirredine Madoui

GK	1	(Egypt) Sherif Ekramy
RB	24	(Egypt) Basem Ali
CB	20	(Egypt) Saad Samir
CB	23	(Egypt) Mohamed Nagieb
LB	7	(Egypt) Hussein El Sayed
CM	25	(Egypt) Hossam Ashour	(yellow card) 19'
CM	14	(Egypt) Hossam Ghaly (c)		(substituted off) 59'
RW	11	(Egypt) Walid Soliman		(substituted off) 83'
AM	19	(Egypt) Abdallah El Said
LW	27	(Egypt) Trézéguet	(yellow card) 49'
CF	21	(Egypt) Ahmed Abd El-Zaher
Substitutes:
GK	13	(Egypt) Ahmed Adel Abd El-Moneam
MF	5	(Egypt) Moamen Zakaria		(substituted on) 59'
MF	28	(Egypt) Ramadan Sobhi
FW	10	(Egypt) Emad Moteab		(substituted on) 83'
FW	16	(Nigeria) Peter Ebimobowei
MF	26	(Egypt) Mohamed Ahmed Youssef
Manager:
(Spain) Juan Carlos Garrido

Assistant referees:
Songuifolo Yeo (Ivory Coast)
Jean Claude Birumushahu (Burundi)
Fourth official:
Thierry Nkurunziza (Burundi)
