= Yousfi (surname) =

Notable people with the surname Yousfi include:

- Abderrahmane Yousfi (born 1994), Algerian footballer
- Mohamed Ali Yousfi (born 1950), Tunisian writer and translator
- Mohamed El Yousfi (born 1991), Moroccan footballer
- Mushtaq Ahmed Yousfi (1923–2018), Pakistani satire writer
- Omar Yousfi (born 1956), Algerian weightlifter
- Youcef Yousfi (born 1941), Algerian politician, Minister of Energy and Mines in 2010–2015
