= Mellouli =

Mellouli is a surname. Notable people with the surname include:

- Farid Mellouli (born 1984), Algerian association football player
- Oussama Mellouli (born 1984), Tunisian swimmer
