= Akram Djahnit =

Algerian footballer (born 1991)

Personal information
- Date of birth: 3 April 1991 (age 35)
- Place of birth: Sétif, Algeria
- Height: 1.77 m (5 ft 10 in)
- Position: Midfielder

Team information
- Current team: ES Ben Aknoun
- Number: 25

Youth career
- –2010: ES Sétif

Senior career*
| Years | Team | Apps | (Gls) |
| 2010–2015 | ES Sétif | 122 | (20) |
| 2015–2016 | Al-Arabi | 11 | (6) |
| 2016–2022 | ES Sétif | 198 | (32) |
| 2022–2024 | USM Alger | 66 | (5) |
| 2024–2026 | ES Sétif | 32 | (7) |
| 2026– | ES Ben Aknoun | 0 | (0) |

International career
| 2011 | Algeria U23 | 1 | (0) |
| 2023 | Algeria | 2 | (0) |
- * Club domestic league appearances and goals as of 19 August 2026

Akram Djahnit (Arabic: أكرم جحنيط; born 3 April 1991) is an Algerian football player who plays as a Midfielder for ES Ben Aknoun.

== Club career ==
=== ES Sétif ===
Born in Sétif, Djahnit began his career in the youth ranks of his hometown club ES Sétif. In 2010, he was a member of Sétif under-20 team that won the Algerian Junior Cup, beating CR Belouizdad 12–11 in the penalty shoot-out in the final after the game had ended 0-0. On 18 June 2011 Djahnit made his professional debut for the club as a starter in a league match against AS Khroub. A week later, on 25 June 2011, he scored his first goal for ES Sétif in a 3–1 loss to CA Bordj Bou Arréridj.

=== Al-Arabi SC ===
In July 2015, Djahnit signed a two-year contract with Kuwaiti club Al-Arabi. He scored his first goal in a 1–0 win versus Al-nasr in the league on 11 November 2015. In January 2016, Djahnit reached a mutual agreement with Al-Arabi to terminate his contract.

=== ES Sétif ===
After terminating his contract with Al-Arabi, Djahnit returned to his former club ES Sétif.

=== USM Alger ===
On 22 August 2022, former ES Sétif captain Akram Djahnit has just signed with USM Alger for the next two seasons as the Latest recruits, Djahnit decided to submitting his case to the National Dispute Resolution Chamber which agreed with him, therefore terminating his contract. On 3 June 2023, Djahnit won the first title with USM Alger by winning the 2022–23 CAF Confederation Cup after defeating Young Africans of Tanzania, Djahnit became the first Algerian player to win all possible titles locally and continentally. Considered one of the most prominent recruits of USM Alger in the summer of 2022, Djahnit had a season far beyond expectations and had enough opportunity to play with either Boualem Charef or Abdelhak Benchikha, but without being able to reach his best levels and his performance was not the same as he was presenting with ES Sétif. On 15 September 2023, Djahnit won the CAF Super Cup title after winning against Al Ahly, it is the second African title in three months.

On 28 January 2024, Akram Djahnit scored his first goal with USM Alger against NC Magra in the Ligue 1 from a direct foul. On 8 March 2024, Djahnit scored the first hat-trick in his football career against MB Rouissat in the Algerian Cup in a match that ended with a record score of 8–0. Djahnit although his level was not satisfactory and the fans did not accept his participation in the matches, coach Juan Carlos Garrido insists on relying on him.

=== ES Sétif ===
On 21 July 2024, he returned to ES Sétif.

=== ES Ben Aknoun ===
On 18 August 2026, he joined ES Ben Aknoun.

== International career ==
On 23 September 2011 Djahnit was called up by Azzedine Aït Djoudi to the Algerian Under-23 National Team for a two-week training camp at the Algerian Football Federation's training facilities in Sidi Moussa. He has 1 cap for the team.

== Career statistics ==
=== Club ===
As of 14 June 2024

| Club | Season | League | | | Cup | | Continental | | Other | | Total | |
| Club | Season | Division | Apps | Goals | Apps | Goals | Apps | Goals | Apps | Goals | Apps | Goals |
|---|---|---|---|---|---|---|---|---|---|---|---|---|
| ES Sétif | 2010–11 | Ligue 1 | 6 | 1 | 1 | 0 | — | | — | | 7 | 1 |
| ES Sétif | 2011–12 | Ligue 1 | 20 | 1 | 2 | 0 | 2 (Note: All appearance(s) in CAF Confederation Cup) | 0 | — | | 24 | 1 |
| ES Sétif | 2012–13 | Ligue 1 | 24 | 5 | 5 | 2 | 5 (Note: Two appearances in CAF Confederation Cup, three appearances and one goal in CAF Champions League) | 1 | — | | 34 | 8 |
| ES Sétif | 2013–14 | Ligue 1 | 14 | 3 | 2 | 1 | 9 (Note: Five appearances in CAF Confederation Cup, four appearances and one goal in CAF Champions League) | 1 | 1 (Note: All appearances in Algerian Super Cup) | 0 | 26 | 5 |
| ES Sétif | 2014–15 | Ligue 1 | 23 | 3 | 4 | 0 | 10 (Note: Seven appearances and three goals in CAF Champions League, one appearance in CAF Super Cup, two appearances in FIFA Club World Cup) | 3 | — | | 37 | 6 |
| ES Sétif | Total | | 87 | 13 | 14 | 3 | 26 | 5 | 1 | 0 | 128 | 21 |
| Al-Arabi | 2015–16 | KPL | 11 | 2 | — | | — | | — | | 11 | 2 |
| ES Sétif | 2015–16 | Ligue 1 | 12 | 0 | 2 | 0 | 5 (Note: All appearance(s) in Champions League) | 1 | — | | 19 | 2 |
| ES Sétif | 2016–17 | Ligue 1 | 27 | 8 | 5 | 1 | — | | — | | 32 | 9 |
| ES Sétif | 2017–18 | Ligue 1 | 24 | 0 | 2 | 0 | 5 | 2 | 1 | 0 | 32 | 2 |
| ES Sétif | 2018–19 | Ligue 1 | 25 | 3 | 4 | 1 | 7 | 1 | 4 (Note: All appearance(s) in Arab Club Champions Cup) | 0 | 40 | 5 |
| ES Sétif | 2019–20 | Ligue 1 | 18 | 3 | 4 | 1 | — | | — | | 22 | 4 |
| ES Sétif | 2020–21 | Ligue 1 | 18 | 5 | — | | 6 | 1 | — | | 24 | 6 |
| ES Sétif | 2021–22 | Ligue 1 | 25 | 5 | — | | 13 | 2 | — | | 38 | 7 |
| ES Sétif | Total | | 149 | 24 | 17 | 3 | 36 | 7 | 5 | 0 | 207 | 34 |
| USM Alger | 2022–23 | Ligue 1 | 24 | 0 | — | | 10 | 0 | — | | 34 | 0 |
| USM Alger | 2023–24 | Ligue 1 | 23 | 1 | 5 | 4 | 4 | 0 | — | | 32 | 5 |
| USM Alger | Total | | 47 | 1 | 5 | 4 | 14 | 0 | — | | 66 | 5 |
| Career total | | | 294 | 40 | 36 | 10 | 76 | 12 | 6 | 0 | 412 | 62 |

== Honours ==
ES Sétif

- Algerian Ligue Professionnelle 1: 2011–12, 2012–13, 2014–15, 2016–17
- Algerian Cup: 2011–12
- Algerian Super Cup: 2017
- CAF Champions League: 2014
- CAF Super Cup: 2015

USM Alger

- CAF Confederation Cup: 2022–23
- CAF Super Cup: 2023
