= Mohamed El Yousfi =

Moroccan footballer

Personal information
- Full name: Mohamed El Yousfi
- Date of birth: 18 January 1991 (age 35)
- Place of birth: Casablanca, Morocco
- Height: 1.84 m (6 ft 0 in)
- Position: Goalkeeper

Team information
- Current team: Moghreb Tétouan

Mohamed El Yousfi is a Moroccan professional footballer, who plays as a goalkeeper for Moghreb Tétouan.

== International career ==
In January 2014, coach Hassan Benabicha, invited him to be a part of the Moroccan squad for the 2014 African Nations Championship. He helped the team to top group B after drawing with Burkina Faso and Zimbabwe and defeating Uganda. The team was eliminated from the competition at the quarter final zone after losing to Nigeria.
