= Mohamed Lagraâ =

Algerian footballer (born 1986)

Personal information
- Full name: Mohamed Lagraâ
- Date of birth: November 7, 1986 (age 40)
- Place of birth: Aïn Kermes, Algeria
- Height: 1.78 m (5 ft 10 in)
- Positions: Left-back; defensive midfielder

Team information
- Current team: JSM Tiaret
- Number: 6

Senior career*
Years	Team	Apps	(Gls)
2009–2010	JSM Tiaret	–	(–)
2010–2012	USM El Harrach	53	(1)
2012–2015	ES Sétif	60	(1)
2015–2017	JS Saoura	42	(0)
2017–2019	USM Bel Abbès	24	(0)
2019–2023	MC Oran	101	(0)
2023–	JSM Tiaret	1	(0)
- * Club domestic league appearances and goals as of 29 September 2023

Mohamed Lagraâ (Arabic: محمد لقرع; born November 7, 1986, in Aïn Kermes) is an Algerian footballer who plays for Algerian Ligue 2 club JSM Tiaret. He can play as a left-back or a defensive midfielder.

During his time with ES Sétif, Lagraâ won the Algerian Ligue Professionnelle 1 in 2012–13 and the 2014 CAF Champions League.

== Honours ==
=== Club ===
ES Sétif

- Algerian Ligue Professionnelle 1: 2012–13, 2014–15
- CAF Champions League: 2014
- CAF Super Cup: 2015

USM Bel Abbès

- Algerian Cup: 2018
- Algerian Super Cup : 2018
