= Benjamin Zé Ondo =

Gabonese footballer

Personal information
- Full name: Benjamin Parfait Zé Ondo
- Date of birth: June 18, 1987 (age 39)
- Height: 1.83 m (6 ft 0 in)
- Positions: Left back; left midfielder

Team information
- Current team: Mosta

Senior career*
Years	Team	Apps	(Gls)
2009–2013	US Bitam	-	(-)
2013–2015	ES Sétif	14	(0)
2015–2016	Moloudia Oujda	6	(0)
2016	Wydad Casablanca	7	(0)
2017	Mosta		

International career^{‡}
2011–	Gabon	20	(0)
- * Club domestic league appearances and goals as of 00:00, June 22, 2013 (EST) ‡ National team caps and goals as of 00:00, December 14, 2016 (EST)

Benjamin Zé Ondo (born June 18, 1987) is a Gabonese international football player who is currently playing for Mosta F.C., based in Mosta, Malta.

Before Mosta, he last played for Wydad Casablanca of Morocco. He has also played in the Algerian Ligue Professionnelle 1 for club ES Sétif.

== Club career ==
After signing for Algerian club ES Sétif in the summer of 2013, Zé Ondo had to wait until December to be qualified to play for the club. On December 28, 2013, he made his debut for the club as a starter against USM Alger in the 15th round of the 2013–14 Algerian Ligue Professionnelle 1.

== Honours ==
ES Sétif

- CAF Champions League: 2014
- CAF Super Cup: 2015
- Algerian Ligue Professionnelle 1: 2014–15
