= Sid Ali Lamri =

Algerian footballer (born 1991)

Personal information
- Full name: Sid Ali Lamri
- Date of birth: February 3, 1991 (age 35)
- Place of birth: Aïn Azel, Algeria
- Height: 1.76 m (5 ft 9 in)
- Position: Central midfielder

Team information
- Current team: NC Magra

Youth career
- –2010: ES Sétif

Senior career*
Years	Team	Apps	(Gls)
2010–2017	ES Sétif	103	(2)
2012–2013	→ MSP Batna (loan)		
2017–2021	CS Constantine	102	(11)
2021–2022	HB Chelghoum Laïd	33	(1)
2023–2024	USM Khenchela	40	(2)
2024–2025	Olympique Akbou	25	(0)
2025–2026	ES Mostaganem	20	(0)
2026–	NC Magra	0	(0)
- * Club domestic league appearances and goals as of 5 August 2026

Sid Ali Lamri (Arabic: سيد علي العمري; born February 3, 1991) is an Algerian professional football player who plays for NC Magra. He plays primarily as a central midfielder.

== Club career ==
Born in Sétif, Lamri started his career in the youth ranks of his hometown club ES Sétif. In 2008, Lamri was a member of Sétif's under-17 team that won the Algerian U17 Cup, and followed that up two years later with the Algerian U20 Cup trophy with Setif's under-20 team.

In 2014, Lamri played a key role in Sétif's 2014 CAF Champions League triumph, starting in first the leg of the final against AS Vita Club, which ended 2-2, and coming as a substitute in the return leg.

On 25 July 2024, he joined Olympique Akbou.

On 24 July 2025, he joined ES Mostaganem.

In August 2026, he joined NC Magra.

== Honours ==
ES Sétif

- CAF Champions League (1): 2014
- CAF Super Cup: 2015
- Algerian Ligue 1 (2): 2014–15, 2016–17

CS Constantine

- Algerian Ligue 1 (1): 2017–18
