= Lyes Boukria =

Algerian football player (born 1981)

Personal information
- Full name: Lyes Boukria
- Date of birth: 9 September 1981 (age 45)
- Place of birth: Algiers, Algeria
- Height: 1.80 m (5 ft 11 in)
- Position: Defender

Team information
- Current team: ES Sétif
- Number: 25

Senior career*
Years	Team	Apps	(Gls)
2006–2007	WA Boufarik	-	(-)
2007–2008	NA Hussein Dey	-	(-)
2008–2010	JS Kabylie	-	(-)
2010–2013	CR Belouizdad	77	(0)
2013–	ES Sétif	2	(0)
- * Club domestic league appearances and goals as of 00:00, 21 September 2013 (UTC)

Lyes Boukria (Arabic: إلياس بوكريعة; born 9 September 1981) is an Algerian football player who is currently playing as a defender for ES Sétif in the Algerian Ligue Professionnelle 1.
