= Issam Baouz =

Algerian footballer (born 1990)

Personal information
- Full name: Issam Baouz
- Date of birth: November 30, 1990 (age 35)
- Place of birth: France
- Height: 1.83 m (6 ft 0 in)
- Position: Midfielder

Team information
- Current team: JA Drancy

Senior career*
Years	Team	Apps	(Gls)
2010–2011	Les Lilas	7	(0)
2012–2014	Villemomble Sports	56	(4)
2014–2017	ES Sétif	12	(1)
2017–2018	US Créteil B	7	(0)
2018–2019	Le Mée-sur-Seine SF	17	(0)
2019–	JA Drancy	7	(0)
- * Club domestic league appearances and goals as of 22:39, 17 November 2019 (UTC)

Issam Baouz (born November 30, 1990) is an Algerian footballer who plays for JA Drancy in the Championnat National 1. Besides France, he has played in Algeria.

Baouz was a member of ES Sétif's squad at the 2014 FIFA Club World Cup in Morocco.
