= Said Arroussi =

Algerian footballer (born 1991)

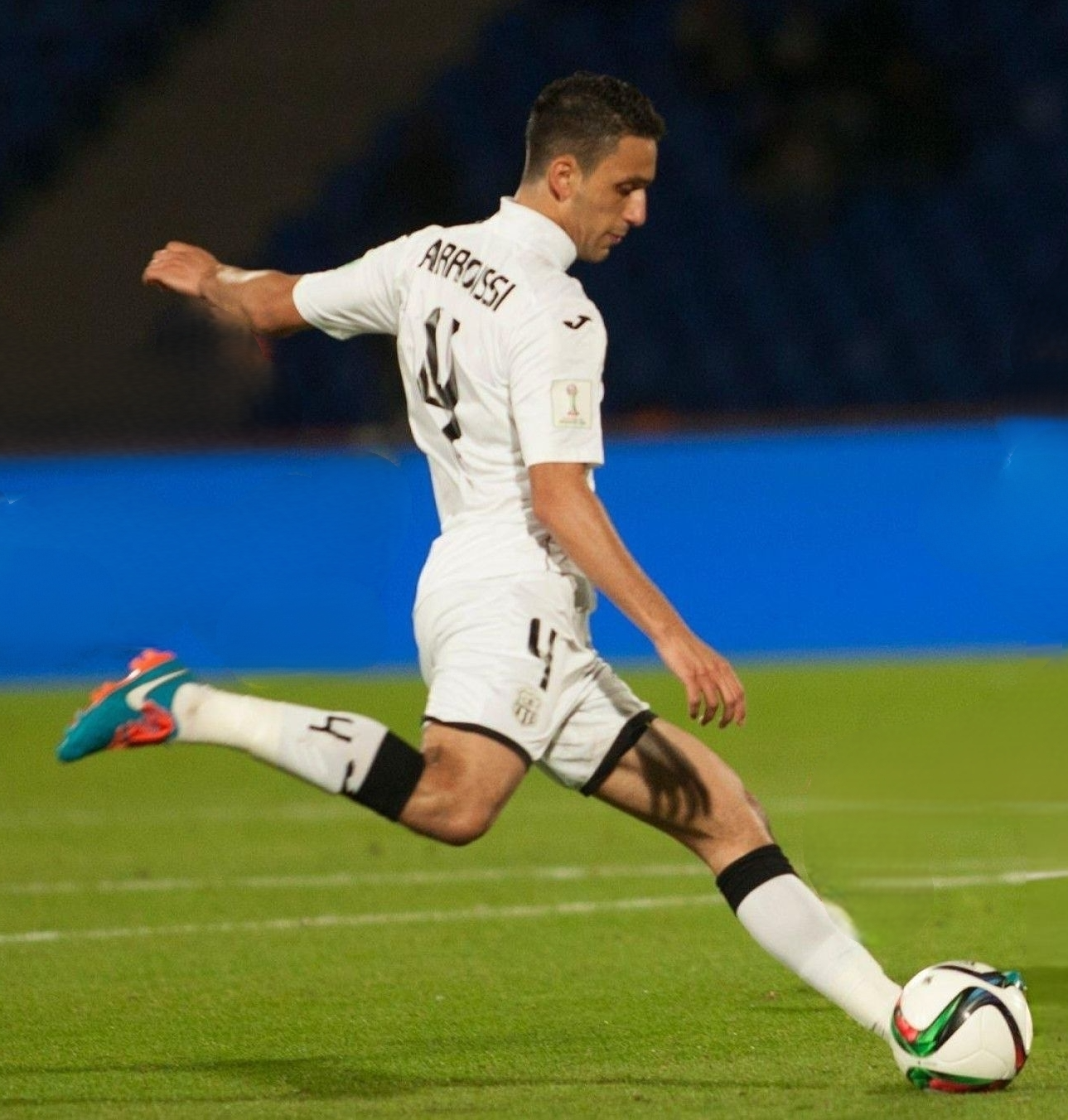
- Said kicking the ball

Personal information
- Full name: Said Kheireddine Arroussi
- Date of birth: July 23, 1991 (age 35)
- Place of birth: Sétif, Algeria
- Height: 1.85 m (6 ft 1 in)
- Position: Centre-back

Team information
- Current team: CA Bordj Bou Arréridj
- Number: 5

Youth career
- ES Sétif

Senior career*
Years	Team	Apps	(Gls)
2011–2017	ES Sétif	55	(3)
2017–2019	CS Constantine	38	(2)
2019–	CA Bordj Bou Arréridj	17	(3)
- * Club domestic league appearances and goals as of 18 July 2020

Said Kheireddine Arroussi (born July 23, 1991) is an Algerian footballer who plays as a centre-back for Algerian Ligue Professionnelle 1 club CA Bordj Bou Arréridj.

== Club career ==
In December 2014, Arroussi was a member of the ES Sétif squad that participated in the 2014 FIFA Club World Cup in Morocco, starting in both of Sétif's matches in the competition. Two months later, in February 2015, he was a starter in Sétif's CAF Super Cup triumph over Egypt's Al Ahly, playing the entire match.

== Honours ==
=== Club ===
ES Sétif

- CAF Champions League: 2014
- CAF Super Cup: 2015
- Algerian Ligue Professionnelle 1: 2014–15, 2016–17

CS Constantine

- Algerian Ligue 1 (1): 2017–18
