= Mohamed Benyettou =

Algerian footballer (born 1989)

Personal information
- Full name: Mohamed Benyettou
- Date of birth: November 1, 1989 (age 37)
- Place of birth: Mohammadia, Algeria
- Height: 1.86 m (6 ft 1 in)
- Position: Forward

Senior career*
Years	Team	Apps	(Gls)
2007–2011	SA Mohammadia	41	(12)
2011–2012	USM El Harrach	24	(3)
2012–2014	MC Oran	44	(10)
2014–2016	ES Sétif	41	(13)
2016–2018	Al-Shabab	57	(22)
2018–2019	Al-Fujairah	24	(14)
2019–2024	Al-Wakrah	103	(51)
2024–2026	Al-Sailiya	26	(6)
- * Club domestic league appearances and goals as of 23:00, 8 December 2024 (EST)

Mohamed Benyettou (Arabic: محمد بن يطو; born November 1, 1989, in Mohammadia, Mascara) is an Algerian footballer who plays as a forward. He specializes as a striker but can also play as the teams holding attacking midfielder, central forward and at times he has been deployed as their winger including a game winning cross against Al Ittihad in 2018

== Club career ==
=== ES Sétif ===
In June 2014, Benyettou signed a two-year contract with ES Sétif. A month later, he made his debut for the club against Ahly Benghazi in the group stage of the 2014 CAF Champions League, coming on as a 68th-minute substitute for Abdelmalek Ziaya.

=== Al-Shabab ===
In January 2016, Benyettou joined Saudi Professional League club Al Shabab.

== Career statistics ==
As of match played 8 December 2024

Club	Season	League			National cup (Note: Includes Algerian Cup, King's Cup, Emir of Qatar Cup)		League cup (Note: Includes Saudi Crown Prince Cup, Qatar Cup)		Continental		Other		Total	
Club	Season	Division	Apps	Goals	Apps	Goals	Apps	Goals	Apps	Goals	Apps	Goals	Apps	Goals
USM El Harrach	2011–12	Algerian Ligue 1	24	3	1	0	–		–		–		25	4
MC Oran	2012–13	Algerian Ligue 1	16	4	5	4	–		–		–		21	8
MC Oran	2013–14	Algerian Ligue 1	28	6	4	0	–		–		–		32	6
MC Oran	Total		68	13	10	4	–		–		–		78	17
ES Sétif	2014–15	Algerian Ligue 1	27	6	2	1	–		12 (Note: Appearances in CAF Champions League)	2	2 (Note: One appearance in FIFA Club World Cup, one appearance in CAF Super Cup)	0	43	9
ES Sétif	2015–16	Algerian Ligue 1	15	7	1	0	–		4	0	1 (Note: Appearance in Algerian Super Cup)	0	21	7
ES Sétif	Total		42	13	3	1	–		16	2	3	0	64	16
Al Shabab	2015–16	Saudi Pro League	13	6	2	2	–		–		–		15	8
Al Shabab	2016–17	Saudi Pro League	22	10	0	0	3	5	–		–		25	15
Al Shabab	2017–18	Saudi Pro League	22	6	3	1	1	0	–		–		26	7
Al Shabab	Total		57	22	5	3	4	5	–		–		66	30
Fujairah	2018–19	UAE Pro League	24	14	2	0	0	0	–		3	1	29	15
Al-Wakrah	2019–20	Qatar Stars League	19	11	0	0	0	0	–		4	1	23	12
Al-Wakrah	2020–21	Qatar Stars League	22	6	1	0	0	0	–		5	5	28	11
Al-Wakrah	2021–22	Qatar Stars League	20	9	2	1	0	0	–		6	7	28	17
Al-Wakrah	2022–23	Qatar Stars League	20	9	1	0	1	1	–		5	2	27	12
Al-Wakrah	2023–24	Qatar Stars League	22	16	2	2	1	0	1 (Note: Appearance in AFC Champions League)	0	2	0	28	18
Al-Wakrah	Total		103	51	6	3	2	1	1	0	22	15	134	70
Al-Sailiya	2024–25	Qatari Second Division	5	2	0	0	0	0	–		–		5	2
Career total			299	115	26	11	6	6	17	2	28	16	376	150

== Honours ==
ES Sétif

- Algerian Ligue Professionnelle 1: 2014–15
- CAF Champions League: 2014
- CAF Super Cup: 2015

Individual

- Qatar Stars League Team of the Year: 2020
