= Amine Megateli =

Algerian footballer (born 1987)

Personal information
- Full name: Amine Megateli
- Date of birth: 4 May 1987 (age 39)
- Place of birth: Médéa, Algeria
- Height: 1.80 m (5 ft 11 in)
- Position: Defender

Team information
- Current team: ES Sétif

Youth career
- JSM Béjaïa

Senior career*
Years	Team	Apps	(Gls)
2007–2014	JSM Béjaïa	113	(6)
2014–	ES Sétif	6	(0)
- * Club domestic league appearances and goals as of 10:00, 23 February 2011 (UTC) ‡ National team caps and goals as of 10:00, 23 February 2011 (UTC)

Amine Megateli (born 4 May 1987) is an Algerian footballer who is currently playing for Algerian Ligue Professionnelle 1 club ES Sétif. Although he plays primarily as a right-back, he has been used as a centre-back, left-back and central midfielder.

== Honours ==
- Algerian Cup (1): 2008
- CAF Champions League (1): 2014
- CAF Super Cup (1): 2015
