= Mourad Delhoum =

Algerian footballer (born 1985)

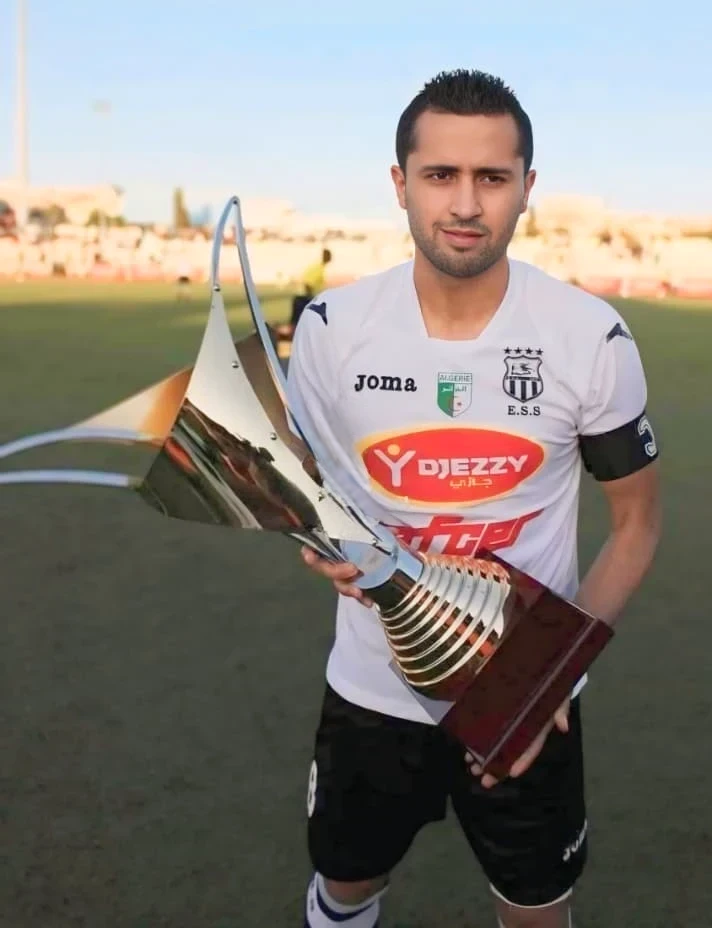
- Delhoum with Oscar-Maracana Trophy for Algeria's Best Player 2013

Personal information
- Full name: Mourad Delhoum
- Date of birth: 10 February 1985 (age 41)
- Place of birth: Sétif, Algeria
- Height: 1.79 m (5 ft 10 in)
- Position: Central midfielder

Team information
- Current team: MC El Eulma
- Number: 8

Senior career*
Years	Team	Apps	(Gls)
2004–2005	A Bou Saâda	-	(-)
2005–2014	ES Sétif	184	(12)
2014	→ Al Nassr (loan)	2	(0)
2014–2015	JS Kabylie	10	(0)
2015–2016	ES Sétif	29	(5)
2016–2017	MC Oran	23	(0)
2017–2018	USM El Harrach	4	(0)
2018–	MC El Eulma	0	(0)

International career
2007	Algeria U23	4	(0)
2010	Algeria A'	3	(0)
- * Club domestic league appearances and goals as of 29 November 2017

Mourad Delhoum (born 10 February 1985 in Sétif) is an Algerian footballer who plays as central midfielder for Algerian Ligue Professionnelle 2 club MC El Eulma.

Delhoum is the cousin of former Algerian international forward Rafik Saïfi.

== International career ==
Delhoum was a member of the Algerian Under-23 National Team at the 2007 All-Africa Games. He also participated in the qualifiers for the 2008 Summer Olympics.

== Honours ==
- Won the Algerian League twice with ES Sétif in 2007 and 2009 and 2012
- Won the Arab Champions League twice with ES Sétif in 2007 and 2008
- Won the North African Cup of Champions once with ES Sétif in 2009
- Won the Algerian Cup once with ES Sétif in 2010 and 2012
- Won the North African Cup Winners Cup once with ES Sétif in 2010
- Finalist in the CAF Confederation Cup once with ES Sétif in 2009
- Won the 2013–14 Saudi Crown Prince Cup once with Al-Nassr in 2014
- Saudi Professional League (1): 2013–14
