= Toufik Zerara =

Algerian football player (born 1986)

Personal information
- Full name: Toufik Zerara
- Date of birth: 3 February 1986 (age 40)
- Place of birth: Mulhouse, France
- Height: 1.77 m (5 ft 10 in)
- Position: Midfielder

Team information
- Current team: CR Belouizdad
- Number: 29

Youth career
- FC Kingersheim
- FC Mulhouse
- 2002–2006: FC Sochaux

Senior career*
Years	Team	Apps	(Gls)
2006–2007	Sochaux	0	(0)
2007	Germinal Beerschot	8	(0)
2008–2009	Al Dhafra	?	(2)
2009–2010	Falkirk	3	(0)
2010	Al Dhafra	-	(2)
2010–2011	SR Colmar	36	(1)
2012–2013	JSM Béjaïa	41	(10)
2013–2016	ES Sétif	71	(3)
2016–2018	CS Constantine	0	(0)
2018–2020	CA Bordj Bou Arréridj	0	(0)
2020–	CR Belouizdad	0	(1)

International career^{‡}
2013–	Algeria A'	1	(0)
- * Club domestic league appearances and goals as of 28 June 2016 ‡ National team caps and goals as of 00:00, 26 May 2013 (UTC)

Toufik Zerara (born 3 February 1986 in Mulhouse) is a footballer currently playing for CR Belouizdad in the Algerian Ligue Professionnelle 1. Born in France, he represented that nation at youth level but then opted to represent Algeria.

== Career ==
=== Youth career ===
He began his football career in the youth side for FC Kingersheim and joined later to the cult club FC Mulhouse.

=== Professional career ===
Zerara began his professional career with the second team of FC Sochaux-Montbéliard who was promoted to the Ligue 1 team in 2006. After one year without a game in the Ligue 1 for Sochaux (Note: Toufik Zerara – French league stats at LFP – also available in French (archived)) signed for Jupiler League club K.F.C. Germinal Beerschot. He played in only season for G.B.A. seven games and joined now to Al Dhafra Club in the UAE League during the 2008–09 season and was released by Emirati club Dhafra a few months ago. On 12 January 2012 Zerara signed for Algerian club JSM Bejaia. On 28 January 2012 he made his debut for the club as a starter in a league game against CS Constantine,

=== Falkirk ===
He then signed for Scottish Premier League club Falkirk in November 2009; although this was outside of the transfer window, Zerara was able to sign as a free agent. On 6 January 2010 Zerara left the club after rejecting a contract extension which did not meet his wage demands.

== International career ==
Zerara is a former France national under-21 football team member, played in 2007 only one game for his country.
