= Farid Mellouli =

Algerian footballer (born 1984)

Personal information
- Full name: Farid Mellouli
- Date of birth: 7 July 1984 (age 42)
- Place of birth: Sétif, Algeria
- Height: 1.80 m (5 ft 11 in)
- Position: Defender

Senior career*
Years	Team	Apps	(Gls)
2004–2005	USM Sétif	-	(-)
2005–2008	OMR El Annasser	-	(-)
2008–2010	MC El Eulma	59	(2)
2010–2013	ASO Chlef	71	(3)
2013–2015	ES Sétif	33	(0)
2015–2016	Al-Qadisiyah	4	(0)
2016	CS Constantine	18	(0)
2017	ES Sétif	3	(0)
2017	US Biskra	9	(0)
2018–2019	MC El Eulma	28	(0)
- * Club domestic league appearances and goals

Farid Mellouli (born 7 July 1984) is an Algerian former professional footballer who played as a defender.

== Club career ==
Mellouli was born in Sétif. On 21 July 2010, Mellouli signed a two-year contract with ASO Chlef.

== Honours ==
ASO Chlef

- Algerian Ligue Professionnelle 1: 2011–12

ES Sétif

- CAF Champions League: 2014
- CAF Super Cup: 2015
- Algerian Ligue Professionnelle 1: 2014–15
