= Sofiane Khedairia =

Algerian football player (born 1989)

Personal information
- Full name: Abdelwaheb Sofiane Khedairia
- Date of birth: 1 April 1989 (age 37)
- Place of birth: Valence, France
- Height: 1.85 m (6 ft 1 in)
- Position: Goalkeeper

Youth career
- 2004–2008: Toulouse

Senior career*
Years	Team	Apps	(Gls)
2008–2009	Besançon	2	(0)
2009–2010	Cassis Carnoux	13	(0)
2010–2012	Le Mans	1	(0)
2012–2017	ES Sétif	116	(0)
2018	JSM Béjaïa	11	(?)
2018–2019	USM Bel Abbès	13	(?)
2019–2022	ES Sétif	58	(0)
2022–2023	Al-Shoulla	23	(0)
2023–2025	USM Khenchela	33	(0)
2025–2026	NA Hussein Dey	0	(0)

International career
2006	Algeria U17	2	(0)
2008	Algeria U20	2	(0)
2010	Algeria U23	1	(0)
2013	Algeria A'	3	(0)
- * Club domestic league appearances and goals as of 02 October 2026

Abdelwaheb Sofiane Khedairia (Arabic: عبد الوهاب سفيان خذايرية; born 1 April 1989) is a footballer. Born in France, he represented Algeria at international level.

== Career ==
Khedairia began his career playing for two small amateur clubs, US Baille and Burel FC. In 2004, he joined the Toulouse FC academy and progressed his way up the ranks. On January 24, 2007, despite being just 17 years old, Khedairia was called up to the senior side for the first time and was on the bench for Toulouse in a Ligue 1 match against Nice. However, he did not play in the game.

In June 2018, he joined USM Bel Abbès, but Khedairia returned to ES Sétif in July 2019 where he remained until July 2022, when he joined Saudi club Al-Shoulla. In August 2023, Khedairia signed a two-year contract for USM Khenchela.In July 2025, he joined NA Hussein Dey.

=== International ===
Khedairia was called up to the senior Algeria squad for the 2017 Africa Cup of Nations qualifier against Lesotho in September 2015.
