= 2014–15 Algerian Ligue Professionnelle 1 =

Algerian Ligue Professionnelle 1
- Season: 2014–15
- Dates: 15 August 2014 – 29 May 2015
- Champions: ES Sétif
- Champions League: ES Sétif; MO Béjaïa
- Confederation Cup: MC Oran; RC Arbaâ
- Matches: 240
- Goals: 475 (1.98 per match)
- Top goalscorer: Walid Derrardja (16)
- Biggest home win: MC Alger 4-0 MC El Eulma (20 January 2015); USM Alger 5-1 RC Arbaâ (6 February 2015)
- Biggest away win: ASO Chlef 0-3 CS Constantine (22 November 2014)
- Highest scoring: ES Sétif 5-2 ASM Oran (6 March 2015)
- Longest winning run: USM Alger (5)
- Longest unbeaten run: MO Béjaïa (9)
- Longest winless run: ASO Chlef; MC Alger (11)
- Longest losing run: MC Alger (6)
- Highest attendance: 39,760 MC Oran 0-0 USM Alger (22 March 2015)
- Lowest attendance: 3,500 ASO Chlef 0-3 CS Constantine

The 2014–15 Algerian Ligue Professionnelle 1 was the 53rd season of the Algerian Ligue Professionnelle 1 since its establishment in 1962. A total of 16 teams contested the league, with USM Alger as the defending champions. Following the death of Albert Ebossé Bodjongo, the Algerian Football Federation suspended all football indefinitely. The league resumed on Week 3 starting 12 September 2014, with all matches on that week were preceded with a minute silence in memory of Ebossé.

== Team summaries ==
Locations of teams in the 2014–15 Algerian Ligue Professionnelle 1

=== Promotion and relegation ===
Teams promoted from 2013–14 Algerian Ligue Professionnelle 2

- ASM Oran
- NA Hussein Dey
- USM Bel-Abbès

Teams relegated to 2014-15 Algerian Ligue Professionnelle 2

- CA Bordj Bou Arréridj
- CRB Aïn Fakroun
- JSM Béjaïa

=== Stadiums and locations ===
Team	Location	Stadium	Stadium capacity
ASM Oran	Oran	Habib Bouakeul Stadium	20,000
ASO Chlef	Chlef	Mohamed Boumezrag Stadium	18,000
CR Belouizdad	Algiers	20 August 1955 Stadium	15,000
CS Constantine	Constantine	Chahid Hamlaoui Stadium	35,000
ES Sétif	Sétif	8 May 1945 Stadium	25,000
JS Kabylie	Tizi Ouzou	1 November 1954 Stadium	25,000
JS Saoura	Béchar	20 August 1955 Stadium	20,000
MC Alger	Algiers	Omar Hamadi Stadium	17,000
MC El Eulma	El Eulma	Messaoud Zeghar Stadium	25,000
MC Oran	Oran	Ahmed Zabana Stadium	40,000
MO Béjaïa	Béjaïa	Maghrebi Unity Stadium	25,000
NA Hussein Dey	Hussein Dey District	20 August 1955 Stadium	15,000
RC Arbaâ	Larbaâ	Ismaïl Makhlouf Stadium	8,000
USM Alger	Algiers	Omar Hamadi Stadium	17,000
USM Bel-Abbès	Sidi Bel Abbès	24 February 1956 Stadium	50,000
USM El Harrach	Algiers	1 November 1954 Stadium	8,000

=== Personnel and kits ===
Team	Chairman	Head coach	Captain	Manufacturer	Sponsors
ASM Oran	(Algeria) Mohamed El Morro	(Algeria) Djamel Benchadli	(Algeria) Seddik Bouhadda	Sarson	ATM Mobilis
ASO Chlef	(Algeria) Abdelkrim Medouar	(Algeria) Mohamed Benchouia	(Algeria) Samir Zaoui	adidas	Ooredoo
CR Belouizdad	(Algeria) Réda Malek	(France) Alain Michel	(Algeria) Aboubaker Rebih	Joma	Ooredoo, CNEP-Banque
CS Constantine	(Algeria) Omar Bentobal	(France) Francois Bracci	(Algeria) Hamza Boulemdais	Macron	Tassili Airlines, ATM Mobilis
ES Sétif	(Algeria) Hassan Hammar	(Algeria) Kheirredine Madoui	(Algeria) Farid Mellouli	Joma	Djezzy GSM
JS Kabylie	(Algeria) Mohand Chérif Hannachi	(France) Jean-Guy Wallemme	(Algeria) Ali Rial	Adidas	Ooredoo, Peugeot
RC Arbaâ	(Algeria) Djamel Amani	(Algeria) Mohamed Mihoubi	(Algeria) Hamza Zeddam	Joma	ATM Mobilis
JS Saoura	(Algeria) Mohamed Zerouati	(Algeria) Mohamed Henkouche	(Algeria) Djilali Terbah	KCS	Enafor
MC Alger	(Algeria) Hadj Taleb	(Portugal) Artur Jorge	(Algeria) Abderahmane Hachoud	Joma	Djezzy GSM, Sonatrach
MC El Eulma	(Algeria) Arras Herrada	(Algeria) Azzedine Aït Djoudi	(Algeria) Nacer Hammami	KCS	Ooredoo
MC Oran	(Algeria) Ahmed Belhadj	(France) Jean-Michel Cavalli	(Algeria) Seddik Berradja	Sarson	Naftal, Ooredoo, Aigle Azur
NA Hussein Dey	(Algeria) Mahfoud Ould Zmirli	(Algeria) Meziane Ighil	(Algeria) Chérif Abdeslam	Joma	ATM Mobilis
USM Alger	(Algeria) Ali Haddad	(Germany) Otto Pfister	(Algeria) Nacereddine Khoualed	adidas	Djezzy GSM, ETRHB Haddad, Sonelgaz
USM Bel-Abbès	(Algeria) Belkacem Aïda	(Algeria) Ali Mechiche	(Algeria) Hocine Achiou	Joma	ATM Mobilis
USM El Harrach	(Algeria) Mohamed Laïb	(Algeria) Boualem Charef	(Algeria) Salim Boumechra	Patrick	ATM Mobilis
MO Béjaïa	(Algeria) Nacer Maouche	(Algeria) Abdelkader Amrani	(Algeria) Nassim Dehouche	Macron	ATM Mobilis

== Results ==
=== League table ===
Pos	Team	Pld	W	D	L	GF	GA	GD	Pts	Qualification or relegation
1	ES Sétif (C)	30	13	9	8	37	28	+9	48	2016 CAF Champions League
2	MO Béjaïa	30	12	11	7	36	23	+13	47	2016 CAF Champions League
3	MC Oran	30	11	11	8	19	19	0	44	2016 CAF Confederation Cup
4	USM El Harrach	30	13	4	13	30	32	−2	43	
5	CS Constantine	30	11	9	10	32	31	+1	42 (Note: CSC 3-1 CRB; CRB 1-1 CSC)	2016 CAF Confederation Cup
6	CR Belouizdad	30	11	9	10	27	34	−7	42	
7	ASM Oran	30	11	8	11	33	37	−4	41 (Note: USMA 1-2 ASMO; ASMO 1-0 USMA)	
8	USM Alger	30	10	11	9	35	27	+8	41	
9	NA Hussein Dey	30	10	10	10	23	22	+1	40 (Note: NAHD 3-0 RCA; RCA 0-1 NAHD)	
10	RC Arbaâ	30	12	4	14	28	35	−7	40	
11	JS Saoura	30	10	9	11	26	29	−3	39 (Note: JSS: 9 points; MCA: 6 points; JSK: 3 points)	
12	MC Alger	30	10	9	11	33	31	+2	39	
13	JS Kabylie	30	11	6	13	35	35	0	39	
14	MC El Eulma (R)	30	11	5	14	40	36	+4	38	2014–15 Algerian Ligue Professionnelle 2
15	ASO Chlef (R)	30	8	12	10	24	28	−4	36	2014–15 Algerian Ligue Professionnelle 2
16	USM Bel Abbès (R)	30	8	9	13	19	28	−9	33	2014–15 Algerian Ligue Professionnelle 2

Updated to match(es) played on 29 May 2015. Source: DZFoot
Rules for classification: 1) points; 2) head-to-head points; 3) head-to-head goal difference; 4) goal difference; 5) total goals; 6) fairplay ranking; 7) playoff
(C) Champions; (R) Relegated
Notes:

RC Arbaâ was to participate in the 2016 CAF Confederation Cup as a runners-up of the 2014–15 Algerian Cup in place of MO Béjaïa, because MO Béjaïa take part to 2016 CAF Champions League as a runners-up to a championship. However RC Arbaâ withdrew from the competition because that does not have a Fifa license, it was replaced by CS Constantine.

=== Result table ===
Home \ Away	ASMO	ASC	CRB	CSC	ESS	JSK	JSSR	MCA	MCEE	MCO	MOB	NAH	RCA	UAL	USMB	UEH
ASM Oran		2–0	0–0	0–1	1–0	2–3	1–0	2–1	1–0	0–0	1–1	2–1	3–2	1–0	2–1	1–3
ASO Chlef	1–1		2–0	0–3	2–1	1–1	0–0	0–0	2–1	3–0	0–0	0–0	2–0	0–0	1–1	2–1
CR Belouizdad	2–1	3–2		1–1	0–0	2–1	1–1	2–0	1–0	1–0	0–2	0–0	1–1	2–1	1–1	1–0
CS Constantine	1–0	1–0	3–1		1–2	3–1	0–0	1–1	2–2	0–0	1–0	2–2	2–0	2–1	0–0	4–1
ES Sétif	5–2	0–1	1–0	2–0		1–0	3–0	2–1	1–1	1–2	1–1	1–1	2–1	3–2	0–0	2–0
JS Kabylie	0–2	0–0	0–1	2–1	1–1		0–1	1–2	1–0	0–1	2–1	1–0	2–1	1–2	0–1	1–0
JS Saoura	3–1	0–0	1–2	1–1	1–2	2–1		2–1	1–0	0–0	0–1	1–0	2–1	3–2	1–0	1–0
MC Alger	0–0	3–1	3–0	0–0	1–0	4–2	2–1		4–0	1–0	1–0	1–0	0–2	0–1	1–0	1–1
MC El Eulma	3–0	2–1	4–1	3–0	0–1	3–2	0–0	2–1		0–1	1–2	2–0	2–0	1–2	1–0	4–1
MC Oran	0–0	1–0	0–0	2–1	2–1	0–2	1–0	1–1	2–1		1–1	1–0	2–0	0–0	0–0	1–0
MO Béjaïa	1–0	0–0	2–2	2–0	3–0	3–1	1–1	2–2	3–2	0–0		0–0	2–0	0–1	1–0	0–1
NA Hussein Dey	2–1	1–0	1–0	2–0	0–0	1–2	1–0	1–1	1–2	1–0	0–2		3–0	0–0	1–0	1–2
RC Arbaâ	1–0	3–1	2–0	0–1	1–1	0–0	2–1	2–1	0–0	1–0	1–0	0–1		2–0	2–0	1–0
USM Alger	1–2	3–1	2–0	2–0	1–1	1–1	3–1	0–0	1–1	1–1	1–1	0–0	5–1		2–0	0–1
USM Bel Abbès	1–1	0–0	0–1	2–0	1–2	0–2	1–1	2–1	1–2	1–0	1–3	0–0	1–0	1–0		2–1
USM El Harrach	3–3	0–1	2–1	1–0	1–0	0–0	1–0	1–0	2–1	2–0	2–1	1–2	0–1	0–0	2–0	

Updated to match(es) played on 29 May 2015. Source: DZFoot
Legend: Blue = home team win; Yellow = draw; Red = away team win.

== Positions by round ==
Team ╲ Round	1	2	3	4	5	6	7	8	9	10	11	12	13	14	15	16	17	18	19	20	21	22	23	24	25	26	27	28	29	30
ES Sétif	8	12	6	6	3	4	7	8	11	13	7	5	5	4	4	2	2	2	2	2	2	2	2	2	1	1	1	1	1	1
MO Béjaïa	2	2	5	5	7	8	3	1	1	2	1	1	4	2	1	1	1	1	1	1	1	1	1	1	2	4	2	2	2	2
MC Oran	16	16	10	15	12	6	9	4	6	3	5	6	6	6	9	3	3	5	3	3	5	5	4	4	5	3	3	4	5	3
USM El Harrach	13	8	12	8	4	2	2	5	2	1	4	4	2	1	3	5	6	3	5	7	7	6	9	8	6	2	4	5	6	4
CS Constantine	1	1	1	1	1	1	1	2	3	4	2	2	3	5	5	7	4	6	8	9	10	9	10	10	11	9	6	6	10	5
CR Belouizdad	14	10	13	12	15	13	15	15	14	11	11	9	10	13	11	11	10	9	6	4	6	8	6	7	8	5	5	3	3	6
ASM Oran	7	3	8	10	9	10	8	3	5	8	10	11	12	9	7	6	7	4	7	6	4	4	5	6	3	6	8	7	4	7
USM Alger	9	4	2	4	8	11	12	14	8	5	3	3	1	3	2	4	5	7	4	5	3	3	3	3	4	7	7	8	11	8
NA Hussein Dey	15	15	16	16	16	16	16	16	16	16	14	13	15	14	14	13	13	14	14	15	14	13	15	16	16	16	15	12	12	9
RC Arbaâ	5	9	11	7	11	12	14	12	13	10	13	12	14	12	10	8	8	8	9	8	8	7	7	5	7	10	12	13	13	10
JS Saoura	11	13	4	9	13	9	5	7	10	12	12	14	11	11	8	10	11	13	11	12	11	12	11	11	12	13	11	9	7	11
MC Alger	12	5	7	3	5	5	10	13	15	15	16	16	16	16	16	16	16	15	16	14	16	15	13	12	9	11	9	11	8	12
JS Kabylie	3	6	3	2	2	3	6	9	4	7	9	10	9	8	6	9	9	10	12	10	12	10	8	9	10	8	10	10	9	13
MC El Eulma	4	7	9	11	6	7	4	6	9	6	8	7	8	10	13	14	12	12	10	11	9	11	14	14	14	12	13	14	15	14
ASO Chlef	10	14	15	14	14	15	13	10	12	14	15	15	13	15	15	15	15	16	15	16	15	16	16	15	15	15	14	15	14	15
USM Bel Abbès	6	11	14	13	10	14	11	11	7	9	6	8	7	7	12	12	14	11	13	13	13	14	12	13	13	14	16	16	16	16

Leader
2016 CAF Champions League
2016 CAF Confederation Cup
Relegation to Ligue Professionnelle 2 2015-16

Updated to match(es) played on 29 May 2015. Source: DZfoot.com (in French)

== Clubs season-progress ==
Team ╲ Round	1	2	3	4	5	6	7	8	9	10	11	12	13	14	15	16	17	18	19	20	21	22	23	24	25	26	27	28	29	30
ASM Oran	D	W	L	D	D	D	W	W	L	L	D	L	D	W	W	W	L	W	L	W	W	L	L	D	W	L	L	D	W	L
ASO Chlef	D	L	D	D	D	L	W	W	W	L	L	L	D	L	D	D	D	D	D	L	W	L	W	W	W	L	W	D	D	L
Belouizdad	L	W	L	D	L	W	L	L	W	W	D	W	L	L	W	D	D	W	W	W	L	D	D	D	L	W	W	D	D	L
Constantine	W	W	W	D	L	W	L	D	L	D	W	W	D	L	L	D	W	L	L	D	L	W	L	D	D	W	W	D	L	W
ES Sétif	D	D	W	D	W	D	L	W	L	D	W	D	W	W	L	W	W	D	D	W	L	W	L	L	W	L	W	D	W	L
JS Kabylie	W	L	W	D	W	L	L	L	W	D	L	L	W	D	W	L	D	L	D	W	L	W	W	L	L	W	L	D	W	L
JS Saoura	D	D	W	L	L	W	W	L	L	D	D	L	W	D	W	D	L	L	W	L	W	L	W	D	D	L	W	D	W	L
MC Alger	L	W	D	W	D	D	L	L	L	L	L	L	D	D	L	W	D	W	L	W	L	W	W	W	W	D	D	D	W	L
El Eulma	W	L	L	D	W	D	W	L	L	W	L	W	L	L	L	L	W	D	W	L	W	L	L	D	W	W	L	D	L	W
MC Oran	L	L	W	L	W	W	D	W	L	W	D	D	D	D	W	W	D	L	W	D	L	D	W	D	L	W	D	D	L	W
MO Béjaïa	W	D	D	D	D	D	W	W	W	L	W	D	L	W	W	D	W	D	W	L	W	L	D	L	L	L	D	D	W	W
Hussein Dey	L	L	D	D	L	L	W	D	W	L	W	D	L	W	L	D	W	L	D	L	W	D	D	D	L	W	W	W	D	W
RC Arbaâ	W	L	L	W	L	D	L	W	L	W	L	D	L	W	W	W	L	W	L	W	L	W	L	W	L	L	L	D	D	W
USM Alger	D	W	W	L	L	L	D	D	W	W	W	W	W	L	D	L	D	L	W	D	W	D	D	D	L	D	L	D	L	W
Bel-Abbès	D	D	L	D	W	L	W	D	W	L	W	D	D	D	L	L	L	W	L	L	W	L	W	D	W	L	L	D	L	L
El Harrach	L	W	L	W	W	W	L	L	W	W	L	W	W	D	L	L	L	W	L	D	L	W	L	D	W	W	D	L	L	W

Updated to match(es) played on 29 May 2015. Source: Clubs Season-Progress
W = Win; D = Draw; L = Lose

== Season statistics ==
=== Top scorers ===
Rank	Scorer	Club	Goals
1	(Algeria) Walid Derrardja	MC El Eulma	16
2	(Algeria) Hamza Boulemdaïs	CS Constantine	14
3	(Algeria) Oussama Darfalou	RC Arbaâ	12
4	(Algeria) Antar Djemaouni	ASM Oran	10
4	(Algeria) Kaled Gourmi	MC Alger	10
4	(Algeria) Ali Rial	JS Kabylie	10
7	(Algeria) Lamine Abid	USM El Harrach	9
8	(Algeria) Zahir Zerdab	MO Béjaïa	8
9	(Algeria) Ibrahim Chenihi	MC El Eulma	7
9	(Algeria) Okacha Hamzaoui	MO Béjaïa	7
9	(Algeria) Farès Hamiti	MC El Eulma	7
9	(Algeria) Nouri Ouznadji	NA Hussein Dey	7

=== Hat-tricks ===
Player	Club	Against	Result	Date
(Algeria) Hamza Boulemdaïs	Constantine	El Harrach	4—1	13 September 2014
(Algeria) Walid Derrardja	El Eulma	Kabylie	3—2	18 October 2014
(Algeria) Abdelmalek Ziaya	Sétif	Saoura	3—0	14 February 2015
(Algeria) Sofiane Younès	Sétif	Oran	5—2	6 March 2015

== Media coverage ==
Algerian Ligue Professionnelle 1 Media Coverage
Country	Television Channel	Matches
Algeria	EPTV	3 Matches per round
Qatar	beIN Sports Arabia	1 Match per round
Qatar	Al-Kass Sports Channel	1 Match per round

== See also ==
- 2014–15 Algerian Ligue Professionnelle 2
- 2014–15 Algerian Cup
