= ES Sétif in African football =

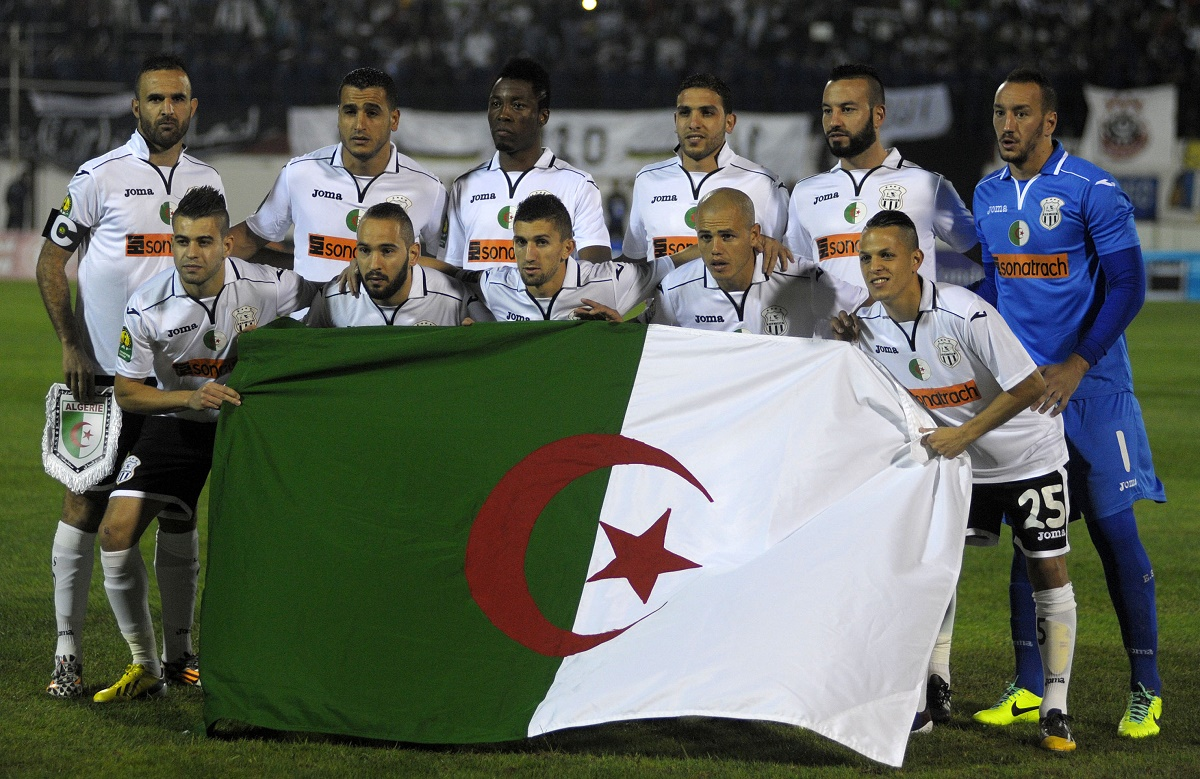
- 2014 CAF Champions League winning team with From Left to Right: Stand Up : Mellouli (C) - Ziaya - Zé Ondo - Megateli - Demmou - Khedairia. Sitting Djahnit - Zerara - Younès - Lagraâ - Belameiri.
- Club: ES Sétif
- Most appearances: Akram Djahnit 60
- Top scorer: Abdelmalek Ziaya 22
- First entry: 1981 African Cup Winners' Cup
- Latest entry: 2021–22 CAF Champions League

Titles
- Champions League: 2: 1988; 2014
- Super Cup: 1: 2015
- Afro-Asian Cup: 1: 1989

ES Sétif, an Algerian professional association football club, has gained entry to Confederation of African Football (CAF) competitions on several occasions. They have represented Algeria in the Champions League on eleven occasions, the Confederation Cup on four occasions, the now-defunct Cup Winners' Cup two occasions.

== History ==
=== Early years ===
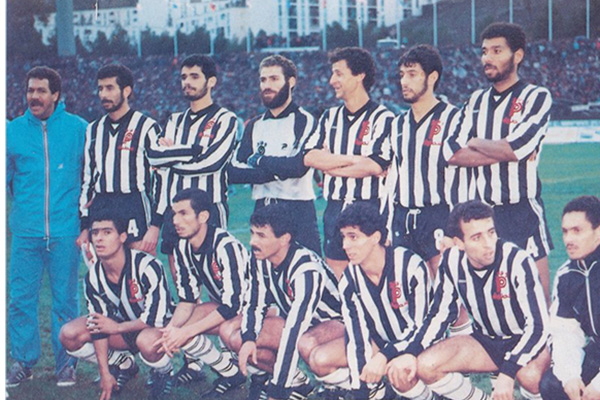
ES Sétif 1989–90 with From Left to Right: Stand Up : Serrar - Boulehdjilet - Osmani - Nabti - Zorgane - Bernaoui. Sitting Bendjabellah - Rahmani - Adjissa - Gharib - Adjas. This team participated in the 1988 African Cup of Champions Clubs.

ES Sétif whose team has regularly taken part in Confederation of African Football (CAF) competitions. Qualification for Algerian clubs is determined by a team's performance in its domestic league and cup competitions, ES Sétif have regularly qualified for the primary African competition, the African Cup, by winning the Ligue Professionnelle 1. ES Sétif have also achieved African qualification via the Algerian Cup and have played in the former African Cup Winners' Cup. the first match was against Kampala City FC and it ended in a 1–0 loss, As for the biggest win was in 1991 against ASC Linguère 7–1, and biggest loss was against Union Douala 5–0 in 1981. After six years of absence, ES Setif returned to continental competitions, this time in the African Cup of Champions Clubs, for the first time The following year and in the same competition, despite falling to the second division, Les Aigles Noirs managed to achieve the title for the first time against Iwuanyanwu Nationale of Nigeria and after the defeat in the First leg 1–0, they achieved an overwhelming victory in the Second leg 4–0 in a match that took place at Stade du 17 Juin in Constantine, After that, they met with Al Sadd SC in the final of the Afro-Asian Club Championship, and won the title for the first time, which is the only one of its kind in the history of Algerian football. In 1991 ES Sétif participated in the last continental participation in the twentieth century, where it reached the semi-finals, and in the Second round, Malik Zorgane scored the first hat-trick for ES Sétif against SC Gagnoa.

=== After 26 years won the CAF Champions League again ===
After regression in the level for a decade, ES Setif began to return to the higher level, where did achieve league title, 2006–07 season, the first in twenty years. To return to the continental competition again after 17 years but ES Sétif's career stopped in the first round against Olympique Khouribga by a penalty shootout, A year later, in the Confederation Cup, ES Sétif managed to reach the final for the first time, but was defeated against Stade Malien. in the same competition Abdelmalek Ziaya won the title of top goalscorer with 15 goal. After that ES Sétif participated several times between the CAF Confederation Cup and the CAF Champions League until 2014 CAF Champions League, where they achieved the first title in 26 years and the first for an Algerian club in the new version, The start of the journey was against ASFA Yennenga then against Coton Sport where did qualify to the group stage, Where draw put them in Group B with CS Sfaxien and Espérance de Tunis from Tunisia and Al-Ahly Benghazi from Libya. Then in the semi-finals they met TP Mazembe and won by Away goals rule, and in the final again with a club from RD Congo AS Vita Club and they won in the same way against TP Mazembe. To ensure the qualification card to FIFA Club World Cup and becomes the first Algerian club to participate in it, The first game was against New Zealand's Auckland City and they loss 1–0. Later another final, ES Sétif was waiting for this time in the CAF Super Cup the Egyptian giant Al-Ahly and they won by penalty shootout 6–5, which is the first title in the history of Algeria since the creation of the CAF Super Cup in 1993.

== CAF competitions ==
ES Sétif results in CAF competition
| Season | Competition | Round | Club | Home | Away | Aggregate | Ref. |
|---|---|---|---|---|---|---|---|
| 1981 | Cup Winners' Cup | First round | (Uganda) Kampala City Council FC | 2–0 | 0–1 | 2–1 | |
| 1981 | Cup Winners' Cup | Second round | Bye | | | | |
| 1981 | Cup Winners' Cup | Quarterfinals | (Cameroon) US Douala | 1–1 | 0–5 | 1–6 | |
| 1987 | Cup of Champions Clubs | First round | (Senegal) ASC Jeanne d'Arc | 2–0 | 1–2 | 3–2 | |
| 1987 | Cup of Champions Clubs | Second round | (Cameroon) Canon Yaoundé | 0–0 | 1–2 | 1–2 | |
| 1988 | Cup of Champions Clubs | First round | (Mali) Stade Malien | 4–0 | 1–1 | 5–1 | |
| 1988 | Cup of Champions Clubs | Second round | (Tunisia) ES Sahel | 2–0 | 1–2 | 3–2 | |
| 1988 | Cup of Champions Clubs | Quarter-Finals (Note: ES Sétif changed the name to EP Sétif from 1977 to 1987 and to Entente de Sétif from 1987-88 to 1988-89 seasons, so the club participated under the first name until the quarter-final and under the second name in the semi-final and the final.) | (Gabon) FC 105 Libreville | 3–0 | 1–3 | 4–3 | |
| 1988 | Cup of Champions Clubs | Semi-Finals | (Egypt) Al-Ahly | 2–0 | 0–2 | 2–2 (4–2 p) | |
| 1988 | Cup of Champions Clubs | Final | (Nigeria) Iwuanyanwu Nationale | 4–0 | 0–1 | 4–1 | |
| 1989 | Cup of Champions Clubs | First round | (Sierra Leone) Mighty Blackpool FC | 1–0 | 0–1 | 1–1 (3–5 p) | |
| 1991 | Cup Winners' Cup | First round | (Senegal) ASC Linguère | 7–1 | 0–1 | 7–2 | |
| 1991 | Cup Winners' Cup | Second round | (Ivory Coast) SC Gagnoa | 4–0 | 1–2 | 5–2 | |
| 1991 | Cup Winners' Cup | Quarter-finals | (Zaire) DC Motema Pembe | 2–0 | 1–2 | 3–2 | |
| 1991 | Cup Winners' Cup | Semi-finals | (Nigeria) BCC Lions FC | 1–1 | 0–1 | 1–2 | |
| 2008 | Champions League | Preliminary Round | (Mauritania) ASC SNIM | 2–0 | 5–1 | 7–1 | |
| 2008 | Champions League | First round | (Morocco) Olympique Khouribga | 2–0 | 0–2 | 2–2 (0–3 p) | |
| 2009 | Confederation Cup | First round | (Libya) Khaleej Sirte | 5–0 | 1–0 | 6–0 | |
| 2009 | Confederation Cup | Second round | (Angola) CRD Libolo | 4–0 | 1–5 | 5–5 (a) | |
| 2009 | Confederation Cup | Play-off round | (Mali) Djoliba AC | 3–1 | 1–3 | 4–4 (4–3 p) | |
| 2009 | Confederation Cup | Group stage (A) | (Democratic Republic of the Congo) AS Vita Club | 2–0 | 1–2 | 1st place | |
| 2009 | Confederation Cup | Group stage (A) | (Egypt) ENPPI Club | 1–3 | 4–3 | 1st place | |
| 2009 | Confederation Cup | Group stage (A) | (Angola) Santos FC | 6–0 | 0–1 | 1st place | |
| 2009 | Confederation Cup | Semi-finals | (Nigeria) Bayelsa United | 1–0 | 1–1 | 2–1 | |
| 2009 | Confederation Cup | Final | (Mali) Stade Malien | 2–0 | 0–2 | 2–2 (2–3 p) | |
| 2010 | Champions League | Preliminary Round | (Republic of the Congo) Diables Noirs | 2–0 | 2–3 | 4–3 | |
| 2010 | Champions League | First round | (Cameroon) US Douala | 5–0 | 2–0 | 7–0 | |
| 2010 | Champions League | First round | (Zambia) Zanaco FC | 1–0 | 2–2 | 3–2 | |
| 2010 | Champions League | Group stage (A) | (Tunisia) Espérance ST | 0–1 | 2–2 | 3rd place | |
| 2010 | Champions League | Group stage (A) | (Democratic Republic of the Congo) TP Mazembe | 0–0 | 2–2 | 3rd place | |
| 2010 | Champions League | Group stage (A) | (Zimbabwe) Dynamos FC | 3–0 | 0–1 | 3rd place | |
| 2011 | Champions League | First round | (Burkina Faso) ASFA Yennenga | 2–0 | 4–3 | 6–3 | |
| 2011 | Champions League | Second Round | (Cameroon) Coton Sport FC | 2–0 | 1–4 | 3–4 | |
| 2011 | Confederation Cup | Play-off round | (Nigeria) Kaduna United | 1–0 | 0–3 | 1–3 | |
| 2012 | Confederation Cup | First round | (Tanzania) Simba | 3–1 | 0–2 | 3–3 (a) | |
| 2013 | Champions League | First round | (Burkina Faso) ASFA Yennenga | 4–2 | 1–2 | 5–4 | |
| 2013 | Champions League | Second round | (Republic of the Congo) AC Léopards | 3–1 | 1–3 | 4–4 (4–5 p) | |
| 2013 | Confederation Cup | Play-off round | (Gabon) US Bitam | 2–0 | 0–2 | 2–2 (5–3 p) | |
| 2013 | Confederation Cup | Group stage (B) | (Democratic Republic of the Congo) TP Mazembe | 1–1 | 2–4 | 4th place | |
| 2013 | Confederation Cup | Group stage (B) | (Tunisia) CA Bizertin | 1–0 | 0–0 | 4th place | |
| 2013 | Confederation Cup | Group stage (B) | (Morocco) FUS Rabat | 1–1 | 0–1 | 4th place | |
| 2014 | Champions League | Preliminary round | (The Gambia) Steve Biko FC | w/o | | | |
| 2014 | Champions League | First round | (Burkina Faso) ASFA Yennenga | 5–0 | 0–0 | 5–0 | |
| 2014 | Champions League | Second round | (Cameroon) Coton Sport | 1–0 | 1–0 | 2–0 | |
| 2014 | Champions League | Group stage (B) | (Tunisia) CS Sfaxien | 1–1 | 1–1 | 2nd place | |
| 2014 | Champions League | Group stage (B) | (Tunisia) Espérance de Tunis | 2–2 | 2–1 | 2nd place | |
| 2014 | Champions League | Group stage (B) | (Libya) Al-Ahly Benghazi | 1–1 | 2–0 | 2nd place | |
| 2014 | Champions League | Semi-finals | (Democratic Republic of the Congo) TP Mazembe | 2–1 | 2–3 | 4–4 (a) | |
| 2014 | Champions League | Final | (Democratic Republic of the Congo) AS Vita Club | 2–2 | 1–1 | 3–3 (a) | |
| 2015 | Champions League | First round | (The Gambia) Real Banjul | 2–0 | 1–1 | 3–1 | |
| 2015 | Champions League | Second round | (Morocco) Raja Casablanca | 2–2 | 2–2 | 4–4 (4–1 p) | |
| 2015 | Champions League | Group stage (B) | (Algeria) USM Alger | 1–2 | 0–3 | 3rd place | |
| 2015 | Champions League | Group stage (B) | (Algeria) MC El Eulma | 2–2 | 1–0 | 3rd place | |
| 2015 | Champions League | Group stage (B) | (Sudan) Al-Merrikh SC | 1–1 | 0–2 | 3rd place | |
| 2016 | Champions League | First round | (Republic of the Congo) Étoile du Congo | 4–2 | 1–1 | 5–3 | |
| 2016 | Champions League | Second round | (Sudan) Al-Merrikh SC | 0–0 | 2–2 | 2–2 (a) | |
| 2016 | Champions League | Group stage (B) | (South Africa) Mamelodi Sundowns | 0–2 | – | Disqualified (Note: The CAF announced on 23 June 2016 that ES Sétif were disqualified for a pitch invasion and other incidents at their home match against Mamelodi Sundowns on 18 June 2016. The result of this match was annulled and not taken into consideration according to the regulations.) | |
| 2016 | Champions League | Group stage (B) | (Egypt) Zamalek | – | – | Disqualified | |
| 2016 | Champions League | Group stage (B) | (Nigeria) Enyimba | – | – | Disqualified | |
| 2018 | Champions League | Preliminary round | (Central African Republic) Olympic Real de Bangui | 6–0 | 0–0 | 6–0 | |
| 2018 | Champions League | First round | (Ghana) Aduana Stars | 4–0 | 0–1 | 4–1 | |
| 2018 | Champions League | Group stage (B) | (Democratic Republic of the Congo) TP Mazembe | 1–1 | 1–4 | 2nd place | |
| 2018 | Champions League | Group stage (B) | (Algeria) MC Alger | 0–1 | 2–1 | 2nd place | |
| 2018 | Champions League | Group stage (B) | (Morocco) Difaâ El Jadidi | 2–1 | 1–1 | 2nd place | |
| 2018 | Champions League | Quarter-finals | (Morocco) Wydad Casablanca | 1–0 | 0–0 | 1–0 | |
| 2018 | Champions League | Semi-finals | (Egypt) Al-Ahly | 2–1 | 0–2 | 2–3 | |
| 2020–21 | Confederation Cup | First round | (Chad) Renaissance | Cancelled (Note: Renaissance failed to appear for the first leg in N'Djamena following disputes between the Ministry of Youth and Sports in the country and the Chadian Football Federation, which prevented the club from playing the match in their home country. A decision will be made by CAF regarding this incident.) | Cancelled | | |
| 2020–21 | Confederation Cup | Play-off round | (Ghana) Asante Kotoko | 0–0 | 2–1 | 2–1 | |
| 2020–21 | Confederation Cup | Group stage (A) | (South Africa) Orlando Pirates | 0–0 | 0–0 | 3rd place | |
| 2020–21 | Confederation Cup | Group stage (A) | (Libya) Al-Ahly Benghazi | 1–0 | 0–1 | 3rd place | |
| 2020–21 | Confederation Cup | Group stage (A) | (Nigeria) Enyimba | 3–0 | 1–2 | 3rd place | |
| 2021–22 | Champions League | First round | (The Gambia) Fortune | 3–0 | 0–3 | 3–3 (5–4 p) | |
| 2021–22 | Champions League | Second round | (Mauritania) FC Nouadhibou | 2–0 | 1–3 | 3–3 | |
| 2021–22 | Champions League | Group stage (B) | (Guinea) Horoya | 3–2 | 1–0 | 2nd place | |
| 2021–22 | Champions League | Group stage (B) | (Morocco) Raja Casablanca | 0–1 | 0–1 | 2nd place | |
| 2021–22 | Champions League | Group stage (B) | (South Africa) AmaZulu | 2–0 | 0–1 | 2nd place | |
| 2021–22 | Champions League | Quarter-finals | (Tunisia) Espérance de Tunis | 0–0 | 1–0 | 1–0 | |
| 2021–22 | Champions League | Semi-finals | (Egypt) Al Ahly | 2–2 | 0–4 | 2–6 | |

== North African ==
| Season | Competition | Round | Opposition | Home | Away | Aggregate |
|---|---|---|---|---|---|---|
| 2009 | North African Cup of Champions | Semi-finals | (Morocco) Raja Casablanca | 2–0 | 1–1 | 3–1 |
| 2009 | North African Cup of Champions | Final | (Tunisia) Espérance | 1–1 | 1–1 | 2–2 (6 – 5 pen.) |
| 2010 | North African Super Cup | Final | (Tunisia) CS Sfaxien | 1–0 | 1–0 | |
| 2010 | North African Cup Winners Cup | Semi-finals | (Tunisia) Olympique de Beja | 3–0 | 0–1 | 3–1 |
| 2010 | North African Cup Winners Cup | Final | (Libya) Al Nasr SC | 3–2 | 3–1 | 6–3 |

== UAFA (Non-CAF) competitions ==
Arab Champions league

| Season | Round | Club | Home | Away | Aggregate | Ref. |
|---|---|---|---|---|---|---|
| 2004–05 | Round of 32 | (Mauritania) ASAC Concorde | 2–0 | 2–0 | 4–0 | |
| 2004–05 | Group stage (B) | (Qatar) Al Ahly Doha | 1–0 | 1–1 | 3rd place | |
| 2004–05 | Group stage (B) | (Saudi Arabia) Al Ittihad Djeddah | 0–2 | 0–2 | 3rd place | |
| 2004–05 | Group stage (B) | (Egypt) Ghazl El Mahalla SC | 2–0 | 0–0 | 3rd place | |
| 2006–07 | Round of 32 | (Sudan) Al-Merreikh | 3–0 | 0–2 | 3–2 | |
| 2006–07 | Round of 16 | (Saudi Arabia) Al Ittihad Djeddah | 4–1 | 1–3 | 5–4 | |
| 2006–07 | Group stage (B) | (Saudi Arabia) Al-Nassr | 1–0 | 2–1 | 1st place | |
| 2006–07 | Group stage (B) | (Jordan) Al-Faisaly | 0–0 | 0–1 | 1st place | |
| 2006–07 | Group stage (B) | Al Kuwait Kaifan | 0–0 | 1–0 | 1st place | |
| 2006–07 | Semi-finals | (Saudi Arabia) Al-Ahli | 2–0 | 0–1 | 2–1 | |
| 2006–07 | Final | (Jordan) Al-Faisaly | 1–1 | 1–0 | 2–1 | |
| 2007–08 | Round of 32 | (Mauritania) ASC Mauritel | 3–0 | 1–1 | 4–1 | |
| 2007–08 | Round of 16 | (Saudi Arabia) Al-Wahda Mecca | 3–1 | 1–1 | 4–2 | |
| 2007–08 | Group stage (A) | (Morocco) Raja Casablanca | 2–0 | 0–1 | 1st place | |
| 2007–08 | Group stage (A) | (Jordan) Al-Faisaly | 2–1 | 1–1 | 1st place | |
| 2007–08 | Group stage (A) | (Syria) Al-Majd | 1–1 | 4–0 | 1st place | |
| 2007–08 | Semi-finals | (Egypt) Tala'ea El-Gaish | 1–0 | 1–2 | 2–2 (a) | |
| 2007–08 | Final | (Morocco) Wydad Casablanca | 1–0 | 1–0 | 2–0 | |
| 2008–09 | Round 32 | (Lebanon) Al-Ansar | 3–2 | 0–0 | 3–2 | |
| 2008–09 | Round 16 | (Sudan) Al-Hilal Omdurman | w/o | 2–1 | w/o | |
| 2008–09 | Quarter finals | (Tunisia) US Monastir | 3–1 | 1–1 | 4–2 | |
| 2008–09 | Semi finals | (Tunisia) Espérance | 0–1 | 0–2 | 0–3 | |
| 2018–19 | First round | (United Arab Emirates) Al-Ain | 0–1 | 2–1 | 2–2 (a) | |
| 2018–19 | Second round | (Saudi Arabia) Al-Ahli Jeddah | 0–1 | 1–1 | 1–2 | |

== Other competitions ==
=== CAF Super Cup ===
| 21 February 2015 | ES Sétif (Algeria) | 1–1 (6–5 p) | (Egypt) Al-Ahly | Blida |
| 16:00 UTC+1 | Ziaya 68' | Report | Moteab 90+4' | Stadium: Stade Mustapha Tchaker; Attendance: 15,000; Referee: Noumandiez Doué (Ivory Coast) |
| | Penalties |
| | Delhoum (penalty scored); Mellouli (penalty scored); Benyettou (penalty scored); Dagoulou (penalty scored); Belameiri (penalty scored); Lamri (penalty scored) | | (penalty scored) Zakaria; (penalty scored) Said; (penalty scored) Moteab; (penalty scored) Samir; (penalty scored) Trezeguet; (penalty missed) Ali |

=== FIFA Club World Cup ===
| 13 December 2014 Quarter-finals | ES Sétif (Algeria) | 0–1 | (New Zealand) Auckland City | Rabat |
| 16:00 | | Report | Irving 52' | Stadium: Prince Moulay Abdellah Stadium; Attendance: 22,153; Referee: Pedro Proença (Portugal) |

| 17 December 2014 Match for fifth place | ES Sétif (Algeria) | 2–2 (5–4 p) | (Australia) Western Sydney Wanderers | Marrakesh |
| 16:30 | Mullen 50' (o.g.); Ziaya 57' | Report | Castelen 5'; Saba 89' | Stadium: Stade de Marrakech; Attendance: 18,458; Referee: Norbert Hauata (Tahiti) |
| | Penalties |
| | Djahnit (penalty missed); Gasmi (penalty scored); Belameiri (penalty scored); Ziaya (penalty missed); Mellouli (penalty scored); Arroussi (penalty missed); Megateli (penalty scored); Zerara (penalty scored) | | (penalty scored) Saba; (penalty missed) Haliti; (penalty scored) Trifiro; (penalty scored) Juric; (penalty missed) Bouzanis; (penalty missed) Mullen; (penalty scored) Fofanah; (penalty missed) Adeleke |

=== Afro-Asian Club Championship ===
| 12 January 1990 First leg | ES Sétif (Algeria) | 2–0 | (Qatar) Al Sadd SC | Constantine |
| 00:00 | Bendjaballah 41'; Ghrib 70' | | | Stadium: Mohamed Hamlaoui Stadium |

| 19 January 1990 Second leg | Al Sadd SC (Qatar) | 1–3 | (Algeria) ES Sétif | Doha |
| 00:00 | Gassem 86' (pen.) | | 25' Adjissa; 63', 75' Bendjaballah | Stadium: Khalifa International Stadium; Referee: Jassim Mandi (Bahrain) |

== Statistics by country ==
Statistics correct as of game against Al Ahly SC on 2022

=== CAF competitions ===
| Country | Club | P | W | D | L | GF | GA | GD |
|---|---|---|---|---|---|---|---|---|
| Algeria | USM Alger | 2 | 0 | 0 | 2 | 1 | 5 | −4 |
| Algeria | MC El Eulma | 2 | 1 | 1 | 0 | 3 | 2 | +1 |
| Algeria | MC Alger | 2 | 1 | 0 | 1 | 2 | 2 | +0 |
| Subtotal | | 6 | 2 | 1 | 3 | 6 | 9 | −3 |
| Angola | CRD Libolo | 2 | 1 | 0 | 1 | 5 | 5 | +0 |
| Angola | Santos FC | 2 | 1 | 0 | 1 | 6 | 1 | +5 |
| Subtotal | | 4 | 2 | 0 | 2 | 11 | 6 | +5 |
| Burkina Faso | ASFA Yennenga | 6 | 4 | 1 | 1 | 16 | 7 | +9 |
| Subtotal | | 6 | 4 | 1 | 1 | 16 | 7 | +9 |
| Cameroon | Canon Yaoundé | 2 | 0 | 1 | 1 | 1 | 2 | −1 |
| Cameroon | US Douala | 4 | 2 | 1 | 1 | 8 | 6 | +2 |
| Cameroon | Coton Sport FC | 4 | 3 | 0 | 1 | 5 | 4 | +1 |
| Subtotal | | 10 | 5 | 2 | 3 | 14 | 12 | +2 |
| Central African Republic | Olympic Real de Bangui | 2 | 1 | 1 | 0 | 6 | 0 | +6 |
| Subtotal | | 2 | 1 | 1 | 0 | 6 | 0 | +6 |
| (Republic of the Congo) Congo | Diables Noirs | 2 | 1 | 0 | 1 | 4 | 3 | +1 |
| (Republic of the Congo) Congo | AC Léopards | 2 | 1 | 0 | 1 | 4 | 4 | +0 |
| (Republic of the Congo) Congo | Étoile du Congo | 2 | 1 | 1 | 0 | 5 | 3 | +2 |
| Subtotal | | 6 | 3 | 1 | 2 | 13 | 10 | +3 |
| (Democratic Republic of the Congo) DR Congo | AS Vita Club | 4 | 1 | 2 | 1 | 6 | 5 | +1 |
| (Democratic Republic of the Congo) DR Congo | DC Motema Pembe | 2 | 1 | 0 | 1 | 3 | 2 | +1 |
| (Democratic Republic of the Congo) DR Congo | TP Mazembe | 8 | 1 | 4 | 3 | 11 | 16 | −5 |
| Subtotal | | 14 | 3 | 6 | 5 | 20 | 23 | −3 |
| Egypt | Al-Ahly | 6 | 2 | 1 | 3 | 6 | 11 | -5 |
| Egypt | ENPPI Club | 2 | 1 | 0 | 1 | 5 | 6 | −1 |
| Subtotal | | 8 | 3 | 1 | 4 | 11 | 17 | −6 |
| Gabon | FC 105 Libreville | 2 | 1 | 0 | 1 | 4 | 3 | +1 |
| Gabon | US Bitam | 2 | 1 | 0 | 1 | 2 | 2 | 0 |
| Subtotal | | 4 | 2 | 0 | 2 | 6 | 5 | +1 |
| (The Gambia) Gambia | Real Banjul | 2 | 1 | 1 | 0 | 3 | 1 | +2 |
| (The Gambia) Gambia | Fortune FC | 2 | 1 | 0 | 1 | 3 | 3 | +0 |
| Subtotal | | 4 | 2 | 1 | 1 | 6 | 4 | +2 |
| Ghana | Aduana Stars | 2 | 1 | 0 | 1 | 4 | 1 | +3 |
| Ghana | Asante Kotoko | 2 | 1 | 1 | 0 | 2 | 1 | +1 |
| Subtotal | | 4 | 2 | 1 | 1 | 6 | 2 | +4 |
| (Ghana) Guinea | Horoya AC | 2 | 2 | 0 | 0 | 4 | 2 | +2 |
| Subtotal | | 2 | 2 | 0 | 0 | 4 | 2 | +2 |
| Ivory Coast | SC Gagnoa | 2 | 1 | 0 | 1 | 5 | 2 | +3 |
| Subtotal | | 2 | 1 | 0 | 1 | 5 | 2 | +3 |
| Libya | Al-Ahly Benghazi | 4 | 2 | 1 | 1 | 4 | 2 | +2 |
| Libya | khaleej Sirte | 2 | 2 | 0 | 0 | 6 | 0 | +6 |
| Subtotal | | 6 | 4 | 1 | 1 | 10 | 2 | +8 |
| Mali | Stade Malien | 4 | 2 | 1 | 1 | 7 | 3 | +4 |
| Mali | Djoliba AC | 2 | 1 | 0 | 1 | 4 | 4 | 0 |
| Subtotal | | 6 | 3 | 1 | 2 | 11 | 7 | +4 |
| Mauritania | ASC SNIM | 2 | 2 | 0 | 0 | 7 | 1 | +6 |
| Mauritania | FC Nouadhibou | 2 | 1 | 0 | 1 | 3 | 3 | +0 |
| Subtotal | | 4 | 3 | 0 | 1 | 10 | 4 | +6 |
| Morocco | Olympique Khouribga | 2 | 1 | 0 | 1 | 2 | 2 | 0 |
| Morocco | FUS Rabat | 2 | 0 | 1 | 1 | 1 | 2 | −1 |
| Morocco | Raja Casablanca | 4 | 0 | 2 | 2 | 4 | 6 | -2 |
| Morocco | Difaâ El Jadidi | 2 | 1 | 1 | 0 | 3 | 2 | +1 |
| Morocco | Wydad Casablanca | 2 | 1 | 1 | 0 | 1 | 0 | +1 |
| Subtotal | | 12 | 3 | 5 | 4 | 11 | 12 | -1 |
| Nigeria | Bayelsa United | 2 | 1 | 1 | 0 | 2 | 1 | +1 |
| Nigeria | BCC Lions FC | 2 | 0 | 1 | 1 | 1 | 2 | −1 |
| Nigeria | Kaduna United | 2 | 1 | 0 | 1 | 1 | 3 | −2 |
| Nigeria | Iwuanyanwu Nationale | 2 | 1 | 0 | 1 | 4 | 1 | +3 |
| Nigeria | Enyimba | 2 | 1 | 0 | 1 | 4 | 2 | +2 |
| Subtotal | | 10 | 4 | 2 | 4 | 12 | 9 | +3 |
| Sierra Leone | Mighty Blackpool FC | 2 | 1 | 0 | 1 | 1 | 1 | +0 |
| Subtotal | | 2 | 1 | 0 | 1 | 1 | 1 | +0 |
| Senegal | ASC Linguère | 2 | 1 | 0 | 1 | 7 | 2 | +5 |
| Senegal | ASC Jeanne d'Arc | 2 | 1 | 0 | 1 | 3 | 2 | +1 |
| Subtotal | | 4 | 2 | 0 | 2 | 10 | 4 | +6 |
| South Africa | Orlando Pirates | 2 | 0 | 2 | 0 | 0 | 0 | +0 |
| South Africa | Mamelodi Sundowns | 1 | 0 | 0 | 1 | 0 | 2 | -2 |
| South Africa | AmaZulu | 2 | 1 | 0 | 1 | 2 | 1 | +1 |
| Subtotal | | 5 | 1 | 2 | 2 | 2 | 3 | -1 |
| Sudan | Al-Merreikh | 4 | 0 | 3 | 1 | 3 | 5 | −2 |
| Subtotal | | 4 | 0 | 3 | 1 | 3 | 5 | −2 |
| Tanzania | Simba SC | 2 | 1 | 0 | 1 | 3 | 3 | +0 |
| Subtotal | | 2 | 1 | 0 | 1 | 3 | 3 | +0 |
| Tunisia | ES Sahel | 2 | 1 | 0 | 1 | 3 | 2 | +1 |
| Tunisia | CS Sfaxien | 2 | 0 | 2 | 0 | 2 | 2 | +0 |
| Tunisia | Espérance de Tunis | 6 | 2 | 3 | 1 | 7 | 6 | +1 |
| Tunisia | CA Bizertin | 2 | 1 | 1 | 0 | 1 | 0 | +1 |
| Subtotal | | 12 | 4 | 6 | 2 | 13 | 10 | +3 |
| Uganda | Kampala City Council FC | 2 | 1 | 0 | 1 | 2 | 1 | +1 |
| Subtotal | | 2 | 1 | 0 | 1 | 2 | 1 | +1 |
| Zambia | Zanaco FC | 2 | 1 | 1 | 0 | 3 | 2 | +1 |
| Subtotal | | 2 | 1 | 1 | 0 | 3 | 2 | +1 |
| Zimbabwe | Dynamos FC | 2 | 1 | 0 | 1 | 3 | 1 | +2 |
| Subtotal | | 2 | 1 | 0 | 1 | 3 | 1 | +2 |
| Total | | 145 | 61 | 36 | 48 | 218 | 163 | +55 |

=== North Africa ===
| Country | Club | P | W | D | L | GF | GA | GD |
|---|---|---|---|---|---|---|---|---|
| Libya | Al Nasr | 2 | 2 | 0 | 0 | 6 | 3 | +3 |
| Subtotal | | 2 | 2 | 0 | 0 | 6 | 3 | +3 |
| Morocco | Raja Casablanca | 2 | 1 | 1 | 0 | 3 | 1 | +2 |
| Subtotal | | 2 | 1 | 1 | 0 | 3 | 1 | +2 |
| Tunisia | CS Sfaxien | 1 | 1 | 0 | 0 | 1 | 0 | +1 |
| Tunisia | Espérance de Tunis | 2 | 0 | 2 | 0 | 2 | 2 | 0 |
| Tunisia | Olympique Béja | 2 | 1 | 0 | 1 | 3 | 1 | +2 |
| Subtotal | | 5 | 2 | 2 | 1 | 6 | 3 | +3 |
| Total | | 9 | 5 | 3 | 1 | 15 | 7 | +8 |

=== UAFA (Non-CAF) competitions ===
Result summary by country
| Country | Pld | W | D | L | GF | GA | GD |
|---|---|---|---|---|---|---|---|
| Egypt | 4 | 2 | 1 | 1 | 4 | 2 | +2 |
| Jordan | 6 | 2 | 3 | 1 | 5 | 4 | +1 |
| Kuwait | 2 | 1 | 1 | 0 | 1 | 0 | +1 |
| Libya | 0 | 0 | 0 | 0 | 0 | 0 | 0 |
| (Lebanon) Libanon | 2 | 1 | 1 | 0 | 3 | 2 | +1 |
| Mauritania | 4 | 3 | 1 | 0 | 8 | 1 | +7 |
| Morocco | 4 | 3 | 0 | 1 | 4 | 1 | +3 |
| Saudi Arabia | 12 | 5 | 2 | 5 | 15 | 14 | +1 |
| Syria | 2 | 1 | 1 | 0 | 5 | 1 | +4 |
| Sudan | 3 | 2 | 0 | 1 | 5 | 3 | +2 |
| Qatar | 2 | 1 | 1 | 0 | 2 | 1 | +1 |
| Tunisia | 4 | 1 | 1 | 2 | 4 | 5 | -1 |
| (United Arab Emirates) Emirate | 2 | 1 | 0 | 1 | 2 | 2 | 0 |
| Total | 47 | 23 | 12 | 12 | 58 | 36 | +22 |

== Statistics ==
=== By season ===
Information correct as of May 14, 2022.
Key

- Pld = Played
- W = Games won
- D = Games drawn
- L = Games lost
- F = Goals for
- A = Goals against
- Grp = Group stage
- MFP = Match for fifth place
- PR = Preliminary round
- R1 = First round
- R2 = Second round
- PR = Play-off round
- R16 = Round of 16
- QF = Quarter-final
- SF = Semi-final

Key to colours and symbols:

| W | Winners |
| RU | Runners-up |

ES Sétif record in African football by season
| Season | Competition | Pld | W | D | L | GF | GA | GD | Round |
|---|---|---|---|---|---|---|---|---|---|
| 1981 | African Cup Winners' Cup | 4 | 1 | 1 | 2 | 3 | 7 | −4 | QF |
| 1987 | African Cup of Champions Clubs | 4 | 1 | 1 | 2 | 4 | 4 | +0 | R2 |
| 1988 | African Cup of Champions Clubs | 10 | 5 | 1 | 4 | 18 | 9 | +9 | W |
| 1989 | Afro-Asian Club Championship | 2 | 2 | 0 | 0 | 5 | 1 | +4 | W |
| 1989 | African Cup of Champions Clubs | 2 | 1 | 0 | 1 | 1 | 1 | +0 | R1 |
| 1991 | African Cup Winners' Cup | 8 | 3 | 1 | 4 | 16 | 8 | +8 | SF |
| 2008 | CAF Champions League | 4 | 3 | 0 | 1 | 9 | 3 | +6 | R1 |
| 2009 | CAF Confederation Cup | 16 | 9 | 1 | 6 | 33 | 21 | +12 | RU |
| 2010 | CAF Champions League | 12 | 5 | 4 | 3 | 21 | 11 | +10 | Grp |
| 2011 | CAF Champions League | 4 | 3 | 0 | 1 | 9 | 7 | +2 | R2 |
| 2011 | CAF Confederation Cup | 2 | 1 | 0 | 1 | 1 | 3 | −2 | R1 |
| 2012 | CAF Confederation Cup | 2 | 1 | 0 | 1 | 3 | 3 | +0 | R1 |
| 2013 | CAF Champions League | 4 | 2 | 0 | 2 | 9 | 8 | +1 | R2 |
| 2013 | CAF Confederation Cup | 8 | 2 | 3 | 3 | 7 | 9 | −2 | Grp |
| 2014 | CAF Champions League | 14 | 6 | 7 | 1 | 23 | 13 | +10 | W |
| 2014 | FIFA Club World Cup | 2 | 0 | 1 | 1 | 2 | 3 | −1 | MFP |
| 2015 | CAF Super Cup | 1 | 0 | 1 | 0 | 1 | 1 | +0 | W |
| 2015 | CAF Champions League | 10 | 2 | 5 | 3 | 12 | 15 | −3 | Grp |
| 2016 | CAF Champions League | 4 | 1 | 3 | 0 | 7 | 5 | +2 | Grp |
| 2018 | CAF Champions League | 14 | 6 | 4 | 4 | 20 | 13 | +7 | SF |
| 2020–21 | CAF Confederation Cup | 8 | 3 | 3 | 2 | 7 | 4 | +3 | Grp |
| 2021–22 | CAF Champions League | 14 | 6 | 2 | 6 | 15 | 17 | −2 | SF |
| Total | | 149 | 63 | 38 | 48 | 226 | 166 | +60 | |

=== Overall record ===
==== In Africa ====
As of 14 May 2022:

CAF competitions
| Competition | Seasons | Played | Won | Drawn | Lost | Goals For | Goals Against | Best results | Last season played |
|---|---|---|---|---|---|---|---|---|---|
| Champions League | 12 | 94 | 40 | 27 | 27 | 146 | 108 | (gold) (gold) Winners | 2021–22 |
| CAF Cup Winners' Cup (defunct) | 2 | 12 | 4 | 2 | 6 | 19 | 15 | (bronze); Semi-finals | 1991 |
| CAF Confederation Cup | 5 | 36 | 16 | 7 | 13 | 51 | 41 | (silver); Runners-up | 2020–21 |
| CAF Super Cup | 1 | 1 | 0 | 1 | 0 | 1 | 1 | (gold) Winners | 2015 |
| FIFA Club World Cup | 1 | 2 | 0 | 1 | 1 | 2 | 3 | 5 ^{th} | 2014 |
| Afro-Asian Club Championship (defunct) | 1 | 2 | 2 | 0 | 0 | 5 | 1 | (gold) Winners | 1989 |
| Total | 22 | 149 | 63 | 38 | 48 | 226 | 166 | | |

==== Non-CAF competitions ====
As of 4 December 2018:

Non-CAF competitions
| Competition | Seasons | Played | Won | Drawn | Lost | Goals For | Goals Against | Last season played |
|---|---|---|---|---|---|---|---|---|
| Arab Champions League | 5 | 44 | 22 | 11 | 11 | 54 | 33 | 2018–19 |
| Total | 5 | 44 | 22 | 11 | 11 | 54 | 33 | |

== International competitions goals ==
Statistics correct as of game against Al Ahly on May 14, 2022

| P | Player | TOTAL | CCL | CWC | ~~CAC~~ CCC | SC FCWC |
|---|---|---|---|---|---|---|
| 1 | (Algeria) Abdelmalek Ziaya | 23 | 6 | – | 15 | 2 |
| 2 | (Algeria) Akram Djahnit | 12 | 11 | – | 1 | – |
| 3 | (Algeria) El Hedi Belameiri | 8 | 8 | – | – | – |
| = | (Algeria) Mourad Delhoum | 10 | 7 | – | 3 | – |
| = | (Algeria) Lazhar Hadj Aïssa | 8 | 8 | – | – | – |
| 6 | (Algeria) Nabil Hemani | 7 | 6 | – | 1 | – |
| = | (Algeria) Lamouri Djediat | 7 | 4 | – | 3 | – |
| 8 | (Algeria) Mohamed Amine Aoudia | 6 | 3 | – | 3 | – |
| = | (Algeria) Nacer Adjissa | 6 | 6 | – | - | – |
| = | (Algeria) Abderrahim Bendjaballah | 6 | 6 | – | - | – |
| 11 | (Central African Republic) Eudes Dagoulou | 5 | 5 | – | – | – |
| = | (Algeria) Rachid Nadji | 5 | 5 | – | – | – |
| = | (Algeria) Riad Benayad | 5 | 5 | – | – | – |
| = | (Algeria) Bouazza Feham | 5 | 3 | – | 2 | – |
| 15 | (Algeria) Sofiane Younès | 4 | 4 | – | – | – |
| = | (Algeria) Hocine Metref | 4 | 1 | – | 3 | – |
| 17 | (Algeria) Youcef Ghazali | 3 | 3 | – | – | – |
| = | (Algeria) Habib Bouguelmouna | 3 | 3 | – | – | – |
| = | (Algeria) Zakaria Haddouche | 3 | 3 | – | – | – |
| = | (Algeria) Abdelmoumene Djabou | 3 | 3 | – | – | – |
| = | (Algeria) Hacène El Okbi | 3 | 2 | – | 1 | – |
| = | (Algeria) Ahmed Kendouci | 3 | 2 | – | 1 | – |
| = | (Algeria) Kaled Gourmi | 3 | 1 | – | 2 | – |
| = | (Algeria) Malik Zorgane | 3 | – | – | 3 | – |
| 25 | (Algeria) Laïd Madouni | 2 | 2 | – | – | – |
| = | (Algeria) Mohamed Benyettou | 2 | 2 | – | – | – |
| = | (Algeria) Abdelhakim Amokrane | 2 | 2 | – | – | – |
| = | (Algeria) Abderrahim Deghmoum | 2 | 2 | – | – | – |
| = | (Algeria) Mohamed Khoutir Ziti | 2 | 1 | – | 1 | – |
| = | (Algeria) Abderahmane Hachoud | 2 | 1 | – | 1 | – |
| = | (Cameroon) Francis Ambané | 2 | – | – | 2 | – |
| = | (Algeria) Mohamed Seguer | 2 | – | – | 2 | – |

| P | Player | TOTAL | CCL | CWC | ~~CAC~~ CCC | SC FCWC |
|---|---|---|---|---|---|---|
| = | (Algeria) Houssam Ghacha | 2 | 2 | – | – | – |
| = | (Algeria) Mohamed Islam Bakir | 2 | 2 | – | – | – |
| = | (Algeria) Mohamed El Amine Amoura | 2 | – | – | 2 | – |
| 28 | (Algeria) Toufik Zerara | 1 | 1 | – | – | – |
| = | (Algeria) Farid Mellouli | 1 | 1 | – | – | – |
| = | (Gabon) Benjamin Zé Ondo | 1 | 1 | – | – | – |
| = | (Algeria) Sofiane Bouchar | 1 | 1 | – | – | – |
| = | (Algeria) Ilyes Korbiaa | 1 | 1 | – | – | – |
| = | (Algeria) Miloud Rebiai | 1 | 1 | – | – | – |
| = | (Algeria) Mourad Benayad | 1 | 1 | – | – | – |
| = | (Algeria) Abdelkader Bedrane | 1 | 1 | – | – | – |
| = | (Algeria) Mehdi Kacem | 1 | 1 | – | – | – |
| = | (Algeria) Smaïl Diss | 1 | 1 | – | – | – |
| = | (Algeria) Mohamed Seghir Ferradji | 1 | 1 | – | – | – |
| = | (Ivory Coast) Serey Die | 1 | 1 | – | – | – |
| = | (Ivory Coast) Rémi Adiko | 1 | 1 | – | – | – |
| = | (Algeria) Farid Touil | 1 | 1 | – | – | – |
| = | (Algeria) Farès Mecheri | 1 | 1 | – | – | – |
| = | (Algeria) Chemseddine Nessakh | 1 | 1 | – | – | – |
| = | (Senegal) Isla Daoudi Diomande | 1 | 1 | – | – | – |
| = | (Algeria) Sofiane Bencharif | 1 | – | – | 1 | – |
| = | (Algeria) Lyes Boukria | 1 | – | – | 1 | – |
| = | (Algeria) Amine Aksas | 1 | – | – | 1 | – |
| = | (Algeria) Mokhtar Benmoussa | 1 | – | – | 1 | – |
| = | (Algeria) Monsef Bakrar | 1 | – | – | 1 | – |
| = | (Algeria) Amir Karaoui | 1 | – | – | 1 | – |
| = | (Algeria) Khalil Darfalou | 1 | 1 | – | – | – |
| = | Own Goals | 4 | 1 | – | 2 | 1 |
| Totals | | 176 | 122 | 0 | 51 | 3 |

=== Hat-tricks ===
| N | Date | Player | Match | Score | Time of goals |
|---|---|---|---|---|---|
| 1 | 22 April 1988 | Nacer Adjissa | ES Sétif – Stade Malien | 4–0 | 1', 76', 88' |
| 2 | 10 May 1991 | Malik Zorgane | ES Sétif – SC Gagnoa | 4–0 | 15', 19', 56' |
| 3 | 20 March 2016 | Eudes Dagoulou | ES Sétif – Étoile du Congo | 4–2 | 3', 49', 65' |
| 4 | 11 February 2018 | Zakaria Haddouche | ES Sétif – Real de Bangui | 6–0 | 13', 58', 76' |

=== Two goals one match ===
| N | Date | Player | Match | Score |
|---|---|---|---|---|
| 1 | 3 Apr 2009 | Djediat | ES Sétif – Khaleej Sirte | 5–0 |
| 2 | 19 Jul 2009 | Ziaya | ES Sétif – AS Vita Club | 2–0 |
| 3 | 2 Aug 2009 | Ziaya | ENPPI – ES Sétif | 3–4 |
| 4 | 28 Aug 2009 | Ziaya | ES Sétif – Santos | 6–0 |
| 5 | 29 Nov 2009 | Ziaya | ES Sétif – Stade Malien | 2–0 |
| 6 | 27 Feb 2010 | Delhoum | ES Sétif – Diables Noirs | 2–0 |
| 7 | 1 Aug 2010 | Hemani | TP Mazembe – ES Sétif | 2–2 |
| 8 | 27 Aug 2010 | Feham | ES Sétif – Dynamos | 3–0 |
| 9 | 11 Sep 2010 | Ghazali | Espérance de Tunis – ES Sétif | 2–2 |

| N | Date | Player | Match | Score |
|---|---|---|---|---|
| 10 | 6 Apr 2012 | Aoudia | ES Sétif – Simba | 3–1 |
| 11 | 5 Apr 2013 | Madouni | ES Sétif – ASFA Yennenga | 4–2 |
| 12 | 3 May 2013 | Delhoum | ES Sétif – AC Léopards | 3–1 |
| 13 | 2 Mar 2014 | El Okbi | ES Sétif – ASFA Yennenga | 5–0 |
| 14 | 9 Aug 2014 | Djahnit | ES Sétif – Espérance de Tunis | 2–2 |
| 15 | 19 Apr 2015 | Benyettou | Raja Casablanca – ES Sétif | 2–2 |
| 16 | 11 Feb 2018 | Djahnit | ES Sétif – Real de Bangui | 6–0 |
| 17 | 18 Mar 2022 | Benayad | ES Sétif – Horoya | 3–2 |

== Non-CAF competitions goals ==
| P | Player | Goals |
|---|---|---|
| 1 | (Algeria) Abdelmalek Ziaya | 10 |
| 2 | (Ivory Coast) Rémi Adiko | 8 |
| = | (Algeria) Farid Touil | 7 |
| 4 | (Algeria) El Yacine Derradj | 5 |
| 5 | (Algeria) Lamouri Djediat | 5 |
| 6 | (Algeria) Abdelmoumene Djabou | 3 |

| P | Player | Goals |
|---|---|---|
| 7 | (Algeria) Lazhar Hadj Aïssa | 2 |
| = | (Algeria) Abdelkader Laïfaoui | 2 |
| 9 | (Algeria) Keragel | 1 |
| = | (Algeria) Adel Maïza | 1 |
| = | (Algeria) Farés Fellahi | 1 |
| = | (Algeria) Farès Mecheri | 1 |

| P | Player | Goals |
|---|---|---|
| = | (Algeria) Hamza Banouh | 1 |
| = | (Algeria) Bachir Bensaďd | 1 |
| = | (Cameroon) Francis Ambané | 1 |
| = | (Mali) Souleymane Keïta | 1 |
| = | Own Goals | 0 |

== List of All-time appearances ==
This List of All-time appearances for ES Sétif in African competitions contains football players who have played for ES Sétif in African football competitions and have managed to accrue 20 or more appearances.

Gold Still playing competitive football in ES Sétif
Statistics correct as of game against Al Ahly on May 14, 2022

| # | Name | Position | CCL | CWC | CCC | SC FCWC | TOTAL | Date of first cap | Debut against | Date of last cap | Final match against |
|---|---|---|---|---|---|---|---|---|---|---|---|
| 1 | (Algeria) Akram Djahnit | AM | 44 | – | 13 | 3 | 60 | 25 Mar 2012 | Simba | 14 May 2022 | Al Ahly |
| 4 | (Algeria) Sofiane Khedairia | GK | 34 | – | 15 | 3 | 52 | 16 Mar 2013 | ASFA Yennenga | 14 May 2022 | Al Ahly |
| 2 | (Algeria) Mourad Delhoum | CM | 19 | – | 20 | 1 | 40 | 1 Mar 2008 | ASC SNIM | 9 Aug 2015 | Al-Merrikh |
| 3 | (Algeria) Abdelmalek Ziaya | ST | 18 | – | 13 | 3 | 34 | 15 Apr 2008 | ASC SNIM | 19 Apr 2016 | Al-Merrikh |
| 5 | (Algeria) Abdelkader Laïfaoui | CB | 13 | – | 15 | – | 28 | 15 Apr 2008 | ASC SNIM | 18 Sep 2010 | TP Mazembe |
| 6 | (Algeria) Sid Ali Lamri | AM | 20 | – | 5 | 2 | 27 | 19 Jul 2013 | TP Mazembe | 19 Apr 2016 | Al-Merrikh |
| 7 | (Algeria) Farouk Belkaid | DM | 12 | – | 14 | – | 26 | 3 Apr 2009 | Khaleej Sirte | 17 May 2013 | US Bitam |
| 8 | (Algeria) Riad Benchadi | LB | 10 | – | 15 | – | 25 | 1 Mar 2008 | ASC SNIM | 21 Sep 2013 | CA Bizertin |
| 9 | (Algeria) Slimane Raho | RB | 13 | – | 12 | – | 25 | 15 Apr 2008 | ASC SNIM | 11 Sep 2010 | Espérance ST |
| 10 | (Algeria) Smaïl Diss | CB | 9 | – | 15 | – | 24 | 13 Mar 2009 | Khaleej Sirte | 6 Apr 2012 | Simba |
| 11 | (Algeria) Hocine Metref | DM | 9 | – | 15 | – | 24 | 13 Mar 2009 | Khaleej Sirte | 18 Sep 2010 | TP Mazembe |
| 12 | (Algeria) Mohamed Lagraâ | DM / LB | 15 | – | 7 | 2 | 24 | 19 Jul 2013 | TP Mazembe | 1 May 2015 | Raja Casablanca |
| 13 | (Algeria) Bouazza Feham | AM | 8 | – | 15 | – | 23 | 13 Mar 2009 | Khaleej Sirte | 11 Sep 2010 | Espérance ST |
| 14 | (Algeria) Lazhar Hadj Aïssa | AM | 14 | – | 6 | – | 20 | 15 Apr 2008 | ASC SNIM | 18 Sep 2010 | TP Mazembe |
