= Al Sadd SC in international football =

Football club

Al-Sadd SC in Asian football
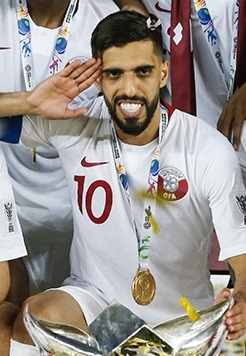
- Hassan Al-Haydos is Al-Sadd SC player with the highest match tally in international competitions, with 94 matches.
- Club: Al-Sadd SC
- Most appearances: Hassan Al-Haidos (94)
- Top scorer: Baghdad Bounedjah (30)
- First entry: 1988–89 Asian Club Championship
- Latest entry: 2024–25 AFC Champions League Elite

Titles
- Champions League: 2 1989, 2011

Al-Sadd SC, a Qatari professional association football club, has gained entry to Asian Football Confederation (AFC) competitions on several occasions. They have represented Qatar in the Champions League on nineteen occasions, the now-defunct Cup Winners' Cup on four occasions and FIFA Club World Cup on two occasions.

== History ==
Al Sadd SC whose team has regularly taken part in Asian Football Confederation (AFC) competitions. Qualification for Qatari clubs is determined by a team's performance in its domestic league and cup competitions, Al Sadd SC regularly qualifies for the primary Asian competition, the Asian Cup, by winning the Qatar Stars League or placing second or third. Al Sadd SC have also achieved Asian qualification via the Emir of Qatar Cup and have played in both the former Asian Club Championship and the Asian Cup Winners' Cup. The first match was against Al-Futowa and ended in victory for 4–1, as for the biggest win result was in 2023 against Al-Faisaly 6–0, and biggest loss firstly in 2014 against Al-Hilal and the secondly in 2015 away against Lokomotiv Tashkent 5–0 all in the AFC Champions League.

=== Al Sadd Crowned Champions of Asia in 1989: A Historic Milestone for Qatari Football ===
In a landmark achievement for both Qatari and Arab football, Al Sadd etched its name in Asian football history by clinching the 1988–89 Asian Club Championship (now known as the AFC Champions League), becoming the first Qatari club to win a continental title. The final stage of the tournament took place in Kuantan, Malaysia, where Al Sadd faced off against some of Asia’s top clubs. Despite the fierce competition, the Qatari side showed remarkable determination and resilience throughout the tournament, eventually advancing to the final.

In one of the most thrilling finals in the history of the Asian Club Championship, Al Sadd emerged as the 1989 champions after a dramatic two-legged clash against Iraq’s Al-Rasheed known today as Al-Karkh SC. The final was held under a home-and-away format. The first leg, played in Baghdad in front of over 10,000 fans, saw the home side start strong. Al-Rasheed raced to a 3–0 lead in the first half with goals from legendary forward Ahmed Radhi and a brace by Abdul-Kadhim. The Iraqis appeared poised to put the tie to bed. However, the resilient Al Sadd team mounted a crucial comeback in the second half. Goals from Khalid Salman and Mohammed Ghanim reduced the deficit to 3–2, giving the Qatari side two vital away goals heading into the second leg.

The return leg in Doha, held on the first day of Ramadan, was marked by intensity and anticipation. The first half ended in a goalless stalemate, seemingly favoring the visitors who only needed to avoid defeat to clinch the title. But in the 82nd minute, Al Sadd’s striker Salman produced a moment of magic, sending the home crowd into a frenzy and shifting the balance of the tie. Despite a late surge by Al-Rasheed, Al Sadd held firm. The aggregate score ended 3–3, but the Qataris were crowned champions thanks to the away goals rule a historic first for both the club and Qatari football. This unforgettable victory marked Al Sadd’s first Asian title, and made them the first Qatari club to lift a continental trophy, laying the foundation for future ambitions on the Asian stage.

=== Al Sadd’s Road to Glory: AFC Champions League 2011 Triumph ===
After a series of early exits from the group stages between 2006 and 2010, Al Sadd returned in 2011 to write a new chapter in their Asian football history and achieve a landmark that restored their continental prestige. Drawn into Group B, Al Sadd faced strong opponents such as Pakhtakor, Al-Nassr, and Esteghlal. However, the Qatari side surprised everyone by delivering a strong performance, finishing the group as leaders without a single defeat, and qualifying for the Round of 16 with high confidence. In the Round of 16, Al Sadd met a tough Saudi opponent, Al-Shabab in a one-legged knockout match. The team managed to secure a hard-fought 1–0 victory, thanks to a goal by Abdullah Koni and continuing their quest for the title. In the quarter-finals Al Sadd faced Sepahan of Iran. Despite a 1-0 defeat in the first leg, the AFC Disciplinary Committee later awarded Al Sadd a 3-0 forfeit win, after it was confirmed that Sepahan had fielded an ineligible player. Although Al Sadd lost again in the return leg, the official first-leg result was enough to see them through to the semi-finals.

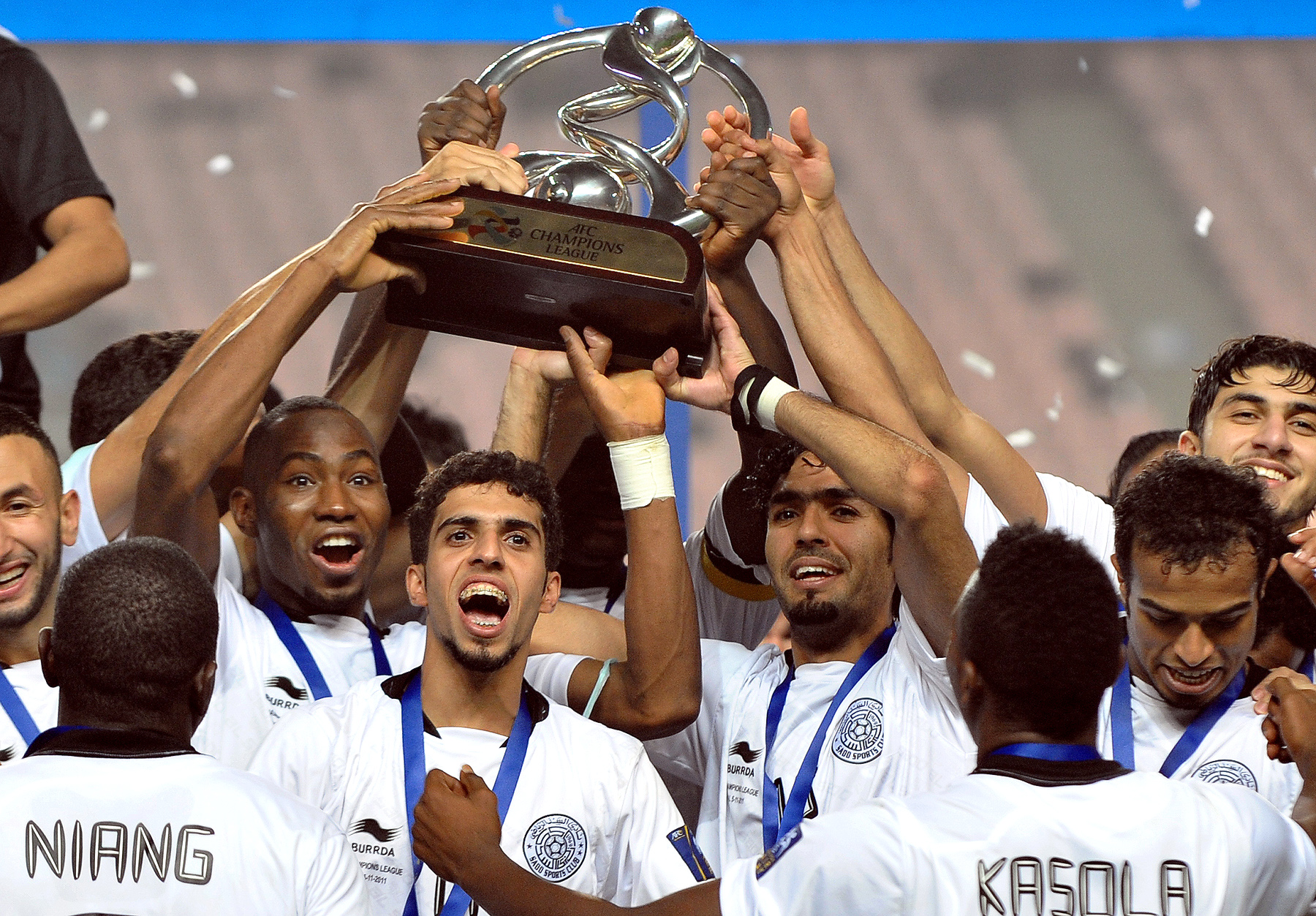
Al Sadd players celebrating their second time winning the ACL trophy

The semi-final presented a strong Korean challenge in the form of Suwon Samsung Bluewings. The first leg in South Korea ended 1-1 and Al Sadd managed to hold out for a 0–0 draw in the return leg in Doha, qualifying for the final on the away goals rule. The final was nothing short of dramatic. Held in South Korea, Al Sadd faced one of the continent’s most formidable sides Jeonbuk Hyundai Motors. Jeonbuk took the lead, but Al Sadd responded with goals from Sim Woo-Yeon against his own goal and Abdul Kader Keïta to go 2–1 ahead. In the dying minutes, Jeonbuk equalized to make it 2–2, sending the match into extra time and eventually penalties. In the shootout, Mohamed Saqr saved two penalties, which led Al Sadd to a 4–2 win, securing the club’s second AFC Champions League title, and the first under the tournament’s modern format. With this win, Al Sadd became the first Arab club to win the AFC Champions League in its current structure, earning a spot in the 2011 FIFA Club World Cup as Asia’s representative.

=== New era of AFC Champions League Elite ===
On 14 August 2023, it was confirmed that the new format would come into effect from the 2024–25 season, with the name of the competition changing to AFC Champions League Elite. The AFC has also confirmed that AFC Champions League records and statistics would be carried forward to the ACL Elite. The match between Al Sadd and Japan’s Kawasaki Frontale was one of the most thrilling encounters of the season’s AFC Champions League Elite quarterfinals. Despite Al Sadd’s strong performance and fighting spirit, the outcome wasn’t in their favor, as a decisive goal in extra time secured a 3–2 victory for the Japanese side. What made the clash so exciting was the rapid exchange of goals between the two teams. Al Sadd refused to back down each time they fell behind, responding with two equalizers a testament to their determination and resilience. However, Kawasaki’s physical edge and perhaps some small details during extra time ultimately tipped the balance in their favor.

== AFC competitions ==
=== Asian Club Championship ===
Al-Sadd SC results in Asian Club Championship
Season	Round	Opposition	Score	Venue
1988–89	Qualifying Group round	(Syria) Al-Futowa	4–1	(Doha, Qatar)
1988–89	Qualifying Group round	(Lebanon) Al-Ansar	1–0	(Doha, Qatar)
1988–89	Qualifying Group round	(Iraq) Al-Rasheed	0–0	(Doha, Qatar)
1988–89	SF Group round	(Malaysia) Pahang FA	0–2	(Kuantan, Malaysia)
1988–89	SF Group round	(Bangladesh) Mohammedan SC	2–2	(Kuantan, Malaysia)
1988–89	SF Group round	(North Korea) April 25	2–1	(Kuantan, Malaysia)
1988–89	SF Group round	(Saudi Arabia) Al-Ittifaq	2–1	(Kuantan, Malaysia)
1988–89	Final	(Iraq) Al-Rasheed	3–2; 1–0 (a)	(Al-Shaab Stadium, Baghdad) (Jassim bin Hamad Stadium, Doha)
1989–90	Group stage	(Iraq) Al Rasheed	0–3	(Amman, Jordan)
1989–90	Group stage	(Lebanon) Al Ansar	2–0	(Amman, Jordan)
1989–90	Group stage	(Yemen) Al-Ahli	0–0	(Amman, Jordan)
1989–90	Group stage	(Jordan) Al Deffatain	3–0	(Amman, Jordan)
1990–91	First Round	(Iran) Esteghlal	1-1; 0-1	(Doha) (Tahran)
1999–2000	First round	(United Arab Emirates) Al-Wahda	2–2; 1–1 (a)	(Abu Dhabi) (Doha)
1999–2000	Second round	(Saudi Arabia) Al-Hilal	0–1; 2–1	(Doha) (Riyadh)

=== Cup Winners' Cup ===
Al-Sadd SC results in Asian Cup Winners' Cup
Season	Round	Opposition	Home	Away	Aggregate
1991–92	First round	(Kuwait) Kazma	1–1	1–1	2–2 (2–4 p)
1994–95	Second round	(Kuwait) Al Qadisiya	2–0	(w/o)	2–0
1994–95	Quarterfinals	(Saudi Arabia) Al Ittihad	0–2	0–0	0–2
2000–01	First round	(Iraq) Al-Talaba	1–1	3–3	4–4 (a)
2000–01	Second round	(Iran) Esteghlal	0–1	1–2	1–3
2001–02	First round	(Iran) Fajr Sepasi	1–1	1–1	2–2 (5–3 p)
2001–02	Second round	(Saudi Arabia) Al-Shabab	3–2	0–0	3–2
2001–02	Quarterfinals	(United Arab Emirates) Al Ain	1–0	1–2	2–2 (a)
2001–02	Semifinals	(Saudi Arabia) Al Hilal	Single match		0–1
2001–02	Third place	(China) Chongqing Longxin	Single match		0–0 (7–6 p)

=== Champions League ===
Al-Sadd SC results in AFC Champions League
Season	Round	Opposition	Home	Away	Aggregate	Ref.
2002–03	Group stage	(Iran) Esteghlal	1–2		2nd place	
2002–03	Group stage	(United Arab Emirates) Al-Ain	0–2		2nd place	
2002–03	Group stage	(Saudi Arabia) Al-Hilal	3–1		2nd place	
2004	Group stage	(Iraq) Al-Quwa Al-Jawiya	1–0	0–1	2nd place	
2004	Group stage	(United Arab Emirates) Al-Wahda	0–0	0–0	2nd place	
2005	Group stage	(United Arab Emirates) Al-Ahli	2–0	1–2	1st place	
2005	Group stage	Al Kuwait	1–0	1–0	1st place	
2005	Group stage	(Uzbekistan) Neftchi	3–2	0–2	1st place	
2005	Round of 16	(South Korea) Busan I'Park	1–2	0–3	1–5	
2006	Group stage	(Saudi Arabia) Al-Shabab	2–3	0–0	2nd place	
2006	Group stage	(Kuwait) Al-Arabi	4–1	2–1	2nd place	
2006	Group stage	(Iraq) Al-Quwa Al-Jawiya	3–0	2–0	2nd place	
2007	Group stage	(Syria) Al-Karamah	1–1	1–2	4th place	
2007	Group stage	(Iraq) Najaf FC	1–4	0–1	4th place	
2007	Group stage	(Uzbekistan) Neftchi	2–0	1–2	4th place	
2008	Group stage	(Saudi Arabia) Al-Ahli	2–1	2–2	3rd place	
2008	Group stage	(United Arab Emirates) Al-Wahda	0–0	2–2	3rd place	
2008	Group stage	(Syria) Al-Karamah	0–2	0–1	3rd place	
2010	Group stage	(Saudi Arabia) Al-Hilal	0–3	0–0	3rd place	
2010	Group stage	(United Arab Emirates) Al-Ahli	2–2	5–0	3rd place	
2010	Group stage	(Iran) Mes Kerman	4–1	1–3	3rd place	
2011	Group stage	(Iran) Esteghlal	2–2	1–1	1st place	
2011	Group stage	(Uzbekistan) Pakhtakor	2–1	1–1	1st place	
2011	Group stage	(Saudi Arabia) Al-Nassr	1–0	1–1	1st place	
2011	Round of 16	(Saudi Arabia) Al-Shabab	Single match		1–0	
2011	Quarter-finals	(Iran) Sepahan	1–2	3–0	4–2	
2011	Semi-finals	(South Korea) Suwon Samsung Bluewings	0–1	2–0	2–1	
2011	Final	(South Korea) Jeonbuk Hyundai Motors	Single match		2–2 (4–2 p)	
2014	Group stage	(Iran) Sepahan	3–1	0–4	2nd place	
2014	Group stage	(United Arab Emirates) Al-Ahli	2–1	1–1	2nd place	
2014	Group stage	(Saudi Arabia) Al-Hilal	2–2	0–5	2nd place	
2014	Round of 16	(Iran) Foolad	0–0	2–2	2–2 (a)	
2014	Quarter-finals	(Saudi Arabia) Al-Hilal	0–0	0–1	0–1	
2015	Play-off round	(United Arab Emirates) Al-Wahda	Single match		4–4 (5–4 p)	
2015	Group stage	(Iran) Foolad	1–0	0–0	2nd place	
2015	Group stage	(Saudi Arabia) Al-Hilal	1–0	1–2	2nd place	
2015	Group stage	(Uzbekistan) Lokomotiv Tashkent	6–2	0–5	2nd place	
2015	Round of 16	(Qatar) Lekhwiya	1–2	2–2	3–4	
2016	Play-off round	(United Arab Emirates) Al-Jazira	Single match		2–2 (4–5 p)	
2017	Play-off round	(Iran) Esteghlal	Single match		0–0 (3–4 p)	
2018	Group stage	(United Arab Emirates) Al-Wasl	2–1	2–1	2nd place	
2018	Group stage	(Iran) Persepolis	3–1	0–1	2nd place	
2018	Group stage	(Uzbekistan) Nasaf Qarshi	4–0	0–1	2nd place	
2018	Round of 16	(Saudi Arabia) Al-Ahli	2–1	2–2	4–3	
2018	Quarter-finals	(Iran) Esteghlal	2–2	3–1	5–3	
2018	Semi-finals	(Iran) Persepolis	0–1	1–1	1–2	
2019	Group stage	(Saudi Arabia) Al-Ahli	2–1	0–2	1st place	
2019	Group stage	(Iran) Persepolis	1–0	0–2	1st place	
2019	Group stage	(Uzbekistan) Pakhtakor	2–1	2–2	1st place	
2019	Round of 16	(Qatar) Al-Duhail	3–1	1–1	4–2	
2019	Quarter-finals	(Saudi Arabia) Al-Nassr	3–1	1–2	4–3	
2019	Semi-finals	(Saudi Arabia) Al-Hilal	1–4	4–2	5–6	
2020 (Note: On 9 July 2020, AFC announced new schedule for 2020 AFC Champions League group stage. On 16 July 2020, AFC announced that Qatar would host 2020 AFC Champions League in the West region from the group stage to the semi-finals. On 27 July 2020, AFC confirmed that Malaysia would host matches of Group G and H.)	Group stage	(Saudi Arabia) Al-Nassr	1–1	2–2	2nd place	
2020	Group stage	(Iran) Sepahan	3–0	1–2	2nd place	
2020	Group stage	(United Arab Emirates) Al-Ain	4–0	3–3	2nd place	
2020	Round of 16	(Iran) Persepolis	Single match		0–1	
2021 (Note: On 11 March 2021, AFC confirmed the hosts for the group stage, except for Group H and I whose hosts will be decided at a later date. On 10 May 2021, AFC confirmed the hosts for Group H and I.)	Group stage	(Iran) Foolad	1–1	1–0	2nd place	
2021	Group stage	(Saudi Arabia) Al-Nassr	1–2	1–3	2nd place	
2021	Group stage	(Jordan) Al-Wehdat	3–1	2–0	2nd place	
2022	Group stage	(Uzbekistan) Nasaf Qarshi	1–1	1–3	3rd place	
2022	Group stage	(Saudi Arabia) Al-Faisaly	1–0	1–2	3rd place	
2022	Group stage	(Jordan) Al-Wehdat	5–2	1–3	3rd place	
2023–24	Group stage	(United Arab Emirates) Sharjah	0–0	2–0	2nd place	
2023–24	Group stage	(Uzbekistan) Nasaf	2–2	1–3	2nd place	
2023–24	Group stage	(Jordan) Al-Faisaly	6–0	0–2	2nd place	
2024–25	Group stage	(United Arab Emirates) Al Ain	—N/a	1–1	4th place	
2024–25	Group stage	(Iran) Esteghlal	2–0	—N/a	4th place	
2024–25	Group stage	(Iran) Persepolis	1–0	—N/a	4th place	
2024–25	Group stage	(United Arab Emirates) Al Wasl	—N/a	1–1	4th place	
2024–25	Group stage	(Saudi Arabia) Al-Hilal	1–1	—N/a	4th place	
2024–25	Group stage	(Saudi Arabia) Al-Nassr	—N/a	2–1	4th place	
2024–25	Group stage	(Saudi Arabia) Al-Ahli	1–3	—N/a	4th place	
2024–25	Group stage	(Uzbekistan) Pakhtakor	—N/a	1–2	4th place	
2024–25	Round of 16	(United Arab Emirates) Al-Wasl	3–1	1–1	4–2	
2024–25	Quarter-finals	(Japan) Kawasaki Frontale	Single match		2–3	

== Non-AFC competitions ==
Non-AFC competition record
Season	Competition	Round	Opposition	Score	Venue
1992	Arab Cup Winners' Cup	Group stage	(Morocco) CO Casablanca	0–3	(Prince Abdullah Al Faisal Stadium, Jeddah)
1992	Arab Cup Winners' Cup	Group stage	(Palestine) Haifa SC	5–0	(Prince Abdullah Al Faisal Stadium, Jeddah)
1992	Arab Cup Winners' Cup	Group stage	(Sudan) Al-Merrikh	1–1	(Prince Abdullah Al Faisal Stadium, Jeddah)
1992	Arab Cup Winners' Cup	Semi-final	(Saudi Arabia) Al-Ittihad Jeddah	2–1	(Prince Abdullah Al Faisal Stadium, Jeddah)
1992	Arab Cup Winners' Cup	Final	(Morocco) CO Casablanca	0–2	(Prince Abdullah Al Faisal Stadium, Jeddah)
2001	Arab Club Champions Cup	Group stage	(Yemen) Al-Ahli Sana'a	1–2	(Jassim Bin Hamad Stadium, Doha)
2001	Arab Club Champions Cup	Group stage	(Syria) Hutteen SC	6–1	(Jassim Bin Hamad Stadium, Doha)
2001	Arab Club Champions Cup	Group stage	(Algeria) MC Oran	7–0	(Jassim Bin Hamad Stadium, Doha)
2001	Arab Club Champions Cup	Semi-final	(Qatar) Al Rayyan SC	5–1	(Jassim Bin Hamad Stadium, Doha)
2001	Arab Club Champions Cup	Final	(Algeria) MC Oran	3–1	(Jassim Bin Hamad Stadium, Doha)
2023	Arab Club Champions Cup	Group stage	(Morocco) Wydad AC	0–0	(Prince Sultan bin Abdul Aziz Stadium, Abha)
2023	Arab Club Champions Cup	Group stage	(Saudi Arabia) Al-Hilal	3–2	(Prince Sultan bin Abdul Aziz Stadium, Abha)
2023	Arab Club Champions Cup	Group stage	(Libya) Al-Ahli Tripoli	1–0	(Damac Club Stadium, Khamis Mushait)
2023	Arab Club Champions Cup	Quarter-finals	(Iraq) Al-Shorta	2–4	(Prince Sultan bin Abdul Aziz Stadium, Abha)

== Other competitions ==
=== FIFA Club World Cup ===
11 December 2011 Quarter-finals	Espérance de Tunis (Tunisia)	1–2	(Qatar) Al-Sadd SC	Toyota
16:00	Darragi 60'	Report	Khalfan 33'; Koni 49'	Stadium: Toyota Stadium; Attendance: 21,251; Referee: Enrique Osses (Chile)

15 December 2011 Semi-finals	Al-Sadd SC (Qatar)	0–4	(Spain) Barcelona	Yokohama
19:30		Report	Adriano 25', 43'; Keita 64'; Maxwell 81'	Stadium: International Stadium Yokohama; Attendance: 66,298; Referee: Joel Aguilar (El Salvador)

18 December 2011 Match for third place	Kashiwa Reysol (Japan)	0–0 (3–5 p)	(Qatar) Al-Sadd SC	Yokohama
16:30		Report		Stadium: International Stadium Yokohama; Attendance: 60,527; Referee: Noumandiez Doué (Ivory Coast)
	Penalties
	Jorge Wagner (penalty scored); Sawa (penalty scored); Hayashi (penalty missed); Otani (penalty scored)		(penalty scored) Niang; (penalty scored) Keïta; (penalty scored) Majid; (penalty scored) Al-Haydos; (penalty scored) Belhadj

11 December 2019 First round	Al-Sadd (Qatar)	3–1 (a.e.t.)	(New Caledonia) Hienghène Sport	Doha
20:30	Bounedjah 26'; Hassan 100'; Pedro Miguel 114'	Report	Roine 46'	Stadium: Jassim bin Hamad Stadium; Attendance: 7,047; Referee: Mustapha Ghorbal (Algeria)

14 December 2019 Second round	Monterrey (Mexico)	3–2	(Qatar) Al-Sadd	Doha
20:30	Vangioni 23'; Funes Mori 45+1'; Rodríguez 77'	Report	Bounedjah 66'; Hassan 89'	Stadium: Jassim bin Hamad Stadium; Attendance: 4,878; Referee: Ovidiu Hațegan (Romania)

17 December 2019 Fifth place	Al-Sadd (Qatar)	2–6	(Tunisia) Espérance de Tunis	Doha
17:30	Bounedjah 32' (pen.); Al-Haydos 49' (pen.)	Report	Elhouni 6', 42', 74'; Badri 13', 25' (pen.); Derbali 87'	Stadium: Khalifa International Stadium; Attendance: 15,037; Referee: Abdelkader Zitouni (Tahiti)

=== Afro-Asian Club Championship ===
12 January 1990 First leg	ES Sétif (Algeria)	2–0	(Qatar) Al-Sadd SC	Constantine
00:00	Bendjaballah 41'; Ghrib 70'			Stadium: Mohamed Hamlaoui Stadium

19 January 1990 Second leg	Al-Sadd SC (Qatar)	1–3	(Algeria) ES Sétif	Doha
00:00	Gassem 86' (pen.)		25' Adjissa; 63', 75' Bendjaballah	Stadium: Khalifa International Stadium; Referee: Jassim Mandi (Bahrain)

== Statistics ==
=== By season ===
Information correct as of 27 April 2025.
Key

- Pld = Played
- W = Games won
- D = Games drawn
- L = Games lost
- F = Goals for
- A = Goals against
- Grp = Group stage
- PR = Preliminary round
- R1 = First round
- R2 = Second round
- PO = Play-off round
- R16 = Round of 16
- QF = Quarter-final
- SF = Semi-final

Key to colours and symbols:

W	Winners
RU	Runners-up

Al-Sadd SC record in Asian football by season
Season	Competition	Pld	W	D	L	GF	GA	GD	Round
1988–89	Asian Club Championship	9	6	2	1	16	8	+8	W
1989	Afro-Asian Club Championship	2	0	0	2	1	5	−4	RU
1989–90	Asian Club Championship	4	1	1	2	2	6	−4	Grp
1990–91	Asian Club Championship	2	0	1	1	1	2	−1	Grp
1991–92	Asian Cup Winners' Cup	2	0	2	0	2	2	+0	R1
1994–95	Asian Cup Winners' Cup	2	0	1	1	0	2	−2	QF
1999–2000	Asian Club Championship	4	0	3	1	4	6	−2	R2
2000–01	Asian Cup Winners' Cup	4	0	2	2	5	7	−2	R2
2001–02	Asian Cup Winners' Cup	8	2	4	2	7	7	+0	3rd
2002–03	Champions League	3	1	0	2	4	5	−1	Grp
2004	Champions League	4	1	2	1	1	1	+0	Grp
2005	Champions League	8	4	0	4	9	11	−2	QF
2006	Champions League	6	4	1	1	13	5	+8	Grp
2007	Champions League	6	1	1	4	6	10	−4	Grp
2008	Champions League	6	1	3	2	6	8	−2	Grp
2010	Champions League	6	2	2	2	12	9	+3	Grp
2011	Champions League	14	7	5	2	24	12	+12	W
2011	FIFA Club World Cup	3	1	1	1	2	5	−3	3rd
2014	Champions League	10	2	5	3	10	17	−7	QF
2015	Champions League	10	3	4	3	16	17	−1	R16
2016	Champions League	1	0	1	0	2	2	+0	PO
2017	Champions League	1	0	1	0	0	0	+0	PO
2018	Champions League	12	6	3	3	21	13	0	SF
2019	Champions League	12	6	2	4	20	19	+1	SF
2020	Champions League	8	2	3	2	14	9	+5	R16
2019	FIFA Club World Cup	3	1	0	2	7	10	−3	5th
2021	Champions League	6	3	1	2	9	7	+2	Grp
2022	Champions League	6	2	1	3	10	11	−1	Grp
2024	Champions League	6	2	2	2	11	7	+4	Grp
2025	Champions League	11	4	4	3	16	14	+2	QF
Total		179	62	58	58	251	237	+14	

=== Overall record ===
==== In Asia ====
As of 27 April 2025:

AFC competitions
Competition	Seasons	Played	Won	Drawn	Lost	Goals For	Goals Against	Last season played
Champions League	19	136	51	41	43	204	177	2024–25
Asian Club Championship (defunct)	4	19	7	7	5	23	22	1999–2000
Cup Winners' Cup (defunct)	4	16	2	9	5	14	18	2001–02
Afro-Asian Club Championship (defunct)	1	2	0	0	2	1	5	1989
FIFA Club World Cup	2	6	2	1	3	9	15	2019
Total	30	179	62	58	58	251	237	

==== Non-AFC competitions ====
As of 5 August 2023:

Non-AFC competitions
Competition	Seasons	Played	Won	Drawn	Lost	Goals For	Goals Against	Last season played
Arab Champions League	2	9	6	1	2	28	11	2023
Arab Cup Winners' Cup (defunct)	1	5	2	1	2	8	7	1992
Total	3	14	8	2	4	36	18	

== Statistics by country ==
Statistics correct as of game against Kawasaki Frontale on April 27, 2025

=== AFC competitions ===
Country	Club	P	W	D	L	GF	GA	GD
Bahrain	Riffa	1	0	1	0	0	0	+0
Subtotal		1	0	1	0	0	0	+0
Bangladesh	Mohammedan SC	1	0	1	0	2	2	+0
Subtotal		1	0	1	0	2	2	+0
China PR	Chongqing Longxin	1	0	1	0	0	0	+0
Subtotal		1	0	1	0	0	0	+0
Iran	Esteghlal	9	2	4	3	12	11	+1
Iran	Fajr Sepasi	2	0	2	0	2	2	+0
Iran	Mes Kerman	2	1	0	1	5	4	+1
Iran	Sepahan	6	3	0	3	11	9	+2
Iran	Foolad	6	2	4	0	5	3	+2
Iran	Persepolis	8	3	1	4	6	7	−1
Subtotal		33	11	11	11	41	36	+5
Iraq	Al-Rasheed	4	1	1	2	3	6	−3
Iraq	Al-Talaba	2	0	2	0	4	4	+0
Iraq	Al-Quwa Al-Jawiya	4	3	0	1	6	1	+5
Iraq	Najaf FC	2	0	0	2	1	5	−4
Subtotal		12	4	3	5	14	16	−2
India	Dempo	1	1	0	0	2	0	+2
Subtotal		1	1	0	0	2	0	+2
Jordan	Al-Wehdat (Ex Al Deffatain)	5	3	0	2	11	9	+1
Jordan	Al-Faisaly	2	1	0	1	6	2	+4
Subtotal		7	4	0	3	17	11	+6
Japan	Kawasaki Frontale	1	0	0	1	2	3	−1
Subtotal		1	0	0	1	2	3	−1
Kuwait	Kazma	2	0	2	0	2	2	+0
Kuwait	Al Kuwait	2	2	0	0	2	0	+2
Kuwait	Al Qadisiya	1	1	0	0	2	0	+2
Kuwait	Al-Arabi	2	2	0	0	6	2	+4
Subtotal		7	5	2	0	12	4	+8
Lebanon	Al-Ansar	2	2	0	0	3	0	+3
Subtotal		2	2	0	0	3	0	+3
Malaysia	Pahang FA	1	1	0	0	2	0	+2
Subtotal		1	1	0	0	2	0	+2
(North Korea) Korea DPR	April 25	1	1	0	0	2	1	+1
Subtotal		1	1	0	0	2	1	+1
Qatar	Lekhwiya	2	0	1	1	3	4	−1
Qatar	Al-Duhail	2	1	1	0	4	2	+2
Subtotal		4	1	2	1	7	6	+1
Saudi Arabia	Al-Ittifaq	1	1	0	0	2	1	+1
Saudi Arabia	Al Ittihad	2	0	1	1	0	2	−2
Saudi Arabia	Al-Hilal	15	3	4	8	14	25	−11
Saudi Arabia	Al-Shabab	5	2	2	1	6	5	+1
Saudi Arabia	Al-Ahli	7	3	2	2	11	12	−1
Saudi Arabia	Al-Nassr	9	3	3	3	13	13	+0
Saudi Arabia	Al-Faisaly	2	1	0	1	2	2	+0
Subtotal		41	13	12	16	48	60	−12
(South Korea) Korea Republic	Busan I'Park	2	0	0	2	1	5	−4
(South Korea) Korea Republic	Suwon Samsung Bluewings	2	1	0	1	2	1	+1
(South Korea) Korea Republic	Jeonbuk Hyundai Motors	1	0	1	0	2	2	+0
Subtotal		5	1	1	3	5	8	−3
Syria	Al-Futowa	1	1	0	0	4	1	+3
Syria	Al-Karamah	4	0	1	3	2	6	−4
Syria	Al-Ittihad	1	1	0	0	5	1	+4
Subtotal		6	2	1	3	11	8	+3
United Arab Emirates	Al-Wahda	7	0	7	0	9	9	+0
United Arab Emirates	Al-Ain	6	2	2	2	10	8	+2
United Arab Emirates	Al-Ahli	6	3	2	1	13	6	+7
United Arab Emirates	Al-Jazira	1	0	1	0	2	2	+0
United Arab Emirates	Al-Wasl	5	3	1	1	9	5	+4
United Arab Emirates	Sharjah	2	1	1	0	2	0	+2
Subtotal		27	9	15	3	45	30	+15
Uzbekistan	Neftchi	4	2	0	2	6	6	+0
Uzbekistan	Pakhtakor	5	2	2	1	8	7	+1
Uzbekistan	Lokomotiv Tashkent	2	1	0	1	6	7	−1
Uzbekistan	Nasaf Qarshi	4	1	1	2	6	5	+1
Uzbekistan	Nasaf	2	0	1	1	3	5	−2
Subtotal		17	6	4	7	29	30	−1
Yemen	Al-Ahli Sanaa	1	0	1	0	0	0	+0
Subtotal		1	0	1	0	0	0	+0
Total		172	61	55	53	242	215	+27

=== FIFA competitions ===
Country	Club	P	W	D	L	GF	GA	GD
Algeria	ES Sétif	2	0	0	2	1	5	−4
Subtotal		2	0	0	2	1	5	−4
Japan	Kashiwa Reysol	1	0	1	0	0	0	+0
Subtotal		1	0	1	0	0	0	+0
Mexico	Monterrey	1	0	0	1	2	3	−1
Subtotal		1	0	0	1	2	3	−1
New Caledonia	Hienghène Sport	1	1	0	0	3	1	+2
Subtotal		1	1	0	0	3	1	+2
Spain	Barcelona	1	0	0	1	0	4	−4
Subtotal		1	0	0	1	0	4	−4
Tunisia	Espérance de Tunis	2	1	0	1	4	7	−3
Subtotal		2	1	0	1	4	7	−3
Total		8	2	1	5	10	20	−10

=== Non-AFC competitions ===
Result summary by country
Country	Pld	W	D	L	GF	GA	GD
Algeria	2	2	0	0	10	1	+9
Qatar	1	1	0	0	5	1	+4
Morocco	3	0	1	2	0	5	−5
Palestine	1	1	0	0	5	0	+5
Sudan	1	0	1	0	1	1	+0
Saudi Arabia	2	2	0	0	5	3	+2
Syria	1	1	0	0	6	1	+5
Libya	1	1	0	0	1	0	+1
Iraq	1	0	0	1	2	4	−2
Yemen	1	0	0	1	1	2	−1
Total	14	8	2	4	36	18	+18

== Asian competitions goals ==
Statistics correct as April 27, 2025

P	Player	TOTAL	ACL	AWC	AACC FCWC
1	(Algeria) Baghdad Bounedjah	30	27	–	3
2	(Qatar) Akram Afif	16	16	–	–
3	(Qatar) Khalfan Ibrahim	13	13	–	–
=	(Qatar) Hassan Al-Haidos	13	12	–	1
5	(Brazil) Leandro	8	8	–	–
=	(Ecuador) Carlos Tenorio	8	8	–	–
=	(Qatar) Boualem Khoukhi	8	8	–	–
8	(Ivory Coast) Abdul Kader Keïta	6	6	–	–
=	(Qatar) Rodrigo Tabata	6	6	–	–
10	(Algeria) Nadir Belhadj	5	5	–	–
=	(Qatar) Hassan Jawhar	5	5	–	–
=	(Iran) Ibrahim Qassem poor	5	5	–	–
=	(Spain) Santi Cazorla	5	5	–	–
=	(Qatar) Yusef Ahmed	5	5	–	–
=	(Qatar) Abdelkarim Hassan	5	3	–	2
16	(Qatar) Talal Al-Bloushi	4	4	–	–
=	(Spain) Xavi	4	4	–	–
=	(Qatar) Ali Assadalla	4	4	–	–
=	(Brazil) Emerson Sheik	4	4	–	–
20	(Qatar) Majdi Siddiq	3	3	–	–
=	(Brazil) Felipe	3	3	–	–
=	(Senegal) Mamadou Niang	3	3	–	–
=	(Qatar) Jafal Rashed Al-Kuwari	3	3	–	–
=	(Qatar) Magid Mohamed	3	3	–	–
=	(Qatar) Mohammed Gholam	3	3	–	–
26	(Qatar) Hussein Yasser	2	2	–	–
=	(Qatar) Hamza Sanhaji	2	2	–	–

P	Player	TOTAL	ACL	AWC	AACC FCWC
=	(Iran) Hossein Kaebi	2	2	–	–
=	(Brazil) Muriqui	2	2	–	–
=	(South Korea) Lee Jung-soo	2	2	–	–
=	(Brazil) Sérgio Ricardo	2	2	–	–
=	(Qatar) Ali Afif	2	2	–	–
=	(South Korea) Nam Tae-hee	2	2	–	–
=	(Ecuador) Gonzalo Plata	2	2	–	–
=	(Qatar) Mostafa Meshaal	2	2	–	–
=	(Brazil) Paulo Otávio	2	2	–	–
=	(Colombia) Mateus Uribe	2	2	–	–
38	(Algeria) Jugurtha Hamroun	1	1	–	–
=	(Qatar) Pedro Miguel	1	–	–	1
=	(Brazil) Grafite	1	1	–	–
=	(Qatar) Abdulla Koni	1	1	–	–
=	(Qatar) Ali Nasser	1	1	–	–
=	(Morocco) Youssef Chippo	1	1	–	–
=	(Qatar) Nasser Kamil	1	1	–	–
=	(Qatar) Hashim Ali	1	1	–	–
=	(Qatar) Yusuf Abdurisag	1	1	–	–
=	(Morocco) Romain Saïss	1	1	–	–
=	(Algeria) Youcef Atal	1	1	–	–
=	(Algeria) Adam Ounas	1	1	–	–
=	(Brazil) Claudinho	1	1	–	–
=	(Qatar) Abdullah Al-Yazidi	1	1	–	–
=	Own Goals	4	4	–	–
Totals		214	207	0	7

=== Hat-tricks ===
N	Date	Player	Match	Score	Time of goals
1	10 March 2010	Leandro	Al-Ahli Dubai – Al-Sadd	0–5	44', 45+2', 76'
2	17 February 2015	Khalfan Ibrahim	Al-Wahda – Al-Sadd	4–4	66', 90+7', 98'
3	23 October 2023	Baghdad Bounedjah	Al-Sadd – Al-Faisaly	6–0	8', 50', 63'

=== Two goals one match ===
N	Date	Player	Match	Score
1	9 Mar 2005	Hussein Yasser	Al-Sadd – Al-Ahli Dubai	2–0
2	4 May 2006	Carlos Tenorio	Al-Sadd – Al-Shabab	2–3
3	24 Mar 2010	Leandro	Al-Sadd – Mes Kerman	4–1
4	12 Feb 2011	Abdul Kader Keïta	Al-Sadd – Al-Ittihad Aleppo	5–1
5	12 Feb 2011	Leandro	Al-Sadd – Al-Ittihad Aleppo	5–1
6	19 Oct 2011	Mamadou Niang	Suwon Bluewings – Al-Sadd	0–2
7	17 Mar 2015	Khalfan Ibrahim	Al-Sadd – Lokomotiv Tashkent	6–2
8	9 Feb 2016	Hamza Sanhaji	Al-Jazira – Al-Sadd	2–2
9	13 Feb 2018	Baghdad Bounedjah	Al-Wasl – Al-Sadd	1–2
10	20 Feb 2018	Baghdad Bounedjah	Al-Sadd – Persepolis	3–1
11	2 Apr 2018	Baghdad Bounedjah	Al-Sadd – Al-Wasl	2–1
12	7 May 2018	Boualem Khoukhi	Al-Sadd – Al-Ahli Jeddah	2–1
13	14 May 2018	Baghdad Bounedjah	Al-Ahli Jeddah – Al-Sadd	2–2
14	27 Aug 2018	Baghdad Bounedjah	Esteghlal – Al-Sadd	1–3
15	9 Apr 2019	Xavi	Pakhtakor – Al-Sadd	2–2
16	18 Feb 2020	Hassan Al-Haydos	Al-Sadd – Sepahan	3–0
17	18 Sep 2020	Baghdad Bounedjah	Al-Sadd – Al-Ain	4–0

== Non-AFC competitions goals ==
P	Player	Goals
1	(Morocco) Bouchaib El Moubarki	6
2	(Iran) Karim Bagheri	5
3	(Qatar) Ahmed Khalifa	4
4	(Nigeria) John Utaka	3
=	(Qatar) Ishaq Madjarah	3

P	Player	Goals
6	(Qatar) Akram Afif	2
=	(Qatar) Fahad Al Kuwari	2
8	(Qatar) Jafal Rashed Al-Kuwari	1
=	(Qatar) Jasem Mahmood	1
=	(Algeria) Baghdad Bounedjah	1

P	Player	Goals
=	(Qatar) Tarek Salman	1
=	(Ecuador) Gonzalo Plata	1
=	(Brazil) Paulo Otávio	1
=	Own Goals	0

== List of All-time appearances ==
This List of All-time appearances for Al Sadd SC in asian competitions contains football players who have played for Al Sadd SC in asian football competitions and have managed to accrue 25 or more appearances.

Gold Still playing competitive football in Al Sadd SC. (Note: Since 2010 AFC Champions League as of game against Al-Hilal on February 24, 2010, Statistics correct as of game against Kawasaki Frontale on April 27, 2025.)

#	Name	Position	CL1	CWC	FIFA	TOTAL	Date of first cap	Debut against	Date of last cap	Final match against
1	(Qatar) Hassan Al-Haidos	LW / RW / AM	88	–	6	94	24 Feb 2010	Al-Hilal	—	—
2	(Qatar) Abdelkarim Hassan	LB	66	–	3	69	1 Mar 2011	Esteghlal	23 Apr 2022	Nasaf
3	(Qatar) Saad Al Sheeb	GK	59	–	2	61	24 Feb 2010	Al-Hilal	—	—
4	(Qatar) Boualem Khoukhi	CB / LB	56	–	3	59	20 Feb 2018	Persepolis	—	—
5	(Qatar) Ali Assadalla	CM	52	–	2	54	30 Mar 2010	Mes Kerman	—	—
6	(Qatar) Akram Afif	LW / RW	50	–	3	53	13 Feb 2018	Al-Wasl	—	—
7	(Qatar) Pedro Miguel	CB	48	–	3	51	9 Feb 2016	Al-Jazira	—	—
8	(Qatar) Tarek Salman	CB	46	–	3	49	5 Mar 2019	Al-Ahli	—	—
9	(Qatar) Khalfan Ibrahim	AM / LW / RW	38	–	3	41	24 Feb 2010	Al-Hilal	7 Feb 2017	Esteghlal
10	(Algeria) Baghdad Bounedjah	ST	35	–	3	38	7 Feb 2017	Esteghlal	4 Dec 2023	Nasaf
11	(Algeria) Nadir Belhadj	LB	33	–	3	36	1 Mar 2011	Esteghlal	9 Feb 2016	Al-Jazira
=	(Qatar) Mohammed Kasola	CB	34	–	2	36	24 Feb 2010	Al-Hilal	7 Feb 2017	Esteghlal
13	(South Korea) Lee Jung-Soo	CB	32	–	3	35	1 Mar 2011	Esteghlal	26 May 2015	Al-Duhail
14	(Qatar) Salem Al-Hajri	DM	30	–	3	33	13 Feb 2018	Al-Wasl	23 Apr 2022	Nasaf
15	(Qatar) Meshaal Barsham	GK	29	–	2	31	27 Aug 2018	Esteghlal	—	—
16	(Qatar) Mohammed Waad	DM/ CM / AM	29	–	–	29	18 Feb 2020	Sepahan	—	—
17	(South Korea) Jung Woo-young	DM	22	–	3	25	27 Aug 2018	Esteghlal	19 Apr 2022	Al-Wahda
