= 1989 Afro-Asian Club Championship =

ES Sétif	Al-Sadd
(Algeria)	(Qatar)
5	1

First leg
ES Sétif	Al-Sadd
2	0
- Date: 12 January 1990
- Venue: 17 June Stadium, Constantine

Second leg
Al-Sadd	ES Sétif
1	3
- Date: 19 January 1990
- Venue: Jassim bin Hamad Stadium, Doha
- Referee: Jassim Mandi (Bahrain)

The 1989 Afro-Asian Club Championship, was the 4th Afro-Asian Club Championship competition endorsed by the Confederation of African Football (CAF) and Asian Football Confederation (AFC), contested between the winners of the African Champions' Cup and the Asian Club Championship.

The final was contested in two-legged home-and-away format between Algerian team ES Sétif the 1988 African Cup of Champions Clubs winner, and Qatari team Al-Sadd, the 1988–89 Asian Club Championship winner.

The first leg was hosted by ES Sétif at the 17 June Stadium in Constantine on 12 January 1990, while the second leg was hosted by Al-Sadd at Al-Ahly Stadium in Doha on 19 January 1990. ES Sétif won the two legs, with a score on aggregate 5–1.

== Teams ==
Team	Qualification	Previous participation (bold indicates winners)
(Algeria) ES Sétif	1988 African Cup of Champions Clubs winner	None
(Qatar) Al Sadd	1988–89 Asian Club Championship winner	None

== Match details ==
=== First leg ===
12 January 1990
--:-- UTC+1

ES Sétif (Algeria)	2–0	(Qatar) Al Sadd
Bendjaballah 41'; Gharib 70'

17 June Stadium, Constantine

**ES Sétif**	**Al Sadd**

ES Sétif:
GK	**1**	(Algeria) Antar Osmani
DF	**2**	(Algeria) Djamel Nabti
DF	**3**	(Algeria) Kamel Adjas
DF	**4**	(Algeria) Amar Bernaoui
DF	**5**	(Algeria) Abdelhakim Serrar
MF	**6**	(Algeria) Abderrazak Rahmani (c)
MF	**8**	(Algeria) Malik Zorgane	(substituted off) 88'
MF	**10**	(Algeria) Nacer Adjissa
FW	**7**	(Algeria) Abderrahim Bendjaballah
FW	**9**	(Algeria) Mustapha Gharib
FW	**11**	(Algeria) Hamid Rahmouni
Substitutions:
MF	–	(Algeria) Bouzid Raïs	(substituted on) 88'
Manager:
(Algeria) Bouzid Cheniti

Al Sadd:
GK	**1**	(Qatar) Ahmed Al-Matwi
DF	**4**	(Qatar) Yousef Al-Adsani
DF	**8**	(Qatar) Mohammed Al Ammari (c)
DF	**19**	(Qatar) Marzouk Juma
DF	–	(Qatar) Fareed Ismael
MF	**17**	(Qatar) Abdulnasser Al-Obaidly
MF	–	(Qatar) ... Jassim
MF	–	(Qatar) Khalid Salman
FW	–	(Brazil) Vilavio
FW	–	(Qatar) Hassan Joher
FW	–	(Qatar) Mohammed Ghanim
Substitutions:
MF	–	...
Manager:
(Brazil) Cabralzinho

Assistant referees:
... ... (...)
... ... (...)
Fourth official:
... ... (...)

Man of the Match:
... ... (...)

=== Second leg ===
19 January 1990
--:-- UTC+3

(Qatar) Al Sadd	1–3	ES Sétif (Algeria)
Ghasempour 85' (pen.)		Adjissa 24'; Bendjaballah 52', 75'

Jassim bin Hamad Stadium, Doha
Referee: Jassim Mandi (Bahrain)

**Al Sadd**	**ES Sétif**

Al Sadd:
GK	**1**	(Qatar) Ahmed Al-Matwi
DF	**4**	(Qatar) Yousef Al-Adsani
DF	**8**	(Qatar) Mohammed Al Ammari (c)	(red card) 70'
DF	**14**	(Qatar) Fareed Ismael
DF	**19**	(Qatar) Marzouk Juma
MF	**16**	(Qatar) Khalid Salman
MF	**17**	(Qatar) Abdulnasser Al-Obaidly
MF	**18**	(Iran) Ebrahim Ghasempour
FW	**9**	(Qatar) Sharif Omar
FW	**15**	(Qatar) Hassan Joher
FW	**20**	(Qatar) Mohammed Ghanim
Substitutions:
MF	–	...
Manager:
(Brazil) Cabralzinho

ES Sétif:
GK	**1**	(Algeria) Antar Osmani
DF	**2**	(Algeria) Djamel Nabti
DF	**3**	(Algeria) Kamel Adjas
DF	**4**	(Algeria) Amar Bernaoui	(red card) 43'
DF	**5**	(Algeria) Abdelhakim Serrar
MF	**6**	(Algeria) Abderrazak Rahmani (c)
MF	**8**	(Algeria) Bouzid Raïs	(yellow card) 35'
MF	**10**	(Algeria) Nacer Adjissa
FW	**7**	(Algeria) Abderrahim Bendjaballah
FW	**9**	(Algeria) Mustapha Gharib		(substituted off) 53'
FW	**11**	(Algeria) Hamid Rahmouni
Substitutions:
MF	**12**	(Algeria) Fayçal Kessai		(substituted on) 53'
MF	–	(Algeria) Malik Zorgane
Manager:
(Algeria) Bouzid Cheniti

Assistant referees:
Yusuf Al Sharef (Bahrain)
Matar Al Maluth (Bahrain)
Fourth official:
... ... (...)

Man of the Match:
... ... (...)

== Winners ==
1989 Afro-Asian Club
Championship winners
(Algeria)
ES Setif
First title
