= Mokhtar Arribi =

Algerian footballer (born 1986)

Personal information
- Date of birth: 24 February 1924
- Place of birth: Sétif, Algeria
- Date of death: 4 September 1989 (aged 65)
- Place of death: Sétif, Algeria
- Position: Midfielder

Senior career*
Years	Team	Apps	(Gls)
–1944	USM Sétif		
1944–1946	MC Alger		
1946–1951	FC Sète 34		
1951–1952	Cannes	22	(1)
1952–1954	FC Sète 34	52	(0)
1954–1955	Lens	10	(0)
1955–1957	CS Hammam-Lif		
1957–1958	Avignon		

International career
1958–1961	FLN		

Managerial career
- 1955–1957: CS Hammam-Lif
- 1957–1958: Avignon
- 1958–1961: FLN
- 1961–1964: ES Sétif
- 1964–1965: CS Sfaxien
- 1965–1969: ES Sétif
- 1969–1970: Libya
- 1979–1981: ES Sétif
- 1983–1984: ES Sétif
- 1985: Algeria
- 1986–1989: ES Sétif
- * Club domestic league appearances and goals

Mokhtar Arribi (Arabic: مختار عريبي; 24 February 1924 – 4 September 1989) was an Algerian football player and manager.

== Playing career ==
Arribi started his playing career with Algerian side USM Sétif. Following his stint there, he signed for Algerian side MC Alger in 1944. Two years later, he signed for French Ligue 1 side FC Sète 34. Five years later, he signed for French side Cannes, before returning to Ligue 1 side FC Sète 34 in 1952. Subsequently, he spent the last four years of his playing career as player-manager of French Ligue 1 side Lens, then Tunisian side CS Hammam-Lif, and lastly French side Avignon.

== Managerial career ==
In 1961, he was appointed manager of Algerian side ES Sétif. Three years later, he was appointed manager of Tunisian side CS Sfaxien. One year later, he returned as manager of Algerian side ES Sétif, helping the club win the league title and the 1967–68 Algerian Cup. Next, he was appointed manager of the Libya national team in 1969. One decade later, he returned as manager of Algerian side ES Sétif for the third time, helping the club win the 1979–80 Algerian Cup.

After managing the Algeria national team in 1985, he returned as manager of Algerian side ES Sétif for the fifth and final time, helping the club win the league title and the 1988 African Cup of Champions Clubs. Decades after his death in 1989, Algerian newspaper El Khabar wrote in 2016 that he was "considered one of the most prominent sports figures of the century that Algeria has produced" and Algerian newspaper La Nouvelle République wrote in 2022 that he was "one of the legendary figures of Algerian football and the Sétif region".
