= 1994 Afro-Asian Club Championship =

| Zamalek | Thai Farmers Bank |
| (Egypt) | (Thailand) |
| 2 | 2 |
- Thai Farmers Bank won on away goals

First leg
| Zamalek | Thai Farmers Bank |
| 2 | 1 |
- Date: 11 September 1994
- Venue: El Mahalla Stadium, El-Mahalla El-Kubra

Second leg
| Thai Farmers Bank | Zamalek |
| 1 | 0 |
- Date: 21 September 1994
- Venue: Kasikorn Bank Stadium, Bangkok

The 1994 Afro-Asian Club Championship, was the 7th Afro-Asian Club Championship competition endorsed by the Confederation of African Football (CAF) and Asian Football Confederation (AFC), contested between the winners of the African Champions' Cup and the Asian Club Championship.

The final was contested in two-legged home-and-away format between Egyptian team Zamalek, the 1993 African Cup of Champions Clubs winner; and Korean team Pohang Steel, the 1993–94 Asian Club Championship winner. The first leg was hosted by Zamalek at the El Mahalla Stadium in El-Mahalla El-Kubra on 11 September 1994, while the second leg was hosted by Thai Farmers Bank at Kasikorn Bank Stadium in Bangkok on 21 September 1994.

Aggregate was 2–2, therefore Thai Farmers Bank won on away goals.

== Teams ==
| Team | Qualification | Previous participation (bold indicates winners) |
|---|---|---|
| (Egypt) Zamalek | 1993 African Cup of Champions Clubs winner | **1987** |
| (Thailand) Thai Farmers Bank | 1993–94 Asian Club Championship winner | None |

== Match details ==
=== First leg ===
11 September 1994

| Zamalek (Egypt) | 2 – 1 | (Thailand) Thai Farmers Bank |
|---|---|---|
| Otchiri 70'; T. Mansour 75' (pen.) | | ?' |

El Mahalla Stadium, El-Mahalla El-Kubra

=== Second leg ===
21 September 1994

| Thai Farmers Bank (Thailand) | 1 – 0 | (Egypt) Zamalek |
|---|---|---|
| ?' |

Kasikorn Bank Stadium, Bangkok

1994 Afro-Asian Club
Championship winners
(Thailand)
Thai Farmers Bank
First title
