= ES Sétif =

Algerian football club

- Full name: Entente Sportive Sétifienne
- Nicknames: E.S.S; El Kahla (The Black One); L’Entente; Les Aigles Noirs (Black eagles)
- Short name: ESS, SET
- Founded: 1958; 68 years ago, as Entente Sportive de Sétif
- Ground: 8 May 1945 Stadium
- Capacity: 25,000
- Owner: Sonelgaz
- President: Nabil Kebaili
- Manager: Lassaad Chabbi
- League: Ligue 1
- 2025–26: Ligue 1, 11th of 16
Home colours	Away colours	Third colours

Entente Sportive Sétifienne (Arabic: الوفاق الرياضي السطايفي), known as Entente de Sétif, commonly referred to as ES Sétif or ESS for short, is an Algerian professional football club based in Sétif. The club was founded in 1958 and its colours are black and white. Their home stadium, the 8 May 1945 Stadium, has a capacity of 18,000 spectators. The club is currently playing in the Algerian Ligue Professionnelle 1.

ESS is one of the most successful clubs in Algeria, having won the Algerian Ligue Professionnelle 1 eight times and the Algerian Cup a record of eight times. They are also one of only three Algerian clubs to have won the CAF Champions League, winning it twice in 1988 and 2014. They have also won the Arab Champions League twice, in 2007 and 2008, as well as three North African Cups in 2009 and 2010. In 2015, they became the first Algerian club to win the CAF Super Cup since the creation of the competition in 1993.

ES Sétif became CAF Champions League champion by defeating DR Congo's AS Vita Club in the 2014 final; and the reigning CAF Super Cup champions, by beating Egypt's Al Ahly in the 2015 Super Cup and the reigning Algerian Ligue Professionnelle 1 champions.

== History ==
The club was founded in 1958 by Ali Benaouda and Ali Layass as Entente Sportive Sétifienne (ESS), the name was later changed to Entente Pétroliers Sétifienne (EPS) in 1977, and again in 1984 it became known as Entente Plastique Sétifienne (EPS) and was then later changed back to Entente Sportive Sétifienne (ESS).

The first colours of the club were green and white, and following a confrontation with the French Army in a match with FC Gadir on May 8, 1945, the colours changed to black and white as a sign of mourning for the events on that day. The Guessab Stadium was the original name for the club's home.

ES Sétif is one of the prestigious top flight Algerian clubs. The club has won the Algerian Cup 8 times, and is the only Algerian team to have won the Afro-Asia cup, in 1989 in Qatar.

Since its foundation, ES Sétif has had 19 presidents, the first being Ibrahim Dokomi. The current president is Hassan Hammar.

=== African success ===
In 1988, ES Sétif won the African Cup of Champions Clubs by beating Iwuanyanwu Nationale of Nigeria 4–1 on aggregate in the final. After losing the first leg 1–0 in Liberty Stadium, Ibadan, ES Sétif scored 4 goals in the return leg in Constantine to lift the trophy. ES Sétif were playing in the Algerian second division at time and are the only club in Africa to date to have won the African Cup of Champions Clubs while not being in the top flight. By winning the 1988 African Cup of Champions Clubs, ES Sétif qualified for the 1989 Afro-Asian Club Championship, where they faced Al-Sadd of Qatar, winners of the 1988–89 Asian Club Championship. ES Sétif won both legs, 2–0 at home and 3–1 in Doha, to lift the trophy. They are the only Algerian club to have won the competition.

On June 29, 2010, ES Sétif became the first fully professional club in Algeria.

On August 8, 2010, ES Sétif defeated CS Sfaxien of Tunisia 1–0 to win the first-ever edition of the UNAF Super Cup.

=== Crest ===
Former logo

Former logo

Former logo

== Shirt sponsor & kit manufacturer ==
Kit suppliers
Dates	Supplier
2020–2021	(United Kingdom) Umbro
2021–2024	(Saudi Arabia) Offside
2024–	(Italy) Macron

Shirt sponsors
Dates	Sponsor
2007–17	(Algeria) Djezzy GSM
2017–2020	(South Korea) Kia Motors (Algeria) Ooredoo
2020–2021	(United States) ROWE OILS (Algeria) GICA
2021–22	(Algeria) GICA
2023–	(Algeria) Sonelgaz

== Honours ==
Type	Competition	Titles	Winning seasons
Domestic	Ligue 1	8	1968, 1987, 2007, 2009, 2012, 2013, 2015, 2017
Domestic	Algerian Cup	8	1963, 1964, 1967, 1968, 1980, 1989, 2010, 2012
Domestic	Algerian Super Cup	2	2015, 2017
Continental	African Champions League	2	1988, 2014
Continental	African Super Cup	1	2015
Intercontinental	Afro-Asian Cup	1	1989
Regional	Arab Club Champions Cup	2	2007, 2008
Regional	North African Cup of Champions	1	2009
Regional	North African Cup Winners Cup	1	2010
Regional	North African Super Cup	1	2010

== Performance in CAF competitions ==
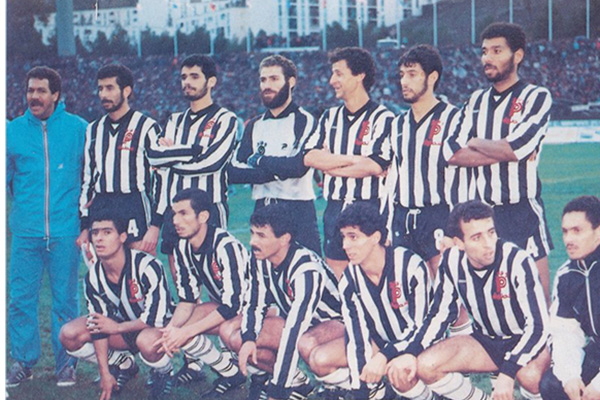
ES Sétif 1989–90 with From Left to Right: Stand Up : Serrar - Boulehdjilet - Osmani - Nabti - Zorgane - Bernaoui. Sitting Bendjabellah - Rahmani - Adjissa - Gharib - Adjas. This team participated in the 1988 African Cup of Champions Clubs.

ES Sétif whose team has regularly taken part in Confederation of African Football (CAF) competitions. Qualification for Algerian clubs is determined by a team's performance in its domestic league and cup competitions, ES Sétif have regularly qualified for the primary African competition, the African Cup, by winning the Ligue Professionnelle 1. ES Sétif have also achieved African qualification via the Algerian Cup and have played in the former African Cup Winners' Cup. The first match was against Kampala City FC and it ended in a 1–0 loss, As for the biggest win was in 1991 against ASC Linguère 7–1, and biggest loss was against Union Douala 5–0 in 1981.

After six years of absence, ES Setif returned to continental competitions, this time in the African Cup of Champions Clubs, for the first time The following year and in the same competition, despite falling to the second division, Les Aigles Noirs managed to achieve the title for the first time against Iwuanyanwu Nationale of Nigeria and after the defeat in the First leg 1–0, they achieved an overwhelming victory in the Second leg 4–0 in a match that took place at Stade du 17 Juin in Constantine, After that, they met with Al Sadd SC in the final of the Afro-Asian Club Championship, and won the title for the first time, which is the only one of its kind in the history of Algerian football. In 1991 ES Sétif participated in the last continental participation in the twentieth century, where it reached the semi-finals, and in the Second round, Malik Zorgane scored the first hat-trick for ES Sétif against SC Gagnoa.

=== Total standings of African Cup participations (1963 to 2022–23) ===
Pos.	Team	Pld	W	D	L	GF	GA	CSC		CCL		CCWC		CAC		CCC	
Pos.	Team	Pld	W	D	L	GF	GA	Pa.	Pld	Pa.	Pld	Pa.	Pld	Pa.	Pld	Pa.	Pld
1	JS Kabylie	213	107	38	68	265	184	2	2	17	122	2	14	4	30	5	45
2	ES Sétif	145	61	37	47	219	162	1	1	12	94	2	12	−	−	5	36
3	USM Alger	145	69	34	42	233	143	1	1	9	80	5	25	1	6	4	34
4	CR Belouizdad	79	32	20	27	96	76	−	−	6	50	2	10	−	−	4	20
5	MC Alger	72	31	13	28	110	92	−	−	7	48	1	4	−	−	4	20
6	MC Oran	48	19	10	19	70	52	−	−	3	20	3	12	2	8	2	8

Pos. = Position; Pld = Matches played; W = Won; D = Drawn; L = Lost; GF = Goals for; GA = Goals against; Pa. = Participation; Pld = Matches played
CSC = CAF Super Cup; CCL = CAF Champions League; CCWC = CAF Cup Winners' Cup;
CAC = CAF Cup; CCC = CAF Confederation Cup

- CAF Champions League: 12 appearances

1987 – Second Round
1988 – Champion
1989 – First Round
2008 – First Round
2010 – Quarter-finals

2011 – Third Round
2013 – Third Round
2014 – Champion
2015 – Group Stage
2016 – Group Stage -Disqualified

2018 – Semi-finals
2022 – Semi-finals

- CAF Confederation Cup: 5 appearances

2009 – Finalist
2011 – Second Round of 8
2012 – First Round

2013 – Group Stage
2021 – Group Stage

- CAF Cup Winners' Cup: 2 appearances

1981 – Quarter-finals
1991 – Semi-finals

- CAF Super Cup: 1 appearance

2015 – Champion

ES Sétif in African football

== Players ==
Algerian teams are limited to four foreign players. The squad list includes only the principal nationality of each player;

=== Current squad ===
As of 31 August 2026. Note: Flags indicate national team as defined under FIFA eligibility rules; some limited exceptions apply. Players may hold more than one non-FIFA nationality.

No.	Pos.	Nation	Player
1	GK	ALG	Alexandre Oukidja
3	DF	ALG	Issam Naim
4	DF	JOR	Hadi Al-Hourani
5	DF	ALG	Aïssa Boudechicha
6	MF	ALG	Idris Messahel
7	FW	ALG	Mohamed Islam Belkhir
8	MF	ALG	Mohamed Hamek
9	FW	ALG	Riad Benayad
10	MF	ALG	Larbi Tabti
11	FW	JOR	Yousef Abu Jalboush
12	DF	ALG	Chemseddine Lakehal
13	DF	GAB	Mick Omfia
15	MF	ALG	Abderrahmane Boungab
16	GK	ALG	Zakaria Saidi (captain)

No.	Pos.	Nation	Player
17	FW	ALG	Mohamed Boukerma
18	FW	ALG	Zakaria Benchaâ
19	DF	ALG	Anis Khemaissia
20	FW	ALG	Merouane Zerrouki
21	DF	ALG	Amine Zenadji
22	MF	ALG	Dalil Hassen Khodja
23	DF	ALG	Slimane Bouteldja
24	FW	ALG	Imadeddine Bouchagoura
25	MF	ALG	Salim Akkal
26	MF	ALG	Mohamed Reda Boumechra
27	DF	ALG	Kamel Hamidi
29	MF	GHA	Salifu Mudasiru
30	GK	ALG	Zakaria Trad

== Personnel ==
=== Current technical staff ===
Position	Staff
Head coach	(Tunisia) Lassaad Chabbi
Assistant coach	(Algeria) Amir Karaoui
Goalkeeping coach	(Algeria) Allaoua Ayadi
Fitness coach	

=== Management ===
Position	Staff
President	Nabil Kebaili
Director General	
Sporting Director	Farès Fellahi
Financial Director	

== Notable players ==
Below are the notable former players who have represented ES Sétif in league and international competition since the club's foundation in 1958. To appear in the section below, a player must have played in at least 100 official matches for the club or represented the national team for which the player is eligible during his stint with ES Sétif or following his departure.

For a complete list of ES Sétif players, see Category:ES Sétif players

Algeria

- (Algeria) Nacer Adjissa
- (Algeria) Laid Belhamel
- (Algeria) Isâad Bourahli
- (Algeria) Faouzi Chaouchi
- (Algeria) Abdelmoumene Djabou
- (Algeria) Lamouri Djediat
- (Algeria) Farès Fellahi
- (Algeria) Abderahmane Hachoud
- (Algeria) Lazhar Hadj Aïssa
- (Algeria) Samir Hadjaoui
- (Algeria) Nabil Hemani

Algeria

- (Algeria) Messaoud Koussim
- (Algeria) Abdelkader Laïfaoui
- (Algeria) Khaled Lemmouchia
- (Algeria) Kheïreddine Madoui
- (Algeria) Hocine Metref
- (Algeria) Antar Osmani
- (Algeria) Slimane Raho
- (Algeria) Abdelhamid Salhi
- (Algeria) Abdelhakim Serrar
- (Algeria) Abdelmalek Ziaya
- (Algeria) Malik Zorgane

Africa

- (Cameroon) Francis Ambané
- (Ivory Coast) Rémi Adiko
- (Ivory Coast) Serey Die

== Managerial history ==
Dates	Name
1961–63	(Algeria) Mokhtar Arribi
1963–64	(Algeria) El Hadi Benmahmoud
1964–65	(Algeria) Mokhtar Arribi
1965	(Algeria) Khelifa Kemicha
1965–67	(Algeria) Abdelhamid Kermali
1967–68	(Algeria) Mokhtar Arribi
1968–71	(Algeria) Abdelhamid Kermali
1971–72	(Algeria) Mokhtar Arribi
1972–73	(Algeria) Mokhtar Arribi (Algeria) El Hadi Benmahmoud
1973–74	(Algeria) El Hadi Benmahmoud
1974–77	(Algeria) Abdelhamid Kermali
1977–78	(Algeria) Benkniouar
1978–79	(Bulgaria) Victor
1979–81	(Algeria) Mokhtar Arribi
1981–83	(Algeria) Abdelhamid Kermali
1983–84	(Algeria) Mokhtar Arribi
1984–85	(Algeria) Abdelhamid Kermali
1985–87	(Algeria) Mokhtar Arribi
1987	(Soviet Union) Bilov
1987–89	(Algeria) Mokhtar Arribi
1989–90	(Algeria) Bouzid Cheniti (Algeria) Hadj Noureddine
1990–91	(Algeria) Bouzid Cheniti
1991–92	(Algeria) Bouzid Ilyes (Algeria) Bouzid Cheniti (Algeria) Boulahdjilet
1992–93	(Algeria) Hadj Noureddine (Palestine) Said Hadj Mansour
1993–94	(Algeria) Abdelhamid Kermali
1994–95	(Algeria) Boulahdjilat (Algeria) Bouzid Cheniti
1995–96	(Algeria) Bouzid Cheniti (Algeria) Abdelhamid Salhi (Algeria) Boulahdjilat
1996–97	(Algeria) Boulahdjilat (Algeria) Abdelkrim Bira
1997–98	(Czech Republic) Bikart (Algeria) Abdelkrim Khalfa
1998–99	(Algeria) Abdelkrim Khalfa (Algeria) Noureddine Saâdi
1999–00	(Algeria) Noureddine Saâdi (Palestine) Said Hadj Mansour
2000–01	(Palestine) Said Hadj Mansour & (Algeria) Abdelkrim Khalfa
2001–02	(Algeria) Safih (Algeria) Noureddine Saâdi
2002–03	(Algeria) Boualem Charef (Palestine) Said Hadj Mansour

Dates	Name
Sept 2, 2004 – Jan 23, 2005	(Algeria) Abdelkrim Bira
Jan 25, 2005 – Jun 1, 2006	(France) Hervé Revelli
Jun 18, 2005– Nov 30, 2005	(Algeria) Hocine Zekri
Dec 12, 2005 – Jan 28, 2007	(Algeria) Rachid Belhout
Feb 1, 2007 – July 5, 2007	(Algeria) Rabah Saâdane
July 11, 2007 – Sept 18, 2007	(Switzerland) Charles Roessli
Sept 20, 2007 - Nov 3, 2007	(Algeria) Noureddine Saâdi
Dec 3, 2007 – June 30, 2008	(France) Bernard Simondi
Sept 1, 2008 – June 30, 2009	(Algeria) Azzedine Aït Djoudi
Oct 8, 2009 – Aug 18, 2010	(Algeria) Noureddine Zekri
Aug 19, 2010 – Dec 31, 2010	(Italy) Giovanni Solinas
Jan 13, 2011 – June 30, 2011	(Italy) Giovanni Dellacasa
Sept 22, 2011 – June 16, 2012	(Switzerland) Alain Geiger
July 1, 2012 – Sept 8, 2013	(France) Hubert Velud
Sept 8, 2013 – Sept 26, 2013	(Algeria) Kheirredine Madoui (interim)
Sept 27, 2013 – Dec 8, 2013	(France) Jean-Christian Lang
Dec 8, 2013 – July 5, 2014	(Algeria) Rabah Saâdane
July 8, 2014–;– December, 2015	(Algeria) Kheirredine Madoui
Dec, 2015 – May 27, 2016	(Switzerland) Alain Geiger
Jun 1, 2016 – Dec 10, 2016	(Algeria) Abdelkader Amrani
Dec 11, 2016 – Dec 31, 2016	(Algeria) Malik Zorgane
Jan, 2017 – Dec 17, 2017	(Algeria) Kheireddine Madoui
Dec 18, 2016 – Dec 31, 2017	(Algeria) Malik Zorgane
Jan, 2018 – Apr, 2018	(Algeria) Abdelhak Benchikha
Apr, 2018 – Jun, 2018	(Algeria) Malik Zorgane
Jun 1, 2018 – Nov 23, 2018	(Morocco) Rachid Taoussi
Nov 25, 2018 – Feb 5, 2019	(Algeria) Noureddine Zekri
Feb 7, 2019 – May 30, 2019	(Algeria) Nabil Neghiz
Jun, 2019 – Oct 17, 2019	(Algeria) Kheireddine Madoui
Oct 26, 2019 – Feb 28, 2022	(Tunisia) Nabil Kouki
Feb 28, 2022 – Apr 17, 2022	(Algeria) Rédha Bendris
Apr 17, 2022 – Jun 17, 2022	(Serbia) Darko Nović
Jul 14, 2022 – Nov 20, 2022	(Egypt) Hossam El Badry
Nov 27, 2022 – Jan 8, 2023	(Algeria) Khaled Lemmouchia (interim)
Jan 8, 2023 – Feb 19, 2023	(Tunisia) Chiheb Ellili
Feb 25, 2023 – Jul 15, 2023	(Algeria) Billel Dziri
Aug 6, 2023 – Sep 12, 2023	(Algeria) Abdelkader Amrani
Sep 13 2023 – Feb 9, 2024	(France) Franck Dumas
Feb 10, 2024 – Jun 14, 2024	(Tunisia) Ammar Souayah
Jul 10, 2024 – Jan 21, 2025	(Algeria) Rédha Bendris
Jan 21, 2025 – Jun 20, 2024	(Tunisia) Nabil Kouki
Jul 14, 2025 – Oct 2, 2025	(Germany) Antoine Hey
Oct 2, 2025 – Oct 30, 2025	(Algeria) Taoufik Rouabah
Nov 18, 2025 – Feb 15, 2026	(Serbia) Milutin Sredojević
Feb 15, 2026 – Jun 6, 2026	(Algeria) Lotfi Amrouche
Jul 1, 2026 –	(Egypt) Hamada Sedki

== List of managers ==
Information correct as of 1 July 2026. Only competitive matches are counted.

Key
*	Caretaker manager

Name	From	To	Matches	Won	Drawn	Lost	Win%
(Algeria) Mokhtar Arribi	1961	1964					
(Algeria) Mokhtar Arribi	1965	1969					
(Algeria) Mokhtar Arribi	1979	1981					
(Algeria) Mokhtar Arribi	1983	1984					
(Algeria) Mokhtar Arribi	1986	1989					
(Algeria) Abdelkrim Bira	2 September 2004	23 January 2005					
(France) Hervé Revelli	25 January 2005	1 June 2006					
(Algeria) Hocine Zekri	18 June 2006	30 November 2006					
(Algeria) Rachid Belhout	12 December 2006	28 January 2007					
(Algeria) Rabah Saâdane	1 February 2007	5 July 2007					
(Switzerland) Charles Roessli	11 July 2007	18 September 2007					
(Algeria) Noureddine Saâdi	20 September 2007	3 November 2007					
(France) Bernard Simondi	3 December 2007	30 June 2008					
(Algeria) Rachid Belhout		22 September 2009					
(Algeria) Ali Mechiche	20 September 2009	8 December 2009					
(Algeria) Noureddine Zekri	8 October 2009	18 August 2010					
(Italy) Giovanni Solinas	19 August 2010	31 December 2010					
(Italy) Giovanni Dellacasa	13 January 2011	30 June 2011					
(Switzerland) Alain Geiger	22 September 2011	16 June 2012	36	22	5	9	61.11
(France) Hubert Velud	4 July 2012	7 September 2013	48	27	9	12	56.25
(Algeria) Kheirredine Madoui ^{*}	8 September 2013	26 September 2013	3	2	0	1	66.67
(France) Jean-Christian Lang	27 September 2013	7 December 2013	9	4	4	1	44.44
(Algeria) Rabah Saâdane	8 December 2013	5 July 2014	27	14	7	6	51.85
(Algeria) Kheirredine Madoui	8 July 2014	7 November 2015	70	26	28	16	37.14
(Switzerland) Alain Geiger	14 November 2015	27 May 2016	27	12	9	6	32.43
(Algeria) Abdelkader Amrani	1 June 2016	14 December 2016	15	7	4	4	46.67
(Algeria) Kheïreddine Madoui	24 December 2016	17 December 2017	35	8	8	4	22.86
(Algeria) Malik Zorgane ^{*}	17 December 2017	29 December 2017	1	1	0	0	100
(Algeria) Abdelhak Benchikha	30 December 2017	25 April 2018	17	6	4	7	35.29
(Algeria) Malik Zorgane ^{*}	25 April 2018	June 2018	5	0	1	4	0
(Morocco) Rachid Taoussi	1 June 2018	23 November 2018	25	11	6	8	44
(Algeria) Noureddine Zekri	24 November 2018	5 February 2019	9	5	1	3	55.56
(Algeria) Nabil Neghiz	7 February 2019	30 May 2019	15	7	3	5	46.67
(Algeria) Kheirredine Madoui	22 July 2019	12 October 2019	7	2	1	4	28.57
(Tunisia) Nabil Kouki	26 October 2019	27 February 2022	89	46	23	20	51.69
(Serbia) Darko Novic	17 April 2022	17 June 2022	14	6	3	5	42.86
(Egypt) Hossam El Badry	13 July 2022	20 November 2022	10	5	3	2	50
(Algeria) Khaled Lemmouchia ^{*}	27 November 2022	8 January 2023	6	2	2	2	33.33
(Tunisia) Chiheb Ellili	8 January 2023	19 February 2023	3	1	0	2	33.33
(Algeria) Billel Dziri	25 February 2023	15 July 2023	12	3	4	5	25
(Algeria) Abdelkader Amrani	6 August 2023	12 September 2023	0	0	0	0	0
(France) Franck Dumas	13 September 2023	9 February 2024	17	9	3	5	52.94
(Tunisia) Ammar Souayah	10 February 2024	9 July 2024	15	6	4	5	40
(Algeria) Rédha Bendris	10 July 2024	21 January 2025	17	7	6	4	41.18
(Tunisia) Nabil Kouki	21 January 2025	20 June 2025	17	7	2	8	41.18
(Germany) Antoine Hey	14 July 2025	2 October 2025	6	1	3	2	16.67
(Algeria) Taoufik Rouabah	2 October 2025	30 October 2025	2	0	1	1	0
(Serbia) Milutin Sredojević	18 November 2025	15 February 2026	12	4	5	3	33.33
(Algeria) Lotfi Amrouche	15 February 2026	6 June 2026	11	6	1	4	54.55
(Egypt) Hamada Sedki	1 July 2026		0	0	0	0	

== Rival clubs ==
- (Algeria) MC Alger (Rivalry)
- (Algeria) CR Belouizdad (Rivalry)
- (Algeria) CS Constantine (Derby)
- (Algeria) MC El Eulma (Derby)
- (Algeria) CA Bordj Bou Arreridj (Derby)
- (Algeria) MO Béjaïa (Rivalry)
