= Malik Zorgane =

Algerian footballer and manager (born 1965)

Personal information
- Full name: Malik Zorgane
- Date of birth: 27 June 1965 (age 61)
- Place of birth: Sétif, Algeria
- Position: Midfielder

Senior career*
Years	Team	Apps	(Gls)
1984–1989	ES Sétif		
1989–1992	US Monastir		
1992–2002	ES Sétif		

International career
1984	Algeria U20	1	(0)
1988–1991	Algeria	9	(2)

Managerial career
- 2010–2011: US Biskra
- * Club domestic league appearances and goals

Malik Zorgane (born 27 June 1965) is an Algerian football manager and a former player. He spent the majority of his playing career with ES Sétif.

Zorgane is a former international and had 9 caps for the Algeria national team. He was a member of the Algeria squad that won the 1991 Afro-Asian Cup of Nations.

== International career ==
Zorgane made his debut for the Algeria national team on 13 November 1988 as a starter in a friendly against Mali. Zorgane scored the first goal in the game in the 15th minute with Algeria going on to win 7–0.

== National team statistics ==
Algeria national team
Year	Apps	Goals
1988	1	1
1989	6	1
1990	0	0
1991	2	0
Total	9	2

=== International goals ===
Scores and results list Algeria's goal tally first.

Goal	Date	Venue	Opponent	Score	Result	Competition
1	13 November 1988	Stade 5 Juillet 1962, Algiers	Mali	1–0	7–0	Friendly
2	10 February 1989	Ta' Qali National Stadium, Ta' Qali, Malta	Malta	1–0	1–0	Friendly

== Honours ==
=== Club ===
- ES Sétif
  - Algerian Championnat National: 1986–87
  - African Cup of Champions Clubs: 1988
  - Afro-Asian Club Championship: 1989

=== Country ===
- Algeria
  - Afro-Asian Cup of Nations: 1991
