= Abdelkrim Bira =

Algerian football manager

Personal information
- Full name: Abdelkrim Bira
- Date of birth: 16 February 1963 (age 63)
- Place of birth: Algeria

Managerial career
- Years: Team
- 1999–2000: Al-Khaleej
- 2008–2009: AS Marsa
- 2012: MC Alger
- 2012–2013: EGS Gafsa
- 2013–2014: USM Bel-Abbès
- 2015: NA Hussein-Dey
- 2016: MC Alger
- 2016–2017: CA Bordj Bou Arreridj
- 2017: USM Alger (director of sports)

Abdelkrim Bira is an Algerian football manager
