= Mohammed Ghanim =

Qatari footballer

Mohammed Ghanim is a retired Qatari football player. He was part of the Al-Sadd team that won the 1988–89 Asian Club Championship. He scored an 85th-minute goal in Al-Saad's 3–2 first leg away defeat to Al-Rasheed. The goal eventually proved crucial; Al-Sadd won the second leg 1–0, and therefore won the tournament on the away goals rule.
