= Jassim Mandi =

Bahraini football referee (born 1944)

Jassim Abdul-Rahman Mandi
- Full name: Jassim Abdul-Rahman Mandi
- Born: December 16, 1944 (age 81); Manama, Bahrain

International
Years	League	Role
1980s–1990	FIFA-listed	Referee

Jassim Abdul-Rahman Mandi (born December 16, 1944, in Manama) is a former football referee from the Asian state of Bahrain. He is known to have officiated the 1988 Summer Olympics in Seoul, South Korea. He has refereed the following international games: (1985) World Cup Youth Final, Moscow (1988) Olympics, Seoul, Korea (1989) World Cup Qualifiers, Italy (1990) World Cup Final, Italy
