= Afro-Asian Club Championship =

- Organiser(s): CAF; AFC
- Founded: 1986
- Abolished: 2000
- Region: Africa; Asia
- Teams: 2
- Related competitions: CAF Champions League; AFC Champions League
- Last champions: (Morocco) Raja Casablanca (1st title)
- Most championships: (Egypt) Zamalek (2 titles)

The Afro-Asian Club Championship, sometimes referred to as the Afro-Asian Cup, was a football competition endorsed by the Confederation of African Football (CAF) and Asian Football Confederation (AFC), contested between the winners of the African Champions' Cup and the Asian Club Championship, the two continents' top club competitions. The championship was modelled on the Intercontinental Cup (organised by Europe's UEFA and South America's CONMEBOL football federations and now replaced by the FIFA Club World Cup) and ran from 1986 to 1998.

Eight of the eleven editions were won by African teams, with three of those from Egypt.

== History ==
The first two competitions held in 1986 and 1987 were contested over a single match; from 1988 until 1998 the competition was held in a two-legged tie format. The last winners were Moroccan side Raja Casablanca, who defeated South Korean side Pohang Steelers in 1998.

The competition was officially discontinued following a CAF decision on 30 July 2000. A rift was created when AFC representatives supported Germany in the vote for hosting the 2006 FIFA World Cup rather than South Africa.

In 2018, CAF President Ahmad Ahmad stated that CAF would consider re-introducing the competition.

A revival of Afro-Asian Club Championship was considered in 2025, when the match was originally proposed to be played at the Lusail Stadium in Qatar, between Al Ahly SC (Egypt) and Al Ain FC (UAE).

== Records and statistics ==
=== Finals ===
Key
| † | Match was won during extra time |
| # | Match was won on away goals |
| * | Match was won on a penalty shoot-out |

List of Afro-Asian Club Championship finals
Single match format
| Year | Winner | | Score | Runner-up | | Venue | Attendance | Ref |
| Year | Nation | Club | Score | Club | Nation | Venue | Attendance | Ref |
|---|---|---|---|---|---|---|---|---|
| 1986 | South Korea | Daewoo Royals | 2–0 | FAR Rabat | Morocco | Prince Faisal bin Fahd Stadium, Riyadh | 20 000 | |
| 1987 | Egypt | Zamalek | 2–0 | Furukawa Electric | Japan | Cairo International Stadium, Cairo | 40 000 | |
Two-legged format
| Season | Home | | Score | Away | | Venue | Attendance | Ref |
| Season | Nation | Club | Score | Club | Nation | Venue | Attendance | Ref |
| 1988 | Japan | Yomiuri | 1–3 | Al Ahly | Egypt | Nishigaoka Stadium, Tokyo | | |
| 1988 | Egypt | Al-Ahly | 1–0 | Yomiuri | Japan | Cairo International Stadium, Cairo | | |
| 1988 | Al Ahly won 4–1 on aggregate | | | | | | | |
| 1989 | Algeria | ES Sétif | 2–0 | Al-Sadd | Qatar | 17 June Stadium, Constantine | | |
| 1989 | Qatar | Al-Sadd | 1–3 | ES Sétif | Algeria | Jassim bin Hamad Stadium, Doha | | |
| 1989 | ES Sétif won 5–1 on aggregate | | | | | | | |
| 1990 | (Morocco) Raja Casablanca and (China) Liaoning FC not held | | | | | | | |
| 1991 | (Algeria) JS Kabylie and (Iran) Esteghlal not held | | | | | | | |
| 1992 | Tunisia | Club Africain | 2–1 | Al-Hilal | Saudi Arabia | Stade El Menzah, Tunis | | |
| 1992 | Saudi Arabia | Al-Hilal | 2–2 | Club Africain | Tunisia | King Fahd International Stadium, Riyadh | | |
| 1992 | Club Africain won 4–3 on aggregate | | | | | | | |
| 1993 | Iran | PAS Tehran | 0–0 | Wydad Casablanca | Morocco | Azadi Stadium, Tehran | | |
| 1993 | Morocco | Wydad Casablanca | 2–0 | PAS Tehran | Iran | Stade Mohammed V, Casablanca | | |
| 1993 | Wydad Casablanrca won 2–0 on aggregate | | | | | | | |
| 1994 | Egypt | Zamalek | 2–1 | Thai Farmers Bank | Thailand | El Mahalla Stadium, El-Mahalla El-Kubra | | |
| 1994 | Thailand | Thai Farmers Bank | 1–0 | Zamalek | Egypt | Kasikorn Bank Stadium, Bangkok | | |
| 1994 | Thai Farmers Bank won on away goals after 2–2 on aggregate | | | | | | | |
| 1995 | Thailand | Thai Farmers Bank | 1–1 | Espérance | Tunisia | Suphanburi | | |
| 1995 | Tunisia | Espérance | 3–0 | Thai Farmers Bank | Thailand | Stade El Menzah, Tunis | | |
| 1995 | Espérance won 4–1 on aggregate | | | | | | | |
| 1996 | South Africa | Orlando Pirates | 0–0 | Cheonan Ilhwa Chunma | South Korea | FNB Stadium, Johannesburg | | |
| 1996 | South Korea | Cheonan Ilhwa Chunma | 5–0 | Orlando Pirates | South Africa | Seoul Olympic Stadium, Seoul | | |
| 1996 | Cheonan Ilhwa Chunma won 5–0 on aggregate | | | | | | | |
| 1997 | South Korea | Pohang Steelers | 2–1 | Zamalek | Egypt | Pohang Steel Yard, Pohang | | |
| 1997 | Egypt | Zamalek | 1–0 | Pohang Steelers | South Korea | Cairo International Stadium, Cairo | | |
| 1997 | Zamalek won on away goals after 2–2 on aggregate | | | | | | | |
| 1998 | South Korea | Pohang Steelers | 2–2 | Raja Casablanca | Morocco | Pohang Steel Yard, Pohang | | |
| 1998 | Morocco | Raja Casablanca | 1–0 | Pohang Steelers | South Korea | Stade Mohamed V, Casablanca | | |
| 1998 | Raja Casablanca won 3–2 on aggregate | | | | | | | |

=== Results by club ===
| Country | Club | Winners | Runners-up | Years won^{[A]} | Years runner-up^{[A]} |
|---|---|---|---|---|---|
| Egypt | Zamalek | 2 | 1 | 1987, 1997 | 1994 |
| Thailand | Thai Farmers Bank | 1 | 1 | 1994 | 1995 |
| South Korea | Busan IPark^{[B]} | 1 | 0 | 1986 | |
| Egypt | Al Ahly | 1 | 0 | 1988 | |
| Algeria | ES Sétif | 1 | 0 | 1989 | |
| Tunisia | Club Africain | 1 | 0 | 1992 | |
| Morocco | Wydad Casablanca | 1 | 0 | 1993 | |
| Tunisia | Espérance | 1 | 0 | 1995 | |
| South Korea | Seongnam FC | 1 | 0 | 1996 | |
| Morocco | Raja Casablanca | 1 | 0 | 1998 | |
| South Korea | Pohang Steelers | 0 | 2 | | 1997, 1998 |
| Morocco | FAR Rabat | 0 | 1 | | 1986 |
| Japan | JEF United^{[C]} | 0 | 1 | | 1987 |
| Japan | Tokyo Verdy^{[D]} | 0 | 1 | | 1988 |
| Qatar | Al-Sadd | 0 | 1 | | 1989 |
| Saudi Arabia | Al-Hilal | 0 | 1 | | 1992 |
| Iran | PAS Tehran | 0 | 1 | | 1993 |
| South Africa | Orlando Pirates | 0 | 1 | | 1996 |

=== Results by country ===
| Nation | Winners | Runners-up |
|---|---|---|
| Egypt | 3 | 1 |
| South Korea | 2 | 2 |
| Morocco | 2 | 1 |
| Tunisia | 2 | 0 |
| Thailand | 1 | 1 |
| Algeria | 1 | 0 |
| Japan | 0 | 2 |
| Iran | 0 | 1 |
| Qatar | 0 | 1 |
| Saudi Arabia | 0 | 1 |
| South Africa | 0 | 1 |

=== Results by continent ===
| Cup | Winners | Runners-up |
|---|---|---|
| African Champions' Cup / CAF Champions League | 8 | 3 |
| Asian Club Championship | 3 | 8 |

=== Winning coaches ===
The following table lists the winning coaches of the Afro-Asian Club Championship.

| Year | Winning Club | Coach |
|---|---|---|
| 1986 | (South Korea) Busan Daewoo Royals | (South Korea) Lee Cha-Man |
| 1987 | (Egypt) Zamalek SC | (Egypt) Essam Baheeg |
| 1988 | (Egypt) Al Ahly | (Germany) Dietrich Weise |
| 1989 | (Algeria) ES Sétif | (Algeria) Bouzid Cheniti |
| 1992 | (Tunisia) Club Africain | (Tunisia) Youssef Zouaoui |
| 1993 | (Morocco) Wydad Casablanca | (Russia) Yuri Sebastianko |
| 1994 | (Thailand) Thai Farmers Bank | (Thailand) Charnwit Polcheewin |
| 1995 | (Tunisia) Esperance Tunis | (Brazil) Roberto di Baldos Amilton |
| 1996 | (South Korea) Ilhwa Chunma | (South Korea) Lee Jang-soo |
| 1997 | (Egypt) Zamalek SC | (Netherlands) Ruud Krol |
| 1998 | (Morocco) Raja Casablanca | (Argentina) Oscar Fullone |

== See also ==
- FIFA Intercontinental Cup
- Afro-Asian Cup of Nations
- CAF Champions League
- AFC Champions League Elite
- Copa Interamericana
- Intercontinental Cup (1960–2004)
- FIFA Club World Cup

== Notes ==
A. ^{a} ^{b} ^{c} ^{d} ^{e} For clarity, years given in the winners' list do not necessarily correspond to the years when matches were actually played. The finals were always held between the African Champions' Cup winners from the earlier calendar year (given year minus 1) and the Asian Champions' Cup winners who won the title in the previous season (given year minus 1/given year), e.g. the inaugural 1986 final was held between 1985 African Champions' Cup winners FAR Rabat and the 1985–86 Asian Club Championship winners Daewoo Royals. However, FIFA designates at least some of these titles according to the year when the final matches were held.
B. Korean club Busan IPark were known as Daewoo Royals until 2000.
C. Japanese club JEF United Ichihara Chiba were founded as Furukawa Electric Soccer Club until 1991.
D. Japanese club Tokyo Verdy were called Yomiuri FC from their foundation in 1969 until 1993.
