= 1988 African Cup of Champions Clubs =

Tournament details
- Dates: 1988
- Teams: 37 (from 37 associations)

Final positions
- Champions: (Algeria) Entente de Sétif (1st title)
- Runners-up: (Nigeria) Iwuanyanwu Nationale

Tournament statistics
- Matches played: 70
- Goals scored: 184 (2.63 per match)

The African Cup of Champions Clubs 1988 was the 24th edition of the annual international club football competition held in the CAF region (Africa), the African Cup of Champions Clubs. It determined that year's club champion of association football in Africa. The tournament was played by 37 teams and was used a playoff scheme with home and away matches.

Entente de Sétif (Note: ES Sétif changed the name to EP Sétif from 1977 to 1987 and to Entente de Sétif from 1987-88 to 1988-89 seasons, so the club participated under the first name until the quarter-final and under the second name in the semi-final and the final.) from Algeria won that final against Iwuanyanwu Nationale from Nigeria, to become CAF club champion for the first time.

== Preliminary round ==
Team 1	Agg.	Team 2	1st leg	2nd leg
CD Elá Nguema (Equatorial Guinea)	0–5	(Republic of the Congo) Étoile du Congo	0–1	0–4
Manzini Wanderers (Eswatini)	6–1	(Botswana) Township Rollers	2–0	4–1
Panthères Noires (Rwanda)	2–3	(Somalia) Wagad FC	2–2	0–1
LDF (Lesotho)	2–3	(Mauritius) Sunrise Flacq United	2–0	0–3
Sierra Fisheries (Sierra Leone)	0–1	(Mauritania) AS Police	0–1	0–0

== First round ==
Team 1	Agg.	Team 2	1st leg	2nd leg
AS Kaloum Star (Guinea)	1–5	(Ivory Coast) Africa Sports	0–2	1–3
Asante Kotoko (Ghana)	2–2 (2–4 p)	(Gabon) FC 105 Libreville	2–0	0–2
Doumbé FC (Togo)	0–2	(Cameroon) Tonnerre Yaoundé	0–1	0–1
Étoile du Congo (Republic of the Congo)	0–2	(Burundi) AS Inter Star	0–0	0–2
Étoile du Sahel (Tunisia)	w/o^{1}	(Libya) Al-Nasr	—	—
Invincible Eleven (Liberia)	0–1	(Morocco) FAR Rabat	0–1	0–0
Iwuanyanwu Nationale (Nigeria)	3–0	(Benin) Requins de l'Atlantique	2–0	1–0
Manzini Wanderers (Eswatini)	2–5	(Uganda) SC Villa	1–4	1–1
Matchedje (Mozambique)	4–3	(Madagascar) Jos Nosy-Bé	3–1	1–2
Petro Atlético (Angola)	3–1	(Zaire) TP Mazembe	2–1	1–0
AS Police (Mauritania)	2–2 (10–9 p)	(Senegal) SEIB Diourbel	2–0	0–2
Shabana FC (Kenya)	2–4	(Zambia) Kabwe Warriors	1–0	1–4
Stade Malien (Mali)	1–5	(Algeria) Entente de Sétif	1–1	0–4
Sunrise Flacq United (Mauritius)	4–3	(Zimbabwe) Black Rhinos	2–1	2–2
Wagad FC (Somalia)	1–7	(Sudan) Al-Hilal	1–1	0–6
Young Africans (Tanzania)	0–4	(Egypt) Al Ahly	0–0	0–4

^{1} Al-Nasr withdrew.

== Second round ==
Team 1	Agg.	Team 2	1st leg	2nd leg
Africa Sports (Ivory Coast)	4–2	(Angola) Petro Atlético	3–0	1–2
Étoile du Sahel (Tunisia)	2–3	(Algeria) Entente de Sétif	2–1	0–2
FAR Rabat (Morocco)	6–2	(Mauritania) AS Police	5–0	1–2
FC 105 Libreville (Gabon)	3–2	(Burundi) AS Inter Star	2–1	1–1
Iwuanyanwu Nationale (Nigeria)	4–3	(Cameroon) Tonnerre Yaoundé	2–0	2–3
Kabwe Warriors (Zambia)	1–3	(Sudan) Al-Hilal	0–0	1–3
SC Villa (Uganda)	3–6	(Egypt) Al Ahly	2–3	1–3
Sunrise Flacq United (Mauritius)	3–5	(Mozambique) Matchedje	2–0	1–5

== Quarter-finals ==
Team 1	Agg.	Team 2	1st leg	2nd leg
Al Ahly (Egypt)	2–1	(Mozambique) Matchedje	2–0	0–1
Al-Hilal (Sudan)	1–3	(Morocco) FAR Rabat	1–0	0–3
FC 105 Libreville (Gabon)	3–4	(Algeria) Entente de Sétif	3–1	0–3
Iwuanyanwu Nationale (Nigeria)	3–2	(Ivory Coast) Africa Sports	2–0	1–2

== Semi-finals ==
Team 1	Agg.	Team 2	1st leg	2nd leg
Entente de Sétif (Algeria)	2–2 (4–2 p)	(Egypt) Al Ahly	2–0	0–2
Iwuanyanwu Nationale (Nigeria)	5–5 (5–3 p)	(Morocco) FAR Rabat	4–1	1–4

== Final ==
26 November 1988
--:-- UTC+1

Iwuanyanwu Nationale (Nigeria)	1–0	(Algeria) Entente de Sétif
Ozogula 29'

Liberty Stadium, Ibadan
Attendance: 25,000
Referee: Idrissa Traoré (Mali)
9 December 1988
--:-- UTC+1

Entente de Sétif (Algeria)	4–0	(Nigeria) Iwuanyanwu Nationale
Zorgane 50'; Rahmani 52'; Uwe 85' (o.g.); Bendjaballah 87'

Stade 17 Juin 1962, Constantine
Attendance: 55,000
Referee: Badara Sène (Senegal)

== Champion ==
1988 African Cup of Champions Clubs winners
(Algeria)
Entente de Sétif
First title

== Top scorers ==
The top scorers from the 1988 African Cup of Champions Clubs are as follows:

Rank	Name	Team	Goals
1	(Morocco) Abdeslam Laghrissi	(Morocco) FAR Rabat	7
2	(Egypt) Ayman Shawky	(Egypt) Al Ahly	5
3	(Algeria) Abderrazak Rahmani	(Algeria) Entente de Sétif	4
2	(Egypt) Rabie Yassin	(Egypt) Al Ahly	3
2	(Morocco) Abderrazak Khairi	(Morocco) FAR Rabat	3
6	(Algeria) Nacer Adjissa	(Algeria) Entente de Sétif	2
6	(Algeria) Mustapha Gharib	(Algeria) Entente de Sétif	2
6	(Egypt) Taher Abouzeid	(Egypt) Al Ahly	2
6	(Morocco) Hammou Fadili	(Morocco) FAR Rabat	2
