= 2007–08 ES Sétif season =

ES Sétif
2007–08 season
- President: Abdelhakim Serrar
- Head Coach: Bernard Simondi
- Stadium: Stade 8 Mai 1945
- Division 1: 3rd
- Algerian Cup: Round of 64
- Super Cup: Runners–up
- CAF Champions League: First round
- Arab Champions League: Winner
- Top goalscorer: League: Farid Touil (7); All: Farid Touil (14)

The 2007–08 season was ES Sétif's 38th season in the Algerian top flight. They competed in National 1, the Algerian Cup, the Super Cup, the CAF Champions League and the Arab Champions League.

== Review ==
On 1 November 2007, ES Sétif took part in the second edition of the Super Cup. As Algerian champions, they faced MC Alger, winners of the Algerian Cup. The match was played at the Stade 5 Juillet 1962 in Algiers. ES Sétif entered the final on a positive run after drawing with Al-Wahda Mecca in Saudi Arabia. However, several players were unavailable, including Rémi Adiko, goalkeeper Samir Hadjaoui, Amirat and Lazhar Hadj Aïssa. Despite these absences, the Sétif club aimed to win the trophy. ES Sétif eventually lost 4–0 to MC Alger. The defeat marked the club’s first loss in a final.

In the first leg of the 2007–08 Arab Champions League final, ES Sétif defeated Wydad Casablanca 1–0 in Casablanca, putting themselves in a strong position ahead of the return leg. Wydad dominated much of the first half, but the Algerian side defended well and relied on counterattacks. ES Sétif created several opportunities, with Adiko and Benchaira both coming close to scoring. The decisive goal came in the final quarter of the match. Substitute Farid Touil headed the ball into the net following a cross from Raho, who had been set up by Hadj Aïssa. The goal gave ES Sétif a valuable 1–0 away victory.

== Squad list ==
Players and squad numbers last updated on 1 September 2007.
Note: Flags indicate national team as has been defined under FIFA eligibility rules. Players may hold more than one non-FIFA nationality.

No.	Nat.	Position	Name	Date of birth (age)	Signed from
Goalkeepers
19	(Algeria)	GK	Samir Hadjaoui	16 February 1979 (aged 28)	(Algeria) CR Belouizdad
	(Algeria)	GK	Mohamed Seghir Ferradji	22 August 1975 (aged 32)	(Algeria)
1	(Algeria)	GK	Abderaouf Natèche	16 October 1982 (aged 24)	(Algeria) USM El Harrach
Defenders
5	(Algeria)	CB	Adel Maïza	18 March 1983 (aged 24)	(Algeria) CS Constantine
4	(Algeria)	CB / RB	Abdelkader Laifaoui	9 July 1981 (aged 26)	(Algeria) CR Belouizdad
25	(Algeria)	CB	Hamza Zeddam	8 April 1984 (aged 23)	(Algeria) CS Constantine
28	(Algeria)	CB	Mohamed Mehdi Defnoun	6 February 1979 (aged 28)	(Algeria)
17	(Algeria)	RB	Slimane Raho	20 October 1975 (aged 31)	(Algeria) JS Kabylie
	(Algeria)	RB	Farès Boudemagh	8 June 1980 (aged 27)	(Algeria) OMR El Annasser
27	(Algeria)	LB	Mohamed Yekhlef	12 July 1981 (aged 26)	(Algeria) WA Tlemcen
3	(Algeria)	LB	Riad Benchadi	7 November 1978 (aged 28)	(Algeria) CA Bordj Bou Arreridj
Midfielders
18	(Algeria)	DM	Ali Moumen	31 March 1977 (aged 30)	(Algeria) MC Oran
8	(Algeria)	DM	Khaled Lemmouchia	6 December 1981 (aged 25)	(France) AS Lyon Duchère
13	(Algeria)	DM	Mourad Delhoum	10 February 1985 (aged 22)	(Algeria) Amal Bou Saâda
	(Ivory Coast)	DM	Alex Somian	9 June 1986 (aged 21)	(Ivory Coast) JC d'Abidjan
6	(Algeria)	DM	Azzedine Benchaira	2 November 1978 (aged 28)	(Algeria) US Biskra
6	(Ivory Coast)	DM / CM	Serey Dié	7 November 1984 (aged 22)	(Tunisia) EO Goulette Kram
	(Algeria)		Abdelmoumene Bella	8 May 1988 (aged 19)	(Algeria) ?
14	(Algeria)	AM / RW	Lamouri Djediat	20 January 1981 (aged 26)	(Algeria) Paradou AC
	(Algeria)	AM / RW	Abdelmoumene Djabou	31 January 1987 (aged 20)	(Algeria) Youth system
10	(Algeria)	AM	Lazhar Hadj Aïssa	23 March 1984 (aged 23)	(Algeria) MSP Batna
21	(Ivory Coast)	AM	Rémi Adiko	15 January 1982 (aged 25)	(Republic of the Congo) Diables Noirs
Forwards
	(Algeria)	ST	Mohamed Badache	15 October 1976 (aged 30)	(Algeria) MC Alger
9	(Algeria)	CF	Abdelmalek Ziaya	23 January 1984 (aged 23)	(Algeria) ES Guelma
15	(Algeria)		Farid Touil	10 December 1974 (aged 32)	(Algeria) USM Blida
12	(Algeria)		Fares Mecheri	9 July 1979 (aged 28)	(France) AS Lyon-Duchère
11	(Algeria)		Arezki Hamza Dambri	25 April 1988 (aged 19)	(Algeria) Youth system
	(Algeria)		Sofiane Bencharif	8 November 1986 (aged 20)	(Algeria) ?

== Competitions ==
=== Overview ===
Competition	Record								Started round	Final position / round	First match	Last match
Competition	G	W	D	L	GF	GA	GD	Win %	Started round	Final position / round	First match	Last match
Division 1	30	12	8	10	32	27	+5	40.00	—N/a	3rd	23 August 2007	26 May 2008
Algerian Cup	1	0	0	1	0	1	−1	0.00	Round of 64		11 January 2008	
Super Cup	1	0	0	1	0	4	−4	0.00	Final	Runners–up	1 November 2007	
CAF Champions League	4	3	0	1	9	3	+6	75.00	Preliminary round	First round	15 February 2008	6 April 2008
Arab Champions League	14	8	4	2	22	9	+13	57.14	Round 32	Winner	16 September 2007	22 May 2008
Total	50	23	12	15	63	44	+19	46.00				

Updated to match played 3 June 2019
Source: Competitions

=== Division 1 ===
==== League table ====
Pos	Team	Pld	W	D	L	GF	GA	GD	Pts	Qualification or relegation
1	JS Kabylie	30	18	5	7	46	24	+22	59	Qualification for Champions League
2	ASO Chlef	30	13	10	7	29	22	+7	49	Qualification for Champions League
3	ES Sétif	30	12	8	10	32	27	+5	43 (Note: ES Sétif were deducted 1 point.)	Qualification for Confederation Cup
4	USM Alger	30	12	6	12	32	27	+5	42	Qualification for Arab Champions League
5	USM Annaba	30	12	6	12	36	37	−1	42	Qualification for Arab Champions League

Source: DZFoot
Rules for classification: 1) points; 2) head-to-head points; 3) head-to-head goal difference; 4) goal difference; 5) total goals; 6) fairplay ranking; 7) playoff.

==== Results summary ====
Overall								Home						Away					
Pld	W	D	L	GF	GA	GD	Pts	W	D	L	GF	GA	GD	W	D	L	GF	GA	GD
30	12	8	10	32	27	+5	44	7	4	4	19	13	+6	5	4	6	13	14	−1

Last updated: 22 April 2018.
Source: Competitive matches

==== Results by round ====
Round	1	2	3	4	5	6	7	8	9	10	11	12	13	14	15	16	17	18	19	20	21	22	23	24	25	26	27	28	29	30
Ground	H	A	H	A	H	H	A	H	A	H	A	H	A	H	A	A	H	A	H	A	A	H	A	H	A	H	A	H	A	H
Result	W	W	W	L	W	D	W	L	D	W	L	W	D	D	W	W	W	D	D	L	L	W	L	D	L	L	W	L	D	L
Position	6	3	3	3	2	4	2	3	3	3	6	2	3	3	2	2	2	2	2	2	2	2	2	3	5	5	4	4	3	3

Source: Competitive matches
A = Away; H = Home; W = Win; D = Draw; L = Loss

==== Matches ====
Win Draw Loss

23 August 2007 Round 1	ES Sétif	3–1	MC Oran	Sétif
17:00	Touil 1'; Adiko 27'; Ziaya 86'		Berradja 19'	Stadium: Stade 8 Mai 1945; Referee: Mohamed Bichari

30 August 2007 Round 2	WA Tlemcen	0–1	ES Sétif	Tlemcen
17:00			Djabou 28'	Stadium: Stade des 3 Frères; Referee: Mokhtar Amalou

6 September 2007 Round 3	ES Sétif	1–0	MC Alger	Sétif
20:00	Touil 45+2'			Stadium: Stade 8 Mai 1945; Referee: Houari Belkacem

10 September 2007 Round 4	USM Blida	2–0	ES Sétif	Blida
17:00	Chahloul 4'; Endzanga 8'			Stadium: Stade Mustapha Tchaker; Referee: Touati Djaballah

21 September 2007 Round 5	ES Sétif	3–2	ASO Chlef	Sétif
23:00	Touil 51', 85'; Benchadi 61'		Boukhari 16'; Talla 76'	Stadium: Stade 8 Mai 1945; Referee: Said Benamara

5 October 2007 Round 6	ES Sétif	0–0	CA Bordj Bou Arreridj	Sétif
23:00				Stadium: Stade 8 Mai 1945; Referee: Okba Benbaka

19 November 2007 Round 7	NA Hussein Dey	0–2	ES Sétif	Algiers
14:30			Djediat 52'; Touil 85'	Stadium: Stade Frères Zioui; Referee: Mohamed Fettouha

2 December 2007 Round 8	ES Sétif	0–2	AS Khroub	Sétif
18:00			Gouaich 45+2'; Hammami 87'	Stadium: Stade 8 Mai 1945; Referee: Abdelhamid Aouiti

17 December 2007 Round 9	CR Belouizdad	0–0	ES Sétif	Algiers
14:30				Stadium: Stade 20 Août 1955; Referee: Mohamed Benouza

9 November 2007 Round 10	ES Sétif	2–1	USM Alger	Sétif
19:00	Ziaya 21', 59'		Bourahli 12'	Stadium: Stade 8 Mai 1945; Referee: Touati Djaballah

15 November 2007 Round 11	JS Kabylie	1–0	ES Sétif	Tizi Ouzou
14:30	Derrag 52'			Stadium: Stade 1er Novembre 1954; Referee: Mohamed Bichari

23 November 2007 Round 12	ES Sétif	4–0	USM Annaba	Sétif
19:00	Maïza 27' (pen.); Djediat 56'; Touil 71'; Delhoum 88'			Stadium: Stade 8 Mai 1945; Referee: Mohamed Khelifi

6 December 2007 Round 13	MC Saïda	2–2	ES Sétif	Saïda
14:30	Hamidi 85'; Seguer 90+3'		Touil 29'; Djediat 81'	Stadium: Stade 13 Avril 1958; Referee: Sofiane Bousseter

31 December 2007 Round 14	ES Sétif	0–0	JSM Béjaïa	Sétif
18:00				Stadium: Stade 8 Mai 1945; Referee: Abdallah Benaouda

4 January 2008 Round 15	OMR El Annasser	1–2	ES Sétif	Algiers
15:00	Abdi 78'		Deghmani 37' (o.g.); Ziaya 72'	Stadium: Stade 20 Août 1955; Referee: Houari Belkacem

14 January 2008 Round 16	MC Oran	0–2	ES Sétif	Oran
14:30			Djediat 42', 57'	Stadium: Stade Ahmed Zabana; Referee: Mokhtar Amalou

18 January 2008 Round 17	ES Sétif	2–1	WA Tlemcen	Sétif
18:00	Serey Dié 58'; Mecheri 87'		Zeddam 90' (o.g.)	Stadium: Stade 8 Mai 1945

25 January 2008 Round 18	MC Alger	1–1	ES Sétif	Algiers
18:00	Belghomari 72'		Hadj Aïssa 55'	Stadium: Stade 5 Juillet 1962; Referee: Said Benamara

31 January 2008 Round 19	ES Sétif	0–0	USM Blida	Sétif
18:00				Stadium: Stade 8 Mai 1945; Referee: Houari Belkacem

8 February 2008 Round 20	ASO Chlef	1–0	ES Sétif	Chlef
15:00	Soudani 61'			Stadium: Stade Mohamed Boumezrag; Referee: Abdelkader Abed

25 February 2008 Round 21	CA Bordj Bou Arreridj	2–0	ES Sétif	Bordj Bou Arréridj
14:30	Houari 8'; Mehdaoui 65'			Stadium: Stade 20 Août 1955; Referee: Mohamed Khelifi

9 March 2008 Round 22	ES Sétif	3–0	NA Hussein Dey	Sétif
18:00	Adiko 7'; Maïza 66' (pen.); Mecheri 86'			Stadium: Stade 8 Mai 1945; Referee: Abdelkader Abed

12 March 2008 Round 23	AS Khroub	1–0	ES Sétif	El Khroub
14:30	Gouaich 45'			Stadium: Stade Abed Hamdani; Referee: Mohamed Bichari

27 March 2008 Round 24	ES Sétif	1–1	CR Belouizdad	Sétif
13:00	Adiko 90'		Abbou 52'	Stadium: Stade 8 Mai 1945; Referee: Houari Belkacem

31 March 2008 Round 25	USM Alger	1–0	ES Sétif	Bologhine
15:30	Achiou 80'			Stadium: Omar Hamadi Stadium; Referee: Abdelkader Abed

18 April 2008 Round 26	ES Sétif	0–3	JS Kabylie	Sétif
19:00				Stadium: Stade 8 Mai 1945

21 April 2008 Round 27	USM Annaba	0–1	ES Sétif	Annaba
15:30			Ziaya 70'	Stadium: Stade 19 Mai 1956; Referee: Mehdi Abid Charef

12 May 2008 Round 28	ES Sétif	0–1	MC Saïda	Sétif
15:30			Seddik 41'	Stadium: Stade 8 Mai 1945; Referee: Mohamed Haddada

15 May 2008 Round 29	JSM Béjaïa	2–2	ES Sétif	Béjaïa
15:30	Megateli 54'; Boukessassa 90+2'		Mecheri 21', 42'	Stadium: Stade de l'Unité Maghrébine; Referee: Mohamed Fettouha

26 May 2008 Round 30	ES Sétif	0–1	OMR El Annasser	Sétif
15:30			Alliche 65'	Stadium: Stade 8 Mai 1945; Attendance: 0 (close doors); Referee: Touati Djaballah

== Algerian Cup ==
11 January 2008 Round of 64	ES Sétif	0–1	CA Bordj Bou Arreridj	Bouïra
15:00				Stadium: Stade Rabah Bitat

== Algerian Super Cup ==
1 November 2007	ES Sétif	0–4	MC Alger	Algiers
14:30		Report	6', 58' Younès; 51' Belghomari; 54' Badji	Stadium: Stade 5 Juillet 1962; Referee: Aouaz Trabelsi (Tunisia)

== CAF Champions League ==
=== Preliminary round ===
15 February 2008 First leg	ASC SNIM (Mauritania)	1–5	(Algeria) ES Setif	Nouadhibou
			Touil 8'; Djediat 16'; Serey Dié 84' (pen.); Ziaya 86'; Adiko 90'	Referee: Georges Faye (Cape Verde)

1 March 2008 Second leg	ES Setif (Algeria)	2–0	(Mauritania) ASC SNIM	Sétif
	Delhoum 6'; Mecheri 22'			Stadium: Stade 8 Mai 1945; Referee: Mohamed Ali (Egypt)

=== First round ===
22 March 2008 First leg	Olympique Khouribga (Morocco)	2–0	(Algeria) ES Sétif	Khouribga
	Alaoui 45'; Amzil 90'			Stadium: Stade des Phosphates; Referee: Aldobo Serge (Burkina Faso)

6 April 2008 Second leg	ES Sétif (Algeria)	2–0 (0–3 p)	(Morocco) Olympique Khouribga	Sétif
	Ziaya 10'; Hadj Aïssa 82'			Stadium: Stade 8 Mai 1945; Referee: Victor Rocha Lima (Cape Verde)
	Penalties
	Maïza (penalty missed); Serey Dié (penalty missed); Benchadi (penalty missed)		(penalty missed) Souari; (penalty scored) Alaoui; (penalty scored) Amzil; (penalty scored) ?

== Arab Champions League ==
=== Round of 32 ===
16 September 2007 first leg	ASC Mauritel (Mauritania)	1–1	(Algeria) ES Sétif	Nouakchott
21:30 UTC+0	Boubekeur Ould Djarou 56'	Report	Djediat 73'	Stadium: Stade Olympique
Note: Lineup for ES Sétif - Hadjaoui - Raho, Benchadi, Laifaoui, Maiza - Defnoun (Zeddam 80'), Benchaira (Djediat 63'), Lemmouchia, Hadj Aissa, Alex Somian, Ziaya (Djabou 59')

1 October 2007 Second leg	ES Sétif (Algeria)	3–0	(Mauritania) ASC Mauritel	Sétif
22:00 UTC+1	Touil 11', 65'; Djabou 62'	Report		Stadium: Stade 8 Mai 1945; Referee: Djamel Ambia (Libya)
Note: Lineup for ES Sétif - Hadjaoui - Raho, Zeddam, Benchadi, Yekhlef - Adiko (Mecheri 66'), Moumen, Lemmouchia (Delhoum 36'), Djediat - Djabou, Touil (Defnoun 76').

=== Round of 16 ===
23 October 2007 first leg	Al-Wahda Mecca (Saudi Arabia)	1–1	(Algeria) ES Sétif	Mecca
	Ahmed Moussa 76'	Report	Messaoui 31' (o.g.)	Stadium: King Abdul Aziz Stadium; Referee: Salem Mahmoud Fayçal (Jordan)
Note: Lineup for ES Sétif - Hadjaoui - Raho, Laïfaoui, Maïza, Benchadi, Yekhlef - Adiko, Moumen (Delhoum 46'), Lemmouchia, Djediat (Djabou 76') - Ziaya (Touil 62').

5 November 2007 Second leg	ES Sétif (Algeria)	3–1	(Saudi Arabia) Al-Wahda Mecca	Sétif
	Djediat 18'; Adiko 41'; Ziaya 85'	Report	El Kawakibi 87'	Stadium: Stade 8 Mai 1945; Referee: Kacem Benacer (Tunisia)
Note: Lineup for ES Sétif - Hadjaoui - Raho, Maïza, Benchadi, Yekhlef - Delhoum (Moumen 80'), Lemmouchia, Djediat - Adiko (Laïfaoui 63'), Touil (Ziaya 46'), Djabou.

=== Group stage ===
==== Group A ====
Team	Pld	W	D	L	GF	GA	GD	Pts
(Algeria) ES Sétif	6	3	2	1	10	4	+6	11
(Jordan) Al-Faisaly	6	2	3	1	9	7	+2	9
(Morocco) Raja Casablanca	6	1	4	1	3	4	−1	7
(Syria) Al-Majd	6	0	3	3	5	12	−7	3

28 November 2007 Round 1	ES Sétif (Algeria)	1–1	(Syria) Al-Majd	Sétif
	Djediat 51'	Report	Rafe 37'	Stadium: Stade 8 Mai 1945; Referee: Djamel Ambia (Libya)
Note: Lineup for ES Sétif - Hadjaoui - Raho, Maïza, Benchadi, Yekhlef - Adiko, Lemmouchia, Benchaïra, Djediat - Ziaya, Touil (Djabou 71').

12 December 2007 Round 2	ES Sétif (Algeria)	2–0	(Morocco) Raja Casablanca	Sétif
	Maïza 31'; Touil 88'	Report		Stadium: Stade 8 Mai 1945; Referee: Talaât Najm (Lebanon)
Note: Lineup for ES Sétif - Hadjaoui - Delhoum, Laïfaoui, Maiza, Benchadi, Benchaira (Alex 87') - Lemouchia, Moumen, Djediat - Adiko (Touil 72'), Dembri (Ziaya 69').

26 December 2007 Round 3	Al-Faisaly (Jordan)	1–1	(Algeria) ES Sétif	Amman
	Lafi 39'	Report	Touil 63'	Stadium: Amman International Stadium; Referee: Abdallah El Hilali
Note: Lineup for ES Sétif - Hadjaoui - Raho, Laïfaoui, Maïza, Benchaïra - Lemmouchia, Alex (Delhoum 57'), Moumen - Djediat - Dembri (Adiko 57'), Touil (Ziaya 88').

20 February 2008 Round 4	Raja Casablanca (Morocco)	1–0	(Algeria) ES Sétif	Casablanca
	Senghor 60'	Report		Stadium: Stade Mohamed V Referee: A. El-Harbi (Saudi Arabia)
Note: Lineup for ES Sétif - Hadjaoui - Raho, Laïfaoui, Zeddam, Benchadi -Moumen, Lemmouchia - Serey, Djediat, Hadj Aissa (Ziaya 66') - Adiko (Benchaïra 83').

5 March 2008 Round 5	ES Sétif (Algeria)	2–1	(Jordan) Al-Faisaly	Sétif
	Touil 89'; Adiko 90+5'	Report	Lafi 85'	Stadium: Stade 8 Mai 1945; Referee: Talaât Najm (Lebanon)
Note: Lineup for ES Sétif - Hadjaoui - Delhoum, Laïfaoui, Maïza, Benchadi - Adiko, Moumen (Benchaïra 53'), Lemmouchia, Serey (Touil 68') - Ziaya, Mecheri (Hadj Aïssa 50').

18 March 2008 Round 6	Al-Majd (Syria)	0–4	(Algeria) ES Sétif	Damascus
		Report	Adiko 20'; Laïfaoui 45'; Djediat 66', 77'	Stadium: Tishreen Stadium; Referee: Attallah Al kourdi (Kuwait)
Note: Lineup for ES Sétif - Ferradji - Raho, Laïfaoui, Maïza (Zeddam 77'), Alex - Delhoum, Lemmouchia, Djediat - Adiko (Touil 69'), Ziaya (Mecheri 72'), Serey.

=== Semi-finals ===
15 April 2008 first leg	Tala'ea El-Gaish (Egypt)	2–1	(Algeria) ES Sétif	Cairo
	Abdelali 25', 53'	Report	Mecheri 80'	Stadium: Cairo Military Academy Stadium; Referee: Ali Ahmed (United Arab Emirates)
Note: Lineup for ES Sétif - Ferradji - Raho, Laïfaoui, Maïza, Benchaïra - Adiko, Lemmouchia, Serey, Djediat - Hadj Aïssa (Moumen 87'), Ziaya (Mecheri 76').

1 May 2008 Second leg	ES Sétif (Algeria)	1–0	(Egypt) Tala'ea El-Gaish	Sétif
	Ziaya 65'	Report		Stadium: Stade 8 Mai 1945; Referee: Djallal Khalil (Saudi Arabia)
Note: Lineup for ES Sétif - Ferradji - Raho, Laïfaoui, Maïza, Benchaïra - Serey, Lemmouchia, Djediat - Adiko, Ziaya (Mecheri 84'), Hadj Aïssa (Moumen 78').

=== Final ===
9 May 2008 first leg	Wydad Casablanca (Morocco)	0–1	(Algeria) ES Sétif	Casablanca
		Report	Touil 80'	Stadium: Stade Mohamed V Referee: Aouaz Trabelsi (Tunisia)
Note: Lineup for ES Sétif - Ferradji - Raho, Laïfaoui, Maïza, Benchaïra - Die Serey, Lemmouchia, Djediat (Moumen 50') - Adiko (Mecheri 75'), Ziaya (Touil 78'), Hadj Aïssa.

22 May 2008 Second leg	ES Sétif (Algeria)	1–0	(Morocco) Wydad Casablanca	Blida
	Ziaya 30'	Report		Stadium: Mustapha Tchaker Stadium; Referee: Saad Kamil Al-Fadhli (Kuwait)
Note: Lineup for ES Sétif - Hadjaoui - Raho, Laïfaoui, Maïza, Benchaïra - Lemmouchia, Moumen, Die Serey - Adiko (Alex 85'), Ziaya, Hadj Aïssa.

== Squad information ==
=== Playing statistics ===
No.	Pos	Nat	Player	Total		Division 1		Algerian Cup		Super Cup		CAF CL1		Arab CL	
No.	Pos	Nat	Player	Apps	Goals	Apps	Goals	Apps	Goals	Apps	Goals	Apps	Goals	Apps	Goals
Goalkeepers
19	GK	(Algeria) ALG	Samir Hadjaoui	36	0	24	0	0	0	0	0	2	0	10	0
	GK	(Algeria) ALG	Mohamed Seghir Ferradji	11	0	5	0	0	0	0	0	2	0	4	0
1	GK	(Algeria) ALG	Abderaouf Natèche	2	0	1	0	0	0	1	0	0	0	0	0
Defenders
5	DF	(Algeria) ALG	Adel Maïza	39	3	23	2	0	0	1	0	3	0	12	1
4	DF	(Algeria) ALG	Abdelkader Laifaoui	41	1	24	0	0	0	1	0	4	0	12	1
25	DF	(Algeria) ALG	Hamza Zeddam	16	0	9	0	0	0	1	0	2	0	4	0
28	DF	(Algeria) ALG	Mohamed Mehdi Defnoun	9	0	6	0	0	0	0	0	1	0	2	0
17	DF	(Algeria) ALG	Slimane Raho	38	0	23	0	0	0	0	0	3	0	12	0
	DF	(Algeria) ALG	Farès Boudemagh	5	0	5	0	0	0	0	0	0	0	0	0
27	DF	(Algeria) ALG	Mohamed Yekhlef	19	0	14	0	0	0	1	0	0	0	4	0
3	DF	(Algeria) ALG	Riad Benchadi	28	1	17	1	0	0	1	0	2	0	8	0
Midfielders
18	MF	(Algeria) ALG	Ali Moumen	30	0	16	0	0	0	1	0	2	0	11	0
8	MF	(Algeria) ALG	Khaled Lemmouchia	41	0	24	0	0	0	1	0	3	0	13	0
13	MF	(Algeria) ALG	Mourad Delhoum	26	2	16	1	0	0	1	0	2	1	7	0
	MF	(Ivory Coast) CIV	Alex Somian	27	0	22	0	0	0	0	0	0	0	5	0
6	MF	(Algeria) ALG	Azzedine Benchaira	32	0	20	0	0	0	0	0	2	0	10	0
6	MF	(Ivory Coast) CIV	Serey Dié	22	2	11	1	0	0	0	0	4	1	7	0
	MF	(Algeria) ALG	Abdelmoumene Bella	1	0	1	0	0	0	0	0	0	0	0	0
14	MF	(Algeria) ALG	Lamouri Djediat	43	10	26	5	0	0	1	0	4	1	12	4
	MF	(Algeria) ALG	Abdelmoumene Djabou	22	2	15	1	0	0	1	0	1	0	5	1
10	MF	(Algeria) ALG	Lazhar Hadj Aïssa	20	2	10	1	0	0	0	0	3	1	7	0
21	MF	(Ivory Coast) CIV	Rémi Adiko	35	7	18	3	0	0	0	0	4	1	13	3
Forwards
	FW	(Algeria) ALG	Mohamed Badache	7	0	5	0	0	0	0	0	2	0	0	0
9	FW	(Algeria) ALG	Abdelmalek Ziaya	40	10	23	5	0	0	1	0	3	2	13	3
15	FW	(Algeria) ALG	Farid Touil	33	14	20	7	0	0	1	0	3	1	9	6
12	FW	(Algeria) ALG	Fares Mecheri	24	6	15	4	0	0	1	0	2	1	6	1
11	FW	(Algeria) ALG	Arezki Hamza Dambri	7	0	5	0	0	0	0	0	0	0	2	0
	FW	(Algeria) ALG	Sofiane Bencharif	2	0	0	0	0	0	0	0	2	0	0	0
Players transferred out during the season

Last updated: 6 october

=== Goalscorers ===
Includes all competitive matches. The list is sorted alphabetically by surname when total goals are equal.

No.	Nat.	Player	Pos.	D1	AC	SC	CL 1	ACL	TOTAL
15	(Algeria)	Farid Touil	FW	7	0	0	1	6	14
14	(Algeria)	Lamouri Djediat	MF	5	0	0	1	5	11
9	(Algeria)	Abdelmalek Ziaya	FW	5	0	0	2	3	10
21	(Ivory Coast)	Rémi Adiko	MF	3	0	0	1	3	7
12	(Algeria)	Fares Mecheri	FW	4	0	0	1	1	6
5	(Algeria)	Adel Maïza	DF	2	0	0	0	1	3
	(Algeria)	Abdelmoumene Djabou	MF	1	0	0	0	1	2
10	(Algeria)	Lazhar Hadj Aïssa	MF	1	0	0	1	0	2
13	(Algeria)	Mourad Delhoum	MF	1	0	0	1	0	2
6	(Algeria)	Serey Dié	MF	1	0	0	1	0	2
4	(Algeria)	Abdelkader Laifaoui	DF	0	0	0	0	1	1
3	(Algeria)	Riad Benchadi	DF	1	0	0	0	0	1
Own Goals				1	0	0	0	1	2
Totals				32	0	0	9	22	63

== Transfers ==
=== In ===
Date	Pos	Player	From club	Transfer fee	Source
26 June 2007	FW	(Algeria) Fares Mecheri	(France) AS Lyon-Duchère	Undisclosed	
1 July 2007	GK	(Algeria) Mohamed Seghir Ferradji	OMR El Annasser	Undisclosed	
1 July 2007	GK	(Algeria) Abderaouf Natèche	USM El Harrach	Free transfer	
1 July 2007	DF	(Algeria) Abdelkader Laifaoui	CR Belouizdad	Undisclosed	
1 July 2007	DF	(Algeria) Hamza Zeddam	CS Constantine	Undisclosed	
1 July 2007	MF	(Ivory Coast) Alex Somian	(Ivory Coast) JC d'Abidjan	Undisclosed	
1 July 2007	MF	(Ivory Coast) Serey Dié	(Tunisia) EO Goulette Kram	Undisclosed	
1 July 2007	MF	(Algeria) Ali Moumen	MC Oran	Undisclosed	
1 July 2007	MF	(Algeria) Lamouri Djediat	Paradou AC	230,000 €	
1 July 2007	FW	(Algeria) Mohamed Badache	MC Alger	Undisclosed	
