= 2008–09 ES Sétif season =

ES Sétif
2008–09 season
- President: Abdelhakim Serrar
- Head Coach: Darko Janackovic (until 22 September 2008); Azzedine Aït Djoudi (from 20 September 2008) (until 27 April 2009); Ali Mechiche (from 5 May 2009)
- Stadium: Stade 8 Mai 1945
- National 1: Winner
- Algerian Cup: Semi-finals
- Confederation Cup: Play-off round
- Arab Champions League: Semi-finals
- Top goalscorer: League: Lamouri Djediat (12); All: Abdelmalek Ziaya (18)

The 2008–09 season was ES Sétif's 39th season in the Algerian top flight. They competed in National 1, the CAF Confederation Cup and the Algerian Cup.

== Squad list ==
Players and squad numbers last updated on 1 September 2008.
Note: Flags indicate national team as has been defined under FIFA eligibility rules. Players may hold more than one non-FIFA nationality.

No.	Nat.	Position	Name	Date of birth (age)	Signed from
Goalkeepers
	(Algeria)	GK	Samir Hadjaoui	16 February 1979 (aged 29)	(Algeria) CR Belouizdad
	(Algeria)	GK	Mohamed Seghir Ferradji	22 August 1975 (aged 32)	(Algeria)
Defenders
	(Algeria)	CB / RB	Abdelkader Laifaoui	9 July 1981 (aged 27)	(Algeria) CR Belouizdad
	(Algeria)	RB	Slimane Raho	20 October 1975 (aged 32)	(Algeria) JS Kabylie
	(Algeria)	LB	Mohamed Yekhlef	12 July 1981 (aged 27)	(Algeria) WA Tlemcen
	(Algeria)	LB	Riad Benchadi	7 November 1978 (aged 29)	(Algeria) CA Bordj Bou Arreridj
Midfielders
	(Algeria)	DM	Khaled Lemmouchia	6 December 1981 (aged 26)	(France) AS Lyon Duchère
	(Algeria)	DM	Mourad Delhoum	10 February 1985 (aged 23)	(Algeria) Amal Bou Saâda
	(Algeria)	DM	Azzedine Benchaira	2 November 1978 (aged 29)	(Algeria) US Biskra
	(Algeria)	AM / RW	Lamouri Djediat	20 January 1981 (aged 27)	(Algeria) Paradou AC
	(Algeria)	AM	Lazhar Hadj Aïssa	23 March 1984 (aged 24)	(Algeria) MSP Batna
	(Ivory Coast)	AM	Rémi Adiko	15 January 1982 (aged 26)	(Republic of the Congo) Diables Noirs
Forwards
	(Algeria)	CF	Abdelmalek Ziaya	23 January 1984 (aged 24)	(Algeria) ES Guelma

== Competitions ==
=== Overview ===
Competition	Record								Started round	Final position / round	First match	Last match
Competition	G	W	D	L	GF	GA	GD	Win %	Started round	Final position / round	First match	Last match
National	32	18	8	6	52	25	+27	56.25	—N/a	Winner	8 August 2008	28 May 2009
Algerian Cup	5	4	1	0	8	2	+6	80.00	Round of 64	Semi-finals	15 January 2009	23 April 2009
Confederation Cup	6	4	0	2	15	9	+6	66.67	First round	Play-off round	13 March 2009	31 May 2009
Arab Champions League	7	3	2	2	9	8	+1	42.86	Round 32	Semi finals	28 October 2009	26 April 2009
Total	50	29	11	10	84	44	+40	58.00				

Updated to match played 3 June 2019
Source: Competitions

=== National ===
==== League table ====
Pos	Team	Pld	W	D	L	GF	GA	GD	Pts	Qualification or relegation
1	ES Sétif (C, Q)	32	18	8	6	52	25	+27	62	2010 CAF Champions League
2	JS Kabylie (Q)	32	15	14	3	38	19	+19	59	2010 CAF Champions League
3	JSM Béjaïa	32	15	8	9	33	20	+13	53	
4	CR Belouizdad (Q)	32	15	5	12	33	27	+6	50	2010 CAF Confederation Cup
5	MC Alger	32	13	10	9	40	38	+2	49	

Source: DZFoot 1er Division 2008-2009
Rules for classification: 1) points; 2) goal difference; 3) number of goals scored.
(C) Champions; (Q) Qualified for the phase indicated

==== Results summary ====
Overall								Home						Away					
Pld	W	D	L	GF	GA	GD	Pts	W	D	L	GF	GA	GD	W	D	L	GF	GA	GD
32	18	8	6	52	25	+27	62	14	2	0	34	10	+24	4	6	6	18	15	+3

Last updated: 22 April 2018.
Source: Competitive matches

==== Results by round ====
Round	1	2	3	4	5	6	7	8	9	10	11	12	13	14	15	16	17	18	19	20	21	22	23	24	25	26	27	28	29	30	31	32
Ground	H	A	H	A	H	A	H	A	H	A	H	A	H	A	H	A	A	H	A	H	A	H	A	H	A	H	A	H	A	H	A	H
Result	W	L	W	L	D	D	W	W	W	L	W	D	W	D	W	W	W	W	D	W	L	W	D	W	W	D	D	W	L	W	L	W
Position	1	7	4	9	9	8	3	2	2	2	2	1	1	1	1	1	1	1	1	1	1	1	1	1	1	1	1	1	1	1	1	1

Source: Competitive matches
A = Away; H = Home; W = Win; D = Draw; L = Loss

==== Matches ====
Win Draw Loss

8 August 2008 Round 1	ES Sétif	3–0	AS Khroub	Sétif
18:00	Hemani 17'; Djediat 86', 90'	Report		Stadium: Stade 8 Mai 1945; Referee: Mokhtar Amalou

11 August 2008 Round 2	JSM Béjaïa	1–0	ES Sétif	Béjaïa
18:00	Ghazi 51'	Report		Stadium: Stade de l'Unité Maghrébine; Referee: Mohamed Bichari

25 August 2008 Round 3	ES Sétif	5–2	USM Annaba	Sétif
20:30	Djediat 3'; Diss 45'; Ziaya 60', 67'; Seguer 85'	Report	Hamidi 77'	Stadium: Stade 8 Mai 1945; Referee: Mohamed Benouza

29 August 2008 Round 4	CA Bordj Bou Arréridj	1–0	ES Sétif	Bordj Bou Arréridj
18:00	Loucif 57'	Report		Stadium: August 20, 1955 Stadium; Referee: Mohamed Amine Benaissa

11 September 2008 Round 5	ES Sétif	1–1	USM Alger	Sétif
23:30	Hemani 13'	Report	Rial 27'	Stadium: Stade 8 Mai 1945; Referee: Abdelkader Abed

18 September 2008 Round 6	CR Belouizdad	1–1	ES Sétif	Belouizdad
16:00	Berguiga 69'	Report	Seguer 54'	Stadium: Stade 20 Août 1955; Referee: Touati Djaballah

26 September 2008 Round 7	ES Sétif	3–1	MSP Batna	Sétif
23:30	Hemani 14'; Djediat 34', 60'	Report	Reziouak 82'	Stadium: Stade 8 Mai 1945; Referee: Mehdi Abid Charef

12 December 2008 Round 8	RC Kouba	0–1	ES Sétif	Kouba
15:00		Report	Djediat 60'	Stadium: Stade Omar Benhaddad; Referee: Abdelkader Abed

16 October 2008 Round 9	ES Sétif	1–0	MC Saïda	Sétif
19:00	Djediat 71'	Report		Stadium: Stade 8 Mai 1945; Referee: Mohamed Haddada

19 January 2009 Round 10	JS Kabylie	2–1	ES Sétif	Tizi Ouzou
14:30	Bensaïd 62'; Achiou 73'	Report	Hemani 85'	Stadium: Stade 1er Novembre 1954; Referee: Djamel Haimoudi

31 October 2008 Round 11	ES Sétif	2–1	USM Blida	Sétif
18:00	Djediat 17', 90'	Report	Hamiti 78'	Stadium: Stade 8 Mai 1945; Referee: Mohamed Fettouha

10 November 2008 Round 12	NA Hussein Dey	0–0	ES Sétif	Belouizdad
14:30		Report		Stadium: Stade 20 Août 1955; Referee: Mohamed Benouza

14 November 2008 Round 13	ES Sétif	1–0	MC Alger	Sétif
18:00	Ziaya 38'	Report		Stadium: Stade 8 Mai 1945; Referee: Touati Djaballah

2 January 2008 Round 14	ASO Chlef	1–1	ES Sétif	Chlef
15:00	Biyaga 90'	Report	Delhoum 53'	Stadium: Stade Mohamed Boumezrag; Referee: Mohamed Haddada

5 December 2008 Round 15	ES Sétif	2–0	MC El Eulma	Sétif
18:00	Hemani 26'; Ziaya 33'	Report		Stadium: Stade 8 Mai 1945; Referee: Djamel Haimoudi

30 January 2008 Round 16	USM El Harrach	0–3	ES Sétif	El Harrach
15:00	Guessoum 49'	Report	Diss 35'; Delhoum 56'	Stadium: November 1, 1954 Stadium; Referee: Mustapha Boumediene Mansouri

15 February 2009 Round 17	AS Khroub	0–2	ES Sétif	El Khroub
14:30		Report	Hemani 20', 63'	Stadium: Abed Hamdani Stadium; Referee: Mohamed Bichari

19 February 2009 Round 18	ES Sétif	1–0	JSM Béjaïa	Sétif
18:00	Hemani 45'	Report		Stadium: Stade 8 Mai 1945; Referee: Belkacem Boumaza

26 February 2009 Round 19	USM Annaba	1–1	ES Sétif	Annaba
14:30	Aoudia 63'	Report	Raho 89'	Stadium: Stade 19 Mai 1956; Referee: Mohamed Amine Benaissa

9 March 2009 Round 20	ES Sétif	3–0	CA Bordj Bou Arréridj	Sétif
18:00		Report		Stadium: Stade 8 Mai 1945

6 March 2009 Round 21	USM Alger	1–0	ES Sétif	Bologhine
15:00	Ammour 84'	Report		Stadium: Omar Hamadi Stadium; Referee: Djamel Haimoudi

16 March 2009 Round 22	ES Sétif	2–0	CR Belouizdad	Sétif
18:00	Ziaya 37', 59'	Report		Stadium: Stade 8 Mai 1945; Referee: Okba Benbaka

11 May 2009 Round 23	MSP Batna	0–0	ES Sétif	Batna
14:30		Report		Stadium: Stade 1er Novembre 1954; Referee: Mohamed Benouza

20 April 2009 Round 24	ES Sétif	3–2	RC Kouba	Sétif
18:00	Diss 2'; Djediat 20'; Adiko 66'	Report	Sako 47'; Benyahia 60'	Stadium: Stade 8 Mai 1945; Referee: Farouk Houasnia

18 May 2009 Round 25	MC Saïda	2–5	ES Sétif	Saïda
15:00	Dampha 59'; Seddik 71'	Report	Delhoum 19', 80'; Djediat 24'; Feham 39'; Adiko 56'	Stadium: Stade 13 Avril 1958; Referee: Mokhtar Amalou

22 May 2009 Round 26	ES Sétif	1–1	JS Kabylie	Sétif
19:00	Hemani 61'	Report	Meftah 68'	Stadium: Stade 8 Mai 1945; Referee: Mohamed Bichari

13 April 2009 Round 27	USM Blida	0–0	ES Sétif	Blida
14:30		Report		Stadium: Stade Mustapha Tchaker; Referee: Djamel Haimoudi

25 May 2009 Round 28	ES Sétif	2–0	NA Hussein Dey	Sétif
19:00	Seguer 30'; Djediat 73'	Report		Stadium: Stade 8 Mai 1945; Referee: Farouk Mial

4 June 2009 Round 29	MC Alger	2–1	ES Sétif	Algiers
16:00	Boumechra 49', 52'	Report	Hemani 65'	Stadium: Stade du 5 Juillet; Referee: Said Aouina

8 May 2009 Round 30	ES Sétif	2–1	ASO Chlef	Sétif
19:00	Ziaya 41', 66'	Report	Ali Hadji 25'	Stadium: Stade 8 Mai 1945; Referee: Mohamed Bouali

8 June 2009 Round 31	MC El Eulma	3–2	ES Sétif	El Eulma
16:00	Gasmi 42'; Loumane 57'; Mongolo 82'	Report	Selloum 23', 38'	Stadium: Stade Messaoud Zougar; Referee: Rafik Achouri

28 May 2009 Round 32	ES Sétif	2–1	USM El Harrach	Sétif
19:00	Hemani 5'; Metref 21'	Report	Touahri 48'	Stadium: Stade 8 Mai 1945; Referee: Mehdi Rahmouni

== Algerian Cup ==
15 January 2009 Round of 64	ES Sétif	1–0	USM El Harrach

23 January 2009 Round of 32	MC Saïda	0–1	ES Sétif	Belouizdad
				Stadium: Stade 20 Août 1955

8 February 2009 Round of 16	USM Blida	0–1	ES Sétif	Belouizdad
14:00		Report	Benchadi 31'	Stadium: Stade 20 Août 1955; Referee: Abdelkader Abed

26 March 2009 Quarter-finals	ES Sétif	4–1	ES Ben Aknoun	Belouizdad
14:00	Hemani 3', 47'; Feham 51'; Seguer 67'	Report	Mohamed Belhinouz 70'	Stadium: Stade 20 Août 1955; Referee: Mohamed Bouhenni

23 April 2009 Semi-finals	ES Sétif	1–1 (4–5 p)	CA Bordj Bou Arreridj	Batna
14:00	Metref 28'	Report	Bouharbit 90'	Stadium: Stade 1er Novembre 1954
	Penalties
	Bouazza Feham (penalty scored); Francis Ambane (penalty missed); Smaïl Diss (penalty scored); Mourad Delhoum (penalty scored); Hocine Metref (penalty missed)		(penalty scored) Ameur Abdenour Loucif; (penalty scored) Abdelhak Mansour; (penalty scored) Khelifa Bakha; (penalty missed) Sid Ahmed Belouahem; (penalty scored) Samir Bentayeb

== Confederation Cup ==
=== First round ===
13 March 2009 First leg	Khaleej Sirte (Libya)	0–1	(Algeria) ES Sétif	Sirte
		Report	Ziaya 14'	Stadium: Sirte Stadium; Referee: Mohamed Houssen El Fadil (Sudan)

3 April 2009 Second leg	ES Sétif (Algeria)	5–0	(Libya) Khaleej Sirte	Sétif
	Aksas 29'; Ziaya 46'; Djediat 48', 56'; Seguer 82'	Report		Stadium: Stade 8 Mai 1945; Referee: Yosr Saadallah (Tunisia)

=== Second round ===
17 April 2009 First leg	ES Sétif (Algeria)	4–0	(Angola) CRD Libolo	Sétif
	Hemani 10'; Djediat 45'; Ziaya 65', 87'	Report		Stadium: Stade 8 Mai 1945; Referee: Cheikh Ahmed Seck (Senegal)

3 May 2009 Second leg	CRD Libolo (Angola)	5–1	(Algeria) ES Sétif	Calulo
		Report	Ambané 29'	Stadium: Estádio Patrice Lumumba; Referee: Jean-Claude Labrosse (Seychelles)

=== Play-off round ===
15 May 2009 First leg	ES Sétif (Algeria)	3–1	(Mali) Djoliba	Sétif
	Delhoum 28'; Ziaya 32'; Ambané 60'	Report		Stadium: Stade 8 Mai 1945; Referee: Khalid Abdel Rahman (Sudan)

31 May 2009 Second leg	Djoliba (Mali)	3–1 (3–4 p)	(Algeria) ES Sétif	Bamako
		Report	Delhoum 15'	Stadium: Stade Modibo Kéïta; Referee: Daniel Bennett (South Africa)

== Arab Champions League ==
=== Round 32 ===
28 October 2009 First leg	ES Sétif (Algeria)	3–2	(Lebanon) Al Ansar FC	Sétif
	Ziaya 40', 65'; Ambané 45'	Report	Diss 77' (o.g.); T'chami 89'	Stadium: Stade 8 Mai 1945; Referee: Abderahmane Rachou (Syria)
Note: Lineup for ES Sétif - Hadjaoui - Raho, Laïfaoui, Diss, Yekhlef - Benchaïra, Ambane, Djediat - Feham (Seguer 69') - Ziaya (Aksas 87'), Hemani.

26 November 2009 Second leg	Al Ansar FC (Lebanon)	0–0	(Algeria) ES Sétif	Beirut
		Report		Referee: ?
Note: Lineup for ES Sétif - Ferradji - Raho, Laïfaoui, Aksas, Yekhlef - Djediat, Beklaïd, Lemmouchia, Ambane (Adiko 73') - Hadj Aïssa (Feham 88'), Ziaya (Hemani 73').

=== Round 16 ===
15 December 2009 First leg	Al-Hilal (Sudan)	1–2	(Algeria) ES Sétif	Omdurman
	Ifani 90' (pen.)	Report	Laifaoui 45'; Belkaid 51'	Stadium: Al-Hilal Stadium; Referee: Khallil Jallel (Saudi Arabia)
Note: Lineup for ES Sétif - Ferradji - Raho, Laïfaoui, Aksas, Yekhlef - Lemmouchia (Benchaïra 87'), Belkaïd, Ambane - Djediat (Ziaya 75') - Hadj Aïssa, Hemani (Adiko 64').

28 December 2009 Second leg	ES Sétif (Algeria)	Cancelled	(Sudan) Al-Hilal	Sétif
				Stadium: Stade 8 Mai 1945

=== Quarter finals ===
3 March 2009 First leg	US Monastir (Tunisia)	1–1	(Algeria) ES Sétif	Monastir
	Benbelkacem 60'	Report	Hemani 57'	Stadium: Stade Mustapha Ben Jannet; Referee: Attalah Laânizi (Kuwait)
Note: Lineup for ES Sétif - Ferradji - Raho, Aksas, Diss, Laïfaoui, Metref - Djediat (Delhoum 85'), Lemmouchia, Hadj Aïssa (c.) (Adiko, 88'), Ambane - Hemani.

20 March 2009 Second leg	ES Sétif (Algeria)	3–1	(Tunisia) US Monastir	Sétif
	Ziaya 6', 27', 42'	Report	Hannachi 19'	Stadium: Stade 8 Mai 1945; Referee: Ahmed Dellou (Syria)
Note: Lineup for ES Sétif - Hadjaoui - Raho (Aksas 64'), Laïfaoui, Diss, Metref - Delhoum, Lemmouchia, Ambane - Djediat (Seguer 70') - Hadj Aïssa, Ziaya (Hemani).

=== Semi finals ===
11 April 2009 First leg	ES Sétif (Algeria)	0–1	(Tunisia) Espérance de Tunis	Sétif
20:00		Report	Darragi 75'	Stadium: Stade 8 Mai 1945; Referee: Abdellah El Hilali (Oman)
Note: Lineup for ES Sétif - Ferradji - Raho (c.), Laïfaoui, Diss, Metref - Delhoum (Hemani, 61'), Belkaïd, Djediat, Ambane (Adiko, 79') - Hadj Aïssa (Feham, 79'), Ziaya.

26 April 2009 Second leg	Espérance de Tunis (Tunisia)	2–0	(Algeria) ES Sétif	El Menzah
16:30	Souissi 7' (pen.); Bouazzi 86'	Report		Stadium: Stade El Menzah; Referee: Essam Abd El Fatah (Egypt)
Note: Lineup for ES Sétif - Hadjaoui - Raho, Laïfaoui, Diss, Yekhlef (Adiko 32') - Delhoum, Belkaïd, Metref - Djediat (Ambane 54’) - Ziaya, Hemani (Seguer 65’).

== Squad information ==
=== Playing statistics ===
No.	Pos	Nat	Player	Total		National 1		Algerian Cup		Confederation Cup		Arab Champions League	
No.	Pos	Nat	Player	Apps	Goals	Apps	Goals	Apps	Goals	Apps	Goals	Apps	Goals
Goalkeepers
16	GK	(Algeria) ALG	Samir Hadjaoui	23	0	15	0	2	0	3	0	3	0
30	GK	(Algeria) ALG	Mohamed Seghir Ferradji	23	0	15	0	1	0	3	0	4	0
1	GK	(Algeria) ALG	Boualem Benmalek	1	0	1	0	0	0	0	0	0	0
Defenders
5	DF	(Algeria) ALG	Smail Diss	38	3	25	3	2	0	6	0	5	0
3	DF	(Algeria) ALG	Abdelkader Laifaoui	39	1	25	0	2	0	5	0	7	1
25	DF	(Algeria) ALG	Amine Aksas	26	1	15	0	2	0	4	1	5	0
20	DF	(Algeria) ALG	Mokhtar Megueni	6	0	4	0	1	0	1	0	0	0
17	DF	(Algeria) ALG	Slimane Raho	33	1	20	1	1	0	5	0	7	0
27	DF	(Algeria) ALG	Mohamed Yekhlef	29	0	18	0	2	0	5	0	4	0
3	DF	(Algeria) ALG	Riad Benchadi	20	1	15	0	2	1	3	0	0	0
	DF	(Algeria) ALG	Mohamed Aït Kaci	4	0	3	0	1	0	0	0	0	0
	DF	(Algeria) ALG	Mohamed Aissaoui	1	0	1	0	0	0	0	0	0	0
Midfielders
7	MF	(Algeria) ALG	Farouk Belkaid	32	1	23	0	2	0	3	0	4	1
8	MF	(Algeria) ALG	Khaled Lemmouchia	23	0	16	0	1	0	2	0	4	0
13	MF	(Algeria) ALG	Mourad Delhoum	33	6	21	4	3	0	5	2	4	0
6	MF	(Algeria) ALG	Azzedine Benchaira	16	0	12	0	1	0	1	0	2	0
	MF	(Chad) CHA	Sylvain Idangar	2	0	2	0	0	0	0	0	0	0
	MF	(Algeria) ALG	Hocine Metref	25	2	16	1	1	1	4	0	4	0
15	MF	(Algeria) ALG	Bouazza Feham	31	2	20	1	2	1	6	0	3	0
	MF	(Algeria) ALG	Abdeslam Selloum	1	2	1	2	0	0	0	0	0	0
14	MF	(Algeria) ALG	Lamouri Djediat	39	15	26	12	2	0	4	3	7	0
10	MF	(Algeria) ALG	Lazhar Hadj Aïssa	27	0	19	0	2	0	1	0	5	0
21	MF	(Ivory Coast) CIV	Rémi Adiko	26	2	15	2	1	0	5	0	5	0
Forwards
	FW	(Algeria) ALG	Younes Kadri	1	0	1	0	0	0	0	0	0	0
11	FW	(Algeria) ALG	Mohamed Seguer	25	5	17	3	2	1	3	1	3	0
29	FW	(Algeria) ALG	Nabil Hemani	42	15	28	11	3	2	4	1	7	1
9	FW	(Algeria) ALG	Abdelmalek Ziaya	32	18	19	8	3	0	4	5	6	5
24	FW	(Cameroon) CMR	Francis Ambané	41	3	27	0	3	2	4	0	7	1
Players transferred out during the season

Last updated: 19 November 2017

=== Goalscorers ===
Includes all competitive matches. The list is sorted alphabetically by surname when total goals are equal.

No.	Nat.	Player	Pos.	N 1	AC	CC 3	ACL	TOTAL
9	(Algeria)	Abdelmalek Ziaya	FW	8	0	5	5	18
29	(Algeria)	Nabil Hemani	FW	11	2	1	1	15
14	(Algeria)	Lamouri Djediat	MF	12	0	3	0	15
13	(Algeria)	Mourad Delhoum	MF	4	0	2	0	6
11	(Algeria)	Mohamed Seguer	FW	3	1	1	0	5
5	(Algeria)	Smail Diss	DF	3	0	0	0	3
24	(Cameroon)	Francis Ambané	FW	0	2	0	1	3
	(Algeria)	Hocine Metref	MF	1	1	0	0	2
15	(Algeria)	Bouazza Feham	MF	1	1	0	0	2
	(Algeria)	Abdeslam Selloum	MF	2	0	0	0	2
21	(Ivory Coast)	Rémi Adiko	MF	2	0	0	0	2
7	(Algeria)	Farouk Belkaid	MF	0	0	0	1	1
3	(Algeria)	Abdelkader Laifaoui	DF	0	0	0	1	1
25	(Algeria)	Amine Aksas	DF	0	0	1	0	1
17	(Algeria)	Slimane Raho	DF	1	0	0	0	1
3	(Algeria)	Riad Benchadi	DF	0	1	0	0	1
Own Goals				0	0	0	0	0
Totals				52	8	15	9	84

== Transfers ==
=== In ===
Date	Pos	Player	From club	Transfer fee	Source
18 June 2008	DF	(Algeria) Amine Aksas	CR Belouizdad	Undisclosed	
25 June 2008	MF	(Algeria) Bouazza Feham	MC Oran	Undisclosed	
1 July 2008	DF	(Algeria) Mokhtar Megueni	USM Oran	Undisclosed	
1 July 2008	MF	(Algeria) Farouk Belkaid	MC Alger	Undisclosed	
1 July 2008	MF	(Chad) Sylvain Idangar	(Saudi Arabia) Al-Watani	Free transfer	
1 July 2008	MF	(Algeria) Mohamed Seguer	MC Saïda	Undisclosed	
1 July 2008	MF	(Algeria) Nabil Hemani	JS Kabylie	Undisclosed	
1 July 2008	MF	(Cameroon) Francis Ambané	(Cameroon) Canon Yaoundé	Undisclosed	
13 July 2008	DF	(Algeria) Smail Diss	USM Blida	Undisclosed	
16 December 2008	MF	(Algeria) Hocine Metref	(France) Dijon FCO	Free transfer	
1 January 2009	DF	(Algeria) Mohamed Aït Kaci	JS Kabylie	Undisclosed	
