= List of ES Sétif players =

Below is a list of notable footballers who have played for ES Sétif. Generally, this means players that have played 100 or more league matches for the club. However, some players who have played fewer matches are also included; this includes players that have had considerable success either at other clubs or at international level, as well as players who are well remembered by the supporters for particular reasons.

Players are listed in alphabetical order according to the date of their first-team official debut for the club. Appearances and goals are for first-team competitive matches only. Substitute appearances included. Statistics accurate as of 26 May 2019.

== List of ES Sétif players ==
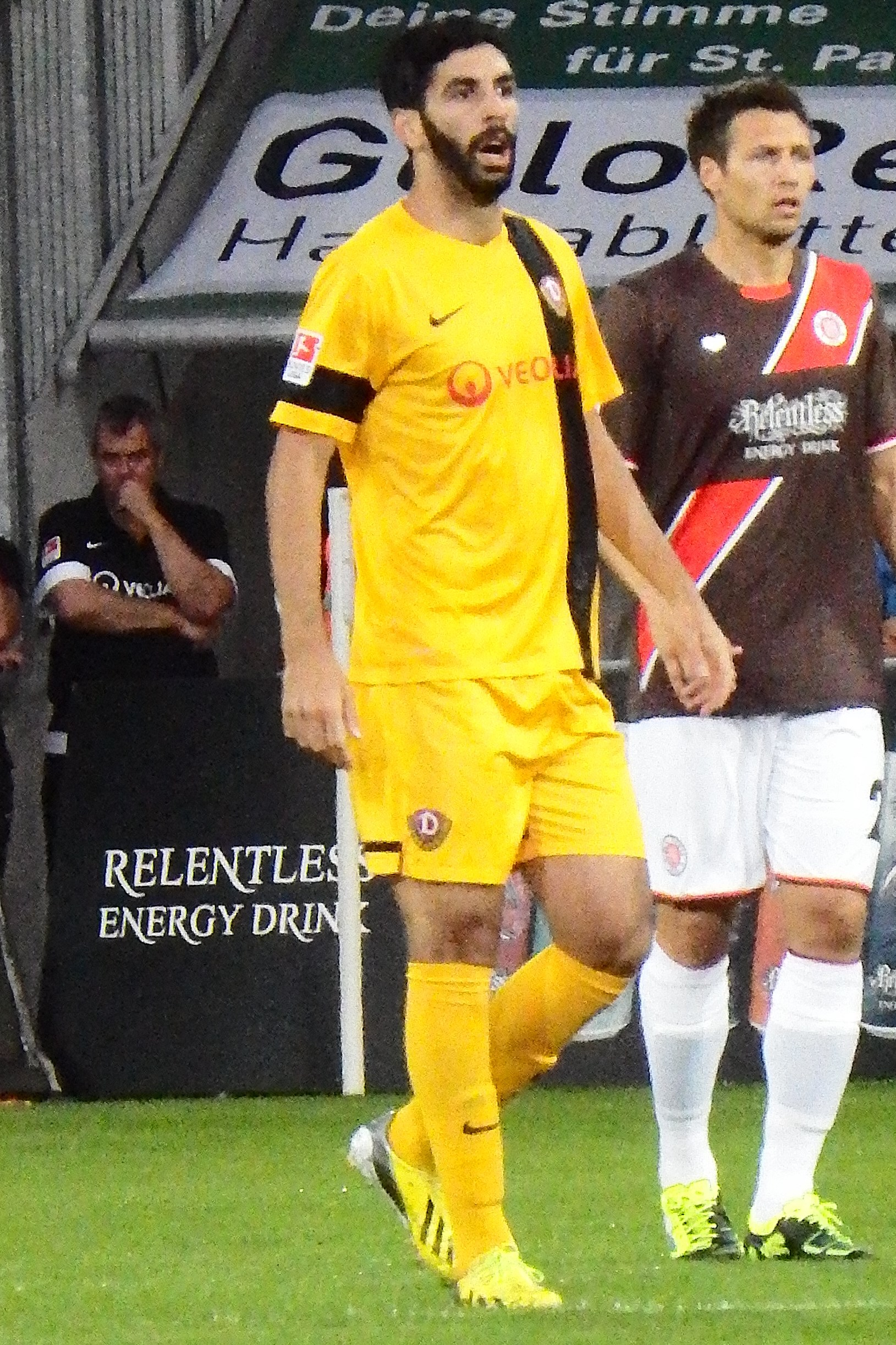
Mohamed Amine Aoudia.

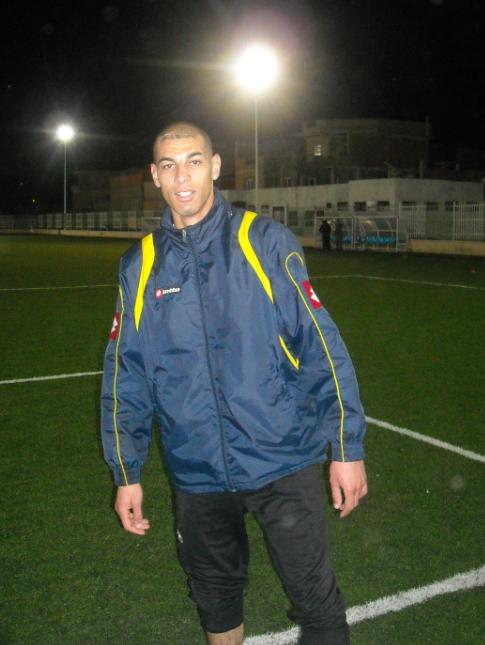
Faouzi Chaouchi.

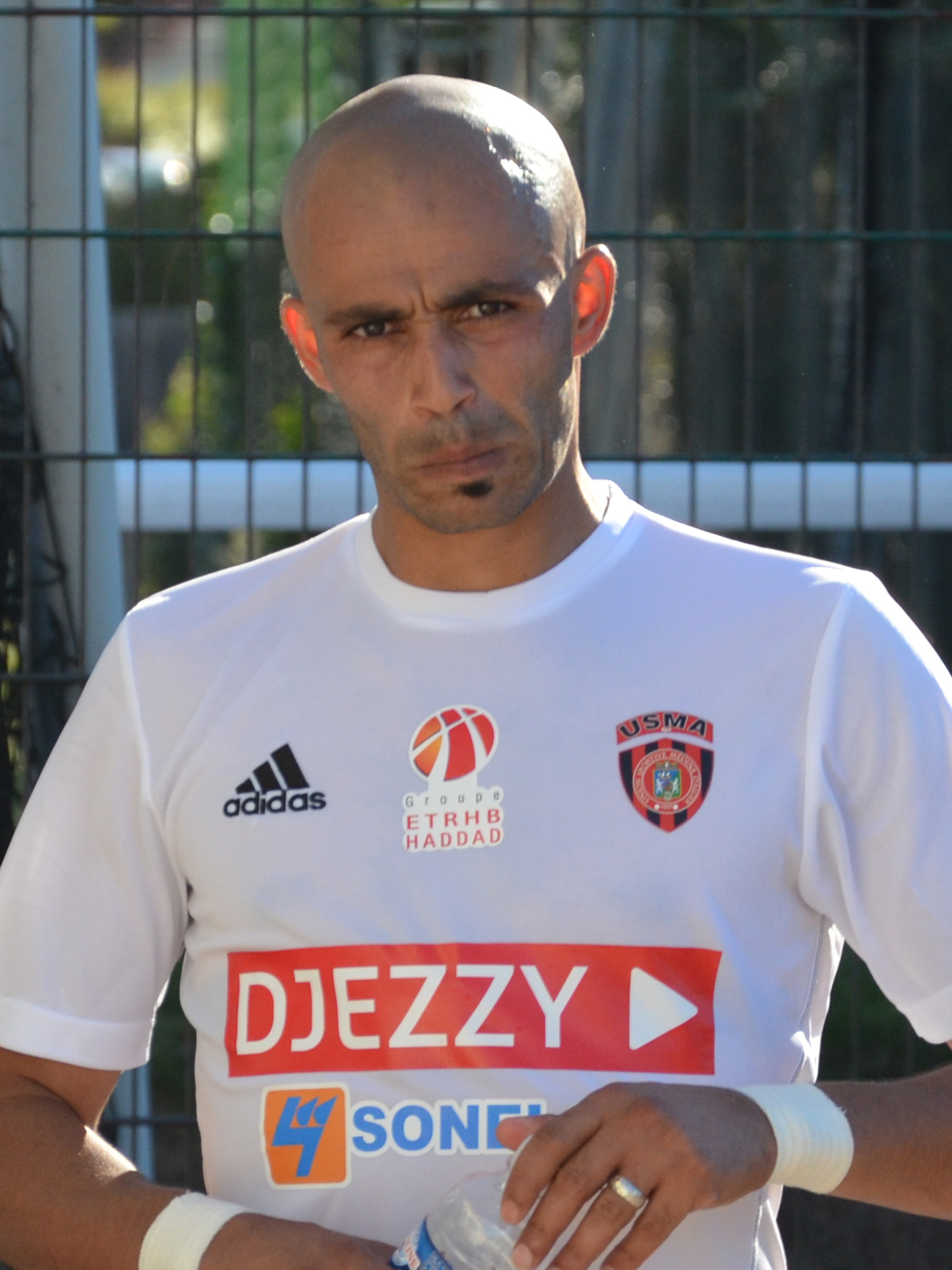
Mokhtar Benmoussa.

Name	Nat.	Pos.	Inter career	Apps	Goals	Ref.
Isâad Bourahli	(Algeria)	FW	1992–95, 1982–2001, 2003–04, 2005–07	0	0	
Samir Hadjaoui	(Algeria)	GK	2006–09	78	0	
Mohamed Seghir Ferradji	(Algeria)	GK	2007–11	58	1	
Smail Diss	(Algeria)	DF	2008–12	127	10	
Abdelkader Laifaoui	(Algeria)	DF	2007–11	139	4	
Amine Aksas	(Algeria)	DF	2008–09	25	2	
Mokhtar Megueni	(Algeria)	DF	2008–10	17	0	
Slimane Raho	(Algeria)	DF	2006–11	158	2	
Mohamed Yekhlef	(Algeria)	DF	2005–11	153	1	
Riad Benchadi	(Algeria)	DF	2006–14	158	6	
Farouk Belkaid	(Algeria)	MF	2008–13	158	0	
Khaled Lemmouchia	(Algeria)	MF	2006–11	154	1	
Mourad Delhoum	(Algeria)	MF	2004–13, 2015–16	293	33	
Azzedine Benchaira	(Algeria)	MF	2003–10	92	3	
Hocine Metref	(Algeria)	MF	2008–11	107	25	
Bouazza Feham	(Algeria)	MF	2008–11	105	10	
Lamouri Djediat	(Algeria)	MF	2007–10	100	26	
Lazhar Hadj Aïssa	(Algeria)	MF	2004–11, 2014–15	158	21	
Rémi Adiko	(Ivory Coast)	MF	2006–09	70	9	
Younes Kadri	(Algeria)	FW	2008–10	8	5	
Mohamed Seguer	(Algeria)	FW	2008–10	41	8	
Nabil Hemani	(Algeria)	FW	2008–11	97	40	
Abdelmalek Ziaya	(Algeria)	FW	2005–09, 2014–16	173	62	
Francis Ambané	(Cameroon)	FW	2008–11	89	7	
Mehdi Kacem	(Algeria)	MF	2009–10	29	1	
Karim Kaddour	(Algeria)	MF	2009–10	21	2	
Belkacem Zobiri	(Algeria)	MF	2009–10	18	0	
Sid Ali Lamri	(Algeria)	MF	2009–11, 2013–17	151	3	
Rafik Bouderbal	(Algeria)	MF	2009–10	8	1	
Hamid Berguiga	(Algeria)	FW	2009–10	14	2	
Sofiane Bencharif	(Algeria)	FW	2007–08, 2009–10	12	3	
Ilyes Korbiaa	(Algeria)	FW	2009–11, 2014–16	41	7	
Faouzi Chaouchi	(Algeria)	GK	2009–11	66	0	
Mokhtar Benmoussa	(Algeria)	DF	2010–12	66	15	
Abderahmane Hachoud	(Algeria)	DF	2010–12	71	17	
Adel Lakhdari	(Algeria)	DF	2010–13	47	1	
Said Arroussi	(Algeria)	DF	2010–17	95	3	
Antar Boucherit	(Algeria)	MF	2010	9	1	
Moustapha Djallit	(Algeria)	FW	2011	27	5	
Youcef Ghazali	(Algeria)	FW	2010–12	45	7	
Koh Traoré	(Burkina Faso)	FW	2010–11	8	3	
Abdelhakim Amokrane	(Algeria)	FW	2011–14, 2016–18	65	14	
Mohamed Benhamou	(Algeria)	GK	2010–12	32	0	
Nassim Benkhodja	(Algeria)	GK	2011–12	15	0	
Sofiane Bengoureïne	(Algeria)	DF	2012	10	0	
Kaled Gourmi	(Algeria)	MF	2011–14	93	13	
Sofiene Zaaboub	(Algeria)	MF	2011–12	20	1	
Mohamed El Amine Tiouli	(Algeria)	MF	2011–13	54	3	
Rachid Ferrahi	(Algeria)	MF	2011–14	91	2	
Mohamed Amine Aoudia	(Algeria)	FW	2011–13	57	31	
Cyrille Ndaney	(Cameroon)	FW	2011–12	6	3	
Alex Asamoah	(Ghana)	FW	2011	2	0	
Rachid Nadji	(Algeria)	FW	2011–14, 2016–18	104	32	
Nadjib Ghoul	(Algeria)	GK	2012–14	12	0	
Farès Benabderahmane	(Algeria)	DF	2012–14	51	1	
Demba Barry	(Mali)	DF	2012	5	0	
Mohamed Khoutir Ziti	(Algeria)	DF	2012–14, 2016–18	133	9	
Mohamed Lagraâ	(Algeria)	DF	2012–15	93	1	
Hacène El Okbi	(Algeria)	MF	2012–14	51	9	
Laïd Madouni	(Algeria)	FW	2012–14	52	12	
Koffi Mechac	(Ivory Coast)	FW	2012–13	12	1	
Mohamed Chalali	(Algeria)	FW	2012	14	3	
Karim Soltani	(Algeria)	FW	2012	7	1	
Abderaouf Belhani	(Algeria)	GK	2013–17	25	0	
Farid Mellouli	(Algeria)	DF	2013–15, 2017	64	2	
Lyes Boukria	(Algeria)	DF	2013–15	51	2	
Abdelghani Demmou	(Algeria)	DF	2013–15	50	1	
Benjamin Zé Ondo	(Gabon)	DF	2013–15	36	1	
Sofiane Bouchar	(Algeria)	DF	2013–17	70	2	
El Hedi Belameiri	(Algeria)	MF	2013–16	89	12	
Amine Touahri	(Algeria)	FW	2013–14	28	1	
Mohamed Tiaïba	(Algeria)	FW	2014	10	2	
Mohamed Billal Rait	(Algeria)	MF	2014–16	37	0	
Ahmed Gasmi	(Algeria)	FW	2014–15	24	4	
Sofiane Younès	(Algeria)	FW	2014–15	42	11	
Merouane Dahar	(Algeria)	FW	2014–15	20	2	
Eudes Dagoulou	(Central African Republic)	FW	2014–16	63	13	
Ibrahim Amada	(Madagascar)	MF	2015–17	48	2	
Zakaria Haddouche	(Algeria)	MF	2015–18	86	15	
Mohamed Benyettou	(Algeria)	FW	2014–15	64	16	
Abdelkader Bedrane	(Algeria)	DF	2016–19	95	10	
Ryad Kenniche	(Algeria)	DF	2015–17	43	3	
Miloud Rebiai	(Algeria)	DF	2015–19	111	7	
Farès Hachi	(Algeria)	DF	2015–16	45	0	
Hamza Aït Ouamar	(Algeria)	MF	2016–18	64	7	
Azongha Tembeng Abenego	(Cameroon)	MF	2016–17	24	2	
Mohamed Islam Bakir	(Algeria)	FW	2016–19	96	9	
Adel Bougueroua	(Algeria)	FW	2017	13	1	
Hamza Boulemdaïs	(Algeria)	FW	2016	12	0	
Sofiane Khedairia	(Algeria)	GK	2012–17, 2019–	192	0	
Houari Ferhani	(Algeria)	DF	2018–	41	1	
Abdelkrim Nemdil	(Algeria)	DF	2018–	43	0	
Hocine Laribi	(Algeria)	DF	2019–	24	2	
Saâdi Radouani	(Algeria)	DF	2018–	56	4	
Abdelhak Debbari	(Algeria)	DF	2019–	14	0	
Ibrahim Bekakchi	(Algeria)	DF	2019–	26	1	
Youcef Laouafi	(Algeria)	DF	2018–	36	1	
Akram Djahnit	(Algeria)	MF	2010–15, 2016–22	335	55	
Zakaria Draoui	(Algeria)	MF	2018–20	60	2	
Amir Karaoui	(Algeria)	MF	2011–14, 2018–22	200	12	
Abderrahim Deghmoum	(Algeria)	MF	2017–22	103	9	
Ahmed Kendouci	(Algeria)	MF	2018–22	120	31	
Habib Bouguelmouna	(Algeria)	FW	2018–20	32	16	
Malick Touré	(Mali)	FW	2019–21	34	10	
Ismaïl Saïdi	(Algeria)	FW	2015–18, 2019–21	61	6	
Yasser Berbache	(Algeria)	FW	2015–16, 2019–21	35	7	
Houssam Ghacha	(Algeria)	FW	2018–21	92	23	
Ishak Talal Boussouf	(Algeria)	FW	2019–20	10	2	

Nationalities are indicated by the corresponding FIFA country code.

== List of All-time appearances ==
This List of All-time appearances for ES Sétif contains football players who have played for ES Sétif and have managed to accrue 100 or more appearances.

Bold Still playing competitive football in ES Sétif. (Note: Since 2000–01 season the statistics of all the games, Statistics correct as of game against JS Saoura on July 15, 2023)

#	Name	Position	League	Cup	Others^{1}	Africa^{2}	Arab^{3}	TOTAL
1	(Algeria) Akram Djahnit	MF	236	31	2	62	4	335
2	(Algeria) Sofiane Khedairia	GK	190	19	3	52	0	264
3	(Algeria) Mourad Delhoum	MF	160	26	1	38	11	216
4	(Algeria) Amir Karaoui	MF	153	14	1	29	3	200
5	(Algeria) Abdelmoumene Djabou	MF	143	23	1	24	3	194
6	(Algeria) Abdelmalek Ziaya	FW	125	15	0	29	24	193
7	(Algeria) Lazhar Hadj Aïssa	MF	137	21	0	24	9	191
8	(Algeria) Mohamed Khoutir Ziti	DF	134	10	1	29	0	174
9	(Algeria) Abdelkader Laifaoui	DF	89	13	0	32	15	168
10	(Algeria) Farouk Belkaid	MF	115	16	0	28	2	161
11	(Algeria) Mohamed Yekhlef	DF	116	11	0	26	8	161
12	(Algeria) Slimane Raho	DF	108	7	0	22	15	152
13	(Algeria) Khaled Lemmouchia	MF	97	11	1	24	17	150
14	(Algeria) Smail Diss	DF	85	13	0	29	4	131
15	(Algeria) Ahmed Kendouci	MF	92	5	1	22	0	120
16	(Algeria) Lamouri Djediat	MF	68	8	1	15	19	111
17	(Algeria) Hocine Metref	MF	68	10	0	28	4	110
18	(Algeria) Abderrahim Deghmoum	MF	82	1	1	19	0	103
18	(Algeria) Rachid Nadji	FW	77	8	1	17	0	103

^{1} ^{Includes the Super Cup and League Cup.} ^{2} ^{Includes the Cup Winners' Cup, Confederation Cup, Champions League, CAF Super Cup and FIFA Club World Cup.} ^{3} ^{Includes the Champions League and UAFA Club Cup.}

== Players from ES Sétif to Europe ==
Player	Pos	Club	League	Transfer fee	Source
(Ivory Coast) Serey Dié	DF	Sion	(Switzerland) Swiss Super League	Free transfer	
(Algeria) Aïssa Boudechicha	DF	Girondins de Bordeaux	(France) Ligue 1	50,000 €	
(Algeria) Ishak Talal Boussouf	FW	Lommel	(Belgium) Belgian First Division B	900,000 €	
(Algeria) Mohamed El Amine Amoura	FW	FC Lugano	(Switzerland) Swiss Super League		
(Algeria) Houssam Ghacha	FW	Antalyaspor	(Turkey) Süper Lig	Free transfer	

== Award winners ==
(Whilst playing for ES Sétif)

Top goalscorers in Algerian Ligue 1

- (Algeria) Mohamed Griche (21 goals) – 1975–76
- (Algeria) Isâad Bourahli (16 goals) – 2000–01

Algerian professional football awards Player of the Year

- (Algeria) Mourad Delhoum – 2012–13
- (Algeria) Toufik Zerara – 2014–15

Algerian professional football awards Goalkeeper of the Year

- (Algeria) Sofiane Khedairia – 2014–15

Algerian professional football awards Manager of the Year

- (Algeria) Azzedine Aït Djoudi – 2008–09
- (France) Hubert Velud – 2012–13
- (Algeria) Kheïreddine Madoui – 2014–15
