= 2007 Algerian Super Cup =

- Stade du 5 Juillet hosted the match
ES Sétif	MC Alger
Ligue 1	Algerian Cup
0	4
- Date: 1 November 2007
- Venue: Stade 5 Juillet 1962, Algiers
- Referee: Aouaz Trabelsi
- Attendance: 50.000

The 2007 Algerian Super Cup is the 6th edition of Algerian Super Cup, a football match contested by the winners of the Championnat National and 2006–07 Algerian Cup competitions. The match was played on 1 November 2007 at Stade 5 Juillet 1962 in Algiers. Algerian Cup winners MC Alger defeated Championnat National winners ES Sétif with a score of 4-0.

The Cup was scheduled for 2008, 2009, and 2010 but was canceled each year. It was next contested in 2013.

== Match details ==
1 November 2007
14:30

ES Sétif	0–4	MC Alger
	Report	6', 58' Younès; 51' Belghomari; 54' Badji

Stade 5 Juillet 1962, Algiers
Attendance: 5.000
Referee: Aouaz Trabelsi (Tunisia)

GK	1	(Algeria) Abderaouf Natèche
DF	4	(Algeria) Abdelkader Laïfaoui		(substituted off) 36'
DF	3	(Algeria) Riad Benchadi	(yellow card) 35' (c)
DF	25	(Algeria) Hamza Zeddam
DF	27	(Algeria) Mohamed Yekhlef	(yellow card) 70'
MF	18	(Algeria) Ali Moumen
MF	8	(Algeria) Khaled Lemmouchia	(yellow card) 16'
MF	14	(Algeria) Lamouri Djediat
MF	13	(Algeria) Mourad Delhoum		(substituted off) 54'
FW	15	(Algeria) Farid Touil		(substituted off) 76'
FW	9	(Algeria) Abdelmalek Ziaya
Substitutes :
MF	23	(Algeria) Abdelmoumene Djabou		(substituted on) 54'
DF	5	(Algeria) Adel Maïza	(yellow card) 67'	(substituted on) 36'
FW	12	(Algeria) Farès Mecheri		(substituted on) 76'
Manager :
(Algeria) Noureddine Saâdi

GK	26	(Algeria) Mohamed Reda Ouamane
LB	15	(Algeria) Réda Babouche
CB	18	(Algeria) Farouk Belkaïd	(yellow card) 79'
CB	16	(Algeria) Samir Galoul
RB	2	(Algeria) Larbi Hosni
MF	35	(Algeria) Karim Kaddour
MF	23	(Algeria) Hamza Koudri	(yellow card) 36'	(substituted off) 76'
MF	8	(Algeria) Fayçal Badji		(substituted off) 68' (c)
RW	19	(Algeria) Hadj Bouguèche
FW	14	(Algeria) Safi Belghomari		(substituted off) 60'
LW	29	(Algeria) Sofiane Younès
Substitutes :
	0	(Algeria) Khelloufi		(substituted on) 68'
MF	0	(Algeria) Belkheir		(substituted on) 76'
FW	17	(Mali) Rafan Sidibé		(substituted on) 60'
Manager :
(Italy) Enrico Fabbro

MATCH OFFICIALS

- Assistant referees:
  - Nacer Abdennebi (Egypt)
  - Fouad Magherbi (Libya)
- Fourth official:
