= Khaled Lemmouchia =

Algerian footballer (born 1981)

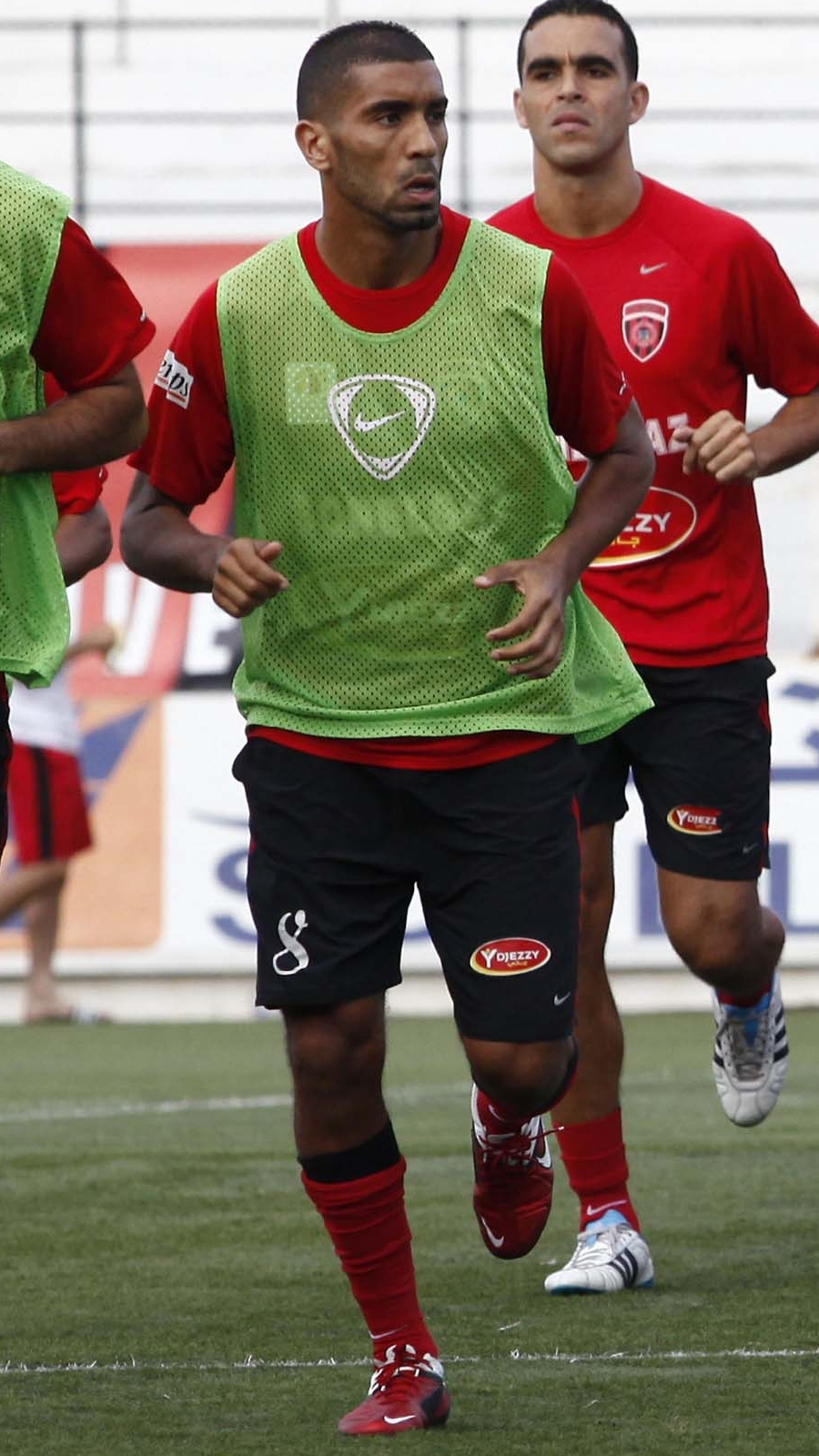
- Lemmouchia with USM Alger in 2011

Personal information
- Date of birth: 29 May 1981 (age 45)
- Place of birth: Givors, France
- Height: 1.77 m (5 ft 10 in)
- Position: Midfielder

Team information
- Current team: USM Alger (assistant coach)

Youth career
- 1996–2001: Lyon

Senior career*
Years	Team	Apps	(Gls)
2001–2002	Moulins	-	(-)
2002–2006	Lyon Duchère	61	(12)
2006–2011	ES Sétif	95	(0)
2011–2012	USM Alger	27	(1)
2012–2013	Club Africain	12	(0)
2015–2016	MC Oran	20	(0)

International career^{‡}
2000	Algeria U20	2	(0)
2008–2013	Algeria	27	(0)
2010–2011	Algeria A'	9	(0)

Managerial career
- 2022: Olympique de Médéa (assistant)
- 2022: ES Sétif (assistant)
- 2026-: USM Alger (assistant)
- * Club domestic league appearances and goals as of 21:00, 16 August 2015 (EST) ‡ National team caps and goals as of 21:00, 16 August 2015 (EST)

Khaled Lemmouchia (Arabic: خالد لموشية; born 6 December 1981) is a former professional footballer. He played primarily as a defensive midfielder. Born in France, he represented Algeria at international level.

Lemmouchia is a former Algerian youth international having played briefly for the under-20 team during the qualification process for the 2001 African Youth Championship. In February 2008, Lemmouchia was called up to the senior team for the first time for a training camp held in Paris. and would go on to make his debut on 31 May 2008 in a 2010 FIFA World Cup qualifying match against Senegal. He featured for Algeria at the 2010 Africa Cup of Nations and the 2011 African Championship of Nations. As of August 2012, he has won 22 international caps.

== Club career ==
Born in Givors, Rhône, Lemmouchia started his career at the age of 16 when he joined the Olympique Lyonnais academy, despite receiving interest from almost every club in France. He worked his way into the reserve squad. However, when his amateur contract expired he was not offered a professional deal and signed with amateur-club AS Moulins. A year later, he would join another amateur side, this time AS Lyon Duchère where he would spend the next 4 seasons. In the summer of 2006, he quit AS Lyon Duchère and signed his first professional contract with Algerian side ES Setif.

After joining ES Setif, Lemmouchia quickly became an important team member. In his first season, he led the team to the league title as well as the Arab Champions League title.

On 29 July 2011, Lemmouchia signed a one-year contract with USM Alger. He made 27 appearances, scoring 1 goal, helping the club to a third-place finish in the 2011–12 Algerian Ligue Professionnelle 1 and a spot in the 2013 CAF Confederation Cup.

On 13 August 2012, Lemmouchia traveled to Tunis to negotiate a contract with Tunisian side Club Africain. On 22 August, he signed a one-year contract with the club.

== International career ==
Whilst Lemmouchia was a youth player for Lyon he was called up by the France Under-17, but Lemmouchia rejected the call-up and opted to play for his country of origin Algeria instead. Lemmouchia was called up to play for the Algerian Under-20 squad in 2000 for the 2001 African Youth Championship qualifiers. Lemmouchia played his first under-20 game against Libya in Algiers which they won 1–0. In his second and final game for the under-20's, the team was required to win the game otherwise their hopes of qualifying would be over. The team managed a 2–2 draw in the second leg of the game against Ghana, which ended their hopes of qualifying for the 2001 African Youth Championship, that was to be hosted in Ethiopia.

On 6 February 2008, Lemmouchia was called up by Saâdane to a training camp held in Paris, France in preparation for the upcoming FIFA World Cup 2010 qualifiers. Lemmouchia began his senior international career for Algeria away on 31 May 2008 as a starter against Senegal in the first game of the FIFA World Cup 2010 qualifiers.

Lemmouchia was one of the players that were injured during an attack by Egyptians on the coach that was carrying the Algerian team; he stated that he felt disappointed that the game went ahead as the players feared more attacks.

== Career statistics ==
=== Club ===
As of 29 January 2024

Club	Season	League			Cup		Continental		Other		Total	
Club	Season	Division	Apps	Goals	Apps	Goals	Apps	Goals	Apps	Goals	Apps	Goals
ES Sétif	2006–07	Ligue 1	16	0	2	0	—		—		18	0
ES Sétif	2007–08	Ligue 1	24	0	—		3 (Note: All appearance(s) in Champions League)	0	14 (Note: one appearance in Algerian Super Cup, thirteen appearances in Arab Champions League)	0	41	0
ES Sétif	2008–09	Ligue 1	16	0	1	0	2 (Note: All appearance(s) in CAF Confederation Cup)	0	4 (Note: All appearance(s) in Arab Champions League)	0	23	0
ES Sétif	2009–10	Ligue 1	22	0	4	0	13 (Note: eight appearances in CAF Confederation Cup, five appearances in CAF Champions League)	0	—		39	0
ES Sétif	2010–11	Ligue 1	19	0	4	0	6	0	—		29	0
Total			97	0	11	0	24	0	18	0	150	0
USM Alger	2011–12	Ligue 1	27	1	3	0	—		—		30	1
Career total			0	0	0	0	0	0	0	0	0	0

== Honours ==
ES Sétif

- Algerian Championnat National: 2006–07, 2008–09, runner-up 2009–10
- Arab Champions League: 2006–07, 2007–08
- North African Cup of Champions: 2009
- Algerian Cup: 2009–10
- North African Super Cup: 2010
- North African Cup Winners Cup: 2010
- CAF Confederation Cup runner-up: 2009
