= Algeria national youth football team =

National association football teams

Algeria
- Nickname(s): الأفنــاك (Fennec foxes) الخُضر (The Greens) الخضرة (The Green One) محاربو الصحراء (The Desert Warriors)
- Association: Algerian Football Federation
- Other affiliation: UAFA (Arab Nations)
- Confederation: CAF (Africa)
- Sub-confederation: UNAF (North Africa)
- Head coach: Mohamed Lcete (U-20); Rezki Remane (U-17)
- FIFA code: ALG
First colours	Second colours

The Algeria national youth football team are the national under-23, under-20 and under-17 football teams of Algeria and are controlled by the Algerian Football Federation. The youth teams of Algeria participate in tournaments sanctioned by both FIFA and CAF. They also participate in world, regional, and local international tournaments.

== Algeria national under-23 squad ==
COACH: Rafik Saifi

In 2015, the team earned a spot in the 2016 Summer Olympics. They finished fourteenth at the games.

== Algeria national under-20 squad ==
COACH: Razik Nedder

== Algeria national under-17 squad ==
COACH: Amine Ghimouz
