= Ahmed Talbi =

Moroccan footballer

Personal information
- Full name: Ahmed Talbi
- Date of birth: August 28, 1981 (age 45)
- Place of birth: Berkane, Morocco
- Height: 1.82 m (5 ft 11 1/2 in)
- Position: Attacking midfielder

Team information
- Current team: FC Schaerbeek

Youth career
- Renaissance de Berkane

Senior career*
Years	Team	Apps	(Gls)
2002–2005	Renaissance de Berkane		
2005–2009	Wydad Casablanca		
2009–2011	Moghreb Tétouan		
2012–2015	Renaissance de Berkane		
2015-2018	Sporting Brussel		
2018-2019	Renaissance de Berkane		
2019-	FC Schaerbeek		
- * Club domestic league appearances and goals as of April 16, 2009 ‡ National team caps and goals as of October 17, 2008

Ahmed Talbi is a Moroccan footballer. As of 2005, he played for Wydad Casablanca. As of 2013, he was a starting player for Renaissance de Berkane.
