= Ali Mechiche =

Algerian football manager

Personal information
- Date of birth: 29 March 1958 (age 68)

Managerial career
- Years: Team
- 2009: ES Sétif
- 2009: ES Sétif (assistant)
- 2009: ES Sétif
- 2013: JS Saoura
- 2015: USM Bel Abbès
- 2015: JSM Skikda
- 2017: CA Batna
- 2018: MC El Eulma (technical director)
- 2018: MC El Eulma
- 2018–2019: MC El Eulma (technical director)
- 2019: MC El Eulma
- 2019–: MC El Eulma (technical director)

Ali Mechiche (born 29 March 1958) is an Algerian football manager.
