= Lazhar Hadj Aïssa =

Algerian footballer (born 1984)

Personal information
- Full name: Lazhar Hadj Aïssa
- Date of birth: 23 March 1984 (age 42)
- Place of birth: Batna, Algeria
- Height: 1.75 m (5 ft 9 in)
- Position: Midfielder

Team information
- Current team: NRB Teleghma
- Number: 9

Youth career
- 1994–2003: MSP Batna

Senior career*
Years	Team	Apps	(Gls)
2003–2004	MSP Batna	–	(–)
2004–2009	ES Sétif	160	(16)
2011–2012	Qadsia	11	(5)
2012	Al Sharjah SC	0	(0)
2013	MC Alger	0	(0)
2014	Al Safa FC	0	(0)
2014–2015	ES Sétif	1	(0)
2015–2016	CRB Aïn Fakroun	1	(0)
2016–2018	CA Batna	12	(0)
2018–2022	MSP Batna	40	(0)
2022–2023	NRB Teleghma	9	(2)
2023–	AB Merouana		

International career^{‡}
2005	Algeria U23	8	(0)
2005–2011	Algeria	17	(1)
- * Club domestic league appearances and goals as of 7 May 2022 ‡ National team caps and goals as of 00:00, 17 March 2012 (UTC)

Lazhar Hadj Aïssa (Arabic: لزهر الحاج عيسى; born 23 March 1984 in Batna) is an Algerian professional football player who currently plays as an attacking midfielder for NRB Teleghma in the Algerian Ligue 2.

== Personal ==
Hadj Aïssa is nicknamed "Baggio" because of his hair and his style of play's similarity to Italian legend Roberto Baggio.

== Club career ==
=== MSP Batna ===
Hadj Aïssa started his playing career in 1994 with his hometown club MSP Batna, starting with the youth sides and progressing to become one of the most talented players at the club. In the 2003–2004 season, he made his full debut for the club in the Algerian Second Division, with his performances on the pitch attracting loads of interest from various domestic clubs.

=== ES Sétif ===
In the summer of 2004, Hadj Aïssa joined ES Sétif and made 25 appearances, scoring 2 goals, in his first season. The following season, he made 28 appearances and scored 5 goals.

On 10 June 2006, on the recommendation of Zinedine Zidane, Hadj Aïssa was offered a trial with Spanish club Real Madrid.

In his third season with the club, Hadj Aïssa helped ES Sétif win the 2006–2007 Algerian League, their first league title since 1987. He also played a crucial role in the team's triumph in the 2006–2007 edition of the Arab Champions League and was named the Best Player of the competition.

The following season, he helped the club win the 2007–08 Arab Champions League. However, on the domestic front, the club could only manage a third-place finish.

On 11 July 2008, it was announced that he was going on trial with Portuguese club Benfica. However, days later, he announced that he would not join the club because they were looking to loan him out. Two weeks later, he traveled to Ukraine and signed with Metalist Kharkov but the club would not match the price tag set by ES Sétif president Abdelhakim Serrar.

On 9 August 2009, Hadj Aïssa signed with Saudi Arabian club Al-Ettifaq. However, a few days later, the contract was canceled after Al-Ettifaq faced financial difficulties and failed to pay the transfer fee to ES Sétif.

On 24 August 2009, it was announced that he was going on trial with English Premier League club Portsmouth. He trained with the club until the end of the transfer window, on 31 September but did not end up signing because of work permit issues. Portsmouth had been keen on keeping him, but due to the administrative issues they were unable to do so.

In 2010, he captained his side in the final of the Algerian Cup, in which they won 3–0.

=== Qadsia SC ===
On 15 August 2011, Hadj Aïssa signed a one-year contract with Kuwaiti Premier League club Qadsia SC.

== Statistics ==
Club performance			League		Cup		Continental		Continental		Total	
Season	Club	League	Apps	Goals	Apps	Goals	Apps	Goals	Apps	Goals	Apps	Goals
Algeria			League		Algerian Cup		Africa		Arab		Total	
2003–04	MSP Batna	Ligue 2	-	-	-		-		-	-	-	-
2004–05	ES Sétif	Ligue 1	25	2	1	0	-		-	-	26	2
2005–06	ES Sétif	Ligue 1	28	5	4	1	-		-	-	32	6
2006–07	ES Sétif	Ligue 1	23	1	2	0	-		-	-	25	1
2007–08	ES Sétif	Ligue 1	10	1	1	0	3	1	-	-	14	2
2008–09	ES Sétif	Ligue 1	19	0	4	0	6	0	-	-	29	0
2009–10	ES Sétif	Ligue 1	22	5	5	0	11	3	-	-	27	5
2010–11	ES Sétif	Ligue 1	10	2	4	0	4	3	-		14	2
Kuwait			League		Emir Cup		Asia		Arab		Total	
2011–12	Qadsia SC	Kuwaiti Premier League	7	2	-	-	-	-	-		7	2
Total	Algeria		137	16	21	1	-	-	-		146	16
Total	Kuwait		7	2	-	-	-	-	-		7	2
Career total			144	8	21	1	-	-	-	-	153	18

== Honours ==
=== Club ===
ES Sétif

- Algerian Championnat National: 2006–07, 2008–09, Runner-up 2009–10
- North African Cup of Champions: 2009
- Algerian Cup: 2009–10
- North African Super Cup: 2010
- North African Cup Winners Cup: 2010
- Arab Champions League: 2006–07, 2007–08
- CAF Confederation Cup: Runner-up 2008–09

Qadsia SC

- Kuwait Emir Cup: 2011–12
- Kuwaiti Premier League: 2011–12

=== Awards ===
- Best player of the Arab Champions League in 2007
- Best young player of the Algerian League in 2005
