= 2007–08 Arab Champions League =

دوري أبطال العرب 2007–08

Tournament details
- Dates: 12 September 2007 – 22 May 2008
- Teams: 32 (from 1 association)

Final positions
- Champions: (Algeria) ES Sétif (2nd title)
- Runners-up: (Morocco) Wydad Casablanca

Tournament statistics
- Matches played: 75
- Goals scored: 192 (2.56 per match)
- Top scorer: (Saudi Arabia) Essa Al-Mehyani (8 goals)
- Best player: (Algeria) Lamouri Djediat

The 5th Edition of the Arab Champions League was played in the 2007–08 season.

== Format ==
- Each federation enter with (1~2) teams from their top Leagues

– The teams must be one of the top 5 teams in the latest season, or Cup Champions/Runners-up.

- The Number of teams of each federation enters based on the previous editions results of the Arab Champions League
- The official sponsor ART can choose the rest teams to complete the 32 teams, so it may can reach 3 teams from one country

– It's not necessary to be one of the top 5 teams.

- (Algeria) Entente Sportive de Sétif entered automatically as 2006–07 Champion.

== Participating teams ==
32 clubs will be competing from the following countries.

=== Asia ===
Bahrain (1)	Bahrein Riffa Club (2006–07 Bahraini Premier League Runners-up)
Iraq (2)	Najaf FC (Iraqi Premier League 2006-07 3rd Place); Al-Talaba (Iraqi Premier League 2006-07 4th Place)
Jordan (2)	Al-Wihdat (2006–07 Jordan League Champions); Al-Faisaly (2006–07 Jordan League Runners-up)
Kuwait (2)	Kazma Sporting Club (2006–07 Kuwaiti Premier League Champions); Al-Arabi (2006–07 Kuwaiti Premier League 6th Place)
Lebanon (1)	Al-Ansar (2006–07 Lebanese Premier League Champions)
Qatar (0)	Withdraw this season
Oman (1)	Al-Oruba (2006-07 Omani League Runners-up)
Palestine (1)	Shabab Rafah (Representing Palestine)
Saudi Arabia (2)	Al-Wahda Mecca (2006–07 Saudi Arabia Premier League 3rd Place); Al-Shabab (2006–07 Saudi Arabia Premier League 4th Place)
Syria (2)	Al-Taliya (2006–07 Syrian League 3rd Place); Al-Majd (2006–07 Syrian League 4th Place)
UAE (1)	Al-Shaab (2006–07 UAE League 5th Place)
Yemen (1)	Al-Ahli San'a (2006–07 Yemeni League Champions)

=== Africa ===
Algeria (3)	ES Sétif (2006–07 Algerian Championnat National Champions); USM Alger (2006–07 Algerian Championnat National 4th Place); MC Oran (2006–07 Algerian Championnat National 6th Place)
Comoros (1)	Chirazienne (2006–07 Comoros Cup Winners)
Djibouti (1)	CDE Colas (Representing Djibouti)
Egypt (2)	Tala'ea El-Gaish (2006–07 Egyptian Premier League 4th Place); El-Masry (2006–07 Egyptian Premier League 10th Place)
Libya (1)	Al-Ittihad Tripoli (2006–07 Libyan Premier League Champions)
Mauritania (1)	ASC Mauritel (2006–07 Mauritanean Premier League Champions)
Morocco (3)	Moghreb Athletic Tétouan (2006–07 GNF 1 3rd Place); Wydad Casablanca (2006–07 GNF 1 4th Place); Raja Casablanca (2006–07 GNF 1 11th Place)
Somalia (0)	Withdraw this season (Elman FC withdraw)
Sudan (2)	Al-Hilal Club (2006 Sudan Premier League Champions); Al-Merrikh SC (2006 Sudan Premier League Runners-up)
Tunisia (2)	Union Sportive Monastirienne (2006–07 Tunisian Ligue Professionnelle 1 4th Place); Club Athletique Bizertin (2006–07 Tunisian Ligue Professionnelle 1 12th Place)

== System ==
- 32 teams: Knock out stage
- 16 teams: Knock out stage
- 8 teams: Groups Stage
- Semifinals and final: Knock out stage

== Awards ==
- Champions: $1,500,000
- Runner-up: $1,000,000
- Round 4: $400,000
- Round 8: $300,000
- Round 16: $60,000
- Round 32: $30,000

== Round 32 ==
32 teams play home and away matches as Knock out stage.

Team 1	Agg.	Team 2	1st leg	2nd leg
Moghreb Athletic Tétouan (Morocco)	1–4	(Jordan) Al-Wihdat	0–4	1–0
Al-Talaba (Iraq)	0–4	(Algeria) USM Alger	0–2	0–2
Al-Merrikh SC (Sudan)	5–1	(Bahrain) Bahrein Riffa Club	2–0	3–1
ASC Mauritel (Mauritania)	1–4	(Algeria) ES Sétif	1–1	0–3
Al-Hilal Club (Sudan)	4–4(a)	(Syria) Al-Majd	3–2	1–2
CDE Colas (Djibouti)	0–19	(Saudi Arabia) Al-Wahda Mecca	0–8	0–11
Kazma Sporting Club (Kuwait)	1–2	(Morocco) Wydad Casablanca	0–1	1–1
Chirazienne (Comoros)	0–9	(Iraq) Najaf FC	0–8	0–1
El-Masry (Egypt)	0–1	(Syria) Al-Taliya	0–1	0–0
Al-Ahli San'a (Yemen)	1–4	(Libya) Al-Ittihad Tripoli	0–0	1–4
MC Oran (Algeria)	0–3	(Kuwait) Al-Arabi	0–1	0–2
Al-Ansar (Lebanon)	2–3	(Egypt) Tala'ea El-Gaish	1–1	1–2
Club Athletic Bizertin (Tunisia)	3–3 (4–2)	(Saudi Arabia) Al-Shabab	1–2	2–1
Al-Oruba (Oman)	1–1 (a)	(Tunisia) Union Sportive Monastir	0–0	1–1
Al-Shaab (United Arab Emirates)	2–4	(Jordan) Al-Faisaly	0–2	2–2
Shabab Rafah (Palestine)	(w/o) ^{1}	(Morocco) Raja Casablanca	–	–

^{1} (Palestine) Shabab Rafah withdrew.

=== Match dates ===
- The first legs on 12 and 17/18 September 2007
- The second legs on 1/2 October 2007

== Round of 16 ==
16 teams play home and away matches as knock out stage.

Team 1	Agg.	Team 2	1st leg	2nd leg
Al-Ittihad Tripoli (Libya)	1–3	(Syria) Al-Majd	1–1	0–2
Al-Wahda Mecca (Saudi Arabia)	2–4	(Algeria) ES Sétif	1–1	1–3
Al-Oruba (Oman)	3–7	(Morocco) Wydad Casablanca	2–3	1–4
Al-Merrikh (Sudan)	3–5	(Morocco) Raja Casablanca	2–2	1–3
Najaf FC (Iraq)	0–3	(Syria) Al-Taliya	0–3	0–0
Club Athletic Bizertin (Tunisia)	3–4	(Jordan) Al-Faisaly	1–1	2–3
Al-Wihdat (Jordan)	1–2	(Egypt) Tala'ea El-Gaish	0–0	1–2
Al-Arabi (Kuwait)	(w/o)	(Algeria) USM Alger	3–2	Sus^{1}

^{1} Al-Arabi Disqualified, Kuwait have been indefinitely suspended from international football competitions.

=== Matches Dates ===
- The first legs on 22 /5 November 2007
- The second legs on 6 /15 November 2007

== Quarter-finals ==
8 teams play home and away matches in 2 Groups, 4 teams in each group.
Group winners and runners-up qualify to the semifinals.

=== Group A ===
Team	Pld	W	D	L	GF	GA	GD	Pts
(Algeria) ES Sétif	6	3	2	1	10	4	+6	11
(Jordan) Al-Faisaly	6	2	3	1	9	7	+2	9
(Morocco) Raja Casablanca	6	1	4	1	3	4	−1	7
(Syria) Al-Majd	6	0	3	3	5	12	−7	3

28 November 2007

Raja Casablanca (Morocco)	0–0	(Jordan) Al-Faisaly

Stade Mohamed V, Casablanca
Referee: A.Jadidi (Tunisia)
28 November 2007

ES Sétif (Algeria)	1–1	(Syria) Al-Majd
Djediat 51'		Rafe 37'

Stade 8 Mai 1945, Sétif
Referee: J.Ambia (Libya)

11 December 2007

Al-Faisaly (Jordan)	3–1	(Syria) Al-Majd
Al-Sheikh 47'; Al-Shboul 65'; Abu Keshek 92'		Rafe 56'

Amman International Stadium, Amman
12 December 2007

ES Sétif (Algeria)	2–0	(Morocco) Raja Casablanca
Maïza 31'; Touil 88'

Stade 8 Mai 1945, Setif
Referee: T.Nadjm (Lebanon)

25 December 2007

Al-Majd (Syria)	1–1	(Morocco) Raja Casablanca
Al Zeno 28'		Aïni 93'

Abbasiyyin Damascus Stadium, Damascus
26 December 2007

Al-Faisaly (Jordan)	1–1	(Algeria) ES Sétif
Lafi 39'		Touil 63'

Amman International Stadium, Amman

19 February 2008

Al-Majd (Syria)	2–3	(Jordan) Al-Faisaly
Rafe 50'; Masaes 56'		Farhan 27', 58'; Lafi 90'

Abbasiyyin Damascus Stadium, Damascus
20 February 2008

Raja Casablanca (Morocco)	1–0	(Algeria) ES Sétif
Senghor 60'

Stade Mohamed V, Casablanca

5 March 2008

Raja Casablanca (Morocco)	0–0	(Syria) Al-Majd

Stade Mohamed V, Casablanca
5 March 2008

ES Sétif (Algeria)	2–1	(Jordan) Al-Faisaly
Touil 89'; Adiko 90+5'		Lafi 85'

Stade 8 Mai 1945, Setif

12 March 2008

Al-Faisaly (Jordan)	1–1	(Morocco) Raja Casablanca
Abdul-Amir 25'		Cire 13'

18 March 2008

Al-Majd (Syria)	0–4	(Algeria) ES Sétif
		Adiko 20'; Laïfaoui 45'; Djediat 66', 77'

=== Group B ===
Team	Pld	W	D	L	GF	GA	GD	Pts
(Morocco) Wydad Casablanca	6	3	1	2	11	6	+5	10
(Egypt) Tala'ea El-Gaish	6	2	2	2	3	5	−2	8
(Algeria) USM Alger	6	2	2	2	5	5	0	8
(Syria) Al-Taliya	6	2	1	3	4	7	−3	7

27 November 2007

Tala'ea El-Gaish (Egypt)	1–2	(Syria) Al-Taliya
Masaoud 82'		Aboud 36'; Tatan 88'

Military Academy Stadium, Cairo
Referee: J.Mahmoud (Bahrain)
28 November 2007

USM Alger (Algeria)	2–1	(Morocco) Wydad Casablanca
Louissi 58' (o.g.); Doucoure 81'		Madihi 54'

Omar Hammadi Stadium, Algiers
Referee: S.Mahmoud (Jordan)

10 December 2007

Tala'ea El-Gaish (Egypt)	0–0	(Algeria) USM Alger

Cairo Military Academy Stadium, Cairo
Referee: M.Omar (United Arab Emirates)
12 December 2007

Wydad Casablanca (Morocco)	3–1	(Syria) Al-Taliya
Doulyazal 38'; Jouaya 65'; Bidoudane 70'		Sulaiman 9'

Stade Mohamed V, Casablanca

25 December 2007

Al-Taliya (Syria)	0–0	(Algeria) USM Alger

Al Baladi Al Talyia Nahia Syria
26 December 2007

Wydad Casablanca (Morocco)	3–0	(Egypt) Tala'ea El-Gaish
Abderrahim Saadi 44'; Hamza Yacef 64'; Abderrazak Sakim 70'

Stade Mohamed V, Casablanca

18 February 2008

USM Alger (Algeria)	0–1	(Egypt) Tala'ea El-Gaish
		Mamdouh Abd El-Haee 77'

Omar Hammadi Stadium, Algiers
19 February 2008

Al-Taliya (Syria)	0–2	(Morocco) Wydad Casablanca
		Sadio Sow 35'; Abderrazak Sakim 92'

Mohamed V, Casablanca

3 March 2008

USM Alger (Algeria)	0–1	(Syria) Al-Taliya

Omar Hammadi Stadium, Algiers
3 March 2008

Tala'ea El-Gaish (Egypt)	0–0	(Morocco) Wydad Casablanca

Cairo Military Academy Stadium, Cairo

18 March 2008

Al-Taliya (Syria)	0–1	(Egypt) Tala'ea El-Gaish
		Arko 75'

19 March 2008

Wydad Casablanca (Morocco)	2–3	(Algeria) USM Alger
Oumansour 25'; Sow 88'		Moncharé 12'; Ammour 78'; Doucoure 81'

== Semi-Finals ==
14 April 2008

Al-Faisaly (Jordan)	1–2	(Morocco) Wydad Casablanca
El Adoua 35' (o.g.)		Bidoudane 4'; Talbi 74'

Amman International Stadium, Amman
30 April 2008

Wydad Casablanca (Morocco)	0–0	(Jordan) Al-Faisaly

Stade Mohamed V, Casablanca

15 April 2008

Tala'ea El-Gaish (Egypt)	2–1	(Algeria) ES Setif
Abdelali 25', 53'		Mecheri 80'

Cairo Military Academy Stadium, Cairo
1 May 2008

ES Setif (Algeria)	1–0	(Egypt) Tala'ea El-Gaish
Ziaya 65'

Stade 8 Mai 1945, Sétif

== Final ==
9 May 2008

Wydad Casablanca (Morocco)	0–1	(Algeria) ES Setif
		Touil 80'

Stade Mohamed V, Casablanca
Attendance: 54,000
Referee: Aouaz Trabelsi (Tunisia)
22 May 2008

ES Sétif (Algeria)	1–0	(Morocco) Wydad Casablanca
Ziaya 30'

Mustapha Tchaker Stadium, Blida
Attendance: 35,000
Referee: Saad Kamil Al-Fadhli (Kuwait)

== Winners ==
Arab Champions League 2007–08
Winners

ES Sétif
Second Title

== Top scorers ==
Last updated: 22 May 2008.

Pos.	Scorer	Goals	Club
1.	(Saudi Arabia) Essa Al-Mehyani	8	(Saudi Arabia) Al-Wahda Mecca
2.	(Syria) Raja Rafe	6	(Syria) Al-Majd
3.	(Algeria) Lamouri Djediat	5	(Algeria) ES Setif
=	(Morocco) Mohamed Madihi	5	(Morocco) Wydad Casablanca
=	(Jordan) Fadi Lafi	5	(Jordan) Al-Faysali
