= Adel Maïza =

Algerian footballer (born 1983)

Personal information
- Full name: Adel Maïza
- Date of birth: March 18, 1983 (age 43)
- Place of birth: Annaba, Algeria
- Height: 1.85 m (6 ft 1 in)
- Position: Centre back

Senior career*
Years	Team	Apps	(Gls)
2003–2005	CS Constantine	24	(2)
2005–2008	ES Setif	72	(8)
2008–2009	Al-Ahli Jeddah	10	(0)
2009–2010	USM Annaba		
2010–2012	JSM Béjaïa	45	(4)
2012–2013	USM Alger	3	(0)
2013	JS Kabylie	9	(2)
2013–2014	CS Constantine	24	(2)
2014–2016	MC El Eulma	22	(1)
2016–	USM Annaba		

International career
2006–2009	Algeria	3	(0)
2010	Algeria A'	10	(2)
- * Club domestic league appearances and goals as of 14:10, 5 September 2019 (UTC)

Adel Maïza (Arabic: عادل معيزة; born March 18, 1983) is an Algerian retired football player who played as a defender for USM Annaba.

== Honours ==
=== Club ===
ES Sétif

- Algerian Ligue Professionnelle 1 (1): 2006-07
- Arab Champions League (2): 2006-07, 2007-08

Al Ahli Jeddah

- Gulf Club Champions Cup (1): 2008
