= Riad Benchadi =

Algerian football player (born 1978)

Personal information
- Full name: Riad Benchadi
- Date of birth: November 7, 1978 (age 48)
- Place of birth: Batna, Algeria
- Height: 1.79 m (5 ft 10 in)
- Position: Defender

Team information
- Current team: MCB EL MADHER

Senior career*
Years	Team	Apps	(Gls)
1999–2003	CA Batna	-	(-)
2003–2006	CA Bordj Bou Arreridj	58	(1)
2006–2014	ES Sétif	94	(2)
2014–2016	CRB Ain Fakroun	-	(-)
2017	MCB EL MADHER	-	(-)
- * Club domestic league appearances and goals as of December 1, 2017

Riad Benchadi (born November 7, 1978) is an Algerian football player who is currently playing for MCB EL MADHER in the Ligue Régional 2 'BATNA'.

== Personal ==
Born in Batna, Benchadi is originally from the town of Fesdis, Batna.

== Honours ==
- Won the Algerian Championnat National twice with ES Sétif in 2007 and 2009
- Won the Arab Champions League twice with ES Sétif in 2007 and 2008
- Won the North African Cup of Champions once with ES Sétif in 2009
- Won the Algerian Cup twice with ES Sétif in 2010 and 2012
- Won the North African Super Cup once with ES Sétif in 2010
- Won the North African Cup Winners Cup once with ES Sétif in 2010
- Finalist of the CAF Confederation Cup once with ES Sétif in 2009
