= Samir Hadjaoui =

Algerian footballer (1979–2021)

Personal information
- Date of birth: 16 February 1979
- Place of birth: Tlemcen, Algeria
- Date of death: 16 May 2021 (aged 42)
- Place of death: France
- Height: 1.86 m (6 ft 1 in)
- Position: Goalkeeper

Senior career*
Years	Team	Apps	(Gls)
1996–2002	WA Tlemcen		
2002–2005	ASO Chlef	62	(0)
2005–2006	CR Belouizdad	3	(0)
2006–2009	ES Sétif	65	(0)
2009–2010	JS Kabylie	31	(0)
2010–2011	WA Tlemcen	9	(0)
2011–2012	CS Constantine	1	(0)
2012–2013	Paradou AC	0	(0)

International career
2007	Algeria	3	(0)
- * Club domestic league appearances and goals

Samir Hadjaoui (16 February 1979 – 16 May 2021) was an Algerian footballer who played as a goalkeeper.

== Club career ==
Born in Tlemcen, Hadjaoui began his career with hometown club WA Tlemcen. He won two Algerian Cups and an Arab Cup with the side.

Having joined ASO Chlef in 2002, he won a third Algerian Cup.

Following a brief stint with CR Belouizdad he signed with ES Sétif. He contributed to two Algerian Championnat National titles and two Arab Champions League titles between 2006 and 2009.

He played four more seasons with JS Kabylie, WA Tlemcen, CS Constantine, and Paradou AC.

== International career ==
Hadjaoui made his debut for the Algeria national team in an African Cup of Nations qualifier against Cape Verde on 2 June 2007, coming on as a substitute for Yacine Bezzaz after the starting goalkeeper Lounès Gaouaoui received a red card. He made his first start for the team in a 4–3 friendly loss against Argentina in Barcelona's Nou Camp, facing a 20-year-old Lionel Messi.

== Death ==
Hadjaoui died on 16 May 2021 after a long illness.

== Honours ==
WA Tlemcen

- Algerian Cup: 1997–98, 2001–02
- Arab Club Champions Cup: 1998

ASO Chlef

- Algerian Cup: 2004–05

ES Sétif

- Arab Champions League: 2006–07, 2007–08
- Algerian Championnat National: 2006–07, 2008–09
