= Farid Touil =

Algerian footballer (born 1974)

Personal information
- Date of birth: 10 December 1974 (age 51)
- Place of birth: Constantine, Algeria
- Height: 1.84 m (6 ft 0 in)
- Position: Striker

Senior career*
Years	Team	Apps	(Gls)
1993–1999	MO Constantine		
1999–2004	US Chaouia		
2004–2006	USM Blida	27	(11)
2007–2008	ES Sétif		
2008	MC Alger		
2009–2011	CS Constantine		
- * Club domestic league appearances and goals as of February 1, 2008

Farid Touil (born 10 December 1974) is an Algerian former footballer who played in the Algerian Championnat National.

== Career ==
A center forward, Touil played for US Chaouia and ES Sétif before signing with MC Alger in July 2008. He finished his playing career with CS Constantine.

Touil scored the winning goal in the second leg of the 2006–07 Arab Champions League final. He also scored the winning goal in the first leg of the 2007–08 Arab Champions League final.

After he retired from playing, Touil became a member of ES Sétif's coaching staff.

== Honours ==
=== Club ===
- Winner of Arab Champions League twice with ES Sétif in 2007 and 2008
- Winner of Algerian League once in 2007 with ES Sétif
