= Mokhtar Megueni =

Algerian footballer (born 1989)

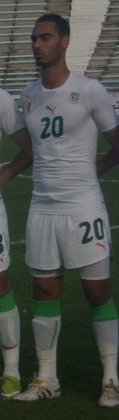

Personal information
- Date of birth: July 24, 1989 (age 37)
- Place of birth: Mascara, Algeria
- Height: 1.88 m (6 ft 2 in)
- Position: Defender

Senior career*
| Years | Team | Apps | (Gls) |
| 2007–2008 | USM Oran | - | (-) |
| 2008–2012 | ES Sétif | 25 | (1) |
| 2010–2011 | → MC Saïda (loan) | 15 | (0) |
| 2012–2013 | JSM Béjaïa | 3 | (0) |

International career^{‡}
| 2007–2008 | Algeria U20 | 4 | (0) |
| 2008 | Algeria U23 | 7 | (1) |
- * Club domestic league appearances and goals as of 00:00, June 27, 2012 (UTC) ‡ National team caps and goals as of 00:00, June 27, 2012 (UTC)

Mokhtar Megueni (born July 24, 1989) is a retired Algerian footballer.

== Club career ==
On July 19, 2010, Megueni was loaned out by ES Sétif to MC Saïda for one season.

== International career ==
In September 2007, Megueni was called up to the Algerian U20 National Team for the first edition of the Mediterranean Trophy held in Sicily, Italy. In 2008, he was a member of the U20 team that drew 0–0 with Mauritania in the preliminary round of the 2009 African Youth Championship.

In 2008, Megueni was called up to the Algerian Under-23 National Team for a five-day training camp in Algiers. Since then, he has been a regular member of the Under-23 team. On April 29, 2011, he scored his first goal for the Under-23 team, with a goal in the 20th minute in a 1–0 win over Niger.

== Honours ==
- ES Sétif
  - Algerian Cup: 2011–12
