= Ali Moumen =

Algerian footballer (born 1977)

Personal information
- Full name: Ali Moumen
- Date of birth: March 31, 1977 (age 49)
- Place of birth: Oran, Algeria
- Height: 1.75 m (5 ft 9 in)
- Position: Midfielder

Team information
- Current team: NA Hussein Dey

Senior career*
Years	Team	Apps	(Gls)
1995–2004	MC Oran	36	(20)
2004–2005	ASM Oran		
2005	USM Blida	11	(22)
2006–2007	MC Oran	39	(15)
2007–2008	ES Setif	17	(6)
2009	MC Saida	12	(5)
2009–	NA Hussein Dey		

International career^{‡}
2006–2007	Algeria	5	(0)
- * Club domestic league appearances and goals as of July 2009 ‡ National team caps and goals as of November 2009

Ali Moumen (born March 31, 1977) is an Algerian football player who is currently playing as a midfielder for NA Hussein Dey in the Algerian Championnat National.

== Club career ==
- 1995-2004 MC Oran
- 2004-2005 ASM Oran
- 2005-2006 USM Blida
- 2006-2007 MC Oran
- 2007-pres. ES Sétif

== Honours ==
- Won the Arab Champions League once with ES Sétif in 2008
- Won the Algerian Cup once with MC Oran in 1996
- Won the Algerian League Cup once with MC Oran in 1996
- Won the Arab Cup Winners Cup two times with MC Oran in 1997 and 1998
- Won the Arab Super Cup once with MC Oran in 1999
- Finalist of the Arab Champions League once with MC Oran in 2001
- Runner-up of the Algerian League three times with MC Oran in 1996, 1997 and 2000
- Finalist of the Algerian Cup twice with MC Oran in 1998 and 2002
- Has 2 caps for the Algerian National Team
