= Azzedine Benchaïra =

Algerian footballer (born 1978)

Personal information
- Date of birth: November 2, 1978 (age 47)
- Place of birth: Biskra, Algeria
- Position: Defender

Senior career*
Years	Team	Apps	(Gls)
1999–2003	US Biskra		
2003–2010	ES Sétif		
2010–	CA Bordj Bou Arreridj		
- * Club domestic league appearances and goals

Azzedine Benchaïra (born November 2, 1978) is an Algerian footballer who plays as a defender for CA Bordj Bou Arreridj in the Algerian Ligue Professionnelle 1.

== Honours ==
- Won the Algerian League twice with ES Sétif in 2007 and 2009
- Won the Arab Champions League twice with ES Sétif in 2007 and 2008
- Won the North African Cup of Champions once with ES Sétif in 2009
- Finalist of the CAF Confederation Cup once with ES Sétif in 2009
