= Abderaouf Natèche =

Algerian footballer (born 1982)

Personal information
- Full name: Abderaouf Natèche
- Date of birth: 16 October 1982 (age 44)
- Place of birth: El Harrach, Algeria
- Height: 1.79 m (5 ft 10 1/2 in)
- Position: Goalkeeper

Team information
- Current team: Olympique de Médéa

Youth career
- –: USM El Harrach
- –: IRB Sidi Aïssa

Senior career*
Years	Team	Apps	(Gls)
2002–2007	USM El Harrach		
2007–2008	ES Sétif		
2008–2009	USM Sétif		
2009–2012	NA Hussein Dey	20	(0)
2012–2014	CS Constantine	31	(0)
2014–2018	MC Oran	115	(0)
2018–2019	JS Saoura	24	(0)
2019–2020	Ohod	38	(0)
2020–2021	Al-Bukiryah	36	(0)
2022–	Olympique de Médéa	0	(0)
- * Club domestic league appearances and goals as of 24 February 2022

Abderaouf Natèche (Arabic: عبد الرؤوف ناطش; born 16 October 1982) is an Algerian professional footballer who plays as a goalkeeper for Olympique de Médéa.

== Club career ==
On 11 June 2014 Natèche signed a contract with MC Oran, joining them on a transfer from CS Constantine.
