= Abdelmalek Ziaya =

Algerian footballer (born 1984)

Personal information
- Full name: Abdelmalek Ziaya
- Date of birth: 23 January 1984 (age 42)
- Place of birth: Guelma, Algeria
- Height: 1.86 m (6 ft 1 in)
- Position: Striker

Senior career*
Years	Team	Apps	(Gls)
2002–2005	ES Guelma	62	(77)
2005–2010	ES Sétif	94	(27)
2010–2012	Ittihad	29	(12)
2012–2013	CA Bizertin	11	(4)
2013–2014	USM Alger	25	(6)
2014–2016	ES Sétif	11	(6)
2016	JS Kabylie	12	(0)
2017	ASM Oran	10	(4)
2018	MC El Eulma	11	(4)
2018–2019	USM Annaba	?	(?)

International career^{‡}
2010–2014	Algeria	6	(0)
- * Club domestic league appearances and goals as of 00:00, 25 July 2014 (EST) ‡ National team caps and goals as of 00:00, 25 July 2014 (EST)

Abdelmalek Ziaya (born 23 January 1984) is an Algerian former footballer.

== Career ==
=== ES Sétif ===
Ziaya was born in Guelma. He played regularly in ES Sétif's first team, and was a fixture in the club's 2006–07 Arab Champions League triumph, scoring a goal against Al-Ittihad in the second round and against Al-Nasr in the group stage. Ziaya scored again in the 2007–08 Arab Champions League versus Al-Wehda in the round of 16.

On 26 December 2009, it was announced that the 25-year-old Algerian striker was going to move on loan from ES Sétif to FC Sochaux with an option to buy. However, four days later, it was reported that ES Sétif president refused to loan the player to Sochaux and was negotiating with Saudi Arabian club Ittihad Jeddah.

=== Ittihad Jeddah ===
On 6 January 2010, Ziaya signed a two-year contract with Saudi Arabian Ittihad Jeddah, with the club paying €2 million for the transfer. He scored two goals in his first game for the club, a 4–1 win in a friendly against Al-Ettifaq. On 23 February 2010, Ziaya made his official debut for Al-Ittihad in an AFC Champions League match against FC Bunyodkor in Uzbekistan, with the score ending 3–0 in favour of the home side. He scored his first official goal for the club on 8 March 2010 in an AFC Champions League match Zob Ahan. Ziaya scored the goal in the 16th minute of the game, with the game ending 2–2. In his first league game for Ittihad, on 14 March against Al-Ahli, he delivered an assist to Manaf Abushgeer for the only goal of the game. Despite achieving only one championship with the team in two years, he is considered to be one of Ittihad's greatest strikers recently and has expressed his urge to rejoin Saudi Arabia.

=== Club Athlétique Bizertin ===
On 29 July 2012, Ziaya signed a two-year contract with Tunisian club CA Bizertin. On 1 August 2012, he made his official debut for the club in a league game against ES Zarzis, scoring a goal on the occasion.

== International career ==
After showing excellent form for ES Setif in 2009, scoring 15 goals in 13 games in the 2009 CAF Confederation Cup and a further 8 goals in first half of the domestic league, Ziaya was called up by Rabah Saadane for the 2010 African Cup of Nations in Angola.

On 12 January 2010, Ziaya made his debut for the Algerian National Team coming on as a substitute in the 63rd minute in a group game against Malawi at the 2010 African Cup of Nations.

== Career statistics ==
As of 10 January 2012

Club performance			League		Cup		League Cup		Continental		Total	
Season	Club	League	Apps	Goals	Apps	Goals	Apps	Goals	Apps	Goals	Apps	Goals
Saudi Arabia			League		Crown Prince Cup		League Cup		Asia		Total	
2009–10	Ittihad Jeddah	Saudi Premier League	2	1	0	0	5	2	5	3	12	6
2010–11	Ittihad Jeddah	Saudi Premier League	23	9	2	0	4	2	7	4	36	15
2011–12	Ittihad Jeddah	Saudi Premier League	4	2	0	0	0	0	2	0	6	2
Total	Country		29	12	2	0	9	4	14	7	54	23

== Honours ==
=== Club ===
ES Sétif

- CAF Champions League: 2014
- CAF Super Cup: 2015
- Algerian Ligue 1: 2006–07, 2008–09, 2014–15
- Algerian Super Cup: 2015
- Arab Champions League: 2006–07, 2007–08
- North African Cup of Champions: 2009
- Finalist of the CAF Confederation Cup: 2009

Ittihad FC

- Saudi Champions Cup: 2010

USM Alger

- Algerian Ligue 1: 2013–14
- Algerian Cup: 2013–14
- Algerian Super Cup: 2013

=== Individual ===
- 2009 CAF Confederation Cup top scorer (15 goals in 13 games)
