= Farès Mecheri =

French-Algerian footballer (born 1983)

Personal information
- Date of birth: 6 December 1983 (age 42)
- Place of birth: Lyon, France
- Height: 1.83 m (6 ft 0 in)
- Position: Striker

Senior career*
Years	Team	Apps	(Gls)
2006–2007	AS Lyon-Duchère	?	(?)
2007–2008	ES Setif	?	(?)
2008–2009	USM Alger	9	(1)
2009–2009	Wydad Casablanca	3	(1)
- * Club domestic league appearances and goals as of 1 July 2009

Farès Mecheri (born 6 December 1983) is a French-Algerian football who played as a striker.

== Club career ==
Mecheri was born in Lyon, France.

On 14 January 2009, he joined Wydad Casablanca from USM Alger. after, he played just three matches and scored one goal against Kawkab Marrakech. On 30 June 2009, Wydad Casablanca announced that they had terminated amicably his contract.

== Honours ==
- Won the Arab Champions League once with ES Setif in 2008
