= 2009 CAF Confederation Cup =

International football competition in Africa

Confederation of African Football Confederation Cup

Tournament details
- Dates: 30 January – 22 November
- Teams: 53

Final positions
- Champions: (Mali) Stade Malien (1st title)
- Runners-up: (Algeria) ES Sétif

Tournament statistics
- Matches played: 104
- Goals scored: 316 (3.04 per match)
- Top scorer: (Algeria) Abdelmalek Ziaya (15 goals)

The 2009 CAF Confederation Cup was the 6th edition of the CAF Confederation Cup, Africa's secondary club football competition organized by the Confederation of African Football (CAF). The competition began with the preliminary round stage in the first week of March 2009 and concluded with the second leg of the final match on the first week of December 2009. The winners played in the 2010 CAF Super Cup.

== Qualifying rounds ==
The draw for the preliminary round and the second round were made on December 4, 2008.

=== Preliminary round ===
1st legs played 30 January-1 February 2009 and 2nd legs played 13–15 February 2009, except the ASFAN-USM game which was postponed to Feb. 25.

Team 1	Agg.	Team 2	1st leg	2nd leg
US Ouagadougou (Burkina Faso)	1–1 (a)	(Senegal) ASC Diaraf	0–0	1–1
OC Bukavu Dawa (Democratic Republic of the Congo)	4–4 (a)	(Republic of the Congo) Club 57 Tourbillon	3–3	1–1
Tourbillon FC (Chad)	4–1	(Burundi) Vital'O F.C.	4–0	0–1
USM Libreville (Gabon)	2–1	(Niger) ASFAN	2–1	0–0
Hay Al Arab (Sudan)	1–1 (2–3 p)	(Libya) Al-Ahly SCSC	0–1	1–0
Sport Bissau e Benfica (Guinea-Bissau)	1–3	(Senegal) ASC Yakaar	1–2	0–1
Prisons FC (Tanzania)	0–6	(Libya) Khaleej Sirte	0–2	0–4
Mighty Barolle (Liberia)	1–4	(Ivory Coast) SOA	0–2	1–2
AS de Vacoas-Phoenix (Mauritius)	2–1	(Madagascar) AS Adema	1–1	1–0
Atlético Muçulmano (Mozambique)	2–5	(Eswatini) Malanti Chiefs	1–0	1–5
Victors FC (Uganda)	0–3	(Zimbabwe) CAPS United F.C.	0–2	0–1
Red Arrows F.C. (Zambia)	7–0	(Zanzibar) Mundu SC	6–0	1–0
Gor Mahia (Kenya)	0–6	(Rwanda) APR FC	0–5	0–1

==== Dispensation round ====
Team 1	Agg.	Team 2	1st leg	2nd leg
Deportivo Mongomo (Equatorial Guinea)	3–1	(Central African Republic) Anges de Fatima	2–0	1–1

Notes

1. Although both federations had inscribed their clubs after the deadline, the two were admitted for an intermediate round but can only gain access to the 1/16 finals in case a club already qualified forfeits; as this did not happen, also winners Deportivo Mongomo are eliminated.

=== First round ===
First Legs were played 13–15 March 2009 and second Legs played 3–5 April 2009

Team 1	Agg.	Team 2	1st leg	2nd leg
US Ouagadougou (Burkina Faso)	2–3	(Cameroon) Aigle Royal de la Menoua	2–1	0–2
Club 57 Tourbillon (Republic of the Congo)	0–1	(Nigeria) Bayelsa United FC	0–0	0–1
Tourbillon FC (Chad)	3–5	(Cameroon) US Douala	1–2	2–3
USM Libreville (Gabon)	2–5	(Angola) Santos FC	0–1	2–4
CS Sfaxien (Tunisia)	5–3	(Libya) Al-Ahly SCSC	4–1	1–2
Satellite FC (Guinea)	2–5	(Ivory Coast) JC Abidjan	1–2	1–3
ASC Yakaar (Senegal)	2–5	(Algeria) JSM Béjaïa	1–1	1–4
Stade Tunisien (Tunisia)	0–2	(Mali) Stade Malien	0–0	0–2
Khaleej Sirte (Libya)	0–6	(Algeria) ES Sétif	0–1	0–5
SOA (Ivory Coast)	3–6	(Angola) CRD Libolo	0–1	3–5
AS de Vacoas-Phoenix (Mauritius)	1–9	(South Africa) Mamelodi Sundowns	0–3	1–6
Malanti Chiefs (Eswatini)	1–6	(Democratic Republic of the Congo) AS Vita Club	1–3	0–3
CAPS United F.C. (Zimbabwe)	1–2	(Egypt) ENPPI	0–0	1–2
Red Arrows F.C. (Zambia)	2–2 (3–2 p)	(Nigeria) Ocean Boys FC	2–0	0–2
APR FC (Rwanda)	0–2	(Egypt) Haras El Hodood	0–0	0–2
MAS Fès (Morocco)	1–2	(Tunisia) EGS Gafsa	1–1	0–1

=== Second round ===
1st Legs to be played 17–19 April 2009 and 2nd Legs to be played 1–3 May 2009

Team 1	Agg.	Team 2	1st leg	2nd leg
Aigle Royal de la Menoua (Cameroon)	1–5	(Nigeria) Bayelsa United FC	1–0	0–5
US Douala (Cameroon)	1–5	(Angola) Santos FC	1–1	0–4
CS Sfaxien (Tunisia)	3–0	(Ivory Coast) JC Abidjan	2–0	1–0
JSM Béjaïa (Algeria)	1–1 (12–13 p)	(Mali) Stade Malien	1–0	0–1
ES Sétif (Algeria)	5–5 (a)	(Angola) CRD Libolo	4–0	1–5
Mamelodi Sundowns (South Africa)	2–3	(Democratic Republic of the Congo) AS Vita Club	2–2	0–1
ENPPI (Egypt)	4–3	(Zambia) Red Arrows F.C.	4–0	0–3
Haras El Hodood (Egypt)	6–1	(Tunisia) EGS Gafsa	3–0	3–1

=== Play-off round ===
Joined by round of 16 losers of the 2009 CAF Champions League. Winners to Group Stage.
1st Legs were played 17–19 May and 2nd Legs were played 29–31 May 2009.

Team 1	Agg.	Team 2	1st leg	2nd leg
Al Ahly (Egypt)	3–3 (5–6 p)	(Angola) Santos	3–0	0–3
ASEC Mimosas (Ivory Coast)	2–2 (a)	(Egypt) ENPPI	2–2	0–0
ES Sétif (Algeria)	4–4 (4–3 p)	(Mali) Djoliba	3–1	1–3
Coton Sport FC (Cameroon)	3–3 (a)	(Democratic Republic of the Congo) AS Vita Club	3–1	0–2
Al Ahly (Tripoli) (Libya)	1–2	(Egypt) Haras El Hodood	0–0	1–2
Kampala City Council (Uganda)	3–5	(Nigeria) Bayelsa United	3–1	0–4
Ittihad Khemisset (Morocco)	2–4	(Mali) Stade Malien	1–1	1–3
Primeiro de Agosto (Angola)	2–2 (5–4 p)	(Tunisia) CS Sfaxien	2–0	0–2

== Group stage ==
The group stage draw was held before the second round of 16 phase - with teams allocated to groups before the winners of ties were known. Matches were played from 17 July to 20 September 2009.

Teams qualified for next phase

=== Group A ===
Team	Pld	W	D	L	GF	GA	GD	Pts	ESS	ENP	VIT	SAN
(Algeria) ES Sétif	6	3	0	3	14	9	+5	9	—	1–3	2–0	6–0
(Egypt) ENPPI	6	3	0	3	13	10	+3	9	3–4	—	3–1	4–0
(Democratic Republic of the Congo) AS Vita Club	6	3	0	3	7	7	0	9	2–1	3–0	—	1–0
(Angola) Santos	6	3	0	3	3	11	−8	9	1–0	1–0	1–0	—

Legend: Blue = home team win; Yellow = draw; Red = away team win.

=== Group B ===
Team	Pld	W	D	L	GF	GA	GD	Pts	STA	BAY	PRI	HAR
(Mali) Stade Malien	6	2	3	1	5	3	+2	9 (Note: Stade Malien win the group over Bayelsa United on the basis of head-to-head away goals.)	—	0–1	0–0	2–0
(Nigeria) Bayelsa United	6	3	0	3	9	6	+3	9	1–2	—	4–0	2–0
(Angola) Primeiro de Agosto	6	2	2	2	5	10	−5	8	0–0	3–1	—	1–0
(Egypt) Haras El Hodood	6	2	1	3	7	7	0	7	1–1	1–0	5–1	—

Legend: Blue = home team win; Yellow = draw; Red = away team win.

== Knock-out stage ==
=== Bracket ===
Semi-Finals
1	(Nigeria) Bayelsa United	1	0	1
4	(Algeria) ES Sétif	1	1	2
3	(Egypt) ENPPI	2	2	4
2	(Mali) Stade Malien	2	4	6

Final
(Algeria) ES Sétif	2	0	2 (2)
(Mali) Stade Malien (p)	0	2	2 (3)

=== Semi-finals ===
The first legs are scheduled on 2–4 October and the second legs on 16–18 October.

Team 1	Agg.	Team 2	1st leg	2nd leg
Bayelsa United (Nigeria)	1–2	(Algeria) ES Sétif	1–1	0–1
ENPPI (Egypt)	4–6	(Mali) Stade Malien	2–2	2–4

=== Final ===
The first leg is scheduled on 29 November and the second leg on 5 December. Stade Malien won 3–2 on penalties to win the CAF Confederation Cup.

29 November 2009
18:00 UTC+1

ES Sétif (Algeria)	2 – 0	(Mali) Stade Malien
Ziaya 15', 80'	Report

Stade 8 Mai 1945, Sétif
Attendance: 25,000
Referee: Daniel Bennett (South Africa)
5 December 2009
17:00 UTC+1

Stade Malien (Mali)	2 – 0	(Algeria) ES Sétif
B. Coulibaly 53'; Bagayoko 55' (pen.)	Report
Penalties
Issiaka (penalty scored); M. Coulibaly (penalty scored); Koné (penalty missed); B. Coulibaly (penalty scored)	3 – 2	(penalty missed) Belkaïd; (penalty scored) Yekhlef; (penalty scored) Diss; (penalty missed) Seguer; (penalty missed) Djediat

Stade Modibo Kéïta, Bamako
Attendance: 35,000
Referee: Eddy Maillet (Seychelles)

== Top goalscorers ==
The top scorers from the 2009 CAF Confederation Cup are as follows:

Rank	Name	Team	Goals
1	(Algeria) Abdelmalek Ziaya	(Algeria) ES Sétif	15
2	(Egypt) Ahmed Raouf	(Egypt) ENPPI	8
3	(Mali) Bakary Coulibaly	(Mali) Stade Malien	7
4	(Democratic Republic of the Congo) Serge Lofo Bongeli	(Democratic Republic of the Congo) AS Vita Club	5
4	(Egypt) Ahmed Eid	(Egypt) Haras El Hodood	5
4	(Mali) Ousmane Bagayoko	(Mali) Stade Malien	5
4	(Zambia) Timothy Mbewe	(Zambia) Red Arrows	5
