= Rémi Adiko =

Ivorian footballer

Personal information
- Full name: Rémi Marcel Adiko
- Date of birth: 15 January 1984 (age 42)
- Place of birth: Abidjan, Ivory Coast
- Height: 5 ft 10 in (1.78 m)
- Position: Midfielder

Team information
- Current team: Al-Muharraq

Senior career*
Years	Team	Apps	(Gls)
2001	Africa Sports		
2002–2004	JC Abidjan		
2004–2005	Moghreb Tétouan		
2005–2006	Diables Noirs		
2006–2009	ES Sétif	58	(8)
2009–2010	Zamalek		
2010–2011	Alakhdhar		
2011–2013	Al-Merreikh		
2013–	Al-Muharraq		
- * Club domestic league appearances and goals as of February 1, 2014

Rémi Marcel Adiko (born 15 January 1982) is an Ivorian footballer who plays for Al-Muharraq in the Bahraini Premier League.

== Career ==
Adiko played for Egyptian Premier League side Zamalek, but struggled to make regular appearances with the first team. The club canceled his contract in the summer of 2010, and following his release, Adiko signed for Libyan Premier League club Alakhdhar.

Adiko helped Sudan Premier League side Al-Merreikh reach the semi-finals of the 2012 CAF Confederation Cup. . He started his training at 2007 to Grand Bassam.
