= Lamouri Djediat =

Algerian footballer (born 1982)

Personal information
- Full name: Lamouri Ben Kadda Djediat
- Date of birth: 20 December 1982 (age 43)
- Place of birth: Sour El-Ghozlane, Algeria
- Height: 1.86 m (6 ft 1 in)
- Position: Midfielder

Team information
- Current team: CR Belouizdad

Youth career
- E Sour El Ghozlane

Senior career*
Years	Team	Apps	(Gls)
2000–2003	E Sour El Ghozlane	–	(–)
2003–2007	Paradou AC	57	(15)
2007–2010	ES Sétif	52	(17)
2010–2011	ASO Chlef	24	(5)
2011–2014	USM Alger	64	(14)
2014–2015	CR Belouizdad	21	(3)
2015–	USM Bel-Abbès	23	(2)

International career^{‡}
2006	Algeria	10	(0)
- * Club domestic league appearances and goals as of 00:00, 1 December 2017 (EST) ‡ National team caps and goals as of 00:00, 1 August 2014 (EST)

Lamouri Ben Kadda Djediat (born 20 December 1982) is an Algerian footballer who plays for USM Bel-Abbès in the Algerian Ligue Professionnelle 1.

== Club career ==
Born in Sour El-Ghozlane, Djediat began his career in the junior ranks of his hometown club of Entente Sour El Ghozlane. In 2003, he joined newly promoted Algerian Championnat National 2 side Paradou AC.

=== ES Sétif ===
In June 2007, after four seasons with Paradou, Djediat joined defending Algerian Championnat National champions ES Sétif. ES Sétif paid a transfer fee of 22,000,000 Algerian dinars, the highest transfer fee in Algeria at the time.

In his first season with the club, he helped the club retain its Arab Champions League title, beating Wydad Casablanca 2-0 o aggregate in the final. Djediat was chosen as the best player of the competition.

=== ASO Chlef ===
On 24 August 2010 Djediat signed a one-year contract with ASO Chlef. In his first season with the club, Djediat made 24 league appearances, scoring 5 goals, to lead ASO Chlef to its first league title.

=== USM Alger ===
On 27 July 2011 Djediat signed a one-year contract with USM Alger. On 10 September 2011 he made his official debut for the club as a starter in a league match against CA Batna, scoring a goal in the 42nd minute.

== Honours ==
=== Club ===
- Won the Arab Champions League twice
  - Once with ES Sétif in 2008
  - Once with USM Alger in 2013
- Won the Algerian Ligue Professionnelle 1 twice:
  - Once with ES Sétif in 2009
  - Once with ASO Chlef in 2011
- Won the Algerian Cup twice
  - Cnce with ES Sétif in 2010
  - Once with USM Alger in 2013
- Won the North African Cup of Champions once with ES Sétif in 2009

=== Individual ===
- Chosen as the Best Player of the 2007–08 Arab Champions League
- Top scorer of the 2012–13 UAFA Club Cup
