= 2006–07 Arab Champions League =

دوري أبطال العرب 2006–07

Tournament details
- Dates: 9 Sep 2006 – 17 May 2007
- Teams: 32 (from 1 association)

Final positions
- Champions: (Algeria) ES Sétif (1st title)
- Runners-up: (Jordan) Al-Faisaly SC

Tournament statistics
- Best player: (Algeria) Lazhar Hadj Aissa

The 2006–07 Arab Champions League saw the 4th edition of Arab Champions League. 32 teams represented Arab nations from Africa and Asia. ES Sétif of Algeria won the final against Al-Faisaly SC of Jordan.

== The System ==
- Round 32: Knock out stage
- Round 16: Knock out stage
- Round 8: Two groups of four
- Semifinals and final: Knock out stage

== Round of 32 ==
32 teams play home and away matches as Knock out stage.

Team 1	Agg.	Team 2	1st leg	2nd leg
Zamalek SC (Egypt)	3–2	(Morocco) CODM Meknès	1–0	2–2
Al-Nassr (Saudi Arabia)	21–1	(Djibouti) SID Kartileh	12–1	9–0
Al Ittihad (Saudi Arabia)	4–4 (3–0)	(Morocco) Olympique Khouribga	3–1	1–3
Raja Casablanca (Morocco)	14–0	(Palestine) Markaz Tulkarem	8–0	6–0
Ismaily (Egypt)	6–2	(Iraq) Arbil	2–0	4–2
Al Ahli (United Arab Emirates)	3–3 (3–4)	Al Kuwait Kaifan	1–2	2–1
ENPPI (Egypt)	4–1	(Syria) Al-Jaish	3–1	1–0
MC Alger (Algeria)	2–1	(Yemen) Al-Tilal Aden	2–1	0–0
Al-Merreikh (Sudan)	2–3	(Algeria) ES Sétif	2–0	0–3
Al Ahli (Saudi Arabia)	0–0 (9–8)	(Tunisia) Union Sportive Monastir	0–0	0–0
Al Qadsia Kuwait	5–2	(Lebanon) Al Ansar	2–1	3–1
Alittihad Tripoli S.C. (Libya)	8–2	(Oman) Al Nahda	4–0	4–2
Al Ahli (Bahrain)	1–2	(Algeria) CA Bordj Bou Arreridj	1–0	0–2
Al Ahli (Qatar)	2–3	(Jordan) Shabab Al-Ordon	0–2	2–1
Al-Faisaly (Jordan)	2–1	(Mauritania) ASC Nasr de Sebkha	2–1	0–0
Club Africain (Tunisia)	6–1	(Syria) Al-Wahda Damascus	3–0	3–1

== Round of 16 ==
16 teams play home and away matches as Knock out stage

Team 1	Agg.	Team 2	1st leg	2nd leg
ENPPI (Egypt)	2–2(a)	(Jordan) Al-Faisaly	2–1	0–1
CA Bordj Bou Arreridj (Algeria)	0–0 (5–3)	(Egypt) Ismaily	0–0	0–0
Al Ahli (Saudi Arabia)	(a)4–4	(Morocco) Raja Casablanca	1–1	3–3
ES Sétif (Algeria)	5–4	(Saudi Arabia) Al Ittihad	4–1	1–3
Zamalek SC (Egypt)	1–1 (4–1)	(Libya) Alittihad Tripoli S.C.	1–0	0–1
Al-Nassr (Saudi Arabia)	4–3	(Algeria) MC Alger	2–1	2–2
Shabab Al-Ordon (Jordan)	3–4	Al Kuwait Kaifan	2–2	1–2
Al Qadsia Kuwait	2–1	(Tunisia) Club Africain	1–0	1–1

== Group stage ==
=== Group A ===
Team	Pld	W	D	L	GF	GA	GD	Pts
(Egypt) Zamalek SC	6	3	2	1	10	7	+3	11
(Saudi Arabia) Al Ahli	6	3	1	2	12	5	+7	10
(Algeria) CA Bordj Bou Arreridj	6	2	2	2	7	7	0	8
Al Qadsia Kuwait	6	1	1	4	7	17	−10	4

==== Results ====
11 Dec

Zamalek	2–2	CA Bordj Bou Arréridj

11 Dec

Al-Ahli	6–0	Al-Qadissiyah

19 Dec

CA Bordj Bou Arréridj	1–0	Al-Ahli

20 Dec

Al-Qadissiyah	2–1	Zamalek

7 Jan

Zamalek	1–0	Al-Ahli

8 Jan

Al-Qadissiyah	1–1	CA Bordj Bou Arréridj

13 Feb

Al-Ahli	2–1	CA Bordj Bou Arréridj

15 Feb

Zamalek	4–2	Al-Qadissiyah

26 Feb

CA Bordj Bou Arréridj	0–1	Zamalek

26 Feb

Al-Qadissiyah	1–3	Al-Ahli

11 Mar

CA Bordj Bou Arréridj	2–1	Al-Qadissiyah

13 Mar

Al-Ahli	1–1	Zamalek

=== Group B ===
Team	Pld	W	D	L	GF	GA	GD	Pts
(Algeria) ES Sétif	6	3	2	1	10	4	+6	11
(Jordan) Al-Faisaly	6	2	3	1	9	7	+2	9
(Saudi Arabia) Al-Nassr	6	1	4	1	3	4	−1	7
Al Kuwait Kaifan	6	0	3	3	5	12	−7	3

==== Results ====
11 Dec

Al-Kuwait SC	0–1	Al-Faysali

12 Dec

Al-Nasr	1–2	ES Sétif

21 Dec

Al-Faysali	1–0	Al-Nasr

25 Dec

ES Sétif	0–0	Al-Kuwait SC

3 Jan

Al-Nasr	3–0	Al-Kuwait SC

8 Jan

Al-Faysali	1–0	ES Sétif

13 Feb

Al-Kuwait SC	0–1	ES Sétif

13 Feb

Al-Nasr	3–1	Al-Faysali

23 Feb

Al-Faysali	0–1	Al-Kuwait SC

27 Feb

ES Sétif	1–0	Al-Nasr

13 Mar

Al-Kuwait SC	0–2	Al-Nasr

15 Mar

ES Sétif	0–0	Al-Faysali

== Semi-finals ==
Team 1	Agg.	Team 2	1st leg	2nd leg
Al-Faisaly (Jordan)	2–1	(Egypt) Zamalek	0–0	2–1
Al-Ahli (Saudi Arabia)	1–2	(Algeria) ES Sétif	1–0	0–2

=== Matches ===
3 April 2007

Al-Faisaly (Jordan)	0–0	(Egypt) Zamalek SC

Amman International Stadium, Amman

17 April 2007

Zamalek SC (Egypt)	1–2	(Jordan) Al-Faisaly
Zaki 80' (pen.)	Report	Saad; Abdul-Amir

Cairo

2 April 2007

Al Ahli (Saudi Arabia)	1–0	(Algeria) ES Sétif
Badra 50' (pen.)	Report

Jeddah
Referee: Muhsen Basma (Syria

18 April 2007

ES Sétif (Algeria)	2–0	(Saudi Arabia) Al Ahli
Derradj 50'; Adiko 90'	Report

Stade 8 Mai 1945, Sétif
Referee: Abderrahim El Arjoun (Morocco)

== Final ==
Team 1	Agg.	Team 2	1st leg	2nd leg
ES Sétif (Algeria)	2–1	(Jordan) Al-Faisaly	1–1	1–0

=== Matches ===
3 May 2007

ES Sétif (Algeria)	1–1	(Jordan) Al-Faisaly
Adiko 32'	Report	Aqel 88'

Stade 8 Mai 1945, Sétif
Attendance: 30,000
Referee: Ali Hamad (United Arab Emirates)

17 May 2007

Al-Faisaly (Jordan)	0–1	(Algeria) ES Sétif
	Report	Touil 45'

Amman International Stadium, Amman
Attendance: 25,000
Referee: Essam Abd El Fatah (Egypt)

== Champions ==
2006–07 Arab Champions League
Winners

ES Sétif
First Title
