= 2010 Algerian Cup final =

Association football match

- Stade du 5 Juillet hosted the match
- Event: 2009–10 Algerian Cup
ES Sétif	CA Batna
3	0
- Date: 21 April 2010
- Venue: Stade 5 Juillet 1962, Algiers
- Man of the Match: Hocine Metref
- Referee: Djamel Haimoudi
- Attendance: 50,000

The 2010 FA Cup final saw ES Sétif beat CA Batna to win their seventh Algerian Cup. The match took place on Wednesday, 21 April 2010 at the Stade 5 Juillet 1962 in Algiers and ended 3–0 with a brace by Hocine Metref and an own goal from Saber Chebana. With his two goals, Metref was chosen as the Man of the Match.

== Background ==
Prior to the 2010 final, ES Sétif had reached the final of the Algerian Cup six times, winning all six of them, while CA Batna had reached the final just once in 1997, losing to USM Alger in the final.

ES Sétif won both of the games between the two sides in the 2009–10 Algerian Championnat National, winning 2–1 at home and 3–0 in Batna.

== Route to the final ==
ES Sétif		Round	CA Batna	
US Doucen; H 8–1	Ambané 1', 36', Kadri 4', 34', 48', 69'; Bouderbal 62', Kaddour 68'	Round of 64	USB Hassi R’Mel; H 2–0	Kebia 21', 56'
MC Saïda; H 1–0	Delhoum 27'	Round of 32	CS Hamma Loulou; A 2–1	Messaâdia 47', Bensaci 82'
WA Tlemcen; A 1–1; Penalties: 4-2	Djediat 87'	Round of 16	USM Blida; H 0–0; Penalties: 4-3	
USM Bel-Abbès; H 1–0	Bencharif 11'	Quarter-finals	MC Alger; H 1–0 (aet)	Boukhlouf 90+3'
ASO Chlef; H 3–1	Feham 18', Hemani 67', Djediat 84'	Semi-Finals	JS Kabylie; H 0–0; Penalties: 7-6	

== Match details ==
21 April 2010
16:00

ES Sétif	3–0	CA Batna
Hocine Metref 36', 72'; Saber Chebana 68' (o.g.)	Report (in French)

Stade 5 Juillet 1962, Algiers
Attendance: 50,000
Referee: Djamel Haimoudi

ES Sétif	CA Batna

GK	1	(Algeria) Fawzi Chaouchi
RB	17	(Algeria) Slimane Raho
CB	4	(Algeria) Abdelkader Laïfaoui
CB	6	(Algeria) Farouk Belkaïd
LB	22	(Algeria) Mohamed Yekhlef		(substituted off) 76'
RM	24	(Cameroon) Francis Ambané		(substituted off) 79'
CM	8	(Algeria) Khaled Lemmouchia
CM	13	(Algeria) Mourad Delhoum
LM	23	(Algeria) Hocine Metref	(yellow card) 37'
CF	19	(Algeria) Nabil Hemani	(yellow card) 44'	(substituted off) 81'
CF	10	(Algeria) Lazhar Hadj Aïssa (c)
Substitutes:
DF	5	(Algeria) Smaïl Diss		(substituted on) 76'
CM	14	(Algeria) Lamouri Djediat		(substituted on) 81'
CM	15	(Algeria) Bouazza Feham		(substituted on) 79'
GK		(Algeria) Mohamed Seghir Ferradji
DF		(Algeria) Riad Benchadi
CM		(Algeria) Mehdi Kacem
FW		(Algeria) Lyes Kouriba
Manager:
(Algeria) Noureddine Zekri

GK	16	(Algeria) Yacine Babouche
RB	15	(Algeria) Samir Saïd Soualah
CB	4	(Algeria) Saber Chebana
CB	5	(Algeria) Salim Aribi (c)
LB	7	(Algeria) Ali Daira
RM	27	(Algeria) Nacerdine Bensaci	(yellow card) 40'
CM	8	(Algeria) Lazhar Benhacene
CM	23	(Algeria) Abdellah Rasmal		(substituted off) 77'
LM	26	(Algeria) Amine Elaid Fezzani
CF	24	(Algeria) Amine Boukhlouf
CF	10	(Algeria) Mohamed Amir Bourahli		(substituted off) 57'
Substitutes:
DF	3	(Algeria) Toufik Bettoumi		(substituted on) 77'
DF	17	(Algeria) Ahmed Messaâdia		(substituted on) 57'
DF		(Algeria) Hamza Kerboua
DF		(Algeria) Fayçal Ziouar
MF		(Algeria) Ibrahim Kebia
FW		(Algeria) Mohamed Abdelaziz Tchikou
Manager:
(Algeria) Mustapha Biskri

MATCH OFFICIALS

- Assistant referees:
  - Meksous
  - Choukri Bechirène
- Fourth official: Mohamed Bichari

MAN OF THE MATCH

- (Algeria) Hocine Metref (ES Sétif)

MATCH RULES

- 90 minutes.
- 30 minutes of extra-time if necessary.
- Penalty shootout if scores still level.
- Seven named substitutes.
- Maximum of three substitutions.

== See also ==
- 2009–10 Algerian Cup
- Algerian Cup
