= Football records and statistics in Algeria =

This page details football records in Algeria.

== Most successful clubs overall ==
Below is a list of football clubs in Algeria. It contains all clubs that have played in different Algerian leagues divisions since 1962, the independence year of Algeria. However most of teams were founded before this year.

Club	Algeria				Maghreb		North Africa				Arab World			Africa					Inter.		Total
Club	L	C	SC	LC	CC	WC	NC	CC	WC	SC	CC	WC	SC	CL	CCC	SC	WC	CC	AAC	CWC	Total
JS Kabylie	14	5	1	1	-	-	-	-	-	-	-	-	-	2	-	-	1	3	-	-	27
MC Alger	10	8	5	1	-	2	-	-	-	-	-	-	-	1	-	-	-	-	-	-	27
ES Sétif	8	8	2	-	-	-	-	1	1	1	2	-	-	2	-	1	-	-	1	-	27
CR Belouizdad	10	9	2	1	3	-	-	-	-	-	-	-	-	-	-	-	-	-	-	-	25
USM Alger	8	10	2	-	-	-	-	-	-	-	1	-	-	-	2	1	-	-	-	-	24
MC Oran	4	4	-	1	-	-	-	-	-	-	-	2	1	-	-	-	-	-	-	-	12
USM El Harrach	1	2	-	-	-	-	-	-	-	-	-	-	-	-	-	-	-	-	-	-	3
WA Tlemcen	-	2	-	-	-	-	-	-	-	-	1	-	-	-	-	-	-	-	-	-	3
ASO Chlef	1	2	-	-	-	-	-	-	-	-	-	-	-	-	-	-	-	-	-	-	3
USM Bel Abbès	-	2	1	-	-	-	-	-	-	-	-	-	-	-	-	-	-	-	-	-	3
CS Constantine	2	-	-	-	-	-	-	-	-	-	-	-	-	-	-	-	-	-	-	-	2
NA Hussein Dey	1	1	-	-	-	-	-	-	-	-	-	-	-	-	-	-	-	-	-	-	2
Hamra Annaba	1	1	-	-	-	-	-	-	-	-	-	-	-	-	-	-	-	-	-	-	2
RC Kouba	1	-	1	-	-	-	-	-	-	-	-	-	-	-	-	-	-	-	-	-	2
US Chaouia	1	-	1	-	-	-	-	-	-	-	-	-	-	-	-	-	-	-	-	-	2
MO Constantine	1	-	-	-	-	-	-	-	-	-	-	-	-	-	-	-	-	-	-	-	1
GC Mascara	1	-	-	-	-	-	-	-	-	-	-	-	-	-	-	-	-	-	-	-	1
JSM Béjaïa	-	1	-	-	-	-	-	-	-	-	-	-	-	-	-	-	-	-	-	-	1
MO Béjaïa	-	1	-	-	-	-	-	-	-	-	-	-	-	-	-	-	-	-	-	-	1
CR Béni Thour	-	1	-	-	-	-	-	-	-	-	-	-	-	-	-	-	-	-	-	-	1
JH Djazaïr	-	1	-	-	-	-	-	-	-	-	-	-	-	-	-	-	-	-	-	-	1
MC Saïda	-	1	-	-	-	-	-	-	-	-	-	-	-	-	-	-	-	-	-	-	1

=== Non-CAF competition ===
The 1982 African Super Cup is a match which took place on January 25, 1982 during the Tournament of Fraternity in Abidjan, Ivory Coast. JS Kabylie won this trophy against the Cameroonians of Union Douala. The newspaper France Football commented on this event of the birth of the brand new African Super Cup. This African trophy won by the JSK is one of the 7 African titles won in its history and one of the 28 major trophies won by the Kabyle club.

Legends

Algeria	L	Algerian Ligue 1
Algeria	C	Algerian Cup
Algeria	SC	Algerian Super Cup
Algeria	LC	Algerian League Cup
Maghreb	CC	Maghreb Champions Cup
Maghreb	WC	Maghreb Cup Winners Cup
North Africa	NC	UNAF Club Cup
North Africa	CC	North African Cup of Champions
North Africa	WC	North African Cup Winners Cup
North Africa	SC	North African Super Cup

Arab World	CC	Arab Club Championship
Arab World	WC	Arab Cup Winners' Cup
Arab World	SC	Arab Super Cup
Africa	CL	CAF Champions League
Africa	CCC	CAF Confederation Cup
Africa	SC	CAF Super Cup
Africa	WC	African Cup Winners' Cup
Africa	CC	CAF Cup
Inter-continental	AAC	Afro-Asian Club Championship
Inter-continental	CWC	FIFA Club World Cup
