= Slimane Raho =

Algerian footballer (born 1975)

Personal information
- Full name: Slimane Raho
- Date of birth: 20 October 1975 (age 51)
- Place of birth: Oran, Algeria
- Height: 1.78 m (5 ft 10 in)
- Position: Right-back

Youth career
- 1986–1988: ASPTT Oran
- 1988–1990: USM Oran
- 1990–1992: AST Oran

Senior career*
Years	Team	Apps	(Gls)
1992–1996	ASM Oran		
1996–1999	MC Oran		
1999–2006	JS Kabylie	148	(8)
2006–2011	ES Sétif	108	(1)
2012–2016	Noisy-le-Sec	94	(5)

International career
1997	Algeria U23	1	(0)
1998–2010	Algeria	48	(0)
- * Club domestic league appearances and goals

Slimane Raho (born 20 October 1975) is an Algerian former professional football who played as a right-back. An international from 1998 to 2010, Raho represented the Algeria national team from 1998 to 2010, participating in the 2002, 2004 and 2010 Africa Cup of Nations. In total, he had 48 caps for the team, including 18 FIFA World Cup qualifying matches. He made his debut for the national team against Libya on 14 August 1998.

== International statistics ==
Algeria national team
Year	Apps	Goals
1998	3	0
1999	0	0
2000	1	0
2001	11	0
2002	7	0
2003	3	0
2004	6	0
2005	3	0
2006	0	0
2007	0	0
2008	8	0
2009	3	0
2010	3	0
Total	48	0

== Honours ==
MC Oran

- Ligue 1: Runner-up 1995–96, 1996–97
- Algerian Cup: 1995–96; Runners-up 1997–98
- Algerian League Cup: 1995–96
- Arab Cup Winners' Cup: 1997, 1998
- Arab Super Cup: 1999

JS Kabylie

- Ligue 1: 2003–04, 2005–06; Runner-up 2001–02, 2004–05
- Algerian Cup: Runners-up 2003–04
- CAF Cup: 2000, 2001, 2002

ES Setif

- Ligue 1: 2003–04, 2006–07; Runner-up 2008–09
- Algerian Cup: Runners-up 2009–10
- Arab Club Champions Cup: 2006–07, 2007–08
- North African Cup of Champions: 2009
- North African Cup Winners Cup: 2010
- North African Super Cup: 2010

International

- African Cup of Nations: Fourth place 2010
