= Abdelkader Laïfaoui =

Algerian footballer (born 1981)

Personal information
- Full name: Abdelkader Laïfaoui
- Date of birth: 29 July 1981 (age 45)
- Place of birth: Hussein Dey, Algeria
- Height: 1.78 m (5 ft 10 in)
- Position: Defender

Senior career*
| Years | Team | Apps | (Gls) |
| 1999–2003 | OMR El Annasser | - | (-) |
| 2003–2005 | NA Hussein Dey | 52 | (2) |
| 2005–2007 | CR Belouizdad | 53 | (4) |
| 2007–2011 | ES Sétif | 87 | (4) |
| 2011–2015 | USM Alger | 57 | (2) |
| 2015–2018 | USM Blida | 66 | (1) |

International career
| 2004–2011 | Algeria | 8 | (0) |
| 2010–2011 | Algeria A' | 9 | (0) |
- * Club domestic league appearances and goals

Abdelkader Laïfaoui (born 29 July 1981) is an Algerian international retired footballer. Mainly a central defender, he could also play as a right back.

An Algerian international since 2004, Laïfaoui was a member of the Algeria national team at the 2010 Africa Cup of Nations and the 2010 FIFA World Cup. He was also a member of the Algeria A' national team that finished fourth at the 2011 African Nations Championship in Sudan.

== Club career ==
In December 2005, Laïfaoui was linked with a move to Tunisian side Club Africain. Despite traveling to Tunis and agreeing to personal terms with the club, CR Belouizdad refused to release the player and an agreement on a transfer fee could not be reached.

On 25 July 2011 Laïfaoui signed a two-year contract with USM Alger, joining them on a free transfer from ES Sétif. On 14 April 2012, in a league game against MC Saïda at Saïda's Stade 13 Avril 1958, Laïfaoui was stabbed by opposing fans who stormed the pitch at the end of the game. As a result of his injuries he had to receive stitches and spend the night in hospital.

== Honours ==
=== Club ===
- Won the Algerian League once with ES Sétif in 2009
- Won the Arab Champions League twice with ES Sétif in 2007 and 2008
- Won the North African Cup of Champions once with ES Sétif in 2009
- Won the North African Super Cup once with ES Sétif in 2010
- Won the Algerian Cup twice
  - Once with ES Sétif in 2010
  - Once with USM Alger in 2013
- Won the North African Cup Winners Cup once with ES Sétif in 2010
- Finalist of the CAF Confederation Cup once with ES Sétif in 2009
- Won the UAFA Club Cup once with USM Alger in 2012–13
- Won the Algerian Super Cup once with USM Alger in 2013
- Won the Ligue 1 once with USM Alger in 2013–14

=== Country ===
- Has 7 caps for the Algerian National Team
- Semi-finalist of the 2010 African Cup of Nations
- Played at the 2010 FIFA World Cup
