= Football in Algeria =

- Country: Algeria
- Governing body: FAF
- National team: Algeria
- First played: 1894
- Clubs: +1000

National competitions
- FIFA World Cup; Africa Cup of Nations; FIFA Arab Cup

Club competitions
- List: League: Ligue Pro. 1 Ligue 2 Inter-Régions Régional I Régional II DH DPH; Cups: Cup League Cup Super Cup

International competitions
- FIFA Club World Cup; CAF Champions League; UNAF Club Cup; Arab Club Champions Cup

Football in Algeria (soccer) is the country's most popular sport. Approximately half of the people in Algeria are interested in football.

The country's top domestic league is organised into two national divisions, the Algerian Ligue Professionnelle 1 and the Algerian Ligue Professionnelle 2, overseen by the Algerian Football Federation.

== History ==
=== Beginning ===
On 11 April 1882, during the French occupation of Algeria era, the first Algerian club was formed in Oran. L'Oranaise Club was founded by European settlers, it's one of the first clubs on the entire African continent. On 5 February 1894, Club des Joyeusetés d'Oran, was founded in the neighborhood El-Derb of Oran. It was followed by the Club Athlétique Liberté d'Oran (CAL Oran), formed in 1897 by European settlers too in the neighborhood Saint-Antoine of Oran under the name Club Athlétique d'Oran. These are the first clubs in the country and the Maghreb. Other clubs will follow later, and will be created in various cities including Oran.

In 1898 the first Muslim football club, CS Constantine, was created in Constantine under the name of IKBAL Emancipation.

In 1911 the French Football Federation created a North African Championship representing the third French division (honor league), which became an official competition in 1921 after creation in 1920 of the three regional leagues in Oran, Algiers and Constantine. The winner of each league qualified for the North African Championship.

=== After independence ===
The Algerian Football Federation was founded in 1963 in order to organise national competitions and international matches. The first national championship and the cup started immediately after independence in 1962.

== Club football ==
Level	League(s) / Division(s)			
1	Algerian Ligue Professionnelle 1; 16 clubs			
2	Algerian League 2; 16 clubs			
3	National – Group West; 16 clubs	National – Group Centre; 16 clubs		National – Group East; 16 clubs
4	Interregional – Group West; 16 clubs	Interregional – Group Centre West; 16 clubs	Interregional – Group Centre East; 16 clubs	Interregional – Group East; 16 clubs

=== List of football clubs in Algeria by major honours won ===
==== Before independence period (French Algeria) ====
Below is a list of football clubs in Algeria before independence. It contains all clubs that have played in different French Algerian leagues divisions before 1962, the independence year of Algeria. Most of the clubs that were founded by the European settlers were dissolved in 1962.

Club	Regional Leagues (Algiers, Oran, Constantine)		Algeria		North Africa		Total
Club	Champ. (LA / LO / LC)	Cup (FC / OC / CC)	CFA	AC	NACh	NAC	Total
SC Bel Abbès	15		1	3	7	2	28
GS Alger	9		2	-	4	-	15
CDJ Oran	7		-	-	1	4	12
FC Blida	6		-	-	2	1	9
AS Saint Eugène	6		1	-	1	1	9
RU Alger	4		-	-	2	2	8
USM Oran	7		-	-	-	-	7
JAC Bône	5		-	-	1	-	6
AS Marine d'Oran	3		-	1	1	-	5
O. Hussein Dey	4		1	-	-	-	5
AS Boufarik	5		-	-	-	-	5
ESM Guelma	3		-	-	1	-	4
AS Bône	4		-	-	-	-	4
US Constantine	4		-	-	-	-	4
GC Oran	2		-	-	1	-	3
GS Orléansville	3		-	-	-	-	3
JS Guelma	3		-	-	-	-	3
RC Philippeville	3		-	-	-	-	3
USSC Témouchent	1		-	-	-	1	2
FC Oran	2		-	-	-	-	2
JS Djidjelli	2		-	-	-	-	2
MC Alger	2		-	-	-	-	2
MO Constantine	2		-	-	-	-	2
SO Sétif	2		-	-	-	-	2
USM Sétif	2		-	-	-	-	2
GS Perrégauloise	-		-	1	-	-	1
AC Bône	1		-	-	-	-	1
AS Marsa	1		-	-	-	-	1
CAL Oran	1		-	-	-	-	1
GC Mascara	1		-	-	-	-	1
JSM Philippeville	1		-	-	-	-	1
JS Philippeville	1		-	-	-	-	1
MC Oran	1		-	-	-	-	1
US Blida	1		-	-	-	-	1
USM Bône	1		-	-	-	-	1

==== After independence period (Algeria) ====
Below is a list of football clubs in Algeria. It contains all clubs that have played in different Algerian leagues divisions since 1962, the independence year of Algeria. However most of teams were founded before this year.

Club	Algeria				Maghreb		North Africa				Arab World			Africa					Inter.		Total
Club	L	C	SC	LC	CC	WC	NC	CC	WC	SC	CC	WC	SC	CL	CCC	SC	WC	CC	AAC	CWC	Total
JS Kabylie	14	5	1	1	-	-	-	-	-	-	-	-	-	2	-	-	1	3	-	-	27
MC Alger	10	8	5	1	-	2	-	-	-	-	-	-	-	1	-	-	-	-	-	-	27
ES Sétif	8	8	2	-	-	-	-	1	1	1	2	-	-	2	-	1	-	-	1	-	27
CR Belouizdad	10	9	2	1	3	-	-	-	-	-	-	-	-	-	-	-	-	-	-	-	25
USM Alger	8	10	2	-	-	-	-	-	-	-	1	-	-	-	2	1	-	-	-	-	24
MC Oran	4	4	-	1	-	-	-	-	-	-	-	2	1	-	-	-	-	-	-	-	12
USM El Harrach	1	2	-	-	-	-	-	-	-	-	-	-	-	-	-	-	-	-	-	-	3
WA Tlemcen	-	2	-	-	-	-	-	-	-	-	1	-	-	-	-	-	-	-	-	-	3
ASO Chlef	1	2	-	-	-	-	-	-	-	-	-	-	-	-	-	-	-	-	-	-	3
USM Bel Abbès	-	2	1	-	-	-	-	-	-	-	-	-	-	-	-	-	-	-	-	-	3
CS Constantine	2	-	-	-	-	-	-	-	-	-	-	-	-	-	-	-	-	-	-	-	2
NA Hussein Dey	1	1	-	-	-	-	-	-	-	-	-	-	-	-	-	-	-	-	-	-	2
Hamra Annaba	1	1	-	-	-	-	-	-	-	-	-	-	-	-	-	-	-	-	-	-	2
RC Kouba	1	-	1	-	-	-	-	-	-	-	-	-	-	-	-	-	-	-	-	-	2
US Chaouia	1	-	1	-	-	-	-	-	-	-	-	-	-	-	-	-	-	-	-	-	2
MO Constantine	1	-	-	-	-	-	-	-	-	-	-	-	-	-	-	-	-	-	-	-	1
GC Mascara	1	-	-	-	-	-	-	-	-	-	-	-	-	-	-	-	-	-	-	-	1
JSM Béjaïa	-	1	-	-	-	-	-	-	-	-	-	-	-	-	-	-	-	-	-	-	1
MO Béjaïa	-	1	-	-	-	-	-	-	-	-	-	-	-	-	-	-	-	-	-	-	1
CR Béni Thour	-	1	-	-	-	-	-	-	-	-	-	-	-	-	-	-	-	-	-	-	1
JH Djazaïr	-	1	-	-	-	-	-	-	-	-	-	-	-	-	-	-	-	-	-	-	1
MC Saïda	-	1	-	-	-	-	-	-	-	-	-	-	-	-	-	-	-	-	-	-	1

=== Non-CAF competition ===
The 1982 African Super Cup is a match which took place on January 25, 1982 during the Tournament of Fraternity in Abidjan, Ivory Coast. JS Kabylie won this trophy against the Cameroonians of Union Douala. The newspaper France Football commented on this event of the birth of the brand new African Super Cup. This African trophy won by the JSK is one of the 7 African titles won in its history and one of the 28 major trophies won by the Kabyle club.

Legends

Algeria	L	Algerian Ligue 1
Algeria	C	Algerian Cup
Algeria	SC	Algerian Super Cup
Algeria	LC	Algerian League Cup
Maghreb	CC	Maghreb Champions Cup
Maghreb	WC	Maghreb Cup Winners Cup
North Africa	NC	UNAF Club Cup
North Africa	CC	North African Cup of Champions
North Africa	WC	North African Cup Winners Cup
North Africa	SC	North African Super Cup

Arab World	CC	Arab Club Championship
Arab World	WC	Arab Cup Winners' Cup
Arab World	SC	Arab Super Cup
Africa	CL	CAF Champions League
Africa	CCC	CAF Confederation Cup
Africa	SC	CAF Super Cup
Africa	WC	African Cup Winners' Cup
Africa	CC	CAF Cup
Inter-continental	AAC	Afro-Asian Club Championship
Inter-continental	CWC	FIFA Club World Cup

== National teams ==
=== FLN team ===
In 1958, a representative selection of Algeria's National Team (FLN football team) is secretly created by the National Liberation Front (FLN) to serve the cause of Algeria. it is composed essentially of professional players who play in the French league such Rachid Mekhloufi. The team played its first international game in a group test before its creation in 1957 in Tunis against Tunisia. Its played several friendly matches with high level national teams and clubs.

=== Algeria national team ===
After independence in 1962, Algeria's national team replace the FLN football team. This team saw its period of greatest success in the 1980s with great players such Lakhdar Belloumi, Rabah Madjer, Salah Assad. Algeria qualified for the FIFA World Cup in 1982 and 1986, 2010 and 2014 and qualified to second round in 2014 World Cup after defeating 4-2 South Korea and 1-1 drawing with Russia. The team was eliminated by Germany, crowned as champions by a 2–1 score at extra time.

During the 1982 tournament, Algeria managed a surprise defeat of West Germany in their first ever World Cup game and thus became the first African team to defeat European opposition at the World Cup, but were eliminated after the so-called "Shame of Gijón".

Due to Algeria's historic ties with France, there have been a number of Algerian players playing professionally in the French leagues, while the France national team has included players of Algerian heritage, most notably Zinedine Zidane, Karim Benzema and Samir Nasri.

=== Future for the Algerians Program ===
Stadiums in Algeria
Stade du 5 Juillet
Capacity: 64,000

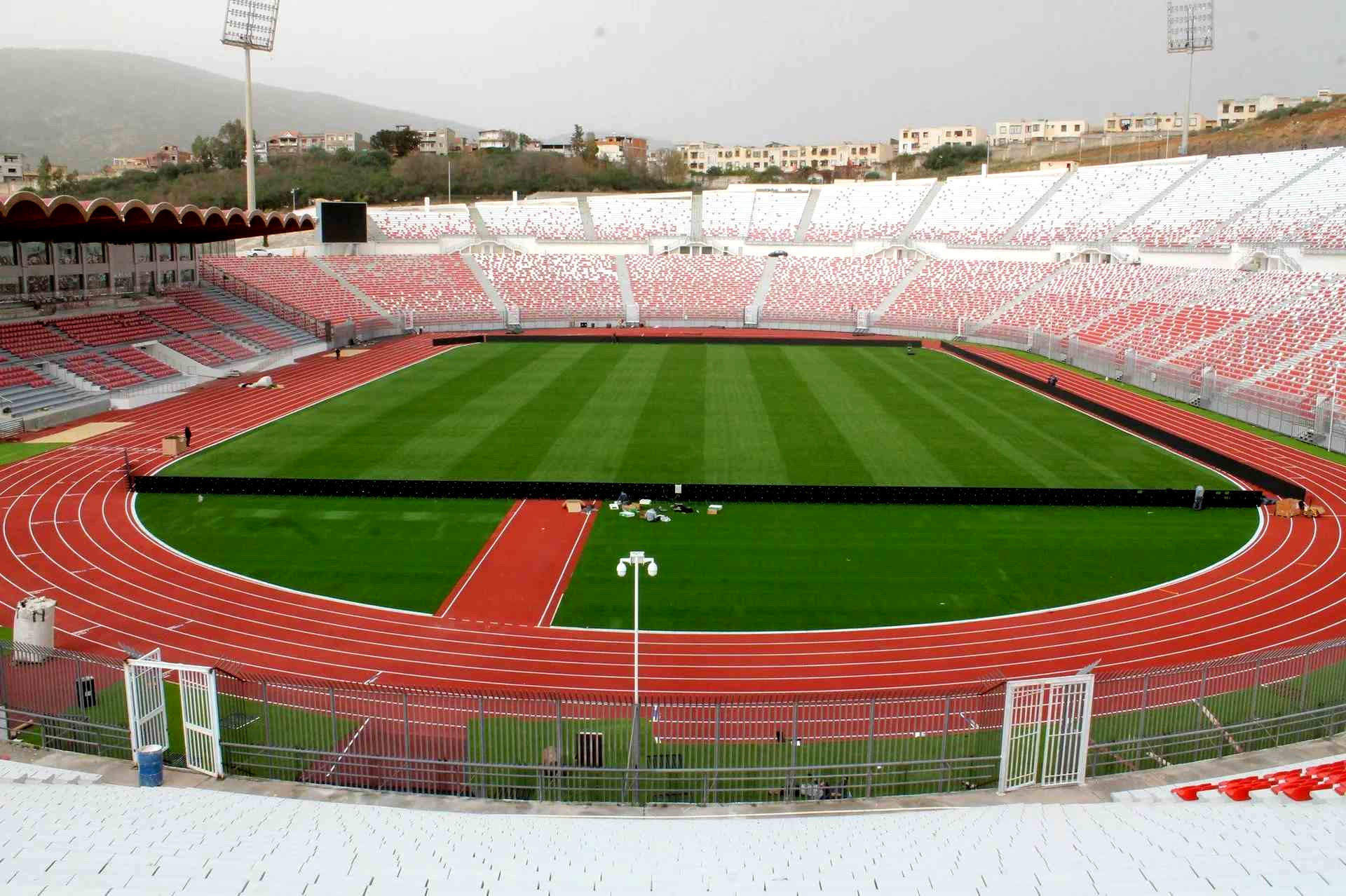
19 May 1956 Stadium
Capacity: 56,000

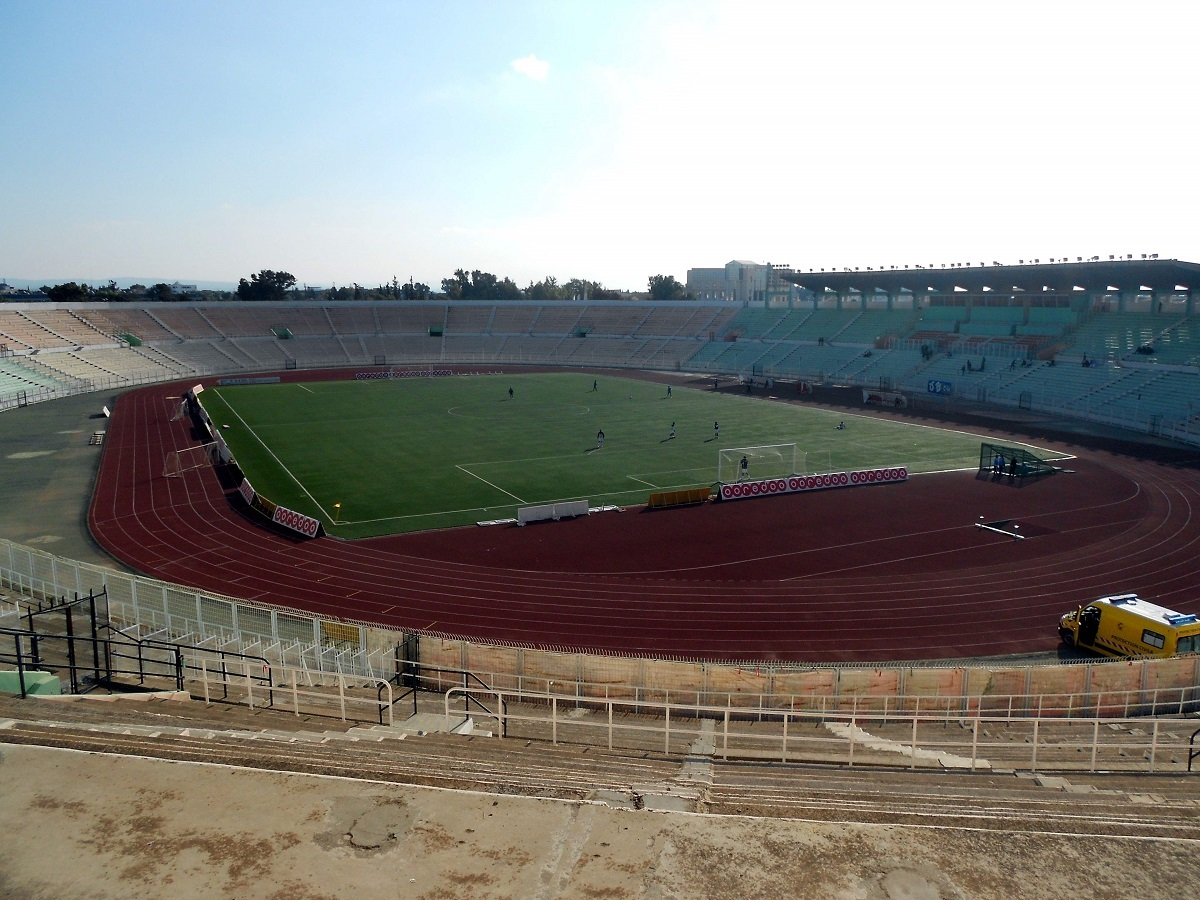
24 February 1956 Stadium
Capacity: 45,000

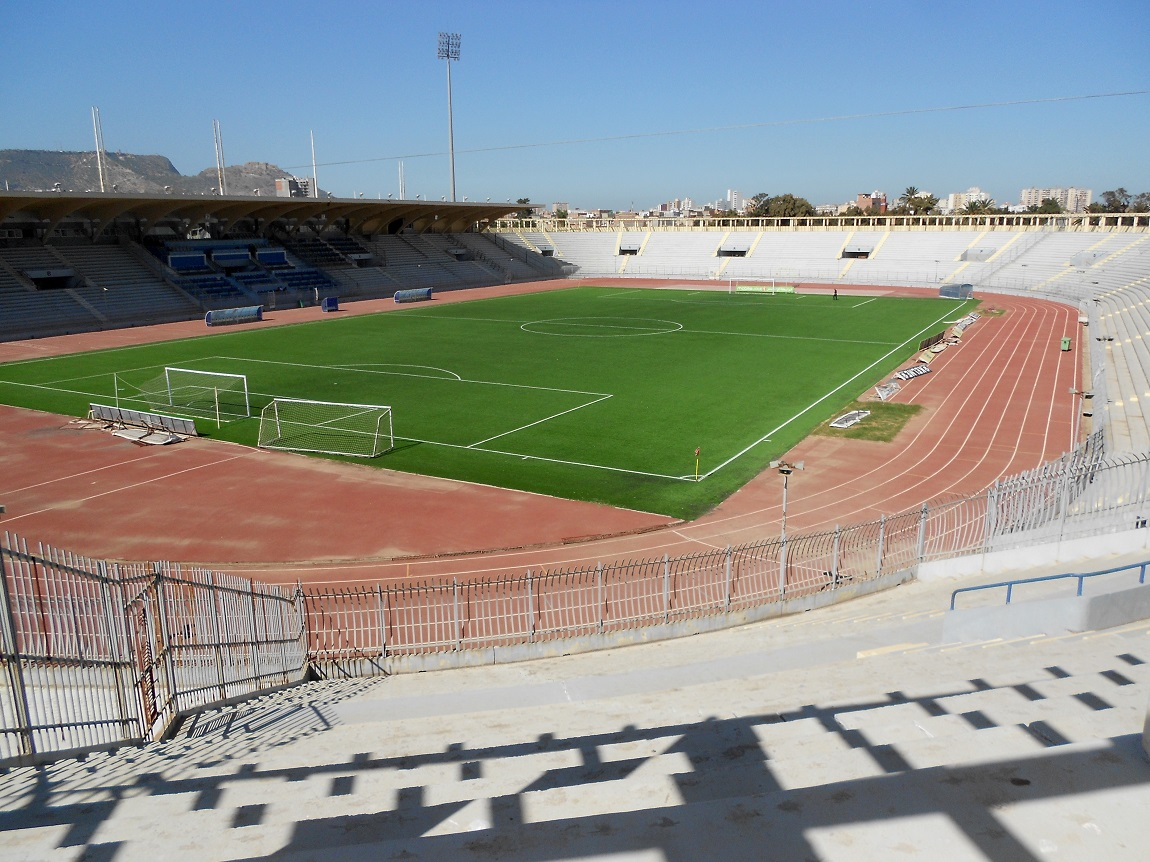
Ahmed Zabana Stadium
Capacity: 40,000

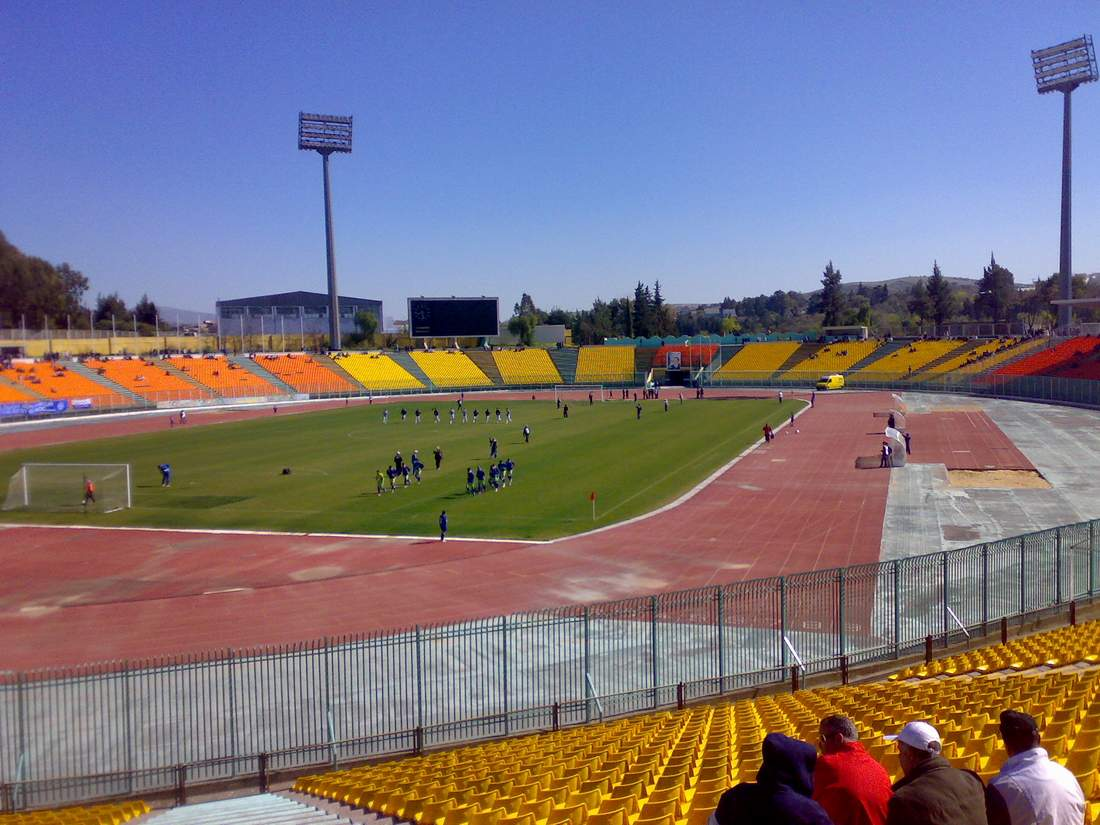
Mohamed Hamlaoui Stadium
Capacity: 22,986
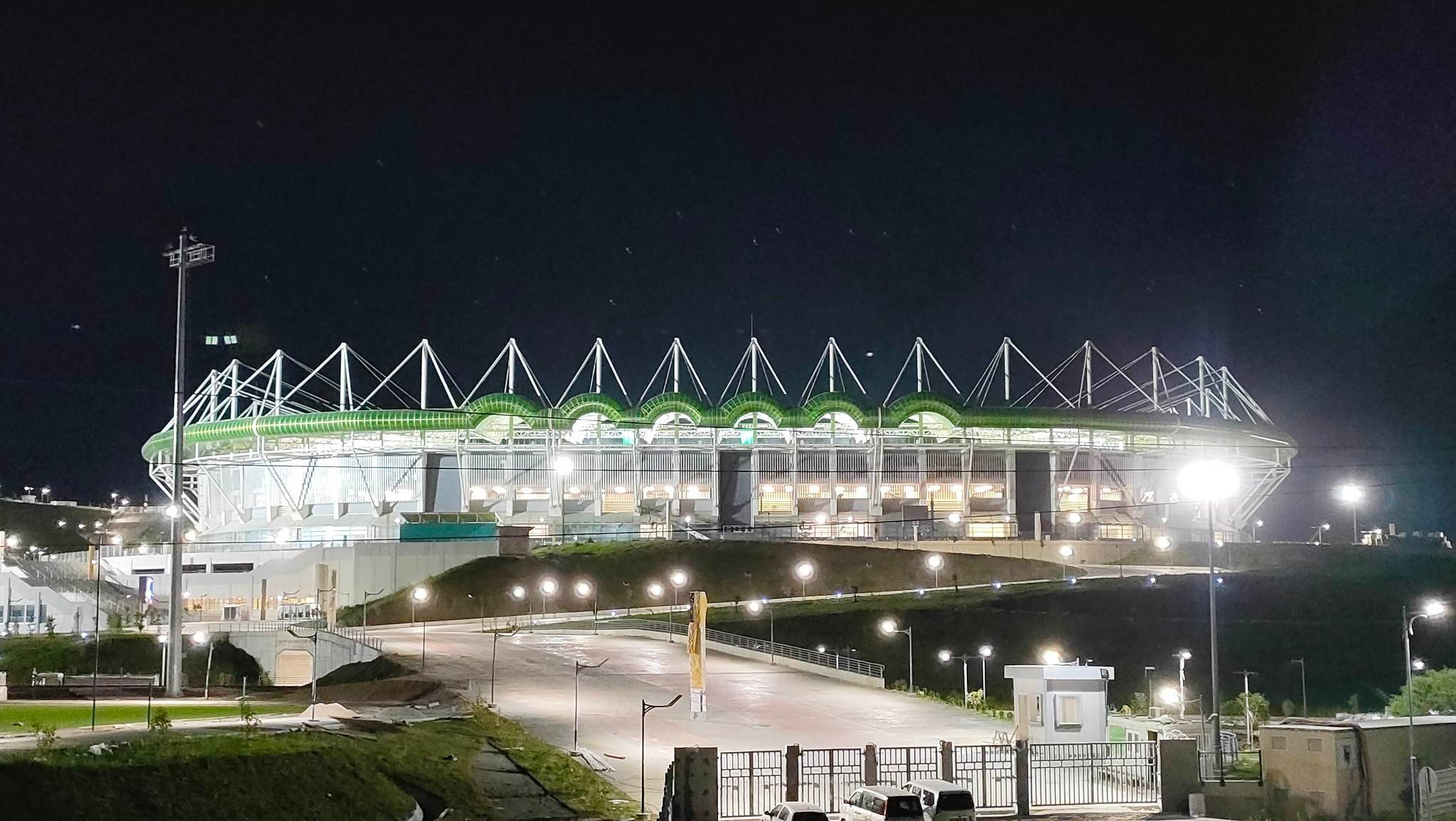
Hocine Aït Ahmed Stadium
Capacity: 50,766

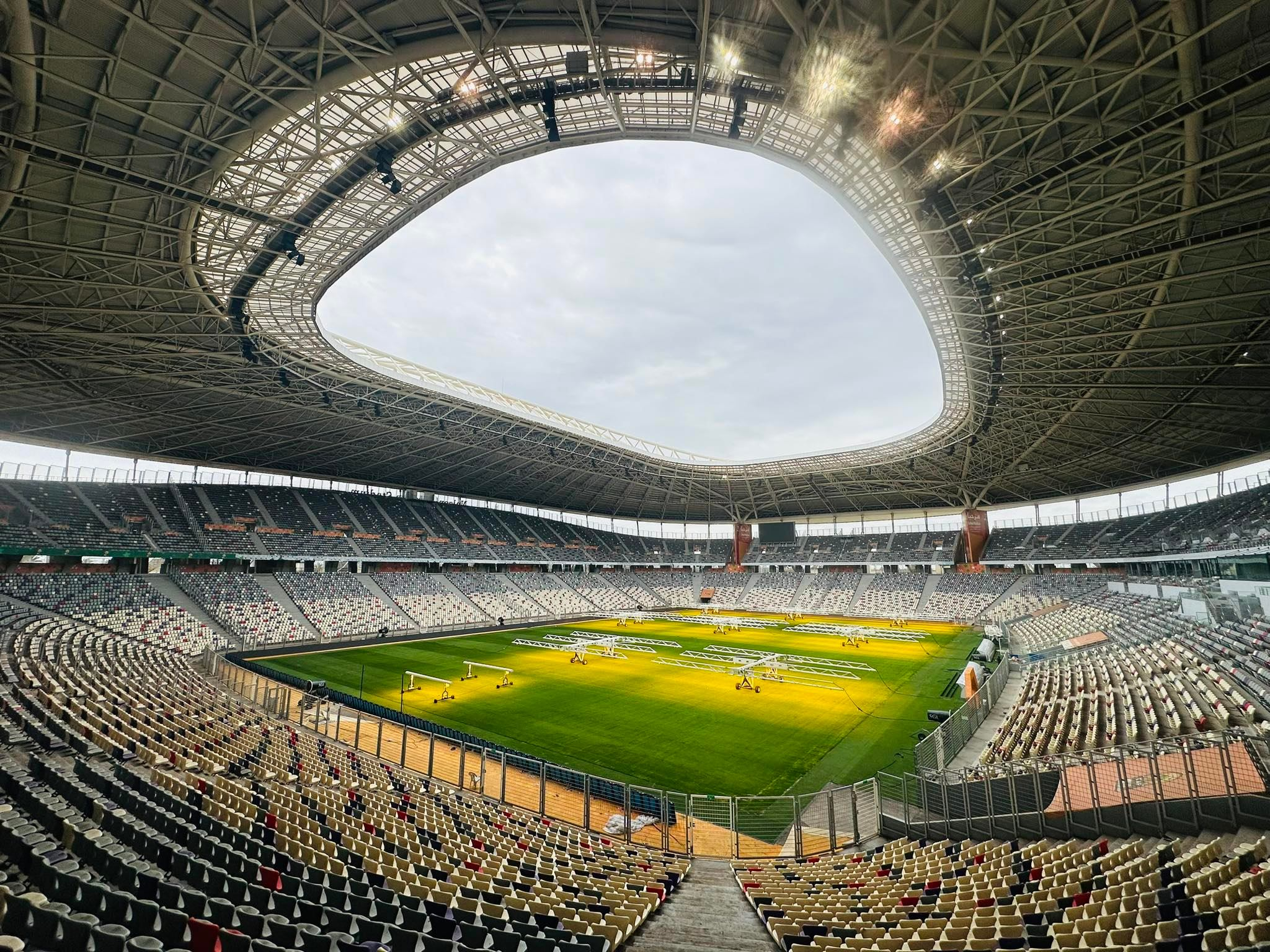
Nelson Mandela Stadium
Capacity: 40,784

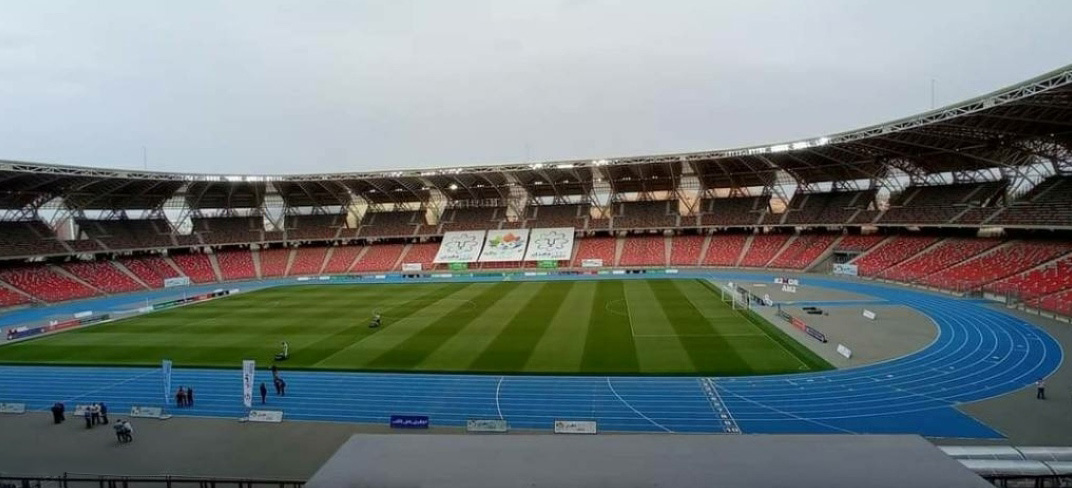
Miloud Hadefi Stadium
Capacity: 40,143

== Support ==
Twitter research from 2015 found that the most popular English Premier League club in Algeria was by far Arsenal, with 43% of Algerian Premier League fans following the club, followed by Chelsea (19%) and Manchester City (11%).

== Attendances ==
The average attendance per top-flight football league season and the club with the highest average attendance:

Season	League average	Best club	Best club average
2024-25	9,368	MC Alger	40,742

Source: League page on Wikipedia

== See also ==
- List of football stadiums in Algeria
