= Faouzi Chaouchi =

Algerian footballer (born 1984)

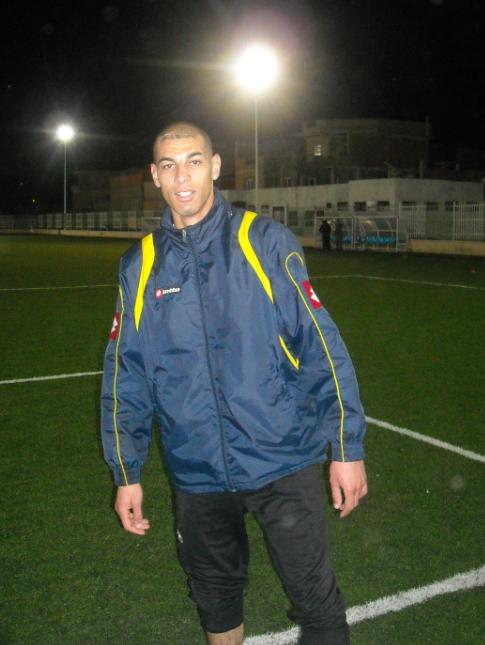

Personal information
- Date of birth: 5 December 1984 (age 41)
- Place of birth: Bordj Ménaïel, Algeria
- Height: 1.94 m (6 ft 4 in)
- Position: Goalkeeper

Team information
- Current team: USM El Harrach
- Number: 1

Youth career
- –2003: Bordj Ménaïel

Senior career*
Years	Team	Apps	(Gls)
2003–2006	JS Bordj Ménaïel	87	(0)
2006–2009	JS Kabylie	108	(1)
2009–2011	ES Sétif	36	(0)
2011–2013	MC Alger	83	(1)
2014–2018	MC Alger	76	(0)
2018–2020	CA Bordj Bou Arréridj	26	(0)
2022–2024	JS Bordj Ménaïel	0	(0)
2024-	USM El Harrach	0	(0)

International career^{‡}
2008–2018	Algeria	15	(0)
- * Club domestic league appearances and goals as of 25 August 2022 ‡ National team caps and goals as of 27 March 2018

Faouzi Chaouchi (Arabic: فوزي شاوشي; born 5 December 1984) is an Algerian professional footballer who plays as a goalkeeper for USM El Harrach.

Chaouchi is considered to be national hero by many Algerians, as he put in a heroic performance in the play-off that put the Algerian national team into their first World Cup since 1986 at the expense of their bitter rivals Egypt. He constantly denied the Egyptian national team all scoring opportunities. Chaouchi was only 23 years of age at the time of the play-off and played in place of suspended Lounès Gaouaoui. It was only Chaouchi's third cap during the unforgettable night in Al Merreikh Stadium, Omdurman (Sudan). In 2010, Chaouchi was known to have been Algeria's highest-paid footballer, earning roughly around 13 million Algerian dinars.

== Early life ==
Born in Bordj Ménaïel, Boumerdès, Chaouchi was born to Houria and Rachid Chaouchi a former goalkeeper himself that played for JS Bordj Ménaïel. It was his father Rachid Chaouchi that noticed Faouzi's talent when he watched him play with other children in their neighbourhood.

"I supervised from a distance and discretion to perceive, in fact, he had good arrangements to move to the position of goalie".

— Rachid Chaouchi

A few days later Faouzi asked his father if he could sign the authorization form so that he could join the JS Bordj Ménaïel youth team. According to his mother he abandoned his education in favour of having a career in what he loved most – football, which angered her at the time, but acknowledged that she knew he had a great future ahead of him in football at the time.

== Club career ==
=== JS Bordj Ménaïel ===
Chaouchi began his career playing for his hometown club JS Bordj Ménaïel. He was the captain of the team during the 2005/06 season. His good form that season, conceding just seven goals in 32 games, had begun to create interest from other clubs.

=== JS Kabylie ===
Chaouchi signed for JS Kabylie from Inter-Régions club JS Bordj Ménaïel in 2006. It was confirmed that the goalkeeper was joining after agreeing terms and signing a three-year contract. He was pleased to be joining such a club

"It's a childhood dream come true, especially since I have been very well received by the players of JS Kabylie".

— Faouzi Chaouchi

He won the Algerian Championnat National in 2008, which was his greatest achievement as well as the highlight of his three-season spell at the club from 2006 to 2009. He is also remembered by the canary fans for scoring a penalty against Cotonsport Garoua in the CAF Champions League with a powerful shot. He was nicknamed “The Canary” by the supporters of the club and is fondly remembered.

Whilst at JS Kabylie, Chaouchi was rumoured to be leaving the club at the end of the season and had talks with various clubs such as Lille OSC, ES Sétif and MC Alger. Chaouchi had a string of discipline problems with manager's and the team president since replacing Gaouaoui in the starting line up in the 2007–08 season.

=== ES Sétif ===
Chaouchi signed for ES Sétif in June 2009, after the club won the race to recruit the goalkeeper who was known for his outstanding performances at JS Kabylie, where he had shown his abilities and his dramatic shot stopping. He was also known for his extrovert humour prior to making his move to ES Sétif.

In December 2009, Chaouchi helped his side win the North African Cup of Champions tournament by beating ES Tunis in the final, after a penalty shoot-out. Chaouchi was selected as the best goalkeeper in the tournament. On 1 May 2010, Chaouchi played in the final of the Algerian Cup (coupe d'Algerie) against CA Batna by winning 3–0 and helping the club lift the Algerian Cup for the first time in twenty years and the seventh in their history, with the last being in 1989. The Algerian president Abdelaziz Bouteflika presented the trophy with the head of state presenting the medals.

In 2009, a number of European clubs had shown an interest in Chaouchi, predominantly Olympique de Marseille. In 2010, during an interview a few days after the win against CA Batna in the Algerian Cup final he was asked if he had received any new offers from clubs abroad, he replied by confirming that his agent had been informed that representatives from Marseille would be attending the friendly between the Republic of Ireland and Algeria in Dublin on 28 May 2010 to have another look at him. whilst also confirming that he is still in contact with French club Le Mans since the previous transfer window. He also confirmed he had just received a proposal from a club in the gulf, but didn't want to mention the club as he had no interest in joining any Arabian clubs as he wanted to join an ambitious club based in Europe.

On 17 October 2010, there were reports that Chaouchi was involved in a car accident. These reports were verified, stating that Chaouchi was involved in a minor car accident whilst visiting family and friends in his home-town Bordj Ménaïel. According to the reports he did not sustain any serious injuries, but the car was damaged beyond repair.

On 30 November, the Ligue National de football disciplinary committee decided to give a one match ban to Chaouchi, and a fine of 20.000,00 Algerian dinars along with Khaled Lemmouchia for contesting the decision of the penalty against AS Khroub, which ended 3–3. He was suspended for the game against MC Oran.

=== MC Alger ===
On 19 July 2011, Chaouchi joined MC Alger, signing a one-year contract with the club. In June 2012, Chaouchi flew to Turkey to negotiate contract offers with newly promoted Süper Lig clubs Elazığspor and Kasımpaşa S.K.

== International career ==
Chaouchi received his first call-up to the Algerian national team on 4 February 2008 for training which was due to be held in France, after his good form for club JS Kabylie did not go unnoticed by the national team coach Rabah Saâdane. On 26 March 2008, he made his debut for Algeria in a friendly against DR Congo coming on as a substitute at half-time for Lounès Gaouaoui.

On 18 November 2009, Chaouchi was selected to play fierce rivals Egypt in what was to be the most important match of his football career, the reward being the remaining African place for the 2010 World Cup finals as first-choice goalkeeper Gaouaoui was ruled out through suspension. Chaouchi put in a heroic performance in the play-off as he constantly denied Egypt to send Algeria through to the 2010 FIFA World Cup, with the final score being 1–0 with centre-back Antar Yahia scoring the only goal with a stunning first-half volley at an angle eight yards out from Karim Ziani's punt into the box. After his heroic performance Chaouchi gave Saâdane something to think about whilst preparing for the 2010 African Cup of Nations.

In December 2009, Chaouchi was selected by Saâdane to play in the 2010 African Cup of Nations hosted in Angola. He was normally regarded as second-choice goalkeeper under coach Saâdane, who had been using Gaouaoui as his first-choice goalkeeper, but due to Chaouchi's heroic performance in Khartoum and Gaouaoui withdrawing from the 2010 African Cup of Nations due to an attack of acute appendicitis, Saâdane did not hesitate in using Chaouchi as first-choice goalkeeper in the 2010 African Cup of Nations. Chaouchi's sending off in the semi-final against Egypt for receiving two cautions along with his head-butting of referee Coffi Codjia saw him earn a suspension for 3 matches and $10,000 fine from CAF.

Chaouchi started his country's first match of the World Cup against Slovenia and was at fault for the Slovenian winner scored by captain Robert Koren. The goalkeeper allowed the shot to squirm past his body, condemning Algeria to a 1–0 defeat. He was replaced by Rais M'Bohli for the match against England.

== Career statistics ==
Appearances and goals by club, season and competition
Club	Season	League			Algerian Cup		Africa		Total	
Club	Season	Division	Apps	Goals	Apps	Goals	Apps	Goals	Apps	Goals
JS Bordj Ménaïel	2003–04	Ligue Inter-Régions			–		–			
JS Bordj Ménaïel	2004–05	Ligue Inter-Régions			–		–			
JS Bordj Ménaïel	2005–06	Ligue Inter-Régions	32	0	–		–		32	0
JS Bordj Ménaïel	Total									
JS Kabylie	2006–07	Championnat National	23	0	3	0	11	0	37	0
JS Kabylie	2007–08	Championnat National	24	0			4	1		-
JS Kabylie	2008–09	Championnat National	29	0	0	0	2	0	31	0
JS Kabylie	Total		76	0	3	0	17	1	96	1
ES Sétif	2009–10	Championnat National	19	0	4	0	4	0	27	0
ES Sétif	2010–11	Ligue 1	13	0	1	0			10	0
ES Sétif	Total		32	0	5	0	4	0	41	0
Career total			131	0		0		0		0

== Honours ==
JS Kabylie

- Algerian Championnat National: 2007–08

ES Sétif

- Algerian Championnat National runner-up: 2009–10
- North African Cup of Champions: 2009
- Algerian Cup: 2009–10
- North African Super Cup: 2010
- North African Cup Winners Cup: 2010
