= Noureddine Zekri =

Algerian football manager

Personal information
- Date of birth: 4 November 1964 (age 61)
- Place of birth: Batna, Algeria

Managerial career
- Years: Team
- 2000: Brera
- 2005–2007: Brera
- 2009–2010: ES Sétif
- 2011–2011: MC Alger
- 2012–2013: Al-Ahly Shendi
- 2013–2014: Al-Raed
- 2014–2015: Al-Wakrah
- 2018–2019: ES Sétif
- 2019: Al-Fayha
- 2019–2021: Damac
- 2024: Al-Okhdood
- 2024–2025: Al-Kholood
- 2026: Al-Shabab

Noureddine Zekri (born 1964 in Batna) is an Algerian football manager.

== Managerial career ==
Zekri gained his coaching badges, a UEFA Pro License, in Italy's famous football coaching centre, the FIGC Settore Tecnico Coverciano.

=== Brera Calcio ===
Zekri started coaching the newly born Milan-based team Brera Calcio in 2000 in Serie D, but he was sacked shortly after and replaced with Walter Zenga. He returned to Brera Calcio in the 2005–06 season and the following season succeeded in getting the team promoted from Prima Categoria to Promozione, resigning immediately after.

=== ES Sétif ===
On December 8, 2009, Zekri was announced as the coach of Algerian club ES Sétif.

In his first season with Zekri, the club won the Algerian Cup, the North African Cup of Champions and the North African Super Cup.

However, On August 18, 2010, Zekri was sacked from his managerial position due to the poor results gained in the 2010 CAF Champions League group stage, picking up just one point out of the first three group matches. The 1–0 loss against Zimbabwe side Dynamos was the final straw for ES Sétif president Abdelhakim Serrar.

=== MC Alger ===
On March 11, 2011, Zekri was appointed as the coach of MC Alger, replacing outgoing Frenchman Alain Michel. He signed a 16-month contract with the club. In his first game as manager, MC Alger lost 4–1 to Dynamos F.C. of Zimbabwe in the first round of the 2011 CAF Champions League. However, the team managed to win the return leg 3–0 to qualify to the next round. On July 10, 2011, Zekri resigned from his position.

=== Al-Okhdood ===
On 17 April 2024, Zekri was appointed as manager of Saudi Pro League club Al-Okhdood until the end of the season.

=== Al-Kholood ===
On 13 October 2024, Zekri was appointed as manager of Saudi Pro League club Al-Kholood.

=== Al-Shabab ===
In February 2026, Zekri became the head coach of Saudi club Al-Shabab.

== Managerial statistics ==
As of 26 May 2025

Team	Nat	From	To	Record							
Team	Nat	From	To	G	W	D	L	GF	GA	GD	Win %
ES Sétif	(Algeria)	8 October 2009	18 August 2010	50	29	14	7	83	40	+43	58.00
MC Alger	(Algeria)	6 March 2011	19 July 2011	22	7	11	4	25	20	+5	31.82
Al-Ahly Shendi	(Sudan)	1 July 2012	1 June 2013	38	16	10	12	37	31	+6	42.11
Al-Raed	(Saudi Arabia)	6 June 2013	16 February 2014	25	7	6	12	19	31	−12	28.00
Al-Wakrah	(Qatar)	6 November 2014	19 February 2015	8	2	3	3	11	15	−4	25.00
ES Sétif	(Algeria)	24 November 2018	5 February 2019	9	5	1	3	11	6	+5	55.56
Al-Fayha	(Saudi Arabia)	5 February 2019	17 May 2019	12	5	2	5	18	17	+1	41.67
Damac	(Saudi Arabia)	5 October 2019	4 January 2021	39	12	9	18	55	69	−14	30.77
Al-Okhdood	(Saudi Arabia)	17 April 2024	1 June 2024	7	2	3	2	11	7	+4	28.57
Al-Kholood	(Saudi Arabia)	13 October 2024	30 June 2025	28	11	3	14	35	52	−17	39.29
Career totals				238	96	62	80	305	288	+17	40.34

== Honours ==
=== Manager ===
ES Sétif

- Algerian Cup: 2009–10
- North African Cup of Champions: 2009
- North African Super Cup: 2010
