= Giovanni Solinas =

Italian football manager

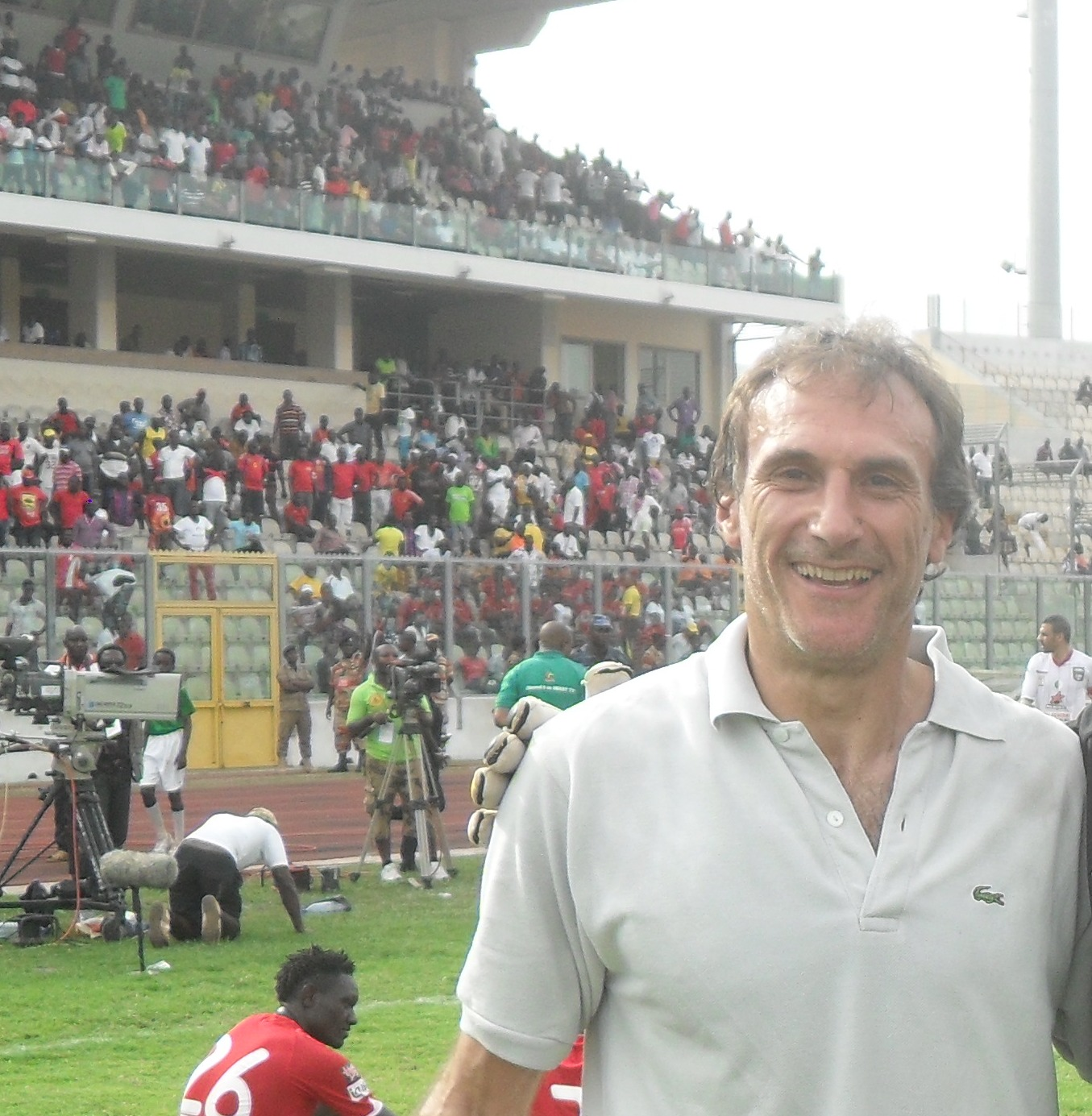
- Solinas

Personal information
- Date of birth: 11 April 1968 (age 58)
- Place of birth: Sassari, Italy
- Height: 1.78 m (5 ft 10 in)

Team information
- Current team: Al-Faisaly (manager)

Managerial career
- Years: Team
- 2010: ES Sétif
- 2011: CR Belouizdad
- 2013: JSM Béjaïa
- 2013: MC Oran
- 2013–2014: Al-Faisaly
- 2015–2016: Free State Stars
- 2016–2017: Free State Stars
- 2017: Al-Faisaly
- 2018: Kaizer Chiefs
- 2019: Al-Adalah FC
- 2021: CS Sfaxien
- 2023: Al-Faisaly
- 2023–2024: Al-Najma
- 2024–2025: Al-Merrikh
- 2025–2026: Al-Faisaly

Giovanni Solinas, also known as Gianni Solinas, (born 11 April 1968) is an Italian football manager. He has managed teams in Algeria, Saudi Arabia, South Africa and Sudan.

== Managerial career ==
Solinas obtained his coaching license UEFA A and UEFA Pro Licence with the Italian Football Federation at the prestigious school of Italian coaches FIGC settore tecnico Coverciano. He Coached several clubs in Algeria including ES Sétif, CR Belouizdad, JSM Bejaia and MC Oran. He also managed Al-Faisaly FC (Harmah) in Saudi Arabia.

=== ES Sétif ===
In 2010, Solinas moved to Africa where he was appointed as head coach of Algerian club ES Sétif when the president of the club Abdelhakim Serrar, offered him the managerial role. On 27 August 2010, he made his debut with a brilliant 3–0 in the return leg the group stage of 2010 CAF Champions League against Zimbabwe side Dynamos F.C. In December 2010, Solinas led ES Sétif to win the North African Cup Winners Cup, also known as the UNAF Nessma Cup, beating Libyan side Al-Nasr Benghazi in the final. After the success, on 22 December 2010, he resigned citing family reasons. Despite the team was at the top of the league table.

=== CR Belouizdad ===
In July 2011, he came back to North Africa where he reached an agreement with Algerian club CR Belouizdad to become the head coach of the club succeeding at the Argentine Miguel Angel Gamondi but in November 2011, he resigned.

=== JSM Béjaïa ===
In January 2013, he was appointed as manager of the club JSM Béjaïa in the Algerian Ligue Professionnelle 1, to replace the Frenchman coach Alain Michel. During his time with the club, Solinas guided JSM Béjaïa to a historic qualification into the 1/8th final of the 2013 CAF Champions League beating Ghana champions, Asante Kotoko SC with a favorable aggregate score of 2–1, where JSM Béjaïa lost against Tunisia giants Espérance de Tunis relegating them to the Confederation Cup. He finished the season by leading JSM Béjaïa against Tunisian side Etoile du Sahel in an CAF Confederation Cup play-off.

=== MC Oran ===
In late June 2013, he reached an agreement with Algerian club MC Oran to become the head coach of the club, but In November 2013, he was sacked after his defeat 0–1 in the championship against USM Alger.

=== Al-Faisaly FC (Harmah) ===
In December 2013, Solinas moved to the Middle East where he was appointed as manager of Saudi club Al-Faisaly FC (Harmah) replacing the Belgian manager Marc Brys. The club was involved in a relegation fight, he saved the club from relegation with a sixth-place finish in the league table.

Solinas led Al-Faisaly FC to qualify for the 2015 GCC Champions League formerly known as the Gulf Cup for Clubs.

=== Free State Stars ===
In December 2015 South African club Free State Stars F.C. announced Solinas as new head coach, with former Bafana Bafana international Bradley Carnell as an assistant. He replaced German football manager Ernst Middendorp as head coach of the club.

Solinas went back as head coach on 30 September 2016, On 11 January, Solinas left Free State Stars with the mutual termination of the contract.

=== Al-Faisaly FC (Harmah) - return ===
Solinas returned to Al-Faisaly on 1 March 2017. The club was involved in a relegation fight, he saved the club from relegation.

=== Kaizer Chiefs ===
Solinas was appointed the head Coach of Kaizer Chiefs, during the 2018/2019 season. On 7 December 2018, Kaizer Chiefs and Solinas agreed the termination of his contract. He did not finish the season with Kaizer Chiefs.

=== CS Sfaxien ===
Solinas was appointed head coach of the club in 2021.

=== Al-Faisaly FC (Harmah) - second return ===
On 16 March 2023, Solinas was appointed as the manager of Al-Faisaly for the third time.

=== Al-Najma ===
On 7 September 2023, Solinas was appointed as manager of Al-Najma.

=== Al-Merrikh ===
On 13 July 2024, Solinas was appointed as manager of Sudanese club Al-Merrikh SC.

=== Al-Faisaly FC (Harmah) - third return ===
On 27 July 2025, Solinas was appointed as manager of Al-Faisaly for the fourth time.
