= 2010 North African Super Cup =

ES Sétif	CS Sfaxien
(Algeria)	(Tunisia)
1	0
- Date: 8 August 2010
- Venue: Stade 8 Mai 1945, Sétif, Algeria
- Referee: Mohammed Rajab (Libya)
- Weather: 19 °C (66 °F), Clear

The 2010 North African Super Cup was the first edition of the competition initiated by the North African Football Union (UNAF), an annual football match between the winners of the previous season's North African Cup and North African Cup Winners Cup competitions.

The match was contested by 2009 North African Cup of Champions winners, ES Sétif, and 2009 North African Cup Winners Cup Champions, CS Sfaxien at the Stade 8 Mai 1945 in Sétif on 8 August 2010. ES Sétif won with a goal from forward Nabil Hemani in the 86th minute.

== Match details ==
8 August 2010
20:45 CET

ES Sétif	1 – 0	CS Sfaxien
Hemani 86'

Stade 8 Mai 1945, Sétif
Referee: Mohammed Rajab (Libya)

ES SÉTIF:
GK	1	(Algeria) Fawzi Chaouchi
RB	17	(Algeria) Slimane Raho
CB	4	(Algeria) Abdelkader Laïfaoui
CB	6	(Algeria) Farouk Belkaid
LB	23	(Algeria) Hocine Metref
DM	8	(Algeria) Khaled Lemmouchia
DM	21	(Algeria) Mehdi Kacem	(substituted off) 65'
CM	10	(Algeria) Lazhar Hadj Aïssa (c)
RW	15	(Algeria) Bouazza Feham
LW	30	(Algeria) Abdelmoumene Djabou	(substituted off) 79'
FW	26	(Algeria) Youcef Ghazali	(substituted off) 65'
Substitutes:
RB		(Algeria) Abderahmane Hachoud	(substituted in) 65'
RW	16	(Algeria) Moustapha Djallit	(substituted in) 79'
FW	29	(Algeria) Nabil Hemani	(substituted in) 65'
Manager:
(Algeria) Noureddine Zekri

CS SFAXIEN:
GK	1	(Tunisia) Slim Rebaï
20	(Tunisia) Hamdi Bouzidi
7	(Tunisia) Ali Maâloul
33	(Tunisia) Hamdi Rouid
32	(Tunisia) Mahmoud Ben Salah
30	(Tunisia) Amine Abbes
13	(Tunisia) Chedi Hammemi
(Tunisia) Wassim Kammoun
(Tunisia) Seifallah Yahyaoui
30	(Tunisia) Fakhredinne Galbi	(substituted off) 44'
(Nigeria) Uche Agba
Substitutes:
FW	22	(Tunisia) Haykel Guemamdia	(substituted in) 44'
Manager:
(France) Pierre Lechantre

MATCH OFFICIALS

- Assistant referees:
  - Nasreddine Grim (Libya)
  - Barghathi (Libya)
- Fourth official: Mokhtar Amalou (Algeria)

MATCH RULES

- 90 minutes.
- Penalty shoot-out if scores level after 90 minutes.
- Seven named substitutes
- Maximum of six substitutions.

== Champions ==
2010 North African Super Cup Winners
(Algeria)
ES Sétif
First title

== See also ==
- 2009 North African Cup of Champions
- 2009 North African Cup Winners Cup
