= Bouazza Feham =

Algerian footballer (born 1986)

Personal information
- Full name: Bouazza Feham
- Date of birth: April 11, 1986 (age 40)
- Place of birth: Oran, Algeria
- Height: 1.70 m (5 ft 7 in)
- Position: Midfielder

Team information
- Current team: IRB El Kerma (head coach)

Senior career*
Years	Team	Apps	(Gls)
2004–2005	ASM Oran	-	(-)
2005–2006	USM Blida	23	(2)
2006–2008	MC Oran	62	(8)
2008–2011	ES Sétif	108	(9)
2011–2015	USM Alger	115	(10)
2015–2017	CR Belouizdad	63	(15)
2017	Al-Wehda	-	(-)
2018	Al-Hazm	-	(-)
2018	MC Oran	9	(0)
2019	MO Béjaïa	0	(0)
2019–2021	RC Relizane		
2021–2022	MO Constantine		

International career^{‡}
2008	Algeria U23	8	(1)
2008–2011	Algeria A'	10	(0)

Managerial career
- 2023–: IRB El Kerma
- * Club domestic league appearances and goals as of 5 February 2025 (UTC) ‡ National team caps and goals as of 12 March 2012 (UTC)

Bouazza Feham (Arabic: بوعزة فاهم; born April 11, 1986) is a former Algerian international footballer played as a midfielder and currently manager.

== Club career ==
On June 9, 2011, Feham signed a one-year contract with USM Alger, joining them on a free transfer from ES Sétif.

== International career ==
Feham first represented Algeria at the Under-20 level, taking part in a tournament in Rezé, France. He would later receive call ups to the Under-21 team and the Under-23 team, participating in the 2005 Islamic Games in Saudi Arabia.

On April 22, 2008, he was called up on stand-by for the Algerian A' National Team in its qualifier against Morocco. However, he did not end up playing in the game.

== Managerial career ==
On 2023, Bouazza Fahem on his first experience, became the manager of IRB El Kerma in the Inter-Régions Division (third division).

== Honours ==
=== Club ===
- Won the Algerian League once with ES Sétif in 2009
- Won the North African Cup of Champions once with ES Sétif in 2009
- Won the North African Super Cup once with ES Sétif in 2010
- Won the Algerian Cup once with ES Sétif in 2010
- Won the North African Cup Winners Cup once with ES Sétif in 2010
- Finalist of the CAF Confederation Cup once with ES Sétif in 2009
- Won the Algerian Cup once with CR Belouizdad in 2017

USM Alger

- Algerian Ligue Professionnelle 1: 2013–14
- Algerian Cup: 2012–13
- Algerian Super Cup: 2013.
- UAFA Club Cup: 2012–13

=== Individual ===
- Chosen as Best Junior Player in Algeria by Le Buteur in 2005
