= 2011 North African Super Cup =

Club Africain	ES Sétif
(Tunisia)	(Algeria)
- Canceled
- Date: March 9, 2011
- Venue: Stade Olympique, Radès

The 2011 North African Super Cup was to have been the second edition of the competition initiated by the North African Football Union (UNAF), an annual football competition between the winners of the previous season's North African Cup and North African Cup Winners Cup competitions. The event was canceled.

The competition would have been contested by the 2010 North African Cup of Champions winners, Club Africain, and the 2010 North African Cup Winners Cup winners, ES Sétif. UNAF had initially announced that, unlike the first edition, the 2011 Super Cup would be played over two legs in January. However, the competition was later planned to be played in a single leg at Stade Olympique de Radès in Tunis. The event was scheduled to occur on March 9; however, the event was indefinitely postponed due to the political situation in Tunisia. Finally, on February 15, 2011, the match was canceled by the UNAF because the Tunisian Football Federation wanted the match to be played behind closed doors.

Normally, the winner of the 2011 North African Super Cup would have participated in the 2011 edition of the Tournament of Paris.

== Participating teams ==
- (Tunisia) Club Africain (2010 North African Cup of Champions winners)
- (Algeria) ES Sétif (2010 North African Cup Winners Cup winners)
