= Mohamed Naouali =

Tunisian footballer (1950–2018)

Personal information
- Date of birth: 1950
- Place of birth: Tunisia
- Date of death: 3 December 2018 (aged 67–68)
- Position: Defender

Senior career*
Years	Team	Apps	(Gls)
1972–1980	Club Africain		
- * Club domestic league appearances and goals

Mohamed Naouali (1950 – 3 December 2018) was a Tunisian footballer, playing at the defender position.

== Biography ==
A defender for Club Africain, Naouali's football career was cut short by injuries. He was selected to the Tunisian National Team for three games in 1974, 1975, and 1978. Naouali won Tunisian Cups in 1973 and 1976 with Club Africain. He also won the Maghreb Champions Cup three times with the club in 1974, 1975, and 1976.
