= 2010–11 USM Annaba season =

USM Annaba
2010–11 season
- Head coach: Mustapha Biskri
- Stadium: Stade 19 Mai 1956
- Ligue 1: 14th
- Algerian Cup: Round of 64
- Top goalscorer: League: Bilel Herbache (3 goals); Amine Boukhlouf (3 goals); Djamel Bouaïcha (3 goals); All: Bilel Herbache (3 goals); Amine Boukhlouf (3 goals); Djamel Bouaïcha (3 goals)

In the 2010–11 season, USM Annaba competed in the Ligue 1 for the 21st season, as well as the Algerian Cup. They competed in Ligue 1, and the Algerian Cup.

== Squad list ==
Players and squad numbers last updated on 18 November 2011.
Note: Flags indicate national team as has been defined under FIFA eligibility rules. Players may hold more than one non-FIFA nationality.

No.	Nat.	Position	Name	Date of birth (age)	Signed from
Goalkeepers
1	(Algeria)	GK	El Hadi Fayçal Ouadah	24 September 1983 (aged 27)	(Algeria) MC Saida
23	(Algeria)	GK	Hacen Houamed	23 March 1979 (aged 31)	(Algeria) MSP Batna
Defenders
5	(Algeria)	CB	Abdelkader Messaoudi	15 June 1986 (aged 24)	(Algeria) CR Temouchent
3	(Algeria)	LB	Abdelhak Mansour	4 March 1985 (aged 25)	(Algeria) CA Bordj Bou Arreridj
18	(Algeria)	RB	Ouissem Mokrane	1 January 1987 (aged 24)	(Algeria) USM El Harrach
14	(Algeria)	LB	Zineddine Mekkaoui	10 January 1987 (aged 23)	(Algeria) NA Hussein Dey
20	(Algeria)	CB	Mourad Boudjelida	10 June 1984 (aged 26)	(Algeria) MC El Eulma
13	(Algeria)	CB	Abdelaziz Ali Guechi	7 September 1990 (aged 20)	(Algeria) Youth system
2	(Algeria)	RB	Fayçal Ammari	25 August 1984 (aged 26)	(Algeria) Hamra Annaba
22	(Algeria)	LB	Samir Belkheir	9 November 1985 (aged 25)	(Algeria) USM Bel Abbès
	(Algeria)	RB	Khaled Toubal	28 June 1986 (aged 24)	(Algeria) WR Bentalha
Midfielders
	(Algeria)	AM	Bilel Herbache	4 January 1986 (aged 24)	(Algeria) CA Bordj Bou Arreridj
21	(Algeria)		Hamza Ounnas	18 December 1988 (aged 22)	(Algeria) MO Constantine
10	(Algeria)	AM	Abdelhamid Dif	19 October 1987 (aged 23)	(Algeria) WA Tlemcen
8	(Algeria)	AM	Toufik Dif	23 June 1985 (aged 25)	(Algeria) USM Bel Abbès
6	(Algeria)	DM	Sofiane Bouterbiat	5 December 1983 (aged 27)	(Algeria) MO Constantine
11	(Algeria)	DM	Mohamed Azzeddine Zouaoui	6 June 1990 (aged 20)	(Algeria) ES Sétif U21
Forwards
29	(Algeria)	LW	Djabir Naâmoune	5 April 1987 (aged 23)	(Algeria) MC El Eulma
	(Algeria)	CM	Salah Ben Djoudi Benabdellah	7 June 1987 (aged 23)	(Algeria) CA Bordj Bou Arreridj
12	(Algeria)	FW	Ghiles Benchaàbane	13 September 1989 (aged 21)	(Algeria) USM Alger
19	(Algeria)	RW	Mounir Bakrar	4 March 1984 (aged 26)	(Algeria) MC El Eulma
9	(Algeria)	FW	Amine Boukhlouf	30 January 1984 (aged 26)	(Algeria) CA Batna
17	(Algeria)	LW	Abou Sofiane Balegh	17 August 1988 (aged 22)	(Algeria) MC Oran
25	(Algeria)	FW	Djamel Bouaïcha	19 June 1982 (aged 28)	(Algeria) Paradou AC
7	(Algeria)	FW	Mohamed Salah Boukhari	7 June 1987 (aged 23)	(Algeria) Hamra Annaba
	(Algeria)	FW	Djamel Bouabdallah	31 December 1985 (aged 25)	(Algeria) ?

== Competitions ==
=== Overview ===
Competition	Record								Started round	Final position / round	First match	Last match
Competition	G	W	D	L	GF	GA	GD	Win %	Started round	Final position / round	First match	Last match
Ligue 1	30	10	6	14	23	34	−11	33.33	—N/a	14th	25 September 2010	8 July 2011
Algerian Cup	1	0	1	0	0	0	+0	0.00	Round of 64		31 December 2010	
Total	31	10	7	14	23	34	−11	32.26				

Updated to match played 9 May 2017
Source: Competitions

== League table ==
Pos	Team	Pld	W	D	L	GF	GA	GD	Pts	Qualification or relegation
12	WA Tlemcen	30	10	7	13	35	36	−1	37	
13	MC El Eulma	30	9	9	12	32	40	−8	36	
14	USM Annaba (R)	30	10	6	14	23	34	−11	36	Relegation to Ligue Professionnelle 2
15	CA Bordj Bou Arreridj (R)	30	8	5	17	21	46	−25	29	Relegation to Ligue Professionnelle 2
16	USM Blida (R)	30	7	8	15	16	30	−14	29	Relegation to Ligue Professionnelle 2

Updated to match(es) played on 19 April 2018. Source: DZFoot
Rules for classification: 1) points; 2) head-to-head points; 3) head-to-head goal difference; 4) goal difference; 5) total goals; 6) fairplay ranking; 7) playoff.
(R) Relegated

=== Results summary ===
Overall								Home						Away					
Pld	W	D	L	GF	GA	GD	Pts	W	D	L	GF	GA	GD	W	D	L	GF	GA	GD
30	10	6	14	23	34	−11	36	10	5	0	19	5	+14	0	1	14	4	29	−25

Last updated: 29 December 2014.
Source: Competitive matches

=== Results by round ===
Round	1	2	3	4	5	6	7	8	9	10	11	12	13	14	15	16	17	18	19	20	21	22	23	24	25	26	27	28	29	30
Ground	A	H	A	H	A	H	A	H	A	H	A	H	A	A	H	H	A	H	A	H	A	H	A	H	A	H	A	H	H	A
Result	L	W	L	D	L	D	L	W	D	W	L	D	L	L	W	D	L	W	L	W	L	W	L	W	L	W	L	D	W	L
Position	14	11	13	11	13	13	14	13	12	12	12	12	12	14	11	13	14	11	11	9	12	9	12	9	11	9	12	12	10	14

Source: Competitive matches
A = Away; H = Home; W = Win; D = Draw; L = Loss

=== Matches ===
Win Draw Loss

25 September 2010 Round 1	WA Tlemcen	2–0	USM Annaba	Tlemcen
16:00	Belgherri 40' (pen.); Boukhari 64'	Soccerway report		Stadium: Stade Akid Lotfi; Referee: Mohamed Bichari

1 October 2010 Round 2	USM Annaba	1–0	JSM Béjaïa	Annaba
20:00	Bakrar 29'	Soccerway report		Stadium: Stade 19 Mai 1956; Referee: Farouk Houasnia

16 October 2010 Round 3	USM El Harrach	3–0	USM Annaba	Algiers
16:00	Boualem 1'; Benai 57'; Hanitser 90'	Soccerway report		Stadium: Stade 1er Novembre 1954; Referee: Mohamed Benouza

22 October 2010 Round 4	USM Annaba	1–1	USM Blida	Annaba
19:00	Ounnas 22'	Soccerway report	Djemaouni 90'	Stadium: May 19, 1956 Stadium; Referee: Rafik Achouri

26 October 2010 Round 5	MC Saïda	1–0	USM Annaba	Saida
17:00	Madouni 83'	Soccerway report		Stadium: April 13, 1958 Stadium; Referee: Mokhtar Amalou

29 October 2010 Round 6	USM Annaba	0–0	MC El Eulma	Annaba
19:00		Soccerway report		Stadium: May 19, 1956 Stadium; Referee: Abdelkader Karabi

6 November 2010 Round 7	JS Kabylie	1–0	USM Annaba	Tizi Ouzou
14:30	Aoudia 15' (pen.)	Soccerway report		Stadium: Stade 1er Novembre 1954; Referee: Kadda Babrahim

13 November 2010 Round 8	USM Annaba	3–0	AS Khroub	Annaba
14:30	Ali Guechi 1'; Mekkaoui 20'; Balegh 90' (pen.)	Soccerway report		Stadium: May 19, 1956 Stadium; Referee: Ali Bouali

26 November 2010 Round 9	MC Alger	2–2	USM Annaba	Algiers
19:30	Belkheïr 44'; Boudebouda 80'	Soccerway report	Bouaïcha 25'; Boukhlouf 59'	Stadium: Stade 5 Juillet 1962; Referee: Farouk Mial

3 December 2010 Round 10	USM Annaba	1–0	CR Belouizdad	Annaba
15:00	Boukhari 48'	Soccerway report		Stadium: May 19, 1956 Stadium; Referee: Boubekeur Zouaoui

10 December 2010 Round 11	MC Oran	1–0	USM Annaba	Oran
15:00	Aïssaoui 66'	Soccerway report		Stadium: Ahmed Zabana Stadium; Referee: Mohamed Haddada

18 December 2010 Round 12	USM Annaba	0–0	ASO Chlef	Annaba
14:30		Soccerway report		Stadium: Stade 19 Mai 1956; Referee: Farid Bahloul

24 December 2011 Round 13	CA Bordj Bou Arreridj	1–0	USM Annaba	Bordj Bou Arréridj
18:00	El Hadi 52'	Soccerway report		Stadium: Stade 20 Août 1955; Referee: Mohamed Bichari

8 March 2011 Round 14	ES Sétif	2–1	USM Annaba	Sétif
18:00	Metref 18'; Djabou 19'	Soccerway report	Messaoudi 86'	Stadium: Stade 8 Mai 1945; Referee: Farouk Mial

26 February 2011 Round 15	USM Annaba	1–0	USM Alger	Annaba
14:30	Mekkaoui 69'	Soccerway report		Stadium: Stade 19 Mai 1956; Referee: Mehdi Abid Charef

19 March 2011 Round 16	USM Annaba	1–1	WA Tlemcen	Annaba
14:00	Herbache 44'	Soccerway report	Andria 90+2'	Stadium: Stade 19 Mai 1956; Referee: Merzak Halalchi

29 March 2011 Round 17	JSM Béjaïa	1–0	USM Annaba	Béjaïa
15:30	N'Djeng 76'	Soccerway report		Stadium: Stade de l'Unité Maghrébine; Referee: Bouaza Chenane

2 April 2011 Round 18	USM Annaba	2–1	USM El Harrach	Annaba
15:30	Bouaïcha 85', 90+5'	Soccerway report	Boumechra 56' (pen.)	Stadium: Stade 19 Mai 1956; Referee: Djamel Haimoudi

15 April 2011 Round 19	USM Blida	1–0	USM Annaba	Blida
16:00	Djemaouni 45'	Soccerway report		Stadium: Stade Mustapha Tchaker; Referee: Mohamed Bouhenni

25 April 2011 Round 20	USM Annaba	1–0	MC Saïda	Annaba
17:00	Benchaâbane 82'	Soccerway report		Stadium: May 19, 1956 Stadium; Referee: Rafik Achouri

7 May 2011 Round 21	MC El Eulma	2–0	USM Annaba	El Eulma
17:00	Karaoui 47'; Tiaiba 90+2'	Soccerway report		Stadium: Stade Messaoud Zougar; Referee: Farouk Mial

14 May 2011 Round 22	USM Annaba	2–1	JS Kabylie	Annaba
17:00	Ammari 51'; Boukhlouf 58'	Soccerway report	Nessakh 69'	Stadium: Stade 19 Mai 1956; Referee: Mohamed Sahraoui

21 May 2011 Round 23	AS Khroub	3–1	USM Annaba	El Khroub
17:00	Zouak 19'; Bounab 33'; Mesfar 59'	Soccerway report	Herbache 30' (pen.)	Stadium: Stade Abed Hamdani; Referee: Youssef Zerrouki

28 May 2011 Round 24	USM Annaba	2–1	MC Alger	Annaba
17:00	Boukhlouf 53'; Ali Guechi 84'	Soccerway report	Bouchema 8' (pen.)	Stadium: Stade 19 Mai 1956; Referee: Boubekeur Zouaoui

31 May 2011 Round 25	CR Belouizdad	2–0	USM Annaba	Belouizdad
17:00	Ammour 68'; Slimani 86' (pen.)	Soccerway report		Stadium: Stade 20 Août 1955; Referee: Ali Babou

11 June 2011 Round 26	USM Annaba	2–0	MC Oran	Annaba
18:00	Naâmoune 9'; Herbache 48' (pen.)	Soccerway report		Stadium: Stade 19 Mai 1956; Referee: Sofiane Bousseter

25 June 2011 Round 27	ASO Chlef	4–0	USM Annaba	Chlef
18:00	Seguer 5'; Soudani 10', 90'; Messaoud 47'	Soccerway report		Stadium: Stade Mohamed Boumezrag; Referee: Farouk Houasnia

28 June 2011 Round 28	USM Annaba	0–0	CA Bordj Bou Arreridj	Annaba
18:00		Soccerway report		Stadium: May 19, 1956 Stadium; Referee: Khaled Saâdi

1 July 2011 Round 29	USM Annaba	2–0	ES Sétif	Annaba
18:00	Benabdellah 23'; Bakrar 76'	Soccerway report		Stadium: May 19, 1956 Stadium; Referee: Mohamed Bichari

8 July 2011 Round 30	USM Alger	3–0	USM Annaba	Bologhine
17:00	Cheklam 30' (yellow card) 14'; Meklouche 38', 57'	Soccerway report		Stadium: Omar Hamadi Stadium; Referee: Mohamed Benouza

== Algerian Cup ==
31 December 2010 Round of 64	AB Merouana	0–0 (a.e.t.) (3–0 p)	USM Annaba	Merouana
14:15		Report		Stadium: Stade Abderrahmene Bensaci
Note: Lineup for USM Annaba - Ouadah - Ammari, Messouadi, Boudjelida, Mekkaoui - Bouterbiat, Ounnas, Zouaoui (Balegh 53’) - Bouaïcha, Boukhlouf (A. Dif 80’) Bekrar (Benchaâbane 65’).

== Squad information ==
=== Playing statistics ===
No.	Pos	Nat	Player	Total		Ligue 1		Algerian Cup	
No.	Pos	Nat	Player	Apps	Goals	Apps	Goals	Apps	Goals
Goalkeepers
1	GK	(Algeria) ALG	El Hadi Fayçal Ouadah	27	0	26	0	1	0
23	GK	(Algeria) ALG	Hacen Houamed	4	0	4	0	0	0
Defenders
5	DF	(Algeria) ALG	Abdelkader Messaoudi	23	1	22	1	1	0
3	DF	(Algeria) ALG	Abdelhak Mansour	12	0	12	0	0	0
18	DF	(Algeria) ALG	Ouissem Mokrane	2	0	2	0	0	0
14	DF	(Algeria) ALG	Zineddine Mekkaoui	30	2	29	2	1	0
20	DF	(Algeria) ALG	Mourad Boudjelida	26	0	25	0	1	0
13	DF	(Algeria) ALG	Abdelaziz Ali Guechi	20	2	20	2	0	0
2	DF	(Algeria) ALG	Fayçal Ammari	22	1	21	1	1	0
22	DF	(Algeria) ALG	Samir Belkheir	3	0	3	0	0	0
	DF	(Algeria) ALG	Khaled Toubal	8	0	8	0	0	0
	DF	(Algeria) ALG	Aouameur	1	0	1	0	0	0
Midfielders
	MF	(Algeria) ALG	Bilel Herbache	14	3	14	3	0	0
21	MF	(Algeria) ALG	Hamza Ounnas	27	1	26	1	1	0
10	MF	(Algeria) ALG	Abdelhamid Dif	19	0	18	0	1	0
8	MF	(Algeria) ALG	Toufik Dif	6	0	6	0	0	0
6	MF	(Algeria) ALG	Sofiane Bouterbiat	26	0	25	0	1	0
11	MF	(Algeria) ALG	Mohamed Azzeddine Zouaoui	5	0	4	0	1	0
Forwards
29	FW	(Algeria) ALG	Djabir Naâmoune	13	1	13	1	0	0
	FW	(Algeria) ALG	Salah Ben Djoudi Benabdellah	13	1	13	1	0	0
12	FW	(Algeria) ALG	Ghiles Benchaàbane	15	1	14	1	1	0
19	FW	(Algeria) ALG	Mounir Bakrar	30	2	29	2	1	0
9	FW	(Algeria) ALG	Amine Boukhlouf	23	3	22	3	1	0
17	FW	(Algeria) ALG	Abou Sofiane Balegh	17	1	16	1	1	0
25	FW	(Algeria) ALG	Djamel Bouaïcha	24	3	23	3	1	0
7	FW	(Algeria) ALG	Mohamed Salah Boukhari	13	1	13	1	0	0
	FW	(Algeria) ALG	Djamel Bouabdallah	2	0	2	0	0	0
Players transferred out during the season

Last updated: 13 June 2018
Source: fr.soccerway.com

== Transfers ==
=== In ===
Date	Pos	Player	From club	Transfer fee	Source
1 July 2010	DF	(Algeria) Fayçal Ammari	Hamra Annaba	Free transfer	
1 July 2010	DF	(Algeria) Ouissem Mokrane	USM El Harrach	Free transfer	
1 July 2010	DF	(Algeria) Abdelkader Messaoudi	CR Temouchent	Free transfer	
1 July 2010	DF	(Algeria) Mourad Boudjelida	MC El Eulma	Free transfer	
1 July 2010	DF	(Algeria) Zineddine Mekkaoui	NA Hussein Dey	Free transfer	
1 July 2010	DF	(Algeria) Samir Belkheir	USM Bel Abbès	Free transfer	
1 July 2010	DF	(Algeria) Khaled Toubal	WR Bentalha	Free transfer	
1 July 2010	MF	(Algeria) Sofiane Bouterbiat	MO Constantine	Free transfer	
1 July 2010	MF	(Algeria) Hamza Ounnas	MO Constantine	Free transfer	
1 July 2010	MF	(Algeria) Toufik Dif	USM Bel Abbès	Free transfer	
1 July 2010	FW	(Algeria) Ghiles Benchaàbane	USM Alger	Free transfer	
1 July 2010	FW	(Algeria) Abou Sofiane Balegh	MC Oran	Free transfer	
1 July 2010	FW	(Algeria) Mohamed Salah Boukhari	Hamra Annaba	Free transfer	
1 July 2010	FW	(Algeria) Djamel Bouaïcha	Paradou AC	Free transfer	
1 July 2010	FW	(Algeria) Amine Boukhlouf	CA Batna	Free transfer	
1 January 2011	MF	(Algeria) Bilel Herbache	CA Bordj Bou Arreridj	Free transfer	
1 January 2011	FW	(Algeria) Salah Ben Djoudi Benabdellah	CA Bordj Bou Arreridj	Free transfer	
1 January 2011	FW	(Algeria) Djabir Naâmoune	MC El Eulma	Free transfer	

=== Out ===
Date	Pos	Player	To club	Transfer fee	Source
27 June 2010	DF	(Algeria) Adel Maïza	JSM Béjaïa	Free transfer	
27 June 2010	FW	(Algeria) Ahmed Gasmi	JSM Béjaïa	Free transfer	
1 July 2010	MF	(Algeria) Nacer Hammami	MC El Eulma	Free transfer	
1 July 2010	DF	(Algeria) Fayçal Hebbaïche	MC El Eulma	Free transfer	
12 July 2010	DF	(Algeria) Belkacem Remache	JS Kabylie	Free transfer	
