= 2010 North African Cup of Champions =

Tournament details
- Dates: 3 November 2010 – 23 December 2010
- Teams: 4 (from UNAF confederations)

Final positions
- Champions: (Tunisia) Club Africain (2nd title)
- Runners-up: (Algeria) MC Alger

Tournament statistics
- Matches played: 6
- Goals scored: 8 (1.33 per match)
- Top scorer(s): (Tunisia) Wissem Ben Yahia (2)

The 2010 North African Cup of Champions was the third edition of the competition since its inception in 2008. The league champions from Morocco, Algeria, Libya and Tunisia will face off for the title.

Tunisian side Club Africain won the title after defeating MC Alger of Algeria 3-1 on aggregate in the final. It was the second time that the club won the competition.

== Participating teams ==
- (Algeria) MC Alger (2009–10 Algerian Championnat National winners)
- (Libya) Ittihad Tripoli (2009–10 Libyan Premier League winners)
- (Tunisia) Club Africain (2009–10 Tunisian Ligue Professionnelle 1 runners-up)^{1}
- (Morocco) Wydad Casablanca (2009–10 Botola winners)

== Prize money ==
The following prize money will be handed out for the 2010 edition:

- Champions: $150,000
- Runner-up: $80,000
- Semi-finalists: $35,000

== Draw ==
=== Semifinals ===
Team 1	Agg.	Team 2	1st leg	2nd leg
Club Africain (Tunisia)	3–0	(Morocco) Wydad Casablanca	0–0	0–3
Ittihad (Libya)	0–1	(Algeria) MC Alger	0–1	0–0

==== First legs ====
3 November 2010

Club Africain (Tunisia)	0–0	(Morocco) Wydad Casablanca

Stade Olympique d'El Menzah, Tunis

4 November 2010

Ittihad (Libya)	0–1	(Algeria) MC Alger
	Report	Youssef Sofiane 49'

11 June Stadium, Tripoli

==== Second legs ====
12 November 2010

Wydad Casablanca (Morocco)	0–3	(Tunisia) Club Africain
		Wissem Ben Yahia 42', 47'; Khaled Melliti 80' (pen.)

Stade Mohamed V, Casablanca

21 November 2010

MC Alger (Algeria)	0–0	(Libya) Ittihad

Stade Rouiba, Rouiba

=== Final ===
Team 1	Agg.	Team 2	1st leg	2nd leg
Club Africain (Tunisia)	3–1	(Algeria) MC Alger	2-0	1-1

==== First leg ====
10 December 2010

Club Africain (Tunisia)	2–0	(Algeria) MC Alger
Karim Aouadhi 27'; Zouheir Dhaouadi 48'

Stade 7 November, Rades

==== Second leg ====
23 December 2010

MC Alger (Algeria)	1 – 1	(Tunisia) Club Africain
Abdelmalek Mokdad 20'		Amir Akrout 55'

Stade 5 Juillet 1962, Algiers

== Champions ==
2010 North African Cup of Champions Winners
(Tunisia)
Club Africain
Second title

== See also ==
- 2010 North African Cup Winners Cup
- 2011 North African Super Cup
