= 2015 UNAF Club Cup =

كأس إتحاد شمال إفريقيا للأندية 2015

Tournament details
- Host country: Morocco
- City: Casablanca
- Dates: 14 – 19 August 2015
- Teams: 4 (from UNAF confederations)
- Venue(s): 1 (in 1 host city)

Final positions
- Champions: (Morocco) Raja CA (1st title)
- Runners-up: (Egypt) Ismaily SC

Tournament statistics
- Matches played: 6
- Goals scored: 15 (2.5 per match)

The 2015 UNAF Club Cup was the inaugural edition of the UNAF Club Cup. Clubs from Egypt, Libya, Morocco and Tunisia faced off for the title. Algeria withdrew its representative team because of overlapping dates of the competition with the Algerian championship.

== Teams ==
Association	Team	Qualifying method
Algeria	Withdrew	
Egypt	Ismaily SC	2014–15 Egyptian Premier League 6th
Libya	Al-Hilal Benghazi	2013–14 Libyan Premier League third
Morocco	Raja CA	2014–15 Botola 8th & host
Tunisia	Club Africain	2014–15 Tunisian Ligue Professionnelle 1 champion

== Tournament ==
The competition played in a round-robin tournament determined the final standings. It was hosted in Casablanca, Morocco.

=== Standings ===
Team	Pld	W	D	L	GF	GA	GD	Pts
(Morocco) Raja CA	3	2	1	0	3	0	+3	7
(Egypt) Ismaily SC	3	1	1	1	6	3	+3	4
(Tunisia) Club Africain	3	1	1	1	5	5	0	4
(Libya) Al-Hilal Benghazi	3	0	1	2	1	7	−6	1

=== Matches ===
Team 1	Score	Team 2
Club Africain (Tunisia)	3–1	(Libya) Al-Hilal Benghazi
Raja CA (Morocco)	1–0	(Egypt) Ismaily SC
Ismaily SC (Egypt)	4–0	(Libya) Al-Hilal Benghazi
Raja CA (Morocco)	2–0	(Tunisia) Club Africain
Ismaily SC (Egypt)	2–2	(Tunisia) Club Africain
Raja CA (Morocco)	0–0	(Libya) Al-Hilal Benghazi

14 August 2015
18:30

Club Africain (Tunisia)	3 – 1	(Libya) Al-Hilal Benghazi
Zidane 34' (o.g.); Ouedherfi 65'; Jaziri 83'		Saleh 6'

Stade Mohamed V, Casablanca
Referee: Mohamed Hanafi (Egypt)
14 August 2015
21:00

Raja CA (Morocco)	1 – 0	(Egypt) Ismaily SC
Bouldini 39'

Stade Mohamed V, Casablanca
Attendance: 35,000
Referee: Amir Loussif (Tunisia)

16 August 2015
18:30

Ismaily SC (Egypt)	4 – 0	(Libya) Al-Hilal Benghazi
Ikechukwu 46', 66'; Hamdi 64'; El Said 85'

Stade Mohamed V, Casablanca
Referee: Hicham Tiazi (Morocco)
16 August 2015
21:00

Raja CA (Morocco)	2–0	(Tunisia) Club Africain
Bouldini 32'; Iajour 88'

Stade Mohamed V, Casablanca
Referee: Ibrahim Noureddin (Egypt)

19 August 2015
18:30

Ismaily SC (Egypt)	2 – 2	(Tunisia) Club Africain
Hamad 9'; Ben Yahia 66' (o.g.)		Khalifa 48'; Jaziri 84'

Stade Mohamed V, Casablanca
Referee: Abdallah Baesus Ashraf (Libya)
19 August 2015
21:00

Raja CA (Morocco)	0 – 0	(Libya) Al-Hilal Benghazi

Stade Mohamed V, Casablanca
Referee: Sadok Selmi (Tunisia)

== Champions ==
2015 UNAF Club Cup winners
(Morocco)
Raja Casablanca
First title

== Statistics ==
=== Goalscorers ===
Rank	Player	Team	Goals
1	(Nigeria) Kenneth Ikechukwu	(Egypt) Ismaily SC	2
1	(Morocco) Mohamed Bouldini	(Morocco) Raja CA	2
1	(Tunisia) Seifeddine Jaziri	(Tunisia) Club Africain	2
2	(Egypt) Shawky El Said	(Egypt) Ismaily SC	1
2	(Egypt) Mahmoud Hamad	(Egypt) Ismaily SC	1
2	(Egypt) Emad Hamdi	(Egypt) Ismaily SC	1
2	(Libya) Mostafa Saleh	(Libya) Al-Hilal Benghazi	1
2	(Morocco) Hamza Iajour	(Morocco) Raja CA	1
2	(Tunisia) Saber Khalifa	(Tunisia) Club Africain	1
2	(Tunisia) Mehdi Ouedherfi	(Tunisia) Club Africain	1

1 own goal

- (Libya) Abdelhadi Zidane (playing against Club Africain)
- (Tunisia) Wissem Ben Yahia (playing against Ismaily SC)

== Media ==
=== Broadcasting ===
Territory	Channel	Ref
Morocco	Arryadia	
