= Amine Boukhlouf =

Algerian footballer (born 1984)

Personal information
- Full name: Amine Boukhlouf
- Date of birth: 30 January 1984 (age 42)
- Place of birth: Batna, Algeria
- Position: Forward

Team information
- Current team: USM Annaba
- Number: 9

Senior career*
Years	Team	Apps	(Gls)
2005–2006	MSP Batna	-	(-)
2006–2007	NA Hussein Dey	-	(-)
2007–2008	OMR El Annasser	-	(-)
2008	MSP Batna	-	(-)
2008–2010	CA Batna	-	(-)
2010–	USM Annaba	17	(2)

International career^{‡}
2005	Algeria U23	6	(0)
- * Club domestic league appearances and goals as of 00:00, 26 May 2011 (UTC) ‡ National team caps and goals as of 00:00, 26 May 2011 (UTC)

Amine Boukhlouf (Arabic: أمين بوخلوف; born 30 January 1984) is an Algerian footballer. He currently plays for USM Annaba in the Algerian Ligue Professionnelle 1.

== Club career ==
In 2010, Boukhlouf was a member of the CA Batna team that reached the final of the 2009–10 Algerian Cup. In the final, Boukhlouf started the match as they were defeated 3–0 by ES Sétif.

== International career ==
In January 2005, Boukhlouf was called up to the Algerian Under-23 National Team for a friendly tournament in Doha, Qatar. In April, he was also of the team at the 2005 Islamic Solidarity Games in Saudi Arabia. In total, he made 6 appearances for the Under-23 team.

== Honours ==
- Finalist of the Algerian Cup once with CA Batna in 2009–10 Algerian Cup
