= Saber Chebana =

Algerian footballer (born 1983)

Personal information
- Full name: Saber Chebana
- Date of birth: March 17, 1983 (age 43)
- Place of birth: Aïn M'lila, Algeria
- Position: Defender

Team information
- Current team: CA Batna
- Number: 3

Senior career*
| Years | Team | Apps | (Gls) |
| 2004–2005 | AS Ain M'lila | - | (-) |
| 2005– | CA Batna | - | (-) |
- * Club domestic league appearances and goals

Saber Chebana (born March 17, 1983) is an Algerian footballer. He currently plays for CA Batna in the Algerian Ligue Professionnelle 1.

== Club career ==
In 2010, Chebana helped CA Batna reach the final of the 2009–10 Algerian Cup for the first time in the club's history. In the final against ES Sétif, Chebana started the game but scored an own goal in the 68th minute as CA Batna lost 3–0.
