= UNAF Club Cup =

- Founded: 2015
- Region: North Africa (UNAF)
- Teams: 5
- Current champions: (Morocco) Raja Casablanca (1st title)
- Most championships: (Morocco) Raja Casablanca (1 title)
- Website: official site
- 2015 UNAF Club Cup

The UNAF Club Cup (Arabic: كأس إتحاد شمال إفريقيا للأندية) is a tournament designed by the Union of North African Football Federations (UNAF) that puts together the top three best finishers of the domestic leagues and the two finalists of the domestic cups around North Africa. The tournament has representatives from Algeria, Egypt, Libya, Morocco and Tunisia.

== History ==
The idea of creating this competition was proposed by the UNAF in 2011 by merging both the North African Cup of Champions and the North African Cup Winners Cup in a single competition. The tournament planned to start in September 2011, however it was postponed because financial problem of the principal sponsor of the competition, Nessma TV. In 2015 the competition took part for the first time.

== Format ==
The competition played in a round-robin tournament determined the final standings.

== Finals ==
Year	Winner	Score	Runner-up	Venue	Attendance
2015; Details	(Morocco) Raja Casablanca	^{n/a}	(Egypt) Ismaily SC	Stade Mohamed V, Casablanca	

^n/a A round-robin tournament determined the final standings.

== Records and statistics ==
=== Winning clubs ===
Num	Club	Winners	Runners-up	Years won	Years runners-up
1	(Morocco) Raja Casablanca	1	0	2015	
2	(Egypt) Ismaily SC	0	1		2015

=== Winners by country ===
Num	Nation	Winners	Runners-up
1	Morocco	1	0
2	Egypt	0	1

== See also ==
- North African Cup of Champions (defunct)
- North African Cup Winners Cup (defunct)
- North African Super Cup (defunct)
