= 2010 North African Cup Winners Cup =

Tournament details
- Dates: 2 November 2010 – 21 December 2010
- Teams: 4 (from UNAF confederations)

Final positions
- Champions: (Algeria) ES Sétif (1st title)
- Runners-up: (Libya) Al Nasr Benghazi

Tournament statistics
- Matches played: 6
- Goals scored: 18 (3 per match)
- Top scorer: (Algeria) Moustapha Djallit (4)
- Best player: (Algeria) Hocine Metref

The 2010 North African Cup Winners Cup was the third edition of the competition initiated in 2008 by the UNAF. The competition pits the cup winners from Algeria, Libya, Morocco and Tunisia.

Algerian club ES Sétif won the competition after beating Libyan side Nasr 6-3 on aggregate in the final.

== Participating teams ==
- (Algeria) ES Sétif (2009–10 Algerian Cup winners)
- (Libya) Al-Nasr Benghazi (2009–10 Libyan Cup winners)
- (Morocco) FAR Rabat (2009 Coupe du Trône winners)
- (Tunisia) Olympique Béja (2010 Tunisian President Cup winners)

== Prize money ==
The following prize money will be handed out for the 2010 edition:

- Champions: $100,000
- Runner-up: $50,000
- Semi-finalists: $15,000

== Draw ==
The draw was made in Tunis, Tunisia on September 14, 2010.

=== Semi-finals ===
Team 1	Agg.	Team 2	1st leg	2nd leg
Olympique Béja (Tunisia)	1–3	(Algeria) ES Sétif	1-0	0-3
FAR Rabat (Morocco)	2–3	(Libya) Nasr	2-1	0-2

==== First legs ====
November 2, 2010
13:30 GMT

Olympique Béja (Tunisia)	1 – 0	(Algeria) ES Sétif
Khalil Jlassi 28'	Report (in Arabic)

Stade Olympique, Béja

November 2, 2010
19:00 GMT

FAR Rabat (Morocco)	2 – 1	(Libya) Nasr
Mourad Fellah 71'; Ahmed Khalil 82'		Anees Zaghab 78'

Stade Moulay Abdellah, Rabat

==== Second legs ====
November 14, 2010

Nasr (Libya)	2 – 0	(Morocco) FAR Rabat
Sa'ad al Zayyani 63'; Ahmed Abdulqader 75'

Martyrs of February Stadium, Benina
Attendance: 11,000 (capacity)

November 23, 2010

ES Sétif (Algeria)	3 – 0	(Tunisia) Olympique Béja
Moustapha Djallit 26'; Abderahmane Hachoud 66'; Hocine Metref 86'

Stade 8 Mai 1945, Sétif

=== Finals ===
Team 1	Agg.	Team 2	1st leg	2nd leg
Nasr (Libya)	3–6	(Algeria) ES Sétif	1-3	2-3

December 9, 2010

Nasr (Libya)	1 – 3	(Algeria) ES Sétif
Ahmed Abdelkader 56'		Moustapha Djallit 26'; Hocine Metref 64'; Abderahmane Hachoud 86'

Martyrs of February Stadium, Benina

December 21, 2010

ES Sétif (Algeria)	3 – 2	(Libya) Nasr
Hocine Metref 5'; Moustapha Djallit 36', 38'		Anees Zaghab 66'; Effosa Eguakon 76'

Stade 8 Mai 1945, Sétif

== Champions ==
2010 North African Cup Winners Cup Winners
(Algeria)
ES Sétif
First title

== See also ==
- 2010 North African Cup of Champions
- 2011 North African Super Cup
