= Maghreb Champions Cup =

- Founded: 1969
- Region: Maghreb (UMF)
- Teams: 4
- Current champions: (Tunisia) Club Africain
- Most championships: (Algeria) CR Belouizdad (Tunisia) Club Africain (3 times)

The Maghreb Champions Cup was a North African football competition organized by the Union Maghrebine de Football (UMF) and which regrouped the winners of the leagues from Algeria, Morocco, Tunisia and Libya (only in the first edition It was for the biggest teams in your country ). Mauritania at this time was not a part of the Maghreb, so their clubs did not participate.

== Winners ==
Year	Host city	Final			Third Place Match		
Year	Host city	Champion	Score	Second Place	Third Place	Score	Fourth Place
1970; Details	(Algeria) Algiers	(Algeria) CR Belcourt	2 – 2 ( – ) penalties	(Tunisia) CS Sfaxien	(Libya) Al-Ittihad Club	0 – 0 ( – ) penalties	(Morocco) Wydad AC Casablanca
1971; Details	home/away	(Algeria) CR Belcourt	^{n/a}	(Tunisia) ES Tunis	(Morocco) FAR Rabat		
1972; Details	(Morocco) Casablanca	(Algeria) CR Belcourt	2 – 1	(Tunisia) CS Sfaxien	(Morocco) RS Settat	1 – 0	(Algeria) MC Oran
1973; Details	(Tunisia) Tunis	(Tunisia) ES Sahel	2 – 0	(Algeria) CR Belcourt	(Morocco) ADM Casablanca	1 – 1 ( – ) penalties	(Algeria) MO Constantine
1974; Details	(Algeria) Algiers	(Tunisia) Club Africain	2 – 0	(Algeria) JS Kabylie	(Tunisia) ES Sahel	1 – 0	(Morocco) KAC Kénitra
1975; Details	(Morocco) Casablanca	(Tunisia) Club Africain	2 – 0	(Morocco) Raja Beni Mellal	(Tunisia) ES Tunis	1 – 0	(Algeria) JS Kabylie
1976; Details	(Tunisia) Tunis	(Tunisia) Club Africain	1 – 1 (4 – 2) penalties	(Algeria) MC Alger	(Tunisia) ES Tunis	4 – 2	(Morocco) MC Oujda

^n/a A round-robin tournament determined the final standings.

== Winners by team ==
Rank	Club	Winners	Runners-up	Third
1	(Algeria) CR Belouizdad	3	1	0
2	(Tunisia) Club Africain	3	0	0
3	(Tunisia) ES Sahel	1	0	1
4	(Tunisia) CS Sfaxien	0	2	0
5	(Tunisia) ES Tunis	0	1	2
6	(Algeria) JS Kabylie	0	1	0
6	(Algeria) MC Alger	0	1	0
6	(Morocco) Raja Beni Mellal	0	1	0
9	(Libya) Al-Ittihad Club	0	0	1
9	(Morocco) FAR Rabat	0	0	1
9	(Morocco) Racing AC Casablanca	0	0	1
9	(Morocco) RS Settat	0	0	1

- CR Belouizdad (ex. CR Belcourt)
- Racing AC Casablanca (ex. ADM Casablanca)

== Winners by country ==
Rank	Club	Winners	Runners-up	Third
1	Tunisia	4	3	3
2	Algeria	3	3	0
3	Morocco	0	1	3
3	Libya	0	0	1

== See also ==
- Maghreb Cup Winners Cup
