= 2009 North African Cup of Champions =

Tournament details
- Dates: October 2009 – 19 December 2009
- Teams: 4 (from UNAF confederations)

Final positions
- Champions: (Algeria) ES Sétif (1st title)
- Runners-up: (Tunisia) ES Tunis

Tournament statistics
- Matches played: 6
- Goals scored: 15 (2.5 per match)
- Top scorer(s): (Algeria) Abdelmalek Ziaya (3 goals)
- Best player(s): (Algeria) Hocine Metref

The 2009 North African Cup of Champions was the second edition of the competition initiated by the North African Football Union (UNAF). Algerian side ES Sétif were crowned champions after beating Tunisian champions ES Tunis in a penalty shootout in the final. Midfielder Hocine Metref was chosen as the Best Player of the competition, while goalkeeper Faouzi Chaouchi was chosen as the Best Goalkeeper.

== Participating teams ==
- (Algeria) ES Sétif (2008-09 Algerian Championnat National Champions)
- (Tunisia) ES Tunis (2008-09 Tunisian Ligue Professionnelle Champions)
- (Libya) Ittihad Tripoli (2008-09 Libyan Premier League Champions)
- (Morocco) Raja Casablanca (2008-09 Botola Champions)

== Draw ==
The draw was made in Djerba, Tunisia on 25 July 2009 at an UNAF meeting.

=== Semi finals ===
==== First Legs ====
27 October 2009
19:15 EET

Raja Casablanca (Morocco)	1 – 1	(Algeria) ES Sétif
Dia Cire 81'; Nabil Masloub (yellow card) 44' (yellow-red card) 84'; Omar Najdi (yellow card) 90+4'	Report (in Arabic)	Nabil Hemani (yellow card) 34'; Abdelmalek Ziaya 69'

Stade Mohamed V, Casablanca
Referee: (Libya) Adil Arra'ee
29 October 2009
18:15 EET

ES Tunis (Tunisia)	2 – 1	(Libya) Ittihad
Khalil Chemmam 19'; Khaled Ayari 90+8'	Report (in Arabic)	Ahmed Zuway 35'

Stade El Menzah, Tunis
Referee: (Morocco) Abdallah Achiri

==== Second Legs ====
24 November 2009
17:00 GMT

ES Sétif (Algeria)	2 – 0	(Morocco) Raja Casablanca
Abdelmalek Ziaya 32', 49'		Ismail Belmaalam (yellow card) 36'

Stade 8 Mai 1945, Sétif
Referee: (Tunisia) Aouaz Trabelsi

ES Sétif go through with an aggregate score of 3–1

9 November 2009
18:00 GMT

Ittihad Tripoli (Libya)	2 – 2	(Tunisia) ES Tunis
Waleed Mhadeb 9'; Ahmed Zuway 54'	(Report) (in Arabic)	Henri Bienvenu 62'; Wajdi Bouazzi 90+4'

11 June Stadium, Tripoli
Referee: (Algeria) Mokhtar Amalou

ES Tunis go through with an aggregate score of 4–3.

=== Final ===
==== First leg ====
11 December 2009

ES Sétif (Algeria)	1 – 1	(Tunisia) ES Tunis
Bouazza Feham 65'	Report	Syam Ben Youssef 83'

Stade 8 Mai 1945, Sétif
Referee: (Libya) Wahid Tamuni

==== Second leg ====
20 December 2009

ES Tunis (Tunisia)	1 – 1 (a.e.t.) (5 – 6 pen.)	(Algeria) ES Sétif
Michael Eneramo 70' (pen.)		Lazhar Hadj Aïssa 35'

Stade 7 Novembre, Rades
Referee: (Morocco) Khalil Rouissi

== Champions ==
2009 North African Cup of Champions Winners
(Algeria)
ES Sétif
First title
