= 2009–10 Algerian Cup =

- Stade du 5 Juillet hosted the final

Tournament details
- Country: Algeria

Final positions
- Champions: ES Sétif (7th title)
- Runners-up: CA Batna

Tournament statistics
- Matches played: 63
- Goals scored: 186 (2.95 per match)

The 2009–10 Algerian Cup was the 46th edition of the Algerian Cup. ES Sétif won the Cup by defeating CA Batna 3–0 in the final with a brace from Hocine Metref and an own goal from Saber Chebana. It was the seventh time that Sétif won the trophy.

== Round of 32 ==
19 February 2010	SC Ain Merane	0–1	MC Alger	Stade Mohamed Boumezrag, Chlef
14:30		Report	Hamza Koudri 90'	Referee: Oukal, Laribi, Oudam

19 February 2010	USM Blida	2–2 (a.e.t.) (3–2 p)	JSM Bejaia	Stade Mustapha Tchaker, Blida
14:30	Abed 61'; Ezechiel N'Douassel 67'	Report	63', 71' Hamza Boulemdaïs	Referee: Bichari, Benarous, Boudiba

20 February 2010	JS Djijel	1–2 (a.e.t.)	CR Belouizdad	Stade Rouibah Hocine, Jijel
14:30	Bourada 65'	Report	12', 107' Sofiane Younès	Referee: A. Aouina, F. Aouina, Chnaoua

19 February 2010	E Sour El Ghozlane	1–0	MO Béjaïa	Stade Bouira OPOW, Bouira
14:30	Laoubi 39'	Report		Referee: Menguellati, Doulache, Ould Amar

19 February 2010	USM Bel-Abbès	2–1	JSM Chéraga	Stade 24 Fevrier 1956, Sidi-Bel-Abbès
14:30	Talbi 21'; Melika 69'	Report	55' Krifali	Referee: Ghorbal, Megherbi, Serradj

19 February 2010	CS Hamma Loulou	1–2	CA Batna	Stade Badji-Mokhtar Souk Ahras, Souk Ahras
14:30	Benturki 74'	Report	47' Ahmed Messadia; 82' Bensaci	Referee: Bouchama, Bourahla, Hadjadj

19 February 2010	WA Mostaganem	1–0	IB Mouzaia	Stade Mohamed-Bensaïd, Mostaganem
14:30	Benahmed 61'	Report		Referee: Saïsi, Benabdoun, Abid

20 February 2010	USM Annaba	1–0	MC El Eulma	Stade 19 Mai 1956, Annaba
14:30	Djamel Benchergui 36'	Report		Referee: Douala, Farouanji, Ourachdi

19 February 2010	CA Bordj Bou Arreridj	4–2	ES Mostaganem	Stade 20 Août 1955, Bordj Bou Arreridj
14:30	Bentayeb 17'; Touati 19'; Saïhi 57' (o.g.); Essomba 63'	Report	34' Boudjenah; 38' Berrah	Referee: Bahloul, Boucenna et Zid

19 February 2010	JS Kabylie	4–0	ASA Prot. Civile	Stade 1er Novembre 1954, Tizi Ouzou
14:30	Chemseddine Nessakh 34'; Izu Azuka 56', 63', 84'	Report		Referee: Sekhraoui, Bounoua, Bourouba

19 February 2010	JSH El Djabel	1–1 (a.e.t.) (4–5 p)	USM Khenchela	Stade Omar Benhaddad, Kouba
14:30	Hassini 6'	Report	80' Rebouh	Referee: Saâdi, Talbi, Oukhaled

19 February 2010	NA Hussein Dey	2–3	ASO Chlef	Stade 20 Août 1955, Algiers
14:30	Karim Braham Chaouch 44', 81'	Report	10' Bentayeb; 67' El Arbi Hillel Soudani; 90' Mohamed Messaoud	Referee: Abed Charef, Boulfelfel, Belakhal

19 February 2010	US Chaouia	1–3	USM Alger	Stade Hassouna Zerdani, Oum El Bouaghi
14:30	Boughali 72'	Report	19' (pen.) Karim Ghazi; 45' Nebié; 65' Noureddine Daham	Referee: Achouri, Tamen, Aribi

19 February 2010	WA Tlemcen	3–1	WR Bentalha	Stade Akid Lotfi, Tlemcen
14:30	44' (pen.) Mokhtar Benmoussa; 75' Moustapha Djallit; 90' Nabil Yaâlaoui	Report	72' Chabi	Referee: Sahraoui, Hellal, Mouaouche

19 February 2010	ES Setif	1–0	MC Saida	Stade 8 Mai 1945, Setif
18:00	Mourad Delhoum 27'	Report		Referee: Heddada, Razi, Henkache

19 February 2010	ICS Tlemcen	2–1	Hamra Annaba	Stade des Trois frères Zerga, Tlemcen
14:30	Regai 13', 23'	Report	21' Mekhoukh	Referee: Lafrid, Bensalah, Nair

== Round of 16 ==
16 March 2010	WA Mostaganem	0–1	ICS Tlemcen	Stade Mohamed-Bensaïd, Mostaganem
18:00		Report	90' Roguâi	Referee: Ba Brahim, Belkheir, Bouanani

16 March 2010	WA Tlemcen	1–1 (2–4 p)	ES Setif	Stade Akid Lotfi, Tlemcen
14:00	Yalaoui 11'	Report	87' Lamouri Djediat	Referee: Bouali, Tahir, Yamani

16 March 2010	USM Alger	0–3	MC Alger	Stade 5 Juillet 1962, Algiers
14:00		Report	64' Brahim Boudebouda; 71' Mohamed Derrag; 90' (pen.) Mohamed Lamine Zemmamouche	Referee: Necib, Bahloul, Guedjali

16 March 2010	USM Annaba	3–1	CA Bordj Bou Arreridj	Stade 19 Mai 1956, Annaba
18:00	Adlène Bensaïd 11'; Hammami 31'; Aboubaker Rebih 63'	Report	74' (pen.) Amar Ammour	Referee: Haïmoudi, Itchiali, Bachirane

16 March 2010	ASO Chlef	1–0	E Sour El Ghozlane	Stade Mohamed Boumezrag, Chlef
18:00	Sabri Gharbi 72'	Report		Referee: Achouri, Temmam, Arbi

15 March 2010	CR Belouizdad	0–1	JS Kabylie	Stade 20 Août 1955, Algiers
14:00		Report	30' Mohamed Amine Aoudia	Referee: Amalou, Benarous and Azrine

16 March 2010	CA Batna	0–0 (4–3 p)	USM Blida	Stade 1er Novembre 1954, Batna
14:00		Report		Referee: Benouza, Chabane, Hedia

16 March 2010	USM Khenchela	1–3	USM Bel-Abbès	Stade Hammam Amar, Khenchela
14:00	Samer 45'	Report	14' Kabri; 58', 84' Ahmed Chaouch	Referee: http://www.dzfoot.com/fiches/fiche2.php?fiche_id=5044

== Quarter-finals ==
9 April 2010	CA Batna	1–0 (a.e.t.)	MC Alger	Stade 1er Novembre 1954, Batna
14:30	Boukhlouf 93'	Report		Attendance: 12.000; Referee: Bouhenni, Amari, Mezrioua and Bencib

9 April 2010	USM Annaba	0–1	JS Kabylie	Stade 19 Mai 1956, Annaba
14:30		Report	47' Mohamed Amine Aoudia	Attendance: +35.000; Referee: Benouza, Chaâbane, and S. Hedia

13 April 2010	ES Setif	1–0	USM Bel-Abbès	Stade 8 Mai 1945, Setif
19:00	Bencharif 10' (pen.)	Report		Referee: Houassnia, Boulekrinet and Badache

9 April 2010	ASO Chlef	1–0	ICS Tlemcen	Stade Mohamed Boumezrag, Chlef
14:30	Sabri Gharbi 18'	Report		Referee: Bouali, Tahir and Yamani

== Semi-finals ==
Kickoff times are in local time.

20 April 2010
17:00

CA Batna	0–0 (a.e.t.)	JS Kabylie
	Report
Penalties
Penalty missed Penalty scored	7–6	(penalty scored) Meftah; (penalty missed) Yahia-Chérif; (penalty scored) Tedjar; (penalty scored) Maroci; (penalty scored) Aoudia; (penalty scored) Hamiti; (penalty scored) Coulibaly; (penalty missed) El Ouazzani

Stade 1er Novembre, Batna
Attendance: 30.000
Referee: Boumaaza

21 April 2010
20:45

ES Sétif	3–1	ASO Chlef
Bouazza Feham 18'; Nabil Hemani 67'; Lamouri Djediat 84'	Report	Sabri Gharbi 81'

Stade 8 Mai 1945, Sétif
Referee: Amalou

== Final ==
Home team	Score	Away team
ES Sétif	3–0	CA Batna

Kickoff times are in local time.

1 May 2010
16:00

ES Sétif	3–0	CA Batna
Hocine Metref 36', 72'; Saber Chebana 68' (og.)	Report

Stade 5 Juillet 1962, Algiers
Attendance: 50,000
Referee: Djamel Haimoudi

== Champions ==
Algerian Cup
2009–10 Winners

ES Sétif
7th Title
