= North African Cup of Champions =

- Founded: 2008
- Abolished: 2010
- Region: North Africa (UNAF)
- Teams: 5 (now 4)
- Most championships: (Tunisia) Club Africain (2)
- Broadcaster: Nessma TV
- 2010 North African Cup of Champions

The North African Cup of Champions was a tournament designed by the Union of North African Football (UNAF) that puts together the winners of the domestic leagues around North Africa. The tournament contains representatives from Algeria, Libya, Morocco and Tunisia.

== History ==
On October 6, the representatives of the Federation of North African Football (FNAF) met in Tunis. They agreed that North Africa, once one of the strongest regions in African football, did not have a regional competition that represented the region. Therefore, the President of the FNAF, the Algerian Mohamed Raouraoua, along with the rest of the FNAF, decided that two new competitions would be started in order to bring together the best sides in North Africa. The Cup of Champions brings together the winners of the five domestic leagues in North Africa, whereas the Cup Winners' Cup matches the winners of the five domestic cup competitions around North Africa.

On 2011 The competition was cancelled because the Arab Spring revolutions. On 2015, the Union of North African Football decided to merge the competition with the North African Cup Winners Cup and created the UNAF Club Cup.

== Format ==
The semi-finals and the final are two-legged affairs.

== Prize money ==
Prize money:

- Champions: $150,000
- Runner-up: $75,000
- 3rd Place: $35,000
- 4th Place: $35,000

== Finals ==
Year	Home team	Score	Away team	Venue	Attendance
2008; Details	(Tunisia) Club Africain	0 – 0	(Morocco) FAR Rabat	Stade Olympique d'El Menzah, Tunis	45,000
2008; Details	(Morocco) FAR Rabat	0 – 0 (2 - 3 Pen)	(Tunisia) Club Africain	Stade Moulay Abdellah, Rabat	52,000
2008; Details	Club Africain won 3 – 2 on penalties (0 – 0 on aggregate)				
2009; Details	(Algeria) ES Sétif	1 – 1	(Tunisia) ES Tunis	Stade 8 Mai 1945, Sétif	30,000
2009; Details	(Tunisia) ES Tunis	1 – 1 (5 - 6 Pen)	(Algeria) ES Sétif	Stade 14 January, Rades	65,000
2009; Details	ES Sétif won 6 – 5 on penalties (2 – 2 on aggregate)				
2010; Details	(Tunisia) Club Africain	2 – 0	(Algeria) MC Alger	Stade 14 January, Rades	65,000
2010; Details	(Algeria) MC Alger	1 – 1	(Tunisia) Club Africain	Stade 5 Juillet, Algiers	76,000
2010; Details	Club Africain won 3 – 1 on aggregate				

== Winners by team ==
Club	Winners	Runners-up
(Tunisia) Club Africain	2	0
(Algeria) ES Sétif	1	0
(Algeria) MC Alger	0	1
(Morocco) FAR Rabat	0	1
(Tunisia) ES Tunis	0	1

== Winners by country ==
Nation	Winners	Runners-up
Tunisia	2	1
Algeria	1	1
Morocco	0	1

== All-time tables ==
- 2 points for win

=== Clubs ===
Club	A	Pld	W	D	L	GF	GA	Pts	GD	%
(Tunisia) Club Africain	2	8	3	5	0	9	3	11	6	68.25%
(Algeria) ES Sétif	1	4	1	3	0	5	3	5	2	62.50%
(Tunisia) ES Tunis	1	4	1	3	0	6	5	5	1	62.50%
(Morocco) FAR Rabat	1	4	1	3	0	2	1	5	1	62.50%
(Algeria) MC Alger	1	4	1	2	1	2	3	4	-1	50.00%
(Libya) Al-Ittihad Tripoli	3	7	0	4	3	6	9	3	−2	28.57%
(Algeria) JS Kabylie	1	3	0	2	1	2	3	2	−1	33.33%
(Morocco) Raja Casablanca	1	2	0	1	1	1	3	1	−2	25.00%
(Morocco) Wydad Casablanca	1	2	0	1	1	0	3	1	−3	25.00%
	12	38	7	24	7	33	33	38	0	100.00%

=== Countries ===
Country	NT	A	Pld	W	D	L	GF	GA	Pts	GD	%
Tunisia	2	3	12	4	8	0	15	8	16	7	66.67%
Algeria	3	3	11	2	7	2	9	9	11	0	50.00%
Morocco	3	3	8	1	5	2	3	7	7	−4	43.75%
Libya	1	3	7	0	4	3	6	9	4	−3	30.00%
	9	12	38	7	24	7	33	33	38	0	100.00%

== See also ==
- UNAF Club Cup (2015)
- North African Super Cup (2010)
- North African Cup Winners Cup (2008 - 2010)
- Maghreb Champions Cup (1969 - 1975)
- North African Cup (1930 - 1956)
- North African Champions Cup (1920 - 1956)
