= North African Super Cup =

- Founded: 2010
- Abolished: 2011
- Region: North Africa (UNAF)
- Teams: 2
- Last champions: (Algeria) ES Sétif
- Most championships: (Algeria) ES Sétif (1)

The North African Super Cup was an annual association football competition which was launched in 2010. It is organised by the Union of North African Football Federations. The Super Cup pits the winner of the North African Cup of Champions against the winner of the North African Cup Winners Cup.

The competition was cancelled on 2011 because of the Arab Spring revolutions. On 2015, UNAF decided to merge the North African Cup of Champions and the North African Cup Winners Cup to create the UNAF Club Cup, so the competition was abolished automatically.

== Winners ==
Year	Winner	Score	Runner-up	Venue	Attendance
2010; Details	(Algeria) ES Sétif	1 – 0	(Tunisia) CS Sfaxien	Stade 8 Mai 1945, Sétif	25,000
2011; Details	Canceled ^{1}			Stade Olympique, Radès	

1. Match between Club Africain and ES Sétif canceled.

== Winners by team ==
Club	Winners	Runners-up
(Algeria) ES Sétif	1	0
(Tunisia) CS Sfaxien	0	1

== Winners by country ==
Nation	Winners	Runners-up
Algeria	1	0
Tunisia	0	1

== See also ==
- UNAF Club Cup
- North African Cup of Champions
- North African Cup Winners Cup
