= North African Cup Winners Cup =

Football competition

- Founded: 2008
- Abolished: 2010
- Region: North Africa (UNAF)
- Teams: 5
- Last champions: (Algeria) ES Sétif (1st title)
- Most championships: (Algeria) ES Sétif (Tunisia) ES Tunis (Tunisia) CS Sfaxien (1 title each)
- 2010 North African Cup Winners Cup

The North African Cup Winners Cup was a competition organised by the Union of North African Football, that contains the winners of the domestic cups around North Africa. The competition contains representatives from Algeria, Tunisia, Morocco, Libya and Egypt.

== History ==
The competition was founded along with the North African Cup of Champions in order to create a sense of competitiveness in the region. Tunisian club Esperance Sportive de Tunis claimed the inaugural title, defeating Algerian club JSM Béjaïa 2-1 over two legs.

On 2011 The competition was cancelled because the Arab Spring revolutions. On 2015, the Union of North African Football decided to merge the competition with the North African Cup of Champions and created the UNAF Club Cup.

== Prize money ==
- Champions: $100,000
- Runner-up: $50,000
- 3rd Place: $15,000
- 4th Place: $15,000

== Finals ==
Year	Home team	Score	Away team	Venue	Attendance
2008	(Algeria) JSM Béjaïa	0–0	(Tunisia) ES Tunis	Stade de l'Unité Maghrébine, Béjaïa	
2008	(Tunisia) ES Tunis	2–1	(Algeria) JSM Béjaïa	Stade Olympique d'El Menzah, Tunis	
2008	ES Tunis won 2–1 on aggregate				
2009	(Libya) Al-Ahly Benghazi SC	1–1	(Tunisia) CS Sfaxien	Martyrs of February Stadium, Benghazi	
2009	(Tunisia) CS Sfaxien	0–0	(Libya) Al-Ahly Benghazi SC	Stade Taieb Mhiri, Sfax	
2009	CS Sfaxien won by away goal after 1–1 on aggregate				
2010	(Libya) Al-Nasr Club	1–3	(Algeria) ES Sétif	Martyrs of February Stadium, Benghazi	
2010	(Algeria) ES Sétif	3–2	(Libya) Al-Nasr Club	Stade 8 Mai 1945, Sétif	30,000
2010	ES Sétif won 6–3 on aggregate				

== Winners by team ==
Club	Winners	Runners-up
(Algeria) ES Sétif	1	0
(Tunisia) CS Sfaxien	1	0
(Tunisia) Espérance ST	1	0
(Algeria) JSM Béjaïa	0	1
(Libya) Ahly Benghazi	0	1
(Libya) Al-Nasr Benghazi	0	1

== Winners by country ==
Nation	Winners	Runners-up
Tunisia	2	0
Algeria	1	1
Libya	0	2

== All-time tables ==
- 2 points for win

=== Clubs ===
Club	A	Pld	W	D	L	GF	GA	Pts	GD
(Algeria) ES Sétif	1	4	3	0	1	9	4	6	5
(Tunisia) CS Sfaxien	1	4	2	2	0	6	2	6	4
(Tunisia) ES Tunis	1	4	2	2	0	7	5	6	2
(Morocco) Maghreb Fez	1	4	2	1	1	8	5	5	3
(Morocco) FAR Rabat	2	4	1	1	2	2	4	3	−2
(Libya) Alahly Benghazi	1	4	1	3	0	1	0	5	1
(Algeria) JSM Béjaïa	1	4	1	1	2	3	3	3	0
(Libya) Al-Nasr Benghazi	1	4	1	0	3	6	8	2	−2
(Egypt) El-Masry	1	2	1	0	1	1	2	2	−1
(Tunisia) Olympique Béja	1	2	1	0	1	1	3	2	−2
(Algeria) CR Belouizdad	1	2	0	0	2	2	6	0	−4
(Libya) Khaleej Sirte	1	2	0	0	2	0	4	0	−4
	13	38	15	10	15	46	46	40	0

=== Countries ===
Country	NT	A	Pld	W	D	L	GF	GA	Pts	GD
Tunisia	3	3	10	5	4	1	14	10	14	4
Algeria	3	3	10	4	1	5	14	13	9	1
Morocco	2	3	8	3	2	3	10	9	8	1
Libya	3	3	10	2	3	5	7	12	7	−5
Egypt	1	1	2	1	0	1	1	2	2	−1
	13	14	32	15	10	15	46	46	38	0

== See also ==
- UNAF Club Cup
- North African Cup of Champions
- North African Super Cup
- North African Cup - a similar North African competition in French colonial era.
- Maghreb Cup Winners Cup - a similar North African competition in 1969 to 1975.
