= 2016–17 USM Alger season =

USM Alger
2016–17 season
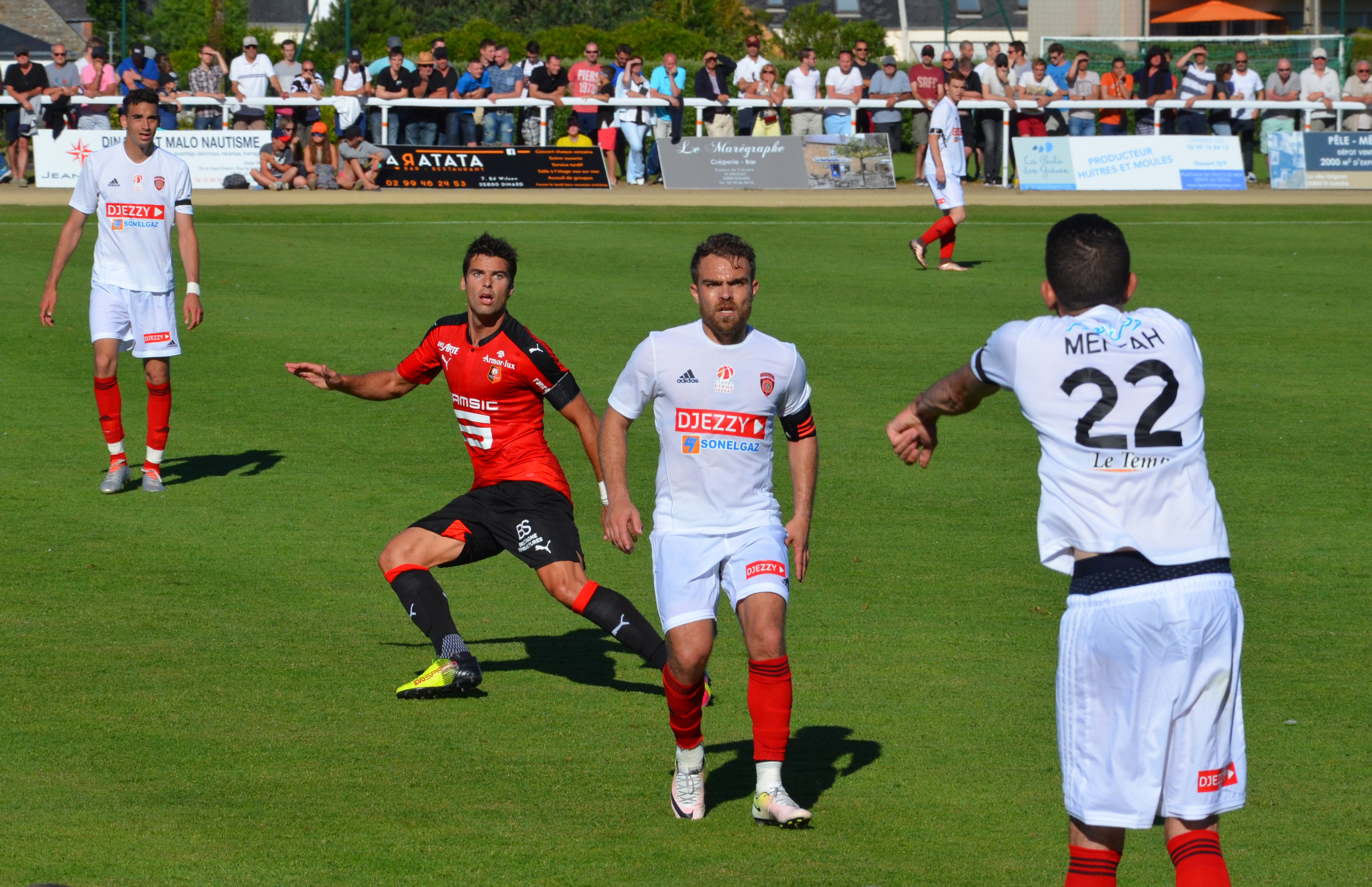
- Pre-season match in July 2016 between USM Alger and Stade Rennes
- Chairman: Ali Haddad
- Head coach: Miloud Hamdi (until 5 June 2016); Adel Amrouche (from 27 June 2016) (until 17 August 2016); Jean-Michel Cavalli (from 17 August 2016) (until 30 October 2016); Paul Put (from 30 October 2016)
- Stadium: Omar Hamadi Stadium; July 5, 1962 Stadium
- Ligue 1: 3rd
- Algerian Cup: Round of 16
- Champions League: Group stage
- Super Cup: Winners
- Top goalscorer: League: Mohamed Rabie Meftah (9 goals); All: Mohamed Rabie Meftah (11 goals)

In the 2016–17 season, USM Alger competed in the Ligue 1 for the 39th season, as well as the Algerian Cup. It was their 22nd consecutive season in the top flight of Algerian football. They competed in Ligue 1 as well as the CAF Champions League, and Algerian Super Cup, and the Algerian Cup.

USM Alger entered the 2016–2017 season as reigning Ligue Professionnelle 1 champions after winning the Ligue Professionnelle 1 title in the 2015–2016 season, The club was managed by Miloud Hamdi, until he left on 5 June 2016. He was replaced by Adel Amrouche on 27 June, but Amrouche resigned 3 days before the season began and was replaced by French manager Cavalli Cavalli was later sacked because of poor results and replaced by Belgian Paul Put.

== Season summary ==
Red and Black will play his first friendly match against Stade brestois 29 training playing in Ligue 2, they will face the Stade Rennes team the Algerian international Players Zeffane and Bensebaini. The last game will be against CFA training of US Granville, scheduled for July 22 in Granville.

of Algerian Champion for the seventh time last season, it's a USM Alger "new look" who will defend his title. If frameworks like Khoualed, Meftah, Koudri, Zemmamouche, Benmoussa and Chafaï are still at the club, the club management decided to overhaul the team, starting with the coaching staff. Indeed, the Belgian-Algerian Adel Amrouche, former coach of Kenya, Burundi and Equatorial Guinea, replaced Hamdi.

The club signed several players including Amir Sayoud (DRB Tadjenanet), Raouf Benguit (Paradou AC), Ziri Hammar (JS Saoura), Mohamed Benyahia (MC Oran), Toufik Zeghdane (MC Alger), Abel Khaled and Ghislain Guessan (RC Arbaâ). This significant level of recruitment alleviated the gaps left by the departures of Zinedine Ferhat, the prior season best assist, Brahim Boudebouda, Hocine El Orfi and Mohamed Seguer, The club has also recruited several players from the national under-20 squad. The squad had been coached by Mohamed Mekhazni and two of the players, Ilyes Yaiche and Ibrahim Farhi, had made the trip to France.

The first match was a friendly played against Stade brestois 29 and ended with a draw 1-1 goal scored by Union new player Bouderbal, three days later the team played the most important meeting against Stade Rennais from Ligue 1 and ended with the victory of the Algerian international guys Zeffane 1-0 Then, in the third meeting against the reserve team of the Stade Rennais achieved the first victory in the preparation matches by 4-0 Recording from Guessan two goals, Beldjilali goal by Penalty and finally the young Bengrina last goal, After the piece ran the team last friendly against US Granville ended with a draw 0-0 back to the team immediately after the end of the games to Algeria, Preparations were good where he discovered supporter several skilful players of the most prominent neo Bellahcene, Benyahia and Hammar in addition to the player the team youth Bengrina.

After the end of the first internship in France successfully USM Alger delegation returned to Algeria and Players he got four days rest before traveling to Tunisia, Sousse to fight a second internship between 27 July and 7 August punctuated by three friendly matches against clubs Tunisian.

== Squad list ==
Players and squad numbers last updated on 14 June 2017.
Note: Flags indicate national team as has been defined under FIFA eligibility rules. Players may hold more than one non-FIFA nationality.

No.	Name	Nat.	Position	Date of birth (age)	Signed from	Apps.	Goals	Signed in	Contract ends
Goalkeepers
1	Lamine Zemmamouche	(Algeria)	GK	19 March 1985 (aged 31)	(Algeria) MC Alger	296	0	2012	2020
16	Ismaïl Mansouri	(Algeria)	GK	7 January 1988 (aged 28)	(Algeria) MO Béjaïa	50	0	2008	2019
30	Mourad Berrefane	(Algeria)	GK	18 March 1986 (aged 30)	(Algeria) MO Béjaïa	20	0	2014	2016
Defenders
3	Ayoub Abdellaoui	(Algeria)	LB / CB	16 February 1993 (aged 23)	(Algeria) Youth system	58	1	2011	2016
5	Mohamed Benyahia	(Algeria)	CB / DM	30 June 1992 (aged 24)	(Algeria) MC Oran	31	3	2016	2019
6	Farouk Chafaï	(Algeria)	CB	23 June 1990 (aged 26)	(Algeria) Youth system	190	18	2010	2019
20	Nacereddine Khoualed (V.C.)	(Algeria)	CB	16 April 1986 (aged 30)	(Algeria) US Biskra	285	10	2006	2018
21	Toufik Zeghdane	(Algeria)	RB	17 September 1992 (aged 24)	(Algeria) MC Alger	1	0	2016	2019
25	Mokhtar Benmoussa	(Algeria)	LB / LM / LW	1 August 1986 (aged 30)	(Algeria) ES Sétif	172	11	2012	2019
30	Mohamed Rabie Meftah (C.)	(Algeria)	RB	5 May 1985 (aged 31)	(Algeria) JSM Béjaïa	175	36	2011	2020
31	Raouf Benguit	(Algeria)	RB / RM	5 April 1996 (aged 20)	(Algeria) Paradou AC	35	1	2016	2017
Midfielders
7	Rafik Bouderbal	(Algeria)	AM / FW	19 September 1987 (aged 29)	(France) AS Lyon-Duchère	14	0	2016	2018
8	Kaddour Beldjilali	(Algeria)	AM / CM	28 November 1988 (aged 28)	(Tunisia) Étoile du Sahel	60	5	2014	2017
10	Amir Sayoud	(Algeria)	AM	30 September 1990 (aged 26)	(Algeria) DRB Tadjenanet	25	3	2016	2020
15	Ziri Hammar	(Algeria)	AM	25 July 1992 (aged 24)	(Algeria) JS Saoura	10	0	2016	2020
14	Faouzi Bourenane	(Algeria)	AM	24 August 1994 (aged 22)	(Czech Republic) Příbram	12	1	2016	2020
17	Mohamed Benkablia	(Algeria)	AM	2 February 1993 (aged 23)	(Algeria) JS Kabylie	12	0	2016	2019
19	Abel Khaled	(Algeria)	AM	9 November 1992 (aged 24)	(Algeria) RC Arbaâ	2	0	2016	2018
23	Hamza Koudri	(Algeria)	DM	15 December 1987 (aged 29)	(Algeria) MC Alger	154	4	2012	2020
24	Mohammed Benkhemassa	(Algeria)	AM / DM	28 June 1993 (aged 23)	(Algeria) Youth system	69	2	2011	2018
26	Reda Bellahcene	(Algeria)	DM	21 January 1993 (aged 23)	(France) FC Saint-Louis Neuweg	11	1	2016	2019
41	Ilyes Yaiche	(Algeria)	AM / LM	27 October 1997 (aged 19)	(Algeria) Youth system	7	0	2016	2020
Forwards
9	Carolus Andriamatsinoro	(Madagascar)	CF	6 September 1989 (aged 27)	(Algeria) Paradou AC	131	20	2012	2017
11	Abderrahmane Meziane	(Algeria)	ST	7 March 1994 (aged 22)	(Algeria) RC Arbaâ	46	10	2014	2021
13	Oussama Darfalou	(Algeria)	ST / FW	29 September 1993 (aged 23)	(Algeria) RC Arbaâ	40	14	2015	2018
29	Ghislain Guessan	(Ivory Coast)	FW	15 September 1992 (aged 24)	(Algeria) RC Arbaâ	29	6	2016	2017

== Transfers ==
=== In ===
USM Alger started their transfer business early, acquiring midfielder Amir Sayoud for an undisclosed fee + Arslane Mazari and Djamel Chettal from DRB Tadjenanet on 9 June. USM Alger continued their recruitment in 11 June, signing young defender Raouf Benguit Loan from Paradou AC for a €50,000. 13 June, USM Alger confirmed their third summer signing in Reda Bellahcene, with the midfielder joining from FC Saint-Louis Neuweg for a free transfer. The club would later sign Ivorian prospect Ghislain Guessan, who joined the USM Alger team on a one-year deal from RC Arbaâ and also Abel Khaled from the same club. end of the season also saw the return of six players from the loan they Abderrahmane Meziane, Nazim Aklil, Abderrahmane Bourdim, Mohamed Taïb, Ibrahim Bekakchi and ivorian Manucho. in the month of July joined by four new players to the team they Rafik Bouderbal from AS Lyon-Duchère, Ziri Hammar from JS Saoura, Mohamed Benyahia from MC Oran and Toufik Zeghdane from MC Alger.

Date	Pos	Player	From club	Transfer fee	Source
9 June 2016	AM	(Algeria) Amir Sayoud	(Algeria) DRB Tadjenanet	Undisclosed + Arslane Mazari & Djamel Chettal	
11 June 2016	CB	(Algeria) Raouf Benguit	(Algeria) Paradou AC	Loan end of season + €50,000	
13 June 2016	CB / DM	(France) (Algeria) Reda Bellahcene	(France) FC Saint-Louis Neuweg	Free transfer	
28 June 2016	FW	(France) (Ivory Coast) Ghislain Guessan	(Algeria) RC Arbaâ	Undisclosed	
30 June 2016	ST	(Algeria) Abderrahmane Meziane	(Algeria) RC Arbaâ	Loan Return	
30 June 2016	FW	(Ivory Coast) Manucho	(Algeria) RC Relizane	Loan Return	
30 June 2016	DF	(Algeria) Nazim Aklil	(Algeria) JSM Skikda	Loan Return	
30 June 2016	MF	(Algeria) Abderrahmane Bourdim	(Algeria) RC Relizane	Loan Return	
30 June 2016	MF	(Algeria) Mohamed Taïb	(Algeria) RC Arbaâ	Loan Return	
30 June 2016	DF	(Algeria) Ibrahim Bekakchi	(Algeria) CA Bordj Bou Arréridj	Loan Return	
1 July 2016	AM	(France) (Algeria) Abel Khaled	(Algeria) RC Arbaâ	Undisclosed	
1 July 2016	AM / FW	(France) (Algeria) Rafik Bouderbal	(France) AS Lyon-Duchère	Undisclosed	
2 July 2016	AM	(France) (Algeria) Ziri Hammar	(Algeria) JS Saoura	Undisclosed	
2 July 2016	DM	(France) (Algeria) Mohamed Benyahia	(Algeria) MC Oran	€150,000	
4 July 2016	RB	(France) (Algeria) Toufik Zeghdane	(Algeria) MC Alger	Free transfer	
20 December 2016	AM	(Algeria) (France) Faouzi Bourenane	(Czech Republic) Příbram	Undisclosed	
25 December 2016	FW	(Algeria) Mohamed Benkablia	(Algeria) JS Kabylie	Free transfer (Released)	

=== Out ===
Date	Pos	Player	To club	Transfer fee	Source
8 June 2016	LB	(Algeria) Saadi Redouani	(Algeria) JS Kabylie	Free transfer (Released)	
8 June 2016	CB	(Algeria) Arslane Mazari	(Algeria) DRB Tadjenanet	As a part of Amir Sayoud Transfer	
15 June 2016	AM	(Algeria) Djamel Chettal	(Algeria) DRB Tadjenanet	As a part of Amir Sayoud Transfer	
18 June 2016	AM	(Algeria) Mohamed Taïb	(Algeria) CS Constantine	Free transfer (Released)	
19 June 2016	AM	(Algeria) Karim Baïteche	(Algeria) CS Constantine	Free transfer (Released)	
27 June 2016	RB / CB	(Algeria) Houcine Benayada	(Algeria) CS Constantine	Free transfer (Released)	
30 June 2016	FW	(Ivory Coast) Manucho	(Algeria) CS Constantine	Loan	
1 July 2016	MF	(Algeria) Nassim Bouchema	(Algeria) CR Belouizdad	End of contract	
1 July 2016	FW	(Algeria) Rachid Nadji	(Algeria) ES Sétif	End of contract	
1 July 2016	LB	(Algeria) Brahim Boudebouda	(Algeria) MC Alger	End of contract	
1 July 2016	FW	(Algeria) Mohamed Amine Aoudia	(Algeria) CS Constantine	End of contract	
1 July 2016	CM / LM / AM	(Algeria) Zinedine Ferhat	(France) Le Havre AC	End of contract	
1 July 2016	DM	(Algeria) Hocine El Orfi	(Algeria) NA Hussein Dey	End of contract	
1 July 2016	FW	(Algeria) Mohamed Seguer	(Algeria) MC Alger	End of contract	
1 July 2016	DF	(Algeria) Ibrahim Bekakchi	(Algeria) JS Saoura	Free transfer (Released)	
2 July 2016	AM / LM / RM	(Algeria) Abderrahmane Bourdim	(Algeria) JS Saoura	Free transfer	
4 July 2016	MF	(Algeria) Oualid Ardji	(Algeria) NA Hussein Dey	Loan	

=== New contracts ===
No.	Pos	Player	Contract length	Contract end	Date	Source
16	GK	(Algeria) Ismaïl Mansouri	2 years	2019	4 May 2016	
33	FW	(Algeria) Abderrahmane Meziane	2 years	2019	31 May 2016	
30	RB	(Algeria) Mohamed Meftah	3 years	2020	7 June 2016	
27	GK	(Algeria) Mourad Berrefane	2 years	2018	8 June 2016	
25	LB / LM / LW	(Algeria) Mokhtar Benmoussa	3 years	2019	16 June 2016	
6	CB	(Algeria) Farouk Chafaï	3 years	2019	19 June 2016	
N/A	AM / LM / RM	(Algeria) Abderrahmane Bourdim	5 years	2021	19 June 2016	
23	DM	(Algeria) Hamza Koudri	3 years	2020	8 November 2016	

== Pre-season and friendlies ==
13 July 2016 Friendly	Stade brestois 29 (France)	1–1	(Algeria) USM Alger	Ploudalmézeau
18:30 UTC+2	Magnon 46'	Report; Live TV: None	21' Bouderbal	Stadium: Municipal Ploudalmézeau; Attendance: 1.500

16 July 2016 Friendly	Stade Rennais (France)	1–0	(Algeria) USM Alger	Dinard
18:00 UTC+2	Gnagnon 66'	Report; Live TV: None		Stadium: Stade Paul Audrin; Attendance: 1.315; Referee: Bartolomeu Varela

20 July 2016 Friendly	Stade Rennais res (France)	0–4	(Algeria) USM Alger	Brittany
18:00 UTC+2		Report; Live TV: None	7', 50' Guessan; 81' (pen.) Beldjilali; 88' Bengruina	Stadium: Centre Henri Guerin; Attendance: 200; Referee: Benoît Millot

22 July 2016 Friendly	US Granville (France)	0–0	(Algeria) USM Alger	Granville
14:00 UTC+2		Report; Live TV: None		Stadium: Stade Louis Dior; Attendance: 50

30 July 2016 Friendly	Club Africain (Tunisia)	0–1	(Algeria) USM Alger	Mutuelleville
17:00 UTC+1		Report; Live TV: None	44' Andria	Stadium: Stade Chedli Zouiten; Attendance: 100

4 August 2016 Friendly	CS Sfaxien (Tunisia)	0–2	(Algeria) USM Alger	Sousse
17:00 UTC+1		Report; Live TV: None	25' Chafaï; 54' Sayoud

12 August 2016 Friendly	USM Alger	0–0	(Algeria) Paradou AC
16:00 UTC+1		Report; Live TV: None

== Competitions ==
=== Overview ===
Competition	Record								Started round	Final position / round	First match	Last match
Competition	G	W	D	L	GF	GA	GD	Win %	Started round	Final position / round	First match	Last match
Ligue 1	30	14	8	8	50	31	+19	46.67	—N/a	3rd	19 August 2016	14 June 2017
Algerian Cup	3	2	1	0	3	0	+3	66.67	Round of 64	Round of 16	24 November 2016	27 December 2016
Algerian Super Cup	1	1	0	0	2	0	+2	100.00	Final	Winners	1 November 2016	
Champions League	7	3	2	2	10	5	+5	42.86	First round	Group stage (Note: The competition will be completed in the new season 2017–18 starting from the fourth round.)	11 March 2017	30 June 2017
Total	41	20	11	10	65	36	+29	48.78				

=== Ligue 1 ===
==== League table ====
Pos	Team	Pld	W	D	L	GF	GA	GD	Pts	Qualification or relegation
1	ES Sétif (C)	30	17	6	7	42	23	+19	57	Qualification for the 2018 CAF Champions League
2	MC Alger	30	14	8	8	38	27	+11	50 (Note: MC Alger ahead of USM Alger on head-to-head record: MCA–UAL 2–1, UAL–MCA 2–2.)	Qualification for the 2018 CAF Champions League
3	USM Alger	30	14	8	8	50	31	+19	50	Qualification for the 2018 CAF Confederation Cup
4	USM Bel-Abbès	30	14	6	10	37	33	+4	48	
5	JS Saoura	30	12	9	9	34	30	+4	45	

Updated to match(es) played on 14 June 2017. Source: DZFoot
Rules for classification: 1) points; 2) head-to-head points; 3) head-to-head goal difference; 4) goal difference; 5) total goals; 6) fairplay ranking; 7) playoff.
(C) Champions

==== Results summary ====
Overall								Home						Away					
Pld	W	D	L	GF	GA	GD	Pts	W	D	L	GF	GA	GD	W	D	L	GF	GA	GD
30	14	8	8	50	31	+19	50	12	2	1	39	15	+24	2	6	7	11	16	−5

Last updated: 14 June 2017.
Source: Competitive matches

==== Results by round ====
Round	1	2	3	4	5	6	7	8	9	10	11	12	13	14	15	16	17	18	19	20	21	22	23	24	25	26	27	28	29	30
Ground	H	H	A	H	A	H	A	H	A	H	A	H	A	H	A	A	A	H	A	H	A	H	A	H	A	H	A	H	A	H
Result	W	W	D	W	W	W	L	W	L	L	D	W	L	W	L	D	L	D	L	W	W	D	D	W	D	W	D	W	L	W
Position	2	1	1	1	1	1	1	1	1	1	1	1	2	2	3	4	5	5	6	5	4	4	4	3	4	3	4	3	3	3

Updated to match(es) played on 14 June 2017. Source: Competitive matches
A = Away; H = Home; W = Win; D = Draw; L = Loss

==== Matches ====
Win Draw Loss

19 August 2016 Round 1	USM Alger	2–0	MO Béjaïa	Bologhine
19:15	Darfalou 44'; Meftah 78' (pen.)	Soccerway report Live TV: None	(yellow card) 60' Yesli; (yellow card) 77' Baouali	Stadium: Omar Hamadi Stadium; Referee: Mohamed Benouza

27 August 2016 Round 2	USM Alger	6–0	RC Relizane	Bologhine
19:00	Bentoucha 6' (o.g.); Meftah 24' (pen.); Guessan 41'; Benkhemassa 45'; Andria 71'; Benguit (yellow card) 79'; Darfalou 88'	Soccerway report Live TV: None	(yellow card) 23' Chahloul	Stadium: Omar Hamadi Stadium; Attendance: 0 (close doors); Referee: Said Aouina

9 September 2016 Round 3	DRB Tadjenanet	0–0	USM Alger	Tadjenanet
17:00		Soccerway report Live TV: EPTV Terrestre / TV Tamazight 4	(yellow card) 37' Khoualed; (yellow card) 56' Benkhemassa	Stadium: Lahoua Smaïl Stadium; Referee: Lahlou Benbraham

17 September 2016 Round 4	USM Alger	1–0	CS Constantine	Bologhine
19:00	Meziane 51'; Khoualed (yellow card) 57'; Benyahia (yellow card) 61'	Soccerway report Live TV: None	(yellow card) 77' Sameur	Stadium: Omar Hamadi Stadium; Referee: Mohamed Boukhalfa

24 September 2016 Round 5	CR Belouizdad	0–1	USM Alger	Algiers
17:45	Tarikat (yellow card) 81'; Feham (yellow card) 90+2'	Soccerway report Live TV: Algérie 3	12' Meziane; (yellow card) 62' Benguit; (yellow card) 90+4' Bouderbal	Stadium: Stade du 5 Juillet; Referee: Lotfi Bekouassa

1 October 2016 Round 6	USM Alger	3–2	Olympique de Médéa	Bologhine
17:00	Meziane 5'; Chafaï 9'; Meftah 41' (pen.) (yellow card) 66'; Benmoussa (yellow card) 49'; Benkhemassa (yellow card) 72'; Zemmamouche (yellow card) 89'; Guessan (yellow card) 93'	Soccerway report Live TV: Canal Algérie	(yellow card) 39' Saadou; 46' Banouh; 58' Gharbi; (yellow card) 66' Bouchiba; (yellow card) 70' Zeroual	Stadium: Omar Hamadi Stadium; Referee: Farouk Mial

13 October 2016 Round 7	MC Alger	2–1	USM Alger	Blida
19:00	Zerdab 38', 77' (pen.); Demmou (yellow card) 50'	Soccerway report Live TV: None	(yellow card) 17' Koudri; 87' Guessan	Stadium: Stade Mustapha Tchaker; Attendance: 0 (close doors); Referee: Mohamed Boukhalfa

22 October 2016 Round 8	USM Alger	2–1	JS Kabylie	Bologhine
17:00	Guessan 31'; Andria (yellow card) 57'; Meftah 81' (pen.)	Soccerway report Live TV: Algérie 3 / TV Tamazight 4	(yellow card) 52' Raiah; (yellow card) 76' Ziaya; 90+3' Rial	Stadium: Omar Hamadi Stadium; Referee: Redouane Necib

27 October 2016 Round 9	CA Batna	2–1	USM Alger	Batna
15:00	Meftah 20' (o.g.); Selmi (yellow card) 43'; Hadj Aïssa 62'	Soccerway report Live TV: None	(yellow card) 42' Benkhemassa; (yellow card) 71' Chafaï; 90' Benyahia	Stadium: Stade Mustapha Sefouhi; Referee: Mehdi Abid Charef

5 November 2016 Round 10	USM Alger	0–2	USM El Harrach	Algiers
16:00	Bellahcene (yellow card) 45'	Soccerway report Live TV: Algérie 3	38' Mellal; (yellow card) 62' Belarbi; 90+5' Younes	Stadium: Stade du 5 Juillet; Referee: Merzak Halalchi

11 November 2016 Round 11	MC Oran	0–0	USM Alger	Oran
16:00	Heriat (yellow card) 21'; Sebbah (yellow card) 90+2'	Soccerway report Live TV: TV Tamazight 4 / Algérie 3	(yellow card) 21' Guessan; (yellow card) 73' Abdellaoui; (yellow card) 90' Meftah	Stadium: Habib Bouakeul Stadium; Referee: Abderrezzak Arab

17 November 2016 Round 12	USM Alger	2–1	NA Hussein Dey	Algiers
17:00	Benyahia (yellow card) 44'; Guessan 54', 70' (yellow card) 54'; Benkhemassa (yellow card) 57'; Koudri (yellow card) 64'; Chafaï (yellow card) 87'	Soccerway report Live TV: TV Tamazight 4 / Canal Algérie / beIN Sports	58' Ardji; (yellow card) 80' El Orfi	Stadium: Stade du 5 Juillet; Referee: Lahlou Benbraham

1 December 2016 Round 13	USM Bel-Abbès	2–1	USM Alger	Sidi Bel Abbès
16:00	Balegh 7'; Kourbia 33'; Zenasni (yellow card) 53' (yellow-red card) 58'; Yaghni (yellow card) 70'	Soccerway report Live TV: TV Tamazight 4 / Canal Algérie	(yellow card) 36' Abdellaoui; (yellow card) 77' Guessan; 90' Andria; (yellow card) 90+2' Benkhemassa	Stadium: Stade 24 Fevrier 1956; Referee: Ahmed Bouzrar

9 December 2016 Round 14	USM Alger	3–1	ES Sétif	Bologhine
16:00	Chafaï 12'; Meftah 25'; Benyahia (yellow card) 58'; Meziane 78'	Soccerway report Live TV: EPTV Terrestre / TV Tamazight 4 / Algérie 3	57' (pen.) Amada	Stadium: Omar Hamadi Stadium; Referee: Mohamed Boukhalfa

22 December 2016 Round 15	JS Saoura	1–0	USM Alger	Béchar
19:00	Djallit 66'	Soccerway report Live TV: None	(yellow card) 3' (yellow-red card) 73' Meftah; (yellow card) 23' Meziane; (yellow card) 49' Sayoud; (yellow card) 55' Hammar; (yellow card) 74' Zemmamouche	Stadium: Stade 20 Août 1955; Referee: Said Aouina

3 February 2017 Round 18	USM Alger	0–0	DRB Tadjenanet	Bologhine
16:00	Benyahia (yellow card) 25'; Benmoussa (yellow card) 28'	Soccerway report Live TV: TV Tamazight 4	(yellow card) 41' Fourloul; (yellow card) 56' Hadded	Stadium: Omar Hamadi Stadium; Referee: Mohamed Boukhalfa

9 February 2017 Round 19	CS Constantine	1–0	USM Alger	Constantine
16:00	Sameur 51'; Benayada (yellow card) 61'; Zerara (yellow card) 63'; Aoudia (yellow card) 87'	Soccerway report Live TV: Canal Algérie	(yellow card) 53' Benguit	Stadium: Stade Mohamed Hamlaoui; Referee: Abderrezzak Arab

14 February 2017 Round 16	MO Béjaïa	0–0	USM Alger	Béjaïa
16:00	Khadir (yellow card) 10'; Boucherit (yellow card) 79' (yellow-red card) 81'; Sidibe (yellow card) 89'	Soccerway report Live TV: None	(yellow card) 10' Koudri; (yellow card) 15' Yaiche; (yellow card) 73' Benyahia	Stadium: Stade de l'Unité Maghrébine; Referee: Mehdi Abid Charef
Note: Match rescheduled due to share some of their players in the African Cup and World Cup military

20 February 2017 Round 20	USM Alger	2–1	CR Belouizdad	Algiers
18:00	Benguit 14'; Abdellaoui (yellow card) 48'; Meziane 72'; Zemmamouche (yellow card) 90+3'	Soccerway report	(yellow card) 86' Naamani; 90+1' Lamhene	Stadium: Stade du 5 Juillet; Referee: Lahlou Benbraham

25 February 2017 Round 21	Olympique de Médéa	1–3	USM Alger	Médéa
15:00	Lamraoui (yellow card) 27'; Banouh 44'; Rachedi (yellow card) 45+2'; Addadi (yellow card) 79'	Soccerway report Live TV: None	28' (pen.) Meftah; 64' Andria; (yellow card) 68' (yellow-red card) 78' Bellahcene; 72' Chafaï	Stadium: Stade Imam Lyes de Médéa; Referee: Farouk Mial

4 March 2017 Round 22	USM Alger	2–2	MC Alger	Algiers
17:45	Benmoussa (yellow card) 8'; Meftah 21' (yellow card) 90+6'; Benyahia 25'; Chafaï (yellow card) 60'	Soccerway report Live TV: Algérie 3 / Al-Kass Sports	4' Seguer; (yellow card) 8' Karaoui; 10' Bouguèche; (yellow card) 90+6' Boudebouda	Stadium: Stade du 5 Juillet; Referee: Rafik Achouri

25 March 2017 Round 17	RC Relizane	2–0	USM Alger	Relizane
16:00; Match rescheduled due to share some of their players in the African Cup and World Cup military	Guebli 24' (yellow card) 70'; Benayad 33' (yellow card) 35'; Bousseder (yellow card) 33'	Soccerway report Live TV: Canal Algérie		Stadium: Stade Tahar Zoughari; Referee: Merzoug Brahimi

25 April 2017 Round 23	JS Kabylie	1–1	USM Alger	Tizi Ouzou
18:00	Djerrar (yellow card) 11'; Zerguine 35' (yellow card) 35'	Soccerway report Live TV: Al-Kass Sports / TV Tamazight 4	(yellow card) 15' Benguit; 43' Benyahia; (yellow card) 64' Abdellaoui; (yellow card) 85' Mansouri	Stadium: November 1, 1954 Stadium; Referee: Mehdi Abid Charef

29 April 2017 Round 24	USM Alger	3–0	CA Batna	Bologhine
17:00	Koudri (yellow card) 35'; Bitam 60' (o.g.); Darfalou 72', 87'	Soccerway report Live TV: Al-Kass Sports / TV Tamazight 4		Stadium: Omar Hamadi Stadium; Referee: Mohamed Saïdi

7 May 2017 Round 25	USM El Harrach	1–1	USM Alger	Algiers
17:45	Younes (yellow card) 3' (goal) 20'; Zeghba (yellow card) 90+2'	Soccerway report Live TV: Canal Algérie / Al-Kass Sports	57' Meftah; (yellow card) 71' Chafaï; (yellow card) 87' Beldjilali	Stadium: Stade du 5 Juillet; Referee: Abderrezzak Arab

16 May 2017 Round 26	USM Alger	2–1	MC Oran	Bologhine
17:45	Andria 48'; Benguit (yellow card) 81'; Meziane 88'	Soccerway report Live TV: Algérie 3 / TV Tamazight 4	(yellow card) 86' Sebbah; 90+3' Hamidi	Stadium: Omar Hamadi Stadium; Referee: Farouk Mial

29 May 2017 Round 27	NA Hussein Dey	1–1	USM Alger	Algiers
22:30	Coumbassa 5'; Laribi (yellow card) 47'; Ouertani (yellow card) 64'; Herida (yellow card) 88'	Soccerway report Live TV: TV Tamazight 4 / Al-Kass Sports	7' Meziane; (yellow card) 35' Abdellaoui	Stadium: Stade du 5 Juillet; Referee: Ahmed Bouzerar

7 June 2017 Round 28	USM Alger	6–2	USM Bel-Abbès	Bologhine
22:30	Darfalou 9'; Chafaï (yellow card) 20'; Meftah 29'; Sayoud (yellow card) 44'; Meziane 45+1'; Bourenane 58'; Koudri 65'; Beldjilali 77'	Soccerway report Live TV: TV Tamazight 4 / Al-Kass Sports	22' Zouari; (yellow card) 50' Khali; (yellow card) 50' Balegh; (yellow card) 51' (goal) 90+2' (pen.) Bounoua; (yellow card) 62' Bouguelmouna	Stadium: Omar Hamadi Stadium; Referee: Rafik Achouri

10 June 2017 Round 29	ES Sétif	2–1	USM Alger	Sétif
22:30	Djahnit 5'; Djabou 52'; Khedairia (yellow card) 84'	Soccerway report Live TV: TV Tamazight 4 / beIN Sports / Al-Kass Sports	(yellow card) 19' Benyahia; (yellow card) 33' Meziane; (yellow card) 55' Beldjilali; 75' Sayoud	Stadium: Stade 8 Mai 1945; Referee: Mohamed Saïdi

14 June 2017 Round 30	USM Alger	5–2	JS Saoura	Bologhine
22:30	Darfalou 23', 77', 83'; Andria (yellow card) 44'; Benmoussa 60' (pen.); Benguit (yellow card) 63'; Khoualed 90+3' (pen.)	Soccerway report Live TV: None	43' Bourdim; (yellow card) 68' Tiboutine; 86' Bekakchi	Stadium: Omar Hamadi Stadium; Attendance: 0 (close doors); Referee: Mehdi Abid Charef

=== Algerian Super Cup ===
1 November 2016	USM Alger	2–0	MC Alger	Blida (Note: The final of the Algerian Super Cup in 2016 between USM Alger and MC Alger will be relocated to the Mustapha Tchaker Stadium in Blida instead of July 5, 1962 Stadium.)
17:45	Benkhemassa (yellow card) 38'; Abdellaoui (yellow card) 43'; Chafaï 61'; Meftah 77' (pen.)	Report; Live TV: Algérie 3 / beIN Sports / Al-Kass Sports	(yellow card) 40' Mebarakou; (yellow card) 44' (yellow-red card) 64' Boudebouda; (yellow card) 75' Chaâl; (yellow card) 80' Hachoud	Stadium: Mustapha Tchaker Stadium; Referee: Mohamed Benouza
Note: Match rescheduled due to share some of their players in the Football at the 2016 Summer Olympics

=== Algerian Cup ===
24 November 2016 Round of 64	USM Alger	2–0	NT Souf	Bologhine
17:00	Sayoud 43' (yellow card) 71'; Guessan 78'	Soccerway report DZfoot report Live TV: TV Tamazight 4	(yellow card) 52' Bitel	Stadium: Omar Hamadi Stadium; Referee: Azzaz, Benaceur, Djafi
Note: Lineup for USM Alger - Berrefane - Meftah (c), Benyahia, Abdellaoui, Benmoussa - Benguit, Benkhemassa, Koudri (Beldjillali 80’), Sayoud (Meziane 89’) - Bouderbal (Andria 46’), Guessan

16 December 2016 Round of 32	USM Alger	1–0	CA Batna	Bologhine
16:00	Guessan (yellow card) 81'; Meftah 83'; Hammar (yellow card) 87'	Soccerway report DZfoot report Live TV: EPTV Terrestre / Canal Algérie	(yellow card) 45+1' (yellow-red card) 70' Djarbou; (yellow card) 46' Khennab; (yellow card) 87' Daoud	Stadium: Omar Hamadi Stadium; Referee: Mustapha Ghorbal
Note: Lineup for USM Alger - Zemmamouche - Meftah (c), Benyahia, Chafaï, Benmoussa - Benguit, Benkhemassa, Hammar - Bouderbal, Guessan (Darfalou 81’), Meziane (Andria 88’)

27 December 2016 Round of 16	USM Bel-Abbès	0–0 (a.e.t.) (5–4 p)	USM Alger	Sidi Bel Abbes
17:00	Khali (yellow card) 26'; Balegh (yellow card) 100'; Toual (yellow card) 103'	Soccerway report DZfoot report Live TV: EPTV Terrestre	(yellow card) 100' Abdellaoui	Stadium: Stade 24 Fevrier 1956; Referee: Brahimi, Semsoum, Chaballah
	Penalties
	Sidhoum (penalty missed); Benabderahmane (penalty scored); Belhocini (penalty missed); Cherifi (penalty scored); Balegh (penalty scored); Kourbia (penalty scored); Bounoua (penalty scored)		(penalty scored) Benyahia; (penalty missed) Sayoud; (penalty missed) Benguit; (penalty scored) Benmoussa; (penalty scored) Meziane; (penalty scored) Abdellaoui; (penalty missed) Beldjilali
Note: Lineup for USM Alger - Zemmamouche (c) - Benguit, Benyahia, Chafaï, Abdellaoui - Koudri (Benmoussa 112’), Benkhemassa, Beldjilali - Andria (Sayoud 75’), Darfalou, Hammar (Meziane 66’)

=== Champions League ===
==== Qualifying rounds ====
===== First round =====
11 March 2017 first leg	USM Alger (Algeria)	2–0	(Burkina Faso) Rail Club du Kadiogo	Bologhine
20:30 UTC+1	Koudri (yellow card) 31'; Darfalou 72'; Sayoud 87'	Report	(yellow card) 30' S.Sylla; (yellow card) 32' Traoré; (yellow card) 34' Amanor; (yellow card) 81' O.Sylla; (yellow card) 85' Sidiki Traoré; (yellow card) 88' Asamoah; (yellow card) 90' Sawadogo	Stadium: Omar Hamadi Stadium; Referee: Youssef Essrayri (Tunisia)
Note: Lineup for USM Alger - Zemmamouche, Benguit, Chafaï, Abdellaoui (Bellahcène, 60'), Benmoussa, Koudri, Benyahia, Bourenane (Sayoud, 56'), Andria, Guessan (Darfalou, 67'), Meziane

18 March 2017 Second leg	Rail Club du Kadiogo (Burkina Faso)	1–0 (1–2 agg.)	(Algeria) USM Alger	Ouagadougou
15:30 UTC+0	Asamoah (yellow card) 44'; Kahan 54'; John (yellow card) 68'; Ibeh (yellow card) 83'	Report	(yellow card) 26' (yellow-red card) 27' Sayoud; (yellow card) 48' Abdellaoui	Stadium: Stade du 4 Août (Note: Rail Club du Kadiogo played their home match at Stade du 4 Août, Ouagadougou, instead of their regular stadium Stade de Kadiogo, Kadiogo.); Referee: Mahamadou Keita (Mali)
Note: Lineup for USM Alger - Zemmamouche, Benguit, Benyahia (Bourenane, 74'), Chafaï, Abdellaoui, Meziane (Zeghdane, 85'), Koudri, Benmoussa, Sayoud, Andria, Guessan (Belahcène, 63')

==== Group stage ====
Pos	Team	Pld	W	D	L	GF	GA	GD	Pts	Qualification	USM	AHT	ZAM	CAP
1	(Algeria) USM Alger	6	3	2	1	12	5	+7	11	Quarter-finals	—	3–0	2–0	4–1
2	(Libya) Al-Ahli Tripoli	6	2	3	1	11	10	+1	9	Quarter-finals	1–1	—	0–0	4–2
3	(Egypt) Zamalek	6	1	3	2	6	8	−2	6 (Note: Head-to-head results: Zamalek 2–0 CAPS United, CAPS United 3–1 Zamalek (Zamalek won on away goals).)		1–1	2–2	—	2–0
4	(Zimbabwe) CAPS United	6	2	0	4	10	16	−6	6		2–1	2–4	3–1	—

Source: CAF
Rules for classification: Group stage tiebreakers
Notes:

12 May 2017 Matchday 1	USM Alger (Algeria)	3–0	(Libya) Al-Ahli Tripoli	Algiers
18:00 UTC+1	Chafaï 31'; Carolus 45+1'; Darfalou 83'	Report		Stadium: Stade du 5 Juillet; Referee: Youssef Essrayri (Tunisia)

24 May 2017 Matchday 2	CAPS United (Zimbabwe)	2–1	(Algeria) USM Alger	Harare
15:00 UTC+2	Chitiyo 16', 81'	Report	Abdellaoui 67'	Stadium: National Sports Stadium; Referee: Thierry Nkurunziza (Burundi)

2 June 2017 Matchday 3	Zamalek (Egypt)	1–1	(Algeria) USM Alger	Alexandria
22:00 UTC+2	Mayuka 90+4'	Report	Chafaï 30'	Stadium: Borg El Arab Stadium; Referee: Ali Lemghaifry (Mauritania)

21 June 2017 Matchday 4	USM Alger (Algeria)	2–0	(Egypt) Zamalek	Algiers
23:00 UTC+1	Bellahcene 44'; Meziane 87'	Report		Stadium: Stade du 5 Juillet; Referee: Victor Gomes (South Africa)

30 June 2017 Matchday 5	Al-Ahli Tripoli (Libya)	1–1	(Algeria) USM Alger	Sfax (Tunisia)
19:00 UTC+1	Saltou 38'	Report	Chafaï 16'	Stadium: Stade Taïeb Mhiri (Note: Teams from Libya were not allowed to host their home matches in their country due to security concerns.); Referee: Bamlak Tessema Weyesa (Ethiopia)

9 July 2017 Matchday 6	USM Alger (Algeria)	4–1	(Zimbabwe) CAPS United	Algiers
20:00 UTC+1	Hammar 36'; Hamzaoui 42'; Darfalou 78', 88'	Report	81' Amidu	Stadium: Stade du 5 Juillet; Attendance: 52,000; Referee: Malang Diedhiou (Senegal)

== Squad information ==
=== Appearances and goals ===
No.	Pos	Player	Nat	Ligue 1			Algerian Cup			Champions League			Super Cup			Total		
No.	Pos	Player	Nat	App	St	G	App	St	G	App	St	G	App	St	G	App	St	G
Goalkeepers
1	GK	Lamine Zemmamouche	(Algeria)	26	26	0	2	2	0	7	7	0	1	1	0	36	36	0
16	GK	Ismaïl Mansouri	(Algeria)	2	2	0	0	0	0	0	0	0	0	0	0	2	2	0
30	GK	Mourad Berrefane	(Algeria)	2	2	0	1	1	0	0	0	0	0	0	0	3	3	0
Defenders
3	DF	Ayoub Abdellaoui	(Algeria)	20	19	0	2	2	0	6	6	1	1	1	0	29	28	1
5	DF	Mohamed Benyahia	(Algeria)	24	23	3	3	3	0	3	3	0	1	1	0	31	30	3
6	DF	Farouk Chafaï	(Algeria)	25	24	3	2	2	0	7	7	3	1	1	1	35	34	7
20	DF	Nacereddine Khoualed	(Algeria)	9	7	1	0	0	0	0	0	0	1	1	0	10	8	1
21	DF	Toufik Zeghdane	(Algeria)	0	0	0	0	0	0	1	0	0	0	0	0	1	0	0
25	DF	Mokhtar Benmoussa	(Algeria)	28	24	1	3	2	0	7	6	0	1	0	0	39	32	1
30	DF	Mohamed Rabie Meftah	(Algeria)	29	29	9	2	2	1	5	5	0	1	1	1	37	37	11
31	DF	Raouf Benguit	(Algeria)	26	24	1	3	3	0	6	6	0	0	0	0	35	33	1
Midfielders
7	MF	Rafik Bouderbal	(Algeria)	11	10	0	2	2	0	0	0	0	1	1	0	14	13	0
8	MF	Kaddour Beldjilali	(Algeria)	18	14	1	2	1	0	5	5	0	0	0	0	25	20	1
10	MF	Amir Sayoud	(Algeria)	19	8	1	2	1	1	4	3	1	0	0	0	25	12	3
14	MF	Faouzi Bourenane	(Algeria)	8	4	1	0	0	0	4	2	0	0	0	0	12	6	1
15	MF	Ziri Hammar	(Algeria)	6	3	0	2	2	0	2	0	0	0	0	0	10	5	0
17	MF	Mohamed Benkablia	(Algeria)	10	6	0	0	0	0	2	1	0	0	0	0	12	7	0
19	MF	Abel Khaled	(Algeria)	2	1	0	0	0	0	0	0	0	0	0	0	2	1	0
23	MF	Hamza Koudri	(Algeria)	22	19	1	2	2	0	5	5	0	1	1	0	30	27	1
24	MF	Mohammed Benkhemassa	(Algeria)	17	14	1	3	3	0	2	0	0	1	1	0	23	18	1
26	MF	Reda Bellahcene	(Algeria)	6	4	0	0	0	0	5	1	1	1	0	0	12	5	1
37	MF	Mustapha Bengrina (Note: Player from USM Alger Reserve)	(Algeria)	6	1	0	0	0	0	0	0	0	0	0	0	6	1	0
38	MF	Mohamed Reda Boumechra	(Algeria)	1	0	0	0	0	0	0	0	0	0	0	0	1	0	0
41	MF	Ilyes Yaiche	(Algeria)	7	2	0	0	0	0	0	0	0	0	0	0	7	2	0
Forwards
9	FW	Carolus Andriamatsinoro	(Madagascar)	21	16	4	3	1	0	7	7	1	1	0	0	32	24	5
	FW	Okacha Hamzaoui	(Algeria)	0	0	0	0	0	0	2	0	0	0	0	0	2	0	0
11	FW	Abderrahmane Meziane	(Algeria)	26	21	8	3	0	0	7	7	1	1	1	0	37	29	9
13	FW	Oussama Darfalou	(Algeria)	19	14	8	2	0	0	6	5	2	0	0	0	27	19	10
29	FW	Ghislain Guessan	(Ivory Coast)	23	13	5	2	2	1	3	2	0	1	1	0	29	18	6
Total				30		50	3		3	7		10	1		2	41		65

Last updated: 17 June 2022
Source: soccerway.com

=== Disciplinary record ===
No.	Pos.	Player	Ligue 1			Algerian Cup			Champions League			Super Cup			Total		
No.	Pos.	Player	Yellow card	(yellow card) (yellow-red card)	Red card	Yellow card	(yellow card) (yellow-red card)	Red card	Yellow card	(yellow card) (yellow-red card)	Red card	Yellow card	(yellow card) (yellow-red card)	Red card	Yellow card	(yellow card) (yellow-red card)	Red card
1	GK	(Algeria) Lamine Zemmamouche	3	0	0	0	0	0	0	0	0	0	0	0	3	0	0
16	GK	(Algeria) Ismaïl Mansouri	1	0	0	0	0	0	0	0	0	0	0	0	1	0	0
3	DF	(Algeria) Ayoub Abdellaoui	4	0	0	1	0	0	1	0	0	1	0	0	7	0	0
5	DF	(Algeria) Mohamed Benyahia	6	0	0	0	0	0	0	0	0	0	0	0	6	0	0
6	DF	(Algeria) Farouk Chafaï	5	0	0	0	0	0	0	0	0	0	0	0	5	0	0
20	DF	(Algeria) Nacereddine Khoualed	2	0	0	0	0	0	0	0	0	0	0	0	2	0	0
25	DF	(Algeria) Mokhtar Benmoussa	3	0	0	0	0	0	1	0	0	0	0	0	4	0	0
30	DF	(Algeria) Mohamed Rabie Meftah	3	1	0	0	0	0	0	0	0	0	0	0	3	1	0
31	DF	(Algeria) Raouf Benguit	6	0	0	0	0	0	0	0	0	0	0	0	6	0	0
7	MF	(Algeria) Rafik Bouderbal	1	0	0	0	0	0	0	0	0	0	0	0	1	0	0
8	MF	(Algeria) Kaddour Beldjilali	2	0	0	0	0	0	0	0	0	0	0	0	2	0	0
10	MF	(Algeria) Amir Sayoud	2	0	0	1	0	0	1	1	1	0	0	0	4	1	1
15	MF	(Algeria) Ziri Hammar	1	0	0	1	0	0	0	0	0	0	0	0	2	0	0
23	MF	(Algeria) Hamza Koudri	4	0	0	0	0	0	2	0	0	0	0	0	6	0	0
24	MF	(Algeria) Mohammed Benkhemassa	5	0	0	0	0	0	0	0	0	1	0	0	6	0	0
26	MF	(Algeria) Reda Bellahcene	2	0	1	0	0	0	0	0	0	0	0	0	2	0	1
41	MF	(Algeria) Ilyes Yaiche	1	0	0	0	0	0	0	0	0	0	0	0	1	0	0
9	FW	(Madagascar) Carolus Andriamatsinoro	2	0	0	0	0	0	0	0	0	0	0	0	2	0	0
11	FW	(Algeria) Abderrahmane Meziane	2	0	0	0	0	0	0	0	0	0	0	0	2	0	0
29	FW	(Ivory Coast) Ghislain Guessan	4	0	0	1	0	0	0	0	0	0	0	0	5	0	0
Total			59	1	1	4	0	0	5	1	1	2	0	0	70	2	2

==== Suspensions ====
Date Incurred	Nation	Name	Games Missed	Reason
1 November 2016	(Algeria)	Mohammed Benkhemassa	1	Yellow card
5 November 2016	(Algeria)	Ziri Hammar	3	(red card) (vs. USM El Harrach)
17 November 2016	(Algeria)	Farouk Chafaï	1	Yellow card
1 December 2016	(Algeria)	Ghislain Guessan	1	Yellow card
1 December 2016	(Algeria)	Ayoub Abdellaoui	1	Yellow card
22 December 2016	(Algeria)	Mohamed Meftah	1	(red card) (vs. JS Saoura)
3 February 2017	(Algeria)	Mokhtar Benmoussa	1	Yellow card
14 February 2017	(Algeria)	Mohamed Benyahia	1	Yellow card
25 February 2017	(Algeria)	Reda Bellahcene	1	(red card) (vs. Olympique de Médéa)
18 March 2017	(Algeria)	Amir Sayoud	1	(red card) (vs. Rail Club du Kadiogo)
25 April 2017	(Algeria)	Ismaïl Mansouri	1	(yellow card)
2 June 2017	(Algeria)	Hamza Koudri	1	Yellow card
2 June 2017	(Algeria)	Raouf Benguit	1	Unknown

=== Goalscorers ===
Includes all competitive matches. The list is sorted alphabetically by surname when total goals are equal.

No.	Nat.	Player	Pos.	L 1	AC	CL 1	SC	TOTAL
30	(Algeria)	Mohamed Meftah	DF	9	1	0	1	11
13	(Algeria)	Oussama Darfalou	FW	8	0	2	0	10
11	(Algeria)	Abderrahmane Meziane	FW	8	0	1	0	9
6	(Algeria)	Farouk Chafaï	DF	3	0	3	1	7
29	(Ivory Coast)	Ghislain Guessan	FW	5	1	0	0	6
9	(Madagascar)	Carolus Andriamatsinoro	FW	4	0	1	0	5
5	(Algeria)	Mohamed Benyahia	DF	3	0	0	0	3
10	(Algeria)	Amir Sayoud	MF	1	1	1	0	3
24	(Algeria)	Mohammed Benkhemassa	MF	1	0	0	0	1
31	(Algeria)	Raouf Benguit	MF	1	0	0	0	1
3	(Algeria)	Ayoub Abdellaoui	DF	0	0	1	0	1
8	(Algeria)	Kaddour Beldjilali	MF	1	0	0	0	1
14	(Algeria)	Faouzi Bourenane	MF	1	0	0	0	1
23	(Algeria)	Hamza Koudri	MF	1	0	0	0	1
25	(Algeria)	Mokhtar Benmoussa	DF	1	0	0	0	1
20	(Algeria)	Nacereddine Khoualed	DF	1	0	0	0	1
26	(Algeria)	Reda Bellahcene	MF	0	0	1	0	1
Own Goals				2	0	0	0	2
Totals				50	3	10	2	65

=== Clean sheets ===
Includes all competitive matches.

No.	Nat	Name	L 1	AC	ASC	CL 1	Total
1	(Algeria)	Lamine Zemmamouche	8	2	2	2	14
16	(Algeria)	Ismaïl Mansouri	–	–	–	–	–
30	(Algeria)	Mourad Berrefane	1	1	–	–	2
		TOTALS	9	3	2	2	16

=== Hat-tricks ===
Player	Against	Result	Date	Competition	Ref
(Algeria) Oussama Darfalou	JS Saoura	5–2 (H)	14 June 2017	Ligue Professionnelle 1	

(H) – Home; (A) – Away

== Kit ==
Supplier: Adidas after that Joma, the beginning of the year 2017. Sponsor: Djezzy

Home	Away	Third	Four	Goalkeeper 1	Goalkeeper 2

Home	Away	Third
