= List of Algerian Ligue Professionnelle 1 players =

This is a list of Algerian Ligue Professionnelle 1 players (soccer/football) who have made 200 or more appearances in the Algerian Ligue Professionnelle 1. Statistics are updated as of 14 June 2024.

== Key ==
- bold Players with this background are still playing in the Algerian Ligue Professionnelle 1.
- The name used for each club is the name they had when player most recently played a league match for them.
- Seasons = number of seasons a player had participated in Algerian Ligue Professionnelle 1; Years = a span between the first and most recent year a player had played a match in Algerian Ligue Professionnelle 1

== List of players ==
Name	Nationality	Pos.	Apps	Goals	Algerian Ligue 1 clubs	Seasons	Years	Ref.
Abderahmane Hachoud	Algeria	DF	309	62	ES Setif, MC Alger, ES Ben Aknoun	13	2010–24	
Chemseddine Nessakh	Algeria	DF	308	25	JS Kabylie, ASO Chlef, MC Oran, ES Sétif, CR Belouizdad	14	2010–24	
Mohamed Lagraâ	Algeria	DF	307	2	USM El Harrach, ES Sétif, JS Saoura, USM Bel Abbès, MC Oran	12	2010–23	
Amir Karaoui	Algeria	MF	294	26	MC El Eulma, ES Sétif, MC Alger, HB Chelghoum Laïd	13	2010–23	
Nacereddine Khoualed	Algeria	DF	285	10	USM Alger, JS Saoura, US Biskra	14	2010–24	
Sid Ali Lamri	Algeria	MF	283	16	ES Sétif, CS Constantine, HB Chelghoum Laïd, USM Khenchela	12	2010–24	
Akram Djahnit	Algeria	MF	283	38	ES Sétif, USM Alger	14	2010–24	
Abdelhak Sameur	Algeria	MF	282	39	WA Tlemcen, CS Constantine, CR Belouizdad, Olympique de Médéa, US Biskra	12	2010–24	
Abdenour Belkheir	Algeria	FW	258	15	USM Blida, JS Saoura, CS Constantine, MC Alger	11	2010–22	
Hamza Koudri	Algeria	MF	254	15	MC Alger, USM Alger	12	2010–22	
Zineddine Mekkaoui	Algeria	DF	251	8	USM Annaba, CS Constantine, JS Kabylie, RC Relizane, MC Oran	12	2010–22	
Mohamed Khoutir Ziti	Algeria	DF	250	4	JS Kabylie, CS Constantine, ES Sétif, CA Bordj Bou Arreridj, CR Belouizdad	13	2010–24	
Amir Bellaili	Algeria	DF	247	13	AS Khroub, CRB Aïn Fakroun, CR Belouizdad, JS Kabylie, AS Ain M'lila, CS Constantine	11	2010–24	
Zidane Mebarakou	Algeria	DF	247	4	JSM Béjaïa, MO Béjaïa, MC Alger, CS Constantine	12	2010–22	
Sabri Gharbi	Algeria	MF	241	16	ASO Chlef, MC Alger, CS Constantine, Olympique de Médéa, MC Oran, USM Bel Abbès, RC Relizane	12	2010–22	
Mohamed Rabie Meftah	Algeria	DF	240	54	JSM Béjaïa, USM Alger, NA Hussein Dey	11	2010–21	
Ahmed Gasmi	Algeria	FW	238	72	JSM Béjaïa, USM Alger, ES Sétif, NA Hussein Dey, CR Belouizdad	11	2010–21	
Mohamed Lamine Zemmamouche	Algeria	GK	238	0	MC Alger, USM Alger, ES Ben Aknoun	14	2010–24	
Mohamed El Amine Hammia	Algeria	MF	236	29	USM Blida, JS Saoura	11	2010–24	
Zakaria Draoui	Algeria	MF	234	14	CR Belouizdad, ES Setif	9	2014–23	
Cédric Si Mohamed	Algeria	GK	227	0	JSM Béjaïa, CS Constantine, US Biskra, CR Belouizdad, CA Bordj Bou Arreridj	11	2010–21	
Walid Derrardja	Algeria	FW	221	54	NA Hussein Dey, MC El Eulma, MC Alger, MC Oran	11	2010–21	
Mokhtar Benmoussa	Algeria	MF	220	21	ES Sétif, USM Alger, USM Bel Abbès	10	2010–20	
Hamza Heriat	Algeria	MF	218	2	USM Alger, CA Batna, MC Oran, USM Blida, US Biskra	11	2010–21	
Walid Bencherifa	Algeria	DF	215	13	JS Kabylie, CS Constantine	9	2012–21	
Moustapha Djallit	Algeria	FW	212	70	ES Sétif, JSM Béjaïa, MC Alger, JS Saoura	9	2010–19	
Zine El-Abidine Sebbah	Algeria	DF	212	6	MC Oran, CS Constantine, ASM Oran, NA Hussein Dey	11	2010–21	
Bouazza Feham	Algeria	MF	211	27	ES Sétif, USM Alger, CR Belouizdad, MO Béjaïa, RC Relizane	9	2010–21	
Mohamed Seguer	Algeria	FW	208	44	ASO Chlef, USM Alger, MC Alger, USM Bel-Abbès, RC Relizane, WA Tlemcen	11	2010–22	
Nabil Bousmaha	Algeria	MF	208	1	JS Saoura, NA Hussein Dey, CA Bordj Bou Arreridj	9	2012–21	
Toufik Zerara	Algeria	MF	207	20	JSM Béjaïa, ES Sétif, CS Constantine, CA Bordj Bou Arreridj, CR Belouizdad	9	2011–20	
Mohamed Tiaiba	Algeria	FW	205	68	MC El Eulma, CS Constantine, CA Bordj Bou Arreridj, ES Sétif, USM El Harrach, RC Relizane, MC Oran, AS Aïn M'lila	10	2010–21	
Chamseddine Harrag	Algeria	MF	201	7	USM El Harrach, NA Hussein Dey, MC Alger, JS Kabylie	11	2012–23	
Messaoud Gherbi	Algeria	MF	200	8	USM El Harrach, MC El Eulma, CS Constantine, CA Bordj Bou Arreridj	8	2010–19	

== Foreign players with most appearances ==
Name	Nationality	Pos.	Apps	Goals	Algerian Ligue 1 clubs	Seasons	Years	Ref.
Ibrahim Amada	Madagascar	MF	170	14	JS Kabylie, AS Khroub, USM El Harrach, ES Sétif, MC Alger	8	2011–19	
Gilles Ngomo	Cameroon	MF	152	9	AS Khroub, CS Constantine, CR Belouizdad	6	2010–16	
Carolus Andriamatsinoro	Madagascar	FW	128	26	WA Tlemcen, USM Alger	6	2011–17	
Soumaila Sidibe	Mali	MF	111	1	MO Béjaïa, USM Alger, CR Belouizdad	5	2014–19	
Eudes Dagoulou	Central African Republic	FW	101	18	MC Oran, ES Sétif	5	2011–16	

== Gallery ==
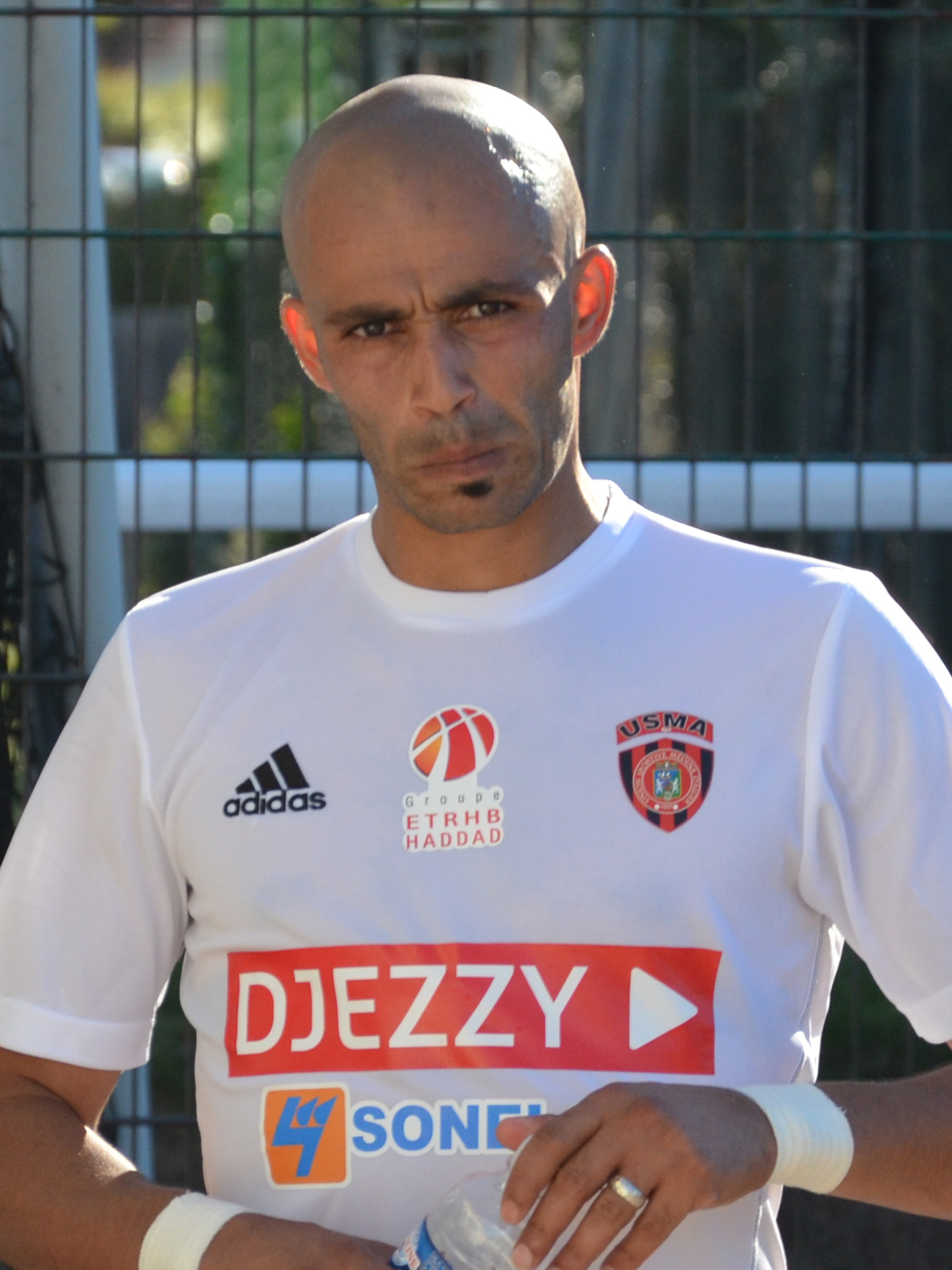
Mokhtar Benmoussa.

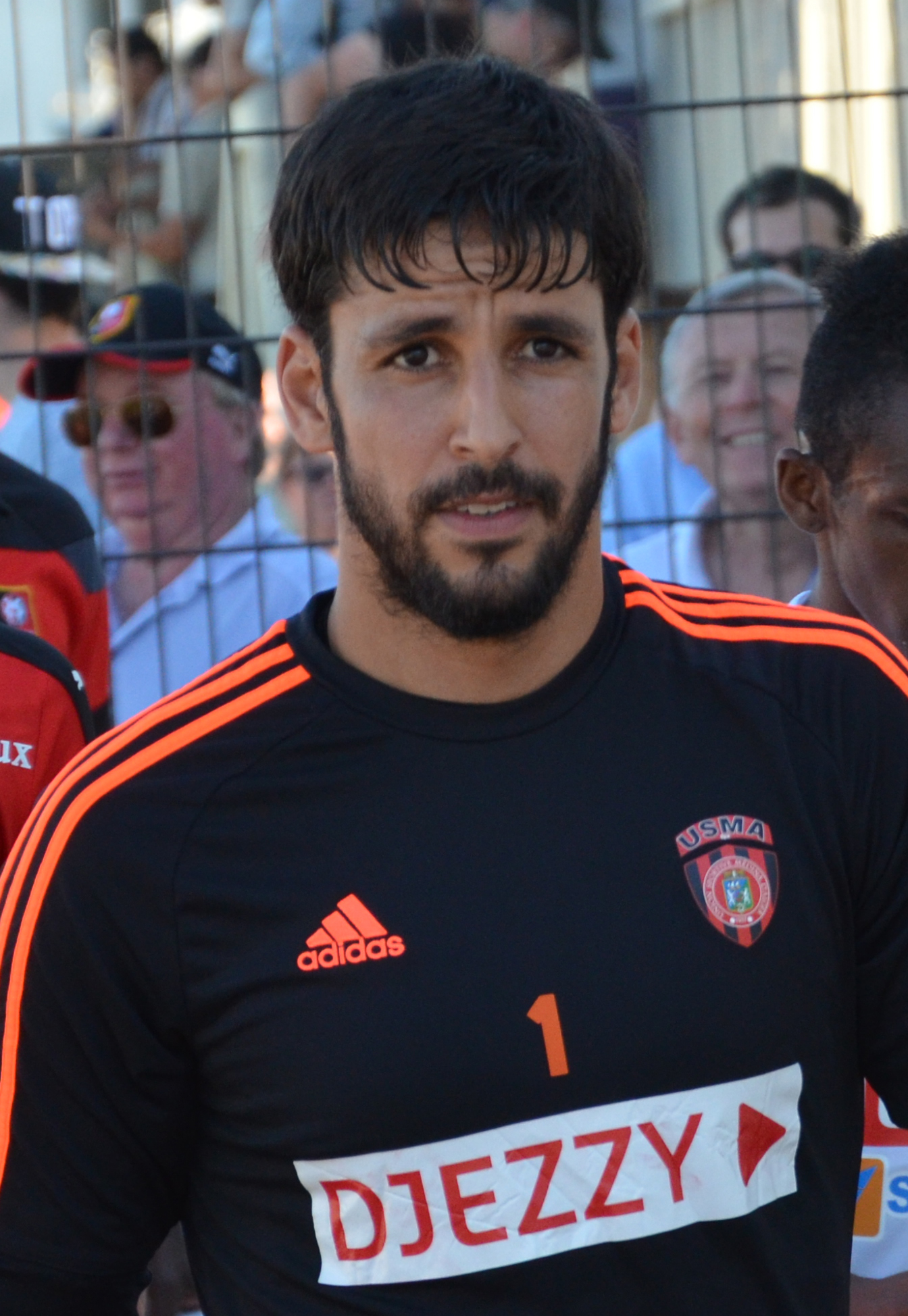
Mohamed Lamine Zemmamouche.

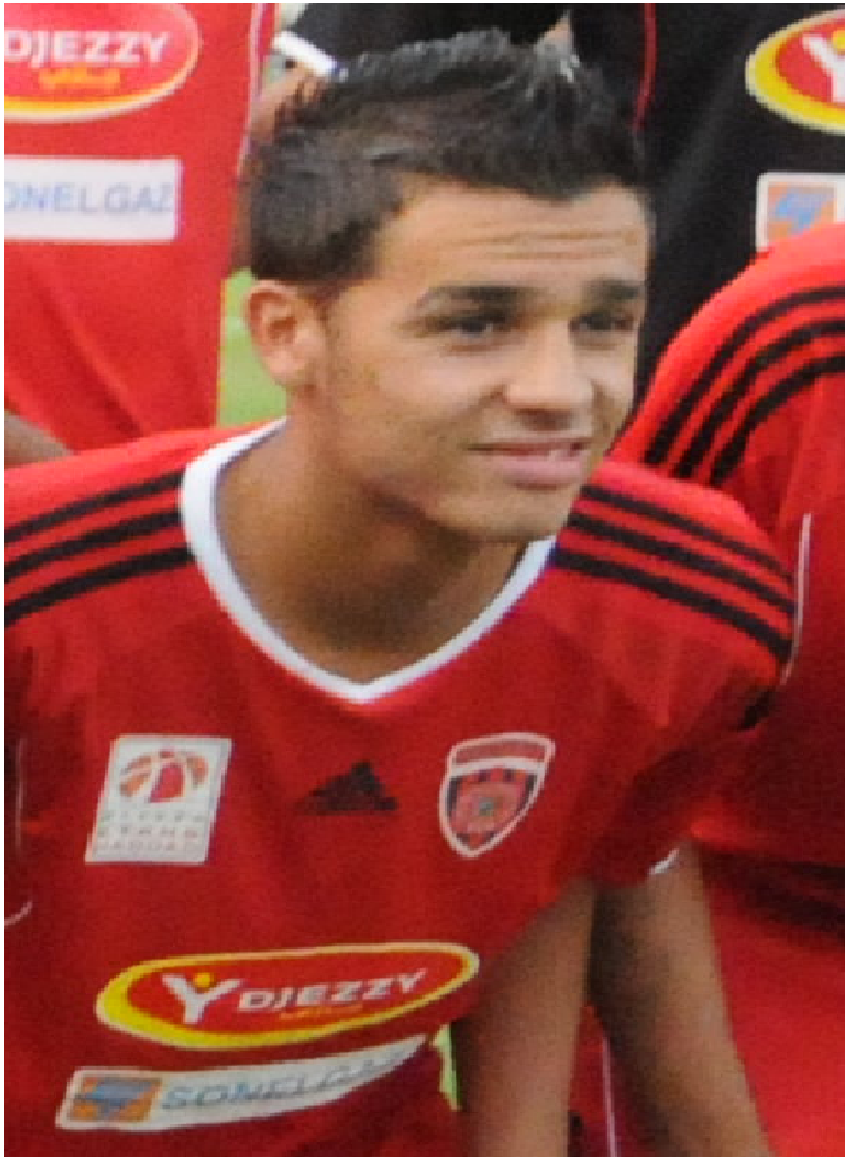
Farouk Chafaï.

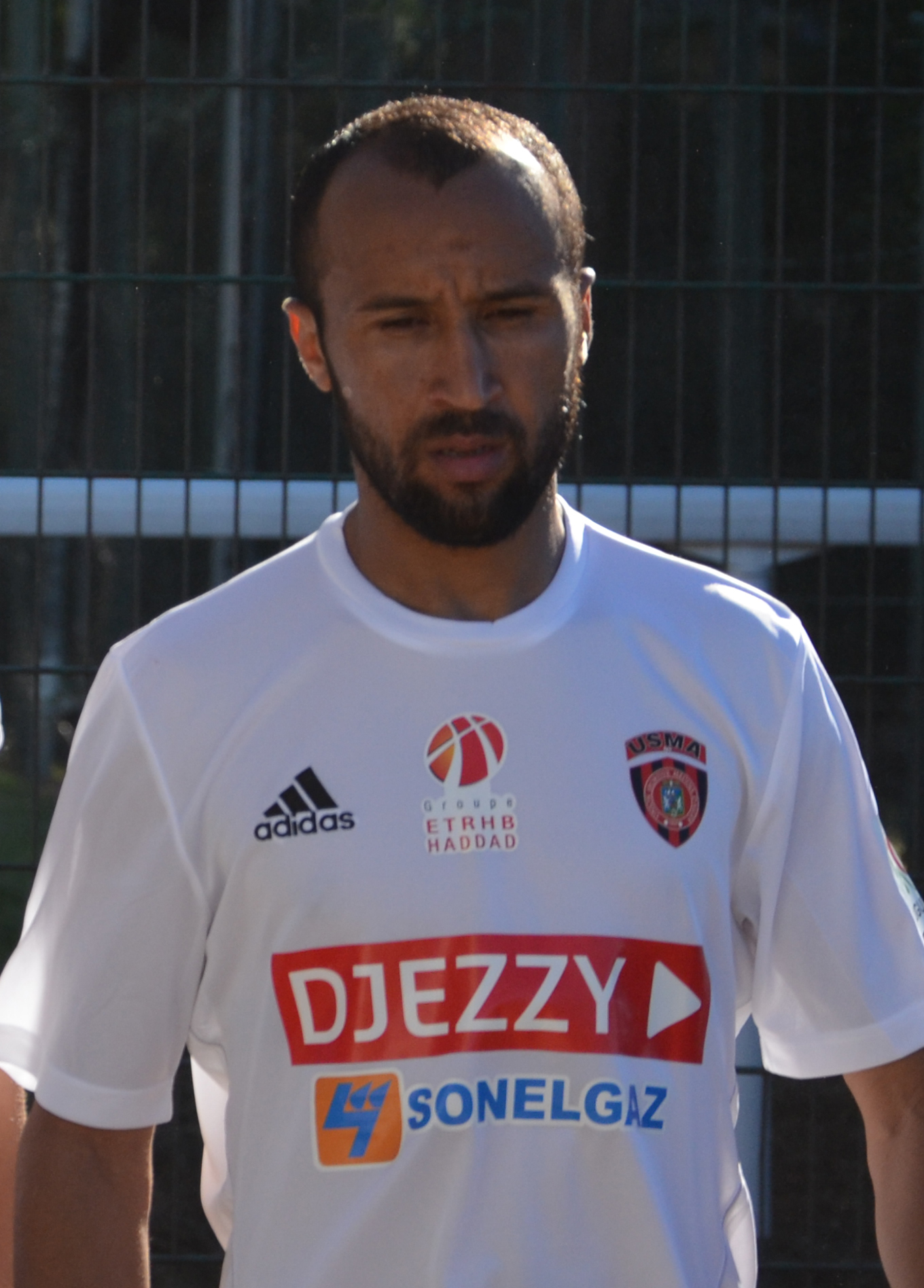
Nacereddine Khoualed.

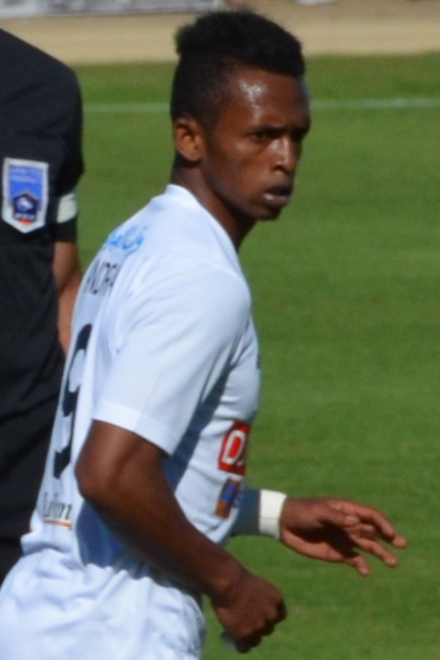
Carolus Andriamatsinoro.

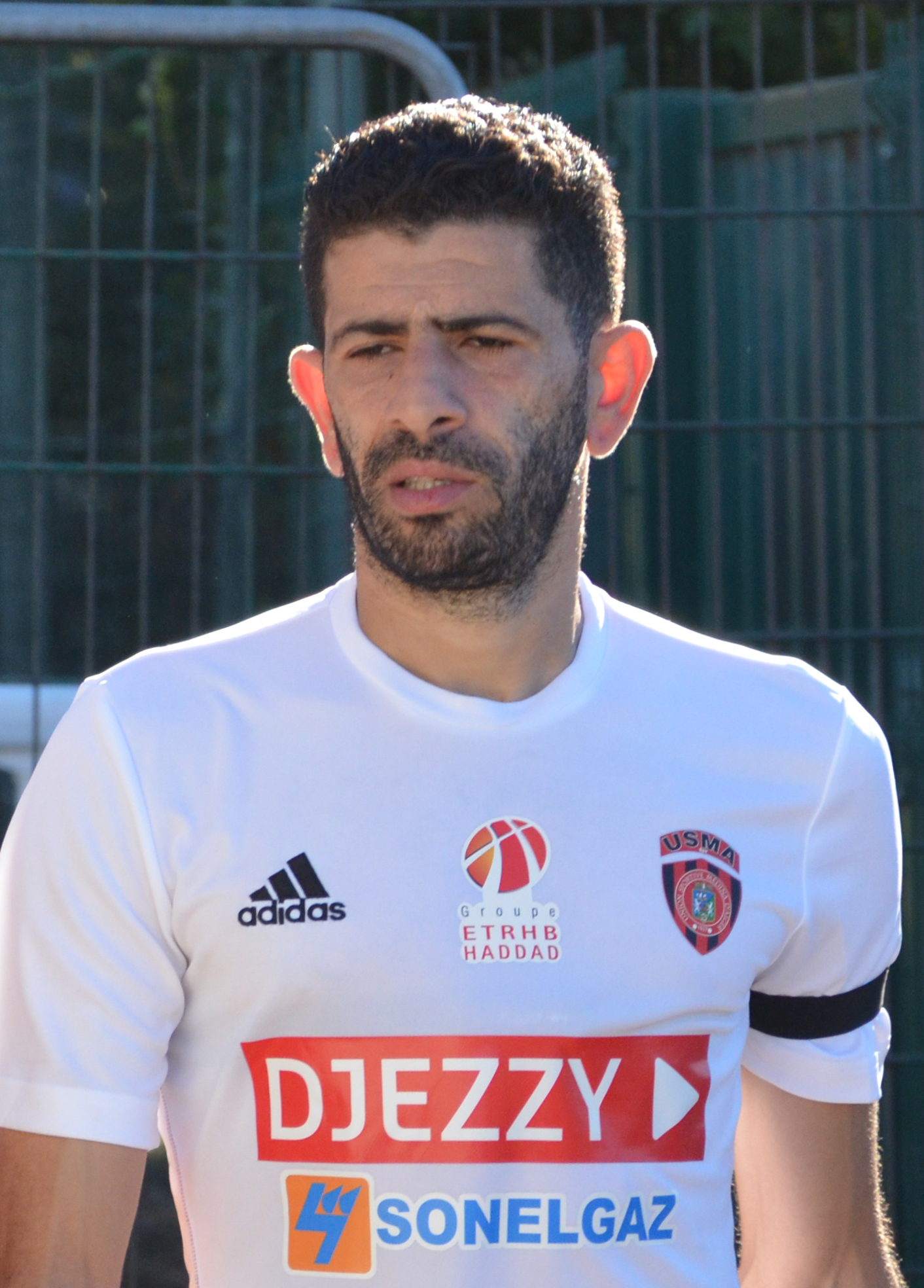
Mohamed Rabie Meftah.

== Notes ==
1. Born in France
