= Mohamed Benkhemassa =

Algerian footballer (born 1993)

Personal information
- Full name: Mohamed Benkhemassa
- Date of birth: 28 June 1993 (age 33)
- Place of birth: Oran, Algeria
- Height: 1.72 m (5 ft 8 in)
- Position: Midfielder

Team information
- Current team: MC Alger
- Number: 6

Youth career
- 2008–2011: MC Oran
- 2011–2012: FAF Academy
- 2012–2013: USM Alger
- 2013–2014: USM El Harrach

Senior career*
Years	Team	Apps	(Gls)
2014–2019	USM Alger	95	(2)
2019–2021	Málaga	39	(0)
2022–2023	Ismaily SC	8	(0)
2023–	MC Alger	82	(2)

International career^{‡}
2013–2014	Algeria U20	–	(–)
2014–2016	Algeria U23	21	(2)
2018	Algeria A	1	(0)
2018–	Algeria	5	(0)
- * Club domestic league appearances and goals as of 5 June 2026 ‡ National team caps and goals as of 4 March 2020

Mohamed Benkhemassa (Arabic: محمد بن خماسة; born 28 June 1993) is an Algerian footballer who plays as a midfielder for MC Alger and the Algeria national team.

== Club career ==
Benkhemassa started his career with USM Alger. On 2 September 2019, he signed a three-year deal with Spanish Segunda División side Málaga CF. In 2023, he joined MC Alger.

== International career ==
In 2015, Benkhemassa was part of the Algeria under-23 national team at the 2015 U-23 Africa Cup of Nations in Senegal, where he participated in all the matches and his performance helped the national team qualify for the football tournament at the 2016 Summer Olympics for the first time in 36 years. Benkhemassa was named in the squad for the 2016 Summer Olympics. He participated in two matches at the Olympics, first as a substitute for Rachid Aït-Atmane, against Argentina and second against Portugal as a starter. On 7 June 2018, Benkhemassa made his international debut for Algeria in a friendly match against Portugal in 3–0 loss.

== Career statistics ==
=== Club ===
As of 31 October 2019

Club	Season	League			Cup (Note: Includes the Algerian Cup)		Continental		Other		Total	
Club	Season	Division	Apps	Goals	Apps	Goals	Apps	Goals	Apps	Goals	Apps	Goals
USM Alger	2014–15	Ligue 1	13	1	2	0	3 (Note: All appearance(s) in Champions League)	0	0 (Note: All appearances in Algerian Super Cup)	0	18	1
USM Alger	2015–16	Ligue 1	20	0	—		8	0	—		28	0
USM Alger	2016–17	Ligue 1	17	1	3	0	0	0	1	0	21	1
USM Alger	2017–18	Ligue 1	22	1	2	0	13 (Note: seven appearances in CAF Champions League, six appearances and one goal in CAF Confederation Cup)	1	—		37	2
USM Alger	2018–19	Ligue 1	22	0	1	0	3 (Note: All appearance(s) in CAF Confederation Cup)	0	4 (Note: All appearance(s) in Arab Club Champions Cup)	0	30	0
USM Alger	2019–20	Ligue 1	1	0	—		—		—		1	0
USM Alger	Total		95	3	8	0	27	1	5	0	135	4
Málaga	2019–20	Segunda División	4	0	0	0	—		—		4	0
Career total			99	3	8	0	27	1	5	0	139	4

== Honours ==
=== Club ===
USM Alger

- Algerian Ligue Professionnelle 1 (2): 2015-16, 2018–19
- Algerian Super Cup (1): 2016
- up of Nations runner-up:2015
