= Reda Bellahcene =

French footballer (born 1993)

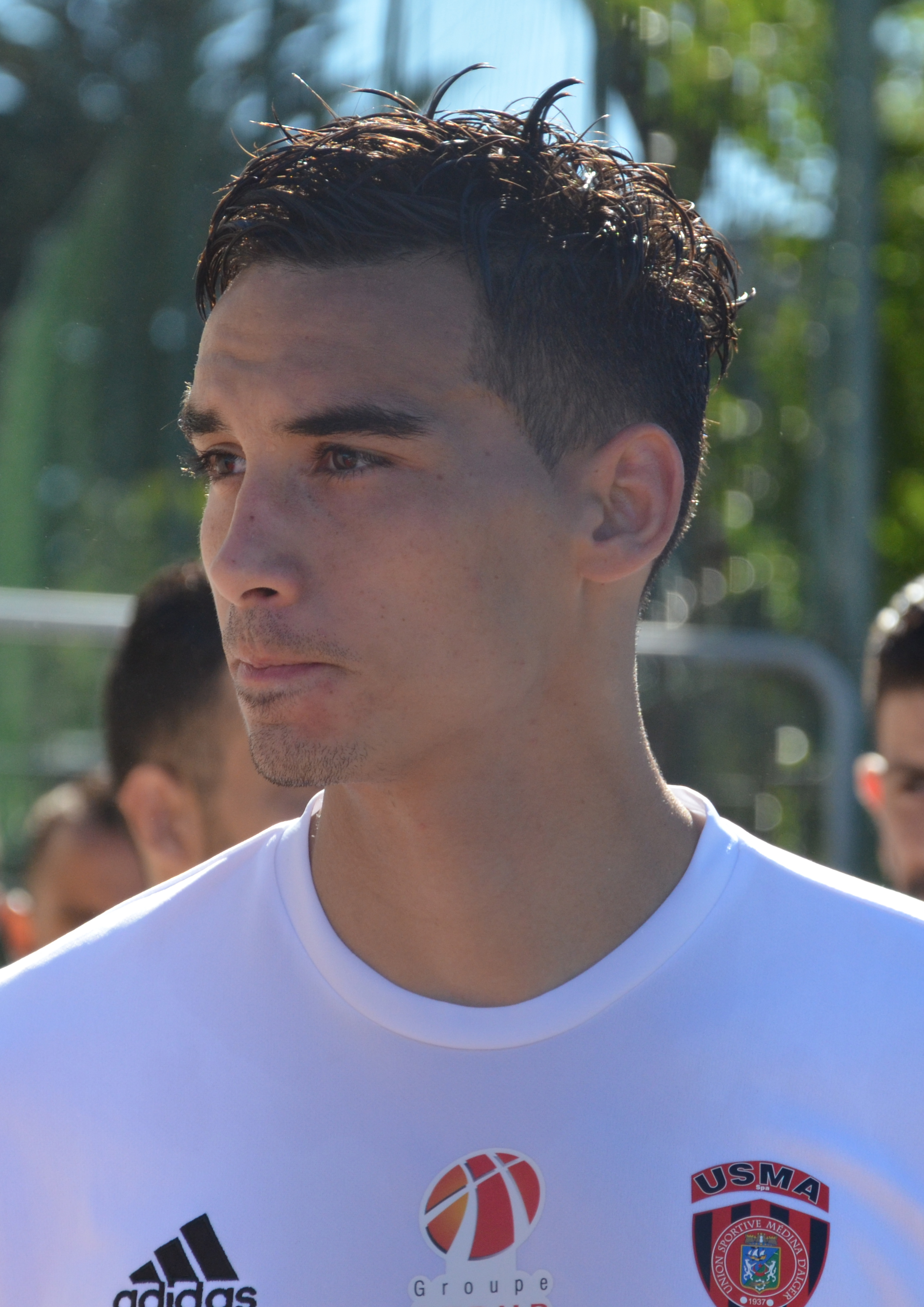
- Bellahcene with USM Alger in 2016

Personal information
- Date of birth: 21 January 1993 (age 33)
- Place of birth: Schiltigheim, France
- Height: 1.89 m (6 ft 2 in)
- Position: Midfielder

Team information
- Current team: Wasquehal

Youth career
- 2009–2012: Schiltigheim

Senior career*
Years	Team	Apps	(Gls)
2012–2015	Schiltigheim	42	(2)
2015–2016	Saint-Louis Neuweg	26	(0)
2016–2018	USM Alger	16	(0)
2018	MO Béjaïa	10	(0)
2019	DRB Tadjenanet	0	(0)
2020	Urartu II	1	(0)
2020	Urartu	0	(0)
2020–2021	Haguenau	9	(0)
2021–2023	Schiltigheim	34	(2)
2023–2025	Biesheim	9	(0)
2025–	Wasquehal		
- * Club domestic league appearances and goals as of 11:08, 1 December 2023 (UTC)

Reda Bellahcene (born 21 January 1993) is a French footballer who plays as a midfielder for Wasquehal.

== Career ==
=== USM Alger ===
Bellahcene was born in Schiltigheim. Formed in Strasbourg, he joined Algerian club USM Alger from Saint-Louis Neuweg of the CFA in 2016. His signed his first professional contract with the champions of Algeria for three years, Bellahcene, who was tenured on 26 occasions in 30 matches so far with St. Louis who finished the season in eighth place in the Group B of the CFA should be an additional asset in the midfield usmiste already expanded by experienced players.

=== Urartu ===
On 2 March 2020, Bellahcene signed for Armenian side FC Urartu.

== Career statistics ==
As of 1 November 2016

Appearances and goals by club, season and competition
Club	Season	League			Cup (Note: Includes the Coupe de France and Algerian Cup)		Continental		Other		Total	
Club	Season	Division	Apps	Goals	Apps	Goals	Apps	Goals	Apps	Goals	Apps	Goals
Schiltigheim	2012–13	CFA 2	2	0	—		—		—		2	0
Schiltigheim	2013–14	CFA 2	24	2	1	0	—		—		25	2
Schiltigheim	2014–15	CFA 2	16	0	0	0	—		—		16	0
Schiltigheim	Total		42	2	1	0	—		—		43	2
Saint-Louis Neuweg	2015–16	CFA	26	0	2	0	—		—		28	0
USM Alger	2016–17	Algerian Ligue 1	1	0	0	0	0	0	1	0	2	0
Career total			69	2	3	0	0	0	1	0	73	2

== Honours ==
USM Alger

- Algerian Super Cup: 2016
