= Ismaïl Mansouri =

Algerian footballer (born 1988)

Personal information
- Full name: Ismaïl Mansouri
- Date of birth: January 7, 1988 (age 38)
- Place of birth: Blida, Algeria
- Height: 1.85 m (6 ft 1 in)
- Position: Goalkeeper

Team information
- Current team: SKAF Khemis Miliana

Senior career*
Years	Team	Apps	(Gls)
2008–2020	USM Alger	65	(0)
2014–2015	→ MO Béjaïa (loan)	16	(0)
2020–2021	MO Béjaïa	0	(0)
2021–	SKAF Khemis Miliana	0	(0)
- * Club domestic league appearances and goals as of 7 March 2020

Ismaïl Mansouri (born January 7, 1988, in Sour El-Ghozlane) is an Algerian football player who plays as a goalkeeper for SKAF Khemis Miliana.

== Club career ==
On October 2, 2010, Mansouri made his professional debut for USM Alger in a league match against MC Saïda.

== Honours ==
=== Club ===
USM Alger

- Algerian Ligue Professionnelle 1 (3): 2013-14, 2015-16, 2018–19
- Algerian Cup (1): 2013
- Algerian Super Cup (2): 2013, 2016
- UAFA Club Cup (1): 2013

MO Béjaïa

- Algerian Cup: 2015
