= Abel Khaled =

French-Algerian footballer (born 1992)

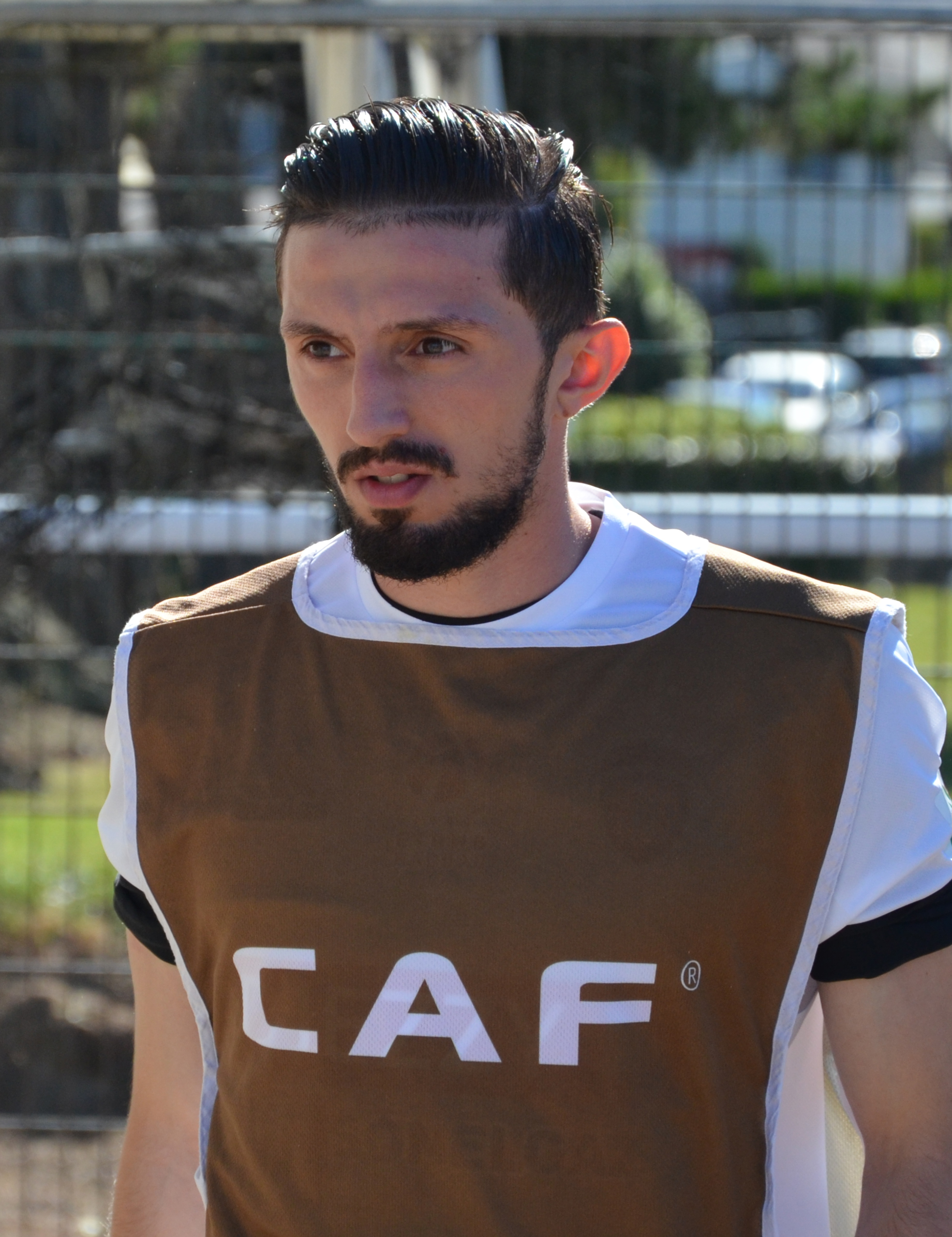

Personal information
- Full name: Abel Khaled
- Date of birth: 9 November 1992 (age 34)
- Place of birth: France
- Height: 1.79 m (5 ft 10 in)
- Position: Right winger

Team information
- Current team: Amnéville

Senior career*
Years	Team	Apps	(Gls)
2010–2011	SAS Épinal	14	(2)
2012–2015	Brest	37	(1)
2012–2015	Brest B	29	(3)
2015–2016	RC Arbaâ	19	(1)
2016–2017	USM Alger	2	(0)
2017–2018	DRB Tadjenanet	14	(2)
2018–2019	SR Delémont	6	(0)
2019	US Mondorf	4	(0)
2020–	Amnéville	4	(1)
- * Club domestic league appearances and goals as of 21:27, 15 May 2020 (UTC)

Abel Khaled (born 9 November 1992) is a French—Algerian footballer who plays as a right winger for CSO Amnéville in the Championnat National 3.

== Career ==
=== SR Delémont ===
Khaled signed with SR Delémont on 28 November 2018.

== Honours ==
=== Club ===
USM Alger

- Algerian Super Cup (1): 2016
