= Adel Amrouche =

Algerian footballer and manager (born 1968)

Personal information
- Date of birth: 7 March 1968 (age 58)
- Place of birth: Kouba, Algiers, Algeria
- Position: Midfielder

Youth career
- 1983–1985: CR Belouizdad
- 1985–1988: JS Kabylie

Senior career*
Years	Team	Apps	(Gls)
1988–1990	OMR El Annasser		
1990–1991	USM Alger		
1991–1992	OMR El Annasser		
1992–1993	Favoritner AC		
1994–????	La Louviére		
- Mons

Managerial career
- 1995–1996: FC Brussels (Technical Director)
- 1996–2002: R.U. Saint-Gilloise (General Director)
- 2002–2004: DC Motema Pembe
- 2004: Equatorial Guinea
- 2005: FC Volyn Lutsk (Technical Director)
- 2005: FK Genclerbirliyi
- 2005–2006: DC Motema Pembe
- 2006–2007: R.U. Saint-Gilloise (Technical Director)
- 2007–2012: Burundi
- 2013–2014: Kenya
- 2016: USM Alger
- 2018: Libya
- 2018–2019: MC Alger
- 2019–2022: Botswana
- 2022: Yemen
- 2023–2024: Tanzania
- 2025–2026: Rwanda
- * Club domestic league appearances and goals

Adel Amrouche (Arabic: عَادِل عَمرُوش; born 7 March 1968) is an Algerian football manager and former player who most recently managed Rwanda. Having spent a large part of his career in Belgium, where he clinched his UEFA trainer-licence, Amrouche also has Belgian nationality.

== Club career ==
Amrouche began his playing career in the junior ranks of CA Kouba. He played for a number of Algerian clubs including CR Belouizdad, USM Alger, JS Kabylie, OMR El Annasser, Olympique de Médéa and AS Ain M'lila. He then moved to Austria briefly to play for Favoritner AC. After that, he played for a number of Belgian clubs like La Louviére and Mons, as well as amateur clubs KAV Dendermonde and SK Lombeek.

== Managerial career ==
Amrouche began his managerial career in 1988 by coaching the youth ranks of local club OMR El Annasser while playing for the senior team. He held the same role during his playing stints with USM Alger and RC Kouba.

In 2002, he was appointed as the manager of Congolese club Daring Club Motema Pembe.

In 2007, Amrouche became the coach of the Burundi national team. On 1 January 2011, Amrouche turned down an offer to take over the vacant managerial role of Algerian club ES Sétif, preferring to continue in his role with the Burundi national team. On 29 February 2012, Amrouche resigned as the manager of Burundi, just a day after a 2–1 win against Zimbabwe in the 2013 Africa Cup of Nations qualifiers.

In February 2013, Amrouche was named coach of the Kenya national team taking over the position from James Nandwa who was there on temporary basis after the departure of Henri Michel. He stayed 18months with Kenya national team.

He managed USM Alger in 2016.

He became manager of the Libya national team in May 2018. He resigned from the position in October 2018.

He then managed MC Alger.

In August 2019 he became manager of Botswana.

In March 2023 he became the head coach of Tanzania and lead them to the Africa Cup of Nations in Ivory Coast.

In January 2024, Amrouche was suspended by the Tanzania Football Federation, after he was given an eight-match ban and fined $10,000 by the Confederation of African Football (CAF). This ban was given for suggesting that Morocco has influence in CAF to manipulate the match scheduling and officiating.

In March 2025, he became the head coach of Rwanda
