= Rabie Meftah =

Algerian footballer (born 1985)

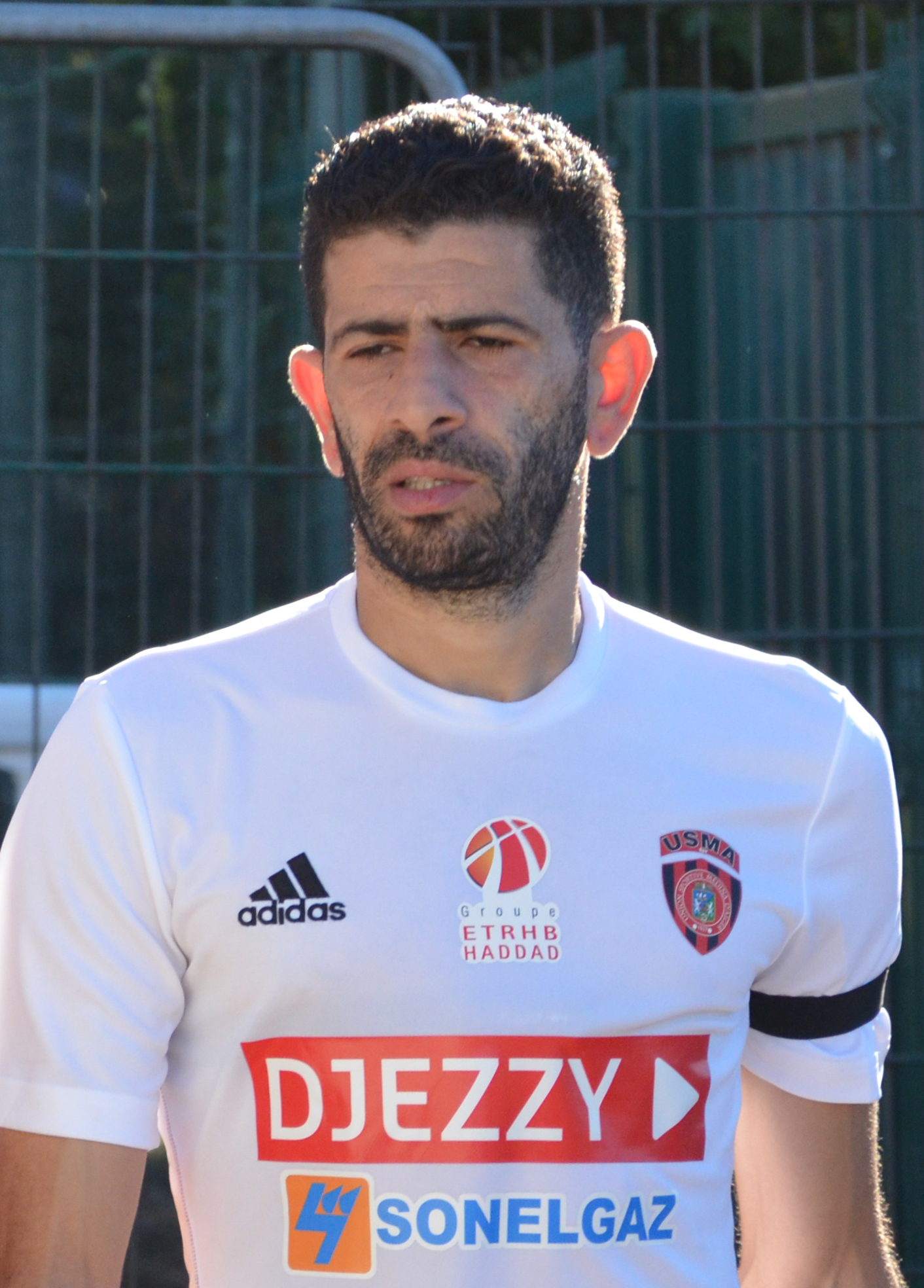
- Meftah with USM Alger in 2016

Personal information
- Date of birth: May 5, 1985 (age 41)
- Place of birth: Tizi Ouzou, Algeria
- Height: 1.79 m (5 ft 10 in)
- Position: Right-back

Youth career
- –2004: JS Kabylie

Senior career*
Years	Team	Apps	(Gls)
2004–2010	JS Kabylie	127	(13)
2010–2011	JSM Béjaïa	24	(6)
2011–2020	USM Alger	188	(38)
2020–2021	NA Hussein Dey	28	(10)
2021–2022	AS Aïn M'lila		

International career
2006–2017	Algeria	24	(0)
2007	Algeria U23	4	(0)

Managerial career
- 2023–2024: JSM Béjaïa
- 2024-: USMA (U21)
- * Club domestic league appearances and goals

Mohamed Rabie Meftah (born May 5, 1985) is an Algerian football coach and former professional player.

== Personal life ==
Meftah comes from a family of footballers. His cousin Mahieddine Meftah was a former Algerian international and played for JS Kabylie and USM Alger. Another cousin, Rahim Meftah, was also a former player who played for the two clubs, as well as MO Constantine. Two other cousins, Chaâbane Meftah and Jugurtha Meftah are also footballers and currently play for JS Kabylie.

== Club career ==
=== JS Kabylie ===
A product of the JS Kabylie junior ranks, Meftah was promoted to the first team in 2004. After a couple of seasons, he became a regular starter, forcing Algerian international Slimane Raho to the bench, and eventually out the door. In 2008, he was made captain of the club, replacing midfielder Chérif Abdeslam.

Meftah was chosen as the top player in the Algerian Championnat National for the 2008–09 season in a vote conducted by sports daily newspaper Maracana.

At the end of the 2009–10 season, and despite the club qualifying for the group stage of the 2010 CAF Champions League, Meftah announced that was he leaving the club.

=== JSM Béjaïa ===
On June 20, 2010, Meftah signed a one-year contract with JSM Béjaïa.

=== USM Alger ===
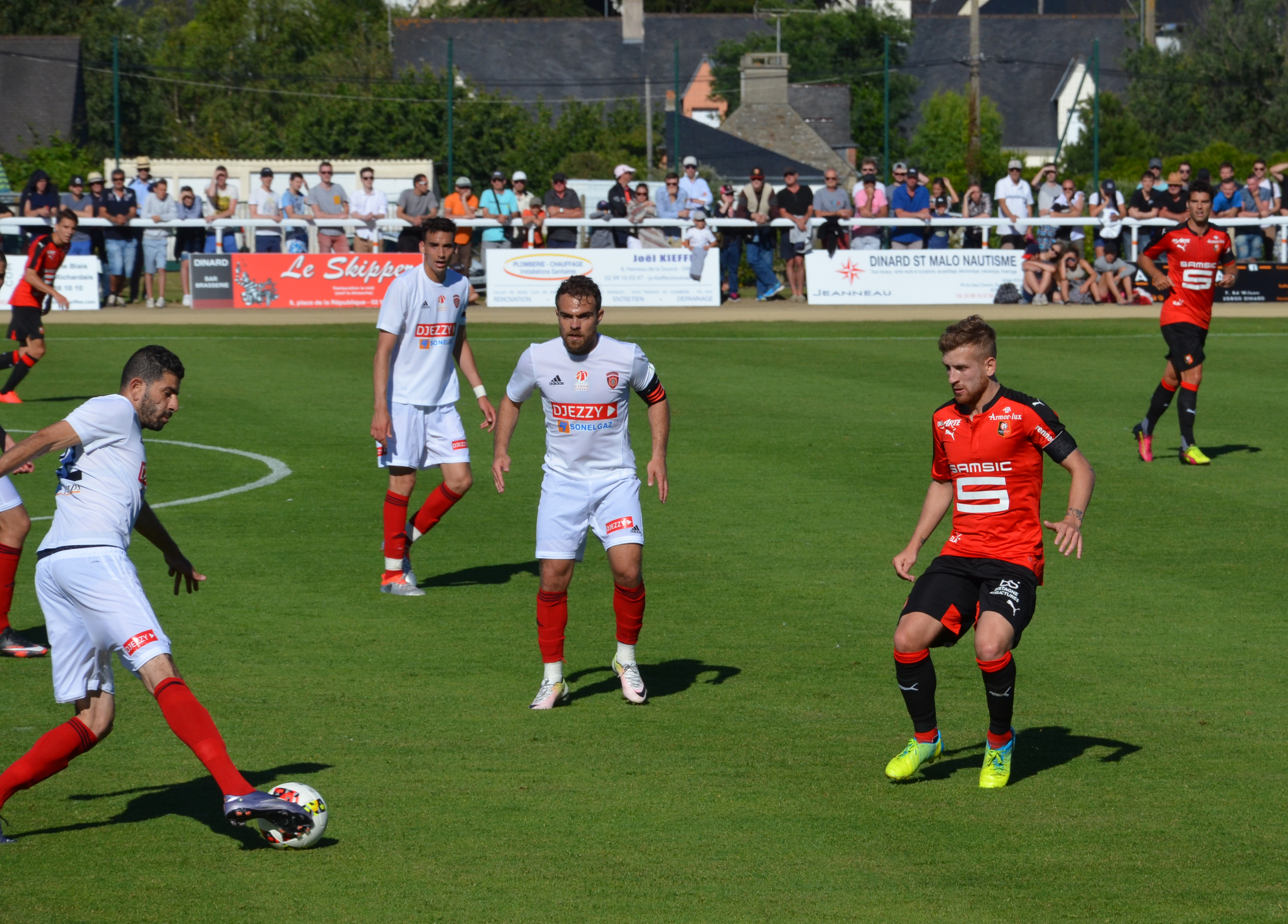
Mohamed Rabie Meftah in 2016 against Stade Rennais.

On July 12, 2010, Mohamed Rabie Meftah signed a two-year contract with USM Alger. He made his debut for the team in the Ligue 1 as a starter during a win against CA Batna 1–0, Meftah's first goal was against WA Tlemcen in 1–1 draw away from home, In the following 2012–13 season Meftah achieved his first title with USM Alger where he won the first Algerian Cup in its history after beating MC Alger 1–0. two weeks After that Meftah achieved the second title in the UAFA Club Cup against Al-Arabi SC, where he scored the goal of winning the title from a penalty kick. Next season Meftah Scored four goals first was against his former club JS Kabylie from a penalty kick in a 3–2 home win. and the last goal was against MC Oran in a match that ended with 5–2 victory, Meftah he eventually won the 2013–14 Ligue 1 title for the third time in its history.

In the 2015 CAF Champions League, Meftah made the best continental achievement in his career when he reached the final and defeated his team against TP Mazembe, Meftah missed the two matches due to suspension. in the same season he won the league title for the second time and scored in this season nine goals. On June 7, 2016, Mohamed Rabie Meftah renewed his contract for three seasons until 2020, On 2016–17 season Meftah won his second Super Cup title against MC Alger and scored the second goal. On March 30, 2018, against CR Belouizdad Meftah played his 300th match in the Algerian Ligue Professionnelle 1 also Meftah was USM Alger's top scorer this season with 11 goals the best in his football career. In the 2018–19 season Meftah achieved his last title with USM Alger by winning the championship, where is the decisive match against CS Constantine He scored the third goal in the last minutes.

On January 16, 2020, in the summit match against JS Kabylie Meftah assaulted Hamza Banouh. After that meftah apologized to the player and all the fans later LFP punished him with three games. On July 25, 2020, Meftah stated that he will leave USM Alger after Sporting director Antar Yahia told him that the new coach of USM Alger does not want him. Meftah, said he spent nine wonderful years with the club from his heart played 258 matches and scored 49 goals most scoring defender in the club's history and achieving seven titles.

=== NA Hussein Dey ===
On September 7, 2020, Meftah signed a two-year contract with NA Hussein Dey.

=== AS Aïn M'lila ===
In October, he signed for AS Aïn M'lila in the Algerian Ligue 2.

He retired at the end of the 2021–22 season.

== International career ==
On August 15, 2006, Meftah made his debut for the Algerian National Team in a friendly against Gabon. Meftah has made five appearances in total for the Algerian National Team since his debut in 2006. He was selected as a reserve player by Rabah Saadane for the 2010 African Cup of Nations and 2010 FIFA World Cup but did not make the final squad both times.

Meftah has also made four appearances for the Algeria A' team, the local team which participates in the African Championship of Nations.

== Managerial career ==
On April 18, 2023, he was appointed as manager of Algerian Inter-Régions Division side JSM Béjaïa, with the club in 8th position. His contract was terminated in February 2024 following a poor run of results.

== Career statistics ==
=== Club ===
As of August 24, 2021

Appearances and goals by club, season and competition
Club	Season	League			Cup		Continental		Other		Total	
Club	Season	Division	Apps	Goals	Apps	Goals	Apps	Goals	Apps	Goals	Apps	Goals
JS Kabylie	2005–06	National 1	18	2	5	0	10 (Note: Appearance(s) in Champions League)	0	—		33	2
JS Kabylie	2006–07	National 1	24	1	3	0	8	0	1 (Note: Appearances in Algerian Super Cup)	0	36	1
JS Kabylie	2007–08	National 1	24	1	1	0	11 (Note: Four appearances in CAF Champions League, seven appearances in CAF Confederation Cup)	0	—		36	1
JS Kabylie	2008–09	National 1	27	6	1	0	—		—		28	6
JS Kabylie	2009–10	National 1	28	2	5	0	5	1	—		38	3
JS Kabylie	Total		121	12	15	0	34	1	1	0	171	13
JSM Béjaïa	2010–11	Ligue 1	24	6	2	0	—		—		26	6
USM Alger	2011–12	Ligue 1	23	3	2	0	—		—		25	3
USM Alger	2012–13	Ligue 1	16	1	3	0	1 (Note: Appearance(s) in CAF Confederation Cup)	0	4 (Note: Appearance(s) in UAFA Club Cup)	1	24	2
USM Alger	2013–14	Ligue 1	25	4	2	0	—		1	0	28	4
USM Alger	2014–15	Ligue 1	27	5	3	0	4	2	1	0	35	7
USM Alger	2015–16	Ligue 1	19	8	1	0	6	1	—		26	9
USM Alger	2016–17	Ligue 1	29	9	2	1	3	0	1	1	35	11
USM Alger	2017–18	Ligue 1	19	1	2	1	12 (Note: Seven appearances in CAF Champions League, five appearances in CAF Confederation Cup)	0	—		33	2
USM Alger	2018–19	Ligue 1	14	2	2	0	6	0	4 (Note: Appearance(s) in Arab Club Champions Cup)	1	26	3
USM Alger	2019–20	Ligue 1	16	5	1	0	9	3	—		26	8
USM Alger	Total		188	38	18	2	41	6	11	3	258	49
NA Hussein Dey	2020–21	Ligue 1	28	10	—		—		2 (Note: Appearances in Algerian League Cup)	0	30	10
Career total			361	66	35	2	75	7	14	3	487	78

== Honours ==
JS Kabylie

- Algerian Ligue Professionnelle 1: 2005–06, 2007–08

USM Alger

- Algerian Ligue Professionnelle 1: 2013–14, 2015–16, 2018–19
- Algerian Cup: 2013
- Algerian Super Cup: 2013, 2016
- UAFA Club Cup: 2013
- CAF Champions League runner-up: 2015

Individual

- CAF Team of the Year: 2015
