= Mokhtar Benmoussa =

Algerian footballer (born 1986)

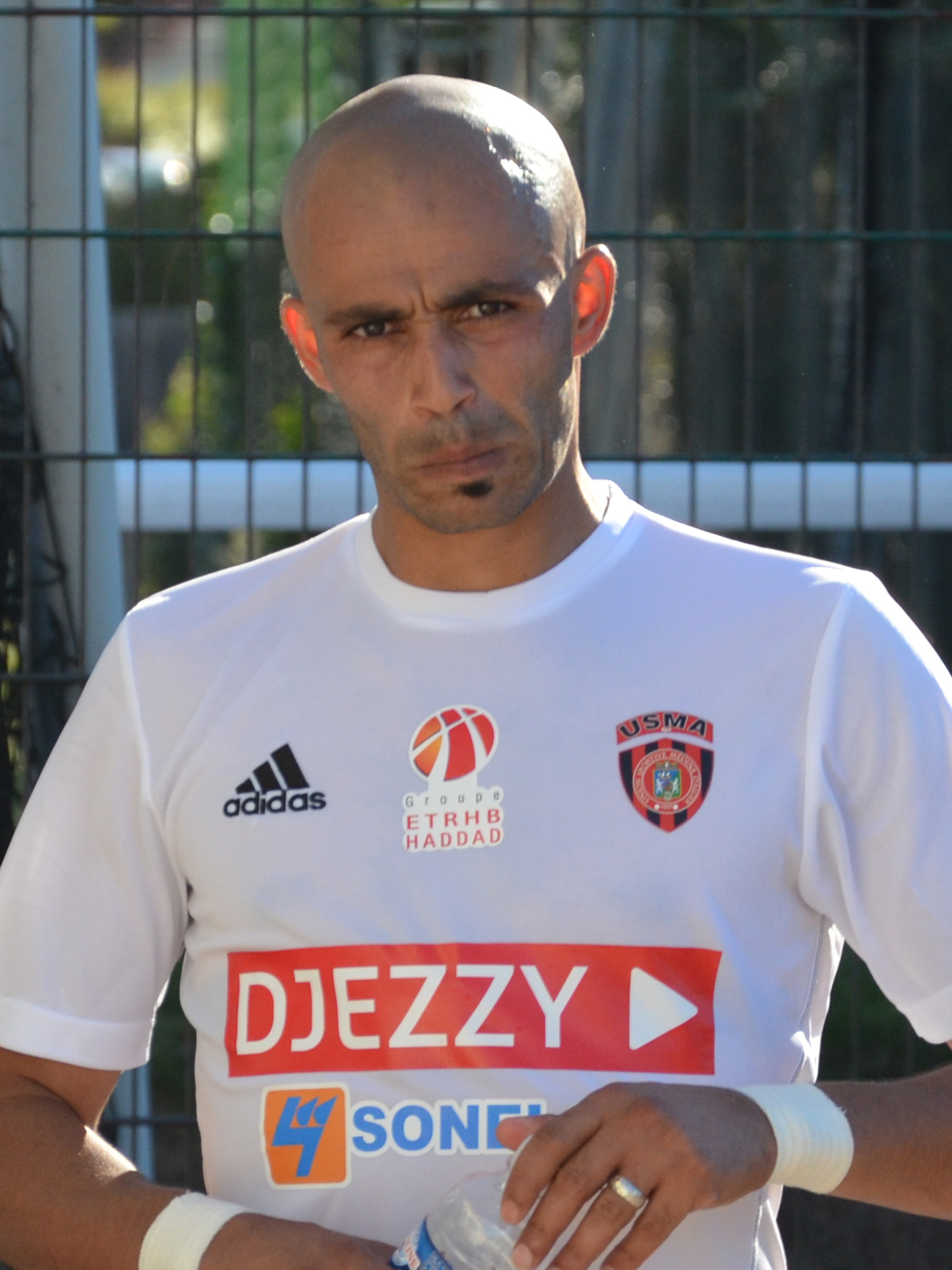
- Benmoussa in 2016

Personal information
- Date of birth: 11 August 1986 (age 40)
- Place of birth: Tlemcen, Algeria
- Height: 1.76 m (5 ft 9 in)
- Position: Left winger

Youth career
- WA Tlemcen

Senior career*
Years	Team	Apps	(Gls)
2004–2006	WA Tlemcen	31	(7)
2006–2007	Paradou AC	21	(2)
2007–2010	WA Tlemcen		
2010–2012	ES Sétif	50	(9)
2012–2019	USM Alger	150	(11)
2019	USM Bel Abbès	1	(0)

International career
2002–2003	Algeria U17	2	(0)
2006–2007	Algeria U23	4	(1)
2010–?	Algeria A'	2	(0)
2012–2018	Algeria	8	(0)
- * Club domestic league appearances and goals

Mokhtar Benmoussa (born 11 August 1986) is an Algerian former professional footballer. He played primarily as a left winger but was also used as a left midfielder and a left-back. Benmoussa is a former Algeria youth international and represented Algeria at the U17 and U23 levels. He also earned eight caps for the Algeria national team.

== Club career ==
Born in Tlemcen, Benmoussa began his career with his hometown club of WA Tlemcen.

On 10 June 2010, Benmoussa signed a one-year contract with ES Sétif.

== International career ==
On 8 April 2012, Benmoussa was called up by Algeria national team coach Vahid Halilhodžić for a four-day training camp for domestic players.

On 12 May 2012, Benmoussa was called up for the first time to the Algeria national team for the 2014 FIFA World Cup qualifiers against Mali and Rwanda, and the return leg of the 2013 Africa Cup of Nations qualifier against Gambia.

== Honours ==
ES Sétif

- Algerian Ligue Professionnelle 1: 2011–12
- Algerian Cup: 2012

USM Alger

- Algerian Ligue Professionnelle 1: 2013–14, 2015–16, 2018–19
- Algerian Cup: 2013
- Algerian Super Cup: 2013, 2016
- UAFA Club Cup: 2013
