= 2016 Algerian Super Cup =

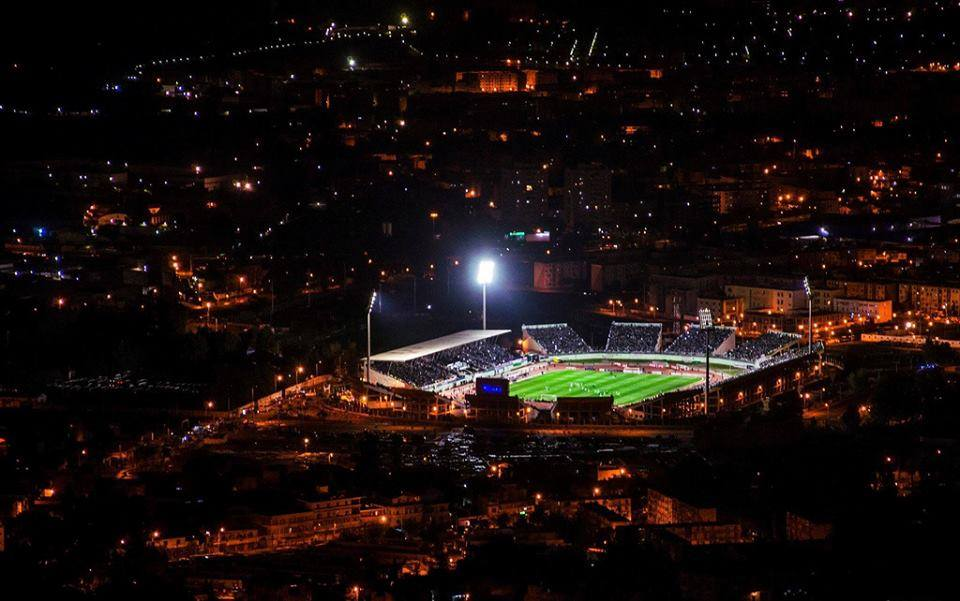
- Mustapha Tchaker Stadium hosted the match
USM Alger	MC Alger
Ligue 1	Algerian Cup
2	0
- Date: 1 November 2016
- Venue: Mustapha Tchaker Stadium, Blida
- Referee: Mohamed Benouza
- Attendance: 18,000

The 2016 Algerian Super Cup was the 10th edition of Algerian Super Cup, a football match contested by the winners of the 2015–16 Algerian Ligue Professionnelle 1 and 2015–16 Algerian Cup competitions. The match was played on November 1, 2016, at Mustapha Tchaker Stadium in Blida. Ligue 1 winners USM Alger defeated Algerian Cup winners MC Alger with a score of 2-0.

== Match details ==
1 November 2016 (Note: Match rescheduled due to share some of their players in the Football at the 2016 Summer Olympics first date was August 13, 2016.)
17:45

USM Alger	2–0	MC Alger
Chafaï 61'; Meftah 77' (pen.)	Report

Mustapha Tchaker Stadium, Blida (Note: The final of the Algerian Super Cup in 2016 between USM Alger and MC Alger will be relocated to the Mustapha Tchaker Stadium in Blida instead of July 5, 1962 Stadium.)
Attendance: 18.000
Referee: Mohamed Benouza

GK	1	(Algeria) Lamine Zemmamouche
LB	3	(Algeria) Ayoub Abdellaoui	(yellow card) 43'
CB	5	(Algeria) Mohamed Benyahia
CB	6	(Algeria) Farouk Chafaï
CB	20	(Algeria) Nacereddine Khoualed		(substituted off) 18'
RB	22	(Algeria) Rabie Meftah (c)
CM	23	(Algeria) Hamza Koudri		(substituted off) 82'
CM	24	(Algeria) Mohammed Benkhemassa	(yellow card) 38'
LW	11	(Algeria) Abderrahmane Meziane
RW	7	(Algeria) Rafik Bouderbal
CF	29	(Ivory Coast) Ghislain Guessan		(substituted off) 86'
Substitutes :
DF	25	(Algeria) Mokhtar Benmoussa		(substituted on) 18'
MF	26	(Algeria) Reda Bellahcene		(substituted on) 82'
FW	9	(Madagascar) Carolus Andriamatsinoro		(substituted on) 86'
Manager :
(Algeria) Mustapha Aksouh

GK	30	(Algeria) Farid Chaâl	(yellow card) 75'
DF	24	(Algeria) Abdelghani Demmou
DF	27	(Algeria) Abderahmane Hachoud (c)	(yellow card) 80'
DF	15	(Algeria) Zidane Mebarakou	(yellow card) 40'
DF	6	(Algeria) Brahim Boudebouda	(yellow card) 44' (yellow-red card) 64'
MF	14	(Algeria) Amir Karaoui
MF	23	(Algeria) Antar Boucherit
MF	21	(Algeria) Zahir Zerdab
MF	5	(Algeria) Abdelmalek Mokdad
FW	10	(Algeria) Sid Ahmed Aouedj		(substituted off) 70'
FW	19	(Algeria) Hadj Bouguèche		(substituted off) 68'
Substitutes :
FW	18	(Algeria) Mohamed Seguer		(substituted on) 70'
MF	22	(Algeria) Ayoub Azzi		(substituted on) 68'
Manager :
(Algeria) Djamel Menad

== See also ==
- 2015–16 Algerian Ligue Professionnelle 1
- 2015–16 Algerian Cup
