= 2015–16 Algerian Ligue Professionnelle 1 =

Algerian Ligue Professionnelle 1
- Season: 2015–16
- Dates: 15 August 2015 – 27 May 2016
- Champions: USM Alger; 2nd Ligue 1 title 7th Algerian title
- Relegated: RC Arbaâ; ASM Oran; USM Blida
- Champions League: USM Alger; JS Saoura
- Confederation Cup: MC Alger; JS Kabylie
- Matches: 240
- Goals: 512 (2.13 per match)
- Top goalscorer: Mohamed Zubya (13 goals)
- Best goalkeeper: Faouzi Chaouchi (16 clean sheets)
- Biggest home win: 4 matches: ASM Oran 4–0 CS Constantine (30 October 2015); JS Saoura 4–0 ASM Oran (25 December 2015); JS Saoura 4–0 NA Hussein Dey (12 February 2016); USM Alger 4–0 RC Arbaâ (12 March 2016)
- Biggest away win: ASM Oran 1-5 MO Béjaïa (2 April 2016)
- Highest scoring: 5 matches: MC Oran 3–3 MO Béjaïa (29 August 2015); MC Oran 3–3 CR Belouizdad (19 September 2015); JS Kabylie 4–2 USM El Harrach (24 October 2015); MC Alger 3–3 RC Arbaâ (29 October 2015); RC Relizane 5–1 USM Blida (28 November 2015)
- Longest winning run: 7 matches USM Alger
- Longest unbeaten run: 17 matches USM Alger
- Longest winless run: 12 matches ASM Oran
- Longest losing run: 10 matches ASM Oran
- All statistics correct as of 27 May 2016.

The 2015–16 Algerian Ligue Professionnelle 1 was the 54th season of the Algerian Ligue Professionnelle 1 since its establishment in 1962. A total of 16 teams contested the league.

ES Sétif came into the season as defending champions of the 2014–15 season. USM Blida, DRB Tadjenanet, and RC Relizane entered as the three promoted teams from the 2014–15 Algerian Ligue Professionnelle 2.

On 30 April 2016, USM Alger officially won the title for professional league. This was the football club's 7th title.

== Teams ==
Team	Stadium	Capacity
ASM Oran	Habib Bouakeul Stadium	20,000
CR Belouizdad	20 August 1955 Stadium	15,000
CS Constantine	Chahid Hamlaoui Stadium	35,000
DRB Tadjenanet	Smaïl Lahoua Stadium	9,000
ES Sétif	8 May 1945 Stadium	25,000
JS Kabylie	1 November 1954 Stadium	25,000
JS Saoura	20 August 1955 Stadium	20,000
MC Alger	Omar Hamadi Stadium	17,000
MC Oran	Ahmed Zabana Stadium	40,000
MO Béjaïa	Maghrebi Unity Stadium	25,000
NA Hussein Dey	20 August 1955 Stadium	15,000
RC Arbaâ	Ismaïl Makhlouf Stadium	8,000
RC Relizane	Tahar Zoughari Stadium	30,000
USM Alger	Omar Hamadi Stadium	17,000
USM Blida	Mustapha Tchaker Stadium	40,000
USM El Harrach	1 November 1954 Stadium	8,000

== Personnel and kits ==
Team	Chairman	Head coach	Manufacturer	Sponsors
ASM Oran	(Algeria) Mohamed El Morro	(Algeria) Kamel Mouassa	Sarson	ATM Mobilis
CR Belouizdad	(Algeria) Réda Malek	(France) Alain Michel	Nike	Ooredoo, CNEP Banque
CS Constantine	(Algeria) Mohamed Haddad	(France) Hubert Velud	Macron	Tassili Airlines, ATM Mobilis
DRB Tadjenanet	(Algeria)	(Algeria) Liamine Bougherara		
ES Sétif	(Algeria) Hassan Hammar	(Algeria) Kheirredine Madoui	Joma	Djezzy GSM
JS Kabylie	(Algeria) Mohand Chérif Hannachi	(France) Dominique Bijotat	Luanvi	Ooredoo
JS Saoura	(Algeria) Mohamed Zerouati	(France) Bernard Simondi	KCS	Enafor
MC Alger	(Algeria) Abdelkrim Raissi	(Portugal) Artur Jorge	Joma	Djezzy GSM, Sonatrach
MC Oran	(Algeria) Ahmed Belhadj	(France) Jean-Michel Cavalli	Sarson	Naftal, Ooredoo, Aigle Azur
MO Béjaïa	(Algeria) Nacer Maouche	(Switzerland) Alain Geiger	Macron	ATM Mobilis
NA Hussein Dey	(Algeria) Mahfoud Ould Zmirli	(Algeria) Abdelkader Yaiche	Joma	ATM Mobilis
RC Arbaâ	(Algeria) Djamel Amani	(Algeria) Billel Dziri	Joma	ATM Mobilis
RC Relizane	(Algeria) Djilali Azzi	(Algeria) Omar Belatoui		
USM Alger	(Algeria) Ali Haddad	(Algeria) Miloud Hamdi (C)	adidas	Djezzy GSM, ETRHB Haddad, Sonelgaz
USM Blida	(Algeria) Mohamed Douidene	(Algeria) Djamel Benchadli	Sarson	ATM Mobilis
USM El Harrach	(Algeria) Mohamed Laïb	(Algeria) Boualem Charef	Patrick	ATM Mobilis

=== Managerial changes ===
Managerial changes during the 2012-13 campaign.

==== Pre-season ====
Team	Outgoing manager	Manner of departure	Date of vacancy	Position in table	Incoming manager	Date of appointment
CS Constantine	(France) François Bracci	Sacked	2 July 2015	Pre-season	(France) Hubert Velud	2 July 2015

==== During the season ====
Team	Outgoing manager	Manner of departure	Date of vacancy	Position in table	Incoming manager	Date of appointment
JS Kabylie	(Algeria) Mourad Karouf	Sacked	16 August 2015	15th	(France) Dominique Bijotat	25 August 2015
RC Relizane	(Algeria) Omar Belatoui	Sacked	6 September 2015	11th	(Algeria) Abdelkrim Benyellès	25 September 2015
RC Arbaâ	(Algeria) Billel Dziri	Sacked	10 September 2015	16th	(Serbia) Darko Janacković	12 September 2015
MO Béjaïa	(Switzerland) Alain Geiger	Resigned	13 September 2015	6th	(Algeria) Abdelkader Amrani	16 September 2015
JS Saoura	(France) Bernard Simondi	Resigned	3 October 2015	9th	(Algeria) Karim Khouda	4 October 2015
MC Alger	(Portugal) Artur Jorge	Sacked	8 October 2015	4th	(Algeria) Meziane Ighil	13 October 2015
USM Blida	(Algeria) Djamel Benchadli	Sacked	9 October 2015	12th	(Algeria) Mohamed Bacha	10 October 2015
CS Constantine	(France) Hubert Velud	Resigned	18 October 2015	10th	(France) Didier Gomes Da Rosa	5 November 2015
RC Arbaâ	(Serbia) Darko Janacković	Sacked	20 October 2015	16th	(Algeria) Khaled Lounici	29 January 2016
ES Sétif	(Algeria) Kheïreddine Madoui	Resigned	8 November 2015	7th	(Switzerland) Alain Geiger	14 November 2015
ASM Oran	(Algeria) Kamel Mouassa	Sacked	24 November 2015	15th	(Algeria) Nabil Medjahed	4 December 2015
MC Oran	(France) Jean-Michel Cavalli	Sacked	2 December 2015	11th	(Algeria) Fouad Bouali	6 December 2015
RC Relizane	(Algeria) Abdelkrim Benyellès	Resigned	2 January 2016	14th	(France) François Bracci	5 January 2016
RC Relizane	(France) François Bracci	Resigned	25 January 2016	14th	(Algeria) Mohamed Henkouche	28 January 2016
MC Alger	(Algeria) Meziane Ighil	Sacked	6 February 2016	5th	(Algeria) (C)	8 February 2016
USM Blida	(Algeria) Mohamed Bacha	Sacked	14 February 2016	13th	(Algeria) Zoheïr Djelloul	16 February 2016
RC Arbaâ	(Algeria) Khaled Lounici	Resigned	20 February 2016	16th		
JS Kabylie	(France) Dominique Bijotat	Resigned	12 March 2016	12th	(Algeria) Kamel Mouassa	14 March 2016

=== Foreign players ===
Club	Visa 1	Visa 2	Visa 3
ASM Oran	(Niger) Mohamed Chikoto		
CR Belouizdad	(Cameroon) Gilles Ngomo	(Benin) Mohamed Aoudou	
CS Constantine	(Madagascar) Paulin Voavy	(Ivory Coast) Koro Koné	(Mauritania) Moulaye Ahmed
DRB Tadjenanet	(Cameroon) Azongha Tembeng	(Republic of the Congo) Lorry Nkolo	
ES Sétif	(Madagascar) Ibrahim Amada	(Central African Republic) Eudes Dagoulou	
JS Kabylie	(Burkina Faso) Banou Diawara	(Burkina Faso) Patrick Malo	
JS Saoura	(Cameroon) Jean Jules Bapidi Fils		
MC Alger			
MC Oran	(Libya) Mohamed Zubya		
MO Béjaïa	(Mali) Soumaila Sidibe	(Senegal) Waliou Ndoye	(Chad) Morgan Betorangal
NA Hussein Dey	(Gabon) Samson Mbingui		
RC Arbaâ	(Ivory Coast) Konan N'Guessan Ghislain		
RC Relizane	(Ivory Coast) Manucho		
USM Alger	(Madagascar) Carolus Andria		
USM Blida	(Guinea) Ibrahim Khalil Sylla		
USM El Harrach	(Guinea) Mohamed Coumbassa		

== Results ==
=== League table ===
Pos	Team	Pld	W	D	L	GF	GA	GD	Pts	Qualification or relegation
1	USM Alger (C)	30	17	7	6	49	31	+18	58	Qualification for the Champions League first round
2	JS Saoura	30	12	12	6	39	25	+14	48	Qualification for the Champions League preliminary round
3	JS Kabylie	30	12	9	9	27	27	0	45 (Note: JS Kabylie ahead of CR Belouizdad on head-to-head record: JSK–CRB 1–0, CRB–JSK 1–1.)	Qualification for the Confederation Cup preliminary round
4	CR Belouizdad	30	11	12	7	40	29	+11	45	
5	ES Sétif	30	11	11	8	31	19	+12	44 (Note: ES Sétif ahead of MO Béjaïa on head-to-head record: ESS–MOB 0–0, MOB–ESS 0–0.)	
6	MO Béjaïa	30	11	11	8	33	23	+10	44	
7	DRB Tadjenanet	30	11	10	9	32	30	+2	43	
8	CS Constantine	30	11	9	10	26	32	−6	42	
9	USM El Harrach	30	10	11	9	28	27	+1	41	
10	MC Oran	30	9	13	8	40	35	+5	40 (Note: MC Oran ahead of NA Hussein Dey on head-to-head record: MCO–NAH 1–0, NAH–MCO 1–0.)	
11	NA Hussein Dey	30	10	10	10	31	35	−4	40	Qualification for the Arab Club Championship group stage
12	MC Alger	30	8	14	8	28	26	+2	38	Qualification for the Confederation Cup preliminary round
13	RC Relizane	30	8	12	10	36	35	+1	36 (Note: RC Relizane ahead of USM Blida on head-to-head record: RCR–USB 5–2, USB–RCR 1–0.)	
14	USM Blida (R)	30	7	15	8	20	29	−9	36	Relegation to Ligue Professionnelle 2
15	RC Arbaâ (R)	30	4	7	19	31	55	−24	19	Relegation to Ligue Professionnelle 2
16	ASM Oran (R)	30	5	3	22	21	54	−33	18	Relegation to Ligue Professionnelle 2

Updated to match(es) played on 27 May 2016. Source: DZFoot
Rules for classification: 1) points; 2) head-to-head points; 3) head-to-head goal difference; 4) goal difference; 5) total goals; 6) fairplay ranking; 7) playoff.
(C) Champions; (R) Relegated

=== Result table ===
Home \ Away	ASMO	CRB	CSC	DRBT	ESS	JSK	JSSR	MCA	MCO	MOB	NAH	RCA	RCR	UAL	USB	UEH
ASM Oran		1–3	4–0	0–1	0–2	0–1	0–1	0–0	0–3	1–5	2–1	2–0	2–1	0–2	0–0	1–0
CR Belouizdad	3–1		2–0	3–0	1–0	1–1	2–0	1–0	2–2	1–3	1–1	3–1	3–3	1–2	1–1	1–1
CS Constantine	2–0	2–1		1–0	1–0	0–1	1–1	1–1	2–1	1–0	1–0	1–0	1–1	0–2	1–1	2–0
DRB Tadjenanet	2–1	0–1	1–0		1–0	1–1	0–0	0–0	2–0	1–0	1–1	2–1	2–1	1–2	1–0	0–0
ES Sétif	3–1	1–0	2–1	1–0		2–0	3–0	0–0	1–1	0–0	3–0	1–0	0–0	1–1	0–0	0–1
JS Kabylie	2–0	1–0	0–1	1–1	0–0		2–1	2–1	0–0	1–1	1–0	2–1	1–0	0–1	0–0	4–2
JS Saoura	4–0	0–0	4–1	1–0	1–1	3–0		2–1	0–0	1–0	4–0	1–1	2–0	1–1	2–1	0–0
MC Alger	2–0	0–0	3–0	2–3	2–2	3–1	0–0		1–0	1–0	0–0	3–3	1–0	2–2	0–0	0–0
MC Oran	3–2	3–3	1–1	2–0	1–2	2–0	2–2	0–0		3–3	1–0	2–1	1–1	2–1	0–0	2–0
MO Béjaïa	2–0	1–0	0–0	2–1	0–0	0–0	2–1	2–0	1–0		3–1	2–1	1–1	0–1	1–1	0–0
NA Hussein Dey	1–1	0–3	1–0	2–2	1–0	2–1	2–2	2–1	1–0	0–0		3–0	0–0	2–1	2–0	3–0
RC Arbaâ	2–1	0–0	1–2	2–2	0–3	1–1	0–1	3–1	2–3	0–2	3–1		0–1	1–2	1–1	3–1
RC Relizane	3–1	0–1	2–2	0–3	1–1	1–0	1–0	1–2	1–1	1–0	1–3	3–1		3–0	5–1	1–1
USM Alger	3–0	2–0	1–1	2–1	2–1	2–0	1–2	0–0	3–2	3–2	1–1	4–0	2–2		3–0	2–1
USM Blida	1–0	1–1	0–0	1–1	2–1	0–2	2–1	1–0	2–1	0–0	0–0	1–1	1–0	1–0		0–1
USM El Harrach	1–0	1–1	1–0	1–1	1–0	0–1	1–1	0–1	1–1	2–0	2–0	3–1	1–1	3–0	2–0	

Updated to match(es) played on 23 April 2016. Source: DZFoot
Legend: Blue = home team win; Yellow = draw; Red = away team win.

== Positions by round ==
Team ╲ Round	1	2	3	4	5	6	7	8	9	10	11	12	13	14	15	16	17	18	19	20	21	22	23	24	25	26	27	28	29	30
USM Alger	13	10	5	2	1	2	3	1	1	1	1	1	1	1	1	1	1	1	1	1	1	1	1	1	1	1	1	1	1	1
JS Saoura	7	3	6	7	8	6	9	6	9	9	11	8	9	11	8	10	10	7	6	5	5	3	3	4	3	2	2	4	2	2
JS Kabylie	15	13	15	15	11	12	8	11	7	11	9	11	8	9	11	9	9	10	9	10	12	12	11	10	7	6	3	2	3	3
CR Belouizdad	11	2	1	4	4	1	2	5	8	3	3	4	2	2	2	2	2	2	2	2	2	5	5	5	5	4	4	5	7	4
ES Sétif	6	11	9	8	9	7	10	7	4	7	7	9	7	8	9	7	7	8	11	9	8	10	9	11	9	10	7	6	4	5
MO Béjaïa	1	6	8	6	6	8	6	8	6	6	5	6	5	6	4	3	3	3	3	3	4	2	2	2	2	5	5	7	5	6
DRB Tadjenanet	4	9	3	3	3	4	1	2	2	2	2	2	3	5	6	4	6	6	4	4	3	4	4	3	4	3	6	3	6	7
CS Constantine	2	1	4	5	7	9	7	9	11	12	13	12	14	15	13	13	13	13	12	12	11	11	12	12	12	12	11	12	11	8
USM El Harrach	8	4	2	1	2	5	5	4	5	5	4	3	4	4	5	6	5	5	7	7	7	6	6	9	11	9	9	8	8	9
MC Oran	5	12	13	14	15	15	11	13	14	15	12	13	11	10	7	8	8	9	8	8	10	9	8	7	6	8	8	11	9	10
NA Hussein Dey	3	8	12	13	14	14	15	15	13	8	10	7	10	7	10	12	11	11	10	11	9	8	7	6	8	7	10	9	10	11
MC Alger	12	5	7	9	5	3	4	3	3	4	6	5	6	3	3	5	4	4	5	6	6	7	10	8	10	11	12	10	12	12
RC Relizane	14	15	11	12	13	13	14	12	12	13	14	14	12	13	14	14	14	14	14	14	14	14	14	14	14	14	13	14	13	13
USM Blida	9	14	14	11	10	11	12	10	10	10	8	10	13	12	12	11	12	12	13	13	13	13	13	13	13	13	14	13	14	14
RC Arbaâ	16	16	16	16	16	16	16	16	16	16	16	16	16	16	16	16	16	16	16	16	16	16	16	16	15	15	15	15	15	15
ASM Oran	10	7	10	10	12	10	13	14	15	14	15	15	15	14	15	15	15	15	15	15	15	15	15	15	16	16	16	16	16	16

Leader
2017 CAF Champions League or 2017 CAF Confederation Cup
Relegation to Ligue Professionnelle 2 2016-17

Updated to match(es) played on 27 February 2016. Source: DZfoot.com (in French)

== Clubs season-progress ==
Team ╲ Round	1	2	3	4	5	6	7	8	9	10	11	12	13	14	15	16	17	18	19	20	21	22	23	24	25	26	27	28	29	30
ASM Oran	D	W	L	L	L	W	L	L	L	W	L	L	L	W	L	L	D	W	L	D	L	L	L	L	L	L	L	L	L	L
CR Belouizdad	D	W	W	D	D	W	L	L	L	W	W	D	W	D	W	W	D	D	L	D	L	L	L	W	D	W	D	D	D	W
CS Constantine	W	W	L	D	L	L	W	L	D	L	D	L	D	L	W	L	D	W	W	D	W	L	D	D	W	D	W	L	W	W
DRB Tadjenanet	W	L	W	W	D	D	W	D	D	W	L	W	L	L	L	W	D	D	W	D	D	D	D	W	L	W	L	W	L	L
ES Sétif	D	L	W	D	D	D	D	W	W	L	L	L	W	D	D	W	D	L	D	D	W	L	W	L	W	L	W	W	W	D
JS Kabylie	L	D	L	D	W	D	W	L	W	L	D	D	W	D	L	W	D	L	W	L	D	L	W	W	W	W	W	W	L	D
JS Saoura	D	W	D	D	D	D	L	W	D	D	L	W	L	L	W	D	D	W	W	W	L	W	D	D	W	W	L	D	W	W
MC Alger	D	W	D	L	W	W	L	W	L	D	D	W	D	W	D	L	W	L	D	D	D	D	L	D	L	D	D	W	L	D
MC Oran	D	L	D	L	D	D	W	L	D	D	W	L	W	W	W	L	D	L	W	D	D	W	D	D	W	L	D	L	W	D
MO Béjaïa	W	D	D	D	D	L	W	L	W	D	W	L	W	L	W	W	D	W	L	D	L	W	D	W	D	L	D	L	W	D
NA Hussein Dey	W	L	L	L	D	D	D	D	W	W	L	W	L	W	L	D	D	D	W	L	W	W	D	D	L	W	L	W	L	D
RC Arbaâ	L	L	L	D	D	L	L	L	D	D	W	D	L	L	L	L	D	L	L	D	W	L	W	L	W	L	L	L	L	L
RC Relizane	L	L	W	D	L	D	D	W	D	L	D	L	W	L	D	L	L	W	D	W	D	L	D	W	D	D	W	L	W	D
USM Alger	L	W	W	W	W	W	W	W	D	D	D	W	W	W	W	D	D	W	L	D	W	W	W	L	L	D	W	L	W	L
USM Blida	D	L	L	W	D	D	D	W	D	D	D	D	L	W	L	W	L	D	D	D	L	W	D	D	D	L	D	W	L	W
USM El Harrach	D	W	W	W	D	L	L	W	L	D	W	W	L	D	D	D	W	L	L	D	D	W	L	L	L	W	D	W	D	D

Updated to match(es) played on 27 May 2016. Source: Clubs Season-Progress
W = Win; D = Draw; L = Lose

== Season statistics ==
=== Top scorers ===
R.	Goalscorer	Team	Goals
1	(Libya) Mohamed Zubya	MC Oran	13
1	(Algeria) Mohamed Tiaïba	RC Relizane	13
3	(Algeria) Ahmed Gasmi	NA Hussein Dey	12
4	(Burkina Faso) Banou Diawara	JS Kabylie	11
4	(Ivory Coast) Manucho	RC Relizane	11
6	(Algeria) Moustapha Djallit	JS Saoura	10
6	(Algeria) Mohamed Boulaouidet	JS Kabylie	10
6	(Algeria) Bouazza Feham	CR Belouizdad	10
9	(Algeria) Mohamed Benyahia	MC Oran	9
9	(Senegal) Mohamed Waliou Ndoye	MO Béjaïa	9
9	(Ivory Coast) Ghislain Guessan	RC Arbaâ	9
9	(Algeria) Mohamed Seguer	USM Alger	9
13	(Algeria) Mohamed Meftah	USM Alger	8
13	(Algeria) Hichem Nekkache	CR Belouizdad	8
13	(Algeria) Youcef Chibane	DRB Tadjenanet	8
13	(Algeria) Hamza Zaidi	JS Saoura	8
17	(Algeria) Mohamed Benyettou	ES Sétif	7
17	(Algeria) Amir Sayoud	DRB Tadjenanet	7
17	(Algeria) Rachid Nadji	USM Alger	7
17	(Algeria) Yacine Bezzaz	CS Constantine	7
17	(Algeria) Hadj Bouguèche	USM El Harrach	7
17	(Algeria) Zahir Zerdab	MO Béjaïa	7

Updated to games played on 27 May 2016
Source: soccerway.com

=== Top assists ===
R.	Player	Team	Assists
1	(Algeria) Kamel Larbi	MC Oran	5
1	(Algeria) Bouazza Feham	CR Belouizdad	5
1	(Algeria) Moustapha Djallit	JS Saoura	5
1	(Algeria) Abdenour Belkheir	JS Saoura	5
1	(Algeria) Zinedine Ferhat	USM Alger	5
6	(Algeria) Mohamed Meftah	USM Alger	4
6	(Algeria) Saïd Sayah	JS Saoura	4
6	(Algeria) Tayeb Berramla	RC Relizane; MC Oran	4
6	(Algeria) Hadj Bouguèche	USM El Harrach	4
6	(Algeria) Hacène El Okbi	MC Oran	4
6	(Algeria) Abdeslam Moussi	MC Oran	4

Updated to games played on 13 February 2016

=== Hat-tricks ===
Player	For	Against	Result	Date	Ref
(Algeria) Toufik El-Ghomari	ASM Oran	CS Constantine	4–0	30 October 2015	
(Ivory Coast) Manucho ^{4}	RC Relizane	USM Blida	5–1	28 November 2015	
(Algeria) Moustapha Djallit	JS Saoura	NA Hussein Dey	4–0	12 February 2016	
(Senegal) Mohamed Waliou Ndoye	MO Béjaïa	ASM Oran	5–1	2 April 2016	
(Algeria) Abdelmalek Ziaya	ES Sétif	NA Hussein Dey	3–0	26 April 2016	

Note

^{4} Player scored 4 goals
^{5} Player scored 5 goals

=== Clean sheets ===
R.	Player	Club	Clean sheets
1	(Algeria) Faouzi Chaouchi	MC Alger	16
2	(Algeria) Sofiane Khedairia	ES Sétif	12
3	(Algeria) Farid Chaâl	USM El Harrach	11
4	(Algeria) Azzedine Doukha	JS Kabylie	10
4	(Algeria) El Hadi Fayçal Ouadah	USM Blida	10
4	(Algeria) Chamseddine Rahmani	MO Béjaïa	10
4	(Algeria) Cédric Si Mohamed	CS Constantine	10
8	(Algeria) Houari Djemili	JS Saoura	9
8	(Algeria) Kheireddine Boussouf	NA Hussein Dey	9
10	(Algeria) Abderaouf Natèche	MC Oran	8
11	(Algeria) Malik Asselah	CR Belouizdad	7
11	(Algeria) Mustapha Zaidi	RC Relizane	7
13	(Algeria) Ismaïl Mansouri	USM Alger	6
13	(Algeria) Farès Belalem	DRB Tadjenanet	6
15	(Algeria) Khairi Barki	DRB Tadjenanet	3
15	(Algeria) Abderaouf Belhani	ES Sétif	3
17	(Algeria) Khaled Boukacem	CR Belouizdad	2
17	(Algeria) Lamine Zemmamouche	USM Alger	2
17	(Algeria) Ismail Khalladi	ASM Oran	2
17	(Algeria) Oussama Litim	USM Blida	2
17	(Algeria) Salah Laouti	JS Saoura	2
17	(Algeria) Mohamed Seghir Kara	ASM Oran	2
17	(Algeria) Mourad Berrefane	USM Alger	2
24	(Algeria) Ahmed Fellah	ASM Oran	1
24	(Algeria) Maâmar Nadjib Meddah	RC Relizane	1
24	(Algeria) Moustapha Zeghba	USM El Harrach	1
24	(Algeria) Abderrahmane Boultif	JS Kabylie	1
24	(Algeria) Gaya Merbah	RC Arbaâ	1

^{*} Only goalkeepers who played all 90 minutes of a match are taken into consideration. Updated to games played on 22 May 2016

=== Discipline ===
==== Players ====
As of matches played on 23 May 2016.

Rank	Player	Club	Total		Points
Rank	Player	Club	Yellow card	Red card	Points
1	(France) (Algeria) Rachid Bouhenna	MC Alger	10	1	13
1	(Algeria) Houari Ferhani	RC Arbaâ	10	1	13
3	(France) (Algeria) Toufik Guerabis	CS Constantine	6	2	12
3	(Algeria) Foued Hadded	DRB Tadjenanet	9	1	12
5	(Algeria) Ayoub Azzi	MC Alger	8	1	11
5	(Algeria) Sofiane Bendebka	NA Hussein Dey	8	1	11
5	(Algeria) Djamel Benlamri	ES Sétif	8	1	11
5	(France) (Algeria) Kamel Larbi	MC Oran	8	1	11
9	(Algeria) Elyes Seddiki	NA Hussein Dey	7	1	10
9	(Algeria) Ali Guitoune	DRB Tadjenanet	7	1	10
9	(Algeria) Hamza Heriat	USM Blida	7	1	10
9	(Algeria) Karim Meddahi	RC Relizane	7	1	10

== Media coverage ==
Algerian Ligue Professionnelle 1 Media Coverage
Country	Television Channel	Matches
Algeria	ENTV	4 Matches per round
Qatar	beIN Sports	1 Match per round
Qatar	Al-Kass Sports Channel	Derbies Only

== See also ==
- 2015–16 Algerian Ligue Professionnelle 2
- 2015–16 Algerian Cup
