= 2012–13 USM Alger season =

USM Alger
2012–13 season
- Chairman: Ali Haddad
- Head coach: Miguel Angel Gamondi (until 17 October 2012); Rolland Courbis (from 22 October 2012)
- Stadium: Stade Omar Hammadi
- Ligue 1: 4th
- Algerian Cup: Winners
- UAFA Club Cup: Winners
- CAF Confederation Cup: Second round
- Top goalscorer: League: Ahmed Gasmi (8 goals); All: Noureddine Daham (12 goals)
Home colours	Away colours	Third colours

In the 2012–13 season, USM Alger competed in the Ligue 1 for the 35th time, as well as the Algerian Cup. It was their 18th consecutive season in the top flight of Algerian football.

== Season summary ==
In the 2012–13 season, led by Argentine coach Miguel Angel Gamondi. The start was bad three defeats, two wins and a draw, in the sixth round against ES Setif and after the loss Gamondi was sacked from his post and replaced by former Olympique de Marseille coach Rolland Courbis as their new coach. who gave a good start and the end of the first leg with six wins, two draws and one defeat, in the return stage in the Ligue Professionnelle 1 was not a good start, and it was clear that winning the first Algerian professional league was very difficult, the start of the team focusing on the Algerian Cup and the Arab Club Champions Cup, where it was initially in the Algerian Cup in the semi-final against MC Oran. USMA achieved the most important goal through Noureddine Daham. to reach the team's final for the seventeenth time in history and the first in six years. In the Arab Club Champions Cup it was an easy road but in the semi-final against Ismaily SC, it was a difficult meeting that ended with a penalty shootout for USMA to reach the final for the first time in their history, but in the Confederation Cup, the club did not set it as a major goal and were excluded from the second round after losing against US Bitam.

In the Algerian Cup Final against neighbor MC Alger in the Algiers Derby for the fifth time in history. USM Alger defeated of them with a goal scored by Mokhtar Benmoussa. USMA won its eighth title. Also this was the first time that Al Ittihad won against Mouloudia in the final after four defeats before. After the end of the match and while heading to get the medals, MC Alger refused to go up in protest against the performance of referee Djamel Haimoudi. Two weeks later, USMA won its first Arab Club Champions Cup title after defeating Kuwait's Al-Arabi club 3–2 in aggregate in the 2012–13 UAFA Club Cup final. The match saw the presence of a number of state officials led by Prime Minister Abdelmalek Sellal who handed the cup to the captain Mohamed Rabie Meftah.

== Squad list ==
Players and squad numbers last updated on 21 May 2013.
Note: Flags indicate national team as has been defined under FIFA eligibility rules. Players may hold more than one non-FIFA nationality.

No.	Nat.	Position	Name	Date of birth (age)	Signed from	Apps.	Goals
Goalkeepers
1	(Algeria)	GK	Mohamed Lamine Zemmamouche	19 March 1985 (aged 27)	(Algeria) MC Alger	186	0
16	(Algeria)	GK	Ismaïl Mansouri	7 January 1988 (aged 24)	(Algeria) Reserve team	23	0
29	(Algeria)	GK	Amara Daïf	22 January 1986 (aged 26)	(Algeria) CS Constantine	3	0
Defenders
4	(Algeria)	CB / RB	Abdelkader Laïfaoui	9 July 1981 (aged 31)	(Algeria) ES Sétif	47	4
6	(Algeria)	CB	Farouk Chafaï	23 June 1990 (aged 22)	(Algeria) MC Alger	66	5
20	(Algeria)	CB	Nacereddine Khoualed	16 April 1986 (aged 26)	(Algeria) US Biskra	182	5
24	(Algeria)	RB	Youcef Benamara	24 April 1984 (aged 28)	(Algeria) CA Batna	25	0
26	(Algeria)	LB	Brahim Boudebouda	28 August 1990 (aged 22)	(France) Le Mans FC	33	1
27	(Algeria)	CB	Mohamed Yekhlef	12 January 1981 (aged 31)	(Algeria) ES Sétif	37	0
30	(Algeria)	RB	Mohamed Rabie Meftah	5 May 1985 (aged 27)	(Algeria) JSM Béjaïa	49	5
83	(Algeria)	CB	Ismaël Bouzid	21 July 1983 (aged 29)	(United Arab Emirates) Baniyas SC	9	1
25	(Algeria)	LB / LW	Mokhtar Benmoussa	1 August 1986 (aged 26)	(Algeria) ES Sétif	40	4
-	(Algeria)	CB	Ibrahim Bekakchi	10 January 1992 (aged 20)	(Algeria) Reserve team	6	0
Midfielders
5	(Niger)		Yacouba Ali	6 April 1992 (aged 20)	(Ivory Coast) Africa Sports	6	0
10	(Algeria)		Mohamed Boualem	28 August 1987 (aged 25)	(Algeria) USM El Harrach	18	2
11	(Algeria)		Hocine El Orfi	21 January 1987 (aged 25)	(Algeria) JS Kabylie	23	0
13	(Algeria)		Nassim Bouchema	5 May 1988 (aged 24)	(Algeria) MC Alger (Reserve team)	68	4
14	(Algeria)		Lamouri Djediat	20 January 1981 (aged 31)	(Algeria) ASO Chlef	64	7
15	(Algeria)		Bouazza Feham	11 April 1986 (aged 26)	(Algeria) ES Sétif	65	5
18	(Algeria)		Saad Tedjar	14 January 1986 (aged 26)	(Algeria) JS Kabylie	26	1
23	(Algeria)		Hamza Koudri	15 December 1987 (aged 25)	(Algeria) MC Alger	34	0
47	(Algeria)		Zinedine Ferhat	1 March 1993 (aged 19)	(Algeria) FAF Academy	54	2
Forwards
7	(Algeria)		Salim Hanifi	11 April 1988 (aged 24)	(Algeria) JS Kabylie	15	2
8	(Algeria)		Ahmed Gasmi	22 November 1984 (aged 28)	(Algeria) JSM Béjaïa	35	9
9	(Algeria)		Noureddine Daham	15 November 1977 (aged 35)	(Germany) TuS Koblenz	98	41
12	(Madagascar)		Carolus Andriamatsinoro	6 September 1989 (aged 23)	(Algeria) WA Tlemcen	6	0
22	(Algeria)		Hichem Mokhtari	24 October 1991 (aged 21)	(Algeria) MC Mekhadma	7	1
48	(Algeria)		Mohamed Seguer	19 January 1985 (aged 27)	(Algeria) ASO Chlef	28	4
99	(Algeria)		Abdelmalek Ziaya	23 January 1984 (aged 28)	(Tunisia) CA Bizerte	13	2

== Transfers ==
=== In ===
Date	Pos	Player	From club	Transfer fee	Source
26 May 2012	FW	(Algeria) Ahmed Gasmi	JSM Béjaïa	Free transfer	
26 May 2012	FW	(Algeria) Hichem Mokhtari	MC Mekhadma	Free transfer	
26 May 2012	MF	(Algeria) Hamza Koudri	MC Alger	Free transfer	
28 May 2012	FW	(Madagascar) Carolus Andriamatsinoro	Paradou AC	Free transfer	
28 May 2012	MF	(Algeria) Saad Tedjar	JS Kabylie	Free transfer	
28 May 2012	MF	(Algeria) Hocine El Orfi	JS Kabylie	Free transfer	
28 May 2012	DF	(Algeria) Adel Maïza	JSM Béjaïa	Free transfer	
3 June 2012	DF	(Algeria) Youcef Benamara	CA Batna	Free transfer	
6 June 2012	MF	(Algeria) Mohamed Seguer	ASO Chlef	Free transfer	
12 June 2012	DF	(Algeria) Brahim Boudebouda	(France) Le Mans FC	Free transfer	
16 June 2012	DF	(Algeria) Mokhtar Benmoussa	ES Sétif	Free transfer	
3 July 2012	GK	(Algeria) Amara Daïf	CS Constantine	Free transfer	
3 October 2012	DF	(Algeria) Ismaël Bouzid	(United Arab Emirates) Baniyas Club	Free transfer	
4 January 2013	FW	(Algeria) Abdelmalek Ziaya	(Tunisia) CA Bizertin	Free transfer	
12 January 2013	MF	(Niger) Yacouba Ali	(Ivory Coast) Africa Sports d'Abidjan	Free transfer	
13 January 2013	MF	(Algeria) Salim Hanifi	JS Kabylie	Free transfer	

=== Out ===
Date	Pos	Player	To club	Transfer fee	Source
February 2012	MF	(Mali) Amadou Diamouténé	Unattached	Free transfer (Released)	
3 June 2012	GK	(Algeria) Sid Ahmed Rafik Mazouzi	WA Tlemcen	Loan	
27 June 2012	MF	(Algeria) Mehdi Benaldjia	CR Belouizdad	Loan	
28 June 2012	FW	(Algeria) Farès Hamiti	CR Belouizdad	Free transfer (Released)	
30 June 2012	MF	(Algeria) Salim Boumechra	MC Oran	Free transfer	
30 June 2012	MF	(Algeria) Nouri Ouznadji	USM Blida	Free transfer	
2 July 2012	FW	(Algeria) Mouaouia Meklouche	MC Alger	Loan	
24 July 2012	FW	(Algeria) Saïd Sayah	WA Tlemcen	Loan	
6 August 2012	FW	(Cameroon) Serge N'Gal	(Portugal) Académica de Coimbra	Free transfer (Released)	
21 August 2012	MF	(Algeria) Khaled Lemmouchia	(Tunisia) Club Africain	Free transfer	
9 January 2013	DF	(Mali) Abdoulaye Maïga	(France) Gazélec Ajaccio	Free transfer	
14 January 2013	DF	(Algeria) Adel Maïza	JS Kabylie	Free transfer (Released)	

== Pre-season and friendlies ==
30 July 2012 Friendly	USM Alger	2–0	Paradou AC	(Algiers)
23:00	Benmoussa 37'; Daham 61'			Stadium: Stade Omar Hamadi

2 August 2012 Friendly	USM Alger	3–1	RC Arbaâ	(Algiers)
23:00	Gasmi 12'; Carolus 15'; Djediat 69'			Stadium: Stade Omar Hamadi

7 August 2012 Friendly	USM Alger	1–0	Olympique de Médéa	(Algiers)
23:00	Tedjar 29' (pen.)			Stadium: Stade Omar Hamadi

9 August 2012 Friendly	USM Alger	8–1	NARB Réghaïa	(Algiers)
23:00	Maïza 20' (pen.); Daham 35'; Carolus 46', 61', 81'; Djediat 50', 58'; Meftah 88'			Stadium: Stade Omar Hamadi

16 August 2012 Friendly	USM Alger	6–0	WA Rouiba	(Algiers)
23:00	Benmoussa 8', 49'; Carolus 22'; Tedjar 28'; Boudebouda 37'; Koudri 77'			Stadium: Stade Omar Hamadi

26 August 2012 Friendly	O. Marrakech	2–2	USM Alger	(Casablanca)
18:00 UTC+1			Khoualed 5'; Maïza 8'

28 August 2012 Friendly	Moghreb Tétouan	1–2	USM Alger	(Casablanca)
18:00 UTC+1			Gasmi 13' (pen.); Daham 82'

30 August 2012 Friendly	WA Casablanca	3–2	USM Alger	(Casablanca)
16:30 UTC+1			Daham 7'; Gasmi 55'

1 September 2012 Friendly	RA Casablanca	1–1	USM Alger	(Casablanca)
18:00 UTC+1			Daham 75' (pen.)

6 September 2012 Friendly	USM Alger	5–0	ES Azeffoun	(Algiers)
23:00	Gasmi; Daham; Frioui			Stadium: Stade Omar Hamadi

== Competitions ==
=== Overview ===
Competition	Record								Started round	Final position / round	First match	Last match
Competition	G	W	D	L	GF	GA	GD	Win %	Started round	Final position / round	First match	Last match
Ligue 1	30	15	6	9	32	15	+17	50.00	—N/a	4th	15 September 2012	21 May 2013
Algerian Cup	6	6	0	0	11	1	+10	100.00	Round of 64	Winner	15 December 2012	1 May 2013
Confederation Cup	4	2	1	1	4	5	−1	50.00	First round	Second round	17 March 2013	4 May 2013
UAFA Club Cup	8	5	3	0	16	6	+10	62.50	Second round	Winner	19 October 2012	14 May 2013
Total	48	28	10	10	63	27	+36	58.33				

=== Ligue 1 ===
==== League table ====
Pos	Team	Pld	W	D	L	GF	GA	GD	Pts	Qualification or relegation
2	USM El Harrach (Note: USM El Harrach, the 2012–13 Algerian Ligue Professionnelle 1 runner-up, withdrew after the draw was held. Sporting Praia Cruz, the 2013 São Tomé and Príncipe Championship champion, were allowed by the CAF to replace them in the draw.)	30	17	6	7	38	22	+16	57	Qualification for the Champions League preliminary round
3	CS Constantine	30	13	13	4	37	20	+17	52	Qualification for the Confederation Cup preliminary round
4	USM Alger (Note: USM Alger, the 2012–13 Algerian Cup winner, withdrew before the start of the competition.)	30	15	6	9	32	15	+17	51	Qualification for the Confederation Cup preliminary round
5	MC Alger (Note: In a match between USM El Harrach and MC Alger the last refused to play in the Stade 1er Novembre 1954, but the LFP refused to change the pitch, Despite the presence of USM El Harrach, the referees and supporters, but the Mouloudia team did not attend. the club will receive a penalty, according to Article 84 of the Disciplinary Code of the Algerian Football Federation (FAF), "a match lost by penalty. Defalcation of three (03) points, One million dinars (1,000,000 dinars) fine for the club. "The offending club will be deprived of its compensation due for television rights.)	30	15	8	7	33	24	+9	50	
6	CR Belouizdad	30	11	11	8	32	26	+6	44	

Updated to match(es) played on 21 May 2013. Source: DZFoot
Rules for classification: 1) points; 2) head-to-head points; 3) head-to-head goal difference; 4) goal difference; 5) total goals; 6) fairplay ranking; 7) playoff.

==== Results summary ====
Overall								Home						Away					
Pld	W	D	L	GF	GA	GD	Pts	W	D	L	GF	GA	GD	W	D	L	GF	GA	GD
30	15	6	9	32	15	+17	51	11	3	1	23	2	+21	4	3	8	9	13	−4

Last updated: 21 May 2013.
Source: Competitive matches

==== Results by round ====
Round	1	2	3	4	5	6	7	8	9	10	11	12	13	14	15	16	17	18	19	20	21	22	23	24	25	26	27	28	29	30
Ground	H	A	H	A	H	A	H	A	H	H	A	H	A	H	A	A	H	A	H	A	H	A	H	A	A	H	A	H	A	H
Result	D	L	W	W	L	L	W	D	W	W	W	W	L	W	D	L	W	L	W	D	W	L	D	W	L	D	L	W	W	W
Position	6	10	8	3	9	10	8	10	5	5	4	3	4	3	3	3	3	3	3	4	3	4	4	4	4	5	5	5	5	4

Updated to match(es) played on 21 May 2013. Source: Competitive matches
A = Away; H = Home; W = Win; D = Draw; L = Loss

=== Matches ===
15 September 2012 Round 1	USM Alger	1–1	CS Constantine	Bologhine
18:00	Daham 26'	Soccerway report	27' Boulemdaïs	Stadium: Stade Omar Hamadi; Referee: Mohamed Saïdi

18 September 2012 Round 2	MC El Eulma	3–2	USM Alger	El Eulma
18:00	Chenihi 52'; Tiaïba 60' (pen.); Abbès 85'	Soccerway report	18', 58' Benmoussa	Stadium: Stade Messaoud Zougar; Referee: Mohamed Ghorbal

22 September 2012 Round 3	USM Alger	1–0	MC Alger	Algiers
17:45	Gasmi 67'	Soccerway report		Stadium: Stade 5 Juillet 1962; Referee: Mokhtar Amalou

29 September 2012 Round 4	CA Batna	0–3	USM Alger	Batna
18:00		Soccerway report	Seguer 12'; Gasmi 82'; Feham 90' (pen.)	Stadium: Stade 1er Novembre 1954; Referee: Mohamed Benouza

6 October 2012 Round 5	USM Alger	0–1	CA Bordj Bou Arreridj	Bologhine
18:00		Soccerway report	Chebira 2'	Stadium: Omar Hamadi Stadium; Referee: Mohamed Bachir

16 October 2012 Round 6	ES Sétif	1–0	USM Alger	Sétif
18:00	Karaoui 73'	Soccerway report		Stadium: Stade 8 Mai 1945; Referee: Mehdi Abid Charef

30 October 2012 Round 7	USM Alger	1–0	JS Kabylie	Bologhine
18:00	Chafaï 58'	Soccerway report		Stadium: Omar Hamadi Stadium; Referee: Boubekeur Zouaoui

23 October 2012 Round 8	USM El Harrach	0–0	USM Alger	Algiers
16:00		Soccerway report		Stadium: Stade 1er Novembre 1954; Referee: Sofiane Bousseter

3 November 2012 Round 9	USM Alger	4–0	WA Tlemcen	Bologhine
18:00	Gasmi 17', 52', 64'; Chafaï 35'	Soccerway report		Stadium: Omar Hamadi Stadium; Referee: Said Aouina

10 November 2012 Round 10	USM Alger	3–0	ASO Chlef	Bologhine
18:00	Feham 1'; Seguer 4'; Gasmi 45' (pen.)	Soccerway report		Stadium: Omar Hamadi Stadium; Referee: Mohamed Saïdi

17 November 2012 Round 11	JS Saoura	0–1	USM Alger	Béchar
15:00		Soccerway report	Boudebouda 90'	Stadium: Stade 20 Août 1955; Attendance: 0 (close doors); Referee: Redouane Necib

27 November 2012 Round 12	USM Alger	1–0	MC Oran	Bologhine
18:00	Daham 83'	Soccerway report		Stadium: Omar Hamadi Stadium; Referee: Mehdi Abid Charef

1 December 2012 Round 13	JSM Béjaïa	2–0	USM Alger	Béjaïa
18:00	Megatli 43'; Zerara 90' (pen.)	Soccerway report		Stadium: Stade de l'Unité Maghrébine; Referee: Mohamed Benouza

7 December 2012 Round 14	USM Alger	6–0	USM Bel-Abbès	Bologhine
16:00	Gasmi 35' (pen.); Tedjar 59'; Daham 69', 78'; Bouchema 86'; Djediat 90+2'	Soccerway report		Stadium: Omar Hamadi Stadium; Referee: Rafik Achouri

22 December 2012 Round 15	CR Belouizdad	0–0	USM Alger	Algiers
15:00		Soccerway report		Stadium: Stade 20 Août 1955; Referee: Mokhtar Amalou

15 January 2013 Round 16	CS Constantine	1–0	USM Alger	Constantine
15:00	Hadiouche 5'	Soccerway report		Stadium: Stade Mohamed Hamlaoui; Referee: Farouk Mial

19 January 2013 Round 17	USM Alger	1–0	MC El Eulma	Bologhine
18:00	Meftah 59'	Soccerway report		Stadium: Omar Hamadi Stadium; Referee: Sofiane Bousseter

25 January 2013 Round 18	MC Alger	1–0	USM Alger	Algiers
17:45	Djallit 75'	Soccerway report		Stadium: Stade 5 Juillet 1962; Referee: Merzak Halalchi

2 February 2013 Round 19	USM Alger	2–0	CA Batna	Bologhine
18:00	Betrouni 66'; Gasmi 90'	Soccerway report		Stadium: Omar Hamadi Stadium; Referee: Redouane Necib

8 February 2013 Round 20	CA Bordj Bou Arreridj	1–1	USM Alger	Bordj Bou Arréridj
15:00	Bendahmane 12'	Soccerway report	67' Boudebouda	Stadium: Stade 20 Août 1955; Referee: Mohamed Ghorbal

19 February 2013 Round 21	USM Alger	1–0	ES Sétif	Bologhine
18:00	Ziaya 6' (pen.)	Soccerway report		Stadium: Omar Hamadi Stadium; Referee: Mehdi Abid Charef

23 February 2013 Round 22	JS Kabylie	1–0	USM Alger	Tizi Ouzou
15:00	Belkalem 45'	Soccerway report		Stadium: Stade 1er Novembre 1954; Referee: Rafik Achouri

9 March 2013 Round 23	USM Alger	0–0	USM El Harrach	Bologhine
17:45		Soccerway report		Stadium: Omar Hamadi Stadium; Referee: Mohamed Bichari

22 March 2013 Round 24	WA Tlemcen	0–1	USM Alger	Tlemcen
16:00		Soccerway report	Feham 35'	Stadium: Stade Akid Lotfi; Referee: Farouk Mial

16 April 2013 Round 25	ASO Chlef	1–0	USM Alger	Chlef
18:00	Messaoud 90'	Soccerway report		Stadium: Stade Mohamed Boumezrag; Referee: Mokhtar Amalou

27 April 2013 Round 26	USM Alger	0–0	JS Saoura	Bologhine
18:00		Soccerway report		Stadium: Omar Hamadi Stadium; Referee: Mohamed Bachir

7 May 2013 Round 27	MC Oran	2–0	USM Alger	Oran
17:00	Aouedj 17', 57'	Soccerway report		Stadium: Stade Habib Bouakeul; Referee: Rafik Achouri

11 May 2013 Round 28	USM Alger	1–0	JSM Béjaïa	Bologhine
17:00	Seguer 65'	Soccerway report		Stadium: Omar Hamadi Stadium; Referee: Mohamed Ghorbal

18 May 2013 Round 29	USM Bel-Abbès	0–1	USM Alger	Sidi Bel Abbes
17:00		Soccerway report	Rabti 90+1'	Stadium: Stade 24 Fevrier 1956; Referee: Hakim Bouchama

21 May 2013 Round 30	USM Alger	1–0	CR Belouizdad	Bologhine
17:00	Daham 40'	Soccerway report		Stadium: Omar Hamadi Stadium; Referee: Abderrezzak Arab

=== Algerian Cup ===
15 December 2012 Round of 64	JS Saoura	0–1	USM Alger	Béchar
14:00	Sebie (yellow card) 40'		90+1' Chafaï; (yellow card) 26' El Orfi	Stadium: Stade 20 Août 1955; Referee: Zouaoui, Bitam, Chnaoua

29 December 2012 Round of 32	CC Sig	0–5	USM Alger	Mascara
14:00	Abdallah (yellow card) 20'; Hamada (yellow card) 40' (red card) 55'		26' Daham; 42' (pen.) Bouzid; 62', 72' Djediat; 85'Laïfaoui; (yellow card) 55' Yettou	Stadium: Stade de l'Unité Africaine; Referee: Gherbal, Serradj, Cherchar

5 March 2013 Round of 16	USM El Harrach	0–1	USM Alger	Algiers
16:00	Tatem (yellow card) 30'; Hendou (yellow card) 66'; Azzi (red card) 87'		48' Bouchema	Stadium: Stade 5 Juillet 1962; Referee: Amalou, Bounoua, Azerine

28 March 2013 Quarter-finals	USM Alger	2–1	NA Hussein Dey	Algiers
17:00	Khoualed 34'; Ferhat 85'; Bouchema (yellow card) 17' (red card) 47'; Meftah (yellow card) 66'		(yellow card) 56' Yaya; (yellow card) 65' Boussaid	Stadium: Stade Omar Hamadi; Referee: Zouaoui, Betam, Chenaoua

13 April 2013 Semi-finals	MC Oran	0–1	USM Alger	Oran
17:00	Sebbah (yellow card) 45'; Berradja (yellow card) 55'		18' Daham; (yellow card) 20' Khoualed; (yellow card) 55' Gasmi; (yellow card) 82' Djediat; (yellow card) 90' Ali	Stadium: Stade Ahmed Zabana; Referee: Necib, Boutaghane, Boudebouz

1 May 2013 Final	USM Alger	1–0	MC Alger	Algiers
16:00	Benmoussa 18' (yellow card) 35'; Gasmi (yellow card) 20'; Djediat (yellow card) 44'; Khoualed (yellow card) 60'; Koudri (yellow card) 62'; Bouchema (yellow card) 82'; Zemmamouche (yellow card) 90'		(yellow card) 35' Babouche; (yellow card) 69' Attafen	Stadium: Stade 5 Juillet 1962; Referee: Haïmoudi, Bechirène, Gourari

=== CAF Confederation Cup ===
==== First round ====
17 March 2013 first leg	USM Alger (Algeria)	1–0	(Cameroon) Panthère du Ndé	Algiers, Algeria
18:00 UTC+1	Ziaya 27'			Stadium: Stade Omar Hamadi; Referee: Nasrallah Jawadi (Tunisia)

6 April 2013 Second leg	Panthère du Ndé (Cameroon)	2–3 (2–4 agg.)	(Algeria) USM Alger	Douala, Cameroon
16:00 UTC+1	Fogang 85'; Eya 90+4'		Daham 27'; Feham 67'; Seguer 81'	Stadium: Stade de la Réunification; Referee: Kokou Djaoupé (Togo)

==== Second round ====
19 April 2013 first leg	USM Alger (Algeria)	0–0	(Gabon) US Bitam	Algiers, Algeria
16:30 UTC+1				Stadium: Stade Omar Hamadi; Referee: Denis Batte (Uganda)

4 May 2013 Second leg	US Bitam (Gabon)	3–0 (3–0 agg.)	(Algeria) USM Alger	Bitam, Gabon
19:00 UTC+1	Djissikadié 46'; Yacouya 58'; Massamba 82'			Stadium: Stade Gaston Peyrille; Referee: Hamada Nampiandraza (Madagascar)

=== UAFA Club Cup ===
==== Second round ====
19 October 2012 first leg	ASC Tevragh-Zeïna (Mauritania)	0–2	(Algeria) USM Alger	Nouakchott, Mauritania
16:30		Report	Benmoussa 26'; Daham 42' Zemmamouche, Benamara, Laïfaoui, Chafaï, Boudebouda, El Orfi, Bouchema, Tedjar (substituted off) 75' (Ferhat, (substituted on) 75'), Feham (substituted off) 68' (Djediat, (substituted on) 68'), Benmoussa (substituted off) 83' (Seguer, (substituted on) 83'), Daham	Stadium: Stade Olympique; Referee: Redouane Jiyed (Morocco)

24 November 2012 Second leg	USM Alger (Algeria)	2–1 (4–1 agg.)	(Mauritania) ASC Tevragh-Zeïna	Algiers, Algeria
18:00	Daham 52'; Tedjar 57'	Report		Stadium: Stade Omar Hamadi; Referee: Abdellah Al Achiri (Morocco)

==== Quarter-finals ====
12 February 2013 first leg	Al-Baqa'a SC (Jordan)	1–6	(Algeria) USM Alger	Amman, Jordan
14:00	Al Rifai 40' Ibn Attarif, Abdelkarim, Al Darssia, Sadi Shahin, Deldoum Ibrahim, Ali Yasser, Yasser Akra, Adnane Addous (Acchati 53'), Mohamed Ouail, Mohamed Abdelhalim (Achahda 88')	Report	Djediat 5', 7', 11'; Hanifi 19', 90'; Chafaï 59' Zemmamouche, Benamara, Khoualed (substituted off) 46' (Bouzid, (substituted on) 46'), Chafaï, Benmoussa, Bouchema (substituted off) 46' (Feham, (substituted on) 46'), El Orfi, Ferhat, Djedat, Hanifi, Seguer (substituted off) 84' (Daham, (substituted on) 84')	Stadium: Amman International Stadium; Referee: Ali Shaban (Kuwait)

26 February 2013 Second leg	USM Alger (Algeria)	3–2 (9–3 agg.)	(Jordan) Al-Baqa'a SC	Algiers, Algeria
15:00	Gasmi 14'; Mokhtari 70'; Feham 90+1' Daif, Benamara, Bouzid, Laïfaoui, Boudebouda (substituted off) 75' (Benmoussa, (substituted on) 75'), El Orfi, Feham, Gasmi (substituted off) 68' (Tedjar, (substituted on) 68'), Hanifi, Seguer, Mokhtari	Report	A. Adous 72'; L. Adous 86'	Stadium: Stade Omar Hamadi; Referee: Mohamed Hussein El-Fadil (Sudan)

==== Semifinals ====
12 March 2013 first leg	USM Alger (Algeria)	0–0	(Egypt) Ismaily SC	Algiers, Algeria
16:00	Zemmamouche, Meftah, Boudebouda, Laïfaoui, Khoualed, Koudri, El Orfi, Djediat (Benmoussa), Feham, Gasmi, Daham (Hanifi).	Report	Mohamed Sobhy, Abdelhamid Samy, Sameh Abdelfadil, Mohamed Sherif, Mohab Said, Ahmed Abdelaziz, Ahmed Khairy, Amrou Silia, Mahmoud Abdelaziz, Omar Gamal, Ahmed Ali (John Antwi).	Stadium: Stade Omar Hamadi; Referee: Youssef Essrayri (Tunisia)

2 April 2013 Second leg	Ismaily SC (Egypt)	0–0 (3–4 p)	(Algeria) USM Alger	Cairo, Egypt
17:00		Report	Zemmamouche, Meftah, Khoualed, Chafai, Boudebouda, Koudri, Bouchema, Ferhat (substituted off) 90' (Daham, (substituted on) 90'), Djediat (substituted off) 62' (Tedjar, (substituted on) 62'), Benmoussa, Gasmi (substituted off) 76' (Hanifi, (substituted on) 76')	Stadium: 30 June Stadium; Referee: Abdulrahman Mohamed Abdou (Qatar)
	Penalties
	Khairy (penalty missed); Al-Sulaya (penalty scored); El-Mohamady (penalty missed); Antwi (penalty scored); Metwaly (penalty scored)		(penalty scored) Tedjar; (penalty scored) Bouchema; (penalty scored) Meftah; (penalty missed) Daham; (penalty scored) Benmoussa

==== Final ====
14 April 2013 First leg	Al-Arabi SC (Kuwait)	0–0	(Algeria) USM Alger	Al-Mansouriah, Kuwait
17:00	M.Fall (yellow card) 5'; Al-Rashidi (yellow card) 33'		Daham (yellow card) 12'; Khoualed (yellow card) 54'; Chafaï (yellow card) 81' Zemmamouche, Benmoussa, Chafaï, Laïfaoui, Khoualed, Koudri, Bouchema, Djediat, Tedjar (substituted off) 79' (Benamara, (substituted on) 79'), Daham (substituted off) 70' (Carolus, (substituted on) 70'), Ferhat (substituted off) 90' (Seguer, (substituted on) 90')	Stadium: Sabah Al-Salem Stadium; Attendance: 23,456; Referee: Mohamed Arafa (Jordan)

14 May 2013 Second leg	USM Alger (Algeria)	3–2 (3–2 agg.)	(Kuwait) Al-Arabi SC	Algiers, Algeria
17:30	Daham 13'; Koudri (yellow card) 26' (red card) 42'; Djediat 37' (yellow card) 65'; Bouchema (yellow card) 61'; Meftah 76' (pen.); Ferhat (yellow card) 90'; Boudebouda (yellow card) 90+2' Zemmamouche, Meftah, Chafaï, Laïfaoui, Boudebouda, Koudri, Bouchema, Feham (substituted off) 60' (El Orfi, (substituted on) 60'), Djediat (substituted off) 65' (Carolus, (substituted on) 65'), Benmoussa, Daham (substituted off) 45+2' (Ferhat, (substituted on) 45+2')	Report	K.Fall 58'; Al-Moussawi 61'; Al Rashidi (yellow card) 90'	Stadium: Stade 5 Juillet 1962; Referee: Khalil Al Ghamdi (Saudi Arabia)

== Squad information ==
=== Appearances and goals ===
No.	Pos	Player	Nat	Ligue 1			Algerian Cup			Confederation Cup			UAFA Club Cup			Total		
No.	Pos	Player	Nat	App	St	G	App	St	G	App	St	G	App	St	G	App	St	G
Goalkeepers
1	GK	Lamine Zemmamouche	(Algeria)	22	22	0	6	6	0	0	0	0	6	6	0	34	34	0
16	GK	Ismaïl Mansouri	(Algeria)	8	8	0	0	0	0	2	2	0	1	1	0	11	11	0
29	GK	Amara Daïf	(Algeria)	0	0	0	0	0	0	2	2	0	1	1	0	3	3	0
Defenders
4	DF	Abdelkader Laïfaoui	(Algeria)	9	9	0	3	1	1	4	4	0	6	0	0	22	0	1
6	DF	Farouk Chafaï	(Algeria)	17	17	2	5	5	1	2	2	0	5	0	1	29	0	4
20	DF	Nacereddine Khoualed	(Algeria)	25	25	0	5	5	1	1	1	0	4	0	0	35	0	1
24	DF	Youcef Benamara	(Algeria)	14	10	0	4	3	0	3	3	0	4	0	0	25	0	0
25	DF	Mokhtar Benmoussa	(Algeria)	26	22	2	5	3	1	2	1	0	7	0	1	40	0	4
26	DF	Brahim Boudebouda	(Algeria)	21	16	1	4	2	0	2	2	0	6	0	0	33	0	1
27	DF	Mohamed Yekhlef	(Algeria)	3	2	0	1	1	0	0	0	0	1	0	0	5	3	0
30	DF	Mohamed Rabie Meftah	(Algeria)	16	15	1	3	3	0	1	1	0	4	0	1	24	19	2
83	DF	Ismaël Bouzid	(Algeria)	3	3	0	1	1	1	3	3	0	2	0	0	9	0	1
	DF	Ibrahim Bekakchi	(Algeria)	6	6	0	0	0	0	0	0	0	0	0	0	6	6	0
	DF	Adel Maïza (Note: Player transferred out during the season)	(Algeria)	3	3	0	0	0	0	0	0	0	1	0	0	4	3	0
	DF	Nazim Aklil (Note: Player from USM Alger Reserve)	(Algeria)	1	1	0	0	0	0	0	0	0	–	–	–	1	1	0
	DF	Hussein Boukatouh	(Algeria)	1	1	0	0	0	0	0	0	0	–	–	–	1	1	0
Midfielders
5	MF	Yacouba Ali	(Niger)	5	5	0	1	0	0	0	0	0	0	0	0	6	5	0
11	MF	Hocine El Orfi	(Algeria)	14	8	0	1	1	0	2	2	0	6	0	0	23	0	0
13	MF	Nassim Bouchema	(Algeria)	25	25	1	3	3	1	3	3	0	5	0	0	36	0	2
14	MF	Lamouri Djediat	(Algeria)	21	15	1	5	5	2	2	1	0	7	0	4	35	0	7
15	MF	Bouazza Feham	(Algeria)	22	16	3	6	2	0	3	2	0	6	0	1	37	0	4
18	MF	Saad Tedjar	(Algeria)	16	11	1	3	1	0	2	1	0	5	0	0	26	0	1
23	MF	Hamza Koudri	(Algeria)	23	22	0	6	5	0	0	0	0	5	0	0	34	0	0
47	MF	Zinedine Ferhat	(Algeria)	21	13	1	5	5	1	2	1	0	6	0	0	34	0	2
	MF	Karim Baïteche	(Algeria)	1	0	0	0	0	0	0	0	0	–	–	–	1	0	0
	MF	Rédha Abdelmalek Betrouni	(Algeria)	5	2	1	1	1	0	0	0	0	–	–	–	6	3	1
	MF	Nassim Yettou	(Algeria)	5	3	0	1	1	0	0	0	0	–	–	–	6	4	0
Forwards
	FW	Djamel Eddine Chatal	(Algeria)	3	0	0	0	0	0	0	0	0	–	–	–	3	0	0
	FW	Samy Frioui	(Algeria)	1	0	0	0	0	0	0	0	0	–	–	–	1	0	0
7	FW	Salim Hanifi	(Algeria)	6	1	0	1	0	0	4	4	0	4	0	2	15	0	2
8	FW	Ahmed Gasmi	(Algeria)	24	20	8	5	5	0	3	0	0	3	3	1	35	28	9
9	FW	Noureddine Daham	(Algeria)	14	6	5	4	4	2	2	2	2	7	0	3	27	0	12
12	FW	Carolus Andriamatsinoro	(Madagascar)	3	1	0	1	0	0	0	0	0	2	0	0	6	1	0
22	FW	Hichem Mokhtari	(Algeria)	3	1	0	1	0	0	2	1	0	1	0	1	7	0	1
48	FW	Mohamed Seguer	(Algeria)	18	13	3	1	1	0	4	4	1	5	0	0	28	0	4
99	FW	Abdelmalek Ziaya	(Algeria)	9	8	1	2	2	0	2	2	1	–	–	–	13	12	2
	FW	Djamel Rabti	(Algeria)	3	2	0	0	0	0	0	0	0	–	–	–	3	2	0
Total				30		32	6		11	4		4	8		16	48		63

Last updated: 17 June 2022
Source: soccerway.com

=== Disciplinary record ===
No.	Pos.	Player	Ligue 1			Algerian Cup			Confederation Cup			UAFA Club Cup			Total		
No.	Pos.	Player	Yellow card	(yellow card) (yellow-red card)	Red card	Yellow card	(yellow card) (yellow-red card)	Red card	Yellow card	(yellow card) (yellow-red card)	Red card	Yellow card	(yellow card) (yellow-red card)	Red card	Yellow card	(yellow card) (yellow-red card)	Red card
1	GK	(Algeria) Lamine Zemmamouche	3	0	0	0	0	0	0	0	0	0	0	0	3	0	0
6	DF	(Algeria) Farouk Chafaï	2	0	0	0	0	0	0	0	0	1	0	0	3	0	0
20	DF	(Algeria) Nacereddine Khoualed	4	0	0	2	0	0	1	0	0	2	0	0	9	0	0
24	DF	(Algeria) Youcef Benamara	2	0	0	0	0	0	2	0	0	0	0	0	4	0	0
25	DF	(Algeria) Mokhtar Benmoussa	3	0	1	1	0	0	0	0	0	0	0	0	4	0	1
26	DF	(Algeria) Brahim Boudebouda	1	0	0	0	0	0	1	0	0	2	0	0	4	0	0
27	DF	(Algeria) Mohamed Yekhlef	2	0	0	0	0	0	0	0	0	0	0	0	2	0	0
30	DF	(Algeria) Mohamed Rabie Meftah	5	0	1	1	0	0	0	0	0	1	0	0	7	0	1
83	DF	(Algeria) Ismaël Bouzid	1	0	0	0	0	0	0	0	0	0	0	0	1	0	0
5	MF	(Niger) Yacouba Ali	0	0	0	1	0	0	0	0	0	0	0	0	1	0	0
11	MF	(Algeria) Hocine El Orfi	1	0	0	1	0	0	0	0	0	0	0	0	2	0	0
13	MF	(Algeria) Nassim Bouchema	6	0	0	1	0	1	0	0	0	2	0	0	9	0	1
14	MF	(Algeria) Lamouri Djediat	2	0	0	2	0	0	0	0	0	1	0	0	5	0	0
15	MF	(Algeria) Bouazza Feham	0	0	0	0	0	0	0	0	0	1	0	0	1	0	0
18	MF	(Algeria) Saad Tedjar	2	0	0	0	0	0	0	0	0	1	0	0	3	0	0
23	MF	(Algeria) Hamza Koudri	1	0	1	1	0	0	0	0	0	1	0	1	3	0	2
47	MF	(Algeria) Zinedine Ferhat	1	0	0	0	0	0	0	0	0	1	0	0	2	0	0
	MF	(Algeria) Rédha Abdelmalek Betrouni	1	0	0	0	0	0	0	0	0	0	0	0	1	0	0
	MF	(Algeria) Nassim Yettou	0	0	0	1	0	0	0	0	0	0	0	0	1	0	0
8	FW	(Algeria) Ahmed Gasmi	2	0	0	2	0	0	1	0	0	0	0	0	5	0	0
9	FW	(Algeria) Noureddine Daham	3	0	0	0	0	0	0	0	0	2	0	0	5	0	0
48	FW	(Algeria) Mohamed Seguer	2	0	0	0	0	0	0	0	0	0	0	0	2	0	0
99	FW	(Algeria) Abdelmalek Ziaya	1	1	0	0	0	0	0	0	0	0	0	0	1	1	0
Total			45	1	3	13	0	1	5	0	0	15	0	1	78	1	5

=== Goalscorers ===
Includes all competitive matches. The list is sorted alphabetically by surname when total goals are equal.

No.	Nat.	Player	Pos.	L 1	AC	CC 3	ACL 4	TOTAL
9	(Algeria)	Noureddine Daham	FW	5	2	2	3	12
8	(Algeria)	Ahmed Gasmi	FW	8	0	0	0	9
14	(Algeria)	Lamouri Djediat	MF	1	2	0	4	7
25	(Algeria)	Mokhtar Benmoussa	DF	2	1	0	1	4
6	(Algeria)	Farouk Chafaï	DF	2	1	0	1	4
48	(Algeria)	Mohamed Seguer	FW	3	0	1	0	4
15	(Algeria)	Bouazza Feham	MF	3	0	0	1	4
7	(Algeria)	Salim Hanifi	FW	0	0	0	2	2
18	(Algeria)	Saad Tedjar	MF	1	0	0	1	2
99	(Algeria)	Abdelmalek Ziaya	FW	1	0	1	0	2
26	(Algeria)	Brahim Boudebouda	DF	2	0	0	0	2
30	(Algeria)	Mohamed Rabie Meftah	DF	1	0	0	1	2
-	(Algeria)	Mohamed Reda Betrouni	MF	1	0	0	0	1
-	(Algeria)	Djamel Rabti	FW	1	0	0	0	1
Own Goals				0	0	0	0	0
Totals				32	11	4	16	63

=== Clean sheets ===
Includes all competitive matches.

No.	Nat	Name	L 1	AC	CC 3	ACL 4	Total
1	(Algeria)	Lamine Zemmamouche	14	5	0	4	23
16	(Algeria)	Ismaïl Mansouri	5	0	2	0	7
29	(Algeria)	Amara Daïf	0	0	0	0	0
		TOTALS	19	5	2	4	30
