= USM Alger in African football =

USM Alger in international football
- Club: USM Alger
- Seasons played: 24
- Most appearances: Oussama Benbot 50
- Top scorer: Billel Dziri 16
- First entry: 1982 African Cup Winners' Cup
- Latest entry: 2026–27 CAF Confederation Cup

Titles
- Confederation Cup: 2: 2022–23; 2025–26
- Super Cup: 2: 2023; 2026

USM Alger, an Algerian professional association football club, has gained entry to Confederation of African Football (CAF) competitions on several occasions. They have represented Algeria in the CAF Champions League on seven occasions, the CAF Confederation Cup on seven occasions, the now-defunct African Cup Winners' Cup on five occasions, and the now-defunct CAF Cup once. The club won the CAF Confederation Cup in 2023 and 2026 and also captured the CAF Super Cup in 2023 and 2026.

At the Union of Arab Football Associations (UAFA), they participated several times, representing Algeria in the Arab Champions League on five occasions and in the now-defunct Maghreb Cup Winners Cup on two occasions. The club's greatest achievement in Arab competitions came in 2013 when it won the UAFA Club Cup, securing its first and only Arab title.

== History ==
=== Early years ===
USM Alger is one of Algeria’s most regular participants in Confederation of African Football (CAF) competitions. African qualification for Algerian clubs is determined by their performances in the domestic league (Ligue Professionnelle 1) and the Algerian Cup. USM Alger most often qualified for the CAF Champions League (formerly African Cup of Champions Clubs) by winning the league title, while cup victories also allowed the club to compete in the now-defunct African Cup Winners' Cup and CAF Cup.

The club’s first participation in a CAF competition was in 1982 in the African Cup Winners' Cup and their first ever continental match ended in a 2–0 victory against CARA Brazzaville. During that 1982 campaign, USM Alger reached the quarter-finals, where they were eliminated by Ghanaian club Hearts of Oak. In 1989, USM Alger again reached the quarter-finals of the African Cup Winners’ Cup but withdrew from the tournament after losing the first leg at home against BFV of Madagascar at Omar Hamadi Stadium citing financial difficulties. The club then remained absent from continental competition for eight years, before returning in 1997.

In 1997, USM Alger made their first appearance in the CAF Champions League, starting with a 9–2 aggregate win over CD Travadores from Cape Verde. In the second round, they defeated Udoji United of Nigeria 3–2 on aggregate to qualify for the group stage. Drawn in Group A alongside Raja Casablanca, Primeiro de Agosto, and Orlando Pirates, USM Alger finished second with 11 points, recording three wins, two draws, and one defeat, the only loss being 2–1 away against Primeiro de Agosto. They narrowly missed qualification for the final, losing out on goal difference in favor of Raja Casablanca. The following year, in 1998, USM Alger participated in the Cup Winners' Cup, eliminating Ghapoha Readers of Ghana 2–0 on aggregate in the second round, before being knocked out in the quarter-finals by Primeiro de Agosto 5–1 on aggregate.

In 1999, the club entered the CAF Cup for the first and only time, qualifying past Horoya AC of Guinea on the away goals rule. In the second round, they dominated Al-Ahli Wad Madani of Sudan 7–0 on aggregate, in a tie where Tarek Hadj Adlane scored the first continental hat-trick in the club’s history. Their progress once again ended in the quarter-finals, eliminated by Wydad Casablanca on the away goals rule. USM Alger’s biggest CAF win came in 2004, when they defeated ASFA Yennenga 8–1, the highest margin recorded by the club in African competition. The club’s heaviest defeats include a major aggregate loss to Primeiro de Agosto in 1998, and another 3–0 away defeat to US Bitam of Gabon in 2013.

=== USM Alger's Continental Campaigns (2000–2007): From Promising Runs to Decline ===
USM Alger began participating consistently in various African competitions such as the African Cup Winners' Cup, CAF Cup, CAF Confederation Cup, and the CAF Champions League until 2007, except in 2001. That year, the team was banned from participating in any African competition due to fielding an ineligible player Burkinabé goalkeeper Siaka Coulibaly against JS du Ténéré from Niger in the second leg of the 2000 African Cup Winners' Cup. In the 2002 African Cup Winners' Cup, USMA reached the semi-finals. In the first round, they defeated Gazelle FC from Chad with a 6–1 aggregate score. In the next round, they overcame Mangasport of Gabon with a 3–1 aggregate. In the quarter-finals, they achieved a dominant 11–3 aggregate win over US Transfoot from Madagascar. However, their run ended in the semi-finals against WAC Casablanca, with a 2–2 aggregate score, as the Moroccan side advanced on the away goals rule.

In the 2003 CAF Champions League, USMA first faced Wallidan FC of Gambia and won 3–2 on aggregate. They then played Stade Malien, winning 3–1 on aggregate. The second leg was held in Constantine instead of Algiers due to a CAF imposed sanction following crowd trouble in the 2002 African Cup Winners' Cup semi-final against Wydad. USMA advanced to the group stage and were placed in Group B alongside Espérance of Tunisia, Canon Yaoundé of Cameroon, and Atlético Sport Aviação of Angola. After losing their first two matches 1–0 away and 1–0 at home to Espérance they recovered with three consecutive wins, defeating Canon Yaoundé twice and ASA 2–0, securing a place in the semi-finals. There, they faced Enyimba of Nigeria and were eliminated 2–1 on aggregate.

In the 2004 CAF Champions League, USMA were eliminated in the group stage. They began with a 10–3 aggregate win over ASFA Yennenga of Burkina Faso, with Malian international Mamadou Diallo scoring a hat-trick in the second leg. He finished as the competition’s top scorer with 10 goals. In the next round, they overcame Asante Kotoko of Ghana via a 3–1 penalty shootout after a tied aggregate score, advancing to the group stage, where they were drawn with Espérance, Jeanne d'Arc of Senegal, and Supersport United of South Africa. USMA managed only seven points from two wins, one draw, and three defeats, finishing third and failing to advance.

After that, USMA's continental results began to decline. In the 2005 CAF Champions League, they failed to reach the group stage. They defeated Olympic Azzaweya of Libya 7–0 on aggregate but were eliminated by Egyptian side Al Ahly SC with a 3–2 aggregate loss. Subsequently, they dropped into the 2005 CAF Confederation Cup, where they were knocked out by Tunisia’s AS Marsa in a 5–4 penalty shootout. In the 2006 CAF Confederation Cup, USMA beat Rail Club du Kadiogo of Burkina Faso 2–1 on aggregate in the preliminary round but were eliminated in the first round by ASC Port Autonome of Senegal, 3–2 on aggregate. Their continental performance hit a low in 2007 when they were eliminated in the preliminary round of the CAF Champions League by AS GNN of Niger.

=== The era of Ali Haddad and first CAF Champions League final ===

The usual starting line-up of the 2015 CAF Champions League Final Second leg Runner-up team

In the 2013 CAF Confederation Cup, USM Alger failed to progress beyond the second round. After eliminating their first opponents, they were knocked out by the Gabonese side US Bitam, losing 3–0 on aggregate.

After an eight-year absence from Africa's premier club competition, USM Alger returned to the 2015 CAF Champions League. They began their campaign in the preliminary round against Chadian club Foullah Edifice. USMA won the first leg 3–1, but lost the return leg by the same scoreline. They nevertheless advanced to the next round on the away goals rule.

In the first round, they comfortably eliminated Senegalese side AS Pikine with a 6–2 aggregate victory before defeating Guinean club AS Kaloum 3–2 on aggregate in the second round, securing qualification for the group stage for the first time in eleven years. on aggregate, in the second round against Club Guinea AS Kaloum to qualify on aggregate 3–2

Following the departure of head coach Velud, Miloud Hamdi took charge on an interim basis at the start of the group stage. USM Alger opened their campaign with a 2–1 home victory over ES Sétif before defeating Sudanese club Al Merrikh 2–1 thanks to a goal from Youcef Belaïli. They then completed a home-and-away double over fellow Algerian side MC El Eulma, winning 3–1 on aggregate to secure qualification for the semi-finals with two matches remaining. USMA later defeated ES Sétif 3–0 before concluding the group stage with a narrow 1–0 defeat away to Al Merrikh, finishing top of the group.

In the semi-finals, USM Alger faced Sudanese giants Al-Hilal. In the first leg in Omdurman, the hosts took the lead through Careca, but Aoudia equalised in the 13th minute. Young forward Baïteche then scored the winning goal in the 67th minute to give USMA a valuable 2–1 away victory. The second leg in Algiers ended in a goalless draw, sending USM Alger to their first-ever CAF Champions League final.

In the final, USM Alger met five-time African champions TP Mazembe. Hampered by the absence of several key players due to injuries and suspensions, USMA lost the first leg 2–1 at home, with Seguer scoring a late consolation goal. In the return leg in Lubumbashi, TP Mazembe proved too strong, winning 2–0 to claim the title with a 4–1 aggregate victory, while USM Alger finished runners-up in the competition.

In the CAF Champions League they faced in the first round Rail Club du Kadiogo and won with difficulty in going 2–0 have signed in the last 20 minutes. after that in the second leg were defeated by a single goal was enough to qualify for the group stage but with the end of the game the players, USMA supporters and Algerian journalists were assaulted by RC Kadiogo supporters who stormed pitch to intervene after that the Algerian ambassador in Ouagadougou, who asked local officials to protect the Algerian team until his return to Algeria. two days later, the sports minister of Burkina Faso apologized for what happened to the team.

In the group stage of the CAF Champions League, the team signed in group B with Zamalek, CAPS United from Zimbabwe and Al-Ahli Tripoli of Libya. this is the first time the USMA has played against these clubs in continental competitions and for the first time against a club from Zimbabwe in the same context, the USM Alger Administration decided to receive its competitors in the Stade du 5 Juillet. The first match was against Al-Ahli Tripoli and ended with the victory of the USM Alger lead to three goals recording by Chafaï, Andria and Darfalou. in the second game against CAPS United at National Sports Stadium in Harare USMA narrowly defeated 2–1 in the final minutes. The start of the matches was difficult because of the great heat and the first half ended 1–0 for the hosts However, in the second half the Union was able to modify the result by defender Abdellaoui, the first in his history as a professional player but despite the control of the Union that a mistake in the defense cost the team the goal of the game for CAPS United. Then in the third round against Zamalek, the team returned with a valuable draw, although he was able to win without the goal he received in the last minute after the error of goalkeeper Zemmamouche star of the game. the coach Put said after the end of the games that his team lost the win but the draw is considered positive and hope is still great to reach the quarter-finals.

In the match against Zamalek, USM Alger won 2–0 in a Ramadan event with 40,000 spectators. Bellahcene scored the first goal at the end of the first half and the first with USMA, in the second half and in the final minutes Meziane scored the second goal, the USMA won in a meritorious way and took the lead of Group B with 7 points. the team then went to Tunisia to face Al-Ahli Tripoli search of a positive result and with 5,000 Usmiste supporters who went to the stadium USM Alger achieved a positive result, a 1–1 draw keep them in the lead and in the final round against CAPS United and more than 50,000 spectators, the team needed to win to secure the lead and had a heavy 4–1 lead. then, in the 80th minute, the stadium witnessed a wonderful atmosphere in the stands to celebrate the 80th anniversary of the founding of the team in the presence of former stars in the team they are, Bengana, Mansouri, Abdouche, Mouassi, Lalili, Hadj Adlane, Ghoul, Achiou, Dziri, Rahim, and including former coach Noureddine Saadi, former President Saïd Allik and leaders of Algeria's National Liberation Front during Algerian War of Independence, Saadi Yacef who is in the same time former president of the club. the joy was completed by qualifying for the quarter-finals.

In the quarter-finals against Ferroviário Beira of Mozambique, the team performed very poorly, especially in the return match, where they qualified with difficulty after a draw in the total of the two matches 1-1 and squeezing through on away goals. after that semi-final. against the neighboring WAC Casablanca, it took place in a brotherly atmosphere especially since both were founded in the same year 1937, and despite the tense diplomatic relations between the two countries but the supporters of the two teams were on time. The supporters of Wydad were received in Algeria free tickets to the stadium and the same was done by WAC Casablanca in the second leg match. In the first leg and more than 65,000 supporters, USM Alger played a very modest performance. although the ground was very bad, it was possible to perform better. In the second leg USMA lost 3–1, and despite the fact that Wydad playing with 10 players, but the team was unable to modify the result, To fail to achieve his goal of winning the CAF Champions League for the first time also for the third time Wydad to remove the USM Alger in the continental championships after 1999 and 2002. In the 2019–20 CAF Champions League participation was difficult due to administrative and financial problems, On August 4, 2019, Al-Hayat Petroleum Company decided to pay the cost of travel to Niger in order to play the preliminary round of the CAF Champions League, the same company that wants to buy the majority of the shares of the club. In the group stage meeting against Wydad Casablanca's captain Brahim Nekkach presented a special gift to Mohamed Lamine Zemmamouche, which was a document dating back 77 years, which is a letter that Union Sportive Musulmane Algéroise had addressed to Wydad Casablanca in 1943 inviting him to participate in a friendly tournament in Algeria and confronting him.

=== New owner and first continental title ===
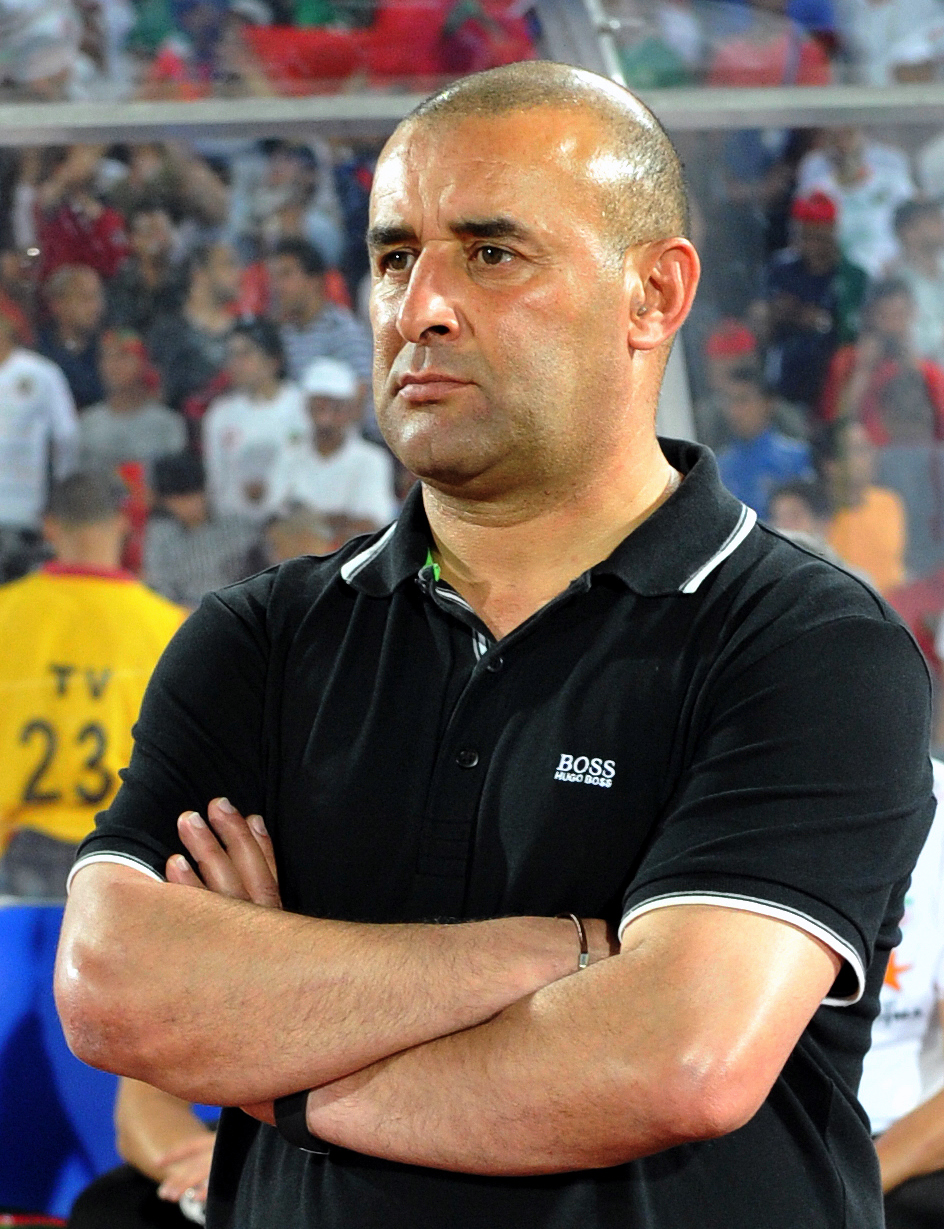
Abdelhak Benchikha leads USM Alger to win the first continental title by winning the 2022–23 CAF Confederation Cup.

On March 3, 2020, after the end of the era of the previous owner Ali Haddad, it was announced that Groupe SERPORT had bought the majority of the club’s shares. Despite the difficult start and the many changes in management and coaches, in the 2022–23 season, With the elimination from the Algerian Cup and the big difference with the Ligue 1 leaders, winning the 2022–23 CAF Confederation Cup became a goal for the team, as stated by chairman of the Board of Directors Sid Ahmed Arab. Before the start of the group stage, Boualem Charef was sacked and replaced with Abdelhak Benchikha who had great experience in Africa. In the quarter-finals in the first leg match against AS FAR, USMA achieved victory with two goals scored by defenders Saâdi Radouani and Zineddine Belaïd. In the return match and after a wonderful reception from the Moroccan team, the beginning of the match was not good as it conceded a goal in the first ten minutes, two minutes after that Radouani equalized the score, in the second half and in the first quarter AS FAR scored the second goal, but substitute Khaled Bousseliou equalized the score in the 78th minute which facilitated USM Alger's mission to qualify for the semi-finals.

In the semi-finals the club moved to Bouaké to play against ASEC Mimosas where it returned by a draw, a week later in the second leg USMA achieved qualification to the final for the first time after winning with two goals, the opener came through Bousseliou in the 28th minute, in the last ten minutes goalkeeper Oussama Benbot after a long pass, Ismail Belkacemi scored the second goal. Benchikha said after the match that it is the time to win the CAF Confederation Cup title for the first time in the history of USM Alger. USM Alger made a big step towards the title by winning 2–1 in Dar es Salaam in the first leg of the Confederation Cup final against Young Africans. It is on a soggy ground that USMA fought a real fight from start to finish, Mahious opened the score in the 32nd minute after a foul from Benzaza, despite everything Young Africans tied in the 81st minute with a beautiful goal scored by Mayele. However less than three minutes later they lead an offensive by Tumisang Orebonye who finds Bousseliou in the area who without panicking will shift Islam Merili who scores the second goal. On June 3, 2023, USM Alger became the first Algerian winners of the CAF Confederation Cup despite losing 1–0 at home in the second leg of the final. As rain that began early in the second half became increasingly heavy the match became increasingly scrappy, USMA pocketed a record two million dollars for winning. On 16 July 2023, Benchikha announced that he would remain in the club despite the offers he had received from clubs outside the country. In the first match of the season in the CAF Super Cup, USM Alger won the title after winning against Al Ahly to win its second continental title.

=== RS Berkane matches crisis ===
During the campaign to defend the CAF Confederation Cup title, USM Alger faced Moroccan club RS Berkane in the semi-final. Three days before the match, RS Berkane club traveled to Algeria. Due to ambiguity regarding the match shirts which show the map of Morocco including Western Sahara. Algeria also broke off diplomatic relations with its Moroccan neighbor because of this issue. Algerian customs asked to see these jerseys and did not allow the delegation to take them. On the day of the match RS Berkane refused to play the match without his jersey. On April 24, 2024, it was announced that the organizing committee of the competition had sanctioned USM Alger by forfeiting it with a 3–0 defeat for the first leg. Despite the lingering crisis due to the first leg, USM Alger traveled to Morocco on April 26. During the technical meeting before the match RS Berkane indicated that she planned to wear the set of jerseys flocked with the map of Morocco with Western Sahara. USM Alger refused to play the match and the officials waited a quarter of an hour before realizing that one of the two teams had not left the locker room. On May 2, Confederation of African Football designated RS Berkane as finalist of the CAF Confederation Cup and declared to transmit the file to the disciplinary committee for possible other sanctions against the Algerian Football Federation.

On May 2, 2024, the Court of Arbitration for Sport announced that it had rejected the request for interim relief to suspend the decision of the CAF appeal jury which validated the use of the RS Berkane jersey, in the absence of a response from the Confederation of African Football. However, the case remains open on the merits and the court is in the process of collecting the elements of each party. On May 10, the Lausanne court once again rejected a request from USM Alger to suspend the Confederation Cup final, pending the conclusion of arbitration proceedings with CAF in the RS Berkane affair. On November 13, 2024, the CAS heard the various parties in the so-called jerseys case, namely USM Alger and FAF on one side and RS Berkane, FRMF and CAF on the other. The Spanish judge investigating the case listened to the arguments of the various parties via the Zoom application, the hearing lasted three hours. In the end, the CAS judge left the case under advisement.

On February 26, 2025 The Court of Arbitration for Sport (CAS) has admitted the appeal of the FAF against the CAF, the FRMF and RS Berkane concerning the validation of the RS Berkane jerseys on which appears a map of Morocco including Western Sahara. The CAS Panel has concluded that RS Berkane jerseys for the 2023–24 CAF Confederation Cup, insofar as they depict a territorial map including an image of a political nature, were contrary to CAF regulations. CAF's decision to maintain the approval of the jerseys is thus annulled and the FAF's appeal is allowed. This decision has no effect on the results of the 2023–24 CAF Confederation Cup. This document is an unofficial summary for the media. With the agreement of the Parties, the CAS award will be published in French on the website in due course.

=== Third continental title ===
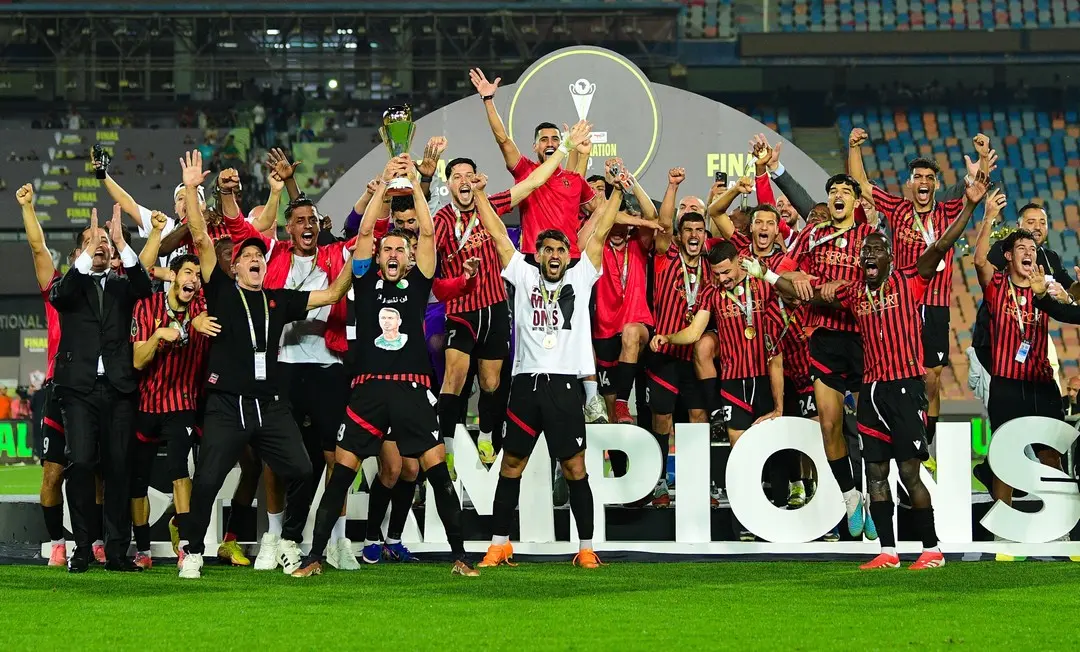
USM Alger are the champions of the 2025–26 CAF Confederation Cup.

USM Alger won the 2026 CAF Confederation Cup final against Zamalek after an extremely tight two-legged contest. In Algiers, USMA secured a 1–0 victory thanks to a stoppage-time penalty converted by Ahmed Khaldi following a VAR intervention. The match was highly competitive, with the Algerian side dominating possession and creating most of the chances, although they struggled to convert their opportunities. In the second leg in Cairo, Zamalek won 1–0 through a penalty, leveling the aggregate score at 1–1 and sending the final to a penalty shootout. During the shootout, both teams remained closely matched, but USM Alger eventually prevailed 8–7 after the Egyptian side missed its eighth attempt. Glody Likonza scored the decisive penalty, while goalkeeper Oussama Benbot played a crucial role with several important saves. This victory gave USM Alger their third continental title and secured qualification for the CAF Super Cup.

On 22 May 2026, following USM Alger’s CAF Confederation Cup triumph, sporting director Saïd Allik spoke on National Radio, where his remarks sparked controversy. Allik criticized the club’s management, holding it responsible for the difficulties encountered in registering players Achref Abada and Imadeddine Azzi with the Confederation of African Football (CAF), which reportedly prevented them from taking part in continental competitions. He described these issues as “serious internal failures” and referred, according to his statements, to a “betrayal from within the club.” In addition, he requested that Groupe SERPORT grant him expanded powers in order to oversee the entire sporting department of USM Alger.

== CAF competitions ==
USM Alger results in CAF competition
Season	Competition	Round	Opposition	Home	Away	Aggregate	Ref.
1982	Cup Winners' Cup	First round	(Republic of the Congo) CARA Brazzaville	2–0	0–1	2–1	
1982	Cup Winners' Cup	Second round	(Nigeria) Bendel Insurance	2–0	1–3	3–3 (a)	
1982	Cup Winners' Cup	Quarterfinals	(Ghana) Hearts of Oak	2–1	0–2	2–3	
1989	Cup Winners' Cup	First round	(Niger) Liberté FC	4–0	0–1	4–1	
1989	Cup Winners' Cup	Second round	(Mali) Stade Malien	1–0	0–1	1–1 (4–3 p)	
1989	Cup Winners' Cup	Quarterfinals	(Madagascar) FC BFV	1–3	Walkover	1–3	
1997	Champions League	First round	(Cape Verde) CD Travadores	6–1	3-1	9–2	
1997	Champions League	Second Round	(Nigeria) Udoji United	3–0	0–2	3–2	
1997	Champions League	Group stage	(Morocco) Raja Casablanca	2–2	2–0	2nd place	
1997	Champions League	Group stage	(South Africa) Orlando Pirates	2–1	1–1	2nd place	
1997	Champions League	Group stage	(Angola) Primeiro de Agosto	1–0	1–2	2nd place	
1998	Cup Winners' Cup	First round	(The Gambia) Hawks	Walkover			
1998	Cup Winners' Cup	Second Round	(Ghana) Ghapoha Readers	1–0	1–0	2–0	
1998	Cup Winners' Cup	Quarter-finals	(Angola) Primeiro de Agosto	1–2	0–3	1–5	
1999	CAF Cup	First round	(Guinea) Horoya AC	2–1	3–2	4–4 (a)	
1999	CAF Cup	Second round	(Sudan) Al-Ahli SC	5–0	2–0	7–0	
1999	CAF Cup	Quarter-finals	(Morocco) Wydad Casablanca	2–1	0–1	2–2 (a)	
2000	Cup Winners' Cup	First round	(Niger) JS du Ténéré	1–0	1–1	2–1 (d)	
2002	Cup Winners' Cup	First round	(Chad) Gazelle FC	6–1	0–0	6–1	
2002	Cup Winners' Cup	Second Round	(Gabon) AS Mangasport	1–0	2–1	3–1	
2002	Cup Winners' Cup	Quarter-finals	(Madagascar) US Transfoot	8–2	3–1	11–3	
2002	Cup Winners' Cup	Semi-finals	(Morocco) WAC Casablanca	2-2	0–0	2–2 (a)	
2003	Champions League	First round	(The Gambia) Wallidan FC	2–0	1–2	3–2	
2003	Champions League	Second Round	(Mali) Stade Malien	2–0	1-1	3–1	
2003	Champions League	Group stage	(Angola) Atlético Sport Aviação	2–0	0–1	2nd place	
2003	Champions League	Group stage	(Tunisia) Espérance	0–1	0–2	2nd place	
2003	Champions League	Group stage	(Cameroon) Canon Yaoundé	3–0	2–0	2nd place	
2003	Champions League	Semifinals	(Nigeria) Enyimba	1–1	1–2	2–3	
2004	Champions League	First round	(Burkina Faso) ASFA Yennenga	8–1	2–2	10–3	
2004	Champions League	Second Round	(Ghana) Asante Kotoko	2–0	0–2	2–2 (3–1 p)	
2004	Champions League	Group stage	(Senegal) ASC Jeanne d'Arc	1–1	1–2	3rd place	
2004	Champions League	Group stage	(South Africa) Supersport United	2–1	0–2	3rd place	
2004	Champions League	Group stage	(Tunisia) Espérance	3–0	1–2	3rd place	
2005	Champions League	First Round	(Libya) Olympic Azzaweya	5–0	2–0	7–0	
2005	Champions League	Second round	(Egypt) Al Ahly	0–1	2–2	2–3	
2005	Confederation Cup	Second Round of 16	(Tunisia) AS Marsa	1–1	1–1	2–2 (4-5 p)	
2006	Champions League	Preliminary Round	(Burkina Faso) RC Kadiogo	1–0	1–1	2–1	
2006	Champions League	First round	(Senegal) ASC Port Autonome	3–2	1–2	4–4 (a)	
2007	Champions League	Preliminary round	(Niger) AS-FNIS	3–1	0–2	3–3 (a)	
2013	Confederation Cup	First round	(Cameroon) Panthère du Ndé	1–0	3–2	4–2	
2013	Confederation Cup	Second round	(Gabon) US Bitam	0–0	0–3	0–3	
2015	Champions League	Preliminary round	(Chad) Foullah Edifice	3–0	1–3	4–3	
2015	Champions League	First round	(Senegal) AS Pikine	5–1	1–1	6–2	
2015	Champions League	Second round	(Guinea) AS Kaloum	2–1	1–1	3–2	
2015	Champions League	Group stage	(Algeria) ES Sétif	3–0	2–1	1st place	
2015	Champions League	Group stage	(Sudan) Al-Merrikh SC	1–0	0–1	1st place	
2015	Champions League	Group stage	(Algeria) MC El Eulma	2–1	1–0	1st place	
2015	Champions League	Semifinals	(Sudan) Al-Hilal	0–0	2–1	2–1	
2015	Champions League	Final	(Democratic Republic of the Congo) TP Mazembe	1–2	0–2	1–4	
2017	Champions League	First round	(Burkina Faso) RC Kadiogo	2–0	0–1	2–1	
2017	Champions League	Group stage	(Libya) Al-Ahli Tripoli	3–0	1–1	1st place	
2017	Champions League	Group stage	(Zimbabwe) CAPS United	4–1	1–2	1st place	
2017	Champions League	Group stage	(Egypt) Zamalek	2–0	1–1	1st place	
2017	Champions League	Quarter-finals	(Mozambique) Ferroviário Beira	0–0	1–1	1–1 (a)	
2017	Champions League	Semifinals	(Morocco) Wydad Casablanca	0–0	1–3	1–3	
2018	Confederation Cup	First round	(Democratic Republic of the Congo) AS Maniema Union	1–1	2–2	3–3 (a)	
2018	Confederation Cup	Play-off round	(Nigeria) Plateau United	4–0	1–2	5–2	
2018	Confederation Cup	Group stage	(Tanzania) Young Africans	4–0	1–2	1st place	
2018	Confederation Cup	Group stage	(Kenya) Gor Mahia	2–1	0–0	1st place	
2018	Confederation Cup	Group stage	(Rwanda) Rayon Sports	1–1	2–1	1st place	
2018	Confederation Cup	Quarter-finals	(Egypt) Al-Masry	0–1	0–1	0–2	
2019–20	Champions League	Preliminary round	(Niger) AS Sonidep	3–1	2–1	5–2	
2019–20	Champions League	First round	(Kenya) Gor Mahia	4–1	2–0	6–1	
2019–20	Champions League	Group stage	(Morocco) Wydad Casablanca	1–1	1–3	4th place	
2019–20	Champions League	Group stage	(Angola) Petro de Luanda	2–2	1–1	4th place	
2019–20	Champions League	Group stage	(South Africa) Mamelodi Sundowns	0–1	1–2	4th place	
2022–23	Confederation Cup	Second round	(Togo) ASC Kara	2–1	2–0	4–1	
2022–23	Confederation Cup	Play-off round	(South Africa) Cape Town City	1–0	0–0	1–0	
2022–23	Confederation Cup	Group stage	(Democratic Republic of the Congo) Saint-Éloi Lupopo	3–0	1–1	2nd place	
2022–23	Confederation Cup	Group stage	(Libya) Al Akhdar	4–1	1–1	2nd place	
2022–23	Confederation Cup	Group stage	(South Africa) Marumo Gallants	2–0	0–2	2nd place	
2022–23	Confederation Cup	Quarter-finals	(Morocco) ASFAR	2–0	2–3	4–3	
2022–23	Confederation Cup	Semi-finals	(Ivory Coast) ASEC Mimosas	2–0	0–0	2–0	
2022–23	Confederation Cup	Final	(Tanzania) Young Africans	0–1	2–1	2–2 (a)	
2023	CAF Super Cup	Final	(Egypt) Al Ahly	1–0 (N)			
2023–24	Confederation Cup	Second round	(Morocco) FUS Rabat	0–0	1–1	1–1 (a)	
2023–24	Confederation Cup	Group stage	(Libya) Al Hilal Benghazi	2–0	1–2	1st place	
2023–24	Confederation Cup	Group stage	(South Africa) SuperSport United	2–1	2–0	1st place	
2023–24	Confederation Cup	Group stage	(Egypt) Future	1–0	0–0	1st place	
2023–24	Confederation Cup	Quarter-finals	(Nigeria) Rivers United	2–0	0–1	2–1	
2023–24	Confederation Cup	Semi-finals	(Morocco) RS Berkane	0–3 (awd.) (Note: Upon arriving to Algeria, RS Berkane official kits were seized by Algerian authorities, who refused to allow them to wear it in the match against USM Alger, due to the shirts featuring a map of Morocco that includes Western Sahara, which is a disputed territory that Morocco claims to be part of their land, while Algeria recognize it as part of the Sahrawi Arab Democratic Republic. The match was cancelled as a result, and RS Berkane were awarded a 3–0 walkover win on 24 April 2024.)	0–3 (awd.) (Note: RS Berkane won on walkover after USM Alger withdrew from the match, despite arriving to the stadium. The match was cancelled as a result, and RS Berkane were awarded a 3–0 win on 1 May 2024.)	0–6	
2024–25	Confederation Cup	Second round	(Tunisia) Stade Tunisien	2–0	0–1	2–1	
2024–25	Confederation Cup	Group stage	(Botswana) Orapa United	6–0	2–1	1st place	
2024–25	Confederation Cup	Group stage	(Senegal) ASC Jaraaf	2–0	0–0	1st place	
2024–25	Confederation Cup	Group stage	(Ivory Coast) ASEC Mimosas	3–0	1–1	1st place	
2024–25	Confederation Cup	Quarter-finals	(Algeria) CS Constantine	1–1	1–1	2–2 (3-4 p)	
2025–26	Confederation Cup	Second round	(Ivory Coast) AFAD Djékanou	3–0	0–1	3–1	
2025–26	Confederation Cup	Group stage	(Ivory Coast) San Pédro	3–2	3–2	1st place	
2025–26	Confederation Cup	Group stage	(Morocco) Olympic Safi	0–0	1–0	1st place	
2025–26	Confederation Cup	Group stage	(Mali) Djoliba	2–0	0–0	1st place	
2025–26	Confederation Cup	Quarter-finals	(Democratic Republic of the Congo) Maniema Union	1–0	1–2	2–2 (a)	
2025–26	Confederation Cup	Semi-finals	(Morocco) Olympic Safi	0–0	1–1	1–1 (a)	
2025–26	Confederation Cup	Final	(Egypt) Zamalek	1–0	0–1	1–1 (8–7 p)	
2026	CAF Super Cup	Final	(South Africa) Mamelodi Sundowns	3–1 (A)			
2026–27	Confederation Cup	Second round	(Equatorial Guinea) The Panthers	Walkover (Note: USM Alger qualified for the group stage of the CAF Confederation Cup following the withdrawal of The Panthers. The Equatorial Guinean club withdrew from the competition due to financial difficulties linked to the lack of an approved stadium in its country. The CAF cancelled the two-legged tie, allowing USM Alger to advance directly to the group stage.)			
2026–27	Confederation Cup	Group stage	(Mali) Real Bamako	–	–		
2026–27	Confederation Cup	Group stage	(Mozambique) Black Bulls	–	–		
2026–27	Confederation Cup	Group stage	(Tunisia) CS Sfaxien	–	–		

== Non-CAF competitions ==
Non-CAF competition record
Season	Competition	Round	Opposition	Home	Away	Aggregate	Ref.
1969	Maghreb Cup Winners Cup	Semifinals	(Libya) Al-Hilal SC	2–1			
1969	Maghreb Cup Winners Cup	Final	(Morocco) RS Settat	0–1			
1970	Maghreb Cup Winners Cup	Semifinals	(Tunisia) Club Africain	0–1			
1970	Maghreb Cup Winners Cup	third Place	(Morocco) Wydad Casablanca	1–3			
2003	Arab Champions League	Group stage	(Egypt) Zamalek SC	1–1		3rd place	
2003	Arab Champions League	Group stage	(Iraq) Al Shorta SC	1–1		3rd place	
2003	Arab Champions League	Group stage	Kuwait SC	1–1		3rd place	
2003	Arab Champions League	Group stage	(Syria) Al-Jaish SC	4–1		3rd place	
2007–08	Arab Champions League	Round 32	(Iraq) Al-Talaba	2–0	2–0	4–0	
2007–08	Arab Champions League	Round 16	(Kuwait) Al-Arabi	Walkover	2–3	Disqualified (Note: Al-Arabi Disqualified, Kuwait have been indefinitely suspended from international football competitions.)	
2007–08	Arab Champions League	Group stage	(Morocco) Wydad Casablanca	2–1	3–2	3rd place	
2007–08	Arab Champions League	Group stage	(Egypt) Tala'ea El-Gaish SC	0–1	0–0	3rd place	
2007–08	Arab Champions League	Group stage	(Syria) Taliya SC	0–1	0–0	3rd place	
2008–09	Arab Champions League	Round 32	(Saudi Arabia) Al-Wahda Mecca	3–0	1–3	4–3	
2008–09	Arab Champions League	Round 16	(Egypt) Ismaily SC	1–4	1–3	2–7	
2012–13	UAFA Club Cup	Second Round	(Mauritania) ASC Tevragh-Zeïna	2–1	2–0	4–1	
2012–13	UAFA Club Cup	Quarter-finals	(Jordan) Al-Baqa'a SC	3–2	6–1	9–3	
2012–13	UAFA Club Cup	Semifinals	(Egypt) Ismaily SC	0–0	0–0	0–0 (4–3 p)	
2012–13	UAFA Club Cup	Final	(Kuwait) Al-Arabi	3–2	0–0	3–2	
2018–19	UAFA Club Championship	First Round	(Iraq) Al-Quwa Al-Jawiya	2–0	1–0	3–0	
2018–19	UAFA Club Championship	Second Round	(Sudan) Al-Merrikh	2–0	1–4	3–4	

== Statistics ==
=== By season ===
Information correct as of 9 November 2026.
Key

- Pld = Played
- W = Games won
- D = Games drawn
- L = Games lost
- F = Goals for
- A = Goals against
- Grp = Group stage
- PR = Preliminary round
- R1 = First round
- R2 = Second round
- PR = Play-off round
- R16 = Round of 16
- QF = Quarter-final
- SF = Semi-final

Key to colours and symbols:

W	Winners
RU	Runners-up

==== In Africa ====
USM Alger record in African football by season
Season	Competition	Pld	W	D	L	GF	GA	GD	Round
1982	African Cup Winners' Cup	6	3	0	3	7	7	0	QF
1989	African Cup Winners' Cup	5	2	0	3	6	5	+1	QF
1997	CAF Champions League	10	6	2	2	21	10	+11	Grp
1998	African Cup Winners' Cup	4	2	0	2	3	5	−2	QF
1999	CAF Cup	6	4	0	2	13	6	+7	QF
2000	African Cup Winners' Cup	2	1	1	0	2	1	+1	R1
2002	African Cup Winners' Cup	8	5	3	0	22	7	+15	SF
2003	CAF Champions League	12	5	2	5	15	10	+5	SF
2004	CAF Champions League	10	4	2	4	20	13	+7	Grp
2005	CAF Champions League	4	2	1	1	9	3	+6	R2
2005	CAF Confederation Cup	2	0	2	0	2	2	0	PR
2006	CAF Champions League	4	2	1	1	6	5	+1	R1
2007	CAF Champions League	2	1	0	1	3	3	0	PR
2013	CAF Confederation Cup	4	2	1	1	4	5	−1	R2
2015	CAF Champions League	16	9	3	4	25	15	+10	RU
2017	CAF Champions League	12	4	5	3	16	10	+6	SF
2018	CAF Confederation Cup	12	4	4	4	18	12	+6	QF
2019–20	CAF Champions League	10	4	3	3	17	13	+4	Grp
2022–23	CAF Confederation Cup	16	9	4	3	24	11	+13	W
2023	CAF Super Cup	1	1	0	0	1	0	+1	W
2023–24	CAF Confederation Cup (Note: In the 2023–24 CAF Confederation Cup semi-final match between USM Alger and RS Berkane was not played. The Confederation of African Football (CAF) announced that RS Berkane won the first and second legs 3–0.)	12	5	3	4	11	11	+0	SF
2024–25	CAF Confederation Cup	10	5	4	1	18	5	+13	QF
2025–26	CAF Confederation Cup	14	7	4	3	16	9	+7	W
2026	CAF Super Cup	1	1	0	0	3	1	+2	W
2026–27	CAF Confederation Cup								
Total		183	88	45	50	282	169	+113	

==== Non-CAF competitions ====
USM Alger record in Arab football by season
Season	Competition	Pld	W	D	L	GF	GA	GD	Round
1969	Maghreb Cup Winners Cup	2	1	0	1	2	2	+0	RU
1970	Maghreb Cup Winners Cup	2	0	0	2	1	4	−3	SF
2003	Arab Unified Club Championship	4	1	3	0	7	4	+3	Grp
2007–08	Arab Champions League	9	4	2	3	11	8	+3	Grp
2008–09	Arab Champions League	4	1	0	3	6	10	−4	R16
2012–13	UAFA Club Cup	8	5	3	0	16	6	+10	W
2018–19	UAFA Club Championship	4	3	0	1	6	4	+2	R2
Total		33	15	8	10	49	38	+11	

=== Overall record ===
==== In Africa ====
As of 9 November 2026:

CAF competitions
Competition	Seasons	Played	Won	Drawn	Lost	Goals For	Goals Against	Last season played	Best performance
Champions League	9	80	37	19	24	132	82	2019–20	Finalist
CAF Confederation Cup	7	70	32	22	16	93	55	2025–26	Winner 2023, 2026
CAF Super Cup	2	2	2	0	0	4	1	2026	Winner 2023, 2026
CAF Cup Winners' Cup (defunct)	5	25	13	4	8	40	25	2002	Semifinals
CAF Cup (defunct)	1	6	4	0	2	13	6	1999	Quarterfinals
Total	24	183	88	45	50	282	169		☆ ☆ ☆ ☆

==== Non-CAF competitions ====
As of 10 December 2018:

Non-CAF competitions
Competition	Seasons	Played	Won	Drawn	Lost	Goals For	Goals Against	Last season played	Best performance
Arab Champions League	5	29	14	8	7	46	34	2018–19	Winner 2013
Maghreb Cup Winners Cup (defunct)	2	4	1	0	3	3	6	1970	Finalist
Total	7	33	15	8	10	49	38		☆

=== Finals ===
Matches won after regular time (90 minutes of play), extra-time (aet) or a penalty shootout (p) are highlighted in green, while losses are highlighted in red.

==== CAF Champions League ====
31 October 2015 (1L)	USM Alger (Algeria)	1–2	(Democratic Republic of the Congo) TP Mazembe	Algiers, Algeria
20:30 UTC+1	Seguer 88'	Report	Kalaba 27'; Samatta 79' (pen.)	Stadium: Stade Omar Hamadi; Referee: Gehad Grisha (Egypt)

8 November 2015 (2L)	TP Mazembe (Democratic Republic of the Congo)	2–0 (4–1 agg.)	(Algeria) USM Alger	Lubumbashi, DR Congo
15:30 UTC+2	Samatta 74' (pen.); Assalé 90+3'	Report		Stadium: Stade TP Mazembe; Referee: Bakary Gassama (Gambia)

==== CAF Confederation Cup ====
28 May 2023 (1L)	Young Africans (Tanzania)	1–2	(Algeria) USM Alger	Dar es Salaam, Tanzania
16:00 UTC+3	Mayele 82'	Report	Mahious 32'; Merili 84'	Stadium: National Stadium; Referee: Jean-Jacques Ndala (DR Congo)

3 June 2023 (2L)	USM Alger (Algeria)	0–1 (2–2 agg.)	(Tanzania) Young Africans	Algiers, Algeria
20:00 UTC+1		Report	Shabani 7'	Stadium: Stade du 5 Juillet; Referee: Dahane Beida (Mauritania)

9 May 2026 (1L)	USM Alger (Algeria)	1–0	(Egypt) Zamalek	Algiers, Algeria
20:00 UTC+1	Khaldi 90+8' (pen.)	Report		Stadium: Stade du 5 Juillet; Referee: Dahane Beida (Mauritania)

16 May 2026 (2L)	Zamalek (Egypt)	1–0 (1–1 agg.) (7–8 p)	(Algeria) USM Alger	Cairo, Egypt
: UTC+2		Report		Stadium: Cairo International Stadium; Referee: Pierre Atcho (Gabon)
	Penalties
	El Said (penalty scored); Abdel Rahim (penalty scored); Abdelmaguid (penalty scored); Mansi (penalty scored); Jaziri (penalty scored); Alvina (penalty scored); El Sayed (penalty scored); Shehata (penalty missed)		Draoui (penalty scored); Khaldi (penalty scored); Radouani (penalty scored); Benayad (penalty scored); Loucif (penalty scored); Chetti (penalty scored); Dehiri (penalty scored); Likonza (penalty scored)

==== CAF Super Cup ====
15 September 2023 2023	Al Ahly (Egypt)	0–1	(Algeria) USM Alger	Taif, Saudi Arabia
21:00 UTC+3		Report	Belaïd 43' (pen.)	Stadium: King Fahd Stadium; Attendance: 10,000; Referee: Pierre Atcho (Gabon)

8 November 2026 2026	Mamelodi Sundowns (South Africa)	1–3	(Algeria) USM Alger	Pretoria, South Africa
15:00 UTC+2	Rayners 25' (pen.)		Zakaria Draoui 5'; Saâdi Radouani 37'; Ahmed Khaldi 55'	Stadium: Loftus Versfeld Stadium; Attendance: 10,000; Referee: Dahane Beida (Mauritania)

==== UAFA Club Cup ====
14 April 2013 (1L)	Al-Arabi SC (Kuwait)	0–0	(Algeria) USM Alger	Al-Mansouriah, Kuwait
19:00 UTC+3		Report		Stadium: Sabah Al-Salem Stadium; Attendance: 23,456; Referee: Mohamed Arafa (Jordan)

14 May 2013 (2L)	USM Alger (Algeria)	3–2 (3–2 agg.)	(Kuwait) Al-Arabi SC	Algiers, Algeria
16:00 UTC+1	Daham 13'; Djediat 37'; Meftah 76' (pen.)	Report	K.Fall 58'; Al-Moussawi 61'	Stadium: Stade 5 Juillet 1962; Attendance: 50,000; Referee: Khalil Al Ghamdi (Saudi Arabia)

== Statistics by country ==
Statistics correct as of game against Sundowns on November 8, 2026

=== CAF competitions ===
Country	Club	P	W	D	L	GF	GA	GD
Algeria	ES Sétif	2	2	0	0	5	1	+4
Algeria	MC El Eulma	2	2	0	0	3	1	+2
Algeria	CS Constantine	2	0	2	0	2	2	+0
Subtotal		6	4	2	0	10	4	+6
Angola	Primeiro de Agosto	4	1	0	3	3	7	−4
Angola	Atlético Sport Aviação	2	1	0	1	2	1	+1
Angola	Petro de Luanda	2	0	2	0	3	3	0
Subtotal		8	2	2	4	8	11	−3
Burkina Faso	ASFA Yennenga	2	1	1	0	10	3	+7
Burkina Faso	RC Kadiogo	4	2	1	1	4	2	+2
Subtotal		6	3	2	1	14	5	+9
Botswana	Orapa United	2	2	0	0	6	0	+6
Subtotal		2	2	0	0	8	1	+7
Cameroon	Canon Yaoundé	2	2	0	0	5	0	+5
Cameroon	Panthère du Ndé	2	2	0	0	4	2	+2
Subtotal		4	4	0	0	9	2	+7
Cape Verde	CD Travadores	2	2	0	0	9	2	+7
Subtotal		2	2	0	0	9	2	+7
Chad	Gazelle FC	2	1	1	0	6	1	+5
Chad	Foullah Edifice	2	1	0	1	4	3	+1
Subtotal		4	2	1	1	10	4	+6
(Democratic Republic of the Congo) DR Congo	TP Mazembe	2	0	0	2	1	4	−3
(Democratic Republic of the Congo) DR Congo	AS Maniema Union	4	1	2	1	5	5	+0
(Democratic Republic of the Congo) DR Congo	Saint-Éloi Lupopo	2	1	1	0	4	1	+3
Subtotal		8	2	3	3	10	10	+0
(Republic of the Congo) Congo	CARA Brazzaville	2	1	0	1	2	1	+1
Subtotal		2	1	0	1	2	1	+1
Egypt	Al Ahly	3	1	1	1	3	3	+0
Egypt	Al-Masry	2	0	0	2	0	2	−2
Egypt	Zamalek	4	2	1	1	4	2	+2
Egypt	Future	2	1	1	0	1	0	+1
Subtotal		11	4	3	4	8	7	+1
Gabon	AS Mangasport	2	2	0	0	3	1	+2
Gabon	US Bitam	2	0	1	1	0	3	−3
Subtotal		4	2	1	1	3	4	−1
(The Gambia) Gambia	Wallidan FC	2	1	0	1	3	2	+1
Subtotal		2	1	0	1	3	2	+1
Ghana	Asante Kotoko	2	1	0	1	2	2	0
Ghana	Ghapoha Readers	2	2	0	0	2	0	+2
Ghana	Hearts of Oak	2	1	0	1	2	3	-1
Subtotal		6	4	0	2	6	5	+1
Guinea	Horoya AC	2	1	0	1	4	4	0
Guinea	AS Kaloum	2	1	1	0	3	2	+1
Subtotal		4	2	1	1	7	6	+1
Ivory Coast	ASEC Mimosas	4	2	2	0	6	1	+5
Ivory Coast	AFAD Djékanou	2	1	0	1	3	1	+2
Ivory Coast	San Pédro	2	2	0	0	6	4	+2
Subtotal		8	5	2	1	15	6	+9
Kenya	Gor Mahia	4	3	1	0	8	2	+6
Subtotal		4	3	1	0	8	2	+6
Libya	Olympic Azzaweya	2	2	0	0	7	0	+7
Libya	Al-Ahli Tripoli	2	1	1	0	4	1	+3
Libya	Al Akhdar	2	1	1	0	5	2	+3
Libya	Al Hilal Benghazi	2	1	0	1	3	2	+1
Subtotal		8	5	2	1	19	5	+14
Madagascar	US Transfoot	2	2	0	0	11	3	+8
Madagascar	FC BFV	1	0	0	1	1	3	−2
Subtotal		3	2	0	1	12	6	+6
Mali	Stade Malien	4	2	1	1	4	2	+2
Mali	Djoliba	2	1	1	0	2	0	+2
Mali	Real Bamako	0	0	0	0	0	0	0
Subtotal		6	3	2	1	6	2	+4
Morocco	Raja Casablanca	2	1	1	0	4	2	+2
Morocco	Wydad Casablanca	8	1	4	3	7	11	−4
Morocco	ASFAR	2	1	0	1	4	3	+1
Morocco	FUS Rabat	2	0	2	0	1	1	+0
Morocco	RS Berkane	2	0	0	2	0	6	−6
Morocco	Olympic Safi	4	1	3	0	2	1	+1
Subtotal		20	4	10	6	18	24	−6
Mozambique	Ferroviário Beira	2	0	2	0	1	1	0
Mozambique	Black Bulls	0	0	0	0	0	0	0
Subtotal		2	0	2	0	1	1	0
Niger	JS du Ténéré	2	1	1	0	2	1	+1
Niger	AS-FNIS	2	1	0	1	3	3	0
Niger	Liberté FC	2	1	0	1	4	1	+3
Niger	AS Sonidep	2	2	0	0	5	2	+3
Subtotal		8	5	1	2	14	7	+7
Nigeria	Enyimba	2	0	1	1	2	3	−1
Nigeria	Udoji United	2	1	0	1	3	2	+1
Nigeria	Bendel Insurance	2	1	0	1	3	3	0
Nigeria	Plateau United	2	1	0	1	5	2	+3
Nigeria	Rivers United	2	1	0	1	2	1	+1
Subtotal		10	4	1	5	15	11	+4
Rwanda	Rayon Sports	2	1	1	0	3	2	+1
Subtotal		2	1	1	0	3	2	+1
Senegal	ASC Jeanne d'Arc	2	0	1	1	2	3	−1
Senegal	AS Pikine	2	1	1	0	6	2	+4
Senegal	ASC Port Autonome	2	1	0	1	4	4	+0
Senegal	ASC Jaraaf	2	1	1	0	0	0	+2
Subtotal		8	3	3	2	14	9	+5
South Africa	Orlando Pirates	2	1	1	0	3	2	+1
South Africa	Supersport United	4	3	0	1	6	4	+2
South Africa	Mamelodi Sundowns	3	1	0	2	4	4	0
South Africa	Cape Town City	2	1	1	0	1	0	+1
South Africa	Marumo Gallants	2	1	0	1	2	2	+0
Subtotal		13	7	2	4	16	12	+4
Sudan	Al-Ahli SC	2	2	0	0	7	0	+7
Sudan	Al-Merrikh SC	2	1	0	1	1	1	0
Sudan	Al-Hilal	2	1	1	0	2	1	+1
Subtotal		6	4	1	1	10	2	+8
Tanzania	Young Africans	4	2	0	2	7	4	+3
Subtotal		4	2	0	2	7	4	+3
Togo	ASC Kara	2	2	0	0	4	1	+3
Subtotal		2	2	0	0	4	1	+3
Tunisia	Espérance	4	1	0	3	4	5	−1
Tunisia	AS Marsa	2	0	2	0	2	2	0
Tunisia	Stade Tunisien	2	1	0	1	2	1	+1
Tunisia	CS Sfaxien	0	0	0	0	0	0	0
Subtotal		8	2	2	4	8	8	+0
Zimbabwe	CAPS United	2	1	0	1	5	3	+2
Subtotal		2	1	0	1	5	3	+2
Total		183	88	45	50	282	169	+113

=== Non-CAF competitions ===
Result summary by country
Country	Pld	W	D	L	GF	GA	GD
Egypt	7	0	4	3	3	9	−6
Iraq	5	4	1	0	8	1	+7
Jordan	2	2	0	0	9	3	+6
Kuwait	4	1	2	1	6	6	0
Libya	1	1	0	0	2	1	+1
Mauritania	2	2	0	0	4	1	+3
Morocco	4	2	0	2	6	7	−1
Saudi Arabia	2	1	0	1	4	3	+1
Sudan	2	1	0	1	3	4	−1
Syria	3	1	1	1	4	2	+2
Tunisia	1	0	0	1	0	1	−1
Total	33	15	8	10	49	38	+11

== International competitions goals ==
Statistics correct as of game against Mamelodi Sundowns on November 8, 2026. (Note: All goals except one match USM Alger vs CD Travadores second leg CAF Champions League 1997 on March 24, 1997.)

List of USM Alger players with 4 or more goals
P	Player	TOTAL	CL1	C2	~~CAC~~ C3	SC
1	(Algeria) Billel Dziri	16	14	1	1	–
2	(Algeria) Tarek Hadj Adlane	15	7	2	6	–
3	(Mali) Mamadou Diallo	10	10	–	–	–
=	(Algeria) Oussama Darfalou	10	5	–	5	–
5	(Algeria) Issaad Bourahli	9	4	5	–	–
=	(Algeria) Aymen Mahious	9	5	–	4	–
7	(Algeria) Farouk Chafaï	7	5	–	2	–
=	(Algeria) Rabie Benchergui	7	3	4	–	–
=	(Algeria) Saâdi Radouani	7	–	–	6	1
10	(Algeria) Amar Ammour	6	4	2	–	–
=	(Algeria) Abderrahmane Meziane	6	1	–	5	–
=	(Algeria) Mohamed Rabie Meftah	6	6	–	–	–
=	(Algeria) Ismail Belkacemi	6	–	–	6	–
14	(Algeria) Zakaria Benchaâ	5	5	–	–	–
=	(Algeria) Moncef Ouichaoui	5	4	1	–	–

List of USM Alger players with 4 or more goals
P	Player	TOTAL	CL1	C2	~~CAC~~ C3	SC
=	(Mali) Mintou Doucoure	5	4	–	1	–
=	(Algeria) Zineddine Belaïd	5	–	–	4	1
=	(Algeria) Hocine Achiou	5	3	1	1	–
=	(Algeria) Ahmed Khaldi	5	–	–	4	1
20	(Algeria) Youcef Belaïli	4	4	–	–	–
=	(Mali) Abdoulaye Kanou	4	–	–	4	–
=	(Algeria) Nacer Zekri	4	4	–	–	–
=	(Algeria) Khaled Bousseliou	4	–	–	4	–
=	(Algeria) Mohamed Seguer	4	3	–	1	–
=	(Algeria) Kaddour Beldjilali	4	3	–	1	–
=	(Algeria) Mohamed Hamdoud	4	3	1	–	–
=	(Algeria) Houssam Ghacha	4	–	–	4	–
=	(Algeria) Adam Alilet	4	–	–	4	–
=	(Algeria) Islam Merili	4	–	–	4	–
Totals		279	129	40	106	4

=== Hat-tricks ===
N	Date	Player	Match	Score	Time of goals
1	16 May 1999	Tarek Hadj Adlane	USM Alger – Al-Ahli Wad Madani	5–0	10', 20', 46'
2	15 September 2002	Rabie Benchergui	USM Alger – US Transfoot	8–2	16', 39', 60'
3	10 April 2004	Mamadou Diallo	USM Alger – ASFA Yennenga	8–1	31', 62', 88'

=== Two goals one match ===
N	Date	Player	Match	Score
1	8 Mar 1997	Zekri	USM Alger – CD Travadores	6–1
2	8 Mar 1997	Dziri	USM Alger – CD Travadores	6–1
3	8 Mar 1997	Hadj Adlane	USM Alger – CD Travadores	6–1
4	27 Aug 1997	Hadj Adlane	USM Alger – Raja Casablanca	2–2
5	12 Oct 1997	Dziri	Raja Casablanca – USM Alger	0–2
6	14 Mar 1999	Hadj Adlane	USM Alger – Horoya AC	2–1
7	15 Sep 2002	Ghazi	USM Alger – US Transfoot	8–2
8	20 Oct 2002	Bourahli	USM Alger – WAC Casablanca	2–2
9	5 Sep 2003	Ouichaoui	USM Alger – Canon Yaoundé	3–0
10	10 Apr 2004	Dziri	USM Alger – ASFA Yennenga	8–1
11	24 Apr 2004	Diallo	ASFA Yennenga – USM Alger	2–2
12	23 Jul 2004	Diallo	USM Alger – Supersport United	2–1
13	10 Sep 2004	Bourahli	USM Alger – Espérance de Tunis	3–0
14	6 Mar 2005	Ammour	Olympic Azzaweya – USM Alger	0–2
15	18 Mar 2005	Doucoure	USM Alger – Olympic Azzaweya	5–0
16	18 Mar 2005	Belkheïr	USM Alger – Olympic Azzaweya	5–0
17	26 Jan 2007	Doucoure	USM Alger – AS GNN	3–1
18	15 Mar 2015	R.Meftah	USM Alger – AS Pikine	5–1
19	9 Jul 2017	Darfalou	USM Alger – CAPS United	4–1
20	17 Apr 2018	Darfalou	USM Alger – Plateau United	4–0

N	Date	Player	Match	Score
21	9 Aug 2019	Benchaâ	AS Sonidep – USM Alger	1–2
22	15 Sep 2019	R.Meftah	USM Alger – Gor Mahia	4–1
23	15 Sep 2019	Benchaâ	USM Alger – Gor Mahia	4–1
24	29 Sep 2019	Mahious	Gor Mahia – USM Alger	0–2
25	16 Oct 2022	Meziane	USM Alger – ASC Kara	2–1
26	12 Feb 2023	Bousseliou	USM Alger – FC Saint Éloi Lupopo	3–0
27	2 Apr 2023	Alilet	USM Alger – Al Akhdar	4–1
28	7 Apr 2024	Kanou	USM Alger – Rivers United	2–0
29	27 Nov 2024	Belkacemi	USM Alger – Orapa United	6–0
30	15 Dec 2024	Belkacemi	USM Alger – ASEC Mimosas	3–0
31	25 Oct 2025	Ghacha	USM Alger – AFAD Djékanou	3–0

== Non-CAF competitions goals ==
P	Player	Goals
1	(Algeria) Amar Ammour	5
2	(Algeria) Billel Dziri	4
=	(Algeria) Lamouri Djediat	4
4	(Mali) Mintou Doucoure	3
=	(Algeria) Noureddine Daham	3
6	(Algeria) Salim Hanifi	2
=	(Algeria) Mohamed Rabie Meftah	2
=	(Algeria) Hocine Achiou	2
=	(Algeria) Rafik Deghiche	2
9	(Algeria) Samir Bentayeb	1

P	Player	Goals
=	(Algeria) Moncef Ouichaoui	1
=	(Cameroon) Daniel Moncharé	1
=	(Algeria) Mohamed Hamdoud	1
=	(Algeria) Mokhtar Benmoussa	1
=	(Algeria) Farouk Chafaï	1
=	(Algeria) Issaad Bourahli	1
=	(Algeria) Aymen Mahious	1
=	(Algeria) Mohamed Amine Hamia	1
=	(Algeria) Oualid Ardji	1
=	(Algeria) Farès Mecheri	1

P	Player	Goals
=	(Algeria) Ali Rial	1
=	(Algeria) Bouazza Feham	1
=	(Algeria) Saad Tedjar	1
=	(Algeria) Ahmed Gasmi	1
=	(Algeria) Hichem Mokhtari	1
=	(Algeria) Lakhdar Guitoun	1
=	(Algeria) Kamel Tchalabi	1
=	(Algeria) Ahmed Attoui	1
=	(Algeria) Oussama Chita	1
=	Own Goals	2

== List of All-time appearances ==
This List of All-time appearances for USM Alger in African competitions contains football players who have played for USM Alger in African football competitions 20 or more appearances.

Gold Still playing competitive football in USM Alger. (Note: Since 2000 African Cup Winners' Cup as of game against JS du Ténéré on April 1, 2000, Statistics correct as of game against Mamelodi Sundowns on November 8, 2026.)

#	Name	Position	CL1	C2	~~CC~~ C3	SC	TOTAL	Date of first cap	Debut against	Date of last cap	Final match against
1	(Algeria) Oussama Benbot	GK	–	–	48	2	50	9 Oct 2022	ASC Kara	—	—
2	(Algeria) Lamine Zemmamouche	GK	37	–	12	–	49	19 Feb 2006	RC Kadiogo	24 Jan 2020	Wydad Casablanca
3	(Algeria) Saâdi Radouani	RB	–	–	41	2	43	9 Oct 2022	ASC Kara	—	—
4	(Algeria) Mohamed Rabie Meftah	RB	29	–	12	–	41	19 Apr 2013	US Bitam	1 Feb 2020	Petro de Luanda
5	(Algeria) Islam Merili	AM	–	–	40	1	41	16 Oct 2022	ASC Kara	16 May 2026	Zamalek
6	(Algeria) Brahim Benzaza	DM	–	–	40	1	41	16 Oct 2022	ASC Kara	16 May 2026	Zamalek
7	(Algeria) Oussama Chita	DM	2	–	35	1	38	17 Apr 2018	Plateau United	9 Apr 2025	CS Constantine
8	(Algeria) Hamza Koudri	DM	28	–	10	–	38	1 Mar 2015	Foullah Edifice	1 Feb 2020	Petro de Luanda
9	(Algeria) Farouk Chafaï	CB	23	–	14	–	37	15 Feb 2015	Foullah Edifice	23 Sep 2018	Al-Masry
10	(Algeria) Hocine Achiou	AM	27	8	2	–	37	1 Apr 2000	Ténéré	2 Apr 2006	Port Autonome
11	(Algeria) Mokhtar Benmoussa	LW / LB	26	–	10	–	36	19 Apr 2013	US Bitam	23 Sep 2018	Al-Masry
12	(Algeria) Farid Djahnine	MF	25	8	2	–	35	1 Apr 2000	Ténéré	2 Apr 2006	Port Autonome
13	(Algeria) Mounir Zeghdoud	CB	26	7	2	–	35	10 Mar 2002	Gazelle	3 Mar 2006	RC Kadiogo
14	(Algeria) Adam Alilet	CB	2	–	31	1	34	29 Sep 2019	Gor Mahia	23 Nov 2025	San Pédro
15	(Algeria) Billel Dziri	CM	25	7	2	–	34	10 Mar 2002	Gazelle	10 Feb 2007	AS GNN
16	(Algeria) Mohamed Hamdoud	RB	27	5	1	–	33	1 Apr 2000	Ténéré	10 Feb 2007	AS GNN
17	(Algeria) Abderrahmane Meziane	ST	13	–	20	–	33	3 Apr 2015	Pikine	3 Jun 2023	Young Africans
18	(Algeria) Ismaïl Belkacemi	ST	–	–	28	1	29	9 Oct 2022	ASC Kara	19 Jan 2025	ASC Jaraaf
19	(Algeria) Aymen Mahious	ST	10	–	19	–	29	18 Jul 2018	Rayon Sports	3 Jun 2023	Young Africans
20	(Algeria) Amar Ammour	AM	25	4	–	–	29	1 Sep 2002	Transfoot	10 Feb 2007	AS GNN
21	(Algeria) Rabah Deghmani	CB	21	6	1	–	28	10 Mar 2002	Gazelle	2 Apr 2006	Port Autonome
22	(Algeria) Mohammed Benkhemassa	DM	18	–	9	–	27	1 Mar 2015	Foullah Edifice	23 Sep 2018	Al-Masry
23	(Algeria) Zineddine Belaïd	CB	–	–	25	1	26	9 Oct 2022	ASC Kara	7 Apr 2024	Rivers United
24	(Algeria) Taher Benkhelifa	DM	7	–	18	1	26	15 Sep 2019	Gor Mahia	20 Dec 2023	Future
25	(Algeria) Mahieddine Meftah	LB	17	7	2	–	26	1 Apr 2000	Ténéré	21 May 2005	AS Marsa
26	(Algeria) Karim Ghazi	DM	18	7	1	–	26	1 Apr 2000	Ténéré	10 Feb 2007	AS GNN
27	(Algeria) Haithem Loucif	RB	–	–	26	1	27	2 Nov 2022	Cape Town City	—	—
28	(Democratic Republic of the Congo) Glody Likonza	AM	–	–	24	1	25	14 Sep 2024	Stade Tunisien	—	—
29	(Algeria) Ayoub Abdellaoui	LB / CB	18	–	6	–	24	1 Mar 2015	Foullah Edifice	16 May 2018	Gor Mahia
30	(Algeria) Hocine Metref	DM	22	–	2	–	24	9 Aug 2003	AC Aviação	10 Feb 2007	AS GNN
31	(Algeria) Salim Aribi	CB	20	4	–	–	24	13 Sep 2002	Transfoot	2 Apr 2006	Port Autonome
32	(Algeria) Hocine Dehiri	CB	–	–	24	–	24	1 Oct 2023	FUS Rabat	16 May 2026	Zamalek
33	(Algeria) Abderaouf Benguit	RB / RM	10	–	12	–	22	11 Mar 2017	RC Kadiogo	—	—
34	(Algeria) Houssam Ghacha	LW	–	–	21	–	21	14 Sep 2024	Stade Tunisien	—	—
35	(Madagascar) Carolus Andriamatsinoro	CF	20	–	–	–	20	15 Feb 2015	Foullah Edifice	30 Jun 2017	Al-Ahli Tripoli
36	(Algeria) Rabie Benchergui	ST	15	4	1	–	20	10 Mar 2002	Gazelle	18 Mar 2006	Port Autonome
