= 2012–13 UAFA Club Cup qualifying play-off =

The 2012–13 UAFA Club Cup qualifying rounds was played from 11 September to 5 December 2012. A total of 22 teams from Africa and Asia zones competed in the qualifying rounds to decide the 8 places in the knock-out stage of the 2012–13 UAFA Club Cup.

== Teams ==
The following 22 teams (10 from African Zone and 12 from Asian Zone) entered the qualifying rounds, which consisted of two rounds (first Round and second Round):

- Eleven teams (3 from African Zone, 8 from Asian Zone) entered in first Round.
- Eleven teams (7 from African Zone, 4 from Asian Zone) entered in second Round.

Zone	Teams entering in second round	Teams entering in first round
Africa Zone	(Algeria) CR Belouizdad; (Algeria) USM Alger; (Egypt) Ismaily SC; (Mauritania) Tevragh-Zeina; (Morocco) Raja Casablanca; (Sudan) Al-Khartoum; (Tunisia) CA Bizertin	(Comoros) Steal Nouvel FC; (Djibouti) Garde Républicaine; (Somalia) Sahafi
Asia Zone	(Iraq) Al-Quwa Al-Jawiya; (Jordan) Al-Baqa'a; (Kuwait) Al-Arabi; (Saudi Arabia) Al-Nassr	(Bahrain) Al-Hidd; (Jordan) Shabab Al-Ordon; (Kuwait) Al-Jahra; (Lebanon) Nejmeh; (Oman) Al-Oruba; (Palestine) Shabab Al-Dhahiriya; (Saudi Arabia) Al-Fateh; (Yemen) Shaab Ibb

== Format ==
Qualification ties were decided over two legs, with aggregate goals used to determine the winner. If the sides were level on aggregate after the second leg, the away goals rule was applied, and if still level, the tie proceeded to a penalty shootout after extra time was played.

== Schedule ==
The schedule of each round was as follows.

Round	Zone	First leg	Second leg
First Round	Africa	11–14 Sep 2012	
First Round	Asia	18 Sep 2012	26 Sep 2012
Second Round	Africa	19–20 Oct – 20 Nov 2012	24–25 Nov – 2&7 Dec 2012
Second Round	Asia	27 Nov 2012	5 Dec 2012

== First round ==
The draw was made in June 2012.

=== African zone ===
Three teams play a tournament matches as a championship in Moroni, Comoros. Only one team qualify to the next round.

Pos	Team	Pld	W	D	L	GF	GA	GD	Pts	Qualification	STE	SAH	GAR
1	(Comoros) Steal Nouvel FC	2	2	0	0	5	2	+3	6	Advanced to Second round	—	2–0	3–2
2	(Somalia) Sahafi	2	1	0	1	1	2	−1	3		—	—	1–0
3	(Djibouti) Garde Républicaine	2	0	0	2	2	4	−2	0		—	—	—

Source: RSSSF
11 September 2012
15:00

Steal Nouvel FC (Comoros)	3–2	(Djibouti) Garde Républicaine
Miki 42', 85'; Q. Mohammed 90+2'		Issa 27', 66'

Stade Said Mohamed Cheikh, Moroni
Attendance: 1,000
Referee: Anis Salem Abdullah (Yemen)

12 September 2012
15:00

Sahafi (Somalia)	1–0	(Djibouti) Garde Républicaine
J. Mohammed 65'

Stade Said Mohamed Cheikh, Moroni
Referee: Yasser Al-Rawahi (Oman)

14 September 2012
15:00

Steal Nouvel FC (Comoros)	2–0	(Somalia) Sahafi
Shima 60'; Miki 87'

Stade Said Mohamed Cheikh, Moroni
Referee: Abdulrahman Al-Amri (Saudi Arabia)

=== Asian zone ===
Team 1	Agg.	Team 2	1st leg	2nd leg
Shaab Ibb (Yemen)	3–3 (a)	(Lebanon) Nejmeh	0–2	3–1
Al-Oruba (Oman)	1–3	(Palestine) Shabab Al-Dhahiriya	1–0	0–3
Al-Jahra (Kuwait)	1–3	(Saudi Arabia) Al-Fateh	1–2	0–1
Shabab Al-Ordon (Jordan)	1–1 (a)	(Bahrain) Al-Hidd	1–1	0–0

Notes

2. Al-Oruba did not play the second leg and the result was awarded 3–0 to Shabab Al-Dhahiriya.
18 September 2012
16:00

Shaab Ibb (Yemen)	0–2	(Lebanon) Nejmeh
		Takaji 79'; H. Mohamad 86'

Ali Mohsen Al-Muraisi Stadium, Sana‘a
Referee: Al-Nemari (Saudi Arabia)
26 September 2012

Nejmeh (Lebanon)	1–3	(Yemen) Shaab Ibb
Atwi 88' (pen.)		Rajih 26' (pen.), 86' (pen.); El-Haddad 37'

Beirut Municipal Stadium, Beirut
Referee: Younis (Egypt)

Shaab Ibb advanced on the away goal rule after drawing 3–3 on aggregate.

18 September 2012
18:00

Al-Oruba (Oman)	1–0	(Palestine) Shabab Al-Dhahiriya
Lorenzo 50'

Sur Sports Complex, Sur
Referee: Al-Labany (Yemen)
26 September 2012
19:00

Shabab Al-Dhahiriya (Palestine)	3–0 Awarded	(Oman) Al-Oruba

Dura International Stadium, Dura

Shabab Al-Dhahiriya won 3–1 on aggregate.

18 September 2012
18:30

Al-Jahra (Kuwait)	1–2	(Saudi Arabia) Al-Fateh
Silva 33'		Fuakumputu 35'; Al-Asmari 85'

Mubarak Alaiar Stadium, Al Jahra
Referee: Al-Kuwari (Qatar)
26 September 2012
20:30

Al-Fateh (Saudi Arabia)	1–0	(Kuwait) Al-Jahra
Fuakumputu 90+1'

Prince Abdullah bin Jalawi Stadium, Al-Hasa
Referee: Jameel Abdulhusin (Bahrain)

Al-Fateh won 3–1 on aggregate.

18 September 2012
19:00

Shabab Al-Ordon (Jordan)	1–1	(Bahrain) Al-Hidd
Shishani 86'		Al Malood 75'

Amman International Stadium, Amman
Referee: Wathik Al-Baag (Iraq)
26 September 2012
19:00

Al-Hidd (Bahrain)	0–0	(Jordan) Shabab Al-Ordon

Bahrain National Stadium, Manama
Referee: Al-Hosni (Oman)

Al-Hidd advanced on the away goal rule after drawing 1–1 on aggregate.

== Second round ==
The draw was held in Amman, Jordan on 29 September.

Team 1	Agg.	Team 2	1st leg	2nd leg
Africa zone
Tevragh-Zeina (Mauritania)	1–4	(Algeria) USM Alger	0–2	1–2
Steal Nouvel FC (Comoros)	4–5	(Algeria) CR Belouizdad	3–0	1–5
Raja Casablanca (Morocco)	4–2	(Tunisia) CA Bizertin	4–0	0–2
Al-Khartoum (Sudan)	3–6	(Egypt) Ismaily SC	3–1	0–5
Asia zone
Al-Nassr (Saudi Arabia)	5–0	(Bahrain) Al-Hidd	3–0	2–0
Al-Quwa Al-Jawiya (Iraq)	4–0	(Palestine) Shabab Al-Dhahiriya	3–0	1–0
Al-Arabi (Kuwait)	5–4	(Saudi Arabia) Al-Fateh	3–2	2–2
Shaab Ibb (Yemen)	1–3	(Jordan) Al-Baqa'a	1–0	0–3

Notes

2. CR Belouizdad did not play the first leg and the result was awarded 3–0 to Steal Nouvel FC.

=== African zone ===
19 October 2012
16:30

Tevragh-Zeina (Mauritania)	0–2	(Algeria) USM Alger
		Benmoussa 26'; Daham 42'

Stade Olympique, Nouakchott
Referee: Redouane Jiyed (Morocco)
24 November 2012
19:00

USM Alger (Algeria)	2–1	(Mauritania) Tevragh-Zeina
Daham 52'; Tedjar 58' (pen.)		Cheikh 71'

Stade Omar Hamadi, Algiers
Referee: Abdellah Al Achiri (Morocco)

USM Alger won 4–1 on aggregate.

20 October 2012
15:00

Steal Nouvel FC (Comoros)	3–0 Awarded	(Algeria) CR Belouizdad

Stade Said Mohamed Cheikh, Moroni
Referee: Adam Ahmed Hashem (Sudan)
7 December 2012
18:00

CR Belouizdad (Algeria)	5–1	(Comoros) Steal Nouvel FC
Angan 7'; Benaldjia 40'; Ammour 50'; Harkat 76'; Sodje 85'		Souleiman 75'

Stade 20 Août 1955, Algiers
Referee: Mohamed Ben Hassana (Tunisia)

CR Belouizdad won 5–4 on aggregate.

20 October 2012
19:00

Raja Casablanca (Morocco)	4–0	(Tunisia) CA Bizertin
Iajour 17', 38'; Hafidi 79'; Abourazzouk 89'

Stade Mohamed V, Casablanca
Referee: Djamel Haimoudi (Algeria)
25 November 2012
14:30

CA Bizertin (Tunisia)	2–0	(Morocco) Raja Casablanca
Machani 6'; Rjaïbi 38'

Stade 15 Octobre, Bizerte
Referee: Fahim Omar (Egypt)

Raja Casablanca won 4–2 on aggregate.

20 November 2012
13:30

Al-Khartoum (Sudan)	3–1	(Egypt) Ismaily SC
Abd Al Momen 52'; Al-Jazuli 58'; Khalifa 77'		Antwi 44'

Khartoum Stadium, Khartoum
Referee: Yosr Saadallah (Tunisia)
2 December 2012
17:00

Ismaily SC (Egypt)	5–0	(Sudan) Al-Khartoum
Ali 1', 90'; Antwi 17'; Khairy 20', 84'

Borg El Arab Stadium, Alexandria
Attendance: closed doors
Referee: Fahad Al-Mirdasi (Saudi Arabia)

Ismaily SC won 6–3 on aggregate.

=== Asian zone ===
27 November 2012
16:00

Al-Quwa Al-Jawiya (Iraq)	3–0	(Palestine) Shabab Al-Dhahiriya
Saad 31'; Tariq 65'; Ahmad 70'

Franso Hariri Stadium, Erbil
Referee: Ali Sabbagh (Lebanon)
5 December 2012

Shabab Al-Dhahiriya (Palestine)	0–1	(Iraq) Al-Quwa Al-Jawiya
		Ahmad 90+1'

Dura International Stadium, Dura
Referee: Suleiman Jaber Dalqam (Jordan)

Al-Quwa Al-Jawiya won 4–0 on aggregate

27 November 2012
16:00

Shaab Ibb (Yemen)	1–0	(Jordan) Al-Baqa'a
Huzam 27'

Ali Mohsen Al-Muraisi Stadium, Sana'a
Referee: Salah Mohamed Abbas Al-Abbasi (Bahrain)
5 December 2012

Al-Baqa'a (Jordan)	3–0	(Yemen) Shaab Ibb
A. Adous 24' (pen.); Abdel-Haleem 30'; Al Rifai 72'

Amman International Stadium, Amman
Referee: Shadi Asfour (Syria)

Al-Baqa'a won 3–1 on aggregate

27 November 2012
19:00

Al-Arabi (Kuwait)	3–2	(Saudi Arabia) Al-Fateh
Abdulghafoor 27'; Al-Rashidi 36', 38'		Élton 28' (pen.), 60' (pen.)

Sabah Al-Salem Stadium, Al-Mansouriah (Kuwait City)
Referee: Hamad Ahmed Hashmi (United Arab Emirates)
5 December 2012

Al-Fateh (Saudi Arabia)	2–2	(Kuwait) Al-Arabi
Élton 36' (pen.); Sufyani 39'		Al-Rashidi 27'; Hayel 76'

Prince Abdullah bin Jalawi Stadium, Al-Hasa
Referee: Haitham Mohammed Ali (Iraq)

Al-Arabi won 5–4 on aggregate

27 November 2012
19:00

Al-Nassr (Saudi Arabia)	3–0	(Bahrain) Al-Hidd
Ayoví 69' (pen.); Hamood 71'; Al-Sahlawi 78'

King Fahd Stadium, Riyadh
Referee: Khamis Al-Marri (Qatar)
5 December 2012

Al-Hidd (Bahrain)	0–2	(Saudi Arabia) Al-Nassr
		Al-Ghamdi 32'; Al-Qahtani 88'

Bahrain National Stadium, Manama
Referee: Yousef Al-Marzouq (Kuwait)

Al-Nassr won 5–0 on aggregate
