= 2012–13 UAFA Club Cup =

كأس الإتحاد العربي للأندية 2012–13

Tournament details
- Dates: 11 September 2012 – 14 May 2013
- Teams: 22 (from 1 association)

Final positions
- Champions: (Algeria) USM Alger (1st title)
- Runners-up: (Kuwait) Al-Arabi

Tournament statistics
- Matches played: 39
- Goals scored: 107 (2.74 per match)
- Top scorer(s): (Algeria) Lamouri Djediat (Kuwait) Fahad Al-Rashidi (4 goals each)

The 2012–13 UAFA Club Cup was the 26th season of the Arab World's inter-club football tournament organised by UAFA, and the first season since it was renamed from the Arab Champions League to the UAFA Cup. 22 teams participated to this tournament.

USM Alger won the tournament after beating Al-Arabi 3–2 on aggregate in the final.

== Participating teams ==
| Country | Team | Qualifying method |
Africa zone
| Algeria (2) | USM Alger | 2011–12 Algerian Ligue Professionnelle 1 3rd place |
| Algeria (2) | CR Belouizdad | 2011–12 Algerian Ligue Professionnelle 1 4th place |
| Comoros (1) | Steal Nouvel FC | 2012 Comoros Cup winners |
| Djibouti (1) | Garde Républicaine | 2012 Djibouti Cup winners |
| Egypt (1) | Ismaily SC | 2010–11 Egyptian Premier League 3rd place |
| Mauritania (1) | Tevragh-Zeina | 2011–12 Mauritanian Premier League champions |
| Morocco (1) | Raja Casablanca | 2011–12 Botola 4th place |
| Somalia (1) | Sahafi | Somali First Division representative |
| Sudan (1) | Khartoum NC | 2011 Sudan Premier League 5th place |
| Tunisia (1) | CA Bizertin | 2011–12 Tunisian Ligue Professionnelle 1 runners-up |
Asia zone
| Bahrain (1) | Al-Hidd | 2011–12 Bahrain First Division League 4th place |
| Iraq (1) | Al-Quwa Al-Jawiya | 2011–12 Iraqi Elite League 3rd place |
| Jordan (2) | Al-Baqa'a | 2011–12 Jordan League 4th place |
| Jordan (2) | Shabab Al-Ordon | 2011–12 Jordan League 7th place |
| Kuwait (2) | Al-Arabi | 2011–12 Kuwaiti Premier League 3rd place |
| Kuwait (2) | Al-Jahra | 2011–12 Kuwaiti Premier League 5th place |
| Lebanon (1) | Nejmeh | 2011–12 Lebanese Premier League runners-up |
| Oman (1) | Al-Oruba | 2011–12 Oman Elite League 3rd place |
| Palestine (1) | Shabab Al-Dhahiriya | 2011–12 West Bank Premier League 3rd place |
| Saudi Arabia (2) | Al-Nassr | 2011–12 Saudi Professional League 6th place |
| Saudi Arabia (2) | Al-Fateh | 2011–12 Saudi Professional League 7th place |
| Yemen (1) | Shaab Ibb | 2011–12 Yemeni League champions |

== Qualifying rounds ==
=== First round ===
==== African zone ====
Three teams play a tournament matches as a championship in Moroni, Comoros. Only one team qualify to the next round.

| Pos | Team | Pld | W | D | L | GF | GA | GD | Pts | Qualification | STE | SAH | GAR |
|---|---|---|---|---|---|---|---|---|---|---|---|---|---|
| 1 | (Comoros) Steal Nouvel FC | 2 | 2 | 0 | 0 | 5 | 2 | +3 | 6 | Advanced to Second round | — | 2–0 | 3–2 |
| 2 | (Somalia) Sahafi | 2 | 1 | 0 | 1 | 1 | 2 | −1 | 3 | | — | — | 1–0 |
| 3 | (Djibouti) Garde Républicaine | 2 | 0 | 0 | 2 | 2 | 4 | −2 | 0 | | — | — | — |

Source: RSSSF

==== Asian zone ====
| Team 1 | Agg. | Team 2 | 1st leg | 2nd leg |
|---|---|---|---|---|
| Shaab Ibb (Yemen) | 3–3 (a) | (Lebanon) Nejmeh | 0–2 | 3–1 |
| Al-Oruba (Oman) | 1–3 | (Palestine) Shabab Al-Dhahiriya | 1–0 | 0–3 |
| Al-Jahra (Kuwait) | 1–3 | (Saudi Arabia) Al-Fateh | 1–2 | 0–1 |
| Shabab Al-Ordon (Jordan) | 1–1 (a) | (Bahrain) Al-Hidd | 1–1 | 0–0 |

Notes

2. Al-Oruba did not play the second leg and the result was awarded 3–0 to Shabab Al-Dhahiriya.

=== Second round ===
| Team 1 | Agg. | Team 2 | 1st leg | 2nd leg |
Africa zone
| Tevragh-Zeina (Mauritania) | 1–4 | (Algeria) USM Alger | 0–2 | 1–2 |
| Steal Nouvel FC (Comoros) | 4–5 | (Algeria) CR Belouizdad | 3–0 | 1–5 |
| Raja Casablanca (Morocco) | 4–2 | (Tunisia) CA Bizertin | 4–0 | 0–2 |
| Al-Khartoum (Sudan) | 3–6 | (Egypt) Ismaily SC | 3–1 | 0–5 |
Asia zone
| Al-Nassr (Saudi Arabia) | 5–0 | (Bahrain) Al-Hidd | 3–0 | 2–0 |
| Al-Quwa Al-Jawiya (Iraq) | 4–0 | (Palestine) Shabab Al-Dhahiriya | 3–0 | 1–0 |
| Al-Arabi (Kuwait) | 5–4 | (Saudi Arabia) Al-Fateh | 3–2 | 2–2 |
| Shaab Ibb (Yemen) | 1–3 | (Jordan) Al-Baqa'a | 1–0 | 0–3 |

Notes

2. CR Belouizdad did not play the first leg and the result was awarded 3–0 to Steal Nouvel FC.

== Knock-out stage ==
=== Bracket ===
Quarter-finals
(Saudi Arabia) Al-Nassr | 3 | 0 | 3
(Kuwait) Al-Arabi | 2 | 2 | 4
(Iraq) Al-Quwa Al-Jawiya | 1 | 0 | 1
(Morocco) Raja Casablanca | 1 | 2 | 3
(Jordan) Al-Baqa'a | 1 | 2 | 3
(Algeria) USM Alger | 6 | 3 | 9
(Algeria) CR Belouizdad | 1 | 1 | 2 (1)
(Egypt) Ismaily SC (aet; p) | 1 | 1 | 2 (4)

Semi-finals
(Kuwait) Al-Arabi (a) | 1 | 2 | 3
(Morocco) Raja Casablanca | 1 | 2 | 3
(Algeria) USM Alger (aet; p) | 0 | 0 | 0 (4)
(Egypt) Ismaily SC | 0 | 0 | 0 (3)

Final
(Kuwait) Al-Arabi | 0 | 2 | 2
(Algeria) USM Alger | 0 | 3 | 3

=== Quarter-finals ===
| Team 1 | Agg. | Team 2 | 1st leg | 2nd leg |
|---|---|---|---|---|
| Al-Quwa Al-Jawiya (Iraq) | 1–3 | (Morocco) Raja Casablanca | 1–1 | 0–2 |
| Al-Baqa'a (Jordan) | 3–9 | (Algeria) USM Alger | 1–6 | 2–3 |
| CR Belouizdad (Algeria) | 2–2 (1–4 p) | (Egypt) Ismaily SC | 1–1 | 1–1 (a.e.t.) |
| Al-Nassr (Saudi Arabia) | 3–4 | (Kuwait) Al-Arabi | 3–2 | 0–2 |

=== Semi-finals ===
| Team 1 | Agg. | Team 2 | 1st leg | 2nd leg |
|---|---|---|---|---|
| USM Alger (Algeria) | 0–0 (4–3 p) | (Egypt) Ismaily SC | 0–0 | 0–0 (a.e.t.) |
| Al-Arabi (Kuwait) | 3–3 (a) | (Morocco) Raja Casablanca | 1–1 | 2–2 |

=== Final ===
24 April 2013
17:00

| Al-Arabi (Kuwait) | 0–0 | (Algeria) USM Alger |

Sabah Al-Salem Stadium, Al-Mansouriah (Kuwait City)
Attendance: 23,456
Referee: Mohammad Arafah (Jordan)
14 May 2013
17:30

| USM Alger (Algeria) | 3–2 | (Kuwait) Al-Arabi |
|---|---|---|
| Daham 12'; Djediat 36'; Meftah 75' (pen.) | | 57' Fall; 61' Al-Moussawi |

Stade 5 Juillet 1962, Algiers
Attendance: 50,000
Referee: Khalil Jalal (Saudi Arabia)

USM Alger won 3–2 on aggregate.

== Champions ==
2012–13 UAFA Club Cup winners

USM Alger
First Title

== Top scorers ==
Updated as of games played on 27 February 2013.

| Rank | Player | Club | Goals |
|---|---|---|---|
| 1 | (Algeria) Lamouri Djediat | (Algeria) USM Alger | 4 |
| 1 | (Kuwait) Fahad Al-Rashidi | (Kuwait) Al-Arabi SC | 4 |
| 3 | (Algeria) Noureddine Daham | (Algeria) USM Alger | 3 |
| 3 | (Comoros) Miki | (Comoros) Steal Nouvel FC | 3 |
| 3 | (Iraq) Hammadi Ahmad | (Iraq) Al-Quwa Al-Jawiya | 3 |
| 3 | (Kuwait) Hussain Al-Musawi | (Kuwait) Al-Arabi SC | 3 |
| 3 | (Senegal) Kader Fall | (Kuwait) Al-Arabi SC | 3 |
| 3 | (Brazil) Élton | (Saudi Arabia) Al-Fateh SC | 3 |
| 9 | (Algeria) Islam Slimani | (Algeria) CR Belouizdad | 2 |
| 9 | (Algeria) Salim Hanifi | (Algeria) USM Alger | 2 |
| 9 | (Djibouti) Mohamed Liban | (Djibouti) Garde Républicaine FC | 2 |
| 9 | (Egypt) Ahmed Ali | (Egypt) Ismaily SC | 2 |
| 9 | (Egypt) Ahmed Khairy | (Egypt) Ismaily SC | 2 |
| 9 | (Ghana) John Antwi | (Egypt) Ismaily SC | 2 |
| 9 | (Jordan) Adnan Adous | (Jordan) Al-Baqa'a SC | 2 |
| 9 | (Syria) Wael Al Rifai | (Jordan) Al-Baqa'a SC | 2 |
| 9 | (Jordan) Ahmed Hayel | (Kuwait) Al-Arabi SC | 2 |
| 9 | (Morocco) Abdelilah Hafidi | (Morocco) Raja Casablanca | 2 |
| 9 | (Morocco) Mouhcine Iajour | (Morocco) Raja Casablanca | 2 |
| 9 | (Morocco) Mouhcine Moutouali | (Morocco) Raja Casablanca | 2 |
| 9 | (Democratic Republic of the Congo) Doris Fuakumputu | (Saudi Arabia) Al-Fateh SC | 2 |
| 9 | (Saudi Arabia) Mohammad Al-Sahlawi | (Saudi Arabia) Al Nassr FC | 2 |
| 9 | (Yemen) Natiq Rajih | (Yemen) Shaab Ibb | 2 |
