= 2012–13 UAFA Club Cup knockout stage =

The 2012–13 UAFA Club Cup knock-out stage matches took place from 8 February to 14 May 2013. A total of 8 teams competed in the knock-out stage to decide the champions of the 2012–13 UAFA Club Cup.

== Format ==
All knock-out ties were decided over two legs, with aggregate goals used to determine the winner. If the sides were level on aggregate after the second leg, the away goals rule applied, and if still level, the tie proceeded to a penalty shootout after extra time is played.

== Schedule ==
The schedule of each round was as follows.

Round	First leg	Second leg
Quarter-finals	8–13 February 2013	26–27 February 2013
Semi-finals	12 March 2013	2–3 April 2013
Final	24 April 2013	14 May 2013

== Qualified teams ==
The knock-out stage featured eight teams: four from Africa zone and four from Asia zone took place in quarterfinals.

- Africa zone teams:
  - (Algeria) CR Belouizdad
  - (Algeria) USM Alger
  - (Egypt) Ismaily SC
  - (Morocco) Raja Casablanca
- Asia zone teams:
  - (Iraq) Al-Quwa Al-Jawiya
  - (Jordan) Al-Baqa'a
  - (Kuwait) Al-Arabi
  - (Saudi Arabia) Al-Nassr

== Bracket ==
Quarter-finals
(Saudi Arabia) Al-Nassr	3	0	3
(Kuwait) Al-Arabi	2	2	4
(Iraq) Al-Quwa Al-Jawiya	1	0	1
(Morocco) Raja Casablanca	1	2	3
(Jordan) Al-Baqa'a	1	2	3
(Algeria) USM Alger	6	3	9
(Algeria) CR Belouizdad	1	1	2 (1)
(Egypt) Ismaily SC (aet; p)	1	1	2 (4)

Semi-finals
(Kuwait) Al-Arabi (a)	1	2	3
(Morocco) Raja Casablanca	1	2	3
(Algeria) USM Alger (aet; p)	0	0	0 (4)
(Egypt) Ismaily SC	0	0	0 (3)

Final
(Kuwait) Al-Arabi	0	2	2
(Algeria) USM Alger	0	3	3

== Quarter-finals ==
Team 1	Agg.	Team 2	1st leg	2nd leg
Al-Quwa Al-Jawiya (Iraq)	1–3	(Morocco) Raja Casablanca	1–1	0–2
Al-Baqa'a (Jordan)	3–9	(Algeria) USM Alger	1–6	2–3
CR Belouizdad (Algeria)	2–2 (1–4 p)	(Egypt) Ismaily SC	1–1	1–1 (a.e.t.)
Al-Nassr (Saudi Arabia)	3–4	(Kuwait) Al-Arabi	3–2	0–2

8 February 2013
15:00

Al-Quwa Al-Jawiya (Iraq)	1–1	(Morocco) Raja Casablanca
Ahmad 62'		82' Boukhriss

Franso Hariri Stadium, Erbil
Referee: Andre El Haddad (Lebanon)
27 February 2013
19:00

Raja Casablanca (Morocco)	2–0	(Iraq) Al-Quwa Al-Jawiya
Salhi 34'; Eddine 88'

Stade Mohamed V, Casablanca
Referee: Mohamed Benouza (Algeria)

Raja Casablanca won 3–1 on aggregate.

12 February 2013
14:00

Al-Baqa'a (Jordan)	1–6	(Algeria) USM Alger
Al Rifai 40'		5', 7', 11' Djediat; 19', 90' Hanifi; 59' Chafaï

Amman International Stadium, Amman
Referee: Ali Shaban (Kuwait)
26 February 2013
15:00

USM Alger (Algeria)	3–2	(Jordan) Al-Baqa'a
Gasmi 14'; Mokhtari 70'; Feham 90+1'		72' A. Adous; 86' L. Adous

Stade Omar Hamadi, Algiers
Referee: El Fadil Mohamed (Sudan)

USM Alger won 9–3 on aggregate.

12 February 2013
15:00

CR Belouizdad (Algeria)	1–1	(Egypt) Ismaily SC
Slimani 56'		53' Gamal

Stade 20 Août 1955, Algiers
Attendance: 15,000
Referee: Khalid Ennouni (Morocco)
27 February 2013
16:00

Ismaily SC (Egypt)	1–1 (a.e.t.)	(Algeria) CR Belouizdad
Al-Sulaya 18'		43' Slimani
Penalties
Khairy (penalty scored); Al-Sulaya (penalty scored); Abdelfadil (penalty scored); Antwi (penalty scored)	4–1	(penalty scored) Slimani; (penalty missed) Ammour; (penalty missed) Rebih

30 June Stadium, Cairo
Referee: Abdullah Al-Hilali (Oman)

Ismaily SC won 4–1 on penalties.

13 February 2013
14:00

Al-Nassr (Saudi Arabia)	3–2	(Kuwait) Al-Arabi
Bastos 16'; Abd Rabo 65' (pen.); Al-Sahlawi 90+5'		18' Hayel; 34' Al-Moussawi

Faisal bin Fahd Stadium, Riyadh
Referee: Mohamed Abdelkarim Al Zarouni (United Arab Emirates)
27 February 2013
17:00

Al-Arabi (Kuwait)	2–0	(Saudi Arabia) Al-Nassr
Al Rashidi 38'; Al-Moussawi 49'

Sabah Al-Salem Stadium, Al-Mansouriah (Kuwait City)
Referee: Farouk Mahmoud (Egypt)

Al-Arabi won 4–3 on aggregate.

== Semi-finals ==
Team 1	Agg.	Team 2	1st leg	2nd leg
USM Alger (Algeria)	0–0 (4–3 p)	(Egypt) Ismaily SC	0–0	0–0 (a.e.t.)
Al-Arabi (Kuwait)	3–3 (a)	(Morocco) Raja Casablanca	1–1	2–2

12 March 2013
16:00

USM Alger (Algeria)	0–0	(Egypt) Ismaily SC

Stade Omar Hamadi, Algiers
Referee: Youssef Essrayri (Tunisia)
2 April 2013
17:00

Ismaily SC (Egypt)	0–0 (a.e.t.)	(Algeria) USM Alger
Penalties
Khairy (penalty missed); Al-Sulaya (penalty scored); El-Mohamady (penalty missed); Antwi (penalty scored); Metwaly (penalty scored)	3–4	(penalty scored) Tedjar; (penalty scored) Bouchema; (penalty scored) Meftah; (penalty missed) Daham; (penalty scored) Benmoussa

Air Defense Stadium, Cairo
Referee: Abdulrahman Mohamed Abdou (Qatar)

USM Alger won 4–3 on penalties.

12 March 2013
18:00

Al-Arabi (Kuwait)	1–1	(Morocco) Raja Casablanca
Fall 62'		81' Hafidi

Sabah Al-Salem Stadium, Al-Mansouriah (Kuwait City)
Referee: Adham Makhadmeh (Jordan)
3 April 2013
20:00

Raja Casablanca (Morocco)	2–2	(Kuwait) Al-Arabi
Moutouali 68' (pen.), 72'		89' Adnan; 90' Fall

Stade El Abdi, El Jadida
Referee: Abdulrahman Al-Amri (Saudi Arabia)

On aggregate 3–3. Al-Arabi won on away goals rule.

== Final ==
Team 1	Agg.	Team 2	1st leg	2nd leg
Al-Arabi (Kuwait)	2–3	(Algeria) USM Alger	0–0	2–3

24 April 2013
17:00

Al-Arabi (Kuwait)	0–0	(Algeria) USM Alger

Sabah Al-Salem Stadium, Al-Mansouriah (Kuwait City)
Attendance: 23,456
Referee: Mohammad Arafah (Jordan)
14 May 2013
17:30

USM Alger (Algeria)	3–2	(Kuwait) Al-Arabi
Daham 12'; Djediat 36'; Meftah 75' (pen.)		57' Fall; 61' Al-Moussawi

Stade 5 Juillet 1962, Algiers
Attendance: 50,000
Referee: Khalil Jalal (Saudi Arabia)

USM Alger won 3–2 on aggregate.
