= Sitt =

Sitt may refer to:

- Gann Academy, coeducational Jewish high school located in Waltham, Massachusetts
- Hans Sitt (1850–1922), Bohemian violinist and composer.
- Joseph Sitt (born 1964), American real estate investor
- Peter Sitt (1969), German swimmer
- SITT Daallo, Somali football club based in Mogadishu, Somalia
