= Yacouba Ali =

Nigerien footballer

Seydou Ali Yacouba
Personal information
- Date of birth: 6 April 1992 (age 34)
- Place of birth: Niamey, Niger
- Position: Striker

Team information
- Current team: AS Police (Niamey)
- Number: 5

Senior career*
Years	Team	Apps	(Gls)
2004–2010	AS Police		
2010–2013	Africa Sports National		
2013–2013	USM Alger	1	(0)
2014–	AS Police (Niamey)		

International career^{‡}
2012–	Niger	5	(1)
- * Club domestic league appearances and goals as of January 14, 2013 ‡ National team caps and goals as of 16:33, 15 June 2013 (UTC)

Seydou Ali Yacouba (born April 6, 1992, in Niamey, Niger) is a Nigerien football player who plays for USM Alger and the Niger national football team.

== Career ==
Born in Niamey, Yacouba began playing as a striker with local side AS Police and the Niger youth national teams. At age 18, he moved to Côte d'Ivoire to join Africa Sports National. At age 20, he moved to Algeria to join USM Alger

=== USM Alger ===
On January 12, 2013, it was announced that Yacouba would join USM Alger on a 2.5-year contract. .

== International career ==
He is a member of the Niger national football team, for which he has played since 2012. He played in the 2012 African Nations Cup, mostly as a right back, was called up to play at the 2012 Africa Cup of Nations. His team was eliminated after the group stage.

=== International goals ===
Scores and results list Niger's goal tally first.

No	Date	Venue	Opponent	Score	Result	Competition
1.	15 June 2013	Stade de Franceville, Franceville, Gabon	Gabon	1–0	1–4	2014 FIFA World Cup qualification

== Honours ==
- USM Alger
  - Algerian Cup
    - Winner: 2012–13
