= Mubarak Al-Asmari =

Saudi Arabian footballer

Personal information
- Full name: Mubarak Al-Asmari
- Date of birth: 25 June 1987 (age 39)
- Place of birth: Mecca, Saudi Arabia
- Height: 1.78 m (5 ft 10 in)
- Position: Midfielder

Team information
- Current team: Al-Entesar
- Number: 8

Youth career
- Al-Wehda

Senior career*
Years	Team	Apps	(Gls)
2007–2008	Al-Wehda		
2008–2009	Al-Faisaly		
2009–2012	Al-Qadisiyah	43	(4)
2012–2016	Al-Fateh	74	(1)
2018	Al-Nahda		
2018–2020	Al-Jabalain	52	(3)
2020–2021	Al-Adalah	25	(1)
2021–2022	Bisha	29	(0)
2022–2023	Al-Zulfi		
2023–2024	Al-Jeel		
2024–	Al-Entesar		
- * Club domestic league appearances and goals

Mubarak Al-Amsari (Arabic: مبارك الأسمري; born 25 June 1987) is a Saudi Arabian football player who plays as a midfielder for Al-Entesar.
