= Adnan Adous =

Jordanian footballer

Personal information
- Full name: Adnan Suleiman Hassan Adous
- Date of birth: September 26, 1987 (age 39)
- Place of birth: Amman, Jordan
- Height: 1.68 m (5 ft 6 in)
- Position: Left midfielder

Senior career*
Years	Team	Apps	(Gls)
2006–2014	Al-Baqa'a		
2014–2015	Al-Wehdat		
2015–2018	Al-Baqa'a		
2018	Al-Ramtha		
2018–2023	Al-Baqa'a		

International career^{‡}
2006–2007	Jordan U-20		(1)
2009-2015	Jordan	33	(1)
- * Club domestic league appearances and goals as of 7 August 2014 ‡ National team caps and goals as of 8 November 2026

Adnan Suleiman Hassan Adous (Arabic: عدنان سليمان حسن عدوس) is a retired Jordanian footballer.

== International goals ==
=== With U-20 ===
#	Date	Venue	Opponent	Score	Result	Competition
1	February 6, 2006	Amman	Qatar	4-1	Win	2006 AFC Youth Championship qualification

=== With Senior ===
Scores and results list Jordan's goal tally first.

#	Date	Venue	Opponent	Score	Result	Competition
1.	9 October 2013	King Abdullah II Stadium, Amman, Jordan	Kuwait	1–0	1–1	Friendly

== Honors and Participation in International Tournaments ==
=== In WAFF Championships ===
- 2012 WAFF Championship
- 2014 WAFF Championship
