= Wael Al Rifai =

Syrian footballer (born 1990)

Personal information
- Full name: Mohamad Wael Al Rifai
- Date of birth: 25 November 1990 (age 35)
- Place of birth: Homs, Syria
- Height: 1.72 m (5 ft 7 1/2 in)
- Positions: Attacking midfielder; winger

Team information
- Current team: Al-Jazeera

Senior career*
Years	Team	Apps	(Gls)
2009–2012	Al-Wathba		
2012–2014	Al-Baqa'a	44	(5)
2014–2016	Al-Ahli	9	(1)
2016–2017	Al-Jazeera		
2017–2018	Al-Muharraq		
2018–	Al-Jazeera		

International career^{‡}
2010–2012	Syria U-23		
2017–	Syria	2	(0)
- * Club domestic league appearances and goals ‡ National team caps and goals as of 7 June 2017

Mohamad Wael Al Rifai (Arabic: محمد وائل الرفاعي) (born 25 November 1990 in Homs, Syria) is a Syrian footballer. He currently plays for Al-Jazeera, which competes in the Jordan Premier League the top division in Jordan.
