= Salim Hanifi =

Algerian footballer (born 1988)

Personal information
- Full name: Salim Hanifi
- Date of birth: April 11, 1988 (age 38)
- Place of birth: Sidi Aïch, Algeria
- Position: Forward

Team information
- Current team: CR Belouizdad
- Number: 19

Senior career*
Years	Team	Apps	(Gls)
2008–2011	RC Kouba	-	(-)
2011–2013	JS Kabylie	35	(10)
2013	USM Alger	6	(0)
2013–	CR Belouizdad	4	(2)
- * Club domestic league appearances and goals as of 00:00, September 21, 2013 (UTC)

Salim Hanifi (born 11 April 1988 in Algeria) is an Algerian professional footballer. He currently plays for CR Belouizdad in the Algerian Ligue Professionnelle 1.

== Personal ==
Hanifi is originally from the town of Sidi Aïch.

== Club career ==
On June 12, 2011, Hanifi signed a two-year contract with JS Kabylie. On July 16, 2011, he made his debut for the club as an 83rd-minute substitute in a 2011 CAF Confederation Cup group stage match against MAS Fez of Morocco. On July 30, 2011, he scored his first goal for the club, in the second group stage match against Sunshine Stars of Nigeria.

== Honours ==
- Top scorer of the 2010–11 Algerian Ligue Professionnelle 2 with RC Kouba with 20 goals
