= Ahmed Khairy (footballer) =

Egyptian footballer (born 1987)

Personal information
- Full name: Ahmed Khairy
- Date of birth: 1 October 1987 (age 39)
- Place of birth: Cairo, Egypt
- Height: 1.83 m (6 ft 0 in)
- Position: Midfielder

Team information
- Current team: El Mokawloon

Youth career
- 1997–2007: Al-Ismaily

Senior career*
Years	Team	Apps	(Gls)
2006–2013	Al-Ismaily	76	(5)
2013–2015	Al Ahly		
2015–2017	El Mokawloon		
2017–2018	El Entag El Harby		
2018–	Baladeyet El Mahalla SC		

International career
2009–2012	Egypt	11	(3)
- * Club domestic league appearances and goals as of 1 January 2014

Ahmed Khairy (Arabic: أحمد خيري; born 1 October 1987) was an Egyptian footballer.

== Career ==
Khairy played for the Egyptian giant Al Ahly. He moved to Al Ahly in 2013's summer transfer window from Egyptian rivals Ismaily, and is a member of the Egypt national football team. He can play across the entire midfield or as a defender.

Khairy was the youngest member of the Egypt national football squad at the 2009 FIFA Confederations Cup in South Africa.

== International goals ==
#	Date	Venue	Opponent	Score	Result	Competition
1.	27 February 2012	Al-Gharafa Stadium, Doha, Qatar	Kenya	4–0	5–0	Friendly
2.	31 March 2012	Al Merreikh Stadium, Omdurman, Sudan	Chad	2-0	4-0	Friendly
3.	11 May 2012	Rashid Karami Stadium, Tripoli, Lebanon	Lebanon	4-0	4-1	Friendly
