= Kader Fall =

Senegalese footballer

Personal information
- Full name: Abdou Kader Fall
- Date of birth: 25 December 1986 (age 39)
- Place of birth: Dakar, Senegal
- Position: Forward

Senior career*
Years	Team	Apps	(Gls)
2009–2011	MAS Fez		
2011–2014	Al Arabi SC		
2015	Berkane		
2016	Muscat		
2016	Al Fahaheel		
2016–2018	Muscat		
2018	Fanja		
2018–2019	Muscat		
- * Club domestic league appearances and goals

Abdou Kader Fall (born 25 December 1986) is a Senegalese former professional footballer who played as a forward.
