= 2014–15 USM Alger season =

USM Alger
2014–15 season
- Chairman: Ali Haddad
- Head coach: Hubert Velud (until 5 February 2015); Billel Dziri (c) (from 1 February 2015) (until 18 February 2015); Otto Pfister (from 19 February 2015) (until 18 May 2015); Mounir Zeghdoud (c); Mahieddine Meftah (c) (from 19 May 2015)
- Stadium: Stade Omar Hammadi
- Ligue 1: 8th
- Algerian Cup: Round of 16
- Super Cup: Runners–up
- Champions League: Group stage
- Top goalscorer: League: Youcef Belaïli (6 goals); All: Youcef Belaïli (8 goals)
Home colours	Away colours	Third colours

In the 2014–15 season, USM Alger competed in the Ligue 1 for the 37th season, as well as the Algerian Cup. It was their 20th consecutive season in the top flight of Algerian football. The club also competed in the CAF Champions League, the Algerian Super Cup and the Algerian Cup. The club was managed by Hubert Velud, until his sacking on 1 February 2015. He was replaced by Otto Pfister on 19 February. On May 18, Pfister was sacked as coach of USM Alger.

== Squad list ==
Players and squad numbers last updated on 29 May 2015.
Note: Flags indicate national team as has been defined under FIFA eligibility rules. Players may hold more than one non-FIFA nationality.

No.	Nat.	Position	Name	Date of Birth (Age)	Signed from	Apps.	Goals	Signed in	Contract ends	Transfer fees
Goalkeepers
1	(Algeria)	GK	Mohamed Lamine Zemmamouche	19 March 1985 (aged 29)	(Algeria) MC Alger	246	0	2012	2015	Free transfer
16	(Algeria)	GK	Abdenour Merzouki	15 February 1992 (aged 22)	(Algeria) MC Mekhadma	0	0	2014	2016	Free transfer
27	(Algeria)	GK	Mourad Berrefane	18 March 1986 (aged 28)	(Algeria) MO Béjaïa	9	0	2014	2016	Free transfer
Defenders
3	(Algeria)	CB / LB	Ayoub Abdellaoui	16 February 1993 (aged 21)	(Algeria) Reserve team	10	0	2011	2016	Youth system
4	(Algeria)	CB / RB	Abdelkader Laïfaoui	9 July 1981 (aged 33)	(Algeria) ES Sétif	78	5	2011	2015	Free transfer
6	(Algeria)	CB	Farouk Chafaï	23 June 1990 (aged 24)	(Algeria) Reserve team	124	8	2010	2016	Youth system
20	(Algeria)	CB	Nacereddine Khoualed (C)	16 April 1986 (aged 28)	(Algeria) US Biskra	243	7	2006	2018	Free transfer
25	(Algeria)	LB / LM / LW	Mokhtar Benmoussa	1 August 1986 (aged 28)	(Algeria) ES Sétif	100	7	2012	2016	Free transfer
26	(Algeria)	LB	Brahim Boudebouda	28 August 1990 (aged 24)	(France) Le Mans FC	80	8	2012	2016	Free transfer
30	(Algeria)	RB	Mohamed Rabie Meftah	5 May 1985 (aged 29)	(Algeria) JSM Béjaïa	112	16	2012	2017	Free transfer
Midfielders
5	(Algeria)	AM	Abderrahmane Bourdim	14 June 1994 (aged 20)	(Algeria) Reserve team	3	0	2014	2019	Youth system
7	(Algeria)	RW / AM	Zinedine Ferhat	1 March 1993 (aged 21)	(Algeria) Reserve team	109	8	2011	2016	Youth system
10	(Algeria)	LW / RW / AM	Youcef Belaïli	27 January 1992 (aged 22)	(Tunisia) Espérance de Tunis	32	8	2014	2016	Free transfer
11	(Algeria)	DM	Hocine El Orfi	27 January 1987 (aged 27)	(Algeria) Paradou AC	63	0	2012	2016	Free transfer
13	(Algeria)	CM / DM	Nassim Bouchema	5 May 1988 (aged 26)	(Algeria) MC Alger	124	6	2011	2015	Free transfer
15	(Algeria)	AM	Bouazza Feham	11 April 1986 (aged 28)	(Algeria) ES Sétif	114	10	2011	2015	Free transfer
23	(Algeria)	DM / RM	Hamza Koudri	15 December 1987 (aged 27)	(Algeria) MC Alger	91	3	2012	2017	Free transfer
24	(Algeria)	DM	Mohammed Benkhemassa	28 June 1993 (aged 21)	(Algeria) Reserve team	17	1	2011	2016	Youth system
28	(Algeria)	AM	Karim Baïteche	10 July 1991 (aged 23)	(Algeria) Reserve team	41	3	2010	2017	Youth system
8	(Algeria)	AM	Kaddour Beldjilali	28 November 1988 (aged 26)	(Tunisia) Étoile du Sahel	10	2	2014	2017	400,000 €
Forwards
19	(Cameroon)		Ernest Nsombo	6 March 1991 (aged 23)	(Cameroon) Astres FC	11	2			
9	(Madagascar)	CF	Carolus Andriamatsinoro	6 September 1989 (aged 25)	(Algeria) Paradou AC	68	11	2012	2017	
14	(Algeria)	ST	Rachid Nadji	15 April 1989 (aged 25)	(Algeria) ES Sétif	26	5	2014	2016	Free transfer
18	(Algeria)	CF / RW / LW	Mohamed Seguer	19 January 1985 (aged 29)	(Algeria) ASO Chlef	61	8	2012	2016	Free transfer
21	(Cameroon)		Rostand Kako	22 March 1990 (aged 24)	(Cameroon) Coton Sport FC	2	0	2014	2017	50,000 €
33	(Algeria)		Abderrahmane Meziane	7 March 1994 (aged 20)	(Algeria) Reserve team	9	1	2014	2019	Youth system
12	(Ivory Coast)		Manucho	3 October 1990 (aged 24)	(Estonia) FC Infonet	12	2	2014	2017	Free transfer

== Transfers ==
=== In ===
Date	Pos	Player	From club	Transfer fee	Source
3 June 2014	GK	(Algeria) Abdenour Merzouki	MC Mekhadma	Free transfer	
5 June 2014	MF	(Algeria) Mohammed Benkhemassa	Reserve team	First Professional Contract	
5 June 2014	GK	(Algeria) Mourad Berrefane	MO Béjaïa	Free transfer	
5 June 2014	DF	(Algeria) Ayoub Abdellaoui	Reserve team	First Professional Contract	
5 June 2014	FW	(Algeria) Abderrahmane Meziane	Reserve team	First Professional Contract	
5 June 2014	MF	(Algeria) Abderrahmane Bourdim	Reserve team	First Professional Contract	
8 June 2014	DF	(Algeria) (France) Salim Laassami	(France) GS Consolat	Free transfer	
9 June 2014	MF	(Algeria) (France) Akim Orinel	(France) Saint-Raphaël	Free transfer	
12 June 2014	MF	(Algeria) Youcef Belaïli	(Tunisia) ES Tunis	Free transfer	
13 June 2014	FW	(Algeria) Rachid Nadji	ES Sétif	Free transfer	
13 July 2014	MF	(Algeria) (France) Noui Laïfa	(France) Paris FC	Free transfer	
26 December 2014	FW	(Cameroon) Rostand Kako	(Cameroon) Cotonsport Garoua	50,000 €	
7 January 2015	MF	(Algeria) Kaddour Beldjilali	(Tunisia) Étoile du Sahel	400,000 €	
7 January 2015	FW	(Ivory Coast) Manucho	(Estonia) FC Infonet	Free transfer	
15 January 2015	GK	(Algeria) (Sweden) Hossin Lagoun	(Italy) Terracina	Free transfer	

=== Out ===
Date	Pos	Player	To club	Transfer fee	Source
30 May 2014	MF	(Algeria) Djamel Rabti	CA Bordj Bou Arreridj	Free transfer	
24 June 2014	FW	(Algeria) Samy Frioui	USM El Harrach	Loan	
30 June 2014	MF	(Algeria) Lamouri Djediat	CR Belouizdad	End of contract	
28 May 2014	DF	(Algeria) Youcef Benamara	JS Kabylie	End of contract	
1 June 2014	GK	(Algeria) Rafik Mazouzi	RC Arbaâ	Loan	USMA.dz
14 July 2014	FW	(Algeria) Ahmed Gasmi	ES Sétif	End of contract	
14 July 2014	FW	(Algeria) Abdelmalek Ziaya	ES Sétif	Free transfer	
12 July 2014	FW	(Algeria) Djamel Eddine Chatal	MO Béjaïa	Loan for two years	
14 July 2014	DF	(Algeria) Ibrahim Bekakchi	CA Bordj Bou Arreridj	Loan	
1 December 2014	MF	(Algeria) (France) Noui Laïfa	(France) SR Colmar	Free transfer	
31 December 2014	DF	(Algeria) (France) Salim Laassami	(France) GS Consolat	Free transfer	
12 January 2015	FW	(Cameroon) Ernest Nsombo	(Tunisia) AS Marsa	Loan	
16 January 2015	DF	(Algeria) Mohamed Amrane	ESM Koléa	Loan for six months	
18 January 2015	MF	(Algeria) (France) Akim Orinel	(France) Saint-Raphaël	Free transfer	

== Pre-season and friendlies ==
12 July 2014 Friendly	USM Alger (Algeria)	6–0	(Turkey) Şişli Anadolu SK	Istanbul
23:00	Feham 15' (fk.); Nadji 22', 25'; Seguer 59', 70'; Nsombo 72'	Report		Stadium: Stade Maltepe

15 July 2014 Friendly	USM Alger (Algeria)	3–2	(Iran) Esteghlal F.C.	Istanbul
22:30	Meftah 8' (pen.); Nadji 28'; Bourdim 77'	Report		Stadium: Stade Maltepe

18 July 2014 Friendly	USM Alger (Algeria)	2–1	(Iran) Esteghlal Ahvaz F.C.	Istanbul
23:00	Bourdim 9'; Nsombo 85'	Report		Stadium: Stade Maltepe

20 July 2014 Friendly	USM Alger (Algeria)	2–1	(Jordan) Al-Wehdat SC	Istanbul
23:00	Nsombo 77', 79'	Report		Stadium: Stade Maltepe

25 July 2014 Friendly	USM Alger (Algeria)	2–0	(Algeria) USM Blida	Bologhine
23:30	Belaïli 50', 55'			Stadium: Stade Omar Hammadi

26 July 2014 Friendly	USM Alger (Algeria)	4–0	(Algeria) ESM Kolea	Bologhine
23:00	Nadji 6'; Andria 18'; Boudebouda 33'; Seguer 86'	Report		Stadium: Stade Omar Hammadi

3 August 2014 Friendly	USM Alger (Algeria)	0–1	(Algeria) JSM Béjaïa	Bologhine
10:30		Report		Stadium: Stade Omar Hammadi

3 August 2014 Friendly	USM Alger (Algeria)	2–1	(Algeria) RC Arbaâ	Bologhine
18:00	Nadji 57'; Ferhat 59'	Report	70' Darfalou	Stadium: Stade Omar Hammadi

10 January 2015 Friendly	Club Africain (Tunisia)	0–0	(Algeria) USM Alger	Tunis, Tunisia
13:30		Report		Stadium: Stade Chedli Zouiten

13 January 2015 Friendly	AS Marsa (Tunisia)	2–6	(Algeria) USM Alger	Tunis, Tunisia
20:00	Goal	Report	Manucho; Seguer; Andria; Amrane	Stadium: Stade annexe de Radès

== Competitions ==
=== Overview ===
Competition	Record								Started round	Final position / round	First match	Last match
Competition	G	W	D	L	GF	GA	GD	Win %	Started round	Final position / round	First match	Last match
Ligue 1	30	10	11	9	35	27	+8	33.33	—N/a	8th	16 August 2014	29 May 2015
Algerian Cup	3	2	1	0	7	2	+5	66.67	Round of 64	Round of 16	13 December 2014	10 March 2015
Champions League	6	3	2	1	13	7	+6	50.00	Preliminary round	Group stage	15 February 2015	3 May 2015
Algerian Super Cup	1	0	0	1	0	1	−1	0.00	Final	Runners–up	9 August 2014	
Total	40	15	14	11	55	37	+18	37.50				

=== Ligue 1 ===
==== League table ====
Pos	Team	Pld	W	D	L	GF	GA	GD	Pts
6	CR Belouizdad	30	11	9	10	27	34	−7	42 (Note: CSC 3-1 CRB; CRB 1-1 CSC)
7	ASM Oran	30	11	8	11	33	37	−4	41 (Note: USMA 1-2 ASMO; ASMO 1-0 USMA)
8	USM Alger	30	10	11	9	35	27	+8	41
9	NA Hussein Dey	30	10	10	10	23	22	+1	40 (Note: NAHD 3-0 RCA; RCA 0-1 NAHD)
10	RC Arbaâ	30	12	4	14	28	35	−7	40

Updated to match(es) played on 29 May 2015. Source: DZFoot
Rules for classification: 1) points; 2) head-to-head points; 3) head-to-head goal difference; 4) goal difference; 5) total goals; 6) fairplay ranking; 7) playoff

==== Results summary ====
Overall								Home						Away					
Pld	W	D	L	GF	GA	GD	Pts	W	D	L	GF	GA	GD	W	D	L	GF	GA	GD
30	10	11	9	35	27	+8	41	6	7	2	23	11	+12	4	4	7	12	16	−4

Last updated: 29 May 2015.
Source: Competitive matches

==== Results by round ====
Round	1	2	3	4	5	6	7	8	9	10	11	12	13	14	15	16	17	18	19	20	21	22	23	24	25	26	27	28	29	30
Ground	H	A	H	A	H	A	H	H	A	H	A	H	A	H	A	A	H	A	H	A	H	A	A	H	A	H	A	H	A	H
Result	D	W	W	L	L	L	D	D	W	W	W	W	W	L	D	L	D	L	W	D	W	D	D	D	L	D	L	D	L	W
Position	8	4	2	4	7	11	11	13	8	5	3	3	1	3	2	4	5	8	4	5	3	3	3	3	4	7	8	8	11	8

Updated to match(es) played on 29 May 2015. Source: Competitive matches
A = Away; H = Home; W = Win; D = Draw; L = Loss

==== Matches ====
Win Draw Loss

16 August 2014 Round 1	USM Alger	1–1	ES Sétif	Bologhine
19:00	Meftah 47' (pen.); Chafaï (yellow card) 34'; Belaïli (yellow card) 90+1'	Soccerway report Live TV: TV Tamazight 4	15' (pen.) Djahnit; (yellow card) 28' Demmou; (yellow card) 40' Megatli; (yellow card) 90+5' Ziaya	Stadium: Stade Omar Hammadi; Attendance: 7.000; Referee: Saïdi, Bechirene, Rezgane

23 August 2014 Round 2	JS Kabylie	1–2	USM Alger	Tizi Ouzou
19:00	Ebossé 27' (pen.); Mekkaoui (yellow card) 5'; Benlamari (yellow card) 44'	Soccerway report Live TV: TV Tamazight 4 / beIN Sports	7' (FK.) Benmoussa; 83' Belaïli; (yellow card) 11' Bouchema; (yellow card) 22' (yellow-red card) 24' Benmoussa	Stadium: Stade 1er Novembre 1954; Attendance: 20.000; Referee: Mohamed Benouza, Ayad, Oumari

13 September 2014 Round 3	USM Alger	2–0	CR Belouizdad	Bologhine
17:45	Meftah 50' (pen.); Nadji 75'; Koudri (yellow card) 57'; Boudebouda (yellow card) 66'; Khoualed (yellow card) 87'	Soccerway report Live TV: Algérie 3	(yellow card) 25' Djediat; (yellow card) 45' Sidhoum; (yellow card) 47' Cheurfaoui	Stadium: Omar Hamadi Stadium; Attendance: 6.000; Referee: Arab, Boulfelfel, Ait Amar

20 September 2014 Round 4	RC Arbaâ	2–0	USM Alger	Larbaâ
16:00	Mokdad 5' (pen.); Darfalou (yellow card) 44' (goal) 90+3'; Ali Guechi (yellow card) 13'; Ferhani (yellow card) 19'; Yettou (yellow card) 34'; Zeddam (yellow card) 60'; Fellah (yellow card) 66' (yellow-red card) 90+5'	Soccerway report Live TV: None	(yellow card) 3' Meftah; (yellow card) 34' Khoualed; (yellow card) 55' Bouchema	Stadium: Stade Ismaïl Makhlouf; Attendance: 10.000; Referee: Benbrahem, Djabellah, Allaoua

27 September 2014 Round 5	USM Alger	0–1	USM El Harrach	Bologhine
17:45	Khoualed (yellow card) 20'; Bouchema (yellow card) 30'; Koudri (yellow card) 44'; Belaïli (red card) 80'	Soccerway report Live TV: Algérie 3 / beIN Sports	57' Aït Ouamar; (yellow card) 36' Mazari; (yellow card) 83' Benachour	Stadium: Omar Hamadi Stadium; Attendance: 5.000; Referee: Achouri, Amri, Bougherara

2 October 2014 Round 6	CS Constantine	2–1	USM Alger	Constantine
19:00	Allag 13'; Remache 79'; Boulemdaïs (yellow card) 73'; Hadji (yellow card) 75'	Soccerway report Live TV: TV Tamazight 4 / beIN Sports	(yellow card) 29' (goal) 90+5' Seguer	Stadium: Stade Mohamed Hamlaoui; Attendance: 20.000; Referee: Ghorbal, Cherchar, Seradj

18 October 2014 Round 7	USM Alger	1–1	MC Oran	Bologhine
19:00	Meftah 17'; Seguer (yellow card) 39'; Chafaï (yellow card) 89'	Soccerway report Live TV: None	89' (pen.) Bezzaz; (yellow card) 41' Merbah; (yellow card) 54' Nessakh	Stadium: Omar Hamadi Stadium; Attendance: 10.000; Referee: Zouaoui, Bahatte, Benrouane

24 October 2014 Round 8	USM Alger	0–0	NA Hussein Dey	Bologhine
17:00	Bouchema (yellow card) 29'	Soccerway report Live TV: Algérie 3	(yellow card) 7' Bendebka; (yellow card) 71' Allali; (yellow card) 77' Ghalem; (yellow card) 46' (yellow-red card) 79' Benyahia	Stadium: Omar Hamadi Stadium; Attendance: 5.000; Referee: Abssiri, Hallem, Bourechou

1 November 2014 Round 9	MC El Eulma	1–2	USM Alger	El Eulma
16:00	Hamiti 33'; Belkhiter (yellow card) 44'; Maïza (yellow card) 57' (yellow-red card) 70'; Namane (yellow card) 90'	Soccerway report Live TV: None	27' Koudri; 66' Belaïli; (yellow card) 20' Meftah; (yellow card) 23' Laïfaoui; (yellow card) 73' Khoualed	Stadium: Stade Messaoud Zougar; Attendance: 0 (close doors); Referee: Bachir, Etchiali, Hadj Saïd

7 November 2014 Round 10	USM Alger	2–0	USM Bel-Abbès	Bologhine
19:00	Boudebouda 13', 71'; Benkhemassa (yellow card) 15'; Ferhat (yellow card) 90+4'	Soccerway report Live TV: None	(yellow card) 35' Abdat; (yellow card) 39' Guerriche; (yellow card) 57' Yaghni	Stadium: Omar Hamadi Stadium; Attendance: 12.000; Referee: Aouina, Benaïssa, Chenaoua, Sekhraoui

22 November 2014 Round 11	MC Alger	0–1	USM Alger	Bologhine
18:00	Azzi (yellow card) 15'	Soccerway report Live TV: None	47' Baïteche; (yellow card) 76' Meftah	Stadium: Omar Hamadi Stadium; Attendance: 0 (close doors); Referee: Benouza, Omari, Ayad

29 November 2014 Round 12	USM Alger	3–1	JS Saoura	Bologhine
18:00	Baïteche 46'; Nadji 48' (yellow card) 67'; Meziane 90+3'; Koudri (yellow card) 62'	Soccerway report Live TV: None	76' Hammia; (yellow card) 31' El Amali; (yellow card) 74' Aoudou	Stadium: Omar Hamadi Stadium; Attendance: 14.000; Referee: Abid Charef, Boulfelfel, Tamen

6 December 2014 Round 13	MO Béjaïa	0–1	USM Alger	Béjaïa
16:00	Benali (yellow card) 37'; Sidibé (yellow card) 76'; Rahal (yellow card) 73'; Dehouche (yellow card) 79'	Soccerway report Live TV: Algérie 3 / Canal Algérie	35' Meftah; (yellow card) 6' Benkhemassa; (yellow card) 17' Laïfaoui; (yellow card) 33' Belaïli; (yellow card) 88' Chafaï	Stadium: Stade de l'Unité Maghrébine; Attendance: 25.000; Referee: Arab, Bazzine, Bioud

19 December 2014 Round 14	USM Alger	1–2	ASM Oran	Bologhine
16:00	Andria 63'; Feham (yellow card) 21'; Benkhemassa (yellow card) 54'; Meftah (yellow card) 59'	Soccerway report Live TV: TV Tamazight 4 / ENTV Terrestre	57' (yellow card) 78' Djemaouni; 61' Benkablia; (yellow card) 45' Boudoumi; (yellow card) 79' Bouhadda	Stadium: Omar Hamadi Stadium; Attendance: 13.000; Referee: Benbrahem, Allaoua, Cheballah

30 December 2014 Round 15	ASO Chlef	0–0	USM Alger	Chlef
15:00	Cherchar (yellow card) 11'; Zaoui (yellow card) 17'; Boulahia (yellow card) 52'	Soccerway report Live TV: None	(yellow card) 30' Chafaï; (yellow card) 35' Koudri	Stadium: Stade Mohamed Boumezrag; Referee: Necib, Maghlout, Bennacer

20 January 2015 Round 16	ES Sétif	3–2	USM Alger	Sétif
18:00	Dagoulou 26', 52'; Ziaya 64' (yellow card) 68' (yellow-red card) 71'; Mellouli (yellow card) 31'; Djahnit (yellow card) 70'	Soccerway report Live TV: TV Tamazight 4 / beIN Sports	43' Boudebouda; 81' Nadji; (yellow card) 33' Bouchema; (yellow card) 60' Laïfaoui; (yellow card) 65' Koudri	Stadium: Stade 8 Mai 1945; Attendance: 12.000; Referee: Gherbal, Serradj, Cherchar

24 January 2015 Round 17	USM Alger	1–1	JS Kabylie	Bologhine
16:00	Boudebouda 45+1'; Nadji (yellow card) 20'; Bouchema (yellow card) 50'; Meftah (yellow card) 81'; Belaïli (yellow card) 90+4'	Soccerway report Live TV: Algérie 3	81' (pen.) Rial; (yellow card) 55' Benamara; (yellow card) 67' Benlamri	Stadium: Omar Hamadi Stadium; Attendance: 10.000; Referee: Aouina, Benaïssa, Chenaoua

30 January 2015 Round 18	CR Belouizdad	2–1	USM Alger	Algiers
16:00	Cheurfaoui 21'; Djediat 67'; Derrag (yellow card) 15'; Chebira (yellow card) 37' (yellow-red card) 56'; Nemdil (yellow card) 52'	Soccerway report Live TV: TV Tamazight 4	87' Belaïli; (yellow card) 22' Boudebouda; (yellow card) 70' Bouchema; (yellow card) 74' Berrefane; (yellow card) 77' Ferhat	Stadium: Stade 20 Août 1955; Attendance: 15.000; Referee: Amalou, Salaouadji, Bourouba

6 February 2015 Round 19	USM Alger	5–1	RC Arbaâ	Bologhine
16:00	Belaïli 3'; Meftah (yellow card) 18' (goal) 23' (pen.); Ferhat 77' (pen.); Benkhemassa (yellow card) 82' (goal) 84'; Manucho 90+1'; El Orfi (yellow card) 90+3'	Soccerway report Live TV: Canal Algérie	51' Harrouche; (yellow card) 21' Zaâlani; (yellow card) 33' Ferhani; (yellow card) 67' (yellow-red card) 77' Maarif	Stadium: Omar Hamadi Stadium; Attendance: 7.500; Referee: Zouaoui, Aouina, Kechidi

10 February 2015 Round 20	USM El Harrach	0–0	USM Alger	Algiers
15:00	Keniche (yellow card) 13'; Kara (yellow card) 90+4'	Soccerway report Live TV: None	(yellow card) 58' Belaïli; (yellow card) 60' Benkhemassa; (yellow card) 90+2' Chafaï	Stadium: Stade 1er Novembre 1954; Attendance: 8.000; Referee: Houasnia, Bounoua, Boulkrinet

24 February 2015 Round 21	USM Alger	2–0	CS Constantine	Bologhine
18:00	Benmoussa 30'; Belaïli 32'	Soccerway report Live TV: Canal Algérie	(yellow card) 89' Berthé	Stadium: Omar Hamadi Stadium; Attendance: 6.500

6 March 2015 Round 22	MC Oran	0–0	USM Alger	Oran
15:00	Chérif (yellow card) 29'; Hamdadou (red card) 61'; Bellabès (yellow card) 65'	Soccerway report Live TV: beIN Sports	(yellow card) 69' Laïfaoui; (yellow card) 89' Boudebouda	Stadium: Stade Ahmed Zabana; Attendance: 15.000; Referee: Mial, Semsoum, Idir

21 March 2015 Round 23	NA Hussein Dey	0–0	USM Alger	Algiers
16:00	Ghalem (yellow card) 45+1'	Soccerway report Live TV: None	(yellow card) 43' Chafaï	Stadium: Stade 20 Août 1955; Referee: Benouza, Bechirene, Ladraâ

10 April 2015 Round 24	USM Alger	1–1	MC El Eulma	Bologhine
18:00	Belaïli (yellow card) 5'; Bouchema (yellow card) 33'; Manucho 90+5'; Khoualed (red card) 90+9'	Soccerway report Live TV: None	(yellow card) 6' Bentayeb; 28' (yellow card) 90' Hamiti; (yellow card) 69' Ousserir; (yellow card) 86' Tembeng	Stadium: Omar Hamadi Stadium; Attendance: 18.000; Referee: Ghorbal, Sarradj, Cherchar

14 April 2015 Round 25	USM Bel-Abbès	1–0	USM Alger	Sidi Bel Abbès
17:00	Ghazali 63'; Guerriche (yellow card) 33'; Cherifi (yellow card) 64'	Soccerway report Live TV: None	(yellow card) 35' El Orfi; (yellow card) 58' Benmoussa; (yellow card) 67' Abdellaoui	Stadium: Stade 24 Fevrier 1956; Referee: Necib, Maghlout, Beioud

25 April 2015 Round 26	USM Alger	0–0	MC Alger	Bologhine
17:00	Bouchema (yellow card) 4'; Andria (yellow card) 32'; Meftah (yellow card) 49'; Belaïli (yellow card) 84'	Soccerway report Live TV: None	(yellow card) 18' Djallit; (yellow card) 27' Hendou; (yellow card) 55' Zeghdane	Stadium: Omar Hamadi Stadium; Attendance: 0 (close doors); Referee: Mial, Idir, Semsoum

9 May 2015 Round 27	JS Saoura	3–2	USM Alger	Béchar
17:00	Tiouli 5'; El Amali 63'; Sebie 73' (pen.) (yellow card) 25' (yellow-red card) 90+2'	Soccerway report Live TV: None	9' Bouchema; 70' (o.g.) Bapidi Fils; (yellow card) 45' (yellow-red card) 72' Khoualed	Stadium: Stade 20 Août 1955; Attendance: 0 (close doors); Referee: Benouza, Amari, Ayad

16 May 2015 Round 28	USM Alger	1–1	MO Béjaïa	Bologhine
17:00	Beldjilali 28'; Meftah (yellow card) 31'	Soccerway report Live TV: Canal Algérie / beIN Sports / Al Kass Sports	71' Zerdab; (yellow card) 50' Mebarakou; (yellow card) 80' Yaya; (yellow card) 85' Rahmani	Stadium: Omar Hamadi Stadium; Attendance: 8.000; Referee: Amalou, Bounoua, Azerine

23 May 2015 Round 29	ASM Oran	1–0	USM Alger	Oran
17:00	Herbache 53'; Benkabila (yellow card) 73'; Boudoumi (yellow card) 39' (yellow-red card) 87'; Bentiba (red card) 90'	Soccerway report Live TV: None	(yellow card) 68' Abdellaoui; (yellow card) 82' Belaïli; (yellow card) 90+2' Koudri; (yellow card) 69' (yellow-red card) 90' Ferhat	Stadium: Stade Ahmed Zabana; Referee: Necib, Meghlout, Benaceur

29 May 2015 Round 30	USM Alger	3–1	ASO Chlef	Bologhine
17:00	Belaïli 9'; Feham 22' (pen.); Koudri 45'	Soccerway report Live TV: None	72' Madouni	Stadium: Omar Hamadi Stadium; Attendance: 0 (close doors); Referee: Bichari, Gourari, Salaouadji

=== Algerian Cup ===
13 December 2014 Round of 64	CRB Ouled Abdelkader	1–4	USM Alger	Chlef
14:00	Roudouane 89'; Roudouane (yellow card) 85'	[[[Category:All articles with unsourced statements]] Report] Live TV: None	11' Boudebouda; 49' Andria; 74', 84' Nadji; (yellow card) 90+2' Seguer	Stadium: Stade Mohamed Boumezrag; Referee: Sekhraoui, Hammou, Saïdani

26 December 2014 Round of 32	USM Alger	2–0	USM El Harrach	Bologhine
16:00	Chafaï 40'; Andria 74'; Khoualed (yellow card) 18'; Bouchema (yellow card) 82'; Koudri (yellow card) 86'	[[[Category:All articles with unsourced statements]] Report] Live TV: Canal Algérie	(yellow card) 31' Mazari; (yellow card) 32' Mebarki; (yellow card) 66' Kara; (yellow card) 83' Boumechra; (yellow card) 86' Harrag; (yellow card) 90+1' Ziane Cherif	Stadium: Stade Omar Hammadi; Referee: Bekouassa, Bounoua, Rachedi

10 March 2015 Round of 16	USM Alger	1–1 (a.e.t.) (4–5 p)	ASO Chlef	Bologhine
14:30	Boudebouda 32'; Bouchema (yellow card) 58'; Koudri (yellow card) 101'; Khoualed (yellow card) 113'	[[[Category:All articles with unsourced statements]] Report] Live TV: Canal Algérie	61' Tedjar; (yellow card) 45' Zaoui; (yellow card) 58' Haddouche; (yellow card) 63' (yellow-red card) 96' Badarou	Stadium: Stade Omar Hammadi; Referee: Arab, Bazzine, Biyoud
	Penalties
	Meftah (penalty scored); Belaïli (penalty scored); Boudebouda (penalty scored); Beldjilali (penalty missed); Andria (penalty scored); Benkhemassa (penalty missed)		(penalty missed) Tedjar; (penalty scored) Daham; (penalty scored) Haddouche; (penalty scored) Naamani; (penalty scored) Boulahia; (penalty scored) Hadiouche

=== Algerian Super Cup ===
9 August 2014	USM Alger	0–1	MC Alger	Blida
17:30	(yellow card) 90' Koudri	Report	Aouedj 81'; Azzi (yellow card) 69'; Karaoui (yellow card) 87'	Stadium: Stade Mustapha Tchaker; Attendance: 7.000; Referee: Mehdi Abid Charef

=== Champions League ===
==== Qualifying rounds ====
===== Preliminary round =====
15 February 2015 first leg	USM Alger (Algeria)	3–0	(Chad) Foullah Edifice FC	Algiers
18:00 UTC+1	Chafaï 3'; Belaïli 56' (pen.); Andria 90+6'	Report	(yellow card) 26' Lossou; (yellow card) 23' (yellow-red card) 52' Dillah	Stadium: Omar Hammadi Stadium; Attendance: 7.000; Referee: Wahid Tamuni Salah (Libya)

1 March 2015 Second leg	Foullah Edifice FC (Chad)	3–1 (3–4 agg.)	(Algeria) USM Alger	N'Djamena
14:00 UTC+1	Hilaire 11', 17' (pen.); Boudina 60'; Ngarbe (yellow card) 41'; Tchoumi (yellow card) 58'	Report	7' Laïfaoui; (yellow card) 8' (yellow-red card) 38' Koudri; (yellow card) 23' Manucho; (yellow card) 90+3' Zemmamouche	Stadium: Omnisports Idriss Mahamat Ouya; Attendance: 300; Referee: Ibrahim Mamane (Niger)

===== First round =====
15 March 2015 first leg	USM Alger (Algeria)	5–1	(Senegal) AS Pikine	Algiers, Algeria
18:00 UTC+1	Bouchema 12' (yellow card) 28'; Beldjilali 21'; Meftah 52' (pen.), 81' (yellow card) 83'; Belaïli 69'; Nadji (red card) 55'	Report	9' (yellow card) 26' Niang; (yellow card) 10' Papa Amadou; (yellow card) 33' Mame Bakary; (yellow card) 50' Alassane	Stadium: Omar Hammadi Stadium; Attendance: 10.000; Referee: Mahmoud Zakria El Banna (Egypt)

3 April 2015 Second leg	AS Pikine (Senegal)	1–1 (2–6 agg.)	(Algeria) USM Alger	Dakar
15:30 UTC±0	El Hadi Saw 27'	Report	(yellow card) 2' Bouchema; (yellow card) 35' Chafaï; 78' Koudri	Stadium: Stade Demba Diop; Attendance: 5.000; Referee: Cecil Amatey Fleischer (Ghana)

===== Second round =====
19 April 2015 first leg	USM Alger (Algeria)	2–1	(Guinea) AS Kaloum	Algiers
18:00 UTC+1	Chafaï 45+5'; Benmoussa 59'; Belaïli (yellow card) 37'; Abdellaoui (yellow card) 45+2'; Feham (yellow card) 52'; Meftah (yellow card) 88'	Report	55' Kassongo	Stadium: Omar Hammadi Stadium; Attendance: 8.000; Referee: Juste Zio (Burkina Faso)

3 May 2015 Second leg	AS Kaloum (Guinea)	1–1 (2–3 agg.)	(Algeria) USM Alger	Bamako
16:30 UTC±0	Kassongo 74'	Report	(yellow card) 41' Ferhat; 51' (yellow card) 52' Andria; (yellow card) 73' Zemmamouche	Stadium: Stade Modibo Kéïta; Referee: Mutaz Abdelbasit Abdelbasit Khairalla (Sudan)

Note: The second leg was played outside of Guinea due to Ebola outbreak.

== Squad information ==
=== Appearances and goals ===
No.	Pos	Player	Nat	Ligue 1			Algerian Cup			Super Cup			Champions League			Total		
No.	Pos	Player	Nat	App	St	G	App	St	G	App	St	G	App	St	G	App	St	G
Goalkeepers
1	GK	Lamine Zemmamouche	(Algeria)	24	24	0	2	2	0	1	1	0	6	6	0	33	33	0
16	GK	Abdenour Merzouki	(Algeria)	0	0	0	0	0	0	0	0	0	0	0	0	0	0	0
27	GK	Mourad Berrefane	(Algeria)	7	6	0	1	1	0	0	0	0	1	0	0	9	7	0
Defenders
3	DF	Ayoub Abdellaoui	(Algeria)	5	5	0	0	0	0	0	0	0	4	3	0	9	8	0
4	DF	Abdelkader Laïfaoui	(Algeria)	14	13	0	1	1	0	0	0	0	5	4	1	20	18	1
6	DF	Farouk Chafaï	(Algeria)	22	22	0	3	3	1	1	1	0	4	4	2	30	30	3
20	DF	Nacereddine Khoualed	(Algeria)	24	23	0	2	2	0	1	1	0	5	5	0	32	31	0
25	DF	Mokhtar Benmoussa	(Algeria)	23	20	2	3	2	0	1	0	0	6	5	1	33	27	3
26	DF	Brahim Boudebouda	(Algeria)	21	19	5	3	3	1	1	1	0	2	2	0	27	25	5
~~29~~	DF	Salim Laassami (Note: Player transferred out during the season)	(Algeria)	0	0	0	0	0	0	0	0	0	0	0	0	0	0	0
30	DF	Mohamed Rabie Meftah	(Algeria)	27	27	5	3	3	0	1	1	0	4	4	2	35	35	7
Midfielders
5	MF	Abderrahmane Bourdim	(Algeria)	2	0	0	1	0	0	0	0	0	0	0	0	3	0	0
7	MF	Zinedine Ferhat	(Algeria)	19	16	1	2	2	0	1	1	0	2	2	0	24	21	1
~~8~~	MF	Akim Orinel	(Algeria)	2	2	0	0	0	0	1	0	0	0	0	0	3	2	0
8	MF	Kaddour Beldjilali	(Algeria)	7	4	1	1	0	0	0	0	0	2	1	1	10	5	2
10	MF	Youcef Belaïli	(Algeria)	25	20	6	2	1	0	0	0	0	5	4	2	32	25	8
11	MF	Hocine El Orfi	(Algeria)	14	9	0	0	0	0	0	0	0	4	4	0	18	13	0
13	MF	Nassim Bouchema	(Algeria)	23	21	1	3	3	0	1	1	0	5	5	1	32	30	2
15	MF	Bouazza Feham	(Algeria)	16	8	1	1	1	0	1	1	0	4	3	0	22	13	1
~~21~~	MF	Noui Laïfa	(Algeria)	1	1	0	0	0	0	0	0	0	0	0	0	1	1	0
23	MF	Hamza Koudri	(Algeria)	25	25	2	3	3	0	1	1	0	4	3	1	33	32	3
24	MF	Mohammed Benkhemassa	(Algeria)	12	9	1	2	1	0	0	0	0	3	0	0	17	10	1
28	MF	Karim Baïteche	(Algeria)	18	11	2	0	0	0	0	0	0	5	5	0	23	16	2
Forwards
9	FW	Carolus Andriamatsinoro	(Madagascar)	28	20	1	3	3	2	1	1	0	6	2	2	38	26	5
12	FW	Manucho	(Ivory Coast)	9	5	2	0	0	0	0	0	0	3	2	0	12	7	2
14	FW	Rachid Nadji	(Algeria)	20	11	3	3	2	2	1	1	0	2	2	0	26	16	5
18	FW	Mohamed Seguer	(Algeria)	14	6	1	1	0	0	0	0	0	1	0	0	16	6	1
~~19~~	FW	Ernest Nsombo	(Cameroon)	4	1	0	0	0	0	1	0	0	0	0	0	5	1	0
20	FW	Mohamed Taib	(Algeria)	1	0	0	0	0	0	0	0	0	0	0	0	1	0	0
21	FW	Rostand Kako	(Cameroon)	2	2	0	0	0	0	0	0	0	0	0	0	2	2	0
33	FW	Abderrahmane Meziane	(Algeria)	5	0	1	2	0	0	0	0	0	1	0	0	8	0	1
Total				30		35	3		7	1		0	6		13	40		55

Last updated: 17 June 2022
Source: soccerway.com

=== Disciplinary record ===
No.	Pos.	Player	Ligue 1			Algerian Cup			Super Cup			Champions League			Total		
No.	Pos.	Player	Yellow card	(yellow card) (yellow-red card)	Red card	Yellow card	(yellow card) (yellow-red card)	Red card	Yellow card	(yellow card) (yellow-red card)	Red card	Yellow card	(yellow card) (yellow-red card)	Red card	Yellow card	(yellow card) (yellow-red card)	Red card
1	GK	(Algeria) Lamine Zemmamouche	0	0	0	0	0	0	0	0	0	2	0	0	2	0	0
27	GK	(Algeria) Mourad Berrefane	1	0	0	0	0	0	0	0	0	0	0	0	1	0	0
3	DF	(Algeria) Ayoub Abdellaoui	2	0	0	0	0	0	0	0	0	1	0	0	3	0	0
4	DF	(Algeria) Abdelkader Laïfaoui	4	0	0	0	0	0	0	0	0	0	0	0	4	0	0
6	DF	(Algeria) Farouk Chafaï	6	0	0	0	0	0	0	0	0	1	0	0	7	0	0
20	DF	(Algeria) Nacereddine Khoualed	5	0	2	2	0	0	0	0	0	0	0	0	7	0	2
25	DF	(Algeria) Mokhtar Benmoussa	2	1	0	0	0	0	0	0	0	0	0	0	2	1	0
26	DF	(Algeria) Brahim Boudebouda	3	0	0	0	0	0	0	0	0	0	0	0	3	0	0
30	DF	(Algeria) Mohamed Rabie Meftah	9	0	0	0	0	0	0	0	0	2	0	0	11	0	0
7	MF	(Algeria) Zinedine Ferhat	1	0	1	0	0	0	0	0	0	1	0	0	2	0	1
10	MF	(Algeria) Youcef Belaïli	7	0	1	0	0	0	0	0	0	1	0	0	8	0	1
11	MF	(Algeria) Hocine El Orfi	3	0	0	0	0	0	0	0	0	0	0	0	3	0	0
13	MF	(Algeria) Nassim Bouchema	9	0	0	2	0	0	0	0	0	2	0	0	13	0	0
15	MF	(Algeria) Bouazza Feham	1	0	0	0	0	0	0	0	0	1	0	0	2	0	0
23	MF	(Algeria) Hamza Koudri	6	0	0	2	0	0	1	0	0	0	0	1	9	0	1
24	MF	(Algeria) Mohammed Benkhemassa	5	0	0	0	0	0	0	0	0	0	0	0	5	0	0
28	MF	(Algeria) Karim Baïteche	1	0	0	0	0	0	0	0	0	0	0	0	1	0	0
9	FW	(Madagascar) Carolus Andriamatsinoro	1	0	0	0	0	0	0	0	0	1	0	0	2	0	0
12	FW	(Ivory Coast) Manucho	0	0	0	0	0	0	0	0	0	1	0	0	1	0	0
14	FW	(Algeria) Rachid Nadji	2	0	0	0	0	0	0	0	0	0	0	1	2	0	1
18	FW	(Algeria) Mohamed Seguer	2	0	0	1	0	0	0	0	0	0	0	0	3	0	0
Total			70	1	4	7	0	0	1	0	0	13	0	2	91	1	6

=== Goalscorers ===
Includes all competitive matches. The list is sorted alphabetically by surname when total goals are equal.

No.	Nat.	Player	Pos.	L 1	SC	AC	CL 1	TOTAL
10	(Algeria)	Youcef Belaïli	MF	6	0	0	2	8
30	(Algeria)	Mohamed Rabie Meftah	DF	5	0	0	2	7
26	(Algeria)	Brahim Boudebouda	DF	4	0	2	0	6
14	(Algeria)	Rachid Nadji	FW	3	0	2	0	5
9	(Madagascar)	Carolus Andriamatsinoro	FW	1	0	2	2	5
6	(Algeria)	Farouk Chafaï	DF	0	0	1	2	3
25	(Algeria)	Mokhtar Benmoussa	DF	2	0	0	1	3
23	(Algeria)	Hamza Koudri	MF	2	0	0	1	3
12	(Ivory Coast)	Manucho	FW	2	0	0	0	2
28	(Algeria)	Karim Baïteche	MF	2	0	0	0	2
13	(Algeria)	Nassim Bouchema	MF	1	0	0	1	2
8	(Algeria)	Kaddour Beldjilali	MF	1	0	0	1	2
15	(Algeria)	Bouazza Feham	MF	1	0	0	0	1
18	(Algeria)	Mohamed Seguer	FW	1	0	0	0	1
33	(Algeria)	Abderrahmane Meziane	FW	1	0	0	0	1
25	(Algeria)	Mohammed Benkhemassa	MF	1	0	0	0	1
7	(Algeria)	Zinedine Ferhat	MF	1	0	0	0	1
4	(Algeria)	Abdelkader Laïfaoui	DF	0	0	0	1	1
Own Goals				1	0	0	0	1
Totals				35	0	7	13	55

=== Suspensions ===
Date Incurred	Nation	Name	Games Missed	Reason
23 August 2014	(Algeria)	Mokhtar Benmoussa	2	(red card) (vs. JS Kabylie)
27 September 2014	(Algeria)	Youcef Belaïli	2	(red card) (vs. USM El Harrach)
24 October 2014	(Algeria)	Nassim Bouchema	1	Yellow card
1 November 2014	(Algeria)	Nacereddine Khoualed	1	Yellow card
29 November 2014	(Algeria)	Hamza Koudri	1	Yellow card
30 December 2014	(Algeria)	Farouk Chafaï	1	Yellow card
6 February 2015	(Algeria)	Nassim Bouchema	1	Yellow card
1 March 2015	(Algeria)	Hamza Koudri	1	(red card) (vs. Foullah Edifice FC)
15 March 2015	(Algeria)	Rachid Nadji	2	(red card) (vs. AS Pikine)
3 April 2015	(Algeria)	Nassim Bouchema	1	Yellow card
11 April 2015	(Algeria)	Nacereddine Khoualed	2	(red card) (vs. MC El Eulma)
19 April 2015	(Algeria)	Mohamed Meftah	1	Yellow card
25 April 2015	(Algeria)	Youcef Belaïli	1	Yellow card
3 May 2015	(Algeria)	Mohamed Lamine Zemmamouche	1	Yellow card
9 May 2015	(Algeria)	Nacereddine Khoualed	1	(red card) (vs. JS Saoura)
23 May 2015	(Algeria)	Zinedine Ferhat	2	(red card) (vs. ASM Oran)

=== Penalties ===
Date	Nation	Name	Opposition	Scored?
16 August 2014	(Algeria)	Mohamed Meftah	ES Sétif	✓
13 September 2014	(Algeria)	Mohamed Meftah	CR Belouizdad	✓
6 February 2015	(Algeria)	Mohamed Meftah	RC Arbaâ	✓
6 February 2015	(Algeria)	Zinedine Ferhat	RC Arbaâ	✓
15 February 2015	(Algeria)	Youcef Belaïli	Foullah Edifice FC	✓
15 March 2015	(Algeria)	Mohamed Meftah	AS Pikine	✓
29 May 2015	(Algeria)	Bouazza Feham	ASO Chlef	✓

=== Clean sheets ===
Includes all competitive matches.

No.	Nat	Name	L 1	AC	SC	CL 1	Total
1	(Algeria)	Lamine Zemmamouche	8	1	–	1	10
27	(Algeria)	Mourad Berrefane	2	–	–	–	2
		TOTALS	10	1	–	1	12

=== Overall seasonal record ===
Note: Games which are level after extra-time and are decided by a penalty shoot-out are listed as draws.

Games played	40 (30 Ligue 1, 1 Super Cup, 3 Algerian Cup, 6 Champions League)
Games won	15 (10 Ligue 1, 0 Super Cup, 2 Algerian Cup, 3 Champions League)
Games drawn	14 (11 Ligue 1, 0 Super Cup, 1 Algerian Cup, 2 Champions League)
Games lost	11 (9 Ligue 1, 1 Super Cup, 0 Algerian Cup, 1 Champions League)
Win %	37.50%
Goals scored	55 (35 Ligue 1, 0 Super Cup, 7 Algerian Cup, 13 Champions League)
Goals conceded	37 (27 Ligue 1, 1 Super Cup, 2 Algerian Cup, 7 Champions League)
Goal difference	+18 (+8 Ligue 1, -1 Super Cup, +5 Algerian Cup, +6 Champions League)
Yellow cards	93 (72 Ligue 1, 1 Super Cup, 7 Algerian Cup, 13 Champions League)
Red cards	7 (5 Ligue 1, 0 Super Cup, 0 Algerian Cup, 2 Champions League)
Worst discipline	
Biggest win	5-1 (vs. RC Arbaâ, Algerian Ligue Professionnelle 1, 6.02.2015); 5-1 (vs. AS Pikine, 2015 CAF Champions League, 15.03.2015)
Heaviest defeat	1-3 (on 1 occasions) 0-2 (on 1 occasions)
Highest scoring match	5-1 (vs. RC Arbaâ, Algerian Ligue Professionnelle 1, 6.02.2015); 5-1 (vs. AS Pikine, 2015 CAF Champions League, 15.03.2015)
Most appearances	38 (Carolus Andriamatsinoro)
Top scorer	8 (Youcef Belaïli)
Most assists	8 (Mokhtar Benmoussa)
