= 2013–14 USM Alger season =

USM Alger
2013–14 season
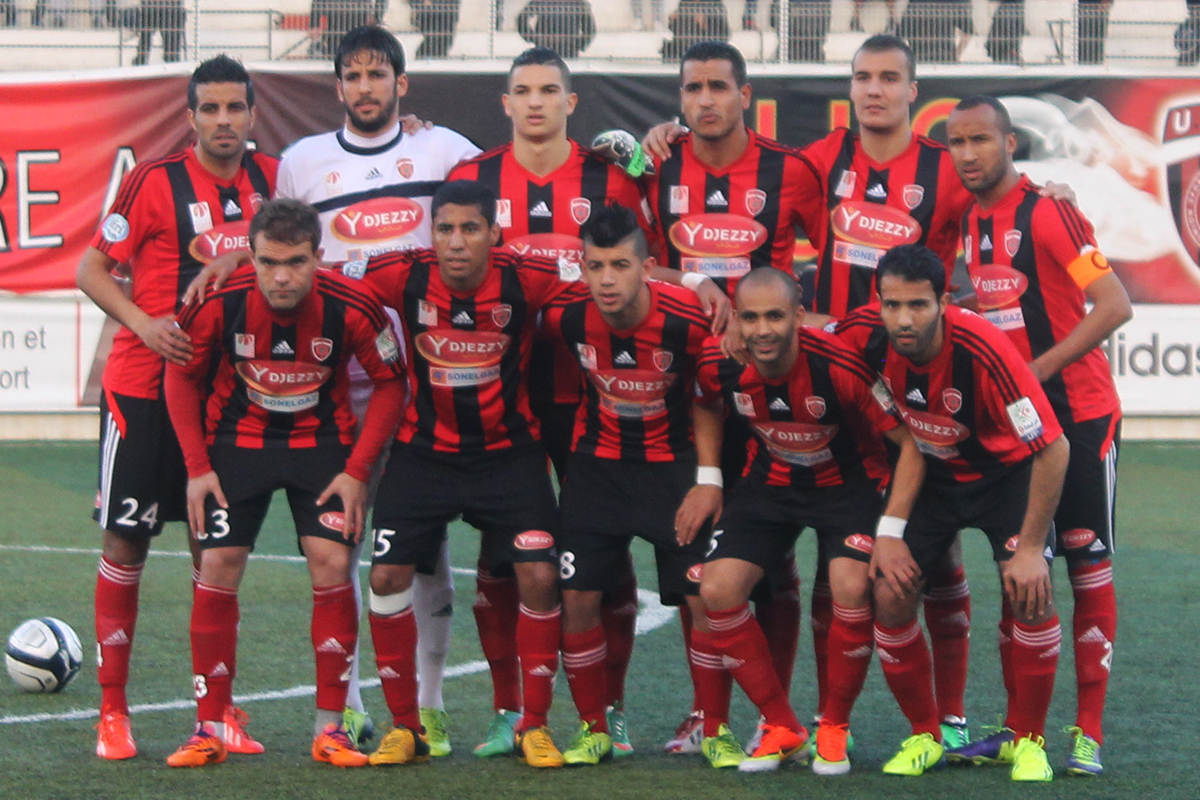
- USM Alger 2013–14 with From Left to Right: Stand Up : Benamara - Zemmamouche - Ferhat - Ziaya - Bouchema - Khoualed (C). Sitting Koudri - Feham - Baïteche - Benmoussa - Laïfaoui.
- Chairman: Ali Haddad
- Head coach: Rolland Courbis (until 25 October 2013); Hubert Velud (from 2 November 2013)
- Stadium: Stade Omar Hammadi
- Ligue 1: 1st
- Algerian Cup: Round of 32
- Algerian Super Cup: winners
- Top goalscorer: League: Ahmed Gasmi (6 goals); All: Carolus Andriamatsinoro; Abdelmalek Ziaya; Ahmed Gasmi (6 goals)
Home colours	Away colours	Third colours

In the 2013–14 season, USM Alger competed in the Ligue 1 for the 36th time, as well as the Algerian Cup. It was their 19th consecutive season in the top flight of Algerian football.

== Squad list ==
Players and squad numbers last updated on 22 May 2014.
Note: Flags indicate national team as has been defined under FIFA eligibility rules. Players may hold more than one non-FIFA nationality.

No.	Nat.	Position	Name	Date of birth (age)	Signed from	Apps	Goals
Goalkeepers
1	(Algeria)	GK	Mohamed Lamine Zemmamouche	19 March 1985 (aged 28)	(Algeria) MC Alger	213	0
16	(Algeria)	GK	Ismaïl Mansouri	7 January 1988 (aged 25)	(Algeria) Reserve team	28	0
29	(Algeria)	GK	Sid Ahmed Rafik Mazouzi	1 February 1989 (aged 24)	(Algeria) WA Tlemcen	2	0
Defenders
4	(Algeria)	CB / RB	Abdelkader Laïfaoui	9 July 1981 (aged 32)	(Algeria) ES Sétif	58	4
6	(Algeria)	CB	Farouk Chafaï	23 June 1990 (aged 23)	(Algeria) MC Alger	94	5
20	(Algeria)	CB	Nacereddine Khoualed	16 April 1986 (aged 27)	(Algeria) US Biskra	211	7
24	(Algeria)	RB	Youcef Benamara	24 April 1984 (aged 29)	(Algeria) CA Batna	30	0
26	(Algeria)	LB	Brahim Boudebouda	28 August 1990 (aged 23)	(France) Le Mans FC	53	2
19	(Algeria)	CB	Ibrahim Bekakchi	10 January 1992 (aged 21)	(Algeria) Reserve team	6	0
30	(Algeria)	RB	Mohamed Rabie Meftah	5 May 1985 (aged 28)	(Algeria) JSM Béjaïa	77	9
	(Algeria)	CB	Ayoub Abdellaoui	16 February 1993 (aged 20)	(Algeria) Reserve team	1	0
25	(Algeria)	LB / LW	Mokhtar Benmoussa	1 August 1986 (aged 27)	(Algeria) ES Sétif	67	4
Midfielders
21	(Algeria)	RW	Djamel Rabti	16 February 1992 (aged 21)	(Algeria) Reserve team	3	0
28	(Algeria)	AM	Karim Baïteche	10 July 1991 (aged 22)	(Algeria) Reserve team	18	1
11	(Algeria)	AM	Hocine El Orfi	21 January 1987 (aged 26)	(Algeria) JS Kabylie	45	0
13	(Algeria)	CM	Nassim Bouchema	5 May 1988 (aged 25)	(Algeria) MC Alger	92	4
14	(Algeria)	AM	Lamouri Djediat	20 January 1981 (aged 32)	(Algeria) ASO Chlef	84	9
15	(Algeria)	AM	Bouazza Feham	11 April 1986 (aged 27)	(Algeria) ES Sétif	92	9
23	(Algeria)	DM	Hamza Koudri	15 December 1987 (aged 26)	(Algeria) MC Alger	58	0
47	(Algeria)	RW	Zinedine Ferhat	1 March 1993 (aged 20)	(Algeria) FAF Academy	85	7
Forwards
7	(Cameroon)		Ernest Nsombo	6 March 1991 (aged 22)	(Cameroon) Astres FC	6	2
17	(Algeria)		Djamel Eddine Chatal	23 May 1992 (aged 21)	(Algeria) Reserve team	12	1
31	(Algeria)		Samy Frioui	7 September 1991 (aged 22)	(Algeria) Reserve team	11	1
8	(Algeria)		Ahmed Gasmi	22 November 1984 (aged 29)	(Algeria) JSM Béjaïa	53	15
2	(Madagascar)		Carolus Andriamatsinoro	6 September 1989 (aged 24)	(Algeria) WA Tlemcen	30	6
18	(Algeria)		Mohamed Seguer	19 January 1985 (aged 28)	(Algeria) ASO Chlef	45	7
9	(Algeria)		Abdelmalek Ziaya	23 January 1984 (aged 29)	(Tunisia) CA Bizerte	31	8
	(Algeria)	LW	Abderrahmane Meziane	7 March 1994 (aged 19)	(Algeria) Reserve team	1	0

== Transfers ==
=== In ===
Date	Pos	Player	From club	Transfer fee	Source
9 June 2013	MF	(Algeria) Karim Baïteche	Reserve team	First Professional Contract	
9 June 2013	DF	(Algeria) Ibrahim Bekakchi	Reserve team	First Professional Contract	
9 June 2013	FW	(Algeria) Djamel Eddine Chatal	Reserve team	First Professional Contract	
9 June 2013	FW	(Algeria) Samy Frioui	Reserve team	First Professional Contract	
9 June 2013	MF	(Algeria) Djamel Rabti	Reserve team	First Professional Contract	
30 June 2013	GK	(Algeria) Sid Ahmed Rafik Mazouzi	WA Tlemcen	Return from loan	
30 June 2013	MF	(Algeria) Mehdi Benaldjia	CR Belouizdad	Return from loan	
15 January 2014	FW	(Cameroon) Ernest Nsombo	(Cameroon) Astres FC	Undisclosed	

=== Out ===
Date	Pos	Player	To club	Transfer fee	Source
17 June 2013	FW	(Algeria) Hichem Mokhtari	MC Oran	Free transfer	
28 June 2013	MF	(Algeria) Reda Betrouni	MO Béjaïa	Loan one year	
28 June 2013	MF	(Algeria) Nassim Yattou	MO Béjaïa	Loan one year	
28 June 2013	FW	(Algeria) Saïd Sayah	CRB Aïn Fakroun	Loan one year	
30 June 2013	GK	(Algeria) Amara Daïf	ASO Chlef	Free transfer	
30 June 2013	FW	(Algeria) Mouaouia Meklouche	RC Arbaa	Free transfer	
30 June 2013	MF	(Niger) Yacouba Ali	(Niger) AS Police	Free transfer (Released)	
30 June 2013	DF	(Algeria) Mohamed Yekhlef	Unattached	Free transfer (Released)	
4 July 2013	MF	(Algeria) Saad Tedjar	ASO Chlef	Free transfer	
15 July 2013	FW	(Algeria) Salim Hanifi	CR Belouizdad	Free transfer (Released)	
18 July 2013	FW	(Algeria) Noureddine Daham	ASO Chlef	Free transfer (Released)	
20 septembre 2013	DF	(Algeria) Ismaël Bouzid	(Scotland) Kilmarnock	Free transfer (Released)	
25 December 2013	MF	(Algeria) Mehdi Benaldjia	CR Belouizdad	Loan one year and a half	

== Competitions ==
=== Overview ===
Competition	Record								Started round	Final position / round	First match	Last match
Competition	G	W	D	L	GF	GA	GD	Win %	Started round	Final position / round	First match	Last match
Ligue 1	30	20	8	2	49	21	+28	66.67	—N/a	Winners	24 August 2013	22 May 2014
Algerian Cup	2	0	2	0	0	0	+0	0.00	Round of 64	Round of 32	7 December 2013	21 December 2013
Super Cup	1	1	0	0	2	0	+2	100.00	Final	Winners	11 January 2014	
Total	33	21	10	2	51	21	+30	63.64				

Updated to match played 22 May 2014
Source: Competitions

=== Ligue 1 ===
==== League table ====
Pos	Team	Pld	W	D	L	GF	GA	GD	Pts	Qualification or relegation
1	USM Alger (C)	30	20	8	2	49	21	+28	68	Qualification for the Champions League preliminary round
2	JS Kabylie (Note: JS Kabylie, the 2013–14 Algerian Ligue Professionnelle 1 runner-up, was suspended by the CAF for two years due to the death of Albert Ebossé during their league home match against USM Alger. On 11 February 2015, the CAS overturned the suspension. However, their replacement MC El Eulma continued to represent Algeria in the 2015 CAF Champions League.)	30	15	9	6	39	21	+18	54	
3	ES Sétif	30	15	8	7	40	27	+13	53	Qualification for the Champions League first round
4	MC El Eulma	30	13	9	8	38	28	+10	48	Qualification for the Champions League preliminary round
5	USM El Harrach (Note: USM El Harrach would have qualified for the CAF Confederation Cup preliminary round by finishing fourth in the 2013–14 Algerian Ligue Professionnelle 1, but due to the penalty imposed on them by CAF after their withdrawal from the 2014 CAF Champions League, they could not participate.)	30	13	8	9	34	27	+7	47	

Updated to match(es) played on 22 May 2014. Source: DZFoot
Rules for classification: 1) points; 2) head-to-head points; 3) head-to-head goal difference; 4) goal difference; 5) total goals; 6) fairplay ranking; 7) playoff.
(C) Champions

==== Results summary ====
Overall								Home						Away					
Pld	W	D	L	GF	GA	GD	Pts	W	D	L	GF	GA	GD	W	D	L	GF	GA	GD
0	0	0	0	0	0	0	0	0	0	0	0	0	0	0	0	0	0	0	0

Last updated: 22 May 2014.
Source: Competitive matches

==== Results by round ====
Round	1	2	3	4	5	6	7	8	9	10	11	12	13	14	15	16	17	18	19	20	21	22	23	24	25	26	27	28	29	30
Ground	H	A	H	A	H	A	H	A	A	H	A	H	A	H	A	A	H	A	H	A	H	A	H	H	A	H	A	H	A	H
Result	W	D	L	W	W	L	D	L	D	W	W	W	W	W	D	W	W	D	W	W	W	W	W	W	W	W	D	W	W	D
Position	1	2	8	5	3	4	5	7	7	5	4	3	1	1	1	1	1	2	2	2	1	1	1	1	1	1	1	1	1	1

Updated to match(es) played on 22 May 2014. Source: Competitive matches
A = Away; H = Home; W = Win; D = Draw; L = Loss

=== Matches ===
24 August 2013 Round 1	USM Alger	4–1	MO Béjaïa	Bologhine
18:00	Djediat 10'; Andria 68', 72'; Ziaya 88' (pen.)	Soccerway report	85' D. Akrour	Stadium: Stade Omar Hamadi; Referee: Mohamed Benouza

31 August 2013 Round 2	JS Kabylie	0–0	USM Alger	Tizi Ouzou
17:45		Soccerway report	(yellow card) 81' Zemmamouche; (yellow card) 73' Boudebouda; (red card) 40' Meftah; (yellow card) 35' (yellow-red card) 55' El Orfi	Stadium: Stade 1er Novembre 1954; Referee: Mehdi Abid Charef

3 September 2013 Round 3	USM Alger	1–3	CA Bordj Bou Arreridj	Bologhine
18:00	Khoualed 68'; Ziaya (yellow card) 53'; Boudebouda (yellow card) 9' (yellow-red card) 47'	Soccerway report	9' (pen.), 76' M. Tiaïba; 90+2' O. Mesfar	Stadium: Omar Hamadi Stadium; Referee: Mohamed Bachir

13 September 2013 Round 4	USM El Harrach	1–2	USM Alger	Algiers
17:00	S. Hanitser 12'	Soccerway report	51' Frioui; 53' (yellow card) 53' (yellow-red card) 77' Andria; (yellow card) 40' Laïfaoui; (yellow card) 83' Ferhat	Stadium: Stade 1er Novembre 1954; Referee: Boubekeur Zouaoui

21 September 2013 Round 5	USM Alger	1–0	MC Alger	Algiers
17:45	Gasmi 12' (pen.); Feham (yellow card) 7'; Chafaï (yellow card) 34'; Bouchema (yellow card) 70'	Soccerway report		Stadium: Stade 5 Juillet 1962; Referee: Redouane Necib

28 September 2013 Round 6	JS Saoura	0–0	USM Alger	Béchar
16:00		Soccerway report	(yellow card) 38' Ferhat; (yellow card) 78' Carolus; (yellow card) 90' Khoualed	Stadium: Stade 20 Août 1955; Referee: Rafik Achouri

4 October 2013 Round 7	USM Alger	1–1	CS Constantine	Bologhine
17:45	Chatal 1' (yellow card) 42'; Bouchema (yellow card) 89'	Soccerway report	45' H. Boulemdaïs	Stadium: Omar Hamadi Stadium; Referee: Djamel Haimoudi

19 October 2013 Round 8	MC El Eulma	1–0	USM Alger	El Eulma
18:00	T. Zeghidi 55'	Soccerway report	(yellow card) 18' Khoualed; (yellow card) 45+2' Koudri	Stadium: Stade Messaoud Zougar; Referee: Mohamed Ghorbal

26 October 2013 Round 9	ASO Chlef	0–0	USM Alger	Chlef
18:00		Soccerway report	(yellow card) 39' Bouchema; (yellow card) 90+2' Frioui	Stadium: Stade Mohamed Boumezrag; Referee: Mohamed Saïdi

2 November 2013 Round 10	USM Alger	1–0	CRB Aïn Fakroun	Bologhine
18:00	Andria 26'	Soccerway report		Stadium: Omar Hamadi Stadium; Referee: Youssef Zerrouki

9 November 2013 Round 11	MC Oran	0–1	USM Alger	Oran
17:45		Soccerway report	46' Ferhat; (yellow card) 22' Koudri; (yellow card) 68' Baïteche	Stadium: Stade Ahmed Zabana; Referee: Redouane Necib

22 November 2013 Round 12	USM Alger	2–0	CR Belouizdad	Bologhine
17:45	Djediat 6'; Gasmi 22'; Bouchema (yellow card) 10'; Chafaï (yellow card) 35'	Soccerway report		Stadium: Omar Hamadi Stadium; Referee: Mokhtar Amalou

30 November 2013 Round 13	RC Arbaa	0–1	USM Alger	Blida
15:00		Soccerway report	47' (pen.) Gasmi; (yellow card) 90+4' Zemmamouche	Stadium: Stade Frères Brakni; Referee: Mehdi Abid Charef

14 December 2013 Round 14	USM Alger	1–0	JSM Béjaïa	Bologhine
18:00	Ziaya 71' (yellow card) 80'; Frioui (yellow card) 11'; Ferhat (red card) 45+3'	Soccerway report		Stadium: Omar Hamadi Stadium; Referee: Youssef Zerrouki

28 December 2013 Round 15	ES Sétif	1–1	USM Alger	Sétif
17:45	E. Madouni 90+4'	Soccerway report	63' Feham; (yellow card) 34' Boudebouda; (yellow card) 53' Bouchema; (yellow card) 74' Ziaya; (yellow card) 86' Zemmamouche	Stadium: Stade 8 Mai 1945; Referee: Mohamed Saïdi

18 January 2014 Round 16	MO Béjaïa	0–3	USM Alger	Béjaïa
17:45		Soccerway report	7' Chafaï	Stadium: Stade de l'Unité Maghrébine; Referee: Redouane Necib

1 February 2014 Round 17	USM Alger	3–2	JS Kabylie	Bologhine
17:45	Meftah 30' (pen.); Ziaya 59', 73'; Carolus (yellow card) 61'; El Orfi (yellow card) 43' (yellow-red card) 90'	Soccerway report	5', 90' (pen.) Rial	Stadium: Omar Hamadi Stadium; Referee: Mokhtar Amalou

8 February 2014 Round 18	CA Bordj Bou Arreridj	0–0	USM Alger	Bordj Bou Arreridj
15:00		Soccerway report	(yellow card) 24' Baïteche; (yellow card) 45+1' Ziaya; (yellow card) 86' Meftah	Stadium: Stade 20 Août 1955; Referee: Mohamed Saïdi

15 February 2014 Round 19	USM Alger	2–1	USM El Harrach	Bologhine
17:45	Chatal 5'; Feham 56' (pen.); Benamara (yellow card) 69'	Soccerway report	(yellow card) 35' Boulakhoua; (yellow card) 39' Younès; 45' I. Sylla; (yellow card) 51' Hendou; (yellow card) 55' Doukha; (yellow card) 81' Amada; (yellow card) 90+3' Ziane Cherif	Stadium: Omar Hamadi Stadium; Referee: Redouane Necib

22 February 2014 Round 20	MC Alger	0–3	USM Alger	Blida
16:00		Soccerway report	38' (yellow card) 78' Ziaya; 47' Chafaï; 81' (yellow card) 82' Gasmi; (yellow card) 17' Koudri	Stadium: Stade Mustapha Tchaker; Referee: Mohamed Bichari

1 March 2014 Round 21	USM Alger	1–0	JS Saoura	Bologhine
18:00	Meftah (yellow card) 29' (goal) 89' (pen.); Feham (yellow card) 50'	Soccerway report		Stadium: Omar Hamadi Stadium; Referee: Mohamed Sahraoui

7 March 2014 Round 22	CS Constantine	1–2	USM Alger	Constantine
16:00	H. Boulemdaïs 38'	Soccerway report	84' Chafaï; 90+3' Andria; (yellow card) 45+1' Feham; (yellow card) 47' Boudebouda	Stadium: Stade Mohamed Hamlaoui; Referee: Mohamed Benouza

15 March 2014 Round 23	USM Alger	2–1	MC El Eulma	Bologhine
18:00	Meftah 81'; Seguer 84'; Feham (yellow card) 61'	Soccerway report	76' I. Benettayeb	Stadium: Omar Hamadi Stadium; Referee: Mohamed Bachir

22 March 2014 Round 24	USM Alger	2–0	ASO Chlef	Bologhine
18:00	Feham 56'; Ferhat 75'; Chafaï (yellow card) 28'; Seguer (yellow card) 60'	Soccerway report		Stadium: Omar Hamadi Stadium; Referee: Abdelkrim Bouchama

26 April 2014 Round 25	CRB Aïn Fakroun	0–2	USM Alger	Aïn M'lila
15:00		Soccerway report	58' Boudebouda; 90' Gasmi	Stadium: Stade des Frères Demane Debbih; Attendance: 0 (close doors); Referee: Mohamed Boukhalfa

3 May 2014 Round 26	USM Alger	5–2	MC Oran	Bologhine
18:00	Nsombo 7'; Meftah 31' (pen.); Ferhat (yellow card) 40' (goal) 40', 63'; Seguer 44'	Soccerway report	19', 90+1' Berradja	Stadium: Omar Hamadi Stadium; Referee: Farouk Mial

10 May 2014 Round 27	CR Belouizdad	2–2	USM Alger	Algiers
17:00	Bencherifa 42'; Benaldjia 90+1' (pen.)	Soccerway report	52', 65' Chafaï; (yellow card) 23' Meftah; (yellow card) 85' Khoualed	Stadium: Stade 20 Août 1955; Referee: Lahlou Benbraham

13 May 2014 Round 28	USM Alger	2–1	RC Arbaa	Bologhine
17:00	Khoualed 16' (yellow card) 40'; Feham 50'; Meftah (yellow card) 70'	Soccerway report	70' Bougueroua	Stadium: Omar Hamadi Stadium; Referee: Ahmed Bouzrar

17 May 2014 Round 29	JSM Béjaïa	1–2	USM Alger	Béjaïa
17:00	B. Mellel 90+1'	Soccerway report	5' Gasmi; 73' Nsombo	Stadium: Stade de l'Unité Maghrébine; Attendance: 0 (close doors); Referee: Abderrezzak Arab

22 May 2014 Round 30	USM Alger	2–2	ES Sétif	Bologhine
19:15	Seguer 8'; Ferhat 76'; Laïfaoui (yellow card) 71'; El Orfi (yellow card) 58'; Gasmi (yellow card) 82' (yellow-red card) 90+4'	Soccerway report	20' Djahnit; 88' Nadji	Stadium: Omar Hamadi Stadium; Referee: Redouane Necib

=== Algerian Cup ===
7 December 2013 Round of 64	NA Hussein Dey	0–0 (a.e.t.) (4–5 p)	USM Alger	Algiers
16:00				Stadium: Stade 20 Août 1955
	Penalties
	Guebli (penalty scored); Boussaid (penalty missed); Benyahia (penalty scored); Bendebka (penalty scored); Bouharbit (penalty missed); Zerguine (penalty scored); Khellaf (penalty missed)		(penalty missed) Meftah; (penalty scored) Bouchema; (penalty scored) Ferhat; (penalty missed) Boudebouda; (penalty scored) Khoualed; (penalty scored) El Orfi; (penalty scored) Djediat

21 December 2013 Round of 32	USM Alger	0–0 (a.e.t.) (2–3 p)	JS Kabylie	Algiers
17:00	El Orfi (yellow card) 70'; Ziaya (yellow card) 76'; Djediat (yellow card) 84'; Meftah (yellow card) 116'		Madi (yellow card) 4'; Chibane (yellow card) 52'; Rial (yellow card) 62'; Aouedj (yellow card) 88'	Stadium: Stade Omar Hamadi; Referee: Djamel Haimoudi

=== Super Cup ===
11 January 2014	USM Alger	2–0	ES Sétif	Blida
16:00	Ziaya 8'; Andria 40'	Report	(yellow card) 45'Karaoui; (yellow card) 76' Ferrahi	Stadium: Stade Mustapha Tchaker; Attendance: 14.312; Referee: Mohamed Bichari

== Squad information ==
=== Appearances and goals ===
No.	Pos	Player	Nat	Ligue 1			Algerian Cup			Super Cup			Total		
No.	Pos	Player	Nat	App	St	G	App	St	G	App	St	G	App	St	G
Goalkeepers
1	GK	Lamine Zemmamouche	(Algeria)	24	24	0	2	2	0	1	1	0	27	27	0
16	GK	Ismaïl Mansouri	(Algeria)	5	5	0	0	0	0	0	0	0	5	5	0
29	GK	Sid Ahmed Rafik Mazouzi	(Algeria)	1	1	0	0	0	0	0	0	0	1	1	0
Defenders
4	DF	Abdelkader Laïfaoui	(Algeria)	11	8	0	0	0	0	0	0	0	11	8	0
6	DF	Farouk Chafaï	(Algeria)	25	25	5	2	2	0	1	1	0	28	28	5
20	DF	Nacereddine Khoualed	(Algeria)	26	26	2	2	2	0	1	1	0	29	29	2
24	DF	Youcef Benamara	(Algeria)	5	3	0	0	0	0	0	0	0	5	3	0
26	DF	Brahim Boudebouda	(Algeria)	18	11	1	2	2	0	0	0	0	20	13	1
19	DF	Ibrahim Bekakchi	(Algeria)	1	1	0	0	0	0	0	0	0	1	1	0
	DF	Ayoub Abdellaoui	(Algeria)	1	0	0	0	0	0	0	0	0	1	0	0
25	DF	Mokhtar Benmoussa	(Algeria)	24	21	0	2	2	0	1	1	0	27	24	0
30	DF	Mohamed Rabie Meftah	(Algeria)	25	23	4	2	2	0	1	1	0	28	26	4
Midfielders
21	MF	Djamel Rabti	(Algeria)	3	2	0	0	0	0	0	0	0	3	2	0
28	MF	Karim Baïteche	(Algeria)	15	8	1	1	1	0	1	0	0	17	9	1
11	MF	Hocine El Orfi	(Algeria)	19	15	0	2	1	0	1	1	0	22	17	0
13	MF	Nassim Bouchema	(Algeria)	21	21	0	2	2	0	1	1	0	24	24	0
14	MF	Lamouri Djediat	(Algeria)	18	12	2	2	2	0	0	0	0	20	14	2
15	MF	Bouazza Feham	(Algeria)	25	20	4	1	0	0	1	1	0	27	21	4
23	MF	Hamza Koudri	(Algeria)	23	21	0	1	1	0	0	0	0	24	22	0
47	MF	Zinedine Ferhat	(Algeria)	29	29	5	1	1	0	1	1	0	31	31	0
Forwards
7	FW	Ernest Nsombo	(Cameroon)	6	5	2	0	0	0	0	0	0	6	5	2
17	FW	Djamel Eddine Chatal	(Algeria)	9	1	1	0	0	0	0	0	0	9	1	1
31	FW	Samy Frioui	(Algeria)	6	3	1	1	0	0	0	0	0	7	3	1
8	FW	Ahmed Gasmi	(Algeria)	16	8	6	1	1	0	1	0	0	18	9	6
2	FW	Carolus Andriamatsinoro	(Madagascar)	21	11	5	2	0	0	1	1	1	24	12	6
18	FW	Mohamed Seguer	(Algeria)	16	13	3	1	0	0	0	0	0	17	13	3
9	FW	Abdelmalek Ziaya	(Algeria)	16	13	5	1	1	0	1	1	1	18	15	6
	FW	Abderrahmane Meziane	(Algeria)	1	0	0	0	0	0	0	0	0	1	0	0
~~7~~	FW	Mehdi Benaldjia (Note: Player transferred out during the season)	(Algeria)	4	0	0	0	0	0	0	0	0	4	0	0
Total				30		49	2		0	1		2	33		51

Last updated: 17 June 2022
Source: soccerway.com

=== Disciplinary record ===
No.	Pos.	Player	Ligue 1			Algerian Cup			Super Cup			Total		
No.	Pos.	Player	Yellow card	(yellow card) (yellow-red card)	Red card	Yellow card	(yellow card) (yellow-red card)	Red card	Yellow card	(yellow card) (yellow-red card)	Red card	Yellow card	(yellow card) (yellow-red card)	Red card
1	GK	(Algeria) Lamine Zemmamouche	3	0	0	1	0	0	0	0	0	4	0	0
4	DF	(Algeria) Abdelkader Laïfaoui	2	0	0	0	0	0	0	0	0	2	0	0
6	DF	(Algeria) Farouk Chafaï	3	0	0	0	0	0	0	0	0	3	0	0
20	DF	(Algeria) Nacereddine Khoualed	4	0	0	0	0	0	0	0	0	4	0	0
24	DF	(Algeria) Youcef Benamara	1	0	0	0	0	0	0	0	0	1	0	0
26	DF	(Algeria) Brahim Boudebouda	5	1	0	0	0	0	0	0	0	5	1	0
25	DF	(Algeria) Mokhtar Benmoussa	0	0	0	1	0	0	0	0	0	1	0	0
30	DF	(Algeria) Mohamed Rabie Meftah	4	0	1	1	0	0	0	0	0	5	0	1
28	MF	(Algeria) Karim Baïteche	2	0	0	0	0	0	0	0	0	2	0	0
11	MF	(Algeria) Hocine El Orfi	3	2	0	1	0	0	0	0	0	4	2	0
13	MF	(Algeria) Nassim Bouchema	5	0	0	0	0	0	0	0	0	5	0	0
14	MF	(Algeria) Lamouri Djediat	0	0	0	1	0	0	0	0	0	1	0	0
15	MF	(Algeria) Bouazza Feham	4	0	0	0	0	0	0	0	0	4	0	0
23	MF	(Algeria) Hamza Koudri	3	0	0	0	0	0	0	0	0	3	0	0
47	MF	(Algeria) Zinedine Ferhat	3	0	1	0	0	0	0	0	0	3	0	1
17	FW	(Algeria) Djamel Eddine Chatal	1	0	0	0	0	0	0	0	0	1	0	0
31	FW	(Algeria) Samy Frioui	2	0	0	0	0	0	0	0	0	2	0	0
8	FW	(Algeria) Ahmed Gasmi	2	1	0	0	0	0	0	0	0	2	1	0
2	FW	(Algeria) Carolus Andriamatsinoro	3	1	0	0	0	0	0	0	0	3	1	0
18	FW	(Algeria) Mohamed Seguer	1	0	0	0	0	0	0	0	0	1	0	0
9	FW	(Algeria) Abdelmalek Ziaya	5	0	0	1	0	0	0	0	0	6	0	0
Total			56	5	2	6	0	0	0	0	0	62	5	2

=== Goalscorers ===
Includes all competitive matches. The list is sorted alphabetically by surname when total goals are equal.

No.	Nat.	Player	Pos.	L 1	AC	SC	TOTAL
8	(Algeria)	Ahmed Gasmi	FW	6	0	0	6
2	(Madagascar)	Carolus Andriamatsinoro	FW	5	0	1	6
9	(Algeria)	Abdelmalek Ziaya	FW	5	0	1	6
47	(Algeria)	Zinedine Ferhat	MF	5	0	0	5
30	(Algeria)	Mohamed Rabie Meftah	DF	4	0	0	4
15	(Algeria)	Bouazza Feham	MF	4	0	0	4
18	(Algeria)	Mohamed Seguer	FW	3	0	0	3
7	(Cameroon)	Ernest Nsombo	FW	2	0	0	2
20	(Algeria)	Nacereddine Khoualed	DF	2	0	0	2
14	(Algeria)	Lamouri Djediat	MF	2	0	0	2
26	(Algeria)	Brahim Boudebouda	DF	1	0	0	1
31	(Algeria)	Samy Frioui	FW	1	0	0	1
17	(Algeria)	Djamel Eddine Chatal	FW	1	0	0	1
28	(Algeria)	Karim Baïteche	MF	1	0	0	1
Own Goals				0	0	0	0
Totals				49	0	2	51

=== Clean sheets ===
Includes all competitive matches.

No.	Nat	Name	L 1	AC	SC	Total
1	(Algeria)	Lamine Zemmamouche	11	2	1	14
16	(Algeria)	Ismaïl Mansouri	2	0	0	2
29	(Algeria)	Sid Ahmed Rafik Mazouzi	1	0	0	1
		TOTALS	14	2	1	17
