= Hamza Koudri =

Algerian footballer (born 1987)

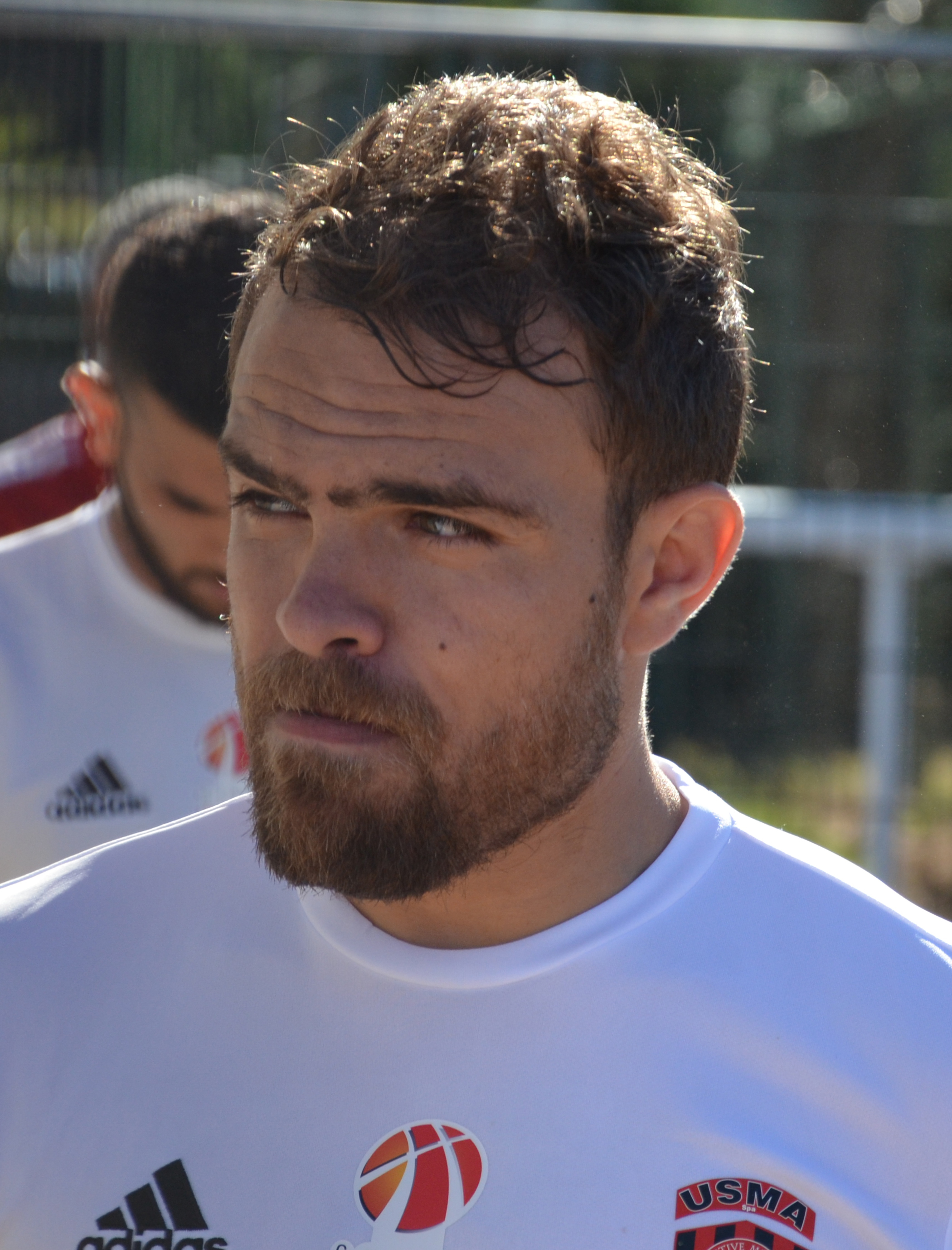
- Koudri with USM Alger in 2016

Personal information
- Full name: Hamza Koudri
- Date of birth: 15 December 1987 (age 38)
- Place of birth: Mila, Algeria
- Height: 1.77 m (5 ft 10 in)
- Position: Midfielder

Youth career
- Mila
- MC Alger

Senior career*
Years	Team	Apps	(Gls)
2006–2012	MC Alger	124	(5)
2012–2022	USM Alger	206	(14)

International career^{‡}
2008–	Algeria A'	5	(0)
2013	Algeria	2	(0)
- * Club domestic league appearances and goals as of 17 June 2022 ‡ National team caps and goals as of 25 May 2013

Hamza Koudri (Arabic: حمزة كودري; born December 15, 1987) is an Algerian footballer who plays as a midfielder for USM Alger in the Algerian Ligue Professionnelle 1.

== Club career ==
=== USM Alger ===
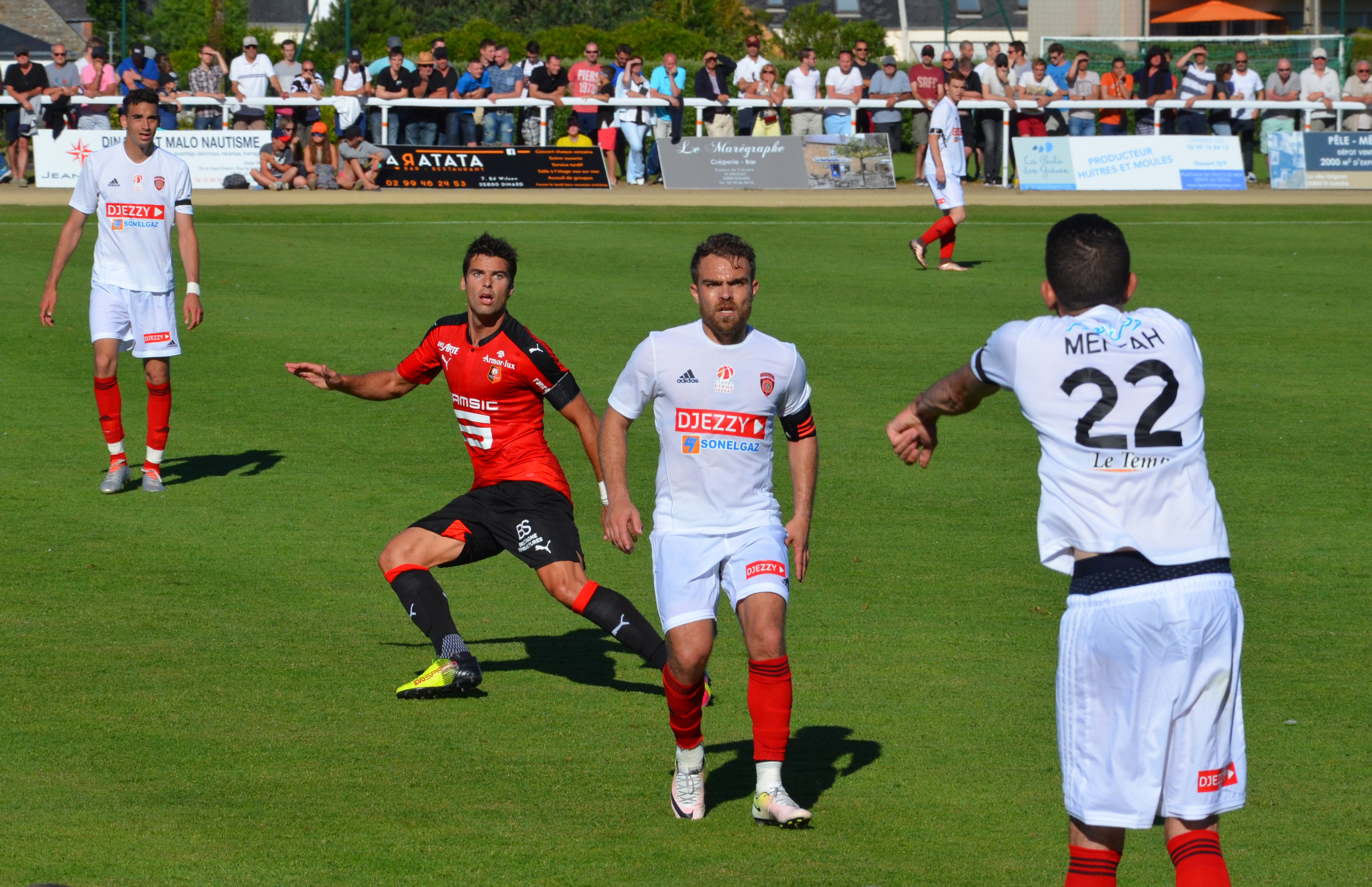
Hamza Koudri in 2016 against Stade Rennais.

On 26 May 2012 Hamza Koudri joined for two seasons coming from rivals MC Alger. and one of the reasons for his leaving is people in the club who spread rumors about him, He made his debut for the team in the Ligue 1 as a starter during a draw against CS Constantine 1–1, In his first season Koudri won two titles, the first the Algerian Cup against his former club MC Alger. and two weeks later, Koudri won the UAFA Club Cup against Al-Arabi SC, in the second leg in which was received sent off after a dangerous intervention. In the second season Koudri won again two titles, the first in the Super Cup against ES Sétif for the first time. and at the end of the season he won the first Ligue 1 title with USM Alger and the second in its history.

On 1 November 2014 Koudri scored his first goal with USM Alger since joining two years ago against MC El Eulma in a 2–1 win away from home. In the 2015 CAF Champions League, Koudri made the best continental achievement in his career when he reached the final and defeated his team against TP Mazembe. Koudri stated that lack of experience and poor choice of stadium were the reason behind the defeat and said it was his worst memory. in the same season Koudri won the league title for the second time. On 8 November 2016 Koudri renewed his contract for three years until 2020 after his previous contract had expired in June 2017, despite the problems that the player has suffered recently, in light of the brilliance of the young duo Raouf Benguit and Mohammed Benkhemassa.

USM Alger is my second family. I came as a young man and I am now 34 years old, it is a life i spent here and i only live in the house and Bologhine. Except for football i have known men here who have influenced me as a player or on my personal life, and when i grow up, i will teach my children to love USM Alger. For my best memory is the Algerian Cup against MC Alger, as for the worst was the Champions League Final.

— Hamza Koudri interview about his career with USM Alger.

In the 2018–19 season Koudri won his last title with USM Alger by winning the championship for the third time. In a season that was difficult due to the imprisonment of the club owner and the outbreak of protests in Algeria. On 24 August 2020 Hamza Koudri renewed for one season and is considered the best since joining the club, where he was the second best scorer with seven goals, including two doubles against NA Hussein Dey and RC Relizane. On 20 November 2022, in a match against US Biskra, Koudri sustained a serious injury which later became clear that he had cut the Cruciate ligament which would keep him away for the end of the season.

On 14 July 2022 Koudri officially left with tears after the administration refused to renew his contract, after ten years with the club during which he won seven titles. Reda Abdouche general director stated that it's will be an adventure to rely on a player who suffered from an injury in Cruciate ligament that kept him out of the field for a year and at his age especially since he's at the end of his contract, Abdouche said that they will not abandon him and if he decides to enter the field of training they will help him.

== International career ==
On 5 April 2008 he was called up by the Algeria A' National Team for a game against USM Blida on 11 April. He featured in both of Algeria's games against Morocco in the 2009 African Champions of Nations qualifiers.

== Career statistics ==
=== Club ===
As of 17 June 2022

Club	Season	League			Cup (Note: Includes the Algerian Cup)		Continental		Other		Total	
Club	Season	Division	Apps	Goals	Apps	Goals	Apps	Goals	Apps	Goals	Apps	Goals
MC Alger	2006–07	Ligue 1	2	0	—		—		—		2	0
MC Alger	2007–08	Ligue 1	23	3	1	0	2 (Note: All appearance(s) in CAF Confederation Cup)	0	1 (Note: All appearances in Algerian Super Cup)	0	27	3
MC Alger	2008–09	Ligue 1	24	0	0	0	—		—		24	0
MC Alger	2009–10	Ligue 1	27	1	3	2	—		—		30	3
MC Alger	2010–11	Ligue 1	26	0	2	0	6 (Note: All appearance(s) in Champions League)	0	4 (Note: All appearance(s) in North African Cup of Champions)	0	38	0
MC Alger	2011–12	Ligue 1	22	1	3	0	6	0	—		31	1
MC Alger	Total		124	5	9	2	14	0	5	0	152	7
USM Alger	2012–13	Ligue 1	23	0	6	0	0	0	5 (Note: All appearance(s) in UAFA Club Cup)	0	34	0
USM Alger	2013–14	Ligue 1	23	0	1	0	—		0	0	24	0
USM Alger	2014–15	Ligue 1	25	2	3	0	4	1	1	0	33	3
USM Alger	2015–16	Ligue 1	26	0	0	0	7	0	—		33	0
USM Alger	2016–17	Ligue 1	22	1	2	0	5	0	1	0	30	1
USM Alger	2017–18	Ligue 1	18	1	1	0	10 (Note: four appearances in CAF Champions League, six appearances in CAF Confederation Cup)	0	—		29	1
USM Alger	2018–19	Ligue 1	20	2	3	0	4	0	4 (Note: All appearance(s) in Arab Club Champions Cup)	0	31	2
USM Alger	2019–20	Ligue 1	17	1	2	0	8	0	—		27	1
USM Alger	2020–21	Ligue 1	28	7	—		—		1	0	29	7
USM Alger	2021–22	Ligue 1	4	0	—		—		—		4	0
USM Alger	Total		206	14	19	0	38	1	12	0	275	15
Career total			330	19	28	2	52	1	17	0	427	22

== Honours ==
=== Club ===
MC Alger

- Algerian Ligue Professionnelle 1 : 2009-10
- Algerian Super Cup : 2007

USM Alger

- Algerian Ligue Professionnelle 1 : 2013-14, 2015-16, 2018–19
- Algerian Cup : 2013
- Algerian Super Cup : 2013, 2016
- UAFA Club Cup : 2013

== USM Alger coordinator ==
On June 22, 2024, The Board of Directors of USMA/SSPA met at the headquarters of the Groupe SERPORT, where it was decided to appoint the former Rouge et Noir player, Hamza Koudri as sports coordinator.
