= Farouk Chafaï =

Algerian footballer (born 1990)

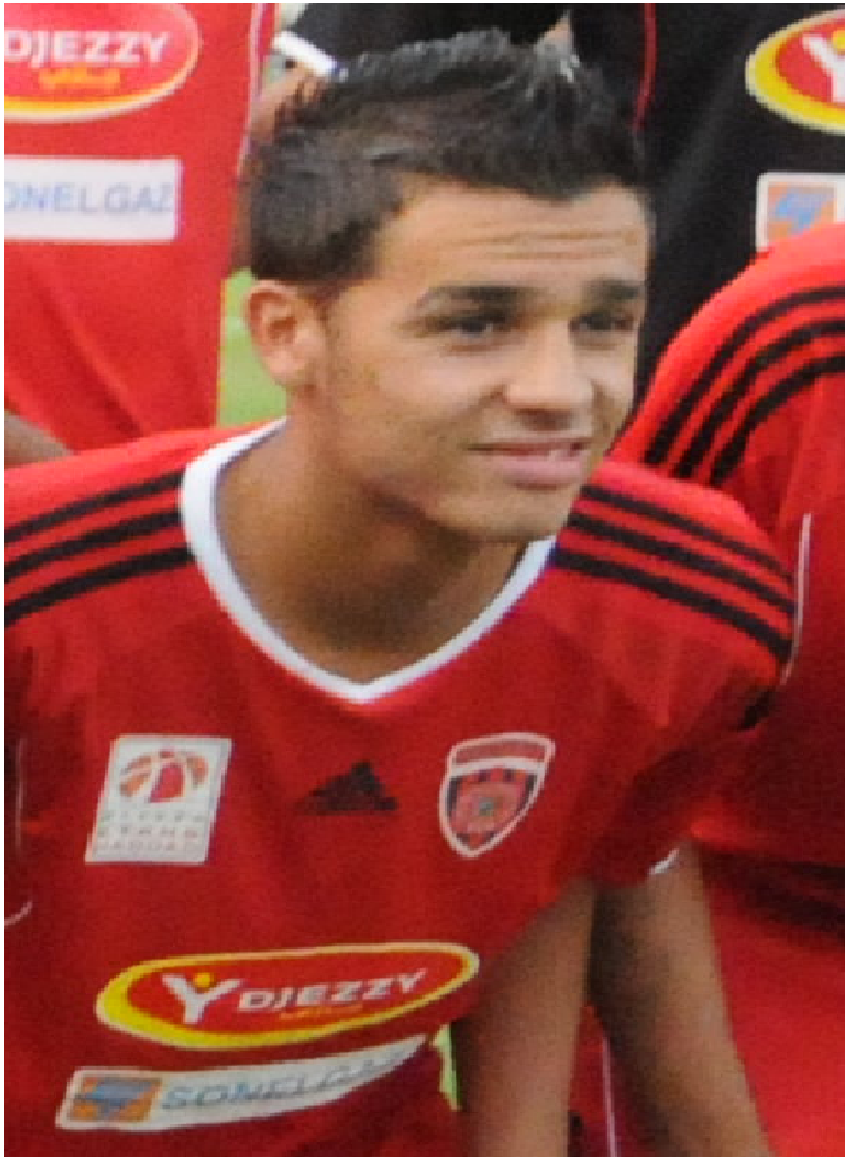
- Chafaï with USM Alger in 2012

Personal information
- Full name: Farouk Chafaï
- Date of birth: June 23, 1990 (age 36)
- Place of birth: Bologhine, Algeria
- Height: 1.82 m (6 ft 0 in)
- Position: Defender

Team information
- Current team: Al-Wehda
- Number: 5

Youth career
- 2005–2010: MC Alger

Senior career*
Years	Team	Apps	(Gls)
2010–2019	USM Alger	189	(27)
2019–2020	MC Alger	10	(1)
2020–2025	Damac	155	(21)
2026–	Al-Wehda	0	(0)

International career^{‡}
2011–2019	Algeria U23	5	(0)
2015–	Algeria	9	(1)
- * Club domestic league appearances and goals as of 26 May 2025 ‡ National team caps and goals as of 19 October 2019

Farouk Chafaï (Arabic: فاروق شافعي; born June 23, 1990) is an Algerian professional footballer who plays for Al-Wehda as a defender.

== Club career ==
In the summer of 2010, Chafaï left the junior ranks of MC Alger to join city rivals USM Alger, signing a four-year contract with the club.

On December 25, 2010, Chafaï made his professional debut for USM Alger in a league game against JS Kabylie. He started and played the whole game, as USMA lost 1–0.

== International career ==
On November 16, 2011, Chafaï was selected as part of Algeria's squad for the 2011 CAF U-23 Championship in Morocco. On August 8, 2012, Chafaï was called up by Algeria coach Vahid Halilhodžić for a 10-day training camp for local players. A few weeks later, he was called up to the Algeria national team for the first time for the 2013 Africa Cup of Nations qualifier against Libya.

== Career statistics ==
=== Club ===
As of match played 26 May 2025

Appearances and goals by club, season and competition
Club	Season	League			Cup		Continental		Other		Total	
Club	Season	Division	Apps	Goals	Apps	Goals	Apps	Goals	Apps	Goals	Apps	Goals
USM Alger	2010–11	Ligue 1	18	0	1	0	—		—		19	0
USM Alger	2011–12	Ligue 1	14	0	4	1	—		—		18	1
USM Alger	2012–13	Ligue 1	17	2	5	1	2 (Note: All appearance(s) in CAF Confederation Cup)	0	5 (Note: All appearance(s) in UAFA Club Cup)	1	29	4
USM Alger	2013–14	Ligue 1	25	5	2	0	—		1 (Note: All appearances in Algerian Super Cup)	0	28	5
USM Alger	2014–15	Ligue 1	22	0	3	1	4 (Note: All appearance(s) in Champions League)	2	1	0	30	3
USM Alger	2015–16	Ligue 1	23	3	1	0	7	0	—		31	3
USM Alger	2016–17	Ligue 1	25	3	2	0	7	3	1	1	35	7
USM Alger	2017–18	Ligue 1	24	3	2	0	11 (Note: five appearances in CAF Champions League, six appearances and one goal in CAF Confederation Cup)	1	—		37	4
USM Alger	2018–19	Ligue 1	21	1	1	0	6	1	3 (Note: All appearance(s) in Arab Club Champions Cup)	0	30	2
USM Alger	Total		189	17	21	3	37	7	11	2	258	29
MC Alger	2019–20	Ligue 1	10	1	—		—		3	0	13	1
Damac	2019–20	Saudi Professional League	17	3	—		—		—		17	3
Damac	2020–21	Saudi Professional League	29	6	1	0	—		—		30	6
Damac	2021–22	Saudi Professional League	23	1	1	0	—		—		24	1
Damac	2022–23	Saudi Professional League	27	3	1	0	—		—		28	3
Damac	2023–24	Saudi Professional League	28	5	2	0	—		—		30	5
Damac	2024–25	Saudi Professional League	31	3	1	0	—		—		32	3
Damac	Total		155	21	6	0	—		—		161	21
Career total			354	39	27	3	37	7	14	2	432	51

=== International ===
As of match played 19 October 2019

Appearances and goals by national team and year
National team	Year	Apps	Goals
Algeria	2012	0	0
Algeria	2015	1	0
Algeria	2017	2	0
Algeria	2018	4	1
Algeria	2019	2	0
Total		9	1

Scores and results list Algeria's goal tally first.

No	Date	Venue	Opponent	Score	Result	Competition
1.	27 March 2018	Liebenauer Stadium, Graz, Austria	Iran	1–2	1–2	Friendly

== Honours ==
USM Alger

- Algerian Ligue Professionnelle 1: 2013-14, 2015-16, 2018–19
- Algerian Cup: 2013
- Algerian Super Cup: 2013, 2016
- UAFA Club Cup: 2013

Individual

- Saudi Professional League Player of the Month: March 2021
