= Nicolas Campion =

French footballer (born 1983)

Personal information
- Date of birth: 15 January 1983 (age 43)
- Place of birth: Paris, France
- Height: 1.78 m (5 ft 10 in)
- Position: Midfielder

Youth career
- Troyes

Senior career*
Years	Team	Apps	(Gls)
2000–2004	Troyes B		
2004	Troyes	1	(1)
2004–2005	CO Châlons		
2005–2006	US Roye		
2006–2008	Villemomble Sports		
2008–2009	US Chantilly		
2009–2010	Villemomble Sports		
- * Club domestic league appearances and goals

Nicolas Campion (born 15 January 1983) is a French former professional footballer who played as a midfielder. He played at professional level in Ligue 2 for Troyes. Having previously played for CO Châlons and US Roye, he joined US Chantilly in October 2008.
