= Zinedine Ferhat =

Algerian footballer (born 1993)

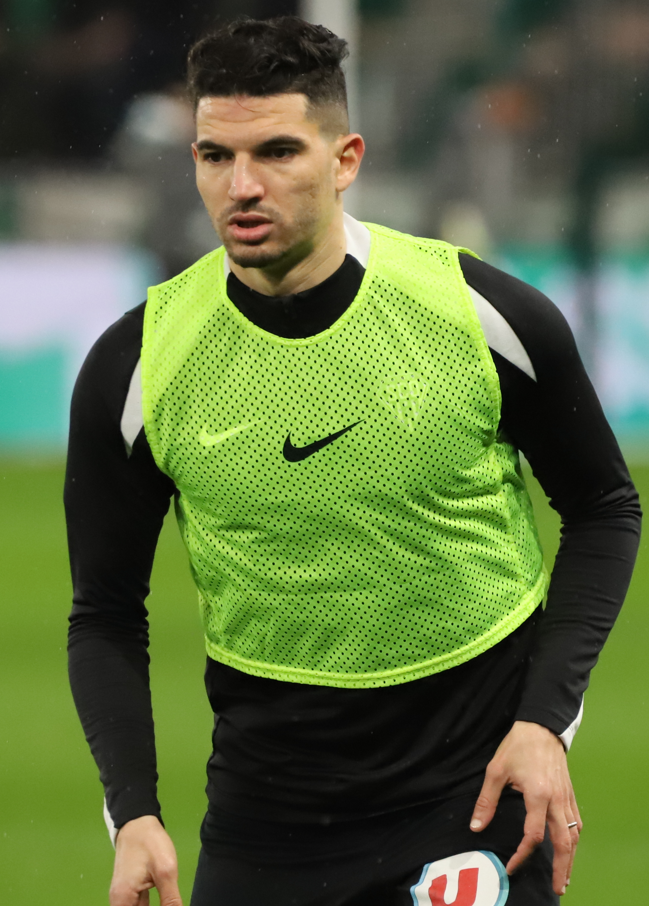
- Ferhat with Angers in 2025

Personal information
- Date of birth: 1 March 1993 (age 33)
- Place of birth: Bordj Menaïel, Algeria
- Height: 1.80 m (5 ft 11 in)
- Position: Midfielder

Team information
- Current team: MC Alger
- Number: 8

Youth career
- 2007–2008: JS Kabylie
- 2008–2011: AC FAF

Senior career*
Years	Team	Apps	(Gls)
2011–2016	USM Alger	106	(7)
2016–2019	Le Havre	104	(12)
2019–2022	Nîmes	73	(9)
2022–2023	Alanyaspor	23	(1)
2023–2025	Angers	49	(4)
2025-	MC Alger	28	(7)

International career
2010	Algeria U17	1	(1)
2010–2013	Algeria U20	17	(2)
2013	Algeria A'	1	(0)
2015–2016	Algeria U23	7	(2)
2013–2021	Algeria	13	(0)
- * Club domestic league appearances and goals as of 5 June 2026

Zinedine Ferhat (Arabic: زين الدين فرحات; born 1 March 1993) is an Algerian professional footballer who plays as a midfielder for MC Alger.

From 2013 to 2021, he played for the Algeria national team.

== Club career ==
=== USM Alger ===
On 19 November 2011, with the new coach Didier Ollé-Nicolle, Ferhat made his professional debut for USM Alger in a league game against JS Kabylie where he played the full 90 minutes. Then he participated in 19 games between the Ligue 1 and the cup, including six full 90-minute games and is a good outcome for his 18 years coming of the academy of FAF. The following season, he became a key player in the team where he participated in 30 matches and scored his first two goals was against CA Bordj Bou Arreridj on 2 February 2013. By the end of the season, Ferhat won his first two titles, the Algerian Cup and the UAFA Club Cup, and received the best young player award at the League.

In the 2013–14 season Ferhat began to receive special offers from French professional clubs, especially from Montpellier and former coach Rolland Courbis. where he presented a fabulous season contributed to the victory of USM Alger league title after nine years and also won the Super Cup at the end of the season participated Ferhat in 31 Match scored five goals and provided eight assists. The following season Ferhat was injured several times kept him out of several matches which reflected negatively on the team where he survived a fall in the last round after the piece and in the last season with the team Ferhat contributed to the arrival of USM Alger CAF Champions League Final for the first time, but were defeated against TP Mazembe, but with the end of the season won the last title with USM Alger, a title for the second time in its history, and with 10 assists.

=== Le Havre ===
On 13 June 2016, Ferhat signed for three years with French Ligue 2 club Le Havre. He made his debut on 29 July against Orléans playing 90 minutes. He scored his first goal on 3 February 2017 against Red Star.

Ferhat finished the 2017–18 Ligue 2 season as the top assister, setting a record with 20 assists in the season.

=== Nîmes ===
Ferhat joined Ligue 1 club Nîmes on 3 July 2019 as a free transfer following the expiry of his contract with Le Havre.

=== Alanyaspor ===
On 22 July 2022, Ferhat signed for Süper Lig club Alanyaspor on a two-year contract. He was given the number 10 shirt.

=== Angers ===
On 31 August 2023, Ferhat returned to France and signed a two-year contract with Angers.

== International career ==
On 24 March 2010, Ferhat was called up for the first time to the Algeria under-20 national team for the 2010 UNAF U-20 Tournament. On 26 March 2012, Ferhat was called up for the 2012 UNAF U-20 Tournament that was held in Algeria. He scored a penalty in the 27th minute against Morocco in the play-off for third place.

Ferhat was a member of the Algeria under-20 national team at the 2013 African U-20 Championship. Despite Algeria failing to progress past the group stage, Ferhat's performances earned him a place in the team of the tournament.

In November 2015, Ferhat was a member of the Algeria under-23 national team at the 2015 U-23 Africa Cup of Nations in Senegal.

== Career statistics ==
=== Club ===
As of match played 26 February 2022

Appearances and goals by club, season and competition
Club	Season	League			National Cup (Note: Includes the Coupe de France and Algerian Cup)		League Cup (Note: Includes the Coupe de la Ligue)		Continental		Other		Total	
Club	Season	Division	Apps	Goals	Apps	Goals	Apps	Goals	Apps	Goals	Apps	Goals	Apps	Goals
USM Alger	2011–12	Ligue 1	17	0	3	0	—		—		—		20	0
USM Alger	2012–13	Ligue 1	21	1	5	1	—		2 (Note: All appearance(s) in CAF Confederation Cup)	0	6 (Note: All appearance(s) in UAFA Club Cup)	0	34	2
USM Alger	2013–14	Ligue 1	29	5	1	0	—		—		1 (Note: All appearances in Algerian Super Cup)	0	31	5
USM Alger	2014–15	Ligue 1	19	1	2	0	—		2 (Note: All appearance(s) in CAF Champions League)	0	1	0	24	1
USM Alger	2015–16	Ligue 1	20	0	0	0	—		9	0	—		29	0
USM Alger	Total		106	7	11	1	—		13	0	8	0	138	8
Le Havre	2016–17	Ligue 2	34	3	3	0	1	0	—		—		38	3
Le Havre	2017–18	Ligue 2	35	4	0	0	2	1	—		2 (Note: All appearances in Ligue 2 play-offs)	0	39	5
Le Havre	2018–19	Ligue 2	35	5	2	0	5	0	—		—		42	5
Le Havre	Total		104	12	5	0	8	1	—		2	0	119	13
Nîmes	2019–20	Ligue 1	26	3	1	0	1	0	—		—		28	3
Nîmes	2020–21	Ligue 1	33	6	0	0	—		—		—		33	6
Nîmes	2021–22	Ligue 2	10	0	0	0	—		—		—		10	0
Nîmes	Total		69	9	1	0	1	0	—		—		71	9
Career total			279	28	17	1	9	1	13	0	10	0	328	30

== Honours ==
USM Alger

- Algerian Ligue Professionnelle 1: 2013–14, 2015–16
- Algerian Cup: 2013
- Algerian Super Cup: 2013
- UAFA Club Cup: 2013

Algeria U23

- Africa U-23 Cup of Nations runner-up: 2015
