= Karim Baïteche =

Algerian footballer (born 1991)

Personal information
- Full name: Karim Baïteche
- Date of birth: July 10, 1991 (age 35)
- Place of birth: Algiers, Algeria
- Position: Midfielder

Team information
- Current team: RC Kouba

Youth career
- USM Alger

Senior career*
Years	Team	Apps	(Gls)
2012–2016	USM Alger	42	(4)
2016–2017	CS Constantine	12	(0)
2017	JS Kabylie	8	(1)
2017–2018	USM El Harrach	10	(0)
2018–	JSM Béjaïa	10	(0)
2020–	RC Kouba	0	(0)
- * Club domestic league appearances and goals as of 00:50, December 28, 2017 (EST)

Karim Baïteche (Arabic: كريم بعيطش; born July 10, 1991) is an Algerian footballer who plays as a midfielder for RC Kouba in the Algerian Ligue 2.

== Club ==
As of 28 December 2017

Club	Season	League		Cup		Continental		Other		Total	
Club	Season	Apps	Goals	Apps	Goals	Apps	Goals	Apps	Goals	Apps	Goals
USM Alger	2012–13	1	0	0	0	0	0	—		1	0
USM Alger	2013–14	15	1	1	0	—		1	0	17	1
USM Alger	2014–15	18	2	0	0	5	0	0	0	23	2
USM Alger	2015–16	8	1	0	0	5	1	—		13	2
USM Alger	Total	42	4	1	0	10	1	1	0	53	5
CS Constantine	2016–17	12	0	1	0	—		—		13	0
JS Kabylie	2016–17	8	1	0	0	5	0	—		13	1
USM El Harrach	2017–18	10	0	0	0	—		—		10	0
Career total		72	5	2	0	15	1	1	0	90	6

== Honours ==
=== Club ===
USM Alger

- Algerian Ligue Professionnelle 1 (2): 2013-14, 2015-16
- Algerian Cup (1): 2013
- Algerian Super Cup (1): 2013
- UAFA Club Cup (1): 2013
