= Brahim Boudebouda =

Algerian footballer (born 1990)

Personal information
- Full name: Brahim Boudebouda
- Date of birth: 28 August 1990 (age 36)
- Place of birth: Algiers, Algeria
- Height: 1.83 m (6 ft 0 in)
- Position: Left back

Team information
- Current team: RC Kouba
- Number: 4

Senior career*
Years	Team	Apps	(Gls)
2008–2011	MC Alger	58	(7)
2011–2012	Le Mans	10	(2)
2012–2016	USM Alger	76	(9)
2016–2018	MC Alger	35	(3)
2018–2019	MC Oran	18	(2)
2019–2021	CS Constantine	19	(3)
2021–	RC Kouba	0	(0)

International career
2007–2008	Algeria U20	5	(0)
2009–2011	Algeria U23	6	(1)
2013	Algeria A'	1	(0)
2015	Algeria	1	(0)
- * Club domestic league appearances and goals as of 23:57, 1 January 2020 (UTC)

Brahim Boudebouda (Arabic: ابراهيم بدبودة; born 28 August 1990) is an Algerian footballer who current plays as a left back for Algerian Ligue 2 club RC Kouba.

== Club career ==
=== MC Alger ===
On 25 February 2008 Boudebouda, just 17 years old at the time, made his professional debut for MC Alger in the local derby against USM Alger in Koléa, coming on as a substitute for Smaïl Chaoui in the 63rd minute. MC Alger went on to win the game 1–0.

In the 2009–2010 season, Boudebouda made 16 appearances and scored 2 goals for MC Alger as they won the league title for the first time since 1999.

On 3 April 2011 Boudebouda helped MC Alger qualify to the second round of the 2011 CAF Champions League with two goals in a 3–0 win against Zimbabwean side Dynamos F.C. He was decisive again in the second round, with an 89th-minute winner against Inter Luanda of Angola, as MC Alger won 3–2 and advanced to the group stage.

On 10 May 2011 Boudebouda went on trial with Belgian side Germinal Beerschot.

=== Le Mans FC ===
On 3 July 2011 it was announced that Boudebouda would be joining French Ligue 2 side Le Mans FC after agreeing to a three-year contract. On 6 July 2011 the move was made official. On 9 August 2011 Bedbouda made his debut for the club as a starter in a 2011–12 Coupe de la Ligue match against Istres. He played the entire match as Le Mans won 2–0. On 12 June 2012 Boudebouda reached a mutual agreement with Le Mans to terminate his contract.

=== USM Alger ===
On 13 June 2012, one day after terminating his contract with Le Mans, Boudebouda signed a two-year contract with USM Alger.

=== Statistics ===
As of 28 August 2011

Club performance			League		Cup		Continental		Total	
Season	Club	League	Apps	Goals	Apps	Goals	Apps	Goals	Apps	Goals
Algeria			League		Algerian Cup		Africa		Total	
2007–08	MC Alger	Algerian Ligue Professionnelle 1	1	0	0	0	1	0	2	0
2008–09	MC Alger	Algerian Ligue Professionnelle 1	16	0	0	0	0	0	16	0
2009–10	MC Alger	Algerian Ligue Professionnelle 1	17	3	4	1	0	0	21	4
2010–11	MC Alger	Algerian Ligue Professionnelle 1	24	4	2	0	3	3	29	7
France			League		Coupe de France		Coupe de la Ligue		Total	
2011–12	Le Mans FC	Ligue 2	3	1	0	0	1	0	4	1
Total	Algeria		58	7	6	1	4	3	68	11
Total	France		3	1	0	0	1	0	4	1
Career total			61	8	6	1	5	3	72	12

== International career ==
He was member of the team at the 2010 UNAF U-23 Tournament in Morocco, where the team finished first. Boudebouda scored a goal in the final group game against Libya.

== Honours ==
=== Club ===
USM Alger

- Algerian Ligue Professionnelle 1 (2): 2013-14, 2015-16
- Algerian Cup (1): 2013
- Algerian Super Cup (1): 2013
- UAFA Club Cup (1): 2013

MC Alger

- Algerian Ligue Professionnelle 1 (1): 2009-10
- Algerian Super Cup (1): 2007
