= Hocine El Orfi =

Algerian footballer (born 1987)

Personal information
- Full name: Hocine El Orfi
- Date of birth: January 27, 1987 (age 39)
- Place of birth: Bou Saâda, Algeria
- Position: Defensive midfielder

Youth career
- A Bou Saâda

Senior career*
Years	Team	Apps	(Gls)
2006–2007	A Bou Saâda	-	(-)
2007–2012	Paradou AC	-	(-)
2010–2012	→ JS Kabylie (loan)	45	(0)
2012–2016	USM Alger	61	(0)
2016–2019	NA Hussein Dey		
2019–2020	NC Magra		
2020	Al-Mujazzal		
2020–2022	NA Hussein Dey		

International career^{‡}
2013–	Algeria	1	(0)
- * Club domestic league appearances and goals as of 00:00, June 16, 2016 (EST) ‡ National team caps and goals as of 00:00, June 16, 2016 (EST)

Hocine El Orfi (born January 27, 1987) is an Algerian footballer. He plays mainly as a defensive midfielder.

== Club career ==
Born in Bou Saâda, El Orfi began his career in the youth ranks of his hometown club, Amel Bou Saâda, eventually making his way to the first team. In 2007, he signed for Paradou AC.

=== JS Kabylie ===
On June 4, 2010, El Orfi was loaned out by Paradou AC to JS Kabylie for one season. On May 1, 2011, El Orfi started for JS Kabylie in the 2011 Algerian Cup Final where they beat USM El Harrach 1–0 to win the trophy. In June 2011, his loan was extended for another season.

=== USM Alger ===
In the summer of 2012, El Orfi joined USM Alger from Paradou AC, signing a two-year contract. The transfer fee was not disclosed. On September 15, he made his debut for the club as starter in the first week encounter of the 2012–13 Algerian Ligue Professionnelle 1 against CS Constantine.

== International career ==
On October 3, 2012, El Orfi received his first official call-up to the Algeria national football team for the return leg of the 2013 Africa Cup of Nations qualifier against Libya.

== Honours ==
=== Club ===
USM Alger

- Algerian Ligue Professionnelle 1 (2): 2013-14, 2015-16
- Algerian Cup (1): 2013
- Algerian Super Cup (1): 2013
- UAFA Club Cup (1): 2013

JS Kabylie

- Algerian Cup (1): 2011
