= Hubert Velud =

French footballer (born 1959)

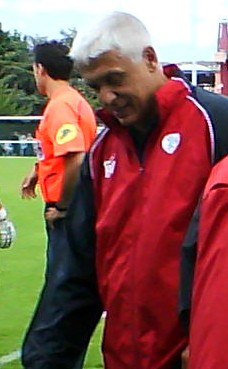
- Velud with Créteil in 2010

Personal information
- Date of birth: 8 June 1959 (age 67)
- Place of birth: Villefranche-sur-Saône, France
- Height: 1.79 m (5 ft 10 in)
- Position: Goalkeeper

Team information
- Current team: Comoros (head coach)

Youth career
- 1967–1969: US Anse
- 1969–1976: Villefranche
- 1976–1979: Reims

Senior career*
Years	Team	Apps	(Gls)
1979–1989	Reims		
1989–1990	Châlons-sur-Marne		
1990–1991	Gap		

Managerial career
- 1989–1990: Châlons-sur-Marne
- 1990–1991: Gap
- 1992: Paris FC
- 1995–1999: Paris FC
- 2000–2001: Gazélec
- 2001–2004: Clermont
- 2004–2005: Cherbourg
- 2005–2006: Créteil
- 2006–2007: Toulon
- 2008–2009: Beauvais
- 2009–2010: Togo
- 2010–2011: Créteil
- 2011–2012: Hassania Agadir
- 2012: Stade Tunisien
- 2012–2013: ES Sétif
- 2013–2015: USM Alger
- 2015: CS Constantine
- 2016: TP Mazembe
- 2017: Étoile du Sahel
- 2018: Kuwait SC
- 2018–2019: Difaâ Hassani El Jadidi
- 2019–2020: JS Kabylie
- 2020–2021: Sudan
- 2022–2024: Burkina Faso
- 2024: AS FAR
- 2025: MC Oran
- 2026–: Comoros
- * Club domestic league appearances and goals

Hubert Velud (born 8 June 1959) is a French football manager and former player, who is currently the manager of Comoros national football team.

== Playing career ==
Velud was born in Villefranche-sur-Saône. As a goalkeeper, he played for Reims, Châlons-sur-Marne and Gap.

== Coaching career ==
Velud coached has Châlons-sur-Marne, Gap, Paris FC, Gazélec, Clermont, Cherbourg, Créteil, Toulon, and Beauvais. He has also managed the Togo national football team from 2009 to 2010. Velud was shot in the arm in a January 2010 attack by Angolan rebels on the team bus while traveling with Togo's national football team to the 2010 African Cup of Nations.

He later returned to Créteil, then ventured to Morocco with Hassania Agadir, Tunisia with Stade Tunisien, and Algeria with ES Sétif, USM Alger, in which he won two consecutive Ligue 1 titles, and CS Constantine.

In 2016, he took charge of TP Mazembe, securing four titles, including Linafoot, DR Congo Super Cup, Confederation Cup and CAF Super Cup.

His next stop was Tunisian club Étoile du Sahel, guiding them to the semi-finals of the 2017 CAF Champions League, followed by a stint with Kuwait SC starting from May 2018. However, FIFA's suspension of their respective football association prevented them from participating in both AFC Champions League and Arab Club Championship. He then returned to North Africa, coaching Difaâ Hassani El Jadidi and JS Kabylie.

In January 2020, he assumed the role of manager for Sudan, leading them to a second-place finish in their group during the 2021 Africa Cup of Nations qualification, and securing participation in the final tournament in Cameroon. However, disappointing performances in the 2021 FIFA Arab Cup and 2022 FIFA World Cup qualification, led to his dismissal in December 2021, despite the opportunity to lead Sudan during the 2021 Africa Cup of Nations.

In April 2022, Velud was hired to coach Burkina Faso, where he led them to reach the round of 16 during the 2023 Africa Cup of Nations, before parting ways by mutual consent in February 2024.

== Honours ==
Clermont

- Championnat National: 2001–02

ES Sétif

- Ligue 1: 2012–13

USM Alger

- Algerian Super Cup: 2013
- Ligue 1: 2013–14

TP Mazembe

- Linafoot: 2015–16
- DR Congo Super Cup: 2016
- CAF Confederation Cup: 2016
- CAF Super Cup: 2016

Individual

- Best Coach in the Algerian Ligue 1: 2012–13, 2013–14
