= Nassim Bouchema =

Algerian football player (born 1988)

Personal information
- Full name: Nassim Bouchema
- Date of birth: 5 May 1988 (age 38)
- Place of birth: Algiers, Algeria
- Position: Midfielder

Team information
- Current team: MO Béjaïa
- Number: 5

Youth career
- 2001–2006: USM Alger
- 2006–2007: MC Alger

Senior career*
Years	Team	Apps	(Gls)
2007–2011	MC Alger	68	(4)
2011–2016	USM Alger	106	(5)
2016–2017	CR Belouizdad	7	(1)
2017–	MO Béjaïa	11	(1)

International career
2013–	Algeria A'	1	(0)
- * Club domestic league appearances and goals as of 26 February 2018

Nassim Bouchema (born 5 May 1988) is an Algerian football player. He plays for MO Béjaïa in the Algerian Ligue Professionnelle 1.

== Club career ==
Bouchema began his career in the junior ranks of USM Alger in 2001. In the summer of 2006, he followed his coach at USM Alger, Aïssa Slimani, to join MC Alger. In his first season with MC Alger, he finished as the top scorer in his age category, netting 22 goals.

On 15 July 2011 Bouchema signed a two-year contract with USM Alger, joining them on a free transfer from local rivals MC Alger. Two days later, he was attacked by an MC Alger fan, who struck him in the arm with a knife, requiring the player to get seven stitches.

== Honours ==
=== Club ===
USM Alger

- Algerian Ligue Professionnelle 1 (2): 2013-14, 2015-16
- Algerian Cup (1): 2013
- Algerian Super Cup (1): 2013
- UAFA Club Cup (1): 2013

MC Alger

- Algerian Ligue Professionnelle 1 (1): 2009-10
