= Noui Laïfa =

French footballer (born 1986)

Personal information
- Date of birth: 23 July 1986 (age 40)
- Place of birth: Les Ulis, France
- Height: 1.82 m (5 ft 11 1/2 in)
- Position: Defensive midfielder

Team information
- Current team: Sainte-Geneviève
- Number: 28

Youth career
- 1994–1998: AS Évry
- 1998–2001: CSF Brétigny
- 2001–2002: Louhans-Cuiseaux
- 2002–2004: US Palaiseau
- 2004–2005: Les Ulis

Senior career*
Years	Team	Apps	(Gls)
2005–2008	Les Ulis	0	(0)
2008–2009	Sainte-Geneviève	21	(2)
2009–2010	Alfortville	35	(2)
2010–2012	Créteil	62	(6)
2012–2013	Gazélec Ajaccio	32	(4)
2013–2014	Paris FC	30	(1)
2014–2015	SR Colmar	0	(0)
2015–2022	FC Fleury 91	145	(9)
2022–	Sainte-Geneviève	39	(1)
- * Club domestic league appearances and goals as of 7 December 2024

Noui Laïfa (born 23 July 1986) is a French football player who plays for Championnat National 3 club Sainte-Geneviève. He plays as a defensive midfielder often playing in a withdrawn position as a deep-lying playmaker.

== Career ==
Laïfa joined Créteil from amateur rivals and Championnat de France amateur club UJA Alfortville and signed a one-year contract with a club option for a second year.

Laïfa began his career in Évry-Grégy-sur-Yerre, a commune in the Île-de-France region, playing for local club AS Évry. He later had stints at CSF Brétigny, the same club that produced French internationals Patrice Evra and Jimmy Briand, CS Louhans-Cuiseaux, and US Palaiseau before finally settling down at hometown club CO Les Ulis. At Les Ulis, Laïfa appeared with the under-19 team that reached the Round of 32 in the Coupe Gambardella in 2005. With the senior team of Les Ulis, he played on teams in the Division d'Excellence and Promotion d'Honneur of the Île-de-France. In 2008, Laïfa joined Championnat de France amateur club Sainte-Geneviève Sports and had a solid season appearing in 21 league matches scoring two goals. The club, however, finished last in their division thus being relegated to the fifth division. Laïfa remained in the fourth division the following season signing with UJA Alfortville. He appeared in 35 matches with the club scoring two goals. Following the season, Laïfa signed with Créteil.

After his first season as a professional player with Ajaccio, Laïfa left the relegated Corsican team and came back in the Paris region, signing a one-year contract with National club Paris FC.

Laïfa holds French and Algerian nationalities.
