= Akim Orinel =

French footballer (born 1986)

Personal information
- Full name: Mickaël Akim Orinel
- Date of birth: 27 July 1986 (age 40)
- Place of birth: Arles, France
- Height: 1.71 m (5 ft 7 in)
- Position: Midfielder

Youth career
- 2000–2006: Saint-Étienne

Senior career*
| Years | Team | Apps | (Gls) |
| 2006–2008 | Orléans | 59 | (8) |
| 2008–2011 | Fréjus Saint-Raphaël | 90 | (9) |
| 2011–2013 | Châteauroux | 65 | (6) |
| 2012 | Châteauroux B | 2 | (2) |
| 2013–2014 | Fréjus Saint-Raphaël | 30 | (0) |
| 2014–2015 | USM Alger | 2 | (0) |
| 2015–2025 | Fréjus Saint-Raphaël | 229 | (25) |
- * Club domestic league appearances and goals as of 17 May 2025

Mickaël Akim Orinel (born 27 July 1986) is a French professional footballer who plays as a midfielder.

== Career ==
Born in Arles and of Algerian descent, Orinel began his career in the youth ranks of Saint-Étienne. In 2006, he left the club and joined CFA side Orléans. After two seasons at the club, he signed with another CFA side, Fréjus Saint-Raphaël. He spent three seasons at the club, including winning promotion to the Championnat National.

On 5 May 2011, Orinel signed a two-year contract with Ligue 2 side Châteauroux.
