= Ernest Nsombo =

Cameroonian footballer

Personal information
- Full name: Ernest Nsombo
- Date of birth: March 6, 1991 (age 35)
- Place of birth: Douala, Cameroon
- Position: Striker

Team information
- Current team: USM Alger
- Number: 19

Senior career*
Years	Team	Apps	(Gls)
–2014	Astres FC		
2014–2015	USM Alger	10	(2)
2015–	ASTRES DE DOUALA	35	(15)
- * Club domestic league appearances and goals as of September 30, 2016

Ernest Nsombo (born March 6, 1991) is a Cameroonian footballer, who plays as a striker for USM Alger.

== Honours ==
- USM Alger
  - Algerian Ligue Professionnelle 1
    - Winner: 2013–14
