= CO Châlons =

French football club

Club Olympique Châlons-en-Champagne was a French association football club. However, they became defunct at the end of the 2005–06 season. They were based in Châlons-en-Champagne, Champagne-Ardenne, France and played in the Championnat de France Amateurs 2 Group C, the fifth tier in the French football league system. They played at the Stade René Saché in Châlons-en-Champagne, which has a capacity of 1,500.

For the 2006–07 season, they were replaced by a new team, Olympique Châlons. This team is currently playing in the Division d'Honneur Régional de Champagne-Ardenne Group B, which is the 7th tier of French football.
