= Sid Ahmed Rafik Mazouzi =

Algerian footballer (born 1989)

Rafik Mazouzi
Personal information
- Full name: Sid Ahmed Rafik Mazouzi
- Date of birth: February 1, 1989 (age 37)
- Place of birth: Algiers, Algeria
- Position: Goalkeeper

Youth career
- USM El Harrach
- USM Alger

Senior career*
Years	Team	Apps	(Gls)
2007–2011	USM Alger	1	(0)
2011–2013	→ WA Tlemcen (loan)	35	(0)
2013–2014	USM Alger	1	(0)
2014–2015	RC Arbaâ	7	(0)
2015–2017	CA Batna		
2017–2018	USM El Harrach	15	(0)
2018–2020	MC Oran	19	(0)
2020–202?	MC El Eulma		

International career
2008	Algeria U20	1	(0)
2010	Algeria U23	16	(0)
- * Club domestic league appearances and goals as of 17:52, 14 July 2024 (UTC)

Sid Ahmed Rafik Mazouzi (born February 1, 1989) is an Algerian football player who plays as a goalkeeper.

== International career ==
On November 16, 2011, Mazouzi was selected as part of Algeria's squad for the 2011 CAF U-23 Championship in Morocco.
