= 2013 Algerian Super Cup =

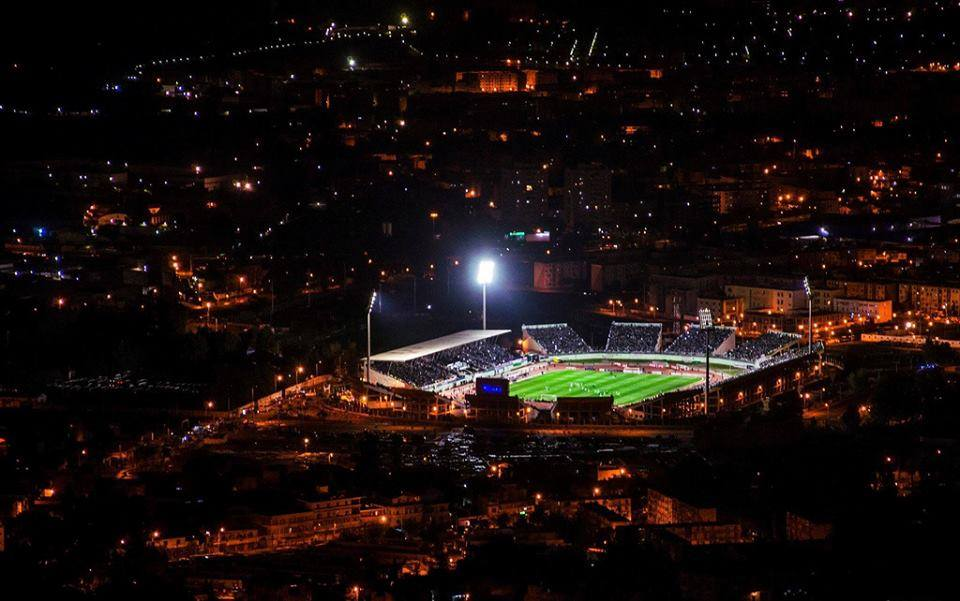
- Mustapha Tchaker Stadium hosted the match
ES Sétif	USM Alger
Ligue 1	Algerian Cup
0	2
- Date: 11 January 2014
- Venue: Mustapha Tchaker Stadium, Blida
- Referee: Mohamed Bichari
- Attendance: 14.312

The 2013 Algerian Super Cup is the 7th edition of Algerian Super Cup, a football match contested by the winners of the Ligue 1 and 2012–13 Algerian Cup competitions. The match was played on 11 January 2014 at Mustapha Tchaker Stadium in Blida. Algerian Cup winners USM Alger defeated Ligue 1 winners ES Sétif with a score of 2-0.

== Match details ==
11 January 2014
16:00

ES Sétif	0–2	USM Alger
	Report	8' Ziaya; 40' Andria

Mustapha Tchaker Stadium, Blida
Attendance: 14.312
Referee: Mohamed Bichari

GK	1	(Algeria) Sofiane Khedairia
RB	3	(Algeria) Riad Benchadi (c)	(substituted off) 46'
CB	27	(Algeria) Farès Benabderahmane
CB	15	(Algeria) Abdelghani Demmou
LB	4	(Algeria) Kheireddine Arroussi
CM	18	(Algeria) Hameur Bouazza
CM	7	(Algeria) Khaled Gourmi
CM	14	(Algeria) Amir Karaoui		(yellow card) 45'
RF	26	(Algeria) Toufik Zerara
CF	22	(Gabon) Benjamin Ze Ondo	(substituted off) 61'
LF	57	(Algeria) El Hedi Belameiri	(substituted off) 61'
Substitutes:
DF	18	(Algeria) Lyes Boukria	(substituted on) 46'
FW	10	(Algeria) Akram Djahnit	(substituted on) 61'
MF	16	(Algeria) Rachid Ferrahi	(substituted on) 61'	(yellow card) 76'
Manager:
(Algeria) Kheïreddine Madoui

GK	1	(Algeria) Lamine Zemmamouche
DF	30	(Algeria) Rabie Meftah
DF	20	(Algeria) Nacereddine Khoualed (c)
DF	25	(Algeria) Mokhtar Benmoussa
DF	6	(Algeria) Farouk Chafaï
MF	13	(Algeria) Nassim Bouchema
MF	11	(Algeria) Hocine El Orfi
MF	15	(Algeria) Bouazza Feham
MF	47	(Algeria) Zinedine Ferhat
FW	9	(Algeria) Abdelmalek Ziaya	8'	(substituted off) 69'
FW	2	(Madagascar) Carolus Andriamatsinoro	40'	(substituted off) 84'
Substitutes:
FW	8	(Algeria) Ahmed Gasmi		(substituted on) 69'
MF	28	(Algeria) Karim Baïteche		(substituted on) 84'
Manager:
(France) Hubert Velud

== See also ==
- 2012–13 Algerian Ligue Professionnelle 1
- 2012–13 Algerian Cup
