= Youcef Benamara =

Algerian football player (born 1984)

Personal information
- Full name: Youcef Benamara
- Date of birth: April 24, 1984 (age 42)
- Place of birth: Guelma, Algeria
- Position: Defender

Team information
- Current team: ASM Oran
- Number: 4

Senior career*
Years	Team	Apps	(Gls)
2008–2010	JSM Skikda	-	(-)
2010–2012	CA Batna	-	(-)
2012–2014	USM Alger	19	(0)
2014–2015	JS Kabylie	23	(0)
2015–2016	USM Blida	21	(0)
2016–2017	NA Hussein Dey	21	(0)
2017–2018	US Biskra	?	(0)
2018–	ASM Oran	?	(0)
- * Club domestic league appearances and goals as of 00:00, August 1, 2018 (EST)

Youcef Benamara (born April 24, 1984) is an Algerian football player who plays for ASM Oran in the Algerian Ligue Professionnelle 2.
