= 2012–13 Algerian Cup =

- Stade du 5 Juillet hosted the final

Tournament details
- Country: Algeria
- Teams: 64 (as of first national round)

Final positions
- Champions: USM Alger (8th title)
- Runners-up: MC Alger

Tournament statistics
- Top goal scorer(s): Islam Slimani (4 goals); Moustafa Djallit (4 goals); Nasreddine El Bahari (4 goals); Mohamed Benyettou (4 goals)

The 2012–13 Algerian Cup was the 49th edition of the Algerian Cup. The winners were USM Alger who qualified for the 2014 CAF Confederation Cup.

== Round of 64 ==
The round of 64 is the first national round of the Algerian Cup. On November 26, 2012, the draw for the rounds of 64 and 32 were held at a ceremony at the Sheraton Hotel in Algiers.

Tie no	Home team	Score	Away team
1	MC El Eulma	1-0	GC Mascara
2	JS Kabylie	3-1 (a.e.t)	NARB Réghaïa
3	US Chaouia	1-1 (2-4 P)	MC Alger
4	Paradou AC	2-3	ES Sétif
5	JSM Béjaïa	2-1	ASM Oran
6	IB Mouzaia	2-0	JS Bouakeul
7	IRB El Hadjar	3-1	JSM Tiaret
8	CA Bordj Bou Arréridj	2-1	WRB Msila
9	CC Sig	2-1 (a.e.t)	IRB Robah
10	JSM Skikda	1-4	MC Oran
11	JSM Cheraga	1-0	CS Hamma Loulou
12	JS Ghir Abadla	0-5	MB Rouissat
13	USM Annaba	0-3	CS Constantine
14	IRB El Kerma	0-5	NA Hussein Dey
15	USM Bel-Abbès	4-1 (a.e.t)	US Doucen
16	USM Blida	2-1	Olympique de Médéa
17	CRB Dar El Beida	0-1	MO Béjaïa
18	Hamra Annaba	1-0	CRB Mazouna
19	AS Khroub	1-0	ES Mostaganem
20	CR Zoubiria	0-3	OM Arzew
21	MSP Batna	0-1	WA Tlemcen
22	MB Bouira	0-6	ASO Chlef
23	JJ Azzaba	5-1	NT Souf
24	AB Merouana	2-1 (a.e.t)	IRB Lakhdaria
25	CRB Bougtob	0-1	USM El Harrach
26	JS Saoura	0-1	USM Alger
27	WM Tebessa	0-2	CA Batna
28	NRB Touggourt	1-0	CRB Ain Turk
29	USM Aïn Beïda	1-0	NRB Achir
30	CR Belouizdad	5-0	MC Debdaba
31	CRB Ain Fakroun	1-0	RC Oued Rhiou
32	WA Boufarik	1-1 (3-5 P)	AS Ain M'lila

== Round of 32 ==
The round of 32 was held on the 28th and 29 December 2012.

Tie no	Home team	Score	Away team
1	USM Blida	2 – 0	CA Bordj Bou Arréridj
2	CC Sig	0 – 5	USM Alger
3	CS Constantine	5 – 1	USM Bel-Abbès
4	MC Alger	0 – 0 (7 – 6 P)	JS Kabylie
5	USM Aïn Beïda	5 – 1	IB Mouzaia
6	MB Rouissat	2 – 2 (4 – 5 P)	ASO Chlef
7	USM El Harrach	4 – 2	MC El Eulma
8	WA Tlemcen	2 – 1	JJ Azzaba
9	JSM Cheraga	1 – 0	Hamra Annaba
10	OM Arzew	0 – 3	CRB Ain Fakroun
11	NA Hussein Dey	1 – 0	AB Merouana
12	ES Sétif	2 – 1	NRB Touggourt
13	CA Batna	0 – 1	MO Béjaïa
14	AS Ain M'lila	0 – 0 (5 – 4 P)	AS Khroub
15	CR Belouizdad	1 – 0	JSM Béjaïa
16	MC Oran	4 – 1	IRB El Hadjar

== Round of 16 ==
The draw for the round of 16 was held on January 8.

Tie no	Home team	Score	Away team
1	MC Oran	2 – 0	ASO Chlef
2	CS Constantine	3 – 1	USM Blida
3	NA Hussein Dey	2 – 1	MO Béjaïa
4	CRB Aïn Fakroun	0 – 1	CR Belouizdad
5	USM Alger	1 – 0	USM El Harrach
6	MC Alger	3 – 0	USM Aïn Beïda
7	JSM Chéraga	0 – 3	ES Sétif
8	WA Tlemcen	1 – 1 (3 – 2 P)	AS Aïn M'lila

== Quarter-finals ==
Tie no	Home team	Score	Away team
1	MC Oran	3 – 1	WA Tlemcen
2	MC Alger	3 – 0	CS Constantine
3	USM Alger	2 – 1	NA Hussein Dey
4	ES Sétif	2 – 1	CR Belouizdad

== Semi-finals ==
Tie no	Home team	Score	Away team	Stadium
1	MC Alger	3 – 2	ES Sétif	Stade 5 Juillet 1962, Algiers
2	MC Oran	0 – 1	USM Alger	Stade Ahmed Zabana, Oran

=== Matches ===
April 12, 2013

MC Alger	3 – 2	ES Sétif
Bouguèche 7'; Djallit 21' (pen.); Besseghir 31'	Report	Nadji 15'; Djahnit 76'

Stade 5 Juillet 1962, Algiers
Referee: Mehdi Abid Charef

April 13, 2013

MC Oran	0 – 1	USM Alger
	Report	Daham 18'

Stade Ahmed Zabana, Oran
Referee: Redouane Necib

== Final ==
Tie no	Home team	Score	Away team	Stadium
1	MC Alger	0 – 1	USM Alger	Stade 5 Juillet 1962, Algiers

=== Matches ===
May 1, 2013

MC Alger	0–1	USM Alger
		Mokhtar Benmoussa 17'

Stade 5 Juillet 1962, Algiers
Referee: Djamel Haïmoudi
