= 2018–19 USM Alger season =

USM Alger
2018–19 season
- Owner: Ali Haddad (until 29 April 2019); Boualem Chendri (from 29 April 2019)
- Chairman: Abdelhakim Serrar
- Head coach: Miloud Hamdi (until 20 May 2018); Thierry Froger (from 19 June 2018) (until 14 March 2019); Lamine Kebir (C) (from 23 March 2018)
- Stadium: Omar Hamadi Stadium; July 5, 1962 Stadium
- Ligue 1: 1st
- Algerian Cup: Round of 16
- Confederation Cup: Quarter-finals
- Club Championship: Second round
- Top goalscorer: League: Prince Ibara (9 goals); All: Prince Ibara (10 goals)
- Biggest win: 5–1 (vs. MO Béjaïa – 15 October 2018)
- Biggest defeat: 1–4 (vs. Al-Merrikh – 21 November 2018)

In the 2018–19 season, USM Alger competed in the Ligue 1 for the 41st season, as well as the Confederation Cup, Club Championship, and the Algerian Cup. It was their 24th consecutive season in the top flight of Algerian football.

== Season summary ==
With the end of the 2017–18 season USM Alger started looking for a new coach and the squad saw the departure of many players, most notably Ayoub Abdellaoui, who joined the Swiss club FC Sion. and striker Oussama Darfalou, who joined Dutch club Vitesse. finally, after a month of research, the team contracted with French technical Thierry Froger to be the new coach. This season USM Alger is competing on four fronts Ligue 1, Algerian Cup, Confederation Cup and Arab Club Champions Cup, The first goals was to win the Confederation Cup, but they are eliminated in the quarter-finals against the Egyptian club Al-Masry. Then in the Arab Club Champions Cup was the ambition to win, especially that the value of financial prizes exceed 15 million dollars. more than the CAF Champions League, but the march of The Reds and Blacks stopped in the second round against the Sudanese Al-Merrikh 4–3 on aggregate. then moved USM Alger's attention to the Ligue 1 Leader in the standings, the USMA counts 33 units and ensures at the same time to finish first at the end of the first phase of the championship Followed by JS Kabylie.

The season was tough on all counts and I took my responsibilities to the end. Now it's time for me to pull out and officially announce it: I will not be the CEO of USMA next year.

— Abdelhakim Serrar a statement about his resignation.

After the outbreak of protests in Algeria and the arrest of club owner Ali Haddad on corruption charges. affected the results of USM Alger where he was defeated in three consecutive games, all Darby matches against Paradou AC, MC Alger and CR Belouizdad to shrink the difference to one point from the runner-up four games before the end of the season. On April 30, 2019, The board of the SSPA USMA met and noted the vacancy of the post of president of the company since the incarceration of Ali Haddad there is nearly a month. It was Boualem Chendri who was unanimously elected to succeed him while ETRHB Haddad remains the majority shareholder of the club. On May 26, 2019, And after the victory outside the home against CS Constantine 3–1 achieved the eighth Ligue 1 title, one point behind JS Kabylie. immediately after the end of the game Abdelhakim Serrar announced his resignation from his office.

== Squad list ==
Players and squad numbers last updated on 26 May 2019.
Note: Flags indicate national team as has been defined under FIFA eligibility rules. Players may hold more than one non-FIFA nationality.

No.	Name	Nat.	Position	Date of Birth (Age)	Signed from	Signed in	Contract ends	Apps	Goals
Goalkeepers
1	Lamine Zemmamouche (C)	(Algeria)	GK	19 March 1985 (aged 33)	(Algeria) MC Alger	2012	2020	357	1
16	Ismaïl Mansouri	(Algeria)	GK	7 January 1988 (aged 30)	(Algeria) MO Béjaïa	2008	2019	69	0
30	Mourad Berrefane	(Algeria)	GK	18 March 1986 (aged 32)	(Algeria) MO Béjaïa	2014	2018	28	0
Defenders
5	Mohamed Benyahia	(Algeria)	CB	30 June 1992 (aged 26)	(Algeria) MC Oran	2016	2019	84	8
12	Mohamed Mezghrani	(Algeria)	CB	2 June 1994 (aged 24)	(Netherlands) RKC Waalwijk	2018	2021	2	0
6	Farouk Chafaï	(Algeria)	CB	23 June 1990 (aged 28)	(Algeria) Reserve team	2010	2019	257	24
3	Abderrahim Hamra	(Algeria)	CB	21 July 1997 (aged 21)	(Algeria) Reserve team	2016	2021	8	0
4	Mexes Nyeck Bayiha	(Cameroon)	CB	14 February 1996 (aged 22)	(Republic of the Congo) AS Otôho	2018	2020	2	0
25	Mokhtar Benmoussa	(Algeria)	LB / LM / LW	1 August 1986 (aged 32)	(Algeria) ES Sétif	2012	2019	232	16
22	Mohamed Rabie Meftah (VC)	(Algeria)	RB	5 May 1985 (aged 33)	(Algeria) JSM Béjaïa	2011	2020	232	41
21	Mehdi Benchikhoune	(Algeria)	RB	3 April 1996 (aged 22)	(Algeria) Reserve team	2017	2022	7	0
19	Redouane Cherifi	(Algeria)	LB	22 February 1993 (aged 25)	(Algeria) USM Bel-Abbès	2017	2021	60	2
Midfielders
8	Oualid Ardji	(Algeria)	LW / LB	7 September 1995 (aged 23)	(Algeria) NA Hussein Dey	2016	2021	42	3
20	Rafik Bouderbal	(Algeria)	AM / FW	19 September 1987 (aged 31)	(France) AS Lyon-Duchère	2016	2018	54	2
18	Amir Sayoud	(Algeria)	AM	30 September 1990 (aged 28)	(Algeria) DRB Tadjenanet	2016	2020	57	6
23	Hamza Koudri	(Algeria)	DM	15 December 1987 (aged 31)	(Algeria) MC Alger	2012	2020	215	7
8	Kamel Belarbi	(Algeria)	DM	11 April 1997 (aged 21)	(Algeria) USM El Harrach	2018	2022	10	0
10	Muaid Ellafi	(Libya)	AM / LW	7 March 1996 (aged 22)	(Saudi Arabia) Al-Shabab	2018	2021	15	5
24	Mohammed Benkhemassa	(Algeria)	AM / DM	28 June 1993 (aged 25)	(Algeria) Reserve team	2011	2018	134	4
27	Raouf Benguit	(Algeria)	CB / DM	5 April 1996 (aged 22)	(Algeria) Paradou AC	2016	2019	102	7
7	Faouzi Yaya	(Algeria)	MF	21 September 1989 (aged 29)	(Algeria) MO Béjaïa	2017	2020	47	7
2	Oussama Chita	(Algeria)	DM	31 October 1996 (aged 22)	(Algeria) MC Alger	2017	2021	54	2
Forwards
11	Abderrahmane Meziane	(Algeria)	ST	7 March 1994 (aged 24)	(Algeria) RC Arbaâ	2014	2021	110	21
17	Mohamed Amine Hamia	(Algeria)	FW	5 October 1989 (aged 29)	(Algeria) CR Belouizdad	2018	2021	22	6
13	Prince Ibara	(Republic of the Congo)	FW	7 February 1996 (aged 22)	(Qatar) Al-Wakrah	2018	2021	29	10
29	Aymen Mahious	(Algeria)	ST	15 September 1997 (aged 21)	(Algeria) CA Batna	2018	2021	16	2
14	Abdelkrim Zouari	(Algeria)	RW	14 July 1989 (aged 29)	(Algeria) USM Bel Abbès	2018	2021	14	4

== Transfers ==
=== In ===
Date	Pos	Player	From club	Transfer fee	Source
24 January 2018	DF	(Algeria) Ryad Kenniche	(Saudi Arabia) Al-Qadsiah	Free transfer (Released)	
23 March 2018	FW	(Algeria) Zakaria Benchaâ	Unattached	Free transfer	
31 May 2018	FW	(Algeria) Aymen Mahious	(Algeria) CA Batna	3,000,000 DA	
2 June 2018	DF	(Algeria) (Belgium) Mohamed Mezghrani	(Netherlands) RKC Waalwijk	Free transfer	
4 June 2018	DF	(Rwanda) Emery Bayisenge	(Morocco) JS Massira	Free transfer	
10 June 2018	FW	(Algeria) Mohamed Bentiba	(Algeria) MC Oran	Free transfer	
20 June 2018	FW	(Zimbabwe) Charlton Mashumba	(South Africa) Highlands Park	Free transfer	
23 June 2018	DF	(Algeria) Raouf Benguit	(Algeria) Paradou AC	Loan one year	
1 July 2018	AM	(Algeria) Ziri Hammar	(Algeria) JS Kabylie	Loan Return	
1 July 2018	DF	(Algeria) Abderrahim Hamra	(Algeria) DRB Tadjenanet	Loan Return	
1 July 2018	FW	(Algeria) Kaddour Cherif	(Algeria) DRB Tadjenanet	Loan Return	
1 July 2018	MF	(Algeria) Mustapha Bengrina	(Algeria) US Biskra	Loan Return	
1 July 2018	MF	(Algeria) Ibrahim Farhi	(Algeria) US Biskra	Loan Return	
6 July 2018	DF	(Algeria) Mohamed Amine Madani	(Algeria) JS Saoura	Undisclosed	
11 July 2018	FW	(Republic of the Congo) Prince Ibara	(Qatar) Al-Wakrah	Free transfer	
24 July 2018	DF	(Cameroon) Mexes Nyeck Bayiha	(Republic of the Congo) AS Otôho	Free transfer	
4 December 2018	MF	(Algeria) Kamel Belarbi	(Algeria) USM El Harrach	Undisclosed	
12 December 2018	DF	(Ivory Coast) (Qatar) Vivien Assie Koua	(Qatar) Al-Arabi	Undisclosed	
15 December 2018	MF	(Libya) Muaid Ellafi	(Saudi Arabia) Al-Shabab	Free transfer	
30 December 2018	FW	(Algeria) Abdelkrim Zouari	USM Bel Abbès	Free transfer	
15 January 2019	DF	(Algeria) Yanis Roumadi	(Romania) Farul Constanța	Free transfer	

=== Out ===
Date	Pos	Player	To club	Transfer fee	Source
3 January 2018 (Note: Ayoub Abdellaoui joined FC Sion after the end of his contract on 1 July 2018.)	LB / CB	(Algeria) Ayoub Abdellaoui	(Switzerland) FC Sion	Free transfer	
20 April 2018	DF	(Algeria) Ryad Kenniche	(Algeria) CR Belouizdad	Free transfer (Released)	
5 June 2018	AM / CM	(Algeria) Kaddour Beldjilali	(Algeria) CS Constantine	Free transfer (Released)	
6 June 2018 (Note: Oussama Darfalou joined Vitesse after the end of his contract on 1 July 2018.)	ST / FW	(Algeria) Oussama Darfalou	(Netherlands) Vitesse	Free transfer	
14 June 2018	DM	(Algeria) Reda Bellahcene	(Algeria) MO Béjaïa	Free transfer (Released)	
23 June 2018	MF	(Algeria) Ziri Hammar	(Algeria) MC Oran	Loan for one year	
29 June 2018	MF	(Algeria) Ilyes Yaiche	(Algeria) NA Hussein Dey	Loan	
1 July 2018	CF	(Algeria) Okacha Hamzaoui	(Portugal) Nacional	Loan Return	
1 July 2018	CB / DM	(Algeria) Raouf Benguit	(Algeria) Paradou AC	Loan Return	
1 July 2018	DF	(Algeria) Ibrahim Farhi	(Algeria) JS Saoura	Undisclosed	
6 July 2018	DF	(Algeria) Mohamed Amine Madani	(Algeria) MC El Eulma	Free transfer (Released)	
10 July 2018	FW	(Morocco) Reda Hajhouj	(Morocco) Olympique Khouribga	Free transfer (Released)	
14 July 2018	FW	(Zimbabwe) Charlton Mashumba	(South Africa) Jomo Cosmos	Free transfer (Released)	
14 July 2018	DF	(Rwanda) Emery Bayisenge	Unattached (Note: Emery Bayisenge joined Saif on 30 January 2019.)	Free transfer (Released)	
18 July 2018	FW	(Algeria) Mohamed Bentiba	(Algeria) ASM Oran	Free transfer (Released)	
12 December 2018	DF	(Cameroon) Mexes Nyeck Bayiha	(Oman) Sur SC (Note: Mexes joined Sur SC on 20 February 2019.)	Free transfer (Released)	
12 December 2018	MF	(Algeria) Ziri Hammar	JS Saoura	Free transfer (Released)	
12 December 2018	DF	(Algeria) (Belgium) Mohamed Mezghrani	(Hungary) Budapest Honvéd (Note: Mezghrani joined Budapest Honvéd on 22 January 2019.)	Free transfer (Released)	
26 December 2018	FW	(Algeria) Aymen Mahious	AS Ain M'lila	loan for six months	
26 December 2018	DF	(Algeria) Mehdi Benchikhoune	WA Tlemcen	loan for six months	
26 December 2018	DF	(Ivory Coast) (Qatar) Vivien Assie Koua	(Algeria) MC Oran	Free transfer	
2 January 2019	MF	(Algeria) Amir Sayoud	(Algeria) CR Belouizdad	150,000,000 DA	
9 January 2019	MF	(Algeria) Faouzi Yaya	Unattached (Note: Yaya joined NA Hussein Dey on 14 January 2019.)	Free transfer (Released)	

=== New contracts ===
No.	Pos	Player	Contract length	Contract end	Date	Source
16	GK	(Algeria) Ismaïl Mansouri	2 years	2020	6 June 2018	

== Pre-season and friendlies ==
27 June 2018 Friendly	Espérance de Tunis (Tunisia)	2–0	(Algeria) USM Alger	Mutuelleville
19:00 UTC+1	Belaïli 71', 85'	Report; Live TV: None		Stadium: Stade Chedli Zouiten; Referee: Wassim Ben Salah (Tunisia)
Note: Lineup for USM Alger - Zemmamouche (Mansouri 46’), Meftah (Benchikhoune 65’), Benyahia (Bayisenge 46’), Hamra (Nyeck 46’), Benmoussa (Cherifi 65’), Benkhemassa(Sayoud 65’), Chita (Koudri 46’), Benguit, Meziane (Mashumba 65’), Bouderbal (Ardji 65'), Yaya (Ntouba 46’)

2 July 2018 Friendly	Étoile Sportive du Sahel (Tunisia)	1–0	(Algeria) USM Alger	Sousse
18:30 UTC+1	? 46'	[ Report] Live TV: None		Stadium: Stade Olympique de Sousse
Note: Lineup for USM Alger - Zemmamouche (Mansouri 59’), Benyahia (Madani 63’), Chafaï (Bayisenge 63’), Meftah (Mezghrani 59’), Benmoussa (Cherifi 59’), Benkhemassa (Mashumba 61’), Koudri, Chita (Sayoud 61’), Yaya (Ardji 56’), Bouderbal (Meziane 54’), Mahious (Hamia 70’).

11 July 2018 Friendly	Sofapaka (Kenya)	1–0	(Algeria) USM Alger	Nairobi
16:00 UTC+3		Report; Live TV: None		Stadium: Camp Toyoyo
Note: Lineup for USM Alger; First half - Zemmamouche - Benchikhoune - Chafai - Benyahia - Benmoussa - Chita - Koudri - Benkhemassa - Sayoud - Meziane - Mahious; Second half - Sifour- Mezghrani - Mexes - Hamra - Cherifi - Benguit - Benhamouda - Bouderbal - Ardji - Hamia - Benchaa.

== Competitions ==
=== Overview ===
Competition	Record								Started round	Final position / round	First match	Last match
Competition	G	W	D	L	GF	GA	GD	Win %	Started round	Final position / round	First match	Last match
Ligue 1	30	15	8	7	49	29	+20	50.00	—N/a	Winners	14 August 2018	26 May 2019
Algerian Cup	3	2	0	1	5	4	+1	66.67	Round of 64	Round of 16	18 December 2018	22 January 2019
Confederation Cup	6	2	1	3	6	7	−1	33.33	Group stage	Quarter-final	18 July 2018	23 September 2018
Club Championship	4	3	0	1	6	4	+2	75.00	First round	Second round	8 August 2018	10 December 2018
Total	43	22	9	12	66	44	+22	51.16				

Updated to match played 22 January 2019
Source: Competitions

=== Ligue 1 ===
==== League table ====
Pos	Team	Pld	W	D	L	GF	GA	GD	Pts	Qualification or relegation
1	USM Alger (C)	30	15	8	7	49	29	+20	53	Qualification for Champions League
2	JS Kabylie	30	15	7	8	38	25	+13	52	Qualification for Champions League
3	Paradou AC	30	14	6	10	38	24	+14	48	Qualification for Confederation Cup
4	JS Saoura	30	13	8	9	33	22	+11	47	Qualification for Arab Club Champions Cup
5	ES Sétif	30	13	6	11	34	24	+10	45	

Source: DZFoot
Rules for classification: 1) points; 2) head-to-head points; 3) head-to-head goal difference; 4) goal difference; 5) total goals; 6) fairplay ranking; 7) playoff.
(C) Champions

==== Results summary ====
Overall								Home						Away					
Pld	W	D	L	GF	GA	GD	Pts	W	D	L	GF	GA	GD	W	D	L	GF	GA	GD
30	15	8	7	49	29	+20	53	10	2	3	31	13	+18	5	6	4	18	16	+2

Last updated: 26 May 2019.
Source: Competitive matches

==== Results by round ====
Round	1	2	3	4	5	6	7	8	9	10	11	12	13	14	15	16	17	18	19	20	21	22	23	24	25	26	27	28	29	30
Ground	A	H	A	H	A	H	A	H	A	H	A	H	A	H	A	H	A	H	A	H	A	H	A	H	A	H	A	H	A	H
Result	W	W	W	L	W	D	W	W	D	W	L	W	W	D	W	L	W	D	W	D	W	D	L	L	L	D	W	L	D	W
Position	4	2	1	1	1	2	2	1	1	1	2	1	1	1	1	1	1	1	1	1	1	1	1	1	1	1	1	1	1	1

Updated to match(es) played on 26 May 2019. Source: Competitive matches
A = Away; H = Home; W = Win; D = Draw; L = Loss

==== Matches ====
Win Draw Loss

14 August 2018 Round 1	USM Alger	3–1	DRB Tadjenanet	Bologhine
21:00	Chafaï (yellow card) 9'; Meziane 48'; Ibara 71'; Benchaâ 83'	Soccerway report Live TV: Algérie 3 / Canal Algérie	Demane 9' (yellow card) 11'; Aib (yellow card) 62'; Ounnas (yellow card) 66'; Fourloul (yellow card) 86'	Stadium: Omar Hamadi Stadium; Referee: Merzoug Brahimi

25 August 2018 Round 2	NA Hussein Dey	0–1	USM Alger	Belouizdad
17:00	Brahimi (yellow card) 19'	Soccerway report Live TV: Algérie 3	Benyahia (yellow card) 29'; Bouderbal (yellow card) 31'; Ibara 44'; Benkhemassa (yellow card) 72'	Stadium: Stade 20 Août 1955; Referee: Mehdi Abid Charef

1 September 2018 Round 4	JS Saoura	3–0	USM Alger	Béchar
20:00	Zaidi 25', 45+2'; Konaté 45'; Aouedj (yellow card) 62'	Soccerway report Live TV: TV Tamazight 4	(yellow card) 33' Hamra	Stadium: Stade 20 Août 1955; Referee: Ahmed Bouzrar

4 September 2018 Round 3	USM Alger	3–1	CA Bordj Bou Arreridj	Bologhine
20:45	Bouderbal 8'; Meftah 33'; Ibara (yellow card) 32' (goal) 52'; Benguit (yellow card) 40'	Soccerway report Live TV: Canal Algérie	Meftahi 9'; El Moudene (yellow card) 61'	Stadium: Omar Hamadi Stadium; Referee: Nabil Boukhalfa

20 September 2018 Round 7	USM Alger	3–0	AS Ain M'lila	Bologhine
19:00	Benmoussa 12' (pen.); Benguit 41'; Mahious 45'; Chita (yellow card) 69'	Soccerway report Live TV: None	(yellow card) 47' Dif	Stadium: Omar Hamadi Stadium; Referee: Redouane Necib

29 September 2018 Round 8	Paradou AC	1–3	USM Alger	Bologhine
17:45	Bouabta (yellow card) 41'; Meziani 48'	Soccerway report Live TV: None	Ardji (yellow card) 9'; Ibara 19'; Cherifi 58'; Benguit 59'	Stadium: Omar Hamadi Stadium; Referee: Mustapha Ghorbal

6 October 2018 Round 9	USM Alger	0–0	MC Alger	Algiers
17:45	Koudri (yellow card) 65'	Soccerway report Live TV: Algérie 3 / TV Tamazight 4 / Al-Kass Sports	Arous (yellow card) 42'; Demmou (yellow card) 52'; Amada (red card) 74'; Tebbi (yellow card) 90+2'	Stadium: July 5, 1962 Stadium; Referee: Mehdi Abid Charef

10 October 2018 Round 10	CR Belouizdad	0–1	USM Alger	Belouizdad
16:00	Herida (yellow card) 55'; Keddad (yellow card) 56'; Djerrar (yellow card) 77'; Selmi (yellow card) 79'	Soccerway report Live TV: Canal Algérie	Benguit (yellow card) 11'; Yaya 37'; Koudri (yellow card) 81'; Meziane (yellow card) 56'	Stadium: Stade 20 Août 1955; Referee: Mohamed Saïdi

15 October 2018 Round 5	USM Alger	5–1	MO Béjaïa	Bologhine
17:45	Meziane 19', 56'; Koudri 46'; Yaya 52' (pen.) (yellow card) 58'; Zemmamouche (yellow card) 67'; Benguit 89'	Soccerway report Live TV: TV Tamazight 4	Dahar 67' (pen.)	Stadium: Omar Hamadi Stadium; Referee: Abderrezzak Arab

19 October 2018 Round 6	USM Bel-Abbès	2–2	USM Alger	Sidi Bel Abbès
17:45	Mesmoudi (yellow card) 29'; Bouda 75'; Benayad 77'	Soccerway report Live TV: None	Chita 42'; Ibara 70'; Meziane (yellow card) 83'	Stadium: Stade 24 Fevrier 1956; Referee: Ahmed Bouzrar

30 October 2018 Round 12	Olympique de Médéa	1–3	USM Alger	Médéa
15:00	Motrani 68'	Soccerway report Live TV: None	Hamia 15', 90+3'; Yaya (yellow card) 45+2'; Meftah (yellow card) 65'; Ibara 78'	Stadium: Stade Imam Lyes de Médéa; Referee: Rafik Achouri

9 November 2018 Round 13	USM Alger	1–0	JS Kabylie	Bologhine
17:45	Zemmamouche (yellow card) 36'; Yaya 49'; Cherifi (yellow card) 64'; Benkhemassa (yellow card) 74'; Meziane (yellow card) 90+1'	Soccerway report Live TV: TV Tamazight 4		Stadium: Omar Hamadi Stadium; Referee: Mustapha Ghorbal

12 November 2018 Round 14	MC Oran	0–0	USM Alger	Oran
17:00	Yettou (yellow card) 37'; Bouchar (yellow card) 61'; Sebbah (yellow card) 83'	Soccerway report Live TV: TV Tamazight 4	Ardji (yellow card) 45'; Mansouri (yellow card) 90+2'; Sayoud (yellow card) 90+3'	Stadium: Ahmed Zabana Stadium; Referee: Abderrezzak Arab

15 November 2018 Round 15	USM Alger	2–1	CS Constantine	Bologhine
17:45	Benyahia 69' (yellow card) 70'; Hamia 83' (yellow card) 84'	Soccerway report Live TV: EPTV Terrestre / TV Tamazight 4	Belkacemi 39'	Stadium: Omar Hamadi Stadium; Referee: Farouk Mial

29 November 2018 Round 11	USM Alger	0–1	ES Sétif	Bologhine
17:45	Benmoussa (yellow card) 19'; Bouderbal (yellow card) 36'; Cherifi (yellow card) 58'; Benkhemassa (red card) 78'	Soccerway report Live TV: EPTV Terrestre / TV Tamazight 4	Bedrane 15' (yellow card) 58'; Ferhani (yellow card) 56'; Nemdil (red card) 78'	Stadium: Omar Hamadi Stadium; Referee: Mustapha Bessiri

4 January 2019 Round 16	DRB Tadjenanet	1–0	USM Alger	Tadjenanet
18:00	Aib 24'; Aggar (yellow card) 40'; Bensaha (yellow card) 56'; Demane (yellow card) 70'; Maroci (yellow card) 82'	Soccerway report Live TV: None		Stadium: Lahoua Smaïl Stadium; Referee: Nabil Boukhalfa

15 January 2019 Round 17	USM Alger	4–1	NA Hussein Dey	Bologhine
17:45	Benkhemassa (yellow card) 11'; Ibara 34' (pen.); Cherifi (yellow card) 48'; Meziane (yellow card) 50'; Zouari 52'; Koudri 55'; Ellafi 70'	Soccerway report Live TV: Canal Algérie	Dib 51'; Harrag (yellow card) 78'	Stadium: Omar Hamadi Stadium; Referee: Lahlou Benbraham

18 January 2019 Round 18	CA Bordj Bou Arreridj	1–1	USM Alger	Magra (Note: CA Bordj Bou Arreridj played their home match against USM Alger at Boucheligue Brothers Stadium, Magra, instead of their regular stadium Stade 20 Août 1955, Bordj Bou Arréridj.)
15:00	Ziad 4'	Soccerway report Live TV: None	Ellafi 75'	Stadium: Boucheligue Brothers Stadium; Attendance: 0 (close doors); Referee: Mohamed Saïdi

26 January 2019 Round 19	USM Alger	2–0	JS Saoura	Bologhine
16:00	Chafaï (yellow card) 21' (goal) 32'; Zouari 42'; Ibara (yellow card) 75' (red card) 76'; Ardji (yellow card) 90+3'	Soccerway report Live TV: None	Boulaouidet (red card) 90+3'	Stadium: Omar Hamadi Stadium; Attendance: 0 (close doors); Referee: Mustapha Ghorbal

5 February 2019 Round 20	MO Béjaïa	0–0	USM Alger	Béjaïa
17:00	Ouali (yellow card) 17'; Herida (yellow card) 90+2'	Soccerway report Live TV: None	Ardji (yellow card) 40'; Koudri (yellow card) 61'	Stadium: Stade de l'Unité Maghrébine; Referee: Mehdi Abid Charef

9 February 2019 Round 21	USM Alger	1–0	USM Bel Abbès	Bologhine
18:00	Meziane 23'; Benguit (yellow card) 35'; Chita (yellow card) 59'; Benkhemassa (yellow card) 64'	Soccerway report Live TV: None	Guebli (yellow card) 81'; Zerrouki (yellow card) 82'	Stadium: Omar Hamadi Stadium; Referee: Farid Bahloul

13 February 2019 Round 22	AS Ain M'lila	0–0	USM Alger	Aïn M'lila
15:00		Soccerway report Live TV: None		Stadium: Touhami Zoubir Khelifi Stadium; Referee: Farouk Mial

2 March 2019 Round 23	USM Alger	1–2	Paradou AC	Bologhine
17:00	Ibara 12'; Benkhemassa (yellow card) 90'	Soccerway report Live TV: Canal Algérie	Boudaoui (yellow card) 39'; Naidji 48' (yellow card) 49'; Zorgane (yellow card) 56'; Tahri 68'; Bouchina (yellow card) 82'	Stadium: Omar Hamadi Stadium; Referee: Mustapha Ghorbal

14 March 2019 Round 24	MC Alger	3–2	USM Alger	Algiers
17:00	Benaldjia 41'; Bendebka 56'; Lamara 89' (pen.)	Soccerway report Live TV: Canal Algérie / Al-Kass Sports	Zouari 52'; Benyahia 85'	Stadium: July 5, 1962 Stadium; Referee: Mehdi Abid Charef

3 April 2019 Round 25	USM Alger	2–3	CR Belouizdad	Bologhine
18:00	Hamia (yellow card) 10'; Benguit (yellow card) 20'; Meftah (yellow card) 28'; Zouari 31'; Ardji (yellow card) 38'; Meziane 59'	Soccerway report Live TV: Canal Algérie	Bechou 17', 40' (yellow card) 65'; Sayoud 29' (pen.); Bouchar (yellow card) 37'; Bousseliou (yellow card) 90+2'	Stadium: Omar Hamadi Stadium; Referee: Farouk Mial

21 April 2019 Round 26	ES Sétif	1–1	USM Alger	Sétif
16:00	Radouani 74'	Soccerway report Live TV: Canal Algérie	Ellafi 42' (yellow card) 43'	Stadium: Stade 8 Mai 1945; Referee: Mohamed Saïdi

11 May 2019 Round 27	USM Alger	3–1	Olympique de Médéa	Bologhine
22:30	Benguit 51' (yellow card) 69'; Ellafi 80' (yellow card) 80'; Meziane 90+1'	Soccerway report Live TV: Algérie 3 / Al-Kass Sports	Addadi 5' (yellow card) 6'	Stadium: Omar Hamadi Stadium; Referee: Missoum Benabdellah

16 May 2019 Round 28	JS Kabylie	2–1	USM Alger	Tizi Ouzou
22:30	Belgherbi 5'; Chetti (yellow card) 45+1'; Salhi (yellow card) 65'; Hamroune 68'	Soccerway report Live TV: TV Tamazight 4 / Al-Kass Sports	Cherifi (yellow card) 2'; Ellafi 28'; Benhammouda (yellow card) 42'; Koudri (yellow card) 79'	Stadium: November 1, 1954 Stadium; Referee: Lahlou Benbraham

21 May 2019 Round 29	USM Alger	1–1	MC Oran	Bologhine
22:30	Benkhemassa (yellow card) 33'; Benmoussa 43' (pen.)	Soccerway report Live TV: Canal Algérie / Al-Kass Sports	Halaïmia (yellow card) 25'; Sebbah (yellow card) 33'; Assie 58'; Nadji (yellow card) 62'; Mekkaoui (yellow card) 81'; Litim (yellow card) 87'; Aouadj (yellow card) 89'	Stadium: Omar Hamadi Stadium; Referee: Said Aouina

26 May 2019 Round 30	CS Constantine	1–3	USM Alger	Constantine
22:30	Belkacemi 34'	Soccerway report Live TV: Canal Algérie / Al-Kass Sports	Meziane 32'; Ibara 39' (yellow card) 40'; Meftah 85' (yellow card) 86'	Stadium: Stade Mohamed Hamlaoui; Referee: Mohamed Saïdi

=== Algerian Cup ===
18 December 2018 Round of 64	USM Alger	2–0	ASM Oran	Bologhine
18:00	Benyahia 25'; Ardji (yellow card) 65'; Benguit 88'; Cherifi (yellow card) 90'	Live TV: None	Boutiche (yellow card) 30'; Baghdaoui (yellow card) 58'	Stadium: Omar Hamadi Stadium; Referee: Abderrezzak Arab
Note: Lineup for USM Alger - Berrefane - Cherifi, Benyahia, Meftah, Ardji - Chita, Koudri, Benguit - Yaya (Hamia 71’), Bouderbal (Benhamouda 65’), Meziane

31 December 2018 Round of 32	USM Alger	2–1 (a.e.t.)	USM Bel Abbès	Bologhine
17:09	Ardji 45'; Bouderbal (red card) 65'; Koudri (yellow card) 69'; Hamia 107'; Belarbi (yellow card) 109'	Live TV: EPTV Terrestre	Benayad 49'; Bounoua (red card) 65'; Khedairia (yellow card) 90+5'; Zerrouki (yellow card) 99'	Stadium: Omar Hamadi Stadium; Referee: Rafik Achouri
Note: Lineup for USM Alger - Berrefane - Cherifi, Benyahia, Meftah (Benmoussa 56’), Ardji (Belarbi 103’) - Chita, Koudri, Benguit (Hamra 120’) - Ibara, Bouderbal, Meziane (Hamia 91’)

22 January 2018 Round of 16	ES Sétif	3–1	USM Alger	Sétif
17:00	Bedrane (yellow card) 2' (goal) 3'; Ferhani (yellow card) 42' (goal) 51'; Djabou 79'; Zeghba (yellow card) 89'	Live TV: EPTV Terrestre	Koudri (yellow card) 38'; Cherifi 48' (pen.)	Stadium: Stade 8 Mai 1945; Referee: Redouane Necib
Note: Lineup for USM Alger - Zemmamouche - Cherifi, Chafaï, Chita, Ardji (Bouderbal 74’) - Benkhemassa, Koudri, Benguit - Zouari (Benhamouda 85’), Hamia (Ellafi 52’), Meziane

=== Confederation Cup ===
==== Group stage ====
Pos	Team	Pld	W	D	L	GF	GA	GD	Pts	Qualification	USM	RAY	GOR	YAN
1	(Algeria) USM Alger	6	3	2	1	10	5	+5	11	Quarter-finals	—	1–1	2–1	4–0
2	(Rwanda) Rayon Sports	6	2	3	1	6	5	+1	9	Quarter-finals	1–2	—	1–1	1–0
3	(Kenya) Gor Mahia	6	2	2	2	10	7	+3	8		0–0	1–2	—	4–0
4	(Tanzania) Young Africans	6	1	1	4	4	13	−9	4		2–1	0–0	2–3	—

Source: CAF

18 July 2018 Matchday 3	Rayon Sports (Rwanda)	1–2	(Algeria) USM Alger	Kigali
18:00 UTC+2	Ange (yellow card) 19'; Diarra 38'; Muhire (yellow card) 65'	Report	45+2' Chafaï; (yellow card) 71' Chita; 90+3' Benguit	Stadium: Stade Régional Nyamirambo; Referee: Sidi Alioum (Cameroon)

29 July 2018 Matchday 4	USM Alger (Algeria)	1–1	(Rwanda) Rayon Sports	Blida (Note: USM Alger played their home match against Rayon Sports at Mustapha Tchaker Stadium, Blida, instead of their regular stadium July 5, 1962 Stadium, Algiers, as it was used for athletics at the 2018 African Youth Games.)
20:00 UTC+1	Chita (yellow card) 29'; Hamia 86'	Report	Diarra 28'	Stadium: Mustapha Tchaker Stadium; Referee: Juste Ephrem Zio (Burkina Faso)

19 August 2018 Matchday 5	Young Africans (Tanzania)	2–1	(Algeria) USM Alger	Dar es Salaam
19:00 UTC+3	Kaseke 44'; Makambo 47'; Mahadhi (yellow card) 67'	Report	52' Meziane; (yellow card) 82' Koudri	Stadium: National Stadium; Referee: Jackson Pavaza (Namibia)

29 August 2018 Matchday 6	USM Alger (Algeria)	2–1	(Kenya) Gor Mahia	Algiers
14:00 UTC+1	Ibara 36'; Sayoud 81'; Benmoussa (yellow card) 90+3'	Report	(yellow card) 27' Wendo; (yellow card) 30' Mieno; (yellow card) 62' Shakava; 83' Tuyisenge	Stadium: July 5, 1962 Stadium; Referee: Bienvenu Sinko (Ivory Coast)

==== Knockout stage ====
===== Quarter-finals =====
16 September 2018 First leg	Al-Masry (Egypt)	1–0	(Algeria) USM Alger	Port Said
21:00 UTC+2	Wadi 54'; Shoukry (yellow card) 73'; Gomaa (yellow card) 81'	Report	(yellow card) 31' Meftah; (yellow card) 56' Benyahia	Stadium: Al-Masry Club Stadium; Referee: Maguette N'Diaye (Senegal)

23 September 2018 Second leg	USM Alger (Algeria)	0–1 (0–2 agg.)	(Egypt) Al-Masry	Sétif (Note: USM Alger played their home match against Al-Masry at Stade 8 Mai 1945, Sétif, instead of their regular stadium July 5, 1962 Stadium, Algiers, due to renovation.)
20:00 UTC+1	Benkhemassa (yellow card) 75'; Mahious (yellow card) 88'	Report	Wadi (yellow card) 6' (goal) 34'; Shawki (yellow card) 22'; Koffi (yellow card) 70'	Stadium: Stade 8 Mai 1945; Referee: Joshua Bondo (Botswana)

=== Club Championship Cup ===
==== First round ====
8 August 2018 First leg	Al-Quwa Al-Jawiya (Iraq)	0–1	(Algeria) USM Alger	Karbala
20:00 UTC+3		DZfoot report Live TV: Abu Dhabi Sports	72' Mahious	Stadium: Karbala International Stadium; Referee: Ali Shaban (Kuwait)
Note: Lineup for USM Alger - Zemmamouche, Benyahia, Chafaï, Cherifi, Meftah, Chita, Yaya, Koudri, Benkhemassa, Ardji (Mahious, 63’), Hamia (Benchaâ, 29’, Hamra, 80’)

9 September 2018 Second leg	USM Alger (Algeria)	3–0 (Note: USM Alger were awarded a 3–0 walkover win in the second leg after Al-Quwa Al-Jawiya's players withdrew from the match at 71 minutes while losing 2–0 in protest at offensive chants from spectators.) (3–0 agg.)	(Iraq) Al-Quwa Al-Jawiya	Bologhine
19:00 UTC+1	Meftah 39' (yellow card) 49'; Natiq 45' (o.g.); Benkhemassa (yellow card) 67'	DZfoot report Live TV: Abu Dhabi Sports		Stadium: Omar Hamadi Stadium; Referee: Mohammed Abdulla Hassan Mohamed (United Arab Emirates)
Note: Lineup for USM Alger - Zemmamouche, Benyahia, Chafaï, Cherifi, Meftah (Koudri, 50’), Chita, Benguit, Benkhemassa, Bouderbal, Meziane (Yaya, 64’), Ibara (Benchaâ, 55’)

==== Second round ====
20 November 2018 First leg	Al-Merrikh (Sudan)	4–1	(Algeria) USM Alger	Omdurman
19:30 UTC+2	Yousif 1', 9', 34'; Al-Nasaan 39'	DZfoot report Live TV: Abu Dhabi Sports	62' Hamia; (yellow card) 86' Benmoussa	Stadium: Al-Merrikh Stadium; Referee: Turki Al-Khudair (Saudi Arabia)
Note: Lineup for USM Alger - Zemmamouche, Cherifi (Benmoussa, 50’), Benyahia, Chafai, Meftah, Koudri, Benkhemassa, Benguit, Yaya (Mahious, 75’), Hamia, Ardji (Meziane, 64’)

10 December 2018 Second leg	USM Alger (Algeria)	2–0 (3–4 agg.)	(Sudan) Al-Merrikh	Algiers
19:00 UTC+1	Hamia (yellow card) 23'; Benyahia (yellow card) 23'; Chita 40'; Ardji 60'	DZfoot report Live TV: Abu Dhabi Sports		Stadium: Stade du 5 Juillet 1962; Referee: Sultan Al Marzooqi (United Arab Emirates)
Note: Lineup for USM Alger - Mansouri, Cherifi, Benyahia, Meftah, Ardji (Bouderbal, 85'), Chita (Benkhemassa, 57'), Koudri, Benguit, Yaya (Mahious, 77'), Hamia, Meziane

== Squad information ==
=== Appearances and goals ===
No.	Pos	Player	Nat	Ligue 1			Algerian Cup			Confederation Cup			Club Champions Cup			Total		
No.	Pos	Player	Nat	App	St	G	App	St	G	App	St	G	App	St	G	App	St	G
Goalkeepers
1	GK	Lamine Zemmamouche	(Algeria)	13	13	0	1	1	0	6	6	0	3	3	0	23	23	0
16	GK	Ismaïl Mansouri	(Algeria)	15	14	0	0	0	0	0	0	0	1	1	0	16	15	0
30	GK	Mourad Berrefane	(Algeria)	3	3	0	2	2	0	0	0	0	0	0	0	5	5	0
Defenders
5	CB	Mohamed Benyahia	(Algeria)	25	25	2	2	2	1	3	3	0	4	4	0	34	34	3
6	CB	Farouk Chafaï	(Algeria)	20	20	1	1	1	0	6	6	1	3	3	0	30	0	2
19	LB	Redouane Cherifi	(Algeria)	28	27	1	3	3	1	4	4	0	4	4	0	39	38	2
3	CB	Abderrahime Hamra	(Algeria)	3	3	0	1	0	0	3	3	0	1	0	0	8	6	0
22	RB	Mohamed Rabie Meftah	(Algeria)	14	13	2	2	2	0	6	6	0	4	4	1	26	25	3
25	LB / LW	Mokhtar Benmoussa	(Algeria)	19	12	2	1	0	0	3	2	0	1	0	0	24	14	2
~~12~~	CB	Mohamed Mezghrani (Note: Player transferred out during the season)	(Algeria)	2	2	0	0	0	0	0	0	0	0	0	0	2	2	0
~~4~~	CB	Mexes Nyeck Bayiha	(Cameroon)	1	0	0	0	0	0	1	1	0	0	0	0	2	1	0
~~21~~	RB	Mehdi Benchikhoune	(Algeria)	0	0	0	0	0	0	1	0	0	0	0	0	1	0	0
Midfielders
2	DM	Oussama Chita	(Algeria)	21	20	1	3	3	0	5	5	0	3	3	1	32	31	2
10	AM / LW	Muaid Ellafi	(Libya)	14	8	5	1	0	0	0	0	0	0	0	0	15	8	5
8	DM	Kamel Belarbi	(Algeria)	9	5	0	1	0	0	0	0	0	0	0	0	10	5	0
23	DM	Hamza Koudri	(Algeria)	20	16	2	3	3	0	4	4	0	4	3	0	31	26	2
24	AM / DM	Mohammed Benkhemassa	(Algeria)	22	21	0	1	1	0	3	3	0	4	3	0	30	28	0
27	CB / DM	Raouf Benguit	(Algeria)	28	26	4	3	3	1	6	5	1	3	3	0	40	37	6
20	AM	Rafik Bouderbal	(Algeria)	21	12	1	3	2	0	4	4	0	2	1	0	30	19	1
15	LW / LB	Oualid Ardji	(Algeria)	20	17	0	3	3	1	3	0	0	3	3	1	29	23	2
26	AM	Billel Benhammouda	(Algeria)	12	3	0	2	0	0	0	0	0	0	0	0	14	3	0
~~7~~	MF	Faouzi Yaya	(Algeria)	10	7	3	1	1	0	5	4	0	4	3	0	20	15	3
~~18~~	AM	Amir Sayoud	(Algeria)	8	4	0	0	0	0	4	0	1	0	0	0	12	4	1
Forwards
11	ST	Abderrahmane Meziane	(Algeria)	24	23	7	3	3	0	6	6	1	3	2	0	36	34	8
9	ST	Zakaria Benchaâ	(Algeria)	5	1	1	0	0	0	0	0	0	2	0	0	7	1	1
13	ST	Prince Ibara	(Republic of the Congo)	23	16	9	1	1	0	4	4	1	1	1	0	29	22	10
14	RW	Abdelkrim Zouari	(Algeria)	13	10	4	1	1	0	0	0	0	0	0	0	14	11	4
17	ST	Mohamed Amine Hamia	(Algeria)	10	6	3	3	1	1	1	0	1	3	3	1	17	10	6
~~29~~	ST	Aymen Mahious	(Algeria)	9	2	1	0	0	0	4	1	0	3	0	1	16	3	2
Total				30		49	3		5	6		6	4		6	43		66

Last updated: 17 June 2022
Source: soccerway.com

=== Disciplinary record ===
No.	Pos.	Player	Ligue 1			Algerian Cup			Confederation Cup			Club Championship			Total		
No.	Pos.	Player	Yellow card	(yellow card) (yellow-red card)	Red card	Yellow card	(yellow card) (yellow-red card)	Red card	Yellow card	(yellow card) (yellow-red card)	Red card	Yellow card	(yellow card) (yellow-red card)	Red card	Yellow card	(yellow card) (yellow-red card)	Red card
1	GK	(Algeria) Lamine Zemmamouche	2	0	0	0	0	0	0	0	0	0	0	0	2	0	0
16	GK	(Algeria) Ismaïl Mansouri	1	0	0	0	0	0	0	0	0	0	0	0	1	0	0
5	DF	(Algeria) Mohamed Benyahia	2	0	0	0	0	0	1	0	0	1	0	0	4	0	0
6	DF	(Algeria) Farouk Chafaï	2	0	0	0	0	0	0	0	0	0	0	0	2	0	0
19	DF	(Algeria) Redouane Cherifi	3	0	0	1	0	0	0	0	0	0	0	0	4	0	0
3	DF	(Algeria) Abderrahime Hamra	1	0	0	0	0	0	0	0	0	0	0	0	1	0	0
22	DF	(Algeria) Mohamed Rabie Meftah	3	0	0	0	0	0	1	0	0	1	0	0	5	0	0
25	DF	(Algeria) Mokhtar Benmoussa	1	0	0	0	0	0	1	0	0	1	0	0	3	0	0
2	MF	(Algeria) Oussama Chita	2	0	0	0	0	0	2	0	0	0	0	0	4	0	0
10	MF	(Libya) Muaid Ellafi	2	0	0	0	0	0	0	0	0	0	0	0	2	0	0
8	MF	(Algeria) Kamel Belarbi	0	0	0	1	0	0	0	0	0	0	0	0	1	0	0
23	MF	(Algeria) Hamza Koudri	5	0	0	2	0	0	1	0	0	0	0	0	8	0	0
24	MF	(Algeria) Mohammed Benkhemassa	5	0	1	0	0	0	1	0	0	1	0	0	7	0	1
27	MF	(Algeria) Raouf Benguit	5	0	0	0	0	0	0	0	0	0	0	0	5	0	0
20	MF	(Algeria) Rafik Bouderbal	2	0	0	0	0	1	0	0	0	0	0	0	2	0	1
15	MF	(Algeria) Oualid Ardji	5	0	0	1	0	0	0	0	0	0	0	0	6	0	0
26	MF	(Algeria) Billel Benhammouda	1	0	0	0	0	0	0	0	0	0	0	0	1	0	0
~~7~~	MF	(Algeria) Faouzi Yaya	2	0	0	0	0	0	0	0	0	0	0	0	2	0	0
~~18~~	MF	(Algeria) Amir Sayoud	1	0	0	0	0	0	0	0	0	0	0	0	1	0	0
11	FW	(Algeria) Abderrahmane Meziane	2	0	0	0	0	0	0	0	0	0	0	0	2	0	0
13	FW	(Republic of the Congo) Prince Ibara	3	0	1	0	0	0	0	0	0	0	0	0	3	0	1
17	FW	(Algeria) Mohamed Amine Hamia	2	0	0	0	0	0	0	0	0	1	0	0	3	0	0
Total			52	0	2	5	0	1	8	0	0	5	0	0	70	0	3

==== Suspensions ====
Date Incurred	Nation	Name	Games Missed	Reason
29 July 2018	(Algeria)	Oussama Chita	1	Yellow card
29 July 2018	(Algeria)	Mohammed Benkhemassa	3	Disciplinary reasons
29 July 2018	(Algeria)	Rafik Bouderbal	2	Disciplinary reasons
29 July 2018	(Algeria)	Mohamed Benyahia	2	Disciplinary reasons
29 July 2018	(Algeria)	Ismaïl Mansouri	2	Disciplinary reasons
9 November 2018	(Algeria)	Mohamed Lamine Zemmamouche	1	(yellow card) Disciplinary reasons
29 November 2018	(Algeria)	Mohammed Benkhemassa	2	(red card) (vs. ES Sétif)
31 December 2018	(Algeria)	Rafik Bouderbal	2	(red card) (vs. USM Bel Abbès)
22 January 2019	(Algeria)	Hamza Koudri	1	Yellow card
26 January 2019	(Republic of the Congo)	Prince Ibara	2	(red card) (vs. JS Saoura)
11 May 2019	(Algeria)	Raouf Benguit	1	Yellow card

=== Goalscorers ===
Includes all competitive matches. The list is sorted alphabetically by surname when total goals are equal.

No.	Nat.	Player	Pos.	L 1	AC	CC 3	ACC	TOTAL
13	(Republic of the Congo)	Prince Ibara	FW	9	0	1	0	10
11	(Algeria)	Abderrahmane Meziane	MF	7	0	1	0	8
17	(Algeria)	Mohamed Amine Hamia	FW	3	1	1	1	6
27	(Algeria)	Raouf Benguit	MF	4	1	1	0	6
10	(Libya)	Muaid Ellafi	MF	5	0	0	0	5
14	(Algeria)	Abdelkrim Zouari	MF	4	0	0	0	4
7	(Algeria)	Faouzi Yaya	MF	3	0	0	0	3
5	(Algeria)	Mohamed Benyahia	DF	2	1	0	0	3
22	(Algeria)	Mohamed Meftah	DF	2	0	0	1	3
23	(Algeria)	Hamza Koudri	MF	2	0	0	0	2
25	(Algeria)	Mokhtar Benmoussa	DF	2	0	0	0	2
6	(Algeria)	Farouk Chafaï	DF	1	0	1	0	2
19	(Algeria)	Redouane Cherifi	DF	1	1	0	0	2
29	(Algeria)	Aymen Mahious	FW	1	0	0	1	2
2	(Algeria)	Oussama Chita	MF	1	0	0	1	2
15	(Algeria)	Oualid Ardji	MF	0	1	0	1	2
9	(Algeria)	Zakaria Benchaâ	FW	1	0	0	0	1
20	(Algeria)	Rafik Bouderbal	MF	1	0	0	0	1
18	(Algeria)	Amir Sayoud	MF	0	0	1	0	1
Own Goals				0	0	0	1	1
Totals				49	5	6	6	66

==== Clean sheets ====
Includes all competitive matches.

No.	Nat	Name	L 1	AC	CL 3	CL 4	Total
1	(Algeria)	Lamine Zemmamouche	4	–	0	2	6
16	(Algeria)	Ismaïl Mansouri	5	–	–	1	6
30	(Algeria)	Mourad Berrefane	–	1	–	–	1
		TOTALS	9	1	0	3	13

== Kit ==
Supplier: Joma Sponsor: Djezzy

Home	Away	Third
