= List of USM Alger players (50–99 appearances) =

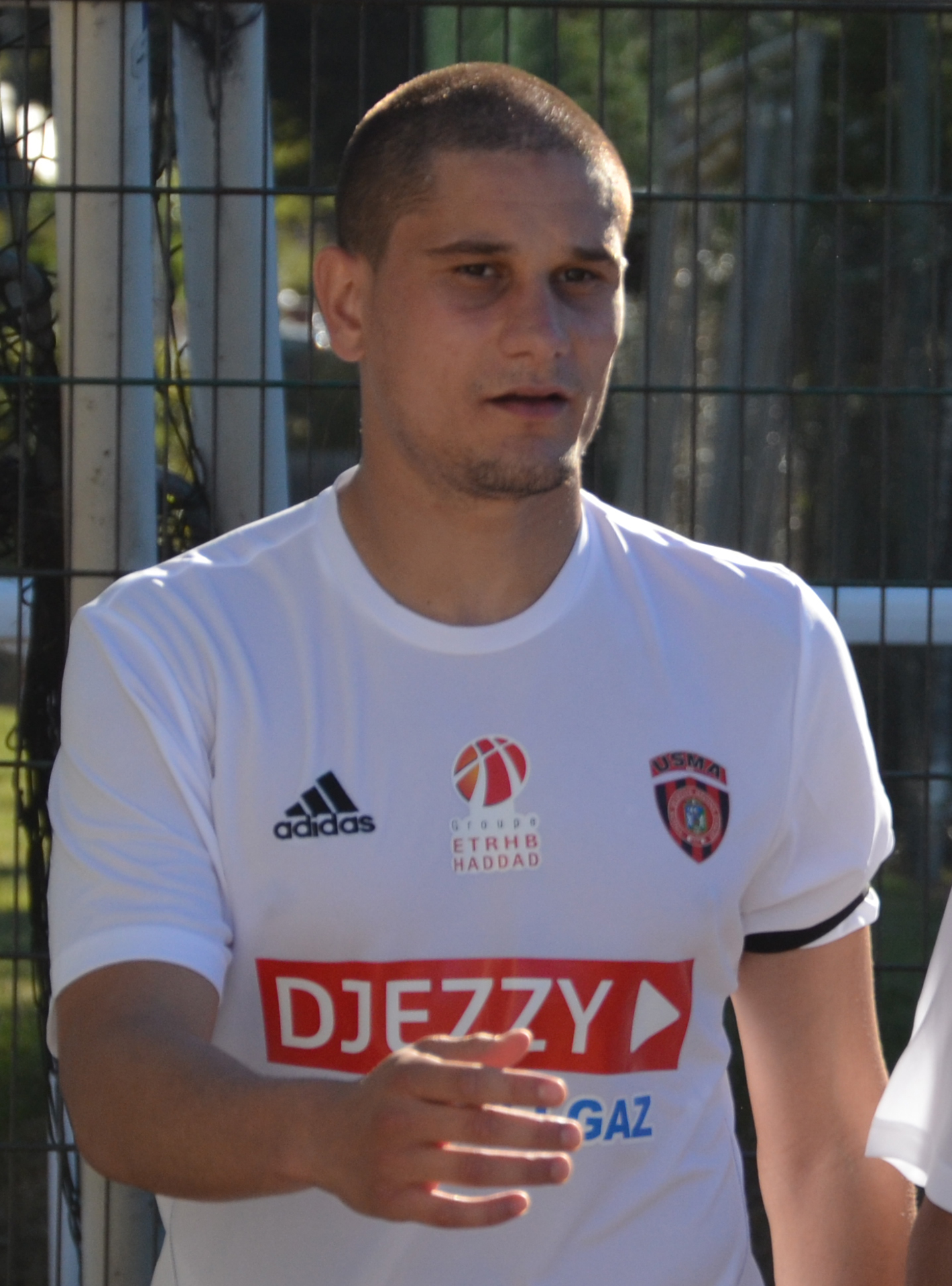
Mohamed Benyahia, played 84 games for USM Alger from 2016 to 2019.

Union sportive de la médina d'Alger is an Algerian professional football club based in Algiers, Algiers Province. The club was formed in Casbah in 1937 as Union Sportive Musulmane d'Alger, and played their first competitive match in 1937, when they entered the 1937–38 Ligue d'Alger Troisième Division. The club was renamed Union sportive de la médina d'Alger in 1989.

Each player's details include the duration of his USM Alger career, his typical playing position while with the club, and the number of games played and goals scored in all senior competitive matches.

Two players, Noureddine Daham and Moncef Ouichaoui, fell one short of 100 appearances for USM Alger. The list includes five players who are still contracted to the club, and so can add to their totals.

== Key ==
- The list is ordered first by date of debut, and then if necessary in alphabetical order.
- Statistics are correct up to and including the match played on June 4, 2026. Where a player left the club permanently after this date, his statistics are updated to his date of leaving.

Positions key
Pre-1960s		1960s–	
GK	Goalkeeper		
FB	Full back	DF	Defender
HB	Half back	MF	Midfielder
FW	Forward		

Nationality
Unless otherwise noted, the nationality of a player is determined by the country/countries which he has played for, or if said person has not played international football, their country of birth.
Position
Playing positions are listed according to the tactical formations that were employed at the time. Thus the change in the names of defensive and midfield positions reflects the tactical evolution that occurred from the 1960s onwards.
Club career
Club career is defined as the first and last calendar years in which the player appeared for the club in any of the competitions listed below.
Total appearances and Total goals
Total appearances and goals comprise those in the Algerian Ligue Professionnelle 1, Algerian Ligue 2, Algerian Cup, Algerian League Cup, Algerian Super Cup, Arab Club Champions Cup, CAF Champions League, CAF Confederation Cup, CAF Cup, CAF Super Cup and African Cup Winners' Cup.

== Players ==
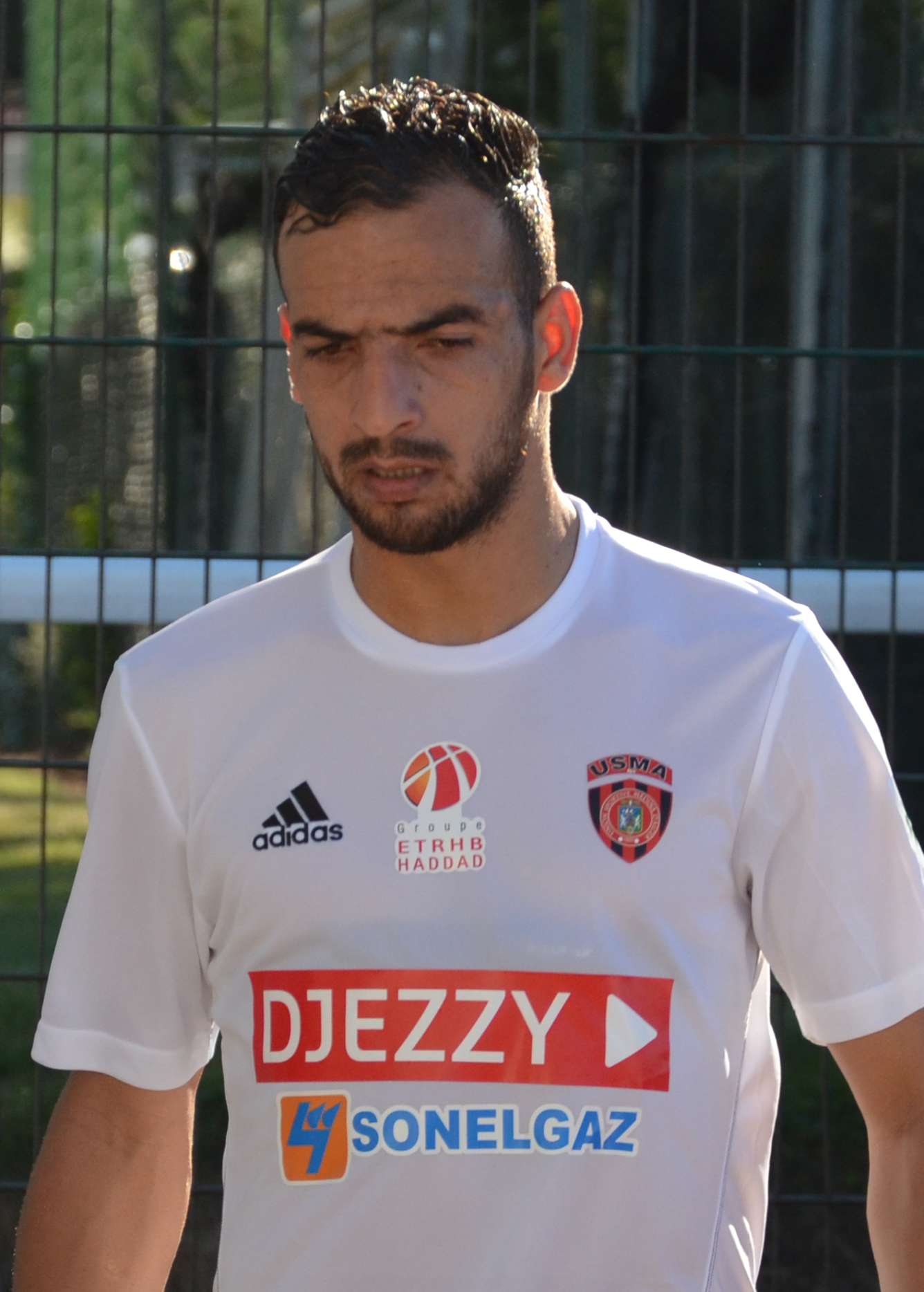
Kaddour Beldjilali played 82 games from 2015 to 2018.

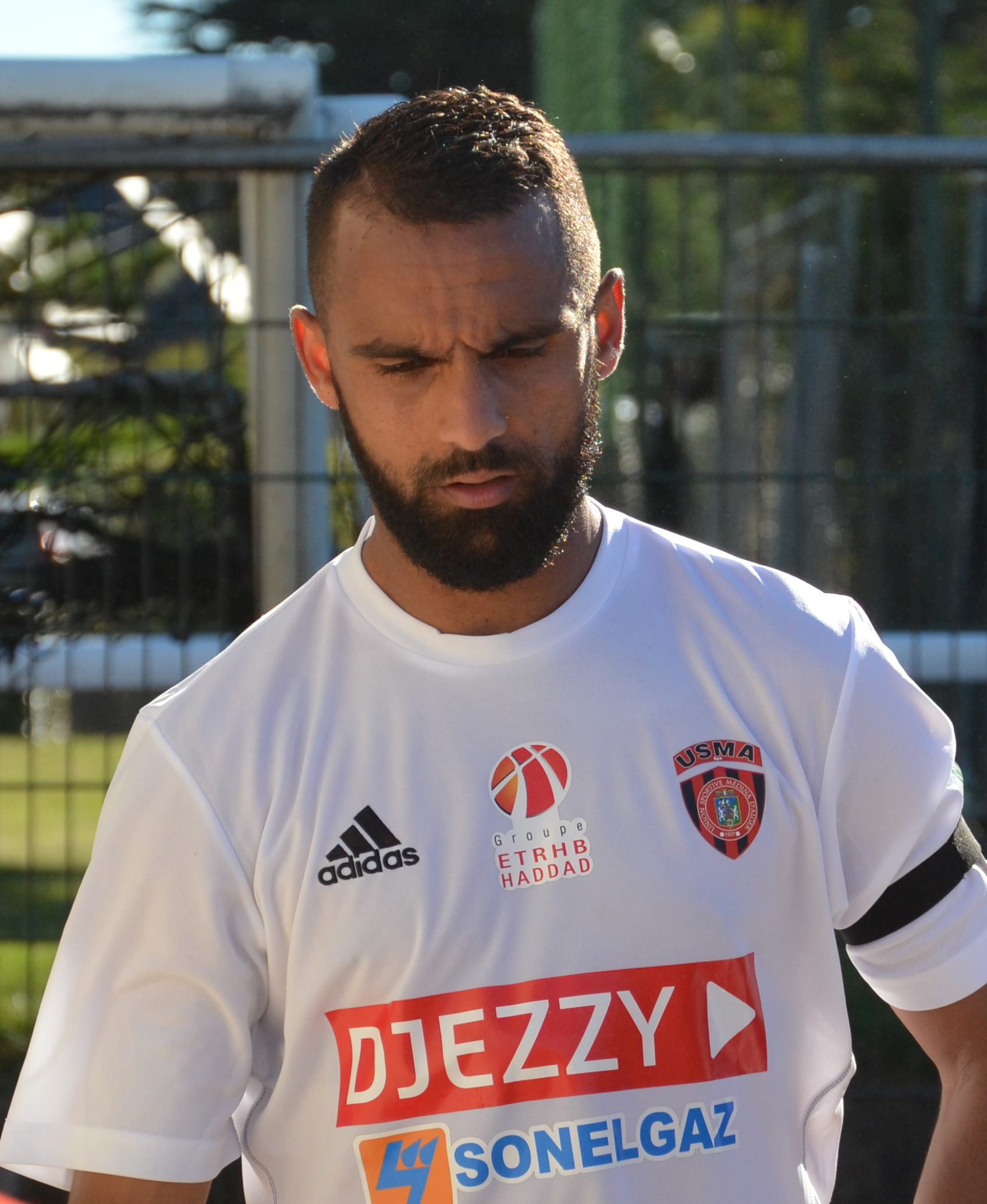
Rafik Bouderbal started 53 games for USM Alger, scoring two goals.

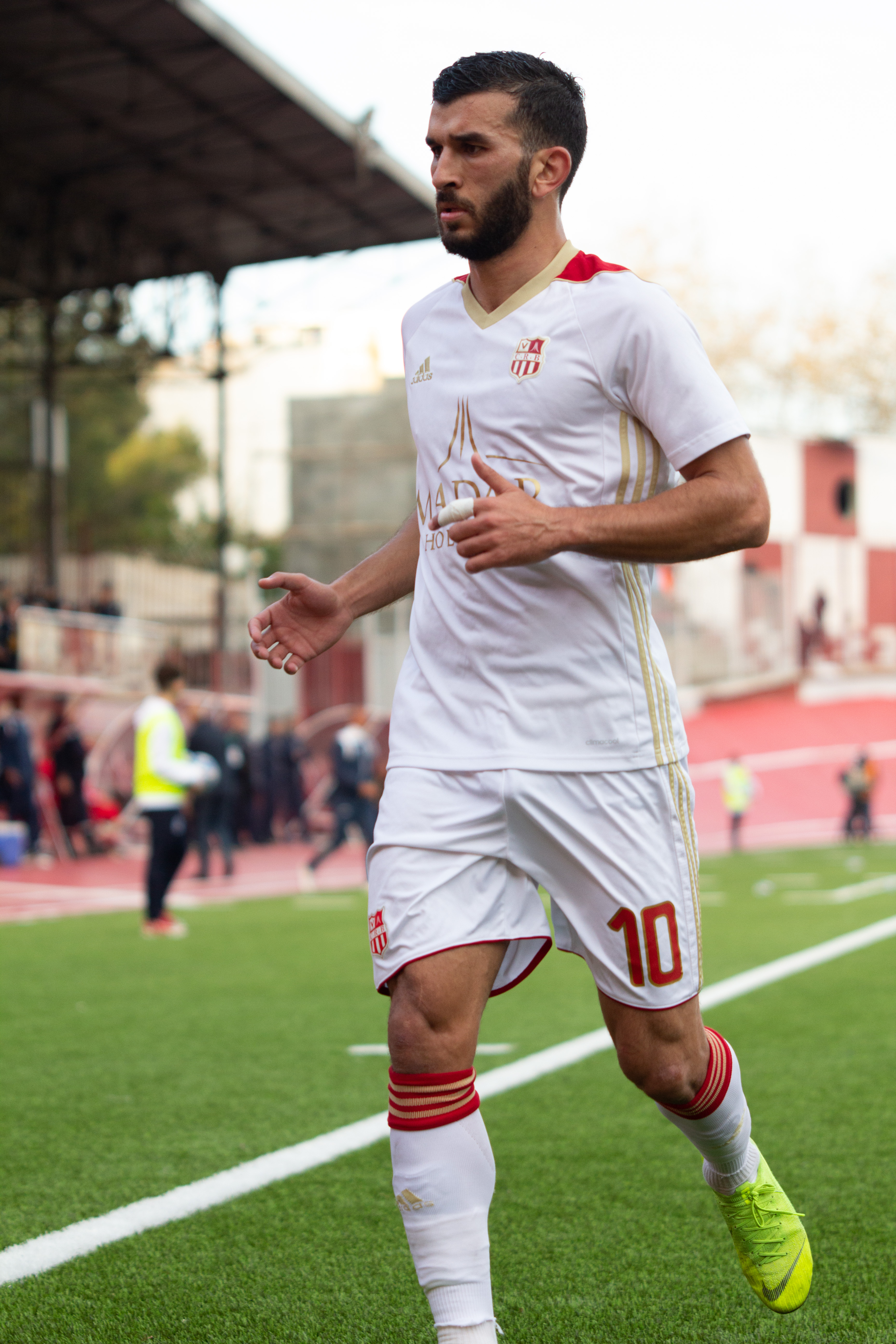
Amir Sayoud played 57 games from 2016 to 2018.

Bold Still playing competitive football in USM Alger. (Note: Since 2000–01 season statistics of all the games. Statistics correct as of game against MC Oran on June 6, 2026.)

List of USM Alger players between 50 and 99 appearances
Player	Nationality	Pos	Club career	Starts	Subs	Total	Goals	Ref.
Player	Nationality	Pos	Club career	Appearances			Goals	Ref.
Noureddine Daham	Algeria	FW	2009–2013	0	0	99	41	
Moncef Ouichaoui	Algeria	FW	2000–2001; 2002–2004	0	0	99	36	
Ayoub Abdellaoui	Algeria	DF	2013–2018	90	4	94	3	
Tarek Ghoul	Algeria	DF	1996–2005	0	0	93	14	
Mohamed Seguer	Algeria	FW	2012–2016	0	0	92	20	
Ali Rial	Algeria	DF	2007–2010	0	0	92	10	
Hocine Dehiri	Algeria	DF	2023–2026	71	17	88	2	
Glody Likonza	DR Congo	MF	2024–	61	24	85	6	
Lamouri Djediat	Algeria	MF	2011–2014	0	0	84	22	
Mohamed Benyahia	Algeria	DF	2016–2019	81	3	84	8	
Hocine El Orfi	Algeria	MF	2012–2016	60	24	84	0	
Abdelkader Besseghir	Algeria	DF	2004–2008	0	0	83	2	
Mohamed Boussefiane	Algeria	FW	2005–2009	0	0	82	12	
Moulay Haddou	Algeria	DF	2004–2007	0	0	81	16	
Abderrahim Hamra	Algeria	DF	2018–2022	66	14	80	4	
Redouane Cherifi	Algeria	DF	2017–2020	75	4	79	2	
Oussama Darfalou	Algeria	FW	2015–2018	64	15	79	40	
Abdelkader Laïfaoui	Algeria	DF	2011–2015	0	0	79	5	
Ismaïl Mansouri	Algeria	GK	2008–2020	77	2	79	0	
Oualid Ardji	Algeria	MF	2015–2020	54	23	77	8	
Khaled Bousseliou	Algeria	FW	2022–2026	33	43	76	7	
Daniel Moncharé	Cameroon	DF	2006–2009	0	0	75	1	
Houssam Ghacha	Algeria	FW	2024–	67	7	74	17	
Kaddour Beldjilali	Algeria	MF	2015–2018	53	19	72	6	
Nouri Ouznadji	Algeria	FW	2009–2012	34	37	71	13	
Mohamed Amine Zidane	Algeria	DF	2005–2007; 2008–2010	0	0	69	2	
Akram Djahnit	Algeria	MF	2022–2024	46	20	66	5	
Mohamed Ait El Hadj	Algeria	FW	2021–2025	20	44	64	4	
Kamel Maouche	Algeria	MF	2000–2002	52	12	64	2	
Ahmed Khaldi	Algeria	FW	2024–	54	8	62	16	
Saïd Sayah	Algeria	MF	2007–2011	0	0	62	2	
Mohamed Amine Aouamri	Algeria	DF	2009–2011	59	1	60	6	
Mehdi Benaldjia	Algeria	MF	2009–2014	34	23	57	4	
Amir Sayoud	Algeria	MF	2016–2018	26	31	57	5	
Salim Boukhanchouche	Algeria	MF	2024–2025	48	9	57	3	
Antar Boucherit	Algeria	MF	2006–2008	0	0	56	3	
Mouaouia Meklouche	Algeria	FW	2008–2013	0	0	56	9	
Ilyes Chetti	Algeria	DF	2024–	42	14	56	1	
Cheikh Hamidi	Algeria	FW	2009–2011	42	13	55	22	
Karim Baïteche	Algeria	FW	2012–2016	32	23	55	5	
Rafik Bouderbal	Algeria	MF	2016–2019	34	20	54	2	
Ahmed Gasmi	Algeria	FW	2012–2014	37	16	53	15	
Riad Benayad	Algeria	FW	2025–2026	31	22	53	5	
Hamza Aït Ouamar	Algeria	MF	2009–2011	47	3	50	0	
Nabil Lamara	Algeria	DF	2023–2025	37	13	50	1	
Rayane Mahrouz	Algeria	DF	2024–	34	16	50	4	
