= Prince Ibara =

Congolese footballer

Personal information
- Full name: Prince Vinny Ibara Doniama
- Date of birth: 7 February 1996 (age 30)
- Place of birth: Brazzaville, Congo
- Height: 1.88 m (6 ft 2 in)
- Position: Forward

Senior career*
Years	Team	Apps	(Gls)
2014	ACNFF		
2015	AS Pélican	6	(6)
2015–2017	CA Bizertin	19	(7)
2017–2018	Al-Wakrah	6	(1)
2018–2019	USM Alger	23	(9)
2019–2021	Beerschot	12	(0)
2020	→ Neftchi Baku (loan)	7	(1)
2021	→ Châteauroux (loan)	13	(3)
2021–2023	Bengaluru	17	(4)
2023–2024	Becamex Binh Duong	10	(1)
2024	Hong Linh Ha Tinh FC	15	(5)
2024–2025	USM Khenchela	7	(1)
2025–2026	Al-Nojoom		

International career^{‡}
2016–	Congo	15	(4)
- * Club domestic league appearances and goals as of 08:14, 25 May 2024 (UTC) ‡ National team caps and goals as of 13:54, 16 July 2021 (UTC)

Prince Vinny Ibara Doniama (born 7 February 1996) is a Congolese professional footballer who plays as a forward.

== Club career ==
Ibara began his career at Congolese side ACNFF in 2014. He later moved to AS Pélican of Gabon Championnat National D1 and CA Bizertin of Tunisia before joining Qatar Stars League side Al-Wakrah in 2017.

On 11 July 2018, Ibara joined USM Alger for three seasons, coming from Al-Wakrah To be an alternative to the striker Oussama Darfalou, also became the first Congolese to play in USM Alger. In the first, USMA signed with Zimbabwean Charlton Mashumba but the arrival of the new coach Thierry Froger, who decided to contract with another foreign player in his place. Ibara made his debut for USM Alger in the CAF Confederation Cup during a win against Rayon Sports, later on 14 August, he made his debut in the Ligue 1 against DRB Tadjenanet as a starter and scored his first goal with his new club in 3–1 victory. The following season, he scored nine goals helping the club clinching the 2018–19 Algerian Ligue Professionnelle 1 title.

In July 2019, he signed for Belgian First Division A club K Beerschot VA.

On 11 September 2020, Neftchi Baku announced the signing of Ibara on one-year long loan. The loan ended early and he moved on loan to French club LB Châteauroux in January 2021.

In July 2021, he moved to Indian Super League club Bengaluru FC, on a two-year deal ahead of the Blues' 2021 AFC Cup qualifying play-offs. He made his ISL debut on 20 November against NorthEast United FC in a 4–2 win, in which he scored a goal.

He moved to Becamex Binh Duong in September 2023. On 23 February 2023, he scored his first goal for the club, the only goal in the away match against The Cong-Viettel. He then played for Hong Linh Ha Tinh FC.

On 21 September 2025, Ibara joined Saudi Second Division League club Al-Nojoom.

== International career ==
He made his international debut for Congo in 2016, in a friendly match against Morocco. On 11 October in the 2019 Africa Cup of Nations qualifier, Ibara scored his first international goal in a 3–1 win against Liberia.

== Career statistics ==
=== Club ===
As of 30 August 2022

Appearances and goals by club, season and competition
Club	Season	League			Cup		Continental		Other		Total	
Club	Season	Division	Apps	Goals	Apps	Goals	Apps	Goals	Apps	Goals	Apps	Goals
CA Bizertin	2015–16	Tunisian Professionnelle 1	7	2	0	0	—		—		7	2
CA Bizertin	2016–17	Tunisian Professionnelle 1	12	6	0	0	—		—		12	6
CA Bizertin	Total		19	8	0	0	—		—		19	8
Al-Wakrah SC	2016–17	Qatar Stars League	8	1	0	0	—		—		8	1
Al-Wakrah SC	2017–18	Qatargas League	0	0	0	0	—		—		0	0
Al-Wakrah SC	Total		8	1	0	0	—		—		8	1
USM Alger	2018–19	Algerian Professionnelle 1	23	9	1	0	4 (Note: All appearance(s) in CAF Confederation Cup)	1	1 (Note: All appearance(s) in Arab Club Champions Cup)	0	29	10
Career total			50	18	1	0	4	1	1	0	56	19

=== International goals ===
Scores and results list Congo's goal tally first.

No.	Date	Venue	Opponent	Score	Result	Competition
1.	11 October 2018	Stade Alphonse Massemba-Débat, Brazzaville, Congo	Liberia	2–1	3–1	2019 Africa Cup of Nations qualification
2.	16 October 2018	Samuel Kanyon Doe Sports Complex, Monrovia, Liberia	Liberia	1–2	1–2	2019 Africa Cup of Nations qualification
3.	17 November 2019	Stade Alphonse Massemba-Débat, Brazzaville, Congo	Guinea-Bissau	1–0	3–0	2021 Africa Cup of Nations qualification
4.	12 November 2020	Stade Alphonse Massemba-Débat, Brazzaville, Congo	Eswatini	1–0	2–0	2021 Africa Cup of Nations qualification

== Honours ==
USM Alger

- Algerian Ligue Professionnelle 1: 2018–19.

Al-Wakrah

- Qatari Second Division: runner-up 2017–18

Bengaluru

- Durand Cup: 2022
