= 2018–19 Algerian Cup =

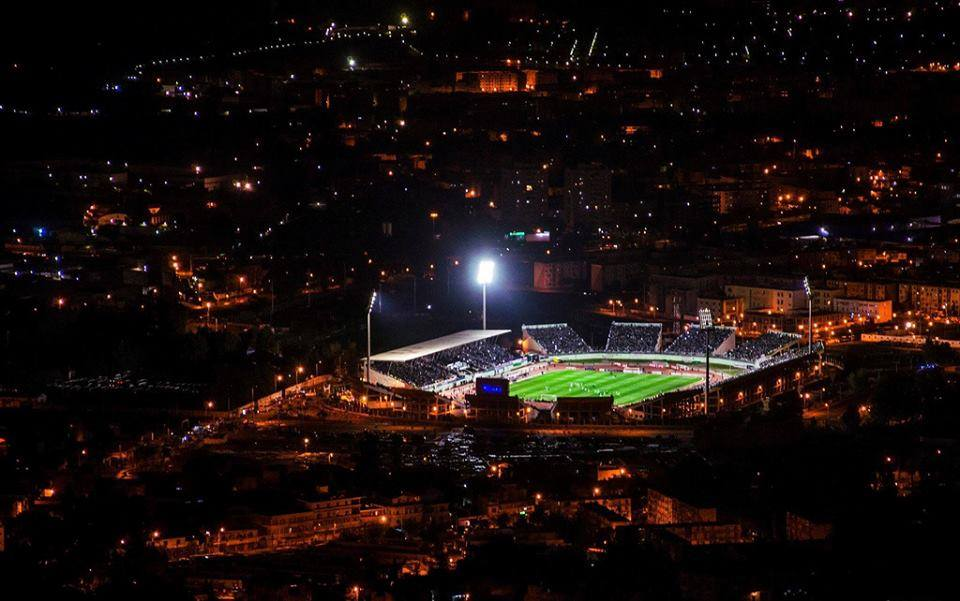
- Mustapha Tchaker Stadium hosted the final

Tournament details
- Country: Algeria
- Dates: 14 December 2018 – 8 June 2019
- Teams: 64 (as of first national round)

Final positions
- Champions: CR Belouizdad
- Runners-up: JSM Bejaïa

Tournament statistics
- Top goal scorer: Toufik El Ghoumari (USM Annaba) (4 goals)

The 2018–19 Algerian Cup (Arabic: كأس الجزائر 19-2018) was the 54th edition of the Algerian Cup. The winner qualified for the 2019–20 CAF Confederation Cup, The final was played in July 5, 1962 Stadium. CR Belouizdad were the eventual winners.

== Teams ==
| Round | Clubs remaining | Clubs involved | Winners from previous round | New entries this round | Leagues entering at this round |
Regional rounds
| First round | - | - | - | - | Ligue de Football de la Wilaya; Ligue Régional II; Ligue Régional I Inter-Régions Division |
| Second round | - | - | - | - | none |
| Third round | 192 | - | - | - | Ligue Nationale du Football Amateur; Algerian Ligue Professionnelle 2 |
| Fourth round | 96 | - | - | - | none |
National rounds
| Round of 64 | 64 | 64 | 48 | 16 | Algerian Ligue Professionnelle 1 |
| Round of 32 | 32 | 32 | 32 | none | none |
| Round of 16 | 16 | 16 | 16 | none | none |
| Quarter-finals | 8 | 8 | 8 | none | none |
| Semi-finals | 4 | 4 | 4 | none | none |
| Final | 2 | 2 | 2 | none | none |

== Regional rounds ==
=== Fourth regional round ===
These are the results of the last regional rounds played on 23–25 November 2018.

==== Ligue Régionale de Football d'Alger ====
LRF Alger (Algiers) - Fourth regional round

| 23 November 2018 | IB Lakhdaria (DNA) | 1–0 | JSM Cheraga (Inter-Régions) | Boumerdes |

| 23 November 2018 | JS Hai Djebel (DNA) | 0–1 | JSM Béjaïa (Ligue 2) | Bouira |

| 23 November 2018 | ES Ben Aknoun (DNA) | 1–2 | US Beni Douala (DNA) | Lakhdaria |

| 23 November 2018 | Olympique Akbou (Wilaya) | 2–0 | MB Bouira (Inter-Régions) | Azazga |

| 24 November 2018 | ESM Boudoaou (Régional I) | 0–0 (5–6 p) | USM El Harrach (Ligue 2) | Boumerdes |

| 24 November 2018 | ASG Belvedere (Régional II) | 0–2 | USM Draâ Ben Khedda (Régional I) | Boudouaou |

| 24 November 2018 | AS Sûreté Nationale (Wilaya) | 1–0 | RC Seddouk (Régional II) | Bouira |

| 24 November 2018 | RC Kouba (Ligue 2) | 3–3 (4–2 p) | ERB Ouled Moussa (Régional II) | Reghaïa |

==== Ligue Régionale de Football d'Oran ====
LRF Oran - Fourth regional round

| 24 November 2018 | CRM Bouguirat (Inter-Régions) | 1–0 | ES Mostaganem (Ligue 2) | Sidi Lakhdar |

| 24 November 2018 | FCB Abane Ramdane (Régional I) | 2–1 | RCB Oued Rhiou (DNA) | Sidi Ali |

| 24 November 2018 | CRB Sidi Ali (Régional I) | 1–2 | US Remchi (DNA) | Oran |
| | | | | Stadium: Allal Toula Stadium |

| 24 November 2018 | CRB Sfisef (Inter-Régions) | 1–2 | ICS Tlemcen (Inter-Régions) | Sidi Bel Abbès |

| 24 November 2018 | CRB Hennaya (Inter-Régions) | 1–2 | WA Tlemcen (Ligue 2) | Remchi |

| 24 November 2018 | JS Bedrabine (Régional II) | 0–2 | ASB Maghnia (DNA) | Tlemcen |

| 24 November 2018 | ASM Oran (Ligue 2) | 1–0 | SCM Oran (DNA) | Oran |
| | | | | Stadium: Habib Bouakeul Stadium |

==== Ligue Régionale de Football de Blida ====
LRF Blida - Fourth regional round

| 23 November 2018 | ASO Chlef (Ligue 2) | 0–1 (a.e.t.) | MS Cherchell (Régional I) | Khemis Miliana |

| 24 November 2018 | ORB Oued Fodda (Inter-Régions) | 0–1 | MCB Oued Sly (DNA) | Chlef |

| 24 November 2018 | RA Ain Defla (Inter-Régions) | 2–1 | IRB Bou Medfaa (Inter-Régions) | Khemis Miliana |

| 24 November 2018 | USM Blida (Ligue 2) | 3–0 | ESM Koléa (DNA) | Ahmar El Ain (Tipaza) |
| 14:00 | Feth Nour Aliouat 10'; Youcef Zerguine 38'; Abdelmalik Hadef 77'; Coach:Belhanafi | Repport | | Stadium: Ahmed Laadjel |
Note: Boutaga, Gatal, Hamida, Benichenacha, Mohammedi, Herbache, Houari (Belhadj 82'), Aliouat, Zerguine (Dadsi 84'), Keboub, Hadef (Guezair 80')

| 24 November 2018 | CRB Ain Oussera (DNA) | 2–0 | WA Boufarik (DNA) | Berrouaghia |

== National rounds ==
=== Round of 64 ===
| 17 December 2018 | A Bou Saâda | 2–1 | ORB Boumahra | Bou Saâda |
| 14:00 | Habchi 50'; Oukil 79' | [ Report] | Hichour 88' | Stadium: Stade Mokhtar Abdellatif; Referee: Ait Ameur, Malik, Kadem |

| 17 December 2018 | JS Guir Abadla | 0–2 | USM El Harrach | Stade communal (Abadla) |
| 14:00 | | [ Report] | Aouad 25' (pen.); Boumechra 89' | Referee: Benchehida, Saber, Oudene |

| 17 December 2018 | MC El Bayadh | 1–1 (a.e.t.) (1–4 p) | AS Ain M'lila | Zakaria El Madjdoub (Bayadh) |
| 14:00 | Ghendouzi 75' | [ Report] | 68' Ibrahim Si Ammar |

| 17 December 2018 | SA Sétif | 0–0 (a.e.t.) (2–3 p) | CRB Kais | Sétif 8 Mai 1945 |
| 14:00 | | [ Report] |

| 17 December 2018 | IH Chellala | 1–3 | USM Khenchela | Guelma |
| 14:00 | Deloum Abdelmalek 44' | [ Report] | Toufik Zermani 3'; Akram Abrouk 68'; Matib 72' | Stadium: Stade Souidani-Boudjemaa |

| 17 December 2018 | MB Rouissat | 1–1 (a.e.t.) (5–4 p) | JSM Tiaret |
| 14:00 | Azari 73' | [ Report] | 61' Abka |

| 17 December 2018 | Hamra Annaba | 0–2 | CR Village Moussa | Annaba |
| 14:00 | | [ Report] | Omar Slimatni 18'; Assam Benchouaib 55' | Stadium: Colonel Chabou Abdelkader Stadium |

| 17 December 2018 | MB Bazer Sakhra | 2–2 (a.e.t.) (5–3 p) | CR Beni Thour |
| 16:00 | | [ Report] |

| 17 December 2018 | JSM Béjaïa | 2–1 | JSM Skikda | Béjaïa |
| 17:00 | Beniaiche 36' (pen.); Khezri 42' | [ Report] | 82' Gasmi | Stadium: Stade de l'Unité Maghrébine |

| 18 December 2018 | MBS Oued Sly | 1–3 | USM Annaba |
| 15:00 | | [ Report] |

| 18 December 2018 | USM Alger | 2–0 | ASM Oran | Bologhine |
| 18:00 | Benyahia 25'; Benguit 90' | [ Report] | | Stadium: Omar Hamadi Stadium; Referee: Abderrezzak Arab |

| 27 December 2018 | IB Lakhdaria | 0–0 (4–3 p) | JS Saoura |
| 15:00 | | [ Report] |

| 18 December 2018 | DRB Tadjenanet | 0–2 | CR Belouizdad | Tadjenanet |
| 17:00 | | [ Report] | 28' Balegh; 53' Bechou | Stadium: Lahoua Smaïl Stadium |

| 19 December 2018 | MSP Batna | 1–1 (1–4 p) | CR Bouguirat | Batna |
| 15:00 | | [ Report] | | Stadium: November 1, 1954 Stadium |

| 18 December 2018 | GC Mascara | 0–1 | CA Bordj Bou Arréridj | Mascara |
| 15:00 | | [ Report] | 90' ? | Stadium: Stade de l'Unité Africaine |

| 18 December 2018 | SA Mohammadia | 2–1 | USM Sétif | Mohammadia |
| 15:00 | | [ Report] | | Stadium: Stade Ouali Mohamed |

| 18 December 2018 | MO Béjaïa | 2–0 | Olympique Magran | Béjaïa |
| 18:00 | Boukhanchouche 43' (pen.); Soltani 90' | [ Report] | | Stadium: Stade de l'Unité Maghrébine; Referee: Maskri |

| 27 December 2018 | Olympique Akbou | 0–2 | NA Hussein Dey |
| 15:00 | | [ Report] |

| 18 December 2018 | US Béni Douala | 2–1 | ICS Tlemcen | Tizi Ouzou |
| 15:00 | | [ Report] | | Stadium: November 1, 1954 Stadium |

| 19 December 2018 | US Remchi | 1–0 | MC El Eulma |
| 15:00 | | [ Report] |

| 21 December 2018 | AS Sûreté Nationale | 1–2 (a.e.t.) | CRB Aïn Oussera |
| 15:00 | | [ Report] |

| 18 December 2018 | CA Batna | 1–0 | ESB Besbes | Batna |
| 15:00 | | [ Report] | | Stadium: November 1, 1954 Stadium |

| 18 December 2018 | USM Blida | 2–3 (a.e.t.) | Paradou AC | Blida |
| 15:00 | Zerguine 65'; Aliouet 90+4' | [ Report] | 2' Benayad; 14' Herrari; 105' Bouguerra | Stadium: Stade Mustapha-Tchaker; Referee: Nader |

| 18 December 2018 | WA Tlemcen | 1–0 | USMD Ben Khedda | Tlemcen |
| 16:00 | | [ Report] | | Stadium: Stade Akid Lotfi |

| 18 December 2018 | ARB Ghriss | 2–0 | JS Kabylie | Ghriss |
| 15:00 | Daoudi 52'; Hamsas 87' | [ Report] | | Stadium: Stade Boudjelel Laoucedj; Referee: Fasih |

| 18 December 2018 | MC Oran | 3–2 | ASB Maghnia | Oran |
| 15:00 | Boudebouda 18', 45'; Toumi 43' | [ Report] | 37', 63' Saidi | Stadium: Ahmed Zabana Stadium; Attendance: 5,000; Referee: Hamza Boucetta |

| 19 December 2018 | RA Aïn Defla | 1–0 | NT Souf | Aïn Defla |
| 14:00 | | [ Report] | | Stadium: Stade Abdelkader Khelal |

| 19 December 2018 | ES Sétif | 1–0 | Olympique de Médéa | Sétif |
| 18:00 | Banouh 10' | [ Report] | | Stadium: Stade 8 Mai 1945 |

| 27 December 2018 | CS Constantine | 3–1 | RC Bougaa | Constantine |
| 15:00 | | [ Report] | | Stadium: Stade Mohamed Hamlaoui |

| 19 December 2018 | NC Magra | 1–0 | FCB Abane Ramdane |
| 14:00 | | [ Report] |

| 27 December 2018 | USM Bel Abbès | 2–0 | MS Cherchell | Sidi Bel Abbès |
| 15:00 | | [ Report] | | Stadium: Stade 24 Fevrier 1956 |

| 20 December 2018 | RC Kouba | 0–3 | MC Alger | Kouba |
| 17:00 | | [ Report] | | Stadium: Omar Benhaddad Stadium |

=== Round of 32 ===
| 28 December 2018 | CR Bouguirat | 1–1 (a.e.t.) (4–2 p) | CRB Kais | Bouguirat |
| 14:30 | | [ Report] |

| 28 December 2018 | CA Bordj Bou Arréridj | 0–0 (a.e.t.) (6–5 p) | WA Tlemcen | Bordj Bou Arréridj |
| 16:00 | | [ Report] | | Stadium: 20 August 1955 Stadium |

| 28 December 2018 | SA Mohammadia | 1–0 | ARB Ghriss | Mohammadia |
| 14:30 | | [ Report] | | Stadium: Mohamed Ouali Stadium |

| 28 December 2018 | USM Annaba | 3–0 | MB Bazer Sakhra | Annaba |
| 14:30 | | [ Report] | | Stadium: 19 May 1956 Stadium |

| 28 December 2018 | RA Aïn Defla | 1–2 | MC Oran | Aïn Defla |
| 14:30 | Mekkioui 57' | Report | Toumi 7'; Boudebouda 13' | Stadium: Abdelkader Khelal Stadium |

| 28 December 2018 | AS Ain M'lila | 1–2 (a.e.t.) | JSM Béjaïa | Batna |
| 15:00 | Si Ammar 76' | [ Report] | Khazri 29'; Allali 97' | Stadium: 1 November 1954 Stadium |

| 29 December 2018 | US Remchi | 0–3 | NC Magra | Remchi |
| 14:00 | | [ Report] | | Stadium: 18 February Stadium |

| 29 December 2018 | USM El Harrach | 1–0 (a.e.t.) | MO Béjaïa | El Harrach |
| 15:00 | Fares Benabderrahmane 109' | [ Report] | | Stadium: 1 November 1954 Stadium |

| 29 December 2018 | CA Batna | 0–1 | CR Belouizdad | Batna |
| 14:00 | | [ Report] | | Stadium: Mustapha Seffouhi Stadium |

| 30 December 2018 | US Béni Douala | 0–2 | Paradou AC | Tizi Ouzou |
| 15:00 | | [ Report] | | Stadium: 1 November 1954 Stadium |

| 31 December 2018 | IB Lakhdaria | 0–1 | CS Constantine | Lakhdaria |
| 14:00 / 18:00 | | [ Report] | | Stadium: Mansour Khodja Stadium / 20 August 1955 Stadium |

| 31 December 2018 | USM Khenchela | 1–1 (a.e.t.) (7–8 p) | NA Hussein Dey | Khenchela |
| 14:00 | | [ Report] | | Stadium: Amar Hammam Stadium |

| 31 December 2018 | USM Alger | 2–1 (a.e.t.) | USM Bel Abbès | Algiers |
| 17:09 | Ardji 45'; Hamia 107' | [ Report] | Benayad 49' | Stadium: Omar Hamadi Stadium; Referee: Rafik Achouri |

| 1 January 2019 | CR Village Moussa | 0–3 | MC Alger | Jijel |
| 16:00 | | Match stopped at 41' due to supporters violence [ Report] | | Stadium: Rouibah Hocine Stadium |

| 1 January 2019 | MB Rouissat | 2–0 | CRB Aïn Oussera | Ghardaïa |
| 14:00 | | [ Report] | | Stadium: OPOW Stadium |

| 15 January 2019 | A Bou Saâda | 0–1 | ES Sétif | Bou Saâda |
| 14:00 | | [ Report] | | Stadium: Mokhtar Abdellatif Stadium |

=== Round of 16 ===
| 21 January 2019 | CR Belouizdad | 3–0 | SA Mohammadia | Belouizdad |
| 15:00 | Chettal 46'; Sayoud 71'; Balegh 85' | [ Report] | | Stadium: Stade 20 Août 1955; Referee: Yazid Ibrir |

| 21 January 2019 | USM Annaba | 3–1 | CA Bordj Bou Arréridj | Annaba |
| 16:00 | Elghomari 9', 24'; Ammour 71' | [ Report] | Droueche 52' | Stadium: May 19, 1956 Stadium; Referee: Lyés Bekouassa |

| 21 January 2019 | JSM Béjaïa | 4–1 | CR Bouguirat | Béjaïa |
| 17:00 | Mokhtar 4', 30'; Ghanem 65', 67' | [ Report] | Mghani 52' | Stadium: Stade de l'Unité Maghrébine; Referee: Facih |

| 22 January 2019 | Paradou AC | 3–0 | USM El Harrach | Bologhine |
| 14:30 | Zakaria Naidji 51'; Loucif 90+2'; Benayad 90+2' | [ Report] | | Stadium: Omar Hamadi Stadium; Referee: Farouk Mial |

| 22 January 2019 | ES Sétif | 3–1 | USM Alger | Sétif |
| 17:00 | Bedrane 3'; Ferhani 51'; Djabou 79' | [ Report] | Cherifi 48' (pen.) | Stadium: Stade 8 Mai 1945; Referee: Redouane Necib |

| 23 January 2019 | MB Rouissat | 1–2 | CS Constantine | Ghardaïa |
| 15:00 | Bouti Sayeh 1' | [ Report] | 51' Nassim Yattou; 79' Houcine Benayada | Stadium: OPOW Stadium; Referee: Merzoug Brahimi |

| 23 January 2019 | NA Hussein Dey | 1–0 | MC Alger | Belouizdad |
| 15:00 | Ahmed Gasmi 84' (pen.) | [ Report] | | Stadium: Stade 20 Août 1955; Referee: Said Aouina |

| 29 January 2019 | MC Oran | 2–0 (a.e.t.) | NC Magra | Oran |
| 17:00 | Mansouri 105' (pen.); Benrezoug 109' | [ Report] | | Stadium: Ahmed Zabana Stadium |

=== Quarter-finals ===
| 19 February 2019 1st leg | USM Annaba | 2–0 | ES Sétif | Annaba |
| 15:00 | Sahbi 18'; Rebiai 58' (pen.) | | | Stadium: May 19, 1956 Stadium; Referee: Mohamed Saidi |

| 27 February 2019 2nd leg | ES Sétif | 4–0 | USM Annaba | Sétif |
| 17:00 | Bouguelmouna 30', 71'; Bakir 73'; Ghacha 90+3' | | | Stadium: 8 May 1945 Stadium; Referee: Nabil Boukhalfa |

| 19 February 2019 1st leg | CR Belouizdad | 0–1 | NA Hussein Dey | Algiers |
| 15:00 | | | Khacef 36' | Stadium: Stade du 5 Juillet 1962; Referee: Mehdi Abid Charef |

| 28 March 2019 2nd leg | NA Hussein Dey | 1–3 | CR Belouizdad | Algiers |
| 17:00 | Yaya 42' | | Keddad 29', 60'; Sayoud 83' (pen.) | Referee: Lotfi Bekouassa |

| 9 March 2019 1st leg | JSM Béjaïa | 0–0 | Paradou AC | Béjaïa |
| 17:00 | | | | Stadium: Stade de l'Unité Maghrébine; Referee: Mustapha Bessiri |

| 30 March 2019 2nd leg | Paradou AC | 1–1 | JSM Béjaïa | Bologhine |
| 15:00 | Zorgane 37' | | Daouadji 49' | Stadium: Omar Hamadi Stadium; Referee: Ali Nader |

| 12 March 2019 1st leg | CS Constantine | 1–1 | MC Oran | Constantine |
| 15:00 | Belkacemi 89' | Report | El Moudene 80' | Stadium: Mohamed Hamlaoui Stadium; Referee: Lotfi Bekouassa |

| 28 March 2019 2nd leg | MC Oran | 1–1 (a.e.t.) (4–5 p) | CS Constantine | Oran |
| 17:00 | Nadji 58' | | Zaâlani 68' | Stadium: Ahmed Zabana Stadium; Referee: Said Aouina |
| | Penalties |
| | Nadji (penalty scored); Halaïmia (penalty scored); Boudebouda (penalty scored); Mansouri (penalty scored); Aouadj (penalty missed); Mahammedi (penalty missed) | | (penalty missed) Abid; (penalty scored) Belkheir; (penalty scored) Lamri; (penalty scored) Benayada; (penalty scored) Djabout; (penalty scored) Gagaa |

=== Semi-finals ===
| 16 April 2019 1st leg | ES Sétif | 1–2 | JSM Béjaïa | Sétif |
| 17:00 | Djahnit 60' | | Niati 70'; Baiteche 89' | Stadium: 8 May 1945 Stadium; Referee: Lotfi Bekouassa |

| 25 April 2019 2nd leg | JSM Béjaïa | 0–1 | ES Sétif | Béjaïa |
| 17:00 | | | Samir Aiboud 14' | Stadium: Stade de l'Unité Maghrébine; Attendance: 18,000; Referee: Hamza Bouslimani |

| 17 April 2019 1st leg | CS Constantine | 1–0 | CR Belouizdad | Constantine |
| 17:00 | Abid 68' | | | Stadium: Mohamed Hamlaoui Stadium; Referee: Lahlou Benbraham |

| 24 April 2019 2nd leg | CR Belouizdad | 2–0 (a.e.t.) | CS Constantine | Belouizdad |
| 16:00 | Adel Djerrar 74'; Rayen Hais Benderrouya 99' | | | Stadium: Stade 20 Août 1955; Referee: Missoum Benabdellah |

=== Final ===
June 8, 2019
17:00

| CR Belouizdad | 2 - 0 | JSM Béjaïa |
|---|---|---|
| Sayoud 76'; Bousseliou 90+5' | Report |

Mustapha Tchaker Stadium, Blida
Attendance: 28,000
Referee: Mohamed Saïdi
