= Lamine Kebir =

Algerian football manager

Personal information
- Date of birth: 1 August 1968 (age 58)
- Place of birth: Algiers, Algeria

Managerial career
- Years: Team
- 2010: Algeria (assistant)
- 2013: ASO Chlef
- 2013–2014: ASO Chlef (assistant)
- 2014: ASO Chlef
- 2015: JS Kabylie (assistant)
- 2015: JS Kabylie
- 2016: JSM Béjaïa
- 2016: CS Constantine
- 2019: USM Alger (assistant)
- 2019: USM Alger
- 2019: MC Alger (director of sports)

Lamine Kebir (born 1 August 1968) is an Algerian football manager.
