= Rafik Bouderbal =

French footballer (born 1987)

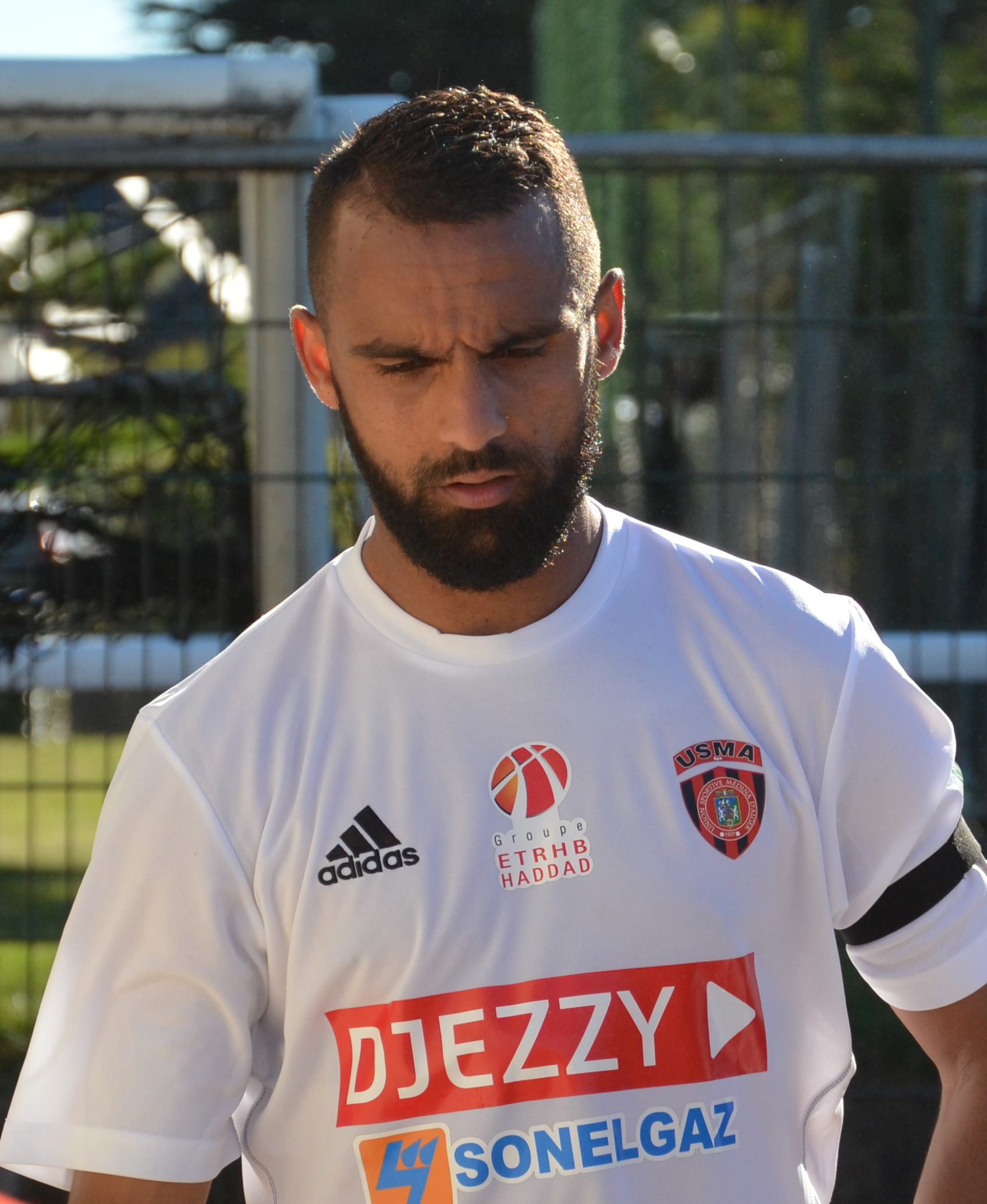
- Bouderbal with USM Alger in 2016

Personal information
- Date of birth: 19 September 1987 (age 39)
- Place of birth: Lyon, France
- Height: 1.76 m (5 ft 9 in)
- Position: Winger

Youth career
- –2007: Saint-Priest
- 2007–2009: Lorient

Senior career*
Years	Team	Apps	(Gls)
2009–2011	Lorient	0	(0)
2009–2010	→ ES Sétif (loan)	8	(1)
2011–2013	Lyon Duchère	32	(5)
2013	Beauvais	3	(0)
2013–2014	Bourg-Péronnas	24	(1)
2014–2015	RC Arbaâ	17	(0)
2015–2016	Lyon Duchère	25	(3)
2016–2019	USM Alger	40	(2)
2019–2020	Lyon Duchère	24	(2)
2020–2021	Sète	24	(0)
- * Club domestic league appearances and goals

Rafik Bouderbal (born 19 September 1987) is a French professional footballer who plays as a winger.

== Personal life ==
Rafik Bouderbal was born in Lyon. His family is originally from the Bab Ezzouar district of Algiers. He holds both French and Algerian nationalities.

== Club career ==
On 20 January 2009, Bouderbal signed a two and a half year professional contract with Lorient.

=== ES Sétif ===
On 30 September 2009, Bouderbal was loaned out to Algerian club ES Sétif until the end of the season. On 6 November 2009, he made his league debut for ES Sétif in a league game against USM El Harrach, coming as a substitute in the 55th minute. On 25 December 2009, he scored his first goal for the club in a cup game against US Doucen. Bouderbal made a total of 8 league appearances, scoring 1 goal, during his loan period with the club.

=== Lyon-Duchère (Sporting Club Lyon) ===
Bouderbal moved to AS Lyon-Duchère in 2011, the first of three spells at the club encompassing five seasons (2011–13, 2015–16 and 2019–20, when the team had rebranded as Sporting Club Lyon). He made 81 league appearances for the club in total.

=== Beauvais and Bourg-en-Bresse ===
Bouderbal's first spell with Lyon-Duchère ended in January 2013, when he left the club to sign for fellow Championnat de France Amateur club AS Beauvais Oise. At the end of the season he moved to FC Bourg-Péronnas, who were reprieved from relegation, giving him another opportunity to play in Championnat National.

=== RC Arbaâ ===
Bouderbal spent a second spell in Algeria, with RC Arbaâ, in 2014–15, but left early due to a financial dispute, returning to France after negotiations to join MC Alger broke down. Back in France, he returned to Lyon-Duchère.

=== USM Alger ===
Bouderbal joined USM Alger in the summer of 2016, at the end of his second Lyon-Duchère spell. By February 2017 he was allowed to leave due to family problems. He returned to the club in December 2017. He finally ended his time with USM Alger in June 2019, returning to Lyon-Duchère.

=== FC Sète 34 ===
In July 2020, Bouderbal signed for FC Sète 34, newly promoted to Championnat National.

== Honours ==
=== Club ===
USM Alger

- Algerian Ligue Professionnelle 1: 2018–19
- Algerian Super Cup: 2016
