= 2018–19 Algerian Ligue Professionnelle 1 =

Algerian Ligue Professionnelle 1
- Season: 2018–19
- Dates: 10 August 2018 – 26 May 2019
- Champions: USM Alger; 3rd Ligue 1 title 8th Algerian title
- Relegated: MO Béjaïa; DRB Tadjenanet; Olympique de Médéa
- Champions League: USM Alger; JS Kabylie
- Confederation Cup: Paradou AC; CR Belouizdad
- Matches: 240
- Goals: 476 (1.98 per match)
- Top goalscorer: Zakaria Naidji (20 goals)
- Biggest home win: USM Alger 5-1 MO Béjaïa (15 October 2018)
- Biggest away win: MC Alger 0-5 JS Kabylie (16 September 2018)
- Highest scoring: Olympique de Médéa 2-4 MO Béjaïa (11 August 2018)
- Longest winning run: 4 matches JS Kabylie
- Longest unbeaten run: 11 matches USM Alger
- Longest winless run: 11 matches AS Ain M'lila
- Longest losing run: 4 matches DRB Tadjenanet; CR Belouizdad
- All statistics correct as of 26 May 2019.

The 2018–19 Algerian Ligue Professionnelle 1 was the 57th season of the Algerian Ligue Professionnelle 1 since its establishment in 1962. A total of 16 teams contested in the league.

== Teams ==
16 teams contest the league. MO Bejaia, Ain M'lila and CABB Arreridj were promoted from the 2017-18 Ligue 2.

Locations of teams for the 2018–19 Algerian Ligue Professionnelle 1

=== Stadiums ===
Note: Table lists in alphabetical order.

All Derby matches between CR Belouizdad, MC Alger, NA Hussein Dey, USM Alger and Paradou AC will be played on July 5, 1962 Stadium which seats 64,000 spectators.

Team	Home city	Stadium	Capacity
AS Aïn M'lila	Aïn M'lila	Zoubir Khelifi Touhami Stadium	8,000
CA Bordj Bou Arréridj	Bordj Bou Arréridj	20 August 1955 Stadium	25,000
CR Belouizdad	Algiers	20 August 1955 Stadium	10,000
CS Constantine	Constantine	Mohamed Hamlaoui Stadium	40,000
DRB Tadjenanet	Tadjenanet	Smaïl Lahoua Stadium	9,000
ES Sétif	Sétif	8 May 1945 Stadium	25,000
JS Kabylie	Tizi Ouzou	1 November 1954 Stadium	15,000
JS Saoura	Béchar	20 August 1955 Stadium	20,000
MC Alger	Algiers	Stade 5 Juillet 1962	64,000
MC Oran	Oran	Ahmed Zabana Stadium	40,000
MO Béjaïa	Béjaïa	Maghrebi Unity Stadium	18,000
NA Hussein Dey	Algiers	20 August 1955 Stadium	10,000
Olympique de Médéa	Médéa	Lyes Imam Stadium	12,000
Paradou AC	Algiers	Omar Hamadi Stadium	10,000
USM Alger	Algiers	Omar Hamadi Stadium	10,000
USM Bel Abbès	Sidi Bel Abbès	24 February 1956 Stadium	45,000

=== Personnel and kits ===
Team	Manager^{1}	Captain	Kit manufacturer
AS Aïn M'lila	(Serbia) Darko Janacković	(Algeria) Rabah Ziad	Nafo
CA Bordj Bou Arréridj	(Algeria) Billel Dziri	(Algeria) Messaoud Gharbi	Umbro
CR Belouizdad	(Algeria) Lotfi Amrouche	(Algeria) Bilal Tarikat	Kelme
CS Constantine	(Algeria) vacant	(Algeria) Sid Ali Lamri	Joma
DRB Tadjenanet	(Algeria) Lamine Boughrara	(Algeria) Mohammed Achref Aib	Joma
ES Sétif	(Algeria) Noureddine Zekri	(Algeria) Abdelmoumene Djabou	Joma
JS Kabylie	(France) Franck Dumas	(Algeria) Nabil Saâdou	Macron
JS Saoura	(Algeria) Nabil Neghiz	(Algeria) Sid Ali Yahia-Chérif	Joma
MC Alger	(Algeria) Adel Amrouche	(Algeria) Abderahmane Hachoud	Umbro
MC Oran	(France) Jean-Michel Cavalli	(Algeria) Zine El Abidine Sebbah	Kelme
MO Béjaïa	(Algeria) Kheireddine Madoui	(Algeria) Billel Bouldiab	Joma
NA Hussein Dey	(Algeria) vacant	(Algeria) Ahmed Gasmi	Uhlsport
Olympique de Médéa	(Algeria) Taoufik Rouabah	(Algeria) Toufik Addadi	Joma
Paradou AC	(Portugal) Francisco Chaló	(Algeria) Mustapha Bouchina	Macron
USM Alger	(France) Thierry Froger	(Algeria) Mohamed Lamine Zemmamouche	Joma
USM Bel Abbès	(Algeria) Youcef Bouzidi	(Algeria) Zakaria Khali	Baeko

=== Foreign players ===
Club	Player 1	Player 2
CR Belouizdad	(Mali) Soumaila Sidibe	(Guinea) Mohamed Thiam
CA Bordj Bou Arréridj	(Mali) ~~Ismaila Diarra~~ (Republic of the Congo) Kader Bidimbou	(Ivory Coast) Isla Daoudi Diomandé
CS Constantine	(Burkina Faso) ~~Ousmane Sylla~~ (Republic of the Congo) Dylan Bahamboula	(Burkina Faso) ~~Abdoul Rahim Kagambega~~ (Cameroon) Arouna Dang Bissene
DRB Tadjenanet	(Niger) Youssouf Oumarou Alio	
AS Aïn M'lila	(Republic of the Congo) ~~Ronel Kangou~~	(Burkina Faso) Ousmane Sylla
ES Sétif	(Ivory Coast) ~~Isla Daoudi Diomandé~~	
MC Alger	(Madagascar) Ibrahim Amada	(Mali) Aliou Dieng
MC Oran	(Mali) ~~Kodjo Doussé~~	(Ivory Coast) Vivien Assie Koua
JS Kabylie	(Burundi) Abdul Razak Fiston	(Nigeria) Uche Nwofor
JS Saoura	(Senegal) Elhadji Konaté	(Guinea) ~~Saïdouba Camara~~ (Tanzania) Thomas Ulimwengu
USM Alger	(Cameroon) ~~Mexes Nyeck Bayiha~~ (Libya) Muaid Ellafi	(Republic of the Congo) Prince Ibara
NA Hussein Dey	(Tunisia) Mehdi Ouertani	(Mali) ~~Moctar Cissé~~ (Cameroon) Landry Ntankeu Tchatchet
MO Béjaïa	(Mali) Malick Touré	(Mali) ~~Moussa Camara~~ (Benin) Jacques Bessan
Olympique de Médéa	(Mali) Lamine Traoré	(Mali) Massire Dembele

== League table ==
Pos	Team	Pld	W	D	L	GF	GA	GD	Pts	Qualification or relegation
1	USM Alger (C)	30	15	8	7	49	29	+20	53	Qualification for Champions League
2	JS Kabylie	30	15	7	8	38	25	+13	52	Qualification for Champions League
3	Paradou AC	30	14	6	10	38	24	+14	48	Qualification for Confederation Cup
4	JS Saoura	30	13	8	9	33	22	+11	47	Qualification for Arab Club Champions Cup
5	ES Sétif	30	13	6	11	34	24	+10	45	
6	MC Alger	30	11	10	9	35	36	−1	43	Qualification for Arab Club Champions Cup
7	CS Constantine	30	10	10	10	30	24	+6	40	Qualification for Arab Club Champions Cup
8	CR Belouizdad	30	10	11	9	28	27	+1	38 (Note: CR Belouizdad were deducted 3 points.)	Qualification for Confederation Cup (Note: CR Belouizdad are Algerian Cup winners.)
9	CA Bordj Bou Arreridj	30	9	10	11	22	24	−2	37	
10	MC Oran	30	8	12	10	33	38	−5	36 (Note: Head-to-head: MC Oran 7 points; NA Hussein Dey 5 points; AS Aïn M'lila 3 points.)	
11	NA Hussein Dey	30	9	9	12	22	29	−7	36	
12	AS Aïn M'lila	30	7	15	8	20	30	−10	36	
13	USM Bel Abbès	30	9	8	13	24	39	−15	35	
14	MO Béjaïa (R)	30	7	12	11	23	36	−13	33	Relegation to Ligue 2
15	DRB Tadjenanet (R)	30	7	10	13	26	38	−12	31 (Note: Head-to-head: DRB Tadjenanet 4 points; Olympique de Médéa 1 point.)	Relegation to Ligue 2
16	Olympique de Médéa (R)	30	7	10	13	21	31	−10	31	Relegation to Ligue 2

Source: DZFoot
Rules for classification: 1) points; 2) head-to-head points; 3) head-to-head goal difference; 4) goal difference; 5) total goals; 6) fairplay ranking; 7) playoff.
(C) Champions; (R) Relegated

== Results ==
Home \ Away	ASA	CBA	CRB	CSC	DRB	ESS	JSK	JSR	MCA	MCO	MOB	PAC	NAH	OMM	UAL	UBA
AS Ain M'lila		1–0	1–1	0–0	2–0	1–0	0–0	0–0	1–1	0–0	2–1	1–0	1–1	0–0	0–0	1–0
CA Bordj Bou Arreridj	2–0		0–0	0–0	1–0	1–2	1–0	2–0	0–1	3–1	1–1	1–0	0–0	1–0	1–1	3–1
CR Belouizdad	0–3	1–1		2–1	2–1	1–0	2–1	1–1	0–0	0–1	4–1	0–0	2–0	0–1	0–1	1–0
CS Constantine	0–0	1–0	1–1		3–3	1–1	2–0	1–0	2–0	0–0	1–0	2–0	1–1	0–0	1–3	3–0
DRB Tadjenanet	0–0	3–1	0–0	0–0		2–0	2–1	1–0	0–1	0–0	1–2	1–0	1–2	1–0	1–0	0–0
ES Sétif	4–0	1–0	3–2	2–0	1–1		0–1	0–1	2–0	4–1	2–0	1–1	0–1	1–0	1–1	3–0
JS Kabylie	1–1	2–0	1–0	0–2	3–2	1–0		0–0	1–1	4–2	1–0	1–0	2–1	1–1	2–1	3–1
JS Saoura	4–1	0–1	2–0	3–1	2–0	2–1	0–1		4–3	2–0	0–0	2–2	1–0	0–0	3–0	3–0
MC Alger	4–2	0–0	1–1	2–1	4–1	0–1	0–5	0–0		1–0	0–0	1–1	2–1	2–1	3–2	0–1
MC Oran	3–1	1–1	1–1	1–0	3–1	0–1	0–0	1–1	4–3		0–0	0–2	3–2	1–0	0–0	2–2
MO Béjaïa	0–0	0–0	1–0	1–0	2–2	1–0	1–1	0–1	1–1	0–3		1–0	1–2	1–1	0–0	1–0
Paradou AC	3–0	2–0	0–0	1–0	3–0	1–0	2–0	2–0	0–1	3–2	3–0		2–1	3–0	1–3	1–2
NA Hussein Dey	1–1	1–0	0–2	0–1	0–0	0–0	1–2	1–0	1–0	1–0	1–0	2–1		0–0	0–1	0–0
Olympique de Médéa	0–0	1–0	0–1	1–0	1–1	2–2	1–0	0–1	1–2	1–1	2–4	0–1	1–0		1–3	2–0
USM Alger	3–0	3–1	2–3	2–1	3–1	0–1	1–0	2–0	0–0	1–1	5–1	1–2	4–1	3–1		1–0
USM Bel Abbès	1–0	0–0	1–0	0–4	1–0	2–0	0–2	1–0	2–1	3–1	2–2	1–1	0–0	1–2	2–2	

Updated to match(es) played on 26 May 2019. Source: DZFoot
Legend: Blue = home team win; Yellow = draw; Red = away team win.

== Positions by round ==
Team ╲ Round	1	2	3	4	5	6	7	8	9	10	11	12	13	14	15	16	17	18	19	20	21	22	23	24	25	26	27	28	29	30
USM Alger	4	2	1	1	1	2	2	1	1	1	2	1	1	1	1	1	1	1	1	1	1	1	1	1	1	1	1	1	1	1
JS Kabylie	10	9	4	7	3	1	1	2	2	2	1	2	3	2	2	2	2	2	2	2	2	2	2	3	3	3	3	2	2	2
ES Sétif	1	6	7	5	2	3	4	5	4	3	3	3	2	3	3	3	3	5	3	7	7	6	7	5	6	5	5	4	5	5
NA Hussein Dey	5	12	9	8	6	4	5	3	3	4	5	4	4	6	5	6	7	8	8	8	8	8	8	8	8	8	8	8	9	11
MC Alger	12	5	5	9	7	9	11	7	8	5	4	5	5	7	6	4	4	3	5	4	5	4	5	4	4	4	7	6	7	6
JS Saoura	9	4	8	4	9	10	12	8	5	6	6	7	6	4	4	5	6	4	6	6	6	5	6	7	5	6	4	5	4	4
CS Constantine	7	10	6	10	4	6	3	4	6	7	7	6	7	8	8	7	5	6	4	3	4	7	4	6	7	7	6	7	6	7
MO Béjaïa	3	3	3	3	8	8	8	11	7	8	8	11	11	12	10	9	11	13	15	13	15	15	15	15	14	15	15	16	14	14
MC Oran	6	13	13	15	11	13	9	6	10	10	10	8	9	9	9	11	10	9	9	9	10	10	10	13	12	13	14	12	13	10
CA Bordj Bou Arreridj	8	11	12	12	14	12	14	14	9	11	13	12	13	13	13	10	12	11	12	10	9	9	9	9	9	10	10	10	8	9
AS Ain M'lila	2	1	2	2	5	7	7	9	11	11	11	10	10	11	12	13	14	12	11	12	13	12	13	10	13	11	12	11	10	12
Olympique de Médéa	13	7	10	11	12	11	10	12	12	13	12	13	12	10	11	12	9	10	10	11	12	13	14	14	15	14	16	14	16	16
Paradou AC	11	8	11	6	12	5	6	10	13	9	9	8	8	5	7	8	8	7	7	5	3	3	3	2	2	2	2	3	3	3
DRB Tadjenanet	14	14	14	16	13	14	13	13	14	14	14	14	14	15	15	15	15	14	13	14	11	14	11	12	11	12	11	15	15	15
USM Bel Abbès	15	15	15	13	15	15	15	15	15	15	15	15	15	14	14	14	13	15	14	15	16	16	16	16	16	16	13	13	11	13
CR Belouizdad	16	16	16	14	16	16	16	16	16	16	16	16	16	16	16	16	16	16	16	16	14	11	12	11	10	9	9	9	12	8

Leader
2019–20 CAF Champions League
2019–20 CAF Confederation Cup
Relegation to Ligue Professionnelle 2 2018-19

Updated to match(es) played on 21 May 2019. Source: DZfoot.com (in French)

== Clubs season-progress ==
Team ╲ Round	1	2	3	4	5	6	7	8	9	10	11	12	13	14	15	16	17	18	19	20	21	22	23	24	25	26	27	28	29	30
AS Ain M'lila	W	W	D	D	L	D	L	D	L	D	D	W	D	L	D	D	L	D	D	D	D	D	D	W	L	W	L	W	W	L
CR Belouizdad	L	D	D	W	L	L	L	L	D	L	W	D	L	W	L	D	D	D	D	W	W	W	D	W	W	W	D	D	L	W
CS Constantine	D	D	W	L	W	D	W	L	D	L	D	W	D	D	L	W	W	L	W	W	D	L	W	L	D	L	W	L	D	L
CA Bordj Bou Arreridj	D	D	L	D	L	W	D	D	W	L	D	D	L	L	W	W	L	D	L	W	W	D	W	L	W	D	D	L	W	L
DRB Tadjenanet	L	L	L	L	W	D	W	D	L	L	D	L	D	D	W	W	L	D	D	L	W	L	W	D	W	L	D	L	D	L
ES Sétif	W	L	D	W	W	D	D	L	W	W	W	L	W	L	L	L	W	L	W	L	L	W	L	W	D	D	D	W	L	W
JS Kabylie	D	D	W	D	W	W	W	W	D	W	D	L	L	W	L	W	W	W	D	L	D	L	W	L	L	W	L	W	W	W
JS Saoura	D	W	L	W	L	L	L	W	W	D	D	D	W	W	D	L	D	W	L	W	L	W	D	L	W	L	W	D	W	W
MC Alger	D	W	D	L	W	L	L	W	D	W	W	D	D	L	D	W	W	D	L	W	D	W	L	W	L	D	L	D	L	W
MC Oran	D	L	D	L	W	L	W	W	L	D	D	L	D	D	L	L	D	W	D	D	L	L	D	L	W	L	D	W	D	W
MO Béjaïa	W	D	D	W	L	L	D	L	L	D	D	L	D	L	W	D	L	L	L	D	L	D	D	D	W	L	W	D	W	L
NA Hussein Dey	D	L	W	D	W	W	D	D	W	L	L	W	D	L	W	L	L	D	W	L	W	D	D	L	W	L	D	L	L	L
Olympique de Médéa	L	W	D	L	L	W	D	D	D	D	D	L	D	W	D	D	W	D	L	L	L	L	L	W	L	W	L	W	L	L
Paradou AC	D	D	D	W	L	W	L	L	L	W	D	W	D	W	L	L	D	W	W	W	W	W	W	W	L	W	L	L	L	W
USM Alger	W	W	W	L	W	D	W	W	D	W	L	W	W	D	W	L	W	D	W	D	W	D	L	L	L	D	W	L	D	W
USM Bel Abbès	L	L	L	W	L	D	D	D	L	D	D	L	D	W	W	W	L	L	D	L	L	D	L	W	L	W	W	W	W	L

Updated to match(es) played on 21 May 2019. Source: Clubs Season-Progress
W = Win; D = Draw; L = Lose

== Season statistics ==
=== Top scorers ===
R.	Goalscorer	Team	Goal	Penalty scored	avg.
1	(Algeria) Zakaria Naidji	Paradou AC	20	0	0.71
2	(Algeria) Karim Aribi	DRB Tadjenanet	10	4	0.67
3	(Algeria) Habib Bouguelmouna	ES Sétif	9	3	0.82
3	(Republic of the Congo) Prince Ibara	USM Alger	9	1	0.39
3	(Algeria) Rezki Hamroune	JS Kabylie	9	0	0.33
6	(Algeria) Rachid Nadji	MC Oran	8	2	0.33
6	(Algeria) Ismaïl Belkacemi	CS Constantine	8	0	0.33
6	(Algeria) Mohamed Tiaiba	AS Ain M'lila	8	0	0.57
9	(Burundi) Fiston Abdul Razak	JS Kabylie	7	0	0.35
9	(Algeria) Billel Bensaha	DRB Tadjenanet	7	2	0.27
9	(Algeria) Youcef Bechou	CR Belouizdad	7	0	0.3
9	(Algeria) Abderrahmane Meziane	USM Alger	7	0	0.29

Updated to games played on 26 May 2019
Source: soccerway.com

=== Hat-tricks ===
Player	For	Against	Result	Date	Ref
(Algeria) Abdelmoumene Djabou	ES Sétif*	AS Ain M'lila	4–0	30 January 2019	

=== Clean sheets ===
^{*} Only goalkeepers who played all 90 minutes of a match are taken into consideration. Updated to games played in August 2018

== Presidential elections Protests 2019 ==
Immediately after the announcement of several parties in the social networking sites on the events of Friday, February 22 against the fifth term of the current President Abdelaziz Bouteflika, LFP announced the suspension of a match between MC Alger vs MC Oran for round 22 and JSM Bejaia vs Paradou AC in the Algerian Cup. On 24 February 2019, The match between the CR Belouizdad vs DRB Tadjenanet were suspended, Which was to play on Tuesday, also has been delayed 3 games In addition, the matches USM Alger vs Paradou AC of Ligue 1 23rd day, US Biskra vs JSM Skikda and ASM Oran vs RC Relizane of Ligue 2 24th day, initially fixed for Friday 1 March are staggered to Saturday 2 March. A day later, another match was suspended in the Ligue 1 between USM Bel Abbès and JS Saoura, in Ligue 2 Also postponed another match ASO Chlef vs JSM Bejaia. To be the sixth match postponed since the beginning of the demonstrations.

== See also ==
- 2018–19 Algerian Ligue Professionnelle 2
- 2018–19 Algerian Cup
