= Ismaïla Diarra =

Malian footballer (born 1992)

Personal information
- Date of birth: 16 January 1992 (age 34)
- Place of birth: Kéniéba, Mali
- Position: Striker

Team information
- Current team: CA Bordj Bou Arréridj
- Number: 14

Senior career*
Years	Team	Apps	(Gls)
20xx–2013	CO de Bamako		
2013	Al-Ismaily		
2013–2014	CO de Bamako		
2014–2015	Azam F.C.		
2015–2016	Chabab Atlas Khénifra		
2016	Rayon Sports F.C.		
2016–2017	Daring Club Motema Pembe		
2017–2018	Rayon Sports F.C.		
2018–	CA Bordj Bou Arréridj		

International career
2012	Mali	2	(0)
- * Club domestic league appearances and goals

Ismaïla Diarra (born 16 January 1992 in Kéniéba, Mali) is a Malian professional footballer who is currently assigned to CA Bordj Bou Arréridj of the Algerian Ligue Professionnelle 1.

== Career ==
=== Rwanda ===
Going to Rayon Sports of the Rwanda National Football League on a six-month contract in February 2016, Diarra renewed his contract with Gikundiro in summer that year after finding the net three times in a 4-0 routing of Bugesera in the domestic league. He then severed ties with Rayon by October before returning to the club in mid-2017.

=== Kenya ===
Poised to move to AFC Leopards of the Kenyan Premier League in summer 2016, the Malian striker was said to have signed an official deal with the club and was even registered by the Football Kenya Federation but Rayon Sports were obdurate that he was still their player and had not been officially released. AFC Leopards proceeded to bring the case to FIFA.
