= Charlton Mashumba =

Zimbabwean footballer (born 1992)

Personal information
- Date of birth: 12 December 1992 (age 33)
- Place of birth: Zimbabwe
- Position: Striker

Senior career*
Years	Team	Apps	(Gls)
2012–2013	Blackburn Rovers	18	(9)
2014–2016	Jomo Cosmos	65	(31)
2016–2018	Highlands Park	30	(4)
2018	USM Alger	0	(0)
2018	Jomo Cosmos	8	(4)
2019–2021	Polokwane City	49	(9)
2021–2022	Sekhukhune United	9	(0)
2022–2023	JDR Stars	6	(0)
2023–2024	Al-Lewaa		

International career
	Zimbabwe U17	5	(-)
	Zimbabwe U20	2	(-)
- * Club domestic league appearances and goals as of 6 March 2019

Charlton Mashumba (born 12 December 1992) is a Zimbabwean professional footballer, currently playing.

== Career ==
Mashumba signed for Jomo Cosmos F.C. and in his first season helped them get promoted from the 2014–15 National First Division after finishing 2nd in which Mashumba scored 17 goals. Following this it was thought that Mashumba would leave the club, as his goalscoring efforts had attracted attention from other Premier League Soccer clubs, as well as those abroad. This was confirmed when Mushumba went for trials in Portugal with C.D. Tondela in the Primeira Liga in which he scored a goal in a friendly against U.D. Oliveirense. Mashumba also held trials in Switzerland These trials proved ultimately unsuccessful, and he rejoined Jomo Cosmos, signing a 2-year contract.

On 11 July 2023, Mashumba joined Saudi Second Division side Al-Lewaa.

== International career ==
Mashumba has represented Zimbabwe at international youth level, playing five times for the U17s, and twice for the U20s.
