= Mohamed Benyahia =

Algerian professional footballer (born 1992)

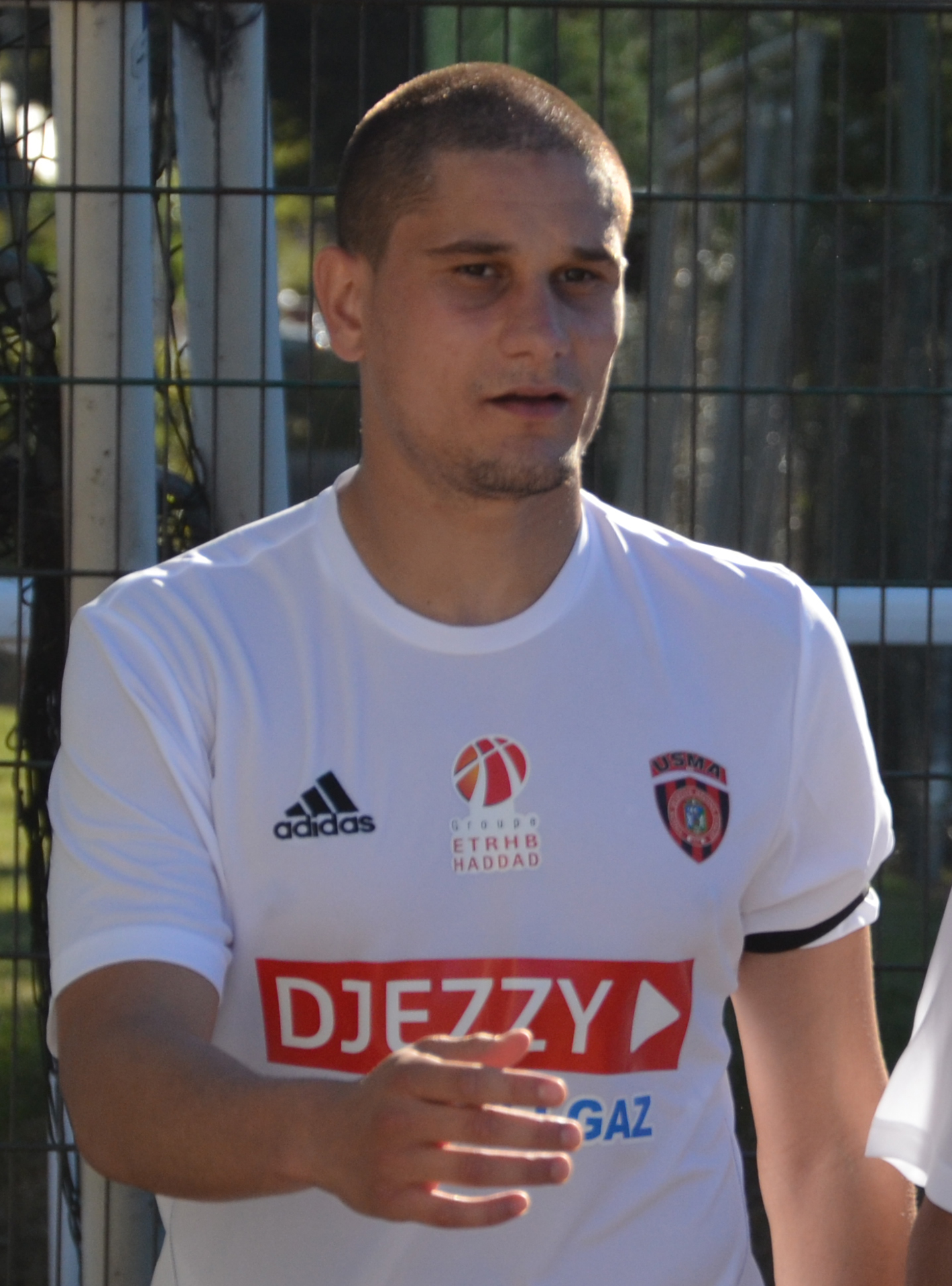
- Benyahia with USM Alger in 2016

Personal information
- Date of birth: 30 June 1992 (age 34)
- Place of birth: Tremblay-en-France, France
- Height: 1.87 m (6 ft 2 in)
- Position: Defender

Senior career*
Years	Team	Apps	(Gls)
2011–2015	Nîmes	23	(1)
2014–2015	→ CA Bastia (loan)	27	(11)
2015–2016	MC Oran	24	(9)
2016–2019	USM Alger	63	(4)
2020–2021	ES Sétif	0	(0)
2021–2022	JSM Skikda		
2022	Al-Thoqbah		
2022–2023	Al-Suqoor		

International career
2009	Algeria U17	2	(0)
- * Club domestic league appearances and goals as of 00:00, 26 May 2019 (EST)

Mohamed Benyahia (born 30 June 1992) is a professional footballer who plays as a defender. Born in France, he has represented internationally at youth level.

== Club career ==
In June 2015, Benyahia signed a two-year contract with USM Alger.

On 21 August 2022, Benyahia joined Saudi Arabian club Al-Suqoor.

== International career ==
In 2009, Benyahia was a member of the Algerian Under-17 National Team that finished second at the 2009 African U-17 Championship.

== Honours ==
USM Alger

- Algerian Ligue Professionnelle 1: 2018–19
- Algerian Super Cup: 2016
