= Vivien Assie =

Ivorian footballer

Vivien Assie Koua
Personal information
- Full name: Vivien Assie Koua
- Date of birth: 30 December 1992 (age 33)
- Place of birth: Ivory Coast
- Height: 1.86 m (6 ft 1 in)
- Position: Defender

Team information
- Current team: Al-Ahli
- Number: 25

Youth career
- AS Denguélé

Senior career*
Years	Team	Apps	(Gls)
	AS Denguélé	–	(–)
	CO Transports	–	(–)
	Stade Tunisien	–	(–)
2012–2016	Al-Kharaitiyat	51	(0)
2016–2018	Al Arabi	13	(0)
2019	MC Oran	19	(2)
2020	Kazma	–	(–)
2020–2021	AS Vita Club	0	(0)
2021–2022	CS Chebba		
2022–2023	Al-Madina		
2023–	Al-Ahli		
- * Club domestic league appearances and goals as of 9 December 2020

Vivien Assie Koua (Arabic: فيفيان آسي كوا; born 30 December 1992) is an Ivorian footballer who plays for Jordanian Pro League club Al-Ahli.
