= Redouane Cherifi =

Algerian footballer (born 1993)

Personal information
- Date of birth: 22 February 1993 (age 33)
- Place of birth: Beni Messous, Algeria
- Height: 1.80 m (5 ft 11 in)
- Position: Left back

Team information
- Current team: JSM Béjaïa
- Number: 17

Senior career*
Years	Team	Apps	(Gls)
2012–2013	JSM Chéraga		
2013–2014	CA Batna	22	(0)
2014–2017	USM Bel-Abbès	71	(0)
2017–2020	USM Alger	64	(1)
2020–2021	Ismaily	3	(0)
2021–2022	Olympique Béja	0	(0)
2022–2023	NC Magra	8	(0)
2024	WA Boufarik	0	(0)
2024–	JSM Béjaïa	0	(0)

International career^{‡}
2014–2016	Algeria U23	14	(1)
2019–	Algeria	1	(0)
- * Club domestic league appearances and goals as of 15 August 2023 ‡ National team caps and goals as of 9 November 2019

Redouane Cherifi (Arabic: رضوان شريفي; born 22 February 1993) is an Algerian footballer who plays as a defender for JSM Béjaïa.

== Career ==
Cherifi started his career playing for JSM Chéraga, then he joined CA Batna, USM Bel-Abbès and USM Alger. In October 2020, he transferred to Egyptian club Ismaily.

In 2022, he joined NC Magra.

== Honours ==
=== Club ===
USM Alger

- Algerian Ligue Professionnelle 1 (1): 2018–19
