= Oualid Ardji =

Algerian footballer (born 1995)

Personal information
- Full name: Oualid Ardji
- Date of birth: September 7, 1995 (age 31)
- Place of birth: Zéralda, Algeria
- Height: 1.70 m (5 ft 7 in)
- Position: Winger

Team information
- Current team: US Biskra
- Number: 9

Youth career
- USM Alger

Senior career*
Years	Team	Apps	(Gls)
2015–2020	USM Alger	52	(1)
2016–2018	→ NA Hussein Dey (loan)	32	(2)
2021–2022	NA Hussein Dey	18	(2)
2022–2024	CS Constantine	47	(6)
2024–2025	MC Oran	19	(2)
2025	RC Kouba		
2025–	US Biskra	5	(0)
- * Club domestic league appearances and goals as of 13 November 2025

Oualid Ardji (Arabic: وليد عرجي; born September 7, 1995) is an Algeria footballer who plays as an attacking midfielder for US Biskra.

== Career ==
In July 2016, Ardji joined NA Hussein Dey. In December 2017, he returned to USM Alger. In 2021, Ardji returned to NA Hussein Dey. In 2022, he joined CS Constantine. On 4 February 2024, Ardji joined MC Oran.

== Honours ==
=== Club ===
USM Alger

- Algerian Ligue Professionnelle 1 (1): 2018–19
