= Thierry Froger =

French footballer (born 1963)

Personal information
- Date of birth: 21 March 1963 (age 63)
- Place of birth: Le Mans, France
- Height: 1.83 m (6 ft 0 in)
- Position: Defender

Team information
- Current team: APR FC (head coach)

Youth career
- 1971–1978: Le Mans

Senior career*
Years	Team	Apps	(Gls)
1978–1986	Lille		
1986–1987	Grenoble		
1987–1991	Le Mans		

Managerial career
- 1994–1997: Le Mans
- 1997–1998: Lille
- 1998–2003: Châteauroux
- 2003–2004: Gueugnon
- 2005–2008: Reims
- 2010–2011: Togo
- 2011–2012: Nîmes
- 2012–2014: Vannes
- 2015: Créteil
- 2017: TP Mazembe
- 2018–2019: USM Alger
- 2020–2021: USM Alger
- 2022–2023: Arta/Solar7
- 2023–: APR FC
- * Club domestic league appearances and goals

Thierry Froger (born 21 March 1963) is a French football coach and former player who is the head coach of APR FC.

== Playing career ==
Froger played club football for Le Mans, Lille and Grenoble.

== Coaching career ==
In January 2013, Froger replaced Stéphane Le Mignan at the head of the Vannes Olympique Club in National. Upon taking office, he failed in his attempt to bring the club back to Ligue 2 before finishing 17th the following season. Following this relegation, the club filed for bankruptcy and he left office. He bounced back at the Créteil-Lusitanos on 7 January 2015, taking over from resigned Philippe Hinschberger with the goal of keeping the club in Ligue 24. The club finished the season in 14th place with 45 points. After a good start to the 2015–16 season, the club was fourth at the end of the 9th round, he went on to have 7 defeats in 9 games including an elimination in the 7th round of the Coupe de France. On 4 December, Froger was laid off. On 5 December 2020 USMA agreed with former club coach Thierry Froger to lead him for one season after a consultation with Yahia and some lead players.

At the beginning of the 2021–22 Djibouti Premier League season, Froger was hired by AS Arta/Solar7 as head coach. Led by Froger, the team won the Premier League and the Djibouti Cup in 2022.

Froger was appointed head coach of Rwandan club APR FC in July 2023, having agreed a one-year contract.

== Managerial statistics ==
As of 15 August 2022

Team	Nat	From	To	Record				
Team	Nat	From	To	P	W	D	L	Win %
Le Mans FC	(France)	1 January 1994	30 June 1997	158	54	62	42	34.18
LOSC Lille	(France)	1 July 1997	15 September 1998	52	19	17	16	36.54
LB Châteauroux	(France)	16 September 1999	30 June 2003	169	68	49	52	40.24
FC Gueugnon	(France)	23 February 2004	30 June 2005	53	17	18	18	32.08
Stade Reims	(France)	1 July 2005	30 June 2007	128	41	37	50	32.03
Togo	(Togo)	14 June 2010	2 March 2011	8	0	3	5	0.00
Nîmes Olympique	(France)	2 March 2011	25 May 2012	54	21	19	14	38.89
Vannes OC	(France)	29 December 2012	5 January 2015	59	16	22	21	27.12
US Créteil	(France)	7 January 2015	7 December 2015	39	12	10	17	30.77
TP Mazembe	(Democratic Republic of the Congo)	15 February 2017	21 March 2017	5	2	2	1	40.00
USM Alger	(Algeria)	19 June 2018	14 March 2019	37	20	7	10	54.05
USM Alger	(Algeria)	5 December 2020	7 March 2021	12	6	1	5	50.00
Arta/Solar7	(Djibouti)	31 January 2022	15 November 2022	20	13	5	2	65.00
Career total				794	289	252	253	36.40
