= 2013–14 JS Kabylie season =

JS Kabylie
2013–14 season
- Chairman: Mohand Chérif Hannachi
- Head coach: Azzedine Aït Djoudi
- Stadium: Stade du 1er Novembre 1954
- Ligue 1: Runners-up
- Algerian Cup: Runners-up
- Top goalscorer: League: Albert Ebossé Bodjongo (17); All: Albert Ebossé Bodjongo (23)

In the 2013–14 season, JS Kabylie competed in the Ligue 1 for the 43rd season, as well as the Algerian Cup.

== Competitions ==
=== Overview ===
Competition	Record								Started round	Final position / round	First match	Last match
Competition	G	W	D	L	GF	GA	GD	Win %	Started round	Final position / round	First match	Last match
Ligue 1	30	15	9	6	39	21	+18	50.00	—N/a	Runners-up	24 August 2013	24 May 2014
Algerian Cup	6	4	2	0	9	2	+7	66.67	Round of 64	Runners-up	7 December 2013	1 May 2014
Total	36	19	11	6	48	23	+25	52.78				

Updated to match played 9 May 2017
Source: Competitions

== League table ==
Pos	Team	Pld	W	D	L	GF	GA	GD	Pts	Qualification or relegation
1	USM Alger (C)	30	20	8	2	49	21	+28	68	Qualification for the Champions League preliminary round
2	JS Kabylie (Note: JS Kabylie, the 2013–14 Algerian Ligue Professionnelle 1 runner-up, was suspended by the CAF for two years due to the death of Albert Ebossé during their league home match against USM Alger. On 11 February 2015, the CAS overturned the suspension. However, their replacement MC El Eulma continued to represent Algeria in the 2015 CAF Champions League.)	30	15	9	6	39	21	+18	54	
3	ES Sétif	30	15	8	7	40	27	+13	53	Qualification for the Champions League first round
4	MC El Eulma	30	13	9	8	38	28	+10	48	Qualification for the Champions League preliminary round
5	USM El Harrach (Note: USM El Harrach would have qualified for the CAF Confederation Cup preliminary round by finishing fourth in the 2013–14 Algerian Ligue Professionnelle 1, but due to the penalty imposed on them by CAF after their withdrawal from the 2014 CAF Champions League, they could not participate.)	30	13	8	9	34	27	+7	47	

Updated to match(es) played on 22 May 2014. Source: DZFoot
Rules for classification: 1) points; 2) head-to-head points; 3) head-to-head goal difference; 4) goal difference; 5) total goals; 6) fairplay ranking; 7) playoff.
(C) Champions

=== Results summary ===
Overall								Home						Away					
Pld	W	D	L	GF	GA	GD	Pts	W	D	L	GF	GA	GD	W	D	L	GF	GA	GD
30	15	9	6	39	21	+18	54	11	3	1	22	4	+18	4	6	5	17	17	0

Last updated: 29 December 2014.
Source: Competitive matches

=== Results by round ===
Round	1	2	3	4	5	6	7	8	9	10	11	12	13	14	15	16	17	18	19	20	21	22	23	24	25	26	27	28	29	30
Ground	A	H	A	H	A	H	A	H	A	H	H	A	H	A	H	H	A	H	A	H	A	H	A	H	A	A	H	A	H	A
Result	W	D	W	W	L	W	D	D	L	W	W	D	D	D	L	W	L	W	D	W	L	W	W	W	L	W	W	D	W	D
Position	3	4	2	3	4	2	2	3	5	3	2	2	4	3	4	4	5	4	5	3	4	3	3	2	3	3	3	3	2	2

Updated to match(es) played on 29 December 2014. Source: Competitive matches
A = Away; H = Home; W = Win; D = Draw; L = Loss

=== Matches ===
24 August 2013 Round 1	MC El Eulma	3–4	JS Kabylie	El Eulma
18:00	Chenihi 17'; Remache 70' (o.g.); Hamiti 75'	Report	30', 84' Yesli; 58' Rial; 65' Ebossé Bodjongo	Stadium: Stade Messaoud Zougar; Referee: Abderrezzak Arab

31 August 2013 Round 2	JS Kabylie	0–0	USM Alger	Tizi Ouzou
17:45		Report		Stadium: Stade 1er Novembre 1954; Referee: Mehdi Abid Charef

3 September 2013 Round 3	CRB Aïn Fakroun	0–1	JS Kabylie	Aïn M'lila
17:00		Report	45' Ebossé Bodjongo	Stadium: Stade des Frères Demane Debbih; Referee: Redouane Necib

14 September 2013 Round 4	JS Kabylie	2–0	MC Oran	Tizi Ouzou
18:00	Aouedj 16'; Beziouen 90+3'	Report		Stadium: Stade 1er Novembre 1954; Referee: Said Aouina

20 September 2013 Round 5	CR Belouizdad	1–0	JS Kabylie	Algiers
16:45	Hanifi 23'	Report		Stadium: Stade 20 Août 1955; Referee: Mohamed Bichari

28 September 2013 Round 6	JS Kabylie	1–0	JSM Béjaïa	Tizi Ouzou
16:45	Ebossé Bodjongo 33'	Report		Stadium: Stade 1er Novembre 1954; Referee: Mustapha Ghorbal

5 October 2013 Round 7	ASO Chlef	1–1	JS Kabylie	Chlef
18:00	A. Farhi 90+5'	Report	14' Madi	Stadium: Stade Mohamed Boumezrag; Referee: Mokhtar Amalou

19 October 2013 Round 8	JS Kabylie	1–1	ES Sétif	Tizi Ouzou
17:45	Ebossé Bodjongo 90'	Report	74' (o.g.) Remache	Stadium: Stade du 1er Novembre 1954; Referee: Farouk Houasnia

26 October 2013 Round 9	MC Alger	1–0	JS Kabylie	Algiers
17:45	Yahia-Chérif 25'	Report		Stadium: Stade Omar Hamadi; Referee: Djamel Haimoudi

2 November 2013 Round 10	JS Kabylie	1–0	RC Arbaâ	Tizi Ouzou
17:00	Chibane 43'	Report		Stadium: Stade du 1er Novembre 1954; Referee: Rafik Achouri

9 November 2013 Round 11	JS Kabylie	2–0	CA Bordj Bou Arréridj	Tizi Ouzou
16:00	Ebossé Bodjongo 71', 80'	Report		Stadium: Stade du 1er Novembre 1954; Referee: Mohamed Sahraoui

23 November 2013 Round 12	USM El Harrach	0–0	JS Kabylie	Algiers
15:00		Report		Stadium: Stade 1er Novembre 1954; Referee: Mehdi Abid Charef

30 November 2013 Round 13	JS Kabylie	0–0	MO Béjaïa	Tizi Ouzou
15:00		Report		Stadium: Stade du 1er Novembre 1954; Referee: Merzak Halalchi

14 December 2013 Round 14	JS Saoura	1–1	JS Kabylie	Béchar
15:00	Sebie 40'	Report	12' Sedkaoui	Stadium: Stade 20 Août 1955; Referee: Boubekeur Zouaoui

27 December 2013 Round 15	JS Kabylie	1–2	CS Constantine	Tizi Ouzou
16:45	Beziouen 79'	Report	85' Maïza; 90+6' (pen.) Boulemdaïs	Stadium: Stade du 1er Novembre 1954; Referee: Mohamed Benouza

18 January 2014 Round 16	JS Kabylie	2–0	MC El Eulma	Tizi Ouzou
16:00	Zubya 15'; Ebossé Bodjongo 47'	Report		Stadium: Stade du 1er Novembre 1954; Referee: Mohamed Ghorbal

1 February 2014 Round 17	USM Alger	3–2	JS Kabylie	Algiers
17:45	Meftah 30' (pen.); Ziaya 59', 73'	Report	5', 90' (pen.) Rial	Stadium: Stade Omar Hamadi; Referee: Mokhtar Amalou

8 February 2014 Round 18	JS Kabylie	1–0	CRB Aïn Fakroun	Tizi Ouzou
15:00	Rial 90+2' (pen.)	Report		Stadium: Stade du 1er Novembre 1954; Referee: Said Aouina

14 February 2014 Round 19	MC Oran	0–0	JS Kabylie	Oran
15:00		Report		Stadium: Ahmed Zabana Stadium; Referee: Mehdi Abid Charef

22 February 2014 Round 20	JS Kabylie	3–1	CR Belouizdad	Tizi Ouzou
15:00	Ebossé Bodjongo 15'; Benlamri 38', 55'	Report	53' M. Dahmane	Stadium: Stade du 1er Novembre 1954; Referee: Mohamed Benouza

1 March 2014 Round 21	JSM Béjaïa	2–1	JS Kabylie	Béjaïa
17:00	Niati 24'; Chalali 90+3'	Report	38' Aouedj	Stadium: Stade de l'Unité Maghrébine; Referee: Redouane Necib

8 March 2014 Round 22	JS Kabylie	1–0	ASO Chlef	Tizi Ouzou
15:00	Ebossé Bodjongo 86' (pen.)	Report		Stadium: Stade du 1er Novembre 1954; Referee: Mustapha Ghorbal

15 March 2014 Round 23	ES Sétif	0–2	JS Kabylie	Sétif
17:45		Report	10' Ebossé Bodjongo; 77' Raiah	Stadium: Stade 8 Mai 1945; Referee: Mohamed Bichari

22 March 2014 Round 24	JS Kabylie	3–0	MC Alger	Tizi Ouzou
15:00	Rial 31'; Bencherifa 45'; Ebossé Bodjongo 83' (pen.)	Report		Stadium: Stade du 1er Novembre 1954; Referee: Mohamed Saïdi

25 April 2014 Round 25	RC Arbaâ	4–3	JS Kabylie	Larbaâ
15:00	Amiri 4'; Mokdad 16'; Bougueroua 24'; E. Lazaref 72'	Report	60', 90+1' Ebossé Bodjongo; 66' Mekkaoui	Stadium: Stade Ismaïl Makhlouf; Referee: Boubekeur Zouaoui

6 May 2014 Round 26	CA Bordj Bou Arréridj	0–1	JS Kabylie	Bordj Bou Arréridj
18:00		Report	37' Zubya	Stadium: Stade 20 Août 1955; Referee: Abderrezzak Arab

10 May 2014 Round 27	JS Kabylie	2–0	USM El Harrach	Tizi Ouzou
17:00	Ebossé Bodjongo 51', 53' (pen.)	Report		Stadium: Stade du 1er Novembre 1954; Attendance: 0 (close doors); Referee: Mohamed Amine Bachir

13 May 2014 Round 28	MO Béjaïa	1–1	JS Kabylie	Béjaïa
17:00	Z. Nemdil 90'	Report	34' Zubya	Stadium: Stade de l'Unité Maghrébine; Referee: Lyés Bekouassa

17 May 2014 Round 29	JS Kabylie	2–0	JS Saoura	Tizi Ouzou
17:00	Ebossé Bodjongo 6', 32' (pen.)	Report		Stadium: Stade du 1er Novembre 1954; Referee: Redouane Necib

24 May 2014 Round 30	CS Constantine	0–0	JS Kabylie	Constantine
17:00		Report		Stadium: Stade Mohamed Hamlaoui; Referee: Djamel Haimoudi

== Algerian Cup ==
6 December 2013 Round of 64	JS Kabylie	4–0	NRB El Kala	Tizi Ouzou
16:00	Ferguène 30', 89'; Yesli 49'; Ebossé Bodjongo 90'			Stadium: Stade 1er Novembre 1954

21 December 2013 Round of 32	USM Alger	0–0 (2–3 p)	JS Kabylie	Algiers
17:00				Stadium: Stade Omar Hamadi; Attendance: 20.000; Referee: Haïmoudi, Itchiali et Benmansour

25 January 2014 Round of 16	MC Saïda	0–1	JS Kabylie	Saïda
15:00			Kamel Yesli 11'	Stadium: Stade 13 Avril 1958; Referee: Abid Charef, Tamen, Zid

18 February 2014 Quarter-final	JS Kabylie	1–0	MC Oran	Tizi Ouzou
15:00	Madi 80'			Stadium: Stade 1er Novembre 1954; Attendance: 15.000; Referee: Zouaoui, Bitam, F. Aouina

28 March 2014 Semi-final	JS Kabylie	2–1 (a.e.t.)	CRB Aïn Fakroun	Tizi Ouzou
16:00	Ali Rial 97'; Albert Ebossé Bodjongo 117'		Daïra 106'	Stadium: Stade 1er Novembre 1954; Attendance: 15.000; Referee: Abid Charef, Bitam, Tamen

1 May 2014 Final	JS Kabylie	1–1 (4 – 5 p)	MC Alger	Blida
16:00	Rial 88' (pen.)	Repport	4' (o.g.) Rial	Stadium: Stade Mustapha Tchaker; Attendance: 35000; Referee: Mohamed Bichari
	Penalties
	Rial (penalty missed); Remache (penalty scored); Raiah (penalty scored); Ebossé (penalty scored)... (penalty scored)		(penalty scored) Yachir; (penalty scored) ... (penalty scored) Bouguèche; (penalty scored) Djeghbala; (penalty scored) Gharbi

== Squad information ==
=== Playing statistics ===
No.	Pos	Nat	Player	Total		Ligue 1		Algerian Cup	
No.	Pos	Nat	Player	Apps	Goals	Apps	Goals	Apps	Goals
31	GK	(Algeria) ALG	Malik Asselah	23	0	21	0	2	0
30	GK	(Algeria) ALG	Nabil Mazari	13	0	9	0	4	0
5	DF	(Algeria) ALG	Ali Rial	35	7	29	5	6	2
87	DF	(Algeria) ALG	Zineddine Mekkaoui	26	1	22	1	4	0
88	DF	(Algeria) ALG	Belkacem Remache	31	0	26	0	5	0
25	DF	(Algeria) ALG	Djamel Benlamri	33	2	27	2	6	0
41	DF	(Algeria) ALG	Abdelmalek Merbah	13	0	11	0	2	0
24	DF	(Algeria) ALG	Mohamed Hikem	2	0	2	0	0	0
22	DF	(Algeria) ALG	Mohamed Walid Bencherifa	27	1	21	1	6	0
11	MF	(Algeria) ALG	Farid Beziouen	27	2	22	2	5	0
	MF	(Algeria) ALG	Hamza Bencherif	7	0	6	0	1	0
6	MF	(Algeria) ALG	Kaci Sedkaoui	30	1	25	1	5	0
17	MF	(Algeria) ALG	Aymen Madi	19	2	16	1	3	1
8	MF	(Algeria) ALG	Tayeb Maroci	14	0	13	0	1	0
18	MF	(Algeria) ALG	Kamel Yesli	34	3	28	2	6	1
21	MF	(Algeria) ALG	Malik Raiah	15	1	11	1	4	0
36	MF	(Algeria) ALG	Samir Aiboud	12	0	11	0	1	0
	MF	(Algeria) ALG	Malik Ihadjadene	1	0	1	0	0	0
29	FW	(Libya) LBA	Mohamed Zubya	13	3	11	3	2	0
99	FW	(Algeria) ALG	Ahmed Messadia	23	0	21	0	2	0
15	FW	(Algeria) ALG	Saïd Ferguène	6	2	4	0	2	2
10	FW	(Algeria) ALG	Sid Ahmed Aouedj	33	2	27	2	6	0
	FW	(Algeria) ALG	Fayçal Belakhdar	6	0	5	0	1	0
7	FW	(Algeria) ALG	Yacine Si Salem	7	0	5	0	2	0
	FW	(Algeria) ALG	Youcef Chibane	16	1	14	1	2	0
9	FW	(Cameroon) CMR	Albert Ebossé Bodjongo	36	19	30	17	6	2
Players transferred out during the season

Last updated: 9 October 2017
Source: fr.soccerway.com

=== Goalscorers ===
Includes all competitive matches. The list is sorted alphabetically by surname when total goals are equal.

No.	Nat.	Player	Pos.	L 1	AC	TOTAL
9	(Cameroon)	Albert Ebossé Bodjongo	FW	17	6	23
5	(Algeria)	Ali Rial	DF	5	2	7
18	(Algeria)	Kamel Yesli	MF	2	2	4
29	(Libya)	Mohamed Zubya	FW	3	0	3
25	(Algeria)	Djamel Benlamri	DF	2	0	2
11	(Algeria)	Farid Beziouen	MF	2	0	2
17	(Algeria)	Aymen Madi	MF	1	1	2
15	(Algeria)	Saïd Ferguène	FW	0	2	2
10	(Algeria)	Sid Ahmed Aouedj	FW	2	0	2
87	(Algeria)	Zineddine Mekkaoui	DF	1	0	1
22	(Algeria)	Mohamed Walid Bencherifa	DF	1	0	1
6	(Algeria)	Kaci Sedkaoui	MF	1	0	1
21	(Algeria)	Malik Raiah	MF	1	0	1
	(Algeria)	Youcef Chibane	FW	1	0	1
Own Goals				0	0	0
Totals				39	13	52

== Transfers ==
=== In ===
Date	Pos	Player	From club	Transfer fee	Source
26 May 2013	MF	(Algeria) Aymen Madi	NA Hussein Dey	Undisclosed	
1 July 2013	GK	(Algeria) Mohamed Amara	Reserve team	First Professional Contract	
1 July 2013	MF	(Algeria) Sid Ahmed Aouedj	MC Oran	Undisclosed	
1 July 2013	MF	(Algeria) Malik Ihadjadene	Reserve team	First Professional Contract	
2 July 2013	MF	(Cameroon) Albert Ebossé Bodjongo	(Malaysia) Perak FA	Undisclosed	
9 July 2013	MF	(France) (Algeria) Kamel Yesli	(France) Paris FC	Free transfer	
14 July 2013	DF	(Algeria) Abdelmalek Merbah	JS Saoura	Free transfer	
19 July 2013	MF	(France) (Algeria) Farid Beziouen	(France) Sedan	Free transfer	
15 December 2013	FW	(Libya) Mohamed Zubya	Unattached	Free transfer	
16 December 2013	MF	(Algeria) Yacine Si Salem	RC Arbaâ	Undisclosed	
1 January 2014	MF	(Algeria) Samir Aiboud	Reserve team	First Professional Contract	
4 January 2014	MF	(Algeria) Hamza Bencherif	(England) Plymouth Argyle	Free transfer	

=== Out ===
Date	Pos	Player	To club	Transfer fee	Source
21 June 2013	DF	(Algeria) Essaïd Belkalem	(Italy) Udinese	Undisclosed	
3 July 2013	FW	(Algeria) Djamel Bouaïcha	MC Oran	Free transfer	
