= 2014 Algerian Cup final =

2013 Algerian Cup final
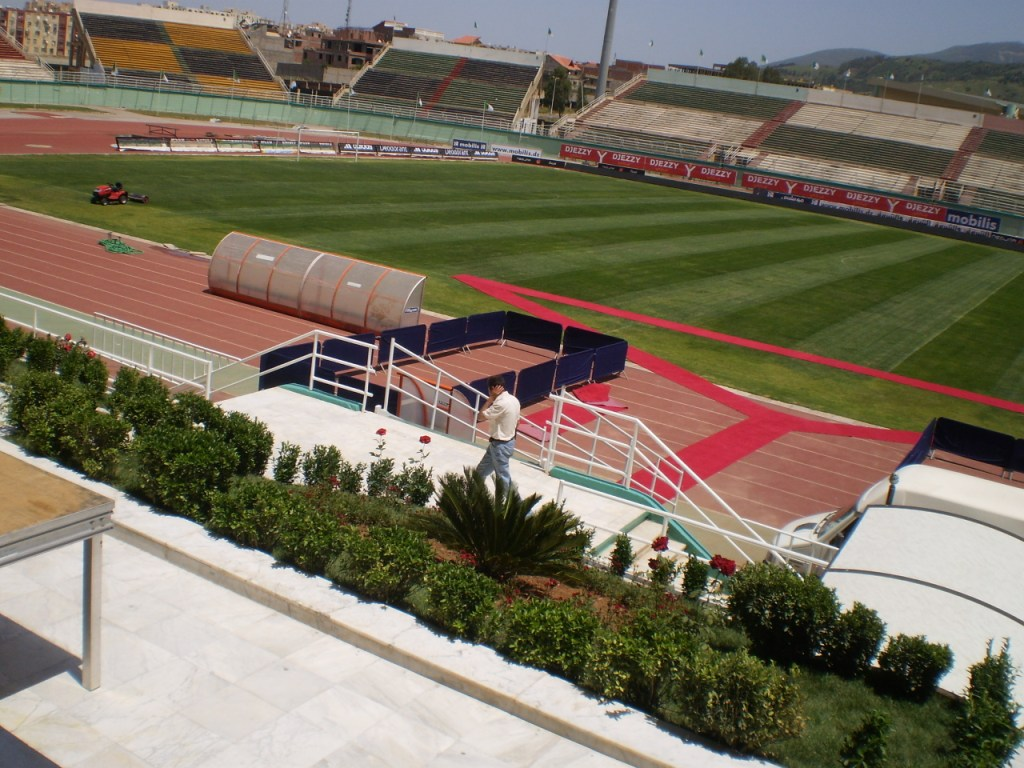
- Mustapha Tchaker Stadium hosted the match
- Event: 2013–14 Algerian Cup
MC Alger	JS Kabylie
1	1
- MC Alger won 5–4 on penalties
- Date: May 1, 2014
- Venue: stade Mustapha Tchaker, Blida
- Referee: Mohamed Bichari
- Attendance: 35.000

The 2014 Algerian Cup final was the 50th final of the Algerian Cup. The final took place on May 1, 2014, at stade Mustapha Tchaker in Blida with kick-off at 16:00. MC Alger beat JS Kabylie 5–4 on penalties, to win their seventh Algerian Cup.

Algerian Ligue Professionnelle 1 clubs MC Alger and JS Kabylie will contest the final, in what will be the 100th edition of the Algerien Classico. The competition winners are awarded a berth in the 2015 CAF Confederation Cup.

== Pre-match ==
MC Alger were appearing in an Algerian Cup final for an eighth time. They had won the cup six times previously (in 1971, 1973, 1976, 1983, 2006, 2007) and had lost in the last final 2013, JS Kabylie were appearing in a final a tenth time and had won the cup Five times previously (in 1977, 1986, 1992, 1994, 2011).

=== Details ===
May 1, 2014
16:00

JS Kabylie	1–1	MC Alger
Ali Rial 88' (pen.)	Report (in French)	4' (o.g.) Ali Rial
Penalties
Ali Rial (penalty missed); Belkacem Remache (penalty scored); Malik Raiah (penalty scored); Albert Ebossé Bodjongo (penalty scored) (penalty scored)	4–5	(penalty scored) Ali Sami Yachir (penalty scored); (penalty scored) Hadj Bouguèche; (penalty scored) Abdelmalek Djeghbala; (penalty scored) Sabri Gharbi

stade Mustapha Tchaker, Blida
Attendance: 35.000
Referee: Mohamed Bichari

JS Kabylie	MC Alger

GK	30	(Algeria) Malik Asselah
DF	2	(Algeria) Belkacem Remache
DF	25	(Algeria) Djameleddine Benlamri
DF	87	(Algeria) Zineddine Mekkaoui
DF	5	(Algeria) Ali Rial
MF	22	(Algeria) Mohamed Walid Bencherifa
MF	11	(Algeria) Farid Beziouen
MF	6	(Algeria) Kaci Sedkaoui		(substituted off) 58'
MF	8	(Algeria) Tayeb Maroci		(substituted off) 46'
MF	18	(Algeria) Kamel Yesli		(substituted off) 74'
FW	9	(Cameroon) Albert Ebossé Bodjongo	(yellow card) 39'
Substitutes:
MF	21	(Algeria) Malik Raiah		(substituted on) 46'
MF	10	(Algeria) Sid Ahmed Aouedj		(substituted on) 58'
FW	-	(Libya) Mohammad Za'abia		(substituted on) 74'
Manager:
(Algeria) Azzedine Ait Djoudi

GK	12	(Algeria) Houari Djemili
DF	4	(Algeria) Amine Aksas
DF	27	(Algeria) Abderahmane Hachoud
DF	3	(Algeria) Toufik Zeghdane
MF	6	(Algeria) Karim Ghazi	(yellow card) 84'
MF	18	(Algeria) Antar Boucherit	(yellow card) 53'
DF	30	(Algeria) Abdelmalek Djeghbala	(yellow card) 88'
MF	10	(Algeria) Billal Ouali		(substituted off) 90'
FW	99	(Algeria) Hadj Bouguèche
FW	7	(Algeria) Sid Ali Yahia-Chérif		(substituted off) 61'
FW	17	(Algeria) Moustapha Djallit	(yellow card) 42'	(substituted off) 84'
Substitutes:
MF	26	(Algeria) Sabri Gharbi		(substituted on) 61'
FW	21	(Algeria) Ali Sami Yachir		(substituted on) 84'
MF	23	(Algeria) Hocine Metref		(substituted on) 90'
Manager:
(Algeria) Fouad Bouali

MATCH OFFICIALS

- Assistant referees:
- Fourth official:
