= List of JS Kabylie players =

Below is a list of notable footballers who have played for JS Kabylie. Generally, this means players that have played 100 or more league matches for the club. However, some players who have played fewer matches are also included; this includes players that have had considerable success either at other clubs or at international level, as well as players who are well remembered by the supporters for particular reasons.

Players are listed in alphabetical order according to the date of their first-team official debut for the club. Appearances and goals are for first-team competitive matches only. Substitute appearances included. Statistics accurate as of 14 March 2020.

== List of JS Kabylie players ==
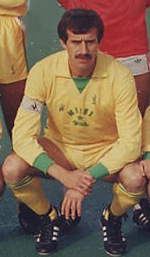
Ali Fergani.

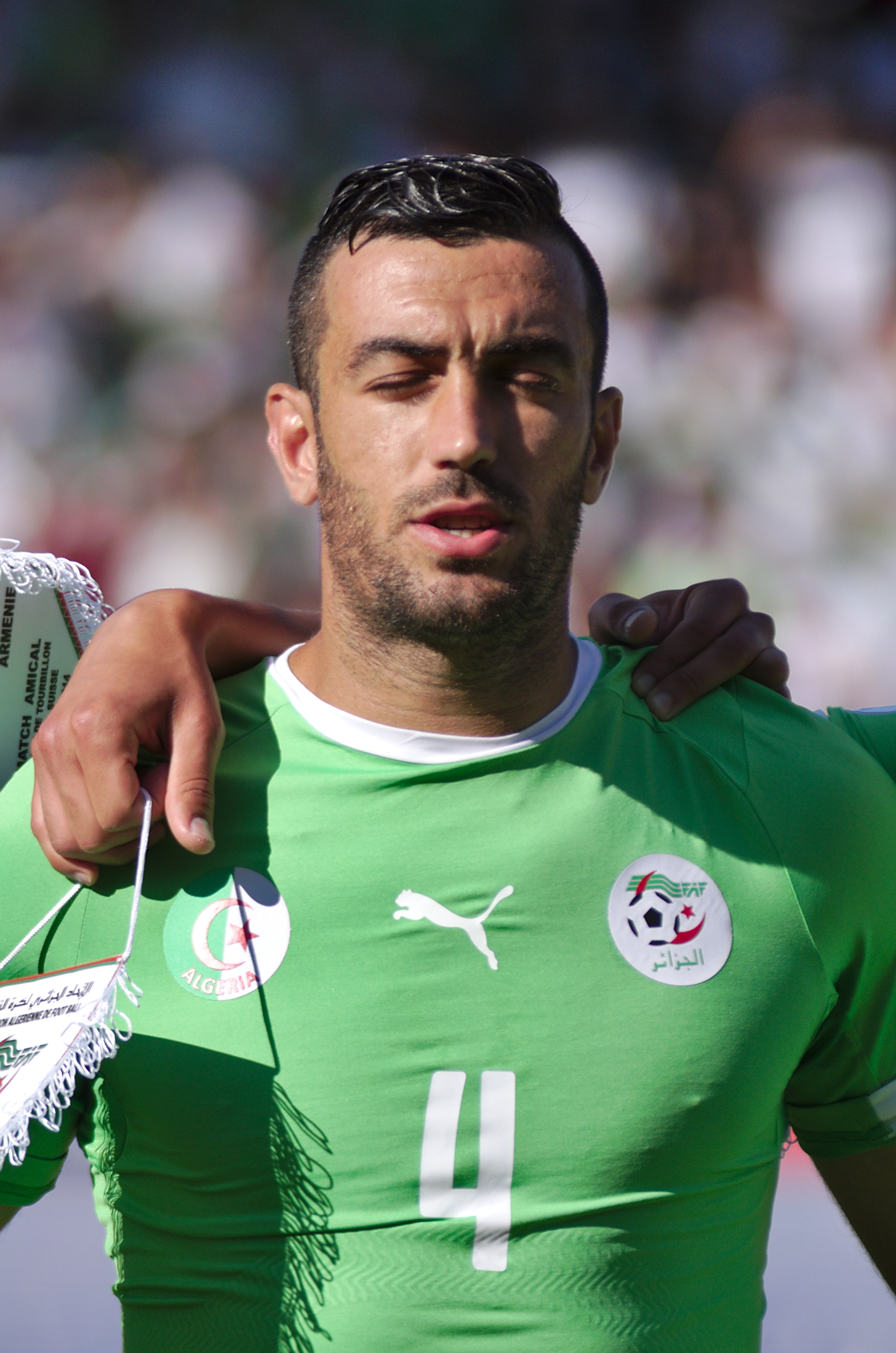
Essaïd Belkalem.

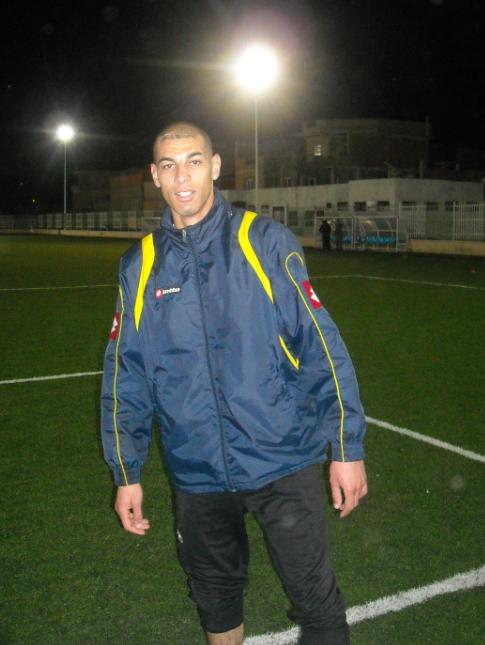
Faouzi Chaouchi.

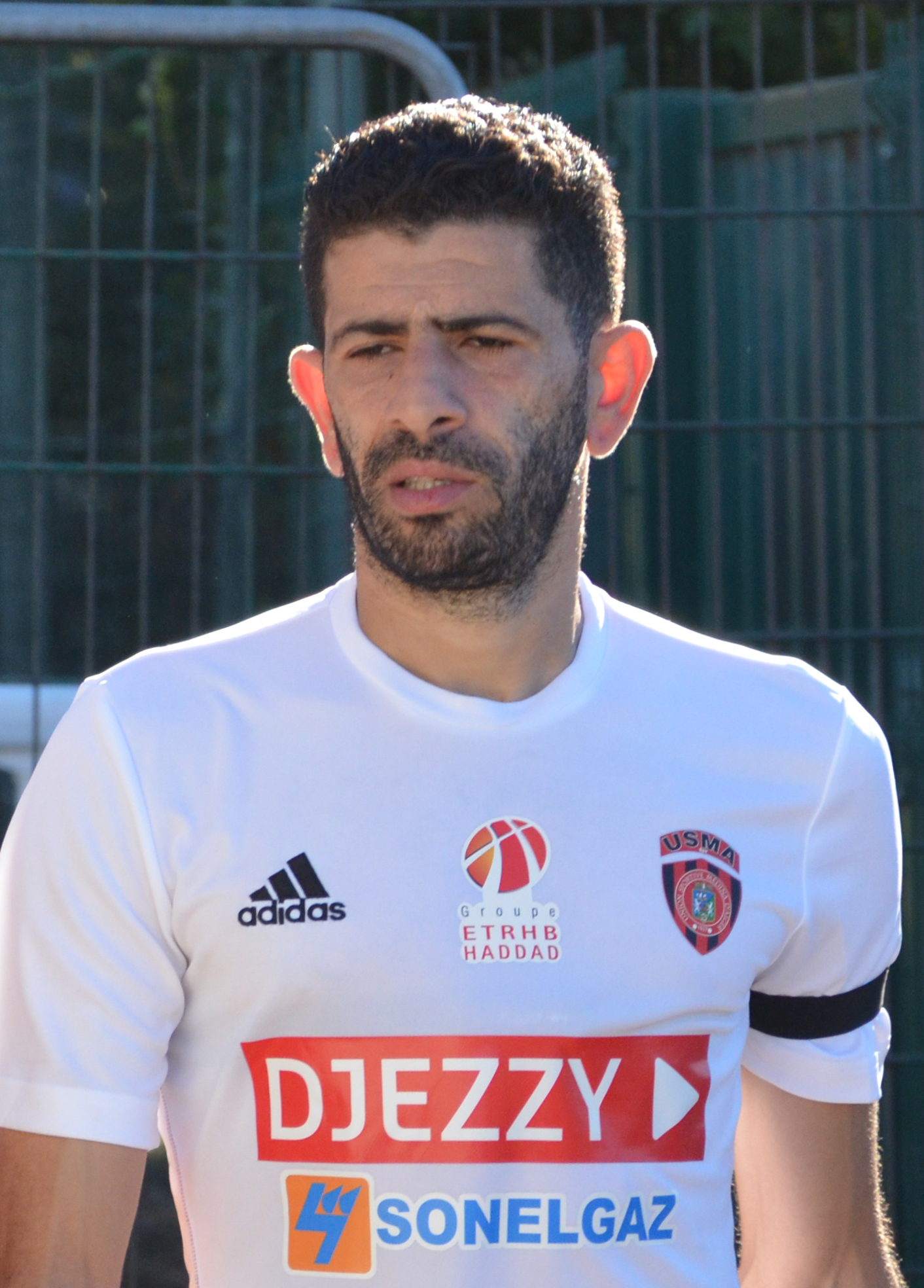
Mohamed Rabie Meftah.

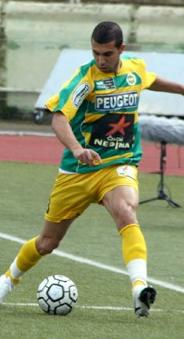
Saad Tedjar.

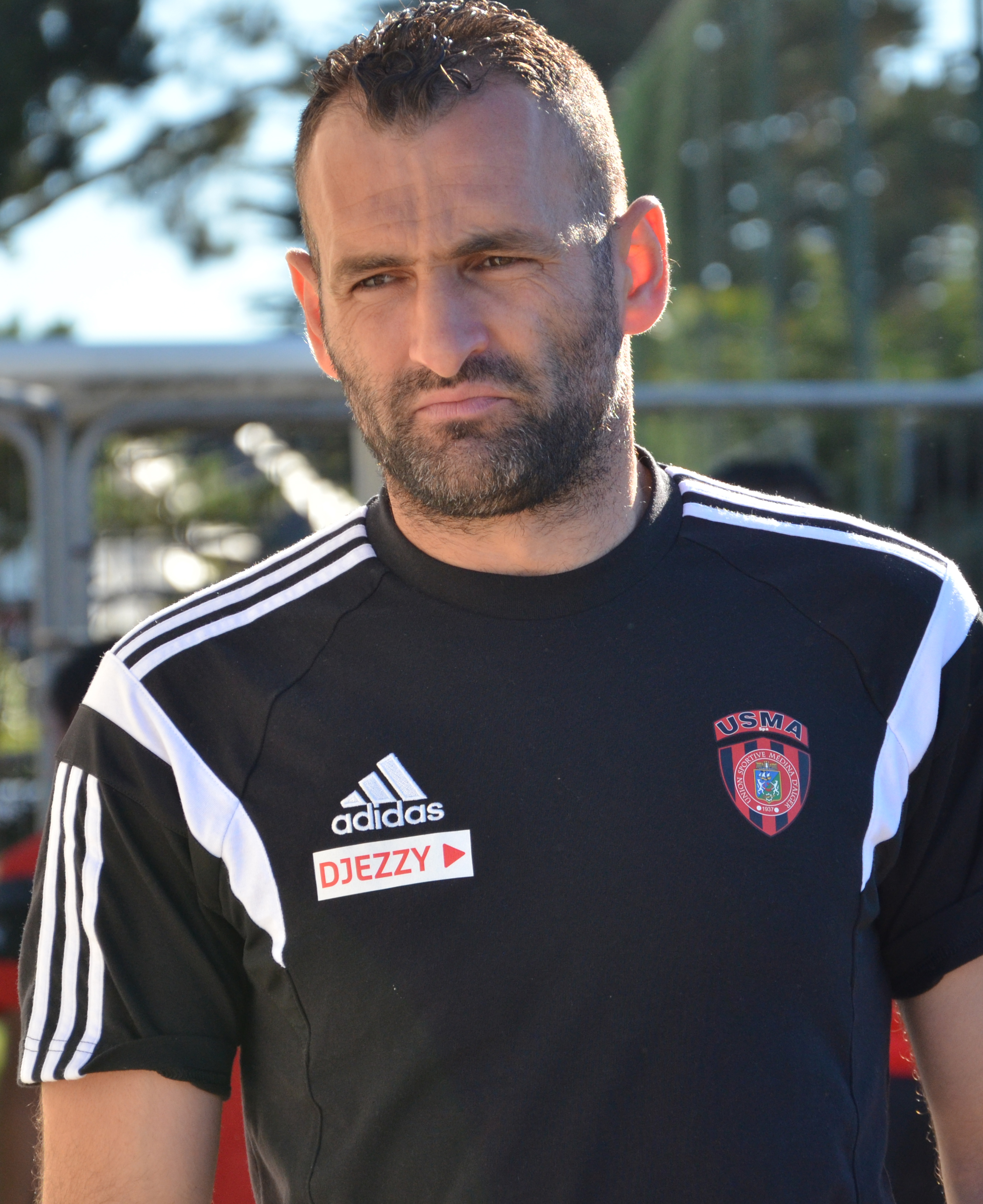
Mourad Berrefane.

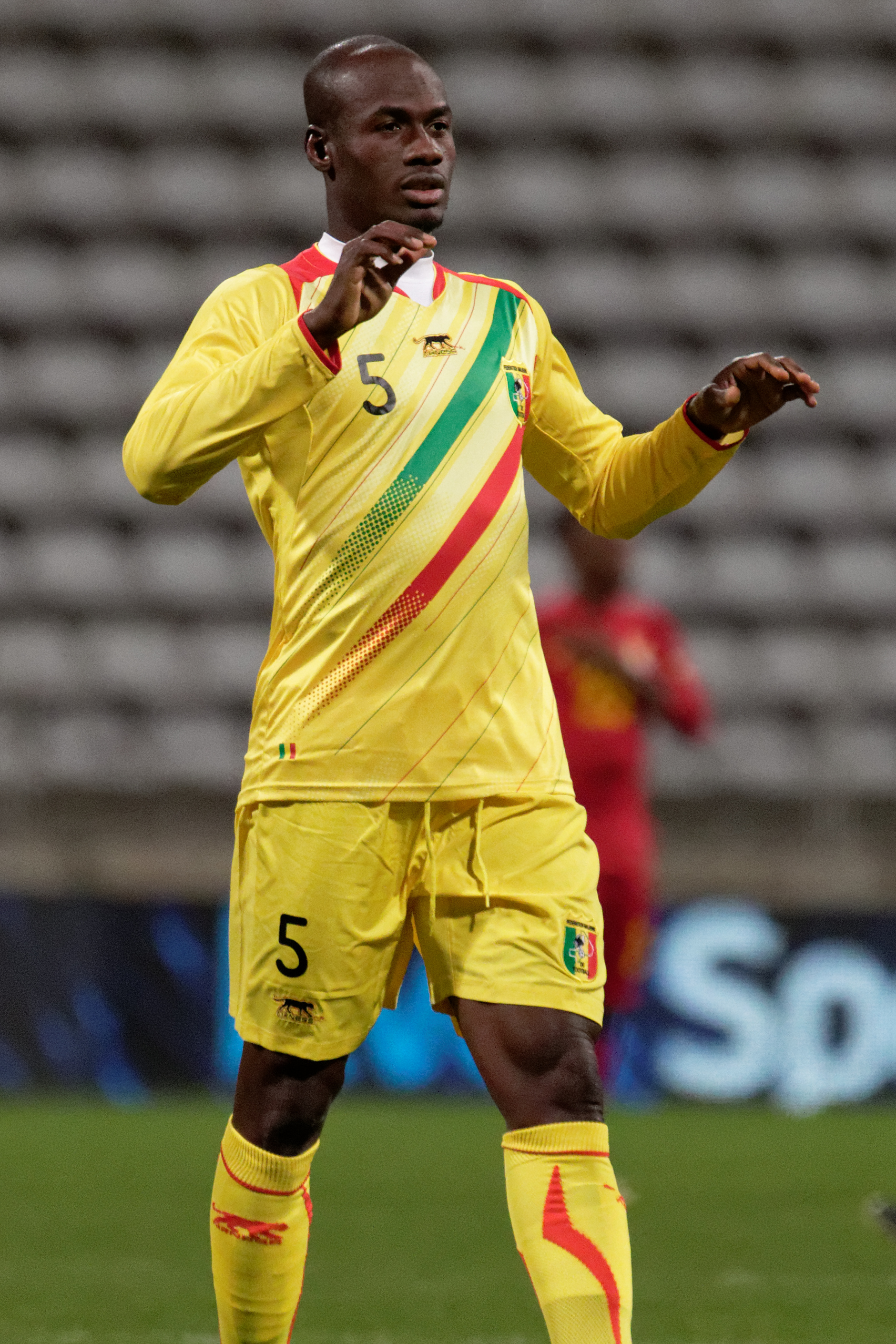
Idrissa Coulibaly.

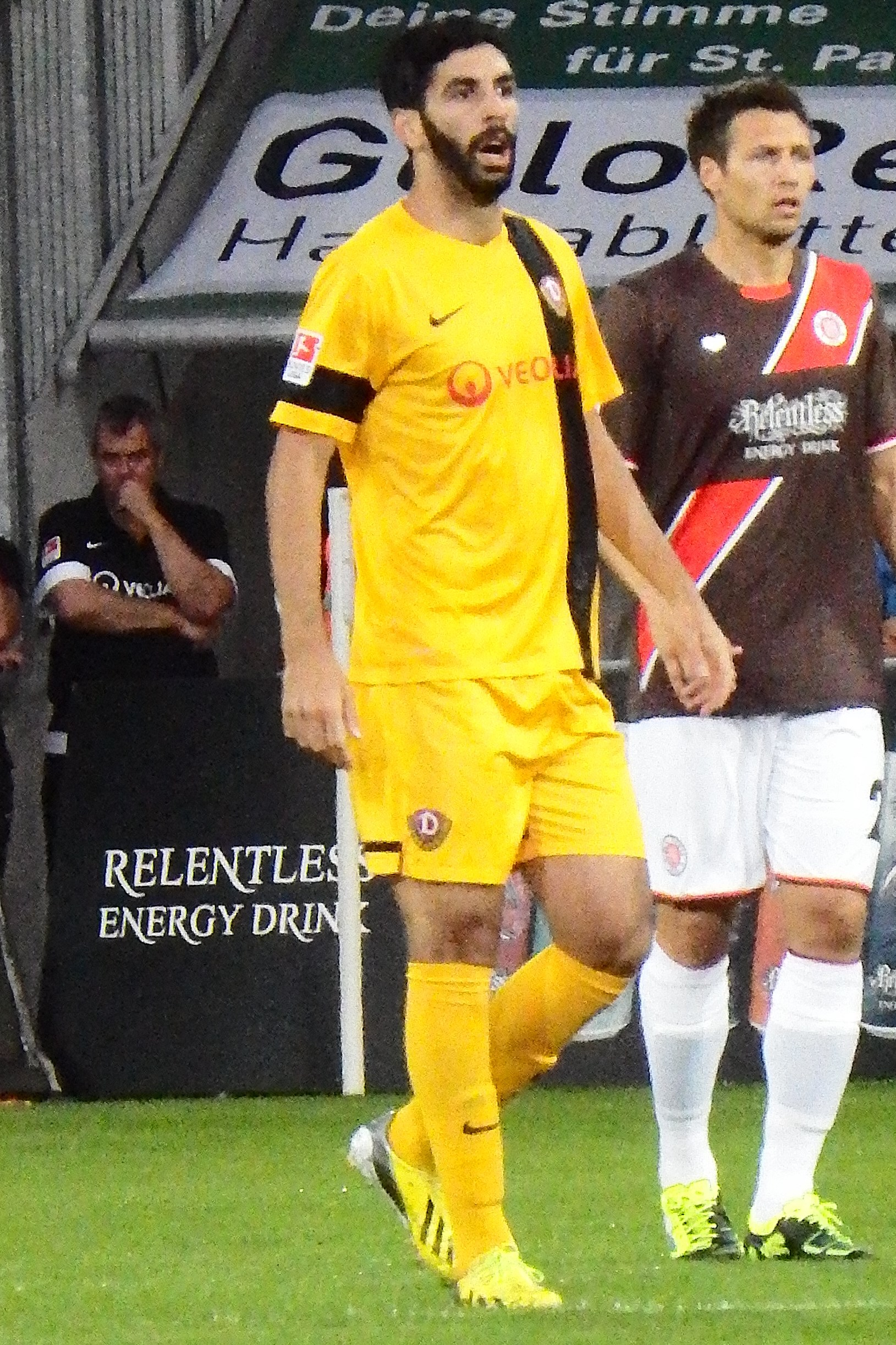
Mohamed Amine Aoudia.

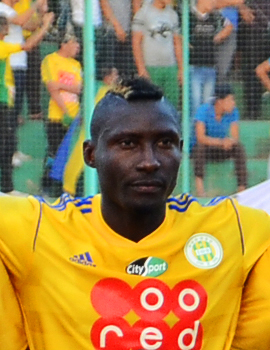
Albert Ebossé Bodjongo.

Name	Nat.	Position	Inter career	Appearances	Goals	Notes
Lounès Gaouaoui	(Algeria)	GK	1995–2006	?	?	
Liamine Bougherara	(Algeria)	GK	1998–2003	?	?	
Brahim Zafour	(Algeria)	DF	1996–2005, 2006–08	?	?	
Slimane Raho	(Algeria)	DF	1998–2006	?	?	
Noureddine Drioueche	(Algeria)	DF	1998–2003, 2004–07	?	?	
Abdelaziz Benhamlat	(Algeria)	DF	1991–03, 2004–05	?	?	
Rezki Amrouche	(Algeria)	DF	1994–97, 2000–01	?	?	
Lounés Bendahmane	(Algeria)	MF	2000–05	?	?	
Mohamed Reda Abaci	(Algeria)	MF	2000–02	?	?	
Farouk Belkaïd	(Algeria)	MF	1998–2005	?	?	
Mohamed Meghraoui	(Algeria)	MF	1997–2003	?	?	
Fawzi Moussouni	(Algeria)	FW	1997–2001, 2004–05	?	?	
Mounir Dob	(Algeria)	FW	2000–03	96	30	
Hakim Medane	(Algeria)	MF	1988–91, 1996–2000	?	?	
Djamel Menad	(Algeria)	FW	1981–87, 1994–96	?	?	
Tarek Hadj Adlane	(Algeria)	FW	1991–96	167	77	
Ali Fergani	(Algeria)	MF	1979–87	?	?	
Abdelhamid Sadmi	(Algeria)	DF	1978–94	?	?	
Nacer Bouiche	(Algeria)	FW	1983–90	?	?	
Moussa Saïb	(Algeria)	MF	1989–92, 2003–04	?	?	
Mourad Amara	(Algeria)	GK	1977–92	?	?	
Wilfried Urbain Elvis Endzanga	(Republic of the Congo)	FW	2003–05	43	15	
Wassiou Oladipupo	(Benin)	MF	2005–08	42	1	
Hamza Yacef	(Algeria)	FW	2005–07	53	9	
Yacine Bezzaz	(Algeria)	MF	2001–02	25	4	
Anwar Boudjakdji	(Algeria)	MF	2004–06	63	7	
Mehdi Cerbah	(Algeria)	GK	1972–80	?	?	
Rachid Adghigh	(Algeria)	DF	1980–92	?	?	
Mouloud Iboud	(Algeria)	DF	1970–84	?	?	
Omar Hamenad	(Algeria)	GK	1986–97	?	?	
Abderrazak Djahnit	(Algeria)	FW	1989–91	?	?	
Mourad Rahmouni	(Algeria)	DF	1984–92, 1993–99	?	?	
Chérif Abdeslam	(Algeria)	MF	2006–09	73	0	
Hocine Achiou	(Algeria)	MF	2009	18	3	
Omar Daoud	(Libya)	DF	2005–07	25	0	
Salah Larbès	(Algeria)	DF	1971–87	?	?	
Kamel Aouis	(Algeria)	FW	1972–85	?	?	
Farid Ghazi	(Algeria)	FW	1997–99, 2003	37	25	
Hamid Berguiga	(Algeria)	FW	2001–06	152	65	
Nabil Hemani	(Algeria)	FW	2005–08, 2011–12	130	39	
Samir Zazou	(Algeria)	DF	2004–06	52	0	
Nabil Mazari	(Algeria)	GK	2003–15	43	0	
Mourad Berrefane	(Algeria)	GK	2003–11	35	0	
Chemseddine Nessakh	(Algeria)	DF	2009–12	86	10	
Koceila Berchiche	(Algeria)	DF	2008–11, 2015–17	119	2	
Nassim Oussalah	(Algeria)	DF	2005–11	195	11	
Idrissa Coulibaly	(Mali)	DF	2007–10	99	6	
Mohamed Khoutir Ziti	(Algeria)	DF	2009–11, 2014–16	97	5	
Essaïd Belkalem	(Algeria)	DF	2008–13, 2017–18	126	5	
Farid Bellabès	(Algeria)	DF	2008–10	40	2	
Mohamed Rabie Meftah	(Algeria)	DF	2004–10	173	13	
Lyes Boukria	(Algeria)	DF	2008–09	25	0	
Saad Tedjar	(Algeria)	MF	2009–12	103	15	
Abdennour Chérif El-Ouazzani	(Algeria)	MF	2009–11	47	0	
Ibrahim Amada	(Madagascar)	MF	2010–11	14	0	
Lamara Douicher	(Algeria)	MF	2003–11	189	1	
Lyès Saïdi	(Algeria)	MF	2007–12	51	0	
Mokhtar Lamhene	(Algeria)	MF	2007–12	44	0	
Tayeb Maroci	(Algeria)	MF	2008–10, 2012–14	86	4	
Idriss Ech-Chergui	(Algeria)	MF	2009–10	20	2	
Sid Ali Yahia-Chérif	(Algeria)	FW	2009–11	64	13	
Farès Hamiti	(Algeria)	FW	2009–11	66	21	
Mohamed Amine Aoudia	(Algeria)	FW	2009–10	45	14	
Izu Azuka	(Nigeria)	FW	2008–10	44	10	
Yassine Akkouche	(Algeria)	FW	2009–10	26	3	
Mohamed Seguer	(Algeria)	FW	2010	15	2	
Mohamed Abdelaziz Tchikou	(Algeria)	FW	2009	7	0	
Karim Braham Chaouch	(Algeria)	FW	2009	15	0	
Malik Asselah	(Algeria)	GK	2010–14, 2016–18	162	0	
Belkacem Remache	(Algeria)	DF	2010–14	132	1	
Ali Rial	(Algeria)	DF	2010–17	232	27	
Jugurtha Meftah	(Algeria)	DF	2010–12	5	0	
Hocine El Orfi	(Algeria)	MF	2010–12	65	0	
Billel Naïli	(Algeria)	MF	2010–11	35	0	
Nabil Yaâlaoui	(Algeria)	MF	2010–11	32	6	
Sofiane Younes	(Algeria)	FW	2010–11	51	3	
Abderraouf Zarabi	(Algeria)	DF	2011–12	24	0	
Nordine Assami	(Algeria)	DF	2011–12	11	0	
Abderrezak Bitam	(Algeria)	DF	2011–12	15	1	
Sofiane Khelili	(Algeria)	DF	2010–13, 2016–17	39	1	
Chaabane Meftah	(Algeria)	DF	2010–12	3	0	
Okba Hezil	(Algeria)	DF	2011–12	10	0	
Mohamed Hikem	(Algeria)	DF	2011–14	8	0	
Kaci Sedkaoui	(Algeria)	MF	2011–14	78	1	
Hocine Metref	(Algeria)	MF	2011–12	23	0	
Hamza Ziad	(Algeria)	MF	2011–13	40	0	
Madani Camara	(Ivory Coast)	MF	2011–13	57	0	
Nabil Hemani	(Algeria)	FW	2005–08	101	30	
Hamza Boulemdaïs	(Algeria)	FW	2011–12	33	6	
Salim Hanifi	(Algeria)	FW	2011–12	44	14	
Saïd Ferguène	(Algeria)	FW	2010–16	38	3	
Makan Dembélé	(Mali)	FW	2011	6	0	
Zineddine Mekkaoui	(Algeria)	DF	2012–15	66	2	
Adel Maïza	(Algeria)	DF	2013	9	2	
Djamel Benlamri	(Algeria)	DF	2012–15	90	2	
Mohamed Walid Bencherifa	(Algeria)	DF	2012–14, 2019–20	76	6	
Abdelmalek Mokdad	(Algeria)	MF	2012–13	20	4	
Said Bouchouk	(Algeria)	MF	2013	5	0	
Mohamed Chalali	(Algeria)	FW	2013	13	4	
Ahmed Messadia	(Algeria)	FW	2012–14	53	11	
Rafik Boulaïnceur	(Algeria)	FW	2013	14	0	
Djamel Bouaïcha	(Algeria)	FW	2012–13	14	2	
Faycal Belakhdar	(Algeria)	FW	2012–13	26	0	
Abdenour Hadiouche	(Algeria)	FW	2012	13	0	
Abdelmalek Merbah	(Algeria)	DF	2013–14	13	0	
Farid Beziouen	(Algeria)	MF	2013–14	27	2	
Hamza Bencherif	(Algeria)	MF	2014	9	0	
Aymen Madi	(Algeria)	MF	2013–14	19	2	
Kamel Yesli	(Algeria)	MF	2013–16	66	5	
Samir Aiboud	(Algeria)	MF	2013–17	82	4	
Mohamed Zubya	(Libya)	FW	2014	13	3	
Sid Ahmed Aouedj	(Algeria)	FW	2013–14	33	2	
Youcef Chibane	(Algeria)	FW	2013	16	1	
Albert Ebossé Bodjongo	(Cameroon)	FW	2013–14	38	21	
Abdelghani Khiat	(Algeria)	DF	2014–15	15	0	
Youcef Benamara	(Algeria)	DF	2014–15	26	0	
Mourad Delhoum	(Algeria)	MF	2014	10	0	
Azzedine Doukha	(Algeria)	GK	2014–16	62	0	
Ahmed Mekehout	(Algeria)	MF	2014–15	14	0	
Rachid Ferrahi	(Algeria)	MF	2014–16	54	2	
Hamza Yadroudj	(Algeria)	MF	2014–15	11	2	
Cheikh Moulaye Ahmed	(Mauritania)	MF	2014	18	1	
Ibrahim Si Ammar	(Algeria)	MF	2014–15	24	3	
Oussama Abdeldjelil	(Algeria)	FW	2015	13	0	
Abderrahmane Boultif	(Algeria)	GK	2016–18	27	0	
Lamine Medjkane	(Algeria)	DF	2015–17	34	1	
Patrick Malo	(Burkina Faso)	DF	2015–16	27	1	
Houari Ferhani	(Algeria)	DF	2016–18	73	1	
Faouzi Rahal	(Algeria)	MF	2015–16	24	0	
Hocine Harrouche	(Algeria)	MF	2016	12	0	
Salim Boumechra	(Algeria)	FW	2015	15	0	
Mohamed Boulaouidet	(Algeria)	FW	2015–17	65	24	
Banou Diawara	(Burkina Faso)	FW	2015–16	28	11	
Saâdi Radouani	(Algeria)	DF	2016–18	69	3	
Nabil Saâdou	(Algeria)	DF	2017–20	88	3	
Mehdi Benaldjia	(Algeria)	MF	2017–18	64	13	
Ilyes Chetti	(Algeria)	MF	2017–19	48	2	
Nassim Yettou	(Algeria)	MF	2016–18	72	8	
Adel Djerrar	(Algeria)	MF	2016–18	48	1	
Salim Boukhenchouche	(Algeria)	MF	2017–18	36	2	
Abdelkader Salhi	(Algeria)	GK	2018–19	34	0	
Fiston Abdul Razak	(Burundi)	FW	2018–19	22	7	
Uche Nwofor	(Nigeria)	FW	2018–19	20	4	
Faouzi Chaouchi	(Algeria)	GK	2006–09	108	1	
Abdelwahid Belgherbi	(Algeria)	FW	2019–20	35	9	
Amir Belaili	(Algeria)	DF	2018–20	44	2	
Badreddine Souyad	(Algeria)	DF	2018–present	39	1	
Masoud Juma	(Kenya)	FW	2019–present	12	0	
Mohamed Tubal Abdussalam	(Libya)	FW	2019–present	4	1	
Oussama Darragi	(Tunisia)	FW	2020–present	6	0	
Malik Raiah	(Algeria)	MF	2011–18, 2019–present	142	2	
Rédha Bensayah	(Algeria)	MF	2019–present	34	6	
Rezki Hamroune	(Algeria)	MF	2018–present	59	15	
Hamza Banouh	(Algeria)	FW	2019–present	23	7	
Mohamed Benchaira	(Algeria)	MF	2019–present	39	0	
Abdessamed Bounoua	(Algeria)	MF	2019–present	24	1	
Juba Oukaci	(Algeria)	MF	2014–present	59	2	

Nationalities are indicated by the corresponding FIFA country code.

== List of All-time appearances ==
This List of All-time appearances for JS Kabylie contains football players who have played for JS Kabylie and have managed to accrue 100 or more appearances.

Bold Still playing competitive football in JS Kabylie. (Note: Since 2000–01 season statistics of all the games. Statistics correct as of game against ES Sétif on March 14, 2020.)

== Players from JS Kabylie to Europe ==
Player	Pos	Club	League	Transfer fee	Source
(Algeria) Djamel Menad	FW	Nîmes Olympique	(France) Ligue 2	Free transfer	
(Algeria) Hakim Medane	MF	Famalicão	(Portugal) Primeira Liga	Free transfer	
(Algeria) Farid Ghazi	FW	Troyes AC	(France) Ligue 1	Undisclosed	
(Algeria) Fawzi Moussouni	FW	US Creteil	(France) Ligue 1	Undisclosed	
(Mali) Cheick Oumar Dabo	FW	Le Havre	(France) Ligue 1	€1,500,000	
(Algeria) Sid Ali Yahia-Chérif	FW	Istres	(France) Ligue 2	Undisclosed	
(Algeria) Essaïd Belkalem	DF	Udinese	(Italy) Serie A	Undisclosed	

== Award winners ==
(Whilst playing for JS Kabylie)

Algerian Footballer of the Year

- (Algeria) Moussa Saib – 2004

Top goalscorers in Algerian Ligue 1

- (Algeria) Mourad Derridj (14 goals) – 1972–73
- (Algeria) Mokrane Baïlèche (20 goals) – 1976–77
- (Algeria) Nacer Bouiche (17 goals) – 1983–84
- (Algeria) Nacer Bouiche (36 goals) – 1985–86
- (Algeria) Tarek Hadj Adlane (18 goals) – 1993–94
- (Algeria) Tarek Hadj Adlane (23 goals) – 1994–95
- (Algeria) Farid Ghazi (19 goals) – 1998–99
- (Algeria) Hamid Berguiga (18 goals) – 2004–05
- (Algeria) Hamid Berguiga (18 goals) – 2005–06
- (Mali) Cheick Oumar Dabo (17 goals) – 2006–07
- (Algeria) Nabil Hemani (16 goals) – 2007–08
- (Cameroon) Albert Ebossé Bodjongo (17 goals) – 2013–14

Algerian professional football awards Footballer of the Year

- (Algeria) Mohamed Rabie Meftah – 2008–09

Algerian professional football awards Goalkeeper of the Year

- (Algeria) Faouzi Chaouchi – 2008–09
