= 2014–15 JS Kabylie season =

JS Kabylie
2014–15 season
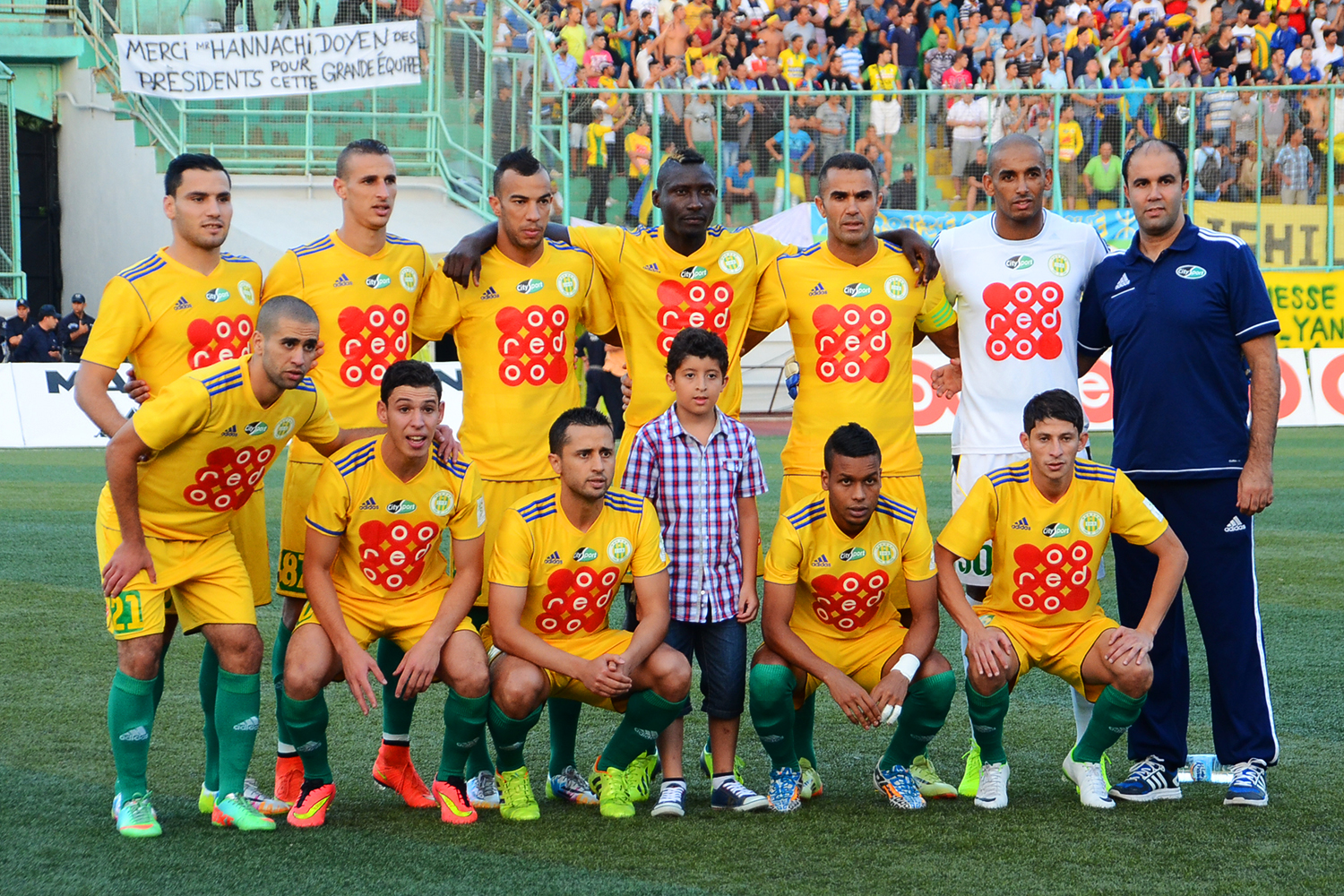
- JS Kabylie 2014–15 from Left to Right: Standing : Ziti - Mekkaoui - Benlamri - Ebossé - Rial - Doukha. Sitting Raïah - Aiboud - Delhoum - Moulay - Ferahi.
- Chairman: Mohand Chérif Hannachi
- Head coach: Jean-Guy Wallemme
- Stadium: Stade du 1er Novembre 1954
- Ligue 1: 13th
- Algerian Cup: Quarter-finals
- Top goalscorer: League: Ali Rial (12); All: Ali Rial (12)

In the 2014–15 season, JS Kabylie competed in the Ligue 1 for the 44th season, as well as the Algerian Cup.

The season was largely defined by an incident on 23 August 2014, when Albert Ebosse Bodjongo was struck on the head by a projectile thrown by an unknown person while the teams were leaving the field at the end of a home game between JSK and USM Alger. The match had ended in a 2–1 defeat, with Bodjongo contributing the sole JSK goal. Bodjongo died a few hours later in hospital of a traumatic brain injury. He was aged 24. Following Bodjongo's death, the Algerian Football Federation suspended all football indefinitely and ordered the closure of the 1st November 1954 stadium.

== Players ==
As of September 7, 2014:2015

Note: Flags indicate national team as defined under FIFA eligibility rules; some limited exceptions apply. Players may hold more than one non-FIFA nationality.

No.	Pos.	Nation	Player
1	GK	ALG	Mohamed Amara
4	DF	ALG	Zineddine Mekkaoui
5	DF	ALG	Ali Rial
9	FW	CMR	Grégoire Gael Nkama
10	MF	ALG	Samir Aiboud
13	FW	ALG	Mohamed Adis Mazari
13	MF	ALG	Malik Ihadjadène
14	FW	ALG	Mohamed Edogan
15	DF	ALG	Jugurtha Meftah
16	DF	ALG	Malik Susu Amed
16	FW	ALG	Rachid Ferrahi
20	MF	ALG	Malik Raiah
21	FW	ALG	Eder Mohamed
22	MF	ALG	Ahmed Mekehout

No.	Pos.	Nation	Player
18	MF	ALG	Kamel Yesli
23	MF	ALG	Munir Mohame Amed
24	DF	ALG	Youcef Benamara
24	MF	ALG	Adris Muhamana
25	GK	ALG	Nabil Mazari
26	DF	ALG	Djameleddine Benlamri
28	FW	ALG	Saïd Ferguène
29	FW	CMR	Raphaël Alain Kooh Sohna
30	GK	ALG	Azzedine Doukha
33	DF	ALG	Mohamed Khoutir Ziti
99	FW	ALG	Youcef Khodja
TBA	FW	ALG	Karim Boutadjine

== Competitions ==
=== Overview ===
Competition	Record								Started round	Final position / round	First match	Last match
Competition	G	W	D	L	GF	GA	GD	Win %	Started round	Final position / round	First match	Last match
Ligue 1	30	11	6	13	35	35	+0	36.67	—N/a	13th	16 August 2014	29 May 2015
Algerian Cup	4	2	1	1	7	5	+2	50.00	Round of 64	Quarter-finals	13 December 2014	10 March 2015
Total	34	13	7	14	42	40	+2	38.24				

=== Ligue 1 ===
==== League table ====
Pos	Team	Pld	W	D	L	GF	GA	GD	Pts	Qualification or relegation
11	JS Saoura	30	10	9	11	26	29	−3	39 (Note: JSS: 9 points; MCA: 6 points; JSK: 3 points)	
12	MC Alger	30	10	9	11	33	31	+2	39	
13	JS Kabylie	30	11	6	13	35	35	0	39	
14	MC El Eulma (R)	30	11	5	14	40	36	+4	38	2014–15 Algerian Ligue Professionnelle 2
15	ASO Chlef (R)	30	8	12	10	24	28	−4	36	2014–15 Algerian Ligue Professionnelle 2

Updated to match(es) played on 29 May 2015. Source: DZFoot
Rules for classification: 1) points; 2) head-to-head points; 3) head-to-head goal difference; 4) goal difference; 5) total goals; 6) fairplay ranking; 7) playoff
(R) Relegated

==== Results summary ====
Overall								Home						Away					
Pld	W	D	L	GF	GA	GD	Pts	W	D	L	GF	GA	GD	W	D	L	GF	GA	GD
30	11	6	13	33	35	−2	39	6	2	7	12	14	−2	5	4	6	21	21	0

Last updated: 29 December 2014.
Source: Competitive matches

==== Results by round ====
Round	1	2	3	4	5	6	7	8	9	10	11	12	13	14	15	16	17	18	19	20	21	22	23	24	25	26	27	28	29	30
Ground	A	H	A	H	A	H	A	H	A	H	A	A	H	A	H	H	A	H	A	H	A	H	A	H	A	H	H	A	H	A
Result	W	L	W	D	W	L	L	L	W	D	L	L	W	D	W	L	D	L	D	W	L	W	W	L	L	W	L	D	W	L
Position	3	6	3	2	2	3	6	9	4	7	9	10	9	8	6	9	9	10	12	10	12	10	8	9	10	8	10	10	9	13

Updated to match(es) played on 29 December 2014. Source: Competitive matches
A = Away; H = Home; W = Win; D = Draw; L = Loss

==== Matches ====
16 August 2014 1	MC Oran	0–2	JS Kabylie	Oran
19:00		Report	30' Ebossé; 55' Moulaye Ahmed	Stadium: Stade Ahmed Zabana; Referee: Abid Charef, Tamen, Boulfelfel

23 August 2014 2	JS Kabylie	1–2	USM Alger	Tizi Ouzou
19:00	Ebossé 27' (pen.); Mekkaoui (yellow card) 5'; Benlamari (yellow card) 44'	Report	7' (FK.) Benmoussa; 83' Belaïli; (yellow card) 11' Bouchema; (yellow card) 22' (yellow-red card) 24' Benmoussa	Stadium: Stade 1er Novembre 1954; Attendance: 20.000; Referee: Mohamed Benouza, Ayad, Oumari

13 September 2014 3	USM Bel-Abbès	0–2	JS Kabylie	Sidi Bel Abbès
19:00		Report	7' Rial; 40' Youcef Khodja	Stadium: Stade 24 Fevrier 1956; Referee: Achouri, Amri, Bougherara

20 September 2014 4	JS Kabylie	0–0	ASO Chlef	Bordj Bou Arréridj
16:00		Report		Stadium: Stade 20 Août 1955; Attendance: 0 (close doors); Referee: Necib, Meghlout, Bennacer

26 September 2014 5	NA Hussein Dey	1–2	JS Kabylie	Algiers
17:45	Deugoué 90+3'	Report	60' Aiboud; 76' Ferrahi	Stadium: Stade 20 Août 1955; Referee: Aouina, Chenaoua, Benaïssa

1 October 2014 6	JS Kabylie	0–1	JS Saoura	Algiers
17:00		Report	87' Amri	Stadium: Stade 20 Août 1955; Attendance: 0 (close doors); Referee: Boukhalfa, Benali Zerhouni

18 October 2014 7	MC El Eulma	3–2	JS Kabylie	El Eulma
18:00	Derrardja 34' (pen.), 44', 78'	Report	87', 88' Abdul-Raheem	Stadium: Stade Messaoud Zougar; Referee: Bekouassa, Bounoua, Bahloul

24 October 2014 8	JS Kabylie	0–2	ASM Oran	Algiers
16:00		Report	44', 57' Boudoumi	Stadium: Stade 20 Août 1955; Attendance: 0 (close doors); Referee: Bouchama, Bourahla, Boutaghane

30 October 2014 9	MC Alger	2–4	JS Kabylie	Algiers
18:00	Berchiche 13'; Hachoud 22'	Report	23' (pen.) Rial; 27' Yesli; 44' Ferguene; 79' Khodja	Stadium: Stade Omar Hammadi; Referee: Abid-Charef, Tamen, Boulfelfel

7 November 2014 10	JS Kabylie	1–1	ES Sétif	Algiers
17:00	Youcef Khodja 25'	Report	85' Dagoulou	Stadium: Stade 20 Août 1955; Attendance: 0 (close doors); Referee: Bassiri, Hellam, Zerhouni

21 November 2014 11	MO Béjaïa	3–1	JS Kabylie	Béjaïa
16:00	Messaoudi 9'; Yaya 23'; Hamzaoui 70'	Report	4' Youcef Khodja	Stadium: Stade de l'Unité Maghrébine; Attendance: 25.000; Referee: Bichari, Salouadji, Rachedi

29 November 2014 12	CR Belouizdad	2–1	JS Kabylie	Algiers
16:00	Bougueroua 27', 67'	Report	71' Rial	Stadium: Stade 20 Août 1955; Referee: Zouaoui, Bahatte, Benrouane

5 December 2014 13	JS Kabylie	2–1	RC Arbaâ	Algiers
17:30	Rial 35' (pen.); Si Ammar 68'	Report	38' Darfalou	Stadium: Stade Omar Hammadi; Attendance: 0 (close doors); Referee: Bachir, Abid, El-Hadj Saïd

20 December 2014 14	USM El Harrach	0–0	JS Kabylie	Algiers
14:30		Report		Stadium: Stade 1er Novembre 1954; Referee: Mial, Gourari, Salaouadji

31 December 2014 15	JS Kabylie	2–1	CS Constantine	Algiers
15:00	Ihadjadene 19'; Abdul-Raheem 84'	Report	37' Boulemdaïs	Stadium: Stade 20 Août 1955; Attendance: 0 (close doors); Referee: Ghorbal, Serradj, Cherchar

20 January 2015 16	JS Kabylie	0–1	MC Oran	Algiers
15:00		Report	25' Chérif	Stadium: Stade 1er Novembre 1954; Attendance: 0 (close doors); Referee: Boukouassa, Bounoua, Rachedi

24 January 2015 17	USM Alger	1–1	JS Kabylie	Algiers
16:00	Boudebouda 45+1'; Nadji (yellow card) 20'; Bouchema (yellow card) 50'; Meftah (yellow card) 81'; Belaïli (yellow card) 90+4'	Report	81' (pen.) Rial; (yellow card) 55' Benamara; (yellow card) 67' Benlamri	Stadium: Stade Omar Hammadi; Attendance: 10.000; Referee: Aouina, Benaïssa, Chenaoua

31 January 2015 18	JS Kabylie	0–1	USM Bel-Abbès	Algiers
16:00		Report	90+1' Ogbi Benhadouche	Stadium: Stade 20 Août 1955; Attendance: 0 (close doors); Referee: Arab, Boulfelfel, Biodh

6 February 2015 19	ASO Chlef	1–1	JS Kabylie	Chlef
16:00	Naamani 15'	Report	12' Boutadjine	Stadium: Stade Mohamed Boumezrag; Referee: Benbraham, Allaoua, Bourouba

13 February 2015 20	JS Kabylie	1–0	NA Hussein Dey	Sétif
16:00	Ziti 49'	Report		Stadium: Stade 8 Mai 1945; Attendance: 0 (close doors); Referee: Abid Charef, Tamen, Saâdi

28 February 2015 21	JS Saoura	2–1	JS Kabylie	Béchar
15:00	Aoudou 5'; Sayah 47'	Report	35' Si Ammar	Stadium: Stade 20 Août 1955; Attendance: 0 Referee: Bessiri, Tichiali, Hallam

6 March 2015 22	JS Kabylie	1–0	MC El Eulma	Tizi Ouzou
16:00	Mekkaoui 88'	Report		Stadium: Stade du 1er Novembre 1954; Attendance: 22.000; Referee: Aouina, Benaïssa, Chenaoua

21 March 2015 23	ASM Oran	2–3	JS Kabylie	Oran
17:00	Bentiba 60', 70'	Report	17' Youcef Khoudja; 52', 90' Rial	Stadium: Stade Ahmed Zabana; Attendance: 0 Referee: Zouaoui, Aouina, Kechida

28 March 2015 24	JS Kabylie	1–2	MC Alger	Tizi Ouzou
16:00	Ziti 8'	Report	26' Ben Braham; 36' Djallit	Stadium: Stade du 1er Novembre 1954; Referee: Abid-Charef, Tamen, Boufelfel

14 April 2015 25	ES Sétif	1–0	JS Kabylie	Sétif
17:00	Benyettou 66'	Report		Stadium: Stade 8 Mai 1945; Referee: Ghorbal, Seradj, Cherchar

25 April 2015 26	JS Kabylie	2–1	MO Béjaïa	Tizi Ouzou
17:00	Rial 63', 75'	Report	35' N’Diaye	Stadium: Stade du 1er Novembre 1954; Referee: Abid-Charef, Tamen, Boulfelfel

9 May 2015 27	JS Kabylie	0–1	CR Belouizdad	Tizi Ouzou
17:00		Report	44' Khelili	Stadium: Stade du 1er Novembre 1954; Referee: Bichari, Gourari, Salaouadji

16 May 2015 28	RC Arbaâ	0–0	JS Kabylie	Larbaâ
17:00		Report		Stadium: Stade Ismaïl Makhlouf; Referee: Necib, Meghlout, Bennacer

23 May 2015 29	JS Kabylie	1–0	USM El Harrach	Tizi Ouzou
17:00	Abdul-Raheem 80'	Report		Stadium: Stade du 1er Novembre 1954; Attendance: 0 Referee: Aouina, Bazine, Benaïssa

29 May 2015 30	CS Constantine	3–1	JS Kabylie	Constantine
17:00	Boulemdaïs 9', 90'; Sameur 14'	Report	21' (pen.) Rial	Stadium: Stade Mohamed Hamlaoui; Referee: Mial, Allaoua, Yahi

== Algerian Cup ==
13 December 2014 Round of 64	JS Kabylie	3–1	CRB Dar El Beida	Algiers
16:00	Yadroudj 34', 46'; Si Ammar 89'	Repport	80' Zerrouk	Stadium: Stade 20 Août 1955; Attendance: 0 Referee: Abid Charef, Atrous, Boulefelfel

27 December 2014 Round of 32	MC El Eulma	2–2 (a.e.t.) (1–4 p)	JS Kabylie	El Eulma
16:00	Bouzama 10'; Hamiti 70' (pen.)	Repport	6' Khodja; 26' Aiboud	Stadium: Stade Messaoud Zougar; Referee: Boukhalfa, Benali, Zerhouni
	Penalties
	Derrardja (penalty scored); Hamiti (penalty missed); Maïza (penalty missed)		(penalty scored) Abdul-Raheem; (penalty scored) Mekehout; (penalty scored) Ziti; (penalty scored) ?

20 February 2015 Round of 16	JS Kabylie	1–0	CS Constantine	Bologhine
16:00	Ihadjadène 9'	Repport		Stadium: Stade Omar Hammadi; Referee: Necib, Maghlout, Benacer

10 March 2015 Quarter-finals	ES Sétif	2–1	JS Kabylie	Sétif
17:00	Gasmi 41'; Dahar 46'	Repport	Ziti 8'	Stadium: Stade 8 Mai 1945; Referee: Bichari, Brahim, Salaouadji

== Squad information ==
=== Playing statistics ===
No.	Pos	Nat	Player	Total		Ligue 1		Algerian Cup	
No.	Pos	Nat	Player	Apps	Goals	Apps	Goals	Apps	Goals
25	GK	(Algeria) ALG	Nabil Mazari	5	0	5	0	0	0
30	GK	(Algeria) ALG	Azzedine Doukha	29	0	25	0	4	0
5	DF	(Algeria) ALG	Ali Rial	30	10	28	10	2	0
26	DF	(Algeria) ALG	Djamel Benlamri	30	0	26	0	4	0
	DF	(Algeria) ALG	Abdelghani Khiat	15	0	12	0	3	0
33	DF	(Algeria) ALG	Mohamed Khoutir Ziti	31	3	27	2	4	1
24	DF	(Algeria) ALG	Youcef Benamara	26	0	22	0	4	0
4	DF	(Algeria) ALG	Zineddine Mekkaoui	21	1	18	1	3	0
22	MF	(Algeria) ALG	Ahmed Mekehout	14	0	12	0	2	0
16	MF	(Algeria) ALG	Rachid Ferrahi	33	1	29	1	4	0
20	MF	(Algeria) ALG	Malik Raiah	22	0	22	0	0	0
17	MF	(Algeria) ALG	Hamza Yadroudj	11	2	8	0	3	2
10	MF	(Algeria) ALG	Samir Aiboud	27	2	23	1	4	1
18	MF	(Algeria) ALG	Kamel Yesli	26	1	24	1	2	0
7	MF	(Algeria) ALG	Ibrahim Si Ammar	24	3	20	2	4	1
29	FW	(Cameroon) CMR	Kooh Sohna	4	0	4	0	0	0
	FW	(Algeria) ALG	Juba Oukaci	1	0	0	0	1	0
9	FW	(Cameroon) CMR	Albert Ebosse Bodjongo	2	2	2	2	0	0
28	FW	(Algeria) ALG	Saïd Ferguène	19	1	18	1	1	0
	FW	(Algeria) ALG	Oussama Abdeldjelil	13	0	12	0	1	0
13	FW	(Algeria) ALG	Malik Ihadjadene	21	2	18	1	3	1
99	FW	(Algeria) ALG	Mourad Ilyes Youcef Khoudja	19	6	18	5	1	1
	FW	(Algeria) ALG	Mohand Hantat	5	0	4	0	1	0
	FW	(Algeria) ALG	Karim Boutadjine	6	1	5	1	1	0
8	FW	(Iraq) IRQ	Mohannad Abdul-Raheem	14	4	12	4	2	0
Players transferred out during the season
	MF	(Algeria) ALG	Mourad Delhoum	10	0	10	0	0	0
	MF	(Mauritania) MTN	Cheikh Moulaye Ahmed	16	1	14	1	2	0

Last updated: 15 November 2020
Source: fr.soccerway.com

=== Goalscorers ===
Includes all competitive matches. The list is sorted alphabetically by surname when total goals are equal.

No.	Nat.	Player	Pos.	L 1	AC	TOTAL
5	(Algeria)	Ali Rial	DF	12	0	12
99	(Algeria)	Youcef Khodja	FW	5	1	5
8	(Iraq)	Mohannad Abdul-Raheem	FW	4	0	4
7	(Algeria)	Ibrahim Si Ammar	MF	2	1	3
33	(Algeria)	Mohamed Khoutir Ziti	DF	2	1	3
9	(Cameroon)	Albert Ebossé	FW	2	0	2
-	(Mauritania)	Cheikh Moulaye Ahmed	FW	2	0	2
10	(Algeria)	Samir Aiboud	MF	1	1	2
17	(Algeria)	Hamza Yadroudj	MF	0	2	2
13	(Algeria)	Malik Ihadjadène	MF	1	1	2
15	(Algeria)	Saïd Ferguène	FW	1	0	1
-	(Algeria)	Karim Boutadjine	FW	1	0	1
16	(Algeria)	Rachid Ferrahi	FW	1	0	1
4	(Algeria)	Zineddine Mekkaoui	DF	1	0	1
Own Goals				0	0	0
Totals				35	7	42

== Transfers ==
=== In ===
Date	Pos	Player	From club	Transfer fee	Source
8 May 2014	FW	(Mauritania) Cheikh Moulaye Ahmed	(Mauritania) ACS Ksar	Free transfer	
14 May 2014	MF	(Algeria) Ibrahim Si Ammar	MO Constantine	Free transfer	
28 May 2014	DF	(Algeria) Youcef Benamara	USM Alger	Free transfer	
9 June 2014	GK	(Algeria) Azzedine Doukha	USM El Harrach	Free transfer	
9 June 2014	MF	(Algeria) Ahmed Mekehout	CR Belouizdad	Free transfer	
9 June 2014	FW	(Algeria) Mourad Ilyes Youcef Khoudja	US Chaouia	Free transfer	
12 June 2014	MF	(Algeria) Mourad Delhoum	ES Sétif	Free transfer	
12 June 2014	MF	(Algeria) Rachid Ferrahi	ES Sétif	Free transfer	
14 June 2014	FW	(Iraq) Mohannad Abdul-Raheem	(Iraq) Duhok	Free transfer	
1 July 2014	DF	(Algeria) Abdelghani Khiat	US Chaouia	Free transfer	
1 July 2014	DF	(Algeria) Mohamed Khoutir Ziti	ES Sétif	Free transfer	
29 December 2014	FW	(Algeria) Karim Boutadjine	(Romania) Universitatea Cluj	Free transfer	
10 January 2015	FW	(Algeria) Oussama Abdeldjelil	(France) Lyon-Duchère	Free transfer	
14 January 2015	FW	(Cameroon) Kooh Sohna	(Malta) Valletta	Free transfer	

=== Out ===
Date	Pos	Player	To club	Transfer fee	Source
4 June 2014	GK	(Algeria) Malik Asselah	CR Belouizdad	Undisclosed	
1 July 2014	DF	(Algeria) Abdelmalek Merbah	MC Oran	Free transfer	
1 July 2014	DF	(Algeria) Mohamed Walid Bencherifa	CS Constantine	Free transfer	
1 July 2014	DF	(Algeria) Belkacem Remache	CS Constantine	Free transfer	
5 July 2014	FW	(Algeria) Ahmed Messadia	CS Constantine	Free transfer	
8 January 2015	MF	(Algeria) Mourad Delhoum	ES Sétif	Undisclosed	
13 January 2015	FW	(Mauritania) Cheikh Moulaye Ahmed	CS Constantine	Free transfer	
