= 2012–13 JS Kabylie season =

JS Kabylie
2012–13 season
- Chairman: Mohand Chérif Hannachi
- Head coach: Enrico Fabbro (until 18 November 2012); Nasser Sandjak (from 20 November 2012) (until 8 April 2013); Rezki Amrouche (from 15 April 2013)
- Stadium: Stade du 1er Novembre 1954
- Ligue 1: 7th
- Algerian Cup: Round of 32
- Top goalscorer: League: Ahmed Messadia (9); All: Ahmed Messadia (11)

In the 2012–13 season, JS Kabylie competed in the Ligue 1 for the 42nd season, as well as the Algerian Cup.

== Squad list ==
Players and squad numbers last updated on 18 November 2010.
Note: Flags indicate national team as has been defined under FIFA eligibility rules. Players may hold more than one non-FIFA nationality.

No.	Nat.	Position	Name	Date of Birth (Age)	Signed from
Goalkeepers
Defenders
Midfielders
Forwards

== Competitions ==
=== Overview ===
Competition	Record								Started round	Final position / round	First match	Last match
Competition	G	W	D	L	GF	GA	GD	Win %	Started round	Final position / round	First match	Last match
Ligue 1	30	11	8	11	32	31	+1	36.67	—N/a	7th	15 September 2012	21 May 2013
Algerian Cup	2	1	1	0	3	1	+2	50.00	Round of 64	Round of 32	14 December 2012	28 December 2012
Total	32	12	9	11	35	32	+3	37.50				

Updated to match played 9 May 2017
Source: Competitions

== League table ==
Pos	Team	Pld	W	D	L	GF	GA	GD	Pts
5	MC Alger (Note: In a match between USM El Harrach and MC Alger the last refused to play in the Stade 1er Novembre 1954, but the LFP refused to change the pitch, Despite the presence of USM El Harrach, the referees and supporters, but the Mouloudia team did not attend. the club will receive a penalty, according to Article 84 of the Disciplinary Code of the Algerian Football Federation (FAF), "a match lost by penalty. Defalcation of three (03) points, One million dinars (1,000,000 dinars) fine for the club. "The offending club will be deprived of its compensation due for television rights.)	30	15	8	7	33	24	+9	50
6	CR Belouizdad	30	11	11	8	32	26	+6	44
7	JS Kabylie	30	11	8	11	32	31	+1	41
8	MC El Eulma	30	9	13	8	29	27	+2	40
9	JS Saoura	30	10	8	12	28	26	+2	38

Updated to match(es) played on 21 May 2013. Source: DZFoot
Rules for classification: 1) points; 2) head-to-head points; 3) head-to-head goal difference; 4) goal difference; 5) total goals; 6) fairplay ranking; 7) playoff.

=== Results summary ===
Overall								Home						Away					
Pld	W	D	L	GF	GA	GD	Pts	W	D	L	GF	GA	GD	W	D	L	GF	GA	GD
30	11	8	11	32	31	+1	41	8	4	3	17	8	+9	3	4	8	15	23	−8

Last updated: 29 December 2014.
Source: Competitive matches

=== Results by round ===
Round	1	2	3	4	5	6	7	8	9	10	11	12	13	14	15	16	17	18	19	20	21	22	23	24	25	26	27	28	29	30
Ground	A	H	A	H	A	H	A	H	A	H	A	A	H	A	H	H	A	H	A	H	A	H	A	H	A	H	H	A	H	A
Result	L	W	L	D	W	W	L	L	W	L	L	L	D	W	W	L	L	W	D	W	D	W	D	D	L	W	W	L	D	D
Position	13	8	11	11	8	6	7	11	7	9	10	11	11	10	8	9	10	9	9	7	7	7	7	7	8	7	7	7	7	7

Source: Competitive matches
A = Away; H = Home; W = Win; D = Draw; L = Loss

=== Matches ===
10 September 2012 Round 1	USM El Harrach	1–0	JS Kabylie	Algiers
16:00	El Amali 28'	Report		Stadium: Stade 1er Novembre 1954; Referee: Mehdi Abid Charef

18 September 2012 Round 2	JS Kabylie	3–0	WA Tlemcen	Tizi Ouzou
18:00	Bencherifa 15'; Messadia 53'; Maroci 80' (pen.)	Report		Stadium: Stade du 1er Novembre 1954; Referee: Redouane Necib

22 September 2012 Round 3	JS Saoura	2–1	JS Kabylie	Béchar
16:00	Tchikou 7'; Merbah 64'	Report	55' Bencherifa	Stadium: Stade 20 Août 1955; Referee: Rafik Achouri

29 September 2012 Round 4	JS Kabylie	0–0	MC Oran	Tizi Ouzou
18:00		Report		Stadium: Stade du 1er Novembre 1954; Referee: Said Aouina

6 October 2012 Round 5	ASO Chlef	0–2	JS Kabylie	Chlef
17:45		Report	50', 58' Bouaïcha	Stadium: Stade Mohamed Boumezrag; Referee: Boubekeur Zouaoui

16 October 2012 Round 6	JS Kabylie	2–1	JSM Béjaïa	Tizi Ouzou
17:45	Rial 38'; Messadia 45+1'	Report	90+4' Mebarki	Stadium: Stade du 1er Novembre 1954; Referee: Mohamed Saïdi

30 October 2012 Round 7	USM Alger	1–0	JS Kabylie	Algiers
18:00	Chafaï 58'	Report		Stadium: Stade Omar Hamadi; Referee: Boubekeur Zouaoui

23 October 2012 Round 8	JS Kabylie	0–1	CR Belouizdad	Tizi Ouzou
18:00		Report	(90+4.) Sodje	Stadium: Stade du 1er Novembre 1954; Referee: Mehdi Abid Charef

3 November 2012 Round 9	CS Constantine	1–2	JS Kabylie	Constantine
17:45	Boulemdaïs 10'	Report	61' Rial; 84' Messadia	Stadium: Stade Mohamed Hamlaoui; Referee: Mohamed Bichari

10 November 2012 Round 10	JS Kabylie	0–1	MC Alger	Tizi Ouzou
18:00		Report	6' Yaâlaoui	Stadium: Stade du 1er Novembre 1954; Referee: Mokhtar Amalou

17 November 2012 Round 11	USM Bel-Abbès	1–0	JS Kabylie	Sidi Bel Abbès
15:00	Hamiche 63' (pen.)	Report		Stadium: Stade 24 Fevrier 1956; Referee: Farouk Houasnia

23 November 2012 Round 12	CA Bordj Bou Arreridj	1–0	JS Kabylie	Bordj Bou Arréridj
16:00	Bendahmane 35'	Report		Stadium: Stade 20 Août 1955; Referee: Mohamed Sahraoui

1 December 2012 Round 13	JS Kabylie	1–1	ES Sétif	Tizi Ouzou
18:00	Hanifi 89'	Report	68' Djahnit	Stadium: Stade du 1er Novembre 1954; Referee: Redouane Necib

8 December 2012 Round 14	MC El Eulma	0–1	JS Kabylie	El Eulma
18:00		Report	78' Bencherifa	Stadium: Stade Messaoud Zougar; Referee: Mohamed Ghorbal

12 December 2012 Round 15	JS Kabylie	1–0	CA Batna	Tizi Ouzou
15:00	Mokdad 25'	Report		Stadium: Stade du 1er Novembre 1954; Referee: Mohamed Bachir

15 January 2013 Round 16	JS Kabylie	0–1	USM El Harrach	Tizi Ouzou
15:00		Report	37' Tatem	Stadium: Stade 1er Novembre 1954; Referee: Redouane Necib

19 January 2013 Round 17	WA Tlemcen	3–1	JS Kabylie	Tlemcen
15:00	Zouak 6'; Benai 22'; Ghazali 85'	Report	88' (pen.) Mokdad	Stadium: Stade Akid Lotfi; Referee: Farouk Houasnia

26 January 2013 Round 18	JS Kabylie	2–0	JS Saoura	Tizi Ouzou
15:00	Chalali 23'; Maïza 73'	Report		Stadium: Stade 1er Novembre 1954; Referee: Mehdi Abid Charef

2 February 2013 Round 19	MC Oran	1–1	JS Kabylie	Oran
18:00	Achiou 40'	Report	45' Maïza	Stadium: Ahmed Zabana Stadium; Referee: Boubekeur Zouaoui

9 February 2013 Round 20	JS Kabylie	1–0	ASO Chlef	Tizi Ouzou
15:00	Chalali 50'	Report		Stadium: Stade du 1er Novembre 1954; Referee: Mohamed Saïdi

19 February 2013 Round 21	JSM Béjaïa	2–2	JS Kabylie	Béjaïa
15:00	Mebarki 32'; Zeghli 48'	Report	41' Belkalem; 45' Messadia	Stadium: Stade de l'Unité Maghrébine; Attendance: 0 (close doors); Referee: Mohamed Ghorbal

23 February 2013 Round 22	JS Kabylie	1–0	USM Alger	Tizi Ouzou
15:00	Belkalem 45'	Report		Stadium: Stade 1er Novembre 1954; Referee: Rafik Achouri

9 March 2013 Round 23	CR Belouizdad	1–1	JS Kabylie	Belouizdad
15:00	Benaldjia 29'	Report	38' Mokdad	Stadium: Stade 20 Août 1955; Referee: Farouk Houasnia

19 March 2013 Round 24	JS Kabylie	1–1	CS Constantine	Tizi Ouzou
15:00	Chalali 26'	Report	59' Boulahia	Stadium: Stade 1er Novembre 1954; Referee: Mohamed Ghorbal

6 April 2013 Round 25	MC Alger	3–1	JS Kabylie	Algiers
18:00	Djallit 33' (pen.); Yachir 50', 81'	Report	59' (pen.) Rial	Stadium: Stade Omar Hamadi; Referee: Redouane Necib

19 April 2013 Round 26	JS Kabylie	2–1	USM Bel-Abbès	Tizi Ouzou
15:00	Maroci 2'; Chalali 52'	Report	89' W. Belguerfi	Stadium: Stade 1er Novembre 1954; Referee: Abderrezzak Arab

4 May 2013 Round 27	JS Kabylie	2–0	CA Bordj Bou Arreridj	Tizi Ouzou
16:00	Mokdad 56'; Messadia 70'	Report		Stadium: Stade 1er Novembre 1954; Referee: Youssef Zerrouki

11 May 2013 Round 28	ES Sétif	4–1	JS Kabylie	Sétif
17:00	El Okbi 12', 78'; Benlamri 33' (o.g.); Djahnit 59'	Report	33' Messadia	Stadium: Stade 8 Mai 1945; Referee: Merzak Halalchi

18 May 2013 Round 29	JS Kabylie	1–1	MC El Eulma	Tizi Ouzou
17:00	Messadia 81'	Report	4' Benettayeb	Stadium: Stade 1er Novembre 1954; Referee: Mohamed Sahraoui

21 May 2013 Round 30	CA Batna	2–2	JS Kabylie	Batna
16:00	Bitam 75'; Bendoukha 90'	Report	1', 60' Messadia	Stadium: November 1, 1954 Stadium; Referee: Boussadia

== Algerian Cup ==
14 December 2012 Round of 64	JS Kabylie	3–1 (a.e.t.)	NARB Réghaïa	Tizi Ouzou
15:00	Hanifi 34'; Messadia 92', 114'		80' Deghiche	Stadium: Stade 1er Novembre 1954; Referee: Merzak Halalchi

28 December 2012 Round of 32	MC Alger	0–0 (a.e.t.) (7–6 p)	JS Kabylie	Algiers
16:00				Stadium: Stade 5 Juillet 1962; Referee: Mokhtar Amalou
	Penalties
	Moustapha Djallit (penalty scored); Mehdi Kacem (penalty scored); Mouaouia Meklouche (penalty scored); Nabil Yaâlaoui (penalty scored); Hocine Metref (penalty missed); Bilal Ouali (penalty scored); Faouzi Chaouchi (penalty scored); Hamza Zeddam (penalty scored)		(penalty scored) Abdelmalek Mokdad; (penalty scored) Belkacem Remache; (penalty scored) Mohamed Walid Bencherifa; (penalty missed) Madani Camara; (penalty scored) Ali Rial; (penalty scored) Zineddine Mekkaoui; (penalty scored) Malik Asselah; (penalty missed) Abdenour Hadiouche

== Squad information ==
=== Playing statistics ===
No.	Pos	Nat	Player	Total		Ligue 1		Algerian Cup	
No.	Pos	Nat	Player	Apps	Goals	Apps	Goals	Apps	Goals
31	GK	(Algeria) ALG	Nabil Mazari	24	0	24	0	0	0
12	GK	(Algeria) ALG	Malik Asselah	9	0	7	0	2	0
5	DF	(Algeria) ALG	Ali Rial	28	3	26	3	2	0
87	DF	(Algeria) ALG	Zineddine Mekkaoui	20	0	18	0	2	0
88	DF	(Algeria) ALG	Belkacem Remache	29	0	27	0	2	0
4	DF	(Algeria) ALG	Adel Maïza	9	2	9	2	0	0
21	DF	(Algeria) ALG	Essaïd Belkalem	24	2	22	2	2	0
3	DF	(Algeria) ALG	Sofiane Khelili	2	0	2	0	0	0
25	DF	(Algeria) ALG	Djamel Benlamri	27	0	25	0	2	0
22	DF	(Algeria) ALG	Mohamed Walid Bencherifa	29	3	27	3	2	0
10	MF	(Algeria) ALG	Abdelmalek Mokdad	20	4	18	4	2	0
14	MF	(Algeria) ALG	Kaci Sedkaoui	22	0	21	0	1	0
15	MF	(Algeria) ALG	Hamza Ziad	19	0	17	0	2	0
8	MF	(Algeria) ALG	Tayeb Maroci	26	2	25	2	1	0
28	MF	(Ivory Coast) CIV	Madani Camara	25	0	23	0	2	0
23	MF	(Algeria) ALG	Mokhtar Amir Lamhene	2	0	2	0	0	0
20	MF	(Algeria) ALG	Said Bouchouk	5	0	5	0	0	0
	MF	(Algeria) ALG	Mehdi Ammar	1	0	1	0	0	0
17	FW	(Algeria) ALG	Salim Hanifi	13	2	12	1	1	1
11	FW	(Algeria) ALG	Mohamed Chalali	13	4	13	4	0	0
99	FW	(Algeria) ALG	Ahmed Messadia	30	11	28	9	2	2
	FW	(Algeria) ALG	Saïd Ferguène	2	0	2	0	0	0
9	FW	(Algeria) ALG	Rafik Boulanseur	14	0	14	0	0	0
18	FW	(Algeria) ALG	Djamel Bouaïcha	14	2	13	2	1	0
19	FW	(Algeria) ALG	Faycal Belakhdar	19	0	19	0	0	0
Players transferred out during the season
11	FW	(Algeria) ALG	Abdenour Hadiouche	13	0	11	0	2	0

Last updated: 23 November 2017
Source: fr.soccerway.com

=== Goalscorers ===
Includes all competitive matches. The list is sorted alphabetically by surname when total goals are equal.

No.	Nat.	Player	Pos.	L 1	AC	TOTAL
99	(Algeria)	Ahmed Messadia	FW	9	2	11
10	(Algeria)	Abdelmalek Mokdad	MF	4	0	4
11	(Algeria)	Mohamed Chalali	FW	4	0	4
5	(Algeria)	Ali Rial	DF	3	0	3
22	(Algeria)	Mohamed Walid Bencherifa	DF	3	0	3
4	(Algeria)	Adel Maïza	DF	2	0	2
21	(Algeria)	Essaïd Belkalem	DF	2	0	2
8	(Algeria)	Tayeb Maroci	MF	2	0	2
17	(Algeria)	Salim Hanifi	FW	1	1	2
18	(Algeria)	Djamel Bouaïcha	FW	2	0	2
Own Goals				0	0	0
Totals				32	3	35

== Transfers ==
=== In ===
Date	Pos	Player	From club	Transfer fee	Source
3 June 2012	DF	(Algeria) Faycal Belakhdar	MC El Eulma	Undisclosed	
2012	DF	(Algeria) Zineddine Mekkaoui	CS Constantine	Free transfer	
2012	MF	(Algeria) Tayeb Maroci	JSM Béjaïa	Free transfer	
2012	FW	(Algeria) Djamel Bouaïcha	MC El Eulma	Free transfer	
2012	DF	(Algeria) Mohamed Walid Bencherifa	RC Kouba	Free transfer	
2012	FW	(Algeria) Abdenour Hadiouche	MC Saïda	Undisclosed	
30 May 2012	MF	(Algeria) Djamel Benlamri	NA Hussein Dey	18,000,000 DA	
1 July 2012	DF	(Algeria) Mohamed Hikem	Reserve team	First Professional Contract	
19 July 2012	MF	(Algeria) (France) Abdelmalek Mokdad	(United Arab Emirates) Ittihad Kalba	Undisclosed	
1 January 2013	MF	(Algeria) Said Bouchouk	CA Batna	Undisclosed	
7 January 2013	FW	(Algeria) Rafik Boulanseur	CA Batna	Undisclosed	
13 January 2013	FW	(Algeria) Mohamed Chalali	ES Sétif	?	
14 January 2013	DF	(Algeria) Adel Maïza	USM Alger	Free transfer (Released)	

=== Out ===
Date	Pos	Player	To club	Transfer fee	Source
28 May 2012	MF	(Algeria) Saad Tedjar	USM Alger	Free transfer	
28 May 2012	MF	(Algeria) Hocine El Orfi	USM Alger	Free transfer	
1 July 2012	DF	(Algeria) Chemseddine Nessakh	ASO Chlef	Undisclosed	
13 January 2013	MF	(Algeria) Salim Hanifi	USM Alger	Free transfer	
7 January 2013	FW	(Algeria) Abdenour Hadiouche	CS Constantine	Free transfer	
