= List of JS Kabylie seasons =

Jeunesse Sportive de Kabylie is an Algerian professional football club based in Tizi Ouzou, Kabylia. The club was founded in 1946 as Jeunesse Sportive de Kabylie, and played its first competitive match the same year, joining the third division of the League of Algiers during the 1946–47 season. After changing its name three times from 1974 to 1977 Jamiat Sari' Kawkabi, from 1977 to 1987 Jeunesse Électronique de Tizi-Ouzou and from 1987 to 1989 Jeunesse Sportive de Tizi-Ouzou, the Kabyle club was renamed its old name Jeunesse Sportive de Kabylie in 1989.

The club has won a total of 28 major trophies, including the national championship a record 14 times also won the Algerian Cup 5 times, the Algerian League Cup once, the Algerian Super Cup 1 time, the CAF Champions League 2 times, the now-defunct African Cup Winners' Cup 1 time, the now-defunct CAF Cup 3 times and the African Super Cup 1 time. The JSK is the only club in the elite to have never experienced relegation to the second division, since its entry in 1969.

This is a list of the seasons played by JS Kabylie from 1962 when the club first entered a league competition to the most recent seasons. The club's achievements in all major national and international competitions as well as the top scorers are listed. Top scorers in bold were also top scorers of Ligue 1. The list is separated into three parts, coinciding with the three major episodes of Algerian football:

== History ==
After independence, JS Kabylie became the best Algerian team, and among the best clubs in Africa where he has seven titles, the best coach over the club is the Polish Stefan Żywotko, who won 11 titles, including the African Cup of Champions Clubs twice in 14 years.

== Before independence ==
Below, the JS Kabylie season-by-season record before independence in the French Algeria period :

(France) FFF - season-by-season record of Jeunesse Sportive de Kabylie
Season	League of Algiers											Algiers League Cup	Coupe de France	North African Championship	North African Cup
Season	Division	Pos.	Pts	P	W	D	L	F	A	GD	Goalscorer	Algiers League Cup	Coupe de France	North African Championship	North African Cup
Jeunesse Sportive de Kabylie (JSK)
**1946-47**	TD	3	58	16	16	4	2	73	18	+55	Iratni Saïd (+11 goals)	-	-	-	-
**1947-48**	DD	3	31	14	6	5	3	29	17	+12	-	-	-	-	-
**1948-49**	DD	1	38	14	12	0	2	9	4	5	-	-	-	-	-
**1949-50**	DD	1	32	12	9	2	1	-	-	-	-	-	-	-	-
**1950-51**	PD	2	43	18	10	5	3	38	25	+13	-	-	-	-	-
**1951-52**	PD	6	32	18	5	4	9	35	33	+2	-	-	-	-	-
**1952-53**	PD	2	42	18	9	6	3	34	12	+22	-	-	-	-	-
**1953-54**	PD	2	46	18	12	4	2	38	15	+23	-	-	-	-	-
**1954-55**	PH	4	46	22	9	6	7	42	28	+14	Cherrak (7 goals)	-	-	-	-
**1955-56**	PH	11	29	17	3	4	10	26	44	-18	-	-	-	-	-
No competition is played by the muslim clubs between 1956 and 1962 by order of the FLN (Algerian War)

== After independence ==
Below, the JS Kabylie season-by-season record after independence of Algeria :

Season	League									Cup	Other	Africa		Top goalscorer(s)		Ref.
Season	Division	Pos	Pts	P	W	D	L	GF	GA	Cup	Other	Africa		Name	Goals	
1962–63	Critérium Honneur	2nd	47	18	13	3	2	50	15	Round of 64				(Algeria) Abbès	15	
1963–64	Division Honneur	8th	61	30	10	11	9	31	34	Round of 64				(Algeria) El Kolli	5	
1964–65	Division Pré-Honneur	3rd	63	26	14	9	3	58	34	Round of 64						
1965–66	Division d'Honneur	5th	65	30	12	11	7	45	32	Round of 64				(Algeria) Arezki Kouffi	7	
1966–67	Division d'Honneur	2nd	50	22	11	6	5	28	20	Round of 64						
1967–68	Nationale II	1st	59	21	18	2	1	50	11	Round of 64				(Algeria) Arezki Kouffi	25	
1968–69	National II	1st	53	22	12	7	3	39	13	Round of 32				(Algeria) Mourad Derridj & (Algeria) Arezki Kouffi	19	
1969–70	National I	6th	43	22	7	7	8	28	30	Quarter-final				(Algeria) Arezki Kouffi	12	
1970–71	National I	7th	44	22	8	6	8	30	37	Round of 16						
1971–72	National I	9th	59	30	10	9	11	38	42	Round of 64				(Algeria) Mourad Derridj	13	
1972–73	National I	**1st**	69	30	13	13	4	42	28	Quarter-final				**(Algeria) Mourad Derridj**	**15**	
1973–74	National I	**1st**	71	30	17	7	6	43	32	Semi-final	Trophée des Champions					
1974–75	National I	7th	62	30	11	10	9	39	27	Quarter-final				(Algeria) Rachid Dali	10	
1975–76	National I	3rd	69	30	16	7	7	42	23	Round of 16						
1976–77	National I	**1st**	66	26	17	6	3	57	27	**Winners**				**(Algeria) Mokrane Baïleche**	**26**	
1977–78	Division 1	2nd	61	26	13	9	4	45	24	Round of 64		Cup of Champions Clubs	Quarter-Finals			
1978–79	Division 1	2nd	60	26	13	8	5	32	16	Runners–up						
1979–80	Division 1	**1st**	73	30	15	13	2	48	22	Semi-final						
1980–81	Division 1	2nd	64	28	15	6	7	50	28	Round of 16		Cup of Champions Clubs	**Winners**			
1981–82	Division 1	**1st**	70	30	14	12	4	40	22	Round of 16	African Super Cup	Cup of Champions Clubs	First round	(Algeria) Lyes Bahbouh	11	
1982–83	Division 1	**1st**	71	30	17	7	6	37	22	Round of 16		Cup of Champions Clubs	Second round	(Algeria) Rachid Barris	11	
1983–84	Division 1	3rd	64	30	13	8	9	43	24	Semi-final		Cup of Champions Clubs	Semi-Finals	**(Algeria) Nacer Bouiche**	**17**	
1984–85	Division 1	**1st**	87	38	19	11	8	58	18	Round of 32				(Algeria) Nacer Bouiche	16	
1985–86	Division 1	**1st**	98	38	27	6	5	89	22	**Winners**		Cup of Champions Clubs	Second round	**(Algeria) Nacer Bouiche**	**46**	
1986–87	Division 1	6th	41	38	14	13	11	45	31	Round of 16				(Algeria) Nacer Bouiche	12	
1987–88	Division 1	2nd	37	34	12	13	9	31	26	Quarter-final				(Algeria) Nacer Bouiche	13	
1988–89	Division 1	**1st**	37	30	14	9	7	36	22	Quarter-final				(Algeria) Nacer Bouiche	20	
1989–90	Division 1	**1st**	39	30	17	5	8	41	16	Not played		Cup of Champions Clubs	**Winners**	(Algeria) Nacer Bouiche	13	
1990–91	Division 1	4th	34	30	14	6	10	34	23	Runners–up		Cup of Champions Clubs	Second round	(Algeria) Abderrazak Djahnit	15	
1991–92	Division 1	13th	26	30	8	10	12	26	31	**Winners**				(Algeria) Tarek Hadj Adlane	15	
1992–93	Division 1	3rd	36	30	12	12	6	36	17	Not played	**Winners**	Cup Winners' Cup	Quarter-finals	(Algeria) Tarek Hadj Adlane	14	
1993–94	Division 1	3rd	35	30	14	7	9	42	23	**Winners**				**(Algeria) Tarek Hadj Adlane**	**23**	
1994–95	Division 1	**1st**	40	30	16	8	6	49	25	Round of 32	Runners–up	Cup Winners' Cup	**Winners**	**(Algeria) Tarek Hadj Adlane**	**30**	
1995–96	Division 1	5th	45	30	13	6	11	34	29	Round of 16	Runners–up	Cup of Champions Clubs	Semi-Finals	(Algeria) Tarek Hadj Adlane	12	
1995–96	Division 1	5th	45	30	13	6	11	34	29	Round of 16	Runners–up	CAF Super Cup	Runners–up	(Algeria) Tarek Hadj Adlane	12	
1996–97	Division 1	8th	41	30	12	5	13	35	41	Round of 16				(Algeria) Hakim Boubrit	6	
1997–98	Division 1	4th	22	14	6	4	4	14	11	Round of 32	Round of 16			(Algeria) Mourad Aït Tahar	9	
1998–99	Super Division	2nd	52	27	16	4	7	49	18	Runners–up				**(Algeria) Farid Ghazi**	**23**	
1999–00	Super Division	6th	29	22	7	8	7	21	24	Semi-final	Group stage	CAF Cup	Quarter-finals	(Algeria) Hocine Gasmi & (Algeria) Fawzi Moussouni	7	
2000–01	Super Division	3rd	52	30	16	4	10	47	28	Round of 64		CAF Cup	**Winners**	(Algeria) Fawzi Moussouni	15	
2001–02	Division 1	2nd	52	30	15	7	8	47	24	Semi-final		CAF Cup	**Winners**	(Algeria) Mounir Dob	14	
2002–03	Division 1	4th	49	30	13	10	7	38	24	Quarter-final		CAF Cup	**Winners**	(Algeria) Farouk Belkaid	9	
2003–04	Division 1	**1st**	61	30	17	10	3	40	21	Runners–up		CAF Cup	Quarter-finals	(Algeria) Moussa Saïb	10	
2004–05	Division 1	2nd	54	30	16	6	8	44	22	Round of 64		Champions League	First round	**(Algeria) Hamid Berguiga**	**18**	
2005–06	Division 1	**1st**	58	30	17	7	6	47	21	Semi-final		Champions League	Group stage	**(Algeria) Hamid Berguiga**	**22**	
2006–07	Division 1	2nd	52	30	14	10	6	33	20	Semi-final	Runners–up	Champions League	Group stage	**(Mali) Cheick Oumar Dabo**	**27**	
2007–08	Division 1	**1st**	59	30	18	5	7	46	24	Round of 64		Champions League	Second round	**(Algeria) Nabil Hemani**	**19**	
2007–08	Division 1	**1st**	59	30	18	5	7	46	24	Round of 64		Confederation Cup	Group stage	**(Algeria) Nabil Hemani**	**19**	
2008–09	Division 1	2nd	59	32	15	14	3	38	19	Round of 64		Champions League	First round	(Algeria) Adlène Bensaïd	10	
2009–10	Division 1	3rd	54	34	15	9	10	40	28	Semi-final		Champions League	Semi-Finals	(Algeria) Sid Ali Yahia-Chérif	11	
2010–11	Ligue 1	11th	37	30	10	7	13	26	37	**Winners**		Confederation Cup	Group stage	(Algeria) Farès Hamiti	13	
2011–12	Ligue 1	9th	41	30	10	11	9	29	23	Round of 16				(Algeria) Salim Hanifi	11	
2012–13	Ligue 1	7th	41	30	11	8	11	32	31	Round of 32				(Algeria) Ahmed Messadia	11	
2013–14	Ligue 1	2nd	54	30	15	9	6	39	21	Runners–up				**(Cameroon) Albert Ebossé Bodjongo**	**23**	
2014–15	Ligue 1	13th	39	30	11	6	13	33	35	Round of 64				(Algeria) Ali Rial	12	
2015–16	Ligue 1	3rd	45	30	12	9	9	27	27	Round of 64				(Burkina Faso) Banou Diawara	11	
2016–17	Ligue 1	11th	38	30	8	14	8	20	24	Quarter-finals		Confederation Cup	Second round	(Algeria) Mohamed Boulaouidet	15	
2017–18	Ligue 1	11th	36	30	8	12	10	34	39	Runners–up				(Algeria) Mehdi Benaldjia	12	
2018–19	Ligue 1	2nd	52	30	15	7	8	38	25	Round of 64				(Algeria) Rezki Hamroune	9	
2019–20	Ligue 1 (Note: On March 15, 2020, the Ligue de Football Professionnel (LFP) decided to halt the season due to the COVID-19 pandemic in Algeria. On July 29, 2020, the LFP declared that season is over and CR Belouizdad to be the champion, the promotion of four teams from the League 2, and scraping the relegation for the current season.)	4th	36	22	10	6	6	27	18	Round of 64		Champions League	Group stage	(Algeria) Hamza Banouh	7	
2020–21	Ligue 1	5th	61	38	17	10	11	44	33	Not Played	**Winners**	Confederation Cup	Runners-up	(Algeria) Rédha Bensayah	10	
2021–22	Ligue 1	2nd	61	34	16	13	5	40	20	Not Played		Confederation Cup	Preliminary	(Algeria) Rédha Bensayah	10	
2022–23	Ligue 1	14th	39	30	10	9	11	35	26	Round of 32		Champions League	Quarter-finals	(Algeria) Dadi El Hocine Mouaki	14	
2023–24	Ligue 1	7th	42	30	10	12	8	33	27	Round of 64				(Algeria) Redouane Berkane	8	
2024–25	Ligue 1	2nd	56	30	16	8	6	42	27	Round of 32				(Algeria) Redouane Berkane	10	
2025–26	Ligue 1	5th	45	30	11	12	7	40	31	Round of 32		Champions League	Group stage	**(Algeria) Aymen Mahious**	**15**	
2026–27	Ligue 1									Round of 64						

== Key ==
Key to league record:

- P = Played
- W = Games won
- D = Games drawn
- L = Games lost
- GF = Goals for
- GA = Goals against
- Pts = Points
- Pos = Final position

Key to divisions:

- 1 = Ligue 1
- 2 = Ligue 2

Key to rounds:

- DNE = Did not enter
- Grp = Group stage
- R1 = First Round
- R2 = Second Round
- R32 = Round of 32
- R16 = Round of 16
- QF = Quarter-finals
- SF = Semi-finals
- RU = Runners-up
- W = Winners

Champions	Runners-up	Promoted	Relegated

Division shown in bold to indicate a change in division.
Top scorers shown in bold are players who were also top scorers in their division that season.

=== List of leading goalscorers ===
Bold Still playing competitive football in JS Kabylie. (Note: Since 1989–90 season the statistics of all the games in league, Statistics correct as of game against ASO Chlef on March 7, 2020.)

Position key: GK – Goalkeeper; DF – Defender; MF – Midfielder; FW – Forward

List of JS Kabylie players with 10 or more goals
#	Name	Position	League	Cup	Others^{1}	Africa^{2}	Arab^{3}	TOTAL								
#	Name	Position	League	Cup	Others^{1}	Africa^{2}	Arab^{3}	TOTAL	(Algeria) Nacer Bouiche	1	113	13	0	11	0	**137**
	(Algeria) Tarek Hadj Adlane	2	70	10	3	9	2	**94**								
	(Algeria) Arezki Kouffi	3	+78	0	0	0	0	**+78**								
	(Algeria) Mourad Derridj	4	+70	0	0	0	0	**+70**								
	(Algeria) Djamel Menad	5	+39	+13	1	5	0	**+70**								
	(Algeria) Hamid Berguiga	6	51	6	0	8	0	**65**								
	(Algeria) Mokrane Baïleche	7	+30	+6	0	0	0	**+50**								
	(Algeria) Mourad Aït Tahar	8	35	8	0	4	0	**47**								
	(Algeria) Fawzi Moussouni	9	33	2	0	5	2	**42**								
	(Algeria) Nabil Hemani	10	29	6		4		**39**								
	(Algeria) Farid Ghazi		29	5		0	0	34								
	(Algeria) Farouk Belkaid		24	4		4		32								
	(Algeria) Mounir Dob		26	1		3		30								
	(Algeria) Abderrazak Djahnit		23	3		3		29								
	(Algeria) Tahar Benkaci		22	2		4		28								
	(Mali) Cheikh Oumar Dabo		17	1		10		28								
	(Algeria) Ali Rial		25	2				27								
	(Algeria) Hakim Medane		17	1		6		24								
	(Algeria) Mahieddine Meftah		17	2	1	3		23								
	(Algeria) Hamza Yacef		9	5		8		22								
	(Cameroon) Albert Ebossé Bodjongo		19	2				21								
	(Algeria) Mohamed Boulaouidet		16	5				21								
	(Algeria) Hakim Boubrit		14	3	2	2		21								
	(Algeria) Farès Hamiti		12	6		3		21								
	(Algeria) Amaouche		15	3		2		20								
	(Algeria) Moussa Saïb		14	4		2		20								
	(Algeria) Adlène Bensaïd		16			4		20								
	(Algeria) Rezki Hamroune		15			2		17								
	(Algeria) Aymen Mahious		14	1				15								
	(Algeria) Mehdi Benaldjia		11	1				12								
	(Algeria) Iratni Saïd		+11					+11								

^{1} ^{Includes the Super Cup.} ^{2} ^{Includes the Confederation Cup and Champions League.} ^{3} ^{Includes the UAFA Club Cup.}
