= Yesli =

Yesli is a surname. Notable people with the surname include:

- Kamel Yesli (born 1989), French-Algerian footballer
- Rayane Yesli (born 1999), Canadian-Algerian footballer
- Widad Yesli (born 2000), Algerian athlete
