= 2013–14 Algerian Cup =

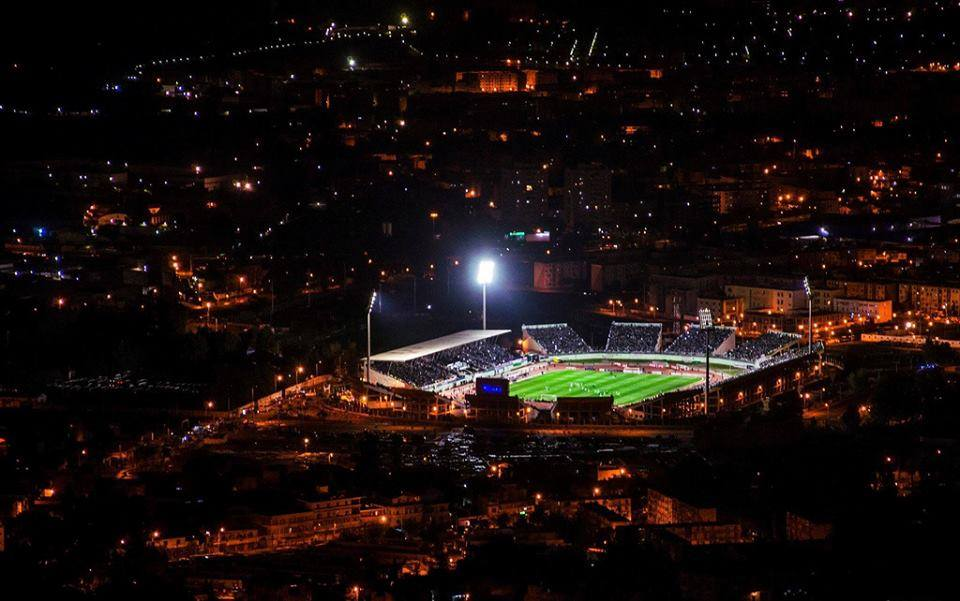
- Mustapha Tchaker Stadium hosted the final

Tournament details
- Country: Algeria
- Teams: 64 (as of first national round)

Final positions
- Champions: MC Alger (7th title)
- Runners-up: JS Kabylie

Tournament statistics
- Top goal scorer: Karim Ait Tahar (JSM Chéraga) (5 goals)

The 2013–14 Algerian Cup was the 50th edition of the Algerian Cup. The winners were MC Alger who qualified for the 2015 CAF Confederation Cup.

== Round of 64 ==
The round of 64 is the first national round of the Algerian Cup. On November 26, 2013, the draw for the rounds of 64 and 32 were held at a ceremony at the Sheraton Hotel in Algiers.

Tie no	Home team	Score	Away team
1	JS Pont Blanc	3-3 (4-3 P)	NRB Touggourt
2	IRB El Hadjar	1-1 (3-4 P)	AS Khroub
3	MO Béjaïa	1-0	CR Belouizdad
4	ES Bouakal	3-1	CA Batna
5	ORB Oued Fodda	3-1	IRB Robah
6	ES Tabalbala	0-9	JSM Chéraga
7	JS Kabylie	4-0	NRB El Kala
8	CRB Abadla	1-4 (a.e.t)	MO Constantine
9	SCM Oran	0-3	USM Bel-Abbès
10	MC Oran	3-1	JSB Chebaita Mokhtar
11	WM Tébessa	3-2	MC El Bayadh
12	Hydra AC	0-0 (5-4 P)	ASM Oran
13	NA Hussein Dey	0-0 (4-5 P)	USM Alger
14	MC Saïda	1-0	OM Arzew
15	USM El Harrach	2-1 (a.e.t)	RC Arbaâ
16	MSP Batna	1-0	WB Meftah
17	US Chaouia	2-1	CA Bordj Bou Arréridj
18	WR M'Sila	0-0 (1-3 P)	CRB Ben Badis
19	NC Magra	1-0	DRB Tadjenant
20	CS Constantine	1-0	JS Saoura
21	CRB Aïn Fakroun	3-0	JSM Skikda
22	ES Sétif	2-0	NT Souf
23	US Beni Douala	0-0 (4-3 P)	IB Lakhdaria
24	USMM Hadjout	3-1	MB Bouira
25	O. Médéa	2-1	CRB Bougtob
26	IB Mouzaia	1-4	A Bou Saâda
27	MC Alger	2-0	ASO Chlef
28	WA Ramdane Djamel	1-2	ES Ben Aknoun
29	IR Bir Mourad Raïs	1-3	JSM Béjaïa
30	AS Aïn M'lila	1-1 (3-2 P)	CRB Djemaa
31	JSM Tiaret	3-2	MC El Eulma
32	US Remchi	3-1	JS Emir Abdelkader

== Round of 32 ==
The round of 32 was held on 21 and 22 December 2013.

December 20, 2013	JS Pont Blanc	1 – 1 (5 – 6 p)	USMM Hadjout	Stade du Colonel Chabou, Annaba
14 h 30	Zebertai 84'	Repport	73' Khiter	Referee: Marniz, Benhamidouche, Chelali

December 21, 2013	JSM Chéraga	2 – 0	WM Tébessa	Stade 20 Août 1955, Algiers
15 h 30	Touati 25', 50'	Repport		Referee: Oukil, Miraoui, Tadji

December 21, 2013	JSM Tiaret	1 – 0 (a.e.t)	O Médéa	Stade Ahmed Kaïd, Tiaret
14 h 30	Mechlouf 118'	Repport		Referee: Benbrahim, Semsoum, Yahi

December 20, 2013	NC Magra	1 – 0 (a.e.t)	ES Ben Aknoun	Stade Abdelmadjid-Mokhtari, Bou Saâda
14 h 30	Medjdoub 114'	Repport		Referee: Benfrioua, Hadji, Bousmaha

December 20, 2013	MC Oran	2 – 1 (a.e.t)	JSM Béjaïa	Stade Ahmed Zabana, Oran
17 h 00	Kouriba 70'; Amrane 111'	Repport	90' (pen.) Coulibaly	Referee: Arab, Bazine, Chenaoua

December 21, 2013	MC Saïda	0 – 0 (4 – 3 p)	USM Bel-Abbès	Stade 13 Avril 1958, Saïda
14 h 30		Repport		Referee: Bichari, Gourari et Bourouba

December 21, 2013	ES Bouakal	3 – 2 (a.e.t)	ORB Oued Fodda	Stade 1er Novembre 1954, Batna
15 h 00	Mehdi 5'; Harkat 50'; Khenab 100' (pen.)	Repport	21' Ketaoui; 37' Mohamed Bouzina	Referee: Bousaâdia, Belakhal, Sifouni

December 21, 2013	USM Alger	0 – 0 (2 – 3 p)	JS Kabylie	Stade Omar Hamadi, Algiers
17 h 00		Repport		Attendance: 20.000; Referee: Haïmoudi, Itchiali et Benmansour

December 21, 2013	CS Constantine	2 – 0	MO Béjaïa	Stade Mohamed Hamlaoui, Constantine
16 h 00	Abdelhak Sameur 78'; Hamza Boulemdaïs 80'	Repport		Referee: Sahraoui, Hadj Said, Abid

December 20, 2013	MC Alger	1 – 0	CRB Ben Badis	Stade Omar Hamadi, Algiers
16 h 00	Abderahmane Hachoud 24'	Repport		Referee: Bouchama, Bourahla, Guessoum

December 20, 2013	AS Khroub	2 – 2 (5 – 6 p)	MO Constantine	Stade Abed Hamdani, El Khroub
14 h 30	Djamouni 45', 53'	Repport	44', 56' Brahmia	Referee: Sakhraoui, Rachedi, Boulekrinet

December 20, 2013	CRB Aïn Fakroun	0 – 0 (4 – 3 p)	RC Arbaâ	Stade des frères Demane-Debbih, Aïn M'lila
14 h 30		Repport		Referee: Saïdi, Bechirene, Rezguane

December 21, 2013	US Beni Douala	1 – 1 (3 – 2 p)	MSP Batna	Stade 1er Novembre 1954, Tizi Ouzou
15 h 00	Hadj Kaci 35' (pen.)	Repport	19' (pen.) Guerab	Referee: Mohamed Bessiri, Bouchache et Bourechou

December 21, 2013	ES Sétif	3 – 0	US Remchi	Stade 8 Mai 1945, Sétif
16 h 00	Laïd Madouni 76'; Akram Djahnit 79'; Khaled Gourmi 90'	Repport		Referee: Boukouassa, Salaouati, Saïdi

December 21, 2013	US Chaouia	3 – 1	AS Aïn M'lila	Stade Hassouna-Zerdani, Oum El Bouaghi
14 h 30	Youcef Khodja 32'; Mehimedati 72'; Demene 85'	Repport	84' Gasmi	Referee: Achouri, Amri, Bougherara

December 20, 2013	Hydra AC	0 – 2 (a.e.t)	A Bou Saada	Stade 20 Août 1955, Algiers
15 h 00		Repport	98' Laraf; 116' Nezouani	Referee: Brahimi, Chebala, Idir

== Round of 16 ==
The draw for the round of 16 was held on January 8.

January 24, 2014	USMM Hadjout	1 – 0	JSM Tiaret	Stade du 5-Juillet 1962, Hadjout
15 h 00	Souakir 13'	Repport		Attendance: 8.000; Referee: Necib, Boudebouz, Boutaghane

January 24, 2014	ES Sétif	1 – 1 (0 – 3 p)	CS Constantine	Stade 8 Mai 1945, Sétif
16 h 30	Abdelghani Demmou 76'	Repport	42' Hamza Boulemdaïs	Referee: Haïmoudi, Etchiali, Omari

January 25, 2014	US Chaouia	2 – 2 (2 – 4 p)	MC Alger	Stade Hassouna-Zerdani, Oum El Bouaghi
15 h 00	Goumidi 13'; H. Demane 44'	Repport	83' Sid Ali Yahia-Chérif; 90' (pen.) Moustapha Djallit	Attendance: 10.000; Referee: Ghorbal, Serradj, Cherchar

January 24, 2014	NC Magra	1 – 1 (3 – 4 p)	MC Oran	Stade Ahmed-Khalfa, M'Sila
15 h 00	Mejdoub 1'	Repport	90' Eudes Dagoulou	Referee: Hallalchi, Azrine, Badache

January 24, 2014	US Beni Douala	0 – 1	MO Constantine	Stade 1er Novembre 1954, Tizi Ouzou
15 h 00		Repport	24' Brahmia	Referee: Boukhalfa, Hallam, Zarhouni

January 25, 2014	A Bou Saada	2 – 2 (3 – 4 p)	CRB Aïn Fakroun	Stade Abdelmadjid-Mokhtari, Bou Saâda
15 h 00	Nouara 43'; Boukhari 100'	Repport	65' Daouadi; 107' Belalem	Referee: Achouri, Amari, Bougherara

January 25, 2014	JSM Chéraga	1 – 0	ES Bouakal	Stade Omar Hamadi, Algiers
15 h 00	Nait 38'	Repport		Referee: Nader, Messali, Belhocine

January 25, 2014	MC Saïda	0 - 1	JS Kabylie	Stade 13 Avril 1958, Saïda
15 h 00		Repport	11' Kamel Yesli	Referee: Abid Charef, Tamen, Zid

== Quarter-finals ==
February 18, 2014	JSM Chéraga	2 – 1	CS Constantine	Stade Omar Hamadi, Algiers
17 h 30	Abdou 67' (pen.); Kolli 70'	Repport	68' Fouad Allag	Attendance: 10.000; Referee: Ghorbal, Serradj, Rezkane

February 18, 2014	CRB Aïn Fakroun	2 – 1	MO Constantine	Stade des frères Demane-Debbih, Aïn M'lila
14 h 30	Kara 49', 75'	Repport	20' Si Amar	Referee: Bichari, Bourouba, Gourari

February 18, 2014	JS Kabylie	1 – 0	MC Oran	Stade 1er Novembre 1954, Tizi Ouzou
15 h 00	Madi 80'	Repport		Attendance: 15.000; Referee: Zouaoui, Bitam, F. Aouina

February 18, 2014	USMM Hadjout	0 – 1	MC Alger	Stade du 5-Juillet 1962, Hadjout
14 h 30		Repport	1' Moustapha Djallit	Attendance: 14.000; Referee: Benouza, Bouhassoune, Omari

== Semi-finals ==
28 March 2014
16:00

JS Kabylie	2 – 1 (a.e.t.)	CRB Aïn Fakroun
Ali Rial 97'; Albert Ebossé Bodjongo 117'	Report	106' Daïra

Stade 1er Novembre 1954, Tizi Ouzou
Attendance: 15.000
Referee: Abid Charef, Bitam, Tamen

29 March 2014
17:45

JSM Chéraga	0 – 2	MC Alger
	Report	27' Hadj Bouguèche; 36' Sabri Gharbi

Stade Omar Hamadi, Algiers
Attendance: 18.000
Referee: Arab, Bazine, Moukar

== Final ==
Tie no	Home team	Score	Away team	Stadium
1	JS Kabylie	1 – 1 (4 – 5 P)	MC Alger	Stade Mustapha Tchaker, Blida

=== Match ===
May 1, 2013

JS Kabylie	1 – 1	MC Alger
Rial 88' (pen.)	Repport	4' (o.g.) Rial
Penalties
Rial (penalty missed); Remache (penalty scored); Raiah (penalty scored); Ebossé (penalty scored)... (penalty scored)	4 – 5	(penalty scored) Yachir; (penalty scored) ... (penalty scored) Bouguèche; (penalty scored) Djeghbala; (penalty scored) Gharbi

Stade Mustapha Tchaker, Blida
Attendance: 35,000
Referee: Mohamed Bichari
