= Karim Boutadjine =

French footballer (born 1989)

Personal information
- Full name: Abdel Karim Boutadjine
- Date of birth: 23 March 1989 (age 37)
- Place of birth: Argenteuil, France
- Height: 1.78 m (5 ft 10 in)
- Position: Forward

Team information
- Current team: AS Saint-Ouen-l'Aumône

Senior career*
Years	Team	Apps	(Gls)
2007–2009	Laval	3	(1)
2007–2009	Laval B	40	(8)
2009–2010	Bayonne	20	(0)
2010	UJA Alfortville	4	(0)
2010–2011	Noisy-le-Sec	17	(4)
2011–2012	Évian TG II	1	(0)
2012–2013	Pandurii Târgu Jiu	18	(3)
2014	Universitatea Cluj	23	(2)
2015	JS Kabylie	5	(1)
2017–	AS Saint-Ouen-l'Aumône	13	(1)
- * Club domestic league appearances and goals as of 9 June 2018

Abdel Karim Boutadjine (born 23 March 1989) is a French football player of Algerian descent who plays as a forward. He is under contract with AS Saint-Ouen-l'Aumône.

== Career ==
Boutadjine played for several lower league French teams as Laval, Bayonne, UJA Alfortville, Noisy-le-Sec, Évian TG II before joining the Romanian first league Pandurii Târgu Jiu. He played one season for Pandurii, being mostly used as a substitute.

In June 2013 Boutadjine was close to be transferred by Dinamo București but was not kept in the team after being tested in trial games, due to weak performances. In January 2014 he joined the Liga I team, Universitatea Cluj.

== Honours ==
=== Club ===
Pandurii

- Liga I: runner-up 2013
