= Yacine Si Salem =

French footballer (born 1988)

Personal information
- Full name: Yacine Si Salem
- Date of birth: 10 January 1988 (age 38)
- Place of birth: Souk El Thenine, Algeria
- Height: 1.80 m (5 ft 11 in)
- Position: Attacking midfielder

Team information
- Current team: Besa Pejë

Youth career
- 1999–2007: Le Havre

Senior career*
Years	Team	Apps	(Gls)
2007–2008	Le Havre B		
2008–2010	Thrasyvoulos		
2010–2011	Oissel	6	(0)
2011	Grindavík	9	(1)
2012–2013	Belenenses	21	(2)
2013–2014	JS Kabylie	5	(0)
2014–2015	Le Mont	14	(0)
2015–2017	Rodez	21	(1)
2017–	Besa Pejë	0	(0)
- * Club domestic league appearances and goals as of 1 February 2017

Yacine Si Salem (born 10 January 1988) is a French footballer who plays for Kosovan club Besa Pejë as an attacking midfielder.

On 28 January 2007 Si Salem was called up for a training camp with the French Under-21 Futsal team for a 4-day camp. He has one cap for the team.
