= Djamel Benlamri =

Algerian footballer (born 1989)

Personal information
- Full name: Djamel Eddine Benlamri
- Date of birth: 25 December 1989 (age 36)
- Place of birth: Algiers, Algeria
- Height: 1.85 m (6 ft 1 in)
- Position: Centre-back

Youth career
- 2008–2009: IR Hussein Dey

Senior career*
Years	Team	Apps	(Gls)
2009–2012	NA Hussein Dey	54	(1)
2012–2015	JS Kabylie	78	(2)
2015–2016	ES Sétif	17	(0)
2016–2020	Al-Shabab	67	(1)
2020–2021	Lyon	6	(0)
2021–2022	Qatar SC	16	(1)
2022–2023	Al-Khaleej	9	(0)
2023	Al-Wasl	9	(0)
2023–2024	MC Alger	23	(0)
2024	Al-Shorta	0	(0)
2025–2026	ES Mostaganem	20	(1)

International career^{‡}
2011	Algeria U23	10	(1)
2021	Algeria A'	6	(2)
2018–2022	Algeria	29	(0)
Medal record
Representing Algeria
FIFA Arab Cup
Winner	2021 Qatar
Africa Cup of Nations
Winner	2019 Egypt
- * Club domestic league appearances and goals as of 14 February 2026 ‡ National team caps and goals as of 14 February 2026

Djamel Eddine Benlamri (Arabic: جمال الدين بن العمري, born 25 December 1989) is an Algerian professional footballer who plays as a centre-back for Algeria national team.

== Club career ==
On 29 May 2009, Benlamri joined NA Hussein Dey, signing a three-year contract with the club.

Free agent Benlamri signed with Ligue 1 club Olympique Lyonnais in October 2020 on a one-year contract with the option of a second. It was his first European move. Lyon had previously sold Marçal to Wolverhampton Wanderers, loaned Joachim Andersen to Fulham and lost Marcelo to injury.

On 20 June 2022, Benlamri joined Saudi Arabian club Al-Khaleej. On 12 January 2023, Benlamri and Al-Khaleej agreed to end their contract mutually.

On 15 February 2023, he joined Emirati club Al-Wasl until the end of the season.

On 20 July 2023, Benlamri joined MC Alger.

== International career ==
On 16 November 2011, Benlamri was selected as part of Algeria's squad for the 2011 CAF U-23 Championship in Morocco.

On 12 May 2012, he was called up for the first time to the Algeria national team for the 2014 FIFA World Cup qualifiers against Mali and Rwanda, and the return leg of the 2013 Africa Cup of Nations qualifier against Gambia. However, he had to withdraw from the squad due to injury. He made his debut for Algeria on 18 November 2018 in an Africa Cup of Nations qualifier against Togo, as a starter.

He was a member of the squad that won the 2019 Africa Cup of Nations and 2021 FIFA Arab Cup in the final of the competition.

== Career statistics ==
=== Club ===
As of 30 May 2021.

Club	Season	League			Cup		Continental		Other		Total	
Club	Season	Division	Apps	Goals	Apps	Goals	Apps	Goals	Apps	Goals	Apps	Goals
NA Hussein Dey	2009–10	Algerian National 1	15	1	1	0	—		—		16	1
NA Hussein Dey	2010–11	Algerian Ligue 2	21	0	1	0	—		—		22	0
NA Hussein Dey	2011–12	Algerian Ligue 1	18	0	0	0	—		—		18	0
NA Hussein Dey	Total		54	1	2	0	—		—		56	1
JS Kabylie	2012–13	Algerian Ligue 1	25	0	2	0	—		—		27	0
JS Kabylie	2013–14	Algerian Ligue 1	27	2	5	0	—		—		32	2
JS Kabylie	2014–15	Algerian Ligue 1	26	0	4	0	—		—		30	0
JS Kabylie	Total		78	2	11	0	—		—		99	2
ES Sétif	2015–16	Algerian Ligue 1	17	0	1	0	4 (Note: All appearances in CAF Champions League)	0	1 (Note: Appearance in Algerian Super Cup)	0	23	0
Al-Shabab	2016–17	Saudi Pro League	21	0	0	0	—		2 (Note: All appearances in Saudi Crown Prince Cup)	0	23	0
Al-Shabab	2017–18	Saudi Pro League	12	0	1	0	—		1	0	14	0
Al-Shabab	2018–19	Saudi Pro League	25	1	2	0	—		—		27	1
Al-Shabab	2019–20	Saudi Pro League	9	0	0	0	—		4 (Note: All appearances in Arab Club Champions Cup)	1	13	1
Al-Shabab	Total		67	1	3	0	—		7	1	77	2
Lyon	2020–21	Ligue 1	6	0	2	1	—		—		8	1
Career total			205	4	19	1	4	0	8	1	236	6

=== International ===
As of match played 15 December 2021.

Appearances and goals by national team and year
National team	Year	Apps	Goals
Algeria
Algeria	2018	1	0
Algeria	2019	13	0
Algeria	2020	2	0
Algeria	2021	3	1
Total		19	1

No.	Date	Venue	Opponent	Score	Result	Competition
1.	1 December 2021	Ahmed bin Ali Stadium, Al Rayyan, Qatar	Sudan	3–0	4–0	2021 FIFA Arab Cup
2.	15 December 2021	Al Thumama Stadium, Doha, Qatar	Qatar	1–0	2–1	2021 FIFA Arab Cup

== Honours ==
Algeria

- FIFA Arab Cup: 2021
- Africa Cup of Nations: 2019

Individual

- FIFA Arab Cup Team of the Tournament: 2021
