= Sabri Gharbi =

Algerian footballer (born 1987)

Personal information
- Full name: Sabri Gharbi
- Date of birth: May 26, 1987 (age 39)
- Place of birth: Relizane, Algeria
- Height: 1.87 m (6 ft 1 1/2 in)
- Position: Defender

Team information
- Current team: RC Relizane
- Number: 10

Youth career
- 1997–2006: ASO Chlef

Senior career*
Years	Team	Apps	(Gls)
2006–2013	ASO Chlef	120	(5)
2013–2015	MC Alger	39	(0)
2015–2016	CS Constantine	16	(1)
2016–2017	O Médéa	24	(4)
2017–2019	MC Oran	30	(4)
2019–2020	USM Bel Abbès	10	(0)
2020–	RC Relizane	38	(0)
2022	→ Fujairah (loan)	0	(0)
- * Club domestic league appearances and goals as of 21 June 2020

Sabri Gharbi (born May 26, 1987) is an Algerian football player. He currently plays for RC Relizane in the Algerian Ligue Professionnelle 1.

== Honours ==
ASO Chlef

- Algerian Ligue 1: 2010–11

MC Alger

- Algerian Cup: 2013–14
- Algerian Super Cup: 2014
