= Farid Beziouen =

French footballer (born 1986)

Personal information
- Date of birth: 17 October 1986 (age 40)
- Place of birth: Saint-Denis, Paris, France
- Height: 1.68 m (5 ft 6 in)
- Position: Midfielder

Team information
- Current team: FC 93 B-B-G
- Number: 10

Senior career*
Years	Team	Apps	(Gls)
2006–2008	Noisy-le-Sec		
2008–2010	Créteil	38	(4)
2010–2012	Red Star	57	(14)
2012–2013	Sedan	13	(3)
2013–2014	JS Kabylie	22	(2)
2014–2015	Red Star	25	(3)
2015–2016	Avranches	31	(17)
2016–2017	Orléans	18	(1)
2017–2019	Fleury 91	53	(23)
2019–2021	US Lusitanos	24	(5)
2021–	FC 93 B-B-G	26	(10)
- * Club domestic league appearances and goals as of 1 July 2022

Farid Beziouen (born 17 October 1986) is a French professional footballer who plays for FC 93 B-B-G.

== Personal life ==
Farid Beziouen was born in Saint-Denis, in the northern suburbs of Paris. He holds both French and Algerian nationalities.

== Career ==
In June 2019, Beziouen joined US Lusitanos Saint-Maur.
