= Mohand Chérif Hannachi =

Algerian footballer and chairman (1950–2020)

Personal information
- Date of birth: 2 April 1950
- Place of birth: Larbaâ Nath Irathen, Algeria
- Date of death: 13 November 2020 (aged 70)
- Place of death: Algiers, Algeria
- Position: Central defender

Senior career*
Years	Team	Apps	(Gls)
- JS Kabylie

International career
1972–1978	Algeria	3	(1)
- * Club domestic league appearances and goals

Mohand Chérif Hannachi (2 April 1950 – 13 November 2020) was an Algerian football player and chairman of Algerian club JS Kabylie. He was the team chairman from his election in 1993 until 2017.

Hannachi died on 13 November 2020, in Algiers at the age of 70 from COVID-19.

== Chairman Honours ==
- Won the African Cup Winners Cup once in 1995
- Won the CAF Cup three times in 2000, 2001 and 2002
- Won the Algerian league four times in 1995, 2004, 2006 and 2008
- Won the Algerian Cup two times in 1994 and 2011
