= Abdelmalek Mokdad =

Algerian footballer (born 1986)

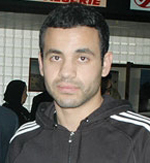
- Mokdad in 2009

Personal information
- Date of birth: 5 May 1986 (age 40)
- Place of birth: Ain El Hadjar, Algeria
- Height: 1.75 m (5 ft 9 in)
- Position: Midfielder

Youth career
- 2004–2006: Créteil

Senior career*
| Years | Team | Apps | (Gls) |
| 2006–2009 | Créteil | 53 | (5) |
| 2009–2011 | MC Alger | 44 | (11) |
| 2011–2012 | Ittihad Kalba | | |
| 2012–2013 | JS Kabylie | 18 | (4) |
| 2013–2015 | RC Arbaâ | 41 | (5) |
| 2015–2017 | MC Alger | 37 | (1) |
| 2018–2022 | Créteil | 98 | (22) |
| 2018–2021 | Créteil B | 4 | (3) |
| 2022–2023 | Chambly | 21 | (3) |

International career
| 2010 | Algeria A' | 1 | (0) |
- * Club domestic league appearances and goals

Abdelmalek Mokdad (Arabic: عبد المالك مقداد; born 5 May 1986) is an Algerian professional footballer who plays as a midfielder.

== Club career ==
On 6 July 2011, Mokdad signed a one-year contract with Emirati club Ittihad Kalba.

On 18 July 2012, Mokdad returned to Algeria and signed a two-year contract with JS Kabylie.

Mokdad returned to Créteil in July 2018. In 2022, he signed for Chambly.

== Honours ==
MC Alger

- Algerian Championnat National: 2009–10
