= Kaci Sedkaoui =

Algerian footballer (born 1986)

Personal information
- Full name: Kaci Sedkaoui
- Date of birth: July 4, 1986 (age 40)
- Place of birth: Draâ Ben Khedda, Algeria
- Position: Midfielder

Team information
- Current team: ASO Chlef

Youth career
- USM Draâ Ben Khedda

Senior career*
| Years | Team | Apps | (Gls) |
| 2006–2007 | RC Kouba | - | (-) |
| 2007–2011 | NA Hussein Dey | - | (-) |
| 2011–2014 | JS Kabylie | 1 | (0) |
| 2014– | ASO Chlef | 0 | (0) |
- * Club domestic league appearances and goals as of 00:00, 7 September 2011 (UTC)

Kaci Sedkaoui (born July 4, 1986) is an Algerian football player. He currently plays for ASO Chlef in the Algerian Ligue Professionnelle 1.

== Club career ==
On July 24, 2011, Sedkaoui signed a two-year contract with JS Kabylie. On September 6, 2011, he made his debut for the club as a 58th-minute substitute in a league match against MC Alger.
