= Zineddine Mekkaoui =

Algerian footballer (born 1987)

Personal information
- Full name: Zineddine Mekkaoui
- Date of birth: January 10, 1987 (age 39)
- Place of birth: Algiers, Algeria
- Height: 1.87 m (6 ft 1 1/2 in)
- Position: Defender

Team information
- Current team: MCB Oued Sly
- Number: 8

Senior career*
Years	Team	Apps	(Gls)
2004–2010	USM Alger	35	(1)
2009–2010	→ NA Hussein Dey (loan)	23	(2)
2010–2011	USM Annaba	29	(2)
2011–2012	CS Constantine	26	(1)
2012–2015	JS Kabylie	58	(2)
2015–2016	CS Constantine	12	(0)
2016–2017	RC Relizane	24	(1)
2017–2022	MC Oran	102	(3)
2022–2023	JS Bordj Ménaïel		
2023–	MCB Oued Sly		

International career
2006	Algeria U20	1	(0)
2007	Algeria U23	2	(0)
- * Club domestic league appearances and goals as of 29 September 2023

Zineddine Mekkaoui (Arabic: زين الدين مكاوي; born January 10, 1987) is an Algerian footballer who plays for MCB Oued Sly.

== Club career ==
In June 2009, Mekkaoui was loaned out by USM Alger to NA Hussein Dey for the 2009–10 season.
