= Kamel Yesli =

French-Algerian footballer (born 1989)

Personal information
- Date of birth: 24 April 1989 (age 37)
- Place of birth: Fontenay-aux-Roses, France
- Height: 1.75 m (5 ft 9 in)
- Position: Midfielder

Youth career
- PSG

Senior career*
Years	Team	Apps	(Gls)
-2007	PSG B		
2007-2008	Brétigny		
2008-2009	Sainte-Geneviève		
2010-2013	Paris FC	22	(0)
2013-2015	JS Kabylie	58	(3)
2016	MO Béjaïa	9	(0)
- * Club domestic league appearances and goals

Kamel Yesli (born 24 April 1989) is a French footballer who is last known to have played as a midfielder for MO Béjaïa.

== Career ==
Yesli started his career with the reserves of French Ligue 1 side PSG, but left due to injury. In 2007, Yesli signed for Brétigny in the French sixth division, where he said, "I knew the reputable club because it is known for its training. The coach gave me back confidence and I regained my feelings. In eight months, I had to put in about twenty assists and ten goals." In 2008, Yesli signed for French fourth division club Sainte-Geneviève, where he suffered relegation to the French fifth division.

In 2010, Yesli signed for Paris FC in the French third division, where he trialed for Spanish La Liga team Betis and San Jose Earthquakes in the United States. In 2013, Yesli signed for Algerian outfit JS Kabylie, where he made 62 appearances and scored 3 goals. On 3 September 2013, he debuted for JS Kabylie during a 4–3 win over MC El Eulma. On 3 September 2013, Yesli scored his first goal for JS Kabylie during a 4–3 win over MC El Eulma.
