= Albert Ebossé Bodjongo =

Cameroonian footballer (1989-2014)

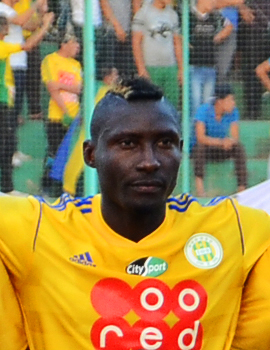

Personal information
- Full name: Albert Dominique Ebossé Bodjongo Dika
- Date of birth: 6 October 1989
- Place of birth: Douala, Cameroon
- Date of death: 23 August 2014 (aged 24)
- Place of death: Tizi Ouzou, Algeria
- Height: 1.85 m (6 ft 1 in)
- Position: Forward

Senior career*
Years	Team	Apps	(Gls)
2008–2010	Coton Sport FC		
2010–2011	Unisport Bafang		
2011–2012	Douala AC	10	(9)
2012–2013	Perak FA	16	(11)
2013–2014	JS Kabylie	41	(21)
Total		67	(41)

International career
2009	Cameroon U20		
- * Club domestic league appearances and goals as of 00:00, 24 August 2014 (EST)

Albert Dominique Ebossé Bodjongo Dika (6 October 1989 – 23 August 2014) was a Cameroonian professional footballer who played in Cameroon, Malaysia and Algeria.

== Career ==
Bodjongo played with his hometown club Douala Athletic Club, a club in MTN Elite Two, Cameroon's National Second Division. He also played for Coton Sport FC and Unisport Bafang in Cameroon.

He was signed by Malaysian club Perak FA on 15 April 2012 as a replacement for outgoing striker Lazar Popović. He made his league debut for Perak in a 2–2 draw with Sabah FA on 17 April 2012 and scored his first goal for the club in a 2–2 draw with Terengganu FA on 4 May 2012.

In July 2013, Bodjongo signed for JS Kabylie (JSK). He was the top scorer of the Algerian Championship in 2014 with 17 goals.

Bodjongo reportedly had six caps with the Cameroon national football team (mainly with the 'B' team), and had also played for the under-20 team in 2009.

== Death ==
On 23 August 2014, Bodjongo was struck on the head by a projectile thrown by an unknown person while the teams were leaving the field at the end of a home game between JSK and USM Alger. The match had ended in a 2–1 defeat, with Bodjongo contributing the sole JSK goal. Bodjongo died a few hours later in the hospital of a traumatic brain injury. He was aged 24. Following Bodjongo's death, the Algerian Football Federation suspended all football indefinitely and ordered the closure of the 1st November 1954 Stadium.

When the league resumed on Week 3 starting 12 September 2014, all matches that week were preceded by a minute of silence in memory of Bodjongo.

Subsequent coroner's post-mortem results released on 18 December 2014 showed Bodjongo may have died from a severe beating and not from a projectile, which was the initial claim.

== See also ==
- List of association footballers who died while playing
