= Ali Rial =

Algerian footballer (born 1980)

Personal information
- Full name: Ali Rial
- Date of birth: March 26, 1980 (age 46)
- Place of birth: Zemmouri, Algeria
- Position: Defender

Senior career*
Years	Team	Apps	(Gls)
2006–2007	NARB Réghaïa	-	(-)
2007–2010	USM Alger	81	(9)
2010–2017	JS Kabylie	163	(26)
- * Club domestic league appearances and goals as of 00:00, June 19, 2015 (EST)

Ali Rial (born March 26, 1980) is an Algerian football player who is playing as a defender.

== International career ==
In December 2012, Rial was included by Algeria coach Vahid Halilhodžić in an initial list of 40 players for the 2013 Africa Cup of Nations in South Africa. A week later, Halilhodžić narrowed the list down to 24 players, with Rial's name still on the list.

On January 17, 2013, Rial made his unofficial debut for Algeria as a starter in a friendly match against South African club Platinum Stars, which Algeria won 4–1.

== Honours ==
- Won the Algerian Cup once with JS Kabylie in 2010–11 Algerian Cup
