= 2006–07 JS Kabylie season =

JS Kabylie
2006–07 season
- President: Mohand Chérif Hannachi
- Head Coach: Azzedine Aït Djoudi
- Stadium: Stade du 1^{er} Novembre 1954
- National 1: Runners-up
- Algerian Cup: Semi-finals
- Super Cup: Runners–up
- CAF Champions League: 2006: Group stage 2007: Group stage
- Top goalscorer: League: Cheick Oumar Dabo (17 goals); All: Cheick Oumar Dabo (27 goals)

The 2006–07 season was JS Kabylie's 42nd season in the Algerian top flight, They competed in National 1, the Algerian Cup, and Super Cup and the Champions League.

== Squad list ==
Players and squad numbers last updated on 25 September 2006.
Note: Flags indicate national team as has been defined under FIFA eligibility rules. Players may hold more than one non-FIFA nationality.

No.	Nat.	Position	Name	Date of birth (age)	Signed from
Goalkeepers
12	(Algeria)	GK	Nabil Mazari	18 February 1984 (aged 22)	(Algeria) Youth system
13	(Algeria)	GK	Mourad Berrefane	18 March 1986 (aged 20)	(Algeria) Youth system
26	(Algeria)	GK	Faouzi Chaouchi	5 December 1984 (aged 22)	(Algeria) JS Bordj Ménaïel
1	(Algeria)	GK	Lounes Gaouaoui	28 September 1977 (aged 29)	(Algeria) USM Drâa Ben Khedda
Defenders
3	(Algeria)	CB	Brahim Zafour	30 November 1977 (aged 29)	(Algeria) Youth system
32	(Mali)	CB	Demba Barry	4 November 1987 (aged 19)	(Mali) AS Real Bamako
4	(Algeria)	CB	Mohamed Aït Kaci	20 June 1986 (aged 20)	(Algeria) Youth system
5	(Algeria)	CB	Sofiane Harkat	26 January 1984 (aged 22)	(Algeria) USM El Harrach
30	(Algeria)	RB	Mohamed Rabie Meftah	5 May 1985 (aged 21)	(Algeria) Youth system
24	(Algeria)	LB	Nassim Oussalah	8 October 1981 (aged 25)	(Algeria) MO Béjaïa
23	(Algeria)	LB	Sofiane Bengoureïne	10 October 1984 (aged 22)	(Algeria) ASM Oran
17	(Libya)	CB	Omar Daoud	9 April 1983 (aged 23)	(Libya) Olympic Azzaweya
	(Algeria)	CB	Rahim Meftah	15 August 1980 (aged 26)	(Algeria) Youth system
23	(Algeria)	CB	Anwar Boudjakdji	1 September 1976 (aged 30)	(Algeria) CR Belouizdad
Midfielders
18	(Algeria)	DM	Lamara Douicher	10 March 1980 (aged 26)	(Algeria) NR Béni Douala
8	(Algeria)	CM	Chérif Abdeslam	1 September 1978 (aged 28)	(Algeria) NA Hussein Dey
6	(Algeria)	DM	Nassim Hamlaoui	25 February 1981 (aged 25)	(Algeria) Youth system
25	(Algeria)	CM	Fahem Ouslati	14 March 1986 (aged 20)	(Algeria) CR Belouizdad
12	(Algeria)	AM	Kamel Marek	6 February 1980 (aged 26)	(Algeria) MO Béjaïa
17	(Algeria)	AM	Ali Bendebka	13 September 1976 (aged 30)	(Algeria) US Biskra
Forwards
14	(Algeria)	LW	Boubeker Athmani	11 November 1981 (aged 25)	(Algeria) USM Annaba
27	(Benin)		Wassiou Oladipupo	17 December 1983 (aged 23)	(Libya) Olympic Azzaweya
11	(Algeria)	ST	Nabil Hemani	1 September 1979 (aged 27)	(Algeria) OMR El Annasser
9	(Algeria)		Youcef Saïbi	22 August 1982 (aged 24)	(Algeria) WR Bentalha
16	(Algeria)		Mohamed Derrag	3 April 1985 (aged 21)	(Algeria) OMR El Annasser
7	(Algeria)	ST	Hamza Yacef	25 August 1979 (aged 27)	(Algeria) NA Hussein Dey
29	(Mali)	ST	Cheick Oumar Dabo	12 January 1981 (aged 25)	(United Arab Emirates) Dubai Club

== Competitions ==
=== Overview ===
Competition	Record								Started round	Final position / round	First match	Last match
Competition	G	W	D	L	GF	GA	GD	Win %	Started round	Final position / round	First match	Last match
National 1	30	14	10	6	33	20	+13	46.67	—N/a	Runners-up	10 August 2006	11 June 2007
Algerian Cup	5	3	1	1	10	5	+5	60.00	Round of 64	Semi-finals	5 February 2007	15 June 2007
Super Cup	1	0	0	1	1	2	−1	0.00	Final	Runners–up	1 November 2006	
2006 Champions League	6	1	1	4	4	9	−5	16.67	Group stage		16 July 2006	17 September 2006
2007 Champions League	8	5	0	3	13	7	+6	62.50	Preliminary round	Group stage	26 January 2007	6 July 2007
Total	50	23	12	15	61	43	+18	46.00				

Updated to match played 3 June 2019
Source: Competitions

=== National 1 ===
==== League table ====
Pos	Team	Pld	W	D	L	GF	GA	GD	Pts	Qualification or relegation
1	ES Sétif (C)	30	15	9	6	32	19	+13	54	2008 CAF Champions League
2	JS Kabylie	30	14	10	6	33	20	+13	52	2008 CAF Champions League
3	JSM Béjaïa	30	13	10	7	30	19	+11	49	2008 CAF Confederation Cup
4	USM Alger	30	13	8	9	32	25	+7	47	2007–08 Arab Champions League
5	ASO Chlef	30	12	10	8	29	22	+7	46	

Source: DZFOOT.COM
Rules for classification: 1) points; 2) goal difference; 3) number of goals scored.
(C) Champions

==== Results summary ====
Overall								Home						Away					
Pld	W	D	L	GF	GA	GD	Pts	W	D	L	GF	GA	GD	W	D	L	GF	GA	GD
30	14	10	6	33	20	+13	52	11	3	1	23	9	+14	3	7	5	10	11	−1

Last updated: 22 April 2018.
Source: Competitive matches

==== Results by round ====
Round	1	2	3	4	5	6	7	8	9	10	11	12	13	14	15	16	17	18	19	20	21	22	23	24	25	26	27	28	29	30
Ground	H	A	H	A	H	H	A	H	A	H	A	H	A	H	A	A	H	A	H	A	A	H	A	H	A	H	A	H	A	H
Result	L	D	W	W	W	D	L	D	L	W	D	W	L	L	D	D	D	D	W	D	W	W	W	W	L	W	D	W	L	W
Position	11	11	9	4	3	4	6	6	6	6	7	5	5	4	5	6	6	6	5	6	4	2	2	2	2	2	2	2	2	2

Source: Competitive matches
A = Away; H = Home; W = Win; D = Draw; L = Loss

=== Matches ===
Win Draw Loss

25 September 2006 Round 1	JS Kabylie	2–3	ES Sétif	Tizi Ouzou
14:30	Dabo 33', 66'		Ziaya 35', 75'; Bourahli 45'	Stadium: Stade 1er Novembre 1954; Referee: Djamel Haimoudi

21 August 2006 Round 2	NA Hussein Dey	0–0	JS Kabylie	Algiers
16:00				Stadium: Stade Frères Zioui; Referee: Mohamed Amine Belhacène

13 November 2006 Round 3	JS Kabylie	1–0	MC Alger	Tizi Ouzou
17:00	Hemani 61'			Stadium: Stade 1er Novembre 1954; Referee: Djamel Haimoudi

27 November 2006 Round 4	USM Blida	0–1	JS Kabylie	Blida
17:00			Dabo 57'	Stadium: Stade Mustapha Tchaker; Referee: Fouad Djerboua

11 December 2006 Round 5	JS Kabylie	2–1	ASO Chlef	Tizi Ouzou
17:00	Oussalah 40'; Dabo 67'		Soudani 77'	Stadium: Stade 1er Novembre 1954; Referee: Mehdi Abid Charef

21 September 2006 Round 6	JS Kabylie	0–0	Paradou AC	Tizi Ouzou
16:00				Stadium: Stade 1er Novembre 1954; Referee: Belkacem Boumaza

29 September 2006 Round 7	JSM Béjaïa	1–0	JS Kabylie	Béjaïa
15:30	Lahmar 25'			Stadium: Stade de l'Unité Maghrébine; Referee: Mohamed Amine Belhacène

12 October 2006 Round 8	JS Kabylie	1–1	ASM Oran	Tizi Ouzou
14:30	Dabo 56'		Hanitser 45'	Stadium: Stade 1er Novembre 1954; Referee: Okba Benbaka

19 October 2006 Round 9	CR Belouizdad	3–2	JS Kabylie	Algiers
14:30	Aoudia 2'; Aït Ouamar 4', 35'		Dabo 81'	Stadium: Stade 20 Août 1955; Referee: Mokhtar Amalou

26 October 2006 Round 10	JS Kabylie	1–0	USM Alger	Tizi Ouzou
14:30	Yacef 55'			Stadium: Stade 1er Novembre; Referee: Mustapha Boumediene Mansouri

9 November 2006 Round 11	CA Batna	1–1	JS Kabylie	Batna
15:30	Soualah 10'		Hemani 61'	Stadium: Stade 1er Novembre 1954; Referee: Mohamed Benouza

23 November 2006 Round 12	JS Kabylie	1–0	WA Tlemcen	Tizi Ouzou
	Dabo 23'			Stadium: Stade 1er Novembre 1954; Referee: Mohamed Amine Benaissa

30 November 2006 Round 13	CA Bordj Bou Arreridj	1–0	JS Kabylie	Bordj Bou Arréridj
	Boudjelid 8'			Stadium: Stade 20 Août 1955; Referee: Houari Belkacem

7 December 2006 Round 14	JS Kabylie	2–1	MC Oran	Tizi Ouzou
14:30	Dabo 79'; Hamlaoui 85'		Meddahi 77'	Stadium: Stade 1er Novembre 1954; Referee: Nabil Rahmine

15 December 2006 Round 15	OMR El Annasser	0–0	JS Kabylie	Algiers
				Stadium: Stade 20 Août 1955; Referee: Djamel Haimoudi

15 January 2007 Round 16	ES Sétif	0–0	JS Kabylie	Sétif
18:00				Stadium: Stade 8 Mai 1945; Referee: Mohamed Fettouha

18 January 2007 Round 17	JS Kabylie	1–1	NA Hussein Dey	Tizi Ouzou
14:30	Yacef 60'		Bengoureïne 45' (o.g.)	Stadium: Stade 1er Novembre 1954; Referee: Mohamed Benouza

22 January 2007 Round 18	MC Alger	0–0	JS Kabylie	Algiers
14:30				Stadium: Stade 5 Juillet 1962; Referee: Touati Djaballah

1 February 2007 Round 19	JS Kabylie	3–0	USM Blida	Tizi Ouzou
14:30	Oussalah 15', 69'; Dabo 90'			Stadium: Stade 1er Novembre 1954; Referee: Mustapha Boumediene Mansouri

19 February 2007 Round 20	ASO Chlef	0–0	JS Kabylie	Chlef
14:30				Stadium: Stade Mohamed Boumezrag; Referee: Djamel Haimoudi

23 February 2007 Round 21	Paradou AC	1–2	JS Kabylie	Bologhine
14:30	Hamouda 47'		Dabo 42', 75'	Stadium: Stade Omar Hammadi; Referee: Mokhtar Amalou

2 April 2007 Round 22	JS Kabylie	1–0	JSM Béjaïa	Tizi Ouzou
	Dabo 38'			Stadium: Stade 1er Novembre 1954; Referee: Houari Belkacem

12 March 2007 Round 23	ASM Oran	0–2	JS Kabylie	Oran
			Dabo 60'; Hemani 85'	Stadium: Habib Bouakeul Stadium; Referee: Mohamed Khelifi

29 March 2007 Round 24	JS Kabylie	1–0	CR Belouizdad	Tizi Ouzou
14:30	Meftah 15'			Stadium: Stade 1er Novembre 1954; Referee: Mohamed Amine Benaissa

13 April 2007 Round 25	USM Alger	1–0	JS Kabylie	Bologhine
	Ghazi 18' (pen.)			Stadium: Omar Hamadi Stadium; Referee: Mehdi Abid Charef

7 May 2007 Round 26	JS Kabylie	1–0	CA Batna	Tizi Ouzou
	Dabo 38'			Stadium: Stade 1er Novembre 1954; Referee: Mohamed Fettouha

10 May 2007 Round 27	WA Tlemcen	2–2	JS Kabylie	Tlemcen
	Sylla 34'; Boudjakdji 85'		Barry 41'; Dabo 78'	Stadium: Stade Akid Lotfi; Referee: Rabah Boukedjar

30 May 2007 Round 28	JS Kabylie	2–0	CA Bordj Bou Arreridj	Tizi Ouzou
	Dabo 8', 80'			Stadium: Stade 1er Novembre 1954; Referee: Touati Djaballah

8 June 2007 Round 29	MC Oran	1–0	JS Kabylie	Oran
	Boukessassa 74'			Stadium: Stade Ahmed Zabana; Referee: Belkacem Boumaza

11 June 2007 Round 30	JS Kabylie	4–2	OMR El Annasser	Tizi Ouzou
	Bourakba 6', 48'; Ouslati 56'; Saïbi 80'		Bendahmane 23'; Messadi 61'	Stadium: Stade 1er Novembre 1954; Referee: Mokhtar Amalou

== Algerian Cup ==
29 January 2007 Round of 64	JS Kabylie	2–0	USM Sétif	Bouïra
14:00	Rahim Meftah 22'; Hemani 43'	Report		Stadium: Stade Rabah Bitat; Referee: Mohamed Khelifi
Note: Lineup for JS Kabylie - Chaouchi, Douicher, Saïbi (Hemani 34'), Oussalah, Bengorine, Dabo (Barry 63'), Hamlaoui, Meftah Mohamed, Zafour, Meftah Rahim, Bendebka (Marek 80').

16 February 2007 Round of 32	JS Kabylie	1–0	Hamra Annaba	Batna
14:00	Zafour	Report		Stadium: Stade 1er Novembre 1954
Note: Lineup for JS Kabylie - .

22 March 2007 Round of 16	AS Khroub	2–4 (a.e.t.)	JS Kabylie	Annaba
14:00	Derrahi 33'; Bourahli 36'		Harkat 6'; Hemani 66', 112'; Saïbi 95'	Stadium: Stade 19 Mai 1956; Referee: Belkacem Boumaza

24 May 2007 Quarter-finals	MC Oran	2–2 (a.e.t.) (5–6 p)	JS Kabylie	Aïn Defla
16:00	Berradja 28'; Haddou 62'		Dabo 33'; Abdeslam 90'	Stadium: Stade Abdelkader Khellal; Referee: Mohamed Khelifi
	Penalties
	Bouazza Feham (penalty scored); Kouider Boukessassa (penalty missed); Moulay Haddou (penalty scored); Karim Meddahi (penalty missed); Hichem Mezaïr (penalty scored); Kouider Boukessassa (penalty scored); Samir Hamidi (penalty scored); Gilles Binya (penalty missed)		(penalty missed) Cheikh Oumar Dabo; (penalty scored) Ali Bendebka; (penalty missed) Nassim Hamlaoui; (penalty scored) Chérif Abdeslam; (penalty scored) Sofiane Bengoureïne; (penalty scored) Kamel Marek; (penalty scored) Mohamed Rabie Meftah; (penalty scored) Faouzi Chaouchi

15 June 2007 Semi-finals	JS Kabylie	1–4	USM Alger	Blida
17:00	Hemani 76'		Abouta 18', 70'; Boucherit 44' (pen.); Doucoure 81'	Stadium: Stade Mustapha Tchaker; Referee: Touati Djaballah

== Algerian Super Cup ==
1 November 2006	JS Kabylie	1–2	MC Alger	Algiers
16:00	Douicher 55'		Bouguèche 40'; Belkaïd 75'	Stadium: Stade 5 Juillet 1962; Referee: Ahmed Awda (Egypt)

== 2006 Champions League ==
=== Group stage ===
==== Group A ====
Pos	Team	Pld	W	D	L	GF	GA	GD	Pts	Qualification
1	(Tunisia) CS Sfaxien	6	4	0	2	9	7	+2	12	Advance to knockout stage
2	(Egypt) Al Ahly	6	3	2	1	10	4	+6	11	Advance to knockout stage
3	(Ghana) Asante Kotoko	6	2	1	3	7	10	−3	7	
4	(Algeria) JS Kabylie	6	1	1	4	4	9	−5	4	

16 July 2006 1	JS Kabylie (Algeria)	1–0	(Ghana) Asante Kotoko	Algiers
	Hemani 10'			Stadium: Stade du 5 Juillet; Referee: Jerome Damon (South Africa)

29 July 2006 2	Al Ahly (Egypt)	2–0	(Algeria) JS Kabylie	Cairo
	Sedik 36'; Hosny 45'			Stadium: Cairo International Stadium; Referee: ([[]])

13 August 2006 3	JS Kabylie (Algeria)	0–1	(Tunisia) CS Sfaxien	Algiers
			Younes 78'	Stadium: Stade du 5 Juillet; Referee: ([[]])

26 August 2006 4	CS Sfaxien (Tunisia)	2–0	(Algeria) JS Kabylie	Sfax
21:00	Nafti 8'; Frimpong 36'			Stadium: Stade Taïeb Mhiri; Referee: ([[]])

9 September 2006 5	Asante Kotoko (Ghana)	2–1	(Algeria) JS Kabylie	Kumasi
	Amofah 38', 75'		Yacef 3'	Stadium: Baba Yara Stadium; Referee: ([[]])

17 September 2006 6	JS Kabylie (Algeria)	2–2	(Egypt) Al Ahly	Algiers
	Dabo 64', 82' (pen.)		Aboutrika 14', 90+6' (pen.)	Stadium: Stade du 5 Juillet; Referee: Mohamed Guezzaz (Morocco)

== 2007 Champions League ==
=== Preliminary round ===
26 January 2007 First leg	JS Kabylie (Algeria)	3–1	(Guinea-Bissau) CF Os Balantas	Tizi Ouzou
--:-- UTC+1	Oussalah 10'; Saïbi 40', 50'			Stadium: Stade 1er Novembre 1954; Referee: Yasser Abdel Raouf (Egypt)

10 February 2007 Second leg	CF Os Balantas (Guinea-Bissau)	1–2 (2–5 agg.)	(Algeria) JS Kabylie	Bissau
--:-- UTC+1			Dabo 3', 83'	Stadium: Estádio 24 de Setembro; Referee: Mamadou Kaba (Mali)

=== First round ===
4 March 2007 First leg	AS Mangasport (Gabon)	3–1	(Algeria) JS Kabylie	Moanda
--:-- UTC+1			Dabo 57'	Stadium: Stade Henri Sylvoz; Referee: ([[]])

16 March 2007 Second leg	JS Kabylie (Algeria)	3–0 (4–3 agg.)	(Gabon) AS Mangasport	Tizi Ouzou
--:-- UTC+1	Yacef 1'; Dabo 58'; Hemani 85'			Stadium: Stade 1er Novembre 1954; Referee: Abdellah El Achiri (Morocco)

=== Second round ===
8 April 2007 First leg	Coton Sport FC (Cameroon)	1–0	(Algeria) JS Kabylie	Garoua
--:-- UTC+1	Litsingi 45' (pen.)			Stadium: Roumdé Adjia Stadium; Referee: Alex Kotey (Ghana)

20 April 2007 Second leg	JS Kabylie (Algeria)	2–0 (2–1 agg.)	(Cameroon) Coton Sport FC	Tizi Ouzou
--:-- UTC+1	Dabo 65'; Hamlaoui 90'			Stadium: Stade 1er Novembre 1954; Referee: Mohamed Guezzaz (Morocco)

=== Group stage ===
==== Group A ====
Pos	Team	Pld	W	D	L	GF	GA	GD	Pts	Qualification	ESS	ITT	JSK	FAR
1	(Tunisia) Étoile du Sahel	6	3	2	1	6	2	+4	11	Advance to knockout stage	—	0–0	3–0	0–0
2	(Libya) Al-Ittihad	6	3	1	2	6	4	+2	10	Advance to knockout stage	2–0	—	1–0	2–0
3	(Algeria) JS Kabylie	6	2	1	3	6	8	−2	7		0–2	3–1	—	2–0
4	(Morocco) FAR Rabat	6	1	2	3	2	6	−4	5		0–1	1–0	1–1	—

Source: CAF

22 June 2007 1	Al-Ittihad (Libya)	1–0	(Algeria) JS Kabylie	Tripoli
21:00 EET	Camara 83'			Stadium: June 11 Stadium; Referee: Modou Sowe (Gambia)

6 July 2007 2	JS Kabylie (Algeria)	2–0	(Morocco) FAR Rabat	Tizi Ouzou
20:00 CET	Dabo 29' (pen.), 44'			Stadium: Stade 1er Novembre; Referee: Coffi Codjia (Benin)

== Squad information ==
=== Playing statistics ===
No.	Pos	Nat	Player	Total		National 1		Algerian Cup		Super Cup		Champions League	
No.	Pos	Nat	Player	Apps	Goals	Apps	Goals	Apps	Goals	Apps	Goals	Apps	Goals
13	GK	(Algeria) ALG	Mourad Berrefane	1	0	1	0	0	0	0	0	0	0
26	GK	(Algeria) ALG	Faouzi Chaouchi	37	0	23	0	3	0	1	0	10	0
12	GK	(Algeria) ALG	Nabil Mazari	1	0	0	0	1	0	0	0	0	0
3	DF	(Algeria) ALG	Brahim Zafour	39	0	23	0	3	0	1	0	12	0
17	DF	(Libya) LBY	Omar Daoud	12	0	8	0	0	0	0	0	4	0
32	DF	(Mali) MLI	Demba Barry	19	1	9	1	3	0	0	0	7	0
4	DF	(Algeria) ALG	Mohamed Aït Kaci	5	0	5	0	0	0	0	0	0	0
	DF	(Algeria) ALG	Rahim Meftah	34	1	21	0	3	1	1	0	9	0
5	DF	(Algeria) ALG	Sofiane Harkat	36	1	23	0	3	1	1	0	9	0
30	DF	(Algeria) ALG	Mohamed Rabie Meftah	39	1	24	1	2	0	1	0	12	0
	DF	(Algeria) ALG	Mohamed Yahi	1	0	1	0	0	0	0	0	0	0
24	DF	(Algeria) ALG	Nassim Oussalah	35	4	20	3	4	0	0	0	11	1
23	DF	(Algeria) ALG	Sofiane Bengoureïne	22	0	12	0	3	0	0	0	7	0
19	DF	(Algeria) ALG	Samir Djouder	15	0	9	0	0	0	0	0	6	0
18	MF	(Algeria) ALG	Lamara Douicher	40	1	23	0	4	0	1	1	12	0
6	MF	(Algeria) ALG	Nassim Hamlaoui	40	2	26	1	2	0	1	0	11	1
8	MF	(Algeria) ALG	Chérif Abdeslam	36	1	26	0	3	1	1	0	6	0
25	MF	(Algeria) ALG	Fahem Ouslati	13	1	8	1	1	0	1	0	3	0
	MF	(Algeria) ALG	Abderrahmane Boukhari	1	0	1	0	0	0	0	0	0	0
12	MF	(Algeria) ALG	Kamel Marek	16	0	7	0	2	0	0	0	7	0
17	MF	(Algeria) ALG	Ali Bendebka	15	0	8	0	3	0	0	0	4	0
14	FW	(Algeria) ALG	Boubeker Athmani	22	1	16	1	2	0	1	0	3	0
27	FW	(Benin) BEN	Wassiou Oladipupo	41	0	26	0	1	0	1	0	13	0
7	FW	(Algeria) ALG	Hamza Yacef	38	4	26	2	3	0	0	0	9	2
29	FW	(Mali) MLI	Cheick Oumar Dabo	42	27	26	17	2	1	0	0	14	9
11	FW	(Algeria) ALG	Nabil Hemani	37	9	21	3	3	4	1	0	12	2
9	FW	(Algeria) ALG	Youcef Saïbi	20	4	7	1	3	1	1	0	9	2
16	FW	(Algeria) ALG	Mohamed Derrag	6	0	3	0	1	0	0	0	2	0
	FW	(Algeria) ALG	Ramzi Bourakba	1	2	1	2	0	0	0	0	0	0
Players transferred out during the season
1	GK	(Algeria) ALG	Lounes Gaouaoui	12	0	7	0	0	0	0	0	5	0
23	DF	(Algeria) ALG	Anwar Boudjakdji	14	0	9	0	0	0	1	0	4	0

Last updated: 13 November 2020

=== Goalscorers ===
Includes all competitive matches. The list is sorted alphabetically by surname when total goals are equal.

No.	Nat.	Player	Pos.	L 1	AC	SC	CL 1	TOTAL
29	(Mali)	Cheick Oumar Dabo	FW	17	1	0	9	27
11	(Algeria)	Nabil Hemani	FW	3	4	0	2	9
7	(Algeria)	Hamza Yacef	FW	2	0	0	2	4
24	(Algeria)	Nassim Oussalah	DF	3	0	0	1	4
9	(Algeria)	Youcef Saïbi	FW	1	1	0	2	4
6	(Algeria)	Nassim Hamlaoui	MF	1	0	0	1	2
	(Algeria)	Ramzi Bourakba	FW	2	0	0	0	2
32	(Mali)	Demba Barry	DF	0	0	0	0	1
5	(Algeria)	Sofiane Harkat	DF	0	1	0	0	1
30	(Algeria)	Mohamed Rabie Meftah	DF	0	0	0	0	1
8	(Algeria)	Chérif Abdeslam	MF	0	1	0	0	1
25	(Algeria)	Fahem Ouslati	MF	1	0	0	0	1
14	(Algeria)	Boubeker Athmani	FW	1	0	0	0	1
3	(Algeria)	Brahim Zafour	MF	0	1	0	0	1
	(Algeria)	Rahim Meftah	MF	0	1	0	0	1
18	(Algeria)	Lamara Douicher	MF	0	0	1	0	1
Own Goals				0	0	0	0	0
Totals				33	10	1	17	61

== Transfers ==
=== In ===
Date	Pos	Player	From club	Transfer fee	Source
1 July 2007	FW	(Mali) Cheick Oumar Dabo	(Mali) Centre Salif Keita	Undisclosed	

=== Out ===
Date	Pos	Player	To club	Transfer fee	Source
1 January 2007	DF	(Algeria) Anwar Boudjakdji	WA Tlemcen	Undisclosed	
10 January 2007	GK	(Algeria) Lounes Gaouaoui	WA Tlemcen	Undisclosed	
