= 2004–05 JS Kabylie season =

JS Kabylie
2004–05 season
- President: Mohand Chérif Hannachi
- Head Coach: Moussa Saïb; Christian Coste (from 6 February 2006)
- Stadium: Stade du 1^{er} Novembre 1954
- National 1: Runners-up
- Algerian Cup: Round of 64
- CAF Champions League: Second round
- Top goalscorer: League: Hamid Berguiga (18 goals); All: Hamid Berguiga (18 goals)

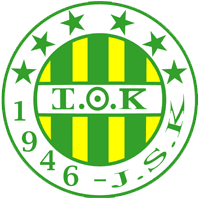
JS Kabylie Logo

The 2004–05 season was JS Kabylie's 40th season in the Algerian top flight. They competed in National 1, the Algerian Cup and the Champions League.

== Squad list ==
Players and squad numbers last updated on 25 September 2005.
Note: Flags indicate national team as has been defined under FIFA eligibility rules. Players may hold more than one non-FIFA nationality.

No.	Nat.	Position	Name	Date of Birth (Age)	Signed from
Goalkeepers
1	(Algeria)	GK	Lounes Gaouaoui	28 September 1977 (aged 27)	(Algeria) USM Drâa Ben Khedda
30	(Algeria)	GK	Nabil Mazari	18 February 1984 (aged 20)	(Algeria) Youth system
	(Algeria)	GK	Mourad Berrefane	18 March 1986 (aged 18)	(Algeria) Youth system
12	(Algeria)	GK	Mohamed Seghir Ferradji	22 August 1975 (aged 29)	(Algeria) OMR El Annasser
Defenders
3	(Algeria)		Abdelaziz Benhamlat	22 March 1974 (aged 30)	(Algeria) MC Alger
19	(Algeria)		Samir Djouder	29 March 1981 (aged 23)	(Algeria) ?
	(Algeria)	RB	Mohamed Rabie Meftah	5 May 1985 (aged 19)	(Algeria) Youth system
20	(Algeria)	CB	Rahim Meftah	15 August 1980 (aged 24)	(Algeria) Youth system
23	(Algeria)	CB	Anwar Boudjakdji	1 September 1976 (aged 28)	(Algeria) CR Belouizdad
22	(Algeria)	CB	Noureddine Drioueche	27 October 1973 (aged 31)	(Qatar) Al-Arabi SC
4	(Algeria)	CB	Kamel Habri	5 March 1976 (aged 28)	(Algeria) JSM Bejaïa
2	(Algeria)	RB	Slimane Raho	20 October 1975 (aged 29)	(Algeria) MC Oran
15	(Algeria)	CB	Samir Zazou	24 March 1980 (aged 24)	(Algeria) CR Belouizdad
5	(Algeria)	CB	Brahim Zafour	30 November 1977 (aged 27)	(Algeria) Youth system
Midfielders
18	(Algeria)	DM	Lamara Douicher	10 March 1980 (aged 24)	(Algeria) NR Béni Douala
7	(Algeria)	DM	Nassim Hamlaoui	25 February 1981 (aged 23)	(Algeria) Youth system
10	(Algeria)	DM	Reda Benhadj Djillali	31 May 1978 (aged 26)	(Algeria) ASO Chlef
8	(Algeria)	DM	Lounés Bendahmane	3 April 1977 (aged 27)	(Algeria) JS Bordj Ménaïel
21	(Algeria)		Hakim Boubrit	9 August 1974 (aged 30)	(Algeria) Youth system
17	(Algeria)		Abdelkrim Doudène	25 October 1972 (aged 32)	(Algeria) JS Bordj Ménaïel
26	(Algeria)	AM	Brahim Arafat Mezouar	18 December 1973 (aged 31)	(United Arab Emirates) Dubai CSC
6	(Algeria)	DM	Farouk Belkaïd	14 November 1977 (aged 27)	(Algeria) JS Bordj Ménaïel
Forwards
28	(Algeria)		Bouabdellah Daoud	3 February 1978 (aged 26)	(Tunisia) Espérance de Tunis
9	(Republic of the Congo)		Wilfried Urbain Elvis Endzanga	28 March 1980 (aged 24)	(Cameroon) Coton Sport
16	(Algeria)		Hamid Berguiga	25 April 1974 (aged 30)	(Algeria) USM El Harrach
14	(Algeria)		Mohand Larbi	9 April 1982 (aged 22)	(Algeria) Youth system
11	(Algeria)		Fawzi Moussouni	8 April 1972 (aged 32)	(Algeria) JS El Biar
	(Algeria)		Moncef Ouichaoui	5 April 1977 (aged 27)	(Algeria) USM Alger
27	(Liberia)		Sessay Roberts	1 December 1979 (aged 25)	(Cameroon) Coton Sport
24	(Algeria)		Takfarinas Douicher	29 April 1983 (aged 21)	(Algeria) Youth system

== Competitions ==
=== Overview ===
Competition	Record								Started round	Final position / round	First match	Last match
Competition	G	W	D	L	GF	GA	GD	Win %	Started round	Final position / round	First match	Last match
National 1	30	16	6	8	44	22	+22	53.33	—	Runners-up	20 August 2004	13 June 2005
Algerian Cup	1	0	0	1	0	1	−1	0.00	Round of 64		7 January 2005	
2005 Champions League	2	0	1	1	0	1	−1	0.00	First round		6 March 2005	18 March 2005
Total	33	16	7	10	44	24	+20	48.48				

Updated to match played 3 June 2019
Source: Competitions

=== National 1 ===
==== League table ====
Pos	Team	Pld	W	D	L	GF	GA	GD	Pts	Qualification or relegation
1	USM Alger (C)	30	21	4	5	55	27	+28	67	Qualification for the 2006 CAF Champions League
2	JS Kabylie	30	16	6	8	44	22	+22	54	Qualification for the 2006 CAF Champions League
3	MC Alger	30	14	7	9	39	44	−5	49	Qualification for the 2005–06 Arab Champions League
4	NA Hussein Dey	30	11	10	9	29	19	+10	43	Qualification for the 2006 CAF Confederation Cup
5	CA Bordj Bou Arreridj	30	10	13	7	32	25	+7	43	Qualification for the 2005–06 Arab Champions League

Updated to match(es) played on 13 June 2005. Source: DZFoot
Rules for classification: 1) points; 2) head-to-head points; 3) head-to-head goal difference; 4) goal difference; 5) total goals; 6) fairplay ranking; 7) playoff.
(C) Champions

==== Results summary ====
Overall								Home						Away					
Pld	W	D	L	GF	GA	GD	Pts	W	D	L	GF	GA	GD	W	D	L	GF	GA	GD
30	16	6	8	44	22	+22	54	13	2	0	32	4	+28	3	4	8	12	18	−6

Last updated: 22 April 2018.
Source: Competitive matches

==== Results by round ====
Round	1	2	3	4	5	6	7	8	9	10	11	12	13	14	15	16	17	18	19	20	21	22	23	24	25	26	27	28	29	30
Ground	A	H	A	H	A	H	A	H	A	A	H	A	H	A	H	H	A	H	A	H	A	H	A	H	H	A	H	A	H	A
Result	D	W	L	W	D	W	D	W	L	W	W	W	W	L	W	W	L	D	L	W	D	W	W	W	D	L	W	L	W	L
Position																														

Updated to match(es) played on 10 April 2021. Source: Competitive matches
A = Away; H = Home; W = Win; D = Draw; L = Loss

=== Matches ===
Win Draw Loss

20 August 2004 Round 1	ASO Chlef	1–1	JS Kabylie	Chlef
	Belahouel 42'		Belkaïd 51'	Stadium: Stade Mohamed Boumezrag; Referee: Kamel Berber

26 August 2004 Round 2	JS Kabylie	1–0	USM Blida	Tizi Ouzou
	Boudjakdji 45'			Stadium: Stade 1er Novembre 1954; Referee: Mohamed Zekrini

9 September 2004 Round 3	NA Hussein Dey	1–0	JS Kabylie	Hussein Dey
	Bendebka 72'	Report		Stadium: Zioui Brothers Stadium; Referee: Mohamed Benouza

16 September 2004 Round 4	JS Kabylie	2–1	USM Alger	Tizi Ouzou
	Zazou (yellow card) 11' (yellow-red card) 74'; Endzanga 17' (red card) 40'; Berguiga 56'; Habri (yellow card) 65'; Raho (yellow card) 85'	Report	Meftah (yellow card) 33'; Achiou (yellow card) 43'; Besseghir 90+2'	Stadium: Stade 1er Novembre 1954; Referee: Touati Djaballah

20 September 2004 Round 5	OMR El Annasser	1–1	JS Kabylie	Belouizdad
	Hemani 55'		Boudjakdji 90+2'	Stadium: Stade 20 Août 1955; Referee: Belkacem Boumaza

30 September 2004 Round 6	JS Kabylie	2–0	CA Bordj Bou Arreridj	Tizi Ouzou
	Berguiga 44'; Benhadj Djillali 73'	Report		Stadium: Stade 1er Novembre 1954; Referee: Houari Belkacem

14 October 2004 Round 7	CS Constantine	1–1	JS Kabylie	Constantine
	Ouchem 5'	Report	Zafour 62'	Stadium: Stade Mohamed Hamlaoui; Referee: Djamel Haimoudi

21 October 2004 Round 8	JS Kabylie	3–0	US Chaouia	Tizi Ouzou
	Berguiga 9', 23'; Sessay 90'			Stadium: Stade 1er Novembre 1954; Referee: Mustapha Boumediene Mansouri

28 October 2004 Round 9	MC Oran	2–1	JS Kabylie	Oran
	Daoud 10' (pen.); Berradja 90'	Report	Belkaid 23'	Stadium: Habib Bouakeul Stadium; Referee: Mohamed Khelifi

4 November 2004 Round 10	USM Annaba	0–2	JS Kabylie	Annaba
		Report	Berguiga 42'; Ouichaoui 90'	Stadium: Stade Abdelkader Chabou; Referee: Karim Mazraoui

12 November 2004 Round 11	JS Kabylie	6–1	MC Alger	Tizi Ouzou
	Belkaid 16'; Endzanga 40'; Berguiga 45', 73' (pen.); Zafour 54'; Benhadj Djillali 86'	Report	Chaouch 51'	Stadium: Stade 1er Novembre 1954; Referee: Mohamed Benouza

25 November 2004 Round 12	CR Belouizdad	0–1	JS Kabylie	Belouizdad
			Berguiga 40'	Stadium: Stade 20 Août 1955; Referee: Mohamed Kestali

3 December 2004 Round 13	JS Kabylie	2–0	WA Tlemcen	Tizi Ouzou
	Zafour 75'; Benhadj Djillali 80'	Report		Stadium: Stade 1er Novembre 1954; Referee: Farouk Ouchène

9 December 2004 Round 14	GC Mascara	1–0	JS Kabylie	Mascara
	Zouggach 55'	Report		Stadium: Stade de l'Unité Africaine; Referee: Mohamed Khelifi

16 December 2004 Round 15	JS Kabylie	1–0	ES Sétif	Tizi Ouzou
	Zafour 55'	Report		Stadium: Stade 1er Novembre 1954; Referee: Mohamed Benouza

13 January 2005 Round 16	JS Kabylie	3–0	ASO Chlef	Tizi Ouzou
	Berguiga 26', 30'; Endzanga 54'	Report		Stadium: Stade 1er Novembre 1954; Referee: Belkacem Boumaza

17 January 2005 Round 17	USM Blida	2–1	JS Kabylie	Blida
	Zouani 39'; Ghoul 76' (pen.)		Khenisfi 51' (o.g.)	Stadium: Stade Mustapha Tchaker; Referee: Houari Belkacem

31 January 2005 Round 18	JS Kabylie	0–0	NA Hussein Dey	Tizi Ouzou
				Stadium: Stade 1er Novembre 1954; Referee: Touati Djaballah

28 February 2005 Round 19	USM Alger	2–1	JS Kabylie	Bologhine
	Djahnine 13'; Eneramo 42'	Report	Belkaïd 74' (pen.)	Stadium: Omar Hamadi Stadium; Referee: Mohamed Benouza

17 February 2005 Round 20	JS Kabylie	1–0	OMR El Annasser	Tizi Ouzou
	Belkaid 28'			Stadium: Stade 1er Novembre 1954; Referee: Mohamed Kestali

24 February 2005 Round 21	CA Bordj Bou Arreridj	0–0	JS Kabylie	Bordj Bou Arréridj
				Stadium: Stade 20 Août 1955; Referee: Mohamed Kestali

10 March 2005 Round 22	JS Kabylie	4–1	CS Constantine	Tizi Ouzou
	Berguiga 10', 28', 80' (pen.); Endzanga 35'	Report	Guehche 41'	Stadium: Stade 1er Novembre 1954; Referee: Mustapha Boumediene Mansouri

31 March 2005 Round 23	US Chaouia	0–1	JS Kabylie	Oum El Bouaghi
			Berguiga 63'	Stadium: Stade Zerdani Hsouma; Referee: Belkacem Boumaza

14 April 2005 Round 24	JS Kabylie	1–0	MC Oran	Tizi Ouzou
	Endzanga 15'	Report		Stadium: Stade 1er Novembre 1954; Referee: Abdelhamid Aouiti

18 April 2005 Round 25	JS Kabylie	0–0	USM Annaba	Tizi Ouzou
		Report		Stadium: Stade 1er Novembre 1954; Referee: Fouad Djerboua

16 May 2005 Round 26	MC Alger	2–1	JS Kabylie	Algiers
	Ouahid 41'; Deham 48'		Endzanga 3'	Stadium: Stade 5 Juillet 1962; Attendance: 0 (close doors); Referee: Mustapha Ferradi

26 May 2005 Round 27	JS Kabylie	3–0	CR Belouizdad	Tizi Ouzou
	Daoud 5'; Berguiga 73', 85'	Report		Stadium: Stade 1er Novembre 1954; Attendance: 0 (close doors); Referee: Rabah Boukedjar

2 June 2005 Round 28	WA Tlemcen	3–1	JS Kabylie	Tlemcen
	Dahleb 36'; Olawale 75'; Boulaincer 83'		Berguiga 89'	Stadium: Stade des 3 Frères Zerga; Referee: Abdelkader Abed

9 June 2005 Round 29	JS Kabylie	3–1	GC Mascara	Tizi Ouzou
	Berguiga 35'; Boudjakdji 85'; Daoud 90'		Saïhi 27'	Stadium: Stade 1er Novembre 1954; Referee: Mohamed Amine Benaissa

13 June 2005 Round 30	ES Sétif	2–0	JS Kabylie	Sétif
	Achacha 2'; Fellahi 3'			Stadium: Stade 8 Mai 1945; Referee: Rachid Gasmi

== Algerian Cup ==
7 January 2005 Round of 64	JS Kabylie	0–1	CR Belouizdad
Note: Lineup for JS Kabylie - .

== Champions League ==
=== First round ===
6 March 2005 First leg	Fello Star (Guinea)	1–0	(Algeria) JS Kabylie	Conakry, Guinea
	Correia 74'			Stadium: Stade du 28 Septembre

18 March 2005 Second leg	JS Kabylie (Algeria)	0–0	(Guinea) Fello Star	Tizi Ouzou, Algeria
		Report		Stadium: Stade 1er Novembre 1954; Referee: Abdelali Naciri (Morocco)

== Squad information ==
=== Playing statistics ===
No.	Pos	Nat	Player	Total		National 1		Algerian Cup		Champions League	
No.	Pos	Nat	Player	Apps	Goals	Apps	Goals	Apps	Goals	Apps	Goals
1	GK	(Algeria) ALG	Lounes Gaouaoui	24	0	22	0	0	0	2	0
	GK	(Algeria) ALG	Mourad Berrefane	1	0	1	0	0	0	0	0
30	GK	(Algeria) ALG	Nabil Mazari	4	0	4	0	0	0	0	0
12	GK	(Algeria) ALG	Mohamed Seghir Ferradji	3	0	3	0	0	0	0	0
5	DF	(Algeria) ALG	Brahim Zafour	23	4	23	4	0	0	0	0
22	DF	(Algeria) ALG	Noureddine Drioueche	22	0	21	0	0	0	1	0
20	DF	(Algeria) ALG	Rahim Meftah	9	0	9	0	0	0	0	0
4	DF	(Algeria) ALG	Kamel Habri	29	0	27	0	0	0	2	0
23	DF	(Algeria) ALG	Anwar Boudjakdji	26	3	24	3	0	0	2	0
2	DF	(Algeria) ALG	Slimane Raho	26	0	24	0	0	0	2	0
	DF	(Algeria) ALG	Mohamed Rabie Meftah	7	0	5	0	0	0	2	0
15	DF	(Algeria) ALG	Samir Zazou	26	0	24	0	0	0	2	0
3	DF	(Algeria) ALG	Abdelaziz Benhamlat	2	0	2	0	0	0	0	0
19	DF	(Algeria) ALG	Samir Djouder	12	0	11	0	0	0	1	0
18	MF	(Algeria) ALG	Lamara Douicher	16	0	15	0	0	0	1	0
7	MF	(Algeria) ALG	Nassim Hamlaoui	12	0	12	0	0	0	0	0
10	MF	(Algeria) ALG	Reda Benhadj Djillali	22	3	21	3	0	0	1	0
8	MF	(Algeria) ALG	Lounés Bendahmane	23	0	21	0	0	0	2	0
21	MF	(Algeria) ALG	Hakim Boubrit	1	0	1	0	0	0	0	0
17	MF	(Algeria) ALG	Abdelkrim Doudene	14	0	13	0	0	0	1	0
26	MF	(Algeria) ALG	Brahim Arafat Mezouar	5	0	5	0	0	0	0	0
6	MF	(Algeria) ALG	Farouk Belkaïd	24	5	24	5	0	0	0	0
28	FW	(Algeria) ALG	Bouabdellah Daoud	9	2	8	2	0	0	1	0
9	FW	(Republic of the Congo) CGO	Wilfried Urbain Elvis Endzanga	25	6	23	6	0	0	2	0
11	FW	(Algeria) ALG	Fawzi Moussouni	4	0	3	0	0	0	1	0
	FW	(Algeria) ALG	Moncef Ouichaoui	11	1	11	1	0	0	0	0
16	FW	(Algeria) ALG	Hamid Berguiga	32	18	30	18	0	0	2	0
27	FW	(Liberia) LBR	Sessay Roberts	21	0	21	0	0	0	0	0
24	FW	(Algeria) ALG	Takfarinas Douicher	3	0	2	0	0	0	1	0
14	FW	(Algeria) ALG	Mohand Larbi	7	0	6	0	0	0	1	0
Players transferred out during the season

Last updated: 13 November 2020

=== Goalscorers ===
Includes all competitive matches. The list is sorted alphabetically by surname when total goals are equal.

No.	Nat.	Player	Pos.	L 1	AC	CL 1	TOTAL
16	(Algeria)	Hamid Berguiga	FW	18	0	0	18
9	(Republic of the Congo)	Wilfried Urbain Elvis Endzanga	FW	6	0	0	6
6	(Algeria)	Farouk Belkaïd	MF	5	0	0	5
5	(Algeria)	Brahim Zafour	DF	4	0	0	4
10	(Algeria)	Reda Benhadj Djillali	MF	3	0	0	3
23	(Algeria)	Anwar Boudjakdji	DF	3	0	0	3
28	(Algeria)	Bouabdellah Daoud	FW	2	0	0	2
	(Algeria)	Moncef Ouichaoui	FW	1	0	0	1
Own Goals				1	0	0	1
Totals				44	0	0	44

== Transfers ==
=== In ===
Date	Pos	Player	From club	Transfer fee	Source
1 July 2004	DF	(Algeria) Abdelaziz Benhamlat	MC Alger	Undisclosed	
1 July 2004	DF	(Algeria) Noureddine Drioueche	(Qatar) Al-Arabi SC	Undisclosed	
1 July 2004	DF	(Algeria) Anwar Boudjakdji	CR Belouizdad	Undisclosed	
1 July 2004	DF	(Algeria) Samir Zazou	CR Belouizdad	Undisclosed	
1 July 2004	MF	(Algeria) Reda Benhadj Djillali	ASO Chlef	Undisclosed	
1 July 2004	MF	(Algeria) Brahim Arafat Mezouar	(United Arab Emirates) Dubai CSC	Undisclosed	
1 July 2004	FW	(Algeria) Moncef Ouichaoui	USM Alger	Undisclosed	
28 December 2004	FW	(Algeria) Bouabdellah Daoud	(Tunisia) Espérance de Tunis	Undisclosed	
1 January 2005	FW	(Algeria) Fawzi Moussouni	JS El Biar	Undisclosed	
