= 2002–03 JS Kabylie season =

JS Kabylie
2002–03 season
- President: Mohand Chérif Hannachi
- Head Coach: Jean-Yves Chay
- Stadium: Stade du 1^{er} Novembre 1954; Stade Djillali Bounâama; Stade du 5 Juillet
- National 1: 4th
- Algerian Cup: Quarter-finals
- CAF Cup: 2002: Winners; 2003: Second round
- Top goalscorer: League: Farouk Belkaid (8 goals); All: Farouk Belkaid (9 goals)

The 2002–03 season is JS Kabylie's 38th season in the Algerian top flight, They will be competing in National 1, the Algerian Cup and the CAF Cup.

== Squad list ==
Players and squad numbers last updated on 1 September 2002.
Note: Flags indicate national team as has been defined under FIFA eligibility rules. Players may hold more than one non-FIFA nationality.

No.	Nat.	Position	Name	Date of Birth (Age)	Signed from
Goalkeepers
1	(Algeria)	GK	Lounès Gaouaoui	28 September 1977 (aged 25)	(Algeria) USM Drâa Ben Khedda
	(Algeria)	GK	Liamine Bougherara	1 December 1971 (aged 31)	(Algeria)
Defenders
5	(Algeria)	CB	Brahim Zafour	30 November 1977 (aged 25)	(Algeria) Youth system
	(Algeria)	LB	Abdelaziz Benhamlat	22 March 1974 (aged 28)	(Algeria) RC Kouba
22	(Algeria)	CB	Noureddine Drioueche	27 October 1973 (aged 29)	(Algeria) JS Bordj Ménaïel
2	(Algeria)	RB	Slimane Raho	20 October 1975 (aged 27)	(Algeria) MC Oran
15	(Algeria)		Said Besseghir	8 September 1980 (aged 22)	(Algeria) ?
19	(Algeria)		Samir Djouder	29 March 1981 (aged 21)	(Algeria) ?
20	(Algeria)	CB	Rahim Meftah	15 August 1980 (aged 22)	(Algeria) Youth system
Midfielders
6	(Algeria)	DM	Farouk Belkaïd	14 November 1977 (aged 25)	(Algeria) JS Bordj Ménaïel
13	(Algeria)	DM	Lounés Bendahmane	3 April 1977 (aged 25)	(Algeria) JS Bordj Ménaïel
7	(Algeria)		Nassim Hamlaoui	25 February 1981 (aged 21)	(Algeria) Youth system
17	(Algeria)		Abdelkrim Doudène	25 October 1972 (aged 30)	(Algeria) JS Bordj Ménaïel
	(Algeria)	RW / CF / LW	Yacine Amaouche	26 June 1979 (aged 23)	(Algeria) JSM Béjaïa
8	(Algeria)	AM	Moussa Saïb	6 March 1969 (aged 33)	(United Arab Emirates) Dubai CSC
21	(Algeria)		Hakim Boubrit	9 August 1974 (aged 28)	(Algeria) ?
	(Algeria)		Nacer Mohamed Medjoudj	8 July 1977 (aged 25)	(Algeria) ?
	(Algeria)		Mohamed Maghraoui	30 October 1976 (aged 26)	(Algeria) ?
	(Algeria)		Rabie Dilmi	5 March 1977 (aged 25)	(Algeria) ?
Forwards
	(Algeria)		Mounir Dob	1 February 1974 (aged 28)	(Algeria) CA Batna
16	(Algeria)		Hamid Berguiga	25 April 1974 (aged 28)	(Algeria) USM El Harrach
	(Algeria)	CF / ST	Farid Ghazi	16 March 1974 (aged 28)	(France) Troyes AC
	(Algeria)	CF	Noureddine Daham	15 November 1977 (aged 25)	(Algeria) ASM Oran
	(Algeria)		Fodhil Dob	22 October 1975 (aged 27)	(Algeria) MC Alger
	(Algeria)		Hocine Hammoudi	6 April 1978 (aged 24)	(Algeria) ?
14	(Algeria)		Mohand Larbi	9 April 1982 (aged 20)	(Algeria) ?
24	(Algeria)		Takfarinas Douicher	29 April 1983 (aged 19)	(Algeria) NA Hussein Dey

== Competitions ==
=== Overview ===
Competition	Record								Started round	Final position / round	First match	Last match
Competition	G	W	D	L	GF	GA	GD	Win %	Started round	Final position / round	First match	Last match
National	30	13	10	7	38	24	+14	43.33	—	4th	22 August 2002	12 May 2003
Algerian Cup	4	3	0	1	8	3	+5	75.00	Round of 64	Quarter-finals	2 March 2003	17 April 2003
2002 CAF Cup	6	3	1	2	8	3	+5	50.00	Quarter-finals	Finals		24 November 2002
2003 CAF Cup	2	0	2	0	1	1	+0	0.00	Second round		17 May 2003	30 May 2003
Total	42	19	13	10	55	31	+24	45.24				

Updated to match played 3 June 2019
Source: Competitions

=== National ===
==== League table ====
Pos	Team	Pld	W	D	L	GF	GA	GD	Pts	Qualification or relegation
2	USM Blida	30	14	9	7	32	22	+10	51	2003-04 Arab Champions League
3	NA Hussein Dey	30	13	12	5	32	24	+8	51	2003-04 Arab Champions League
4	JS Kabylie	30	13	10	7	38	24	+14	49	
5	CR Belouizdad	30	12	9	9	28	20	+8	44 (Note: 1 point deducted)	2004 CAF Confederation Cup
6	MC Oran	30	11	10	9	41	40	+1	43	2003-04 Arab Champions League

Updated to match(es) played on May 2014. Source: DZFoot
Rules for classification: 1) points; 2) goal difference; 3) number of goals scored.

==== Results summary ====
Overall								Home						Away					
Pld	W	D	L	GF	GA	GD	Pts	W	D	L	GF	GA	GD	W	D	L	GF	GA	GD
30	13	10	7	38	24	+14	49	9	3	3	26	11	+15	4	7	4	12	13	−1

Last updated: 22 April 2018.
Source: Competitive matches

==== Results by round ====
Round	1	2	3	4	5	6	7	8	9	10	11	12	13	14	15	16	17	18	19	20	21	22	23	24	25	26	27	28	29	30
Ground	A	H	A	H	A	H	A	H	A	A	H	A	H	A	H	H	A	H	A	H	A	H	A	H	H	A	H	A	H	A
Result	W	D	D	W	D	L	L	L	L	W	W	L	L	D	W	W	D	W	D	D	D	W	W	L	D	L	W	W	W	D
Position	4	2	4	2	3	2	4	6	6	6	5	6	8	8	8	6	7	5	5	5	6	4	3	4	4	4	3	2	2	4

Source: Competitive matches
A = Away; H = Home; W = Win; D = Draw; L = Loss

==== Matches ====
Win Draw Loss

22 August 2002 Round 1	WA Tlemcen	1–2	JS Kabylie	Tlemcen
	Hadjou 86'		Raho 3'; Amaouche 78'	Stadium: Stade Akid Lotfi; Referee: Mohamed Amine Benaissa

30 August 2002 Round 2	JS Kabylie	2–2	USM Annaba	Boumerdès
	Maghraoui 8'; Belkaid 39'		Amaouche 16'; Bensaïd 78'	Stadium: Stade Djillali Bounâama; Referee: Mohamed Benouza

12 September 2002 Round 3	MO Constantine	1–1	JS Kabylie	Constantine
	Azizane 52'		Mounir Dob 40'	Stadium: Ramadan Ben-Abdelmalek Stadium; Referee: Touati Djaballah

20 September 2002 Round 4	JS Kabylie	6–1	ASM Oran	Boumerdès
	Bendahmane 8', 25'; Mounir Dob 63', 86'; Amaouche 83'; Fodhil Dob 85'		Begga 66'	Stadium: Stade Djillali Bounâama; Referee: Smail Ounès

28 October 2002 Round 5	NA Hussein Dey	2–2	JS Kabylie	Hussein Dey
	Yacef 45'; Bentayeb 72'		Belkaid 45', 75'	Stadium: Stade Frères Zioui; Referee: Kamel Berber

14 October 2002 Round 6	JS Kabylie	1–0	ES Sétif	Boumerdès
	Bendahmane 50'			Stadium: Stade Djillali Bounâama; Referee: Mohamed Haddada

30 November 2002 Round 7	USM Blida	2–0	JS Kabylie	Blida
	Khazrouni 11'; Billal Zouani 58'	Report		Stadium: Stade Mustapha Tchaker; Referee: Mehdi Abdi

25 October 2002 Round 8	JS Kabylie	0–1	JSM Béjaïa	Boumerdès
		Report	Benaceur 49'	Stadium: Stade Djillali Bounâama; Referee: Mohamed Bichari

31 October 2002 Round 9	CR Belouizdad	1–0	JS Kabylie	Algiers
	Boudjakdji 45'	Report		Stadium: Stade 20 Août 1955; Referee: Mohamed Zekrini

3 December 2002 Round 10	CA Bordj Bou Arreridj	0–1	JS Kabylie	Bordj Bou Arreridj
			Amaouche 63'	Stadium: Stade 20 Août 1955; Attendance: 0 (close doors); Referee: Chawki Mouellef

14 November 2002 Round 11	JS Kabylie	1–0	USM Alger	Tizi Ouzou
	Amaouche 86'	Report		Stadium: Stade du 1er Novembre 1954; Referee: Djamel Haimoudi

16 December 2002 Round 12	RC Kouba	2–1	JS Kabylie	Kouba
	Zmit 50'; Khelfouni 90+1'		Belkaid 52'	Stadium: Stade Omar Benhaddad; Referee: Mohamed Amine Belhacène

10 December 2002 Round 13	JS Kabylie	0–1	MC Oran	Tizi Ouzou
			Daoud 90+2'	Stadium: Stade du 1er Novembre 1954; Referee: Kamel Berber

14 December 2002 Round 14	CA Batna	0–0	JS Kabylie	Batna
		Report		Stadium: Mustapha Seffouhi Stadium; Referee: Mohamed Amine Benaissa

19 December 2002 Round 15	JS Kabylie	2–0	ASO Chlef	Tizi Ouzou
	Mounir Dob 31'; Fodhil Dob 90+2'	Report		Stadium: Stade du 1er Novembre 1954; Referee: Mahfoud Sebbagh

10 January 2003 Round 16	JS Kabylie	2–1	WA Tlemcen	Tizi Ouzou
	Belkaïd 83'; Ghazi 90'	Report	Hachemi 28'	Stadium: Stade du 1er Novembre 1954; Referee: Said Hirèche

16 January 2003 Round 17	USM Annaba	0–0	JS Kabylie	Annaba
		Report		Stadium: Stade 19 Mai 1956; Referee: Touati Djaballah

20 January 2003 Round 18	JS Kabylie	2–1	MO Constantine	Tizi Ouzou
	Ghazi 22'; Saïb 81'		Kherkhache 18'	Stadium: Stade du 1er Novembre 1954; Referee: Houari Belkacem

30 January 2003 Round 19	ASM Oran	1–1	JS Kabylie	Oran
	Balegh 90+3'	Report	Belkaïd 32'	Stadium: Stade Habib Bouakeul; Referee: Mohamed Amine Benaissa

4 February 2003 Round 20	JS Kabylie	1–1	NA Hussein Dey	Tizi Ouzou
	Belkaïd 90+3'		Moussouni 53'	Stadium: Stade du 1er Novembre 1954; Referee: Djamel Haimoudi

6 February 2003 Round 21	ES Sétif	1–1	JS Kabylie	Sétif
	Achacha 21'	Report	Amaouche 52'	Stadium: Stade Mohamed Guessab; Referee: Mohamed Benouza

17 February 2003 Round 22	JS Kabylie	4–0	USM Blida	Tizi Ouzou
	Ghazi 10', 33', 73'; Maghraoui 85'			Stadium: Stade du 1er Novembre 1954

24 February 2003 Round 23	JSM Béjaïa	1–2	JS Kabylie	Béjaïa
	Djilani 84'		Belkaïd 19'; Ghazi 26'	Stadium: Stade de l'Unité Maghrébine; Referee: Touati Djaballah

6 March 2003 Round 24	JS Kabylie	0–1	CR Belouizdad	Tizi Ouzou
		Report	Boudjakdji 79'	Stadium: Stade du 1er Novembre 1954; Referee: Chawki Mouellef

20 March 2003 Round 25	JS Kabylie	1–1	CA Bordj Bou Arreridj	Tizi Ouzou
	Maghraoui 89'	Report	Khesrani 65'	Stadium: Stade du 1er Novembre 1954; Referee: Mohamed Ould Abdellah

3 April 2003 Round 26	USM Alger	1–0	JS Kabylie	Bologhine
	Ammour 45'; Meftah (yellow card) 14'	Report	Zafour (yellow card) 26'; Bendahmane (yellow card) 52'	Stadium: Omar Hamadi Stadium; Referee: Mohamed Benouza

10 April 2003 Round 27	JS Kabylie	2–1	RC Kouba	Tizi Ouzou
	Berguiga 25'; Larbi 85'		Bouguèche 12'	Stadium: Stade du 1er Novembre 1954; Referee: Samir Boubakour

5 May 2003 Round 28	MC Oran	0–1	JS Kabylie	Oran
			Saïb 76'	Stadium: Stade Ahmed Zabana; Referee: Mohamed Amine Benaissa

8 May 2003 Round 29	JS Kabylie	2–0	CA Batna	Tizi Ouzou
	Berguiga 33'; Saïb 61'	Report		Stadium: Stade du 1er Novembre 1954; Referee: Salah Benamar

12 May 2003 Round 30	ASO Chlef	0–0	JS Kabylie	Chlef
				Stadium: Stade Mohamed Boumezrag; Referee: Farouk Ouchène

== Algerian Cup ==
2 March 2003 Round of 64	Paradou AC	1–2	JS Kabylie	Khemis El-Khechna
	Athmani 1'		Larbi 8'; Medjoudj 24'
Note: Lineup for JS Kabylie - .

13 March 2003 Round of 32	ES Guelma	0–3	JS Kabylie	Sétif
		Report	Ghazi 13'; Saïb 63'; Fodhil Dob 83'	Stadium: Stade Mohamed Guessab; Referee: Firradi, Halitim, Cheéri
Note: Lineup for JS Kabylie - Bougherara, Raho, Djouder, Drioueche (Maghraoui, 89’), Zafour, Boubrit (Dilmi, 57’), Mounir Dob, Doudène, Ghazi (Fodhil Dob, 57’), Saïb, Berguiga.

24 March 2003 Round of 16	JS Kabylie	2–0	ES Béchar	Sétif
	Mounir Dob 35'; Daham 74'	Report		Stadium: Stade 8 Mai 1945; Referee: Djerboua, Chaoui, Halitim
Note: Lineup for JS Kabylie - Boughrara, Raho (Meftah 89’), Boubrit (Daham 70’), Driouèche, Zafour, Bendahmane, Dob (Dimi 64’), Doudène, Maghraoui, Saïb, Medjoudj.

17 April 2003 Quarter-finals	CR Belouizdad	2–1	JS Kabylie	Rouïba
	Arafat Mezouar 10'; Talis 65'	Report	Berguiga 37'	Stadium: Stade Mabrouki Salem; Referee: Mohamed Benouza
Note: Lineup for JS Kabylie - Gaouaoui, Raho, Boubrit (Meftah, 46’), Bendahmane, Zafour, Belkaïd, Berguiga, Doudène (Daham, 75’), Ghazi, Saïb, Medjoudj (Larbi, 73’).

== 2002 CAF Cup ==
=== Quarter-finals ===
30 October 2002 First leg	JS Kabylie (Algeria)	2–1	(Mali) Djoliba AC	Algiers
	Maghraoui 34'; Fodhil Dob 84'	Report	Diallo Lassana 77'	Stadium: Stade 5 Juillet 1962
Note: Lineup for JS Kabylie - Gaouaoui - Raho, Benhamlat, Meftah, Zafour, Belkaïd, Meghraoui, Boubrit (Bendahmane, 77’), Doudène, Amaouche Y., (Dob Mounir, 80’), Berguiga, (Dob Fodhil ,61’).

15 September 2002 Second leg	Djoliba AC (Mali)	0–0 (1–2 agg.)	(Algeria) JS Kabylie	Bamako
18:00		Report		Stadium: Stade du 26 Mars
Note: Lineup for JS Kabylie - Gaouaoui, Raho, Benhamlat, Zafour, Meftah, Doudène, Belkaïd, Bendahmane (Boubrit, 70'), Meghraoui (Hamlaoui, 81'), Amaouche (Fodhil Dob, 90+2'), Mounir Dob.

=== Semi-finals ===
4 October 2002 First leg	Al-Masry (Egypt)	1–0	(Algeria) JS Kabylie	Port Said
	Ibrahim El-Masry 89'	Report		Stadium: Port Said Stadium; Referee: Larjoun, Fenen, Djedyoui (Morocco)
Note: Lineup for JS Kabylie - Gaouaoui, Rahou, Benhamlat, Zafour, Driouèche, Hamlaoui, Meftah (Y. Amaouche, 60'), Boubrit, Maghraoui, M. Dob (Berguiga, 85'), F. Dob.

18 October 2002 Second leg	JS Kabylie (Algeria)	2–0 (2–1 agg.)	(Egypt) Al-Masry	Algiers
	Bendahmane 17'; Belkaïd 89' (pen.)	Report		Stadium: Stade 5 Juillet 1962; Referee: Mancerio Pearti (Cape Verde)
Note: Lineup for JS Kabylie - Gaouaoui, Raho (Boubrit, 90'), Benhamlat, Drioueche, Zafour, Belkaïd, Amaouche (Fodhil Dob, 68'), Berguiga, Bendahmane, Maghraoui, Mounir Dob.

=== Final ===
8 November 2002 First leg	JS Kabylie (Algeria)	4–0	(Cameroon) Tonnerre Yaoundé	Algiers
21:30	Amaouche 2'; Berguiga 45', 85'; Drioueche 61'			Stadium: Stade 5 Juillet 1962; Referee: Coffi Codjia (Benin)
Note: Lineup for JS Kabylie - Gaouaoui, Raho, Drioueche, Zafour, Djouder, Mounir Dob (Meghraoui, 76'), Bendahmane, Belkaïd, Boubrit (Dilmi, 26'), Amaouche (Fodhil Dob, 89'), Berguiga.

24 November 2002 Second leg	Tonnerre Yaoundé (Cameroon)	1–0 (1–4 agg.)	(Algeria) JS Kabylie	Yaoundé
15:30	Eyoum 11'	Report		Stadium: Stade Ahmadou Ahidjo; Referee: Hichem Guirat (Tunisia)
Note: Lineup for JS Kabylie - Gaouaoui, Raho (Boubrit, 58'), Drioueche, Zafour, Djouder, Mounir Dob, Bendahmane, Belkaïd, Fodhil Dob (Hammoudi, 78'), Amaouche, Berguiga.

== 2003 CAF Cup ==
=== Second round ===
17 May 2003 First leg	SONACOS (Senegal)	1–1	(Algeria) JS Kabylie
	Zafour 76' (o.g.)	Report	Berguiga 17'
Note: Lineup for JS Kabylie - .

30 May 2003 Second leg	JS Kabylie (Algeria)	0–0 (1–1 agg.)	(Senegal) SONACOS	Tizi Ouzou
				Stadium: Stade du 1er Novembre 1954
Note: Lineup for JS Kabylie - .

== Squad information ==
=== Playing statistics ===
No.	Pos	Nat	Player	Total		National 1		Algerian Cup		CAF Cup	
No.	Pos	Nat	Player	Apps	Goals	Apps	Goals	Apps	Goals	Apps	Goals
1	GK	(Algeria) ALG	Lounès Gaouaoui	37	0	30	0	1	0	6	0
	GK	(Algeria) ALG	Liamine Bougherara	2	0	0	0	2	0	0	0
5	DF	(Algeria) ALG	Brahim Zafour	35	0	26	0	3	0	6	0
	DF	(Algeria) ALG	Abdelaziz Benhamlat	13	0	9	0	0	0	4	0
22	DF	(Algeria) ALG	Noureddine Drioueche	32	1	26	0	2	0	4	1
2	DF	(Algeria) ALG	Slimane Raho	29	1	20	1	3	0	6	0
15	DF	(Algeria) ALG	Said Besseghir	8	0	8	0	0	0	0	0
19	DF	(Algeria) ALG	Samir Djouder	18	0	15	0	1	0	2	0
20	DF	(Algeria) ALG	Rahim Meftah	7	0	2	0	2	0	3	0
6	MF	(Algeria) ALG	Farouk Belkaïd	33	9	27	8	1	0	5	1
13	MF	(Algeria) ALG	Lounés Bendahmane	33	4	26	3	2	0	5	1
7	MF	(Algeria) ALG	Nassim Hamlaoui	6	0	4	0	0	0	2	0
17	MF	(Algeria) ALG	Abdelkrim Doudène	22	0	17	0	3	0	2	0
	MF	(Algeria) ALG	Yacine Amaouche	27	6	21	5	0	0	6	1
8	MF	(Algeria) ALG	Moussa Saïb	17	4	14	3	3	1	0	0
21	MF	(Algeria) ALG	Hakim Boubrit	35	0	26	0	3	0	6	0
	MF	(Algeria) ALG	Nacer Mohamed Medjoudj	11	0	9	0	2	0	0	0
	MF	(Algeria) ALG	Mohamed Maghraoui	30	4	23	3	2	0	5	1
	MF	(Algeria) ALG	Rabie Dilmi	13	0	10	0	2	0	1	0
	FW	(Algeria) ALG	Mounir Dob	31	5	23	4	2	1	6	0
16	FW	(Algeria) ALG	Hamid Berguiga	28	5	21	2	2	1	5	2
	FW	(Algeria) ALG	Farid Ghazi	15	7	13	6	2	1	0	0
	FW	(Algeria) ALG	Noureddine Daham	4	1	2	0	2	1	0	0
	FW	(Algeria) ALG	Fodhil Dob	18	4	11	2	1	1	6	1
	FW	(Algeria) ALG	Hocine Hammoudi	5	0	4	0	0	0	1	0
14	FW	(Algeria) ALG	Mohand Larbi	7	1	6	1	1	0	0	0
24	FW	(Algeria) ALG	Takfarinas Douicher	8	0	8	0	0	0	0	0
Players transferred out during the season

Source: Competitions

=== Goalscorers ===
Includes all competitive matches. The list is sorted alphabetically by surname when total goals are equal.

No.	Nat.	Player	Pos.	N 1	AC	CC 2	TOTAL
6	(Algeria)	Farouk Belkaïd	MF	8	0	1	9
	(Algeria)	Hocine Gasmi	FW	6	0	1	7
	(Algeria)	Farid Ghazi	FW	6	1	0	7
	(Algeria)	Yacine Amaouche	MF	5	0	1	6
16	(Algeria)	Hamid Berguiga	FW	2	1	3	6
	(Algeria)	Mounir Dob	FW	4	1	0	5
8	(Algeria)	Moussa Saïb	MF	3	1	0	4
13	(Algeria)	Lounés Bendahmane	MF	3	0	1	4
	(Algeria)	Mohamed Maghraoui	MF	3	0	1	4
	(Algeria)	Fodhil Dob	FW	2	1	1	4
14	(Algeria)	Mohand Larbi	FW	1	1	0	2
2	(Algeria)	Slimane Raho	DF	1	0	0	1
	(Algeria)	Noureddine Daham	FW	0	1	0	1
	(Algeria)	Nacer Mohamed Medjoudj	MF	0	1	0	1
22	(Algeria)	Noureddine Drioueche	DF	0	0	1	1
Own Goals				0	0	0	0
Totals				44	8	10	62

=== Clean sheets ===
Includes all competitive matches.

No.	Nat	Name	N 1	AC	CC	Total
1	(Algeria)	Lounès Gaouaoui	9	0	2	11
	(Algeria)	Liamine Bougherara	0	2	0	2
		TOTALS	9	2	4	15

== Transfers ==
=== In ===
Date	Pos	Player	From club	Transfer fee	Source
1 July 2002	MF	(Algeria) Yacine Amaouche	JSM Béjaïa	Undisclosed	
1 July 2002	FW	(Algeria) Noureddine Daham	ASM Oran	Undisclosed	
1 July 2002	FW	(Algeria) Fodhil Dob	MC Alger	Undisclosed	
1 January 2003	MF	(Algeria) Moussa Saïb	(United Arab Emirates) Dubai CSC	Undisclosed	
1 January 2003	FW	(Algeria) Farid Ghazi	(France) Troyes AC	Undisclosed	

=== Out ===
Date	Pos	Player	To club	Transfer fee	Source
1 July 2002	MF	(Algeria) Yacine Bezzaz	(France) AC Ajaccio	Undisclosed	
