= 2001–02 JS Kabylie season =

JS Kabylie
2001–02 season
- President: Mohand Chérif Hannachi
- Head Coach: Kamel Mouassa
- Stadium: Stade du 1^{er} Novembre 1954; Stade Djillali Bounâama; Stade du 5 Juillet
- National 1: Runners-up
- Algerian Cup: Semi-finals
- CAF Cup: 2001: Winners; 2002: Second round
- Top goalscorer: League: Mounir Dob (12); All: Mounir Dob (14)
Home colours	Away colours

The 2001–02 season is JS Kabylie's 37th season in the Algerian top flight, They will be competing in National 1, the Algerian Cup and the CAF Cup.

== Squad list ==
Players and squad numbers last updated on 1 September 2001.
Note: Flags indicate national team as has been defined under FIFA eligibility rules. Players may hold more than one non-FIFA nationality.

No.	Nat.	Position	Name	Date of Birth (Age)	Signed from
Goalkeepers
	(Algeria)	GK	Lounès Gaouaoui	28 September 1977 (aged 24)	(Algeria) USM Drâa Ben Khedda
	(Algeria)	GK	Liamine Bougherara	1 December 1971 (aged 30)	(Algeria)
Defenders
	(Algeria)	CB	Brahim Zafour	30 November 1977 (aged 24)	(Algeria) Youth system
	(Algeria)	LB	Abdelaziz Benhamlat	22 March 1974 (aged 27)	(Algeria) RC Kouba
	(Algeria)		Hakim Boubrit	9 August 1975 (aged 26)	(Algeria)
	(Algeria)	CB	Rahim Meftah	15 August 1980 (aged 21)	(Algeria) Youth system
	(Algeria)	CB	Noureddine Drioueche	27 October 1973 (aged 28)	(Algeria) JS Bordj Ménaïel
	(Algeria)	RB	Slimane Raho	20 October 1975 (aged 26)	(Algeria) MC Oran
	(Algeria)		Lahcène Nazef	2 September 1974 (aged 27)	(Algeria) MC Alger
Midfielders
	(Algeria)	DM	Farouk Belkaïd	14 November 1977 (aged 24)	(Algeria) JS Bordj Ménaïel
	(Algeria)	DM	Lounés Bendahmane	3 April 1977 (aged 24)	(Algeria) JS Bordj Ménaïel
	(Algeria)		Mohamed Reda Abaci	8 August 1975 (aged 26)	(Algeria) USM Annaba
	(Algeria)		Nassim Hamlaoui	25 February 1981 (aged 20)	(Algeria) Youth system
	(Algeria)		Abdelkrim Doudène	25 October 1972 (aged 29)	(Algeria) JS Bordj Ménaïel
	(Algeria)		Mohamed Medjoudj	8 July 1977 (aged 24)	(Algeria) CS Constantine
	(Algeria)		Yacine Bezzaz	10 July 1981 (aged 20)	(Algeria) CS Constantine
Forwards
	(Algeria)		Mounir Dob	1 February 1974 (aged 27)	(Algeria) CA Batna
	(Algeria)		Mohamed Meghraoui	30 October 1976 (aged 25)	(Algeria)
	(Algeria)		Samir Djouder	28 March 1981 (aged 20)	(Algeria) Youth system
	(Algeria)		Hamid Berguiga	25 April 1974 (aged 27)	(Algeria) USM El Harrach
	(Algeria)		Belkacem Khadir	14 June 1981 (aged 20)	(Algeria) Youth system

== Competitions ==
=== Overview ===
Competition	Record								Started round	Final position / round	First match	Last match
Competition	G	W	D	L	GF	GA	GD	Win %	Started round	Final position / round	First match	Last match
National	30	15	7	8	47	24	+23	50.00	—N/a	Runners-up	30 August 2001	1 July 2002
Algerian Cup	4	3	0	1	8	3	+5	75.00	Round of 64	Semi-finals	14 March 2002	10 June 2002
2001 CAF Cup	6	4	0	2	8	5	+3	66.67	Quarter-finals	Finals	8 September 2001	23 November 2001
2002 CAF Cup	2	1	1	0	6	3	+3	50.00	Second round		13 April 2002	28 April 2002
Total	42	23	8	11	69	35	+34	54.76				

Updated to match played 3 June 2019
Source: Competitions

=== National ===
==== League table ====
Pos	Team	Pld	W	D	L	GF	GA	GD	Pts	Qualification or relegation
1	USM Alger (C)	30	17	6	7	37	24	+13	57	2003 CAF Champions League
2	JS Kabylie	30	15	7	8	47	24	+23	52	2003 CAF Cup
3	WA Tlemcen	30	14	9	7	39	24	+15	51	2003 African Cup Winners' Cup
4	CR Belouizdad	30	16	4	10	45	31	+14	52	
5	MC Oran	30	13	6	11	31	28	+3	45	

Source: rsssf
Rules for classification: 1) points; 2) goal difference; 3) number of goals scored.
(C) Champions

==== Results summary ====
Overall								Home						Away					
Pld	W	D	L	GF	GA	GD	Pts	W	D	L	GF	GA	GD	W	D	L	GF	GA	GD
30	15	7	8	47	24	+23	52	14	1	0	40	9	+31	1	6	8	7	15	−8

Last updated: 22 April 2018.
Source: Competitive matches

==== Results by round ====
Round	1	2	3	4	5	6	7	8	9	10	11	12	13	14	15	16	17	18	19	20	21	22	23	24	25	26	27	28	29	30
Ground	H	A	H	A	H	A	A	H	A	H	A	H	A	H	A	A	H	A	H	A	H	H	A	H	A	H	A	H	A	H
Result	W	L	W	D	W	L	D	W	L	D	L	W	D	W	D	W	W	L	W	D	W	W	D	W	L	W	L	W	L	W
Position	2	7	3	4	2	4	6	3	3	3	5	3	3	3	3	3	3	3	3	3	3	2	2	2	2	2	2	2	2	2

Source: Competitive matches
A = Away; H = Home; W = Win; D = Draw; L = Loss

==== Matches ====
Win Draw Loss

30 August 2001 Round 1	JS Kabylie	3–1	ASM Oran	Tizi Ouzou
	Boubrit 10'; Berguiga 14', 45'	Report	Ammour 79' (pen.)	Stadium: Stade 1er Novembre 1954; Referee: Moualef, Medjoudj, Sedrati
Note: Lineup for JS Kabylie - Bougherara - Raho, Benhamlat, Driouèche, Zafour - Belkaïd, Bendahmane (Nazef 73’), Boubrit, Abaci (Meghraoui 73’) - Berguigua (Kherroubi, 69’), Bezzaz.

8 September 2001 Round 2	USM Alger	2–1	JS Kabylie	Bologhine
15:00	Ghazi (yellow card) 27'; Meftah 54'; Benchergui 66'; Djahnine (yellow card) 67'	Report	Benhamlat (yellow card) 10'; Drioueche (yellow card) 21'; Bezzaz 46' (yellow card) 49'	Stadium: Omar Hamadi Stadium; Referee: Berber, Djezzar, Achrouf
Note: Lineup for JS Kabylie - Gaouaoui - Raho, Benhamlat, Driouèche, Zafour - Belkaïd, Boubrit, Bendahmane (Boudjelid, 89'), Abaci (Nazef, 50') - Bezaz, Berguigua (Dob, 50').

13 September 2001 Round 3	JS Kabylie	(w/o)	CR Belouizdad	Tizi Ouzou
				Stadium: Stade 1er Novembre 1954

30 October 2001 Round 4	JSM Bejaia	1–1	JS Kabylie	El Eulma
	Amaouche S. 82'	Report	Bendahmane 88' (pen.)	Stadium: Stade Messaoud Zougar; Referee: Haïmoudi, Dani, Sedrati
Note: Lineup for JS Kabylie - Gaouaoui, Raho, Drioueche, Meftah, Zafour (Hamlaoui, 65’), Belkaïd (Khatir, 86’), Nazef, Bendahmane, Maghraoui, Berguigua, Dob (Boudjelid, 90’).

28 September 2001 Round 5	JS Kabylie	1–0	USM Blida	Tizi Ouzou
15:00	Boubrit 42'	Report		Stadium: Stade 1er Novembre 1954; Referee: Seghir, Belfekroun, Ghenam.
Note: Lineup for JS Kabylie - Bougherara - Raho, Benhamlat, Driouèche, Zafour - Belkaïd, Boubrit (Nazef, 46’), Bendehmane (Meghraoui, 46’), Abaci (Dob, 30') - Berguigua, Bezzaz.

24 December 2001 Round 6	CA Batna	1–0	JS Kabylie	Batna
	Aribi 65'	Report		Stadium: Mustapha Seffouhi Stadium; Referee: Moualef, Dari, Chedli
Note: Lineup for JS Kabylie - Gaouaoui - Raho (Doudène, 83’), Benhamlat (cap), Driouèche, Zafour - Belkaïd, Nazef, Bendahmane, Abaci (Kherroubi, 73’) - Dob M., Berguiga.

18 October 2001 Round 7	AS Ain M'lila	1–1	JS Kabylie	Aïn M'lila
	Izzaoui R. 52' (pen.)	Report	Mounir Dob 16'	Stadium: Stade des Frères Demane-Debbih; Referee: Belkacem, Gaïd, Oukil
Note: Lineup for JS Kabylie - Gaouaoui, Rahou, Hamlaoui, Drioueche, Zafour - Belkaïd, Boubrit, Nazef - Dob M., Maghraoui (Berguiga, 63'), Bezzaz.

7 January 2002 Round 8	JS Kabylie	2–0	MC Oran	Tizi Ouzou
	Mounir Dob 45', 61'	Report		Stadium: Stade 1er Novembre 1954; Referee: Abdi, Akrour, Seghir
Note: Lineup for JS Kabylie - Gaouaoui - Raho, Benhamlat, Driouche, Zafour - Belkaïd, Bendahmane (Nazef, 70’), Meghraoui - Berguigua (Kheroubi, 85’), Bezzaz, Dob.

2 November 2001 Round 9	WA Tlemcen	1–0	JS Kabylie	Tlemcen
	Meziani ?'	Report		Stadium: Stade Akid Lotfi; Referee: Lahmar, Sedrati, Khelifatni
Note: Lineup for JS Kabylie - Gaouaoui, Meftah, Benhamlat, Driouèche, Zaffour, Belkaïd, Dob, Nazef puis Benkaci (80’), Bendahmène, Meghraoui puis Bezzaz (66’), Berguigua.

10 January 2002 Round 10	JS Kabylie	0–0	MC Alger	Tizi Ouzou
		Report		Stadium: Stade 1er Novembre 1954; Referee: Djaballah, Djezzar, Benkhaled
Note: Lineup for JS Kabylie - Gaouaoui - Raho, Benhamlat F. (Hamlaoui, 60’), Driouèche, Zafour - Belkaïd, Bendahmane, Doudène - Kherroubi, Berguigua (Meftah, 83’), Bezzaz.

29 November 2001 Round 11	RC Kouba	2–0	JS Kabylie	Kouba
	Bouferma 1', 31'	Report		Stadium: Stade Omar Benhaddad; Referee: Youbi, Mezouari, Akrour
Note: Lineup for JS Kabylie - Boughrara - Raho, Nazef, Meftah R., Zafour - Belkaïd, Boubrit (Maghraoui, 16’), Bendahmane, Abaci (Berguiga, 46’) - Bezzaz, Dob.

13 December 2001 Round 12	JS Kabylie	3–1	CA Bordj Bou Arreridj	Tizi Ouzou
	Mounir Dob 48'; Zafour 73'; Bendahmane 87'	Report	Igranaïssi 49'	Stadium: Stade 1er Novembre 1954; Referee: Haïmoudi, Kerraï, Chetouane
Note: Lineup for JS Kabylie - Bougherara - Nazef, Benhamlat, Raho, Zafour - Belkaïd, Bendahmane, Abaci (Maghraoui, 46') - Berguiga (Doudène, 81’), Bezzaz (Boudjellid, 90’), Dob F.

20 December 2001 Round 13	MO Constantine	0–0	JS Kabylie	Constantine
		Report		Stadium: Stade Mohamed Hamlaoui; Referee: Hirrèche, Nakouri, Zaïd
Note: Lineup for JS Kabylie - Gaouaoui - Raho, Benhmalat (cap), Zafour, Drioueche - Belkaïd, Nazef, Bendahmane (Medjoudj), Abaci - Bezzaz (Berguigua), Dob.

4 February 2002 Round 14	JS Kabylie	3–2	ES Sétif	Boumerdès
	Bezzaz 20'; Belkaïd 56'; Mounir Dob 81'	Report	Laâmeche 11'; Fellahi 40'	Stadium: Stade Djillali Bounâama; Referee: Berber, Achrouf, Seghir
Note: Lineup for JS Kabylie - Gaouaoui, Raho, Benhamlat, Medjoudj, Zafour, Belkaïd, Meghraoui (Bendahmane, 66'), Boubrit (Meftah, 46'), Berguiga, Bezzaz, Dob M.

3 January 2002 Round 15	USM Annaba	1–1	JS Kabylie	Annaba
	Boudar 86'	Report	Berguiga 90+2'	Stadium: Stade 19 Mai 1956; Referee: Hirèche, Saker, Khalous
Note: Lineup for JS Kabylie - Gaouaoui, Raho, Doudène, Driouèche, Zafour, Bendahmane, Dob (Kheroubi), Nazef, Medjouj, Maghraoui (Berguiga), Bezaz.

8 February 2002 Round 16	ASM Oran	1–2	JS Kabylie	Oran
	Bendida 47'	Report	Bahloul 45', 58'	Stadium: Stade Habib Bouakeul; Referee: Ouchène, Debbouche, Tires
Note: Lineup for JS Kabylie - Gaouaoui, Raho, Doudène, Driouèche, Zafour, Belkaïd, Dob (Berguiga 85’), Medjoudj, Bahloul, Bendahmane, Bezzaz (Boubrit 90’).

14 February 2002 Round 17	JS Kabylie	2–1	USM Alger	Boumerdès
15:00	Bendehmane 27' (pen.); Bezzaz 71'	Report	Benchergui 66'	Stadium: Stade Djillali Bounâama; Referee: Benouza, Oukil, Kaïd
Note: Lineup for JS Kabylie - Gaouaoui - Raho, Doudène, Driouèche, Zafour (Cap.) - Belkaïd, Medjoudj, Bendahmane - Bahloul (Meghraoui, 88’), Bezzaz (Boubrit, 83’), Dob.

18 February 2002 Round 18	CR Belouizdad	2–1	JS Kabylie	Algiers
	Boudjakdji 35'; Badji 47'	Report	Bahloul 85'	Stadium: Stade du 20 Août 1955; Referee: Haïmoudi, Kerraz, Chetouane
Note: Lineup for JS Kabylie - Gaouaoui - Raho, Benhamlat, Driouèche, Zafour (Meftah, 48’), Belkaïd, Medjoudj, Boubrit (Berguiga, 66’), Bendahmane, Dob (Kharoubi, 87’), Bahloul.

25 February 2002 Round 19	JS Kabylie	3–0	JSM Bejaia	Boumerdès
	Raho 26'; Medjoudj 32'; Bendahmane 81'	Report		Stadium: Stade Djillali Bounâama; Referee: Mouellef, Sedrati, Chedly
Note: Lineup for JS Kabylie - Gaouaoui - Raho, Benhamlat (Cap), Driouèche, Zafour - Belkaïd, Medjoudj, Bendahmane - Behloul (Berguigua, 85’), Dob (Doudène, 83’), Bezzaz (Meghraoui, 75’).

7 March 2002 Round 20	USM Blida	0–0	JS Kabylie	Blida
15:00	Belouahem (yellow card) 12'	Report	Bendahmane (yellow card) 52'; Maghraoui (yellow card) 60'; Bezzaz (yellow card) 64'	Stadium: Mustapha Tchaker Stadium; Referee: Belkacem, Daouadji, Ouafed
Note: Lineup for JS Kabylie - Gaouaoui - Raho, Doudène, Meftah (cap.), Zafour - Nazef, Boubrit, Meghraoui (Hamlaoui, 86'), Bendahmane - Bahloul (Berguigua, 89'), Bezzaz (Dob M., 66').

22 March 2002 Round 21	JS Kabylie	3–0	CA Batna	Boumerdès
	Bahloul 20'; Drioueche 70'; Berguiga 75'	Report		Stadium: Stade Djillali Bounâama; Referee: Zekrini, Seghir, Zinet
Note: Lineup for JS Kabylie - Gaouaoui - Rahou, Benhamlat, Driouèche, Zafour - Belkaïd, Medjoudj, Bendahmane - Bahloul (Berguiga, 72’), Bezzaz (Boubrit, 83’), Dob (Nazef, 72’).

8 April 2002 Round 22	JS Kabylie	3–1	AS Ain M'lila	Boumerdès
	Bezzaz 1'; Belkaïd 43'; Berguiga 50'	Report	Zafour 10' (o.g.)	Stadium: Stade Djillali Bounâama; Referee: Belkacem, Dheffar, Ouaddah
Note: Lineup for JS Kabylie - Gaouaoui - Rahou, Benhamlat, Driouèche, Zaffour - Belkaïd, Medjoudj (Kherroubi, 84’), Bendahmane - Berguiga (Nazef, 75’), Bahloul (Boubrit, 65’), Bezzaz.

6 May 2002 Round 23	MC Oran	0–0	JS Kabylie	Oran
		Report		Stadium: Stade Habib Bouakeul
Note: Lineup for JS Kabylie - .

2 May 2002 Round 24	JS Kabylie	2–0	WA Tlemcen	Boumerdès
	Mounir Dob 22'; Belkaïd 48'	Report		Stadium: Stade Djillali Bounâama; Referee: Benaïssa, Belebsir, Lakhnech
Note: Lineup for JS Kabylie - Gaouaoui - Raho, Benhamlat, Driouèche, Zafour (Meftah, 87’) - Belkaïd, Medjoudj, Bendehmane - Dob M., Berguiga (Maghraoui, 88’), Bahloul (Boubrit, 85’).

20 May 2002 Round 25	MC Alger	1–0	JS Kabylie	Rouïba
	Faïsca 42'	Report		Stadium: Stade Mabrouki Salem; Referee: Zekrini, Djezzar, Berrahmoune
Note: Lineup for JS Kabylie - Gaouaoui - Doudène, Benhamlat, Driouèche, Zaffour - Belkaïd, Boubrit (Meghraoui, 57’), Bendahmane - Dob M. (Bahloul, 65’), Berguigua, Bezzaz.

3 June 2002 Round 26	JS Kabylie	2–1	RC Kouba	Boumerdès
	Mounir Dob 32'; Berguiga 81'	Report	Bouferma 88' (pen.)	Stadium: Stade Djillali Bounâama; Referee: Mouallef, Belebsir, Sedrati
Note: Lineup for JS Kabylie - Gaouaoui - Raho, Benhamlat A., Driouèche, Zaffour - Belkaïd, Medjoudj, Doudène, Boubrit (Bezaz, 75’) - Bahloul (Berguigua, 55'), Dob M.

13 June 2002 Round 27	CA Bordj Bou Arreridj	1–0	JS Kabylie	Bordj Bou Arreridj
	Haddad 1'	Report		Stadium: Stade 20 Août 1955; Attendance: 0 (close doors); Referee: Belkacem, Kerraï, Deffar
Note: Lineup for JS Kabylie - Gaouaoui, Raho, Benhamlat, Driouèche, Zafour, Belkaïd, Dob (Bahloul), Medjoudj (Boubrit) Berguiga, Bendahmane, Bezzaz (Maghraoui).

17 June 2002 Round 28	JS Kabylie	5–1	MO Constantine	Boumerdès
	Bahloul 24'; Mounir Dob 38'; Gaouaoui 65' (pen.); Rahim Meftah 79'; Berguiga 89'	Report	Bourahli 70'	Stadium: Stade Djillali Bounâama; Referee: Bechari, Akrour, Haddad
Note: Lineup for JS Kabylie - Gaouaoui, Raho, Benhamlet, Meftah (Hamlaoui), Zafour, Belkaïd, Dob, Doudène, Bahloul (Berguiga), Bendahmane (Maghraoui), Bezzaz.

24 June 2002 Round 29	ES Sétif	1–0	JS Kabylie	Sétif
	Zorgan 87'	Report		Stadium: Stade 8 Mai 1945; Referee: Mehidi, Naceri, Bechirat
Note: Lineup for JS Kabylie - Gaouaoui - Rahou, Doudène, Driouèche, Zafour, Hamlaoui - Boubrit, Meghraoui (Kheroubi, 89'), Bendahmane (Meftah R., 75') - Dob M., Bezzaz (Bahloul, 58').

1 July 2002 Round 30	JS Kabylie	5–1	USM Annaba	Boumerdès
	Mounir Dob 3', 33', 35', 87'; Rahim Meftah 52'	Report	Ouichaoui 55'	Stadium: Stade Djillali Bounâama; Referee: Hddada, Laouchi, Srer
Note: Lineup for JS Kabylie - Gaouaoui, Raho, Hamlaoui, Drioueche, Zafour (Meftah, 46'), Mounir Dob, Medjoudj, Berguiga (Belkaïd, 58'), Boubrit, Bezzaz (Douicher, 70').

== Algerian Cup ==
14 March 2002 Round of 64	JS Kabylie	4–0	MB Hassi Messaoud	Boumerdès
	Zafour 30'; Drioueche 60'; Meghraoui 74'; Berguiga 83'	Report		Stadium: Stade Djillali Bounâama; Referee: Beghara, Abbés, Amalou
Note: Lineup for JS Kabylie - Bougherara, Doudene (Nazef, 46'), Benhamlat, Driouèche, Zafour, Belkaïd, Dob (Berguigua, 45'), Medjoudj, Bahloul (Hamlaoui, 78'), Meghraoui, Boubrit.

28 March 2002 Round of 32	JSM Bejaia	(w/o)	JS Kabylie	Bejaïa
				Stadium: Stade de l'Unité Maghrébine

10 May 2002 Round of 16	CR Belouizdad	2–3	JS Kabylie	Belouizdad
	Mezouar 18'; Settara 52'	Report	Bendahmane 2'; Belkaïd 14'; Berguiga 85'	Stadium: Stade 20 Août 1955; Referee: Djaballah, Djezar, Dani
Note: Lineup for JS Kabylie - Gaouaoui, Raho, Benhamlat, Driouèche, Zaffour, Belkaïd, Bendahmane, Boubrit (Nazef, 35’, Dob M., 63'), Doudène, Bahloul (Berguiga, 55’), Bezzaz.

24 May 2002 Quarter-finals	JS Kabylie	1–0	CB Mila	Boumerdès
	Drioueche 85'	Report		Stadium: Stade Djillali Bounâama; Referee: Seghir, Kourd Bakir, Haïmoudi
Note: Lineup for JS Kabylie - Gaouaoui, Rahou, Doudène, Driouache, Zaffour, Belkaïd, Bendahmane, Hamlaoui (Maghraoui, 58’), Bahloul (Berguiga, 46’), Bezzaz, Dob M.

10 June 2002 Semi-finals	WA Tlemcen	1–0	JS Kabylie	Tlemcen
	Meziani 7'	Report		Stadium: Stade Akid Lotfi; Referee: Haïmoudi, Oulebcir, Ouadah
Note: Lineup for JS Kabylie - Gaouaoui, Rahou, Benhamlat, Deriouèche, Zafour, Belkaïd, Doudène (Dob), Bahloul (Berguiga), Boubrit (Meghraoui), Bezzaz, Medjoudj.

== 2001 CAF Cup ==
=== Quarter-finals ===
8 September 2001 First leg	Wydad Casablanca (Morocco)	0–2	(Algeria) JS Kabylie	Casablanca
		Report	Berguiga 46'; Belkaïd 61'	Stadium: Stade Mohammed V Referee: Bentadji (Egypt)
Note: Lineup for JS Kabylie - Gaouaoui - Raho, Benhamlat, Zafour, Driouèche - Belkaïd, Boubrit, Bendahmane, Abbaci - Bezzaz (Boudjelit, 86'), Berguigua (Doudène, 83').

23 September 2001 Second leg	JS Kabylie (Algeria)	1–0 (3–0 agg.)	(Morocco) Wydad Casablanca	Algiers
	Bezzaz 16'	Report		Stadium: Stade du 5 Juillet; Referee: Coulibaly, Traoré, Braman (Mali)
Note: Lineup for JS Kabylie - Bougherara, Raho, Benhamlat, Driouche, Zafour, Belkaïd, Boubrit, Bendahmane, Berguiga (Dob 63’), Abassi (Benkaci 86’), Bezzaz (Maghraoui 85’).

=== Semi-finals ===
14 October 2001 First leg	Africa Sport (Ivory Coast)	3–1	(Algeria) JS Kabylie	Abidjan
	Nkiwé 11'; Dao 21'; Kemogne 50'	Report	Bezzaz 17'	Stadium: Stade Félix Houphouët-Boigny; Referee: Hichem Guirat (Tunisia)
Note: Lineup for JS Kabylie - Bougherara - Raho, Benhamlat (c.), Drioueche, Zafour - Belkaïd, Hamlaoui (Meftah, 60'), Boubrit, Abaci - Berguigua (Dob M., 60'), Bezzaz.

27 October 2001 Second leg	JS Kabylie (Algeria)	2–0 (3–3 agg.)	(Ivory Coast) Africa Sport	Algiers
	Berguiga 60'; Mounir Dob 90+4'	Report		Stadium: Stade du 5 Juillet; Referee: Evehe, Endeng, Ndjoya (Cameroon)
Note: Lineup for JS Kabylie - Gaouaoui, Raho, Benhamlat, Driouèche, Zafour, Belkaïd, Dob, Bendahmane (Djouder 88’), Berguiga, Boubrit (Meghraoui 46’), Bezzaz.

=== Final ===
10 November 2001 First leg	Étoile du Sahel (Tunisia)	2–1	(Algeria) JS Kabylie	Sousse
	Keita 14', 74'	Report	Boubrit 42'	Stadium: Stade Olympique de Sousse; Referee: Tessema, Shaw, Gebert ()
Note: Lineup for JS Kabylie - Gaouaoui, Raho, Benhamlat, Driouche, Zafour, Meftah, Dob, Bendahmane (Abaci 83’), Belkaïd, Boubrit, Bezzaz (Berguigua 86’).

23 November 2001 Second leg	JS Kabylie (Algeria)	1–0 (2–2 agg.)	(Tunisia) Étoile du Sahel	Algiers
	Zafour 30'	Report		Stadium: Stade du 5 Juillet; Referee: Kanoute, Traoré, Diabate (Mali)
Note: Lineup for JS Kabylie - Gaouaoui, (Bougherara 70’), Raho, Benhamlat, Driouèche, Zafour, Belkaïd, Nazef, Abaci, Bendahmane, Berguigua, Dob.

== 2002 CAF Cup ==
=== Second round ===
13 April 2002 First leg	ASC Ndiambour (Senegal)	0–0	(Algeria) JS Kabylie	Dakar
		Report		Stadium: Stade Galoumdou Diob; Referee: Monterro, Fernandez, Costa (Cape Verde)
Note: Lineup for JS Kabylie - Gaouaoui, Raho, Benhamlet, Driouèche, Zafour, Belkaïd, Boubrit, Medjoudj, Behloul (Berguiga), Bendahmane, Bezzaz (Dob).

28 April 2002 Second leg	JS Kabylie (Algeria)	6–3 (6–3 agg.)	(Senegal) ASC Ndiambour	Boumerdès
	Bezzaz 15', 35', 85'; Daouda 48' (o.g.); Mounir Dob 78'; Belkaïd 90'	Report		Stadium: Stade Djillali Bounâama; Referee: Tahiri, Dahbi, Kitabali (Morocco)
Note: Lineup for JS Kabylie - Gaouaoui - Raho, Benhamlat, Driouèche, Zafour - Belkaïd, Medjoudj, Bendahmane - Bahloul (Berguiga, 51’), Bezzaz (Boubrit, 90’), Dob.

== Squad information ==
=== Playing statistics ===
No.	Pos	Nat	Player	Total		National 1		Algerian Cup		CAF Cup	
No.	Pos	Nat	Player	Apps	Goals	Apps	Goals	Apps	Goals	Apps	Goals
	GK	(Algeria) ALG	Lounès Gaouaoui	9	0	0	0	3	0	6	0
	GK	(Algeria) ALG	Liamine Bougherara	4	0	0	0	1	0	3	0
	DF	(Algeria) ALG	Brahim Zafour	12	2	0	0	4	1	8	1
	DF	(Algeria) ALG	Abdelaziz Benhamlat	11	0	0	0	3	0	8	0
	DF	(Algeria) ALG	Hakim Boubrit	10	1	0	0	3	0	7	1
	DF	(Algeria) ALG	Noureddine Drioueche	12	2	0	0	4	2	8	0
	DF	(Algeria) ALG	Slimane Raho	11	0	0	0	3	0	8	0
	DF	(Algeria) ALG	Lahcène Nazef	3	0	0	0	2	0	1	0
	DF	(Algeria) ALG	Rahim Meftah	2	0	0	0	0	0	2	0
	MF	(Algeria) ALG	Farouk Belkaïd	12	3	0	0	4	1	8	2
	MF	(Algeria) ALG	Lounés Bendahmane	9	1	0	0	2	1	7	0
	MF	(Algeria) ALG	Mohamed Reda Abaci	5	0	0	0	0	0	5	0
	MF	(Algeria) ALG	Nassim Hamlaoui	3	0	0	0	2	0	1	0
	MF	(Algeria) ALG	Yacine Bezzaz	10	5	0	0	3	0	7	5
	MF	(Algeria) ALG	Abdelkrim Doudène	5	0	0	0	4	0	1	0
	MF	(Algeria) ALG	Mohamed Medjoudj	4	0	0	0	2	0	2	0
	MF	(Algeria) ALG	Tahar Benkaci	1	0	0	0	0	0	1	0
	MF	(Algeria) ALG	Lamara Douicher	0	0	0	0	0	0	0	0
	FW	(Algeria) ALG	Mounir Dob	11	2	0	0	4	0	7	2
	FW	(Algeria) ALG	Mohamed Meghraoui	5	1	0	0	3	1	2	0
	FW	(Algeria) ALG	Samir Djouder	1	0	0	0	0	0	1	0
	FW	(Algeria) ALG	Belkacem Khadir	0	0	0	0	0	0	0	0
	FW	(Algeria) ALG	Hamid Berguiga	12	4	0	0	4	2	8	2
	FW	(Algeria) ALG	Hamid Bahloul	6	0	0	0	4	0	2	0
	FW	(Algeria) ALG	Bachir Boudjelid	1	0	0	0	0	0	1	0
Players transferred out during the season

Source: Competitions

=== Goalscorers ===
Includes all competitive matches. The list is sorted alphabetically by surname when total goals are equal.

No.	Nat.	Player	Pos.	N 1	AC	CC 2	TOTAL
	(Algeria)	Mounir Dob	FW	12	0	2	14
	(Algeria)	Hamid Berguiga	FW	7	2	2	11
	(Algeria)	Yacine Bezzaz	MF	4	0	5	9
	(Algeria)	Farouk Belkaïd	MF	3	1	3	7
	(Algeria)	Hamid Bahloul	FW	5	0	0	5
	(Algeria)	Lounés Bendahmane	MF	4	1	0	5
	(Algeria)	Hakim Boubrit	DF	2	0	1	3
	(Algeria)	Brahim Zafour	DF	1	1	1	3
	(Algeria)	Noureddine Drioueche	DF	1	2	0	3
	(Algeria)	Rahim Meftah	DF	2	0	0	2
	(Algeria)	Slimane Raho	DF	1	0	0	1
	(Algeria)	Mohamed Medjoudj	MF	1	0	0	1
	(Algeria)	Lounès Gaouaoui	GK	1	0	0	1
	(Algeria)	Mohamed Meghraoui	FW	0	1	0	1
Own Goals				0	0	1	1
Totals				44	8	14	66

== Transfers ==
=== Out ===
Date	Pos	Player	To club	Transfer fee	Source
1 July 2001	FW	(Algeria) Fawzi Moussouni	(France) US Creteil	Undisclosed	
