= 2006 Algerian Super Cup =

- Stade du 5 Juillet hosted the match
JS Kabylie	MC Alger
Ligue 1	Algerian Cup
1	2
- Date: 1 November 2006
- Venue: Stade 5 Juillet 1962, Algiers
- Attendance: 50.000

The 2006 Algerian Super Cup is the 5th edition of Algerian Super Cup, a football match contested by the winners of the Championnat National and 2005–06 Algerian Cup competitions. The match was played on 1 November 2006 at Stade 5 Juillet 1962 in Algiers. Algerian Cup winners MC Alger defeated Championnat National winners JS Kabylie with a score of 2-1.

== Match details ==
1 November 2006
16:00

JS Kabylie	1–2	MC Alger
Douicher 55'		40' Bouguèche; 75' Belkaïd

Stade 5 Juillet 1962, Algiers
Attendance: 50.000
Referee: Ahmed Awda (Egypt)

GK	26	(Algeria) Faouzi Chaouchi
DF	30	(Algeria) Mohamed Rabie Meftah	(substituted off) 54'
DF	20	(Algeria) Rahim Meftah
DF	3	(Algeria) Brahim Zafour
DF	5	(Algeria) Sofiane Harkat
MF	6	(Algeria) Nassim Hamlaoui	(substituted off) 54'
MF	8	(Algeria) Chérif Abdeslam
MF	18	(Algeria) Lamara Douicher
MF	25	(Algeria) Fahem Ouslati	(substituted off) 67'
MF	27	(Benin) Wassiou Oladipupo
FW	11	(Algeria) Nabil Hemani
Substitutes :
FW	9	(Algeria) Youcef Saïbi	(substituted on) 54'
FW	14	(Algeria) Boubeker Athmani	(substituted on) 54'
MF	23	(Algeria) Anwar Boudjakdji	(substituted on) 67'
Manager :
(Algeria) Azzedine Aït Djoudi

GK	1	(Algeria) Merouane Abdouni
DF	2	(Algeria) Larbi Hosni	(substituted off) 63'
DF	15	(Algeria) Réda Babouche
DF	12	(Mali) Moussa Coulibaly
DF	4	(Algeria) Kamel Bouacida
MF	18	(Algeria) Farouk Belkaïd
MF	8	(Algeria) Fayçal Badji (c)
MF	13	(Algeria) Lounés Bendahmane
MF	10	(Algeria) Fodil Hadjadj	(substituted off) 84'
FW	29	(Algeria) Sofiane Younès
FW	19	(Algeria) Hadj Bouguèche
Substitutes :
MF	6	(Algeria) Zoubir Zmit	(substituted on) 63'
MF	7	(Algeria) Ammar Largot	(substituted on) 84'
Manager :
(France) François Bracci
