= 2006–07 Algerian Cup =

- Stade du 5 Juillet hosted the final

Tournament details
- Country: Algeria

Final positions
- Champions: MC Alger (6th title)
- Runners-up: USM Alger

The 2006–07 Algerian Cup was the 43rd edition of the Algerian Cup. MC Alger won the Cup by defeating city rivals USM Alger 1–0 in the final with a goal from midfielder Fodil Hadjadj. It was MC Alger's sixth Algerian Cup and their second in a row.

== Round of 16 ==
Tie no	Home team	Score	Away team
1	USM Blida	1–0	JSM Béjaïa
2	CR Belouizdad	3–1	USM Dréan
3	ES Mostaganem	2–3	USM Alger
4	CS Constantine	0–1	ES Sétif
5	AS Khroub	2–4 (a.e.t.)	JS Kabylie
6	MC Oran	1–0	MC Mekhadma
7	ASO Chlef	2–1 (a.e.t.)	RC Kouba
8	MC Alger	2–0	WR Bentalha

== Quarter-finals ==
Tie no	Home team	Score	Away team
1	MC Oran	2–2 (5-6 p)	JS Kabylie
2	USM Alger	1–0	ES Sétif
3	ASO Chlef	0–1	MC Alger
4	USM Blida	2–0	CR Belouizdad

24 May 2007

MC Oran	2–2 (a.e.t.)	JS Kabylie
Seddik Berradja 28'; Moulay Haddou 62'	Report	Cheikh Oumar Dabo 33'; Chérif Abdeslam 90'
Penalties
Bouazza Feham (penalty scored); Kouider Boukessassa (penalty missed); Moulay Haddou (penalty scored); Karim Meddahi (penalty missed); Hichem Mezaïr (penalty scored); Kouider Boukessassa (penalty scored); Samir Hamidi (penalty scored); Gilles Binya (penalty missed)	5–6	(penalty missed) Cheikh Oumar Dabo; (penalty scored) Ali Bendebka; (penalty missed) Nassim Hamlaoui; (penalty scored) Chérif Abdeslam; (penalty scored) Sofiane Bengoureïne; (penalty scored) Kamel Marek; (penalty scored) Mohamed Rabie Meftah; (penalty scored) Faouzi Chaouchi

Stade Abdelkader Khellal, Aïn Defla
Referee: Khelifi

24 May 2007

USM Alger	1–0	ES Sétif
Mintou Doucoure 85'	Report

Stade 1er Novembre, Tizi Ouzou
Attendance: 8,000
Referee: Belkacem

24 May 2007

ASO Chlef	0–1	MC Alger
	Report	Hadj Bouguèche 23'

Stade Communal, Khemis Miliana
Referee: Djaballah

24 May 2007

USM Blida	2–0	CR Belouizdad
Smaïl Diss 34'; Billal Zouani 90' (pen.)	Report

Stade de l'Unité Maghrébine, Béjaïa
Referee: Mohamed Benouza

== Semi-finals ==
Tie no	Home team	Score	Away team
1	JS Kabylie	1–4	USM Alger
2	MC Alger	0–0 (7-6 p)	USM Blida

15 June 2007

JS Kabylie	1–4	USM Alger
Nabil Hemani 76'	Report	Sedonoude Abouta 18', 70'; Antar Boucherit 44' (penalty); Mintou Doucoure 81'

Stade Mustapha Tchaker, Blida
Referee: Djaballah

15 June 2007

MC Alger	0–0	USM Blida
	Report
Penalties
	7–6

Stade 1er Novembre, Tizi Ouzou

== Final ==
Kickoff times are in local time.

28 June 2007

MC Alger	1–0	USM Alger
Fodil Hadjadj 70'	Report

Stade 5 Juillet, Alger
Attendance: 70,000
Referee: Mohamed Zekrini

== Champions ==
Algerian Cup
2006–07 Winners

MC Alger
6th Title
