= Olympique Noisy-le-Sec =

Football club

- Full name: Olympique Noisy-le-Sec Banlieue 93
- Founded: 1943
- Ground: Stade Salvador-Allende; Noisy-le-Sec
- Capacity: 1,500
- Chairman: Jean Frederic Pianelli
- Manager: Mohamed Djouadi
- League: Regional 1, Paris Île-de-France
- 2018–19: National 3 Group L, 14th (relegated)
- Website: http://www.olympique-noisylesec.com/
Home colours	Away colours	Third colours

Olympique Noisy-le-Sec Banlieue 93 is an association football team based in Noisy-le-Sec, France, founded in 1943. They are currently playing in Regional 1, Paris Île-de-France, the sixth tier in the French football league system, following relegation from Championnat National 3 in 2019. They play at the Stade Salvador Allende in Noisy-le-Sec.

Between 1997 and 2002 Noisy-le-Sec played in the French third division, the Championnat National.

== Current squad ==
As of 6 February 2012

Note: Flags indicate national team as defined under FIFA eligibility rules; some limited exceptions apply. Players may hold more than one non-FIFA nationality.

No.	Pos.	Nation	Player
—	GK	(France) FRA	Alexandre Bonnard
—	GK	(France) FRA	Mamady Diallo
—	GK	(France) FRA	Karmi Sidibé
—	DF	(France) FRA	Aurélien Moukori
—	DF	(France) FRA	Ismaël Gakou
—	DF	(France) FRA	Moro Gassama
—	DF	(France) FRA	Yacine Hamada
—	DF	(France) FRA	Joël Makiadi
—	DF	(France) FRA	Isteeve Michaud
—	DF	(France) FRA	Christopher Patricio Soares
—	DF	(France) FRA	Kossy Talon
—	DF	(Algeria) ALG	Slimane Raho
—	MF	(France) FRA	Jamel Chebab
—	MF	(Mali) MLI	Hadama Fofana
—	MF	(Algeria) ALG	Fahem Ouslati

No.	Pos.	Nation	Player
—	MF	(Algeria) ALG	Khaled Makhloufi
—	MF	(France) FRA	Maka Coulibaly
—	MF	(France) FRA	Mouloud Meghezel
—	MF	(France) FRA	Issaga N'Diaye
—	MF	(France) FRA	Harold Nkongi
—	MF	(Algeria) ALG	Mohammed Rahoui
—	MF	(Senegal) SEN	Ibrahima Sagna
—	MF	(France) FRA	Rachid Yatim
—	FW	(France) FRA	Sophian Belaidi
—	FW	(France) FRA	Pierrick Noël
—	FW	(Guinea) GUI	Mohamed Condé
—	FW	(France) FRA	Olivier Ebuya
—	FW	(France) FRA	Albin Hodza
—	FW	(France) FRA	Godmer Mabouba
—	FW	(France) FRA	Yaniss Sandjak
