= Saïd Hamrani =

Algerian footballer (born 1962)

Personal information
- Full name: Saïd Hamrani
- Date of birth: February 26, 1962 (age 64)
- Place of birth: Boghni, Algeria

Youth career
- 1978–1979: DC Boghni
- 1979–1982: JS Kabylie

Senior career*
| Years | Team | Apps | (Gls) |
| 1982–1984 | JS Azazga | | |
| 1984–1988 | JS Bordj Ménaïel | | |
| 1988–1990 | JS Kabylie | | |

International career
| 1988 | Algeria | 4 | (1) |
- * Club domestic league appearances and goals

Saïd Hamrani (Arabic: سعيد حمراني, born February 26, 1962) is a former Algerian international footballer.

On October 29, 1988, Hamrani made his international debut for Algeria in a friendly against Angola, scoring a goal on his debut in a 1–1 draw. In total, he won 4 caps for Algeria, scoring 1 goal.
