= Mohamed Yahi =

Algerian footballer (born 1985)

Mohamed Yahi (born October 29, 1985, in Tizi Ouzou) is an Algerian footballer. He currently plays as a defender for NA Hussein Dey in the Algerian Championnat National.

== Club career ==
- 2005-2007 JS Kabylie (Algeria)
- 2007–present NA Hussein Dey (Algeria)

== Honours ==
- Won the Algerian League once with JS Kabylie in 2006
