= Reda Benhadj Djillali =

Algerian football player (born 1978)

Personal information
- Full name: Reda Benhadj Djillali
- Date of birth: 31 May 1978 (age 48)
- Place of birth: El Attaf, Algeria
- Height: 1.85 m (6 ft 1 in)
- Position: Midfielder

Team information
- Current team: CS Constantine
- Number: 8

Senior career*
Years	Team	Apps	(Gls)
1998–2001	RC Kouba	-	(-)
2001–2002	USM Blida	-	(-)
2002–2004	ASO Chlef	-	(-)
2004–2006	JS Kabylie	34	(4)
2006–2008	OMR El Annasser	-	(-)
2008–2009	USM Annaba	-	(-)
2009–2011	MC El Eulma	28	(3)
2011–	CS Constantine	11	(3)
2012	→ Najran (loan)	9	(1)
- * Club domestic league appearances and goals as of 00:00, 23 July 2012 (UTC)

Reda Benhadj Djillali (Arabic: رضا بلحاج جيللالي; born 31 May 1978) is an Algerian football player. He currently plays for Algerian Ligue Professionnelle 1 club CS Constantine.

== Club career ==
On 10 September 2011 Benhadj Djillali made his debut for CS Constantine as a 73rd-minute substitute in the opening round of the 2011–12 Algerian Ligue Professionnelle 1 against JSM Béjaïa. A week later, he scored his first goal for the club in a 3–1 loss to ASO Chlef.

On 3 January 2012 Benhadj Djillali was loaned out to Saudi Arabian club Najran SC until the end of the season.

== Honours ==
- Won the Algerian Championnat National once with JS Kabylie in 2006
