= Yacine Amaouche =

Algerian footballer (born 1979)

Personal information
- Full name: Yacine Amaouche
- Date of birth: 26 June 1979 (age 47)
- Place of birth: Amizour, Algeria
- Height: 1.71 m (5 ft 7 in)
- Position: Midfielder

Senior career*
| Years | Team | Apps | (Gls) |
| 1995–1997 | SS Sidi Aich | | |
| 1997–2002 | JSM Bejaïa | 37 | (7) |
| 2002–2003 | JS Kabylie | 21 | (5) |
| 2003–2004 | JSM Bejaïa | 12 | (0) |
| 2004–2005 | GC Mascara | 21 | (1) |
| 2005–2006 | MO Béjaïa | | |
| 2006–2007 | CA Batna | 19 | (0) |
| 2007–2009 | JS Kabylie | 35 | (5) |
| 2009– | MSP Batna | | |

International career^{‡}
| 2000–2003 | Algeria | 4 | (1) |
- * Club domestic league appearances and goals as of July 2009 ‡ National team caps and goals as of November 2009

Yacine Amaouche (Kabyle: Yasin Amaɛuc; born 26 June 1979) is a former footballer. He last played as a forward for MSP Batna in the Algerian league.

Amaouche was a member of Algeria's squad at the 2000 African Cup of Nations, but did not play any matches at the tournament. He scored one international goal, which came against Uganda in 2002.

== National team statistics ==
Algeria national team
| Year | Apps | Goals |
|---|---|---|
| 2000 | 1 | 0 |
| 2001 | 0 | 0 |
| 2002 | 2 | 1 |
| 2003 | 1 | 0 |
| Total | 4 | 1 |

== Honours ==
- Won the CAF Cup once in 2002 with JS Kabylie
- Won the Algerian league twice with JS Kabylie in 2004 and 2008
- Has 3 caps and 1 goal for the Algerian National Team
