= Farouk Belkaïd =

Algerian footballer (born 1977)

Farouk Belkaïd فاروق بلقايد
Personal information
- Date of birth: 14 November 1977 (age 48)
- Place of birth: Bordj Menaïel, Algeria
- Height: 1.78 m (5 ft 10 in)
- Positions: Defensive midfielder; centre back; right back

Youth career
- JS Bordj Ménaïel

Senior career*
Years	Team	Apps	(Gls)
1996–1998	JS Bordj Ménaïel		
1998–2005	JS Kabylie	141	(23)
2005–2006	USM Alger	22	(3)
2006–2008	MC Alger	42	(1)
2008–2013	ES Sétif	120	(0)
2013–2014	USM Bel Abbès	26	(0)
2014–2015	JSM Béjaïa	14	(0)

International career
2000–2005	Algeria	20	(1)
- * Club domestic league appearances and goals

Farouk Belkaïd (Arabic: فاروق بلقايد; born 14 November 1977) is an Algerian former professional footballer who played as a defensive midfielder or as a defender.

== Club career ==
Belkaïd was born in Bordj Menaïel. In 1998, he joined JS Kabylie from JS Bordj Ménaïel. During his time with the club, he won the CAF Cup three times in a row from 2000 to 2002 and also won the league title in 2004.

In 2003, Belkaïd went on trial with French club AJ Auxerre but was not signed by manager Guy Roux.

== International career ==
Belkaïd received his first call-up to the Algeria national team on 8 December 2000 for a friendly against Romania in Annaba, Algeria. He played the entire game, with the score ending 3–2 in favour of the visitors.

== Career statistics ==
=== Club ===
Appearances and goals by club, season and competition
Club	Season	League			Cup (Note: Includes the Algerian Cup)		Continental		Other		Total	
Club	Season	Division	Apps	Goals	Apps	Goals	Apps	Goals	Apps	Goals	Apps	Goals
JS Kabylie	1998–99	National 1	0	0	0	0	0	0	—		0	0
JS Kabylie	1999–2000	National 1	17	0	3	0	0	0	—		0	0
JS Kabylie	2000–01	National 1	22	2	1	1	5 (Note: All appearance(s) in CAF Cup)	0	—		28	3
JS Kabylie	2001–02	National 1	26	3	4	1	8	2	—		38	6
JS Kabylie	2002–03	National 1	27	8	1	0	4	1	—		32	9
JS Kabylie	2003–04	National 1	27	6	0	0	0	0	—		0	0
JS Kabylie	2004–05	National 1	24	5	0	0	—		—		0	0
JS Kabylie	Total		143	24	9	2	17	3	—		169	29
USM Alger	2005–06	National 1	22	2	3	0	1 (Note: All appearance(s) in Champions League)	0	—		26	2
MC Alger	2006–07	National 1	19	1	4	0	1 (Note: All appearance(s) in CAF Confederation Cup)	0	5 (Note: one appearance and one goal in Algerian Super Cup, four appearances in Arab Champions League)	1	29	2
MC Alger	2007–08	National 1	23	0	1	0	2	0	1 (Note: All appearances in Algerian Super Cup)	0	27	0
MC Alger	Total		42	1	5	0	3	0	6	1	56	2
ES Sétif	2008–09	National 1	23	0	2	0	3	0	4 (Note: All appearance(s) in Arab Champions League)	1	32	1
ES Sétif	2009–10	National 1	29	0	3	0	12 (Note: four appearances in CAF Champions League, eight appearances in CAF Confederation Cup)	0	—		44	0
ES Sétif	2010–11	Ligue 1	13	0	3	0	5	0	—		21	0
ES Sétif	2011–12	Ligue 1	24	0	5	0	2	0	—		31	0
ES Sétif	2012–13	Ligue 1	26	0	3	0	4 (Note: three appearances in CAF Champions League, one appearance in CAF Confederation Cup)	0	—		33	0
ES Sétif	Total		115	0	16	0	26	0	4	1	161	1
USM Bel Abbès	2013–14	Ligue 2	28	0	1	0	—		—		29	0
JSM Béjaïa	2014–15	Ligue 2	14	0	1	0	—		—		15	0
Career total			364	27	35	2	47	3	10	2	456	34

=== International ===
Appearances and goals by national team and year
National team	Year	Apps	Goals
Algeria	2000	1	0
Algeria	2001	6	0
Algeria	2002	4	0
Algeria	2003	5	1
Algeria	2004	3	0
Algeria	2005	1	0
Total		20	1

Farouk Belkaïd: International goals
No.	Date	Venue	Opponent	Score	Result	Competition
1	24 April 2003	Stade de la Licorne, Amiens, France	Madagascar	2–0	3–1	Friendly

== Honours ==
JS Kabylie

- CAF Cup: 2000, 2001, 2002
- Algerian Championnat National: 2003–04

MC Alger

- Algerian Cup: 2007
- Algerian Super Cup: 2006, 2007

ES Sétif

- Algerian Championnat National: 2008–09, 2011–12
- Algerian Cup: 2010, 2012
- North African Cup of Champions: 2009
- North African Super Cup: 2010
- North African Cup Winners Cup: 2010

Individual

- DZFoot d'Or: 2002
