= Kamel Marek =

Algerian footballer (born 1980)

Kamel Marek (born February 6, 1980, in Tizi Ouzou) is an Algerian footballer. He currently plays as a midfielder for USM Alger in the Algerian League.

== Club career ==
- 2004-2005 MO Béjaïa (Algeria)
- 2005-2007 JS Kabylie (Algeria)
- 2007-pres. USM Alger (Algeria)
