= Sofiane Harkat =

Algerian footballer (born 1984)

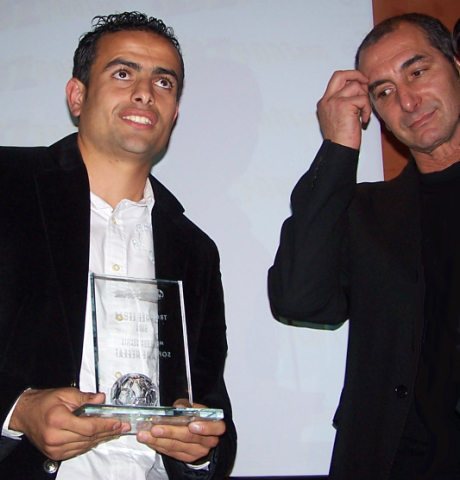
- Harkat (left) in 2006, receiving an award from Noureddine Kourichi

Personal information
- Full name: Sofiane Harkat
- Date of birth: January 26, 1984 (age 42)
- Place of birth: Algiers, Algeria
- Height: 1.84 m (6 ft 1/2 in)
- Position: Defender

Team information
- Current team: CR Belouizdad

Senior career*
Years	Team	Apps	(Gls)
2003–2005	USM El Harrach	-	(-)
2005–2008	JS Kabylie	-	(-)
2008–2009	USM Annaba	-	(-)
2009–2010	USM Alger	-	(-)
2010–2011	MC Alger	25	(0)
2012–	CR Belouizdad	0	(0)

International career
2005	Algeria U23	8	(0)
- * Club domestic league appearances and goals

Sofiane Harkat (Arabic: سفيان حركات; born January 26, 1984) is an Algerian football player who plays for CR Belouizdad in the Algerian Ligue Professionnelle 1.

== Club career ==
In August 2011, Harkat signed a one-year contract with Saudi Arabian club Al-Qadisiyah FC. However, his contract was terminated prior to the start of the season and he spent the rest of the season without a club. In February 2012, he began training with CS Constantine.

On June 17, 2012, Harkat signed a two-year contract with CR Belouizdad.

== Honours ==
=== Club ===
- MC Alger
  - Algerian Championnat National: 2009–10
