= Cheick Oumar Dabo =

Malian football player

Personal information
- Full name: Cheick Oumar Dabo
- Date of birth: 12 January 1981 (age 45)
- Place of birth: Bamako, Mali
- Height: 1.83 m (6 ft 0 in)
- Position: Striker

Senior career*
Years	Team	Apps	(Gls)
2000–2001	Djoliba		
2001–2002	Gençlerbirliği	0	(0)
2002–2004	Bucheon SK	66	(20)
2005	Dubai Club		
2006–2007	JS Kabylie	27	(17)
2007–2010	Le Havre	6	(1)
2008	→ Tours (loan)	14	(6)
2008–2009	→ Chamois Niortais (loan)	26	(2)
2010	→ Difaa El Jadida (loan)	13	(4)
2010–2011	Alahly Benghazi	11	(1)
2011–2012	SC Angérien		

International career^{‡}
2001–2007	Mali	17	(7)
- * Club domestic league appearances and goals as of 20:35, 21 August 2010 (UTC) ‡ National team caps and goals as of 22:37, 18 December 2008 (UTC)

Cheick Oumar Dabo (born 12 January 1981 in Bamako) is a Malian football player.

== Club career ==
=== Bucheon SK ===
Dabo joined Bucheon SK in 2002. One of very few Africans playing in South Korea, Dabo earned a spot in the K-League All-Stars Soccer in 2002 and 2003, scoring in both games. He was selected for the team in 2004 as well, though was an unused substitute in that game. In the All-Stars Soccer, he played against Lee Dong-Gook and Lee Young-Pyo (in 2002) who both went on to play in the Premier League in England.

=== JS Kabylie ===
Dabo would go on to score a penalty against Asante Kotoko in his debut for JS Kabylie. In the CAF Champions League 2006 Dabo scored 3 goals, 2 of which were against Al Ahly of Egypt. It was in the CAF Champions League 2006. In the CAF Champions League 2007 he scored 2 goals against OS Balantas of Guinea-Bissau. He scored twice against Mangasport of Gabon and once in the away leg (3–1 loss) and once in the home leg (3–0 win). He scored once against Cotonsport of Cameroon and had an assist on the other to send Kabylie to the Quarterfinals. He now has 5 goals in the CAF Champions League 2007. He was voted player of the month in February, March, April and May in the Algerian Championnat National and eventually was voted MVP of the league. Dabo ended as the top scorer in the League with 17 league goals in 27 appearances (2 as a sub). He was the first foreign player ever to be top scorer in Algeria. On 1 July it was announced that Dabo will join Le Havre in France's Ligue 2, he will join them after his last match with JSK, against ES Sahel in the Champions League. Shortly after this announcement, Dabo was given the captain's armband for JSK's match against FAR Rabat, which was his last match in which he scored twice. Dabo was the first ever non-Algerian to be captain for JSK.

=== Le Havre ===
Dabo made his debut for Le Havre on 20 August 2007, coming on as a sub for Nikola Nikezić against Nantes. He scored his first goal and got his first assist in the same game, after coming on as a sub against Ajaccio on 28 September. Le Havre were champions of Ligue 2 in 2007/08, Dabo's first year, but Dabo only made six appearances that season, scoring one goal. Despite having scored one goal and getting one assist in 180 minutes for Le Havre in 2007, Dabo was never again given a chance to prove himself and was released in the summer of 2010 after three loans, two of which could be considered successful.

=== Tours ===
Dabo was loaned to Championnat National side Tours on 29 January 2008 after a lack of first team opportunities at Le Havre. He scored on his debut in a 4–2 win against Cherbourg. Dabo's five game scoring streak near the end of the season helped Tours to a 2nd-place finish in 2007/08 to ensure their promotion back to Ligue 2. Despite interest from Tours and Dabo, Dabo did not make the move to Tours in the summer of 2008, due to Dabo's high price tag set by president of Le Havre, Jean-Pierre Louvel.

=== Niort ===
Dabo was again loaned to a Championnat National side on 29 August 2008. This time it was Niort. He made his debut against Cherbourg in a 3–3 draw on 12 September, coming on in the 46th minute for Romain Jacuzzi. He had a rough time for the next few months with a combination of playing more on the wing while dealing with a foot injury and then eventually injuring his ankle and needing arthroscopic surgery to repair it. He finished the season with two goals and Niort were relegated.

=== El Jadida ===
Despite scoring three goals (and one assist) in three matches for Le Havre's reserves at the start of the 2009–10 season, Dabo was not considered for Le Havre's senior team. On 14 December 2009, Difaa El Jadida signed the Malian forward on loan until the end of the season. He made his debut for DHJ on 13 February in an African Champions League match against OS Balantas, and scored twice in the return leg two weeks later. Dabo scored on his league debut for DHJ against FAR Rabat on 18 February 2010. At the end of the season, Dabo scored four league goals and four goals in the Champions League to total eight goals in seventeen matches for DHJ, who finished third. When combined with his goals for Le Havre's reserves, he scored eleven goals in twenty matches in 2009–10.

=== Alahly Benghazi ===
Dabo joined Al Ahly Benghazi of the Libyan Premier League in the summer of 2010 after leaving Le Havre. He scored on his debut against Al Hilal on 18 August.

=== Clubs ===
He played for Konate then for Djoliba in Bamako, Mali's capital, Gençlerbirliği in the Süper Lig and then Bucheon SK in the K-League. He left Dubai Club, in the UAE League in the summer of 2006, and he joined Kabylie of Algerian Championnat National.

== International career ==
Dabo was in Mali's African Nations Cup Squad in 2002 (the year Mali hosted the tournament). He came on for Mali in the 79th minute for Mamadou Bagayoko in their 0–1 loss to Nigeria. Dabo's great play for Kabylie earned him a call up to the national team for their African Nations Cup Qualifier against Benin on 3 June 2007 and against Sierra Leone on 16 June 2007. Dabo started both matches.

== International goals ==
Results list Mali's goal tally first. Cheick Oumar Dabo: International Goals Dabo has scored 7 goals for Mali, these are the only ones I could find.
#	Date	Venue	Opponent	Score	Result	Competition
1	7 April 2001	Stade Modibo Keita, Bamako, Mali	Liberia	3–0	Win	WAFU Qualifier
2	3 November 2001	Stade du 26 Mars, Bamako, Mali	Mauritania	3–2	Win	Amilcar Cabral Cup
3	5 November 2001	Stade Amari Daou, Ségou, Mali	Guinea-Bissau	2–0	Win	Amilcar Cabral Cup
4	11 November 2001	Stade du 26 Mars, Bamako, Mali	Guinea-Bissau	2–1	Win	Amilcar Cabral Cup 3rd place Game

== Honors ==
- K-League All-Star: 2002, 2003
- Algerian Championnat National Top Scorer: 2006/07
- Algerian Championnat National Most Valuable Player: 2006/07
- Ligue 2 Champion: 2007/08 (only made 6 appearances)

== Additional Links ==
- ~~Official Fan Site~~ – ~~Site dedicated to Dabo in English and French.~~ (site moved to Facebook)
