= Fahem Ouslati =

Algerian footballer (born 1986)

Personal information
- Full name: Fahem Ouslati
- Date of birth: March 14, 1986 (age 40)
- Place of birth: Kouba, Algiers, Algeria
- Position: Midfielder

Team information
- Current team: Olympique Noisy-le-Sec

Senior career*
Years	Team	Apps	(Gls)
2004–2005	CR Belouizdad	20	(1)
2005–2007	JS Kabylie	-	(-)
2007–2008	MO Béjaïa	-	(-)
2008–2009	MC Saïda	-	(-)
2009–2010	MO Constantine	-	(-)
2011–	Olympique Noisy-le-Sec	-	(-)

International career
2002–2003	Algeria U17	2	(0)
2005	Algeria U23	5	(0)
- * Club domestic league appearances and goals

Fahem Ouslati (Arabic: فاهم أوسلاتي; born April 14, 1986, in Kouba, Algiers) is an Algerian footballer who is currently playing for Olympique Noisy-le-Sec in the Championnat de France amateur 2.

== Club career ==
After a breakout season with CR Belouizdad in 2004/2005, he was involved in a transfer dispute between his club and JS Kabylie after signing a contract with both clubs. He was eventually declared a JS Kabylie player but was suspended for 6 months by the Algerian FA. He failed to make an impact with the team and signed with MO Béjaïa in 2007.

He has been capped for Algeria at the junior level, including playing at the 2005 Mediterranean Games in Almeria, Spain and the 2005 Islamic Solidarity Games in Jeddah, Saudi Arabia.

== Honours ==
- Won the Algerian league once with JS Kabylie in 2006
