= Wassiou Oladipupo =

Beninese footballer (born 1983)

Personal information
- Full name: Wassiou Okalawom Oladipupo
- Date of birth: 17 December 1983 (age 42)
- Place of birth: Abomey, Benin
- Height: 1.75 m (5 ft 9 in)
- Position: Midfielder

Senior career*
Years	Team	Apps	(Gls)
2002–2003	JS Pobé		
2003–2005	Olympic Zaouia		
2005–2008	JS Kabylie		
2009–2012	Soleil FC		
2012–2014	Feni Soccer Club		

International career
2002–2008	Benin	15	(1)
- * Club domestic league appearances and goals

Wassiou Okalawon Oladipupo(born 17 December 1983) is a Beninese former professional footballer who played as a midfielder.

== Club career ==
Oladipupo was born in Abomey. He played for JS Kabylie in the Algerian Championnat National.

== International career ==
Oladipupo has made several appearances for the Benin national football team. He was part of the Beninese 2004 African Nations Cup team, who finished bottom of their group in the first round of competition, thus failing to secure qualification for the quarter-finals. He was also a member of the Beninese 2008 African Nations Cup team.

== Honours ==
JS Kabylie

- Algerian Championnat National: 2006, 2008

Olympic Zaouia

- Libyan Premier League: 2004
