= Bouabdellah Daoud =

Algerian footballer (born 1978)

Personal information
- Date of birth: February 3, 1978 (age 48)
- Place of birth: Oran, Algeria
- Height: 1.82 m (6 ft 0 in)
- Position: Forward

Senior career*
Years	Team	Apps	(Gls)
1996–2000	CR Témouchent	-	(-)
2000–2001	IRB Maghnia	-	(-)
2001–2004	MC Oran	74	(25)
2004–2005	Espérance ST	-	(1)
2005	JS Kabylie	8	(2)
2005–2007	MC Oran	-	(-)
2007–2008	WA Tlemcen	-	(-)
2008–2009	ASO Chlef	-	(-)
2009–2011	MC Oran	26	(4)
2011–2012	RC Kouba	4	(4)

International career
2002–2006	Algeria	19	(0)
- * Club domestic league appearances and goals

Bouabdellah Daoud (born February 3, 1978) is an Algerian footballer.

Daoud has 19 caps for the Algerian National Team.

== National team statistics ==
Algeria national team
Year	Apps	Goals
2002	4	0
2003	9	0
2004	5	0
2005	0	0
2006	1	0
Total	19	0
