= Nabil Mazari =

Algerian footballer (born 1984)

Personal information
- Full name: Nabil Mazari
- Date of birth: 18 February 1984 (age 42)
- Place of birth: Tizi Ouzou, Algeria
- Height: 1.90 m (6 ft 3 in)
- Position: Goalkeeper

Youth career
- JS Kabylie

Senior career*
Years	Team	Apps	(Gls)
2003–2015	JS Kabylie	35	(-)

International career
2005	Algeria U23		
- * Club domestic league appearances and goals

Nabil Mazari (Arabic: نبيل مزاري; born 18 February 1984) is an Algerian football player. He currently plays as a goalkeeper for JS Kabylie in the Algerian league.

== Club career ==
- 2003-pres. JS Kabylie Algeria

== Honours ==
- Won the Algerian League three times with JS Kabylie in 2004, 2006 and 2008
