= Chérif Abdeslam =

Algerian footballer (born 1978)

Personal information
- Full name: Chérif Abdeslam
- Date of birth: 1 September 1978 (age 48)
- Place of birth: Hussein Dey, Algiers, Algeria
- Height: 1.83 m (6 ft 0 in)
- Position: Midfielder

Team information
- Current team: NA Hussein Dey (assistant)

Senior career*
Years	Team	Apps	(Gls)
1999–2006	NA Hussein Dey	85	(4)
2006–2009	JS Kabylie	73	(0)
2009–2010	USM Annaba	24	(0)
2010–2012	ASO Chlef	40	(2)
2012	AS Khroub		
2013–2015	NA Hussein Dey		

International career^{‡}
2005–2009	Algeria	8	(1)
- * Club domestic league appearances and goals as of 00:00, March 15, 2012 (UTC) ‡ National team caps and goals as of 00:00, February 23, 2012 (UTC)

Chérif Abdeslam (Kabyle: Crif Σebdesslam; born 1 September 1978) is a Kabyle Algerian retired football player.

He has previously played for IR Husseïn Dey and NA Husseïn Dey, JS Kabylie and USM Annaba.

== International career ==
Abdeslam has eight caps for the Algerian national team with the latest coming against Uruguay in August 2009.

== Honours ==
- Won the Algerian Ligue Professionnelle 1 twice:
  - Once with JS Kabylie in 2008
  - Once with ASO Chlef in 2011
- Has 8 caps for the Algerian National Team
