= Fawzi Moussouni =

Algerian footballer (born 1972)

Fawzi Moussouni (born April 8, 1972, in Algiers, Algeria) is a former Algerian international footballer.

== Club career ==
- 1994-2001 JS Kabylie (Algeria)
- 2001-2002 US Creteil (France)
- 2002-2003 NA Hussein Dey (Algeria)
- 2003-2005 JS El Biar (Algeria)
- 2005-2005 JS Kabylie (Algeria)
- 2005-2008 OMR El Annasser (Algeria)
- 2008-2009 USM Bel-Abbès (Algeria)
- 2009–2010. USO Amizour (Algeria)

== Honours ==
- Won the CAF Cup once with JS Kabylie in 2000
- Has 10 caps and 1 goal for the Algeria national football team.
