= Noureddine Drioueche =

Algerian footballer (born 1973)

Personal information
- Full name: Noureddine Drioueche
- Date of birth: October 27, 1973 (age 53)
- Place of birth: Meftah, Algeria
- Height: 1.85 m (6 ft 1 in)
- Position: Defender

Team information
- Current team: JS Kabylie
- Number: 22

Senior career*
Years	Team	Apps	(Gls)
1990–1993	WR Meftah		
1993–1995	MB Tablat		
1995–1996	USM El Harrach		
1996–1998	JS Bordj Ménaïel		
1998–2003	JS Kabylie		
2003–2004	Al-Arabi		
2004–2007	JS Kabylie		
2007–	MC Saïda		

International career^{‡}
2000–2003	Algeria	13	(0)
- * Club domestic league appearances and goals ‡ National team caps and goals as of December 30, 2006

Noureddine Drioueche (born October 27, 1973, in Meftah, Blida Province) is an Algerian footballer. He currently plays as a defender for MC Saïda in the Algerian league.

== Honours ==
- Won the CAF Cup three times with JS Kabylie in 2000, 2001 and 2002
- Won the Algerian league two times with JS Kabylie in 2004 and 2006
- Has 13 caps for the Algerian national team
