= Ali Bendebka =

Algerian football midfielder (born 1976)

Personal information
- Date of birth: 13 September 1976 (age 50)
- Place of birth: Kouba, Algeria
- Height: 1.85 m (6 ft 1 in)
- Position: Midfielder

Senior career*
Years	Team	Apps	(Gls)
1995–2005	NA Hussein Dey		
2005–2006	US Biskra		
2007	JS Kabylie		
2008	MO Béjaïa		
2008–2009	MSP Batna		

International career^{‡}
1999	Algeria U23	1	(0)
1999–2003	Algeria	3	(0)
- * Club domestic league appearances and goals as of June 1, 2007 ‡ National team caps and goals as of June 1, 2007

Ali Bendebka (born 13 September 1976) is an Algerian football midfielder. He currently plays for MSP Batna in the Algerian league.

Bendebka spent much of his career with NA Hussein Dey in the Algerian Championnat National. He also has made five appearances for the Algeria national football team.

== National team statistics ==
Algeria national team
Year	Apps	Goals
1999	1	0
2000	0	0
2001	0	0
2002	0	0
2003	2	0
Total	3	0
