= JS Bordj Ménaïel =

Algerian football club

- Full name: Jeunesse Sportive de Bordj Ménaïel
- Founded: 1932
- Ground: Salah Takdjerad Stadium
- Capacity: 7,000
- League: Interregional League
- 2025–26: Ligue 2, Group Centre-east, 14th of 16 (relegated)
| Home colours | Away colours |

Jeunesse Sportive de Bordj Ménaïel, (Arabic: الشبيبة الرياضية لبرج منايل), known as JS Bordj Ménaïel or simply JSBM for short, is an Algerian football club based in the city of Bordj Ménaïel, Algeria. The club was founded in 1932 and its colours are red and black. Their home stadium, Salah Takdjerad Stadium, has a capacity of 7,000 spectators. The club is currently playing in the Interregional League.

== History ==
The club spent 13 seasons playing in the Algerian top flight, with their last season being in 1995–96. The club's best finish was in the 1993–1994 season when they finished second to champions US Chaouia, who had the same number of points but a better goal differential.

In 1987, the club reached the final of the Algerian Cup where they lost to eventual champions USM El Harrach 1–0.

In 1995, the club played in the CAF Cup. In the first round, they beat Burkinabé side Union Sportive des Forces Armées 6–3 on aggregate, after winning the home leg 5–1 and losing the return leg 2–1. In the second round, they lost 3–3 on the away goals rule to Tunisian club Etoile du Sahel, after beating them 3–1 at home and losing 2–0 on the road.

On June 25, 2022, JS Bordj Ménaïel were promoted to the Algerian Ligue 2.

== Achievements ==
- Algerian Championnat National

Runner-up (1): 1993–94

- Algerian Cup

Runner-up (1): 1986–87

== Performance in CAF competitions ==
- CAF Cup: 1 appearance

1995 – Second Round

== Former players ==
A number of the club's former players have gone on to play for neighboring JS Kabylie and achieve international success. The most recent player to make the switch is Algerian international Fawzi Chaouchi who played at the 2010 FIFA World Cup.

- (Algeria) Farouk Belkaïd
- (Algeria) Abdelhak Benchikha
- (Algeria) Lounés Bendahmane
- (Algeria) Bachir Boudjelid
- (Algeria) Fawzi Chaouchi
- (Algeria) Karim Doudène
- (Algeria) Noureddine Drioueche
- (Algeria) Saïd Hamrani
- (Algeria) Lounes Laouzai
- (Algeria) Salah Mohamed Samadi

== See also ==
- League Boumerdès Football Association
