= Lamara Douicher =

Algerian footballer (born 1980)

Personal information
- Full name: Lamara Douicher
- Date of birth: March 10, 1980 (age 46)
- Place of birth: Tizi Ouzou, Algeria
- Height: 1.78 m (5 ft 10 in)
- Position: Midfielder

Senior career*
Years	Team	Apps	(Gls)
1992–1997	NR Béni Douala	-	(-276)
1997–2011	JS Kabylie	-	(-25)
2011–2012	USM Blida	26	(0)
2012–2013	AS Khroub	0	(0)
2013–2014	NR Béni Douala	0	(0)
- * Club domestic league appearances and goals as of 00:00, August 13, 2012 (UTC)

Lamara Douicher (born March 10, 1980) is an Algerian former footballer who played for USM Blida in the Algerian Ligue Professionnelle 2.

== Honours ==
- Won the Algerian Cup with JS Kabylie in 2011
- Won the Algerian league three times with JS Kabylie in 2004, 2006 and 2008
- Won the CAF Cup three times JS Kabylie in 2000, 2001 and 2002
