= Mohamed Benouza =

Algerian football referee

- Full name: Mohamed Abderrezak Benouza
- Born: September 26, 1972 (age 54); Oran, Algeria
- Height: 1.87 m (6 ft 2 in)

Domestic
Years	League	Role
2000–	Algerian Ligue 1	Referee

International
Years	League	Role
2001–2016	FIFA listed	Referee

Mohamed Abderrezak Benouza (Arabic: محمد بنوزة; born 26 September 1972 in Oran) is an Algerian football referee who currently resides in Oran. He has been a full international referee for FIFA since 2001.

== Career ==
He was selected as a referee for the 2007 FIFA Under 20 World Cup in Canada, where he refereed the match between Panama and the Democratic People's Republic of Korea on 30 June 2007. He then took charge of the game between New Zealand and Mexico on 8 July 2007.

Benouza was also selected for the Africa Cup of Nations of 2006 in Egypt, 2008 in Ghana, 2010 in Angola, 2012 in Gabon and Equatorial Guinea and 2013 in South Africa.

He was preselected as a referee for the 2010 FIFA World Cup. Benouza was called up to officiate at the finals, but was removed following the failure of a fitness test by his assistant referees.

== See also ==
- List of football referees
