= Nabil Hemani =

Algerian footballer (1979-2014)

Personal information
- Full name: Nabil Hemani
- Date of birth: 1 September 1979
- Place of birth: Boghni, Tizi Ouzou, Algeria
- Date of death: 12 June 2014 (aged 34)
- Place of death: Algiers, Algeria
- Height: 1.79 m (5 ft 10 1/2 in)
- Position: Forward

Senior career*
Years	Team	Apps	(Gls)
2004–2005	OMR El Annasser	24	(11)
2005–2008	JS Kabylie	72	(22)
2008–2011	ES Sétif	63	(30)
2011–2012	JS Kabylie	26	(7)
2012–2013	CS Constantine	18	(0)
2013–2014	NA Hussein Dey		

International career^{‡}
2008	Algeria	5	(0)
- * Club domestic league appearances and goals as of 00:00, 21 September 2012 (UTC) ‡ National team caps and goals as of 00:00, 21 September 2012 (UTC)

Nabil Hemani (1 September 1979 – 12 June 2014) was an Algerian footballer. He played as a forward for several teams in the Algerian Ligue Professionnelle 1 and capped with Algeria at senior level.

== Club career ==
On 12 July 2011 Hemani signed a one-year contract with JS Kabylie, returning to the club after three seasons with ES Sétif.

== International career ==
In January 2008, he was called up by Rabah Saadane to the Algeria A' national team for a 5-day training camp.

On 25 May 2008 he was called up by Rabah Saadane to the Algerian National Team for a set of African Cup of Nations and World Cup qualifiers, replacing Kamel Ghilas on the team.
