= Lounès Gaouaoui =

Algerian footballer (born 1977)

Personal information
- Date of birth: 28 September 1977 (age 49)
- Place of birth: Tizi Ouzou, Algeria
- Height: 1.88 m (6 ft 2 in)
- Position: Goalkeeper

Youth career
- 1990–1997: USM Drâa Ben Khedda

Senior career*
Years	Team	Apps	(Gls)
1997–1999	USM Drâa Ben Khedda		
1999–2007	JS Kabylie	156	(0)
2007–2008	WA Tlemcen	42	(0)
2008–2009	USM Annaba	26	(0)
2009–2010	ASO Chlef	21	(0)
2010–2011	USM Blida	26	(0)
2012–2013	AS Khroub		
2013–2014	CS Constantine	2	(0)
2014–2015	MSP Batna		

International career
2001–2010	Algeria	48	(0)

Managerial career
- 2013–2014: CS Constantine (interim coach)
- 2015–2018: JS Kabylie (GK coach)
- 2018: Algeria (GK coach)
- 2018–2019: JS Kabylie (youth coordinator)
- 2019–2021: CA Bordj Bou Arréridj (GK coach)
- 2021–2022: NA Hussein Dey (GK coach)
- 2022: USM Alger (GK coach)
- 2023–2024: JS Kabylie (GK coach)
- * Club domestic league appearances and goals

Lounès Gaouaoui (Arabic: الوناس قواوي) (born 28 September 1977) is an Algerian former footballer who played as a goalkeeper.

== Playing career ==
Gaouaoui was a member of the Algerian national team that lost in the quarter-finals at the 2004 African Cup of Nations. He was until recently Algeria's first-choice goalkeeper and had played in all of his country's main qualifiers for the 2010 FIFA World Cup, but suspension and an attack of appendicitis forced him respectively to miss his country's World Cup qualification playoff against Egypt and the 2010 African Cup of Nations which both saw Faouzi Chaouchi replace him. This lengthy period of inactivity eventually cost him his spot as first-choice goalkeeper for the World Cup Finals, despite being named in the final squad.

== Coaching career ==
Gaouaoui started his coaching career with CS Constantine as a playing assistant manager. In December 2013, he took over the club as a caretaker manager. He was in charge for two games, before being replaced in the beginning of January 2014 and then continued at the club as a playing assistant manager.

In October 2015, he returned to JS Kabylie as a goalkeeper coach. He left the club in March 2018 and was hired by the national team of Algeria as a goalkeeper coach.

In October 2019, he was hired as a goalkeeper coach for CA Bordj Bou Arréridj.

In 2002 he was the goalkeeping coach of USM Alger.

== Career statistics ==
=== Club ===
Appearances and goals by club, season and competition
Club	Season	League			Algerian Cup		Africa		Total	
Club	Season	Division	Apps	Goals	Apps	Goals	Apps	Goals	Apps	Goals
WA Tlemcen	2006–07	Championnat National	15	0			–			0
WA Tlemcen	2007–08	Championnat National	26	0	6	0	–		27	0
USM Annaba	2008–09	Championnat National	26	0	1	0	–		27	0
ASO Chlef	2009–10	Championnat National	21	0	3	1	–		24	1
USM Blida	2010–11	Ligue 1	26	0			–		26	0
CS Constantine	2012–13	Ligue 1	2	0			–		2	0
Career total										

=== International ===
Appearances and goals by national team and year
National team	Year	Apps	Goals
Algeria	2001	1	0
Algeria	2002	8	0
Algeria	2003	3	0
Algeria	2004	6	0
Algeria	2005	2	0
Algeria	2006	5	0
Algeria	2007	6	0
Algeria	2008	9	0
Algeria	2009	8	0
Algeria	2010	1	0
Total		49	0

== Honours ==
- Won the Algerian league twice in 2004 and 2006 with JS Kabylie
- Runner up in the Algerian league twice in 2002 and 2005 with JS Kabylie
- Finalist of the Algerian Cup in 2004 with JS Kabylie
- Won the CAF Cup three times in 2000, 2001 and 2002 with JS Kabylie
