= Rahim Meftah =

Algerian footballer (born 1980)

Rahim Meftah (born August 15, 1980, in Tizi Ouzou) is an Algerian former professional footballer who played as a defender.

== Club career ==
- 1999–2007 JS Kabylie
- 2007–2008 USM Alger

== Honours ==
- Won the Algerian league twice with JS Kabylie in 2004 and 2006
- Won the CAF Cup twice with JS Kabylie in 2001 and 2002
