= Brahim Zafour =

Algerian footballer (born 1977)

Personal information
- Full name: Brahim Zafour
- Date of birth: 30 November 1977 (age 48)
- Place of birth: Tizi Ouzou, Algeria
- Height: 1.85 m (6 ft 1 in)
- Position: Defender

Youth career
- 1990–1998: JS Kabylie

Senior career*
Years	Team	Apps	(Gls)
1998–2005	JS Kabylie	136	(9)
2005–2006	Al-Siliya	?	(?)
2006–2008	JS Kabylie	39	(0)
2008–2015	JSM Béjaïa	138	(4)

International career^{‡}
1998–2005	Algeria	28	(1)
- * Club domestic league appearances and goals as of October 2013 ‡ National team caps and goals as of November 2009

Brahim Zafour (in kabyle: Brahim Zafur; born 30 November 1977) is a former Algerian football player.

He was a member of the Algerian 2004 African Nations Cup team, who finished second in their group in the first round of competition before being defeated by Morocco in the quarter-finals.

== National team statistics ==
Algeria national team
Year	Apps	Goals
1998	1	0
1999	0	0
2000	0	0
2001	3	0
2002	7	0
2003	6	0
2004	9	1
2005	2	0
Total	28	1

== Honours ==
- Won the CAF Cup three times in 2000, 2001 and 2002 with JS Kabylie
- Won the Algerian league twice in 2004 and 2008 with JS Kabylie
- Runner up in the Algerian league twice in 2002 and 2005 with JS Kabylie
- Finalist of the Algerian Cup in 2004 with JS Kabylie
- Finalist of the North African Cup Winners Cup in 2009 North African Cup Winners Cup
