= Nassim Hamlaoui =

Algerian footballer (born 1981)

Personal information
- Date of birth: February 25, 1981 (age 45)
- Place of birth: Tizi Ouzou, Algeria
- Height: 1.76 m (5 ft 9 in)
- Position: Midfielder

Senior career*
Years	Team	Apps	(Gls)
2000–2007	JS Kabylie	89	(5)
2007–2009	USM Annaba	50	(1)
2009–2012	JSM Béjaïa	61	(1)

International career^{‡}
2004	Algeria	1	(0)
- * Club domestic league appearances and goals as of June 1, 2012 ‡ National team caps and goals as of June 1, 2007

Nassim Hamlaoui (born 25 February 1981) is an Algerian football midfielder. He last played for USM Annaba in the Algerian league.

Hamlaoui made one appearance for the Algeria national football team in 2004.

== Honours ==
- Won the CAF Cup three times with JS Kabylie in 2000, 2001 and 2002
- Won the Algerian League two times with JS Kabylie in 2004 and 2006
