= 2008–09 JS Kabylie season =

JS Kabylie
2008–09 season
- President: Mohand Chérif Hannachi
- Head Coach: Alexandru Moldovan (from 22 June 2008); Younès Ifticen (from 9 August 2008); Jean-Christian Lang (from 9 December 2008)
- Stadium: Stade du 1^{er} Novembre 1954
- National 1: Runners-up
- Algerian Cup: Round of 64
- CAF Confederation Cup: Group stage
- CAF Champions League: First round
- Top goalscorer: League: Adlène Bensaïd (9 goals); All: Adlène Bensaïd (10 goals)

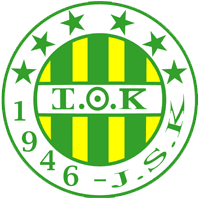

The 2008–09 season was JS Kabylie's 44th season in the Algerian top flight, They competed in National 1, the Algerian Cup, the CAF Confederation Cup and the Champions League.

== Squad list ==
Players and squad numbers last updated on 18 November 2008.
Note: Flags indicate national team as has been defined under FIFA eligibility rules. Players may hold more than one non-FIFA nationality.

No.	Nat.	Position	Name	Date of birth (age)	Signed from
Goalkeepers
	(Algeria)	GK	Nabil Mazari	18 February 1984 (aged 24)	(Algeria) Youth system
	(Algeria)	GK	Mourad Berrefane	18 March 1986 (aged 22)	(Algeria) Youth system
	(Algeria)	GK	Faouzi Chaouchi	5 December 1984 (aged 24)	(Algeria) JS Bordj Ménaïel
Defenders
	(Algeria)	CB	Koceila Berchiche	5 August 1985 (aged 23)	(Algeria) RC Kouba
	(Mali)	CB	Demba Barry	4 November 1987 (aged 21)	(Mali) AS Real Bamako
	(Algeria)	LB	Nassim Oussalah	8 October 1981 (aged 27)	(Algeria) MO Béjaïa
	(Mali)	CB	Idrissa Coulibaly	19 December 1987 (aged 21)	(Mali) Centre Salif Keita
	(Algeria)	CB	Essaïd Belkalem	1 January 1989 (aged 20)	(Algeria) Youth system
	(Algeria)		Farid Bellabès	20 October 1985 (aged 23)	(Algeria) MC Oran
	(Algeria)	RB	Mohamed Rabie Meftah	5 May 1985 (aged 23)	(Algeria) Youth system
	(Algeria)		Lyes Boukria	9 September 1981 (aged 27)	(Algeria) NA Hussein Dey
Midfielders
	(Algeria)	DM	Lamara Douicher	10 March 1980 (aged 28)	(Algeria) Youth system
	(Algeria)	DM	Nassim Dehouche	12 August 1982 (aged 26)	(Algeria) JSM Bejaïa
	(Algeria)		Tayeb Maroci	1 June 1985 (aged 23)	(Algeria) USM Blida
	(Algeria)	CM	Chérif Abdeslam	1 September 1978 (aged 30)	(Algeria) NA Hussein Dey
	(Algeria)	CM	Nabil Hamouda	4 January 1983 (aged 25)	(Algeria) Paradou AC
	(Algeria)	AM	Tayeb Berramla	6 January 1985 (aged 23)	(Algeria) ASM Oran
	(Algeria)	AM	Yacine Amaouche	26 June 1979 (aged 29)	(Algeria) CA Batna
Forwards
	(Algeria)		Adlène Bensaïd	3 November 1981 (aged 27)	(Algeria) USM Blida
	(Algeria)		Mohamed Derrag	3 April 1985 (aged 23)	(Algeria) OMR El Annasser
	(Nigeria)	FW	Izu Azuka	24 May 1989 (aged 19)	(Nigeria) Sharks

== Competitions ==
=== Overview ===
Competition	Record								Started round	Final position / round	First match	Last match
Competition	G	W	D	L	GF	GA	GD	Win %	Started round	Final position / round	First match	Last match
National 1	32	15	14	3	38	19	+19	46.88	—N/a	Runners–up	8 August 2008	28 May 2009
Algerian Cup	1	0	1	0	0	0	+0	0.00	Round of 64		15 January 2009	
Confederation Cup	6	3	0	3	8	9	−1	50.00	Group stage		16 August 2008	18 October 2008
Champions League	2	0	0	2	1	3	−2	0.00	First round		15 March 2009	4 April 2009
Total	41	18	15	8	45	31	+14	43.90				

Updated to match played 3 June 2019
Source: Competitions

=== National 1 ===
==== League table ====
Pos	Team	Pld	W	D	L	GF	GA	GD	Pts	Qualification or relegation
1	ES Sétif (C, Q)	32	18	8	6	52	25	+27	62	2010 CAF Champions League
2	JS Kabylie (Q)	32	15	14	3	38	19	+19	59	2010 CAF Champions League
3	JSM Béjaïa	32	15	8	9	33	20	+13	53	
4	CR Belouizdad (Q)	32	15	5	12	33	27	+6	50	2010 CAF Confederation Cup
5	MC Alger	32	13	10	9	40	38	+2	49	

Source: DZFoot 1er Division 2008-2009
Rules for classification: 1) points; 2) goal difference; 3) number of goals scored.
(C) Champions; (Q) Qualified for the phase indicated

==== Results summary ====
Overall								Home						Away					
Pld	W	D	L	GF	GA	GD	Pts	W	D	L	GF	GA	GD	W	D	L	GF	GA	GD
32	15	14	3	38	19	+19	59	9	7	0	18	7	+11	6	7	3	20	12	+8

Last updated: 22 April 2018.
Source: Competitive matches

==== Results by round ====
Round	1	2	3	4	5	6	7	8	9	10	11	12	13	14	15	16	17	18	19	20	21	22	23	24	25	26	27	28	29	30	31	32
Ground																																
Result	D	D	D	L	D	L	D	D	W	W	W	D	L	W	D	W	W	D	D	W	W	W	D	W	D	W	W	D	D	W	W	W
Position	10	11	13	15	13	16	16	15	13	10	7	11	14	11	11	6	5	6	6	4	4	3	4	3	4	3	3	3	3	2	2	2

Source: Competitive matches
A = Away; H = Home; W = Win; D = Draw; L = Loss

=== Matches ===
Win Draw Loss

7 August 2020 Round 1	JS Kabylie	1–1	NA Hussein Dey	Tizi Ouzou
20:00	Berramla 40'		Galoul 36'	Stadium: Stade 1er Novembre 1954; Referee: Djamel Haimoudi

11 August 2008 Round 2	USM Alger	0–0	JS Kabylie	Bologhine
				Stadium: Omar Hamadi Stadium; Referee: Mohamed Khelifi

25 August 2020 Round 3	JS Kabylie	0–0	AS Khroub	Tizi Ouzou
20:00				Stadium: Stade 1er Novembre 1954; Referee: Mustapha Boumediene Mansouri

27 October 2020 Round 4	CR Belouizdad	1–0	JS Kabylie	Belouizdad
14:30	Berradja 51'			Stadium: Stade 20 Août 1955; Referee: Mohamed Fettouha

21 November 2020 Round 5	JS Kabylie	1–1	USM Annaba	Tizi Ouzou
14:30	Derrag 90'		Aoudia 69'	Stadium: Stade 1er Novembre 1954; Attendance: 0 (close doors); Referee: Mohamed Benouza

1 December 2020 Round 6	CA Bordj Bou Arréridj	3–2	JS Kabylie	Bordj Bou Arréridj
14:30	Hachoud 43'; Linares 53'; Bentayeb 70'		Boudjelid 19'; Derrag 87'	Stadium: August 20, 1955 Stadium; Referee: Farouk Houasnia

26 September 2020 Round 7	JS Kabylie	0–0	JSM Béjaïa	Tizi Ouzou
23:30				Stadium: Stade 1er Novembre 1954; Referee: Djamel Haimoudi

2 January 2009 Round 8	MSP Batna	1–1	JS Kabylie	Batna
15:00	Sidibé 60'		Achiou 81'	Stadium: Stade 1er Novembre 1954; Referee: Mohamed Amine Benaissa

19 January 2009 Round 9	JS Kabylie	2–1	ES Sétif	Tizi Ouzou
14:30	Bensaïd 62'; Achiou 73'		Hemani 85'	Stadium: Stade 1er Novembre 1954; Referee: Djamel Haimoudi

1 November 2008 Round 10	JS Kabylie	1–0	MC Saïda	Tizi Ouzou
14:30	Berramla 52'			Stadium: Stade 1er Novembre 1954; Referee: Abdelhamid Aouiti

10 November 2008 Round 11	USM Blida	0–2	JS Kabylie	Blida
14:30			Ouznadji 50'; Boudjelid 55'	Stadium: Stade Mustapha Tchaker; Referee: Mohamed Amine Benaissa

14 November 2008 Round 12	JS Kabylie	1–1	USM El Harrach	Tizi Ouzou
15:00	Berramla 27'		Guessoum 75'	Stadium: Stade 1er Novembre 1954; Referee: Belkacem Boumaza

27 November 2020 Round 13	MC Alger	2–1	JS Kabylie	Algiers
14:30	Amroune 67'; Boumechra 71'		Ouznadji 43'	Stadium: Stade du 5 Juillet; Referee: Abdelkader Abed

5 December 2008 Round 14	JS Kabylie	1–0	ASO Chlef	Tizi Ouzou
14:30	Meftah 10'			Stadium: Stade 1er Novembre 1954; Referee: Redouane Mehidi

29 January 2009 Round 15	MC El Eulma	0–0	JS Kabylie	El Eulma
14:30				Stadium: Stade Messaoud Zougar; Referee: Abdelkader Abed

6 February 2009 Round 16	JS Kabylie	1–0	RC Kouba	Tizi Ouzou
14:30	Bensaïd 20'			Stadium: Stade 1er Novembre 1954; Attendance: 0 (close doors); Referee: Mohamed Khelifi

15 February 2009 Round 17	NA Hussein Dey	0–1	JS Kabylie	Belouizdad
14:30			Berramla 52'	Stadium: Stade 20 Août 1955; Referee: Abdelkader Abed

19 February 2009 Round 18	JS Kabylie	0–0	USM Alger	Tizi Ouzou
				Stadium: Stade 1er Novembre; Referee: Mohamed Benouza

26 February 2009 Round 19	AS Khroub	1–1	JS Kabylie	El Khroub
14:30	Manga 90'		Bensaïd 53'	Stadium: Abed Hamdani Stadium; Referee: Belkacem Boumaza

2 March 2009 Round 20	JS Kabylie	2–1	CR Belouizdad	Tizi Ouzou
14:30	Coulibaly 39'; Meftah 69'		Harizi 80'	Stadium: Stade 1er Novembre 1954; Referee: Farouk Houasnia

5 March 2009 Round 21	USM Annaba	0–1	JS Kabylie	Annaba
14:30			Bensaïd 2'	Stadium: Stade 19 Mai 1956; Referee: Mustapha Ferradi

12 March 2009 Round 22	JS Kabylie	2–0	CA Bordj Bou Arréridj	Tizi Ouzou
14:30	Achiou 68'; Boussefiane 86'			Stadium: Stade 1er Novembre 1954; Referee: Mohamed Haddada

19 March 2009 Round 23	JSM Béjaïa	0–0	JS Kabylie	Béjaïa
14:30				Stadium: Stade de l'Unité Maghrébine; Referee: Farouk Houasnia

20 April 2009 Round 24	JS Kabylie	1–0	MSP Batna	Tizi Ouzou
19:00	Bensaïd 61'			Stadium: Stade 1er Novembre 1954; Referee: Mohamed Bichari

22 May 2009 Round 25	ES Sétif	1–1	JS Kabylie	Sétif
20:00	Hemani 61'		Meftah 68'	Stadium: Stade 8 Mai 1945; Referee: Mohamed Bichari

13 April 2009 Round 26	MC Saïda	2–4	JS Kabylie	Saïda
15:30	Seddik 29'; Ould Teguedi 90'		Hamouda 23'; Meftah 51'; Derrag 53'; Bensaïd 71'	Stadium: Stade 13 Avril 1958; Referee: Okba Benbaka

16 April 2009 Round 27	JS Kabylie	3–1	USM Blida	Tizi Ouzou
15:30	Meftah 4'; Derrag 71'; Bensaïd 90'		Zemouchi 15'	Stadium: Stade 1er Novembre 1954; Referee: Mohamed Bouhenni

30 April 2009 Round 28	USM El Harrach	1–1	JS Kabylie	El Harrach
15:30	Mebarakou 81'		Bensaïd 61'	Stadium: November 1, 1954 Stadium; Referee: Mohamed Haddada

7 May 2009 Round 29	JS Kabylie	1–1	MC Alger	Tizi Ouzou
19:00	Bensaïd 36'		Amroune 69'	Stadium: Stade 1er Novembre 1954; Referee: Farouk Houasnia

14 May 2009 Round 30	ASO Chlef	0–3	JS Kabylie	Chlef
20:00	Zaoui 70'		Meftah 46'	Stadium: Stade Mohamed Boumezrag; Referee: Djamel Haimoudi

25 May 2009 Round 31	JS Kabylie	1–0	MC El Eulma	Tizi Ouzou
19:00	Azuka 63'			Stadium: Stade 1er Novembre 1954; Referee: Mokhtar Amalou

28 May 2009 Round 32	RC Kouba	0–2	JS Kabylie	Kouba
17:00			Azuka 51', 64'	Stadium: Stade Omar Benhaddad; Referee: Farouk Mial

== Algerian Cup ==
15 January 2009 Round of 64	JS Kabylie	0–0 (a.e.t.) (1–4 p)	ASO Chlef	Koléa
14:00
Note: Lineup for JS Kabylie - .

== CAF Confederation Cup ==
=== Group stage ===
==== Group B ====
Pos	Team	Pld	W	D	L	GF	GA	GD	Pts	Qualification	ESS	ALM	JSK	ASK
1	(Tunisia) Etoile Sahel	6	3	1	2	8	6	+2	10	Final	—	2–1	2–0	2–0
2	(Sudan) Al-Merrikh	6	3	0	3	9	8	+1	9		2–0	—	3–1	2–1
3	(Algeria) JS Kabylie	6	3	0	3	8	9	−1	9		1–0	3–1	—	2–0
4	(Ghana) Asante Kotoko	6	2	1	3	7	9	−2	7		2–2	1–0	3–1	—

Source: CAF

16 August 2008 1	Al-Merrikh (Sudan)	3–1	(Algeria) JS Kabylie	Omdurman
16:00	Ahmed Mohamed 1', 12'; Abdul-Zahra 51'		Attiya 40' (o.g.)	Stadium: Al Merreikh Stadium; Referee: Victor Mwandike (Tanzania)

29 August 2008 2	JS Kabylie (Algeria)	1–0	(Tunisia) Etoile Sahel	Tizi Ouzou
19:30	Oussalah 57'			Stadium: Stade 1er Novembre 1954; Referee: Younis Yasser (Egypt)

13 September 2008 3	Asante Kotoko (Ghana)	3–1	(Algeria) JS Kabylie	Kumasi
15:00	Bekoe 39', 72'; Opoku 57'		Maroci 90+1'	Stadium: Baba Yara Stadium; Referee: Bakary Gassama (Gambia)

21 September 2008 4	JS Kabylie (Algeria)	2–0	(Ghana) Asante Kotoko	Tizi Ouzou
20:30	Bensaid 7' (pen.); Berramla 84'			Stadium: Stade 1er Novembre 1954; Referee: Aboubacar Sharaf (Ivory Coast)

5 October 2008 5	JS Kabylie (Algeria)	3–1	(Sudan) Al-Merrikh	Tizi Ouzou
20:00	Barry 61', 72'; Ouznadji 63'		Abdul-Zahra 85'	Stadium: Stade 1er Novembre 1954; Referee: Atsoo Kokou (Togo)

18 October 2008 6	Etoile Sahel (Tunisia)	2–0	(Algeria) JS Kabylie	Sousse
17:10	Al Jamal 11'; Nafkha 90' (pen.)			Stadium: Stade Olympique de Sousse; Referee: Ambaya Jamal (Libya)

== CAF Champions League ==
=== First round ===
15 March 2009 First leg	JS Kabylie (Algeria)	1–2	(Libya) Al Ahly Tripoli	Tizi Ouzou
16:00 UTC+1	Coulibaly 79' (pen.)		Ahmed Saad 55'; Fazzani 74'	Stadium: Stade 1er Novembre 1954; Referee: Osman Samir (Egypt)

4 April 2009 Second leg	Al Ahly Tripoli (Libya)	1–0	(Algeria) JS Kabylie	Tripoli
19:00 UTC+2	Daoud 39'			Stadium: 11 June Stadium; Referee: Aouaz Trabelsi (Tunisia)

== Squad information ==
=== Playing statistics ===
No.	Pos	Nat	Player	Total		National 1		Algerian Cup		Confederation Cup		Champions League	
No.	Pos	Nat	Player	Apps	Goals	Apps	Goals	Apps	Goals	Apps	Goals	Apps	Goals
13	GK	(Algeria) ALG	Mourad Berrefane	3	0	3	0	0	0	0	0	0	0
26	GK	(Algeria) ALG	Faouzi Chaouchi	36	0	28	0	0	0	6	0	2	0
12	GK	(Algeria) ALG	Nabil Mazari	1	0	1	0	0	0	0	0	0	0
20	DF	(Mali) MLI	Demba Barry	14	2	10	0	0	0	4	2	0	0
31	DF	(Mali) MLI	Idrissa Coulibaly	37	2	30	1	0	0	5	0	2	1
28	DF	(Algeria) ALG	Essaïd Belkalem	19	0	17	0	0	0	0	0	2	0
21	DF	(Algeria) ALG	Koceila Berchiche	9	0	9	0	0	0	0	0	0	0
5	DF	(Algeria) ALG	Farid Bellabes	21	0	18	0	0	0	2	0	1	0
30	DF	(Algeria) ALG	Mohamed Rabie Meftah	32	6	27	6	0	0	5	0	0	0
24	DF	(Algeria) ALG	Nassim Oussalah	34	1	27	0	0	0	5	1	2	0
3	DF	(Algeria) ALG	Lyes Boukria	16	0	10	0	0	0	6	0	0	0
18	MF	(Algeria) ALG	Lamara Douicher	33	0	26	0	0	0	6	0	1	0
17	MF	(Algeria) ALG	Nassim Dehouche	32	0	24	0	0	0	6	0	2	0
6	MF	(Algeria) ALG	Tayeb Maroci	19	1	13	0	0	0	6	1	0	0
15	MF	(Algeria) ALG	Ayache Belaoued	6	0	4	0	0	0	0	0	2	0
8	MF	(Algeria) ALG	Chérif Abdeslam	32	0	24	0	0	0	6	0	2	0
22	MF	(Algeria) ALG	Nabil Hamouda	13	1	12	1	0	0	1	0	0	0
14	MF	(Algeria) ALG	Mohamed Nabil Bellat	2	0	2	0	0	0	0	0	0	0
10	MF	(Algeria) ALG	Tayeb Berramla	33	5	27	4	0	0	4	1	2	0
11	MF	(Algeria) ALG	Yacine Amaouche	19	0	12	0	0	0	5	0	2	0
23	MF	(Algeria) ALG	Hocine Achiou	20	3	18	3	0	0	0	0	2	0
36	FW	(Algeria) ALG	Mohamed Boussefiane	8	1	8	1	0	0	0	0	0	0
7	FW	(Algeria) ALG	Adlène Bensaïd	33	10	26	9	0	0	5	1	2	0
16	FW	(Algeria) ALG	Mohamed Derrag	27	4	23	4	0	0	2	0	2	0
35	FW	(Nigeria) NGA	Izu Azuka	17	3	15	3	0	0	0	0	2	0
Players transferred out during the season
	DF	(Algeria) ALG	Mohamed Aït Kaci	2	0	1	0	0	0	1	0	0	0
	FW	(Benin) BEN	Wassiou Oladipupo	4	0	3	0	0	0	1	0	0	0
	FW	(Algeria) ALG	Bachir Boudjelid	14	2	9	2	0	0	5	0	0	0
	FW	(Algeria) ALG	Nouri Ouznadji	15	3	12	2	0	0	3	1	0	0

Last updated: 13 November 2020

=== Goalscorers ===
Includes all competitive matches. The list is sorted alphabetically by surname when total goals are equal.

No.	Nat.	Player	Pos.	L 1	AC	CC 3	CL 1	TOTAL
7	(Algeria)	Adlène Bensaïd	FW	9	0	1	0	10
30	(Algeria)	Mohamed Rabie Meftah	DF	6	0	0	0	6
10	(Algeria)	Tayeb Berramla	MF	4	0	1	0	5
16	(Algeria)	Mohamed Derrag	FW	4	0	0	0	4
35	(Nigeria)	Izu Azuka	FW	3	0	0	0	3
23	(Algeria)	Hocine Achiou	MF	3	0	0	0	3
	(Algeria)	Nouri Ouznadji	FW	2	0	1	0	3
31	(Mali)	Idrissa Coulibaly	DF	1	0	0	1	2
	(Algeria)	Bachir Boudjelid	FW	2	0	0	0	2
20	(Mali)	Demba Barry	DF	0	0	2	0	2
22	(Algeria)	Nabil Hamouda	MF	1	0	0	0	1
24	(Algeria)	Nassim Oussalah	DF	0	0	1	0	1
6	(Algeria)	Tayeb Maroci	MF	0	0	1	0	1
Own Goals				0	0	1	0	1
Totals				38	0	8	1	45

== Transfers ==
=== In ===
Date	Pos	Player	From club	Transfer fee	Source
30 June 2008	FW	(Algeria) Nouri Ouznadji	NA Hussein Dey	Undisclosed	
1 July 2008	FW	(Algeria) Bachir Boudjelid	CA Bordj Bou Arréridj	Undisclosed	
1 July 2008	MF	(Algeria) Ayache Belaoued	USM Blida	Undisclosed	
1 July 2008	MF	(Algeria) Tayeb Maroci	USM Blida	Undisclosed	
1 July 2008	DF	(Algeria) Lyes Boukria	NA Hussein Dey	Undisclosed	
1 July 2008	DF	(Algeria) Farid Bellabes	MC Oran	Undisclosed	
1 July 2008	DF	(Algeria) Koceila Berchiche	WA Rouiba	Undisclosed	
7 July 2008	MF	(Algeria) Mohamed Nabil Bellat	USM El Harrach	Undisclosed	
20 December 2008	MF	(Algeria) Hocine Achiou	USM Alger	Undisclosed	

=== Out ===
Date	Pos	Player	To club	Transfer fee	Source
1 July 2008	MF	(Algeria) Nabil Hemani	ES Sétif	Undisclosed	
1 January 2009	DF	(Algeria) Mohamed Aït Kaci	ES Sétif	Undisclosed	
1 January 2009	FW	(Benin) Wassiou Oladipupo	(Benin) Soleil FC	Undisclosed	
13 January 2009	MF	(Algeria) Bachir Boudjelid	NA Hussein Dey	Undisclosed	
15 January 2009	FW	(Algeria) Nouri Ouznadji	USM Alger	Undisclosed	
