= 2008 CAF Confederation Cup group stage =

The group stage of the 2008 CAF Confederation Cup was played from 16 August to 19 October 2008. A total of eight teams competed in the group stage.

== Format ==
In the group stage, each group was played on a home-and-away round-robin basis. The winners of each group advanced directly to the final.

Key to colours in group tables
Group winners advance to the final

== Groups ==
=== Group A ===
Pos	Team	Pld	W	D	L	GF	GA	GD	Pts	Qualification	CSS	HEH	CA	INT
1	(Tunisia) CS Sfaxien	6	4	1	1	11	6	+5	13	Final	—	1–0	2–0	4–1
2	(Egypt) Haras El Hodood	6	3	1	2	10	6	+4	10		3–1	—	2–1	4–1
3	(Tunisia) Club Africain	6	2	2	2	7	6	+1	8		0–0	1–1	—	3–0
4	(Angola) Interclube	6	1	0	5	6	16	−10	3		2–3	1–0	1–2	—

Source: CAF
Rules for classification: Group stage tiebreakers
16 August 2008
18:30 GMT

CS Sfaxien (Tunisia)	4 – 1	(Angola) Interclube
Nafti Abdekkrim 17'; Soumah Naby 41'; Agyemang Opoku 50'; Hamza Younes 65'		Bumba 86'

Stade Taïeb Mhiri, Sfax
Referee: Diouf Abdou Samba (Senegal)
17 August 2008
14:00 GMT

Haras El Hodood (Egypt)	2 – 1	(Tunisia) Club Africain
Mohamed Fawzy 67'; Ahmed Abdel-Ghani 80'		Zouheir Dhaouadi 7'

Alexandria Stadium, Alexandria

30 August 2008
18:10 UTC

Club Africain (Tunisia)	0 – 0	(Tunisia) CS Sfaxien

Stade Olympique d'El Menzah, Tunis
Referee: El Achiri Abdellah (Morocco)
31 August 2008
18:00 UTC

Interclube (Angola)	1 – 0	(Egypt) Haras El Hodood
Abdel Traoré 80'

Estádio dos Coqueiros, Luanda
Referee: Kaoma Wellington (Zambia)

12 September 2008
19:30 UTC

Haras El Hodood (Egypt)	3 – 1	(Tunisia) CS Sfaxien
Ahmed Eid Abd El Malek 13'; Ahmed Abdel-Ghani 16'; Abdul Hamid Bassiouny 40'		Kouassi Blaise 19'

Alexandria Stadium, Alexandria
14 September 2008
20:00 UTC

Club Africain (Tunisia)	3 – 0	(Angola) Interclube
Junior Osagie 16'; Wissem Ben Yahia 21'; Oussama Sellami 81'

Stade Olympique d'El Menzah, Tunis

19 September 2008
20:00 UTC

CS Sfaxien (Tunisia)	1 – 0	(Egypt) Haras El Hodood
Issam Merdassi 25'		Kameni (GK) (red card) 89'

Stade Taïeb Mhiri, Sfax
Referee: Ould Lemghambodj (Mauritania)
21 September 2008
18:00 UTC

Interclube (Angola)	1 – 2	(Tunisia) Club Africain
Romi 90'		Wissem Ben Yahia 2'; Abdelmoneem Derbali 42'; Wissem Ben Yahia (red card) 89'

Estádio dos Coqueiros, Luanda
Referee: Fakudze Mbongseni (Eswatini)

5 October 2008
17:10 UTC

Club Africain (Tunisia)	1 – 1	(Egypt) Haras El Hodood
Sellami 32' (pen.)		Ahmed Abdel-Ghani 49'

Stade Olympique d'El Menzah, Tunis
Referee: Tamuni Wahid (Libya)
3 October 2008
20:00 UTC

Interclube (Angola)	2 – 3	(Tunisia) CS Sfaxien
Abdel Traoré 34'; Mingo 78'		Kouassi Blaise 12'; Karim Nafti 37'; 76'

Estádio dos Coqueiros, Luanda
Referee: AGBOVI William (Ghana)

19 October 2008
17:10 UTC

CS Sfaxien (Tunisia)	2 – 0	(Tunisia) Club Africain
Karim Nafti 34'; Karim Ben Amor 90'

Stade Taïeb Mhiri, Sfax
Referee: Keita Yakhouba (Guinea)
19 October 2008
17:10 UTC

Haras El Hodood (Egypt)	4 – 1	(Angola) Interclube
Mohamed Meky 1' 20'; Mohamed Fawzy 40'; Ahmed Abdel-Ghani 70'		Pedro Henriques 85'

Alexandria Stadium, Alexandria
Referee: Mwandike Victor (Tanzania)

=== Group B ===
Pos	Team	Pld	W	D	L	GF	GA	GD	Pts	Qualification	ESS	ALM	JSK	ASK
1	(Tunisia) Etoile Sahel	6	3	1	2	8	6	+2	10	Final	—	2–1	2–0	2–0
2	(Sudan) Al-Merrikh	6	3	0	3	9	8	+1	9		2–0	—	3–1	2–1
3	(Algeria) JS Kabylie	6	3	0	3	8	9	−1	9		1–0	3–1	—	2–0
4	(Ghana) Asante Kotoko	6	2	1	3	7	9	−2	7		2–2	1–0	3–1	—

Source: CAF
Rules for classification: Group stage tiebreakers
16 August 2008
16:00 GMT

Al-Merrikh (Sudan)	3 – 1	(Algeria) JS Kabylie
Mugahid Ahmed Mohamed 01'; Mugahid Ahmed Mohamed 12'; Alaa Abdul-Zahra 51'		Saad Attiya 40' (o.g.)

Al Merreikh Stadium, Omdurman
17 August 2008
17:10 GMT

Etoile Sahel (Tunisia)	2 – 0	(Ghana) Asante Kotoko
Emeka Opara 13'; Emeka Opara 70'

Stade Olympique de Sousse, Sousse

31 August 2008
14:30 UTC

Asante Kotoko (Ghana)	1 – 0	(Sudan) Al-Merrikh
Eric Bekoe 87'

Baba Yara(formerly Kumasi) Sports Stadium, Kumasi
Referee: Mdume Gil Sebastian (Gabon)
29 August 2008
19:30 UTC

JS Kabylie (Algeria)	1 – 0	(Tunisia) Etoile Sahel
Nassim Oussalah 57'

Stade 1er Novembre (Tizi Ouzou), Tizi Ouzou
Referee: Younis Yasser (Egypt)

13 September 2008
20:00 UTC

Etoile Sahel (Tunisia)	2 – 1	(Sudan) Al-Merrikh
Mehdi Meriah 50'; Emeka Opara 78'		Haytham Tambal 85'

Stade Olympique de Sousse, Sousse
13 September 2008
15:00 UTC

Asante Kotoko (Ghana)	3 – 1	(Algeria) JS Kabylie
Eric Bekoe 39'; Jordan Opoku 57'; Eric Bekoe 72'		Tayeb Berramla 91'

Baba Yara(formerly Kumasi) Sports Stadium, Kumasi

20 September 2008
19:00 UTC

Al-Merrikh (Sudan)	2 – 0	(Tunisia) Etoile Sahel
Idahor 39' (pen.) Idahor 76'

Al Merreikh Stadium, Omdurman
Referee: Kapanga Patrick (Malawi)
21 September 2008
20:30 UTC

JS Kabylie (Algeria)	2 – 0	(Ghana) Asante Kotoko
(pen.) Adlène Bensaid 07'; Tayeb Berramla 84'		Jordan Opoku (red card) 63'

Stade 1er Novembre (Tizi Ouzou), Tizi Ouzou
Referee: Aboubacar Sharaf (Ivory Coast)

4 October 2008
15:00 UTC

Asante Kotoko (Ghana)	2 – 2	(Tunisia) Etoile Sahel
Kwabena Yaro 08' (pen.) Eric Bekoe 79'		Slim Jedaied 64' (pen.) Mohamed Ali Nafkha 85'; Mohamed Sakho (red card) 86'

Baba Yara(formerly Kumasi) Sports Stadium, Kumasi
Referee: Eyene Lambert (Cameroon)
5 October 2008
20:00 UTC

JS Kabylie (Algeria)	3 – 1	(Sudan) Al-Merrikh
Demba Barry 61, 72'; Nouri Ouznadji 63'		Alaa Abdul-Zahra 85'

Stade 1er Novembre (Tizi Ouzou), Tizi Ouzou
Referee: Atsoo Kokou (Togo)

18 October 2008
17:10 UTC

Al-Merrikh (Sudan)	2 – 1	(Ghana) Asante Kotoko
Abdelhamid Ammari 10' 24'		Eric Bekoe 21'

Al Merreikh Stadium, Omdurman
Referee: Musungayi Mpunga (Democratic Republic of the Congo)
18 October 2008
17:10 UTC

Etoile Sahel (Tunisia)	2 – 0	(Algeria) JS Kabylie
Ammar Al Jamal 11'; Mohamed Ali Nafkha 90' (pen.)		Tayeb Maroci (red card); Mohamed Rabie Meftah (red card) 90+2'

Stade Olympique de Sousse, Sousse
Referee: Ambaya Jamal (Libya)
