= 2009–10 JS Kabylie season =

JS Kabylie
2009–10 season
- President: Mohand Chérif Hannachi
- Head Coach: Mourad Karouf (from November 2009) (until January 2010); Alain Geiger (from 14 January 2010)
- Stadium: Stade du 1^{er} Novembre 1954
- National 1: 3rd
- Algerian Cup: Semi-finals
- Champions League: Second round
- Top goalscorer: League: Sid Ali Yahia-Chérif (10); All: Sid Ali Yahia-Chérif (11)

The 2009–10 season was JS Kabylie's 40th season in the Algerian top flight, They competed in National 1, the Algerian Cup and the Champions League.

== Squad list ==
Players and squad numbers last updated on 18 November 2009.
Note: Flags indicate national team as has been defined under FIFA eligibility rules. Players may hold more than one non-FIFA nationality.

| No. | Nat. | Position | Name | Date of birth (age) | Signed from |
Goalkeepers
| | (Algeria) | GK | Nabil Mazari | 18 February 1984 (aged 25) | (Algeria) Youth system |
| | (Algeria) | GK | Mourad Berrefane | 18 March 1986 (aged 23) | (Algeria) Youth system |
Defenders
| | (Algeria) | LB | Chemseddine Nessakh | 4 January 1988 (aged 21) | (Algeria) ASM Oran |
| | (Algeria) | CB | Koceila Berchiche | 5 August 1985 (aged 24) | (Algeria) RC Kouba |
| | (Algeria) | LB | Nassim Oussalah | 8 October 1981 (aged 28) | (Algeria) MO Béjaïa |
| | (Mali) | CB | Idrissa Coulibaly | 19 December 1987 (aged 22) | (Mali) Centre Salif Keita |
| | (Algeria) | RB | Mohamed Khoutir Ziti | 19 April 1989 (aged 20) | (Algeria) ES Setif |
| | (Algeria) | CB | Essaïd Belkalem | 1 January 1989 (aged 21) | (Algeria) Youth system |
| | (Algeria) | | Farid Bellabès | 20 October 1985 (aged 24) | (Algeria) MC Oran |
| | (Algeria) | RB | Mohamed Rabie Meftah | 5 May 1985 (aged 24) | (Algeria) Youth system |
| | (Algeria) | | Lyes Boukria | 9 September 1981 (aged 28) | (Algeria) NA Hussein Dey |
Midfielders
| | (Algeria) | RM | Saad Tedjar | 14 January 1986 (aged 23) | (Algeria) Paradou AC |
| | (Algeria) | MF | Abdennour Chérif El-Ouazzani | 18 March 1986 (aged 23) | (Algeria) MC Oran |
| | (Algeria) | DM | Lamara Douicher | 10 March 1980 (aged 29) | (Algeria) Youth system |
| | (Algeria) | DM | Lyès Saïdi | 24 August 1987 (aged 22) | (Algeria) ORB Akbou |
| | (Algeria) | DM | Mokhtar Lamhene | 18 January 1990 (aged 19) | (Algeria) Youth system |
| | (Algeria) | | Tayeb Maroci | 1 June 1985 (aged 24) | (Algeria) USM Blida |
| | (Algeria) | | Idriss Ech-Chergui | 22 May 1985 (aged 24) | (Algeria) Nîmes Olympique |
Forwards
| | (Algeria) | RW | Sid Ali Yahia-Chérif | 4 January 1985 (aged 24) | (Algeria) RC Kouba |
| | (Algeria) | FW | Farès Hamiti | 26 June 1987 (aged 22) | (Algeria) USM Blida |
| | (Algeria) | FW | Mohamed Amine Aoudia | 6 June 1987 (aged 22) | (Algeria) USM Annaba |
| | (Nigeria) | FW | Izu Azuka | 24 May 1989 (aged 20) | (Nigeria) Sharks |
| | (Algeria) | | Yassine Akkouche | 28 July 1984 (aged 25) | (Algeria) ORB Akbou |
| | (Algeria) | | Mohamed Seguer | 7 September 1985 (aged 24) | (Algeria) ES Setif |
| | (Algeria) | | Mohamed Abdelaziz Tchikou | 14 December 1985 (aged 24) | (Algeria) NARB Réghaïa |
| | (Algeria) | | Karim Braham Chaouch | 17 July 1978 (aged 31) | (Algeria) MSP Batna |

== Competitions ==
=== Overview ===
| Competition | Record | | | | | | | | Started round | Final position / round | First match | Last match |
| Competition | G | W | D | L | GF | GA | GD | Win % | Started round | Final position / round | First match | Last match |
|---|---|---|---|---|---|---|---|---|---|---|---|---|
| National 1 | 34 | 15 | 9 | 10 | 39 | 27 | +12 | 44.12 | —N/a | 3rd | 25 September 2010 | 8 July 2011 |
| Algerian Cup | 5 | 4 | 1 | 0 | 8 | 1 | +7 | 80.00 | Round of 64 | Semi-finals | 25 December 2009 | 20 April 2010 |
| Champions League | 6 | 4 | 1 | 1 | 10 | 4 | +6 | 66.67 | Preliminary round | Second round | 13 February 2010 | 9 May 2010 |
| Total | 45 | 23 | 11 | 11 | 57 | 32 | +25 | 51.11 | | | | |

Updated to match played 3 June 2019
Source: Competitions

=== National 1 ===
==== League table ====
| Pos | Team | Pld | W | D | L | GF | GA | GD | Pts | Qualification or relegation |
|---|---|---|---|---|---|---|---|---|---|---|
| 1 | MC Alger (C, Q) | 34 | 18 | 12 | 4 | 50 | 23 | +27 | 66 | 2011 CAF Champions League |
| 2 | ES Sétif (Q) | 34 | 17 | 12 | 5 | 51 | 32 | +19 | 63 | 2011 CAF Champions League |
| 3 | JS Kabylie (Q) | 34 | 15 | 9 | 10 | 39 | 27 | +12 | 54 | 2011 CAF Confederation Cup |
| 4 | USM Alger | 34 | 14 | 11 | 9 | 47 | 33 | +14 | 53 | |
| 5 | USM El Harrach | 34 | 13 | 13 | 8 | 46 | 33 | +13 | 52 | |

Source: Soccerways FIFA.com
Rules for classification: 1) points; 2) goal difference; 3) number of goals scored.
(C) Champions; (Q) Qualified for the phase indicated

==== Results summary ====
| Overall | | | | | | | | Home | | | | | | Away | | | | | |
| Pld | W | D | L | GF | GA | GD | Pts | W | D | L | GF | GA | GD | W | D | L | GF | GA | GD |
|---|---|---|---|---|---|---|---|---|---|---|---|---|---|---|---|---|---|---|---|
| 34 | 15 | 9 | 10 | 40 | 28 | +12 | 54 | 12 | 5 | 0 | 32 | 10 | +22 | 3 | 4 | 10 | 8 | 18 | −10 |

Last updated: 22 April 2018.
Source: Competitive matches

==== Results by round ====
| Round | 1 | 2 | 3 | 4 | 5 | 6 | 7 | 8 | 9 | 10 | 11 | 12 | 13 | 14 | 15 | 16 | 17 | 18 | 19 | 20 | 21 | 22 | 23 | 24 | 25 | 26 | 27 | 28 | 29 | 30 | 31 | 32 | 33 | 34 |
|---|---|---|---|---|---|---|---|---|---|---|---|---|---|---|---|---|---|---|---|---|---|---|---|---|---|---|---|---|---|---|---|---|---|---|
| Ground | A | H | A | H | A | H | A | H | A | H | A | H | A | H | A | H | H | H | A | H | A | H | A | H | A | H | A | H | A | H | A | H | A | A |
| Result | L | W | D | D | L | W | L | W | L | W | L | W | D | W | D | W | W | W | L | W | W | D | D | D | L | D | L | W | L | D | L | W | W | W |
| Position | 18 | 8 | | | | | | | | | | | | | | | | | | | | | | | | | | | | | | | | 3 |

Source: Competitive matches
A = Away; H = Home; W = Win; D = Draw; L = Loss

=== Matches ===
Win Draw Loss

| 6 August 2009 Round 1 | CA Bordj Bou Arreridj | 1–0 | JS Kabylie | Bordj Bou Arréridj |
| 19:00 | Touati 89' | Soccerway report | | Stadium: August 20, 1955 Stadium; Referee: Redouane Necib |

| 15 August 2009 Round 2 | JS Kabylie | 1–0 | USM El Harrach | Tizi Ouzou |
| 19:00 | Yahia-Chérif 19' | Soccerway report | | Stadium: Stade 1er Novembre 1954 |

| 22 August 2009 Round 3 | NA Hussein Dey | 1–1 | JS Kabylie | Algiers |
| 16:30 | Boussefiane 85' | Soccerway report | Tedjar 4' | Stadium: Stade Frères Zioui; Referee: Mohamed Benouza |

| 28 August 2009 Round 4 | JS Kabylie | 0–0 | MC Oran | Tizi Ouzou |
| 23:00 | | Soccerway report | | Stadium: Stade 1er Novembre 1954; Referee: Mohamed Bichari |

| 11 September 2009 Round 5 | MC Alger | 1–0 | JS Kabylie | Algiers |
| 23:00 | Bouguèche 71' | Soccerway report | | Stadium: Stade 5 Juillet 1962; Attendance: 0 (close doors); Referee: Mokhtar Amalou |

| 18 September 2009 Round 6 | JS Kabylie | 3–1 | WA Tlemcen | Tizi Ouzou |
| 23:00 | Hamiti 32', 75', 84' | Soccerway report | Benmoussa 35' (pen.) | Stadium: Stade 1er Novembre 1954; Referee: Ramzi Habibatni |

| 25 September 2009 Round 7 | JSM Béjaïa | 1–0 | JS Kabylie | Béjaïa |
| 16:00 | Belkheir 41' | Soccerway report | | Stadium: Stade de l'Unité Maghrébine; Referee: Mohamed Bouhenni |

| 2 October 2009 Round 8 | JS Kabylie | 3–0 | AS Khroub | Tizi Ouzou |
| 16:00 | Akkouche 21', 61'; Tedjar 25' | Soccerway report | | Stadium: Stade 1er Novembre 1954; Referee: Redouane Necib |

| 8 December 2009 Round 9 | ES Sétif | 2–0 | JS Kabylie | Sétif |
| 18:00 | Ziaya 22', 69' | Soccerway report | | Stadium: Stade 8 Mai 1945; Referee: Mohamed Benouza |

| 24 October 2009 Round 10 | JS Kabylie | 1–0 | MC El Eulma | Tizi Ouzou |
| 16:00 | Akkouche 16' | Soccerway report | | Stadium: Stade 1er Novembre 1954; Referee: Said Benamara |

| 30 October 2009 Round 11 | CR Belouizdad | 1–0 | JS Kabylie | Belouizdad |
| 18:00 | Saïbi 11' | Soccerway report | | Stadium: Stade 20 Août 1955; Referee: Mohamed Bichari |

| 7 November 2009 Round 12 | JS Kabylie | 2–1 | MSP Batna | Tizi Ouzou |
| 14:30 | Hamiti 31', 88' | Soccerway report | Ziad 90+2' | Stadium: Stade 1er Novembre 1954; Referee: Mohamed Hediaf |

| 24 November 2009 Round 13 | USM Alger | 1–1 | JS Kabylie | Bologhine |
| 14:30 | Hamidi 16' | Soccerway report | Aoudia 87' | Stadium: Omar Hamadi Stadium; Referee: Rafik Achouri |

| 1 December 2009 Round 14 | JS Kabylie | 4–0 | USM Annaba | Tizi Ouzou |
| 14:00 | Yahia-Chérif 40'; Belkalem 48'; Aoudia 61'; Bellabes 90+2' | Soccerway report | | Stadium: Stade 1er Novembre 1954; Referee: Djamel Haimoudi |

| 5 December 2009 Round 15 | USM Blida | 1–1 | JS Kabylie | Blida |
| 14:30 | Djemaouni 21' | Soccerway report | Yahia-Chérif 23' | Stadium: Stade Mustapha Tchaker; Attendance: 0 (close doors); Referee: Mohamed Haddada |

| 12 December 2009 Round 16 | JS Kabylie | 1–0 | ASO Chlef | Tizi Ouzou |
| 14:30 | Azuka 90+2' | Soccerway report | | Stadium: Stade 1er Novembre 1954; Attendance: 0 (close doors); Referee: Boubekeur Zouaoui |

| 15 December 2009 Round 17 | JS Kabylie | 3–1 | CA Batna | Tizi Ouzou |
| 14:00 | Ziti 18'; Aoudia 52'; Yahia-Chérif 61' | Soccerway report | Bourahli 26' | Stadium: Stade 1er Novembre 1954; Attendance: 0 (close doors); Referee: Said Benamara |

| 16 January 2010 Round 18 | JS Kabylie | 2–0 | CA Bordj Bou Arreridj | Tizi Ouzou |
| 14:30 | Azuka 18'; Yahia-Chérif 45' | Soccerway report | | Stadium: Stade 1er Novembre 1954; Attendance: 0 (close doors); Referee: Mohamed Haddada |

| 23 January 2010 Round 19 | USM El Harrach | 2–1 | JS Kabylie | El Harrach |
| 14:30 | Bey 7'; Hanitser 51' | Soccerway report | Meftah 73' (pen.) | Stadium: Stade 1er Novembre 1954; Referee: Rafik Achouri |

| 30 January 2010 Round 20 | JS Kabylie | 2–0 | NA Hussein Dey | Tizi Ouzou |
| 14:30 | Tedjar 14'; Meftah 21' (pen.) | Soccerway report | | Stadium: Stade 1er Novembre 1954; Referee: Redouane Necib |

| 6 February 2010 Round 21 | MC Oran | 0–1 | JS Kabylie | Oran |
| 14:30 | | Soccerway report | Hamiti 24' | Stadium: Stade Ahmed Zabana; Referee: Mehdi Abid Charef |

| 23 February 2010 Round 22 | JS Kabylie | 0–0 | MC Alger | Tizi Ouzou |
| 14:00 | | Soccerway report | | Stadium: Stade 1er Novembre 1954; Attendance: 21,240; Referee: Djamel Haimoudi |

| 26 March 2010 Round 23 | WA Tlemcen | 1–1 | JS Kabylie | Tlemcen |
| 14:30 | Benmoussa 10' (pen.) | Soccerway report | Aoudia 50' | Stadium: Stade Akid Lotfi |

| 6 March 2010 Round 24 | JS Kabylie | 1–1 | JSM Béjaïa | Tizi Ouzou |
| 14:30 | Yahia-Chérif 37' | Soccerway report | Zerdab 15' | Stadium: Stade 1er Novembre 1954; Referee: Mohamed Bichari |

| 16 April 2010 Round 25 | AS Khroub | 1–0 | JS Kabylie | El Khroub |
| 16:00 | Nait Yahia 37' (pen.) | Soccerway report | | Stadium: Abed Hamdani Stadium; Referee: Mehdi Abid Charef |

| 16 May 2010 Round 26 | JS Kabylie | 1–1 | ES Sétif | Tizi Ouzou |
| 17:00 | Seguer 88' | Soccerway report | Metref 24' | Stadium: Stade 1er Novembre 1954; Referee: Sofiane Bousseter |

| 6 April 2010 Round 27 | MC El Eulma | 1–0 | JS Kabylie | El Eulma |
| 15:00 | Belhamel 23' | Soccerway report | | Stadium: Stade Messaoud Zougar; Referee: Mohamed Bouhenni |

| 30 April 2010 Round 28 | JS Kabylie | 2–1 | CR Belouizdad | Tizi Ouzou |
| 17:00 | Coulibaly 20'; Yahia-Chérif 47' | Soccerway report | Younes 44' (pen.) | Stadium: Stade 1er Novembre 1954; Referee: Boubekeur Zouaoui |

| 19 May 2010 Round 29 | MSP Batna | 1–0 | JS Kabylie | Batna |
| 17:00 | Hezil 42' | Soccerway report | | Stadium: Stade 1er Novembre 1954; Referee: Abdelkader Karabi |

| 13 May 2010 Round 30 | JS Kabylie | 2–2 | USM Alger | Tizi Ouzou |
| 17:00 | Coulibaly 42'; Yahia Cherif 55' | Soccerway report | Ouznadji 72', 76' | Stadium: Stade 1er Novembre 1954; Referee: Redouane Necib |

| 22 May 2010 Round 31 | USM Annaba | 3–0 | JS Kabylie | Annaba |
| 17:00 | Boudar 11', 43'; Bensaïd 90+2' | Soccerway report | | Stadium: Stade 19 Mai 1956; Referee: Mehdi Abid Charef |

| 25 May 2010 Round 32 | JS Kabylie | 3–1 | USM Blida | Tizi Ouzou |
| 17:00 | Ech-Chergui 21'; Yahia Chérif 52'; Azuka 73' | Soccerway report | Tilbi 12' | Stadium: Stade 1er Novembre 1954; Attendance: 0 (close doors); Referee: Said Douala |

| 28 May 2010 Round 33 | ASO Chlef | 0–1 | JS Kabylie | Chlef |
| 17:00 | | Soccerway report | Maroci 49' | Stadium: Stade Mohamed Boumezrag; Attendance: 0 (close doors); Referee: Mohamed Babou |

| 31 May 2010 Round 34 | CA Batna | 0–1 | JS Kabylie | Batna |
| 17:00 | | Soccerway report | Yahia-Chérif 56' | Stadium: Mustapha Seffouhi Stadium; Referee: Mehdi Abid Charef |

== Algerian Cup ==
| 25 December 2009 Round of 64 | USMM Hadjout | 1–2 | JS Kabylie | Hadjout |
| 14:30 | Mohamed Badni 62' | | Bellabes 8'; Tedjar 9' | Stadium: Stade 05 juillet 1962 |

| 19 February 2010 Round of 32 | JS Kabylie | 4–0 | ASA Protection Civile | Tizi Ouzou |
| 14:30 | Nessakh 34'; Azuka 56', 63', 84' | | | Stadium: Stade 1er Novembre 1954; Referee: Sekhraoui, Bounoua, Bourouba |

| 15 March 2010 Round of 16 | CR Belouizdad | 0–1 | JS Kabylie | Algiers |
| 14:00 | | | Aoudia 30' | Stadium: Stade 20 Août 1955; Referee: Mokhtar Amalou |

| 9 April 2010 Quarter-finals | USM Annaba | 0–1 | JS Kabylie | Annaba |
| 14:30 | | | Aoudia 47' | Stadium: Stade 19 Mai 1956; Referee: Mohamed Benouza |

| 20 April 2010 Semi-finals | CA Batna | 0–0 (a.e.t.) (7–6 p) | JS Kabylie | Batna |
| 17:00 | | | | Stadium: Stade 1er Novembre 1954; Referee: Boumaaza |
| | Penalties |
| | Penalty missed Penalty scored | | (penalty scored) Meftah; (penalty missed) Yahia-Chérif; (penalty scored) Tedjar; (penalty scored) Maroci; (penalty scored) Aoudia; (penalty scored) Hamiti; (penalty scored) Coulibaly; (penalty missed) El Ouazzani |

== Champions League ==
=== Preliminary round ===
| 13 February 2010 First leg | Armed Forces (The Gambia) | 1–2 | (Algeria) JS Kabylie | Bakau |
| 14:00 UTC±0 | Hadjaoui 85' (o.g.) | Report | Hamiti 48'; Aoudia 56' | Stadium: Independence Stadium; Referee: Abdellah El Achiri (Morocco) |

| 27 February 2010 Second leg | JS Kabylie (Algeria) | 3–0 | (The Gambia) Armed Forces | Tizi Ouzou |
| 15:00 UTC+1 | Oussalah 24'; Meftah 53' (pen.); Seguer 83' | Report | | Stadium: Stade 1er Novembre 1954; Referee: Ousmane Sidibe (Mali) |

=== First round ===
| 19 March 2010 First leg | Club Africain (Tunisia) | 1–1 | (Algeria) JS Kabylie | Tunis |
| 17:00 UTC+1 | Traore 85' | Report | Ech-Chergui 30' | Stadium: Stade El Menzah; Referee: Khalid Ennouni (Morocco) |

| 2 April 2010 Second leg | JS Kabylie (Algeria) | 1–0 | (Tunisia) Club Africain | Tizi Ouzou |
| 16:00 UTC+1 | Yahia-Chérif 36' | Report | | Stadium: Stade 1er Novembre; Referee: Adel El Raay (Libya) |

=== Second round ===
| 25 April 2010 First leg | JS Kabylie (Algeria) | 2–0 | (Angola) Atlético Petróleos Luanda | Tizi Ouzou |
| 17:00 UTC+1 | Hamiti 51'; Aoudia 90' | Report | | Stadium: Stade 1er Novembre 1954; Referee: Eddy Maillet (Seychelles) |

| 9 May 2010 Second leg | Atlético Petróleos Luanda (Angola) | 2–1 | (Algeria) JS Kabylie | Luanda |
| 16:00 UTC+1 | Magalhaes 5'; Job 13' | Report | Aoudia 54' | Stadium: Estádio 11 de Novembro; Referee: Daniel Bennett (South Africa) |

== Squad information ==
=== Playing statistics ===
| No. | Pos | Nat | Player | Total | | National 1 | | Algerian Cup | | Champions League | |
| No. | Pos | Nat | Player | Apps | Goals | Apps | Goals | Apps | Goals | Apps | Goals |
|---|---|---|---|---|---|---|---|---|---|---|---|
| | GK | (Algeria) ALG | Mourad Berrefane | 4 | 0 | 3 | 0 | 1 | 0 | 0 | 0 |
| | GK | (Algeria) ALG | Samir Hadjaoui | 40 | 0 | 31 | 0 | 3 | 0 | 6 | 0 |
| | GK | (Algeria) ALG | Nabil Mazari | 1 | 0 | 0 | 0 | 1 | 0 | 0 | 0 |
| | DF | (Mali) MLI | Idrissa Coulibaly | 34 | 2 | 24 | 2 | 4 | 0 | 6 | 0 |
| | DF | (Algeria) ALG | Essaïd Belkalem | 29 | 2 | 20 | 1 | 3 | 0 | 6 | 1 |
| | DF | (Algeria) ALG | Koceila Berchiche | 19 | 0 | 17 | 0 | 2 | 0 | 0 | 0 |
| | DF | (Algeria) ALG | Farid Bellabes | 19 | 2 | 16 | 1 | 2 | 1 | 1 | 0 |
| | DF | (Algeria) ALG | Mohamed Rabie Meftah | 38 | 3 | 28 | 2 | 5 | 0 | 5 | 1 |
| | DF | (Algeria) ALG | Mohamed Khoutir Ziti | 17 | 1 | 12 | 1 | 2 | 0 | 3 | 0 |
| | DF | (Algeria) ALG | Nassim Oussalah | 37 | 1 | 28 | 0 | 3 | 0 | 6 | 1 |
| | DF | (Algeria) ALG | Lyes Boukria | 23 | 0 | 21 | 0 | 1 | 0 | 1 | 0 |
| | DF | (Algeria) ALG | Chemseddine Nessakh | 15 | 1 | 11 | 0 | 3 | 1 | 1 | 0 |
| | MF | (Algeria) ALG | Lamara Douicher | 33 | 0 | 24 | 0 | 4 | 0 | 5 | 0 |
| | MF | (Algeria) ALG | Tayeb Maroci | 27 | 1 | 17 | 1 | 4 | 0 | 6 | 0 |
| | MF | (Algeria) ALG | Abdennour Chérif El-Ouazzani | 39 | 0 | 31 | 0 | 3 | 0 | 5 | 0 |
| | MF | (Algeria) ALG | Saad Tedjar | 37 | 4 | 27 | 3 | 5 | 1 | 5 | 0 |
| | MF | (Algeria) ALG | Lyes Saidi | 14 | 0 | 12 | 0 | 2 | 0 | 0 | 0 |
| | MF | (Algeria) ALG | Mohamed Oussalem Benhocine | 1 | 0 | 1 | 0 | 0 | 0 | 0 | 0 |
| | MF | (Algeria) ALG | Mokhtar Lamhene | 3 | 0 | 3 | 0 | 0 | 0 | 0 | 0 |
| | MF | (Algeria) ALG | Idriss Ech-Chergui | 20 | 2 | 12 | 1 | 4 | 0 | 4 | 1 |
| | FW | (Algeria) ALG | Yassine Akkouche | 26 | 3 | 22 | 3 | 2 | 0 | 2 | 0 |
| | FW | (Algeria) ALG | Mohamed Seguer | 15 | 2 | 11 | 1 | 1 | 0 | 3 | 1 |
| | FW | (Nigeria) NGR | Izu Azuka | 19 | 6 | 14 | 3 | 1 | 3 | 4 | 0 |
| | FW | (Algeria) ALG | Sid Ali Yahia-Chérif | 38 | 11 | 31 | 10 | 3 | 0 | 4 | 1 |
| | FW | (Algeria) ALG | Mohamed Amine Aoudia | 29 | 9 | 19 | 4 | 4 | 2 | 6 | 3 |
| | FW | (Algeria) ALG | Farès Hamiti | 33 | 8 | 25 | 6 | 3 | 0 | 5 | 2 |
Players transferred out during the season
| | MF | (Algeria) ALG | Nassim Dehouche | 3 | 0 | 3 | 0 | 0 | 0 | 0 | 0 |
| | FW | (Algeria) ALG | Mohamed Abdelaziz Tchikou | 7 | 0 | 6 | 0 | 1 | 0 | 0 | 0 |
| | FW | (Algeria) ALG | Karim Braham Chaouch | 15 | 0 | 14 | 0 | 1 | 0 | 0 | 0 |

Last updated: 19 November 2017

=== Goalscorers ===
Includes all competitive matches. The list is sorted alphabetically by surname when total goals are equal.

| No. | Nat. | Player | Pos. | N 1 | AC | CL 1 | TOTAL |
|---|---|---|---|---|---|---|---|
| | (Algeria) | Sid Ali Yahia-Chérif | FW | 10 | 0 | 1 | 11 |
| | (Algeria) | Mohamed Amine Aoudia | FW | 4 | 2 | 3 | 9 |
| | (Algeria) | Farès Hamiti | FW | 6 | 0 | 2 | 8 |
| | (Nigeria) | Izu Azuka | FW | 3 | 3 | 0 | 6 |
| | (Algeria) | Saad Tedjar | MF | 3 | 1 | 0 | 4 |
| | (Algeria) | Yassine Akkouche | FW | 3 | 0 | 0 | 3 |
| | (Algeria) | Mohamed Rabie Meftah | DF | 2 | 0 | 1 | 3 |
| | (Algeria) | Mohamed Seguer | FW | 1 | 0 | 1 | 2 |
| | (Algeria) | Idriss Ech-Chergui | MF | 1 | 0 | 1 | 2 |
| | (Mali) | Idrissa Coulibaly | DF | 2 | 0 | 0 | 2 |
| | (Algeria) | Essaïd Belkalem | DF | 1 | 0 | 1 | 2 |
| | (Algeria) | Farid Bellabes | DF | 1 | 1 | 0 | 2 |
| | (Algeria) | Tayeb Maroci | MF | 1 | 0 | 0 | 1 |
| | (Algeria) | Mohamed Khoutir Ziti | DF | 1 | 0 | 0 | 1 |
| | (Algeria) | Nassim Oussalah | DF | 0 | 0 | 1 | 1 |
| | (Algeria) | Chemseddine Nessakh | DF | 0 | 1 | 0 | 1 |
| Own Goals | | | | 0 | 0 | 0 | 0 |
| Totals | | | | 39 | 8 | 10 | 57 |

== Transfers ==
=== In ===
| Date | Pos | Player | From club | Transfer fee | Source |
|---|---|---|---|---|---|
| 1 July 2009 | GK | (Algeria) Samir Hadjaoui | ES Sétif | Undisclosed | |
| 1 July 2009 | DF | (Algeria) Chemseddine Nessakh | ASM Oran | Undisclosed | |
| 1 July 2009 | DF | (Algeria) Mohamed Khoutir Ziti | ES Sétif | Undisclosed | |
| 1 July 2009 | MF | (Algeria) Abdennour Chérif El-Ouazzani | MC Oran | Undisclosed | |
| 1 July 2009 | MF | (Algeria) Saad Tedjar | Paradou AC | Loan for one year | |
| 1 July 2009 | MF | (Algeria) Idriss Ech-Chergui | (France) Nîmes Olympique | Free transfer | |
| 1 July 2009 | FW | (Algeria) Farès Hamiti | USM Blida | Undisclosed | |
| 1 July 2009 | FW | (Algeria) Mohamed Amine Aoudia | USM Annaba | Undisclosed | |
| 1 July 2009 | FW | (Algeria) Sid Ali Yahia-Chérif | RC Kouba | Free transfer | |
| 23 December 2009 | FW | (Algeria) Mohamed Seguer | ES Sétif | Undisclosed | |

=== Out ===
| Date | Pos | Player | To club | Transfer fee | Source |
|---|---|---|---|---|---|
| 13 June 2009 | GK | (Algeria) Faouzi Chaouchi | ES Sétif | Undisclosed | |
