= 2005–06 JS Kabylie season =

JS Kabylie
2005–06 season
- President: Mohand Chérif Hannachi
- Head Coach: Jean-Yves Chay
- Stadium: Stade du 1^{er} Novembre 1954
- National 1: Champion
- Algerian Cup: Semi-finals
- CAF Champions League: Second round
- Top goalscorer: League: Hamid Berguiga (18 goals); All: Hamid Berguiga (22 goals)

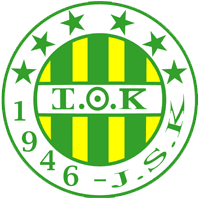
Crest JSK 2002-2010

The 2005–06 season was JS Kabylie's 41st season in the Algerian top flight. They competed in National 1, the Algerian Cup and the Champions League.

== Squad list ==
Players and squad numbers last updated on 25 September 2005.
Note: Flags indicate national team as has been defined under FIFA eligibility rules. Players may hold more than one non-FIFA nationality.

No.	Nat.	Position	Name	Date of birth (age)	Signed from
Goalkeepers
1	(Algeria)	GK	Lounes Gaouaoui	28 September 1977 (aged 28)	(Algeria) USM Drâa Ben Khedda
12	(Algeria)	GK	Nabil Mazari	18 February 1984 (aged 21)	(Algeria) Youth system
25	(Algeria)	GK	Mourad Berrefane	18 March 1986 (aged 19)	(Algeria) Youth system
Defenders
5	(Algeria)	CB	Sofiane Harkat	26 January 1984 (aged 21)	(Algeria) USM El Harrach
30	(Algeria)	RB	Mohamed Rabie Meftah	5 May 1985 (aged 20)	(Algeria) Youth system
24	(Algeria)	LB	Nassim Oussalah	8 October 1981 (aged 24)	(Algeria) MO Béjaïa
27	(Libya)	CB	Omar Daoud	9 April 1983 (aged 22)	(Libya) Olympic Azzaweya
20	(Algeria)	CB	Rahim Meftah	15 August 1980 (aged 25)	(Algeria) Youth system
23	(Algeria)	CB	Anwar Boudjakdji	1 September 1976 (aged 29)	(Algeria) CR Belouizdad
22	(Algeria)	CB	Noureddine Drioueche	27 October 1973 (aged 32)	(Algeria) JS Bordj Ménaïel
4	(Algeria)	CB	Kamel Habri	5 March 1976 (aged 29)	(Algeria) JSM Bejaïa
2	(Algeria)	RB	Slimane Raho	20 October 1975 (aged 30)	(Algeria) MC Oran
15	(Algeria)	CB	Samir Zazou	24 March 1980 (aged 25)	(Algeria) CR Belouizdad
19	(Algeria)		Samir Djouder	29 March 1981 (aged 24)	(Algeria) ?
Midfielders
18	(Algeria)	DM	Lamara Douicher	10 March 1980 (aged 25)	(Algeria) NR Béni Douala
6	(Algeria)	DM	Nassim Hamlaoui	25 February 1981 (aged 24)	(Algeria) Youth system
25	(Algeria)	CM	Fahem Ouslati	14 March 1986 (aged 19)	(Algeria) CR Belouizdad
21	(Algeria)	AM	Kamel Marek	6 February 1980 (aged 25)	(Algeria) MO Béjaïa
10	(Algeria)	DM	Reda Benhadj Djillali	31 May 1978 (aged 27)	(Algeria) ASO Chlef
8	(Algeria)	DM	Lounés Bendahmane	3 April 1977 (aged 28)	(Algeria) JS Bordj Ménaïel
Forwards
17	(Benin)		Wassiou Oladipupo	17 December 1983 (aged 22)	(Libya) Olympic Azzaweya
11	(Algeria)	ST	Nabil Hemani	1 September 1979 (aged 26)	(Algeria) OMR El Annasser
7	(Algeria)	ST	Hamza Yacef	25 August 1979 (aged 26)	(Algeria) NA Hussein Dey
16	(Algeria)		Hamid Berguiga	25 April 1974 (aged 31)	(Algeria) USM El Harrach
14	(Algeria)		Mohand Larbi	9 April 1982 (aged 23)	(Algeria) Youth system
9	(Republic of the Congo)		Wilfried Urbain Elvis Endzanga	28 March 1980 (aged 25)	(Cameroon) Coton Sport

== Competitions ==
=== Overview ===
Competition	Record								Started round	Final position / round	First match	Last match
Competition	G	W	D	L	GF	GA	GD	Win %	Started round	Final position / round	First match	Last match
National 1	30	17	7	6	47	21	+26	56.67	—N/a	Champion	25 August 2005	25 May 2006
Algerian Cup	5	3	2	0	11	1	+10	60.00	Round of 64	Semi-finals	29 December 2005	2 June 2006
2006 Champions League	6	3	1	2	11	4	+7	50.00	Preliminary round	Second round	19 February 2006	30 April 2006
Total	41	23	10	8	69	26	+43	56.10				

Updated to match played 3 June 2019
Source: Competitions

=== National 1 ===
==== League table ====
Pos	Team	Pld	W	D	L	GF	GA	GD	Pts	Qualification or relegation
1	JS Kabylie (C)	30	17	7	6	47	21	+26	58	2007 CAF Champions League
2	USM Alger	30	18	6	6	50	30	+20	57 (Note: USM Alger were deducted three points)	2007 CAF Champions League
3	ASO Chlef	30	15	7	8	45	25	+20	52	2007 CAF Confederation Cup
4	ES Sétif	30	14	5	11	30	26	+4	47	2006–07 Arab Champions League
5	CA Bordj Bou Arreridj	30	13	7	10	22	24	−2	46	2006–07 Arab Champions League

Source: DZFOOT.COM
Rules for classification: 1) points; 2) goal difference; 3) number of goals scored.
(C) Champions

==== Results summary ====
Overall								Home						Away					
Pld	W	D	L	GF	GA	GD	Pts	W	D	L	GF	GA	GD	W	D	L	GF	GA	GD
30	17	7	6	47	21	+26	58	11	2	2	36	10	+26	6	5	4	11	11	0

Last updated: 22 April 2018.
Source: Competitive matches

==== Results by round ====
Round	1	2	3	4	5	6	7	8	9	10	11	12	13	14	15	16	17	18	19	20	21	22	23	24	25	26	27	28	29	30
Ground	H	A	H	A	H	H	A	H	A	H	A	H	A	H	A	A	H	A	H	A	A	H	A	H	A	H	A	H	A	H
Result	W	W	W	W	D	D	L	W	L	W	W	W	D	W	W	D	W	L	W	W	W	W	D	L	D	L	D	W	L	W
Position	1	1	1	1	1	1	2	1	2	2	1	1	1	1	1	1	1	1	1	1	1	1	1	1	1	1	1	1	1	1

Source: Competitive matches
A = Away; H = Home; W = Win; D = Draw; L = Loss

=== Matches ===
Win Draw Loss

25 August 2005 Round 1	JS Kabylie	3–0	USM Blida	Tizi Ouzou
16:00	Berguiga 45+2', 56'; Yacef 81'	Report		Stadium: Stade 1er Novembre 1954; Referee: Mohamed Benouza

8 September 2005 Round 2	NA Hussein Dey	0–1	JS Kabylie	Algiers
16:00		Report	Hemani 76'	Stadium: Stade Frères Zioui; Referee: Mohamed Bichari

3 October 2005 Round 3	JS Kabylie	3–0	USM Alger	Tizi Ouzou
	Berguiga 35'	Report		Stadium: Stade 1er Novembre 1954; Referee: Djamel Haimoudi

22 September 2005 Round 4	CA Batna	0–1	JS Kabylie	Batna
16:00		Report	Yacef 75'	Stadium: Stade 1er Novembre 1954; Referee: Houari Belkacem

26 September 2005 Round 5	JS Kabylie	2–2	CS Constantine	Tizi Ouzou
16:00	Oussalah 72'; Boudjakdji 78'	Report	Fenier 13'; Djabelkheir 47'	Stadium: Stade 1er Novembre 1954; Referee: Touati Djaballah

13 October 2005 Round 6	JS Kabylie	0–0	WA Tlemcen	Tizi Ouzou
16:00		Report		Stadium: Stade 1er Novembre 1954; Attendance: 0 (close doors); Referee: Farouk Ouchène

21 October 2005 Round 7	Paradou AC	3–0	JS Kabylie	Bologhine
16:00	Athmani 30'; Hamouda 50'; Maidi 64'	Report		Stadium: Stade Omar Hammadi; Referee: Mohamed Amine Benaissa

27 October 2005 Round 8	JS Kabylie	4–1	USM Annaba	Tizi Ouzou
16:00	Boudjakdji 20'; Yacef 42'; Berguiga 65'; Oussalah 83'	Report	Bensaïd 63'	Stadium: Stade 1er Novembre 1954; Referee: Mohamed Abdessamad

10 November 2005 Round 9	CR Belouizdad	1–0	JS Kabylie	Algiers
16:00	Amroune 25'	Report		Stadium: Stade 20 Août 1955; Referee: Mohamed Benouza

5 December 2005 Round 10	JS Kabylie	2–1	MC Alger	Tizi Ouzou
16:00	Berguiga 40'; Oussalah 90'	Report	Largot 47'	Stadium: Stade 1er Novembre 1954; Referee: Abdelhamid Aouiti

24 November 2005 Round 11	ASO Chlef	0–1	JS Kabylie	Chlef
16:00		Report	Oussalah 82'	Stadium: Stade Mohamed Boumezrag; Referee: Belkacem Boumaza

1 December 2005 Round 12	JS Kabylie	2–0	CA Bordj Bou Arreridj	Tizi Ouzou
16:00	Hamlaoui 22', 70'	Report		Stadium: Stade 1er Novembre 1954; Referee: Mustapha Boumediene Mansouri

8 December 2005 Round 13	ES Sétif	0–0	JS Kabylie	Sétif
16:00		Report		Stadium: Stade 8 Mai 1945; Referee: Redouane Mehidi

15 December 2005 Round 14	JS Kabylie	3–1	MC Oran	Tizi Ouzou
16:00	Berguiga 13', 61', 66'	Report	Meddahi 10'	Stadium: Stade 1er Novembre 1954; Referee: Farouk Ouchène

19 December 2005 Round 15	US Biskra	0–1	JS Kabylie	Biskra
16:00		Report	Berguiga 60'	Stadium: Stade du 18 Février; Referee: Houari Belkacem

19 January 2006 Round 16	USM Blida	1–1	JS Kabylie	Blida
16:00	Tall 67'	Report	Hamlaoui 37' (pen.)	Stadium: Stade Mustapha Tchaker; Referee: Abdelhamid Aouiti

26 January 2006 Round 17	JS Kabylie	3–0	NA Hussein Dey	Tizi Ouzou
16:00	Djillali 59'; Berguiga 89'; Habri 90+3'	Report		Stadium: Stade 1er Novembre 1954; Referee: Mohamed Khelifi

30 January 2006 Round 18	USM Alger	1–0	JS Kabylie	Bologhine
	Haddou 22'	Report		Stadium: Omar Hamadi Stadium; Referee: Redouane Mehidi

2 February 2006 Round 19	JS Kabylie	1–0	CA Batna	Tizi Ouzou
16:00	Berguiga 83'	Report		Stadium: Stade 1er Novembre 1954; Referee: Houari Belkacem

6 March 2006 Round 20	CS Constantine	0–1	JS Kabylie	Constantine
16:00		Report	Hemani 16'	Stadium: Stade Ramdane Benabdelmalek; Referee: Mustapha Boumediene Mansouri

23 February 2006 Round 21	WA Tlemcen	1–3	JS Kabylie	Tlemcen
16:00	Sylla 42'	Report	Boudjakdji 10'; Yacef 40', 77'	Stadium: Stade Akid Lotfi; Referee: Rachid Bouziani

9 March 2006 Round 22	JS Kabylie	3–0	Paradou AC	Tizi Ouzou
16:00	Berguiga 26' (pen.), 75' (pen.); Marek 60'	Report		Stadium: Stade 1er Novembre 1954; Referee: Mohamed Khelifi

10 April 2006 Round 23	USM Annaba	0–0	JS Kabylie	Annaba
16:00		Report		Stadium: Stade 19 Mai 1956; Referee: Mohamed Benouza

23 March 2006 Round 24	JS Kabylie	1–2	CR Belouizdad	Tizi Ouzou
16:00	Berguiga 45+2'	Report	Harkas 50'; Amroune 55'	Stadium: Stade 1er Novembre 1954; Referee: Mohamed Amine Benaissa

8 May 2006 Round 25	MC Alger	1–1	JS Kabylie	Algiers
16:00	Bouguèche 82'	Report	Yacef 74'	Stadium: Stade 5 Juillet 1962; Referee: Djamel Haimoudi

13 April 2006 Round 26	JS Kabylie	0–1	ASO Chlef	Tizi Ouzou
16:00		Report	Boukhari 43'	Stadium: Stade 1er Novembre 1954; Referee: Rabah Boukedjar

11 May 2006 Round 27	CA Bordj Bou Arreridj	0–0	JS Kabylie	Bordj Bou Arréridj
16:00		Report		Stadium: Stade 20 Août 1955; Referee: Mohamed Benouza

15 May 2006 Round 28	JS Kabylie	4–2	ES Sétif	Tizi Ouzou
16:00	Berguiga 1', 50' (pen.); Meftah 16'; Hemani 21'	Report	Hadj Aïssa 15'; Bourahli 75'	Stadium: Stade 1er Novembre 1954; Attendance: 0 (close doors); Referee: Mohamed Amine Belhacène

18 May 2006 Round 29	MC Oran	3–1	JS Kabylie	Oran
16:00	Daoud 10' (pen.), 70'; Boukessassa 37'	Report	Boudjakdji 26'	Stadium: Stade Ahmed Zabana; Referee: Mohamed Khelifi

25 May 2006 Round 30	JS Kabylie	5–0	US Biskra	Tizi Ouzou
16:00	Yacef 10'; Meftah 23'; Berguiga 32' (pen.), 38'; Oussalah 67'	Report		Stadium: Stade 1er Novembre 1954; Attendance: 0 (close doors); Referee: Mohamed Abdessamad

== Algerian Cup ==
29 December 2005 Round of 64	MC Mekhadma	0–6	JS Kabylie	Laghouat
14:30
Note: Lineup for JS Kabylie - .

9 February 2006 Round of 32	JS Kabylie	3–0	NARB Réghaïa	Bouïra
14:30				Stadium: Stade Rabah Bitat
Note: Lineup for JS Kabylie - .

6 April 2006 Round of 16	ES Guelma	0–1 (a.e.t.)	JS Kabylie	Guelma
17:00		Report	Yacef 110'	Stadium: Stade Abd Ali

1 June 2006 Quarter-finals	NA Hussein Dey	1–1 (a.e.t.) (2–4 p)	JS Kabylie	Boumerdès
17:00	Khedis 46'	Report	Berguiga 11'	Stadium: Stade Djillali Bounâama; Referee: Mohamed Amine Belhacène

8 June 2006 Semi-finals	USM Alger	0–0 (a.e.t.) (3–2 p)	JS Kabylie	Blida
17:00		Report		Stadium: Stade Mustapha Tchaker; Referee: Houari Belkacem
	Penalties
	Haddou (penalty missed); Hamdoud (penalty scored); Ammour (penalty scored); Belkaid (penalty missed); Achiou (penalty scored)		(penalty scored) Boudjakdji; (penalty missed) Berguiga; (penalty missed) Daoud; (penalty missed) Hemani; (penalty scored) Djouder

== Champions League ==
=== Preliminary round ===
19 February 2006 First leg	Al-Ittihad (Libya)	1–1	(Algeria) JS Kabylie	Tripoli
17:00 UTC+1	Camara 60'	Report	Hamlaoui 22'	Stadium: June 11 Stadium

5 March 2006 Second leg	JS Kabylie (Algeria)	4–0	(Libya) Al-Ittihad
	Yacef 17', 57', 63'; Daoud 87' (pen.)	Report

=== First round ===
18 March 2006 First leg	Zanaco FC (Zambia)	1–0	(Algeria) JS Kabylie	Lusaka
	Lwipa 16'	Report		Stadium: Sunset Stadium

31 March 2006 Second leg	JS Kabylie (Algeria)	3–0	(Zambia) Zanaco FC
	Berguiga 69', 90'; Yacef 75'	Report		Referee: Abdallah Laachiri (Morocco)

=== Second round ===
23 April 2006 First leg	JS Kabylie (Algeria)	3–1	(Morocco) Raja Casablanca	Algiers
	Yacef 47', 79'; Berguiga 89'	Report	Alloudi 88'	Stadium: Stade du 5 Juillet; Referee: Modou Sowe (Gambia)

30 April 2006 Second leg	Raja Casablanca (Morocco)	1–0	(Algeria) JS Kabylie	Casablanca
	Chkilite 13'	Report		Stadium: Stade Mohamed V Referee: Mourad Daami (Tunisia)

== Squad information ==
=== Playing statistics ===
No.	Pos	Nat	Player	Total		National 1		Algerian Cup		Champions League	
No.	Pos	Nat	Player	Apps	Goals	Apps	Goals	Apps	Goals	Apps	Goals
1	GK	(Algeria) ALG	Lounes Gaouaoui	39	0	30	0	3	0	6	0
25	GK	(Algeria) ALG	Mourad Berrefane	0	0	0	0	0	0	0	0
12	GK	(Algeria) ALG	Nabil Mazari	1	0	1	0	0	0	0	0
27	DF	(Libya) LBY	Omar Daoud	25	1	17	0	3	0	5	1
22	DF	(Algeria) ALG	Noureddine Drioueche	19	0	13	0	1	0	5	0
23	DF	(Algeria) ALG	Anwar Boudjakdji	37	4	29	4	2	0	6	0
20	DF	(Algeria) ALG	Rahim Meftah	29	0	20	0	3	0	6	0
5	DF	(Algeria) ALG	Sofiane Harkat	29	0	24	0	0	0	5	0
30	DF	(Algeria) ALG	Mohamed Rabie Meftah	28	2	19	2	3	0	6	0
4	DF	(Algeria) ALG	Kamel Habri	22	1	14	1	3	0	5	0
24	DF	(Algeria) ALG	Nassim Oussalah	29	5	24	5	2	0	3	0
2	DF	(Algeria) ALG	Slimane Raho	20	0	16	0	1	0	3	0
15	DF	(Algeria) ALG	Samir Zazou	35	0	28	0	1	0	6	0
19	DF	(Algeria) ALG	Samir Djouder	10	0	7	0	3	0	0	0
18	MF	(Algeria) ALG	Lamara Douicher	10	0	10	0	0	0	0	0
6	MF	(Algeria) ALG	Nassim Hamlaoui	34	4	26	3	2	0	6	1
25	MF	(Algeria) ALG	Fahem Ouslati	3	0	3	0	0	0	0	0
21	MF	(Algeria) ALG	Kamel Marek	14	1	9	1	3	0	2	0
10	MF	(Algeria) ALG	Reda Benhadj Djillali	18	1	13	1	1	0	4	0
17	FW	(Benin) BEN	Wassiou Oladipupo	12	0	10	0	2	0	0	0
7	FW	(Algeria) ALG	Hamza Yacef	35	14	27	7	2	1	6	6
11	FW	(Algeria) ALG	Nabil Hemani	33	3	26	3	3	0	4	0
16	FW	(Algeria) ALG	Hamid Berguiga	37	22	29	18	3	1	5	3
14	FW	(Algeria) ALG	Mohand Larbi	1	0	1	0	0	0	0	0
Players transferred out during the season
8	MF	(Algeria) ALG	Lounés Bendahmane	7	0	7	0	0	0	0	0
	FW	(Republic of the Congo) CGO	Wilfried Urbain Elvis Endzanga	1	0	1	0	0	0	0	0

Last updated: 13 November 2020

=== Goalscorers ===
Includes all competitive matches. The list is sorted alphabetically by surname when total goals are equal.

No.	Nat.	Player	Pos.	L 1	AC	CL 1	TOTAL
16	(Algeria)	Hamid Berguiga	FW	18	1	3	22
7	(Algeria)	Hamza Yacef	FW	7	1	6	14
24	(Algeria)	Nassim Oussalah	DF	5	0	0	5
6	(Algeria)	Nassim Hamlaoui	MF	3	0	1	4
23	(Algeria)	Anwar Boudjakdji	DF	4	0	0	4
11	(Algeria)	Nabil Hemani	FW	3	0	0	3
30	(Algeria)	Mohamed Rabie Meftah	DF	2	0	0	2
4	(Algeria)	Kamel Habri	DF	1	0	0	1
27	(Libya)	Omar Daoud	DF	1	0	0	1
21	(Algeria)	Kamel Marek	MF	1	0	0	1
10	(Algeria)	Reda Benhadj Djillali	MF	1	0	0	1
Own Goals				0	0	0	0
Totals				43	2	10	55

== Transfers ==
=== In ===
Date	Pos	Player	From club	Transfer fee	Source
1 July 2005	DF	(Algeria) Sofiane Harkat	USM El Harrach	Undisclosed	
1 July 2005	DF	(Libya) Omar Daoud	(Libya) Olympic Azzaweya	Undisclosed	
1 July 2005	DF	(Algeria) Nassim Oussalah	MO Béjaïa	Undisclosed	
1 July 2005	MF	(Algeria) Kamel Marek	MO Béjaïa	Undisclosed	
1 July 2005	FW	(Benin) Wassiou Oladipupo	(Libya) Olympic Azzaweya	Undisclosed	
1 July 2005	FW	(Algeria) Hamza Yacef	NA Hussein Dey	Undisclosed	
1 July 2005	FW	(Algeria) Nabil Hemani	OMR El Annasser	Undisclosed	

=== Out ===
Date	Pos	Player	To club	Transfer fee	Source
1 January 2006	MF	(Algeria) Lounés Bendahmane	USM Annaba	Undisclosed	
1 January 2006	FW	(Republic of the Congo) Wilfried Urbain Elvis Endzanga	USM Blida	Undisclosed	
