= Osagie =

- Gender: Male
- Language: Edo

Origin
- Origin: Nigeria
- Meaning: godsent

Other names
- Variant forms: Osaghie, Osaghae, Osaghee, Osaje

Osagie (also spelled Osaghae, Osaghie, Osaghee and Osaje) is both a family name and masculine given name of Nigerian origin. It is used by the Edo and means godsent.

== Notable individuals with the name ==
- Abubakar Bello-Osagie (born 1988), Nigerian footballer.
- Andrew Osagie (born 1988), British middle-distance runner.
- Bright Edomwonyi (born 1994), Nigerian footballer.
- Francis Edo-Osagie (born 1914), Nigerian timber businessman.
- Godwin Osagie Abbe (born 1949), Nigerian politician and Defence Minister.
- Hakeem Bello-Osagie (born c. 1945), Nigerian petroleum businessman.
- Junior Osagie (born 1985), Nigerian footballer.
- Osagie Alegimenlen, Corporate Management, businessman.
- Eghosa E. Osaghae, Nigerian politics academic and former vice-chancellor.
- Omo Osaghae (born 1988), Nigerian American hurdler.
- Elliot Osagìe, Nigerian-American music executive.
