= CAF Confederation Cup =

Second-tier African club football competition

- Organiser(s): CAF
- Founded: 2004; 22 years ago
- Region: Africa
- Teams: 16 (group stage); 58 (total)
- Qualifier for: CAF Super Cup
- Related competitions: CAF Champions League
- Current champions: (Algeria) USM Alger (2nd title)
- Most championships: (Morocco) RS Berkane (Tunisia) CS Sfaxien (3 titles each)
- Website: cafonline.com/confederation-cup
- 2026–27 CAF Confederation Cup

The CAF Confederation Cup, known as the TotalEnergies CAF Confederation Cup (Coupe de la confédération de la CAF TotalEnergies in French) for sponsorship purposes, is an annual association football club competition established in 2004 and organized by CAF.

Clubs qualify for the competition based on their performance in their national leagues and cup competitions. It is the second-tier competition of African club football, ranking below the CAF Champions League. The winner of the tournament faces the winner of the aforementioned competition in the following season's CAF Super Cup.

Moroccan clubs have the highest number of victories (eight titles), followed by Tunisia with five. Morocco has the largest number of winning teams, with five clubs having won the title. The competition has been won by 14 clubs, six of which have won it more than once. RS Berkane and CS Sfaxien are the most successful clubs in the competition's history, having won the tournament three times each. USM ALGER are the current defending champions, having beaten Zamalek.

== History ==
Winners CAF Confederation Cup
Season	Winner
2004	(Ghana) Hearts of Oak
2005	(Morocco) AS FAR
2006	(Tunisia) Étoile du Sahel
2007	(Tunisia) CS Sfaxien
2008	(Tunisia) CS Sfaxien (2)
2009	(Mali) Stade Malien
2010	(Morocco) FUS de Rabat
2011	(Morocco) MAS Fez
2012	(Republic of the Congo) AC Léopards
2013	(Tunisia) CS Sfaxien (3)
2014	(Egypt) Al Ahly
2015	(Tunisia) Étoile du Sahel (2)
2016	(Democratic Republic of the Congo) TP Mazembe
2017	(Democratic Republic of the Congo) TP Mazembe (2)
2018	(Morocco) Raja CA
2019	(Egypt) Zamalek
2020	(Morocco) RS Berkane
2021	(Morocco) Raja CA (2)
2022	(Morocco) RS Berkane (2)
2023	(Algeria) USM Alger
2024	(Egypt) Zamalek (2)
2025	(Morocco) RS Berkane (3)
2026	(Algeria) USM Alger (2)

In 2004, CAF merged the African Cup Winners' Cup created in 1975 with the CAF Cup introduced in 1992 to form a new competition called the Confederation Cup, which has since become the secondary African club competition.

In the first edition, the Ghanaian club Hearts of Oak won the edition by beating another Ghanaian club, Asante Kotoko in the final on Penalties. The following year, Moroccan club AS FAR won the cup against Nigeria's Dolphin FC. In 2006, Tunisian club Étoile du Sahel won the cup against Moroccan AS FAR (thanks to the away goals rule).

The Tunisian club CS Sfaxien won the cup in 2007 by beating the Sudanese Al Merreikh 5 goals to 2 in aggregate score (4–2, 1–0). The following season, Club Sfaxien again won the cup against another Tunisian club, Étoile du Sahel. In 2009, Stade Malien won the edition by beating the Algerian club ES Sétif in the final, on penalties. The following season, the Moroccan club Fath Union Sport won the cup against Tunisian Club Sfaxien, winning the return match 3 to 2.

In 2011, Moroccan club Maghreb Fès defeated Tunisia's Club Africain in the final, on penalties. The following year, Congolese club AC Léopards beat Malian club Djoliba AC in the final. The 2013 edition saw CS Sfaxien win against Congolese TP Mazembe. In 2014, the Egyptian club Al Ahly obtained its first confederation cup by beating the Ivorian club Séwé FC. In 2015, Étoile du Sahel again won the cup by beating South African club Orlando Pirates. TP Mazembe achieved the double in 2016 and 2017, beating Algerian club MO Béjaïa and South African SuperSport United respectively.

Moroccan club Raja CA won in 2018 against Congolese AS Vita Club. In 2019, Zamalek SC beat Moroccan RS Berkane in the final, on Penalties.

In 2020 in the context of the COVID-19 pandemic, the matches were then played behind closed doors, the Moroccan club RS Berkane beat the Egyptians of Pyramids FC by the score of 1 to 0. Since this season, the final has been played in a single game. In 2021, the Moroccan club Raja CA won the cup for the second time by beating JS Kabylie in the final with a score of 2 to 1.

In 2022, Moroccan club RS Berkane won the cup for the second time, beating South African club Orlando Pirates in the final on penalties. On 3 June 2023, USM Alger became the first Algerian club to win the confederation cup after beating Young Africans in the 2023 final.

In 2024, Egyptian Giant, Zamalek SC won the cup for the second time, beating Moroccan club RS Berkane in the final on away goals rule. This was the second title for Zamalek SC after their win over the same team back in 2019, which made Zamalek SC the second most successful team after CS Sfaxien with 3 titles. On 25 May 2025, RS Berkane won its third title after defeating Simba S.C. in the final, becoming the joint-most successful club in the tournament's history. This victory places the Moroccan side alongside Tunisia's CS Sfaxien, with both clubs now holding a record three titles each.

== Qualification ==
The competition is composed of domestic cup winners from all 54 CAF member associations and the third-placed-finished club in the domestic leagues of the top twelve-ranked associations discounting/excluding the present year/season.

=== Format ===
The competition is played into two phases; the qualification phase and the main phase.

=== Qualification phase ===
The competition begins with a preliminary round and then a first qualifying round played in a "trim-down" knock-out format with the away goals rule serving as tiebreakers.

=== Main phase ===
- The sixteen winning teams from the second qualifying round enter the group stage divided into four groups of four. Each team will play against the other three opponents in a round-robin system three points for a win.
- The group winners and runners-up qualify to a two-legged knock-out rounds which shall be played in two matches, home and away in three rounds (quarter-finals, semi-finals and the finals).
- In case of equality in the number of goals scored during the two matches, the team scoring the greatest number of away goals will be declared winner. If the number of goals scored on the away matches is equal, kicks from the penalty mark will be taken.

=== The Super Cup ===
The winners will face the CAF Champions League winners in the CAF Super Cup the following season on the former's home venue.

== Sponsorship ==
In October 2004, MTN contracted a four-year deal to sponsor CAF's competitions worth US$12.5 million, which at that time was the biggest sponsorship deal in African sporting history.

In 2008, CAF put a value of €100 million for a comprehensive and long-term package of its competitions when it opened tenders for a new sponsor, which was scooped up by French telecommunications giant Orange through the signing of an eight-year deal in July the following year, whose terms were not disclosed.

On 21 July 2016, French energy and petroleum giant Total S.A. (renamed TotalEnergies in 2021) secured an eight-year sponsorship package from CAF to sponsor its competitions, beginning with its flagship competition, the Africa Cup of Nations.

Current Sponsors:

Title Sponsor	Official Sponsors	Former Sponsor	Ball Supplier
TotalEnergies	Orange; 1xBet; TikTok	QNET	Umbro

== Prizes ==
=== Trophy and medals ===
Each year, the winning team is presented with the African Champion Clubs' Cup, the current version of which has been awarded since the competition name change in 1997. Forty gold medals are presented to the competition winners and 40 silver medals to the runners-up. On May 25, 2025, CAF unveiled a new TotalEnergies CAF Confederation Cup trophy, marking a bold step in modernizing its competitions. The redesigned trophy symbolizes ambition, unity, and African pride, featuring a matte-gold football topped with a polished-gold map of Africa, supported by two upward-reaching arms to represent strength and solidarity. Its body combines shiny silver with a striking gold lightning streak to convey energy and competitiveness, while the marble base—engraved with the competition's name and past winners—adds a touch of tradition and prestige. Standing 45 cm tall and weighing between 8–10 kg, the new trophy reflects CAF's dedication to celebrating the excellence of African club football.

=== 2009–2020 ===
CAF increased the prize money to be shared between the top 16 clubs.

Final position	Prize money
Winners	US$1,250,000
Runners-up	US$625,000
Semi-finalists	US$450,000
Quarter-finalists	US$350,000
3rd in group stage	US$275,000
4th in group stage	US$275,000

Note: National Associations receive an additional equivalent share of 5% for each amount awarded to clubs.

=== 2023–2025 ===
On 16 August 2024, CAF announced an increase in the prize money to be shared between the 16 group stage clubs including preliminary stages teams, which is the latest tranche, as follows:

Final position	Prize money
Winners	US$2,000,000
Runners-up	US$1,000,000
Semi-finalists	US$750,000
Quarter-finalists	US$550,000
3rd in group stage	US$400,000
4th in group stage	US$400,000
Preliminary stages	US$50,000

=== 2026–present ===
In March 2026, further increases were announced, as follows:

Final position	Prize money
Winners	US$4,000,000
Runners-up	US$2,000,000
Semi-finalists	US$1,250,000
Quarter-finalists	
3rd in group stage	
4th in group stage	
Preliminary stages	US$100,000

== Broadcast coverage ==
Below are the current broadcast rights holders of this competition:

Country/Region	Channels
Algeria	EPTV
ASEAN	beIN Sports
Benin	ORTB
Europe	Sportfive
France	beIN Sports
Burkina Faso	RTB
Latin America	ESPN
Ghana	GTV Sports+; StarTimes
(Arab League) MENA	beIN Sports
South Africa	SuperSport; SABC Sport
Western Balkans	Sport Klub
United States	beIN Sports
Sub-Saharan Africa	Canal+; SuperSport (selected matches); StarTimes (except South Africa)
East Africa	TVZ; ZBC

== Records and statistics ==
=== Performance by club ===
Performance in the CAF Confederation Cup by club
Club	Titles	Runners-up	Seasons won	Seasons runners-up
(Morocco) RS Berkane	3	2	2020, 2022, 2025	2019, 2024
(Tunisia) CS Sfaxien	3	1	2007, 2008, 2013	2010
(Tunisia) Étoile du Sahel	2	1	2006, 2015	2008
(Democratic Republic of the Congo) TP Mazembe	2	1	2016, 2017	2013
(Egypt) Zamalek	2	1	2019, 2024	2026
(Morocco) Raja CA	2	0	2018, 2021	
(Algeria) USM Alger	2	0	2023, 2026	
(Morocco) FAR Rabat	1	1	2005	2006
(Ghana) Hearts of Oak	1	0	2004	
(Mali) Stade Malien	1	0	2009	
(Morocco) FUS Rabat	1	0	2010	
(Morocco) MAS Fez	1	0	2011	
(Republic of the Congo) AC Léopards	1	0	2012	
(Egypt) Al Ahly	1	0	2014	
(South Africa) Orlando Pirates	0	2		2015, 2022
(Ghana) Asante Kotoko	0	1		2004
(Nigeria) Dolphins FC	0	1		2005
(Sudan) Al-Merrikh	0	1		2007
(Algeria) ES Sétif	0	1		2009
(Tunisia) Club Africain	0	1		2011
(Mali) Djoliba AC	0	1		2012
(Ivory Coast) Séwé Sport	0	1		2014
(Algeria) MO Béjaïa	0	1		2016
(South Africa) SuperSport United	0	1		2017
(Democratic Republic of the Congo) AS Vita Club	0	1		2018
(Egypt) Pyramids	0	1		2020
(Algeria) JS Kabylie	0	1		2021
(Tanzania) Young Africans	0	1		2023
(Tanzania) Simba	0	1		2025

=== Performance by nation ===
Performances in finals by nation
Nation	Winners	Runners-up	Total
Morocco	8	3	11
Tunisia	5	3	8
Egypt	3	2	5
Algeria	2	3	5
DR Congo	2	2	4
Ghana	1	1	2
Mali	1	1	2
Congo	1	0	1
South Africa	0	3	3
Tanzania	0	2	2
Ivory Coast	0	1	1
Nigeria	0	1	1
Sudan	0	1	1

=== Champions by region ===
Federation (Region)	Champion(s)	Titles
UNAF (North Africa)	RS Berkane (3), Club Sfaxien (3), Étoile du Sahel (2), Raja CA (2), USM Alger (2), Zamalek (2), Al Ahly (1), FAR Rabat (1), FUS Rabat (1), MAS Fez (1)	18
UNIFFAC (Central Africa)	TP Mazembe (2), AC Léopards (1)	3
WAFU (West Africa)	Hearts of Oak (1), Stade Malien (1)	2
CECAFA (East Africa)		0
COSAFA (Southern Africa)		0

=== Top goalscorers ===
Year	Footballer	Club	Goals
2004	(Nigeria) Ugochukwu Okeke (Zambia) Christopher Katongo	(Nigeria) Enugu Rangers (Zambia) Green Buffaloes	5
2005	(Ghana) Eric Gawu (Morocco) Khalid El Hirech (Nigeria) Kelechi Osunwa	(Ghana) King Faisal Babes (Tunisia) AS Marsa (Nigeria) Dolphins FC	7
2006	(Angola) Manucho	(Angola) Petro Atlético	8
2007	(Democratic Republic of the Congo) Trésor Mputu	(Democratic Republic of the Congo) TP Mazembe	11
2008	(Ghana) Eric Bekoe	(Ghana) Asante Kotoko	10
2009	(Algeria) Abdelmalek Ziaya	(Algeria) ES Sétif	15
2010	(Egypt) Ahmed Abdel-Ghani	(Egypt) Haras El Hodood	7
2011	(Democratic Republic of the Congo) Salakiaku Matondo	(Democratic Republic of the Congo) DC Motema Pembe	6
2012	(Republic of the Congo) Rudy Ndey (Mali) Ismaïla Diarra (Zimbabwe) Edward Sadomba	(Republic of the Congo) AC Léopards (Mali) Cercle Olympique de Bamako (Sudan) Al-Hilal	5
2013	(Ivory Coast) Vincent Die Foneye (Tanzania) Mbwana Samatta (Mozambique) Sonito	(Egypt) ENPPI (Democratic Republic of the Congo) TP Mazembe (Mozambique) Liga Muçulmana	6
2014	(Republic of the Congo) Kader Bidimbou (Zimbabwe) Kudakwashe Musharu (Ivory Coast) Koffi Foba	(Republic of the Congo) AC Léopards (Zimbabwe) How Mine (Ivory Coast) ASEC Mimosas	6
2015	(Algeria) Baghdad Bounedjah (Gabon) Georges Ambourouet (South Africa) Thamsanqa Gabuza	(Tunisia) Étoile du Sahel (Gabon) CF Mounana (South Africa) Orlando Pirates	6
2016	(Zambia) Rainford Kalaba	(Democratic Republic of the Congo) TP Mazembe	7
2017	(Democratic Republic of the Congo) Ben Malango	(Democratic Republic of the Congo) TP Mazembe	6
2018	(Morocco) Mahmoud Benhalib	(Morocco) Raja CA	9
2019	(Sudan) Waleed Al-Shoala	(Sudan) Al-Hilal	7
2020	(Morocco) Karim El Berkaoui	(Morocco) Hassania Agadir	8
2021	(Democratic Republic of the Congo) Ben Malango	(Morocco) Raja CA	6
2022	(Niger) Victorien Adebayor	(Niger) USGN	6
2023	(Democratic Republic of the Congo) Fiston Kalala Mayele	(Tanzania) Young Africans	7
2024	(Senegal) Paul Bassène	(Morocco) RS Berkane	4
2024	(Mali) Abdoulaye Kanou	(Algeria) USM Alger	4
2024	(Ghana) Abdul Aziz Issah	(Ghana) Dreams FC	4
2024	(Ghana) John Antwi	(Ghana) Dreams FC	4
2025	(Morocco) Oussama Lamlioui (Algeria) Ismaïl Belkacemi	(Morocco) RS Berkane (Algeria) USM Alger	5
2026	(Algeria) Abdennour Belhocini (Algeria) Ahmed Khaldi (Palestine) Oday Dabbagh (Morocco) Sofian El Moudane	(Algeria) CR Belouizdad (Algeria) USM Alger (Egypt) Zamalek SC (Morocco) Olympic Club Safi	4

== See also ==
- Copa Sudamericana – South American equivalent
- AFC Champions League Two – Asian equivalent
- UEFA Europa League – European equivalent
- List of association football competitions
- CAF Women's Champions League
- African Cup Winners' Cup
- CAF Champions League
- CAF Super Cup
- CAF Cup
