= 2008 CAF Confederation Cup =

International football competition in Africa

Confederation of African Football Confederation Cup

Tournament details
- Dates: 16 February – 22 November
- Teams: 53 (from 37 confederations)

Final positions
- Champions: (Tunisia) CS Sfaxien (2nd title)
- Runners-up: (Tunisia) ES Sahel

Tournament statistics
- Matches played: 102
- Goals scored: 262 (2.57 per match)
- Top scorer: (Ghana) Eric Bekoe (10 goals)

The 2008 CAF Confederation Cup was the fifth edition of the CAF Confederation Cup. Its schedule began with the preliminary round (home and away ties) in mid-February. The competition concluded on 22 November with CS Sfaxien winning the title.

== Qualifying rounds ==
All rounds have been drawn.

=== Preliminary round ===
1st legs played on 15–17 February 2008 and 2nd legs played on 29 February–2 March 2008.

Team 1	Agg.	Team 2	1st leg	2nd leg
US Masséda (Togo)	3–1	(Benin) UNB	2–0	1–1
Black Star (Liberia)	0–3	(Guinea) Satellite FC	0–0	0–3
AS Mangasport (Gabon)	5–0	(Niger) AS-FNIS	3–0	2–0
Ports Authority (The Gambia)	0–4	(Ivory Coast) ES Bingerville	0–1	0–3
AS Maniema Union (Democratic Republic of the Congo)	3–0	(Equatorial Guinea) Akonangui FC	3–0	0–0
Express FC (Uganda)	1–1 (5–4 p)	(Burundi) AS Inter Star	1–0	0–1
AS Adema (Madagascar)	1–2	(Tanzania) Young Africans FC	1–0	0–2
AS CotonTchad (Chad)	w/o^{1}	(Libya) Al Akhdar	—	—
Highlanders FC (Zimbabwe)	3–1	(Mozambique) Ferroviário de Nampula	3–0	0–1
Chipukizi (Zanzibar)	0–7	(Zambia) Green Buffaloes	0–5	0–2
Harrar Beer (Ethiopia)	2–2 (3–5 p)	(Rwanda) Rayon Sport	2–0	0–2
Anse Réunion (Seychelles)	2–1	(Mauritius) Petite Rivière	2–1	0–0
JS Talangaï (Republic of the Congo)	3–5	Mount Cameroon FC	2–1	1–4

^{1} Clubs from the Central African Republic, Chad, Kenya, Rwanda and Sierra Leone were disqualified for failure to fulfill their financial obligations.

=== First round ===
1st legs played on 21–23 March 2008 and 2nd legs played on 4–6 April 2008.

Team 1	Agg.	Team 2	1st leg	2nd leg
Issia Wazi FC (Ivory Coast)	3–4	(Togo) US Masséda	2–0	1–4
Rachad Bernoussi (Morocco)	3–3 (a)	(Tunisia) Espérance	3–1	0–2
Djoliba (Mali)	3–0	(Guinea) Satellite FC	2–0	1–0
Petro Atletico (Angola)	1–3	(Gabon) AS Mangasport	1–2	0–1
ASC Linguère (Senegal)	3–3 (5–3 p)	(Ivory Coast) ES Bingerville	3–0	0–3
CS Sfaxien (Tunisia)	2–1	(Algeria) JSM Béjaïa	1–0	1–1
Les Astres FC (Cameroon)	2–0	(Democratic Republic of the Congo) AS Maniema Union	2–0	0–0
AS Vita Club (Democratic Republic of the Congo)	0–0 (4–2 p)	(Uganda) Express FC	0–0	0–0
Al Akhdar (Libya)	2–1	(Tanzania) Young Africans FC	1–1	1–0
MC Alger (Algeria)	0–1	(Egypt) Haras El Hodood	0–0	0–1
Green Buffaloes FC (Zambia)	1–2	(Zimbabwe) Highlanders FC	1–1	0–1
Al-Merrikh (Sudan)	3–0	(Rwanda) Rayon Sport	3–0	0–0
Ajax Cape Town (South Africa)	5–1	(Seychelles) Anse Réunion	1–0	4–1
1º de Maio (Angola)	1–2	Mount Cameroon FC	0–2	1–0
Casa Sport (Senegal)	1–2	(Nigeria) Dolphins	0–0	1–2
Wikki Tourists (Nigeria)	3–6	(Ghana) Asante Kotoko	2–2	1–4

=== Second round ===
1st legs played on 25–27 April 2008 and 2nd legs played on 9–11 May 2008.

Team 1	Agg.	Team 2	1st leg	2nd leg
US Masséda (Togo)	2–6	(Tunisia) Espérance	1–0	1–6
Djoliba (Mali)	5–2	(Gabon) AS Mangasport	3–1	2–1
ASC Linguère (Senegal)	4–4 (a)	(Tunisia) CS Sfaxien	3–2	1–2
Les Astres FC (Cameroon)	1–1 (a)	(Democratic Republic of the Congo) AS Vita Club	0–0	1–1
Al Akhdar (Libya)	1–2	(Egypt) Haras El Hodood	1–1	0–1
Highlanders FC (Zimbabwe)	1–5	(Sudan) Al-Merrikh	0–2	1–3
Ajax Cape Town (South Africa)	5–6	Mount Cameroon FC	5–1	0–5
Dolphins (Nigeria)	3–4	(Ghana) Asante Kotoko	2–0	1–4^{1}

^{1} The match was abandoned at halftime with Asante Kotoko winning 1–0 due a storm that flooded the pitch. The match was replayed next day.

=== Play-off round ===
The 8 winners of the round of 16 play the losers of the round of 16 of the Champions League for 8 places in the group stage.
First leg played 11/12/13 July and second leg played 25/26/27 July

Team 1	Agg.	Team 2	1st leg	2nd leg
Etoile du Sahel (Tunisia)	2–0	(Tunisia) Espérance	2–0	0–0
Club Africain (Tunisia)	0–0 (5–3 p)	(Mali) Djoliba	0–0	0–0
Platinum Stars (South Africa)	2–4	(Tunisia) CS Sfaxien	2–2	0–2
JS Kabylie (Algeria)	2–1	(Cameroon) Les Astres FC	1–1	1–0
Mamelodi Sundowns (South Africa)	1–2	(Egypt) Haras El Hodood	1–0	0–2
Olympique Khouribga (Morocco)	2–2 (a)	(Sudan) Al-Merrikh	2–2	0–0
Interclube (Angola)	3–2	Mount Cameroon FC	2–1	1–1
Al Ittihad Tripolil (Libya)	3–4	(Ghana) Asante Kotoko	2–1	1–3

== Group stage ==
The group phase starts on the weekend of 15–17 August and concludes on the weekend of 17–19 October. There are no semi-finals; the group winners meet in a two-legged final.

Key to colours in group tables
Group winners advance to the final

=== Group A ===
Pos	Team	Pld	W	D	L	GF	GA	GD	Pts	Qualification	CSS	HEH	CA	INT
1	(Tunisia) CS Sfaxien	6	4	1	1	11	6	+5	13	Final	—	1–0	2–0	4–1
2	(Egypt) Haras El Hodood	6	3	1	2	10	6	+4	10		3–1	—	2–1	4–1
3	(Tunisia) Club Africain	6	2	2	2	7	6	+1	8		0–0	1–1	—	3–0
4	(Angola) Interclube	6	1	0	5	6	16	−10	3		2–3	1–0	1–2	—

Source: CAF
Rules for classification: Group stage tiebreakers

=== Group B ===
Pos	Team	Pld	W	D	L	GF	GA	GD	Pts	Qualification	ESS	ALM	JSK	ASK
1	(Tunisia) Etoile Sahel	6	3	1	2	8	6	+2	10	Final	—	2–1	2–0	2–0
2	(Sudan) Al-Merrikh	6	3	0	3	9	8	+1	9		2–0	—	3–1	2–1
3	(Algeria) JS Kabylie	6	3	0	3	8	9	−1	9		1–0	3–1	—	2–0
4	(Ghana) Asante Kotoko	6	2	1	3	7	9	−2	7		2–2	1–0	3–1	—

Source: CAF
Rules for classification: Group stage tiebreakers

== Knockout stage ==
=== Final ===
The final 2 legs will be played on 8 and 22 November.

8 November 2008
15:00 UTC+1

CS Sfaxien (Tunisia)	0 - 0	(Tunisia) Etoile Sahel
	Report

Stade Taïeb Mhiri, Sfax
Referee: Mohamed Benouza (Algeria)
22 November 2008
15:00 UTC+1

Etoile Sahel (Tunisia)	2 - 2	(Tunisia) CS Sfaxien
Opara 73'; Abdennour 79'		Apoko 2'; Nafti 69'

Stade Olympique de Sousse, Sousse
Referee: Eddy Maillet (Seychelles)

== Goalscorers ==
Leading goal scorers including group stage matches.

Player	Club	Goals
(Ghana) Eric Bekoe	(Ghana) Asante Kotoko	10
(Egypt) Ahmed Abdel-Ghani	(Egypt) Haras El Hodood	5
(Ghana) Agyeman Prempeh Opoku	(Tunisia) CS Sfaxien	4
(Nigeria) Emeka Opara	(Tunisia) Etoile Sahel	4
(Tunisia) Abdelkarim Nafti	(Tunisia) CS Sfaxien	4
(Ivory Coast) Blaise Kouassi	(Tunisia) CS Sfaxien	3
(Iraq) Alaa Abdul-Zahra	(Sudan) Al-Merrikh	3
(Sudan) Faisal Agab	(Sudan) Al-Merrikh	3
(Sudan) Abdelhamid Ammari	(Sudan) Al-Merrikh	3
(Sudan) Mugahid Mohamed	(Sudan) Al-Merrikh	3
(Sudan) Haytham Tambal	(Sudan) Al-Merrikh	3
