= Ayache Belaoued =

Algerian footballer (born 1984)

Personal information
- Full name: Ayache Belaoued
- Date of birth: January 5, 1984 (age 42)
- Place of birth: Oued El Alleug, Algeria
- Position: Midfielder

Team information
- Current team: MO Constantine

Senior career*
| Years | Team | Apps | (Gls) |
| 2004–2005 | WA Boufarik | - | (-) |
| 2005–2008 | USM Blida | - | (-) |
| 2008–2009 | JS Kabylie | - | (-) |
| 2009–2010 | MC Saïda | - | (-) |
| 2010–2011 | CA Bordj Bou Arreridj | 6 | (0) |
| 2011– | MO Constantine | 1 | (0) |

International career
| 2008 | Algeria A' | 0 | (0) |
- * Club domestic league appearances and goals

Ayache Belaoued (born January 5, 1984) is an Algerian footballer. He currently plays as a midfielder for MO Constantine in the Algerian Ligue Professionnelle 2.

== Biography ==
In December, 2007, Belaoued had a successful trial with the Portuguese side S.L. Benfica. However, still under contract with USM Blida, he was unable to join the team. He joined JS Kabylie in the summer of 2008 but left the club after just one season to sign with MC Saïda in the second division.

== International career ==
On April 5, 2008, Belaoued was called up by the Algerian A' National Team for a game against USM Blida on April 11.
