= Abdennour Chérif El-Ouazzani =

Algerian footballer (born 1986)

Personal information
- Full name: Si-Abdennour Chérif El-Ouazzani
- Date of birth: 18 March 1986 (age 40)
- Place of birth: Oran, Algeria
- Position: Midfielder

Team information
- Current team: CA Bordj Bou Arréridj

Senior career*
Years	Team	Apps	(Gls)
2006–2009	MC Oran	34	(2)
2009–2010	JS Kabylie	31	(0)
2011–	CA Bordj Bou Arréridj	1	(0)

International career^{‡}
2010–	Algeria A'	1	(0)
- * Club domestic league appearances and goals as of 00:00, 13 September 2011 (UTC) ‡ National team caps and goals as of 00:00, 13 September 2011 (UTC)

Si-Abdennour Chérif El-Ouazzani (born 18 March 1986) is an Algerian football player. He currently plays for CA Bordj Bou Arréridj in the Algerian Ligue Professionnelle 2.

== Playing career ==
=== MC Oran ===
Abdennour Chérif El-Ouazzani began his career as a youngster at MC Oran, where he was coached by his older brother, the former Algerian international Tahar Chérif El-Ouazzani, whom he names as his favourite player. He made his senior debut at the age of 18, playing a quarter of an hour as a substitute in a 1–0 win in the Algerian Cup against USM Alger. JS Kabylie, then Algerian First Division champions, attempted to sign Cherif El Ouazzani in the January 2009 transfer window, but his club refused to sell, considering the player to be a key part of their promotion drive. His performances during the 2008–09 season alongside Abdelmadjid Benatia in defensive midfield made a significant contribution to his club gaining promotion back to the first division.

=== JS Kabylie ===
With promotion achieved, Abdennour Chérif El-Ouazzani was free to leave MC Oran. He signed a two-year contract with JS Kabylie, 2008–09 First Division runners-up, for a total fee of 7.5 million DA (£63,000), of which 4.5 million DA (£38,000) was paid in cash. Despite having received several other offers, the player stated that JSK were a big club that you didn't say no to, who would give him the chance to win titles, to play in the CAF Champions League and give another dimension to his career. The player made his debut for JSK in the opening game of the season, playing the full 90 minutes of a 1–0 defeat against CA Bordj Bou Arreridj.

== Personal life ==
Abdennour Chérif El-Ouazzani has seven brothers and two sisters. In a 2009 interview, he said that he intended to become a physical trainer after he finished playing, and that in his spare time he enjoyed going fishing with his brothers.
