= Demba Barry =

Malian footballer

Personal information
- Full name: Demba Barry
- Date of birth: November 4, 1987 (age 39)
- Place of birth: Bamako, Mali
- Height: 6 ft 2 in (1.88 m)
- Position: Centre back

Team information
- Current team: ES Sétif
- Number: 20

Senior career*
| Years | Team | Apps | (Gls) |
| 2006–2007 | AS Real Bamako | 48 | (3) |
| 2007–2009 | JS Kabylie | 52 | (2) |
| 2009–2012 | Al-Hilal Omdurman | 60 | (6) |
| 2012– | ES Sétif | 18 | (3) |
- * Club domestic league appearances and goals as of April 11, 2009

Demba Barry (born November 4, 1987, in Bamako) is a Malian footballer. He currently plays as a defender for the Algerian Championnat National club ES Sétif. He scored his first goal for Al-Hilal in a match which Al-Hilal beat Al-Ahli, Wad Medani 2–1 and in the CAF Champions League he scored against Al-Merreikh SC in a match which finished 3–1. He scored two goals against El-Merriekh in the last six meetings between them

Barry was an important part of JS Kabylie's defense, playing in 2008 CAF Confederation Cup group stage.

== Club career ==
- 2006-2007 AS Real Bamako (Mali)
- 2007-2009 JS Kabylie (Algeria)
- 2009–2012 Al-Hilal Omdurman (Sudan)
- 2012–Present ES Sétif (Algeria)

== Honours ==
- Won the Algerian League once with JS Kabylie in 2008
- Won the Sudan Premier League twice with Al-Hilal in 2009 and 2010
