= Tayeb Berramla =

Algerian footballer (born 1985)

Personal information
- Full name: Tayeb Berramla
- Date of birth: 6 January 1985 (age 41)
- Place of birth: Oran, Algeria
- Height: 1.84 m (6 ft 0 in)
- Position: Midfielder

Team information
- Current team: ASM Oran
- Number: 5

Youth career
- ASM Oran

Senior career*
Years	Team	Apps	(Gls)
2001–2007	ASM Oran	-	(-)
2007–2009	JS Kabylie	-	(-)
2009–2010	MC Oran	32	(3)
2010–2011	WA Tlemcen	13	(1)
2011–2012	MC Alger	17	(0)
2012	MC Saïda	9	(0)
2012–2013	ASM Oran	-	(-)
2013–2016	RC Relizane	-	(-)
2016	MC Oran	-	(-)
2017–2018	JSM Skikda	-	(-)
2018–	ASM Oran	-	(-)

International career
2005–2008	Algeria U23	-	(-)
- * Club domestic league appearances and goals as of 22:20, 16 January 2017 (UTC)

Tayeb Berramla (Arabic: طيب بررملة; born 6 January 1985) is an Algerian footballer. He currently plays as a midfielder for ASM Oran in the Algerian Ligue Professionnelle 2.

== Club career ==
On 6 January 2016 Berramla signed a contract with MC Oran, joining them on a transfer from RC Relizane.

== Honours ==
- Won the Algerian League once with JS Kabylie in 2008
- Chosen as the Algerian Young Player of the Year in 2007 by DZFoot
