= Nabil Hamouda =

Algerian footballer (born 1983)

Nabil Hamouda (born 4 January 1983 in Lakhdaria) is an Algerian footballer.

== Club career ==
- 2001–2005 RC Kouba
- 2005–2007 Paradou AC
- 2007–2009. JS Kabylie

== Honours ==
- Won the Algerian League once with JS Kabylie in 2008
