= Essaïd Belkalem =

Algerian footballer (born 1989)

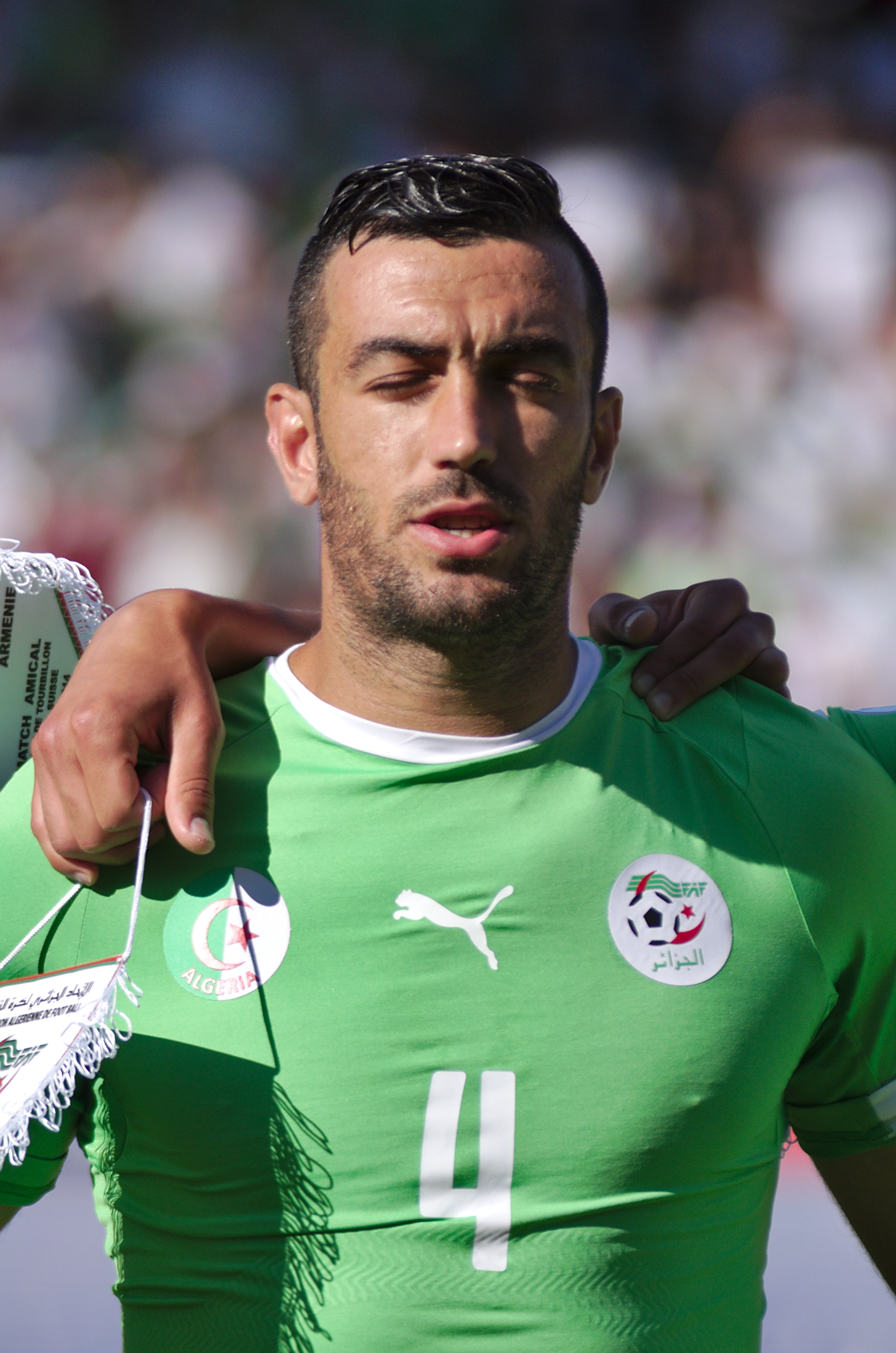
- Belkalem with Algeria in 2014

Personal information
- Full name: Essaïd Belkalem
- Date of birth: 1 January 1989 (age 37)
- Place of birth: Mekla, Algeria
- Height: 1.90 m (6 ft 3 in)
- Position: Defender

Youth career
- 2006–2008: JS Kabylie

Senior career*
Years	Team	Apps	(Gls)
2008–2013	JS Kabylie	83	(4)
2013–2014	Granada	0	(0)
2013–2014	→ Watford (loan)	8	(0)
2014–2016	Watford	0	(0)
2014–2015	→ Trabzonspor (loan)	16	(2)
2016–2017	Orléans	27	(1)
2018	JS Kabylie	9	(0)

International career^{‡}
2007–2008	Algeria U20	4	(0)
2009–2010	Algeria U23	4	(1)
2010	Algeria A'	2	(2)
2012-2018	Algeria	19	(1)
- * Club domestic league appearances and goals as of 4 May 2018 ‡ National team caps and goals as of 2 April 2017

Essaïd Belkalem (Arabic: سعيد بلكالم; born 1 January 1989) is an Algerian former professional footballer who played as a defender.

== Club career ==
In 2008, Belkalem was promoted to the JS Kabylie senior team from the club's junior ranks.

In the 2009–2010 season, Belkalem made 20 appearances, scoring one goal.

On 18 July 2010, Belkalem scored JS Kabylie's only goal in the win over Egyptian club Ismaily in the group stage of the 2010 CAF Champions League with a header in the 75th minute.

In February 2013, with his contract expiring in June, Belkalem said that he would be leaving JS Kabylie at the end of the season to join a European club.

=== Granada ===
In June 2013, with his contract with JS Kabylie expired, it was announced that Belkalem had signed a five-year contract with Spanish La Liga club Granada, joining them on a free transfer.

=== Watford ===
Belkalem signed for Championship club Watford on a season-long loan on 12 August 2013. He wore the number 5 shirt. He made his debut for Watford in their 2–0 League Cup victory over Bournemouth on 28 August 2013, playing the full 90 minutes. His league debut came in a 1–1 draw at home to Charlton Athletic on 14 September 2013.

Watford exercised the right to make Belkalem's move a permanent one following the expiry of his loan, joining on an undisclosed deal in June 2014.

On 10 August 2016, Belkalem was released from his contract at Watford, after playing 10 times in three years.

=== Trabzonspor (loan) ===
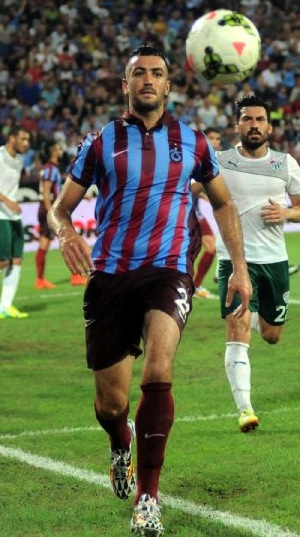
Belkalem with Trabzonspor in 2014

After moving to Watford permanently in the summer of 2014, Belkalem made the move to Turkish Süper Lig side Trabzonspor on a season-long loan deal linking up with former Algeria coach Vahid Halilhodžić. Having made 16 appearances in the league, eight in the Europa League, scoring three goals, Belkalem finalised his loan spell at Trabzonspor on 2 June 2015.

=== JS Kabylie ===
On 15 January 2018, after six months without a contract, Belkalem returned to his former club JS Kabylie.

== International career ==
In 2007, Belkalem was called up to the Algerian U20 national team for the first edition of the Mediterranean Trophy held in Sicily, Italy. In 2008, he started in a 2009 African Youth Championship qualifier against Mauritania.

In August 2009, Belkalem received his first call-up to the Algeria Under-23 national team for a week-long training camp in Algiers.

In 2010, he was called up to the Algeria A' national team for a qualifier against Libya.

On 12 May 2012, Belkalem was called up for the first time to the Algeria national team for the 2014 FIFA World Cup qualifiers against Mali and Rwanda, and the return leg of the 2013 Africa Cup of Nations qualifier against Gambia. On 9 September, he made his debut for the team as a starter in the first leg of the 2013 Africa Cup of Nations second round qualifier against Libya. Belkalem played the entire match as Algeria went on to win 1–0.

On 31 May 2014, Belkalem played an International Friendly, he scored his first international goal, he scored the first goal of the match between his team Algeria against Armenia and Algeria won the match by the score of 3–1.

Belkalem was later included in Algeria's squad for the 2014 FIFA World Cup, helping them to the Round of 16 for the first time.

== Honours ==
In 2009, Belkalem was chosen as the third best young talent in the Algerian Championnat National behind Abderahmane Hachoud and Youcef Ghazali in a vote conducted by DZFoot.
