= Junior Osagie =

Nigerian footballer

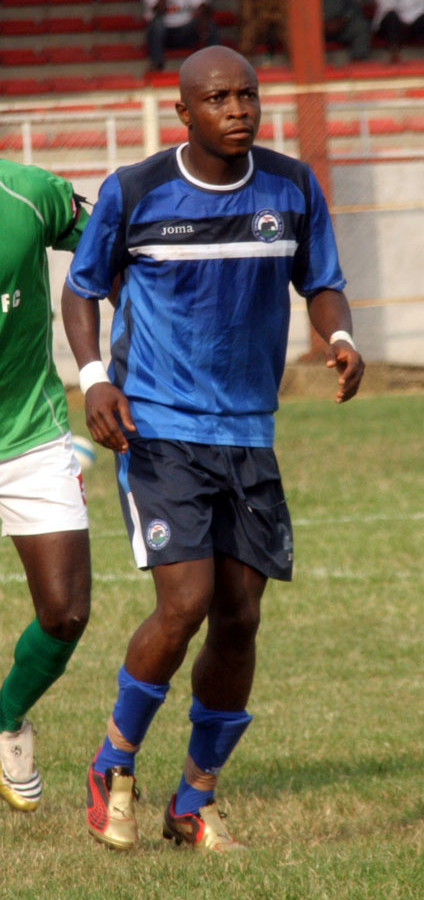

Personal information
- Full name: Junior Efueko Osagie
- Date of birth: January 15, 1985 (age 41)
- Place of birth: Edo State, Nigeria
- Height: 1.81 m (5 ft 11 in)
- Positions: Striker; attacking midfielder

Team information
- Current team: Hapoel Jerusalem
- Number: 55

Senior career*
Years	Team	Apps	(Gls)
2001 – 2005	Bendel Insurance F.C.	65	(19)
2005 – 2006	Dolphin FC	28	(16)
2006 – 2007	Enugu Rangers	31	(13)
2007 – 2008	Enyimba F.C.	29	(16)
2008 – 2009	Club Africain	41	(15)
2009 – 2010	Enyimba F.C.		
2012 – 2014	Warri Wolves F.C.		
2014 –	Hapoel Jerusalem	0	(0)

International career
?	Nigeria	4	(0)
- * Club domestic league appearances and goals as of December 31, 2006

Junior Efueko Osagie (born January 15, 1985, in Edo State) is a Nigerian football player currently with Hapoel Jerusalem.

== Career ==
Osagie started his career in his home town club, Insurance FC, and moved to Dolphin FC, Port Harcourt in 2005. After one season with Dolphin FC, his goal scoring exploits caught the attention of Rangers Intl. FC, Enugu, where he was transferred in a big money move. Junior excelled in Rangers and was often voted their best player in the season he spent there. His exploits in Enugu, led to another big money move to Enyimba FC of Aba, who were then the best club in the country. He helped Enyimba to win the CAF Champions league. During this time, his skills and goal scoring feat led to a transfer to Club Africain in Tunisia. After two seasons in Tunisia, Enyimba once again swooped for him. . November 2012 his comeback with Nigeria Premier League side NPA Warri Wolves.

=== International ===
Osagie won many caps as a junior international and has 4 caps with the senior national team.
