= Idrissa Coulibaly =

Malian footballer (born 1987)

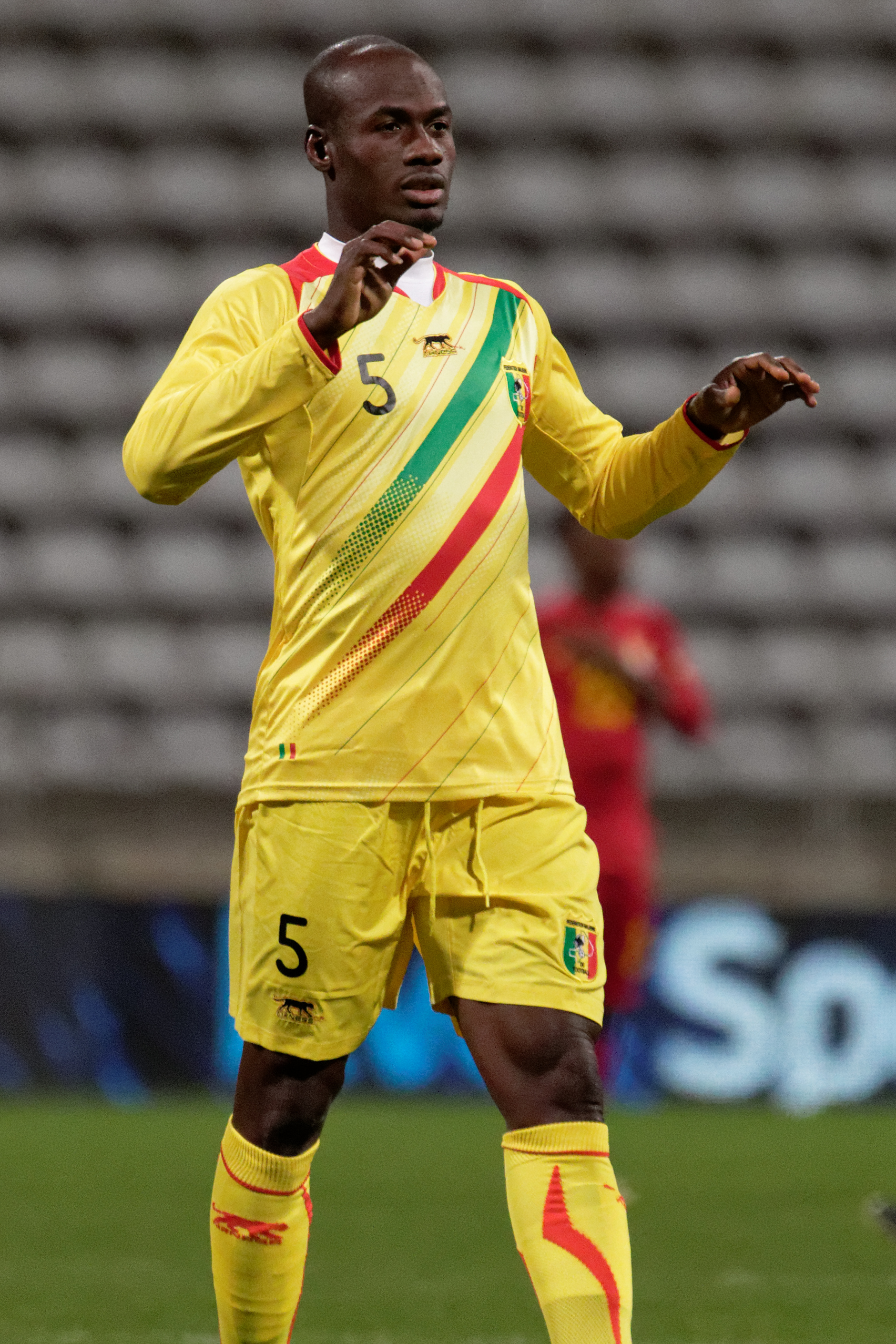
- Coulibaly with Mali in 2015

Personal information
- Full name: Idrissa Coulibaly
- Date of birth: 19 December 1987 (age 38)
- Place of birth: Bamako, Mali
- Height: 1.85 m (6 ft 1 in)
- Position: Defender

Youth career
- 1998–2006: Centre Salif Keita

Senior career*
Years	Team	Apps	(Gls)
2006–2008	JS Centre Salif Keita		
2008–2010	JS Kabylie	58	(3)
2011	Al-Ahly (Tripoli)	0	(0)
2011–2013	Espérance de Tunis	14	(1)
2012–2013	→ Lekhwiya (loan)	5	(0)
2013–2015	Raja Casablanca	13	(0)
2014–2015	→ Hassania Agadir (loan)	19	(1)
2015–2016	Arouca	0	(0)
2016–2018	Ben Guerdane	38	(1)
2018–2019	Al-Nahda		

International career
2007–	Mali	13	(0)
Medal record
Men's football
Representing Mali
Africa Cup of Nations
Third place	2012 Eguatorial Guinea-Gabon
Third place	2013 South Africa
- * Club domestic league appearances and goals

Idrissa Coulibaly (born 19 December 1987) is a Malian former professional footballer who played as a defender.

== Club career ==
Born in Bamako, Mali, Coulibaly began his career at the age of 10 in the junior ranks of JS Centre Salif Keita. In 2006, while many of his teammates were promoted to the first team, Coulibaly was not offered the chance. He decided to quit the club and began training with another local club. However, after 15 days, JS Centre Salif Keita convinced him to return and he was promoted shortly after that to the first team.

In winter of 2008, Coulibaly received offers from two local clubs, Djoliba AC and Real Bamako, as well as from Algerian club JS Kabylie. French club FC Nantes also wanted to take the player on trial.

=== JS Kabylie ===
On 7 January 2008, it was announced that Coulibaly would join JS Kabylie on a three-year contract. In his first season with the club, Coulibaly helped the club win the Algerian Championnat National.

On 14 December 2010, Coulibaly was chosen as the Best Foreign Player in the Algerian league in 2010.

On 22 December 2010, it was announced that Coulibaly signed a one-and-a-half-year contract with Libyan club Al-Ahly Tripoli, joining them on a free transfer. However, in an interview four days later, Coulibaly said he simply signed a pre-contract with the club and was still undecided with regards to his future destination. He is engaged with Tunisian team Club Africain after agreement between Al ahly Tripoly until June 2014.

=== Espérance ===
On 6 August 2011, Coulibaly joined Tunisian club Espérance de Tunis.

=== Lekhwiya ===
He joined French Ligue 2 side FC Istres in September 2012, but was not signed due to an administrative problem. Instead, he went on a five-month loan to Qatari side Lekhwiya as a replacement for Madjid Bougherra.

=== Raja Casablanca ===
In June 2013, Coulibaly returned to Africa for Raja Casablanca. He signed a two-year deal with the Moroccan club. Coulibaly was loaned to Hassania Agadir for the 2014–2015 season.

=== Arouca ===
On 7 July 2015, he signed a one-year deal with Portuguese club Arouca.

== International career ==
On 17 June 2007, Coulibaly made his debut for the Mali national team in a 6–0 win against Sierra Leone in a 2008 African Cup of Nations qualifier.

He was also capped at the Under-23 level for Mali.

== Honours ==
JS Kabylie

- Algerian League: 2008
