= Mohamed Ali Nafkha =

Tunisian footballer

Personal information
- Date of birth: 25 January 1986 (age 40)
- Place of birth: Sousse, Tunisia
- Height: 1.81 m (5 ft 11 in)
- Position: Defensive midfielder

Senior career*
| Years | Team | Apps | (Gls) |
| 2005–2010 | Étoile du Sahel | | |
| 2011–2013 | FC Zürich | 0 | (0) |
| 2011–2012 | → Étoile du Sahel (loan) | | |
| 2013–2014 | Étoile du Sahel | 3 | (0) |
| 2014–2020 | ES Hammam-Sousse | | |

International career
| 2007–2010 | Tunisia | 11 | (0) |

Managerial career
- 2020–2021: Étoile du Sahel (assistant)
- * Club domestic league appearances and goals

Mohamed Ali Nafkha (born 25 January 1986 in Sousse) is a Tunisian former professional footballer who played as a defensive midfielder.

Nafkha scored twice in Étoile du Sahel's CAF Confederation Cup 2006 group stage match against Espérance to help seal their place in the final.

On 12 December 2010, he signed a four-year contract with Swiss Super League club FC Zurich.

In 2020 he retired and became assistant manager of Étoile du Sahel.

On January 30th, 2026, The Executive Committee of Étoile Sportive du Sahel has announced the appointment of coach Mohamed Ali Nafkha as head of the technical staff of the club’s senior football team.
