= Tayeb Maroci =

Algerian footballer (born 1985)

Personal information
- Date of birth: 1 June 1985 (age 41)
- Place of birth: Maghnia
- Position: Midfielder

Team information
- Current team: NC Magra
- Number: 13

Youth career
- IRB Maghnia

Senior career*
Years	Team	Apps	(Gls)
2004–2005	IRB Maghnia	/	(/)
2005–2008	USM Blida	71	(0)
2008–2010	JS Kabylie	47	(2)
2010–2012	JSM Béjaïa	51	(1)
2012–2014	JS Kabylie	40	(2)
2014–2016	USM Blida	42	(2)
2016–2019	DRB Tadjenanet	54	(1)
2019–	NC Magra		
- * Club domestic league appearances and goals as of 25 July 2019

Tayeb Maroci (born June 1, 1985) is an Algerian footballer. He currently plays as a midfielder for NC Magra in the Algerian Ligue Professionnelle 1.

He has been capped at the Under-23 level and by the Algeria A' National Team in a friendly against USM Blida.
