= Ahmed Abdel-Ghani =

Egyptian footballer (born 1981)

Personal information
- Full name: Ahmed Said Ahmed Hossam Abdel-Ghani
- Date of birth: 1 December 1981 (age 44)
- Place of birth: El-Minya, Egypt
- Height: 1.85 m (6 ft 1 in)
- Position: Striker

Senior career*
Years	Team	Apps	(Gls)
1998–2004	El Minya SC		
2002–2003	Baladeyet El Mahalla SC (loan)		
2004–2013	Haras El Hodood		
2013–2013	Sur		
2013–2014	Misr Lel Makkasa		

International career
2006–2009	Egypt	5	(0)
- * Club domestic league appearances and goals

Ahmed Abdel-Ghani (born 1 December 1981) is an Egyptian former professional footballer who played as a forward.
