= Nassim Oussalah =

Algerian footballer (born 1981)

Personal information
- Full name: Nassim Oussalah
- Date of birth: 8 October 1981 (age 45)
- Place of birth: Béjaïa, Algeria
- Height: 1.70 m (5 ft 7 in)
- Positions: Left-back; left winger

Senior career*
Years	Team	Apps	(Gls)
2004–2005	MO Béjaïa	-	(-)
2005–2011	JS Kabylie	142	(8)
2011–2012	NA Hussein Dey	2	(0)
2012	CA Batna	9	(0)
2012–2016	MC El Eulma	103	(0)
2016–2018	JSM Skikda	51	(0)
- * Club domestic league appearances and goals

Nassim Oussalah (born 8 October 1981) is an Algerian former footballer who played primarily as a left-back.

== Honours ==
- Won the Algerian League twice with JS Kabylie in 2006 and 2008
- Won the Algerian Cup once with JS Kabylie in 2011
