= Eric Bekoe =

Ghanaian footballer (born 1986)

Personal information
- Full name: Eric Kwabena Bekoe
- Date of birth: 10 December 1986 (age 39)
- Place of birth: Accra, Ghana
- Height: 1.80 m (5 ft 11 in)
- Position: Forward

Youth career
- S.C. Adelaide

Senior career*
Years	Team	Apps	(Gls)
2004–2006	Liberty Professionals		
2006–2007	Heart of Lions	24	(20)
2007–2008	Asante Kotoko	23	(17)
2009–2012	Petrojet	80	(65)
2012–2014	Berekum Chelsea	42	(32)
2013–2015	Accra Great Olympics		
2014–2015	→ Kénitra (loan)	1	(0)
2016	Sekondi Hasaacas	22	(8)
2016–2018	Kafr El Sheikh		
2018	AFC Leopards		

International career
2007	Ghana U23	3	(1)
2008	Ghana	5	(0)
- * Club domestic league appearances and goals

Eric Bekoe (born 10 December 1986) is a Ghanaian football striker. He played for AFC Leopards in the Kenyan football league.

== Club career ==
In the season 2007/08, with a total 17 goals in 23 matches he became the "Goal King" (top scorer) of the One Touch Premier League and League Champion with Kotoko. He also won the Presidents Cup with them in the same year.

On 6 December 2008 Bekoe signed a four and half years contract with Egypt Premier League club Petrojet. He was set to join Egypt giants Zamalek, but instead Petrojet made a very quick move and the player welcomed it. He became the third non-Egyptian player for the club.

His goal tally so far stands at 22 goals in 28 games in all competitions.

On 18 September 2012, Bekoe joined Berekum Chelsea on a two-year contract.

== International career ==
He made his debut for Ghana by coming off the bench in a friendly match against Mexico on 26 March 2008, and played in the first World Cup Qualification games of his country against Gabon and Libya. Bekoe has represented Ghana at youth level, a.o. at the 2007 Toulon Tournament.
