= Adlène Bensaïd =

Algerian footballer (born 1981)

Personal information
- Full name: Adlène Bensaïd
- Date of birth: 3 November 1981 (age 44)
- Place of birth: Annaba, Algeria
- Height: 1.80 m (5 ft 11 in)
- Position: Forward

Team information
- Current team: NA Hussein Dey

Senior career*
Years	Team	Apps	(Gls)
1998–1999	IRB El Hadjar	-	(-)
1999–2006	USM Annaba	97	(23)
2006	USM Alger	13	(3)
2007	USM Blida	12	(6)
2007–2009	JS Kabylie	39	(16)
2009–2010	USM Annaba	25	(7)
2010–2011	CA Bordj Bou Arreridj	18	(3)
2011–	NA Hussein Dey	0	(0)

International career^{‡}
2001–2004	Algeria U23	8	(5)
2003–2004	Algeria	4	(0)
- * Club domestic league appearances and goals as of 00:00, 9 August 2011 (UTC) ‡ National team caps and goals as of 00:00, April 16, 2012 (UTC)

Adlène Bensaïd (born 3 November 1981) is an Algerian football player who is currently playing for Algiers football club NA Hussein Dey in the Algerian Ligue Professionnelle 1.

== Club career ==
On August 13, 2011, Bensaïd signed a two-year contract with NA Hussein Dey.

== National team statistics ==
Algeria national team
Year	Apps	Goals
2003	3	0
2004	1	0
Total	4	0

== Honours ==
- Won the Algerian League once with JS Kabylie in 2008
