= 1 November 1954 Stadium (Tizi Ouzou) =

Stadium in Algeria

Coordinates: 36°42′25″N 4°03′22″E

1 November 1954 Stadium Annar n 1 unbir 1954
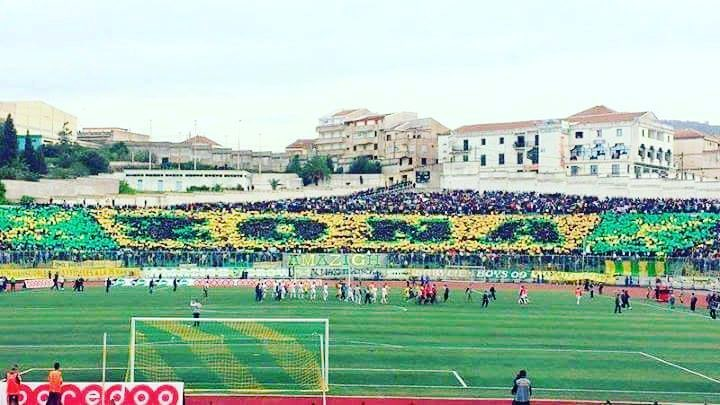
- Interactive map of 1 November 1954 Stadium; Annar n 1 unbir 1954
- Full name: 1 November 1954 Stadium
- Location: Tizi Ouzou, Algeria
- Capacity: 21,240
- Surface: Artificial turf

Construction
- Opened: 12 March 1978
- Renovated: 2007

Tenants
- JS Kabylie (Youth and women)

The 1 November 1954 Stadium (Arabic: ملعب أول نوفمبر 1954, Kabyle: Annar n 1 unbir 1954, French: Stade du 1er Novembre 1954) is a multi-use stadium in Tizi Ouzou, Kabylia, Algeria. It is used mostly for football matches and was the home ground of JS Kabylie from 1978 to 2024. The stadium holds 21,240 people.

The stadium takes its name from the date of the outbreak of the Algerian War.

In 2000, footballer Hocine Gasmi died on the field after a head contact.

In 2014 following the death of footballer Albert Ebossé Bodjongo, the Algerian Football Federation suspended all football indefinitely and ordered the closure of the stadium.

== History ==
=== Construction ===
After the JS Kabylie team began using the "Ramadan Oukil Stadium," which had a capacity of only 5,000 seats, starting in 1946 during the French occupation of Algeria, it became necessary, after Algeria's independence in 1962, to construct a larger football stadium in the city of Tizi Ouzou to host football matches in the country.

The team continued to use the "Ramadan Oukil Stadium" until 1978, when the construction of the November 1, 1954 Stadium in Tizi Ouzou was completed and inaugurated on March 12, 1978.

Occasionally, the JS Kabylie team would relocate to the Djilali Bounâama Stadium in the city of Boumerdes, located 40 kilometers west of Tizi Ouzou, to conduct its training sessions and matches during periods of penalties or when the November 1, 1954 Stadium in Tizi Ouzou was closed for maintenance and renovations.

=== Renovation ===
The stadium underwent a renovation project in 2007, during which its pitch was resurfaced with fourth-generation artificial turf. In parallel, two of the players' changing rooms were refurbished.

=== Etymology ===
The stadium was named "November 1, 1954" in 1978, in commemoration of the November 1, 1954, Declaration, which marked the outbreak of the Algerian War of Independence.

During the period between November 1, 1954, and July 5, 1962, the Kabylie region was part of the "Third Historical Wilaya" of Algeria, which was one of the revolutionary zones. It was led by figures such as Krim Belkacem, Saïd Mohammedi, Colonel Amirouche, Abdel Rahmane Mira, and finally, Mohand Oulhadj.

== Utilities ==
=== Soccer Stadium ===
The main pitch of the November 1, 1954 Stadium in Tizi Ouzou meets the specifications and standards of the Fédération Internationale de Football Association (FIFA). The Directorate of Youth and Sports in Tizi Ouzou, along with the Multi-Sports Complex Office in the province, provided the stadium with fifth-generation artificial turf, which has covered the pitch since 2014, similar to the Ramadan Oukil Stadium. Before 2014, the pitch was covered with Tartan Turf (tm), a material that posed a risk to football players.

The Tartan was replaced by fifth-generation artificial turf, which ensures the protection of players and enhances their technical and tactical performance. The stadium's spectator stands are divided into three sections: the covered grandstand, the large uncovered stands, and the small uncovered stands.

=== Handball Stadium ===
Handball Stadium is located within the sports complex that includes the November 1, 1954 Stadium in Tizi Ouzou.

In 2014, work began on the construction of a covered hall dedicated to handball, situated on the site of the existing handball court.

=== Basketball Stadium ===
Volleyball Stadium is located within the sports complex that includes the November 1, 1954 Stadium in Tizi Ouzou.

In 2014, construction began on a covered hall dedicated to volleyball, situated on the site of the existing volleyball court.

=== Weight training hall ===
The sports complex benefits from the presence of a weight training and bodybuilding hall located next to two of the players' changing rooms.

=== The pool ===
The sports complex features a 25-meter swimming pool designed to accommodate swimmers.

=== Cafeteria ===
The sports complex includes a cafeteria that sells food and drinks to athletes, spectators, and supporters.

== Gallery ==
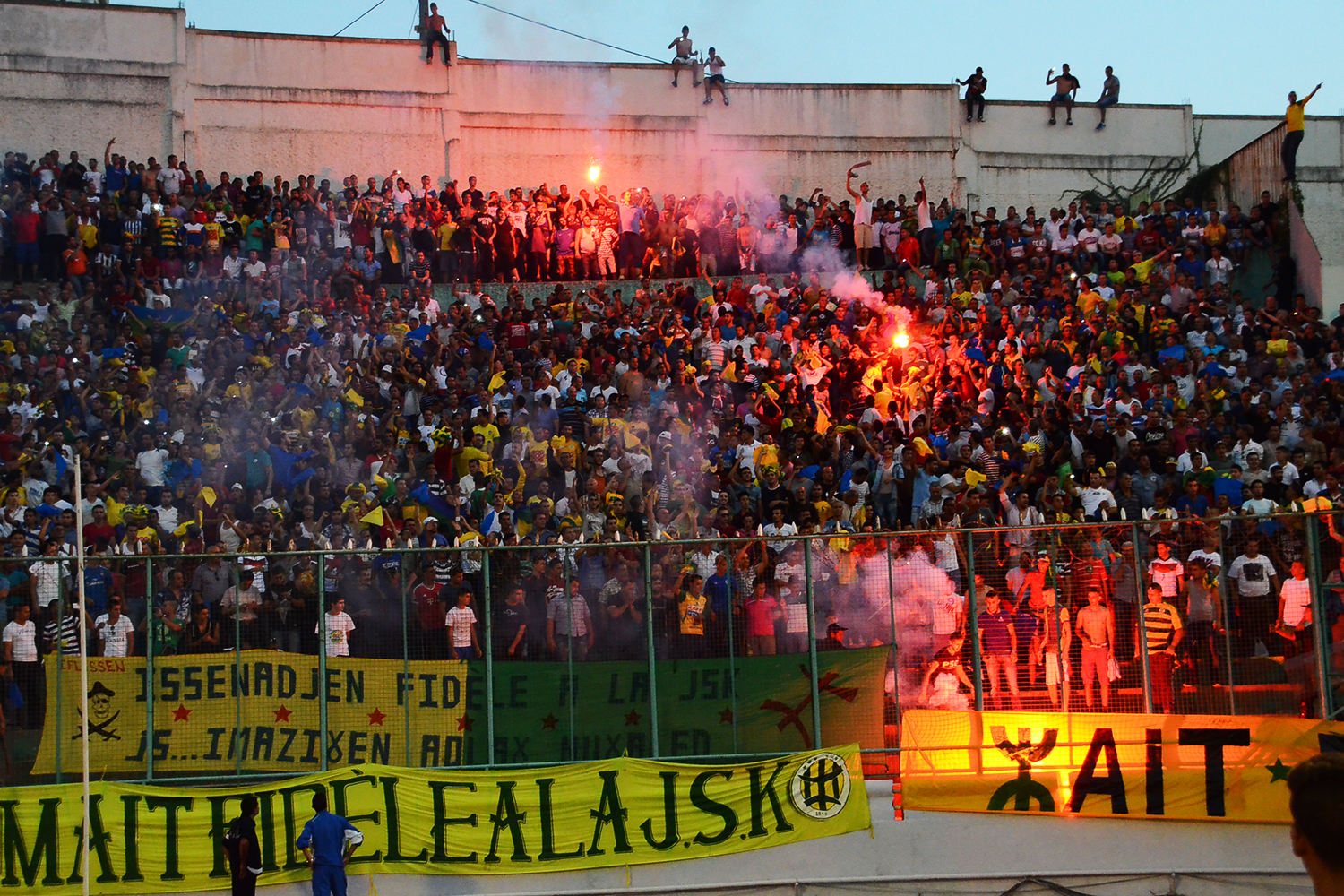
Stade Bayan November 1, 1954 in Tizi Ouzou

== See also ==
- Sport in Algeria
- Algerian Football Federation
- Algerian Ligue Professionnelle 1
- JS Kabylie
- List of football stadiums in Algeria
