= List of CAF club competition winning coaches =

Sports recognition of excellence

The following is a list of CAF club competition winning coaches that includes winning coaches over the years in the different competitions (or Cups) held by CAF. The Confederation of African Football (CAF) is the governing body for football leagues across Africa, in which African National football teams take part. It governs prize awards, as well as other administrative tasks.

== CAF Champions League ==
By year

Year	Club	Winning Coach (nationality)
1965	(Cameroon) Oryx Douala (1)	(Cameroon) Samuel Missipo (1)
1966	(Ivory Coast) Stade Abidjan (1)	(Ivory Coast) Luc Olivier (1)
1967	(Democratic Republic of the Congo) TP Mazembe (1)	(Democratic Republic of the Congo) Célestin Tambwe Laye (1)
1968	(Democratic Republic of the Congo) TP Mazembe (2)	(Democratic Republic of the Congo) Célestin Tambwe Laye (2)
1969	(Egypt) Ismaily SC (1)	(Egypt) Ali Osman (1)
1970	(Ghana) Asante Kotoko (1)	(Ghana) Edward Aggrey-Fynn (1)
1971	(Cameroon) Canon Yaoundé (1)	(Germany) Peter Schnittger (1)
1972	(Guinea) Hafia Conakry (1)	(Hungary) László Budai (1)
1973	(Democratic Republic of the Congo) AS Vita Club (1)	(Democratic Republic of the Congo) Kalambaye Ngoie (1)
1974	(Republic of the Congo) CARA Brazzaville (1)	(Romania) Cicerone Manolache (1)
1975	(Guinea) Hafia Conakry (2)	(Romania) Petre Moldoveanu (1) (Guinea) Boubacar Fofana (1)
1976	(Algeria) MC Algiers (1)	(Algeria) Hamid Zouba (1)
1977	(Guinea) Hafia Conakry (3)	(Guinea) Nabi Camara (1) (Guinea) Boubacar Fofana (2)
1978	(Cameroon) Canon Yaoundé (2)	(Socialist Federal Republic of Yugoslavia) Ivan Ridanović (1)
1979	(Cameroon) Union Douala (1)	(Cameroon) Théophile Abong (1)
1980	(Cameroon) Canon Yaoundé (3)	(Socialist Federal Republic of Yugoslavia) Branko Žutić (1)
1981	(Algeria) JE Tizi-Ouzou (1)	(Poland) Stefan Żywotko (1) (Algeria) Mahieddine Khalef (1)
1982	(Egypt) Al-Ahly (1)	(Egypt) Mahmoud El-Gohary (1)
1983	(Ghana) Asante Kotoko (2)	(Ghana) Ibrahim Sunday (1)
1984	(Egypt) Zamalek SC (1)	(Egypt) Mahmoud Abou-Regaila (1)
1985	(Morocco) FAR Rabat (1)	(Brazil) José Faria (1)
1986	(Egypt) Zamalek SC (2)	(England) Richie Barker (1)
1987	(Egypt) Al-Ahly (2)	(Egypt) Anwar Salama (1)
1988	(Algeria) ES Setif (1)	(Algeria) Mokhtar Aribi (1)
1989	(Morocco) Raja CA (1)	(Algeria) Rabah Saâdane (1)
1990	(Algeria) JS Kabylie (2)	(Poland) Stefan Żywotko (2) (Algeria) Ali Fergani (1)
1991	(Tunisia) Club Africain (1)	(Romania) Ilie Balaci (1)
1992	(Morocco) Wydad AC (1)	(Ukraine) Yuriy Sevastyanenko (1)
1993	(Egypt) Zamalek SC (3)	(Egypt) Mahmoud El-Gohary (2)
1994	(Tunisia) Espérance de Tunis (1)	(Tunisia) Faouzi Benzarti (1)
1995	(South Africa) Orlando Pirates (1)	(Zambia) Ronald Mkhandawire (1)
1996	(Egypt) Zamalek SC (4)	(Germany) Werner Olk (1)
1997	(Morocco) Raja Casablanca (2)	(Bosnia and Herzegovina) Vahid Halilhodžić (1)
1998	(Ivory Coast) ASEC Mimosas (1)	(Argentina) Oscar Fulloné (1)
1999	(Morocco) Raja CA (3)	(Argentina) Oscar Fulloné (2)
2000	(Ghana) Hearts of Oak (1)	(Ghana) Cecil Jones Attuquayefio (1)
2001	(Egypt) Al Ahly (3)	(Portugal) Manuel José (1)
2002	(Egypt) Zamalek (5)	(Brazil) Cabralzinho (1)
2003	(Nigeria) Enyimba FC (1)	(Nigeria) Kadiri Ikhana (1)
2004	(Nigeria) Enyimba FC (2)	(Nigeria) Okey Emordi (1)
2005	(Egypt) Al Ahly (4)	(Portugal) Manuel José (2)
2006	(Egypt) Al Ahly (5)	(Portugal) Manuel José (3)
2007	(Tunisia) Étoile du Sahel (1)	(France) Bertrand Marchand (1)
2008	(Egypt) Al Ahly (6)	(Portugal) Manuel José (4)
2009	(Democratic Republic of the Congo) TP Mazembe (3)	(France) Diego Garzitto (1)
2010	(Democratic Republic of the Congo) TP Mazembe (4)	(Senegal) Lamine N'Diaye (1)
2011	(Tunisia) Espérance de Tunis (2)	(Tunisia) Nabil Maâloul (1)
2012	(Egypt) Al Ahly (7)	(Egypt) Hossam El Badry (1)
2013	(Egypt) Al Ahly (8)	(Egypt) Mohamed Youssef (1)
2014	(Algeria) ES Setif (2)	(Algeria) Kheïreddine Madoui (1)
2015	(Democratic Republic of the Congo) TP Mazembe (5)	(France) Patrice Carteron (1)
2016	(South Africa) Mamelodi Sundowns (1)	(South Africa) Pitso Mosimane (1)
2017	(Morocco) Wydad AC (2)	(Morocco) Hussein Ammouta (1)
2018	(Tunisia) Espérance de Tunis (3)	(Tunisia) Mouin Chaâbani (1)
2018–19	(Tunisia) Espérance de Tunis (4)	(Tunisia) Mouin Chaâbani (2)
2019–20	(Egypt) Al Ahly (9)	(South Africa) Pitso Mosimane (2)
2020–21	(Egypt) Al Ahly (10)	(South Africa) Pitso Mosimane (3)
2021–22	(Morocco) Wydad AC (3)	(Morocco) Walid Regragui (1)
2022–23	(Egypt) Al Ahly (11)	(Switzerland) Marcel Koller (1)
2023–24	(Egypt) Al Ahly (12)	(Switzerland) Marcel Koller (2)
2024–25	(Egypt) Pyramids (1)	(Croatia) Krunoslav Jurčić (1)
2025–26	(South Africa) Mamelodi Sundowns (2)	(Portugal) Miguel Cardoso (1)

=== Multiple winners ===
#	Name	Nat	Titles	Years	Teams
1	Manuel José	Portugal	4	2001, 2005, 2006, 2008	(Egypt) Al-Ahly
2	Pitso Mosimane	South Africa	3	2016, 2020, 2021	(South Africa) Mamelodi Sundowns (Egypt) Al Ahly
3	Marcel Koller	Switzerland	2	2023, 2024	(Egypt) Al Ahly
3	Mouin Chaâbani	Tunisia	2	2018, 2019	(Tunisia) Espérance de Tunis
3	Célestin Tambwe Laye	DR Congo	2	1966, 1967	(Democratic Republic of the Congo) TP Mazembe
3	Oscar Fulloné	Argentina	2	1998, 1999	(Ivory Coast) ASEC Mimosas (Morocco) Raja Casablanca
3	Mahmoud El-Gohary	Egypt	2	1982, 1993	(Egypt) Al Ahly SC (Egypt) Zamalek SC
3	Boubacar Fofana	Guinea	2	1975, 1977	(Guinea) Hafia Conakry
3	Stefan Żywotko	Poland	2	1981, 1990	(Algeria) JS Kabylie

=== By nationality ===
#	Country	Titles
1	Egypt	7
2	Algeria	6
3	Portugal	rowspan=25
3	Tunisia	
5	DR Congo	3
5	Guinea	3
5	Romania	3
5	Ghana	3
5	France	3
5	South Africa	3
11	Cameroon	2
11	Yugoslavia	2
11	Poland	2
11	Germany	2
11	Argentina	2
11	Brazil	2
11	Nigeria	2
11	Morocco	2
11	Switzerland	2
20	Ivory Coast	1
20	Hungary	1
20	Ukraine	1
20	England	1
20	Zambia	1
20	Bosnia and Herzegovina	1
20	Senegal	1
20	Croatia	1

== CAF Confederation Cup ==
Year	Club	Winning Coach
2004	(Ghana) Hearts of Oak (1)	(Ghana) Cecil Jones Attuquayefio (1)
2005	(Morocco) FAR Rabat (1)	(Morocco) Mohamed Fakhir (1)
2006	(Tunisia) Étoile du Sahel (1)	(Tunisia) Faouzi Benzarti (1)
2007	(Tunisia) CS Sfaxien (1)	(Switzerland) Michel Decastel (1)
2008	(Tunisia) CS Sfaxien (2)	(Tunisia) Ghazi Ghrairi (1)
2009	(Mali) Stade Malien (1)	(Mali) Djibril Dramé (1)
2010	(Morocco) FUS Rabat (1)	(Morocco) Hussein Amotta (1)
2011	(Morocco) Maghreb de Fés (1)	(Morocco) Rachid Taoussi (1)
2012	(Republic of the Congo) AC Leopards (1)	(Cameroon) Joseph Marius Omog (1)
2013	(Tunisia) CS Sfaxien (3)	(Netherlands) Ruud Krol (1)
2014	(Egypt) Al Ahly (1)	(Spain) Juan Carlos Garrido (1)
2015	(Tunisia) Étoile du Sahel (2)	(Tunisia) Faouzi Benzarti (2)
2016	(Democratic Republic of the Congo) TP Mazembe (1)	(France) Hubert Velud (1)
2017	(Democratic Republic of the Congo) TP Mazembe (2)	(Democratic Republic of the Congo) Mihayo Kazembe (1)
2018	(Morocco) Raja CA (1)	(Spain) Juan Carlos Garrido (2)
2019	(Egypt) Zamalek (1)	(Switzerland) Christian Gross (1)
2020	(Morocco) RS Berkane (1)	(Morocco) Tarik Sektioui (1)
2021	(Morocco) Raja CA (2)	(Tunisia) Lassaad Chabbi (1)
2022	(Morocco) RS Berkane (1)	(Democratic Republic of the Congo) Florent Ibenge (1)
2023	(Algeria) USM Alger (1)	(Algeria) Abdelhak Bencheikha (1)
2024	(Egypt) Zamalek (2)	(Portugal) José Gomes (1)
2025	(Morocco) RS Berkane (2)	(Tunisia) Mouin Chaâbani (1)
2026	(Algeria) USM Alger (2)	(Senegal) Lamine N'Diaye (1)

=== Multiple Winners ===
Rank	Nation	Manager	Won	Years	Club(s)
1	(Spain)	Juan Carlos Garrido	2	2014, 2018	(Egypt) Al Ahly (Morocco) Raja CA
1	(Tunisia)	Faouzi Benzarti	2	2006, 2015	(Tunisia) Étoile du Sahel

=== By Nationality ===
#	Country	Titles
1	Tunisia	5
2	Morocco	4
2	Spain	2
2	Switzerland	2
2	DR Congo	2
3	Algeria	1
3	Cameroon	1
3	Congo	1
3	France	1
3	Ghana	1
3	Mali	1
3	Netherlands	1
3	Portugal	1

== CAF Super Cup ==
Year	Club	Winning Coach
1993	(Ivory Coast) Africa Sports (1)	(Ghana) Ibrahim Sunday (1)
1994	(Egypt) Zamalek SC (1)	(Egypt) Mahmoud El-Gohary (1)
1995	(Tunisia) Espérance Tunis (1)	(Tunisia) Faouzi Benzarti (1)
1996	(South Africa) Orlando Pirates (1)	(Ukraine) Viktor Bondarenko (1)
1997	(Egypt) Zamalek SC (2)	(Germany) Werner Olk (1)
1998	(Tunisia) Étoile Sahel (1)	(Croatia) Ivan Buljan (1)
1999	(Ivory Coast) ASEC Abidjan (1)	(France) Jean-Marc Guillou (1)
2000	(Morocco) Raja Casablanca (1)	(Argentina) Oscar Fullone (1)
2001	(Ghana) Hearts of Oak (1)	(Ghana) Cecil Jones Attuquayefio (1)
2002	(Egypt) Al-Ahly Cairo (1)	(Portugal) Manuel José (1)
2003	(Egypt) Zamalek SC (3)	(Brazil) Carlos Cabral (1)
2004	(Nigeria) Enyimba FC (1)	(Australia) Michael Urukalo (1)
2005	(Nigeria) Enyimba FC (2)	(Nigeria) Okey Emordi (1)
2006	(Egypt) Al-Ahly Cairo (2)	(Portugal) Manuel José (1)
2007	(Egypt) Al-Ahly Cairo (3)	(Portugal) Manuel José (2)
2008	(Tunisia) Étoile Sahel (2)	(France) Bertrand Marchand (1)
2009	(Egypt) Al-Ahly Cairo (4)	(Portugal) Manuel José (3)
2010	(Democratic Republic of the Congo) TP Mazembe (1)	(Italy) Diego Garzitto (1)
2011	(Democratic Republic of the Congo) TP Mazembe (2)	(Senegal) Lamine Ndiaye (1)
2012	(Morocco) MAS Fes (1)	(Morocco) Rachid Taoussi (1)
2013	(Egypt) Al-Ahly Cairo (5)	(Egypt) Hossam El-Badry (1)
2014	(Egypt) Al-Ahly Cairo (6)	(Egypt) Mohamed Youssef (1)
2015	(Algeria) ES Sétif (1)	(Algeria) Kheirredine Madoui (1)
2016	(Democratic Republic of the Congo) TP Mazembe (3)	(France) Hubert Velud (1)
2017	(South Africa) Mamelodi Sundowns (1)	(South Africa) Pitso Mosimane (1)
2018	(Morocco) Wydad Casablanca (1)	(Tunisia) Faouzi Benzarti (2)
2019	(Morocco) Raja Casablanca (2)	(France) Patrice Carteron (1)
2020	(Egypt) Zamalek SC (4)	(France) Patrice Carteron (2)
2021 (May)	(Egypt) Al-Ahly Cairo (7)	(South Africa) Pitso Mosimane (2)
2021 (December)	(Egypt) Al-Ahly Cairo (8)	(South Africa) Pitso Mosimane (3)
2022	(Morocco) RS Berkane (1)	(Algeria) Abdelhak Benchikha (1)
2023	(Algeria) USM Alger (1)	(Algeria) Abdelhak Benchikha (2)
2024	(Egypt) Zamalek SC (5)	(Portugal) José Gomes (1)
2025	(Egypt) Pyramids FC (1)	(Croatia) Krunoslav Jurčić (1)

=== Non-CAF competition ===
1982 African Super Cup is a match which took place on January 25, 1982 during the Tournament of Fraternity in Abidjan, Ivory Coast. JS Kabylie of Mahieddine Khalef and Stefan Żywotko won this trophy against the Cameroonians of Union Douala. The newspaper France Football commented on this event of the birth of the brand new African Super Cup.

== Defunct Competitions ==
=== CAF Cup Winner's Cup ===
Year	Club	Winning Coach
1975	(Cameroon) Tonnerre Yaoundé (1)	(Socialist Federal Republic of Yugoslavia) Vladimir Beara (1)
1976	(Nigeria) Shooting Stars (1)	(England) Allan Hawks (1)
1977	(Nigeria) Enugu Rangers (1)	(Nigeria) Godwin Achebe (1)
1978	(Guinea) Horoya AC (1)	(Guinea) Mario Dioubaté (1)
1979	(Cameroon) Canon Yaoundé (1)	(Socialist Federal Republic of Yugoslavia) Ivan Ridanovic (1)
1980	(Zaire) TP Mazembe (1)	(Zaire) Pierre Kalala (1)
1981	(Cameroon) Union Douala (1)	(Cameroon) Theophile Abong (1)
1982	(Egypt) Mokawloon (1)	(Germany) Michael Evert (1)
1983	(Egypt) Mokawloon (2)	(Germany) Michael Evert (2)
1984	(Egypt) Al Ahly (1)	(Egypt) Mahmoud El-Sayes (1)
1985	(Egypt) Al Ahly (2)	(Egypt) Mahmoud El-Gohary (1)
1986	(Egypt) Al Ahly (3)	(Egypt) Taha Ismail (1)
1987	(Kenya) Gor Mahia (1)	(Kenya) Jack Johnson (1)
1988	(Tunisia) CA Bizertin (1)	(Tunisia) Moncef Melliti (1)
1989	(Sudan) Al-Merrikh (1)	(Sudan) Mohammed Abdallah (1)
1990	(Nigeria) BCC Lions (1)	(Nigeria) Amodu Shaibu (1)
1991	(Zambia) Power Dynamos (1)	(Zambia) Fred Mwila (1)
1992	(Ivory Coast) Africa Sports (1)	(Ghana) Ibrahim Sunday (1)
1993	(Egypt) Al Ahly (4)	(England) Alan Harris (1)
1994	(Zaire) DC Motema Pembe (1)	(Mali) Mohamed Magassouba (1)
1995	(Algeria) JS Kabylie (1)	(Algeria) Djaffar Harouni (1)
1996	(Egypt) Mokawloon (3)	(Germany) Michael Krüger (1)
1997	(Tunisia) Etoile du Sahel (1)	(Brazil) José Dutra Dos Santos (1)
1998	(Tunisia) Espérance Tunis (1)	(Tunisia) Youssef Zouaoui (1)
1999	(Ivory Coast) Africa Sports (2)	(Ivory Coast) Yéo Martial (1)
2000	(Egypt) El-Zamalek (1)	(Germany) Otto Pfister (1)
2001	(South Africa) Kaizer Chiefs (1)	(Turkey) Muhsin Ertugral (1)
2002	(Morocco) Wydad Casablanca (1)	(Argentina) Oscar Fullone (1)
2003	(Tunisia) Etoile du Sahel (2)	(France) Rene Lobello (1)

=== CAF Cup ===
Season	Club	Winning Coach
1992	(Nigeria) Shooting Stars (1)	(Nigeria) Niyi Akande (1)
1993	(Ivory Coast) Stella Club d'Adjamé (1)	(Ivory Coast) Basile Wollé (1)
1994	(Nigeria) Bendel Insurance (1)	(Nigeria) Lawrence Akpokona (1)
1995	(Tunisia) Étoile Sahel (1)	(Brazil) José Dutra Dos Santos (1)
1996	(Morocco) Kawkab Marrakech (1)	(Morocco) Abdelkader Youmir (1)
1997	(Tunisia) Espérance Tunis (1)	(Tunisia) Youssef Zouaoui (1)
1998	(Tunisia) CS Sfaxien (1)	(Germany) Eckhard Krautzun (1)
1999	(Tunisia) Étoile Sahel (2)	(Tunisia) Lotfi Benzarti (1)
2000	(Algeria) JS Kabylie (1)	(Algeria) Nacer Sandjak (1) & (Algeria) Mahieddine Khalef (1)
2001	(Algeria) JS Kabylie (2)	(Algeria) Kamel Mouassa (1)
2002	(Algeria) JS Kabylie (3)	(France) Jean-Yves Chay (1)
2003	(Morocco) Raja Casablanca (1)	(France) Henri Michel (1)

== By number of titles (CAF) ==
CL	CAF Champions League
SC	CAF Super Cup
CC	CAF Confederation Cup
CWC	CAF Cup Winners' Cup (defunct)
CAF	CAF Cup (defunct)

=== By number of titles (CAF) ===
Nat.	Manager	CL	SC	CC	CWC	CAF	Total
(Portugal)	Manuel José	4	4	–	–	–	8
(South Africa)	Pitso Mosimane	3	3	–	–	–	6
(Tunisia)	Faouzi Benzarti	1	2	2	–	–	5
(Argentina)	Oscar Fulloné	2	1	–	1	–	4
(Egypt)	Mahmoud El-Gohary	2	1	–	1	–	4
(Tunisia)	Mouin Chaâbani	2	–	1	–	–	3
(Senegal)	Lamine N'Diaye	1	1	1	–	–	3
(Ghana)	Cecil Jones Attuquayefio	1	1	1	–	–	3
(Ghana)	Ibrahim Sunday	1	1	1	–	–	3
(France)	Patrice Carteron	1	2	–	–	–	3
(Algeria)	Abdelhak Benchikha	–	2	–	–	1	3
