= List of CAF Super Cup matches =

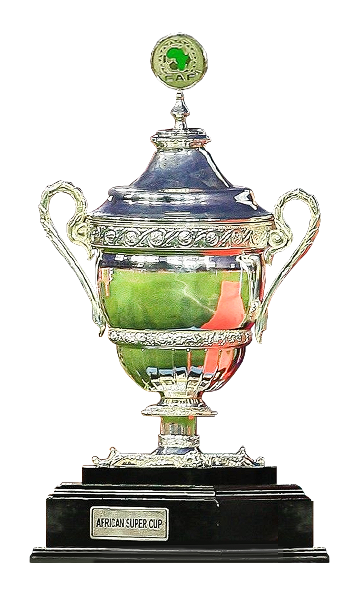
- CAF Super Cup Trophy
- Founded: 1993
- Region: Africa (CAF)
- Teams: 2
- Current champions: (Algeria) USM Alger (2nd title)
- Most championships: (Egypt) Al Ahly (8 titles)
- 2026 CAF Super Cup

The CAF Super Cup (also known as African Super Cup or for sponsorship reasons Orange CAF Super Cup) is an annual African association football competition contested between the winners of the CAF Champions League and the CAF Confederation Cup. The competition was first held in 1993 and is organised by the Confederation of African Football (CAF). It is the continental equivalent of the UEFA Super Cup in Europe and Recopa Sudamericana in South America.

The competition was previously contested between the winners of the CAF Champions League (called African Cup of Champions Clubs from 1964 to 1996) and African Cup Winners' Cup until 2004 when the Cup Winners' Cup was discontinued. The last Super Cup in this format was the 2004 CAF Super Cup between Enyimba and Étoile du Sahel which Enyimba won 1–0. In 2004 the CAF Cup Winners' Cup was merged with CAF Cup into the newly established CAF Confederation Cup which acts as Africa's second-tier international club competition, (analogous to the UEFA Europa League in European football) and since 2005 the competition is contested in its current format.

Egyptian side Al Ahly hold the record for the most victories, winning the competition Eight times since its inception. They are also one of only two teams to have retained the Super Cup title, doing so in 2007, after winning the previous competition in 2006 (the other being Nigerian side Enyimba who won the Super Cup in 2004 and 2005) and again in 2014. Teams from Egypt have won the competition the most, with teams from the country winning the competition fourteen times. Al Ahly is the most successful team with Eight titles.

== Finals ==
Key
Winners won after extra time
Winners won by a penalty shoot-out
Winners of African Cup / CAF Champions League
Winners of African Cup Winners' Cup
Winners of CAF Confederation Cup

- From 1993 to 2010, in case of a tie, extra time would be played. If still tied, the match would go to a penalty shoot-out.
- Starting from 2011, in case of a tie, no extra time will be played, and the match will go straight to a penalty shoot-out.

List of CAF Super Cup matches
Year	Winners		Score	Runners-up		Venue	Attendance	Note
Year	Nation	Club	Score	Club	Nation	Venue	Attendance	Note
1993	Ivory Coast	Africa Sports	2–2 (5–3 p)	Wydad Casablanca	Morocco	Stade Houphouët-Boigny, Abidjan	45,000	
1994	Egypt	Zamalek	1–0	Al Ahly	Egypt	FNB Stadium, Johannesburg	12,000	
1995	Tunisia	ES Tunis	3–0	DC Motema Pembe	Zaire	Alexandria Stadium, Alexandria	20,000	
1996	South Africa	Orlando Pirates	1–0	JS Kabylie	Algeria	FNB Stadium, Johannesburg	20,000	
1997	Egypt	Zamalek	0–0 (4–2 p)	Mokawloon	Egypt	Cairo International Stadium, Cairo	50,000	
1998	Tunisia	Étoile du Sahel	2–2 (4–2 p)	Raja Casablanca	Morocco	Stade Mohammed V, Casablanca	80,000	
1999	Ivory Coast	ASEC Mimosas	3–1	ES Tunis	Tunisia	Stade Houphouët-Boigny, Abidjan	20,000	
2000	Morocco	Raja Casablanca	2–0	Africa Sports	Ivory Coast	Stade Mohammed V, Casablanca	40,000	
2001	Ghana	Hearts of Oak	2–0	Zamalek	Egypt	Kumasi Sports Stadium, Kumasi^{[C]}	25,000	
2002	Egypt	Al Ahly	4–1	Kaizer Chiefs	South Africa	Cairo International Stadium, Cairo	80,000	
2003	Egypt	Zamalek	3–1	Wydad Casablanca	Morocco	Cairo International Stadium, Cairo		
2004	Nigeria	Enyimba	1–0	Étoile du Sahel	Tunisia	Aba Stadium, Aba	20,000	
2005	Nigeria	Enyimba	2–0	Hearts of Oak	Ghana	Aba Stadium, Aba		
2006	Egypt	Al Ahly	0–0 (4–2 p)	FAR Rabat	Morocco	Cairo International Stadium, Cairo		
2007	Egypt	Al Ahly	0–0 (5–4 p)	Étoile du Sahel	Tunisia	Addis Ababa Stadium, Addis Ababa	20,000	
2008	Tunisia	Étoile du Sahel	2–1	CS Sfaxien	Tunisia	Stade Olympique de Radès, Tunis	65,000	
2009	Egypt	Al Ahly	2–1	CS Sfaxien	Tunisia	Cairo International Stadium, Cairo	60,000	
2010	DR Congo	TP Mazembe	2–0	Stade Malien	Mali	Stade Kibasa Maliba, Lubumbashi	30,000	
2011	DR Congo	TP Mazembe	0–0 (9–8 p)	FUS Rabat	Morocco	Stade Kibasa Maliba, Lubumbashi	30,000	
2012	Morocco	Maghreb Fez	1–1 (4–3 p)	ES Tunis	Tunisia	Stade Olympique de Radès, Tunis		
2013	Egypt	Al Ahly	2–1	AC Léopards	Congo	Borg El Arab Stadium, Alexandria		
2014	Egypt	Al Ahly	3–2	CS Sfaxien	Tunisia	Cairo International Stadium, Cairo	30,000	
2015	Algeria	ES Sétif	1–1 (6–5 p)	Al Ahly	Egypt	Stade Mustapha Tchaker, Blida	15,000	
2016	DR Congo	TP Mazembe	2–1	Étoile du Sahel	Tunisia	Stade TP Mazembe, Lubumbashi	17,000	
2017	South Africa	Mamelodi Sundowns	1–0	TP Mazembe	DR Congo	Loftus Versfeld Stadium, Pretoria		
2018	Morocco	Wydad Casablanca	1–0	TP Mazembe	DR Congo	Stade Mohammed V, Casablanca	45,000	
2019	Morocco	Raja Casablanca	2–1	ES Tunis	Tunisia	Thani bin Jassim Stadium, Doha	20,500	
2020	Egypt	Zamalek	3–1	ES Tunis	Tunisia	Thani bin Jassim Stadium, Doha	20,000	
2021 (May)	Egypt	Al Ahly	2–0	RS Berkane	Morocco	Jassim bin Hamad Stadium, Doha	2,900	
2021 (Dec)	Egypt	Al Ahly	1–1 (6–5 p)	Raja Casablanca	Morocco	Ahmed bin Ali Stadium, Al Rayyan	40,000	
2022	Morocco	RS Berkane	2–0	Wydad Casablanca	Morocco	Prince Moulay Abdellah Stadium, Rabat		
2023	Algeria	USM Alger	1–0	Al Ahly	Egypt	King Fahd Sports City, Ta’if, Saudi Arabia	10,000	
2024	Egypt	Zamalek	1–1 (4–3 p)	Al Ahly	Egypt	Kingdom Arena, Riyadh, Saudi Arabia	28,000	
2025	Egypt	Pyramids	1–0	Berkane	Morocco	30 June Stadium, Cairo	4,000	
2026	Algeria	USM Alger	3–1	Mamelodi Sundowns	South Africa	Loftus Versfeld Stadium, Pretoria	10,000	

== Performances ==
=== Results by club ===
Performance by club
Club	Winners	Runners-up	Years won	Years runner-up
(Egypt) Al Ahly	8	4	2002, 2006, 2007, 2009, 2013, 2014, 2021 (May), 2021 (Dec)	1994, 2015, 2023, 2024
(Egypt) Zamalek	5	1	1994, 1997, 2003, 2020, 2024	2001
(Democratic Republic of the Congo) TP Mazembe	3	2	2010, 2011, 2016	2017, 2018
(Tunisia) Étoile du Sahel	2	3	1998, 2008	2004, 2007, 2016
(Morocco) Raja Casablanca	2	2	2000, 2019	1998, 2021 (Dec)
(Nigeria) Enyimba	2	0	2004, 2005	—
(Algeria) USM Alger	2	0	2023, 2026	—
(Tunisia) Espérance de Tunis	1	4	1995	1999, 2012, 2019, 2020
(Morocco) Wydad Casablanca	1	3	2018	1993, 2003, 2022
(Morocco) RS Berkane	1	2	2022	2021 (May), 2025
(Ivory Coast) Africa Sports	1	1	1993	2000
(Ghana) Hearts of Oak	1	1	2001	2005
(South Africa) Mamelodi Sundowns	1	1	2017	2026
(South Africa) Orlando Pirates FC	1	0	1996	—
(Ivory Coast) ASEC Mimosas	1	0	1999	—
(Morocco) Maghreb Fez	1	0	2012	—
(Algeria) ES Sétif	1	0	2015	—
(Egypt) Pyramids FC	1	0	2025	—
(Tunisia) CS Sfaxien	0	3	—	2008, 2009, 2014
(Democratic Republic of the Congo) DC Motema Pembe	0	1	—	1995
(Algeria) JS Kabylie	0	1	—	1996
(Egypt) Al Mokawloon Al Arab	0	1	—	1997
(South Africa) Kaizer Chiefs FC	0	1	—	2002
(Morocco) FAR Rabat	0	1	—	2006
(Mali) Stade Malien	0	1	—	2010
(Morocco) FUS Rabat	0	1	—	2011
(Republic of the Congo) AC Léopards	0	1	—	2013

=== Results by country ===
Performance by nation
Nation	Winners	Runners-up
Egypt	14	6
Morocco	5	9
Tunisia	3	10
DR Congo^{[B]}	3	3
Algeria	3	1
South Africa	2	2
Ivory Coast	2	1
Nigeria	2	0
Ghana	1	1
Congo	0	1
Mali	0	1

=== By zone ===
Performance by continental zone
Zone	Winners	Runners-up
UNAF (North Africa)	24	26
WAFU (West Africa)	5	3
UNIFFAC (Central Africa)	3	4
COSAFA (Southern Africa)	2	1
CECAFA (East Africa)	0	0

=== By method of qualification ===
Winners by method of qualification
Cup	Winners	Runners-up
CAF Champions League*	26	8
CAF Confederation Cup	6	16
African Cup Winners' Cup**	2	10

(*): Known as African Cup of Champions Clubs from 1964 to 1996
(**): Merged with CAF Cup in 2004 to form CAF Confederation Cup.

== Notes ==
A. ^{a} ^{b} ^{c} The Confederation of African Football and RSSSF classify Super Cup editions as belonging to the football season in which the qualified teams won their respective tournaments, even though the Super Cup match is always played in February or March the following year. On the other hand, FIFA lists them according to the calendar year in which the match was played. This article uses the latter format.
B. ^{a} ^{b} ^{c} In 1995 DC Motema Pembe, based in Kinshasa, represented Zaire, which was the name used between 1971 and 1997 for today's Democratic Republic of the Congo.
C. In 2001 the Super Cup was originally planned to be held in Accra, Ghana, but Zamalek sought a change of venue to Cairo, citing safety concerns following the incidents at the 2000 CAF Champions League final when the match was interrupted for 18 minutes after teargas had been fired into the rioting crowd. CAF eventually imposed a year-long ban on international club football at Hearts of Oak's stadium and decided to move the Super Cup venue to Kumasi.
