= JS Kabylie in African football =

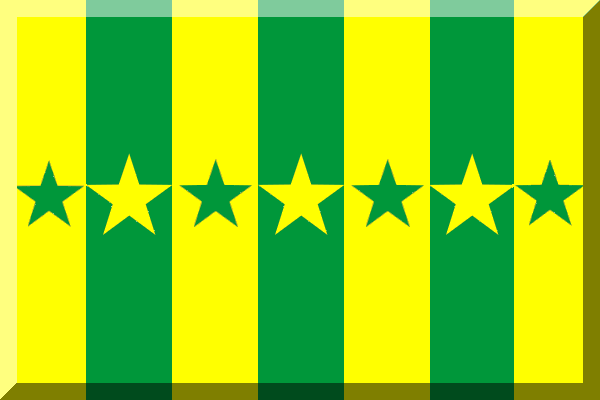
- JS Kabylie's colours
- Club: JS Kabylie
- Most appearances: Dahmane Haffaf (50)
- Top scorer: Nacer Bouiche (11)
- First entry: 1978 African Cup of Champions Clubs
- Latest entry: 2025–26 CAF Champions League

Titles
- Champions League: 2: 1981; 1990
- Cup Winners' Cup: 1: 1995
- CAF Cup: 3: 2000; 2001; 2002
- Super Cup: 1: 1982 (non-CAF)

Jeunesse Sportive de Kabylie is an Algerian professional football club based in Tizi Ouzou, Kabylia, that has gained entry to Confederation of African Football (CAF) competitions on 31 occasions. The Kabyle club has represented Algeria in the CAF Champions League on 18 occasions, the CAF Confederation Cup on five occasions, the now-defunct African Cup Winners' Cup on two occasions, the now-defunct CAF Cup on four occasions, the CAF Super Cup on one occasion and the African Super Cup (non-CAF) on one occasion.

== Overview ==
JS Kabylie is the most successful Algerian club at both the national level and the African level with 28 major trophies.

At the national level, the club has won the Algerian Ligue 1 a record 14 times, the Algerian Cup five times, the Algerian League Cup once and the Algerian Super Cup once.

At the African level, the Kabyles have won the CAF Champions League, Africa's most prestigious competition, twice in 1981 and 1990, the African Cup Winners' Cup once in 1995, the CAF Cup a record three times in 2000, 2001 and 2002 and the first ever (albeit unofficial) African Super Cup once in 1982.

== CAF competitions ==
Information correct as of match against Young Africans SC on 15 February 2026.

JS Kabylie results in CAF competition
Season	Competition	Round	Opposition	Home	Away	Aggregate
1978	Cup of Champions Clubs	Second round	(Libya) Al-Tahaddy	1–0	2–0	3–0
1978	Cup of Champions Clubs	Quarter-Finals	(Zaire) AS Vita Club	3–2	0–1	3–3 (a)
1981	Cup of Champions Clubs	First Round	(Libya) Al Ahli Tripoli	2–1	0–0	2–1
1981	Cup of Champions Clubs	Second Round	(Somalia) Horseed FC	Walkover	2–1	2–1
1981	Cup of Champions Clubs	Quarter-Finals	(Zimbabwe) Dynamos	3–0	2–2	5–2
1981	Cup of Champions Clubs	Semi-finals	(Egypt) Al Ahly	Walkover		
1981	Cup of Champions Clubs	Final	(Zaire) AS Vita Club	4–0	1–0	5–0
1982	Cup of Champions Clubs	First round	(Sudan) Al-Hilal	1–0	0–1	1–1 (1–4 p)
1983	Cup of Champions Clubs	First round	(Libya) Al-Ahli Tripoli	2–0	1–0	3–0
1983	Cup of Champions Clubs	Second round	(Senegal) ASC Diaraf	0–1	0–0	0–1
1984	Cup of Champions Clubs	First round	(Sierra Leone) Real Republicans	1–0	2–1	3–1
1984	Cup of Champions Clubs	Second round	(Guinea-Bissau) Sporting de Bissau	Walkover		
1984	Cup of Champions Clubs	Quarter-Finals	(Zimbabwe) Dynamos	2–0	0–2	2–2 (3–2 p)
1984	Cup of Champions Clubs	Semi-finals	(Egypt) Zamalek	3–1	0–3	3–4
1986	Cup of Champions Clubs	First round	(Burkina Faso) EF Ouagadougou	5–0	1–1	6–1
1986	Cup of Champions Clubs	Second round	(Tunisia) Espérance de Tunis	2–1	0–1	2–2 (a)
1990	Cup of Champions Clubs	First round	(Togo) ASKO Kara	6–0	4–0	10–0
1990	Cup of Champions Clubs	Second round	(Republic of the Congo) Étoile du Congo	2–0	2–2	4–2
1990	Cup of Champions Clubs	Quarter-finals	(Kenya) AFC Leopards	3–0	1–2	4–2
1990	Cup of Champions Clubs	Semi-finals	(Ghana) Asante Kotoko	2–0	0–1	2–1
1990	Cup of Champions Clubs	Final	(Zambia) Nkana Red Devils	1–0	0–1	1–1 (5–3 p)
1991	Cup of Champions Clubs	First round	(Chad) Elect Sport N'Djamena	6–0	0–1	6–1
1991	Cup of Champions Clubs	Second round	(Morocco) Wydad Casablanca	1–0	0–3	1–3
1993	Cup Winners' Cup	First round	(Mauritania) ASC SNIM	8–1	3–1	11–2
1993	Cup Winners' Cup	Second round	(Benin) Dragons de l'Ouémé	4–0	0–3	4–3
1993	Cup Winners' Cup	Quarter-finals	(Ivory Coast) Africa Sports	1–0	0–4	1–4
1995	Cup Winners' Cup	Second round	(Ivory Coast) Stade d'Abidjan	2–0	0–1	2–1
1995	Cup Winners' Cup	Quarter-finals	(Ghana) Hearts of Oak	3–1	1–2	4–3
1995	Cup Winners' Cup	Semi-finals	(Zimbabwe) Blackpool	1–0	1–2	2–2 (a)
1995	Cup Winners' Cup	Final	(Nigeria) Julius Berger	2–1	1–1	3–2
1996	CAF Super Cup	Final	(South Africa) Orlando Pirates		0–1	0–1
1996	Cup of Champions Clubs	First round	(Cape Verde) Boavista	2–0	2–1	4–1
1996	Cup of Champions Clubs	Second round	(Burundi) Fantastique	0–0	1–0	1–0
1996	Cup of Champions Clubs	Quarter-finals	(Angola) Petro Atlético	1–0	1–1	2–1
1996	Cup of Champions Clubs	Semi-finals	(Nigeria) Shooting Stars	1–1	0–1	1–2
2000	CAF Cup	First round	(Chad) Aslad Moundou	Walkover		
2000	CAF Cup	Second round	(Democratic Republic of the Congo) TP Mazembe	5–0	0–2	5–2
2000	CAF Cup	Quarter-finals	(Tunisia) Étoile du Sahel	1–0	0–1	1–1 (4–1 p)
2000	CAF Cup	Semi-finals	(Nigeria) Iwuanyanwu Nationale	1–0	1–1	2–1
2000	CAF Cup	Final	(Egypt) Ismaily SC	0–0	1–1	1–1 (a)
2001	CAF Cup	Second round	(Ethiopia) Mebrat Hail	2–0	0–1	2–1
2001	CAF Cup	Quarter-finals	(Morocco) Wydad Casablanca	2–0	1–0	3–0
2001	CAF Cup	Semi-finals	(Ivory Coast) Africa Sport	2–0	1–3	3–3 (a)
2001	CAF Cup	Final	(Tunisia) Étoile du Sahel	1–0	1–2	2–2 (a)
2002	CAF Cup	Second round	(Senegal) ASC Ndiambour	6–3	0–0	6–3
2002	CAF Cup	Quarter-finals	(Mali) Djoliba AC	2–1	0–0	2–1
2002	CAF Cup	Semi-finals	(Egypt) Al-Masry	2–0	0–1	2–1
2002	CAF Cup	Final	(Cameroon) Tonnerre Yaoundé	4–0	0–1	4–1
2003	CAF Cup	Second round	(Senegal) SONACOS	0–0	1–1	1–1 (a)
2003	CAF Cup	Quarter-finals	(Cameroon) Coton Sport	0–0	1–2	1–2
2005	CAF Champions League	First round	(Guinea) Fello Star	0–0	0–1	0–1
2006	CAF Champions League	Preliminary round	(Libya) Al-Ittihad	4–0	1–1	5–1
2006	CAF Champions League	First round	(Zambia) Zanaco FC	3–0	0–1	3–1
2006	CAF Champions League	Second round	(Morocco) Raja Casablanca	3–1	0–1	3–2
2006	CAF Champions League	Group stage	(Ghana) Asante Kotoko	1–0	1–2	4th place
2006	CAF Champions League	Group stage	(Egypt) Al Ahly	2–2	0–2	4th place
2006	CAF Champions League	Group stage	(Tunisia) CS Sfaxien	0–1	0–2	4th place
2007	CAF Champions League	Preliminary round	(Guinea-Bissau) CF Os Balantas	3–1	2–1	5–2
2007	CAF Champions League	First round	(Gabon) AS Mangasport	3–0	1–3	4–3
2007	CAF Champions League	Second round	(Cameroon) Coton Sport	2–0	0–1	2–1
2007	CAF Champions League	Group stage	(Libya) Al-Ittihad	3–1	0–1	3rd place
2007	CAF Champions League	Group stage	(Morocco) FAR Rabat	2–0	1–1	3rd place
2007	CAF Champions League	Group stage	(Tunisia) Étoile du Sahel	0–2	0–3	3rd place
2008	CAF Champions League	First round	(Ghana) Ashanti Gold SC	3–0	0–0	3–0
2008	CAF Champions League	Second round	(Cameroon) Coton Sport	2–1	0–3	2–4
2008	CAF Confederation Cup	Play-off round	(Cameroon) Les Astres	1–1	1–0	2–1
2008	CAF Confederation Cup	Group stage	(Sudan) Al-Merrikh	3–1	1–3	3rd place
2008	CAF Confederation Cup	Group stage	(Tunisia) Étoile du Sahel	1–0	0–2	3rd place
2008	CAF Confederation Cup	Group stage	(Ghana) Asante Kotoko	2–0	1–3	3rd place
2009	CAF Champions League	First round	(Libya) Al Ahly Tripoli	1–2	0–1	1–3
2010	CAF Champions League	Preliminary round	(The Gambia) Armed Forces	3–0	2–1	5–1
2010	CAF Champions League	First round	(Tunisia) Club Africain	1–0	1–1	2–1
2010	CAF Champions League	Second round	(Angola) Petro Atlético	2–0	1–2	3–2
2010	CAF Champions League	Group stage	(Egypt) Ismaily	1–0	1–0	1st place
2010	CAF Champions League	Group stage	(Nigeria) Heartland	1–0	1–1	1st place
2010	CAF Champions League	Group stage	(Egypt) Al Ahly	1–0	1–1	1st place
2010	CAF Champions League	Semi-finals	(Democratic Republic of the Congo) TP Mazembe	0–0	1–3	1–3
2011	CAF Confederation Cup	First round	(Mauritania) ASC Tevragh-Zeïna	1–0	2–1	3–1
2011	CAF Confederation Cup	Second round	(Gabon) Missile FC	3–0	0–3	3–3 (3–0 p)
2011	CAF Confederation Cup	Play-off round	(Senegal) ASC Diaraf	2–0	1–1	3–1
2011	CAF Confederation Cup	Group stage	(Morocco) Maghreb de Fès	0–1	0–1	4th place
2011	CAF Confederation Cup	Group stage	(Nigeria) Sunshine Stars	1–2	0–1	4th place
2011	CAF Confederation Cup	Group stage	(Democratic Republic of the Congo) Motema Pembe	0–2	0–2	4th place
2017	CAF Confederation Cup	First round	(Liberia) Monrovia Club Breweries	4–0	0–3	4–3
2017	CAF Confederation Cup	Second round	(Republic of the Congo) Étoile du Congo	1–0	0–0	1–0
2017	CAF Confederation Cup	Play-off round	(Democratic Republic of the Congo) TP Mazembe	0–0	0–2	0–2
2019–20	CAF Champions League	Preliminary round	(Sudan) Al-Merrikh	1–0	2–3	3–3 (a)
2019–20	CAF Champions League	First round	(Guinea) Horoya	2–0	0–2	2–2 (5–3 p)
2019–20	CAF Champions League	Group stage	(Democratic Republic of the Congo) AS Vita Club	1–0	1–4	3rd place
2019–20	CAF Champions League	Group stage	(Tunisia) Espérance de Tunis	1–0	0–1	3rd place
2019–20	CAF Champions League	Group stage	(Morocco) Raja Casablanca	0–0	0–2	3rd place
2020–21	CAF Confederation Cup	Second round	(Niger) USGN	2–0	2–1	4–1
2020–21	CAF Confederation Cup	Play Off	(Mali) Stade Malien	1–0	1–2	2–2 (a)
2020–21	CAF Confederation Cup	Group stage	(Morocco) RS Berkane	0–0	0–0	1st place
2020–21	CAF Confederation Cup	Group stage	(Cameroon) Coton Sport	1–0	2–1	1st place
2020–21	CAF Confederation Cup	Group stage	(Zambia) NAPSA Stars	2–1	2–2	1st place
2020–21	CAF Confederation Cup	Quarter final	(Tunisia) CS Sfaxien	1–1	1–0	2–1
2020–21	CAF Confederation Cup	Semi final	(Cameroon) Coton Sport	3–0	2–1	5–1
2020–21	CAF Confederation Cup	Final	(Morocco) Raja Casablanca	1–2		1–2
2021–22	CAF Confederation Cup	Second round	(Morocco) FAR Rabat	2–1	1–0	3–1
2021–22	CAF Confederation Cup	Play Off	(Eswatini) Royal Leopards	2–1	0–1	2–2 (a)
2022–23	CAF Champions League	First Round	(Senegal) Casa Sports	3–0	0–1	3–1
2022–23	CAF Champions League	Second Round	(Togo) ASKO Kara	1–1	2–1	3–2
2022–23	CAF Champions League	Group stage	(Angola) Petro Atlético	1–0	0–0	2nd place
2022–23	CAF Champions League	Group stage	(Morocco) Wydad Casablanca	1–0	0–3	2nd place
2022–23	CAF Champions League	Group stage	(Democratic Republic of the Congo) AS Vita Club	2–1	0–1	2nd place
2022–23	CAF Champions League	Quarter final	(Tunisia) Espérance de Tunis	0–1	1–1	1–2
2025–26	CAF Champions League	First Round	(Ghana) Bibiani Gold Stars FC	5–0	2–0	7–0
2025–26	CAF Champions League	Second Round	(Tunisia) US Monastir	2–1	3–0	5–1
2025–26	CAF Champions League	Group stage	(Egypt) Al Ahly	0–0	1–4	4th place
2025–26	CAF Champions League	Group stage	(Tanzania) Young Africans SC	0–0	0–3	4th place
2025–26	CAF Champions League	Group stage	(Morocco) FAR Rabat	0–0	0–1	4th place

=== Non-CAF competition ===
The 1982 African Super Cup is a match which took place on January 25, 1982, during the Tournament of Fraternity in Abidjan, Ivory Coast. JS Kabylie won this trophy against the Cameroonians of Union Douala. The newspaper France Football commented on this event of the birth of the brand new African Super Cup.

Date	Team name	Score	Team name	Venue	References
25 January 1982	(Algeria) JS Kabylie ^{1981 CL winner}	1–1 (JS Kabylie wins 4–3 on penalties)	(Cameroon) Union Douala ^{1981 CWC winner}	Felix Houphouet Boigny Stadium (Abidjan, Ivory Coast)	

== Statistics ==
=== By season ===
Information correct as of match against Young Africans SC on 15 February 2026.
Key

- Pld = Played
- W = Games won
- D = Games drawn
- L = Games lost
- F = Goals for
- A = Goals against
- Grp = Group stage
- PR = Preliminary round
- R1 = First round
- R2 = Second round
- PO = Play-off round
- R16 = Round of 16
- QF = Quarter-final
- SF = Semi-final

Key to colours and symbols:

W	Winners
RU	Runners-up

JS Kabylie record in African football by season
Season	Competition	Pld	W	D	L	GF	GA	GD	Round
1978	Cup of Champions Clubs	4	3	0	1	6	3	+3	QF
1981	Cup of Champions Clubs	7	5	2	0	14	4	+10	W
1982	African Super Cup	1	1	0	0	1	1	+0	W
1982	Cup of Champions Clubs	2	1	0	1	1	1	+0	R1
1983	Cup of Champions Clubs	4	2	1	1	3	1	+2	R2
1984	Cup of Champions Clubs	6	4	0	2	8	7	+1	SF
1986	Cup of Champions Clubs	4	2	1	1	8	3	+5	R2
1990	Cup of Champions Clubs	10	6	1	3	21	6	+15	W
1991	Cup of Champions Clubs	4	2	0	2	7	4	+3	R2
1993	African Cup Winners' Cup	6	4	0	2	16	9	+7	QF
1995	African Cup Winners' Cup	8	4	1	3	11	8	+3	W
1996	CAF Super Cup	1	0	0	1	0	1	−1	RU
1996	Cup of Champions Clubs	8	4	3	1	8	4	+4	SF
2000	CAF Cup	8	3	3	2	9	5	+4	W
2001	CAF Cup	8	5	0	3	10	6	+4	W
2002	CAF Cup	8	4	2	2	14	6	+8	W
2003	CAF Cup	4	0	3	1	2	3	−1	QF
2005	CAF Champions League	2	0	1	1	0	1	−1	R1
2006	CAF Champions League	12	4	2	6	15	13	+2	Grp
2007	CAF Champions League	12	6	1	5	17	14	+3	Grp
2008	CAF Champions League	4	2	1	1	5	4	+1	R2
2008	CAF Confederation Cup	8	4	1	3	10	10	+0	Grp
2009	CAF Champions League	2	0	0	2	1	3	−2	R1
2010	CAF Champions League	14	8	4	2	17	9	+8	SF
2011	CAF Confederation Cup	12	4	1	7	10	14	−4	Grp
2017	CAF Confederation Cup	6	2	2	2	5	5	+0	PO
2019–20	CAF Champions League	10	4	1	5	8	12	−4	Grp
2020–21	CAF Confederation Cup	15	9	4	2	21	11	+10	RU
2021–22	CAF Confederation Cup	4	3	0	1	5	3	+2	PO
2022–23	CAF Champions League	12	5	3	4	11	10	+1	QF
2025–26	CAF Champions League	10	4	3	3	13	9	+4	Grp
Total		223	111	41	71	278	193	+85	

=== By competition ===
==== In Africa ====
As of 15 February 2026:

CAF competitions
Competition	Seasons	Played	Won	Drawn	Lost	Goals For	Goals Against	Best results Titles	Last season played
Champions League	18	132	66	24	42	165	112	1st place, gold medalist(s)	2025–26
Cup Winners' Cup (defunct)	2	14	8	1	5	27	17	1st place, gold medalist(s)	1995
CAF Confederation Cup	5	45	22	8	15	51	43	2nd place, silver medalist(s)	2021–22
CAF Cup (defunct)	4	30	14	8	8	34	19	1st place, gold medalist(s)	2003
CAF Super Cup	1	1	0	0	1	0	1	2nd place, silver medalist(s)	1996
African Super Cup (non-CAF)	1	1	1	0	0	1	1	(gold)	1982
Total	31	223	111	41	71	278	193	7	

=== Finals ===
Matches won after regular time (90 minutes of play), extra-time (aet) or a penalty shootout (p) are highlighted in green, while losses are highlighted in red.

27 November 1981 Cup of Champions Clubs (1L)	JE Tizi-Ouzou (Algeria)	4–0	(Zaire) AS Vita Club	Tizi Ouzou
--:-- UTC+1	Bahbouh 16', 38'; Belahcène 56'; Larbes 65' (pen.)			Stadium: 1st November Stadium; Attendance: 20 000; Referee: Ali Bin Nasser (Tunisia)

13 December 1981 Cup of Champions Clubs (2L)	AS Vita Club (Zaire)	0–1	(Algeria) JE Tizi-Ouzou	Kinshasa
--:-- UTC+1			Belahcène 49'	Stadium: 20 May Stadium; Attendance: 30 000; Referee: Cheikh Djibril MBaye (Senegal)

25 January 1982 African Super Cup	JE Tizi-Ouzou (Algeria)	1–1 (4–3 p)	(Cameroon) Union Douala	Abidjan
	Maghrici 40'		Kamga 72' (pen.)	Stadium: Felix Houphouet Boigny Stadium

30 November 1990 Cup of Champions Clubs (1L)	JS Kabylie (Algeria)	1–0	(Zambia) Nkana Red Devils	Algiers
--:-- UTC+1	Rahmouni 47' (pen.)			Stadium: Stade du 5 Juillet; Attendance: 70,000; Referee: Badara Sène (Senegal)

22 December 1990 Cup of Champions Clubs (2L)	Nkana Red Devils (Zambia)	1–0 (3–5 p)	(Algeria) JS Kabylie	Lusaka
--:-- UTC+2	Bwalya 80' (pen.)			Stadium: Independence Stadium; Attendance: 35,000; Referee: Idrissa Sarr (Mauritania)
	Penalties
	Chambeshi (penalty scored); Bwalya (penalty scored); Sikazwe (penalty scored); Malitoli (penalty missed)		(penalty scored) Rahmouni; (penalty scored) Meftah; (penalty scored) Haffaf; (penalty scored) Adane; (penalty scored) Medane

25 November 1995 Cup Winners' Cup (1L)	Julius Berger (Nigeria)	1–1	(Algeria) JS Kabylie	Lagos
	Obo 88'		Menad 90+2'	Stadium: Surulere National Stadium

8 December 1995 Cup Winners' Cup (2L)	JS Kabylie (Algeria)	2–1	(Nigeria) Julius Berger	Algiers
	Menad 65'; Benchikha 80'		Obo 17'	Stadium: Stade 5 Juillet 1962; Attendance: 45,000; Referee: Becaye Magassa (Mali)

2 March 1996 CAF Super Cup	Orlando Pirates (South Africa)	1–0	(Algeria) JS Kabylie	Cape Town
	Ramokadi 54'	Report		Stadium: Newlands Stadium; Attendance: 20,000; Referee: Lim Kee Chong (Mauritius)

17 November 2000 CAF Cup (1L)	Ismaily (Egypt)	1–1	(Algeria) JS Kabylie	Ismaïlia
	Barakat 60' (pen.)	Report	Bendahmane 72'	Stadium: Ismailia Stadium; Referee: Hichem Kirat (Tunisia)
Note: Lineup for JS Kabylie - Boughrara, Nazef, Raho, Driouèche, Benhamlat, Zafour, Bendahmane, Dob, Belkaïd, Medane (Abaci 38’), Moussouni (Benkaci 86’).

1 December 2000 CAF Cup (2L)	JS Kabylie (Algeria)	0–0 (1–1 agg.)	(Egypt) Ismaily	Algiers
		Report		Stadium: Stade du 5 Juillet; Referee: Magassa, Danté, Traoré (Mali)
Note: Lineup for JS Kabylie - Bougherara, Nazef, Benhamlet, Zafour, Driouche, Akriche, Raho, Dob, Bendahmane, Meddane (Abaci 55’), Moussouni.

10 November 2001 CAF Cup (1L)	Étoile du Sahel (Tunisia)	2–1	(Algeria) JS Kabylie	Sousse
	Keita 14', 74'	Report	Boubrit 42'	Stadium: Stade Olympique de Sousse; Referee: Tessema, Shaw, Gebert
Note: Lineup for JS Kabylie - Gaouaoui, Raho, Benhamlat, Driouche, Zafour, Meftah, Dob, Bendahmane (Abaci 83’), Belkaïd, Boubrit, Bezzaz (Berguigua 86’).

23 November 2001 CAF Cup (2L)	JS Kabylie (Algeria)	1–0 (2–2 agg.)	(Tunisia) Étoile du Sahel	Algiers
	Zafour 30'	Report		Stadium: Stade du 5 Juillet; Referee: Kanoute, Traoré, Diabate (Mali)
Note: Lineup for JS Kabylie - Gaouaoui, (Bougherara 70’), Raho, Benhamlat, Driouèche, Zafour, Belkaïd, Nazef, Abaci, Bendahmane, Berguigua, Dob.

8 November 2002 CAF Cup (1L)	JS Kabylie (Algeria)	4–0	(Cameroon) Tonnerre Yaoundé	Algiers
21:30	Amaouche 2'; Berguiga 45', 85'; Drioueche 61'			Stadium: Stade 5 Juillet 1962; Referee: Coffi Codjia (Benin)
Note: Lineup for JS Kabylie - Gaouaoui, Raho, Drioueche, Zafour, Djouder, Mounir Dob (Meghraoui 76'), Bendahmane, Belkaïd, Boubrit (Dilmi 26'), Amaouche (Fodhil Dob 89'), Berguiga.

24 November 2002 CAF Cup (2L)	Tonnerre Yaoundé (Cameroon)	1–0 (1–4 agg.)	(Algeria) JS Kabylie	Yaoundé
15:30	Eyoum 11'	Report		Stadium: Stade Ahmadou Ahidjo; Referee: Hichem Guirat (Tunisia)
Note: Lineup for JS Kabylie - Gaouaoui, Raho (Boubrit 58'), Drioueche, Zafour, Djouder, Mounir Dob, Bendahmane, Belkaïd, Fodhil Dob (Hammoudi 78'), Amaouche, Berguiga.

10 July 2021 CAF Confederation Cup	Raja Casablanca (Morocco)	2–1	(Algeria) JS Kabylie	Cotonou
19:00	Rahimi 5'; Malango 14'		Boulahia 46'	Stadium: Stade de l'Amitié; Referee: Victor Gomes (South Africa)
Note: Lineup for JS Kabylie - Benbot, Kerroum, Bencherifa, Souyad, Aït Abdesslem, Raiah (Hamroune 46'), Oukaci (Boualia 69'), Benchaira, Benabdi, Bensayah (Tubal 76'), Boulahia (Nezla 76').

== African competitions goals ==
Statistics correct as of match against Young Africans SC on 15 February 2026.

=== List of JS Kabylie scorers in African competitions ===
P	Player	TOTAL	CCL	CWC	~~CAC~~ CCC	SC
=	ALG Nacer Bouiche	11	11	–	–	–
=	MLI Cheick Oumar Dabo	10	10	–	–	–
=	ALG Tarek Hadj Adlane	9	2	7	–	–
=	ALG Ali Belahcène	8	8	–	–	–
=	ALG Hamid Berguiga	8	3	–	5	–
=	ALG Hamza Yacef	8	8	–	–	–
=	ALG Ali Fergani	6	6	–	–	–
=	ALG Hakim Medane	6	6	–	–	–
=	ALG Rédha Bensayah	6	1	–	5	–
=	ALG Lahlou Akhrib	5	5	–	–	–
=	ALG Djamel Menad	5	2	3	–	–
=	ALG Yacine Bezzaz	5	–	–	5	–
=	ALG Fawzi Moussouni	5	–	1	4	–
=	ALG Badreddine Souyad	5	1	–	4	–
=	ALG Farouk Belkaïd	4	–	–	4	–
=	ALG Nabil Hemani	4	4	–	–	–
=	ALG Tahar Benkaci	4	1	3	–	–
=	ALG Adlène Bensaïd	4	1	–	3	–
=	ALG Saad Tedjar	4	1	–	3	–
=	ALG Chemseddine Nessakh	4	–	–	4	–
=	ALG Mourad Aït Tahar	4	4	–	–	–
=	ALG Kamel Aouis	3	3	–	–	–
=	ALG Bachir Douadi	3	3	–	–	–
=	ALG Hamza Banouh	3	3	–	–	–
=	ALG Lyes Bahbouh	3	3	–	–	–
=	ALG Mourad Rahmouni	3	3	–	–	–
=	ALG Mohamed Amine Aoudia	3	3	–	–	–
=	ALG Farès Hamiti	3	3	–	–	–
=	ALG Rachid Baris	3	3	–	–	–
=	ALG Nabil Yaâlaoui	3	2	–	1	–
=	ALG Mahieddine Meftah	3	–	3	–	–
=	ALG Mounir Dob	3	–	–	3	–
=	ALG Mohamed Boulaouidet	3	–	–	3	–
=	ALG Lounès Bendahmane	3	–	–	3	–
=	ALG Youcef Saïbi	3	3	–	–	–
=	ALG Abderrazak Djahnit	3	3	–	–	–
=	ALG Nassim Oussalah	3	2	–	1	–
=	ALG Zakaria Boulahia	3	–	–	3	–
=	ALG Massinissa Nezla	3	1	–	2	–
=	ALG Mehdi Merghem	3	3	–	–	–
=	ALG Toufik Addadi	2	2	–	–	–
=	ALG Nassim Hamlaoui	2	2	–	–	–
=	ALG Tayeb Berramla	2	–	–	2	–
=	ALG Salah Larbès	2	2	–	–	–
=	ALG Youcef Ladjadj	2	2	–	–	–
=	ALG Kamel Termoul	2	–	2	–	–
=	ALG Yacine Amaouche	2	1	–	1	–
=	ALG Sid Ali Yahia-Chérif	2	1	–	1	–
=	ALG Hakim Boubrit	2	–	1	1	–
=	ALG Rafik Abdesselam	2	2	–	–	–
=	ALG Moussa Saïb	2	2	–	–	–
=	ALG Rezki Hamroune	2	2	–	–	–
=	ALG Walid Bencherifa	2	–	–	2	–
=	ALG Ali Haroun	2	–	–	2	–
=	ALG Dadi El Hocine Mouaki	2	2	–	–	–
=	SEN Babacar Sarr	2	2	–	–	–
=	ALG Kamel Abdesselam	1	1	–	–	–
=	ALG Rachid Adane	1	–	1	–	–
=	ALG Hakim Amaouche	1	–	1	–	–
=	ALG Mourad Karouf	1	–	1	–	–
=	ALG Mourad Aït Mouloud	1	–	1	–	–
=	ALG Ryad Benchikha	1	–	1	–	–
=	ALG Hocine Gasmi	1	–	–	1	–
=	ALG Ramzy Saib	1	–	–	1	–
=	ALG Mohamed Reda Abaci	1	–	–	1	–
=	ALG Brahim Zafour	1	–	–	1	–
=	ALG Slimane Raho	1	–	–	1	–
=	ALG Fodil Dob	1	–	–	1	–
=	ALG Mohamed Maghraoui	1	–	–	1	–
=	ALG Noureddine Drioueche	1	–	–	1	–
=	LBY Omar Daoud	1	1	–	–	–
=	ALG Mohamed Derrag	1	1	–	–	–
=	ALG Boubeker Athmani	1	1	–	–	–
=	ALG Faouzi Chaouchi	1	1	–	–	–
=	MLI Idrissa Coulibaly	1	1	–	–	–
=	ALG Nouri Ouznadji	1	–	–	1	–
=	MLI Demba Barry	1	–	–	1	–
=	ALG Tayeb Maroci	1	–	–	1	–
=	ALG Mohamed Rabie Meftah	1	1	–	–	–
=	ALG Mohamed Seguer	1	1	–	–	–
=	ALG Idriss Ech-Chergui	1	1	–	–	–
=	ALG Essaïd Belkalem	1	1	–	–	–
=	NGA Izu Azuka	1	1	–	–	–
=	ALG Mohamed Khoutir Ziti	1	1	–	–	–
=	ALG Salim Hanifi	1	–	–	1	–
=	ALG Billel Mebarki	1	–	–	1	–
=	ALG Koceila Berchiche	1	–	–	1	–
=	ALG Mokrane Baïleche	1	1	–	–	–
=	ALG Juba Oukaci	1	–	–	1	–
=	ALG Kouceila Boualia	1	–	–	1	–
=	ALG Ahmed Kerroum	1	–	–	1	–
=	ALG Ammar El Orfi	1	–	–	1	–
=	MLI Yacouba Doumbia	1	–	–	1	–
=	ALG Salim Boukhanchouche	1	1	–	–	–
=	ALG Mustapha Alili	1	1	–	–	–
=	BUR Lamine Ouattara	1	1	–	–	–
=	ALG Mohamed Reda Boumechra	1	1	–	–	–
=	ALG Moussa Benzaid	1	1	–	–	–
=	ALG Massinissa Nait Salem	1	1	–	–	–
=	ALG Adem Redjem	1	1	–	–	–
=	ALG Rezki Maghrici	1	–	–	–	1
=	ALG Ryad Boudebouz	1	1	–	–	–
=	ALG Oualid Malki	1	1	–	–	–
=	Own goals	8	2	1	5	0
Total		278	165	27	85	1

=== Hat trick ===
N	Date	Player	Match	Score	Time of goals	Competition
1	25 April 1990	ALG Nacer Bouiche	ASKO Kara – JS Kabylie	0–4	13', 35', 65'	Champions League
2	6 May 2000	ALG Fawzi Moussouni	JS Kabylie – TP Mazembe	5–0	19', 50', 90'	CAF Cup
3	28 April 2002	ALG Yacine Bezzaz	JS Kabylie – ASC Ndiambour	6–3	15', 35', 85'	CAF Cup
4	3 March 2006	ALG Hamza Yacef	JS Kabylie – Al-Ittihad Tripoli	4–0	17', 57', 63'	Champions League

=== Brace ===
N	Date	Player	Match	Score	Competition
1	11 September 1981	ALG Ali Belahcène	JS Kabylie – Dynamos Harare	3–0	Champions League
2	27 November 1981	ALG Lyes Bahbouh	JS Kabylie – AS Vita Club	4–0	Champions League
3	4 July 1986	ALG Nacer Bouiche	JS Kabylie – ES Tunis	2–1	Champions League
4	8 April 1990	ALG Nacer Bouiche	JS Kabylie – ASKO Kara	6–0	Champions League
5	8 April 1990	ALG Hakim Medane	JS Kabylie – ASKO Kara	6–0	Champions League
6	23 September 1990	ALG Youcef Ladjadj	JS Kabylie – AFC Leopards	3–0	Champions League
7	12 March 1993	ALG Tahar Benkaci	JS Kabylie – ASC SNIM	8–1	Cup Winners' Cup
8	8 September 1995	ALG Tarek Hadj Adlane	JS Kabylie – Hearts of Oak	3–1	Cup Winners' Cup
9	8 November 2002	ALG Hamid Berguiga	JS Kabylie – Tonnerre Yaoundé	4–0	CAF Cup
10	2 April 2006	ALG Hamid Berguiga	JS Kabylie – Zanaco FC	3–0	Champions League
11	21 April 2006	ALG Hamza Yacef	JS Kabylie – Raja Casablanca	3–1	Champions League
12	27 January 2007	ALG Youcef Saïbi	JS Kabylie – CF Os Balantas	3–1	Champions League
13	10 February 2007	MLI Cheick Oumar Dabo	CF Os Balantas – JS Kabylie	1–2	Champions League
14	6 July 2007	MLI Cheick Oumar Dabo	JS Kabylie – FAR Rabat	2–0	Champions League
15	21 March 2008	ALG Nabil Hemani	JS Kabylie – Ashanti Gold SC	3–0	Champions League
16	2 April 2011	ALG Chemseddine Nessakh	Tevragh-Zeina – JS Kabylie	1–2	CAF Confederation Cup
17	6 May 2011	ALG Saad Tedjar	JS Kabylie – Missile FC	3–0	CAF Confederation Cup
18	19 February 2017	ALG Mohamed Boulaouidet	JS Kabylie – Monrovia Club Breweries	4–0	CAF Confederation Cup
19	14 September 2019	ALG Hamza Banouh	JS Kabylie – Horoya Conakry	2–0	Champions League
20	27 June 2021	ALG Zakaria Boulahia	JS Kabylie – Coton Sport FC	3–0	CAF Confederation Cup
21	24 October 2021	ALG Ali Haroun	JS Kabylie – FAR Rabat	2–1	CAF Confederation Cup
22	28 September 2025	ALG Lahlou Akhrib	JS Kabylie – Bibiani Gold Stars FC	5–0	Champions League
23	25 October 2025	ALG Lahlou Akhrib	JS Kabylie – US Monastir	2–1	Champions League
