= 2005 CAF Super Cup =

Enyimba	Hearts of Oak
(Nigeria)	(Ghana)
2	0
- (After extra time)
- Date: 20 February 2005
- Venue: Aba Stadium, Aba

The 2005 CAF Super Cup was the 13th CAF Super Cup, an annual football match organized by the Confederation of African Football (CAF), between the winners of the previous season's CAF Champions League and CAF Confederation Cup competitions. The match was contested by 2004 CAF Champions League winners, Enyimba, and 2004 CAF Confederation Cup winners, Hearts of Oak, at the Aba Stadium in Aba, Nigeria, on 20 February 2005.

After the regular 90 minutes ended in a 0–0 draw, Nigerian side Enyimba won the match 2–0 in extra time. This was the second consecutive title for Enyimba.

== Teams ==
Team	Qualification	Previous participation (bold indicates winners)
(Nigeria) Enyimba	2004 CAF Champions League winner	**2004**
(Ghana) Hearts of Oak	2004 CAF Confederation Cup winner	**2001**

== Match details ==
20 February 2005

Enyimba (Nigeria)	2 – 0 (a.e.t.)	(Ghana) Hearts of Oak
Adegoke 97'; Ogunbiyi 109'	Report

Aba Stadium, Aba

**Enyimba**	**Hearts of Oak**

ENYIMBA:
GK	(Nigeria) Dele Aiyenugba
DF	(Nigeria) Musa Aliyu
DF	(Nigeria) Emeka Akueme
DF	(Nigeria) Nojim Raji
DF	(Nigeria) Yusuf Mohamed
MF	(Nigeria) Chidoze Johnson
MF	(Nigeria) Prince Olomu
MF	(Ghana) Joetex Asamoah Frimpong
MF	(Benin) Mouritala Ogunbiyi
FW	(Nigeria) Mutiu Adegoke
FW	(Nigeria) Odeh Ogar
Manager:
(Nigeria) Okey Omordi

HEARTS OF OAK:
GK	(Ghana) Mohamed Saani
DF	(Ghana) Acquaah Harrison
DF	(Ghana) Michael Donkor
DF	(Ghana) Wisdom Agblexo
DF	(Ghana) Yaw Amankwah Mireku
MF	(Ghana) Lawrence Adjei	Sent off (straight red)
MF	(Ghana) Joseph Tagoe
MF	(Ghana) Samed Abdul Awudu
MF	(Ghana) Francis Bossman
FW	(Ghana) Eric Nyarko
FW	(Ghana) Daniel Coleman
Manager:
(Ghana) Cecil Jones Attuquayefio

CAF Super Cup 2005

**Enyimba**
**Second Title**

== See also ==
- 2004 CAF Champions League
- 2004 CAF Confederation Cup
