= Osim =

Osim or OSIM may refer to:

- Amar Osim (born 1967), Bosnian football manager and son of Ivica
- Bob Osim (born 1980), Nigerian footballer
- Ivica Osim (1941–2022), Bosnian football manager and father of Amar
- Osim International, a Singapore-based electrical and household appliance company

== See also ==
- Usim (disambiguation)
