= Ervin Boban =

Croatian footballer

Personal information
- Full name: Ervin Boban
- Date of birth: 17 March 1965 (age 61)
- Place of birth: Split, Croatia
- Position: Forward

Youth career
- 1976–1984: Split

Senior career*
Years	Team	Apps	(Gls)
1984–1989	Split		(24)
1989–1995	Johor		(83)
1996	Woodlands Wellington		
?	Uskok		
–2002	NK Poljičanin Srinjine		

Managerial career
- 2001–2003: Split (u-12 head coach)
- 2003–2005: Split (u-13 head coach)
- 2006–2008: Split (u-14 head coach)
- 2009–2012: Split (u-15 head coach)
- 2014: Split (u-16 head coach)
- 2015–2018: Johor Darul Ta'zim III (u-21 head coach)
- 2018–2019: Johor Darul Ta'zim II
- 2021–: Ittihad Kalba FC (youth coach)
- * Club domestic league appearances and goals

Ervin Boban (born 17 March 1965 in Split) is a former Croatian professional football player, who is currently a coach for feeder club Johor Darul Ta'zim II. He started his career in professional football and coaching in his home town club, RNK Split.

Boban was one of Malaysia's top foreign footballers from the late 1980s through the 1990s. He is remembered as a living legend by local football fans. He was first introduced to Malaysian football in 1989. At that time he represented Johor FA, which was one of the competitive teams in the semi-pro era.

== Playing career ==
Ervin Boban started his career in 1976, when he was selected for Split's youth team. After eight years on the youth team, he was promoted to the senior team.

Boban joined Johor FA in April 1989, after which the team underwent a major and expensive overhaul. Johor FA won the Malaysia Cup championship for the first time in 1985 and was the runner-up in 1986, when it lost 1–6 to Selangor FA, led by Supermokh (Mokhtar Dahari). The team only qualified for the quarterfinals of the Malaysia Cup in 1987 and 1988.

The Johor Football Association invested RM1.6 million, a huge sum at the time, to obtain three players and one coach from Yugoslavia: Ervin Boban (attacker), Jeremez Jure (defense), Mate Borovac (midfielder), and Marin Kovacic (coach). This was the first time Johor FA had acquired foreign players. Boban was known for his speed and height, especially when playing at the Larkin Stadium.

After poor performances by Jeremez and Boravac in the 1989 season, Johor FA decided to retain Boban and sign two new strikers who played for the Australian national team: Alistair Edwards and Abbas Saad. Edwards and Saad were former youth team players who had been coached by Michael Urukalo in Australia.

This trio's combined talents caused difficulties for their opponents when trying to decide how to defend against their attacks. In 1990, Boban rejected an offer from the Division Two Austrian club, Klangerfurt FC, because he wanted to focus on the Johor FA team, and he was comfortable with the style of play in Liga Malaysia (the Malaysian League). In 1991, Boban helped Johor FA win the League Cup Division One and the Malaysia Cup Final 1991 saw Johor FA beat Selangor FA, 3-1, Boban having scored the three goals. The Johor manager at the time was Datuk Suleiman Mohammed Noor.

However, in 1993, Abbas Saad and Alistair Edwards chose to play for the Singapore Division Two club. Edwards had previously played for Singapore in 1990. Hasnim Haron from Singapore FA, and Darren Stewart (Australia), replaced Saad and Edwards. Boban also trained with players such as Marco Bilić, Michael Urukalo and Wan Jamak Wan Hassan, then coach of the Malaysia national football team. Among the players who have played with Boban on Johor FA are: Salehan Mohamed Som, Hassan Miskam, The Professor Nasir Yusof, Ramlan Rashid, Anuar Abu Bakar, Salim Sulaiman, Fadzli Ahmad, Nasir Sazali, Sani Usman, Khalid Shahdan, Nazaruddin Atan, Aidel Mohamed Nor, and Nizaruddin Kadir.

After seven seasons with the Johor FA - from 1989 to 1995 - Boban chose to join the Singapore Professional League (S-League), which was founded in 1996. He joined Woodlands Wellington FC (WWFC). WWFC was the only Premier League club not absorbed into the Singapore S-League in 1996.

In 1996, WWFC was sponsored by Bandai (Hong Kong) Company Limited, which was then known as a manufacturer of plastic toys (like Power Rangers) and video games for Sega and Game Boy). Bandai provided lucrative sponsorships totaling $360,000 to WWFC allowing R. Vengadasalam to sign big name players in the Malaysian League like Jan Janostak (Kedah FA), Joe Caleta (Perak FA) and Boban. WWFC's 1996 lineup also included: the late Borhan Abu Samah, Tamil Marren, Zakaria Awang, and Croatian goalkeeper Sandro Radun. The presence of star players attracted tens of thousands of spectators during the early years of the establishment of the S-League.

In April 1996, WWFC played against Tiong Bahru United FC in front of 22,000 spectators at the Stadium of Singapore that ended in a draw, 2-2. Boban also excelled in a meeting with Geylang United FC scoring on goalkeeper David Lee in front of 30,000 spectators, leading WWFC to a 1-0 win.

In the 1996 Final Resistance Tiger Beer Series Geylang United FC and WWFC met in front of 30,000 people; Gaylang United FC was victorious.

Boban retired from professional football in 2002, after a knee injury.

== Coaching career ==
After Boban retired, he received his UEFA A Coaching license and coached his home town club Split. During his 13 years coaching in Split, he managed to become Head Coach for U12, U14, and U16.

In June 2014, Boban returned to Malaysia, where he had played striker for nearly seven seasons, at the personal invitation of the Head of State, Prince of Johor. He was inducted into a local Malaysian Hall of Fame, the second footballer to receive the honour.

In late 2014, HRH Tunku Ismail Sultan Ibrahim, Johor FA's Chairman, hired Boban as its head coach for the 2015 Malaysian President's Cup.
