= Mutiu =

Mutiu is both a given name and a surname. Notable people with the name include:

- Mutiu Adegoke (born 1984), Nigerian footballer
- Mutiu Adepoju (born 1970), Nigerian footballer
- Vlad Muțiu (born 1995), Romanian footballer
