= Walid Regragui =

French-Moroccan footballer and manager (born 1975)

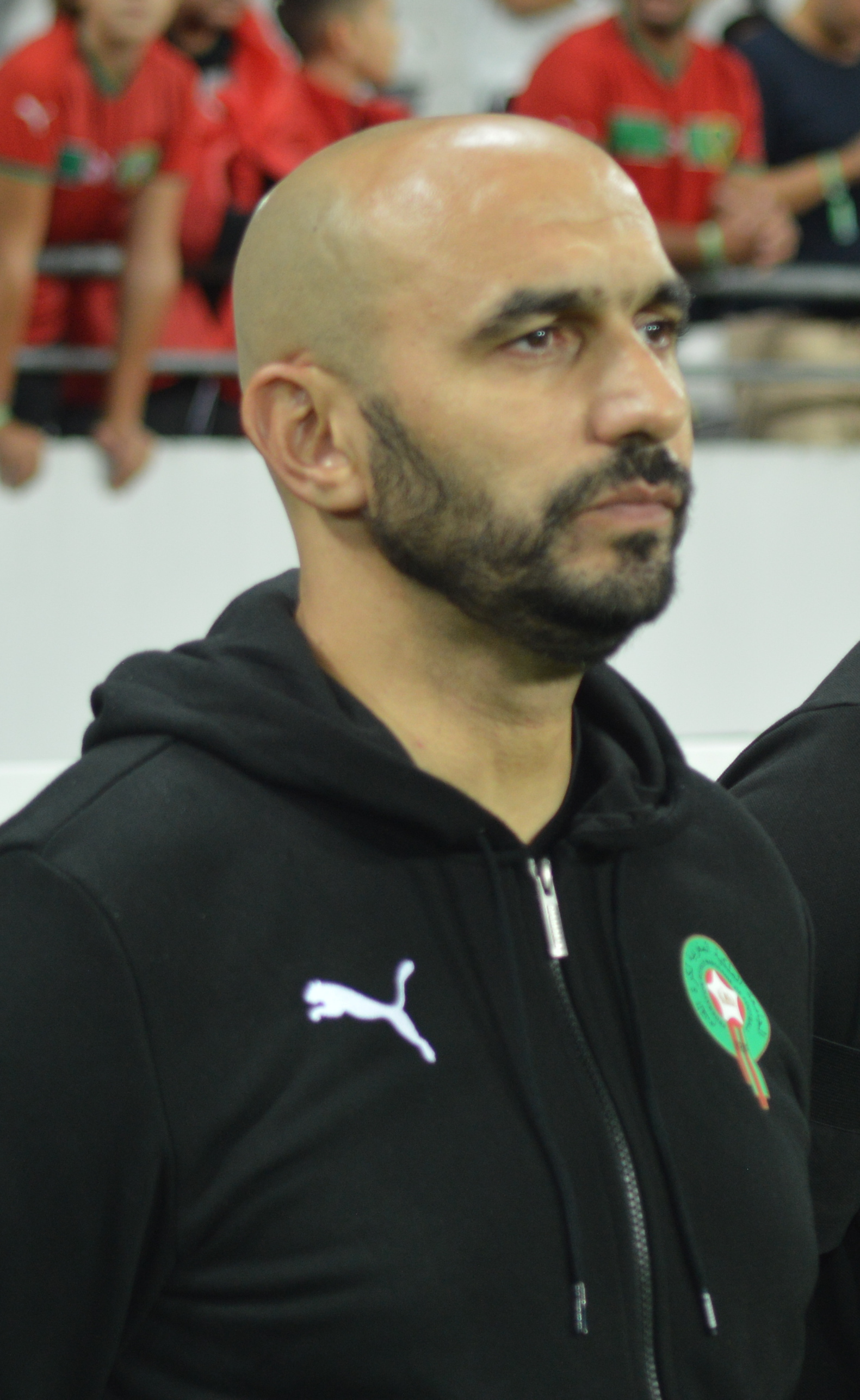
- Regragui with Morocco in 2023

Personal information
- Full name: Hoalid Regragui
- Date of birth: 23 September 1975 (age 51)
- Place of birth: Corbeil-Essonnes, Essonne, France
- Height: 1.78 m (5 ft 10 in)
- Position: Right-back

Youth career
- Corbeil-Essonnes

Senior career*
Years	Team	Apps	(Gls)
1998–1999	Racing Paris	17	(3)
1999–2001	Toulouse	37	(3)
2001–2004	Ajaccio	72	(3)
2004–2006	Racing Santander	25	(0)
2007	Dijon	10	(0)
2007–2009	Grenoble	39	(0)
2009–2010	Moghreb Tétouan		
2010–2012	Fleury 91		
Total		200	(9)

International career
2001–2009	Morocco	44	(0)

Managerial career
- 2014–2020: FUS
- 2020: Al-Duhail
- 2021–2022: Wydad AC
- 2022–2026: Morocco
Medal record
Men's football
Representing Morocco (as player)
Africa Cup of Nations
Runner-up	2004
Representing Morocco (as manager)
Winner	2025
- * Club domestic league appearances and goals

Hoalid Regragui (born 23 September 1975), known as Walid Regragui (Berber languages: ⵡⴰⵍⵉⴷ ⵔⴻⴳⵔⴰⴳⵉ, Arabic: وليد الركراكي), is a professional football manager and former player who played at right-back. He was most recently the head coach of the Morocco national team.

Born in France, he represented the Morocco national team as a player. He spent most of his club career in France, with spells in Spain and Morocco. As a coach, he led FUS Rabat and Wydad AC, winning the African Champions League in 2022 and the Moroccan league twice. He also managed Al Duhail in Qatar, winning the league. With Morocco, he led them to the semi-finals of the 2022 FIFA World Cup, making history as the first team from Africa and the Arab world to reach this stage. He then led Morocco as they qualified for the 2026 FIFA World Cup and won the 2025 Africa Cup of Nations on home soil before resigning.

== Early life ==
Hoalid Regragui was born on 23 September 1975 in Corbeil-Essonnes, Essonne.

== Playing career ==
Regragui was a full international for Morocco. Clubs he played for include Toulouse, AC Ajaccio, Grenoble and Racing Santander. In the summer of 2009, he moved from Grenoble to Moroccan club Moghreb Tétouan.

Regragui played in the Moroccan squad that reached the final of the 2004 AFCON, losing 1–2 to Tunisia.

== Managerial career ==
=== Morocco ===
After retiring as a player, Regragui started his football coaching career as the assistant coach of Morocco's national team in September 2012.

=== FUS ===
On 8 May 2014, he landed a head coaching job with Fath Union Sport for the 2014–15 season. Following his league performances and Moroccan Throne Cup victory in 2014, he was named Mars d'Or Coach of the Year in March 2015.

On 22 January 2020, he left the club by mutual consent.

=== Wydad AC ===
On 10 August 2021, Regragui was appointed as the head coach of Botola side Wydad AC. The team went on to win the 2021–22 Botola in his first season. On 30 May 2022, he led Wydad AC to win its third CAF Champions League title, after beating defending champions Al Ahly in the final. He became only the second Moroccan manager to win the African Champions League, after Hussein Ammouta with Wydad in 2017. In December 2022, Regragui was nominated for the 2022 IFFHS World's Best Club Coach for his performance in the year in review with Wydad before becoming head coach of the Moroccan national team. He was subsequently adjudged the third best behind Carlo Ancelotti and Pep Guardiola.

=== Return to Morocco ===
On 31 August 2022, Regragui was appointed as the new head coach for the Morocco national team after the dismissal of former head coach Vahid Halilhodžić. On 21 September 2022, Regragui coached his first friendly game, which ended in a 1–0 victory against Madagascar.

In the 2022 FIFA World Cup, he led Morocco to the knockout stage for the first time since 1986, and to the quarter finals after beating Spain on penalties in the round of 16, making Morocco the fourth African nation and the first Arab nation to qualify for this stage in a World Cup competition. Regragui himself is the first African manager, and first Arab manager to reach this stage. Morocco would later beat favourite Portugal 1–0 and move on to the semi-finals, not only another first for Morocco, but also making them the first African team, and first Arab team to qualify for the semi-finals. However, they lost to France in the semi-final 2–0 on 14 December. Afterward, they finished in fourth place with a 2–1 loss against Croatia. After the World Cup concluded, Regragui was nominated for the 2022 IFFHS World's Best National Coach award. He placed third behind World Cup winning coach Lionel Scaloni and runner-up Didier Deschamps.

Between June 2024 and December 2025, Morocco enjoyed a strong run of form under Regragui, recording a streak of 19 consecutive victories in international matches, one of the longest winning runs for a national team manager. During this period, he also led Morocco to qualification for the 2026 FIFA World Cup, becoming the first African nation to secure a place at the tournament.

At the 2025 Africa Cup of Nations, hosted on home soil, he guided Morocco to the final, where they were awarded a 0–3 win to Senegal after the Senegalese team forfeited in the final. On 5 March 2026, he resigned from his role as head coach of the national team.

== Managerial statistics ==
As of match played 18 January 2026

Team	From	To	Record				
Team	From	To	G	W	D	L	Win %
FUS	1 June 2014	22 January 2020	186	75	63	48	40.32
Al-Duhail	22 January 2020	3 October 2020	20	13	1	6	65.00
Wydad AC	10 August 2021	29 July 2022	48	32	8	8	66.67
Morocco	31 August 2022	5 March 2026	49	37	8	4	75.51
Total			303	157	80	66	51.82

== Honours ==
=== Player ===
Ajaccio

- Ligue 2: 2001–02

Morocco

- Africa Cup of Nations runner-up: 2004

Individual

- Africa Cup of Nations Team of the Tournament: 2004

=== Manager ===
FUS

- Botola Pro: 2015–16
- Moroccan Throne Cup: 2013–14; runner-up: 2014–15

Al-Duhail

- Qatar Stars League: 2019–20

Wydad AC

- Botola Pro: 2021–22
- CAF Champions League: 2021–22
- Moroccan Throne Cup runner-up: 2020–21

Morocco

- Africa Cup of Nations: 2025
- FIFA World Cup fourth place: 2022

Individual

- "Mars d'Or" Moroccan Coach of the Year: 2014
- Botola Pro Best Coach of the Season: 2014–15, 2015–16, 2021–22
- Sky News Best Arab coach in the world: 2022
- "Africa d'Or" African Coach of the Year: 2023
- CAF Coach of the Year: 2023

Order

- Officer of the Order of National Merit (Morocco): 2004
- Commander of the Order of National Merit (Morocco): 2016
- Commander of the Order of the Throne (Morocco): 2022
