= 2011 CAF Super Cup =

TP Mazembe	FUS Rabat
(Democratic Republic of the Congo)	(Morocco)
0	0
- TP Mazembe won 9–8 on penalties
- Date: 29 January 2011
- Venue: Stade de la Kenya, Lubumbashi

The 2011 CAF Super Cup (also known as the 2011 Orange CAF Super Cup for sponsorship reasons) was the 19th CAF Super Cup, an annual football match in Africa organized by the Confederation of African Football (CAF), between the winners of the previous season's two CAF club competitions, the CAF Champions League and the CAF Confederation Cup. The match was contested between TP Mazembe of the Democratic Republic of the Congo, the winner of the 2010 CAF Champions League, and FUS Rabat of Morocco, the winner of the 2010 CAF Confederation Cup. TP Mazembe won the trophy after beating FUS Rabat 9–8 in the penalty shoot-out, with the game ending 0–0.

The hosts of the 2015 and 2017 Africa Cup of Nations tournaments were announced at the match.

== Teams ==
Team	Qualification	Previous participation (bold indicates winners)
(Democratic Republic of the Congo) TP Mazembe	2010 CAF Champions League winner	**2010**
(Morocco) FUS Rabat	2010 CAF Confederation Cup winner	None

== Rules ==
The CAF Super Cup is played over one match, hosted by the winner of the CAF Champions League. Since 2011, the regulations have been changed such that in case of a draw the two teams would directly move to post match penalties (no extra time is played).

== Match details ==
29 January 2011
15:30 UTC+02:00

TP Mazembe (Democratic Republic of the Congo)	0 – 0	(Morocco) FUS Rabat
	Report
Penalties
	9 – 8

Stade de la Kenya, Lubumbashi
