= 1996 CAF Super Cup =

Orlando Pirates	Kabylie
(South Africa)	(Algeria)
1	0
- Date: 2 March 1996
- City: Cape Town
- Referee: (Mauritius) Lim Kee Chong

The 1996 CAF Super Cup was the fourth CAF Super Cup, an annual football match in Africa organized by the Confederation of African Football (CAF), between the 1995 African Cup of Champions Clubs Orlando Pirates against the 1995 African Cup Winners' Cup Kabylie.

The match took place on 2 March 1996, in Cape Town, South Africa, between the South African club Orlando Pirates and the Algerian club Kabylie.

== Teams ==
Team	Qualification	Previous participation (bold indicates winners)
(South Africa) Orlando Pirates	1995 African Cup of Champions Clubs winner	None
(Algeria) Kabylie	1995 African Cup Winners' Cup winner	**1982**

== Match details ==
2 March 1996

Orlando Pirates	1–0	Kabylie
	Report

Referee: (Mauritius) Lim Kee Chong

== See also ==
- Tournament of Fraternity 1982
