= Prince Olomu =

Nigerian footballer

Personal information
- Full name: Prince Wilson Olomu
- Date of birth: 24 December 1986 (age 39)
- Place of birth: Maiduguri, Nigeria
- Height: 1.76 m (5 ft 9 in)
- Position: Attacking midfielder

Team information
- Current team: Maritzburg United
- Number: 12

Senior career*
Years	Team	Apps	(Gls)
- El-Kanemi Warriors
–2006	Enyimba		
2006–2009	Free State Stars		
2009–2011	Bloemfontein Celtic	50	(14)
2011–2012	Maritzburg United	24	(2)
2012–2013	Royal Eagles	11	(2)
- * Club domestic league appearances and goals as of 10 November 2022

Prince Wilson Olomu (born 24 December 1986, in Maiduguri) is a Nigerian football midfielder who played in the South African Premier Soccer League. Olomu was the second leading goal scorer in the PSL with 13 goals for the 2009-10 season.
