= Wisdom Agblexo =

Ghanaian footballer

Wiz Agblexo
Personal information
- Full name: Wisdom Agblexo
- Date of birth: 11 November 1986 (age 39)
- Place of birth: Tema, Ghana
- Height: 1.86 m (6 ft 1 in)
- Position: Striker

Team information
- Current team: Sime Darby F.C. '
- Number: 10

Youth career
- FC Young Hearts Tema
- Power F.C.

Senior career*
Years	Team	Apps	(Gls)
2004–2005	Hearts of Oak	23	(12)
2006	Heart of Lions	30	(9)
2007–2008	El-Olympi	42	(22)
2008–2009	Lierse S.K.	27	(6)
2009–2012	Wadi Degla	68	(42)
2012–2013	Ansar	19	(11)
2014 –2016	Sime Darby F.C.	37	(18)

International career^{‡}
2007–2012	67	SENIOR	(15)
- * Club domestic league appearances and goals as of 5 December 2013 ‡ National team caps and goals as of 5 December 2013

Wisdom Agblexo (born 11 November 1986, in Tema) is a Ghanaian footballer, playing for Sime Darby F.C. in Malaysia.

== Career ==
Agblexo left after one and a half-year El-Olympi, he signed on 4 July 2008 a three years contract with Lierse S.K. He has moved from his club Lierse S.K. to help Lierse S.K's sister club Wadi Degla Sporting Club fight for promotion to Egyptian Premiership.
