= 2004 CAF Super Cup =

Enyimba	ES Sahel
(Nigeria)	(Tunisia)
1	0
- Date: 22 February 2004
- Venue: Aba Stadium, Aba
- Referee: Divine Evehe (Cameroon)
- Attendance: 20,000

The 2004 CAF Super Cup was the 12th CAF Super Cup, an annual football match organized by the Confederation of African Football (CAF), between the winners of the previous season's CAF Champions League and CAF Confederation Cup competitions. The match was contested by 2003 CAF Champions League winners, Enyimba, and 2003 African Cup Winners' Cup winners, ES Sahel, at the Aba Stadium in Aba, Nigeria, on 22 February 2004.

The game finished 1–0 to Enyimba, securing the first Super Cup title for a club from Nigeria.

== Teams ==
Team	Qualification	Previous participation (bold indicates winners)
(Nigeria) Enyimba	2003 CAF Champions League winner	None
(Tunisia) ES Sahel	2003 African Cup Winners' Cup winner	**1998**

== Match details ==
22 February 2004

Enyimba (Nigeria)	1 – 0	(Tunisia) ES Sahel
Osim 20'; Nwaneri (red card) 90'	Report

Aba Stadium, Aba
Attendance: 20,000
Referee: Divine Evehe (Cameroon)

**Enyimba**	**Étoile du Sahel**

ENYIMBA:
GK	(Nigeria) Dele Aiyenugba
DF	(Nigeria) Yusuf Mohamed
MF	(Nigeria) Bob Osim
DF	(Nigeria) Obinna Nwaneri	Sent off (straight red)
DF	(Nigeria) Uga Okpara
MF	(Nigeria) Jérôme Ezoba
MF	(Nigeria) Emeka Nwanna
MF	(Nigeria) Ndidi Anumnu
MF	(Nigeria) Onyekachi Okonkwo
DF	(Nigeria) Ajibade Omolade
FW	(Nigeria) Mouritala Ogunbiyi
Manager:
(Australia) Michael Urukalo

ES SAHEL:
GK	(Tunisia) Aymen Mathlouthi
DF	(Tunisia) Kais Zouaghi
DF	(Tunisia) Saïf Ghezal
DF	(Tunisia) Lotfi Sellemi
DF	(Tunisia) Saber Ben Frej
MF	(Tunisia) Ahmed Hammi
MF	(Ivory Coast) Ibrahima Koné
MF	(Tunisia) Zoubeir Baya
MF	(Tunisia) Imed Mhedhebi
FW	(Nigeria) Ogochukwu Obiakor	(substituted off) 70'
FW	(Nigeria) Emeka Opara
Substitutes:
FW	(Tunisia) Aymen Bouchhioua	(substituted on) 70'
Manager:
(France) Bernard Simondi

CAF Super Cup 2004

**Enyimba**
**First Title**

== See also ==
- 2003 CAF Champions League
- 2003 African Cup Winners' Cup
