= Usim =

Usim or USIM may refer to:

- Universiti Sains Islam Malaysia, public university in Malaysia
- Universal Subscriber Identity Module, a software application for UMTS mobile telephony, which runs on a UICC which is inserted in a 3G mobile phone
- Nduka Usim (born 1985), Azerbaijani footballer
