= 2025 CAF Super Cup =

TotalEnergies CAF Super Cup Cairo 2025
- Match poster
| Pyramids | RS Berkane |
| (Egypt) | (Morocco) |
| 1 | 0 |
- Date: 18 October 2025
- Venue: 30 June Stadium, Cairo, Egypt
- Man of the Match: Mohamed Chibi (Pyramids FC)
- Referee: Mahmood Ismail (Sudan)
- Weather: Clear; 23 °C (73 °F); 46% humidity

The 2025 CAF Super Cup,TotalEnergies CAF Super Cup Cairo 2025 for sponsorship reasons, was the 34th CAF Super Cup, an annual football match in Africa organized by the Confederation of African Football (CAF), between the winners of the previous season's two CAF club competitions, the CAF Champions League and the CAF Confederation Cup.

The match was played between the 2024–25 CAF Champions League winners, Pyramids, from Egypt, and the 2024–25 CAF Confederation Cup winners, RS Berkane, from Morocco, on 18 October 2025 at the 30 June Stadium in Cairo, Egypt.

Pyramids FC won the match 1–0, to secure their First ever CAF Super Cup title. The match was the Second continental encounter between the two clubs, and the First in a Super Cup.

The match set numerous records. This was Pyramids' First title, which came against opponent from Morocco. Pyramids managed to win The 2024–25 CAF Champions League and 2025 CAF Super Cup. Additionally, Pyramids became the Third Egyptian Team to win the CAF Super Cup. Meanwhile, RS Berkane lost their second CAF Super Cup, 2021 and 2025 against Al Ahly and Pyramids respectively.

== Teams ==
| Team | Zone | Qualification | Previous participation (bold indicates winners) |
|---|---|---|---|
| (Egypt) Pyramids | UNAF (North Africa) | 2024–25 CAF Champions League winners | 0 |
| (Morocco) RS Berkane | UNAF (North Africa) | 2024–25 CAF Confederation Cup winners | 2 (2021, **2022**) |

== Format ==
The CAF Super Cup was played as a single match at a neutral venue, with the CAF Champions League winners designated as the "home" team for administrative purposes. If the score is tied at the end of regulation, extra time was not played, and the penalty shoot-out was used to determine the winner (CAF Champions League Regulations XXVII and CAF Confederation Cup Regulations XXV).

== Venue ==
| 2025 CAF Super Cup is located in Egypt | City | Stadium |
|---|---|---|
| 2025 CAF Super Cup is located in Egypt | Cairo | 30 June Stadium |
| 2025 CAF Super Cup is located in Egypt | **Capacity: 30,000** | |

== Match ==
18 October 2025
20:00 UTC+2

| Pyramids (Egypt) | 1–0 | (Morocco) RS Berkane |
|---|---|---|
| Mayele 75' |

30 June Stadium, Cairo
Referee: Mahmood Ismail (Sudan)

| **Pyramids FC** | **RS Berkane** |

| GK | 1 | (Egypt) Ahmed El Shenawy (c) |
| RB | 15 | (Morocco) Mohamed Chibi | (yellow card) 90+3' |
| CB | 4 | (Egypt) Ahmed Samy |
| CB | 3 | (Egypt) Mahmoud Marei | (yellow card) 70' |
| LB | 21 | (Egypt) Mohamed Hamdy |
| CM | 8 | (Burkina Faso) Ibrahim Blati Toure | (yellow card) 78' | (substituted off) 89' |
| CM | 14 | (Egypt) Mohanad Lasheen |
| CM | 18 | (Morocco) Walid El Karti | (yellow card) 78' |
| RW | 11 | (Egypt) Mostafa Fathi | | (substituted off) 86' |
| LW | 23 | (Egypt) Ahmed Atef | | (substituted off) 90' |
| CF | 9 | (Democratic Republic of the Congo) Fiston Mayele |
Substitutes:
| GK | 28 | (Egypt) Mahmoud Gad |
| DF | 5 | (Egypt) Ali Gabr | | (substituted on) 89' |
| MF | 12 | (Egypt) Ahmed Tawfik |
| MF | 40 | (Egypt) Mohamed Reda |
| FW | 32 | (Brazil) Ewerton | | (substituted on) 90' |
| FW | 17 | (Egypt) Zalaka | | (substituted on) 89' |
| FW | 19 | (Egypt) Marwan Hamdi |
| FW | 20 | (Egypt) Abdel Rahman Magdy |
| FW | 30 | (Egypt) Mostafa Ziko |
Manager:
(Croatia) Krunoslav Jurčić

| GK | 1 | (Morocco) Munir Mohamedi (c) |
| RB | 20 | (Morocco) Haytam Manaout |
| CB | 27 | (Morocco) Ismaël Kandouss |
| CB | 13 | (Morocco) Abdelhak Assal |
| LB | 19 | (Morocco) Hamza El Moussaoui |
| CM | 8 | (Morocco) Ayoub Khairi |
| CM | 6 | (Senegal) Mamadou Lamine Camara | | (substituted off) 82' |
| CM | 29 | (France) Zinédine Machach | (substituted off) 60' |
| RW | 11 | (Morocco) Youssef Mehri | | (substituted off) 90' |
| LW | 23 | (France) Mounir Chouiar | | (substituted off) 82' |
| CF | 28 | (Senegal) Paul Bassène | (yellow card) 29' |
Substitutes:
| GK | 12 | (Morocco) Mehdi Miftah |
| DF | 4 | (Tunisia) Oussama Haddadi |
| DF | 3 | (Morocco) Mohamed Aymen Sadil |
| MF | 14 | (France) Rayane Aabid | | (substituted on) 82' |
| MF | 10 | (Morocco) Mohamed El Morabit | | (substituted on) 90' |
| MF | 35 | (Morocco) Reda Hajji |
| FW | 21 | (Morocco) Amine Azri |
| FW | 24 | (Morocco) Youness El Kaabi | | (substituted on) 82' |
| FW | 18 | (Morocco) Imad El Riahi | | (substituted on) 60' |
Manager:
(Tunisia) Moïn Chaabani

Man of the Match:
Mohamed Chibi (Pyramids FC)

Assistant referees:
Liban Abdourazak (Djibouti)
Stephen Yiembe (Kenya)
Fourth official:
Abdel-Aziz Bouh (Mauritania)
Video assistant referee:
Daniel Laryea (Ghana)
Assistant video assistant referees:
Abongile Tom (South Africa)
Djibril Camara (Senegal)

**Match rules**
- 90 minutes.
- Penalty shoot-out if scores level.
- Nine named substitutes, of which up to five may be used. (Note: Each team was only given three opportunities to make substitutions, excluding substitutions made at half-time.)

== See also ==
- 2022 CAF Super Cup
- 2023 CAF Super Cup
- 2024 CAF Super Cup
