= Aymen Bouchhioua =

Tunisian footballer (born 1979)

Personal information
- Full name: Aymen Bouchhioua
- Date of birth: 24 August 1979 (age 47)
- Place of birth: Tripoli, Libya
- Height: 1.88 m (6 ft 2 in)
- Position: Forward

Senior career*
Years	Team	Apps	(Gls)
1995–1996	Espérance de Zarzis	12	(5)
1996–2002	Espérance de Tunis		
2002–2006	Étoile Sahel		
2006–2007	Zorya Luhansk	13	(5)
2008	FC Aarau	6	(0)

International career
- Tunisia U23
- * Club domestic league appearances and goals

Aymen Bouchhioua (born 24 August 1979) is a Tunisian former professional footballer who played as a forward.

== Career ==
Bouchhioua was born in Tripoli, Libya.

He was signed by FC Aarau on 4 February 2008. and was formerly on trial with SC Paderborn 07 in summer 2007.
