= Bob Osim =

Nigerian footballer

Personal information
- Full name: Robert Osim
- Date of birth: 15 July 1980 (age 46)
- Place of birth: Lagos, Nigeria
- Position: Defender

Senior career*
Years	Team	Apps	(Gls)
1994–1995	Calabar Rovers		
2002	Sunshine Stars F.C.		
2003	Iwuanyanwu Nationale		
2003	→ Enugu Rangers (loan)		
2004–2005	Enyimba International F.C.		
2006–2007	Heartland		
2008–2011	UNICEM Rovers F.C.		

International career
2002–2003	Nigeria	5	(0)

Managerial career
- 2019–?: Calabar Rovers
- * Club domestic league appearances and goals

Bob Osim, also written as Bob Usim, (born 15 July 1980, in Lagos, Nigeria) is a Nigerian football manager and former player, who played as a defender for various club sides in his home country and represented Nigeria at international level. In 2019 he coached Calabar Rovers in the second level Nigeria National League.

== Playing career ==
Osim played on loan from Iwuanyanwu Nationale for Enugu Rangers in the 2003 CAF Cup. He was named man of the match in the quarter final first leg 4–0 victory against Egyptian side Al Ahly. He was among a number of players who alleged Iwuanyanwu owed money for unpaid salaries in 2004, for the previous season. In February 2004, he was among 47 players signed by Enyimba International. Shortly after his arrival at the club, Osim scored the only goal in the 2004 CAF Super Cup, in which Enyimba defeated Étoile Sportive du Sahel, becoming the first team from Nigeria to win the competition.

== International career ==
Internationally Osim played for Nigeria. He made his first start for his nation in a 1–1 friendly match draw against Egypt at Lagos National Stadium in November 2002. Osim played the full 90 minutes of a May 2003 friendly match away against Jamaica, which finished 3–2 to the hosts. In July 2003 he was named in the squad for a friendly against Venezuela. At the end of that year, he was part of a pre-tournament 41-man camp in Portugal ahead of January's 2004 African Cup of Nations, although he wasn't part of the final 23-man squad. He was called up in 2006 for Nigeria's 2008 Africa Cup of Nations qualification match against Lesotho.

== Management career ==
Osim was announced as the head coach of Calabar Rovers in January 2019.
