= Mutiu Adegoke =

Nigerian football defender

Personal information
- Full name: Mutiu Adeleke Adegoke
- Date of birth: 10 February 1984 (age 42)
- Place of birth: Ibadan, Nigeria
- Height: 1.80 m (5 ft 11 in)
- Position: Defender

Team information
- Current team: Bayelsa United
- Number: 20

Senior career*
Years	Team	Apps	(Gls)
2004	Shooting Stars		
2005–2006	Enyimba International		
2007	ASEC Mimosas		
2008	Heartland F.C.		
2008–2009	FC Saint Eloi Lupopo		
2009	Lobi Stars		
2010–2011	Dolphins F.C.		
2011–2013	Shooting Stars		
2013–2015	Bayelsa United		
2015—2016	Sunshine United		
2016-	Giwa United		

International career
2005–2010	Nigeria	3	(0)
- * Club domestic league appearances and goals

Mutiu Adegoke (born 10 February 1984, in Nigeria) is a Nigerian football defender who is currently retired.

== Career ==
He began his career as a defender and played with ASEC Mimosas of Ivory Coast and FC Saint Eloi Lupopo in DR Congo, before returning to Nigeria to play for Dolphins.

== International career ==
Adegoke is former member of the Super Eagles and earned the call-up for his comeback on 12 February 2010 after three years absence.
