= 1995 African Cup Winners' Cup =

21st edition of the African Cup Winners' Cup

Tournament details
- Dates: February - 8 December 1995
- Teams: 28 (from 1 confederation)

Final positions
- Champions: (Algeria) JS Kabylie (1st title)
- Runners-up: (Nigeria) Julius Berger

Tournament statistics
- Matches played: 45
- Goals scored: 114 (2.53 per match)

The 1995 African Cup Winners' Cup football club tournament was won by Jeunesse Sportive de Kabylie in two-legged final victory against Julius Berger FC (now renamed to Bridge Boys FC). This was the twenty-first season that the tournament took place for the winners of each African country's domestic cup. Twenty-eight sides entered the competition, with KAC Marrakech and Horoya AC withdrawing before the 1st leg of the first round and Étoile du Congo withdrawing after the 1st leg of the first round. Another two teams withdrew during further stages of the competition; Wallidan before the 1st leg of the second round and AS Marsa before the 1st leg of the quarterfinals. No preliminary round took place during this season of the competition.

== First round ==
Team 1	Agg.	Team 2	1st leg	2nd leg
Vaal Professionals FC (South Africa)	3–4	(Tanzania) Young Africans	2–2	1–2
Matlama FC (Lesotho)	3–4	(Mauritius) Cadets Club	2–1	1–3
Blackpool FC (Zimbabwe)	5–1	(Réunion) US Saint-Andréenne	2–0	3–1
Township Rollers (Botswana)	3–5	(Zambia) Kabwe Warriors	2–1	1–4
Zumunta AC (Niger)	2–2 (a)	(Ivory Coast) Stade d'Abidjan	2–1	0–1
AS Nianan (Mali)	2–1	(Togo) Étoile Filante	0–1	2–0
Independente SC (Angola)	1–5	(Cameroon) Olympic Mvolyé	1–2	0–3
Vital'O FC (Burundi)	3–2	(Gabon) AS Mangasport	2–0	1–2
EPB (Republic of the Congo)	w/o	(Ghana) Hearts of Oak	1–3	—
Mbabane Highlanders (Eswatini)	1–2	(Mozambique) CD Maxaquene	0–0	1–2
Wallidan FC (The Gambia)	w/o	(Morocco) KAC Marrakesh	—	—
AS Marsa (Tunisia)	w/o	(Guinea) AS Cara	—	—
Al-Merrikh (Sudan)	bye			
JS Kabylie (Algeria)	bye			
Julius Berger (Nigeria)	bye			
DC Motema Pembe (Democratic Republic of the Congo)	bye			

== Second round ==
Team 1	Agg.	Team 2	1st leg	2nd leg
Blackpool FC (Zimbabwe)	3–1	(Zambia) Kabwe Warriors	0–0	3–1
Young Africans (Tanzania)	4–2	(Mauritius) Cadets Club	3–1	1–1
Julius Berger (Nigeria)	8–1	(Mali) AS Nianan	5–0	3–1
Olympic Mvolyé (Cameroon)	1–4	(Ghana) Hearts of Oak	1–0	0–4
DC Motema Pembe (Democratic Republic of the Congo)	2–1	(Burundi) Vital'O FC	2–0	0–1
Al-Merrikh (Sudan)	2–3	(Mozambique) CD Maxaquene	1–1	1–2
JS Kabylie (Algeria)	2–1	(Ivory Coast) Stade d'Abidjan	2–0	0–1
AS Marsa (Tunisia)	w/o	(The Gambia) Wallidan FC	—	—

== Quarter-finals ==
Team 1	Agg.	Team 2	1st leg	2nd leg
CD Maxaquene (Mozambique)	w/o	(Tunisia) AS Marsa	—	—
DC Motema Pembe (Democratic Republic of the Congo)	1–2	(Nigeria) Julius Berger	1–0	0–2
Blackpool FC (Zimbabwe)	4–2	(Tanzania) Young Africans	2–1	2–1
JS Kabylie (Algeria)	4–3	(Ghana) Hearts of Oak	3–1	1–2

== Semi-finals ==
Team 1	Agg.	Team 2	1st leg	2nd leg
Blackpool FC (Zimbabwe)	2–2 (a)	(Algeria) JS Kabylie	2–1	0–1
CD Maxaquene (Mozambique)	0–1	(Nigeria) Julius Berger	0–0	0–1

== Final ==
Team 1	Agg.	Team 2	1st leg	2nd leg
Julius Berger (Nigeria)	2–3	(Algeria) JS Kabylie	1–1	1–2

=== First leg ===
25 November 1995

Julius Berger (Nigeria)	1 – 1	(Algeria) JS Kabylie
Obo 88'		Menad 90+2'

Surulere National Stadium, Lagos

=== Second leg ===
8 December 1995

JS Kabylie (Algeria)	2 – 1	(Nigeria) Julius Berger
Menad 65'; Benchikha 80'		Obo 17'

Stade 5 Juillet 1962, Algiers
Attendance: 45,000
Referee: Becaye Magassa (Mali)

== Champion ==
African Cup Winners' Cup
1995 Winners

JS Kabylie
First Title
