= Michael Urukalo =

Serbian-born Australian football coach

Personal information
- Full name: Milorad Urukalo
- Place of birth: SFR Yugoslavia

Senior career*
Years	Team	Apps	(Gls)
- White City
- Avala

Managerial career
- 1988: Avala
- 1989: APIA Leichhardt
- 1991–1992: Johor
- 1993: Tyrwhitt Soccerites
- 1994: Perak
- 1994–1995: Heidelberg United
- 1997: Bulleen Inter Kings
- 1998: Nea Salamis
- 2001: Sydney Olympic (youth)
- 2004: Enyimba
- 2005: Sydney Olympic
- 2008–2009: Inter Lions
- * Club domestic league appearances and goals

Michael Urukalo, born Milorad Urukalo, is a Serbian-born Australian football (soccer) coach who has worked at several clubs in Africa, Asia and Australia.

Urukalo coached in Malaysia, Singapore Pro League, Kuwait National League and Guam Football Federation. He was also the first coach to achieve the Malaysian Double, winning both the Malaysian League and Malaysia Cup in 1991 with Johor.

He also had a brief stint with Enyimba of Nigeria, replacing Kadiri Ikhana and with whom he won the 2004 African Super Cup.
