= 2022 CAF Super Cup =

TotalEnergies CAF Super Cup 2022
- Match programme cover
Wydad AC	RS Berkane
(Morocco)	(Morocco)
0	2
- Date: 10 September 2022
- Venue: Prince Moulay Abdellah Stadium, Rabat
- Referee: Mustapha Ghorbal (Algeria)

The 2022 CAF Super Cup, known the TotalEnergies CAF Super Cup 2022 for sponsorship reasons, was the 31st CAF Super Cup, an annual football match in Africa organized by the Confederation of African Football (CAF), between the winners of the previous season's two CAF club competitions, the CAF Champions League and the CAF Confederation Cup.

The match was played between Wydad AC from Morocco, the 2021–22 CAF Champions League winners, and RS Berkane from Morocco, the 2021–22 CAF Confederation Cup winners.

This is the first-ever all-Moroccan CAF Super Cup, and the fourth that contested teams from the same country, after 1994, 1997 and 2008 editions.

RS Berkane won first title CAF Super Cup after defeated Wydad AC 2-0

== Teams ==
Team	Zone	Qualification	Previous participation (bold indicates winners)
(Morocco) Wydad AC	UNAF (North Africa)	2021–22 CAF Champions League winners	3 (1993, 2003, **2018**)
(Morocco) RS Berkane	UNAF (North Africa)	2021–22 CAF Confederation Cup winners	1 (2021)

== Venue ==
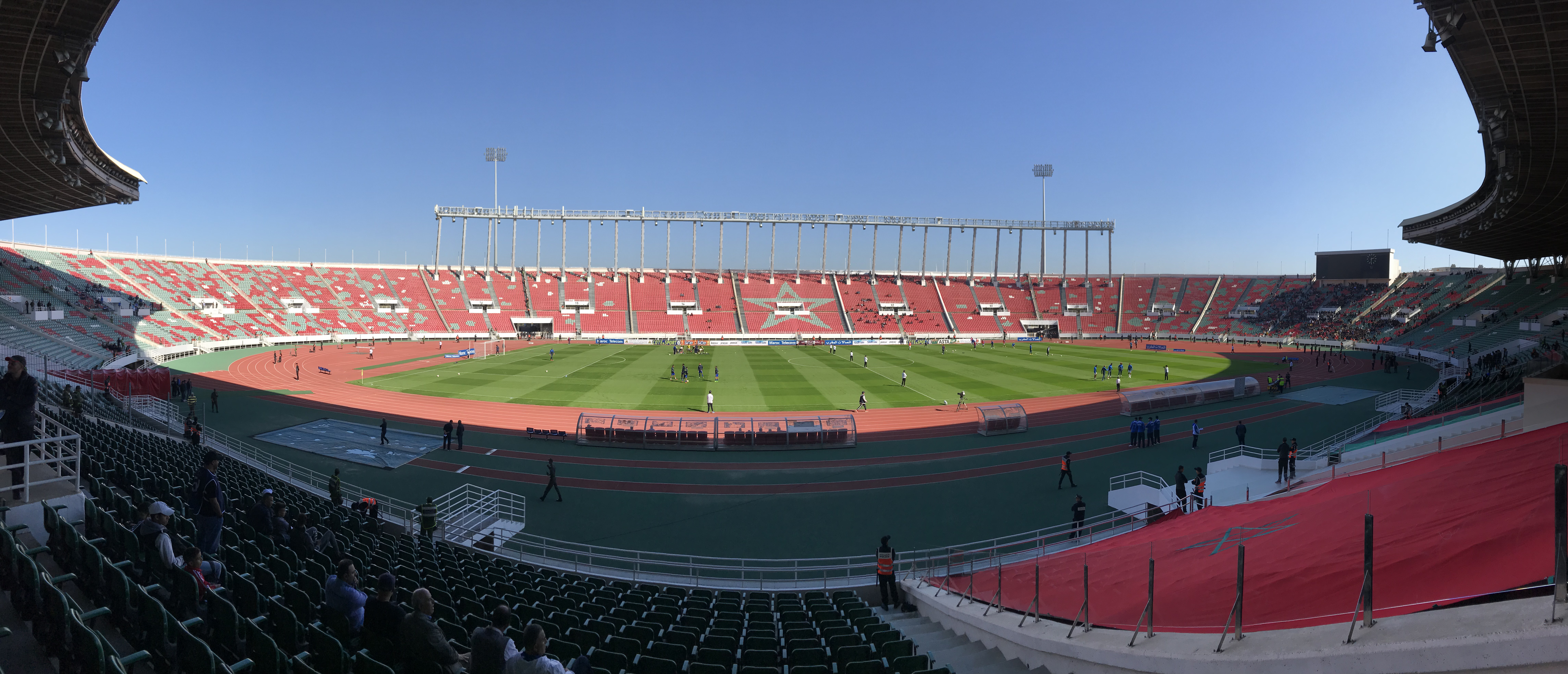
The Prince Moulay Abdellah Stadium in Rabat hosted the match.

The match was played in Prince Moulay Abdellah Stadium in Rabat, Morocco.

It was one of the three venues that hosted the 2022 Women's Africa Cup of Nations.

== Format ==
The CAF Super Cup is played as a single match at a neutral venue, with the CAF Champions League winners designated as the "home" team for administrative purposes. If the score is tied at the end of regulation, extra time will not be played, and the penalty shoot-out will be used to determine the winner (CAF Champions League Regulations XXVII and CAF Confederation Cup Regulations XXV).

== Match ==
10 September 2022
20:00 UTC+1

Wydad AC (Morocco)	0–2	(Morocco) RS Berkane
	Report	El Bahri 32'; El Moudane 71' (pen.)

Prince Moulay Abdellah Stadium, Rabat
Referee: Mustapha Ghorbal (Algeria)

Man of the Match:

Assistant referees:
Abdelhak Etchiali (Algeria)
Mokrane Gourari (Algeria)
Fourth official:
Pacifique Ndabihawenimana (Burundi)
Video assistant referee:
Lahlou Benbraham (Algeria)
Assistant video assistant referees:
Dahane Beida (Mauritania)
El Hadj Malick Samba (Senegal)

**Match rules**
- 90 minutes.
- Penalty shoot-out if scores level.
- Nine named substitutes, of which up to five may be used. (Note: Each team was only given three opportunities to make substitutions, excluding substitutions made at half-time.)

== See also ==
- 2022 CAF Champions League Final
- 2022 CAF Confederation Cup Final
