= 2010 CAF Super Cup =

TP Mazembe	Stade Malien
(Democratic Republic of the Congo)	(Mali)
2	0
- Date: 21 February 2010
- Venue: Stade de la Kenya, Lubumbashi
- Referee: Rajindraparsad Seechurn (Mauritius)
- Attendance: 35,000

The 2010 CAF Super Cup was the 18th CAF Super Cup, an annual football match in Africa organized by the Confederation of African Football (CAF), between the winners of the previous season's two CAF club competitions, the CAF Champions League and the CAF Confederation Cup. The match was contested between TP Mazembe of the Democratic Republic of the Congo, who won the 2009 CAF Champions League, and Stade Malien de Bamako of Mali, who won the 2009 CAF Confederation Cup.

== Teams ==
Team	Qualification	Previous participation (bold indicates winners)
(Democratic Republic of the Congo) TP Mazembe	2009 CAF Champions League winner	None
(Mali) Stade Malien	2009 CAF Confederation Cup winner	None

== Match details ==
21 February 2010

TP Mazembe (Democratic Republic of the Congo)	2 – 0	(Mali) Stade Malien
Sunzu 16'; Singuluma 80'	Report

Stade de la Kenya, Lubumbashi
Attendance: 35,000
Referee: Rajindraparsad Seechurn (Mauritius)

== Champions ==
2010 CAF Super Cup winners

**TP Mazembe**
**First Title**
