= CAF Super Cup =

African association football competition

- Organiser(s): CAF
- Founded: 1993
- Region: Africa
- Teams: 2
- Current champions: (Algeria) USM Alger (2nd title)
- Most championships: (Egypt) Al Ahly (8 titles)
- Website: Official website
- 2026 CAF Super Cup

The CAF Super Cup, known as TotalEnergies CAF Super Cup for sponsorship reasons, is an annual African association football competition contested between the winners of the CAF Champions League and the CAF Confederation Cup. The competition was first held in 1993 and is organized by the CAF.

Egyptian clubs have the highest number of victories (14 titles), Moroccan clubs have the largest number of winning teams, with four clubs from each having won the title. The competition has been won by 18 clubs, 6 of which have won it more than once.

USM Alger are the current defending champions, having beaten Mamelodi Sundowns 3–1 in the 2026 CAF Super Cup. Al Ahly is the most successful club in the competition's history, having won the tournament a record 8 times.

== History ==
The African Super Cup started and organized in 1993 by the CAF under the name of the CAF Super Cup, It is played in a single match and on the field of the winner of the CAF Champions League (exception in 2007). Until 2003, the African Super cup pitted the winner of the Champions League against the winner of the African Cup Winners' Cup. When the latter disappeared, it was the winner of the CAF Confederation Cup who took the place. The notable edition was in 1994, Zamalek and Al Ahly, the two Egyptian belligerents met for the trophy in the infamous Cairo derby. They met in FNB Stadium in Johannesburg, South Africa. Zamalek won and achieved the title as the first Egyptian team to win the African Super cup.

On only six occasions, the winner of the Champions League lost in this competition: the Ivorian club Africa Sports d'Abidjan beat the Moroccans Wydad AC in the first edition in Abidjan in 1993, the ES Sahel have beat Raja CA in 1997, Maghreb de Fès beat ES Tunis in 2012, Raja CA and Zamalek SC beat ES Tunis in 2019 and 2020, and finally RS Berkane have beat Wydad AC in 2022.

Fez Maghreb is the first Confederation Cup winning club to have won the CAF Super cup since the CAF Champions League winner clashed with the CAF Confederation Cup winner. CAF introduced a new trophy design to take effect from the 2024 edition, featuring sleek lines, metallic tones, and a stylized map of Africa to symbolize unity and progress in African football. Zamalek SC won the 2024 CAF Super Cup, after beating Al Ahly SC 4–3 in a penalty shootout after a 1–1 draw in the famous Cairo derby. The match became known as the Super of the Century. Pyramids FC won the 2025 CAF Super Cup with a 1–0 victory over RS Berkane in Cairo, claiming their first title and becoming the third Egyptian side to claim the trophy.

== Venues ==
=== List of venues since 2015 ===
- 2015: Stade Mustapha Tchaker, Blida, Algeria
- 2016: Stade TP Mazembe, Lubumbashi, DR Congo
- 2017: Loftus Versfeld Stadium, Pretoria, South Africa
- 2018: Stade Mohammed V, Casablanca, Morocco
- 2019: Thani bin Jassim Stadium, Doha, Qatar
- 2020: Thani bin Jassim Stadium, Doha, Qatar
- 2021 (May): Jassim bin Hamad Stadium, Doha, Qatar
- 2021 (Dec): Ahmed bin Ali Stadium, Al Rayyan, Qatar
- 2022: Prince Moulay Abdellah Stadium, Rabat, Morocco
- 2023: King Fahd Stadium, Taif, Saudi Arabia
- 2024: Kingdom Arena, Riyadh, Saudi Arabia
- 2025: 30 June Stadium, Cairo, Egypt
- 2026: Loftus Versfeld Stadium, Pretoria, South Africa

== Sponsorship ==
In July 2016, Total secured an eight-year sponsorship package from the Confederation of African Football (CAF) to support 10 of its principal competitions. Total started with the Africa Cup of Nations that was held in Gabon therefore renaming it Total Africa cup of Nations. Due to this sponsorship, starting from 2017 the tournament is called the "Total CAF Super Cup".

Title Sponsor	Official Sponsors
Total	Orange; Qnet; 1xBet

== Records and statistics ==
=== Winners ===
Club	Winners	Runners-up	Years won	Years runner-up
(Egypt) Al Ahly	8	4	2002, 2006, 2007, 2009, 2013, 2014, 2021 (May), 2021 (Dec)	1994, 2015, 2023 2024
(Egypt) Zamalek	5	1	1994, 1997, 2003, 2020, 2024	2001
(Democratic Republic of the Congo) TP Mazembe	3	2	2010, 2011, 2016	2017, 2018
(Tunisia) ES Sahel	2	3	1998, 2008	2004, 2007, 2016
(Morocco) Raja CA	2	2	2000, 2019	1998, 2021 (Dec)
(Nigeria) Enyimba	2	0	2004, 2005	—
(Algeria) USM Alger	2	0	2023, 2026	—
(Tunisia) ES Tunis	1	4	1995	1999, 2012, 2019, 2020
(Morocco) Wydad AC	1	3	2018	1993, 2003, 2022
(Morocco) RS Berkane	1	2	2022	2021 (May), 2025
(Ivory Coast) Africa Sports	1	1	1993	2000
(Ghana) Hearts of Oak	1	1	2001	2005
(South Africa) Mamelodi Sundowns	1	1	2017	2026
(South Africa) Orlando Pirates	1	0	1996	—
(Ivory Coast) ASEC Mimosas	1	0	1999	—
(Morocco) Maghreb Fes	1	0	2012	—
(Algeria) ES Sétif	1	0	2015	—
(Egypt) Pyramids FC	1	0	2025	—
(Tunisia) CS Sfaxien	0	3	—	2008, 2009, 2014
(Democratic Republic of the Congo) DC Motema Pembe	0	1	—	1995
(Algeria) JS Kabylie	0	1	—	1996
(Egypt) Al Mokawloon Al Arab	0	1	—	1997
(South Africa) Kaizer Chiefs FC	0	1	—	2002
(Morocco) AS FAR	0	1	—	2006
(Mali) Stade Malien	0	1	—	2010
(Morocco) Fath Union Sport	0	1	—	2011
(Republic of the Congo) AC Léopards	0	1	—	2013

=== By country ===
Nation	Winners	Runners-up	Total
Egypt	14	6	20
Morocco	5	9	14
Tunisia	3	10	13
DR Congo^{[B]}	3	3	6
Algeria	3	1	4
South Africa	2	2	4
Ivory Coast	2	1	3
Nigeria	2	0	2
Ghana	1	1	2
Mali	0	1	1
Congo	0	1	1

== Prize money ==
In 2017 and 2018, prize money shared between CAF Champions League winner and CAF Confederations Cup winner in CAF Super Cup were as following :

Final position	Money awarded to club
Winner	US$100,000
Runners-up	US$75,000

Since 2019, prize money in CAF Super Cup are as following :

Final position	Money awarded to club
Winner	US$200,000
Runners-up	US$150,000

Since 2023, prize money in CAF Super Cup are as following :

Final position	Money awarded to club
Winner	US$500,000
Runners-up	US$250,000

== Broadcast coverage ==
Below are the current broadcast rights holders of this competition:

Country/Region	Channels
ASEAN	beIN Sports
Benin	ORTB
Europe	Sportfive
France	beIN Sports
Burkina Faso	RTB
Latin America	ESPN
Ghana	GTV Sports+; StarTimes
(Arab League) MENA	beIN Sports
South Africa	SuperSport; SABC Sport
Western Balkans	Sport Klub
United States	beIN Sports
Sub-Saharan Africa	Canal+; SuperSport (selected matches); StarTimes (except South Africa)
East Africa	TVZ; ZBC

== See also ==
- CAF Champions League
- CAF Confederation Cup
- Super Cup
