= 2010–11 AS Khroub season =

AS Khroub
2010–11 season
- Chairman: Abdelkrim Kitouni (from 5 February 2011)
- Head coach: Azzedine Aït Djoudi (until 12 September 2010); Lamine Boughrara (from 17 April 2011)
- Stadium: Abed Hamdani Stadium
- Ligue 1: 8th
- Algerian Cup: Round of 64
- Top goalscorer: League: Gilles Ngomo (4 goals); Khalid Leghzal (4 goals); All: Oussama Mesfar (4 goals); Gilles Ngomo (4 goals); Khalid Leghzal (4 goals)

In the 2010–11 season, AS Khroub is competing in the Ligue 1 for the 4th season, as well as the Algerian Cup. They will be competing in Ligue 1, and the Algerian Cup.

== Squad list ==
Players and squad numbers last updated on 18 November 2010.
Note: Flags indicate national team as has been defined under FIFA eligibility rules. Players may hold more than one non-FIFA nationality.

| No. | Nat. | Position | Name | Date of Birth (Age) | Signed from |
Goalkeepers
| 1 | (Algeria) | GK | Nassim Benkhodja | 2 February 1985 (aged 25) | (Algeria) A Bou Saâda |
| 12 | (Algeria) | GK | Hassane Toual | 3 January 1983 (aged 27) | (Algeria) MSP Batna |
| 22 | (Algeria) | GK | Ammar Belhani | 27 October 1971 (aged 39) | (Algeria) ES Sétif |
Defenders
| 3 | (Algeria) | CB | Nasreddine Chekatti | 3 February 1983 (aged 27) | (Algeria) ES Guelma |
| 18 | (Algeria) | | Adlène Boutnaf | 23 February 1984 (aged 26) | (Algeria) OM Ruisseau |
| 20 | (Algeria) | LB | Izzedine Khellafi | 1 September 1985 (aged 25) | Unknown |
| 21 | (Algeria) | CB | Oussama Zouak | 10 December 1986 (aged 24) | (France) AS Saint-Priest |
| 25 | (Algeria) | CB | Rabah Ziad | 20 December 1987 (aged 23) | (Algeria) USM El Harrach |
| | (Algeria) | RB | Réda Ârâr | 27 January 1980 (aged 30) | (Algeria) CA Batna |
| | (Algeria) | LB | Abdelaziz Hamedi | 11 December 1978 (aged 32) | Unknown |
| | (Algeria) | CB | Touhami Sebie | 3 May 1988 (aged 22) | (Algeria) USM Blida |
| | (Algeria) | | Charaf Eddine Haloui | 1 April 1991 (aged 19) | Unknown |
| | (Algeria) | RB | Amir Belaili | 10 February 1991 (aged 19) | (Algeria) AS Khroub U21 |
Midfielders
| 4 | (Algeria) | | Mustapha Derbani | 4 March 1990 (aged 20) | (Algeria) AS Khroub U21 |
| 6 | (Algeria) | AM | Samir Mohand Si Hadj | 16 July 1982 (aged 28) | (Algeria) AS Khroub U21 |
| 11 | (Algeria) | RM | Karim Nait Yahia | 19 December 1980 (aged 30) | (Algeria) MO Béjaïa |
| 17 | (Algeria) | LM | Hamza Bounab | 16 December 1983 (aged 27) | (Algeria) CA Bordj Bou Arreridj |
| 23 | (Algeria) | AM | Mohamed Amine Chaib | 11 January 1987 (aged 23) | (Algeria) Hamra Annaba |
| 24 | (Algeria) | | Djamel Bouras | 13 September 1990 (aged 20) | (Algeria) AS Khroub U21 |
| | (Cameroon) | DM | Gilles Ngomo | 23 February 1987 (aged 23) | (Cameroon) Canon Yaoundé |
| | (Algeria) | DM | Mohamed Laid Rezig | 7 January 1985 (aged 25) | (Algeria) USM Bel Abbès |
| | (Algeria) | RW | Hichem Manseur | 4 October 1991 (aged 19) | (Algeria) AS Khroub U21 |
Forwards
| 7 | (Algeria) | RW | Oussama Mesfar | 28 March 1989 (aged 21) | (Algeria) AS Khroub U21 |
| 10 | (Algeria) | | Khalid Leghzal | 9 August 1988 (aged 22) | (France) Tours FC B |
| 14 | (Algeria) | CF | Omar Bellagra | 21 May 1986 (aged 24) | (Portugal) Naval 1º de Maio |
| 20 | (Algeria) | | Sami Zegrour | 16 June 1986 (aged 24) | (Algeria) MO Béjaïa |
| | (Algeria) | | Mohamed Boussefiane | 18 January 1985 (aged 25) | (Algeria) NA Hussein Dey |

== Competitions ==
=== Overview ===
| Competition | Record | | | | | | | | Started round | Final position / round | First match | Last match |
| Competition | G | W | D | L | GF | GA | GD | Win % | Started round | Final position / round | First match | Last match |
|---|---|---|---|---|---|---|---|---|---|---|---|---|
| Ligue 1 | 30 | 10 | 9 | 11 | 30 | 36 | −6 | 33.33 | —N/a | 8th | 25 September 2010 | 8 July 2011 |
| Algerian Cup | 1 | 0 | 0 | 1 | 1 | 3 | −2 | 0.00 | Round of 64 | | 1 January 2011 | |
| Total | 31 | 10 | 9 | 12 | 31 | 39 | −8 | 32.26 | | | | |

Updated to match played 9 May 2017
Source: Competitions

== League table ==
| Pos | Team | Pld | W | D | L | GF | GA | GD | Pts |
|---|---|---|---|---|---|---|---|---|---|
| 6 | MC Saïda | 30 | 11 | 9 | 10 | 33 | 35 | −2 | 42 |
| 7 | MC Oran | 30 | 11 | 8 | 11 | 26 | 27 | −1 | 41 |
| 8 | AS Khroub | 30 | 10 | 9 | 11 | 30 | 36 | −6 | 39 |
| 9 | USM Alger | 30 | 9 | 11 | 10 | 32 | 28 | +4 | 38 |
| 10 | MC Alger | 30 | 8 | 13 | 9 | 30 | 28 | +2 | 37 |

Updated to match(es) played on 19 April 2018. Source: DZFoot
Rules for classification: 1) points; 2) head-to-head points; 3) head-to-head goal difference; 4) goal difference; 5) total goals; 6) fairplay ranking; 7) playoff.

=== Results summary ===
| Overall | | | | | | | | Home | | | | | | Away | | | | | |
| Pld | W | D | L | GF | GA | GD | Pts | W | D | L | GF | GA | GD | W | D | L | GF | GA | GD |
|---|---|---|---|---|---|---|---|---|---|---|---|---|---|---|---|---|---|---|---|
| 30 | 10 | 9 | 11 | 30 | 36 | −6 | 39 | 8 | 4 | 3 | 22 | 16 | +6 | 2 | 5 | 8 | 8 | 20 | −12 |

Last updated: 29 December 2014.
Source: Competitive matches

=== Results by round ===
| Round | 1 | 2 | 3 | 4 | 5 | 6 | 7 | 8 | 9 | 10 | 11 | 12 | 13 | 14 | 15 | 16 | 17 | 18 | 19 | 20 | 21 | 22 | 23 | 24 | 25 | 26 | 27 | 28 | 29 | 30 |
|---|---|---|---|---|---|---|---|---|---|---|---|---|---|---|---|---|---|---|---|---|---|---|---|---|---|---|---|---|---|---|
| Ground | A | H | A | A | H | A | H | A | H | A | H | A | H | A | H | H | A | H | H | A | H | A | H | A | H | A | H | A | H | A |
| Result | L | L | L | L | D | W | W | L | D | L | L | D | W | L | W | W | D | D | L | D | W | L | W | D | D | L | W | D | W | W |
| Position | 10 | 16 | 16 | 16 | 15 | 14 | 13 | 14 | 13 | 13 | 15 | 15 | 15 | 15 | 15 | 11 | 11 | 12 | 12 | 12 | 10 | 12 | 9 | 10 | 10 | 12 | 11 | 11 | 9 | 8 |

Source: Competitive matches
A = Away; H = Home; W = Win; D = Draw; L = Loss

=== Matches ===
Win Draw Loss

| 25 September 2010 Round 1 | JS Kabylie | 3–2 | AS Khroub | Tizi Ouzou |
| 17:00 | Aoudia 17'; Yaâlaoui 41' (pen.); Nessakh 84' | Soccerway report | Ngomo 39'; Boutnaf 83' | Stadium: Stade 1er Novembre 1954; Referee: Abdelkader Karabi |

| 2 October 2010 Round 2 | AS Khroub | 2–3 | MC Alger | El Khroub |
| 17:00 | Bounab 25'; Leghzal 38' | Soccerway report | Amroune 1'; Mokdad 72' (pen.); Derrag 81' | Stadium: Stade Abed Hamdani; Referee: Boubekeur Zouaoui |

| 16 October 2010 Round 3 | MC El Eulma | 2–1 | AS Khroub | El Eulma |
| 17:00 | Boulemdaïs 34'; Ghodbane 90' | Soccerway report | Leghzal 64' | Stadium: Stade Messaoud Zougar; Referee: Redouane Necib |

| 23 October 2010 Round 4 | MC Oran | 1–0 | AS Khroub | Oran |
| 17:00 | Boukessassa 63' | Soccerway report | | Stadium: Ahmed Zabana Stadium; Referee: Mohamed Haddada |

| 26 October 2010 Round 5 | AS Khroub | 0–0 | CR Belouizdad | El Khroub |
| 17:00 | | Soccerway report | | Stadium: Stade Abed Hamdani; Referee: Mohamed Bouhenni |

| 29 October 2010 Round 6 | CA Bordj Bou Arreridj | 0–1 | AS Khroub | Bordj Bou Arréridj |
| 19:00 | | Soccerway report | Leghzal 90' | Stadium: Stade 20 Août 1955; Referee: Mohamed Bichari |

| 6 November 2010 Round 7 | AS Khroub | 2–1 | WA Tlemcen | El Khroub |
| 14:30 | Leghzal 18' (pen.); Chekatti 88' | Soccerway report | Belgherri 45' (pen.) | Stadium: Stade Abed Hamdani; Referee: Farouk Mial |

| 13 November 2010 Round 8 | USM Annaba | 3–0 | AS Khroub | Annaba |
| 14:30 | Ali Guechi 1'; Mekkaoui 20'; Balegh 90' (pen.) | Soccerway report | | Stadium: May 19, 1956 Stadium; Referee: Ali Bouali |

| 27 November 2010 Round 9 | AS Khroub | 3–3 | ES Sétif | El Khroub |
| 14:30 | Zegrour 3'; Si Hadj Mohand 10'; Mesfar 72' | Soccerway report | Ghazali 50'; Feham 86'; Djallit 89' | Stadium: Stade Abed Hamdani; Referee: Farouk Houasnia |

| 3 December 2010 Round 10 | USM Alger | 1–0 | AS Khroub | Bologhine |
| 15:00 | Hamidi 32' | Soccerway report | | Stadium: Omar Hamadi Stadium; Referee: Sofiane Bousseter |

| 11 December 2010 Round 11 | AS Khroub | 0–3 | ASO Chlef | El Khroub |
| 14:30 | | Soccerway report | Soudani 20'; Messaoud 33'; Zaouche 81' | Stadium: Stade Abed Hamdani; Referee: Mohamed Bouhenni |

| 17 December 2011 Round 12 | JSM Béjaïa | 0–0 | AS Khroub | Béjaïa |
| 18:00 | | Soccerway report | | Stadium: Stade de l'Unité Maghrébine; Referee: Djamel Haimoudi |

| 24 December 2010 Round 13 | AS Khroub | 1–0 | USM El Harrach | El Khroub |
| 15:00 | Ngomo 49' | Soccerway report | | Stadium: Stade Abed Hamdani; Referee: Mohamed Benouza |

| 19 February 2011 Round 14 | MC Saïda | 3–0 | AS Khroub | Saida |
| 14:30 | Akkouche 25'; Madouni 49'; Saâdi 77' | Soccerway report | | Stadium: April 13, 1958 Stadium; Referee: Mohamed Haddada |

| 26 February 2011 Round 15 | AS Khroub | 1–0 | USM Blida | El Khroub |
| 13:30 | Bellagra 25' (pen.) | Soccerway report | | Stadium: Stade Abed Hamdani; Referee: Redouane Necib |

| 10 May 2011 Round 16 | AS Khroub | 1–0 | JS Kabylie | El Khroub |
| 17:00 | Ngomo 56' | Soccerway report | | Stadium: Stade Abed Hamdani; Referee: Farouk Houasnia |

| 29 March 2011 Round 17 | MC Alger | 0–0 | AS Khroub | Algiers |
| 15:30 | | Soccerway report | | Stadium: Stade 5 Juillet 1962; Referee: Mohamed Sahraoui |

| 2 April 2011 Round 18 | AS Khroub | 0–0 | MC El Eulma | El Khroub |
| 15:30 | | Soccerway report | | Stadium: Stade Abed Hamdani; Referee: Mehdi Abid Charef |

| 13 April 2011 Round 19 | AS Khroub | 1–2 | MC Oran | El Khroub |
| 15:00 | Maanser 72' | Soccerway report | Chérif 55', 65' | Stadium: Stade Abed Hamdani; Referee: Sofiane Bousseter |

| 25 April 2011 Round 20 | CR Belouizdad | 1–1 | AS Khroub | Belouizdad |
| 17:00 | Bourakba 38' (pen.) | Soccerway report | Ziad 19' | Stadium: Stade 20 Août 1955; Referee: Bouaza Chenane |

| 7 May 2011 Round 21 | AS Khroub | 2–0 | CA Bordj Bou Arreridj | El Khroub |
| 17:00 | Mesfar 47'; Naït Yahia 50' | Soccerway report | | Stadium: Stade Abed Hamdani; Referee: Mokhtar Amalou |

| 14 May 2011 Round 22 | WA Tlemcen | 2–0 | AS Khroub | Tlemcen |
| 17:00 | Bachiri 28'; Mebarki 42' | Soccerway report | | Stadium: Stade Akid Lotfi; Referee: Merzak Halalchi |

| 21 May 2011 Round 23 | AS Khroub | 3–1 | USM Annaba | El Khroub |
| 17:00 | Zouak 19'; Bounab 33'; Mesfar 59' | Soccerway report | Herbache 30' (pen.) | Stadium: Stade Abed Hamdani; Referee: Youssef Zerrouki |

| 18 June 2011 Round 24 | ES Sétif | 1–1 | AS Khroub | Sétif |
| 20:00 | Metref 49' | Soccerway report | Hamedi 24' | Stadium: Stade 8 Mai 1945; Referee: Farouk Mial |

| 31 May 2011 Round 25 | AS Khroub | 0–0 | USM Alger | El Khroub |
| 16:00 | | Soccerway report | | Stadium: Stade Abed Hamdani; Referee: Mohamed Sahraoui |

| 11 June 2011 Round 26 | ASO Chlef | 2–0 | AS Khroub | Chlef |
| 20:00 | Soudani 56', 61' | Soccerway report | | Stadium: Stade Mohamed Boumezrag; Referee: Mohamed Amine Ghorbal |

| 25 June 2011 Round 27 | AS Khroub | 4–2 | JSM Béjaïa | El Khroub |
| 18:00 | Boutnaf 2'; Mesfar 8' (pen.); Hamedi 52'; Megateli 72' (o.g.) | Soccerway report | Meftah 5'; Boulaïnceur 6' | Stadium: Stade Abed Hamdani; Referee: Mohamed Bichari |

| 28 June 2011 Round 28 | USM El Harrach | 1–1 | AS Khroub | Algiers |
| 18:00 | Griche 90+4' | Soccerway report | Ngomo 1' | Stadium: Stade 1er Novembre 1954; Referee: Youssef Zerrouki |

| 1 July 2011 Round 29 | AS Khroub | 2–1 | MC Saïda | El Khroub |
| 18:00 | Belaïli 37'; Boutnaf 49' | Soccerway report | Cheraïtia 15' | Stadium: Stade Abed Hamdani; Referee: Khaled Saâdi |

| 8 July 2011 Round 30 | USM Blida | 0–1 | AS Khroub | Blida |
| 17:00 | | Soccerway report | Belaïli 87' | Stadium: Stade Mustapha Tchaker; Referee: Bouaza Chenane |

== Algerian Cup ==
| 1 January 2011 Round of 64 | AS Khroub | 1–3 | MO Béjaïa | El Khroub |
| 14:00 | Mesfar 49' | Report | Souakir 34', 41', 46' | Stadium: Stade Abed Hamdani |
Note: Lineup for AS Khroub - Benkhodja - Si Hadj (Chekkati 71’), Boutnaf, Ziad, Heloui - Ngomo (Salhi 86’), Khellafi, Bounab, Naït Yahia - Mesfar, Zegrour (Chaïb 77’).

== Squad information ==
=== Playing statistics ===
| No. | Pos | Nat | Player | Total | | Ligue 1 | | Algerian Cup | |
| No. | Pos | Nat | Player | Apps | Goals | Apps | Goals | Apps | Goals |
Goalkeepers
| 22 | GK | (Algeria) ALG | Ammar Belhani | 3 | 0 | 3 | 0 | 0 | 0 |
| 12 | GK | (Algeria) ALG | Hassane Toual | 7 | 0 | 7 | 0 | 0 | 0 |
| 1 | GK | (Algeria) ALG | Nassim Benkhodja | 21 | 0 | 20 | 0 | 1 | 0 |
Defenders
| | DF | (Algeria) ALG | Réda Ârâr | 10 | 0 | 10 | 0 | 0 | 0 |
| | DF | (Algeria) ALG | Abdelaziz Hamedi | 12 | 2 | 12 | 2 | 0 | 0 |
| 25 | DF | (Algeria) ALG | Rabah Ziad | 26 | 1 | 25 | 1 | 1 | 0 |
| | DF | (Algeria) ALG | Touhami Sebie | 13 | 0 | 13 | 0 | 0 | 0 |
| 18 | DF | (Algeria) ALG | Adlène Boutnaf | 20 | 3 | 19 | 3 | 1 | 0 |
| 20 | DF | (Algeria) ALG | Izzedine Khellafi | 26 | 0 | 25 | 0 | 1 | 0 |
| | DF | (Algeria) ALG | Charaf Eddine Haloui | 13 | 0 | 12 | 0 | 1 | 0 |
| 3 | DF | (Algeria) ALG | Nasreddine Chekatti | 13 | 1 | 12 | 1 | 1 | 0 |
| | DF | (Algeria) ALG | Amir Belaili | 8 | 2 | 8 | 2 | 0 | 0 |
Midfielders
| | MF | (Cameroon) CMR | Gilles Ngomo | 28 | 4 | 27 | 4 | 1 | 0 |
| | MF | (Algeria) ALG | Mohamed Laid Rezig | 12 | 0 | 12 | 0 | 0 | 0 |
| 11 | MF | (Algeria) ALG | Karim Nait Yahia | 22 | 1 | 21 | 1 | 1 | 0 |
| 6 | MF | (Algeria) ALG | Samir Mohand Si Hadj | 18 | 1 | 17 | 1 | 1 | 0 |
| 17 | MF | (Algeria) ALG | Hamza Bounab | 26 | 2 | 25 | 2 | 1 | 0 |
| 21 | MF | (Algeria) ALG | Oussama Zouak | 28 | 1 | 28 | 1 | 0 | 0 |
| | MF | (Algeria) ALG | Hichem Manseur | 20 | 1 | 20 | 1 | 0 | 0 |
| 4 | MF | (Algeria) ALG | Mustapha Derbani | 2 | 0 | 2 | 0 | 0 | 0 |
| 23 | MF | (Algeria) ALG | Mohamed Amine Chaib | 1 | 0 | 1 | 0 | 0 | 0 |
| 24 | MF | (Algeria) ALG | Djamel Bouras | 4 | 0 | 4 | 0 | 0 | 0 |
| | MF | (Algeria) ALG | H Mesfar | 2 | 1 | 2 | 1 | 0 | 0 |
| | MF | (Algeria) ALG | Charaf Eddine Kassis | 1 | 0 | 1 | 0 | 0 | 0 |
| | MF | (Algeria) ALG | Yahia Djilali | 2 | 0 | 2 | 0 | 0 | 0 |
Forwards
| | FW | (Algeria) ALG | Mohamed Boussefiane | 11 | 0 | 11 | 0 | 0 | 0 |
| 7 | FW | (Algeria) ALG | Oussama Mesfar | 22 | 4 | 21 | 3 | 1 | 1 |
| | FW | (Algeria) ALG | Toufik Chaïb | 9 | 0 | 8 | 0 | 1 | 0 |
| 14 | FW | (Algeria) ALG | Omar Bellagra | 10 | 1 | 10 | 1 | 0 | 0 |
| 10 | FW | (Algeria) ALG | Khalid Leghzal | 19 | 4 | 19 | 4 | 0 | 0 |
| | FW | (Algeria) ALG | Antar | 1 | 0 | 1 | 0 | 0 | 0 |
| 20 | FW | (Algeria) ALG | Sami Zegrour | 11 | 1 | 10 | 1 | 1 | 0 |
Players transferred out during the season

Last updated: 25 November 2017
Source: fr.soccerway.com

== Transfers ==
=== In ===
| Date | Pos | Player | From club | Transfer fee | Source |
|---|---|---|---|---|---|
| 1 July 2010 | GK | (Algeria) Nassim Benkhodja | A Bou Saâda | Free transfer | |
| 1 July 2010 | DF | (Algeria) Boubaker Salhi | ES Sétif | Free transfer | |
| 1 July 2010 | DF | (Algeria) Adlène Boutnaf | OM Ruisseau | Free transfer | |
| 1 July 2010 | DF | (Algeria) Nasreddine Chekatti | ES Guelma | Free transfer | |
| 1 July 2010 | MF | (Algeria) Oussama Zouak | (France) AS Saint-Priest | Free transfer | |
| 1 July 2010 | FW | (Algeria) Khalid Leghzal | (France) Tours FC B | Free transfer | |
| 1 July 2010 | MF | (Algeria) Hamza Bounab | CA Bordj Bou Arreridj | Free transfer | |
| 1 July 2010 | FW | (Algeria) Sami Zegrour | MO Béjaïa | Free transfer | |
| 1 July 2010 | FW | (Algeria) Omar Bellagra | (Portugal) Naval 1º de Maio | Free transfer | |
| 11 July 2010 | GK | (Algeria) Hassane Toual | MSP Batna | Free transfer | |
| 1 January 2011 | DF | (Algeria) Touhami Sebie | USM Blida | Free transfer | |
| 1 January 2011 | FW | (Algeria) Mohamed Boussefiane | NA Hussein Dey | Free transfer | |

=== Out ===
| Date | Pos | Player | To club | Transfer fee | Source |
|---|---|---|---|---|---|
| 1 July 2010 | FW | (Algeria) Djabir Naamoune | MC El Eulma | Free transfer | |
