= 2011–12 ES Sétif season =

ES Sétif
2011–12 season
- Chairman: Abdelhakim Serrar
- Head coach: Alain Geiger (from 22 September 2011)
- Stadium: Stade 8 Mai 1945, Sétif
- Ligue 1: Winner
- Algerian Cup: Winner
- Confederation Cup: First round
- Top goalscorer: League: Mohamed Amine Aoudia (12); All: Mohamed Amine Aoudia (14); Mokhtar Benmoussa (14)
Home colours	Away colours	Third colours

In the 2011–12 season, ES Sétif competed in the Ligue 1 for the 42nd season, as well as the Algerian Cup. It was their 14th consecutive season in the top flight of Algerian football. They also competed in Ligue 1, the Confederation Cup and Algerian Cup.

== Squad list ==
Players and squad numbers last updated on 18 November 2011.
Note: Flags indicate national team as has been defined under FIFA eligibility rules. Players may hold more than one non-FIFA nationality.

No.	Nat.	Position	Name	Date of birth (age)	Signed from
Goalkeepers
Defenders
Midfielders
Forwards

== Competitions ==
=== Overview ===
Competition	Record								Started round	Final position / round	First match	Last match
Competition	G	W	D	L	GF	GA	GD	Win %	Started round	Final position / round	First match	Last match
Ligue 1	30	16	5	9	53	40	+13	53.33	—N/a	Winner	10 September 2011	19 May 2012
Algerian Cup	6	6	0	0	16	7	+9	100.00	Round of 64	Winner	30 December 2011	1 May 2012
Confederation Cup	2	1	0	1	3	3	+0	50.00	First round		25 March 2012	6 April 2012
Total	38	23	5	10	72	50	+22	60.53				

Updated to match played 9 May 2017
Source: Competitions

== League table ==
Pos	Team	Pld	W	D	L	GF	GA	GD	Pts	Qualification or relegation
1	ES Sétif (C)	30	16	5	9	53	40	+13	53	Qualification for the Champions League preliminary round
2	JSM Béjaïa	30	15	8	7	40	26	+14	53	Qualification for the Champions League preliminary round
3	USM Alger	30	15	7	8	37	25	+12	52	Qualification for the Confederation Cup preliminary round
4	CR Belouizdad	30	13	9	8	34	28	+6	48	
5	ASO Chlef	30	14	5	11	41	34	+7	47	

Updated to match(es) played on 19 April 2018. Source: DZFoot
Rules for classification: 1) points; 2) head-to-head points; 3) head-to-head goal difference; 4) goal difference; 5) total goals; 6) fairplay ranking; 7) playoff.
(C) Champions

=== Results summary ===
Overall								Home						Away					
Pld	W	D	L	GF	GA	GD	Pts	W	D	L	GF	GA	GD	W	D	L	GF	GA	GD
30	16	5	9	53	40	+13	53	10	2	3	29	18	+11	6	3	6	24	22	+2

Last updated: 29 December 2014.
Source: Competitive matches

=== Results by round ===
Round	1	2	3	4	5	6	7	8	9	10	11	12	13	14	15	16	17	18	19	20	21	22	23	24	25	26	27	28	29	30
Ground	H	A	H	A	H	A	H	A	H	A	H	A	H	A	H	A	H	A	H	A	H	A	H	A	H	A	H	A	H	A
Result	W	L	L	L	W	D	D	W	W	W	W	D	W	L	W	W	L	W	W	D	W	W	W	L	D	L	W	W	W	L
Position																												1	1	1

Source: Competitive matches
A = Away; H = Home; W = Win; D = Draw; L = Loss

=== Matches ===
10 September 2011 Round 1	ES Sétif	3–2	NA Hussein Dey	Sétif
20:00	Hachoud 12', 90'; Aoudia 59'	Report	Saïbi 49'; Derrardja 80'	Stadium: Stade 8 Mai 1945; Referee: Mohamed Amine Ghorbal

20 September 2011 Round 2	MC Alger	1–0	ES Sétif	Algiers
20:00	Yaâlaoui 16'	Report		Stadium: Stade 5 Juillet 1962; Referee: Sofiane Bousseter

24 September 2011 Round 3	ES Sétif	1–2	JSM Béjaïa	Sétif
21:45	Djabou 89'	Report	Yabeun 32'; Boucherit 60'	Stadium: Stade 8 Mai 1945; Referee: Mehdi Abid Charef

1 October 2011 Round 4	USM El Harrach	3–2	ES Sétif	Algiers
17:00	Saha 45'; Layati 48'; Aïssaoui 75' (pen.)	Report	Aoudia 55'; Gourmi 66' (pen.)	Stadium: Stade 1er Novembre 1954; Referee: Farouk Mial

15 October 2011 Round 5	ES Sétif	3–1	ASO Chlef	Sétif
19:00	Hachoud 21'; Diss 40'; Djabou 80'	Report	Messaoud 39'	Stadium: Stade 8 Mai 1945; Referee: Farouk Houasnia

22 October 2011 Round 6	AS Khroub	2–2	ES Sétif	El Khroub
19:00	Bounab 23'; Koffi 65'	Report	Diss 3'; Nadji 69'	Stadium: Abed Hamdani Stadium; Referee: Mokhtar Amalou

29 October 2011 Round 7	ES Sétif	1–1	MC El Eulma	Sétif
19:00	Djabou 73'	Report	Tiaïba 6'	Stadium: Stade 8 Mai 1945; Referee: Sofiane Bousseter

4 November 2011 Round 8	CR Belouizdad	1–3	ES Sétif	Belouizdad
18:00	Abdat 45'	Report	Aoudia 68'; Djahnit 72'; Hachoud 90+2' (pen.)	Stadium: Stade 20 Août 1955; Referee: Mohamed Benouza

19 November 2011 Round 9	ES Sétif	2–1	CA Batna	Sétif
18:00	Hachoud 30', 45'	Report	Messadia 20'	Stadium: Stade 8 Mai 1945; Referee: Mehdi Abid Charef

22 November 2011 Round 10	MC Oran	2–4	ES Sétif	Oran
15:00	El Bahari 77', 83'	Report	Gourmi 19' (pen.); Benmoussa 45+3' (pen.); Djabou 60'; Nadji 75'	Stadium: Ahmed Zabana Stadium; Referee: Farouk Mial

26 November 2011 Round 11	ES Sétif	3–1	WA Tlemcen	Sétif
18:00	Benmoussa 2', 79'; Hachoud 6'	Report	Zouaoui 28'	Stadium: Stade 8 Mai 1945; Referee: Merzak Halalchi

3 December 2011 Round 12	JS Kabylie	2–2	ES Sétif	Tizi Ouzou
15:00	Hanifi 60'; Tedjar 74' (pen.)	Report	Hachoud 38'; Aoudia 50'	Stadium: Stade du 1er Novembre 1954; Referee: Mohamed Amine Ghorbal

10 December 2011 Round 13	ES Sétif	3–1	MC Saïda	Sétif
18:00	Aoudia 19'; Megueni 27'; Ghazali 35'	Report	Hadiouche 90+3'	Stadium: Stade 8 Mai 1945; Referee: Farouk Houasnia

17 December 2011 Round 14	CS Constantine	3–2	ES Sétif	Constantine
15:00	Eguakun 11'; Dahmane 53' (pen.), 55'	Report	Aoudia 66', 76'	Stadium: Stade Mohamed Hamlaoui; Referee: Redouane Necib

24 December 2011 Round 15	ES Sétif	3–2	USM Alger	Sétif
18:00	Laïfaoui 8' (o.g.); Aoudia 59'; Benmoussa 90+7' (pen.)	Report	44' (pen.), 69' Djediat	Stadium: Stade 8 Mai 1945; Referee: Mohamed Benouza

21 January 2012 Round 16	NA Hussein Dey	1–2	ES Sétif	Hussein Dey
15:00	Khedis 90' (pen.)	Report	Aoudia 4', 8'	Stadium: Zioui Brothers Stadium; Referee: Farouk Houasnia

27 January 2012 Round 17	ES Sétif	0–1	MC Alger	Sétif
17:45		Report	Attafen 90'	Stadium: Stade 8 Mai 1945; Referee: Mehdi Abid Charef

31 January 2012 Round 18	JSM Béjaïa	2–3	ES Sétif	Béjaïa
15:00	Yélémou 40'; Belakhdar 67'	Report	Djabou 45+2', 55'; Aoudia 90+2'	Stadium: Stade de l'Unité Maghrébine; Referee: Mokhtar Amalou

4 February 2012 Round 19	ES Sétif	1–0	USM El Harrach	Sétif
17:45	Nadji 81'	Report		Stadium: Stade 8 Mai 1945; Referee: Redouane Necib

11 February 2012 Round 20	ASO Chlef	0–0	ES Sétif	Chlef
17:45		Report		Stadium: Stade Mohamed Boumezrag; Referee: Mohamed Bichari

3 March 2012 Round 21	ES Sétif	2–0	AS Khroub	Sétif
17:45	Aoudia 15'; Djabou 65'	Report		Stadium: Stade 8 Mai 1945; Referee: Merzak Halalchi

17 March 2012 Round 22	MC El Eulma	1–3	ES Sétif	El Eulma
15:00	Bouaïcha 42'	Report	Diss 49'; Benmoussa 70'; Ferrahi 79'	Stadium: Stade Messaoud Zougar; Referee: Mohamed Benouza

10 April 2012 Round 23	ES Sétif	0–2	CR Belouizdad	Sétif
18:45		Report	Kherbache 26'; Mekehout 90+1'	Stadium: Stade 8 Mai 1945; Referee: Farouk Mial

14 April 2012 Round 25	ES Sétif	1–1	MC Oran	Sétif
18:45	Benchadi 10'	Report	Dagoulou 62'	Stadium: Stade 8 Mai 1945; Referee: Mokhtar Amalou

24 April 2012 Round 24	CA Batna	1–0	ES Sétif	Batna
16:00	Merazka 90+3'	Report		Stadium: Mustapha Seffouhi Stadium; Referee: Sofiane Bousseter

28 April 2012 Round 26	WA Tlemcen	1–0	ES Sétif	Tlemcen
16:00	Andria 22'	Report		Stadium: Stade Akid Lotfi; Referee: Farouk Houasnia

5 May 2012 Round 27	ES Sétif	2–1	JS Kabylie	Sétif
16:00	Nadji 58'; Benmoussa 63' (pen.)	Report	Hanifi 81'	Stadium: Stade 8 Mai 1945; Referee: Mohamed Saïdi

8 May 2012 Round 28	MC Saïda	0–1	ES Sétif	Saida
16:00		Report	Benmoussa 47' (pen.)	Stadium: April 13, 1958 Stadium; Referee: Mohamed Bichari

15 May 2012 Round 29	ES Sétif	4–2	CS Constantine	Sétif
18:00	Lemaici 51' (o.g.); Benmoussa 64' (pen.); Djabou 70'; Ndaney 84'	Report	Dahmane 33'; Bouguerra 90+2'	Stadium: Stade 8 Mai 1945; Referee: Youssef Zerrouki

19 May 2012 Round 30	USM Alger	2–0	ES Sétif	Algiers
15:00	Benaldjia 8', 73'	Report		Stadium: Stade Omar Hammadi; Referee: Mohamed Amine Ghorbal

== Algerian Cup ==
30 December 2011 Round of 64	MC Oran	1–2	ES Sétif	Oran
14:30	Dagoulou 33'	Report	Delhoum 41'; Djabou 65'	Stadium: Ahmed Zabana Stadium; Referee: Bichari, Salaouadji, Bourouba

10 March 2012 Round of 32	IR Tébessa	0–2	ES Sétif	Tébessa
15:00		Report	Djabou 43'; Benmoussa 80' (pen.)	Stadium: March 4, 1956 Stadium; Referee: Habibatni, Guessoum, Boutaghane

10 March 2012 Round of 16	ES Sétif	4–2	JS Saoura	Sétif
15:00	Djabou 49'; Ndaney 51'; Benmoussa 54', 64'	Report	Zaïdi 33', 56'	Stadium: Stade 8 Mai 1945; Referee: Farouk Houasnia

30 March 2012 Quarter-finals	ES Sétif	3–1	CRB Aïn Oussera	Sétif
17:45	Djabou 13', 61'; Delhoum 87'	Report	Mokhtari 77'	Stadium: Stade 8 Mai 1945; Referee: Sahraoui, Naceri, Ayad

20 April 2012 Semi-finals	ES Sétif	3–2	USM El Harrach	Sétif
20:30	Benmoussa 14' (pen.); Ndaney 49'; Hachoud 69' (pen.)	Report	Ziane Cherif 6', 90+4' (pen.)	Stadium: Stade 8 Mai 1945; Referee: Mohamed Benouza

1 May 2012 Final	CR Belouizdad	1–2 (a.e.t.)	ES Sétif	Algiers
16:30	Ammour 82'	Report	Hachoud 22'; Benmoussa 96'	Stadium: Stade 5 Juillet 1962; Referee: Mokhtar Amalou

== Confederation Cup ==
=== First round ===
25 March 2012 first leg	Simba (Tanzania)	2–0	(Algeria) ES Sétif	Dar es Salaam
16:00 UTC+03:00	Okwi 77'; Sunzu 80'	Report		Stadium: Benjamin Mkapa National Stadium; Referee: Hudu Munyemana (Rwanda)

6 April 2012 Second leg	ES Sétif (Algeria)	3–1	(Tanzania) Simba	Sétif
18:00 UTC+01:00	Aoudia 34', 46'; Benmoussa 52'	Report	Okwi 90+3'	Stadium: Stade 8 Mai 1945; Referee: Mohamed Ben Hassana (Tunisia)

== Squad information ==
=== Playing statistics ===
No.	Pos	Nat	Player	Total		Ligue 1		Algerian Cup		Confederation Cup	
No.	Pos	Nat	Player	Apps	Goals	Apps	Goals	Apps	Goals	Apps	Goals
Goalkeepers
1	GK	(Algeria) ALG	Mohamed Benhamou	20	0	13	0	5	0	2	0
12	GK	(Algeria) ALG	Tarek Berguiga	5	0	4	0	1	0	0	0
19	GK	(Algeria) ALG	Nassim Benkhodja	15	0	14	0	1	0	0	0
Defenders
27	DF	(Algeria) ALG	Abderahmane Hachoud	26	10	19	8	5	2	2	0
5	DF	(Algeria) ALG	Smaïl Diss	25	3	21	3	2	0	2	0
2	DF	(Algeria) ALG	Riad Benchadi	26	1	20	1	4	0	2	0
20	DF	(Algeria) ALG	Mokhtar Megueni	24	1	17	1	5	0	2	0
11	DF	(Algeria) ALG	Mokhtar Benmoussa	34	14	26	8	6	5	2	1
	DF	(Algeria) ALG	Sofiane Bengoureïne	10	0	8	0	2	0	0	0
29	DF	(Algeria) ALG	Adel Lakhdari	19	0	15	0	4	0	0	0
	DF	(Algeria) ALG	Larroussi	1	0	0	0	0	0	1	0
Midfielders
7	MF	(Algeria) ALG	Kaled Gourmi	21	2	19	2	1	0	1	0
8	MF	(Algeria) ALG	Mourad Delhoum	30	2	24	0	4	2	2	0
6	MF	(Algeria) ALG	Farouk Belkaïd	31	0	24	0	5	0	2	0
10	MF	(Algeria) ALG	Abdelmoumene Djabou	34	13	28	8	6	5	0	0
21	MF	(Algeria) ALG	Sofiene Zaaboub	11	0	11	0	0	0	0	0
14	MF	(Algeria) ALG	Amir Karaoui	25	0	22	0	3	0	0	0
36	MF	(Algeria) ALG	Akram Djahnit	24	1	20	1	2	0	2	0
15	MF	(Algeria) ALG	Mohamed El Amine Tiouli	28	0	22	0	5	0	1	0
16	MF	(Algeria) ALG	Rachid Ferrahi	22	1	15	1	5	0	2	0
	MF	(Algeria) ALG	Malki	1	0	1	0	0	0	0	0
	MF	(Algeria) ALG	Houssameddine Aouf	1	0	1	0	0	0	0	0
	MF	(Burkina Faso) BFA	Kouamé Valentin	3	0	2	0	1	0	0	0
	MF	(Algeria) ALG	Lakhdar Bentaleb	5	0	3	0	2	0	0	0
Forwards
13	FW	(Algeria) ALG	Mohamed Amine Aoudia	22	14	20	12	1	0	1	2
	FW	(Algeria) ALG	Youssef Sofiane	7	0	4	0	1	0	2	0
17	FW	(Algeria) ALG	Youcef Ghazali	23	1	16	1	5	0	2	0
9	FW	(Ghana) GHA	Alex Asamoah	2	0	2	0	0	0	0	0
23	FW	(Algeria) ALG	Rachid Nadji	21	4	19	4	2	0	0	0
	FW	(Cameroon) CMR	Cyrille Ndaney	6	3	3	1	3	2	0	0
	FW	(Algeria) ALG	Abdelhakim Amokrane	1	0	1	0	0	0	0	0
Players transferred out during the season

Last updated: 19 November 2017
Source: fr.soccerway.com

=== Goalscorers ===
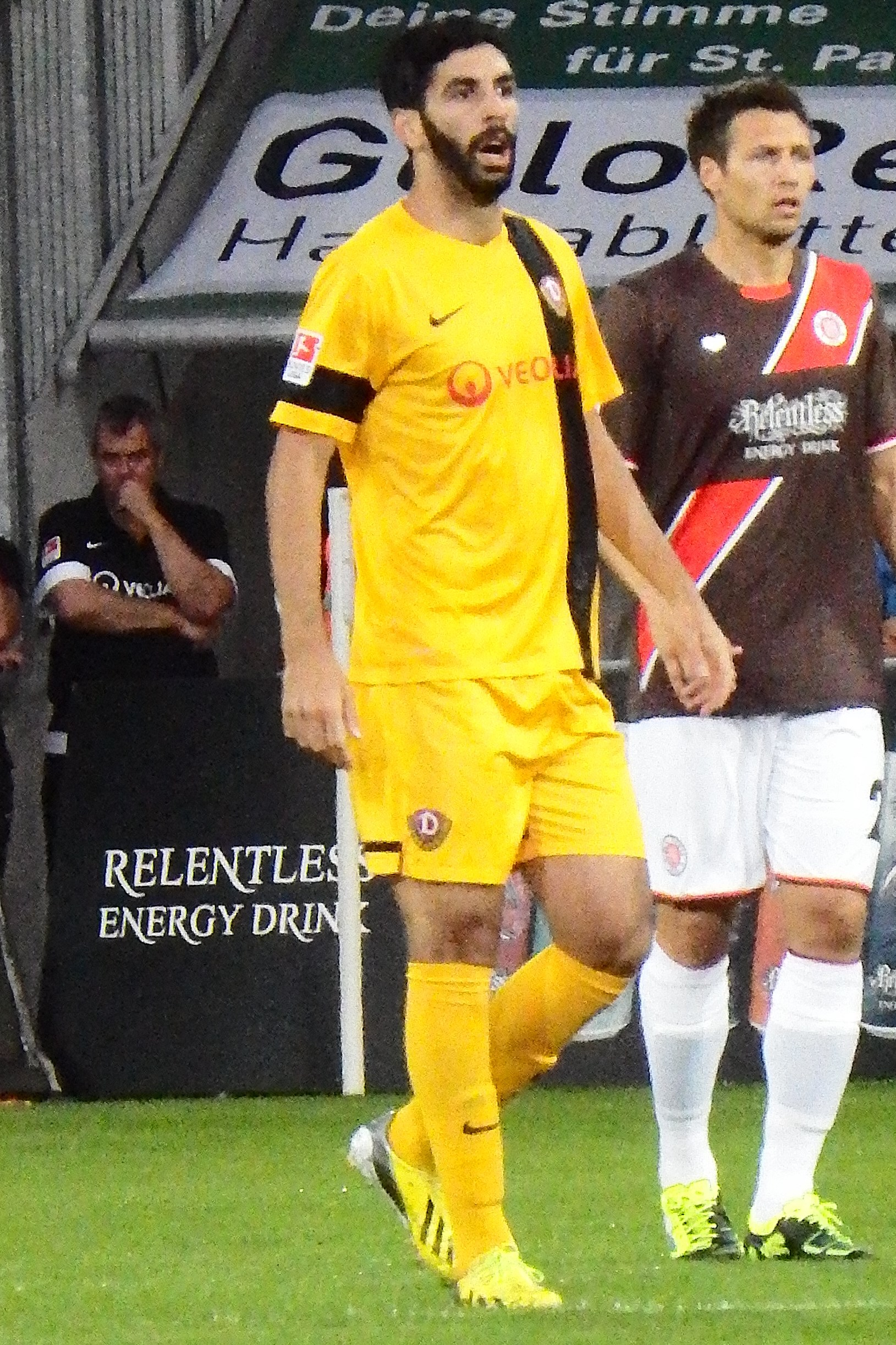
Mohamed Amine Aoudia is the team's top scorer this season with 14 goals share with Mokhtar Benmoussa including 12 in the Ligue 1 three goals behind the scorer Mohamed Messaoud.

Includes all competitive matches. The list is sorted alphabetically by surname when total goals are equal.

No.	Nat.	Player	Pos.	Ligue 1	Algerian Cup	Confederation Cup	TOTAL
13	(Algeria)	Mohamed Amine Aoudia	FW	12	0	2	14
11	(Algeria)	Mokhtar Benmoussa	DF	8	5	1	14
10	(Algeria)	Abdelmoumene Djabou	MF	8	5	0	13
27	(Algeria)	Abderahmane Hachoud	DF	8	2	0	10
23	(Algeria)	Rachid Nadji	FW	4	0	0	4
	(Cameroon)	Cyrille Ndaney	MF	1	2	0	3
5	(Algeria)	Smaïl Diss	MF	3	0	0	3
8	(Algeria)	Mourad Delhoum	MF	0	2	0	2
7	(Algeria)	Kaled Gourmi	MF	2	0	0	2
2	(Algeria)	Riad Benchadi	DF	1	0	0	1
16	(Algeria)	Rachid Ferrahi	MF	1	0	0	1
36	(Algeria)	Akram Djahnit	MF	1	0	0	1
17	(Algeria)	Youcef Ghazali	FW	1	0	0	1
20	(Algeria)	Mokhtar Megueni	DF	1	0	0	1
Own Goals				2	0	0	2
Totals				53	16	3	72

== Transfers ==
=== In ===
Date	Pos	Player	From club	Transfer fee	Source
1 July 2011	GK	(Algeria) Nassim Benkhodja	AS Khroub	Undisclosed	
1 July 2011	DF	(Algeria) Adel Lakhdari	US Biskra	Undisclosed	
1 July 2011	MF	(Algeria) Lakhdar Bentaleb	ASM Oran	Undisclosed	
1 July 2011	MF	(Algeria) Rachid Ferrahi	ES Mostaganem	Undisclosed	
1 July 2011	MF	(Cameroon) Cyrille Ndaney	(Kenya) Sofapaka	Undisclosed	
1 July 2011	FW	(Algeria) Rachid Nadji	NARB Réghaïa	Undisclosed	
1 July 2011	FW	(Ghana) Alex Asamoah	(Ghana) Ashanti Gold SC	Undisclosed	
20 July 2011	MF	(Algeria) Amir Karaoui	MC El Eulma	Undisclosed	
31 July 2011	FW	(Algeria) Mohamed Amine Aoudia	(Egypt) Zamalek	€100,000	
19 August 2011	MF	(Algeria) Kaled Gourmi	(Switzerland) Yverdon-Sport	Free transfer	
1 January 2012	DF	(Algeria) Sofiane Bengoureïne	MC Oran	Undisclosed	
1 January 2012	MF	(Algeria) Youssef Sofiane	MC Alger	Undisclosed	

=== Out ===
Date	Pos	Player	To club	Transfer fee	Source
6 July 2011	MF	(Algeria) Hocine Metref	JS Kabylie	Free transfer	
10 July 2011	DF	(Algeria) Mohamed Yekhlef	USM Alger	Free transfer	
11 July 2011	MF	(Algeria) Bouazza Feham	USM Alger	Free transfer	
13 July 2011	FW	(Algeria) Nabil Hemani	JS Kabylie	Free transfer	
21 July 2011	GK	(Algeria) Faouzi Chaouchi	MC Alger	Free transfer	
26 July 2011	DF	(Algeria) Abdelkader Laïfaoui	USM Alger	Free transfer	
30 July 2011	MF	(Algeria) Khaled Lemmouchia	USM Alger	Free transfer	
