= 2011–12 AS Khroub season =

AS Khroub
2011–12 season
- Chairman: Abdelali Mohamed (from 25 August 2011)
- Head coach: Lamine Boughrara (until 19 October 2011); El Hadi Khezzar (from 22 October 2011) (until 19 February 2012); Azzedine Aït Djoudi (from 19 February 2012)
- Stadium: Abed Hamdani Stadium, El Khroub
- Ligue 1: 14th
- Algerian Cup: Round of 16
- Top goalscorer: League: Oussama Mesfar (6); All: Oussama Mesfar (7)

In the 2011–12 season, AS Khroub is competing in the Ligue 1 for the 5th season, as well as the Algerian Cup. They will be competing in Ligue 1, and the Algerian Cup.

== Squad list ==
Players and squad numbers last updated on 18 November 2011.
Note: Flags indicate national team as has been defined under FIFA eligibility rules. Players may hold more than one non-FIFA nationality.

No.	Nat.	Position	Name	Date of Birth (Age)	Signed from
Goalkeepers
Defenders
Midfielders
Forwards

== Competitions ==
=== Overview ===
Competition	Record								Started round	Final position / round	First match	Last match
Competition	G	W	D	L	GF	GA	GD	Win %	Started round	Final position / round	First match	Last match
Ligue 1	30	7	10	13	23	46	−23	23.33	—N/a	14th	10 September 2011	19 May 2012
Algerian Cup	3	2	0	1	2	2	+0	66.67	Round of 64	Round of 16	30 December 2011	9 March 2012
Total	33	9	10	14	25	48	−23	27.27				

Updated to match played 3 June 2019
Source: Competitions

== League table ==
Pos	Team	Pld	W	D	L	GF	GA	GD	Pts	Qualification or relegation
12	CS Constantine	30	8	12	10	35	42	−7	36	
13	MC Oran	30	9	8	13	38	51	−13	35	
14	AS Khroub (R)	30	7	10	13	23	46	−23	31	Relegation to Ligue Professionnelle 2
15	NA Hussein Dey (R)	30	5	11	14	29	39	−10	26	Relegation to Ligue Professionnelle 2
16	MC Saïda (R)	30	6	6	18	28	46	−18	24	Relegation to Ligue Professionnelle 2

Updated to match(es) played on 19 April 2018. Source: DZFoot
Rules for classification: 1) points; 2) head-to-head points; 3) head-to-head goal difference; 4) goal difference; 5) total goals; 6) fairplay ranking; 7) playoff.
(R) Relegated

=== Results summary ===
Overall								Home						Away					
Pld	W	D	L	GF	GA	GD	Pts	W	D	L	GF	GA	GD	W	D	L	GF	GA	GD
0	0	0	0	0	0	0	0	0	0	0	0	0	0	0	0	0	0	0	0

Last updated: 22 April 2018.
Source: Competitive matches

=== Results by round ===
Round	1	2	3	4	5	6	7	8	9	10	11	12	13	14	15	16	17	18	19	20	21	22	23	24	25	26	27	28	29	30
Ground	A	H	A	H	A	H	A	H	A	H	A	H	A	A	H	H	A	H	A	H	A	H	A	H	A	H	A	H	H	A
Result	D	D	W	W	L	D	L	D	D	W	L	W	D	D	D	L	L	W	L	D	L	W	L	W	L	W	D	L	L	L
Position																														14

Source: Competitive matches
A = Away; H = Home; W = Win; D = Draw; L = Loss

=== Matches ===
Win Draw Loss

10 September 2011 Round 1	WA Tlemcen	1–1	AS Khroub	Tlemcen
20:00	Traoré 45+2'	Report	Mesfar 33' (pen.)	Stadium: Stade Akid Lotfi; Referee: Mohamed Babou

17 September 2011 Round 2	AS Khroub	1–1	MC Oran	El Khroub
19:00	Mesfar 35'	Report	Leghzal 86'	Stadium: Abed Hamdani Stadium; Referee: Mokhtar Amalou

24 September 2011 Round 3	USM Alger	2–0	AS Khroub	Algiers
18:00	Laïfaoui 22'; Djediat 45'	Report		Stadium: Stade Omar Hammadi; Referee: Mohamed Babou

1 October 2011 Round 4	AS Khroub	1–0	MC Saïda	El Khroub
18:00	Mesfar 46' (pen.)	Report		Stadium: Abed Hamdani Stadium; Referee: Khaled Saâdi

15 October 2011 Round 5	JS Kabylie	1–0	AS Khroub	Tizi Ouzou
18:00	Hanifi 1'	Report		Stadium: Stade du 1er Novembre 1954; Referee: Mohamed Amine Ghorbal

22 October 2011 Round 6	AS Khroub	2–2	ES Sétif	El Khroub
19:00	Bounab 23'; Koffi 65'	Report	Diss 3'; Nadji 69'	Stadium: Abed Hamdani Stadium; Referee: Mokhtar Amalou

29 October 2011 Round 7	CS Constantine	2–1	AS Khroub	Constantine
17:00	Dahmane 42', 59'	Report	Amada 65'	Stadium: Stade Mohamed Hamlaoui; Referee: Merzak Halalchi

4 November 2011 Round 8	AS Khroub	0–0	JSM Béjaïa	El Khroub
18:00		Report		Stadium: Abed Hamdani Stadium; Referee: Redouane Necib

19 November 2011 Round 9	NA Hussein Dey	1–1	AS Khroub	Hussein Dey
18:00	El Okbi 70'	Report	Benamokrane 29'	Stadium: Zioui Brothers Stadium; Referee: Bouaza Chenane

22 November 2011 Round 10	AS Khroub	2–1	MC Alger	El Khroub
15:00	Bakha 8' (pen.); Chaïb 18'	Report	Daoudi 30'	Stadium: Abed Hamdani Stadium; Referee: Mohamed Benouza

26 November 2011 Round 11	ASO Chlef	2–0	AS Khroub	Chlef
18:00	Hamidi 82', 90'	Report		Stadium: Stade Mohamed Boumezrag; Referee: Said Aouina

3 December 2011 Round 12	AS Khroub	1–0	USM El Harrach	El Khroub
15:00	Belaïli 87'	Report		Stadium: Abed Hamdani Stadium; Referee: Mohamed Sahraoui

10 December 2011 Round 13	CA Batna	0–0	AS Khroub	Batna
15:00		Report		Stadium: Mustapha Seffouhi Stadium; Referee: Rafik Achouri

17 December 2011 Round 14	MC El Eulma	1–1	AS Khroub	El Eulma
15:00	Belakhdar 34'	Report	Mesfar 49'	Stadium: Stade Messaoud Zougar; Referee: Merzak Halalchi

24 December 2011 Round 15	AS Khroub	0–0	CR Belouizdad	El Khroub
15:00		Report		Stadium: Abed Hamdani Stadium; Referee: Farouk Mial

21 January 2012 Round 16	AS Khroub	0–2	WA Tlemcen	El Khroub
14:00		Report	Sameur 10' (pen.); Andria 27'	Stadium: Stade Abed Hamdani; Referee: Mokhtar Amalou

28 January 2012 Round 17	MC Oran	3–0	AS Khroub	Oran
15:00	Belaïli 50', 75'; Sandaogo 73'	Report		Stadium: Stade Ahmed Zabana; Referee: Sofiane Bousseter

31 January 2012 Round 18	AS Khroub	1–0	USM Alger	El Khroub
15:00	Bounab 65'	Report		Stadium: Stade Abed Hamdani; Referee: Boubekeur Zouaoui

4 February 2012 Round 19	MC Saïda	6–1	AS Khroub	Saida
15:00	Sayah 16'; Madouni 31', 53', 73'; Teguedi 84'; Zaoui 90+3'	Report	Belaïli 58'	Stadium: April 13, 1958 Stadium; Referee: Mohamed Babou

18 February 2012 Round 20	AS Khroub	0–0	JS Kabylie	El Khroub
15:00		Report		Stadium: Abed Hamdani Stadium; Referee: Mohamed Sahraoui

3 March 2012 Round 21	ES Sétif	2–0	AS Khroub	Sétif
17:45	Aoudia 15'; Djabou 65'	Report		Stadium: Stade 8 Mai 1945; Referee: Merzak Halalchi

17 March 2012 Round 22	AS Khroub	3–0	CS Constantine	El Khroub
15:00	Mesfar 26' (pen.), 80'; Belaïli 51'	Report		Stadium: Abed Hamdani Stadium; Referee: Bouaza Chenane

27 March 2012 Round 23	JSM Béjaïa	2–0	AS Khroub	Béjaïa
16:00	Gasmi 20'; Derrag 70'	Report		Stadium: Stade de l'Unité Maghrébine; Referee: Mohamed Amine Ghorbal

7 April 2012 Round 24	AS Khroub	2–1	NA Hussein Dey	El Khroub
16:00	Boukhiar 35'; Benamokrane 86'	Report	Ouhadda 29'	Stadium: Abed Hamdani Stadium; Referee: Mohamed Saïdi

14 April 2012 Round 25	MC Alger	3–1	AS Khroub	Algiers
17:45	Hadji 14'; Ghazi 32'; Sayah 57'	Report	Bounab 49'	Stadium: Stade 5 Juillet 1962; Referee: Youssef Zerrouki

2 May 2012 Round 26	AS Khroub	1–0	ASO Chlef	El Khroub
16:00	Bakha 64' (pen.)	Report		Stadium: Abed Hamdani Stadium; Referee: Mohamed Bichari

5 May 2012 Round 27	USM El Harrach	1–1	AS Khroub	Algiers
15:00	Tatem 76'	Report	Mechac 17'	Stadium: Stade 1er Novembre 1954; Referee: Said Aouina

8 May 2012 Round 28	AS Khroub	0–3	CA Batna	El Khroub
15:00		Report	Messadia 8'; Saidi 61'; Mani 74'	Stadium: Abed Hamdani Stadium; Referee: Merzak Halalchi

15 May 2012 Round 29	AS Khroub	1–5	MC El Eulma	El Khroub
15:00	Belaïli 56'	Report	Tiaïba 42', 44'; Hebbaïche 45+5' (pen.); Bentayeb 73'; Kadri 90+3'	Stadium: Abed Hamdani Stadium; Referee: Sofiane Bousseter

19 May 2012 Round 30	CR Belouizdad	4–1	AS Khroub	Belouizdad
18:00	Amroune 32'; Oudira 50'; Hamzaoui 52'; Tafat 82'	Report	Bouras 11'	Stadium: Stade 20 Août 1955; Referee: Farouk Mial

== Algerian Cup ==
30 December 2011 Round of 64	AS Khroub	1–0	NA Hussein Dey	El Khroub
14:30	Mesfar 41'	Report		Stadium: Abed Hamdani Stadium; Referee: Ghorbal, Meknous, Cherchar

25 February 2012 Round of 32	AS Khroub	1–0	MC El Eulma	El Khroub
15:00	Boudar 48'	Report		Stadium: Abed Hamdani Stadium; Referee: Redouane Necib

9 March 2012 Round of 16	CS Constantine	2–0	AS Khroub	Constantine
15:00	Hadjadj 52'; Bezzaz 82'	Report		Stadium: Stade Mohamed Hamlaoui; Referee: Mokhtar Amalou

== Squad information ==
=== Playing statistics ===
No.	Pos	Nat	Player	Total		Ligue 1		Algerian Cup	
No.	Pos	Nat	Player	Apps	Goals	Apps	Goals	Apps	Goals
Goalkeepers
19	GK	(Algeria) ALG	Abderrahmane Boutrig	14	0	13	0	1	0
12	GK	(Algeria) ALG	Hassane Toual	15	0	14	0	1	0
22	GK	(Algeria) ALG	Mokhtar Boualem Benmalek	4	0	3	0	1	0
Defenders
	DF	(Algeria) ALG	Réda Ârâr	19	0	18	0	1	0
2	DF	(Algeria) ALG	Abdelaziz Hamedi	10	0	10	0	0	0
16	DF	(Algeria) ALG	Mehdi Boudaoud	18	0	17	0	1	0
25	DF	(Algeria) ALG	Rabah Ziad	28	0	25	0	3	0
	DF	(Algeria) ALG	Kheireddine Boukhiar	10	1	8	1	2	0
5	DF	(Algeria) ALG	Touhami Sebie	22	0	22	0	0	0
3	DF	(Algeria) ALG	Charaf Eddine Haloui	2	0	2	0	0	0
	DF	(Algeria) ALG	Amir Belaili	22	4	20	4	2	0
	DF	(Algeria) ALG	Brahim Menzeri	21	0	20	0	1	0
	DF	(Algeria) ALG	Khaled Bouhakak	1	0	1	0	0	0
Midfielders
6	MF	(Algeria) ALG	Khelifa Bakha	24	2	21	2	3	0
	MF	(Algeria) ALG	Mehdi Boudar	14	1	12	0	2	1
14	MF	(Algeria) ALG	Lamara Douicher	29	0	26	0	3	0
23	MF	(Algeria) ALG	Rachid Mehaia	15	0	14	0	1	0
18	MF	(Algeria) ALG	Sofiane Chaïb	21	1	19	1	2	0
17	MF	(Algeria) ALG	Hamza Bounab	28	3	25	3	3	0
21	MF	(Algeria) ALG	Oussama Zouak	24	0	22	0	2	0
26	MF	(Madagascar) MAD	Ibrahim Amada	15	1	13	1	2	0
	MF	(Algeria) ALG	Hichem Maanser	6	0	6	0	0	0
24	MF	(Algeria) ALG	Djamel Bouras	2	1	2	1	0	0
9	MF	(Algeria) ALG	Ghanem Bellatar	2	0	2	0	0	0
	MF	(Algeria) ALG	Nadhir Korichi	5	0	5	0	0	0
	MF	(Algeria) ALG	Moustapha Kerdjioui	1	0	1	0	0	0
	MF	(Algeria) ALG	Mohamed Hamici	1	0	1	0	0	0
Forwards
20	FW	(Algeria) ALG	Toufik Benamokrane	22	2	21	2	1	0
	FW	(Algeria) ALG	Hichem Souakir	8	0	6	0	2	0
7	FW	(Algeria) ALG	Oussama Mesfar	27	7	24	6	3	1
27	FW	(Ivory Coast) CIV	Mechac Koffi	21	2	20	2	1	0
	FW	(Algeria) ALG	Yakoub Oumergab	1	0	1	0	0	0
Players transferred out during the season

Last updated: 25 November 2017
Source: fr.soccerway.com

== Transfers ==
=== In ===
Date	Pos	Player	from club	Transfer fee	Source
1 July 2011	GK	(Algeria) Mokhtar Boualem Benmalek	ES Sétif	Free transfer	
1 July 2011	DF	(Algeria) Brahim Menzeri	USM Annaba	Free transfer	
1 July 2011	MF	(Algeria) Lamara Douicher	JS Kabylie	Free transfer	
1 July 2011	MF	(Madagascar) Ibrahim Amada	JS Kabylie	Free transfer	
1 July 2011	MF	(Algeria) Sofiane Chaïb	WA Tlemcen	Free transfer	
1 July 2011	MF	(Algeria) Ghanem Bellatar	AS Ain M'lila	Free transfer	
1 July 2011	MF	(Algeria) Nadhir Korichi	AS Khroub U21	—N/a	
1 July 2011	MF	(Algeria) Hichem Maanser	AS Khroub U21	—N/a	
18 July 2011	MF	(Algeria) Khelifa Bakha	CA Bordj Bou Arreridj	Free transfer	
20 July 2011	GK	(Algeria) Abderrahmane Boutrig	MC El Eulma	Free transfer	
23 July 2011	FW	(Algeria) Toufik Benamokrane	MC El Eulma	Free transfer	
23 July 2011	MF	(Algeria) Rachid Mehaia	MC El Eulma	Free transfer	
22 August 2011	FW	(Ivory Coast) Mechac Koffi	(Morocco) OC Khouribga	Free transfer	
1 December 2011	DF	(Algeria) Kheireddine Boukhiar	WA Tlemcen	Free transfer	
1 January 2012	DF	(Algeria) Khaled Bouhakak	AS Khroub U21	—N/a	
1 January 2012	MF	(Algeria) Mehdi Boudar	USM Annaba	Leon	
1 January 2012	FW	(Algeria) Hichem Souakir	NA Hussein Dey	Leon	

=== Out ===
Date	Pos	Player	To club	Transfer fee	Source
1 July 2011	GK	(Algeria) Nassim Benkhodja	ES Sétif	Undisclosed	
1 July 2011	FW	(Algeria) Omar Bellagra	MC El Eulma	Free transfer	
1 July 2011	FW	(Algeria) Khalid Leghzal	MC Oran	Free transfer	
15 July 2011	FW	(Algeria) Hichem Souakir	NA Hussein Dey	Free transfer	
8 August 2011	MF	(Cameroon) Gilles Ngomo	CS Constantine	Free transfer	
