= 2010–11 JSM Béjaïa season =

JSM Béjaïa
2010–11 season
- Chairman: Boualem Tiab
- Head coach: Djamel Menad
- Stadium: Stade de l'Unité Maghrébine
- Ligue 1: Runners-up
- Algerian Cup: Round of 16
- Top goalscorer: League: Yannick N'Djeng (14 goal); All: Yannick N'Djeng (14 goal)
Home colours	Away colours	Third colours

In the 2010–11 season, JSM Béjaïa competed in the Ligue 1 for the 11th season, as well as the Algerian Cup. They competed in Ligue 1 and the Algerian Cup.

== Squad list ==
Players and squad numbers last updated on 18 November 2010.
Note: Flags indicate national team as has been defined under FIFA eligibility rules. Players may hold more than one non-FIFA nationality.

No.	Nat.	Position	Name	Date of birth (age)	Signed from
Goalkeepers
16	(Algeria)	GK	Yacine Djebarat	27 January 1981 (aged 29)	(Algeria) MO Bejaia
1	(Algeria)	GK	Ahmed Walid Chouih	10 February 1983 (aged 27)	(Algeria) MC Saida
12	(Algeria)	GK	Cédric Si Mohamed	9 January 1985 (aged 25)	(France) FC Montceau
Defenders
4	(Algeria)	CB	Sofian Kheyari	27 January 1984 (aged 26)	(France) SO Cassis Carnoux
28	(Algeria)	LB	Amar Bellakhdar	20 January 1980 (aged 30)	(Algeria) CR Belouizdad
15	(Algeria)	CB	Zidane Mebarakou	3 January 1989 (aged 21)	(Algeria) Youth system
23	(Algeria)	CB	Adel Maïza	18 March 1983 (aged 27)	(Algeria) USM Annaba
18	(Algeria)	RB	Amine Megateli	4 May 1987 (aged 23)	(Algeria) Olympique de Médéa
30	(Algeria)	RB	Mohamed Rabie Meftah	5 May 1985 (aged 25)	(Algeria) JS Kabylie
13	(Algeria)	CB	Brahim Zafour	30 November 1977 (aged 33)	(Algeria) JS Kabylie
Midfielders
27	(Algeria)	AM	Nassim Boukemacha	26 September 1987 (aged 23)	(Algeria) Youth system
21	(Algeria)	MF	Mehdi Bouderadji	3 October 1990 (aged 20)	(Algeria) Youth system
6	(Algeria)	MF	Nassim Hamlaoui	25 August 1981 (aged 29)	(Algeria) USM Annaba
14	(Algeria)	DM	Mehdi Kacem	8 August 1986 (aged 24)	(Algeria) ES Sétif
10	(Algeria)	DM	Mehdi Boudar	2 March 1980 (aged 30)	(Algeria) USM Annaba
32	(Algeria)	AM	Zahir Zerdab	9 January 1982 (aged 28)	(Belgium) Zulte Waregem
9	(Algeria)	DM	Antar Boucherit	18 December 1983 (aged 27)	(Algeria) ES Sétif
7	(Algeria)	AM	Ahmed Ait Ouarab	7 August 1979 (aged 31)	(Greece) Olympiakos Nicosia
	(Algeria)	AM	Karim Kaddour	6 June 1983 (aged 27)	(Algeria) ES Sétif
11	(Algeria)	DM	Tayeb Maroci	1 June 1985 (aged 25)	(Algeria) JS Kabylie
Forwards
23	(Algeria)	FW	Mohamed Lamine Aourès	22 January 1990 (aged 20)	(Algeria) Youth system
22	(Algeria)	FW	Tahar Bouraba	28 June 1984 (aged 26)	(Algeria) ASM Oran
17	(Algeria)	FW	Rafik Boulaïnceur	11 December 1991 (aged 19)	(Algeria) Youth system
25	(Cameroon)	FW	Yannick N'Djeng	11 March 1990 (aged 20)	(Cameroon) Canon Yaoundé
20	(Algeria)	AM	Abdelhakim Laref	12 January 1985 (aged 25)	(Belgium) Eendracht Zele
8	(Algeria)	FW	Ahmed Gasmi	22 November 1984 (aged 26)	(Algeria) USM Annaba

== Competitions ==
=== Overview ===
Competition	Record								Started round	Final position / round	First match	Last match
Competition	G	W	D	L	GF	GA	GD	Win %	Started round	Final position / round	First match	Last match
Ligue 1	30	14	8	8	47	32	+15	46.67	—N/a	Runners-up	25 September 2010	8 July 2011
Algerian Cup	3	1	2	0	2	0	+2	33.33	Round of 64	Round of 16	31 December 2010	25 March 2011
Total	33	15	10	8	49	32	+17	45.45				

Updated to match played 9 May 2017
Source: Competitions

== League table ==
Pos	Team	Pld	W	D	L	GF	GA	GD	Pts	Qualification or relegation
1	ASO Chlef (C)	30	19	6	5	51	20	+31	63	Qualification for the Champions League preliminary round
2	JSM Béjaïa	30	14	8	8	47	32	+15	50	Qualification for the Champions League preliminary round
3	ES Sétif	30	12	11	7	43	31	+12	47	Qualification for the Confederation Cup preliminary round
4	USM El Harrach	30	12	10	8	36	31	+5	46	
5	CR Belouizdad	30	12	9	9	33	26	+7	45	

Updated to match(es) played on 19 April 2018. Source: DZFoot
Rules for classification: 1) points; 2) head-to-head points; 3) head-to-head goal difference; 4) goal difference; 5) total goals; 6) fairplay ranking; 7) playoff.
(C) Champions

=== Results summary ===
Overall								Home						Away					
Pld	W	D	L	GF	GA	GD	Pts	W	D	L	GF	GA	GD	W	D	L	GF	GA	GD
30	14	8	8	47	32	+15	50	10	3	2	30	12	+18	4	5	6	17	20	−3

Last updated: 29 December 2014.
Source: Competitive matches

=== Results by round ===
Round	1	2	3	4	5	6	7	8	9	10	11	12	13	14	15	16	17	18	19	20	21	22	23	24	25	26	27	28	29	30
Ground	H	A	H	A	H	H	A	H	A	H	A	H	A	H	A	A	H	A	H	A	A	H	A	H	A	H	A	H	A	H
Result	W	L	W	W	L	W	D	W	L	W	D	D	L	D	D	L	W	W	W	D	L	L	D	W	W	D	L	W	W	W
Position	1	4	2	2	4	4	5	3	4	3	3	4	7	6	6	7	5	4	3	3	4	5	7	5	3	5	5	3	2	2

Source: Competitive matches
A = Away; H = Home; W = Win; D = Draw; L = Loss

=== Matches ===
Win Draw Loss

24 September 2010 Round 1	JSM Béjaïa	4–1	ASO Chlef	Béjaïa
20:00	Zerdab 17', 43'; Kacem 46'; Maïza 81'	Soccerway report	Messaoud 65'	Stadium: Stade de l'Unité Maghrébine; Referee: Mehdi Abid Charef

1 October 2010 Round 2	USM Annaba	1–0	JSM Béjaïa	Annaba
20:00	Bakrar 29'	Soccerway report		Stadium: Stade 19 Mai 1956; Referee: Farouk Houasnia

15 October 2010 Round 3	JSM Béjaïa	2–0	ES Sétif	Béjaïa
20:00	Zerdab 2', 46'	Soccerway report		Stadium: Stade de l'Unité Maghrébine; Referee: Mohamed Bichari

23 October 2010 Round 4	USM Alger	2–3	JSM Béjaïa	Bologhine
16:00	Ghazi 17'; Daham 56'	Soccerway report	54' Gasmi; 66' (pen.), 90+1' Meftah	Stadium: Omar Hamadi Stadium; Referee: Mokhtar Amalou

26 October 2010 Round 5	JSM Béjaïa	0–1	WA Tlemcen	Béjaïa
16:00		Soccerway report	Hadji 69'	Stadium: Stade de l'Unité Maghrébine; Referee: Rafik Achouri

29 October 2010 Round 6	JSM Béjaïa	4–2	JS Kabylie	Béjaïa
16:00	Meftah 34'; Rial 45' (o.g.); Bouraba 62'; Maïza 82'	Soccerway report	Hamiti 40' (pen.), 58'	Stadium: Stade de l'Unité Maghrébine; Referee: Djamel Haimoudi

6 November 2010 Round 7	USM El Harrach	3–3	JSM Béjaïa	Algiers
14:30	Boumechra 3', 42'; Kabla 85'	Soccerway report	Maroci 22'; N'Djeng 38' (pen.), 63'	Stadium: Stade 1er Novembre 1954; Referee: Farouk Houasnia

30 November 2010 Round 8	JSM Béjaïa	4–0	MC Saïda	Béjaïa
18:00	Maïza 5'; N'Djeng 50', 84'; Gasmi 66'	Soccerway report		Stadium: Stade de l'Unité Maghrébine; Referee: Sofiane Bousseter

27 November 2010 Round 9	USM Blida	1–0	JSM Béjaïa	Blida
14:30	Harizi 27' (pen.)	Soccerway report		Stadium: Stade Mustapha Tchaker; Referee: Mohamed Bichari

3 December 2010 Round 10	JSM Béjaïa	5–2	MC El Eulma	Béjaïa
18:00	Gasmi 1', 11'; Zerdab 23'; N'Djeng 31' (pen.); Megateli 37'	Soccerway report	Djillali 48'; Benamokrane 82'	Stadium: Stade de l'Unité Maghrébine; Referee: Mohamed Haddada

4 January 2011 Round 11	MC Alger	0–0	JSM Béjaïa	Belouizdad
18:00		Soccerway report		Stadium: Stade 20 Août 1955; Referee: Mehdi Abid Charef

17 December 2011 Round 12	JSM Béjaïa	0–0	AS Khroub	Béjaïa
18:00		Soccerway report		Stadium: Stade de l'Unité Maghrébine; Referee: Djamel Haimoudi

24 December 2010 Round 13	MC Oran	2–1	JSM Béjaïa	Oran
15:00	Aouedj 45'; Belaïli 84'	Soccerway report	N'Djeng 67' (pen.)	Stadium: Ahmed Zabana Stadium; Attendance: 0 (close doors); Referee: Boubekeur Zouaoui

8 March 2011 Round 14	JSM Béjaïa	1–1	CR Belouizdad	Béjaïa
14:30	Meftah 86' (pen.)	Soccerway report	Mammeri 87'	Stadium: Stade de l'Unité Maghrébine; Referee: Mohamed Benouza

11 March 2011 Round 15	CA Bordj Bou Arreridj	2–2	JSM Béjaïa	Bordj Bou Arréridj
18:00	Benchaïra 55'; Dehouche 76'	Soccerway report	N'Djeng 33', 62'	Stadium: Stade 20 Août 1955; Referee: Mohamed Bichari

19 March 2011 Round 16	ASO Chlef	2–0	JSM Béjaïa	Chlef
18:00	Soudani 53'; Messaoud 76'	Soccerway report		Stadium: Stade Mohamed Boumezrag; Referee: Mohamed Haddada

29 March 2011 Round 17	JSM Béjaïa	1–0	USM Annaba	Béjaïa
15:30	N'Djeng 76'	Soccerway report		Stadium: Stade de l'Unité Maghrébine; Referee: Bouaza Chenane

17 May 2011 Round 18	ES Sétif	1–2	JSM Béjaïa	Sétif
19:00	Hemani 57' (pen.)	Soccerway report	N'Djeng 4'; Bouraba 90+4'	Stadium: Stade 8 Mai 1945; Referee: Mohamed Benouza

15 April 2011 Round 19	JSM Béjaïa	3–2	USM Alger	Béjaïa
18:00	Gasmi 11', 21'; N'Djeng 37'	Soccerway report	Daham 59', 77'	Stadium: Stade de l'Unité Maghrébine; Referee: Rafik Achouri

25 April 2011 Round 20	WA Tlemcen	1–1	JSM Béjaïa	Tlemcen
17:00	Sameur 21'	Soccerway report	Megateli 41'	Stadium: Stade Akid Lotfi; Referee: Mehdi Abid Charef

6 June 2011 Round 21	JS Kabylie	1–0	JSM Béjaïa	Tizi Ouzou
19:00	Nessakh 43'	Soccerway report		Stadium: Stade 1er Novembre 1954; Attendance: 0 (close doors); Referee: Mohamed Babou

13 May 2011 Round 22	JSM Béjaïa	0–2	USM El Harrach	Béjaïa
20:00		Soccerway report	Boualem 25'; Boumechra 85'	Stadium: Stade de l'Unité Maghrébine; Referee: Sofiane Bousseter

21 May 2011 Round 23	MC Saïda	0–0	JSM Béjaïa	Saida
17:00		Soccerway report		Stadium: April 13, 1958 Stadium; Referee: Boubekeur Zouaoui

27 May 2011 Round 24	JSM Béjaïa	1–0	USM Blida	Béjaïa
20:00	N'Djeng 69'	Soccerway report		Stadium: Stade de l'Unité Maghrébine; Referee: Farouk Houasnia

31 May 2011 Round 25	MC El Eulma	0–2	JSM Béjaïa	El Eulma
17:00		Soccerway report	N'Djeng 66', 81'	Stadium: Stade Messaoud Zougar; Attendance: 0 (close doors); Referee: Youssef Zerrouki

11 June 2011 Round 26	JSM Béjaïa	1–1	MC Alger	Béjaïa
20:00	Maïza 30'	Soccerway report	Bouchema 89'	Stadium: Stade de l'Unité Maghrébine; Referee: Mohamed Benouza

25 June 2011 Round 27	AS Khroub	4–2	JSM Béjaïa	El Khroub
18:00	Boutnaf 2'; Mesfar 8' (pen.); Hamedi 52'; Megateli 72' (o.g.)	Soccerway report	Meftah 5'; Boulaïnceur 6'	Stadium: Stade Abed Hamdani; Referee: Mohamed Bichari

28 June 2011 Round 28	JSM Béjaïa	1–0	MC Oran	Béjaïa
18:00	Gasmi 54'	Soccerway report		Stadium: Stade de l'Unité Maghrébine; Referee: Merzak Halalchi

1 July 2011 Round 29	CR Belouizdad	0–1	JSM Béjaïa	Belouizdad
18:00		Soccerway report	Zerdab 26'	Stadium: Stade 20 Août 1955; Referee: Mehdi Abid Charef

8 July 2011 Round 30	JSM Béjaïa	3–0	CA Bordj Bou Arreridj	Béjaïa
18:00	Megateli 31'; Meftah 45+1'; Gasmi 66'	Soccerway report		Stadium: Stade de l'Unité Maghrébine; Referee: Habibatni

== Algerian Cup ==
31 December 2010 Round of 64	AS Aïn M'lila	0–0 (a.e.t.) (5–6 p)	JSM Béjaïa	Aïn M'lila
14:15		Report		Stadium: Stade des Frères Demane-Debbih
Note: Lineup for JSM Béjaïa - Chouih - Meftah, Mebarakou, Zafour, Megateli - Kacem (Maïza 109’), Kheyari, Boukemacha, Boudar (Boulaïncer 57’) - Aourés (Gasmi 50’), N’Djeng.

5 March 2011 Round of 32	JSM Béjaïa	2–0	USM Blida	Béjaïa
15:00	Zerdab 15'; Keddour 82'	Report		Stadium: Stade de l'Unité Maghrébine
Note: Lineup for JSM Béjaïa - Chouih - Meftah, Zafour, Maïza, Megatli - Boucherit, Hamlaoui, Kacem (Boukmacha 85’) - Gasmi (Boulaïnceur 88’), N’Djeng (Kaddour 75’), Zerdab.

25 March 2011 Round of 16	JSM Béjaïa	0–0 (a.e.t.) (5–6 p)	MC Alger	Béjaïa
15:00		Report		Stadium: Stade de l'Unité Maghrébine; Attendance: 0 (close doors)
Note: Lineup for JSM Béjaïa - Chouih - Megateli, Zafour, Maïza, Belakhdar - Hamlaoui (Kacem, 85'), Boucherit, Maroci, Zerdab - N'Djeng, Gasmi (Kaddour, 73').

== Squad information ==
=== Playing statistics ===
No.	Pos	Nat	Player	Total		Ligue 1		Algerian Cup	
No.	Pos	Nat	Player	Apps	Goals	Apps	Goals	Apps	Goals
Goalkeepers
16	GK	(Algeria) ALG	Yacine Djebarat	10	0	10	0	0	0
1	GK	(Algeria) ALG	Ahmed Walid Chouih	7	0	7	0	0	0
12	GK	(Algeria) ALG	Cédric Si Mohamed	13	0	13	0	0	0
Defenders
4	DF	(Algeria) ALG	Sofian Kheyari	8	0	8	0	0	0
28	DF	(Algeria) ALG	Amar Bellakhdar	19	0	19	0	0	0
15	DF	(Algeria) ALG	Zidane Mebarakou	13	0	13	0	0	0
23	DF	(Algeria) ALG	Adel Maïza	25	4	25	4	0	0
18	DF	(Algeria) ALG	Amine Megateli	28	3	28	3	0	0
30	DF	(Algeria) ALG	Mohamed Rabie Meftah	24	6	24	6	0	0
13	DF	(Algeria) ALG	Brahim Zafour	21	0	21	0	0	0
27	DF	(Algeria) ALG	Nassim Boukemacha	21	0	21	0	0	0
Midfielders
21	MF	(Algeria) ALG	Mehdi Bouderadji	0	0	0	0	0	0
6	MF	(Algeria) ALG	Nassim Hamlaoui	19	0	19	0	0	0
14	MF	(Algeria) ALG	Mehdi Kacem	22	1	22	1	0	0
10	MF	(Algeria) ALG	Mehdi Boudar	18	0	18	0	0	0
32	MF	(Algeria) ALG	Zahir Zerdab	25	6	25	6	0	0
9	MF	(Algeria) ALG	Antar Boucherit	13	0	13	0	0	0
7	MF	(Algeria) ALG	Ahmed Ait Ouarab	0	0	0	0	0	0
	MF	(Algeria) ALG	Karim Kaddour	1	0	1	0	0	0
11	MF	(Algeria) ALG	Tayeb Maroci	22	1	22	1	0	0
Forwards
23	FW	(Algeria) ALG	Mohamed Lamine Aourès	5	0	5	0	0	0
22	FW	(Algeria) ALG	Tahar Bouraba	16	0	16	0	0	0
17	FW	(Algeria) ALG	Rafik Boulaïnceur	17	1	17	1	0	0
25	FW	(Cameroon) CMR	Yannick N'Djeng	29	14	29	14	0	0
20	FW	(Algeria) ALG	Abdelhakim Laref	2	0	2	0	0	0
8	FW	(Algeria) ALG	Ahmed Gasmi	28	8	28	8	0	0
Players transferred out during the season

Last updated: 24 November 2017
Source: fr.soccerway.com

== Transfers ==
=== In ===
Date	Pos	Player	From club	Transfer fee	Source
20 June 2010	DF	(Algeria) Mohamed Rabie Meftah	JS Kabylie	Free transfer	
20 June 2010	DF	(Algeria) Sofian Kheyari	(France) SO Cassis Carnoux	Free transfer	
24 June 2010	MF	(Algeria) Tayeb Maroci	JS Kabylie	Free transfer	
27 June 2010	DF	(Algeria) Adel Maïza	USM Annaba	Free transfer	
27 June 2010	FW	(Algeria) Ahmed Gasmi	USM Annaba	Free transfer	

=== Out ===
Date	Pos	Player	To club	Transfer fee	Source
21 June 2010	DF	(Algeria) Adel Messali	MC El Eulma	Free transfer	
1 July 2010	DF	(Algeria) Rachid Mehia	MC El Eulma	Free transfer	
1 July 2010	MF	(Algeria) Mesbah Deghiche	MC El Eulma	Free transfer	
1 July 2010	FW	(Algeria) Hamza Boulemdaïs	MC El Eulma	Free transfer	
1 July 2010	FW	(Algeria) Kouider Boukessassa	MC Oran	Free transfer	
