= 2010–11 MC Alger season =

MC Alger
2010–11 season
- Chairman: Omar Ghrib
- Head coach: Alain Michel (until 10 March 2011); Noureddine Zekri (from 15 March 2011)
- Stadium: Omar Hamadi Stadium
- Ligue 1: 10th
- Algerian Cup: Quarter-finals
- Champions League: Second round
- Top goalscorer: League: Abdelmalek Mokdad (9 goals); All: Abdelmalek Mokdad (12 goal)
Home colours

In the 2010–11 season, MC Alger competed in the Ligue 1 for the 40th season, as well as the Champions League, and the Algerian Cup. It was their 8th consecutive season in the top flight of Algerian football.

== Squad list ==
Players and squad numbers last updated on 18 November 2010.
Note: Flags indicate national team as has been defined under FIFA eligibility rules. Players may hold more than one non-FIFA nationality.

No.	Nat.	Position	Name	Date of Birth (Age)	Signed from
Goalkeepers
Defenders
Midfielders
Forwards

== Competitions ==
=== Overview ===
Competition	Record								Started round	Final position / round	First match	Last match
Competition	G	W	D	L	GF	GA	GD	Win %	Started round	Final position / round	First match	Last match
Ligue 1	30	8	13	9	30	28	+2	26.67	—N/a	10th	25 September 2010	8 July 2011
Algerian Cup	4	1	3	0	2	1	+1	25.00	Round of 64	Quarter-final	28 December 2010	8 April 2011
Champions League	6	3	2	1	11	8	+3	50.00	Preliminary round	Second round	30 January 2011	7 May 2011
Total	40	12	18	10	43	37	+6	30.00				

Updated to match played 9 May 2017
Source: Competitions

== League table ==
Pos	Team	Pld	W	D	L	GF	GA	GD	Pts
8	AS Khroub	30	10	9	11	30	36	−6	39
9	USM Alger	30	9	11	10	32	28	+4	38
10	MC Alger	30	8	13	9	30	28	+2	37
11	JS Kabylie	30	10	7	13	26	37	−11	37
12	WA Tlemcen	30	10	7	13	35	36	−1	37

Updated to match(es) played on 19 April 2018. Source: DZFoot
Rules for classification: 1) points; 2) head-to-head points; 3) head-to-head goal difference; 4) goal difference; 5) total goals; 6) fairplay ranking; 7) playoff.

=== Results summary ===
Overall								Home						Away					
Pld	W	D	L	GF	GA	GD	Pts	W	D	L	GF	GA	GD	W	D	L	GF	GA	GD
30	8	13	9	30	28	+2	37	5	8	2	15	9	+6	3	5	7	15	19	−4

Last updated: 29 December 2014.
Source: Competitive matches

=== Results by round ===
Round	1	2	3	4	5	6	7	8	9	10	11	12	13	14	15	16	17	18	19	20	21	22	23	24	25	26	27	28	29	30
Ground	A	A	H	A	H	A	H	A	H	A	H	A	H	A	H	H	H	A	H	A	H	A	H	A	H	A	H	A	H	A
Result	L	W	L	L	W	L	D	D	D	W	D	L	D	L	D	W	D	D	D	D	L	W	D	L	W	D	W	W	W	D
Position																														

Source: Competitive matches
A = Away; H = Home; W = Win; D = Draw; L = Loss

=== Matches ===
Win Draw Loss

25 September 2010 Round 1	MC El Eulma	1–0	MC Alger	El Eulma
17:00	Karaoui 7'	Soccerway report		Stadium: Stade Messaoud Zougar; Referee: Kadda Babrahim

2 October 2010 Round 2	AS Khroub	2–3	MC Alger	El Khroub
17:00	Bounab 25'; Leghzal 38'	Soccerway report	Amroune 1'; Mokdad 72' (pen.); Derrag 81'	Stadium: Stade Abed Hamdani; Referee: Boubekeur Zouaoui

10 October 2010 Round 3	MC Alger	0–1	MC Oran	Algiers
17:00		Soccerway report	Berradja 81' (pen.)	Stadium: Stade 5 Juillet 1962; Referee: Mehdi Abid Charef

23 October 2010 Round 4	CR Belouizdad	2–1	MC Alger	Belouizdad
16:00	Bourakba 16', 60'	Soccerway report	Younès 52'	Stadium: Stade 20 Août 1955; Referee: Sofiane Bousseter

26 October 2010 Round 5	MC Alger	3–1	CA Bordj Bou Arreridj	Algiers
20:00	Bakha 20' (o.g.); Mokdad 45'; Boudebouda 69'	Soccerway report	Bensaïd 70'	Stadium: Stade 5 Juillet 1962; Referee: Farouk Mial

29 October 2010 Round 6	ASO Chlef	1–0	MC Alger	Chlef
19:00	Messaoud 79'	Soccerway report		Stadium: Stade Mohamed Boumezrag; Referee: Farouk Houasnia

30 November 2010 Round 7	MC Alger	0–0	USM Alger	Algiers
18:00		Soccerway report		Stadium: Stade 5 Juillet 1962; Referee: Mohamed Bichari

31 December 2010 Round 8	ES Sétif	2–2	MC Alger	Sétif
18:00	Daoud 67' (o.g.); Laïfaoui 90'	Soccerway report	Mokdad 64'; Babouche 77'	Stadium: Stade 8 Mai 1945; Referee: Djamel Haimoudi

26 November 2010 Round 9	MC Alger	2–2	USM Annaba	Algiers
19:30	Belkheïr 44'; Boudebouda 80'	Soccerway report	Bouaïcha 25'; Boukhlouf 59'	Stadium: Stade 5 Juillet 1962; Referee: Farouk Mial

3 December 2010 Round 10	WA Tlemcen	1–2	MC Alger	Tlemcen
15:00	Lazaref 90+3'	Soccerway report	Mokdad 20'; Amroune 54' (pen.)	Stadium: Stade Akid Lotfi; Referee: Farid Bahloul

4 January 2011 Round 11	MC Alger	0–0	JSM Béjaïa	Belouizdad
18:00		Soccerway report		Stadium: Stade 20 Août 1955; Referee: Mehdi Abid Charef

15 February 2011 Round 12	USM El Harrach	1–0	MC Alger	Algiers
14:30	Boumechra 70'	Soccerway report		Stadium: Stade 1er Novembre 1954; Referee: Mokhtar Amalou

22 February 2011 Round 13	MC Alger	0–0	MC Saïda	Rouiba
14:30		Soccerway report		Stadium: Stade Mabrouki Salem; Referee: Boubekeur Zouaoui

8 March 2010 Round 14	USM Blida	1–0	MC Alger	Blida
14:30	Djemaouni 61'	Soccerway report		Stadium: Stade Mustapha Tchaker; Referee: Rafik Achouri

26 February 2011 Round 15	MC Alger	1–1	JS Kabylie	Rouïba
14:30	Boudebouda 1'	Soccerway report	Hamiti 77'	Stadium: Stade Mabrouki Salem; Referee: Sofiane Bousseter

26 February 2011 Round 16	MC Alger	3–1	MC El Eulma	Rouïba
14:30	Mokdad 12' (pen.), 77'; Daoudi 24'	Soccerway report	Tiaïba 15'	Stadium: Stade Mabrouki Salem; Referee: Mohamed Bouhenni

29 March 2011 Round 17	MC Alger	0–0	AS Khroub	Algiers
15:30		Soccerway report		Stadium: Stade 5 Juillet 1962; Referee: Mohamed Sahraoui

30 April 2011 Round 18	MC Oran	1–1	MC Alger	Oran
17:00	Chérif 76'	Soccerway report	Laref 20'	Stadium: Ahmed Zabana Stadium; Referee: Farid Bahloul

13 April 2011 Round 19	MC Alger	1–1	CR Belouizdad	Algiers
17:00	Mokdad 21'	Soccerway report	Saïbi 14'	Stadium: Stade Omar Hammadi; Referee: Mohamed Bichari

10 May 2011 Round 20	CA Bordj Bou Arreridj	1–1	MC Alger	Bordj Bou Arréridj
19:00	Bentayeb 83'	Soccerway report	Mokdad 7' (pen.)	Stadium: Stade 20 Août 1955; Referee: Mohamed Benouza

6 June 2011 Round 21	MC Alger	0–1	ASO Chlef	Bologhine
19:00		Soccerway report	Ali Hadji 88'	Stadium: Omar Hamadi Stadium; Referee: Mokhtar Amalou

14 May 2011 Round 22	USM Alger	1–2	MC Alger	Bologhine
16:00	Meklouche 59'	Soccerway report	6' Zeddam; 57' Sofiane	Stadium: Omar Hammadi Stadium; Attendance: 0 (close doors); Referee: Mokhtar Amalou

21 May 2011 Round 23	MC Alger	1–1	ES Sétif	Bologhine
17:00	Derrag 32'	Soccerway report	Hachoud 39'	Stadium: Omar Hammadi Stadium; Referee: Farouk Houasnia

28 May 2011 Round 24	USM Annaba	2–1	MC Alger	Annaba
17:00	Boukhlouf 53'; Ali Guechi 84'	Soccerway report	Bouchema 8' (pen.)	Stadium: Stade 19 Mai 1956; Referee: Boubekeur Zouaoui

18 June 2011 Round 25	MC Alger	1–0	WA Tlemcen	Bologhine
20:00	Bensalem 59'	Soccerway report		Stadium: Omar Hammadi Stadium; Referee: Mehdi Abid Charef

11 June 2011 Round 26	JSM Béjaïa	1–1	MC Alger	Béjaïa
20:00	Maïza 30'	Soccerway report	Bouchema 89'	Stadium: Stade de l'Unité Maghrébine; Referee: Mohamed Benouza

25 June 2011 Round 27	MC Alger	2–0	USM El Harrach	Bologhine
18:00	Besseghir 10'; Mokdad 70'	Soccerway report		Stadium: Omar Hammadi Stadium; Referee: Djamel Haimoudi

28 June 2011 Round 28	MC Saïda	2–1	MC Alger	Saida
18:00	Zaoui 45+2'; Akkouche 90'	Soccerway report	Bouchema 56'	Stadium: April 13, 1958 Stadium; Referee: Mohamed Babou

1 July 2011 Round 29	MC Alger	1–0	USM Blida	Bologhine
18:00	Boudebouda 22' (pen.)	Soccerway report		Stadium: Omar Hammadi Stadium; Referee: Mohamed Benouza

8 July 2011 Round 30	JS Kabylie	0–0	MC Alger	Tizi Ouzou
18:00		Soccerway report		Stadium: Stade 1er Novembre 1954; Referee: Rafik Achouri

=== Algerian Cup ===
28 December 2010 Round of 64	MC Alger	2–1	IRB Tiaret
14:00	Sofiane 18'; Herkat 32' (pen.)	Report	Kabouche 63'
Note: Lineup for MC Alger - Bouhedda - Bouhafer, Megherbi, Harkat, Bensalem - Mokdad, Daoud, Attafen, Ammour, Douadi (Belkheir 58’) - Sofiane.

5 March 2011 Round of 32	MC Mekhadma	0–0 (a.e.t.) (2–4 p)	MC Alger
15:00		Report
Note: Lineup for MC Alger - Zemmamouche - Besseghir, Megherbi, Zeddam, Bedbouda - Attafen, Berramla, Daoud (Harkat 107’), Babouche, Douadi (Amroune 56’) - Laref (Hamrat 88’).

25 March 2011 Round of 16	JSM Béjaïa	0–0 (a.e.t.) (5–6 p)	MC Alger	Béjaïa
15:00		Report		Stadium: Stade de l'Unité Maghrébine; Attendance: 0 (close doors)
Note: Lineup for MC Alger - Zemmamouche - Besseghir, Megherbi, Bedbouda, Babouche - Koudri, Bouchema, Berramla (Douadi, 62') - Mokdad, Sofiane (Harkat, 117'), Laref (Hamrat, 67').

8 April 2011 Quarter-finals	MC Alger	0–0 (a.e.t.) (4–5 p)	MC Oran	Rouïba
17:00		Report		Stadium: Stade Mabrouki Salem; Referee: Farouk Mial
Note: Lineup for MC Alger - Zemmamouche - Besseghir, Megherbi, Zeddam, Babouche – Koudri (Harkat 119’), Bouchema, Berramla (Attafen 46’) - Mokdad, Sofiane, Hamrat (Amroune 64’).

=== Champions League ===
==== Preliminary round ====
30 January 2011	Olympic Real de Bangui (Central African Republic)	1–1	(Algeria) MC Alger	Bangui
16:00 UTC+1	Kelebona 90+2'	Report	Mokdad 28'	Stadium: Barthelemy Boganda Stadium; Referee: Mbolo, Yinga, Oungoun
Note: Lineup for MC Alger - Zemmamouche, Besseghier, Babouche (Bensalem 33’), Herkat (Megherbi 73), Zeddam, Bouchama, Koudri, Daoud, Mokdad, Daoudi (Derrag 61), Youcef Sofiane

11 February 2011	MC Alger (Algeria)	2–0	(Central African Republic) Olympic Real de Bangui	Rouïba
16:00 UTC+1	Bouchema 23'; Derrag 51'	Report		Stadium: Stade Mabrouki Salem
Note: Lineup for MC Alger - Bouhedda - Besseghir, Harkat (Daoud 86’), Zeddam, Babouche - Koudri, Bouchama, Attafen - Douadi, Sofiane, Derrag (Megherbi 67’).

==== First round ====
20 March 2011	Dynamos (Zimbabwe)	4–1	(Algeria) MC Alger	Harare
15:00 UTC+2	Zhokinyi 17'; Mutuma 45+2'; Mukamba 76'; Vimisai 83'	Report	Babouche 88'	Stadium: Rufaro Stadium
Note: Lineup for MC Alger - Zemmamouche - Besseghier, Zeddam, Harkat, Babouche - Mokdad, Bouchama, Koudri, Attafen (Bedbouda 60’) - Sofiane, Amroune.

3 April 2011	MC Alger (Algeria)	3–0	(Zimbabwe) Dynamos	Algiers
19:00 UTC+1	Bedbouda 41', 90'; Mokdad 76' (pen.)	Report		Stadium: Omar Hammadi Stadium
Note: Lineup for MC Alger - Zemmamouche - Besseghier, Zeddam, Megherbi, Bedbouda - Daoud, Koudri, Babouche (Attafen 21’) - Mokdad, Sofiane (Amroune 71’), Douadi (Bensalem 78’).

==== Second round ====
23 April 2011	Interclube (Angola)	1–1	(Algeria) MC Alger	Luanda
16:00 UTC+1	Henriques 9'	Report	Bensalem 90+3'	Stadium: Estádio Joaquim Dinis
Note: Lineup for MC Alger - Zemmamouche - Besseghir (Sofiane 46'), Harkat, Zeddam, Babouche - Mokdad (Bensalem 90'), Daoud, Bouchama, Koudri, Daouadi - Amroune (Derrag 46').

7 May 2011	MC Alger (Algeria)	3–2	(Angola) Interclube	Algiers
19:00 UTC+1	Sofiane 5'; Mokdad 45+2'; Bedbouda 89' (pen.)	Report	Henriques 43', 67'	Stadium: Omar Hammadi Stadium
Note: Lineup for MC Alger - Zemmamouche - Bouchama, Zedam, Megherbi (Besseghir 46’), Bedbouda - Mokdad, Daoud, Koudri, Babouche (Amroune 84’), Attafen - Sofiane (Bensalem 79’).

== Squad information ==
=== Playing statistics ===
No.	Pos	Nat	Player	Total		Ligue 1		Algerian Cup		Champions League	
No.	Pos	Nat	Player	Apps	Goals	Apps	Goals	Apps	Goals	Apps	Goals
30	GK	(Algeria) ALG	Billal Slimani	3	0	3	0	0	0	0	0
1	GK	(Algeria) ALG	Mohamed Lamine Zemmamouche	32	0	24	0	3	0	5	0
	GK	(Algeria) ALG	Sofiane Azzedine	2	0	2	0	0	0	0	0
	GK	(Algeria) ALG	Farid Bouzidi	1	0	1	0	0	0	0	0
28	GK	(Algeria) ALG	Seddik Bouhadda	2	0	0	0	1	0	1	0
	DF	(Algeria) ALG	Icham Mouissi	2	0	2	0	0	0	0	0
11	DF	(Algeria) ALG	Abdelkader Besseghir	36	1	27	1	3	0	6	0
15	DF	(Algeria) ALG	Réda Babouche	28	2	19	1	3	0	6	1
25	DF	(Algeria) ALG	Hamza Zeddam	31	1	23	1	2	0	6	0
4	DF	(Algeria) ALG	Sofiane Harkat	18	1	10	0	4	1	4	0
	DF	(Algeria) ALG	Mohamed Aberrane	2	0	2	0	0	0	0	0
6	DF	(Algeria) ALG	Brahim Boudebouda	29	7	24	4	2	0	3	3
12	DF	(Algeria) ALG	Mohamed Megherbi	26	0	18	0	4	0	4	0
	DF	(Algeria) ALG	Oussama Akrour	2	0	2	0	0	0	0	0
17	DF	(Algeria) ALG	Toufik Bouhafer	1	0	0	0	1	0	0	0
8	MF	(Algeria) ALG	Abdelmalek Mokdad	34	12	26	9	3	0	5	3
23	MF	(Algeria) ALG	Hamza Koudri	34	0	26	0	2	0	6	0
18	MF	(Algeria) ALG	Farid Daoud	24	0	17	0	2	0	5	0
13	MF	(Algeria) ALG	Nassim Bouchema	29	4	22	3	2	0	5	1
7	MF	(Algeria) ALG	Billel Attafen	29	0	22	0	3	0	4	0
	MF	(Algeria) ALG	Tayeb Berramla	17	0	14	0	3	0	0	0
19	MF	(Algeria) ALG	El Almi Daoudi	33	1	26	1	3	0	4	0
	MF	(Algeria) ALG	Abdelhakim Laref	9	1	7	1	2	0	0	0
	MF	(Algeria) ALG	Sofiane Abd El Rahim Ben Omar	1	0	1	0	0	0	0	0
	MF	(Algeria) ALG	Mohamed Issam Hamrat	3	0	0	0	3	0	0	0
5	FW	(Algeria) ALG	Mohamed Derrag	15	3	12	2	0	0	3	1
10	FW	(Algeria) ALG	Mohamed Amine Belkheïr	10	1	9	1	1	0	0	0
29	FW	(Algeria) ALG	Mohamed Amroune	29	2	23	2	2	0	4	0
14	FW	(France) FRA	Youssef Sofiane	23	4	14	2	3	1	6	1
	FW	(Algeria) ALG	Mohamed Issam Hamrat	4	0	4	0	0	0	0	0
31	FW	(Algeria) ALG	Zineddine Bensalem	24	2	19	1	1	0	4	1
	FW	(Algeria) ALG	Abdelhadi Nabet	3	0	3	0	0	0	0	0
	FW	(Algeria) ALG	Mohamed Yader	1	0	1	0	0	0	0	0
Players transferred out during the season
21	MF	(Algeria) ALG	Amar Ammour	9	0	8	0	1	0	0	0

Last updated: 27 November 2017
Source: fr.soccerway.com

== Transfers ==
=== In ===
Date	Pos	Player	From club	Transfer fee	Source
12 July 2010	MF	(Algeria) Amar Ammour	CR Belouizdad	Free transfer	

=== Out ===
Date	Pos	Player	To club	Transfer fee	Source
15 July 2010	FW	(Algeria) Hadj Bouguèche	(United Arab Emirates) Emirates Club	Free transfer	
29 January 2011	MF	(Algeria) Amar Ammour	CR Belouizdad	Free transfer	
