= 2013–14 CRB Aïn Fakroun season =

Football season

CRB Aïn Fakroun
2013–14 season
- Head coach: Nabil Neghiz (until 15 July 2013); Lamine Boughrara (from 16 July 2013) (until 5 September 2013); Said Hammouche (from 10 September 2013) (until 24 November 2013); Abdelaziz Abbès (from 27 November 2013) (until 30 June 2014)
- Stadium: Stade des Frères Demane Debbih, Aïn M'lila
- Ligue 1: 16th
- Algerian Cup: Semi-final
- Top goalscorer: League: Ali Daira (3); Mohamed Amroune (3); Ahmed Kara (3); All: Ahmed Kara (5); Mohamed Amroune (5)

In the 2013–14 season, CRB Aïn Fakroun is competing in the Ligue 1 for the 1st season, as well as the Algerian Cup. They will be competing in Ligue 1, and the Algerian Cup.

== Competitions ==
=== Overview ===
Competition	Record								Started round	Final position / round	First match	Last match
Competition	G	W	D	L	GF	GA	GD	Win %	Started round	Final position / round	First match	Last match
Ligue 1	30	5	5	20	16	39	−23	16.67	—N/a	16th	24 August 2013	22 May 2014
Algerian Cup	5	2	2	1	8	5	+3	40.00	Round of 64	Semi-final	7 December 2013	28 March 2014
Total	35	7	7	21	24	44	−20	20.00				

Updated to match played 9 May 2017
Source: Competitions

== League table ==
Pos	Team	Pld	W	D	L	GF	GA	GD	Pts	Qualification or relegation
12	MC Oran	30	9	8	13	33	40	−7	35	
13	CR Belouizdad	30	9	5	16	26	33	−7	32	
14	JSM Béjaïa (R)	30	7	7	16	24	44	−20	28	Relegation to Ligue Professionnelle 2
15	CA Bordj Bou Arréridj (R)	30	4	9	17	23	47	−24	21	Relegation to Ligue Professionnelle 2
16	CRB Aïn Fakroun (R)	30	5	5	20	16	39	−23	20	Relegation to Ligue Professionnelle 2

Updated to match(es) played on 22 May 2014. Source: DZFoot
Rules for classification: 1) points; 2) head-to-head points; 3) head-to-head goal difference; 4) goal difference; 5) total goals; 6) fairplay ranking; 7) playoff.
(R) Relegated

=== Results summary ===
Overall								Home						Away					
Pld	W	D	L	GF	GA	GD	Pts	W	D	L	GF	GA	GD	W	D	L	GF	GA	GD
30	5	5	20	16	39	−23	20	5	1	9	8	18	−10	0	4	11	8	21	−13

Last updated: 29 December 2014.
Source: Competitive matches

=== Results by round ===
Round	1	2	3	4	5	6	7	8	9	10	11	12	13	14	15	16	17	18	19	20	21	22	23	24	25	26	27	28	29	30
Ground	H	A	H	A	H	A	H	A	H	A	A	H	A	H	A	A	H	A	H	A	H	A	H	A	H	H	A	H	A	H
Result	L	L	L	D	D	L	L	L	W	L	D	L	D	W	D	L	W	L	W	L	W	L	L	L	L	L	L	L	L	L
Position																														16

Updated to match(es) played on 29 December 2014. Source: Competitive matches
A = Away; H = Home; W = Win; D = Draw; L = Loss

=== Matches ===
24 August 2013 Round 1	CRB Aïn Fakroun	0–1	ES Sétif	Aïn M'lila
17:00		Report	55' Gourmi	Stadium: Stade des Frères Demane Debbih; Referee: Farouk Houasnia

31 August 2013 Round 2	MC Alger	3–2	CRB Aïn Fakroun	Algiers
18:00	Yachir 32', 55'; Hachoud 34'	Report	40' Kara; 60' Amroune	Stadium: Stade 5 Juillet 1962; Referee: Mohamed Saïdi

3 September 2013 Round 3	CRB Aïn Fakroun	0–1	JS Kabylie	Aïn M'lila
17:00		Report	45' Ebossé Bodjongo	Stadium: Stade des Frères Demane Debbih; Referee: Redouane Necib

14 September 2013 Round 4	CA Bordj Bou Arreridj	0–0	CRB Aïn Fakroun	Bordj Bou Arréridj
18:00		Report		Stadium: Stade 20 Août 1955; Referee: Rafik Achouri

21 September 2013 Round 5	CRB Aïn Fakroun	0–0	JS Saoura	Aïn M'lila
16:00		Report		Stadium: Stade des Frères Demane Debbih; Referee: Mehdi Abid Charef

27 September 2013 Round 6	MO Béjaïa	1–0	CRB Aïn Fakroun	Béjaïa
16:45	Semani 73'	Report		Stadium: Stade de l'Unité Maghrébine; Referee: Farouk Houasnia

5 October 2013 Round 7	CRB Aïn Fakroun	0–3	USM El Harrach	Aïn M'lila
16:00		Report		Stadium: Stade des Frères Demane Debbih; Referee: Said Aouina

19 October 2013 Round 8	CS Constantine	2–1	CRB Aïn Fakroun	Constantine
18:00	Sameur 84' (pen.), 89'	Report	90+3' Kara	Stadium: Stade Mohamed Hamlaoui; Referee: Abderrezzak Arab

26 October 2013 Round 9	CRB Aïn Fakroun	1–0	MC El Eulma	Aïn M'lila
15:00	Daïra 45+2' (pen.)	Report		Stadium: Stade des Frères Demane Debbih; Referee: Amine Sekhraoui

2 November 2013 Round 10	USM Alger	1–0	CRB Aïn Fakroun	Algiers
18:00	Andria 26'	Report		Stadium: Stade Omar Hamadi; Referee: Youssef Zerrouki

9 November 2013 Round 11	JSM Béjaïa	1–1	CRB Aïn Fakroun	Béjaïa
18:00	Bangoura 74' (pen.)	Report	66' H. Sahbi	Stadium: Stade de l'Unité Maghrébine; Referee: Mokhtar Amalou

23 November 2013 Round 12	CRB Aïn Fakroun	0–1	MC Oran	Aïn M'lila
15:00		Report	23' Bouaïcha	Stadium: Stade des Frères Demane Debbih; Attendance: 0 (close doors); Referee: Sofiane Bousseter

30 November 2013 Round 13	CR Belouizdad	0–0	CRB Aïn Fakroun	Algiers
16:00		Report		Stadium: Stade 20 Août 1955; Referee: Mohamed Sahraoui

13 December 2013 Round 14	CRB Aïn Fakroun	1–0	RC Arbaâ	Aïn M'lila
15:00	Ziad 61'	Report		Stadium: Stade des Frères Demane Debbih; Referee: Mohamed Benouza

28 December 2013 Round 15	ASO Chlef	0–0	CRB Aïn Fakroun	Chlef
18:00		Report		Stadium: Stade Mohamed Boumezrag; Referee: Mohamed Bachir

18 January 2014 Round 16	ES Sétif	1–0	CRB Aïn Fakroun	Sétif
18:00	Tiaïba 80'	Report		Stadium: Stade 8 Mai 1945; Referee: Sofiane Bousseter

1 February 2014 Round 17	CRB Aïn Fakroun	1–0	MC Alger	Aïn M'lila
15:00	Amroune 73'	Report		Stadium: Stade des Frères Demane Debbih; Referee: Mohamed Bachir

8 February 2014 Round 18	JS Kabylie	1–0	CRB Aïn Fakroun	Tizi Ouzou
15:00	Rial 90+2' (pen.)	Report		Stadium: Stade du 1er Novembre 1954; Referee: Said Aouina

14 February 2014 Round 19	CRB Aïn Fakroun	2–0	CA Bordj Bou Arreridj	Aïn M'lila
15:00	Maanser 75'; Belaâlem 90+2'	Report		Stadium: Stade des Frères Demane Debbih; Referee: Farouk Houasnia

22 February 2014 Round 20	JS Saoura	2–1	CRB Aïn Fakroun	Béchar
15:00	Hamzaoui 55'; Bagayoko 57'	Report	84' Daoudi	Stadium: Stade 20 Août 1955; Referee: Youssef Zerrouki

1 March 2014 Round 21	CRB Aïn Fakroun	2–1	MO Béjaïa	Aïn M'lila
15:00	Daïra 54'; Daoudi 80'	Report	62' Betrouni	Stadium: Stade des Frères Demane Debbih; Referee: Mohamed Bachir

8 March 2014 Round 22	USM El Harrach	1–0	CRB Aïn Fakroun	Algiers
15:00	Boumechra 90+1'	Report		Stadium: Stade 1er Novembre 1954; Referee: Mohamed Sahraoui

15 March 2014 Round 23	CRB Aïn Fakroun	0–2	CS Constantine	Aïn M'lila
15:00		Report	4' Hadiouche; 55' Boulemdaïs	Stadium: Stade des Frères Demane Debbih; Referee: Merzak Halalchi

22 March 2014 Round 24	MC El Eulma	3–1	CRB Aïn Fakroun	El Eulma
16:00	Derrardja 18'; Zeghidi 21'; Kadri 35'	Report	66' Amroune	Stadium: Stade Messaoud Zougar; Referee: Djamel Haimoudi

26 April 2014 Round 25	CRB Aïn Fakroun	0–2	USM Alger	Aïn M'lila
15:00		Report	58' Boudebouda; 90' Gasmi	Stadium: Stade des Frères Demane Debbih; Attendance: 0 (close doors); Referee: Mohamed Boukhalfa

3 May 2014 Round 26	CRB Aïn Fakroun	0–1	JSM Béjaïa	Aïn M'lila
16:00		Report	90+1' I. Tatem	Stadium: Stade des Frères Demane Debbih; Attendance: 0 (close doors); Referee: Boubekeur Zouaoui

10 May 2014 Round 27	MC Oran	3–1	CRB Aïn Fakroun	Oran
17:00	Bouaïcha 42'; Berradja 50'; Benyettou 87'	Report	44' (pen.) Daira	Stadium: Ahmed Zabana Stadium; Referee: Mokhtar Amalou

13 May 2014 Round 28	CRB Aïn Fakroun	0–2	CR Belouizdad	Aïn M'lila
17:00		Report	2' Rebih; 28' Bourakba	Stadium: Stade des Frères Demane Debbih; Referee: Mohamed Saïdi

17 May 2014 Round 29	RC Arbaâ	2–1	CRB Aïn Fakroun	Larbaâ
17:00	Amiri 80'; Bougueroua 90'	Report	49' Sahbi	Stadium: Stade Ismaïl Makhlouf; Referee: Lyés Bekouassa

24 May 2014 Round 30	CRB Aïn Fakroun	1–4	ASO Chlef	Aïn M'lila
17:00	Daïra 48'	Report	30', 58' Merzougui; 32' Tedjar; 39' Ali Hadji	Stadium: Stade des Frères Demane Debbih; Referee: Abdelkrim Bouchama

== Algerian Cup ==
7 December 2013 Round of 64	CRB Aïn Fakroun	3–0	JSM Skikda	Aïn M'lila
14:30	Amroune 20' (pen.), 65'; Mainceur 86'	Repport		Stadium: Stade des Frères Demane Debbih

20 December 2013 Round of 32	CRB Aïn Fakroun	0–0 (4–3 p)	RC Arbaâ	Aïn M'lila
14:30		Repport		Stadium: Stade des Frères Demane Debbih; Referee: Saïdi, Bechirene, Rezguane

25 January 2014 Round of 16	A Bou Saada	2–2 (3–4 p)	CRB Aïn Fakroun	Bou Saâda
15:00	Nouara 43'; Boukhari 100'	Repport	65' Daouadi; 107' Belalem	Stadium: Stade Abdelmadjid Mokhtari; Referee: Achouri, Amari, Bougherara

18 February 2014 Quarter-final	CRB Aïn Fakroun	2–1	MO Constantine	Aïn M'lila
14:30	Kara 49', 75'	Repport	20' Si Amar	Stadium: Stade des Frères Demane Debbih; Referee: Bichari, Bourouba, Gourari

28 March 2014 Semi-final	JS Kabylie	2–1 (a.e.t.)	CRB Aïn Fakroun	Tizi Ouzou
16:00	Ali Rial 97'; Albert Ebossé Bodjongo 117'	Report	106' Daïra	Stadium: Stade 1er Novembre 1954; Attendance: 15.000; Referee: Abid Charef, Bitam, Tamen

== Squad information ==
=== Playing statistics ===
No.	Pos	Nat	Player	Total		Ligue 1		Algerian Cup	
No.	Pos	Nat	Player	Apps	Goals	Apps	Goals	Apps	Goals
Goalkeepers
33	GK	(Algeria) ALG	Abderrahmane Boultif	9	0	7	0	2	0
12	GK	(Algeria) ALG	Khairi Barki	25	0	23	0	2	0
30	GK	(Algeria) ALG	Rédouane Bachagha	1	0	1	0	0	0
Defenders
2	DF	(Algeria) ALG	Mounir Amrane	1	0	1	0	0	0
25	DF	(Algeria) ALG	Rabah Ziad	25	1	21	1	4	0
18	DF	(Algeria) ALG	Toufik Bouhafer	6	0	6	0	0	0
9	DF	(Algeria) ALG	Adlen Griche	20	0	18	0	2	0
17	DF	(Algeria) ALG	Amir Belaili	30	0	26	0	4	0
31	DF	(Algeria) ALG	Abdelkrim Taibi	12	0	12	0	0	0
4	DF	(Algeria) ALG	Mohamed Oukrif	31	1	28	1	3	0
7	DF	(Algeria) ALG	Toufik Saibi	26	0	24	0	2	0
	DF	(Algeria) ALG	Benkrada	2	0	1	0	1	0
	DF	(Algeria) ALG	Mohamed Arroudj	5	0	5	0	0	0
Midfielders
	MF	(Algeria) ALG	Abbas Aïssaoui	5	0	5	0	0	0
	MF	(Algeria) ALG	Billal Naïli	17	0	14	0	3	0
8	MF	(Algeria) ALG	Mohamed Saidi	26	0	22	0	4	0
85	MF	(Algeria) ALG	El Almi Daoudi	25	3	22	2	3	1
5	MF	(Algeria) ALG	Ali Daira	30	4	27	3	3	1
26	MF	(Algeria) ALG	Hichem Manseur	18	1	14	1	4	0
	MF	(Algeria) ALG	Ayoub Ferhat	10	0	7	0	3	0
77	MF	(Cameroon) CMR	Vincent Mbarga Manga	8	0	6	0	2	0
23	MF	(Algeria) ALG	Ramzi Mouas	5	0	5	0	0	0
	MF	(Algeria) ALG	Fawzi Benhamla	7	0	7	0	0	0
6	MF	(Algeria) ALG	Abdelouahid Chouaib	26	0	23	0	3	0
	MF	(Algeria) ALG	Karim Kebaili	1	0	1	0	0	0
Forwards
3	FW	(Algeria) ALG	Rachid Benharoun	2	0	2	0	0	0
20	FW	(Algeria) ALG	Mohamed Amroune	27	3	23	3	4	0
10	FW	(Algeria) ALG	Moustafa Bouregaa	6	0	6	0	0	0
11	FW	(Algeria) ALG	Ahmed Kara	27	5	24	3	3	2
29	FW	(Algeria) ALG	Hamza Sahbi	15	2	15	2	0	0
40	FW	(Algeria) ALG	Abdelmoumene Bellalem	15	2	12	1	3	1
	FW	(Algeria) ALG	Anouar Bezghiche	2	0	2	0	0	0
	FW	(Algeria) ALG	Mohamed Haloui	3	0	3	0	0	0
	FW	(Algeria) ALG	Moumen	1	0	0	0	1	0
Players transferred out during the season

Last updated: 14 November 2017
Source: fr.soccerway.com

== Transfers ==
=== In ===
==== Summer ====
Date	Pos	Player	From club	Transfer fee	Source
1 July 2013	GK	(Algeria) Khairi Barki	USM Annaba	Undisclosed	
1 July 2013	MF	(Algeria) Amir Belaili	MO Constantine	Undisclosed	
1 July 2013	MF	(Algeria) Ramzi Mouas	USM Annaba	Undisclosed	
1 July 2013	DF	(Algeria) Toufik Bouhafer	ASO Chlef	Free transfer	
9 July 2013	MF	(Algeria) Abbas Aïssaoui	USM Bel-Abbès	Free transfer	
10 July 2013	DF	(Algeria) Adlen Griche	CS Constantine	Free transfer	
10 July 2013	MF	(Algeria) El Almi Daoudi	AS Khroub	Free transfer	
15 July 2013	FW	(Algeria) Moustafa Bouregaa	MO Constantine	Undisclosed	
16 July 2013	MF	(Algeria) Ali Daira	CA Batna	Free transfer	
16 July 2013	MF	(Algeria) Mohamed Saidi	CA Batna	Free transfer	
16 July 2013	FW	(Algeria) Mohamed Amroune	NA Hussein Dey	Free transfer	
17 July 2013	DF	(Algeria) Rabah Ziad	USM Bel-Abbès	Undisclosed	
17 July 2013	FW	(Algeria) Rachid Benharoun	USM Bel-Abbès	Undisclosed	
5 January 2014	MF	(Algeria) Billal Naïli	CR Belouizdad	Free transfer	
11 January 2014	MF	(Cameroon) Vincent Mbarga Manga	(Cameroon) Union Douala	Undisclosed	
12 January 2014	MF	(Algeria) Ayoub Ferhat	CA Bordj Bou Arréridj	Undisclosed	
15 January 2014	DF	(Algeria) Youcef Bekradja	JS Saoura	Undisclosed	
