= Ahmed Aït Ouarab =

French footballer (born 1979)

Personal information
- Date of birth: 7 August 1979 (age 47)
- Place of birth: Bourgoin-Jallieu, France
- Height: 1.75 m (5 ft 9 in)
- Position: Midfielder

Team information
- Current team: Hauts Lyonnais (manager)

Youth career
- 1996–1999: OGC Nice

Senior career*
Years	Team	Apps	(Gls)
1999–2002	FC Martigues	86	(0)
2002–2003	Le Mans UC	15	(0)
2003–2004	ES Wasquehal	30	(2)
2004–2005	ASOA Valence	37	(4)
2005–2006	Clermont Foot	18	(0)
2006–2008	FC Sète	69	(9)
2008–2009	Olympiakos Nicosia	0	(0)
2009–2011	JSM Béjaïa	5	(0)
2011–2014	Bergerac Périgord	0	(0)

Managerial career
- 2023–2025: FC Vaulx-en-Vel
- 2025–: Hauts Lyonnais
- * Club domestic league appearances and goals as of 31 June 2015, 12:00 (UTC)

Ahmed Aït Ouarab (Kabyle: Aḥmed At Waɛrab; born 7 August 1979) is a French retired football player who last play as a midfielder and currently manager of Hauts Lyonnais.

In January 2011, he terminated his contract with JSM Béjaïa with mutual consent after making just 5 appearances in one and a half seasons with the club.

== Personal ==
Aït Ouarab is originally from the town of Toudja, Béjaïa, in the Petite Kabylie region of northern Algeria.
