= Samir Si Hadj Mohand =

Algerian footballer (born 1982)

Personal information
- Full name: Samir Si Hadj Mohand
- Date of birth: July 16, 1982 (age 44)
- Place of birth: Béjaïa, Algeria
- Position: Midfielder

Team information
- Current team: CA Bordj Bou Arréridj

Youth career
- JSM Béjaïa

Senior career*
Years	Team	Apps	(Gls)
2008–2009	MO Béjaïa	-	(-)
2009–2011	AS Khroub	42	(2)
2011–	CA Bordj Bou Arréridj	0	(0)
- * Club domestic league appearances and goals as of 00:00, 23 August 2011 (UTC)

Samir Si Hadj Mohand (born July 16, 1982) is an Algerian football player. He currently plays for CA Bordj Bou Arréridj in the Algerian Ligue Professionnelle 2.

== Club career ==
Si Hadj Mohand began his career in the junior ranks of his hometown club of JSM Béjaïa. During his time with the club, he won the Junior Algerian Cup, for the first time in the club's history.

In 2007, Si Hadj Mohand joined MO Béjaïa, where he played for the next two seasons.

In the summer of 2009, he joined AS Khroub. On August 8, 2009, he made his debut for the club as a starter in a league game against ES Sétif.
