= Cyrille Ndaney =

Cameroonian footballer

Personal information
- Date of birth: 19 January 1989 (age 37)
- Place of birth: Yaoundé, Cameroon
- Height: 1.85 m (6 ft 1 in)
- Position: Forward

Team information
- Current team: Canon Yaoundé

Senior career*
Years	Team	Apps	(Gls)
2008–2009	Sedan		
2009–2011	Sofapaka		
2012	ES Sétif	3	(1)
2012	USM Bel-Abbès	10	(0)
2013–2014	Al-Shamal		
2019	Haras El Hodoud	7	(0)
2019–	Canon Yaoundé		
- * Club domestic league appearances and goals as of 23:08, 3 March 2020 (UTC)

Cyrille Ndaney (born 19 January 1989) is a Cameroonian professional footballer who plays for Canon Yaoundé.

== Honours ==
ES Sétif

- Algerian Cup: 2011–12
- Algerian Ligue Professionnelle 1: 2011–12
