= Adlène Boutnaf =

Algerian footballer (born 1984)

Personal information
- Full name: Adlène Boutnaf
- Date of birth: 23 February 1984 (age 42)
- Place of birth: Hussein Dey, Algiers, Algeria
- Position: Defender

Team information
- Current team: Olympique de Médéa
- Number: 18

Youth career
- 1995–2003: CR Belouizdad

Senior career*
Years	Team	Apps	(Gls)
2003–2007	CR Belouizdad		(?)
2007	MC Saïda		(?)
2007–2008	CR Belouizdad		(?)
2008	NA Hussein Dey		(?)
2008–2009	USM Bel-Abbès		(?)
2009–2010	OM Ruisseau	?	(?)
2010–2011	AS Khroub	19	(3)
2011–	Olympique de Médéa	22	(0)
- RC Arebaa 2012
- Paradau 2013
- AS Khoub 2014
- JSD jijel 2015

International career
2005	Algeria U23	5	(0)
- * Club domestic league appearances and goals as of 15:21, 19 October 2011 (UTC)

Adlène Boutnaf (born 23 February 1984 in Hussein Dey, Algiers) is an Algerian professional footballer. He currently plays as a defender for the Algerian Ligue 2 club Olympique de Médéa.

== Statistics ==
Club performance			League		Cup		Continental		Total	
Season	Club	League	Apps	Goals	Apps	Goals	Apps	Goals	Apps	Goals
Algeria			League		Algerian Cup		League Cup		Total	
2010-11	AS Khroub	Ligue 1	19	3	1	0	-		20	3
2011-12	Olympique de Médéa	Ligue 2	22	0	3	0	-		25	0
Total	Algeria		-	-	-	-	-	-	-	-
Career total			-	-	-	-	-	-	-	-
