= Sofian Kheyari =

French footballer and coach (born 1984)

Personal information
- Date of birth: 27 January 1984 (age 42)
- Place of birth: Alfortville, France
- Height: 1.90 m (6 ft 3 in)
- Position: Defender

Team information
- Current team: Saudi Arabia (assistant coach)

Senior career*
Years	Team	Apps	(Gls)
2003–2004	Le Touquet		
2004–2005	Romorantin	20	(0)
2005–2006	La Chaux-de-Fonds	14	(0)
2006–2007	Sion U21	16	(1)
2007	Chiasso	12	(0)
2008–2010	Cannes	36	(0)
2010	Cassis Carnoux	12	(1)
2010–2011	JSM Béjaïa	8	(0)
2011–2012	Crétil	4	(0)
2012–2013	Al-Riffa		
2013–2015	Tubize	61	(8)
2015–2016	ASO Chlef	11	(0)
2016–2017	RWDM47	10+	(0+)
2017–2018	UT Pétange	17	(0)
2018–2019	Cannes	19	(2)
Total		240+	(12+)

Managerial career
- 2019–: Saudi Arabia (assistant coach)
- * Club domestic league appearances and goals

Sofian Kheyari (Arabic: خياري سفيان; born 27 January 1984) is an Algerian-French football coach and retired player who is an assistant coach for the Saudi Arabia national team. He got married in Cannes in 2018 with Audrey Renard and they had a son born in Riyadh-Saudi named Aman in 2021

== Career ==
Kheyari started his senior career with SO Romorantin. In 2010, he signed for JSM Béjaïa in the Algerian Ligue Professionnelle 1, where he made eight league appearances and scored zero goals. After that, he played for US Créteil-Lusitanos, Riffa SC, A.F.C. Tubize, ASO Chlef, RWDM47, Union Titus Pétange, and AS Cannes.
