= Valentin Kouamé =

Burkinabé footballer

Personal information
- Date of birth: 16 November 1990 (age 35)
- Place of birth: Ouagadougou, Burkina Faso
- Height: 1.80 m (5 ft 11 in)
- Position: Midfielder

Team information
- Current team: Jeunesse d'Esch
- Number: 24

Youth career
- Étoile Filante

Senior career*
Years	Team	Apps	(Gls)
- Étoile Filante
2011–2012	MC Saïda		
2012–2013	ES Sétif	2	(0)
2013–2016	Santos		
2016–2019	Royal Francs-Borains		
2019–	Jeunesse d'Esch	10	(0)
- * Club domestic league appearances and goals as of 21:53, 21 November 2019 (UTC)

Valentin Kouamé is a Burkinabé professional football player.

== Honours ==
- ES Sétif
  - Algerian Cup
    - Winner: 2011–12
  - Algerian Ligue Professionnelle 1
    - Winner: 2011–12
