= Rachid Ferrahi =

Algerian footballer (born 1985)

Personal information
- Full name: Rachid Ferrahi
- Date of birth: July 18, 1985 (age 41)
- Place of birth: Oran, Algeria
- Position: Midfielder

Team information
- Current team: MC El Eulma
- Number: 20

Senior career*
Years	Team	Apps	(Gls)
2005–2007	AS PTT Oran	-	(-)
2007–2009	USM Oran	-	(-)
2009–2011	ES Mostaganem	-	(-)
2011–2014	ES Sétif	59	(2)
2014–2016	JS Kabylie	49	(1)
2016–2018	MC Oran	45	(1)
2018–	MC El Eulma	0	(0)
- * Club domestic league appearances and goals as of 21:10, August 24, 2018 (UTC)

Rachid Ferrahi (born July 18, 1985) is an Algerian footballer. He currently plays as a midfielder for MC El Eulma in the Algerian Ligue Professionnelle 2.

== Club career ==
On June 6, 2016, Ferrahi signed a contract with MC Oran, joining them on a transfer from JS Kabylie.
