= Tarek Berguiga =

Algerian football goalkeeper (born 1985)

Personal information
- Full name: Tarek Berguiga
- Date of birth: September 11, 1985 (age 41)
- Place of birth: Touggourt, Algeria
- Position: Goalkeeper

Team information
- Current team: Olympique de Magrane
- Number: 16

Senior career*
Years	Team	Apps	(Gls)
2008–2009	USM El Harrach	-	(-)
2010–2011	MC Mekhadma	-	(-)
2011–2012	ES Sétif	4	(0)
2012–2013	Olympique de Médéa	-	(-)
2013–2015	NT Souf	-	(-)
2015–2016	NRB Touggourt	-	(-)
2016–2017	NT Souf	-	(-)
2017–2023	NRB Touggourt	-	(-)
2023–	Olympique de Magrane	-	(-)
- * Club domestic league appearances and goals as of 27 October 2023

Tarek Berguiga (Arabic: طارق برقيقة; born September 11, 1985) is an Algerian football goalkeeper who plays for Olympique de Magrane in the Algerian Ligue 2.

== Club career ==
Berguiga made his debut for ES Sétif on April 14, 2012, as a starter in a league match against MC Oran.

== Honours ==
- Won the Algerian Cup once with ES Sétif in 2012
