= Toudja =

Commune in Algeria

Coordinates: 36°45′N 4°54′E

Toudja Tuǧa (Kabyle)
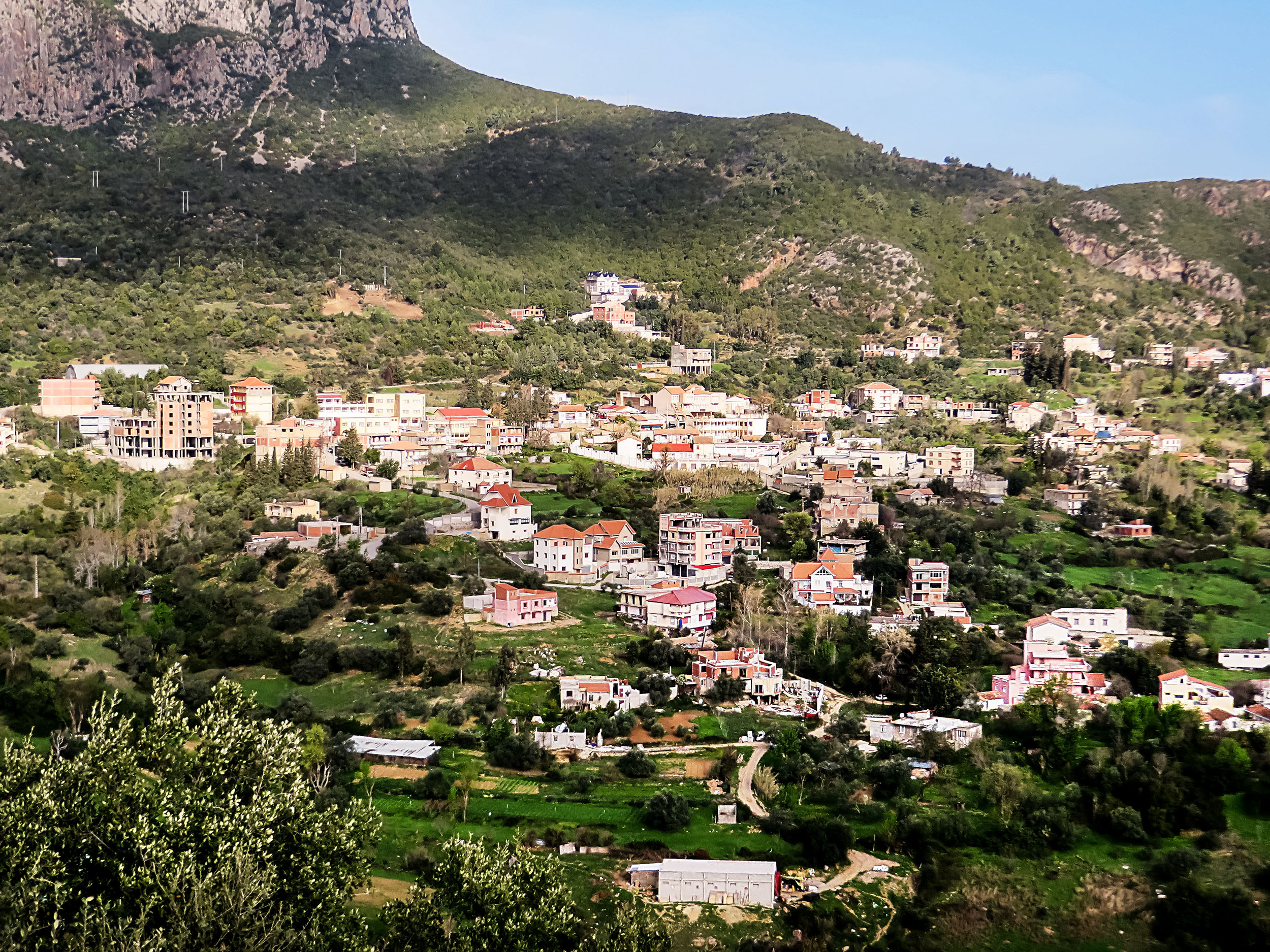

- Location within Algeria
- Country: Algeria
- Province: Béjaïa
- Time zone: UTC+1 (West Africa Time)

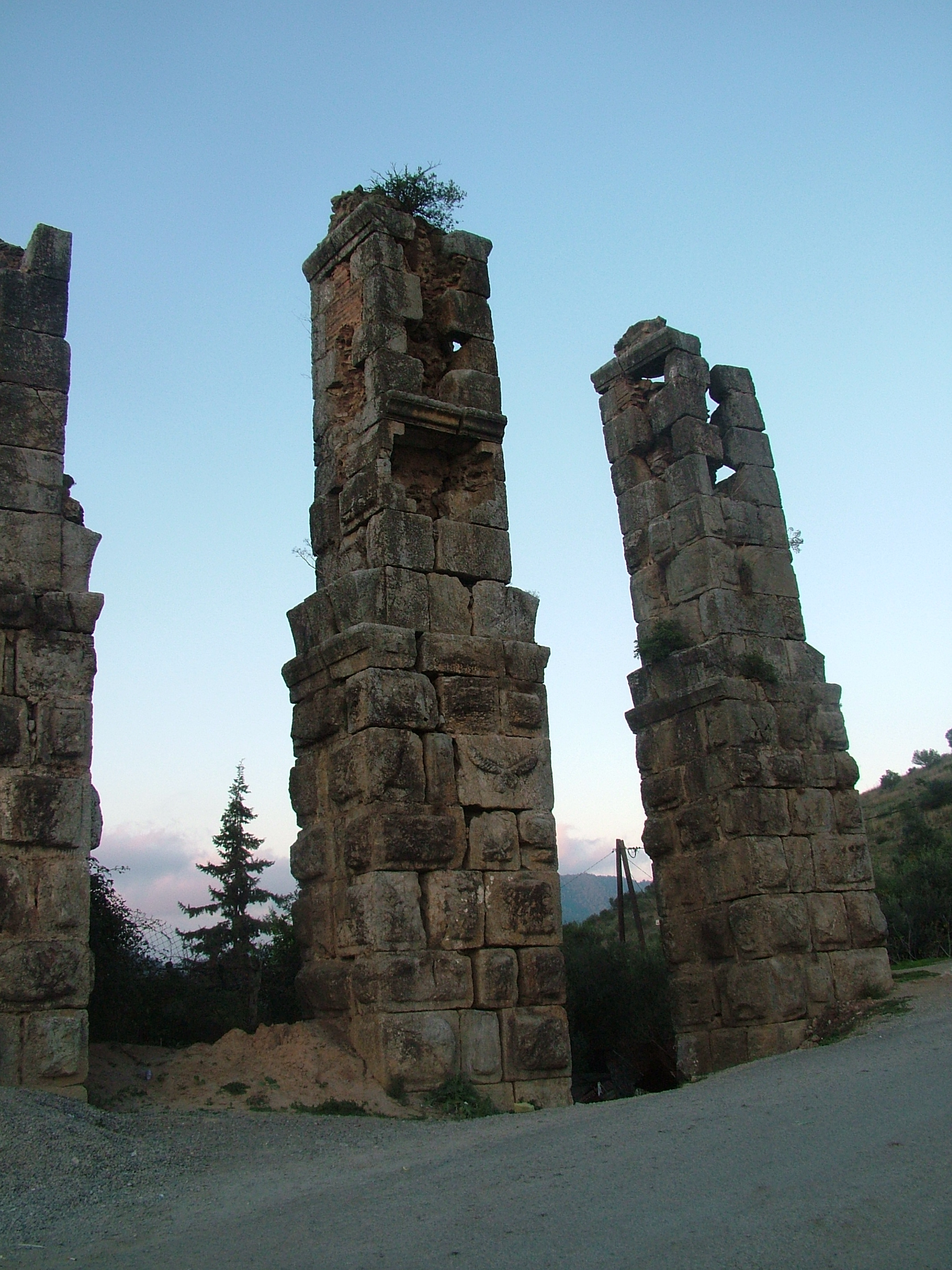
Saldae Aqueduct

Toudja (Kabyle: Tuǧa) is a commune in northern Algeria in the Béjaïa Province in the Kabylia region. The liberal pied noir writer Jules Roy discussed it in his book on the Algerian war of independence.

Oranges are grown widely in the area. In Roman times its springs were an important source of water and there was an aqueduct taking water to the city of Saldae (now Béjaïa).

== Relief, Geology, Hydrography ==
In Toudja, one can find the orange plantations of Toudja, from which famous springs emerge from the rock. These springs were once captured by the Romans to supply drinking water to Saldae. Even today, they can still provide a large water flow to provide for the city.
