= Nassim Benkhodja =

Algerian footballer (born 1985)

Personal information
- Full name: Nassim Benkhodja
- Date of birth: February 2, 1985 (age 41)
- Place of birth: Krasnodar, Soviet Union
- Position: Goalkeeper

Team information
- Current team: MC El Eulma
- Number: 1

Youth career
- ASFJ Béjaïa
- MO Béjaïa
- 2001–2003: Lycee Sportif de Draria

Senior career*
Years	Team	Apps	(Gls)
–2007	US Tichy	-	(-)
2007–2008	NA Hussein Dey	0	(0)
2009–2010	A Bou Saâda	-	(-)
2010–2011	AS Khroub	20	(0)
2011–2013	ES Sétif	14	(0)
2013–2014	CA Bordj Bou Arreridj	?	(0)
2014–2015	JS Saoura	?	(0)
2015–2016	JSM Béjaïa	?	(0)
2016–2017	USM Aïn Beïda	?	(0)
2017–2018	JS Djijel	?	(0)
2018–	MC El Eulma	?	(0)

International career
2001–2002	Algeria U17	-	(-)
2003	Algeria U20	-	(-)
- * Club domestic league appearances and goals as of 00:00, March 16, 2012 (UTC)

Nassim Benkhodja (born February 2, 1985) is an Algerian football player. He currently plays for MC El Eulma in the Algerian Ligue Professionnelle 2.

== Personal ==
Benkhodja was born on February 2, 1985, in Krasnodar, Soviet Union, to an Algerian father and a Russian mother. At the age of 1, he moved back with his family to Algeria.

== Career ==
Benkhodja began his career at the ASFJB, a football academy in Béjaïa. His youth career also included time with MO Béjaïa and Lycee Sportif de Draria, where he played with Mohamed Lamine Zemmamouche.

== Honours ==
- Won the Algerian Cup once with ES Sétif in 2012
