= Oussama Mesfar =

Algerian footballer (born 1989)

Personal information
- Full name: Oussama Mesfar
- Date of birth: 28 March 1989 (age 37)
- Position: Forward

Team information
- Current team: CA Bordj Bou Arreridj

Senior career*
Years	Team	Apps	(Gls)
2009–2012	AS Khroub	66	(11)
2012–2014	CA Bordj Bou Arreridj	49	(4)
2014	CRB Aïn Fakroun	13	(1)
2015	CA Batna	13	(5)
2015	USM Blida	8	(0)
2016-2017	CA Batna	39	(2)
2017	O Medea	5	(1)
2018	CA Batna	12	(0)
2018-2019	HB Chelghoum Laïd		
2019-2023	ES Mostaganem		

International career^{‡}
2009–2011	Algeria U23	13	(4)
- * Club domestic league appearances and goals as of 00:00, 17 October 2017 (UTC) ‡ National team caps and goals as of 00:00, 17 October 2017 (UTC)

Oussama Mesfar (born 25 March 1989) is an Algerian footballer. He is currently playing as a forward for ES Mostaganem in the Algerian Ligue Professionnelle 1.

== International career ==
On 22 December 2009 Mesfar was called up to the Algerian Under-23 national team by head coach Azzedine Aït Djoudi for a week long training camp. On 15 December 2010 Mesfar scored two goals against Cameroon's Under-23 team in the opening game of the 2010 UNAF U-23 Tournament, as Algeria went on to win the game 6–1.

Won the 2010 UNAF U-23 Tournament with the Algerian team, and finished top scorer of the competition
