= Hamza Bounab =

Algerian footballer (1984–2012)

Personal information
- Date of birth: 16 December 1983
- Place of birth: El Khroub, Algeria
- Date of death: 23 June 2012 (aged 28)
- Position: Midfielder

Senior career*
Years	Team	Apps	(Gls)
2001–2005	AS Khroub		
2005–2007	CR Belouizdad		
2007	MO Constantine		
2007–2008	CA Batna		
2008–2009	MO Béjaïa		
2009–2010	CA Bordj Bou Arréridj		
2010–2012	AS Khroub		
- * Club domestic league appearances and goals

Hamza Bounab (16 December 1983 – 23 June 2012) was an Algerian professional footballer who played as a midfielder for AS Khroub, CR Belouizdad, MO Constantine, CA Batna, MO Béjaïa and CA Bordj Bou Arréridj.

== Career ==
In the 2011–12 season Bounab was relegated from the Algerian Ligue Professionnelle 1 with AS Khroub.

== Death ==
Bounab died on 23 June 2012 at the age of 28 after suffering a heart attack during a charity football match. As a tribute to him, AS Khroub decided to retire his number 17.
