= El Almi Daoudi =

Algerian footballer (born 1985)

Personal information
- Full name: El Almi Daoudi
- Date of birth: September 26, 1985 (age 41)
- Place of birth: Tébessa, Algeria
- Position: Midfielder

Team information
- Current team: MC El Eulma

Senior career*
| Years | Team | Apps | (Gls) |
| 2007–2010 | AS Khroub | - | (-) |
| 2010–2012 | MC Alger | 40 | (2) |
| 2012– | MC El Eulma | 1 | (0) |
- * Club domestic league appearances and goals as of 00:00, January 23, 2012 (UTC)

El Almi Daoudi (born September 26, 1985) is an Algerian footballer. He currently plays for MC El Eulma in the Algerian Ligue Professionnelle 1.
