= Mohamed Amroune =

Algerian football player (born 1983)

Personal information
- Full name: Mohamed Seif Edine Amroune
- Date of birth: 25 May 1983 (age 43)
- Place of birth: Constantine, Algeria
- Height: 1.82 m (6 ft 0 in)
- Position: Forward

Senior career*
| Years | Team | Apps | (Gls) |
| 2003–2005 | CS Constantine | - | (-) |
| 2005–2007 | CR Belouizdad | - | (-) |
| 2007–2009 | RAEC Mons | 1 | (0) |
| 2009–2010 | MSP Batna | 6 | (1) |
| 2010–2011 | MO Constantine | - | (-) |
| 2011–2012 | CR Belouizdad | 5 | (1) |

International career^{‡}
| 2007 | Algeria | 1 | (0) |
- * Club domestic league appearances and goals ‡ National team caps and goals as of 00:00, 13 May 2011 (UTC)

Mohamed Seif Edine Amroune (Arabic: محمد سيف الدين عمرون; born 25 May 1983) is an Algerian football player.

== Club career ==
In 2003, Amroune began his senior career with his hometown club of CS Constantine. In 2005, he joined CR Belouizdad.

=== RAEC Mons ===
In July 2007, Amroune went on trial with Belgian club S.V. Zulte Waregem. However, two days later, he signed a four-year contract with another Belgian club, R.A.E.C. Mons. On 12 August 2008 he made his debut for the club as a substitute in the 78th minute in a league game against Mechelen. On 5 January 2009 Amroune left the club after agreeing to terminate his contract by mutual consent. He made just one appearance during his time with the club, after failing to recover properly from his injury.

On 17 January 2009 Amroune went on trial with Portuguese club Naval. In July 2009, Amroune went on trial with French Championnat National side Troyes.

== International career ==
On 24 March 2007 Amroune made his debut for the Algerian National Team in a 2008 Africa Cup of Nations qualifier against Cape Verde. Amroune started the game on the bench and replaced Hamer Bouazza in the 88th minute as Algeria won the game 2–0.
