= Abed Hamdani Stadium =

Sports venue in El Khroub, Algeria

Coordinates: 36.260596°N 6.687441°E

- Interactive map of Abed Hamdani Stadium
- Location: El Khroub, Algeria
- Capacity: 10,000
- Surface: Artificial turf

Tenant
- AS Khroub

Abed Hamdani Stadium (Arabic: ملعب عابد حمداني) is a multi-use stadium in El Khroub, Algeria. It is currently used mostly for football matches and is the home ground of Algerian Ligue Professionnelle 2 side AS Khroub. The stadium has an official capacity of 10,000 people.
