= El Khroub =

Coordinates: 36°16′N 6°42′E

Lkhroub ⵍⵅⵔⵓⴱ لخروب
- Commune and town
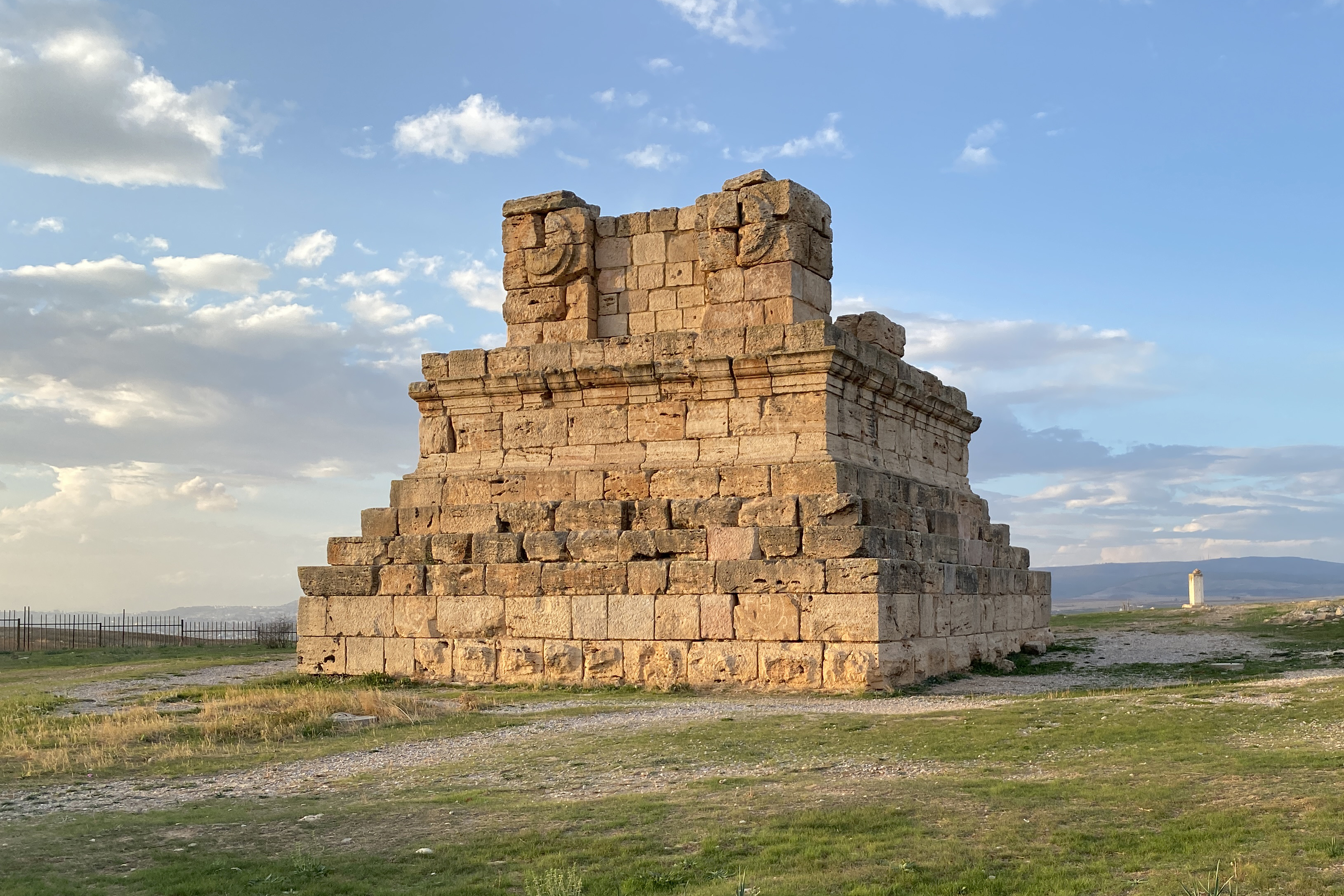
- Tomb of Massinissa at El-Khroub

- Country: Algeria
- Province: Constantine Province

Government

Area
  - Total: 94.46 sq mi (244.65 km^{2})

Population (2008)
  - Total: 279,812
- Time zone: UTC+1 (CET)
- 2506: 25100

El Khroub (Amazigh: ⵍⵅⵔⵓⴱ, Arabic: الخروب) is a town and commune in Constantine Province, Algeria. According to the 2008 census it has a population of 179,033. it is a city in eastern Algeria, located a few kilometers from the city of Constantine. El Khroub is known for its archaeological site housing the tomb of Massinissa, around which a new city of the same name (Massinissa) was built.

== Demographics ==
El Khroub
Year	Pop.	±%
1977	14,962	—
1987	42,261	+182.5%
1998	88,498	+109.4%
2019	279,523	+215.9%

El Khroub is the second most populous commune in the wilaya of Constantine after Constantine, according to the 2008 general population and housing census, the population of the commune is estimated at 179,033 inhabitants compared to 14,962 in 1977, it is the commune of the wilaya of Constantine that recorded the highest annual growth rate (7.3% compared to 1.5% for the wilaya as a whole), over the period 2008-1998.

== History ==
10 km east of the city, on the National Road 20, there is the site of Bou Nouara known for its dolmens.

== Localities ==
In addition to its capital El Khroub-ville, the commune of El Khroub was composed at its creation in 1984 of the following localities: Lambièche, Dahbia, Kassandji, Salah Derradji, Baaraouia, Aïn Nahas, Aïn Leghda, Sidi Amor, Oullaza, Oued Hamim, Massine, Sidi Lakhdar, El Meridj, Draa Naga, Aïn Guerfa, Bouragba, Atfa, Sedjar, Legiuari, Zbir, Soumaâ, Guechguèche Ouest, Ferme Chibani, Chaabet El Khourchef, Tikbab, Bir Dekkiche, Kadri Farm, Aïn Berda, Medalssou, Aïn Nachfa, Boulechfar Farm, Aïn Kahla.

Currently, the commune is composed of the capital agglomeration, El Khroub-ville, the secondary agglomerations of Salah Derradji, Brahmia Brothers, Ali Mendjeli, Oued Hamimine, Chelia, Allouk Abdellah, Aïn N'Hasse, Maoualkia and Darih.

== Economy ==
The city is known for its weekly market, considered the second largest in eastern Algeria after Tadjenanet (wilaya of Mila).

It is also known by the presence of the headquarters of the Imam Zuuhri Library.

== Twin Towns/Cities ==
The city of El Khroub maintains decentralized cooperation relations with:

- France, Mulhouse since 31 May 2000.
