= AS Khroub =

Algerian football club

Association Sportive d'El Khroub
- Full name: Association Sportive d'El Khroub
- Nicknames: Les Rouges, Tombeau de Massinissa
- Founded: 11 May 1927; 99 years ago
- Ground: Abed Hamdani Stadium
- Capacity: 8,000
- League: Ligue 2
- 2025–26: Ligue 2, Group Centre-east, 13th of 16
Home colours	Away colours	Third colours

Association Sportive d'El Khroub (Arabic: الجمعية الرياضية للخروب), known as AS Khroub or simply ASK for short, is an Algerian football club in the city of El Khroub in Constantine Province. Founded in 1927. The club colours are white and Red. Their home stadium, Abed Hamdani Stadium, has a capacity of 8,000 spectators. The club is currently playing in the Algerian Ligue 2.

== History ==
On 1 May 2020, AS Khroub were promoted to the Algerian Ligue 2 .

On 28 May 2022, AS Khroub were promoted to the Algerian Ligue 2.
