= 2015–16 USM Alger season =

USM Alger
2015–16 season
- Chairman: Ali Haddad
- Head coach: Mounir Zeghdoud (c); Mahieddine Meftah (c) (until 1 July 2015); Miloud Hamdi (from 1 July 2015)
- Stadium: Omar Hammadi Stadium
- Ligue 1: 1st
- Algerian Cup: Round of 64
- Champions League: Runners–up
- Top goalscorer: League: Mohamed Seguer (9 goals); All: Mohamed Seguer (12 goals)
Home colours	Away colours	Third colours

In the 2015–16 season, USM Alger competed in the Ligue 1 for the 38th season, as well as the CAF Champions League, and the Algerian Cup.. It was their 21st consecutive season in the top flight of Algerian football.

== Squad list ==
Players and squad numbers last updated on 27 May 2016.
Note: Flags indicate national team as has been defined under FIFA eligibility rules. Players may hold more than one non-FIFA nationality.

No.	Name	Nat.	Position	Date of birth (age)	Signed from	Apps.	Goals	Signed in	Contract ends	Transfer fees
Goalkeepers
1	(Algeria)	GK	Mohamed Lamine Zemmamouche	19 March 1985 (aged 30)	(Algeria) MC Alger	260	0	2012	2020	Free transfer
27	(Algeria)	GK	Mourad Berrefane	18 March 1986 (aged 29)	(Algeria) MO Béjaïa	17	0	2014	2016	Free transfer
16	(Algeria)	GK	Ismaïl Mansouri	7 January 1988 (aged 27)	(Algeria) MO Béjaïa	48	0	2008	2017	Loan Return
Defenders
3	(Algeria)	CB / LB	Ayoub Abdellaoui	16 February 1993 (aged 22)	(Algeria) Reserve team	29	0	2011	2016	Youth system
6	(Algeria)	CB	Farouk Chafaï	23 June 1990 (aged 25)	(Algeria) Reserve team	155	11	2010	2016	Youth system
20	(Algeria)	CB	Nacereddine Khoualed (C)	16 April 1986 (aged 29)	(Algeria) US Biskra	275	9	2006	2018	Free transfer
25	(Algeria)	LB / LM / LW	Mokhtar Benmoussa	1 August 1986 (aged 29)	(Algeria) ES Sétif	133	10	2012	2016	Free transfer
26	(Algeria)	LB	Brahim Boudebouda	28 August 1990 (aged 25)	(France) Le Mans FC	105	11	2012	2016	Free transfer
30	(Algeria)	RB	Mohamed Rabie Meftah	5 May 1985 (aged 30)	(Algeria) JSM Béjaïa	138	25	2011	2017	Free transfer
5	(Algeria)	CB	Arslane Mazari	6 January 1989 (aged 26)	(Algeria) USM El Harrach	16	0	2015	2017	Free transfer
19	(Algeria)	CB	Houcine Benayada	8 August 1992 (aged 23)	(Algeria) ASM Oran	19	0	2015	2017	Free transfer
Midfielders
7	(Algeria)	RW / AM	Zinedine Ferhat	1 March 1993 (aged 22)	(Algeria) Reserve team	138	8	2011	2018	Youth system
10	(Algeria)	LW / RW / AM	Youcef Belaïli	27 January 1992 (aged 23)	(Tunisia) Espérance de Tunis	41	13	2014	2016	Free transfer
11	(Algeria)	DM	Hocine El Orfi	27 January 1987 (aged 28)	(Algeria) Paradou AC	84	0	2012	2016	Free transfer
13	(Algeria)	CM / DM	Nassim Bouchema	5 May 1988 (aged 27)	(Algeria) MC Alger	134	6	2011	2017	Free transfer
23	(Algeria)	DM / RM	Hamza Koudri	15 December 1987 (aged 28)	(Algeria) MC Alger	124	3	2012	2017	Free transfer
24	(Algeria)	DM	Mohammed Benkhemassa	28 June 1993 (aged 22)	(Algeria) Reserve team	46	1	2011	2016	Youth system
28	(Algeria)	AM	Karim Baïteche	10 July 1991 (aged 24)	(Algeria) Reserve team	55	5	2010	2017	Youth system
8	(Algeria)	AM	Kaddour Beldjilali	28 November 1988 (aged 27)	(Tunisia) Étoile du Sahel	35	4	2014	2017	400,000 €
15	(Algeria)	CM	Djamel Chettal	23 May 1992 (aged 23)	(Algeria) Reserve team	21	1	2012	2017	Loan Return
Forwards
9	(Madagascar)	CF	Carolus Andriamatsinoro	6 September 1989 (aged 26)	(Algeria) Paradou AC	99	15	2012	2019	Undisclosed
14	(Algeria)	ST	Rachid Nadji	15 April 1989 (aged 26)	(Algeria) ES Sétif	51	12	2014	2016	Free transfer
18	(Algeria)	CF / RW / LW	Mohamed Seguer	19 January 1985 (aged 30)	(Algeria) ASO Chlef	92	20	2012	2016	Free transfer
22	(Algeria)	ST	Oussama Darfalou	29 September 1993 (aged 22)	(Algeria) RC Arbaâ	13	4	2015	2018	150,000 €
21	(Algeria)	ST	Mohamed Amine Aoudia	6 June 1987 (aged 28)	(Germany) FSV Frankfurt	20	4	2015	2016	150,000 €

== Transfers ==
=== In ===
Date	Position	Player	From club	Transfer fee	Source
7 June 2015	DF	(Algeria) Arslane Mazari	USM El Harrach	Free transfer	
13 June 2015	GK	(Algeria) Ismaïl Mansouri	MO Béjaïa	Loan Return	
16 June 2015	DF	(Algeria) Houcine Benayada	ASM Oran	Free transfer	
8 July 2015	MF	(Algeria) Oussama Darfalou	RC Arbaâ	€ 150,000	
25 July 2015	MF	(Algeria) Mohamed Amine Aoudia	(Germany) FSV Frankfurt	€ 150,000	
5 January 2016	MF	(Algeria) Djamel Chettal	MO Béjaïa	Loan Return	

=== Out ===
Date	Position	Player	To club	Transfer fee	Source
10 June 2015	MF	(Algeria) Bouazza Feham	CR Belouizdad	Free transfer	
15 June 2015	MF	(Algeria) Abdelkader Laïfaoui	USM Blida	Free transfer	
1 July 2015	MF	(Algeria) Abderrahmane Bourdim	RC Relizane	Loan for one year	
8 July 2015	FW	(Algeria) Abderrahmane Meziane	RC Arbaâ	Loan for one year	
8 July 2015	FW	(Algeria) Mohamed Taib	RC Arbaâ	Loan for one year	
8 July 2015	GK	(Algeria) Sid Ahmed Rafik Mazouzi	RC Arbaâ	Free transfer	
27 July 2015	DF	(Algeria) Mohamed Amrane	DRB Tadjenanet	Free transfer	
27 July 2015	FW	(Ivory Coast) Manucho	RC Relizane	Loan for one year	

== Pre-season and friendlies ==
3 July 2015 Friendly	USM Alger	1–1	USM El Harrach	Algiers
23:00				Stadium: Stade Omar Hammadi

15 July 2015 Friendly	USM Alger	3–4	JS Saoura	Algiers
23:00				Stadium: Stade Omar Hammadi

8 March 2016 Friendly	WA Tlemcen	1–2	USM Alger	Tlemcen
16:00				Stadium: Stade Akid Lotfi

== Competitions ==
=== Overview ===
Competition	Record								Started round	Final position / round	First match	Last match
Competition	G	W	D	L	GF	GA	GD	Win %	Started round	Final position / round	First match	Last match
Ligue 1	30	17	7	6	49	31	+18	56.67	—N/a	Winners	13 August 2015	27 May 2015
Algerian Cup	1	0	0	1	1	3	−2	0.00	Round of 64		17 December 2015	
Champions League	10	6	1	3	12	8	+4	60.00	Group stage	Runners–up	27 June 2015	8 November 2015
Total	41	23	8	10	62	42	+20	56.10				

=== Ligue 1 ===
==== League table ====
Pos	Team	Pld	W	D	L	GF	GA	GD	Pts	Qualification or relegation
1	USM Alger (C)	30	17	7	6	49	31	+18	58	Qualification for the Champions League first round
2	JS Saoura	30	12	12	6	39	25	+14	48	Qualification for the Champions League preliminary round
3	JS Kabylie	30	12	9	9	27	27	0	45 (Note: JS Kabylie ahead of CR Belouizdad on head-to-head record: JSK–CRB 1–0, CRB–JSK 1–1.)	Qualification for the Confederation Cup preliminary round
4	CR Belouizdad	30	11	12	7	40	29	+11	45	
5	ES Sétif	30	11	11	8	31	19	+12	44 (Note: ES Sétif ahead of MO Béjaïa on head-to-head record: ESS–MOB 0–0, MOB–ESS 0–0.)	

Updated to match(es) played on 27 May 2016. Source: DZFoot
Rules for classification: 1) points; 2) head-to-head points; 3) head-to-head goal difference; 4) goal difference; 5) total goals; 6) fairplay ranking; 7) playoff.
(C) Champions

==== Results summary ====
Overall								Home						Away					
Pld	W	D	L	GF	GA	GD	Pts	W	D	L	GF	GA	GD	W	D	L	GF	GA	GD
30	17	7	6	49	31	+18	58	11	4	1	31	13	+18	6	3	5	18	18	0

Last updated: 27 May 2016.
Source: Competitive matches

==== Results by round ====
Round	1	2	3	4	5	6	7	8	9	10	11	12	13	14	15	16	17	18	19	20	21	22	23	24	25	26	27	28	29	30
Ground	A	H	A	H	A	H	A	A	H	A	H	A	H	A	H	H	A	H	A	H	A	H	H	A	H	A	H	A	H	A
Result	L	W	W	W	W	W	W	W	D	D	D	W	W	W	W	D	D	W	L	D	W	W	W	L	L	D	W	L	W	W
Position	13	10	5	2	1	2	3	1	1	1	1	1	1	1	1	1	1	1	1	1	1	1	1	1	1	1	1	1	1	1

Updated to match(es) played on 27 May 2016. Source: Competitive matches
A = Away; H = Home; W = Win; D = Draw; L = Loss

==== Matches ====
Win Draw Loss

15 August 2015 Round 1	NA Hussein Dey	2–1	USM Alger	Belouizdad
17:00	Gasmi 32' (pen.); Benaldjia (yellow card) 33'; Bendebka 67'; Boussouf (yellow card) 35' (yellow-red card) 90+3'	Soccerway Report; Live TV: None	48' Seguer; (yellow card) 65' Zemmamouche; (yellow card) 75' Khoualed; (red card) 90+3' Chafaï	Stadium: Stade 20 Août 1955; Referee: Mohamed Benouza

25 August 2015 Round 2	USM Alger	2–1	ES Sétif	Bologhine
18:00	Benkhemassa (yellow card) 23'; Khoualed 26'; Belaïli 39'; Seguer (yellow card) 43'; Koudri (yellow card) 90'	Soccerway Report; Live TV: Algérie 3 / TV Tamazight 4	(yellow card) 45+1' Benlamri; (yellow card) 61' Ziaya; 90+4' (pen.) Benyettou	Stadium: Stade Omar Hamadi; Referee: Mohamed Ghorbal

29 August 2015 Round 3	JS Kabylie	0–1	USM Alger	Tizi Ouzou
18:00	Malo (yellow card) 49'	Soccerway Report; Live TV: None	(yellow card) 35' Mazari; (yellow card) 37' Meftah; 82' Belaïli	Stadium: Stade 1er Novembre 1954; Referee: Lahlou Benbraham

15 September 2015 Round 4	USM Alger	3–2	MC Oran	Bologhine
19:00	Meftah 20' (pen.); Seguer 55'; Belaïli 80' (pen.); Mazari (yellow card) 84'; Nadji (yellow card) 90'	Soccerway Report; Live TV: None	(yellow card) 45' Moussi; 48' Benyahia; (yellow card) 73' Bellabès; 90+3' Za'abia	Stadium: Omar Hamadi Stadium; Referee: Mehdi Abid Charef

19 September 2015 Round 5	CS Constantine	0–2	USM Alger	Constantine
17:00	Djeghbala (yellow card) 8'; Ahmed (yellow card) 54'; Aksas (yellow card) 79'; Bencherifa (yellow card) 80'	Soccerway Report; Live TV: Algérie 3	(yellow card) 6' Benkhemassa; (yellow card) 29' Beldjilali; 60' (yellow card) 61' Andria; (yellow card) 75' Khoualed; 80' (pen.) Aoudia	Stadium: Stade Mohamed Hamlaoui; Referee: Farouk Mial

12 October 2015 Round 6	USM Alger	3–2	MO Béjaïa	Bologhine
18:00	Nadji (yellow card) 25' (goal) 48'; Seguer 53'; Abdellaoui (yellow card) 55'; Meftah 67' (pen.); Koudri (yellow card) 81'; Benmoussa (yellow card) 85'	Soccerway Report; Live TV: None	38' Salhi; 59' Ndoye; (yellow card) 66' Sidibe	Stadium: Omar Hamadi Stadium; Referee: Abderrezzak Arab

17 October 2015 Round 8	CR Belouizdad	1–2	USM Alger	Algiers
16:00	Feham 18' (pen.); Derrag (yellow card) 27'; Cheurfaoui (yellow card) 77'	Soccerway Report	(yellow card) 18' Zemmamouche; 45' Seguer; 47' Nadji	Stadium: Stade 5 Juillet 1962; Referee: Boubekeur Zouaoui

20 October 2015 Round 7	RC Arbaâ	1–2	USM Alger	Larbaâ
16:00	Guessan 30' (yellow card) 65'; Bensalem (yellow card) 71'; Yettou (yellow card) 79'	Soccerway Report; Live TV: None	8' Andria; 89' Boudebouda	Stadium: Stade Ismaïl Makhlouf; Referee: Marzouk Brahimi

24 October 2015 Round 9	USM Alger	2–2	RC Relizane	Bologhine
18:00	Benmoussa 14' (yellow card) 65'; Benkhemassa (yellow card) 36'; Meftah 70'; Chafaï (yellow card) 85'; Koudri (yellow card) 90+3'	Soccerway Report; Live TV: None	(yellow card) 10' Zakaria; 48' Tiaiba; (yellow card) 51' Bitam; 66' Benabderahmane; (yellow card) 80' Megherbi	Stadium: Omar Hamadi Stadium; Referee: Lahlou Benbraham

21 November 2015 Round 12	ASM Oran	0–2	USM Alger	Oran
15:00	Sebbah (yellow card) 2'; Haddad (yellow card) 18'	Soccerway Report	(yellow card) 4' Chafaï; (yellow card) 63' Benkhemassa; 75' (pen.) Meftah; 82' Andria	Stadium: Stade Habib Bouakeul; Referee: Redouane Necib

24 November 2015 Round 10	JS Saoura	1–1	USM Alger	Béchar
18:00	Sayah 52'; Djemili (yellow card) 68'; Merbah (yellow card) 70'	Soccerway Report; Live TV: None	(yellow card) 81' Andria; 83' (yellow card) 84' Baïteche	Stadium: Stade 20 Août 1955; Referee: Mohamed Boukhalfa

28 November 2015 Round 13	USM Alger	2–1	USM El Harrach	Algiers
16:00	Seguer 13', 42' (yellow card) 90'	Soccerway Report; Live TV: beIN Sports / Canal Algérie / Al Kass Sports	45+3' Younes	Stadium: Stade 5 Juillet 1962; Referee: Farouk Houasnia

12 December 2015 Round 14	DRB Tadjenanet	1–2	USM Alger	Tadjenanet
15:00	Aib Achref (yellow card) 23' (yellow-red card) 59'; Sayoud 44' (pen.); Tembeng (yellow card) 57'	Soccerway Report; Live TV: Canal Algérie	9' Chafaï; (yellow card) 30' Boudebouda; (yellow card) 33' Benmoussa; (yellow card) 41' Benayada; (yellow card) 65' El Orfi; 79' (pen.) Meftah; (yellow card) 80' Koudri	Stadium: Stade Laghouat Smail; Referee: Lahlou Benbraham

22 December 2015 Round 11	USM Alger	0–0	MC Alger	Algiers
18:00	Meftah (yellow card) 45'; Benkhemassa (yellow card) 45'; Koudri (yellow card) 74'; Chafaï (yellow card) 90'	Soccerway Report; Live TV: beIN Sports / Canal Algérie / Al Kass Sports	(yellow card) 31' Karaoui; (yellow card) 73' Bouhenna	Stadium: Stade 5 Juillet 1962; Attendance: 60.000; Referee: Mohamed Benouza

26 December 2015 Round 15	USM Alger	3–0	USM Blida	Bologhine
16:00	Andria 22'; Nadji 36'; Chafaï 45+1'	Soccerway Report; Live TV: None	(yellow card) 45' Laïfaoui	Stadium: Omar Hamadi Stadium; Referee: Farouk Mial

14 January 2016 Round 16	USM Alger	1–1	NA Hussein Dey	Algiers
18:00	Khoualed (yellow card) 14'; Nadji 16'; Beldjilali (yellow card) 30'; Koudri (yellow card) 86'	Soccerway Report; Live TV: TV Tamazight 4 / beIN Sports / Canal Algérie	15' (pen.) (yellow card) 90' Gasmi	Stadium: Stade 5 Juillet 1962; Referee: Mohamed Ghorbal

23 January 2016 Round 17	ES Sétif	1–1	USM Alger	Sétif
16:00	Arroussi 43'	Soccerway Report; Live TV: Canal Algérie / Al Kass Sports	26' Chafaï	Stadium: Stade 8 Mai 1945; Referee: Farouk Mial

30 January 2016 Round 18	USM Alger	2–0	JS Kabylie	Bologhine
16:00	Benkhemassa (yellow card) 13'; Nadji 75'; Boudebouda 90'	Soccerway Report; Live TV: Canal Algérie / Al Kass Sports	(yellow card) 29' Ferhani	Stadium: Omar Hamadi Stadium; Referee: Mohamed Boukhalfa

6 February 2016 Round 19	MC Oran	2–1	USM Alger	Oran
16:00	Zubya 75'; Benyahia 77'; Natèche (yellow card) 90'	Soccerway Report; Live TV: Canal Algérie	(yellow card) 47' Benkhemassa; 71' Aoudia	Stadium: Stade Ahmed Zabana; Referee: Lahlou Benbraham

12 February 2016 Round 20	USM Alger	1–1	CS Constantine	Bologhine
18:00	Boudebouda 82'	Soccerway Report; Live TV: None	(yellow card) 15' (goal) 48' Voavy; (yellow card) 13' (yellow-red card) 90' Guerabis	Stadium: Omar Hamadi Stadium; Referee: Merzoug Brahimi

23 February 2016 Round 21	MO Béjaïa	0–1	USM Alger	Béjaïa
16:00	Ndoye (red card) 15'; Lakhdari (yellow card) 22'; Messaoudi (yellow card) 64'; Benali (yellow card) 82'	Soccerway Report; Live TV: None	83' (pen.) Meftah; (yellow card) 86' Boudebouda; (yellow card) 90' Mansouri	Stadium: Stade de l'Unité Maghrébine; Attendance: 0 (close doors); Referee: Mohamed Benouza

12 March 2016 Round 22	USM Alger	4–0	RC Arbaâ	Bologhine
18:00	Darfalou 29'; Seguer 42'; Nadji 76'; Benmoussa 86'	Soccerway Report; Live TV: TV Tamazight 4	(yellow card) 89' Achiou	Stadium: Omar Hamadi Stadium; Referee: Mohamed Bachir

18 March 2016 Round 23	USM Alger	2–0	CR Belouizdad	Algiers
18:00	Seguer 40'; Abdellaoui (yellow card) 81'; Meftah (yellow card) 84' (goal) 90+2'	Soccerway Report; Live TV: TV Tamazight 4	(yellow card) 38' (yellow-red card) 77' Bencherifa	Stadium: Stade 5 Juillet 1962; Referee: Farouk Houasnia

1 April 2016 Round 24	RC Relizane	3–0	USM Alger	Relizane
15:00	Tiaïba 40', 79' (pen.); Manucho 62'	Soccerway Report; Live TV: None	(yellow card) 60' Beldjilali; (yellow card) 71' Berrefane	Stadium: Stade Tahar Zoughari; Attendance: 0 (close doors); Referee: Ahmed Bouzrar

9 April 2016 Round 25	USM Alger	1–2	JS Saoura	Bologhine
17:00	Koudri (yellow card) 61'; Meftah 70' (pen.)	Soccerway Report; Live TV: None	65' Zaidi; 90' Hamia	Stadium: Omar Hamadi Stadium; Referee: Lahlou Benbraham

22 April 2016 Round 26	MC Alger	2–2	USM Alger	Algiers
17:00	Hachoud 79', 87'; Demmou (yellow card) 34'	Soccerway Report; Live TV: beIN Sports / Canal Algérie / Al Kass Sports	26' Nadji; 67' (yellow card) 75' Darfalou; (yellow card) 81' Seguer	Stadium: Stade 5 Juillet 1962; Attendance: 80.000; Referee: Farouk Mial

30 April 2016 Round 27	USM Alger	3–0	ASM Oran	Bologhine
16:00	Darfalou 46'; Benmoussa 57'; Seguer 65'	Soccerway Report; Live TV: None	(yellow card) 62' Djemaouni; (yellow card) 86' Benkablia	Stadium: Omar Hamadi Stadium; Referee: Mohammed Hansal

13 May 2016 Round 28	USM El Harrach	3–0	USM Alger	Algiers
17:30	Bouguèche 14'; Younes 85'; Mellal 90+3'	Soccerway Report; Live TV: None	(yellow card) 80' Mazari	Stadium: Stade 5 Juillet 1962; Referee: Abderrazek Hallalchi

20 May 2016 Round 29	USM Alger	2–1	DRB Tadjenanet	Bologhine
17:30	Khoualed (yellow card) 20'; Benkhemassa (yellow card) 34'; Andria (yellow card) 41'; Koudri (yellow card) 45'; Aradji 64'; Darfalou 83'	Soccerway Report; Live TV: beIN Sports / TV Tamazight 4	(yellow card) 24' Daoud; (yellow card) 29' (yellow-red card) 69' Guitoune; (yellow card) 39' Hadded; 90+1' Chibane	Stadium: Omar Hamadi Stadium; Referee: Mohamed Benouza

27 May 2016 Round 30	USM Blida	1–0	USM Alger	Blida
17:30	Melika 55'	Soccerway Report; Live TV: None		Stadium: Brakni Brothers Stadium; Referee: Abderrezzak Arab

=== Algerian Cup ===
17 December 2015 Round of 64	USM Alger	1–3	Paradou AC	Bologhine
17:00	Aradji 37'; Khoualed (yellow card) 75'		23' Kherifi; 68' Attal; 81' Mansouri	Stadium: Stade Omar Hamadi; Referee: Helalchi, Brahim, Doulache

=== Champions League ===
==== Group stage ====
Pos	Team	Pld	W	D	L	GF	GA	GD	Pts	Qualification	USM	MER	ESS	MCE
1	(Algeria) USM Alger	6	5	0	1	9	3	+6	15	Advance to knockout stage	—	1–0	3–0	2–1
2	(Sudan) Al-Merrikh	6	4	1	1	9	4	+5	13	Advance to knockout stage	1–0	—	2–0	2–0
3	(Algeria) ES Sétif	6	1	2	3	5	10	−5	5		1–2	1–1	—	2–2
4	(Algeria) MC El Eulma	6	0	1	5	5	11	−6	1		0–1	2–3	0–1	—

Source: CAF
Rules for classification: Group stage tiebreakers

27 June 2015 1	ES Sétif (Algeria)	1–2	(Algeria) USM Alger	Sétif
22:30 UTC+1	Djahnit (yellow card) 13'; Korbiaa 84'	Report	(yellow card) 22' Koudri; (yellow card) 32' Ferhat; (yellow card) 57' (goal) 60' Seguer; 72' Khoualed; (yellow card) 78' Mansouri	Stadium: 8 May 1945 Stadium; Referee: Bakary Gassama (Gambia)

10 July 2015 2	USM Alger (Algeria)	1–0	(Sudan) Al-Merrikh SC	Algiers
22:30 UTC+1	Koudri (yellow card) 32'; Meftah (yellow card) 36'; Belaïli 53'	Report	(yellow card) 32' Saied; (yellow card) 35' Lebri; (yellow card) 77' Al-Madina	Stadium: Omar Hamadi Stadium; Referee: Mahamadou Keita (Mali)

24 July 2015 3	USM Alger (Algeria)	2–1	(Algeria) MC El Eulma	Algiers
20:30 UTC+1	Beldjilali 16'; Seguer 22'; Khoualed (yellow card) 35'; El Orfi (yellow card) 86'	Report	(yellow card) 13' Hammami; 40' Korichi; (yellow card) 80' Maïza	Stadium: Omar Hamadi Stadium; Referee: Bernard Camille (Seychelles)

7 August 2015 4	MC El Eulma (Algeria)	0–1	(Algeria) USM Alger	El Eulma
21:15 UTC+1	Bouzama (yellow card) 49'; Belkhiter (yellow card) 57'; Bentayeb (yellow card) 65'	Report	(yellow card) 29' Benkhemassa; 49' (yellow card) 79' Meftah; (yellow card) 69' El Orfi	Stadium: Messaoud Zougar Stadium; Referee: Eric Otogo-Castane (Gabon)

21 August 2015 5	USM Alger (Algeria)	3–0	(Algeria) ES Sétif	Algiers
20:30 UTC+1	Belaïli 34'; Beldjilali 37'; Benkhemassa (yellow card) 55'; Aoudia 74'; Ferhat (yellow card) 90+2'	Report	(yellow card) 48' Bouchar	Stadium: Omar Hamadi Stadium; Referee: Malang Diedhiou (Senegal)

11 September 2015 6	Al-Merrikh SC (Sudan)	1–0	(Algeria) USM Alger	Omdurman
20:30 UTC+3	Lebri 13'; Saied (yellow card) 34'	Report; Live TV: beIN Sports	(yellow card) 57' Abdellaoui	Stadium: Al-Merrikh Stadium; Referee: Gehad Grisha (Egypt)

==== Knockout stage ====
===== Semi-finals =====
25 September 2015 first leg	Al-Hilal (Sudan)	1–2	(Algeria) USM Alger	Omdurman
20:00 UTC+3	Careca 2'	Report	13' Aoudia; (yellow card) 23' Andria; (yellow card) 50' Meftah; 67' (yellow card) 67' Baïteche	Stadium: Al-Hilal Stadium; Referee: Janny Sikazwe (Zambia)

3 October 2015 Second leg	USM Alger (Algeria)	0–0 (2–1 agg.)	(Sudan) Al-Hilal	Algiers
21:30 UTC+1	Meftah (yellow card) 11'; Andria (yellow card) 84'	Report	(yellow card) 9' El Shighail; (yellow card) 23' Andrezinho; (yellow card) 35' Boya; (yellow card) 90+2' Hamid	Stadium: Omar Hamadi Stadium; Referee: Victor Gomes (South Africa)

===== Final =====
31 October 2015 first leg	USM Alger (Algeria)	1–2	(Democratic Republic of the Congo) TP Mazembe	Algiers
20:30 UTC+1	Seguer 88'	Report	27' Kalaba; 79' (pen.) Samatta	Stadium: Omar Hamadi Stadium; Referee: Gehad Grisha (Egypt)

8 November 2015 Second leg	TP Mazembe (Democratic Republic of the Congo)	2–0 (4–1 agg.)	(Algeria) USM Alger	Lubumbashi, DR Congo
15:30 UTC+2	Samatta 74' (pen.); Assalé 90+3'	Soccerway Report; Live TV: beIN Sports		Stadium: Stade TP Mazembe; Referee: Bakary Gassama (Gambia)

== Squad information ==
=== Appearances and goals ===
No.	Pos	Player	Nat	Ligue 1			Algerian Cup			Champions League			Total		
No.	Pos	Player	Nat	App	St	G	App	St	G	App	St	G	App	St	G
Goalkeepers
1	GK	Lamine Zemmamouche	(Algeria)	7	6	0	0	0	0	7	7	0	14	13	0
16	GK	Ismaïl Mansouri	(Algeria)	17	17	0	0	0	0	3	3	0	20	20	0
27	GK	Mourad Berrefane	(Algeria)	7	7	0	1	1	0	0	0	0	8	8	0
33	GK	Hossin Lagoun	(Algeria)	0	0	0	1	0	0	0	0	0	1	0	0
Defenders
3	DF	Ayoub Abdellaoui	(Algeria)	17	16	0	0	0	0	2	2	0	19	18	0
6	DF	Farouk Chafaï	(Algeria)	23	22	3	1	1	0	7	7	0	31	30	3
30	DF	Mohamed Rabie Meftah	(Algeria)	19	19	8	1	1	0	7	5	1	27	25	9
26	DF	Brahim Boudebouda	(Algeria)	16	16	3	1	1	0	8	8	0	25	25	3
5	DF	Arslane Mazari	(Algeria)	10	9	0	0	0	0	6	6	0	16	15	0
19	DF	Houcine Benayada	(Algeria)	14	13	0	1	1	0	4	4	0	19	18	0
20	DF	Nacereddine Khoualed	(Algeria)	24	24	1	1	1	0	7	7	1	32	32	2
25	DF	Mokhtar Benmoussa	(Algeria)	25	14	3	0	0	0	8	3	0	33	17	3
45	DF	Saâdi Radouani	(Algeria)	3	2	0	0	0	0	0	0	0	3	2	0
Midfielders
7	MF	Zinedine Ferhat	(Algeria)	20	18	0	0	0	0	9	9	0	29	27	0
10	MF	Youcef Belaïli	(Algeria)	4	4	3	0	0	0	5	5	2	9	9	5
13	MF	Nassim Bouchema	(Algeria)	8	8	0	0	0	0	2	0	0	10	8	0
23	MF	Hamza Koudri	(Algeria)	26	25	0	0	0	0	7	7	0	33	32	0
28	MF	Karim Baïteche	(Algeria)	8	3	1	0	0	0	6	4	1	14	7	2
8	MF	Kaddour Beldjilali	(Algeria)	17	12	0	1	1	0	7	6	2	25	19	2
24	MF	Mohammed Benkhemassa	(Algeria)	21	18	0	0	0	0	8	6	0	29	24	0
11	MF	Hocine El Orfi	(Algeria)	14	8	0	1	1	0	6	5	0	21	14	0
	MF	Djamel Chettal	(Algeria)	9	1	0	0	0	0	0	0	0	9	1	0
	MF	Mohamed Dilmi (Note: Player from USM Alger Reserve)	(Algeria)	1	1	0	0	0	0	0	0	0	1	1	0
	MF	Ramdane Bouguerra	(Algeria)	1	1	0	0	0	0	0	0	0	1	1	0
	MF	Riad Mokaddem	(Algeria)	1	0	0	0	0	0	0	0	0	1	0	0
Forwards
88	FW	Oualid Ardji	(Algeria)	10	4	1	1	1	1	0	0	0	11	5	2
21	FW	Mohamed Amine Aoudia	(Algeria)	13	4	2	1	1	0	6	4	2	20	9	4
22	FW	Oussama Darfalou	(Algeria)	11	7	4	0	0	0	2	0	0	13	7	4
18	FW	Mohamed Seguer	(Algeria)	23	21	9	1	0	0	7	5	3	31	26	12
14	FW	Rachid Nadji	(Algeria)	19	12	7	1	0	0	5	2	0	25	14	7
9	FW	Carolus Andriamatsinoro	(Madagascar)	23	20	4	1	1	0	7	5	0	31	26	4
Total				30		49	1		1	10		12	41		62

Last updated: 17 June 2022
Source: soccerway.com

=== Disciplinary record ===
No.	Pos.	Player	Ligue 1			Algerian Cup			Champions League			Total		
No.	Pos.	Player	Yellow card	(yellow card) (yellow-red card)	Red card	Yellow card	(yellow card) (yellow-red card)	Red card	Yellow card	(yellow card) (yellow-red card)	Red card	Yellow card	(yellow card) (yellow-red card)	Red card
1	GK	(Algeria) Lamine Zemmamouche	2	0	0	0	0	0	0	0	0	2	0	0
16	GK	(Algeria) Ismaïl Mansouri	1	0	0	0	0	0	1	0	0	2	0	0
27	GK	(Algeria) Mourad Berrefane	1	0	0	0	0	0	0	0	0	1	0	0
3	DF	(Algeria) Ayoub Abdellaoui	2	0	0	0	0	0	1	0	0	3	0	0
6	DF	(Algeria) Farouk Chafaï	4	0	1	0	0	0	0	0	0	4	0	1
30	DF	(Algeria) Mohamed Rabie Meftah	3	0	0	0	0	0	4	0	0	7	0	0
26	DF	(Algeria) Brahim Boudebouda	2	0	0	0	0	0	0	0	0	2	0	0
5	DF	(Algeria) Arslane Mazari	3	0	0	0	0	0	0	0	0	3	0	0
19	DF	(Algeria) Houcine Benayada	1	0	0	0	0	0	1	0	0	2	0	0
20	DF	(Algeria) Nacereddine Khoualed	4	0	0	1	0	0	2	0	0	7	0	0
25	DF	(Algeria) Mokhtar Benmoussa	3	0	0	0	0	0	0	0	0	3	0	0
7	MF	(Algeria) Zinedine Ferhat	0	0	0	0	0	0	3	1	0	3	1	0
23	MF	(Algeria) Hamza Koudri	8	0	0	0	0	0	2	0	0	10	0	0
28	MF	(Algeria) Karim Baïteche	1	0	0	0	0	0	1	0	0	2	0	0
8	MF	(Algeria) Kaddour Beldjilali	3	0	0	0	0	0	0	0	0	3	0	0
24	MF	(Algeria) Mohammed Benkhemassa	8	0	0	0	0	0	2	0	0	10	0	0
11	MF	(Algeria) Hocine El Orfi	1	0	0	0	0	0	2	0	1	3	0	1
22	FW	(Algeria) Oussama Darfalou	1	0	0	0	0	0	0	0	0	1	0	0
18	FW	(Algeria) Mohamed Seguer	3	0	0	0	0	0	1	0	0	4	0	0
14	FW	(Algeria) Rachid Nadji	2	0	0	0	0	0	0	0	0	2	0	0
9	FW	(Madagascar) Carolus Andriamatsinoro	3	0	0	0	0	0	2	0	0	5	0	0
Total			56	0	1	1	0	0	22	1	1	79	1	2

=== Goalscorers ===
Includes all competitive matches.

No.	Nat.	Player	Pos.	L 1	AC	CL 1	TOTAL
18	(Algeria)	Mohamed Seguer	FW	9	0	3	12
30	(Algeria)	Mohamed Meftah	DF	8	0	1	9
14	(Algeria)	Rachid Nadji	FW	7	0	0	7
10	(Algeria)	Youcef Belaïli	MF	3	0	2	5
22	(Algeria)	Oussama Darfalou	FW	4	0	0	4
9	(Madagascar)	Carolus Andriamatsinoro	FW	4	0	0	4
21	(Algeria)	Mohamed Amine Aoudia	FW	2	0	2	4
26	(Algeria)	Brahim Boudebouda	DF	3	0	0	3
6	(Algeria)	Farouk Chafaï	DF	3	0	0	3
25	(Algeria)	Mokhtar Benmoussa	DF	3	0	0	3
8	(Algeria)	Kaddour Beldjilali	MF	0	0	2	2
20	(Algeria)	Nacereddine Khoualed	DF	1	0	1	2
28	(Algeria)	Karim Baïteche	MF	1	0	1	2
88	(Algeria)	Oualid Ardji	MF	1	1	0	2
Own Goals				0	0	0	0
Totals				49	1	12	62

=== Suspensions ===
Date Incurred	Nation	Name	Games Missed	Reason
3 May 2015	(Algeria)	Mohamed Lamine Zemmamouche	1	Yellow card
23 May 2015	(Algeria)	Zinedine Ferhat	2	(red card) (vs. ASM Oran)
27 June 2015	(Algeria)	Zinedine Ferhat	1	Yellow card
10 July 2015	(Algeria)	Hamza Koudri	2	Yellow card
24 July 2015	(Algeria)	Nacereddine Khoualed	1	Yellow card
7 August 2015	(Algeria)	Mohamed Meftah	2	Yellow card
7 August 2015	(Algeria)	Hocine El Orfi	1	Yellow card
15 August 2015	(Algeria)	Farouk Chafaï	2	(red card) (vs. NA Hussein Dey)
15 August 2015	(Algeria)	Mohamed Lamine Zemmamouche	1	Yellow card
21 August 2015	(Algeria)	Mohammed Benkhemassa	1	Yellow card
11 September 2015	(Algeria)	Ayoub Abdellaoui	1	Yellow card
4 October 2015	(Algeria)	Mohamed Meftah	2	Yellow card
4 October 2015	(Madagascar)	Carolus Andriamatsinoro	1	Yellow card
31 October 2015	(Algeria)	Hocine El Orfi	1	(red card) (vs. TP Mazembe)
31 October 2015	(Algeria)	Nacereddine Khoualed	1	Yellow card
24 November 2015	(Madagascar)	Carolus Andriamatsinoro	1	Yellow card
28 November 2015	(Algeria)	Mohamed Seguer	1	Yellow card
12 December 2015	(Algeria)	Mokhtar Benmoussa	1	Yellow card
12 December 2015	(Algeria)	Hamza Koudri	1	Yellow card
18 March 2016	(Algeria)	Mohamed Meftah	1	Yellow card

==== Clean sheets ====
Includes all competitive matches.

No.	Nat	Name	L 1	AC	CL 1	Total
1	(Algeria)	Lamine Zemmamouche	2	–	4	6
16	(Algeria)	Ismaïl Mansouri	6	–	0	6
27	(Algeria)	Mourad Berrefane	2	0	–	2
		TOTALS	10	0	4	14

=== Overall seasonal record ===
Note: Games which are level after extra-time and are decided by a penalty shoot-out are listed as draws.

Games played	41 (30 Ligue 1, 1 Algerian Cup, 10 Champions League)
Games won	23 (17 Ligue 1, 0 Algerian Cup, 6 Champions League)
Games drawn	8 (7 Ligue 1, 0 Algerian Cup, 1 Champions League)
Games lost	10 (6 Ligue 1, 1 Algerian Cup, 3 Champions League)
Win %	56.10%
Goals scored	62 (49 Ligue 1, 1 Algerian Cup, 12 Champions League)
Goals conceded	42 (31 Ligue 1, 3 Algerian Cup, 8 Champions League)
Goal difference	+20 (+18 Ligue 1, −2 Algerian Cup, +4 Champions League)
Yellow cards	79 (58 Ligue 1, 1 Algerian Cup, 22 Champions League)
Red cards	3 (1 Ligue 1, 0 Algerian Cup, 2 Champions League)
Worst discipline	
Biggest win	4-0 (vs. RC Arbaâ, Algerian Ligue Professionnelle 1, 12.03.2016)
Heaviest defeat	0-3 (on 2 occasions)
Highest scoring match	3-2 (vs. MC Oran, Algerian Ligue Professionnelle 1, 15.09.2015); 3-2 (vs. MO Béjaïa, Algerian Ligue Professionnelle 1, 12.10.2015)
Most appearances	33 (Mokhtar Benmoussa, Hamza Koudri)
Top scorer	12 (Mohamed Seguer)
Most assists	11 (Zinedine Ferhat)
