= 2015 CAF Champions League final =

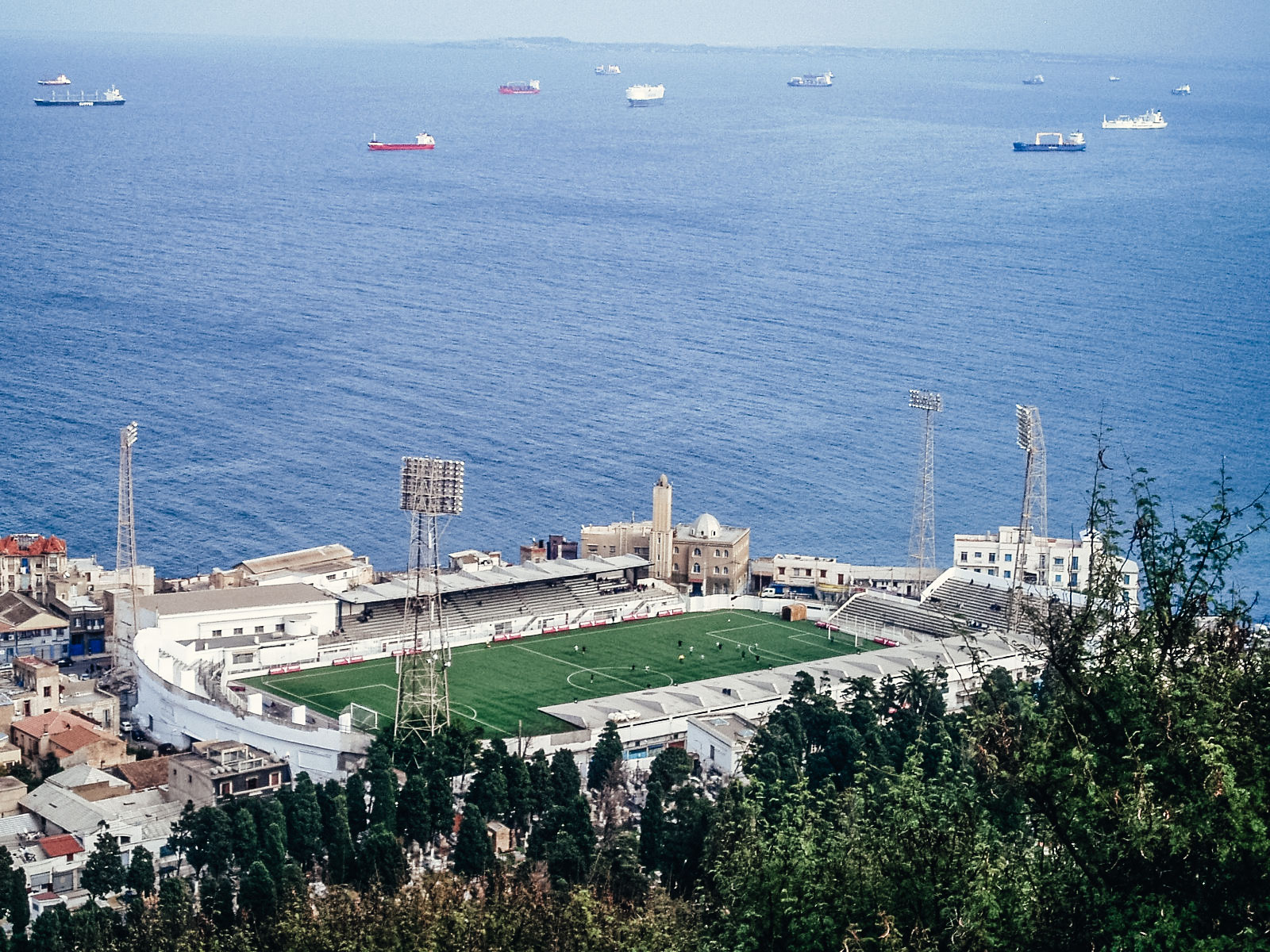
- Stade Omar Hamadi in Algiers hosted the first leg of the final
- Event: 2015 CAF Champions League
USM Alger	TP Mazembe
(Algeria)	(Democratic Republic of the Congo)
1	4
- on aggregate

First leg
USM Alger	TP Mazembe
1	2
- Date: 31 October 2015
- Venue: Omar Hamadi Stadium, Algiers
- Referee: Gehad Grisha (Egypt)

Second leg
TP Mazembe	USM Alger
2	0
- Date: 8 November 2015
- Venue: Stade TP Mazembe, Lubumbashi
- Referee: Bakary Gassama (Gambia)

The 2015 CAF Champions League final was the final of the 2015 CAF Champions League, the 51st edition of Africa's premier club football tournament organized by the Confederation of African Football (CAF), and the 19th edition under the current CAF Champions League format.

The final was contested in two-legged home-and-away format between USM Alger of Algeria and TP Mazembe of Democratic Republic of the Congo. The first leg was hosted by USM Alger at the Omar Hamadi Stadium in Algiers on 31 October 2015, while the second leg was hosted by TP Mazembe at the Stade TP Mazembe in Lubumbashi on 8 November 2015. The winner earned the right to represent the CAF at the 2015 FIFA Club World Cup, entering at the quarterfinal stage, as well as play in the 2016 CAF Super Cup against the winner of the 2015 CAF Confederation Cup.

TP Mazembe won the competition for the fifth time in its history and first time since 2010, defeating USM Alger of Algeria 4–1 on aggregate.

== Qualified teams ==
In the following table, finals until 1996 were in the African Cup of Champions Club era, since 1997 were in the CAF Champions League era.

Team	Region	Previous finals appearances (bold indicates winners)
(Algeria) USM Alger	UNAF (North Africa)	none
(Democratic Republic of the Congo) TP Mazembe	UNIFFAC (Central Africa)	**1967**, **1968**, 1969, 1970, **2009**, **2010**

== Venues ==
=== Omar Hamadi Stadium ===
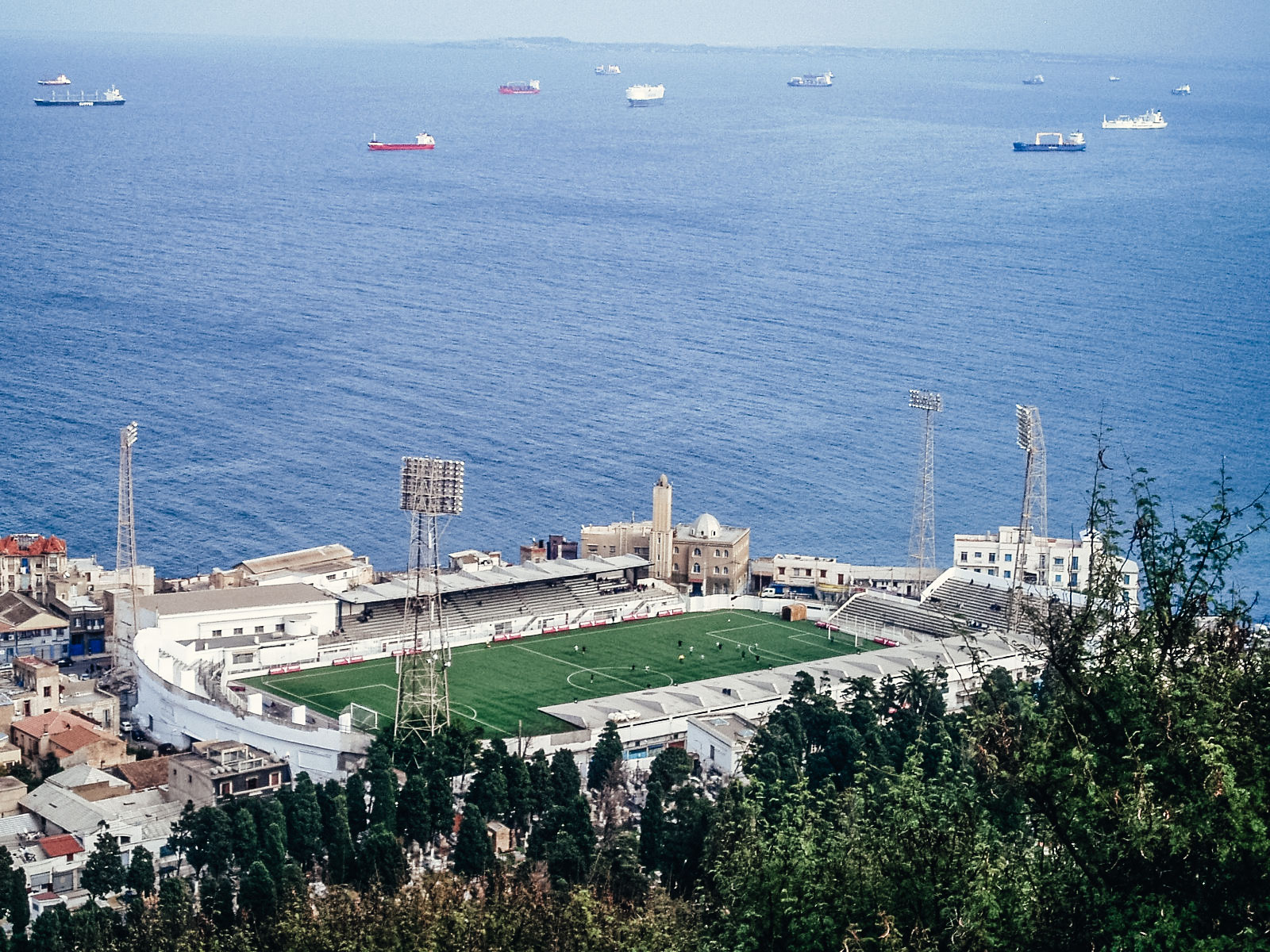
Omar Hamadi Stadium in Algiers, Algeria, hosted the first leg.

Omar Hammadi Stadium is a multi-purpose stadium in Bologhine, Algiers, Algeria. It is currently used mostly for football matches and is the home ground of USM Alger. The stadium has a capacity of 17,000 people.

The stadium was built in 1919 as the home ground for l’Association Sportive Saint Eugénoise. It was known as the Stade communal de Saint Eugène.

In 1957, the third platform will be built, consisting of two superimposed stands on the south side, arched and connecting the two original stands, this new platform will give a modern look at the municipal stadium.

After the independence of Algeria in 1962, the stage of St. Eugene will be called Bologhine new name for the town.

In 2000 a new stand was built to expand the home stadium capacity, and spent 8,000 to 10,000 spectators, USM Alger club that holds the concession for the stadium has also invested in the development of infrastructure necessary for recovery and training for players: sauna, gym and restaurant.

=== Stade TP Mazembe ===
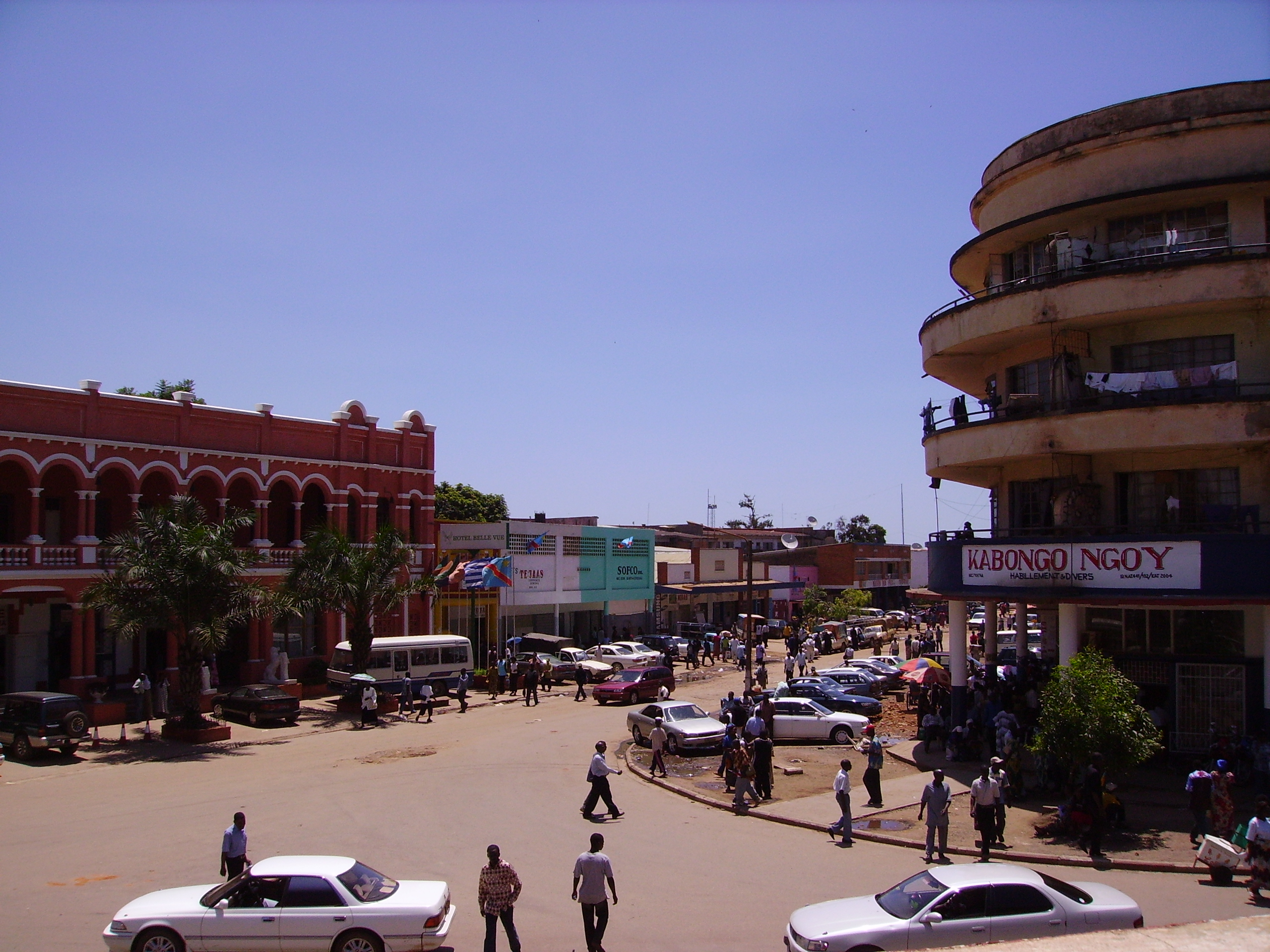
Lubumbashi, DR Congo hosted the second leg.

Stade TP Mazembe is a multi-use stadium located in the Kamalondo suburb of Lubumbashi, Democratic Republic of the Congo. Since its completion in 2011, it has mostly been used for football matches and is the home venue of TP Mazembe and CS Don Bosco. The stadium has 18,000 seats.

In April 2010 the construction of the new stadium of the TP Mazembe Lubumbashi club began, an enclosure that will meet the standards required by the African Football Confederation (CAF) to host international competitions, the new facilities have a VIP press room, parking for vehicles and synthetic grass.

Until 2011 the TP Mazembe made use of the Stade Frederic Kibassa Maliba.

== Road to final ==
Note: In all results below, the score of the finalist is given first (H: home; A: away).

(Democratic Republic of the Congo) TP Mazembe				Round	(Algeria) USM Alger			
Opponent	Agg.	1st leg	2nd leg	Qualifying rounds	Opponent	Agg.	1st leg	2nd leg
Bye				Preliminary round	(Chad) Foullah Edifice	4–3	3–0 (H)	1–3 (A)
(South Africa) Mamelodi Sundowns	3–2	0–1 (A)	3–1 (H)	First round	(Senegal) AS Pikine	6–2	5–1 (H)	1–1 (A)
(Mali) Stade Malien	4–3	2–2 (A)	2–1 (H)	Second round	(Guinea) AS Kaloum	3–2	2–1 (H)	1–1 (A)
Opponent	Result			Group stage	Opponent	Result		
(Sudan) Al-Hilal	0–0 (H)			Matchday 1	(Algeria) ES Sétif	2–1 (A)		
(Morocco) Moghreb Tétouan	0–0 (A)			Matchday 2	(Sudan) Al-Merrikh	1–0 (H)		
(Egypt) Smouha	2–0 (A)			Matchday 3	(Algeria) MC El Eulma	2–1 (H)		
(Egypt) Smouha	1–0 (H)			Matchday 4	(Algeria) MC El Eulma	1–0 (A)		
(Sudan) Al-Hilal	0–1 (A)			Matchday 5	(Algeria) ES Sétif	3–0 (H)		
(Morocco) Moghreb Tétouan	5–0 (H)			Matchday 6	(Sudan) Al-Merrikh	0–1 (A)		
**Group A winner**: Pos / Team / Pld / W / D / L / Pts / Qualification; **1** / (Democratic Republic of the Congo) TP Mazembe / **6** / **3** / **2** / **1** / **11** / **Advance to knockout stage**; 2 / (Sudan) Al-Hilal / 6 / 2 / 3 / 1 / **9** / **Advance to knockout stage**; 3 / (Morocco) Moghreb Tétouan / 6 / 2 / 2 / 2 / **8**; 4 / (Egypt) Smouha / 6 / 1 / 1 / 4 / **4**; Source: CAF				Final standings	**Group B winner**: Pos / Team / Pld / W / D / L / Pts / Qualification; **1** / (Algeria) USM Alger / **6** / **5** / **0** / **1** / **15** / **Advance to knockout stage**; 2 / (Sudan) Al-Merrikh / 6 / 4 / 1 / 1 / **13** / **Advance to knockout stage**; 3 / (Algeria) ES Sétif / 6 / 1 / 2 / 3 / **5**; 4 / (Algeria) MC El Eulma / 6 / 0 / 1 / 5 / **1**; Source: CAF			
Opponent	Agg.	1st leg	2nd leg	Knockout stage	Opponent	Agg.	1st leg	2nd leg
(Sudan) Al-Merrikh	4–2	1–2 (A)	3–0 (H)	Semifinals	(Sudan) Al-Hilal	2–1	2–1 (A)	0–0 (H)

== Format ==
The final was played on a home-and-away two-legged basis, with the order of legs decided by a draw, held after the group stage draw. If the aggregate score was tied after the second leg, the away goals rule would be applied, and if still level, the penalty shoot-out would be used to determine the winner (no extra time would be played).

== Matches ==
=== First leg ===
31 October 2015
20:30 UTC+1

USM Alger (Algeria)	1–2	(Democratic Republic of the Congo) TP Mazembe
Seguer 89'	Report	Kalaba 28'; Samatta 79' (pen.)

Stade Omar Hamadi, Algiers
Attendance: 15.000
Referee: Gehad Grisha (Egypt)

**USM Alger**	**TP Mazembe**

GK	1	(Algeria) Lamine Zemmamouche
DF	25	(Algeria) Mokhtar Benmoussa
DF	26	(Algeria) Brahim Boudebouda
DF	5	(Algeria) Arslane Mazari		(substituted off) 51'
DF	19	(Algeria) Houcine Benayada		(substituted off) 70'
MF	23	(Algeria) Hamza Koudri
MF	20	(Algeria) Nacereddine Khoualed (c)	(yellow card) 77'
MF	11	(Algeria) Hocine El Orfi	(yellow card) 22' (yellow-red card) 67'
MF	7	(Algeria) Zinedine Ferhat
MF	8	(Algeria) Kaddour Beldjilali		(substituted off) 46'
FW	14	(Algeria) Rachid Nadji
Substitutes:
FW	18	(Algeria) Mohamed Seguer		(substituted on) 46'
DF	6	(Algeria) Farouk Chafaï		(substituted on) 51'
FW	2	(Algeria) Amine Aoudia		(substituted on) 70'
DF	3	(Algeria) Ayoub Abdellaoui
MF	13	(Algeria) Nassim Bouchema
MF	28	(Algeria) Karim Baïteche
GK	29	(Algeria) Ismaïl Mansouri
Manager:
(France) Miloud Hamdi

GK	1	(Democratic Republic of the Congo) Robert Kidiaba
DF	24	(Ghana) Yaw Frimpong
DF	2	(Democratic Republic of the Congo) Joël Kimwaki (c)	(yellow card) 69'
DF	27	(Ghana) Richard Kissi Boateng
DF	6	(Mali) Salif Coulibaly
MF	4	(Zambia) Nathan Sinkala	(yellow card) 15'	(substituted off) 72'
MF	29	(Mali) Boubacar Diarra
MF	18	(Zambia) Rainford Kalaba	(red card) 45+1'
FW	9	(Tanzania) Mbwana Samatta		(substituted off) 86'
FW	28	(Tanzania) Thomas Ulimwengu		(substituted off) 90+1'
FW	11	(Mali) Adama Traoré
Substitutes:
DF	12	(Democratic Republic of the Congo) Merveille Bokadi		(substituted on) 72'
FW	7	(Ivory Coast) Roger Assalé		(substituted on) 86'
MF	19	(Ghana) Daniel Nii Adjei		(substituted on) 90+1'
DF	3	(Democratic Republic of the Congo) Jean Kasusula
FW	17	(Democratic Republic of the Congo) Jonathan Bolingi
FW	20	(Ghana) Solomon Asante
GK	22	(Ivory Coast) Sylvain Gbohouo
Manager:
(France) Patrice Carteron

Assistant referees:
Tahssen Abo El Sadat Bedyer (Egypt)
Ahmed Taha Hossam (Egypt)
Fourth official:
Ibrahim Nour El Din (Egypt)

=== Second leg ===
8 November 2015
15:30 UTC+2

TP Mazembe (Democratic Republic of the Congo)	2–0	(Algeria) USM Alger
Samatta 74' (pen.); Assalé 90+3'	Report

Stade TP Mazembe, Lubumbashi
Attendance: 18,000
Referee: Bakary Gassama (Gambia)

**TP Mazembe**	**USM Alger**

GK	1	(Democratic Republic of the Congo) Robert Kidiaba
DF	24	(Ghana) Yaw Frimpong
DF	2	(Democratic Republic of the Congo) Joël Kimwaki (c)
DF	27	(Ghana) Richard Kissi Boateng
DF	6	(Mali) Salif Coulibaly
MF	20	(Ghana) Solomon Asante		(substituted off) 46'
MF	4	(Zambia) Nathan Sinkala		(substituted off) 46'
MF	29	(Mali) Boubacar Diarra
FW	9	(Tanzania) Mbwana Samatta
FW	28	(Tanzania) Thomas Ulimwengu	(yellow card) 70'	(substituted off) 77'
FW	11	(Mali) Adama Traoré
Substitutes:
FW	7	(Ivory Coast) Roger Assalé		(substituted on) 46'
MF	19	(Ghana) Daniel Nii Adjei		(substituted on) 46'
FW	17	(Democratic Republic of the Congo) Jonathan Bolingi		(substituted on) 77'
FW	10	(Zambia) Given Singuluma
DF	12	(Democratic Republic of the Congo) Merveille Bokadi
DF	14	(Zambia) Kabaso Chongo
GK	22	(Ivory Coast) Sylvain Gbohouo
Manager:
(France) Patrice Carteron

GK	16	(Algeria) Ismaïl Mansouri
DF	19	(Algeria) Houcine Benayada	(yellow card) 2'
DF	25	(Algeria) Mokhtar Benmoussa
DF	26	(Algeria) Brahim Boudebouda
DF	6	(Algeria) Farouk Chafaï
DF	3	(Algeria) Ayoub Abdellaoui
MF	24	(Algeria) Mohamed Benkhemassa
MF	23	(Algeria) Hamza Koudri
MF	7	(Algeria) Zinedine Ferhat	(yellow card) 73' (yellow-red card) 90+5'
FW	2	(Algeria) Amine Aoudia		(substituted off) 46'
FW	9	(Madagascar) Carolus Andriamatsinoro
Substitutes:
MF	8	(Algeria) Kaddour Beldjilali		(substituted on) 46'
GK	1	(Algeria) Lamine Zemmamouche
MF	13	(Algeria) Nassim Bouchema
FW	14	(Algeria) Rachid Nadji
FW	18	(Algeria) Mohamed Seguer
GK	27	(Algeria) Mourad Berrefane
MF	28	(Algeria) Karim Baïteche
Manager:
(France) Miloud Hamdi

Assistant referees:
Jean Claude Birumushahu (Burundi)
Yahaya Mahamadou (Niger)
Fourth official:
Bakary Camara (Gambia)
