= 2015 CAF Champions League knockout stage =

The 2015 CAF Champions League knockout stage was played from 26 September to 8 November 2015. A total of four teams competed in the knockout stage to decide the champions of the 2015 CAF Champions League.

== Qualified teams ==
The winners and runners-up of each of the two groups in the group stage qualified for the knockout stage.

Group	Winners	Runners-up
A	(Democratic Republic of the Congo) TP Mazembe	(Sudan) Al-Hilal
B	(Algeria) USM Alger	(Sudan) Al-Merrikh

== Format ==
Knockout ties were played on a home-and-away two-legged basis. If the aggregate score was tied after the second leg, the away goals rule would be applied, and if still level, the penalty shoot-out would be used to determine the winner (no extra time would be played).

== Schedule ==
The schedule of each round was as follows.

Round	First leg	Second leg
Semi-finals	25–27 September 2015	2–4 October 2015
Final	30 October–1 November 2015	6–8 November 2015

== Bracket ==
In the semi-finals, the group A winners played the group B runners-up, and the group B winners played the group A runners-up, with the group winners hosting the second leg.

In the final, the order of legs was determined by a draw, held after the group stage draw (5 May 2015, 11:00 UTC+2, at the CAF headquarters in Cairo, Egypt).

Semi-finals
1	(Sudan) Al-Hilal	1	0	1
4	(Algeria) USM Alger	2	0	2
3	(Sudan) Al-Merrikh	2	0	2
2	(Democratic Republic of the Congo) TP Mazembe	1	3	4

Final
(Algeria) USM Alger	1	0	1
(Democratic Republic of the Congo) TP Mazembe	2	2	4

== Semi-finals ==
Team 1	Agg.	Team 2	1st leg	2nd leg
Al-Merrikh (Sudan)	2–4	(Democratic Republic of the Congo) TP Mazembe	2–1	0–3
Al-Hilal (Sudan)	1–2	(Algeria) USM Alger	1–2	0–0

26 September 2015
21:00 UTC+3

Al-Merrikh (Sudan)	2–1	(Democratic Republic of the Congo) TP Mazembe
Coffie 41'; Al-Madina 81'	Report	Ulimwengu 77'

Al-Merrikh Stadium, Omdurman
Referee: Néant Alioum (Cameroon)
4 October 2015
15:30 UTC+2

TP Mazembe (Democratic Republic of the Congo)	3–0	(Sudan) Al-Merrikh
Samatta 52'; Omer 70' (o.g.); Assalé 71'	Report

Stade TP Mazembe, Lubumbashi
Referee: Eric Otogo-Castane (Gabon)

TP Mazembe won 4–2 on aggregate.

27 September 2015
20:00 UTC+3

Al-Hilal (Sudan)	1–2	(Algeria) USM Alger
Careca 2'	Report	Aoudia 13'; Baïteche 73'

Al-Hilal Stadium, Omdurman
Referee: Janny Sikazwe (Zambia)
3 October 2015
21:30 UTC+1

USM Alger (Algeria)	0–0	(Sudan) Al-Hilal
	Report

Stade Omar Hamadi, Algiers
Referee: Victor Gomes (South Africa)

USM Alger won 2–1 on aggregate.

== Final ==
Team 1	Agg.	Team 2	1st leg	2nd leg
USM Alger (Algeria)	1–4	(Democratic Republic of the Congo) TP Mazembe	1–2	0–2

31 October 2015
20:30 UTC+1

USM Alger (Algeria)	1–2	(Democratic Republic of the Congo) TP Mazembe
Seguer 89'	Report	Kalaba 28'; Samatta 79' (pen.)

Stade Omar Hamadi, Algiers
Referee: Gehad Grisha (Egypt)
8 November 2015
15:30 UTC+2

TP Mazembe (Democratic Republic of the Congo)	2–0	(Algeria) USM Alger
Samatta 74' (pen.); Assalé 90+3'	Report

Stade TP Mazembe, Lubumbashi
Referee: Bakary Gassama (Gambia)

TP Mazembe won 4–1 on aggregate.
