= Carolus Andriamatsinoro =

Malagasy footballer

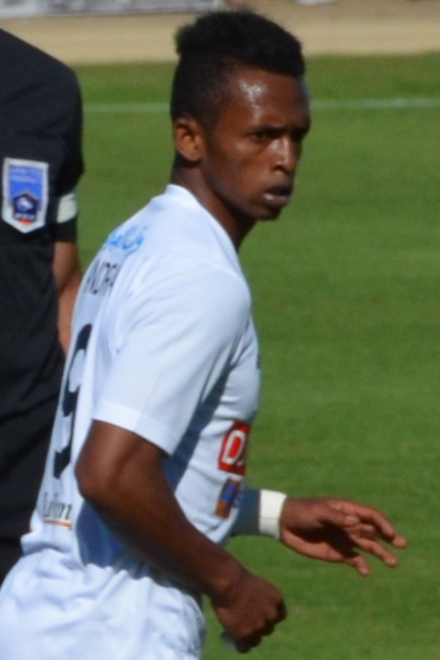
- Andriamatsinoro playing for USM Alger in 2016

Personal information
- Full name: Charles Carolus Andriamatsinoro
- Date of birth: 6 July 1989 (age 37)
- Place of birth: Mahajanga, Madagascar
- Height: 1.72 m (5 ft 8 in)
- Position: Forward

Team information
- Current team: Al-Ain (KSA)
- Number: 92

Youth career
- 2003–2005: Académie Ny Antsika

Senior career*
Years	Team	Apps	(Gls)
2005–2011	Académie Ny Antsika		
2011–2012	Paradou AC	0	(0)
2011–2012	→ WA Tlemcen (loan)	32	(12)
2012–2017	USM Alger	97	(14)
2017–2018	Ohod	10	(1)
2018–2021	Al-Adalah	63	(32)
2020–2021	→ Al-Qadsiah (loan)	28	(7)
2021–2022	Ohod	34	(25)
2022	Kuwait SC	0	(0)
2022–2023	Najran	22	(4)
2023–2024	Al-Kawkab	29	(18)
2024–2025	Al-Rawdhah		
2025–2026	Al-Sadd (KSA)		
2026–	Al-Ain (KSA)		

International career^{‡}
2009–	Madagascar	49	(12)
- * Club domestic league appearances and goals as of 3 September 2024 ‡ National team caps and goals as of 9 September 2024

Charles Carolus Andriamatsinoro (born 6 July 1989), simply known as Andria, is a Malagasy professional footballer who plays as a forward for Saudi club Al-Ain and the Madagascar national team.

== Club career ==
=== WA Tlemcen ===
On 31 January 2011, Carolus signed for Algerian club WA Tlemcen. On 19 March 2011, he made his debut for the club in a 1–1 away draw USM Annaba, scoring his first goal for the club in the 90th minute of the game. On 18 February 2012, he scored his first hat-trick for the club in a 4–2 home win against MC Oran, his first, a shot from the edge of the penalty box in the 10th minute, his second, heading in from close range in the 78th minute, and his third, receiving the ball in the opposition half, dribbling past three defenders and finishing past the keeper in the 90th minute. He finished with 10 goals in 22 appearances in the second season at the club.

=== USM Alger ===
On 28 May 2012, Carolus signed for Algerian club USM Alger. On 16 April 2014, he made his league debut in a 1–0 away defeat to ASO Chlef, coming in at the 55th minute after being subbed on for Mohamed Seguer. In his first season at the club, he missed 9 months due to a serious injury to the knee, and until the end of the season, was only able to play in 6 matches, including the final of the 2013 Algerian Cup and the 2013 UAFA Club Cup, winning both of them in his debut season. On 24 August 2013, in his second season, he scored his first goal for the club in a 4–1 home win against MO Béjaïa. After being subbed in at the 66th minute mark for Lamouri Djediat, in the 68th minute, he received a pass from Hamza Koudri and finished low in the left corner to make it 2–0 in favour of USMA, four minutes later, he scored his second for the club after beating keeper Mourad Berrefane in a one-on-one situation. On 11 January 2014, he scored in a 2–0 win against ES Sétif in the 2013 Algerian Super Cup, scoring in the 40th minute, after Farès Benabderahmane had made a defensive mistake, seconds earlier. He eventually won the 2013–14 Ligue 1 title and also finished as USMA's top scorer of the season with six goals, along with Ahmed Gasmi and Abdelmalek Ziaya.

In the 2014–15 season, Carolus signed a new deal which would keep him at the club for two more seasons. On 15 February 2015, he made his CAF Champions League debut in a 3–0 home win against Foullah Edifice in the 2015 CAF Champions League preliminary round, also scoring his debut goal in the competition in the same game. He scored his second goal in the competition in a 1–1 away draw against Guinean club AS Kaloum and helped USMA qualify for the 2015 CAF Champions League group stage. On 10 July 2015, he made his CAF Champions League group stage debut in a 1–0 home win against Sudanese side Al-Merrikh. USMA eventually reached the final of the competition for the first time in the history, where they faced Congolese side TP Mazembe. Carolus missed the first leg due to suspension, but was part of the squad in the second leg, as USMA lost 4–1 on aggregate to finish runners-up.

"Thank you so much to everyone for having supported me during these last five years at L'USMA, It's been a very big pleasure to defend the colours [and] I've spent some great memories here with you.

— A message of thanks and farewell from Andria on Facebook.

Next season, he scored four league goals and won his second Ligue 1 title. On 12 May 2017, he scored his first CAF Champions League group stage goal in a 3–0 home win against Libyan side Al-Ahli Tripoli. He scored his last goal for the club in a 2–1 home win against MC Oran. Carlous left the club in 2017, after his contract was expired. He finished his USMA career with 20 goals in 132 games and won six titles in the process.

=== Ohod Club ===
On 12 August 2017, Carolus made his Ohod debut in a 2–1 away win against Al-Shabab. On 7 September 2017, Carolus scored his first goal for the club in a 1–1 penalty loss to Al-Fateh in the 2017–18 Saudi Crown Prince Cup round of 16. On 19 October 2017, he scored his first league goal for the club in a 2–2 home draw against Al-Nassr. Carolus scored one goal in 10 league appearances and joined Al-Adalah in June 2018.

On 5 August 2021, Carolus returned to Ohod on a one-year contract.

=== Kuwait ===
On 7 July 2022, Carolus joined Kuwaiti club Kuwait SC. On 22 August 2022, Carolus was released from his contract.

=== Najran ===
On 31 August 2022, Carolus joined Najran.

=== Al-Kawkab ===
On 26 August 2023, Carolus joined Al-Kawkab.

=== Al-Rawdhah ===
On 7 September 2024, Carolus joined Al-Rawdhah.

=== Al-Sadd ===
On 3 October 2025, Carolus joined Al-Sadd.

== International career ==
In March 2011, Carolus was part of the Madagascar U23s who participated in the 2011 CAF U-23 Championship qualification. Madagascar lost 4–0 on aggregate to Algeria in the first qualifying round and were not able to qualify for the finals.

On 12 July 2009, Carolus made his national team debut in a 2–2 friendly draw against Mayotte. On 19 July 2009, he played his first match against a FIFA nation in a 1–0 friendly loss against South Africa. On 18 May 2014, he scored his first ever senior international goal in a 2–1 win against Uganda in the 2015 Africa Cup of Nations first qualifying round.

On 12 June 2019, he was named in Madagascar's 23-man squad for the 2019 Africa Cup of Nations in Egypt. On 22 June 2019, at the 55th minute mark, in the opening match against Guinea, Carolus ran on to a long ball and shot past Aly Keita to score Madagascar's second ever goal in the Africa Cup of Nations. The match subsequently ended in a 2–2 draw. On 30 June 2019, he scored in a 2–0 win against Nigeria, shooting in the 53rd minute from a free kick, the ball took a huge deflection off Wilfred Ndidi and ended in the top right corner of the goal. Madagascar thus qualified for the round of 16, after they topped the group ahead of Nigeria.

== Personal life ==
In 2013, Carolus converted to Islam and married an Algerian, with whom he has one son. He also holds Algerian nationality.

== Career statistics ==
=== Club ===
As of 3 September 2024

Club	Season	League			Cup (Note: Includes the Kings Cup and Algerian Cup)		League Cup (Note: Includes the Saudi Crown Prince Cup)		Continental		Other		Total	
Club	Season	Division	Apps	Goals	Apps	Goals	Apps	Goals	Apps	Goals	Apps	Goals	Apps	Goals
WA Tlemcen	2010–11	Ligue 1	10	2	0	0	—		—		—		10	2
WA Tlemcen	2011–12	Ligue 1	22	10	4	4	—		—		—		26	14
WA Tlemcen	Total		32	12	4	4	—		—		—		36	16
USM Alger	2012–13	Ligue 1	3	0	1	0	—		0 (Note: All appearance(s) in CAF Confederation Cup)	0	2 (Note: All appearance(s) in UAFA Club Cup)	0	6	0
USM Alger	2013–14	Ligue 1	21	5	2	0	—		—		1 (Note: All appearances in Algerian Super Cup)	1	24	6
USM Alger	2014–15	Ligue 1	28	1	3	2	—		6 (Note: All appearance(s) in CAF Champions League)	1	1	0	38	5
USM Alger	2015–16	Ligue 1	24	4	1	0	—		7	0	—		32	4
USM Alger	2016–17	Ligue 1	21	4	3	0	—		7	1	1	0	32	5
USM Alger	Total		97	14	10	2	—		20	3	5	1	132	20
Ohod	2017–18	SPL	10	1	0	0	1	1	—		—		11	2
Ohod	Total		10	1	0	0	1	1	—		—		11	2
Al-Adalah	2018–19	MS League	33	22	1	0	—		—		—		34	22
Al-Adalah	2019–20	SPL	30	10	4	8	—		—		—		34	18
Al-Adalah	Total		63	32	5	8	—		—		—		68	40
Al-Qadsiah	2020–21	SPL	28	7	2	0	—		—		—		30	7
Al-Qadsiah	Total		28	7	2	0	—		—		—		30	7
Ohod	2021–22	SFDL	32	25	0	0	0	0	—		—		32	25
Ohod	Total		32	25	0	0	0	0	—		—		32	25
Najran	2022–23	SFDL	22	4	0	0	0	0	—		—		22	4
Najran	Total		22	4	0	0	0	0	—		—		22	4
Al-Kawkab	2023–24	SSDL	29	18	0	0	0	0	—		—		29	18
Al-Kawkab	Total		29	18	0	0	0	0	—		—		29	18
Career total			313	113	21	14	1	1	20	3	5	1	360	132

=== International ===
As of 9 September 2024

National team	Year	Apps	Goals
Madagascar	2009	2	0
Madagascar	2010	2	0
Madagascar	2011	1	0
Madagascar	2012	1	0
Madagascar	2014	2	1
Madagascar	2015	6	0
Madagascar	2016	3	1
Madagascar	2017	5	4
Madagascar	2018	4	1
Madagascar	2019	11	4
Madagascar	2020	2	0
Madagascar	2021	5	0
Madagascar	2023	1	0
Madagascar	2024	4	1
Total		49	12

=== International goals ===
As of 12 July 2019
Scores and results list Madagascar's goal tally first.

No	Date	Venue	Opponent	Score	Result	Competition
1.	18 May 2014	Rabemananjara Stadium, Mahajanga, Madagascar	Uganda	2–0	2–1	2015 Africa Cup of Nations qualification
2.	26 March 2016	Mahamasina Municipal Stadium, Antananarivo, Madagascar	Central African Republic	1–0	1–1	2017 Africa Cup of Nations qualification
3.	26 March 2017	Mahamasina Municipal Stadium, Antananarivo, Madagascar	São Tomé and Príncipe	3–1	3–2	2019 Africa Cup of Nations qualification
4.	9 June 2017	Al-Ubayyid Stadium, Al-Ubayyid, Sudan	Sudan	2–0	3–1	2019 Africa Cup of Nations qualification
5.	4 October 2017	Lugogo Stadium, Kampala, Uganda	Uganda	1–1	2–1	Friendly
6.	4 October 2017	Lugogo Stadium, Kampala, Uganda	Uganda	2–1	2–1	Friendly
7.	18 November 2018	Vontovorona Stadium, Antananarivo, Madagascar	Sudan	1–2	1–3	2019 Africa Cup of Nations qualification
8.	2 June 2019	Stade Josy Barthel, Luxembourg City, Luxembourg	Luxembourg	3–1	3–3	Friendly
9.	22 June 2019	Alexandria Stadium, Alexandria, Egypt	Guinea	2–1	2–2	2019 Africa Cup of Nations
10.	30 June 2019	Alexandria Stadium, Alexandria, Egypt	Nigeria	2–0	2–0	2019 Africa Cup of Nations
11.	19 November 2019	Stade Général Seyni Kountché, Niamey, Niger	Niger	4–1	6–2	2021 Africa Cup of Nations qualification
12.	9 September 2024	Hammadi Agrebi Stadium, Tunis, Tunisia	Comoros	1–0	1–1	2025 Africa Cup of Nations qualification

== Honours ==
Academie Ny Antsika

- THB Champions League: 2008

USM Alger

- Algerian Ligue Professionnelle 1: 2013-14, 2015–16
- Algerian Cup: 2013
- Algerian Super Cup: 2013, 2016
- UAFA Club Cup: 2013
- CAF Champions League runner-up: 2015

Individual

- Best Player of the THB Champions League: 2009
- Top scorer THB Champions League: 2008, 2009, 2010
- Nominees shortlist for African Player of the Year based in Africa: 2015
- Man of the Match Nigeria group B : Africa Cup Of Nation 2019
- Group Stage best squad: Africa Cup Of Nation 2019
- Trophy OFC: revelation of Africa Cup Of Nation 2019
- Knight Order of Madagascar: 2019
- Best Player of the MS League: 2019
- Saudi First Division Golden Boot : 2018–19, 2021–22
- Top scorer 2019–20 King Cup: 2020
- Nominees shortlist for African Player of the year: 2019

Record

- First malagasy player nominated for the African Player of the Year based in Africa trophy
