= Richard Boateng =

Richard Boateng may refer to:

- Richard Kissi Boateng (born 1988), Ghanaian football left back
- Richard Boateng (footballer, born 1992), Ghanaian football midfielder
