= Champions League 2015 =

Champions League 2015 may refer to:

- 2015 AFC Champions League
- 2015 CAF Champions League
- 2014–15 UEFA Champions League
- 2015–16 UEFA Champions League
- 2014–15 CONCACAF Champions League
- 2015–16 CONCACAF Champions League
