= Jamal E Malinzi =

Jamal Malinzi

President of the Tanzania Football Federation
- In office 2013–2017
- Preceded by: Leodgar Tenga
- Succeeded by: Wallace Karia

Personal details
- Born: Kagera Region, Tanzania
- Occupation: Entrepreneur; Football administrator

Jamal Malinzi is a Tanzanian former football administrator. He was the president of the Tanzania Football Association (TFF) from 2013 until 2017.

Malinzi and Oden Mbaga are two sports executives football officials in Tanzania who are banned by FIFA Ethics Committee.
