= 2015 CAF Champions League group stage =

- Dates: 26 June – 12 September 2015

Tournament statistics
- Matches played: 24
- Goals scored: 52 (2.17 per match)

The 2015 CAF Champions League group stage was played from 26 June to 12 September 2015. A total of eight teams competed in the group stage to decide the four places in the knockout stage of the 2015 CAF Champions League.

== Draw ==
The draw for the group stage was held on 5 May 2015, 11:00 UTC+2, at the CAF headquarters in Cairo, Egypt. The eight winners of the second round were drawn into two groups of four. Each group contained one team from Pot 1, one team from Pot 2, and two teams from Pot 3. The seeding of each team was determined by their ranking points calculated based on performances in continental club championships for the period 2010–2014.

The following eight teams were entered into the draw:

Pot 1	Pot 2	Pot 3
(Democratic Republic of the Congo) TP Mazembe (41 pts); (Algeria) ES Sétif (31 pts)	(Sudan) Al-Hilal (24 pts); (Sudan) Al-Merrikh (6 pts)	(Algeria) MC El Eulma (0 pt); (Algeria) USM Alger (0 pt); (Egypt) Smouha (0 pt); (Morocco) Moghreb Tétouan (0 pt)

== Format ==
Each group was played on a home-and-away round-robin basis. The winners and runners-up of each group advanced to the semi-finals.

=== Tiebreakers ===
The teams were ranked according to points (3 points for a win, 1 point for a draw, 0 points for a loss). If tied on points, tiebreakers would be applied in the following order:

1. Number of points obtained in games between the teams concerned;
2. Goal difference in games between the teams concerned;
3. Goals scored in games between the teams concerned;
4. Away goals scored in games between the teams concerned;
5. If, after applying criteria 1 to 4 to several teams, two teams still have an equal ranking, criteria 1 to 4 are reapplied exclusively to the matches between the two teams in question to determine their final rankings. If this procedure does not lead to a decision, criteria 6 to 9 apply;
6. Goal difference in all games;
7. Goals scored in all games;
8. Away goals scored in all games;
9. Drawing of lots.

== Groups ==
The matchdays were 26–28 June, 10–12 July, 24–26 July, 7–9 August, 21–23 August, and 11–13 September 2015.

=== Group A ===
Pos	Team	Pld	W	D	L	GF	GA	GD	Pts	Qualification	TPM	HIL	MAT	SMO
1	(Democratic Republic of the Congo) TP Mazembe	6	3	2	1	8	1	+7	11	Advance to knockout stage	—	0–0	5–0	1–0
2	(Sudan) Al-Hilal	6	2	3	1	5	3	+2	9	Advance to knockout stage	1–0	—	0–1	2–0
3	(Morocco) Moghreb Tétouan	6	2	2	2	6	10	−4	8		0–0	1–1	—	2–1
4	(Egypt) Smouha	6	1	1	4	5	10	−5	4		0–2	1–1	3–2	—

Source: CAF
Rules for classification: Group stage tiebreakers
28 June 2015
15:30 UTC+2

TP Mazembe (Democratic Republic of the Congo)	0–0	(Sudan) Al-Hilal
	Report

Stade TP Mazembe, Lubumbashi
Referee: Victor Gomes (South Africa)
28 June 2015
21:15 UTC+2

Smouha (Egypt)	3–2	(Morocco) Moghreb Tétouan
Amin 66'; Kouao 78', 80'	Report	Fall 6'; Jahouh 11'

Alexandria Stadium, Alexandria
Referee: Youssef Essrayri (Tunisia)

12 July 2015
22:00 UTC+3

Al-Hilal (Sudan)	2–0	(Egypt) Smouha
El Shigail 46'; Hamid 82'	Report

Al-Hilal Stadium, Omdurman
Referee: Rédouane Jiyed (Morocco)
12 July 2015
22:00 UTC±0

Moghreb Tétouan (Morocco)	0–0	(Democratic Republic of the Congo) TP Mazembe
	Report

Stade Saniat Rmel, Tétouan
Referee: Joseph Lamptey (Ghana)

24 July 2015
19:30 UTC+2

Smouha (Egypt)	0–2	(Democratic Republic of the Congo) TP Mazembe
	Report	Kalaba 40'; Adjei 83'

Alexandria Stadium, Alexandria
Referee: Ali Lemghaifry (Mauritania)
26 July 2015
21:30 UTC+1

Moghreb Tétouan (Morocco)	1–1	(Sudan) Al-Hilal
Khadrouf 70'	Report	Andrezinho 77'

Stade Saniat Rmel, Tétouan
Referee: Mehdi Abid Charef (Algeria)

7 August 2015
21:15 UTC+3

Al-Hilal (Sudan)	0–1	(Morocco) Moghreb Tétouan
	Report	Jahouh 25' (pen.)

Al-Hilal Stadium, Omdurman
Referee: Néant Alioum (Cameroon)
8 August 2015
15:30 UTC+2

TP Mazembe (Democratic Republic of the Congo)	1–0	(Egypt) Smouha
Assalé 52'	Report

Stade TP Mazembe, Lubumbashi
Referee: Juste Ephrem Zio (Burkina Faso)

23 August 2015
20:00 UTC+3

Al-Hilal (Sudan)	1–0	(Democratic Republic of the Congo) TP Mazembe
El Tahir 8'	Report

Al-Hilal Stadium, Omdurman
Referee: Youssef Essrayri (Tunisia)
23 August 2015
20:30 UTC+1

Moghreb Tétouan (Morocco)	2–1	(Egypt) Smouha
Tato 13'; Khadrouf 74' (pen.)	Report	Al Mounofi 76'

Stade Saniat Rmel, Tétouan
Referee: Bakary Gassama (Gambia)

12 September 2015
15:30 UTC+2

TP Mazembe (Democratic Republic of the Congo)	5–0	(Morocco) Moghreb Tétouan
Samatta 11', 52', 89'; Kalaba 31'; Assalé 88'	Report

Stade TP Mazembe, Lubumbashi
Referee: Janny Sikazwe (Zambia)
12 September 2015
15:30 UTC+2

Smouha (Egypt)	1–1	(Sudan) Al-Hilal
Al Mounofi 21'	Report	El Shigail 73'

Alexandria Stadium, Alexandria
Referee: Daniel Bennett (South Africa)

=== Group B ===
Pos	Team	Pld	W	D	L	GF	GA	GD	Pts	Qualification	USM	MER	ESS	MCE
1	(Algeria) USM Alger	6	5	0	1	9	3	+6	15	Advance to knockout stage	—	1–0	3–0	2–1
2	(Sudan) Al-Merrikh	6	4	1	1	9	4	+5	13	Advance to knockout stage	1–0	—	2–0	2–0
3	(Algeria) ES Sétif	6	1	2	3	5	10	−5	5		1–2	1–1	—	2–2
4	(Algeria) MC El Eulma	6	0	1	5	5	11	−6	1		0–1	2–3	0–1	—

Source: CAF
Rules for classification: Group stage tiebreakers
26 June 2015
22:00 UTC+3

Al-Merrikh (Sudan)	2–0	(Algeria) MC El Eulma
Al-Madina 6', 56'	Report

Al-Merrikh Stadium, Omdurman
Attendance: 45.000
Referee: Janny Sikazwe (Zambia)
27 June 2015
22:30 UTC+1

ES Sétif (Algeria)	1–2	(Algeria) USM Alger
Korbiaa 84'	Report	Seguer 60'; Khoualed 72'

Stade 8 Mai 1945, Sétif
Attendance: 22.000
Referee: Bakary Gassama (Gambia)

10 July 2015
22:30 UTC+1

USM Alger (Algeria)	1–0	(Sudan) Al-Merrikh
Belaïli 52'	Report

Stade Omar Hamadi, Algiers
Attendance: 18.000
Referee: Mahamadou Keita (Mali)
11 July 2015
22:30 UTC+1

MC El Eulma (Algeria)	0–1	(Algeria) ES Sétif
	Report	Mahsas 90' (o.g.)

Stade Messaoud Zougar, El Eulma
Referee: Gehad Grisha (Egypt)

24 July 2015
20:30 UTC+1

USM Alger (Algeria)	2–1	(Algeria) MC El Eulma
Beldjilali 15'; Seguer 22'	Report	Korichi 39'

Stade Omar Hamadi, Algiers
Attendance: 17.000
Referee: Bernard Camille (Seychelles)
25 July 2015
21:30 UTC+1

ES Sétif (Algeria)	1–1	(Sudan) Al-Merrikh
Ziaya 17'	Report	Jabason 23'

Stade 8 Mai 1945, Sétif
Referee: Daniel Bennett (South Africa)

7 August 2015
21:15 UTC+1

MC El Eulma (Algeria)	0–1	(Algeria) USM Alger
	Report	Meftah 49'

Stade Messaoud Zougar, El Eulma
Referee: Eric Otogo-Castane (Gabon)
9 August 2015
22:00 UTC+3

Al-Merrikh (Sudan)	2–0	(Algeria) ES Sétif
Yousif 41' (pen.); Okrah 90'	Report

Al-Merrikh Stadium, Omdurman
Referee: Joseph Lamptey (Ghana)

21 August 2015
20:30 UTC+1

USM Alger (Algeria)	3–0	(Algeria) ES Sétif
Belaïli 33'; Beldjilali 37'; Aoudia 74'	Report

Stade Omar Hamadi, Algiers
Referee: Malang Diedhiou (Senegal)
22 August 2015
20:30 UTC+1

MC El Eulma (Algeria)	2–3	(Sudan) Al-Merrikh
Kadri 15'; Abbès 25'	Report	Kamal 67'; Al-Madina 71', 90' (pen.)

Stade Messaoud Zougar, El Eulma
Referee: Néant Alioum (Cameroon)

11 September 2015
20:30 UTC+3

Al-Merrikh (Sudan)	1–0	(Algeria) USM Alger
Lebri 14'	Report

Al-Merrikh Stadium, Omdurman
Referee: Gehad Grisha (Egypt)
11 September 2015
20:30 UTC+1

ES Sétif (Algeria)	2–2	(Algeria) MC El Eulma
Belameiri 61'; Dagoulou 78'	Report	Korichi 11'; Abbès 89'

Stade 8 Mai 1945, Sétif
Referee: Joshua Bondo (Botswana)
