= Thomas Ulimwengu =

Tanzanian footballer

Personal information
- Full name: Thomas Emmanuel Ulimwengu
- Date of birth: 14 June 1993 (age 33)
- Place of birth: Tanga, Tanzania
- Height: 1.78 m (5 ft 10 in)
- Position: Forward

Team information
- Current team: TP Mazembe

Youth career
- 2008: Tanzania Soccer Academy
- 2009–2010: Moro United (loan)
- 2010–2011: Athletic FC

Senior career*
Years	Team	Apps	(Gls)
2011–2016	TP Mazembe	122	(33)
2017	AFC Eskilstuna	1	(0)
2017–2018	Sloboda Tuzla		
2018	Al-Hilal Club		
2019	JS Saoura	8	(1)
2020–2023	TP Mazembe	32	(15)
2023-	Singida Big Stars		

International career^{‡}
2008–2009	Tanzania U17	5	(3)
2009–2013	Tanzania U20	11	(13)
2009–2016	Tanzania U23	5	(6)
2009–	Tanzania	49	(7)
- * Club domestic league appearances and goals as of 28 November 2022 ‡ National team caps and goals as of 13:49, 28 November 2012 (UTC)

Thomas Emanuel Ulimwengu (born 14 June 1993) is a Tanzanian footballer who plays as a striker for TP Mazembe and the Tanzania national football team.

== Career ==
=== Youth career ===
Ulimwengu grew up in Dodoma, the Tanzanian capital, where he played for local club team Area C. At the age of 14 he was selected for the Dodoma Region U-17 team. Soon after, he was selected through a nationwide talent search to join the first class of the Tanzania Soccer Academy, a joint project between the Tanzania Football Federation and British investors.

Ulimwengu impressed at the soccer academy and was soon called up to the Tanzania U-17 national team. He was joint top scorer in the 2009 CECAFA U-17 Championship, in which Tanzania finished 2nd. After his good performance in the competition, he was regularly called up by coach Marcio Maximo to practice with the senior national team, the Taifa Stars.

=== Club career ===
In the 2009–10 Tanzania Premier League season Ulimwengu played on-loan for Moro United. The following summer, he represented Tanzania in the 2010 Copa Coca-Cola African Championship in South Africa, where he scored nine goals in five matches.

In July 2010 Thomas joined Swedish development outfit Athletic Football Club, with whom he competed in the Gothia Cup and Stockholm Cup.

On 31 August 2011 Ulimwengu joined 4-time African Champions League winners TP Mazembe. He scored in his debut, a 2–1 victory over Don Bosco.

==== International goals ====
Scores and results list Tanzania's goal tally first.

No	Date	Venue	Opponent	Score	Result	Competition
1.	29 November 2011	National Stadium, Dar es Salaam, Tanzania	Djibouti	1–0	3–0	2011 CECAFA Cup
2.	24 March 2013	National Stadium, Dar es Salaam, Tanzania	Morocco	1–0	3–1	2014 FIFA World Cup qualification
3.	16 June 2013	National Stadium, Dar es Salaam, Tanzania	Ivory Coast	2–2	2–4	2014 FIFA World Cup qualification
4.	1 June 2014	National Sports Stadium, Harare, Zimbabwe	Zimbabwe	2–1	2–2	2015 Africa Cup of Nations qualification
5.	12 October 2014	National Stadium, Dar es Salaam, Tanzania	Benin	3–0	4–1	Friendly
6.	16 November 2014	Somhlolo National Stadium, Lobamba, Swaziland	Swaziland	1–1	1–1	Friendly
7.	7 October 2015	National Stadium, Dar es Salaam, Tanzania	Malawi	2–0	2–0	2018 FIFA World Cup qualification

== Honours ==
- Al-Hilal Club

Sudan Premier League: 2018
