= Wallace Karia =

Tanzanian football executive

Vice-president of Beach Soccer Committee
- Incumbent
- Assumed office 7 October 2025

Member of CAF Executive Committee
- Incumbent
- Assumed office March 2025

President of the Tanzania Football Federation
- Incumbent
- Assumed office 2017
- Preceded by: Jamal E Malinzi

President of the CECAFA
- In office 2019–2025
- Preceded by: Mutassim Gafar
- Succeeded by: Alexandre Muyenge

Personal details
- Born: Tanzania
- Occupation: Football administrator

Wallace Karia is a Tanzanian football administrator and the current president of the Tanzania Football Federation (TFF). He is also CECAFA Association President since 2019. He won the 2021 TFF elections making him retain his seat.
