= Miloud Hamdi =

Algerian-French football manager

Personal information
- Date of birth: June 1, 1971 (age 55)
- Place of birth: Saint-Étienne, France

Team information
- Current team: Jwaya

Managerial career
- Years: Team
- 2004: ES Vitrolles
- 2009–2011: GS Consolat
- 2012–2014: Ettifaq U21
- 2015: USM Alger (assistant)
- 2015–2016: USM Alger
- 2016: Nahdat Berkane
- 2017–2018: USM Alger
- 2018–2019: Al-Salmiya SC
- 2021: CS Constantine
- 2022–2023: JS Kabylie
- 2023-2024: Al-Khaldiya SC
- 2024–2025: Young Africans S.C.
- 2025-2026: Ismaily SC
- 2026: Al Ittihad
- 2026-: Jwaya

Miloud Hamdi (Arabic: ميلود حمدي; born June 1, 1971) is an Algerian-French football manager.

== Career ==
In June 2012, Hamdi was appointed as manager of Saudi Arabian club Ettifaq's under-21 team.

In 2015, Hamdi joined USM Alger's coaching staff, initially as an assistant coach before being eventually appointed as the head coach in October.

== Managerial statistics ==
As of 7 July 2020

Managerial record by team and tenure
Team	From	To	Record								Ref
Team	From	To	G	W	D	L	GF	GA	GD	Win %	Ref
USM Alger	1 July 2015	5 June 2016	41	23	8	10	62	42	+20	56.10	
USM Alger	12 November 2017	19 May 2018	21	9	7	5	26	19	+7	42.86	
Al-Salmiya SC	8 June 2018	2019	18	9	6	3	31	23	+8	50.00	
Career totals			80	41	21	18	119	84	+35	51.25	—

== Honours ==
=== Club ===
Young Africans S.C.

- Winner 2024–25 Tanzanian Premier League
- Winner 2024–25 Tanzanian Federation Cup

JSK

- Quarter Final 2022–23 CAF Champions League

USM Alger

- Ligue 1 (1): 2015-16
- Runner Up CAF Champions League 2015

Athlético Marseille

- Winner 2011–12 Championnat National
