= Richard Kissi Boateng =

Ghanaian footballer

Personal information
- Full name: Richard Kissi Boateng
- Date of birth: 25 November 1988 (age 37)
- Place of birth: Kumasi, Ghana
- Height: 6 ft 0 in (1.83 m)
- Position: Left back

Team information
- Current team: Berekum Chelsea

Youth career
- 2001–2004: Saint Stars F.C.

Senior career*
Years	Team	Apps	(Gls)
2005–2010	Liberty Professionals		
2010–2011	Al-Ittihad Tripoli		
2011–2013	Berekum Chelsea		
2013–2016	TP Mazembe	49+	(7+)
2017	Liberty Professionals	7	(0)
2017–2019	SuperSport United	21	(0)
2020–	Berekum Chelsea	12	(0)

International career
2012–2013	Ghana	6	(0)
- * Club domestic league appearances and goals as of 3 February 2018

Richard Kissi Boateng (born 25 November 1988) is a Ghanaian professional footballer who currently plays as a left-back for Berekum Chelsea.

== Club career ==
Boateng began his youth career with Saint Stars FC, before later transferring to Liberty Professionals FC in 2004, where he began his senior and professional career. In 2008, he was nominated as Defender of the year in Ghana. In July 2010, he moved to the Libyan side Al-Ittihad, and returned to Ghana for Berekum Chelsea in September 2011. On 16 January 2013, Boateng signed for Congolese club TP Mazembe on a five-year deal.

In January 2020, Boateng returned to Berekum Chelsea.

== International career ==
On 16 May 2012, Boateng was called up to the Ghana squad for two, 2014 FIFA World Cup qualification matches against Lesotho national football team and Zambia national football team.

== Personal life ==
Boating married in 2014. He and his wife welcomed a son in 2017.

== Career statistics ==
=== International ===
As of match played on 13 January 2013.

National team	Year	Apps	Goals
Ghana	2013	2	0
Total		2	0

== Honours ==
=== Club ===
TP Mazembe

- DR Congo Championship : 2013, 2013–14, 2015–16
- DR Congo Super Cup : 2013, 2014, 2016
- CAF Champions League : 2015
- Confederation Cup : 2016, 2017, runner up: 2013
- CAF Super Cup : 2016

SuperSport United

- MTN 8: 2017
