= Tanzania Soccer Academy =

- Kigamboni; Dar-es-Salaam, Tanzania, Dar es Salaam Region

Information
- Former name: Tanzania Youth Academy
- Type: Public school
- Established: 2008; 17 years ago
- Founder: Tanzania Football Federation
- Color(s): Yellow; Blue; Black
- Affiliation: Tanzanian Premier League (TPL)

Tanzania Soccer Academy (TSA) is a national academy and development platform for young football players in the United Republic of Tanzania. TSA is a youth soccer league in Tanzania and Zanzibar, that is managed, organized, and controlled by Tanzania Football Federation. The TSA's mission is to provide education, resources, and support to impact everyday sports environments in order to develop world-class players.

In January 2008, the Tanzania Football Federation in partnership with Peter Johnson created the Tanzania Soccer Academy (TSA), a national academy to develop football and provide full education scholarships to players.
