= Leodgar Tenga =

Tanzanian footballer

Personal information
- Full name: Leodgar Paul Chila Tenga
- Date of birth: 23 September 1955 (age 71)
- Place of birth: Kilimanjaro Region, Tanzania
- Position: Defender

International career
Years	Team	Apps	(Gls)
1979–1980	Tanzania	4	(0)

Leodgar Tenga (born 23 September 1955) is a Tanzanian former footballer who played as a defender for Tanzania in the 1980 African Cup of Nations. He later served as president of the Tanzania Football Federation from 2004 to 2013. During his tenure, Tenga was elected to serve as president of CECAFA in 2007 and was re-elected in 2011 for a second term. He was a member of the CAF Executive Committee under former association President Ahmad Ahmad between 2017 and 2021.
