= 2015 CAF Champions League =

2015 Orange CAF Champions League

Tournament details
- Dates: 13 February – 8 November 2015
- Teams: 57 (from 44 associations)

Final positions
- Champions: (Democratic Republic of the Congo) TP Mazembe (5th title)
- Runners-up: (Algeria) USM Alger

Tournament statistics
- Matches played: 126
- Goals scored: 268 (2.13 per match)
- Top scorer(s): (Sudan) Bakri Al-Madina (Tanzania) Mbwana Samatta (7 goals each)

The 2015 CAF Champions League (officially the 2015 Orange CAF Champions League for sponsorship reasons) was the 51st edition of Africa's premier club football tournament organized by the Confederation of African Football (CAF), and the 19th edition under the current CAF Champions League format. The winner qualified for the 2015 FIFA Club World Cup, and earned the right to play in the 2016 CAF Super Cup.

TP Mazembe of the Democratic Republic of Congo won the competition for the fifth time in their history after a 4–1 aggregate victory over USM Alger of Algeria in the final. ES Sétif were the defending champions, but were eliminated in the group stage.

== Association team allocation ==
All 56 CAF member associations may enter the CAF Champions League, with the 12 highest ranked associations according to their CAF 5-year ranking eligible to enter two teams in the competition. The title holders can also enter. As a result, theoretically a maximum of 69 teams could enter the tournament – although this level has never been reached.

For the 2015 CAF Champions League, the CAF uses the 2009–2013 CAF 5-year ranking, which calculates points for each entrant association based on their clubs’ performance over those 5 years in the CAF Champions League and CAF Confederation Cup. The criteria for points are the following:

	CAF Champions League	CAF Confederation Cup
Winner	5 points	4 points
Runner-up	4 points	3 points
Losing semi-finalists	3 points	2 points
3rd place in groups	2 points	1 point
4th place in groups	1 point	1 point

The points are multiplied by a coefficient according to the year as follows:

- 2013 – 5
- 2012 – 4
- 2011 – 3
- 2010 – 2
- 2009 – 1

== Teams ==
The following 57 teams from 44 associations entered the competition.

Teams in bold received a bye to the first round. The other teams entered the preliminary round.

Associations are shown according to their 2009–2013 CAF 5-year ranking – those with a ranking score have their rank and score indicated.

Association	Team	Qualifying method
Associations eligible to enter two teams (Ranked 1–12)
Tunisia (1st – 106 pts)	**Espérance de Tunis**	2013–14 Tunisian Ligue Professionnelle 1 champion
Tunisia (1st – 106 pts)	**CS Sfaxien**	2013–14 Tunisian Ligue Professionnelle 1 runner-up
Egypt (2nd – 80 pts)	**Al-Ahly**	2013–14 Egyptian Premier League champion
Egypt (2nd – 80 pts)	Smouha	2013–14 Egyptian Premier League runner-up
(Democratic Republic of the Congo) DR Congo (3rd – 46 pts)	**TP Mazembe**	2013–14 Linafoot champion
(Democratic Republic of the Congo) DR Congo (3rd – 46 pts)	SM Sanga Balende	2013–14 Linafoot runner-up
Morocco (4th – 44 pts)	Moghreb Tétouan	2013–14 Botola champion
Morocco (4th – 44 pts)	Raja Casablanca	2013–14 Botola runner-up
Nigeria (5th – 41 pts)	Kano Pillars	2014 Nigeria Professional Football League champion
Nigeria (5th – 41 pts)	Enyimba	2014 Nigeria Professional Football League runner-up
Sudan (6th – 37 pts)	Al-Hilal	2014 Sudan Premier League champion
Sudan (6th – 37 pts)	Al-Merrikh	2014 Sudan Premier League runner-up
Algeria (T-7th – 32 pts)	USM Alger	2013–14 Algerian Ligue Professionnelle 1 champion
Algeria (T-7th – 32 pts)	**ES Sétif**	Title holders (2014 CAF Champions League winner); 2013–14 Algerian Ligue Professionnelle 1 third place
Algeria (T-7th – 32 pts)	MC El Eulma	2013–14 Algerian Ligue Professionnelle 1 fourth place
Mali (T-7th – 32 pts)	Stade Malien	2013–14 Malian Première Division champion
Mali (T-7th – 32 pts)	Club Olympique de Bamako	2013–14 Malian Première Division runner-up
Cameroon (T-9th – 21 pts)	**Coton Sport**	2014 Elite One champion
Cameroon (T-9th – 21 pts)	Cosmos de Bafia	2014 Elite One runner-up
(Republic of the Congo) Congo (T-9th – 21 pts)	**AC Léopards**	2014 Congo Premier League first place before abandoned
(Republic of the Congo) Congo (T-9th – 21 pts)	Diables Noirs	2014 Congo Premier League second place before abandoned
(South Africa) South Africa (11th – 20 pts)	Mamelodi Sundowns	2013–14 South African Premier Division champion
(South Africa) South Africa (11th – 20 pts)	Kaizer Chiefs	2013–14 South African Premier Division runner-up
Angola (12th – 17 pts)	Recreativo do Libolo	2014 Girabola champion
Angola (12th – 17 pts)	Kabuscorp	2014 Girabola runner-up
Associations eligible to enter one team
(Ivory Coast) Ivory Coast (13th – 13 pts)	Séwé Sport	2013–14 Côte d'Ivoire Ligue 1 champion
Ghana (14th – 8 pts)	Asante Kotoko	2013–14 Ghanaian Premier League champion
Ethiopia (15th – 5 pts)	Saint George	2013–14 Ethiopian Premier League champion
Libya (T-16th – 4 pts)	Al-Ahli Tripoli	2013–14 Libyan Premier League champion
Zambia (T-16th – 4 pts)	ZESCO United	2014 Zambian Premier League champion
Niger (19th – 2 pts)	AS GNN	2013–14 Niger Premier League champion
Benin	Buffles du Borgou	2013–14 Benin Premier League champion
Botswana	Township Rollers	2013–14 Botswana Premier League champion
(Burkina Faso) Burkina Faso	Étoile Filante	2013–14 Burkinabé Premier League champion
Burundi	LLB Académic	2013–14 Burundi Premier League champion
Chad	Foullah Edifice	2014 Ligue de N'Djaména champion
Comoros	Fomboni Club	2014 Comoros Premier League champion
(Equatorial Guinea) Equatorial Guinea	Sony Elá Nguema	2014 Equatoguinean Premier League champion
Gabon	AS Mangasport	2013–14 Gabon Championnat National D1 champion
(The Gambia) Gambia	Real Banjul	2014 GFA League First Division champion
Guinea	AS Kaloum	2013–14 Guinée Championnat National champion
Kenya	Gor Mahia	2014 Kenyan Premier League champion
Lesotho	Bantu	2013–14 Lesotho Premier League champion
Liberia	Barrack Young Controllers	2013–14 Liberian First Division League champion
Madagascar	CNaPS Sport	2014 THB Champions League champion
Malawi	Big Bullets	2014 Super League of Malawi champion
Mozambique	Liga Muçulmana	2014 Moçambola champion
Rwanda	APR	2013–14 Rwanda National Football League champion
Senegal	AS Pikine	2013–14 Senegal Premier League champion
Seychelles	St Michel United	2014 Seychelles First Division champion
(Sierra Leone) Sierra Leone	East End Lions	2014 Sierra Leone National Premier League first place before abandoned
(South Sudan) South Sudan	Al-Malakia	2014 South Sudan National Cup winner
(Eswatini) Swaziland	Mbabane Swallows	2013–14 Swazi Premier League runner-up
Tanzania	Azam	2013–14 Tanzanian Premier League champion
Togo	AC Semassi	2014 Togolese Championnat National champion
Uganda	Kampala City Council	2013–14 Uganda Super League champion
Zanzibar	KMKM	2013–14 Zanzibar Premier League champion

Associations which did not enter a team
- Zimbabwe (18th – 3 pts)
- (Cape Verde) Cape Verde
- (Central African Republic) Central African Republic
- Djibouti
- Eritrea
- Guinea-Bissau
- Mauritania
- Mauritius
- Namibia
- Réunion
- (São Tomé and Príncipe) São Tomé and Príncipe
- Somalia

Notes

1. Algeria (ALG): JS Kabylie, the 2013–14 Algerian Ligue Professionnelle 1 runner-up, was suspended by the CAF for two years due to the death of Albert Ebossé during their league home match against USM Alger. On 11 February 2015, the CAS overturned the suspension. However, their replacement MC El Eulma continued to represent Algeria in the 2015 CAF Champions League.
2. Gambia (GAM): Gambia were originally not able to enter a team after the association was suspended from all CAF competitions for two years for deliberately fielding overage players in the 2015 African U-20 Championship qualification match against Liberia, but the ban was lifted by the CAF following new election of the Gambia Football Association.

== Schedule ==
The schedule of the competition was as follows (all draws are held at the CAF headquarters in Cairo, Egypt).

Phase	Round	Draw date	First leg	Second leg
Qualifying	Preliminary round	22 December 2014	13–15 February 2015	27 February–1 March 2015
Qualifying	First round	22 December 2014	13–15 March 2015	3–5 April 2015
Qualifying	Second round	22 December 2014	17–19 April 2015	1–3 May 2015
Group stage	Matchday 1	5 May 2015	26–28 June 2015	
Group stage	Matchday 2	5 May 2015	10–12 July 2015	
Group stage	Matchday 3	5 May 2015	24–26 July 2015	
Group stage	Matchday 4	5 May 2015	7–9 August 2015	
Group stage	Matchday 5	5 May 2015	21–23 August 2015	
Group stage	Matchday 6	5 May 2015	11–13 September 2015	
Knockout stage	Semi-finals	5 May 2015	25–27 September 2015	2–4 October 2015
Knockout stage	Final	5 May 2015	30 October–1 November 2015	6–8 November 2015

== Qualifying rounds ==
The draw for the preliminary, first and second qualifying rounds was held on 22 December 2014.

Qualification ties were played on a home-and-away two-legged basis. If the aggregate score was tied after the second leg, the away goals rule would be applied, and if still level, the penalty shoot-out would be used to determine the winner (no extra time would be played).

=== Preliminary round ===
Team 1	Agg.	Team 2	1st leg	2nd leg
Mbabane Swallows (Eswatini)	1–2	(Zambia) ZESCO United	1–1	0–1
Séwé Sport (Ivory Coast)	2–3	(Guinea) AS Kaloum	1–2	1–1
USM Alger (Algeria)	4–3	(Chad) Foullah Edifice	3–0	1–3
AS Pikine (Senegal)	1–0	(Burkina Faso) Étoile Filante	1–0	0–0
Al-Hilal (Sudan)	2–1	(Zanzibar) KMKM	2–0	0–1
Fomboni Club (Comoros)	2–3	(Malawi) Big Bullets	0–1	2–2
Recreativo do Libolo (Angola)	3–3 (a)	(Democratic Republic of the Congo) SM Sanga Balende	3–1	0–2
Kampala City Council (Uganda)	1–3	(Cameroon) Cosmos de Bafia	1–0	0–3
Azam (Tanzania)	2–3	(Sudan) Al-Merrikh	2–0	0–3
LLB Académic (Burundi)	0–1	(Angola) Kabuscorp	0–0	0–1
Sony Elá Nguema (Equatorial Guinea)	1–2	(Togo) AC Semassi	1–1	0–1
MC El Eulma (Algeria)	2–2 (a)	(Ethiopia) Saint George	1–0	1–2
East End Lions (Sierra Leone)	w/o	(Ghana) Asante Kotoko	—	—
Enyimba (Nigeria)	4–0	(Benin) Buffles du Borgou	3–0	1–0
Al-Ahli Tripoli (Libya)	1–1 (3–5 p)	(Egypt) Smouha	1–0	0–1
Gor Mahia (Kenya)	3–3 (a)	(Madagascar) CNaPS Sport	1–0	2–3
Liga Muçulmana (Mozambique)	1–2	(Rwanda) APR	0–0	1–2
Club Olympique de Bamako (Mali)	2–3	(Morocco) Moghreb Tétouan	2–0	0–3
Al-Malakia (South Sudan)	0–5	(Nigeria) Kano Pillars	0–2	0–3
Real Banjul (The Gambia)	2–1	(Liberia) Barrack Young Controllers	1–1	1–0
Kaizer Chiefs (South Africa)	3–1	(Botswana) Township Rollers	2–1	1–0
Raja Casablanca (Morocco)	6–2	(Republic of the Congo) Diables Noirs	4–0	2–2
St Michel United (Seychelles)	1–4	(South Africa) Mamelodi Sundowns	1–1	0–3
AS Mangasport (Gabon)	1–0	(Lesotho) Bantu	1–0	0–0
Stade Malien (Mali)	1–1 (a)	(Niger) AS GNN	0–0	1–1

Notes

1. Asante Kotoko won on walkover after East End Lions withdrew.

=== First round ===
Team 1	Agg.	Team 2	1st leg	2nd leg
ZESCO United (Zambia)	2–2 (4–5 p)	(Guinea) AS Kaloum	1–1	1–1
USM Alger (Algeria)	6–2	(Senegal) AS Pikine	5–1	1–1
Al-Hilal (Sudan)	5–1	(Malawi) Big Bullets	4–0	1–1
Coton Sport (Cameroon)	0–2	(Democratic Republic of the Congo) SM Sanga Balende	0–0	0–2
Cosmos de Bafia (Cameroon)	1–4	(Tunisia) Espérance de Tunis	0–1	1–3
Al-Merrikh (Sudan)	3–2	(Angola) Kabuscorp	2–0	1–2
AC Semassi (Togo)	0–6	(Tunisia) CS Sfaxien	0–5	0–1
MC El Eulma (Algeria)	2–1	(Ghana) Asante Kotoko	0–0	2–1
Enyimba (Nigeria)	1–2	(Egypt) Smouha	1–0	0–2
Gor Mahia (Kenya)	0–2	(Republic of the Congo) AC Léopards	0–1	0–1
APR (Rwanda)	0–4	(Egypt) Al-Ahly	0–2	0–2
Moghreb Tétouan (Morocco)	5–2	(Nigeria) Kano Pillars	4–0	1–2
Real Banjul (The Gambia)	1–3	(Algeria) ES Sétif	1–1	0–2
Kaizer Chiefs (South Africa)	0–3	(Morocco) Raja Casablanca	0–1	0–2
Mamelodi Sundowns (South Africa)	2–3	(Democratic Republic of the Congo) TP Mazembe	1–0	1–3
AS Mangasport (Gabon)	2–5	(Mali) Stade Malien	1–3	1–2

=== Second round ===
Team 1	Agg.	Team 2	1st leg	2nd leg
USM Alger (Algeria)	3–2	(Guinea) AS Kaloum	2–1	1–1
SM Sanga Balende (Democratic Republic of the Congo)	0–2	(Sudan) Al-Hilal	0–1	0–1
Al-Merrikh (Sudan)	2–2 (a)	(Tunisia) Espérance de Tunis	1–0	1–2
MC El Eulma (Algeria)	1–1 (7–6 p)	(Tunisia) CS Sfaxien	1–0	0–1
AC Léopards (Republic of the Congo)	1–2	(Egypt) Smouha	1–0	0–2
Moghreb Tétouan (Morocco)	1–1 (4–3 p)	(Egypt) Al-Ahly	1–0	0–1
Raja Casablanca (Morocco)	4–4 (1–4 p)	(Algeria) ES Sétif	2–2	2–2
Stade Malien (Mali)	3–4	(Democratic Republic of the Congo) TP Mazembe	2–2	1–2

The losers of the second round entered the 2015 CAF Confederation Cup play-off round.

== Group stage ==
Location of teams of the 2015 CAF Champions League group stage.
Group A.
Group B.

The draw for the group stage was held on 5 May 2015, 11:00 UTC+2, at the CAF headquarters in Cairo, Egypt. The eight winners of the second round were drawn into two groups of four. Each group contained one team from Pot 1, one team from Pot 2, and two teams from Pot 3. The seeding of each team was determined by their ranking points calculated based on performances in continental club championships for the period 2010–2014.

The following eight teams were entered into the draw:

Pot 1	Pot 2	Pot 3
(Democratic Republic of the Congo) TP Mazembe (41 pts); (Algeria) ES Sétif (31 pts)	(Sudan) Al-Hilal (24 pts); (Sudan) Al-Merrikh (6 pts)	(Algeria) MC El Eulma (0 pt); (Algeria) USM Alger (0 pt); (Egypt) Smouha (0 pt); (Morocco) Moghreb Tétouan (0 pt)

Each group was played on a home-and-away round-robin basis. The winners and runners-up of each group advanced to the semi-finals.

Tiebreakers
The teams were ranked according to points (3 points for a win, 1 point for a draw, 0 points for a loss). If tied on points, tiebreakers would be applied in the following order:
1. Number of points obtained in games between the teams concerned;
2. Goal difference in games between the teams concerned;
3. Goals scored in games between the teams concerned;
4. Away goals scored in games between the teams concerned;
5. If, after applying criteria 1 to 4 to several teams, two teams still have an equal ranking, criteria 1 to 4 are reapplied exclusively to the matches between the two teams in question to determine their final rankings. If this procedure does not lead to a decision, criteria 6 to 9 apply;
6. Goal difference in all games;
7. Goals scored in all games;
8. Away goals scored in all games;
9. Drawing of lots.

=== Group A ===
Pos	Team	Pld	W	D	L	GF	GA	GD	Pts	Qualification	TPM	HIL	MAT	SMO
1	(Democratic Republic of the Congo) TP Mazembe	6	3	2	1	8	1	+7	11	Advance to knockout stage	—	0–0	5–0	1–0
2	(Sudan) Al-Hilal	6	2	3	1	5	3	+2	9	Advance to knockout stage	1–0	—	0–1	2–0
3	(Morocco) Moghreb Tétouan	6	2	2	2	6	10	−4	8		0–0	1–1	—	2–1
4	(Egypt) Smouha	6	1	1	4	5	10	−5	4		0–2	1–1	3–2	—

Source: CAF

=== Group B ===
Pos	Team	Pld	W	D	L	GF	GA	GD	Pts	Qualification	USM	MER	ESS	MCE
1	(Algeria) USM Alger	6	5	0	1	9	3	+6	15	Advance to knockout stage	—	1–0	3–0	2–1
2	(Sudan) Al-Merrikh	6	4	1	1	9	4	+5	13	Advance to knockout stage	1–0	—	2–0	2–0
3	(Algeria) ES Sétif	6	1	2	3	5	10	−5	5		1–2	1–1	—	2–2
4	(Algeria) MC El Eulma	6	0	1	5	5	11	−6	1		0–1	2–3	0–1	—

Source: CAF

== Knockout stage ==
Knockout ties were played on a home-and-away two-legged basis. If the aggregate score was tied after the second leg, the away goals rule would be applied, and if still level, the penalty shoot-out would be used to determine the winner (no extra time would be played).

=== Bracket ===
Semi-finals
1	(Sudan) Al-Hilal	1	0	1
4	(Algeria) USM Alger	2	0	2
3	(Sudan) Al-Merrikh	2	0	2
2	(Democratic Republic of the Congo) TP Mazembe	1	3	4

Final
(Algeria) USM Alger	1	0	1
(Democratic Republic of the Congo) TP Mazembe	2	2	4

=== Semi-finals ===
In the semi-finals, the group A winners played the group B runners-up, and the group B winners played the group A runners-up, with the group winners hosting the second leg.

Team 1	Agg.	Team 2	1st leg	2nd leg
Al-Merrikh (Sudan)	2–4	(Democratic Republic of the Congo) TP Mazembe	2–1	0–3
Al-Hilal (Sudan)	1–2	(Algeria) USM Alger	1–2	0–0

=== Final ===
In the final, the order of legs was determined by a draw, held after the group stage draw.

31 October 2015
20:30 UTC+1

USM Alger (Algeria)	1–2	(Democratic Republic of the Congo) TP Mazembe
Seguer 89'	Report	Kalaba 28'; Samatta 79' (pen.)

Stade Omar Hamadi, Algiers
Attendance: 15.000
Referee: Gehad Grisha (Egypt)
8 November 2015
15:30 UTC+2

TP Mazembe (Democratic Republic of the Congo)	2–0	(Algeria) USM Alger
Samatta 74' (pen.); Assalé 90+3'	Report

Stade TP Mazembe, Lubumbashi
Attendance: 18,000
Referee: Bakary Gassama (Gambia)

== Top scorers ==
Rank	Player	Team	Goals
1	(Sudan) Bakri Al-Madina	(Sudan) Al-Merrikh	7
1	(Tanzania) Mbwana Samatta	(Democratic Republic of the Congo) TP Mazembe	7
3	(Morocco) Mouhcine Iajour	(Morocco) Moghreb Tétouan	6
3	(Ivory Coast) Roger Assalé	(Democratic Republic of the Congo) TP Mazembe	6
5	(Nigeria) Christian Osaguona	(Morocco) Raja Casablanca	5
6	(Algeria) Youcef Belaïli	(Algeria) USM Alger	4
6	(Zambia) Rainford Kalaba	(Democratic Republic of the Congo) TP Mazembe	4
6	(Zambia) Justine Zulu	(Zambia) ZESCO United	4
9	(Algeria) Kaddour Beldjilali	(Algeria) USM Alger	3
9	(Algeria) Mohamed Rabie Meftah	(Algeria) USM Alger	3
9	(Algeria) Mohamed Seguer	(Algeria) USM Alger	3
9	(Democratic Republic of the Congo) Kabamba Mukundi	(Democratic Republic of the Congo) SM Sanga Balende	3
9	(Ivory Coast) Hermann Kouao	(Egypt) Smouha	3
9	(Democratic Republic of the Congo) Kabongo Kassongo	(Guinea) Kaloum Star	3
9	(Morocco) Adil Karrouchy	(Morocco) Raja Casablanca	3
9	(Nigeria) Mohammed Gambo	(Nigeria) Kano Pillars	3
9	(Sudan) Mudather Careca	(Sudan) Al-Hilal	3
9	(Sudan) Nizar Hamid	(Sudan) Al-Hilal	3
9	(Burkina Faso) Boubacar Kébé	(Sudan) Al-Hilal	3
9	(Sudan) Ahmed Abdalla	(Sudan) Al-Merrikh	3
9	(Cameroon) Yannick N'Djeng	(Tunisia) Espérance de Tunis	3

== See also ==
- 2015 CAF Confederation Cup
- 2015 FIFA Club World Cup
- 2016 CAF Super Cup
