= Tanzania Football Federation =

Governing body of association football in Tanzania

CAF
- Founded: 1945
- Headquarters: Dar es Salaam
- FIFA affiliation: 1964
- CAF affiliation: 1965
- CECAFA affiliation: 1973
- President: (Tanzania) Wallace Karia
- Website: tff.or.tz

The Tanzania Football Federation (TFF; Swahili: Shirikisho la Mpira wa Miguu Tanzania) previously the Football Association of Tanzania, is the governing body of football in the United Republic of Tanzania. It oversees operations of the Tanzania national football team, Tanzania women's national team and the Tanzanian football league system which comprises the Tanzanian Premier League, Tanzanian First Division League (Championship), First League and Regional Champions League. It was founded in 1945 and has been affiliated with FIFA since 1964. Wallace Karia is the current president of the Tanzania Football Federation as of 2017.

== Structure ==
Division	League	Abbreviation	Teams	First season
I	Premier League	NBC PL	16	1965
II	Championship	CL	16	1967
III	First League	FL	16	1997
IV	Regional Champions League	RCL	28	1998
V	Youth U20 League	U20	24	2011
VI	Youth U15 League	U15	24	2011

.

== Academy ==
In January 2008, the Tanzania Football Federation in partnership with Peter Johnson created the Tanzania Soccer Academy (TSA), a national academy to develop football and provide full education scholarships to players.

== National stadium ==
The Benjamin Mkapa Stadium is a multi-purpose stadium in Dar es Salaam, Tanzania. It opened in 2007 and was built adjacent to Uhuru Stadium, the former national stadium. It hosts major football matches such as the Tanzanian Premier League and home matches of the Tanzania national football team.

== Presidents ==
- Mr. Ali Chambuso 1967–1974
- Hon. Said El Maamry 1974–1987
- Mr. Mohamed Mussa 1987–1992
- Alhaji. Muhidn Ndolanga 1992–2004
- Mr. Leodgar Tenga 2004–2013
- Mr.Jamal E Malinzi 2013–2017
- Mr. Wallace Karia 2017–present

== Staff ==
Type	Name
President	Wallace Karia
Vice President	Athumani Nyamlani
General Secretary	Kidao Wilfred
Director of Finance	Cornell Barnabas
Technical Director	Oscar Mirambo
Competition Director	Salum Madadi
Director of Legal, Media & Marketing	Boniphace Wambura
National Coach Men	Hemed Morocco (caretaker)
National Coach Women	Oscar Mirambo
Referee Coordinator	Kassim Haji Mwangia
