= Arslane Mazari =

Algerian footballer (born 1989)

Personal information
- Full name: Chakib Arslane Mazari
- Date of birth: January 6, 1989 (age 37)
- Place of birth: Oran, Algeria
- Position: Defender

Team information
- Current team: RC Relizane
- Number: 5

Senior career*
Years	Team	Apps	(Gls)
2008–2009	ASM Oran	-	(-)
2009–2010	USM El Harrach	-	(-)
2010–2011	MC Saïda	1	(0)
2011–2012	ASM Oran	-	(-)
2012–2013	MC Oran	13	(0)
2013–2015	USM El Harrach	50	(0)
2015–2016	USM Alger	5	(0)
2016–2017	DRB Tadjenanet	0	(0)
2017	CS Constantine	0	(0)
2017–2018	USM El Harrach	0	(0)
2018–2019	MO Béjaïa	6	(0)
2019–	RC Relizane		
- * Club domestic league appearances and goals as of 20:30, 1 October 2012 (UTC)

Chakib Arslane Mazari (born January 6, 1989) is an Algerian football player. He is currently playing for RC Relizane in the Algerian Ligue Professionnelle 2.

== Club career ==
Sofiane Bouterbiat signed with MC Oran in the summer of 2012, joining them on a free transfer from ASM Oran.

== Honours ==
=== Club ===
USM Alger

- Algerian Ligue Professionnelle 1 (1): 2015-16
