= Mourad Berrefane =

Algerian footballer (born 1986)

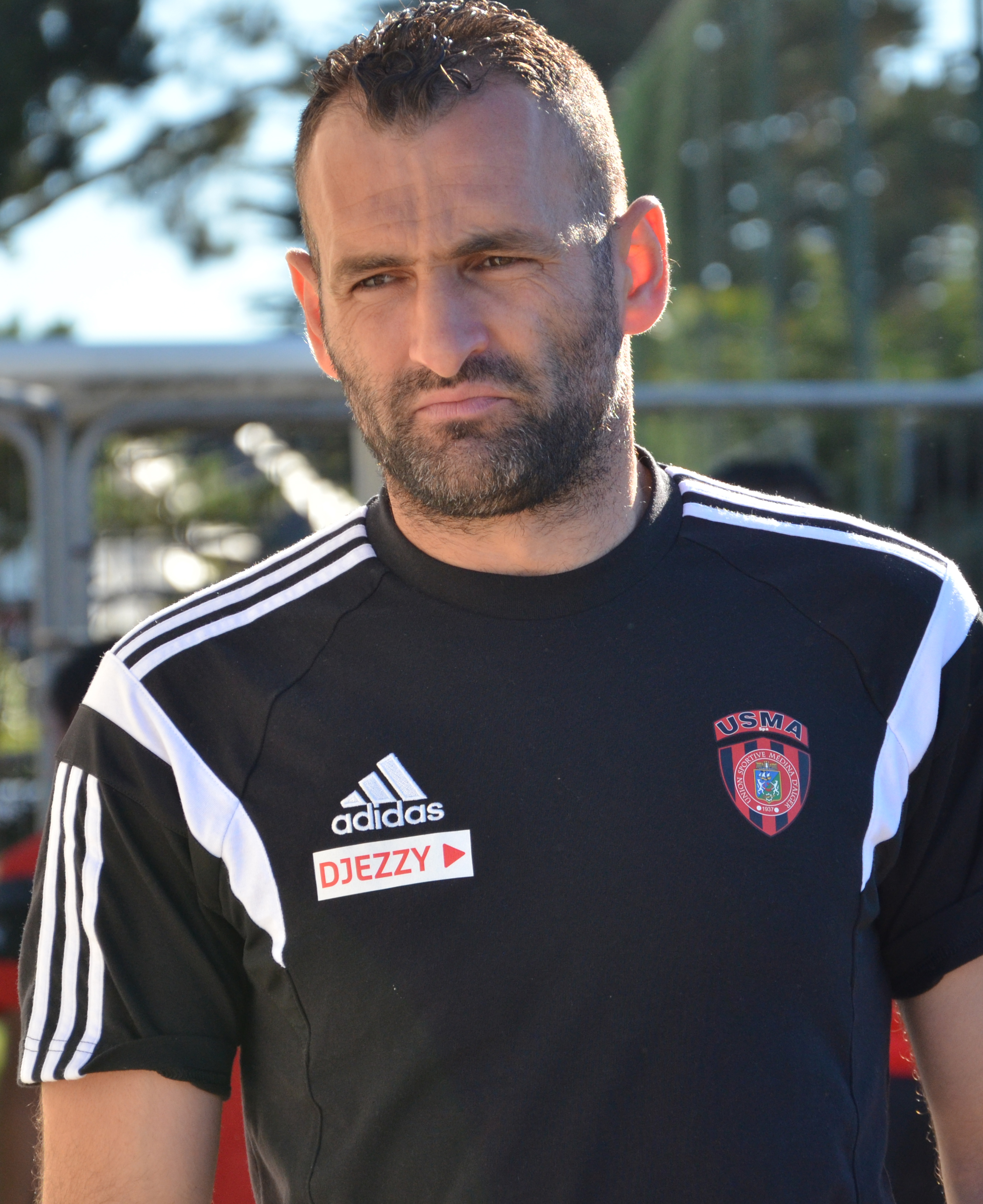

Personal information
- Full name: Mourad Berrefane
- Date of birth: 18 March 1986 (age 40)
- Place of birth: Tizi Ouzou, Algeria
- Position: Goalkeeper

Team information
- Current team: RC Relizane
- Number: 16

Senior career*
Years	Team	Apps	(Gls)
1998–1999	NRB Beni Douala		
1999–2011	JS Kabylie		
2011–2013	MC El Eulma		
2013–2014	MO Béjaïa		
2014–2019	USM Alger		
2019–	RC Relizane		

International career^{‡}
2007–2008	Algeria U20	?	(?)
2009–	Algeria U23	?	(?)
2011	Algeria Military	?	(?)
Medal record
Representing Algeria
Men's Football
Gold medal – first place	Rio 2011	Team competition
- * Club domestic league appearances and goals as of 10:00, 6 August 2019 (UTC) ‡ National team caps and goals as of 10:00, 23 February 2011 (UTC)

Mourad Berrefane (born March 18, 1986, in Tizi Ouzou) is an Algerian footballer. He currently plays as a goalkeeper for RC Relizane in the Algerian Ligue Professionnelle 2.

== Club career ==
- 1998-1999 NRB Beni Douala Algeria
- 1999-2011 JS Kabylie Algeria
- 2011-pres. MC El Eulma Algeria

== Honours ==
=== Club ===
USM Alger

- Algerian Ligue Professionnelle 1 (2): 2015-16, 2018–19
- Algerian Super Cup (1): 2016

JS Kabylie

- Algerian Ligue Professionnelle 1 (1): 2007-08
- Algerian Cup (1): 2011
- Won the World Military Cup once with the Algerian National Military Team in 2011
