= Bakri Al-Madina =

Sudanese footballer

Bakri Almadina
Personal information
- Full name: Bakri Abdelgader Babeker Muhamed
- Date of birth: 30 November 1987 (age 38)
- Place of birth: Wad Al Hadad Sudan
- Position: Forward

Senior career*
Years	Team	Apps	(Gls)
2006–2007	Al-Wefaq SC (Wad Al Hadad)		
2008	Al-Madina SC (Wad Madani)		
2009	Al-Ahli SC (Wad Madani)		(12)
2010	Al-Ahly Shendi		
2010–2014	Al-Hilal Club		(32)
2015–2023	Al-Merrikh SC		
2019–2020	→ Al-Quwa Al-Jawiya (loan)	0	(0)
2020	→ Dhofar Club (loan)		
2023-2024	Al-Ahli SC (Wad Madani)		
2024-2025	Al-Hilal SC (Al-Managel)		
2025-2026	Wad Al-Abas SC (Senar)		
2026	Al-Hilal SC (Al-Managel)		

International career^{‡}
2009–2016	Sudan	35	(7)

Managerial career
- 2026-: Al-Hilal SC (Al-Managel) assist
Medal record
Men's football
Representing Sudan
African Nations Championship
Third place	2011 Sudan
- * Club domestic league appearances and goals as of 23 August 2026 ‡ National team caps and goals as of 28 September 2020

Bakri Abdelgader Babeker Muhamed (born 30 November 1987) is a Sudanese footballer who plays as a forward for Al-Ahli SC (Wad Madani), and the Sudanese national team.

On October 11, 2014, during the African Cup of Nations qualifying match, a goal from Bakri Almadina just before half-time gave Sudan a famous victory in Khartoum.

== International career ==
=== International goals ===
Scores and results list Sudan's goal tally first.

No	Date	Venue	Opponent	Score	Result	Competition
1.	18 February 2011	Khartoum Stadium, Khartoum, Sudan	Niger	1-1	1-0	2011 African Nations Championship
2.	28 May 2011	Addis Ababa Stadium, Addis Ababa, Ethiopia	Ethiopia	1–1	2–1	Friendly
3.	28 May 2011	Addis Ababa Stadium, Addis Ababa, Ethiopia	Ethiopia	2–1	2–1	Friendly
4.	28 May 2011	Nyayo National Stadium, Nairobi, Kenya	Kenya	2–1	2–1	Friendly
5.	9 September 2013	Al-Hilal Stadium, Omdurman, Sudan	Lesotho	1–0	1–3	2014 FIFA World Cup qualification
6.	31 August 2014	National Heroes Stadium, Lusaka, Zambia	Zambia	1–2	1–3	Friendly
7.	11 October 2014	Khartoum Stadium, Khartoum, Sudan	Nigeria	1–0	1–0	2015 Africa Cup of Nations qualification

== Honours ==
Sudan

- African Nations Championship: 3rd place, 2011
