= Amine Aoudia =

Algerian footballer (born 1987)

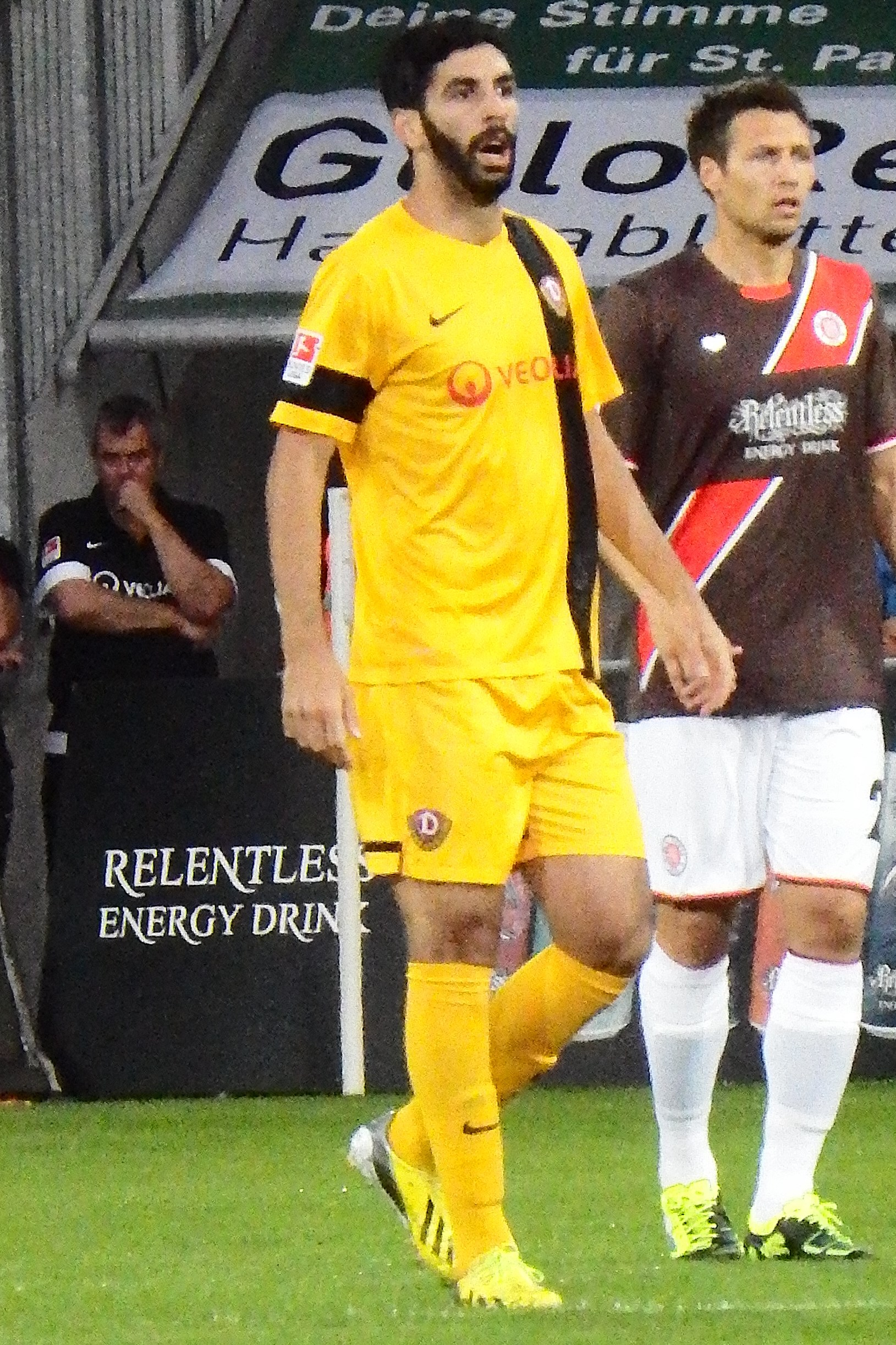
- Aoudia (left) playing for Dynamo Dresden in 2013

Personal information
- Date of birth: 6 June 1987 (age 39)
- Place of birth: El Harrach, Algiers, Algeria
- Height: 1.90 m (6 ft 3 in)
- Position: Forward

Youth career
- 2004–2005: IR Hussein Dey

Senior career*
Years	Team	Apps	(Gls)
2005–2008	CR Belouizdad	56	(14)
2008–2009	USM Annaba	21	(5)
2009–2010	JS Kabylie	27	(9)
2010–2011	Zamalek	7	(1)
2011–2013	ES Sétif	40	(24)
2013–2014	Dynamo Dresden	15	(6)
2014–2016	FSV Frankfurt	9	(2)
2015–2016	→ USM Alger (loan)	13	(2)
2016–2017	CS Constantine	20	(4)
2021	USM Blida	2	(1)

International career^{‡}
2006	Algeria U20	6	(5)
2006–2007	Algeria U23	4	(2)
2010–	Algeria	7	(0)
- * Club domestic league appearances and goals as of 21:11, 13 March 2021 (EST) ‡ National team caps and goals as of 00:00, 30 September 2015 (EST)

Mohamed Amine Aoudia (Arabic: محمد أمين عودية; born 6 June 1987) is an Algerian professional footballer who plays as a forward.

== Club career ==
Born in El Harrach, Algiers, Aoudia began his career in the junior ranks of IR Hussein Dey before joining CR Belouizdad in 2005 where he would spend the next three seasons.

=== Zamalek SC ===
On 26 December 2010, Aoudia agreed to join Egyptian club Zamalek SC on a three-year contract, with the club paying a transfer fee of $200,000 to JS Kabylie. On 29 December 2010 the deal was made official.

On 21 January 2011, Aoudia made his debut for Zamalek as a starter in an Egyptian Premier League game against El-Entag El-Harby, playing the full game which ended 0–0. A week later, Aoudia scored his first official goal for Zamalek in a 2011 CAF Champions League match against Ulinzi Stars of Kenya. Zamalek won 4–0 with Aoudia scoring the third goal of the game in the 76th minute. On 21 May 2011, Aoudia scored his first goal for Zamalek in the Egyptian Premier League in a 3–2 win over Arab Contractors SC. After coming on as a substitute in the 68th minute, with the score 1–1, Aoudia scored just three minutes later by heading a free kick from Shikabala into the net. On 18 July 2011, Zamalek's newly appointed coach, Hassan Shehata, deemed Aoudia surplus to requirements.

=== ES Sétif ===
On 31 July 2011, Aoudia signed a two-year contract with ES Sétif. The transfer fee was $175,000. In his first season with the club, he finished as the top scorer on the team with 12 league goals, helping the team win the league-cup double. The following season he was also the top scorer on the team that won the Algerian championship.

=== Dynamo Dresden ===
On 4 July 2013, Aoudia signed a two-year contract with Dynamo Dresden which became effective on 4 August 2013.

=== USM Blida ===
On 14 September 2020, Aoudia signed a one-year contract with USM Blida, joining them on a free transfer.

== International career ==
Aoudia was a member of the Algeria under-23 national team at the 2007 All-Africa Games where he started all three games and scored two goals against Guinea and Zambia.

On 27 September 2010 Aoudia was called up to the Algeria A' national team for a ten-day training camp, including a pair of friendlies against Mali.

On 30 October 2010, Aoudia was called up to the Algerian national team by head coach Abdelhak Benchikha for a friendly against Luxembourg. He made his international senior debut in that game as a 75th-minute substitute for Karim Ziani.

== Honours ==
ES Sétif

- Algerian Ligue Professionnelle 1: 2011–12, 2012–13
- Algerian Cup: 2011–12

USM Alger

- Algerian Ligue Professionnelle 1: 2015-16
