= Roger Assalé =

Ivorian footballer (born 1993)

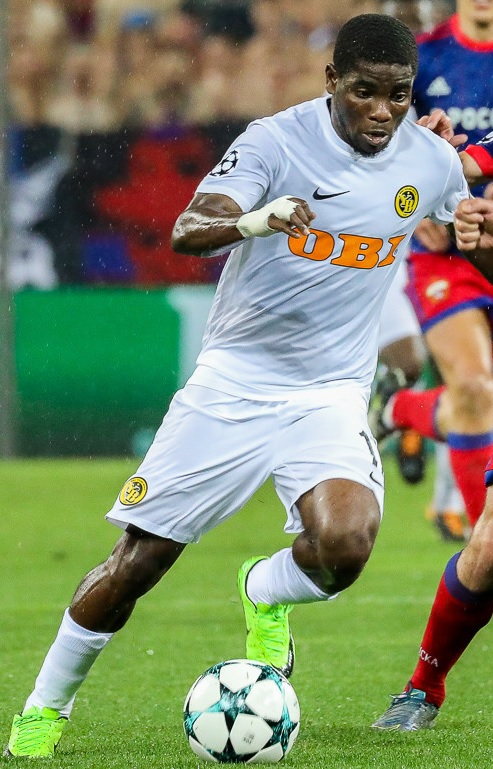
- Assalé with Young Boys in 2017

Personal information
- Full name: Micheal Claver Djapone Assalé
- Date of birth: 13 November 1993 (age 32)
- Place of birth: Abengourou, Ivory Coast
- Height: 1.67 m (5 ft 6 in)
- Position: Forward

Senior career*
Years	Team	Apps	(Gls)
2014	Séwé Sport de San-Pédro	29	(8)
2014–2017	TP Mazembe	75	(24)
2017	→ Young Boys (loan)	13	(6)
2017–2020	Young Boys	81	(25)
2020	→ Leganés (loan)	14	(2)
2020–2024	Dijon	40	(4)
2021–2022	→ Werder Bremen (loan)	6	(0)

International career^{‡}
2013	Ivory Coast U-20	4	(6)
2015–	Ivory Coast	21	(3)
- * Club domestic league appearances and goals as of 18 May 2024 ‡ National team caps and goals as of 24 May 2021

Roger Claver Djapone Assalé (born 13 November 1993) is an Ivorian professional footballer who plays as a forward.

== Club career ==
Assalé was part of the Young Boys squad that won the 2017–18 Swiss Super League, their first league title in 32 years. On 31 January 2020, he joined La Liga side CD Leganés on loan until the end of the season.

On 5 September 2020, he became a new Dijon player.

In August 2021 Assalé joined 2. Bundesliga club Werder Bremen on loan for the 2021–22 season. Werder Bremen secured an option to sign him permanently at the end of the loan. He left the club at the end of the season having made six appearances while Werder Bremen achieved promotion to the Bundesliga.

== International career ==
Assalé made his full international debut for the Ivory Coast national team in a friendly match against Cameroon on 10 November 2014. He scored his first international goal against Moldova in March 2018.

== Career statistics ==
=== Club ===
As of match played 1 June 2022

Appearances and goals by club, season and competition
Club	Season	League			National Cup		League Cup		Europe		Total	
Club	Season	Division	Apps	Goals	Apps	Goals	Apps	Goals	Apps	Goals	Apps	Goals
Young Boys (loan)	2016–17	Swiss Super League	13	6	1	0	—		—		14	6
Young Boys	2017–18	Swiss Super League	34	12	5	5	—		10	4	49	21
Young Boys	2018–19	Swiss Super League	33	9	2	0	—		6	1	41	10
Young Boys	2019–20	Swiss Super League	14	4	1	0	—		8	3	23	7
Young Boys	Total		81	25	8	5	0	0	24	8	113	38
Leganés (loan)	2019–20	La Liga	14	2	0	0	—		–		14	2
Dijon	2020–21	Ligue 1	17	1	0	0	0	0	–		17	1
Dijon	2021–22	Ligue 2	4	2	0	0	0	0	–		4	2
Dijon	Total		21	3	0	0	0	0	0	0	21	3
Werder Bremen (loan)	2021–22	2. Bundesliga	6	0	0	0	0	0	–		6	0
Career total			135	36	9	5	0	0	24	8	168	49

=== International ===
As of matches played on 27 August 2021

Appearances and goals by national team and year
National team	Year	Apps	Goals
Ivory Coast	2013	1	0
Ivory Coast	2014	2	0
Ivory Coast	2015	4	0
Ivory Coast	2016	0	0
Ivory Coast	2017	4	0
Ivory Coast	2018	4	1
Ivory Coast	2019	5	2
Total		20	3

Scores and results list Ivory Coast's goal tally first, score column indicates score after each Assalé goal.

List of international goals scored by Roger Assalé
No.	Date	Venue	Opponent	Score	Result	Competition
1	27 March 2018	Stade Pierre Brisson, Beauvais, France	Moldova	1–0	2–1	Friendly
2	6 September 2019	Stade Michel d'Ornano, Caen, France	Benin	1–0	1–2	Friendly
3	10 September 2019	Stade Robert Diochon, Rouen, France	Tunisia	1–0	2–1	Friendly

== Honours ==
Séwé Sport

- Ligue 1: 2012–13, 2013–14
- CAF Confederation Cup: Runners-up 2014

TP Mazembe

- Linafoot: 2015–16
- CAF Champions League: 2015
- CAF Super Cup: 2016
- CAF Confederation Cup: 2016

Young Boys

- Swiss Super League: 2017–18, 2018–19

Werder Bremen

- 2. Bundesliga runner-up: 2021–22

Ivory Coast

- Africa Cup of Nations: 2015

=== Individual ===
- Linafoot Top scorer: 2015–16
- Swiss Super League Team of the Year: 2017–18
