= Mohamed Seguer =

Algerian footballer (born 1985)

Personal information
- Full name: Mohamed Seguer
- Date of birth: 7 September 1985 (age 41)
- Place of birth: Relizane, Algeria
- Height: 1.87 m (6 ft 1 1/2 in)
- Position: Forward

Team information
- Current team: WA Tlemcen
- Number: 9

Youth career
- RC Relizane

Senior career*
Years	Team	Apps	(Gls)
2006–2008	MC Saïda	27	(7)
2008–2010	ES Setif	17	(3)
2010	JS Kabylie	11	(1)
2010–2012	ASO Chlef	54	(14)
2012–2016	USM Alger	71	(16)
2016–2018	MC Alger	35	(7)
2018–2019	USM Bel Abbès	0	(0)
2019–2021	RC Relizane		
2021–	WA Tlemcen	0	(0)

International career^{‡}
2007	Algeria U23	1	(0)
2008	Algeria A'	1	(0)
2008	Algeria	2	(0)
- * Club domestic league appearances and goals as of 16:00, 3 May 2018 (EST) ‡ National team caps and goals as of 00:00, 2 April 2011 (UTC)

Mohamed Seguer (Arabic: محمد سوقار; born 7 September 1985) is an Algerian football player who is currently playing as a forward for WA Tlemcen in the Algerian Ligue Professionnelle 1.

== Career ==
In 2012, he signed a two-year contract with USM Alger. In 2012, he signed a two-year contract with MC Alger. In 2019, he signed a two-year contract with RC Relizane. In 2019, he signed a two-year contract with WA Tlemcen.

== Honours ==
=== Club ===
ES Sétif

- Algerian Ligue Professionnelle 1 (1): 2008–09

ASO Chlef

- Algerian Ligue Professionnelle 1 (1): 2010–11

USM Alger

- Algerian Ligue Professionnelle 1 (2): 2013–14, 2015–16
- Algerian Cup (1): 2013
- Algerian Super Cup (1): 2013
- UAFA Club Cup (1): 2013

USM Bel Abbès

- Algerian Cup (1): 2018
