= List of foreign Algerian Ligue Professionnelle 1 players =

This is a list of foreign Algerian Ligue Professionnelle 1 players. The Algerian Ligue Professionnelle 1, which began in its current guise in 1962, has been represented by 37 nations in total. foreign nations have been represented in the Algerian Ligue Professionnelle 1.

== Angola ==
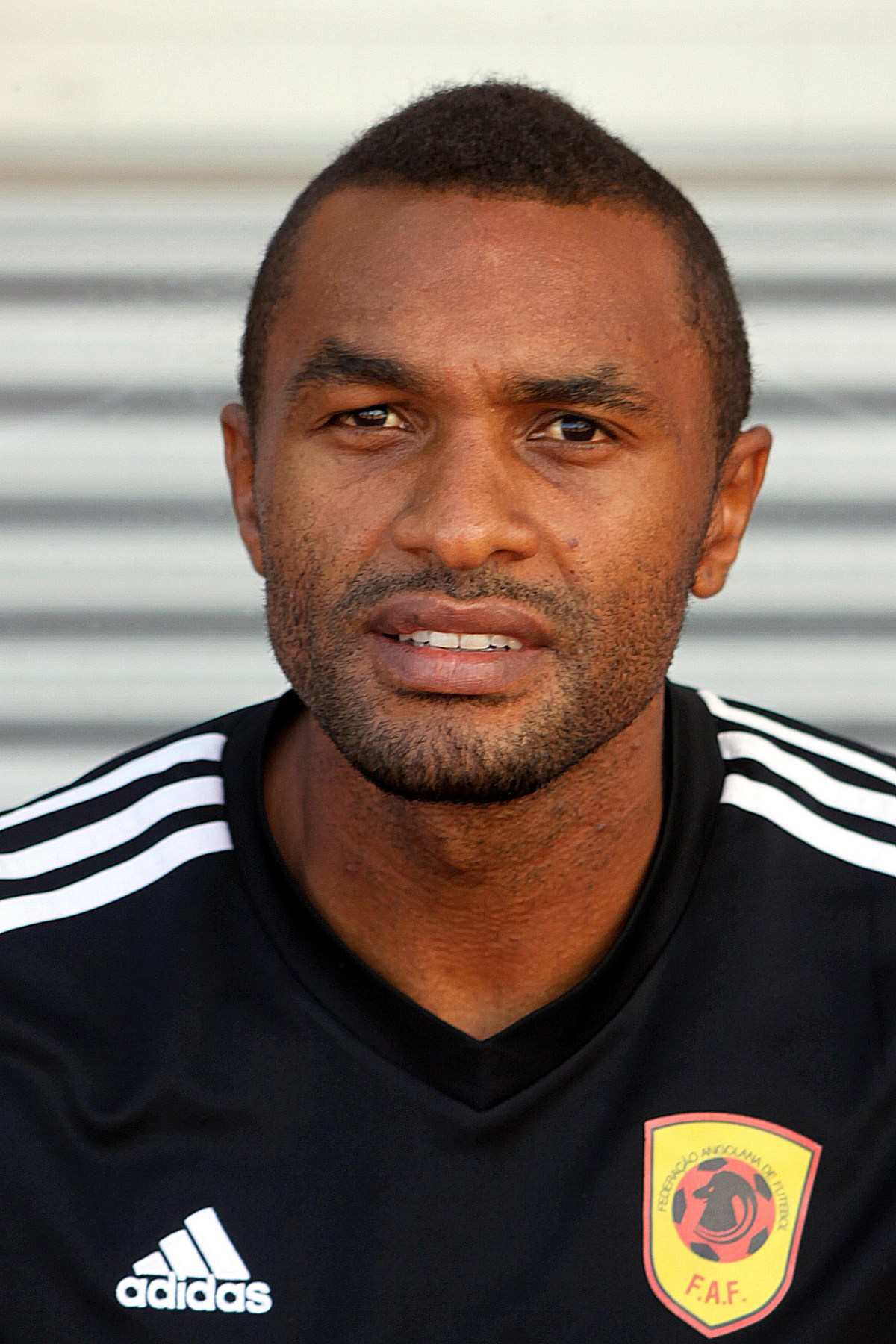
Jaime Miguel Linares.

Name	Position	Inter career	Appearances	Goals	Clubs
Jaime Miguel Linares	MF	2007–2010	77	3	CA Bordj Bou Arréridj

== Benin ==
Name	Position	Inter career	Appearances	Goals	Clubs
Wassiou Oladipupo	MF	2005–2008	42	1	JS Kabylie
Pascal Angan	MF	2012–2013	18	0	CR Belouizdad
Mohamed Aoudou	FW	2013–2017	71	17	JS Saoura; CR Belouizdad
Badarou Nana Nafiou	DF	2013–2015	42	0	ASO Chlef

== Bosnia-Herzegovina ==
Name	Position	Inter career	Appearances	Goals	Clubs
Miloš Galin	FW	2015	6	1	CR Belouizdad

== Burundi ==
Name	Position	Inter career	Appearances	Goals	Clubs
Abdul Razak Fiston	FW	2018–2019	21	7	JS Kabylie

== Brazil ==
Name	Position	Inter career	Appearances	Goals	Clubs
Rodrigo Martins Vaz	MF	2000–2001	?	?	USM Blida
Marcelo Gonçalves de Oliveira	MF	2000–2002	50	4	USM Blida
Roberson de Arruda Alves	FW	2015–2016	4	0	MC Alger

== Burkina Faso ==
Name	Position	Inter career	Appearances	Goals	Clubs
Valentin Kouamé	MF	2011–2012	2	0	MC Saida; ES Sétif
Hervé Oussalé	FW	2011–2012	15	4	MC Alger; ASO Chlef
Saidou Sandaogo	FW	2012–2013	21	5	MC Oran
Koh Traoré	FW	2010–2012	12	2	WA Tlemcen; ES Sétif
Ernest Yélémou	FW	2012	5	2	JSM Béjaïa
Harouna Bamogo	DF	2006–2008	22	1	MC Alger; WA Tlemcen
Mamadou Tall	DF	2004–2007	54	3	USM Blida
Amadou Tidiane Tall	MF	2003–2006	27	0	USM Blida
Inoussa Mawoul Zongo	DF	1999–2003	?	?	JSM Béjaïa
Harouna Traore	MF	2004–2005	?	?	USM Blida
Hamidou Balbone	FW	2003–2008	?	?	USM Alger; ASO Chlef; OM Ruisseau
Alain Nebié	FW	2009–2010	7	1	USM Alger; CR Belouizdad
Ismaël Koudou	FW	2002–2004	35	7	WA Tlemcen
Jean-Michel Liade Gnonka	DF	2000–2004; 2006–2009	105	0	RC Kouba; Paradou AC; AS Khroub
Abderrahmane Diarra	FW	2012–2013	15	4	MC El Eulma
Abdoulaye Soulama	GK	2002–2003	?	?	CA Batna
Banou Diawara	FW	2015–2016	25	11	JS Kabylie
Patrick Malo	DF	2015–2016	23	1	JS Kabylie
Ousmane Sylla	MF	2017–present	0	0	CS Constantine
Abdoul Rahim Kagambega	FW	2018–present	9	0	CS Constantine

== Cape Verde ==
Name	Position	Inter career	Appearances	Goals	Clubs
Jerry Adriano	FW	2008	6	0	USM Alger

== Cameroon ==
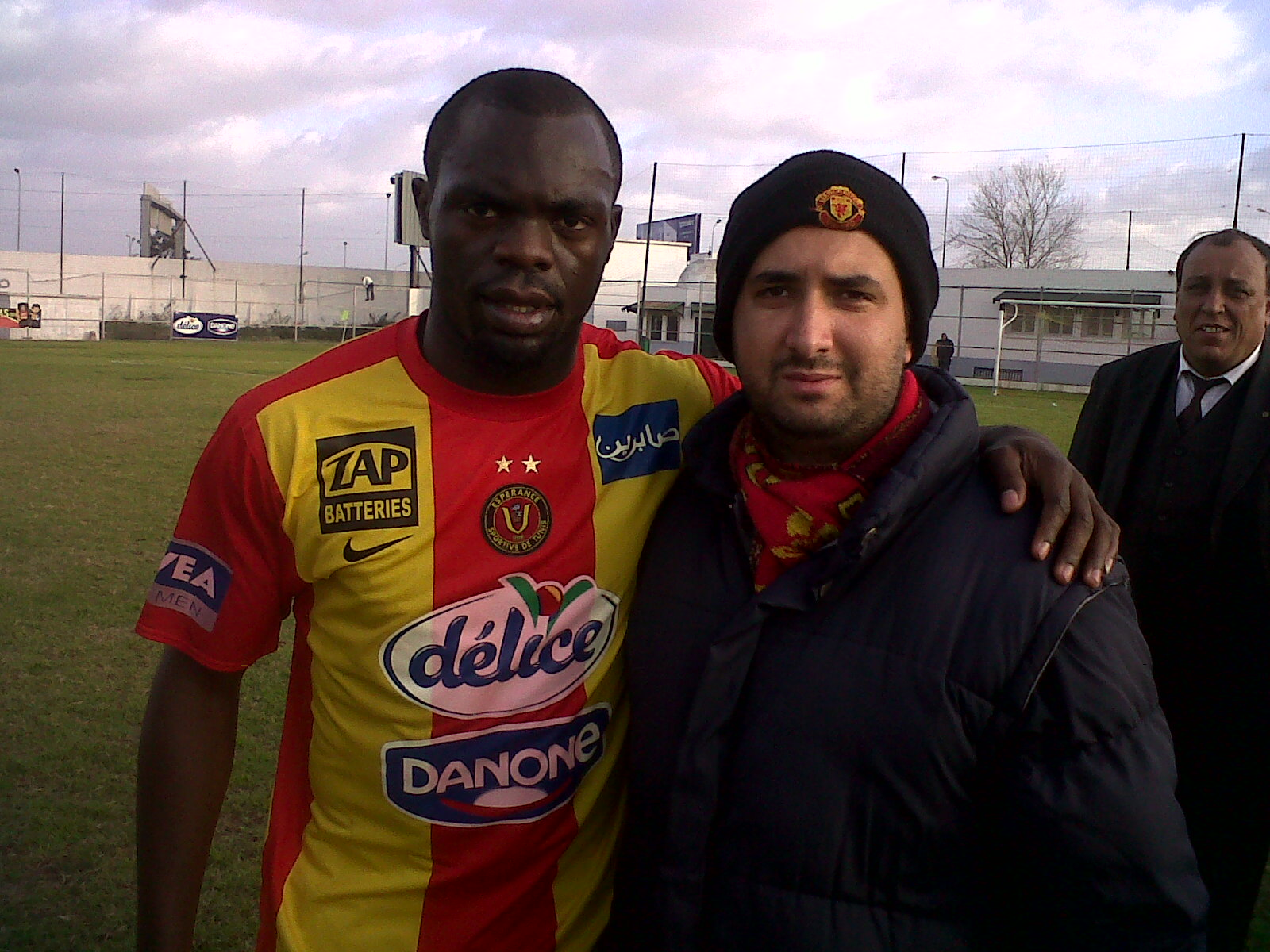
Yannick N'Djeng.

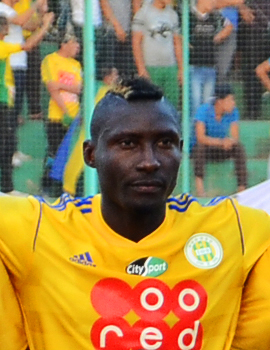
Albert Ebossé Bodjongo He is the Algerian league top scorer with 17 goals in the 2013–14 season, the player was killed before leaving the court From the Stade 1er Novembre 1954 on 23 August 2014 in a match against USM Alger.

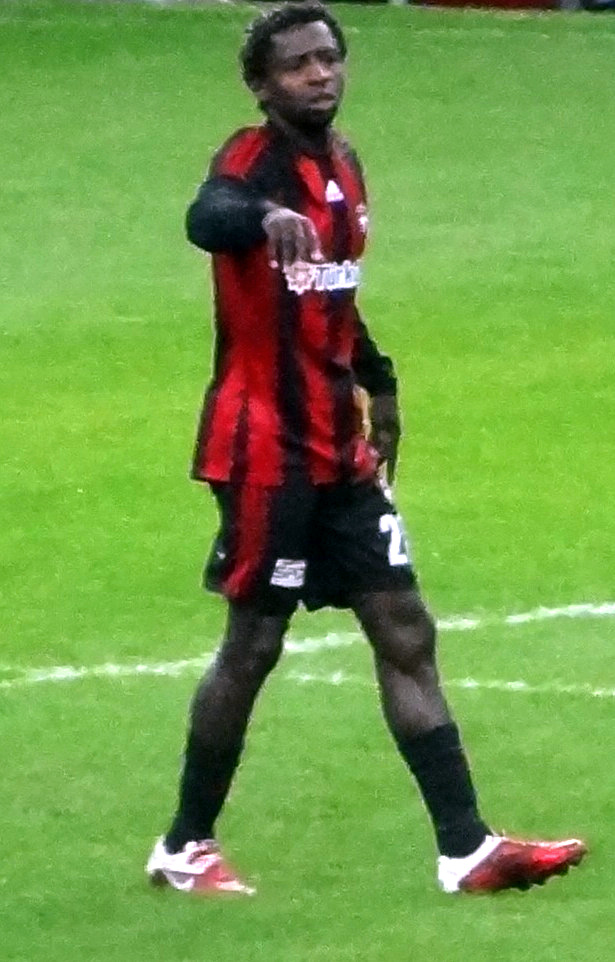
Gilles Binya He played 3 seasons with MC Oran and then moved to Benfica and is considered one of the best foreign players who played in the national championship.

Name	Position	Inter career	Appearances	Goals	Clubs
Ghislain Lazare Chameni	MF	2008	13	0	OMR El Annasser; USM Blida
Jude Kongnyuy	FW	2008–2009	9	0	USM Blida
Hervé Guillaume Boumsong	MF	2008–2010	30	0	USM Blida
Jean-Philippe Belinga	FW	2008	7	0	USM Blida
Ernest Nsombo	FW	2014	10	2	USM Alger
Nyeck Bayiha	DF	2018–present	0	0	USM Alger
Stéphane Nankop	MF	2001–2005	??	??	CA Bordj Bou Arreridj
Serge N'Gal	FW	2012	5	0	USM Alger
Daniel Moncharé	DF	2006–2009	57	0	USM Alger
Didier Bassamagne	FW	2013	0	0	ES Sétif
Gilles Ngomo	DF	2008–2016	211	13	AS Khroub; CS Constantine; CR Belouizdad
Albert Ebossé Bodjongo	FW	2013–2014	41	21	JS Kabylie
Paul Emile Biyaga	FW	2007–2012	68	9	ASO Chlef; NA Hussein Dey
Francois Xavier Koufana Eyengue	DF	2011–2012	18	0	CA Batna
Yannick N'Djeng	FW	2009–2011	75	31	JSM Béjaïa
Cyrille Ndaney	FW	2011–2013	13	1	ES Sétif; USM Bel-Abbès
Cédric N'Doumbé	MF	2015–present	0	0	MC Oran
Claude Mobitang	DF	2011–2012	23	0	MC Alger
William Yabeun	FW	2011–2013	30	4	JSM Béjaïa; WA Tlemcen
Francis Ambané	MF	2008–2013	54	18	ES Sétif; ASO Chlef; WA Tlemcen
Joël Moïse Babanda	FW	2008–2010	27	11	ASO Chlef
Patrick Kamgaing	MF	2011–2012	?	?	ASO Chlef
Anicet Eyenga	FW	2012–2013	14	0	ASO Chlef
Gilles Binya	DF	2004–2007	59	2	MC Oran
Marcel Roger Kibong	MF	2002–2004	21	0	MC Oran
Joseph Fotso	FW	2004–2007	17	2	MC Oran
Jean Michel N'Lend	FW	2007–2008	23	14	MC Oran
Alain Ketchemen	GK	2006–2008; 2008–2009	?	?	JSM Béjaïa; CR Belouizdad; MC Oran
Jean Paul Yontcha	GK	2002–2006	65	28	CA Bordj Bou Arréridj
Patrick Ngoula	DF	2014–2015	16	0	MC Alger
Christopher Mendouga	FW	2015	11	1	MC Alger
Jean Bapidi	DF	2014–2016	59	6	JS Saoura
Donald Dering Djousse	FW	2014–2015	12	2	JS Saoura
Bertrand Owoundi	MF	2013–2014	1	0	RC Arbaâ
Bruno Hameni Njeukam	GK	2005–2009	?	?	CR Belouizdad; JSM Béjaïa
Aime Gérard Mongolo	FW	2008–2011	?	15	MC El Eulma; ASO Chlef
Steve Ekedi	FW	2017–2018	8	1	JS Kabylie

== Comoros ==
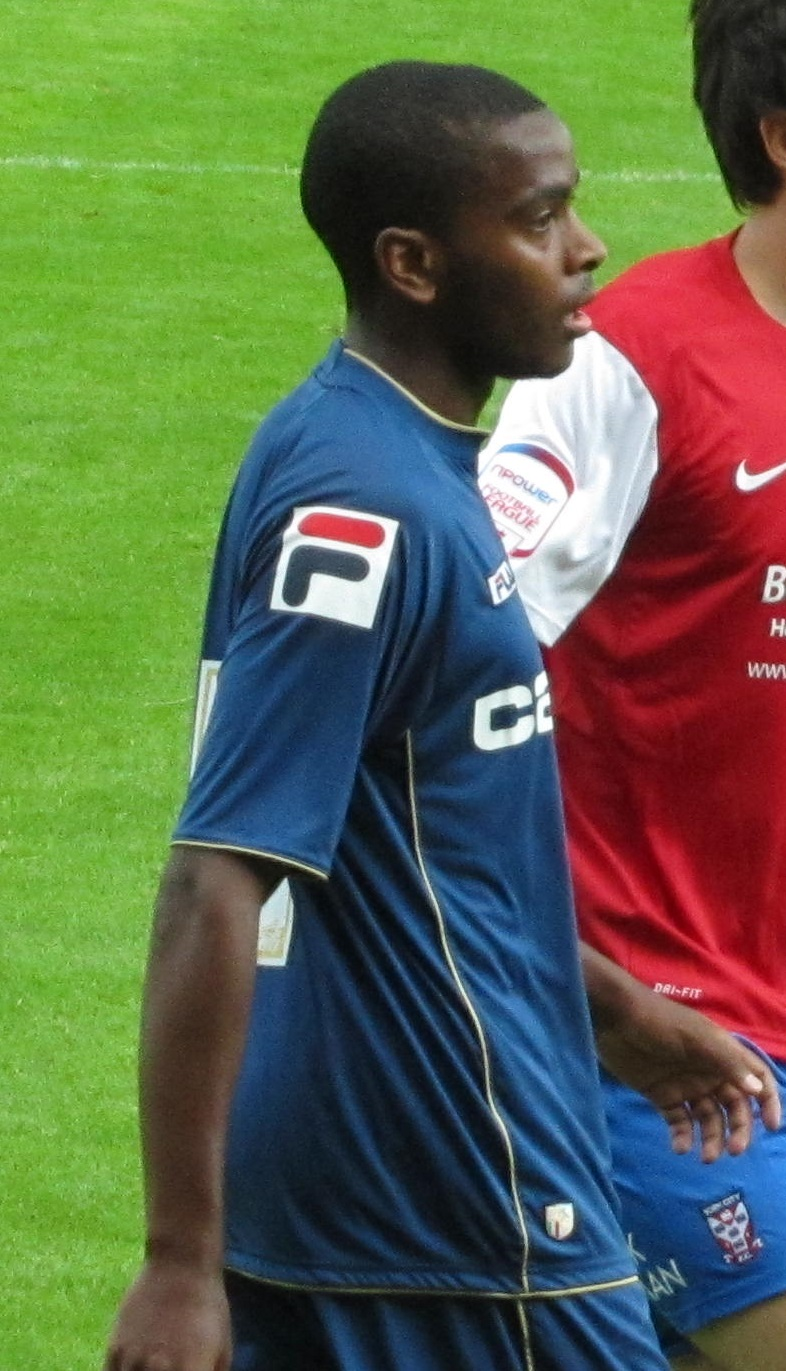
Youssouf M'Changama.

Name	Position	Inter career	Appearances	Goals	Clubs
Youssouf M'Changama	MF	2013	15	1	RC Arbaâ

== Central African Republic ==
Name	Position	Inter career	Appearances	Goals	Clubs
Eudes Dagoulou	FW	2011–2016	100	18	MC Oran; ES Sétif
Salif Kéïta	FW	2015–2016	3	0	RC Arbaâ

== Congo ==
Name	Position	Inter career	Appearances	Goals	Clubs
Wilfried Urbain Elvis Endzanga	FW	2003–2008	118	26	JS Kabylie; USM Blida
Bhaudry Massouanga	FW	2004–2006	?	?	OMR El Annasser; NA Hussein Dey
Jean-Silvestre N'Keoua	FW	2002–2003	10	0	MO Constantine
Destin Onka Malonga	GK	2008–2010	19	0	MSP Batna
Lorry Nkolo	FW	2015–2016	12	1	DRB Tadjenanet
Prince Ibara	FW	2018–2019	23	9	USM Alger
Ronel Kangou	FW	2017–2018	16	3	US Biskra; AS Aïn M'lila
Issambet Gassama	FW	2018	3	0	USM Blida

== Congo DR ==
Name	Position	Inter career	Appearances	Goals	Clubs
Jessy Mayele	FW	2015	8	1	USM Bel-Abbès
Jean-Marc Makusu Mundele	FW	2015	0	0	MC Oran
Lelo Mbele	FW	2012–2013	9	0	MC Alger; CA Batna

== Chad ==
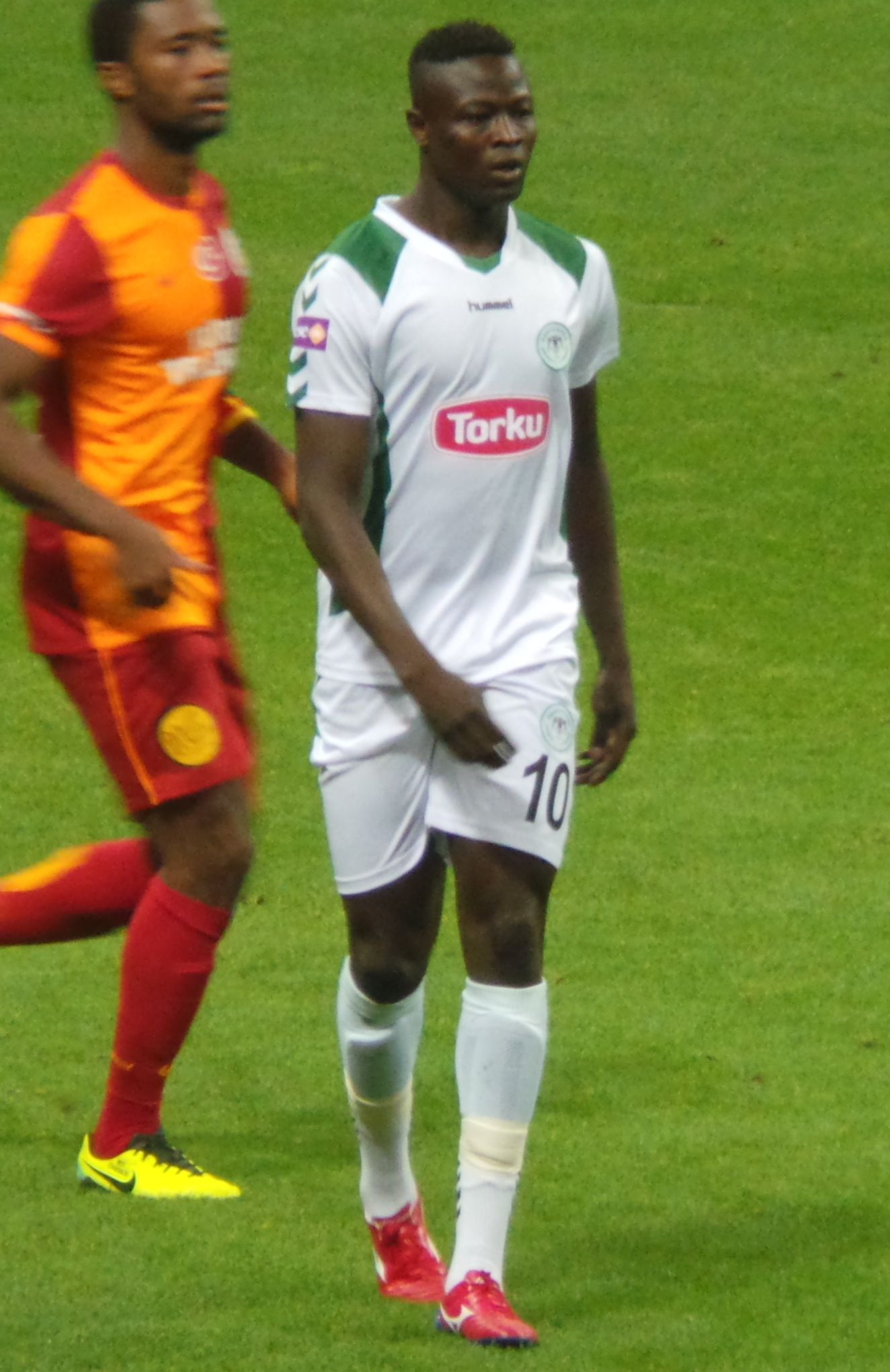
Ezechiel N'Douassel He played with three clubs over several periods. After moving from USM Blida to the Club Africain in 2010, he returned to Algeria with NA Hussein Dey to leave for CS Sfaxien from tunisia.

Name	Position	Inter career	Appearances	Goals	Clubs
Morgan Betorangal	DF	2015–2017	23	2	RC Arbaâ; MO Béjaïa
Ezechiel N'Douassel	FW	2007–2015	40	13	MC Oran; USM Blida; NA Hussein Dey
Sylvain Idangar	FW	2008–2009	2	0	ES Sétif
Yaya Kerim	FW/MF/DF	2011–2014	45	8	USM El Harrach; CA Bordj Bou Arréridj

== Djibouti ==
Name	Position	Inter career	Appearances	Goals	Clubs
Ismail Ahmed Kadar Hassan	MF	2012	4	0	ASO Chlef

== Egypt ==
Name	Position	Inter career	Appearances	Goals	Clubs
Ahmed Fathi Mohamed	FW	2014	12	1	CR Belouizdad

== Ethiopia ==
Name	Position	Inter career	Appearances	Goals	Clubs
Saladin Said	FW	2015–2016	5	0	MC Algiers

== France ==
Name	Position	Inter career	Appearances	Goals	Clubs
Freddy Zemmour	MF	1962–1968	200	10	USM Alger
Ismaël Koné	DF	2015	0	0	RC Arbaâ
Guy Zaragoci	FW	1962–1966	?	?	USM Blida
Gérard Baldo	FW	1962–1966	?	?	USM Blida
Verdier	??	19??–19??	?	?	WA Tlemcen
Penaud	??	1962–1963	?	?	USM El Harrach

== Gambia ==
Name	Position	Inter career	Appearances	Goals	Clubs
Abdou Rahman Dampha	MF	2008–2009	20	5	MC Saïda
Alieu Darbo	MF	2015	0	0	MC Oran

== Gabon ==
Name	Position	Inter career	Appearances	Goals	Clubs
Benjamin Zé Ondo	MF/DF	2013–2015	14	0	ES Sétif
Franck Obambou	DF	2017–2018	16	1	ES Sétif
Samson Mbingui	FW	2014–2016	36	0	MC Alger; MC El Eulma; NA Hussein Dey
Bonaventure Sokambi	FW	2014–2015	9	1	ASO Chlef

== Ghana ==
Name	Position	Inter career	Appearances	Goals	Clubs
Alex Asamoah	FW	2011	2	0	ES Sétif
Deen Sheriff Mohammed	FW	2011–2012	5	0	CR Belouizdad
Mussah Awudu	MF	2002–2003	14	0	HB Chelghoum Laïd; USM Blida
Hassan Masaudu	FW	2002–2003	15	0	HB Chelghoum Laïd; USM Blida
Kwame Opoku	FW	2021–	21	4	USM Alger
Samad Oppong	FW	2012	0	0	ES Sétif
Daniel Lomotey	FW	2021–	9	2	ES Sétif
Joseph Esso	FW	2021–	21	8	MC Alger

== Guinea ==
Name	Position	Inter career	Appearances	Goals	Clubs
Abdoulaye Soumah	GK	2006–2007; 2007	21	0	USM Alger; OMR El Annasser
Ibrahim Khalil Sylla	FW	2010–2011; 2013–2015; 2015–2016	72	11	MC Saida; USM El Harrach; MC Alger; USM Blida
Mohamed Coumbassa	MF	2015–2018	35	2	USM El Harrach; NA Hussein Dey
Mohamed Marko Camara	FW	2011–2012	6	0	MC Saida
Saïdouba Camara	MF	2018–present	0	0	JS Saoura

== Iraq ==
Name	Position	Inter career	Appearances	Goals	Clubs
Mohannad Abdul-Raheem	FW	2014–2015	12	4	JS Kabylie

== Ivory Coast ==
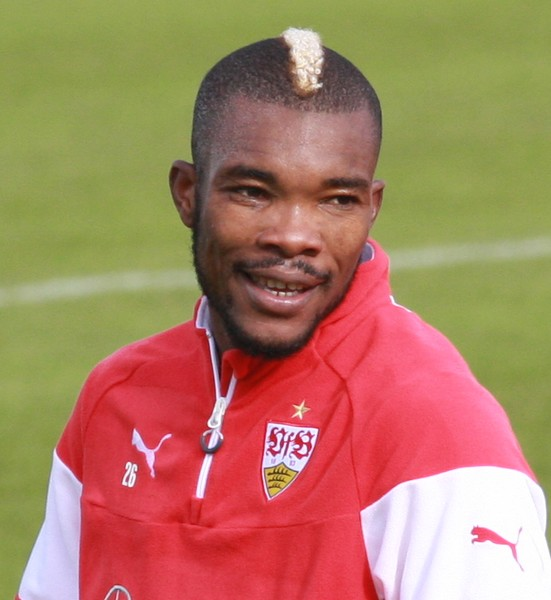
Serey Dié He played only one season and then moved to Switzerland where he joined to FC Sion.

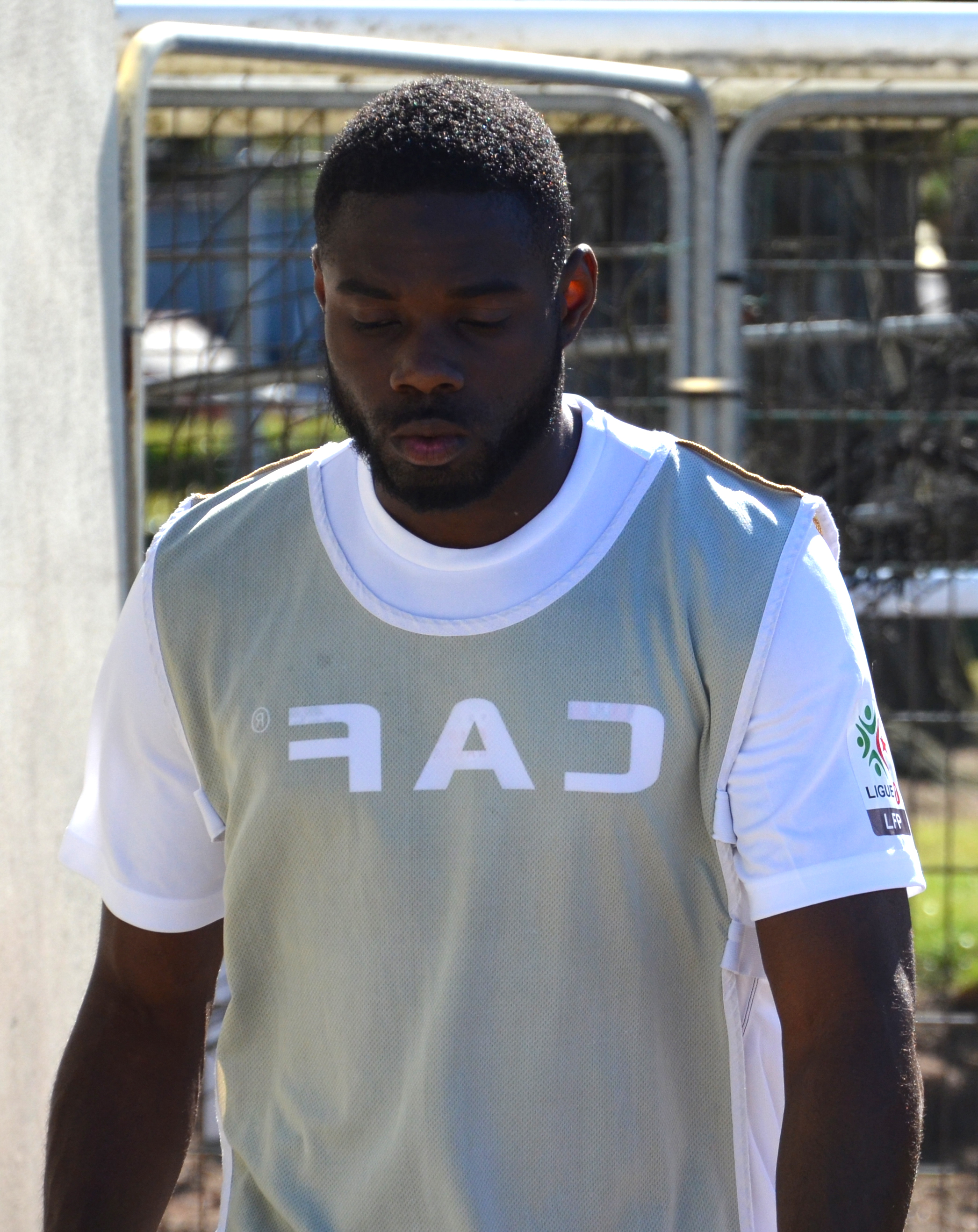
Ghislain Guessan.

Name	Position	Inter career	Appearances	Goals	Clubs
Madani Camara	MF	2009–2013	77	1	MC El Eulma; JS Kabylie
Stéphane Paul Dibi	FW	2014	3	0	MC Alger
Mechac Koffi	FW	2011–2013	30	3	ES Sétif; AS Khroub
Fabrice Elysée Kouadio Kouakou	FW	2015–2017	57	19	USM Alger; RC Relizane; CS Constantine
Alex Somian	MF	2008–2010	?	?	CR Belouizdad
Rémi Adiko	MF	2006–2009	58	8	ES Sétif
Serey Die	DF	2007–2008	11	1	ES Sétif
Guillaume Dah Zadi	FW	2001–2002	?	?	USM Annaba
Philippe Souanga	FW	2008–2010	?	?	USM Annaba
Ghislain Guessan	FW	2014–2017	57	15	RC Arbaâ; USM Alger
Zilé André Tiéhidé	MF	2015–2016	3	0	JS Saoura
Koro Issa Ahmed Koné	FW	2015–2016	10	1	CS Constantine
Edgar Loué	DF	2001–2003	?	?	MC Oran; MO Constantine
Omar Barou Kouyaté	MF	2002–2005	?	?	MO Constantine; RC Kouba

== Kenya ==
Name	Position	Inter career	Appearances	Goals	Clubs
Edwin Lavatsa	FW	2014	4	0	MC Alger
Masoud Juma	FW	2019–	3	0	JS Kabylie

== Lesotho ==
Name	Position	Inter career	Appearances	Goals	Clubs
Motlalepula Mofolo	MF	2013	4	0	MC Saïda

== Liberia ==
Name	Position	Inter career	Appearances	Goals	Clubs
Sessay Roberts		2004–2006	?	?	JS Kabylie

== Libya ==
Name	Position	Inter career	Appearances	Goals	Clubs
Mohamed Al-Tubal	MF	2020–present	0	0	JS Kabylie
Muaid Ellafi	MF	2018–present	23	6	USM Alger
Mohammad Za'abia	FW	2013–2016	43	20	MC Oran; JS Kabylie
Omar Daoud	DF	2005–2007	25	0	JS Kabylie
Mohamed Al Ghanodi	FW	2018	8	0	JS Saoura

== Madagascar ==
Name	Position	Inter career	Appearances	Goals	Clubs
Carolus Andriamatsinoro	FW	2010–2017	128	26	WA Tlemcen; USM Alger
Ibrahim Amada	FW	2011–present	131	10	JS Kabylie; AS Khroub; USM El Harrach; ES Sétif; MC Alger
Paulin Voavy	FW	2014–2016	50	6	CS Constantine

== Mali ==
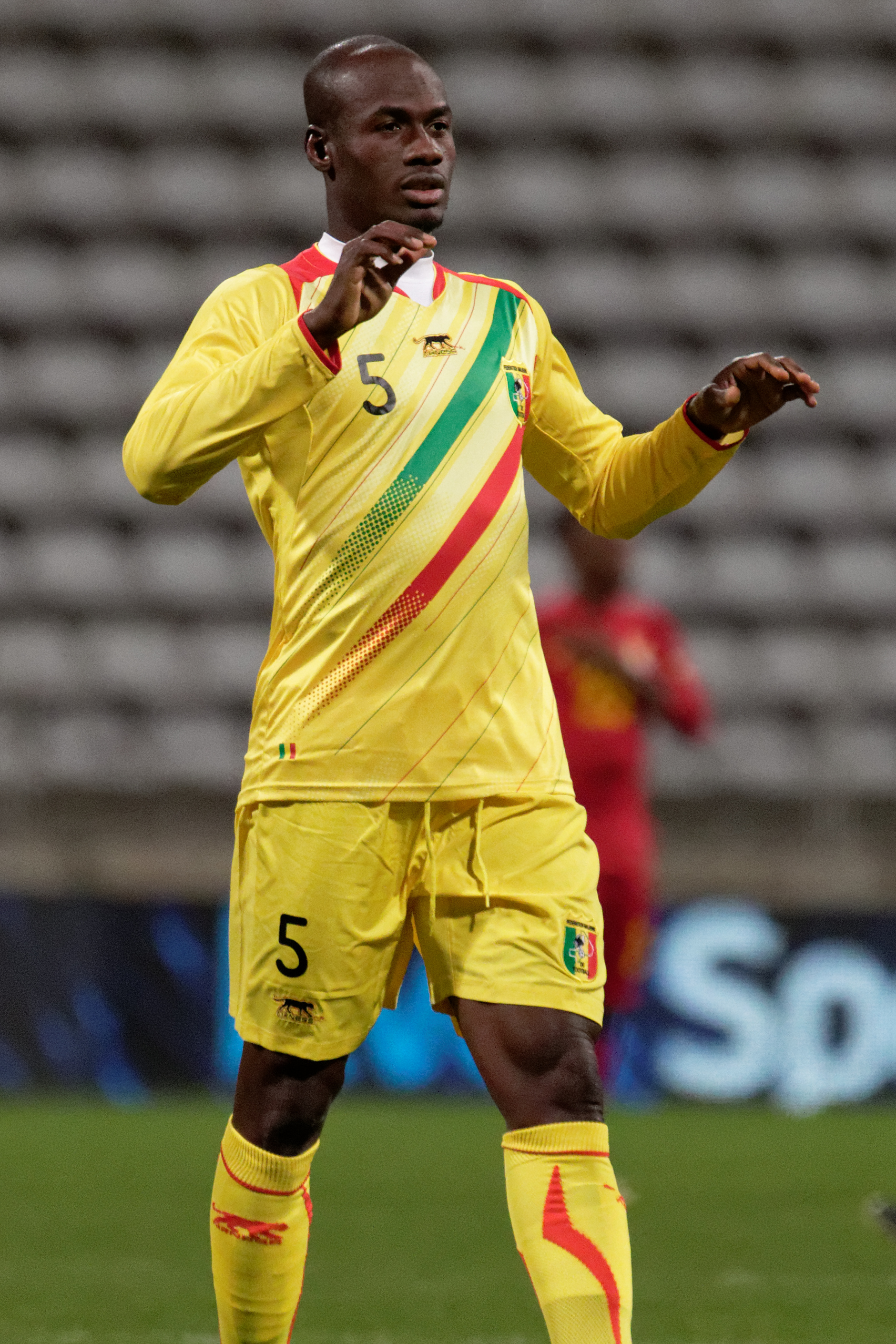
Idrissa Coulibaly He played two seasons and then went to Libya.

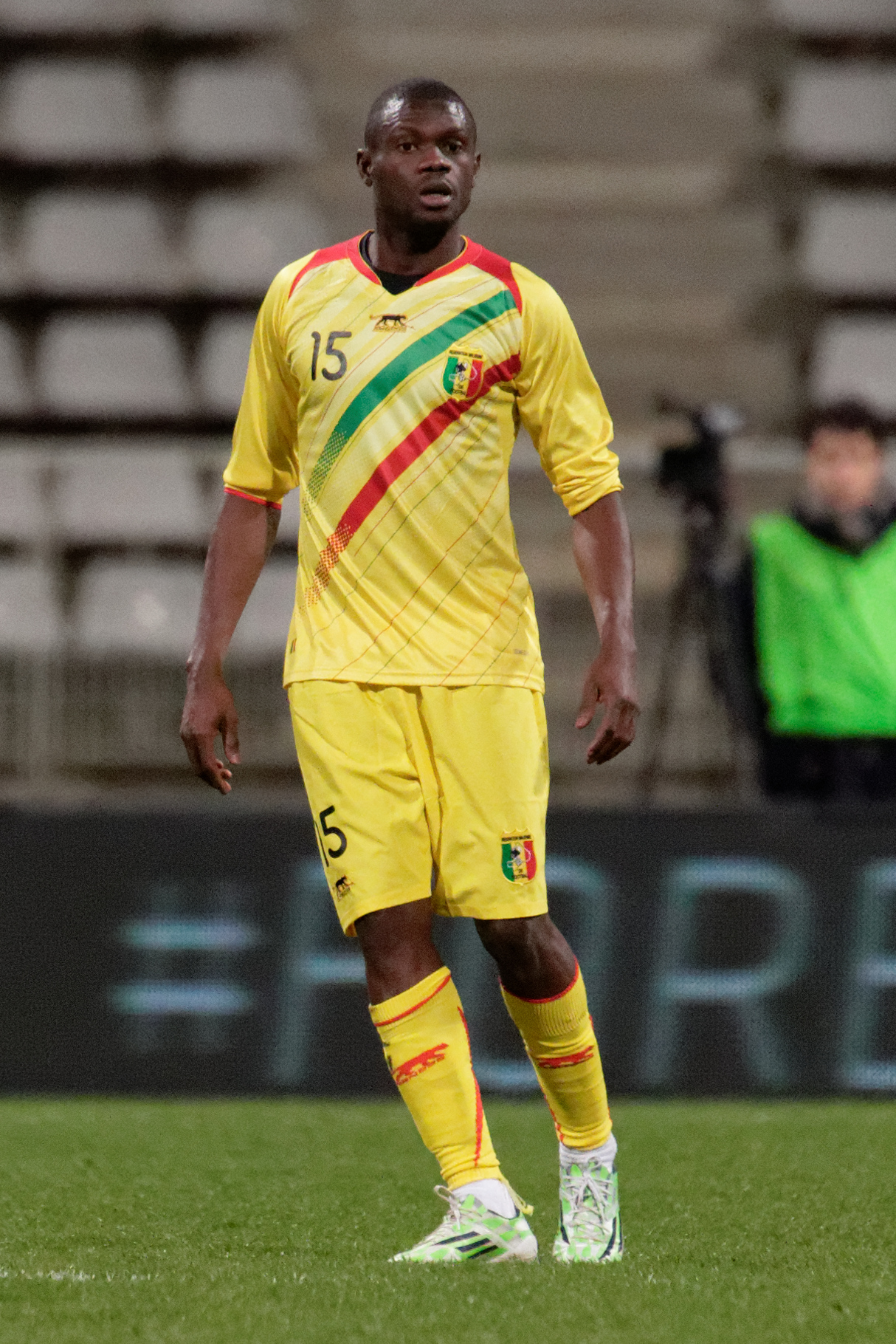
Drissa Diakité He played one season with MC Alger, then joined the French club Nice.

Name	Position	Inter career	Appearances	Goals	Clubs
Mussa Dagno	FW	???-1998			USM Ain Beida; USM Blida
Mamadou Diallo	FW	2004–2005	21	6	USM Alger
Amadou Diamouténé	MF	2010–2012	10	0	USM Alger; NA Hussein Dey
Moké Diarra	MF	2008	8	0	USM Alger
Mintou Doucoure	FW	2005–2009	91	8	USM Alger; USM Annaba
Sédonoudé Abouta	FW	2006–2007	8	0	USM Alger
Abdoulaye Maïga	DF	2010–2012	18	0	USM Alger
Sekou Bagayoko	MF	2011–2015	80	7	MC Saïda; JS Saoura; USM El Harrach; USM Bel-Abbès
Ousmane Berthé	DF	2013–2015	36	1	CS Constantine
Idrissa Coulibaly	DF	2008–2010	58	3	JS Kabylie
Makan Dembélé	FW	2012–2013	5	0	JS Kabylie
Drissa Diakité	MF	2005–2006	24	0	MC Alger
Moussa Coulibaly	DF	2004–2010	103	7	MC Alger
Rafan Sidibé	FW	2005–2009	75	19	MC Alger; MSP Batna
Cheick Oumar Dabo	FW	2006–2007	27	17	JS Kabylie
Demba Barry	DF	2007–2009; 2012–2013	70	5	JS Kabylie; ES Sétif
Souleymane Keïta	MF	2005–2007	22	4	ES Sétif
Boubacar Bangoura	FW	2012–2014	18	3	JSM Béjaïa
Moussa Coulibaly	FW	2012	3	0	JSM Béjaïa
Issa Traoré	MF/FW	2006–2007	?	?	JS Kabylie
Sékou Fofana	DF	2005–2006	21	0	USM Annaba
Soumaila Sidibe	MF	2014–present	99	1	MO Béjaïa; USM Alger; CR Belouizdad
Yahia Coulibaly	MF	2012–2014	12	2	MC El Eulma
Moctar Cissé	FW	2017–present	23	4	CS Constantine; NA Hussein Dey
Mohamed Sangaré	MF	2017–2018	6	0	Paradou AC
Aliou Dieng	MF	2018–present	0	0	MC Alger
Ismaïla Diarra	FW	2018–present	0	0	CA Bordj Bou Arréridj
Kodjo Dousse	FW	2017–present	0	0	DRB Tadjenanet; MC Oran
Malick Touré	FW	2018–present	47	9	US Biskra; MO Béjaïa; ES Sétif
Moussa Camara	FW	2018–present	0	0	MO Béjaïa
Massire Dembele	MF	2018–present	0	0	Olympique de Médéa
Lamine Traoré	FW	2018–present	0	0	Olympique de Médéa

== Mauritania ==
Name	Position	Inter career	Appearances	Goals	Clubs
Dahmed Ould Teguedi	FW	2007–2009; 2011–2012	66	9	CA Batna; MC Saïda
Oumar N'Diaye (footballer born 1988)	MF	2015	11	1	MO Béjaïa
Cheikh Moulaye Ahmed	FW	2014–2016	41	3	JS Kabylie; CS Constantine
Boubacar Bagili	FW	2017	7	1	US Biskra
Abdellah Sy	FW	2017	7	0	US Biskra

== Morocco ==
Name	Position	Years	Appearances	Goals	Clubs
Said El Bezouz	GK	1999–2001	-	-	MC Alger; USM Alger
Reda Hajhouj	FW	2018	8	2	USM Alger
Mohamed El Djezzar	FW				USM El Harrach; ASO Chlef; USM Blida

== Niger ==
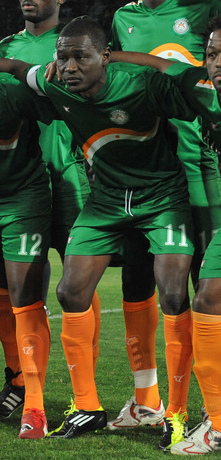
Alhassane Issoufou.

Name	Position	Inter career	Appearances	Goals	Clubs
Yacouba Ali	FW	2013	1	0	USM Alger
Jimmy Bulus	MF	2007–2009; 2011	?	?	NA Hussein Dey
Alhassane Issoufou	FW	2000–2002; 2006–2007	21	2	CA Bordj Bou Arreridj; ASO Chlef
Mohamed Chikoto	DF	2014–2016	7	0	ASM Oran
Hamidou Djibo	FW	2007–2008	?	?	ES Sétif
Kamilou Daouda	FW	2013	3	1	JS Saoura
Youssouf Oumarou Alio	FW	2018–present	0	0	DRB Tadjenanet

== Nigeria ==
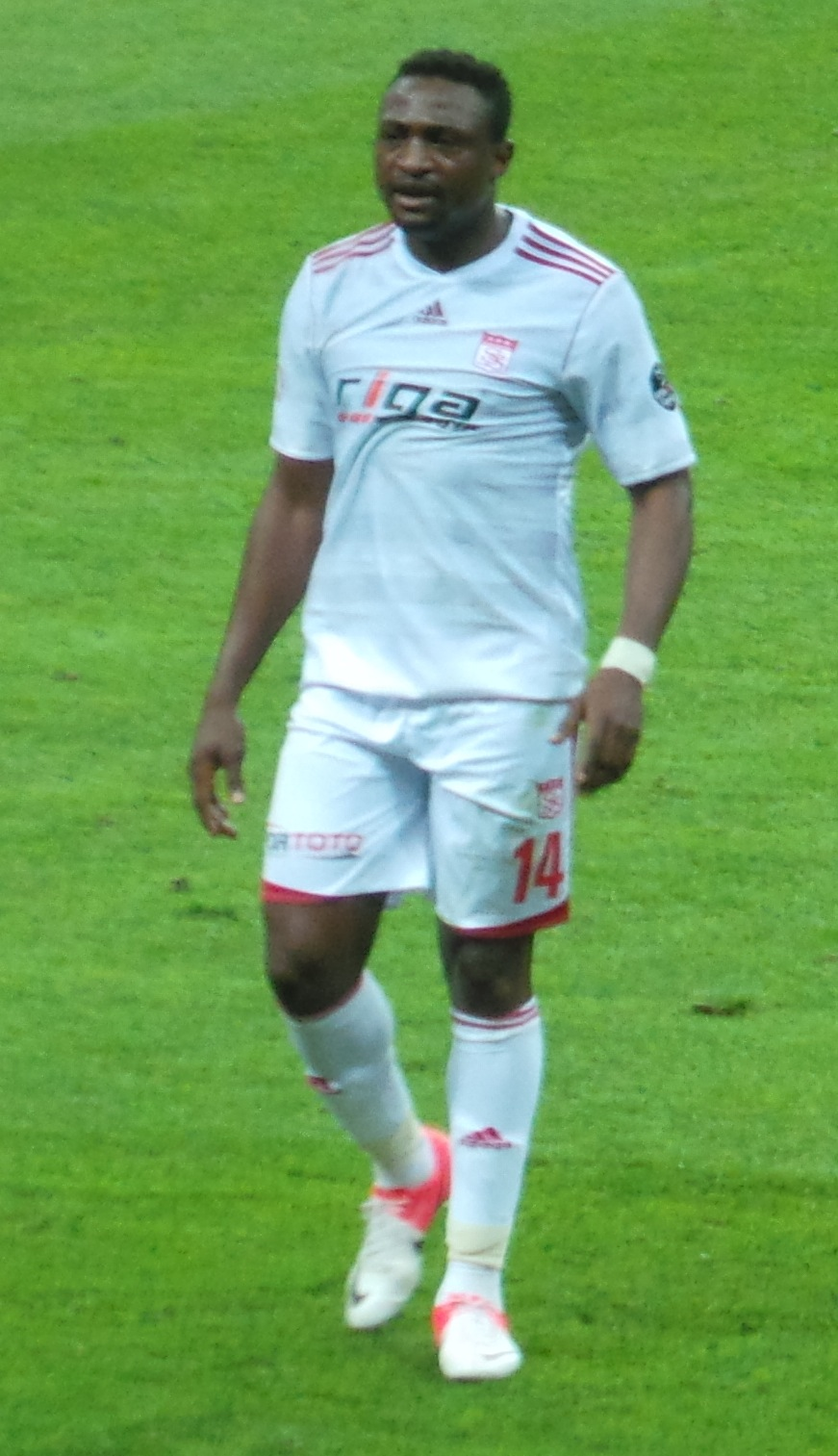
Michael Eneramo Although he played only one season In the form of loan but is considered one of the best foreign players in the Algerian league.

Name	Position	Inter career	Appearances	Goals	Clubs
Mohamed Manga	FW	1997–2000	?	?	USM Alger; USM Blida
Michael Eneramo	FW	2004–2006	24	13	USM Alger
Barnabas Imenger Jr.	FW	2017–present	0	0	MC Alger
Izu Azuka	FW	2008–2010	32	6	JS Kabylie
Effosa Eguakon	FW	2011	23	4	CS Constantine
Ogochukwu Obiakor	FW	2005	2	0	USM Blida
Onome Sodje	FW	2012–2013	13	1	CR Belouizdad
Isiaka Olawale	MF	2004–2006	36	3	WA Tlemcen
Uche Akubuike	GK	1999–2000	?	?	USM Blida
Francis Ikechukwu	FW	2014	0	0	ASO Chlef
Joshua Obaje	FW	2014–2015	13	1	ASO Chlef
Uche Nwofor	FW	2018–present	0	0	JS Kabylie

== Portugal ==
Name	Position	Inter career	Appearances	Goals	Clubs
Carlos António Gomes	GK	1969-1970	?	?	JS Djijel

== Senegal ==
Name	Position	Inter career	Appearances	Goals	Clubs
Pape Latyr N'Diaye	FW	2004-2006	29	6	ASO Chlef
Aissa Aidara	MF	1997-2004	?	?	WA Tlemcen
Elias M'Baye	MF	2014-2015	8	0	CS Constantine
Isla Daoudi Diomandé	MF	2018–present	0	0	ES Sétif
Elhadji Konaté	DF	2018–present	0	0	JS Saoura
Mohamed Waliou Ndoye	FW	2015-2016	24	9	MO Béjaïa
Moustapha Thiam	FW				USM Ain Beida; USM Blida

== Togo ==
Name	Position	Inter career	Appearances	Goals	Clubs
Sapol Mani	MF	2011–2013	32	1	CA Batna
Chérif Touré Mamam	MF	2007–2008	7	0	MC Alger
Souleymane Dicko	FW	2005	5	0	USM Blida

== Tunisia ==
Name	Position	Inter career	Appearances	Goals	Clubs
Saafi Boulbaba	DF	2011–2012	9	0	MC El Eulma
Oussama Darragi	MF	2020–present	0	0	JS Kabylie
Mejdi Mosrati	MF	2012–2014	50	5	CA Bordj Bou Arréridj
Hichem Essifi	FW	2012–2013	12	1	CA Bordj Bou Arréridj
Abdelwahab Lahmar	MF	1967–1969	?	?	USM Bel-Abbès
Hammadi Henia	FW	1965–1969	?	?	USM Bel-Abbès
Mohsen Henia	?	1965–196?	?	?	USM Blida
Mongi Haddad	?	1965–196?	?	?	USM Blida
Alaya Sassi	FW	1965–1967	?	?	USM Bel-Abbès
Mehdi Ouertani	MF	2015–present	13	0	NA Hussein Dey

== Uruguay ==
Name	Position	Inter career	Appearances	Goals	Clubs
Walter Pelletti	FW	2001–2002	1	0	ASM Oran

== Venezuela ==
Name	Position	Inter career	Appearances	Goals	Clubs
Wuiwel Isea	FW	2009	13	1	USM Alger

== Yugoslavia ==
Name	Position	Inter career	Appearances	Goals	Clubs
Markovic	GK	197?–197?	?	1	WA Tlemcen

== Foreign players with most appearances ==
This table shows the ranking of the foreign players with most appearances of Algerian Ligue Professionnelle 1 since 1999–2000.

- Bold Still playing in Algerian Ligue Professionnelle 1
- Last update: As of 26 May 2019

R.	Players	Clubs	Apps.	Goals	Years	Ref.
1	(Cameroon) Gilles Ngomo	AS Khroub, CS Constantine, CR Belouizdad	211	13	2008–16	
2	(Madagascar) Ibrahim Amada	JS Kabylie, AS Khroub, USM El Harrach, ES Sétif, MC Alger	170	13	2011–19	
3	(Madagascar) Carolus Andriamatsinoro	WA Tlemcen, USM Alger	128	26	2011–17	
4	(Mali) Moussa Coulibaly	MC Alger	119	7	2004–10	
5	(Mali) Soumaila Sidibe	MO Béjaïa, USM Alger, CR Belouizdad	111	1	2014–19	
6	(Burkina Faso) Jean-Michel Gnonka	RC Kouba, Paradou AC, AS Khroub	105	1	2000–04, 2006–09	
7	(Central African Republic) Eudes Dagoulou	MC Oran, ES Sétif	101	18	2011–16	
8	(Republic of the Congo) Wilfried Endzanga	JS Kabylie, USM Blida	100	21	2004–08	
9	(Mali) Mintou Doucoure	USM Alger, USM Annaba	96	8	2005–09	
10	(Ivory Coast) Madani Camara	MC El Eulma, JS Kabylie	91	1	2009–13	
11	(Cameroon) Jean Bapidi Fils	JS Saoura	88	6	2014–17	
12	(Cameroon) Francis Ambané	ES Sétif, ASO Chlef, WA Tlemcen	84	18	2008–13	

== Foreign players all-time top scorers ==
This table shows the ranking of the foreign players All-time top scorers of Algerian Ligue Professionnelle 1 since 1999–2000.

- Bold Still playing in Algerian Ligue Professionnelle 1
- Last update: As of 19 May 2018

R.	Players	Clubs	Goals	Apps.	Years	Ref.
1	(Cameroon) Yannick N'Djeng	JSM Béjaïa	32	77	2009–11	
2	(Cameroon) Jean Paul Yontcha	CA Bordj Bou Arréridj	28	65	2002–06	
2	(Madagascar) Carolus Andriamatsinoro	WA Tlemcen, USM Alger	26	128	2011–17	
3	(Cameroon) Albert Ebossé Bodjongo	JS Kabylie	21	41	2013–14	
4	(Republic of the Congo) Wilfried Endzanga	JS Kabylie, USM Blida	21	100	2004–08	
5	(Libya) Mohamed Zubya	JS Kabylie, MC Oran	20	43	2013–16	

== Number of players by country ==
- 33 Cameroon
- 30 Mali
- 17 Burkina Faso
- 13 Ivory Coast
- 11 Nigeria
- 8 Niger
- 7 Tunisia
- 6 Congo
- 5 Ghana, Mauritania, Senegal, Guinea, France
- 4 Gabon, Chad, Benin
- 3 Brazil, Congo DR, Libya, Madagascar
- 2 Togo, Morocco, Kenya
- 1 Venezuela, Burundi, Uruguay, Portugal, Liberia, Lesotho, Iraq, Gambia, Egypt, Djibouti, Central African Republic, Cape Verde, Bosnia-Herzegovina, Angola, Comoros, Yugoslavia
