= 2011–12 MC El Eulma season =

MC El Eulma
2011–12 season
- Chairman: Arras Herrada
- Head coach: Madjid Taleb (from ? July 2011) (until ? June 2012)
- Stadium: Stade Messaoud Zougar, El Eulma
- Ligue 1: 11th
- Algerian Cup: Round of 32
- Top goalscorer: League: Djamel Bouaïcha (11); All: Djamel Bouaïcha (12)

In the 2011–12 season, MC El Eulma is competing in the Ligue 1 for the 4th season, as well as the Algerian Cup. It is their 4th consecutive season in the top flight of Algerian football. They will be competing in Ligue 1, and the Algerian Cup.

== Squad list ==
Players and squad numbers last updated on 18 November 2011.
Note: Flags indicate national team as has been defined under FIFA eligibility rules. Players may hold more than one non-FIFA nationality.

No.	Nat.	Position	Name	Date of Birth (Age)	Signed from
Goalkeepers
Defenders
Midfielders
Forwards

== Competitions ==
=== Overview ===
Competition	Record								Started round	Final position / round	First match	Last match
Competition	G	W	D	L	GF	GA	GD	Win %	Started round	Final position / round	First match	Last match
Ligue 1	30	10	8	12	38	39	−1	33.33	—N/a	11th	10 September 2011	19 May 2012
Algerian Cup	2	1	0	1	7	1	+6	50.00	Round of 64	Round of 32	31 December 2011	25 February 2012
Total	32	11	8	13	45	40	+5	34.38				

Updated to match played 9 May 2018
Source: Competitions

== League table ==
Pos	Team	Pld	W	D	L	GF	GA	GD	Pts
9	JS Kabylie	30	10	11	9	29	23	+6	41
10	USM El Harrach	30	11	5	14	28	31	−3	38
11	MC El Eulma	30	10	8	12	38	39	−1	38
12	CS Constantine	30	8	12	10	35	42	−7	36
13	MC Oran	30	9	8	13	38	51	−13	35

Updated to match(es) played on 19 April 2018. Source: DZFoot
Rules for classification: 1) points; 2) head-to-head points; 3) head-to-head goal difference; 4) goal difference; 5) total goals; 6) fairplay ranking; 7) playoff.

=== Results summary ===
Overall								Home						Away					
Pld	W	D	L	GF	GA	GD	Pts	W	D	L	GF	GA	GD	W	D	L	GF	GA	GD
30	10	8	12	38	39	−1	38	8	4	3	24	14	+10	2	4	9	14	25	−11

Last updated: 29 December 2014.
Source: Competitive matches

=== Results by round ===
Round	1	2	3	4	5	6	7	8	9	10	11	12	13	14	15	16	17	18	19	20	21	22	23	24	25	26	27	28	29	30
Ground	A	H	A	H	A	H	A	H	A	H	A	H	A	H	A	H	A	H	A	H	A	H	A	H	A	H	A	H	A	H
Result	L	W	D	W	L	D	D	W	D	D	W	W	L	D	L	L	L	W	L	W	D	L	L	L	L	W	L	W	W	D
Position	15	8	8	5	8	8	8	7	9	8	8	4	7	7	9	9	10	10	10	9	10	11	11	11	12	11	12	12	11	11

Source: Competitive matches
A = Away; H = Home; W = Win; D = Draw; L = Loss

=== Matches ===
10 September 2011 Round 1	CR Belouizdad	2–0	MC El Eulma	Belouizdad
20:00	Kherbache 67'; Slimani 75'	Report		Stadium: Stade 20 Août 1955; Referee: Mohamed Sahraoui

17 September 2011 Round 2	MC El Eulma	3–1	WA Tlemcen	El Eulma
16:00	Bouaïcha 15', 65'; Tiaiba 17' (pen.)	Report	Sameur 45+3'	Stadium: Stade Messaoud Zougar; Referee: Farouk Houasnia

24 September 2011 Round 3	MC Oran	1–1	MC El Eulma	Oran
16:00	Feddal 88'	Report	Bouaïcha 10'	Stadium: Ahmed Zabana Stadium; Referee: Farouk Mial

1 October 2011 Round 4	MC El Eulma	2–1	USM Alger	El Eulma
16:00	Belakhdar 46'; Renane 90+3'	Report	72' (pen.) Djediat	Stadium: Stade Messaoud Zougar; Referee: Mohamed Benouza

15 October 2011 Round 5	MC Saïda	1–0	MC El Eulma	Saida
18:00	Madouni 35'	Report		Stadium: April 13, 1958 Stadium; Referee: Merzak Halalchi

22 October 2011 Round 6	MC El Eulma	1–1	JS Kabylie	El Eulma
16:00	Kadri 4'	Report	Rial 5'	Stadium: Stade Messaoud Zougar; Referee: Mohamed Babou

29 October 2011 Round 7	ES Sétif	1–1	MC El Eulma	Sétif
19:00	Djabou 73'	Report	Tiaïba 6'	Stadium: Stade 8 Mai 1945; Referee: Sofiane Bousseter

4 November 2011 Round 8	MC El Eulma	4–0	NA Hussein Dey	El Eulma
15:00	Belakhdar 9'; Bouaïcha 45+1', 66', 73'	Report		Stadium: Stade Messaoud Zougar; Referee: Mohamed Sahraoui

19 November 2011 Round 9	JSM Béjaïa	1–1	MC El Eulma	Béjaïa
18:00	Bachiri 21'	Report	Belakhdar 45+1'	Stadium: Stade de l'Unité Maghrébine; Referee: Boubekeur Zouaoui

22 November 2011 Round 10	MC El Eulma	1–1	ASO Chlef	El Eulma
15:00	Kadri 50'	Report	Ambané 44'	Stadium: Stade Messaoud Zougar; Referee: Mokhtar Amalou

26 November 2011 Round 11	CS Constantine	1–2	MC El Eulma	Constantine
15:00	Berchiche 19'	Report	Tiaiba 24'; Bouaïcha 35'	Stadium: Stade Mohamed Hamlaoui; Referee: Djamel Haimoudi

3 December 2011 Round 12	MC El Eulma	1–0	CA Batna	El Eulma
15:00	Hebbaïche 37'	Report		Stadium: Stade Messaoud Zougar; Referee: Farouk Houasnia

10 December 2011 Round 13	USM El Harrach	3–1	MC El Eulma	Algiers
15:00	Aïssaoui 41' (pen.); Benyettou 52'; Bounedjah 90+4'	Report	Gharbei 80'	Stadium: Stade 1er Novembre 1954; Referee: Mohamed Babou

17 December 2011 Round 14	MC El Eulma	1–1	AS Khroub	El Eulma
15:00	Belakhdar 34'	Report	Mesfar 49'	Stadium: Stade Messaoud Zougar; Referee: Merzak Halalchi

24 December 2011 Round 15	MC Alger	2–0	MC El Eulma	Algiers
18:00	Sayah 15'; Chaouchi 42' (pen.)	Report		Stadium: Stade 5 Juillet 1962; Referee: Farouk Houasnia

21 January 2012 Round 16	MC El Eulma	1–2	CR Belouizdad	El Eulma
15:00	Diarra 23'	Report	Benabderahmane 59'; Oudira 82'	Stadium: Stade Messaoud Zougar; Referee: Mohamed Amine Ghorbal

28 January 2012 Round 17	WA Tlemcen	2–0	MC El Eulma	Tlemcen
15:00	Sameur 47'; Andriamatsinoro 80'	Report		Stadium: Stade Akid Lotfi; Referee: Farouk Mial

28 February 2012 Round 18	MC El Eulma	3–0	MC Oran	El Eulma
15:00	Diarra 42'; Bouaïcha 59'; Tiaïba 90+3'	Report		Stadium: Stade Messaoud Zougar; Referee: Mohamed Bichari

4 February 2012 Round 19	USM Alger	1–0	MC El Eulma	Algiers
17:45	Meftah 45'	Report		Stadium: Stade Omar Hammadi; Referee: Saïd Aouina

18 February 2012 Round 20	MC El Eulma	1–0	MC Saïda	El Eulma
15:00	Diarra 36'	Report		Stadium: Stade Messaoud Zougar; Referee: Sofiane Bousseter

3 March 2012 Round 21	JS Kabylie	1–1	MC El Eulma	Tizi Ouzou
15:00	Belkalem 35'	Report	Berchiche 14'	Stadium: Stade du 1er Novembre 1954; Referee: Mohamed Saïdi

17 March 2012 Round 22	MC El Eulma	1–3	ES Sétif	El Eulma
15:00	Bouaïcha 42'	Report	Diss 49'; Benmoussa 70'; Ferrahi 79'	Stadium: Stade Messaoud Zougar; Referee: Mohamed Benouza

24 March 2012 Round 23	NA Hussein Dey	3–1	MC El Eulma	Hussein Dey
15:00	Ouhadda 43'; Zenou 61'; Derrardja 72'	Report	Belakhdar 19'	Stadium: Zioui Brothers Stadium; Referee: Youssef Zerrouki

31 March 2012 Round 24	MC El Eulma	1–2	JSM Béjaïa	El Eulma
15:00	Bouaïcha 67' (pen.)	Report	Zerara 56'; Boulaïnceur 88'	Stadium: Stade Messaoud Zougar; Attendance: 0 (close doors); Referee: Merzak Halalchi

14 April 2012 Round 25	ASO Chlef	2–0	MC El Eulma	Chlef
17:45	Hadji 25'; Messaoud 71'	Report		Stadium: Stade Mohamed Boumezrag; Referee: Mohamed Sahraoui

28 April 2012 Round 26	MC El Eulma	1–0	CS Constantine	El Eulma
15:00	Tiaïba 21'	Report		Stadium: Stade Messaoud Zougar; Referee: Boubekeur Zouaoui

5 May 2012 Round 27	CA Batna	3–1	MC El Eulma	Batna
15:00	Merazka 16'; El Hadi 53', 76'	Report	Bouaïcha 72'	Stadium: Mustapha Seffouhi Stadium; Referee: Mokhtar Amalou

28 May 2012 Round 28	MC El Eulma	1–0	USM El Harrach	El Eulma
15:00	Belakhdar 4'	Report		Stadium: Stade Messaoud Zougar; Referee: Mohamed Saïdi

15 May 2012 Round 29	AS Khroub	1–5	MC El Eulma	El Khroub
15:00	Belaïli 56'	Report	Tiaïba 42', 44'; Hebbaïche 45+5' (pen.); Bentayeb 73'; Kadri 90+3'	Stadium: Abed Hamdani Stadium; Referee: Sofiane Bousseter

19 May 2012 Round 30	MC El Eulma	2–2	MC Alger	El Eulma
18:00	Diarra 42'; Tiaïba 54'	Report	Djallit 53'; Sayoud 87'	Stadium: Stade Messaoud Zougar; Referee: Mohamed Sahraoui

== Algerian Cup ==
31 December 2011 Round of 64	MC El Eulma	7–0	CRB Ben Badis	El Eulma
14:00	Belakhdar 6'; Kadri 40', 83'; Bouaïcha 45' (pen.); Khattala 71'; Gharbei 77'; Tiaiba 90'	Report		Stadium: Stade Messaoud Zougar

25 February 2012 Round of 32	AS Khroub	1–0	MC El Eulma	El Khroub
15:00	Boudar 48'	Report		Stadium: Abed Hamdani Stadium; Referee: Redouane Necib

== Squad information ==
=== Playing statistics ===
No.	Pos	Nat	Player	Total		Ligue 1		Algerian Cup	
No.	Pos	Nat	Player	Apps	Goals	Apps	Goals	Apps	Goals
Goalkeepers
22	GK	(Algeria) ALG	Mourad Berrefane	26	0	26	0	0	0
16	GK	(Algeria) ALG	Antara Khattala	5	0	5	0	0	0
Defenders
19	DF	(Algeria) ALG	Abdenour Mahfoudhi	20	0	20	0	0	0
6	DF	(Algeria) ALG	Fayçal Hebbaïche	6	1	6	1	0	0
3	DF	(Algeria) ALG	Ishaq Benameur	3	0	3	0	0	0
4	DF	(Algeria) ALG	Koceila Berchiche	28	1	28	1	0	0
27	DF	(Tunisia) TUN	Saafi Boulbaba	9	0	9	0	0	0
2	DF	(Algeria) ALG	Badreddine Nezzar	10	0	10	0	0	0
5	DF	(Algeria) ALG	Adel Namane	5	0	5	0	0	0
Midfielders
	MF	(Algeria) ALG	Kamel Marek	2	0	2	0	0	0
14	MF	(Algeria) ALG	Mesbah Deghiche	17	0	17	0	0	0
	MF	(France) FRA	Adam Bouzid	10	0	10	0	0	0
18	MF	(Algeria) ALG	Messaoud Gharbei	27	1	27	1	0	0
17	MF	(Algeria) ALG	Fouad Renane	17	1	17	1	0	0
7	MF	(Algeria) ALG	Ismail Bentayeb	27	1	27	1	0	0
35	MF	(Algeria) ALG	El Almi Daoudi	9	0	9	0	0	0
10	MF	(Algeria) ALG	Nacer Hammami	21	0	21	0	0	0
24	MF	(Algeria) ALG	Ibrahim Chenihi	5	0	5	0	0	0
13	MF	(Algeria) ALG	Fethi Benameur	7	0	7	0	0	0
	MF	(Algeria) ALG	Izzeddine Noura	2	0	2	0	0	0
Forwards
9	FW	(Algeria) ALG	Mohamed Tiaiba	27	8	27	8	0	0
11	FW	(Algeria) ALG	Ali Lamine Kab	10	0	10	0	0	0
25	FW	(Burkina Faso) BFA	Abderrahmane Diarra	10	4	10	4	0	0
12	FW	(Algeria) ALG	Younès Kadri	27	3	27	3	0	0
20	FW	(Algeria) ALG	Omar Bellagra	3	0	3	0	0	0
21	FW	(Algeria) ALG	Djamel Bouaïcha	28	11	28	11	0	0
15	FW	(Algeria) ALG	Faycal Belakhdar	28	6	28	6	0	0
Players transferred out during the season

Last updated: 30 November 2017
Source: fr.soccerway.com

== Transfers ==
=== In ===
Date	Pos	Player	From club	Transfer fee	Source
1 July 2011	GK	(Algeria) Moustapha Zeghba	WRB M'Sila	Free transfer	
1 July 2011	DF	(Tunisia) Saafi Boulbaba	(Tunisia) AS Kasserine	Free transfer	
1 July 2011	DF	(Algeria) Ishaq Benameur	WRB M'Sila	Free transfer	
1 July 2011	DF	(Algeria) Adel Namane	ESM Koléa	Free transfer	
1 July 2011	MF	(Algeria) (France) Adam Bouzid	(England) Southend United	Free transfer	
1 July 2011	MF	(Algeria) Ismail Bentayeb	ASO Chlef	Free transfer	
1 July 2011	MF	(Algeria) Messaoud Gharbei	USM El Harrach	Free transfer	
1 July 2011	MF	(Algeria) Fethi Benameur	WRB M'Sila	Free transfer	
1 July 2011	MF	(Algeria) Ibrahim Chenihi	WRB M'Sila	Free transfer	
1 July 2011	FW	(Burkina Faso) Abderrahmane Diarra	(Portugal) Tourizense	Free transfer	
1 July 2011	FW	(Algeria) Omar Bellagra	AS Khroub	Free transfer	
4 August 2011	GK	(Algeria) Mourad Berrefane	JS Kabylie	Free transfer	
16 August 2011	DF	(Algeria) Koceila Berchiche	JS Kabylie	Free transfer	
22 August 2011	FW	(Algeria) Djamel Bouaïcha	USM Annaba	Free transfer	
12 January 2012	MF	(Algeria) El Almi Daoudi	MC Alger	Free transfer	

=== Out ===
Date	Pos	Player	To club	Transfer fee	Source
27 June 2011	MF	(Ivory Coast) Madani Camara	JS Kabylie	Free transfer	
5 July 2011	FW	(Algeria) Hamza Boulemdaïs	JS Kabylie	Free transfer	
