= 2011–12 CS Constantine season =

CS Constantine
2011–12 season
- Chairman: Mohamed Boulhabib
- Head coach: José Dutra dos Santos (until 14 September 2012); Rachid Bouarrata (from 27 September 2012} (until 29 January 2012} Rachid Belhout (from 10 February 2012}
- Stadium: Stade Mohamed Hamlaoui
- Ligue 1: 12th
- Algerian Cup: Semi-final
- Top goalscorer: League: Fouad Bouguerra (6); All: Fouad Bouguerra (8)

In the 2011–12 season, CS Constantine competed in the Ligue 1 for the 16th season, as well as the Algerian Cup.

== Squad list ==
Players and squad numbers last updated on 18 November 2011.
Note: Flags indicate national team as has been defined under FIFA eligibility rules. Players may hold more than one non-FIFA nationality.

No.	Nat.	Position	Name	Date of birth (age)	Signed from
Goalkeepers
Defenders
Midfielders
Forwards

== Competitions ==
=== Overview ===
Competition	Record								Started round	Final position / round	First match	Last match
Competition	G	W	D	L	GF	GA	GD	Win %	Started round	Final position / round	First match	Last match
Ligue 1	30	8	12	10	35	42	−7	26.67	—N/a	13th	10 September 2011	19 May 2012
Algerian Cup	5	3	1	1	7	3	+4	60.00	Round of 64	Semi-final	30 December 2011	20 April 2012
Total	35	11	13	11	42	45	−3	31.43				

Updated to match played 9 May 2017
Source: Competitions

== League table ==
Pos	Team	Pld	W	D	L	GF	GA	GD	Pts	Qualification or relegation
10	USM El Harrach	30	11	5	14	28	31	−3	38	
11	MC El Eulma	30	10	8	12	38	39	−1	38	
12	CS Constantine	30	8	12	10	35	42	−7	36	
13	MC Oran	30	9	8	13	38	51	−13	35	
14	AS Khroub (R)	30	7	10	13	23	46	−23	31	Relegation to Ligue Professionnelle 2

Updated to match(es) played on 19 April 2018. Source: DZFoot
Rules for classification: 1) points; 2) head-to-head points; 3) head-to-head goal difference; 4) goal difference; 5) total goals; 6) fairplay ranking; 7) playoff.
(R) Relegated

=== Results summary ===
Overall								Home						Away					
Pld	W	D	L	GF	GA	GD	Pts	W	D	L	GF	GA	GD	W	D	L	GF	GA	GD
30	8	12	10	35	42	−7	36	7	6	2	24	17	+7	1	6	8	11	25	−14

Last updated: 29 December 2014.
Source: Competitive matches

=== Results by round ===
Round	1	2	3	4	5	6	7	8	9	10	11	12	13	14	15	16	17	18	19	20	21	22	23	24	25	26	27	28	29	30
Ground																														
Result																														
Position																														

Source: Competitive matches
A = Away; H = Home; W = Win; D = Draw; L = Loss

=== Matches ===
10 September 2011 Round 1	CS Constantine	0–0	JSM Béjaïa	Constantine
19:00		Report		Stadium: Stade Mohamed Hamlaoui; Referee: Boubekeur Zouaoui

17 September 2011 Round 2	ASO Chlef	3–1	CS Constantine	Chlef
19:00	Seguer 25', 41', 56'	Report	Djillali 79'	Stadium: Stade Mohamed Boumezrag; Referee: Bouaza Chenane

24 September 2011 Round 3	CS Constantine	1–0	MC Alger	Constantine
18:00	Benhadj Djillali 70'	Report		Stadium: Stade Mohamed Hamlaoui; Referee: Mohamed Benouza

1 October 2011 Round 4	CA Batna	0–0	CS Constantine	Batna
18:00		Report		Stadium: Mustapha Seffouhi Stadium; Referee: Mokhtar Amalou

15 October 2011 Round 5	CS Constantine	4–1	USM El Harrach	Constantine
16:00	Bouguerra 20'; Griche 25' (o.g.); Zmit 31'; Djillali 83'	Report	Griche 5'	Stadium: Stade Mohamed Hamlaoui; Referee: Mohamed Sahraoui

22 October 2011 Round 6	MC Oran	2–1	CS Constantine	Oran
16:00	El Bahari 21'; Aouedj 75'	Report	Hadjadj 88'	Stadium: Ahmed Zabana Stadium; Referee: Mohamed Bichari

29 October 2011 Round 7	CS Constantine	2–1	AS Khroub	Constantine
17:00	Dahmane 42', 59'	Report	Amada 65'	Stadium: Stade Mohamed Hamlaoui; Referee: Merzak Halalchi

5 November 2011 Round 8	USM Alger	1–1	CS Constantine	Algiers
18:00	Bouchema 63'	Report	Ngomo 76'	Stadium: Stade Omar Hammadi; Attendance: Behind closed doors Referee: Ghodbane

19 November 2011 Round 9	CS Constantine	1–1	WA Tlemcen	Constantine
15:00	Djillali 6'	Report	Sidhoum 58'	Stadium: Stade Mohamed Hamlaoui; Referee: Said Aouina

22 November 2011 Round 10	JS Kabylie	1–0	CS Constantine	Tizi Ouzou
15:00	Tedjar 84' (pen.)	Report		Stadium: Stade du 1er Novembre 1954; Referee: Sofiane Bousseter

26 November 2011 Round 11	CS Constantine	1–2	MC El Eulma	Constantine
15:00	Berchiche 19' (o.g.)	Report	Tiaiba 24'; Bouaïcha 35'	Stadium: Stade Mohamed Hamlaoui; Referee: Djamel Haimoudi

3 December 2011 Round 12	MC Saïda	1–1	CS Constantine	Saida
15:00	Sayah 36'	Report	Mekkaoui 55'	Stadium: April 13, 1958 Stadium; Referee: Mokhtar Amalou

10 December 2011 Round 13	CS Constantine	0–0	CR Belouizdad	Constantine
15:00		Report		Stadium: Stade Mohamed Hamlaoui; Referee: Mohamed Benouza

17 December 2011 Round 14	CS Constantine	3–2	ES Sétif	Constantine
15:00	Eguakun 11'; Dahmane 53' (pen.), 55'	Report	Aoudia 66', 76'	Stadium: Stade Mohamed Hamlaoui; Referee: Redouane Necib

24 December 2011 Round 15	NA Hussein Dey	0–0	CS Constantine	Hussein Dey
15:00		Report		Stadium: Zioui Brothers Stadium; Referee: Mohamed Sahraoui

21 January 2012 Round 16	JSM Béjaïa	3–0	CS Constantine	Béjaïa
15:00	Gasmi 49', 66'; Belakhdar 88'	Report		Stadium: Stade de l'Unité Maghrébine; Referee: Mohamed Bichari

28 January 2012 Round 17	CS Constantine	1–3	ASO Chlef	Constantine
15:00	Ziti 11'	Report	Oussalé 53' (pen.); Gharbi 61'; Messaoud 82'	Stadium: Stade Mohamed Hamlaoui; Referee: Mokhtar Amalou

31 January 2012 Round 18	MC Alger	2–2	CS Constantine	Algiers
17:45	Sayah 16', 70'	Report	Eguakun 76'; Lemaici 90+6'	Stadium: Stade 5 Juillet 1962; Referee: Mohamed Sahraoui

14 February 2012 Round 19	CS Constantine	2–1	CA Batna	Constantine
15:00	Ferhat 46'; Ngomo 49'	Report	Amrane 13'	Stadium: Stade Mohamed Hamlaoui; Referee: Mohamed Saïdi

18 February 2012 Round 20	USM El Harrach	0–1	CS Constantine	Algiers
15:00		Report	Ziti 3'	Stadium: Stade 1er Novembre 1954; Referee: Mohamed Amine Ghorbal

3 March 2012 Round 21	CS Constantine	3–1	MC Oran	Constantine
15:00	Bezzaz 8'; Naït Yahia 22', 48'	Report	Belaïli 63'	Stadium: Stade Mohamed Hamlaoui; Referee: Farouk Mial

17 March 2012 Round 22	AS Khroub	3–0	CS Constantine	El Khroub
15:00	Mesfar 26' (pen.), 80'; Belaïli 51'	Report		Stadium: Abed Hamdani Stadium; Referee: Bouaza Chenane

24 March 2012 Round 23	CS Constantine	1–1	USM Alger	Constantine
15:00	Behloul 90+5'	Report	90+4' (pen.) Meklouche	Stadium: Stade Mohamed Hamlaoui; Referee: Mohamed Benouza

7 April 2012 Round 24	WA Tlemcen	4–2	CS Constantine	Tlemcen
15:00	Boudjakdji 27'; Andria 60', 66' (pen.); Sameur 63'	Report	Bouguerra 39', 88' (pen.)	Stadium: Stade Akid Lotfi; Referee: Farouk Mial

14 April 2012 Round 25	CS Constantine	0–0	JS Kabylie	Constantine
16:00		Report		Stadium: Stade Mohamed Hamlaoui; Attendance: 0 (close doors); Referee: Redouane Necib

28 April 2012 Round 26	MC El Eulma	1–0	CS Constantine	El Eulma
15:00	Tiaïba 21'	Report		Stadium: Stade Messaoud Zougar; Referee: Boubekeur Zouaoui

5 May 2012 Round 27	CS Constantine	2–1	MC Saïda	Constantine
15:00	Eguakun 41'; Bezzaz 49' (pen.)	Report	Saâdi 32'	Stadium: Stade Mohamed Hamlaoui; Referee: Merzak Halalchi

8 May 2012 Round 28	CR Belouizdad	0–0	CS Constantine	Belouizdad
16:00		Report		Stadium: Stade 20 Août 1955; Referee: Mohamed Sahraoui

15 May 2012 Round 29	ES Sétif	4–2	CS Constantine	Sétif
18:00	Lemaici 51' (o.g.); Benmoussa 64' (pen.); Djabou 70'; Ndaney 84'	Report	Dahmane 33'; Bouguerra 90+2'	Stadium: Stade 8 Mai 1945; Referee: Youssef Zerrouki

19 May 2012 Round 30	CS Constantine	3–3	NA Hussein Dey	Constantine
15:00	Bouguerra 34', 44'; Eguakun 77'	Report	Derrardja 9'; Lahlou 13'; Ouhadda 31'	Stadium: Stade Mohamed Hamlaoui; Referee: Mohamed Saïdi

== Algerian Cup ==
30 December 2011 Round of 64	CA Batna	1–1 (a.e.t.) (3–4 p)	CS Constantine	Batna
14:30	Lemaici 42' (o.g.)	Report	Ziti 88' (pen.)	Stadium: November 1, 1954 Stadium; Referee: Merzak Halalchi

24 February 2012 Round of 32	CS Constantine	3–1 (a.e.t.)	Olympique de Médéa	Constantine
15:00	Bouguerra 77', 101'; Eguakun 120'	Report	Sahraoui 84'	Stadium: Stade Mohamed Hamlaoui; Referee: Merzoug Brahimi

9 March 2012 Round of 16	CS Constantine	2–0	AS Khroub	Constantine
15:00	Hadjadj 52'; Bezzaz 82'	Report		Stadium: Stade Mohamed Hamlaoui; Referee: Mokhtar Amalou

30 March 2012 Quarter-finals	WA Tlemcen	0–1 (a.e.t.)	CS Constantine	Tlemcen
16:00		Report	Ziti 105'	Stadium: Stade Akid Lotfi; Referee: Mohamed Bichari

20 April 2012 Semi-finals	CR Belouizdad	1–0	CS Constantine	Algiers
16:00	Rebih 58'	Report		Stadium: Stade 20 Août 1955; Referee: Mustapha Ghorbal

== Squad information ==
=== Playing statistics ===
No.	Pos	Nat	Player	Total		Ligue 1		Algerian Cup	
No.	Pos	Nat	Player	Apps	Goals	Apps	Goals	Apps	Goals
Goalkeepers
18	GK	(Algeria) ALG	Samir Hadjaoui	1	0	1	0	0	0
30	GK	(Algeria) ALG	Cyrille Boukhit	1	0	1	0	0	0
1	GK	(Algeria) ALG	Amara Daïf	26	0	26	0	0	0
19	GK	(Algeria) ALG	Sofiane Kaouane	2	0	2	0	0	0
Defenders
	DF	(Algeria) ALG	Nordine Sam	4	0	4	0	0	0
87	DF	(Algeria) ALG	Zineddine Mekkaoui	26	1	26	1	0	0
25	DF	(Algeria) ALG	Nacerdine Bensaci	9	0	9	0	0	0
5	DF	(Algeria) ALG	Adel Messali	22	0	22	0	0	0
33	DF	(Algeria) ALG	Mohamed Khoutir Ziti	20	2	20	2	0	0
15	DF	(Algeria) ALG	Abderrahmane Lemaici	16	1	16	1	0	0
Midfielders
4	MF	(Algeria) ALG	Yazid Mansouri	8	0	8	0	0	0
77	MF	(Algeria) ALG	Yacine Bezzaz	13	2	13	2	0	0
10	MF	(Algeria) ALG	Fodil Hadjadj	20	1	20	1	0	0
17	MF	(Algeria) ALG	Reda Benhadj Djillali	11	3	11	3	0	0
24	MF	(Algeria) ALG	Zoubir Zmit	27	1	27	1	0	0
6	MF	(Cameroon) CMR	Gilles Ngomo	27	2	27	2	0	0
8	MF	(Algeria) ALG	Karim Naït Yahia	16	2	16	2	0	0
7	MF	(Algeria) ALG	Ayoub Ferhat	20	1	20	1	0	0
14	MF	(Algeria) ALG	Bilal Bahloul	25	1	25	1	0	0
22	MF	(Algeria) ALG	Youcef Erroukrma	8	0	8	0	0	0
21	MF	(Algeria) ALG	Yahia Djilali	19	1	19	1	0	0
Forwards
28	FW	(Algeria) ALG	Mohamed Dahmane	19	5	19	5	0	0
47	FW	(Algeria) ALG	Safi Belghomari	5	0	5	0	0	0
26	FW	(Algeria) ALG	Fouad Bouguerra	20	6	20	6	0	0
27	FW	(Nigeria) NGR	Efosa Eguakun	23	4	23	4	0	0
20	FW	(Algeria) ALG	Abdelmoutaleb Ghodbane	6	0	6	0	0	0
9	FW	(Algeria) ALG	Farès Cheniguer	5	0	5	0	0	0
13	FW	(Algeria) ALG	Mekhlouf Keffi	10	0	10	0	0	0
	FW	(Algeria) ALG	Oussama Ziane	1	0	1	0	0	0
Players transferred out during the season

Last updated: 30 November 2017
Source: fr.soccerway.com

=== Goalscorers ===
Includes all competitive matches. The list is sorted alphabetically by surname when total goals are equal.

No.	Nat.	Player	Pos.	L 1	AC	TOTAL
26	(Algeria)	Fouad Bouguerra	FW	6	2	8
28	(Algeria)	Mohamed Dahmane	FW	5	0	5
27	(Nigeria)	Efosa Eguakun	FW	4	1	5
33	(Algeria)	Mohamed Khoutir Ziti	DF	2	2	4
17	(Algeria)	Reda Benhadj Djillali	MF	3	0	3
77	(Algeria)	Yacine Bezzaz	MF	2	1	3
6	(Cameroon)	Gilles Ngomo	MF	2	0	2
8	(Algeria)	Karim Naït Yahia	MF	2	0	2
10	(Algeria)	Fodil Hadjadj	MF	1	1	2
24	(Algeria)	Zoubir Zmit	MF	1	0	1
7	(Algeria)	Ayoub Ferhat	MF	1	0	1
14	(Algeria)	Bilal Bahloul	MF	1	0	1
21	(Algeria)	Yahia Djilali	MF	1	0	1
87	(Algeria)	Zineddine Mekkaoui	DF	1	0	1
15	(Algeria)	Abderrahmane Lemaici	DF	1	0	1
Own Goals				2	0	2
Totals				35	7	42

== Transfers ==
=== In ===
Date	Pos	Player	From club	Transfer fee	Source
1 July 2011	GK	(Algeria) Sofiane Kaouane	AB Mérouana	Free transfer	
1 July 2011	GK	(Algeria) (France) Cyrille Boukhit	(France) Rodez AF	Free transfer	
1 July 2011	DF	(Algeria) Adel Messali	MC El Eulma	Free transfer	
1 July 2011	DF	(Algeria) Zineddine Mekkaoui	USM Annaba	Free transfer	
1 July 2011	DF	(Algeria) Nordine Sam	(Libya) Al-Nasr Benghazi	€145,000	
1 July 2011	DF	(Algeria) Mohamed Khoutir Ziti	JS Kabylie	Free transfer	
1 July 2011	MF	(Algeria) Youcef Erroukrma	WA Rouiba	Free transfer	
1 July 2011	MF	(Algeria) Reda Benhadj Djillali	(Saudi Arabia) Najran	Loan Return	
1 July 2011	MF	(Algeria) Karim Naït Yahia	AS Khroub	Free transfer	
1 July 2011	MF	(Algeria) Bilal Bahloul	CA Batna	Free transfer	
1 July 2011	FW	(Algeria) Safi Belghomari	USM Bel Abbès	Free transfer	
10 July 2011	MF	(Algeria) Ayoub Ferhat	MO Constantine	Free transfer	
1 August 2011	GK	(Algeria) Samir Hadjaoui	WA Tlemcen	Free transfer	
1 August 2011	FW	(Algeria) Mohamed Dahmane	(Belgium) Eupen	Free transfer	
8 August 2011	MF	(Cameroon) Gilles Ngomo	AS Khroub	Free transfer	
17 August 2011	FW	(Nigeria) Efosa Eguakun	(Sudan) Al Hilal Club	Free transfer	
17 August 2011	FW	(Algeria) Fouad Bouguerra	(Hungary) Győri ETO FC	Loan	
23 December 2011	MF	(Algeria) Yazid Mansouri	(Qatar) Al-Sailiya	Free transfer	
18 January 2012	MF	(Algeria) Yacine Bezzaz	USM Alger	Free transfer	

=== Out ===
Date	Pos	Player	To club	Transfer fee	Source
1 January 2012	FW	(Algeria) Fayçal Oudira	CR Belouizdad	Undisclosed	
