= 2010–11 MC El Eulma season =

MC El Eulma
2010–11 season
- Chairman: Arras Herrada
- Head coach: Hakim Malek (until 24 December 2010); Abdelkrim Bira (from 25 December 2010)
- Stadium: Stade Messaoud Zougar
- Ligue 1: 13th
- Algerian Cup: Round of 16
- Top goalscorer: League: Hamza Boulemdaïs (11 goal); All: Hamza Boulemdaïs (11 goal)

In the 2010–11 season, MC El Eulma is competing in the Ligue 1 for the 3rd season, as well as the Algerian Cup. It is their 3rd consecutive season in the top flight of Algerian football. They will be competing in Ligue 1, and the Algerian Cup.

== Squad list ==
Players and squad numbers last updated on 18 November 2010.
Note: Flags indicate national team as has been defined under FIFA eligibility rules. Players may hold more than one non-FIFA nationality.

No.	Nat.	Position	Name	Date of birth (age)	Signed from
Goalkeepers
1	(Algeria)	GK	Salah Sahraoui	28 March 1984 (aged 26)	(Algeria) MSP Batna
16	(Algeria)	GK	Antara Khattala	12 May 1990 (aged 20)	(Algeria) Youth system
19	(Algeria)	GK	Abderrahmane Boutrig	10 December 1980 (aged 30)	(Algeria) USM El Harrach
Defenders
	(Algeria)	RB	Abdenour Mahfoudhi	21 April 1980 (aged 30)	(Algeria) ES Sétif
5	(Algeria)	CB	Adel Messali	31 July 1983 (aged 27)	(Algeria) JSM Béjaïa
2	(Algeria)	RB	Adel Bouaraba	11 April 1985 (aged 25)	(Algeria) MSP Batna
	(Algeria)	AM	Rachid Mehia	17 May 1983 (aged 27)	(Algeria) JSM Béjaïa
3	(Algeria)	LB	Marek Amiri	24 February 1987 (aged 23)	(France) US Marseille Endoume
Midfielders
6	(Algeria)	DM	Reda Benhadj Djillali	31 May 1978 (aged 32)	(Algeria) USM Annaba
	(Algeria)	MF	Mesbah Deghiche	30 March 1981 (aged 29)	(Algeria) JSM Béjaïa
14	(Algeria)	DM	Amir Karaoui	3 August 1987 (aged 23)	(France) USB Longwy
11	(Algeria)	MF	Fouad Renane	28 April 1985 (aged 25)	(Algeria) Youth system
17	(Algeria)	DM	Nourredine Abdellaoui	13 November 1983 (aged 27)	(Algeria) WA Tlemcen
8	(Algeria)	MF	Nacer Hammami	28 December 1980 (aged 30)	(Algeria) USM Annaba
12	(Ivory Coast)	CM	Madani Camara	30 March 1987 (aged 23)	(Ivory Coast) Vallée Bouaké
13	(Algeria)	MF	Samir Machach	9 July 1981 (aged 29)	(France) US Marseille Endoume
Forwards
23	(Algeria)	FW	Djabir Naamoune	5 April 1987 (aged 23)	(Algeria) AS Khroub
	(Algeria)	FW	Mohamed Tiaiba	26 July 1988 (aged 22)	(Algeria) USM Sétif
20	(Algeria)	FW	Toufik Benamokrane	22 March 1980 (aged 30)	(Algeria) MSP Batna
9	(Algeria)	FW	Hamza Boulemdaïs	22 November 1982 (aged 28)	(Algeria) JSM Béjaïa
	(Algeria)	FW	Ali Lamine Kab	11 March 1985 (aged 25)	(Algeria) CA Bordj Bou Arreridj
7	(Algeria)	FW	Abdelmoutaleb Ghodbane	9 July 1989 (aged 21)	(Algeria) CA Batna
	(Algeria)	FW	Younès Kadri	4 January 1991 (aged 19)	(Algeria) ES Sétif
21	(Algeria)	FW	Hamza Medjahed	28 July 1984 (aged 26)	(Algeria) Youth system
15	(Algeria)	FW	Faycal Belakhdar	10 October 1985 (aged 25)	(Algeria) WA Boufarik
	(Algeria)	FW	Abdelmalek Abbes	11 February 1991 (aged 19)	(Algeria) Youth system

== Competitions ==
=== Overview ===
Competition	Record								Started round	Final position / round	First match	Last match
Competition	G	W	D	L	GF	GA	GD	Win %	Started round	Final position / round	First match	Last match
Ligue 1	30	9	9	12	32	40	−8	30.00	—N/a	13th	25 September 2010	8 July 2011
Algerian Cup	3	2	0	1	5	2	+3	66.67	Round of 64	Round of 16	31 December 2010	15 March 2011
Total	33	11	9	13	37	42	−5	33.33				

Updated to match played 9 May 2017
Source: Competitions

== League table ==
Pos	Team	Pld	W	D	L	GF	GA	GD	Pts	Qualification or relegation
11	JS Kabylie	30	10	7	13	26	37	−11	37	
12	WA Tlemcen	30	10	7	13	35	36	−1	37	
13	MC El Eulma	30	9	9	12	32	40	−8	36	
14	USM Annaba (R)	30	10	6	14	23	34	−11	36	Relegation to Ligue Professionnelle 2
15	CA Bordj Bou Arreridj (R)	30	8	5	17	21	46	−25	29	Relegation to Ligue Professionnelle 2

Updated to match(es) played on 19 April 2018. Source: DZFoot
Rules for classification: 1) points; 2) head-to-head points; 3) head-to-head goal difference; 4) goal difference; 5) total goals; 6) fairplay ranking; 7) playoff.
(R) Relegated

=== Results summary ===
Overall								Home						Away					
Pld	W	D	L	GF	GA	GD	Pts	W	D	L	GF	GA	GD	W	D	L	GF	GA	GD
30	9	9	12	32	40	−8	36	9	3	3	22	11	+11	0	6	9	10	29	−19

Last updated: 29 December 2014.
Source: Competitive matches

=== Results by round ===
Round	1	2	3	4	5	6	7	8	9	10	11	12	13	14	15	16	17	18	19	20	21	22	23	24	25	26	27	28	29	30
Ground	H	A	H	A	H	A	H	A	H	A	H	A	H	A	H	A	H	A	H	A	H	A	H	A	H	A	H	A	H	A
Result	W	L	W	L	W	D	L	L	W	L	D	L	W	L	W	L	D	D	L	D	W	L	D	D	L	W	W	D	W	D
Position	7	8	4	9	6	6	8	10	9	10	10	10	9	10	9	9	9	9	9	10	9	9	9	10	13	14	13	13	13	13

Source: Competitive matches
A = Away; H = Home; W = Win; D = Draw; L = Loss

=== Matches ===
Win Draw Loss

25 September 2010 Round 1	MC El Eulma	1–0	MC Alger	El Eulma
17:00	Karaoui 7'	Soccerway report		Stadium: Stade Messaoud Zougar; Referee: Kadda Babrahim

2 October 2010 Round 2	CR Belouizdad	3–1	MC El Eulma	Belouizdad
17:00	Rebih 14'; Bourakba 73', 87'	Soccerway report	Aksas 54' (o.g.)	Stadium: Stade 20 Août 1955; Referee: Mohamed Benouza

16 October 2010 Round 3	MC El Eulma	2–1	AS Khroub	El Eulma
17:00	Boulemdaïs 34'; Ghodbane 90'	Soccerway report	Leghzal 64'	Stadium: Stade Messaoud Zougar; Referee: Redouane Necib

22 October 2010 Round 4	ASO Chlef	5–0	MC El Eulma	Chlef
20:00	Soudani 34', 68', 87'; Seguer 80'; Djediat 90' (pen.)	Soccerway report		Stadium: Stade Mohamed Boumezrag; Referee: Ali Bouali

26 October 2010 Round 5	MC El Eulma	1–0	MC Oran	El Eulma
17:00	Kadri 75'	Soccerway report		Stadium: Stade Messaoud Zougar; Referee: Farid Bahloul

29 October 2010 Round 6	USM Annaba	0–0	MC El Eulma	Annaba
19:00		Soccerway report		Stadium: May 19, 1956 Stadium; Referee: Abdelkader Karabi

6 November 2010 Round 7	MC El Eulma	0–1	ES Sétif	El Eulma
14:30		Soccerway report	Hachoud 5'	Stadium: Stade Messaoud Zougar; Referee: Mokhtar Amalou

13 November 2010 Round 8	USM Alger	2–0	MC El Eulma	Bologhine
14:30	Aouamri 70', 80'	Soccerway report		Stadium: Omar Hamadi Stadium; Referee: Mohamed Bouhenni

27 November 2010 Round 9	MC El Eulma	2–0	CA Bordj Bou Arreridj	El Eulma
14:30	Benamokrane 40'; Boulemdaïs 50' (pen.)	Soccerway report		Stadium: Stade Messaoud Zougar; Referee: Redouane Necib

3 December 2010 Round 10	JSM Béjaïa	5–2	MC El Eulma	Béjaïa
18:00	Gasmi 1', 11'; Zerdab 23'; N'Djeng 31' (pen.); Megateli 37'	Soccerway report	Djillali 48'; Benamokrane 82'	Stadium: Stade de l'Unité Maghrébine; Referee: Mohamed Haddada

11 December 2010 Round 11	MC El Eulma	0–0	WA Tlemcen	El Eulma
14:30		Soccerway report		Stadium: Stade Messaoud Zougar; Referee: Farouk Mial

18 December 2010 Round 12	MC Saïda	1–0	MC El Eulma	Saida
14:30	Madouni 5'	Soccerway report		Stadium: April 13, 1958 Stadium; Referee: Kadda Babrahim

24 December 2010 Round 13	MC El Eulma	1–0	USM Blida	El Eulma
15:00	Mehia 20'	Soccerway report		Stadium: Stade Messaoud Zougar; Referee: Djamel Haimoudi

19 February 2011 Round 14	JS Kabylie	3–2	MC El Eulma	Tizi Ouzou
14:30	Hamiti 9'; Rial 52'; Younès 73'	Soccerway report	Benamokrane 51'; Boulemdaïs 56'	Stadium: Stade 1er Novembre 1954; Referee: Redouane Necib

26 February 2011 Round 15	MC El Eulma	3–0	USM El Harrach	El Eulma
14:30	Boulemdaïs 50', 68', 78' (pen.)	Soccerway report		Stadium: Stade Messaoud Zougar; Referee: Mohamed Benouza

26 February 2011 Round 16	MC Alger	3–1	MC El Eulma	Rouïba
14:30	Mokdad 12' (pen.), 77'; Daoudi 24'	Soccerway report	Tiaïba 15'	Stadium: Stade Mabrouki Salem; Referee: Mohamed Bouhenni

29 March 2011 Round 17	MC El Eulma	0–0	CR Belouizdad	El Eulma
15:30		Soccerway report		Stadium: Stade Messaoud Zougar; Referee: Farouk Mial

2 April 2011 Round 18	AS Khroub	0–0	MC El Eulma	El Khroub
15:30		Soccerway report		Stadium: Stade Abed Hamdani; Referee: Mehdi Abid Charef

15 April 2011 Round 19	MC El Eulma	2–4	ASO Chlef	El Eulma
17:00	Camara 33'; Boulemdaïs 48'	Soccerway report	Messaoud 6'; Hebbaïche 16' (o.g.); Soudani 25'; Djediat 67'	Stadium: Stade Messaoud Zougar; Referee: Sofiane Bousseter

25 April 2011 Round 20	MC Oran	1–1	MC El Eulma	Oran
17:00	El Bahari 48'	Soccerway report	Tiaïba 2'	Stadium: Ahmed Zabana Stadium; Referee: Merzak Halalchi

7 May 2011 Round 21	MC El Eulma	2–0	USM Annaba	El Eulma
17:00	Karaoui 47'; Tiaiba 90+2'	Soccerway report		Stadium: Stade Messaoud Zougar; Referee: Farouk Mial

6 June 2011 Round 22	ES Sétif	1–0	MC El Eulma	Sétif
19:00	Djabou 61'	Soccerway report		Stadium: Stade 8 Mai 1945; Referee: Mohamed Haddada

21 May 2011 Round 23	MC El Eulma	1–1	USM Alger	El Eulma
16:00	Boulemdaïs 27'	Soccerway report	Aouamri 11'	Stadium: Stade Messaoud Zougar; Referee: Mohamed Benouza

27 May 2011 Round 24	CA Bordj Bou Arreridj	1–1	MC El Eulma	Bordj Bou Arréridj
20:00	Bentayeb 54'	Soccerway report	Tiaiba 72'	Stadium: Stade 20 Août 1955; Referee: Mohamed Babou

31 May 2011 Round 25	MC El Eulma	0–2	JSM Béjaïa	El Eulma
17:00		Soccerway report	N'Djeng 66', 81'	Stadium: Stade Messaoud Zougar; Attendance: 0 (close doors); Referee: Youssef Zerrouki

11 June 2011 Round 26	WA Tlemcen	2–0	MC El Eulma	Tlemcen
18:00	Sameur 18'; Belgherri 23' (pen.)	Soccerway report		Stadium: Stade Akid Lotfi; Referee: Mohamed Bichari

25 June 2011 Round 27	MC El Eulma	5–2	MC Saïda	El Eulma
18:00	Benamokrane 15'; Hebbaïche 36' (pen.); Deghiche 47', 61'; Boulemdaïs 82' (pen.)	Soccerway report	Cheraïtia 10'; Sylla 63'	Stadium: Stade Messaoud Zougar; Referee: Mokhtar Amalou

28 June 2011 Round 28	USM Blida	1–1	MC El Eulma	Blida
18:00	Defnoun 14'	Soccerway report	Karaoui 69' (pen.)	Stadium: Stade Mustapha Tchaker; Referee: Mohamed Amine Ghorbal

1 July 2011 Round 29	MC El Eulma	2–0	JS Kabylie	El Eulma
18:00	Boulemdaïs 17', 45+2'	Soccerway report		Stadium: Stade Messaoud Zougar; Referee: Bouaza Chenane

8 July 2011 Round 30	USM El Harrach	1–1	MC El Eulma	Algiers
18:00	Layati 45+4'	Soccerway report	Djillali 1'	Stadium: Stade 1er Novembre 1954; Referee: Mohamed Sahraoui

== Algerian Cup ==
31 December 2010 Round of 64	US Doucen	0–2	MC El Eulma
14:15		Report	Benhadj 56', 67'
Note: Lineup for MC El Eulma - Sahraoui - Bouaraba, Mehia, Messali, Renane - Hammami (Benamokrane 60’), Camara, Mechach (Abdelaoui 68’), Benhadj - Belakhdar (Belazrag 81’), Boulemdaïs.

4 March 2011 Round of 32	MC El Eulma	2–0	AC Arbaâ	El Eulma
15:00	Belaïd 30' (o.g.); Karaoui 78'	Report		Stadium: Stade Messaoud Zougar
Note: Lineup for MC El Eulma - Boutrig - Bouaraba, Hebbaïche, Messali, Renane - Karaoui, Mehia (Kaïba 84’), Camara, Benhadj (Benamokrane 63’), Belakhdar (Kab 58’) - Boulemdaïs.

15 March 2011 Round of 16	JS Kabylie	2–1 (a.e.t.)	MC El Eulma	Tizi Ouzou
14:30	Hamiti 45', 91'	Report	Benamokrane 34'	Stadium: Stade 1er Novembre 1954; Referee: Mohamed Sahraoui
Note: Lineup for MC El Eulma - Boutrig (Sahraoui 73’) - Bouaraba, Hebbaïche, Messali (Mahfoudi 29’), Renane (Hammami 45’) - Benamokrane, Mehia, Camara, Karaoui - Kab, Boulemdaïs.

== Squad information ==
=== Playing statistics ===
No.	Pos	Nat	Player	Total		Ligue 1		Algerian Cup	
No.	Pos	Nat	Player	Apps	Goals	Apps	Goals	Apps	Goals
Goalkeepers
19	GK	(Algeria) ALG	Abderrahmane Boutrig	10	0	10	0	0	0
1	GK	(Algeria) ALG	Salah Sahraoui	14	0	14	0	0	0
16	GK	(Algeria) ALG	Antara Khattala	7	0	7	0	0	0
Defenders
	DF	(Algeria) ALG	Abdenour Mahfoudhi	12	0	12	0	0	0
5	DF	(Algeria) ALG	Adel Messali	25	0	25	0	0	0
2	DF	(Algeria) ALG	Adel Bouaraba	15	0	15	0	0	0
	DF	(Algeria) ALG	Rachid Mehia	19	1	19	1	0	0
3	DF	(Algeria) ALG	Marek Amiri	3	0	3	0	0	0
	DF	(Algeria) ALG	Fayçal Hebbaïche	25	1	25	1	0	0
	DF	(Algeria) ALG	Ziane	1	0	1	0	0	0
	DF	(Algeria) ALG	Benamara	2	0	2	0	0	0
	DF	(Algeria) ALG	Mansouri	1	0	1	0	0	0
Midfielders
6	MF	(Algeria) ALG	Reda Benhadj Djillali	19	2	19	2	0	0
	MF	(Algeria) ALG	Mesbah Deghiche	15	2	15	2	0	0
14	MF	(Algeria) ALG	Amir Karaoui	23	3	23	3	0	0
11	MF	(Algeria) ALG	Fouad Renane	22	0	22	0	0	0
17	MF	(Algeria) ALG	Nourredine Abdellaoui	12	0	12	0	0	0
8	MF	(Algeria) ALG	Nacer Hammami	26	0	26	0	0	0
12	MF	(Ivory Coast) CIV	Madani Camara	18	1	18	1	0	0
13	MF	(Algeria) ALG	Samir Machach	7	0	7	0	0	0
	MF	(Algeria) ALG	Larb	1	0	1	0	0	0
Forwards
	FW	(Algeria) ALG	Mohamed Tiaiba	12	4	12	4	0	0
20	FW	(Algeria) ALG	Toufik Benamokrane	22	4	22	4	0	0
9	FW	(Algeria) ALG	Hamza Boulemdaïs	29	11	29	11	0	0
	FW	(Algeria) ALG	Ali Lamine Kab	11	0	11	0	0	0
7	FW	(Algeria) ALG	Abdelmoutaleb Ghodbane	8	1	8	1	0	0
	FW	(Algeria) ALG	Younès Kadri	19	1	19	1	0	0
15	FW	(Algeria) ALG	Faycal Belakhdar	16	0	16	0	0	0
	FW	(Algeria) ALG	Abdelmalek Abbes	5	0	5	0	0	0
	FW	(Algeria) ALG	Mohamed Safari	1	0	1	0	0	0
Players transferred out during the season
21	FW	(Algeria) ALG	Hamza Medjahed	3	0	3	0	0	0
23	FW	(Algeria) ALG	Djabir Naâmoune	7	0	7	0	0	0

Last updated: 30 November 2017
Source: fr.soccerway.com

=== Goalscorers ===
Includes all competitive matches. The list is sorted alphabetically by surname when total goals are equal.

No.	Nat.	Player	Pos.	L 1	AC	TOTAL
9	(Algeria)	Hamza Boulemdaïs	FW	11	0	11
20	(Algeria)	Toufik Benamokrane	FW	4	1	5
	(Algeria)	Mohamed Tiaiba	FW	4	0	4
14	(Algeria)	Amir Karaoui	MF	3	1	4
6	(Algeria)	Reda Benhadj Djillali	MF	2	2	4
	(Algeria)	Mesbah Deghiche	MF	2	0	2
12	(Ivory Coast)	Madani Camara	MF	1	0	1
	(Algeria)	Rachid Mehia	DF	1	0	1
	(Algeria)	Fayçal Hebbaïche	DF	1	0	1
	(Algeria)	Younès Kadri	FW	1	0	
7	(Algeria)	Abdelmoutaleb Ghodbane	FW	1	0	1
Own Goals				1	1	2
Totals				32	5	37

== Transfers ==
=== In ===
Date	Pos	Player	From club	Transfer fee	Source
1 July 2010	GK	(Algeria) Abderrahmane Boutrig	USM El Harrach	Free transfer	
1 July 2010	DF	(Algeria) Fayçal Hebbaïche	USM Annaba	Free transfer	
1 July 2010	DF	(Algeria) Adel Messali	JSM Béjaïa	Free transfer	
1 July 2010	DF	(Algeria) Marek Amiri	(France) US Marseille Endoume	Free transfer	
1 July 2010	DF	(Algeria) Adel Bouaraba	MSP Batna	Free transfer	
1 July 2010	MF	(Algeria) Samir Machach	(France) US Marseille Endoume	Free transfer	
1 July 2010	MF	(Algeria) Nourredine Abdellaoui	WA Tlemcen	Free transfer	
1 July 2010	FW	(Algeria) Toufik Benamokrane	MSP Batna	Free transfer	
1 July 2010	MF	(Algeria) Nacer Hammami	USM Annaba	Free transfer	
1 July 2010	DF	(Algeria) Rachid Mehia	JSM Béjaïa	Free transfer	
1 July 2010	FW	(Algeria) Faycal Belakhdar	WA Boufarik	Free transfer	
1 July 2010	FW	(Algeria) Djabir Naamoune	AS Khroub	Free transfer	
1 July 2010	FW	(Algeria) Younès Kadri	ES Sétif	Free transfer	
1 July 2010	MF	(Algeria) Mesbah Deghiche	JSM Béjaïa	Free transfer	
1 July 2010	FW	(Algeria) Mohamed Tiaiba	USM Sétif	Free transfer	
1 July 2010	FW	(Algeria) Hamza Boulemdaïs	JSM Béjaïa	Free transfer	
1 January 2011	FW	(Algeria) Ali Lamine Kab	CA Bordj Bou Arreridj	Free transfer	

=== Out ===
Date	Pos	Player	To club	Transfer fee	Source
1 January 2011	MF	(Algeria) Hamza Medjahed	MC Oran	Free transfer	
1 January 2011	FW	(Algeria) Djabir Naâmoune	USM Annaba	Free transfer	
