= Football at the 2003 All-Africa Games – Men's team squads =

Below are the squads for the Football at the 2003 All-Africa Games, hosted by Abuja, Nigeria, and which took place between 4 and 16 October 2003.

== Group B ==
=== Algeria ===
Head coach: Rachid Aït Mohamed and Abderrahmane Mehdaoui

No.	Pos.	Player	Date of birth (age)	Club
	GK	Merouane Abdouni	27 March 1981 (aged 22)	(Algerian Football Federation) USM Alger
	GK	Yacine Djebarat	27 January 1981 (aged 22)	(Algerian Football Federation) JSM Béjaïa
	DF	Smaïl Chaoui	2 November 1982 (aged 20)	(Algerian Football Federation) ASO Chlef
	DF	Adel Messali	31 July 1983 (aged 20)	(Algerian Football Federation) ES Sétif
	DF	Adel Maïza	18 March 1983 (aged 20)	(Algerian Football Federation) CS Constantine
	DF	Lamine Boutabia	26 February 1981 (aged 22)	(Algerian Football Federation) USM Annaba
	DF	Islam Boukemacha		(Algerian Football Federation) CR Béni Thour
	DF	Abdelkader Benayada	5 May 1982 (aged 21)	(Algerian Football Federation) ASM Oran
	DF	Amine Aksas	5 March 1983 (aged 20)	(Algerian Football Federation) OMR El Annasser
	DF	Abdelkader Laïfaoui	29 July 1981 (aged 22)	(Algerian Football Federation) NA Hussein Dey
	DF	Mohamed Yekhlef	12 January 1981 (aged 22)	(Algerian Football Federation) WA Tlemcen
	MF	Nabil Hamouda	4 January 1983 (aged 20)	(Algerian Football Federation) RC Kouba
	MF	Sofiane Chaïb	21 May 1981 (aged 22)	(Algerian Football Federation) WA Tlemcen
	MF	Mesbah Deghiche	30 March 1981 (aged 22)	(Algerian Football Federation) MC Alger
	FW	Adlène Bensaïd	3 November 1981 (aged 21)	(Algerian Football Federation) USM Annaba
	FW	Boubakeur Atmani		(Algerian Football Federation) USM Annaba
	FW	Karim Ali Hadji	14 May 1981 (aged 22)	(Algerian Football Federation) ASO Chlef
	FW	Hadj Bouguèche	7 December 1983 (aged 19)	(Algerian Football Federation) RC Kouba
		Abdelmalek Bentouaf		(Algerian Football Federation) WA Tlemcen
		Korichi Samir Bendhiba		
