= Fotso =

Fotso is a surname. Notable people with the surname include:

- Faustine Fotso (born 1965), Cameroonian scientist and lawyer
- Joseph Fotso (born 1983), Cameroonian footballer
- Kareyce Fotso, Cameroonian singer
- Kate Fotso, Cameroonian businesswoman
- Stéphanie Fotso Mogoung (born 1987), Cameroonian volleyball player
- Victor Fotso (1926–2020), Cameroonian politician
