= Eguakun =

Eguakun is a surname. Notable people with the surname include:

- Efosa Eguakun (born 1986), Nigerian footballer
- Kingsley Eguakun (born 2001), American football player
