= Souanga =

Souanga is a surname. Notable people with the surname include:

- Christ Souanga (born 2006), Belgian footballer
- Philippe Souanga (born 1984), Ivorian footballer
