= Kate Fotso =

Cameroonian businesswoman

- Other name: Kate Kanyi-Tometi Fotso
- Citizenship: Cameroonian
- Occupation: Businesswoman
- Years active: 1990s–present
- Known for: Cocoa exports
- Title: Founder and chief executive of Telcar Cocoa; president of the Cocoa Exporters Union
- Board member of: Autonomous Port of Kribi
- Spouse: André Fotso (died 2016)
- Awards: Stand Up For African Women Entrepreneurs (2019)

Kate Kanyi-Tometi Fotso is a Cameroonian businesswoman, founder and chief executive of Telcar Cocoa, for many years the largest cocoa exporter in Cameroon. She has been called the "iron lady of the cocoa sector".

According to Forbes Africa, she is the richest woman in Cameroon and the 20th-richest person in francophone sub-Saharan Africa. After the end of her company's partnership with Cargill in 2025, she has diversified into hospitality and brewing.

== Biography ==
=== Early life and beginnings ===
Fotso is a native of the South West Region, in the anglophone part of Cameroon. Before starting her own business, she worked for five years for the American agricultural trading firm Cargill.

=== Career ===
Fotso founded Telcar Cocoa in 1997; Cargill took a 49% stake in the company and became its main international buyer, a partnership that lasted nearly twenty years. Telcar became Cameroon's leading cocoa exporter, accounting for more than 30% of the country's exports in 2016, about 74,000 tonnes at its 2016/17 peak and 35.1% of the market in 2023/24. Through the Cargill Cocoa Promise programme, about 21,000 farmers in four regions were trained in good agricultural practices between 2011 and 2015. In 2011 she launched the Coop Academy, a certification programme for cocoa cooperatives involving more than 30,000 producers, which brought the first investments of the International Finance Corporation into Cameroon's cocoa sector. During the 2021/22 season, Telcar acquired the cocoa business of Ets Ndongo Essomba.

In January 2025 Cargill ended its partnership with Telcar, officially citing an unforeseen problem with sourcing operations. Telcar's exports fell by 53% to 31,029 tonnes in 2024/25 (16.18% of national exports) and it lost first place to Social Business Enterprise Technology (SBET), before regaining the lead in 2025/26 with 40,631 tonnes (32.38%).

Fotso has diversified beyond cocoa: in September 2023 she set up Bridge Riviera Development and Hospitalities in Douala, covering luxury hotels and real estate, and in April 2026 she announced a 17-billion-CFA-franc (about US$28.3 million) beverage plant at Souza, in the Littoral Region.

She was appointed by President Paul Biya to represent exporters on the board of the autonomous port of Kribi and is a shareholder in Ecobank Cameroun. She also chairs the Cocoa Exporters Union.

=== Recognition ===
In 2016 Forbes Africa estimated her net worth at US$252 million (about 150 billion CFA francs), making her the richest woman in Cameroon, the 20th-richest person in francophone sub-Saharan Africa and the first woman to rank in its top 30. In 2017 Jeune Afrique ranked her 24th among the most influential women business leaders in francophone Africa, and the French-language edition of Slate named her one of the ten most influential people in Cameroon. In October 2019 she won the first prize of the Stand Up For African Women Entrepreneurs competition in Douala, organised by Club Afrique Développement (Attijariwafa Bank) and SCB Cameroun. In 2023 she was one of four Cameroonian nominees for the Forbes Afrique Top 50 Women list.

=== Personal life ===
She was married to André Fotso, founder of the TAF Investment Group and president of the Cameroonian employers' association (GICAM) from 2012. He died in Paris on 2 August 2016, after which she took over the management of his investments.

== See also ==
- Agriculture in Cameroon
