= Francois Xavier Koufana Eyengue =

Cameroonian footballer

Koufana Eyengue
Personal information
- Full name: Francois Xavier Koufana Eyengue
- Date of birth: January 3, 1988 (age 38)
- Place of birth: Bafoussam, Cameroon
- Height: 1.84 m (6 ft 1/2 in)
- Position: Center back

Team information
- Current team: Union Douala
- Number: 14

Senior career*
| Years | Team | Apps | (Gls) |
| 2002–2009 | Astres FC | 55 | (12) |
| 2009–2010 | ES Sahel | 12 | (2) |
| 2010–2011 | Almadina S.C. | 25 | (5) |
| 2011–2012 | CA Batna | 18 | (0) |
| 2012– | Union Douala | | |

International career
| 2009–2011 | Cameroon U-20 | 4 | (0) |
- * Club domestic league appearances and goals as of 7 July 2013 (UTC)

Koufana Francois (often erroneously reported as Francois Koufana) is a Cameroonian professional football player. He plays for Union Douala.
