= Uche Akubuike =

Nigerian footballer (born 1980)

Personal information
- Date of birth: 17 March 1980 (age 46)
- Place of birth: Kaduna State, Nigeria
- Height: 1.80 m (5 ft 11 in)
- Position: Goalkeeper

Senior career*
Years	Team	Apps	(Gls)
1997	NITEL Lagos		
1998–1999	Jasper United		
- Gabros International
- USM Blida
- Canon Yaoundé
–2003	Gombe United		
2003–2005	Julius Berger		
2004–2005	→ Platinum Stars (loan)		
2005	Dolphins		
2006	→ Kwara United (loan)		
2007–2008	Sharks		
2008–2010	Wikki Tourists		
2010–2012	Gombe United		
2012	Enyimba		

International career
1998	Nigeria	5	(0)
- * Club domestic league appearances and goals

Uche Akubuike (born 17 March 1980) is a Nigerian former professional footballer who played as a goalkeeper.

== Club career ==
Akubuike began his career in 1997 with NITEL Vasco Da Gama F.C. later moving in 1998 to Jasper United. After one year with Jasper United, he left the club and moved to Algerian USM Blida. Afterwards he signed with Canon Yaoundé. In January 2003 he transferred to Julius Berger, and, later, he played on loan for Platinum Stars in 2005.

He controversially left the South African club after being arrested for visa irregularities. He left Berger in 2006 and moved to Dolphins F.C. Later in 2006, he moved on loan to Kwara United After the loan returned for one month before moving to crosstown rival Sharks F.C. On 14 February 2008, left Port Harcourt and signs a contract for Wikki Tourists. AKubuike then played with Gombe United between 2010 and 2012.

He signed for Enyimba in May 2012.

== International career ==
Akubuike was called up by Bora Milutinović for the Nigeria national team as back-up goalkeeper in the 1998 FIFA World Cup. He has also played a number of friendly matches and was part of Nigerian team in the African Nations Cup qualifiers. He was also part of the Nigerian team in the Hong Kong 4 Nations Tournament.
