= Mohamed Dahmane =

Algerian footballer (born 1982)

Personal information
- Date of birth: April 9, 1982 (age 44)
- Place of birth: Maubeuge, France
- Height: 1.80 m (5 ft 11 in)
- Position: Striker

Youth career
- 1999–2001: AS Hautmont
- 2001–2003: RC Lens

Senior career*
Years	Team	Apps	(Gls)
2003–2004	→ FC Poitiers (loan)	7	(0)
2004–2005	SC Feignies		
2005	US Maubeuge		
2005–2006	Borains		
2006–2007	Mons	32	(9)
2007–2008	Genk	11	(1)
2008–2009	Mons	29	(12)
2009–2010	Club Brugge	30	(4)
2010–2011	Bucaspor	6	(0)
2011	Eupen	4	(0)
2011–2012	CS Constantine	19	(5)
2012–2013	Bucaspor	16	(3)
2013–2014	CR Belouizdad	7	(2)
2014–2016	SC Paturages		
2016–2020	UR La Louvière Centre	76	(33)
2020–2024	Olympic Charleroi	47	(11)

International career
2004	Algeria U23	7	(1)

Managerial career
- 2018–2019: UR La Louvière Centre (sporting director)
- 2019–2020: UR La Louvière Centre (president)
- 2020–2022: Olympic Charleroi (sporting director)
- 2022–2023: Olympic Charleroi (president)
- * Club domestic league appearances and goals

Mohamed "Momo" Dahmane (Arabic: محمد دحمان; born April 9, 1982) is a retired footballer. Born in France, he represented Algeria at youth level.

== Career ==
Mons signed Dahmane in January 2006 from the Belgian Third Division. He helped the club win the Belgian Second Division in the summer of 2006.

On January 30, 2009, Dahmane joined Club Brugge from Mons on a two-and-a-half-year deal running until 2011, with the club paying a €500,000 transfer fee.

On September 1, 2010, he signed a one-year contract with Turkish club Bucaspor. However, on January 4, 2011, he reached a mutual agreement with the club to terminate his contract.

In the summer 2016, Dahmane joined UR La Louvière Centre. Later, in January 2018, Dahmane was also appointed general director of the club, which he would combine with his duties as a player. Around September 2019, the club was sold to a number of French investors and Dahmane was appointed president of the club, still in a combined role as a player.

In April 2020, it was confirmed that Dahmane would be joining Olympic Charleroi from the upcoming season, where he would combine the role of player with the role of sporting director at the club. In the summer of 2022, he was appointed as the new president of the club. At the end of December 2023, Dahmane confirmed that he was stepping down as president of the club, and by the end of January, he was completely done with the club.
