= Marek Amiri =

French footballer (born 1987)

Personal information
- Full name: Marek Karim Amiri
- Date of birth: 20 February 1987 (age 39)
- Place of birth: France
- Position: Defender

Senior career*
Years	Team	Apps	(Gls)
	Olympique Lyonnais	0	(0)
2008-2010	US Marseille Endoume		
2010/2011	MC El Eulma	3	(0)
2011-2012	FC Aurillac Arpajon Cantal Auvergne		
2013-2018	Athlético Marseille	142	(4)
2020-	US Marseille Endoume		
- * Club domestic league appearances and goals

Marek Amiri (born 20 February 1987 in France) is a French footballer.
