= Jean-Michel Liade Gnonka =

Burkinabé footballer

Jean-Michel Gnonka
Personal information
- Full name: Jean-Michel Liade Gnonka
- Date of birth: 20 July 1980 (age 46)
- Place of birth: Ouagadougou, Upper Volta
- Height: 1.83 m (6 ft 0 in)
- Position: Defender

Senior career*
Years	Team	Apps	(Gls)
1997–2000	ASFA Yennega	92	(0)
2000–2004	RC Kouba	46	(0)
2004–2006	Etoile Filante	50	(1)
2006–2007	Paradou AC	11	(0)
2007–2009	AS Khroub	48	(0)
2012–2015	Krabi	?	(4)

International career
1998–2000	Burkina Faso	8	(0)
- * Club domestic league appearances and goals

Jean-Michel Liade Gnonka (born 20 July 1980) is a Burkinabé former professional footballer who played as a defender.

== International career ==
Gnonka was part of the Burkina Faso national team at the 2004 African Nations Cup, which finished bottom of its group in the first round of competition, thus failing to secure qualification for the quarter-finals.
