= Nordine Sam =

Algerian football player (born 1982)

Personal information
- Full name: Nordine Belahmideche Sam
- Date of birth: 25 March 1982 (age 44)
- Place of birth: Toulouse, France
- Height: 1.83 m (6 ft 0 in)
- Position: Central defender

Youth career
- 1998–2002: RC Strasbourg

Senior career*
Years	Team	Apps	(Gls)
2002–2004	RC Strasbourg	1	(0)
2004–2005	FC La Chaux-de-Fonds	27	(0)
2005–2007	FC Luzern	52	(3)
2007	FC Luzern II	?	(?)
2007–2010	Nea Salamis Famagusta FC	50	(1)
2010–2011	Al-Nasr Benghazi	-	(-)
2011	CS Constantine	4	(0)

International career^{‡}
2003	Algeria U23	2	(0)
- * Club domestic league appearances and goals as of 00:00, February 19, 2012 (UTC) ‡ National team caps and goals as of October 4, 2009

Nordine Belahmideche Sam (born 25 March 1982) is an Algerian football player.

== Club career ==
A product of the RC Strasbourg academy, Sam made just one appearance for the RC Strasbourg first team, a 0–0 draw against AC Ajaccio in the final week of the 2002-2003 Ligue 1 season. In 2005, Sam left the club to join FC Luzern who were playing in the Swiss Challenge League. He helped the team win the division in 2006 and gain promotion to the Swiss top flight. However, he was dropped down to the reserve team for the 2007 season and terminated his contracted with the club in December 2007. He quickly received an offer from Nea Salamis and a signed a contract for two and a half years.

== International career ==
Sam played two games for the Algerian Under-23 National Team in 2003, against Tunisia and Libya.

== Personal ==
Although born in France, Sam is originally from Mostaganem, Algeria.
