= Adam Bouzid =

French-Algerian footballer (born 1987)

Personal information
- Date of birth: 30 November 1987 (age 38)
- Place of birth: Nancy, France
- Height: 1.81 m (5 ft 11 in)
- Position: Midfielder

Youth career
- 2004–2006: Metz

Senior career*
| Years | Team | Apps | (Gls) |
| 2006–2007 | FSV Oggersheim | 2 | (0) |
| 2006–2007 | Wormatia Worms | 14 | (1) |
| 2007–2008 | 1899 Hoffenheim II | 3 | (0) |
| 2008–2009 | FSV Oggersheim | | |
| 2009 | Troyes | | |
| 2009–2010 | MC Oujda | | |
| 2010–2011 | Southend United | 0 | (0) |
| 2011–2013 | MC El Eulma | 20 | (0) |
| 2013–2014 | SVN Zweibrücken | 42 | (2) |
| 2015–2017 | FK Pirmasens | 67 | (0) |
| 2017–2018 | Eintracht Trier | 26 | (1) |
| 2018–2020 | Etzella Ettelbruck | 19 | (0) |
- * Club domestic league appearances and goals

Adam Bouzid (born 30 November 1987) is a French former professional footballer who played as a midfielder. He is the younger brother of Algeria international player Ismaël Bouzid.

== Career ==
=== Youth career ===
Bouzid began his playing career in the junior ranks of FC Metz and of LB Châteauroux. He then played in the junior ranks of a number of clubs in France and Germany: FC Metz, FSV Oggersheim, Wormatia Worms, 1899 Hoffenheim II and ES Troyes.

=== Mouloudia Oujda ===
Bouzid spent the 2009–10 season with Mouloudia Oujda in the Moroccan Botola 2.

=== Southend United ===
In August 2010, Bouzid moved to England to sign with Southend United of League Two, as one of seventeen new signings. This move came despite difficulties in securing his transfer from the Moroccan club, after delays in getting the necessary paperwork from the Moroccan government. He made his debut for the club in the Football League Trophy in their goalless First Round encounter with Gillingham at Roots Hall, he was replaced by Louie Soares at half-time before Southend went on to win 4–3 on penalties. On 26 October 2010, Bouzid suffered a head injury in a reserve team game against Colchester United which required emergency surgery to his skull. On 14 January 2011, Bouzid went on a week-long trial with Scottish club Ross County. However, he did not do enough to impress manager Willie McStay and returned to Southend. In May 2011 he was one of five players told they were to be released by Southend.
