= Joseph Fotso =

Cameroonian footballer

Personal information
- Full name: Joseph Fotso Kamto
- Date of birth: 3 January 1983 (age 43)
- Place of birth: Sissé, Cameroon
- Height: 1.84 m (6 ft 0 in)
- Position: Forward

Team information
- Current team: Asswehly S.C.

Senior career*
Years	Team	Apps	(Gls)
2002–2003	Tonnerre KC Yaoundé		
2003–2004	NK Brotnjo		
2004–2007	MC Oran	17	(2)
2007–2009	Al-Akhdhar SC		
2009–	Asswehly SC		
- * Club domestic league appearances and goals as of 16 January 2012

Joseph Fotso Kamto (otherwise known as Fotso; born 3 January 1983) is a Cameroonian professional footballer who plays as a forward for Asswehly S.C. in the Libyan Premier League.

== Clubs ==
- Tonnerre KC Yaoundé
- NK Brotnjo
- MC Oran
- Alakhdhar S.C.
- Asswehly S.C.
