= Philippe Souanga =

Ivorian footballer

Personal information
- Full name: Philippe Souanga
- Date of birth: August 2, 1984 (age 42)
- Place of birth: Marcory, Ivory Coast
- Position: Striker

Team information
- Current team: AS Denguele

Youth career
- Africa Sports

Senior career*
| Years | Team | Apps | (Gls) |
| 2006–2008 | Africa Sports | | |
| 2008 | AS Denguele | | |
| 2008–2010 | USM Annaba | | |
| 2010–2011 | Widad Fez | | |
| 2012 | CODM Meknès | | |
| 2012– | AS Denguele | | |
- * Club domestic league appearances and goals

Philippe Souanga (born August 2, 1984, in Marcory, Ivory Coast) is an Ivorian footballer who currently plays for AS Denguele.
