= Djamel Bouaïcha =

Algerian footballer (born 1982)

Personal information
- Full name: Djamel Bouaïcha
- Date of birth: June 19, 1982 (age 44)
- Place of birth: Meftah, Algeria
- Height: 1.86 m (6 ft 1 in)
- Position: Forward

Team information
- Current team: RC Arbaâ
- Number: 24

Senior career*
Years	Team	Apps	(Gls)
2004–2005	WR Meftah	-	(-)
2005–2010	Paradou AC	-	(-)
2010–2011	USM Annaba	23	(3)
2011–2012	MC El Eulma	28	(11)
2012–2013	JS Kabylie	13	(2)
2013–2014	MC Oran	19	(5)
2014–	RC Arbaâ	0	(0)
- * Club domestic league appearances and goals as of 00:00, September 21, 2013 (UTC)

Djamel Bouaïcha (born June 19, 1982) is an Algerian football player who plays for RC Arbaâ in the Algerian Ligue Professionnelle 1.

== Club career ==
In the summer of 2011, Bouaïcha left USM Annaba for MC El Eulma. On September 10, 2011, he made his debut for the club, in a league match against CR Belouizdad. A week later, in his second match for the club, he scored two goals against WA Tlemcen.
