= Saafi Boulbaba =

Tunisian footballer (1986–2022)

Personal information
- Date of birth: 18 March 1986
- Place of birth: Tunisia
- Date of death: 3 June 2022 (aged 36)
- Place of death: Borj El Amri, Tunisia
- Position: Defender

Senior career*
Years	Team	Apps	(Gls)
2005–2008	Espérance Tunis		
2009	AS Marsa		
2009–2011	AS Kasserine		
2011–2012	MC El Eulma	9	(0)
- * Club domestic league appearances and goals

Saafi Boulbaba (18 March 1986 – 3 June 2022) was a Tunisian professional footballer who played as a defender. He died as the result of a traffic accident in the town of Borj El Amri, Tunisia.
