= Abderrahmane Diarra =

Burkinabe footballer (born 1988)

Abder Diarra
Personal information
- Full name: Abdramane Ladji Diarra
- Date of birth: 9 July 1988 (age 38)
- Place of birth: Bobo-Dioulasso, Burkina Faso
- Position: Forward

Youth career
- Etoile Filante

Senior career*
Years	Team	Apps	(Gls)
2008–2009	Etoile Filante		
2008–2011	Paços de Ferreira	1	(0)
2010	→ Beira-Mar (loan)	0	(0)
2010–2011	→ Tourizense (loan)	0	(0)
2011	Chengdu Blades		
2012–2013	MC El Eulma	15	(4)
2013	AS Mangasport		
2014	AS Kaloum		
2014–2015	Oliveira do Hospital		
2015	Rivers United		
2016–2017	ASFA Yennenga		
2018–2021	Aduana Football Club		

International career
2006–2007	Burkina Faso U20	4	(0)
2008–2009	Burkina Faso U23	3	(0)
2011	Burkina Faso	1	(0)
- * Club domestic league appearances and goals

Abdramane Ladji Diarra (born 9 July 1988) is a Burkinabe former professional footballer who played as a forward.

== Career ==
Diarra started his senior career with Etoile Filante Ouagadougou, before moving to Portuguese club Paços de Ferreira. He played few games in the reserve and was in January 2010 loaned to Beira-Mar. Diarra returned on 30 May 2010 to Paços de Ferreira and was loaned out, for the second time now to Tourizense. After one season with Tourizense in the Portuguese Second Division and the return to Paços de Ferreira, was released by the Portuguese Liga Sangres side. After his resign with Paços de Ferreira moved to Chinese club Chengdu Blades

He later joined Algerian Ligue Professionnelle 1 side MC El Eulma.

== Honours ==
- Burkinabé Premier League: 2007–08
