= Madani Camara =

Ivorian footballer

Personal information
- Full name: Madani Camara
- Date of birth: 30 March 1987 (age 39)
- Place of birth: Ivory Coast
- Height: 1.87 m (6 ft 1 1/2 in)
- Position: Midfielder

Team information
- Current team: JS Kabylie
- Number: 28

Senior career*
Years	Team	Apps	(Gls)
–2009	Vallée Bouaké	-	(-)
2009–2011	MC El Eulma	58	(1)
2011–2013	JS Kabylie	23	(0)

International career
	Ivory Coast U20	-	(-)
	Ivory Coast U23	-	(-)
- * Club domestic league appearances and goals as of 00:00, August 1, 2012 (UTC)

Madani Camara (born March 30, 1987) is an Ivorian football player. He currently plays for JS Kabylie in the Algerian Ligue Professionnelle 1.

== Club career ==
Camara began his career with Vallée Athletic Club de Bouaké in the Côte d'Ivoire Second Division. In 2009, he joined Algerian club MC El Eulma where he spent two seasons and a half seasons.

On June 26, 2011, Camara signed a three-year contract with JS Kabylie.

== International career ==
Camara has represented Ivory Coast at the Under-20 and Under-23 level.
