= Adel Messali =

Algerian footballer (born 1983)

Personal information
- Full name: Adel Messali
- Date of birth: 31 July 1983 (age 43)
- Place of birth: Sétif, Algeria
- Height: 1.80 m (5 ft 11 in)
- Position: Defender

Team information
- Current team: MC El Eulma
- Number: 5

Senior career*
Years	Team	Apps	(Gls)
2000–2005	ES Sétif	-	(-)
2005–2006	Paradou AC	24	(0)
2006–2007	MC El Eulma	-	(-)
2007–2010	JSM Béjaïa	-	(-)
2010–	MC El Eulma	19	(0)

International career^{‡}
2003–2004	Algeria U23	8	(0)
- * Club domestic league appearances and goals as of 00:00, 27 May 2011 (UTC) ‡ National team caps and goals as of 00:00, 27 May 2011 (UTC)

Adel Messali (Arabic: عادل مصالي; born 31 July 1983) is an Algerian footballer. He currently plays for MC El Eulma in the Algerian Ligue Professionnelle 1.

== Club career ==
On 16 June 2008 Messali started for JSM Béjaïa in the final of the 2007–08 Algerian Cup. He played the entire game as JSM Béjaïa won 3–1 in the penalty shootout.

== International career ==
Messali was a member of the Algerian Under-23 National Team in 2003 and 2004. He played at the 2003 All-Africa Games in Nigeria and the qualifiers for the 2004 Summer Olympics.

== Honours ==
- Won the Algerian Cup once with JSM Béjaïa in 2008
