= Efosa Eguakun =

Nigerian football player

Personal information
- Date of birth: 1 November 1986 (age 40)
- Place of birth: Delta State, Nigeria
- Position: Striker

Senior career*
Years	Team	Apps	(Gls)
–2000	Julius Berger FC	-	(-)
2001–2006	Dolphins FC	1	(-)
2006–2008	Al-Merrikh	5	(-)
2008	→ Al-Masry (loan)	2	(2)
2008–2010	Al-Masry	2	(2)
2014	Al-Nasr	?	(?)
2011–	Constantine	23	(4)
- → Hatta Club (loan)

International career
2003	Nigeria U-23		
- * Club domestic league appearances and goals

Efosa Egwakun (born 1 November 1986 in Delta State) is a Nigerian football player, who plays for Hatta Club in the United Arab Emirates Division 2 Group B, on loan from Algerian Ligue Professionnelle 1 club CS Constantine.

== Career ==
He began his career at Julius Berger FC and joined than to Dolphins F.C. After several years with Dolphins F.C. played for Al-Merrikh in Sudan after his transfer in 2006 from the Nigerian club, he came also with teammate Endurance Idahor. Effosa had been chosen in 2006 by the Confederation of African Football as the second best African young player, second only to Mohammed Barakat from Al Ahly of Egypt. He played from January 2008 to July 2008 on loan with El-Masry in Egypt from Al-Merrikh, the club sold him in July 2008 and he signing a two-year contract with the Egyptian club. On July 19, 2011, Eguakon signed a two-year contract with CS Constantine, joining them on a free transfer from Nasr Benghazi.

=== Position ===
Effosa's best position is a right sided winger although in Al-Merrikh he was mainly performing as playmaker.

=== Position ===
Eguakon can play as offensive central midfield, offensive right midfield or as right forward.
