= Mesbah Deghiche =

Algerian footballer (born 1981)

Personal information
- Full name: Mesbah Deghiche
- Date of birth: 30 March 1981 (age 45)
- Place of birth: Kouba, Algiers, Algeria
- Height: 1.80 m (5 ft 11 in)
- Position: Forward

Youth career
- 1996–1999: CA Kouba

Senior career*
Years	Team	Apps	(Gls)
1999–2004	MC Alger	36	(4)
2005	US Biskra	-	(-)
2005–2006	MO Béjaïa	-	(-)
2006–2010	JSM Béjaïa	109	(1)
2010–2012	MC El Eulma	32	(1)
2012–2013	USO Amizour	-	(-)
2013-2016	NC Magra	-	(-)
2016-2019	NR Zéralda	-	(-)

International career
2000	Algeria U20	1	(0)
2003–2004	Algeria U23	9	(1)
- * Club domestic league appearances and goals

Mesbah Deghiche (born 30 March 1981) is an Algerian former footballer.

== Personal ==
Mesbah's younger brother, Rafik, is also a former footballer.
