= 2014–15 MC El Eulma season =

MC El Eulma
2014–15 season
- Chairman: Arras Herrada
- Head coach: Jules Accorsi; Azzedine Aït Djoudi; Jules Accorsi
- Stadium: Stade Messaoud Zougar
- Ligue 1: 14th
- Algerian Cup: Round of 32
- CAF Champions League: Second round
- Top goalscorer: League: Walid Derrardja (16); All: Walid Derrardja (19)

In the 2014–15 season, MC El Eulma is competing in the Ligue 1 for the 7th season, as well as the Algerian Cup. It is their 7th consecutive season in the top flight of Algerian football. They will be competing in Ligue 1, the CAF Champions League, and the Algerian Cup.

== Squad list ==
Players and squad numbers last updated on 18 November 2014.
Note: Flags indicate national team as has been defined under FIFA eligibility rules. Players may hold more than one non-FIFA nationality.

No.	Nat.	Position	Name	Date of birth (age)	Signed from
Goalkeepers
1	(Algeria)	GK	Mohamed Ousserir	5 February 1978 (aged 36)	(Algeria) CR Belouizdad
16	(France) (Algeria)	GK	Tarek Mahsas	18 June 1991 (aged 23)	(France) Paris FC
30	(Algeria)	GK	Hichem Layachi	1 January 1993 (aged 22)	(Algeria) Youth system
Defenders
-	(Algeria)	RB	Abdelraouf Baâziz	11 July 1992 (aged 22)	(Algeria) Youth system
-	(Algeria)	RB	Hichem Benamar	22 February 1990 (aged 24)	(Algeria) Youth system
3	(Algeria)	RB	Khaled Bouzama	13 January 1988 (aged 26)	(Algeria)
5	(Algeria)	RB	Adel Namane	14 June 1987 (aged 27)	(Algeria) ESM Koléa
21	(Algeria)	RB	Tarek Zeghidi	12 November 1985 (aged 29)	(Algeria) MSP Batna
6	(Algeria)	RB	Mohamed Belhadi	13 July 1986 (aged 28)	(Algeria) USM Bel-Abbès
-	(Algeria)	RB	Ishak Benameur	6 September 1986 (aged 28)	(Algeria)
23	(Algeria)	RB	Adel Maïza	18 March 1983 (aged 31)	(Algeria) CS Constantine
14	(Algeria)	RB	Nassim Oussalah	8 October 1981 (aged 33)	(Algeria) CA Batna
Midfielders
10	(Algeria)	CM	Nacer Hammami	28 December 1980 (aged 34)	(Algeria) USM Annaba
4	(Algeria)	CM	Sofiane Bouterbiat	5 December 1983 (aged 31)	(Algeria) MC Oran
-	(Mali)	CM	Yahia Coulibaly		(Mali)
-	(Algeria)	CM	Mohamed Rachi	15 February 1993 (aged 21)	(Algeria) Youth system
7	(Algeria)	CM	Ismail Bentayeb	12 March 1989 (aged 25)	(Algeria) ASO Chlef
24	(Algeria)	CM	Ibrahim Chenihi	24 January 1990 (aged 24)	(Algeria) Youth system
-	(Algeria)	CM	Mehdi Ghazi	12 December 1990 (aged 24)	(Algeria) Youth system
8	(Algeria)	CM	Alaeddine Labiod	2 October 1990 (aged 24)	(Algeria) USM Bel-Abbès
2	(Algeria)	CM	Mokhtar Belkhiter	15 January 1992 (aged 22)	(Algeria) USM Blida
Forwards
17	(Algeria)	RW	Walid Derrardja	18 September 1990 (aged 24)	(Algeria) NA Hussein Dey
31	(Algeria)	RW	Abdelmalek Abbès	11 February 1991 (aged 23)	(Algeria) Youth system
9	(Algeria)	RW	Farès Hamiti	26 June 1987 (aged 27)	(Algeria) CR Belouizdad
11	(Algeria)	RW	Ahmed Kara	22 March 1985 (aged 29)	(Algeria) CRB Aïn Fakroun
32	(Algeria)	RW	Younès Kadri	4 January 1991 (aged 23)	(Algeria) ES Sétif

== Competitions ==
=== Overview ===
Competition	Record								Started round	Final position / round	First match	Last match
Competition	G	W	D	L	GF	GA	GD	Win %	Started round	Final position / round	First match	Last match
Ligue 1	30	11	5	14	40	36	+4	36.67	—N/a	14th	16 August 2014	29 May 2015
Algerian Cup	2	1	1	0	5	4	+1	50.00	Round of 64	Round of 32	23 December 2014	27 December 2014
Champions League	6	3	1	2	5	4	+1	50.00	Preliminary round	Second round	14 February 2015	3 May 2015
Total	38	15	7	16	50	44	+6	39.47				

=== Ligue 1 ===
The Ligue 1 2014-2015 is the fifty-first edition of Algerian Ligue Professionnelle 1 and the fifth under the name Ligue 1. Division opposes sixteen clubs in a series of thirty meetings. The best in the league qualify for the African cups that are the Champions League (the podium) and Confederation Cup (the third and the winner national cup).

The relegated the previous season, JSM Bejaia on CA Bordj Bou Arreridj and CRB Ain Fakroun are replaced by USM Bel-Abbès, Ligue 2 in 2013-2014 after a year's absence, the ASM Oran, 7 years after his last appearance at the highest national level, and NA Hussein Dey relegated to Ligue 2 during the 2010–2011 season.

==== League table ====
Pos	Team	Pld	W	D	L	GF	GA	GD	Pts	Qualification or relegation
12	MC Alger	30	10	9	11	33	31	+2	39 (Note: JSS: 9 points; MCA: 6 points; JSK: 3 points)	
13	JS Kabylie	30	11	6	13	35	35	0	39	
14	MC El Eulma (R)	30	11	5	14	40	36	+4	38	2014–15 Algerian Ligue Professionnelle 2
15	ASO Chlef (R)	30	8	12	10	24	28	−4	36	2014–15 Algerian Ligue Professionnelle 2
16	USM Bel Abbès (R)	30	8	9	13	19	28	−9	33	2014–15 Algerian Ligue Professionnelle 2

Updated to match(es) played on 29 May 2015. Source: DZFoot
Rules for classification: 1) points; 2) head-to-head points; 3) head-to-head goal difference; 4) goal difference; 5) total goals; 6) fairplay ranking; 7) playoff
(R) Relegated

==== Results summary ====
Overall								Home						Away					
Pld	W	D	L	GF	GA	GD	Pts	W	D	L	GF	GA	GD	W	D	L	GF	GA	GD
30	11	5	14	40	36	+4	38	10	1	4	28	12	+16	1	4	10	12	24	−12

Last updated: 21 December 2014.
Source: Competitive matches

==== Results by round ====
Round	1	2	3	4	5	6	7	8	9	10	11	12	13	14	15	16	17	18	19	20	21	22	23	24	25	26	27	28	29	30
Ground	A	H	A	H	A	H	A	H	A	A	H	A	H	A	H	H	A	H	A	H	A	H	A	H	H	A	H	A	H	A
Result	W	L	L	D	W	D	W	L	L	W	L	W	L	L	L	L	W	D	W	L	W	L	L	D	W	W	L	D	L	W
Position	4	7	9	11	6	7	4	7	11	6	8	7	8	10	13	14	12	12	10	11	9	11	14	14	14	12	13	14	15	14

Updated to match(es) played on 21 December 2014. Source: Competitive matches
A = Away; H = Home; W = Win; D = Draw; L = Loss

==== Matches ====
16 August 2014 1	MC El Eulma	2–1	MC Alger	El Eulma
18:00	Derrardja 13', 17'	Report	90+2' Hachoud	Stadium: Stade Messaoud Zougar; Referee: Benbraham, Bouchebah, Allaoua

23 August 2014 2	USM El Harrach	2–1	MC El Eulma	El Harrach
16:00	Abid 70'; Benachour 88'	Report	11' Derrardja	Stadium: Stade 1er Novembre 1954; Referee: Bachir, Etchiali, El Hadj Said

13 September 2014 3	MC El Eulma	0–1	ES Sétif	El Eulma
18:00		Report	64' Ziaya	Stadium: Stade Messaoud Zougar; Referee: Bichari, Salouadji, Rachdi

19 September 2014 4	CS Constantine	2–2	MC El Eulma	Constantine
17:45	Boulemdaïs 26' (pen.); Sameur 43'	Report	37', 57' Chenihi	Stadium: Stade Mohamed Hamlaoui; Referee: Halalchi, Bachir, Doulache

27 September 2014 5	MC El Eulma	4–1	CR Belouizdad	El Eulma
18:00	Hamiti 10' (pen.); Derrardja 54', 89'; Abbès 80'	Report	45' (pen.) Bougueroua	Stadium: Stade Messaoud Zougar; Attendance: 0 (close doors); Referee: Boukhalfa, Benali, Zahrouni

2 October 2014 6	RC Arbaâ	0–0	MC El Eulma	Larbaâ
16:00		Report		Stadium: Stade Ismaïl-Makhlouf; Referee: Amalou, Azrine, Rachedi

18 October 2014 7	MC El Eulma	3–2	JS Kabylie	El Eulma
18:00	Derrardja 34' (pen.), 44', 78'	Report	87', 88' Abdul-Raheem	Stadium: Stade Messaoud Zougar; Referee: Bekouassa, Bounoua, Bahloul

25 October 2014 8	MC Oran	2–1	MC El Eulma	Oran
17:45	Chérif 20'; Za'abia 46'	Report	24' Chenihi	Stadium: Stade Ahmed Zabana; Referee: Bensinane, Rimouche, Belbachir

1 November 2014 9	MC El Eulma	1–2	USM Alger	El Eulma
16:00	Hamiti 33'; Belkhiter (yellow card) 44'; Maïza (yellow card) 57' (yellow-red card) 70'; Namane (yellow card) 90'	Report	27' Koudri; 66' Belaïli; (yellow card) 20' Meftah; (yellow card) 23' Laïfaoui; (yellow card) 73' Khoualed	Stadium: Stade Messaoud Zougar; Attendance: 0 (close doors); Referee: Bachir, Etchiali, Hadj Saïd

8 November 2014 10	MC El Eulma	2–0	NA Hussein Dey	El Eulma
18:00	Derrardja 40'; Chenihi 59'	Report		Stadium: Stade Messaoud Zougar; Referee: Chebana, Allaoua, Benbraham

22 November 2014 11	USM Bel-Abbès	2–1	MC El Eulma	Sidi Bel Abbès
18:00	Abdat 60'; Ghezzali 88'	Report	45' Chenihi	Stadium: Stade 24 Fevrier 1956; Referee: Hillalchi, Doulache, Tazrout

29 November 2014 12	MC El Eulma	2–1	ASO Chlef	El Eulma
17:45	Bouzama 39'; Hemiti 60'	Report	90' Daham	Stadium: Stade Messaoud Zougar; Referee: Mial, Semsoum, Idir

6 December 2014 13	JS Saoura	1–0	MC El Eulma	Béchar
15:00	Sayah 48' (pen.)	Report		Stadium: Stade 20 Août 1955; Referee: Bichari, Gourari, Selouati

20 December 2014 14	MC El Eulma	1–2	MO Béjaïa	El Eulma
18:00	Hamiti 72'	Report	76' Banouh; 90+4' Chatal	Stadium: Stade Messaoud Zougar; Referee: Houasnia, Boulekrinet, Badeche

30 December 2014 15	ASM Oran	1–0	MC El Eulma	Oran
16:00	Belalem 87'	Report		Stadium: Stade Ahmed Zabana; Referee: Bouslimani, Belbachir, Rimouche

January 2015 16	MC Alger	4–0	MC El Eulma	Algiers
17:00	Djallit 29' (pen.); Mendouga 52'; Gourmi 79', 85'	Report		Stadium: Stade Omar Hammadi; Referee: Aouina, Benaissa, Chenaoua

January 2015 17	MC El Eulma	4–1	USM El Harrach	El Eulma
16:00	Bouzama 24'; Derrardja 45'; Hamiti 55'; Kara 90+3'	Report	56' Ziane Cherif	Stadium: Stade Messaoud Zougar; Referee: Benbrahem, Alaoua, Chelaoui

31 January 2014 18	ES Sétif	1–1	MC El Eulma	Sétif
15:00	Belameiri 13'	Report	43' Derrardja	Stadium: Stade 8 Mai 1945; Referee: Halalchi, Brahim, Doulache

6 February 2015 19	MC El Eulma	3–0	CS Constantine	El Eulma
16:00	Maïza 55'; Hemitti 62'; Derrardja 74'	Report		Stadium: Stade Messaoud Zougar; Referee: Bichari, Gourari, Belbachir

10 February 2015 20	CR Belouizdad	1–0	MC El Eulma	Algiers
16:00	Draoui 37'	Report		Stadium: Stade 20 Août 1955; Referee: Benouza, Omari, Bechirène

24 February 2015 21	MC El Eulma	2–0	RC Arbaâ	El Eulma
16:00	Abbès 27'; Derrardja 31'	Report		Stadium: Stade Messaoud Zougar; Referee: Boukhalfa, Atachali, Zerhouni

6 March 2015 22	JS Kabylie	1–0	MC El Eulma	Tizi Ouzou
16:00	Mekkaoui 88'	Report		Stadium: Stade du 1er Novembre 1954; Referee: Aouina, Benaïssa, Chenaoua

20 March 2015 23	MC El Eulma	0–1	MC Oran	El Eulma
17:00		Report	75' Berradja	Stadium: Stade Messaoud Zougar; Referee: Houasnia, Boulekrinet, Badache

10 April 2015 24	USM Alger	1–1	MC El Eulma	Algiers
18:00	Manucho 90+5'	Report	Hamiti 28'	Stadium: Stade Omar Hammadi; Referee: Ghorbal, Sarradj, Cherchar

14 April 2015 25	NA Hussein Dey	1–2	MC El Eulma	Algiers
17:00	Benayad 86'	Report	37' Hammami; 75' Kara	Stadium: Stade 20 Août 1955; Referee: Abid Charef, Tanem, Boulfelfel

25 April 2015 26	MC El Eulma	1–0	USM Bel-Abbès	El Eulma
17:00	Derrardja 74'	Report		Stadium: Stade Messaoud Zougar; Referee: Arab, Bazine, Hamlaoui

9 May 2015 27	ASO Chlef	2–1	MC El Eulma	Chlef
17:00	Tedjar 21'; Namani 56'	Report	80' Chenihi	Stadium: Stade Mohamed Boumezrag; Referee: Boukouassa, Bourouba, Rachedi

16 May 2015 28	MC El Eulma	0–0	JS Saoura	El Eulma
17:00		Report		Stadium: Stade Messaoud Zougar; Attendance: 0 (close doors); Referee: Houasnia, Itchiali, Serradj

23 May 2015 29	MO Béjaïa	3–2	MC El Eulma	Béjaïa
17:00	Hamzaoui 2', 31'; Zerdab 65' (pen.)	Report	40' Maïza; 45' (pen.) Abbès	Stadium: Stade de l'Unité Maghrébine; Referee: Abid Charef, Tamen, Boulfelfel

29 May 2015 30	MC El Eulma	3–0	ASM Oran	El Eulma
17:00	Derrardja 41', 46'; Chenihi 66'	Report		Stadium: Stade Messaoud Zougar; Referee: Amalou, Kennoune, Brahimi

== Algerian Cup ==
13 December 2014 Round of 64	MC El Eulma	3–2 (a.e.t.)	A Bou Saada	El Eulma
14:00	Kara 86'; Derrardja 90+4' (pen.); Kadri 105'	Repport	8' Mesbah; 65' Laâraf	Stadium: Stade Messaoud Zougar; Referee: Necib, Mekhlouf, Benaceur

27 December 2014 Round of 32	MC El Eulma	2–2 (a.e.t.) (1–4 p)	JS Kabylie	El Eulma
16:00	Bouzama 10'; Hamiti 70' (pen.)	Repport	6' Khodja; 26' Aiboud	Stadium: Stade Messaoud Zougar; Referee: Boukhalfa, Benali, Zerhouni
	Penalties
	Derrardja (penalty scored); Hamiti (penalty missed); Maïza (penalty missed)		(penalty scored) Abdul-Raheem; (penalty scored) Mekehout; (penalty scored) Ziti (penalty scored)

== Champions League ==
=== Preliminary round ===
14 February 2015 first leg	MC El Eulma (Algeria)	1–0	(Ethiopia) Saint George SC	El Eulma
18:00 UTC+1	Hamiti 45' (pen.)	Report		Stadium: Messaoud Zougar; Referee: Nasrallah Jawadi (Tunisia)

1 March 2015 Second leg	Saint George SC (Ethiopia)	2–1	(Algeria) MC El Eulma	Addis Ababa
16:00 UTC+3	B. Assefa 45'; Adane 67'	Report	70' Tembeng	Stadium: Addis Ababa; Referee: Farah Aden (Djibouti)

=== First round ===
14 March 2015 first leg	MC El Eulma (Algeria)	0–0	(Ghana) Asante Kotoko	El Eulma
18:00 UTC+1		Report		Stadium: Messaoud Zougar; Referee: Néant Alioum (Cameroon)

5 April 2015 Second leg	Asante Kotoko (Ghana)	1–2	(Algeria) MC El Eulma	Kumasi
15:00 UTC±0	Owusu 41'	Report	65' Derrardja; 90+6' Hamiti	Stadium: Kumasi Sports; Referee: El Fadil Mohamed Hussein (Sudan)

=== Second round ===
19 April 2015 first leg	MC El Eulma (Algeria)	1–0	(Tunisia) CS Sfaxien	El Eulma
18:00 UTC+1	Derrardja 27'	Report		Stadium: Messaoud Zougar; Referee: Malang Diedhiou (Senegal)

3 May 2015 Second leg	CS Sfaxien (Tunisia)	1–0 (6–7 p)	(Algeria) MC El Eulma	Sfax
19:15 UTC+1	Hannachi 46'	Report		Stadium: Taïeb Mhiri; Referee: Bamlak Tessema Weyesa (Ethiopia)
	Penalties
	Maâloul (penalty scored); Louati (penalty scored); Meriah (penalty scored); Khenissi (penalty scored); Hannachi (penalty scored); El Bahri (penalty scored); Challouf (penalty missed)		(penalty scored) Hamiti; (penalty scored) Derrardja; (penalty scored) Belhadi; (penalty scored) Abbes; (penalty scored) Namane; (penalty scored) Maïza; (penalty scored) Mbingui

== Squad information ==
=== Playing statistics ===
No.	Pos	Nat	Player	Total		Ligue 1		Algerian Cup		Champions League	
No.	Pos	Nat	Player	Apps	Goals	Apps	Goals	Apps	Goals	Apps	Goals
Goalkeepers
1	GK	(Algeria) ALG	Mohamed Ousserir	5	0	0	0	0	0	5	0
16	GK	(Algeria) ALG	Tarek Mahsas	1	0	0	0	0	0	1	0
30	GK	(Algeria) ALG	Hichem Layachi	0	0	0	0	0	0	0	0
Defenders
	DF	(Algeria) ALG	Abdelraouf Baâziz	0	0	0	0	0	0	0	0
	DF	(Algeria) ALG	Hichem Benamar	0	0	0	0	0	0	0	0
3	DF	(Algeria) ALG	Khaled Bouzama	2	0	0	0	0	0	2	0
5	DF	(Algeria) ALG	Adel Namane	3	0	0	0	0	0	3	0
21	DF	(Algeria) ALG	Tarek Zeghidi	5	0	0	0	0	0	5	0
6	DF	(Algeria) ALG	Mohamed Belhadi	4	0	0	0	0	0	4	0
	DF	(Algeria) ALG	Ishak Benameur	0	0	0	0	0	0	0	0
23	DF	(Algeria) ALG	Adel Maïza	6	0	0	0	0	0	6	0
14	DF	(Algeria) ALG	Nassim Oussalah	2	0	0	0	0	0	2	0
Midfielders
10	MF	(Algeria) ALG	Nacer Hammami	5	0	0	0	0	0	5	0
4	MF	(Algeria) ALG	Sofiane Bouterbiat	0	0	0	0	0	0	0	0
	MF	(Mali) MLI	Yahia Coulibaly	0	0	0	0	0	0	0	0
	MF	(Algeria) ALG	Mohamed Rachi	0	0	0	0	0	0	0	0
7	MF	(Algeria) ALG	Ismail Bentayeb	6	0	0	0	0	0	6	0
24	MF	(Algeria) ALG	Ibrahim Chenihi	6	0	0	0	0	0	6	0
	MF	(Algeria) ALG	Mehdi Ghazi	0	0	0	0	0	0	0	0
8	MF	(Algeria) ALG	Alaeddine Labiod	0	0	0	0	0	0	0	0
2	MF	(Algeria) ALG	Mokhtar Belkhiter	6	0	0	0	0	0	6	0
12	FW	(Cameroon) CMR	Azongha Tembeng	5	1	0	0	0	0	5	1
Forwards
17	FW	(Algeria) ALG	Walid Derrardja	6	2	0	0	0	0	6	2
31	FW	(Algeria) ALG	Abdelmalek Abbès	5	0	0	0	0	0	5	0
9	FW	(Algeria) ALG	Farès Hamiti	5	2	0	0	0	0	5	2
11	FW	(Algeria) ALG	Ahmed Kara	3	0	0	0	0	0	3	0
32	FW	(Algeria) ALG	Younès Kadri	1	0	0	0	0	0	1	0
	FW	(Gabon) GAB	Samson Mbingui	4	0	0	0	0	0	4	0
Players transferred out during the season

Last updated: 30 November 2017
Source: fr.soccerway.com

=== Goalscorers ===
Includes all competitive matches. The list is sorted alphabetically by surname when total goals are equal.

No.	Nat.	Player	Pos.	Ligue 1	Cup	Champions League	TOTAL
17	(Algeria)	Walid Derrardja	FW	16	1	2	19
24	(Algeria)	Ibrahim Chenihi	MF	7	0	0	7
9	(Algeria)	Farès Hamiti	FW	7	1	2	10
31	(Algeria)	Abdelmalek Abbès	FW	3	0	0	3
3	(Algeria)	Khaled Bouzama	DF	2	1	0	3
11	(Algeria)	Ahmed Kara	FW	2	1	0	3
23	(Algeria)	Adel Maïza	DF	2	0	0	2
32	(Algeria)	Younès Kadri	FW	0	1	0	1
12	(Cameroon)	Azongha Tembeng	MF	0	0	1	1
10	(Algeria)	Nacer Hammami	MF	1	0	0	1
Own Goals				0	0	0	0
Totals				40	5	5	50

== Transfers ==
=== In ===
Date	Pos	Player	From club	Transfer fee	Source
28 December 2014	MF	(Gabon) Samson Mbingui	MC Alger	Free transfer	LPDB Officiel
