= 2013–14 MC El Eulma season =

MC El Eulma
2013–14 season
- Chairman: Arras Herrada
- Head coach: Abdelkader Yaïche (until 11 December 2013); Hans Agbo (interim) (from 12 December 2013} (until 31 December 2013} Jules Accorsi (from 10 January 2014}
- Stadium: Stade Messaoud Zougar
- Ligue 1: 4th
- Algerian Cup: Round of 64
- Top goalscorer: League: Farès Hamiti (13); All: Farès Hemiti (13)

In the 2013–14 season, MC El Eulma is competing in the Ligue 1 for the 6th season, as well as the Algerian Cup. It is their 6th consecutive season in the top flight of Algerian football. They will be competing in Ligue 1, and the Algerian Cup.

== Squad list ==
Players and squad numbers last updated on 18 November 2010.
Note: Flags indicate national team as has been defined under FIFA eligibility rules. Players may hold more than one non-FIFA nationality.

No.	Nat.	Position	Name	Date of Birth (Age)	Signed from
Goalkeepers
Defenders
Midfielders
Forwards

== Competitions ==
=== Overview ===
Competition	Record								Started round	Final position / round	First match	Last match
Competition	G	W	D	L	GF	GA	GD	Win %	Started round	Final position / round	First match	Last match
Ligue 1	30	13	9	8	38	28	+10	43.33	—N/a	4th	24 August 2013	22 May 2014
Algerian Cup	1	0	0	1	2	3	−1	0.00	Round of 64		7 December 2013	
Total	31	13	9	9	40	31	+9	41.94				

Updated to match played 9 May 2017
Source: Competitions

== League table ==
Pos	Team	Pld	W	D	L	GF	GA	GD	Pts	Qualification or relegation
2	JS Kabylie (Note: JS Kabylie, the 2013–14 Algerian Ligue Professionnelle 1 runner-up, was suspended by the CAF for two years due to the death of Albert Ebossé during their league home match against USM Alger. On 11 February 2015, the CAS overturned the suspension. However, their replacement MC El Eulma continued to represent Algeria in the 2015 CAF Champions League.)	30	15	9	6	39	21	+18	54	
3	ES Sétif	30	15	8	7	40	27	+13	53	Qualification for the Champions League first round
4	MC El Eulma	30	13	9	8	38	28	+10	48	Qualification for the Champions League preliminary round
5	USM El Harrach (Note: USM El Harrach would have qualified for the CAF Confederation Cup preliminary round by finishing fourth in the 2013–14 Algerian Ligue Professionnelle 1, but due to the penalty imposed on them by CAF after their withdrawal from the 2014 CAF Champions League, they could not participate.)	30	13	8	9	34	27	+7	47	
6	MC Alger	30	13	6	11	26	25	+1	45	Qualification for the Confederation Cup preliminary round

Updated to match(es) played on 22 May 2014. Source: DZFoot
Rules for classification: 1) points; 2) head-to-head points; 3) head-to-head goal difference; 4) goal difference; 5) total goals; 6) fairplay ranking; 7) playoff.

=== Results summary ===
Overall								Home						Away					
Pld	W	D	L	GF	GA	GD	Pts	W	D	L	GF	GA	GD	W	D	L	GF	GA	GD
30	13	9	8	38	29	+9	48	12	1	2	27	12	+15	1	8	6	11	17	−6

Last updated: 29 December 2014.
Source: Competitive matches

=== Results by round ===
Round	1	2	3	4	5	6	7	8	9	10	11	12	13	14	15	16	17	18	19	20	21	22	23	24	25	26	27	28	29	30
Ground	H	A	H	A	H	A	A	H	A	H	A	H	A	H	A	A	H	A	H	A	H	H	A	H	A	H	A	H	A	H
Result	L	D	L	W	D	D	D	W	L	W	D	W	D	W	D	L	W	L	W	D	W	W	L	W	L	W	D	W	L	W
Position																														

Updated to match(es) played on 29 December 2014. Source: Competitive matches
A = Away; H = Home; W = Win; D = Draw; L = Loss

=== Matches ===
24 August 2013 Round 1	MC El Eulma	3–4	JS Kabylie	El Eulma
18:00	Chenihi 17'; Remache 70' (o.g.); Hamiti 75'	Report	30', 84' Yesli; 58' Rial; 65' Ebossé Bodjongo	Stadium: Stade Messaoud Zougar; Referee: Abderrezzak Arab

31 August 2013 Round 2	CA Bordj Bou Arréridj	0–0	MC El Eulma	Bordj Bou Arréridj
17:45		Report		Stadium: Stade 20 Août 1955; Referee: Redouane Necib

3 September 2013 Round 3	MC El Eulma	1–2	JS Saoura	El Eulma
18:00	Berchiche 73'	Report	8' Bagayoko; 90+1' Zaoui	Stadium: Stade Messaoud Zougar; Referee: Mokhtar Amalou

14 September 2013 Round 4	MO Béjaïa	1–2	MC El Eulma	Béjaïa
18:00	Semani 72'	Report	62' Chenihi; 86' Hamiti	Stadium: Stade de l'Unité Maghrébine; Referee: Djamel Haimoudi

21 September 2013 Round 5	MC El Eulma	0–0	USM El Harrach	El Eulma
18:00		Report		Stadium: Stade Messaoud Zougar; Referee: Mohamed Saïdi

28 September 2013 Round 6	CS Constantine	0–0	MC El Eulma	Constantine
18:00		Report		Stadium: Stade Mohamed Hamlaoui; Referee: Mohamed Benouza

5 October 2013 Round 7	JSM Béjaïa	1–1	MC El Eulma	Béjaïa
18:00	Coulibaly 35'	Report	39' (pen.) Hamiti	Stadium: Stade de l'Unité Maghrébine; Referee: Mohamed Bachir

19 October 2013 Round 8	MC El Eulma	1–0	USM Alger	El Eulma
18:00	Zeghidi 55'	Report		Stadium: Stade Messaoud Zougar; Referee: Mohamed Ghorbal

26 October 2013 Round 9	CRB Aïn Fakroun	1–0	MC El Eulma	Aïn M'lila
15:00	Daïra 45+2' (pen.)	Report		Stadium: Stade des Frères Demane Debbih; Referee: Amine Sekhraoui

1 November 2013 Round 10	MC El Eulma	2–1	MC Oran	El Eulma
16:45	Hamiti 42'; Derrardja 45+2'	Report	43' Mokhtari	Stadium: Stade Messaoud Zougar; Referee: Farouk Mial

9 November 2013 Round 11	CR Belouizdad	1–1	MC El Eulma	Algiers
15:00	Hanifi 23' (pen.)	Report	57' Hamiti	Stadium: Stade 20 Août 1955; Referee: Mohamed Benouza

23 November 2013 Round 12	MC El Eulma	2–1	RC Arbaâ	El Eulma
18:00	Chenihi 32'; Hamiti 83' (pen.)	Report	42' Raït	Stadium: Stade Messaoud Zougar; Referee: Merzak Halalchi

29 November 2013 Round 13	ES Sétif	0–0	MC El Eulma	Sétif
16:45		Report		Stadium: Stade 8 Mai 1945; Referee: Mokhtar Amalou

14 December 2013 Round 14	MC El Eulma	2–1	ASO Chlef	El Eulma
15:00	Chenihi 6'; Zeghidi 19'	Report	56' Meliani	Stadium: Stade Messaoud Zougar; Referee: Djamel Haimoudi

28 December 2013 Round 15	MC Alger	0–0	MC El Eulma	Algiers
16:00		Report		Stadium: Stade Omar Hamadi; Referee: Youssef Zerrouki

18 January 2014 Round 16	JS Kabylie	2–0	MC El Eulma	Tizi Ouzou
16:00	Zubya 15'; Ebossé Bodjongo 47'	Report		Stadium: Stade du 1er Novembre 1954; Referee: Mohamed Ghorbal

31 January 2014 Round 17	MC El Eulma	1–0	CA Bordj Bou Arréridj	El Eulma
16:00	Zeghidi 5'	Report		Stadium: Stade Messaoud Zougar; Referee: Mohamed Bichari

8 February 2014 Round 18	JS Saoura	3–2	MC El Eulma	Béchar
15:00	Zaoui 45+3'; Belkheir 74'; Hamzaoui 88'	Report	36' Chenihi; 90' Hamiti	Stadium: Stade 20 Août 1955; Referee: Sofiane Bousseter

15 February 2014 Round 19	MC El Eulma	2–0	MO Béjaïa	El Eulma
15:00	Hamiti 7' (pen.); Derrardja 82'	Report		Stadium: Stade Messaoud Zougar; Referee: Mohamed Benouza

22 February 2014 Round 20	USM El Harrach	2–2	MC El Eulma	Algiers
15:00	Abid 11', 26'	Report	56', 68' Derrardja	Stadium: Stade 1er Novembre 1954; Referee: Mehdi Abid Charef

28 February 2014 Round 21	MC El Eulma	4–0	CS Constantine	El Eulma
16:00	Hamiti 14', 44' (pen.); Berchiche 34'; Hammami 90+3'	Report		Stadium: Stade Messaoud Zougar; Referee: Mohamed Saïdi

8 March 2014 Round 22	MC El Eulma	2–1	JSM Béjaïa	El Eulma
15:00	Hamiti 7' (pen.), 24'	Report	81' Zeghli	Stadium: Stade Messaoud Zougar; Referee: Youssef Zerrouki

15 March 2014 Round 23	USM Alger	2–1	MC El Eulma	Algiers
18:00	Meftah 81'; Seguer 84'	Report	76' I. Benettayeb	Stadium: Stade Omar Hamadi; Referee: Mohamed Bachir

22 March 2014 Round 24	MC El Eulma	3–1	CRB Aïn Fakroun	El Eulma
16:00	Derrardja 18'; Zeghidi 21'; Kadri 35'	Report	66' Amroune	Stadium: Stade Messaoud Zougar; Referee: Djamel Haimoudi

26 April 2014 Round 25	MC Oran	1–0	MC El Eulma	Oran
15:00	Nessakh 83' (pen.)	Report		Stadium: Ahmed Zabana Stadium; Referee: Mohamed Bichari

3 May 2014 Round 26	MC El Eulma	1–0	CR Belouizdad	El Eulma
18:00	Chenihi 56'	Report		Stadium: Stade Messaoud Zougar; Referee: Redouane Necib

10 May 2014 Round 27	RC Arbaâ	1–1	MC El Eulma	Larbaâ
17:00	Bougueroua 75'	Report	6' Derrardja	Stadium: Stade Ismaïl Makhlouf; Referee: Mohamed Sahraoui

13 May 2014 Round 28	MC El Eulma	2–1	ES Sétif	El Eulma
18:00	Hamiti 11'; Derrardja 85'	Report	66' Nadji	Stadium: Stade Messaoud Zougar; Referee: Abderrezzak Arab

17 May 2014 Round 29	ASO Chlef	2–1	MC El Eulma	Chlef
17:00	Lakhdari 75'; Daham 89'	Report	90' Benachour	Stadium: Stade Mohamed Boumezrag; Referee: Ahmed Bouzrar

24 May 2014 Round 30	MC El Eulma	1–0	MC Alger	El Eulma
17:00	Belkhiter 78'	Report		Stadium: Stade Messaoud Zougar; Referee: Mohamed Bachir

== Algerian Cup ==
7 December 2013 Round of 64	JSM Tiaret	3–2	MC El Eulma	Tiaret
14:30				Stadium: Ahmed Kaïd Stadium

== Squad information ==
=== Playing statistics ===
No.	Pos	Nat	Player	Total		Ligue 1		Algerian Cup	
No.	Pos	Nat	Player	Apps	Goals	Apps	Goals	Apps	Goals
Goalkeepers
1	GK	(Algeria) ALG	Mohamed Ousserir	22	0	22	0	0	0
16	GK	(Algeria) ALG	Tarek Mahsas	9	0	9	0	0	0
Defenders
4	DF	(Algeria) ALG	Koceila Berchiche	29	2	29	2	0	0
14	DF	(Algeria) ALG	Nassim Oussalah	19	0	19	0	0	0
15	DF	(Algeria) ALG	Abdeslam Mebarakou	13	0	13	0	0	0
3	DF	(Algeria) ALG	Khaled Bouzama	11	0	11	0	0	0
21	DF	(Algeria) ALG	Tarek Zeghidi	27	4	27	4	0	0
5	DF	(Algeria) ALG	Adel Namane	14	0	14	0	0	0
6	DF	(Algeria) ALG	Mohamed Belhadi	16	0	16	0	0	0
Midfielders
18	MF	(Algeria) ALG	Messaoud Gharbei	19	0	19	0	0	0
7	MF	(Algeria) ALG	Ismail Bentayeb	27	1	27	1	0	0
10	MF	(Algeria) ALG	Nacer Hammami	27	1	27	1	0	0
24	MF	(Algeria) ALG	Ibrahim Chenihi	30	6	30	6	0	0
8	MF	(Algeria) ALG	Alaeddine Labiod	2	0	2	0	0	0
19	MF	(Mali) MLI	Yahya Coulibaly	2	0	2	0	0	0
2	MF	(Algeria) ALG	Mokhtar Belkhiter	26	1	26	1	0	0
12	MF	(Algeria) ALG	Sofiane Benachour	14	1	14	1	0	0
22	MF	(Algeria) ALG	Mehdi Ghazi	6	0	6	0	0	0
Forwards
	FW	(Algeria) ALG	Karim Benyamina	6	0	6	0	0	0
17	FW	(Algeria) ALG	Walid Derrardja	28	7	28	7	0	0
9	FW	(Algeria) ALG	Farès Hamiti	28	13	28	13	0	0
32	FW	(Algeria) ALG	Younès Kadri	14	1	14	1	0	0
11	FW	(Algeria) ALG	Mekhlouf Keffi	4	0	4	0	0	0
31	FW	(Algeria) ALG	Abdelmalek Abbes	16	0	16	0	0	0
23	FW	(Algeria) ALG	Fatrie Sakhi	2	0	2	0	0	0
	FW	(Algeria) ALG	Kebchi	1	0	1	0	0	0
Players transferred out during the season

Last updated: 10 November 2017
Source: fr.soccerway.com

== Transfers ==
=== In ===
Date	Pos	Player	From club	Transfer fee	Source
5 June 2013	GK	(Algeria) Tarek Mahsas	(France) Paris FC	Free transfer	
1 July 2013	DF	(Algeria) Mokhtar Belkhiter	USM Blida	Undisclosed	
1 July 2013	MF	(Algeria) Sofiane Benachour	Paradou AC	Undisclosed	
1 July 2013	FW	(Algeria) Mekhlouf Keffi	MC Saïda	Undisclosed	
1 July 2013	FW	(Algeria) Fatrie Sakhi	(France) US Quevilly	Free transfer	
7 July 2013	MF	(Algeria) Alaeddine Labiod	USM Bel-Abbès	Free transfer	
8 July 2013	GK	(Algeria) Mohamed Ousserir	CR Belouizdad	Free transfer	
12 July 2013	DF	(Algeria) Mohamed Belhadi	USM Bel-Abbès	Undisclosed	
28 November 2013	FW	(Algeria) Karim Benyamina	(Germany) Karlsruher SC	Free transfer	
8 January 2014	MF	(Algeria) Mehdi Ghazi	(Turkey) Antalyaspor B	Undisclosed	

=== Out ===
Date	Pos	Player	To club	Transfer fee	Source
30 July 2013	FW	(Algeria) Ramzi Bourakba	CR Belouizdad	Free transfer	
