= 2015–16 MC El Eulma season =

MC El Eulma
2015–16 season
- Chairman: Embarek Bouden
- Head coach: Jules Accorsi; Kamel Mouassa (from 9 December 2015) (until 22 February 2016)
- Stadium: Stade Messaoud Zougar
- Ligue 2: 5th
- Algerian Cup: Round of 32
- CAF Champions League: Group stage
- Top goalscorer: League: Fethi Noubli (9); All: Fethi Noubli (10)

In the 2015–16 season, MC El Eulma is competing in the Ligue 2 for the 8th season, as well as the Algerian Cup. They will be competing in Ligue 1, and the Algerian Cup.

== Competitions ==
=== Overview ===
Competition	Record								Started round	Final position / round	First match	Last match
Competition	G	W	D	L	GF	GA	GD	Win %	Started round	Final position / round	First match	Last match
Ligue 2	30	10	10	10	28	25	+3	33.33	—N/a	5th	14 August 2015	6 May 2016
Algerian Cup	2	1	1	0	2	1	+1	50.00	Round of 64	Round of 32	18 December 2015	8 January 2016
CAF Champions League	6	0	1	5	5	11	−6	0.00	Group stage		26 June 2015	11 September 2015
Total	38	11	12	15	35	38	−3	28.95				

=== Ligue 2 ===
==== League table ====
Pos	Team	Pld	W	D	L	GF	GA	GD	Pts	Qualification or relegation
3	USM Bel Abbès (P)	30	12	13	5	27	18	+9	49	2016–17 Algerian Ligue Professionnelle 1
4	Paradou AC	30	11	13	6	39	25	+14	46	
5	MC El Eulma	30	10	10	10	28	25	+3	40	
6	JSM Skikda	30	10	10	10	35	33	+2	40	
7	A Bou Saâda	30	11	7	12	29	31	−2	40	

Updated to match(es) played on 6 May 2016. Source: DZFOOT.COM
Rules for classification: 1) points; 2) goal difference; 3) number of goals scored.
(P) Promoted

==== Results summary ====
Overall								Home						Away					
Pld	W	D	L	GF	GA	GD	Pts	W	D	L	GF	GA	GD	W	D	L	GF	GA	GD
30	10	10	10	28	25	+3	40	8	5	2	21	10	+11	2	5	8	7	15	−8

Last updated: 31 January 2015.
Source: Competitive matches

==== Results by round ====
Round	1	2	3	4	5	6	7	8	9	10	11	12	13	14	15	16	17	18	19	20	21	22	23	24	25	26	27	28	29	30
Ground	H	A	H	A	H	A	H	A	H	A	H	A	A	H	A	A	H	A	H	A	H	A	H	A	H	A	H	H	A	H
Result	W	L	D	L	L	D	D	W	W	D	W	D	D	W	L	L	D	W	L	L	D	L	D	D	W	L	W	W	L	W
Position	2	9	9	11	15	15	15	11	7	8	5	7	7	5	7	9	8	7	7	10	10	11	11	12	10	11	9	5	9	5

Updated to match(es) played on 31 January 2015. Source: Competitive matches
A = Away; H = Home; W = Win; D = Draw; L = Loss

=== Matches ===
Win Draw Loss

14 August 2015 Round 1	MC El Eulma	3–2	MC Saïda	El Eulma
17:00	Hamiti 10', 27'; Namane 38'	Report	Hamidi 12', 26'	Stadium: Stade Messaoud Zougar; Referee: Helalchi, Toulach, Abben

25 August 2015 Round 2	CA Bordj Bou Arreridj	3–1	MC El Eulma	Bordj Bou Arreridj
18:00	Hadiouche 8'; Bouguelmouna 23'; Hamimed 56'	Report	Abbes 36'	Stadium: Stade 20 Août 1955

29 August 2015 Round 3	MC El Eulma	2–2	AS Khroub	El Eulma
17:30	Korichi 10'; Laouafi 77'	Report	Belhamri 52', 90'	Stadium: Stade Messaoud Zougar

15 September 2015 Round 4	ASO Chlef	1–0	MC El Eulma	Chlef
16:00	[[]]	Report		Stadium: Stade Mohamed Boumezrag

19 September 2015 Round 5	MC El Eulma	0–1	USM Bel Abbès	El Eulma
18:00		Report	Touil 67'	Stadium: Stade Messaoud Zougar

28 September 2015 Round 6	CA Batna	0–0	MC El Eulma	Batna
19:00		Report		Stadium: Stade 1er Novembre 1954

3 October 2015 Round 7	MC El Eulma	1–1	US Chaouia	El Eulma
18:00	[[]]	Report	[[]]	Stadium: Stade Messaoud Zougar

15 October 2015 Round 8	JSM Skikda	1–2	MC El Eulma	Skikda
16:00	[[]]	Report	[[]]; [[]]	Stadium: Stade 20 Août 1955

23 October 2015 Round 9	MC El Eulma	3–0	JSM Béjaïa	El Eulma
16:00	[[]]; [[]]; [[]]	Report		Stadium: Stade Messaoud Zougar

30 October 2015 Round 10	Paradou AC	0–0	MC El Eulma	Algiers
15:00		Report		Stadium: Stade Omar Hamadi

7 November 2015 Round 11	MC El Eulma	1–0	A Bou Saâda	El Eulma
18:00	[[]]	Report		Stadium: Stade Messaoud Zougar

20 November 2015 Round 12	CRB Aïn Fakroun	0–0	MC El Eulma	Aïn Fakroun
15:00		Report		Stadium: Stade Allag Abderrahmane

27 November 2015 Round 13	USMM Hadjout	0–0	MC El Eulma	Hadjout
15:00		Report		Stadium: Stade 5 Juillet 1962; Attendance: 0 (close doors); Referee: Oukil, Zerhouni, Bourrechou

12 December 2015 Round 14	MC El Eulma	3–2	OM Arzew	El Eulma
16:00	[[]]; [[]]; [[]]	Report	[[]]; [[]]	Stadium: Stade Messaoud Zougar

25 December 2015 Round 15	Olympique de Médéa	2–1	MC El Eulma	Médéa
15:00	[[]]; [[]]	Report	[[]]	Stadium: Stade Imam Lyes

15 January 2016 Round 16	MC Saïda	1–0	MC El Eulma	Saïda
15:00	[[]]	Report		Stadium: Stade 13 Avril 1958

23 January 2016 Round 17	MC El Eulma	0–0	CA Bordj Bou Arreridj	El Eulma
16:00		Report		Stadium: Stade Messaoud Zougar

29 January 2016 Round 18	AS Khroub	0–1	MC El Eulma	El Khroub
15:00		Report	[[]]	Stadium: Stade Abed Hamdani

5 February 2016 Round 19	MC El Eulma	0–1	ASO Chlef	El Eulma
16:00		Report	[[]]	Stadium: Stade Messaoud Zougar

12 February 2016 Round 20	USM Bel Abbès	1–0	MC El Eulma	Sidi Bel Abbès
15:00	Bennai 3'	Report		Stadium: Stade 24 Fevrier 1956

27 February 2016 Round 21	MC El Eulma	1–1	CA Batna	El Eulma
15:00	[[]]	Report	[[]]	Stadium: Stade Messaoud Zougar

4 March 2016 Round 22	US Chaouia	1–0	MC El Eulma	Oum El Bouaghi
15:00	[[]]	Report		Stadium: Stade Hassouna Zerdani

15 March 2016 Round 23	MC El Eulma	0–0	JSM Skikda	El Eulma
15:00		Report		Stadium: Stade Messaoud Zougar

18 March 2016 Round 24	JSM Béjaïa	0–0	MC El Eulma	Béjaïa
15:00		Report		Stadium: Stade de l'Unité Maghrébine

1 April 2016 Round 25	MC El Eulma	1–0	Paradou AC	El Eulma
16:00	[[]]	Report		Stadium: Stade Messaoud Zougar

8 April 2016 Round 26	A Bou Saâda	1–0	MC El Eulma	Bou Saâda
16:00	[[]]	Report		Stadium: Stade Mokhtar Abdelatif

15 April 2016 Round 27	MC El Eulma	1–0	CRB Aïn Fakroun	El Eulma
16:00	[[]]	Report		Stadium: Stade Messaoud Zougar

22 April 2016 Round 28	MC El Eulma	4–1	USMM Hadjout	El Eulma
16:00	Noubli 40' (pen.), 42', 52'; Aouafi 54'	Report	Bendif 74'	Stadium: Stade Messaoud Zougar; Referee: Haoues, Manceri, Touati

29 April 2016 Round 29	OM Arzew	4–2	MC El Eulma	Arzew
16:00	[[]]; [[]]; [[]]	Report	[[]]; [[]]	Stadium: Stade Menaouer Kerbouci

6 May 2016 Round 30	MC El Eulma	1–0	Olympique de Médéa	El Eulma
16:00	[[]]	Report		Stadium: Stade Messaoud Zougar

== Algerian Cup ==
18 December 2015 Round of 64	MC El Eulma	1–0 (a.e.t.)	CS Constantine	El Eulma
16:00	Madani 116'	Report		Stadium: Stade Messaoud Zougar; Referee: Mial, Salaouadji et Bourouba

8 January 2016 Round of 32	MC El Eulma	1–1 (a.e.t.) (2–4 p)	CRB Aïn Fakroun	El Eulma
16:00	Noubli 42'	Report	45' Boukhari	Stadium: Stade Messaoud Zougar; Referee: Halalchi, Bounoua, Doulache

== Champions League ==
=== Group stage ===
==== Group B ====
Pos	Team	Pld	W	D	L	GF	GA	GD	Pts	Qualification	USM	MER	ESS	MCE
1	(Algeria) USM Alger	6	5	0	1	9	3	+6	15	Advance to knockout stage	—	1–0	3–0	2–1
2	(Sudan) Al-Merrikh	6	4	1	1	9	4	+5	13	Advance to knockout stage	1–0	—	2–0	2–0
3	(Algeria) ES Sétif	6	1	2	3	5	10	−5	5		1–2	1–1	—	2–2
4	(Algeria) MC El Eulma	6	0	1	5	5	11	−6	1		0–1	2–3	0–1	—

Source: CAF
Rules for classification: Group stage tiebreakers

26 June 2015 Matchday 1	Al-Merrikh (Sudan)	2–0	(Algeria) MC El Eulma	Omdurman, Sudan
22:00 UTC+3	Al-Madina 6', 56'	Live TV: beIN Sports		Stadium: Al-Merrikh Stadium; Referee: Janny Sikazwe (Zambia)

11 July 2015 Matchday 2	MC El Eulma (Algeria)	0–1	(Algeria) ES Sétif	El Eulma, Algeria
22:30 UTC+1		Live TV: EN TV / beIN Sports	Mahsas 90' (o.g.)	Stadium: Stade Messaoud Zougar; Referee: Gehad Grisha (Egypt)

24 July 2015 Matchday 3	USM Alger (Algeria)	2–1	(Algeria) MC El Eulma	Algiers, Algeria
20:30 UTC+1	Beldjilali 16'; Seguer 22'; Khoualed (yellow card) 35'; El Orfi (yellow card) 86'	Live TV: EN TV / beIN Sports	(yellow card) 13' Hammami; 40' Korichi; (yellow card) 80' Maïza	Stadium: Stade Omar Hamadi; Referee: Bernard Camille (Seychelles)

7 August 2015 Matchday 4	MC El Eulma (Algeria)	0–1	(Algeria) USM Alger	El Eulma, Algeria
21:15 UTC+1	Bouzama (yellow card) 49'; Belkhiter (yellow card) 57'; Bentayeb (yellow card) 65'	Live TV: EN TV / beIN Sports	(yellow card) 29' Benkhemassa; 49' (yellow card) 79' Meftah; (yellow card) 69' El Orfi	Stadium: Stade Messaoud Zougar; Referee: Eric Otogo-Castane (Gabon)

22 August 2015 Matchday 5	MC El Eulma (Algeria)	2–3	(Sudan) Al-Merrikh	El Eulma, Algeria
20:30 UTC+1	Kadri 15'; Abbès 25'	Live TV: EN TV / beIN Sports	Kamal 67'; Al-Madina 71', 90' (pen.)	Stadium: Stade Messaoud Zougar; Referee: Néant Alioum (Cameroon)

11 September 2015 Matchday 6	ES Sétif (Algeria)	2–2	(Algeria) MC El Eulma	Sétif, Algeria
20:30 UTC+1	Belameiri 61'; Dagoulou 78'	Live TV: EN TV / beIN Sports	Korichi 11'; Abbès 89'	Stadium: Stade 8 Mai 1945; Referee: Joshua Bondo (Botswana)

== Squad information ==
=== Playing statistics ===
No.	Pos	Nat	Player	Total		Ligue 2		Algerian Cup		Champions League	
No.	Pos	Nat	Player	Apps	Goals	Apps	Goals	Apps	Goals	Apps	Goals
Goalkeepers
	GK	(Algeria) ALG	Oussama Methazem	9	0	9	0	0	0	0	0
	GK	(Algeria) ALG	Mohamed Seddik Mokrani	25	0	21	0	1	0	3	0
	GK	(Algeria) ALG	Hichem Ayachi	2	0	1	0	1	0	0	0
Defenders
	DF	(Algeria) ALG	Adel Maïza	20	0	15	0	2	0	3	0
	DF	(Algeria) ALG	Tarek Zeghidi	28	0	25	0	2	0	1	0
	DF	(Algeria) ALG	Mohamed Amine Madani	34	1	29	0	2	1	3	0
	DF	(Algeria) ALG	Mokhtar Belkhiter	27	1	20	1	2	0	5	0
	DF	(Algeria) ALG	Akram Rachi	9	0	9	0	0	0	0	0
	DF	(Algeria) ALG	Ayoub Ghezala	2	0	2	0	0	0	0	0
	DF	(Algeria) ALG	Nassim Oussalah	30	0	27	0	1	0	2	0
	DF	(Algeria) ALG	Mohamed Belhadi	11	0	7	0	1	0	3	0
Midfielders
	MF	(Algeria) ALG	Nacer Hammami	32	0	26	0	2	0	4	0
	MF	(Algeria) ALG	Abdelhak Fercha	2	0	2	0	0	0	0	0
	MF	(Algeria) ALG	Amine Laid Fezzani	13	0	13	0	0	0	0	0
	MF	(Algeria) ALG	Aymen Madi	11	0	10	0	1	0	0	0
	MF	(Algeria) ALG	Ibrahim Si Ammar	30	2	24	2	2	0	4	0
	MF	(Algeria) ALG	Abdelmalek Abbes	14	4	9	2	0	0	5	2
	MF	(Algeria) ALG	Mohamed Abdelaziz Tchikou	23	3	21	3	2	0	0	0
	MF	(Algeria) ALG	Younes Kadri	30	1	26	0	2	0	2	1
Forwards
	FW	(Algeria) ALG	Nadhir Korichi	22	4	18	2	0	0	4	2
	FW	(Algeria) ALG	Fethi Noubli	16	10	15	9	1	1	0	0
	FW	(Algeria) ALG	Youcef Laouafi	31	3	24	3	2	0	5	0
	FW	(Algeria) ALG	Imad Brahmia	27	5	22	5	2	0	3	0
Players transferred out during the season
	DF	(Algeria) ALG	Adel Namane	10	1	7	1	0	0	3	0
	DF	(Algeria) ALG	Khaled Bouzama	7	0	5	0	0	0	2	0
	MF	(Algeria) ALG	Nassim Dehouche	15	0	9	0	1	0	5	0
	MF	(Algeria) ALG	Ismail Benettayeb	16	0	11	0	1	0	4	0
	MF	(Algeria) ALG	Alaeddine Labiod	1	0	1	0	0	0	0	0
	FW	(Algeria) ALG	Farès Hamiti	6	0	4	0	0	0	2	0

Last updated: 19 November 2017

=== Goalscorers ===
Includes all competitive matches. The list is sorted alphabetically by surname when total goals are equal.

No.	Nat.	Player	Pos.	L 2	AC	CL 1	TOTAL
	(Algeria)	Fethi Noubli	FW	9	1	0	10
	(Algeria)	Imad Brahmia	FW	5	0	0	5
	(Algeria)	Nadhir Korichi	FW	2	0	2	4
	(Algeria)	Abdelmalek Abbes	MF	2	0	2	4
	(Algeria)	Mohamed Abdelaziz Tchikou	MF	3	0	0	3
	(Algeria)	Youcef Laouafi	FW	3	0	0	3
	(Algeria)	Ibrahim Si Ammar	MF	2	0	0	2
	(Algeria)	Mohamed Amine Madani	DF	0	1	0	1
	(Algeria)	Mokhtar Belkhiter	DF	1	0	0	1
	(Algeria)	Younes Kadri	MF	0	0	1	1
	(Algeria)	Adel Namane	FW	1	0	0	1
Own Goals				0	0	0	0
Totals				28	2	5	35

== Transfers ==
=== In ===
Date	Pos	Player	From club	Transfer fee	Source
1 January 2016	MF	(Algeria) Amine Laid Fezzani	CA Batna	Undisclosed	
1 January 2016	MF	(Algeria) Aymen Madi	NA Hussein Dey	Undisclosed	

=== Out ===
Date	Pos	Player	To club	Transfer fee	Source
1 January 2016	DF	(Algeria) Adel Namane	ASM Oran	Undisclosed	
1 January 2016	DF	(Algeria) Khaled Bouzama	USMM Hadjout	Undisclosed	
1 January 2016	MF	(Algeria) Ismail Benettayeb	MO Béjaïa	Undisclosed	
1 January 2016	MF	(Algeria) Alaeddine Labiod	MO Constantine	Undisclosed	
7 January 2016	FW	(Algeria) Farès Hamiti	(Morocco) MC Oujda	Undisclosed	
11 January 2016	MF	(Algeria) Nassim Dehouche	JSM Béjaïa	Undisclosed	
