= 2012–13 MC El Eulma season =

MC El Eulma
2012–13 season
- Chairman: Arras Herrada
- Head coach: Abdelkader Yaïche (from 30 June 2012) (until 29 October 2012); Rachid Belhout (from 6 November 2012) (until 24 February 2013); Raoul Savoy (from 28 February 2013)
- Stadium: Stade Messaoud Zougar
- Ligue 1: 8th
- Algerian Cup: Round of 32
- Top goalscorer: League: Ibrahim Chenihi (6); Messaoud Gharbi (6); All: Ibrahim Chenihi (7); Messaoud Gharbi (7)

In the 2012–13 season, MC El Eulma is competing in the Ligue 1 for the 5th season, as well as the Algerian Cup. It is their 5th consecutive season in the top flight of Algerian football. They will be competing in Ligue 1, and the Algerian Cup.

== Squad list ==
Players and squad numbers last updated on 18 November 2012.
Note: Flags indicate national team as has been defined under FIFA eligibility rules. Players may hold more than one non-FIFA nationality.

No.	Nat.	Position	Name	Date of Birth (Age)	Signed from
Goalkeepers
Defenders
Midfielders
Forwards

== Competitions ==
=== Overview ===
Competition	Record								Started round	Final position / round	First match	Last match
Competition	G	W	D	L	GF	GA	GD	Win %	Started round	Final position / round	First match	Last match
Ligue 1	30	9	13	8	29	27	+2	30.00	—N/a	8th	15 September 2012	21 May 2013
Algerian Cup	2	1	0	1	4	4	+0	50.00	Round of 64	Round of 32	14 December 2012	29 December 2012
Total	32	10	13	9	33	31	+2	31.25				

Updated to match played 9 May 2017
Source: Competitions

== League table ==
Pos	Team	Pld	W	D	L	GF	GA	GD	Pts
6	CR Belouizdad	30	11	11	8	32	26	+6	44
7	JS Kabylie	30	11	8	11	32	31	+1	41
8	MC El Eulma	30	9	13	8	29	27	+2	40
9	JS Saoura	30	10	8	12	28	26	+2	38
10	ASO Chlef	30	10	8	12	26	29	−3	38

Updated to match(es) played on 21 May 2013. Source: DZFoot
Rules for classification: 1) points; 2) head-to-head points; 3) head-to-head goal difference; 4) goal difference; 5) total goals; 6) fairplay ranking; 7) playoff.

=== Results summary ===
Overall								Home						Away					
Pld	W	D	L	GF	GA	GD	Pts	W	D	L	GF	GA	GD	W	D	L	GF	GA	GD
30	9	13	8	29	27	+2	40	8	6	1	21	8	+13	1	7	7	8	19	−11

Last updated: 29 December 2014.
Source: Competitive matches

=== Results by round ===
Round	1	2	3	4	5	6	7	8	9	10	11	12	13	14	15	16	17	18	19	20	21	22	23	24	25	26	27	28	29	30
Ground	H	H	A	H	A	H	A	H	A	H	A	H	A	H	A	A	A	H	A	H	A	H	A	H	A	H	A	H	A	H
Result	D	W	L	W	L	D	D	W	D	W	D	W	D	L	D	L	L	D	L	W	D	D	L	D	W	D	L	W	D	W
Position	6	7	7	5	10	8	9	5	6	6	6	5	5	6	6	7	9	8	10	8	8	8	10	10	10	10	11	9	9	8

Source: Competitive matches
A = Away; H = Home; W = Win; D = Draw; L = Loss

=== Matches ===
15 September 2012 Round 1	MC El Eulma	1–1	ES Sétif	El Eulma
17:45	Gharbi 90+4'	Report	47' Delhoum	Stadium: Stade Messaoud Zougar; Referee: Farouk Mial

18 September 2012 Round 2	MC El Eulma	3–2	USM Alger	El Eulma
18:00	Chenihi 52'; Tiaïba 60' (pen.); Abbès 85'	Report	18', 58' Benmoussa	Stadium: Stade Messaoud Zougar; Referee: Mohamed Ghorbal

22 September 2012 Round 3	CA Batna	2–1	MC El Eulma	Batna
18:00	Boulaïnceur 32'; Bensaci 68'	Report	58' (pen.) Tiaïba	Stadium: November 1, 1954 Stadium; Referee: Redouane Necib

29 September 2012 Round 4	MC El Eulma	2–0	USM El Harrach	El Eulma
18:00	Gharbi 6'; Chenihi 8'	Report		Stadium: Stade Messaoud Zougar; Referee: Mohamed Sahraoui

6 October 2012 Round 5	WA Tlemcen	1–0	MC El Eulma	Tlemcen
18:00	Zouak 70'	Report		Stadium: Stade Akid Lotfi; Referee: Merzak Halalchi

16 October 2012 Round 6	MC El Eulma	1–1	JS Saoura	El Eulma
18:00	Tiaïba 1' (pen.)	Report	46' Amri	Stadium: Stade Messaoud Zougar; Referee: Mohamed Benouza

20 October 2012 Round 7	JSM Béjaïa	1–1	MC El Eulma	Béjaïa
18:00	Mebarki 38'	Report	9' Gharbi	Stadium: Stade de l'Unité Maghrébine; Referee: Mohamed Bachir

23 October 2012 Round 8	MC El Eulma	3–0	MC Oran	El Eulma
17:45	Gharbi 26'; Abbes 74'; Tiaïba 78'	Report		Stadium: Stade Messaoud Zougar; Referee: Redouane Necib

3 November 2012 Round 9	CR Belouizdad	1–1	MC El Eulma	Belouizdad
18:00	Hamiti 42'	Report	71' Akkouche	Stadium: Stade 20 Août 1955; Referee: Mohamed Saïdi

10 November 2012 Round 10	MC El Eulma	2–0	USM Bel-Abbès	El Eulma
18:00	Derrardja 59'; Chenihi 84'	Report		Stadium: Stade Messaoud Zougar; Referee: Farouk Mial

17 November 2012 Round 11	MC Alger	0–0	MC El Eulma	Algiers
18:00		Report		Stadium: Stade Omar Hamadi; Referee: Djamel Haimoudi

24 November 2012 Round 12	MC El Eulma	1–0	CS Constantine	El Eulma
18:00	Gharbi 89'	Report		Stadium: Stade Messaoud Zougar; Referee: Mokhtar Amalou

1 December 2012 Round 13	ASO Chlef	0–0	MC El Eulma	Chlef
15:00		Report		Stadium: Stade Mohamed Boumezrag; Referee: Youssef Zerrouki

8 December 2012 Round 14	MC El Eulma	0–1	JS Kabylie	El Eulma
18:00		Report	78' Bencherifa	Stadium: Stade Messaoud Zougar; Referee: Mohamed Ghorbal

22 December 2012 Round 15	CA Bordj Bou Arréridj	0–0	MC El Eulma	Bordj Bou Arréridj
18:00		Report		Stadium: Stade 20 Août 1955; Referee: Farouk Mial

15 January 2013 Round 16	ES Sétif	3–1	MC El Eulma	Sétif
18:00	Delhoum 33'; Nadji 52', 60'	Report	38' Derrardja	Stadium: Stade 8 Mai 1945; Referee: Mokhtar Amalou

19 January 2013 Round 17	USM Alger	1–0	MC El Eulma	Algiers
18:00	Meftah 59'	Report		Stadium: Stade Omar Hamadi; Referee: Sofiane Bousseter

19 February 2013 Round 18	MC El Eulma	0–0	CA Batna	El Eulma
15:00		Report		Stadium: Stade Messaoud Zougar; Referee: Merzak Halalchi

2 February 2013 Round 19	USM El Harrach	1–0	MC El Eulma	Algiers
15:00	Azzi 88'	Report		Stadium: Stade 1er Novembre 1954; Referee: Said Aouina

5 March 2013 Round 20	MC El Eulma	2–1	WA Tlemcen	El Eulma
18:00	Gharbi 14'; Coulibaly 16'	Report	73' Sameur	Stadium: Stade Messaoud Zougar; Referee: Amine Sekhraoui

16 February 2013 Round 21	JS Saoura	1–1	MC El Eulma	Béchar
15:00	Bouguelmouna 2'	Report	87' Derrardja	Stadium: Stade 20 Août 1955; Referee: Ali Nader

23 February 2013 Round 22	MC El Eulma	0–0	JSM Béjaïa	El Eulma
18:00		Report		Stadium: Stade Messaoud Zougar; Referee: Abderrezzak Arab

9 March 2013 Round 23	MC Oran	4–1	MC El Eulma	Oran
15:00	Berradja 23' Boumechra 47'; Benyettou 61'; Aouedj 70'	Report	20' Chenihi	Stadium: Stade Habib Bouakeul; Referee: Sofiane Bousseter

19 March 2013 Round 24	MC El Eulma	1–1	CR Belouizdad	El Eulma
18:00	Coulibaly 26'	Report	45+1' Slimani	Stadium: Stade Messaoud Zougar; Referee: Mohamed Bachir

6 April 2013 Round 25	USM Bel-Abbès	0–1	MC El Eulma	Sidi Bel Abbès
16:00		Report	75' Chenihi	Stadium: Stade 24 Fevrier 1956; Referee: Merzak Halalchi

20 April 2013 Round 26	MC El Eulma	0–0	MC Alger	El Eulma
16:00		Report		Stadium: Stade Messaoud Zougar; Referee: Mohamed Benouza

4 May 2013 Round 27	CS Constantine	3–0	MC El Eulma	Constantine
17:00	Boulahia 52'; Nait Yahia 62'; Tiaiba 67'	Report		Stadium: Stade Mohamed Hamlaoui; Referee: Merzak Halalchi

11 May 2013 Round 28	MC El Eulma	2–0	ASO Chlef	El Eulma
18:00	Hamiti 20'; Abbès 65'	Report		Stadium: Stade Messaoud Zougar; Referee: Mohamed Saïdi

18 May 2013 Round 29	JS Kabylie	1–1	MC El Eulma	Tizi Ouzou
17:00	Messadia 81'	Report	4' Benettayeb	Stadium: Stade 1er Novembre 1954; Referee: Mohamed Sahraoui

21 May 2013 Round 30	MC El Eulma	3–1	CA Bordj Bou Arréridj	El Eulma
17:00	Hamiti 18'; Derrardja 42'; Chenihi 53'	Report	86' (pen.) Mosrati	Stadium: Stade Messaoud Zougar; Referee: Said Aouina

== Algerian Cup ==
14 December 2012 Round of 64	MC El Eulma	2–0	GC Mascara	El Eulma
15:00	Diarra 40'; Gharbi 78'	Report		Stadium: Stade Messaoud Zougar; Referee: Menguelati

29 December 2012 Round of 32	USM El Harrach	4–2 (a.e.t.)	MC El Eulma	Algiers
14:00	Bounedjah 2'; Amada 23' (pen.); El Amali 95'; Tatem 118'	Report	6' Chenihi; 90+5' Kadri	Stadium: Stade 1er Novembre 1954; Referee: Mohamed Bichari

== Squad information ==
=== Playing statistics ===
No.	Pos	Nat	Player	Total		Ligue 1		Algerian Cup	
No.	Pos	Nat	Player	Apps	Goals	Apps	Goals	Apps	Goals
Goalkeepers
22	GK	(Algeria) ALG	Mourad Berrefane	29	0	29	0	0	0
16	GK	(Algeria) ALG	Antara Khattala	1	0	1	0	0	0
Defenders
8	DF	(Algeria) ALG	Ishaq Benameur	1	0	1	0	0	0
4	DF	(Algeria) ALG	Koceila Berchiche	28	0	28	0	0	0
14	DF	(Algeria) ALG	Nassim Oussalah	28	0	28	0	0	0
15	DF	(Algeria) ALG	Abdeslam Mebarakou	8	0	8	0	0	0
	DF	(Algeria) ALG	Khaled Bouzama	2	0	2	0	0	0
21	DF	(Algeria) ALG	Tarek Zeghidi	25	0	25	0	0	0
5	DF	(Algeria) ALG	Adel Namane	21	0	21	0	0	0
	DF	(Algeria) ALG	Zenghab	1	0	1	0	0	0
6	DF	(Algeria) ALG	Sofiane Boutebba	2	0	2	0	0	0
	DF	(Algeria) ALG	Abdelraouf Baâziz	1	0	1	0	0	0
Midfielders
29	MF	(Algeria) ALG	Abdelkader Harizi	13	0	13	0	0	0
	MF	(Algeria) ALG	Nassim Dehouche	12	0	12	0	0	0
	MF	(Algeria) ALG	Kamel Marek	2	0	2	0	0	0
23	MF	(Algeria) ALG	Adam Bouzid	10	0	10	0	0	0
18	MF	(Algeria) ALG	Messaoud Gharbei	29	6	29	6	0	0
20	MF	(Algeria) ALG	Slimane Illoul	2	0	2	0	0	0
7	MF	(Algeria) ALG	Ismail Bentayeb	15	1	15	1	0	0
10	MF	(Algeria) ALG	Nacer Hammami	22	0	22	0	0	0
24	MF	(Algeria) ALG	Ibrahim Chenihi	28	6	28	6	0	0
6	MF	(Mali) MLI	Yahya Coulibaly	10	0	10	0	0	0
Forwards
9	FW	(Algeria) ALG	Mohamed Tiaiba	15	4	15	4	0	0
17	FW	(Algeria) ALG	Walid Derrardja	25	4	25	4	0	0
87	FW	(Algeria) ALG	Farès Hamiti	15	2	15	2	0	0
	FW	(Algeria) ALG	Ramzi Bourakba	9	0	9	0	0	0
19	FW	(Algeria) ALG	Yassine Akkouche	15	1	15	1	0	0
25	FW	(Burkina Faso) BFA	Diarra Ladji Abdramane	5	0	5	0	0	0
2	FW	(Algeria) ALG	Younès Kadri	18	0	18	0	0	0
	FW	(Cameroon) CMR	Mark Pangwoh	6	0	6	0	0	0
	FW	(Algeria) ALG	Mohamed Larbi Khoualed	2	0	2	0	0	0
31	FW	(Algeria) ALG	Abdelmalek Abbes	15	3	15	3	0	0
Players transferred out during the season

Last updated: 30 November 2017
Source: fr.soccerway.com

== Transfers ==
=== In ===
Date	Pos	Player	From club	Transfer fee	Source
1 July 2012	DF	(Algeria) Khaled Bouzama	RC Kouba	Undisclosed	
1 July 2012	DF	(Algeria) Abdeslam Mebarakou	MC Saïda	Undisclosed	
1 July 2012	DF	(Algeria) Tarek Zeghidi	MSP Batna	Undisclosed	
1 July 2012	DF	(Algeria) Sofiane Boutebba	US Chaouia	Undisclosed	
1 July 2012	DF	(Algeria) Nassim Oussalah	CA Batna	Undisclosed	
1 July 2012	MF	(Algeria) Nassim Dehouche	MO Béjaïa	Undisclosed	
1 July 2012	MF	(Algeria) Slimane Illoul	RC Kouba	Undisclosed	
1 July 2012	FW	(Algeria) Walid Derrardja	NA Hussein Dey	Undisclosed	
1 July 2012	FW	(Algeria) Yassine Akkouche	CA Bordj Bou Arréridj	Undisclosed	
1 August 2012	MF	(Algeria) Abdelkader Harizi	MC Oran	Free transfer	
1 January 2013	FW	(Algeria) Ramzi Bourakba	JSM Béjaïa	Undisclosed	
1 January 2013	FW	(Cameroon) Mark Pangwoh	(Tunisia) AS Gabès	Undisclosed	
6 January 2013	FW	(Algeria) Farès Hamiti	CR Belouizdad	Undisclosed	
12 January 2013	MF	(Mali) Yahya Coulibaly	(Mali) Stade Malien	Undisclosed	

=== Out ===
Date	Pos	Player	To club	Transfer fee	Source
1 July 2012	FW	(Algeria) Djamel Bouaïcha	JS Kabylie	Free transfer	
1 July 2012	DF	(Algeria) Faycal Belakhdar	JS Kabylie	Undisclosed	
6 January 2013	FW	(Algeria) Mohamed Tiaiba	CS Constantine	Undisclosed	
