= 2013–14 MO Béjaïa season =

MO Béjaïa
2013–14 season
- Chairman: Akli Adrar
- Head coach: Mourad Rahmouni (until 21 September 2013); Fawzi Moussouni (interim) (from 22 September 2013) (until 26 September 2013); Abdelkader Amrani (from 26 September 2013)
- Stadium: Stade de l'Unité Maghrébine
- Ligue 1: 11th
- Algerian Cup: Round of 32
- Top goalscorer: League: Faouzi Rahal (8); All: Faouzi Rahal (8); Nassim Yettou (8)

In the 2013–14 season, MO Béjaïa is competing in the Ligue 1 for the 1st season, as well as the Algerian Cup. They will be competing in Ligue 1, and the Algerian Cup.

== Competitions ==
=== Overview ===
| Competition | Record | | | | | | | | Started round | Final position / round | First match | Last match |
| Competition | G | W | D | L | GF | GA | GD | Win % | Started round | Final position / round | First match | Last match |
|---|---|---|---|---|---|---|---|---|---|---|---|---|
| Ligue 1 | 30 | 10 | 6 | 14 | 29 | 35 | −6 | 33.33 | —N/a | 11th | 24 August 2013 | 22 May 2014 |
| Algerian Cup | 2 | 1 | 0 | 1 | 1 | 2 | −1 | 50.00 | Round of 64 | Round of 32 | 7 December 2013 | 21 December 2013 |
| Total | 32 | 11 | 6 | 15 | 30 | 37 | −7 | 34.38 | | | | |

Updated to match played 9 May 2017
Source: Competitions

== League table ==
| Pos | Team | Pld | W | D | L | GF | GA | GD | Pts |
|---|---|---|---|---|---|---|---|---|---|
| 9 | JS Saoura | 30 | 12 | 7 | 11 | 38 | 36 | +2 | 43 |
| 10 | CS Constantine | 30 | 10 | 11 | 9 | 30 | 31 | −1 | 41 |
| 11 | MO Béjaïa | 30 | 10 | 6 | 14 | 29 | 35 | −6 | 36 |
| 12 | MC Oran | 30 | 9 | 8 | 13 | 33 | 40 | −7 | 35 |
| 13 | CR Belouizdad | 30 | 9 | 5 | 16 | 26 | 33 | −7 | 32 |

Updated to match(es) played on 22 May 2014. Source: DZFoot
Rules for classification: 1) points; 2) head-to-head points; 3) head-to-head goal difference; 4) goal difference; 5) total goals; 6) fairplay ranking; 7) playoff.

=== Results summary ===
| Overall | | | | | | | | Home | | | | | | Away | | | | | |
| Pld | W | D | L | GF | GA | GD | Pts | W | D | L | GF | GA | GD | W | D | L | GF | GA | GD |
|---|---|---|---|---|---|---|---|---|---|---|---|---|---|---|---|---|---|---|---|
| 30 | 10 | 6 | 14 | 29 | 33 | −4 | 36 | 9 | 3 | 3 | 18 | 7 | +11 | 1 | 3 | 11 | 11 | 26 | −15 |

Last updated: 29 December 2014.
Source: Competitive matches

=== Results by round ===
| Round | 1 | 2 | 3 | 4 | 5 | 6 | 7 | 8 | 9 | 10 | 11 | 12 | 13 | 14 | 15 | 16 | 17 | 18 | 19 | 20 | 21 | 22 | 23 | 24 | 25 | 26 | 27 | 28 | 29 | 30 |
|---|---|---|---|---|---|---|---|---|---|---|---|---|---|---|---|---|---|---|---|---|---|---|---|---|---|---|---|---|---|---|
| Ground | A | H | A | H | A | H | A | H | A | H | A | H | A | H | A | H | A | H | A | H | A | H | A | H | A | H | A | H | A | H |
| Result | L | D | L | L | L | W | L | W | D | W | L | W | D | W | L | L | L | W | L | W | L | W | L | L | L | D | D | D | W | W |
| Position | | | | | | | | | | | | | | | | | | | | | | | | | | | | | | 11 |

Updated to match(es) played on 29 December 2014. Source: Competitive matches
A = Away; H = Home; W = Win; D = Draw; L = Loss

=== Matches ===
| 24 August 2013 Round 1 | USM Alger | 4–1 | MO Béjaïa | Algiers |
| 18:00 | Djediat 10'; Andria 68', 72'; Ziaya 88' (pen.) | Report | 85' D. Akrour | Stadium: Stade Omar Hamadi; Referee: Mohamed Benouza |

| 31 August 2013 Round 2 | MO Béjaïa | 1–1 | JS Saoura | Béjaïa |
| 18:00 | Z. Nemdil 85' (pen.) | Report | 5' Hamzaoui | Stadium: Stade de l'Unité Maghrébine; Referee: Abderrezzak Arab |

| 3 September 2013 Round 3 | CS Constantine | 2–1 | MO Béjaïa | Constantine |
| 00:00 | Boucherit 63' (pen.); Boulemdaïs 77' | Report | 55' S. Chebana | Stadium: Stade Mohamed Hamlaoui; Referee: Said Aouina |

| 14 September 2013 Round 4 | MO Béjaïa | 1–2 | MC El Eulma | Béjaïa |
| 18:00 | Semani 72' | Report | 62' Chenihi; 86' Hamiti | Stadium: Stade de l'Unité Maghrébine; Referee: Djamel Haimoudi |

| 21 September 2013 Round 5 | RC Arbaâ | 1–0 | MO Béjaïa | Blida |
| 16:00 | Cheurfaoui 47' | Report | | Stadium: Stade Frères Brakni; Referee: Mokhtar Amalou |

| 27 September 2013 Round 6 | MO Béjaïa | 1–0 | CRB Aïn Fakroun | Béjaïa |
| 16:45 | Semani 73' | Report | | Stadium: Stade de l'Unité Maghrébine; Referee: Farouk Houasnia |

| 5 October 2013 Round 7 | MC Oran | 2–0 | MO Béjaïa | Oran |
| 18:00 | Nessakh 38'; Benyettou 84' | Report | | Stadium: Ahmed Zabana Stadium; Referee: Rafik Achouri |

| 19 October 2013 Round 8 | MO Béjaïa | 1–0 | CR Belouizdad | Béjaïa |
| 18:00 | F. Rahal 78' | Report | | Stadium: Stade de l'Unité Maghrébine; Referee: Mehdi Abid Charef |

| 25 October 2013 Round 9 | JSM Béjaïa | 0–0 | MO Béjaïa | Béjaïa |
| 16:45 | | Report | | Stadium: Stade de l'Unité Maghrébine; Referee: Mohamed Benouza |

| 2 November 2013 Round 10 | MO Béjaïa | 2–0 | ES Sétif | Béjaïa |
| 17:00 | Yaya 32'; W. Semani 66' | Report | | Stadium: Stade de l'Unité Maghrébine; Referee: Mohamed Bichari |

| 9 November 2013 Round 11 | ASO Chlef | 2–0 | MO Béjaïa | Chlef |
| 18:00 | Daham 50'; Boussaid 85' | Report | | Stadium: Stade Mohamed Boumezrag; Referee: Abderrezzak Arab |

| 23 November 2013 Round 12 | MO Béjaïa | 1–0 | MC Alger | Béjaïa |
| 18:00 | F. Rahal 84' | Report | | Stadium: Stade de l'Unité Maghrébine; Referee: Rafik Achouri |

| 30 November 2013 Round 13 | JS Kabylie | 0–0 | MO Béjaïa | Tizi Ouzou |
| 15:00 | | Report | | Stadium: Stade du 1er Novembre 1954; Referee: Merzak Halalchi |

| 14 December 2013 Round 14 | MO Béjaïa | 3–0 | CA Bordj Bou Arréridj | Béjaïa |
| 18:00 | Yattou 12', 38'; Bouamria 27' | Report | | Stadium: Stade de l'Unité Maghrébine; Referee: Mohamed Saïdi |

| 28 December 2013 Round 15 | USM El Harrach | 2–0 | MO Béjaïa | Algiers |
| 15:00 | Belkaroui 41'; Abid 71' | Report | | Stadium: Stade 1er Novembre 1954; Referee: Abderrezzak Arab |

| 18 January 2014 Round 16 | MO Béjaïa | 0–3 | USM Alger | Béjaïa |
| 17:45 | | Report | 7' Chafaï | Stadium: Stade de l'Unité Maghrébine; Referee: Redouane Necib |

| 1 February 2014 Round 17 | JS Saoura | 2–1 | MO Béjaïa | Béchar |
| 15:00 | Beldjilali 15' (pen.), 62' | Report | 40' F. Rahal | Stadium: Stade 20 Août 1955; Referee: Said Aouina |

| 8 February 2014 Round 18 | MO Béjaïa | 2–0 | CS Constantine | Béjaïa |
| 17:45 | Yettou 33', 38' | Report | | Stadium: Stade de l'Unité Maghrébine; Referee: Mohamed Bichari |

| 15 February 2014 Round 19 | MC El Eulma | 2–0 | MO Béjaïa | El Eulma |
| 15:00 | Hamiti 7' (pen.); Derrardja 82' | Report | | Stadium: Stade Messaoud Zougar; Referee: Mohamed Benouza |

| 22 February 2014 Round 20 | MO Béjaïa | 2–0 | RC Arbaâ | Béjaïa |
| 18:00 | Dehouche 76'; Yettou 90+1' | Report | | Stadium: Stade de l'Unité Maghrébine; Referee: Djamel Haimoudi |

| 1 March 2014 Round 21 | CRB Aïn Fakroun | 2–1 | MO Béjaïa | Aïn M'lila |
| 15:00 | Daïra 54'; Daoudi 80' | Report | 62' Betrouni | Stadium: Stade des Frères Demane Debbih; Referee: Mohamed Bachir |

| 8 March 2014 Round 22 | MO Béjaïa | 1–0 | MC Oran | Béjaïa |
| 18:00 | A. Bouamria 85' | Report | | Stadium: Stade de l'Unité Maghrébine; Referee: Merzak Halalchi |

| 15 March 2014 Round 23 | CR Belouizdad | 1–0 | MO Béjaïa | Algiers |
| 15:00 | Ahmed Fathi Mohamed 69' | Report | | Stadium: Stade 20 Août 1955; Referee: Mohamed Sahraoui |

| 22 March 2014 Round 24 | MO Béjaïa | 0–1 | JSM Béjaïa | Béjaïa |
| 18:00 | | Report | 77' I. Tatem | Stadium: Stade de l'Unité Maghrébine; Referee: Mokhtar Amalou |

| 26 April 2014 Round 25 | ES Sétif | 3–2 | MO Béjaïa | Sétif |
| 19:00 | Belameiri 53'; Nadji 72', 84' | Report | 43' Y. Nehari; 79' N. YattouYettou | Stadium: Stade 8 Mai 1945; Referee: Mehdi Abid Charef |

| 3 May 2014 Round 26 | MO Béjaïa | 0–0 | ASO Chlef | Béjaïa |
| 18:00 | | Report | | Stadium: Stade de l'Unité Maghrébine; Referee: Amine Sekhraoui |

| 10 May 2014 Round 27 | MC Alger | 2–2 | MO Béjaïa | Algiers |
| 17:00 | Boucherit 26' (pen.); Hachoud 90+2' | Report | 45' (pen.) F. Rahal; 67' D. Akrour | Stadium: Stade Omar Hamadi; Referee: Redouane Necib |

| 13 May 2014 Round 28 | MO Béjaïa | 1–1 | JS Kabylie | Béjaïa |
| 17:00 | Z. Nemdil 90' | Report | 34' Zubya | Stadium: Stade de l'Unité Maghrébine; Referee: Lyés Bekouassa |

| 17 May 2014 Round 29 | CA Bordj Bou Arréridj | 1–3 | MO Béjaïa | Bordj Bou Arréridj |
| 17:00 | Bendrima 47' | Report | 31', 83' Rahal; 37' Akrour | Stadium: Stade 20 Août 1955; Referee: Merzak Halalchi |

| 24 May 2014 Round 30 | MO Béjaïa | 2–1 | USM El Harrach | Béjaïa |
| 17:00 | Yettou 30'; F. Rahal 45+5' (pen.) | Report | 32' B. Mebarki | Stadium: Stade de l'Unité Maghrébine; Referee: Mohamed Saïdi |

=== Algerian Cup ===
| 7 December 2013 Round of 64 | MO Béjaïa | 1–0 | CR Belouizdad | Béjaïa |
| 16:00 | Yettou 17' | Repport | | Stadium: Stade de l'Unité Maghrébine |

| 21 December 2013 Round of 32 | CS Constantine | 2–0 | MO Béjaïa | Constantine |
| 16:00 | Sameur 78'; Boulemdaïs 80' | Repport | | Stadium: Stade Mohamed Hamlaoui; Referee: Sahraoui, Hadj Said, Abid |

== Squad information ==
=== Playing statistics ===
| No. | Pos | Nat | Player | Total | | Ligue 1 | | Algerian Cup | |
| No. | Pos | Nat | Player | Apps | Goals | Apps | Goals | Apps | Goals |
Goalkeepers
| 1 | GK | (Algeria) ALG | Mourad Berrefane | 15 | 0 | 15 | 0 | 0 | 0 |
| 22 | GK | (Algeria) ALG | Mustapha Zaidi | 15 | 0 | 15 | 0 | 0 | 0 |
Defenders
| | DF | (Algeria) ALG | Sid Ahmed Khedis | 4 | 0 | 4 | 0 | 0 | 0 |
| 5 | DF | (Algeria) ALG | Saber Chebana | 21 | 1 | 21 | 1 | 0 | 0 |
| | DF | (Algeria) ALG | Youcef Nehari | 8 | 1 | 8 | 1 | 0 | 0 |
| 19 | DF | (Algeria) ALG | Mounir Guedjali | 22 | 0 | 22 | 0 | 0 | 0 |
| 23 | DF | (Algeria) ALG | Sofiane Baouali | 23 | 0 | 23 | 0 | 0 | 0 |
| 7 | DF | (Algeria) ALG | Hamid Bahri | 12 | 0 | 12 | 0 | 0 | 0 |
| 20 | DF | (Algeria) ALG | Ali Bouamria | 25 | 2 | 25 | 2 | 0 | 0 |
| 90 | DF | (Algeria) ALG | Billel Bendjenine | 3 | 0 | 3 | 0 | 0 | 0 |
| 28 | DF | (Algeria) ALG | Yacine Salhi | 2 | 0 | 2 | 0 | 0 | 0 |
Midfielders
| 99 | MF | (Algeria) ALG | Nassim Dehouche | 26 | 1 | 26 | 1 | 0 | 0 |
| | MF | (Algeria) ALG | Rédha Betrouni | 15 | 1 | 15 | 1 | 0 | 0 |
| | MF | (Algeria) ALG | Fares Brahimi | 6 | 0 | 6 | 0 | 0 | 0 |
| | MF | (Mali) MLI | Soumaila Sidibe | 9 | 0 | 9 | 0 | 0 | 0 |
| | MF | (Algeria) ALG | Nassim Yettou | 28 | 7 | 28 | 7 | 0 | 0 |
| 10 | MF | (Algeria) ALG | Djebar Akrour | 29 | 3 | 29 | 3 | 0 | 0 |
| 6 | MF | (Algeria) ALG | Malek Ferhat | 24 | 0 | 24 | 0 | 0 | 0 |
| 21 | MF | (Algeria) ALG | Zahir Nemdil | 15 | 2 | 15 | 2 | 0 | 0 |
| 18 | MF | (Algeria) ALG | Faouzi Rahal | 24 | 7 | 24 | 7 | 0 | 0 |
| | MF | (Algeria) ALG | Amine Mesbah Bacha | 6 | 0 | 6 | 0 | 0 | 0 |
| 4 | MF | (Algeria) ALG | Abderrahmane Bounachada | 1 | 0 | 1 | 0 | 0 | 0 |
Forwards
| 11 | FW | (Algeria) ALG | Rafik Boulanseur | 22 | 0 | 22 | 0 | 0 | 0 |
| 9 | FW | (Algeria) ALG | Faouzi Yaya | 26 | 1 | 26 | 1 | 0 | 0 |
| 14 | FW | (Algeria) ALG | Walid Semani | 24 | 3 | 24 | 3 | 0 | 0 |
| | FW | (Mali) MLI | Siriman Magassouba | 8 | 0 | 8 | 0 | 0 | 0 |
Players transferred out during the season

Last updated: 16 November 2017
Source: fr.soccerway.com

== Transfers ==
=== In ===
| Date | Pos | Player | From club | Transfer fee | Source |
|---|---|---|---|---|---|
| 1 July 2013 | MF | (Algeria) Reda Betrouni | USM Alger | Loan one year | |
| 1 July 2013 | MF | (Algeria) Nassim Yattou | USM Alger | Loan one year | |
| 1 July 2013 | FW | (Algeria) Rafik Boulanseur | JS Kabylie | Undisclosed | |
| 3 July 2013 | DF | (Algeria) Hamid Bahri | Olympique de Médéa | Undisclosed | |
| 6 July 2013 | GK | (Algeria) Mourad Berrefane | MC El Eulma | Undisclosed | |
| 8 July 2013 | MF | (Algeria) Faycal Mesbah | CRB Aïn Fakroun | Free transfer | |
| 17 July 2013 | MF | (Algeria) Faouzi Yaya | ES Sétif | Free transfer | |
| 1 January 2014 | DF | (Algeria) Yacine Salhi | MB Bouira | Undisclosed | |
| 1 January 2014 | MF | (Mali) Soumaila Sidibe | (Mali) CO de Bamako | Free transfer | |
| 14 January 2014 | DF | (Algeria) Youcef Nehari | USM Bel-Abbès | Free transfer | |
| 14 January 2014 | MF | (Algeria) (France) Fares Brahimi | Unattached | Free transfer | |
| 15 January 2014 | FW | (Mali) Siriman Magassouba | (Mali) AS Real Bamako | Free transfer | |
