= 2015–16 Algerian Ligue Professionnelle 2 =

Algerian Ligue Professionnelle 2
- Season: 2015–16
- Champions: Olympique de Médéa
- Promoted: Olympique de Médéa; CA Batna; USM Bel-Abbès
- Relegated: USMM Hadjout; OM Arzew; US Chaouia
- Matches: 240
- Goals: 447 (1.86 per match)
- Top goalscorer: Mohamed Amine Hamia (14 goals)
- Biggest home win: ASO Chlef 5–1 US Chaouia (29 April 2016)
- Biggest away win: OM Arzew 0–4 USM Bel-Abbès (23 October 2015)

The 2015–16 Algerian Ligue Professionnelle 2 was the 52nd season of the Algerian Ligue Professionnelle 2 since its establishment, and its sixth season under its current title. A total of 16 teams contested the league.

== Team overview ==
=== Stadia and locations ===
Locations of teams in the 2015–16 Algerian Ligue Professionnelle 2

Team	Location	Stadium	Capacity
Amel Bou Saâda	Bou Saâda	Stade Mokhtar Abdelatif	8,000
AS Khroub	El Khroub	Stade Abed Hamdani	10,000
ASO Chlef	Chlef	Stade Mohamed Boumezrag	18,000
CA Batna	Batna	Stade 1er Novembre 1954	20,000
CA Bordj Bou Arréridj	Bordj Bou Arréridj	Stade 20 Août 1955	15,000
CRB Aïn Fakroun	Aïn Fakroun	Stade Allag Abderrahmane	9,000
JSM Béjaïa	Béjaïa	Stade de l'Unité Maghrébine	17,500
JSM Skikda	Skikda	Stade 20 Août 1955	25,000
MC El Eulma	El Eulma	Stade Messaoud Zougar	25,000
MC Saïda	Saïda	Stade 13 Avril 1958	25,000
Olympique de Médéa	Médéa	Stade Imam Lyes	12,000
OM Arzew	Arzew	Stade Menaouer Kerbouci	7,000
Paradou AC	Algiers	Dar El Beïda Stadium	10,000
US Chaouia	Oum El Bouaghi	Stade Hassouna Zerdani	10,000
USM Bel-Abbès	Sidi Bel Abbès	Stade 24 Fevrier 1956	45,000
USMM Hadjout	Hadjout	Stade 5 Juillet 1962	8,000

== League table ==
Pos	Team	Pld	W	D	L	GF	GA	GD	Pts	Qualification or relegation
1	Olympique de Médéa (P)	30	16	6	8	32	22	+10	54	2016–17 Algerian Ligue Professionnelle 1
2	CA Batna (P)	30	13	11	6	27	17	+10	50	2016–17 Algerian Ligue Professionnelle 1
3	USM Bel Abbès (P)	30	12	13	5	27	18	+9	49	2016–17 Algerian Ligue Professionnelle 1
4	Paradou AC	30	11	13	6	39	25	+14	46	
5	MC El Eulma	30	10	10	10	28	25	+3	40	
6	JSM Skikda	30	10	10	10	35	33	+2	40	
7	A Bou Saâda	30	11	7	12	29	31	−2	40	
8	CA Bordj Bou Arreridj	30	9	12	9	30	28	+2	39	
9	CRB Aïn Fakroun	30	10	9	11	22	21	+1	39	
10	AS Khroub	30	10	9	11	34	36	−2	39	
11	MC Saïda	30	10	9	11	29	32	−3	39	
12	ASO Chlef	30	10	8	12	30	31	−1	38	
13	JSM Béjaïa	30	9	11	10	25	29	−4	38	
14	US Chaouia (R)	30	9	10	11	26	29	−3	37	2016–17 Championnat National Amateur
15	OM Arzew (R)	30	10	7	13	28	41	−13	37	2016–17 Championnat National Amateur
16	USMM Hadjout (R)	30	4	7	19	22	45	−23	19	2016–17 Championnat National Amateur

Updated to match(es) played on 6 May 2016. Source: DZFOOT.COM
Rules for classification: 1) points; 2) goal difference; 3) number of goals scored.
(P) Promoted; (R) Relegated

=== Result table ===
Home \ Away	ABS	ASK	ASC	CAB	CABBA	CRBAF	JBE	JSMS	MCEE	MCS	OM	OMA	PAC	USC	USMB	USMMH
A Bou Saâda		0–1	0–0	2–1	1–0	0–1	1–1	1–2	1–0	2–1	0–0	3–1	1–1	0–1	0–1	2–1
AS Khroub	1–1		1–1	2–0	3–1	2–3	0–1	1–0	0–1	2–2	1–0	4–1	2–2	1–1	1–0	0–2
ASO Chlef	0–1	1–0		1–2	0–0	1–0	2–3	2–0	1–0	3–1	0–0	1–0	1–1	5–1	0–0	2–1
CA Batna	1–0	2–0	4–1		0–0	1–0	0–1	2–1	0–0	2–1	2–0	1–0	1–0	0–0	0–0	2–0
CA Bordj Bou Arreridj	1–0	2–3	2–2	0–0		1–0	2–2	2–1	3–1	3–0	0–1	1–1	1–1	1–0	3–1	1–0
CRB Aïn Fakroun	3–0	0–1	0–1	0–1	2–1		0–0	3–2	0–0	2–1	0–0	0–0	0–0	1–0	1–1	1–0
JSM Béjaïa	1–1	1–1	2–1	0–0	2–0	0–0		0–2	0–0	0–1	1–0	1–2	1–2	1–0	0–0	2–1
JSM Skikda	3–1	1–1	3–1	0–1	0–1	1–1	2–0		1–2	2–2	1–0	0–0	2–1	2–1	2–2	2–0
MC El Eulma	1–0	2–2	0–1	1–1	0–0	1–0	3–0	0–0		3–2	1–0	3–2	1–0	1–1	0–1	4–0
MC Saïda	0–1	1–0	1–0	1–0	0–0	1–0	1–1	1–1	1–0		0–0	2–0	2–0	1–2	0–0	1–0
Olympique de Médéa	2–3	3–2	1–0	2–0	1–0	1–0	2–1	2–0	2–1	2–1		0–1	2–1	2–1	2–0	2–1
OM Arzew	3–2	0–0	1–0	2–2	1–0	0–1	1–0	2–0	4–2	1–1	1–2		1–6	0–1	0–4	1–1
Paradou AC	1–1	0–1	1–0	0–0	2–2	1–0	1–1	1–1	0–0	2–0	2–1	1–0		2–1	0–0	4–1
US Chaouia	0–1	2–0	1–1	0–0	2–0	1–1	1–1	0–0	1–0	1–0	0–1	2–0	1–3		1–0	1–1
USM Bel Abbès	1–0	2–1	2–1	1–1	1–1	1–0	1–0	1–0	1–0	2–1	1–1	0–1	0–0	1–0		2–0
USMM Hadjout	1–3	3–0	2–0	0–0	0–2	1–2	1–0	1–2	0–0	0–2	0–0	0–1	1–3	2–2	1–1	

Updated to match(es) played on 20 October 2014. Source: DZFoot
Legend: Blue = home team win; Yellow = draw; Red = away team win.

== Season statistics ==
=== Top scorers ===
Rank	Scorer	Club	Goals
1	(Algeria) Mohamed Amine Hamia	JSM Skikda / Olympique de Médéa	15
2	(Algeria) Sofiane Baouche	OM Arzew	12
3	(Algeria) Yacine Benouadah	Paradou AC	10
3	(Algeria) Riad Benayad	Paradou AC	10
4	(Algeria) Fethi Noubli	MC El Eulma	9
5	(Algeria) Fares Cheniguer	JSM Skikda	8
5	(Algeria) Abdelouahab Djahel	AS Khroub	8
5	(Algeria) Houssem Eddine Rebouh	CA Batna	8
5	(Algeria) Walid Belhamri	AS Khroub	8
6	(Algeria) Billel Attafen	CA Bordj Bou Arréridj	7
6	(Algeria) Ahmed Kara	ASO Chlef	7
6	(Algeria) Fouzi Boulainine	CRB Ain Fakroun / AS Khroub	7
6	(Algeria) Youcef Zerguine	CA Bordj Bou Arréridj	7

== Media coverage ==
Algerian Ligue Professionnelle 1 Media Coverage
Country	Television Channel	Matches
Algeria	EPTV Terrestre	1 Match per round
Algeria	Dzair TV	1 Match per round

== See also ==
- 2015–16 Algerian Ligue Professionnelle 1
- 2015–16 Algerian Cup
