= Karim Benyamina =

Footballer (born 1981)

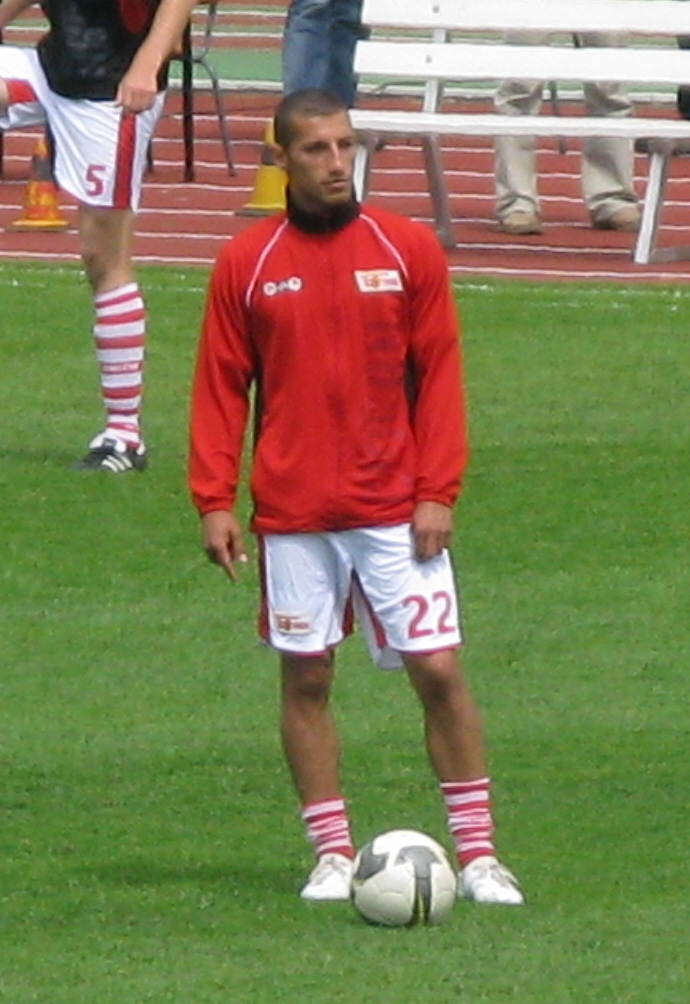
- Benyamina with Union Berlin

Personal information
- Date of birth: 18 December 1981 (age 44)
- Place of birth: Dresden, East Germany
- Height: 1.78 m (5 ft 10 in)
- Position: Striker

Youth career
- 1992–1996: MSV Normannia 08
- 1996–2006: 1. FC Lübars

Senior career*
| Years | Team | Apps | (Gls) |
| 2000–2001 | Berlin AK 07 | 30 | (4) |
| 2001–2004 | Reinickendorfer Füchse | 92 | (34) |
| 2004–2005 | SV Babelsberg 03 | 33 | (18) |
| 2005–2011 | Union Berlin | 190 | (62) |
| 2011–2012 | FSV Frankfurt | 21 | (3) |
| 2012–2014 | Karlsruher SC | 13 | (0) |
| 2014 | MC El Eulma | 6 | (0) |
| 2014–2016 | Berliner AK 07 | 41 | (19) |
| 2016–2017 | FC Viktoria 1889 | 54 | (26) |
| 2018–2019 | Tennis Borussia Berlin | 39 | (19) |
| Total | | 519 | (186) |

International career
| 2010–2011 | Algeria | 2 | (0) |
- * Club domestic league appearances and goals

Karim Benyamina (Arabic: كريم بن يمينة; born 18 December 1981) is a former professional footballer who played as a forward. Born in East Germany, he represented the Algeria national team twice internationally.

== Club career ==
=== Union Berlin ===
On 26 September 2009, Benyamina scored a goal in a league game against Rot Weiss Ahlen becoming the top scorer in the history of Union Berlin with 78 goals in 161 matches in all competitions.

On 7 April 2011, Benyamina announced that he would be leaving Union Berlin at the end of the season, after being at the club for six years. He is the all-time top scorer in the club's history with 87 goals in all competitions, with his number 22 jersey retired until someone breaks his goal scoring record.

=== FSV Frankfurt ===
On 27 May 2011, Benyamina signed a two-year contract with FSV Frankfurt.

== International career ==
On 30 October 2010, Benyamina was called up to the Algeria national team by head coach Abdelhak Benchikha for a friendly against Luxembourg. On 17 November 2010, he made his debut for Algeria as a starter against Luxembourg before being subbed off in the 80th minute. In doing so, he became the first German-born player to play for Algeria.

== Personal life ==
Karim's younger brother Soufian is also a professional footballer, currently playing for Greifswalder FC.

== Career statistics ==
Appearances and goals by club, season and competition
| Club | Season | League | | | DFB-Pokal | | Total | |
| Club | Season | Division | Apps | Goals | Apps | Goals | Apps | Goals |
|---|---|---|---|---|---|---|---|---|
| Reinickendorfer Füchse | 2003–04 | | | | 1 | 0 | | |
| SV Babelsberg 03 | 2004–05 | NOFV-Oberliga Nord | 16 | 12 | 0 | 0 | 16 | 12 |
| Union Berlin | 2005–06 | NOFV-Oberliga Nord | 24 | 10 | 0 | 0 | 24 | 10 |
| Union Berlin | 2006–07 | Regionalliga Nord | 35 | 11 | 0 | 0 | 35 | 11 |
| Union Berlin | 2007–08 | Regionalliga Nord | 35 | 7 | 1 | 0 | 36 | 7 |
| Union Berlin | 2008–09 | 3. Liga | 32 | 16 | 0 | 0 | 32 | 16 |
| Union Berlin | 2009–10 | 2. Bundesliga | 28 | 6 | 1 | 0 | 29 | 6 |
| Union Berlin | 2010–11 | 2. Bundesliga | 30 | 7 | 1 | 0 | 31 | 7 |
| Union Berlin | Total | | 184 | 57 | 3 | 0 | 187 | 57 |
| FSV Frankfurt | 2011–12 | 2. Bundesliga | 21 | 3 | 2 | 2 | 23 | 5 |
| Karlsruher SC | 2012–13 | 3. Liga | 13 | 0 | 0 | 0 | 13 | 0 |
| Karlsruher SC | 2013–14 | 2. Bundesliga | 0 | 0 | 0 | 0 | 0 | 0 |
| Karlsruher SC | Total | | 13 | 0 | 0 | 0 | 13 | 0 |
| MC El Eulma | 2013–14 | Algerian Ligue Professionnelle 1 | 6 | 0 | 0 | 0 | 6 | 0 |
| Berliner AK 07 | 2014–15 | Regionalliga Nordost | 23 | 11 | 0 | 0 | 23 | 11 |
| Berliner AK 07 | 2015–16 | Regionalliga Nordost | 18 | 8 | 0 | 0 | 13 | 8 |
| Berliner AK 07 | Total | | 41 | 19 | 0 | 0 | 41 | 19 |
| Viktoria Berlin | 2015–16 | Regionalliga Nordost | 4 | 4 | 0 | 0 | 4 | 4 |
| Viktoria Berlin | 2016–17 | Regionalliga Nordost | 32 | 12 | 0 | 0 | 32 | 12 |
| Viktoria Berlin | 2017–18 | Regionalliga Nordost | 18 | 9 | 0 | 0 | 18 | 9 |
| Viktoria Berlin | Total | | 54 | 25 | 0 | 0 | 54 | 25 |
| Tennis Borussia Berlin | 2017–18 | NOFV-Oberliga Nord | 15 | 7 | 0 | 0 | 15 | 7 |
| Tennis Borussia Berlin | 2018–19 | NOFV-Oberliga Nord | 24 | 12 | 0 | 0 | 24 | 12 |
| Tennis Borussia Berlin | Total | | 39 | 19 | 0 | 0 | 39 | 19 |
| Career total | | | 374 | 135 | 6 | 2 | 380 | 137 |
