= Azongha Tembeng =

Cameroonian footballer

Personal information
- Full name: Azongha Tembeng Abenego
- Date of birth: 13 September 1991 (age 35)
- Place of birth: Douala, Cameroon
- Height: 1.88 m (6 ft 2 in)
- Position: Midfielder

Senior career*
Years	Team	Apps	(Gls)
2010–2011	Aigle Royal Menoua		
2011–2015	Les Astres		
2015–2017	MC El Eulma	10	(0)
2015–2016	→ DRB Tadjenanet (loan)	24	(1)
2016–2017	→ ES Sétif (loan)	20	(2)
2017–2019	Tondela	8	(0)
2019–2020	Estoril	22	(1)
2020–2021	Varzim	25	(0)
2021–2022	Sporting Covilhã	20	(0)
2022–2023	B-SAD	16	(0)
2023	Länk FCV	5	(0)
2023–2024	Atlético CP	16	(1)
2024–2025	Barreirense	7	(0)
Medal record
Representing Cameroon
All-Africa Games
Third place	2011 Maputo
- * Club domestic league appearances and goals as of 10 November 2024

Azongha Tembeng Abenego (born 13 September 1991) is a Cameroonian footballer.

== International career ==
In 2011, Tembeng was part of Cameroon's squad that won the bronze medal at the 2011 All-Africa Games.

== Honours ==
=== Club ===
ES Sétif

- Algerian Ligue Professionnelle 1 (1): 2016-17
