= Alaeddine Labiod =

Algerian footballer (born 1990)

Personal information
- Date of birth: 2 October 1990 (age 36)
- Place of birth: El Eulma, Algeria
- Position: Midfielder

Team information
- Current team: MC El Eulma
- Number: 3

Senior career*
Years	Team	Apps	(Gls)
2012–2013	USM Bel-Abbès	23	(0)
2013–	MC El Eulma	4	(0)
- * Club domestic league appearances and goals as of 11 December 2016

Alaeddine Labiod (born 2 October 1990) is an Algerian footballer who plays for MC El Eulma as a midfielder.
