= Mokhtar Belkhiter =

Algerian footballer (born 1992)

Personal information
- Date of birth: 15 January 1992 (age 34)
- Place of birth: Oran, Algeria
- Height: 1.85 m (6 ft 1 in)
- Position: Right-back

Team information
- Current team: MC Oran
- Number: 20

Youth career
- –2009: MC Oran

Senior career*
Years	Team	Apps	(Gls)
2009–2010	MC Oran	0	(0)
2010–2013	USM Blida	71	(2)
2013–2016	MC El Eulma	78	(1)
2016–2020	Club Africain	42	(3)
2019	→ Al-Qadsiah (loan)	13	(0)
2020–2024	CR Belouizdad	153	(3)
2024–2025	ASO Chlef	21	(0)
2025–	MC Oran	35	(1)

International career^{‡}
2011	Algeria U23	9	(0)
2017–2023	Algeria	8	(0)
- * Club domestic league appearances and goals as of 1st November 2026 ‡ National team caps and goals as of 1st November 2026

Mokhtar Belkhiter (Arabic: مختار بلخيثر; born 15 January 1992) is an Algerian professional footballer who plays as a right-back for Algerian Ligue Professionnelle 1 club MC Oran and the Algeria national team. He was part of the Algeria national team at the 2017 Africa Cup of Nations.

== Club career ==
Belklhiter was born in Oran.

On 30 April 2011, he was a starter in USM Blida's triumph in the 2011 Algerian Junior Cup Final against ES Sétif.

On 14 July 2011, he signed a five-year contract with USM Alger. However, as he was still under contract with USM Blida and the club rejected his transfer request, he was forced to remain at the club.

Belklhiter moved to CR Belouizdad in July 2020, having signed a three-year contract.

== International career ==
On 16 November 2011, Belkhiter was selected as part of Algeria's squad for the 2011 CAF U-23 Championship in Morocco.

== Career statistics ==
Club performance			League		Cup		Continental		Total	
Season	Club	League	Apps	Goals	Apps	Goals	Apps	Goals	Apps	Goals
Algeria			League		Algerian Cup		League Cup		Total	
2010–11	USM Blida	Ligue 1	24	0	2	0	0	0	26	0
2011–12	USM Blida	Ligue 2	23	0	1	0	0	0	24	0
2012–13	USM Blida	Ligue 2	27	2	5	0	0	0	32	2
Total	-		74	2	8	0	0	0	82	2
2013–14	MC El Eulma	Ligue 1	26	1	1	0	0	0	27	1
2014–15	MC El Eulma	Ligue 1	25	0	2	0	7	0	34	0
2015–16	MC El Eulma	Ligue 2	20	1	3	0	5	0	28	1
Total	-		71	2	6	0	12	0	89	2
2016–17	Club Africain	Ligue 1	21	1	4	1	9	1	34	3
2017–18	Club Africain	Ligue 1	8	0	-	-	3	0	11	0
2018–19	Club Africain	Ligue 1	11	0	-	-	1	0	12	0
2018–19	Al-Qadsiah	Pro League	13	0	-	-	-	-	13	0
2019–20	Club Africain	Ligue 1	6	0	-	-	-	-	6	0
Total	-		46	1	4	1	13	1	63	3
Career total			204	5	18	1	25	1	247	7

== Honours ==
USM Blida

- Algerian Junior Cup: 2010–11

Club Africain

- Tunisian Cup: 2016–17
