= 2013–14 in Algerian football =

Football in Algeria
- Season: 2013–14

Men's football
- Ligue 1: ES Sétif
- Ligue 2: USM Bel-Abbès
- Amateur: ESM Koléa; RC Relizane; DRB Tadjenanet
- Inter-Régions: SKAF Kemis Miliana; SCM Oran; CR Village Moussa; JS Djijel
- Algerian Cup: MC Alger

The 2013–14 season will be the 53rd season of competitive association football in Algeria.

== National teams ==
=== Algeria national football team ===
==== 2014 FIFA World Cup qualification ====
10 September 2013	Algeria	1 – 0	Mali	Stade Mustapha Tchaker, Blida
20:30 UTC+1	Soudani 50'	Report		Attendance: 23,500; Referee: Eric Otogo-Castane (Gabon)

12 October 2013	Burkina Faso	3 – 2	Algeria	Stade du 4-Août, Ouagadougou
16:00 UTC±0	Pitroipa 45+2'; D. Koné 65'; Bancé 86' (pen.)	Report	Feghouli 50'; Medjani 68'	Attendance: 31,000; Referee: Janny Sikazwe (Zambia)

19 November 2013	Algeria	1 – 0	Burkina Faso	Stade Mustapha Tchaker, Blida
19:15 UTC+1	Bougherra 49'	Report		Attendance: 35,000; Referee: Badara Diatta (Senegal)

==== International Friendlies ====
14 August 2013	Algeria	2 – 2	Guinea	Stade Mustapha Tchaker, Blida
20:30	Guedioura 11'; Djabou 24'	Report	56', 60' Cissé	Attendance: 10.000; Referee: Ali Lemghirfi (Tunisia)

5 March 2014	Algeria	2 – 0	Slovenia	Blida
18:00	45+2' Soudani; 55' Taïder	Report		Stadium: Stade Mustapha Tchaker; Attendance: 15.000; Referee: Néant Alioum (Cameroon)

31 May 2014 Friendly	Algeria	3–1	Armenia	Sion, Switzerland
17:00	13' Belkalem; 21' Ghilas; 41' Slimani	Report	Sarkisov 46'	Stadium: Stade Tourbillon; Attendance: 14.000; Referee: Sascha Amhof (Switzerland)

4 June 2014 Friendly	Algeria	2–1	Romania	Geneva, Switzerland
19:30	21' Bentaleb; 65' Soudani	Report	Chipciu 28'	Stadium: Stade de Genève; Attendance: 20.000; Referee: Nikolaj Hänni (Switzerland)

== League season ==
=== Ligue Professionnelle 1 ===
Pos	Team	Pld	W	D	L	GF	GA	GD	Pts	Qualification or relegation
1	USM Alger (C)	30	20	8	2	49	21	+28	68	Qualification for the Champions League preliminary round
2	JS Kabylie (Note: JS Kabylie, the 2013–14 Algerian Ligue Professionnelle 1 runner-up, was suspended by the CAF for two years due to the death of Albert Ebossé during their league home match against USM Alger. On 11 February 2015, the CAS overturned the suspension. However, their replacement MC El Eulma continued to represent Algeria in the 2015 CAF Champions League.)	30	15	9	6	39	21	+18	54	
3	ES Sétif	30	15	8	7	40	27	+13	53	Qualification for the Champions League first round
4	MC El Eulma	30	13	9	8	38	28	+10	48	Qualification for the Champions League preliminary round
5	USM El Harrach (Note: USM El Harrach would have qualified for the CAF Confederation Cup preliminary round by finishing fourth in the 2013–14 Algerian Ligue Professionnelle 1, but due to the penalty imposed on them by CAF after their withdrawal from the 2014 CAF Champions League, they could not participate.)	30	13	8	9	34	27	+7	47	
6	MC Alger	30	13	6	11	26	25	+1	45	Qualification for the Confederation Cup preliminary round
7	RC Arbaâ (Note: RC Arbaâ would have qualified for the CAF Confederation Cup preliminary round by finishing seventh in the 2013–14 Algerian Ligue Professionnelle 1, after the elimination of the USM El Harrach but were unable to participate because they were not adopted by the CAF as a professional team.)	30	12	8	10	33	32	+1	44	
8	ASO Chlef	30	11	10	9	29	19	+10	43	Qualification for the Confederation Cup preliminary round
9	JS Saoura	30	12	7	11	38	36	+2	43	
10	CS Constantine	30	10	11	9	30	31	−1	41	
11	MO Béjaïa	30	10	6	14	29	35	−6	36	
12	MC Oran	30	9	8	13	33	40	−7	35	
13	CR Belouizdad	30	9	5	16	26	33	−7	32	
14	JSM Béjaïa (R)	30	7	7	16	24	44	−20	28	Relegation to Ligue Professionnelle 2
15	CA Bordj Bou Arréridj (R)	30	4	9	17	23	47	−24	21	Relegation to Ligue Professionnelle 2
16	CRB Aïn Fakroun (R)	30	5	5	20	16	39	−23	20	Relegation to Ligue Professionnelle 2

Updated to match(es) played on 22 May 2014. Source: DZFoot
Rules for classification: 1) points; 2) head-to-head points; 3) head-to-head goal difference; 4) goal difference; 5) total goals; 6) fairplay ranking; 7) playoff.
(C) Champions; (R) Relegated

=== Ligue Professionnelle 2 ===
Pos	Team	Pld	W	D	L	GF	GA	GD	Pts	Promotion or relegation
1	USM Bel Abbès (P)	30	15	10	5	40	21	+19	55	2013–14 Algerian Ligue Professionnelle 1
2	NA Hussein Dey (P)	30	14	11	5	29	18	+11	53	2013–14 Algerian Ligue Professionnelle 1
3	ASM Oran (P)	30	13	13	4	30	18	+12	52	2013–14 Algerian Ligue Professionnelle 1
4	US Chaouia	30	15	6	9	32	26	+6	51	
5	Olympique de Médéa	29	14	8	7	34	22	+12	50	
6	USM Blida	30	13	8	9	34	25	+9	47	
7	WA Tlemcen	30	12	8	10	28	21	+7	44	
8	A Bou Saâda	30	10	9	11	31	32	−1	39	
9	AS Khroub	30	10	7	13	42	35	+7	37	
10	MC Saïda	30	9	10	11	27	30	−3	37	
11	CA Batna	30	9	10	11	23	29	−6	37	
12	USMM Hadjout	30	11	6	13	26	31	−5	39	
13	AB Merouana	30	9	8	13	23	29	−6	35	
14	MSP Batna (R)	30	7	12	11	15	23	−8	33	2013–14 Championnat National Amateur
15	USM Annaba (R)	30	6	11	13	17	31	−14	29	2013–14 Championnat National Amateur
16	ES Mostaganem (R)	30	2	3	25	16	53	−37	9	2013–14 Championnat National Amateur

Source: DZFOOT.COM
Rules for classification: 1) points; 2) goal difference; 3) number of goals scored.
(P) Promoted; (R) Relegated

== Deaths ==
- 12 June 2014: Nabil Hemani, 34, OMR El Annasser, JS Kabylie, ES Sétif and CS Constantine forward.
