= Jules Accorsi =

French footballer and manager (born 1937)

Personal information
- Date of birth: 27 June 1937 (age 89)
- Place of birth: Ajaccio, France
- Height: 1.76 m (5 ft 9 1/2 in)
- Position: Midfielder

Team information
- Current team: MC El Eulma (Head coach)

Senior career*
Years	Team	Apps	(Gls)
- AC Ajaccio
- Stade de Reims
- Grenoble
- SEC Bastia

Managerial career
- 1970–1974: SEC Bastia (assistant)
- 1974–1975: AC Ajaccio
- 1975–1979: SEC Bastia (assistant)
- 1986–1989: US Corte
- 1989–1991: Difaâ El Jadidi
- 1991–1992: Renaissance de Settat
- 1992–1995: ÉF Bastia
- 1995–1996: Difaâ El Jadidi
- 1996–1997: OCK Sfax
- 1997–1998: FC Calvi
- 1998–2000: CATP Ho Chi Minh
- 2000–2002: GFCO Ajaccio
- 2002–2003: Al-Oruba SC
- 2003–2005: SM Bejaïa
- 2005–2007: USCAF
- 2007–2008: Hà Nội ACB
- 2009–2010: USS Kraké
- 2010–2012: Central African Republic
- 2014: MC El Eulma
- 2015: MC El Eulma
- 2015–2017: MC El Eulma (sporting director)
- 2018–: MC El Eulma
- * Club domestic league appearances and goals

Jules Accorsi (born 27 June 1937) is a French professional football player and manager. He is currently in charge of MC El Eulma.

== Career ==
Born in Ajaccio, he began his career with AC Ajaccio. Also he played to the Stade de Reims, Grenoble and SEC Bastia.

In 1970, he started his coaching career in the SEC Bastia as an assistant. Since 1974 he coached French clubs AC Ajaccio, US Corte, ÉF Bastia, FC Calvi and GFCO Ajaccio. Also he worked with foreign clubs in Morocco, Tunisia, Vietnam, Oman, Algeria, Madagascar and Benin. Since July 2010 until May 2012 he was a head coach of the Central African Republic national football team. Since February until June 2014 he coached the MC El Eulma.
