= Ibrahim Chenihi =

Algerian footballer (born 1990)

Personal information
- Full name: Ibrahim Chenihi
- Date of birth: January 24, 1990 (age 36)
- Place of birth: M'Sila, Algeria
- Position: Winger

Senior career*
Years	Team	Apps	(Gls)
2010–2011	WR M'Sila	-	(-)
2011–2015	MC El Eulma	93	(19)
2015–2018	Club Africain	52	(18)
2018–2019	Al-Fateh	38	(5)
2020–2021	Damac	26	(4)
2021–2022	USM Alger	19	(0)
2022–2023	Al-Ain	31	(5)

International career^{‡}
2015–	Algeria	3	(0)
- * Club domestic league appearances and goals as of 8 June 2022 ‡ National team caps and goals as of 13 June 2015

Ibrahim Chenihi (born January 24, 1990) is an Algerian footballer. He plays mainly as a winger, and can play on both wings.

== Career ==
In 2015, Chenihi signed a contract with Club Africain. In 2018, Chenihi signed a contract with Al-Fateh. In 2020, Chenihi signed a contract with Damac. In 2021, he signed a two-year contract with USM Alger. On 31 August 2022, Chenihi joined Al-Ain.

== International career ==
Chenihi made his debut for the Algeria national team on March 26, 2015, coming on as a second-half substitute in a friendly match against Qatar. Four days later, he made his first start for Algeria in a 4–1 win over Oman.

== Honours ==
Club Africain

- Tunisian Cup (1): 2016–17
