= Younès Kadri =

Algerian footballer (born 1991)

Personal information
- Full name: Younès Kadri
- Date of birth: January 4, 1991 (age 35)
- Place of birth: Algeria
- Position: Forward

Team information
- Current team: MC El Eulma

Senior career*
Years	Team	Apps	(Gls)
2008–2010	ES Sétif	4	(1)
2010–2016	MC El Eulma	93	(6)
2016	USM Annaba	1	(0)

International career^{‡}
2010	Algeria U20	2	(1)
2010–	Algeria U23	0	(0)
- * Club domestic league appearances and goals as of 00:00, May 17, 2012 (UTC) ‡ National team caps and goals as of 10:00, 23 February 2011 (UTC)

Younès Kadri (born January 4, 1991) is an Algerian football player who played as a defensive midfielder and a forward for MC El Eulma in the Algerian Ligue Professionnelle 1.

== Career ==
He made his debut in the Algerian Ligue Professionnelle 1 for ES Sétif, a match in which he also scored. Later that year, he transferred to MC El Eulma, also in Ligue 1, where he remained for 6 seasons. With MC El Eulma, he participated in the Algerian Cup and CAF Champions League. He then transferred to USM Annaba where he played one match before retiring.

== Honours ==
ES Sétif

- Algerian Junior Cup: 2010
