= Walid Derrardja =

Algerian footballer (born 1990)

Personal information
- Full name: Walid Derrardja
- Date of birth: 18 September 1990 (age 36)
- Place of birth: Boudouaou, Algeria
- Height: 1.82 m (6 ft 0 in)
- Position: Midfielder

Team information
- Current team: MC Oran
- Number: 17

Youth career
- NA Hussein Dey

Senior career*
Years	Team	Apps	(Gls)
2008–2012	NA Hussein Dey	55	(10)
2012–2015	MC El Eulma	75	(29)
2015–2020	MC Alger	106	(20)
2015–2020	MC Oran	0	(0)

International career^{‡}
2010–2011	Algeria U23	4	(0)
- * Club domestic league appearances and goals as of 21:40, 27 September 2020 (EST) ‡ National team caps and goals as of 22:39, 28 July 2018 (EST)

Walid Derrardja (Arabic: وليد درارجة; born 18 September 1990 in Boudouaou) is an Algerian football player who is currently playing as a midfielder for MC Oran in the Algerian Ligue Professionnelle 1 and capped for Algeria at the under-23 level.

== Honours ==
- Algerian Ligue Professionnelle 1 top scorer: 2014–15
