= Tarek Zeghidi =

Algerian footballer (born 1985)

Personal information
- Date of birth: 12 November 1985 (age 41)
- Position: Defender

Team information
- Current team: MC El Eulma
- Number: 21

Senior career*
Years	Team	Apps	(Gls)
2009–2010	MSP Batna	24	(2)
2012–	MC El Eulma	69	(4)
- * Club domestic league appearances and goals as of 11 December 2016

Tarek Zeghidi (born 12 November 1985) is an Algerian footballer who plays for MC El Eulma as a defender.
