= Farès Hamiti =

Algerian footballer (born 1987)

Personal information
- Date of birth: June 26, 1987 (age 39)
- Place of birth: Blida, Algeria
- Height: 1.80 m (5 ft 11 in)
- Position: Forward

Team information
- Current team: JLCDOUERA
- Number: 29

Youth career
- USM Blida

Senior career*
Years	Team	Apps	(Gls)
2005–2009	USM Blida	54	(12)
2009–2011	JS Kabylie	50	(12)
2011–2012	USM Alger	15	(1)
2012–2013	CR Belouizdad	7	(1)
2013–2015	MC El Eulma	66	(21)
2016	MC Oujda	0	(0)
2016	JSM Béjaïa	0	(0)
2017	USM Blida	0	(0)
2026	JLCDOUERA	1	(4)
- * Club domestic league appearances and goals as of 21 janvier 2026

Farès Hamiti (born June 26, 1987) is an Algerian professional footballer who plays as a forward for JLCDOUERA in the Algerian Ligue AMATEUR.

== Club career ==
Hamiti was born in Blida. On June 27, 2012, he signed a two-year contract with CR Belouizdad, joining them on a free transfer from USM Alger.

== Honours ==
JS Kabylie

- Algerian Cup: 2011

Individual

- Algerian Cup top scorer: 2010–11 with 6 goals
