= Messaoud Zeghar Stadium =

Sports stadium in Algeria

Coordinates: 36°08′39″N 5°43′21″E

- Interactive map of Messaoud Zeghar Stadium
- Full name: Messaoud Zeghar Stadium
- Location: El Eulma, Algeria
- Operator: APC El Eulma
- Capacity: 25,000
- Surface: Grass

Construction
- Opened: 1994

Tenant
- MC El Eulma

Messaoud Zeghar Stadium (Arabic: ملعب مسعود زغار), is a multi-use stadium in El Eulma, Algeria. It is currently used mostly for football matches and is the home ground of MC El Eulma. The stadium holds 25,000 spectators.
