= El Eulma =

El Eulma العلمة
- City and Common
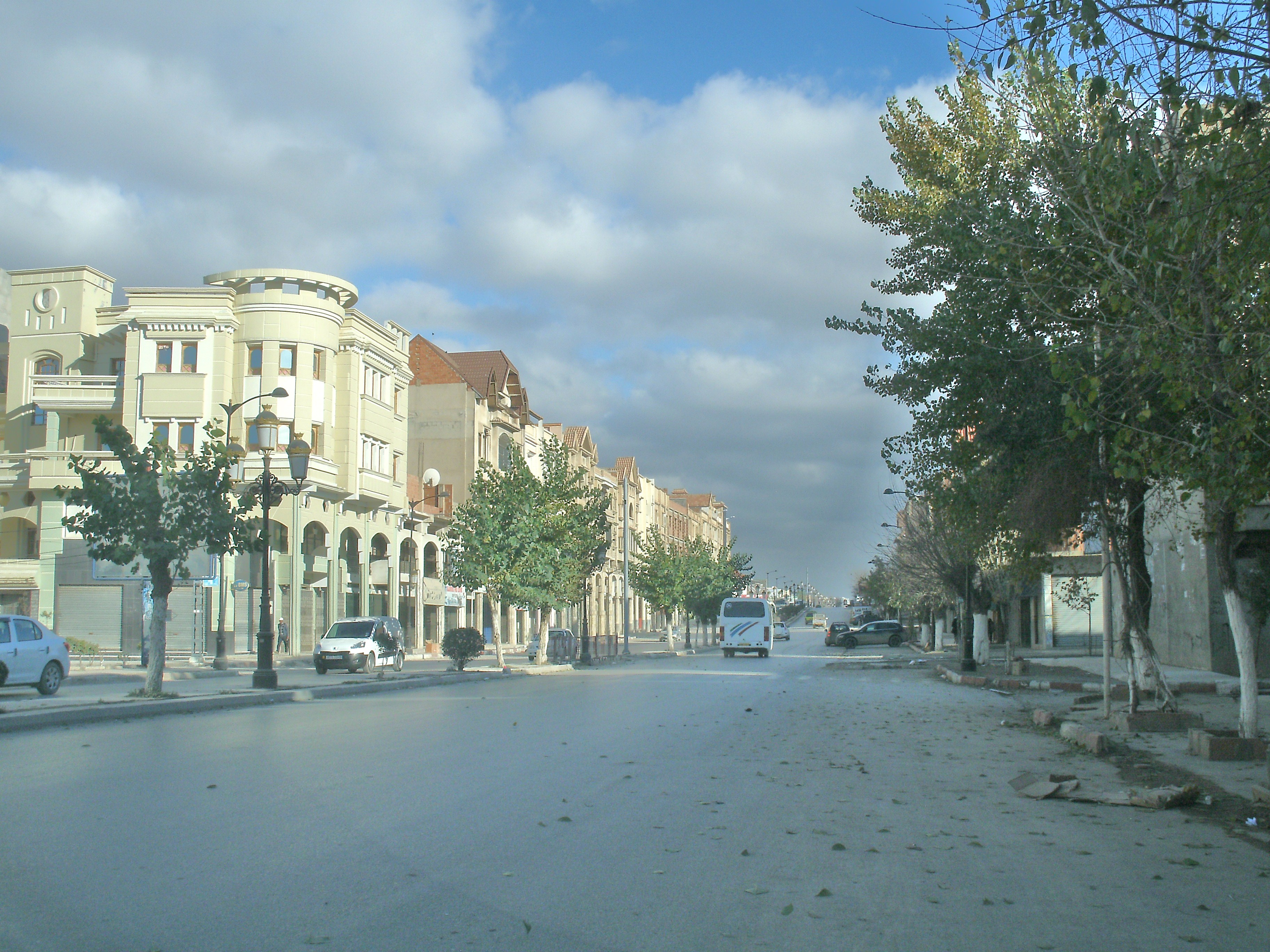
- El-Eulma
- Motto: "From the people, for the people"
- Location of El Eulma in the Setif Province

- Location of El Eulma in the Algeria
- Coordinates: 36.156449°N 5.685081°E
- Country: Algeria
- Province: Sétif Province
- APC: 2012-2017

Government
  - Type: Municipality
  - Mayor: Salim Lakehal (NLF)

Area
  - Total: 28.65 sq mi (74.20 km^{2})

Population (2008)
  - Total: 355,038
- Time zone: UTC+1 (CET)
- Postal code: 19001
- ISO 3166 code: CP

El Eulma (Arabic: العلمة) is a city in Algeria, located 210 miles east of the capital, Algiers. It is the second-largest city in Sétif Province, with a population of 305,130 (1998 census). In the French colonial period, the city was known as Saint Arnaud, after Marshal Jacques Leroy de Saint Arnaud.
