= MC El Eulma =

Algerian football club

- Full name: Mouloudia Chabab El Eulma
- Nickname: Babia
- Founded: 1936
- Ground: Messaoud Zeghar Stadium
- Capacity: 5,000
- League: Interregional League
- 2025–26: Interregional League, Group Centre-east, 4th of 16
Home colours	Away colours

Mouloudia Chabab El Eulma (Arabic: مولودية شباب العلمة), (Berber languages: ⵉⵣⵎⴰⵡⴻⵏ ⵏ ⵍⵄⴰⵍⵎⴰ) known as MC El Eulma or simply MCEE for short, is an Algerian football club based in El Eulma. The club was founded in 1936 and its colors are green and red. Their home stadium, Messaoud Zeghar Stadium, has a capacity of some 25,000 spectators. The club is currently playing in the Interregional League.

== History ==
=== Colonial and founding of the MCSA ===
A group of Muslims decided to create a Muslim club in the city and to impose the Algerian nationalist colors as the club color. The pre-meeting was held on the side of Boulenouar bakery, and participating members are Bahlouli Brahim, Belkacem Bouanan, Belfadhel Mohamed Ettaher Youcef El Okbi Bashir and Mohamed Jafar, most of which were playing DSA. Bahlouli Brahim was the first president of the club.

From 1942, a second formation called the 'Olympic Muslim Saint-Arnaud' ( 'WOAH' ) was formally established by activists (i.e. FADLI.S, GUESSAB.K, HABBICHE.H, LAKHAL.H, MEKIDECHE A, Bahlouli Bahi SALEM.B, DJILANI.A, MAOUCHE.M, LAIFA.A and BELFADEL.B) under cover of nationalism, they have combined their efforts militantistes to give it a so-called union of Muslims and colors of the future national emblem (green and red).

In 1948, a third team, 'Widad de Saint-Arnaud' ( 'WSA' ) was born, thanks to dissatisfied opposition leaders and players of the election of OMSA the committee chaired by Mr Saadi Zaaboub and this after a stormy meeting.

In early 1950, the slogan of the union, launched by the Algerian nationalists, both clubs the 'WOAH' and 'WSA' made merger to form a single team, 'MCSA' , in order to safeguard the interest and nationalistic colonial annoy the other team the 'DSA' . The 'Mouloudia Club of St. Arnaud' ( 'MCSA' ), resulting from the merger, became the heir of its predecessors (OMSA and Widad) due to a compromise embodied by a committee of wise HABBICHE El-Hadj Amor SALEM Belgacem and LAKHAL.

The operation allowed the unification 'Mouloudia' , the preservation of approval that would give him the right to play in 1st Division, maintain the committee from both political tendencies and give nationalist politics replica of a sports-related association. This was the fulfillment of this generation with MEKIDECHE.L, LOUCIF.L, Bouanane Ali HABBICHE.L, Guessab Tahar, BOUDJRI.T, KARS.A, GUEDJ.R, HARCHE.A and GUENOUD.A under the driving coach ANANI Abdeslem.

A fifth club has emerged, alongside the 'MCSA' . This is the 'Union of St. Arnaud' ( 'USA' ) in lieu of the 'DSA' to Following the change of its acronym. The instigators are Yachir, DIGUECHE.S, Zaaboub Said, BOUANANE.B and citizens of the town and, to offset the challenge of their antagonists.

After a short journey to a lower division, the 'USA' joined the 1st Division, thanks to a host of players including Bouanane brothers LOGBI.B, HADJ -SAHRAOUI Messaoud, SABRI.S, BELLOUEL L-MEZIANE CHERIF.R, BOUGUERCHE.M, ROUAI.A, BOULAOUA.A, GABI Sarraf and Mazia brothers.

In 1954, martial law was decreed by the colonial administration in the wake of the popular uprising (insurgency), sports and cultural associations have been forced to suspend all their manifestations. Therefore, most players and managers Mouloudia ( 'MCSA' ) emigrated after repeated questioning of the police and reprisals settlers because of their adherence to the nationalist political parties .

During 1959, a youth group, led fire KACIMI Abdallah, has created the 'Etoile Filante de Saint-Arnaud' ('EFSA') without it is officially engaged. It only organizing friendly meetings with military teams of the colonial army, stationed in St. Arnaud.

In 1960, another club has taken over from the ' EFSA'; it is the 'Rapid Club of St. Arnaud' ('RCSA'), established after a prior agreement of the organization of the FLN, obtained by the founders in the occurrence RAGUEB Messaoud, Hadj-Sahraoui Messaoud, CHENANE D., GUENOUD H., ATALLAH Rabah and Laifa Tayeb.

The 'RCSA', training fielding quality players in its ranks in the image of BELHADJ L., RAHMOUNE L., KHARCHI A., HAMDI S., MEKIDECHE L. (player- coach), KACIMI Kamal, KACIMI Djamal, TABBICHE S., HABBICHE M., HABBICHE A., HADDEF A. and was officially engaged in the County Championship group (Wilaya) rivaling the Entente Setif of Koussim, MATTEM, LAYASSE, Kemicha and FERCHICHI.

MC El Eulma were relegated despite being the top scorers in the country's Ligue Professionnelle 1.

== Honours ==
- Algerian Championnat National 2
  - Champions (1): 2008

== Managers ==
- (Algeria) Rachid Belhout (2008–09)
- (France) Jacques Castellan (July 1, 2009 – Feb 20, 2010)
- (France) Hakim Malek (July 1, 2010 – Dec 14, 2010)
- (Algeria) Madjid Taleb (July 1, 2011 – June 30, 2012)
- (Algeria) Lamine Boughrara (April 17, 2012 – June 30, 2012)
- (Algeria) Abdelkader Yaïche (June 28, 2012 – Nov 6, 2012)
- (Algeria) Rachid Belhout (Oct 3, 2012 – Feb 24, 2013)
- (Switzerland) Raoul Savoy (Feb 26, 2013 – June 30, 2013)
- (Algeria) Abdelkader Yaïche (July 1, 2013 – Dec 11, 2013)
- (Cameroon) Hans Agbo (interim) (Dec 12, 2013 – Dec 31, 2013)
- (France) Jules Accorsi (Jan 1, 2014–)

== Rival clubs ==
- (Algeria) ES Setif (Derby)
- (Algeria) CA Bordj Bou Arreridj (Rivalry)
- (Algeria) MO Béjaïa (Rivalry)
